= 1960–61 Honduran Amateur League =

Honduran Amateur League
- Season: 1960–61
- Champions: Olimpia
- All statistics correct as of 6 March 1961.

The 1960–61 Honduran Amateur League was the 13th edition of the Honduran Amateur League. The season ran from 14 February 1960 to 6 March 1961, however, it was declared null and abandoned due to an excessive delay to start the final phase of the season.

== Regional champions ==
Regional championship	Champions
Atlántida	Vida
Cortés	España
Francisco Morazán	Olimpia
South zone	Tigre
Yoro	Honduras

=== Known results ===
1960	Olimpia	1–1	Motagua	Tegucigalpa
CST				Stadium: Estadio Tiburcio Carías Andino

1960	Olimpia	2–1	Motagua	Tegucigalpa
CST	Rodríguez; García			Stadium: Estadio Tiburcio Carías Andino

1960	Olimpia	7–1	Troya	Tegucigalpa
CST				Stadium: Estadio Tiburcio Carías Andino

1960	Olimpia	1–0	Troya	Tegucigalpa
CST				Stadium: Estadio Tiburcio Carías Andino

1960	Olimpia	4–1	Federal	Tegucigalpa
CST				Stadium: Estadio Tiburcio Carías Andino

1960	Olimpia	3–3	Federal	Tegucigalpa
CST				Stadium: Estadio Tiburcio Carías Andino

1960	Olimpia	2–1	Argentina	Tegucigalpa
CST				Stadium: Estadio Tiburcio Carías Andino

1960	Olimpia	2–0	Argentina	Tegucigalpa
CST				Stadium: Estadio Tiburcio Carías Andino

1960	Olimpia	2–0	Gimnástico	Tegucigalpa
CST				Stadium: Estadio Tiburcio Carías Andino

1960	Olimpia	2–1	Gimnástico	Tegucigalpa
CST				Stadium: Estadio Tiburcio Carías Andino

== National championship round ==
Scheduled to be played in a double round-robin format between the regional champions. Also known as the Pentagonal. However, only one game was played due to the withdrawals of C.D. Honduras and C.D.S. Vida. It is unclear the reason why the Honduran Sports Federation decided on 6 March 1961 to proclaim C.D. Olimpia as 1960–61 national champions

Pos	Team	Pld	W	D	L	GF	GA	GD	Pts
1	Honduras	1	1	0	0	2	0	+2	2
2	Olimpia	0	0	0	0	0	0	0	0
3	Tigre	0	0	0	0	0	0	0	0
4	Vida	0	0	0	0	0	0	0	0
5	España	1	0	0	1	0	2	−2	0

=== Results ===
1961	Honduras	2–0	España	El Progreso
CST				Stadium: Estadio Humberto Micheletti

== Olimpia's lineup ==
- Ricardo Rodríguez
- Will Garcia
- Andrés Salinas
- Ronald Leaky
- Abraham Pavón
- Efraín Zavala
- Carlos Castillo
- Jorge Zavala
- Fernando Brenes
- Marco Rosales
- Alberto Solís
- Carlos Meza
- Ricardo Taylor
- Felipe Barahona
- René Rodríguez
- Efraín Salinas
- Alonso Lanza
- Fausto Yu Shan
- Reinaldo Centeno
- Federico Budde
