= List of F.C. Motagua records and statistics =

F.C. Motagua is a Honduran professional football club based in Tegucigalpa, Honduras. The club was founded in 1928. Motagua currently plays in the Honduran Liga Nacional, the top tier of Honduran football. They have not been out of the top tier since 1965, the year the league was inaugurated. They have also been involved in CONCACAF football since they qualified to the CONCACAF Champions' Cup in 1969.

This list encompasses the major honours won by Motagua and records set by the club, their managers and their players. The player records section includes details of the club's leading goalscorers and those who have made most appearances in first-team competitions. It also records notable achievements by Motagua players on the international stage.

All stats accurate as of match played 7 November 2026.

== Honours ==
Motagua is the second most successful club in Honduras, having won 20 domestic leagues since the inauguration of the Honduran Liga Nacional in 1965–66.

=== Domestic ===
- Honduran Liga Nacional
  - Winners (20): 1968–69, 1970–71, 1973–74, 1978–79, 1991–92, 1997–98 A, 1997–98 C, 1999–2000 A, 1999–2000 C, 2001–02 A, 2006–07 A, 2010–11 C, 2014–15 A, 2016–17 A, 2016–17 C, 2018–19 A, 2018–19 C, 2021–22 C, 2024–25 A, 2025–26 C
  - Runners-up (16): 1969–70, 1974–75, 1976–77, 1982–83, 1990–91, 1993–94, 2002–03 C, 2007–08 A, 2009–10 C, 2014–15 C, 2015–16 A, 2017–18 A, 2017–18 C, 2020–21 C, 2022–23 A, 2023–24 A
- Honduran Cup
  - Winners (1): 1968
  - Runners-up (4): 1993, 1995, 1997, 1998
- Honduran Supercup
  - Winners (2): 1999, 2017
- Amateur era
  - Honduran Amateur League: 1948, 1950–51
  - Francisco Morazán Major League: 1947, 1948, 1950, 1951, 1954

=== International ===
==== Continental ====
- CONCACAF League
  - Runners-up (3): 2018, 2019, 2021

==== Regional ====
- UNCAF Interclub Cup
  - Winners (1): 2007

=== Friendly ===
- Copa Corona del Rosal (1): 1968
- Copa Burra Rivas (1): 2014
- Copa Amistad Padre Alberto Gauci (1): 2015
- Copa Ciclón (1): 2015

== Club records ==
=== All-time results ===
Competition	GP	W	D	L	GF	GA	+/-
Domestic league (regular season)	1864	793	609	462	2546	1855	+691
Domestic league (post season)	303	110	107	86	372	324	+48
Domestic league (combined record)	2167	903	716	548	2918	2179	+739
Honduran Cup	48	22	16	10	75	52	+23
Honduran Supercup	3	2	0	1	3	2	+1
CONCACAF Champions Cup	60	13	15	32	51	97	–46
CONCACAF Central American Cup	32	12	12	8	48	36	+12
CONCACAF League	34	14	13	7	42	29	+13
CONCACAF Giants Cup	2	0	1	1	1	5	–4
UNCAF Interclub Cup	24	11	7	6	30	25	+5
CONMEBOL Copa Sudamericana	2	0	0	2	1	6	–5
Copa Fraternidad (non-official)	10	2	3	5	10	16	–6
Torneo Grandes de Centro América (non-official)	14	1	10	3	11	13	–2

=== Head to head ===
Opponent (domestic league)	GP	W	D	L	GF	GA	+/-
Atlántida	3	2	0	1	6	1	+5
Atlético Choloma	8	4	4	0	8	2	+6
Atlético Español	12	5	4	3	15	7	+8
Atlético Independiente	1	0	1	0	0	0	0
Atlético Indio	24	11	10	3	29	16	+13
Atlético Morazán / Juventud Morazánica	19	6	8	5	24	19	+5
Atlético Olanchano / Campamento	19	12	4	3	31	19	+12
Atlético Portuario	3	1	2	0	6	3	+3
Broncos	50	22	24	4	57	29	+28
Choloma	5	5	0	0	15	4	+11
Curacao	6	2	3	1	7	5	+2
Dandy	7	4	2	1	10	6	+4
Deportes Progreseño	6	4	2	0	11	4	+7
Deportes Savio	36	15	14	7	53	35	+18
E.A.C.I.	6	4	2	0	8	3	+5
Estrella Roja	2	1	0	1	2	3	–1
Federal	17	12	5	0	30	9	+21
Génesis	10	7	3	0	21	5	+16
Génesis PN	7	5	1	1	17	8	+9
Hispano	26	10	8	8	34	28	+6
Honduras / Honduras Progreso	49	31	10	8	103	47	+56
Honduras Salzburg	4	4	0	0	9	4	+5
Independiente / Independiente Villela	16	11	5	0	41	16	+25
Juticalpa	28	20	6	2	69	26	+43
La Salle / San Pedro	6	3	1	2	12	8	+4
Lempira	9	6	2	1	18	6	+12
Marathón	254	95	82	77	334	301	+33
Municipal Valencia	8	2	5	1	6	6	0
Necaxa	8	3	3	2	8	8	0
Olancho	21	7	8	6	23	23	0
Olimpia	292	64	115	113	243	334	–91
Palestino	4	3	1	0	10	5	+5
Parrillas One	8	3	3	2	12	12	0
Platense	214	94	64	56	288	205	+83
Real Comayagua	4	2	1	1	5	3	+2
Real de Minas	12	5	5	2	25	14	+11
Real España / España	266	94	83	89	301	295	+6
Real Juventud	8	5	3	0	15	4	+11
Real Maya / Real Patepluma	29	17	8	4	38	18	+20
Real Sociedad	49	22	16	11	94	62	+32
Social Sol	4	2	1	1	9	5	+4
Sula / Juventud de Sula	21	9	10	2	25	14	+11
Súper Estrella	12	6	3	3	23	11	+12
Tela Timsa / Petrotela	19	9	4	6	26	22	+4
Tiburones	3	1	2	0	5	2	+3
Troya	10	4	2	4	11	10	+1
Universidad / Broncos UNAH	95	43	29	23	116	78	+38
UPNFM	41	26	10	5	84	37	+47
Verdún	3	2	1	0	5	0	+5
Victoria	184	76	61	47	273	206	+67
Vida	219	102	75	42	305	194	+111
Opponent (Honduran Cup)	GP	W	D	L	GF	GA	+/-
Alianza Becerra	1	1	0	0	1	0	+1
Atlético Español	1	1	0	0	1	0	+1
Atlético Esperanzano	3	2	0	1	6	3	+3
Atlético Indio	4	1	1	2	3	4	–1
Atlético Olanchano	1	1	0	0	4	1	+3
Broncos	2	1	1	0	2	1	+1
Calvario	1	1	0	0	4	1	+3
Deportes Progreseño	2	1	1	0	1	0	+1
Gremio	1	0	1	0	1	1	0
Independiente de Cantarranas	1	1	0	0	1	0	+1
Juticalpa	2	0	2	0	1	1	0
Las Delicias	1	0	0	1	1	2	–1
Marathón	3	3	0	0	4	1	+3
Olimpia	4	1	2	1	6	8	–2
Petrotela	1	1	0	0	3	1	+2
Platense	2	0	1	1	2	3	–1
Real España / España	4	1	2	1	5	4	+1
Real Maya	5	0	3	2	6	9	–3
San Juan Bosco	1	1	0	0	2	1	+1
Súper Estrella	2	1	1	0	5	3	+2
Troya	1	1	0	0	2	0	+2
Universidad	1	0	1	0	0	0	0
Victoria	2	1	0	1	7	3	+4
Vida	1	1	0	0	3	2	+1
Villanueva	1	1	0	0	4	3	+1
Opponent (Honduran Supercup)	GP	W	D	L	GF	GA	+/-
Marathón	1	1	0	0	2	1	+1
Olimpia	1	0	0	1	0	1	–1
Platense	1	1	0	0	1	0	+1
Opponent (official international games)	GP	W	D	L	GF	GA	+/-
(El Salvador) Águila	2	1	1	0	4	2	+2
(Costa Rica) Alajuelense	11	1	2	8	9	25	–16
(El Salvador) Alianza	5	2	3	0	8	2	+6
(Mexico) América	2	0	1	1	1	5	–4
(Panama) Árabe Unido	1	0	0	1	1	2	–1
(Argentina) Arsenal	2	0	0	2	1	6	–5
(United States) Atlanta United	2	0	1	1	1	4	–3
(El Salvador) Atlético Marte	2	1	0	1	4	2	+2
(Belize) Belmopan Bandits	2	2	0	0	3	0	+3
(Costa Rica) Cartaginés	6	2	2	2	5	5	0
(Dominican Republic) Cibao	2	2	0	0	3	0	+3
(United States) Cincinnati	2	0	1	1	2	5	–3
(Guatemala) Comunicaciones	14	3	7	4	15	19	–4
(Nicaragua) Diriangén	1	0	0	1	1	2	–1
(El Salvador) FAS	1	1	0	0	1	0	+1
(Canada) Forge	2	0	2	0	2	2	0
(Costa Rica) Herediano	7	2	3	2	7	9	–2
(Panama) Independiente	3	1	1	1	3	4	–1
(Belize) Juventus	4	2	2	0	9	2	+7
(United States) LA Galaxy	4	0	1	3	2	6	–4
(El Salvador) Luis Ángel Firpo	2	1	0	1	2	2	0
(Nicaragua) Managua	2	1	1	0	3	2	+1
(Honduras) Marathón	3	3	0	0	6	1	+5
(Mexico) Morelia	2	0	0	2	0	6	–6
(Guatemala) Municipal	9	3	2	4	11	12	–1
(United States) NY Pancyprian-Freedoms	2	1	0	1	3	4	–1
(Honduras) Olancho	1	1	0	0	1	0	+1
(Honduras) Olimpia	3	0	1	2	0	3	–3
(Mexico) Pachuca	4	0	3	1	1	2	–1
(Bermuda) Pembroke Hamilton	2	1	0	1	3	5	–2
(Jamaica) Portmore United	2	2	0	0	5	2	+3
(Nicaragua) Real Estelí	3	2	1	0	7	3	+4
(Panama) San Francisco	3	3	0	0	5	2	+3
(Costa Rica) Saprissa	16	1	6	9	7	27	–20
(United States) Seattle Sounders	2	0	1	1	0	5	–5
(Panama) Sporting San Miguelito	1	1	0	0	2	0	+2
(Panama) Tauro	7	3	2	2	9	5	+4
(Mexico) Tijuana	2	0	1	1	1	2	–1
(Canada) Toronto	2	0	1	1	2	3	–1
(Mexico) UANL	2	0	0	2	0	6	–6
(Panama) Universitario	2	1	1	0	3	2	+1
(Belize) Verdes	3	3	0	0	14	1	+13
(Nicaragua) Walter Ferretti	2	2	0	0	4	1	+3
(Jamaica) Waterhouse	2	1	1	0	2	0	+2

=== Streaks ===
Longest league unbeaten run (33)	1 Mar 1973 – 21 Apr 1974	W	D	W	D	D	D	D	W	D	W	D	W	D	W	W	W	W	D	D	D	D	D	W	W	D	W	W	D	D	W	W	D	D
Longest Honduran Cup unbeaten run (8)	10 Nov 1968 – 28 Nov 1972	W	D	W	D	D	W	W	D																									
Longest Honduran Cup unbeaten run (8)	29 Apr 2015 – 21 Jan 2017	D	W	W	W	W	D	D	D																									
Longest Honduran Supercup unbeaten run (2)	13 Jan 1999 – 2 Aug 2017	W	W																															
Longest international unbeaten run (9)	7 Aug 2007 – 11 Mar 2008	W	W	W	W	W	W	D	W	D																								
Longest league winless run (15)	25 May 1980 – 31 Aug 1980	D	L	D	D	L	D	D	D	D	D	D	L	D	D	L																		
Longest Honduran Cup winless run (4)	17 Feb 2016 – 22 Jul 2018	D	D	D	L																													
Longest international winless run (10)	3 Mar 1999 – 19 Aug 2001	D	D	D	L	L	L	D	D	L	L																							

=== Match records ===
Largest league victory	24 November 1991	7–0 v Súper Estrella
Largest Honduran Cup victory	10 November 1968	5–0 v Victoria
Largest Honduran Supercup victory	2 August 2017	2–1 v Marathón
Largest international victory	30 June 1993	5–0 v Juventus (BLZ)
Largest international victory	2 August 2023	5–0 v Verdes (BLZ)
Largest international victory	28 July 2026	5–0 v Verdes (BLZ)
Largest league defeat	23 October 1985	0–5 v Vida
Largest league defeat	6 April 2013	0–5 v Marathón
Largest league defeat	24 August 2014	0–5 v Real España
Largest Honduran Cup defeat	30 July 1992	0–5 v Olimpia
Largest international defeat	24 February 2022	0–5 v Seattle Sounders (USA)
Largest international defeat	13 April 2023	0–5 v UANL (MEX)
Most goals scored in a single game	30 September 1999	8–2 v Vida
Most goals received in a single game	26 April 1987	2–6 v Vida
Most goals received in a single game	19 April 2009	3–6 v Marathón

== Players ==
=== 200+ appearances ===
Domestic league only

Player	Years	App.
(Honduras) Júnior Izaguirre	1997–2005, 2011–2016	404
(Honduras) Noel Valladares	1997–2005	368
(Honduras) Omar Elvir	2010–2022	334
(Honduras) Ángel Obando	1972–1986	300
(Honduras) Milton Reyes	1997–2002, 2005–2011	291
(Honduras) Ramón Maradiaga	1975–1982, 1989–1990	287
(Honduras) Raúl Santos	2017–2026	280
(Honduras) Walter Martínez	2017–2025	267
(Honduras) Héctor Castellanos	2015–2023, 2024–2025	261
(Honduras) Rubén Guifarro	1967–1984	260
(Honduras) Amado Guevara	1994–2000, 2007–2008, 2010–2013	258
(Honduras) Juan Montes	2013–2021	258
(Argentina) Jonathan Rougier	2017–2025	248
(Honduras) Ninrrol Medina	1993–2000, 2001–2002	243
(Honduras) Wilmer Crisanto	2014–2021	233
(Honduras) Iván Guerrero	1996–2010, 2002–2004, 2009–2011	224
(Honduras) Carlos Discua	2011–2015, 2016–2018	221
(Honduras) Marcelo Pereira	2014–2024	218
(Honduras) Reinieri Mayorquín	2014–2021	215
(Honduras) Hernaín Arzú	1988–1998	212
(Honduras) Luís Reyes	1976–1985	211
(Honduras) Cristopher Meléndez	2016–	208
(Honduras) Rubilio Castillo	2014–2018, 2020–2021, 2024	205
(Honduras) Kevin López	2014–2022	203

=== Top 10 scorers ===
All official competitions

Player	Years	League	Cup	Int.	Total goals
(Honduras) Rubilio Castillo	2014–2018, 2020–2021, 2024	113	2	7	122
(Honduras) Ángel Obando	1972–1986	77	0	4	81
(Honduras) Amado Guevara	1994–2000, 2007–2008, 2010–2013	70	1	8	79
(Paraguay) Roberto Moreira	2018–2023	69	0	8	77
(Honduras) Óscar Hernández	1968–1976	59	0	1	60
(Honduras) Kevin López	2014–2022	47	1	8	56
(Honduras) Luís Reyes	1976–1985	54	0	1	55
(Argentina) Agustín Auzmendi	2023–2025	42	0	11	53
(Honduras) Jairo Martínez	1997–2000, 2002–2005, 2006–2008	52	0	1	53
(Honduras) Carlos Discua	2011–2015, 2016–2018	52	0	0	52

=== List of hat-tricks ===
Both Jairo Martínez and Agustín Auzmendi hold the record of most hat-tricks for the club, with a total of four. Denilson Costa is the only player to score four goals in a single game for F.C. Motagua, which he did on 6 April 1997 against Independiente Villela.

Player (count)	Date	Opponent
(Honduras) Elio Banegas (1)	7 August 1966	Platense
(Brazil) Roberto Abrussezze (1)	18 August 1968	Victoria
(Brazil) Geraldo Baptista (1)	14 December 1969	Victoria
(Brazil) Pedro da Silva (1)	6 September 1970	Atlético Español
(Honduras) Óscar Hernández (1)	20 August 1972	Marathón
(Honduras) Mario Blandón (1)	21 January 1973	Broncos
(Honduras) Luís Reyes (1)	28 January 1979	Real España
(Chile) Mario Iubini (1)	1 June 1983	Platense
(Honduras) Leonel Suazo (1)	2 November 1983	Juventud Morazánica
(Honduras) Álex Ávila (1)	24 November 1991	Súper Estrella
(Honduras) César Obando (1)	24 November 1991	Súper Estrella
(Uruguay) Álvaro Izquierdo (1)	27 October 1992	Vida
(Honduras) Presley Carson (1)	21 October 1993	Petrotela
(Honduras) Geovanny Castro (1)	8 December 1995	Vida
(Brazil) Denilson Costa (1) (scored 4 goals)	6 April 1997	Independiente Villela
(Honduras) Jairo Martínez (1)	6 September 1998	Independiente Villela
(Honduras) Amado Guevara (1)	4 October 1998	Platense
(Honduras) Jairo Martínez (2)	11 April 1999	Vida
(Honduras) Reynaldo Clavasquín (1)	10 October 1999	Federal
(Honduras) Jairo Martínez (3)	20 March 2004	Universidad
(Honduras) Jairo Martínez (4)	13 September 2006	Broncos UNAH
(Honduras) Carlos Discua (1)	10 August 2014	Honduras Progreso
(Argentina) Lucas Gómez (1)	5 October 2014	Real Sociedad
(Honduras) Eddie Hernández (1)	14 November 2015	Real España
(Honduras) Rubilio Castillo (1)	14 August 2016	Marathón
(Paraguay) Roberto Moreira (1)	24 February 2019	Juticalpa
(Paraguay) Roberto Moreira (2)	5 May 2019	Platense
(Paraguay) Roberto Moreira (3)	9 February 2020	Honduras Progreso
(Argentina) Gonzalo Klusener (1)	27 April 2021	Platense
(Honduras) Kevin López (1)	3 October 2021	Victoria
(Argentina) Agustín Auzmendi (1)	2 August 2023	Verdes
(Argentina) Agustín Auzmendi (2)	20 September 2023	Victoria
(Argentina) Agustín Auzmendi (3)	25 April 2024	Real Sociedad
(Argentina) Agustín Auzmendi (4)	26 July 2024	UPNFM
(Argentina) Rodrigo Auzmendi (1)	6 February 2025	UPNFM
(Argentina) Rodrigo Auzmendi (2)	7 May 2025	Génesis
(Uruguay) Rodrigo De Olivera (1)	11 February 2026	Génesis PN

=== League awards ===
Season	Top goalscorers	GS
1968–69	(Brazil) Roberto Abrussezze	16
1973–74	(Honduras) Mario Blandón (shared)	16
1977–78	(Chile) Mario Carreño	10
1978–79	(Honduras) Salvador Bernárdez	15
1988–89	(Honduras) Miguel Matthews (shared)	8
1994–95	(Honduras) Álex Ávila	14
1995–96	(Honduras) Geovanny Castro	14
1996–97	(Brazil) Denilson Costa	13
1997–98 C	(Honduras) Amado Guevara (shared)	15
2010–11 C	(Honduras) Jerry Bengtson	15
2014–15	(Honduras) Rubilio Castillo	29
2023–24 A	(Argentina) Agustín Auzmendi	16
2024–25 A	(Argentina) Agustín Auzmendi	13
2024–25 C	(Argentina) Rodrigo Auzmendi	12

Season	Best goalkeeper
1970–71	(Nicaragua) Salvador Dubois
1973–74	(Nicaragua) Roger Mayorga
1974–75	(Nicaragua) Roger Mayorga
1978–79	(Honduras) Alcides Morales
1981–82	(Honduras) Alcides Morales
1991–92	(Honduras) Marvin Henríquez
1997–98 A	(Argentina) Diego Vásquez
1997–98 C	(Argentina) Diego Vásquez
2006–07 A	(Honduras) Ricardo Canales
2008–09 A	(Honduras) Ricardo Canales
2012–13	(Honduras) Donaldo Morales
2014–15	(Argentina) Sebastián Portigliatti
2017–18	(Argentina) Jonathan Rougier
2018–19	(Argentina) Jonathan Rougier
2019–20	(Argentina) Jonathan Rougier
2021–22	(Honduras) Marlon Licona

=== Others ===
- Most goals scored in one season:

(Honduras) Rubilio Castillo – 29 in 2014–15

- Goalkeeper with longest clean-sheet:

(Nicaragua) Roger Mayorga – 838 minutes in 10 games in 1976

- First league scorer:

(Honduras) Amado Castillo, 18 July 1965

- First Honduran Cup scorer:

(Honduras) Elio Banegas, 6 October 1968

- First Honduran Supercup scorer:

(Honduras) Juan Coello, 13 January 1999

- First international competition scorer:

(Honduras) Rubén Guifarro, 1 May 1969

== Managerial records ==
- First ever coach:

(Honduras) Daniel Bustillo – 1928

- Most successful coaches:

(Argentina) Diego Vásquez – 6 leagues and 1 Honduran Supercup
(Honduras) Ramón Maradiaga – 4 leagues, 1 Honduran Supercup and 1 UNCAF Interclub Cup

- Most consecutive games as coach:

(Argentina) Diego Vásquez – 350 games (2014–2022)

=== League records ===
Coach	Appointment	Vacancy	Cchd	W	D	L	GF	GA	GD	Pts	Per
(Honduras) Ramón Maradiaga	1 November 2005	26 March 2008	99	45	21	33	140	115	+25	156	56.06%
(Honduras) Jorge Pineda	26 March 2008	21 April 2008	5	1	1	3	6	9	–3	4	30.00%
(Honduras) Reynaldo Clavasquín	21 April 2008	6 June 2008	4	2	0	2	7	8	–1	6	50.00%
(Colombia) Jaime de la Pava	6 June 2008	25 March 2009	32	13	8	11	34	33	+1	47	53.13%
(Mexico) Juan Castillo	25 March 2009	26 November 2009	25	12	6	7	36	26	+10	42	60.00%
(Honduras) Ramón Maradiaga	26 November 2009	16 September 2011	45	16	15	14	58	54	+4	63	52.22%
(Honduras) Luis Reyes	16 September 2011	19 September 2011	1	0	0	1	1	2	–1	0	0.00%
(Mexico) José Treviño	19 September 2011	23 October 2012	46	15	22	9	51	38	+13	67	56.52%
(Honduras) Reynaldo Clavasquín	23 October 2012	10 March 2013	20	8	6	6	22	18	+14	30	55.00%
(Mexico) Juan Castillo	10 March 2013	20 May 2013	6	3	1	2	12	11	+1	10	58.33%
(Serbia) Risto Vidaković	20 May 2013	6 November 2013	16	5	5	6	24	25	–1	20	46.88%
(Honduras) Milton Reyes	6 November 2013	23 November 2013	2	0	1	1	1	2	–1	1	25.00%
(Argentina) Diego Vásquez	23 November 2013	27 February 2022	350	180	96	74	588	359	+229	636	65.14%
(Honduras) César Obando	2 March 2022	19 March 2022	4	1	0	3	3	7	–4	3	25.00%
(Argentina) Hernán Medina	2 April 2022	1 February 2023	39	18	10	11	61	41	+20	64	58.97%
(Honduras) Ninrrol Medina	4 February 2023	5 September 2023	22	6	11	5	33	30	+3	29	52.27%
(Argentina) César Vigevani	5 September 2023	26 November 2023	12	7	1	4	22	13	+9	22	62.50%
(Argentina) Diego Vásquez	26 November 2023	11 August 2025	73	34	23	16	131	81	+50	125	62.33%
(Spain) Javier López	11 August 2025	present	61	32	17	12	103	65	+38	113	66.39%

== Others ==
- Highest home attendance: 37,371 v C.D. Olimpia, 26 August 2000
- Highest away attendance: 38,256 v C.D. Olimpia, 17 December 2006
- Lowest home attendance: 0 v several
- Lowest away attendance: 0 v several
