= 1959 Honduran Amateur League =

Honduran Amateur League
- Season: 1959
- Champions: Olimpia
- All statistics correct as of 16 November 1959.

The 1959 Honduran Amateur League was the twelfth edition of the Honduran Amateur League. C.D. Olimpia obtained its 3rd national title. The season ran from 1 February 1959 to 16 November 1959.

== Regional champions ==
Regional championship	Champions
Cortés	Marathón
Francisco Morazán	Olimpia
Yoro	Honduras

=== Known results ===
1959	Motagua	2–0	Olimpia	Tegucigalpa
CST				Stadium: Estadio Tiburcio Carías Andino

1959	Motagua	0–0	Olimpia	Tegucigalpa
CST				Stadium: Estadio Tiburcio Carías Andino

1959	Motagua	0–0	Troya	Tegucigalpa
CST				Stadium: Estadio Tiburcio Carías Andino

1959	Motagua	0–1	Troya	Tegucigalpa
CST				Stadium: Estadio Tiburcio Carías Andino

1959	Motagua	0–0	Argentina	Tegucigalpa
CST				Stadium: Estadio Tiburcio Carías Andino

1959	Olimpia	1–0	Argentina	Tegucigalpa
CST				Stadium: Estadio Tiburcio Carías Andino

1959	Olimpia	2–1	Argentina	Tegucigalpa
CST				Stadium: Estadio Tiburcio Carías Andino

1959	Olimpia	2–2	Troya	Tegucigalpa
CST				Stadium: Estadio Tiburcio Carías Andino

1959	Olimpia	1–1	Troya	Tegucigalpa
CST				Stadium: Estadio Tiburcio Carías Andino

1959	Olimpia	3–0	Gimnástico	Tegucigalpa
CST				Stadium: Estadio Tiburcio Carías Andino

1959	Olimpia	4–1	Gimnástico	Tegucigalpa
CST				Stadium: Estadio Tiburcio Carías Andino

1959	Olimpia	1–0	Federal	Tegucigalpa
CST				Stadium: Estadio Tiburcio Carías Andino

1959	Olimpia	2–0	Federal	Tegucigalpa
CST				Stadium: Estadio Tiburcio Carías Andino

1959 Extra match	Olimpia	1–0	Motagua	Tegucigalpa
CST	Rodríguez			Stadium: Estadio Tiburcio Carías Andino

== National championship round ==
Played in a double round-robin format between the regional champions. Also known as the Triangular.

Pos	Team	Pld	W	D	L	GF	GA	GD	Pts
1	Olimpia	3	3	0	0	6	1	+5	6
2	Marathón	0	0	0	0	0	0	0	0
3	Honduras	0	0	0	0	0	0	0	0

=== Known results ===
8 November 1959	Honduras	1–2	Olimpia	El Progreso
CST				Stadium: Estadio Humberto Micheletti

	Olimpia	3–0	Honduras	Tegucigalpa
CST				Stadium: Estadio Tiburcio Carías Andino

	Olimpia	1–0	Marathón	Tegucigalpa
CST				Stadium: Estadio Tiburcio Carías Andino

	Honduras	1–1	Marathón
CST

	Marathón	v	Olimpia	San Pedro Sula
CST				Stadium: Estadio Francisco Morazán
Note: Cancelled due to lack of interest as Olimpia had already won the title

== Olimpia's lineup ==
- Alonso Lanza
- Luis Servellón
- Guillermo Guerrero
- Jorge Zavala)
- René Rodríguez
- Carlos Meza
- Fausto Yu Shan
- Abraham Pavón
- Evelio Betancourth
- Felipe Barahona
- Andrés Salinas
- Carlos Castillo
- "Piti" Valle
- Efraín Salinas
- Roy Padilla
- Alberto Solís
- Marco Rosales
- Luis Oquelí
- Fernando Brenes
- Julio Iglesias
