= 1961 Honduran Amateur League =

Honduran Amateur League
- Season: 1961
- Champions: Olimpia
- All statistics correct as of 19 November 1961.

The 1961 Honduran Amateur League was the 14th edition of the Honduran Amateur League. Club Deportivo Olimpia obtained its 4th national title. The season ran from 9 March 1961 to 19 November 1961.

== Regional champions ==
Regional championship	Champions
Atlántida	Palermo
Cortés	Independiente
Francisco Morazán	Olimpia
Yoro	Lenca

=== Known results ===
16 April 1961	Argentina	2–0	Troya	Tegucigalpa
CST	Molina 65'			Stadium: Estadio Tiburcio Carías Andino; Referee: Cayetano Aguilar

16 April 1961	Federal	2–0	Gimnástico	Tegucigalpa
CST	Ávila 25'			Stadium: Estadio Tiburcio Carías Andino; Referee: Marco Cárcamo

23 April 1961	Olimpia	2–0	Motagua	Tegucigalpa
CST	Rodríguez 8'; Castillo 14'			Stadium: Estadio Tiburcio Carías Andino; Attendance: 2,190

1961	Motagua	1–0	Olimpia	Tegucigalpa
CST				Stadium: Estadio Tiburcio Carías Andino

== National championship round ==
Played in a double round-robin format between the regional champions. Also known as the Cuadrangular.

Pos	Team	Pld	W	D	L	GF	GA	GD	Pts
1	Olimpia	6	4	1	1	14	6	+8	9
2	Independiente	0	0	0	0	0	0	0	0
3	Lenca	0	0	0	0	0	0	0	0
4	Palermo	0	0	0	0	0	0	0	0

=== Known results ===
19 November 1961	Independiente	2–2	Olimpia	San Pedro Sula, Cortés
CST				Stadium: Estadio Francisco Morazán

	Olimpia	3–1	Independiente	Tegucigalpa, Francisco Morazán
CST				Stadium: Estadio Tiburcio Carías Andino

	Olimpia	4–1	Lenca
CST

	Olimpia	2–1	Lenca
CST

	Olimpia	3–0	Palermo
CST

	Olimpia	0–1	Palermo
CST

== Olimpia's lineup ==
- Roberto Crisanto
- Marco Rosales
- Alberto Solís
- Federico Budde
- Fernando Brenes
- Jacobo Godoy
- Luis Oquelí
- René Rodríguez
- Marco Midence
- Fernando Zelaya
- Carlos Castillo
- Will Garcia
- Marco Fu
- Abraham Pavón
- Ronald Leaky
- Ricardo Rodríguez
- Donaldo Rosales
- Carlos Meza
- Andrés Salinas
- Carlos Alvarado
- Ricardo Taylor
- Felipe Barahona
- Luis Servellón
- Carlos Suazo
- Reinaldo Centeno
- Henry Elvir
