= 1958–59 Honduran Amateur League =

Honduran football season

Honduran Amateur League
- Season: 1958–59
- Champions: Olimpia
- All statistics correct as of 11 March 1959.

The 1958–59 Honduran Amateur League was the eleventh edition of the Honduran Amateur League. C.D. Olimpia obtained its 2nd national title. The season ran from 23 March 1958 to 11 March 1959.

== Regional champions ==
Regional championship	Champions
Atlántida	Ferrocarril
Colón	Fortuna
Cortés	Independiente
Francisco Morazán	Olimpia
Yoro	Honduras

=== Known results ===
1958	Olimpia	4–0	Motagua	Tegucigalpa
CST				Stadium: Estadio Tiburcio Carías Andino

1958	Motagua	2–1	Olimpia	Tegucigalpa
CST	Bodden; Arzú		Lanza	Stadium: Estadio Tiburcio Carías Andino

1958	Olimpia	3–0	Troya	Tegucigalpa
CST				Stadium: Estadio Tiburcio Carías Andino

1958	Troya	1–0	Olimpia	Tegucigalpa
CST				Stadium: Estadio Tiburcio Carías Andino

1958	Olimpia	3–1	Argentina	Tegucigalpa
CST				Stadium: Estadio Tiburcio Carías Andino

1958	Olimpia	5–1	Argentina	Tegucigalpa
CST				Stadium: Estadio Tiburcio Carías Andino

1958	Olimpia	1–0	Federal	Tegucigalpa
CST				Stadium: Estadio Tiburcio Carías Andino

1958	Olimpia	1–1	Federal	Tegucigalpa
CST				Stadium: Estadio Tiburcio Carías Andino

1958	Olimpia	4–0	Gimnástico	Tegucigalpa
CST				Stadium: Estadio Tiburcio Carías Andino

1958	Olimpia	3–0	Gimnástico	Tegucigalpa
CST				Stadium: Estadio Tiburcio Carías Andino

== National championship round ==
Played in a double round-robin format between the regional champions. Also known as the Pentagonal. After their first two matches, C.D. Fortuna retired from the competition and their results were annulled.

Pos	Team	Pld	W	D	L	GF	GA	GD	Pts
1	Olimpia	6	5	1	0	15	5	+10	11
2	Honduras	0	0	0	0	0	0	0	0
3	Independiente	0	0	0	0	0	0	0	0
4	Ferrocarril	0	0	0	0	0	0	0	0
5	Fortuna	2	0	0	2	1	5	−4	0

=== Known results ===
15 February 1959	Olimpia	2–0	Independiente
CST

1959	Independiente	1–3	Olimpia
CST

1959	Olimpia	3–1	Ferrocarril
CST

1959	Ferrocarril	0–2	Olimpia
CST

1959	Olimpia	3–1	Honduras	Tegucigalpa
CST				Stadium: Estadio Tiburcio Carías Andino

1959	Honduras	2–2	Olimpia	El Progreso
CST				Stadium: Estadio Humberto Micheletti

1959	Olimpia	2–0	Fortuna
CST
Note: annulled

1959	Independiente	3–1	Fortuna
CST
Note: annulled

== Olimpia's lineup ==
- Carlos Suazo
- Melvin Price
- Carlos Castillo
- Luis Servellón
- Roy Padilla
- Evelio Betancourth
- Alberto Solís
- Carlos Meza
- Marco Rosales
- Fernando Brenes
- Héctor Pacheco
- Edgardo Ruiz
- Fernando Gómez
- Jorge Zavala
- Abraham Pavón
- Andrés Salinas
- Alonso Lanza
- Efraín Salinas
- Luis Oquelí
- Ricardo Brooks
