= 1965–66 C.D. Platense season =

Platense
1965–66 season
- Manager: Carlos Padilla
- Liga Nacional: Winners
Home colours
- All statistics correct as of 23 January 1966.

The 1965–66 season was C.D. Platense's 5th season in existence and the club's 1st season in the top fight of Honduran football. The club obtained its first national title and became the first Honduran professional champions.

== Squad ==
1965–66 squad
León Jallú, Ricardo Fúnez, Miguel Howell, Gustavo Croasdaile, Francisco Brocato, Gilberto Solís, Federico Anderson, Gilberto Zavala, Roosevelt Garbuth, Alexander Guillén, "Chita" Arzú, Santos Díaz, Raúl Betancourt, Eduardo Murillo, Carlos Alvarado, Tomás Máximo, "Choloma" Romero, Félix Guerra. Coach: Carlos Padilla.

== Results ==
18 July 1965 Round 1	Platense	6–2	La Salle	Puerto Cortés, Cortés
15:00 CST	Betancourt; Guerra; Zavala; Fúnez		Henderson; Grey	Stadium: Estadio Excélsior

25 July 1965 Round 2	Atlético Español	1–1	Platense	Tegucigalpa, Francisco Morazán
CST	Gómez		Máximo	Stadium: Estadio Tiburcio Carías Andino

1 August 1965 Round 2	Vida	2–0	Platense	La Ceiba, Atlántida
CST	Garden			Stadium: Estadio Nilmo Edwards

8 August 1965 Round 4	Platense	3–0	Marathón	Puerto Cortés, Cortés
CST	Guerra; Díaz			Stadium: Estadio Excélsior

15 August 1965 Round 5	Motagua	0–2	Platense	Tegucigalpa, Francisco Morazán
CST			Garay; Doblado	Stadium: Estadio Tiburcio Carías Andino

22 August 1965 Round 6	Platense	3–2	España	Puerto Cortés, Cortés
CST	Guerra; Díaz; Romero		Handal; Lara	Stadium: Estadio Excélsior

29 August 1965 Round 7	Platense	3–1	Troya	Puerto Cortés, Cortés
CST	Romero; Arzú		Martínez	Stadium: Estadio Excélsior

5 September 1965 Round 8	Olimpia	1–1	Platense	Tegucigalpa, Francisco Morazán
CST	Suazo		Guerra	Stadium: Estadio Tiburcio Carías Andino

Round 9	Honduras	2–3	Platense	El Progreso, Yoro
CST				Stadium: Estadio Humberto Micheletti

17 October 1965 Round 10	Platense	5–3	Honduras	Puerto Cortés, Cortés
CST				Stadium: Estadio Excélsior

Round 11	Troya	0–0	Platense	Tegucigalpa, Francisco Morazán
CST				Stadium: Estadio Tiburcio Carías Andino

Round 12	La Salle	2–3	Platense	San Pedro Sula, Cortés
CST				Stadium: Estadio Francisco Morazán

Round 13	Platense	1–1	Vida	Puerto Cortés, Cortés
CST				Stadium: Estadio Excélsior

Round 14	Platense	2–1	Atlético Español	Puerto Cortés, Cortés
CST				Stadium: Estadio Excélsior

Round 15	Platense	1–0	Motagua	Puerto Cortés, Cortés
CST				Stadium: Estadio Excélsior

2 January 1966 Round 16	Marathón	2–5	Platense	El Progreso, Yoro
CST				Stadium: Estadio Humberto Micheletti

Round 17	Platense	1–2	Olimpia	El Progreso, Yoro
CST	Arzú		Reyes; Rosales	Stadium: Estadio Humberto Micheletti

23 January 1966 Round 18	España	1–2	Platense	El Progreso, Yoro
CST	Peri		Guerra; Díaz	Stadium: Estadio Humberto Micheletti

== Statistics ==
- As of 23 January 1966

Competition	GP	GW	GD	GL	GS	GC	GD	CS	SG	Per
League	18	11	5	2	42	23	+19	5	2	75.00%
