= 1957–58 Honduran Amateur League =

Honduran Amateur League
- Season: 1957–58
- Champions: Olimpia
- All statistics correct as of 16 February 1958.

The 1957–58 Honduran Amateur League was the tenth edition of the Honduran Amateur League. Club Deportivo Olimpia obtained its 1st national title. The season ran from 17 February 1957 to 16 February 1958.

== Regional champions ==
Regional championship	Champions
Atlántida / Colón	Vida
Cortés	Hibueras
Francisco Morazán	Olimpia
Yoro	Honduras

=== Known results ===
1957	Olimpia	1–0	Motagua	Tegucigalpa
CST	Oquelí			Stadium: Estadio Tiburcio Carías Andino

1957	Olimpia	4–1	Motagua	Tegucigalpa
CST	Price; Meza; Betancourth		Uclés	Stadium: Estadio Tiburcio Carías Andino

1957	Olimpia	1–1	Federal	Tegucigalpa
CST				Stadium: Estadio Tiburcio Carías Andino

1957	Olimpia	3–4	Troya	Tegucigalpa
CST				Stadium: Estadio Tiburcio Carías Andino

== National championship round ==
Played in a double round-robin format between the regional champions. Also known as the Cuadrangular.

Pos	Team	Pld	W	D	L	GF	GA	GD	Pts
1	Olimpia	0	0	0	0	0	0	0	0
2	Hibueras	0	0	0	0	0	0	0	0
3	Honduras	0	0	0	0	0	0	0	0
4	Vida	0	0	0	0	0	0	0	0

=== Known results ===
	Olimpia	2–0	Hibueras	Tegucigalpa
CST	Suazo; Price			Stadium: Estadio Tiburcio Carías Andino

	Hibueras	1–5	Olimpia	San Pedro Sula
CST	Hernández (pen.)		(o.g.) Reyes; Oquelí; Meza; Suazo; Pavón	Stadium: Estadio Francisco Morazán

== Olimpia's lineup ==
- Melvin Price
- Carlos Suazo
- Wilfredo García
- Efraín Salinas
- Fernando Brenes
- Roy Padilla
- Reinaldo Centeno
- Héctor Pacheco
- Carlos Castillo
- Luis Oquelí
- Carlos Durón
- Andrés Salinas
- Abraham Pavón
- Carlos Meza
- Evelio Betancourth
- Alberto Solís
- Jorge Zavala
