= 1964 Honduran Amateur League =

Honduran Amateur League
- Season: 1964
- Champions: Olimpia
- All statistics correct as of 20 December 1964.

The 1964 Honduran Amateur League was the 17th and last edition of the Honduran Amateur League. Club Deportivo Olimpia obtained its 6th national title. The season ran from 19 April to 20 December 1964.

== Regional champions ==
Regional championship	Champions
Atlántida	Vida
Choluteca	América
Cortés	Platense
Francisco Morazán	Olimpia
Valle	Libertad
Yoro	Honduras

=== Known results ===
1964	Olimpia	2–1	Motagua	Tegucigalpa, Francisco Morazán
CST	Budde; Flores		García	Stadium: Estadio Tiburcio Carías Andino

1964	Olimpia	3–0	Motagua	Tegucigalpa, Francisco Morazán
CST	Suazo; Álvarez; Flores			Stadium: Estadio Tiburcio Carías Andino

1964	Olimpia	7–0	Troya	Tegucigalpa, Francisco Morazán
CST	Taylor; Rodríguez; Flores			Stadium: Estadio Tiburcio Carías Andino

1964	Platense	1–0	Marathón
CST

1964	Platense	2–0	Marathón
CST

== Second round ==
Played in two sub-groups of three teams each between the regional champions where the winners advanced to the Final.

North group
Pos	Team	Pld	W	D	L	GF	GA	GD	Pts
1	Platense	2	1	1	0	3	1	+2	3
2	Honduras	2	1	0	1	3	4	−1	2
3	Vida	2	0	1	1	2	5	−3	1

South group
Pos	Team	Pld	W	D	L	GF	GA	GD	Pts
1	Olimpia	0	0	0	0	0	0	0	0
2	América	0	0	0	0	0	0	0	0
3	Libertad	0	0	0	0	0	0	0	0

=== Known results ===
1964	Platense	3–1	Yoro
CST

1964	Platense	0–0	Vida
CST

1964	Honduras	2–1	Vida
CST

== Final ==
Played in a series of three games.

6 December 1964 1st leg	Platense	0–1	Olimpia	San Pedro Sula, Cortés
CST			22' Taylor	Stadium: Estadio Francisco Morazán

13 December 1964 2nd leg	Platense	0–0	Olimpia	San Pedro Sula, Cortés
CST				Stadium: Estadio Francisco Morazán

20 December 1964 3rd leg	Platense	0–2	Olimpia	San Pedro Sula, Cortés
CST			Taylor	Stadium: Estadio Francisco Morazán

== Olimpia's lineup ==
- Augusto Álvarez
- Ricardo Taylor
- Alberto Solís
- Carlos Suazo
- Marco Rosales
- Conrado Flores
- Federico Budde
- Carlos Castillo
- Felipe Barahona
- René Rodríguez
- Roberto Crisanto
- Gilberto Aquino
- Arnox Chessman
- Raúl Suazo
- Jorge Bustillo
- Reiner Trost (GER)
- Reinaldo Centeno
- Donaldo Rosales
- Marco Midence
