= 1963–64 Honduran Amateur League =

Honduran Amateur League
- Season: 1963–64
- Champions: Olimpia
- All statistics correct as of 2 February 1964.

The 1963–64 Honduran Amateur League was the 16th edition of the Honduran Amateur League. Club Deportivo Olimpia obtained its 5th national title. The season ran from 1 March 1963 to 2 February 1964.

== Regional champions ==
Regional championship	Champions
Atlántida	Victoria
Choluteca	Chorotega
Cortés	España
Francisco Morazán	Olimpia
Valle	Libertad
Yoro	Honduras

=== Known results ===
1963	Olimpia	3–2	Motagua	Tegucigalpa, Francisco Morazán
CST	R. Suazo; Rosales; C. Suazo		M. García; T. Garcia	Stadium: Estadio Tiburcio Carías Andino

1963	Olimpia	3–1	Motagua	Tegucigalpa, Francisco Morazán
CST	Meza; Barahona; Suazo		Banegas	Stadium: Estadio Tiburcio Carías Andino

== Second round ==
Played in two sub-groups of three teams each between the regional champions where the winners advanced to the Final.

North group
Pos	Team	Pld	W	D	L	GF	GA	GD	Pts
1	España	0	0	0	0	0	0	0	0
2	Honduras	0	0	0	0	0	0	0	0
3	Victoria	0	0	0	0	0	0	0	0

South group
Pos	Team	Pld	W	D	L	GF	GA	GD	Pts
1	Olimpia	2	2	0	0	13	2	+11	4
2	Chorotega	0	0	0	0	0	0	0	0
3	Libertad	0	0	0	0	0	0	0	0

=== Known results ===
	Olimpia	10–0	Chorotega	Tegucigalpa, Francisco Morazán
CST				Stadium: Estadio Tiburcio Carías Andino

	Olimpia	3–2	Libertad	Tegucigalpa, Francisco Morazán
CST				Stadium: Estadio Tiburcio Carías Andino

== Final ==
Played in a series of three games.

19 January 1964 1st leg	España	0–0	Olimpia	San Pedro Sula, Cortés
CST				Stadium: Estadio Francisco Morazán

26 January 1964 2nd leg	Olimpia	1–0	España	Tegucigalpa, Francisco Morazán
CST	Rosales 52'			Stadium: Estadio Tiburcio Carías Andino

2 February 1964 3rd leg	Olimpia	0–0	España	Tegucigalpa, Francisco Morazán
CST				Stadium: Estadio Tiburcio Carías Andino

== Olimpia's lineup ==
- Roberto Crisanto
- Fernando Brenes
- Federico Budde
- Gilberto Aquino
- Roberto Hernández
- Alberto Solís
- Donaldo Rosales
- Carlos Castillo
- Raúl Suazo
- Samuel Nolasco
- Ricardo Taylor
- Reinaldo Centeno
- Marco Rosales
- Arnox Chessman
- Felipe Barahona
- Carlos Suazo
- Marco Midence
- Jorge Bustillo
- René Rodríguez
- Augusto Álvarez
- Carlos Meza
