= 1965–66 Honduran Liga Nacional =

Liga Nacional
- Season: 1965–66
- Champions: Platense (1st)
- Relegated: None
- Matches: 90
- Goals: 265 (2.94 per match)
- Top goalscorer: Grey (14)
- Biggest home win: OLI 10–2 LSA (29 August 1965)
- Highest scoring: OLI 10–2 LSA (29 August 1965)
- All statistics correct as of 23 January 1966.

The 1965–66 Honduran Liga Nacional season was the inaugural edition of the Honduran Liga Nacional. The season ran from 18 July 1965 to 23 January 1966. The format of the tournament consisted of a double round-robin schedule. Platense F.C. won the title after defeating España 2–0 in the last round at El Progreso.

== Background ==
In 1964, a triangular tournament was organized between three clubs from the Liga Dionisio de Herrera between C.D.S. Vida, C.D. Victoria and C.D. Atlántida; having Vida qualified for the 1965–66 league.

== 1965–66 teams ==
- Atlético Español (Tegucigalpa)
- España (San Pedro Sula)
- Honduras (El Progreso)
- La Salle (San Pedro Sula)
- Marathón (San Pedro Sula)
- Motagua (Tegucigalpa)
- Olimpia (Tegucigalpa)
- Platense (Puerto Cortés)
- Troya (Tegucigalpa)
- Vida (La Ceiba)

== Regular season ==
=== Standings ===
Pos	Team	Pld	W	D	L	GF	GA	GD	Pts	Qualification or relegation
1	Platense	18	11	5	2	42	23	+19	27	No international qualification
2	Olimpia	18	10	6	2	35	14	+21	26	
3	Vida	18	8	6	4	24	17	+7	22	
4	Troya	18	8	6	4	18	14	+4	22	
5	España	18	9	3	6	29	20	+9	21	
6	Honduras	18	8	3	7	26	25	+1	19	
7	Marathón	18	5	2	11	22	35	−13	12	
8	La Salle	18	5	2	11	28	50	−22	12	
9	Motagua	18	3	4	11	14	25	−11	10	
10	Atlético Español	18	2	5	11	28	45	−17	9	No relegation

Updated to match(es) played on 23 January 1966. Source:
- Winners: Platense (won regular season)
- Runners-up: Olimpia
- Last: Atlético Español (no relegation)

1965–66 Liga Nacional winners
Platense
1st title

=== Round 1 ===
18 July 1965	Honduras	3–0	Atlético Español	El Progreso
	Deras 5' 65'; Perdomo 70'			Stadium: Estadio Humberto Micheletti

18 July 1965	Platense	6–2	La Salle	Puerto Cortés
15:00	Guerra 6' 65' 74'; Betancourt 29'; Zavala 69'; Fúnez 85'		16' Henderson; 84' Grey	Stadium: Estadio Excélsior; Referee: José Carranza

18 July 1965	Vida	4–1	Motagua	La Ceiba
	Garden 64'; Brooks 75' 82'; Blanco 85'; Starting XI (GK) K. Brooks; Zelaya; Gutiérrez; Banegas; Maradiaga; (substituted off) Marshall; C. Brooks; Blanco; Rodríguez; Amaya; Garden; Substitutes; (substituted on) Juárez; (substituted on) Edwards; Coach; Bernárdez (HON)		9' Castillo Starting XI; Canales (GK); Godoy; Benavídez; A. Navarro; M. Banegas; F. Navarro (substituted off); Chávez; García; Martínez; Castillo; E. Banegas; Substitutes; Yusan (substituted on); Ramos (substituted on); Coach (HON) Enríquez	Stadium: Estadio Nilmo Edwards; Referee: Raúl Cubas

18 July 1965	España	1–0	Troya	San Pedro Sula
	Handal 7'			Stadium: Estadio General Francisco Morazán; Referee: Gilberto Reyes

18 July 1965	Olimpia	3–0	Marathón	Tegucigalpa
	Rodríguez 8' 75'; Ferrera			Stadium: Estadio Tiburcio Carías Andino; Referee: Concepción Ayala

=== Round 2 ===
25 July 1965	La Salle	1–2	Vida	San Pedro Sula, Cortés
	Perdomo		Amaya; Juárez	Stadium: Estadio Francisco Morazán

25 July 1965	España	2–1	Marathón	San Pedro Sula, Cortés
	Handal; Cruz		Caballero	Stadium: Estadio Francisco Morazán

25 July 1965	Atlético Español	1–1	Platense	Tegucigalpa, Francisco Morazán
	Gómez		Máximo	Stadium: Estadio Tiburcio Carías Andino

25 July 1965	Motagua	1–1	Troya	Tegucigalpa, Francisco Morazán
	Banegas		Martínez	Stadium: Estadio Tiburcio Carías Andino

19 September 1965	Honduras	1–2	Olimpia	El Progreso, Yoro
	Deras		Iglesias; Rosales	Stadium: Estadio Humberto Micheletti

=== Round 3 ===
1 August 1965	Vida	2–0	Platense	La Ceiba, Atlántida
	Garden			Stadium: Estadio Nilmo Edwards

1 August 1965	La Salle	1–2	Honduras	San Pedro Sula, Cortés
	Vásquez		Avila	Stadium: Estadio Francisco Morazán

1 August 1965	Marathón	2–0	Motagua	San Pedro Sula, Cortés
	Rivera; Maldonado			Stadium: Estadio Francisco Morazán

1 August 1965	Troya	2–0	Atlético Español	Tegucigalpa, Francisco Morazán
	Triminio; Calderini			Stadium: Estadio Tiburcio Carías Andino

1 August 1965	Olimpia	3–1	España	Tegucigalpa, Francisco Morazán
	Rodríguez; Rosales; Flores		Cruz	Stadium: Estadio Tiburcio Carías Andino

=== Round 4 ===
8 August 1965	Honduras	1–1	Troya	El Progreso, Yoro
	Millares		Cabrera	Stadium: Estadio Humberto Micheletti

8 August 1965	Platense	3–0	Marathón	Puerto Cortés, Cortés
	Guerra; Díaz			Stadium: Estadio Excélsior

8 August 1965	España	6–1	La Salle	San Pedro Sula, Cortés
	Cruz; Lara; Handal; Castro		Hernández	Stadium: Estadio Francisco Morazán

8 August 1965	Atlético Español	0–1	Vida	Tegucigalpa, Francisco Morazán
			Brooks	Stadium: Estadio Tiburcio Carías Andino

8 August 1965	Olimpia	3–0	Motagua	Tegucigalpa, Francisco Morazán
	Suazo; Rosales; Taylor			Stadium: Estadio Tiburcio Carías Andino

=== Round 5 ===
15 August 1965	Vida	2–0	Troya	La Ceiba, Atlántida
	Juárez; Brooks			Stadium: Estadio Nilmo Edwards

15 August 1965	España	1–0	Honduras	San Pedro Sula, Cortés
	Rodríguez			Stadium: Estadio Francisco Morazán

15 August 1965	Marathón	4–2	La Salle	San Pedro Sula, Cortés
	Gómez; Arzú; Cruz; Caballero		Grey	Stadium: Estadio Francisco Morazán

15 August 1965	Olimpia	0–0	Atlético Español	Tegucigalpa, Francisco Morazán
				Stadium: Estadio Tiburcio Carías Andino

15 August 1965	Motagua	0–2	Platense	Tegucigalpa, Francisco Morazán
			Garay; Doblado	Stadium: Estadio Tiburcio Carías Andino

=== Round 6 ===
22 August 1965	Platense	3–2	España	Puerto Cortés, Cortés
	Guerra; Díaz; Romero		Handal; Lara	Stadium: Estadio Excélsior

22 August 1965	Vida	0–0	Olimpia	La Ceiba, Atlántida
				Stadium: Estadio Nilmo Edwards

22 August 1965	Marathón	0–0	Troya	San Pedro Sula, Cortés
				Stadium: Estadio Francisco Morazán

22 August 1965	La Salle	2–0	Atlético Español	San Pedro Sula, Cortés
	Grey; Cobos			Stadium: Estadio Francisco Morazán

22 August 1965	Motagua	0–1	Honduras	Tegucigalpa, Francisco Morazán
			Millares	Stadium: Estadio Tiburcio Carías Andino

=== Round 7 ===
29 August 1965	Honduras	2–1	Marathón	El Progreso, Yoro
	Millares; Chávez		Fonseca	Stadium: Estadio Humberto Micheletti

29 August 1965	Platense	3–1	Troya	Puerto Cortés, Cortés
	Romero; Arzú		Martínez	Stadium: Estadio Excélsior

29 August 1965	España	3–0	Vida	San Pedro Sula, Cortés
	Cruz; Acosta			Stadium: Estadio Francisco Morazán

29 August 1965	Atlético Español	2–0	Motagua	Tegucigalpa, Francisco Morazán
	Cárdenas; Gómez			Stadium: Estadio Tiburcio Carías Andino

29 August 1965	Olimpia	10–2	La Salle	Tegucigalpa, Francisco Morazán
	Suazo; Rosales; Suazo; Bustillo		Grey	Stadium: Estadio Tiburcio Carías Andino

=== Round 8 ===
5 September 1965	Vida	0–0	Honduras	La Ceiba, Atlántida
				Stadium: Estadio Nilmo Edwards

5 September 1965	La Salle	1–1	Troya	San Pedro Sula, Cortés
	Hernández		Calderini	Stadium: Estadio Francisco Morazán

5 September 1965	España	0–2	Motagua	San Pedro Sula, Cortés
			Banegas	Stadium: Estadio Francisco Morazán

5 September 1965	Atlético Español	2–1	Marathón	Tegucigalpa, Francisco Morazán
	Cárdenas; Flores		Cruz	Stadium: Estadio Tiburcio Carías Andino

5 September 1965	Olimpia	1–1	Platense	Tegucigalpa, Francisco Morazán
	Suazo		Guerra	Stadium: Estadio Tiburcio Carías Andino

== Top scorer ==
- (Honduras) Henry Grey Fúnez (La Salle) with 14 goals

== Squads ==
1965–66 squads
Atlético Español
- (Honduras) José Herrera
- (Honduras) Jorge Rosales
- (Honduras) Joaquín Bulnes
- (Honduras) Francisco Gómez
- (Honduras) Fernando Bulnes
- (Honduras) Ramón Raudales
- (Honduras) Arturo Uclés
- (Honduras) Raúl Cárdenas
- (Honduras) Jesús Flores
- (Honduras) Rolando Rodríguez
- (Honduras) Manuel Bulnes
España
- (Honduras) Carlos Handal
- (Honduras) Carlos Acosta
- (Honduras) Raúl Peri
- (Honduras) José Colón
- (Honduras) Armando Palacios
- (Honduras) Pedro Rivas
- (Honduras) Dolores Cruz
- (Honduras) Mariano Aguiluz
- (Honduras) Vidal Canales
- (Honduras) Augusto Palacios
- (Honduras) Mario Sandoval
- (Honduras) Héctor Gómez
- (Honduras) Luis Castro
- (Honduras) Ramón Oviedo
- (Honduras) Salvador Reyes
- (Honduras) Javier Rodríguez
- (Honduras) Insider Rodas
Honduras
- (Honduras) Gil Valerio
- (Honduras) René Flores
- (Honduras) Santos Juárez
- (Honduras) Jorge Deras
- (Honduras) Domingo Ramos
- (Honduras) Rolando Chávez
- (Honduras) Pablo Perdomo
- (Honduras) Norris Bodden
- (Honduras) Andrés Ávila
- (Honduras) Pedro Deras
- (Honduras) Getulio Millares
La Salle
- (Honduras) Ricando Sandoval
- (Honduras) Víctor Henderson
- (Honduras) Héctor Castro
- (Honduras) Ástor Perdomo
- (Honduras) Leonardo Vásquez
- (Honduras) Ramón Hernández
- (Honduras) Carlos Cobos
- (Honduras) Víctor Castro
- (Honduras) Luis Metzgen
- (Honduras) Ricardo Montalván
- (Honduras) Mario Tróchez
- (Honduras) Israel Juárez
- (Honduras) Santiago Rodríguez
- (Honduras) Salvador Azcúnaga
- (Honduras) Getulio Millares
- (Honduras) Miguel Pavón
- (Honduras) Adalberto Menjívar
- (Honduras) Henry Fúnez
Marathón
- (Honduras) Martín Rodríguez
- (Honduras) Mario Caballero
- (Honduras) Victoriano Arzú
- (Honduras) Mauro Caballero
- (Honduras) Sigfrido Vargas
- (Honduras) Ernesto Cabús
- (Honduras) René Cruz
- (Honduras) Mario Rivera
- (Honduras) Rafael Maldonado
- (Honduras) Ernesto López
- (Honduras) Ernesto Licona
- (Honduras) Héctor Chávez
- (Honduras) Julio Fonseca
- (Honduras) Augusto Domínguez
- (Honduras) Andrés Arzú
- (Honduras) Emilio Cruz
- (Honduras) Pedro Flores
- (Honduras) Jorge Durón
- (Honduras) Elías Carbajal
Motagua
- (Honduras) Porfirio Canales
- (Honduras) Blanco
- (Honduras) Jacobo Godoy
- (Honduras) Nelson Benavídez
- (Honduras) Alfonso Navarro
- (Honduras) Marcio Ramos
- (Honduras) Héctor Chávez
- (Honduras) Marcos Banegas
- (Honduras) Elio Banegas
- (Honduras) Mario García
- (Honduras) Amado Castillo
- (Honduras) Fermín Navarro
- (Honduras) Jorge Berríos
- (Honduras) Marco Callizo
- (Honduras) Ernesto Henríquez
- (Honduras) Juan Martínez
- (Honduras) Ricardo Cárdenas
- (Honduras) José Castillo
Olimpia
- (Honduras) Marco Rosales
- (Honduras) Ronald Chessman
- (Honduras) Raúl Suazo
- (Honduras) Ricardo Reyes
- (Honduras) Conrado Flores
- (Honduras) Juan Lanza
- (Honduras) Reyando Centeno
- (Honduras) Domingo Ferrera
- (Honduras) "Pibe" Midence
- (Honduras) Donaldo Rosales
- (Honduras) Ricardo Taylor
- (Honduras) Federico Budde
- (Honduras) Rafael Dick
- (Honduras) Carlos Suazo
- (Honduras) Jorge Bustillo
- (Costa Rica) Santiago Tercero
- (Honduras) Roberto Crisanto
Platense
- (Honduras) Alexander Guillén
- (Honduras) Víctor León
- (Honduras) Santos Díaz
- (Honduras) Roosevelth Garbuth
- (Honduras) Carlos Alvarado
- (Honduras) Raúl Betancourt
- (Honduras) Gilberto Zavala
- (Honduras) Carlos Duarte
- (Honduras) Héctor Hernández
- (Honduras) José Duarte
- (Honduras) Félix Guerra
- (Honduras) Francisco Garay
- (Honduras) Ricardo Fúnez
- (Honduras) Gustavo Croisdale
- (Honduras) Francisco Brocato
- (Honduras) Pablo Arzú
- (Honduras) Carlos Romero
- (Honduras) Tomás Máximo
- (Honduras) Justo Prieto
- (Honduras) José Garay
- (Honduras) José Murillo
- (Honduras) Julio Anderson
- (Honduras) Jorge Solís
- (Honduras) Armando Doblado
- (Honduras) Miguel Howel
Troya
- (Guatemala) Emilio Calderini
- (Honduras) Jorge Cabrera
Vida
- (Honduras) Tomás Marshall
- (Honduras) Israel Juárez
- (Honduras) Morris Garden
- (Honduras) Alberto Amaya
- (Honduras) Arturo Garden
- (Honduras) Jesús Fuentes
- (Honduras) Joe Hendicks
- (Honduras) Cristóbal Brooks
- (Honduras) Jesús Blanco
- (Honduras) Antonio Urbina
- (Honduras) Óscar Banegas

== Curiosities ==
On 24 October 1965, the match between F.C. Motagua and C.D. España was interrupted for several minutes due to a deflated ball. Since there were no additional balls, the match had to be briefly suspended while the only ball was being re-inflated in a close by gas station.
