= 1966–67 Honduran Liga Nacional =

Liga Nacional
- Season: 1966–67
- Champions: Olimpia (1st)
- Relegated: Troya
- CONCACAF Champions' Cup: Olimpia
- Matches: 90
- Goals: 277 (3.08 per match)
- Top goalscorer: Caballero (12)

The 1966–67 Honduran Liga Nacional season was the 2nd edition of the Honduran Liga Nacional. The format of the tournament remained the same as the previous season. Club Deportivo Olimpia won the title and qualified to the 1967 CONCACAF Champions' Cup.

== 1966–67 teams ==
- C.D. Atlético Español (Tegucigalpa)
- C.D. España (San Pedro Sula)
- C.D. Honduras (El Progreso)
- C.D. Marathón (San Pedro Sula)
- C.D. Motagua (Tegucigalpa)
- C.D. Olimpia (Tegucigalpa)
- C.D. Platense (Puerto Cortés)
- C.D. San Pedro (San Pedro Sula)
- C.D. Troya (Tegucigalpa)
- C.D.S. Vida (La Ceiba)

== Regular season ==
=== Standings ===
Pos	Team	Pld	W	D	L	GF	GA	GD	Pts	Qualification or relegation
1	Olimpia (Note: Olimpia champions as regular season winner)	18	14	1	3	35	19	+16	29	Qualified to the 1967 CONCACAF Champions' Cup
2	Marathón (Note: Marathón runner-up as second place in regular season)	18	9	5	4	42	27	+15	23	
3	Vida	18	6	7	5	31	26	+5	19	
4	España	18	7	5	6	25	21	+4	19	
5	San Pedro	18	5	8	5	31	32	−1	18	
6	Honduras	18	7	4	7	25	30	−5	18	
7	Atlético Español	18	6	4	8	25	31	−6	16	
8	Platense	18	6	4	8	25	31	−6	16	
9	Motagua	18	5	3	10	24	31	−7	13	
10	Troya	18	3	4	11	14	30	−16	10	Relegated to the Segunda División (Note: Troya relegated as finishing last in regular season)

Notes:

Liga Nacional
1966–67 Champion
Olimpia
1st title

== Top scorer ==
- (Honduras) Mauro Caballero (Marathón) with 12 goals

== Squads ==
1966–67 squads
Atlético Español
- (Honduras) Humberto Amador
- (Honduras) Salvador Irías
España
- (Honduras) Mariano Aguiluz
- (Honduras) Carlos Acosta
- (Honduras) Vidal Canales
- (Honduras) José Colón
- (Honduras) Dolores Cruz
- (Honduras) Héctor Gómez
- (Honduras) Carlos Handal
- (Honduras) René Orellana
- (Honduras) Armindo Palacios
- (Honduras) Augusto Palacios
- (Honduras) Raúl Peri
- (Argentina) Pedro Rivas
- (Honduras) Mario Sandoval
Honduras
- (Honduras) Pedro Deras
- (Honduras) Domingo Ramos
- (Honduras) Jacobo Sarmiento
- (Honduras) Óscar Trejo
Marathón
- (Honduras) Martín Rodríguez
- (Honduras) Mauro Caballero
- (Honduras) José Shubert
- (Honduras) Emilio Ramos
- (Honduras) Julio Iglesias
- (Honduras) Franklin Meza
- (Honduras) René Cruz
- (Honduras) Mario Caballero
- (Honduras) Julio Fonseca
- (Honduras) Gil Valerio
- (Honduras) Edgardo Doblado
- (Honduras) Germán Chávez
- (Honduras) Arnold Cabús
- (Honduras) Ramón Cano
Motagua
- (Honduras) Ricardo Cárdenas
- (Honduras) José Castillo
- (Honduras) Amado Castillo
- (Honduras) Marcos Banegas
- (Honduras) "Chiquín" Hernández
- (Honduras) Elio Banegas
- (Honduras) Marcio Ramos
- (Honduras) José García
- (Honduras) Alfonso Navarro
- (Honduras) Luís Metzquín
- (Honduras) Nelson Benavídez
- (Honduras) Jesús Castillo
- (Honduras) Antonio Jerez
- (Honduras) Fermín Navarro
- (Honduras) Roberto Jerez
- (Honduras) Jacobo Godoy
- (Honduras) Marco Callizo
- (Honduras) Jorge Berríos
- (Honduras) José Miralda
- (Honduras) Lenard Wells
Olimpia
- (Honduras) Ronald Chessman
- (Honduras) Ricardo Taylor
- (Honduras) Augusto Álvarez
- (Honduras) Conrado Flores
- (Honduras) Rigoberto Gómez
- (Honduras) Ángel Rodríguez
- (Honduras) Federico Budde
- (Honduras) Domingo Ferrera
- (Honduras) Raúl Suazo
- (Honduras) Roberto Crisanto
- (Honduras) "Plitis" Bonilla
- (Honduras) Miguel Matamoros
- (Honduras) Marco Mendoza
- (Honduras) Rafael Dick
- (Honduras) Donaldo Rosales
- (Honduras) René Rodríguez
- (Honduras) David McCalla
- (Honduras) Hermes Bertrand
- (Honduras) Carlos Suazo
- (Honduras) Juan Lanza
- (Honduras) Reynaldo Centeno
- (Honduras) Marco Rosales
- (Honduras) Juan Aguilar
Platense
- (Honduras) Alexander Guillén
- (Honduras) Víctor León
- (Honduras) Tomás Máximo
- (Honduras) Modesto Urbina
- (Honduras) José Duarte
- (Honduras) Ricardo Fúnez
- (Honduras) Pablo Arzú
- (Honduras) Héctor Hernández
- (Honduras) Carlos Duarte
- (Honduras) Félix Guerra
- (Honduras) Francisco Brocato
- (Honduras) Eduardo Flashing
- (Honduras) Carlos Alvarado
- (Honduras) Jimmy Steward
San Pedro
- (Honduras) Víctor Handerson
- (Honduras) Héctor Castro
- (Honduras) Ástor Perdomo
- (Honduras) Leonardo Vásquez
- (Honduras) Román Hernández
- (Honduras) Carlos Cobos
- (Honduras) Víctor Castro
- (Honduras) Luís Metzgen
- (Honduras) Ricardo Montalván
- (Honduras) Mario Tróchez
- (Honduras) Israel Juárez
- (Honduras) Santiago Rodríguez
- (Honduras) Salvador Azcúnaga
- (Honduras) Getulio Millares
- (Honduras) Miguel Pavón
- (Honduras) Adalberto Menjívar
- (Honduras) Enrique Grey
Troya
- (Guatemala) Emilio Calderini
Vida
- (Honduras) Tomás Marshall
- (Honduras) Israel Juárez
- (Honduras) Morris Garden
- (Honduras) Alberto Amaya
- (Honduras) Arturo Garden
- (Honduras) Jesús Fuentes
- (Honduras) Joe Hendricks
- (Honduras) Cristóbal Brooks
- (Honduras) Jesús Blanco
- (Honduras) Antonio Urbina
- (Honduras) Óscar Banegas
- (Honduras) José Salinas

== Trivia ==
- La Salle changed its name to San Pedro
