= 1954–55 Honduran Amateur League =

Honduran Amateur League
- Season: 1954–55
- Champions: Abacá
- All statistics correct as of 20 March 1955.

The 1954–55 Honduran Amateur League was the eighth edition of the Honduran Amateur League. C.D. Abacá obtained its 1st national title. The season ran from 28 February 1954 to 20 March 1955.

== Regional champions ==
Regional championship	Champions
Atlántida	Aduana
Cortés	Sula
Francisco Morazán	Motagua
Yoro	Abacá

=== Known results ===
22 June 1954	Motagua	1–0	Argentina	Tegucigalpa, Francisco Morazán
CST	Rivas			Stadium: Estadio Tiburcio Carías Andino

1954	Motagua	5–1	Olimpia	Tegucigalpa
CST				Stadium: Estadio Tiburcio Carías Andino

1954	Federal	3–2	Colón
CST

1954	Motagua	2–0	Argentina
CST

1954	Colón	4–2	Olimpia
CST

1954	Federal	3–0	Olimpia
CST

1954	Federal	3–0	Argentina
CST

1954	Colón	2–1	Federal
CST

1954	Olimpia	3–5	Federal
CST

1954	Motagua	1–1	Olimpia	Tegucigalpa
CST				Stadium: Estadio Tiburcio Carías Andino

1954	Federal	1–3	Argentina
CST

1954	Motagua	1–1	Federal
CST

1954	Argentina	4–2	Olimpia
CST

22 August 1954 Relegation	Olimpia	1–4	Troya
CST

29 August 1954 Relegation	Olimpia	1–1	Troya
CST

5 September 1954 Relegation	Olimpia	3–3	Troya
CST

== National championship round ==
Played in a double round-robin format between the regional champions. Also known as the Cuadrangular.

Pos	Team	Pts
1	Abacá	10
2	Aduana	8
3	Sula	6
4	Motagua	2

=== Results ===
20 March 1955	Abacá	2–1	Aduana	Tegucigalpa
CST	Umaña			Stadium: Estadio Tiburcio Carías Andino

	Abacá	2–0	Sula	Tegucigalpa
CST				Stadium: Estadio Tiburcio Carías Andino

	Motagua	3–2	Abacá	Tegucigalpa
CST				Stadium: Estadio Tiburcio Carías Andino

	Sula	2–0	Motagua	Tegucigalpa
CST				Stadium: Estadio Tiburcio Carías Andino

	Aduana	0–0	Abacá	Tegucigalpa
CST				Stadium: Estadio Tiburcio Carías Andino

	Aduana	0–2	Sula	Tegucigalpa
CST				Stadium: Estadio Tiburcio Carías Andino

	Aduana	1–0	Motagua	Tegucigalpa
CST				Stadium: Estadio Tiburcio Carías Andino

	Abacá	1–0	Sula	Tegucigalpa
CST				Stadium: Estadio Tiburcio Carías Andino

	Abacá	2–1	Motagua	Tegucigalpa
CST				Stadium: Estadio Tiburcio Carías Andino

	Aduana	2–0	Sula	Tegucigalpa
CST				Stadium: Estadio Tiburcio Carías Andino

	Motagua	1–2	Sula	Tegucigalpa
CST				Stadium: Estadio Tiburcio Carías Andino

== Abacá's lineup ==
- Jerónimo Güití
- Óscar Padilla
- Wilfredo García
- Arnoldo Rivera
- Guillermo Durán
- Trinidad Godoy
- Ernesto Umaña
- Eduardo Gómez
- Esteban Mejía
- Miguel Rodríguez
- Adán Banegas
- Ramón Matute
- Juan Mayorga
- Jorge Cadet
- Arnulfo Reyes
- Luis Escobar
- Víctor Banegas
- Humberto Zúñiga
- Aníbal Torres
- Francisco Medina
