= 1962 Honduran Amateur League =

Amateur League
- Season: 1962
- Champions: Vida
- All statistics correct as of 26 March 2011.

The 1962 Honduran football season was the fifteenth edition of the Honduran Amateur League, won by C.D.S. Vida, after defeating Salamar from San Lorenzo in a final match played in Tegucigalpa.

== Regional champions ==
| Regional championship | Champions |
|---|---|
| Atlántida | Vida |
| Choluteca | Millonarios |
| Cortés | Platense |
| Francisco Morazán | Federal |
| Valle | Salamar |
| Yoro | Yoro |

=== Known results ===
| 1962 | Olimpia | 1–1 | Motagua | Tegucigalpa, Francisco Morazán |
| CST | Suazo | | Castillo | Stadium: Estadio Tiburcio Carías Andino |

| 1962 | Olimpia | Suspended | Motagua | Tegucigalpa, Francisco Morazán |
| CST | | | | Stadium: Estadio Tiburcio Carías Andino; Referee: Antonio Muñoz |

| 1962 Extra match | Olimpia | Cancelled | Federal | Tegucigalpa, Francisco Morazán |
| CST | | | | Stadium: Estadio Tiburcio Carías Andino |

== Second round ==
Played in two sub-groups of three teams each between the regional champions where the winners advanced to the Final.

North group
| Pos | Team | Pld | W | D | L | GF | GA | GD | Pts |
|---|---|---|---|---|---|---|---|---|---|
| 1 | Vida | 0 | 0 | 0 | 0 | 0 | 0 | 0 | 0 |
| 2 | Platense | 0 | 0 | 0 | 0 | 0 | 0 | 0 | 0 |
| 3 | Yoro | 0 | 0 | 0 | 0 | 0 | 0 | 0 | 0 |

South group
| Pos | Team | Pld | W | D | L | GF | GA | GD | Pts |
|---|---|---|---|---|---|---|---|---|---|
| 1 | Salamar | 0 | 0 | 0 | 0 | 0 | 0 | 0 | 0 |
| 2 | Federal | 0 | 0 | 0 | 0 | 0 | 0 | 0 | 0 |
| 3 | Millonarios | 0 | 0 | 0 | 0 | 0 | 0 | 0 | 0 |

=== Known results ===
| 18 November 1962 | Federal | 3–4 | Salamar | Tegucigalpa, Francisco Morazán |
| CST | | | | Stadium: Estadio Tiburcio Carías Andino |

== Final ==
| 1962 | Salamar | 2–3 | Vida | Tegucigalpa, Francisco Morazán |
| CST | | | | Stadium: Estadio Tiburcio Carías Andino |

| 10 December 1962 | Vida | 4–0 | Salamar | La Ceiba, Atlántida |
| CST | | | | Stadium: Estadio Nilmo Edwards |

== Vida's lineup ==
- Pablo Arzú
- Israel Juárez
- Salvador Hernández
- Rogelio López
- Alemán
- Pedro Canales
- Carlos Hernández
- Nilmo Edwards
- Jesús Blanco
- Kiro Brooks
- Alonso Gallegos
- Aristides Maradiaga
- Heriberto Gutiérrez
- Mario Lamelas
- Alberto Amaya
- Cristóbal Brooks
