= 1947 Honduran Amateur League =

Amateur League
- Season: 1947
- Dates: 6 July–5 October 1947
- Champions: Victoria
- All statistics correct as of 26 March 2011.

The 1947 Honduran football season was the first edition of the Amateur League, won by C.D. Victoria, after winning the championship round against F.C. Motagua and C.D. Marathón. Victoria was managed by Francisco Detari and some of the club's famous players at that time were Héctor Briza, Julián Fiallos, Mario Artica, Félix Chimilio and Leonardo Godoy. The trophy was known as the Winston Churchill Cup and was delivered by British Prime Minister Rees John Sowler.

== Regional champions ==
Regional championship	Champions
Atlántida	Victoria
Cortés	Marathón
Francisco Morazán	Motagua

=== Known results ===
July or August 1947	Motagua	4–3	Olimpia	Tegucigalpa, Francisco Morazán
CST

	Motagua	3–2	Argentina
CST

	Olimpia	0–0	Tejeros del España
CST

	Nueva Era	2–1	Federal
CST

	Motagua	3–1	Distrito Central
CST

	Argentina	8–4	Distrito Central
CST

	Tejeros del España	1–0	Nueva Era
CST

	Tejeros del España	4–2	Federal
CST

	Motagua	2–2	Federal
CST

	Nueva Era	2–2	Distrito Central
CST

	Argentina	4–2	Olimpia
CST

== National championship round ==
Played in a double round-robin format between the regional champions. Also known as the Triangular.

Pos	Team	Pld	W	D	L	GF	GA	GD	Pts
1	Victoria	4	3	0	1	9	8	+1	6
2	Motagua	0	0	0	0	0	0	0	0
3	Marathón	0	0	0	0	0	0	0	0

=== Known results ===
1947	Motagua	1–2	Victoria
CST

1947	Motagua	2–0	Victoria
CST

1947	Victoria	2–1	Marathón
CST

1947	Victoria	5–4	Marathón
CST

== Victoria's lineup ==
- Héctor Baiza
- Leonidas Ruiz
- Félix Chimilio
- Manuel Vega
- Julián Fiallos
- James Sticker
- Óscar Johnson
- Rich James
- José Castro
- Salomón Cáceres
- Antonio Fiallos
- Abraham Benedit
- Maximiliano García
- Leonardo Godoy
- Ernesto Castillo
- Carlos Sosa
- Felipe Valencia
- Edgardo Galindo
- Cirilo Everet
- Rolando Soto
