= 1955–56 Honduran Amateur League =

Honduran Amateur League
- Season: 1955–56
- Champions: Hibueras
- All statistics correct as of 12 December 1956.

The 1955–56 Honduran Amateur League was the ninth edition of the Honduran Amateur League. C.D. Hibueras obtained its 2nd national title. The season ran from 16 October 1955 to 12 December 1956.

== Regional champions ==
For the first time the departments of Colón and Comayagua included a team to participate in the national championship.

Regional championship	Champions
Atlántida	Huracán
Colón	Fortuna
Comayagua	Hispano
Cortés	Hibueras
Francisco Morazán	Olimpia
Yoro	Abacá

=== Known results ===
	Olimpia	2–1	Motagua	Tegucigalpa, Francisco Morazán
CST	Price; Salomón		Meza	Stadium: Estadio Tiburcio Carías Andino

	Olimpia	2–1	Motagua	Tegucigalpa, Francisco Morazán
CST	Durón; Suazo		Ponce	Stadium: Estadio Tiburcio Carías Andino

== National championship round ==
Played in a double round-robin format between the regional champions. Also known as the Hexagonal.

Pos	Team	Pld	W	D	L	GF	GA	GD	Pts
1	Hibueras	10	7	2	1	0	0	0	16
2	Olimpia	0	0	0	0	0	0	0	0
2	Abacá	0	0	0	0	0	0	0	0
4	Fortuna	0	0	0	0	0	0	0	0
5	Hispano	0	0	0	0	0	0	0	0
6	Huracán	0	0	0	0	0	0	0	0

=== Known results ===
1956	Hibueras	3–1	Olimpia	San Pedro Sula, Cortés
CST				Stadium: Estadio Francisco Morazán

1956	Olimpia	3–0	Hibueras	Tegucigalpa, Francisco Morazán
CST				Stadium: Estadio Tiburcio Carías Andino

== Hibuera's lineup ==
- José Cardona
- Rubén Salmerón
- Julio Martínez
- Cristobal Cárcamo
- Estanislao Ortega
- Luis Reyes
- Hernán Ochoa
- Rubén Reyes
- James Bradford
- Pablo Castro
- Alejandro Hernández
- Armando Guerra
- Pedro Pagoada
- Heriberto Ochoa
- Porfirio Cruz
- Antonio Amaya
- Óscar Galeano
- Julio Pinel
