= 1952 Honduran Amateur League =

Honduran Amateur League
- Season: 1952
- Champions: Aduana
- All statistics correct as of 19 October 1952.

The 1952 Honduran Amateur League was the sixth edition of the Honduran Amateur League. Club Aduana Deportivo obtained its 1st national title. The season ran from 6 April to 19 October 1952.

== Regional champions ==
For the first time the department of Choluteca included a team to participate in the national championship.

Regional championship	Champions
Atlántida	Aduana
Choluteca	América
Cortés	Hibueras
Francisco Morazán	Federal
Yoro	Abacá

=== Known results ===
1952	Olimpia	1–0	Motagua	Tegucigalpa
CST	Rodríguez			Stadium: Estadio Tiburcio Carías Andino

1952	Olimpia	1–1	Motagua	Tegucigalpa
CST	Batres		Valladares	Stadium: Estadio Tiburcio Carías Andino

1952	Federal	1–0	Olimpia	Tegucigalpa
CST				Stadium: Estadio Tiburcio Carías Andino

1952	Federal	1–1	Olimpia	Tegucigalpa
CST				Stadium: Estadio Tiburcio Carías Andino

1952	Federal	0–1	Motagua	Tegucigalpa
CST				Stadium: Estadio Tiburcio Carías Andino

August 1952	Federal	3–0	Motagua	Tegucigalpa
CST				Stadium: Estadio Tiburcio Carías Andino

== National championship round ==
Played in a single round-robin format between the regional champions. Also known as the Pentagonal.

Pos	Team	Pts
1	Aduana	7
2	Federal	6
3	Hibueras	5
4	Abacá	2
5	América	0

=== Known results ===
19 October 1952	Aduana	1–1	Hibueras
CST	Leaky

1952	Aduana	4–2	Federal	San Pedro Sula, Cortés
CST				Stadium: Estadio Francisco Morazán

== Aduana's lineup ==
- Arnaldo Mora
- Eloy Page
- Napoleón Hidalgo
- Raúl Graugnard
- Clive Garbutt
- Rigoberto Castro
- Armando Doblado
- Salvador Martínez
- Minor Jiménez
- Gladstone Grant
- Rey Zelaya
- Ronald Leaky
- Zito Ellis
- Ñel Vega
- Federico Betancourth
- Roberto Bermúdez
- Juan Rodríguez
