= 1951–52 Honduran Amateur League =

Honduran Amateur League
- Season: 1951–52
- Champions: Sula
- All statistics correct as of 30 March 1952.

The 1951-52 Honduran Amateur League was the fifth edition of the Honduran Amateur League, Sula de La Lima defeated F.C. Motagua 4–3 in the final match played in San Pedro Sula. The season ran from 2 September 1951 to 30 March 1952.

== Regional champions ==
For the first time the department of Valle included a team to participate in the national championship.

Regional championship	Champions
Atlántida	Tela Deportivo
Cortés	Sula
Francisco Morazán	Motagua
Valle	Libertad
Yoro	Mercaderías

=== Known results ===
30 September 1951	Motagua	3–0	Olimpia	Tegucigalpa, Francisco Morazán
CST				Stadium: Estadio Tiburcio Carías Andino

15 November 1951	Motagua	0–0	Olimpia	Tegucigalpa, Francisco Morazán
CST				Stadium: Estadio Tiburcio Carías Andino

11 December 1951	Motagua	3–1	Tejeros del España	Tegucigalpa
CST	González; Godoy		Benedith

== National championship round ==
Played in a double round-robin format between the regional champions. Also known as the Pentagonal.

Pos	Team	Pld	W	D	L	GF	GA	GD	Pts
1	Sula	0	0	0	0	0	0	0	0
2	Motagua	0	0	0	0	0	0	0	0
3	Libertad	0	0	0	0	0	0	0	0
4	Mercaderías	0	0	0	0	0	0	0	0
5	Tela Deportivo	0	0	0	0	0	0	0	0

=== Known results ===
30 March 1952	Sula	4–3	Motagua	San Pedro Sula
CST

March 1952	Motagua	2–3	Sula	Tegucigalpa
CST				Stadium: Estadio Tiburcio Carías Andino

== Sula's lineup ==
- Eduardo Amaya
- Lorenza Cruz
- Gilberto Mendoza
- Luis Reyes
- José Mejia
- Maximiliano García
- Napoleón Deras
- Arturo Rodríguez
- Porfirio Betancourth
- Matias Galindo
- Tomás Casco
- Constantino Bandy
- Miguel Ruiz
- José López
- Fernando Coto
- Héctor Arias
- Marco Vásquez
- Felipe Bandy
- Orlando Cea
- Óscar Crespo
