= 1950–51 Honduran Amateur League =

Honduran Amateur League
- Season: 1950–51
- Champions: Motagua
- All statistics correct as of 23 January 1951.

The 1950–51 Honduran Amateur League was the fourth edition of the Honduran Amateur League. F.C. Motagua obtained its 2nd national title. The season ran from 9 September 1950 to 23 January 1951.

== Regional champions ==
For the first time the department of Yoro included a team to participate for the national championship.

Regional championship	Champions
Atlántida	Aduana
Cortés	Sula
Francisco Morazán	Motagua
Yoro	Comandancia

=== Known results ===
20 August 1950	Motagua	4–1	Olimpia	Tegucigalpa
CST				Stadium: Estadio Tiburcio Carías Andino

26 November 1950	Motagua	3–2	Olimpia	Tegucigalpa
CST				Stadium: Estadio Tiburcio Carías Andino

6 January 1951	Motagua	2–0	Federal	Tegucigalpa
CST	Castro			Stadium: Estadio Tiburcio Carías Andino

	Motagua	2–0	Federal	Tegucigalpa
CST				Stadium: Estadio Tiburcio Carías Andino

	Motagua	2–0	España	Tegucigalpa
CST				Stadium: Estadio Tiburcio Carías Andino

	Motagua	3–2	España	Tegucigalpa
CST				Stadium: Estadio Tiburcio Carías Andino

	Motagua	4–1	Nueva Era	Tegucigalpa
CST				Stadium: Estadio Tiburcio Carías Andino

	Motagua	4–0	Nueva Era	Tegucigalpa
CST				Stadium: Estadio Tiburcio Carías Andino

	Motagua	6–2	Distrito Central	Tegucigalpa
CST				Stadium: Estadio Tiburcio Carías Andino

	Motagua	2–1	Distrito Central	Tegucigalpa
CST				Stadium: Estadio Tiburcio Carías Andino

	Motagua	3–1	Argentina	Tegucigalpa
CST				Stadium: Estadio Tiburcio Carías Andino

	Motagua	2–0	Esfuerzo Deportivo	Tegucigalpa
CST				Stadium: Estadio Tiburcio Carías Andino

	Motagua	Cancelled	Argentina	Tegucigalpa
CST				Stadium: Estadio Tiburcio Carías Andino

	Motagua	Cancelled	Esfuerzo Deportivo	Tegucigalpa
CST				Stadium: Estadio Tiburcio Carías Andino

== National championship round ==
Played in a single round-robin format in Tegucigalpa between the regional champions. Also known as the Cuadrangular.

Pos	Team	Pld	W	D	L	GF	GA	GD	Pts
1	Motagua	3	3	0	0	7	5	+2	6
2	Aduana	0	0	0	0	0	0	0	0
3	Comandancia	0	0	0	0	0	0	0	0
4	Sula	0	0	0	0	0	0	0	0

=== Known results ===
	Motagua	2–1	Comandancia	Tegucigalpa
CST	Barahona 65'; Castro 75'			Stadium: Estadio Tiburcio Carías Andino

	Motagua	5–4	Aduana	Tegucigalpa
CST	Castro			Stadium: Estadio Tiburcio Carías Andino

23 January 1951	Motagua	forfeit	Sula	Tegucigalpa
CST				Stadium: Estadio Tiburcio Carías Andino; Referee: Valentín Bonilla
Note: Match awarded to Motagua as Sula abandoned the match at 35' for not accepting a red card.

== Motagua's lineup ==
- Alberto Quan
- Víctor Bernárdez
- Emilio Sosa
- Alfonso Uclés
- Ramiro Godoy
- Adolfo Castro
- Zacarías Arzú
- Amado Baños
- Chico Alegría
- Raúl Barahona
- Rigoberto Castro
- Secundino Valladares
- Óscar Gómez
- Alberto Bourdeth
- Roberto Girón
- Michel Fúnez
- Ramiro Godoy
- Manuel Sosa
- Julio Barahona
- Mario Laínez
- Alonso Laitano
- Arturo Amador
- Luís Doblado
- Rodolfo Godoy
