= 1949 Honduran Amateur League =

Honduran Amateur League
- Season: 1949
- Champions: Hibueras
- All statistics correct as of 30 October 1949.

The 1949 Honduran Amateur League was the third edition of the Honduran Amateur League. C.D. Hibueras obtained its 1st national title. The season ran from 10 April to 30 October 1949.

== Regional champions ==
Regional championship	Champions
Atlántida	Victoria
Cortés	Hibueras
Francisco Morazán	Olimpia

=== Known results ===
1949	Olimpia	2–0	Motagua	Tegucigalpa, Francisco Morazán
CST				Stadium: Estadio Tiburcio Carías Andino

== National championship round ==
Played in a single round-robin format in Tegucigalpa between the regional champions. Also known as the Triangular.

Pos	Team	Pld	W	D	L	GF	GA	GD	Pts
1	Hibueras	2	2	0	0	4	1	+3	4
2	Olimpia	2	1	0	1	2	2	0	2
3	Victoria	2	0	0	2	2	5	−3	0

=== Results ===
October 1949	Olimpia	2–1	Victoria	Tegucigalpa, Francisco Morazán
CST				Stadium: Estadio Tiburcio Carías Andino

October 1949	Olimpia	0–1	Hibueras	Tegucigalpa, Francisco Morazán
CST				Stadium: Estadio Tiburcio Carías Andino

October 1949	Hibueras	3–1	Victoria	Tegucigalpa, Francisco Morazán
CST				Stadium: Estadio Tiburcio Carías Andino

== Hibueras's lineup ==
- César Portillo
- Miguel Ruiz
- Charles Christy
- Manuel Larios
- Enrique García
- Luis López
- José Rodríguez
- Alejandro Hernández
- Erick Wetsbi
- Jorge Monteneau (ROU)
- Eduardo Cabalceta (CRC)
- Ciano García
- Arturo Rodríguez
- Narciso Hernández
- Agua de soda Reyes
- Héctor Arias
- José Trigueros
- Pedro Ruiz
- Quintín Máximo
- Antonio Rodríguez
- Canario Núñez
- José López
- Constantino Bandy
- Pillen Sánchez
- Porfirio Betancourth
- Adolfo Castro
- Eduardo Amaya
- Julio Martínez
- Gilberto Mendoza
- Porfirio Cruz
