= 1948 Honduran Amateur League =

Honduran Amateur League
- Season: 1948
- Champions: Motagua
- All statistics correct as of 26 October 1948.

The 1948 Honduran Amateur League was the second edition of the Honduran Amateur League. F.C. Motagua obtained its 1st national title. The season ran from 11 July to 26 October 1948.

== Regional champions ==
Regional championship	Champions
Atlántida	Atlántida
Cortés	Hércules
Francisco Morazán	Motagua

=== Known results ===
1948	Motagua	6–3	Olimpia	Tegucigalpa, Francisco Morazán
CST				Stadium: Estadio Tiburcio Carías Andino

== National championship round ==
Played in a single round-robin format between the regional champions and current champions C.D. Victoria. Also known as the Cuadrangular. The game between F.C. Motagua and Victoria played at Estadio Tiburcio Carías Andino became the first and only game as of today in Honduran football history that had three 15 minutes extra times. This happened in the very last match of the final round which Victoria won 3–2, a score that resulted in both teams finishing with 4 points each. After 135 minutes of exhausting play, the game remained tied and the title undecided. This forced the decision to play a rematch which ended in a 2–2 draw, forcing yet another rematch which was finally won by Motagua.

Pos	Team	Pld	W	D	L	GF	GA	GD	Pts
1	Motagua	3	2	0	1	11	5	+6	4
2	Victoria	3	2	0	1	8	7	+1	4
3	Atlántida	0	0	0	0	0	0	0	0
4	Hércules	0	0	0	0	0	0	0	0

=== Known results ===
14 September 1948	Motagua	5–1	Hércules	Tegucigalpa
13:00 CST				Stadium: Estadio Tiburcio Carías Andino

14 September 1948	Victoria	0–2	Atlántida	Tegucigalpa
CST				Stadium: Estadio Tiburcio Carías Andino

15 September 1948	Motagua	4–1	Atlántida	Tegucigalpa
CST				Stadium: Estadio Tiburcio Carías Andino

15 September 1948	Victoria	5–3	Hércules	Tegucigalpa
CST				Stadium: Estadio Tiburcio Carías Andino

19 September 1948	Motagua	4–5 (a.e.t.)	Victoria	Tegucigalpa
CST			Castillo	Stadium: Estadio Tiburcio Carías Andino

24 October 1948 Extra match	Motagua	2–2	Victoria	Tegucigalpa
CST	Castro		Castillo; Benedith	Stadium: Estadio Tiburcio Carías Andino; Attendance: 10,000+ Referee: Ricardo Méndez (SLV)

26 October 1948 Extra match II	Motagua	3–2	Victoria	Tegucigalpa
CST	Castro; Palencia		(o.g.) Navarro	Stadium: Estadio Tiburcio Carías Andino

== Motagua's lineup ==
- Conrado Navarro
- Alonso Laitano
- Enrique Miselem
- Juan Andino
- Ramiro Godoy
- Concepción Carbajal
- Michel Fúnez
- Roberto Girón
- Trinidad Palencia
- Raúl Barahona
- Rigoberto Castro
- Zacarías Arzú
- Alfredo Dacaret
- Julio Barahona
- Carlos Silva
- Napoleón Castellanos
- Elías Hilsaca
- Alberto Bourdeth
- Alfonso Uclés
- Secundino Valladares
- Carlos Noren
- Daniel Matamoros
- Esteban Varela
