= 1953 Honduran Amateur League =

Honduran Amateur League
- Season: 1953
- Champions: Federal
- All statistics correct as of 27 September 1953.

The 1953 Honduran Amateur League was the seventh edition of the Honduran Amateur League of association football. C.D. Federal obtained its 1st national title. The season ran from 3 May to 27 September 1953.

== Regional champions ==
Regional championship	Champions
Atlántida	Aduana
Cortés	Hibueras
Francisco Morazán	Federal
Yoro	Cuba

=== Known results ===
24 May 1953	Olimpia	2–1	Motagua	Tegucigalpa, Francisco Morazán
CST				Stadium: Estadio Tiburcio Carías Andino

10 June 1953	Olimpia	0–1	Federal	Tegucigalpa, Francisco Morazán
CST				Stadium: Estadio Tiburcio Carías Andino

== National championship round ==
Played in a double round-robin format between the regional champions. Also known as the Cuadrangular.

Pos	Team	Pld	W	D	L	GF	GA	GD	Pts
1	Federal	0	0	0	0	0	0	0	0
2	Aduana	0	0	0	0	0	0	0	0
3	Hibueras	0	0	0	0	0	0	0	0
4	Cuba	0	0	0	0	0	0	0	0

=== Known results ===
27 September 1953	Federal	3–1	Aduana	Tegucigalpa, Francisco Morazán
CST	Iglesias			Stadium: Estadio Tiburcio Carías Andino

== Federal's lineup ==
- Efraín Salinas
- Fernando Brenes
- Miguel Márquez
- Orlando Vásquez
- Carlos Rivera
- Héctor Pacheco
- Jorge Iglesias
- Carlos Umanzor
- Mario Rivas
- Jacobo Godoy
- Pedro Velásquez
- Andrés Salinas
- Marcos López
- Alberto Miranda
- Ismael Zelaya
- Víctor Vásquez
- Agustín Aguilar
