= Honduran Amateur League =

- First season: 1947
- Folded: 1964
- Country: Honduras
- Divisions: 1
- Most championships: Olimpia (7)

The Honduran Amateur League (Liga Amateur de Honduras in Spanish) was the top-level football league in Honduras from its foundation in 1947 until 1964 when the Liga Nacional was formed.

== Teams ==
- Abacá
- Aduana
- América
- Atlántida
- Chorotega
- Comandancia
- Cuba
- España
- Federal
- Ferrocarril
- Fortuna
- Hércules
- Hibueras
- Hispano
- Honduras
- Huracán
- Independiente
- Lenca
- Libertad
- Marathón
- Mercaderías
- Millonarios
- Motagua
- Olimpia
- Palermo
- Platense
- Salamar
- Sula
- Tela Deportivo
- Tigre
- Victoria
- Vida
- Yoro

== Champions ==
| Season | Champion | Runners-up |
|---|---|---|
| 1947 | Victoria | Motagua |
| 1948 | Motagua | Victoria |
| 1949 | Hibueras | Olimpia |
| 1950–51 | Motagua | Sula |
| 1951–52 | Sula | Motagua |
| 1952 | Aduana | Federal |
| 1953 | Federal | Aduana |
| 1954–55 | Abacá | Aduana |
| 1955–56 | Hibueras | Olimpia |
| 1957–58 | Olimpia | Hibueras |
| 1958–59 | Olimpia | Independiente |
| 1959 | Olimpia | Marathón |
| 1960–61 | Olimpia | España |
| 1961 | Olimpia | Independiente |
| 1962 | Vida | Salamar |
| 1963–64 | Olimpia | España |
| 1964 | Olimpia | Platense |

== Titles by club ==
| Club | Titles | Winning years |
|---|---|---|
| Olimpia | 7 | 1957–58, 1958–59, 1959, 1960–61, 1961, 1963–64, 1964 |
| Motagua | 2 | 1948, 1950–51 |
| Hibueras | 2 | 1949, 1955–56 |
| Victoria | 1 | 1947 |
| Sula | 1 | 1951–52 |
| Aduana | 1 | 1952 |
| Federal | 1 | 1953 |
| Abacá | 1 | 1954–55 |
| Vida | 1 | 1962 |
| Totals | 17 | — |

== See also ==
- Liga Nacional de Fútbol Profesional de Honduras
- Francisco Morazán Major League
