= Raúl Suazo =

Honduran footballer (born 1944)

Personal information
- Full name: José Raúl Suazo Lagos
- Date of birth: 19 September 1944 (age 82)
- Place of birth: La Lima, Cortés, Honduras
- Position: Midfielder

Youth career
- 1960–1962: Olimpia

Senior career*
Years	Team	Apps	(Gls)
1962–1974	Olimpia		

International career
1963–1967	Honduras		
- * Club domestic league appearances and goals

José Raúl Suazo Lagos (born 19 September 1944) is a retired Honduran footballer. He played for Olimpia throughout the 1960s and the early 1970s, winning many titles with the club. He also represented Honduras for the 1963 and 1967 CONCACAF Championships.

== Club career ==
Raúl was born on 19 September 1944 as the younger brother of fellow footballers René and Carlos who were both born in Tela. He began his senior career with Olimpia within the 1962 Honduran Amateur League after spending the previous two years within their youth sector. The following 1963–64 Honduran Amateur League saw Suazo achieve his first title with the club as he played alongside his older brother Calistrín. This success continued once Honduras entered an era of professionalized domestic football as he was part of the winning squads for the 1966–67, 1967–68, 1969–70 and 1971–72 Honduran Liga Nacional. He was also part of the squad that won the 1972 CONCACAF Champions' Cup as well as participating in the 1973 Copa Interamericana.

== International career ==
Suazo made his debut for Honduras during the 1963 CONCACAF Championship as a substitute player and played alongside his older brother Carlos. He then participated in the 1966 FIFA World Cup qualifiers that saw Honduras in the same group as Mexico and the United States with Mexico ultimately qualifying. He spent his final international season within the 1967 CONCACAF Championship.
