= 1967–68 Honduran Segunda División =

Honduran Segunda División
- Season: 1967–68
- Champions: Victoria
- Promoted: Victoria
- All statistics correct as of 10 March 1968.

The 1967–68 Honduran Segunda División was the second season of the Honduran Segunda División. Under the management of Víctor Bernárdez, C.D. Victoria won the tournament after defeating C.D. Federal in the final series and obtained promotion to the 1968–69 Honduran Liga Nacional.

== Final ==
1968 1st leg	Victoria	5–3	Federal	La Ceiba, Atlántida
				Stadium: Estadio Nilmo Edwards

10 March 1968 2nd leg	Federal	2–3	Victoria	Tegucigalpa, Francisco Morazán
				Stadium: Estadio Tiburcio Carías Andino

- Victoria won 8–5 on aggregate.
