= Mario Caballero =

Honduran footballer (born 1944)

Personal information
- Full name: Mario Felipe Caballero Arévalo
- Date of birth: 23 August 1943
- Place of birth: Cofradía, Cortés, Honduras
- Date of death: 23 August 2019 (aged 76)
- Place of death: San Pedro Sula, Cortés, Honduras
- Position: Forward

Senior career*
Years	Team	Apps	(Gls)
1958–1974	Marathón		

International career
1964–1967	Honduras		
- * Club domestic league appearances and goals

Mario Felipe Caballero Arévalo (23 August 1943 – 23 August 2019) was a Honduran footballer. Nicknamed "Cofra", he played as a midfielder for Marathón throughout the 1960s and the early 1970s. He also represented Honduras internationally for the 1967 CONCACAF Championship.

== Club career ==
Born on 23 August 1943, Caballero was given the nicknamed of "Cofra" as it was a nickname given from his home city of Cofradía, making his debut for Marathón during the 1958–59 Honduran Amateur League. Throughout his career, he would form the main offensive composition of the club alongside his teammates Julio Fonesca and his brother Mauro Caballero as he was the top scorer in the final seasons of amateur Honduran football. He would continue his career into the Honduran footballing league entering professionalization. He retired following the 1973–74 Honduran Liga Nacional due to an injury that left him unable to play any longer. His final goal for the club occurred on 6 September 1970

== International career ==
Caballero was first called up to represent Honduras for the 1965 CONCACAF Championship qualifiers as well as the 1966 FIFA World Cup qualifiers. He would make his official tournament debut during the following 1967 CONCACAF Championship where the team achieved 3rd place.

== Personal life ==
Caballero died on 23 August 2019 at San Pedro Sula.
