= 1969–70 Honduran Segunda División =

Honduran Segunda División
- Season: 1969–70
- Champions: Verdún
- Promoted: Verdún
- All statistics correct as of 7 June 1970.

The 1969–70 Honduran Segunda División was the fourth season of the Honduran Segunda División. Under the management of Alfonso Uclés, C.D. Verdún won the tournament after defeating San Pedro in the final series and obtained promotion to the 1970–71 Honduran Liga Nacional.

== Final ==
1970 1st leg	San Pedro	2–3	Verdún

7 June 1970 2nd leg	Verdún	2–0	San Pedro	Tegucigalpa, Francisco Morazán
				Stadium: Estadio Tiburcio Carías Andino

- Verdún won 5–2 on aggregate.
