= Crisanto Norales =

Honduran footballer (born 1938)

Personal information
- Full name: Roberto Crisanto Norales
- Date of birth: 1 December 1937 (age 88)
- Place of birth: Honduras
- Position: Goalkeeper

Senior career*
Years	Team	Apps	(Gls)
1960–1972	Olimpia		

International career
1965–1967	Honduras	4+	(0)

Managerial career
- 1969: Olimpia (player-manager)
- * Club domestic league appearances and goals

Roberto Crisanto Norales (born 1 December 1937) is a Honduran former footballer who played as a goalkeeper.

== Career ==
He spent his whole career at Olimpia, where he won four Liga Nacional de Fútbol de Honduras titles, as well as the 1972 CONCACAF Champions' Cup. Additionally, he was awarded the Liga Nacional's best goalkeeper for four seasons in a row between 1967 and 1970. In 1969, he also served briefly as a player-manager for Olimpia. While playing, he gained the nickname 'Manga', after the Brazilian goalkeeper.

In 1965, he made three appearances for the Honduras national team in the first round of 1966 FIFA World Cup qualification. Two years later, he was called up for the 1967 CONCACAF Championship, where they finished third.

In July 2023, Deportes TVC ranked Norales the ninth best Honduran goalkeeper of all time.
