= C.D. Atlántida =

- Full name: Club Deportivo Atlántida
- Founded: 1927
- Ground: Estadio Nilmo Edwards; La Ceiba, Honduras
- Capacity: 18,000
- League: Honduran Liga Mayor
Home colours	Away colours

Club Deportivo Atlántida is a Honduran soccer club based on La Ceiba, Honduras, founded in 1927.

The club currently plays in the Honduran third division.

== History ==
In 1964, a triangular tournament was organized between three clubs from the Liga Dionisio de Herrera between Vida, Victoria and Atlántida; having Vida qualified for the first season of Honduran professional football.

== Achievements ==
- Segunda División

Winners (1): 1974

- Atlántida Championship

Winners (1): 1948

== League performance ==
Regular season										Post season								
Season	Pos	Pld	W	D	L	F	A	GD	Pts	Pos	Pld	W	D	L	F	A	GD	Pts
1975–76	10th	27	3	5	19	12	48	−36	11	Did not enter								

== Squad ==
Note: Flags indicate national team as defined under FIFA eligibility rules; some limited exceptions apply. Players may hold more than one non-FIFA nationality.

No.	Pos.	Nation	Player
—	GK	HON	Florencio Jorge Sánchez
—	GK	HON	Diego Pérez
—	DF	HON	Catalino Rodríguez
—	DF	HON	Jorge Del Cid
—	DF	HON	Osvald Díaz
—	DF	HON	Facundo Mateos
—	DF	HON	Antonio Bertoglio
—	DF	HON	Miguel Fajardo
—	DF	HON	Sergio Adán
—	DF	HON	Max Argueta
—	MF	HON	Tony Cerrato
—	MF	HON	Carlos Valentín

No.	Pos.	Nation	Player
—	MF	HON	Tavo Ardilla
—	MF	HON	Conán Argueta
—	MF	HON	Juan Fernando Sánchez
—	MF	HON	Andrés Suárez
—	MF	HON	Carlos León
—	MF	HON	Enrique Fajardo
—	MF	HON	Pedro Rodríguez
—	MF	HON	Sergio Javito
—	FW	HON	Roberto Melara
—	FW	HON	Carlos Roberto Sánchez
—	FW	HON	David Ramos
—	FW	HON	Juan García

== See also ==
- Football in Honduras
