= C.D. La Salle =

Club Deportivo La Salle ó Club Deportivo San Pedro
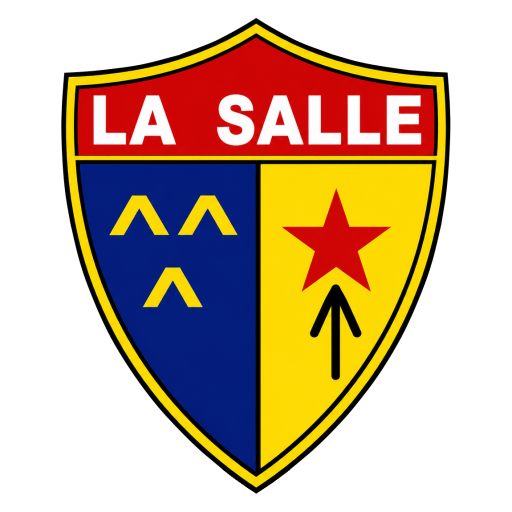
- Full name: Club Deportivo La Salle ó Club Deportivo San Pedro
- Ground: Estadio Francisco Morazán; San Pedro Sula, Honduras
- Capacity: 20,000
Home colours	Away colours

Club Deportivo La Salle ó Club Deportivo San Pedro was a Honduran football club.

== History ==
Club Deportivo La Salle was a football club that played in the Honduran National League between 1965 and 1968. The club was based in San Pedro Sula, Cortés, and played home matches at the Estadio General Francisco Morazán.

The club's top scorer was Enrique "Quique" Grey Fúnez. He appeared for La Salle in the inaugural 1965–66 season of the Liga Nacional, scoring his first goal on 15 August 1965. He finished the season as the league's first-ever top scorer with 14 goals and continued to score for the club until the 1968–69 season, when he joined Marathón. The club changed its name from Club La Salle to Club San Pedro in 1966.

== Players ==
- (Honduras) Víctor Henderson
- (Honduras) Leonardo "Guembo" Vásquez
- (Honduras) Víctor Castro
- (Honduras) Enrique "Quique" Grey Fúnez
- (Honduras) Mario "Bulla" Tróchez
- (Honduras) Salvador Azcúnaga
- (Honduras) Adalberto "Chino" Menjívar
- (Honduras) Héctor Castro
- (Honduras) Román Hernández
- (Honduras) Luis Alonso Metzgen
- (Honduras) Israel "Gato" Juárez
- (Honduras) Getulio Millares
- (Honduras) Astor Perdomo
- (Honduras) Carlos "Calín" Cobos
- (Honduras) Ricardo Montalván
- (Honduras) Santiago Rodríguez
- (Honduras) Miguel "Pelo" Pavón
- (Honduras) Rolando Portillo

== Achievements ==
- Segunda División

Runners-up (2): 1969–70, 1973

== See also ==
- Football in Honduras
