= Gimnástico F.C. =

Honduran football club

Gimnástico
- Full name: Gimnástico Fútbol Club
- Nickname(s): Los Clavelitos (The Carnations)
- Founded: 9 November 1949; 75 years ago
- Ground: Estadio Emilio Larach, Tegucigalpa
- Capacity: 3,000
- Manager: Juan Flores
- League: Liga de Ascenso
Home colours

Gimnástico F.C. is a Honduran football club located in Tegucigalpa. They currently play in the Liga de Ascenso and they play their home games at Estadio Emilio Larach, located in La Kennedy neighborhood.

== History ==
Gimnástico F.C. was founded in 1949. Although the club have never played in Liga Nacional, they have been around since the amateur era, taking part in the dissolved Francisco Morazán Championship. In 2017, the team made history as they reached the 2017 Honduran Cup final.

== Colours and badge ==
The club wears a red uniform with blue ornaments. The badge consist of a red carnation flower and a football.

== Stadium ==
Gimnástico F.C. plays their home matches at Estadio Emilio Larach in Tegucigalpa. The stadium has a capacity of 3,000 spectators and it has synthetic grass.

== Achievements ==
- Honduran Cup

Runner-up (1): 2017
