= Estadio Nilmo Edwards =

Stadium in La Ceiba, Honduras

Coordinates: 15.786107°N 86.785945°W

- Estadio Ceibeño
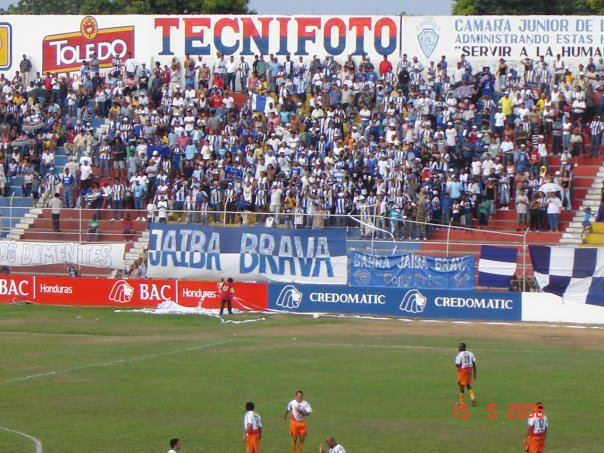
- Interactive map of Estadio Nilmo Edwards
- Full name: Estadio Nilmo Edwards
- Location: La Ceiba, Honduras
- Capacity: 18,000
- Surface: GrassMaster

Construction
- Built: 1956

Tenants
- Victoria; Vida; Atlántida; Honduras national football team; (selected matches)

Estadio Ceibeño is a multi-purpose stadium in La Ceiba, Honduras.

== Overview ==
It is currently used mostly for football matches and is the home stadium of Honduran National league side Victoria and as well as for second tier Atlántida and Vida. The Honduras national football team has used Estadio Ceibeño as its home stadium. The stadium holds 18,000 people.

It has been used for music concerts on occasion.
