= Humberto Micheletti Stadium =

Estadio Humberto Micheletti
- Interactive map of Estadio Humberto Micheletti
- Location: El Progreso, Yoro; Honduras
- Coordinates: 15°24′02″N 87°48′54″W
- Owner: El Progreso municipality
- Capacity: 5,000

Tenant
- Honduras Progreso (1965–present)

The Estadio Humberto Micheleti is a multi-use stadium in El Progreso, Honduras. It is used mostly for football matches and is the home stadium of C.D. Honduras Progreso.

The stadium was closed in August 2025 for remodeling.
