= C.D.S. Vida =

Association football club in Honduras

Vida
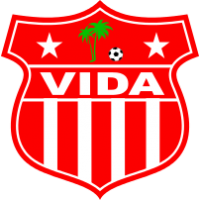
- Full name: Club Deportivo y Social Vida
- Nicknames: Los Cocoteros (The Coconuts); Los Venados (The Deer); Los Rojiblancos (The Red-and-Whites)
- Founded: 14 October 1940; 85 years ago
- Ground: Estadio Nilmo Edwards, La Ceiba, Honduras
- Capacity: 18,000
- Owner: Luis Cruz

Club Deportivo y Social Vida, or simply Vida, is a Honduran professional football club based in La Ceiba, Atlántida. The club last competed in the Liga Nacional de Ascenso, the second tier of Honduran football.

The club won two top-flight domestic league titles and was ultimately folded in 2024 after facing economic problems starting in 2021 and relegation before coming back just a few weeks after it folded.

== History ==
=== Salvavida ===
The club that is today known as Vida was founded on 14 October 1940, as a result of a split in the board of directors of Atlántida. Gregorio Ramos, one of the Atlántida directors, decided to found his own team. Since it was initially sponsored by the brewery Cervecería Hondureña, SA, the club took the name Salvavida, a brand of beer that the brewery produced.

Later on, the relationship between Cervezería Hondureña and Salvavida was coming to an end. According to club legend, the wife of one of the club directors (Vida Code de Castañeda) fell into a river or a lake while the team was walking by. The cry of "un salvavida para vida" (a lifesaver for Vida) went up. This was supposedly the inspiration for the modern name, Vida.

=== 1940s and 1950s ===
During the 1940s, most of the club's players were employees of team president Gregorio Ramos, who was also owner of Lavanderia Ramos. He also was the president of the team and contributed economically and handled the team affairs. The training was carried out in a small field located that was property of the Standard Fruit Company (DOLE). Another source of players were students from the local public school, Instituto Manuel Bonilla and those from the amateur soccer club Deportes Diablos Negros. The most notable stars of these years were the famous Talon Arzú, Alberto "Campion" Amaya, Héctor "Jet" Castillo McKenzie, Quiro Brooks, Cristóbal Craka Brooks, and the Spaniard Rafael "El Fafa" from Navarre.

=== Vida's rise to prominence ===
Vida's breakthrough came in the 1960s, with the energy provided by rising stars such as Salvador Hernández, Nilmo Edwards, and the brothers Morris and Junia Garden. In 1961, Vida finished runners-up in the national tournament, losing out only to Olimpia. They won the whole thing in 1964, beating out Salamar of San Lorenzo in Tegucigalpa.

In 1964, when the previously amateur Honduran league officially turned professional, the city of La Ceiba was offered one place. Vida prevailed in a play-off against two local rivals, Victoria and Atlántida, to earn the city's slot in the new top flight. The previously amateur players were awarded salaries drawn from ticket sales, and the old field where Vida used to play was converted into a genuine stadium, the Estadio Ceibeño. With the stadium built, Vida moved to Campo Vida located in the neighborhood La Isla as their training ground (which is still preserved to this date, and used for youth league teams in La Ceiba).

=== CDS Vida: The glory years (1965–1985) ===
From 1965 to 1975, Vida was a frequent finisher in the Top 4 of the Honduran Major League Soccer. Their best season during this stretch was 1971, when they finished second to Olimpia. Their success continued throughout the 1970s, as they were a regular qualifier for the quadrangular playoff, but it was the early 1980s that saw the club's greatest run of success.

It started in 1981, when Vida finished third in the first phase to qualify for the playoffs. In the quadrangular, they finished level with Motagua at the top of the table, and prevailed 2–0. Then, in the championship against regular season winners Atlético Morazán, Vida triumphed 4–1 on aggregate. They won a second title in 1983, then narrowly finished as runners-up to Olimpia and Marathon in 1984 and 1985.

During the 1980s, the team's notable players were Enrique "Palanca" Mendoza, Matilde Lacayo, Dennis "La Bomba" Hinds, Cipriano Dueños (national scoring Champion in 1986) and Roberto "Macho" Figueroa (a key player in the Honduras National team that earned the berth to the World Cup Spain 1982, sold to Real Murcia after the tournament).

=== Decline and descent into obscurity (1986–2024) ===
Vida's decline began in 1986. The club had finished first in the regular season and third in the quadrangular play-offs; by most accounts a respectable year. However, shortly after the end of the playoffs, the club was rocked by a match-fixing scandal. Specifically, the accusation was that they deliberately threw the title to Olimpia.

Vida never recovered, and it took many years before they even appeared a top-flight challenger. Even after the Apertura and the Clausura were adopted, Vida has struggled. They have not reached a final since their glory days.

=== Relegation (2024–present) ===
On 2024, Vida gets relegated to the Liga De Ascenso for the first time in its history after losing against Lobos UPNFM 3-1 in the Relegation Final.

== Club rivalries ==
=== Clásico Ceibeño ===
El Clásico Ceibeño (La Ceiba derby) is a football match played between Victoria and CDS Vida, both teams from La Ceiba, Honduras.

== Achievements ==
Domestic

- Liga Nacional de Fútbol de Honduras:

Winners (2): 1981–82, 1983–84
Runner-up (3): 1971–72, 1984–85, 1985–86

- Liga Amateur de Honduras:

Winners (1): 1962

== League and play-off performance (1994–present) ==
Season	Position	G	W	D	L	GS	GA	PTS	Playoff	Pl.	W	D	L	GS	GA	PTS
1994–95	7th	27	8	9	10	38	41	33	did not qualify	-	-	-	-	-	-	-
1995–96	8th	27	5	14	8	25	37	29	did not qualify	-	-	-	-	-	-	-
1996–97	8th	27	7	7	13	21	33	28	did not qualify	-	-	-	-	-	-	-
1997–98 Apertura	8th	20	7	2	11	31	33	23	did not qualify	-	-	-	-	-	-	-
1997–98 Clausura	7th	20	5	8	7	26	26	23	did not qualify	-	-	-	-	-	-	-
1999 Apertura	9th	18	4	4	10	22	33	16	did not qualify	-	-	-	-	-	-	-
1999–00 Apertura	6th	18	6	4	8	18	30	22	Quarter-finals	2	0	1	1	3	4	1
1999–00 Clausura	10th	18	3	5	10	18	30	14	did not qualify	-	-	-	-	-	-	-
2000–01 Apertura	6th	18	6	5	7	22	24	23	Quarter-finals	2	0	1	1	1	3	1
2000–01 Clausura	9th	18	4	6	8	22	31	18	did not qualify	-	-	-	-	-	-	-
2001–02 Apertura	6th	18	3	11	4	20	23	20	did not qualify	-	-	-	-	-	-	-
2001–02 Clausura	9th	18	3	10	5	16	21	19	did not qualify	-	-	-	-	-	-	-
2002–03 Apertura	7th	18	4	7	7	19	29	19	did not qualify	-	-	-	-	-	-	-
2002–03 Clausura	5th	18	7	4	7	24	30	25	did not qualify	-	-	-	-	-	-	-
2003–04 Apertura	3rd	18	8	5	5	24	20	29	Semi-finals	2	1	0	1	3	4	3
2003–04 Clausura	9th	16	2	7	7	13	25	13	did not qualify	-	-	-	-	-	-	-
2004–05 Apertura	5th	18	6	4	8	20	23	22	did not qualify	-	-	-	-	-	-	-
2004–05 Clausura	7th	18	5	7	6	16	19	22	did not qualify	-	-	-	-	-	-	-
2005–06 Apertura	9th	18	4	6	8	22	25	18	did not qualify	-	-	-	-	-	-	-
2005–06 Clausura	5th	18	6	9	3	21	21	27	did not qualify	-	-	-	-	-	-	-
2006–07 Apertura	10th	18	3	2	13	17	39	11	did not qualify	-	-	-	-	-	-	-
2006–07 Clausura	6th	18	6	4	8	21	23	22	did not qualify	-	-	-	-	-	-	-
2007–08 Apertura	8th	18	4	8	6	18	22	20	did not qualify	-	-	-	-	-	-	-
2007–08 Clausura	10th	18	4	6	8	18	29	18	did not qualify	-	-	-	-	-	-	-
2008–09 Apertura	10th	18	1	6	11	11	25	9	did not qualify	-	-	-	-	-	-	-
2008–09 Clausura	4th	18	6	8	4	18	19	26	Semi-finals	2	1	0	1	1	2	-1
2009–10 Apertura	7th	18	4	6	8	22	33	18	did not qualify	-	-	-	-	-	-	-
2009–10 Clausura	3rd	18	8	4	6	25	20	28	Semi-finals	2	0	2	0	3	3	2
2010–11 Apertura	6th	18	7	4	7	26	23	25	did not qualify	-	-	-	-	-	-	-
2010–11 Clausura	3rd	18	7	5	6	23	18	26	Semi-finals	2	1	0	1	3	3	3
2011–12 Apertura	4th	18	7	5	6	19	21	26	Semi-finals	4	1	0	3	4	8	3
2011–12 Clausura	6th	18	5	9	4	24	25	24	Quarter-Finals	2	0	1	1	1	2	1
2012–13 Apertura	7th	18	5	6	7	24	35	21	did not qualify	-	-	-	-	-	-	-
2012–13 Clausura	9th	18	4	7	7	17	29	19	did not qualify	-	-	-	-	-	-	-

=== All-time table ===
(From 1965/66 to 2007/08)

Seasons	Points	Played	Won	Drawn	Lost	For	Against	Difference
43	1629	1302	387	468	447	1375	1568	-193

=== Performance (1997–98 – present) ===
Team	Games	Won	Drawn	Lost	Scored	Against	Points	Difference
Real España	44	13	21	10	57	60	60	-4
Platense	42	15	10	17	46	50	55	-4
Universidad	34	14	10	10	38	34	52	+4
Victoria	42	11	14	17	46	71	47	-24
Marathón	42	8	10	24	42	83	34	-41
Motagua	44	5	13	26	34	69	28	-35
Atlético Olanchano	16	7	4	5	28	26	25	+2
Olimpia	44	2	16	26	41	85	22	-44
Real Maya / Patepluma	12	5	4	3	17	15	19	+2
Hispano	12	4	4	4	14	16	16	-2
Broncos	10	3	2	5	16	17	11	-1
Deportes Savio	12	2	5	5	8	15	11	-7
Independiente	4	2	2	0	12	4	8	+8
Broncos-UNAH	4	2	2	0	5	4	8	+4
Valencia	8	1	5	2	6	7	8	-1
Honduras Salzburg	4	2	1	1	6	5	7	+1
Federal	4	2	1	1	6	5	7	+1
Palestino	4	2	0	2	7	7	6	+0
Real Comayagua	4	1	2	1	6	6	5	+0

== International competition ==
=== CONCACAF Champions' Cup ===
- 1963 CONCACAF Champions' Cup

First Round v. (Guatemala) Xelajú MC – 2:2, 0:6 (Xelajú advanced 8:2 on aggregate)

- 1972 CONCACAF Champions' Cup

Final Round v. (Mexico) Toluca – 1:3, 0:1 (Toluca advanced 4:1 on aggregate)

- 1973 CONCACAF Champions' Cup

First Round v. (Costa Rica) Saprissa – 0:2, 0:1 (Saprissa advanced 3:0 on aggregate)

- 1982 CONCACAF Champions' Cup

First Round v. (United States) Brooklyn Dodgers – (Brooklyn Dodgers withdrew)
Second Round v. (Mexico) Pumas UNAM – 2:2, 0:5 (Pumas UNAM advance 7:2 on aggregate)

- 1984 CONCACAF Champions' Cup

Third Round v. (United States) NY Pancyprian-Freedoms – 1:1, 1:2 (NY Pancyprian-Freedoms advance 3:2 on aggregate)

- 1985 CONCACAF Champions' Cup

First Round v. (El Salvador) FAS – 1:1, 2:1 (Vida advance 3:2 on aggregate)
Second Round v. (Mexico) América – 1:0, 0:3 (América advance 3:1 on aggregate)

=== Torneo Fraternidad ===
- 1981 Torneo Fraternidad

First Round v. (Guatemala) Juventud Retalteca – 0:1, 3:1 (Vida advance 3:2 on aggregate)
Second Round v. (Honduras) Marathón – (Marathón advance)

- 1982 Torneo Fraternidad

First Round v. (El Salvador) Juventud Independiente – 2:1, 1:0 (Vida advance 3:1 on aggregate)
Second Round v. (Guatemala) Xelajú MC – 0:0, 0:2 (Xelajú MC advance 2:0 on aggregate)

== All-time top scorers ==
(As of 8 February 2012)

- (Honduras) Carlos Alvarado (76 goals)
- (Honduras) Dennis Hinds (44 goals)
- (Honduras) Arturo Garden (40 goals)
- (Honduras) Matilde Selim Lacayo (39 goals)
- (Honduras) Morris Garden (37 goals)
- (Honduras) Jorge Pineda (37 goals)
- (Honduras) Enrique Mendoza (36 goals)

== Current squad ==
As of 23 June 2023

Note: Flags indicate national team as defined under FIFA eligibility rules; some limited exceptions apply. Players may hold more than one non-FIFA nationality.

No.	Pos.	Nation	Player
1	GK	ARG	Matías Quinteros
2	DF	HON	Bryan Barrios
3	DF	USA	Jonathan Bornstein (vice-captain)
4	DF	HON	Hilder Colón
6	DF	HON	Roger Sander
7	MF	HON	Maikel García
8	MF	HON	Gerson Chávez
9	FW	ARG	Gabriel Tellas
10	MF	HON	Marcelo Canales (captain)
11	FW	HON	Josué Villafranca
12	MF	HON	Henry Sánchez
13	MF	HON	Cristian Manaiza
15	DF	HON	Yexon Villalta
16	FW	HON	Ederson Fúnez
18	DF	HON	Danilo Palacios

No.	Pos.	Nation	Player
19	DF	HON	Clever Portillo
20	MF	HON	Johan Centeno
23	FW	ARG	Brian Visser
24	FW	HON	Sebastián Espinoza
25	DF	HON	Jefferson Palacios
26	GK	HON	Áxel Padilla
27	MF	HON	Lauro Chimilio
30	GK	HON	Amílcar Bengoché
32	FW	HON	Marvin Bernárdez
34	DF	HON	Michael Rosales
35	MF	HON	Dayron Suazo
-	MF	HON	Carlos Estrada
-	MF	HON	Karlet Barahona
-	FW	HON	Jorge Castrillo

=== Current technical staff ===
Position	Staff
Head coach	(Portugal) Fernando Mira
Assistant coach	(Portugal) Orlando Fernandes
Goalkeeping coach	(Honduras) José Luis Norales
Fitness coach	(Honduras) Henry Oliva

|}

== Managers ==
- (Guatemala) Aroldo Cordón
- (Guatemala) Carlos Enrique "Ronco" Wellman (1971)
- (Honduras) Roberto González (1981)
- (Honduras) Gonzalo Zelaya (1983)
- (Honduras) Roberto González (1984–85)
- (Honduras) Mario Ramón Sandoval (1995)
- (Uruguay) Ariel Sena (1995–1996)
- (Honduras) Enrique Grey Fúnez (1996)
- (Argentina) Héctor Vargas (1999–00)
- (Honduras) David Medina (2001)
- (Uruguay) Ricardo Ortiz (2006)
- (Honduras) Carlos Martínez (2007 – Dec 12)
- (Honduras) Jorge Pineda (Dec 2012 – April 14)
- (Honduras) Ramón Maradiaga (May 2014 – Sept 15)
- (Honduras) Elvin López (201?–)
- (Honduras) Carlos Alberto Pavon Plumer (2016 – December 2019)
- (Honduras) Raúl Martínez Sambula ( - February 2019)
- (Honduras) Hector Castellon (February 2019 -)
- (Uruguay) Fernando Araújo (June 2019 - 2020)
- (Honduras) Ramón Maradiaga (August 2020 - November 2020)
- (Honduras) Nerlin Membreño (November 2020 - April 2021)
- (Portugal) Fernando Mira (April 2021 - )

== Affiliated clubs ==
- (Spain) Atlético Madrid
