= Carlos Meza =

Peruvian footballer (born 2002)

Personal information
- Full name: Carlos Daniel Meza Villa
- Date of birth: 31 October 2002 (age 24)
- Place of birth: Coronel Portillo, Peru
- Height: 1.65 m (5 ft 5 in)
- Position: Midfielder

Team information
- Current team: Mannucci (on loan from Sporting Cristal)
- Number: 21

Youth career
- –2021: Sporting Cristal

Senior career*
Years	Team	Apps	(Gls)
2021–	Sporting Cristal	0	(0)
2021–	→ Mannucci (loan)	2	(0)

International career^{‡}
2019	Peru U17	1	(0)
- * Club domestic league appearances and goals as of 05:00, 25 October 2021 (UTC) ‡ National team caps and goals as of 05:00, 25 October 2021 (UTC)

Carlos Daniel Meza Villa (born 31 October 2002) is a Peruvian footballer who plays as a midfielder for Alianza Lima.

== Career statistics ==
=== Club ===
As of 25 October 2021.

Club	Season	League			Cup		Continental		Other		Total	
Club	Season	Division	Apps	Goals	Apps	Goals	Apps	Goals	Apps	Goals	Apps	Goals
Sporting Cristal	2021	Peruvian Primera División	0	0	0	0	0	0	0	0	0	0
Mannucci (loan)	2021	Peruvian Primera División	2	0	0	0	0	0	0	0	2	0
Career total			2	0	0	0	0	0	0	0	2	0
