= Alberto Solís =

Spanish footballer

Personal information
- Full name: Alberto Solís Gómez
- Date of birth: 1 January 1998 (age 28)
- Place of birth: Tomares, Spain
- Height: 1.78 m (5 ft 10 in)
- Position: Midfielder

Youth career
- 2006–2015: Sevilla
- 2015–2017: Celta

Senior career*
Years	Team	Apps	(Gls)
2016–2021	Celta B	76	(11)
2021–2023	Cultural Leonesa	67	(10)
2023–2024	Real Unión	38	(12)
2024–2026	Andorra	3	(0)
2025–2026	→ Arenteiro (loan)	1	(0)

International career
2013	Spain U16	1	(1)
- * Club domestic league appearances and goals as of 30 November 2025

Alberto Solís Gómez (born 1 January 1998) is a Spanish professional footballer who plays as a midfielder.

== Club career ==
Born in Tomares, Seville, Andalusia, Solís began his career with Sevilla FC, before signing for RC Celta de Vigo on 25 July 2015. He made his senior debut with the reserves on 20 August 2016, coming on as a late substitute for goalscorer Juan Hernández in a 1–1 Segunda División B away draw against UD Mutilvera.

Solís became a permanent member of the B-team ahead of the 2017–18 season, but suffered a serious knee injury in October 2017, being sidelined for seven months. Upon returning, he became a first-choice, but saw his playing time being reduced over the following campaigns, and left Celta after six years on 15 June 2021.

On 20 August 2021, Solís joined Primera División RFEF side Cultural y Deportiva Leonesa. After scoring seven goals during the season, he renewed his contract for another year on 22 July 2022.

On 26 July 2023, Solís agreed to a deal with Real Unión also in the third division. He scored a career-best 12 goals for the side, but opted to leave on 24 June 2024, and joined fellow league team FC Andorra on a two-year contract two days later.

In September 2024, Solís suffered another knee injury, being sidelined for the remainder of the campaign. On 19 August 2025, he was loaned to CD Arenteiro for one year.

== International career ==
In August 2013, Solís was called up to the Spain national under-16 team for two friendlies against Switzerland.
