= C.D. Troya =

Former Honduran football club

Troya
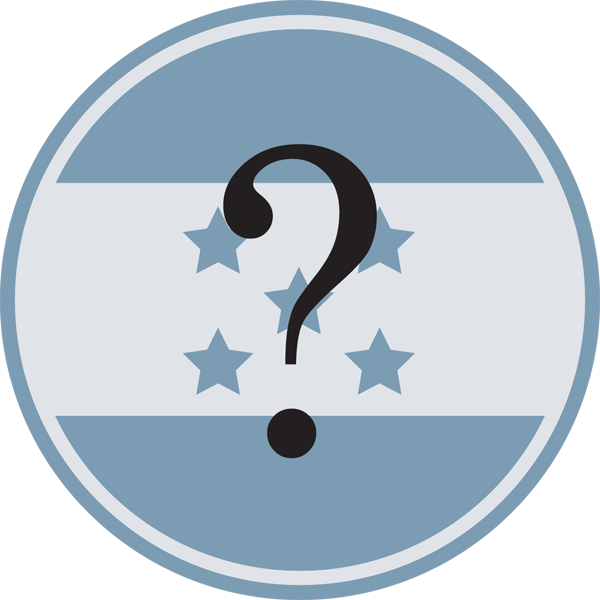
- Full name: Club Deportivo Troya El Salvador
- Nickname: Los Mitológicos (The Mythologicals)
- Founded: 19 April 1949; 77 years ago
- Ground: Estadio Tiburcio Carías Andino, Tegucigalpa, Honduras
- Capacity: 35,000
| Home colours | Away colours |

Club Deportivo Troya was a Honduran football club based in Tegucigalpa, Honduras.

== History ==
Founded in 1949 by Carlos Padilla Velásquez, they played in first division in 1965–66, 1966–67, 1971–72, 1972–73 and 1973–74

== Achievements ==
- Segunda División

Winners (1): 1970–71

== League performance ==
| Regular season | | | | | | | | | | Post season | | | | | | | | |
| Season | Pos | P | W | D | L | F | A | PTS | +/- | Pos | P | W | D | L | F | A | PTS | +/- |
|---|---|---|---|---|---|---|---|---|---|---|---|---|---|---|---|---|---|---|
| 1965–66 | 4th | 18 | 8 | 6 | 4 | 18 | 14 | 22 | +4 | No Post season this year | | | | | | | | |
| 1966–67 | 10th | 18 | 3 | 4 | 11 | 14 | 30 | 10 | -16 | No Post season this year | | | | | | | | |
| 1971–72 | 6th | 27 | 5 | 11 | 11 | 28 | 36 | 27 | -8 | No Post season this year | | | | | | | | |
| 1972–73 | 8th | 9 | 2 | 2 | 5 | 6 | 19 | 6 | -13 | No Post season this year | | | | | | | | |
| 1973–74 | 10th | 27 | 3 | 4 | 20 | 16 | 50 | 10 | -34 | No Post season this year | | | | | | | | |

- The 1972–73 season was canceled after nine rounds.
