= C.D. Honduras Progreso =

Honduran football club

Honduras Progreso
- Full name: Club Deportivo Honduras Progreso
- Nicknames: El Honduras; Los Diablos; Progreseños; Los Vagos; Los enanos Los Ribereños; Conjunto de la Perla del Ulúa
- Founded: 7 November 1965; 60 years ago as Club Deportivo Honduras
- Ground: Estadio Humberto Micheletti; El Progreso, Honduras
- Capacity: 5,000
- Chairman: (Honduras) Elías Nazar
- Manager: (Colombia) John Jairo López
- League: Liga Nacional
- 2019 Apertura: Liga Nacional, 10th (regular season); DNQ (postseason)
- Website: https://www.lnphn.com/team/progreso/
Home colours	Away colours	Third colours

Club Deportivo Honduras Progreso (commonly referred to as Honduras Progreso or simply Honduras), is a Honduran football club based in El Progreso, Honduras. It was founded in 1965 and currently plays in the Honduran Liga Nacional.

== History ==
=== Club Deportivo Honduras ===
The club was founded in 1965 under the name Club Deportivo Honduras and is one of the League's founding clubs. They were in top flight football until 1969 where they finished last and were relegated to Segunda División (Second Division), and soon after dissolved.

=== Honduras Progreso ===
After many years of absence in Honduran professional football, the club was brought back as Club Deportivo Honduras Progreso in 2011.

Former national goalkeeper Wilmer Cruz became manager in 2013 but only earned his coaching licence in summer 2013. In December 2015 they beat Motagua 4–1 to win the 2015 Apertura league title with The honduran coach, Héctor Castellón.

== Honours ==
- Liga Nacional

Winners (1): 2015–16 A
Runners-up (1): 2016–17 C

- Liga de Ascenso

Winners (2): 2013–14 A, 2013–14 C

== League and cups performance ==
Regular season			Postseason		Others		
Season	Finish	Record	Finish	Record	Cup	Supercup	International
1965–66	6th	8–3–7 (26:25)	Not applicable		Not held		Didn't enter
1966–67	6th	7–4–7 (25:30)	Not applicable		Not held		Didn't enter
1967–68	3rd	8–4–6 (31:23)	Not applicable		Not held		Didn't enter
1968–69	9th	5–8–14 (20:53)	Not applicable		Group stage	Not held	Didn't enter
1969–70	10th	5–7–15 (28:45)	Not applicable		Not held		Didn't enter
2014–15 A	4th	7–7–4 (34:31)	Playoffs	1–0–1 (4:4)	Quarterfinals	Not held	Didn't enter
2014–15 C	8th	5–3–10 (26:35)	Didn't enter		Quarterfinals	Not held	Didn't enter
2015–16 A	1st	11–3–4 (31:21)	Winners	1–3–0 (5:4)	Quarterfinals	Didn't enter	Didn't enter
2015–16 C	8th	3–6–9 (21:30)	Didn't enter		Quarterfinals	Didn't enter	Didn't enter
2016–17 A	7th	7–3–8 (23:31)	Didn't enter		Round of 32	Runners-up	Group stage (Champions League)
2016–17 C	4th	9–4–5 (28:26)	Runners-up	2–1–3 (8:12)	Round of 32	Runners-up	Group stage (Champions League)
2017–18 A	10th	4–1–13 (26:37)	Didn't enter		Not held	Didn't enter	Round of 16 (CONCACAF League)
2017–18 C	5th	8–2–8 (22:30)	Playoffs	0–2–0 (1:1)	Not held	Didn't enter	Round of 16 (CONCACAF League)
2018–19 A	7th	6–4–8 (27:31)	Didn't enter		Round of 32	Didn't enter	
2018–19 C	10th	2–3–13 (11:37)	Saved	2–0–0 (5:3)	Round of 32	Didn't enter	

== International performance ==
Competition	Record	Finish
2016–17 CONCACAF Champions League	2–1–1 (4:4)	Group stage
2017 CONCACAF League	0–0–2 (0:2)	Round of 16

=== All-time record v other clubs ===
As of 9 August 2017

Club	Record	Goals
(Panama) Chorrillo	0–0–2	0:2
(Mexico) UNAM	1–0–1	2:3
(Trinidad and Tobago) W Connection	1–1–0	2:1
Totals	2–1–3	4:6

== Current squad ==
As of 20 January 2025

Note: Flags indicate national team as defined under FIFA eligibility rules; some limited exceptions apply. Players may hold more than one non-FIFA nationality.

No.	Pos.	Nation	Player
2	DF	COL	Eduardo Peñaloza
6	DF	HON	Steven Bonilla
7	MF	HON	Nixon Cruz
10	MF	COL	Jhan Mora
10	FW	ESP	Ángel Carrascosa
11	FW	COL	Harold Sandoval Lasso
14	FW	HON	Alan Turcios
19	DF	HON	Alberto Paredes
19	MF	HON	Diego Rosales
26	DF	HON	César Moreno

No.	Pos.	Nation	Player
29	MF	HON	Antony Flores
30	GK	HON	Alex Rivera
31	FW	HON	Aldo Fajardo
62	MF	HON	Denuar Figueroa
-	GK	HON	Anthony Flores
-	DF	HON	Eduardo Rivera
-	DF	HON	Cristian Bernàrdez
-	DF	COL	Deivy Balanta
-	DF	HON	Victor Araúz

== Historical list of coaches ==
Name	Dates
(Honduras) Tulio Castellanos	2011-2012
(Honduras) Allan Bennett	2012
(Honduras) Leonel Machado	2012-2013
(Honduras) Wilmer Cruz	2013-2015
(Honduras) Héctor Castellón	2015-2017
(Honduras) Wilmer Cruz	2017
(Honduras) Nerlin Membreño	2017
(Colombia) Horacio Londoño	2018
(Honduras) Mauro Reyes	2018
(Honduras) Hernán García	2019
(Honduras) Reynaldo Clavasquín	2019
(Honduras) Luis Alvarado (interim)	2019
(Colombia) Horacio Londoño	2019
(Honduras) Ovidio Fúnez (interim)	2019
(Honduras) Héctor Castellón	2020
(Uruguay) Julio “Palomo” Rodríguez	2020
(Honduras) Mauro Reyes	2020
(Honduras) David Fúnez (interim)	2020
(Uruguay) Fernando Araújo	2021
(Colombia) John Jairo López	2021- Present
