= Carlos Suazo =

Honduran footballer

Personal information
- Full name: Carlos Humberto Suazo Lagos
- Date of birth: 8 March 1936
- Place of birth: Tela, Honduras
- Date of death: 28 April 2019 (aged 83)
- Place of death: Tegucigalpa, Honduras
- Position: Striker

Senior career*
Years	Team	Apps	(Gls)
1952–1953	Sonaguera FC		
1953–1954	CD Federal		
1954–1958	CD Olimpia		
1958–1959	Elche CF		
1960–1969	CD Olimpia		
- * Club domestic league appearances and goals

Carlos Humberto Suazo Lagos (8 March 1936 - 28 April 2019) was a Honduran footballer and football manager who played as a striker.

== Career ==
Suazo started his career with Honduran side Sonaguera FC. In 1953, he signed for Honduran side CD Federal. In 1954, he signed for Honduran side CD Olimpia. In 1958, he signed for Spanish second-tier side Elche CF. He helped the club achieve promotion. In 1960, he returned to Honduran side CD Olimpia.

As a manager, Suazo led Olimpia to the 1969–70 Honduran Liga Nacional title. He also served as manager for Broncos de Choluteca, Sula de La Lima, and Tiburones de San Lorenzo.

== Personal life ==
Suazo was born in Tela, Honduras on 8 March 1936. He died on 28 April 2019 in Tegucigalpa. Suazo was the brother of Honduran footballer Raúl Suazo Lagos.
