= C.D. Federal =

Federal
- Full name: Club Deportivo Federal
- Nickname(s): Academia verdeamarilla Los Académicos
- Founded: 14 August 1935; 89 years ago
- Dissolved: 19 May 2018; 6 years ago
- Ground: Estadio Tiburcio Carías Andino; Tegucigalpa, Honduras
- Capacity: 35,000
Home colours	Away colours

Club Deportivo Federal was a football club based in Tegucigalpa, Honduras.

== History ==
The club was founded August 14, 1935, in the house of Mrs. Idilia Rubio in colonia La Hoya (La Hoya neighborhood) in Tegucigalpa. In the 1940s and 1950s it was one of the big three clubs in Honduras' capital city and the city's clasico was the Federal vs Motagua game.

They were Honduran Amateur League champions in the 1954–55 season.

== Achievements ==
- Segunda División

Winners (2): 1973, 1998–99
Runners-up (2): 1967–68, 1978–79

- Amateur League

Winners (1): 1953
Runners-up (1): 1952

- Francisco Morazán Major League

Winners (3): 1952, 1953, 1962

== League performance ==
Regular season										Post season							
Season	Pos.	G	W	D	L	F:A	PTS	+/−	Ded.	Pos.	G	W	D	L	F:A	PTS	+/−
1974–75	7th	36	11	10	15	33:38	45	−15	–	Didn't enter							
1975–76	9th	27	3	15	9	21:36	21	−15	–	Didn't enter							
1976–77	8th	27	6	8	13	19:32	20	−13	–	Didn't enter							
1977–78	10th	27	4	12	11	20:32	20	−12	–	Didn't enter							
1999–2000 A	10th	18	1	6	11	18:37	9	−19	–	Didn't enter							
1999–2000 C	6th	18	5	7	6	26:29	22	−3	–	4th	4	1	0	3	2:8	3	−6

== Managers ==
- (Honduras) “Foncho” Uclés
- (Honduras) “Popo” Godoy
- (Honduras) Carlos Padilla Velásquez (1999–2000)
- (Argentina) Carlos de Toro (1999–2000)
- (Honduras) Dennis Allen (1999–2000)
