= Francisco Morazán Major League =

Francisco Morazán Championship
- Founded: 15 November 1944
- First season: 1947
- Folded: 1964
- Country: Honduras
- Divisions: 1
- Most championships: Olimpia (9)

The Francisco Morazán Championship was a yearly football tournament which was played in Honduras from 1947 to 1964. The tournament included teams from the department of Francisco Morazán only and served as a qualification phase to the national championship, also known as the Honduran Amateur League.

== Winners ==
Year	Champions
1947	Motagua
1948	Motagua
1949	Olimpia
1950	Motagua
1951	Motagua
1952	Federal
1953	Federal
1954	Motagua
1955–56	Olimpia
1957	Olimpia
1958	Olimpia
1959	Olimpia
1960	Olimpia
1961	Olimpia
1962	Federal
1963	Olimpia
1964	Olimpia

== By team ==
Team	Titles	Years won
Olimpia	9	1949, 1955–56, 1957, 1958, 1959, 1960, 1961, 1963, 1964
Motagua	5	1947, 1948, 1950, 1951, 1954
Federal	3	1952, 1953, 1962

== See also ==
- Honduran Amateur League
