= Cortés Department =

Cortés Department Departamento de Cortés
- Department
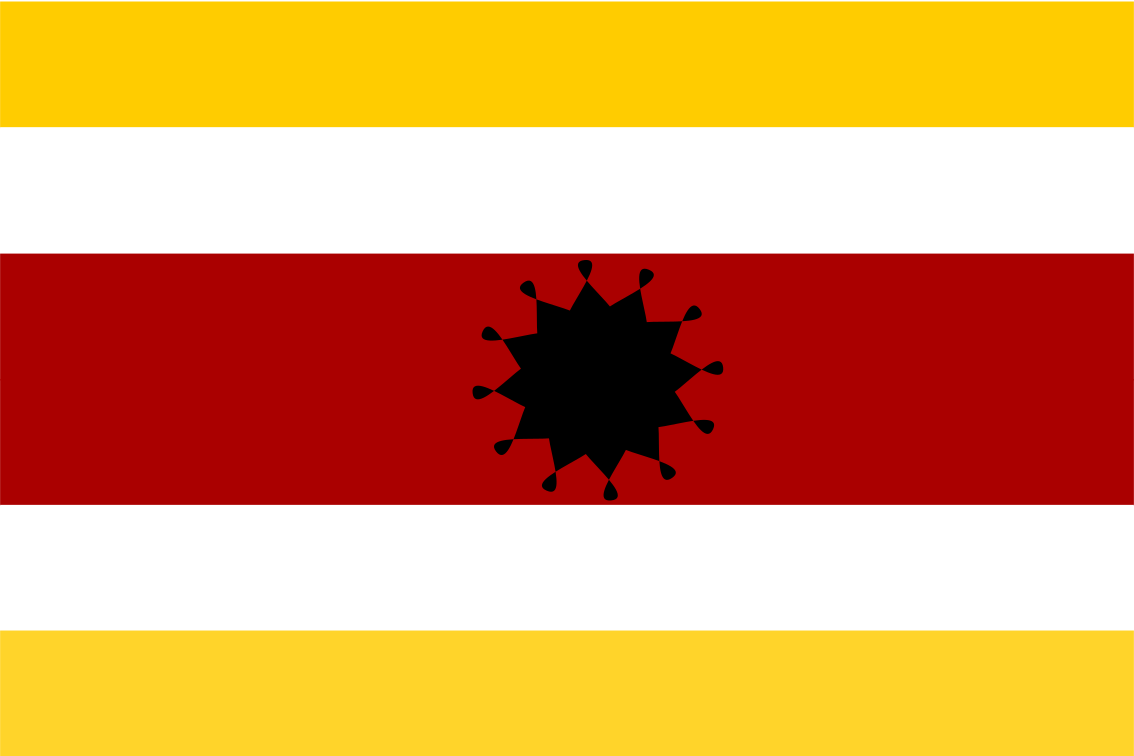
- Flag

- Location of Cortés in Honduras
- Coordinates: 15°30′10″N 88°0′49″W
- Country: Honduras
- Municipalities: 12
- Villages: 284
- Founded: 4 July 1893
- Named for: Hernán Cortés
- Capital city: San Pedro Sula

Government
  - Type: Departmental
  - Governor: Alexa Dinorah Solorzano (2022–2026) (LIBRE)

Area
  - Total: 3,911 km^{2} (1,510 sq mi)
- Highest elevation: 2,242 m (7,356 ft)
- Lowest elevation: 0 m (0 ft)

Population (2015)
  - Total: 1,621,762
  - Rank: 1st in Honduras
  - Density: 414.7/km^{2} (1,074/sq mi)
  - Ethnicities: Ladino Garifuna
  - Religions: Catholicism Evangelicalism

GDP (Nominal, 2015 US dollar)
  - Total: $6.6 billion (2023)
  - Per capita: $3,200 (2023)

GDP (PPP, 2015 int. dollar)
  - Total: $13.8 billion (2023)
  - Per capita: $6,700 (2023)
- Time zone: UTC-6 (CDT)
- Postal code: San Pedro Sula: 21101, 21102, 21103, 21104, Puerto Cortés 21301
- ISO 3166 code: HN-CR
- HDI (2021): 0.663 medium · 2nd of 18
- Statistics derived from Consult INE online database: Population and Housing Census 2013

Cortés is one of the 18 departments of Honduras. The department covers an area of 3,954 km^{2} and, in 2015, had an estimated population of 1,612,762, making it the most populous in Honduras. The Merendón Mountains rise in western Cortés, but the department is mostly a tropical lowland, the Sula Valley, crossed by the Ulúa River and the Chamelecón river.

It was created in 1893 from parts of the departments of Santa Bárbara and Yoro. The departmental capital is San Pedro Sula. Main cities also include Choloma, La Lima, Villanueva, and the sea ports of Puerto Cortés and Omoa. The Atlantic coast of the Department of Cortés is known for its many excellent beaches.

Cortés is the economic heartland of Honduras, as the Sula Valley is the country's main agricultural and industrial region. US banana companies arrived in the area in the late 19th century, and established vast plantations, as well as infrastructure to ship the fruit to the United States. San Pedro Sula attracted substantial numbers of European, Central American, and Palestinian and Lebanese immigrants. Industry flourishes in the department, and Cortés today hosts most of the country's assembly plants, known as maquilas.

Cortés is home to several prehispanic archaeological sites, including Cerro Palenque, Playa de los Muertos, Los Naranjos, and Travesía.

== Municipalities ==
1. Choloma
2. La Lima
3. Omoa
4. Pimienta
5. Potrerillos
6. Puerto Cortés
7. San Antonio de Cortés
8. San Francisco de Yojoa
9. San Manuel
10. San Pedro Sula
11. Santa Cruz de Yojoa
12. Villanueva
