= 1971–72 Honduran Liga Nacional =

Liga Nacional
- Season: 1971–72
- Champions: Olimpia (4th)
- Relegated: Lempira de Guaruma
- CONCACAF Champions' Cup: Olimpia; Vida
- Matches: 135
- Goals: 299 (2.21 per match)
- Top goalscorer: Alvarado (14)

The 1971–72 Honduran Liga Nacional season was the 7th edition of the Honduran Liga Nacional. The format of the tournament remained the same as the previous season. Club Deportivo Olimpia won the title and qualified to the 1972 CONCACAF Champions' Cup along with runners-up C.D.S. Vida.

== 1971–72 teams ==
- Atlético Indio (Tegucigalpa)
- España (San Pedro Sula)
- Lempira de Guaruma (La Lima)
- Marathón (San Pedro Sula)
- Motagua (Tegucigalpa)
- Olimpia (Tegucigalpa)
- Platense (Puerto Cortés)
- Troya (Tegucigalpa, promoted)
- Verdún (Tegucigalpa)
- Vida (La Ceiba)
- Verdún purchased C.D. Atlético Español's franchise.

== Regular season ==
=== Standings ===
Pos	Team	Pld	W	D	L	GF	GA	GD	Pts	Qualification or relegation
1	Olimpia (Note: Olimpia 1971–72 champions as regular season winner.)	27	15	10	2	41	18	+23	40	Qualified to the 1972 CONCACAF Champions' Cup
2	Vida	27	16	3	8	42	25	+17	35	Qualified to the 1972 CONCACAF Champions' Cup
3	Motagua	27	14	5	8	37	23	+14	33	
4	España	27	12	7	8	27	21	+6	31	
5	Marathón	27	9	9	9	37	33	+4	27	
6	Troya	27	11	5	11	28	36	−8	27	
7	Platense	27	5	11	11	30	37	−7	21	
8	Verdún	27	5	11	11	10	25	−15	21	
9	Atlético Indio	27	3	13	11	23	36	−13	19	
10	Lempira de Guaruma	27	5	6	16	24	45	−21	16	Relegated to Segunda División (Note: Lempira relegated to second division.)

== Top scorer ==
- (Honduras) Carlos Alvarado (Vida) with 14 goals

== Squads ==
Atlético Indio
(Honduras) Ramón Antonio "Pilín" Brand
Real España
(Costa Rica) Carlos Luis "Macho" Arrieta	(Honduras) Dagoberto Cubero	(Brazil) Pedro Caetano Da Silva
(Honduras) Exequiel "Estupiñán" García	(Honduras) Carlos Francisco "Chico Chico" Handal	(Honduras) Mario "Pelola" López
(Honduras) Domingo "Mingo" Ramos	(Honduras) Jacobo Sarmiento	(Honduras) Rigoberto "Aserradero" Velásquez
(Honduras) Jaime Villegas
Lempira de Guaruma
(Honduras) Carlos Alberto Acosta "El Indio" Lara	(Honduras) Melchor Argeñal	(Honduras) Mario Felipe "Cofra" Caballero Álvarez
(Honduras) César Augusto Dávila Puerto	(Honduras) Robert Anthony "Charola" Gaynor	(Honduras) Amílcar "Mica" López
(Honduras) Rigoberto Martínez	(Honduras) Eleázar Rodríguez	(Honduras) Samuel de Jesús "Chamel" Tejada
(Honduras) Francisco "Pantera" Velásquez
Marathón
(Honduras) Roberto Bailey	(Honduras) Arnulfo Echeverría	(Honduras) Alexander "Nina" Guillén
(Honduras) Dennis "Plitis" Lagos	(Honduras) Alberto Mancía	(Brazil) Flavio Ortega
(Honduras) Martín "Piruleta" Rodríguez	(Honduras) Gil "Fátima" Valerio	(Honduras) Allan Ricardo Young
Motagua
(Nicaragua) Salvador Dubois Leiva	(Honduras) Julio Meza	(Honduras) Nelson Benavídez
(Honduras) Roberto Jérez	(Honduras) Óscar Rolando "Martillo" Hernández	(Honduras) Reynaldo Ismael Colón
(Brazil) Roberto Abrussezze	(Honduras) Alfonso Uclés	(Honduras) Edgardo Orellana
(Honduras) Rubén "Chamaco" Guifarro	(Honduras) Elio Banegas	(Honduras) Mariano Godoy
(Honduras) Héctor "Lin" Zelaya	(Honduras) Lenard Wells	(Honduras) Carlos Andrés Sanabria
(Brazil) Linauro de Paula	(Honduras) Tomás Máximo	(Honduras) Fermín Navarro
(Honduras) Federico Budde	(Honduras) Jesús Castillo	(Honduras) José Luis Cruz Figueroa
(Honduras) Marcos Banegas	(Honduras) Marco Antonio Calderón	(Honduras) Mario Blandón Article
(Honduras) Ricardo Cárdenas	(Honduras) Juliano Netto	(Honduras) Alberto "Furia" Solís
(Honduras) Egdomilio Díaz	(Brazil) Geraldo Baptista	(Honduras) Alfonso "Garrinchito" Gutiérrez
(Honduras) Juan Manuel Coello	(Honduras) José María "Chema" Durón	(Brazil) Ado Baptista
Olimpia
(Honduras) Ángel Ramón "Mon" Paz	(Honduras) Reynaldo Mejía Ortega	(Honduras) Samuel Sentini
(Honduras) Juan Ventura "La Gata" López	(Honduras) Selvin Cárcamo	(Honduras) Juan Isidro "Juanín" Lanza
(Honduras) Miguel Angel "Shinola" Matamoros	(Honduras) Marco Antonio "Tonin" Mendoza	(Honduras) Jorge Alberto "Indio" Urquía Elvir
(Honduras) Jorge Alberto "Cejas" Brand Guevara	(Honduras) Rigoberto "Shula" Gómez	(Honduras) Raúl Suazo Lagos
Platense
(Honduras) Luis Alonso Guzmán Velásquez	(Honduras) Miguel "Miguelín" Bernárdez	(Honduras) Martín Castillo
(Colombia) Reynaldo Castro Gil	(Honduras) Jimmy Steward	(Honduras) Tomás Cedricks Ewens "Quito" Wagner
(Colombia) Oscar Teherán	(Honduras) Carlos "Care" Alvarado	(Colombia) Oscar Marino Piedrahíta
Troya
(Honduras) José Domingo "Yuyo" Tróchez
Verdún
(Brazil) Roberto Abrussezze	(Brazil) Geraldo Baptista	(Honduras) Fernando "Azulejo" Bulnes
(Honduras) Joaquín "Quin" Bulnes	(Honduras) Manuel "Nell" Bulnes	(Honduras) Egdomilio "Milo" Díaz
(Brazil) José Ferreira Dos Santos	(Honduras) Víctor Armando "Teniente" López	(Honduras) Adalberto "Chino" Menjívar
(Honduras) "Tamalín" Ordóñez	(Brazil) Flavio Ortega Violante	(Honduras) Ronald Quilter
(Honduras) Oscar "Zorro" Velásquez
Victoria
(Honduras) René "Maravilla" Suazo
Vida
(Honduras) Óscar "Burra" Acosta	(Honduras) Carlos Humberto Alvarado Osorto	(Honduras) Jaime Barahona
(Honduras) Manuel Bernárdez Calderón	(Guatemala) Jesús Octavio Cifuentes	(Honduras) Gustavo Adolfo "Gorsha" Collins
(Honduras) Zacarías "Frijolito" Collins	(Chile) Óscar Alfredo Fariñas	(Honduras) Óscar Omar "Comay" Flores
(Honduras) Arturo Edilson "Junia" Garden	(Honduras) Morris Garden	(Honduras) Roberto Hayes Galindo
(Honduras) Humberto Laínez	(Honduras) Jairo López	(Honduras) Marco Antonio Marcos Peña
(Honduras) Tomás "Tommy" Marshall	(Honduras) Mario Murillo	(Honduras) Gilberto René Núñez
(Honduras) José López "Rulo" Paz	(Honduras) José López Zelaya	(Honduras) Wilfredo "Will" Rodríguez
(Honduras) José María "Chema" Salinas	(Honduras) Carlos Sevilla Rodríguez	(Honduras) Gustavo Antonio "Danto" Urbina

== Trivia ==
- Atlético Español changed its name to Verdún this season.

== Known results ==
=== Round 1 ===
11 July 1971

Motagua	1–0	Verdún
Hernández

Tegucigalpa

Lempira	1–0	Marathón
Martínez

=== Fecha 13 ===
Verdún	0–0	España

Tegucigalpa

=== Fecha 14 ===
Troya	1–0	Verdún

Tegucigalpa

=== Fecha 15 ===
Platense	1–0	Verdún

San Pedro Sula

=== Fecha 16 ===
Verdún	0–0	Motagua

Tegucigalpa

=== Fecha 17 ===
Atlético Indio	0–0	Verdún

Tegucigalpa

=== Fecha 18 ===
Verdún	0–4	Marathón

Tegucigalpa

=== Fecha 19 ===
Verdún	0–0	Troya

Tegucigalpa

=== Fecha 20 ===
Verdún	0–0	Atlético Indio

Tegucigalpa

=== Unknown rounds ===
15 August 1971

España	3–0	Marathón

San Pedro Sula
29 August 1971

Motagua	2–0	Troya

Tegucigalpa
12 September 1971

Platense	1–3	Lempira

San Pedro Sula
17 October 1971

Olimpia	2–1	Atlético Indio
Matamoros

Tegucigalpa
31 October 1971

Platense	1–2	Olimpia

San Pedro Sula
9 January 1972

Marathón	5–1	Lempira

San Pedro Sula
16 January 1972

Motagua	2–1	Platense
Cruz

Tegucigalpa
7 May 1972

Olimpia	5–0	Troya

Tegucigalpa
4 June 1972

Lempira	1–3	Olimpia
Mayorga		Mejía; Flores

San Pedro Sula

Victoria	2–5	Olimpia

La Ceiba

Marathón	2–2	Motagua
Echeverría

Referee: Cedillos

Lempira	1–4	Vida

San Pedro Sula

Marathón	3–3	Lempira

San Pedro Sula

España	2–0	Lempira
Castro; Sevilla

San Pedro Sula

Lempira	2–1	España
Perdomo; Martínez		Castro

San Pedro Sula

España	2–0	Lempira
Sevilla; Greenech

San Pedro Sula

España	0–0	Motagua

San Pedro Sula
