= 1970–71 Honduran Liga Nacional =

Liga Nacional
- Season: 1970–71
- Champions: Motagua (2nd)
- Relegated: Victoria
- CONCACAF Champions' Cup: Motagua; Olimpia
- Matches: 136
- Goals: 333 (2.45 per match)
- Top goalscorer: Alvarado (16)

The 1970–71 Honduran Liga Nacional season was the 6th edition of the Honduran Liga Nacional. The format of the tournament remained the same as the previous season. C.D. Motagua won the title and qualified to the 1971 CONCACAF Champions' Cup along with runners-up Club Deportivo Olimpia.

== 1970–71 teams ==
- Atlético Español (Tegucigalpa, promoted)
- Atlético Indio (Tegucigalpa)
- España (San Pedro Sula)
- Lempira de Guaruma (La Lima)
- Marathón (San Pedro Sula)
- Motagua (Tegucigalpa)
- Olimpia (Tegucigalpa)
- Platense (Puerto Cortés)
- Victoria (La Ceiba)
- Vida (La Ceiba)

== Regular season ==
=== Standings ===
Pos	Team	Pld	W	D	L	GF	GA	GD	Pts	Qualification or relegation
1	Motagua	27	13	11	3	43	18	+25	37 (Note: Motagua and Olimpia to play an extra match for the title.)	Qualified to the 1971 CONCACAF Champions' Cup
2	Olimpia	27	16	5	6	43	19	+24	37	Qualified to the 1971 CONCACAF Champions' Cup
3	Marathón	27	12	8	7	35	25	+10	32	
4	España	27	10	10	7	36	29	+7	30	
5	Vida	27	10	10	7	38	32	+6	30	
6	Platense	27	8	11	8	25	29	−4	27	
7	Atlético Indio	27	8	7	12	29	34	−5	23	
8	Atlético Español	27	6	9	12	29	47	−18	21	
9	Lempira de Guaruma	27	5	9	13	25	44	−19	19	
10	Victoria	27	3	8	16	28	54	−26	14	Relegated to the Segunda División (Note: Victoria relegated to second division.)

=== Championship playoff ===
25 April 1971 Playoff	Motagua	1–1 (a.e.t.)	Olimpia	Tegucigalpa, Francisco Morazán
16:00 CST	Colón 117'		Bran 96'	Stadium: Estadio Tiburcio Carías Andino; Attendance: 16,680 (L40,223); Referee: Roberto Morales

Motagua	Olimpia

GK	–	(Nicaragua) Salvador Dubois
DF	–	(Honduras) Nelson Benavídez
DF	–	(Honduras) Julio Meza
DF	–	(Honduras) José Cruz
DF	–	(Honduras) Arnaldo Zelaya
MF	–	(Brazil) Linauro di Paula
MF	–	(Honduras) Rubén Guifarro
MF	–	(Chile) Hernán Godoy	Substituted off
FW	–	(Honduras) Óscar Hernández	Substituted off
FW	–	(Brazil) Pedro da Silva
FW	–	(Honduras) Tomás Máximo
Substitutions:
FW	–	(Honduras) Mario Artica	Substituted on
–	–	(Honduras) Pedro Colón	Substituted on
Manager:
(Honduras) Carlos Padilla

GK	–	(Honduras) Roberto Norales
DF	–	(Honduras) Selvin Cárcamo
DF	–	(Honduras) Miguel Matamoros
DF	–	(Honduras) Juan Lanza	Substituted off
DF	–	(Honduras) Juan López
MF	–	(Honduras) Marco Mendoza
MF	–	(Honduras) Ángel Paz
MF	–	(Honduras) Donaldo Rosales	Substituted off
FW	–	(Honduras) Reynaldo Mejía
FW	–	(Honduras) Jorge Urquía
FW	–	(Honduras) Jorge Bran
Substitutions:
–	–	(Honduras) Manuel Williams	Substituted on
FW	–	(Honduras) Rigoberto Gómez	Substituted on
Manager:
(Honduras) José Herrera

- Motagua champions as better regular season record.

== Top scorer ==
- (Honduras) Carlos Alvarado (Vida) with 16 goals

== Squads ==
Atlético Español
(Brazil) Roberto Abrussezze	(Honduras) Egdomilio "Milo" Díaz	(Brazil) Flavio Ortega
Atlético Indio
(Honduras) Ramón Antonio "Pilín" Brand	(Brazil) Espedito Serafín
Lempira de Guaruma
(Honduras) Jairo López Alcerro	(Honduras) Melchor Argeñal	(Honduras) Dagoberto Cubero
(Honduras) César Augusto Dávila Puerto	(Honduras) Robert Anthony "Charola" Gaynor	(Honduras) Amílcar "Mica" López
(Honduras) Samuel de Jesús "Chamel" Tejada	(Honduras) Francisco "Pantera" Velásquez
Marathón
(Honduras) Roberto Bailey	(Honduras) Mario Felipe "Cofra" Caballero Álvarez	(Honduras) Mauro "Nayo" Caballero
(Honduras) Ramón "Moncho" Cano	(Honduras) Arnulfo Echeverría	(Honduras) Alexander "Nina" Guillén
(Honduras) Dennis "Plitis" Lagos	(Honduras) Alberto Mancía	(Honduras) Martín "Piruleta" Rodríguez
(Honduras) Gil "Fátima" Valerio	(Honduras) Allan Ricardo Young
Motagua
(Honduras) Héctor "Chorro" Acosta	(Honduras) Mario Blandón "Tanque" Artica	(Honduras) Marcos Banegas
(Honduras) Nelson Benavídez	(Honduras) Ramón "Poquitito" Carbajal	(Honduras) Ricardo "Catín" Cárdenas
(Honduras) Pedro Colón	(Honduras) José Luis Cruz Figueroa	(Brazil) Pedro Caetano Da Silva
(Brazil) Linauro Di Paula	(Nicaragua) Salvador Dubois Leiva	(Chile) Hernán Godoy
(Honduras) Mariano Godoy	(Honduras) Rubén "Chamaco" Guifarro	(Chile) Alfonso Gutiérrez
(Honduras) Óscar Rolando "Martillo" Hernández	(Honduras) Tomás Máximo	(Honduras) Julio Meza
(Honduras) Alfonso "Foncho" Navarro	(Honduras) Salustio Pacheco	(Honduras) Alberto "Furia" Solís
(Honduras) Arnaldo "Chuluyo" Zelaya
Olimpia
(Honduras) Jorge Alberto "Cejas" Brand Guevara	(Honduras) Fernando "Azulejo" Bulnes	(Honduras) Selvin Cárcamo
(Honduras) Rigoberto "Shula" Gómez Murillo	(Honduras) Juan Isidro "Juanín" Lanza	(Honduras) Juan Ventura "La Gata" López
(Honduras) Miguel Angel "Shinola" Matamoros	(Honduras) Marco Antonio "Tonín" Mendoza	(Honduras) Roberto Crisanto "Manga" Norales
(Honduras) Reynaldo Mejía Ortega	(Honduras) José Estanislao "Tanayo" Ortega	(Honduras) Ángel Ramón "Mon" Paz
(Honduras) Donaldo "Coyoles" Rosales	(Honduras) Raúl Suazo Lagos	(Honduras) Jorge Alberto "Indio" Urquía Elvir
(Honduras) Manuel Candado Williams
Platense
(Honduras) Carlos "Care" Alvarado	(Honduras) Martín Castillo	(Honduras) Norman Castro
(Colombia) Reynaldo Castro Gil	(Honduras) Javier Duarte	(Honduras) Ricardo "Cañón" Fúnez
(Honduras) Luis Alonso Guzmán Velásquez	(Colombia) Oscar Marino Piedrahíta	(Honduras) Jimmy Steward
(Honduras) Modesto Armando "Sargento" Urbina
Real España
(Honduras) Carlos Alberto Acosta "El Indio" Lara	(Costa Rica) Carlos Luis "Macho" Arrieta	(Honduras) José Enrique "Coneja" Cardona
(Honduras) Dolores Edmundo "Lolo" Cruz	(Honduras) Roberto "Campeón" Hidalgo	(Honduras) Mario "Pelola" López
(Honduras) Domingo "Mingo" Ramos	(Honduras) Jacobo Sarmiento	(Honduras) Rigoberto "Aserradero" Velásquez
(Honduras) Jaime Villegas
Victoria
(Honduras) César "Cesarín" Aguirre	(Honduras) René Bernárdez	(Honduras) Carlos Brown
(Honduras) Manuel Bubuch	(Honduras) Luis Bueso	(Honduras) Edgardo Bustillo
(Honduras) José Eduardo Castillo	(Honduras) Terencio Escobar	(Honduras) Gerardo García
(Honduras) Óscar García	(Honduras) Ciriaco Gutiérrez	(Honduras) Salvador Hernández
(Honduras) José Inés Izaguirre	(Honduras) Sergio Jiménez	(Honduras) José Francisco "Jotín" Lanza
(Honduras) Adolfo "Fito" López	(Honduras) Anael "Lito" Martínez	(Honduras) Gilberto Martínez
(Honduras) Rigoberto Martínez	(Honduras) Roberto Martínez	(Honduras) Sergio "Tito" Martínez
(Honduras) Héctor Mejía	(Honduras) Reynaldo Mejía Ortega	(Honduras) Luis Alonso Metzquin
(Honduras) Armando Motiño	(Honduras) Antonio Muñoz	(Honduras) Óscar Muñoz
(Honduras) Alejandro Palacios	(Honduras) Salvador Ramírez	(Honduras) Armando Reyes
(Honduras) Virgilio Rodríguez	(Honduras) Jorge "Chino" Suazo	(Honduras) René "Maravilla" Suazo
(Honduras) Jesús Urbina	(Honduras) Pablo Villegas	(Honduras) Carlos Vilorio
(Honduras) Antonio Zapata	(Honduras) Reynaldo Zúniga
Vida
(Honduras) Carlos Humberto Alvarado Osorto	(Honduras) Manuel Bernárdez Calderón	(Honduras) Arturo Edilson "Junia" Garden
(Honduras) Morris Garden	(Honduras) José López Paz	(Honduras) Marcos Peña
(Honduras) José María "Chema" Salinas

== Known results ==
=== Round 1 ===
Atlético Español	0–3	Vida
		Alvarado

=== Round 4 ===
9 August 1970

España	1–0	Olimpia

San Pedro Sula

=== Round 27 ===
21 March 1971

Motagua	4–0	Marathón
Hernández; Blandón; Godoy

Tegucigalpa

=== Unknown rounds ===
19 July 1970	Marathón	3–0	Platense	San Pedro Sula
				Stadium: Estadio General Francisco Morazán

19 July 1970	Motagua	1–1	Atlético Indio	Tegucigalpa
				Stadium: Estadio Tiburcio Carías Andino

2 August 1970	Motagua	4–2	Victoria	Tegucigalpa
	Blandón da Silva; Godoy; Hernández		Martínez; Lanza	Stadium: Estadio Tiburcio Carías Andino

16 August 1970	España	1–2	Vida	San Pedro Sula
	Sevilla		Alvarado	Stadium: Estadio General Francisco Morazán

23 August 1970

Vida	0–0	Victoria

La Ceiba
23 August 1970

Platense	0–0	Lempira

San Pedro Sula
23 August 1970

España	0–0	Marathón

San Pedro Sula
23 August 1970

Atlético Español	2–0	Atlético Indio

Tegucigalpa
30 August 1970

Olimpia	1–0	Motagua
Paz (?)

Tegucigalpa
6 September 1970

Marathón	2–1	Olimpia

San Pedro Sula
6 September 1970

Motagua	5–0	Atlético Español
da Silva; Blandón

Tegucigalpa
13 September 1970

Olimpia	1–2	Vida
Rosales		Bernárdez; Paz

Tegucigalpa
4 October 1970

Victoria	1–0	Atlético Español

La Ceiba
4 October 1970

Lempira	2–3	Vida

San Pedro Sula
29 November 1970

Olimpia	3–1	Victoria
Urquía; Suazo		Mejía

Tegucigalpa
13 December 1970

Victoria	4–4	Lempira
Aguirre; Suazo		López; Gaynor; Perdomo

La Ceiba
7 February 1971

Lempira	2–1	Victoria
Tejada

San Pedro Sula
21 February 1971

España	0–4	Olimpia

San Pedro Sula
12 March 1971

España	2–1	Platense
Villegas 90'

San Pedro Sula
14 March 1971

Motagua	1–1	Lempira
Godoy		Tejada

Tegucigalpa
14 March 1971

Olimpia	2–1	Vida

Tegucigalpa
10 April 1971

Motagua	3–1	España
Blandón; Guifarro; Godoy		Acosta

Tegucigalpa

España	2–0	Lempira
Greenech; Cruz

San Pedro Sula

Lempira	0–2	España
		Sevilla; Cardona

San Pedro Sula

España	1–0	Lempira
Sarmiento

San Pedro Sula
