= 1972–73 Honduran Liga Nacional =

Liga Nacional
- Season: 1972–73
- Champions: None
- Relegated: None
- CONCACAF Champions' Cup: Olimpia; Vida
- Matches: 45
- Goals: 115 (2.56 per match)
- All statistics correct as of 12 October 1972.

The 1972–73 Honduran Liga Nacional season was expected to be the 8th edition of the Honduran Liga Nacional. However, on 12 August 1972, due to economic problems the tournament was cancelled after nine weeks completed. It's unclear how Club Deportivo Olimpia and C.D.S. Vida obtained berths to the 1973 CONCACAF Champions' Cup.

== 1972–73 teams ==
- Atlético Indio (Tegucigalpa)
- Broncos (Choluteca)
- España (San Pedro Sula)
- Marathón (San Pedro Sula)
- Motagua (Tegucigalpa)
- Olimpia (Tegucigalpa)
- Platense (Puerto Cortés)
- Troya (Tegucigalpa)
- Universidad (Tegucigalpa, promoted)
- Vida (La Ceiba)
- Broncos bought Verdún's franchise

== Regular season ==
=== Standings ===
Pos	Team	Pld	W	D	L	GF	GA	GD	Pts
1	Motagua	9	6	3	0	18	7	+11	15
2	Olimpia	9	5	2	2	13	7	+6	12
3	Vida	9	5	1	3	18	8	+10	11
4	Platense	9	5	1	3	16	7	+9	11
5	España	9	3	4	2	11	8	+3	10
6	Atlético Indio	9	4	2	3	10	13	−3	10
7	Broncos	9	2	3	4	6	9	−3	7
8	Troya	9	2	2	5	6	19	−13	6
9	Universidad	9	2	1	6	7	18	−11	5
10	Marathón	9	1	1	7	10	19	−9	3

- The tournament was canceled after nine rounds.

== Squads ==
Atlético Indio
(Honduras) Amílcar "Verde" Aceituno	(Honduras) Víctor Hugo Álvarez	(Honduras) Luis Brand
(Honduras) Ramón Antonio "Pilín" Brand	(Honduras) Marco Antonio Calderón	(Honduras) Ricardo Calona
(Honduras) Pedro "Poquitito" Carbajal	(Honduras) Miguel Angel Escalante	(Honduras) Jorge "Cruz Azul" Escoto
(Honduras) "Yuyuga" Flores	(Honduras) Joaquín Enrique "Quicón" Fonseca	(Honduras) Francisco "Panchón" Guerra
(Chile) Alfonso "Garrincha" Gutiérrez	(Honduras) Marco Tulio "Coyol" López	(Honduras) Joaquín "Alianza" Maldonado
(Honduras) Carlos Arturo Matute	(Honduras) David Levy McCalla	(Honduras) Aquiles Mendoza
(Honduras) Héctor "Yeto" Montoya	(Honduras) Oscar Nolasco	(Honduras) Roy Posas
(Honduras) Orlando "Calavera" Rodríguez	(Brazil) Expedito Serafín	(Honduras) Jorge Sierra
(Honduras) Edgardo Sosa	(Honduras) Ramón Ugarte
Broncos
(Honduras) Hernán Santiago "Cortés" García Martínez	(Honduras) Adalberto "Chino" Menjívar
España
(Costa Rica) Carlos Luis "Macho" Arrieta	(Honduras) Dagoberto Cubero	(Honduras) Arnulfo Echeverría
(Brazil) Flavio Ortega	(Honduras) José Estanislao "Tanayo" Ortega	(Honduras) Domingo "Mingo" Ramos
(Honduras) Jacobo Sarmiento	(Honduras) Rigoberto "Aserradero" Velásquez	(Honduras) Jaime Villegas
Marathón
(Honduras) Roberto Bailey	(Honduras) Arturo Torres "Pacharaca" Bonilla	(Honduras) Alexander "Nina" Guillén
(Honduras) Alberto Mancía	(Costa Rica) Allard Plummer	(Honduras) Martín "Piruleta" Rodríguez
(Honduras) Gil "Fátima" Valerio	(Honduras) Allan Ricardo Young
Motagua
(Honduras) Marcos Banegas	(Honduras) Nelson Benavídez	(Honduras) José Luis Cruz Figueroa
(Nicaragua) Salvador Dubois Leiva	(Honduras) Óscar Rolando "Martillo" Hernández	(Honduras) Julio Meza
(Honduras) Francisco "Pantera" Velásquez	(Honduras) Héctor "Lin" Zelaya
Olimpia
(Honduras) Arnulfo "Nuco" Aguilar	(Honduras) Óscar Banegas	(Honduras) Jorge Alberto "Cejas" Brand Guevara
(Honduras) Selvin Cárcamo	(Honduras) Domingo "Toncontín" Ferrera	(Honduras) Conrado "Chorotega" Flores
(Honduras) Rigoberto "Shula" Gómez	(Honduras) Juan Isidro "Juanín" Lanza	(Honduras) Mario Mairena
(Honduras) Miguel Angel "Shinola" Matamoros	(Honduras) Reynaldo Mejía Ortega	(Honduras) Marco Antonio "Tonín" Mendoza
(Honduras) Roberto Crisanto "Manga" Norales	(Honduras) Ángel Ramón "Mon" Paz	(Honduras) German Quijano
(Honduras) René "Reno" Rodríguez	(Honduras) Rolando "Piropo" Rodríguez	(Honduras) Samuel Sentini
(Honduras) Raúl Suazo Lagos	(Honduras) Jorge Alberto "Indio" Urquía Elvir	(Honduras) Juan Ventura "Gata" López
(Honduras) Manuel "Candado" Williams
Platense
(Honduras) Carlos "Care" Alvarado	(Honduras) Miguel "Miguelín" Bernárdez
(Honduras) Martín Castillo	(Honduras) Tomás Cedricks Ewens "Quito" Wagner	(Honduras) Luis Alonso Guzmán Velásquez
(Colombia) Óscar Marino Piedrahíta	(Honduras) Jimmy Steward
Troya
(Honduras) Gilberto "Chorro" Acosta	(Honduras) Juan Manuel "Chino" Aguilar	(Honduras) Santiago Anderson
(Brazil) Geraldo Baptista	(Honduras) Jorge Emilio Cabrera	(Honduras) Carlos Cabrera
(Honduras) Domingo "Toncontín" Ferrera	(Colombia) Gerardo García	(Honduras) José Lito Godoy
(Honduras) Edgardo Lagos	(Honduras) Edgardo Lanza	(Honduras) Camilo Mejía
(Honduras) Carlos Ochoa	(Honduras) Domingo "Yuyo" Tróchez
Universidad
(Honduras) Egdomilio "Milo" Díaz	(Honduras) Ramón "Mon" Medina	(Honduras) José Salomón "Turco" Nazzar
Victoria
(Honduras) José Dagoberto Tejeda
Vida
(Honduras) Carlos Humberto Alvarado Osorto	(Honduras) Manuel Bernárdez Calderón	(Honduras) Morris Garden
(Honduras) José López "Rulo" Paz	(Honduras) Marco Antonio Marcos Peña	(Honduras) José María "Chema" Salinas

== Known results ==
3 August 1972

Marathón	0–1	Universidad

San Pedro Sula
20 August 1972

Platense	3–1	Olimpia
Ortega; Alvarado (?)		Gómez

Puerto Cortés
24 August 1972

Marathón	3–1	Troya

San Pedro Sula
10 September 1972

Marathón	2–2	España
Plummer

San Pedro Sula
17 September 1972

Atlético Indio	2–1	Marathón

Tegucigalpa
8 October 1972

Vida	6–0	Troya
Alvarado; Peña

La Ceiba

Olimpia	2–0	Marathón

Tegucigalpa

Olimpia	1–0	España

Olimpia	4–0	Troya

Tegucigalpa

Olimpia	2–1	Vida

Olimpia	2–1	Broncos

Olimpia	1–1	Atlético Indio

Olimpia	0–0	Universidad

Olimpia	0–1	Motagua

Tegucigalpa

Platense	2–0	Marathón

Puerto Cortés

Marathón	1–2	Vida

San Pedro Sula

Motagua	5–2	Marathón

Tegucigalpa

Broncos	2–1	Marathón

Choluteca
