= 1975–76 Honduran Liga Nacional =

Liga Nacional
- Season: 1975–76
- Champions: España (2nd)
- Relegated: Atlántida
- CONCACAF Champions' Cup: España; Olimpia
- Matches: 149
- Goals: 368 (2.47 per match)
- Top goalscorer: López (11)

The 1975–76 Honduran Liga Nacional season was the 10th edition of the Honduran Liga Nacional. The format of the tournament consisted of a three round-robin schedule followed by a 4-team playoff round. C.D. España won the title after defeating Club Deportivo Olimpia in the finals. Both teams qualified to the 1976 CONCACAF Champions' Cup.

== 1975–76 teams ==
- Atlántida (La Ceiba, promoted)
- Broncos (Choluteca)
- España (San Pedro Sula)
- Federal (Tegucigalpa)
- Marathón (San Pedro Sula)
- Motagua (Tegucigalpa)
- Olimpia (Tegucigalpa)
- Platense (Puerto Cortés)
- Universidad (Tegucigalpa)
- Vida (La Ceiba)

== Regular season ==
=== Standings ===
Pos	Team	Pld	W	D	L	GF	GA	GD	Pts	Qualification or relegation
1	Olimpia (Note: Olimpia secured final spot as regular season winner.)	27	14	12	1	35	9	+26	40	Qualified to the Final round (Note: Olimpia, Motagua, España and Universidad qualified to Final round.)
2	Motagua	27	9	14	4	27	18	+9	32	Qualified to the Final round
3	España	27	9	13	5	23	14	+9	31	Qualified to the Final round
4	Universidad	27	9	12	6	24	17	+7	30	Qualified to the Final round
5	Platense	27	9	11	7	28	18	+10	29	
6	Broncos	27	10	9	8	27	24	+3	29	
7	Vida	27	6	12	9	22	32	−10	24	
8	Marathón	27	5	13	9	23	26	−3	23	
9	Federal	27	3	15	9	21	36	−15	21	
10	Atlántida	27	3	5	19	12	48	−36	11	Relegated to Segunda División (Note: Atlántida relegated to second division.)

== Final round ==
=== Cuadrangular standings ===
Pos	Team	Pld	W	D	L	GF	GA	GD	Pts	Qualification or relegation
1	España	6	3	1	2	6	4	+2	7 (Note: España and Motagua played an extra match for final spot on 3 December 1975 in San Pedro Sula, the final result was 0–0 after 120 minutes, España qualified to the final as better goal difference in all rounds.)	Qualified to the Final playoff
2	Motagua	6	2	3	1	5	4	+1	7	Qualified to the Final playoff
3	Universidad	6	2	2	2	5	8	−3	6	
4	Olimpia	6	1	2	3	6	6	0	4	

=== Final ===
1975-12-07

Olimpia	1–1	España
Gómez		Ortega

Estadio Tiburcio Carías Andino, Tegucigalpa
Referee: Julio Mejía

1975-12-14

España	2–0	Olimpia
Ferreira; Yearwood

Estadio Francisco Morazán, San Pedro Sula
Referee: Carlos Roberto Ortiz Pérez

== Top scorer ==
- (Honduras) Marco Tulio "Coyol" López (Olimpia) with 11 goals

== Squads ==
Atlántida
(Honduras) Óscar Acosta	(Honduras) German "Niño" Bernárdez	(Honduras) Arnulfo "Yuyuga" Flores
(Honduras) Eduardo Gámez	(Honduras) Carlos "Papeto" Lobo	(Honduras) Mario "Flecha" López
(Honduras) Camilo Mejía	(Honduras) "Diablo" Ramos	(Honduras) Apolonio Sambulá
(Honduras) Jorge Sierra	(Honduras) Osman Zelaya
Broncos
(Honduras) Hernán Santiago "Cortés" García Martínez	(Honduras) Jorge Alberto "Perro" Gonzáles	(Honduras) "Yeto" Montoya
(Honduras) Jacobo Sarmiento
Real España
(Costa Rica) Carlos Luis "Macho" Arrieta	(Honduras) Julio César "El Tile" Arzú	(Honduras) Jimmy James Bailey
(Honduras) Ramón Cano	(Honduras) José Luis Cruz Figueroa	(Honduras) Arnulfo Echeverría
(Brazil) Alberto Ferreira da Silva	(Honduras) Walter Humberto Jimminson	(Honduras) Roger Macedo
(Honduras) José Estanislao "Tanayo" Ortega	(Honduras) Reynaldo Mejía Ortega	(Honduras) Antonio "Gato" Pavón Molina
(Honduras) José López "Rulo" Paz	(Honduras) Ernesto "Tractor" Ramírez	(Honduras) Gil Josué Rodríguez
(Honduras) Jimmy Steward	(Honduras) Gilberto Gerónimo Yearwood
Federal
(Honduras) José Ernesto "Toto" Cáceres	(Chile) Alfonso "Garrincha" Gutiérrez	(Honduras) Julio Meza
(Colombia) Oscar Teherán
Marathón
(Honduras) Antonio Almendárez	(Honduras) Roberto Bailey	(Honduras) Carlos Banegas
(Honduras) Julio "Ruso" Bonilla	(Honduras) Mario Bonilla	(Honduras) Mauro "Nayo" Caballero
(Honduras) Francisco Castillo	(Honduras) Miguel Castillo	(Costa Rica) Roscoe Charles
(Honduras) Miguel Chavarría	(Honduras) César Augusto "Papi" Dávila Puerto	(Honduras) Antonio "Camalote" Dueñas
(Honduras) Pablo "Payique" Espinoza	(Honduras) Héctor Julián Fiallos	(Honduras) Wilfredo Garay
(Honduras) Exequiel "Estupiñán" García	(Paraguay) Reynaldo González	(Honduras) Bleer Greeneech
(Honduras) Luis Alonso Guzmán Velásquez	(Costa Rica) Óscar McLean	(Honduras) Wilfredo Medina
(Honduras) Adalberto "Chino" Menjívar	(Honduras) Ramón "Albañil" Osorio	(Chile) Andro Piña
(Costa Rica) Allard Plummer	(Chile) Jaime Ramírez Jr.	(Argentina) Daniel Argelio Romero
(Honduras) Eduardo Ruiz	(Honduras) Francisco Ruiz	(Honduras) Rafael "Avioneta" Sauceda
(Honduras) Arturo Torres "Pacharaca" Bonilla	(Honduras) Luis Urbina	(Honduras) Óscar Urbina
(Honduras) Gil "Fátima" Valerio	(Honduras) Allan Ricardo Young	(Honduras) Bertín Zelaya
Motagua
(Honduras) Víctor Hugo Alvarez	(Honduras) Marcos Banegas	(Honduras) Salvador Bernárdez
(Honduras) José María "Chema" Durón	(Honduras) Mariano Godoy	(Honduras) Rubén "Chamaco" Guifarro
(Honduras) Óscar Rolando "Martillo" Hernández	(Nicaragua) Roger Mayorga	(Honduras) Angel Antonio "Toño" Obando
(Honduras) Ronald Quilter	(Honduras) Edgardo Sosa	(Honduras) Rigoberto Sosa
(Honduras) Francisco "Pantera" Velásquez	(Honduras) Héctor "Lin" Zelaya
Olimpia
(Honduras) Ramón Antonio "Pilín" Brand	(Honduras) Selvin Cárcamo	(Honduras) Egdomilio "Milo" Díaz
(Honduras) Rigoberto "Shula" Gómez	(Honduras) Alfredo Hawit Banegas	(Honduras) Marco Tulio "Coyol" López
(Honduras) Marco Antonio "Tonín" Mendoza	(Honduras) Ángel Ramón "Mon" Paz	(Honduras) Samuel Santini
Platense
(Honduras) Alejandro Aguirre	(Honduras) Carlos "Care" Alvarado	(Honduras) Neptaly Argeñal
(Honduras) Rafael Argeñal	(Honduras) Eduardo Castillo	(Honduras) Martín Castillo
(Honduras) "Cacique" Castro	(Honduras) "Rigo" Castro	(Honduras) Ricardo Castro
(Honduras) Jhony Chavarría	(Honduras) Arturo Coto	(Honduras) Tomás Cedricks Ewens "Quito" Wagner
(Honduras) "Cuco" Flores	(Honduras) Manuel de Jesús Fuentes	(Honduras) "Toro" Garay
(Honduras) Rossvelth Garbut	(Honduras) Erasmo "Chícharo" Guerrero	(Honduras) Juan Noyola
(Honduras) Mario Ortega	(Honduras) Arturo Payne	(Colombia) Oscar Piedrahíta
(Honduras) Roberto Rich	(Honduras) Víctor Samuel Rivera	(Chile) Rubén Rodríguez Peña Llantén
(Honduras) Jimmy Steward
Universidad
(Honduras) Roger Macedo	(Honduras) Ramón "Mon" Medina	(Honduras) José Salomón "Turco" Nazzar
(Honduras) Ricardo Nuila	(Honduras) Daniel "Diablo" Sambulá	(Honduras) Roberto Virgilio Santos
Vida
(Honduras) Óscar "Burra" Acosta	(Honduras) César "Cesarín" Aguirre	(Honduras) Carlos Humberto Alvarado Osorto
(Honduras) Manuel Bernárdez Calderón	(Honduras) Peter Buchanan	(Honduras) Jorge Caballero
(Guatemala) Jesús Octavio Cifuentes	(Honduras) Gustavo Adolfo "Gorcha" Collins	(Honduras) Zacarías "Frijolito" Collins
(Honduras) Juan David	(Honduras) Fredy Delgado	(Honduras) Arturo "Junia" Garden
(Honduras) Morris Garden	(Honduras) Ramón Neptally "Liebre" Guardado	(Honduras) Dennis "Bomba" Hinds
(Honduras) Mario McKoy	(Honduras) Matilde Selím Lacayo	(Honduras) Jairo López
(Honduras) José López "Rulo" Paz	(Honduras) Tomás "Tommy" Marshall	(Honduras) Enrique "Palanca" Mendoza
(Honduras) Mario Murillo	(Honduras) Hermenegildo Orellana	(Honduras) Marco Antonio Marcos Peña
(Honduras) Jorge Peralta	(Honduras) Wilfredo "Wil" Rodríguez	(Honduras) José María "Chema" Salinas
(Honduras) Vicente Suazo	(Honduras) Antonio "Danto" Urbina	(Honduras) Edgardo Williams
(Honduras) Osman Zelaya

== Trivia ==
- Atlántida from La Ceiba made only 11 points in 27 games, being this the worst record in Liga Nacional up to date.

== Known results ==
=== Round 1 ===
13 February 1975	Motagua	2–0	Atlántida	Tegucigalpa
CST	Obando; Godoy			Stadium: Estadio Tiburcio Carías Andino

=== Round 11 ===
Platense	–	Olimpia

San Pedro Sula

=== Cuadrangular ===
26 October 1975

España	1–0	Olimpia
Castro

San Pedro Sula
2 November 1975

Motagua	1–1	Olimpia
Obando		López

Tegucigalpa
9 November 1975

Motagua	1–0	España

Tegucigalpa
16 November 1975

Olimpia	0–2	España
		Paz; Lagos

Tegucigalpa
23 November 1975

Olimpia	0–0	Universidad

Tegucigalpa
26 November 1975

España	0–0	Motagua

San Pedro Sula
30 November 1975

Olimpia	1–2	Motagua
Gómez		Hernández; Godoy

San Pedro Sula

Universidad	0–4	Olimpia

=== Final playoff ===
1975-12-03

España	0–0	Motagua

San Pedro Sula

=== Unknown rounds ===
16 February 1975	Olimpia	5–0	Federal	Tegucigalpa
CST				Stadium: Estadio Tiburcio Carías Andino

23 February 1975	Motagua	v	Vida
CST	Obando

23 February 1975	Olimpia	4–1	Broncos	Tegucigalpa
CST	Hawit; Gómez; López; Allen		Fernandes	Stadium: Estadio Tiburcio Carías Andino

9 March 1975	Platense	5–1	Federal	Puerto Cortés
CST			Meza	Stadium: Estadio Excélsior

9 March 1975	Motagua	0–1	España	Tegucigalpa
CST				Stadium: Estadio Tiburcio Carías Andino

16 March 1975	Vida	2–1	Atlántida	La Ceiba
CST	Aguirre; Alvarado		López	Stadium: Estadio Nilmo Edwards

6 April 1975	Marathón	0–1	Olimpia	San Pedro Sula
CST				Stadium: Estadio General Francisco Morazán

10 April 1975	Motagua	v	Federal	Tegucigalpa
CST	Obando			Stadium: Estadio Tiburcio Carías Andino

13 April 1975	Federal	1–1	Universidad	Tegucigalpa
CST				Stadium: Estadio Tiburcio Carías Andino

20 April 1975	Universidad	5–1	Atlántida	Tegucigalpa
CST				Stadium: Estadio Tiburcio Carías Andino

18 May 1975	Atlántida	0–5	Platense	La Ceiba
CST				Stadium: Estadio Nilmo Edwards

18 May 1975	España	4–0	Motagua	San Pedro Sula
CST				Stadium: Estadio General Francisco Morazán

29 June 1975	Universidad	1–0	Marathón	Tegucigalpa
CST	Sambulá			Stadium: Estadio Tiburcio Carías Andino

6 July 1975	Motagua	v	Olimpia	Tegucigalpa
CST	Obando			Stadium: Estadio Tiburcio Carías Andino

13 July 1975	Broncos	0–1	Olimpia	Choluteca
CST				Stadium: Estadio Fausto Flores Lagos

31 July 1975	Universidad	v	Federal
CST

3 August 1975	Marathón	1–1	Atlántida	San Pedro Sula
CST				Stadium: Estadio General Francisco Morazán

17 August 1975	Motagua	v	Atlántida
CST	Obando

24 August 1975	Federal	1–1	Vida	Tegucigalpa
CST				Stadium: Estadio Tiburcio Carías Andino

24 August 1975	Olimpia	0–0	Motagua	Tegucigalpa
CST				Stadium: Estadio Tiburcio Carías Andino

12 October 1975	Broncos	v	Atlántida	Choluteca
CST				Stadium: Estadio Fausto Flores Lagos
Note: Atlántida didn't show up

12 October 1975	Federal	2–0	Platense	Tegucigalpa
CST				Stadium: Estadio Tiburcio Carías Andino

23 October 1975	Vida	2–3	Marathón	La Ceiba; San Pedro Sula
CST	Orellana			Stadium: Estadio Nilmo Edwards; Estadio General Francisco Morazán
Note: Match suspended at 15' in La Ceiba on 19 October. Remaining 75' played 4 days later in San Pedro Sula.

	Vida	1–0	Atlántida	La Ceiba
CST	Aguirre			Stadium: Estadio Nilmo Edwards

	Vida	2–1	Atlántida	La Ceiba
CST	Alvarado; Peralta		Zelaya	Stadium: Estadio Nilmo Edwards

	Marathón	1–2	Atlántida	San Pedro Sula
CST				Stadium: Estadio General Francisco Morazán

	Atlántida	1–0	Motagua	La Ceiba
CST				Stadium: Estadio Nilmo Edwards

	Atlántida	2–0	Federal	La Ceiba
CST				Stadium: Estadio Nilmo Edwards
