= 1969–70 Honduran Liga Nacional =

Liga Nacional
- Season: 1969–70
- Champions: Olimpia (3rd)
- Relegated: Progreso
- CONCACAF Champions' Cup: Olimpia
- Matches: 135
- Goals: 362 (2.68 per match)
- Top goalscorer: Ortega (18)

The 1969–70 Honduran Liga Nacional season was the 5th edition of the Honduran Liga Nacional. The format of the tournament remained the same as the previous season. Club Deportivo Olimpia won the title and qualified to the 1970 CONCACAF Champions' Cup.

== 1969–70 teams ==
- Atlético Indio (Tegucigalpa)
- C.D. España (San Pedro Sula)
- Lempira de Guaruma (La Lima, promoted)
- C.D. Marathón (San Pedro Sula)
- C.D. Motagua (Tegucigalpa)
- C.D. Olimpia (Tegucigalpa)
- C.D. Platense (Puerto Cortés)
- C.D. Progreso (El Progreso)
- C.D. Victoria (La Ceiba)
- C.D.S. Vida (La Ceiba)

== Regular season ==
=== Standings ===
Pos	Team	Pld	W	D	L	GF	GA	GD	Pts	Qualification or relegation
1	Olimpia (Note: Olimpia champions as regular season winner.)	27	16	11	0	38	16	+22	43	Qualified to the 1970 CONCACAF Champions' Cup
2	Motagua	27	13	9	5	38	26	+12	35	
3	Marathón	27	15	4	8	57	40	+17	34	
4	Vida	27	12	4	11	41	36	+5	28	
5	España	27	10	8	9	29	27	+2	28	
6	Platense	27	6	11	10	34	38	−4	23	
7	Atlético Indio	27	8	7	12	30	38	−8	23	
8	Victoria	27	7	6	14	34	51	−17	20	
9	Lempira de Guaruma	27	7	5	15	33	45	−12	19	
10	Progreso	27	5	7	15	28	45	−17	17	Relegated to the Segunda División

== Top scorer ==
- (Brazil) Flavio Ortega (Marathón) with 18 goals

== Squads ==
Atlético Indio
(Honduras) Ramón Antonio "Pilín" Brand
Real España
(Honduras) Carlos Alberto Acosta "El Indio" Lara	(Costa Rica) Carlos Luis "Macho" Arrieta	(Honduras) Dolores Edmundo "Lolo" Cruz
(Honduras) Roberto "Campeón" Hidalgo	(Honduras) Mario "Pelola" López	(Honduras) César Augusto Dávila Puerto
(Honduras) Domingo "Mingo" Ramos	(Honduras) Jacobo Sarmiento	(Honduras) Rigoberto "Aserradero" Velásquez
(Honduras) Jaime Villegas
Lempira de Guaruma
(Honduras) Dagoberto Cubero	(Honduras) Adolfo "Fito" López	(Honduras) Francisco "Pantera" Velásquez
(Honduras) Amílcar "Mica" López
Marathón
(Honduras) Mario Felipe "Cofra" Caballero Álvarez	(Honduras) Mauro "Nayo" Caballero	(Honduras) Arnulfo Echeverría
(Brazil) José Ferreira dos Santos	(Honduras) Alexander "Nina" Guillén	(Honduras) Dennis "Plitis" Lagos
(Brazil) Flavio Ortega	(Honduras) Martín "Piruleta" Rodríguez	(Honduras) Gil "Fátima" Valerio
Motagua
(Brazil) Roberto Abrussezze	(Honduras) Elio Banegas	(Honduras) Marcos Banegas
(Brazil) Geraldo Batista	(Honduras) Nelson Benavídez	(Honduras) Mario Blandón "Tanque" Artica
(Honduras) Federico Budde	(Honduras) Marco Antonio Calderón	(Honduras) Ricardo "Catín" Cárdenas
(Honduras) Jesús Castillo	(Honduras) Juan Manuel Coello	(Honduras) Pedro Colón
(Honduras) José Luis Cruz Figueroa	(Honduras) Egdomilio "Milo" Díaz	(Nicaragua) Salvador Dubois Leiva
(Honduras) Mariano Godoy	(Honduras) Rubén "Chamaco" Guifarro	(Honduras) Alfonso "Garrinchita" Gutiérrez
(Honduras) Óscar Rolando "Martillo" Hernández	(Honduras) Roberto Jérez	(Honduras) Tomás Máximo
(Honduras) Julio Meza	(Honduras) Fermín "Min" Navarro	(Brazil) Giuliano Neto
(Honduras) Edgardo Orellana	(Brazil) Linauro di Paula	(Honduras) Carlos Andrés Sanabria
(Honduras) Alberto "Furia" Solís	(Honduras) Humberto Maximiliano”Piquete Amador”	(Honduras) Lenard Wells
Olimpia
(Honduras) Amílcar "Verde" Aceituno	(Honduras) Arnulfo "Nuco" Aguilar	(Honduras) Juan Manuel "Chino" Aguilar
(Honduras) Jorge Alberto "Cejas" Brand Guevara	(Honduras) Fernando "Azulejo" Bulnes	(Honduras) Selvin Cárcamo
(Honduras) Rafael Dick	(Honduras) Domingo "Toncontín" Ferrera	(Honduras) Conrado "Chorotega" Flores
(Honduras) Rigoberto "Shula" Gómez Murillo	(Honduras) Alexander "Nina" Guillén	(Honduras) Juan Ramón Lagos
(Honduras) Juan Isidro "Juanín" Lanza	(Honduras) Miguel Angel "Shinola" Matamoros	(Honduras) Ramón "Mon" Medina
(Honduras) Marco Antonio "Tonín" Mendoza	(Honduras) Roberto Crisanto "Manga" Norales	(Honduras) José Estanislao "Tanayo" Ortega
(Honduras) Ángel Ramón "Mon" Paz	(Honduras) René Reyes "Reno" Rodríguez	(Honduras) Donaldo "Coyoles" Rosales
(Honduras) Samuel Santini	(Honduras) Carlos "Calistrín" Suazo Lagos	(Honduras) Raúl Suazo Lagos
(Honduras) Jorge Alberto "Indio" Urquía Elvir
Platense
(Honduras) Carlos "Care" Alvarado	(Honduras) Pablo "Chita" Arzú	(Honduras) Martín Castillo
(Honduras) Norman Castro	(Colombia) Reynaldo Castro Gil	(Honduras) Eduardo "Basuka" Flashing
(Honduras) Ricardo "Cañón" Fúnez	(Colombia) Oscar Marino Piedrahíta	(Honduras) Tomás Máximo
(Honduras) Jimmy Steward	(Honduras) Modesto Armando "Sargento" Urbina	(Chile) Alfonso Zamora
Progreso Honduras
(Honduras) Gilberto "Chorro" Acosta	(Honduras) Norman Castro	(Honduras) Jorge "Burro" Deras
(Honduras) Alfredo Doblado	(Honduras) Alfredo Hawit Banegas	(Honduras) José López Paz
(Honduras) David McCalla	(Honduras) Ramón Oviedo	(Honduras) Marcos Peña
(Honduras) Jorge Alberto Suazo Marín	(Honduras) Gil "Fátima" Valerio	(Honduras) Allan Ricardo Young
Victoria
(Honduras) César "Cesarín" Aguirre	(Honduras) René Bernárdez	(Honduras) Carlos Brown
(Honduras) Manuel Bubuch	(Honduras) Luis Bueso	(Honduras) Edgardo Bustillo
(Honduras) José Eduardo Castillo	(Honduras) Terencio Escobar	(Honduras) Gerardo García
(Honduras) Óscar García	(Honduras) Ciriaco Gutiérrez	(Honduras) Salvador Hernández
(Honduras) José Inés Izaguirre	(Honduras) Sergio Jiménez	(Honduras) José Francisco "Jotín" Lanza
(Honduras) Adolfo "Fito" López	(Honduras) Anael "Lito" Martínez	(Honduras) Gilberto Martínez
(Honduras) Rigoberto Martínez	(Honduras) Roberto Martínez	(Honduras) Sergio "Tito" Martínez
(Honduras) Héctor Mejía	(Honduras) Reynaldo Mejía Ortega	(Honduras) Luis Alonso Metzquin
(Honduras) Armando Motiño	(Honduras) Antonio Muñoz	(Honduras) Óscar Muñoz
(Honduras) Alejandro Palacios	(Honduras) Salvador Ramírez	(Honduras) Armando Reyes
(Honduras) Virgilio Rodríguez	(Honduras) Jorge "Chino" Suazo	(Honduras) René "Maravilla" Suazo
(Honduras) Jesús Urbina	(Honduras) Pablo Villegas	(Honduras) Carlos Vilorio
(Honduras) Antonio Zapata	(Honduras) Reynaldo Zúniga
Vida
(Honduras) Carlos Humberto Alvarado Osorto	(Guatemala) Emilio Calderini	(Honduras) Manuel Bernárdez Calderón
(Honduras) Jesús "Pun" Fuentes	(Honduras) Arturo Edilson "Junia" Garden	(Honduras) Morris Garden
(Honduras) José María "Chema" Salinas	(Brazil) Espedito Serafín

== Trivia ==
- Marathón made 57 goals this season, a record that is still intact.
- Honduras changed its name to Progreso.

== Known results ==
=== Round 1 ===
22 June 1969

Olimpia	3–0	Atlético Indio
Aceituno; Paz; Aguilar

Tegucigalpa

=== Round 2 ===
13 July 1969

Vida	1 – 2	Olimpia
Garden		Gómez; Lanza

La Ceiba

=== Round 3 ===
17 August 1969

España	0 – 1	Olimpia
		Suazo

San Pedro Sula

=== Round 4 ===
31 August 1969

Lempira	1 – 1	Olimpia
Cruz		Aceituno

San Pedro Sula

=== Round 5 ===
14 September 1969

Olimpia	3 – 2	Marathón
Urquía; Paz; Aguilar		Cano; Caballero

Tegucigalpa

=== Round 6 ===
18 September 1969

Olimpia	0 – 0	Motagua

Tegucigalpa

=== Round 7 ===
21 September 1969

Progreso	4 – 0	Victoria

San Pedro Sula
21 September 1969

Olimpia	3 – 3	Platense
Paz; Brand; Urquía		Zamora; Castro

Tegucigalpa

=== Round 8 ===
28 September 1969

Progreso	0 – 1	Olimpia
		Paz

San Pedro Sula

=== Round 9 ===
5 October 1969

Vida	2 – 0	Lempira

La Ceiba
5 October 1969

Olimpia	1 – 1	Victoria
Medina		Mejía

Tegucigalpa

=== Round 10 ===
19 October 1969

Victoria	0 – 2	Olimpia
		Urquía

La Ceiba
19 October 1969

España	0 – 2	Platense

San Pedro Sula

=== Round 11 ===
26 October 1969

Platense	1 – 1	Olimpia
Zamora		Rodríguez

San Pedro Sula

=== Round 12 ===
9 November 1969

Olimpia	3 – 0	Progreso
Urquía; Rodríguez

Tegucigalpa

=== Round 13 ===
13 November 1969

Motagua	0 – 1	Olimpia
		Brand

Tegucigalpa

=== Round 14 ===
16 November 1969

Marathón	1 – 2	Olimpia
Ortega		Urquía; Rosales

San Pedro Sula

=== Round 15 ===
23 November 1969

Olimpia	0 – 0	Vida

Tegucigalpa

=== Round 16 ===
11 December 1969

Olimpia	2 – 0	Atlético Indio
Mendoza; Brand

Tegucigalpa

=== Round 17 ===
14 December 1969

Victoria	3 – 5	Motagua
Aguirre; Palacios		Baptista; Artica; Banegas

La Ceiba
14 December 1969

Olimpia	2 – 1	Lempira
Urquía; Brand		López

Tegucigalpa

=== Round 18 ===
21 December 1969

Olimpia	1 – 0	España
Urquía

Tegucigalpa

=== Round 19 ===
18 January 1970

España	1 – 2	Olimpia
Greenech		Brand; Urquía

San Pedro Sula

=== Round 20 ===
25 January 1970

Olimpia	2 – 1	Marathón
Urquía; Brand		Lagos

Tegucigalpa

=== Round 21 ===
1 February 1970

Olimpia	0 – 0	Atlético Indio

Tegucigalpa

=== Round 22 ===
8 February 1970

Marathón	2 – 0	Motagua
Caballero; Ortega

San Pedro Sula
8 February 1970

Olimpia	1 – 1	Platense
Urquía		Castro

Tegucigalpa

=== Round 23 ===
15 February 1970

Olimpia	1 – 1	Motagua
Brand		Artica

Tegucigalpa

=== Round 24 ===
22 February 1970

Vida	0 – 1	Olimpia
		Urquía

La Ceiba

=== Round 25 ===
1 March 1970

Olimpia	0 – 0	Victoria

Tegucigalpa

=== Round 26 ===
8 March 1970

Lempira	1 – 2	Olimpia
Urbina		Mendoza; Aguilar

San Pedro Sula

=== Round 27 ===
15 March 1970

Progreso	0 – 0	Olimpia

San Pedro Sula

=== Unknown rounds ===
29 June 1969

Motagua	1–0	Platense
Hernández

Tegucigalpa
29 March 1970

Lempira	1–2	Progreso
		Peña; López

Marathón	4–3	Vida
Ortega

Atlético Indio	2–3	Platense

Marathón	2–4	Motagua
Echeverría; Lagos		Artica; Hernández; Máximo di Paula

San Pedro Sula

España	2–0	Lempira
Hidalgo; Cruz

San Pedro Sula

Lempira	1–1	España
Peralta		Cruz

San Pedro Sula

España	1–0	Lempira
Hidalgo

San Pedro Sula
