= 1973–74 Honduran Liga Nacional =

Liga Nacional
- Season: 1973–74
- Champions: Motagua (3rd)
- Relegated: Troya
- CONCACAF Champions' Cup: Motagua; Marathón
- Matches: 135
- Goals: 300 (2.22 per match)
- Top goalscorer: Blandón (13); Plummer (13)

The 1973–74 Honduran Liga Nacional season was the 8th edition of the Honduran Liga Nacional. The format of the tournament remained the same as the previous season. C.D. Motagua won the title on 9 September 1973 in the 1–1 away draw against C.D. España and qualified to the 1974 CONCACAF Champions' Cup along with runners-up C.D. Marathón.

== 1973–74 teams ==
- Atlético Indio (Tegucigalpa)
- Broncos (Choluteca)
- España (San Pedro Sula)
- Marathón (San Pedro Sula)
- Motagua (Tegucigalpa)
- Olimpia (Tegucigalpa)
- Platense (Puerto Cortés)
- Troya (Tegucigalpa)
- Universidad (Tegucigalpa)
- Vida (La Ceiba)

== Regular season ==
=== Standings ===
Pos	Team	Pld	W	D	L	GF	GA	GD	Pts	Qualification or relegation
1	Motagua (Note: Motagua 1973–74 champions.)	27	13	13	1	39	15	+24	39	Qualified to the 1974 CONCACAF Champions' Cup
2	Marathón (Note: Marathón runner-up.)	27	12	13	2	39	24	+15	37	Qualified to the 1974 CONCACAF Champions' Cup
3	Olimpia	27	10	12	5	37	24	+13	32	
4	España	27	11	9	7	35	24	+11	31	
5	Vida	27	8	11	8	25	27	−2	27	
6	Platense	27	9	8	10	30	28	+2	26	
7	Universidad	27	8	9	10	26	28	−2	25	
8	Atlético Indio	27	7	11	9	26	29	−3	25	
9	Broncos	27	6	6	15	27	51	−24	18	
10	Troya	27	3	4	20	16	50	−34	10	Relegated to Segunda División (Note: Troya relegated.)

== Top scorers ==
- (Honduras) Mario Blandón Artica (Motagua) with 13 goals
- (Costa Rica) Allard Plummer (Marathón) with 13 goals

== Squads ==
Atlético Indio
(Honduras) Amílcar "Verde" Aceituno	(Honduras) Víctor Hugo Álvarez	(Honduras) Luis Brand
(Honduras) Ramón Antonio "Pilín" Brand	(Honduras) Marco Antonio Calderón	(Honduras) Ricardo Calona
(Honduras) Pedro "Poquitito" Carbajal	(Honduras) Miguel Angel Escalante	(Honduras) Jorge "Cruz Azul" Escoto
(Honduras) "Yuyuga" Flores	(Honduras) Joaquín Enrique "Quicón" Fonseca	(Honduras) Francisco "Panchón" Guerra
(Chile) Alfonso "Garrincha" Gutiérrez	(Honduras) Marco Tulio "Coyol" López	(Honduras) Joaquín "Alianza" Maldonado
(Honduras) Carlos Arturo Matute	(Honduras) David Levy McCalla	(Honduras) Aquiles Mendoza
(Honduras) Héctor "Yeto" Montoya	(Honduras) Oscar Nolasco	(Honduras) Roy Posas
(Honduras) Orlando "Calavera" Rodríguez	(Brazil) Expedito Serafín	(Honduras) Jorge Sierra
(Honduras) Edgardo Sosa	(Honduras) Ramón Ugarte
Broncos
(Honduras) "Coquí" Berríos	(Honduras) Hernán Santiago "Cortés" García Martínez	(Honduras) Jorge Alberto "Perro" González
(Honduras) Adalberto "Chino" Menjívar
España
(Honduras) "Mozambique" Alvarez	(Costa Rica) Carlos Luis "Macho" Arrieta	(Honduras) Julio César "El Tile" Arzú
(Honduras) "Roby" Arzú	(Honduras) Dagoberto Cubero	(Honduras) César Augusto Dávila Puerto
(Brazil) Linauro Di Paula	(Honduras) Arnulfo Echeverría	(Brazil) Flavio Ortega
(Honduras) José Estanislao "Tanayo" Ortega	(Honduras) Antonio "Gato" Pavón Molina	(Honduras) Domingo "Mingo" Ramos
(Honduras) Gil Rodríguez	(Honduras) Jacobo Sarmiento	(Honduras) Rigoberto "Aserradero" Velásquez
(Honduras) Jaime Villegas
Marathón
(Honduras) Roberto Bailey	(Honduras) Ramón Cano	(Honduras) Alexander "Nina" Guillén
(Honduras) Alberto Mancía	(Honduras) Wilfredo Medina	(Costa Rica) Allard Plummer
(Honduras) Martín "Piruleta" Rodríguez	(Honduras) Arturo Torres "Pacharaca" Bonilla	(Honduras) Gil "Fátima" Valerio
(Honduras) Allan Ricardo Young
Motagua
(Honduras) Marcos Banegas	(Brazil) Adilson Batista	(Honduras) Nelson Benavídez
(Honduras) Salvador "Pichini" Bernárdez	(Honduras) Mario Blandón "Tanque" Artica	(Honduras) José Luis Cruz Figueroa
(Nicaragua) Salvador Dubois Leiva	(Honduras) José María "Chema" Durón	(Honduras) Mariano Godoy
(Honduras) Rubén "Chamaco" Guifarro	(Chile) Alfonso "Garrinchita" Gutiérrez	(Honduras) Óscar Rolando "Martillo" Hernández
(Nicaragua) Roger Mayorga	(Honduras) Julio Meza	(Honduras) Angel Antonio "Toño" Obando
(Honduras) Ronald Quilter	(Honduras) Rigoberto Sosa	(Honduras) Francisco "Pantera" Velásquez
(Honduras) Arnaldo "Chuluyo" Zelaya	(Honduras) Héctor "Lin" Zelaya
Olimpia
(Honduras) Selvin Cárcamo	(Honduras) Miguel Angel "Shinola" Matamoros	(Honduras) Reynaldo Mejía Ortega
(Honduras) Marco Antonio "Tonín" Mendoza	(Honduras) Ángel Ramón "Mon" Paz	(Honduras) Raúl Suazo Lagos
(Honduras) Jorge Alberto "Indio" Urquía Elvir	(Honduras) Samuel Sentini
Platense
(Honduras) Carlos "Care" Alvarado	(Honduras) Miguel "Miguelín" Bernárdez	(Honduras) Martín Castillo
(Honduras) Tomás Cedricks Ewens "Quito" Wagner	(Honduras) Manuel de Jesús Fuentes	(Honduras) Luis Alonso Guzmán Velásquez
(Honduras) Mario Ortega	(Colombia) Oscar Marino Piedrahíta	(Honduras) Jimmy Steward
Troya
(Brazil) Geraldo Baptista
Universidad
(Honduras) Egdomilio "Milo" Díaz	(Honduras) Roger Macedo	(Honduras) Ramón "Mon" Medina
(Honduras) José Salomón "Turco" Nazzar
Vida
(Honduras) Óscar "Burra" Acosta	(Honduras) César "Cesarín" Aguirre	(Honduras) Carlos Humberto Alvarado Osorto
(Honduras) Manuel Bernárdez Calderón	(Honduras) Peter Buchanan	(Honduras) Jorge Caballero
(Guatemala) Jesús Octavio Cifuentes	(Honduras) Gustavo Adolfo "Gorcha" Collins	(Honduras) Zacarías "Frijolito" Collins
(Honduras) Juan David	(Honduras) Fredy Delgado	(Honduras) Arturo "Junia" Garden
(Honduras) Morris Garden	(Honduras) Ramón Neptally "Liebre" Guardado	(Honduras) Dennis "Bomba" Hinds
(Honduras) Matilde Selím Lacayo	(Honduras) Jairo López	(Honduras) José López "Rulo" Paz
(Honduras) Tomás "Tommy" Marshall	(Honduras) Mario McKoy	(Honduras) Enrique "Palanca" Mendoza
(Honduras) Mario Murillo	(Honduras) Hermenegildo Orellana	(Honduras) Marco Antonio Marcos Peña
(Honduras) Jorge Peralta	(Honduras) Wilfredo "Wil" Rodríguez	(Honduras) José María "Chema" Salinas
(Honduras) Vicente Suazo	(Honduras) Antonio "Danto" Urbina	(Honduras) Edgardo Williams
(Honduras) Osman Zelaya

== Known results ==
=== Round 1 ===
14 January 1973

Broncos	3–4	Universidad

Choluteca
14 January 1973

Platense	2–4	España
Bernárdez

Puerto Cortés

=== Round 6 ===
25 February 1973

Olimpia	2–1	Motagua
Rodríguez; Brand		Baptista

Tegucigalpa

=== Round 20 ===
9 August 1973

Marathón	1–2	Platense

San Pedro Sula

=== Unknown rounds ===
21 January 1973

Motagua	5–0	Broncos

Tegucigalpa
3 February 1973

Vida	–	Universidad
Garden

15 February 1973

Olimpia	–	Universidad

Tegucigalpa
1 March 1973

España	3–2	Broncos

San Pedro Sula
18 March 1973

España	2–1	Olimpia

San Pedro Sula
1 April 1973

Marathón	2–2	Olimpia

San Pedro Sula
8 April 1973

Platense	1–0	Olimpia

Puerto Cortés
15 April 1973

España	0–0	Motagua

San Pedro Sula
29 April 1973

Olimpia	1–1	Atlético Indio

Tegucigalpa
13 May 1973

Broncos	1–0	Olimpia

Choluteca
20 May 1973

Olimpia	1–1	Motagua

Tegucigalpa
8 July 1973

Olimpia	1–1	España

Tegucigalpa
12 July 1973

Olimpia	1–1	Universidad
Gómez		Netto

Tegucigalpa
15 July 1973

Olimpia	0–0	Marathón

Tegucigalpa
20 July 1973

Motagua	2–0	España
Guifarro; Blandón

Tegucigalpa
22 July 1973

Olimpia	1–1	Platense

Tegucigalpa
29 July 1973

Olimpia	5–0	Troya

Tegucigalpa
5 August 1973

Olimpia	2–1	Broncos
Rodríguez; Banegas		Portillo

Tegucigalpa
12 August 1973

Marathón	1–0	Olimpia
Lagos

San Pedro Sula
29 August 1973

Motagua	2–0	Troya
Batista; Durón

Tegucigalpa
9 September 1973

España	1–1	Motagua
Ortega		Hernández

San Pedro Sula
13 September 1973

Motagua	1–1	Broncos

Tegucigalpa
16 September 1973

Olimpia	0–0	España

Tegucigalpa
29 September 1973

Olimpia	5–0	Troya

Tegucigalpa

Olimpia	1–0	Broncos

Marathón	2–2	España

San Pedro Sula
