= 1967–68 Honduran Liga Nacional =

Liga Nacional
- Season: 1967–68
- Champions: Olimpia (2nd)
- Relegated: Club Deportivo San Pedro
- CONCACAF Champions' Cup: Olimpia
- Matches: 91
- Goals: 257 (2.82 per match)
- Top goalscorer: Garden (13)

The 1967–68 Honduran Liga Nacional season was the 3rd edition of the Honduran Liga Nacional. The format of the tournament remained the same as the previous season. Club Deportivo Olimpia won the title and qualified to the 1968 CONCACAF Champions' Cup.

== 1967–68 teams ==
- C.D. Atlético Español (Tegucigalpa)
- Atlético Indio (Tegucigalpa, promoted)
- C.D. España (San Pedro Sula)
- C.D. Honduras (El Progreso)
- C.D. Marathón (San Pedro Sula)
- C.D. Motagua (Tegucigalpa)
- C.D. Olimpia (Tegucigalpa)
- C.D. Platense (Puerto Cortés)
- C.D. San Pedro (San Pedro Sula)
- C.D.S. Vida (La Ceiba)

== Regular season ==
=== Standings ===
Pos	Team	Pld	W	D	L	GF	GA	GD	Pts	Qualification or relegation
1	Olimpia (Note: Olimpia champions as regular season winner.)	18	10	7	1	29	11	+18	27	Qualified to the 1968 CONCACAF Champions' Cup
2	Marathón	18	9	4	5	21	22	−1	22	
3	Honduras	18	8	4	6	31	23	+8	20	
4	Vida	18	8	3	7	31	28	+3	19	
5	Platense	18	6	7	5	21	20	+1	19	
6	Motagua	18	6	5	7	22	21	+1	17	
7	España	18	5	6	7	32	32	0	16	
8	Atlético Indio	18	5	6	7	21	28	−7	16	
9	Atlético Español	18	3	6	9	22	30	−8	12	To Relegation playoff (Note: Relegation playoff: Atlético Español 3–2 San Pedro. San Pedro relegated to 1968–69 Honduran Segunda División)
10	Club San Pedro	18	3	6	9	22	37	−15	12	To Relegation playoff

== Top scorer ==
- (Honduras) Junia Garden (Vida) with 13 goals

== Squads ==
Atlético Español
(Honduras) Egdomilio "Milo" Díaz	(Honduras) Héctor Salvador "Chava" Reyes
Atlético Indio
(Honduras) Jorge Alberto "Indio" Urquía Elvir	(Argentina) Gustavo Venegas	(Honduras) Jorge Alberto "Cejas" Brand Guevara
España
(Honduras) Mariano Aguiluz	(Honduras) Carlos Alberto Acosta "El Indio" Lara	(Honduras) Vidal Canales
(Argentina) Miguel Rojas	(Honduras) Dolores Edmundo "Lolo" Cruz	(Honduras) René "Pelón" Orellana
(Argentina) Pedro Roberto Rivas	(Honduras) Carlos Francisco "Chico Chico" Handal	(Honduras) Raúl "Ratabú" Peri
(Honduras) Isidro Ávila Colón
Honduras
(Honduras) Pedro Deras	(Honduras) David McCalla	(Honduras) Jacobo Sarmiento
(Colombia) Reynaldo Castro Gil	(Colombia) Óscar Marino Piedrahíta	(Honduras) Jorge Alberto Suazo Marín
(Honduras) Marcos Peña	(Honduras) Óscar Bustamante	(Honduras) Domingo "Mingo" Ramos
Marathón
(Honduras) Alexander "Nina" Guillén	(Honduras) Martín "Piruleta" Rodríguez	(Honduras) Julio César "Cucaracha" Fonseca
(Honduras) Gil "Fátima" Valerio	(Honduras) Mario Felipe "Cofra" Caballero Álvarez	(Honduras) José Shubert
Motagua
(Brazil) Roberto Abrussezze	(Honduras) Elio Banegas	(Honduras) Marcos Banegas
(Honduras) Nelson Benavídez	(Honduras) Roberto Benegas	(Brazil) Geraldo Baptista
(Honduras) Jorge "Coqui" Berríos	(Honduras) Carbajal	(Honduras) Amado Castillo
(Honduras) Jesús Castillo	(Honduras) Pedro Colón	(Nicaragua) Salvador Dubois Leiva
(Honduras) Francisco "Panchón" Guerra	(Honduras) Rubén Guifarro	(Honduras) Nelson Jeréz
(Honduras) Roberto Jeréz	(Honduras) Julio Meza	(Honduras) Alfonso “Foncho” Navarro
(Honduras) Fermín "Min" Navarro	(Honduras) Óscar Nolasco	(Honduras) Marcio Ramos
(Honduras) Lenard Wells
Olimpia
(Honduras) "Coco" Zaldivar	(Honduras) Donaldo "Coyoles" Rosales	(Honduras) Roberto Crisanto "Manga" Norales
(Honduras) Raúl Suazo Lagos	(Honduras) René "Reno" Rodríguez	(Honduras) "Pipe" Barahona
(Honduras) Will García	(Honduras) "Leque" Meza	(Honduras) Miguel Angel "Shinola" Matamoros
(Honduras) Conrado "Chorotega" Flores	(Honduras) Selvin Cárcamo	(Honduras) Jorge Alberto "Indio" Urquía Elvir
(Honduras) José Estanislao "Tanayo" Ortega	(Honduras) Domingo "Toncontín" Ferrera	(Honduras) Rigoberto "Shula" Gómez
(Costa Rica) Walter Pearson	(Honduras) Carlos "Calistrín" Suazo Lagos	(Honduras) "Candado" Williams
(Honduras) "Lunarejo" Ramírez	(Honduras) Juan Isidro "Juanín" Lanza	(Honduras) Juan Ventura "Gata" López
(Honduras) Ángel "Mon" Paz	(Honduras) Reynaldo Mejía	(Honduras) Rafael Sauceda
(Honduras) Marco Antonio "Tonín" Mendoza
Platense
(Honduras) Jimmy Steward	(Honduras) Modesto Armando "Sargento" Urbina	(Honduras) Martín Castillo
(Honduras) Carlos "Care" Alvarado	(Honduras) Eduardo "Basuka" Flashing	(Honduras) Tomás Máximo
(Honduras) Ricardo "Cañón" Fúnez	(Honduras) Pablo "Chita" Arzú
Club Deportivo San Pedro
(Honduras) Víctor Henderson	(Honduras) Héctor Castro	(Honduras) Astor Perdomo
(Honduras) Leonardo "Guembo" Vásquez	(Honduras) Román Hernández	(Honduras) Carlos "Calín" Cobos
(Honduras) Víctor Castro	(Honduras) Luis Alonso Metzgen	(Honduras) Ricardo Montalván
(Honduras) Mario "Bulla" Tróchez	(Honduras) Israel "Gato" Juárez	(Honduras) Santiago Rodríguez
(Honduras) Salvador Azcúnaga	(Honduras) Getulio Millares	(Honduras) Miguel "Pelo" Pavón
(Honduras) Adalberto "Chino" Menjívar	(Honduras) Enrique "Quique" Grey Fúnez
Vida
(Honduras) Arturo Edilson "Junia" Garden	(Honduras) Selvin Cárcamo	(Honduras) Jesús "Pun" Fuentes
(Honduras) José María "Chema" Salinas	(Honduras) Morris Garden	(Honduras) Alberto "Campeón" Amaya
(Honduras) Cristóbal "Craka" Brooks
