= 1968–69 Honduran Liga Nacional =

Liga Nacional
- Season: 1968–69
- Champions: Motagua (1st)
- Relegated: Atlético Español
- CONCACAF Champions' Cup: Motagua
- Matches: 135
- Goals: 344 (2.55 per match)
- Top goalscorer: Abrussezze (16)

The 1968–69 Honduran Liga Nacional season was the 4th edition of the Honduran Liga Nacional. The format of the tournament consisted of a three round-robin schedule. C.D. Motagua won the title and qualified to the 1969 CONCACAF Champions' Cup.

== 1968–69 teams ==
- C.D. Atlético Español (Tegucigalpa)
- Atlético Indio (Tegucigalpa)
- C.D. España (San Pedro Sula)
- C.D. Honduras (El Progreso)
- C.D. Marathón (San Pedro Sula)
- C.D. Motagua (Tegucigalpa)
- C.D. Olimpia (Tegucigalpa)
- C.D. Platense (Puerto Cortés)
- C.D. Victoria (La Ceiba, promoted)
- C.D.S. Vida (La Ceiba)

== Regular season ==
=== Standings ===
Pos	Team	Pld	W	D	L	GF	GA	GD	Pts	Qualification or relegation
1	Motagua (Note: Motagua champions as regular season winner.) (C)	27	17	5	5	45	23	+22	39	Qualified to the 1969 CONCACAF Champions' Cup
2	Olimpia (Note: Olimpia runner-up as finishing second.)	27	14	8	5	45	20	+25	36	
3	Platense	27	15	6	6	40	21	+19	36	
4	Atlético Indio	27	12	10	5	34	24	+10	34	
5	España	27	9	7	11	37	30	+7	25	
6	Marathón	27	9	7	11	40	41	−1	25	
7	Victoria	27	8	5	14	33	44	−11	21	
8	Vida	27	6	9	12	31	47	−16	21	
9	Honduras	27	5	8	14	20	53	−33	18	
10	Atlético Español (R)	27	3	9	15	19	41	−22	15	Relegated to the Segunda División

(C) Champions; (R) Relegated
Notes:

1968–69 Liga Nacional champion

1st title

== Top scorer ==
- (Brazil) Roberto Abrussezze (Motagua) with 16 goals

== Squads ==
Atlético Español
(Honduras) Fernando "Azulejo" Bulnes	(Honduras) Egdomilio "Milo" Díaz	(Honduras) Héctor Salvador "Chava" Reyes
Atlético Indio
(Honduras) Jorge Alberto "Indio" Urquía Elvir	(Honduras) Ramón Antonio "Pilín" Brand	(Honduras) Jorge Alberto "Cejas" Brand Guevara
Real España
(Costa Rica) Carlos Luis "Macho" Arrieta	(Honduras) Carlos Alberto Acosta "El Indio" Lara	(Honduras) Carlos Francisco "Chico Chico" Handal
(Honduras) Dolores Edmundo "Lolo" Cruz	(Honduras) Camilo jerez	(Honduras) Arturo Edilson "Junia" Garden
(Honduras) Domingo "Mingo" Ramos	(Honduras) Jacobo Sarmiento	(Honduras) Jaime Villegas
(Honduras) Roberto "Campeón" Hidalgo	(Honduras) René "Pelón" Orellana	(Honduras) Rigoberto "Aserradero" Velásquez
Honduras
(Honduras) Alfredo Hawit Banegas	(Honduras) Jorge Alberto Suazo Marín	(Honduras) Óscar Bustamante
(Honduras) Allan Ricardo Young	(Honduras) Marcos Peña	(Honduras) Pedro Deras
(Brazil) Espedito Serafín	(Honduras) José López Paz
Marathón
(Honduras) Martín "Piruleta" Rodríguez	(Honduras) "Burro" Deras	(Honduras) René Rodríguez
(Honduras) Alexander "Nina" Guillén	(Honduras) Shuberty "Nel" Castillo	(Honduras) Enrique "Quique" Grey Fúnez
(Honduras) Ramón Cano	(Honduras) Gil "Fátima" Valerio	(Honduras) Mario Felipe "Cofra" Caballero Álvarez
(Brazil) Flavio Ortega	(Brazil) Clarival Oliveira	(Honduras) José Shubert
Motagua
(Nicaragua) Salvador Dubois Leiva	(Honduras) Lenard Wells	(Honduras) Marcos Banegas
(Honduras) Roberto Jérez	(Brazil) Roberto Abrussezze	(Brazil) Geraldo Baptista
(Honduras) Pedro Colón	(Honduras) Fermín "Min" Navarro	(Honduras) Óscar Rolando "Martillo" Hernández
(Honduras) Ricardo “Catín” Cárdenas	(Brazil) Ado Baptista	(Honduras) Nelson Benavídez
(Honduras) Julio Meza	(Honduras) Alfonso “Foncho” Navarro	(Brazil) Yoponón de Souza
(Honduras) José Castillo	(Honduras) Rubén Guifarro	(Honduras) Mario Blandón "Tanque" Artica
(Honduras) Mariano Godoy	(Honduras) Marco Tulio González	(Honduras) Juan Ramos
(Honduras) Carlos Díaz	(Brazil) Pedro Caetano da Silva	(Honduras) Humberto Maximiliano ”Piquete Amador”
Olimpia
(Honduras) Juan José "Chino" Aguilar	(Honduras) Juan Andino	(Honduras) Domingo "Toncontín" Ferrera
(Honduras) José Estanislao "Tanayo" Ortega	(Honduras) René Reyes "Reno" Rodríguez	(Honduras) Juan Ramón Lagos
(Honduras) Raúl Suazo Lagos	(Honduras) Conrado "Chorotega" Flores	(Honduras) Rigoberto "Shula" Gómez Murillo
(Honduras) Donaldo "Coyoles" Rosales	(Honduras) Selvin Cárcamo	(Honduras) Miguel Angel "Shinola" Matamoros
(Honduras) Carlos "Calistrín" Suazo Lagos	(Honduras) Marco Antonio "Tonín" Mendoza	(Honduras) Jorge Alberto "Indio" Urquía Elvir
Platense
(Honduras) Carlos "Care" Alvarado	(Colombia) Reynaldo Castro Gil	(Honduras) Eduardo "Basuka" Flashing
(Chile) Alfonso Zamora	(Honduras) Tomás Máximo	(Honduras) Ricardo "Cañón" Fúnez
(Honduras) Jimmy Steward	(Honduras) Modesto Armando "Sargento" Urbina	(Honduras) Norman Castro
(Colombia) Óscar Marino Piedrahita	(Honduras) Martín Castillo	(Honduras) Pablo "Chita" Arzú
Victoria
(Honduras) Terencio Escobar	(Honduras) José Eduardo Castillo	(Honduras) Reynaldo Mejía Ortega
(Honduras) Anael "Lito" Martínez	(Honduras) Luis Alonso Metzquin	(Honduras) Reynaldo Zúniga
(Honduras) Antonio Muñoz	(Honduras) Carlos Vilorio	(Honduras) Salvador Hernández
(Honduras) Edgardo Bustillo	(Honduras) César "Cesarín" Aguirre	(Honduras) Salvador Ramírez
(Honduras) Roberto Martínez	(Honduras) Óscar García	(Honduras) Antonio Zapata
(Honduras) Luis Bueso	(Honduras) Sergio Jiménez	(Honduras) René "Maravilla" Suazo
(Honduras) Gerardo García	(Honduras) José Francisco "Jotín" Lanza	(Honduras) Gilberto Martínez
(Honduras) Adolfo "Fito" López	(Honduras) Óscar Muñoz	(Honduras) Rigoberto Martínez
(Honduras) Alejandro Palacios	(Honduras) Héctor Mejía	(Honduras) Manuel Bubuch
(Honduras) Sergio "Tito" Martínez	(Honduras) Virgilio Rodríguez	(Honduras) Ciriaco Gutiérrez
(Honduras) José Inés Izaguirre	(Honduras) Armando Motiño	(Honduras) Pablo Villegas
(Honduras) Jesús Urbina	(Honduras) Armando Reyes	(Honduras) Carlos Brown
(Honduras) Jorge "Chino" Suazo	(Honduras) René Bernárdez
Vida
(Honduras) Carlos Humberto Alvarado Osorto	(Honduras) Gustavo Adolfo "Gorsha" Collins	(Honduras) Óscar Banegas
(Honduras) Mario Murillo	(Honduras) Arnaldo "Chuluyo" Zelaya	(Honduras) "Yoyu" Puerto
(Honduras) Alberto "Campeón" Amaya	(Honduras) "Rebelde" Rodríguez	(Honduras) Cristóbal "Craka" Brooks
(Honduras) Jesús "Pun" Fuentes	(Honduras) Gustavo Antonio "Danto" Urbina	(Honduras) Morris Garden
(Honduras) José María "Chema" Salinas
