= Miguel Ángel Matamoros =

Honduran footballer (born 1949)

Personal information
- Full name: Miguel Ángel Matamoros Morales
- Date of birth: 10 May 1949 (age 77)
- Place of birth: Amapala, Valle, Honduras
- Position: Defender

Senior career*
Years	Team	Apps	(Gls)
1966–1973	Olimpia		
1974–1977	Mallorca	36	(0)

International career
1969–1973	Honduras	3	(0)
1972	CONCACAF	3	(0)
- * Club domestic league appearances and goals

Miguel Ángel Matamoros Morales (born 10 May 1949) is a retired Honduran footballer. Nicknamed "Shinola", he played for Olimpia within the Liga Nacional de Fútbol de Honduras and for Mallorca within the Tercera División de España throughout the 1970s. He also represented Honduras for the 1971 and 1973 CONCACAF Championships.

== Club career ==
Matamoros made his debut during the 1966–67 Honduran Liga Nacional for Olimpia, being part of the winning squad that helped the club earn their 1st ever title with this being repeated in the very following 1967–69 Honduran Liga Nacional. This rate of success would continue into the early 1970s as the club would win the 1969–70 and 1970–71 Honduran Liga Nacional as well as winning the 1972 CONCACAF Champions' Cup. In 1974, Matamoros was sought by Spanish side Mallorca to play for the upcoming 1974–75 Segunda División. Despite the club signing various foreign players in an attempt to escape their near relegation in the last season, ultimately found themselves relegated. Beginning in the 1975–76 Tercera División, Matamoros played for the following two seasons until retiring in 1977 with 36 appearances.

== International career ==
Matamoros was first called up to represent Honduras for the 1970 FIFA World Cup qualifiers, notably participating in the games against El Salvador that would culminate in the Football War. He was then called up to represent Honduras as the delegations captain for the 1971 CONCACAF Championship. He made his final international appearances during the following 1973 CONCACAF Championship. He also represented a united CONCACAF team for the Brazil Independence Cup that primarily consisted of both Honduran and Haitian footballers.

== Personal life ==
Following his retirement, Matamoros chose to stay in the city of Mallorca, starting his own family there and occasionally visiting his home country of Honduras.
