= Selvin Cárcamo =

Honduran footballer (born 1949)

Personal information
- Full name: Selvin Nemesio Cárcamo Sandoval
- Date of birth: 25 May 1949 (age 77)
- Place of birth: Olanchito, Yoro, Honduras
- Position: Defender

Senior career*
Years	Team	Apps	(Gls)
1967–1968	Vida	4	(0)
1968–1978	Olimpia	178	(3)

International career
1971–1973	Honduras	3	(0)
- * Club domestic league appearances and goals

Selvin Nemesio Cárcamo Sandoval (born 25 May 1949) is a retired Honduran footballer. He played as a defender for Olimpia throughout the 1970s, winning several titles with the club. He also represented Honduras internationally for the 1971 and 1973 CONCACAF Championships.

== Club career ==
Cárcamo made his debut during the 1966–67 Honduran Liga Nacional for Vida, only making 4 appearances throughout his debut season. This lack of participation resulted in him transferring over to Olimpia where he went on to consistently find a place within the starting XI of the club for the remainder of the decade as well as into the 1970s. His debut season with Olimpia saw him score two goals against his former club of Vida as well as against Atlético Indio as the club achieved runners-up. His most successful season came during the emergence of the 1970s through the 1969–70 Honduran Liga Nacional where after achieving 16 victories and 11 draws, saw Cárcamo be part of the undefeated squad for that season. Following narrowly losing to Motagua in the following 1970–71 Honduran Liga Nacional, bounced back in the 1971–72 Honduran Liga Nacional with Cárcamo achieving his second national title and later won the 1972 CONCACAF Champions' Cup that same season. He was also part of the squad that played in a friendly against Santos on 15 February 1972 that ended in a 0–0 draw. The 1973–74 Honduran Liga Nacional also saw him score his final goal against Broncos de Choluteca. He retired following being part of the winning squad for the 1977–78 Honduran Liga Nacional, making 178 total domestic appearances throughout his entire career.

== International career ==
Cárcamo was first called up as a part of the preliminary Honduran roster for the 1971 CONCACAF Championship and later managed to be a part of the final squad. He had a far more significant role through the 1973 CONCACAF Championship as during the second leg match against Costa Rica during the qualifiers, accidentally scored an own goal that nearly cost Honduras the qualification. He later went on to appear in the final tournament, only making a single appearance in the opening match against Guatemala.
