= Lempira =

Lempira may refer to:

- Lempira (Lenca ruler) (died 1537), 16th century leader of the Lenca peoples of Central America, who led local resistance against the Spanish conquistadores
- Honduran lempira, unit of currency
- Puerto Lempira, the capital of the Honduran department of Gracias a Dios
- Lempira Department, the Honduran political division
- Lempira F.C., a Honduran football club
