= Reynaldo Mejía =

Honduran footballer (born 1950)

Personal information
- Full name: Reynaldo Mejía Ortega
- Date of birth: 29 July 1946 (age 80)
- Place of birth: La Ceiba, Atlántida, Honduras
- Position: Forward

Senior career*
Years	Team	Apps	(Gls)
1965–1970	Victoria	50	(26)
1970–1975	Olimpia	105	(38)
1975–1978	Real España	59	(10)
1978–1980	Victoria	26	(7)

International career
1968–1973	Honduras		
- * Club domestic league appearances and goals

Reynaldo Mejía Ortega (born 29 July 1946) is a retired Honduran footballer. Nicknamed "El Perro del Área", he played as a forward for Victoria, Olimpia and Real España throughout the late 1960s and 1970s. He also represented Honduras internationally for the 1973 CONCACAF Championship.

== Club career ==
Growing up in La Ceiba, Mejía took up football after a family member invited him to play one day which inspired him to make his professional debut for Victoria for the inaugural 1965–66 Honduran Liga Nacional. He wouldn't score his first goal until the 1968–69 Honduran Liga Nacional where he scored in the 3–2 victory against Atlético Español on 12 May 1969. He later transferred to Olimpia though this decision was met with controversy as Mejía recalled several of their fans insulting him upon his first few games. Nevertheless, his second season with the club saw him win his first national title through the victory at the 1971–72 Honduran Liga Nacional as well as winning the 1972 CONCACAF Champions' Cup in the first international title for a Honduran club. He then played for Real España throughout the mid-1970s, winning the 1975–76 and the 1976–77 Honduran Liga Nacional titles. Following an additional season with the Aurinegros, he returned to Victoria where he spent the remainder of his career with until his retirement following the 1979–80 Honduran Liga Nacional.

== International career ==
Mejía was first called up to represent Honduras for the 1970 FIFA World Cup qualifiers beginning in 1968. He was later one of the players that played in the infamous set of matches against El Salvador that later served as one of the main catalysts for the outbreak of the Football War. Despite Honduras' modest success in the qualifiers and their qualification for the 1971 CONCACAF Championship, Mejía wouldn't return until the 1973 CONCACAF Championship where Honduras narrowly missed qualification for the 1974 FIFA World Cup.

== Personal life ==
Reynaldo's older brother, Héctor was also a footballer as he played for Atlántida throughout the 1960s. He is also married.
