= Fernando Bulnes =

Honduran footballer (born 1946)

Personal information
- Full name: José Fernando Bulnes Zelaya
- Date of birth: 21 October 1946 (age 80)
- Place of birth: Lamaní, Honduras
- Height: 1.69 m (5 ft 6 1/2 in)
- Position: Defender

Senior career*
Years	Team	Apps	(Gls)
1963–1964	Atlético Español		
1964–1965	Universidad		
1965–1985	Olimpia		

International career
1969–1982	Honduras	34	(1)
- * Club domestic league appearances and goals

José Fernando Bulnes Zelaya (born 21 October 1946) a.k.a. Azulejo, is a retired Honduran football defender who played for Honduras in the 1982 FIFA World Cup.

== Club career ==
Nicknamed Azulejo, Bulnes made his senior debut at 17 and played for Atlético Español, Universidad and Olimpia. He spent a record 20 years with Olimpia in the Honduran national league before retiring in 1985.

== International career ==
Bulnes played for Honduras in the 1960s, 70s and 1980s and represented his country in 12 FIFA World Cup qualification matches and played two games at the 1982 FIFA World Cup at the age of 35.

His final international was the June 1982 World Cup Finals match against Yugoslavia.

== Honours and awards ==
=== Club ===
C.D. Olimpia

- Liga Profesional de Honduras (7): 1966–67, 1967–68, 1969–70, 1971–72, 1977–78, 1982–83, 1984–85,
