= Flavio Ortega =

Brazilian football player and manager (1944-2007)

Personal information
- Full name: Flávio Ortega
- Date of birth: 1944
- Place of birth: São Paulo, Brazil Forward

Senior career*
Years	Team	Apps	(Gls)
- Fluminense
1968	CD Luis Ángel Firpo		
1968–1971	Marathón	67	(30)
1971–1972	Atlético Español Verdún	22	(10)
1973–1974	Real España	21	(5)

Managerial career
- 1988–1990: Real España
- 1991: Honduras
- 1994: Cartaginés
- 1995: Olimpia
- 2000: Universidad
- 2001–2002: Zacapa
- 2002–2003: Marathón
- 2004: Motagua
- 2005: Platense
- 2006: Olimpia
- * Club domestic league appearances and goals

Flávio Ortega (1944 – 6 February 2007) was a Brazilian football player and manager, who spent most of his career in Central America, mainly in Honduras.

== Club career ==
Ortega was a Brazilian footballer who started playing in 1962 and moved abroad to play in El Salvador. He came to Honduras in 1968. He played for Real España and Marathón of San Pedro Sula, rising to become an important player for both clubs.

Ortega was the Honduran league's leading goal-scorer with 18 goals for Marathón in the 1969–70 season. He scored 45 goals in the Honduran league in 110 matches.

== Managerial career ==
After he retired from playing, Ortega managed the Honduras national football team at the 1991 CONCACAF Gold Cup finals, leading Honduras to a second-place finish. He won the 1994 CONCACAF Champions' Cup with Costa Rican side Cartaginés.

== Honduran clubs statistics ==
Team	Season	Games	Goal
Club Deportivo Marathón	1968-69	21	7
Club Deportivo Marathón	1969-70	26	18
Atlético Español	1970-71	22	10
Club Deportivo Marathón	1971-72	20	5
Real España	1973-74	21	5
TOTAL	1968-1974	110	45

== Personal life and death ==
Ortega's mother's name is Maria Candida Sanches, he had a brother named Esteban Ortega Filho and a sister named Rosa Maria Ortega Santos. He was married to Honduran Ligia Hernández de Ortega and the couple had four children: Claudia, Flavio, and twins Liliane and Lilian. He became a Honduran citizen in 1992. In 2005, when with Platense, he suffered multiple injuries sustained in a car accident.

Ortega died of a respiratory disorder, which added to kidney failure both results from a brain haemorrhage, in 2007 in San Pedro Sula.

== Honours ==
=== Manager ===
Real C.D. España

- Liga Nacional de Fútbol de Honduras: (2): 1988–89, 1990–91

C.S. Cartaginés

- CONCACAF Champions' Cup (1): 1994

Olimpia

- Liga Nacional de Fútbol de Honduras (1): 1995–96

Marathón

- Liga Nacional de Fútbol de Honduras (1): 2002–03 C

=== Individual ===
- Honduran Liga Nacional Top Scorer: (1): 1969–70
