= Allard Plummer =

Costa Rican footballer (1949-2021)

Personal information
- Full name: Allard Plummer Miller
- Date of birth: 14 April 1949
- Place of birth: Limón, Costa Rica
- Date of death: 9 July 2021 (aged 72)
- Place of death: Limón, Costa Rica
- Position: Striker

Senior career*
Years	Team	Apps	(Gls)
196?–1972	Limón		
1972–1974	Marathón	76	(19)
1974–1975	Cartaginés		
1975–1976	Limón		(7)
- * Club domestic league appearances and goals as of 11 August 2014

Allard Plummer Miller was a Costa Rican footballer who played as a striker. He was the father of Honduran former footballer Carlos Pavón.

== Club career ==
In Costa Rica, Plummer played for Limón and Cartaginés. He was Limonense's club top goalscorer in 1972 and 1976.

He moved abroad to play for Honduran side Marathón of San Pedro Sula, making his debut on 10 September 1972 against Real España, and scored 19 goals in 76 matches with team. Plummer was top scorer of Honduran Liga Nacional in 1973–74 season with 13 goals, along with Mario Artica.
