= 1972–73 Honduran Segunda División =

Honduran Segunda División
- Season: 1972–73
- Champions: None
- Promoted: None
- All statistics correct as of 1973.

The 1972–73 Honduran Segunda División was scheduled to be the seventh season of the Honduran Segunda División. However, the season was cancelled due to a national football strike. No team was promoted to the 1973–74 Honduran Liga Nacional
