= Arnulfo Echeverría =

Honduran footballer (born 1950)

Personal information
- Date of birth: 10 May 1950 (age 76)
- Place of birth: Olanchito, Yoro, Honduras
- Position: Midfielder

Youth career
- 1966–1969: Olimpia

Senior career*
Years	Team	Apps	(Gls)
1969–1972	Marathón		(34)
1972–1976	Real España		(23)
1977–1979	Platense		(7)
Total			(64)

International career
1971	Honduras	2	(0)
- * Club domestic league appearances and goals

Arnulfo Echeverría (born 10 May 1950) is a retired Honduran footballer. He played as a midfielder for Marathón, Real España and Platense throughout the 1970s. He also represented Honduras for the 1971 CONCACAF Championship.

== Club career ==
Though he was born in Olanchito, Echeverría grew up in Tela and at the age of 16, began playing in the youth sector of Olimpia. Despite this though, he began his senior career with Marathón instead, making his debut in a 4–3 victory against Vida on 6 July 1969 with Echeverría himself scoring the first goal of the match. The 1972–73 Honduran Liga Nacional was notable for Echeverría being transferred to Real España for a record high of 15,000 Honduran lempira, equalizing Jorge Bran's transfer price in 1966. He later played for Platense during the 1977–78 Honduran Liga Nacional where he scored his final goal on 23 April 1978, retiring in the following season and scoring 64 goals throughout his entire career.

== International career ==
Echeverría was first called up by Honduras manager Carlos Suazo for the 1971 CONCACAF Championship. He played in the following matches against eventual champions and runners-up Mexico and Haiti, famously scoring a goal against the latter in just 50 seconds into the game.
