= Jorge Bran =

Honduran footballer (born 1946)

Personal information
- Full name: Jorge Alberto Bran Guevara
- Date of birth: 1 June 1948 (age 78)
- Place of birth: Comayagüela, Francisco Morazán, Honduras
- Height: 1.74 m (5 ft 9 in)
- Position: Forward

Senior career*
Years	Team	Apps	(Gls)
1965–1968	Atlético Indio		
1968–1980	Olimpia		
1973–1975	→ Mallorca (loan)		
1978	→ Windsor Stars (loan)		

International career
1968–1973	Honduras		
- * Club domestic league appearances and goals

Jorge Alberto Bran Guevara (born 1 June 1948) is a retired Honduran footballer. He played as a forward for Olimpia throughout the 1970s, winning many titles with the club. He also had brief tenures with Spanish club Mallorca and Canadian club Windsor Stars. He was also one of the main goalscorers for Honduras throughout the 1970s, participating in the 1971 and 1973 CONCACAF Championship.

== Club career ==
Bran began his career with Atlético Indio during the inaugural 1965–66 Honduran Liga Mayor. He remained in the club for a few seasons until the 1967–68 season where alongside his teammate Jorge Urquía, were sold to Olimpia for 15,000 Honduran lempira which was a record high at the time. The dawn of the 1970s saw Bran be part of the winning squads for the 1969–70 and 1970–71 Honduran Liga Nacional. He enjoyed his greatest achievement during the 1972 CONCACAF Champions' Cup where they beat out Surinamese side Transvaal and proceeded to advance to the 1973 Copa Interamericana.

His success in North American football attracted the attention of Spanish side Mallorca to play for the 1973–74 Segunda División where Urquía was also in. However, his tenure in the club was short-lived following an injury in the sciatic nerve and returned to Honduras following eight months of playing, only managing to score 3 goals for the club. He was part of the initial Olimpia squad that won the 1977–78 Honduran Liga Nacional though he would then play for the Windsor Stars in Canada throughout the remainder of the year. He then returned to Olimpia for his final season before retiring in 1980, scoring 38 goals for the Leones throughout his entire career.

== International career ==
Bran was first called up to represent Honduras for the 1970 FIFA World Cup qualifiers. He then participated in the 1971 CONCACAF Championship but would find more success in the following 1973 CONCACAF Championship, scoring in the 1–1 draw against Guatemala on 15 December 1973.
