= 1968–69 Honduran Segunda División =

Honduran Segunda División
- Season: 1968–69
- Champions: Lempira
- Promoted: Lempira
- All statistics correct as of 13 April 1969.

The 1968–69 Honduran Segunda División was the third season of the Honduran Segunda División. Under the management of José Bejarano, Lempira F.C. won the tournament after defeating C.D. Broncos in the final series and obtained promotion to the 1969–70 Honduran Liga Nacional.

== Final ==
April 1969 1st leg	Lempira	4–3	Broncos

13 April 1969 2nd leg	Broncos	1–2	Lempira	Tegucigalpa, Francisco Morazán
				Stadium: Estadio Tiburcio Carías Andino

- Lempira won 6–4 on aggregate.
