= C.D. Verdún =

Honduran football club

Verdún
- Full name: Club Deportivo Atlético Español Verdún
- Ground: Tiburcio Carías Andino; Tegucigalpa, Honduras
- Capacity: 35,000
Home colours

Club Deportivo Verdún was a Honduran football club.

== History ==
The club competed in the Liga Nacional de Fútbol de Honduras during the 1971–72 season, after it purchased the franchise of Atlético Español. A year later they sold their franchise to Broncos who were later sold to Universidad to become Broncos UNAH and later just Universidad.

== Achievements ==
- Segunda División

Winners (1): 1969–70
