= Lempira F.C. =

Honduran football club

Lempira de Guaruma
- Full name: Lempira de Guaruma Football Club
- Nickname: Aborígenes
- Ground: La Lima
Home colours	Away colours	Third colours

Lempira de Guaruma FC is a Honduran football club, based in La Lima originally from banana field Guaruma Uno, Honduras.

== History ==
Lempira ascended to the Liga Nacional de Primera División in 1968, defeating Broncos de Choluteca twice in the promotion final, with scores of 2-1 and 2-0.

It was in the first division of the Honduran national league in the 1969, 1970 and 1971 seasons, a season in which it was relegated to the second division, They were relegated to second division for the 1971–72 season, drawing 0-0 with Vida.

== Achievements ==
- Segunda División

Winners (1): 1968–69

== League performance ==
Regular season											Post season								
Season	Pos	P	W	D	L	F	A	PTS	+/-	Ded	Pos	P	W	D	L	F	A	PTS	+/-
1969–70	9th	27	7	5	15	33	45	19	-12	–	No post season this year								
1970–71	9th	27	5	9	13	25	44	19	-19	–	No post season this year								
1971–72	10th	27	5	6	16	24	45	16	-21	–	No post season this year								
