= 1972 CONCACAF Champions' Cup =

8th edition of premier club football tournament organized by CONCACAF

Tournament details
- Dates: 29 October 1971 – 31 January 1972
- Teams: 10 (from 6 associations)

Final positions
- Champions: (Honduras) Olimpia (1st title)
- Runners-up: (Suriname (Kingdom of the Netherlands)) SV Robinhood

The 1972 CONCACAF Champions' Cup was the 8th edition of the annual international club football competition held in the CONCACAF region (North America, Central America and the Caribbean), the CONCACAF Champions' Cup. It determined that year's club champion of association football in the CONCACAF region and was played from 29 October 1971 to 31 January 1972 under the home/away match system.

The tournament was split into two zones (North/Central American and Caribbean), each one qualifying the winner to the final tournament. CD Olimpia from Honduras won the final, and became for the first time in its history CONCACAF champion.

== North/Central American Zone ==
Unknown if clubs from:
Costa Rica
El Salvador
Guatemala
(United States) United States
entered the tournament.

=== First round ===
- Earlier results and matches unavailable.
  Eliminated participants apparently included:
  (Mexico) América
  (Nicaragua) Deportivo Santa Cecilia
  (Panama) Unión Española
- (Honduras) Olimpia qualified for semifinal.

Team 1	Agg.	Team 2	1st leg	2nd leg
Toluca (Mexico)	4–1	(Honduras) Vida	3–1	1–0

23 July 1972	Toluca (Mexico)	3–1	(Honduras) Vida	Toluca, Mexico
				Stadium: Estadio Nemesio Díez

30 July 1972	Vida (Honduras)	0–1 (1–4 agg.)	(Mexico) Toluca	San Pedro Sula, Honduras
				Stadium: Estadio Francisco Morazán

(Mexico) Toluca advances to the semifinal.

== Caribbean Zone ==
=== First round ===
Team 1	Agg.	Team 2	1st leg	2nd leg
Transvaal (Suriname (Kingdom of the Netherlands))	2 - 3	(Suriname (Kingdom of the Netherlands)) Robinhood	1 - 0	1 - 3

Transvaal (Suriname (Kingdom of the Netherlands))	1–0	(Suriname (Kingdom of the Netherlands)) Robinhood

Robinhood (Suriname (Kingdom of the Netherlands))	3-1 (2-3 agg.)	(Suriname (Kingdom of the Netherlands)) Transvaal

(Suriname (Kingdom of the Netherlands)) Robinhood advances to the second round.

Team 1	Agg.	Team 2	1st leg	2nd leg
Don Bosco (Haiti)	***	(Haiti) Aigle Noir		

- Don Bosco apparently won; results unknown. Advances to the second round.

=== Second round ===
Team 1	Agg.	Team 2	1st leg	2nd leg
Robinhood (Suriname (Kingdom of the Netherlands))	w/o	(Haiti) Don Bosco		

- Robinhood, won presumably by withdrawal and advanced to the CONCACAF Final.

== Semifinal ==
18 December 1972 1st leg	Toluca (Mexico)	0 – 1	(Honduras) Olimpia	Tegucigalpa, Honduras
		Report	Mejía	Stadium: Estadio Tiburcio Carías Andino; Referee: Juan Molinero (GUA)

20 December 1972 2nd leg	Olimpia (Honduras)	1 – 1	(Mexico) Toluca	Tegucigalpa, Honduras
	Urquía 40'	Report	Eugui 72'	Stadium: Estadio Tiburcio Carías Andino; Referee: Giovanni Conessa (GUA)

- Olimpia won 2–1 on aggregate.

== Final ==
=== First leg ===
1972 CONCACAF Champions' Cup Final
28 January 1973
First leg

Robinhood (Suriname (Kingdom of the Netherlands))	0–1	(Honduras) Olimpia
		43' Bran

Estadio Francisco Morazán, San Pedro Sula
Attendance: 13,359
Referee: Luis Bocaletti (GUA)

=== Second leg ===
1 February 1973
Second leg

Olimpia (Honduras)	0–0	(Suriname (Kingdom of the Netherlands)) Robinhood

Estadio Tiburcio Carías Andino, Tegucigalpa
Attendance: 20,000
Referee: Mario Rubio (MEX)
- Olimpia won 1–0 on aggregate.

Team details

Olimpia
Robin Hood

GK	(Honduras) Samuel Sentini
DF	(Honduras) Selvin Cárcamo
DF	(Honduras) Oscar Banegas
DF	(Honduras) Miguel Ángel Matamoros
DF	(Honduras) Ventura López
MF	(Honduras) Domingo Ferrera
MF	(Honduras) Ángel Paz
FW	(Honduras) Rigoberto Gómez	Substituted off
FW	(Honduras) Reynaldo Mejía	Substituted off
FW	(Honduras) Jorge Urquía
FW	(Honduras) Jorge Bran
Substitutions:
FW	(Honduras) Mario Mairena	Substituted on
FW	(Honduras) Raúl Suazo	Substituted on
Manager:
(Colombia) Carlos Viera

GK	(Suriname (Kingdom of the Netherlands)) Edmond Leillis
DF	(Suriname (Kingdom of the Netherlands)) Wilfred Siom
DF	(Suriname (Kingdom of the Netherlands)) Kenneth Blacker
DF	(Suriname (Kingdom of the Netherlands)) Wenley Olenberg
DF	(Suriname (Kingdom of the Netherlands)) Nilton Vogeland
MF	(Suriname (Kingdom of the Netherlands)) Delano Waterral
MF	(Suriname (Kingdom of the Netherlands)) Fritz Zebeda
MF	(Suriname (Kingdom of the Netherlands)) Jan Carron	Substituted off
MF	(Suriname (Kingdom of the Netherlands)) Silrfred Rostemberg
FW	(Suriname (Kingdom of the Netherlands)) Rihaldo Emtingh	Substituted off
FW	(Suriname (Kingdom of the Netherlands)) Frank Burtesson
Substitutions:
MF	(Suriname (Kingdom of the Netherlands)) William Joselet	Substituted on
FW	(Suriname (Kingdom of the Netherlands)) Venenburg Helsmass	Substituted on
Manager:
?

== Champion ==
CONCACAF Champions' Cup
1972 champion

1st title
