= C.D. Atlético Español =

Atlético Español
- Full name: Club Deportivo Atlético Español
- Founded: 1946
- Dissolved: 1972
- Ground: Estadio Tiburcio Carías Andino; Tegucigalpa, Honduras
- Capacity: 35,000
- League: Honduran Liga Nacional (before 1972)
| Home colours | Away colours | Third colours |

Club Deportivo Atlético Español was a football club based in Tegucigalpa, Honduras.

== History ==
One of the current Honduran league's founding members, the club competed in the Liga Nacional de Fútbol de Honduras several times from the inaugural season in 1965 until 1971 when Verdún purchased its franchise. They were named Atlético Español Glidden, then Atlético Español Sahsa before being renamed Atlético Español Verdún. Their first manager became Alfonso Uclés Sierra and they were beaten 3–0 by C.D. Honduras in the league's first ever game.

The franchise was later sold on to Broncos, then to Universidad to become Broncos UNAH and later just Universidad.

== League and Cup Performance ==
| Regular season | | | Post season | | Cup |
| Season | Finish | Record | Finish | Record | Finish |
|---|---|---|---|---|---|
| 1965–66 | 10th | 2–5–11 (28:45) | Not applicable | | Not played |
| 1966–67 | 7th | 6–4–8 (25:31) | Not applicable | | Not played |
| 1967–68 | 9th | 3–6–9 (22:30) | Saved | 1–0–0 (3:2) | Not played |
| 1968–69 | 10th | 3–9–15 (19:41) | Not applicable | | Group stage |
| 1970–71 | 8th | 6–9–12 (29:47) | Not applicable | | Not played |
| 1971–72 | As C.D. Verdún ↓ | | | | |
