= Mario Blandón =

Honduran footballer

Mario Artica
Personal information
- Full name: Mario Blandón Artica
- Place of birth: Honduras
- Position: Forward

Senior career*
Years	Team	Apps	(Gls)
1969–1976	Motagua	134	(48)
1977–1978	Federal	10	(1)

International career
1974	Honduras		
Medal record
Representing Motagua
Silver medal – second place	Liga Nacional	1969–70
Gold medal – first place	Liga Nacional	1970–71
Bronze medal – third place	Liga Nacional	1971–72
Gold medal – first place	Liga Nacional	1973–74
Silver medal – second place	Liga Nacional	1974–75
Bronze medal – third place	Liga Nacional	1975–76
- * Club domestic league appearances and goals as of 29 July 2010

Mario Blandón Artica is a retired Honduran football forward.

== Club career ==
He played most of his senior career for Honduran giants F.C. Motagua in the Honduran league and was part of the famous team that remained unbeaten for 32 games in a row in 1973-1974. He is currently the sixth best scorer for Motagua of all times with 48 goals. He also played for Federal.

== International career ==
Blandón has represented Honduras in 5 FIFA World Cup qualification matches in 1974.

== Honours ==
=== Motagua ===
- Liga Nacional de Fútbol de Honduras: 2

1970–71, 1973–74

=== Individual ===
- Top goalscorer in Liga Nacional de Honduras: 1

1973–74
