= Jorge Urquía =

Honduran footballer (1946–2026)

Personal information
- Full name: Jorge Alberto Urquía Elvir
- Date of birth: 19 September 1946
- Place of birth: Comayagua, Comayagua Department, Honduras
- Date of death: 14 May 2026 (aged 79)
- Height: 1.74 m (5 ft 9 in)
- Position: Forward

Senior career*
Years	Team	Apps	(Gls)
1967–1968	Atlético Indio		
1968–1973	Olimpia		
1973–1975	Mallorca	66	(0)
1975–1978	Alavés	70	(12)
1978–1981	Olimpia		

International career
1968–1981	Honduras	11	(3)
- * Club domestic league appearances and goals

Jorge Alberto Urquía Elvir (19 September 1946 – 14 May 2026) was a Honduran footballer. Nicknamed Indio (the Indian), he played as a forward for Olimpia within Honduras and Mallorca in Spain throughout the 1970s. He also represented Honduras in the 1971 and 1981 CONCACAF Championships.

== Club career ==
Born in Comayagua, Urquía began his career with Atlético Indio for the 1967–68 Honduran Liga Nacional with the club narrowly missing relegation that season. Despite this, he caught the interest of rival club Olimpia and would later sign him for the following 1968–69 Honduran Liga Nacional. Throughout his first tenure with the club, he would be a part of the golden generation of the early 1970s, winning the 1969–70 and 1971–72 Honduran Liga Nacionales as well as being part of the winning squad for the 1972 CONCACAF Champions' Cup, going on to play in the 1973 Copa Interamericana. This success would catch the interest of Segunda División de España club Mallorca and he would sign with the club for the 1973–74 Segunda División until their relegation in the following season where he played alongside fellow Honduran footballers Miguel Ángel Matamoros and Jorge Bran. He remained in Spain with Deportivo Alavés for the following seasons, notably playing with Argentine forward Jorge Valdano as one of the main goalscorers for the club until returning to Olimpia in 1978 and would play until 1981.

== International career ==
Urquía was first called up to represent Honduras during the 3–1 victory against Jamaica on 5 December 1968 during the 1970 FIFA World Cup qualifiers with Urquía scoring the first goal in 18 minutes. He was also one of the Honduran players that participated in the matches against El Salvador that were one of the main catalysts for the Football War breaking out between the two countries.

He later played in the 1971 CONCACAF Championship where the Catrachos would end in last place. During the following 1973 CONCACAF Championship qualifiers, he was the first goalscorer for Honduras in the 3–3 draw against Costa Rica that Honduras narrowly won. Despite this success, Urquía was not included in the final roster of the tournament. He also missed the 1977 CONCACAF Championship due to Honduras choosing not to participate in the tournament in favor of the 1977 FIFA World Youth Championship. He was then included in the final roster of the 1981 CONCACAF Championship which perplexed many Honduran fans at the time due to his age and questioned Chelato Uclés about the decision. However, Urquía ended up being a major contributor towards Honduras making their World Cup debut and even scored a goal in the 4–0 beating of Haiti despite ultimately not being included in the final roster for the 1982 FIFA World Cup.

== Personal life and death ==
Following his retirement, Urquia suffered from alcohol addiction. He died on 14 May 2026, at the age of 79.
