= Jorge Alberto Solís =

Honduran footballer (1935-1997)

Julio Alberto Solís
Personal information
- Full name: Jorge Alberto Solís López
- Date of birth: 1 January 1935
- Place of birth: Honduras
- Date of death: 31 May 1997 (aged 62)
- Place of death: Tegucigalpa, Honduras
- Position: Leftback

Youth career
- Argentina

Senior career*
Years	Team	Apps	(Gls)
1953–1955	Federal		
1955–1965	Olimpia		
1965–1966	Platense		
1969–1972	Motagua		

International career
1960–1965	Honduras		
- * Club domestic league appearances and goals

Jorge Alberto Solís López (1 January 1935 — 31 May 1997) was a Honduran football defender.

== Club career ==
Nicknamed Furia, (Spanish for "Fury") Solís played for Honduran giants Olimpia in the Honduran National League during the 1950s and 1960s. He played in the 1961 Championship of Central America and the Caribbean. He was also part of Platense's squad when they became the first Honduran League champions in 1966.

== International career ==
The left-sided Solís had represented his country in 8 FIFA World Cup qualification matches

== Retirement and death ==
After his football career, Solís was manager of the National Commission for Sports Facilities and Improvement. He died, aged 62, of cardiac arrest in 1997.
