= Rubén Guifarro =

Honduran footballer (born 1949)

Personal information
- Full name: Rubén Guifarro Moradel
- Date of birth: 15 October 1946 (age 80)
- Place of birth: Catacamas, Olancho, Honduras
- Position: Midfielder

Senior career*
Years	Team	Apps	(Gls)
1967–1984	Motagua	260	(21)

International career
1971–1973	Honduras	2	(0)

Managerial career
- 1985–1987: Motagua
- 2001: Real España
- 2002: Marathón
- 2004–2006: Honduras U–20
- 2009: Platense
- 2009: Real Juventud
- 2011: Atlético Choloma
- 2012: Juticalpa
- 2012: Real Juventud
- 2012–2013: Yoro
- 2014: Real Juventud
- 2014: Independiente
- 2018: Santos
- 2019: Bucaneros
- * Club domestic league appearances and goals

Rubén Guifarro Moradel (born 15 October 1946) is a retired Honduran football player and manager. Nicknamed "Chamaco" and "Popito", he played as a midfielder for Motagua throughout the 1970s and the early 1980s. He also represented Honduras for the 1971 and 1973 CONCACAF Championships.

== Club career ==
Making his debut during the 1967–68 Honduran Liga Nacional, he achieved his first title in the following 1968–69 Honduran Liga Nacional where the club achieved their first professional title. Throughout his career, he would contribute to the club winning the 1970–71, 1973–74 and 1978–79 titles before retiring following the 1983–84 Honduran Liga Nacional.

== International career ==
Guifarro was first called up to represent Honduras in the 1971 CONCACAF Championship as a substitute player but wouldn't make a single appearance in the tournament. He played a far more significant role in the 1973 CONCACAF Championship as he participated in the qualifiers against Costa Rica as well as in the final tournament against Mexico.

== Managerial career ==
Following his retirement, he began to serve as Motagua's manager for the 1985–86 Honduran Liga Nacional. Following an additional season, he began to serve as the manager for various different Honduran clubs across the 2000s and 2010s.

== Personal life ==
The Estadio Rubén Guifarro is named after him.
