= Rigoberto Gómez (footballer, born 1944) =

Honduran footballer (born 1944)

Personal information
- Full name: Rigoberto Gómez Murillo
- Date of birth: 16 December 1944 (age 81)
- Place of birth: Talanga, Francisco Morazán, Honduras
- Position: Forward

Senior career*
Years	Team	Apps	(Gls)
1966–1980	Olimpia		(63)

International career
1968–1973	Honduras	17	(8)
- * Club domestic league appearances and goals

Rigoberto Gómez Murillo (born 16 December 1944) is a retired Honduran footballer. Nicknamed "Shula", he played as a forward for Olimpia throughout the late 1960s and the 1970s, winning many titles with the club. He also represented Honduras for the 1971 and 1973 CONCACAF Championships.

== Club career ==
Gómez began his career within the youth sectors of Motagua, Gimnástico and Federal until finding a spot in the senior roster of Olimpia for the 1966–67 Honduran Liga Nacional where the Leones achieved their first national title with this success later repeated in the following Honduran Liga Nacional. The 1970s would see the peak of Gómez's career as he was part of the winning squads for the 1969–70 and the 1971–72 Honduran Liga Nacionals. During the 1972 CONCACAF Champions' Cup, he participated in the campaign that saw Olimpia win the championship as well as play in the 1973 Copa Interamericana, considering it a highlight of his career even if the club ended up losing to Argentinian side Independiente. He would earn his final title with Olimpia in the 1977–78 Honduran Liga Nacional before retiring two seasons later.

== International career ==
Gómez was first called up to play for Honduras during the 1970 FIFA World Cup qualifiers where Honduras would later be knocked out by El Salvador. He later participated in the 1971 CONCACAF Championship under manager Carlos Suazo. He later also participated in the 1973 CONCACAF Championship with Gómez achieving the honor of being the Honduran footballer with the highest number of goals scored against Costa Rica during the qualifiers for the tournament.

== Personal life ==
Following his retirement, Gómez worked at the Alcaldía Municipal de Tegucigalpa until 1991 where following financial problems, moved to The Bronx, New York City to work as a painter for a company of wedding veils. He currently lives with his sister. He had three children throughout his life with his son, Rigoberto Gómez later obtaining Guatemalan citizenship to play for their national team.
