= Samuel Sentini =

Honduran footballer (1948-2014)

Samuel Sentine
Personal information
- Full name: Samuel Boldwin Sentine Baynes
- Date of birth: 1948
- Place of birth: La Ceiba, Honduras
- Date of death: 29 December 2014 (aged 66)
- Place of death: Comayagua, Honduras
- Position: Goalkeeper

Senior career*
Years	Team	Apps	(Gls)
- Atlético Indio
1970–1976	Olimpia		

International career
- Honduras national team
- * Club domestic league appearances and goals

Samuel Boldwin Sentine Baynes (c. 1948 – 29 December 2014), also known as just Sentini, was a Honduran football goalkeeper.

== Club career ==
Born in La Ceiba, Sentine was an airplane pilot before turning to football with Atlético Indio. He later moved to Honduran giants Olimpia.

He was regarded as one of Olimpia's best goalkeepers in history, winning the 1972 CONCACAF Champions' Cup with the club.

== International career ==
Sentine represented Honduras national team in 1 FIFA World Cup qualification match.

== Retirement and death ==
He retired from football at 47 in 1995. In January 2011, Sentine suffered a stroke. He died from Alzheimer's disease in December 2014.
