= Óscar Hernández (footballer, born 1950) =

Honduran footballer

Personal information
- Full name: Óscar Rolando Hernández
- Date of birth: 10 June 1950 (age 76)
- Place of birth: Honduras
- Position: Forward

Senior career*
| Years | Team | Apps | (Gls) |
| 1968–1976 | Motagua | 191 | (66) |
| 1976–1979 | Marathón | 61 | (15) |
| 1979–1980 | Atlético Portuario | 15 | (3) |

International career
| | Honduras | 12 | (5) |
Medal record
Representing Motagua
| Gold medal – first place | Liga Nacional | 1968–69 |
| Silver medal – second place | Liga Nacional | 1969–70 |
| Gold medal – first place | Liga Nacional | 1970–71 |
| Bronze medal – third place | Liga Nacional | 1971–72 |
| Gold medal – first place | Liga Nacional | 1973–74 |
| Silver medal – second place | Liga Nacional | 1974–75 |
| Bronze medal – third place | Liga Nacional | 1975–76 |
Representing Marathón
| Bronze medal – third place | Liga Nacional | 1976–77 |
- * Club domestic league appearances and goals as of 22 July 2010

Óscar Rolando Hernández (nicknamed "Martillo", hammer in English) is a Honduran retired football forward.

== Club career ==
Hernández played most of his senior career for F.C. Motagua in the Honduran league. He is currently the third best scorer for Motagua of all time with 66 goals. He also played for Marathón with whom he won a top goalscorer award and Atlético Portuario.

== International career ==
Hernández has represented Honduras in 3 FIFA World Cup qualification matches.

== Honours ==
Motagua

1968–69
1970–71
1973–74

Individual

Top goalscorer with Marathón in 1976–77
