= Luis Cruz (Honduran footballer) =

Honduran footballer (1952–2021)

Personal information
- Full name: José Luis Cruz Figueroa
- Date of birth: 9 February 1952
- Place of birth: San Juancito, Honduras
- Date of death: 27 January 2021 (aged 68)
- Place of death: San Pedro Sula, Honduras
- Position: Defender

Senior career*
Years	Team	Apps	(Gls)
1970–1975	Motagua		(2)
1975–1980	Real España		(1)
1980–1982	Atlético Morazán		(1)
1982–1983	Motagua		(0)
1983–1984	Juventud Morazánica		(0)
1984–1987	Motagua		(0)
1987–1988	Universidad		(1)

International career
1972–1982	Honduras		
- * Club domestic league appearances and goals

José Luis Cruz Figueroa (9 February 1952 – 27 January 2021) was a Honduran football player.

== Club career ==
Luis Cruz was a central defender who had a successful career in Honduran soccer. From San Junacito he came to Tegucigalpa to join the ranks of the Motagua Sports Club at only 16 years of age. Throughout his career as a footballer; Luis Cruz played 340 league games in 18 years as a professional player.

With the capital club Luis Cruz he participated from 1970 to 1975, winning two championships and a runner-up. After his participation with the Motagua Sports Club, Luis Cruz joined the Real Club Deportivo España where he was crowned champion in 1975 and 1976. Cruz also played the finals of 1977 and 1978 where the 'Aurinegro' team had to settle for the runner-up.

After his participation in the Real Club Deportivo España, Luis Cruz signed with Atlético Morazán. In that team the defender; he participated in 87 matches reaching the runner-up in 1981.

From Atlético Morazán, Luis Cruz returned to Club Deportivo Motagua where he participated in more than 80 games. Finally, for the 1987 - 1988 season, he ended his participation in the National Football League of Honduras playing for the University club where he participated in more than 20 matches.

== International career ==
Luis Cruz had extensive participation with the Honduras soccer team. His first participation in the qualifiers was against Germany in 1974.

After dodging the PRE-hexagonal round, Honduras had an acceptable participation, beating the strongest rival ( Trinidad and Tobago ) 2-1, drawing 0-0 with Mexico. However, the Honduran team practically lost the classification, when they were defeated by the Haitian soccer team 1-0.

Among the players who participated alongside Cruz, in this tie were: the goalkeeper; Jimmy Stewart, 'Mozambique' Álvarez, Jaime Villegas, Ruben Guifarro, Mariano Godoy, 'El Tractor' Ramírez and Jorge Bran to name a few.

Although Luis could have played the qualifying rounds for the 1978 World Cup in Argentina, he had to settle for 'seeing the bulls from the sidelines' since the extracurricular sports federation of Honduras gave up participating in the qualifying rounds due to the political differences it held with his neighboring country of El Salvador.

Luis Cruz had his revenge and was a participant in the 1982 qualifying rounds in Spain, where Honduras qualified first in the tie played in Tegucigalpa in 1981. Once at the World Cup in Spain, Cruz had the opportunity to participate in the match that Honduras held against the Northern Ireland.

== Personal life ==
Cruz was admitted to a San Pedro Sula hospital in January 2021, after being diagnosed with COVID-19 during the COVID-19 pandemic in Honduras. He died of complications of the virus on 27 January 2021, aged 68, thirteen days short of his 69th birthday.
