= Liga Nacional de Fútbol de Honduras =

Honduran association football league

Liga Hondubet
- Founded: 10 May 1964; 62 years ago
- First season: 1965–66
- Country: Honduras
- Confederation: CONCACAF
- Number of clubs: 12
- Level on pyramid: 1
- Domestic cup: Honduran Cup (former)
- International cup(s): Regional; CONCACAF Central American Cup; Continental; CONCACAF Champions Cup
- Current champions: Olimpia
- Most championships: Olimpia (40)
- Broadcaster(s): TVC/Deportes TVC; Fox Deportes
- Website: www.lnphn.com
- Current: 2025–26 Honduran Liga Nacional

Liga Nacional de Fútbol Profesional de Honduras, known as Liga Hondubet for sponsorship reasons (Honduran National Professional Football League) is the highest division of domestic football in Honduras. The league season is divided into Opening (autumn) and Closing (spring). One team is relegated to the Liga de Ascenso (the team with fewest points in Opening and Closing) and one team is promoted from Liga de Ascenso. The top four clubs participate in play-offs to decide the champion.

== History ==
In the 1930s, football experienced a surge in popularity in the country. In 1948 with the birth of the Francisco Morazán Major Football League, the idea to organize football began to take shape.

Olimpia, Federal, Motagua, Argentina and Real España are the pioneers of the Liga Mayor. In 1948 the first championship began in the recently inaugurated Estadio Tiburcio Carías Andino as Victoria were made champions by beating Motagua; and three years later, in 1951, they repeated the trick. Due to the high support the League received at this time, the Confederacy Sports School Extra of Honduras (F.N.D.E.H.) was founded.

The cancellation of the court of the Francisco Morazán Stadium of San Pedro Sula was the catalyst that caused the sport's leaders of the northern and central parts of Honduras to join forces and caused the disappearance of the F.N.D.E.H.

On 8 March 1951, Juan Manuel Galvez gave life to the F.N.D.E.H. when he signed the presidential decree I number 97 and he vouched for the execution of the first Sports Congress that was carried out in the installations of the abandoned "National Gymnasium Rubén Callejas Valentine".

Old logo (2007–2012)

A decade after the creation of the F.N.D.E.H. and under the leadership of Hémerito F. Hernández, and also under Féderico Bunker Aguilar who had pioneered CONCACAF's creation at the same time, the idea to create the First National League of Football took shape between 1962 and 1963. Thanks in part to the aid of executives such as Alejandro Talbott that had studied in Mexico, the structure of that country's league was copied. On Saturday 3 and Sunday 4 April 1964, the 15th National Congress created the league. The 15th National Congress also started the National Non Amateur Football League of Honduras, LINAFUTH, that was founded 10 May, that year.

The president of the Sports Confederacy was Oscar Kafati and the secretary was journalist Andrés Torres Jr. Several teams sent delegates. These included Olimpia, Troya, España, Honduras de El Progreso, Vida, Marathón, Motagua, La Salle, and Atlético Español Glidden. Those delegates were chosen to be to the first Provisional board of directors that remained headed by: President Oscar Lara Mejía, Secretary: José T. Castañeda, Treasurer: Jesus J. Handal, Fiscal: Humberto Soriano Aguilar and vocal: Oscar Kirckonell, Alfredo Bueso, René Bendeck.

The first round of the first professional national championship was on 18 July 1965, with the following results: Olimpia 3–0 Marathón; España 1–0 Troya; Honduras 3–0 Atlético Español; Vida 4–1 Motagua; and Platense 6–2 La Salle. Jorge "Burro" Deras of Honduras Progreso was the first scorer of the league in the 5th minute against Atlético Español. Platense was the first professional champion of Honduras winning the two rounds; and Atlético Español finished last, but there was no relegation. Enrique Fúnez was the first top-scorer with 14 goals.

== 2023–24 teams ==
Location of teams in the 2023–24 season

A total of 10 teams contested the tournament, including nine teams that participated in the 2022–23 season. Honduras Progreso was relegated, and Génesis went up to the first division.

Team	Location	Stadium	Capacity
Génesis	Comayagua	Estadio Carlos Miranda	10,000
Marathón	San Pedro Sula	Estadio Yankel Rosenthal	15,000
Motagua	Tegucigalpa	Estadio Tiburcio Carías Andino	35,000
Olimpia	Tegucigalpa	Estadio Tiburcio Carías Andino	35,000
Olancho FC	Juticalpa	Estadio Juan Ramón Brevé Vargas	20,000
C.D. Victoria	La Ceiba	Estadio Nilmo Edwards	18,000
Real España	San Pedro Sula	Estadio Francisco Morazán	26,781
Real Sociedad	Tocoa	Estadio Francisco Martínez Durón	3,000
UPNFM	Choluteca	Estadio Emilio Williams Agasse	8,000
Juticalpa	Olancho	Estadio Juan Ramon Breve Vargas	18,000

== Current format ==
Two tournaments per year with identical format, each crowning one champion:

- Apertura (Opening): from July to December
- Clausura (Closing): from January to May

11 clubs participating. The league format consists of a round-robin tournament with each club playing each other twice (home and away), for a total of 20 matches per team per tournament.

The top six advance to the playoffs. Unlike previous seasons, the final phase no longer uses a repechaje (play-in round) and semifinals. Instead, the six qualified teams are divided into two triangular groups of three, known as Triangulares seminfinales:

- The clubs ranked 1st and 2nd in the regular season are seeded into separate groups (Triangular A and Triangular B).
- The clubs ranked 3rd, 4th, 5th, and 6th are placed into a single draw to determine which triangular they join.

Each team in the triangular plays four matches (home and away against the other two teams in its group), for a total of four additional matches per team. The group winners qualify for the grand final. If teams are tied on points at the end of the triangular, the team that finished higher in the regular-season standings (1st or 2nd) advances to the final.

The winners of each triangular contest a two-legged grand final to crown the champion of each tournament.

== Relegation and promotion ==
Relegation is decided by the addition of both Apertura and Clausura tournament tables. The last team of the aggregated table is relegated to Liga de Ascenso de Honduras. Promotion is decided in Liga de Ascenso de Honduras. Up to 2004 the champions were awarded automatic promotion. Since then, the season was divided into Apertura and Clausura, where champions face each other to decide promotion.

== Records and statistics ==
=== Top scoring players ===
As of 5 April 2025

- Bold players are still active

No.	Player	Goals
1	(Honduras) Jerry Bengtson	199
2	(Honduras) Wilmer Velásquez	196
3	(Brazil) Denilson Costa	155
4	(Honduras) Román Castillo	122
5	(Honduras) Rony Martínez	117
6	(Honduras) Juan Cárcamo	101
7	(Uruguay) Claudio Cardozo	100
8	(Brazil) Marcelo Ferreira	98
9	(Colombia) Yustin Arboleda	96
10	(Honduras) Francisco Ramírez	95
11	(Honduras) Ángel Tejeda	93
12	(Honduras) Carlos Pavón	90
13	(Brazil) Luciano Emílio	89
13	(Honduras) Luis Ramírez	89
13	(Honduras) Roger Rojas	89
16	(Honduras) Prudencio Norales	88
17	(Argentina) Danilo Tosello	86
18	(Honduras) Óscar Hernández	84
18	(Brazil) Ney Costa	84
20	(Honduras) Ángel Obando	83
20	(Honduras) Eduardo Bennett	83
22	(Honduras) Pompilio Cacho	81
23	(Argentina) Oswaldo Altamirano	80

=== Titles by year ===
==== Amateur era ====
Season	Champion	Runners-up
1947	Victoria	Motagua
1948	Motagua	Victoria
1949	Hibueras	Olimpia
1950–51	Motagua	Sula
1951–52	Sula	Motagua
1952	Aduana	Federal
1953	Federal	Aduana
1954–55	Abacá	Aduana
1955–56	Hibueras	Olimpia
1957–58	Olimpia	Hibueras
1958–59	Olimpia	Independiente
1959	Olimpia	Marathón
1960–61	Olimpia	España
1961	Olimpia	Independiente
1962	Vida	Salamar
1963–64	Olimpia	España
1964	Olimpia	Platense

==== Professional era ====
Season	Champions	Runners-up	Third place	Fourth place
1965–66	Platense (1)	Olimpia (1)	Vida (1)	Troya (1)
1966–67	Olimpia (1)	Marathón (1)	Vida (2)	España (1)
1967–68	Olimpia (2)	Marathón (2)	Honduras (1)	Vida (1)
1968–69	Motagua (1)	Olimpia (2)	Platense (1)	Atlético Indio (1)
1969–70	Olimpia (3)	Motagua (1)	Marathón (1)	Vida (2)
1970–71	Motagua (2)	Olimpia (3)	Marathón (2)	España (2)
1971–72	Olimpia (4)	Vida (1)	Motagua (1)	España (3)
1972–73	Abandoned due to financial issues.			
1973–74	Motagua (3)	Marathón (3)	Olimpia (1)	España (4)
1974–75	España (1)	Motagua (2)	Olimpia (2)	Marathón (1)
1975–76	España (2)	Olimpia (4)	Motagua (2)	Universidad (1)
1976–77	España (3)	Motagua (3)	Marathón (3)	Vida (3)
1977–78	Olimpia (5)	Real España (1)	Motagua (3)	Vida (4)
1978–79	Motagua (4)	Real España (2)	Olimpia (3)	Broncos (1)
1979–80	Marathón (1)	Universidad (1)	Victoria (1)	Broncos (2)
1980–81	Real España (4)	Marathón (4)	Olimpia (4)	Vida (5)
1981–82	Vida (1)	Atlético Morazán (1)	Motagua (4)	Marathón (2)
1982–83	Olimpia (6)	Motagua (4)	Real España (1)	Victoria (1)
1983–84	Vida (2)	Universidad (2)	Marathón (4)	Olimpia (1)
1984–85	Olimpia (7)	Vida (2)	Victoria (2)	Marathón (3)
1985–86	Marathón (2)	Vida (3)	Motagua (5)	Olimpia (2)
1986–87	Olimpia (8)	Real España (3)	Vida (3)	Platense (1)
1987–88	Olimpia (9)	Marathón (5)	Real España (2)	Sula (1)
1988–89	Real España (5)	Olimpia (5)	Motagua (6)	Vida (6)
1989–90	Olimpia (10)	Real España (4)	Motagua (7)	Platense (2)
1990–91	Real España (6)	Motagua (5)	Olimpia (5)	Platense (3)
1991–92	Motagua (5)	Real España (5)	Olimpia (6)	Platense (4)
1992–93	Olimpia (11)	Petrotela (1)	Marathón (5)	Real España (5)
1993–94	Real España (7)	Motagua (6)	Vida (4)	Victoria (2)
1994–95	Victoria (1)	Olimpia (6)	Real España (3)	Motagua (1)
1995–96	Olimpia (12)	Real España (6)	Victoria (3)	Motagua (2)
1996–97	Olimpia (13)	Platense (1)	Victoria (4)	Real España (6)
1997–98 A	Motagua (6)	Real España (7)	Olimpia (7)	Platense (5)
1997–98 C	Motagua (7)	Olimpia (7)	Victoria (5)	Platense (6)
1998–99	Olimpia (14)	Real España (8)	Motagua (8)	Victoria (3)
1999–2000 A	Motagua (8)	Olimpia (8)	Victoria (6)	Broncos (3)
1999–2000 C	Motagua (9)	Olimpia (9)	Marathón (6)	Federal (1)
2000–01 A	Olimpia (15)	Platense (2)	Universidad (1)	Real España (7)
2000–01 C	Platense (2)	Olimpia (10)	Marathón (7)	Real España (8)
2001–02 A	Motagua (10)	Marathón (6)	Olimpia (8)	Platense (7)
2001–02 C	Marathón (3)	Olimpia (11)	Victoria (7)	Platense (8)
2002–03 A	Olimpia (16)	Platense (3)	Marathón (8)	Real España (9)
2002–03 C	Marathón (4)	Motagua (7)	Real España (4)	Olimpia (3)
2003–04 A	Real España (8)	Olimpia (12)	Vida (5)	Marathón (4)
2003–04 C	Olimpia (17)	Marathón (7)	Real España (5)	Victoria (4)
2004–05 A	Marathón (5)	Olimpia (13)	Real España (6)	Victoria (5)
2004–05 C	Olimpia (18)	Marathón (8)	Universidad (2)	Platense (9)
2005–06 A	Olimpia (19)	Marathón (9)	Platense (2)	Victoria (6)
2005–06 C	Olimpia (20)	Victoria (1)	Motagua (9)	Municipal Valencia (1)
2006–07 A	Motagua (11)	Olimpia (14)	Marathón (9)	Hispano (1)
2006–07 C	Real España (9)	Marathón (10)	Olimpia (9)	Motagua (3)
2007–08 A	Marathón (6)	Motagua (8)	Olimpia (10)	Victoria (7)
2007–08 C	Olimpia (21)	Marathón (11)	Real España (7)	Motagua (4)
2008–09 A	Marathón (7)	Real España (9)	Olimpia (11)	Motagua (5)
2008–09 C	Olimpia (22)	Real España (10)	Vida (6)	Marathón (5)
2009–10 A	Marathón (8)	Olimpia (15)	Real España (8)	Motagua (6)
2009–10 C	Olimpia (23)	Motagua (9)	Vida (7)	Platense (10)
2010–11 A	Real España (10)	Olimpia (16)	Marathón (10)	Victoria (8)
2010–11 C	Motagua (12)	Olimpia (17)	Vida (8)	Marathón (6)
2011–12 A	Olimpia (24)	Real España (11)	Marathón (11)	Vida (7)
2011–12 C	Olimpia (25)	Marathón (12)	Motagua (10)	Real España (10)
2012–13 A	Olimpia (26)	Victoria (2)	Atlético Choloma (1)	Motagua (7)
2012–13 C	Olimpia (27)	Real Sociedad (1)	Platense (3)	Victoria (9)
2013–14 A	Real España (11)	Real Sociedad (2)	Deportes Savio (1)	Olimpia (3)
2013–14 C	Olimpia (28)	Marathón (13)	Real Sociedad (1)	Victoria (10)
2014–15 A	Motagua (13)	Real Sociedad (3)	Real España (9)	Olimpia (4)
2014–15 C	Olimpia (29)	Motagua (10)	Victoria (8)	Real España (11)
2015–16 A	Honduras Progreso (1)	Motagua (11)	Olimpia (12)	Vida (8)
2015–16 C	Olimpia (30)	Real Sociedad (4)	Motagua (11)	Real España(12)
2016–17 A	Motagua (14)	Platense (4)	Real España (10)	Olimpia (5)
2016–17 C	Motagua (15)	Honduras Progreso (1)	Real España (11)	Olimpia (6)
2017–18 A	Real España (12)	Motagua (12)	Olimpia (13)	Marathón (7)
2017–18 C	Marathón (9)	Motagua (13)	Olimpia (14)	Real España (13)
2018–19 A	Motagua (16)	Olimpia (18)	Real España (12)	Platense (11)
2018–19 C	Motagua (17)	Olimpia (19)	Marathón (12)	UPNFM (1)
2019–20 A	Olimpia (31)	Marathón (14)	Motagua (12)	UPNFM (2)
2019–20 C	Abandoned due to the COVID-19 pandemic.			
2020–21 A	Olimpia (32)	Marathón (15)	Motagua (13)	Vida (10)
2020–21 C	Olimpia (33)	Motagua (14)	Real España (13)	Honduras Progreso (1)
2021–22 A	Olimpia (34)	Real España (12)	Vida (2)	Motagua (17)
2021–22 C	Motagua (18)	Real España (13)	Olimpia (15)	Marathón (8)
2022–23 A	Olimpia (35)	Motagua (15)	Victoria	Marathón (9)
2022–23 C	Olimpia (36)	Olancho (1)	Real España (14)	Marathón (10)
2023–24 A	Olimpia (37)	Motagua (16)	Marathón (16)	C. D. Génesis (1)
2023–24 C	Olimpia (38)	Marathón (16)	Olimpia (16)	Real España (2)
2024–25 A	Motagua (19)	Olimpia (20)	Real España (15)	Olancho (1)
2024–25 C	Olimpia (39)	Real España (14)	Motagua (17)	Marathón (11)
2025–26 A	Olimpia (40)	Marathón (17)	Motagua (18)	Platense (12)
2025–26 C	Motagua (20)	Marathón (18)		

== Titles by club ==
=== Professional era ===
Club	Champion	Runner-up	Winning years
Olimpia	40	20	1966–67, 1967–68, 1969–70, 1971–72, 1977–78, 1982–83, 1984–85, 1986–87, 1987–88, 1989–90, 1992–93, 1995–96, 1996–97, 1998–99, 2000–01 A, 2002–03 A, 2003–04 C, 2004–05 C, 2005–06 A, 2005–06 C, 2007–08 C, 2008–09 C, 2009–10 C, 2011–12 A, 2011–12 C, 2012–13 A, 2012–13 C, 2013–14 C, 2014–15 C, 2015–16 C, 2019–20 A, 2020–21 A, 2020–21 C, 2021–22 A, 2022–23 A, 2022–23 C, 2024–25 C, 2025–26 A
Motagua	19	16	1968–69, 1970–71, 1973–74, 1978–79, 1991–92, 1997–98 A, 1997–98 C, 1999–2000 A, 1999–2000 C, 2001–02 A, 2006–07 A, 2010–11 C, 2014–15 A, 2016–17 A, 2016–17 C, 2018–19 A, 2018–19 C, 2021–22 C, 2024–25 A
Real España	12	14	1974–75, 1975–76, 1976–77, 1980–81, 1988–89, 1990–91, 1993–94, 2003–04 A, 2006–07 C, 2010–11 A, 2013–14 A, 2017–18 A
Marathón	9	17	1979–80, 1985–86, 2001–02 C, 2002–03 C, 2004–05 A, 2007–08 A, 2008–09 A, 2009–10 A, 2017–18 C
Platense	2	4	1965–66, 2000–01 C
Vida	2	3	1981–82, 1983–84
Victoria	1	2	1994–95
Honduras Progreso	1	1	2015–16 A
Real Sociedad	0	4	—
Universidad	0	2	—
Atlético Morazán	0	1	—
Petrotela	0	1	—
Olancho	0	1	—
Totals	81	81	

=== Amateur and professional eras ===
Club	Champion	Runner-up	Winning years
Olimpia	43	21	1957–58, 1958–59, 1959, 1960–61, 1961, 1963–64, 1964, 1966–67, 1967–68, 1969–70, 1971–72, 1977–78, 1982–83, 1984–85, 1986–87, 1987–88, 1989–90, 1992–93, 1995–96, 1996–97, 1998–99, 2000–01 A, 2002–03 A, 2003–04 C, 2004–05 C, 2005–06 A, 2005–06 C, 2007–08 C, 2008–09 C, 2009–10 C, 2011–12 A, 2011–12 C, 2012–13 A, 2012–13 C, 2013–14 C, 2014–15 C, 2015–16 C, 2019–20 A, 2020–21 A, 2020–21 C, 2021–22 A, 2022–23 A, 2022–23 C
Motagua	20	16	1948, 1950–51, 1968–69, 1970–71, 1973–74, 1978–79, 1991–92, 1997–98 A, 1997–98 C, 1999–2000 A, 1999–2000 C, 2001–02 A, 2006–07 A, 2010–11 C, 2014–15 A, 2016–17 A, 2016–17 C, 2018–19 A, 2018–19 C, 2021–22 C
Real España	12	15	1974–75, 1975–76, 1976–77, 1980–81, 1988–89, 1990–91, 1993–94, 2003–04 A, 2006–07 C, 2010–11 A, 2013–14 A, 2017–18 A
Marathón	9	16	1979–80, 1985–86, 2001–02 C, 2002–03 C, 2004–05 A, 2007–08 A, 2008–09 A, 2009–10 A, 2017–18 C
Vida	3	3	1962, 1981–82, 1983–84
Platense	2	5	1965–66, 2000–01 C
Victoria	2	3	1947, 1994–95
Hibueras	2	1	1949, 1955–56
Aduana	1	2	1952
Sula	1	1	1951–52
Federal	1	1	1953
Honduras Progreso	1	1	2015–16 A
Abacá	1	0	1954–55
Real Sociedad	0	4	—
Independiente	0	2	—
Universidad	0	2	—
Salamar	0	1	—
Atlético Morazán	0	1	—
Petrotela	0	1	—
Olancho	0	1	—
Totals	98	97	

=== International competitions ===
List of Honduran clubs participations at international cups

- CONCACAF Champions Cup / Champions League

Olimpia: 38 times (1962, 1967, 1968, 1970, 1971, 1972 winners, 1973, 1976, 1983, 1985 runners-up, 1987, 1988 winners, 1989, 1990, 1994, 1996, 1997, 1998, 1999, 2000 runners-up, 2002, 2005, 2006, 2007, 2008–09, 2009–10, 2010–11, 2011–12, 2012–13, 2013–14, 2014–15, 2015–16, 2016–17, 2018, 2020, 2021, 2023, 2026)

Motagua: 21 times (1969, 1971, 1974, 1975, 1977, 1983, 1986, 1991, 1992, 1993, 1995, 2003, 2008, 2010–11, 2011–12, 2015–16, 2018, 2020, 2022, 2023, 2025)

Real España: 18 times (1975, 1976, 1977, 1981, 1987, 1989, 1990, 1991, 1992, 1993, 1995, 1997, 2000, 2009–10, 2011–12, 2014–15, 2023, 2026)

Marathón: 11 times (1974, 1980, 1981, 1986, 1988, 2008–09, 2009–10, 2010–11, 2012–13, 2019, 2021)

Vida: 6 times (1963, 1972, 1973, 1982, 1984, 1985)

Universidad: 2 times (1980 runners-up, 1984)

Victoria: 2 times (1996, 2013–14)

Petrotela: 1 time (1994)

Platense: 1 time (1998)

Honduras Progreso: 1 time (2016–17)

- CONCACAF Central American Cup

Olimpia: 3 times (2023, 2024, 2025)

Motagua: 3 times (2023, 2024, 2025)

Real España: 2 times (2023, 2025)

Olancho: 1 time (2023)

Marathón: 1 time (2024)

- CONCACAF League (defunct)

Olimpia: 5 times (2017 winners, 2019, 2020, 2021, 2022)

Motagua: 5 times (2018 runners-up, 2019 runners-up, 2020, 2021 runners-up, 2022)

Marathón: 3 times (2019, 2020, 2021)

Real España: 2 times (2018, 2022)

Honduras Progreso: 1 time (2017)

Platense: 1 time (2017)

- Copa Fraternidad / Torneo Grandes de Centroamerica / UNCAF Interclub Cup (defunct)

Olimpia: 13 times (1979, 1981 winners, 1996 withdrew, 1997, 1998, 1999 winners, 2000 winners, 2001, 2003, 2004, 2005 runners-up, 2006 runners-up, 2007)

Motagua: 8 times (1979, 1996 withdrew, 1997, 1998, 1999, 2001, 2002, 2007 winners)

Marathón: 7 times (1980, 1981, 1982, 2002, 2003, 2005, 2006)

Real España: 6 times (1981, 1982 winners, 1998, 2000, 2004, 2007)

Vida: 2 times (1981, 1982)

Broncos: 1 time (1980 winners)

Victoria: 1 time (2006)

- CONCACAF Cup Winners Cup / Giants Cup (defunct)

Olimpia: 2 times (1996 abandoned), (1997 abandoned)

Platense: 2 times (1997 abandoned), (1998 abandoned)

Real España: 1 time (1993 runners-up)

Real Maya: 1 time (1994)

Marathón: 1 time (1995)

Motagua: 1 time (2001)

- Copa Interamericana (defunct)

Olimpia: 2 times (1972 runners-up), (1988 runners-up)

- Copa Sudamericana

Motagua: 1 time (2008)

- FIFA Club World Cup

Olimpia: 1 time (2001 canceled)

== See also ==
- List of Honduran Liga Nacional top scorers
- Honduran Liga Nacional Reserves
- Honduran Liga Nacional de Ascenso
- Honduran Liga Mayor
- Honduran Amateur League
- Honduran Cup
- Honduran Supercup
