= Ángel Paz (Honduran footballer) =

Honduran footballer (1950-2008)

Personal information
- Full name: Ángel Ramón Paz Rápalo
- Date of birth: 28 October 1950
- Place of birth: Tela, Honduras
- Date of death: 4 November 2008 (aged 58)
- Position: Midfielder

Senior career*
Years	Team	Apps	(Gls)
1965–1969	Real Juventud		
1969–1978	Olimpia	109	(9)

International career
	Honduras	9	(0)
- * Club domestic league appearances and goals

Ángel Ramón Paz Rápalo (28 October 1950 – 4 November 2008) was a Honduran footballer, who played for Olimpia and Real Juventud.

== Club career ==
Nicknamed Mon, his debut in the Honduran league was on 22 June 1969 scoring one of the goals against Atlético Indio in the 3–0 victory.

== International career ==
He has represented his country in two FIFA World Cup qualification matches and amassed 9 caps for Honduras.

== Death ==
He died of stomach cancer on 4 November 2008.
