= Jimmy Steward =

Honduran footballer (born 1946)

Personal information
- Full name: James Steward Bodden
- Date of birth: 9 December 1946 (age 79)
- Place of birth: Honduras
- Position: Goalkeeper

Senior career*
Years	Team	Apps	(Gls)
1965–1975	Platense	140	(0)
1975–1981	Real España	159	(0)
1981–1982	Marathón		(0)

International career
1973–1982	Honduras	6	(0)
- * Club domestic league appearances and goals

James Steward Bodden (born 9 December 1946) is a Honduran football goalkeeper who played for Honduras in the 1982 FIFA World Cup.

== Club career ==
Steward started his career at Platense and then left them citing bad eyesight only to sign for Real España.

== International career ==
He has represented his country in 5 FIFA World Cup qualification matches, being part of the team during the qualifiers in Haiti in 1973.
