= 1968–69 C.D. Motagua season =

Motagua
1968–69 season
- Chairman: Pedro Atala Simón
- Manager: Juan Colecchio; Américo Brunner; Rodolfo Godoy
- League: Winner
- Cup: Winner
- Top goalscorer: Abrussezze (16)
Home colours	Away colours
- All statistics correct as of 25 September 2011.

The 1968–69 C.D. Motagua season was F.C. Motagua's 4th season in the Honduran Liga Nacional and the 18th overall. Motagua was able to achieve both domestic League and Cup, thus becoming the first Honduran club to win a double.

== League ==
After three seasons of poor performance, the club strengthened its squad with well talented Brazilian players, one of them being Roberto Abrussezze who finished top goal-scorer at the end of the season. On 9 March 1969, Motagua secured its first ever professional national championship in the 1–1 draw against all-time archrivals C.D. Olimpia; that result made them unreachable in the standings.

=== Squad ===
- All data is updated prior the beginning of the season.

No.	Pos.	Player	DoB	Caps	Goals
1	GK	(Nicaragua) Salvador Dubois	16 August 1935 (aged 32)	–	0
2	DF	(Honduras) Lenard Welsh	13 November 1935 (aged 32)	–	–
3	DF	(Honduras) Marco Banegas	–	–	–
4	DF	(Honduras) Elio Banegas	–	–	–
5	DF	(Honduras) Roberto Jerez	–	–	–
6	FW	(Brazil) Abrussezze	29 March 1948 (aged 20)	–	–
7	FW	(Brazil) Geraldo Baptista	–	–	–
8	MF	(Honduras) Pedro Colón	–	–	–
9	–	(Honduras) Fermín Navarro	–	–	–
10	FW	(Honduras) Óscar Hernández	10 June 1950 (aged 17)	–	–
11	DF	(Honduras) Nelson Benavídez	–	–	–
12	–	(Honduras) Julio Meza	–	–	–
13	DF	(Honduras) Alfonso Navarro	–	–	–
14	–	(Brazil) Yaponá de Souza	–	0	0
15	FW	(Brazil) Pedro da Silva	–	0	0
16	–	(Honduras) Jesús Castillo	–	–	–
17	MF	(Honduras) Rubén Guifarro	15 October 1946 (aged 21)	–	–
18	FW	(Honduras) Mario Blandón	–	0	0
19	–	Rino Fanconi	–	–	–
20	–	(Honduras) Mariano Godoy	–	–	–
21	–	(Honduras) Juan Ramos	–	–	–
22	–	(Honduras) Marco González	–	–	–
23	–	(Brazil) Linauro di Paula	–	0	0

==== Transfer in ====
No.	Pos.	Player	Moving from
7	FW	(Brazil) Geraldo Baptista	–
14	–	(Brazil) Yaponá de Souza	–
15	FW	(Brazil) Pedro da Silva	–
18	FW	(Honduras) Mario Blandón	none
23	FW	(Brazil) Linauro di Paula	–

=== Standings ===
Pos	Team	Pld	W	D	L	GF	GA	GD	Pts	Qualification or relegation
1	Motagua (Note: Motagua champions as regular season winner.) (C)	27	17	5	5	45	23	+22	39	Qualified to the 1969 CONCACAF Champions' Cup
2	Olimpia (Note: Olimpia runner-up as finishing second.)	27	14	8	5	45	20	+25	36	
3	Platense	27	15	6	6	40	21	+19	36	
4	Atlético Indio	27	12	10	5	34	24	+10	34	
5	España	27	9	7	11	37	30	+7	25	

(C) Champions

=== Matches ===
==== Friendlies ====
13 October 1968 Friendly	Motagua (Honduras)	1–1	(Mexico) Guadalajara	Tegucigalpa
CST	Hernández 1'		22' (o.g.) de Souza	Stadium: Estadio Tiburcio Carías Andino

17 October 1968 Friendly	Motagua (Honduras)	0–0	(Mexico) León	Tegucigalpa
CST				Stadium: Estadio Tiburcio Carías Andino

12 December 1968 Friendly	Motagua	1–0	Atlético Indio	Tegucigalpa
CST	Artica 42'			Stadium: Estadio Tiburcio Carías Andino

15 December 1968 Friendly	Motagua (Honduras)	1–1	(Mexico) Pachuca	Tegucigalpa
CST	Banegas 5'		22' dos Santos	Stadium: Estadio Tiburcio Carías Andino

17 December 1968 Friendly	Motagua	1–0	Olimpia	Tegucigalpa
CST	Banegas 50'			Stadium: Estadio Tiburcio Carías Andino

25 May 1969 Friendly	Motagua (Honduras)	0–1	(Mexico) Necaxa	Tegucigalpa
CST			Frías	Stadium: Estadio Tiburcio Carías Andino

==== Regular season ====
Some matches missing, will include when available.

7 April 1968 Week 1	Motagua	1–0	Platense	Tegucigalpa
16:00 CST	Abrussezze			Stadium: Estadio Nacional

18 April 1968 Week 2	Motagua	2–1	Marathón	Tegucigalpa
CST	Abrussezze; Banegas			Stadium: Estadio Nacional

21 April 1968 Week 3	España	1–1	Motagua	San Pedro Sula
CST			da Silva	Stadium: Estadio General Francisco Morazán
Note: Pedro da Silva scored his first goal for the club.

23 May 1968 Round 7	Motagua	1–0	Olimpia	Tegucigalpa, Francisco Morazán
16:00 CST	Cárcamo (?)			Stadium: Estadio Tiburcio Carías Andino

16 June 1968 Round ?	Motagua	1–1	España	Tegucigalpa, Francisco Morazán
16:00 CST				Stadium: Estadio Tiburcio Carías Andino

11 August 1968 Round ?	Marathón	2–2	Motagua	San Pedro Sula, Cortés
CST				Stadium: Estadio Francisco Morazán

18 August 1968 Round ?	Victoria	0–3	Motagua	La Ceiba, Atlántida
CST				Stadium: Estadio Nilmo Edwards

8 September 1968 Round 16	Olimpia	0–2	Motagua	Tegucigalpa, Francisco Morazán
16:00 CST			Hernández; Abrussezze	Stadium: Estadio Tiburcio Carías Andino

9 March 1969 Round ?	Motagua	1–1	Olimpia	Tegucigalpa, Francisco Morazán
16:00 CST	Abrussezze	Report	Gómez	Stadium: Estadio Tiburcio Carías Andino; Referee: Tomás Álvarez Starting XI: 1 – Dubois; 2 – Welsh; 3 – Banegas; 6 – Abrussezze; 7 – Baptista; 10 – Hernández; 11 – Benavídez; 12 – Meza; 13 – Navarro; 15 – da Silva; 17 – Guifarro; Substitutes; 5 – Jerez (substituted on)

23 March 1969 Round ?	Motagua	0–1	Honduras	Tegucigalpa, Francisco Morazán
CST				Stadium: Estadio Tiburcio Carías Andino

Round ?	Motagua	3–2	Victoria	Tegucigalpa, Francisco Morazán
CST				Stadium: Estadio Tiburcio Carías Andino

Round ?	Motagua	0–1	Victoria	Tegucigalpa, Francisco Morazán
CST				Stadium: Estadio Tiburcio Carías Andino

Round ?	Platense	0–4	Motagua	Puerto Cortés, Cortés
CST				Stadium: Estadio Excélsior

== Cup ==
The 1968 Honduran Cup was the first knock-out tournament played in Honduran football, Motagua were seeded in Group A along Atlético Indio, C.D. Atlético Español, C.D. Olimpia and C.D. Victoria from which they advanced to the semifinals; once there, they faced Atlético Indio who defeated 1–0. On 22 December 1968, Motagua captured its first official cup by overcoming C.D. España on penalty shoot-outs in the final match at Estadio General Francisco Morazán in San Pedro Sula.

=== Matches ===
==== Semifinal ====
19 December 1968 Semifinal	Motagua	1–0	Atlético Indio	Tegucigalpa
	Baptista 55'			Stadium: Estadio Tiburcio Carías Andino

==== Final ====
22 December 1968 Final	España	2–2 (1–2 p)	Motagua	San Pedro Sula
	Greenech 59' 65'		44' Baptista; 61' Godoy	Stadium: Estadio General Francisco Morazán
	Penalties
	Hidalgo (penalty scored) (penalty missed) (penalty missed)		(penalty scored) (penalty scored) (penalty missed) Banegas
