= 2004–05 C.D. Motagua season =

Motagua
2004–05 season
- Chairman: Pedro Atala
- Manager: Carlos Jurado; Hernaín Arzú; Edwin Pavón
- Apertura: 9th
- Clausura: 5th
Home colours
- All statistics correct as of 7 May 2005.

The 2004–05 season was F.C. Motagua's 54th season in existence and the club's 39th consecutive season in the top flight of Honduran football.

== Overview ==
F.C. Motagua started the Apertura tournament under the management of Uruguayan coach Carlos Jurado. Jurado was sacked after nine rounds due to poor results. Former defender Hernaín Arzú was named as the replacement, who stayed until the end of the season. However, he was unable to right the ship, finishing in the 9th position for the first time since 1966.

For the Clausura tournament, the club hired manager Edwin Pavón and kept Hernaín Arzú as his assistant. For the fourth time in a row, Motagua was unable to enter the playoffs.

== Players ==
No.	Pos.	Player name	Date of birth and age
7	MF	(Honduras) Víctor Mena	2 August 1980 (aged 23)
16	MF	(Honduras) Edy Vásquez	31 October 1983 (aged 20)
23	DF	(Honduras) Mario Chirinos	29 July 1978 (aged 25)
26	MF	(Argentina) Diego de Rosa	—
–	GK	(Honduras) Henry Enamorado	24 May 1982 (aged 22)
–	GK	(Honduras) Rony García	—
–	GK	(Honduras) Donaldo Morales	13 October 1982 (aged 21)
–	GK	(Honduras) Noel Valladares	3 May 1977 (aged 27)
–	DF	(Honduras) Máximo Arzú	17 July 1979 (aged 24)
–	DF	(Honduras) Víctor Bernárdez	24 May 1982 (aged 22)
–	DF	(Argentina) Néstor Holweger	22 June 1972 (aged 32)
–	DF	(Honduras) Emilio Izaguirre	10 May 1986 (aged 18)
–	DF	(Honduras) Júnior Izaguirre	12 August 1979 (aged 24)
–	DF	(Honduras) Luis López	—
–	DF	(Honduras) Elmer Montoya	10 December 1977 (aged 26)
–	DF	(Honduras) Roy Posas	14 March 1984 (aged 20)
–	DF	(Honduras) Juan Raudales	15 July 1979 (aged 24)
–	DF	(Honduras) Milton Reyes	2 May 1974 (aged 30)
–	DF	(Honduras) Luis Santamaría	22 November 1975 (aged 28)
–	DF	(Honduras) Lín Zelaya	—
–	MF	(Honduras) Mauricio Castro	11 August 1981 (aged 22)
–	MF	(Uruguay) Marcelo Dapueto	29 July 1974 (aged 29)
–	MF	(Honduras) Derick Hulse	4 April 1982 (aged 22)
–	MF	(Honduras) Rubén Matamoros	19 August 1982 (aged 21)
–	MF	(Honduras) Nery Medina	5 August 1981 (aged 22)
–	MF	(Honduras) Carlos Salinas	20 September 1978 (aged 25)
–	MF	(Honduras) Abidán Solís	10 July 1984 (aged 19)
–	MF	(Honduras) Juan Tablada	—
–	FW	(Honduras) Mitchel Brown	16 July 1981 (aged 22)
–	FW	(Honduras) Pompilio Cacho	22 December 1976 (aged 27)
–	FW	(Honduras) Pedro Fernández	30 November 1982 (aged 21)
–	FW	(Uruguay) Óscar Garrasino	1 January 1977 (aged 27)
–	FW	(Honduras) Jairo Martínez	14 May 1978 (aged 26)
–	FW	(El Salvador) Diego Mejía	20 June 1982 (aged 22)
–	FW	(Argentina) José Pacini	8 June 1976 (aged 28)
–	FW	(Honduras) Luis Rodas	3 January 1985 (aged 19)

== Results ==
=== Apertura ===
7 August 2004 Week 1	Universidad	1–3	Motagua	Tegucigalpa
17:30	Pérez 43'		4' Montoya; 55' Martínez; 90+1' Brown	Stadium: Estadio Tiburcio Carías Andino; Referee: Manuel Cruz

14 August 2004 Week 2	Victoria	2–0	Motagua	La Ceiba
19:30	Bennett 64' 74'			Stadium: Estadio Nilmo Edwards

20 August 2004 Week 3	Real España	2–0	Motagua	San Pedro Sula
19:30	Vallecillo 63'; Santana 69'			Stadium: Estadio Olímpico Metropolitano; Attendance: 794; Referee: Lucinio Rodríguez

25 August 2004 Week 4	Marathón	0–0	Motagua	San Pedro Sula
19:00				Stadium: Estadio Olímpico Metropolitano; Attendance: 1,845; Referee: Ricardo Zelaya

28 August 2004 Week 5	Motagua	2–1	Atlético Olanchano	Tegucigalpa
19:00	Holweger 52'; Medina 77'		79' Costa	Stadium: Estadio Tiburcio Carías Andino

1 September 2004 Week 6	Motagua	2–0	Platense	Tegucigalpa
18:00	Solís 48'; Medina 76'			Stadium: Estadio Tiburcio Carías Andino; Attendance: 746; Referee: Óscar Bardales

12 September 2004 Week 7	Motagua	0–1	Olimpia	Tegucigalpa
16:00			5' Velásquez	Stadium: Estadio Tiburcio Carías Andino; Attendance: 10,885; Referee: José Pineda Starting XI: Valladares; Medina; J. Izaguirre; V. Bernárdez; Fernández (substituted off) 65'; E. Izaguirre (substituted off) 46'; Solís (substituted off) 75'; Tablada; García; Rodas; R. Bernárdez; Substitutes; Cacho (substituted in) 46'; Arzú (substituted in) 65'; Brown (substituted in) 75'

16 September 2004 Week 8	Motagua	1–1	Municipal Valencia	Tegucigalpa
19:00	Montoya		Castro	Stadium: Estadio Tiburcio Carías Andino

19 September 2004 Week 9	Motagua	1–2	Vida	Tegucigalpa
16:00	Suárez 58' (o.g.)		30' Hernández; 84' de Rosa	Stadium: Estadio Tiburcio Carías Andino; Attendance: 1,156; Referee: Carlos Luna Starting XI: Valladares; Bernárdez; Holweger; Montoya; Mena; Medina; Arzú; Hulse; Solís; Izaguirre; Mejía; Substitutes; Enamorado (substituted in); Rodas (substituted in); Brown (substituted in)

26 September 2004 Week 10	Motagua	2–0	Universidad	Tegucigalpa
16:00	Montoya 36'; Cacho 73'			Stadium: Estadio Tiburcio Carías Andino; Attendance: 1,455; Referee: José Molina Starting XI: Enamorado; Medina; Bernárdez; Montoya; Vásquez (substituted off); Tablada; Hulse (substituted off); Mena; Arzú; Mejía (substituted off); Cacho; Substitutes; Brown (substituted in); Rodas (substituted in); Izaguirre (substituted in)

29 September 2004 Week 11	Motagua	3–4	Victoria	Tegucigalpa
19:00	Bernárdez; Cacho; Rodas		56' Ramírez; 88' (pen.) Bennett	Stadium: Estadio Tiburcio Carías Andino; Referee: Marcio Carranza Starting XI: Enamorado; Ó. Bernardez; Medina; Montoya (substituted off); Mena; Cacho; Arzú; Hulse; Tablada; Vásquez (substituted off); Martínez (substituted off); Substitutes; C. Bernárdez (substituted in); Holweger (substituted in); Rodas (substituted in)

3 October 2004 Week 12	Motagua	0–1	Real España	Tegucigalpa
16:00			Pacini	Stadium: Estadio Tiburcio Carías Andino

4 November 2004 Week 13	Motagua	1–1	Marathón	Tegucigalpa
19:00	Hulse 31'		77' Simovic	Stadium: Estadio Tiburcio Carías Andino

17 October 2004 Week 14	Atlético Olanchano	2–2	Motagua	Catacamas
13:00	Lalín 82'; Costa 86'		Martínez; Rodas	Stadium: Estadio Rubén Guifarro

24 October 2004 Week 15	Platense	2–0	Motagua	Puerto Cortés
15:00	Sánchez 16'; Ramírez 79'			Stadium: Estadio Excélsior

31 October 2004 Week 16	Olimpia	3–1	Motagua	Tegucigalpa
16:00	Scott		13' Mena	Stadium: Estadio Tiburcio Carías Andino

7 November 2004 Week 17	Municipal Valencia	1–1	Motagua	Choluteca
15:00	Soto 60' (pen.)		55' Cacho	Stadium: Estadio Fausto Flores Lagos; Referee: Mario Moncada

14 November 2004 Week 18	Vida	1–1	Motagua	La Ceiba
15:00	Paradiso		88' Mejía	Stadium: Estadio Nilmo Edwards

=== Clausura ===
23 January 2005 Week 1	Universidad	0–0	Motagua	Comayagua
				Stadium: Estadio Carlos Miranda

29 January 2005 Week 2	Vida	1–3	Motagua	La Ceiba
			Salinas	Stadium: Estadio Nilmo Edwards

2 February 2005 Week 3	Motagua	0–0	Olimpia	Tegucigalpa
19:30				Stadium: Estadio Tiburcio Carías Andino

5 February 2005 Week 4	Marathón	3–1	Motagua	San Pedro Sula
19:30	Martínez ?' (pen.); Simovic; Núñez		Garrasino	Stadium: Estadio Olímpico Metropolitano; Referee: Lucinio Rodríguez

12 February 2005 Week 5	Motagua	0–0	Municipal Valencia	Tegucigalpa
				Stadium: Estadio Tiburcio Carías Andino

16 February 2005 Week 6	Motagua	1–1	Platense	Tegucigalpa
	Santamaría			Stadium: Estadio Tiburcio Carías Andino

2 March 2005 Week 7	Real España	1–0	Motagua	San Pedro Sula

6 March 2005 Week 8	Motagua	2–2	Atlético Olanchano	Tegucigalpa
	Garrasino		68' Costa; 80' Morán	Stadium: Estadio Tiburcio Carías Andino

13 March 2005 Week 9	Motagua	2–1	Victoria	Tegucigalpa
				Stadium: Estadio Tiburcio Carías Andino

20 March 2005 Week 10	Motagua	0–0	Universidad	Tegucigalpa
				Stadium: Estadio Tiburcio Carías Andino

30 March 2005 Week 11	Motagua	1–1	Vida	Tegucigalpa
				Stadium: Estadio Tiburcio Carías Andino

3 April 2005 Week 12	Olimpia	2–0	Motagua	Tegucigalpa
	Turcios; Cárcamo			Stadium: Estadio Tiburcio Carías Andino

10 April 2005 Week 13	Motagua	1–1	Marathón	Tegucigalpa
16:00			Simovic	Stadium: Estadio Tiburcio Carías Andino

17 April 2005 Week 14	Municipal Valencia	0–1	Motagua

23 April 2005 Week 15	Platense	0–0	Motagua	Puerto Cortés
				Stadium: Estadio Excélsior

28 April 2005 Week 16	Motagua	2–1	Real España	Tegucigalpa
	Izaguirre ?' (pen.)			Stadium: Estadio Tiburcio Carías Andino

1 May 2005 Week 17	Atlético Olanchano	2–2	Motagua	Catacamas
				Stadium: Estadio Rubén Guifarro

7 May 2005 Week 18	Victoria	2–2	Motagua	La Ceiba
				Stadium: Estadio Nilmo Edwards

=== By round ===
Round	1	2	3	4	5	6	7	8	9	10	11	12	13	14	15	16	17	18	19	20	21	22	23	24	25	26	27	28	29	30	31	32	33	34	35	36
Ground	A	A	A	A	H	H	H	H	H	H	H	H	H	A	A	A	A	A	A	A	H	A	H	H	A	H	H	H	H	A	H	A	A	H	A	A
Result	W	L	L	D	W	W	L	D	L	W	L	L	D	D	L	L	D	D	D	W	D	L	D	D	L	D	W	D	D	L	D	W	D	W	D	D
Position	2	5	7	6	6	3	4	5	7	5	6	6	7	8	8	9	9	9	8	6	6	6	6	6	7	7	6	6	7	7	7	7	7	7	7	7

A = Away; H = Home; W = Win; D = Draw; L = Loss

== Statistics ==
- As of 7 May 2005

Competition	GP	GW	GD	GL	GS	GC	GD	CS	SG	Per
League	36	8	17	11	38	43	–5	9	13	37.96%
