= 2005–06 C.D. Motagua season =

Motagua
2005–06 season
- Chairman: Pedro Atala
- Manager: Ramón Maradiaga
- Apertura: 10th
- Clausura: Semifinalist
Home colours
- All statistics correct as of 14 May 2006.

The 2005–06 season was F.C. Motagua's 55th season in existence and the club's 40th consecutive season in the top fight of Honduran football.

== Overview ==
After a disastrous first half of the season where the team finished last, in the Clausura tournament they were able to overcome and avoid relegation.

== Squad ==
No.	Pos.	Player name	Date of birth and age
4	DF	(Honduras) Júnior Izaguirre	12 August 1979 (aged 25)
16	MF	(Honduras) Edy Vásquez	31 October 1983 (aged 21)
20	MF	(Honduras) Amado Guevara	2 May 1976 (aged 29)
–	DF	(Honduras) Milton Reyes	2 May 1974 (aged 31)
–	DF	(Honduras) Víctor Bernárdez	24 May 1982 (aged 23)
–	MF	(Honduras) Carlos Salinas	20 September 1978 (aged 26)
–	MF	(Brazil) Diogo Fernandes	15 December 1985 (aged 19)
–	FW	(Brazil) Marcelo Ferreira	7 October 1975 (aged 29)
–	FW	(Brazil) Pedro Santana	8 February 1973 (aged 32)
–	FW	(Uruguay) Óscar Torlacoff	22 December 1973 (aged 31)
–	FW	(Honduras) Elvis Scott	1 August 1978 (aged 26)
–	FW	(Honduras) Jerry Palacios	1 November 1981 (aged 23)

== Results ==
=== Preseason and friendlies ===
4 January 2006 Friendly	Real España	2–1	Motagua	San Pedro Sula, Cortés
CST

5 January 2006 Friendly	Victoria	5–2	Motagua	La Ceiba, Atlántida
CST				Stadium: Estadio Nilmo Edwards

8 January 2006 Friendly	Motagua (Honduras)	5–3	(Costa Rica) Alajuelense	Comayagua, Honduras
11:00 CST	Ferreira 14'; Scott 60' 65'; Izaguirre 84' (pen.); Santana 87'		12' Ruiz; 25' Martínez; 72' Jiménez	Stadium: Estadio Carlos Miranda; Attendance: 2,636

=== Apertura ===
6 August 2005 Round 1	Vida	1–1	Motagua	La Ceiba, Atlántida
19:30 CST				Stadium: Estadio Nilmo Edwards

14 August 2005 Round 2	Motagua	0–1	Universidad	Tegucigalpa, Francisco Morazán
16:00 CST				Stadium: Estadio Tiburcio Carías Andino

21 August 2005 Round 3	Municipal Valencia	2–2	Motagua	Choluteca, Choluteca
CST	Valladares; Funes		Ferreira	Stadium: Estadio Fausto Flores Lagos

25 August 2005 Round 4	Motagua	3–0	Marathón	Tegucigalpa, Francisco Morazán
CST				Stadium: Estadio Tiburcio Carías Andino

28 August 2005 Round 5	Victoria	4–1	Motagua	La Ceiba, Atlántida
CST	Maradiaga 48'; Morán 52' 65'; Rosales 87'		70' Santamaría	Stadium: Estadio Nilmo Edwards

4 September 2005 Round 6	Motagua	1–1	Olimpia	Tegucigalpa, Francisco Morazán
16:00 CST				Stadium: Estadio Tiburcio Carías Andino

11 September 2005 Round 7	Real España	2–0	Motagua	San Pedro Sula, Cortés
CST

25 September 2005 Round 8	Motagua	2–1	Platense	Tegucigalpa, Francisco Morazán
CST				Stadium: Estadio Tiburcio Carías Andino

28 September 2005 Round 9	Motagua	1–2	Hispano	Tegucigalpa, Francisco Morazán
CST				Stadium: Estadio Tiburcio Carías Andino

2 October 2005 Round 10	Motagua	1–0	Vida	Tegucigalpa, Francisco Morazán
CST				Stadium: Estadio Tiburcio Carías Andino

9 October 2005 Round 11	Universidad	2–1	Motagua
CST

16 October 2005 Round 12	Motagua	0–0	Municipal Valencia	Tegucigalpa, Francisco Morazán
CST				Stadium: Estadio Tiburcio Carías Andino

22 October 2005 Round 13	Marathón	3–2	Motagua	San Pedro Sula, Cortés
CST

9 November 2005 Round 14	Motagua	0–2	Victoria	Tegucigalpa, Francisco Morazán
CST				Stadium: Estadio Tiburcio Carías Andino

6 November 2005 Round 15	Olimpia	1–0	Motagua	Tegucigalpa, Francisco Morazán
CST				Stadium: Estadio Tiburcio Carías Andino

13 November 2005 Round 16	Motagua	0–1	Real España	Tegucigalpa, Francisco Morazán
CST				Stadium: Estadio Tiburcio Carías Andino

16 November 2005 Round 17	Platense	2–0	Motagua	Puerto Cortés, Cortés
CST				Stadium: Estadio Excelsior

24 November 2005 Round 18	Hispano	1–1	Motagua
CST

=== Clausura ===
22 January 2006 Round 1	Motagua	2–0	Platense	Danlí, El Paraíso
CST	Scott 21'; Santana 87'			Stadium: Estadio Marcelo Tinoco

28 January 2006 Round 2	Hispano	0–2	Motagua	Comayagua, Comayagua
CST			21' Scott; 85' Santana	Stadium: Estadio Carlos Miranda

4 February 2006 Round 3	Marathón	4–0	Motagua	San Pedro Sula, Cortés
CST	Oliva 25'; Ramírez 74' (pen.); Zepeda 84'; Cacho 90+'

12 February 2006 Round 4	Motagua	3–0	Victoria	Danlí, El Paraíso
CST	Vásquez 10'; Santana 49'; Ferreira 60'			Stadium: Estadio Marcelo Tinoco

19 February 2006 Round 5	Olimpia	0–1	Motagua	Comayagua, Comayagua
CST			53' Santana	Stadium: Estadio Carlos Miranda

19 March 2006 Round 6	Universidad	1–1	Motagua
CST	Martínez 24'		57' Palacios

5 March 2006 Round 7	Motagua	0–1	Real España
CST			80' (pen.) Días

11 March 2006 Round 8	Vida	1–2	Motagua	La Ceiba, Atlántida
19:30 CST	Salinas 51' (pen.)		6' Santana; Vásquez	Stadium: Estadio Nilmo Edwards

15 March 2006 Round 9	Motagua	1–0	Municipal Valencia	Tegucigalpa, Francisco Morazán
CST	Santana 33' (pen.)			Stadium: Estadio Tiburcio Carías Andino

25 March 2006 Round 10	Platense	2–1	Motagua	Puerto Cortés, Cortés
19:30 CST	Costa 45' 72' (pen.)		70' de Souza	Stadium: Estadio Excelsior

2 April 2006 Round 11	Motagua	2–2	Hispano	Tegucigalpa, Francisco Morazán
16:00 CST	Ferreira 8'; Bernárdez 80'		56' (pen.) Soto; 72' Vargas	Stadium: Estadio Tiburcio Carías Andino

9 April 2006 Round 12	Motagua	3–1	Marathón	Tegucigalpa, Francisco Morazán
16:00 CST				Stadium: Estadio Tiburcio Carías Andino

12 April 2006 Round 13	Victoria	2–2	Motagua	La Ceiba, Atlántida
CST				Stadium: Estadio Nilmo Edwards

20 April 2006 Round 14	Motagua	1–1	Universidad	Tegucigalpa, Francisco Morazán
19:30 CST				Stadium: Estadio Tiburcio Carías Andino

23 April 2006 Round 15	Motagua	0–1	Olimpia	Tegucigalpa, Francisco Morazán
16:00 CST			35' Bonilla	Stadium: Estadio Tiburcio Carías Andino; Attendance: 17,528

26 April 2006 Round 16	Real España	1–1	Motagua	San Pedro Sula, Cortés
19:30 CST

30 April 2006 Round 17	Motagua	2–1	Vida	Tegucigalpa, Francisco Morazán
15:00 CST	Palacios; Torlacoff			Stadium: Estadio Tiburcio Carías Andino

7 May 2006 Round 18	Municipal Valencia	2–0	Motagua	Choluteca, Choluteca
CST				Stadium: Estadio Fausto Flores Lagos

11 May 2006 Semifinals	Motagua	2–1	Olimpia	Tegucigalpa, Francisco Morazán
19:30 CST	Reyes; Torlacoff		Emílio	Stadium: Estadio Tiburcio Carías Andino

14 May 2006 Semifinals	Olimpia	2–1	Motagua	Tegucigalpa, Francisco Morazán
16:00 CST	Emílio		90+' Torlacoff	Stadium: Estadio Tiburcio Carías Andino
