= Avelino v. Cuenco =

Philippine Supreme Court case ruling

- Court: Supreme Court of the Philippines en banc

Full case name
- Jose Avelino vs. Mariano Cuenco
- Decided: March 4 1949
- G.R. number: L-2821
- Citation: 83 Phil. 17
- Cases cited: Alejandrino vs. Quezon, 46 Phil., 83; Vera vs. Avelino, 77 Phil., 192; Mabanag vs. Lopez Vito, 78 Phil., 1; Werts vs. Rogers; Missouri Pac. vs. Kansas, 63 Law ed. [U. S.], p. 239).

Case history
- Prior action(s): None; for quo warranto petitions the Supreme Court is always the court of first instance
- Argument: Oral argument

Questions presented
- a. Does the Court have jurisdiction over the subject matter? b. If it has, were resolutions Nos. 68 and 67 validly approved? c. Should the petition be granted?

Ruling
- a. Court has no jurisdiction (6–4) b. Resolutions were not validly approved (4–4, 2 not voting) c. Court dismisses the petition (6–4)

Court membership
- Judge(s) sitting: Manuel Moran (CJ), Manuel Briones, Gregorio Perfecto, Ricardo Paras, Felicisimo Feria, Pedro Tuason, Guillermo Pablo, Alejandro Reyes, Marcelino Montemayor, César Bengzon, Sabino Padilla
- Concur/dissent: Moran, Perfecto
- Dissent: Perfecto, Briones, Tuason

Laws applied
- 1935 Constitution of the Philippines

Area of law
- Constitutional law, political law

Avelino v. Cuenco, 83 Phil. 17 (1949), is a ruling of the Supreme Court of the Philippines handed down on March 4, 1949. The ruling stemmed from a dispute about the presidency of the Senate between senators José Avelino and Mariano Jesús Cuenco, and also clarified the constitutional majority required for the Senate to hold a session.

== Background ==
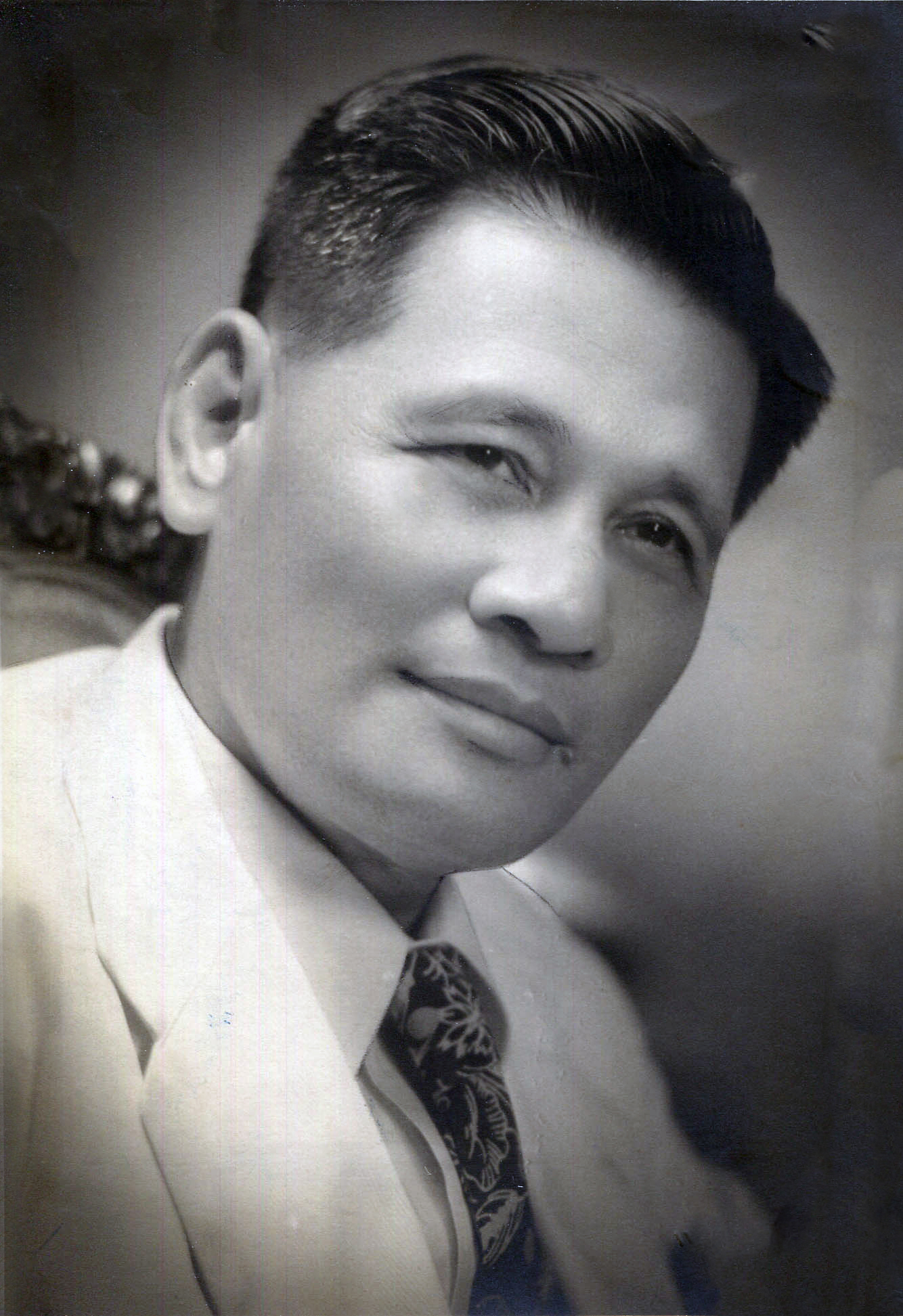
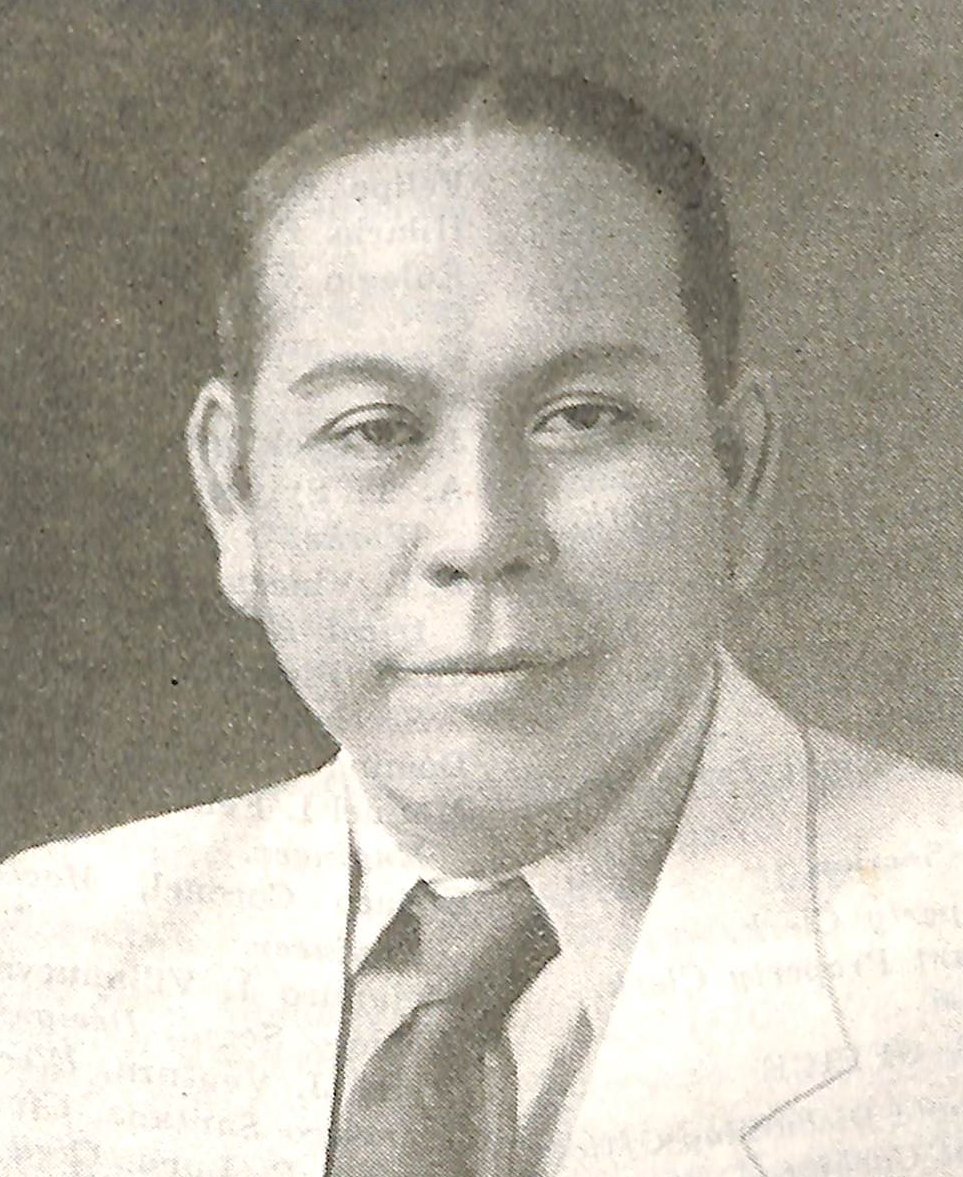
Senators José Avelino and Mariano Jesús Cuenco

The case was a result of a leadership crisis in the Senate, which occurred during the 1st Congress of the Philippines. On February 18, 1949, Senator Lorenzo Tañada intended to speak before the Senate and calling for an investigation into Senate President José Avelino's involvement with graft and corruption. Avelino arrived at 11:35 a.m., more than an hour after enough senators were present to constitute a quorum, but delayed opening the session as he conferred with his allies.

The session opened with 22 senators (out of 24); Senator Vicente Sotto was on medical leave, while Senator Tomás Confesor was in the United States. Tañada attempted to speak but was unsuccessful as Avelino and his allies employed several tactics to delay him, including Avelino denying him the floor several times.

Senator Pablo Ángeles David moved for the adjournment of the session, which was opposed by Senators Prospero Sanidad and Mariano Jesús Cuenco. In spite of this, Avelino banged his gavel and left the session hall with nine other senators. With only 12 senators left, Senator Melecio Arranz took over as presiding officer. The remaining senators then voted Cuenco as the acting presiding office, and finally permitted Tañada to deliver his speech. After the speech, the senators passed Resolution 68, which called for an investigation on Avelino. Then they passed Resolution 67 which declared a vacancy in the Senate Presidency, followed by the election of Cuenco as the new Senate President.

As a result, Avelino went to the Supreme Court, filing a quo warranto petition to reinstate himself as the Senate President and void Cuenco's election.

== Decision ==
Justices Felicisimo Feria and Guillermo Pablo wrote separate concurring opinions, while Justices Manuel Briones and Pedro Tuason published their dissenting opinions. Chief Justice Manuel Moran wrote a concurring and dissenting opinion, while Justice Gregorio Perfecto wrote separate dissenting and concurring opinions.

Justices Pablo and Perfecto wrote their opinions in Spanish.

=== On question if court has jurisdiction ===
The Court voted 6–4 to deny Avelino's motion.

The Court ruled that due to the political nature of the controversy, the judiciary should not interfere with the Senate's constitutional right to elect its own presiding officer, therefore the Court has grounds to deny the petition.

=== On question if resolutions were valid ===
Justices Montemayor and Reyes deemed that since the court has no jurisdiction, any further discussion is useless. Four justices concurred that there was a quorum (making the resolutions valid), while four other justices dissented, and another justice was not able to vote due to absence in the country.

As to the question of whether there was a quorum, it considered the fact that because of Senator Confesor's absence, the determination of the quorum should be computed based on 23 senators instead of 24:

There is a difference between a majority of "all the members of the House" and a majority of "the House", the latter requiring less number than the first. Therefore an absolute majority (12) of all the members of the Senate less one (23), constitutes constitutional majority of the Senate for the purpose of a quorum. Mr. Justice Pablo believes furthermore that even if the twelve did not constitute a quorum, they could have ordered the arrest of one, at least, of the absent members; if one had been so arrested, there would be no doubt Quorum then, and Senator Cuenco would have been elected just the same inasmuch as there would be eleven for Cuenco, one against and one abstained.

The four justices remarked that the any decisions made during the rump session be confirmed in a subsequent session with 13 or more members present, saying that naming Avelino as Senate president despite having just 11 supporting him, while Cuenco has 12, to be "most injudicious".

=== Should the petition be granted? ===
Six justices voted to dismiss the petition.

=== Motion for reconsideration ===
Claro M. Recto denounced the Supreme Court, saying, "For the Supreme Court to hide behind the cloak of separation of powers is a senile excuse that has been overabused by those who refuse to take responsibility on their shoulders." On the appeal, the court resolved "in the light of subsequent events" that it now had jurisdiction. The court ruled 7–1, with the same two justices reserving their vote, declared that there was indeed a quorum, and that the two resolutions were validly approved.

== Legacy ==
The ruling has been applied or cited on at least three occasions.

=== 2002 ===
On June 3, 2002, Senate President Franklin Drilon adjourned the second regular session sine die. From June 3 to 6, 2002, contested session was held by a bloc led by Senator Edgardo Angara. They convened with 12 members present declared a quorum citing Avelino v. Cuenco due to Senator Ramon Revilla being outside the Philippines and recuperating from a spine operation in the United States. The group gained leadership of the key committees and removed Manny Villar as president pro tempore and Loren Legarda as majority leader. The crisis ended on July 30, 2002 with concessions made.

=== 2015 ===
On May 5, 2015, the Senate convened with only 12 members present, after Senate President Franklin Drilon declared the presence of a quorum. Besides Drilon, in attendance were Senators Bam Aquino, Pia Cayetano, JV Ejercito, Francis Escudero, Gregorio Honasan, Lito Lapid, Bongbong Marcos, Koko Pimentel, Serge Osmeña, Tito Sotto and Cynthia Villar.

Senators Alan Peter Cayetano, TG Guingona and Loren Legarda were on official business; Senators Sonny Angara, Nancy Binay, Grace Poe and Ralph Recto were on official mission abroad, and Senator Miriam Defensor Santiago was on medical leave. As they were under detention due to the investigations on the Pork barrel scam, Senators Juan Ponce Enrile, Jinggoy Estrada and Bong Revilla were unable to attend.

Senator Antonio Trillanes arrived after the roll call, bringing up the quorum to 13.

In an interview in 2026, Drilon confirmed that he used Avelino v. Cuenco as the basis for convening the May 5, 2015 session.

=== 2026 ===
After the attempted arrest of Senator Ronald dela Rosa in May 2026 and the surrender of Senator Jinggoy Estrada on June 1, 2026, the Senate was left with only 22 members. The rest of the majority bloc did not report for work at the Senate, leaving only the eleven minority senators in the session hall. As a result, no session was convened.

The next day, only the minority senators went to the Senate and, for the second time, the senators from the majority bloc failed to show up. No session was held for lack of quorum.

The Senate impasse was broken when, on June 3, 2026, Senator Francis Escudero joined the members of the minority bloc who were present; with 12 senators present, a quorum was declared and the session resumed. Senator Sherwin Gatchalian was elected Senate president pro tempore, while Senator Juan Miguel Zubiri was elected as chair of the Committee on Rules thus becoming Majority Floor Leader, Renato Bantug Jr. as Senate Secretary, and Alfredo Sotto Corpuz as Senate sergeant-at-arms. The committee chairs were also declared vacant, after which the new chairs were elected.

In his remarks just before the session was adjourned sine die, Gatchalian cited Avelino v. Cuenco as their basis for declaring a quorum.

==== Reactions ====
Senator Alan Peter Cayetano criticized his colleagues, and insisted that he is still the legitimate Senate President.

The reorganization of the Senate leadership and the election of Gatchalian as Acting Senate President received recognition from both Malacañang and the House of Representatives. Palace Press Officer Claire Castro stated that the proceedings were conducted in accordance with the law and the rule of law, adding that the Palace recognized and respected the decision of the new Senate majority and the leadership of Gatchalian.

House Speaker Bojie Dy likewise congratulated Gatchalian on his election.

The Integrated Bar of the Philippines, citing Avelino v. Cuenco, published a statement where they said that "the Senate session of June 3, 2026 was lawful and valid following the Avelino doctrine because a quorum of 12 Senators was constituted."
