= Quorum =

Minimum number of members of a deliberative assembly necessary to conduct business

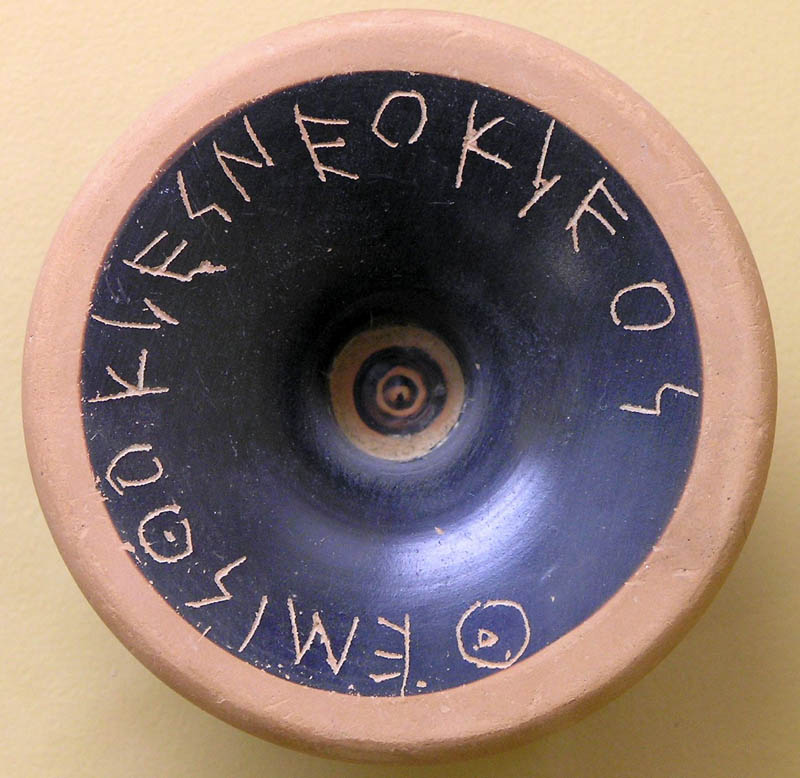
Vote cast against Themistocles. A quorum of 6,000 was required for ostracism under the Athenian democracy, according to Plutarch; a similar quorum was necessary in the following century for grants of citizenship.

A quorum is the minimum number of members of a group necessary to constitute the group at a meeting. In a deliberative assembly (a body that uses parliamentary procedure, such as a legislature), a quorum is necessary to conduct the business of that group. In contrast, a plenum is a meeting of the full (or rarely nearly full) body. A body, or a meeting or vote of it, is quorate if a quorum is present (or casts valid votes).

The term quorum is from a Middle English wording of the commission formerly issued to justices of the peace, derived from Latin quorum, "of whom", genitive plural of qui, "who". As a result, quora as plural of quorum is not a grammatically well-formed Latin-language construction. In modern times, a quorum might be defined as the minimum number of voters needed for a valid election. Quorums are often part of parliamentary procedure.

== In Robert's Rules of Order ==
According to Robert, each assembly determines the number of members that constitutes a quorum in its governing documents (such as in its constitution, charter, bylaws or standing orders). The quorum may also be set by law. Robert's Rules of Order Newly Revised states that the quorum set in an organization's bylaws "should approximate the largest number that can be depended on to attend any meeting except in very bad weather or other extremely unfavorable conditions."

In the absence of such a provision, a quorum is an assembly whose membership can be determined is a majority of the entire membership. In the meetings of a convention, unless provided otherwise, a quorum is a majority of registered delegates, even if some have departed. In a mass meeting or in an organization in which the membership cannot be accurately determined, the quorum consists of those who attend the meeting.

In committees and boards, a quorum is a majority of the members of the board or committee unless provided otherwise. The board or committee cannot set its own quorum unless given such power. In a committee of the whole or its variants, a quorum is the same as the assembly unless otherwise provided.

In online groups, a quorum has to be determined in a different manner since no one is actually "present". The rules establishing such groups would have to prescribe this determination. An example is that a quorum in such groups could be established as "present" if enough members state that they are "present" at the designated meeting time.

=== Determination of a quorum ===
The chairperson of the group has the responsibility to determine if a quorum is present. In addition, any member can raise a point of order about an apparent absence of a quorum. Because it is difficult to determine exactly when a quorum was lost, points of order relating to the absence of a quorum are "generally not permitted to affect prior action; but upon clear and convincing proof, such a point of order can be given effect retrospectively by a ruling of the presiding officer, subject to appeal."

=== Limited actions in the absence of a quorum ===
When a quorum is not met, the assembly can take only limited procedural actions. These limited actions are to fix the time to which to adjourn, adjourn, recess, or take measures to obtain a quorum, such as a motion that absent members be contacted during a recess.

Any other business that is conducted is not valid unless it is ratified at a later meeting where a quorum is present. However, there is no obligation to ratify such action and those responsible may be punished for their actions.

=== Call of the house ===
In legislatures and other assemblies that have the legal power to compel the attendance of their members, the call of the house procedure may be used to obtain a quorum. This procedure does not exist in ordinary societies, since voluntary associations have no coercive power.

When a call of the house is ordered, the clerk calls the roll of members and then the names of absentees. Members who do not have an excused absence are arrested and brought in. The arrested members may be charged a fee.

Both chambers of the United States Congress have the power to compel the attendance of absent members; this procedure, authorized by Article I, Section 5 of the U.S. Constitution is rarely used in the modern Congress.

== No-show paradox ==
Quorums have been criticized by social choice theorists for their pathological behavior, including an absurd result called a no-show paradox, where a proposal may pass because too many members oppose it. This has led many jurisdictions and bodies to replace traditional quorums with quorums of votes in favor, i.e. a requirement that any proposal be supported by a certain share of the entire membership to pass (e.g. 25% of all members).

== By country ==
=== Australia ===
While Section 22 and section 39 of the Constitution of Australia set the quorum for sittings of the House of Representatives and Senate at one-third of the whole number of MPs and senators, respectively, Parliament is permitted to change the quorum for each House by ordinary legislation.

In the House of Representatives, the quorum was amended down to one-fifth by the House of Representatives (Quorum) Act 1989, which means the quorum of the current House of 151 MPs is 31 MPs. In the senate, the quorum was amended down to one-quarter by the Senate (Quorum) Act 1991, so 19 senators is a quorum. The quorum includes the occupant of the Chair, and is not reduced by the death or resignation of a member or senator.

If at the beginning of a sitting the quorum is not met, the bells are rung for five minutes and a count is then taken; if the quorum is still not met the sitting is adjourned until the next sitting day. During the sitting, any MP or senator may draw attention to the lack of quorum in which the bells are rung for four minutes, and if a quorum is still not met the sitting is adjourned.

Although quorum-busting is virtually unheard of in Australia, it is not unknown for parties to deliberately use quorum counts as a disruptive tactic and there have been some suggestions to enact rules to restrict this practice; however, this is very difficult due to the explicit mention of a quorum in the constitution. It is considered disorderly to call attention to quorum when one exists, and members or senators who do so can be punished.

==== State and territorial quorums ====
State/Territory	Legislative Council	Legislative Assembly / House of Assembly
New South Wales	9 (of 42)	21 (of 93)
Victoria	One-third (14 of 40)	21 (of 88)
Queensland	N/A (Note: Queensland abolished their Legislative Council in 1922. At the time of establishment in 1867, one-third + President was quorum.)	17 (of 93)
Western Australia	one-third + President (13 of 36)	one-third + Speaker (21 of 59)
South Australia	10 (of 22)	17 (of 47)
Tasmania	7 (of 15)	14 (of 25)
Australian Capital Territory	N/A (Note: The Australian Capital Territory and the Northern Territory have never had a legislative council.)	majority (13 of 25)
Northern Territory	N/A	10 (of 25)

=== Austria ===
In the National Council of Austria at least one-third of the representatives must be present, so that they may decide on a simple law (participation quorum of 33.3%). At least half of the members must participate if a constitutional law should pass the parliament (participation quorum of 50% based on the total number of members). Over and above that, constitutional laws require the consent of at least two-thirds of the members present (quorum agreement of 66.6% based on the number of voting present).

=== Canada ===
In Canada, the Constitution Act, 1867 sets quorum for sittings of the House of Commons of Canada at 20 MPs. If a member calls for quorum to be counted and a first count shows there are fewer than 20 members, bells are rung to call in the members; if after 15 minutes there are still fewer than 20 members, the session is adjourned to the next sitting day; the members present sign a roll on the table of the house, and this list is included in the Journal of the House. There is no need for quorum when the attendance of the House is requested in the Senate of Canada, for example, when royal assent is being given to bills. The quorum of the Senate is 15.

==== Provincial and territorial quorums ====
Province/Territory	Quorum
Alberta	10
British Columbia	10
Manitoba	10
New Brunswick	14
Newfoundland and Labrador	15
Northwest Territories	majority
Nova Scotia	15
Nunavut	majority
Ontario	12
Prince Edward Island	10
Quebec	21
Saskatchewan	15
Yukon	majority

=== Germany ===
In the German Bundestag more than half of the members (currently 369 out of 736) must be present so that it is empowered to make resolutions. It is however common that fewer members are present, because they can still make effective decisions as long as no parliamentary group or 5% of the members of the parliament are complaining about the lack of quorum. This, in rare cases, is used by opposition parties to delay votes.

=== Hong Kong ===
Article 75 of the Basic Law of Hong Kong stipulates that the quorum required for the meetings of the Legislative Council of Hong Kong (LegCo) as "not less than one-half of its members". Between 1997 and 2012 the quorum was 30, and since 2012 it has been 35. Prior to 1997 transfer of sovereignty over Hong Kong, the quorum was set at 20.

The quorum for the panels, committees and subcommittees is, nevertheless, one-third or three members, whichever the greater, as according to the Rules of Procedure. The three standing committees, namely, the Finance Committee, the Public Accounts Committee and Committee on Members' Interests, is exceptional that the quorums are 9, 3 and 3 respectively.

=== India ===
Article 100 of the Constitution of India stipulates that at least 10% of total number of members of the House must be present to constitute the quorum to constitute a meeting of either House of Parliament. For example, if the House has the total membership of 250, at least 25 members must be present for the House to proceedings with its business.

If at any time during a meeting of a House there is no quorum, the chairman has to either adjourn the House or suspend it until there is a quorum.

=== Indonesia ===
Law No. 17 of 2014 on People's Consultative Assembly, House of Representatives, Regional Representative Council, and Regional House of Representatives (UU MD3) stipulated that any meeting or session of the House of Representatives (DPR) may reach a decision provided that a quorum is met. A quorum is achieved when a meeting is attended by more than half of the total number of members and includes representatives from more than half of the political factions—except in the case of meetings held to decide on the exercise of the right to express an opinion. If a quorum is not met, the meeting shall be adjourned up to two times, with each adjournment lasting no longer than 24 hours. If, after two such adjournments, a quorum is still not met, the matter of how to proceed shall be left to the leadership of the DPR.

For any constitutional amendments, Article 37 of the Constitution of Indonesia stipulates that 2/3 of the members of the People's Consultative Assembly must be present and according to verse 3 and 4 of Article 37, the decision shall be made with the approval of at least fifty percent plus one of the total number of MPR members. Regarding to the decision of impeachment, the decision by the People's Consultative Assembly (MPR) regarding a proposal for the removal of the President and/or Vice President must be made in a plenary session attended by at least 3/4 of the total number of members and approved by at least 2/3 of the members present according to Article 7B verse 7.

=== Ireland ===
According to the most recent standing orders, published in 2011, the quorum for the Oireachtas, the Irish parliament, for both the lower House, Dáil Éireann, and the upper House, Seanad Éireann, is 20 members.

The chamber of Dáil Éireann is rarely full outside question time, with often just one government representative (often an ordinary Teachta Dála, not a minister) present to answer opposition questions.

=== Italy ===
Article 64 of the Italian Constitution prescribes that the quorum for both houses of Parliament is an absolute majority of their membership. A quorum is assumed to be present unless 20 members in the Chamber of Deputies or 7 members in the Senate, respectively, request for its presence to be verified.

=== New Zealand ===
In the New Zealand Parliament there is no general quorum for the House to conduct business. The House's previous requirement for a quorum (15 members in a House of 99 members) was abolished in 1996. Some procedures do require minimum participation: a motion without notice to suspend the Standing Orders can be moved only if at least 60 members are present, and a personal vote requires at least 20 participating members.

=== Pakistan ===
Article 55 of the constitution of Pakistan, states that, if at any time during a sitting of the National Assembly the attention of the person presiding is drawn to the fact that less than one-fourth of the total membership of the Assembly is present, he shall either adjourn the Assembly or suspend the meeting until at least one-fourth of such membership is present, which currently comprises 84 out of total 336.

=== Philippines ===
In Congress of the Philippines, majority of the membership (13 in the Senate and 160 in the House of Representatives) is needed to muster a quorum. If someone contests the lack of quorum, a roll call shall be done, and if there is indeed less than a majority of members present, the meeting shall be adjourned.

Both majority and minority blocs in Congress have used the lack of quorum in defeating bills that they do not want to be passed without putting it to a vote. After an election during the lame-duck session, quorums are notoriously difficult to muster, more so in the House of Representatives as winning incumbents may opt to go on vacation, and defeated incumbents may opt not to show up.

Avelino v. Cuenco, a 1949 Supreme Court ruling, has been used to muster a quorum in the Senate with less than 13 members. The ruling introduced the concept of discounting senators who are outside the upper chamber's "coercive jurisdiction". This has been interpreted as members who are outside the Philippines such as cited in the 1949 case, or members who are detained for criminal charges as a 2015 precedent argues.

=== Turkey ===
According to article 96 of the Turkish Constitution, unless otherwise stipulated in the Constitution, the Turkish Grand National Assembly shall convene with at least, one-third of the total number of members (184 out of 550) and shall take decisions by an absolute majority of those present; however, the quorum for decisions can, under no circumstances, be less than a quarter plus one of the total number of members (138 out of 550).

Before the constitutional referendum of 2007, there was a quorum of two-thirds required in the Turkish Parliament: after opposition parties used the quorum to deadlock the presidential election of 2007, making it impossible for the parliament to choose a president, the ruling AK party proposed a referendum to lower the quorum to prevent a repeat of this event. Nearly seventy percent of the participants supported the constitutional changes.

=== United Kingdom ===
In the Parliament of the United Kingdom, the House of Commons has a quorum of 40 MPs, including the Speaker, out of 650 members of the House. There is no need for a quorum to be present at all times: Commons debates could theoretically continue even if only one MP and the Speaker were present.

However, if a division is called and fewer than 40 MPs are present, then a decision on the business being considered is postponed and the House moves on to consider the next item of business.

The quorum for votes on legislation in the House of Lords is 30, but just three of the 753 peers, including the Lord Speaker, are required to be present for a debate to take place.

Historically, the quorum was a select group of the justices of the peace in each county in early modern Britain. In theory, they were men experienced in law, but many of the quorum were appointed because of their status. Some legislation required the involvement of a member of the quorum (e.g., granting a license to a badger). In practice, they increasingly were not qualified, as the proportion in the quorum rose faster than the proportion who were called to the bar or practising lawyers. By 1532, an average 45% of justices of the peace nationally were of the quorum. In Somerset, the proportion rose from 52% in 1562 to 93% in 1636. By then, most of those not on the quorum were new to the bench. Sometimes justices of the peace were removed from the quorum as a disciplinary measure less drastic than removal from the bench.

=== United Nations ===
The large deliberative bodies of the United Nations (the General Assembly and Economic and Social Council, as well as their subsidiary organs) generally require the attendance of one-third of the membership (currently 65 states in the General Assembly and 18 in ECOSOC) to conduct most business, but a majority of members (currently 97 states in the General Assembly and 28 states in ECOSOC) in order to take any substantive decisions. The rules of the United Nations Security Council make no provisions for quorum, but nine votes are in all cases required to pass any measure, effectively meaning that a meeting with fewer than nine members in attendance is pointless.

=== United States ===
Article I, Section 5, Clause 1 of the United States Constitution provides that "Each House shall be the Judge of the Elections, Returns and Qualifications of its own Members, and a Majority of each shall constitute a Quorum to do Business..."

Therefore, in both the House of Representatives and the Senate, a quorum is a simple majority of their respective members (currently 218 in the House and 51 in the Senate).

The only exceptions are those stated in the Twelfth Amendment:

- In cases where no candidate for President of the United States receives a majority in the Electoral College, the election is decided by the House of Representatives, in which case "a quorum for this purpose shall consist of a member or members from two-thirds of the states" (a possible quorum as low as 34).
- In cases in which no candidate for Vice President of the United States receives a majority in the Electoral College, the election is decided by the Senate, in which case "a quorum for the purpose shall consist of two-thirds of the whole number of Senators" (a quorum of 67).

The Senate has the additional ordinary requirement in Rule VI of its Standing Rules that "A quorum shall consist of a majority of the Senators duly chosen and sworn."

==== Call of the house in the United States Senate ====
In the United States Senate, the procedure was last used in the early morning hours of 25 February 1988.

Senator Robert C. Byrd of West Virginia, then the Senate Majority Leader, moved a call of the house after the minority Republicans walked out of the chamber in an attempt to deny the Senate a quorum after Senate aides began bringing cots into the Senate cloakrooms in preparation for an all-night session over campaign finance reform for congressional elections.

Byrd's motion was approved 45-3 and arrest warrants were signed for all 46 Republicans: Senate Sergeant-at-Arms Henry K. Giugni and his staff searched the Capitol's corridor and Senate office buildings for absent Senators, and after checking several empty offices, spotted Senator Steve Symms of Idaho, who fled down a hallway and escaped arrest. After a cleaning woman gave a tip that Senator Robert Packwood of Oregon was in his office, Giugni opened the door with a skeleton key. Packwood attempted to shove the door closed, but Giugni and two assistants pushed it open. Packwood was subsequently carried feet-first into the Senate chamber by three plainclothes officers and sustained bruised knuckles.

Prior to 1988, the last time the procedure had been used was during a 1942 filibuster over civil rights legislation: Southern Democrat senators had spent days filibustering legislation to end poll taxes, days after the midterm elections had resulted in the Democrats losing of nine seats. Democratic Majority Leader Alben W. Barkley obtained an order on a Saturday session on 14 November 1942, directing Sergeant at Arms Chesley W. Jurney to detain the five Southern absentees to obtain a quorum. Jurney sent his Deputy Sergeant at Arms, J. Mark Trice, to the apartment of Democratic Senator Kenneth McKellar of Tennessee at the Mayflower Hotel. Then 73 years old and the third-most senior Senator, McKellar was later described by Republican Senator Bill Frist in his book on Tennessee senators as an "extraordinarily shrewd man of husky dimensions with a long memory and a short fuse." Trice called from the lobby, but McKellar refused to answer his phone, so the deputy sergeant-at-arms walked up to the apartment and convinced the senator's maid to let him in:

When Trice explained that McKellar was urgently needed back at the Capitol, the 73-year-old legislator agreed to accompany him. As they approached the Senate wing, McKellar suddenly realized what was up. An aide later recalled, "His face grew redder and redder. By the time the car reached the Senate entrance, McKellar shot out and barreled through the corridors to find the source of his summons."
Barkley got his quorum...

=== Summary per legislature ===
Country	Lower (or sole) house	Upper house	Notes
Australia	One-fifth of all members	One-fourth of all members	
Austria	One-third of all members		
Canada	20 members	15 members	
Germany	Majority of all members		
Hong Kong	Majority of all members		
India	One-tenth of all members	One-tenth of all members	
Indonesia	Majority of all members	Majority for all members	A minimum of half of all parliamentary fractions attending
Ireland	20 members	20 members	
Italy	Majority of all members	Majority of all members	
New Zealand	None		
Pakistan	One-fourth of all members		
Philippines	Majority of all members	Majority of all members	Only includes members under "coercive jurisdiction" of a chamber
Turkey	One-third of all members		
United Kingdom	40 members	30 members	
United States	Majority of all members	Majority of all members	Twelfth amendment provision is "two-thirds of states" for either chamber

== Quorum-busting ==
Quorum-busting, also known as a walkout, is a tactic that prevents a legislative body from attaining a quorum, and can be used by a minority group seeking to block the adoption of some measure they oppose. This generally only happens where the quorum is a super-majority, as quorums of a majority or less of the membership mean that the support of a majority of members is always sufficient for the quorum (as well as for passage). Rules to discourage quorum-busting have been adopted by legislative bodies, such as the call of the house, outlined above.

Quorum-busting has been used for centuries. For instance, in 1840 during his time in the Illinois Legislature, Abraham Lincoln leapt out of a first story window (the doors of the Capitol had been locked to prevent legislators from fleeing) in a failed attempt to prevent a quorum from being present.

=== Recent prominent examples ===
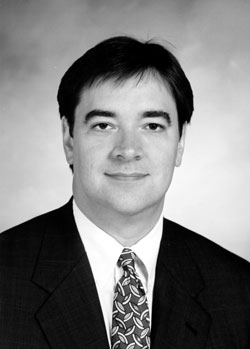
Jim Dunnam led the "Killer Ds" walkout, a prominent example of quorum-busting.

==== Texas (2003, 2021, 2025) ====
The Texas Constitution requires a 2/3 majority in each chamber of the Texas Legislature for a quorum to be present (unlike the United States Congress, and most state legislatures which only requires a simple majority). As such, on several occasions, the minority party has engaged in a walkout so as to prevent a quorum.

During the 2003 Texas redistricting, the majority Republicans in the Texas House of Representatives sought to carry out a controversial mid-decade congressional redistricting bill which would have favored Republicans by displacing five Democratic U.S. Representatives from Texas, nicknamed the "Texas Five", from their districts. The House Democrats, certain of defeat if a quorum were present, took a plane to the neighboring state of Oklahoma to prevent a quorum from being present (and thus the passage of the bill). The group gained the nickname the "Killer Ds".

Similarly, the minority Democrats in the Texas Legislature's upper chamber, the Texas Senate, fled to New Mexico to prevent a quorum of the Senate to prevent a redistricting bill from being considered during a special session. The group, nicknamed the "Texas Eleven", stayed in New Mexico for 46 days before John Whitmire returned to Texas, creating a quorum. Because there was now no point in staying in New Mexico, the remaining ten members of the Texas Eleven returned to Texas to vote in opposition to the bill.

On May 30, 2021 Democratic House Representatives in Texas left the chamber during debate on a controversial bill relating to voting rules. Their absence caused the bill to fail due to a midnight deadline for passing legislation. After the Governor called a special session that included the same legislation, Democratic members fled the state on the 12th of July 2021 to block the passage of a bill. At least 51 Democrats – the number needed to break quorum – left the state to Washington D.C. via plane in order to lobby federal lawmakers to take up opposing legislation. On 10 August 2021 the Texas House Speaker Dade Phelan authorized arrest warrants for the legislators breaking quorum. After 38 days quorum was regained when three Democrats, Garnet Coleman, Armando Walle and Ana Hernandez returned, though with Coleman providing quorum from home due to serious illness and Republican Steve Allison isolating in a side room of the chamber due to contracting COVID-19.

After the 2021 quorum breaks, the House adopted rule changes in order to place fines on members who break quorum.

Texas Democratic members of the State House of Representatives launched another walkout on August 4, 2025, due to mid-decade redistricting. Texas House Speaker Dustin Burrows issued civil warrants to try and secure their return. The break ended on August 18, after a new special session was called and other states pledged to also participate in the redistricting effort in order to offset any partisan gains. Once the members returned, the House of Representatives changed the rules to increase the penalties incurred in order to discourage future quorum busting attempts.

==== Wisconsin (2011) ====
During the 2011 Wisconsin protests, fourteen Democratic members of the Wisconsin Senate went to Illinois in order to break the necessary 20-member quorum. This was done in order to prevent a vote on right-to-work legislation. The legislature issued warrants to attempt to secure the members' arrests, but traveling out of the state placed these legislators beyond the jurisdiction of state troopers who could compel them to return to the chamber. After a month, the Republican leadership of the Senate stripped certain portions from the bill that lowered the quorum threshold required to pass the bill. The absent members returned a few days after the amended bill passed.

==== Indiana (2011) ====
Inspired by the quorum bust in Wisconsin, 37 Democrats in the Indiana House of Representatives followed suit in order to block their own proposed union-related legislation. These members also left the state to Illinois in order to prevent being returned against their will. After about six weeks of negotiations, the members returned after a deal was reached with Speaker of the House Brian Bosma which removed some of the contentious bills from the legislative calendar.

==== Oregon (2001, 2019–2023) ====
In 2001, Democratic members of the House of Representatives staged a five-day walkout over redistricting. Then-Representative Mark Hass participated in the walkout and later noted that although the tactic worked, Democrats "got beaten up pretty hard."

Beginning in May 2019, Republican state senators in Oregon made a series of walkouts in opposition to an emissions trading bill. On 20 June 2019, Gov. Kate Brown authorized the Oregon State Police to bring back the senators, who had left the Oregon State Capitol to bust the needed quorum. State Sen. Brian Boquist said that he told the state police superintendent to "send bachelors and come heavily armed. I'm not going to be a political prisoner in the state of Oregon. It's just that simple."

In 2022, Oregon voters approved Measure 113 which disqualified members who were absent unexcused for more than 10 legislative days from running for reelection. During the 2023 legislative session, there was another walkout by the Republican state senators which led to the disqualification of 10 members. Their disqualification was later upheld by the State Supreme Court in 2024.

==== Germany (2012) ====
On June 15, 2012, opposition members of the Bundestag boycotted a procedural vote to delay the first reading of a controversial childcare subsidy. When the vote was completed, the roll showed that only 211 members were present in the chamber, 100 short of the quorum threshold. Due to the lack of quorum, Bundestag Vice President Petra Pau ended the legislative session about 3 hours earlier than expected. Members of the government criticized the event as an "affront" and "unprecedented". They condemned the opposition members who participated for engaging in "dirty tricks" to delay the vote.

==== Hong Kong (2005, 2010, 2012, 2015) ====
In 2005, when some pro-democracy members of the council paid a silent tribute to late leader of the People's Republic of China, Zhao Ziyang, against the Rules of Procedure, the president of the council suspended the meeting. When the meeting was recalled, pro-Beijing members refused to return to the chamber, forcing the meeting to be adjourned.

On 27 January 2010, when five pro-democracy members were intending to make their resignation speeches, pro-Beijing members of the council left the chamber as a sign of protest. One of the pro-Beijing members nevertheless stayed in the chamber to call for the quorum to be counted, effectively forcing the meeting to be adjourned. The resignation was intended as a de facto referendum across all five geographical constituencies of the territory, involving the entire electorate, which would not be officially recognised anyway. Most other factions, although against the move by these five Members, stayed in the chamber.

On 2 May 2012, when the LegCo was debating a law change to bar resigning legislators to participate in by-elections in 6 months, effectively discouraging any more "de facto" referendums, some of the five pro-democracy members who resigned constantly issued quorum calls, especially when they were making their resignation speeches intended for 2 years before. In the nine-hour meeting, 23 quorum calls were issued, taking up to 3 hours. When LegCo reconvened on 3 May, it was adjourned for lack of quorum amid a boycott by the pan-democrats. The pro-government members drew a timetable to ensure a quorum, but it failed to prevent another lack of quorum.

On 18 June 2015, when the LegCo was due to vote on a resolution to amend the provisions for the election of the territory's Chief Executive, pro-Beijing members left the chamber to force a quorum roll call to make sure that a sick member could be able to rush back to the chamber. However some of the members stayed behind, citing miscommunication, and the division proceeded with two members above the required quorum of 35. While the resolution was originally predicted to be narrowly defeated due to not able to get super-majority support votes, it turned out to be a landslide defeat.

Quorum-busting and attempts to thwart it are also a common feature during the annual motion debate related to the 1989 Tiananmen massacre moved by pro-democracy Members. The quorum is called to be counted from time to time by the pan-democrats, in order to force the pro-Beijing camp to keep some members in the chamber.

==== Pakistan (2024) ====
On August 27, 2024, independent member Vehari Aurangzeb Khichi raised a point of order to a lack of quorum within the chamber. The Deputy Speaker Ghulam Mustafa Shah ordered a roll call and confirmed the lack of quorum. Shah adjourned the assembly for three days. This adjournment delayed the introduction of multiple bills affecting the judiciary, including a constitutional amendment relating to the suo motu powers of the Pakistan Supreme Court.

==== Philippines (2010 and 2026) ====
On February 2, 2010, Antonio Cerilles called for a roll call after a debate with Mariano Piamonte Jr. over the length of a floor speech. The subsequent roll call showed only 95 of the 134 needed members present. This caused the House of Representatives to adjourn which subsequently delayed the swearing in of members-elect Celestino Martinez III and Domingo Espina.

On, May 26, 2026, the 24-seat Senate was split into a 13-member majority and 11-member minority. The majority bloc moved on to approve Senator Rodante Marcoleta's 15-day old proposal to amend the legislature rules to enable members of to attend remotely under "justifiable reasons". The minority bloc accused the other side of railroading the amendments. The eleven-member group staged a walk-out. Quorum was broken since it requires 13 out of 24 members of the Senate to be present. The majority bloc was left with 12 members physically present due to the absence of Senator Bato dela Rosa. The amendment was for dela Rosa who is evading arrest on an arrest warrant from the International Criminal Court.

=== Disappearing quorum ===
A tactic similar to quorum busting, is that of a disappearing quorum. In this situation, members of the legislative body refuse to vote or register although they are physically present on the floor of the chamber. The method was a popular strategy used by the minority party in the United States House of Representatives to block votes from 1842 (when a speaking time limit was introduced) until 1890. It was seen as the lower chamber's analogous companion to the filibuster in the United States Senate. The practice was made obsolete on January 29, 1890, in what has popularly been called the "Battle of the Reed Rules," when Speaker Thomas Brackett Reed ordered that members who were present on the floor would count for the purpose of a quorum, even if they did not reply to the roll call. The changes were permanently adopted into the House Rules in 1894. Many other legislative bodies have adopted similar rules to empower the Speaker of the chamber to show a member as present even if they refuse to answer the roll call.

== See also ==
- Abstentionism – political practice by which duly elected members of a legislature refuse to take up the seats won in an election
- Minyan – the quorum of 10 Jews (traditionally, male adults, above the age of 13) necessary for Jewish communal prayer to be conducted
- Quorum call
