= Section 22 of the Constitution of Australia =

Section 22 of the Constitution of Australia provides that the quorum of the Australian Senate shall be one third of the total number of Senators, until the Parliament otherwise provides.

With the passage of the Senate (Quorum) Act 1991, the Parliament has changed the quorum to one quarter of the total number of Senators, which with the current Senate size of 76 means that at least 19 Senators are required for a quorum.

== See also ==
- Section 39 of the Constitution of Australia
