= Diogo Fernandes (Brazilian footballer) =

Brazilian footballer (born 1985)

Personal information
- Full name: Diogo Fernandes
- Date of birth: 15 December 1985 (age 40)
- Place of birth: Barueri, Brazil
- Height: 1.75 m (5 ft 9 in)
- Positions: Midfielder; full-back

Team information
- Current team: Bryne
- Number: 7

Senior career*
Years	Team	Apps	(Gls)
2005–2006	Social Sol		
2006	Motagua	9	(0)
2007	Victoria	13	(2)
2008	Bacabal	0	(0)
2008–2009	Boavista F.C.	23	(2)
2009	Ituiutaba	0	(0)
2010	Red Bull Brasil	0	(0)
2012	Bryne	19	(2)
2016–	Grêmio Vitória Regia	?	(?)
- * Club domestic league appearances and goals as of 9 December 2012

Diogo Fernandes (born 15 December 1985) is a Brazilian footballer.

== Biography ==
Diogo Fernandes signed for Bacabal of Taça Cidade de São Luís in January 2008 (Campeonato Maranhense started in second half of calendar year, unlike other states). The team then qualified for Campeonato Brasileiro Série C 2008, but Diogo did not play in the national league.

In August 2008, he signed a 1-year contract with Portuguese Liga de Honra side Boavista F.C., wore number 77 shirt. Mainly a substitute, he scored 2 league goals for the Porto side.

After Boavista relegated, he joined Ituiutaba which the team recently exited the Campeonato Série C and was preparing for Taça Minas Gerais. He was released after the last group match of the Cup, as the team failed to qualified for the next round.

In December 2009, he signed a contract with Red Bull Brasil until the end of 2010 Campeonato Paulista Série A3.

== Honours ==
- Taça Cidade de São Luís: 2008
- Campeonato Paulista Série A3: 2010
