= Mariano Godoy =

Honduran footballer (born 1950)

Personal information
- Full name: Mariano de Jesús Godoy Cerrato
- Date of birth: 17 October 1950 (age 76)
- Place of birth: Tegucigalpa, Francisco Morazán, Honduras
- Position: Midfielder

Senior career*
Years	Team	Apps	(Gls)
1967–1968	Federal		
1968–1979	Motagua		(10)
1979–1981	Atlético Morazán		

International career
1971–1973	Honduras		
- * Club domestic league appearances and goals

Mariano de Jesús Godoy Cerrato (born 17 october 1950) is a retired Honduran footballer. He played for Federal, Motagua and Atlético Morazán throughout the 1970s and the early 1980s. He also represented Honduras for the 1971 and 1973 CONCACAF Championships.

== Club career ==
Godoy began his career with Federal throughout the 1967–68 Honduran Liga Nacional for a single season. He soon began playing for Motagua for the following season. He soon found himself part of the winning squad of the very first 1968 Honduran Cup with that same season also seeing the club winning the 1968–69 Honduran Liga Nacional. This success for Motagua would continue into the 1970s as Godoy was part of the winning squads for the 1970–71, the 1973–74 and 1978–79 Honduran Liga Nacional as he played alongside other players such as Ángel Obando and Luis Reyes. The following season saw him play for Atlético Morazán within the 1979 Honduran Segunda División as he also achieved the club being promoted to the top-flight of Honduran football before retiring two seasons later.

== International career ==
Godoy was first called up to participate in the 1971 CONCACAF Championship where Honduras would end last in the tournament. However, he was then part of the squad that led to Honduras qualifying for the following 1973 CONCACAF Championship.
