= Juan Colecchio =

Peruvian football manager (born 1942)

Personal information
- Full name: Juan Colecchio Maiano
- Place of birth: Argentina
- Date of death: April 1, 2002
- Place of death: Panama

Managerial career
- Years: Team
- 1967: Atlético Marte
- 1968: Motagua
- 1971–1972: Alajuelense
- 1986–1987: Panama

Juan Colecchio Maiano (died 1 April 2002) was an Argentine football manager.

== Early life ==
Colecchio was born in Argentina. He played as a goalkeeper.

== Career ==
In 1967, Colecchio was appointed manager of Salvadoran side Atlético Marte. In 1968, he was appointed manager of Honduran side Motagua. In 1971, he was appointed manager of Costa Rican side Alajuelense. He helped the club win the league. In 1986, he was appointed manager of the Panama national football team. He managed the team at the 1990 FIFA World Cup qualification.

== Personal life ==
Colecchio died on 1 April 2002 in Panama. After retiring from football management, he worked as a radio commentator.
