= 1993 Honduran Cup =

Tournament details
- Country: Honduras
- Teams: 10

Final positions
- Champions: Real Maya
- Runner-up: Motagua

Tournament statistics
- Matches played: 26

The 1993 Honduran Cup was the fourth Honduran football cup. This season Real Maya lift the trophy for the first time after beating Motagua in the final match.

== First round ==
=== Group A ===
==== Standings ====
Pos	Team	Pld	W	D	L	GF	GA	GD	Pts	Qualification
1	Victoria	0	0	0	0	0	0	0	0	Qualification to the Final round
2	Motagua	0	0	0	0	0	0	0	0	Qualification to the Final round
3	Marathón	0	0	0	0	0	0	0	0	
4	Petrotela	0	0	0	0	0	0	0	0	
5	Deportes Progreseño	0	0	0	0	0	0	0	0	

=== Group B ===
==== Standings ====
Pos	Team	Pld	W	D	L	GF	GA	GD	Pts	Qualification
1	Real España	4	3	1	0	13	3	+10	7	Qualification to the Final round
2	Real Maya	4	2	1	1	9	6	+3	5	Qualification to the Final round
3	Olimpia	4	1	2	1	11	3	+8	4	
4	Vida	4	0	4	0	4	6	−2	4	
5	Platense	4	0	1	3	2	22	−20	1	

== Final round ==
=== Semifinals ===
12 September 1993 1st leg	Real Maya	2–1	Victoria	Danlí, El Paraíso
				Stadium: Estadio Marcelo Tinoco

15 September 1993 2nd leg	Victoria	1–1	Real Maya	La Ceiba, Atlántida
				Stadium: Estadio Nilmo Edwards

- Real Maya won 3–2 on aggregate.

12 September 1993 1st leg	Motagua	2–0	Real España	Tegucigalpa, Francisco Morazán
				Stadium: Estadio Tiburcio Carías Andino

15 September 1993 2nd leg	Real España	1–1	Motagua	San Pedro Sula, Cortés
				Stadium: Estadio Francisco Morazán

- Motagua won 3–1 on aggregate.

=== Final ===
23 September 1993 1st leg	Motagua	0–2	Real Maya	Tegucigalpa, Francisco Morazán
			Zúniga	Stadium: Estadio Tiburcio Carías Andino

26 September 1993 2nd leg	Real Maya	3–3	Motagua	Danlí, El Paraíso
	Zúniga; Figueroa		Coello; Izquierdo	Stadium: Estadio Marcelo Tinoco

- Real Maya won 5–3 on aggregate.

== Known results ==
15 August 1993 Group B	Platense	2–2	Real España	Puerto Cortés, Cortés
			Pavón	Stadium: Estadio Excélsior

1 September 1993 Group B	Real España	2–0	Olimpia	San Pedro Sula, Cortés
	Pavón			Stadium: Estadio Francisco Morazán

4 September 1993 Group A	Marathón	2–0	Deportes Progreseño	San Pedro Sula, Cortés
	Reyes			Stadium: Estadio Francisco Morazán

8 September 1993 Group B	Real España	2–1	Vida	San Pedro Sula, Cortés
	Pavón			Stadium: Estadio Francisco Morazán
