= Diego Mejía =

Diego Mejía may refer to:

- Diego Mejía (footballer, born 1982), Salvadoran football forward
- Diego Mejía (footballer, born 1983), Mexican football manager and former midfielder
