= Section 39 of the Constitution of Australia =

Constitutional provision on the quorum of the Australian House of Representatives

Joseph Carruthers wanted the initial quorum to be twenty members, instead of one third of the members

Section 39 of the Constitution of Australia provides that the quorum of the Australian House of Representatives shall be one third of the total number of members, until the Parliament otherwise provides.

== Text ==
Until the Parliament otherwise provides, the presence of at least one-third of the whole number of the members of the House of Representatives shall be necessary to constitute a meeting of the House for the exercise of its powers, and for that purpose the whole number of the members shall be ascertained from time to time by the Speaker.

— Constitution of Australia, s 39

== History ==
During the Convention debates in Adelaide, Joseph Carruthers suggested that one third was too high and suggested that a quorum of twenty would be sufficient, but his suggestion was rejected.

With the passage of the House of Representatives (Quorum) Act 1989, the Parliament has changed the quorum to one fifth of the total number of members, which with the current House of Representatives size of 150 means that at least 30 members are required for a quorum.

== See also ==
- Section 22 of the Constitution of Australia
