= Elmer Montoya =

Honduran footballer (born 1977)

Personal information
- Full name: Elmer Roberto Montoya Meza
- Date of birth: 10 December 1977 (age 48)
- Place of birth: Honduras
- Position: Defender

Senior career*
Years	Team	Apps	(Gls)
1999–2006	Motagua		(58)
2007	Broncos UNAH		

International career
1996	Honduras U-20		
2000–2001	Honduras U-23		
- * Club domestic league appearances and goals

Elmer Roberto Montoya Meza (born 8 December 1977) is a retired Honduran football defender.

== Club career ==
He played most of his career for F.C. Motagua. He was one of the best players Motagua have ever had, his techniques were amazing but due to a medical problem he retired.

== International career ==
In 1996, Montoya played for the Honduras U-20s at the 1996 CONCACAF U-20 Tournament. Montoya made his debut for Honduras in a November 1999 friendly match against Guatemala and has earned a total of 38 caps, scoring 13 goals. He has represented his country in 4 FIFA World Cup qualification matches[6] and played at the 2000 Summer Olympics. He also played at the 2001,[7] 2003[8] and 2007 UNCAF Nations Cups[9] as well as at the 2000,[10] 2003s[11] Montoya also represented the Honduras national under-23 football team at the 2000 Olympics.
