= Henry Enamorado =

Honduran footballer (born 1977)

Personal information
- Full name: Henry Enamorado
- Date of birth: 5 August 1977 (age 49)
- Place of birth: Santa Bárbara, Honduras
- Height: 1.80 m (5 ft 11 in)
- Position: Goalkeeper

Senior career*
Years	Team	Apps	(Gls)
2000–2005	UNAH		
2005–2007	Platense		

International career^{‡}
2001–2006	Honduras	2	(0)
- * Club domestic league appearances and goals as of 2015 ‡ National team caps and goals as of Dec 11, 2014

Henry Enamorado (born 5 August 1977) is a Honduran former goalkeeper.

== International career ==
He was a member of the Honduras national football team in 2001 Copa América where Honduras finished in a historic 3rd Place.

In the third-place Match, Enamorado saved a penalty kick of the Uruguayan player Carlos Eduardo Gutiérrez.
