= Roberto Abrussezze =

Brazilian footballer and manager (born 1948)

Personal information
- Full name: Roberto Abrussezze
- Date of birth: 29 March 1948 (age 78)
- Place of birth: Rio de Janeiro, Brazil
- Position: Forward

Senior career*
Years	Team	Apps	(Gls)
- Castellón
1965	Botafogo		
- Flamengo
- Atlético Unión de Portugal
1968–1970	Motagua		(34)
- Cartaginés
1971–1972	FC Den Bosch	1	(0)
1973–1974	Linares		

Managerial career
- 1983–1986: El Nacional
- 1987: Emelec
- 1987: Operário
- Deportivo Municipal
- Tampico Madero
- Turrialba
- 1993: Motagua
- 1995: Cuenca
- –1999: Goicochea
- 1999: Limonense
- Saudi Arabia
- 2000: FAS
- 2008: Municipal Valencia
- 2009: ESPOLI
- * Club domestic league appearances and goals

Roberto Abrussezze (born 29 March 1948) is a Brazilian manager and former professional footballer who played as a forward.
