= Luis Ortiz =

Luis Ortiz may refer to:

== Sports ==
- Luis Ortiz de Urbina (1899–1959), Spanish footballer
- Luis Ortiz (sport shooter) (born 1951), Colombian sports shooter
- Luis Ortiz (Puerto Rican boxer) (born 1965), Puerto Rican boxer
- Luis Ortiz (Cuban boxer) (born 1979), Cuban boxer in 2005 Boxing World Cup
- Luis Ortiz (third baseman) (born 1970), Dominican baseball player
- Luis Ortiz (pitcher, born 1995), American baseball player
- Luis Ortiz (pitcher, born 1999), Dominican baseball player

== Other ==
- Luis "Perico" Ortiz (born 1949), Puerto Rican trumpet player and composer
- Luis D. Ortiz (born 1986), Puerto Rican realtor
- Luis Ortiz González (1932–2006), Spanish politician
- Luis Ortiz Lugo (born 1968), Puerto Rican politician
- Luis Ortiz Monasterio (1906–1990), Mexican sculptor
- Luis Ortiz Rosales (died 1937), Spanish artist
