= Luis Meléndez =

Luis Meléndez may refer to:

- Luis Egidio Meléndez, Spanish painter
- Luis Meléndez (athlete), Spanish Olympic athlete
- Luis Meléndez (baseball), Puerto Rican baseball player
