= F.C. Motagua =

Association football club in Honduras

Motagua
- Full name: Fútbol Club Motagua
- Nicknames: Ciclón Azul (Blue Cyclone); Aguilas (Eagles); Azul Profundo (Deep Blue); Los Mimados (The Loved Ones)
- Founded: 29 August 1928; 98 years ago
- Ground: Estadio Nacional Chelato Uclés
- Capacity: 35,000
- President: Eduardo Atala
- Coach: Javier López
- League: Liga Nacional
- 2026 Clausura: League table: 3rd Semifinal triangulars: Group A (winners); Finals: Champions
- Website: www.motagua.com
Home colours	Away colours	Third colours

Fútbol Club Motagua (Spanish pronunciation: [moˈtaɣwa]), formerly Club Deportivo Motagua up to 2017, is a Honduran professional football club based in Tegucigalpa, that competes in the Liga Nacional de Fútbol de Honduras, the top division of Honduran football.

Motagua was founded on 29 August 1928, and plays its home games at the Estadio Nacional Chelato Uclés. The club is one of the most successful and renowned in Honduras.

== History ==
The club was founded on 29 August 1928. Three previous clubs, América, Honduras Atlética and Águila, were in the process of falling apart. Marco Antonio Ponce and Marco Antonio Rosa called a meeting and proposed that the clubs unite to form a new club, Motagua (named for a nearby river). After the success of the meeting, a board of directors was appointed.

The first game was played on 25 November 1928, against Tejeros del España at La Isla. Constantine Gálvez "Tatino" was the captain and Daniel Bustillo was the manager. The team fought to a 1–1 draw.

The first international game was played on 9 April 1939 against Costa Rican side Orión at the San Felipe field in Tegucigalpa; Motagua were managed by Honduran coach Lurio Martínez and won the match 3–0 with three goals from "Gorgojo" Ramos.

=== Professional era ===
The team debuted professionally in the 1965–66 season. It took them only three years to win their first-ever championship. Under the leadership of manager Rodolfo Godoy, Motagua surged past two-time defending champions Olimpia to win the 1968–69 title, with 39 points to the Olimpia's 36. Godoy's club completed the double that season by winning the first-ever Honduran Cup.

This was the beginning of a long run at or near the top of the table for Motagua; they finished second behind Olimpia in 1969–70, then won the 1970–71 crown. That last season ended with Motagua and Olimpia level on points, with Motagua hoisting the crown on goal difference. They would likely have won a third championship in 1972–73, as they led the table halfway through the season. However, the season was cancelled at its midway point, and the records expunged.

The rest of the 1970s remained a good time for Motagua. They won titles in 1973–74 and 1978–79, while finishing second in 1974–75 and 1976–77. The club had become established as one of the nation's strongest, and when the Honduras national football team qualified to the World Cup Finals, they featured five Motagua players.

However, the 1980s were not as strong. Between 1979 and 1992, the club was locked out of the Honduran crown. It was not until the end of the 1991–92 season that the drought was over. They claimed that title by beating Real España 1–0 in the championship playoffs. With the drought broken, Motagua began winning titles regularly. They claimed the Honduran Cup in 1993 and 1995, then claimed an unexpected championship in the 1998 Apertura, beating Real España 5–2 on aggregate in the championship final. They repeated as champions that October, beating Olimpia 1–0.

They did it again in 1999–2000, beating Olimpia on penalties in both the Apertura and Clausura finals. They added another title in the 2002 Apertura, beating Marathón on penalties in a thrilling 5–3 shootout. After a drought of nearly five years, Motagua returned to the top with a title in the 2006 Apertura (over Olimpia) and 2011 Clausura (again over Olimpia).

In 2013, a new golden age began. Diego Vásquez, a veteran Honduran keeper who had played in two stints for Motagua, took over. In just his second full season, Vasquez steered Motagua to the 2014 Apertura crown, beating Real Sociedad 2–1 in the championship final (Rubilio Castillo's header was the winner). Three near misses followed, but in 2016–2017, Vasquez would lead the team to new heights.

It started with the 2016 Apertura. After taking 4th in the regular season, Motagua battled their way through the quarterfinals and semi-finals (beating Olimpia). Then they held off Platense 2–1 on aggregate to win the Apertura title.

In the Clausura, they finished 2nd in the regular season, then stormed to the title, crushing Honduras Progreso 7–1 on aggregate.

Vasquez, who remains Motagua's manager, is the longest tenured manager in the history of Honduras's top-flight; he has managed 200 consecutive matches with Las Aguilas.

Overall, between both amateur and professional seasons, Motagua has won 27 titles. They have won 16 professional titles. The club has participated in all Honduran top division seasons since its inception in 1965 and is one of the few unrelegated teams.

== The club ==
=== Colours and badges ===
Home: 1928–present	Home: 1984	Home: 1988	Away: 2003	Away: 2007–09	Away: 2010–11	Away: 2011–12
Alternative: 2011–13	Away: 2013–14	Away: 2014–15	Away: 2015–16	Alternative: 2014–16	Away: 2017–18	Alternative: 2017–18

1980s–2016	1990s	2010–13	2013–14

Motagua's traditional colour is dark blue, representing the blue waters of the Motagua River. This is because at the time the club was founded, the river was in dispute between Honduras and Guatemala. Since 2011, Motagua has worn pink jerseys for all their games during October for National Breast Cancer Awareness Month.

The Motagua badge has a blue eagle. This is because one of the three clubs that united to become Motagua was named CD Águila, or Eagle in Spanish.

=== Stadium ===
Motagua plays their home matches at Estadio Nacional Chelato Uclés in Tegucigalpa. The stadium is named after Honduran football player and manager Chelato Uclés. The stadium is divided into Sol Norte, Sol Sur, Sol Centro, Preferencia, Silla and Palco. The Motaguan supporters "La Revo" are located at Sol Norte and the "Macro Azurra" sits in Sol Centro.

=== Traditions ===
There are some traditions within the Motagua institution.

When a player debuts, he must shave his head. This is optional. Most of the players that do shave are recently promoted from the reserve team or are young of age.

=== Supporters ===
Motagua has many supporters throughout Honduras. Motagua has one barra brava and three other supporters' groups. The barra brava is "Los Revolucionarios del Motagua 1928", who call themselves "La Revo". This fan group has "bandas" or smaller groups inside La Revo such as (from Tegucigalpa) "Los Fuser", "Los Dementes", "Escuadron 57", "Comando 21", "Los Poltershe", "Irreverentes", "Capone", "Infernales", "Danger's", "Anarkia", etc. (from Comayagua) "C26", (from San Pedro Sula) "Los Del Norte", (from La Ceiba) "Revo Ceiba", (from Choluteca) "Revo Choluteca", (from El Progreso) "Revo Progreso", (from Siguatepeque) "Revo Sigua". All of the "bandas" hang "mantas" or huge pieces of cloth saying their banda's name inside the stadium. They also hang one with the barra's website and many of Che Guevara. At matches from Motagua against Olimpia, it is illegal to hang these mantas because some of the members steal them, so police have banned this.

Another of the biggest fan groups is "Macro Azurra" which is supported by the club. They can be easily be spotted in the stadium because they usually have blue ballons. This group is bigger in the northern territory and is sponsored by the club and by FedEx.

There are also two smaller groups, "Fortaleza Azul" and "JAH", which stands for "Justicia Amor y Humildad", which means "Justice Love and Humbleness". JAH is a religious fan group which was founded by seven members of the Jehová es Nuestro Pastor church. JAH say that their trips are paid by God.

=== Sponsorship ===
Period	Kit manufacturer	Main shirt sponsor
1928–86	Unknown	none
1987–89	Unknown	Pepsi
1990–92	Unknown	Castillo Galo
1992–93	Unknown	TACA
1993–94	Unknown	Esso Super Oil
1994–95	Unknown	Banco Ficohsa
1996	Umbro	Banco Ficohsa
1997–98	ABA Sport	Pepsi
1999–00	Joma	Pepsi
2001	Joma	Imperial
2002–2026	Joma	Pepsi
2026–	Fanatics	Pepsi

Period	Secondary jersey sponsor
1997–1999	Fujifilm; Mazda
1999–2005	Diunsa
2005–2008	Chevrolet
2008–2009	Infarma
2009–2011	Tigo
2013–2014	Volkswagen
2014–2015	TiGris
2015–present	Claro

Period	Third-party sponsor of T-shirt
2007–2009	Claro
2007–2011	Gatorade
2009–2012	FedEx
2011–2014	Alinter
2013–2014	BetCris
2014–2015	Kia
2015–2018	Gatorade
2016–present	Diunsa

== Rivalries ==
=== Superclásico ===
El Clasico Capitalino (The Capital's Classic) or Superclásico Hondureño (Honduran Super Classic) is played between Motagua and Club Deportivo Olimpia. Their matches are also known as El Clasico Local (The Local Classic) in Tegucigalpa. There is a huge rivalry between the clubs and their fans (La Ultra Fiel [of Olimpia] and La Revo [of Motagua]).

=== Clásico de las M's ===
El Clásico de las M's (The M's Classic) or El Derbi de las M's (The M's Derby) is a derby football match played between Motagua from Tegucigalpa and C.D. Marathón from San Pedro Sula, two of the most successful and popular football teams in Honduras.

=== Motagua–Real España ===
The Motagua–Real España derby has been contested in seven intense league finals, four won by Real España and three by Motagua. The series has a fairly even record.

=== Short-lived ===
One smaller rivalry, which might be called extinct, was against Universidad (also known as UNAH). The club named Universidad, represented the Honduran National Autonomous University in Tegucigalpa, and therefore shared the city with Motagua. This inspired a local derby until UNAH was relocated to Choluteca. UNAH on various occasions left Motagua out of the play-offs, intensifying the rivalry. This derby can now be called extinct since Universidad were relegated to the Liga de Ascenso. The club was eventually sold to, and renamed, Universidad Pedagogica Nacional-Francisco Morázan (also known as UPNFM) (National Pedagogical University-Francisco Morázan).

== Honours ==
Motagua is the second most successful club in Honduras, having won 20 domestic leagues since the inauguration of the Honduran Liga Nacional in 1965–66.

=== Domestic ===
- Honduran Liga Nacional
  - Winners (20): 1968–69, 1970–71, 1973–74, 1978–79, 1991–92, 1997–98 A, 1997–98 C, 1999–2000 A, 1999–2000 C, 2001–02 A, 2006–07 A, 2010–11 C, 2014–15 A, 2016–17 A, 2016–17 C, 2018–19 A, 2018–19 C, 2021–22 C, 2024–25 A, 2025–26 C
  - Runners-up (16): 1969–70, 1974–75, 1976–77, 1982–83, 1990–91, 1993–94, 2002–03 C, 2007–08 A, 2009–10 C, 2014–15 C, 2015–16 A, 2017–18 A, 2017–18 C, 2020–21 C, 2022–23 A, 2023–24 A
- Honduran Cup
  - Winners (1): 1968
  - Runners-up (4): 1993, 1995, 1997, 1998
- Honduran Supercup
  - Winners (2): 1999, 2017
- Amateur era
  - Honduran Amateur League: 1948, 1950–51
  - Francisco Morazán Major League: 1947, 1948, 1950, 1951, 1954

=== International ===
==== Continental ====
- CONCACAF League
  - Runners-up (3): 2018, 2019, 2021

==== Regional ====
- UNCAF Interclub Cup
  - Winners (1): 2007

=== Friendly ===
- Copa Corona del Rosal (1): 1968
- Copa Burra Rivas (1): 2014
- Copa Amistad Padre Alberto Gauci (1): 2015
- Copa Ciclón (1): 2015

== Records ==
=== Performance by year ===
Regular season			Post season		Cup	Supercup	UNCAF	CONCACAF	CONMEBOL
Season	Finish	Record	Finish	Record	Finish				
1965–66	9th	3–4–11 (14:25)	No play-offs		Not held				Didn't enter
1966–67	9th	5–3–10 (24:31)	No play-offs		Not held				Didn't enter
1967–68	6th	6–5–7 (22:21)	No play-offs		Not held			Didn't enter	
1968–69	Winners	17–5–5 (45:23)	No play-offs		Winners	Not held		Didn't enter	
1969–70	Runner-up	13–9–5 (38:26)	No play-offs		Not held			First round	Didn't enter
1960s record		44–26–38 (143:126)	0–0–0 (0:0)						
Regular season			Post season		Cup	Supercup	UNCAF	CONCACAF	CONMEBOL
Season	Finish	Record	Finish	Record	Finish				
1970–71	1st	13–11–3 (43:18)	Winners	0–1–0 (1:1)	Not held			Didn't enter	
1971–72	3rd	14–5–8 (37:23)	No play-offs		Not held		Didn't enter	First round	Didn't enter
1972–73	1st	6–3–0 (18:7)	No play-offs		4th	Not held	Didn't enter		
1973–74	Winners	13–13–1 (39:15)	No play-offs		Not held		Didn't enter		
1974–75	1st	18–15–3 (44:19)	Finalist	0–2–2 (1:3)	Not held		Didn't enter	Second round	Didn't enter
1975–76	2nd	9–14–4 (27:18)	Final 4 round	2–4–1 (5:4)	Not held		Didn't enter	First round	Didn't enter
1976–77	2nd	13–9–5 (27:12)	Finalist	4–2–2 (10:10)	Not held		Didn't enter	Second round	Didn't enter
1977–78	4th	11–8–8 (27:21)	Final 5 round	3–4–1 (11:9)	Not held		Didn't enter		
1978–79	1st	13–12–2 (34:16)	Winners	6–1–3 (17:9)	Not held		Didn't enter		
1979–80	5th	9–9–9 (29:29)	Play-off loss	0–0–1 (1:2)	Not held		Group stage	Didn't enter	
1970s record		113–96–43 (307:171)	15–14–10 (46:38)						
All-time record		157–122–81 (450:297)	15–14–10 (46:38)						
Combined record		172–136–91 (496:335)							
Regular season			Post season		Cup	Supercup	UNCAF	CONCACAF	CONMEBOL
Season	Finish	Record	Finish	Record	Finish				
1980–81	6th	6–15–6 (32:31)	Didn't enter		Not held		Didn't enter		
1981–82	2nd	15–8–7 (35:25)	Final 5 round	4–3–2 (14:8)	Not held		Didn't enter		
1982–83	2nd	9–13–5 (31:28)	Final 5 round	2–5–1 (13:7)	Not held		Didn't enter		
1983–84	6th	14–8–14 (36:36)	No play-offs		Not held		Didn't enter	First round	Didn't enter
1984–85	5th	11–13–12 (30:33)	Didn't enter		Not held		Didn't enter		
1985–86	2nd B	5–9–4 (12:17)	Final 4 round	2–2–2 (6:6)	Not held			Didn't enter	
1986–87	3rd B	8–12–7 (27:26)	Play-off loss	0–0–1 (3:5)	Not held			Intermediate round	Didn't enter
1987–88	3rd B	9–8–10 (32:37)	Didn't enter		Not held			Didn't enter	
1988–89	2nd B	10–12–5 (26:18)	Final 5 round	2–4–3 (4:8)	Not held			Didn't enter	
1989–90	2nd B	9–10–8 (29:23)	Final 5 round	2–3–3 (5:8)	Not held			Didn't enter	
1980s record		96–108–78 (290:274)	12–17–12 (45:42)						
All-time record		253–230–159 (740:571)	27–31–22 (91:80)						
Combined record		280–261–181 (831:651)							
Regular season			Post season		Cup	Supercup	UNCAF	CONCACAF	CONMEBOL
Season	Finish	Record	Finish	Record	Finish				
1990–91	5th	6–14–7 (26:23)	Finalist	5–4–2 (8:5)	Not held			Didn't enter	
1991–92	1st	16–5–6 (38:19)	Winners	1–3–6 (4:14)	Not held			First round	Didn't enter
1992–93	5th	10–10–7 (41:34)	Final 5 round	2–3–3 (10:13)	Group stage	Not held		Second round	Didn't enter
1993–94	4th	7–12–8 (28:27)	Final 3 round	2–3–1 (5:4)	Finalist	Not held		Second round	Didn't enter
1994–95	2nd	15–9–3 (42:21)	Final 6 round	0–0–2 (2:6)	Semi-finalist	Not held		Didn't enter	
1995–96	3rd	11–7–9 (36:28)	Final 3 round	3–0–3 (8:8)	2nd	Not held	Withdrew	First round	Didn't enter
1996–97	4th	11–9–7 (37:25)	Final 6 round	0–1–1 (3:4)	4th	Not held	Group stage	Didn't enter	
1997–98 A	2nd	10–7–3 (23:17)	Winners	3–2–1 (8:4)	2nd	Didn't enter	Group stage	Didn't enter	
1997–98 C	2nd	14–4–2 (39:15)	Winners	3–3–0 (11:6)	2nd	Didn't enter	Group stage	Didn't enter	
1998–99	2nd	7–7–4 (24:20)	Semi-finalist	2–0–2 (5:7)	2nd	Winners	Group stage	Didn't enter	
1999–2000 A	1st	10–7–1 (39:16)	Winners	2–4–0 (6:3)	Not held		Didn't enter		
1999–2000 C	3rd	9–7–2 (26:17)	Winners	2–4–0 (8:6)	Not held		Didn't enter		
1990s record		126–98–59 (399:262)	25–27–21 (78:80)						
All-time record		379–328–218 (1139:833)	52–58–43 (169:160)						
Combined record		431–386–261 (1308:993)							
Regular season			Post season		Cup	Supercup	UNCAF	CONCACAF	CONMEBOL
Season	Finish	Record	Finish	Record	Finish				
2000–01 A	2nd	7–8–3 (20:15)	Final 6 round	0–1–1 (2:3)	Not held		Group stage	Didn't enter	
2000–01 C	7th	2–12–4 (23:27)	Final 6 round	0–1–1 (2:3)	Not held		Group stage	Didn't enter	
2001–02 A	1st	8–8–2 (22:13)	Winners	2–0–2 (7:6)	Not held		Didn't enter		
2001–02 C	8th	4–7–7 (12:16)	Didn't enter		Not held		Didn't enter		
2002–03 A	5th	7–5–6 (24:23)	Didn't enter		Not held		3rd	First round	Didn't enter
2002–03 C	4th	8–4–6 (21:16)	Finalist	1–1–2 (5:6)	Not held		3rd	First round	Didn't enter
2003–04 A	5th	7–3–8 (22:22)	Didn't enter		Not held		Didn't enter		
2003–04 C	5th	6–5–5 (22:20)	Didn't enter		Not held		Didn't enter		
2004–05 A	9th	4–6–8 (20:25)	Didn't enter		Not held		Didn't enter		
2004–05 C	5th	4–11–3 (18:18)	Didn't enter		Not held		Didn't enter		
2005–06 A	10th	3–5–10 (16:26)	Didn't enter		Not held		Didn't enter		
2005–06 C	4th	8–5–5 (24:20)	Semi-finalist	1–0–1 (3:3)	Not held		Didn't enter		
2006–07 A	2nd	9–4–5 (27:22)	Winners	2–1–1 (10:4)	Not held		Didn't enter		
2006–07 C	4th	10–1–7 (31:26)	Semi-finalist	0–0–2 (1:4)	Not held		Didn't enter		
2007–08 A	2nd	9–5–4 (28:19)	Finalist	1–2–1 (3:3)	Not held		Winners	Quarter-finalist	Didn't enter
2007–08 C	4th	8–3–7 (23:19)	Semi-finalist	0–0–2 (2:7)	Not held		Winners	Quarter-finalist	Didn't enter
2008–09 A	3rd	9–3–6 (24:21)	Semi-finalist	1–0–1 (1:1)	Not held			Didn't enter	First round
2008–09 C	8th	4–7–7 (13:21)	Didn't enter		Not held			Didn't enter	First round
2009–10 A	2nd	10–5–3 (31:14)	Semi-finalist	1–0–1 (1:2)	Not held			Didn't enter	
2009–10 C	1st	11–3–4 (28:15)	Finalist	1–2–1 (4:5)	Not held			Didn't enter	
2000s record		138–110–110 (449:398)	10–8–16 (41:47)						
All-time record		517–438–328 (1588:1231)	62–66–59 (210:207)						
Combined record		579–504–387 (1798:1438)							
Regular season			Post season		Cup	Supercup	UNCAF / CFU	CONCACAF	CONMEBOL
Season	Finish	Record	Finish	Record	Finish				
2010–11 A	7th	5–6–7 (21:25)	Didn't enter		Not held			Preliminary round	Didn't enter
2010–11 C	2nd	8–7–3 (25:17)	Winners	2–1–1 (8:6)	Not held			Preliminary round	Didn't enter
2011–12 A	7th	6–4–8 (20:19)	Didn't enter		Not held			Group stage	Didn't enter
2011–12 C	2nd	7–11–0 (22:10)	Semi-finalist	0–1–1 (0:2)	Not held			Group stage	Didn't enter
2012–13 A	3rd	6–8–4 (21:15)	Semi-finalist	2–2–0 (10:6)	Not held			Didn't enter	
2012–13 C	7th	6–4–8 (27:23)	Didn't enter		Not held			Didn't enter	
2013–14 A	9th	5–6–7 (25:27)	Didn't enter		Not held			Didn't enter	
2013–14 C	4th	8–5–5 (20:16)	Play-off loss	0–1–1 (1:2)	Not held			Didn't enter	
2014–15 A	3rd	8–4–6 (30:25)	Winners	4–2–0 (8:4)	3rd	Not held		Didn't enter	
2014–15 C	2nd	11–4–3 (37:21)	Finalist	1–1–2 (4:3)	3rd	Not held		Didn't enter	
2015–16 A	2nd	9–5–4 (41:25)	Finalist	0–4–0 (6:6)	Quarter-finalist	abandoned	Not held	Group stage	Didn't enter
2015–16 C	4th	9–3–6 (28:22)	Semi-finalist	1–1–2 (3:3)	Quarter-finalist	abandoned	Not held	Group stage	Didn't enter
2016–17 A	4th	7–7–4 (30:24)	Winners	3–2–1 (7:5)	Round of 64	Didn't enter	Not held	Didn't enter	Didn't enter
2016–17 C	2nd	9–7–2 (35:21)	Winners	3–1–0 (11:4)	Round of 64	Didn't enter	Not held	Didn't enter	Didn't enter
2017–18 A	2nd	9–6–3 (31:21)	Finalist	2–0–2 (5:6)	Not held	Winners	Didn't enter	Round of 16	Didn't enter
2017–18 C	2nd	10–4–4 (29:17)	Finalist	0–4–0 (2:2)	Not held	Winners	Didn't enter	Round of 16	Didn't enter
2018–19 A	1st	11–4–3 (28:11)	Winners	3–0–1 (6:2)	Round of 64	Didn't enter	Finalist	Didn't enter	Didn't enter
2018–19 C	3rd	9–4–5 (29:15)	Winners	3–3–0 (10:4)	Round of 64	Didn't enter	Finalist	Didn't enter	Didn't enter
2019–20 A	3rd	9–4–5 (26:21)	Final 5 round	3–0–1 (10:5)	Not held	Not held	Finalist	Round of 16	Didn't enter
2019–20 C	1st	8–3–2 (25:10)	abandoned		Not held	Not held	Finalist	Round of 16	Didn't enter
2010s record		160–106–89 (550:385)	27–23–12 (91:60)						
All-time record		677–544–417 (2138:1616)	89–89–71 (301:267)						
Combined record		766–633–488 (2439:1883)							
Regular season			Post season		Cup	Supercup	UNCAF / CFU	CONCACAF	CONMEBOL
Season	Finish	Record	Finish	Record	Finish				
2020–21 A	2nd A	10–2–2 (33:10)	Finalist	3–1–2 (9:7)	Not held	Not held	Play-in round	Didn't enter	Didn't enter
2020–21 C	2nd A	9–4–1 (29:14)	Finalist	3–1–2 (7:4)	Not held	Not held	Play-in round	Didn't enter	Didn't enter
2021–22 A	4th	10–5–3 (37:20)	Semi-finalist	2–1–1 (6:5)	Not held	Not held	Finalist	Round of 16	Didn't enter
2021–22 C	4th	8–4–6 (25:16)	Winners	3–2–1 (8:3)	Not held	Not held	Finalist	Round of 16	Didn't enter
2022–23 A	2nd	9–5–4 (32:24)	Finalist	1–1–2 (2:4)	Not held	Not held	Semi-finalist	Quarter-finalist	Didn't enter
2022–23 C	5th	6–7–5 (26:24)	Playoff loss	0–1–1 (1:2)	Not held	Not held	Semi-finalist	Quarter-finalist	Didn't enter
2023–24 A	3rd	8–5–5 (32:22)	Finalist	1–4–1 (8:8)	Not held	Not held	Play-in loss	Didn't enter	Didn't enter
2023–24 C	2nd	9–7–2 (30:15)	Semi-finalist	0–1–1 (6:7)	Not held	Not held	Play-in loss	Didn't enter	Didn't enter
2024–25 A	2nd	10–4–4 (37:21)	Winners	3–1–0 (5:1)	Not held	Not held	Play-in win	Qualified	Didn't enter
2024–25 C	TBD	0–0–0 (0:0)	TBD	0–0–0 (0:0)	Not held	Not held	Play-in win	Qualified	Didn't enter
2020s record		79–43–32 (281:166)	16–13–11 (52:41)						
All-time record		755–591–446 (2417:1777)	105–102–82 (353:308)						
Combined record		860–693–528 (2770:2085)							

=== International performance ===
CONCACAF Champions Cup
Season	GP	W	D	L	GF	GA	GD	Finish
1969	2	0	1	1	1	5	–4	First round
1971	2	0	0	2	0	5	–5	First round
1974	4	2	1	1	3	4	–1	Second round
1975	2	1	0	1	2	3	–1	First round
1977	0	0	0	0	0	0	0	Withdrew
1983	2	1	0	1	3	4	–1	First round
1986	6	3	1	2	10	9	+1	Intermediate round
1991	2	0	1	1	1	2	–1	First round
1992	4	1	1	2	3	6	–3	Second round
1993	4	2	0	2	8	3	+5	Second round
1995	2	0	0	2	0	4	–4	First round
2003	2	0	1	1	2	3	–1	First round
2008	2	0	1	1	0	1	–1	Quarter-finalist
2010–11	2	0	1	1	2	3	–1	Preliminary round
2011–12	8	1	0	7	6	16	–10	Group stage
2015–16	4	2	1	1	5	6	–1	Group stage
2018	2	0	1	1	1	2	–1	Round of 16
2020	2	0	1	1	1	4	–3	Round of 16
2022	2	0	1	1	0	5	–5	Round of 16
2023	4	0	2	2	1	7	–6	Quarter-finalist
2025	2	0	1	1	2	5	–3	Round one
Totals	60	13	15	32	51	97	–46	—
CONCACAF Central American Cup
Season	GP	W	D	L	GF	GA	GD	Finish
2023	8	3	2	3	12	14	–2	Play-in loss
2024	8	3	4	1	15	10	+5	Play-in win
2025	8	2	2	4	10	12	-2	Play-in loss
2026	5	3	2	0	11	2	+9	TBD
Totals	29	11	10	8	48	38	+10	—
CONCACAF League
Season	GP	W	D	L	GF	GA	GD	Finish
2018	8	6	0	2	13	7	+6	Finalist
2019	8	3	4	1	9	4	+5	Finalist
2020	4	0	3	1	5	7	–2	Quarter-finalist
2021	8	3	3	2	12	10	+2	Finalist
2022	6	2	3	1	3	1	+2	Semi-finalist
Totals	34	14	13	7	42	29	+13	—
CONCACAF Giants Cup
Season	GP	W	D	L	GF	GA	GD	Finish
2001	2	0	1	1	1	5	–4	First round
Totals	2	0	1	1	1	5	–4	—
UNCAF Interclub Cup
Season	GP	W	D	L	GF	GA	GD	Finish
1999	7	1	4	2	4	6	–2	Group stage
2001	3	0	1	2	1	3	–2	Group stage
2002	6	3	1	2	10	11	–1	Third place
2007	8	7	1	0	15	5	+10	Winners
Totals	24	11	7	6	30	25	+5	—
Copa Fraternidad (unofficial)
Season	GP	W	D	L	GF	GA	GD	Finish
1979	10	2	3	5	10	16	–6	Group stage
Totals	10	2	3	5	10	16	–6	—
Torneo Grandes de Centroamérica (unofficial)
Season	GP	W	D	L	GF	GA	GD	Finish
1996	0	0	0	0	0	0	0	Withdrew
1997	6	1	4	1	8	8	0	Group stage
1997–98	6	0	5	1	2	3	–1	Group stage
Totals	12	1	9	2	10	11	–1	—
Copa Sudamericana
Season	GP	W	D	L	GF	GA	GD	Finish
2008	2	0	0	2	1	6	–5	First round
Totals	2	0	0	2	1	6	–5	—
Combined record	150	44	49	57	155	198	–43	—

=== League records ===
- As of 2021–22
- Click 'show' to expand details

Fewest goals conceded in a season
- 12 goals in 20 games in the 2011–12 Clausura season
Most games undefeated
- 33 games from round 7 of 1973–74 season to round 12 of 1974–75 season
Fewest losses in a season
- 1 loss in the 1973–74, 1999–00 Apertura and 2011–12 Clausura seasons
Most wins in a season
- 18 wins in 39 games in the 1974–75 season
Most goals scored in a season
- 51 goals scored in the 1978–79 and 1992–93 seasons
Most losses in a season
- 13 losses in the 1983–84 season
Biggest defeat
- Motagua 0–5 Vida in the 1985–86 season, Marathón 5–0 Motagua in the 2012–13 Clausura season and Real España 5–0 Motagua in the 2014–15 Apertura season
Biggest win
- Motagua 7–0 Súper Estrella in the 1991–92 season
Most goals conceded in a season
- 47 goals conceded in the 1992–93 season
Best position in league
- National champions with 58 points made in 26 games in the 1997–98 Clausura season
Most goals in same match
- Motagua 8–2 Vida in the 1999–00 Apertura season
Fewest wins in a season
- 2 wins in 20 games in the 2000–01 Clausura season
Fewest goals in a season
- 12 goals in 18 games in the 2001–02 Clausura season
Worst position in league
- 10th in 18 games in the 2005–06 Apertura season

=== All time top scorers ===
- As of 2024–25 Apertura

No.	Player	Goals
1	(Honduras) Rubilio Castillo	113
2	(Honduras) Ángel Obando	77
3	(Honduras) Amado Guevara	70
4	(Paraguay) Roberto Moreira	69
5	(Honduras) Óscar Hernández	59
6	(Honduras) Luis Reyes	54
7	(Honduras) Jairo Martínez	53
8	(Honduras) Carlos Discua	52
9	(Honduras) Mario Blandón	48
10	(Honduras) Geovanny Castro	40

=== All-time record vs. opponents ===
==== International level ====
- Updated 16 September 2026

Opponent	First meeting	Last meeting	Pld	W	D	L	GF	GA	GD
(El Salvador) Águila	23 Oct 2024	30 Oct 2024	2	1	1	0	4	2	+2
(Costa Rica) Alajuelense	25 Apr 1992	30 Sep 2025	9	1	1	7	8	24	−16
(El Salvador) Alianza	2 Mar 1979	9 Sep 2026	8	2	5	1	13	8	+5
(Mexico) América	5 Aug 2015	20 Oct 2015	2	0	1	1	1	5	−4
(Panama) Árabe Unido	18 Dec 2002	18 Dec 2002	1	0	0	1	1	2	−1
(Argentina) Arsenal	19 Aug 2008	4 Sep 2008	2	0	0	2	1	6	−5
(United States) Atlanta United FC	18 Feb 2020	25 Feb 2020	2	0	1	1	1	4	–3
(El Salvador) Atlético Marte	4 May 1986	18 May 1986	2	1	0	1	4	2	+2
(Guatemala) Aurora	25 Feb 1979	20 Nov 1997	3	0	1	2	3	6	−3
(Belize) Belmopan Bandits	31 Jul 2018	7 Aug 2018	2	2	0	0	3	0	+3
(Costa Rica) Cartaginés	5 May 1974	12 Aug 2026	6	2	2	2	5	5	0
(Dominican Republic) Cibao	17 Aug 2022	24 Aug 2022	2	2	0	0	3	0	+3
(Guatemala) Comunicaciones	27 Jul 1986	14 Dec 2021	18	4	10	4	20	23	–3
(Nicaragua) Diriangén	30 Jul 2024	30 Jul 2024	1	0	0	1	1	2	–1
(El Salvador) FAS	6 Aug 2026	6 Aug 2026	1	1	0	0	1	0	+1
(United States) FC Cincinnati	19 Feb 2025	26 Feb 2025	2	0	1	1	2	5	–3
(Canada) Forge	24 Nov 2021	1 Dec 2021	2	0	2	0	2	2	0
(Costa Rica) Herediano	4 May 1975	2 Oct 2024	7	2	3	2	7	9	−2
(Panama) Independiente	23 Sep 2023	5 Aug 2025	3	1	1	1	3	4	−1
(Belize) Juventus	26 Jun 1993	18 Jul 1999	4	2	2	0	9	2	+7
(United States) LA Galaxy	16 Mar 2003	20 Oct 2011	4	0	1	3	2	6	−4
(El Salvador) Firpo	24 Feb 1999	25 Jul 1999	2	1	0	1	2	2	0
(Nicaragua) Managua	20 Aug 2019	27 Aug 2019	2	1	1	0	3	2	+1
(Honduras) Marathón	1 Nov 2002	2 Nov 2021	3	3	0	0	6	1	+5
(Mexico) Morelia	25 Aug 2011	22 Sep 2011	2	0	0	2	0	6	−6
(Guatemala) Municipal	21 Jun 1974	25 Aug 2026	11	4	3	4	12	12	0
(United States) NY Pancyprian-Freedoms	10 Apr 1983	26 Apr 1983	2	1	0	1	3	4	−1
(Honduras) Olancho	17 Aug 2023	17 Aug 2023	1	1	0	0	1	0	+1
(Honduras) Olimpia	11 Feb 1979	11 Oct 2022	5	1	2	2	2	4	–2
(Mexico) Pachuca	11 Mar 2008	16 Mar 2023	4	0	3	1	1	2	−1
(Bermuda) Pembroke Hamilton	31 Aug 1986	6 Sep 1986	2	1	0	1	3	5	−2
(Jamaica) Portmore United	23 Aug 2018	30 Aug 2018	2	2	0	0	5	2	+3
(Honduras) Real España	29 Nov 1997	29 Nov 1997	1	0	1	0	0	0	0
(Nicaragua) Real Estelí	7 Aug 2007	9 Dec 2020	3	2	1	0	7	3	+4
(Panama) San Francisco	18 Sep 2007	6 Aug 2024	3	3	0	0	5	2	+3
(El Salvador) Santiagueño	4 Mar 1979	1 Apr 1979	2	0	0	2	2	6	−4
(Costa Rica) Saprissa	25 Apr 1969	26 Aug 2025	20	1	8	11	9	31	−22
(United States) Seattle Sounders FC	17 Feb 2022	24 Feb 2022	2	0	1	1	0	5	−5
(Panama) Sporting San Miguelito	9 Aug 2023	9 Aug 2023	1	1	0	0	2	0	+2
(Panama) Tauro	17 Aug 2001	13 Aug 2024	7	3	2	2	9	5	+4
(Mexico) Tijuana	21 Feb 2018	27 Feb 2018	2	0	1	1	1	2	−1
(Canada) Toronto FC	27 Jul 2010	3 Aug 2010	2	0	1	1	2	3	−1
(Mexico) UANL	5 Apr 2023	13 Apr 2023	2	0	0	2	0	6	–6
(Panama) Universitario	23 Sep 2021	30 Sep 2021	2	1	1	0	3	2	+1
(Belize) Verdes	2 Aug 2023	28 Jul 2026	3	3	0	0	14	1	+13
(Nicaragua) Walter Ferretti	27 Aug 2015	24 Sep 2015	2	2	0	0	4	1	+3
(Jamaica) Waterhouse	25 Sep 2019	2 Oct 2019	2	1	1	0	2	0	+2
Totals			173	53	58	62	192	224	–32

- Friendly matches not included.
- Games decided by penalty shootout are counted as ties.

== Squad ==
=== First-team squad ===
As of 12 April, 2026

Note: Flags indicate national team as defined under FIFA eligibility rules; some limited exceptions apply. Players may hold more than one non-FIFA nationality.

No.	Pos.	Nation	Player
2	DF	HON	Pablo Cacho
3	DF	HON	Carlos Meléndez
4	DF	HON	Luis Vega
5	MF	HON	Óscar Discua
6	DF	HON	Riky Zapata
7	FW	PAN	Jorge Serrano
8	MF	HON	Denis Meléndez
10	FW	ARG	Rodrigo Gómez
11	FW	BRA	Romario
12	DF	HON	Marcelo Santos (captain)
14	FW	HON	Aarón Barrios
15	FW	HON	Andy Hernández
17	DF	HON	Jhen Clever Portillo
19	FW	URU	Rodrigo De Olivera

No.	Pos.	Nation	Player
21	MF	HON	Luis Meléndez
22	GK	HON	Luis Ortiz
23	MF	HON	Alejandro Reyes
25	GK	HON	Marlon Licona
26	DF	HON	Luís Santamaría
27	MF	HON	Jefryn Macías
28	MF	HON	Adner Ávila
29	FW	BRA	John Kleber
31	GK	USA	John Turcios
33	DF	HON	Emilio Izaguirre
34	DF	HON	Giancarlo Sacaza
35	DF	HON	Cristopher Meléndez
77	MF	HON	Carlos Mejía

=== Reserve team ===
Note: Flags indicate national team as defined under FIFA eligibility rules; some limited exceptions apply. Players may hold more than one non-FIFA nationality.

No.	Pos.	Nation	Player
42	DF	HON	Jonathan Argueta
51	DF	HON	Jordan García

No.	Pos.	Nation	Player
56	MF	HON	Gabriel Palma

=== On loan ===
Note: Flags indicate national team as defined under FIFA eligibility rules; some limited exceptions apply. Players may hold more than one non-FIFA nationality.

No.	Pos.	Nation	Player
—	GK	HON	Enrique Facussé (at Westchester SC until 30 June 2026)
—	MF	HON	Héctor Castellanos (at Génesis Policía Nacional until 30 June 2026)

No.	Pos.	Nation	Player
—	MF	HON	Edwin Maldonado (at Génesis Policía Nacional until 30 June 2026)

==== Retired numbers ====
16 – (Honduras) Edy Vásquez, retired for 2 years (2007–09) in memorian of his death.

20 – (Honduras) Amado Guevara, retired.

=== Current technical staff ===
Position	Staff
Head coach	(Spain) Javier López
Assistant coaches	(Honduras) Júnior Izaguirre (Guatemala) Adrián Barrios
Goalkeeping coach	(Honduras) Hugo Caballero
Physiotherapists	(Honduras) Jorge Luis Pacheco (Honduras) Gerardo Mejía
Club doctor	(Honduras) José Avilés

Last updated: 23 October 2022

== Former presidents ==
- Marco Antonio Rosa
- Edgardo Zúniga
- Manuel Cáceres
- Celestino Cáceres
- Gonzalo Carías
- César Romero
- Antonio Urquía
- Juda Guzmán
- Silverio Henríquez
- Lurio Martínez
- Carlos Arriaga
- Carlos Amador
- Carlos Cruz
- Mario Rivera López
- Joaquín González
- Octasiano Valerio
- Horacio Fortín
- Saturnino Vidaurreta
- Heriberto Gómez
- Tulio Bueso
- Fausto Flores
- Gustavo Adolfo Alvarado
- Pedro Atala Simón
- Salvador Lamas
- Juan Ángel Arias
- Cristóbal Simón
- Francisco Zepeda
- Leónidas Rosa Bautista
- Jorge Abudoj
- Eduardo Atala
- Marco Tulio Gutiérrez
- Javier Atala
- Pedro Atala
- Julio Gutiérrez (current)

== Former managers ==
- (Hungary) Moni Mizzin
- (Hungary) Horacio Brummer (1964)
- (Honduras) Ernesto Henríquez (1965)
- (Honduras) Rodolfo Godoy (1966–67, 1969)
- (Argentina) Juan Colechio (1968)
- (Honduras) José Herrera (1969)
- (Honduras) Carlos Padilla (1970–74)
- (Honduras) Ángel Rodríguez (1976)
- (Honduras) Hermes Romero (1977)
- (Chile) Néstor Matamala (1978)
- (Honduras) Rodolfo Godoy (1980)
- (Uruguay) José Materas (1981)
- (Honduras) Carlos Padilla (1982, 1983–90)
- (Honduras) Óscar Nolasco (1985)
- (Honduras) Rubén Guifarro (1985–87)
- (Honduras) Gonzalo Zelaya (1987)
- (Uruguay) Carlos Jurado (1990)
- (Honduras) Ángel Rodríguez (1991–93)
- (Brazil) Roberto Abruzzesse (1993)
- (Honduras) Ramón Maradiaga (1993–95)
- (Uruguay) Carlos Jurado (1995–96)
- (Uruguay) Ernesto Luzardo (1996)
- (Honduras) Ramón Maradiaga (1997–99)
- (Mexico) José Treviño (1999–00)
- (Honduras) Luis "Chito" Reyes (2000)
- (El Salvador) Óscar Benítez (2000–01)
- (Honduras) Óscar "Cocli" Salgado (2001)
- (Uruguay) Julio González (2001)
- (Honduras) Gilberto Yearwood (2001–02)
- (Mexico) Alejandro Domínguez (2003)
- (Honduras) Hernaín Arzú (2003)
- (Brazil) Flavio Ortega (2004)
- (Honduras) Edwin Pavón (2005)
- (Honduras) Javier Padilla (2005)
- (Chile) Germán Cornejo (2005)
- (Honduras) Ramón Maradiaga (2006–07)
- (Honduras) Jorge Pineda (2008)
- (Honduras) Reynaldo Clavasquín (2008)
- (Colombia) Jaime de la Pava (2008–09)
- (Mexico) Juan Castillo (2009)
- (Honduras) Ramón Maradiaga (July 2009 – Sept 11)
- (Honduras) Luis "Chito" Reyes (2011)
- (Mexico) José Treviño (Sept 2011–12)
- (Honduras) Reynaldo Clavasquín (2012–13)
- (Mexico) Juan Castillo (2013)
- (Serbia) Risto Vidaković (2013)
- (Honduras) Milton Reyes (2013)
- (Argentina) Diego Vásquez (2014 – February 2022)
- (Honduras) César "Nene" Obando (February 2022 – March 2022)
- (Argentina) Hernán "La Tota" Medina (March 2022 – 2023)
- (Honduras) Ninrol Medina (2023)
- (Argentina) César Vigevani (September 2023 – November 2023)
- (Argentina) Diego Vásquez (November 2023 – July 2025)
- (Spain) Javier López López (August 2025 – present)

== Notable former players ==
See also Category:F.C. Motagua players
