= 1968 Honduran Cup =

Copa de Honduras 1968

Tournament details
- Host country: Honduras
- Dates: 27 October–22 December 1968
- Teams: 10

Final positions
- Champions: Motagua (1st title)
- Runners-up: España
- Third place: Platense

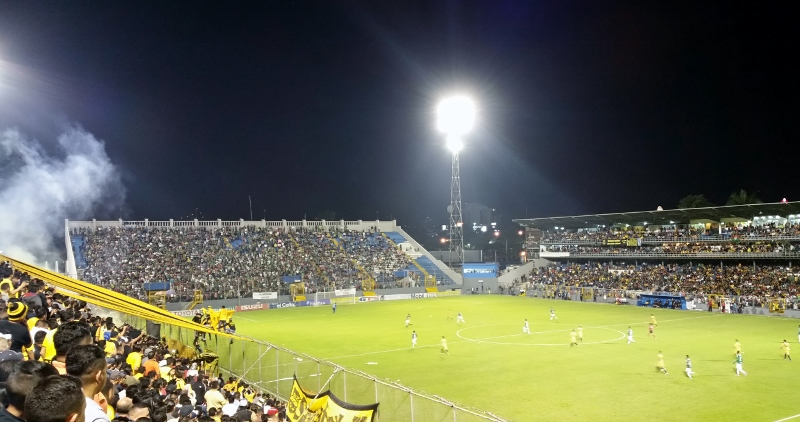
Francisco Morazan Stadium

The 1968 Honduran Cup was the first football cup played in Honduras, the tournament was won by Motagua and it was divided into two groups of five, advancing the top two to the final round. The celebration and international recognition of the country's inaugural cup was overshadowed by the national team's loss eight months later in World Cup qualifications against El Salvador, which was played several weeks before both countries waged a four-day war.

== First round ==
=== Group A ===
Pos	Team	Pld	W	D	L	GF	GA	GD	Pts	Qualification
1	Motagua	4	3	1	0	9	2	+7	7	Semifinals
2	Atlético Indio	4	2	0	2	6	5	+1	4	Semifinals
3	Victoria	4	2	0	2	2	7	−5	4	
4	Olimpia	4	1	1	2	5	5	0	3	
5	Atlético Español	4	1	0	3	3	6	−3	2	

First match(es) will be played: unknown. Source:
Rules for classification: 1) Points; 2) Goal difference; 3) Goals scored.

=== Group B ===
Pos	Team	Pld	W	D	L	GF	GA	GD	Pts	Qualification
1	España	4	2	1	1	7	3	+4	5	Semifinals
2	Platense	4	1	2	1	8	7	+1	4	Semifinals
3	Marathón	4	1	2	1	5	5	0	4	
4	Vida	4	1	2	1	3	4	−1	4	
5	Honduras	4	1	1	2	3	7	−4	3	

First match(es) will be played: unknown. Source:
Rules for classification: 1) Points; 2) Goal difference; 3) Goals scored.

== Final Round ==
Oddly, instead of inter-crossing the winners and runner-ups of each group, the semifinals were played within the group contenders. In case of a leveled score after 90 minutes, the match was decided by a penalty shoot-out of three (3) shots pear team, taken by a single player.

=== Semifinals ===
15 December 1968	España	3–0	Platense	San Pedro Sula
	Marshall 42'; Garden 69'; Greenech 84'			Stadium: Estadio General Francisco Morazán

19 December 1968	Motagua	1–0	Atlético Español	Tegucigalpa
	Baptista 55'			Stadium: Estadio Tiburcio Carías Andino

=== Third place ===
22 December 1968	Platense	1–1 (3–3 p)	Atlético Español	San Pedro Sula
	Brooks 30'		30' Montoya	Stadium: Estadio General Francisco Morazán
	Penalties
	Garay (penalty scored) (penalty scored) (penalty scored)		(penalty scored) (penalty scored) (penalty scored) Gutiérrez
Note: After a 1–1 draw in 90 minutes of play and a 3–3 draw in penalty shoot-outs; Platense won in a coin toss.

=== Final ===
22 December 1968	España	2–2 (1–2 p)	Motagua	San Pedro Sula
	Greenech 59' 65'		44' Baptista; 61' Godoy	Stadium: Estadio General Francisco Morazán
	Penalties
	Hidalgo (penalty scored) (penalty missed) (penalty missed)		(penalty scored) (penalty scored) (penalty missed) Banegas

1968 Honduran Cup Champion

Motagua
1st title
