= Edy Vásquez =

Honduran footballer (1983-2007)

Personal information
- Full name: Edy Rafael Vásquez Andrade
- Date of birth: 31 October 1983
- Place of birth: Tegucigalpa, Honduras
- Date of death: 12 May 2007 (aged 23)
- Place of death: Tegucigalpa, Honduras
- Position: Midfielder

Senior career*
Years	Team	Apps	(Gls)
2003–2007	Motagua	63	(7)

International career^{‡}
2006	Honduras	3	(0)
- * Club domestic league appearances and goals as of 2007-05-12 ‡ National team caps and goals as of 2007

Edy Rafael Vásquez Andrade (31 October 1983 – 12 May 2007) was a Honduran football midfielder, who played for F.C. Motagua.

== Club career ==
Vasquez made his debut for Motagua on 3 April 2004, a 3–2 loss against Real España in the Estadio Olímpico Metropolitano in San Pedro Sula and played 63 matches wearing Motagua's blue shirt and scored 7 times. His scored his first goal on 13 March 2005, in a 2–1 win against Victoria in Tegucigalpa when he scored in the final minute.

His last game was on 29 April 2007 with a 1–0 win over Marathon and his last goal was against Hispano on 5 October 2006, in Tegucigalpa.

He suffered from a tibia and fibula fracture preventing him playing for most of the 2006–07 season.

== International career ==
Vásquez made his debut for Honduras in an August 2006 friendly match against Venezuela and has earned a total of 3 caps, scoring no goals.

His final international was an October 2006 friendly match against Guatemala.

== Personal life and death ==
Vásquez was a son of Sandra Andrade and he had a daughter with his fiancée Pamela Ocampo: Yeimi Alexandra.

He died in the Hospital Escuela in the morning of 12 May 2007, after the car which was carrying him crashed into a wall at the Fuerzas Armadas Boulevard in Colonia Las Brisas, Tegucigalpa. The accident left the driver and another passenger injured. Police stated all three were infused by alcohol.

Due to his death, the club team Motagua has retired his jersey number 16 in respect of his loyalty to the team.
