= Alejandro Reyes =

Alejandro Reyes may refer to:

- Alejandro Reyes (politician), Chilean lawyer and politician
- Alejandro Reyes (singer), Swiss-Chilean singer and songwriter
- Alejandro Reyes (squash player), Mexican squash player
- Alejandro Aguilar Reyes, Mexican sportswriter
