= 1971 CONCACAF Championship squads =

These are the squads for the countries that played in the 1971 CONCACAF Championship.

The age listed for each player is on 20 November 1971, the first day of the tournament. The numbers of caps and goals listed for each player do not include any matches played after the start of the tournament. The club listed is the club for which the player last played a competitive match before the tournament. The nationality for each club reflects the national association (not the league) to which the club is affiliated. A flag is included for coaches who are of a different nationality than their own national team.

Trinidad and Tobago had a single player represent a foreign club.

== Costa Rica ==
Head coach: Marvin Rodríguez

No.	Pos.	Player	Date of birth (age)	Caps	Club
1	GK	Juan Alberto Gutiérrez	6 March 1948 (aged 23)		(Costa Rica) Saprissa
2	GK	Didier Gutiérrez	7 July 1940 (aged 31)		(Costa Rica) Municipal Puntarenas
3	GK	Gladstone Edmond	20 March 1950 (aged 21)		(Costa Rica) Herediano
4	DF	Guillermo Hernández Rojas	3 April 1940 (aged 31)		(Costa Rica) Saprissa
5	DF	Jorge Peralta	21 September 1943 (aged 28)		(Costa Rica) Herediano
6	DF	Wálter Elizondo	4 November 1942 (aged 29)		(Costa Rica) Alajuelense
7	DF	Alfonso Estupiñán	4 June 1948 (aged 23)		(Costa Rica) Alajuelense
8	DF	Luis Fernando Solano	21 September 1945 (aged 26)		(Costa Rica) Saprissa
9	DF	Víctor Calvo	28 November 1945 (aged 25)		(Costa Rica) Alajuelense
10	DF	Álvaro Grant	3 February 1938 (aged 33)		(Costa Rica) Herediano
11	DF	Heriberto Rojas	18 June 1943 (aged 28)		(Costa Rica) Saprissa
12	MF	Asdrúbal Paniagua	29 July 1951 (aged 20)		(Costa Rica) Saprissa
13	MF	Álvaro Cascante	19 February 1945 (aged 26)		(Costa Rica) Herediano
14	MF	Hernán Morales	27 April 1951 (aged 20)		(Costa Rica) Saprissa
15	MF	José Manuel Rojas	8 June 1952 (aged 19)		(Costa Rica) Barrio México
16	MF	Pecas López	14 December 1942 (aged 28)		(Costa Rica) Cartaginés
17	FW	Edgar Marín	22 May 1943 (aged 28)		(Costa Rica) Saprissa
18	FW	Roy Sáenz	5 December 1944 (aged 26)		(Costa Rica) Alajuelense
19	FW	Emilio Enrique Valle	6 September 1949 (aged 22)		(Costa Rica) Barrio México
20	FW	Trino Mena	1 June 1947 (aged 24)		(Costa Rica) Municipal Puntarenas
21	FW	Vicente Wanchope	16 July 1946 (aged 25)		(Costa Rica) Herediano
22	FW	Fernando Rodríguez Mairena	15 August 1949 (aged 22)		(Costa Rica) Municipal Puntarenas

== Cuba ==
Head coach: (North Korea) Kim Yong-ha

No.	Pos.	Player	Date of birth (age)	Caps	Club
1	GK	José Francisco Reinoso	20 May 1950 (aged 21)		(Cuba) Azucareros
2	GK	Hugo Madera	24 November 1950 (aged 20)		(Cuba) Granjeros
3	GK	William Bennett	19 April 1951 (aged 20)		(Cuba) Mineros
4	DF	Lorenzo Sotomayor	2 February 1949 (aged 22)		(Cuba) Granjeros
5	DF	Luis Holmaza	12 September 1949 (aged 22)		(Cuba) La Habana
6	DF	Miguel Rivero	14 March 1952 (aged 19)		(Cuba) La Habana
7	DF	René Bonora	20 July 1952 (aged 19)		(Cuba) Granjeros
8	DF	Antonio Garcés	2 September 1950 (aged 21)		(Cuba) Granjeros
9	DF	Carlos Bracha	1949 (aged 21–22)		(Cuba) Granjeros
10	DF	Gabriel Valenzuela (captain)	1947 (aged 22–23)		(Cuba) Azucareros
11	MF	Andrés Roldán	28 February 1951 (aged 20)		(Cuba) Azucareros
12	MF	Luis Hernández	24 August 1949 (aged 22)		(Cuba) La Habana
13	MF	Dagoberto Lara	16 April 1953 (aged 18)		(Cuba) Azucareros
14	MF	Orestes Pérez	7 July 1947 (aged 24)		(Cuba) Granjeros
15	FW	Jorge Massó	16 February 1950 (aged 21)		(Cuba) La Habana
16	FW	José Luis Elejalde	14 January 1951 (aged 20)		(Cuba) La Habana
17	FW	Francisco Fariñas	2 April 1950 (aged 21)		(Cuba) La Habana
18	FW	José Verdecia	13 August 1944 (aged 27)		(Cuba) Mineros
19	FW	Francisco Piedra	3 December 1950 (aged 20)		(Cuba) Azucareros
20	FW	Miguel Fuentes Quiala	1949 (aged 21–22)		(Cuba) Azucareros

== Haiti ==
Head coach: Antoine Tassy

No.	Pos.	Player	Date of birth (age)	Caps	Club
1	GK	Henri Françillon	26 May 1946 (aged 25)		(Haiti) Violette
2	GK	Wilner Piquant	12 October 1949 (aged 22)	0	(Haiti) Aigle Noir
3	DF	Arsène Auguste	3 February 1951 (aged 20)	1	(Haiti) Racing Club Haïtien
4	DF	Formose Gilles	22 October 1942 (aged 29)		(Haiti) Violette
5	DF	Serge Ducosté	4 February 1944 (aged 27)		(Haiti) Aigle Noir
6	DF	Wilfried Louis	25 October 1949 (aged 22)	?	(Haiti) Don Bosco
7	DF	Wilner Nazaire	30 March 1950 (aged 21)	0	(Haiti) Racing Club Haïtien
8	DF	Claude Barthélemy	9 May 1945 (aged 26)		(Haiti) Racing Club Haïtien
9	MF	Pierre Bayonne	11 June 1949 (aged 22)	1	(Haiti) Violette
10	MF	Joseph Obas	25 May 1940 (aged 31)		(Haiti) Racing Haïtien
11	MF	Jean-Claude Désir	8 August 1946 (aged 25)		(Haiti) Aigle Noir
12	MF	Ernst Jean-Joseph	11 June 1948 (aged 23)		(Haiti) Violette
13	FW	Philippe Vorbe (captain)	14 September 1947 (aged 24)		(Haiti) Violette
14	FW	Guy François	18 September 1947 (aged 24)		(Haiti) Violette
15	FW	Emmanuel Sanon	25 June 1951 (aged 20)		(Haiti) Don Bosco
16	FW	Roger Saint-Vil	8 December 1949 (aged 21)		(Haiti) Violette
17	FW	Andre Dely	25 November 1947 (aged 23)		(Haiti) Violette
18	FW	Leintz Domingue	11 January 1945 (aged 26)		(Haiti) Racing Club Haïtien

== Honduras ==
Head coach: Carlos Suazo

No.	Pos.	Player	Date of birth (age)	Caps	Club
1	GK	Adolfo Collins	1948 (aged 23)		(Honduras) Vida
2	GK	Samuel Sentini	1948 (aged 23)		(Honduras) Olimpia
3	DF	Fernando Bulnes	21 October 1946 (aged 25)		(Honduras) Verdún
4	DF	Selvin Cárcamo	25 May 1949 (aged 22)		(Honduras) Olimpia
5	DF	Miguel Ángel Matamoros (captain)	10 May 1949 (aged 22)		(Honduras) Olimpia
6	DF	Juanín Lanza	1942 (aged 30)		(Honduras) Olimpia
7	MF	Ángel Ramón Paz	28 October 1950 (aged 21)		(Honduras) Olimpia
8	MF	José Luis Cruz	2 February 1952 (aged 19)		(Honduras) Motagua
9	MF	Arnulfo Echeverría	10 May 1950 (aged 21)		(Honduras) Marathón
10	MF	Marco Antonio Mendoza	1947 (aged 24)		(Honduras) Olimpia
11	MF	Óscar Hernández	10 June 1950 (aged 21)		(Honduras) Motagua
12	MF	Luis Bran	1947 (aged 24)		(Honduras) Atlético Indio
13	MF	Mariano Godoy	17 October 1950 (aged 21)		(Honduras) Motagua
14	FW	Rigoberto Gómez Murillo	16 December 1944 (aged 26)		(Honduras) Olimpia
15	FW	Jorge Urquía	19 September 1946 (aged 25)		(Honduras) Olimpia
16	FW	Rubén Guifarro	15 October 1946 (aged 25)		(Honduras) Motagua
17	FW	Carlos Alvarado	12 May 1949 (aged 22)		(Honduras) Vida
18	FW	Jorge Bran	1 June 1946 (aged 25)		(Honduras) Olimpia

== Mexico ==
Head coach: Javier de la Torre

No.	Pos.	Player	Date of birth (age)	Caps	Club
1	GK	Rafael Puente	5 February 1950 (aged 21)		(Mexico) Atlante
2	GK	Salvador Kuri	15 August 1945 (aged 26)		(Mexico) Laguna
3	DF	Javier Sánchez	26 November 1947 (aged 23)		(Mexico) Cruz Azul
4	DF	Genaro Bermúdez	3 September 1950 (aged 21)		(Mexico) Pumas UNAM
5	DF	Eduardo Ramos	9 November 1949 (aged 22)		(Mexico) Toluca
6	DF	Juan Manuel Chavarría	6 October 1951 (aged 20)		(Mexico) Guadalajara
7	DF	Sergio Quirarte	2 September 1949 (aged 22)		(Mexico) Atlas
8	DF	Ernesto Cervantes	2 March 1950 (aged 21)		(Mexico) Pumas UNAM
9	MF	Juan Manuel Medina	16 November 1948 (aged 23)		(Mexico) Pachuca
10	MF	Rodolfo Sotelo	17 April 1952 (aged 19)		(Mexico) Zacatepec
11	MF	Héctor González			(Mexico) Jalisco
12	MF	Rubén Cárdenas	1948 (aged 23)		(Mexico) Jalisco
13	MF	Salvador Ruiz			(Mexico) Irapuato
14	FW	Ricardo Chavarín	3 July 1951 (aged 20)		(Mexico) Atlas
15	FW	Alacrán Jiménez	5 September 1951 (aged 20)		(Mexico) Monterrey
16	FW	Octavio Muciño	14 May 1950 (aged 21)		(Mexico) Cruz Azul
17	FW	Bernardino Brambila	20 August 1950 (aged 21)		(Mexico) Puebla
18	FW	Monito Rodríguez	1 April 1946 (aged 25)		(Mexico) América
19	FW	José de Jesús Valdez	1 June 1947 (aged 24)		(Mexico) León

== Trinidad and Tobago ==
Head coach: Ken Henry

No.	Pos.	Player	Date of birth (age)	Caps	Club
1	GK	Gerald Figeroux	23 May 1943 (aged 28)		(Trinidad and Tobago) Paragon
2	GK	Tommy Rocke			(Trinidad and Tobago) Fire Service
3	GK	Mervyn Crawford			(Trinidad and Tobago) Hurricanes
4	DF	Ramon Moraldo	18 July 1951 (aged 20)		(Trinidad and Tobago) Forest Reserve
5	DF	David Arnim			(Trinidad and Tobago) Police
6	DF	Russell Tesheira	24 March 1951 (aged 20)		(Trinidad and Tobago) Malvern
7	DF	Henry Dennie			(Trinidad and Tobago) Paragon
8	DF	Victor McGill	15 August 1948 (aged 23)		(Trinidad and Tobago)
9	DF	Winston Phillips	8 February 1945 (aged 26)		(Trinidad and Tobago)
10	DF	Charlie Spooner			(Trinidad and Tobago)
11	MF	Tony Douglas	16 August 1952 (aged 19)		(Trinidad and Tobago) Point Fortin Civic
12	MF	Lyle Jeffrey			(Trinidad and Tobago) Prisons
13	MF	Oscar Durity	14 August 1950 (aged 21)		(Trinidad and Tobago) Prisons
14	MF	Mervyn Springer	20 October 1948 (aged 23)		(Trinidad and Tobago) Prisons
15	MF	Clibert Lennard			(Trinidad and Tobago)
16	MF	Clavin Lewis			(Trinidad and Tobago)
17	MF	Warren Archibald	1 August 1949 (aged 22)		(United States) Washington Darts
18	FW	Steve David	11 March 1951 (aged 20)		(Trinidad and Tobago) Police
19	FW	Wilfred Cave	23 May 1948 (aged 23)		(Trinidad and Tobago) Point Fortin Civic
20	FW	Ken Murren			(Trinidad and Tobago)
21	FW	Ulric Haynes	12 December 1948 (aged 22)		(Trinidad and Tobago) Malvern
22	FW	Aubert Phillips	13 December 1945 (aged 25)		(Trinidad and Tobago)
