= Trino Mena =

Costa Rican footballer (born 1947)

Personal information
- Full name: Trino Antonio Mena Grant
- Date of birth: 1 June 1947 (age 79)
- Place of birth: San José, San José Province, Costa Rica
- Position: Forward

Senior career*
Years	Team	Apps	(Gls)
1963–1972	Municipal Puntarenas		
1973–1975	Herediano		
1975	Barrio México		

International career
1971	Costa Rica	1	(0)
Medal record
Men's football
Representing Costa Rica
CONCACAF Championship
Bronze medal – third place	1971 Trinidad and Tobago	Team
- * Club domestic league appearances and goals

Trino Antonio Mena Grant (born 1 June 1947) is a Costa Rican retired footballer. Nicknamed "Pilila", he played as a forward for Municipal Puntarenas and Herediano throughout the 1960s and the 1970s. He also represented his native Costa Rica internationally for the 1971 CONCACAF Championship.

== Club career ==
Mena began his career within Municipal Puntarenas for the 1963 Primera División de Costa Rica, already finding himself scoring goals within the league despite only being 16 years old at the time. However, throughout his career with Puntarenas, he had been fined repeatedly for rough play. Despite this, Mena had become the top scorer for the club by the 1967 Primera División de Costa Rica with this success being repeated in subsequent seasons. During the 1973 Primera División de Costa Rica however, he switched to Herediano following the transfer window in February 1972 he remained in the club for the next two seasons. His career ended in 1975 as despite transferring to Barrio México in April, he announced his retirement by September that same year.

== International career ==
Mena was called up to represent Costa Rica for the 1971 CONCACAF Championship though his only appearance would be as a substitute player for Hernán Morales in the 0–0 draw against Haiti.
