= Carlos Bracha =

Cuban footballer (born 1949)

Personal information
- Full name: Carlos Henry Bracha
- Date of birth: 1949 (age 76–77)
- Place of birth: Banes, Holguín, Cuba
- Height: 1.85 m (6 ft 1 in)
- Position: Defender

Youth career
- 1965–1969: EIDE de Oriente-Norte

Senior career*
Years	Team	Apps	(Gls)
1970	Oriente		
1971–1983	Granjeros		

International career
1971	Cuba		
Medal record
Men's football
Representing Cuba
Pan American Games
Bronze medal – third place	Cali 1971	Team
- * Club domestic league appearances and goals

Carlos Henry Bracha (born 1949) is a retired Cuban footballer. He played as a defender for Granjeros throughout the 1970s. He also represented his native country of Cuba for the 1971 Pan American Games and the 1971 CONCACAF Championship.

== Club career ==
Bracha began his career within the EIDE de Oriente-Norte in 1965 at the Universidad de Oriente for the following 4 years as a part of a development project within his home city of Banes. He made his first major tournament debut during the third edition of the Juegos Escolares Nacionales as he would remain participating in the tournament for the next four years. He retired by 1983 as in the following season, he managed Holguín's promotion to the top-flight of Cuban football in 1984, going on to be one of the longest serving managers for the club. He has since remained active within local clubs in his home city of Banes.

== International career ==
Bracha was first called up to represent Cuba for the 1971 Pan American Games, being one of two international footballers from the province of Holguín alongside Miguel Fuentes Quiala. He made his international debut alongside Andrés Roldán, Carlos Azcuy, José Luis Elejalde, René Bonora and Miguel Rivero as Bracha contributed towards the club winning gold. He was also called up for the 1971 CONCACAF Championship a few months later where he was part of Cuba's debut in the top-stage of North American football as the Diablos Rojos ended in 4th place.
