= Víctor Calvo =

Costa Rican footballer (born 1945)

Personal information
- Full name: Víctor Gerardo Calvo Rojas
- Date of birth: 28 November 1945 (age 80)
- Place of birth: Alajuela, Alajuela Province, Costa Rica
- Position: Defender

Senior career*
Years	Team	Apps	(Gls)
1964–1973	Alajuelense		
1973–1978	Barrio México		
1974–1975	→ UES (loan)		
1978	Carmelita		

International career
1968–1971	Costa Rica	7	(0)
Medal record
Men's football
Representing Trinidad and Tobago
CONCACAF Championship
Bronze medal – third place	1971 Trinidad and Tobago	Team
- * Club domestic league appearances and goals

Víctor Gerardo Calvo Rojas (born 28 November 1945) is a Costa Rican retired footballer. Nicknamed "Palomino", he played as a defender for Alajuelense and Barrio México throughout the 1960s and the 1970s. He also represented his home country of Costa Rica internationally at the 1971 CONCACAF Championship.

== Club career ==
Calvo made his senior debut for Alajuelense during the 1964 Primera División de Costa Rica, initially finding himself within the youth sector of the club. However, he soon found himself within the reserves of the club that same year. He was characterized by his bigger and taller build compared to most other Costa Rican footballers of the era. Despite this though, he was also known for emphasizing clean play within the pitch. The 1960s saw rival club Saprissa dominate the Primera División with their only title being in the 1966 Primera División de Costa Rica. Despite this, Calvo was praised for being one of the best Alajuelense defenders around this time. The subsequent early 1970s saw Alajuelense gain more titles with the club winning the 1970 Primera División de Costa Rica with Calvo finding himself within the Starting XI by this point. He had a similar role in the following 1971 Primera División de Costa Rica where he was known for his duo defense with teammate Walter Elizondo, contributing to Alajuelense winning yet another title for the Primera División. Despite Alajuelense not achieving any further domestic titles, Calvo partook in the following 1971 CONCACAF Champions' Cup, playing in the 1–0 victory against the Rochester Lancers on 26 March 1972 with Alajuelense later achieving runners-up. The mid-1970s also saw Calvo take up the role of midfielder with the 1972 season alone seeing Calvo score a record high of 3 goals. However, he then transferred to Barrio México where he played throughout the majority of his remaining career. He also had a brief career abroad in El Salvador, playing for UES before retiring with Carmelita in 1978.

== International career ==
Calvo was first called up to represent Costa Rica at the 1969 CONCACAF Championship qualification. Despite helping Costa Rica qualify for the tournament, he failed to make the final roster. He later returned for the subsequent 1971 CONCACAF Championship where he made three appearances throughout in the matches against Cuba, Haiti and Mexico.

== Personal life ==
Calvo married María Luisa Montero in 1969 and have remained together since.
