= Rubén Cárdenas =

Mexican footballer (born 1948)

José de Jesús Valdez
Personal information
- Full name: Rubén Cárdenas Valtierra
- Date of birth: 1948 (age 77–78)
- Place of birth: Guadalajara, Jalisco, Mexico
- Position: Forward

Senior career*
Years	Team	Apps	(Gls)
1971–1972	Jalisco		
1973–1974	Puebla		
1975–1978	Guadalajara		
1978–1979	América		
1979–1982	Guadalajara		

International career
1971	Mexico	3	(0)
Medal record
Men's football
Representing Mexico
CONCACAF Championship
Gold medal – first place	1971 Trinidad and Tobago	Team
- * Club domestic league appearances and goals

Rubén Cárdenas Valtierra (born 1948) is a retired Mexican footballer. Nicknamed "Totol", he played as a attacking midfielder for Guadalajara throughout the late 1970s and early 1980s. He also represented Mexico internationally for the 1971 CONCACAF Championship.

== Club career ==
Cárdenas began his career within Jalisco and Puebla throughout the early 1970s. In 1975, he began playing for Guadalajara though the club found itself under increasing competition from Pumas UNAM and Cruz Azul as Cárdenas wouldn't win any titles throughout his tenure with Chivas. Due to financial difficulties around that same decade, he played for América for their 1978–79 season, becoming one of the few players to hold the honor of playing for both Chivas and América. He later returned to Guadalajra where he spent the remainder of his career until his retirement following the 1981–82 season.

== International career ==
Cárdenas was called up by Mexican manager Javier de la Torre to represent El Tricolor for the 1971 CONCACAF Championship. Throughout the tournament, he played in Mexico's second match against hosts Trinidad and Tobago in a secure 2–0 victory. He then played in the following victories against Cuba and Costa Rica which resulted in Mexico securing their second title in the tournament.

== Later life ==
Cárdenas later founded the Liga de fútbol Astros in 1990 which unlike most other amateur footballing leagues, only had 5 players per team and emphasizes goalscoring.
