= Salvador Kuri =

Mexican footballer (born 1945)

Personal information
- Full name: Salvador Kuri Zermeño
- Date of birth: 15 August 1945 (age 81)
- Place of birth: León, Guanajuato, Mexico
- Position: Goalkeeper

Youth career
- ???–1962: Unión de Curtidores
- 1963–1965: León

Senior career*
| Years | Team | Apps | (Gls) |
| 1965–1970 | Torreón | | |
| 1970–1972 | Laguna | | |
| 1972–1974 | Toluca | | |
| 1974–1976 | Guadalajara | | |
| 1976–1978 | León | | |
| 1978–1980 | Atlético Potosino | | |

International career
| 1971 | Mexico | 0 | (0) |
Medal record
Men's football
Representing Mexico
CONCACAF Championship
| Gold medal – first place | 1971 Trinidad and Tobago | Team |
- * Club domestic league appearances and goals

Salvador Kuri Zermeño (born 15 August 1945) is a retired Mexican footballer. He served as the goalkeeper for Torreón, Toluca, Guadalajara and León throughout the 1970s. He also represented Mexico for the 1971 CONCACAF Championship.

== Club career ==
Kuri was born on 15 August 1945 to shoemaker Antonio Kuri who was of Lebanese descent and into a family of nine. He began his footballing career within the A.B Nacional league throughout his youth and soon found himself playing for the youth sector of Unión de Curtidores. However, his talents caught the interest of León assistant coach Agustín "El Peterete" Santillán and was signed to the club at the age of 16. Despite initially possibly being the reserve goalkeeper for Antonio Carbajal due to the latter being called up for the upcoming 1966 FIFA World Cup. However, with the arrival of Luis Grill Prieto and him bringing in goalkeepers Juan Antonio Muñoz and Darío Miranda, chances for Kuri to debut in the senior team were getting increasingly slim. Discouraged, Kuri initially returned to work at a shoe factory for four months. However, Torreón manager Federico Sagiante at the recommendation of club owner Agustín "El Peterete" Santillán who had sought to reinforce the goalkeeping composition of the club which consisted of Luis Garza Septién and José Ledezma. He arrived on a Wednesday and serving as a reserve goalkeeper in the following home match against Puebla on a Sunday at the Estadio de la Revolución where Peruvian coach Grimaldo González also made his managerial debut but had ended in a 2–0 defeat for the club. Thus, Kuri became the new starting goalkeeper in a couple of matches to consistently better results. Thus, the following 1966–67 Mexican Segunda División saw Septién and Ledezma replaced with Raúl "Güero" Navarro and René Vizcaíno who would form the main goalkeeping trio for the remainder of the 1960s and the early 1970s. The 1968–69 Mexican Segunda División was the most successful of Kuri's career with Torreón as he was part of the squad that helped the club achieve promotion to the top-flight of Mexican football as well as winning that season's Copa de la Segunda División de México.

He transferred to Laguna for the 1970–71 season where he remained for an additional season until he transferred to Toluca for an additional two seasons. However, he then signed with Guadalajara for their 1974–75 season after their main goalkeeper Ignacio Calderón had left for Leones Negros UdEG. He achieved his lifelong dream of playing for the Esmeraldas as he then played for León for their 1976–77 season under Uruguayan manager Roberto Scarone for the following two seasons. He spent his final years with Atlético Potosino until his retirement following the 1979–80 season under Grill Prieto once more.

== International career ==
Kuri was initially called up in Mexico's preliminary roster for the 1970 FIFA World Cup. However, a month and a half before the tournament started, he was removed from the roster by Antonio Carbajal who was still El Tricolor's goalkeeping coach. He received his biggest international appearance during the 1971 CONCACAF Championship under manager Javier de la Torre where he served as the reserve goalkeeper for Rafael Puente. He was also called up for the 1973 CONCACAF Championship qualifiers as a reserve but never made any appearances.

== Later life ==
Kuri has been considered one of the most important players in Laguna's history to where a plaque was dedicated to him and several other notable players in 2019.
