= Luis Fernando Solano =

Costa Rican footballer (born 1945)

Personal information
- Full name: Luis Fernando Solano Vega
- Date of birth: 21 September 1945 (age 81)
- Place of birth: San José, San José Province, Costa Rica
- Position: Right-back

Senior career*
Years	Team	Apps	(Gls)
1965–1976	Saprissa		
1977–1978	Cartaginés		

International career
1969–1972	Costa Rica	17	(0)
Medal record
Men's football
Representing Costa Rica
CONCACAF Championship
Bronze medal – third place	1971 Trinidad and Tobago	Team
- * Club domestic league appearances and goals

Luis Fernando Solano Vega (born 21 September 1945) is a Costa Rican retired footballer. He played for Saprissa and Cartaginés throughout the 1960s and the 1970s. He also represented Costa Rica for the 1969 and 1971 CONCACAF Championship.

== Club career ==
Finding himself within the youth sector, Solano made his senior debut for Saprissa within the 1965 Primera División de Costa Rica as he was part of the winning squad that season even if his debut season also saw him get fined 25.00 colón for rough play. This success continued into the rest of the decade as he won the 1967, 1968 and 1969 Primera División de Costa Rica. The 1968 season also saw Solano gradually make more appearances within Saprissa including appearing in a friendly against Honduran club Atlético Indio. This success continued into the 1970s as Saprissa dominated the Primera División as starting in the 1972 Campeonato de Fútbol de Costa Rica, Saprissa dominated the Primera División throughout the decade. The 1972 season also saw Solano partake in a friendly against Brazilian club Santos where he notably played against Pelé with that season also seeing Solano be part of the winning squad of the 1972 Copa Juan Santamaría. Prior to Saprissa's first success in the 1970s, the 1971 season saw Solano cement himself as a right-back with Saprissa narrowly missing the title that season.

He then played for Cartaginés for the 1977 Primera División de Costa Rica with the club ending as runners-up. However, his switch to Cartaginés saw significantly less appearances due both to his age as well as internal management issues within Cartaginés and retired following the 1978 Primera División de Costa Rica.

== International career ==
Solano was first called up for the 1969 CONCACAF Championship in where Costa Rica had been selected as hosts. He made his international debut in the 3–0 victory over Jamaica. Throughout the tournament, he made 3 more appearances, all being victories against Netherlands Antilles, Mexico and Trinidad and Tobago. In the following 1971 CONCACAF Championship however, he made less appearances as his only two appearances were 1–0 and 1–3 defeats against Mexico and Trinidad and Tobago respectively. His final international appearances came during the 1973 CONCACAF Championship qualifiers where Costa Rica narrowly failed to qualify for the 1973 CONCACAF Championship as they lost in point difference to Honduras.
