= Bonora =

Bonora is a surname. Notable people with the surname include:

- Alessandra Bonora (born 2000), Italian sprinter
- Alessandro Bonora (born 1978), Italian cricketer
- Camille Bonora (born 1956), American Muppet performer
- Davide Bonora (born 1973), Italian basketball player
- Georgia Bonora, Australian gymnast
- René Bonora (1951–2025), Cuban footballer
