= Quirarte =

Quirarte is a surname. Notable people with the surname include:

- Fernando Quirarte (born 1956), Mexican footballer and manager
- Jacinto Quirarte (1931–2012), American art historian, professor, scholar, and writer
- Sergio Quirarte (born 1949), Mexican footballer
- Vicente Quirarte (1954–2026), Mexican academic and writer
