= Juan Manuel Medina =

Mexican footballer (1948–1973)

Personal information
- Full name: Juan Manuel Medina Guzmán
- Date of birth: 16 November 1948
- Place of birth: Mexico City, Mexico
- Date of death: 29 March 1973 (aged 24)
- Place of death: Mexico
- Position: Midfielder

Youth career
- 1962–1966: Zacatepec

Senior career*
Years	Team	Apps	(Gls)
1968–1972	Pachuca		
1972–1973	Cruz Azul		

International career
1971–1972	Mexico	18	(0)
Medal record
Men's football
Representing Mexico
CONCACAF Championship
Gold medal – first place	1971 Trinidad and Tobago	Team
- * Club domestic league appearances and goals

Juan Manuel Medina Guzmán (16 November 1948 – 29 March 1973) was a Mexican footballer. Nicknamed "Gato", he played as a midfielder for Pachuca and Cruz Azul throughout the early 1970s. He also represented Mexico for the 1971 CONCACAF Championship.

== Club career ==
Medina made his senior debut for Pachuca during the 1968–69 Mexican Primera División where the club achieved a mediocre 10th place finish. Despite the rough start, Medina proved himself to be one of Pachuca's best players where he helped save the club from relegation during the 1970–71 Mexican Primera División during the first relegation playoff match against Atlas. His talents with the Pecos caused Cruz Azul to catch interest in the 23-year-old midfielder to sign him for their 1972–73 season. Despite the Máquina Celeste golden generation continuing their streak of success throughout the early 1970s, unfortunately, Medina wouldn't live to see the end of the season as he had been involved in a fatal car accident on 29 March 1973 whilst returning from a baptism in Pachuca to his native Mexico City.

== International career ==
Medina was first called up by Mexico coach Javier de la Torre in a friendly against the Soviet Union which ended in a 0–0 draw, becoming the first player playing in Pachuca to represent El Tricolor internationally. His biggest international contribution came through representing Mexico for the 1971 CONCACAF Championship. Throughout the tournament, he made perfect attendance for all of Mexico's five games, being part of the winning Mexican squad for the tournament as well as being part of the Team of the Tournament. His final international appearance came in a 3–1 victory over Costa Rica on 12 October 1972.

== Personal life ==
Prior to his untimely death, Medina was married and had two children. He was also a practicing Roman Catholic.
