= Sergio Quirarte =

Mexican footballer (born 1949)

Personal information
- Full name: Sergio Alberto Quirarte Rodríguez
- Date of birth: 2 September 1949 (age 77)
- Place of birth: Guadalajara, Jalisco, Mexico
- Position: Forward

Youth career
- ???–1968: Guadalajara

Senior career*
| Years | Team | Apps | (Gls) |
| 1968–1973 | Atlas | | |
| 1973–1978 | Tecos | | |

International career
| 1971–1972 | Mexico | 4 | (0) |
Medal record
Men's football
Representing Mexico
CONCACAF Championship
| Gold medal – first place | 1971 Trinidad and Tobago | Team |
- * Club domestic league appearances and goals

Sergio Alberto Quirarte Rodríguez (born 2 September 1949) is a retired Mexican footballer. He played for Atlas and Tecos throughout the 1970s, primarily playing in the Segunda Division and helping both clubs be promoted to the top-flight of Mexican football. He also represented Mexico internationally for the 1971 CONCACAF Championship.

== Club career ==
Quirarte began his career within his native city within the youth sector of Guadalajara. Despite training under Chivas, he made his senior debut for Atlas for the 1968–69 Mexican Primera División where the club achieved an average performance of 6th place. His greatest accomplishment with the club came during the 1971–72 Mexican Segunda División where following the club's relegation the previous season, he contributed towards their return for the 1972–73 Mexican Primera División. However, he began playing for Tecos in the 1973–74 Mexican Segunda División and helped achieve their own promotion in the following 1974–75 Mexican Segunda División. He played for the following three seasons until he retired following their 1977–78 season.

== International career ==
Quirarte was called up by manager Javier de la Torre to represent Mexico for the 1971 CONCACAF Championship. He made his international debut during the 2–0 victory over hosts Trinidad and Tobago. His other three appearances throughout the tournament were in the victories against Cuba, Honduras and Costa Rica with El Tricolor winning their second title in the tournament.

== Later life ==
Following his retirement, he continued to be active within Tecos, serving as their accountant for the past 30 years. He has also served as a coach for the youth sector of Tecos at the Universidad Autónoma de Guadalajara.
