= Juan Manuel Chavarría =

Mexican footballer (born 1951)

Rodolfo Sotelo
Personal information
- Full name: Juan Manuel Chavarría Zavala
- Date of birth: 6 October 1951 (age 75)
- Place of birth: Francisco I. Madero, Coahuila, Mexico
- Position: Defender

Senior career*
Years	Team	Apps	(Gls)
1968–1971	Torreón		
1971–1976	Guadalajara		
1976–1983	Tecos		

International career
1971–1972	Mexico	12	(0)
Medal record
Men's football
Representing Mexico
CONCACAF Championship
Gold medal – first place	1971 Trinidad and Tobago	Team
- * Club domestic league appearances and goals

Juan Manuel Chavarría Zavala (born 5 October 1951) is a retired Mexican footballer. Nicknamed "El Coruña", he played as a defender for Guadalajara and Tecos throughout the 1970s. He also represented Mexico internationally for the 1971 CONCACAF Championship.

== Club career ==
Chavarría made his senior debut for Torreón during the 1968–69 Mexican Primera División. His career with the club continued into the early 1970s where he remained until the 1970–71 season. The following season saw Guadalajara take interest in the young defender as they were looking for a replacement for José Villegas who had just retired the previous season. Thus, Chavarría made his debut during the 1971–72 season, being one of the most expensive transfers in Mexican football at the time. Following a few seasons with Chivas, alongside his former Torreón teammate Víctor Elizalde, played for Tecos, notably playing 20 consecutive matches without losing at some point in his tenure with the club until his retirement following the 1982–83 Mexican Primera División.

== International career ==
Chavarría was first called up to represent El Tricolor in a home friendly match against Greece on 6 July 1971 which ended in a 1–1 draw. He made his biggest contribution during the 1971 CONCACAF Championship where he played in the draw against Haiti and the 2–1 victory over Honduras as he contributed towards the club's victory in the tournament. His final international appearance came during the 1973 CONCACAF Championship qualifiers in the away match against the United States in a 1–2 victory on 10 September 1972 though he wasn't called up for the final tournament.
