= Bernardino Brambila =

Mexican footballer (born 1946)

Personal information
- Full name: Bernardino Brambila Moya
- Date of birth: 20 August 1950
- Place of birth: San Marcos, Jalisco, Mexico
- Date of death: 14 May 2011 (aged 60)
- Place of death: Teziutlán, Puebla, Mexico
- Position: Forward

Youth career
- 1962–1966: Zacatepec

Senior career*
Years	Team	Apps	(Gls)
1968–1970	Oro		
1970–1971	Jalisco		
1971–1974	Puebla		
1974–1975	Atlético Español		
1975–1976	Puebla		

International career
1971–1973	Mexico	2	(0)
Medal record
Men's football
Representing Mexico
CONCACAF Championship
Gold medal – first place	1971 Trinidad and Tobago	Team
- * Club domestic league appearances and goals

Bernardino Brambila Moya (20 August 1950 – 14 May 2011) was a Mexican football player and manager. He primarily played for Puebla and Jalisco throughout the early 1970s as a forward. He also represented Mexico internationally for the 1971 CONCACAF Championship.

== Club career ==
Brambila began his professional career with Oro, for whom he made an important contribution to relegation in his first season in the 1968–69 Mexican Primera División. During the relegation playoffs against Nuevo León, he scored the important goal in the second match to make it 2-1 and in the all-important third game, scored the winning goal for a 1-0 victory in the 89th minute, securing his club's stay in the top-flight of Mexican football. He remained with the club when they rebranded as Jalisco, staying until the 1970–71 Mexican Primera División as he transferred to Puebla which had been relatively recently promoted. He briefly played for Atlético Español in the 1974–75 Mexican Primera División before returning to Puebla for their 1975–76 season before retiring.

== International career ==
Despite being called up for the 1971 CONCACAF Championship, he made no appearances in the tournament, only appearing as a reserve player. However, he later made his international debut in a 3–1 victory over Costa Rica on 12 October 1972. His second and final appearance was on another friendly against Chile on 20 September 1973.

== Career as a manager ==
Brambila first served as a manager for his former club of Puebla during their 1995–96 season. However, he only served as manager for the first 10 games as due to poor match results, he was sacked and replaced with Hugo Fernández. He later served as manager for Zacatlán from 2007 to 2010.
