= Rodolfo Sotelo =

Mexican footballer (born 1952)

Personal information
- Full name: Rodolfo Sotelo Esparza
- Date of birth: 17 April 1952 (age 74)
- Place of birth: Mexico City, Mexico
- Position: Midfielder

Youth career
- ???–1969: Huracán Sevilla

Senior career*
Years	Team	Apps	(Gls)
1969–1985	Zacatepec	217	(5)

International career
1971	Mexico	2	(0)
Medal record
Men's football
Representing Mexico
CONCACAF Championship
Gold medal – first place	1971 Trinidad and Tobago	Team
- * Club domestic league appearances and goals

Rodolfo Sotelo Esparza (born 17 April 1952) is a retired Mexican footballer. Nicknamed "Triquis", he played as a midfielder for Zacatepec throughout his entire career spanning from the early 1970s to the mid 1980s. He also represented Mexico internationally for the 1971 CONCACAF Championship.

== Club career ==
Sotelo began his career within Huracán Sevilla during the late 1960s which was a youth amateur club within Mexico City. He then began playing for Zacatepec for the 1969–70 Mexican Segunda División with his older brother Rito Sotelo already having been playing in the club for many seasons by that point. Under manager Fernando Dávila Roldán, the club won the tournament and achieved their promotion to the top-flight of Mexican football. Throughout the 1970s, he formed the main midfield composition alongside Felipe Ocampo and Alejandro Tafolla with his top-flight debut occurring on the final matchday of the 1971–72 Mexican Primera División where it ended in a 2–0 victory with Sotelo scoring a goal in the 16th minute. He continued playing throughout the rest of the decade with a brief break in 1976 following a leg injury. However, following Zacatepec's relegation following the 1976–77 Mexican Primera División, the club underwent a major restructuring in the following 1977–78 Mexican Segunda División with many youth players signed and the team ultimately returning to the top-flight of Mexican football the following season. 1978 also saw Sotelo take part in the club's tour of China, playing a series of friendlies against Liaoning, Bayi and Wuhan. He would help the club achieve promotion once more in the 1983–84 Mexican Segunda División before retiring in the following season.

== International career ==
Sotelo briefly represented Mexico for the 1971 CONCACAF Championship. Throughout the tournament, he made his first appearance in the 0–0 draw against Haiti's opening match. His second and final international appearance was in the 2–1 victory against Honduras on 4 December 1971.

== Later life ==
Since 1989, Sotelo has remained involved in the operations of his former club of Zacatepec as a shareholder.
