= Victor McGill =

Trinidadian footballer (born 1948)

Personal information
- Full name: Victor McGill
- Date of birth: 15 August 1948 (age 78)
- Place of birth: Belmont, Port of Spain Trinidad and Tobago
- Height: 1.78 m (5 ft 10 in)
- Position: Defender

Youth career
- Belmont Secondary

Senior career*
Years	Team	Apps	(Gls)
- Essex
c. 1971	Cipriani United		
1969–1979	Belmont Colts		

International career
1971–1972	Trinidad and Tobago	3	(0)
- * Club domestic league appearances and goals

Victor McGill (born 15 August 1948) is a retired Trinidadian footballer. Nicknamed "Bigger", he played as a defender for Cipriani United and the Belmont Colts throughout the 1970s. He also represented his native Trinidad and Tobago for the 1971 CONCACAF Championship.

== Club career ==
Following his graduation from Belmont Secondary School, McGill initially worked as a schoolteacher but he soon caught the attention of Cipriani United who signed him for the club after a major disciplinary restructuring within. Throughout his career, he earned many titles within the Morvant league including being named Most Valuable Player at some point. He continued to play for the club after they officially joined the Eddie Hart Football League in 1971 with the club winning in their very debut. He soon returned to his home city to play for the Belmont Colts after manager Dennis Yhip had taken interest in McGill, finding himself playing in the Port of Spain First League as early as 1969. He remained in the club with his final season being in 1979, defeating Glory Guys in the final. After moving to Canada in 1982, he played in various amateur clubs throughout the 1980s.

== International career ==
McGill made his debut during the 1971 CONCACAF Championship in the 3–1 against title-holders Costa Rica. The majority of his international career however was spent during the subsequent 1973 CONCACAF Championship qualifiers, playing in both the home and away matches against Suriname. Despite the Soca Warriors qualifying for the tournament, McGill was not named in the final squad.

== Personal life ==
Victor is the brother of Aldwyn McGill who dedicated a book of Victor and his teammates' international careers as well as the history of Trinidadian football spanning from the 1960s to the present. He also helped his brother re-establish the Morvant Primary School Football in 2024.
