= José Manuel Rojas (footballer, born 1952) =

Costa Rican footballer

Personal information
- Full name: José Manuel Rojas Ramírez
- Date of birth: June 8, 1952 (age 74)
- Place of birth: San José, Costa Rica
- Position: Midfielder

Senior career*
Years	Team	Apps	(Gls)
1972–1976	Deportivo Mexico		
- Deportivo Galicia
- Saprissa
- Limonense

International career
- Costa Rica
- * Club domestic league appearances and goals

José Manuel Rojas Ramírez (born 8 June 1952), is a retired football player from Costa Rica.

Better known as Chinimba, he played most of his career for Deportivo Saprissa, where he is still remembered as an idol.

== Club career ==
He started his football career playing for Deportivo México, and was later transferred to Saprissa. "Chinimba" is vastly recalled for his great shooting skills, his excellent passing abilities, and quickness of mind. Overall, he was a midfielder, with extraordinary talent, and was part of the famous Saprissa's midfield whose way of playing made history in the CONCACAF region, winning several titles with them. He was part of the mythical Saprissa squad that won six consecutive championships from 1972 to 1977, a record both in Costa Rica as well as in the Americas. He also played for Limonense.

== International career ==
He played during the 70's with Costa Rica's national team.

== Personal life ==
"Chinimba" had some troubles with the law in his country, and was sentenced to 64 months in prison during the 1980s, which cut his brilliant soccer future short. During his time spent in prison, he studied and achieved his degree, and has dedicated a big part of his life in teaching inside several prison facilities in his country. He later worked as a TV pundit.
