= Vicente Quirarte =

Mexican writer (1954–2026)

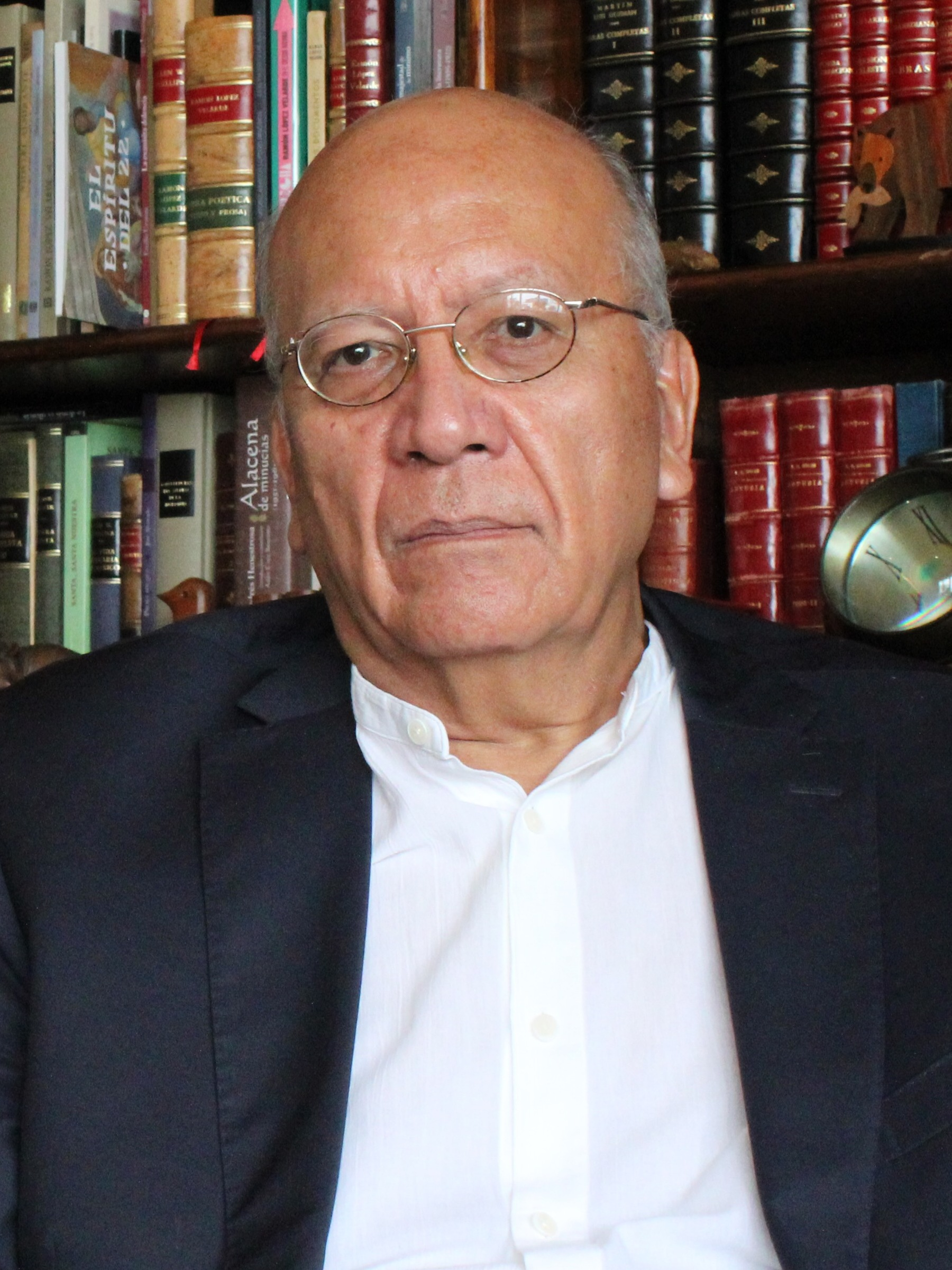
- Quirarte in 2024
- Born: Vicente Quirarte Castañeda; 19 July 1954; Centro, Federal District, Mexico
- Died: 11 August 2026 (aged 72); Mexico City, Mexico
- Education: UNAM
- Occupations: Writer and academic
- Writing career
- Genres: Essay, verse, theatre
- Notable work: El ángel es vampiro
- Notable awards: Xavier Villaurrutia Prize (1991); National Prize for Arts and Sciences (2024)

Vicente Quirarte Castañeda (Note: In this Mexican name, the surname is Quirarte and the second or maternal family name is Castañeda.) (19 July 1954 – 11 August 2026) was a Mexican academic and writer whose work includes poetry, theatre, and essays. He was a member of both the Colegio Nacional and the Mexican Academy of Language.

== Life and career ==
Quirarte was born in the historic centre of Mexico City on 19 July 1954. He earned a bachelor's degree (1982) in Spanish language and literature, and a master's degree (1989) and doctorate (1998) in Mexican literature, all from the National Autonomous University of Mexico (UNAM), where he also taught and conducted research. He was admitted to the Mexican Academy of Language in 2003 and to the Colegio Nacional in 2016. He also served as the director of the National Library of Mexico from 2004 to 2008.

In 1991 he was awarded the Xavier Villaurrutia Prize for the verse collection El ángel es vampiro and in 2024 the National Prize for Arts and Sciences in the Linguistics and Literature category.

Quirarte died in Mexico City on 11 August 2026, at the age of 72.
