= Winston Phillips =

Trinidadian footballer (born 1945)

Personal information
- Full name: Winston Charles Phillips
- Date of birth: 8 February 1945 (age 81)
- Place of birth: Woodbrook, Port of Spain, Trinidad and Tobago
- Height: 1.73 m (5 ft 8 in)
- Position: Defender

Youth career
- Tranquillity Boys Intermediate

Senior career*
Years	Team	Apps	(Gls)
- Defence Force
c. 1985	Paragon		

International career
1971–1985	Trinidad and Tobago	14	(0)
Medal record
Men's football
Representing Trinidad and Tobago
CONCACAF Championship
Silver medal – second place	1973 Haiti	Team
- * Club domestic league appearances and goals

Winston Charles Phillips (born 8 February 1945) is a retired Trinidadian footballer. Nicknamed "Bee", he played as a defender for Defence Force and Paragon throughout the early 1970s. He also represented his native Trinidad and Tobago for the 1971, 1973 and 1985 CONCACAF Championships.

== International career ==
Phillips was first called up for the 1971 CONCACAF Championship in the 2–0 loss against Mexico. He remained in the Starting XI for the following 1973 CONCACAF Championship where the Soca Warriors nearly qualified for the 1974 FIFA World Cup. Despite his age by the mid-1980s, he made 4 appearances in the 1985 CONCACAF Championship where his final appearance was in the 1-0 loss against the United States.

== Personal life ==
Philips' daughter, Laura Ann later became a correspondent for Catholic News. He also remains active in supporting the Soca Warriors, spectating their long-awaited debut in the 2006 FIFA World Cup. He is also brothers with Lincoln Phillips and Aubert Phillips, both of whom are also internationals for Trinidad.

== Honours ==
Trinidad and Tobago

- CONCACAF Championship : Runner-up, 1973
