= Aubert Phillips =

Trinidadian footballer (1950–2012)

Personal information
- Full name: George Suitbert Romano
- Date of birth: 13 December 1945
- Place of birth: Tunapuna, Tunapuna–Piarco, Trinidad and Tobago
- Date of death: 9 August 2024 (aged 74)
- Place of death: Arima, Trinidad and Tobago
- Position: Forward

Senior career*
Years	Team	Apps	(Gls)
c. 1970–1972	Prisons		

International career
1971	Trinidad and Tobago	4	(2)
- * Club domestic league appearances and goals

Aubert Lester Phillips (13 December 1945 – 9 August 2024) was a retired Trinidadian footballer. Nicknamed "Nobbie", he forward for Prisons throughout the early 1970s. He also represented Trinidad and Tobago for the 1971 CONCACAF Championship.

== International career ==
Phillips was called up to represent Trinidad and Tobago for the 1971 CONCACAF Championship. His debut appearance was in a 1–1 draw against Honduras on 21 November 1971. His greatest performance came during the match against titleholders Costa Rica on 5 December 1971 where he scored two goals in the 3–2 victory.

== Personal life ==
Aubert is brothers with Lincoln and Winston Phillips, both of whom also represented Trinidad internationally. He later died on 9 August 2024 at his home in Arima.
