= Adolfo Collins =

Honduran footballer (1948–2023)

Personal information
- Full name: Gustavo Adolfo Collins Bodden
- Date of birth: 1948
- Place of birth: La Ceiba, Atlántida, Honduras
- Date of death: 30 December 2023 (aged 74–75)
- Place of death: Honduras
- Position: Goalkeeper

Senior career*
Years	Team	Apps	(Gls)
1966–1984	Vida		

International career
1971–1973	Honduras		
- * Club domestic league appearances and goals

Gustavo Adolfo Collins Bodden (1948 – 30 December 2023) was a Honduran footballer. Nicknamed "Gorcha", he played as a goalkeeper for Vida throughout his entire career across the late 1960s through the early 1980s. He also represented Honduras internationally for the 1971 CONCACAF Championship.

== Club career ==
Collins made his debut during the 1966–67 Honduran Liga Nacional with Vida with the tournament ending in a moderate third place. This period of normality would continue throughout the remainder of the decade and into the 1970s as the club continuously narrowly missed receiving the national title. This would begin to change around the 1980s as Collins was part of the winning squad for the 1981–82 Honduran Liga Nacional with the club receiving another award in Collins' final season through the 1983–84 Honduran Liga Nacional.

== International career ==
Collins was first called up to represent Honduras as its main goalkeeper and led the campaign for the Catrachos to successfully qualify for the 1971 CONCACAF Championship. His final international appearances came through the 1973 CONCACAF Championship qualification with his most notable appearance being through the 3–3 draw against Costa Rica but would not appear in the final tournament.

== Personal life ==
Following his retirement, he opened up a bar-restaurant within his home city of La Ceiba.

At some point throughout the late 2010s, Collins was diagnosed with diabetes and had been fighting a long battle against the illness. His former club of Vida would later produce a commemorative shirt in tribute for him in 2021.

Collins died on 30 December 2023 following a long battle with kidney complications.
