= Mervyn Springer =

Trinidadian footballer (born 1948)

Personal information
- Full name: Mervyn Jimmy Springer
- Date of birth: 20 October 1948
- Place of birth: Tunapuna, Tunapuna–Piarco, Trinidad and Tobago
- Date of death: 28 January 2016 (aged 67)
- Place of death: East Orange, New Jersey, U.S.
- Position: Midfielder

Youth career
- Queen's Royal College

Senior career*
Years	Team	Apps	(Gls)
- Prisons

International career
1969–1971	Trinidad and Tobago	3	(0)
- * Club domestic league appearances and goals

Mervyn Jimmy Springer (20 October 1948 – 28 January 2016) was a Trinidadian footballer. He played as a midfielder for Prisons throughout his career in the late 1960s and early 1970s. He also represented Trinidad and Tobago for the 1969 and 1971 CONCACAF Championship.

== International career ==
Springer made his international debut during the 1969 CONCACAF Championship in the match against Guatemala on 27 November 1969 which would end in a 2–0 defeat. His further two appearances against Netherlands Antilles and Mexico would also end in defeat, putting Trinidad and Tobago in 5th place in the tournament. He was also called up for the subsequent 1971 CONCACAF Championship but made no appearances throughout the tournament.

== Later life ==
Springer later had a daughter named Nicole and lived in East Orange, New Jersey until his death on 20 January 2016.
