= Eduardo de la Torre =

Mexican footballer and manager (born 1962)

Personal information
- Full name: Eduardo de la Torre Menchaca
- Date of birth: 4 December 1962 (age 63)
- Place of birth: Guadalajara, Mexico
- Position: Forward

Senior career*
Years	Team	Apps	(Gls)
1977–1987	Guadalajara	99	(62)
1988	Xerez CD	1	(0)
1988–1992	Guadalajara	120	(29)
1992–1993	Querétaro	24	(2)

International career
1984–1988	Mexico	14	(9)

Managerial career
- 1999: Santos Laguna (assistant)
- 2000: León (assistant)
- 2000–2002: Santos Laguna (assistant)
- 2002–2004: Guadalajara
- 2004–2005: Santos Laguna
- 2006–2007: Chiapas
- 2009–2010: Chiapas (assistant)
- 2010–2013: Mexico (assistant)
- 2014: Morelia
- * Club domestic league appearances and goals

Eduardo "Yayo" de la Torre Menchaca (born 4 December 1962) is a Mexican former football player and manager. He is currently employed by Fox Sports Mexico as a football analyst.

== Career ==
De la Torre was born on 4 December 1962 in Guadalajara, Jalisco. He is the son of Javier De la Torre, the distinguished former coach of the Campeonísimo team of the 1960s. Emerging from Guadalajara’s youth academy in the late 1970s, he was part of a notable generation of players.

He played a decisive role in Guadalajara’s 1986–87 championship campaign, scoring twice in the final against Cruz Azul to secure the club’s ninth Mexican league title. His cousins, José Manuel and Néstor, were also members of the squad.

In 1988, he returned to Chivas following a brief period with Xerez in Spain. Although his second tenure with the club did not yield the same level of productivity that supporters had come to expect, he maintained a competitive standard. He departed in 1992, ranking as the third-highest scorer in the club’s history.

He concluded his professional career with Querétaro, where he played one final season before retiring in 1993.

Following his retirement, De la Torre remained involved in football as both a coach and sporting director. He went on to manage Guadalajara, Correcaminos, Santos Laguna, Chiapas, and Monarcas Morelia. In addition, he served as sporting director for Cruz Azul and Necaxa.
