= Luis Bran (Honduran footballer) =

Honduran footballer (born 1947)

Jorge Bran
Personal information
- Full name: Luis Bran Guevara
- Date of birth: 1947 (age 78–79)
- Place of birth: Comayagüela, Francisco Morazán, Honduras
- Position: Midfielder

Senior career*
| Years | Team | Apps | (Gls) |
| 1965–1974 | Atlético Indio | | |
| 1974–1977 | Olimpia | | |

International career
| 1971 | Honduras | 2 | (0) |
- * Club domestic league appearances and goals

Luis Bran Guevara (born 1947) is a retired Honduran footballer. He played as a midfielder for Atlético Indio and Olimpia throughout the 1970s. He also represented Honduras for the 1971 CONCACAF Championship.

== Club career ==
Luis was born into a family of athletes with his younger brothers Jorge and Pilín Bran also becoming footballers. Luis made his debut during the inaugural 1965–66 Honduran Liga Nacional for Atlético Indio. He remained with the club into the early 1970s until he was transferred to Olimpia for the 1974–75 Honduran Liga Nacional where he had the chance to play alongside his two brothers until his retirement following the 1976–77 Honduran Liga Nacional.

== International career ==
Bran was called up to represent Honduras for the 1971 CONCACAF Championship. During the tournament, he made two appearances in the matches against Cuba and Haiti.
