= Juanín Lanza =

Honduran footballer (born 1942)

Personal information
- Full name: Juan Isidro Lanza
- Date of birth: 1942 (age 83–84)
- Place of birth: Tegucigalpa, Francisco Morazán, Honduras
- Position: Defender

Senior career*
Years	Team	Apps	(Gls)
1966–1974	Olimpia		

International career
1969–1973	Honduras	3	(0)
- * Club domestic league appearances and goals

Juan Isidro Lanza (born 1942) is a retired Honduran footballer. Nicknamed "Juanín", he played for Olimpia throughout the late 1960s and early 1970s, winning several titles with the club. He also represented Honduras for the 1971 CONCACAF Championship.

== Club career ==
Growing up as an energetic child, Lanza began his career within the Instituto Central Vicente Cáceres. Despite initially being interested in football, he took up a career in basketball, playing for Club Colombia from 1963 to 1965 until a hand injury in the latter season caused him to retire prematurely. He then returned to football beginning in the 1966–67 Honduran Liga Nacional where the club won their first national title with this success being repeated in the 1967–68 Honduran Liga Nacional. His career highlights came during the 1970s as he was part of the winning squad for the 1969–70 and 1971–72 Honduran Liga Nacional. He also won the 1972 CONCACAF Champions' Cup and the 1973 Copa Interamericana. He retired at the age of 31 after his teammate Miguel Ángel Matamoros left the club to play abroad for Spain as he often played with him the most.

== International career ==
Lanza was first called up to play in the 1971 CONCACAF Championship. He also participated in the 1973 CONCACAF Championship qualification games against Costa Rica but wouldn't end in the final roster.

== Later life ==
Lanza later partook in taekwondo under the tutorage of Bong Kyung Song where he later received a black belt and would continue for the following years. He ended his career through his career with softball and played for Aviación, Escuela Militar de Aviación, Curacao and Rebeldes.
