= Lorenzo Sotomayor (footballer) =

Cuban footballer (born 1949)

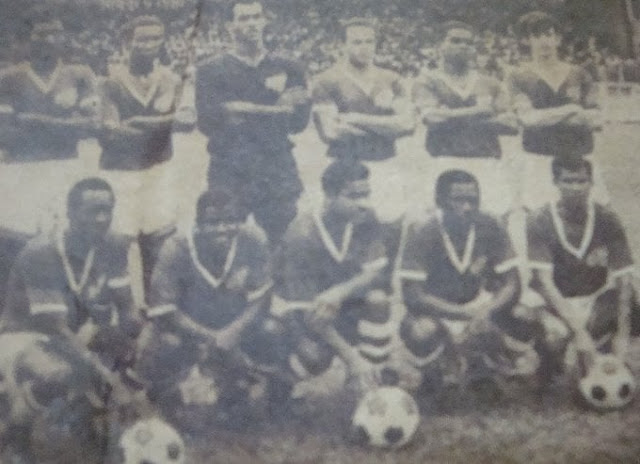
- Cuba at the 1971 Pan American Games. Sotomayor is in the first row.

Personal information
- Full name: Lorenzo Sotomayor Fernández
- Date of birth: 2 February 1949 (age 77)
- Place of birth: Najasa, Camagüey, Cuba
- Position: Defender

Senior career*
| Years | Team | Apps | (Gls) |
| 1969–1977 | Granjeros | | |

International career
| 1970–1977 | Cuba | | (0) |
Medal record
Men's football
Representing Cuba
Central American and Caribbean Games
| Gold medal – first place | Panama 1970 | Team |
Pan American Games
| Bronze medal – third place | Cali 1971 | Team |
- * Club domestic league appearances and goals

Lorenzo Sotomayor Fernández (born 2 February 1949) is a retired Cuban footballer. He played as a defender for Granjeros throughout the 1970s. He also represented his home country of Cuba in various tournaments including the 1976 Summer Olympics.

== Club career ==
Sotomayor played for Granjeros from 1969 to 1977. He was a part of a football dynasty for the club as he would oversee the club win the 1969, 1970, 1975 and the 1977 Campeonato Nacional de Fútbol de Cuba with his first and last seasons being winning seasons.

== International career ==
Argüelles was first called up to represent Cuba for the 1970 Central American and Caribbean Games held at Panama as a substitute as the club would end up winning the tournament. He later played at the 1971 Pan American Games where the club reached third place. He then represented Cuba at the 1976 Summer Olympics where the club would be eliminated in the group stage. He made his final international appearance against Jamaica during the 1977 CONCACAF Championship qualifiers on 26 August 1976 as the team won 2–0.
