= Antonio Garcés =

Cuban footballer

Personal information
- Full name: Antonio Garcés Segura
- Date of birth: 2 September 1950 (age 76)
- Place of birth: Vertientes, Cuba
- Height: 1.98 m (6 ft 6 in)
- Position: Defender

Senior career*
Years	Team	Apps	(Gls)
- Granjeros

International career
1971–1976	Cuba		
- * Club domestic league appearances and goals

Antonio Garcés Segura (born 2 September 1950) is a Cuban former footballer who competed in the 1976 Summer Olympics.

== International career ==
He represented his country in 3 FIFA World Cup qualifying matches and played two games at the 1976 Summer Olympics.
