= Roy Sáenz =

Costa Rican footballer (born 1944)

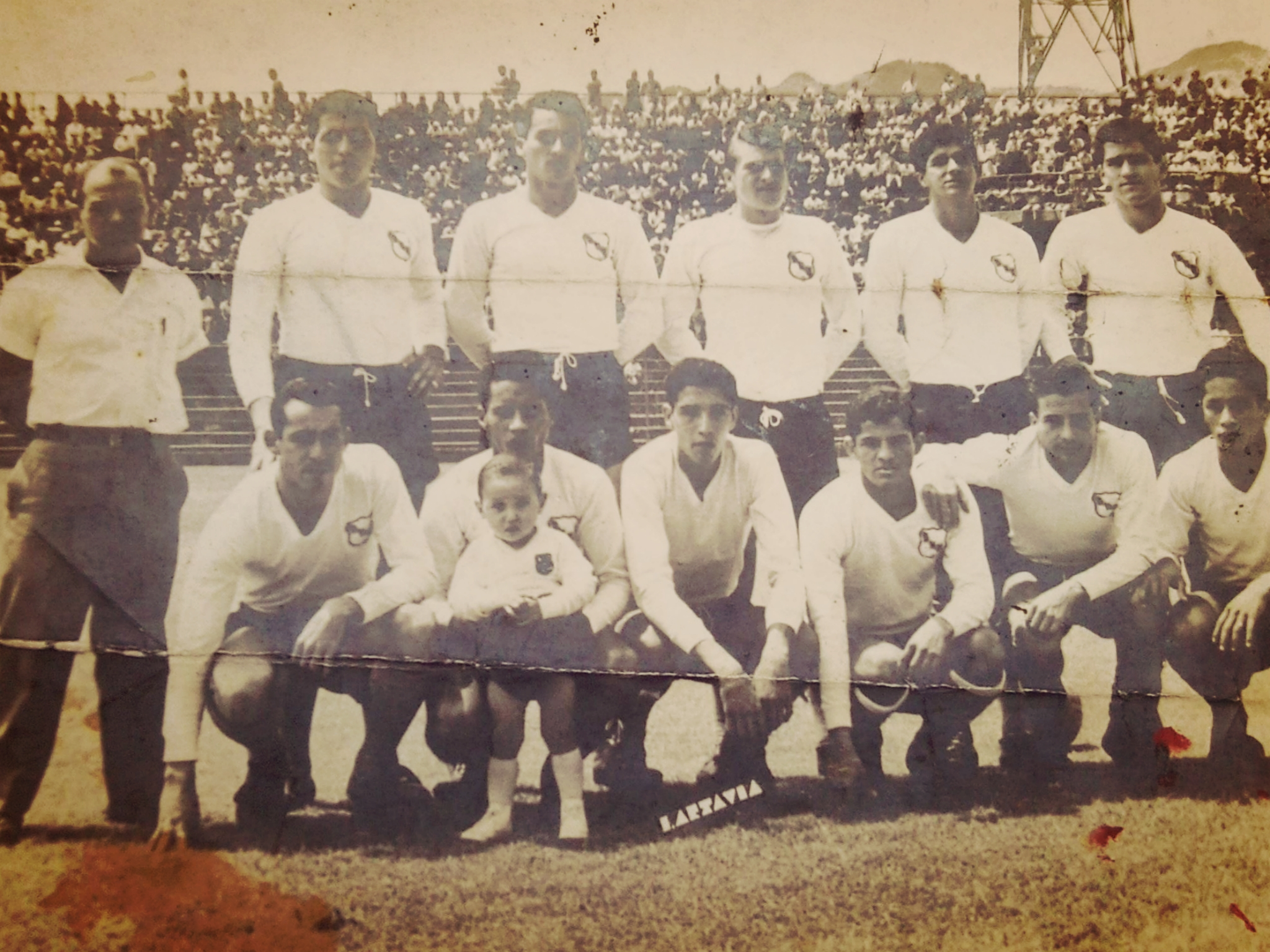
- Deportivo Nicolás Marín in the early sixties with the top scorer Roy Sáenz

Personal information
- Full name: Roy Francisco Sáenz Acuña
- Date of birth: 5 December 1944 (age 81)
- Place of birth: Limón, Costa Rica
- Position: Striker

Youth career
- 1960: Saprissa
- 1961–1962: Atlante de Barrio México

Senior career*
Years	Team	Apps	(Gls)
1963–1964	Barrio México		
1965	Orión		
1966–1968	Barrio México		
1969–1975	Alajuelense		(84)
1976	UES		
1976–1977	Barrio México		
1978	Limonense		
1979–1980	Barrio México		

International career
1965–1972	Costa Rica	27	(12)
- * Club domestic league appearances and goals

Roy Francisco Sáenz Acuña (born 5 December 1944) is a retired Costa Rican football player, who used to play as a striker.

== Club career ==
Sáenz made his Primera División debut for Barrio México and played a major part of his career for Alajuelense. He was the top scorer of the Primera División twice, in 1969 and 1971 and totalled 168 goals in the Costa Rica Primera División in 363 matches. He scored a total of 234 goals in all competitions. (league, cup, national team and internal club matches) He won two league titles and scored 84 goals for Liga, ranking him 3rd on the club's all-time goalscorers list.

Sáenz had a short spell abroad with Salvadoran side Universidad and retired in 1980.

== International career ==
Saéz was also part of the Ticos, playing 27 games and scoring 12 goals. He represented his country in four FIFA World Cup qualification matches and scored during the 1969 CONCACAF Championship.

== Managerial career ==
After retiring, Sáenz managed second division sides El Carmen, Palmares, Uruguay de Coronado, La Unión, Curridabat and Puriscal. He also worked as a sales executive. In summer 2010 he was chosen as president of former club Barrio México on their return to the Primera División. He replaced Brujas president Minor Vargas who was not allowed to lead two different clubs.
