= Hernán Morales =

Costa Rican footballer (born 1951)

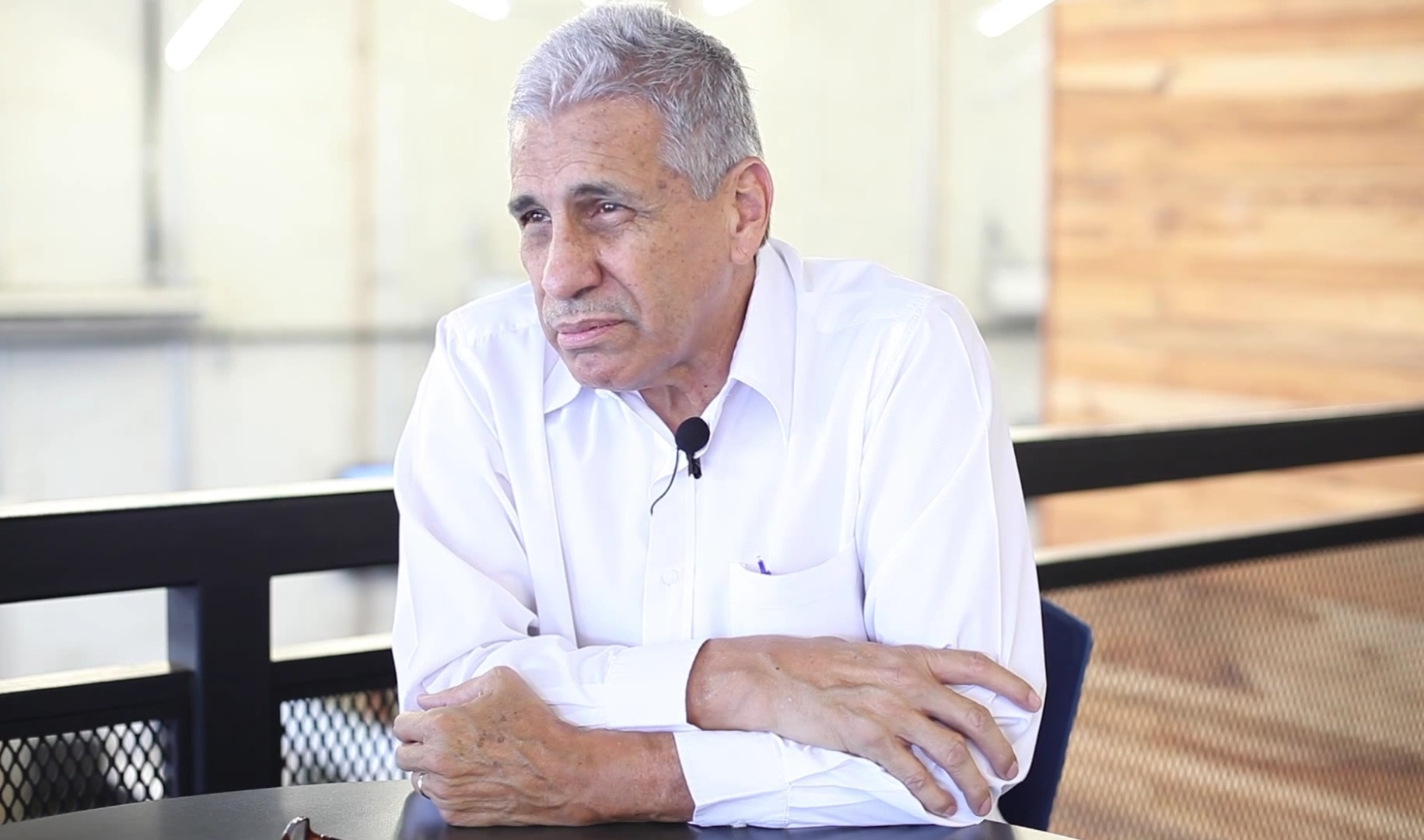
- Morales in 2015

Personal information
- Full name: Hernán Morales Martínez
- Date of birth: 27 April 1951 (age 75)
- Place of birth: San José, San José Province, Costa Rica
- Position: Left winger

Youth career
- 1966–1971: Saprissa

Senior career*
Years	Team	Apps	(Gls)
1971–1978	Saprissa		
1975	→ San Jose Earthquakes (loan)		
1978–1982	Cartaginés		

International career
1971–1976	Costa Rica	19	(2)
Medal record
Men's football
Representing Costa Rica
CONCACAF Championship
Bronze medal – third place	1971 Trinidad and Tobago	Team
- * Club domestic league appearances and goals

Hernán Morales Martínez (born 27 April 1951) is a Costa Rican retired footballer. He primarily played for Saprissa and Cartaginés as a left winger throughout the 1970s and the early 1980s within the Liga FPD as well as playing for the San Jose Earthquakes within the North American Soccer League. He also represented Costa Rica internationally for the 1971 CONCACAF Championship.

== Club career ==
Morales was born on 27 April 1951 as the son of Don Hernán Morales and Melba Martínez. He grew up playing football within the Barrio Santa Lucia near Salubridad despite his father not taking much interest in football. He later caught the attention of Saprissa as he became incorporated within their youth sector in 1962. He later made his senior debut on 21 March 1971, scoring his first goal in a match against Ramonense. He made a strong impression at just the age of 20 that by the time the first half of the 1971 Primera División de Costa Rica, he had already scored 4 goals. Throughout his career, he was defined as being a left winger that would come in as a substitute that would quickly manage to score a goal. The following 1972 Primera División de Costa Rica also saw him develop a reputation for throwing corner kicks as a way to score goals reliably. He was also known for establishing a midfielding duo alongside Fernando Hernández as Saprissa went on to win the tournament. The following 1973 Primera División de Costa Rica saw Saprissa win another title with Morales contributing 5 goals throughout the season. Despite Saprissa also winning yet again for the 1974 Primera División de Costa Rica, Morales had found himself given his first suspension as during a match against Cartaginés, he was booked after the referee determined he had assaulted a Cartaginés player. However, he wouldn't play in the 1975 Primera División de Costa Rica as Morales attracted the attention of the San Jose Earthquakes within the United States on loan from a period of the second week of April till 25 August. Throughout his career with the San José Earthquakes, he played alongside fellow Costa Rican footballer William Quirós though he would largely go unused throughout the 1975 season as he got injured during training and only played in friendlies. By the end of the season, Morales returned to Costa Rica in time to celebrate Saprissa's third consecutive title in the tournament with Morales scoring twice in the final matchday against Ramonense.

Morales would continue to find great success within Saprissa as he was part of the winning squads for the 1976 and 1977 Primera División de Costa Rica. His last complete season with Saprissa was through the 1978 Primera División de Costa Rica as the following 1979 Primera División de Costa Rica saw him play for Cartaginés as the club were runners-up by the end of the season. During the 1981 Primera División de Costa Rica, he began to serve as a player-coach following the departure of Salvadoran assistant coach Mauricio Quintana. Despite wanting to continue with his career within the Liga FPD, by the 1983 Primera División de Costa Rica, no club had took interest in him due to his age by that point, causing him to retire before the season began in 27 February.

== International career ==
Morales was first called up to represent Costa Rica for the 1971 CONCACAF Championship. Throughout the tournament, he played in all 5 matches as he scored the first of two goals in a 2–1 victory over Honduras. His international career continued into the 1973 CONCACAF Championship qualifiers against Honduras for both legs. Similarly, he was called up for the subsequent 1977 CONCACAF Championship qualifiers where the Ticos would once more, fail to qualify for the tournament.

== Personal life ==
Morales later got married with Ana Ross on 17 January 1976. He is also a practicing Catholic.
