= William Bennett (football manager) =

Cuban football manager

Personal information
- Full name: William Mathias Bennett Barracks
- Place of birth: Cuba
- Position: Goalkeeper

Managerial career
- Years: Team
- 1996–2000: Cuba
- 2004–2005: Dominican Republic

William Bennett Barracks is a Cuban professional football manager and former player.

== Career ==
As a player, Bennett played as a goalkeeper.

From 1996 until 2000, he was head coach of the Cuba national team. From 2004 until 2005, he coached the Dominican Republic national team.
