= José Luis Elejalde =

Cuban footballer (1951–2018)

Personal information
- Full name: José Luis Elejalde Gorostiza
- Date of birth: 14 January 1951
- Date of death: 18 February 2018 (aged 67)
- Position: Midfielder

Senior career*
Years	Team	Apps	(Gls)
- La Habana

International career
1970–1976	Cuba		
- * Club domestic league appearances and goals

José Luis Elejalde Gorostiza (14 January 1951 – 18 February 2018) was a Cuban footballer who competed in the 1976 Summer Olympics. He died on 18 February 2018 at the age of 67.

== Club career ==
Nicknamed el Caballo (the Horse), Elejalde played in midfield for La Habana.

== International career ==
He represented his country in 3 FIFA World Cup qualifying matches and played two games at the 1976 Summer Olympics.
