= Wálter Elizondo =

Costa Rican footballer (1942–2018)

Personal information
- Full name: Wálter Elizondo Gómez
- Date of birth: 4 November 1942
- Place of birth: El Carmen, Cartago, Costa Rica
- Date of death: 20 November 2018 (aged 76)
- Position: Defender

Youth career
- 1954–1961: Saprissa

Senior career*
Years	Team	Apps	(Gls)
1961–1963	Orión		
1964–1969	Saprissa		
1970–1974	Alajuelense		
1975–1977	Cartaginés		
1978	Herediano		
1979	Cartaginés		
Total		?	(44)

International career
1963–1975	Costa Rica	43	(5)

Managerial career
- 1977–1979: Cartaginés
- 1981–1982: Saprissa
- * Club domestic league appearances and goals

Wálter Elizondo Gómez (4 November 1942 – 20 November 2018) was a Costa Rican international footballer.

== Club career ==
Born in El Carmen, Cartago, Elizondo started his career at Orión after coming through the Saprissa youth system. He then played as a central defender for Saprissa for most of his career and between 1964 and 1969, Elizondo won five championships with them. He also won two championships with Alajuelense, and one with Herediano. He finished his career at Cartaginés. He scored 44 goals in total in the Costa Rican premier division.

Elizondo was named one of the top 100 Costa Rican footballers of all-time in 2009 and the best of the 1970s.

== International career ==
Elizondo appeared in 43 matches and scored 5 goals for the full Costa Rica national football team from 1963 to 1975. He has represented his country in 12 FIFA World Cup qualification matches.

== Managerial career ==
After retiring from a playing career in 1978, Elizondo went on to manage Cartaginés and Saprissa.

== Personal life ==
Elizondo's father, Guillermo Elizondo Gómez, was also a Costa Rican international footballer.

Elizondo suffered a stroke during March 2008.
