= René Bonora =

Cuban footballer (1951–2025)

Personal information
- Date of birth: 20 June 1951
- Place of birth: Camagüey Province, Cuba
- Date of death: 15 May 2025 (aged 73)
- Place of death: Camagüey Province, Cuba
- Height: 1.70 m (5 ft 7 in)
- Position: Defender

Senior career*
Years	Team	Apps	(Gls)
1970–1980	FC Granjeros		

International career
1971–1980	Cuba		
- * Club domestic league appearances and goals

René Bonora Puerta (20 June 1951 – 15 May 2025) was a Cuban footballer who competed in the 1976 Summer Olympics. Bonora died in May 2025, at the age of 73.

== International career ==
Hailing from Camagüey Province, Bonora also represented his country in five FIFA World Cup qualification matches.
