= Miguel Rivero =

Cuban footballer

Personal information
- Full name: Miguel Rivero Bonilla
- Date of birth: 14 March 1952 (age 74)
- Height: 1.70 m (5 ft 7 in)
- Position: Defender

Senior career*
Years	Team	Apps	(Gls)
- FC La Habana

International career
1976	Cuba		
- * Club domestic league appearances and goals

Miguel Rivero Bonilla (born 14 March 1952) is a Cuban former footballer who competed in the 1976 Summer Olympics.

== International career ==
He represented his country in 1 FIFA World Cup qualification match.
