= Javier de la Torre =

Mexican association football player (1923–2006)

Personal information
- Full name: Javier de la Torre Jiménez
- Date of birth: 19 December 1923
- Place of birth: Aguascalientes, Mexico
- Date of death: 26 November 2006 (aged 82)
- Place of death: Guadalajara, Mexico
- Position: Midfielder

Youth career
- 1932-1943: Guadalajara

Senior career*
Years	Team	Apps	(Gls)
1943-1955	Guadalajara		(70)

Managerial career
- 1955-1957: Guadalajara
- 1960-1972: Guadalajara
- 1970-1973: Mexico
- 1974: Celaya
- 1975: Club Jalisco
- 1976: Leones Negros
- 1977: Tecos de la UAG
- * Club domestic league appearances and goals

Javier de la Torre Jiménez (19 December 1923 – 26 November 2006) was a Mexican professional footballer and manager. He spent his entire playing career with Guadalajara and later managed the team during the Campeonísimo era.

As a manager, he secured 14 championships with Guadalajara: five Primera División titles, one Copa México, six Campeón de Campeones trophies, and a CONCACAF Champions Cup. These achievements established him as the most successful manager in the club's history.

His son, Eduardo de la Torre, and his nephews José Manuel and Néstor played for Guadalajara; in addition, the first two also managed the club.

== Career ==
Born in Aguascalientes in 1923, de la Torre grew up in Guadalajara. At 19, he made his debut with Chivas in the 1943-44 season, the inaugural professional campaign. He went on to play twelve seasons with the club, establishing himself as one of its most consistent performers by appearing in 278 matches and scoring 81 goals before retiring in 1955.

The following year, he took charge as manager of El Rebaño for three seasons, a period in which he began laying the foundations of the legendary Campeonísimo. Across his two managerial stints with Chivas, he dedicated 15 years of service to the club, guiding it to glory alongside a generation of players unmatched in Mexican football history. Under his leadership, Guadalajara's trophy cabinet swelled with 14 official titles, including the club's first-ever international honor.

== Honours ==
=== Player ===
Guadalajara

- Copa de Oro de Occidente: 1954, 1955, 1956

=== Manager ===
Guadalajara

- Mexican Primera División: 1960-61, 1961-62, 1963-64, 1964-65, 1969-70
- Copa México: 1962–63
- Campeón de Campeones: 1961, 1964, 1965
- CONCACAF Champions Cup: 1962

Mexico

- CONCACAF Championship: 1971
