= C.D. Barrio México =

Costa Rican football club

Barrio México
- Full name: Barrio México Fútbol Club
- Founded: May 9, 1948; 78 years ago
- Ground: Estadio José Joaquín "Coyella" Fonseca, Guadalupe, Costa Rica
- Manager: Carlos Hernández Valverde
- League: LINAFA
- Clausura 2022: Group B - Occidente
Home colours	Away colours

Barrio México Fútbol Club is a Costa Rican football club, which currently plays in the Costa Rican second division.

== History ==
=== Nicolás Marín ===
Barrio México was one of the first clubs in Costa Rica to form. It was founded 9 May 1948 with the name of Nicolas Marin, they went on to win two titles in the second division. They debuted in the Primera División on 22 April 1964 against Herediano and in 1967 they were renamed Asociación Deportiva Barrio México. From 1976, they were named just Deportivo México and in 1978 they changed their name to San Jose Municipal, winning another title. Since 1984 they are known as Club Deportivo Barrio México.

=== Club Deportivo Barrio México ===
This club was one of the first in the history of Costa Rican football where fans sang songs in the stadium. Known as The Team Canela (The Cinnamon Team). In its glory days, had players of the quality of José Manuel "Chinimba" Rojas, Sergio Blanco, William and Johnny Fischer, among others. In 1981, Johnny Fischer, Miguel Arias and Rándall Gómez as well a member of the technical staff Guillermo Orozco were killed in an accident with the bus returning from a training session. The club returned to the first division through the purchase of the franchise that belonged to Liberia Mía, for the 2010–2011 season, after more than 20 years of being absent from this competition.

However, they were demoted in March 2011 after the club could not meet its financial obligations. In January 2015, they were stripped of their 2014 Apertura title. In January 2018 went the club bankruptcy.

=== Barrio México Fútbol Club ===
In the 2017-2018 season, the club was forced to disappear, due to having a huge debt with the CCSS, for which it withdrew its participation from the tournament. For the 2018-2019 season, their return to the First Division of Linafa is expected through a new legal status as a Sports Association, despite that in the 2018-2019 campaign of Linafa in the third division of Costa Rican soccer they rose again. by beating San Luis de Puntarenas on May 19, 2019 by a global of 2-1.

== Stadium ==
José Joaquín "Coyella" Fonseca Stadium The venue has historically been used by clubs from the Second Division and the First Division of Costa Rica.

He was baptized with the name of Abel Rodríguez Sequeira by Municipal Agreement of the ordinary session of the Council No. 99-74 held on Wednesday, November 6, 1974, which was approved unanimously, firmly, prior opinion of the Commission of Social Affairs, Culture and Sports, in extraordinary session No. 9-74 on Tuesday, October 22, 1974, of the aldermen Zamora Chávez, Jiménez Chavarría, and Molina Molina, that name in homage to the former Municipal Executive of the Municipality of the Canton of Goicoechea, the agreement is in FORCE, it was not executed and the property was named after an outstanding soccer player in the community.

Originally, it was a small sports building with wooden bleachers and natural grass, managed entirely by the municipality of Goicoechea. It was the headquarters of the local soccer team, the Municipal Goicoechea (now disappeared) for several decades, from the 70s to the early 2000s.

The artificial grass acquired regulatory lengths of 105 meters long by 70 meters wide and the stadium has a capacity for 4,000 to 4,500 spectators.

Since December 2009, the Abel Rodríguez Sequeira, Cancha Colleya Fonseca returned to prominence in all categories. Even at the beginning of February 2010, the Senior National Team trained for several days in Guadeloupe. The facilities are rented to amateur teams at all hours of the day.

== List of Coaches ==
- (Costa Rica) José Joaquín "Pachico" García
- (Costa Rica) Leonardo Mata (2000)
- (Costa Rica) Rónald Gómez (June 2021)
- (Costa Rica) Gilberto Martínez (July 2021 - February 2022)
