= 1971 CONCACAF Championship =

Tournament details
- Host country: Trinidad and Tobago
- Dates: 20 November – 5 December
- Teams: 6 (from 1 confederation)
- Venue: 4 (in 3 host cities)

Final positions
- Champions: Mexico (2nd title)
- Runners-up: Haiti
- Third place: Costa Rica
- Fourth place: Cuba

Tournament statistics
- Matches played: 15
- Goals scored: 37 (2.47 per match)

The 1971 CONCACAF Championship, the fifth edition of the CONCACAF Championship, was held in Trinidad and Tobago from 20 November to 5 December.

== Teams ==
- Costa Rica (Defending Champions)
- Cuba
- Haiti
- Honduras
- Mexico
- Trinidad and Tobago (Hosts)

== Venues ==
Port of Spain		San Fernando
Queen's Park Oval	King George V Park	Skinner Park
Capacity: 25,000	Capacity:	Capacity:
1971 CONCACAF Championship is located in Trinidad and Tobago		Arima
1971 CONCACAF Championship is located in Trinidad and Tobago		Arima Velodrome
1971 CONCACAF Championship is located in Trinidad and Tobago		Capacity:

== Final tournament ==
Pos	Team	Pld	W	D	L	GF	GA	GD	Pts
1	Mexico	5	4	1	0	6	1	+5	9
2	Haiti	5	2	3	0	9	1	+8	7
3	Costa Rica	5	2	1	2	6	5	+1	5
4	Cuba	5	1	2	2	5	7	−2	4
5	Trinidad and Tobago	5	1	2	2	6	12	−6	4
6	Honduras	5	0	1	4	5	11	−6	1

20 November 1971

Costa Rica	3–0	Cuba
Roy Sáenz 42', 44'; Alfonso Estupiñán 55'

Trinidad and Tobago

21 November 1971

Mexico	0–0	Haiti

Trinidad and Tobago

21 November 1971

Trinidad and Tobago	1–1	Honduras
Douglas 25'		Matamoros 36' (pen.)

Trinidad and Tobago

23 November 1971

Cuba	3–1	Honduras
Francisco Piedra 10'; Andrés Roldán 26'; José Verdecia 49'		Jorge Brand 59'

Trinidad and Tobago

24 November 1971

Haiti	0–0	Costa Rica

Trinidad and Tobago

26 November 1971

Trinidad and Tobago	0–2	Mexico
		Jiménez 46'; Rodríguez 85' (pen.)

Trinidad and Tobago

27 November 1971

Costa Rica	2–1	Honduras
Hernán Morales 10'; Roy Sáenz 38'		Oscar Hernandez 45'

Trinidad and Tobago

28 November 1971

Mexico	1–0	Cuba
Roberto Rodríguez 15' (pen.)

Trinidad and Tobago

28 November 1971

Trinidad and Tobago	1–6	Haiti
Wilfred Cave 7'		Pierre Bayonne 40', 81'; Sanon 43' Leintz Domingue 44'; Ramon Moraldo 51' (o.g.) Claude Barthelemy 75'

Trinidad and Tobago
Attendance: 10,000

30 November 1971

Trinidad and Tobago	2–2	Cuba
Cave 15'; Lennard 70'		José Luis Elejalde 77'; Dagoberto Lara 89'

Trinidad and Tobago

1 December 1971

Haiti	3–1	Honduras
Pierre Bayonne 28'; Sanon 41'; Jean-Claude Desir 44'		Arnulfo Echeverría 1'

Trinidad and Tobago

2 December 1971

Mexico	1–0	Costa Rica
Roberto Rodríguez 73'

Trinidad and Tobago

4 December 1971

Mexico	2–1	Honduras
Octavio Muciño 42', 83'		Rigoberto Gómez 69'

Trinidad and Tobago

4 December 1971

Haiti	0–0	Cuba

Trinidad and Tobago

5 December 1971

Trinidad and Tobago	3–1	Costa Rica
Aubert Philips 30'; Steve David 58'; Anthony Douglas 69'		Emilio Valle 24'

Trinidad and Tobago

== Team of the Tournament ==
Ideal XI by RSSSF
Goalkeeper	Defenders	Midfielders	Forwards
(Mexico) Rafael Puente	(Mexico) Genaro Bermúdez (Cuba) Miguel Rivero (Costa Rica) Walter Elizondo	(Haiti) Philippe Vorbe (Mexico) Juan Manuel Medina	(Mexico) Monito Rodríguez (Mexico) Octavio Muciño (Costa Rica) Roy Sáenz (Haiti) Emmanuel Sanon (Haiti) Pierre Bayonne

== Result ==
1971 CONCACAF Championship winners

Mexico
Second title
