= 1973 CONCACAF Championship squads =

These are the squads for the countries that played in the 1973 CONCACAF Championship.

The age listed for each player is on 29 November 1973, the first day of the tournament. The numbers of caps and goals listed for each player do not include any matches played after the start of the tournament. The club listed is the club for which the player last played a competitive match before the tournament. The nationality for each club reflects the national association (not the league) to which the club is affiliated. A flag is included for coaches who are of a different nationality than their own national team.

For the first time, half of the countries had players representing foreign clubs with Haiti (1), Honduras (1) and Trinidad and Tobago (4).

== Netherlands Antilles ==
Head coach: Wilhelm Canword

No.	Pos.	Player	Date of birth (age)	Caps	Club
1	GK	Anthony Raven			(Netherlands Antilles) Jong Colombia
2	MF	Antonio Bonifacio (captain)			(Netherlands Antilles) Jong Colombia
3	DF	Erwin Melfor			(Netherlands Antilles) Veendam
4	DF	Siegfried Brunken			(Netherlands Antilles) Victory Boys
5	DF	Reginald Clemencia			(Netherlands Antilles) Jong Colombia
6	MF	Mouris Maria			(Netherlands Antilles) Centro Dominguito
7	FW	Guillermo Zimmerman			(Netherlands Antilles) Jong Colombia
8	FW	Errol Virginie			(Netherlands Antilles) Sithoc
9	FW	Humphrey Koots			(Netherlands Antilles) Veendam
10	MF	Elio Flores			(Netherlands Antilles) Juventus
11	FW	Adelbert Toppenberg			(Netherlands Antilles) SUBT
12	FW	Siegfried Schoop			(Netherlands Antilles) SUBT
13	MF	Hyacintho Tromp			(Netherlands Antilles) Bubali
14	FW	Remolder Djaoen			(Netherlands Antilles) Centro Barber
15	DF	Eddy Zinhagel			(Netherlands Antilles) Veendam
16	DF	Johnny Coster			(Netherlands Antilles) Veendam
17	GK	Carlos Bernadina			(Netherlands Antilles) Dakota
18	FW	Franklin Victoria			(Netherlands Antilles) Jong Colombia
29	MF	Errol St. Jago			(Netherlands Antilles) Juventus
20	GK	Eddy Zinhagel			(Netherlands Antilles) Veendam

== Guatemala ==
Head Coach: (Chile) Néstor Valdés

No.	Pos.	Player	Date of birth (age)	Caps	Club
1	GK	Víctor Hugo Guerra			(Guatemala) Aurora
2	DF	Octavio López Aguilar	25 March 1948 (aged 25)		(Guatemala) Aurora
3	DF	Horacio Hasse	13 July 1945 (aged 28)		(Guatemala) Cementos Novella
4	DF	Luis Villavicencio	3 February 1950 (aged 23)		(Guatemala) Comunicaciones
5	DF	Armando Melgar	25 November 1944 (aged 29)		(Guatemala) Municipal
6	MF	Jorge Roldán (captain)	16 December 1940 (aged 32)		(Guatemala) Aurora
7	FW	René Morales	22 February 1953 (aged 20)		(Guatemala) Aurora
8	DF	Julio Gómez)	28 October 1954 (aged 19)		(Guatemala) Aurora
9	FW	Edgar Hernán González	1 February 1948 (aged 25)		(Guatemala) Aurora
10	MF	Edgar Bolaños	20 February 1951 (aged 22)		(Guatemala) Comunicaciones
11	FW	Julio César Anderson	27 November 1947 (aged 26)		(Guatemala) Municipal\
12	GK	Antonio Galán			(Guatemala) Comunicaciones
13	DF	Carlos Monterroso	28 July 1948 (aged 25)		(Guatemala) Cementos Novella
14	MF	Benjamín Monterroso	1 September 1952 (aged 21)		(Guatemala) Municipal
15	FW	Víctor Hugo Méndez			(Guatemala) Aurora
16	FW	Marco Fión	17 January 1947 (aged 26)		(Guatemala) Municipal
17	DF	Roberto Ochoa	17 April 1945 (aged 28)		(Guatemala) Aurora
18	FW	Bobby Tally	24 September 1951 (aged 22)		(Guatemala) Aurora
19	DF	Alberto López Oliva	10 March 1944 (aged 29)		(Guatemala) Municipal
20	FW	Peter Sandoval	22 April 1947 (aged 26)		(Guatemala) Comunicaciones
21	GK	Rómulo Estrada			(Guatemala) Aurora
22	FW	David Stokes	4 January 1946 (aged 27)		(Guatemala) JUCA
23	MF	Juan Banegas			(Guatemala)

== Haiti ==
Head coach: Antoine Tassy

No.	Pos.	Player	Date of birth (age)	Caps	Club
1	GK	Henri Françillon	26 May 1946 (aged 27)		(Haiti) Victory
2	DF	Pierre Bayonne	11 June 1949 (aged 24)		(Haiti) Violette
3	DF	Arsène Auguste	3 February 1951 (aged 22)	1	(Haiti) Racing Club Haïtien
4	DF	Fritz André	18 September 1946 (aged 27)		(Haiti) Violette
5	DF	Wilner Nazaire (captain)	30 March 1950 (aged 23)		(France) Valenciennes
6	MF	Guy François	18 September 1947 (aged 26)		(Haiti) Violette
7	MF	Philippe Vorbe	14 September 1947 (aged 26)		(Haiti) Violette
8	FW	Guy Saint-Vil	21 October 1942 (aged 31)	1	(Haiti) Racing Haïtien
9	MF	Jean-Claude Désir	8 August 1946 (aged 27)		(Haiti) Aigle Noir
10	FW	Emmanuel Sanon	25 June 1951 (aged 22)		(Haiti) Don Bosco
11	FW	Roger Saint-Vil	8 December 1949 (aged 23)		(Haiti) Violette
12	MF	Eddy Antoine	27 August 1949 (aged 24)	1	(Haiti) Racing Haïtien
13	GK	Wilner Piquant	12 October 1949 (aged 24)		(Haiti) Aigle Noir
14	DF	Serge Ducosté	4 February 1944 (aged 29)	0	(Haiti) Aigle Noir
15	MF	Ernst Jean-Joseph	11 June 1948 (aged 25)		(Haiti) Violette
16	DF	Formose Gilles	22 October 1942 (aged 31)		(Haiti) Violette
17	MF	Joseph-Marion Leandré	9 May 1945 (aged 28)	1	(Haiti) Racing Haïtien
18	FW	Fritz Leandré	13 March 1948 (aged 25)	0	(Haiti) Racing Haïtien
19	FW	Claude Barthélemy	9 May 1945 (aged 28)	1	(Haiti) Racing Club Haïtien
20	GK	Gérard Joseph	22 October 1949 (aged 24)	?	(Haiti) Racing Haïtien
21	DF	Wilfried Louis	25 October 1949 (aged 24)	?	(Haiti) Don Bosco
22	DF	Serge Racine	9 October 1951 (aged 22)	1	(Haiti) Aigle Noir

== Honduras ==
Head coach: Carlos Padilla

No.	Pos.	Player	Date of birth (age)	Caps	Club
1	GK	Jimmy Steward	9 December 1946 (aged 26)	?	(Honduras) Platense
2	DF	Mauricio Álvarez	1946 (aged 28)		(Honduras) Real España
3	DF	Miguel Ángel Matamoros (captain)	10 May 1949 (aged 24)		(Honduras) Olimpia
4	DF	José María Durón	1952 (aged 21)		(Honduras) Real España
5	DF	Jaime Villegas	5 July 1950 (aged 23)	0	(Honduras) Real España
6	FW	Rubén Guifarro	15 October 1946 (aged 27)		(Honduras) Motagua
7	MF	Óscar Hernández	10 June 1950 (aged 23)		(Honduras) Motagua
8	MF	Mariano Godoy	17 October 1950 (aged 23)		(Honduras) Motagua
9	FW	Rigoberto Gómez Murillo	16 December 1944 (aged 28)		(Honduras) Olimpia
10	FW	Mario Blandón	1949 (aged 26)		(Honduras) Motagua
11	FW	Jorge Bran	1 June 1946 (aged 27)		(Spain) Mallorca
12	DF	José Luis Cruz	2 February 1952 (aged 21)		(Honduras) Motagua
13	GK	Salomón Nazar	7 September 1953 (aged 20)	?	(Honduras) Universidad
14	DF	Selvin Cárcamo	25 May 1949 (aged 24)		(Honduras) Olimpia
15	DF	Ernesto Ramírez Lara	1951 (aged 22)		(Honduras) Real España
16	FW	Reynaldo Mejía	29 July 1946 (aged 27)		(Honduras) Victoria
17	MF	Ángel Ramón Paz	28 October 1950 (aged 21)		(Honduras) Olimpia
18	MF	Estanislao Ortega	16 November 1950 (aged 23)		(Honduras) Real España
19	MF	Arturo Bonilla	23 January 1953 (aged 20)		(Honduras) Marathón
20	FW	Rigoberto Sosa	12 January 1951 (aged 22)		(Honduras) Motagua
21	GK	Samuel Sentini	1948 (aged 25)		(Honduras) Olimpia

== Mexico ==
Head coach: Javier de la Torre

No.	Pos.	Player	Date of birth (age)	Caps	Club
1	GK	Ignacio Calderón	13 December 1943 (aged 29)		(Mexico) Guadalajara
2	DF	Genaro Bermúdez	3 September 1950 (aged 23)		(Mexico) Pumas UNAM
3	DF	Javier Guzmán	9 January 1945 (aged 28)		(Mexico) Cruz Azul
4	DF	Guillermo Hernández (captain)	25 June 1942 (aged 31)		(Mexico) Club América
5	DF	Javier Sánchez	26 November 1947 (aged 26)		(Mexico) Cruz Azul
6	MF	Antonio de la Torre	21 September 1951 (aged 22)		(Mexico) Pumas UNAM
7	MF	Héctor Pulido	20 December 1942 (aged 30)		(Mexico) Cruz Azul
8	FW	Fernando Bustos	1 August 1944 (aged 29)		(Mexico) Cruz Azul
9	FW	Enrique Borja	30 December 1945 (aged 27)		(Mexico) Club América
10	FW	Pepe Delgado	10 January 1947 (aged 26)		(Mexico) Atlas
11	MF	Leonardo Cuéllar	14 January 1952 (aged 21)		(Mexico) Pumas UNAM
12	GK	Héctor Brambila	6 July 1950 (aged 23)		(Mexico) Atlas
13	DF	Eduardo Ramos	9 November 1949 (aged 24)		(Mexico) Toluca
14	DF	Juan Manuel Álvarez	12 April 1948 (aged 25)		(Mexico) Atlético Español
15	DF	Arturo Vázquez Ayala	26 June 1949 (aged 24)		(Mexico) Pumas UNAM
16	FW	Cesáreo Victorino	8 February 1948 (aged 25)		(Mexico) Jalisco
17	FW	Manuel Lapuente	15 May 1944 (aged 29)		(Mexico) Puebla
18	FW	José de Jesús Valdez	1 June 1947 (aged 26)		(Mexico) León
19	FW	Ricardo Chavarín	3 July 1951 (aged 22)		(Mexico) Atlas
20	FW	Octavio Muciño	14 May 1950 (aged 23)		(Mexico) Guadalajara
21	FW	Horacio López Salgado	15 September 1948 (aged 25)		(Mexico) Cruz Azul
22	GK	Rafael Puente	5 February 1950 (aged 23)		(Mexico) Atlante

== Trinidad and Tobago ==
Head coach: (England) Kevin Verity

No.	Pos.	Player	Date of birth (age)	Caps	Club
1	GK	Kelvin Barclay	26 May 1945 (aged 28)		(Trinidad and Tobago) Malvern
2	DF	Russell Tesheira	24 March 1951 (aged 22)		(Trinidad and Tobago) Malvern
3	DF	Winston Phillips	8 February 1945 (aged 28)		(Trinidad and Tobago)
4	DF	Selwyn Murren	30 November 1944 (aged 28)		(Trinidad and Tobago) Shell
5	DF	Ramon Moraldo	18 July 1951 (aged 22)		(Trinidad and Tobago) Forest Reserve
6	DF	Lawrence Rondon	4 September 1949 (aged 24)		(Trinidad and Tobago) Caroní
7	MF	Peter Mitchell	19 October 1953 (aged 20)		(Trinidad and Tobago) Caroní
8	MF	Everald Cummings	28 August 1948 (aged 25)		(United States) New York Cosmos
9	MF	Dennis Morgan			(Trinidad and Tobago)
10	FW	Steve David	11 March 1951 (aged 22)		(Mexico) San Luis
11	MF	Warren Archibald	1 August 1949 (aged 24)		(United States) Miami Toros
12	MF	Tony Douglas	16 August 1952 (aged 21)		(Trinidad and Tobago) Point Fortin Civic
13	FW	Raymond Roberts	31 January 1950 (aged 23)		(Trinidad and Tobago) Point Fortin Civic
14	MF	Leon Carpette	10 April 1950 (aged 19)		(Trinidad and Tobago) Paragon
15	MF	Sydney Augustine			(Trinidad and Tobago) Shamrock
16	FW	Leo Brewster	31 October 1950 (aged 23)		(Trinidad and Tobago) Point Fortin Civic
17	DF	Selris Figaro	20 November 1946 (aged 27)		(United States) Miami Toros
18	DF	Henry Dennie			(Trinidad and Tobago)
19	FW	Steve Rakib Khan	26 August 1948 (aged 25)		(Trinidad and Tobago)
20	FW	Wilfred Cave	23 May 1948 (aged 21)		(Trinidad and Tobago) Caroni
21	GK	Gerald Figeroux	23 May 1943 (aged 30)		(Trinidad and Tobago) Paragon
22	GK	Devenish Paul	16 December 1948 (aged 24)		(Trinidad and Tobago)
