= 2010–11 Venezuelan Primera División season =

Copa Movilnet
- Season: 2010–11
- Champions: Deportivo Táchira (7th title)
- Relegated: Atlético Venezuela; Caroní
- 2012 Copa Libertadores: Deportivo Táchira; Zamora; Caracas
- 2011 Copa Sudamericana: Deportivo Anzoátegui; Yaracuyanos
- Top goalscorer: Daniel Arismendi (19 goals)

The 2010–11 Primera División season (officially the 2010–11 Copa Movilnet for sponsorship reasons) is the 29th professional season of Venezuela's top-flight football league.

== Teams ==
Eighteen teams will participate this season, sixteen of whom remain from the previous season. Centro Italo Venezolano and Llaneros were relegated after accumulating the fewest points in the 2009–10 season aggregate table. They were replaced by Atlético Venezuela and Caroní, the 2009 Segunda División Apertura runner-up and 2010 Segunda División Clausura winner, respectively. In addition, Deportivo Italia changed their name to Deportivo Petare in the off-season.

Team	City	Stadium
Aragua	Maracay	Olímpico Hermanos Ghersi Páez
Atlético Venezuela	Maiquetía	Polideportivo José María Vargas
Carabobo	Valencia	Misael Delgado
Caracas	Caracas	Olímpico de la UCV
Caroní	Ciudad Guayana	Polideportivo Cachamay
Deportivo Anzoátegui	Puerto La Cruz	José Antonio Anzoátegui
Deportivo Lara	Barquisimeto	Metropolitano de Barquisimeto
Deportivo Petare	Caracas	Olímpico de la UCV
Deportivo Táchira	San Cristóbal	Polideportivo de Pueblo Nuevo
El Vigía	El Vigía	Ramón "Gato" Hernández
Estudiantes	Mérida	Metropolitano de Mérida
Mineros	Ciudad Guayana	Polideportivo Cachamay
Monagas	Maturín	Monumental de Maturín
Real Esppor	Caracas	Brígido Iriarte
Trujillanos	Valera	Luis Loreto Lira
Yaracuyanos	San Felipe	Florentino Oropeza
Zamora	Barinas	Agustín Tovar
Zulia	Maracaibo	José "Pachencho" Romero

== Torneo Apertura ==
The Torneo Apertura is the first tournament of the season. It began on August 8, 2010 and ended on December 12, 2010.

=== Standings ===
Pos	Team	Pld	W	D	L	GF	GA	GD	Pts	Qualification
1	Deportivo Táchira	17	10	6	1	31	11	+20	36	Serie Final and the 2012 Copa Libertadores Second Stage
2	Real Esppor	17	11	3	3	30	11	+19	36	
3	Caracas	17	11	2	4	24	15	+9	35	
4	Deportivo Petare	17	9	6	2	25	17	+8	33	
5	Trujillanos	17	7	6	4	22	15	+7	27	
6	Aragua	17	8	3	6	22	20	+2	27	
7	Deportivo Anzoátegui	17	7	5	5	35	30	+5	26	
8	Yaracuyanos	17	6	8	3	20	17	+3	26	
9	Estudiantes de Mérida	17	6	4	7	18	22	−4	22	
10	Zulia	17	6	3	8	25	27	−2	21	
11	Mineros de Guayana	17	4	8	5	20	20	0	20	
12	Monagas	17	4	5	8	25	25	0	17	
13	Zamora	17	4	5	8	20	27	−7	17	
14	Atlético Venezuela	17	4	4	9	22	33	−11	16	
15	Deportivo Lara	17	3	7	7	23	28	−5	16	
16	Carabobo	17	3	7	7	15	21	−6	16	
17	Atlético El Vigía	17	2	8	7	18	25	−7	14	
18	Caroní	17	2	2	13	7	38	−31	8	

Rules for classification: 1st points; 2nd goal difference; 3rd goals scored.

=== Results ===
Home \ Away	ARA	ATV	AVE	CBO	CRC	CRN	DAN	DLA	DPE	DTA	EME	MGU	MON	RES	TRU	YAR	ZAM	ZUL
Aragua			1–2	1–0				2–2	2–1	0–1	3–1	1–0						0–1
Atlético El Vigía	0–0			3–1				1–1	3–3	0–0	0–0		2–1					
Atlético Venezuela		1–1			2–3	1–0	1–2							0–1	1–4	1–2	2–1	1–1
Carabobo			0–2			3–1	1–0	2–2						0–0	0–0	1–1	1–1	2–3
Caracas	1–2	2–1		1–0					2–2	0–0	1–0	1–0	3–0					
Caroní	0–2	1–0			0–1		1–7						0–3	0–1	1–0	1–1		
Deportivo Anzoátegui	2–4	2–2			3–0				2–2		2–1		3–1		3–3		3–2	
Deportivo Lara			3–2		1–3	4–0	1–1							1–3	0–1	1–3	2–2	0–1
Deportivo Petare			2–1	1–0		0–0		1–2		0–0		2–1		0–0		2–1		1–0
Deportivo Táchira			4–1	3–1		3–0	3–1	3–1				1–1		2–0		1–0		4–0
Estudiantes de Mérida			4–0	1–1		2–1		1–0	1–2	2–2		0–1		1–0				2–1
Mineros de Guayana		1–0	2–2	1–1		2–0	3–1	1–1						1–3		1–1		2–3
Monagas	2–2		2–2	0–1				1–1	2–4	2–0	6–0	0–0						3–2
Real Esppor	3–0	2–0			1–2		3–0						2–1		1–1	2–0	3–0	
Trujillanos	2–0	3–2			2–0				0–1	1–3	0–1	1–1	1–0				2–0	
Yaracuyanos	1–0	1–1			1–0		1–1				1–1		0–0		1–1		2–1	
Zamora	1–2	2–1			0–3	1–4			0–1	1–1	1–0	2–2	2–1					
Zulia		4–1			0–1	4–0	1–2							2–5	0–0	2–3	0–0	

Updated to match(es) played on December 12, 2010. Source: Soccerway
Legend: Blue = home team win; Yellow = draw; Red = away team win.

== Torneo Clausura ==
The Torneo Clausura will be the second and final tournament of the season. It began on January 16 and ended on May 15.

=== Standings ===
Pos	Team	Pld	W	D	L	GF	GA	GD	Pts	Qualification
1	Zamora	17	13	3	1	37	10	+27	42	Serie Final and the 2012 Copa Libertadores Second Stage
2	Caracas	17	12	2	3	32	12	+20	38	
3	Deportivo Anzoátegui	17	8	5	4	27	17	+10	29	
4	Mineros de Guayana	17	9	2	6	27	17	+10	29	
5	Real Esppor	17	8	4	5	16	13	+3	28	
6	Monagas	17	7	6	4	22	12	+10	27	
7	Deportivo Petare	17	7	6	4	21	14	+7	27	
8	Trujillanos	17	7	4	6	18	16	+2	25	
9	Carabobo	17	6	6	5	26	18	+8	24	
10	Aragua	17	6	6	5	16	13	+3	24	
11	Yaracuyanos	17	6	6	5	18	20	−2	24	
12	Atlético El Vigía	17	7	2	8	35	22	+13	23	
13	Deportivo Lara	17	6	5	6	24	19	+5	23	
14	Deportivo Táchira	17	6	2	9	22	21	+1	20	
15	Zulia	16	5	1	10	14	34	−20	16	
16	Estudiantes de Mérida	17	1	5	11	12	32	−20	8	
17	Caroní	16	1	4	11	9	44	−35	7	
18	Atlético Venezuela	17	2	1	14	8	50	−42	7	

Rules for classification: 1st points; 2nd goal difference; 3rd goals scored.

=== Results ===
Home \ Away	ARA	ATV	AVE	CBO	CRC	CRN	DAN	DLA	DPE	DTA	EME	MGU	MON	RES	TRU	YAR	ZAM	ZUL
Aragua		1–0			0–1	2–1	0–0						0–0	0–1	2–1	2–2	0–1	
Atlético El Vigía			4–0		1–0	3–0	1–1					1–3		1–0	0–2	3–1	0–3	5–1
Atlético Venezuela	0–1			1–5				0–4	0–2	3–2	3–0	0–3	0–2					
Carabobo	1–1	2–0			2–2				0–1	0–2	3–1	0–2	0–0					
Caracas			4–0			2–2	5–1	1–0						3–0	1–0	0–1	0–1	5–1
Caroní			0–0	1–3				0–3	0–3	2–1	1–1	0–2					0–1	– (Note: Match cancelled)
Deportivo Anzoátegui			10–0	1–1		2–1		2–1		1–0		1–0		2–1		0–1		1–0
Deportivo Lara	1–0	1–1		0–3					3–0	2–2	1–0	2–2	1–3					
Deportivo Petare	1–1	1–0			2–3		0–0				5–1		1–1		1–0		0–0	
Deportivo Táchira	3–1	3–1			0–1				1–2		3–1		1–0		1–0		1–2	
Estudiantes de Mérida	0–0	0–1			1–2		2–4						0–0		1–2	0–0	0–4	
Mineros de Guayana	0–1				0–1				2–1	1–0	1–1		1–0		3–1		3–1	
Monagas		3–1			0–1	4–0	1–0							1–0	1–1	4–1	1–3	
Real Esppor			1–0	1–0		3–0		0–0	0–0	2–2	1–0	3–2						1–0
Trujillanos			3–0	1–0		2–1	2–0	0–0						0–0		1–1		2–1
Yaracuyanos			2–0	1–1		0–0		1–4	1–1	1–0		2–1		1–2				2–0
Zamora			5–0	2–2			1–1	3–1						1–0	3–0	1–0		5–1
Zulia	0–4		2–1	1–3				1–0	1–0	1–0	1–3	2–1	1–1					

Updated to match(es) played on May 15, 2011. Source: Soccerway
Legend: Blue = home team win; Yellow = draw; Red = away team win.

== Aggregate table ==
Pos	Team	Pld	W	D	L	GF	GA	GD	Pts	Qualification or relegation
1	Caracas	34	23	4	7	56	27	+29	73	2012 Copa Libertadores First Stage
2	Real Esppor	34	19	7	8	46	23	+23	64	Qualified to the Serie Sudamericana
3	Deportivo Petare	34	16	12	6	46	31	+15	60	Qualified to the Serie Sudamericana
4	Deportivo Táchira	34	16	8	10	53	32	+21	56	2012 Copa Libertadores Second Stage (Note: Deportivo Táchira and Zamora are qualified for the 2011 Copa Libertadores Second Stage as the Apertura and Clausura champions, respectively.)
5	Zamora	34	16	8	10	53	40	+13	56	2012 Copa Libertadores Second Stage
6	Deportivo Anzoátegui	34	15	10	9	62	47	+15	55	Qualified to the Serie Sudamericana
7	Trujillanos	34	14	10	10	40	31	+9	52	2011 Copa Sudamericana Second Stage (Note: Trujillanos qualified to the 2011 Copa Sudamericana Second Stage as the 2010 Copa Venezuela champion.)
8	Aragua	34	14	10	10	38	33	+5	52	Qualified to the Serie Sudamericana
9	Yaracuyanos	34	12	14	8	36	38	−2	50	Qualified to the Serie Sudamericana
10	Mineros de Guayana	34	13	10	11	47	37	+10	49	Qualified to the Serie Sudamericana
11	Monagas	34	11	11	12	47	37	+10	44	Qualified to the Serie Sudamericana
12	Carabobo	34	9	13	12	41	39	+2	40	Qualified to the Serie Sudamericana
13	Deportivo Lara	34	9	12	13	46	48	−2	39	
14	Zulia	33	11	4	18	39	62	−23	37	
15	Atlético El Vigía	34	9	10	15	41	47	−6	37	
16	Estudiantes de Mérida	34	7	9	18	28	52	−24	30	
17	Atlético Venezuela	34	6	5	23	30	83	−53	23	Relegated to the Segunda División
18	Caroní	33	4	6	23	19	67	−48	18	Relegated to the Segunda División

Rules for classification: 1st points; 2nd goal difference; 3rd goals scored.

== Season top goalscorers ==
Rank	Player	Nationality	Club	Goals
1	Daniel Arismendi	Venezuelan	Deportivo Anzoátegui	19
2	Wilmar Jordán Gil	Colombian	Monagas	17
3	Marcelo Refresquini	Uruguayan	Atlético Venezuela/Yaracuyanos	13 ^{1}
4	Luis Carlos Cabezas	Colombian	Caracas	12
4	Jonathan Copete	Colombian	Zamora	12
4	Alejandro Guerra	Venezuelan	Deportivo Anzoátegui	12
4	Sergio Herrera	Colombian	Deportivo Táchira	12
8	Heiber Díaz	Venezuelan	Estudiantes de Mérida/Carabobo	11 ^{2}
8	Genlys Piñero	Venezuelan	Atlético El Vigía	11
10	Roberto Armúa	Argentine	Trujillanos	10

^{1} Refresquini scored 12 goals for Atlético Venezuela and 1 goal for Yaracuyanos.
^{2} Díaz scored 5 goals for Estudiantes de Mérida and 6 goals for Carabobo.

== Serie Final ==
Deportivo Táchira and Zamora qualified to the Serie Final, which was contested on a home and away basis.

Pos	Team	Pld	W	D	L	GF	GA	GD	Pts
1	Deportivo Táchira	2	1	1	0	1	0	+1	4
2	Zamora	2	0	1	1	0	1	−1	1

Rules for classification: 1st points; 2nd goals scored; 3rd away goals; 4th penalty shoot-out.
May 22, 2011
18:00 UTC−04:30

Zamora	0–1	Deportivo Táchira
	Report	Pérez Greco 40'

Estadio Agustín Tovar, Barinas
Attendance: 20,480
Referee: Giovanni Perluzzo (Sucre)

May 29, 2011
16:00 UTC−04:30

Deportivo Táchira	0–0	Zamora
	Report

Estadio Polideportivo de Pueblo Nuevo, San Cristóbal
Attendance: 37,789
Referee: José Luis Hoyos (Trujillo)

Primera División
2010–11 champion

7th title

== Serie Sudamericana ==
Other than the teams which already qualify for the Copa Libertadores (Apertura and Clausura champions and the best-placed team in the aggregate table) and the Copa Sudamericana (Copa Venezuela champion), the eight best-placed teams in the aggregate table will contest in the Serie Sudamericana for the remaining two berths to the Copa Sudamericana, which qualify the two winners to the First Stage.

In the first round, the matchups are:

- Match A (1 vs. 8)
- Match B (2 vs. 7)
- Match C (3 vs. 6)
- Match D (4 vs. 5)

In the second round, the matchups are:

- Winner A vs. Winner C
- Winner B vs. Winner D

For the two second round winners, the team with the better record in the aggregate table will receive the Venezuela 2 berth, while the other team will receive the Venezuela 3 berth.

=== First round ===
==== Match A ====
Pos	Team	Pld	W	D	L	GF	GA	GD	Pts	Qualification
1	Real Esppor	2	2	0	0	4	0	+4	6	Second Round
2	Carabobo	2	0	0	2	0	4	−4	0	

Rules for classification: 1st points; 2nd goals scored; 3rd away goals; 4th penalty shoot-out.
May 22, 2011
16:00 UTC−04:30

Carabobo	0–1	Real Esppor
	Report	Ortiz 61'

Estadio Misael Delgado, Valencia
Attendance: 7,762
Referee: Marlon Escalante (Táchira)

May 25, 2011
16:00 UTC−04:30

Real Esppor	3–0	Carabobo
Figueroa 2' (pen.); Manrique 58'; Castellín 82'	Report

Estadio Brígido Iriarte, Caracas
Referee: Rafael López (Cojedes)

==== Match B ====
Pos	Team	Pld	W	D	L	GF	GA	GD	Pts	Qualification
1	Deportivo Petare	2	1	0	1	3	2	+1	3	Second Round
2	Monagas	2	1	0	1	2	3	−1	3	

Rules for classification: 1st points; 2nd goals scored; 3rd away goals; 4th penalty shoot-out.
May 22, 2011
16:00 UTC−04:30

Monagas	2–0	Deportivo Petare
Gil 44' (pen.); Octavio 88'	Report

Estadio Monumental de Maturín, Maturín
Attendance: 2,906
Referee: Luis Márquez (Portuguesa)

May 25, 2011
19:30 UTC−04:30

Deportivo Petare	3–0	Monagas
Guazá 27'; Morales 49'; Sinisterra 73'	Report

Estadio Olímpico de la UCV, Caracas
Referee: Marlon Escalante (Táchira)

==== Match C ====
Pos	Team	Pld	W	D	L	GF	GA	GD	Pts	Qualification
1	Deportivo Anzoátegui	2	1	1	0	4	1	+3	4	Second Round
2	Mineros de Guayana	2	0	1	1	1	4	−3	1	

Rules for classification: 1st points; 2nd goals scored; 3rd away goals; 4th penalty shoot-out.
May 22, 2011
17:00 UTC−04:30

Mineros de Guayana	1–1	Deportivo Anzoátegui
González 78'	Report	Arismendi 55'

Polideportivo Cachamay, Puerto Ordaz
Attendance: 18,841
Referee: Rafael López (Cojedes)

May 25, 2011
19:00 UTC−04:30

Deportivo Anzoátegui	3–0	Mineros de Guayana
Guerra 13'; Arismendi 81', 90'	Report

Estadio José Antonio Anzoátegui, Puerto La Cruz
Referee: Giovanny Perluzzo (Monagas)

==== Match D ====
Pos	Team	Pld	W	D	L	GF	GA	GD	Pts	Qualification
1	Yaracuyanos	2	1	1	0	3	0	+3	4	Second Round
2	Aragua	2	0	1	1	0	3	−3	1	

Rules for classification: 1st points; 2nd goals scored; 3rd away goals; 4th penalty shoot-out.
May 22, 2011
16:00 UTC−04:30

Yaracuyanos	3–0	Aragua
Moreno 46'; Osorio 67'; Bolívar 78'	Report

Estadio Florentino Oropeza, San Felipe
Attendance: 3,226
Referee: Juan Soto (Distrito Capital)

May 25, 2011
16:00 UTC−04:30

Aragua	0–0	Yaracuyanos
	Report

Estadio Giuseppe Antonelli, Maracay
Referee: Mayker Gómez (Distrito Capital)

=== Second round ===
==== Winner A vs. Winner C ====
Pos	Team	Pld	W	D	L	GF	GA	GD	Pts	Qualification
1	Deportivo Anzoátegui	2	2	0	0	2	0	+2	6	2011 Copa Sudamericana First Stage
2	Real Esppor	2	0	0	2	0	2	−2	0	

Rules for classification: 1st points; 2nd goals scored; 3rd away goals; 4th penalty shoot-out.
May 29, 2011
17:00 UTC−04:30

Deportivo Anzoátegui	1–0	Real Esppor
Vizcarrondo 60'	Report

Estadio José Antonio Anzoátegui, Puerto La Cruz
Referee: José Argote (Zulia)

June 2, 2011
16:10 UTC−04:30

Real Esppor	0–1	Deportivo Anzoátegui
	Report	Arismendi 46'

Estadio Brígido Iriarte, Caracas
Referee: Luis Márquez (Portuguesa)

==== Winner B vs. Winner D ====
Pos	Team	Pld	W	D	L	GF	GA	GD	Pts	Qualification
1	Yaracuyanos	2	1	1	0	2	1	+1	4	2011 Copa Sudamericana First Stage
2	Deportivo Petare	2	0	1	1	1	2	−1	1	

Rules for classification: 1st points; 2nd goals scored; 3rd away goals; 4th penalty shoot-out.
May 29, 2011
16:00 UTC−04:30

Yaracuyanos	2–1	Deportivo Petare
Moreno 58'; Refresquini 67'	Report	Hernández 86'

Estadio Florentino Oropeza, San Felipe
Referee: Candelario Andarcia (Nueva Esparta)

June 1, 2011
19:30 UTC−04:30

Deportivo Petare	0–0	Yaracuyanos
	Report

Estadio Olímpico, Caracas
Referee: Rafael López (Cojedes)
