= Gerald Figeroux =

Trinidadian footballer (1943–2019)

Personal information
- Full name: Gerald Antonio Figeroux
- Date of birth: 23 May 1943
- Place of birth: Port of Spain, Trinidad and Tobago
- Date of death: 26 October 2019 (aged 76)
- Height: 1.93 m (6 ft 4 in)
- Position: Goalkeeper

Youth career
- Western Boys RC..

Senior career*
| Years | Team | Apps | (Gls) |
| 1964–1973 | Paragon | | |

International career
| 1969–1973 | Trinidad and Tobago | 11 | (0) |
| 1972 | CONCACAF | 0 | (0) |
Medal record
Men's football
Representing Trinidad and Tobago
CONCACAF Championship
| Silver medal – second place | 1973 Haiti | Team |
- * Club domestic league appearances and goals

Gerald Figeroux (23 May 1943 – 26 October 2019) is a retired Trinidadian footballer. Nicknamed "Figgy", he played for Paragon throughout the 1960s and the early 1970s. He also represented his native Trinidad and Tobago for the 1969, 1971 and 1973 CONCACAF Championships.

== Club career ==
Growing up with future Paragon teammate and Trinidad international Everald Cummings, the two initially played for Glory Guys until transferring to Paragon in 1964, winning that season's Port of Spain National League with Tony Govia mentoring Figeroux. In 1972, he played in a friendly against Brazilian club Santos with Figeroux being the only Trinidadian goalkeeper to face off against Pelé.

== International career ==
Figeroux was first called up in the 2–0 loss against Guatemala on 27 November during the 1969 CONCACAF Championship. He played in the following matches against Jamaica, Netherlands Antilles and Mexico with the Soca Warriors ending up in 5th place. The following 1971 CONCACAF Championship saw Figeroux serve as the goalkeeper in the draws against Honduras and Cuba as well as in the 0–2 loss against Mexico. He was also called up for the 1972 Brazil Independence Cup for a united CONCACAF side, serving as a reserve goalkeeper for Haitian goalkeeper Henri Françillon as the team was knocked out in the group stage. Despite playing in all three matches in the 1973 CONCACAF Championship qualifiers, he was relegated to a reserve goalkeeper with Kelvin Barclay becoming the new main goalkeeper as the Soca Warriors narrowly missed their World Cup debut.

== Honours ==
Trinidad and Tobago

- CONCACAF Championship : Runner-up, 1973

== Personal life ==
Figeroux died on 26 October 2019 from an undisclosed illness.
