= 2010 Copa Venezuela =

The 2010 Copa Venezuela was the 41st staging of the Copa Venezuela.

The competition started on August 25, 2010 and concluded on December 8, 2010 with a two leg final, in which Trujillanos FC won the trophy for the second time with a 0–0 draw at home and a 1–1 draw away over Zamora FC.

== First round ==
NB: Estrella Roja FC decline to take part.

The matches were played on 25–26 August 2010.

Team 1	Score	Team 2
UA Falcón	0-0; 2-4 (pen)	UA Maracaibo
Minasoro FC	0-1	Caroní FC
Pellícanos FC	3-2	Angostura FC
CALH FC	1-0	UA Piar FC
EC Guarani	0-1	Atl. Venezuela
Dvo Peñarol	1-1; 5-4 (pen)	Centro Ítalo FC
Lotería del Táchira	0-1	CD San Antonio
Hermandad Gallega	1-1; 4-3 (pen)	Portuguesa FC
UA San Antonio	2-2; 4-5 (pen)	Ureña FC
Dvo Apure	0-3	UA Aragua
Omega FC	0-1	Lara FC
Atl Cojedes	0-1	Llaneros de Guanare
Arroceros FC	1-1; 3-4 (pen)	Tucanes FC
La Victoria FC	0-2	UCV FC
Dvo Madeirense	2-4	Fund. Cesarger
Acad. Emeritense	awd	Real Bolívar FC

== Second round ==
The matches were played on 4–5 September 2010.

Team 1	Score	Team 2
CALH FC	0-9	Real Esppor
Dvo Peñarol	0-7	Yaracuyanos FC
UA Maracaibo	1-2	Trujillanos FC
Caroní FC	1-2	AC Mineros
Fund. Cesarger	1-1; 6-7 (pen)	Monagas SC
Pellícanos FC	0-2 (aet)	Dvo Anzoátegui
Atl. Venezuela	0-3	Dvo. Petare
UCV FC	1-3	Caracas FC
UA Aragua	2-3	Aragua FC
Tucanes FC	1-2 (aet)	Carabobo FC
Lara FC	2-0	Zulia FC
Real Bolívar FC	1-1; 6-5 (pen)	Atl. El Vigía FC
Hermandad Gallega	0-3	CD Lara
Llaneros de Guanare	0-2	Zamora FC
Ureña FC	1-4	Dvo. Táchira
CD San Antonio	2-0	Estudiantes FC

== Third round ==
The matches were played on 15 September–6 October 2010.

Team 1	Agg.	Team 2	1st leg	2nd leg
AC Mineros	2-0	Dvo. Petare	1-0	1-0
Real Esppor	1-3	Carabobo FC	1-1	0-2
Dvo Anzoátegui	2-1	Aragua FC	2-0	0-1
Real Bolívar FC	2-2 (a)	CD San Antonio	1-0	1-2
Yaracuyanos FC	1-2	CD Lara	1-1	0-1
Lara FC	2-3	Zamora FC	1-1	1-2
Trujillanos FC	3-1	Dvo. Táchira	3-1	0-0
Monagas SC	2-8	Caracas FC	1-6	1-2

== Quarterfinals ==
The matches were played on 8 October–3 November 2010.

Team 1	Agg.	Team 2	1st leg	2nd leg
AC Mineros	0-2	CD Lara	0-0	0-2
Dvo Anzoátegui	1-1 (a)	Trujillanos FC	1-1	0-0
Carabobo FC	6-3	Real Bolívar FC	4-0	2-3
Caracas FC	1-3	Zamora FC	1-2	0-1

== Semifinals ==
The matches were played on 10–24 November 2010.

Team 1	Agg.	Team 2	1st leg	2nd leg
CD Lara	3-4	Trujillanos FC	2-1	1-3
Zamora FC	1-1; 7-6 (pen)	Carabobo FC	1-0	0-1

== Finals ==
The matches were played on 1–8 December 2010.

Team 1	Agg.	Team 2	1st leg	2nd leg
Trujillanos FC	1-1 (a)	Zamora FC	0-0	1-1

Trujillanos FC qualify to Copa Sudamericana 2011.

== Topscorers ==
Player	Club	Goals
Heatkliff Castillo	Caracas FC	3
Dany Cure	Real Bolívar	3
Luis Cabezas (COL)	Caracas FC	3
Andrés Buelvas (COL)	Carabobo FC	3
Cristian Cásseres	Real Esppor	3
Daniel Arismendi	Dvo Anzoátegui	3
