= 1974–75 Honduran Liga Nacional =

Liga Nacional
- Season: 1974–75
- Champions: España (1st)
- Relegated: Atlético Indio
- CONCACAF Champions' Cup: España; Motagua
- Matches: 187
- Goals: 344 (1.84 per match)
- Top goalscorer: Rodríguez-Peña (15)

The 1973–74 Honduran Liga Nacional season was the 9th edition of the Honduran Liga Nacional. The format of the tournament consisted of a four round-robin schedule followed by a 4-team playoff round. C.D. España won the title after defeating C.D. Motagua in the final. Both teams qualified to the 1975 CONCACAF Champions' Cup.

== 1974–75 teams ==
- Atlético Indio (Tegucigalpa)
- C.D. Broncos (Choluteca)
- C.D. España (San Pedro Sula)
- C.D. Federal (Tegucigalpa, promoted)
- C.D. Marathón (San Pedro Sula)
- C.D. Motagua (Tegucigalpa)
- C.D. Olimpia (Tegucigalpa)
- C.D. Platense (Puerto Cortés)
- Universidad (Tegucigalpa)
- C.D.S. Vida (La Ceiba)

== Regular season ==
=== Standings ===
Pos	Team	Pld	W	D	L	GF	GA	GD	Pts	Qualification or relegation
1	Motagua (Note: Motagua clinched final spot as Regular season winner.)	36	18	15	3	44	19	+25	71	Qualified to the Final round (Note: Top 4 qualified to Final round.)
2	Olimpia	36	13	18	5	28	20	+8	67	Qualified to the Final round
3	España	36	12	15	9	44	36	+8	58	Qualified to the Final round
4	Marathón	36	13	14	9	36	26	+10	55	Qualified to the Final round
5	Platense	36	12	13	11	41	40	+1	52	
6	Broncos	36	11	12	13	28	31	−3	48	
7	Federal	36	11	10	15	33	38	−5	45	
8	Vida	36	6	16	14	25	41	−16	45	
9	Universidad	36	9	11	16	29	36	−7	43	
10	Atlético Indio	36	9	9	18	28	49	−21	38	Relegated to Segunda División (Note: Atlético Indio relegated.)

Notes:
- Draws were decided by penalty kicks on the first 9 rounds, 1 point for winner and 0 points for loser.
- Draws were decided by penalty kicks from round 10 to round 36, 2 points for winner and 1 point for loser.

== Final round ==
=== Cuadrangular ===
1 December 1974 Round 1	España	0–0 (5–4 p)	Motagua	San Pedro Sula, Cortés
(UTC−06:00)				Stadium: Estadio Francisco Morazán

1 December 1974 Round 1	Olimpia	2–0	Marathón	Tegucigalpa, Francisco Morazán
(UTC−06:00)	García; Gómez			Stadium: Estadio Tiburcio Carías Andino

8 December 1974 Round 2	Marathón	0–1	España	San Pedro Sula, Cortés
(UTC−06:00)				Stadium: Estadio Francisco Morazán

8 December 1974 Round 2	Motagua	0–1	Olimpia	Tegucigalpa, Francisco Morazán
(UTC−06:00)			Williams	Stadium: Estadio Tiburcio Carías Andino

15 December 1974 Round 3	España	1–0	Olimpia	San Pedro Sula, Cortés
(UTC−06:00)				Stadium: Estadio Francisco Morazán

15 December 1974 Round 3	Motagua	1–1 (?–? p)	Marathón	Tegucigalpa, Francisco Morazán
(UTC−06:00)				Stadium: Estadio Tiburcio Carías Andino
Note: Marathón won by penalty shoot-outs, score missing.

=== Cuadrangular standings ===
Pos	Team	Pld	W	D	L	GF	GA	GD	Pts	Qualification or relegation
1	España	3	2	1	0	3	1	+2	8	Qualified to the Final (Note: Cuadrangular won by España and clinched final spot.)
2	Olimpia	3	2	0	1	4	2	+2	6	
3	Motagua	3	0	2	1	1	2	−1	2	
4	Marathón	3	0	1	2	1	4	−3	2	

Notes:
- Draws were decided by penalty kicks, 2 points for winner and 1 point for loser.

=== Final ===
22 December 1974 Final	Motagua	0–1	España	Tegucigalpa
15:00 CST	Starting XI (GK) Mayorga; Durón; Quilter; Banegas; Zelaya; Godoy; Guifarro; Obando; Hernández; Blandón; (substituted off) Sosa; Substitutes; (substituted on) Bernárdez Coach; Padilla (HON)		84' Pavón Starting XI; Arrieta (GK); Álvarez; Villegas; Consany; Dávila; Pavón; Yearwood; Castro; Bailey (substituted off); Echeverría (substituted off); Ferreira; Substitutes; Ortega (substituted on); Rodríguez (substituted on); Coach (HON) Herrera	Stadium: Estadio Tiburcio Carías Andino; Attendance: 14,000; Referee: Porfirio Guerra
Note: Played in a single match.

Liga Nacional
1974–75 Champion
C.D. España
1st title

== Top scorer ==
- (Chile) Rubén Rodríguez (Platense) with 15 goals

== Squads ==
Atlético Indio
(Honduras) Amílcar "Verde" Aceituno	(Honduras) Víctor Hugo Álvarez	(Honduras) Luis Brand
(Honduras) Ramón Antonio "Pilín" Brand	(Honduras) Marco Antonio Calderón	(Honduras) Ricardo Calona
(Honduras) Pedro "Poquitito" Carbajal	(Honduras) Miguel Angel Escalante	(Honduras) Jorge "Cruz Azul" Escoto
(Honduras) "Yuyuga" Flores	(Honduras) Joaquín Enrique "Quicón" Fonseca	(Honduras) Francisco "Panchón" Guerra
(Chile) Alfonso "Garrincha" Gutiérrez	(Honduras) Marco Tulio "Coyol" López	(Honduras) Joaquín "Alianza" Maldonado
(Honduras) Carlos Arturo Matute	(Honduras) David Levy McCalla	(Honduras) Aquiles Mendoza
(Honduras) Héctor "Yeto" Montoya	(Honduras) Oscar Nolasco	(Honduras) Roy Posas
(Honduras) Orlando "Calavera" Rodríguez	(Brazil) Expedito Serafín	(Honduras) Jorge Sierra
(Honduras) Edgardo Sosa	(Honduras) Ramón Ugarte	(Honduras) José Armando Ayala
Broncos
(Honduras) Wilfredo Caballero	(Honduras) Wilson Fernández Da Silva	(Honduras) Hernán Santiago "Cortés" García Martínez
(Honduras) Jorge Alberto "Perro" Gonzáles	(Honduras) Marco Tulio Gonzales	(Honduras) Javier "el Uno" Rodríguez
(Honduras) Jacobo Sarmiento	(Honduras) Jose Boanerges Villalobos Moreno
Real España
(Honduras) Mauricio "Mozambique" Alvarez	(Costa Rica) Carlos Luis "Macho" Arrieta	(Honduras) Julio César "El Tile" Arzú
(Honduras) Jimmy James Bailey	(Honduras) Julio Campos	(Honduras) José Edelmín "Pando" Castro
(Brazil) Carlos Roberto Consany	(Honduras) Dagoberto Cubero	(Honduras) César Augusto Dávila Puerto
(Honduras) Arnulfo Echeverría	(Brazil) Alberto Ferreira da Silva	(Honduras) Adalberto "Chino" Menjívar
(Honduras) José Estanislao "Tanayo" Ortega	(Honduras) Antonio "Gato" Pavón Molina	(Honduras) José López "Rulo" Paz
(Brazil) Washington Pereira	(Honduras) Gil Josué Rodríguez	(Honduras) Jaime Villegas
(Honduras) Gilberto Gerónimo Yearwood
Federal
(Honduras) Ramón Bustillo	(Honduras) Roberto "Toto" Cáceres	(Brazil) Pedro Caetano Da Silva
(Chile) Arturo del Carmen Díaz	(Honduras) Dagoberto Espinal	(Costa Rica) Leroy Foster
(Chile) Alfonso "Garrincha" Gutiérrez	(Honduras) Gustavo Izaguirre	(Honduras) Carlos Arturo Matute
(Honduras) Julio Meza	(Honduras) Manuel "Micobrinco" Rodríguez	(Colombia) Oscar Teherán
(Honduras) Domingo "Yuyo" Tróchez	(Honduras) Orlando "Bimbo" Vásquez	(Honduras) Francisco Zelaya Pastrana
Marathón
(Honduras) Rafael Argeñal	(Honduras) Mauro "Nayo" Caballero	(Uruguay) Miguel Angel "Pianito" Castro
(Brazil) Linauro Di Paula	(Honduras) Julio César "Cucaracha" Fonseca	(Honduras) Exequiel "Estupiñán" García
(Honduras) Luis Alonso Guzmán Velásquez	(Honduras) Alberto Mancía	(Honduras) Wilfredo Medina
(Costa Rica) Allard Plummer	(Argentina) Daniel Argelio Romero	(Honduras) Arturo Torres "Pacharaca" Bonilla
(Honduras) Allan Ricardo Young
Motagua
(Honduras) Marcos Banegas	(Honduras) Mario Blandón "Tanque" Artica	(Honduras) José Luis Cruz Figueroa
(Nicaragua) Salvador Dubois Leiva	(Honduras) José María "Chema" Durón	(Honduras) Mariano Godoy
(Honduras) Rubén "Chamaco" Guifarro	(Honduras) Óscar Rolando "Martillo" Hernández	(Nicaragua) Roger Mayorga
(Honduras) Angel Antonio "Toño" Obando	(Honduras) Ronald Quilter	(Honduras) Rigoberto Sosa
(Honduras) Francisco "Pantera" Velásquez	(Honduras) Arnaldo "Chuluyo" Zelaya	(Honduras) Héctor "Lin" Zelaya
Olimpia
(Honduras) Dennis Allen	(Honduras) Selvin Cárcamo	(Honduras) Egdomilio "Milo" Díaz
(Honduras) Óscar García	(Honduras) Rigoberto "Shula" Gómez	(Honduras) Alfredo Hawit Banegas
(Honduras) Miguel Angel "Shinola" Matamoros	(Honduras) Reynaldo Mejía Ortega	(Honduras) Marco Antonio "Tonín" Mendoza
(Honduras) Ángel Ramón "Mon" Paz	(Honduras) Manuel "Candado" Williams	(Honduras) Samuel Sentini
Platense
(Honduras) Alejandro Aguirre	(Honduras) Carlos "Care" Alvarado	(Honduras) Neptaly Argeñal
(Honduras) Rafael Argeñal	(Honduras) Eduardo Castillo	(Honduras) Martín Castillo
(Honduras) "Cacique" Castro	(Honduras) "Rigo" Castro	(Honduras) Ricardo Castro
(Honduras) Jhony Chavarría	(Honduras) Arturo Coto	(Honduras) Tomás Cedricks Ewens "Quito" Wagner
(Honduras) "Cuco" Flores	(Honduras) Manuel de Jesús Fuentes	(Honduras) "Toro" Garay
(Honduras) Rossvelth Garbut	(Honduras) "Che" Guerrero	(Honduras) Juan Noyola
(Honduras) Mario Ortega	(Honduras) Arturo Payne	(Colombia) Oscar Piedrahíta
(Honduras) Roberto Rich	(Honduras) Samuel Rivera	(Chile) Rubén Rodríguez Peña Llantén
(Honduras) Jimmy Steward
Universidad
(Uruguay) Santos "Cocodrilo" González	(Honduras) Roger Macedo	(Honduras) David Levy McCalla
(Honduras) Ramón "Mon" Medina	(Honduras) José Salomón "Turco" Nazzar	(Honduras) Ricardo Nuila
(Honduras) Daniel "Diablo" Sambulá	(Honduras) Roberto Virgilio Santos
Vida
(Honduras) Óscar "Burra" Acosta	(Honduras) César "Cesarín" Aguirre	(Honduras) Carlos Humberto Alvarado Osorto
(Honduras) Manuel Bernárdez Calderón	(Honduras) Peter Buchanan	(Honduras) Jorge Caballero
(Guatemala) Jesús Octavio Cifuentes	(Honduras) Gustavo Adolfo "Gorcha" Collins	(Honduras) Zacarías "Frijolito" Collins
(Honduras) Juan David	(Honduras) Fredy Delgado	(Honduras) Arturo "Junia" Garden
(Honduras) Morris Garden	(Honduras) Ramón Neptally "Liebre" Guardado	(Honduras) Dennis "Bomba" Hinds
(Honduras) Mario McKoy	(Honduras) Matilde Selím Lacayo	(Honduras) Jairo López
(Honduras) José López "Rulo" Paz	(Honduras) Tomás "Tommy" Marshall	(Honduras) Enrique "Palanca" Mendoza
(Honduras) Mario Murillo	(Honduras) Hermenegildo Orellana	(Honduras) Marco Antonio Marcos Peña
(Honduras) Jorge Peralta	(Honduras) Wilfredo "Wil" Rodríguez	(Honduras) José María "Chema" Salinas
(Honduras) Vicente Suazo	(Honduras) Antonio "Danto" Urbina	(Honduras) Edgardo Williams
(Honduras) Osman Zelaya

== Known results ==
=== Round 1 ===
27 January 1974	Vida	0–1	Motagua	La Ceiba
CST			Sosa	Stadium: Estadio Nilmo Edwards

27 January 1974	España	3–2	Federal	San Pedro Sula
CST	Echeverría			Stadium: Estadio General Francisco Morazán

27 January 1974	Marathón	2–1	Platense	San Pedro Sula
CST				Stadium: Estadio General Francisco Morazán

27 January 1974	Universidad	0–2	Broncos	Tegucigalpa
CST				Stadium: Estadio Tiburcio Carías Andino

27 January 1974	Olimpia	0–0	Atlético Indio	Tegucigalpa
CST				Stadium: Estadio Tiburcio Carías Andino

=== Round 7 ===
	Olimpia	0–2	Vida
CST

=== Round 12 ===
28 April 1974	Marathón	2–1	Motagua	San Pedro Sula
	Plummer; Caballero		Hernández	Stadium: Estadio General Francisco Morazán

=== Unknown rounds ===
3 February 1974	Broncos	0–0	Olimpia	Choluteca
CST				Stadium: Estadio Fausto Flores Lagos

3 February 1974	Platense	0–0	España	Puerto Cortés
CST				Stadium: Estadio Excélsior

3 February 1974	Universidad	3–2	Vida	Tegucigalpa
CST				Stadium: Estadio Tiburcio Carías Andino

3 February 1974	Motagua	3–1	Atlético Indio	Tegucigalpa
CST	Obando; Hernández			Stadium: Estadio Tiburcio Carías Andino

10 February 1974	España	2–2 (4–3 p)	Motagua	San Pedro Sula
CST	Obando			Stadium: Estadio General Francisco Morazán

17 February 1974	Motagua	2–1	Broncos
CST	Obando; Hernández		Berríos

24 February 1974	Motagua	v	Platense
CST	Obando

17 March 1974	Motagua	v	Universidad
CST	Obando

31 March 1974	España	1–0	Broncos	San Pedro Sula; Tegucigalpa
CST	Bailey			Stadium: Estadio General Francisco Morazán; Estadio Tiburcio Carías Andino; Referee: Rolando Núñez
Note: Suspended at 45' (1–0) in San Pedro Sula on 17 March due to crowd trouble. Remaining 45 minutes were resumed on 31 March at Tegucigalpa. Result stood.

31 March 1974	Marathón	0–0	Olimpia	Tegucigalpa
CST				Stadium: Estadio Tiburcio Carías Andino; Referee: Carlos Cedillos
Note: Game rescheduled from 17 March due to crowd trouble at San Pedro Sula.

12 May 1974	Vida	1–2	Platense
CST

7 July 1974	Motagua	1–1 (1–2 p)	España	Tegucigalpa
CST	Obando			Stadium: Estadio Tiburcio Carías Andino

21 July 1974	Broncos	1–1	Universidad	Choluteca
CST				Stadium: Estadio Fausto Flores Lagos

28 July 1974	España	1–2	Platense
CST

4 August 1974	Platense	1–1	Motagua
CST

11 August 1974	Platense	2–2	Olimpia
CST

18 August 1974	Platense	1–1	Universidad
CST

18 August 1974	Motagua	v	Olimpia	Tegucigalpa
CST	Obando			Stadium: Estadio Tiburcio Carías Andino

25 August 1974	Platense	1–0	Vida
CST

25 August 1974	Motagua	0–0 (?–? p)	España	Tegucigalpa
CST				Stadium: Estadio Tiburcio Carías Andino
Note: España won by penalty shoot-outs, score missing.

1 September 1974	Platense	2–0	Broncos
CST

8 September 1974	Atlético Indio	0–3	Platense
CST

12 September 1974	Motagua	v	Broncos
CST	Obando

15 September 1974	Platense	2–1	Federal
CST

15 September 1974	Vida	0–3	España	La Ceiba
CST				Stadium: Estadio Nilmo Edwards

6 October 1974	Motagua	v	Vida
CST	Obando

20 October 1974	Federal	Awarded	Marathón	Tegucigalpa
CST	Meza			Stadium: Estadio Tiburcio Carías Andino

20 October 1974	España	0–0 (3–4 p)	Motagua	San Pedro Sula
CST				Stadium: Estadio General Francisco Morazán

31 October 1974	Motagua	v	Atlético Indio	Tegucigalpa
CST	Obando			Stadium: Estadio Tiburcio Carías Andino

10 November 1974	Atlético Indio	2–1	Federal
CST	Montoya		Bustillo

	España	3–0	Vida	San Pedro Sula
CST				Stadium: Estadio General Francisco Morazán

	Vida	0–1	Federal	La Ceiba
CST				Stadium: Estadio Nilmo Edwards

	Universidad	1–0	Motagua	Tegucigalpa
CST	McCalla			Stadium: Estadio Tiburcio Carías Andino

	Federal	0–1	Vida
CST

	Olimpia	0–0	Broncos
CST

	Olimpia	0–0	Universidad
CST

	Olimpia	2–1	Platense
CST

	Olimpia	0–0	España
CST

	Olimpia	0–0	Motagua
CST

== Controversy ==
- According to the regulations of the competition, the final series (enforced for the first time this season) were supposed to be played in a home and away format. However, after C.D. España defeated C.D. Motagua 0–1 in the first leg, they traveled back to San Pedro Sula claiming the title and went on to celebrate in front of their fan base, thus misunderstanding the newly implemented rules. Motagua's president Pedro Atala Simón in order to avoid further conflicts, desisted in playing the second leg and granted the title which at that time represented the first championship to España and to the city of San Pedro Sula itself.
