= Ernesto Ramírez =

Honduran footballer (born 1952)

Personal information
- Full name: Ernesto Ramírez Lara
- Date of birth: 1951 (age 74–75)
- Place of birth: San Pedro Sula, Cortés, Honduras
- Position: Defender

Senior career*
Years	Team	Apps	(Gls)
1973–1977	Real España		(2)

International career
1972–1973	Honduras	1	(0)
- * Club domestic league appearances and goals

Ernesto "Tractor" Ramírez Lara (born 1951) is a retired Honduran footballer. He played for Real España throughout the 1970s, winning three titles with the club in their historic run. He also briefly represented Honduras for the 1973 CONCACAF Championship

== Club career ==
Despite playing for the club since the early 1970s, it wouldn't be until the 1974–75 Honduran Liga Nacional where the Aurinegros won their first domestic title. This success was immediately repeated in the following 1975–76 and 1976–77 Honduran Liga Nacional tournaments, becoming the first Honduran club to achieve three consecutive titles.

== International career ==
Ramírez's only appearance in international football to represent Honduras came through in the 1973 CONCACAF Championship. Initially a substitute, he made his only appearance in a 1–1 draw against Guatemala with Honduras ultimately not qualifying for the 1974 FIFA World Cup.

== Later life ==
Ramírez attended the 50th anniversary of the club's victory at the 1974–75 season alongside many of his former teammates.
