= Russell Tesheira =

Trinidadian footballer (1951–2004)

Personal information
- Full name: Russell Tesheira
- Date of birth: 24 March 1951
- Place of birth: Port of Spain, Trinidad and Tobago
- Date of death: 13 April 2004 (aged 53)
- Place of death: San Fernando, Trinidad and Tobago
- Position: Defender

Youth career
- Saint Mary's College

Senior career*
Years	Team	Apps	(Gls)
c. 1971–1977	Malvern		

International career
1971–1976	Trinidad and Tobago	14	(0)
Medal record
Men's football
Representing Trinidad and Tobago
CONCACAF Championship
Silver medal – second place	1973 Haiti	Team
- * Club domestic league appearances and goals

Russell Tesheira (24 March 1951 – 13 April 2004) was a Trinidadian footballer. Nicknamed "Tesh", he played as a defender for Malvern throughout the 1970s. He also represented his native Trinidad and Tobago for the 1971 and 1973 CONCACAF Championships.

== Club career ==
His entire club career was spent playing for Malvern throughout the 1970s. His greatest achievement throughout his club career was winning Footballer of the Year in 1977.

== International career ==
Tesheira was first called up to play for Trinidad and Tobago for the 1971 CONCACAF Championship in the 1–1 draw against Honduras. He was later involved in the controversial campaign at the following 1973 CONCACAF Championship where the Soca Warriors nearly qualified for the 1974 FIFA World Cup. His final appearances were at the 1977 CONCACAF Championship qualifier with his final appearance being at the loss against Suriname who qualified instead.

== Personal life ==
In 2004, Tesheira was warded for a prostate medical procedure at the Gulf View Medical Centre in San Fernando where he would later die on 13 April that same year. Following his death, his wife Karen Nunez-Tesheira attempted to seek $20 million in compensation for medical negligence in 2010 with the case later being dismissed two years later.

== Honours ==
Trinidad and Tobago

- CONCACAF Championship : Runner-up, 1973
