= Devenish Paul =

Trinidadian footballer (1948–2025)

Devonish Paul
Personal information
- Full name: Devenish Paul
- Date of birth: 16 December 1948
- Place of birth: Couva, Couva–Tabaquite–Talparo, Trinidad and Tobago
- Date of death: 27 April 2025 (aged 76)
- Height: 1.80 m (5 ft 11 in)
- Position: Goalkeeper

Youth career
- Fyzabad Intermediate

Senior career*
Years	Team	Apps	(Gls)
c. 1973	Forest Reserve		
- Apex
- Petroleum Development

International career
1973–1975	Trinidad and Tobago	0	(0)
Medal record
Men's football
Representing Trinidad and Tobago
CONCACAF Championship
Silver medal – second place	1973 Haiti	Team
- * Club domestic league appearances and goals

Devenish Paul (16 December 1948 – 2 April 2025) was a Trinidadian footballer. Nicknamed "Finey", he played as a goalkeeper for Forest Reserve throughout the early 1970s. He also represented his native Trinidad and Tobago for the 1973 CONCACAF Championship.

== International career ==
Paul was called up to represent the Classic team for the 1973 CONCACAF Championship but primarily served as a reserve goalkeeper throughout the tournament.

== Later life ==
Alongside former footballer Brent Sancho, Paul helped promote Central's first ever home fixture for the 2012–13 TT Pro League, wanting to promote football within his home city of Couva. Paul later died on 2 April 2025.

== Honours ==
Trinidad and Tobago

- CONCACAF Championship : Runner-up, 1973
