= Kelvin Barclay =

Trinidadian footballer (born 1945)

Kevin Barclay
Personal information
- Full name: Kelvin Malcolm Barclay
- Date of birth: 26 February 1945 (age 81)
- Place of birth: Woodbrook, Port of Spain, Trinidad and Tobago
- Position: Goalkeeper

Senior career*
Years	Team	Apps	(Gls)
???–1973	Malvern		
1974	Los Angeles Aztecs	3	(0)
1974	Washington Diplomats	8	(0)
1975–??	TESCA		

International career
1972–1976	Trinidad and Tobago	10	(0)
Medal record
Men's football
Representing Trinidad and Tobago
CONCACAF Championship
Silver medal – second place	1973 Haiti	Team
- * Club domestic league appearances and goals

Kelvin Malcolm Barclay (born 26 February 1945) is a retired Trinidadian footballer. He played as a goalkeeper for Malvern in his native Trinidad and played abroad in the North American Soccer League for the Los Angeles Aztecs and the Washington Diplomats. He also represented Trinidad and Tobago for the 1973 CONCACAF Championship.

== Club career ==
Throughout the early 1970s, he played for Malvern. However, he caught the interest of Los Angeles Aztecs manager Alex Perolli and signed him to play three games throughout the season until Perolli signed in Mexican goalkeeper Blas Sánchez. This resulted in Barclay being transferred to the Washington Diplomats where he made 8 more appearances. Following his return from the United States, he played for TESCA for the remainder of his career.

== International career ==
Barclay was first called up for the 11–1 thrashing against Antigua and Barbuda on 10 November 1972. This success would lead Trinidad manager Kevin Verity to make Barclay the main goalkeeper for all five matches of the tournament. He notably served as the goalkeeper in the 1–0 victory against Guatemala and the 4–0 beatings against Mexico and Netherlands Antilles. However, the controversial match against hosts Haiti which had many annulled goals from the refereeing would lead to the Soca Warriors to miss their possible debut at the 1974 FIFA World Cup. Barclay was still present after the defeat however, participating in the 1977 CONCACAF Championship qualifiers where Trinidad would fail to qualify after losing their decisive away match against Suriname.

== Honours ==
Trinidad and Tobago

- CONCACAF Championship : Runner-up, 1973
