= Dave Verity =

English footballer

Personal information
- Full name: David Anthony Verity
- Date of birth: 21 September 1949 (age 77)
- Place of birth: Halifax, England
- Position: Midfielder

Youth career
- 19xx–1966: Scunthorpe United

Senior career*
Years	Team	Apps	(Gls)
1966–1968	Scunthorpe United	5	(0)
1968–1973	Halifax Town	78	(5)
1971–1972	Drogheda United (loan)		
1973–1976	Yeovil Town		
1976–1983	Salisbury		
1983–????	Andover		

Managerial career
- 1981-1983: Salisbury
- * Club domestic league appearances and goals

David Anthony Verity (born 21 September 1949) is an English former footballer who played as a midfielder.

== Career ==
Verity began his career with Scunthorpe United, making 5 appearances in the Football League between 1966 and 1969. He later played for Halifax Town, scoring 5 goals in 78 League appearances over 4 years.

In January 1971 Verity along with three Halifax teammates signed for Drogheda United on loan. He played in the 1971 FAI Cup Final which Drogheda lost after a replay. After leaving Halifax in 1973, Verity played moved into non-League football with Yeovil Town. In 1976 he moved to Salisbury, where he became player-manager in 1981. Two years, later, he moved to Andover.

== Personal life ==
His brother Kevin was also a professional footballer.

== Sources ==
- Brian Whelan (2010). DUFC: A Claret and Blue History.
