= Mauricio Álvarez =

Honduran footballer (1948–2026)

Personal information
- Full name: Plutarco Mauricio Alvarez
- Date of birth: June 28, 1948
- Place of birth: Triunfo de la Cruz, Atlántida, Honduras
- Date of death: February 6, 2026 (aged 77)
- Place of death: New York City, New York, U.S.
- Position: Defender

Senior career*
Years	Team	Apps	(Gls)
1970–1979	Real España		

International career
1973	Honduras	3	(0)
- * Club domestic league appearances and goals

Mauricio Plutarco Álvarez (28 June 1948 – 3 February 2026) was a Honduran footballer. Nicknamed "Mozambique", he played as a defender for Real España throughout the 1970s. He also represented Honduras internationally for the 1973 CONCACAF Championship.

== Club career ==
Álvarez began playing for Real España for the 1973–74 Honduran Liga Nacional. Despite his debut season ending in an average 4th place, the following 1974–75 and 1975–76 Honduran Liga Nacional were both winning seasons for the club with Álvarez firmly establishing himself in the Starting XI in the club. Notably, Álvarez had grown so popular within the club to where during a match, Álvarez was booked for rough play but the referee accidentally used his nickname in place of his actual name, causing him to not get sent off on technicality.

== International career ==
Álvarez was first called up to represent Honduras in the 2–1 victory over Trinidad and Tobago on 29 November 1973. He then appeared surprise 1–1 draw against Mexico on 3 December 1973 as well as in the 1–0 loss against Haiti on 7 December 1973 with Honduras ultimately not qualifying for the 1974 FIFA World Cup.

== Personal life ==
Álvarez later emigrated to the United States before dying in New York City on 6 February 2026.
