= Edgar Bolaños =

Guatemalan footballer

Personal information
- Date of birth: 20 February 1951 (age 75)
- Position: Midfielder

International career
| Years | Team | Apps | (Gls) |
- Guatemala

Edgar Bolaños (born 20 February 1951) is a Guatemalan former footballer. He competed in the men's tournament at the 1976 Summer Olympics.
