= Estanislao Ortega =

Honduran footballer (born 1950)

Personal information
- Full name: José Estanislao Ortega
- Date of birth: 16 November 1950 (age 75)
- Place of birth: Macuelizo, Santa Bárbara, Honduras
- Position: Midfielder

Senior career*
Years	Team	Apps	(Gls)
1967–1972	Olimpia		
1972–1979	Real España		
1979–1981	Atlético Morazán		
- * Club domestic league appearances and goals

José Estanislao Ortega (born 16 November 1950) is a retired Honduran footballer. Nicknamed "Tanayo", he played as a midfielder for Olimpia and Real España throughout the late 1960s and 1970s. He also represented Honduras internationally for the 1973 CONCACAF Championship.

== Club career ==
Defined through his finesse, wide vision of the field and dribbling, Ortega made his senior debut for Olimpia at the age of 17 for the 1967–68 Honduran Liga Nacional. That season saw Ortega shine as despite his age, he contributed to the club earning their second title that season. This success continued into the early 1970s as he also won the 1969–70 and 1971–72 Honduran Liga Nacional titles as he was part of the club's golden generation alongside other players such as Samuel Sentini, Jorge Urquía, Miguel Ángel Matamoros, Jorge Bran, Rigoberto Gómez, René Rodríguez and Donaldo Rosales. However, due to an injury in his final season with Olimpia, manager Mario Grifin chose to sell him to Real España after their manager, Chelato Uclés took interest in him. He then played within the Starting XI throughout his entire career with the club and was notably part of the squad that won the three consecutive titles at the 1974–75, 1975–76 and 1976–77 Honduran Liga Nacional. He spent the remainder of his career with Atlético Morazán throughout the early 1980s before retiring following the 1980–81 Honduran Liga Nacional.

== International career ==
Ortega was first called up to represent Honduras at the 1973 CONCACAF Championship qualifiers in the matches against Costa Rica with the team narrowly making it to the subsequent 1973 CONCACAF Championship. He was also called up for the final Honduran roster for their international debut at the 1982 FIFA World Cup but Atlético Morazán president and Honduran Army colonel Amílcar Zelaya declined to release Ortega, causing him to miss out the tournament.
