= Marcelo Refresquini =

Uruguayan footballer (born 1980)

Marcelo Refresquini (born September 28, 1980 in Montevideo, Uruguay) is a Uruguayan footballer who plays for Atlético Venezuela of the Primera División in Venezuela.

== Teams ==
- (Uruguay) Cerro 2001-2003
- (Uruguay) Basañez 2003
- (Uruguay) Cerro 2004-2005
- (Colombia) Cúcuta Deportivo 2005
- (Guatemala) Deportivo Heredia 2006
- (Colombia) Unión Magdalena 2006-2007
- (Ecuador) Manta 2007
- (Venezuela) Aragua Fútbol Club 2007-2008
- (Venezuela) Carabobo Fútbol Club 2008
- (Venezuela) Estrella Roja 2009
- (Venezuela) Unión Atlético San Antonio 2009
- Atlético Venezuela 2010–present

== Titles ==
- (Colombia) Cúcuta Deportivo 2005 (Primera B Colombiana)
- Atlético Venezuela 2010 (Segunda División Venezolana)
