= Dany Cure =

Venezuelan footballer (born 1990)

Personal information
- Full name: Dany Cure
- Date of birth: 7 April 1990 (age 36)
- Place of birth: Machiques, Venezuela
- Height: 1.81 m (5 ft 11 1/2 in)
- Position: Winger

Youth career
- –2008: Zulia

Senior career*
Years	Team	Apps	(Gls)
2008–2010	Zulia	4	(0)
2011–2012	Llaneros	42	(7)
2012–2015	Caracas	67	(7)
2015	Carabobo	16	(3)
2016–2017	Once Caldas	45	(2)
2017	Rionegro Águilas	10	(0)
2018–2020	Zulia	32	(8)
2019–2020	→ The Strongest (loan)	22	(4)
2020	→ Central Córdoba (loan)	5	(1)
2020	→ Boston River (loan)	1	(0)
2021	Deportivo La Guaira	16	(3)
2022	Portuguesa	13	(0)

International career^{‡}
2014	Venezuela	1	(0)
- * Club domestic league appearances and goals as of 01:54, 3 January 2021 (UTC) ‡ National team caps and goals as of 25 October 2014

Dany Cure (born 7 April 1990) is a Venezuelan footballer as a midfielder Previously, he played for Caracas FC as well as Carabobo FC.
