= Caroní F.C. =

Venezuelan football club

- Founded: 2009
- Ground: Polideportivo Cachamay
- Capacity: 41,600
Home colours	Away colours

Caroní FC is a professional football club based in Ciudad Guayana, Venezuela. It was founded in 2009 and played in the Venezuelan 1st division in 2010–11 but finished in last position and were relegated. They play at the Polideportivo Cachamay.
