= Rigoberto Sosa =

Honduran footballer (born 1950)

Reynaldo Mejía
Personal information
- Full name: Reynaldo Mejía Ortega
- Date of birth: 12 January 1950
- Place of birth: Tegucigalpa, Francisco Morazán, Honduras
- Date of death: 27 March 1993 (aged 43)
- Position: Forward

Senior career*
Years	Team	Apps	(Gls)
1973–1981	Motagua	160	(9)

International career
1973	Honduras	1	(1)
- * Club domestic league appearances and goals

Rigoberto Sosa López (12 January 1950 – 27 March 1993) was a Honduran footballer. He played as a forward for Motagua throughout the 1970s, winning several titles with the club. He also represented Honduras internationally for the 1973 CONCACAF Championship.

== Club career ==
Sosa made his debut for Motagua during the 1973–74 Honduran Liga Nacional with his debut season seeing Sosa win the tournament. He remained with the club throughout the remainder of the 1970s and into the early 1980s, also winning the 1978–79 Honduran Liga Nacional. That same season saw Sosa score the equalizer in the heavily contested match between them and club rivals Olimpia.

== International career ==
Sosa made his only international appearance in the 1973 CONCACAF Championship, holding the distinguished title of being the first goalscorer in the 2–2 draw against Netherlands Antilles on 12 December 1973.
