= Kevin Verity =

English footballer and manager

Personal information
- Full name: Kevin Patrick Verity
- Date of birth: 16 March 1940 (age 86)
- Place of birth: Halifax, West Yorkshire, England
- Position: Right winger

Youth career
- 19xx–1958: Halifax Town

Senior career*
Years	Team	Apps	(Gls)
1958–1960	Halifax Town	13	(6)
1960–19xx	Ilkeston Town		

Managerial career
- 1972–1973: Trinidad and Tobago
- 1984–1988: England C
Medal record
Men's football
Representing Trinidad and Tobago (as manager)
CONCACAF Championship
Runner-up	1973 Haiti
- * Club domestic league appearances and goals

Kevin Patrick Verity (born 16 March 1940) is an English former football player and manager.

== Playing career ==
Born in Halifax, West Yorkshire, Verity played as a right winger and began his career at Halifax Town, scoring 6 goals in 13 appearances in the Football League between 1958 and 1960. He later played non-League football with Ilkeston Town.

== Coaching career ==
Verity was manager of the Trinidad and Tobago national team between November 1972 and December 1973.

He became manager of the England C team in December 1984, resigning in November 1988 due to his other commitments with the Football Association.

== Personal life ==
His brother Dave was also a professional footballer.

== Honours ==
=== Manager ===
Trinidad and Tobago

- CONCACAF Championship : Runner-up, 1973
