= 1987–88 Honduran Liga Nacional =

Liga Nacional
- Season: 1987–88
- Champions: Olimpia (9th)
- Relegated: E.A.C.I.
- CONCACAF Champions' Cup: Olimpia; Marathón
- Matches: 158
- Goals: 304 (1.92 per match)
- Top goalscorer: Machado (19)

The 1987–88 Honduran Liga Nacional season was the 22nd edition of the Honduran Liga Nacional. The format of the tournament consisted of two groups of five followed by a 5-team playoff round. Club Deportivo Olimpia successfully defended its 1986–87 title in the final against runner-up C.D. Marathón. Both teams qualified for berths to the 1988 CONCACAF Champions' Cup.

== 1987–88 teams ==
- E.A.C.I. (Isletas)
- Marathón (San Pedro Sula)
- Motagua (Tegucigalpa)
- Olimpia (Tegucigalpa)
- Platense (Puerto Cortés)
- Real España (San Pedro Sula)
- Sula (La Lima)
- Universidad (Tegucigalpa, promoted)
- Victoria (La Ceiba)
- Vida (La Ceiba)
- Platense played its home games at Estadio Francisco Morazán due to renovations to Estadio Excélsior.
- E.A.C.I. is from Isletas but played in Olanchito.

== Regular season ==
=== Standings Group A ===
Pos	Team	Pld	W	D	L	GF	GA	GD	Pts	Qualification or relegation
1	Marathón (Note: Marathón clinched Final spot as regular season winner.)	27	15	8	4	44	24	+20	38	Qualified to the Final round (Note: Marathón, Olimpia and Victoria qualified to the Final round.)
2	Olimpia	27	11	10	6	32	21	+11	32 (Note: Extra match between Olimpia and Victoria required to decide second place.)	Qualified to the Final round
3	Victoria	27	10	12	5	26	23	+3	32	Qualified to the Final round
4	Platense	27	5	12	10	18	25	−7	22	
5	E.A.C.I.	27	3	10	14	16	33	−17	16	Relegated to Segunda División (Note: E.A.C.I. relegated to second division.)

=== Standings Group B ===
Pos	Team	Pld	W	D	L	GF	GA	GD	Pts	Qualification or relegation
1	Real España	27	13	9	5	33	19	+14	35	Qualified to the Final round (Note: Real España and Sula qualified to the Final round.)
2	Sula	27	6	16	5	22	18	+4	28	Qualified to the Final round
3	Motagua	27	9	8	10	32	37	−5	26	
4	Vida	27	6	9	12	23	33	−10	21	
5	Universidad	27	4	12	11	23	36	−13	20	

=== 2nd Place playoff ===
November 1987 Replay	Victoria	2–0	Olimpia

== Final round ==
=== Pentagonal standings ===
Pos	Team	Pld	W	D	L	GF	GA	GD	Pts	Qualification or relegation
1	Olimpia	8	4	3	1	12	5	+7	11	Qualified to the Final (Note: Olimpia qualified to Final as Pentagonal winner.)
2	Real España	8	3	3	2	6	7	−1	9	
3	Sula	8	2	4	2	2	2	0	8	
4	Marathón	8	3	1	4	8	6	+2	7	
5	Victoria	8	1	3	4	4	12	−8	5	

=== Final ===
20 December 1987 1st leg	Olimpia	0–0	Marathón	Tegucigalpa, Francisco Morazán
				Stadium: Estadio Tiburcio Carías Andino

23 December 1987 2nd leg	Marathón	0–1	Olimpia	San Pedro Sula, Cortés
			86' Espinoza	Stadium: Estadio Francisco Morazán

Marathón	Olimpia

GK	–	(Honduras) Erasmo Guerrero
RB	–	(Honduras) Pastor Martínez
CB	–	(Honduras) Aparicio Colón
CB	–	(Honduras) Herminio Villalobos
LB	–	(Honduras) Óscar Bardales
CM	–	(Costa Rica) Jorge Chévez
DM	–	(Honduras) Marco García
CM	–	(Honduras) Richardson Smith
AM	–	(Honduras) Leonel Machado
CF	–	(Honduras) Eduardo Laing
CF	–	(Honduras) Ciro Castillo
Manager:
(Honduras) José Herrera

GK	–	(Honduras) Óscar Banegas
RB	–	(Honduras) Daniel Zapata
CB	–	(Honduras) Alejandro Ruíz
CB	–	(Honduras) Patrocinio Sierra
LM	–	(Honduras) Raúl Martínez Sambulá
DM	–	(Honduras) Erick Fú
CM	–	(Brazil) Eduardo Santana
CM	–	(Honduras) Juan Carlos Espinoza
RW	–	(Uruguay) José Mario Figueroa
CF	–	(Honduras) Juan Flores
LW	–	(Honduras) Eugenio Flores
Manager:
(Honduras) Carlos Padilla

- Olimpia won 1–0 on aggregate.

== Top scorer ==
- (Honduras) Gilberto Leonel Machado (Marathón) with 19 goals

== Squads ==
E.A.C.I.
(Honduras) Miguel Angel "Payasito" Gómez	(Honduras) Geovany Rodríguez	(Honduras) Rony Galeas
(Honduras) Lincoln Gustavo Alemán	(Honduras) Juan Alberto "Ninja" Padilla Bardales	(Honduras) José Betancourt
(Honduras) Luis García	(Honduras) Omar "Carguero" Renderos	(Honduras) Luis Azaneth Ortiz
(Honduras) Jorge Sierra	(Honduras) Raul David Fúnez	(Honduras) Edgar Murillo
(Honduras) Jorge Sánchez	(Honduras) Víctor Hugo Salgado	(Honduras) Alirio Posas
(Honduras) Ernesto Isaula	(Honduras) Héctor Beltrán	(Honduras) Roger Omar "Maisón" Rosales
(Honduras) Héctor Manuel Posantes	(Honduras) César Galindo	(Honduras) Jorge Meléndez
(Honduras) Tedy Lozano	(Honduras) Cándido Luis "Cubillo" García	(Honduras) Celio Sánchez
(Honduras) Rafael "Sietío" Torres Castro	(Honduras) Ramón Edgardo Moradel Zapata
(Honduras) Oscar Santiago "Tigre" Carbajal	(Honduras) Walter Baca Plummer
Marathón
(Honduras) Erasmo "Chícharo" Guerrero	(Honduras) Gilberto Leonel Machado García	(Honduras) Javier Toledo
(Honduras) Pedro Midence	(Honduras) Suamy Álvarez	(Honduras) José Luis "Joche" Alvarado
(Honduras) Amílcar Lanza	(Honduras) Roy Arturo Padilla Bardales	(Honduras) Jorge Alberto "Cuca" Bueso Iglesias
(Honduras) Rodolfo Richardson Smith	(Honduras) Herminio Villalobos	(Honduras) Marco "Tono" García
(Honduras) Pedro Geovany Midence	(Honduras) Francisco Adelmo Herrera	(Costa Rica) Fredy Méndez
(Honduras) Samuel Figueroa	(Honduras) Tomás Róchez	(Argentina) Luis Oswaldo "Che" Altamirano
(Costa Rica) Jorge Chévez	(Honduras) Fernando Figueroa	(Honduras) Pastor Martínez
(Honduras) Ciro Paulino "Palic" Castillo	(Honduras) Eduardo Laing	(Honduras) Aparicio Colón
(Honduras) Óscar "Moro" Bardales	(Honduras) Efraín "Pucho" Osorio
Motagua
(Honduras) Orlin Banegas	(Brazil) Carneiro Da Silva	(Honduras) Amílcar Leonel Suazo
(Honduras) Juan Gómez Ortiz	(Honduras) José Mario "Kivo" Almendárez	(Honduras) Eugenio Meléndez
(Honduras) Isidro Arriola	(Honduras) Victor Manuel "Pechito" Zelaya	(Brazil) Robson de Moura
(Honduras) Manuel "Meme" Chavarria	(Honduras) Oscar "Sapo" Hernandez	(Honduras) Dennis Ponce
(Brazil) Jorge Nunes	(Honduras) Celeo "Chimpilin" Herrera	(Honduras) Arnold López
(Brazil) Salvador Filo	(Honduras) Marco Tulio "Pollo" Suazo	(Honduras) Oscar Murillo
Olimpia
(Honduras) Óscar Banegas	(Honduras) Fernando Tovar Durón	(Honduras) Raúl Martínez Sambulá
(Honduras) José Antonio "Flaco" Hernández	(Honduras) Alejandro "Indio" Ruiz	(Honduras) Eugenio Dolmo Flores
(Uruguay) Vicente Daniel Viera	(Brazil) Eduardo Santana	(Honduras) Carlos "Gigio" Maldonado
(Honduras) Patrocinio Sierra	(Uruguay) José Mario "Chueco" Figueroa	(Honduras) Juan Carlos Espinoza
(Honduras) Daniel Zapata	(Honduras) Juan Alberto Flores Maradiaga	(Honduras) Erick Darío Fú Lanza
(Honduras) Juan Flores	(Honduras) Danilo Galindo	(Uruguay) Julio Franco
(Honduras) Javier Flores	(Honduras) Juan Cruz Murillo	(Honduras) Osman Madrid
Platense
(Honduras) Jimmy Steward	(Honduras) Arturo Johnson	(Honduras) Armando López "Babalaba" Bodden
(Honduras) Héctor Javier Flores	(Honduras) Jorge Arita Neals	(Honduras) Raúl Centeno Gamboa
(Argentina) Carlos Luján	(Honduras) Carlos Aguilar Bonilla
Real España
(Honduras) Julio César "El Tile" Arzú	(Honduras) Wilmer Enrique "Supermán" Cruz	(Honduras) José Mauricio "Guicho" Fúnez Barrientos
(Honduras) Karl Antonio Roland	(Honduras) Marco Antonio Anariba Zepeda	(Honduras) Gilberto Gerónimo Yearwood
(Honduras) Junior Rashford Costly	(Honduras) Edith Hernando Contreras	(Honduras) Miguel Antonio "Hino" Mathews
(Honduras) Juan Ramón "Montuca" Castro	(Honduras) Nelson Benavídez	(Honduras) Esteban Pitío Centeno
(Honduras) Edgardo Emilson Soto Fajardo	(Honduras) Javier Chavarría	(Brazil) Edimar Luiz Marques
(Honduras) Nahúm Alberto Espinoza Zerón	(Honduras) Carlos Orlando Caballero
Sula
(Honduras) Belarmino Rivera	(Honduras) Marcos Lacayo	(Honduras) Óscar "Tigre" Carbajal
(Honduras) Hernán Santiago "Cortes" García Martínez	(Honduras) Luis Alonso Zúniga	(Honduras) Danilo "Pilo" Henríquez
(Honduras) Marco Adolfo "Choreta" Ordóñez	(Honduras) Fernando Nuila	(Honduras) Dennis Caballero
(Honduras) Óscar "Pito Loco" López	(Honduras) Antonio "Machangay" Amaya López	(Honduras) Marco Antonio Gómez
(Honduras) Catarino Amaya	(Honduras) José Manuel Enamorado Díaz	(Honduras) Mario Bustillo
(Honduras) Héctor Caballero	(Honduras) Edgardo "Caco" Reyes	(Honduras) Rigoberto Castillo
(Honduras) Jorge Fidel "Gringo" Romero	(Honduras) Orlando Pineda	(Honduras) José Luis "Pili" Aguirre
Universidad
(Honduras) Juan Jerezano	(Honduras) José Luis Cruz Figueroa	(Honduras) Roberto "Chele" Barahona
(Honduras) Fraterno Calderón	(Honduras) Carlos "Carlón" Martínez	(Honduras) Moisés "Tanque" Velázquez
(Honduras) Juan Jose Craniotis	(Honduras) Olvin Elvir	(Argentina) Oswaldo "Che" Altamirano
Victoria
(Honduras) Jorge Alberto "Camioncito" Duarte	(Honduras) Jorge Alberto "Bala" Bennett	(Honduras) José Manuel Vaquedano
(Honduras) Renán "Chimbo" Aguilera Contreras	(Honduras) Carlos Roberto "Condorito" Mejía Alvarenga	(Honduras) Miguel Angel "Primitivo" Ortiz
(Honduras) Ramón Berckling
Vida
(Honduras) Carlos Ramírez	(Honduras) Wilson Omar Reyes Martínez	(Honduras) Rolando "Pipo" Valladares Laguna
(Honduras) Marvin Geovany "Mango" Henríquez	(Honduras) José Emilio Martínez	(Honduras) Marco Tulio "Zocadito" Zelaya
(Honduras) Óscar Escobar

== Known results ==
=== Round 1 ===
Sula	1–1	Marathón
Amaya

Victoria	1–0	Olimpia

La Ceiba
22 March 1987

Motagua	1–2	Marathón
		Machado

Tegucigalpa

=== Round 2 ===
Olimpia	0–1	Universidad

Tegucigalpa

=== Third place playoff ===
Olimpia	0–2	Victoria

=== Pentagonal ===
11 November 1987

Real España	1–0	Marathón
Yearwood

San Pedro Sula
21 November 1987

Marathón	2–1	Olimpia

San Pedro Sula
26 November 1987

Olimpia	0–0	Real España

Tegucigalpa
2 December 1987

Marathón	0–1	Real España
		Chavarría

San Pedro Sula
6 December 1987

Victoria	0–0	Sula

La Ceiba
6 December 1987

Real España	1–4	Olimpia
Cálix		Espinoza; J. Flores; J. A. Flores

San Pedro Sula
10 December 1987

Olimpia	2–1	Marathón

Tegucigalpa

Real España	1–2	Victoria

San Pedro Sula

Real España	1–0	Sula

San Pedro Sula

Marathón	0–0	Victoria

San Pedro Sula

=== Unknown rounds ===
25 March 1987

Real España	1–0	Olimpia

San Pedro Sula
4 April 1987

Marathón	4–1	Vida
Machado

La Ceiba
26 April 1987

Vida	6–2	Motagua
Zelaya; Dueñas; García; Williams		Núnez; Almendárez

La Ceiba
20 May 1987

Sula	5–1	Vida

San Pedro Sula
21 May 1987

Olimpia	3–0	Victoria
D. Flores; J. Flores; Figueroa

Tegucigalpa
9 August 1987

Olimpia	1–0	Real España
Viera

Tegucigalpa
29 August 1987

Marathón	3–1	Platense
Laing		Luján

San Pedro Sula
27 September 1987

Olimpia	2–3	Marathón
		Machado; Lanza

Tegucigalpa
25 October 1987

Motagua	1–1	Sula
		90+' Nuila

Tegucigalpa
Referee: José Fuentes
28 October 1987

Marathón	4–0	Universidad

March 1987

Real España	1–0	Sula
Costly

Olimpia	1–1	Marathón

Tegucigalpa

Marathón	1–1	Olimpia

San Pedro Sula

E.A.C.I.	2–2	Vida

Motagua	0–1	Real España

Platense	1–1	Marathón

Universidad	3–1	Olimpia

Victoria	1–0	Sula

Real España	2–0	Platense

Marathón	1–0	E.A.C.I.

Universidad	3–0	Motagua

Vida	0–0	Sula

E.A.C.I.	1–2	Olimpia

Motagua	4–2	Sula

Platense	0–0	Vida

Universidad	1–0	Marathón

Victoria	1–1	Real España

Real España	0–0	Vida

Marathón	1–1	Platense
Machado

Olimpia	1–0	Universidad

Sula	2–0	E.A.C.I.

Victoria	0–0	Motagua

E.A.C.I.	1–1	Universidad

Real España	3–1	Platense

Marathón	2–0	Vida

Sula	2–2	Motagua

Victoria	0–0	Olimpia

Real España	3–2	Universidad

Platense	0–0	Motagua

Victoria	1–0	E.A.C.I.

Vida	1–1	Sula
