= List of Honduran Liga Nacional top scorers =

The following is a list of the highest goalscorers in Liga Nacional de Fútbol de Honduras' history.

== List of goalscorers ==
- From 2012–13 the total of goals added from Apertura and Clausura tournaments to define one goalscorer.

| Season | Player | Club | Goals |
|---|---|---|---|
| 1965–66 | (Honduras) Henry Grey | La Salle | 14 |
| 1966–67 | (Honduras) Mauro Caballero | Marathón | 12 |
| 1967–68 | (Honduras) Junia Garden | Vida | 13 |
| 1968–69 | (Brazil) Roberto Abrussezze | Motagua | 16 |
| 1969–70 | (Brazil) Flavio Ortega | Marathón | 18 |
| 1970–71 | (Honduras) Carlos Alvarado | Vida | 16 |
| 1971–72 | (Honduras) Carlos Alvarado | Vida | 14 |
| 1972–73 | None; season canceled | | |
| 1973–74 | (Honduras) Mario Blandón | Motagua | 13 |
| 1973–74 | (Costa Rica) Allard Plummer | Marathón | 13 |
| 1974–75 | (Chile) Rubén Rodríguez-Peña | Platense | 15 |
| 1975–76 | (Honduras) Marco López | Olimpia | 11 |
| 1976–77 | (Honduras) Óscar Hernández | Marathón | 10 |
| 1977–78 | (Chile) Mario Iubini | Motagua | 10 |
| 1978–79 | (Honduras) Salvador Bernárdez | Motagua | 15 |
| 1979–80 | (Honduras) Prudencio Norales | Olimpia | 15 |
| 1980–81 | (Argentina) Luis Altamirano | Broncos | 13 |
| 1981–82 | (Argentina) Luis Altamirano | Broncos | 15 |
| 1982–83 | (Argentina) Luis Altamirano | Broncos UNAH | 13 |
| 1983–84 | (Honduras) Raúl Gamboa | Platense | 17 |
| 1984–85 | (Argentina) Luis Altamirano | Universidad | 13 |
| 1985–86 | (Honduras) Juan Flores | Olimpia | 9 |
| 1986–87 | (Honduras) Cipriano Dueñas | Vida | 12 |
| 1987–88 | (Honduras) Gilberto Machado | Marathón | 19 |
| 1988–89 | (Honduras) Miguel Matthews | Motagua | 8 |
| 1988–89 | (Uruguay) Rubén Alonso | Real España | 8 |
| 1988–89 | (Honduras) Carlos Lobo | Curacao | 8 |
| 1988–89 | (Honduras) Raúl Gamboa | Platense | 8 |
| 1989–90 | (Honduras) Álex Ávila | Real España | 13 |
| 1990–91 | (Honduras) Luis Vallejo | Real España | 12 |
| 1991–92 | (Honduras) Eduardo Bennett | Olimpia | 12 |
| 1992–93 | (Honduras) Jorge Arriola | Real Maya | 18 |
| 1993–94 | (Honduras) Alex Chacón | Olimpia | 12 |
| 1994–95 | (Honduras) Álex Ávila | Motagua | 14 |
| 1995–96 | (Honduras) Edwin Castro | Motagua | 14 |
| 1996–97 | (Brazil) Denilson Costa | Motagua | 13 |
| 1997–98 A | (Honduras) Wilmer Velásquez | Olimpia | 19 |
| 1997–98 C | (Honduras) Amado Guevara | Motagua | 15 |
| 1997–98 C | (Honduras) Wilmer Velásquez | Olimpia | 15 |
| 1998–99 | (Brazil) Marcio de Lima | Platense | 11 |
| 1999–00 A | (Honduras) Wilmer Velásquez | Olimpia | 12 |
| 1999–00 C | (Honduras) Juan Cárcamo | Platense | 14 |
| 2000–01 A | (Argentina) Marcelo Verón | Platense | 13 |
| 2000–01 C | (Honduras) Pompilio Cacho | Marathón | 12 |
| 2001–02 A | (Honduras) Enrique Reneau | Marathón | 8 |
| 2001–02 C | (Brazil) Marcelo Ferreira | Platense | 13 |
| 2002–03 A | (Brazil) Marcelo Ferreira | Platense | 15 |
| 2002–03 C | (Brazil) Denilson Costa | Marathón | 10 |
| 2002–03 C | (Honduras) Pompilio Cacho | Marathón | 10 |
| 2002–03 C | (Brazil) Luciano Emílio | Real España | 10 |
| 2003–04 A | (Argentina) Danilo Tosello | Olimpia | 12 |
| 2003–04 C | (Brazil) Luciano Emílio | Real España | 14 |
| 2004–05 A | (Brazil) Luciano Emílio | Olimpia | 16 |
| 2004–05 C | (Honduras) Francisco Ramírez | Platense | 10 |
| 2005–06 A | (Honduras) Francisco Ramírez | Platense | 13 |
| 2005–06 C | (Brazil) Luciano Emílio | Olimpia | 12 |
| 2006–07 A | (Honduras) Carlo Costly | Platense | 10 |
| 2006–07 C | (Honduras) Carlos Pavón | Real España | 15 |
| 2007–08 A | (Honduras) Emil Martínez | Marathón | 10 |
| 2007–08 C | (Honduras) Wilmer Velásquez | Olimpia | 10 |
| 2008–09 A | (Brazil) Everaldo Ferreira | Real España | 13 |
| 2008–09 C | (Argentina) Sergio Diduch | Hispano | 10 |
| 2009–10 A | (Honduras) Jerry Palacios | Marathón | 13 |
| 2009–10 C | (Honduras) Jerry Bengtson | Vida | 13 |
| 2010–11 A | (Honduras) Jerry Bengtson | Vida | 12 |
| 2010–11 C | (Honduras) Jerry Bengtson | Motagua | 15 |
| 2011–12 A | (Uruguay) Claudio Cardozo | Marathón | 15 |
| 2011–12 C | (Uruguay) Óscar Torlacoff | Atlético Choloma | 9 |
| 2011–12 C | (Colombia) Andrés Copete | Victoria | 9 |
| 2012–13 | (Honduras) Roger Rojas | Olimpia | 19 |
| 2013–14 | (Honduras) Rony Martínez | Real Sociedad | 24 |
| 2014–15 | (Honduras) Román Castillo | Motagua | 29 |
| 2015–16 | (Honduras) Marco Vega | Real Sociedad | 24 |
| 2016–17 | (Honduras) Rony Martínez | Real Sociedad | 22 |
| 2017–18 | (Colombia) Justin Arboleda | Marathón | 24 |
| 2018–19 | (Honduras) Jerry Bengtson | Olimpia | 24 |

== By club ==
| Club | Titles |
|---|---|
| Olimpia | 14 |
| Marathón | 13 |
| Platense | 11 |
| Motagua | 11 |
| Real España | 7 |
| Vida | 6 |
| Real Sociedad | 3 |
| Broncos | 2 |
| Universidad / Broncos UNAH | 2 |
| La Salle | 1 |
| Curacao | 1 |
| Real Maya | 1 |
| Hispano | 1 |
| Atlético Choloma | 1 |
| Victoria | 1 |
