= 1985–86 Honduran Liga Nacional =

Liga Nacional
- Season: 1985–86
- Champions: Marathón (2nd)
- Relegated: Universidad
- CONCACAF Champions' Cup: Marathón; Motagua
- Matches: 104
- Goals: 186 (1.79 per match)
- Top goalscorer: Flores (9)

The 1985–86 Honduran Liga Nacional season was the 20th edition of the Honduran Liga Nacional. The format of the tournament consisted of two groups of five followed by a 4-team playoff round. C.D. Marathón won the title after winning the final round and qualified to the 1986 CONCACAF Champions' Cup along with C.D. Motagua.

== 1985–86 teams ==
- Juventud de Sula (La Lima)
- Marathón (San Pedro Sula)
- Motagua (Tegucigalpa)
- Olimpia (Tegucigalpa)
- Platense (Puerto Cortés)
- Real España (San Pedro Sula)
- Tela Timsa (Tela, promoted)
- Universidad (Tegucigalpa)
- Victoria (La Ceiba)
- Vida (La Ceiba)

== Regular season ==
=== Standings Group A ===
Pos	Team	Pld	W	D	L	GF	GA	GD	Pts	Qualification or relegation
1	Olimpia	18	8	7	3	20	11	+9	23	Qualified to the Final round (Note: Olimpia and Marathón qualified to the Final round.)
2	Marathón	18	8	7	3	23	15	+8	23	Qualified to the Final round
3	Platense	18	4	10	4	15	16	−1	18	
4	Victoria	18	5	7	6	11	14	−3	17	
5	Tela Timsa	18	5	4	9	12	20	−8	14	Relegation playoff (Note: Tela Timsa forced to play a relegation playoff against last place from Group B.)

=== Standings Group B ===
Pos	Team	Pld	W	D	L	GF	GA	GD	Pts	Qualification or relegation
1	Vida	18	7	8	3	24	12	+12	22	Qualified to the Final round (Note: Vida and Motagua qualified to the Final round.)
2	Motagua	18	5	9	4	12	17	−5	19	Qualified to the Final round
3	Real España	18	5	7	6	22	20	+2	17	
4	Juventud de Sula	18	4	7	7	10	16	−6	15	
5	Universidad	18	4	4	10	13	22	−9	12	Relegation playoff (Note: Universidad forced to play a relegation playoff against last place from Group A.)

== Final round ==
=== Cuadrangular standings ===
Pos	Team	Pld	W	D	L	GF	GA	GD	Pts
1	Marathón (Note: Marathón declared champions as winner of cuadrangular.)	6	4	1	1	7	5	+2	9
2	Vida	6	3	1	2	6	4	+2	7
3	Motagua	6	2	2	2	6	6	0	6
4	Olimpia	6	0	2	4	4	8	−4	2

=== Results ===
Home \ Away	MAR	MOT	OLI	VID
Marathón	—	2–1	1–1	1–0
Motagua	2–0	—	2–1	0–0
Olimpia	0–1	1–1	—	0–1
Vida	1–2	2–0	2–1	—

Updated to match(es) played on unknown. Source:
Legend: Blue = home team win; Yellow = draw; Red = away team win.
For upcoming matches, an "a" indicates there is an article about the rivalry between the two participants.

=== Relegation playoff ===
1st leg	Universidad	0–0	Tela Timsa	Tegucigalpa, Francisco Morazán
CST				Stadium: Estadio Tiburcio Carías Andino

2nd leg	Tela Timsa	1–0	Universidad	Tela, Atlántida
CST				Stadium: Estadio León Gómez

- Universidad relegated to second division.

== Top scorer ==
- (Honduras) Juan Flores (Olimpia) with 9 goals

== Squads ==
Juventud de Sula
(Honduras) Marco Antonio "Machaca" Soriano	(Honduras) Jorge Hibrán Maldonado	(Honduras) Ramón Edgardo Moradel Zapata
(Honduras) José Manuel Enamorado Díaz	(Honduras) Julián Núñez	(Honduras) Pedro Manzanares
(Honduras) Celso Fredy Güity	(Honduras) Antonio "Machangay" Amaya	(Honduras) Jimmy Stewart
Marathón
(Honduras) Erasmo "Chícharo" Guerrero	(Honduras) Francisco Adelmo Herrera	(Honduras) Óscar "Moro" Bardales
(Honduras) Ciro Paulino "Palic" Castillo	(Honduras) Pastor Martínez	(Honduras) Vicente Suazo
(Honduras) Herminio Villalobos	(Honduras) Osmán Madrid	(Honduras) Suamy Álvarez
(Honduras) David Ponce	(Honduras) Norman Lobo	(Honduras) Gilberto Leonel Machado García
(Honduras) Amílcar Lanza	(Honduras) Erasmo Castillo	(Honduras) Jorge Alberto "Cuca" Bueso Iglesias
(Honduras) Rodolfo Richardson Smith	(Honduras) José Luis "Joche" Alvarado	(Honduras) Roy Arturo Padilla Bardales
(Honduras) Árnold Vladimir López	(Honduras) Oswaldo Zaldívar	(Honduras) Juan Contreras
(Honduras) Aparicio Colón	(Honduras) Jorge Martínez	(Honduras) Miguel Lanza
(Honduras) Mario "El Chino" Romero	(Honduras) Nicolas "Nico" Suazo	(Honduras) Roy Padilla Bardales
(Honduras) Marco "Tono" García	(Honduras) Delio Billonay Fajardo
(Honduras) Árnold López	(Honduras) Pablo Madrid
Motagua
(Honduras) José Luis Cruz Figueroa	(Honduras) Juan Gómez Ortiz	(Honduras) Marco Tulio "Pollo" Suazo
(Honduras) Amílcar Leonel Suazo	(Honduras) Oscar Medina	(Argentina) Luis Oswaldo "Che" Altamirano
(Honduras) Antonio "Toño" Obando	(Honduras) Frank Ponce	(Honduras) Eber Ramírez
(Honduras) Luis Cruz	(Honduras) Isidro Arriola	(Honduras) Orlin Banegas
(Honduras) Antonio Obando	(Honduras) Olvin Elvir	(Honduras) Reynaldo Colon
(Honduras) Ernesto "Neto" Isaula	(Honduras) Karl Benneth	(Honduras) Moisés "Tanque" Velasquez
(Honduras) roberto "Muñiña" Escalante
Olimpia
(Honduras) Raúl Martínez Sambulá	(Honduras) Juan Alberto Flores Maradiaga	(Honduras) Jorge Alberto "Perro" González
(Honduras) José Emilio Martínez	(Honduras) Fernando Tovar Durón	(Honduras) Roberto Reynaldo "Robot" Bailey Sargent
(Honduras) Juan Carlos Espinoza	(Honduras) Carlos "Gigio" Maldonado	(Honduras) Roger Javier Valladares
(Honduras) Óscar Banegas	(Honduras) Juan Ramón Soler	(Honduras) Osman Madrid
(Honduras) Antonio "Flaco" Hernández	(Honduras) Francisco "Pancho" González	(Honduras) Dario Mejía
(Honduras) Prudencio "Tecate" Norales
Platense
(Honduras) Manuel Zúniga	(Honduras) Juan Jerezano	(Honduras) Jorge Arita Neals
(Honduras) Wilfredo Brown	(Honduras) Tomás Centeno López	(Honduras) Iván Chavarría
(Honduras) Luis Núñez	(Honduras) Carlos Deras	(Honduras) Eleázar Peña
(Honduras) Noé Meza	(Honduras) Florentino Arriola	(Honduras) Mauro Rivas
(Honduras) Hever Miranda	(Honduras) Ramón Cruz Colíndrez	(Honduras) Domingo Drummond
(Honduras) Pedro Alvarez	(Honduras) Marco Antonio Valdez	(Honduras) Oscar Claros
(Honduras) Guillermo Bernárdez	(Honduras) Carlos Zavala	(Honduras) Armando López "Babalaba" Bodden
(Honduras) Eugenio Dolmo Flores	(Honduras) Obdulio Vásquez	(Honduras) Leo Assís
(Honduras) Armando Rivera	(Honduras) German "Niño" Bernárdez	(Honduras) Gerald Vargas Droumond
(Honduras) Raúl Centeno Gamboa	(Honduras) Luis Rodríguez	(Honduras) Juan Ramón Palacios
(Honduras) Jorge Irías	(Honduras) Martín García	(Honduras) Eduardo Gámez
(Honduras) Carlos Velásquez	(Honduras) Juan "Nito" Anariba	(Honduras) Carlos Aguilar
(Honduras) Eduardo Laing	(Honduras) Gerardo "Coco" Urbina	(Honduras) German Guzmán
Real España
(Honduras) José Mauricio "Guicho" Fúnez	(Honduras) Wilmer "Supermán" Cruz	(Honduras) Karl Antonio Roland
(Honduras) Esteban Centeno Pitillo	(Honduras) Luis Laing	(Honduras) Junior Rashford Costly
(Honduras) Manuel Fuentes López	(Honduras) Carlos Orlando Caballero	(Honduras) Óscar Machigua
(Honduras) Jaime Villegas	(Honduras) Luis Fuentes	(Honduras) José Ramos
(Honduras) Arnaldo Herrera	(Honduras) Pedro Castro	(Honduras) Nelson Benavídez
(Honduras) Hernán Santiago "Cortés" García Martínez	(Honduras) Edgardo Emilson Soto Fajardo	(Honduras) Marco "Maco" Antonio Anariba
(Honduras) Jimmy Steward	(Honduras) Nahúm Alberto Espinoza	(Honduras) Edith Hernando "Tibombo" Contreras
(Honduras) Miguel Antonio "Hino" Mathews	(Honduras) Moisés "El Chafa" Barahona	(Honduras) Juan Manuel "Nito" Anariba
(Honduras) Clinton Campbell	(Honduras) Ildefonso Bonilla	(Honduras) Álex Geovany Ávila
(Honduras) Pablo Orellana
Tela Timsa
(Honduras) Julio César "El Tile" Arzú	(Honduras) Raúl David Fúnez	(Honduras) Jimmy James Bailey
(Honduras) Francisco Javier Toledo	(Honduras) Víctor Hugo Salgado	(Honduras) Luis "Gavilán" Cálix
(Honduras) Carlos Acosta	(Honduras) Carlos Flores	(Honduras) Mario Coto
(Honduras) Allan Anthony Costly	(Honduras) Noel Omar "Carguero" Renderos	(Honduras) Gustavo Cálix
(Honduras) Salvador "Vayoy" Martínez	(Honduras) Víctor Laboriel
Universidad
(Honduras) José Omar Macedo	(Honduras) José Marcial "Canelo" Murillo	(Honduras) Antonio Aguilar
(Honduras) Olman Flores	(Honduras) Osorto	(Honduras) Samuel Armijo
(Honduras) Salomón Nazzar	(Honduras) Hector Orlando Ortega	(Honduras) Iván Canales
(Honduras) Roberto "Chele" Barahona	(Honduras) Víctor Romero	(Honduras) Jorge Montenegro
Victoria
(Honduras) Jorge Alberto "Camioncito" Duarte	(Honduras) Luis Azneth Ortiz	(Honduras) Miguel Angel "Primitivo" Ortiz
(Honduras) Ramón Berckling	(Honduras) José Manuel Vaquedano	(Honduras) David Goff
Vida
(Honduras) Marvin Geovany "Mango" Henríquez	(Honduras) Wilson Omar Reyes Martínez	(Honduras) Juan Dolmo "Juanito" Arzú
(Honduras) Carlos Humberto "Papeto" Lobo	(Honduras) Ramón "Pollo" Calderón	(Honduras) Oscar Escobar
(Honduras) Rolando "Pipo" Valladares Laguna	(Honduras) Natividad Morales Barrios	(Honduras) Matilde Selím Lacayo
(Honduras) Rudy Alberto Williams	(Honduras) Marco Tulio "Zocadito" Zelaya

== Trivia ==
- The clubs were divided into two groups of five for the first time in the League.
- Positions in the regular season were irrelevant. The team with most points in the Final round were declared champions.
- This was the season with the less goals scored so far, only 187 goals in 104 games.
