= 1984–85 Honduran Liga Nacional =

Liga Nacional
- Season: 1984–85
- Champions: Olimpia (7th)
- Relegated: Sula
- CONCACAF Champions' Cup: Olimpia; Vida
- Matches: 192
- Goals: 355 (1.85 per match)
- Top goalscorer: Centeno (17)

The 1984–85 Honduran Liga Nacional season was the 19th edition of the Honduran Liga Nacional. The format of the tournament consisted of a four round-robin schedule followed by a 4-team playoff round. Club Deportivo Olimpia won the title after winning both rounds and qualified to the 1985 CONCACAF Champions' Cup along with runners-up C.D.S. Vida.

== 1984–85 teams ==
- Juventud Morazánica (Tegucigalpa)
- Marathón (San Pedro Sula)
- Motagua (Tegucigalpa)
- Olimpia (Tegucigalpa)
- Platense (Puerto Cortés)
- Real España (San Pedro Sula)
- Sula (La Lima, promoted)
- Universidad (Tegucigalpa)
- Victoria (La Ceiba)
- Vida (La Ceiba)

== Regular season ==
=== Standings ===
Pos	Team	Pld	W	D	L	GF	GA	GD	Pts	Qualification or relegation
1	Olimpia (Note: Olimpia clinched a spot for final match.)	36	13	18	5	41	31	+10	44	Qualified to the Final round (Note: Top four qualify for final round.)
2	Vida	36	13	16	7	44	35	+9	42	Qualified to the Final round
3	Victoria	36	14	12	10	44	33	+11	40	Qualified to the Final round
4	Marathón	36	12	14	10	36	27	+9	38	Qualified to the Final round
5	Motagua	36	11	13	12	30	33	−3	35	
6	Platense	36	6	23	7	26	29	−3	35	
7	Universidad	36	9	16	11	35	39	−4	34	
8	Juventud Morazánica	36	6	20	10	27	34	−7	32	
9	Real España	36	9	14	13	26	34	−8	32	
10	Sula	36	8	12	16	27	41	−14	28	Relegated to the Second division (Note: Sula relegated to second division.)

== Final round ==
=== Cuadrangular standings ===
Pos	Team	Pld	W	D	L	GF	GA	GD	Pts
1	Olimpia (Note: Olimpia automatic champions as winner of regular season and final round. No final match was necessary.)	6	5	0	1	7	2	+5	10
2	Vida	6	2	2	2	6	5	+1	6
3	Victoria	6	1	2	3	4	7	−3	4
4	Marathón	6	1	2	3	2	5	−3	4

== Top scorer ==
- (Argentina) Luis O. Altamirano (Universidad) with 13 goals

== Squads ==
Juventud Morazánica
(Honduras) Oscar Villegas,	(Honduras) Jorge Hibrán Maldonado	(Honduras) Alfonso Ramón "Niño" López
(Honduras) Ramón Edgardo Moradel Zapata	(Honduras) Francisco Pancho Gonzalez	(Honduras) Kaco Reyes
(Honduras) "Tigre" Carbajal	(Honduras) Choreta Ordoñez	(Honduras) Crisanto Batista
(Honduras) Felix Cáceres	(El Salvador) Gilberto Ramírez	(Honduras) Samuel Rivera
(Honduras) Martin Lacayo	(Honduras) Pedro Manzanares
Marathón
(Honduras) Erasmo "Chícharo" Guerrero	(Honduras) José Luis "Joche" Alvarado	(Honduras) Jorge Alberto "Cuca" Bueso Iglesias
(Honduras) Marco Antonio "Tono" García	(Honduras) Oswaldo Zaldívar	(Honduras) Marco Antonio Chávez
(Honduras) Delio Billonay Fajardo	(Honduras) Noel Omar Renderos	(Honduras) Gilberto Leonel Machado García
(Honduras) Roberto Reynaldo "Robot" Bailey Sargent	(Honduras) Arturo Torres "Pacharaca" Bonilla	(Honduras) Pablo Madrid
(Honduras) Ciro Paulino "Palic" Castillo	(Honduras) Nelson Quiroz
Motagua
(Honduras) José Luis Cruz Figueroa	(Honduras) Roy Arturo Padilla Bardales	(Honduras) Luis Alberto "Chito" Reyes
(Honduras) Junior Rashford Costly	(Honduras) Juan Gómez Ortiz	(Honduras) Oscar Medina
(Honduras) Amílcar Leonel Suazo	(Honduras) Frank Ponce
Olimpia
(Argentina) Juan Néstor Dorony	(Honduras) Carlos Solís	(Honduras) Raúl Martínez Sambulá
(Honduras) Juan Alberto Flores Maradiaga	(Honduras) Alejandro "Indio" Ruiz	(Honduras) Arturo Recarte Cáceres
(Honduras) José Emilio Martínez	(Uruguay) José Mario "Chueco" Figueroa	(Honduras) Óscar Banegas
(Honduras) Bayardo Martínez	(Honduras) Fernando "Azulejo" Bulnes	(Honduras) Víctor Romero
(Honduras) Fernando Tovar	(Honduras) Víctor López	(Honduras) Armando Aguilar
(Honduras) Luis Arriola	(Honduras) Daniel Zapata	(Honduras) Ramón "Pilín" Bran
(Honduras) Jorge Alberto "Perro" González	(Honduras) Osman Madrid	(Honduras) Juan Carlos Espinoza
(Honduras) Prudencio "Tecate" Norales	(Honduras) Roger Javier Valladares	(Honduras) Carlos "Gigio" Maldonado
(Honduras) Belarmino Rivera	(Honduras) Benito Suazo	(Honduras) José González
(Honduras) Rigoberto Ruiz	(Honduras) Antonio "Flaco" Hernández	(Honduras) Darío Mejía
(Honduras) Mario Castellanos
Platense
(Honduras) Juan Jerezano	(Honduras) Armando López "Babalaba" Bodden	(Honduras) Raúl Centeno Gamboa
(Honduras) Eugenio Dolmo Flores	(Honduras) Carlos Roberto Deras	(Honduras) Carlos Javier Marquez
Real España
(Honduras) Julio César "El Tile" Arzú	(Honduras) José Mauricio "Guicho" Fúnez Barrientos	(Honduras) Jimmy Steward
(Honduras) Karl Antonio Roland	(Honduras) Jorge Arzú	(Honduras) David Maldonado
(Honduras) Manuel Fuentes López	(Honduras) Carlos Orlando Caballero	(Honduras) Edgardo Emilson Soto Fajardo
(Honduras) Nelson Benavídez	(Honduras) Hernán Santiago García Martínez	(Honduras) Esteban Pitío Centeno
(Honduras) Luis Laing	(Honduras) Nahúm Alberto Espinoza Zerón	(Honduras) Edith Hernando Contreras
(Honduras) Miguel Antonio "Hino" Mathews
Sula
(Honduras) Raúl David Fúnez	(Honduras) Marco Antonio "Machaca" Soriano	(Honduras) Fernando Nuila
(Honduras) Carlos "Perro" Zavala	(Honduras) Luis Alonso Zúniga	(Honduras) Antonio "Machangay" Amaya López
(Honduras) José Manuel Enamorado Díaz	(Honduras) Armando "Quebrado" Martínez	(Honduras) Manuel de Jesús Rivera
(Honduras) Celso Fredy Güity	(Honduras) Carlos Aguilar Bonilla
Universidad
(Argentina) Luis Oswaldo "Che" Altamirano	(Honduras) Julián Núñez	(Honduras) José Marcial "Canelo" Murillo
(Honduras) Salomón Nazzar	(Honduras) Olman Flores	(Honduras) Guillermo Salazar
(Honduras) Víctor Rutilio Mercadal	(Honduras) Jorge "Chino" Euceda	(Honduras) Nelson "La Titi" Pavón Castillo
(Honduras) Samuel "Chucho" Armijo	(Honduras) Roberto "Chele" Barahona	(Honduras) Víctor Romero
(Honduras) David Bueso
Victoria
(Honduras) Jorge Alberto "Camioncito" Duarte	(Honduras) Carlos Ramón Monchín" Rodríguez	(Honduras) Luis Azneth Ortiz
(Honduras) Luis Alonso Zelaya	(Honduras) David Goff	(Honduras) Luis Alonso "Chorompo" Zúniga
(Honduras) César Martínez	(Honduras) Miguel Angel "Primitivo" Ortiz	(Honduras) Ramón Berckling
Vida
(Honduras) Marvin Geovany "Mango" Henríquez	(Honduras) Wilson Omar Reyes Martínez	(Honduras) Natividad Morales Barrios
(Honduras) Marco Tulio "Zocadito" Zelaya	(Honduras) Rolando "Pipo" Valladares Laguna	(Honduras) Juan Dolmo "Juanito" Arzú
(Honduras) Matilde Selím Lacayo	(Honduras) Junior Mejía

== Known results ==
=== Round 1 ===
1984-02-19

Juventud Morazánica	0–1	Real España
		Arzú

1984-02-19

Platense	0–0	Marathón

Puerto Cortés

=== Cuadrangular ===
21 November 1984

Marathón	1–0	Olimpia

San Pedro Sula
25 November 1984

Victoria	2–0	Marathón
Zelaya

La Ceiba
2 December 1984

Vida	3–0	Victoria
Valladares

La Ceiba
2 December 1984

Olimpia	1–0	Marathón

Tegucigalpa
5 December 1984

Vida	0–1	Olimpia
		Dorony 84' (pen)

La Ceiba
9 December 1984

Olimpia	0–0	Victoria

Tegucigalpa

=== Unknown rounds ===
19 February 1984

Sula	1–1	Juventud Morazánica

El Progreso
22 February 1984

Olimpia	–	Real España
		Fuentes

Tegucigalpa
9 March 1984

Marathón	4–0	Olimpia

San Pedro Sula
7 April 1984

Motagua	2–2	Vida
		Acosta

Tegucigalpa
5 May 1984

Motagua	1–0	Marathón
Reyes

Tegucigalpa
16 May 1984

Olimpia	3–0	Marathón

Tegucigalpa
13 June 1984

Olimpia	2–0	Sula

15 July 1984

Motagua	2–1	Victoria
Suazo; Maradiaga		Ulruch

Tegucigalpa
22 July 1984

Vida	5–1	Juventud Morazánica

La Ceiba
28 July 1984

Real España	1–1	Sula

San Pedro Sula
2 August 1984

Victoria	4–0	Vida

La Ceiba
5 August 1984

Marathón	2–3	Motagua

San Pedro Sula
12 August 1984

Real España	1–0	Marathón
Maldonado

San Pedro Sula
19 August 1984

Marathón	5–0	Olimpia
Bueso; García; Renderos; Machado

San Pedro Sula
Referee: Óscar Chávez
22 August 1984

Vida	2–2	Real España

San Pedro Sula
26 August 1984

Motagua	2–1	Sula
Chavarría; Costly		Enamorado

Tegucigalpa
5 September 1984

Sula	2–0	Vida
Vindel

San Pedro Sula
5 September 1984
19:30

Motagua	1–3	Juventud Morazánica
Suazo		Reyes; Zapata; Manzanares

Tegucigalpa
30 September 1984

Real España	1–1	Olimpia
Centeno		Martínez

San Pedro Sula
Referee: Joaquín Ricardo Ortiz
28 October 1984

Sula	0–1	Victoria

San Pedro Sula
11 November 1984

Universidad	3–2	Olimpia

Tegucigalpa

Vida	3–0	Real España

Vida	3–0	Sula
