= 1986–87 Honduran Liga Nacional =

Liga Nacional
- Season: 1986–87
- Champions: Olimpia (8th)
- Relegated: Tela Timsa
- CONCACAF Champions' Cup: Olimpia; Real España
- Matches: 148
- Goals: 280 (1.89 per match)
- Top goalscorer: Dueñas (12)

The 1986–87 Honduran Liga Nacional season was the 21st edition of the Honduran Liga Nacional. The format of the tournament was the same as the 1985-86 season. Club Deportivo Olimpia successfully defended its 1985-86 season title in the final against runner-up Real C.D. España. Both qualified for berths to the 1987 CONCACAF Champions' Cup.

== 1986–87 teams ==
- E.A.C.I. (Isletas, promoted)
- Marathón (San Pedro Sula)
- Motagua (Tegucigalpa)
- Olimpia (Tegucigalpa)
- Platense (Puerto Cortés)
- Real España (San Pedro Sula)
- Sula (La Lima)
- Tela Timsa (Tela)
- Victoria (La Ceiba)
- Vida (La Ceiba)
- E.A.C.I. is from Isletas but played in Olanchito.

== Regular season ==
=== Standings Group A ===
Pos	Team	Pld	W	D	L	GF	GA	GD	Pts	Qualification or relegation
1	Vida	27	12	11	4	32	14	+18	35	Qualified to the Final round (Note: Vida and Olimpia qualified to the Final round.)
2	Olimpia	27	10	13	4	25	19	+6	33	Qualified to the Final round
3	Marathón	27	7	17	3	26	19	+7	31	
4	E.A.C.I.	27	6	10	11	16	22	−6	22	
5	Sula	27	6	10	11	27	19	+8	22	

=== Standings Group B ===
Pos	Team	Pld	W	D	L	GF	GA	GD	Pts	Qualification or relegation
1	Real España	27	9	12	6	25	23	+2	30	Qualified to the Final round (Note: Real España qualified to the Final round.)
2	Platense	27	8	12	7	27	25	+2	28	Qualified to the Repechage (Note: Platense and Motagua forced to play repechage.)
3	Motagua	27	8	12	7	27	26	+1	28	Qualified to the Repechage
4	Victoria	27	5	11	11	23	30	−7	21	
5	Tela Timsa	27	5	10	12	20	31	−11	20	Relegated to Segunda División (Note: Tela Timsa relegated to second division.)

=== Final round playoff ===
19 October 1986 Playoff	Platense	5–3	Motagua	San Pedro Sula, Cortés
	Chavarría			Stadium: Estadio Francisco Morazán

== Final round ==
=== Cuadrangular Standings ===
Pos	Team	Pld	W	D	L	GF	GA	GD	Pts	Qualification or relegation
1	Olimpia (Note: Olimpia champions as final round winner.)	6	4	2	0	8	3	+5	10	Qualified to the 1987 CONCACAF Champions' Cup
2	Real España (Note: Real España runner-up as second place in final round.)	6	4	1	1	11	4	+7	9	Qualified to the 1987 CONCACAF Champions' Cup
3	Vida	6	2	0	4	3	8	−5	4	
4	Platense	6	0	1	5	2	9	−7	1	

== Top scorer ==
- (Honduras) Cipriano Dueñas (Vida) with 12 goals

== Squads ==
E.A.C.I.
(Honduras) Miguel Angel "Payasito" Gómez	(Honduras) Geovany Rodríguez	(Honduras) Rony Galeas
(Honduras) Lincoln Gustavo Alemán	(Honduras) Juan Alberto "Ninja" Padilla Bardales	(Honduras) José Betancourt
(Honduras) Luis García	(Honduras) Omar "Carguero" Renderos	(Honduras) Luis Azneth Ortiz
(Honduras) Jorge Sierra	(Honduras) Raul David Fúnez	(Honduras) Edgar Murillo
(Honduras) Jorge Sánchez	(Honduras) Víctor Hugo Salgado	(Honduras) Alirio Posas
(Honduras) Ernesto Isaula	(Honduras) Héctor Beltrán	(Honduras) Roger Omar "Maisón" Rosales
(Honduras) Héctor Manuel Posantes	(Honduras) César Galindo	(Honduras) Jorge Meléndez
(Honduras) Tedy Lozano	(Honduras) Cándido Luis "Cubillo" García	(Honduras) Celio Sánchez
(Honduras) Rafael "Sietío" Torres Castro	(Honduras) Ramón Edgardo Moradel Zapata
(Honduras) Oscar Santiago "Tigre" Carbajal	(Honduras) Walter Baca Plummer
Marathón
(Honduras) Erasmo "Chícharo" Guerrero	(Honduras) Francisco Adelmo Herrera	(Honduras) José Luis "Joche" Alvarado
(Costa Rica) Jorge Chévez	(Honduras) Pedro Geovany Midence	(Honduras) Oswaldo Zaldívar
(Honduras) Jorge Suamy Álvarez	(Honduras) Ciro Paulino "Palic" Castillo	(Honduras) Roy Arturo Padilla Bardales
(Honduras) Jorge Alberto "Cuca" Bueso Iglesias	(Honduras) Aparicio Colón	(Honduras) Gilberto Leonel Machado García
(Honduras) Pablo Madrid
Motagua
(Honduras) Eugenio Meléndez	(Brazil) Carneiro Da Silva	(Honduras) Frank Ponce
(Honduras) Juan Gómez Ortiz	(Honduras) Manuel “Meme” Chavarría	(Honduras) Amílcar Leonel Suazo
(Honduras) Oscar Medina	(Honduras) Salón Nazzar	(Honduras) Ernesto "Neto" Isaula
(Brazil) Jean Rodríguez	(Honduras) Marco Tulio "Pollo" Suazo	(Honduras) Luis Cruz
(Honduras) Reynaldo Aparicio Colon	(Honduras) Manuel "Pechito" Zelaya	(Honduras) Isidro Arriola
(Honduras) Adolfo "Choreta" Ordoñez	(Honduras) Francisco "Pancho" Gonzales	(Brazil) Pires de Olivera
(Honduras) Celeo "Chimpilin" Herrera	(Honduras) Mario "Kivo" Almendares	(Honduras) Oscar Murillo
(Honduras) Jorge "Pando" Arriola	(Honduras) Oscar "Sapo" Hernández	(Honduras) Leonel Suazo
(Honduras) Jose Enríquez	(Honduras) Antonio "Toño" Obando
Olimpia
(Honduras) Óscar Banegas	(Honduras) Arturo Recarte Cáceres	(Honduras) Raúl Martínez Sambulá
(Honduras) Santos "Indio" Ruiz	(Honduras) José Antonio "Flaco" Hernández	(Honduras) Carlos Martínez
(Honduras) Juan Cruz Murillo	(Honduras) José Emilio Martínez	(Honduras) Carlos "Gigio" Maldonado
(Honduras) Javier Flores	(Honduras) Juan Flores	(Honduras) Patrocinio Sierra
(Honduras) Daniel Zapata	(Honduras) Eduardo Santana	(Honduras) Prudencio "Tecate" Norales
(Honduras) Fernando Tovar Durón	(Uruguay) Vicente Daniel Viera	(Honduras) Francisco Javier Toledo
Platense
(Honduras) Eugenio Dolmo Flores	(Honduras) Juan Jerezano	(Honduras) Gerald Vargas
(Honduras) Obdulio Vásquez	(Honduras) Jorge Arita Neals	(Honduras) Arturo Johnson
(Honduras) Iván Chavarría	(Honduras) Domingo Drummond	(Honduras) Armando López "Babalaba" Bodden
(Honduras) Raúl Centeno Gamboa
Real España
(Honduras) Julio César "El Tile" Arzú	(Honduras) Wilmer Enrique "Supermán" Cruz	(Honduras) José Mauricio "Guicho" Fúnez Barrientos
(Honduras) Jimmy Steward	(Honduras) Karl Antonio Roland	(Honduras) Hernán Santiago "Cortes" García Martínez
(Honduras) Marco Antonio Anariba Zepeda	(Honduras) Junior Rashford Costly	(Honduras) Edith Hernando Contreras
(Honduras) Juan Ramón "Montuca" Castro	(Honduras) Nelson Benavídez	(Honduras) Anthony Hinds Mathews
(Honduras) Esteban Pitío Centeno	(Honduras) Edgardo Emilson Soto Fajardo	(Honduras) Nahúm Alberto Espinoza Zerón
(Honduras) Carlos Orlando Caballero	(Honduras) Moises "El Chafa" Barahona
Sula
(Honduras) Fernando Nuila	(Honduras) José Manuel Enamorado Díaz	(Honduras) Antonio "Machangay" Amaya López
(Honduras) Pedro Manzanarez	(Honduras) Fernando Escalante	(Honduras) Óscar "Pito Loco" López
(Honduras) Luis Alonso Zúniga	(Honduras) Mario Bustillo	(Honduras) Matilde Selím Lacayo
(Honduras) Carlos Aguilar Bonilla
Tela Timsa
(Honduras) Raúl David Fúnez	(Honduras) Jorge Hibrán Maldonado	(Honduras) Noel Omar Renderos
(Honduras) Carlos Flores	(Honduras) Luis Laing	(Honduras) Jorge Rosales
(Honduras) Carlos "EL Perro" Zavala
Victoria
(Honduras) Jorge Alberto "Camioncito" Duarte	(Honduras) Jorge Alberto "Bala" Bennett	(Honduras) Miguel Angel "Primitivo" Ortiz
(Honduras) José Manuel Vaquedano	(Honduras) Manuel Fuentes López	(Honduras) Mariano Crisanto
(Honduras) Carlos Roberto "Condorito" Mejía Alvarenga	(Honduras) Ramón Berckling
Vida
(Honduras) Marvin Geovany "Mango" Henríquez	(Honduras) Cipriano Dueñas	(Honduras) Marco Tulio "Socadito" Zelaya
(Honduras) Wilson Omar Reyes Martínez	(Honduras) Rolando "Pipo" Valladares Laguna	(Honduras) Oscar Escobar

== Known results ==
=== Week 1 ===
23 February 1986 Week 1	Vida	1–0	E.A.C.I.	La Ceiba
				Stadium: Estadio Nilmo Edwards

Week 1	Platense	0–1	Victoria	Puerto Cortés
			Crisanto	Stadium: Estadio Excélsior

=== Round 27 ===
12 October 1986 Week 27	Olimpia	2–1	Tela Timsa	Tegucigalpa
				Stadium: Estadio Tiburcio Carías Andino

=== Cuadrangular ===
26 October 1986	Vida	0–2	Real España	La Ceiba
15:00			31' Matews; 76' Caballero	Stadium: Estadio Nilmo Edwards; Attendance: 4,416; Referee: Jorge Irías

2 November 1986	Olimpia	1–0	Real España	Tegucigalpa
	Norales			Stadium: Estadio Tiburcio Carías Andino

23 November 1986	Vida	2–0	Platense	La Ceiba
	Lobo; Williams			Stadium: Estadio Nilmo Edwards

23 November 1986	Real España	2–2	Olimpia	San Pedro Sula
	Chavarría; Costly		Flores; Williams	Stadium: Estadio Francisco Morazán

Olimpia	2–0	Vida	Tegucigalpa
Murillo (?)			Stadium: Estadio Tiburcio Carías Andino

=== Unknown rounds ===
2 March 1986

Sula	0–2	Vida
		Escobar

San Pedro Sula
3 April 1986

E.A.C.I.	2–0	Real España

Olanchito
20 April 1986

Olimpia	1–0	Marathón

Tegucigalpa
27 July 1986

Sula	1–1	Victoria

San Pedro Sula
17 August 1986

Platense	1–0	Olimpia

Puerto Cortés
17 August 1986

Motagua	3–0	Real España

31 August 1986

Victoria	2–1	Sula

La Ceiba
12 October 1986

Vida	3–1	Motagua
Henríquez; Zelaya; Williams		Ponce

La Ceiba
15 October 1986

Sula	1–0	Real España
Aguilar

Motagua	0–1	Marathón

Tegucigalpa

Victoria	0–3	Marathón

La Ceiba

Marathón	0–0	Tela Timsa

San Pedro Sula

Marathón	1–0	E.A.C.I.

San Pedro Sula

Marathón	0–0	Sula

San Pedro Sula

Marathón	0–0	Real España

San Pedro Sula

Marathón	0–0	Vida

San Pedro Sula
