= Danilo Galindo =

Honduran footballer (born 1963)

Personal information
- Full name: Danilo Arturo Galindo
- Date of birth: 4 March 1963 (age 63)
- Place of birth: La Ceiba, Honduras
- Position: Defender

Senior career*
Years	Team	Apps	(Gls)
1984–1986	Platense		
1986–1987	Vida		
1987–1992	Olimpia		
1992–1993	León de Huánuco		
1994	Herediano		(0)
1994–1995	Ciclista Lima		
1995–1997	Olimpia		
1997–1998	Palestino		

International career
1985–1991	Honduras	9	(0)
- * Club domestic league appearances and goals

Danilo Arturo Galindo (born 4 March 1963) is a retired Honduran football player who played for the national team in the 1980s and 90s.

== Club career ==
Nicknamed Pollo (Chicken), Galindo played for Honduran sides Platense, Vida, Olimpia and Palestino as well as in Peru for León de Huánuco and Ciclista Lima. He also played alongside compatriot Nicolás Suazo at Herediano in Costa Rica, he did not score a goal for the club. He played with Nahúm Espinoza, Alex Pineda Chacón, Belarmino Rivera, Juan Carlos Espinoza and Eugenio Dolmo Flores in the Olimpia and they won the CONCACAF Champions League in 1988.

== International career ==
Galindo made his debut for Honduras in a September 1985 FIFA World Cup qualification match against Canada and has earned a total of 9 caps, scoring no goals. He has represented his country in only that one FIFA World Cup qualification match and played at the 1991 UNCAF Nations Cup.

His final international was a May 1991 UNCAF Nations Cup match against Guatemala.

== Retirement ==
Galindo moved to the United States in 2000 to find a job as a painter in Boca Raton.

== Personal life ==
Pollo is son of Asunción and Mercedes Galindo and he is married to Ángela Jiménez de Galindo. He has 2 daughters Ingrid Daniella and Ana Maria and 1 son Danilo Armando Galindo .

== Honours and awards ==
=== Club ===
C.D. Olimpia

- Liga Profesional de Honduras (4):1986–87 1987–88, 1989–90, 1995–96
- CONCACAF Champions League (1): 1988
