= Juan Carlos Espinoza (Honduran footballer) =

Honduran footballer (born 1958)

Personal information
- Full name: Juan Carlos Espinoza Zerón
- Date of birth: 24 August 1958 (age 68)
- Place of birth: Tela, Honduras
- Position: Midfielder

Senior career*
Years	Team	Apps	(Gls)
1980–1981	Real España		
1984–1996	Olimpia		
1989	Alajuelense	4	(0)

International career^{‡}
1985–1994	Honduras		(2)

Managerial career
- 2002A: Olimpia
- 2008A: Olimpia
- 2011C: Olimpia
- 2012A: Real España (assistant)
- * Club domestic league appearances and goals ‡ National team caps and goals as of 5 January 2013

Juan Carlos Espinoza Zerón (born 24 August 1958) is a retired Honduran football player, who most recently was assistant manager of Real España in the Liga Nacional de Honduras.

== Club career ==
He started his career at Real España but spent the majority of his career with Olimpia. He also had a short stint at Costa Rican side Alajuelense. He played with Alex Pineda Chacón, Belarmino Rivera, Eugenio Dolmo Flores, Danilo Galindo and his brother Nahúm Espinoza in the Olimpia and they won the CONCACAF Champions League in 1988.

== International career ==
Espinoza made his debut for Honduras in the 1980s and has earned at least 14 caps, scoring 2 goals. He has represented his country in 3 FIFA World Cup qualification match and played at the 1991 UNCAF Nations Cup as well as at the 1991 and 1993 CONCACAF Gold Cups. In the 1991 Gold Cup Final, he missed the decisive penalty.

His final international was a December 1994 friendly match against the United States, a game in which his brother Nahún made his international debut.

=== International goals ===
Scores and results list Honduras' goal tally first.

N.	Date	Venue	Opponent	Score	Result	Competition
1.	2 June 1991	Estadio Ricardo Saprissa, Tibas, Costa Rica	El Salvador	1–0	2–1	1991 UNCAF Nations Cup
2.	28 June 1991	Los Angeles Memorial Coliseum, Los Angeles, United States	Canada	2–0	4–2	1991 CONCACAF Gold Cup

== Managerial career ==
As a manager, he won the 2002 Apertura with Olimpia as well as the 2008 Apertura. In March 2009 he succeeded Colombian Carlos Restrepo at Olimpia.

In September 2012, Juan Carlos was named as assistant to his brother, Nahúm Espinoza, who succeeded Chelato Uclés as manager of Real España while also still being assistant to manager Danilo Tosello at Olimpia.

== Personal life ==
Juan Carlos is the older brother of former international defender Nahúm Espinoza. Their brother Enrique, who died in April 2012, was also a former player of Olimpia.

== Honours and awards ==
=== Club ===
C.D. Olimpia

- Liga Profesional de Honduras (5): 1984–85, 1987–88, 1989–90, 1992–93, 1995–96
- Honduran Cup: (1): 1995
- CONCACAF Champions League (1): 1988

C.D. Real Espana

- Liga Profesional de Honduras (1): 1980–81
