= 1979 Honduran Segunda División =

Honduran Segunda División
- Season: 1979–80
- Champions: Atlético Fusep
- Promoted: Atlético Fusep
- All statistics correct as of 23 December 1979.

The 1979 Honduran Segunda División was the 13th season of the Honduran Segunda División. Under the management of Carlos Padilla, Atlético Fusep won the tournament after defeating Juventud Ribereña in the final series and obtained promotion to the 1980–81 Honduran Liga Nacional.

== Final ==
December 1979 1st leg	Juventud Ribereña	0–0	Atlético Fusep

23 December 1979 2nd leg	Atlético Fusep	2–0	Juventud Ribereña	Tegucigalpa, Francisco Morazán
				Stadium: Estadio Tiburcio Carías Andino

- Atlético Fusep won 2–0 on aggregate.
