= Belarmino Rivera =

Honduran footballer (born 1956)

Personal information
- Full name: Belarmino Jose Rivera Jimminson
- Date of birth: February 5, 1956 (age 70)
- Place of birth: Honduras
- Height: 1.79 m (5 ft 10 in)
- Position: Goalkeeper

Senior career*
| Years | Team | Apps | (Gls) |
| 1977–1985 | Olimpia | | |
| 1987–1988 | Sula | | |
| 1988–1995 | Olimpia | | |
- Platense
- Victoria
| 1997 | Real Maya | | |

International career
| 1980–1993 | Honduras | 46 | (0) |
- * Club domestic league appearances and goals

Belarmino Rivera Jimminson (born 1956) is a retired Honduran football player.

== Club career ==
Nino Rivera played for Olimpia, Sula, Platense, Victoria and Real Maya in the Honduran national league. He made his debut with Olimpia in 1975 and finished his career with Real Maya in 1997, aged 42. His final league game was on 30 August 1997 against Marathón.

He won 4 goalkeeper of the year awards, 3 with Olimpia and 1 with Sula. He was also a goalscorer when between the posts for Olimpa and Sula. He won the CONCACAF Champions League in 1988 with Olimpia when he played beside Alex Pineda Chacón, Eugenio Dolmo Flores, Juan Carlos Espinoza, Danilo Galindo and Nahúm Espinoza.

== International career ==
Rivera made his debut for Honduras in the late 1980s and played in and has earned a total of 46 caps, scoring no goals. He has represented his country in 12 FIFA World Cup qualification matches and played at the 1991 and 1993 UNCAF Nations Cups, as well as at the 1991 CONCACAF Gold Cup. He was a non-playing squad member at the 1993 CONCACAF Gold Cup.

His final international was an 18 April 1993 FIFA World Cup qualification match against Canada in which he came on as a substitute when Angelo Bautista was sent off. His first task was to face a penalty by John Catliff, which was successful and gave Canada their final goal in a 3–1 Canadian win.

== Personal life ==
His son José Belarmino Rivera Rosales also played for Olimpia.

== Honours and awards ==
=== Club ===
C.D. Olimpia

- Liga Profesional de Honduras (3): 1984–85, 1989–90, 1992–93
- CONCACAF Champions League (1): 1988

=== Country ===
Honduras

- Copa Centroamericana (1): 1993,
