= 1980–81 Honduran Liga Nacional =

Liga Nacional
- Season: 1980–81
- Champions: Real España (4th)
- Relegated: None
- CONCACAF Champions' Cup: Real España; Marathón
- Copa Fraternidad: Real España; Marathón; Olimpia; Vida
- Matches: 158
- Goals: 358 (2.27 per match)
- Top goalscorer: Altamirano (13)
- All statistics correct as of 17 December 1980.

The 1980–81 Honduran Liga Nacional season was the 15th edition of the Honduran Liga Nacional. The format of the tournament remained the same as the previous season. Real C.D. España won the title after defeating C.D. Marathón in a 3-series final. Both teams qualified to the 1981 CONCACAF Champions' Cup. Additionally, Real España, Marathón, Club Deportivo Olimpia and C.D.S. Vida obtained berths to the 1981 Copa Fraternidad. Due to the national team's participation at the 1982 FIFA World Cup qualifiers, the league defined that no relegation was to take place this season. C.D. Platense which finished last, was financially penalized though.

== 1980–81 teams ==
- Atlético Morazán (Tegucigalpa, promoted)
- Broncos (Choluteca)
- Marathón (San Pedro Sula)
- Motagua (Tegucigalpa)
- Olimpia (Tegucigalpa)
- Platense (Puerto Cortés)
- Real España (San Pedro Sula)
- Universidad (Tegucigalpa)
- Victoria (La Ceiba)
- Vida (La Ceiba)

== Regular season ==
=== Standings ===
Pos	Team	Pld	W	D	L	GF	GA	GD	Pts	Qualification or relegation
1	Real España (Note: Real España clinched Final spot as regular season winner.)	27	14	6	7	35	26	+9	34	Qualified to the Final round (Note: Top five qualify to Final round.)
2	Vida	27	12	7	8	33	30	+3	31	Qualified to the Final round
3	Marathón	27	8	13	6	39	32	+7	29	Qualified to the Final round
4	Olimpia	27	10	9	8	31	32	−1	29	Qualified to the Final round
5	Victoria	27	10	8	9	27	33	−6	28	Qualified to the Final round
6	Motagua	27	6	15	6	32	30	+2	27	
7	Universidad	27	10	3	14	33	35	−2	23	
8	Broncos	27	6	11	10	28	30	−2	23	
9	Atlético Morazán	27	7	9	11	28	32	−4	23	
10	Platense	27	7	9	11	22	27	−5	23	

Notes:
- No relegation this season.

== Final round ==
=== Pentagonal standings ===
Pos	Team	Pld	W	D	L	GF	GA	GD	Pts	Qualification or relegation
1	Marathón	8	4	3	1	13	6	+7	11	Forced to play extra round (Note: After a three-way tie between Marathón, Olimpia, and Real España with 11 points; an extra one-robin round was required, however all games finished leveled and the tie persisted, therefore Marathón qualified to the Final by goal difference on all rounds together.)
2	Olimpia	8	4	3	1	12	4	+8	11	Forced to play extra round
3	Real España	8	5	1	2	12	9	+3	11	Forced to play extra round
4	Vida	8	1	3	4	4	11	−7	5	
5	Victoria	8	0	2	6	3	14	−11	2	

=== Final ===
6 December 1980 1st leg	Real España	2–0	Marathón	San Pedro Sula, Cortés
	Chavarría 11'; Mendoza 45'			Stadium: Estadio General Francisco Morazán; Referee: Porfirio Guerra

11 December 1980 2nd leg	Marathón	1–0	Real España	San Pedro Sula, Cortés
	Bailey			Stadium: Estadio General Francisco Morazán; Referee: Germán Palma

17 December 1980 3rd leg	Real España	2–1 (a.e.t.)	Marathón	San Pedro Sula, Cortés
	Jimminson 3'; Costly 93'		1' Pavón	Stadium: Estadio General Francisco Morazán; Referee: José Andino

== Top scorer ==
- (Argentina) Luis O. Altamirano (Broncos) with 13 goals

== Squads ==
Atlético Morazán
(Honduras) José Luis Cruz Figueroa	(Honduras) José Estanislao "Tanayo" Ortega	(Honduras) Noel Omar Renderos
(Honduras) Héctor "Lin" Zelaya
Broncos
(Argentina) Luis Oswaldo "Che" Altamirano	(Uruguay) Iván Ramos	(Honduras) Dennis Williams
(Honduras) Iván Guerra	(Honduras) César Humberto Carranza	(Honduras) Luis Rosales Brand
(Honduras) German "Loco" Guzmán	(Honduras) Carlos Mondragón	(Honduras) Orlando Flores
(Honduras) Cruz Ramón Serrano "Guaya" Cruz	(Brazil) Pedro Pinheiro	(Honduras) Rubén Guardado
(Honduras) Marcial Bonilla	(Honduras) Orlando Rodríguez	(Argentina) Luis Alberto Escaurizza
(Honduras) José Marcial "Canelo" Murillo	(Honduras) "Yuyuguita" Flores	(Honduras) Marco Tulio Cacho
(Honduras) Samuel "Chucho" Armijo	(Honduras) Marco Tulio Cárcamo	(Honduras) Isidro Arriola
(Honduras) Enrique "Pilo" Soriano	(Honduras) José Ramón Hinds	(Honduras) Antonio Almendárez
(Honduras) Jairo Lezama	(Honduras) Rigoberto "Chombo" Aguilar	(Honduras) Mario López
(Honduras) Oscar "Zorro" Lezama
Marathón
(Uruguay) Jorge Phoyoú	(Honduras) Wilfredo Brown	(Honduras) Jorge Alberto "Cuca" Bueso Iglesias
(Honduras) Roberto Reynaldo "Robot" Bailey Sargent	(Honduras) Jorge Martínez	(Argentina) Alberto Merelles
(Honduras) Francisco Javier Toledo	(Honduras) Ramón "Albañil" Osorio	(Honduras) Arturo Torres "Pacharaca" Bonilla
(Honduras) Carlos Mejía	(Honduras) José Ángel Peña	(Honduras) Oswaldo Zaldívar
(Argentina) Alfredo Dimaio	(Honduras) Antonio "Gato" Pavón Molina	(Honduras) Hernán Santiago "Cortés" García Martínez
(Honduras) René "Maravilla" Suazo	(Honduras) José Martínez	(Argentina) Juan Carlos Weber
(Honduras) Francisco Zelaya Pastrana	(Honduras) Arturo Payne	(Honduras) Richard Kenneth Payne
(Honduras) Félix Concepción Carranza	(Honduras) Gilberto Leonel Machado García	(Honduras) Celso Fredy Güity
(Honduras) Rigoberto Castro	(Honduras) Rolando Padilla "Moro" Bardales	(Honduras) Margarito Castillo
(Honduras) Fernando Figueroa	(Honduras) Carlos Guevara	(Honduras) Luis Alonso Guzmán Velásquez
(Honduras) Juan Contreras	(Honduras) Óscar Romero
Motagua
(Honduras) German "Loco" Guzmán	(Chile) Mario Hernán Juviny Carreño	(Honduras) Luis Alberto "Chito" Reyes
(Honduras) Rigoberto Sosa	(Honduras) Víctor Manuel Chávez	(Honduras) José Salomón "Turco" Nazzar
Olimpia
(Honduras) Óscar Banegas	(Honduras) Darío Cribas	(Honduras) Roberto Valentín "Pirata" Fernández
(Honduras) Alejandro "Indio" Ruiz	(Honduras) José Batiz	(Honduras) Víctor Calero Lozano
(Honduras) Rigoberto Ruiz	(Honduras) Emilio Martínez	(Honduras) Fredy Ríos
(Honduras) Basilio Avila	(Honduras) Ramón Antonio "Pilín" Brand	(Honduras) Rigoberto "Shula" Gómez
(Argentina) Raúl Cocherari	(Brazil) José Luis Januario	(Honduras) Jorge Alberto "Perro" González
(Honduras) Carlos Solís	(Honduras) Óscar García	(Honduras) Víctor Romero
(Honduras) Daniel Zapata	(Honduras) Antonio Alemán	(Honduras) Héctor Uclés
(Brazil) Nelson de Moraes	(Brazil) Alcides Carota	(Honduras) Arturo Cáceres
(Honduras) Horacio Parham Castro
Platense
(Honduras) Juan Jerezano	(Honduras) Jorge Luis Mancía	(Honduras) Tomás Cedricks Ewens "Quito" Wagner
(Honduras) Alex Rodríguez	(Honduras) Carlos Cruz Colindres	(Honduras) Antonio Laing
(Honduras) Modesto Ayestas
Real España
(Honduras) Julio César "El Tile" Arzú	(Honduras) Jimmy Steward	(Honduras) Clinton Campbell
(Costa Rica) Didier Gutiérrez	(Honduras) Carlos Orlando Caballero	(Argentina) Jorge Alberto Centurión
(Honduras) Walter Jimminson	(Honduras) Allan Costly	(Honduras) Víctor Hugo Salgado
(Honduras) Julio Roberto "Chino" Ortiz	(Honduras) Francisco García	(Honduras) Marcos Campbell
(Honduras) German "Cacique" Castro	(Honduras) Javier Latreza	(Honduras) Miguel Antonio "Hino" Mathews
(Honduras) Edith Hernando Contreras	(Argentina) Enrique "Fantasma" Mendoza	(Honduras) Jimmy James Bailey
(Honduras) Javier Chavarría	(Chile) Julio del Carmen Tapia Callao	(Honduras) Jaime Villegas
(Honduras) Junior Rashford Costly	(Honduras) Roberto "Sargento" Barahona	(Honduras) Juan Carlos Espinoza
(Costa Rica) Carlos Solano	(Honduras) Marcos Lacayo	(Honduras) José Antonio "Gin" García
(Honduras) Oscar Velásquez	(Costa Rica) Roscoe Charles	(Honduras) Carlos Rivera
(Honduras) Edelmín "Pando" Castro	(Honduras) Alberto Chedrany
Universidad
(Honduras) Raúl David Fúnez	(Honduras) Olvin Elvir	(Honduras) Walter "Estupiñán" Amador
(Honduras) Daniel "Diablo" Sambulá	(Honduras) Edimar Luiz Marques
Victoria
(Honduras) Jorge Alberto "Camioncito" Duarte	(Honduras) Luis Alonso "Chorompo" Zúniga	(Honduras) Francisco Jiménez
(Honduras) Efraín Martínez "Diablillo" Amaya	(Honduras) José Reynaldo Villagra	(Honduras) Fausto Humberto "Chiva" Ruiz
(Honduras) Benedicto Ordóñez	(Honduras) Ramón Nectaly "Liebre" Guardado	(Honduras) Miguel Angel "Primitivo" Ortiz
(Honduras) David Goff
Vida
(Honduras) Matilde Selím Lacayo	(Honduras) Roberto "Macho" Figueroa	(Honduras) Junior Mejía

== Known results ==
=== Round 1 ===
Marathón	1–0	Atlético Morazán
Martínez

San Pedro Sula

=== Round 22 ===
27 July 1980

Vida	1–0	Victoria
Arzú

La Ceiba
28 July 1980

Motagua	3–3	Olimpia
Marquinho; Carreño		González; Yanuario

Tegucigalpa
Attendance: 9,000
Referee: Félix Gómez

=== Pentagonal ===
14 September 1980	Olimpia	1–1	Marathón	Tegucigalpa
				Stadium: Estadio Tiburcio Carías Andino

28 September 1980	Real España	3–1	Olimpia	San Pedro Sula
	Centurión; Chavarría; Caballero		Romero	Stadium: Estadio General Francisco Morazán

5 October 1980	Olimpia	4–0	Vida	Tegucigalpa
	Ríos			Stadium: Estadio Tiburcio Carías Andino

12 October 1980	Marathón	5–0	Real España	San Pedro Sula
	Bueso; Bailey; Pavón; García			Stadium: Estadio General Francisco Morazán; Referee: Cecilio Midence

29 October 1980	Olimpia	1–0	Real España	Tegucigalpa
	Januario			Stadium: Estadio Tiburcio Carías Andino

2 November 1980	Real España	2–0	Marathón	San Pedro Sula
	Chavarría; Solano			Stadium: Estadio General Francisco Morazán

5 November 1980	Marathón	0–0	Olimpia	San Pedro Sula
				Stadium: Estadio General Francisco Morazán

18 November 1980	Olimpia	1–1	Marathón	Tegucigalpa
				Stadium: Estadio Tiburcio Carías Andino
Note: Extra game

20 November 1980	Real España	1–1	Olimpia	San Pedro Sula
	Solano		Fernández	Stadium: Estadio General Francisco Morazán
Note: Extra game

23 November 1980	Marathón	0–0	Real España	San Pedro Sula
				Stadium: Estadio General Francisco Morazán
Note: Extra game

=== Unknown rounds ===
3 March 1980

Vida	1–0	Universidad

La Ceiba
9 March 1980

Marathón	4–0	Olimpia
Bueso; Bonilla; Machado; Pavón

San Pedro Sula
9 March 1980

Atlético Morazán	4–1	Real España

Tegucigalpa
23 March 1980

Olimpia	0–2	Platense
		Colindres; Laing

Tegucigalpa
13 April 1980

Motagua	2–2	Marathón
		Payne

Tegucigalpa
4 May 1980

Broncos	4–0	Vida

Choluteca
11 May 1980

Universidad	3–0	Olimpia

Tegucigalpa
22 June 1980

Vida	0–3	Marathón
		Osorio; Toledo

La Ceiba
17 August 1980

Real España	1–0	Olimpia
Fernández

San Pedro Sula
24 August 1980

Marathón	2–2	Motagua
Pavón; Güity		Lobatón; Bueso

San Pedro Sula
1980

Real España	2–1	Universidad

San Pedro Sula

Victoria	2–1	Universidad

La Ceiba
