= Súper Estrella =

Honduran football club

- Nickname(s): Super
- Ground: Estadio Marcelo Tinoco; Danlí, Honduras
- Capacity: 6,000
- Manager: Rodrígo Castillo Flores
- League: Liga Nacional de Honduras
- Website: www.lina.hn
Home colours	Away colours	Third colours

Súper Estrella was a Honduran football club, based in Danlí, Honduras. The club played in the Honduran Liga Nacional for four seasons from 1989 to 1991.

== History ==
Súper Estrella obtained promotion to Liga Nacional in December 1988 as winners of the 1988 Honduran Segunda División. They became the first team to represent El Paraíso Department in the top division where they played four consecutive years from 1989–90 to 1992–93. However, they didn't make a big impact. The club owns the negative record of being the only team in league's history of spending a whole season without a single victory. This happened in 1992–93 with a 0–6–21 record, resulting in the team's relegation to Segunda División.

== Achievements ==
- Segunda División

Winners (1): 1988

Ascenso 1B 1986 Ascenso 1A 1987

== League performance ==
Season	Pos.	GP	W–D–L	F:A	GD	Pts.	Playoff finish
1989–90	9th	27	6–10–11	29:39	–10	22	Didn't enter
1990–91	10th	27	5–11–11	22:41	–19	21	Didn't enter
Totals		108	16–36–56	89:197	–108	68	Didn't enter
