= 1989–90 Honduran Liga Nacional =

Liga Nacional
- Season: 1989–90
- Champions: Olimpia (10th)
- Relegated: Curacao
- CONCACAF Champions' Cup: Olimpia; Real España
- Matches: 160
- Goals: 280 (1.75 per match)
- Top goalscorer: Ávila (13)
- All statistics correct as of 10 January 1990.

The 1989–90 Honduran Liga Nacional season was the 24th edition of the Honduran Liga Nacional. The format of the tournament was the same as the 1987-88 season and was a rematch of the 23rd edition final. Club Deportivo Olimpia successfully defended its 1989 title after defeating in the final runner-up Real C.D. España. Title holder and runner-up qualified for berths to the 1990 CONCACAF Champions' Cup.

== 1989–90 teams ==
- Curacao (Tegucigalpa)
- Marathón (San Pedro Sula)
- Motagua (Tegucigalpa)
- Olimpia (Tegucigalpa)
- Platense (Puerto Cortés)
- Real España (San Pedro Sula)
- Sula (La Lima)
- Súper Estrella (Danlí, promoted)
- Victoria (La Ceiba)
- Vida (La Ceiba)
- Platense played their home games at Estadio Francisco Morazán due to renovations at Estadio Excélsior.

== Regular season ==
=== Standings Group A ===
Pos	Team	Pld	W	D	L	GF	GA	GD	Pts	Qualification or relegation
1	Olimpia (Note: Olimpia clinched Final spot as Regular season winner.)	27	15	10	2	39	17	+22	40	Qualified to the Final round (Note: Olimpia, Marathón and Platense qualified to Final round.)
2	Marathón	27	10	12	5	24	24	0	32	Qualified to the Final round
3	Platense	27	7	11	9	20	21	−1	25	Qualified to the Final round
4	Victoria	27	6	12	9	0	18	−18	24	
5	Súper Estrella	27	6	10	11	29	39	−10	22	

=== Standings Group B ===
Pos	Team	Pld	W	D	L	GF	GA	GD	Pts	Qualification or relegation
1	Real España	27	12	12	3	31	16	+15	36	Qualified to the Final round (Note: Real España and Motagua qualified to Final round.)
2	Motagua	27	9	10	8	29	23	+6	28	Qualified to the Final round
3	Sula	27	4	13	10	11	18	−7	21	To Relegation playoffs (Note: Sula, Vida and Platense to play a Triangular for relegation.)
4	Vida	27	5	11	11	20	29	−9	21	To Relegation playoffs
5	Curacao	27	5	11	11	22	37	−15	21	To Relegation playoffs

== Final round ==
=== Relegation playoffs ===
15 October 1989	Curacao	1–2	Sula	Tegucigalpa
				Stadium: Estadio Tiburcio Carías Andino

18 October 1989	Sula	0–0	Vida	San Pedro Sula
				Stadium: Estadio General Francisco Morazán

29 October 1989	Vida	1–1	Curacao	La Ceiba
				Stadium: Estadio Nilmo Edwards

=== Relegation standings ===
Pos	Team	Pld	W	D	L	GF	GA	GD	Pts	Qualification or relegation
8	Sula	2	1	1	0	2	1	+1	3	
9	Vida	2	0	2	0	1	1	0	2	
3	Curacao	2	0	1	1	2	3	−1	1	Relegated to Segunda División

=== Pentagonal standings ===
Pos	Team	Pld	W	D	L	GF	GA	GD	Pts	Qualification or relegation
1	Real España	8	5	3	0	12	2	+10	13 (Note: Platense–Motagua and Real España–Marathón were canceled due to irrelevance and shared points.)	Qualified to the Final (Note: Real España qualified to Final as Pentagonal winner.)
2	Olimpia	8	3	4	1	9	4	+5	10	
3	Motagua	8	2	3	3	5	8	−3	7	
4	Platense	8	2	2	4	3	9	−6	6	
5	Marathón	8	0	4	4	2	8	−6	4	

=== Final ===
27 December 1989 1st leg	Real España	1–0	Olimpia	San Pedro Sula, Cortés
	Sosa			Stadium: Estadio Francisco Morazán; Referee: Emiliano Ramírez

10 January 1990 2nd leg	Olimpia	1–0 (a.e.t.)	Real España	Tegucigalpa, Francisco Morazán
	Williams 87'			Stadium: Estadio Tiburcio Carías Andino; Attendance: 34,252; Referee: Julio López

- Olimpia 1–1 Real España on aggregate; Olimpia champions as better goal difference in Regular season and Final round together.

== Top scorer ==
- (Honduras) Álex Geovany Ávila (Real España) with 13 goals

== Squads ==
Marathón
(Honduras) Francisco Adelmo Herrera	(Honduras) José Luis "Joche" Alvarado	(Honduras) Roy Arturo Padilla Bardales
(Honduras) Oscar Gerardo "Maradona" Cruz	(Honduras) José Ulloa Villatoro	(Honduras) Nicolás Suazo Velásquez
(Honduras) Mauro Pacheco	(Honduras) Pastor Martínez	(Honduras) Neptaly Turcios
(Honduras) José Manuel Enamorado Díaz	(Honduras) Pedro Geovany Midence	(Honduras) Ciro Paulino "Palic" Castillo
(Honduras) Leonel Machado
Motagua
(Honduras) Marvin Geovany "Mango" Henríquez	(Honduras) Miguel Antonio Mathews Sargent	(Costa Rica) Gerardo "Cholo" Villalobos
(Honduras) Hernaín Arzú	(Honduras) Rosmán Calderón	(Honduras) Patrocinio Sierra Doblado
(Honduras) José Mario "Kivo" Almendárez
Olimpia
(Honduras) Óscar Banegas	(Honduras) Belarmino Rivera	(Uruguay) Carlos José Laje Moreno
(Honduras) Juan Alberto Flores Maradiaga	(Honduras) Eugenio Dolmo Flores	(Honduras) Santos "Indio" Ruiz
(Honduras) José Antonio "Flaco" Hernández	(Honduras) Javier Flores	(Honduras) Alex Pineda Chacón
(Honduras) Fernando Tovar Durón	(Uruguay) Juan Carlos "Rata" Contreras	(Uruguay) Vicente Daniel Viera
(Honduras) Juan Carlos Espinoza	(Honduras) Rudy Alberto Williams	(Honduras) Nahúm Alberto Espinoza Zerón
(Honduras) Erick Darío Fú Lanza	(Honduras) Darío Mejía	(Honduras) Danilo "Pollo" Galindo
(Honduras) Daniel Zapata
Platense
(Honduras) Marco Antonio Gómez	(Honduras) Raúl Centeno Gamboa	(Honduras) Jorge Arita Neals
Real España
(Uruguay) Jorge López Silva	(Honduras) Julio César "El Tile" Arzú	(Honduras) Wilmer Enrique "Supermán" Cruz
(Honduras) José Mauricio "Guicho" Fúnez Barrientos	(Honduras) Alex Geovany Ávila	(Honduras) Marco Antonio Anariba Zepeda
(Honduras) Carlos Orlando Caballero	(Honduras) Luis "Gavilán" Cálix	(Honduras) Nahamán Humberto González
(Honduras) Juan Ramón "Montuca" Castro	(Honduras) Rigoberto "Rigo" González	(Honduras) Carlos Fernando Landa
(Honduras) Camilo Bonilla Paz	(Honduras) Erick Gerardo Gallegos
(Honduras) Karl Antonio Roland	(Honduras) Rolando "Pipo" Valladares Laguna	(Honduras) Edgardo Emilson Soto Fajardo
(Honduras) Juan "Nito" Anariba	(Honduras) Edith Hernando Contreras	(Argentina) Marcelino Blanco
Sula
(Honduras) Fernando Nuila	(Honduras) Óscar "Pito Loco" López	(Honduras) José Luis "Pili" Aguirre
(Honduras) Carlos Aguilar Bonilla	(Honduras) Roger Javier Valladares	(Honduras) Edgardo Geovany "Yura" Róchez
(Honduras) Luis Alonso Zúniga
Súper Estrella
(Honduras) Víctor Orlando Garay	(Honduras) Víctor Hernán Duarte
Victoria
(Honduras) Jorge Alberto "Bala" Bennett	(Honduras) Carlos Roberto "Condorito" Mejía Alvarenga	(Honduras) Ramón Berckling
(Honduras) Enrique Reneau	(Honduras) Mario Lanza	(Costa Rica) Jorge Manuel Ulate
(Honduras) Renán "Chimbo" Aguilera Contreras
Vida
(Honduras) Carlos Ramírez	(Honduras) Wilson Omar Reyes Martínez	(Honduras) Mario Peri
(Honduras) Clayburn McKenzie "El Caracol"	(Honduras) Miguel Guity	(Honduras) Peter Buchanan
(Honduras) Rudy Pine Pack	(Honduras) "Maizon" Rosales	(Honduras) José Danilo Carías Figueroa
(Honduras) René Arturo David "Pupa" Martínez	(Honduras) Jorge Ernesto Pineda

== Known results ==
=== Round 1 ===
11 March 1989

Sula	0–1	Real España
		Caballero

San Pedro Sula
15 March 1989

Platense	2–0	Súper Estrella

San Pedro Sula

=== Pentagonal ===
20 October 1989

Olimpia	0–0	Real España

Tegucigalpa
26 October 1989

Motagua	0–0	Olimpia

Tegucigalpa
29 October 1989

Olimpia	0–0	Marathón

Tegucigalpa
2 November 1989

Motagua	2–0	Marathón
Villalobos

Tegucigalpa
5 November 1989

Motagua	0–2	Real España

Tegucigalpa
12 November 1989

Motagua	1–0	Victoria
Villalobos

Tegucigalpa
15 November 1989

Real España	2–0	Marathón
Caballero; Anariba

San Pedro Sula
18 November 1989

Real España	2–2	Olimpia
Avila; Caballero		Zapata; Espinoza

San Pedro Sula
22 November 1989

Marathón	1–1	Motagua
Valerio		Matthews

San Pedro Sula
29 November 1989

Marathón	0–1	Platense
		Laing

San Pedro Sula
2 December 1989

Olimpia	4–1	Motagua
Laje; Pineda		Villalobos

San Pedro Sula
6 December 1989

Marathón	0–1	Olimpia

San Pedro Sula
13 December 1989

Real España	1–0	Motagua

San Pedro Sula
23 December 1989

Marathón	–	Real España
	canceled

San Pedro Sula

Olimpia	2–0	Victoria

Victoria	1–1	Marathón

Victoria	1–0	Olimpia

Victoria	–	Motagua
	canceled

La Ceiba

=== Unknown rounds ===
22 March 1989

Motagua	1–1	Platense
Villalobos

Tegucigalpa
18 May 1989

Motagua	0–1	Vida
		Peri

Tegucigalpa
21 May 1989

Olimpia	1–1	Sula
		Róchez

Tegucigalpa
24 May 1989

Real España	1–1	Motagua

San Pedro Sula
28 May 1989

Victoria	1–1	Marathón
Lanza

La Ceiba
4 June 1989

Olimpia	3–0	Vida

Tegucigalpa
10 June 1989

Marathón	1–1	Sula

San Pedro Sula
6 July 1989

Motagua	1–2	Olimpia

Tegucigalpa
9 July 1989

Súper Estrella	5–2	Curacao

Danlí
18 October 1989

Motagua	2–1	Vida
		Mckenzie

Tegucigalpa
