= 1988 Honduran Segunda División =

Honduran Segunda División
- Season: 1988–89
- Champions: Súper Estrella
- Promoted: Súper Estrella
- All statistics correct as of 18 December 1988.

The 1988 Honduran Segunda División was the 22nd season of the Honduran Segunda División. Under the management of Roy Posas, Súper Estrella won the tournament after finishing first in the final round (or Cuadrangular) and obtained promotion to the 1989–90 Honduran Liga Nacional.

== Final round ==
Also known as Cuadrangular.

=== Standings ===
Pos	Team	Pld	W	D	L	GF	GA	GD	Pts	Promotion
1	Súper Estrella	0	0	0	0	0	0	0	0	Promotion to Liga Nacional
2	Modernic	0	0	0	0	0	0	0	0	
3	missing	0	0	0	0	0	0	0	0	
4	missing	0	0	0	0	0	0	0	0	

=== Known results ===
18 December 1988	Súper Estrella	4–0	Modernic	Danlí, El Paraíso
				Stadium: Estadio Marcelo Tinoco
