= Eugenio Dolmo Flores =

Honduran footballer (born 1965)

Dolmo Flores
Personal information
- Full name: Mario Eugenio Dolmo Flores
- Date of birth: July 31, 1965 (age 61)
- Place of birth: Puerto Cortés, Honduras
- Position: Striker

Senior career*
Years	Team	Apps	(Gls)
1983–1985	Platense	74	(10)
1985–1986	Suchitepequez		
1986–1988	Olimpia		
1989–1992	Santos Laguna	94	(19)
1992–1993	Petrotela		
1993–1994	Alajuelense	22	(9)
1994	Universitario		(10)
1995–1999	Olimpia		(23)
1999–2001	Victoria		(4)
2001	Broncos		
2002–2003	Isidro Metapán		
2003	Real Estelí		

International career^{‡}
1988–1997	Honduras	42	(6)
- * Club domestic league appearances and goals as of 24 May 2013 ‡ National team caps and goals as of 24 May 2013

Mario Eugenio Dolmo Flores (born 31 July 1965) is a retired Honduran footballer.

== Club career ==
Born in Puerto Cortés, Flores began his footballing career at local side Platense. He soon arrived to renowned Olimpia, where he would make his name later leaving for Santos Laguna. In November 2012 he was nominated to become a "Guerrero de Honor" (Warrior of Honour) of Santos.

He also had a season in Peru with Universitario, where he played alongside compatriot César Obando, and in Costa Rica with Alajuelense. After a few seasons back in Honduras he retired after playing on 26 May 2001 for Broncos then moved abroad again to play in El Salvador with Isidro Metapán in the 2002 Clausura.

He was later dismissed by Nicaraguans Real Estelí in October 2003 and duly finished his career. He played with Alex Pineda Chacón, Danilo Galindo, Juan Carlos Espinoza, Nahúm Espinoza and Belarmino Rivera in the Olimpia and they won the CONCACAF Champions League in 1988.

== International career ==
A left-sided forward, Flores made his debut for Honduras in the late 1980s and has earned a total of 42 caps, scoring 6 goals. He has represented his country in 12 FIFA World Cup qualification matches and played at the 1993 UNCAF Nations Cup as well as at the 1991 and 1993 CONCACAF Gold Cups.

=== International goals ===
Scores and results list Honduras' goal tally first.

N.	Date	Venue	Opponent	Score	Result	Competition
1.	28 June 1991	Memorial Coliseum, Los Angeles, United States	Canada	4–0	4-2	1991 CONCACAF Gold Cup
2.	5 July 1991	Memorial Coliseum, Los Angeles, United States	Costa Rica	2–0	2-0	1991 CONCACAF Gold Cup
3.	8 November 1992	Estadio Nacional de Costa Rica (1924), San José, Costa Rica	Costa Rica	1–2	3-2	1994 FIFA World Cup qualification
4.	8 June 1994	Jack Murphy Stadium, San Diego, United States	Brazil	2–5	2–8	Friendly match
5.	26 January 1997	Estadio Nacional, Santiago, Chile	Chile	1–1	2–3	Friendly match
6.	26 January 1997	Estadio Nacional, Santiago, Chile	Chile	2–3	2–3	Friendly match

== Personal life ==
Dolmo Flores is married to Brenda.

== Honours and awards ==
=== Club ===
C.D. Olimpia

- Liga Profesional de Honduras (5): 1987–88, 1989–90, 1992–93, 1995–96, 1996–97
- Honduran Cup: (2): 1995, 1998
- Honduran Supercup: (1): 1997
- CONCACAF Champions League (1): 1988

=== Country ===
Honduras

- Copa Centroamericana (1): 1993,
