= David Maldonado González =

Mexican politician (born 1967)

- Born: 1 July 1967 (age 59); Baja California, Mexico
- Education: UABC
- Occupation: Politician
- Political party: PAN
- Children: 2

David Maldonado González (born 1 July 1967) is a Mexican politician from the National Action Party. From 2006 to 2009, he served as Deputy of the LX Legislature of the Mexican Congress representing Baja California.
