= Gilberto Machado =

Honduran footballer (born 1962)

Leonel Machado
Personal information
- Full name: Gilberto Leonel Machado García
- Date of birth: 23 March 1962 (age 64)
- Place of birth: San Pedro Sula, Honduras
- Positions: Centre midfielder; attacking midfielder

Team information
- Current team: Olimpia Occidental

Senior career*
Years	Team	Apps	(Gls)
1979–1991	Marathón	261	(78)
1992	Olimpia	8	(4)
1993–1994	Deportes Progreseño		

International career
1987–1992	Honduras	4	(1)

Managerial career
- 2002: Marathón
- Real España
- Honduras Progreso
- 2013–: Sula de La Lima
- * Club domestic league appearances and goals

Gilberto Leonel Machado García (born 23 March 1962) is a retired Honduran footballer who played as a midfielder for Marathón, Olimpia, and Deportes Progreseño in Liga Nacional de Fútbol Profesional de Honduras.

He is the current manager of Honduran second division side Sula de La Lima.

== Club career ==
Born in San Pedro Sula, Machado played club football in Honduras. He made his debut for Marathón on 29 July 1979 against Atlético Portuario and scored his first goal on 22 February 1981 against Real España. Machado was the Honduran league's top goal-scorer in 1987, scoring 19 goals for Marathon. He is also Marathon's all-time leading goal-scorer, scoring 78 goals from 1979 to 1991.

In 1991, Machado transferred to Olimpia for one season scoring 4 goals, and then finished his career with Deportes Progreseño.

== International career ==
Machado only played a handful of matches for Honduras. His final international was a June 1991 UNCAF Nations Cup match against El Salvador.

== Career statistics ==
=== Club ===
As of match played 11 August 2014

Club	Season	League			Honduran Cup		League Cup		CONCACAF		Total	
Club	Season	Division	Apps	Goals	Apps	Goals	Apps	Goals	Apps	Goals	Apps	Goals
Marathón	1979–80	Honduran Liga Nacional	5	0	—		—		—			
Marathón	1980–81	Honduran Liga Nacional	11	0	—		—		—			
Marathón	1981–82	Honduran Liga Nacional	18	1	—		—		—			
Marathón	1982–83	Honduran Liga Nacional	18	3	—		—		—			
Marathón	1983–84	Honduran Liga Nacional	20	4	—		—		—			
Marathón	1984–85	Honduran Liga Nacional	23	7	—		—		—			
Marathón	1985–86	Honduran Liga Nacional	23	7	—		—		—			
Marathón	1986–87	Honduran Liga Nacional	22	9	—		—		—			
Marathón	1987–88	Honduran Liga Nacional	35	19	—		—		—			
Marathón	1988–89	Honduran Liga Nacional	30	7	—		—		—			
Marathón	1989–90	Honduran Liga Nacional	29	8	—		—		—			
Marathón	1990–91	Honduran Liga Nacional	27	8	—		—		—			
Marathón	1991–92	Honduran Liga Naciona	22	5	—		—		—			
Total			261	78	0	0	0	0	0	0	261	78
Career total			261	78	0	0	0	0	0	0	261	78

=== International goals ===
N.	Date	Venue	Opponent	Score	Result	Competition
1	2 June 1991	Estadio Ricardo Saprissa, San José, United States	El Salvador	2–0	2–0	1991 UNCAF Nations Cup

== Managerial career ==
After he retired from playing, Machado became a football coach. He has managed Honduras Progreso in the Liga Nacional de Ascenso de Honduras.

== Personal life ==
Machado is married to Nancy Sobeyda Quintero and the couple have two kids: Leonel Alberto and Andrea Fabiola.
