= Palic Castillo =

Honduran footballer (born 1965)

Personal information
- Full name: Ciro Paulino Castillo Valerio
- Date of birth: 7 September 1965 (age 61)
- Place of birth: Honduras
- Position: Striker

Senior career*
Years	Team	Apps	(Gls)
1983–1997	Marathón		(35)
1991–1992	Real España		(13)
1993–1994	Alajuelense		
1994–1995	Cartaginés		

International career
1991–1993	Honduras	9	(1)
- * Club domestic league appearances and goals

Ciro Paulino "Palic" Castillo Valerio (born 7 September 1965) is a retired Honduran football player who played for the national team in the 1990s.

== Club career ==
Nicknamed Palic, Castillo scored 35 league goals for Honduran side Marathón and another 13 with Real España over a 10-year period. He also scored 10 goals in 76 games in the Costa Rican league with Alajuelense and Cartaginés.

== International career ==
Castillo made his debut for Honduras in a May 1991 UNCAF Nations Cup match against Panama and has earned a total of 9 caps, scoring 1 goal. He has represented his country at that one tournament, the 1991 UNCAF Nations Cup.

His final international was a January 1993 friendly match against Bolivia.

== Retirement ==
In June 2010, Castillo rejoined his old club Marathón to become a reserves trainer and talent scout.
