= Raúl Martínez Sambulá =

Honduran footballer (born 1963)

Personal information
- Full name: Raúl Martínez Sambulá
- Date of birth: 14 March 1963 (age 63)
- Place of birth: Tela, Honduras
- Position: Defender

Youth career
- Vida

Senior career*
Years	Team	Apps	(Gls)
1984–1988	Olimpia		
1988–1994	UA Tamaulipas	192	(7)
1994–1997	Victoria		

International career
1988–1996	Honduras	30	(0)

Managerial career
- 2000: Victoria
- 2004: Honduras
- 2008: San Luis (assistant)
- 2009: UA Tamaulipas
- 2010–2011: Hispano
- 2012: Real Sociedad
- 2013–2014: Águila
- 2014: Deportes Savio
- 2015–2016: Lobos UPNFM
- 2016–2017: Victoria
- 2018–2019: Vida
- 2024-present: San Juan Huracán
- * Club domestic league appearances and goals

Raúl Martínez Sambulá (born 14 March 1963) is a Honduran former professional football player, who made his name with the national team in the early 1990s.

== Club career ==
Martínez Sambulá started his career at Olimpia and then moved abroad for a lengthy spell at Mexican side UA Tamaulipas. He returned to Honduras in 1994 to finish his career at Victoria. In April 1986 he helped set Francisco Adelmo Herrera's record of 7 successive clean sheets when he scored in the 30th minute of Herrera's 8th game.

== International career ==
Martínez Sambulá made his debut for Honduras in the late 1980s and has earned a total of 28 caps, scoring no goals. He has represented his country in 9 FIFA World Cup qualification matches and played at the 1995 UNCAF Nations Cup, as well as at the 1991, and 1996 CONCACAF Gold Cups.

His final international was an August 1996 friendly match against El Salvador.

== Managerial career ==
After he quit playing he went into management and was assistant to Honduras national coach Bora Milutinovic in 2004 and taking over for 5 matches after Bora's dismissal. In 2009, he became in charge of his former Mexican team UA Tamaulipas. He also managed Hispano and with Real Sociedad he won promotion to the national league in summer 2012, but was dismissed in November 2012 when results then went the wrong way. He has also managed Victoria, Platense, Vida and Olimpia. In September 2013, Sambulá replaced Vladan Vicevic in the hot seat at Águila.

== Personal life ==
Born to Marcos and Justina Martínez, Raúl was one of 12 children and five brothers who have played in the Honduran national league: Apollonio played at Atlántida, Olimpia and Atlético Portuario, Rudy at Universidad, Dagoberto played at Broncos and Fernando was part of Sula. There is even a sixth brother who played football, Mario, but he played in the second division with Curaçao. He is married to Mercy Yamileth and has three daughters with her and another before he got married.

== Honours ==
C.D. Olimpia

- Liga Profesional de Honduras: 1984–85, 1986–87, 1987–88

C.D. Victoria

- Liga Profesional de Honduras: 1994–95

Honduras

- Copa Centroamericana: 1995
