= Celso Güity =

Honduran footballer (1958–2021)

Personal information
- Full name: Celso Fredy Güity Núñez
- Date of birth: 13 July 1958
- Place of birth: Honduras
- Date of death: 12 February 2021 (aged 62)
- Place of death: Miami, Florida, U.S.
- Position: Forward

Senior career*
Years	Team	Apps	(Gls)
1978–1984	Marathón	71	(13)
1984–1985	Sula	13	(0)
Total		84	(13)

International career
	Honduras	11	(0)
- * Club domestic league appearances and goals

Celso Fredy Güity Núñez (13 July 1958 – 12 February 2021) was a Honduran footballer who played as a forward for Honduras in the 1982 FIFA World Cup.

== Club career ==
Güity played six years for Marathón and also had a season at Sula.

== Personal life ==
Güity worked in construction in New York after his football career. He died of bone cancer in Miami in February 2021.
