= E.A.C.I. =

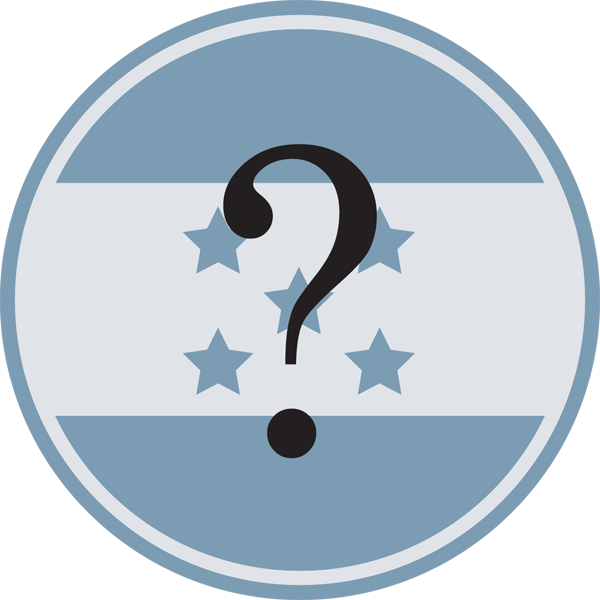
- Full name: Club Deportivo Empresa Asociativa Campesina de Isletas
- Ground: Estadio San Jorge, Olanchito, Honduras
- Capacity: 3,000
Home colours	Away colours	Third colours

E.A.C.I. (La Empresa Asociativa Campesina de Isletas) was a Honduran football club, based in Olanchito, Honduras.

They played their home games at the Estadio San Jorge although they were formed in Isletas.

== History ==
The club played two seasons in the Honduran national league from 1986 to 1988.

== Achievements ==
- Segunda División

Winners (1): 1985

== See also ==
- Football in Honduras
