= Rudy Williams (footballer) =

Honduran footballer (born 1965)

Personal information
- Full name: Rudy Alberto Williams
- Date of birth: July 25, 1965 (age 61)
- Place of birth: Honduras
- Position: Defender

Senior career*
Years	Team	Apps	(Gls)
1983–1987	Vida		(12)
1988–2000	Olimpia		(17)
1994–1995	ADET		
2001–2002	Universidad		(1)

International career^{‡}
1985	Honduras U-20		
1986	Honduras U-21		
1987	Honduras U-23		
1992–1995	Honduras	12	(1)
- * Club domestic league appearances and goals as of 11 January 2013 ‡ National team caps and goals as of 11 January 2013

Rudy Alberto Williams (born 25 August 1965) is a retired Honduran football defender, who played most of his career for Olimpia in the Honduran Liga Nacional.

== Club career ==
Williams also played for Vida, Pumas UNAH and Salvadoran club ADET. He is most famous for scoring the winning goal against Real España in the 1989–90 final that gave Olimpia its 10th national title.

== International career ==
Williams made his senior debut for Honduras in a September 1992 friendly match against El Salvador and has earned a total of 12 caps, scoring 1 goal. He has represented his country in 1 FIFA World Cup qualification match and played at the 1995 UNCAF Nations Cup.

His final international was a December 1995 UNCAF Nations Cup match against Guatemala.

=== International goals ===
Scores and results list Honduras' goal tally first.

N.	Date	Venue	Opponent	Score	Result	Competition
1.	7 December 1995	Estadio de la Flor Blanca, San Salvador, El Salvador	Costa Rica	1–1	1–1	1995 UNCAF Nations Cup

== Retirement ==
After he quit playing, Williams lived in the United States for several years where he learned painting houses, a job he now has in Honduras.

== Honours and awards ==
=== Club ===
C.D. Olimpia

- Liga Profesional de Honduras (3): 1989–90, 1996–97, 1998–99
- Honduran Cup: (2): 1995, 1998
- Honduran Supercup: (1): 1997

C.D.S. Vida

- Liga Profesional de Honduras (1): 1983–84

=== Country ===
Honduras

- Copa Centroamericana (1): 1995
