= Atlético Morazán =

Atrlético Morazán
- Full name: Atlético Morazán Futbol Club
- Nickname(s): Morazánas
- Founded: 1970
- Ground: Estadio Tiburcio Carías Andino, Tegucigalpa, Honduras
- Capacity: 35,000
- League: Liga de Ascenso
Home colours	Away colours	Third colours

Atlético Morazán was a Honduran football club. It was based in Tegucigalpa, Honduras.

== History ==
The club was promoted from the Second Division to the Liga Nacional on 23 December 1979. The club was known as Atlético Fusep at the time.

=== Juventud Morazánica ===
Atlético Morazán changed its name to Juventud Morazanica in 1983 after a merger with Juventud Ribereña.

Sula bought Juventud Morazanica's franchise in 1985.

== Achievements ==
- Liga Nacional

Runners-up (1): 1981–82

- Segunda División

Winners (1): 1979
