= Nahúm Espinoza =

Honduran footballer and manager (born 1964)

Nahún Espinoza
Personal information
- Full name: Nahún Alberto Espinoza Zerón
- Date of birth: 14 August 1964 (age 62)
- Place of birth: Tela, Honduras
- Height: 1.77 m (5 ft 10 in)

Team information
- Current team: Olimpia (Head coach)

Senior career*
Years	Team	Apps	(Gls)
1982–1987	Real España	109	(6)
1988–2000	Olimpia	247	(31)

International career
1994	Honduras	1	(0)

Managerial career
- 2005–2007: Olimpia
- 2008–2009: Platense
- 2009–2010: Vida (technical advisor)
- 2011: Victoria
- 2012: UPNFM
- 2012: Real España
- 2015: Xelajú MC
- 2018–2019: Olimpia
- * Club domestic league appearances and goals

Nahún Alberto Espinoza Zerón (born 14 August 1964) is a retired Honduran football player and football manager, who currently is in charge of Club Deportivo Olimpia.

== Club career ==
He started his career at Real España and also had a lengthy spell with Olimpia, winning 5 league titles. He played with Alex Pineda Chacón, Belarmino Rivera, Eugenio Dolmo Flores, Danilo Galindo and his brother Juan Carlos Espinoza in the Olimpia and they won the CONCACAF Champions League in 1988

== International career ==
Espinoza made his debut for Honduras in a December 1994 friendly match against the United States, coming on as a late substitute for Mario Peri. It proved to be his sole international game.

== Managerial career ==
He has coached Platense and Olimpia, with whom he won three consecutive titles. He also was technical advisor at Vida and shortly manager of Victoria and Second Division side UPNFM.

In September 2012, Espinoza succeeded Chelato Uclés as manager of Real España, with his brother Juan Carlos named as his assistant. He however announced in November 2012 to leave the club after the season.

== Personal life ==
Nahún is the younger brother of former international midfielder Juan Carlos Espinoza. Their brother Enrique, who died in April 2012, was also a former player of Olimpia.

== Honours and awards ==
=== Club ===
C.D. Olimpia

- Liga Profesional de Honduras (5): 1989–90, 1992–93, 1995–96, 1996–97, 1998–99
- Honduran Cup: (2): 1995, 1998
- Honduran Supercup: (1): 1997
- Copa Interclubes UNCAF (1): 1999, 2000
- CONCACAF Champions League (1): 1988

C.D. Real Espana

- Copa Interclubes UNCAF (1): 1982
