= C.D. Sula de La Lima =

Honduran football club

Sula
- Full name: Club Deportivo Sula
- Nickname(s): Los Canarios
- Ground: Estadio Milton Flores
- Chairman: Cesar Fúnez
- Coach: Gilberto Machado
- League: Liga de Ascenso de Honduras
Home colours	Away colours

Club Deportivo Sula is a Honduran football club based on La Lima, Honduras.

== History ==
They were promoted to first division in 1984–85, the next season they bought Juventud Morazanica's franchise and changed their name to Juventud de Sula. In 1986–87 they changed their name back to just Sula and stayed like that until they were relegated in 1990–91.

In 2011, Sula reemerged in Liga de Ascenso (just like Honduras-Progreso), causing happiness amongst old fans in La Lima. They immediately won their first game against Villanueva F.C.

Before the beginning of the professional league, Sula won an amateur title in 1950–51.

== Achievements ==
- Segunda División

Winners (1): 1983

- Amateur League

Winners (1): 1951–52

- Cortés Championship

Winners (3): 1950, 1951, 1954

== League performance ==
Regular season											Post season								
Season	Pos	P	W	D	L	F	A	PTS	+/-	Ded.	Pos	P	W	D	L	F	A	PTS	+/-
1984–85	10th	36	8	12	16	27	41	28	-14	–	Did not enter								
1985–86	8th	18	4	7	7	10	16	15	-6	–	Did not enter								
1986–87	8th	27	6	10	11	27	39	22	-12	–	Did not enter								
1987–88	5th	27	6	16	5	22	18	28	+4	–	3rd	8	2	4	2	2	2	8	0
1988–89	7th	27	7	9	11	28	34	23	-6	–	Did not enter								
1989–90	8th	27	4	13	10	11	18	21	-7	–	8th	2	1	1	0	2	1	3	+1
1990–91	10th	27	5	8	14	18	33	18	-15	–	Did not enter								
1991-92	10th	27	5	8	14	18	33	18	-15	–	Did not enter								

- In 1985–86 as Juventud de Sula.

== Trivia ==
- Sula was the first Honduran club to play outside Honduras in 1939, they defeated Tipografía Nacional in Guatemala 2–1 with two goals from Neto Budde and Raúl Guardiola
