= Álex Pineda Chacón =

Honduran footballer (born 1969)

Personal information
- Full name: Álex Mauricio Pineda Chacón
- Date of birth: 19 December 1969 (age 56)
- Place of birth: Santa Cruz de Yojoa, Honduras
- Height: 1.73 m (5 ft 8 in)
- Position: Attacking midfielder

Senior career*
Years	Team	Apps	(Gls)
1988–1993	Olimpia	58	(28)
1993–1994	UA Tamaulipas	16	(3)
1994	Sporting Cristal		
1995–1998	Olimpia	41	(18)
1998–1999	UA Tamaulipas		
1999–2000	Olimpia	30	(6)
2001	Miami Fusion	25	(19)
2002	New England Revolution	20	(2)
2003	Los Angeles Galaxy	6	(0)
2003	Columbus Crew	8	(0)
2003–2004	Atlanta Silverbacks	75	(7)

International career
1992–2000	Honduras	45	(5)

Managerial career
- 2007–2008: Atlanta Silverbacks (assistant)
- 2011: Atlanta Silverbacks (assistant)
- 2012: Atlanta Silverbacks
- * Club domestic league appearances and goals

Álex Mauricio Pineda Chacón (born 19 December 1969) is a Honduran retired footballer who played as a midfielder.

== Professional career ==
Chacón spent most of his career with Club Olimpia of Honduras, joining the side in 1988, and leading the team to two Honduran championships and a CONCACAF Champions' Cup in 1988. He later played with UA Tamaulipas of Mexico during the 1993–94 season, and then for Sporting Cristal of Peru during the 1994–95 season, appearing in four Copa Libertadores matches.

In 2001, Chacón joined Major League Soccer side Miami Fusion. During the 2001 season, Chacón played a crucial attacking role on a team stacked with offensive talent, including Preki, Diego Serna, Ian Bishop, and Chris Henderson. Chacón registered 19 goals and 9 assists for the team and led the league in goals and points. He was recognized with the MLS Most Valuable Player Award.

The Fusion were contracted after the 2001 season along with the Tampa Bay Mutiny, and he was unable to recapture the form that served him well in his first year. He was selected by the New England Revolution in the 2002 MLS Dispersal Draft, but the emergence of Taylor Twellman and the arrival of a new manager Steve Nicol led to a diminished role on the squad for Chacón. He moved to the Los Angeles Galaxy after the 2002 season and soon later to the Columbus Crew, but neither move reinvigorated his career.

After the 2003 season, Chacón, without a place in MLS, moved to the American A-League, where he found plenty of playing time for the Atlanta Silverbacks. Although he only registered 3 goals and 2 assists in 2004, Chacón's leadership was recognized with a selection to the A-League All-League first team.

== International career ==
Pineda Chacón made his debut for Honduras in a December 1992 FIFA World Cup qualification match against Costa Rica and has earned a total of 45 caps, scoring 5 goals. He has represented his country in 12 FIFA World Cup qualification matches and played at the 1993 UNCAF Nations Cup as well as at the 1993, 1996, 1998 and 2000 CONCACAF Gold Cups.

His final international was an April 2000 FIFA World Cup qualification against Nicaragua.

=== International goals ===
N.	Date	Venue	Opponent	Score	Result	Competition
1	18 April 1993	Swangard Stadium, Burnaby, Canada	Canada	1–0	1–3	1994 FIFA World Cup qualification
2	10 July 1993	Cotton Bowl, Dallas, USA	Panama	3–1	5–1	1993 CONCACAF Gold Cup
3	17 November 1998	Los Angeles Memorial Coliseum, Los Angeles, USA	Guatemala	3–3	3–3	Hurricane Relief Tournament
4	18 November 1998	Los Angeles Memorial Coliseum, Los Angeles, USA	El Salvador	2–1	2–1	Hurricane Relief Tournament
5	4 March 2000	Estadio Francisco Morazán, San Pedro Sula, Honduras	Nicaragua	1–0	3–0	2002 FIFA World Cup qualification

== Coaching career ==
Chacón joined the Silverbacks as an assistant coach in 2007. The squad when on hiatus for the 2008 and 2009 seasons, but Chacón remained in the role. While the club was being restructured, he coached youth soccer club Forsyth Fusion, now known as the United Futbol Academy.

After four years with the club as an assistant, he was named head coach on 7 November 2011.

Álex Pineda Chacón has been released from his duties Coaching the Silverbacks in June 2012 after an unsuccessful season.

== Personal life ==
Chacón has now settled in Georgia with his wife and two daughters.

== Honours and awards ==
=== Country ===
Honduras

- Copa Centroamericana (1): 1993

=== Club ===
C.D. Olimpia

- Liga Profesional de Honduras (4): 1989–90, 1992–93, 1996–97, 1998–99
- Honduran Cup: (2): 1995, 1998
- Honduran Supercup: (1): 1997
- CONCACAF Champions' Cup (1): 1988

Sporting Cristal

- Torneo Descentralizado (2): 1994, 1995

=== Individual ===
- Liga Nacional de Honduras Top Scorer (1): 1993–94
- MLS Most Valuable Player (1): 2001
- MLS Golden Boot (1): 2001
- MLS Scoring Champion (1): 2001
- MLS Best XI (1): 2001
- MLS Fair Play Award (1): 2001
