= 1988 CONCACAF Champions' Cup =

24th edition of premier club football tournament organized by CONCACAF

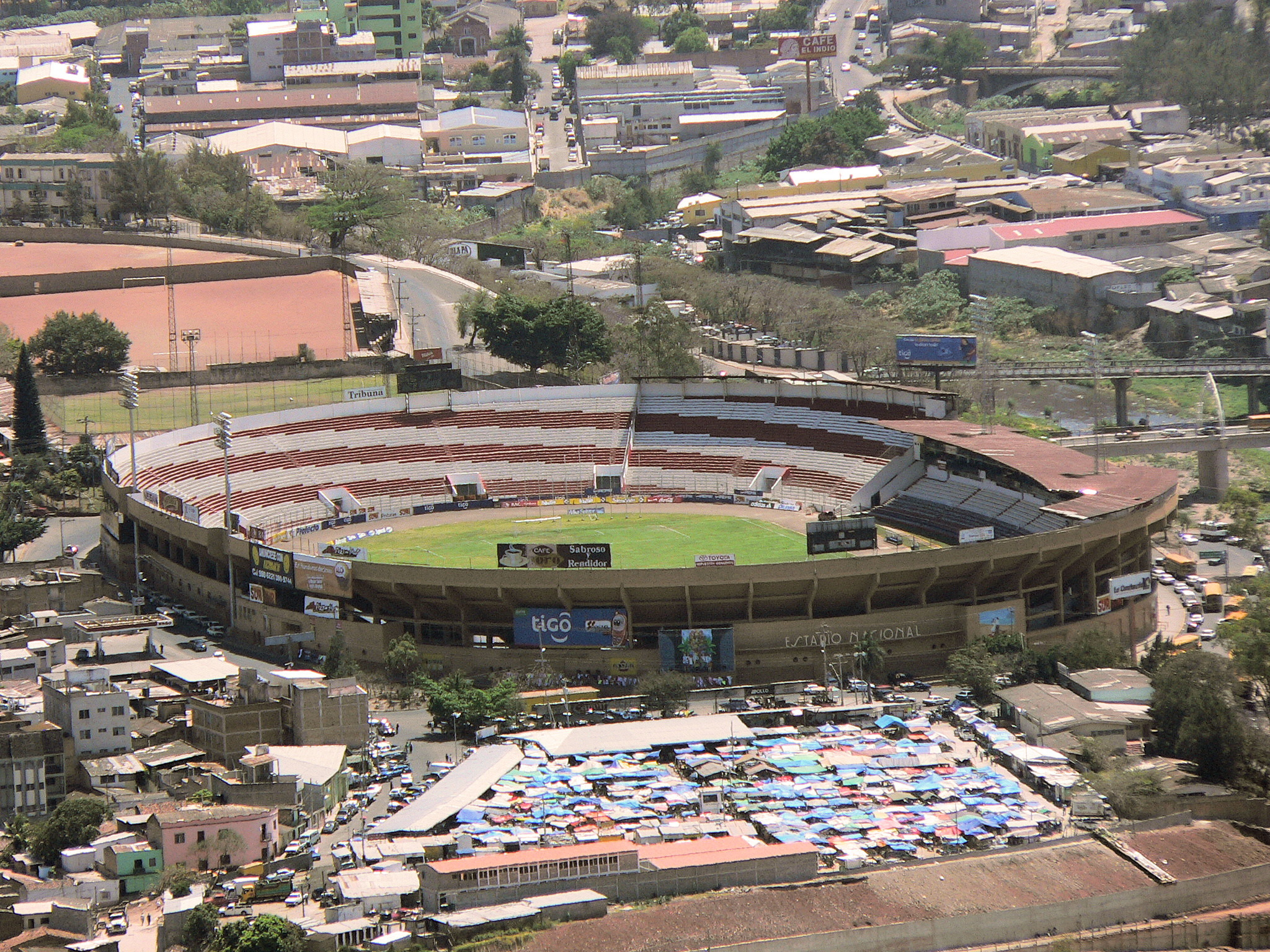
- Estadio Nacional in Tegucigalpa hosted the final round

Tournament details
- Dates: 30 November – 21 December
- Teams: 4 (from 4 associations)

Final positions
- Champions: (Honduras) Olimpia (2nd title)
- Runners-up: (Trinidad and Tobago) Defence Force

Tournament statistics
- Matches played: 6
- Goals scored: 9 (1.5 per match)

The 1988 CONCACAF Champions' Cup was the 24th. edition of the annual international club football competition held in the CONCACAF region (North America, Central America and the Caribbean), the CONCACAF Champions' Cup. It determined that year's club champion of association football in the CONCACAF region and was played from 11 March till 21 December 1988.

The teams were split in 2 zones, North/Central America and Caribbean, (as North and Central America sections combined to qualify one team for the final), each one qualifying two teams to the final tournament.

Hondurean club Olimpia beat Trinidarian side Defence Force 4–0 on aggregate to become champions, thus achieving their second CONCACAF trophy. This is the last time to date a Central American team outside of Costa Rica has won the continental title.

== North/Central American Zone ==
=== Preliminary round ===
Team 1	Agg.	Team 2	1st leg	2nd leg
Morelia (Mexico)	11 - 0	(Belize) Coke Milpross	9 - 0	2 - 0
Real Verdes (Belize)	2 - 14	(Mexico) Cruz Azul	0 - 2	2 - 12
Plaza Amador (Panama)	1 - 4	(Costa Rica) Alajuelense	0 - 2	1 - 2

- Morelia, Cruz Azul and Alajuelense advance to the First Round.

Morelia (Mexico)	9–0	(Belize) Coke Milpross	Morelia, Mexico
			Stadium: Estadio Venustiano Carranza

Coke Milpross	0-2 (0-11 agg.)	(Mexico) Morelia	Belize City, Belize
			Stadium: MCC Grounds

Real Verdes (Belize)	0-2	(Mexico) Cruz Azul	San Ignacio, Belize
			Stadium: Norman Broaster Stadium

Cruz Azul (Mexico)	12–2 (14-2 agg.)	(Belize) Real Verdes	Jasso, Mexico
			Stadium: Estadio 10 de Diciembre

June 5, 1988	Plaza Amador (Panama)	0-2	(Costa Rica) Alajuelense	Panama City, Panama
			Omar Arroyo; Roberto Stevenovich	Stadium: Estadio Rommel Fernández

Alajuelense (Costa Rica)	2–1 (3-1 agg.)	(Panama) Plaza Amador	San José, Costa Rica
			Stadium: Estadio Alejandro Morera Soto

=== First round ===
==== North American Zone ====
Team 1	Agg.	Team 2	1st leg	2nd leg
Cruz Azul (Mexico)	9 - 0	(United States) Seattle Mitre Eagles	9 - 0	0 - 0
Washington Diplomats (United States)	2 - 4	(Mexico) Morelia	1 - 2	1 - 2

- Morelia and Cruz Azul advance to Fourth Round.

Cruz Azul (Mexico)	9–0	(United States) Seattle Mitre Eagles	Jasso, Mexico
			Stadium: Estadio 10 de Diciembre

Seattle Mitre Eagles (United States)	0–0 (0-9 agg.)	(Mexico) Cruz Azul	Seattle, United States
			Stadium: Memorial Stadium; Attendance: 500

Washington Diplomats (United States)	1–2	(Mexico) Morelia	Washington, D.C., United States
			Stadium: RFK Stadium

Morelia (Mexico)	2–1 (4-2 agg.)	(United States) Washington Diplomats	Washington, D.C., United States
			Stadium: RFK Stadium

==== Central American Zone ====
Played in Estadio Doroteo Guamuch Flores - Guatemala City, Guatemala

Team	Pld	W	D	L	GF	GA	GD	Pts
(Costa Rica) Alajuelense	3	2	1	0	4	2	+2	5
(Honduras) Marathón	3	2	0	1	3	1	+2	4
(Guatemala) Municipal	3	1	1	1	4	4	0	3
(El Salvador) Águila	3	0	0	3	2	6	−4	0

Team 1	Score	Team 2
Alajuelense (Costa Rica)	2–1	(El Salvador) Águila
Municipal (Guatemala)	0–2	(Honduras) Marathón
Marathón (Honduras)	1–0	(El Salvador) Águila
Municipal (Guatemala)	1–1	(Costa Rica) Alajuelense
Alajuelense (Costa Rica)	1–0	(Honduras) Marathón
Municipal (Guatemala)	3–1	(El Salvador) Águila

*Alajuelense and Marathon advance to the Third Round.

June 26, 1988	Alajuelense (Costa Rica)	2–1	(El Salvador) Águila	Guatemala City, Guatemala
	Óscar Ramírez; Alvaro Solano		Luis Ramírez Zapata

June 26, 1988	Municipal (Guatemala)	0–2	(Honduras) Marathón	Guatemala City, Guatemala
			Ciro Castillo

Marathón (Honduras)	1–0	(El Salvador) Águila	Guatemala City, Guatemala

Municipal (Guatemala)	1–1	(Costa Rica) Alajuelense	Guatemala City, Guatemala

July 3, 1988	Alajuelense (Costa Rica)	1–0	(Honduras) Marathón	Guatemala City, Guatemala
	Ricardo Chacón 43'

July 3, 1988	Municipal (Guatemala)	3–1	(El Salvador) Águila	Guatemala City, Guatemala
	Julio Gómez; Juan Carlos Carreño (o.g.); René Archilla		Luis Enrique Guelmo

==== Central American Zone ====
Played in Estadio Nacional Chelato Uclés - Tegucigalpa, Honduras

Team	Pld	W	D	L	GF	GA	GD	Pts
(Honduras) Olimpia	3	2	1	0	6	2	+4	5
(Guatemala) Aurora	3	1	2	0	4	2	+2	4
(El Salvador) FAS	3	0	2	1	4	6	−2	2
(Costa Rica) Municipal Puntarenas	3	0	1	2	2	6	−4	1

Team 1	Score	Team 2
Aurora (Guatemala)	2–0	(Costa Rica) Municipal Puntarenas
Olimpia (Honduras)	3–1	(El Salvador) FAS
Municipal Puntarenas (Costa Rica)	2–2	(El Salvador) FAS
Olimpia (Honduras)	1–1	(Guatemala) Aurora
Aurora (Guatemala)	1–1	(El Salvador) FAS
Olimpia (Honduras)	2–0	(Costa Rica) Municipal Puntarenas

*Olimpia and Aurora advance to the Third Round.

June 26, 1988	Aurora (Guatemala)	2–0	(Costa Rica) Municipal Puntarenas	Tegucigalpa, Honduras
	José Luis González			Stadium: Estadio Nacional; Attendance: 22,000

June 26, 1988	Olimpia (Honduras)	3–1	(El Salvador) FAS	Tegucigalpa, Honduras
	Belammino Rivera; Juan Carlos Espinoza; Rudy Williams		Hugo Francisco Gudiel	Stadium: Estadio Nacional; Attendance: 22,143

Municipal Puntarenas (Costa Rica)	2–2	(El Salvador) FAS	Tegucigalpa, Honduras
Didier Morales; Luis Árnaez		Luis Guerrero	Stadium: Estadio Nacional

Olimpia (Honduras)	1–1	(Guatemala) Aurora	Tegucigalpa, Honduras
			Stadium: Estadio Nacional

July 3, 1988	Aurora (Guatemala)	1–1	(El Salvador) FAS	Tegucigalpa, Honduras
	Óscar Sánchez			Stadium: Estadio Nacional

July 3, 1988	Olimpia (Honduras)	2–0	(Costa Rica) Municipal Puntarenas	Tegucigalpa, Honduras
	Juan Carlos Contreras; Raúl Martínez Sambulá			Stadium: Estadio Nacional

=== Second round ===
==== Central American Zone ====
Played in Estadio Nacional Chelato Uclés - Tegucigalpa, Honduras

Team	Pld	W	D	L	GF	GA	GD	Pts
(Costa Rica) Alajuelense	3	1	2	0	4	2	+2	4
(Honduras) Olimpia	3	1	2	0	3	2	+1	4
(Guatemala) Aurora	3	0	2	1	2	3	−1	2
(Honduras) Marathón	3	1	0	2	3	5	−2	2

Team 1	Score	Team 2
Olimpia (Honduras)	0 - 0	(Guatemala) Aurora
Marathón (Honduras)	0 - 2	(Costa Rica) Alajuelense
Olimpia (Honduras)	1 - 1	(Costa Rica) Alajuelense
Marathón (Honduras)	2 - 1	(Guatemala) Aurora
Alajuelense (Costa Rica)	1 - 1	(Guatemala) Aurora
Olimpia (Honduras)	2 - 1	(Honduras) Marathón

*Alajuelense and Olimpia advance to the Fourth Round.

Olimpia (Honduras)	0–0	(Guatemala) Aurora

Marathón (Honduras)	0–2	(Costa Rica) Alajuelense

Olimpia (Honduras)	1–1	(Costa Rica) Alajuelense

Marathón (Honduras)	2–1	(Guatemala) Aurora

Alajuelense (Costa Rica)	1–1	(Guatemala) Aurora

Olimpia (Honduras)	2–1	(Honduras) Marathón

=== Third round ===
==== North/Central American Zone ====
Team 1	Agg.	Team 2	1st leg	2nd leg
Olimpia (Honduras)	2–1	(Mexico) Cruz Azul	0–0	2–1
Alajuelense (Costa Rica)	w/o*	(Mexico) Morelia		

- Olimpia and Alajuelense advance to the CONCACAF Semi-Finals.

- Morelia disqualified after refusing to play the series.*

Olimpia (Honduras)	0–0	(Mexico) Cruz Azul	Tegucigalpa, Honduras
			Stadium: Estadio Nacional Chelato Uclés

Cruz Azul (Mexico)	1–2 (1–2 agg.)	(Honduras) Olimpia	Mexico City, Mexico
			Stadium: Estadio Azteca

== Caribbean Zone ==
=== First round ===
Matches and results unknown:
(Guadeloupe) Zenith
(Suriname) Robinhood
(Saint Vincent and the Grenadines) Sion Hill
(Saint Vincent and the Grenadines) Cardinals

Team 1	Agg.	Team 2	1st leg	2nd leg
Centro Dominguito (Netherlands Antilles)	1 - 3	(Guadeloupe) **La Gauloise**	1 - 1	0 - 2
**Seba United** (Jamaica)	5 - 2	(Netherlands Antilles) UNDEBA	3 - 0	2 - 2
Franciscain (Martinique)	2 - 4	(Trinidad and Tobago) **Defence Force**	2 - 2	0 - 2
Trintoc (Trinidad and Tobago)	1 - 2	(Martinique) **Excelsior**	1 - 1	0 - 1
Leo Victor (Suriname)	2 - 3	(French Guiana) **Sport Guyanais**	2 - 1	0 - 2

- All clubs in BOLD advance to the second round.

**Centro Dominguito (Netherlands Antilles)**	**1–1**	**(Guadeloupe) La Gauloise**

**La Gauloise (Guadeloupe)**	**2–0** (**1-3** agg.)	**(Netherlands Antilles) Centro Dominguito**
		Nil

**Seba United (Jamaica)**	**3–0**	**(Netherlands Antilles) UNDEBA**
		Nil

**UNDEBA (Netherlands Antilles)**	**2–2** (**2-5** agg.)	**(Jamaica) Seba United**

**Franciscain (Martinique)**	**2-2**	**(Trinidad and Tobago) Defence Force**

**Defence Force (Trinidad and Tobago)**	**2–0** (**4-2** agg.)	**(Martinique) Franciscain**
		Nil

**Trintoc (Trinidad and Tobago)**	**1–1**	**(Martinique) Excelsior**

**Excelsior (Martinique)**	**1-0** (**2-1** agg.)	**(Trinidad and Tobago) Trintoc**
		Nil

**Leo Victor (Suriname)**	**2-1**	**(French Guiana) Sport Guyanais**

**Sport Guyanais (French Guiana)**	**2–0** (**3-2** agg.)	**(Suriname) Leo Victor**
		Nil

=== Second round ===
Matches and results unknown:
(Guadeloupe) La Gauloise
(Jamaica) Seba United
(French Guiana) Sport Guyanais

Team 1	Agg.	Team 2	1st leg	2nd leg
Zenith (Guadeloupe)	3 - 5	(Suriname) **Robinhood**	3 - 1	0 - 4
Sion Hill (Saint Vincent and the Grenadines)	1 - 7	(Martinique) **Excelsior**	1 - 3	0 - 4
Cardinals (Saint Vincent and the Grenadines)	0 - 1	(Trinidad and Tobago) **Defence Force**	0 - 0	0 - 1

- Further results for the following round are unknown;
  Robin Hood and Defence Force advance to the CONCACAF Semi-Finals.

**Zenith (Guadeloupe)**	**3-1**	**(Suriname) Robinhood**

**Robinhood (Suriname)**	**4-0** (**5-3** agg.)	**(Guadeloupe) Zenith**
		Nil

**Sion Hill (Saint Vincent and the Grenadines)**	**1–3**	**(Martinique) Excelsior**

**Excelsior (Martinique)**	**4-0** (**7-1** agg.)	**(Saint Vincent and the Grenadines) Sion Hill**
		Nil

**Cardinals (Saint Vincent and the Grenadines)**	**0–0**	**(Trinidad and Tobago) Defence Force**
Nil		Nil

**Defence Force (Trinidad and Tobago)**	**1-0** (**1-0** agg.)	**(Saint Vincent and the Grenadines) Cardinals**
		Nil

== Semi-finals ==
Team 1	Agg.	Team 2	1st leg	2nd leg
Olimpia (Honduras)	2–1	(Costa Rica) Alajuelense	1–1	1–0
Robinhood (Suriname)	2–3	(Trinidad and Tobago) Defence Force	1–0	1—3

- Olimpia and Defence Force advance to the CONCACAF Final.

Olimpia (Honduras)	1–1	(Costa Rica) Alajuelense	Tegucigalpa, Honduras
			Stadium: Estadio Nacional Chelato Uclés

Alajuelense (Costa Rica)	0-1 (1-2 agg.)	(Honduras) Olimpia	San José, Costa Rica
			Stadium: Estadio Alejandro Morera Soto

Robinhood (Suriname)	1–0	(Trinidad and Tobago) Defence Force	Paramaribo, Suriname
			Stadium: André Kamperveen Stadion

Defence Force (Trinidad and Tobago)	3–1 (3–2 agg.)	(Suriname) Robinhood	Paramaribo, Suriname
			Stadium: André Kamperveen Stadion

== Final ==
=== First leg ===
1988 CONCACAF Champions' Cup Final
19 December 1988
First leg

Defence Force (Trinidad and Tobago)	0–2	(Honduras) Olimpia
		Espinoza 16'; Flores 46'

Estadio Nacional, Tegucigalpa
Attendance: 21,228
Referee: Arturo Brizio (Mexico)

=== Second leg ===
21 December 1988
Second leg

Olimpia (Honduras)	2–0	(Trinidad and Tobago) Defence Force
Contreras 9'; Flores 80'	Report

Estadio Nacional, Tegucigalpa
Attendance: 17,965
Referee: Berny Ulloa Morera (Costa Rica)

Team details

Olimpia
Defence Force

GK	(Honduras) Óscar Banegas
DF	(Honduras) Daniel Zapata
DF	(Honduras) Danilo Galindo
DF	(Honduras) Alejandro Ruiz
DF	(Honduras) Rudy Williams
MF	(Honduras) Erick Fú
MF	(Honduras) Nahúm Espinoza
MF	(Honduras) Vicente Viera
MF	(Uruguay) Juan C. Contreras
FW	(Honduras) Juan Flores
FW	(Honduras) Javier Flores	(substituted off) a'
Substitutions:
DF	(Honduras) Eugenio Dolmo	(substituted on) a'
Manager:
(Uruguay) Estanislao Malinowski

GK	(Trinidad and Tobago) Hayden Thomas
DF	(Trinidad and Tobago) Julien García
DF	(Trinidad and Tobago) Miquel Payne
DF	(Trinidad and Tobago) Dexter Francis
DF	(Trinidad and Tobago) Chris Miquel
MF	(Trinidad and Tobago) Dexter Lee
MF	(Trinidad and Tobago) Troy García
MF	(Trinidad and Tobago) Hutson Charles
FW	(Trinidad and Tobago) Kerry Jamerson
FW	(Trinidad and Tobago) Richard Fraser	Substituted off
FW	(Trinidad and Tobago) Timothy Hinnes	Substituted off
Substitutions:
FW	(Trinidad and Tobago) Bertran O'Brien	Substituted on
FW	(Trinidad and Tobago) Russell Sutten	Substituted on
Manager:
(Trinidad and Tobago) Kenny Joseph

- Olimpia won 4–0 on points and also 4–0 on aggregate.

== Champion ==
CONCACAF Champions' Cup
1988 champion

Olimpia
2nd title
