= La Lima =

- Municipality
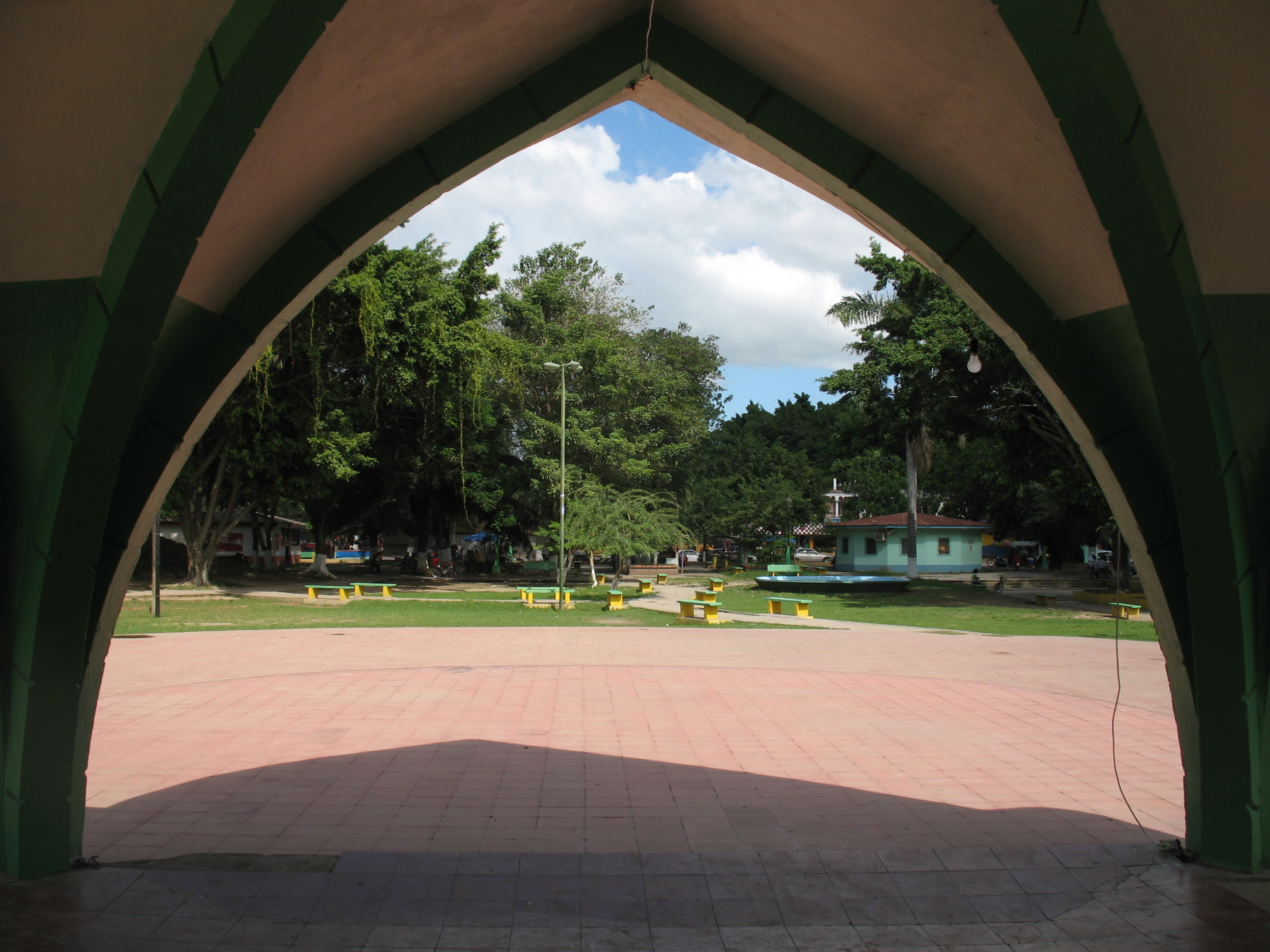

- Location within Honduras
- Coordinates: 15°25′N 87°55′W
- Country: Honduras
- Department: Cortés
- Founded: 1871; 155 years ago

Area
  - Municipality: 112 km^{2} (43 sq mi)

Population (2023 projection)
  - Municipality: 89,810
  - Density: 802/km^{2} (2,080/sq mi)
  - Urban: 83,032
- Climate: Aw
- Website: Official website

La Lima is a city, with a population of 80,740 (2023 calculation), and a municipality in the Honduran department of Cortés.

It is home to the corporate headquarters of the Tela Railroad Company, a subsidiary of Chiquita Brand. The city is divided into two cities by river Chamelecon: La Lima Vieja, located on the western side of the River and La Lima Nueva, located on the eastern side of the river. Its people are known as "limeños." For years La Lima was a city and under the municipality of San Pedro Sula.

When La Lima split from the municipality of San Pedro Sula, Fernando Ching Navarro was part of the committee in charge of the creation of the municipality of La Lima. When the municipality was created, he went on to become the first major of La Lima; he took office in 1982 and his term ended in 1986. Mr. Fernando Ching died on 17 January 2009 at the age of 84. His restaurant "Pollos La Canasta" which he established since 1969 is still running in Lima Vieja.

La Lima has a strong international presence with the FHIA (Fundación Hondureña de Investigación Agricola) plant laboratories, known before as "La Quimica" and the American Zone (La Zona Americana) built by the Chiquita banana company in the 1950s to provide housing for its first class employees e.g.: President, Vice-President, Managers, Engineers, Agronomists. The "American Zone" nowadays has a large number of foreigners still living there. In "the American Zone", is located the EILL, Escuela Internacional La Lima.

La Lima is also known as "Little New York", because over the years it has been said that if you were a great dancer, you had to be from La Lima. Also a large population of limeños have residency in New York City, especially The Bronx and Brooklyn. Most of these people come from the "Colonia Sitraterco". Recently, a large amount of limeños have been arriving to Miami. La Lima is a city where you can walk and see the activities done in the "centro".

== Geography ==
=== Climate ===
La Lima features a tropical savanna climate (Koppen Aw), with year-round relatively high temperatures and plentiful rainfall year-round. San Pedro Sula has experienced hurricanes and tropical storms and is prone to them during the hurricane season usually when the storms form in the southern part of the Caribbean or Western Africa.

Climate data for La Lima
Month	Jan	Feb	Mar	Apr	May	Jun	Jul	Aug	Sep	Oct	Nov	Dec	Year
Mean daily maximum °C (°F)	28 (82)	29 (84)	31 (88)	32 (90)	33 (91)	33 (91)	33 (91)	32 (90)	32 (90)	30 (86)	29 (84)	28 (82)	31 (88)
Mean daily minimum °C (°F)	20 (68)	21 (70)	22 (72)	23 (73)	24 (75)	24 (75)	23 (73)	23 (73)	23 (73)	23 (73)	22 (72)	21 (70)	22 (72)
Average precipitation mm (inches)	70 (2.8)	50 (2.0)	30 (1.2)	30 (1.2)	60 (2.4)	160 (6.3)	120 (4.7)	100 (3.9)	160 (6.3)	160 (6.3)	130 (5.1)	110 (4.3)	1,210 (47.6)
Mean daily sunshine hours	6	6	8	8	8	7	7	7	6	6	5	5	7
Source 1: Weatherbase
Source 2:

== Culture ==
=== Sports ===
Multiple soccer players have come out from La Lima, Carlos Pavón, Milton "Chocolate" Flores, José Luis "El Pili" Aguirre, Marco Vinicio "El Chacal" Ortega, José Luis López, Reynaldo "El Chino" Pineda, José "La Coneja" Cardona, Gilberto Yearwood.

Back in the years, La Lima had one of the most famous soccer teams in Honduras, "Sula", known as "Los Canarios". Sula were Honduras champions in the '40s, '50s. In the '80s, it was one of the teams that played the most technically beautiful soccer, it has been said that in 1987, Sula was the team to be champion, but black-hand was done between coach Nestor Matamala and Olimpia, and left Sula out of the tournament. La Lima fans supported their team in every game, they played their local games in Francisco Morazan stadium, due to the fact that they didn't have a local stadium. They had a good administration running the team, including the likes of people like the Romero Puerto brothers who were involved with the team. The club currently plays in the Honduran second division.
