= Juan Flores (footballer, born 1964) =

Honduran footballer

Personal information
- Full name: Juan Alberto Flores Maradiaga
- Date of birth: 8 March 1964 (age 62)
- Place of birth: El Porvenir, Honduras
- Position: Forward

Senior career*
Years	Team	Apps	(Gls)
1985–1989	Olimpia		(56)
1989–1993	Santos Laguna	114	(45)

International career
1988–1994	Honduras	13	(8)

Managerial career
- 2002: Honduras U17
- 2017: Gimnástico
- * Club domestic league appearances and goals

Juan Alberto Flores Maradiaga (born 8 March 1964) is a Honduran former football player.

== Career statistics ==
=== Club ===
Club	Season	League			Cup		Continental		Other		Total	
Club	Season	Division	Apps	Goals	Apps	Goals	Apps	Goals	Apps	Goals	Apps	Goals
Santos Laguna	1989–90	Mexican Primera División	29	15	1 (Note: Appearances in the Copa MX)	0	–		0	0	30	15
Santos Laguna	1990–91	Mexican Primera División	37	15	6	3	–		0	0	43	18
Santos Laguna	1991–92	Mexican Primera División	28	9	–		–		0	0	28	9
Santos Laguna	1992–93	Mexican Primera División	20	6	–		–		0	0	20	6
Career total			114	45	7	3	0	0	0	0	121	48

=== International ===
National team	Year	Apps	Goals
Honduras	1988	2	1
Honduras	1992	5	5
Honduras	1993	5	2
Honduras	1994	1	0
Total		13	8

=== International goals ===
Scores and results list Honduras' goal tally first.

No	Date	Venue	Opponent	Score	Result	Competition
1.	13 November 1988	Estadio Tiburcio Carías Andino, Tegucigalpa, Honduras	Trinidad and Tobago	1–0	1–1	1989 CONCACAF Championship qualification
2.	22 November 1992	Arnos Vale Stadium, Kingstown, Saint Vincent and the Grenadines	Saint Vincent and the Grenadines	1–0	4–0	1994 FIFA World Cup qualification
3.	22 November 1992	Arnos Vale Stadium, Kingstown, Saint Vincent and the Grenadines	Saint Vincent and the Grenadines	2–0	4–0	1994 FIFA World Cup qualification
4.	28 November 1992	Estadio Tiburcio Carías Andino, Tegucigalpa, Honduras	Saint Vincent and the Grenadines	3–0	4–0	1994 FIFA World Cup qualification
5.	5 December 1992	Estadio Tiburcio Carías Andino, Tegucigalpa, Honduras	Costa Rica	1–0	2–1	1994 FIFA World Cup qualification
6.	25 March 1993	Estadio Tiburcio Carías Andino, Tegucigalpa, Honduras	United States	4–1	4–1	Friendly
7.	2 May 1993	Estadio Tiburcio Carías Andino, Tegucigalpa, Honduras	Mexico	1–3	1–4	1994 FIFA World Cup qualification
