= 1995 Honduran Cup =

Copa de Honduras 1995

Tournament details
- Country: Honduras
- Teams: 10

Final positions
- Champions: Olimpia
- Runners-up: Motagua

Tournament statistics
- Matches played: 45
- Goals scored: 107 (2.38 per match)

In the 1995 Honduran Cup the champion was decided after the first nine rounds of the 1995–96 Honduran Liga Nacional, unlike the previous editions where a separate tournament was played. Club Deportivo Olimpia obtained its first title.

== Standings ==
Pos	Team	Pld	W	D	L	GF	GA	GD	Pts
1	Olimpia (C)	9	4	4	1	17	10	+7	16
2	Motagua	9	4	3	2	15	9	+6	15
3	Victoria	9	3	5	1	10	8	+2	14
4	Platense	9	4	1	4	9	9	0	13
5	Real Maya	9	2	6	1	9	8	+1	12
6	Marathón	9	3	3	3	14	14	0	12
7	Vida	9	2	5	2	7	7	0	11
8	Real España	9	3	2	4	10	12	−2	11
9	Independiente Villela	9	1	4	4	8	14	−6	7
10	Broncos	9	1	3	5	8	16	−8	6

(C) 1995 Honduran Cup Champion
