= Carlos Caballero (Honduran footballer) =

Honduran footballer (born 1958)

Personal information
- Full name: Carlos Orlando Caballero Sánchez
- Date of birth: 5 December 1958 (age 67)
- Place of birth: Olanchito, Honduras
- Position: Midfielder

Senior career*
Years	Team	Apps	(Gls)
1978–1980	Vida	39	(2)
1980–1991	Real España	203	(30)
1991–1992	Marathón	21	(2)
1992–1993	Real Maya	12	(0)
Total		275	(34)

International career
1981–1985	Honduras	15	(2)

Managerial career
- Real España
- 2009: Social Sol
- 2011: Hispano
- 2013: Villanueva
- 2013: Real España (assistant)
- 2015–2016: Social Sol
- * Club domestic league appearances and goals

Carlos Orlando Caballero Sánchez (born 5 December 1958) is a Honduran football midfielder who played for Honduras in the 1982 FIFA World Cup.

== Club career ==
He played for Vida, Real España, Marathón and Real Maya between 1978 and 1993, scoring 34 goals in 275 games.

== International career ==
He played for Honduras in the 1980s and represented his country in 9 FIFA World Cup qualification matches and played in one game at the 1982 FIFA World Cup.

== Retirement and managerial career ==
In the 2009 Clausura season he almost steered Second Division side Social Sol to promotion. He also coached Hispano in 2011.

In June 2010, Caballero was honoured by the Universidad Pedagógica Nacional Francisco Morazán when a new sports facility at the university was named after him. In summer 2013 he left his post at second division Villanueva to become assistant to Hernán Medford at Real España.
