= 1977–78 Honduran Liga Nacional =

Liga Nacional
- Season: 1977–78
- Champions: Olimpia (5th)
- Relegated: Federal
- CONCACAF Champions' Cup: None
- Matches: 158
- Goals: 294 (1.86 per match)
- Top goalscorer: Carreño (10)
- All statistics correct as of 18 December 1977.

The 1977–78 Honduran Liga Nacional season was the 12th edition of the Honduran Liga Nacional. The format of the tournament consisted of a three round-robin schedule followed by a 5-team playoff round. Club Deportivo Olimpia won the title after defeating Real C.D. España in the finals. It's unclear why no Honduran representation was sent to the 1978 CONCACAF Champions' Cup.

== 1977–78 teams ==
- Broncos (Choluteca)
- Federal (Tegucigalpa)
- Marathón (San Pedro Sula)
- Motagua (Tegucigalpa)
- Olimpia (Tegucigalpa)
- Platense (Puerto Cortés)
- Real España (San Pedro Sula)
- Universidad (Tegucigalpa)
- Victoria (La Ceiba, promoted)
- Vida (La Ceiba)

== Regular season ==
=== Standings ===
Pos	Team	Pld	W	D	L	GF	GA	GD	Pts	Qualification or relegation
1	Olimpia (Note: Olimpia won regular season and clinched a spot in final match.)	27	11	12	4	30	20	+10	34	Qualified to the Final round (Note: Top 5 qualify for final round.)
2	Vida	27	10	12	5	27	20	+7	32	Qualified to the Final round
3	Real España	27	9	13	5	27	18	+9	31	Qualified to the Final round
4	Motagua	27	11	8	8	27	21	+6	30	Qualified to the Final round
5	Universidad	27	10	8	9	25	23	+2	28	Qualified to the repechage (Note: Universidad and Broncos fought for 5th place.)
6	Broncos	27	8	12	7	26	24	+2	28	Qualified to the repechage
7	Marathón	27	7	10	10	22	29	−7	24	
8	Victoria	27	5	12	10	17	25	−8	22	
9	Platense	27	6	9	12	27	36	−9	21	
10	Federal	27	4	12	11	20	32	−12	20	Relegated to the Segunda División (Note: Federal relegated to second division.)

=== Reply for Final round ===
2 October 1977 Playoff	Broncos	0–0 (a.e.t.) (3–5 p)	Universidad	San Pedro Sula, Cortés
				Stadium: Estadio Francisco Morazán

== Final round ==
=== Pentagonal standings ===
Pos	Team	Pld	W	D	L	GF	GA	GD	Pts	Qualification or relegation
1	Real España	8	4	4	0	14	5	+9	12	Qualified to the Final (Note: Real España won pentagonal and clinched final spot against Olimpia.)
2	Motagua	8	3	4	1	11	9	+2	10	
3	Olimpia	8	2	4	2	10	7	+3	8	
4	Vida	8	1	3	4	4	10	−6	5	
5	Universidad	8	2	1	5	5	13	−8	5	

=== Final ===
11 December 1977
(UTC−06:00)
1st leg

Real España	0–0	Olimpia

Estadio Francisco Morazán
San Pedro Sula, Cortés
Referee: José Andino

Real España	Olimpia

GK	–	–
–	–	–
–	–	–
–	–	–
–	–	–
–	–	–
–	–	–
–	–	–
–	–	–
–	–	–
–	–	–
Substitutions:
–	–	–
–	–	–
Manager:
(Honduras) Carlos Padilla

GK	–	–
–	–	–
–	–	–
–	–	–
–	–	–
–	–	–
–	–	–
–	–	–
–	–	–
–	–	–
–	–	–
Substitutions:
–	–	–
–	–	–
Manager:
(Honduras) Carlos Cruz

18 December 1977
(UTC−06:00)
2nd leg

Olimpia	2–0	Real España
Chávez 25'; Enamorado 88'

Estadio Tiburcio Carías Andino
Tegucigalpa, Francisco Morazán
Attendance: 23,923
Referee: German Palma

Olimpia	Real España

GK	–	(Honduras) Belarmino Rivera
DF	–	(Honduras) Santos Ruiz
DF	–	(Honduras) Vicente Suazo
DF	–	(Honduras) Óscar García
DF	–	(Honduras) Héctor Uclés
MF	–	(Honduras) Roger Chavarría
MF	–	(Honduras) Ramón Brand
MF	–	(Argentina) Luis Minochio
FW	–	(Honduras) Prudencio Norales
FW	–	(Uruguay) Walter Chávez
FW	–	(Honduras) Rigoberto Gómez
Substitutions:
–	–	(Honduras) Ángel Paz	Substituted on
–	–	(Honduras) René Enamorado	Substituted on
Manager:
(Honduras) Carlos Cruz

GK	–	–
–	–	–
–	–	–
–	–	–
–	–	–
–	–	–
–	–	–
–	–	–
–	–	–
–	–	–
–	–	–
Substitutions:
–	–	–
–	–	–
Manager:
(Honduras) Carlos Padilla

- Olimpia won 2–0 on aggregate score.

Liga Nacional
1977–78 Champion
C.D. Olimpia
5th title

== Top goalscorers ==
- 10 goals:

(Chile) Mario Juvini Carreño (Motagua)

- 8 goals:

(Honduras) Prudencio Norales (Olimpia)

- 7 goals:

(Brazil) Jurandir Dosantos (Marathón)

- 6 goals:

(Brazil) Armando Valenchina (Vida)
(Honduras) Daniel Sambulá (Universidad)
(Honduras) Mario Mairena (Federal)
(Honduras) Salvador Bernárdez (Motagua)
(Honduras) Luis Walter Chávez (Olimpia)

== Squads ==
Broncos
(Honduras) German "Loco" Guzmán	(Costa Rica) Carlos Luis "Macho" Arrieta	(Honduras) Jorge Alberto "Perro" Gonzáles
(Honduras) Ramón Serrano "Guaya" Cruz
Real España
(Honduras) Jimmy Steward	(Honduras) Julio César "El Tile" Arzú	(Honduras) Antonio "Gato" Pavón Molina
(Honduras) Walter Humberto Jimminson	(Chile) Julio del Carmen Tapia Callao	(Honduras) José Estanislao "Tanayo" Ortega
(Chile) Rubén Rodríguez Peña Llantén	(Honduras) Gustavo Portillo	(Honduras) Marvin Zúniga
(Brazil) Alberto Ferreira da Silva	(Honduras) José Luis Cruz Figueroa	(Honduras) Jaime Villegas
(Honduras) Reynaldo Mejía Ortega	(Honduras) Mauricio "Mozambique" Alvarez	(Honduras) Edelmín "Pando" Castro
(Honduras) Gil Rodríguez
Federal
(Honduras) José Alvarez	(Honduras) Víctor Hugo Álvarez	(Honduras) Roberto “Babington” Barahona
(Honduras) José Rafael Irías	(Honduras) Marcos Lacayo	(Honduras) José Lanza
(Honduras) Julio Meza	(Honduras) Mario Roberto Mairena	(Argentina) Enrique “Fantasma” Mendoza
(Honduras) Ronald Quilter	(Guatemala) Jerry Slosher	(Argentina) León Ugarte
(Honduras) Orlando “Bimbo” Vásquez	(Honduras) Francisco “Pantera” Velásquez	(Honduras) Tomás Wood
(Honduras) Francisco Zelaya Pastrana
Marathón
(Honduras) Óscar Rolando "Martillo" Hernández	(Honduras) Luis Alonso Guzmán Velásquez	(Brazil) Jurandir Dosantos
(Honduras) Exequiel "Estupiñán" García	(Costa Rica) Roscoe Charles	(Argentina) Daniel Argelio Romero
(Honduras) Carlos "Calín" Morales	(Honduras) Roberto Bailey	(Honduras) Hernán Santiago "Cortés" García Martínez
(Honduras) Porfirio Armando Betancourt	(Honduras) Ramón "Albañil" Osorio	(Honduras) Arturo Torres "Pacharaca" Bonilla
(Honduras) Ricardo Nuila	(Honduras) Richard Kenneth Payne
Motagua
(Honduras) Ramón Enrique "Primitivo" Maradiaga	(Nicaragua) Roger Mayorga	(Chile) Mario Hernán Juvini Carreño
(Honduras) Salvador "Pichini" Bernárdez	(Honduras) Rigoberto Sosa	(Honduras) Héctor "Lin" Zelaya
(Honduras) Héctor Ramón "Pecho de Aguila" Zelaya	(Honduras) Luis Alberto "Chito" Reyes	(Brazil) Ennos Pereira
(Honduras) Francisco "Pantera" Velásquez
Olimpia
(Honduras) Belarmino Rivera	(Honduras) Orlando Banegas	(Uruguay) Luis Walter Chávez
(Honduras) Ángel Ramón "Mon" Paz	(Honduras) Rigoberto "Shula" Gómez	(Honduras) Óscar García
(Honduras) Héctor Orlando Uclés	(Brazil) César Bordinhao	(Honduras) José Ortiz
(Honduras) Moisés Velásquez	(Honduras) Julio Roberto "Chino" Ortiz	(Honduras) René Enamorado
(Honduras) Prudencio "Tecate" Norales	(Honduras) Ramón Antonio "Pilín" Brand	(Honduras) Net Jonhy Chavarría
(Honduras) Ernesto Paes de Oliveira	(Honduras) Carlos "Care" Alvarado	(Honduras) Arturo Recarte Cáceres
(Honduras) Luis Alonso Minochio	(Honduras) Jorge Alberto "Indio" Urquía Elvir	(Honduras) Selvin Cárcamo
(Honduras) Santos "Indio" Ruíz	(Honduras) Vicente Suazo	(Honduras) Roger Chavarría
Platense
(Honduras) Luis Enrique "Banana" Alvarez	(Honduras) Dagoberto Tejeda	(Honduras) Antonio "El Camalote" Dueñas
(Honduras) Mario Ortega	(Honduras) Rafael Argeñal	(Honduras) Arnulfo Echeverría
(Honduras) Manuel de Jesús Fuentes	(Honduras) Arturo Payne	(Honduras) Tomás Cedricks Ewens "Quito" Wagner
(Honduras) Carlos "Care" Alvarado	(Honduras) Eduardo Laing	(Honduras) Erasmo “Chícharo” Guerrero
(Honduras) Domingo Drummond	(Honduras) Rigoberto Castro	(Honduras) German “Cacique” Castro
(Honduras) Julio “Ruso” Bonilla	(Honduras) Julio Álvarez
Universidad
(Honduras) Roberto "Pirata" Fernández	(Honduras) José Salomón "Turco" Nazzar	(Honduras) Daniel "Diablo" Sambulá
Victoria
(Honduras) Dagoberto Tejeda	(Honduras) Luis Alonso "Chorompo" Zúniga	(Honduras) Carlos "Cuco" Flores
(Honduras) Francisco Jiménez	(Honduras) Jorge Irías	(Honduras) German Güity
(Honduras) Miguel Lanza	(Honduras) David Goff	(Honduras) José Cruz
(Honduras) Julio César Girón	(Honduras) Roberto Urbina	(Honduras) Benedicto Ordóñez
(Honduras) Efraín Martínez "Diablillo" Amaya	(Honduras) José Cálix	(Brazil) Camilo Bonifacio
(Brazil) Pedro Caetano da Silva	(Honduras) Roberto Reynaldo "Robot" Bailey Sargent	(Honduras) Miguel "Primitivo" Ortiz
(Honduras) Armando Acosta	(Honduras) Claudio Castro	(Honduras) Rigoberto "Indio" Ruiz
(Uruguay) Santos "Coco" González	(Honduras) Jorge Cálix	(Honduras) Gustavo Amaya
(Honduras) Jerry Jhonson	(Honduras) Fausto Humberto "Chiva" Ruiz
Vida
(Honduras) Mario Ardón	(Honduras) Roberto "Macho" Figueroa	(Honduras) Ramón Nectally "Liebre" Guardado
(Honduras) Matilde Selím Lacayo	(Brazil) Armando Valenchina

== Known results ==
=== Round 1 ===
20 February 1977

Marathón	0–1	Victoria
		Zúñiga

San Pedro Sula

=== Round 2 ===
27 February 1977	Victoria	v	Real España	La Ceiba
CST				Stadium: Estadio Nilmo Edwards

27 February 1977	Motagua	v	Platense
CST	Obando

=== Round 3 ===
6 March 1977

Victoria	2–1	Platense
		Flores

La Ceiba

=== Round 4 ===
13 March 1977

Federal	1–1	Victoria

Tegucigalpa

=== Round 5 ===
20 March 1977

Vida	2–1	Victoria

La Ceiba

=== Round 17 ===
10 July 1977

Olimpia	2–5	Platense
Rivera (pen.); Ortiz		Argeñal; Payne; Laing

Tegucigalpa

=== Round 18 ===
Olimpia	1–1	Victoria

La Ceiba

=== Round 27 ===
2 October 1977

Vida	1–1	Platense

La Ceiba

=== Pentagonal ===
9 October 1977

Real España	2–1	Vida

San Pedro Sula
9 October 1977

Olimpia	2–3	Motagua
Gómez; Chavarría		Reyes; Pereira; Bernárdez

Tegucigalpa
16 October 1977

Real España	0–0	Olimpia

San Pedro Sula
19 October 1977

Motagua	1–0	Vida

Tegucigalpa
23 October 1977

Motagua	1–1	Real España

Tegucigalpa
30 October 1977

Real España	5–0	Universidad
Bailey; Jiminson; Tapia; Rodríguez

San Pedro Sula
6 November 1977
15:00

Vida	0–2	Real España
		Tapia; Castro

La Ceiba
9 November 1977

Olimpia	1–1	Real España
García		Ferreira

Tegucigalpa
13 November 1977

Motagua	0–0	Olimpia

Tegucigalpa
4 December 1977

Real España	2–2	Motagua

San Pedro Sula

Olimpia	2–0	Universidad

Olimpia	1–2	Universidad

Olimpia	3–0	Vida
Chávez; Gómez; Norales

Olimpia	1–1	Vida

Universidad	0–1	Real España

=== Unknown rounds ===
20 March 1977	Olimpia	1–0	Motagua	Tegucigalpa
	García			Stadium: Estadio Tiburcio Carías Andino

27 March 1977	Vida	4–2	Federal	La Ceiba
				Stadium: Estadio Nilmo Edwards

17 April 1977	España	0–1	Olimpia	San Pedro Sula
				Stadium: Estadio Francisco Morazán

1 May 1977	Broncos	2–1	Motagua	Choluteca
				Stadium: Estadio Fausto Flores Lagos

15 May 1977	Vida	3–0	Marathón	La Ceiba
				Stadium: Estadio Nilmo Edwards

5 June 1977	Federal	1–1	Vida	Tegucigalpa
			Ardón	Stadium: Estadio Tiburcio Carías Andino

12 June 1977	Motagua	v	Federal
CST	Obando

19 June 1977	Olimpia	0–0	Real España	Tegucigalpa
				Stadium: Estadio Tiburcio Carías Andino

26 June 1977	Vida	1–1	Broncos	La Ceiba
	Ardón		Barbosa	Stadium: Estadio Nilmo Edwards

7 August 1977	Olimpia	4–0	Universidad
	Gómez; Bran; Chavarría; Chávez

21 August 1977	Broncos	0–0	Universidad	Choluteca
				Stadium: Estadio Fausto Flores Lagos

21 August 1977	Vida	0–0	Marathón	La Ceiba
				Stadium: Estadio Nilmo Edwards

21 August 1977	Platense	0–1	Victoria	San Pedro Sula
				Stadium: Estadio Francisco Morazán

21 August 1977	Real España	0–0	Olimpia	San Pedro Sula
				Stadium: Estadio Francisco Morazán

28 August 1977	Olimpia	2–1	Motagua	Tegucigalpa
	Uclés; Norales		Bernárdez	Stadium: Estadio Tiburcio Carías Andino

18 September 1977	Platense	3–0	Federal	San Pedro Sula
	Payne; Alvarez; Echeverría			Stadium: Estadio Francisco Morazán

Victoria	0–1	Universidad	La Ceiba
			Stadium: Estadio Nilmo Edwards

Motagua	3–0	Platense	Tegucigalpa
			Stadium: Estadio Tiburcio Carías Andino

Olimpia	1–2	Motagua	Tegucigalpa
			Stadium: Estadio Tiburcio Carías Andino

Olimpia	1–1	Universidad

Olimpia	1–0	Universidad

Olimpia	1–1	Vida

Olimpia	1–0	Vida

Olimpia	2–0	Vida

Olimpia	1–1	Federal

Olimpia	0–0	Federal

Olimpia	1–1	Federal

Olimpia	1–2	Broncos

Olimpia	2–1	Broncos

Olimpia	2–0	Broncos

Olimpia	2–1	Marathón

Olimpia	0–0	Marathón

Olimpia	0–1	Marathón

Olimpia	2–1	Victoria

Olimpia	0–0	Victoria

Marathón	3–2	Federal

Vida	4–2	Federal
