= Honduras national football team results (1980–1989) =

Honduras
1980–89 season

This is a list of the Honduras national football team results from 1980 to 1989.

== 1980 ==
In 1980, Honduras played against El Salvador for the first time since the Football War in 1969.

6 March 1980 Friendly	Honduras	1–1	Costa Rica	Tegucigalpa, Honduras
CST	Norales 26'			Stadium: Estadio Tiburcio Carías Andino; Referee: Record: 3–5–11 (18:53)

18 March 1980 Friendly	Honduras	0–1	Mexico	Tegucigalpa, Honduras
CST			2' González	Stadium: Estadio Tiburcio Carías Andino; Referee: Cecilio Torres (HON); Record: 1–1–7 (9:20)

8 April 1980 Friendly	Mexico	5–1	Honduras	Toluca, Mexico
CST	Sánchez 4' 89'; Manzo 25' 88'; González 42'		77' Figueroa	Stadium: Estadio Nemesio Díez; Attendance: 8,000; Referee: Edgardo Codesal (MEX); Record: 1–1–8 (10:25)

16 April 1980 Friendly	Costa Rica	1–1	Honduras	San José, Costa Rica
CST			80' Bailey	Stadium: Estadio Nacional; Referee: Record: 3–6–11 (19:54)

6 June 1980 Friendly	Honduras	3–1	Haiti	Tegucigalpa, Honduras
CST				Stadium: Estadio Tiburcio Carías Andino; Referee: Record: 3–0–3 (9:7)

10 June 1980 Friendly	Honduras	1–0	Haiti	San Pedro Sula, Honduras
CST				Stadium: Estadio Francisco Morazán; Referee: Record: 4–0–3 (10:7)

13 June 1980 Friendly	Honduras	0–0	Panama	Tegucigalpa, Honduras
CST				Stadium: Estadio Tiburcio Carías Andino; Referee: Record: 5–1–1 (8:3)

15 June 1980 Friendly	Honduras	2–0	Panama	Tegucigalpa, Honduras
CST				Stadium: Estadio Tiburcio Carías Andino; Referee: Record: 6–1–1 (10:3)

16 July 1980 Friendly	Guatemala	1–1	Honduras	Guatemala City, Guatemala
CST				Stadium: Estadio Mateo Flores; Referee: Record: 6–8–5 (21:28)

30 July 1980 CCQ	Panama	0–2	Honduras	Panama City, Panama
EST			14' Bernárdez; 85' Costly	Stadium: Estadio Revolución; Attendance: 8,975; Referee: Herman Tromp (ANT); Record: 7–1–1 (12:3)

1 October 1980 CCQ	Costa Rica	2–3	Honduras	San José, Costa Rica
CST	Jiménez 78' (pen.); Mills 81'		29' Bulnes; 42' Bernárdez; 67' Bailey	Stadium: Estadio Ricardo Saprissa Aymá; Attendance: 18,263; Referee: Dino Soupliotis (CAN); Record: 4–6–11 (22:56)

26 October 1980 CCQ	Honduras	0–0	Guatemala	Tegucigalpa, Honduras
CST				Stadium: Estadio Tiburcio Carías Andino; Attendance: 44,220; Referee: Marco Dorantes (MEX); Record: 6–9–5 (21:28)

9 November 1980 Friendly	Honduras	2–0	Canada	Tegucigalpa, Honduras
CST				Stadium: Estadio Tiburcio Carías Andino; Referee: Rolando Paz (HON); Record: 1–0–0 (2:0)

16 November 1980 CCQ	Honduras	1–1	Costa Rica	Tegucigalpa, Honduras
CST	Velásquez 73'		33' Morera	Stadium: Estadio Tiburcio Carías Andino; Attendance: 28,159; Referee: David Socha (USA); Record: 4–7–11 (23:57)

23 November 1980 CCQ	El Salvador	2–1	Honduras	San Salvador, El Salvador
CST	González 9'; Guerrero 66'		85' Figueroa	Stadium: Estadio Cuscatlán; Attendance: 40,851; Referee: Rolando Fusco (CAN); Record: 6–2–10 (26:34)

30 November 1980 CCQ	Honduras	2–0	El Salvador	Tegucigalpa, Honduras
CST	Bailey 23' 66'			Stadium: Estadio Tiburcio Carías Andino; Attendance: 38,979; Referee: Antonio Evangelista (CAN); Record: 7–2–10 (28:34)

7 December 1980 CCQ	Guatemala	0–1	Honduras	Guatemala City, Guatemala
CST			71' Bailey	Stadium: Estadio Mateo Flores; Attendance: 42,381; Referee: Toros Kibritjian (USA); Record: 7–9–5 (22:28)

14 December 1980 CCQ	Honduras	5–0	Panama	Tegucigalpa, Honduras
CST	Bernárdez 6' 21' 69'; Figueroa 32' 77'			Stadium: Estadio Tiburcio Carías Andino; Attendance: 24,189; Referee: Enrique Mendoza (MEX); Record: 8–1–1 (17:3)

== 1981 ==
3 November 1981 CC	Honduras	4–0	Haiti	Tegucigalpa, Honduras
CST	Bueso 35'; Urquía 40'; Laing 64'; Figueroa 75'			Stadium: Estadio Tiburcio Carías Andino; Attendance: 15,387; Referee: José Aragão (BRA); Record: 5–0–3 (14:7)

8 November 1981 CC	Honduras	2–0	Cuba	Tegucigalpa, Honduras
CST	Bueso 36'; Costly 69'			Stadium: Estadio Tiburcio Carías Andino; Attendance: 33,876; Referee: Luis Siles (CRC); Record: 3–0–5 (9:20)

12 November 1981 CC	Honduras	2–1	Canada	Tegucigalpa, Honduras
CST	Caballero 12'; Figueroa 40'		19' Bridge	Stadium: Estadio Tiburcio Carías Andino; Referee: Rómulo Méndez (GUA); Record: 2–0–0 (4:1)

16 November 1981 CC	Honduras	0–0	El Salvador	Tegucigalpa, Honduras
CST				Stadium: Estadio Tiburcio Carías Andino; Referee: Luis Siles (CRC); Record: 7–3–10 (28:34)

22 November 1981 CC	Honduras	0–0	Mexico	Tegucigalpa, Honduras
CST				Stadium: Estadio Tiburcio Carías Andino; Referee: David Socha (USA); Record: 1–2–8 (10:25)

== 1982 ==
The year 1982 marks the first time Honduras participated in a FIFA World Cup. It also was the year they faced an Asian team for the first time when they defeated the United Arab Emirates with a 0–1 score.

5 February 1982 Friendly	Honduras	0–0	Romania	Tegucigalpa, Honduras
CST				Stadium: Estadio Tiburcio Carías Andino; Attendance: 25,000; Referee: Palma Gómez; Record: 0–1–0 (0:0)

12 February 1982 Friendly	Honduras	1–1	Romania	Mérida, Venezuela
VET	Bulnes 62'		36' Iordănescu	Stadium: Estadio Guillermo Soto Rosa; Attendance: 15,000; Referee: Record: 0–2–0 (1:1)

1 March 1982 Friendly	United Arab Emirates	0–1	Honduras	Abu Dhabi, United Arab Emirates
GST				Referee: Ali Khalfan; Record: 1–0–0 (1:0)

3 March 1982 Friendly	United Arab Emirates	0–0	Honduras	Abu Dhabi, United Arab Emirates
GST				Referee: Farid Zainal (UAE); Record: 1–1–0 (1:0)

23 March 1982 Friendly	América (Mexico)	3–1	Honduras	Los Angeles, United States
PST	Ortega 35'; Pinheira; Outes (?)		86' Figueroa	Stadium: Los Angeles Memorial Coliseum; Referee: Record: 0–0–1 (1:3)

25 March 1982 Friendly	New York Cosmos (United States)	3–1	Honduras	Los Angeles, United States
PST	Romero 20'; Chinaglia 45'; Neeskens 89'		78' Bueso	Stadium: Los Angeles Memorial Coliseum; Referee: Record: 0–0–1 (1:3)

18 April 1982 Friendly	El Salvador	3–2	Honduras	San Salvador, El Salvador
CST	Huezo 11'; González 19' 89'		23' Norales; 33' Betancourt	Referee: Morazán; Record: 7–3–11 (30:37)

22 April 1982 Friendly	Honduras	1–1	El Salvador	San Pedro Sula, Honduras
CST	Betancourt 30'		13' Rivas	Stadium: Estadio Francisco Morazán; Referee: Palma Gómez; Record: 7–4–11 (31:38)

20 May 1982 Friendly	Honduras	1–1	(Spain) Real Madrid	Tegucigalpa, Honduras
CST	Norales 37'		77' García	Stadium: Estadio Tiburcio Carías Andino; Referee: R. Martínez (HON); Record: 0–1–0 (1:1)

16 June 1982 FWC	Spain	1–1	Honduras	Valencia, Spain
21:00 CET	López 65' (pen.)		8' Zelaya	Stadium: Estadio Luís Casanova; Attendance: 49,562; Referee: Arturo Ithurralde (ARG); Record: 0–1–0 (1:1)

21 June 1982 FWC	Honduras	1–1	Northern Ireland	Zaragoza, Spain
21:00 CET	Laing 60'		10' Armstrong	Stadium: La Romareda; Attendance: 15,000; Referee: Thomson Chan (HKG); Record: 0–1–0 (1:1)

24 June 1982 FWC	Honduras	0–1	Yugoslavia	Zaragoza, Spain
21:00 CET			88' (pen.) Petrović	Stadium: La Romareda; Attendance: 25,000; Referee: Gastón Castro (CHI); Record: 0–0–1 (0:1)

== 1983 ==
25 March 1983 Friendly	Honduras	2–1	Mexico Amateur	Tegucigalpa, Honduras
CST				Stadium: Estadio Tiburcio Carías Andino; Referee: Record: 1–0–0 (2:1)

3 May 1983 Friendly	Guatemala	0–2	Honduras	Guatemala City, Guatemala
CST			70' Suazo; 71' Espinoza; Starting XI; Tejeda (GK); Drummond (substituted off); V. Suazo (substituted off); Bulnes; Gutiérrez; Ruíz; Cáceres; Espinoza (substituted off); Norales; Lacayo (substituted off); Laing; Substitutes; L. Suazo (substituted on); Reyes (substituted on); Bonilla (substituted on); Toledo (substituted on); Coach (HON) González	Stadium: Estadio Mateo Flores; Referee: Danilo Ardón (GUA); Record: 8–9–5 (24:28)

11 May 1983 CPOTQ	Honduras	0–1	Costa Rica	Tegucigalpa, Honduras
CST			Guardia	Stadium: Estadio Tiburcio Carías Andino; Referee: Record: 4–7–12 (23:58)

18 May 1983 CPOTQ	Costa Rica	3–2	Honduras	San José, Costa Rica
CST	Coronado; Chavarría			Referee: Record: 4–7–13 (25:61)

1 December 1983 Friendly	Honduras	0–0	United States	Tegucigalpa, Honduras
CST				Stadium: Estadio Tiburcio Carías Andino; Referee: Record: 0–2–1 (1:2)

4 December 1983 Friendly	Honduras	1–1	United States	San Pedro Sula, Honduras
CST	Maradiaga		Maher	Stadium: Estadio Francisco Morazán; Referee: Record: 0–3–1 (2:3)

7 December 1983 Friendly	Honduras	0–0	United States	El Progreso, Honduras
CST				Stadium: Estadio Humberto Micheletti; Attendance: 10,000; Referee: Record: 0–4–1 (2:3)

11 December 1983 Friendly	Honduras	3–1	Canada	San Pedro Sula, Honduras
CST	Matthews; Laing		Pakos	Stadium: Estadio Francisco Morazán; Referee: Record: 3–0–0 (7:2)

14 December 1983 Friendly	Honduras	1–0	Canada	Tegucigalpa, Honduras
CST				Stadium: Estadio Tiburcio Carías Andino; Referee: Record: 4–0–0 (8:2)

== 1984 ==
22 February 1984 Friendly	Honduras	0–0	(Uruguay) Nacional	Tegucigalpa, Honduras
CST				Stadium: Estadio Tiburcio Carías Andino; Referee: Record: 0–1–0 (0:1)

26 February 1984 Friendly	Peru	1–3	Honduras	Lima, Peru
PET	Hirano 48'		7' (o.g.) Uculaman; 44' Caballero; 55' Drummond	Attendance: 7,000; Referee: Édison Pérez (PER); Record: 1–0–0 (3:1)

15 May 1984 Friendly	United States	2–3	Honduras	New Orleans, United States
CST				Referee: Edward Bellion (USA); Record: 1–4–1 (5:5)

16 June 1984 CCQ	Panama	0–3	Honduras	Colón, Panama
EST			16' Laing; 54' 62' Figueroa	Stadium: Estadio Armando Dely Valdés; Attendance: 40,000; Referee: Carlos Ortiz (SLV); Record: 9–1–1 (20:3)

24 June 1984 CCQ	Honduras	1–0	Panama	Tegucigalpa, Honduras
CST	Figueroa (pen.)			Stadium: Estadio Tiburcio Carías Andino; Referee: Gus Constantine (USA); Record: 10–1–1 (21:3)

3 October 1984 Friendly	Honduras	1–0	Guatemala	Tegucigalpa, Honduras
CST				Stadium: Estadio Tiburcio Carías Andino; Referee: Rodolfo Martínez (HON); Record: 9–9–5 (25:28)

7 December 1984 Friendly	Honduras	0–0	Ecuador	Tegucigalpa, Honduras
CST				Stadium: Estadio Tiburcio Carías Andino; Referee: Record: 0–1–0 (0:0)

16 December 1984 Friendly	Guatemala	1–0	Honduras	Guatemala City, Guatemala
CST				Referee: Record: 9–9–6 (25:29)

== 1985 ==
January 1985 Friendly	Honduras	2–0	(West Germany) Cologne	Tegucigalpa, Honduras
CST	Toledo; Mendoza			Stadium: Estadio Tiburcio Carías Andino; Referee: Cecilio Torres (HON); Record: 1–0–0 (2:0)

25 January 1985 Friendly	Honduras	0–3	Denmark	San Pedro Sula, Honduras
CST			Christensen; Hansen	Stadium: Estadio Francisco Morazán; Referee: Record: 0–0–1 (0:3)

27 January 1985 Friendly	Honduras	1–0	Denmark	Tegucigalpa, Honduras
CST	Lacayo 22'			Stadium: Estadio Tiburcio Carías Andino; Attendance: 25,000; Referee: Rodolfo Martínez (HON); Record: 1–0–1 (1:3)

3 March 1985 CC	Suriname	1–1	Honduras	Tegucigalpa, Honduras
CST	Entingh		Laing	Stadium: Estadio Tiburcio Carías Andino; Attendance: 35,000; Referee: Mamerto Negreros (GUA); Record: 0–2–0 (2:2)

6 March 1985 CC	Honduras	2–1	Suriname	Tegucigalpa, Honduras
CST	Figueroa 9' 58'		88' Stewart	Stadium: Estadio Tiburcio Carías Andino; Attendance: 27,453; Referee: Carlos Alfaro (CRC); Record: 1–2–0 (4:3)

10 March 1985 CC	El Salvador	1–2	Honduras	San Salvador, El Salvador
CST	Rivas 63'		1' Bailey; 77' Laing	Stadium: Estadio Cuscatlán; Attendance: 51,555; Referee: David Socha (USA); Record: 8–4–11 (33:39)

14 March 1985 CC	Honduras	0–0	El Salvador	Tegucigalpa, Honduras
CST				Stadium: Estadio Tiburcio Carías Andino; Attendance: 38,175; Referee: Tony Evangelista (CAN); Record: 8–5–11 (33:39)

25 May 1985 Friendly	Honduras	1–1	(Brazil) Grêmio	Tegucigalpa, Honduras
CST	Bailey		Valdo	Stadium: Estadio Tiburcio Carías Andino; Referee: Record: 0–1–0 (1:1)

28 May 1985 Friendly	Honduras	1–4	(Brazil) Grêmio	San Pedro Sula, Honduras
CST			Caio Jr.	Stadium: Estadio Francisco Morazán; Referee: Record: 0–1–1 (2:5)

11 August 1985 CC	Costa Rica	2–2	Honduras	San José, Costa Rica
CST	Solano 19'; Williams 81'		8' (pen.) Figueroa; 24' Betancourt	Stadium: Estadio Nacional; Attendance: 20,043; Referee: Edward Bellion (USA); Record: 4–8–13 (27:63)

25 August 1985 CC	Honduras	0–1	Canada	Tegucigalpa, Honduras
CST			58' Pakos	Stadium: Estadio Tiburcio Carías Andino; Attendance: 37,000; Referee: Charles Marshall (BER); Record: 4–0–1 (8:3)

8 September 1985 CC	Honduras	3–1	Costa Rica	Tegucigalpa, Honduras
CST	Betancourt 40'; Figueroa 51' 56'		7' Guimarães	Stadium: Estadio Tiburcio Carías Andino; Attendance: 37,000; Referee: Richard Ramcharan (TRI); Record: 5–8–13 (30:64)

14 September 1985 CC	Canada	2–1	Honduras	St. John's, Canada
NST	Pakos 15'; Vrablic 61'		49' Betancourt	Stadium: King George V Park; Attendance: 7,500; Referee: Rómulo Méndez (GUA); Record: 4–0–2 (9:5)

== 1986 ==
4 January 1986 CAG	El Salvador	0–2	Honduras	Guatemala City, Guatemala
CST				Stadium: Estadio Mateo Flores; Referee: Record: 9–5–11 (35:39)

8 January 1986 CAG	Guatemala	1–0	Honduras	Guatemala City, Guatemala
CST				Stadium: Estadio Mateo Flores; Referee: Record: 9–9–7 (25:30)

10 January 1986 CAG	Honduras	4–0	Nicaragua	Guatemala City, Guatemala
CST				Stadium: Estadio Mateo Flores; Referee: Record: 6–1–1 (28:6)

25 June 1986 CACG	Honduras	2–0	Netherlands Antilles	Santiago de los Caballeros, Dominican Republic
AST				Referee: Record: 3–3–3 (18:19)

28 June 1986 CACG	Barbados	0–1	Honduras	Santiago de los Caballeros, Dominican Republic
AST				Referee: Record: 1–0–0 (1:0)

30 June 1986 CACG	Antigua and Barbuda	0–1	Honduras	Santiago de los Caballeros, Dominican Republic
AST				Referee: Record: 1–0–0 (1:0)

2 July 1986 CACG	Dominican Republic	0–2	Honduras	Santiago de los Caballeros, Dominican Republic
AST				Referee: Record: 1–0–0 (2:0)

4 July 1986 CACG	Cuba	1–1 (4–2 p)	Honduras	Santiago de los Caballeros, Dominican Republic
AST				Referee: Record: 3–1–5 (10:21)

28 October 1986 Friendly	Honduras	1–0	Panama	Managua, Nicaragua
CST				Referee: Record: 11–1–1 (22:3)

== 1987 ==
29 April 1987 Friendly	Honduras	1–0	El Salvador	Honduras
CST				Referee: Record: 10–5–11 (36:39)

17 May 1987 CPOT	Honduras	1–2	Guatemala	Tegucigalpa, Honduras
CST	Smith 7'		43' Monzón; 84' Chacón	Stadium: Estadio Tiburcio Carías Andino; Referee: Berny Ulloa (CRC); Record: 9–9–8 (26:32)

31 May 1987 CPOT	Guatemala	2–2	Honduras	Guatemala City, Guatemala
CST				Stadium: Estadio Mateo Flores; Referee: T. Herrera (SLV); Record: 9–10–8 (28:34)

2 October 1987 Friendly	Honduras	1–1	Canada	Tegucigalpa, Honduras
CST			Catliff	Stadium: Estadio Tiburcio Carías Andino; Attendance: 30,000; Referee: Record: 4–1–2 (10:6)

== 1988 ==
13 January 1988 Friendly	Honduras	0–1	Mexico	San Pedro Sula, Honduras
CST			85' Flores	Stadium: Estadio Francisco Morazán; Attendance: 15,000; Referee: Gonzalo Tejada (HON); Record: 1–2–9 (10:26)

18 March 1988 Friendly	El Salvador	0–0	Honduras	Los Angeles, United States
PST				Attendance: 19,017; Referee: Record: 10–6–11 (36:39)

26 April 1988 Friendly	Mexico	4–1	Honduras	Ciudad Victoria, Mexico
CST	Guzmán; Mora; García; Sosa		90' Dueñas	Stadium: Estadio Marte R. Gómez; Referee: Record: 1–2–10 (11:30)

15 June 1988 Friendly	Honduras	1–1	Ecuador	Tegucigalpa, Honduras
CST	Machado		Capurro	Stadium: Estadio Tiburcio Carías Andino; Attendance: 15,000; Referee: Record: 0–2–0 (1:1)

17 June 1988 Friendly	Honduras	0–1	Ecuador	Tegucigalpa, Honduras
CST				Stadium: Estadio Tiburcio Carías Andino; Referee: Record: 0–2–1 (1:2)

16 July 1988 Friendly	Honduras	1–0	(Brazil) Botafogo	San Pedro Sula, Honduras
CST	Cálix 23'			Stadium: Estadio Francisco Morazán; Referee: Gonzalo Tejada (HON); Record: 1–0–0 (1:0)

12 September 1988 Friendly	Honduras	0–0	Paraguay	San Pedro Sula, Honduras
CST				Stadium: Estadio Francisco Morazán; Referee: Record: 0–1–0 (0:0)

15 September 1988 Friendly	Honduras	0–2	Paraguay	Tegucigalpa, Honduras
CST			Brítez; Escobar	Stadium: Estadio Tiburcio Carías Andino; Referee: Record: 0–1–1 (0:2)

25 September 1988 Friendly	El Salvador	0–0	Honduras	Los Angeles, United States
PST				Referee: Record: 10–7–11 (36:39)

30 October 1988 CCQ	Trinidad and Tobago	0–0	Honduras	Port of Spain, Trinidad and Tobago
AST				Stadium: Queen's Park Oval; Attendance: 27,000; Referee: Arturo Brizio (MEX); Record: 2–2–0 (4:2)

13 November 1988 CCQ	Honduras	1–1	Trinidad and Tobago	Tegucigalpa, Honduras
CST	Flores 20'		56' Charles	Stadium: Estadio Tiburcio Carías Andino; Attendance: 21,000; Referee: Tony Evangelista (CAN); Record: 2–3–0 (5:3)

== Record ==
Record does not include matches against clubs or amateur teams.

Description	Record	Goals
1980s record	34–31–17	96:63
All-time record	72–54–63	249:261
