= 1976–77 Honduran Liga Nacional =

Liga Nacional
- Season: 1976–77
- Champions: España (3rd)
- Relegated: Campamento
- CONCACAF Champions' Cup: España; Motagua
- Matches: 149
- Goals: 269 (1.81 per match)
- Top goalscorer: Hernández (10)

The 1976–77 Honduran Liga Nacional season was the 11th edition of the Honduran Liga Nacional. The format of the tournament remained the same as the previous season. C.D. España won the title after defeating C.D. Motagua in the finals. Both teams qualified to the 1977 CONCACAF Champions' Cup.

== 1976–77 teams ==
- Broncos (Choluteca)
- Campamento (Catacamas, promoted)
- España (San Pedro Sula)
- Federal (Tegucigalpa)
- Marathón (San Pedro Sula)
- Motagua (Tegucigalpa)
- Olimpia (Tegucigalpa)
- Platense (Puerto Cortés)
- Universidad (Tegucigalpa)
- Vida (La Ceiba)

== Regular season ==
=== Standings ===
Pos	Team	Pld	W	D	L	GF	GA	GD	Pts	Qualification or relegation
1	España (Note: España clinched final spot as regular season winner.)	27	15	8	4	32	13	+19	38	Qualified to the Final round (Note: Top four qualified to final round.)
2	Motagua	27	13	9	5	27	12	+15	35	Qualified to the Final round
3	Vida	27	14	5	8	28	19	+9	33	Qualified to the Final round
4	Marathón	27	9	13	5	40	28	+12	31	Qualified to the Final round
5	Olimpia	27	8	14	5	19	10	+9	30	
6	Universidad	27	9	9	9	20	21	−1	27	
7	Platense	27	6	12	9	13	17	−4	24	
8	Federal	27	6	8	13	19	32	−13	20	
9	Broncos	27	4	11	12	19	36	−17	19	
10	Campamento	27	4	5	18	13	42	−29	13	Relegated to Segunda División (Note: Campamento relegated.)

== Final round ==
=== Cuadrangular standings ===
Pos	Team	Pld	W	D	L	GF	GA	GD	Pts	Qualification or relegation
1	Motagua	6	4	1	1	9	6	+3	9	Qualified to the Final (Note: Motagua qualified to final.)
2	España	6	4	0	2	9	6	+3	8	
3	Marathón	6	2	0	4	9	12	−3	4	
4	Vida	6	1	1	4	7	10	−3	3	

=== Final ===
5 December 1976 1st leg	Motagua	0–0	España	Tegucigalpa, Francisco Morazán
CST				Stadium: Estadio Tiburcio Carías Andino; Referee: Porfirio Guerra

12 December 1976 2nd leg	España	4–1	Motagua	San Pedro Sula, Cortés
CST	Soto 11'; Yearwood 66'; Ferreira 81'; Bailey 89'		72' Maradiaga	Stadium: Estadio Francisco Morazán; Attendance: 14,000 (L 55,800.92); Referee: Carlos Ortiz

== Top scorer ==
- (Honduras) Oscar Hernández (Marathón) with 10 goals

== Squads ==
Broncos
(Honduras) Hernán Santiago "Cortés" García Martínez	(Honduras) Salustio Pacheco	(Honduras) Ramón Serrano "Guaya" Cruz
(Honduras) Jorge Alberto "Perro" Gonzáles	(Honduras) Marco Tulio Rubí
Campamento
(Chile) Arturo Díaz	(Honduras) Dagoberto Nayra	(Honduras) Alex Rodríguez
(Honduras) José Humberto Tróchez	(Honduras) David Silva
Real España
(Honduras) Jimmy Steward	(Honduras) Julio César "El Tile" Arzú	(Costa Rica) Carlos Luis "Macho" Arrieta
(Honduras) Mauricio "Mozambique" Alvarez	(Honduras) José Luis Cruz Figueroa	(Honduras) Jaime Villegas
(Honduras) Ernesto "Tractor" Ramírez	(Honduras) Salvador "Vayoy" Martínez	(Honduras) Julio César Girón
(Honduras) Allan Costly	(Honduras) Gilberto Yearwood	(Honduras) Antonio "Gato" Pavón Molina
(Honduras) Edelmín "Pando" Castro	(Honduras) José Estanislao "Tanayo" Ortega	(Honduras) Edy Bustillo
(Brazil) Alberto Ferreira da Silva	(Honduras) Jimmy James Bailey	(Chile) Julio Tapia
(Chile) Andrés Soto Araya	(Honduras) Roberto Martínez "Roby" Arzú	(Honduras) Gil Josué Rodríguez
(Chile) Rubén Rodríguez-Peña	(Honduras) Reynaldo Mejía Ortega	(Honduras) Walter Humberto Jimminson
(Honduras) Julio “Chino” Ortiz	(Honduras) Clinton Campbell	(Honduras) Gustavo Portillo
(Argentina) Luis Oswaldo Altamirano	(Honduras) Marvin Zúniga	(Ecuador) Jorge García Rojas
(Honduras) Junior Costly
Federal
(Honduras) Julio Meza	(Honduras) José Ernesto "Toto" Cáceres
Marathón
(Honduras) Óscar Rolando "Martillo" Hernández	(Honduras) Luis Alonso Guzmán Velásquez	(Argentina) Daniel Argelio Romero
(Costa Rica) Leroy Foster	(Honduras) Carlos "Calín" Morales	(Costa Rica) Roscoe Charles
(Honduras) Exequiel "Estupiñán" García	(Honduras) Ramón "Albañil" Osorio	(Honduras) Arturo Torres "Pacharaca" Bonilla
(Honduras) Allan Ricardo Young	(Honduras) Roberto Reynaldo "Robot" Bailey Sargent
Motagua
(Honduras) Rubén "Chamaco" Guifarro	(Honduras) Alfredo Hawit Banegas	(Brazil) Jurandir dos Santos
(Honduras) José Maria "Chema" Durón	(Honduras) Mariano Godoy	(Chile) Mario Iubini
(Honduras) Ramón Enrique "Primitivo" Maradiaga	(Nicaragua) Roger Mayorga	(Honduras) Alcides Morales
(Honduras) Ronald Quilter	(Honduras) Luis Alberto "Chito" Reyes	(Honduras) Roxne Romero
(Honduras) Rigoberto Sosa	(Honduras) Francisco "Pantera" Velásquez	(Honduras) Manuel "Candado" Williams
(Honduras) Héctor Ramón "Pecho de Aguila" Zelaya	(Honduras) Héctor "Lin" Zelaya
Olimpia
(Honduras) Carlos "Care" Alvarado	(Honduras) Jorge Alberto "Cejas" Brand Guevara	(Honduras) Ramón Antonio "Pilín" Brand
(Honduras) Selvin Cárcamo	(Uruguay) Walter Chávez	(Honduras) Marco Antonio "Tonín" Mendoza
(Honduras) Ángel Ramón "Mon" Paz
Platense
(Honduras) Carlos "Care" Alvarado	(Honduras) Rafael Argeñal	(Honduras) Félix Concepción Carranza
(Honduras) Tomás Cedricks Ewens "Quito" Wagner	(Honduras) Manuel de Jesús Fuentes	(Honduras) Erasmo "Chícharo" Guerrero
(Honduras) Mario Ortega	(Honduras) Arturo Payne	(Honduras) Víctor Samuel Rivera
Universidad
(Honduras) José Salomón "Turco" Nazzar	(Honduras) Ricardo Nuila	(Honduras) Pablo Candú Palma
(Honduras) Daniel "Diablo" Sambulá
Vida
(Honduras) Marco Antonio Marcos Peña	(Honduras) José María "Chema" Salinas	(Honduras) Gustavo Adolfo "Gorcha" Collins
(Honduras) Zacarías "Frijolito" Collins	(Honduras) Oscar "Burra" Acosta	(Honduras) Arturo "Junia" Garden
(Honduras) Morris Garden	(Honduras) Mario McKoy	(Honduras) Manuel Bernárdez Calderón
(Honduras) César "Cesarín" Aguirre	(Honduras) Wilfredo "Wil" Rodríguez	(Honduras) Mario Murillo
(Guatemala) Jesús Octavio Cifuentes	(Honduras) Jairo López	(Honduras) José López "Rulo" Paz
(Honduras) Mario Ardón	(Honduras) Tomás "Tommy" Marshall	(Honduras) Juan David
(Honduras) Edgardo Williams	(Honduras) Vicente Suazo	(Honduras) Dennis "Bomba" Hinds
(Honduras) Peter Buchanan	(Honduras) Enrique "Palanca" Mendoza	(Honduras) Jorge Peralta
(Honduras) Antonio "Danto" Urbina	(Honduras) Hermenegildo Orellana	(Honduras) Ramón Neptaly "Liebre" Guardado
(Honduras) Jorge Caballero	(Honduras) Osman Zelaya	(Honduras) Fredy Delgado
(Honduras) Matilde Selím Lacayo	(Honduras) Marco Antonio Caballero

== Known results ==
=== Round 1 ===
22 February 1976

Marathón	4–2	Campamento
Foster

San Pedro Sula
22 February 1976

Motagua	–	Universidad
		Williams (?)

Tegucigalpa

Olimpia	1–1	Broncos

=== Round 2 ===
Olimpia	1–0	Universidad

=== Round 3 ===
Olimpia	0–1	Campamento
		Díaz

=== Round 4 ===
7 March 1976

Vida	1–0	España

La Ceiba
7 March 1976

Platense	1–0	Olimpia

San Pedro Sula
7 March 1976

Motagua	1–0	Campamento

Tegucigalpa

=== Round 5 ===
14 March 1976

Vida	1–0	Campamento

La Ceiba
14 March 1976

Olimpia	1–1	Federal
		Meza

Tegucigalpa

=== Round 6 ===
21 March 1976

Federal	0–1	Vida

Tegucigalpa
21 March 1976

Olimpia	0–0	Motagua

Tegucigalpa

=== Round 7 ===
Vida	–	Olimpia

La Ceiba

=== Round 11 ===
9 May 1976

Broncos	0–0	Universidad

Choluteca
9 May 1976

Marathón	0–0	Platense

San Pedro Sula
9 May 1976

España	1–0	Motagua
Bailey

San Pedro Sula
9 May 1976

Federal	1–0	Campamento
Rodríguez

Tegucigalpa
9 May 1976

Olimpia	0–0	Vida

Tegucigalpa

=== Cuadrangular ===
17 October 1976

Motagua	1–0	España

Tegucigalpa
24 October 1976

España	3–1	Marathón
Ortega; Ferreira		Hernández

San Pedro Sula
31 October 1976

Motagua	1–0	Marathón
Zelaya

Tegucigalpa
7 November 1976

Motagua	2–1	Vida

Tegucigalpa
9 November 1976

Marathón	1–2	España
Bonilla		Rodríguez

San Pedro Sula
21 November 1976

España	0–1	Motagua

San Pedro Sula
28 November 1976

Marathón	4–3	Motagua
Morales; López; Charles; Foster		Álvarez; Obando; Maradiaga

San Pedro Sula

España	2–1	Vida

San Pedro Sula

Vida	1–2	España

La Ceiba

Vida	1–1	Motagua

La Ceiba

=== Unknown rounds ===
26 February 1976	Marathón	0–2	Motagua	San Pedro Sula
CST				Stadium: Estadio General Francisco Morazán

29 February 1976	España	0–1	Campamento	San Pedro Sula
CST				Stadium: Estadio General Francisco Morazán

14 March 1976	Platense	0–0	Motagua	San Pedro Sula
CST				Stadium: Estadio General Francisco Morazán

25 March 1976	Motagua	1–0	Broncos	Tegucigalpa
CST				Stadium: Estadio Tiburcio Carías Andino

4 April 1976	Motagua	2–0	Vida	Tegucigalpa
CST	Obando			Stadium: Estadio Tiburcio Carías Andino

8 April 1976	Motagua	2–0	Federal	Tegucigalpa
CST				Stadium: Estadio Tiburcio Carías Andino

2 May 1976	Vida	3–1	Broncos	La Ceiba
CST	Caballero			Stadium: Estadio Nilmo Edwards

2 May 1976	Federal	0–2	Motagua	Tegucigalpa
CST				Stadium: Estadio Tiburcio Carías Andino

27 May 1976	Motagua	2–0	Campamento	Tegucigalpa
CST	Iubini; Zelaya			Stadium: Estadio Tiburcio Carías Andino

6 June 1976	Motagua	1–0	Vida
CST

4 July 1976	Broncos	0–0	Olimpia	Choluteca
CST				Stadium: Estadio Fausto Flores Lagos

18 July 1976	Olimpia	2–0	Campamento	Tegucigalpa
CST	Chávez; Brand			Stadium: Estadio Tiburcio Carías Andino

1 August 1976	Marathón	1–1	Motagua	San Pedro Sula
CST	Hernández		Obando	Stadium: Estadio General Francisco Morazán

8 August 1976	España	2–1	Federal	San Pedro Sula
CST			Meza	Stadium: Estadio General Francisco Morazán

22 August 1976	Motagua	1–0	Olimpia	Tegucigalpa
CST	Juvini			Stadium: Estadio Tiburcio Carías Andino

29 August 1976	España	4–0	Broncos	San Pedro Sula
CST	Villegas			Stadium: Estadio General Francisco Morazán

5 September 1976	Marathón	7–0	Campamento	San Pedro Sula
CST				Stadium: Estadio General Francisco Morazán

12 September 1976	Motagua	1–1	Broncos
CST

	Broncos	0–1	Federal	Choluteca
CST				Stadium: Estadio Fausto Flores Lagos

	Motagua	3–0	Universidad	Tegucigalpa
CST	Sosa; Guifarro; Zelaya			Stadium: Estadio Tiburcio Carías Andino

	Olimpia	0–0	Campamento	Tegucigalpa
CST				Stadium: Estadio Tiburcio Carías Andino
