= 1978–79 Honduran Liga Nacional =

Liga Nacional
- Season: 1978–79
- Champions: Motagua (4th)
- Relegated: Tiburones
- CONCACAF Champions' Cup: None
- Copa Fraternidad: Motagua; Real España; Olimpia; Broncos
- Matches: 158
- Goals: 281 (1.78 per match)
- Top goalscorer: Bernárdez (15)
- All statistics correct as of 28 January 1979.

The 1978–79 Honduran Liga Nacional season was the 13th edition of the Honduran Liga Nacional. The format of the tournament remained the same as the previous season. C.D. Motagua won the title after defeating Real C.D. España in the finals. It's unclear why no Honduran representation was sent to the 1979 CONCACAF Champions' Cup. Nevertheless, Motagua, Real España, Olimpia and Broncos obtained berths to the 1979 Copa Fraternidad.

== 1978–79 teams ==
- Broncos (Choluteca)
- Marathón (San Pedro Sula)
- Motagua (Tegucigalpa)
- Olimpia (Tegucigalpa)
- Platense (Puerto Cortés)
- Real España (San Pedro Sula)
- Tiburones (Choluteca, promoted)
- Universidad (Tegucigalpa)
- Victoria (La Ceiba)
- Vida (La Ceiba)

== Regular season ==
=== Standings ===
Pos	Team	Pld	W	D	L	GF	GA	GD	Pts	Qualification or relegation
1	Motagua (Note: Motagua secured final spot as regular season winner.)	27	13	12	2	34	15	+19	38	Qualified to the Final round (Note: Top five qualify to final round.)
2	Olimpia	27	13	7	7	29	17	+12	33	Qualified to the Final round
3	Real España	27	8	11	8	20	17	+3	27	Qualified to the Final round
4	Marathón	27	7	12	8	26	26	0	26	Qualified to the Final round
5	Platense	27	8	10	9	21	23	−2	26	Qualified to the repechage (Note: Extra match required between Platense and Broncos to decide fifth place.)
6	Broncos	27	5	16	6	17	19	−2	26	Qualified to the repechage
7	Universidad	27	8	10	9	17	20	−3	26	
8	Vida	27	7	12	8	23	27	−4	26	
9	Victoria	27	5	14	8	20	29	−9	24	
10	Tiburones	27	4	10	13	20	34	−14	18	Relegated to Segunda División (Note: Tiburones relegated.)

=== Fifth place playoff ===
12 October 1978 Playoff	Broncos	0–1	Platense	El Progreso, Yoro
(UTC−06:00)		Awarded to Broncos	Flores	Stadium: Estadio Humberto Micheletti

- Broncos advanced to Pentagonal on awarded points.

== Final round ==
=== Pentagonal standings ===
Pos	Team	Pld	W	D	L	GF	GA	GD	Pts	Qualification or relegation
1	Real España	8	5	3	0	14	6	+8	13	Qualified to the Final (Note: Real España qualified to final as winner of Pentagonal.)
2	Motagua	8	4	1	3	12	8	+4	9	
3	Olimpia	8	2	4	2	6	5	+1	8	
4	Broncos	8	2	4	2	12	13	−1	8	
5	Marathón	8	0	2	6	3	15	−12	2	

=== Final ===
25 January 1979 1st leg	Motagua	1–0	Real España	Tegucigalpa, Francisco Morazán
	Bernárdez			Stadium: Estadio Tiburcio Carías Andino

28 January 1979 2nd leg	Real España	1–4	Motagua	San Pedro Sula, Cortés
	Bailey		Reyes; Maradiaga	Stadium: Estadio Francisco Morazán; Referee: Carlos Ortiz

== Top scorer ==
- (Honduras) Salvador Bernárdez (Motagua) with 15 goals

== Squads ==
Broncos
(Honduras) German "Loco" Guzmán	(Costa Rica) Carlos Luis "Macho" Arrieta	(Honduras) Cruz Ramón Serrano "Guaya" Cruz
Marathón
(Argentina) Daniel Argelio Romero	(Honduras) Óscar Machigua	(Honduras) René "Maravilla" Suazo
(Honduras) Exequiel "Estupiñán" García	(Honduras) Hernán Santiago "Cortés" García Martínez	(Honduras) Manuel Rodríguez
(Honduras) David Sánchez	(Honduras) Tomás Wood	(Honduras) Manuel Doblado
(Honduras) Leónidas Nolasco	(Argentina) Erick Cabalceta	(Honduras) Rigoberto Castro
(Honduras) Richard Kenneth Payne	(Honduras) Arturo Torres "Pacharaca" Bonilla	(Honduras) Roberto Bailey
(Honduras) Ramón "Albañil" Osorio	(Honduras) Francisco Javier Toledo	(Honduras) Julio "Ruso" Bonilla
(Honduras) Ricardo Nuila	(Honduras) Osman Peña	(Honduras) Óscar Rolando "Martillo" Hernández
(Honduras) Mario López	(Honduras) Carlos "Calín" Morales	(Uruguay) Iván Ramos
(Honduras) Félix Concepción Carranza	(Honduras) Jorge Alberto "Cuca" Bueso Iglesias	(Honduras) Celso Fredy Güity
(Honduras) Porfirio Armando Betancourt	(Honduras) Luis Alonso Guzmán Velásquez
Motagua
(Nicaragua) Roger Mayorga	(Honduras) Alcides Morales	(Brazil) Roberto Abrussezze
(Honduras) Salvador "Pichini" Bernárdez	(Honduras) Carlos Mejía	(Honduras) Marco Tulio "Coyol" López
(Honduras) Francisco "Pantera" Velásquez	(Honduras) Roberto "Muñiña" Escalante	(Honduras) Héctor "Lin" Zelaya
(Honduras) René "Kun Fu" Velásquez	(Honduras) Camilo Mejía	(Honduras) Juan Ramón Aguilar
(Honduras) Rubén "Chamaco" Guifarro	(Honduras) Marco Tulio Andino	(Honduras) Roxne Romero
(Brazil) Ennos Pereira	(Honduras) Rigoberto Sosa	(Honduras) Luis Alberto "Chito" Reyes
(Honduras) Ramón Enrique "Primitivo" Maradiaga	(Honduras) Héctor Ramón "Pecho de Aguila" Zelaya	(Honduras) Antonio Antonio Obando
(Honduras) Samuel Rivera	(Honduras) Edgardo Sosa	(Honduras) José Luis Zelaya
(Honduras) Mario Moncada	(Honduras) Feliciano Guardado	(Honduras) Mariano Godoy
(Honduras) David Bueso	(Honduras) David Medina	(Argentina) Alberto Centurión
Olimpia
(Honduras) Belarmino Rivera	(Honduras) Francisco Zelaya Pastrana	(Honduras) Alejandro "Indio" Ruiz
(Honduras) Vicente Suazo	(Honduras) Óscar García	(Honduras) Héctor Uclés
(Honduras) Víctor Romero	(Honduras) Víctor "Calero" Lozano	(Honduras) Óscar Batíz
(Honduras) Adán Amador	(Honduras) Carlos Figueroa	(Honduras) Manuel Gámez
(Honduras) Arturo Cáceres	(Honduras) Óscar Banegas	(Honduras) José Amador
(Chile) Joaquín del Arca	(Honduras) Osmán Zelaya	(Honduras) Ramón Antonio "Pilín" Brand
(Honduras) Roger Chavarría	(Honduras) Prudencio "Tecate" Norales	(Honduras) Rigoberto "Shula" Gómez
(Honduras) Jorge Alberto "Perro" González	(Honduras) Samuel Montoya	(Uruguay) Walter Chávez
(Chile) Mario Hernán Juviny Carreño	(Argentina) Ricardo Carreño	(Honduras) Carlos Maldonado
(Honduras) Walter "Estupiñán" Amador	(Honduras) José Antonio García	(Honduras) Jorge Alberto "Indio" Urquía Elvir
Platense
(Honduras) Arnulfo Echeverría	(Honduras) Manuel de Jesús Fuentes	(Honduras) Tomás Cedricks Ewens "Quito" Wagner
(Honduras) Danilo "Pulga" Flores	(Honduras) Arturo Payne	(Chile) Rubén Rodríguez Peña Llantén
(Honduras) Alex Rodríguez
Real España
(Honduras) Julio César "El Tile" Arzú	(Honduras) Antonio "Gato" Pavón Molina	(Honduras) Walter Jimminson
(Chile) Julio del Carmen Tapia Callao	(Honduras) José Estanislao "Tanayo" Ortega	(Honduras) Clinton Campbell
(Honduras) Gustavo Portillo	(Honduras) Junior Rashford Costly	(Honduras) Marvin Zúniga
(Brazil) Alberto Ferreira da Silva	(Honduras) José Luis Cruz Figueroa	(Honduras) Jimmy James Bailey
(Honduras) Allan Costly	(Honduras) Julio Roberto "Chino" Ortiz	(Honduras) Jimmy Steward
(Honduras) Edith Hernando Contreras
Tiburones
(Honduras) Juan Jerezano	(Honduras) "Yuyuga" Flores	(Honduras) David Silva
(Honduras) Salustio Pacheco	(Honduras) Alejandro Palacios	(Honduras) "Nilo" Herrera
(Honduras) Edgar Alfaro	(Honduras) Agustín Alemán	(Honduras) Pedro Colón
(Honduras) José Reynaldo Villagra	(Honduras) Domingo Martínez
Universidad
(Nicaragua) Roger Mayorga	(Honduras) Otoniel Oliva	(Honduras) Joaquín Pavón Sequeira
(Nicaragua) Mauricio Cruz Jiron	(Honduras) Daniel "Diablo" Sambulá	(Honduras) José Salomón "Turco" Nazzar
Victoria
(Honduras) Óscar Figueroa	(Honduras) Reynaldo Mejía Ortega	(Brazil) Camilo Bonifacio
(Honduras) Roberto Reynaldo "Robot" Bailey Sargent	(Honduras) Efraín Martínez "Diablillo" Amaya	(Honduras) David Goff
(Brazil) Pedro Caetano da Silva	(Honduras) Luis Alonso "Chorompo" Zúniga	(Honduras) Francisco Jiménez
(Honduras) Miguel Ángel "Primitivo" Ortiz	(Honduras) Fausto Humberto "Chiva" Ruiz	(Honduras) Luis Edgardo Meléndez
Vida
(Honduras) Gustavo Adolfo "Gorcha" Collins	(Honduras) Ramón Nectally "Liebre" Guardado	(Honduras) Carlos Humberto "Papeto" Lobo
(Honduras) Edgardo Williams	(Honduras) Abraham Osorio	(Honduras) Peter Buchanan
(Honduras) Hermenegildo Orellana	(Honduras) César "Cesarín" Aguirre	(Honduras) Marco Tulio "Socadito" Zelaya
(Honduras) Carlos Aguirre	(Honduras) Neptally "Liebre" Guardado	(Honduras) Carlos Johnson
(Honduras) Carlos Bejarano	(Honduras) Felipe "Embajador" Sánchez	(Honduras) Juan Dolmo Arzú
(Honduras) Mario Ardón	(Honduras) Roberto "Macho" Figueroa	(Honduras) Carlos Talbot
(Honduras) Manuel Gámez	(Honduras) Enrique "Palanca" Mendoza	(Honduras) Wilfredo Rodríguez
(Honduras) Carlos Orlando Caballero	(Honduras) Dennis "Bomba" Hinds	(Honduras) Arnulfo Ardón
(Honduras) Matilde Selim Lacayo	(Honduras) Carlos "Comay" Flores	(Honduras) Jesús "Bululo" Carías
(Honduras) Jorge Bernárdez	(Honduras) Jaime Morales	(Honduras) Roberto Maradiaga

== Known results ==
=== Round 1 ===
Real España	2–0	Tiburones
Pavón

=== Pentagonal place playoff ===
Platense	1–0	Broncos

=== Pentagonal ===
1978-10-22

Marathón	1–1	Olimpia

San Pedro Sula
1978-10-26

Real España	0–0	Olimpia

San Pedro Sula
1978-10-28

Real España	4–3	Broncos
Costly; Bailey; Jiminson		Altamirano; Arzú; Cruz

San Pedro Sula
1978-10-29

Motagua	2–0	Marathón
Bernárdez; López

Danlí
1978-11-05

Real España	4–2	Motagua

San Pedro Sula
1978-11-09

Marathón	2–3	Broncos

San Pedro Sula
1978-11-12

Marathón	0–1	Real España
		Bailey

San Pedro Sula
1978-11-12

Olimpia	1–0	Motagua
Gámez

Tegucigalpa
1978-11-19

Marathón	0–3	Motagua
		Escalante; Godoy; Obando

San Pedro Sula
1979-01-07

Olimpia	0–0	Real España

Tegucigalpa
1979-01-10

Real España	3–0	Marathón
Bailey; Jimminson

San Pedro Sula
1979-01-14

Olimpia	2–0	Marathón

Tegucigalpa
1979-01-17

Motagua	1–0	Olimpia
Obando

Tegucigalpa
1979-01-21

Motagua	0–1	Real España

Tegucigalpa

Broncos	0–0	Marathón

Broncos	1–1	Real España

=== Unknown rounds ===
19 February 1978	Victoria	1–1	Vida	La Ceiba
CST	Meléndez			Stadium: Estadio Nilmo Edwards

5 March 1978	Broncos	0–1	Tiburones	Choluteca
CST			Herrera	Stadium: Estadio Fausto Flores Lagos

29 March 1978	Marathón	3–1	Olimpia	San Pedro Sula
CST				Stadium: Estadio General Francisco Morazán

9 April 1978	Platense	2–0	Motagua	Puerto Cortés
CST				Stadium: Estadio Excélsior

9 April 1978	Tiburones	1–2	Marathón	Tegucigalpa
CST				Stadium: Estadio Tiburcio Carías Andino

23 April 1978	Platense	1–1	Marathón	Puerto Cortés
CST				Stadium: Estadio Excélsior

23 April 1978	Motagua	v	Tiburones
CST	Obando

30 April 1978	Motagua	v	Universidad
CST	Obando

7 May 1978	Tiburones	1–1	Broncos	Choluteca
CST	Arzú		Martínez	Stadium: Estadio Fausto Flores Lagos

7 May 1978	Marathón	1–0	Real España	El Progreso
CST	Peña			Stadium: Estadio Humberto Micheletti

14 May 1978	Motagua	1–0	Olimpia	Tegucigalpa
CST	Bernárdez			Stadium: Estadio Tiburcio Carías Andino

21 May 1978	Motagua	v	Broncos
CST	Obando

4 June 1978	Platense	1–2	Real España	Puerto Cortés
CST				Stadium: Estadio Excélsior

25 June 1978	Olimpia	0–1	Marathón	Tegucigalpa
CST			Osorio	Stadium: Estadio Tiburcio Carías Andino

2 July 1978	Motagua	v	Vida
CST	Obando

23 July 1978	Motagua	v	Vida
CST	Obando

31 July 1978	Motagua	2–1	Universidad	Danlí
CST				Stadium: Estadio Marcelo Tinoco

6 August 1978	Broncos	1–1	Motagua	Choluteca
CST	Guardado		Bernárdez	Stadium: Estadio Fausto Flores Lagos

6 August 1978	Platense	1–0	Marathón	Puerto Cortés
CST	Castillo			Stadium: Estadio Excélsior

6 August 1978	Olimpia	0–0	Universidad	Danlí
CST				Stadium: Estadio Marcelo Tinoco

27 August 1978	Motagua	4–0	Platense	Danlí
CST	Reyes; Maradiaga; Bernárdez			Stadium: Estadio Marcelo Tinoco

10 September 1978	Broncos	1–1	Tiburones	Choluteca
CST	Altamirano		Palacios	Stadium: Estadio Fausto Flores Lagos

10 September 1978	Real España	3–0	Marathón	El Progreso
CST	Bailey; Tapia; Portillo			Stadium: Estadio Humberto Micheletti

10 September 1978	Motagua	0–0	Olimpia	Danlí
CST				Stadium: Estadio Marcelo Tinoco

15 September 1978	Vida	2–2	Universidad	La Ceiba
CST	Figueroa		Fernández; Zavala	Stadium: Estadio Nilmo Edwards

24 September 1978

Tiburones	0–3	Motagua
		Maradiaga; Reyes; Centurión

Choluteca
1 October 1978

Real España	0–2	Olimpia
		Norales; González

San Pedro Sula
3 October 1978

Motagua	4–2	Victoria
López; Reyes; Bernárdez		Amaya; Zelaya 0' (a.g.)

Danlí
12 October 1978

Platense	2–1	Broncos

El Progreso

Marathón	0–1	Universidad

San Pedro Sula
