= 1979–80 Honduran Liga Nacional =

Liga Nacional
- Season: 1979–80
- Champions: Marathón (1st)
- Relegated: Portuario
- CONCACAF Champions' Cup: Marathón; Universidad
- Copa Fraternidad: Marathón; Universidad; Broncos; Victoria
- Matches: 158
- Goals: 360 (2.28 per match)
- Top goalscorer: Norales (15)
- All statistics correct as of 16 December 1979.

The 1979–80 Honduran Liga Nacional season was the 14th edition of the Honduran Liga Nacional. The format of the tournament remained the same as the previous season. C.D. Marathón won the title after defeating Universidad in the finals. Both teams qualified to the 1980 CONCACAF Champions' Cup. Additionally, Marathón, Universidad, C.D. Broncos and C.D. Victoria obtained berths to the 1980 Copa Fraternidad.

== 1979–80 teams ==
- Broncos (Choluteca)
- Marathón (San Pedro Sula)
- Motagua (Tegucigalpa)
- Olimpia (Tegucigalpa)
- Platense (Puerto Cortés)
- Portuario (Puerto Cortés, promoted)
- Real España (San Pedro Sula)
- Universidad (Tegucigalpa)
- Victoria (La Ceiba)
- Vida (La Ceiba)

== Regular season ==
=== Standings ===
Pos	Team	Pld	W	D	L	GF	GA	GD	Pts	Qualification or relegation
1	Marathón (Note: Marathón clinched final spot as Regular season winner.)	27	17	3	7	40	23	+17	37	Qualified to the Final round (Note: Top five qualify to Final round.)
2	Olimpia	27	13	7	7	43	36	+7	33	Qualified to the Final round
3	Broncos	27	11	8	8	32	27	+5	30	Qualified to the Final round
4	Victoria	27	10	7	10	34	30	+4	27	Qualified to the Final round
5	Motagua	27	9	9	9	29	29	0	27	Forced to playoff (Note: Extra match required between Motagua and Universidad for fifth place.)
6	Universidad	27	9	9	9	22	22	0	27	Forced to playoff
7	Platense	27	7	12	8	27	31	−4	26	
8	Real España	27	7	9	11	28	23	+5	23	
9	Vida	27	6	9	12	30	38	−8	21	
10	Portuario	27	6	7	14	29	55	−26	19	Relegated to Segunda División (Note: Portuario relegated to second division.)

=== Fifth place playoff ===
17 October 1979 Playoff	Motagua	1–2 (a.e.t.)	Universidad
	Obando

== Final round ==
=== Pentagonal standings ===
Pos	Team	Pld	W	D	L	GF	GA	GD	Pts	Qualification or relegation
1	Universidad	8	4	4	0	7	3	+4	12	Qualified to the Final (Note: Universidad qualified to the final as Final round winners.)
2	Victoria	8	3	2	3	10	10	0	8	
3	Marathón	8	3	1	4	12	11	+1	7	
4	Broncos	8	2	3	3	8	11	−3	7	
5	Olimpia	8	2	2	4	4	6	−2	6	

=== Final ===
9 December 1979 1st leg	Marathón	1–0	Universidad	San Pedro Sula, Cortés
	Bailey			Stadium: Estadio Francisco Morazán

Marathón	Universidad

GK	–	(Uruguay) Jorge Phoyoú
RB	–	(Honduras) René Suazo
CB	–	(Honduras) Richard Payne
CB	–	(Honduras) Hernán García
LB	–	(Honduras) José Martínez
CM	–	(Honduras) Javier Toledo
CM	–	(Argentina) Alberto Merelles
AM	–	(Honduras) Arturo Bonilla
RF	–	(Honduras) Félix Carranza
CF	–	(Honduras) Roberto Bailey
LF	–	(Honduras) Jorge Bueso
Substitutions:
–	–	–
–	–	–
–	–	–
Manager:
(Honduras) Ángel Ramón Rodríguez

GK	–	(Nicaragua) Roger Mayorga
DF	–	(Honduras) –
DF	–	(Honduras) –
DF	–	(Honduras) –
DF	–	(Honduras) –
MF	–	(Honduras) –
MF	–	(Honduras) –
MF	–	(Honduras) Fabricio Amador
MF	–	(Honduras) –
FW	–	(Honduras) Daniel Sambulá
FW	–	(Honduras) –
Substitutions:
–	–	–
–	–	–
–	–	–
Manager:
(Honduras) Alfonso Uclés

16 December 1979 2nd leg	Universidad	0–1	Marathón	Tegucigalpa, Francisco Morazán
			Bailey	Stadium: Estadio Tiburcio Carías Andino

Universidad	Marathón

GK	–	(Nicaragua) Roger Mayorga
DF	–	(Honduras) –
DF	–	(Honduras) –
DF	–	(Honduras) –
DF	–	(Honduras) –
MF	–	(Honduras) –
MF	–	(Honduras) –
MF	–	(Honduras) Fabricio Amador
MF	–	(Honduras) –
FW	–	(Honduras) Daniel Sambulá
FW	–	(Honduras) –
Substitutions:
–	–	–
–	–	–
–	–	–
Manager:
(Honduras) Alfonso Uclés

GK	–	(Uruguay) Jorge Phoyoú
RB	–	(Honduras) René Suazo
CB	–	(Honduras) Richard Payne
CB	–	(Honduras) Hernán García
LB	–	(Honduras) Ramón Osorio
CM	–	(Honduras) Javier Toledo
CM	–	(Argentina) Alberto Merelles
AM	–	(Honduras) Arturo Bonilla
LF	–	(Honduras) Jorge Bueso
CF	–	(Honduras) Roberto Bailey
RF	–	(Honduras) Félix Carranza
Substitutions:
–	–	–
–	–	–
–	–	–
Manager:
(Honduras) Ángel Ramón Rodríguez

== Top scorer ==
- (Honduras) Prudencio "Tecate" Norales (Olimpia) with 15 goals

== Squads ==
Atlético Portuario
(Honduras) Eristeo Gómez	(Honduras) Jorge Alberto "Camioncito" Duarte	(Honduras) Aníbal Bravo
(Honduras) Carlos "Calín" Morales	(Honduras) Orlando "Choloma" Rodríguez	(Honduras) Ernesto Bravo
(Honduras) Edgardo Núñez	(Honduras) Óscar Rolando "Martillo" Hernández	(Costa Rica) Roscoe Charles
(Honduras) Pablo Orellana	(Costa Rica) Erick Cabalceta	(Honduras) Ramón Cruz Colindres
Broncos
(Honduras) German "Loco" Guzmán	(Uruguay) Iván Ramos	(Argentina) Luis Alberto Escaurizza
(Honduras) Cruz Ramón Serrano "Guaya" Cruz
Marathón
(Uruguay) Jorge Phoyoú	(Honduras) Roberto Reynaldo "Robot" Bailey Sargent	(Honduras) Hernán Santiago "Cortés" García Martínez
(Argentina) Juan Carlos Weber	(Honduras) Luis Alonso Guzmán Velásquez	(Honduras) Carlos Solís
(Honduras) Pablo "Payique" Espinoza	(Honduras) Richard Kenneth Payne	(Honduras) Alfonso Munguía
(Honduras) José Martínez	(Honduras) Carlos Guevara	(Argentina) Alberto Merelles
(Honduras) Arturo Payne	(Argentina) Roberto Zilkiewicks	(Honduras) Celso Güity
(Honduras) Porfirio Armando Betancourt	(Honduras) Efraín "Pucho" Osorio	(Honduras) Exequiel "Estupiñán" García
(Honduras) Ramón "Albañil" Osorio	(Honduras) Jorge Alberto "Cuca" Bueso Iglesias	(Honduras) Félix Concepción Carranza
(Honduras) René "Maravilla" Suazo	(Honduras) Camilo Mejía	(Honduras) Juan Contreras
(Honduras) Jorge Sánchez	(Honduras) Leónidas Nolasco	(Honduras) Carlos "Calín" Morales
(Honduras) Francisco Javier Toledo	(Honduras) Arturo Torres "Pacharaca" Bonilla	(Honduras) Gilberto Leonel Machado García
(Honduras) Carlos Mejía
Motagua
(Honduras) Héctor Ramón "Pecho de Aguila" Zelaya	(Honduras) Luis Alberto "Chito" Reyes	(Honduras) Rigoberto Sosa
(Honduras) Héctor "Lin" Zelaya
Olimpia
(Honduras) Raúl David Fúnez	(Honduras) Prudencio "Tecate" Norales	(Honduras) Ramón Antonio "Pilín" Brand
(Honduras) José Salomón "Turco" Nazzar	(Honduras) Jorge Alberto "Perro" Gonzáles	(Honduras) Jorge Alberto "Indio" Urquía Elvir
(Honduras) Horacio Parham Castro
Platense
(Honduras) Juan Jerezano	(Honduras) Tony Laing	(Honduras) Júnior Rashford Costly
(Honduras) Tomás Cedricks Ewens "Quito" Wagner	(Honduras) Edith Hernando Contreras	(Honduras) Alex Rodríguez
Real España
(Honduras) Jimmy Steward	(Honduras) Julio César "El Tile" Arzú	(Honduras) Antonio "Gato" Pavón Molina
(Honduras) Walter Jimminson	(Chile) Julio del Carmen Tapia Callao	(Honduras) Edelmín "Pando" Castro
(Brazil) Alberto Ferreira da Silva	(Honduras) José Luis Cruz Figueroa	(Honduras) José Estanislao "Tanayo" Ortega
(Honduras) Julio Roberto "Chino" Ortiz
Universidad
(Nicaragua) Roger Mayorga	(Honduras) "Pirata" Fernández	(Honduras) Daniel "Diablo" Sambulá
Victoria
(Honduras) Luis Alonso "Chorompo" Zúniga	(Honduras) Ramón Nectaly "Liebre" Guardado	(Honduras) Efraín Martínez "Diablillo" Amaya
(Honduras) José Reynaldo Villagra	(Honduras) David Goff	(Honduras) Francisco Jiménez
(Honduras) Miguel Angel "Primitivo" Ortiz	(Honduras) Fausto Humberto "Chiva" Ruiz	(Colombia) Marco Tulio López
Vida
(Honduras) Dennis Hinds	(Honduras) Matilde Selím Lacayo	(Honduras) Carlos Orlando Caballero
(Honduras) Roberto "Macho" Figueroa	(Honduras) Junior Mejía

== Known results ==
=== Round 1 ===
Vida	3 – 1	Platense
Hinds

La Ceiba

=== Pentagonal ===
28 October 1979

Olimpia	1 – 0	Marathón

Tegucigalpa
11 November 1979

Marathón	2 – 0	Olimpia

San Pedro Sula
14 November 1979

Universidad	1 – 0	Victoria
Aguilar

Tegucigalpa
18 November 1979

Olimpia	0 – 1	Victoria
		Villagra

Tegucigalpa

=== Unknown rounds ===
4 March 1979

Victoria	5–0	Atlético Portuario

La Ceiba
11 March 1979

Olimpia	2–0	Motagua
Romero; Parham

Tegucigalpa
8 April 1979

Universidad	1–0	Real España
Fernández

Tegucigalpa
29 April 1979

Universidad	2–0	Motagua
Fernández 1'

Tegucigalpa
6 May 1979

Olimpia	2–2	Broncos

Tegucigalpa
14 June 1979

Marathón	1–0	Olimpia

San Pedro Sula
17 June 1979

Victoria	1–0	Olimpia
López

La Ceiba
17 June 1979

Real España	3–2	Motagua
Castro

San Pedro Sula
15 July 1979

Platense	4–1	Broncos

San Pedro Sula
22 July 1979

Olimpia	6–2	Atlético Portuario
Norales; Chavarría		Charles; Duarte

Tegucigalpa

5 August 1979	Platense	1–1	Universidad	San Pedro Sula
	de Tarso		Elvir	Stadium: Estadio General Francisco Morazán

2 September 1979	Olimpia	3–2	Victoria	Tegucigalpa
	Norales; González		Pedrinho; Chavarría	Stadium: Estadio Tiburcio Carías Andino

23 September 1979	Vida	1–0	Real España	La Ceiba
	Figueroa			Stadium: Estadio Nilmo Edwards

23 September 1979	Platense	1–1	Motagua	San Pedro Sula
	Wagner		Centurión	Stadium: Estadio General Francisco Morazán

23 September 1979	Universidad	4–1	Olimpia	Tegucigalpa
				Stadium: Estadio Tiburcio Carías Andino

Platense	0–0	Atlético Portuario

Puerto Cortés

Platense	2–1	Atlético Portuario

San Pedro Sula

Platense	1–1	Atlético Portuario

San Pedro Sula

Motagua	1–2	Olimpia

Tegucigalpa

Olimpia	2–1	Motagua

Tegucigalpa

== Curiosities ==
On 8 April 1979, Real C.D. España played two games. They lost 1–0 against Universidad at Tegucigalpa in the domestic league and 1–0 against Aurora in Guatemala for the 1979 Copa Fraternidad finals.
