= 1983–84 Honduran Liga Nacional =

Liga Nacional
- Season: 1983–84
- Champions: Vida (2nd)
- Relegated: Dandy
- CONCACAF Champions' Cup: Vida; Universidad
- Matches: 180
- Goals: 336 (1.87 per match)
- Top goalscorer: Centeno (17)

The 1983–84 Honduran Liga Nacional season was the 18th edition of the Honduran Liga Nacional. The format of the tournament consisted of a four round-robin schedule. C.D.S. Vida won the title and qualified to the 1984 CONCACAF Champions' Cup along with runners-up Universidad.

== 1983–84 teams ==
- Dandy (San Pedro Sula)
- Juventud Morazánica (Tegucigalpa)
- Marathón (San Pedro Sula)
- Motagua (Tegucigalpa)
- Olimpia (Tegucigalpa)
- Platense (Puerto Cortés, promoted)
- Real España (San Pedro Sula)
- Universidad (Tegucigalpa)
- Victoria (La Ceiba)
- Vida (La Ceiba)

== Regular season ==
=== Standings ===
Pos	Team	Pld	W	D	L	GF	GA	GD	Pts	Qualification or relegation
1	Vida (Note: Vida champions as regular season winners.)	36	13	18	5	39	28	+11	44	Qualified to the 1984 CONCACAF Champions' Cup
2	Universidad	36	13	14	9	40	26	+14	40	Qualified to the 1984 CONCACAF Champions' Cup
3	Marathón	36	14	12	10	36	32	+4	40	
4	Olimpia	36	13	13	10	39	26	+13	39	
5	Real España	36	14	11	11	35	30	+5	39	
6	Motagua	36	14	8	14	36	36	0	36	
7	Victoria	36	12	10	14	31	40	−9	34	
8	Platense	36	8	16	12	29	39	−10	32	
9	Juventud Morazánica	36	7	15	14	29	44	−15	29	
10	Dandy	36	6	15	15	22	35	−13	27	Relegated to Segunda División (Note: Dandy relegated to second division.)

Notes:
- No post-season this year.

== Top scorer ==
- (Honduras) Raúl Centeno Gamboa (Platense) with 17 goals

== Squads ==
Dandy
(Honduras) Luis Alonso Guzmán Velásquez	(Honduras) Rigoberto Escalón	(Honduras) Oscar Villegas
(Honduras) Efraín "Pucho" Osorio	(Honduras) Roberto Escalón	(Honduras) Oscar Núñez
(Honduras) Oscar Montoya	(Honduras) Carlos Castellanos	(Honduras) René Orellana
(Honduras) Orlando Garay	(Honduras) Ricardo Castro	(Honduras) Carlos Flores
(Honduras) Edward Kisling	(Honduras) Carlos Alvarez	(Honduras) Jorge Martínez
(Honduras) Carlos Banegas	(Honduras) Roberto Moreno	(Honduras) Oscar "Hormiga" Muñoz
(Honduras) José Molina	(Honduras) Carlos Ramírez	(Honduras) Roger Valladares
(Honduras) Eleázar Peña	(Honduras) Jorge "Chino" Euceda	(Honduras) Claudio Romano Castro
(Honduras) Daniel "Diablo" Sambulá	(Honduras) Apolonio Sambulá	(Honduras) Arnold Connor Costly
(Honduras) Arnaldo Guevara	(Honduras) Oscar Torres	(Brazil) Benedito Tiburcio
(Honduras) Julio "Banana" Alvarez	(Honduras) Marcial Bonilla	(Honduras) Roberto Castellanos
(Honduras) Oscar Machigua	(Honduras) Oscar "Chino" Brizuela	(Honduras) Mario Bustillo
(Honduras) Oscar Ríos	(Honduras) Luis Guerrero	(Honduras) Noé Meza
(Honduras) Pastor Martínez	(Honduras) Benito Suazo	(Honduras) Luis Guzmán
(Honduras) Julio "Chino" Ortiz	(Honduras) Francisco Sandoval	(Honduras) Oscar Orellana
(Honduras) Guillermo Bernárdez	(Honduras) Manuel Rivera	(Honduras) Oscar "Pito Loco" López
Juventud Morazánica
(Honduras) Jorge Hibrán Maldonado	(Honduras) Alfonso Ramón "Niño" López	(Honduras) Ramón Edgardo Moradel Zapata
(Honduras) Pancho Gonzalez	(Honduras) Kaco Reyes	(Honduras) Choreta Ordoñes
(Honduras) Crisanto Batista
Marathón
(Honduras) Hernán Santiago García Martínez	(Argentina) Juan Carlos Weber	(Honduras) Vicente Suazo
(Honduras) Gilberto Leonel Machado García	(Honduras) Celso Fredy Güity	(Honduras) Noel Omar Renderos
(Honduras) Delio Billonay Fajardo	(Honduras) Jorge Alberto "Cuca" Bueso Iglesias	(Honduras) Roberto Reynaldo "Robot" Bailey Sargent
(Honduras) Arturo Torres "Pacharaca" Bonilla	(Honduras) Oswaldo Zaldívar	(Honduras) Ciro Paulino "Palic" Castillo
Motagua
(Honduras) Roy Arturo Padilla Bardales	(Honduras) Juan Gómez Ortiz	(Honduras) Angel Antonio Obando
(Honduras) Luis Alberto "Chito" Reyes	(Honduras) Roberto "Muñiña" Escalante	(Honduras) Carlos Cruz Padilla
(Honduras) Ramón Enrique "Primitivo" Maradiaga	(Honduras) Amílcar Leonel Suazo	(Honduras) Frank Ponce
(Honduras) Oscar Medina	(Chile) Mario Hernán Juviny Carreño	(Honduras) Alcides Morales
(Honduras) José María "Chema" Durón	(Honduras) Feliciano Guardado	(Honduras) Héctor Ramón "Pecho de Aguila" Zelaya
Olimpia
(Honduras) Prudencio "Tecate" Norales	(Honduras) Jorge Alberto "Perro" González	(Brazil) Edimar Luiz Marques
(Honduras) Juan Alberto Flores Maradiaga	(Honduras) José Emilio Martínez	(Uruguay) José Mario "Chueco" Figueroa
(Honduras) Ramón Antonio "Pilín" Brand
Platense
(Honduras) Juan Jerezano	(Honduras) Raúl Centeno Gamboa	(Honduras) Eugenio Dolmo Flores
(Honduras) Alex Rodríguez	(Honduras) Armando López "Babalaba" Bodden	(Honduras) Mario Ortega
(Honduras) Daniel "Diablo" Sambulá	(Honduras) Carlos Roberto Deras
Real España
(Honduras) Julio César "El Tile" Arzú	(Honduras) José Mauricio "Guicho" Fúnez Barrientos	(Honduras) Carlos Alberto Salgado
(Honduras) Junior Rashford Costly	(Honduras) Edith Hernando Contreras	(Honduras) Miguel Antonio "Hino" Mathews
(Honduras) Mario Bonilla	(Honduras) Esteban Pitío Centeno	(Honduras) Jimmy Steward
(Honduras) Nahúm Alberto Espinoza Zerón	(Honduras) Carlos Orlando Caballero
Universidad
(Honduras) José Marcial "Canelo" Murillo	(Honduras) José Salomón "Turco" Nazzar
Victoria
(Honduras) Raúl David Fúnez	(Honduras) Jorge Alberto "Camioncito" Duarte	(Honduras) Luis Alonso Zelaya
(Honduras) David Goff	(Honduras) Miguel Angel "Primitivo" Ortiz	(Honduras) Luis Alonso "Chorompo" Zúniga
Vida
(Honduras) Marvin Geovany "Mango" Henríquez	(Honduras) Luis Medina	(Honduras) Adolfo "Gorcha" Collins
(Honduras) Marco Tulio "Zocadito" Zelaya	(Honduras) Junior Mejía	(Honduras) Natividad Morales Barrios
(Honduras) Jesús "Bululo" Carías	(Honduras) José Enrique "Palanca" Mendoza	(Honduras) Esteban "Tan" Martínez
(Honduras) Cipriano Dueñas	(Honduras) Dennis Erwin "Bomba" Hinds	(Honduras) José Enrique "Palanca" Mendoza
(Honduras) Rudy Alberto Williams	(Honduras) Pablo Palma	(Honduras) Federico "Ico" Martínez
(Honduras) Juan Dolmo "Juanito" Arzú	(Honduras) Armando Vindel	(Honduras) Calos Humberto "Papeto" Lobo
(Honduras) Hermenegildo Orellana	(Honduras) Matilde Selím Lacayo	(Honduras) Joaquín Arrastoa
(Honduras) Danilo Carías	(Honduras) Osmán Zelaya

== Known results ==
=== Round 1 ===
Juventud Morazánica	1 – 1	Real España
		Bonilla

Marathón	1 – 1	Platense

=== Unknown rounds ===
20 February 1983

Victoria	1–0	Platense

La Ceiba
6 March 1983

Platense	2–1	Dandy

Puerto Cortés
14 April 1983

Motagua	1–0	Universidad

22 May 1983

Juventud Morazánica	1–5	Universidad

Tegucigalpa
1 June 1983

Motagua	3–1	Platense

Tegucigalpa
17 July 1983

Motagua	0–1	Dandy

Tegucigalpa
15 September 1983

Olimpia	6–0	Platense
Figueroa; Norales

Tegucigalpa
9 October 1983

Motagua	2–1	Olimpia

Tegucigalpa
16 October 1983

Universidad	2–0	Motagua
Altamirano

Tegucigalpa
19 October 1983

Olimpia	1–0	Marathón

Tegucigalpa
23 October 1983

Vida	2–1	Universidad
Zelaya		Altamirano

La Ceiba
23 October 1983

Real España	2–1	Olimpia
Arzú; Chavarría		Márquez

San Pedro Sula

Motagua	2–0	Dandy

Tegucigalpa

Dandy	1–2	Motagua

San Pedro Sula

Dandy	1–2	Motagua

San Pedro Sula
