= Motagua–Real España football rivalry =

Football rivalry in Honduras

Motagua – Real España
- First meeting: España 0–2 Motagua (15 September 1965)
- Latest meeting: Real España 0–1 Motagua (29 November 2020)
- Next meeting: TBD

Statistics
- Total meetings: 232
- All-time series (Liga Nacional only): 83–74–75 Motagua
- Largest victory: Motagua 7–1 Real España (14 November 2015)

Motagua	Real España

Motagua vs. Real España, is a classic football match played between Motagua from Tegucigalpa and Real España from San Pedro Sula, two of the most successful and popular football teams in Honduras. The Motagua–Real España classic is not as fierce as other derbies as these two teams have a good relationship with each other; from the players, to the board and the fans. However, they had played seven intense league finals, four won by Real España and three by Motagua. These two teams played the first ever final in Liga Nacional in the 1974–75 season.

== The finals ==
Motagua and Real España had played seven finals since the beginning of the Professional League in 1965–66, 4 won by Real España and 3 by Motagua.

=== 1974–75 ===
22 December 1974 1st leg	Motagua	0–1	España	Tegucigalpa, Francisco Morazán
16:00 CST			86' Pavón	Stadium: Estadio Tiburcio Carías Andino; Attendance: 14,000; Referee: Porfirio Guerra

- España won 1–0 on aggregate. Played in one leg.

=== 1976–77 ===
5 December 1976 1st leg	Motagua	0–0	España	Tegucigalpa, Francisco Morazán
16:00 CST				Stadium: Estadio Tiburcio Carías Andino; Referee: Porfirio Guerra

12 December 1976 2nd leg	España	4–1	Motagua	San Pedro Sula, Cortés
16:00 CST	Soto 11'; Yearwood 66'; Ferreira 81'; Bailey 89'		72' Maradiaga	Stadium: Estadio Francisco Morazán; Attendance: 14,000 (L. 55,800.92); Referee: Carlos Ortiz

- España won 4–1 on aggregate.

=== 1978–79 ===
25 January 1979 1st leg	Motagua	1–0	Real España	Tegucigalpa, Francisco Morazán
CST	Bernárdez			Stadium: Estadio Tiburcio Carías Andino

28 January 1979 2nd leg	Real España	1–4	Motagua	San Pedro Sula, Cortés
CST	Bailey		Reyes; Maradiaga	Stadium: Estadio Francisco Morazán; Referee: Carlos Ortiz

- Motagua won 5–1 on aggregate.

=== 1990–91 ===
10 February 1991 1st leg	Motagua	0–0	Real España	Tegucigalpa, Francisco Morazán
16:00 CST				Stadium: Estadio Tiburcio Carías Andino

16 February 1991 2nd leg	Real España	2–1	Motagua	San Pedro Sula, Cortés
19:30 CST	Smith		Murillo	Stadium: Estadio Francisco Morazán

- Real España won 2–1 on aggregate.

=== 1991–92 ===
29 February 1992 1st leg	Real España	0–0	Motagua	San Pedro Sula, Cortés
19:30 CST				Stadium: Estadio Francisco Morazán

5 March 1992 2nd leg	Motagua	1–0	Real España	Tegucigalpa, Francisco Morazán
19:30 CST	Ávila 63'			Stadium: Estadio Tiburcio Carías Andino; Attendance: 32,299; Referee: Gonzalo Tejada

- Motagua won 1–0 on aggregate.

=== 1997–98 ===
15 April 1998 1st leg	Real España	0–3	Motagua	San Pedro Sula, Cortés
19:30 CST			21' Ramírez; 55' Lagos; 89' Guevara	Stadium: Estadio Olímpico Metropolitano

18 April 1998 2nd leg	Motagua	2–1	Real España	Tegucigalpa, Francisco Morazán
19:30 CST	Ramírez 20'; Guevara 32'		26' Morales	Stadium: Estadio Tiburcio Carías Andino

- Motagua won 5–1 on aggregate.

=== 2017–18 ===
27 December 2017 1st leg	Real España	2–0	Motagua	San Pedro Sula, Cortés
17:30 CST	Vuelto 36' 76'			Stadium: Estadio Francisco Morazán; Attendance: 8,192; Referee: Héctor Rodríguez

30 December 2017 2nd leg	Motagua	2–1 (a.e.t.)	Real España	Tegucigalpa, Francisco Morazán
16:00 CST	Castillo 62' 73' (pen.)		108' Tejeda	Stadium: Estadio Tiburcio Carías Andino; Attendance: 13,052; Referee: Saíd Martínez

- Real España won 3–2 on aggregate.

== Head to Head ==
- As of 29 November 2020

At Tegucigalpa

Pos	Team	Pld	W	D	L	GF	GA	GD	Pts
1	Motagua	112	51	34	27	141	97	+44	136
2	Real España	112	27	34	51	97	141	−44	88

At San Pedro Sula

Pos	Team	Pld	W	D	L	GF	GA	GD	Pts
1	Real España	115	47	37	31	151	118	+33	131
2	Motagua	115	31	37	47	118	151	−33	99

At Estadio Olímpico only

Pos	Team	Pld	W	D	L	GF	GA	GD	Pts
1	Real España	18	10	5	3	30	25	+5	25
2	Motagua	18	3	5	10	25	30	−5	11

In neutral venue

Pos	Team	Pld	W	D	L	GF	GA	GD	Pts
1	Motagua	5	1	3	1	4	4	0	5
2	Real España	5	1	3	1	4	4	0	5

Overall

Pos	Team	Pld	W	D	L	GF	GA	GD	Pts
1	Motagua	232	83	74	75	263	252	+11	240
2	Real España	232	75	74	83	252	263	−11	224

== Trivia ==
- First game in Liga Nacional: Held on 5 September 1965 at San Pedro Sula, Motagua defeated España 0–2 with two goals from Elio Banegas.
- Motagua's largest home win: 7–1 in 2015–16.
- Real España's largest away win: 2–4 in 2007–08.
- First game at Tegucigalpa: Motagua 1–1 España in 1965–66.
- First Real España's home win: 2–0 in 1966–67.
- Motagua's largest away win: 0–4 in 1999–00.
- Real España's largest home win: 5–0 in 2014–15.
- Motagua's best goalscorer against Real España: Rubilio Castillo with 13 goals.
- Real España's best goalscorer against Motagua: Jimmy Bailey with 10 goals.
- Players that had score with both teams: Júnior Costly, Miguel Matthews, Gilberto Yearwood, Geovanny Ávila and Pedro Santana.
