= 1985 CONCACAF Championship qualification =

Regional association football event

Tournament details
- Dates: 15 June – 6 October 1984
- Teams: 17 (from 1 confederation)

Tournament statistics
- Matches played: 10
- Goals scored: 26 (2.6 per match)

The 1985 CONCACAF Championship qualification competition was the qualifying contest to decide the finalists for the 1985 CONCACAF Championship – the ninth international association football championship for members of the Confederation of North, Central America and Caribbean Association Football (CONCACAF). Qualifying ran from 15 June – 6 October 1984 and was contested by the national teams of 15 CONCACAF member associations. The competition doubled as the qualification competition for the 1986 FIFA World Cup.

Guatemala were given a bye to the final tournament and did not compete in the qualifying competition. Eight teams – El Salvador, United States, Honduras, Haiti, Suriname, Canada, Trinidad and Tobago and Costa Rica – qualified for the final tournament.

== Background ==
The Confederation of North, Central America and Caribbean Association Football (CONCACAF) was founded as a merger of the Confederación Centroamericana y del Caribe de Fútbol (CCCF) and North American Football Confederation (NAFC) in 1961. The first CONCACAF Championship, in which all the competing nations qualified automatically, was held in 1963. A qualifying competition was introduced from the second edition in 1965. From 1973, the competition doubled as the qualifying competition for the FIFA World Cup for teams in North, Central America and the Caribbean. Only the winner of each edition would qualify for the World Cup.

== Format ==
One of the 17 teams was drawn to receive a bye to the final tournament. The remaining 16 teams were drawn into eight two-legged ties. The team scoring more goals on aggregate in each tie would qualify for the final tournament.

=== Participants ===
- Antigua and Barbuda
- Barbados
- Canada
- Costa Rica
- El Salvador
- Grenada
- Guyana
- Haiti
- Honduras
- Jamaica
- Netherlands Antilles
- Panama
- Puerto Rico
- Suriname
- Trinidad and Tobago
- United States

== Summary ==
Guatemala received a bye to the final tournament. Jamaica, Grenada and Barbados withdrew after the draw was made and Canada, Trinidad and Tobago and Costa Rica were given walkovers to qualify for the final tournament.

The qualification competition began on 15 June when Honduras defeated Panama 3–0 in the first leg. Nine days later, Honduras won 1–0 against Panama in the second leg to qualify for the final tournament 4–0 on aggregate. On 29 July, El Salvador won 5–0 against Puerto Rico in the first leg. Six days later, Haiti defeated Antigua and Barbuda 4–0 in the first leg. The following day, El Salvador defeated Puerto Rico 3–0 in the second leg to qualify for the final tournament 8–0 on aggregate. On 7 August, Haiti qualified for the final tournament despite a 2–1 loss in the second leg against Antigua and Barbuda, winning 5–2 on aggregate. Eight days later, Suriname won 1–0 against Guyana in the first leg. On 29 August, Guyana and Suriname drew 1–1 in the second leg as Suriname qualified for the final tournament 2–1 on aggregate. The final tie began onw month later as the United States and the Netherlands Antilles played out a goalless first leg. In the final match of the qualification competition on 6 October, the United States won 4–0 to qualify for the final tournament 4–0 on aggregate.

Qualifying stage
Team 1	Agg.	Team 2	1st leg	2nd leg
Guatemala	Bye	n/a	—	—
El Salvador	8–0	Puerto Rico	5–0	3–0
Netherlands Antilles	0–4	United States	0–0	0–4
Panama	0–4	Honduras	0–3	0–1
Antigua and Barbuda	2–5	Haiti	0–4 (Note: Both matches played in Port-au-Prince, Haiti.)	2–1
Suriname	2–1	Guyana	1–0	1–1
Jamaica	w/o (Note: Jamaica withdrew and Canada received a walkover.)	Canada	—	—
Grenada	w/o (Note: Grenada withdrew and Trinidad and Tobago received a walkover.)	Trinidad and Tobago	—	—
Barbados	w/o (Note: Barbados withdrew and Costa Rica received a walkover.)	Costa Rica	—	—

=== Matches ===
29 July 1984

El Salvador	5–0	Puerto Rico
Hernández 6', 19'; Rivas 28'; Alfaro 45'; López Medrano 82'

Estadio Cuscatlán, San Salvador
Referee: Rómulo Méndez (Guatemala)
5 August 1984

Puerto Rico	0–3	El Salvador
		Zapata 1'; Rivas 12'; Perla 80'

Estadio Sixto Escobar, San Juan
Referee: Osborne (Bermuda)

El Salvador won 8–0 on aggregate.

29 September 1984

Netherlands Antilles	0–0	United States

Ergilio Hato Stadium, Willemstad, Netherlands Antilles
Referee: Goede (Suriname)
6 October 1984

United States	4–0	Netherlands Antilles
DiBernardo 50'; Coker 58', 67'; Kapp 85'

Busch Stadium, St. Louis
Referee: Fusco (Canada)

The United States won 4–0 on aggregate.

15 June 1984

Panama	0–3	Honduras
		Figueroa 50', 78'; Laing 71'

Estadio Armando Dely Valdés, Colón
Referee: Ortiz Cardoza (El Salvador)
24 June 1984

Honduras	1–0	Panama
Figueroa 67' (pen.)

Estadio Nacional Chelato Uclés, Tegucigalpa
Referee: Gus Constantine (United States)

Honduras won 4–0 on aggregate.

4 August 1984

Antigua and Barbuda	0–4	Haiti
		Auguste 20', 31', 87'; Thomas 51'

Stade Sylvio Cator, Port-au-Prince, Haiti (Note: Antigua and Barbuda played their home match in Port-au-Prince, Haiti.)
Referee: Taylor (Jamaica)
7 August 1984

Haiti	1–2	Antigua and Barbuda
Vorbe 33'		Gonzalves 17'; Roberts 56'

Stade Sylvio Cator, Port-au-Prince
Referee: Campbell (Jamaica)

Haiti won 5–2 on aggregate.

15 August 1984

Suriname	1–0	Guyana
Edwards 77'

André Kamperveen Stadion, Paramaribo
Referee: Lee (Netherlands Antilles)
29 August 1984

Guyana	1–1	Suriname
Archer 36'		Klinker 58'

Georgetown Cricket Club Ground, Georgetown
Referee: Sirjuesingh (Trinidad and Tobago)

Suriname won 2–1 on aggregate.

Jamaica	Cancelled	Canada

Canada	Cancelled	Jamaica

Grenada	Cancelled	Trinidad and Tobago

Trinidad and Tobago	Cancelled	Grenada

Barbados	Cancelled	Costa Rica

Costa Rica	Cancelled	Barbados

== Goalscorers ==
There were 26 goals scored in 10 matches, for an average of 2.6 goals per match.

3 goals

- (Haiti) Maxime Auguste
- (Honduras) José Roberto Figueroa

2 goals

- (El Salvador) Mauricio Alfaro
- (El Salvador) Ever Hernández
- (El Salvador) José María Rivas
- (United States) Ade Coker

1 goal

- (Antigua and Barbuda) Everton Gonzalves
- (Antigua and Barbuda) Elvis Roberts
- (El Salvador) Dagoberto Lopez Medrano
- (El Salvador) Luis Ramírez Zapata
- (Guyana) Terrence Archer
- (Haiti) Keslin Thomas
- (Haiti) Edward Vorbe
- (Honduras) Eduardo Laing
- (Suriname) Jacob Edwards
- (Suriname) Umberto Klinker
- (United States) Angelo DiBernardo
- (United States) Erhardt Kapp
