= Rigoberto Gómez =

Rigoberto Gómez may refer to:

- Rigoberto Gómez (footballer, born 1944), Honduran football forward
- Rigoberto Gómez (footballer, born 1977), Guatemalan football midfielder
