= 1977 Honduran Segunda División =

Honduran Segunda División
- Season: 1977–78
- Champions: Tiburones
- Promoted: Tiburones
- All statistics correct as of 22 December 1977.

The 1977 Honduran Segunda División was the eleventh season of the Honduran Segunda División. Under the management of Roy Almendárez, C.D. Tiburones won the tournament after defeating Alianza in the final series and obtained promotion to the 1978–79 Honduran Liga Nacional.

== Final ==
18 December 1977 1st leg	Tiburones	3–3	Alianza
	?'		(Pen.)

22 December 1977 2nd leg	Alianza	1–4	Tiburones	San Pedro Sula, Cortés
	Goal		Goal	Stadium: Estadio Francisco Morazán

- Tiburones won 8–3 on aggregate.
