= Mario Iubini =

Chilean footballer (born 1954)

Personal information
- Full name: Mario Hernán Iubini Carreño
- Date of birth: 14 January 1954 (age 72)
- Place of birth: Talcahuano, Chile
- Height: 1.77 m (5 ft 10 in)
- Position: Forward

Youth career
- Audax Italiano

Senior career*
Years	Team	Apps	(Gls)
1973–1974	Audax Italiano		
1974–1975	Aigle Noir		
1975	Atlético Marte		
1976–1977	Motagua		
1977	Comunicaciones		(3)
1978	Motagua		(10)
1978	Aurora FC		(3)
1979	CD Olimpia		
1979–1980	CD Santiagueño		
1981	Motagua		
1982	CD Olimpia		
1983–1984	Regional Atacama	33	(5)
1984	Audax Italiano	0	(0)
1985	New York Celtic		
1986	Cojutepeque		
- * Club domestic league appearances and goals

Mario Hernán Iubini Carreño (born 14 January 1954), frequently referred as Mario Yubini or sometimes Mario Carreño, is a Chilean former professional footballer who played as a forward for clubs in Chile, Central America and the United States.

== Career ==
Iubini played in his country of birth for Audax Italiano and Regional Atacama.

In El Salvador, he played for Atlético Marte, CD Santiagueño and Cojutepeque.

In Honduras, he played for Motagua and CD Olimpia.

In Guatemala, he played for Comunicaciones (1977) and Aurora FC (1978), scoring three goals for each club.

He won league titles with Comunicaciones and Aurora FC in Guatemala, CD Santiagueño in El Salvador and CD Olimpia in Honduras.

He also had stints with Aigle Noir in Haití and New York Celtic in the United States.

== Honours ==
Comunicaciones

- Liga Nacional de Fútbol de Guatemala: 1977–78

Aurora FC

- Liga Nacional de Fútbol de Guatemala: 1978

CD Santiagueño

- Salvadoran Primera División: 1979–80

Olimpia

- Honduran Liga Nacional: 1982–83

Individual

- Honduran Liga Nacional Top Goalscorer: 1977–78
