= C.D. Tiburones =

Honduran football club

- Full name: Club Deportivo Tiburones
- Ground: Estadio Angel Augusto Martinez, San Lorenzo, Valle, Honduras
- Capacity: 3,000
- League: Liga de Ascenso
Home colours

C.D. Tiburones is a Honduran football club. It is based on San Lorenzo, Valle, Honduras. They played in the Honduran first division in the 1978–79 season.

== League performance ==
Regular season											Postseason								
Season	Pos.	Pld	W	D	L	F	A	GD	Pts	PD	Pos.	Pld	W	D	L	F	A	GD	Pts
1978–79	10th	27	4	10	13	20	34	–14	18	—	Didn't enter								

== Achievements ==
- Segunda División

Winners (1): 1977
