= Rubén Rodríguez-Peña =

Chilean footballer

Personal information
- Full name: Rubén Eduardo Rodríguez-Peña Llantén
- Place of birth: Santiago, Chile
- Position: Forward

Senior career*
| Years | Team | Apps | (Gls) |
| 1966–1967 | Magallanes | 12 | (0) |
| 1968–1970 | Green Cross Temuco | 64 | (13) |
| 1971 | Huachipato | 15 | (2) |
| 1972 | Deportes La Serena | 21 | (5) |
| 1973 | Herediano | | |
| 1974–1975 | Platense FC | 48 | (21) |
| 1975–1977 | Real España | 30 | (6) |
| 1978 | Platense FC | 2 | (0) |
| | 2 de Marzo | – | (–) |
- * Club domestic league appearances and goals

Rubén Eduardo Rodríguez-Peña Llantén is a Chilean former footballer who played as a forward. Besides Chile, he played in Costa Rica, Honduras and Ecuador.

== Career ==
In his homeland, Rodríguez-Peña played for Magallanes, Green Cross Temuco, Huachipato and Deportes La Serena in the top division from 1966 to 1972.

In 1973, he moved abroad and played for Costa Rican side Herediano.

From 1974 to 1978, he played in the Honduran top level for Platense in two stints and Real España. A well remembered player of Platense, he made forty-eight appearances and scored twenty-one goals from 1974 to 1975 and holds the record of scoring in eight consecutive matchdays in 1974, becoming the top goalscorer in the 1974–75 season with fifteen goals. He returned to Platense in 1978, making two appearances, after playing for Real España from 1975 to 1977, with thirty appearances and six goals, with whom he won three consecutive league titles. He also played for Ecuadorian side Club Deportivo 2 de Marzo alongside his brother, Waldo.

== Honours ==
=== Club ===
Real España

- Liga Nacional de Fútbol Profesional (3): 1974–75, 1975–76, 1976–77

=== Individual ===
- Liga Nacional de Fútbol Profesional Top Goalscorer: 1974–75
