= Jaime Villegas =

Honduran footballer (born 1950)

Personal information
- Full name: Jaime Enrique Villegas Roura
- Date of birth: 5 July 1950 (age 76)
- Place of birth: La Ceiba, Honduras
- Position: Defender

Senior career*
Years	Team	Apps	(Gls)
1968–1986	Real España	309	(2)

International career
1973–1985	Honduras	32	(0)
- * Club domestic league appearances and goals

Jaime Enrique Villegas Roura (born 5 July 1950) is a Honduran football defender who played for Honduras in the 1982 FIFA World Cup.

== Club career ==
He also played for Real España. He played a then record 309 matches in the Honduran National League

== International career ==
Villegas played several years for Honduras and has earned over 30 caps. He has represented his country in 25 FIFA World Cup qualification matches and played at the 1982 FIFA World Cup.

== Club President ==
In May 2010, Villegas confirmed he would be Real España's new president and later became sporting director.

== Honours and awards ==
=== Club ===
C.D. Real Espana

- Liga Profesional de Honduras (4): 1974–75, 1975–76, 1976–77, 1980–81
- Honduran Cup (1): 1972,
- Copa Interclubes UNCAF (1): 1982
