= Julio Tapia =

Chilean footballer

Personal information
- Full name: Julio del Carmen Tapia Callao
- Date of birth: 27 September 1952 (age 74)
- Place of birth: Nogales, Chile
- Height: 1.68 m (5 ft 6 in)
- Position: Forward

Youth career
- Everton

Senior career*
Years	Team	Apps	(Gls)
1971	Everton	1	(0)
1973–1974	Unión La Calera	26	(8)
1975	Regional Antofagasta	17	(3)
1976–1981	Real España	69	(17)
1981–1982	Atlético Morazán	22	(6)
1982–1983	Marathón	12	(2)
1983	Atlético Independiente		
- * Club domestic league appearances and goals

Julio del Carmen Tapia Callao (born 27 September 1952) is a Chilean former footballer who played for clubs in Chile and Honduras.

== Career ==
Born in Nogales, Chile, Tapia is a product of Everton de Viña del Mar youth system and made one appearance in the 1971 season for them before joining military service for a year. Then, he returned to play football for Unión La Calera and Regional Antofagasta in his homeland. As a member of Unión La Calera, he scored a goal in the first win in the history of the club against Colo-Colo on 24 January 1974.

In 1976, he moved to Honduras alongside his fellow Andrés Soto Araya thanks to the coach Carlos Padilla and joined Real España, with whom he spent five seasons until 1981, becoming a historical player of the club. In addition to Soto Araya, he also coincided with his compatriot Rubén Rodríguez-Peña when the club became three-times champion in the 1976–77 season. He also scored a goal in the historical hammering by 5–0 against Pumas UNAH on 30 October 1977. He won a second league title in the 1980–81 season.

In Honduras, he also played for Atlético Morazán, Marathón and Atlético Independiente, his last club in 1983.

== Personal life ==
Despite his short stature, he was nicknamed Camión (Truck) due to his strength, an alias that was given him when he was a player of Unión La Calera.

He made his home in El Higuero village from Choloma and owns a balcony factory.

His parents were Emilia Callao and Julio del Tránsito Tapia. Along wis wife, Ana Margarita Pacheco, he has four children.
