= Rigoberto Gómez (footballer, born 1977) =

Footballer

Personal information
- Full name: Rigoberto Gómez Laínez
- Date of birth: January 9, 1977 (age 49)
- Place of birth: Tegucigalpa, Honduras
- Height: 1.70 m (5 ft 7 in)
- Position: Midfielder

Senior career*
Years	Team	Apps	(Gls)
1996–2014	Comunicaciones	92	(1)

International career^{‡}
1998–	Guatemala	15	(1)
- * Club domestic league appearances and goals as of 20 March 2007 ‡ National team caps and goals as of 12 June 2007

Rigoberto Gómez Laínez (born January 9, 1977), nicknamed La Chula, is a Honduran-Guatemalan former professional footballer who played as a midfielder. Born in Honduras, he represented the Guatemala national team.

== Club career ==
The rather short Gómez started playing for Comunicaciones in 1996 and has not featured for any other team since, making him one of their most loyal and experienced players As of June 2014, Gómez signed for another season for Comunicaciones.

== International career ==
Although born in neighbouring Honduras, Gómez made his debut for Guatemala at the November 1998 Hurricane Relief Tournament in Los Angeles against Honduras and has, as of January 2010, earned a total of 15 caps, scoring 1 goal. He has represented his country in 2 FIFA World Cup qualification matches and at the 2000, 2005 and 2007 CONCACAF Gold Cup Finals.

=== International goals ===
Scores and results list. Guatemala's goal tally first.

#	Date	Venue	Opponent	Score	Result	Competition
1	17 October 2007	Los Angeles Memorial Coliseum, Los Angeles, United States	Mexico	1-0	3-2	Friendly match
