= Francisco Javier Toledo =

Honduran footballer (1959-2006)

Personal information
- Full name: Francisco Javier Toledo Rivera
- Date of birth: 30 September 1959
- Place of birth: Honduras
- Date of death: 3 August 2006 (aged 46)
- Place of death: San Pedro Sula, Honduras
- Position: Midfielder

Senior career*
Years	Team	Apps	(Gls)
1978–1984	Marathón	193	(7)
1985	Tela Timsa	22	(1)
1986–1988	Marathón	62	(3)
1988–1989	Olimpia	24	(1)
Total		301	(12)

International career
1979–1987	Honduras	34	(0)
- * Club domestic league appearances and goals

Francisco Javier Toledo Rivera (30 September 1959 – 3 August 2006) was a Honduran football midfielder.

== Club career ==
Toledo played for Marathón, Tela Timsa and Olimpia.

== International career ==
Toledo represented his country in 18 FIFA World Cup qualification matches and was a non-playing squad member of Honduras' 1982 FIFA World Cup squad.

== Death ==
Toledo died, aged only 46, in the Mario Catarino Rivas Hospital in San Pedro Sula after suffering a long illness. He was the second player of Honduras' 1982 World Cup squad to have died, after Domingo Drummond.
