= Domingo Drummond =

Honduran footballer (1957-2002)

Personal information
- Full name: José Domingo Drummond Cooper
- Date of birth: 14 April 1957
- Place of birth: Puerto Cortés, Honduras
- Date of death: 23 January 2002 (aged 44)
- Position: Defender

Senior career*
Years	Team	Apps	(Gls)
1977–1993	Platense	235	(11)

International career
1978–1985	Honduras	34	(1)
- * Club domestic league appearances and goals

José Domingo Drummond Cooper (14 April 1957 – 23 January 2002) was a Honduran footballer who participated at the 1982 FIFA World Cup.

== Club career ==
Born in Puerto Cortés, Drummond played his entire career for local side Platense in the Honduran National League, as a defender.

== International career ==
Drummond also played for the Catrachos and represented his country in 14 FIFA World Cup qualification matches and played in one game at the 1982 FIFA World Cup.

== Death ==
He died at the age of 44.
