= Salvador Bernárdez =

Honduran footballer (1954-2011)

Personal information
- Full name: Salvador Blanco Bernárdez
- Date of birth: 6 January 1954
- Place of birth: La Ceiba, Honduras
- Date of death: 18 July 2011 (aged 57)
- Place of death: San Francisco, California, USA
- Position: Midfielder

Senior career*
Years	Team	Apps	(Gls)
1974–1981	Motagua	138	(36)

International career
	Honduras	14	(5)
Medal record
Representing Motagua
Silver medal – second place	Liga Nacional	1974–75
Bronze medal – third place	Liga Nacional	1975–76
Silver medal – second place	Liga Nacional	1976–77
Bronze medal – third place	Liga Nacional	1977–78
Gold medal – first place	Liga Nacional	1978–79
- * Club domestic league appearances and goals as of 19 May 2011

Salvador Bernárdez (6 January 1954 – 18 July 2011) was a Honduran international football midfielder.

== Club career ==
Nicknamed Pichini and Pólvora, Bernárdez played his entire career for F.C. Motagua in the Honduran league. He was the Honduran league's top goalscorer in the 1978/79 season and still is the 9th best scorer for Motagua of all time with 36 goals.

== International career ==
Bernárdez has represented Honduras in 9 1982 FIFA World Cup qualification matches, helping them to qualify for their first World Cup Finals tournament. He did however not make the final squad for Spain 1982 due to injury. He went on to earn 14 caps, scoring 5 goals.

=== International goals ===
Scores and results list Honduras' goal tally first.

N.	Date	Venue	Opponent	Score	Result	Competition
1.	30 July 1980	Estadio de la Revolución, Panama City, Panama	Panama	1–0	2–0	1982 FIFA World Cup qualification
2.	1 October 1980	Estadio Ricardo Saprissa, San José, Costa Rica	Costa Rica	2–0	3–2	1982 FIFA World Cup qualification
3.	14 December 1980	Estadio Tiburcio Carías Andino, Tegucigalpa, Honduras	Panama	1–0	5–0	1982 FIFA World Cup qualification
4.	14 December 1980	Estadio Tiburcio Carías Andino, Tegucigalpa, Honduras	Panama	2–0	5–0	1982 FIFA World Cup qualification
5.	14 December 1980	Estadio Tiburcio Carías Andino, Tegucigalpa, Honduras	Panama	4–0	5–0	1982 FIFA World Cup qualification

== Retirement ==
He coached Barcelona a U-15 Boys competitive team for one season. He moved to the United States in the 1980s.

== Personal life and death ==
Bernárdez' father Víctor also played for Motagua in the 1940s and 1950s. Salvador was married to Julia Maritza Gracia.

He died at the age of 58 in San Francisco, California from a heart attack.

== Honours ==
Motagua

1978–79

Individual

Top goalscorer with Motagua in 1978–79
