= Allan Anthony Costly =

Honduran footballer (born 1954)

Personal information
- Full name: Allan Anthony Costly Blyden
- Date of birth: 13 December 1954 (age 71)
- Place of birth: Tela, Honduras
- Position: Defender

Senior career*
Years	Team	Apps	(Gls)
1974–1977	Tela Timsa		
1977–1982	Real España		
1982–1983	Málaga	6	(0)
1983–1986	Petrotela		
1987–1991	Real España		

International career
1977-1988	Honduras	41	(3)
- * Club domestic league appearances and goals

Allan Anthony Costly Blyden (born 13 December 1954) is a Honduran former footballer who played at both professional and international levels, as a defender.

== Career ==
Born in Tela, Costly played club football in Honduras Tela Timsa, Real España and Petrotela. He also had a spell in Spain with CD Málaga.

== International career ==
Nicknamed Cochero ("The Coachman"), Costly played at the 1977 FIFA World Youth Championship, and represented his country in 18 FIFA World Cup qualification matches and played at the 1982 FIFA World Cup. He earned a total of 41 caps, scoring 3 goals.

=== International goals ===
Scores and results list Honduras' goal tally first.

N.	Date	Venue	Opponent	Score	Result	Competition
1.	30 July 1980	Estadío de la Revolución, Panama City, Panama	Panama	2–0	2-0	1982 FIFA World Cup qualification
2.	8 November 1981	Estadio Tiburcio Carías Andino, Tegucigalpa, Honduras	Cuba	2–0	2-0	1982 FIFA World Cup qualification

== Personal life ==
His son is Honduran international striker Carlo Costly.
