= Estadio Fausto Flores Lagos =

Coordinates: 13.291612°N 87.193390°W

Fausto Flores Lagos
- Interactive map of Fausto Flores Lagos
- Full name: Estadio Fausto Flores Lagos
- Location: Choluteca, Honduras
- Owner: Choluteca Municipality
- Capacity: 5,500
- Surface: grass

Tenant
- C.D. Broncos (1972–2001)

Estadio Fausto Flores Lagos is a multi-use stadium in Choluteca, Choluteca, Honduras. It is currently used mostly for football matches and it was the home stadium for C.D. Broncos until 2001. The stadium holds 5,500 people.
