= Eduardo Laing =

Honduran footballer (born 1958)

Eduardo Tony Laing
Personal information
- Full name: Eduardo Antonio Laing Cárcamo
- Date of birth: 27 December 1958
- Place of birth: Puerto Cortes, Honduras
- Height: 1.76 m (5 ft 9 1/2 in)
- Position: Forward

Youth career
- –1977: El Flamingo

Senior career*
Years	Team	Apps	(Gls)
1977–1986	Platense		(39)
1982–1983	Ethnikos Piraeus		
1987–1989	Marathón		
1989–1993	Platense		(6)
1993–1994	Deportes Progreseño		
1994–1997	Platense		

International career
1981–1989	Honduras	34	(8)
- * Club domestic league appearances and goals

Eduardo Antonio "Tony" Laing Cárcamo (born 27 December 1958) is a retired Honduran football player and member of the Honduras national football team, known for his game-tying goal against Northern Ireland in the 1982 FIFA World Cup.

== Club career ==
Nicknamed Aguja (the Needle), Laing started playing professional football in Honduras at age 17, and is the fourth all-time leading scorer for Platense with 45 goals. He also played for Marathón, as well as in Greece with Ethnikos before retiring as a player in 1997.

== International career ==
In 1982, Laing was selected for the Honduras World Cup team as a reserve. He entered as a substitute in the 58th minute of Honduras's second game, against Northern Ireland, and scored the game-tying goal in the 60th minute with a header from a corner kick. He represented his country in 7 FIFA World Cup qualification matches and also appeared in the 1985 CONCACAF Championship, scoring two goals for Honduras in qualifying play. In total, Laing earned a total of 34 caps, scoring 8 goals.

== Retirement ==
In 2007, Laing moved to New Orleans, Louisiana, where he coaches amateur soccer and works as a painting contractor.

== Personal life ==
He is married to Nidia Zaldivar and the couple have three children: Bessy Lizeth, Edward Anthony, and Anthony Jeerod. He also has 6 grandchildren ― Frances Sabrinah, Francheska Antonellah, Edwin Elijah, Aubrey Paulette, Jaylah Camille and Jaylen Nathaniel — and 1 great granddaughter — Klarity Blu.
