= Porfirio Armando Betancourt =

Honduran footballer (1957–2021)

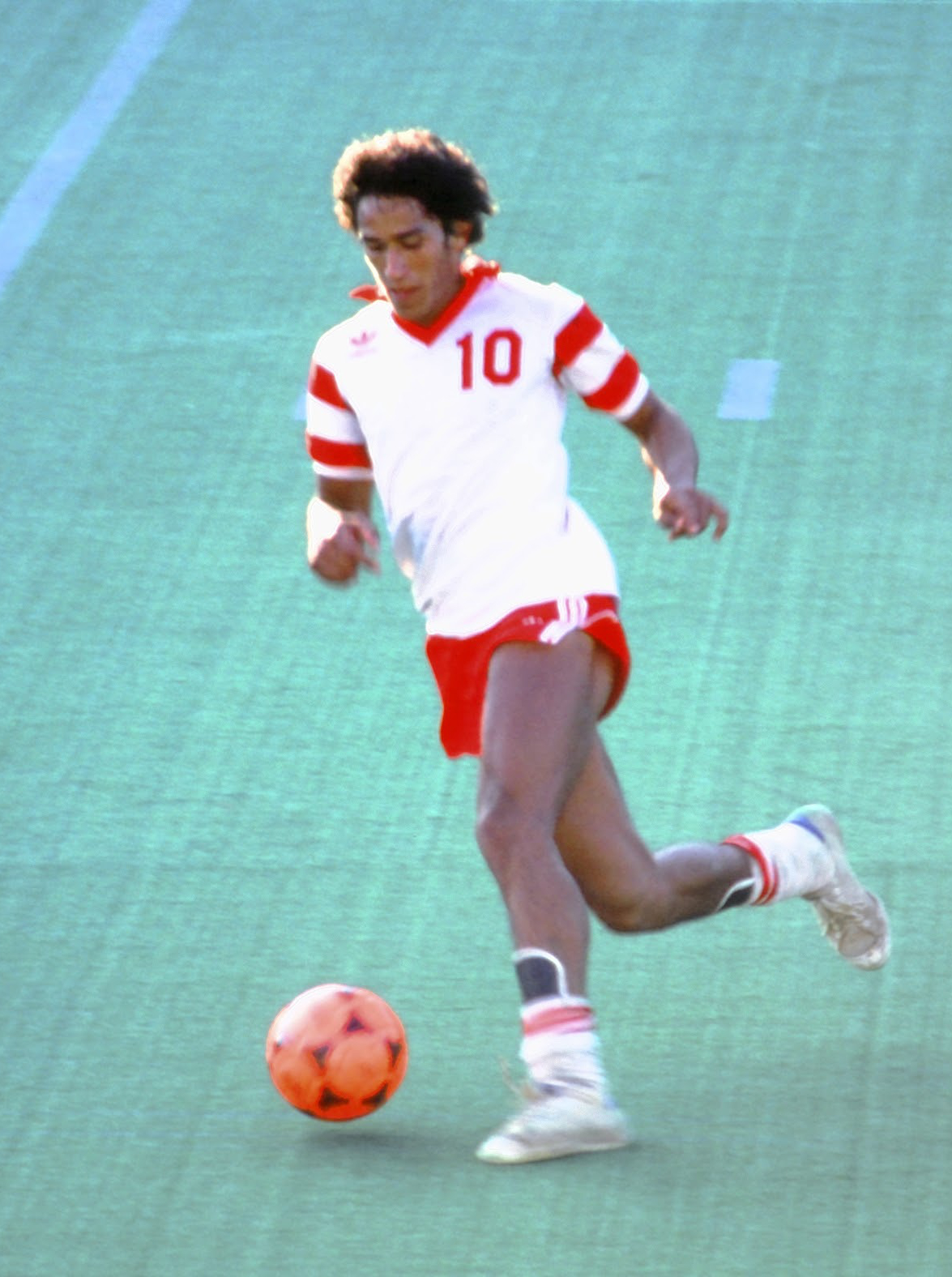
- Betancourt in 1981

Personal information
- Full name: Porfirio Armando Betancourt Carranza
- Date of birth: 10 October 1957
- Place of birth: Lima, Honduras
- Date of death: 28 July 2021 (aged 63)
- Place of death: San Pedro Sula, Honduras
- Height: 1.93 m (6 ft 4 in)
- Position: Striker

Youth career
- 1976: Honduran Brewery

College career
Years	Team	Apps	(Gls)
1979–1981	Indiana University		

Senior career*
Years	Team	Apps	(Gls)
1977–1978	Marathón		
1981–1982	Real España		
1982–1984	Strasbourg	38	(5)
1984–1985	St. Louis Steamers (indoor)	42	(16)
1985–1986	Logroñes		
1987–1988	Kansas City Comets (indoor)	48	(5)
1988	Marathón		

International career
1982–1985	Honduras	9	(5)
- * Club domestic league appearances and goals

Porfirio Armando Betancourt Carranza (10 October 1957 – 28 July 2021) was a Honduran professional footballer.

== Youth ==
Born in Lima, Honduras, Betancourt grew up in a soccer family. His father, Porfirio Betancourt played for Club Deportivo Olimpia and his two uncles played for Club Deportivo Platense. As a youth player, he played for the Honduran Brewery club beginning in 1976. Betancourt graduated from Escuela Internacional Sampedrana. In 1979, he entered Indiana University, in the United States, where he would play men's college soccer for three seasons (see photo). He scored 20 goals and assisted on 12 more his first year, earning first team All American honours. That season, the Hoosiers went to the quarterfinals of the NCAA tournament.

Betancourt joined the Honduran Olympic team for the 1980 Summer Olympics qualification tournament. When Honduras joined the US-led boycott of the games, Betancourt returned to Indiana.

For the 1980 collegiate season, Betancourt saw a drop off in his scoring, bagging 17 goals and assisting on 16 others. However, this was good enough to earn him second team All American honours. While Betancourt saw a personal slump, his team made it to the NCAA championship game where it lost to the powerhouse University of San Francisco team. His third season with Indiana showed Betancourt at the top of his game. He scored 27 goals, assisted on 9 more. He was showered with accolades, earning first team All America, and winning the Hermann Trophy as the best collegiate player that year. While Betancourt left Indiana University after his junior year to play for Honduras in the 1982 FIFA World Cup, he is still considered one of the greatest collegiate players ever.

Soccer America Magazine named him the Player of the Decade (1980s) and placed him on its College Team of the Century. In 1992, Indiana University inducted Betancourt into its Hall of Fame.

== Professional ==
On 27 October 1981, the St. Louis Steamers of Major Indoor Soccer League (MISL) selected Betancourt in the first round (12th overall) in the college draft. Betancourt declined to sign with the Steamers and instead returned to Honduras to make himself eligible for the Honduras national team, then beginning qualification for the 1982 FIFA World Cup. When he returned to Honduras, he joined Real CD España. While Betancourt failed to play any of the Honduran qualification games, national team manager José de la Paz Herrera called up Betancourt to replace the injured Jimmy James Bailey. Betancourt would go on to play every minute of Honduras’ three games (0–2–1 record) during the cup.

After the World Cup, Betancourt moved to France to pursue a professional career with Racing Club Strasbourg, which played in the French First Division at the time. He joined Strasbourg in June 1982 and remained with the team until June 1984. During his time with Strasbourg, he played 38 league games, scoring five goals. He played another seven cup games, but scored no goals in them.

Betancourt returned to the US and signed with the St. Louis Steamers of Major Indoor Soccer League (MISL) for the 1984–85 season. In 1985, he was on the roster of Spanish club CD Logroñés, then playing in the Spanish Primera División.

In 1985, Betancourt was called up to the Honduras national football team for its qualification campaign for the 1986 FIFA World Cup. While Betancourt scored three times, Honduras failed to make the cup finals. Betancourt returned to the US and played with the Kansas City Comets of MISL during the 1987–88 pre-season.

He then returned to Honduras where he played for Marathón in 1988. He then moved to Florida where he lived for several years before returning to Honduras to enter politics.

== International career ==
Betancourt was called up by Honduras national team coach Rodolfo Godoy to play for Honduras U-20 team for the qualification tournament for the 1977 FIFA Youth Cup. Betancourt scored 11 goals while leading Honduras to an undefeated record and a berth in the Cup. Honduras went 2–1 in group play, but failed to qualify for the second round.

He made his debut for the Honduras seniors in an April 1982 friendly match against El Salvador and has earned a total of nine caps, scoring five goals. He has represented his country in four FIFA World Cup qualification matches and played all three matches at the 1982 FIFA World Cup.

His final international was a September 1985 World Cup qualification match against Canada.

== Death ==
Betancourt died of COVID-19 on 28 July 2021, in San Pedro Sula, Honduras.

== International goals ==
Scores and results list Honduras' goal tally first, score column indicates score after each Betancourt goal.

List of international goals scored by Porfirio Armando Betancourt
No.	Date	Venue	Opponent	Score	Result	Competition
1	18 April 1982		El Salvador	3–0	2–3	Friendly match
2	22 April 1982		El Salvador	1–0	1–1	Friendly match
3	11 August 1985	Estadio Ricardo Saprissa, Costa Rica, Costa Rica	Costa Rica	2–1	2–2	1986 FIFA World Cup qualification
4	8 September 1985	Estadio Tiburcio Carías Andino, Tegucigalpa, Honduras	Costa Rica	1–1	3–1	1986 FIFA World Cup qualification
5	14 September 1985	, St. John's, Canada	Canada	1–1	1–2	1986 FIFA World Cup qualification
