= Roberto Bailey =

Honduran footballer (1952–2019)

Personal information
- Full name: Roberto James Bailey Sargent
- Date of birth: 10 August 1952
- Place of birth: Honduras
- Date of death: 11 June 2019 (aged 66)
- Positions: Striker; second striker

Senior career*
Years	Team	Apps	(Gls)
1970–1977	Victoria	??	(26)
1978–1984	Marathón	161	(47)

International career
1980–1985	Honduras	9	(1)
- * Club domestic league appearances and goals

Roberto James Bailey Sargent (10 August 1952 – 11 June 2019) was a Honduran football forward who played for Honduras in the 1982 FIFA World Cup.

== Club career ==
Nicknamed El Robot, Bailey played for C.D. Marathón for whom he scored 47 goals. He and his brother Jimmy James Bailey share a record with the Palacios brothers, the sole families to have scored in more than one League final.

== Career statistics ==
=== Club ===
As of match played 122 August 2014

Club	Season	League			Honduran Cup		League Cup		CONCACAF		Total	
Club	Season	Division	Apps	Goals	Apps	Goals	Apps	Goals	Apps	Goals	Apps	Goals
Marathón	1978–79	Honduran Liga Nacional	22	7	—		—		—			
Marathón	1979–80	Honduran Liga Nacional	33	12	—		—		—			
Marathón	1980–81	Honduran Liga Nacional	33	10	—		—		—			
Marathón	1981–82	Honduran Liga Nacional	31	10	—		—		—			
Marathón	1982–83	Honduran Liga Nacional	22	4	—		—		—			
Marathón	1983–84	Honduran Liga Nacional	20	4	—		—		—			
Marathón	Total		161	47	0	0	0	0	0	0	161	47
Career total			161	47	0	0	0	0	0	0	161	47

== Personal life ==
Bailey lived in San Pedro Sula and worked for a spare-parts agency. He died in a car accident on June 11, 2019.
