= Jimmy Bailey =

Honduran footballer (born 1954)

Personal information
- Full name: Jimmy James Bailey Hinds
- Date of birth: 7 February 1954 (age 72)
- Place of birth: Tela, Honduras
- Position: Forward

Senior career*
| Years | Team | Apps | (Gls) |
| 1973–1985 | Real España | 191 | (52) |

International career
| 1979–1984 | Honduras | 25 | (11) |
- * Club domestic league appearances and goals

Jimmy James Bailey Hinds (born 7 February 1954) is a former Honduran football forward who played for Honduras during the 1981 CONCACAF Championship qualification.

== Club career ==
Nicknamed El Socio, Bailey played for Real España for whom he scored 52 goals in 191 caps between 1973 and 1985. He and his brother Roberto Bailey share a record with the Palacios brothers, the sole families to have scored in more than one League final.

== Personal life ==
Jimmy James Bailey lives in San Pedro Sula.
