= Roger Mayorga =

Nicaraguan footballer (1946–2019)

Personal information
- Full name: Roger Mayorga
- Date of birth: 10 July 1946
- Place of birth: Managua, Nicaragua
- Date of death: 5 October 2019 (aged 73)
- Place of death: Managua, Nicaragua
- Position: Goalkeeper

Youth career
- Escuela José Martí

Senior career*
Years	Team	Apps	(Gls)
1961	Club Dinamo		
- Rincón Español
- Milca Roja
1967	Flor de Caña		
1967	América Cali		
1967–1968	Aurora		
1969	Águila		
1971–1979	Motagua	123	(0)
1979–1980	Universidad	48	(0)
1981	Marathón	27	(0)
1982–1984	Súper Estrella		

International career
- Nicaragua
- * Club domestic league appearances and goals

Roger Mayorga (10 July 1946 – 5 October 2019) was a Nicaraguan football goalkeeper.

== Club career ==
Regarded as the finest of Nicaraguan goalkeepers alongside Salvador Dubois, Mayorga played his club football for Club Dinamo, Rincon Espanol, Milca Roja and Flor de Caña FC in his homeland Nicaragua and spent time abroad playing for América de Cali in Colombia, Águila in El Salvador and Aurora in Guatemala.

=== Honduras ===
He had a lengthy spell with F.C. Motagua, for whom he would play 123 games, and played for Universidad, Marathón and Super Estrella de Danlí in Honduras. He retired aged 38.

He holds the record of most successive clean sheets in the Honduran league, 10 matches without a goal conceded between 22 February 1976 and 9 May 1976.

== Record ==
Mayorga maintains a record of 838 minutes without conceiving a goal playing for F.C. Motagua in 1976.

== Personal life ==
His parents were Bienvenida Mayorga and Julio Gutiérrez. He lived with his family in Arizona, with family in NY. He died on 5 October 2019 in Managua at the age of 73 due to a heart attack.
