= Héctor Zelaya =

Honduran footballer (born 1958)

Personal information
- Full name: Héctor Ramón Zelaya Rivera
- Date of birth: 12 August 1958 (age 68)
- Place of birth: Trinidad, Honduras
- Height: 1.73 m (5 ft 8 in)
- Position: Defender

Senior career*
Years	Team	Apps	(Gls)
1976–1982	Motagua		
1982–1983	Deportivo La Coruña		
1983	Motagua		

International career
- Honduras U20
1980–1982	Honduras	17	(1)
- * Club domestic league appearances and goals

Héctor Ramón Zelaya Rivera (born 12 August 1958) is a retired Honduran football player.

== Club career ==
Nicknamed Pecho de Águila (Eagle chest), he started as a forward but later played in defense or midfield for F.C. Motagua. He made his professional debut in the Honduran Liga Nacional on 7 March 1976 wearing the Motagua jersey in the 1–0 win against Campamento.

Not to be confused with former Motagua teammate Héctor "Lin" Zelaya, Zelaya also played for Spanish Segunda División side Deportivo de La Coruña but an injury to his left knee prevented him from making an impact and he had to retire in 1983. He played his final game for Motagua against Universidad, aged only 24.

== International career ==
Zelaya played three games for the Honduras U-20s at the 1977 FIFA U-20 World Cup in Tunisia.

He then played in 7 World Cup qualifying matches in 1980 and 1981, taking Honduras to their first ever World Cup. He made history by scoring his country's first ever goal at a World Cup Finals Tournament, when he scored against hosts Spain at the 1982 FIFA World Cup. He put Honduras 1–0 up in Valencia before Spain scored the equalizer.

== Retirement ==
After his playing career came to a premature end, he worked 25 years in the coffee business of his wife's family. Also, he has been working for a children's football programme in Honduras called Fútbol para la vida.

== Personal life ==
Zelaya is married to journalist Marlen Perdomo and they have 4 children: Héctor, Iving, Alejandra and Marlen.

== Honours and awards ==
=== Club ===
C.D. Motagua

- Liga Profesional de Honduras (1): 1978–79
