= Julio César Arzú =

Honduran footballer (born 1954)

Personal information
- Full name: Julio César Arzú
- Date of birth: 5 June 1954 (age 72)
- Place of birth: Tela, Honduras
- Height: 1.80 m (5 ft 11 in)
- Position: Goalkeeper

Senior career*
| Years | Team | Apps | (Gls) |
| 1974–1982 | Real España | | |
| 1982–1983 | Racing de Santander | 10 | (0) |
| 1983 | ADET | | |
| 1984–1985 | Tela Timsa | | |
| 1990 | Olimpia | | |

International career^{‡}
| 1981-1985 | Honduras | 29 | (0) |
- * Club domestic league appearances and goals ‡ National team caps and goals as of 23 September 2026

Julio César Arzú (born 5 June 1954) a.k.a. Tile is a retired Honduran football player.

== Club career ==
Nicknamed Tile, Arzú has played for Honduran side Real España, in Spain for Racing de Santander and had a spell with ADET in El Salvador. With España he once kept successive clean sheets totalling 686 minutes.

== International career ==
Arzú has represented Honduras at the 1977 FIFA World Youth Championship. He played for the senior squad in 13 FIFA World Cup qualification matches and was their starting goalkeeper at the 1982 FIFA World Cup Finals in Spain.

== Personal life ==
Arzú currently trains the female junior varsity team at Escuela Internacional Sampedrana. He was briefly the Goalkeeping Coach for the national team in the 2006 World Cup Qualification.
