= Ramón Maradiaga =

Honduran footballer (born 1954)

Personal information
- Full name: Ramón Enrique Maradiaga Chávez
- Date of birth: 30 October 1954 (age 72)
- Place of birth: Amapala, Honduras
- Height: 1.65 m (5 ft 5 in)
- Position: Midfielder

Senior career*
Years	Team	Apps	(Gls)
1975–1982	Motagua		
1983	Águila		
1984	Tenerife	15	(1)
1985	Alianza		
1985–1986	Independiente		
1986–1990	Águila		
1989–1990	Motagua		
1990–1991	Real España		
1991–1992	Tela Timsa		

International career
1973–1985	Honduras	47	(1)

Managerial career
- 1992–1993: Petrotela
- 1993–1998: Motagua
- 1993: Marathón
- 1996–2002: Honduras
- 2002–2003: Motagua
- 2003: Águila
- 2004: Victoria
- 2004–2005: Guatemala
- 2006–2007: Motagua
- 2008: Guatemala
- 2009: Real España
- 2009–2011: Motagua
- 2012: Marathón
- 2012–2013: Municipal
- 2014–2015: Vida
- 2015–2016: El Salvador
- 2017: Real España
- 2018: Juticalpa
- 2022-2023: Achuapa
- 2023: Real Sociedad
- * Club domestic league appearances and goals

Ramón Enrique Maradiaga Chávez (nicknamed “the Primitive”, or “the Caveman”) was born October 30th 1954 in Amapala, Honduras is a retired Honduran football player and manager.

== Club career ==
Maradiaga played as a midfielder amongst others for F.C. Motagua as well as Salvadoran giants Águila and Alianza. He also had half a season in Europe, playing 15 games in the Spanish Segunda División for Tenerife in 1984. He scored 23 goals in total for Motagua, making him one of the most prolific midfielders in the club's history.

He finished his career at Tela Timsa after the 1991–1992 season and took the reins at the club the next season, also changing their name to Petrotela.

== International career ==
A stocky defensive midfielder, Maradiaga represented Honduras at the 1977 FIFA World Youth Championship. He went on to play for his country in 24 FIFA World Cup qualification matches and he was captain of the Honduras squad that took part in the 1982 FIFA World Cup.

== Managerial career ==
After his playing career ended, he has been rather successful as a coach. He has coached Motagua, Victoria, Águila and the Honduras national football team.

=== Guatemala national team ===
He had been in charge of the Guatemala national football team until 2006, but his contract was terminated after they failed to reach the 2006 FIFA World Cup qualification play-offs. He returned however for the 2010 FIFA World Cup qualification in March 2008 but was dismissed by the Chapines for a second time in October 2008.

He resigned in October 2009 as coach of Real España and in September 2011, he was dismissed as coach of Motagua, with whom he won four league titles. He was revealed as the new Marathón coach in January 2012 but was replaced by Manuel Keosseián in August 2012.

In September 2012, Maradiaga was presented as the new manager of Guatemalan giants Municipal.

=== El Salvador national team ===
In September 2015 he accepted the position of coach of the El Salvador national football team. On 6 September 2016, his team revealed that they had all been approached, and had turned down, an offer to ensure that their result against Canada saw Honduras progress to the next round for the 2018 FIFA World Cup qualification, but Maradiaga was later fined 20,000 Swiss francs and banned from football for two years for not disclosing the approach.

=== International recognition ===
On 7 January 2011 the International Federation of Football History & Statistics published a list of the World's Best Coach of the 1st Decade (2001–2010) and Maradiaga appeared on the list ranking 167th.

== Personal life ==
Primi is married to Lesby Vargas, who is 19 years younger than him. They have two sons, Martín and Javier.

== Honours and awards ==
=== Club ===
C.D. Motagua

- Liga Profesional de Honduras (1): 1978–79

C.D. Real Espana

- Liga Profesional de Honduras (1): 1990–91

=== Manager ===
==== International ====
Honduras

- Copa América: 3rd Place 2001
