= José Figueroa (footballer) =

Honduran footballer (1959–2020)

Roberto Figueroa
Personal information
- Full name: José Roberto Figueroa Padilla
- Date of birth: 14 November 1959
- Place of birth: Olanchito, Honduras
- Date of death: 24 May 2020 (aged 60)
- Place of death: San Francisco, United States
- Height: 1.77 m (5 ft 9 1/2 in)
- Position: Forward

Senior career*
Years	Team	Apps	(Gls)
1977–1982	Vida		(19)
1982–1986	Real Murcia	111	(51)
1986–1988	Hércules	45	(13)
1988–1989	Motagua		(2)
1989	Cartaginés	15	(4)
1990	Vida		

International career^{‡}
1980–1985	Honduras	28	(14)
- * Club domestic league appearances and goals as of 24 November 2011 ‡ National team caps and goals as of 24 November 2011

José Roberto Figueroa Padilla, also known as Macho, (15 December 1959 – 24 May 2020) was a Honduran footballer who played as a forward, in Honduras for F.C. Motagua, C.D.S. Vida and in Spain for Real Murcia and Hércules CF. He also represented Honduras at the 1982 FIFA World Cup.

== Club career ==
Macho Figueroa was a forward. One of his best technical movements was a powerful shot. After a great participation with Honduras in the 1982 FIFA World Cup, his services were acquired by Real Murcia of the Spanish Second Division. By dint of goals, Figueroa contributed to his team when it returned to La Liga. His league debut was against Real Sociedad where he had a good afternoon scoring two goals. He scored eleven goals in each of the two seasons he played in La Liga. A hat trick against CD Málaga on the third day of the 1984–85 season earned him the position of top scorer in the category. Over time, Macho with his goals became one of the most important players in the history of Real Murcia.

He finished his career at the team where he started his professional career, C.D.S. Vida, after a stint in Costa Rica with C.S. Cartaginés.

== International career ==
Figueroa made his debut for Honduras in 1980 and earned at least 28 caps, scoring 14 goals. He has represented his country in 19 FIFA World Cup qualification matches and was part of the 1982 FIFA World Cup squad in Spain, where he played all 3 matches.

=== International goals ===
Scores and results list Honduras' goal tally first.

N.	Date	Venue	Opponent	Score	Result	Competition
1.	8 April 1980	Estadio Nemesio Díez, Toluca, Mexico	Mexico		1–5	Friendly match
2.	23 November 1980	Estadio Cuscatlán, San Salvador, El Salvador	El Salvador	1–2	1–2	1982 FIFA World Cup qualification
3.	14 December 1980	Estadio Nacional, Tegucigalpa, Honduras	Panama	3–0	5–0	1982 FIFA World Cup qualification
4.	14 December 1980	Estadio Nacional, Tegucigalpa, Honduras	Panama	5–0	5–0	1982 FIFA World Cup qualification
5.	3 November 1981	Estadio Nacional, Tegucigalpa, Honduras	Haiti	4–0	4–0	1982 FIFA World Cup qualification
6.	12 November 1981	Estadio Nacional, Tegucigalpa, Honduras	Canada	2–1	2–1	1982 FIFA World Cup qualification
7.	15 June 1984	Estadio Armando Dely Valdés, Colón, Panama	Panama	2–0	3–0	1986 FIFA World Cup qualification
8.	15 June 1984	Estadio Armando Dely Valdés, Colón, Panama	Panama	3–0	3–0	1986 FIFA World Cup qualification
9.	24 June 1984	Estadio Nacional, Tegucigalpa, Honduras	Panama	1–0	1–0	1986 FIFA World Cup qualification
10.	6 March 1985	Estadio Nacional, Tegucigalpa, Honduras	Suriname	1–0	2–1	1986 FIFA World Cup qualification
11.	6 March 1985	Estadio Nacional, Tegucigalpa, Honduras	Suriname	2–0	2–1	1986 FIFA World Cup qualification
12.	11 August 1985	Estadio Nacional, San José, Costa Rica	Costa Rica	1–0	2–2	1986 FIFA World Cup qualification
13.	8 September 1985	Estadio Nacional, Tegucigalpa, Honduras	Costa Rica	2–1	3–1	1986 FIFA World Cup qualification
14.	8 September 1985	Estadio Nacional, Tegucigalpa, Honduras	Costa Rica	3–1	3–1	1986 FIFA World Cup qualification

== Managerial career ==
In October 2012, he was named sporting director of Honduran Second Division side Real Sociedad after he lived in the US for 14 years.

== Death ==
Figueroa died on 24 May 2020, in San Francisco, California, after suffering a cardiac arrest.
