= Prudencio Norales =

Honduran footballer (born 1956)

Personal information
- Full name: Prudencio Norales Martínez
- Date of birth: 20 April 1956 (age 70)
- Place of birth: Honduras
- Position: Midfielder

Senior career*
Years	Team	Apps	(Gls)
1977–1989	Olimpia		(73)
1989–1990	Curacao		(3)
1990–1991	Súper Estrella		(9)
1991–1992	Atlético Indio		(3)

International career
1977	Honduras U-20		
1980–1982	Honduras		
- * Club domestic league appearances and goals

Prudencio Norales Martínez (born 20 April 1956) is a Honduran retired footballer who played as a midfielder for Honduras in the 1982 FIFA World Cup.

== Club career ==
Nicknamed Tecate, Norales also played for Olimpia. He is one of the few players who scored four goals in a Honduran league game, against Atlético Portuario in October 1979. He scored 88 goals in total in the Honduran League and scored the 500th league goal in Olimpia's history on 22 July 1979, also against Atlético Portuario.

== International career ==
Norales played at the 1977 FIFA World Youth Championship, where he scored the winning goal in their first game against Morocco.

Norales represented Honduras in 5 FIFA World Cup qualification matches and played in 2 games at the 1982 FIFA World Cup.
