= Ángel Obando =

Honduran footballer (born 1956)

Personal information
- Full name: Ángel Antonio Obando
- Date of birth: 3 June 1956 (age 70)
- Place of birth: Honduras
- Position: Forward

Senior career*
Years	Team	Apps	(Gls)
1972–1986	Motagua	300	(77)
	Atlético Morazán		(5)
	Universidad		(1)
- * Club domestic league appearances and goals

Ángel Obando (born 3 June 1956) is a Honduran retired footballer.

== Club career ==
Nicknamed Toño, he is currently the 11th top goal scorer in the history of the Honduran football league with 83 goals, and the second top scorer of all times for F.C. Motagua with 77.
