= Luis Reyes (Honduran footballer) =

Honduran footballer (born 1958)

Personal information
- Full name: Luis Alberto Reyes Nuñez
- Date of birth: 19 March 1958 (age 68)
- Place of birth: Honduras
- Position: Forward

Senior career*
Years	Team	Apps	(Gls)
1976–1985	Motagua	275	(54)

International career
1980	Honduras		

Managerial career
- 2000: Motagua
- 2011: Motagua
- * Club domestic league appearances and goals as of 1985

Luis Alberto Reyes Nuñez (born 19 March 1958) is a retired Honduran football player who is currently the fourth all-time scorer for F.C. Motagua.

== Club career ==
Nicknamed Chito, Reyes played forward from season 1978–79 to 1984–85. He scored three goals in the 1979 league final.

He also managed Motagua in 1999–2000 Clausura winning that season.

== International career ==
Reyes was a non-playing squad member at the 1977 FIFA World Youth Championship. He has also represented his country in 5 FIFA World Cup qualification matches

== Honours ==
Motagua

League: 1978–79
League: 1999–00 C (as manager)

== Goals scored ==
1976–77: 9 goals
1977–78: 7 goals
1978–79: 9 goals
1979–80: 3 goals
1980–81: 2 goals
1981–82: 5 goals
1982–83: 8 goals
1983–84: 8 goals
1984–85: 3 goals
