= Promotion and relegation in Liga Nacional de Fútbol de Honduras =

Honduran league promotion and relegation system.

== History ==
- From 1965–66 to present

| Season | Promoted | Relegated |
|---|---|---|
| 1965–66 | none | none |
| 1966–67 | none | Troya |
| 1967–68 | Atlético Indio | San Pedro |
| 1968–69 | Victoria | Atlético Español |
| 1969–70 | Lempira | Progreso |
| 1970–71 | Atlético Español | Victoria |
| 1971–72 | Troya | Lempira |
| 1972–73 | Universidad | none |
| 1973–74 | none | Troya |
| 1974–75 | Federal | Atlético Indio |
| 1975–76 | Atlántida | Atlántida |
| 1976–77 | Campamento | Campamento |
| 1977–78 | Victoria | Federal |
| 1978–79 | Tiburones | Tiburones |
| 1979–80 | Atlético Portuario | Atlético Portuario |
| 1980–81 | Atlético Morazán | none |
| 1981–82 | Independiente Villela | Platense and Universidad |
| 1982–83 | Dandy | Independiente Villela |
| 1983–84 | Platense | Dandy |
| 1984–85 | Sula | Sula |
| 1985–86 | Tela Timsa | Universidad |
| 1986–87 | E.A.C.I. | Tela Timsa |
| 1987–88 | Universidad | E.A.C.I. |
| 1988–89 | Curacao | Universidad |
| 1989–90 | Súper Estrella | Curacao |
| 1990–91 | Tela Timsa | Sula |
| 1991–92 | Atlético Indio | Atlético Indio |
| 1992–93 | Real Maya | Súper Estrella |
| 1993–94 | Deportes Progreseño | Petrotela |
| 1994–95 | Broncos | Deportes Progreseño |
| 1995–96 | Independiente Villela | Broncos |
| 1996–97 | Universidad | none |
| 1997–98 | Palestino | Independiente Villela and Palestino |
| 1998–99 | Broncos | Real Maya |
| 1999–00 | Federal | Federal |
| 2000–01 | Deportes Savio | Broncos |
| 2001–02 | Real Comayagua | Deportes Savio |
| 2002–03 | Honduras Salzburg | Victoria |
| 2003–04 | Atlético Olanchano | Real Patepluma |
| 2004–05 | Valencia | Atlético Olanchano |
| 2005–06 | Hispano | Hispano |
| 2006–07 | Atlético Olanchano | Broncos UNAH |
| 2007–08 | Deportes Savio | Atlético Olanchano |
| 2008–09 | Real Juventud | Real Juventud |
| 2009–10 | Atlético Gualala | Real Juventud |
| 2010–11 | Necaxa | Hispano |
| 2011–12 | Atlético Choloma | Platense |
| 2012–13 | Real Sociedad | Atlético Choloma |
| 2013–14 | Parrillas One | Deportes Savio |
| 2014–15 | Honduras Progreso | Parrillas One |
| 2015–16 | Juticalpa | Victoria |
| 2016–17 | Social Sol | Social Sol |
| 2017–18 | UPNFM | Real Sociedad |
| 2018–19 | Real de Minas | Juticalpa |
| 2019–20 | Real Sociedad | none |
| 2020–21 | none | Real de Minas |
| 2021-22 | Olancho | Platense |
| 2022-23 | | Honduras Progreso |

== Name and franchise changes ==
- La Salle changed its name to San Pedro in 1966–67.
- Honduras changed its name to Progreso in 1969–70.
- Verdún bought Atlético Español's franchise in 1971–72.
- Broncos bought Verdún's franchise in 1972–73.
- Universidad bought Broncos's franchise in 1982–83 and changed its name to Broncos UNAH.
- Broncos UNAH changed its name back to Universidad in 1983–84.
- Atlético Morazán changed its name to Juventud Morazánica in 1983–84.
- Sula bought Juventud Morazanica's franchise in 1985–86 and changed its name to Juventud de Sula.
- Juventud de Sula changed its name back to Sula in 1986–87.
- Tela Timsa changed its name to Petrotela in 1991–92.
- Real Comayagua bought Real Maya's franchise in 2001–02.
- Real Maya bought Real Comayagua's franchise in 2002–03.
- Real Maya changed its name to Real Patepluma in 2002–03 Clausura.
- Honduras Salzburg withdrew for 2003–04, thereby leaving Victoria, who had actually been relegated in 2002–03.
- Universidad changed its name to Broncos UNAH in 2006–07.
- Hispano bought Valencia's franchise in 2006–07.
- Atlético Gualala and Real Juventud merge and kept the name Real Juventud in 2009–10.
- Platense bought Necaxa's franchise in 2012–13.
- Infop RNP changed its name to Real De Minas in 2018–19.

== Promotions and relegations by club ==
- As of April 2023

| Club | Promotions | Relegations |
|---|---|---|
| Universidad / Broncos UNAH | 3 | 4 |
| Victoria | 2 | 3 |
| Atlético Indio | 2 | 2 |
| Federal | 2 | 2 |
| Independiente Villela | 2 | 2 |
| Tela Timsa / Petrotela | 2 | 2 |
| Broncos | 2 | 2 |
| Real Maya / Real Patepluma | 2 | 2 |
| Atlético Olanchano | 2 | 2 |
| Real Juventud / Atlético Gualala | 2 | 2 |
| Deportes Savio | 2 | 1 |
| Real Sociedad | 2 | 1 |
| Troya | 1 | 2 |
| Sula | 1 | 2 |
| Hispano | 1 | 2 |
| Platense | 2 | 3 |
| Atlético Español | 1 | 1 |
| Lempira | 1 | 1 |
| Atlántida | 1 | 1 |
| Campamento | 1 | 1 |
| Tiburones | 1 | 1 |
| Atlético Portuario | 1 | 1 |
| Dandy | 1 | 1 |
| E.A.C.I. | 1 | 1 |
| Curacao | 1 | 1 |
| Súper Estrella | 1 | 1 |
| Deportes Progreseño | 1 | 1 |
| Palestino | 1 | 1 |
| Atlético Choloma | 1 | 1 |
| Honduras Progreso | 1 | 2 |
| Parrillas One | 1 | 1 |
| Social Sol | 1 | 1 |
| Juticalpa | 1 | 1 |
| Infop RNP / Real de Minas | 1 | 1 |
| Atlético Morazán | 1 | 0 |
| Honduras Salzburg | 1 | 0 |
| Valencia | 1 | 0 |
| Necaxa | 1 | 0 |
| UPNFM | 1 | 0 |
| San Pedro | 0 | 1 |
