= 1998–99 Honduran Segunda División =

Honduran Segunda División
- Season: 1998–99
- Champions: Federal
- Promoted: Federal
- All statistics correct as of 20 August 1999.

The 1998–99 Honduran Segunda División was the 32nd season of the Honduran Segunda División. Under the management of Miguel Escalante, C.D. Federal won the tournament after defeating C.D. Melgar in the final series and obtained promotion to the 1999–2000 Honduran Liga Nacional.

== Regular season ==
=== Standings ===
Group North

Pos	Team	Pts
1	Deportes Savio	54
2	Victoria	39
3	Olimpia Occidental	39
4	Social Sol	38
5	Real Sociedad	36
6	Aguán Valle	33
7	Vero	31
8	Marathón B	28
9	Juventud Occidental	28
10	Real Juventud	27
11	Palestino B	25
12	Real España B	18
13	Sula	16

Group South

Pos	Team	Pts
1	Tulín	38
2	Atlético Melgar	37
3	Federal	31
4	Motagua B	28
5	Comayagua	22
6	Juventud Catacamas	21
7	Atlético Independiente	17
8	Fantasmas del Broncos	15
9	Universidad B	15
10	Broncos B	13

== Postseason ==
=== Final ===
August 1999 1st leg	Atlético Melgar	1–1	Federal

20 August 1999 2nd leg	Federal	1–1 (7–6 p)	Atlético Melgar	Tegucigalpa, Francisco Morazán
				Stadium: Estadio Tiburcio Carías Andino

- Federal 2–2 Melgar on aggregated. Federal won 7–6 on penalty shoot-outs
