= Independiente de San Pedro Sula =

- Full name: Independiente de San Pedro Sula
- Nicknames: Millonarios; La Franja; Choriceros
- Ground: Estadio Francisco Morazán, San Pedro Sula, Honduras
- Capacity: 21,000
Home colours	Away colours	Third colours

Independiente de San Pedro Sula was a football club located in San Pedro Sula, Honduras. The club played several seasons in the Honduran Liga Nacional as well in the Honduran Amateur League.

== History ==
Independiente Villela obtained the Cortés regional championship in 1958 and had the right to play for the 1958–59 Honduran Amateur League which they eventually lost to Club Deportivo Olimpia. In 1980 they won the Honduran Segunda División, therefore gaining a spot at the 1981–82 Honduran Liga Nacional. They spent two years in first division until they were relegated in 1982–83. It was in the year 1992-1993 that the club was bought in the second division by businessman Miguel Villela owner of the Villela group and the team changed its nickname to chorizeros for the reason that it is a sausage company and added Villela to the club's name. Their second chance in the premier division came 12 years later when they conquered the 1994 Honduran Segunda División. During the next three years they acquired big names to their rosters such as Reynaldo Pineda, Milton Reyes, Wilmer Cruz and Leonardo Isaula; however, they faced relegation again in 1997–98. Due to economic problems and little support from their executives, the club was eventually dissolved.

== League performance ==
Season	GP	W	D	L	F	A	D	Pts	Finish
1981–82	30	6	13	11	34	41	−7	25	9th
1982–83	27	6	8	13	25	38	−13	20	Relegated
1995–96	27	4	15	8	24	32	−8	27	9th
1996–97	27	5	8	14	24	43	−19	23	10th
1997–98	40	3	14	23	42	87	−45	23	Relegated
All-time record	151	24	58	69	149	241	–92	106	21

== Achievements ==
- Segunda División
  - Winners (2): 1980, 1994–95
  - Runners-up (1): 1983
- Amateur League
  - Runners-up (1): 1958–59
- Cortés Championship
  - Winners (2): 1958, 1961

== Colours and badge ==
Its original colors were: white shirt with a red stripe from the right shoulder to the left hip, blue shorts and white socks the club's classic uniform. later with the name change to Independiente Villela's home colours were white and red stripes jerseys and blue shorts and socks. Their away colours were blue and yellow.

== Stadium ==
Independiente Villela played their home matches at Estadio Francisco Morazán

== See also ==
- List of football clubs in Honduras
