= 1992–93 Honduran Liga Nacional =

Liga Nacional
- Season: 1992–93
- Champions: Olimpia (11th)
- Relegated: Súper Estrella
- CONCACAF Champions' Cup: Olimpia; Petrotela
- Matches: 155
- Goals: 388 (2.5 per match)
- Top goalscorer: Arriola (12)

The 1992–93 Honduran Liga Nacional season was the 27th edition of the Honduran Liga Nacional. The format of the tournament remained the same as the previous season. Club Deportivo Olimpia won the title after winning the regular season and the final round and qualified to the 1994 CONCACAF Champions' Cup along with runners-up C.D. Petrotela.

== 1992–93 teams ==
- Marathón (San Pedro Sula)
- Motagua (Tegucigalpa)
- Olimpia (Tegucigalpa)
- Petrotela (Tela)
- Platense (Puerto Cortés)
- Real España (San Pedro Sula)
- Real Maya (Tegucigalpa, promoted)
- Súper Estrella (Danlí)
- Victoria (La Ceiba)
- Vida (La Ceiba)

== Regular season ==
=== Standings ===
Pos	Team	Pld	W	D	L	GF	GA	GD	Pts	Qualification or relegation
1	Olimpia (Note: Olimpia clinched final spot as regular season winner.)	27	15	7	5	43	27	+16	37	Qualified to the Final round (Note: Top 5 qualified to the Final round.)
2	Petrotela	27	14	8	5	34	20	+14	36	Qualified to the Final round
3	Marathón	27	12	8	7	39	22	+17	32	Qualified to the Final round
4	Real España	27	11	8	8	51	32	+19	30	Qualified to the Final round
5	Motagua	27	10	10	7	41	34	+7	30	Qualified to the Final round
6	Platense	27	10	9	8	32	21	+11	29	
7	Victoria	27	9	10	8	36	37	−1	28	
8	Real Maya	27	8	10	9	37	34	+3	26	
9	Vida	27	3	10	14	17	39	−22	16	
10	Súper Estrella	27	0	6	21	14	78	−64	6	Relegated to Segunda División (Note: Súper Estrella relegated.)

== Final round ==
=== Pentagonal standings ===
Pos	Team	Pld	W	D	L	GF	GA	GD	Pts
1	Olimpia (Note: Olimpia champions as winners of both stages.)	8	6	2	0	15	6	+9	14
2	Marathón	8	3	3	2	11	8	+3	9
3	Motagua	8	2	3	3	10	13	−3	7
4	Petrotela (Note: Petrotela runners-up as second place in regular season.)	8	1	3	4	6	10	−4	5
5	Real España	8	0	5	3	2	7	−5	5

=== Results ===
The matches C.D. Marathón–Real C.D. España and Real España–F.C. Motagua were canceled due to lack of interest and shared points.

Home \ Away	MAR	MOT	OLI	PET	RES
Marathón	—	1–1	1–2	3–1	a
Motagua	2–3	—	0–3	1–1	3–1
Olimpia	2–1	3–1	—	3–2	0–0
Petrotela	0–0	1–2	0–1	—	1–0
Real España	0–2	a	1–1	0–0	—

Updated to match(es) played on 26 June 1993. Source: Diario Diez
Legend: Blue = home team win; Yellow = draw; Red = away team win.
For upcoming matches, an "a" indicates there is an article about the rivalry between the two participants.

== Top scorer ==
- (Honduras) Jorge Arriola (Real Maya) with 19 goals
- (Uruguay) Álvaro Izquierdo (Motagua) with 17 goals

== Squads ==
Marathón
(Costa Rica) Pedro Cubillo	(Honduras) José Luis "Joche" Alvarado	(Honduras) Walter "Gualala" Trejo
(Honduras) Neptaly Turcios	(Honduras) Nicolás Suazo Velásquez	(Honduras) Ciro Paulino "Palic" Castillo
(Honduras) José Antonio Mejía	(Honduras) Mario Beata	(Honduras) Víctor Coello
(Honduras) Dangelo Daltino Bautista	(Uruguay) Vicente Viera	(Honduras) José Ulloa Villatoro
(Honduras) Geovany Durón	(Brazil) Julio Pereira	(Honduras) Mauro Pacheco
(Honduras) Iván Nolasco	(Honduras) Javier Chavarría	(Honduras) Efraín "Pucho" Osorio
Motagua
(Honduras) Renán Aguilera	(Guatemala) Julio César Englenton Chuga	(Honduras) Marvin Geovany "Mango" Henríquez
(Honduras) Marvin Fonseca	(Uruguay) Alvaro Roberto Izquierdo	(Honduras) Carlos Mejía
(Honduras) Carlos Tejeda	(Honduras) Carlos Zelaya	(Honduras) Jorge "Babington" López
(Honduras) Oscar Duarte	(Honduras) Víctor López	(Honduras) Oscar Pineda Torres
(Honduras) German Bermúdez	(Uruguay) Jorge González	(Honduras) Ramón "Monchín" Rodríguez
(Honduras) Oscar Murillo	(Honduras) Walter Lagos Aplícano	(Honduras) Miguel "Hino" Mathews
(Uruguay) Gustavo Luca	(Honduras) Henry Guevara	(Honduras) German "Ñato" Rodríguez
(Honduras) Héctor Caballero	(Brazil) Rui Freitas	(Honduras) Presley Carson
(Honduras) Giovanni "Venado" Castro	(Honduras) Donaldo Reyes Guillén	(Honduras) Rosman Calderón
(Honduras) Jorge Romero	(Uruguay) Néstor Fernández	(Honduras) Edgar Sierra
(Honduras) Carlos Rodríguez	(Honduras) José Manuel Vallecillo	(Honduras) Víctor Bennet
(Honduras) Saturnino Norales Arzú	(Honduras) Hernaín Arzú	(Honduras) Carlos Matamoros
(Honduras) Marlon Núñez	(Honduras) Fabricio Pérez	(Honduras) Jorge Cruz Murillo
(Honduras) Alex Geovany Ávila	(Honduras) César Augusto "Nene" Obando	(Honduras) Javier Padilla
(Honduras) Ramón Romero	(Honduras) Juan Manuel "Gato" Coello
Olimpia
(Honduras) Oscar Banegas	(Honduras) Belarmino Rivera	(Argentina) Gustavo Gerardo Priori
(Uruguay) Carlos José Laje Moreno	(Honduras) Eugenio Dolmo Flores	(Honduras) Nahúm Alberto Espinoza Zerón
(Honduras) Erick Darío Fú Lanza	(Honduras) José Antonio "Flaco" Hernández	(Honduras) Gilberto Gerónimo Yearwood
(Honduras) Nestor Peralta	(Honduras) Juan Carlos Espinoza	(Honduras) Dennis Antonio Piedy
(Honduras) Christian Santamaría	(Honduras) Arnold Cruz	(Honduras) Eduardo "Balín" Bennett
(Honduras) Alex Pineda Chacón	(Brazil) Denilson Costa de Oliveira	(Honduras) René Arturo David "Pupa" Martínez
(Honduras) José García	(Argentina) Luis Ramón Abdeneve	(Honduras) Denis Caballero
(Honduras) José Antonio García Bernárdez	(Honduras) Gregorio Serrano	(Honduras) Merlyn Membreño
(Honduras) Marlon "Pitufo" Hernández
Petrotela
(Honduras) Juan Pablo Centeno	(Honduras) Geovany Gayle Alarcón	(Honduras) Tomás Róchez
(Honduras) Pastor Martínez	(Honduras) Neptalí Fúnez	(Honduras) Nígel Zúniga
(Honduras) Golbin Bonilla	(Honduras) Miguel Velásquez	(Honduras) Alex Bahr
(Honduras) Carlos Landa	(Honduras) Víctor Orlando Garay	(Honduras) Luis "Gavilán" Cálix
(Uruguay) Julio María Lemus	(Honduras) Oscar Gerardo "Maradona" Cruz	(Honduras) Juan Manuel Anariba
(Uruguay) Alberto Bica	(Honduras) Eugenio Dolmo Flores	(Honduras) José Luis "Pili" Aguirre
(Honduras) David Logan	(Chile) Alfredo Saavedra	(Honduras) Alexis Duarte
Platense
(Honduras) Marlon Javier Monge	(Honduras) Rossel Cacho	(Honduras) Jorge Arita Neals
(Honduras) José Reynaldo Clavasquín	(Honduras) Pedro Álvarez	(Honduras) Héctor Amaya
(Honduras) Selvin Sánchez	(Uruguay) Fernando Ferreira	(Honduras) Carlos Roberto Velásquez
(Honduras) Mauricio Edgardo Figueroa	(Honduras) Miguel Ángel "Gallo" Mariano	(Honduras) Raúl Centeno Gamboa
(Honduras) Miguel "Payasito" Gómez	(Honduras) Domingo Drummond	(Honduras) Martín García
(Honduras) Luis Perdomo	(Honduras) Mauricio Figueroa
Real España
(Honduras) Wilmer Enrique "Supermán" Cruz	(Honduras) José Mauricio "Guicho" Fúnez Barrientos	(Honduras) Juan Ramón "Montuca" Castro
(Honduras) Karl Antonio Roland	(Honduras) Edgardo Emilson Soto Fajardo	(Honduras) Carlos Alberto Pavón Plummer
(Honduras) Marco Vinicio "Chacal" Ortega	(Honduras) José Luis "Pili" Aguirre	(Honduras) Carlos Fernando Landa
(Honduras) José Luis López Escobar	(Honduras) Camilo Bonilla Paz	(Honduras) Norman "Tedy" Martínez
(Honduras) Marco Antonio Anariba Zepeda	(Uruguay) Enrique Daniel Uberti García	(Honduras) Luis Orlando "Caralampio" Vallejo Arguijo
(Honduras) Nahamán Humberto González	(Honduras) Vincio Ortega	(Uruguay) Washington Leonardo "Piojo" Hernández
(Honduras) Víctor Martín Castro	(Honduras) Erick Gerardo Gallegos	(Honduras) Milton "Chocolate" Flores
Real Maya
(Honduras) Jorge Arturo Arriola	(Honduras) Nelson Rolando Rosales	(Honduras) Carlos Orlando Caballero
(Honduras) Edgardo Geovany "Yura" Róchez	(Honduras) Edith Hernando "Tibombo" Contreras	(Honduras) Juan Ramon Palacios
(Honduras) Pitio Centeno	(Honduras) Omar Suarez	(Honduras) Idefonso Bonilla
(Honduras) Ramón Chacon	(Honduras) Nelson Martinez	(Honduras) Carlos Cruz Padilla
(Honduras) Nelson Sambula	(Peru) Miguel "Loco" Seminario
Súper Estrella
(Honduras) Darío Mejía	(Honduras) Ramón Zavala	(Honduras) Héctor Posantes
(Honduras) Erick Rivera	(Honduras) Eduardo Yánez	(Honduras) Víctor Hernán Duarte
(Honduras) Luis Armando Fino	(Honduras) German Quijano	(Honduras) Edgardo "Chacho" Zamora
(Honduras) Geovany Galeas	(Honduras) Edgar Figueroa
Victoria
(Honduras) Jorge "Pollo" González	(Costa Rica) Alfredo Withaker	(Honduras) Enrique Reneau
(Honduras) Jorge Alberto "Bala" Bennett	(Honduras) Carlos Roberto "Condorito" Mejía Alvarenga
Vida
(Honduras) Jorge Ernesto Pineda

== Trivia ==
- Super Estrella didn't win a single match this season, and had the worst defense ever with 78 goals conceded in 27 games.
