= 1991–92 Honduran Segunda División =

Honduran Segunda División
- Season: 1991–92
- Champions: Real Maya
- Promoted: Real Maya
- All statistics correct as of 5 January 1992.

The 1991–92 Honduran Segunda División was the 25th season of the Honduran Segunda División. Under the management of Jorge Rivera, Real Maya won the tournament after finishing first in the final round (or Hexagonal) and obtained promotion to the 1992–93 Honduran Liga Nacional.

== Final round ==
Also known as Hexagonal.

=== Standings ===
Pos	Team	Pld	W	D	L	GF	GA	GD	Pts	Promotion
1	Real Maya	0	0	0	0	0	0	0	0	Promotion to Liga Nacional
2	Sitra Acensa	0	0	0	0	0	0	0	0	
3	missing	0	0	0	0	0	0	0	0	
4	missing	0	0	0	0	0	0	0	0	
5	missing	0	0	0	0	0	0	0	0	
6	missing	0	0	0	0	0	0	0	0	

=== Known results ===
5 January 1992	Sitra Acensa	2–3	Real Maya	San Lorenzo, Valle
	Goal		(PEN.)
