= 1981 Honduran Segunda División =

Honduran Segunda División
- Season: 1981–82
- Champions: Dandy
- Promoted: Dandy
- All statistics correct as of 17 December 1981.

The 1981 Honduran Segunda División was the 15th season of the Honduran Segunda División. Under the management of Raúl Ortiz, C.D. Dandy won the tournament after finishing first in the final round (or Cuadrangular) and obtained promotion to the 1982–83 Honduran Liga Nacional.

== Final round ==
Also known as Cuadrangular.

=== Standings ===
Pos	Team	Pld	W	D	L	GF	GA	GD	Pts	Promotion
1	Dandy	0	0	0	0	0	0	0	0	Promotion to Liga Nacional
2	Súper Estrella	0	0	0	0	0	0	0	0	
3	missing	0	0	0	0	0	0	0	0	
4	missing	0	0	0	0	0	0	0	0	

=== Known results ===
17 December 1981	Dandy	1–0	Súper Estrella	San Pedro Sula, Cortés
				Stadium: Estadio Francisco Morazán
