= 1995–96 Honduran Segunda División =

Honduran Segunda División
- Season: 1995–96
- Champions: Universidad
- Promoted: Universidad
- All statistics correct as of 28 April 1996.

The 1995–96 Honduran Segunda División was the 29th season of the Honduran Segunda División. Under the management of Miguel Escalante, Universidad won the tournament after finishing first in the final round (or Cuadrangular) and obtained promotion to the 1996–97 Honduran Liga Nacional.

== Final round ==
Also known as Cuadrangular.

=== Standings ===
Pos	Team	Pld	W	D	L	GF	GA	GD	Pts	Qualification
1	Atlético Independiente	6	4	0	2	12	5	+7	12	Playoff
2	Universidad	6	3	3	0	6	4	+2	12	Playoff
3	Atlético Nacional	6	1	3	2	8	12	−4	6	
4	Halcón Terrasos	6	0	2	4	6	11	−5	2	

=== Tie breaker ===
28 April 1996	Universidad	0–0 (4–2 p)	Atlético Independiente	Tegucigalpa, Francisco Morazán
				Stadium: Estadio Tiburcio Carías Andino
