= C.D. Victoria Leyde =

Honduran football team

Victoria Leyde was a football team based in La Ceiba, Honduras, which competed in the country's second division, the Liga de Ascenso. It was the reserve team of C.D. Victoria by the Rec.Sport.Soccer Statistics Foundation (RSSSF).

== History ==
Victoria Leyde played in the northern group of the Honduran second division for the 2001–02 season.

According to RSSSF in the 2002–03 season, former reserve teams were required to change their names and loosen their ties with their parent clubs when the Segunda División became the Liga de Ascenso. Victoria Leyde was listed among these teams, with Real Mallorca given as its new name. The following season's records again list a team named Victoria Leyde based in La Ceiba.

In the 2004–05 Apertura, Victoria Leyde competed in Group A of the northwestern zone.

In 2005–06, Victoria Leyde competed in the northwestern zone with Deportivo Lenca, Arsenal, Real Sociedad, Social Sol and Unión Arenense.

La Prensa mentioned that Victoria Leyde was bottom of Group A and had five points in the cumulative relegation standings.
