= Martín Castro =

Honduran footballer (born 1969)

Personal information
- Full name: Víctor Martín Castro
- Date of birth: 3 December 1969 (age 56)
- Place of birth: Tela, Honduras
- Position: Midfielder

Senior career*
Years	Team	Apps	(Gls)
1988–1989	Broncos UNAH	–	(–)
1989–1990	Deportes Progreseño	–	(–)
1991–1997	Real España	500	(7)
1997–1998	Independiente Villela	–	(3)

International career^{‡}
1995	Honduras	2	(0)
- * Club domestic league appearances and goals as of 2013 ‡ National team caps and goals as of 2013

Martín Castro (born 3 December 1969) is a Honduran former football player.

== Club career ==
Martín Castro was born in Tela. After having short spells at Broncos UNAH and Deportes Progreseño, he was trespassed to Real España in 1991. With the club, Castro won the 1993-94 Honduran tournament, crowned with the team as campeonísimo. In 1995-96 championship, Castro scored an amazing goal to Olimpia in Tegucigalpa, during the hexagonal game of the tournament.

He ended his career on Independiente Villela in 1998.

== Personal life ==
In 1999, Martín Castro went to United States, looking for work. Now he works as a cleaner of drywall structures and windows in Miami Beach, Florida. He married Claudia Dolmo and has two children: Ashley and Andrea.
