= 1989–90 Honduran Segunda División =

Honduran Segunda División
- Season: 1989–90
- Champions: Tela Timsa
- Promoted: Tela Timsa
- All statistics correct as of 4 February 1990.

The 1989–90 Honduran Segunda División was the 23rd season of the Honduran Segunda División. Under the management of Roberto Scalessi, Tela Timsa won the tournament after finishing first in the final round (or Hexagonal) and obtained promotion to the 1990–91 Honduran Liga Nacional.

== Final round ==
Also known as Hexagonal.

=== Standings ===
Pos	Team	Pld	W	D	L	GF	GA	GD	Pts	Promotion
1	Tela Timsa	0	0	0	0	0	0	0	0	Promotion to Liga Nacional
2	Universidad	0	0	0	0	0	0	0	0	
3	missing	0	0	0	0	0	0	0	0	
4	missing	0	0	0	0	0	0	0	0	
5	missing	0	0	0	0	0	0	0	0	
6	missing	0	0	0	0	0	0	0	0	

=== Known results ===
4 February 1990	Universidad	0–0	Tela Timsa	Tegucigalpa, Francisco Morazán
				Stadium: Estadio Tiburcio Carías Andino
