= 1984 Honduran Segunda División =

Honduran Segunda División
- Season: 1984–85
- Champions: Tela Timsa
- Promoted: Tela Timsa
- All statistics correct as of 30 December 1984.

The 1984 Honduran Segunda División was the 18th season of the Honduran Segunda División. Under the management of Alfredo Barahona, Tela Timsa won the tournament after finishing first in the final round (or Cuadrangular) and obtained promotion to the 1985–86 Honduran Liga Nacional.

== Final round ==
Also known as Cuadrangular.

=== Standings ===
Pos	Team	Pld	W	D	L	GF	GA	GD	Pts	Promotion
1	Tela Timsa	0	0	0	0	0	0	0	0	Promotion to Liga Nacional
2	Atlético Independiente	0	0	0	0	0	0	0	0	
3	missing	0	0	0	0	0	0	0	0	
4	missing	0	0	0	0	0	0	0	0	

=== Known results ===
30 December 1984	Tela Timsa	1–0	Atlético Independiente	San Pedro Sula, Cortés
				Stadium: Estadio Francisco Morazán
