= 2006–07 Honduran Liga Nacional de Ascenso =

Liga de Ascenso
- Season: 2006–07
- Champions: Apertura: Deportes Savio; Clausura: Arsenal
- Promoted: Deportes Savio
- All statistics correct as of 3 June 2007.

The 2006–07 Honduran Liga Nacional de Ascenso was the 40th season of the Second level in Honduran football and the fifth under the name Liga Nacional de Ascenso. Under the management of Carlos Martínez, Deportes Savio won the tournament after defeating Arsenal F.C. in the promotion series and obtained promotion to the 2007–08 Honduran Liga Nacional.

== Promotion ==
May 2007 1st leg	Deportes Savio	1–0	Arsenal	Santa Rosa de Copán, Copán
				Stadium: Estadio Sergio Antonio Reyes

3 June 2007 2nd leg	Arsenal	0–0	Deportes Savio	Roatán, Bay Islands
				Stadium: Coxen Hole Stadium

- Deportes Savio won 1–0 on aggregate.
