= 1974 Honduran Segunda División =

Honduran Segunda División
- Season: 1974–75
- Champions: Atlántida
- Promoted: Atlántida
- All statistics correct as of 29 December 1974.

The 1974 Honduran Segunda División was the eighth season of the Honduran Segunda División. Under the management of Héctor Bernárdez, C.D. Atlántida won the tournament after defeating Salamar de San Lorenzo in the final series and obtained promotion to the 1975–76 Honduran Liga Nacional.

== Final ==
December 1974 1st leg	Salamar	2–1	Atlántida

29 December 1974 2nd leg	Atlántida	2–1 (6–5 p)	Salamar	San Pedro Sula, Cortés
				Stadium: Estadio Francisco Morazán

- Atlántida 3–3 Salamar on aggregate. Atlántida won 6–5 on penalties
