= 1990–91 Honduran Segunda División =

Honduran Segunda División
- Season: 1990–91
- Champions: Atlético Indio
- Promoted: Atlético Indio
- All statistics correct as of 20 January 1991.

The 1990–91 Honduran Segunda División was the 24th season of the Honduran Segunda División. Under the management of Rubén Guifarro, Atlético Indio won the tournament after finishing first in the final round (or Hexagonal) and obtained promotion to the 1991–92 Honduran Liga Nacional.

== Final round ==
Also known as Hexagonal.

=== Standings ===
| Pos | Team | Pld | W | D | L | GF | GA | GD | Pts | Promotion |
|---|---|---|---|---|---|---|---|---|---|---|
| 1 | Atlético Indio | 0 | 0 | 0 | 0 | 0 | 0 | 0 | 0 | Promotion to Liga Nacional |
| 2 | Palestino | 0 | 0 | 0 | 0 | 0 | 0 | 0 | 0 | |
| 3 | missing | 0 | 0 | 0 | 0 | 0 | 0 | 0 | 0 | |
| 4 | missing | 0 | 0 | 0 | 0 | 0 | 0 | 0 | 0 | |
| 5 | missing | 0 | 0 | 0 | 0 | 0 | 0 | 0 | 0 | |
| 6 | missing | 0 | 0 | 0 | 0 | 0 | 0 | 0 | 0 | |

=== Known results ===
| 20 January 1991 | Atlético Indio | 1–0 | Palestino | Siguatepeque, Comayagua |
| | | | | Stadium: Estadio Roberto Martínez Ávila |
