= 1993–94 Honduran Segunda División =

Honduran Segunda División
- Season: 1993–94
- Champions: Broncos
- Promoted: Broncos
- All statistics correct as of 29 May 1994.

The 1993–94 Honduran Segunda División was the 27th season of the Honduran Segunda División. Under the management of Edwin Pavón, C.D. Broncos won the tournament after finishing first in the final round (or Hexagonal) and obtained promotion to the 1994–95 Honduran Liga Nacional.

== Final round ==
Also known as Hexagonal.

=== Standings ===
Pos	Team	Pld	W	D	L	GF	GA	GD	Pts	Promotion
1	Broncos	0	0	0	0	0	0	0	0	Promotion to Liga Nacional
2	Universidad	0	0	0	0	0	0	0	0	
3	missing	0	0	0	0	0	0	0	0	
4	missing	0	0	0	0	0	0	0	0	
5	missing	0	0	0	0	0	0	0	0	
6	missing	0	0	0	0	0	0	0	0	

=== Known results ===
29 May 1994	Broncos	1–1	Universidad	Choluteca, Choluteca
	Martínez (penalty missed)			Stadium: Estadio Fausto Flores Lagos
