= 1996–97 Honduran Liga Nacional =

Liga Nacional
- Season: 1996–97
- Dates: 31 August 1996–29 June 1997
- Champions: Olimpia (13th)
- CONCACAF Champions' Cup: Olimpia; Platense
- Matches: 149
- Goals: 314 (2.11 per match)
- Top goalscorer: Costa (13)
- Biggest home win: MOT 7–2 IND
- Biggest away win: MAR 0–3 RES
- Highest scoring: MOT 7–2 IND
- All statistics correct as of 29 June 1997.

The 1996–97 Honduran Liga Nacional season was the 31st edition of the Honduran Liga Nacional. The format of the tournament remained the same as the previous season. Club Deportivo Olimpia won the title after defeating C.D. Platense in the finals. Both teams qualified to the 1998 CONCACAF Champions' Cup. This was the last long-season tournament before the introduction of the Apertura and Clausura format.

== 1996–97 teams ==
- Independiente Villela
- Marathón
- Motagua
- Olimpia
- Platense
- Real España
- Real Maya
- Universidad (promoted)
- Victoria
- Vida

== Regular season ==
=== Standings ===
Pos	Team	Pld	W	D	L	GF	GA	GD	Pts	Qualification or relegation
1	Olimpia	27	15	6	6	40	25	+15	51	Qualified to the Final
2	Victoria	27	13	8	6	35	24	+11	47	Qualified to the Final round
3	Platense	27	13	8	6	28	20	+8	47	Qualified to the Final round
4	Motagua	27	11	9	7	37	25	+12	42	Qualified to the Final round
5	Marathón	27	10	7	10	31	29	+2	37	Qualified to the Final round
6	Real España	27	8	10	9	24	24	0	34	Qualified to the Final round
7	Universidad	27	6	10	11	17	27	−10	28	
8	Vida	27	7	7	13	21	33	−12	28	
9	Real Maya	27	5	11	11	20	27	−7	26	
10	Independiente Villela	27	5	8	14	24	43	−19	23	No relegation for this season

Updated to match(es) played on 6 April 1997. Source:

=== Results (Rounds 1–18) ===
Home \ Away	IND	MAR	MOT	OLI	PLA	RES	MAY	UNI	VIC	VID
Independiente Villela		0–1	0–1	1–0	0–0	0–2	2–0	0–0	2–1	2–0
Marathón	2–1		1–1	1–2	2–0	0–3	0–0	4–0	1–3	2–1
Motagua	4–1	2–1		1–3	1–1	2–1	1–2	1–0	1–1	3–0
Olimpia	5–1	0–1	0–0		2–0	0–0	1–0	1–0	3–5	2–1
Platense	2–0	3–1	1–1	2–1		2–1	1–0	2–0	1–0	1–1
Real España	1–0	0–0	1–0	1–1	0–0		1–1	2–1	1–1	1–0
Real Maya	1–1	1–1	0–0	0–0	0–2	2–0		0–1	1–1	1–2
Universidad	1–1	1–0	2–1	1–2	1–0	0–1	0–1		1–1	0–0
Victoria	1–0	1–0	2–2	1–2	1–0	2–1	1–0	1–1		1–0
Vida	0–0	1–1	2–1	1–2	0–1	2–1	1–1	0–1	1–1	

Source: RSSSF.com
Legend: Blue = home team win; Yellow = draw; Red = away team win.
- Marathón–Olimpia abandoned at '70 (1–2). Result stood.

=== Results (Rounds 19–27) ===
Home \ Away	IND	MAR	MOT	OLI	PLA	RES	MAY	UNI	VIC	VID
Independiente Villela		0–3		1–3	1–1		4–1			1–2
Marathón				2–3				1–0	0–0	
Motagua	7–2	1–0					1–1	2–0	0–2	
Olimpia			0–0			2–0	2–1			1–0
Platense		1–2	1–0	1–0		1–1				2–0
Real España	2–2	0–0	0–1				1–0	1–1		
Real Maya		3–1			0–1			0–0	2–0	1–1
Universidad	1–1			2–2	1–1				1–0	
Victoria	1–0			1–0	3–0	2–1				1–2
Vida		1–3	0–2			1–0		1–0		

Source: RSSSF.com
Legend: Blue = home team win; Yellow = draw; Red = away team win.

== Final round ==
=== Hexagonal ===
3 May 1997 1st leg	Real España	1–1	Olimpia	San Pedro Sula, Cortés
				Stadium: Estadio Francisco Morazán

11 May 1997 2nd leg	Olimpia	1–2	Real España	Tegucigalpa, Francisco Morazán
	Caballero		Mariano; Mendieta	Stadium: Estadio Tiburcio Carías Andino

- Real España won 3–2 on aggregated.

3 May 1997 1st leg	Marathón	2–0	Victoria	San Pedro Sula, Cortés
				Stadium: Estadio Francisco Morazán

10 May 1997 2nd leg	Victoria	2–0	Marathón	La Ceiba, Atlántida
				Stadium: Estadio Nilmo Edwards

- Victoria 2–2 Marathón on aggregated. Victoria advanced on better Regular season record.

4 May 1997 1st leg	Motagua	2–2	Platense	Tegucigalpa, Francisco Morazán
	Costa; Soares		Fernández; Duarte	Stadium: Estadio Tiburcio Carías Andino

11 May 1997 2nd leg	Platense	2–1	Motagua	Puerto Cortés, Cortés
	Cárcamo			Stadium: Estadio Excélsior

- Platense won 4–3 on aggregated.

=== Triangular ===
Pos	Team	Pld	W	D	L	GF	GA	GD	Pts	Qualification or relegation
1	Platense	4	3	0	1	8	3	+5	9	Qualified to the Final
2	Victoria	4	2	1	1	5	6	−1	7	
3	Real España	4	0	1	3	3	7	−4	1	

Updated to match(es) played on 11 June 1997. Source:

16 May 1997	Real España	1–1	Victoria	San Pedro Sula, Cortés
				Stadium: Estadio Francisco Morazán

24 May 1997	Victoria	1–0	Platense	La Ceiba, Atlántida
				Stadium: Estadio Nilmo Edwards

1 June 1997	Platense	3–1	Real España	Puerto Cortés, Cortés
				Stadium: Estadio Excélsior

4 June 1997	Victoria	2–1	Real España	La Ceiba, Atlántida
	Martínez; Naif		Gómez	Stadium: Estadio Nilmo Edwards

8 June 1997	Platense	4–1	Victoria	Puerto Cortés, Cortés
				Stadium: Estadio Excélsior

11 June 1997	Real España	0–1	Platense	San Pedro Sula, Cortés
				Stadium: Estadio Francisco Morazán

=== Final ===
22 June 1997 1st leg	Platense	1–1	Olimpia	Puerto Cortés, Cortés
	Cárcamo 90'		17' Williams	Stadium: Estadio Excélsior

29 June 1997 2nd leg	Olimpia	3–0	Platense	Tegucigalpa, Francisco Morazán
	Flores 10'; Velásquez 25' 62'			Stadium: Estadio Tiburcio Carías Andino

- Olimpia won 4–1 on aggregated.

== Top scorer ==
- (Brazil) Denilson Costa (Motagua) with 13 goals

== Squads ==
Independiente Villela
(Honduras) José Lino Casildo	(Honduras) Walter "Gualala" Trejo	(Honduras) Reynaldo "Chino" Pineda
(Honduras) Mauricio Edgardo Figueroa	(Honduras) José Ulloa Villatoro	(Honduras) Oscar "Pando" Gómez
(Uruguay) Washington Leonardo Rodríguez	(Honduras) Edgardo Emilson Soto Fajardo	(Argentina) Sandro Andreani
(Honduras) Alex Roberto Bailey
Marathón
(Honduras) Dangelo Daltino Bautista	(Honduras) Luis Orlando "El Chinito" Reyes	(Honduras) Ciro Paulino "Palic" Castillo
(Honduras) Bayron Suazo	(Honduras) Behiker Bustillo	(Honduras) Jorge Ferdín
(Brazil) Jose Christiano Pinheiro de Araujo	(Brazil) Marco da Silva	(Honduras) Edwin Alexander Medina
(Honduras) Pompilio Cacho Valerio	(Brazil) Octavio Santana	(Honduras) Luis Perdomo
(Brazil) Jurandir de Jesús Damacena
Motagua
(Honduras) Elvis Misael Castellanos	(Brazil) Denilson Costa de Oliveira	(Honduras) Juan Carlos Raudales
(Honduras) Dangelo Bautista	(Honduras) Javier Padilla	(Honduras) Fabricio "Amapala" Pérez
(Honduras) Aron Hernández	(Honduras) Henan Centeno	(Honduras) Edgar Sierra Puerto
(Honduras) Oscar "olanchano" Duarte	(Honduras) Oscar "Chicano" Lagos	(Honduras) Ramon Romero "Romerito"
(Brazil) Francisco Soares de Souza
Olimpia
(Honduras) Eugenio Dolmo Flores	(Argentina) Carlos Enrique Prono	(Honduras) Jorge Samuel Caballero
(Honduras) Rudy Alberto Williams	(Honduras) Norberto Martínez	(Honduras) Nahúm Espinoza Zerón
(Uruguay) Álvaro Roberto Izquierdo	(Honduras) Marlon "Pitufo" Hernández	(Honduras) Wilmer Peralta
(Honduras) Gregorio Serrano	(Honduras) Merlyn Membreño	(Honduras) Nahamán González
(Honduras) Wilmer Neal "Matador" Velásquez	(Honduras) Alex Pineda Chacón	(Honduras) Eduardo Arriola
(Honduras) Christian Santamaría
Platense
(Honduras) Rodolfo Vargas	(Panama) Ricardo James	(Honduras) Oscar René Contreras
(Honduras) Alexander "Araña" Clark	(Panama) José Anthony Torres	(Honduras) Rony Morales
(Honduras) Julio César "Rambo" León	(Honduras) José Luis Piota	(Honduras) Wilmer Sandoval
(Honduras) Dennis Centeno	(Honduras) Antonio "Aguja" Laing	(Honduras) Luis Perdomo
(Honduras) Robel Bernárdez	(Argentina) Miguel Fernández	(Honduras) Marco Antonio Mejía
(Honduras) Dodsin Díaz	(Honduras) Reynaldo Clavasquín	(Honduras) Alexis Iván Duarte
(Honduras) Juan Manuel Cárcamo	(Honduras) Roberto Bernárdez	(Honduras) Jorge Arita Neals
(Argentina) Carlos González	(Honduras) Abel Rodríguez	(Honduras) Alex Geovany Ávila
(Honduras) Edgar Álvarez	(Honduras) Alex Alaniz
Real España
(Honduras) Wilmer Enrique "Supermán" Cruz	(Honduras) José Mauricio "Guicho" Fúnez Barrientos	(Honduras) Gustavo Adolfo Gallegos
(Honduras) Víctor Martín Castro	(Honduras) Miguel Angel "Gallo" Mariano	(Honduras) Camilo Bonilla Paz
(Uruguay) Washington Leonardo "Piojo" Hernández	(Honduras) Milton "Chocolate" Flores	(Honduras) Marco Vinicio "Chacal" Ortega
(Honduras) Marlon Javier Monge	(Honduras) Edward "Güicho" Barahona	(Honduras) Edgar Antonio Figueroa
Real Maya
(Honduras) Nelson Rolando Rosales	(Honduras) Edgardo Geovany "Yura" Róchez	(Honduras) Juan Fernando Palacios
(Honduras) Luis Lagos	(Honduras) David Cárcamo	(Honduras) Lenin Suarez
(Honduras) Alex Güity	(Honduras) Reynaldo Sanson	(Honduras) Gerardo Andino
(Honduras) Neptalí Funez	(Honduras) Erick "Misquito" Brown	(Honduras) Gerard Gordon
(Honduras) Hector Amaya	(Honduras) Nelson Palomo	(Honduras) Leroy Wood
Universidad
(Honduras) Marvin "Mango" Henríquez	(Honduras) Marco Antonio Anariba	(Honduras) Juan Alberto Flores Maradiaga
(Honduras) Marco Antonio Lagos	(Honduras) Troy Anderson	(Honduras) Danery Berrios
(Honduras) Enrique Espinoza	(Uruguay) Omar Vidal	(Honduras) Rony Zelaya
(Honduras) Juan Jose Craniotis	(Honduras) Jorge "Avioneta" Martinez	(Honduras) Javier Flores
(Honduras) Wilberto Maradiaga	(Honduras) Eduardo Sosa	(Honduras) M Sosa
Victoria
(Honduras) Raúl Martínez Sambulá	(Panama) Percival Piggott	(Honduras) Renán "Chimbo" Aguilera
(Honduras) Henan Funez	(Honduras) Jorge Ernesto Pineda	(Honduras) Juan Pablo Centeno
(Honduras) Javier Martínez	(Honduras) Miguel Arcángel Güity	(Honduras) Erick Fu
(Honduras) Jose Garcia	(Honduras) Geovanny Alarcón	(Argentina) Alejandro Naif
(Argentina) Juan Carlos Suárez	(Honduras) Renan Bengoché
Vida
(Honduras) Carlos Roberto Padilla	(Honduras) Carlos Matamoros	(Honduras) Franklin Walter
(Honduras) Rossel Cacho	(Paraguay) Irineo Núñez	(Honduras) Carlos Alvarado
(Honduras) Pastor Martinez	(Honduras) Fernando Dolmo	(Honduras) Nigel Zuniga
(Honduras) Mauro "La Pica" Rivas	(Honduras) Raul Dolmo	(Honduras) Carlos "Monchin" Rodríguez
(Honduras) Dennis Piedy	(Honduras) Clayd Lester Marson	(Honduras) Walter Argueta
(Honduras) René Arturo David "Pupa" Martínez

== Controversies ==
- On 12 October 1996, during a week 7 match between C.D. Marathón and Club Deportivo Olimpia, then Marathón's president José Yacamán ordered his team to quit the game as he claimed that they were being targeted by referee Arturo Tábora with controversial calls. The game was not resumed and the result stood 1–2 to Olimpia.
- In the last round, C.D. Motagua defeated Independiente Villela at Tegucigalpa with a 7–2 score. This game sentenced Independiente to certain relegation. However, the Chorizeros protested that Motagua had included defender Júnior Izaguirre in its lineup. Izaguirre, who was on the bench that day, saw a red card in a reserves game a week prior. In order to avoid further conflicts, the league decided to abolish relegation and invited Independiente to play in the 1997–98 season.
