= 1986 Honduran Segunda División =

Honduran Segunda División
- Season: 1986–87
- Champions: Universidad
- Promoted: Universidad
- All statistics correct as of 21 December 1986.

The 1986 Honduran Segunda División was the 20th season of the Honduran Segunda División. Under the management of Carlos Padilla, Universidad won the tournament after finishing first in the final round (or Cuadrangular) and obtained promotion to the 1987–88 Honduran Liga Nacional.

== Final round ==
Also known as Cuadrangular.

=== Standings ===
Pos	Team	Pld	W	D	L	GF	GA	GD	Pts	Promotion
1	Universidad	0	0	0	0	0	0	0	0	Promotion to Liga Nacional
2	Lempira Hermacasa	0	0	0	0	0	0	0	0	
3	missing	0	0	0	0	0	0	0	0	
4	missing	0	0	0	0	0	0	0	0	

=== Known results ===
21 December 1986	Lempira Hermacasa	2-2 (8-9)	Universidad	San Pedro Sula, Cortés
	18' 89'		59' 84'	Stadium: Estadio Francisco Morazán
