= Palestino F.C. =

Defunct association football club in Honduras

Palestino
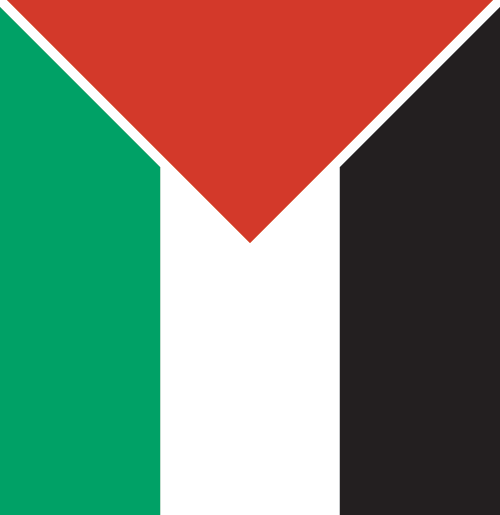
- Full name: Palestino Fútbol Club
- Nickname: Los Árabes (The Arabs)
- Founded: 1970
- Dissolved: 2001
- Ground: Estadio Francisco Morazán, San Pedro Sula, Honduras
- Capacity: 20,000
Home colours	Away colours	Third colours

Palestino Fútbol Club was a Honduran football club based in San Pedro Sula, Honduras.

== History ==
They played in first division in the 1997–98 season and spent time in the Liga Nacional de Ascenso de Honduras.

== Achievements ==
- Segunda División
  - Runners-up (3): 1990–91, 1992–93, 1999–2000

== League performance ==
Regular season									Post season							
Season	Pos.	G	W	D	L	F:A	PTS	+/-	Pos.	G	W	D	L	F:A	PTS	+/-
1997–98 A	10th	20	3	5	12	28:43	14	-15	Didn't enter							
1997–98 C	9th	20	4	6	10	20:38	18	-18	Didn't enter							

== All-time record vs. opponents ==
Opponent	G	W	D	L	F	A	PTS	+/-
Universidad	4	2	1	1	7	5	7	+2
Vida	4	2	0	2	7	7	6	0
Independiente Villela	4	1	2	1	3	3	5	0
Real Maya	4	1	1	2	5	8	4	-3
Marathón	4	1	0	3	6	13	3	-7
Victoria	4	0	2	2	4	7	2	-3
Platense	4	0	2	2	5	9	2	-4
Real España	4	0	1	3	3	9	1	-6
Motagua	4	0	1	3	5	10	1	-5
Olimpia	4	0	1	3	3	10	1	-7
