= 1966–67 Honduran Segunda División =

Honduran Segunda División
- Season: 1966–67
- Champions: Atlético Indio
- Promoted: Atlético Indio
- All statistics correct as of 26 February 1967.

The 1966–67 Honduran Segunda División was the first season of the Honduran Segunda División. Under the management of Mario Griffin, Atlético Indio won the tournament after defeating C.D. Victoria in the final series and obtained promotion to the 1967–68 Honduran Liga Nacional.

== Final ==
February 1967 1st leg	Victoria	3–4	Atlético Indio	La Ceiba, Atlántida
				Stadium: Estadio Nilmo Edwards

26 February 1967 2nd leg	Atlético Indio	1–1	Victoria	Tegucigalpa, Francisco Morazán
				Stadium: Estadio Tiburcio Carías Andino

- Atlético Indio won 5–4 on aggregate.
