= 1999–2000 Honduran Segunda División =

Honduran Segunda División
- Season: 1999–2000
- Champions: Deportes Savio
- Promoted: Deportes Savio
- All statistics correct as of 16 July 2000.

The 1999–2000 Honduran Segunda División was the 33rd season of the Honduran Segunda División. Under the management of Juan Ramos, Deportes Savio won the tournament after defeating Palestino F.C. in the final series and obtained promotion to the 2000–01 Honduran Liga Nacional.

== Final ==
11 July 2000 1st leg	Deportes Savio	1–1	Palestino	Santa Rosa de Copán
	77' Souza		88' Portillo	Stadium: Estadio Sergio Antonio Reyes

16 July 2000 2nd leg	Palestino	0–1 (1–2 agg.)	Deportes Savio	Choloma
			74' Zamora	Stadium: Estadio Rubén Deras; Referee: Argelio Sabillón
