= 1971–72 Honduran Segunda División =

Honduran Segunda División
- Season: 1971–72
- Champions: Universidad
- Promoted: Universidad
- All statistics correct as of 25 June 1972.

The 1971–72 Honduran Segunda División was the sixth season of the Honduran Segunda División. Under the management of Alfonso Uclés, Universidad won the tournament after defeating C.D. Victoria in the final series and obtained promotion to the 1972–73 Honduran Liga Nacional.

== Final ==
June 1972 1st leg	Victoria	2–2	Universidad	La Ceiba, Atlántida
				Stadium: Estadio Nilmo Edwards

25 June 1972 2nd leg	Universidad	0–0 (4–3 p)	Victoria	Tegucigalpa, Francisco Morazán
				Stadium: Estadio Tiburcio Carías Andino

- Universidad 2–2 Victoria on aggregate. Universidad won 4–3 on penalties
