= 1973 Honduran Segunda División =

Honduran Segunda División
- Season: 1973–74
- Champions: Federal
- Promoted: Federal
- All statistics correct as of 30 December 1973.

The 1973 Honduran Segunda División was the seventh season of the Honduran Segunda División. Under the management of Alfonso Uclés, C.D. Federal won the tournament after defeating San Pedro in the final series and obtained promotion to the 1974–75 Honduran Liga Nacional.

== Final ==
December 1973 1st leg	San Pedro	1–1	Federal	San Pedro Sula, Cortés
				Stadium: Estadio Francisco Morazán

30 December 1973 2nd leg	Federal	3–1	San Pedro	Tegucigalpa, Francisco Morazán
				Stadium: Estadio Tiburcio Carías Andino

- Federal won 4–2 on aggregate.
