= 1987–88 Honduran Segunda División =

Honduran Segunda División
- Season: 1986–87
- Champions: Curacao
- Promoted: Curacao
- All statistics correct as of 3 January 1988.

The 1987–88 Honduran Segunda División was the 21st season of the Honduran Segunda División. Under the management of Mario Sandoval, C.D. Curacao won the tournament after finishing first in the final round (or Cuadrangular) and obtained promotion to the 1988–89 Honduran Liga Nacional.

== Final round ==
Also known as Cuadrangular.

=== Standings ===
Pos	Team	Pld	W	D	L	GF	GA	GD	Pts	Promotion
1	Curacao	0	0	0	0	0	0	0	0	Promotion to Liga Nacional
2	Tela Timsa	0	0	0	0	0	0	0	0	
3	missing	0	0	0	0	0	0	0	0	
4	missing	0	0	0	0	0	0	0	0	

=== Known results ===
3 January 1988	Tela Timsa	2–1	Curacao	Tela, Atlántida
				Stadium: Estadio León Gómez
