= 1976 Honduran Segunda División =

Honduran Segunda División
- Season: 1976–77
- Champions: Victoria
- Promoted: Victoria
- All statistics correct as of 22 December 1976.

The 1976 Honduran Segunda División was the tenth season of the Honduran Segunda División. Under the management of Roberto Ortega, C.D. Victoria won the tournament after defeating C.D. Curacao in the final series and obtained promotion to the 1977–78 Honduran Liga Nacional.

== Final ==
December 1976 1st leg	Victoria	1–0	Curacao	La Ceiba, Atlántida
				Stadium: Estadio Nilmo Edwards

22 December 1976 2nd leg	Curacao	0–1	Victoria	Tegucigalpa, Francisco Morazán
				Stadium: Estadio Tiburcio Carías Andino

- Victoria won 2–0 on aggregate.
