= Deportes Savio F.C. =

Honduran football club

Deportes Savio
- Full name: Deportes Savio Fútbol Club
- Nickname(s): Toros Rojos (The Red Bulls); Totoposteros
- Founded: 1974
- Ground: Estadio Sergio Antonio Reyes; Santa Rosa de Copán, Honduras
- Capacity: 3,000
- Owner: Edward Mafla Cañizalez
- Chairman: Bernardo Alvarado Alvarado
- Manager: Mauro Reyes
- League: Liga de Ascenso de Honduras
- 2013 Clausura: 9th
Home colours	Away colours	Third colours

Deportes Savio Fútbol Club, commonly known as Deportes Savio, is a professional Honduran football club based in Santa Rosa de Copán. The club was founded in 1974, and participates in the Liga Nacional de Fútbol Profesional de Honduras. In 2006–07 they achieved the promotion to the top league of the Honduran League.

== History ==
They changed their name to Santo Domingo Savio in 1971, when Padre Chavarría was in charge of the team and wanted it to be a part of the Instituto Santo Domingo Savio in Santa Rosa de Copán. In 1995, a board of new directors bought the category of Deportes Progreseño of Segunda division and changed the name of the club to Deportes Savio.[1]

Deportes Savio was promoted to Liga Nacional de Futbol de Honduras for the first time in the 1999–2000 season but were relegated back down to Liga de Ascenso de Honduras after they finished in last place in the 2001–02 season. The team managed to earn a second promotion to Liga Nacional de Honduras by defeating Arsenal in the 2006–07 Liga de Ascenso promotion playoff.

In 2007, although they did not make the play-offs in their return to the top league, Deportes Savio was very successful, finishing fifth place in the standings and becoming the third best team with the highest average attendance.

Deportes Savio started the 2012, season in danger of being dropped from the Liga Nacional again. In the second tournament of the 2012 season (La Apertura), ownership of the team was assumed by Transfer Field Company (TFC). Changes in management and addition of new players led to a remarkable improvement in the team's position: they finished the season in 6th position with an undefeated home game record, after having reached the playoffs for the first time in the club's history.

TFC's President Eduar Mafla Canizalez, has a plan to build upon the recent success of Deportes Savio both within Honduras and around the world. The company has invested more than 2 million Lempiras in the team, particularly in business development. Recently Deportes Savio made an agreement with Banco De Occidente to increase their sponsorship of the team for the 2013–2014 season to 1.800.000 Lempiras.

In April 2014, the club was relegated to the Honduran second division after a 0–2 reverse at Olimpia.

== Achievements ==
- Segunda División / Liga de Ascenso

Winners (3): 1999–2000, 2004–05 A, 2006–07 A
Runners-up (3): 2002–03, 2004–05 C, 2015–16 A

== League performance ==
Regular season											Post season								
Season	Pos	P	W	D	L	F	A	PTS	+/-	Ded	Pos	P	W	D	L	F	A	PTS	+/-
2000–01 A	8th	18	5	6	7	24	24	21	0	–	Did not enter								
2000–01 C	10th	18	3	6	9	14	30	15	-16	–	Did not enter								
2001–02 A	10th	18	1	9	8	19	32	12	-13	–	Did not enter								
2001–02 C	7th	18	6	3	9	19	25	21	-6	–	Did not enter								
2007–08 A	5th	18	5	7	6	14	15	22	-1	–	Did not enter								
2007–08 C	9th	18	4	7	7	18	24	19	-6	–	Did not enter								
2008–09 A	5th	18	8	4	6	24	19	28	+5	-1	Did not enter								
2008–09 C	6th	18	5	5	8	17	21	19	-4	–	Did not enter								
2009–10 A	8th	18	4	5	9	13	23	17	-10	–	Did not enter								
2009–10 C	9th	18	4	5	9	13	23	17	-10	–	Did not enter								
2010–11 A	8th	18	5	6	7	22	30	21	-8	–	Did not enter								
2010–11 C	8th	18	5	5	8	25	36	20	-11	–	Did not enter								
2011–12 A	5th	18	6	6	6	22	25	24	-3	–	5th	2	1	0	1	3	3	3	0
2011–12 C	5th	18	6	6	6	22	25	24	-3	–	5th	2	1	0	1	3	3	3	0

== All-time record vs. opponents ==
- As of 2011–12 Apertura

Opponent	P	W	D	L	F	A	+/-	Ded.
Atletico Choloma	2	1	1	0	5	3	2	–
Broncos	5	0	4	1	3	6	-3	–
Hispano	16	7	2	7	13	16	-3	–
Marathón	26	7	7	12	25	45	-20	–
Motagua	26	4	12	11	26	35	-9	–
Necaxa	6	1	1	4	7	14	-7	–
Olimpia	26	3	9	14	19	38	-19	–
Platense	26	9	8	9	31	35	-3	–
Real Comayagua	4	0	2	2	3	9	-6	–
Real España	26	5	10	11	28	39	-11	-1
Real Juventud	8	3	2	3	11	10	+1	–
Universidad	8	2	1	5	6	11	-5	–
Victoria	26	8	8	10	32	36	-4	–
Vida	28	10	8	10	33	31	+2	–

== All-time top goalscorers ==
(As of March 2014), Liga Nacional only

- (Brazil) Ney Costa (44 goals)
- (Belize) Elroy Smith (13 goals)
- (Honduras) Juan Ramón Mejíaa (13 goals)
- (Honduras) Luis Ramírez (13 goals)
- (Brazil) Romario Pinto (12 goals
- (Honduras) Alex Roberto Bailey (12 goals)
- (Honduras) Reynaldo Pineda (11 goals)
- (Honduras) Aly Arreola (9 goals)
- (Belize) Harrison Róchez (8 goals)

== Most appearances ==
- (Honduras) Johnny Galdámez (178 matches)

== Current squad ==
2013 Apertura

Note: Flags indicate national team as defined under FIFA eligibility rules; some limited exceptions apply. Players may hold more than one non-FIFA nationality.

No.	Pos.	Nation	Player
1	GK	(Honduras) HON	Celio Valladares
2	DF	(Honduras) HON	Marco Antonio Torres
4	DF	(Honduras) HON	Pastor Ramón Martínez
5	DF	(Honduras) HON	Johny Galdámez
6	DF	(Honduras) HON	Angel Gabriel Castro
7	FW	(Brazil) BRA	Marcelo Souza
8	DF	(Honduras) HON	Oscar Fortín
9	FW	(Honduras) HON	Maynor Cabrera
10	MF	(Honduras) HON	Oscar Alberto García
11	FW	(Honduras) HON	Aly Arriola
13	FW	(Brazil) BRA	Ney Costa
14	MF	(Honduras) HON	Oliver Morazán
15	FW	(Honduras) HON	Angel Pineda
16	MF	(Brazil) BRA	Romário Pinto
17	MF	(Colombia) COL	Jhovanny Mina

No.	Pos.	Nation	Player
18	DF	(Honduras) HON	Vicente Solórzano
19	MF	(Honduras) HON	Kevin Portillo
20	MF	(Honduras) HON	Jorge Lozano
21	FW	(Honduras) HON	Luis Ramírez
22	MF	(Honduras) HON	Clayvin Zúniga
23	MF	(Honduras) HON	Francisco Benítez
24	MF	(Honduras) HON	Kevin Enamorado
25	MF	(Honduras) HON	Selvin Tinoco
26	MF	(Honduras) HON	Jesús Alberto Munguía
27	FW	(Honduras) HON	Jonathan Colón
28	MF	(Belize) BLZ	Jardehl Muschamp
29	GK	(Honduras) HON	Kelvin Castillo
30	MF	(Honduras) HON	Olban Castro
32	MF	(Honduras) HON	Kelvin Caballero
43	FW	(Honduras) HON	Cristian Sanabria

== Former managers ==
- (Honduras) René Flores (2000–2001)
- (Honduras) Hernán García (2001–2002)
- (Honduras) Sergio Roberto Flores
- (Honduras) David Aquiles (2002)
- (Honduras) Carlos Martínez (2008–2009)
- (Honduras) Santos Gonzales
- (Uruguay) Carlos Jurado (Aug 2009 – Mar 2010)
- (Honduras) Hernán García (Mar 2010 – Oct 2012)
- (Honduras) Emilio Umanzor (Jan-Mar 2013)
- (Honduras) Mauro Reyes (Apr 2013 – Apr 2014)
