= 1980 Honduran Segunda División =

Honduran Segunda División
- Season: 1980–81
- Champions: Independiente Villela
- Promoted: Independiente Villela
- All statistics correct as of 21 December 1980.

The 1980 Honduran Segunda División was the 14th season of the Honduran Segunda División. Under the management of Roberto Scalessi, Independiente Villela won the tournament after finishing first in the final round (or Cuadrangular) and obtained promotion to the 1981–82 Honduran Liga Nacional.

== Final round ==
Also known as Cuadrangular.

=== Standings ===
Pos	Team	Pld	W	D	L	GF	GA	GD	Pts	Promotion
1	Independiente Villela	0	0	0	0	0	0	0	0	Promotion to Liga Nacional
2	Curacao	0	0	0	0	0	0	0	0	
3	missing	0	0	0	0	0	0	0	0	
4	missing	0	0	0	0	0	0	0	0	

=== Known results ===
21 December 1980	Curacao	0–1	Independiente Villela	Tegucigalpa, Francisco Morazán
				Stadium: Estadio Tiburcio Carías Andino
