= 1982–83 Honduran Liga Nacional =

Liga Nacional
- Season: 1982–83
- Champions: Olimpia (6th)
- Relegated: Independiente
- CONCACAF Champions' Cup: Olimpia; Motagua
- Matches: 155
- Goals: 310 (2 per match)
- Top goalscorer: Altamirano (13)

The 1982–83 Honduran Liga Nacional season was the 17th edition of the Honduran Liga Nacional. The format of the tournament remained the same as the previous season, with the exception that no final series were played. Club Deportivo Olimpia won the title after finishing first in the final round and qualified to the 1983 CONCACAF Champions' Cup along with runners-up C.D. Motagua.

== 1982–83 teams ==
- Atlético Morazán (Tegucigalpa)
- Broncos UNAH (Choluteca)
- C.D. Dandy (San Pedro Sula, promoted)
- Independiente (San Pedro Sula)
- C.D. Marathón (San Pedro Sula)
- C.D. Motagua (Tegucigalpa)
- C.D. Olimpia (Tegucigalpa)
- Real C.D. España (San Pedro Sula)
- C.D. Victoria (La Ceiba)
- C.D.S. Vida (La Ceiba)

== Regular season ==
=== Standings ===
Pos	Team	Pld	W	D	L	GF	GA	GD	Pts	Qualification or relegation
1	Olimpia (Note: Olimpia secured Final spot as Regular season winner.)	27	11	11	5	33	17	+16	33	Qualified to the Final round (Note: Top five qualify to Final round.)
2	Motagua	27	9	13	5	31	28	+3	31	Qualified to the Final round
3	Real España	27	9	12	6	35	28	+7	30	Qualified to the Final round
4	Vida	27	5	20	2	24	21	+3	30	Qualified to the Final round
5	Victoria	27	7	15	5	21	15	+6	29	Qualified to the Final round
6	Atlético Morazán	27	7	13	7	26	33	−7	27	
7	Dandy	27	6	14	7	20	22	−2	26	
8	Broncos UNAH	27	5	12	10	30	36	−6	22	
9	Marathón	27	6	10	11	24	31	−7	22	
10	Independiente	27	6	8	13	25	38	−13	20	Relegated to Segunda División (Note: Independiente relegated to second division.)

== Final round ==
=== Pentagonal standings ===
Pos	Team	Pld	W	D	L	GF	GA	GD	Pts	Qualification or relegation
1	Olimpia (Note: Olimpia 1982–83 champions.)	8	4	3	1	7	6	+1	11	Qualified to the 1983 CONCACAF Champions' Cup
2	Motagua	8	2	5	1	13	7	+6	9	Qualified to the 1983 CONCACAF Champions' Cup
3	Real España	8	4	1	3	9	7	+2	9	
4	Victoria	8	2	3	3	6	12	−6	7	
5	Vida	8	1	2	5	6	10	−4	4	

=== Final ===
- No final series was necessary as Olimpia won both regular season and final round.

== Top scorer ==
- (Argentina) Luis O. Altamirano (Broncos UNAH) with 13 goals

== Squads ==
Atlético Morazán
(Honduras) José Luis Cruz Figueroa	(Honduras) Cruz Ramón Serrano "Guaya" Cruz	(Honduras) Noel Omar Renderos
(Honduras) Marco A. Ordóñez	(Honduras) Ramón Edgardo Moradel Zapata	(Honduras) Delio Billonay Fajardo
Broncos
(Argentina) Luis Oswaldo "Che" Altamirano	(Honduras) José Marcial "Canelo" Murillo	(Honduras) José Salomón "Turco" Nazzar
Dandy
(Honduras) Luis Alonso Guzmán Velásquez	(Honduras) Rigoberto Escalón	(Honduras) Oscar Villegas
(Honduras) Efraín "Pucho" Osorio	(Honduras) Roberto Escalón	(Honduras) Oscar Núñez
(Honduras) Oscar Montoya	(Honduras) Carlos Castellanos	(Honduras) René Orellana
(Honduras) Orlando Garay	(Honduras) Ricardo Castro	(Honduras) Carlos Flores
(Honduras) Edward Kisling	(Honduras) Carlos Alvarez	(Honduras) Jorge Martínez
(Honduras) Carlos Banegas	(Honduras) Roberto Moreno	(Honduras) Oscar "Hormiga" Muñoz
(Honduras) José Molina	(Honduras) Carlos Ramírez	(Honduras) Roger Valladares
(Honduras) Eleázar Peña	(Honduras) Jorge "Chino" Euceda	(Honduras) Claudio Romano Castro
(Honduras) Daniel "Diablo" Sambulá	(Honduras) Apolonio Sambulá	(Honduras) Arnold Connor Costly
(Honduras) Arnaldo Guevara	(Honduras) Oscar Torres	(Brazil) Benedito Tiburcio
(Honduras) Julio "Banana" Alvarez	(Honduras) Marcial Bonilla	(Honduras) Roberto Castellanos
(Honduras) Oscar Machigua	(Honduras) Oscar "Chino" Brizuela	(Honduras) Mario Bustillo
(Honduras) Oscar Ríos	(Honduras) Luis Guerrero	(Honduras) Noé Meza
(Honduras) Pastor Martínez	(Honduras) Benito Suazo	(Honduras) Luis Guzmán
(Honduras) Julio "Chino" Ortiz	(Honduras) Francisco Sandoval	(Honduras) Oscar Orellana
(Honduras) Guillermo Bernárdez	(Honduras) Manuel Rivera	(Honduras) Oscar "Pito Loco" López
Independiente
(Honduras) Jorge Martínez	(Honduras) Antonio "Gato" Pavón Molina	(Honduras) Rodolfo "Mirandinha" Smith
(Brazil) Edimar Luiz Marques	(Honduras) Roberto Herrera Moreno
Marathon
(Chile) Julio del Carmen Tapia Callao	(Honduras) Roy Arturo Padilla Bardales	Rodolfo 🇺🇾Machado Maciel
(Honduras) Roberto Reynaldo "Robot" Bailey Sargent	(Honduras) Arturo Payne	(Honduras) Othoniel Romero "Romerito"
(Honduras) Gilberto Leonel Machado García	(Honduras) Celso Fredy Güity	(Honduras) Hernán Santiago "Cortes" García Martínez
(Honduras) Jorge Alberto "Cuca" Bueso Iglesias	(Honduras) Félix Concepción Carranza	(Honduras) Arturo Torres "Pacharaca" Bonilla
(Honduras) José Angel Peña	(Honduras) Oscar René "Hormiga" Muñoz	(Honduras) Oswaldo Zaldívar
Motagua
(Honduras) Jorge Montenegro	(Honduras) Angel Antonio Obando	(Honduras) Luis Alberto "Chito" Reyes
(Honduras) Karl Bennett Williams	(Honduras) Moisés "Tanque" Velásquez	(Honduras) Roberto Escalante
(Honduras) Luis Medina	(Honduras) Amílcar Leonel Suazo
Olimpia
(Honduras) Oscar Banegas	(Honduras) José Mauricio "Guicho" Fúnez Barrientos	(Honduras) Oscar Garcia
(Honduras) Jorge Alberto "Indio" Urquía Elvir	(Honduras) Roberto "Pirata" Fernández	(Honduras) "Nilo" Martínez
(Honduras) Prudencio "Tecate" Norales	(Honduras) Emilio Martínez	(Honduras) Juan Alberto Flores Maradiaga
(Honduras) Alberto Merelles	(Honduras) Víctor Romero	(Honduras) Héctor Uclés
(Honduras) Alberto Centurión	(Chile) Mario Hernán Juviny Carreño	(Honduras) Jorge Alberto "Perro" González
(Honduras) Alejandro Ruiz	(Honduras) Ramón Antonio "Pilín" Brand	(Honduras) Oscar Medina
Real España
(Honduras) Julio César "El Tile" Arzú	(Honduras) Hernán Zelaya	(Honduras) Anthony "Hino" Hinds Mathews
(Honduras) Carlos Saúl Bonilla	(Honduras) Junior Rashford Costly	(Honduras) Edith Hernando Contreras
(Honduras) Carlos Orlando Caballero	(Honduras) Esteban Pitío Centeno	(Honduras) Marcos Campbell
(Honduras) Carlos Alberto Salgado	(Honduras) Jimmy Steward	(Honduras) Nahúm Alberto Espinoza Zerón
(Honduras) Julio Roberto "Chino" Ortiz
Victoria
(Honduras) Raúl David Fúnez	(Honduras) Jorge Alberto "Camioncito" Duarte	(Honduras) Efraín Martínez "Diablillo" Amaya
(Honduras) David Goff	(Honduras) Miguel Angel "Primitivo" Ortiz	(Honduras) Luis Alonso "Chorompo" Zúniga
(Honduras) José Reynaldo Villagra	(Honduras) Víctor Calero Lozano
Vida
(Honduras) Marvin Geovany "Mango" Henríquez	(Honduras) Alex Banegas	(Honduras) Matilde Selím Lacayo
(Honduras) Roberto "Macho" Figueroa	(Honduras) Junior Mejía	(Honduras) Ramón Nectaly "Liebre" Guardado
(Honduras) Marco Tulio "Zocadito" Zelaya

== Known results ==
=== Round 1 ===
Atlético Morazán	2–0	Motagua
Ordóñez

Tegucigalpa

Universidad	2–2	Olimpia

=== Round 2 ===
Olimpia	0–0	Vida

=== Round 3 ===
1982-02-28

Marathón	1–0	Olimpia

San Pedro Sula

=== Round 4 ===
Olimpia	0–1	Real España

=== Round 9 ===
1982-04-18

Marathón	–	Vida

San Pedro Sula

=== Round 14 ===
1982-05-16

Atlético Morazán	0–0	Marathón

1982-05-16

Dandy	1–0	Independiente

1982-05-16

Vida	0–0	Olimpia

La Ceiba
1982-05-16

Real España	1–0	Broncos UNAH

San Pedro Sula
1982-05-16

Motagua	0–0	Victoria

Tegucigalpa

=== Round 27 ===
Marathón	2–1	Independiente

San Pedro Sula

gol de Rodolfo Machado uruguayo jugador de Marathon

=== Pentagonal ===
12 September 1982	Real España	1–0	Olimpia	San Pedro Sula
	Matthews			Stadium: Estadio General Francisco Morazán

12 September 1982	Motagua	7–1	Victoria	Tegucigalpa
	Reyes; Velásquez; Escalante; Medina; Montenegro		Ortiz	Stadium: Estadio Tiburcio Carías Andino

21 September 1982	Olimpia	1–1	Motagua	Tegucigalpa
	Norales		Bennett	Stadium: Estadio Tiburcio Carías Andino

26 September 1982	Motagua	0–1	Real España	Tegucigalpa
				Stadium: Estadio Tiburcio Carías Andino

17 October 1982	Olimpia	0–0	Real España	Tegucigalpa
				Stadium: Estadio Tiburcio Carías Andino; Referee: Orestes Aguilar
Note: Match suspended at 85' (0–0) as Real España abandoned the field for not accepting a late penalty. Olimpia was awarded the win.

31 October 1982	Real España	2–1	Vida	San Pedro Sula
				Stadium: Estadio General Francisco Morazán

31 October 1982	Motagua	1–1	Olimpia	Tegucigalpa
	Reyes		Norales	Stadium: Estadio Tiburcio Carías Andino

7 November 1982	Motagua	1–1	Victoria	Tegucigalpa
				Stadium: Estadio Tiburcio Carías Andino

14 November 1982	Victoria	0–0	Olimpia

14 November 1982	Real España	1–1	Motagua	San Pedro Sula
				Stadium: Estadio General Francisco Morazán

Olimpia	1–1	Victoria

=== Unknown rounds ===
28 March 1982

Olimpia	4–0	Atlético Morazán

Tegucigalpa
25 April 1982

Independiente	0–3	Victoria
		Calero

San Pedro Sula
12 May 1982

Olimpia	1–1	Motagua

Tegucigalpa
19 May 1982

Real España	1–3	Victoria
Centeno		Girón; Lanza; Zúniga

San Pedro Sula
6 June 1982

Olimpia	5–2	Atlético Morazán
		Renderos

Tegucigalpa
18 July 1982

Real España	2–2	Independiente

San Pedro Sula
1 August 1982

Real España	5–1	Universidad

San Pedro Sula
8 August 1982

Marathón	–	Dandy
	Marathón didn't show up

San Pedro Sula
22 August 1982

Olimpia	–	Atlético Morazán

Tegucigalpa

Olimpia	0–0	Real España

Motagua	2–2	Marathón
Montenegro; Obando		Bernárdez; Carranza
