= 1997–98 Honduran Segunda División =

Honduran Segunda División
- Season: 1997–98
- Champions: Alianza
- Promoted: Alianza
- All statistics correct as of 5 April 1998.

The 1997–98 Honduran Segunda División was the 31st season of the Honduran Segunda División. Under the management of Alfonso Navarro, Alianza won the tournament after defeating C.D. Real Sociedad 3–2 on aggregate in the final series and gained promotion to the 1998–99 Honduran Liga Nacional.

== Final ==
1998 1st leg	Real Sociedad	2–0	Alianza	Tocoa, Colón
				Stadium: Estadio Francisco Martínez Durón

5 April 1998 2nd leg	Alianza	3–0	Real Sociedad	La Esperanza, Intibucá

- Alianza won 3–2 on aggregate.
- It is unclear how Broncos was promoted to 1998–99 Honduran Liga Nacional instead of Alianza.
