= 1994–95 Honduran Segunda División =

Honduran Segunda División
- Season: 1994–95
- Champions: Independiente Villela
- Promoted: Independiente Villela
- All statistics correct as of 27 May 1995.

The 1994–95 Honduran Segunda División was the 28th season of the Honduran Segunda División. Under the management of Carlos Tábora, Independiente Villela won the tournament after finishing first in the final round (or Octagonal) and obtained promotion to the 1995–96 Honduran Liga Nacional.

== Final round ==
Also known as Octagonal.

=== Standings ===
Pos	Team	Pld	W	D	L	GF	GA	GD	Pts	Promotion
1	Independiente Villela	0	0	0	0	0	0	0	0	Promotion to Liga Nacional
2	Nacional	0	0	0	0	0	0	0	0	
3	missing	0	0	0	0	0	0	0	0	
4	missing	0	0	0	0	0	0	0	0	
5	missing	0	0	0	0	0	0	0	0	
6	missing	0	0	0	0	0	0	0	0	
7	missing	0	0	0	0	0	0	0	0	
8	missing	0	0	0	0	0	0	0	0	

=== Known results ===
27 May 1995	Nacional	1–1	Independiente Villela	Siguatepeque, Comayagua
				Stadium: Estadio Roberto Martínez Ávila
