= Eduardo Bennett =

Honduran footballer and manager (born 1968)

Personal information
- Full name: José Eduardo Bennett
- Date of birth: September 11, 1968 (age 58)
- Place of birth: La Ceiba, Honduras
- Height: 1.79 m (5 ft 10 in)
- Position: Striker

Team information
- Current team: UPNFM

Youth career
- Victoria

Senior career*
Years	Team	Apps	(Gls)
1988–1990	Curacao		(12)
1991–1992	Olimpia		(24)
1991–1993	Cobras	31	(8)
1993–1995	San Lorenzo	47	(18)
1995–1999	Argentinos Juniors	111	(44)
2000	Cobreloa	28	(7)
2000	Argentinos Juniors	11	(2)
2001	Chacarita Juniors		
2001–2002	Quilmes		(6)
2002	Olimpia		(3)
2003–2004	Victoria	69	(34)
2005–2006	Vida		(8)
2006–2007	Unión Ájax		
2007	Olimpia	1	(0)
2008	Atlético Olanchano	16	(5)
2008–2010	Necaxa		

International career^{‡}
1991–2000	Honduras	36	(19)

Managerial career
- 2012: Necaxa (Reserves)
- 2013–: UPNFM
- * Club domestic league appearances and goals as of 30 July 2006 ‡ National team caps and goals as of 2005

José Eduardo Bennett (born 11 September 1968) is a Honduran former footballer. He is currently manager of UPNFM.

== Club career ==
Born in La Ceiba, Bennett played in the youth teams of local side Victoria and moved to Tegucigalpa aged 14. There he played college football and later joined Curacao. His debut in Liga Nacional was on 29 September 1988 at the age of 19 wearing Curacao's jersey against Motagua, and he scored to tie 1-1.

Nicknamed El Balín or Demonio (the Demon), he played for Curacao, CD Olimpia and CD Victoria in Honduras, Cobras in Mexico, Argentinos Juniors, San Lorenzo (with whom he won the 1995 Clausura title) and Second Division Chacarita Juniors and Quilmes in 10 years in Argentina as well as for Cobreloa in Chile.

His debut in Honduran Second Division was on February 4, 2007 at the age of 38 for Unión Ájax against Real Sociedad. By May 2009, he has scored 83 goals in the Honduran national league.

At age 41, Bennett retired after playing with Necaxa in the Honduran second division and started training the Necaxa reserves.

== International career ==
Bennett made his debut for Honduras in a May 1991 UNCAF Nations Cup match against Panama and has earned a total of 36 caps, scoring 19 goals. He has represented his country in 11 FIFA World Cup qualification matches and played at the 1991 UNCAF Nations Cup as well as at the 1991, 1993 and 1996 CONCACAF Gold Cups. He is the scorer of the first ever goal at a CONCACAF Gold Cup Finals.

He was substituted in his final international, an April 2000 FIFA World Cup qualification game against Panama.

== International goals ==
#	Date	Venue	Opponent	Score	Result	Competition
1.	28 June 1991	Los Angeles, United States	Canada	4-2	Win	1991 CONCACAF Gold Cup
2.	30 June 1991	Los Angeles, United States	Jamaica	5-0	Win	1991 CONCACAF Gold Cup
3.	5 July 1991	Los Angeles, United States	Costa Rica	2-0	Win	1991 CONCACAF Gold Cup
4.	28 June 1992	Tegucigalpa, Honduras	Panama	4-0	Win	Friendly
5.	28 June 1992	Tegucigalpa, Honduras	Panama	4-0	Win	Friendly
6.	28 June 1992	Tegucigalpa, Honduras	Panama	4-0	Win	Friendly
7.	28 June 1992	Tegucigalpa, Honduras	Panama	4-0	Win	Friendly
8.	8 July 1992	Tegucigalpa, Honduras	Colombia	1-0	Win	Friendly
9.	24 September 1992	San Pedro Sula, Honduras	Jamaica	2-0	Win	Friendly
10.	22 November 1992	Kingstown, Saint Vincent and the Grenadines	Saint Vincent and the Grenadines	4-0	Win	World Cup 1994 Qualifier
11.	25 April 1993	Tegucigalpa, Honduras	El Salvador	2-0	Win	World Cup 1994 Qualifier
12.	25 April 1993	Tegucigalpa, Honduras	El Salvador	2-0	Win	World Cup 1994 Qualifier
13.	10 July 1993	Dallas, United States	Panama	5-1	Win	1993 CONCACAF Gold Cup
14.	10 July 1993	Dallas, United States	Panama	5-1	Win	1993 CONCACAF Gold Cup
15.	10 July 1993	Dallas, United States	Panama	5-1	Win	1993 CONCACAF Gold Cup
16.	14 July 1993	Dallas, United States	Jamaica	3-1	Loss	1993 CONCACAF Gold Cup
17.	21 September 1996	San Pedro Sula, Honduras	Mexico	2-1	Win	World Cup 1998 Qualifier
18.	17 November 1996	San Pedro Sula, Honduras	Saint Vincent and the Grenadines	11-3	Win	World Cup 1998 Qualifier

== Titles ==
Season	Club	Title
Clausura 1995	San Lorenzo de Almagro	Primera Division Argentina Championship
