= 1985 Honduran Segunda División =

Honduran Segunda División
- Season: 1985–86
- Champions: E.A.C.I.
- Promoted: E.A.C.I.
- All statistics correct as of 22 December 1985.

The 1985 Honduran Segunda División was the 19th season of the Honduran Segunda División. Under the management of Rafael Núñez, E.A.C.I. won the tournament after finishing first in the final round (or Cuadrangular) and obtained promotion to the 1986–87 Honduran Liga Nacional.

== Final round ==
Also known as Cuadrangular.

=== Standings ===
| Pos | Team | Pld | W | D | L | GF | GA | GD | Pts | Promotion |
|---|---|---|---|---|---|---|---|---|---|---|
| 1 | E.A.C.I. | 0 | 0 | 0 | 0 | 0 | 0 | 0 | 0 | Promotion to Liga Nacional |
| 2 | Curacao | 0 | 0 | 0 | 0 | 0 | 0 | 0 | 0 | |
| 3 | missing | 0 | 0 | 0 | 0 | 0 | 0 | 0 | 0 | |
| 4 | missing | 0 | 0 | 0 | 0 | 0 | 0 | 0 | 0 | |

=== Known results ===
| 22 December 1985 | E.A.C.I. | 2–0 | Curacao | Sabá, Colón |
