= 1995–96 Honduran Liga Nacional =

Liga Nacional
- Season: 1995–96
- Champions: Olimpia (12th)
- Relegated: Broncos
- CONCACAF Champions' Cup: Olimpia; Real España
- Matches: 149
- Goals: 338 (2.27 per match)
- Top goalscorer: Castro (14)
- All statistics correct as of 26 May 1996.

The 1995–96 Honduran Liga Nacional season was the 30th edition of the Honduran Liga Nacional. The format of the tournament remained the same as the previous season. Club Deportivo Olimpia won the title after defeating Real C.D. España in the finals. Both teams qualified to the 1997 CONCACAF Champions' Cup.

== 1995–96 teams ==
- Broncos
- Independiente Villela (promoted)
- Marathón
- Motagua
- Olimpia
- Platense
- Real España
- Real Maya
- Victoria
- Vida

== Regular season ==
=== Standings ===
Pos	Team	Pld	W	D	L	GF	GA	GD	Pts	Qualification or relegation
1	Olimpia (Note: Olimpia secured Final spot.)	27	12	11	4	48	25	+23	47	Qualification for Final Round (Note: Top 6 qualify to Final round.)
2	Victoria	27	12	10	5	38	27	+11	46	Qualification for Final Round
3	Motagua	27	11	7	9	36	28	+8	40	Qualification for Final Round
4	Platense	27	10	7	10	29	31	−2	37	Qualification for Final Round
5	Marathón	27	9	9	9	32	31	+1	36	Qualification for Final Round
6	Real España	27	9	9	9	32	33	−1	36	Qualification for Final Round
7	Real Maya	27	6	14	7	27	27	0	32	
8	Vida	27	5	14	8	25	37	−12	29	
9	Independiente Villela	27	4	15	8	24	32	−8	27	
10	Broncos	27	3	12	12	19	39	−20	21	Relegation to Segunda División (Note: Broncos relegated to Segunda División.)

== Final round ==
=== Hexagonal ===
14 April 1996 1st leg	Platense	2–1	Motagua	Puerto Cortés, Cortés
	Craniotis; Piota		Castro	Stadium: Estadio Excélsior

18 April 1996 2nd leg	Motagua	2–0	Platense	Tegucigalpa, Francisco Morazán
	Castro; Guifarro			Stadium: Estadio Tiburcio Carías Andino

- Motagua won 3–2 on aggregated.

17 April 1996 1st leg	Real España	0–0	Olimpia	San Pedro Sula, Cortés
	Craniotis; Piota		Castro	Stadium: Estadio Francisco Morazán

21 April 1996 2nd leg	Olimpia	0–1 (a.e.t.)	Real España	Tegucigalpa, Francisco Morazán
			97' Castro	Stadium: Estadio Tiburcio Carías Andino; Attendance: ~22,000

- Real España won 1–0 on aggregated.

20 April 1996 1st leg	Marathón	0–0	Victoria	San Pedro Sula, Cortés
				Stadium: Estadio Francisco Morazán

April 1996 2nd leg	Victoria	2–0	Marathón	La Ceiba, Atlántida
				Stadium: Estadio Nilmo Edwards

- Victoria won 2–0 on aggregated.

=== Triangular ===
Pos	Team	Pld	W	D	L	GF	GA	GD	Pts	Qualification or relegation
1	Real España	4	2	0	2	7	6	+1	6	Qualification for Final (Note: Real España qualifies to the Final.)
2	Victoria	4	2	0	2	5	5	0	6	
3	Motagua	4	2	0	2	5	6	−1	6	

Notes:

April 1996	Real España	1–0	Victoria	San Pedro Sula, Cortés
				Stadium: Estadio Francisco Morazán

1 May 1996	Victoria	1–0	Motagua	La Ceiba, Atlántida
				Stadium: Estadio Nilmo Edwards

5 May 1996	Motagua	2–1	Real España	Tegucigalpa, Francisco Morazán
				Stadium: Estadio Tiburcio Carías Andino

May 1996	Victoria	3–2	Real España	La Ceiba, Atlántida
				Stadium: Estadio Nilmo Edwards

12 May 1996	Motagua	2–1	Victoria	Tegucigalpa, Francisco Morazán
				Stadium: Estadio Tiburcio Carías Andino

15 May 1996	Real España	3–1	Motagua	San Pedro Sula, Cortés
	Aplícano; Ruiz; Bonilla 90'		Sierra	Stadium: Estadio Francisco Morazán

=== Final ===
Played between winners of regular season and final round.

19 May 1996	Real España	0–3	Olimpia	San Pedro Sula, Cortés
			6' 79' Santamaría; 67' Arriola	Stadium: Estadio Francisco Morazán

26 May 1996	Olimpia	0–0	Real España	Tegucigalpa, Francisco Morazán
16:00 CST				Stadium: Estadio Tiburcio Carías Andino; Attendance: 30,500

Olimpia	Real España

GK	–	(Argentina) Carlos Prono
RB	–	(Honduras) Norberto Martínez
CB	–	(Honduras) Samuel Caballero
CB	–	(Honduras) Merlyn Membreño
LB	–	(Honduras) ??
CM	–	(Honduras) Juan Carlos Espinoza
RM	–	(Honduras) Nahúm Espinoza
LM	–	(Honduras) Christian Santamaría
AM	–	(Honduras) Alex Pineda Chacón
CF	–	(Honduras) Eduardo Arriola
CF	–	(Honduras) Marlon Hernández
Substitutions:
DF	–	(Honduras) ??
MF	–	(Honduras) ??
FW	–	(Honduras) ??
Manager:
(Honduras) José Herrera

GK	–	(Honduras) Milton Flores
RB	–	(Honduras) César Clother
CB	–	(Honduras) José Luis López
CB	–	(Honduras) Walter Aplícano
LB	–	(Honduras) Leonardo Morales
DM	–	(Honduras) Mauricio Fúnez
DM	–	(Honduras) Javier Rodríguez
RM	–	(Honduras) Washington Hernández
LM	–	(Honduras) Richardson Smith
AM	–	(Honduras) Gustavo Gallegos
CF	–	(Honduras) Orvin Cabrera
Substitutions:
DF	–	(Honduras) ??
MF	–	(Honduras) ??
FW	–	(Honduras) ??
Manager:
(Uruguay) Héctor Hugo Eugui

- Olimpia won 3–0 on aggregated.

== Top scorer ==
- (Honduras) Geovanny Castro (Motagua) with 14 goals

== Squads ==
Broncos
(Honduras) Fidel Mejía	(Honduras) José Luis "Pili" Aguirre	(El Salvador) Carlos Coreas
(Paraguay) Julio César Chávez
Independiente Villela
(Uruguay) Enrique Daniel Uberti García	(Honduras) Mauricio Edgardo Figueroa	(Honduras) Edgardo Emilson Soto Fajardo
(Brazil) Adalto Da Silva	(Uruguay) Julio César Pereira	(Uruguay) Washington Rodríguez
(Costa Rica) Pedro Cubillo
Marathón
(Honduras) Dangelo Daltino Bautista	(Brazil) José Cristiano Pinheiro de Araujo	(Honduras) Walter "Gualala" Trejo
(Honduras) José Ulloa Villatoro	(Honduras) Antonio Rudón Arita	(Honduras) Pompilio Cacho Valerio
(Honduras) Edwin Alexander Medina	(Brazil) Julio César Santos	(Honduras) Jorge Ferdín
(Honduras) Wilmer Andrés Roque	(Honduras) Carlos Aragón	(Honduras) Víctor Coello
(Brazil) Jurandir de Jesús Damascena	(Honduras) Luis Orlando "El Chinito" Reyes Santos	(Honduras) José Erasmo "Urco" Crisanto Castillo
(Honduras) Marco Vinicio "Chacal" Ortega	(Honduras) César Adonis Flores	(Honduras) Behiker Bustillo
(Honduras) Ciro Paulino "Palic" Castillo	(Brazil) Octavio Santana	(Honduras) Mario Beata
Motagua
(Honduras) Wilmer Enrique "Supermán" Cruz	(Honduras) Giovanni "Venado" Castro	(Honduras) Ramón "Romerito" Romero
(Honduras) Mario Chirinos	(Colombia) Oscar Valencia	(Honduras) Edgar Sierra
(Brazil) Denilson Costa de Oliveira	(Honduras) Víctor Sebastián Zúniga	(Honduras) Marco Antonio Anariba Zelaya
(Brazil) Paulo César de Oliveira	(Peru) David Wendell
Olimpia
(Honduras) Gustavo Cálix	(Argentina) Carlos Enrique Prono	(Honduras) Nahúm Alberto Espinoza Zerón
(Honduras) Eduardo Arriola	(Honduras) Christian Santamaría	(Honduras) Merlyn Membreño
(Honduras) Juan Carlos Espinoza	(Honduras) Norberto Martinez	(Uruguay) Carlos José Laje Moreno
(Honduras) Eugenio Dolmo Flores	(Honduras) Danilo "Pollo" Galindo	(Honduras) Jorge Samuel Caballero
(Honduras) Marlon "Pitufo" Hernández	(Honduras) Alex Pineda Chacón	(Ecuador) John Bermeo
Platense
(Honduras) Óscar René Contreras	(Honduras) Marco Antonio Mejía	(Honduras) Jorge Arita Neals
(Honduras) Erick Jerezano Jackson	(Honduras) Alexis Iván Duarte	(Honduras) José Luis "Runga" Piota
(Panama) Franklin Delgado	(Panama) Ricardo James	(Panama) Fernando Bolívar
(Panama) Ferdín Sánchez Samaniego	(Argentina) Sergio Díaz	(Argentina) Carlos Bechtoldt
Real España
(Honduras) Luis Antonio López	(Honduras) Erick Villanueva	(Honduras) José Mauricio "Guicho" Fúnez Barrientos
(Honduras) Gustavo Adolfo Gallegos	(Honduras) Walter Lagos Aplícano	(Honduras) Camilo Bonilla
(Honduras) José "Picardía" Padilla	(Honduras) Marlon Javier Monge	(Honduras) Víctor Martín Castro
(Honduras) Edgar Antonio Figueroa	(Honduras) Luis Orlando "Caralampio" Vallejo Arguijo	(Honduras) Miguel Ángel "Gallo" Mariano
(Honduras) Jaime Ruiz	(Honduras) José Luis López	(Honduras) César Clother
(Uruguay) Víctor de los Santos	(Honduras) Edward "Güicho" Barahona	(Honduras) Raúl Dolmo
(Uruguay) Washington Leonardo "Piojo" Hernández	(Honduras) Milton "Chocolate" Flores
Real Maya
(Honduras) Nelson Rolando Rosales	(Honduras) Edgardo Geovany "Yura" Róchez	(Argentina) Gustavo Ochoa
(Costa Rica) Francisco Acuña
Victoria
(Honduras) Raúl Martínez Sambulá	(Honduras) Enrique Reneau	(Honduras) César Castro
(Honduras) Renán "Chimbo" Aguilera Contreras	(Costa Rica) Floyd Guthrie	(Panama) Pércival Piggott
(Uruguay) Álvaro Izquierdo
Vida
(Honduras) Marvin Geovany "Mango" Henríquez	(Honduras) Rossel Cacho	(Paraguay) Irineo Núñez
(Honduras) Clayd Lester Marson	(Honduras) Nigel Zúniga	(Honduras) Carlos Monchín Rodríguez
(Honduras) Raúl Centeno Gamboa	(Honduras) René Arturo David "Pupa" Martínez	(Honduras) Dennis Antonio Piedy
(Honduras) Jorge Ernesto Pineda	(Honduras) Carlos Matamoros	(Honduras) Pablo Valencia

== Known results ==
=== Round 1 ===
Marathón	2–2	Real Maya
Castillo

San Pedro Sula

=== Unknown rounds ===
17 September 1995

Platense	1–0	Real España

Puerto Cortés
Referee: Óscar Javier Bardales
20 September 1995

Olimpia	0–0	Vida

Tegucigalpa
24 September 1995

Real Maya	1–1	Olimpia
Rosa

Siguatepeque
24 September 1995

Vida	1–0	Independiente

La Ceiba
30 September 1995

Real España	2–1	Independiente

San Pedro Sula
22 October 1995

Olimpia	1–1	Independiente

Tegucigalpa
Referee: Óscar Leónidas Díaz
4 November 1995

Real España	3–2	Olimpia
Pavón

San Pedro Sula
5 November 1995

Broncos	3–2	Independiente
		Uberti

Choluteca
11 November 1995

Independiente	1–1	Marathón

San Pedro Sula
26 November 1995

Real Maya	1–2	Marathón

Siguatepeque
2 December 1995

Marathón	0–0	Broncos

San Pedro Sula
4 December 1995

Real España	–	Olimpia

San Pedro Sula
8 December 1995

Motagua	3–1	Vida

Tegucigalpa
10 December 1995

Victoria	3–1	Real Maya
Benguché; Izquierdo; Centeno		Lagos

La Ceiba
Attendance: 1,603
6 January 1996

Independiente	0–1	Olimpia
		Espinoza

San Pedro Sula
21 January 1996

Olimpia	7–0	Real España
M. Hernández; Flores

Tegucigalpa
4 February 1996

Platense	1–0	Real España

Puerto Cortés
25 February 1996

Broncos	2–0	Vida

Choluteca
26 February 1996

Motagua	0–2	Real España

Tegucigalpa
17 March 1996

Vida	0–5	Real España

La Ceiba

Motagua	3–1	Platense
