= 1981–82 Honduran Liga Nacional =

Liga Nacional
- Season: 1981–82
- Champions: Vida (1st)
- Relegated: Platense; Universidad
- CONCACAF Champions' Cup: Vida
- Copa Fraternidad: Vida; Atlético Morazán; Marathón; Real España
- Matches: 173
- Goals: 405 (2.34 per match)
- Top goalscorer: Altamirano (15)
- All statistics correct as of 28 October 1981.

The 1981–82 Honduran Liga Nacional season was the 16th edition of the Honduran Liga Nacional. The format of the tournament remained the same as the previous season. C.D.S. Vida won the title after defeating Atlético Morazán in the finals and qualified to the 1982 CONCACAF Champions' Cup. Additionally, Vida, Atlético Morazán, C.D. Marathón and Real C.D. España obtained berths to the 1982 Copa Fraternidad.

== 1981–82 teams ==
- Atlético Morazán (Tegucigalpa)
- Broncos (Choluteca)
- Independiente (San Pedro Sula, promoted)
- Marathón (San Pedro Sula)
- Motagua (Tegucigalpa)
- Olimpia (Tegucigalpa)
- Platense (Puerto Cortés)
- Real España (San Pedro Sula)
- Universidad (Tegucigalpa)
- Victoria (La Ceiba)
- Vida (La Ceiba)

== Regular season ==
=== Standings ===
Pos	Team	Pld	W	D	L	GF	GA	GD	Pts	Qualification or relegation
1	Atlético Morazán (Note: Atlético Morazán secured Final place as Regular season winner.)	30	14	11	5	39	28	+11	39	Qualified to the Final round (Note: Top 5 qualify to Final round.)
2	Motagua	30	15	8	7	35	25	+10	38	Qualified to the Final round
3	Vida	30	14	10	6	32	26	+6	38	Qualified to the Final round
4	Marathón	30	10	13	7	41	31	+10	33	Qualified to the Final round
5	Broncos	30	13	6	11	36	32	+4	32	Qualified to the Final round
6	Real España	30	10	11	9	38	36	+2	31	
7	Olimpia	30	9	9	12	32	35	−3	27	
8	Victoria	30	8	10	12	33	43	−10	26	
9	Independiente	30	6	13	11	34	41	−7	25	
10	Universidad	30	6	11	13	21	26	−5	23	Relegated to Segunda División (Note: Universidad and Platense relegated to second division.)
11	Platense	30	4	10	16	26	44	−18	18	Relegated to Segunda División

== Final round ==
=== Pentagonal standings ===
Pos	Team	Pld	W	D	L	GF	GA	GD	Pts	Qualification or relegation
1	Motagua	8	4	3	1	14	7	+7	11 (Note: The game between Broncos and Motagua in Choluteca on 11 October was awarded to Motagua as Broncos didn't show up.)	Forced to a replay (Note: Motagua and Vida had to play an extra match in a neutral venue to qualify to the Final.)
2	Vida	8	3	5	0	11	7	+4	11	Forced to a replay
3	Marathón	8	2	5	1	5	5	0	9	
4	Broncos	8	0	6	2	0	1	−1	6	
5	Atlético Morazán	8	0	3	5	2	12	−10	3	

=== Replay ===
18 October 1981 Replay	Motagua	0–1	Vida	San Pedro Sula, Cortés
15:00			31' Mendoza	Stadium: Estadio Francisco Morazán

- Vida won Replay and advanced to the Final.

=== Final ===
25 October 1981 1st leg	Atlético Morazán	1–3	Vida	San Pedro Sula, Cortés
	Velásquez		Lacayo; Mendoza; Carías	Stadium: Estadio Francisco Morazán; Attendance: 9,000; Referee: Rodolfo Martínez

28 October 1981 2nd leg	Vida	1–0	Atlético Morazán	La Ceiba, Atlántida
	Mendoza 67' (pen.)			Stadium: Estadio Nilmo Edwards; Attendance: 7,965; Referee: Jorge Irías

- Vida won 4–1 on aggregated score.

== Top scorer ==
- (Argentina) Luis O. Altamirano (Broncos) with 15 goals

== Squads ==
Atlético Morazán
(Honduras) Moisés "Tanque" Velásquez	(Honduras) Francisco "Pancho" González	(Honduras) José Estanislao "Tanayo" Ortega
(Chile) Joaquín Arrastoa	(Honduras) José Luis Cruz Figueroa	(Chile) Julio del Carmen Tapia Callao
(Honduras) Noel Omar Renderos
Broncos
(Argentina) Luis Oswaldo "Che" Altamirano	(Honduras) José Marcial "Canelo" Murillo	(Honduras) Cruz Ramón Serrano "Guaya" Cruz
Independiente de San Pedro Sula
(Honduras) José Mauricio Fúnez Barrientos	(Honduras) Jorge Martínez	(Honduras) Felipe "Nicio" Rivera
(Honduras) Roberto Herrera Moreno	(Honduras) Marco Antonio "Gato" Pavón Molina	(Honduras) Alberto Perich
(Honduras) José Ramón Hinds	(Honduras) Rodolfo "Mirandinha" Smith
Marathón
(Uruguay) Albert Fay	(Honduras) Darío Cribas	(Honduras) Hernán Santiago "Cortés" García Martínez
(Honduras) Oswaldo Zaldívar	(Honduras) Arturo Payne	(Honduras) José Angel Peña
(Honduras) Herminio Villalobos	(Honduras) Arturo Torres "Pacharaca" Bonilla	(Honduras) Jorge Alberto "Cuca" Bueso Iglesias
(Honduras) Celso Fredy Güity	(Honduras) Roberto Reynaldo "Robot" Bailey Sargent	(Honduras) Carlos Mejía
(Honduras) Gilberto Leonel Machado García	(Honduras) Francisco Javier Toledo
Motagua
(Honduras) Alcides Morales	(Chile) Mario Hernán Juviny Carreño	(Honduras) Héctor Ramón Chávez
(Honduras) Luis Alberto "Chito" Reyes	(Honduras) José María "Chema" Durón	(Honduras) Héctor Ramón "Pecho de Aguila" Zelaya
Olimpia
(Honduras) Belarmino Rivera	(Honduras) Óscar Banegas	(Costa Rica) Carlos Solano
(Honduras) Félix Concepción Carranza	(Honduras) Ramón Antonio "Pilín" Brand	(Honduras) Carlos Solís
(Honduras) Jorge Alberto "Perro" González	(Honduras) Jorge Brand	(Brazil) Nelson de Moraes
(Honduras) Richard Kenneth Payne
Platense
(Honduras) Modesto Ayestas	(El Salvador) Luis Baltazar Ramírez "Pelé" Zapata	(Honduras) Juan Jerezano
(Honduras) Carlos Roberto Deras	(Honduras) Jorge Luis Mancía	(Honduras) Armando López "Babalaba" Bodden
(Honduras) Ramón Cruz Colindres	(Honduras) Alex Rodríguez
Real España
(Honduras) Julio César "El Tile" Arzú	(Costa Rica) Didier Gutiérrez	(Honduras) Hernán Zelaya
(Honduras) Carlos Saúl Bonilla	(Honduras) Junior Rashford Costly	(Honduras) Julio Roberto "Chino" Ortiz
(Honduras) Miguel Antonio "Hino" Mathews	(Honduras) Walter Humberto Jimminson Warren	(Honduras) Javier Chavarría
(Honduras) Antonio "Gato" Pavón Molina	(Honduras) Jimmy Steward	(Honduras) Edith Hernando Contreras
(Honduras) Carlos Orlando Caballero	(Honduras) Héctor "Lin" Zelaya	(Honduras) Efraín Pucho Osorio
Universidad
(Honduras) Daniel "Diablo" Sambulá	(Brazil) Edimar Luiz Marques	(Honduras) José Salomón "Turco" Nazzar
Victoria
(Honduras) Jorge Alberto "Camioncito" Duarte	(Honduras) Luis Alonso "Chorompo" Zúniga	(Honduras) José Reynaldo Villagra
(Honduras) Miguel Angel "Primitivo" Ortiz	(Honduras) Efraín Martínez "Diablillo" Amaya	(Honduras) David Goff
Vida
(Honduras) Marvin Geovany "Mango" Henríquez	(Honduras) Martín Lacayo	(Honduras) Gustavo Adolfo "Gorcha" Collins
(Honduras) Natividad Morales Barrios	(Honduras) Carlos Humberto "Papeto" Lobo	(Honduras) Matilde Selím Lacayo
(Honduras) Junior Mejía	(Honduras) José Enrique "Palanca" Mendoza	(Honduras) Jesús Carías
(Honduras) Dennis "Bomba" Hinds	(Honduras) Ramón Nectaly "Liebre" Guardado	(Honduras) Juan Dolmo "Juanito" Arzú
(Honduras) Roberto "Macho" Figueroa

== Trivia ==
- There was a total of 405 goals this season, a record still unbeaten.

== Known results ==
=== Week 1 ===
Real España	1–0	Victoria	San Pedro Sula
Chavarría			Stadium: Estadio Francisco Morazán

Motagua	1–0	Platense	Tegucigalpa
			Stadium: Estadio Tiburcio Carías Andino

=== Week 2 ===
Platense	1–2	Broncos

=== Week 3 ===
Platense	3–3	Vida

=== Week 4 ===
Independiente	1–1	Platense	San Pedro Sula
			Stadium: Estadio Francisco Morazán

=== Week 5 ===
Real España	1–1	Platense	San Pedro Sula
			Stadium: Estadio Francisco Morazán

=== Week 6 ===
Platense	0–1	Victoria

=== Week 7 ===
Marathón	1–1	Platense	San Pedro Sula
			Stadium: Estadio Francisco Morazán

=== Week 29 ===
2 August 1981	Atlético Morazán	2–0	Platense	Tegucigalpa
				Stadium: Estadio Tiburcio Carías Andino

=== Pentagonal ===
2 September 1981	Motagua	1–1	Marathón	Tegucigalpa
	Durón		Villalobos	Stadium: Estadio Tiburcio Carías Andino

13 September 1981	Motagua	2–0	Atlético Morazán	Tegucigalpa
	Velásquez; Yubini			Stadium: Estadio Tiburcio Carías Andino

11 October 1981	Broncos	v	Motagua	Choluteca
				Stadium: Estadio Fausto Flores Lagos
Note: Broncos didn't show up. Points awarded to Motagua

15 October 1981	Marathón	1–3	Motagua	San Pedro Sula
	Bailey		Juviny; Guardado; Januario	Stadium: Estadio Francisco Morazán

=== Regular season ===
15 February 1981	Olimpia	0–0	Independiente	Tegucigalpa
				Stadium: Estadio Tiburcio Carías Andino

22 February 1981	Marathón	3–2	Real España	San Pedro Sula
				Stadium: Estadio Francisco Morazán

15 March 1981	Broncos	1–0	Motagua	Choluteca
				Stadium: Estadio Fausto Flores Lagos

29 April 1981	Marathón	4–0	Motagua	San Pedro Sula
	Güity; Zaldívar; Bailey			Stadium: Estadio Francisco Morazán

6 May 1981	Marathón	5–1	Victoria	San Pedro Sula
				Stadium: Estadio Francisco Morazán

6 May 1981	Real España	2–2	Platense	San Pedro Sula
				Stadium: Estadio Francisco Morazán

6 May 1981	Broncos	4–3	Independiente	Tegucigalpa
				Stadium: Estadio Tiburcio Carías Andino

6 May 1981	Motagua	3–2	Atlético Morazán	Tegucigalpa
				Stadium: Estadio Tiburcio Carías Andino

10 May 1981	Broncos	2–0	Motagua	Choluteca
				Stadium: Estadio Fausto Flores Lagos

1 July 1981	Marathón	2–1	Olimpia	San Pedro Sula
	Bailey; Güity		Alvarado	Stadium: Estadio General Francisco Morazán; Referee: Arnold Moeses
Note: Match suspended at 75' (2–1) as Olimpia abandoned the field after the referee disallowed a goal from Carlos Solano. Result stood.

5 July 1981	Olimpia	2–3	Atlético Morazán	Tegucigalpa
			Renderos	Stadium: Estadio Tiburcio Carías Andino

22 July 1981	Independiente	2–0	Real España	San Pedro Sula
				Stadium: Estadio Francisco Morazán

22 July 1981	Marathón	1–1	Vida	San Pedro Sula
				Stadium: Estadio Francisco Morazán

2 August 1981	Motagua	1–0	Real España	Tegucigalpa
	Obando			Stadium: Estadio Tiburcio Carías Andino

9 August 1981	Olimpia	2–1	Universidad	Tegucigalpa
				Stadium: Estadio Tiburcio Carías Andino

Motagua	2–0	Olimpia	Tegucigalpa
Obando; Yanuario			Stadium: Estadio Tiburcio Carías Andino

Motagua	2–1	Olimpia	Tegucigalpa
Obando			Stadium: Estadio Tiburcio Carías Andino

=== Unknown rounds ===
Vida	3–2	Motagua	La Ceiba
			Stadium: Estadio Nilmo Edwards
