= C.D. Dandy =

Dandy
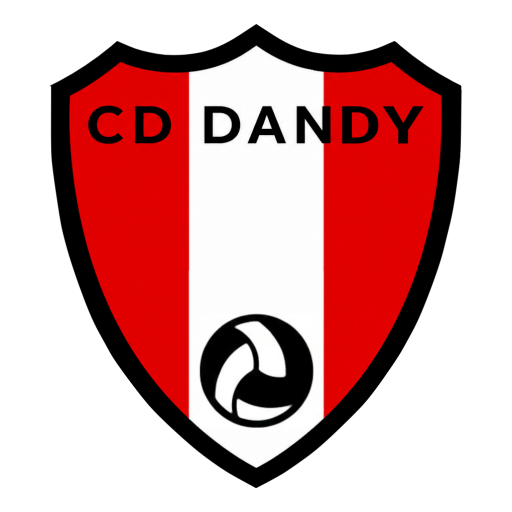
- Full name: Club Deportivo Dandy
- Nickname: Catrines
- Ground: Estadio Francisco Morazán, San Pedro Sula
- Capacity: 20,000
- 1983–84: 10th
Home colours	Away colours

Club Deportivo Dandy was a Honduran football club that played in the Honduran Liga Nacional from 1982–83 to 1983–84, season in which they were relegated to the Second Division after finishing bottom with 27 points.

They played their home games at Estadio Francisco Morazán and were nicknamed los Catrines.

== Achievements ==
- Segunda División

Winners (1): 1981

== League performance ==
Regular season										Post season								
Season	Pos	Pld	W	D	L	F	A	GD	Pts	Pos	Pld	W	D	L	F	A	GD	Pts
1982–83	7th	27	6	14	7	20	22	−2	26	Did not enter								
1983–84	10th	36	6	15	15	22	35	−13	27	Did not enter								
