= 1982 Honduran Segunda División =

Honduran Segunda División
- Season: 1982–83
- Champions: Platense
- Promoted: Platense
- All statistics correct as of 19 December 1982.

The 1982 Honduran Segunda División was the 16th season of the Honduran Segunda División. Under the management of Néstor Matamala, C.D. Platense won the tournament after finishing first in the final round (or Cuadrangular) and obtained promotion to the 1983–84 Honduran Liga Nacional.

== Final round ==
Also known as Cuadrangular.

=== Standings ===
Pos	Team	Pld	W	D	L	GF	GA	GD	Pts	Promotion
1	Platense	0	0	0	0	0	0	0	0	Promotion to Liga Nacional
2	Curacao	0	0	0	0	0	0	0	0	
3	missing	0	0	0	0	0	0	0	0	
4	missing	0	0	0	0	0	0	0	0	

=== Known results ===
19 December 1982	Curacao	1–1	Platense	Tegucigalpa, Francisco Morazán
				Stadium: Estadio Tiburcio Carías Andino
