= 2002–03 Honduran Liga Nacional de Ascenso =

Liga de Ascenso
- Season: 2002–03
- Champions: Atlético Olanchano
- Promoted: Atlético Olanchano
- All statistics correct as of 30 March 2003.

The 2002–03 Honduran Liga Nacional de Ascenso was the 36th season of the Second level in Honduran football and the first one under the name Liga Nacional de Ascenso. Under the management of Carlos Martínez, Atlético Olanchano won the tournament after defeating Deportes Savio in the final series and obtained promotion to the 2003–04 Honduran Liga Nacional.

== Final ==
March 2003 1st leg	Atlético Olanchano	1–0	Deportes Savio	Catacamas, Olancho
	Goal			Stadium: Estadio Rubén Guifarro

30 March 2003 2nd leg	Deportes Savio	1–1	Atlético Olanchano	Santa Rosa de Copán, Copán
	Goal		Goal	Stadium: Estadio Sergio Antonio Reyes

- Atlético Olanchano won 2–1 on aggregated.
