= C.D. Curacao =

Honduran football club

Curacao
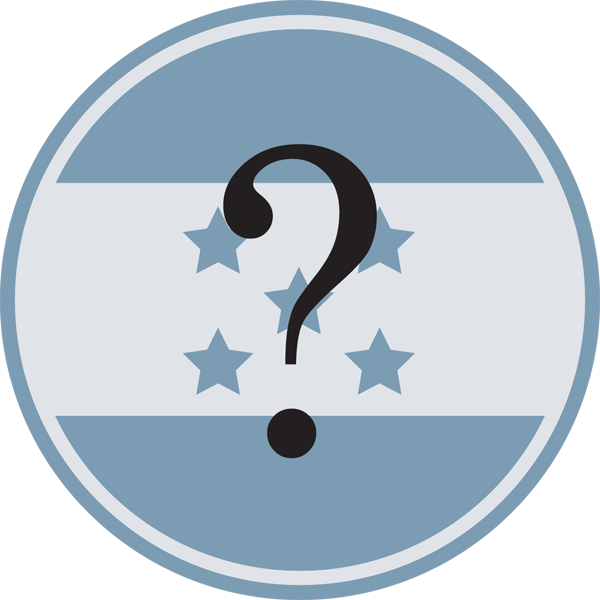
- Full name: Club Deportivo Curacao
- Ground: Estadio Tiburcio Carías Andino, Tegucigalpa
- Capacity: 35,000
- 1989–90: 10th
Home colours	Away colours	Third colours

Club Deportivo Curacao was a Honduran football club that played in the Honduran Liga Nacional from 1988–89 to 1989–90.

They played their home games at Estadio Tiburcio Carías Andino.

== Achievements ==
- Segunda División

Winners (1): 1987–88
Runners-up (4): 1976, 1980, 1982, 1985

== League performance ==
Regular season										Post season								
Season	Pos	Pld	W	D	L	F	A	GD	Pts	Pos	Pld	W	D	L	F	A	GD	Pts
1988–89	8th	27	5	13	9	21	31	−10	23	Did not enter								
1989–90	10th	27	5	11	11	22	37	−15	21	R	2	0	1	1	2	3	−1	1

=== Top scorers ===
- (Honduras) Eduardo Bennett (13)
- (Honduras) Carlos Humberto Lobo (12)
- (Honduras) Francisco "Pancho" Gonzalez ( )
