= 1996–97 Honduran Segunda División =

Honduran Segunda División
- Season: 1996–97
- Champions: Atlético Indio
- Promoted: Atlético Indio
- All statistics correct as of 18 April 1997.

The 1996–97 Honduran Segunda División was the 30th season of the Honduran Segunda División. Under the management of Mario Sandoval, Atlético Indio won the tournament after defeating Halcón Terrazos in the final series and obtained promotion to the 1997–98 Honduran Liga Nacional.

== Final ==
April 1997 1st leg	Halcón Terrazos	1–1	Atlético Indio

18 April 1997 2nd leg	Atlético Indio	2–0	Halcón Terrazos	Tegucigalpa, Francisco Morazán
				Stadium: Estadio Tiburcio Carías Andino

- Atlético Indio won 3–1 on aggregate.
- It is unclear how Palestino was promoted to 1997–98 Honduran Liga Nacional instead of Atlético Indio.
