= C.D. Petrotela =

Honduran football team

Petrotela
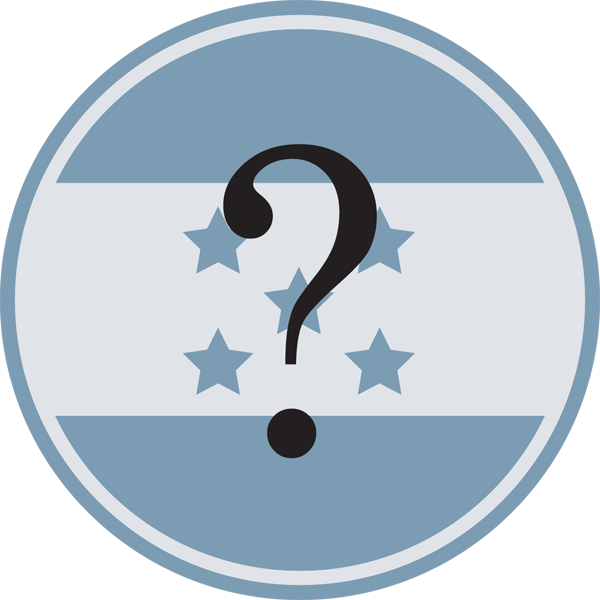
- Full name: Club Deportivo Petrotela
- Nickname(s): Petroleros
- Ground: Estadio León Gómez; Tela, Atlántida
- Capacity: 3,000
Home colours	Away colours	Third colours

Club Deportivo Petrotela was a Honduran football team based in Tela, Atlántida.

== History ==
=== Tela Timsa ===
They played in the top division in Honduran football for the first time in the 1985–86 season using the name of Tela Timsa. The club was relegated one year later and returned in 1990–91.

One season later Henry Arévalo, a business man, bought the club's franchise and changed its name to Petrotela, obtaining the second place that same year. However they were relegated again next season as most of their games were played at other team's soil.

== Achievements ==
- Liga Nacional

Runners-up (1): 1992–93

- Segunda División

Winners (2): 1984, 1989–90
Runners-up (1): 1987–88

== League performance ==
Regular season											Post season								
Season	Pos	P	W	D	L	F	A	PTS	+/-	Ded.	Pos	P	W	D	L	F	A	PTS	+/-
1985–86	9th	18	5	4	9	12	20	14	-8	–	Saved	2	1	1	0	1	0	3	+1
1986–87	10th	27	5	10	12	20	31	20	-11	–	Didn't enter								
1990–91	8th	27	7	7	13	19	34	21	-15	–	Didn't enter								
1991–92	8th	27	5	14	8	23	35	24	-12	–	Didn't enter								
1992–93	2nd	27	14	8	5	34	20	36	+14	–	4th	8	1	3	4	6	10	5	-4

- From 1985–86 to 1990–91 as Tela Timsa.
- From 1991–92 to 1993–94 as Petrotela.

== Coaches ==
- (Uruguay) Julio Gonzalez (1992)
