= Atlético Independiente =

Honduran football club

- Full name: Club Atlético Independiente
- Nickname(s): Las Panteras Negras
- Founded: 12 October 1960; 64 years ago
- Ground: Estadio Roberto Martínez Ávila; Siguatepeque, Honduras
- Capacity: 7,000
- League: Liga de Ascenso Honduras
Home colours	Away colours

Atlético Independiente is a Honduran soccer club based in Siguatepeque, Honduras. The club currently plays in Liga de Ascenso de Honduras.

== History ==
Club Atlético Independiente was founded on October 12, 1960, by Luis Méndez and Julio Zepeda. The club originally played in Liga de Fútbol “Amado Sánchez”, an independent league in Siguatepeque, until 1979, when the club was promoted to Segunda Division (now called Liga de Ascenso).

Since 1979, Atlético Independiente has been one of the most known and respected clubs in Liga de Ascenso. The club has come close to being promoted to Liga Nacional de Honduras on many occasions, the closest being in 1990, where it lost a playoff game for the final to Tela Timsa. Until 2017, they were the only team to play in every Liga de Ascenso season. They were relegated to Honduran Liga Mayor in June 2017 as they didn't show up at the last game for the No relegation match against Estrella Roja, thus losing the category automatically.

== Achievements ==
- Segunda División / Liga de Ascenso

Runners-up (1): 1984, 1995–96, 2009–10 C, 2014–15 C
