= 1983 Honduran Segunda División =

Honduran Segunda División
- Season: 1983–84
- Champions: Sula
- Promoted: Sula
- All statistics correct as of 22 December 1983.

The 1983 Honduran Segunda División was the 17th season of the Honduran Segunda División. Under the management of Roberto Norales, Sula de La Lima won the tournament after finishing first in the final round (or Cuadrangular) and obtained promotion to the 1984–85 Honduran Liga Nacional.

== Final round ==
Also known as Cuadrangular.

=== Standings ===
Pos	Team	Pld	W	D	L	GF	GA	GD	Pts	Promotion
1	Sula	0	0	0	0	0	0	0	0	Promotion to Liga Nacional
2	Independiente Villela	0	0	0	0	0	0	0	0	
3	missing	0	0	0	0	0	0	0	0	
4	missing	0	0	0	0	0	0	0	0	

=== Known results ===
22 December 1983	Independiente Villela	0–3	Sula	San Pedro Sula, Cortés
				Stadium: Estadio Francisco Morazán
