= Real Maya =

- Full name: Real Maya Deportivo
- Nickname(s): Los Militares
- Founded: 7 April 1985; 39 years ago
- Dissolved: 2004
- Ground: Estadio Marcelo Tinoco, Danlí, Honduras
- Capacity: 5,000
Home colours	Away colours	Third colours

Real Maya was a Honduran football club.

== History ==
The club was founded on 7 April 1985. They played in first division many season with many different names, Real Maya being the most used. In the 2002/2003 season they took the place of Real Comayagua.

=== Real Patepluma ===
They were named Real Patepluma and moved to Santa Bárbara for their final two seasons in the top tier of Honduran football before being excluded from the league.

== Achievements ==
- Segunda División

Winners (2): 1991–92, 2000–01

- Honduran Cup

Winners (1): 1993
Runners-up (1): 1994

- CONCACAF Cup Winners Cup

3rd Place (1): 1994

== League performance ==
Regular season											Post season								
Season	Pos	P	W	D	L	F	A	PTS	+/-	Ded.	Pos	P	W	D	L	F	A	PTS	+/-
1992–93	8th	27	8	10	9	37	34	26	+3	–	Did not enter								
1993–94	7th	27	7	11	9	19	20	25	-1	–	Did not enter								
1994–95	4th	27	9	10	8	28	24	37	+4	–	5th	2	1	0	1	3	4	3	-1
1995–96	7th	27	6	14	7	27	27	32	0	–	Did not enter								
1996–97	9th	27	5	11	11	20	27	26	-7	–	Did not enter								
1997–98 A	9th	20	4	6	10	25	29	18	-4	–	Did not enter								
1997–98 C	5th	20	8	4	8	26	27	28	-1	–	6th	2	0	1	1	2	5	1	-3
1998–99	10th	18	2	9	7	12	19	15	-7	–	Did not enter								
2002–03 A	9th	18	0	10	8	11	31	10	-20	+4	Did not enter								
2002–03 C	9th	18	3	6	9	11	18	15	-7	–	Did not enter								
2003–04 A	10th	18	2	4	12	15	40	10	-25	–	Did not enter								

- Relegated on 1998–99.
- As Real Patepluma on 2002–03 Clausura and 2003–04 Apertura.
