= Broncos del Sur F.C. =

Honduran football club

Broncos
- Full name: Club Deportivo Broncos
- Nickname(s): Los Potros (The Colts)
- Ground: Estadio Fausto Flores Lagos; Choluteca, Honduras
- Capacity: 8,000
- League: Honduran Liga Nacional
Home colours	Away colours	Third colours

Club Deportivo Broncos was a Honduran football club based in Choluteca, Honduras.

== History ==
The club bought C.D. Verdún's franchise in 1972–73. Verdún itself had taken over the Atlético Español franchise in 1971.

Due to financial problems, the club sold its franchise to Universidad and became Broncos UNAH after the 1981–82 season and later just Universidad. They closed operations after their relegation in 2001.

== Achievements ==
- Segunda División
  - Winners (1): 1993–94
  - Runners-up (1): 1968–69
- Copa Fraternidad
  - Winners (1): 1980

== League performance ==
Regular season										Post season								
Season	Pos	P	W	D	L	F	A	PTS	+/-	Pos	P	W	D	L	F	A	PTS	+/-
1972–73	7th	9	2	3	4	6	9	7	-3	No post season this year								
1973–74	9th	27	6	6	15	27	51	18	-24	No post season this year								
1974–75	6th	36	11	12	13	28	31	48	-3	Did not enter								
1975–76	6th	27	10	9	8	27	24	29	+3	Did not enter								
1976–77	9th	27	4	11	12	19	36	19	-17	Did not enter								
1977–78	6th	27	8	12	7	26	24	28	+2	6th	1	0	1	0	0	0	1	0
1978–79	6th	27	5	16	6	17	19	26	-2	4th	9	2	4	3	12	14	8(+2)	-2
1979–80	3rd	27	11	8	8	32	27	30	+5	4th	8	2	3	3	8	11	7	-3
1980–81	8th	27	6	11	10	28	30	23	-2	Did not enter								
1981–82	5th	30	13	6	11	36	32	32	+4	4th	8	0	6	2	0	1	6	-5
1994–95	–	–	–	–	–	–	–	–	–	–								
1995–96	10th	27	3	12	12	19	39	21	-20	Did not enter								
1998–99	8th	18	4	8	6	17	22	20	-5	Did not enter								
1999-00 A	4th	18	7	7	4	22	15	28	+7	4th	4	1	1	2	3	5	4	-2
1999-00 C	7th	18	6	4	8	20	25	32	-5	Did not enter								
2000–01 A	10th	18	3	6	9	9	32	15	-23	Did not enter								
2000–01 C	5th	18	5	6	7	19	24	21	-5	Did not enter								

- The 1972–73 season was canceled after 9 rounds.
