= Milton Flores =

Honduran footballer (1974-2003)

Personal information
- Full name: Milton Javier Flores Miranda
- Date of birth: 5 December 1974
- Place of birth: La Lima, Honduras
- Date of death: 19 January 2003 (aged 28)
- Place of death: San Pedro Sula
- Height: 1.83 m (6 ft 0 in)
- Position: Goalkeeper

Senior career*
| Years | Team | Apps | (Gls) |
| 1992–2002 | Real España | 231 | (0) |

International career^{‡}
| 1995–2001 | Honduras | 22 | (0) |
- * Club domestic league appearances and goals ‡ National team caps and goals as of 15 January 2013

Milton Javier Flores Miranda (5 December 1974 – 19 January 2003) was a Honduran football player.

== Early years ==
Flores was born to Pedro Alfredo Flores and Janneth Miranda in La Lima, Honduras. Near sports recreation park named Polideportivo Chulavista, he started playing baseball, but later his goalkeeper talent was discovered. He attended elementary school Manuel Bonilla, where he became best friends with Carlos Pavón. He also played in La Mosquito.

== Club career ==
Nicknamed el Chocolate, the goalkeeper played 231 games for Real España from 1992 to 2002. Real Españas fans idolized Chocolate for his excellent performances with the team.

== International career ==
Flores made his debut for Honduras in a January 1996 CONCACAF Gold Cup match against Brazil and had earned a total of 22 caps, scoring no goals. He has represented his country in 8 FIFA World Cup qualification matches and played at the 1996 and 1998 CONCACAF Gold Cups. He also was part of the Honduras national football team at the 1995 UNCAF Nations Cup.

His final international was a July 2001 FIFA World Cup qualification match against Costa Rica.

One of the most famous games Chocolate ever played was against Brazil for the Panamericanos Of Mar del Plata, Argentina, where he stopped 3 penalties and scored the goal that passed Honduras to the next stage. After that goal, Chocolate danced punta, the national Honduran dance, as a celebration. He was the goalkeeper of the Honduras national soccer team, on the game they won Mexico for the first time in history on qualifiers, at the end of the game, in an interview by Salvador Nasralla, crying he dedicated the win to his mother, who had died years before.

== Death and legacy ==
He was killed by automatic weapons fire as he was allegedly engaged in a sexual act in his parked car in La Unión, the red light district of San Pedro Sula. After the shooting, he tried to drive himself to a hospital but drove into a tree where he died. It has, alternatively, been voiced that he was passing a notoriously criminal neighborhood where gang members, taking his for a rival car, started shooting Flores' car.

After his death, a football stadium was named after him in La Lima, his hometown. His wake took place in Polideportivo Chulavista, with massive attendance by fans, making it one of the most noted funerals ever in Honduras. Soccer players, friends, TV reporters from national and international channels and family gathered to say farewell. He was famous for his imitations of TV personalities in Honduras, and a skillful dancing. Real Espana's fans remember him as one of their team's most memorable players until the present day. He was buried in Lima Nueva Cemetery, next to his mother. He was survived by his wife, Roxana Flores.

== Honours and awards ==
=== Club ===
C.D. Real Espana

- Liga Profesional de Honduras (4): 1993–94, 2003–04 A, 2006–07 C, 2010–11 A
- Honduran Cup: (1): 1992

=== Country ===
Honduras

- Copa Centroamericana (1): 1995
