= Honduran Liga Nacional de Ascenso =

Honduran association football league

Liga Nacional de Ascenso de Honduras
- Founded: 17 December 1979; 46 years ago
- First season: 1980
- Country: Honduras
- Confederation: CONCACAF
- Number of clubs: 35 (2024-25)
- Level on pyramid: 2
- Promotion to: Liga Nacional
- Relegation to: Liga Mayor
- Current champions: Choloma (Apertura 2024)
- Most championships: Juticalpa (5)
- Broadcasters: SulaTV; Multicable; Canal 6 Deportes TVC; Vallevisión
- Current: 2025–26 Liga de Ascenso

Liga de Ascenso (Promotion League) is the second division of Honduran football; it was founded on 17 December 1979 as Segunda División (Second Division) and renamed Liga de Ascenso (Promotion League) on 21 July 2002. The league is divided into 4 groups: Zona Norte y Atlántica (North and Atlantic Zone), Zona Norte y Occidente (North and West Zone), Zona Centro y Sur (Central and South Zone), Zona Sur y Oriente (South and East Zone). The top 2 teams of each group qualifies for the liguilla (play-offs). Each season is divided into two tournaments, Apertura (opening) and Clausura (closing). The champions of the opening and closing tournament compete for the promotion to Liga Nacional de Fútbol de Honduras in a two-legged match.

Two teams are relegated to Liga Mayor de Futbol de Honduras. The last team of each group face off in a playoff (North vs North and South vs South).

== History ==
From 1965 to 1979 the system of promotion to the Liga Nacional was ruled by the Extra-scholastic Sporting Federation of Honduras(Federación Deportiva Extraescolar de Honduras). It was played in amateur form and the champion of the Central, Southern, and Oriental zone would play against the champion of the North Western zone. The Winner was promoted to the Liga Nacional. In the first tournament of the Liga Nacional there wasn't any promoted or relegated since it was a draft tournament.

It was until 1980 when the second division was founded which nowadays it's called Liga Nacional de Ascenso de Honduras (National Promotion League of Honduras).

In that season, the league didn't have any relegated team since the players of the Honduras national football team needed to be in training at full-time. From the year on, the rules have been applied and there have been many promoted and relegated teams.

From 2004 on the league was split into two seasons, apertura (opening) and clausura (closing). Promotion is decided by a two-legged match between apertura and clausura champion. In the case of the same team being champion in both tournaments, promotion is automatic.

In 2006 Hispano was relegated from first division but they bought Valencia's category in the league; this situation has occurred with other teams. In 2002 Victoria were relegated but acquired Honduras Salzburg's spot.

In 2009 Atletico Gualala earned promotion but decided to merge with that year's relegated club, Real Juventud and kept their history. In 2003 Real Maya merged with Patepluma to form Real Patepluma.

== 2024-25 clubs ==
=== Clubs from Zona Litoral Atlántica ===
- Arsenal (Coxen Hole, Islas de la Bahia)
- Atlético Boca Junior (Tocoa, Colón)
- CARVA (Coyoles Central, Olanchito, Yoro)
- Discua Nicolás (El Progreso, Yoro)
- Tela F.C. (Tela, Atlántida)
- Trujillo FC (Trujillo, Colón)
- C.D.S. Vida (La Ceiba, Atlántida)
- Yoro FC (Yoro, Yoro)

=== Clubs from Zona Occidental ===
- Atlético Esperanzano (La Esperanza, Intibucá)
- Atlético Pinares (Nueva Ocotepeque, Ocotepeque)
- Deportes Savio (Santa Rosa de Copán, Copán)
- Lepaera FC (Lepaera, Lempira)
- Olimpia Occidental (La Entrada, Copán)
- Real Juventud (Santa Bárbara, Santa Bárbara)
- San Juan (Quimistán, Santa Bárbara)
- Trinidad FC (Trinidad, Santa Bárbara)

=== Teams from Zona Norte y Valle de Sula ===
- Atlético Choloma (Choloma, Cortés)
- Atlético Limeño (La Lima, Cortés)
- Atlético Independiente (Siguatepeque, Comayagua)
- Brasilia FC (Río Lindo, Cortés)
- Comayagua FC (Comayagua, Comayagua)
- Municipal Santa Cruz (Santa Cruz de Yojoa, Cortés)
- Parrillas One (San Pedro Sula, Cortés)
- Villanueva FC (Villanueva, Cortés)

=== Teams from Zona Centro, Sur y Oriente ===
- Estrella Roja (Danlí, El Paraiso)
- Gimnástico (Tegucigalpa, Francisco Morazán)
- Lobos UPN (Tegucigalpa, Francisco Morazán)
- Olancho FC (Juticalpa, Olancho)
- Valencia (Tegucigalpa, Francisco Morazan)
- Valle FC (Nacaome, Valle)
- Atlético Olanchano from (Catacamas, Olancho) were excluded due to failing to register in time

== Winners ==
- From 1966 to present.
- Segunda División (1966–2002). Liga de Ascenso (2002–).
- Up until 2004, champions were awarded automatic promotion.
- Apertura and Clausura format established since 2004.

Season	Champion	Runner-up	Semifinalists	
1966–67	Atlético Indio	Victoria		
1967–68	Victoria	Federal		
1968–69	Lempira	Broncos		
1969–70	Verdún	San Pedro		
1970–71	Troya	Lenca		
1971–72	Universidad	Victoria		
1972–73	Cancelled			
1973	Federal	San Pedro		
1974	Atlántida	Salamar		
1975	Campamento	Lenca		
1976	Victoria	Curacao		
1977	Tiburones	Alianza		
1978–79	Portuario	Federal		
1979	Atlético Fusep	Juventud Ribereña		
1980	Independiente	Curacao		
1981	Dandy	Súper Estrella		
1982	Platense	Curacao		
1983	Sula	Independiente		
1984	Tela Timsa	Atlético Independiente		
1985	Curacao	Tela Timsa		
1986	Universidad	Lempira Hermacasa		
1987–88	Súper Estrella	Tela Timsa		
1988	Broncos	Modernic		
1989–90	Tela Timsa	Universidad		
1990–91	E.A.C.I.	Palestino		
1991–92	Real Maya	Sitra Acensa		
1992–93	Deportes Progreseño	Palestino		
1993–94	Atlético Indio	Universidad		
1994–95	Independiente	Nacional		
1995–96	Universidad	Atlético Independiente	Atlético Nacional	Halcón Terrazos
1996–97	Atlético Indio	Halcón Terrazos		
1997–98	Alianza	Real Sociedad		
1998–99	Federal	Atlético Melgar		
1999–2000	Deportes Savio	Palestino		
2000–01	Real Maya	Real Comayagua	Atlético Independiente	Real Sociedad
2001–02	Honduras Salzburg	Parrillas One	Atlético Olanchano	Real Sociedad
2002–03	Atlético Olanchano	Deportes Savio	Social Sol	Municipal Valencia
2003–04	Municipal Valencia	Hispano	Atlético Independiente	Atlético Esperanzano
2004–05 A	Deportes Savio	Social Sol	Arsenal	Deportes Concepción
2004–05 C	Hispano	Deportes Savio		
2005–06 A	Atlético Olanchano	Juticalpa Tulín		
2005–06 C	Lenca	Real Juventud	Olimpia B	Atlético Olanchano
2006–07 A	Deportes Savio	Arsenal	Real Juventud	Lenca
2006–07 C	Arsenal	Cruz Azul	Atlético Esperanzano	Deportes Savio
2007–08 A	Real Juventud	Arsenal	Unión Ájax	Olimpia Occidental
2007–08 C	Real Juventud	Social Sol	Motagua B	Olimpia B
2008–09 A	Atlético Gualala	Municipal Silca	Unión Ájax	Necaxa
2008–09 C	Necaxa	Social Sol	Olimpia Occidental	Atlético Olanchano
2009–10 A	Necaxa	Atlético Choloma	Social Sol	Olimpia Occidental
2009–10 C	Necaxa	Atlético Independiente	Atlético Choloma	Real Juventud
2010–11 A	Parrillas One	Yoro	Atlético Municipal	Atlético Esperanzano
2010–11 C	Atlético Choloma	Real Sociedad	Yoro	Atlético Municipal
2011–12 A	Real Sociedad	Atlético Municipal	Hispano	Parrillas One
2011–12 C	Parrillas One	Real Sociedad	Juticalpa	Jaguares UPNFM
2012–13 A	Juticalpa	Atlético Municipal	Yoro	Honduras Progreso
2012–13 C	Parrillas One	Yoro	Jaguares UPNFM	Juticalpa
2013–14 A	Honduras Progreso	Atlético Choloma		
2013–14 C	Honduras Progreso	Juticalpa		
2014–15 A	Juticalpa	Jaguares UPNFM	Atlético Municipal	Villanueva or Social Sol
2014–15 C	Juticalpa	Atlético Independiente	Atlético Limeño	
2015–16 A	Social Sol	Deportes Savio		
2015–16 C	Alianza Becerra	Parrillas One	Social Sol	Lepaera
2016–17 A	Lepaera	Yoro	Gimnástico	Tela
2016–17 C	UPNFM	Villanueva	Lepaera	Olancho
2017–18 A	Infop RNP	Villanueva	Social Sol	Parrillas One
2017–18 C	Infop RNP	Villanueva	Yoro	Parrillas One
2018–19 A	Real Sociedad	San Juan	Pinares	Gimnástico
2018–19 C	Olancho	Santos	Pinares	Boca Juniors
2019–20 A	Pinares	Santos	San Juan	Atlético Independiente
2019–20 C	Delicias	Santos	Paris F.C.	Olancho

== Wins by club ==
Club	Winners	Runners-up	Winning years
Deportes Savio	3	3	1999–2000, 2004–05 A, 2006–07 A
Universidad	3	2	1971–72, 1986, 1995–96
Juticalpa Tulín / Juticalpa	3	2	2012–13 A, 2014–15 A, 2014–15 C
Parrillas One	3	2	2010–11 A, 2011–12 C, 2012–13 C
Atlético Indio	3	0	1966–67, 1990–91, 1996–97
Necaxa	3	0	2008–09 C, 2009–10 A, 2009–10 C
Campamento / Atlético Olanchano	3	0	1975, 2002–03, 2005–06 A
Real Sociedad	2	3	2011–12 A, 2018–19 A
Victoria	2	2	1967–68, 1976
Federal	2	2	1973, 1998–99
Independiente	2	1	1980, 1994–95
Tela Timsa	2	1	1984, 1989–90
Real Juventud	2	1	2007–08 A, 2007–08 C
Real Maya	2	0	1991–92, 2000–01
Honduras Progreso	2	0	2013–14 A, 2013–14 C
Infop RNP	2	0	2017–18 A, 2017–18 C
Alianza Becerra / Olancho	2	0	2015–16 C, 2018–19 C
Curacao	1	4	1987–88
Social Sol	1	3	2015–16 A
Lenca	1	2	2005–06 C
Arsenal	1	2	2006–07 C
Atlético Choloma	1	2	2010–11 C
Súper Estrella	1	1	1988
Broncos	1	1	1993–94
Alianza	1	1	1997–98
Hispano	1	1	2004–05 C
UPNFM	1	1	2016–17 C
Lempira	1	0	1968–69
Verdún	1	0	1969–70
Troya	1	0	1970–71
Atlántida	1	0	1974
Tiburones	1	0	1977
Portuario	1	0	1978–79
Atlético Fusep	1	0	1979
Dandy	1	0	1981
Platense	1	0	1982
Sula	1	0	1983
E.A.C.I.	1	0	1985
Deportes Progreseño	1	0	1992–93
Honduras Salzburg	1	0	2001–02
Municipal Valencia	1	0	2003–04
Atlético Gualala	1	0	2008–09 A
Lepaera	1	0	2016–17 A
Pinares	1	0	2019–20 A
Atlético Independiente	0	4	—
Yoro	0	3	—
Villanueva	0	3	—
Palestino	0	2	—
San Pedro	0	2	—
Atlético Municipal	0	2	—
Santos	0	2	—
Salamar	0	1	—
Juventud Ribereña	0	1	—
Lempira Hermacasa	0	1	—
Modernic	0	1	—
Sitra Acensa	0	1	—
Nacional	0	1	—
Halcón Terrazos	0	1	—
Atlético Melgar	0	1	—
Real Comayagua	0	1	—
Cruz Azul	0	1	—
Municipal Silca	0	1	—
San Juan	0	1	—
Atlético INTUR	0	0	—

== Promotion ==
In 2004 the league format was changed into short tournaments splitting the season into two separate tournaments, apertura (opening) and clausura (closing). Promotion was decided by a two-legged final until 2012, and is now contested in a single match between apertura champion and clausura champion. In the case that a same team is crowned champion both apertura and clausura, promotion is awarded automatically to said team.

Season	Promoted team	Agg.	Opponent	Observations
2004–05	Hispano	0–0	Deportes Savio	Hispano won 3–2 on penalty shootouts.
2005–06	Atlético Olanchano	3–2	Lenca	
2006–07	Deportes Savio	1–0	Arsenal	
2007–08	Real Juventud	–	none	Real Juventud automatically promoted as winners of both Apertura and Clausura.
2008–09	Atlético Gualala	2–1	Necaxa	Real Juventud purchased Atlético Gualala's franchise.
2009–10	Necaxa	–	none	Necaxa automatically promoted as winners of both Apertura and Clausura.
2010–11	Atlético Choloma	2–1	Parrillas One	
2011–12	Real Sociedad	2–0	Parrillas One	
2012–13	Parrillas One	1–1	Juticalpa	Parrillas One won 5–4 on penalty shootouts.
2013–14	Honduras Progreso	–	none	Honduras Progreso automatically promoted as winners of both Apertura and Clausura.
2014–15	Juticalpa	–	none	Juticalpa automatically promoted as winners of both Apertura and Clausura.
2015–16	Social Sol	1–1	Alianza Becerra	Social Sol won 7–6 on penalty shootouts.
2016–17	UPNFM	1–0	Lepaera	
2017–18	Infop RNP	–	none	Infop RNP automatically promoted as winners of both Apertura and Clausura.
2018–19	Real Sociedad	1–1	Olancho	Real Sociedad won 4–3 on penalty shootouts.

== Relegation ==
In the current system, the last team of each group of the region play on a playoff.
