= Pumas UNAH =

UNAH
- Full name: Pumas de la Universidad Nacional; Autónoma de Honduras
- Nicknames: Pumas; La U Los Universitarios (The University Students); Los Estudiosos (The Studious)
- Founded: 12 December 1965; 60 years ago
- Dissolved: August 2010
- Ground: Estadio Tiburcio Carías Andino
- Capacity: 35,000
- Chairman: José Raúl; Leitzelar Vidaurreta
- Manager: Alfonso Rendòn
Home colours	Away colours	Third colours

Pumas de la UNAH or simply Universidad was a Honduran football club.

== History ==
They were formed to represent the Universidad Nacional Autonoma de Honduras. They merged with Broncos, forming Broncos de la UNAH, twice in 1982–83 and 2006–07 and meanwhile played in Choluteca those two seasons. They had initially taken over the Club Deportivo Atlético Español franchise.

During their stay at first division as Pumas, they played in Comayagua. They were dissolved in August 2010 due to financial difficulties; the Universidad Pedagógica Nacional (UPN) took their place in the Liga de Ascenso.

Coincidentally, the Pumas were runners-up to the more prominent UNAM Pumas in the 1980 CONCACAF Champions' Cup.

== Achievements ==
- Liga Nacional
  - Runners-up (2): 1979–80, 1983–84
- Segunda División
  - Winners (3): 1971–72, 1986, 1995–96
- CONCACAF Champions' Cup
  - Runners-up (1): 1980

== All-time league performance ==
Regular season											Post season								
Season	Pos	P	W	D	L	F	A	PTS	+/-	Ded.	Pos	P	W	D	L	F	A	PTS	+/-
1972–73	9th	9	2	1	6	7	18	5	-11	-	No post season this year								
1973–74	7th	27	8	9	10	26	28	25	-2	–	No post season this year								
1974–75	9th	36	9	11	16	29	36	43	-7	–	Did not enter								
1975–76	4th	27	9	12	6	24	17	30	+7	–	4th	6	2	2	2	5	8	6	-3
1976–77	6th	27	9	9	9	20	21	27	-1	–	Did not enter								
1977–78	5th	27	10	8	9	25	23	28	+2	–	5th	9	2	2	5	5	13	6	-8
1978–79	7th	27	8	10	9	17	20	26	-3	–	Did not enter								
1979–80	6th	27	9	9	9	22	22	27	0	–	Runner-up	11	5	4	2	9	6	14	+3
1980–81	7th	27	10	3	14	33	35	23	-2	–	Did not enter								
1981–82	10th	30	6	11	13	21	26	23	-5	–	Did not enter								
1982–83	8th	27	5	12	10	30	36	22	-6	–	Did not enter								
1983–84	Runner-up	36	13	14	9	40	26	40	+14	–	No post season this year								
1984–85	7th	36	9	16	11	35	39	34	-4	–	Did not enter								
1985–86	10th	18	4	4	10	13	22	12	-9	–	Relegated	2	0	1	1	0	1	1	-1
1987–88	9th	27	4	12	11	23	36	20	-13	–	Did not enter								
1988–89	10th	27	7	7	13	15	26	21	-11	–	Did not enter								
1996–97	7th	27	6	10	11	17	27	28	-10	–	Did not enter								
1997–98 A	6th	20	8	6	6	29	26	30	+3	–	5th	2	0	2	0	1	1	2	0
1997–98 C	11th	20	1	6	13	14	33	9	-19	–	Did not enter								
1998–99	3rd	18	7	6	5	24	21	27	+3	–	5th	2	1	0	1	2	3	3	-1
1999-00 A	7th	18	4	7	7	20	23	19	-3	–	Did not enter								
1999-00 C	9th	18	3	7	8	18	36	16	-18	–	Did not enter								
2000–01 A	5th	18	7	3	8	17	21	24	-4	–	3rd	4	2	1	1	5	5	7	0
2000–01 C	8th	18	4	6	8	15	21	18	-6	–	Did not enter								
2001–02 A	9th	18	3	6	9	20	31	15	-11	–	Did not enter								
2001–02 C	6th	18	5	8	5	13	18	23	-5	–	Did not enter								
2002–03 A	7th	18	3	11	4	20	26	19	-6	-1	Did not enter								
2002–03 C	7th	18	4	8	6	11	17	20	-6	–	Did not enter								
2003–04 A	7th	18	4	9	5	14	20	21	-6	–	Did not enter								
2003–04 C	9th	16	3	4	9	8	20	13	-12	–	Did not enter								
2004–05 A	10th	18	2	4	12	12	30	10	-18	–	Did not enter								
2004–05 C	3rd	18	6	8	4	7	8	26	-1	–	3rd	2	0	2	0	1	1	2	0
2005–06 A	5th	18	6	6	6	19	21	24	-2	–	Did not enter								
2005–06 C	8th	18	3	8	7	15	24	17	-9	–	Did not enter								
2006–07 A	9th	18	3	5	10	17	26	14	-9	–	Did not enter								
2006–07 C	10th	17	0	6	11	7	39	6	-32	–	Did not enter								

- The 1972–73 season was canceled.
- On 1982–83 and 2006–07 Apertura & Clausura as Broncos UNAH.

== International appearances ==
- CONCACAF Champions' Cup 1980
1980-05-20

Cobán Imperial (Guatemala)	2–1	(Honduras) Pumas UNAH
	1st round

Guatemala City
1980-06-11

Pumas UNAH (Honduras)	1–0	(Guatemala) Cobán Imperial
	1st round

Tegucigalpa
1980-11-06

Pumas UNAH (Honduras)	2–2	(El Salvador) Santiagueño
	3rd round

Tegucigalpa
1980-11-13

Santiagueño (El Salvador)	1–3	(Honduras) Pumas UNAH
	3rd round

San Salvador
1981-02-10

Pumas UNAH (Honduras)	1–1	(Suriname) Robinhood
	Final round

Tegucigalpa
1981-02-12

Pumas UNAH (Honduras)	0–2	(Mexico) Pumas UNAM
	Final round

Tegucigalpa
- CONCACAF Champions' Cup 1984
1984-03-21

Pumas UNAH (Honduras)	0–0	(Mexico) Puebla
	1st round

Choluteca
1984-04-25

Puebla (Mexico)	2–1	(Honduras) Pumas UNAH
	1st round

Puebla

== Coaches ==
- (Honduras) Alfonso Uclés (1979)
- (Honduras) Chelato Uclés (1983)
- (Argentina) Héctor Vargas (1997–1999)
- (Honduras) Gilberto Yearwood (1999–2000)
- (Brazil) Flavio Ortega (2000)
- (Argentina) Héctor Vargas (2000–2002)
- (Argentina) Héctor Vargas (2004–2005)
