= 1997–98 C.D. Motagua season =

Motagua
1997–98 season
- Chairman: Eduardo Atala
- Manager: Ramón Maradiaga
- Apertura: Winners
- Clausura: Winners
- Cup: Runners-up
- Grandes de Centroamérica: Group stage
| Home colours | Away colours |

The 1997–98 C.D. Motagua season in the Honduran football league was divided into two halves, Apertura and Clausura. Motagua was capable to win both tournaments, having achieved the first bi-championship in their history.

== Apertura ==
=== Squad ===
Note: Flags indicate national team as defined under FIFA eligibility rules; some limited exceptions apply. Players may hold more than one non-FIFA nationality.

| No. | Pos. | Nation | Player |
|---|---|---|---|
| – | GK | (Argentina) ARG | Diego Vásquez |
| – | GK | (Honduras) HON | Hugo Caballero |
| – | GK | (Honduras) HON | Noel Valladares |
| – | DF | (Honduras) HON | Hernaín Arzú |
| – | DF | (Honduras) HON | Reynaldo Clavasquín |
| – | DF | (Honduras) HON | Iván Guerrero |
| – | DF | (Honduras) HON | Elmer Montoya |
| – | DF | (Honduras) HON | Júnior Izaguirre |
| – | DF | (Honduras) HON | Ninrrol Medina |
| – | DF | (Honduras) HON | Milton Reyes |
| – | DF | (Honduras) HON | José Romero |
| – | MF | (Honduras) HON | Mario Chirinos |
| – | MF | (Honduras) HON | Juan Coello |
| – | MF | (Honduras) HON | Amado Guevara |

| No. | Pos. | Nation | Player |
|---|---|---|---|
| – | MF | (Honduras) HON | Luis Guifarro |
| – | MF | (Colombia) COL | Carlos Bacca |
| – | MF | (Argentina) ARG | Ariel Leyes |
| – | MF | (Honduras) HON | Óscar Lagos |
| – | MF | (Honduras) HON | Juan Raudales |
| – | MF | (Honduras) HON | Níguel Zúniga |
| – | MF | (Honduras) HON | German Rodríguez |
| – | FW | (Honduras) HON | Presley Carson |
| – | FW | (Honduras) HON | Marlon Hernández |
| – | FW | (Honduras) HON | Jairo Martínez |
| – | FW | (Colombia) COL | Roberto Asprilla |
| – | FW | (Honduras) HON | Francisco Ramírez |
| – | FW | (Brazil) BRA | Ottavio Santana |

=== Standings ===
| Pos | Team | Pld | W | D | L | GF | GA | GD | Pts | Qualification or relegation |
|---|---|---|---|---|---|---|---|---|---|---|
| 1 | Platense (Note: Platense 1997 Honduran Cup champions as regular season winner.) | 20 | 12 | 2 | 6 | 42 | 26 | +16 | 38 | Qualified to the Final round |
| 2 | Motagua | 20 | 10 | 7 | 3 | 23 | 17 | +6 | 37 | Qualified to the Final round |
| 3 | Olimpia | 20 | 9 | 9 | 2 | 33 | 21 | +12 | 36 | Qualified to the Final round |
| 4 | Marathón | 20 | 8 | 8 | 4 | 30 | 24 | +6 | 32 | Qualified to the Final round |
| 5 | Real España | 20 | 8 | 8 | 4 | 30 | 26 | +4 | 32 | Qualified to the Final round |

=== Matches ===
==== Results by round ====
| Round | 1 | 2 | 3 | 4 | 5 | 6 | 7 | 8 | 9 | 10 | 11 | 12 | 13 | 14 | 15 | 16 | 17 | 18 | 19 | 20 |
|---|---|---|---|---|---|---|---|---|---|---|---|---|---|---|---|---|---|---|---|---|
| Ground | H | H | H | A | H | A | H | A | A | A | A | A | A | H | A | H | A | H | H | H |
| Result | W | D | D | L | W | W | L | W | W | D | W | W | D | W | D | D | W | L | D | W |
| Position | 4 | 4 | 5 | 8 | 6 | 4 | 5 | 3 | 3 | 4 | 3 | 2 | 2 | 2 | 2 | 2 | 2 | 2 | 2 | 2 |

A = Away; H = Home; W = Win; D = Draw; L = Loss

==== Regular season ====
| 24 August 1997 Round 1 | Motagua | 1–0 | Vida | Tegucigalpa, Francisco Morazán |
| 16:00 (UTC−06) | Coello | | | Stadium: Estadio Tiburcio Carías Andino |

| 31 August 1997 Round 2 | Motagua | 0–0 | Victoria | Tegucigalpa, Francisco Morazán |
| 16:00 (UTC−06) | | | | Stadium: Estadio Tiburcio Carías Andino |

| 11 September 1997 Round 3 | Motagua | 1–1 | Universidad | Tegucigalpa, Francisco Morazán |
| 19:30 (UTC−06) | Hernández | | Lagos | Stadium: Estadio Tiburcio Carías Andino |

| 14 September 1997 Round 4 | Platense | 1–0 | Motagua | Puerto Cortés, Cortés |
| 15:00 (UTC−06) | | | | Stadium: Estadio Excélsior |

| 23 September 1997 Round 5 | Motagua | 2–1 | Real Maya | Tegucigalpa, Francisco Morazán |
| 19:30 (UTC−06) | Hernández | | | Stadium: Estadio Tiburcio Carías Andino |

| 4 October 1997 Round 6 | Palestino | 3–4 | Motagua | San Pedro Sula, Cortés |
| 19:30 (UTC−06) | | | Asprilla; Guevara; Guifarro; Carson | Stadium: Estadio Francisco Morazán |

| 12 October 1997 Round 7 | Motagua | 0–1 | Marathón | Tegucigalpa, Francisco Morazán |
| 16:00 (UTC−06) | | | | Stadium: Estadio Tiburcio Carías Andino |

| 19 October 1997 Round 8 | Olimpia | 0–1 | Motagua | Tegucigalpa, Francisco Morazán |
| 16:00 (UTC−06) | | | 88' Martínez | Stadium: Estadio Tiburcio Carías Andino |

| 22 October 1997 Round 9 | Real España | 0–2 | Motagua | San Pedro Sula, Cortés |
| 19:30 (UTC−06) | | | Carson; Hernández | Stadium: Estadio Francisco Morazán |

| 26 October 1997 Round 10 | Independiente Villela | 1–1 | Motagua | El Progreso, Yoro |
| 15:00 (UTC−06) | | | Clavasquín | Stadium: Estadio Humberto Micheletti |

| 9 November 1997 Round 11 | Vida | 0–1 | Motagua | La Ceiba, Atlántida |
| 15:00 (UTC−06) | | | Clavasquín | Stadium: Estadio Nilmo Edwards |

| 15 November 1997 Round 12 | Victoria | 2–3 | Motagua | La Ceiba, Atlántida |
| 19:30 (UTC−06) | | | Hernández; Coello; Martínez | Stadium: Estadio Nilmo Edwards |

| 23 November 1997 Round 13 | Universidad | 1–1 | Motagua | Tegucigalpa, Francisco Morazán |
| | | | Carson | Stadium: Estadio Tiburcio Carías Andino |

| 7 December 1997 Round 14 | Motagua | 1–0 | Platense | Tegucigalpa, Francisco Morazán |
| 16:00 (UTC−06) | Arzú | | | Stadium: Estadio Tiburcio Carías Andino |

| 23 December 1997 Round 15 | Real Maya | 0–0 | Motagua | Siguatepeque, Comayagua |
| | | | | Stadium: Estadio Roberto Martínez Avila |

| 30 December 1997 Round 16 | Motagua | 1–1 | Palestino | Tegucigalpa, Francisco Morazán |
| 19:30 (UTC−06) | Carson | | | Stadium: Estadio Tiburcio Carías Andino |

| 10 January 1998 Round 17 | Marathón | 0–1 | Motagua | San Pedro Sula, Cortés |
| 19:30 (UTC−06) | | | Hernández | Stadium: Estadio Francisco Morazán |

| 18 January 1998 Round 18 | Motagua | 0–3 | Olimpia | Tegucigalpa, Francisco Morazán |
| 16:00 (UTC−06) | | | | Stadium: Estadio Tiburcio Carías Andino |

| 15 February 1998 Round 19 | Motagua | 1–1 | Real España | Tegucigalpa, Francisco Morazán |
| 14:00 (UTC−06) | Coello | | | Stadium: Estadio Tiburcio Carías Andino |

| 22 February 1998 Round 20 | Motagua | 2–1 | Independiente Villela | Tegucigalpa, Francisco Morazán |
| 16:00 (UTC−06) | Leyes; Lagos | | | Stadium: Estadio Tiburcio Carías Andino |

==== Hexagonal ====
| 7 March 1998 1st leg | Real España | 0–0 | Motagua | San Pedro Sula, Cortés |
| 19:30 (UTC−06) | | | | Stadium: Estadio Olímpico Metropolitano |

| 18 March 1998 2nd leg | Motagua | 1–1 | Real España | Tegucigalpa, Francisco Morazán |
| 19:30 (UTC−06) | Martínez 85' | | Cabrera 80' | Stadium: Estadio Tiburcio Carías Andino |

- Motagua 1–1 Real España on aggregate; Motagua advanced on better Regular season record.

==== Semifinals ====
| 23 March 1998 1st leg | Olimpia | 1–2 | Motagua | Tegucigalpa, Francisco Morazán |
| 16:00 (UTC−06) | Costa | | Guevara; Hernández | Stadium: Estadio Tiburcio Carías Andino |

| 4 April 1998 2nd leg | Motagua | 0–1 | Olimpia | Tegucigalpa, Francisco Morazán |
| 16:00 (UTC−06) | | | Chacón | Stadium: Estadio Tiburcio Carías Andino |

- Motagua 2–2 Olimpia on aggregate; Motagua advanced on better Regular season record.

==== Final ====
| 15 April 1998 1st leg | Real España | 0–3 | Motagua | San Pedro Sula, Cortés |
| 19:30 (UTC−06) | | | Ramírez 21'; Lagos 55'; Guevara 89' | Stadium: Estadio Olímpico Metropolitano |

| 18 April 1998 2nd leg | Motagua | 2–1 | Real España | Tegucigalpa, Francisco Morazán |
| 19:30 (UTC−06) | Ramírez 20'; Guevara 32' | | Morales 26' | Stadium: Estadio Tiburcio Carías Andino |

- Motagua won 5–1 on aggregate.

== Clausura ==
=== Squad ===
Note: Flags indicate national team as defined under FIFA eligibility rules; some limited exceptions apply. Players may hold more than one non-FIFA nationality.

| No. | Pos. | Nation | Player |
|---|---|---|---|
| – | GK | (Argentina) ARG | Diego Vásquez |
| – | GK | (Honduras) HON | Hugo Caballero |
| – | GK | (Honduras) HON | Noel Valladares |
| – | DF | (Honduras) HON | Hernaín Arzú |
| – | DF | (Honduras) HON | Reynaldo Clavasquín |
| – | DF | (Honduras) HON | Iván Guerrero |
| – | DF | (Honduras) HON | Elmer Montoya |
| – | DF | (Honduras) HON | Júnior Izaguirre |
| – | DF | (Honduras) HON | Ninrrol Medina |
| – | DF | (Honduras) HON | Milton Reyes |
| – | DF | (Honduras) HON | José Romero |
| – | MF | (Honduras) HON | Mario Chirinos |

| No. | Pos. | Nation | Player |
|---|---|---|---|
| – | MF | (Honduras) HON | Juan Coello |
| – | MF | (Honduras) HON | Amado Guevara |
| – | MF | (Honduras) HON | Luis Guifarro |
| – | MF | (Argentina) ARG | Ariel Leyes |
| – | MF | (Honduras) HON | Óscar Lagos |
| – | MF | (Honduras) HON | Juan Raudales |
| – | MF | (Honduras) HON | German Rodríguez |
| – | FW | (Honduras) HON | Presley Carson |
| – | FW | (Honduras) HON | Marlon Hernández |
| – | FW | (Honduras) HON | Jairo Martínez |
| – | FW | (Honduras) HON | Francisco Ramírez |

=== Standings ===
| Pos | Team | Pld | W | D | L | GF | GA | GD | Pts | Qualification or relegation |
|---|---|---|---|---|---|---|---|---|---|---|
| 1 | Olimpia | 20 | 13 | 7 | 0 | 46 | 15 | +31 | 46 | Qualified to the Final round |
| 2 | Motagua | 20 | 14 | 4 | 2 | 39 | 15 | +24 | 46 | Qualified to the Final round |
| 3 | Platense | 20 | 8 | 8 | 4 | 36 | 30 | +6 | 32 | Qualified to the Final round |
| 4 | Marathón | 20 | 7 | 9 | 4 | 29 | 28 | +1 | 30 | Qualified to the Final round |
| 5 | Real Maya | 20 | 8 | 4 | 8 | 26 | 27 | −1 | 28 | Qualified to the Final round |

=== Matches ===
==== Results by round ====
| Round | 1 | 2 | 3 | 4 | 5 | 6 | 7 | 8 | 9 | 10 | 11 | 12 | 13 | 14 | 15 | 16 | 17 | 18 | 19 | 20 |
|---|---|---|---|---|---|---|---|---|---|---|---|---|---|---|---|---|---|---|---|---|
| Ground | H | H | H | A | H | A | H | A | A | A | A | A | A | H | A | H | A | H | H | H |
| Result | W | W | W | L | W | W | W | W | L | D | W | D | W | W | W | W | D | W | D | W |
| Position | 1 | 1 | 1 | 2 | 2 | 1 | 3 | 1 | 3 | 3 | 2 | 1 | 1 | 1 | 1 | 1 | 1 | 1 | 1 | 2 |

A = Away; H = Home; W = Win; D = Draw; L = Loss

==== Regular season ====
| 26 April 1998 Round 1 | Motagua | 2–0 | Vida | Tegucigalpa, Francisco Morazán |
| 16:00 (UTC−06) | | | | Stadium: Estadio Tiburcio Carías Andino |

| 3 May 1998 Round 2 | Motagua | 1–0 | Victoria | Tegucigalpa, Francisco Morazán |
| 16:00 (UTC−06) | Martínez | | | Stadium: Estadio Tiburcio Carías Andino |

| 7 May 1998 Round 3 | Motagua | 2–1 | Universidad | Tegucigalpa, Francisco Morazán |
| 19:30 (UTC−06) | | | | Stadium: Estadio Tiburcio Carías Andino |

| 17 May 1998 Round 4 | Platense | 3–2 | Motagua | Puerto Cortés, Cortés |
| 15:00 (UTC−06) | | | | Stadium: Estadio Excélsior |

| 7 June 1998 Round 5 | Motagua | 1–0 | Marathón | Tegucigalpa, Francisco Morazán |
| 16:00 (UTC−06) | Martínez 88' | | | Stadium: Estadio Tiburcio Carías Andino |

| 10 June 1998 Round 6 | Real España | 2–4 | Motagua | San Pedro Sula, Cortés |
| 19:30 (UTC−06) | | | | Stadium: Estadio Olímpico Metropolitano |

| 14 June 1998 Round 7 | Olimpia | 2–1 | Motagua | Tegucigalpa, Francisco Morazán |
| 16:00 (UTC−06) | | | | Stadium: Estadio Tiburcio Carías Andino |

| 21 June 1998 Round 8 | Independiente Villela | 3–3 | Motagua | El Progreso, Yoro |
| 15:00 (UTC−06) | | | | Stadium: Estadio Humberto Micheletti; Referee: Marco Urbina |

| 24 June 1998 Round 9 | Motagua | 2–0 | Real Maya | Tegucigalpa, Francisco Morazán |
| 19:30 (UTC−06) | | | | Stadium: Estadio Tiburcio Carías Andino |

| 28 June 1998 Round 10 | Palestino | 0–1 | Motagua | San Pedro Sula, Cortés |
| 19:30 (UTC−06) | | | | Stadium: Estadio Francisco Morazán |

| 5 July 1998 Round 11 | Vida | 1–2 | Motagua | La Ceiba, Atlántida |
| 15:00 (UTC−06) | | | | Stadium: Estadio Nilmo Edwards |

| 15 July 1998 Round 12 | Victoria | 0–0 | Motagua | La Ceiba, Atlántida |
| 19:30 (UTC−06) | | | | Stadium: Estadio Nilmo Edwards |

| 30 July 1998 Round 13 | Universidad | 0–1 | Motagua | Tegucigalpa, Francisco Morazán |
| 16:00 (UTC−06) | | | | Stadium: Estadio Tiburcio Carías Andino |

| 2 August 1998 Round 14 | Motagua | 3–0 | Platense | Tegucigalpa, Francisco Morazán |
| 16:00 (UTC−06) | | | | Stadium: Estadio Tiburcio Carías Andino |

| 8 August 1998 Round 15 | Real Maya | 0–1 | Motagua | Siguatepeque, Comayagua |
| 15:00 (UTC−06) | | | Guevara | Stadium: Estadio Roberto Martínez Avila |

| 13 August 1998 Round 16 | Motagua | 4–1 | Palestino | Tegucigalpa, Francisco Morazán |
| 18:00 (UTC−06) | | | | Stadium: Estadio Tiburcio Carías Andino |

| 15 August 1998 Round 17 | Marathón | 0–0 | Motagua | San Pedro Sula, Cortés |
| 19:30 (UTC−06) | | | | Stadium: Estadio Olímpico Metropolitano |

| 26 August 1998 Round 18 | Motagua | 2–0 | Real España | Tegucigalpa, Francisco Morazán |
| 19:30 (UTC−06) | Hernández; Guevara | | | Stadium: Estadio Tiburcio Carías Andino; Referee: Marcio Carranza |

| 30 August 1998 Round 19 | Motagua | 1–1 | Olimpia | Tegucigalpa, Francisco Morazán |
| 16:00 (UTC−06) | Martínez | | | Stadium: Estadio Tiburcio Carías Andino; Referee: Arturo Tábora |

| 6 September 1998 Round 20 | Motagua | 6–1 | Independiente Villela | Tegucigalpa, Francisco Morazán |
| 16:00 (UTC−06) | | | | Stadium: Estadio Tiburcio Carías Andino |

==== Hexagonal ====
| 20 September 1998 1st leg | Real Maya | 1–4 | Motagua | Siguatepeque, Comayagua |
| | | | | Stadium: Estadio Roberto Martínez Avila |

| 27 September 1998 2nd leg | Motagua | 1–1 | Real Maya | Tegucigalpa, Francisco Morazán |
| 16:00 (UTC−06) | | | | Stadium: Estadio Tiburcio Carías Andino |

- Motagua won 5–2 on aggregate.

==== Semifinals ====
| 4 October 1998 1st round | Platense | 3–3 | Motagua | Puerto Cortés, Cortés |
| 15:00 (UTC−06) | | | | Stadium: Estadio Excélsior |

| 11 October 1998 2nd leg | Motagua | 2–1 | Platense | Tegucigalpa, Francisco Morazán |
| 16:00 (UTC−06) | | | | Stadium: Estadio Tiburcio Carías Andino |

- Motagua won 5–4 on aggregate.

==== Final ====
| 18 October 1998 1st leg | Motagua | 0–0 | Olimpia | Tegucigalpa, Francisco Morazán |
| 16:00 (UTC−06) | | | | Stadium: Estadio Tiburcio Carías Andino |

| 25 October 1998 2nd leg | Olimpia | 0–1 (a.e.t.) | Motagua | Tegucigalpa, Francisco Morazán |
| 16:00 (UTC−06) | | | Clavasquín 117' | Stadium: Estadio Tiburcio Carías Andino |

- Motagua won 1–0 on aggregate.

== 1997–98 Torneo Grandes de Centroamérica ==
=== Matches ===
==== Honduran qualifying ====
| 17 September 1997 Week 1 | Motagua (Honduras) | 1–1 | (Honduras) Real España |
| | Asprilla | | Hernández |

| 8 October 1997 Week 3 | Motagua (Honduras) | 0–1 | (Honduras) Olimpia | Tegucigalpa |
| 19:30 | | | 55' Velásquez | Stadium: Estadio Nacional; Referee: Nelson Cálix Starting XI: Vásquez; Medina; Clavasquín; Arzú; Hernández (substituted off); Guevara; Coello; Hernández; Santana; Asprilla (substituted off); Martínez (substituted off); Substitutes; Raudales (substituted in); Carson (substituted in); Guifarro (substituted in) |

==== Preliminary round ====
| 29 October 1997 1st leg | Motagua (Honduras) | 0–0 | (Guatemala) Comunicaciones | Tegucigalpa, Francisco Morazán |
| 19:30 (UTC−06) | | | | Stadium: Estadio Tiburcio Carías Andino |

| 6 November 1997 2nd leg | Comunicaciones (Guatemala) | 0–0 (3–4 p) | (Honduras) Motagua | Guatemala City, Guatemala |
| 19:30 (UTC−06) | | | | Stadium: Estadio Mateo Flores |

- Comunicaciones 0–0 Motagua on aggregate score; Motagua won 4–3 on penalty shootouts.

==== Group B ====
| Pos | Team | Pld | W | D | L | GF | GA | GD | Pts | Qualification |
|---|---|---|---|---|---|---|---|---|---|---|
| 1 | Saprissa | 6 | 2 | 3 | 1 | 6 | 3 | +3 | 11 (Note: Saprissa two (+2) points added) | Qualified to Semifinals |
| 2 | Real España | 5 | 2 | 3 | 0 | 2 | 0 | +2 | 11 (Note: Real España two (+2) points added) | Qualified to Semifinals |
| 3 | Aurora | 5 | 0 | 3 | 2 | 2 | 6 | −4 | 5 (Note: Aurora two (+2) points added) | |
| 4 | Motagua | 4 | 0 | 3 | 1 | 2 | 3 | −1 | 3 | |

Notes:

| 29 October 1997 Round 1 | Motagua (Honduras) | n/p | (Guatemala) Aurora | Tegucigalpa, Honduras |
| 19:30 (UTC−06:00) | | | | Stadium: Estadio Tiburcio Carías Andino |

| 6 November 1997 Round 2 | Motagua (Honduras) | n/p | (Honduras) Real España | Tegucigalpa, Honduras |
| 19:30 (UTC−06:00) | | | | Stadium: Estadio Tiburcio Carías Andino |

| 12 November 1997 Round 3 | Motagua (Honduras) | 1–1 (3–4 p) | (Costa Rica) Saprissa | Tegucigalpa, Honduras |
| 19:30 (UTC−06:00) | | | | Stadium: Estadio Tiburcio Carías Andino |

| 20 November 1997 Round 4 | Aurora (Guatemala) | 1–1 (4–2 p) | (Honduras) Motagua | Guatemala City, Guatemala |
| 19:30 (UTC−06:00) | | | | Stadium: Estadio del Ejército |

| 29 November 1997 Round 5 | Real España (Honduras) | 0–0 (5–4 p) | (Honduras) Motagua | San Pedro Sula, Honduras |
| 19:30 (UTC−06:00) | | | | Stadium: Estadio Olímpico Metropolitano |

| 11 December 1997 Round 6 | Saprissa (Costa Rica) | 1–0 | (Honduras) Motagua | San José, Costa Rica |
| 19:30 (UTC−06:00) | | | | Stadium: Estadio Ricardo Saprissa Aymá |
