= 1999–2000 C.D. Motagua season =

Motagua
1999–2000 season
- Chairman: Eduardo Atala
- Managers: José Treviño; Luis Reyes
- Stadium: Nacional
- Apertura: Winners
- Clausura: Winners
- UNCAF Interclub Cup: First round
Home colours
- All statistics correct as of 26 August 2000.

The 1999–2000 season was F.C. Motagua's 49th season in existence and the club's 34th consecutive season in the top fight of Honduran football. After finishing in third place last season, the club were looking for their 8th and 9th league title. They also competed in the 1999 UNCAF Interclub Cup.

== Overview ==
After manager Ramón Maradiaga took charge of the Honduras national football team, the club hired Mexican coach José Treviño with whom they were able to win the Apertura tournament. With the win, Treviño returned to Mexico and assistant coach and former striker Luis Reyes managed to repeat and won the Clausura tournament. This was the second time in history the club was able to retain the title consecutively, after doing so in 1997–98. Internationally, Motagua faced Comunicaciones F.C., Juventus FC, C.D. Luis Ángel Firpo and Deportivo Saprissa in the 1999 UNCAF Interclub Cup, but were unable to proceed from the first round.

== Players ==
| No. | Pos. | Player name | Date of birth and age |
|---|---|---|---|
| 1 | GK | (Argentina) Diego Vásquez | 3 July 1971 (aged 27) |
| 3 | DF | (Honduras) Reynaldo Clavasquín | 28 January 1972 (aged 27) |
| 4 | DF | (Honduras) Júnior Izaguirre | 12 August 1979 (aged 19) |
| 5 | DF | (Honduras) Milton Reyes | 2 May 1974 (aged 25) |
| 6 | DF | (Honduras) Ninrrol Medina | 26 August 1976 (aged 22) |
| 12 | DF | (Honduras) Iván Guerrero | 30 November 1977 (aged 21) |
| 17 | MF | (Honduras) Mario Chirinos | 29 July 1978 (aged 20) |
| 18 | DF | (Honduras) Jairo Martínez | 14 May 1978 (aged 21) |
| 20 | MF | (Honduras) Amado Guevara | 2 May 1976 (aged 23) |
| – | GK | (Honduras) Hugo Caballero | 14 November 1974 (aged 24) |
| – | DF | (Honduras) Robel Bernárdez | 8 June 1972 (aged 27) |
| – | DF | (Honduras) Juan Raudales | 15 July 1979 (aged 19) |
| – | MF | (Honduras) Carlos Muñoz | – |
| – | MF | (Honduras) Óscar Lagos | 17 June 1973 (aged 26) |
| – | MF | (Honduras) Carlos Salinas | 20 September 1978 (aged 20) |
| – | MF | (Honduras) José Romero | 3 March 1973 (aged 26) |
| – | FW | (Argentina) Gustavo Fuentes | 8 April 1973 (aged 26) |

== Results ==
All times are local CST unless stated otherwise

=== Apertura ===
| 18 September 1999 Week 1 | Motagua | 2–0 | Platense | Tegucigalpa |
| 16:00 | | | | Stadium: Estadio Tiburcio Carías Andino |

| 25 September 1999 Week 2 | Olimpia | 0–0 | Motagua | Tegucigalpa |
| 19:30 | | | | Stadium: Estadio Tiburcio Carías Andino |

| 30 September 1999 Week 3 | Motagua | 8–2 | Vida | Tegucigalpa |
| 19:30 | | | | Stadium: Estadio Tiburcio Carías Andino |

| 3 October 1999 Week 4 | Motagua | 0–0 | Real España | Tegucigalpa |
| 16:00 | | | | Stadium: Estadio Tiburcio Carías Andino |

| 10 October 1999 Week 5 | Federal | 2–7 | Motagua | Tegucigalpa |
| 16:00 | Colón; Martínez | | Clavasquín; Fuentes; Guevara | Stadium: Estadio Tiburcio Carías Andino |

| 17 October 1999 Week 6 | Victoria | 1–1 | Motagua | La Ceiba |
| 15:00 | | | | Stadium: Estadio Nilmo Edwards |

| 20 October 1999 Week 7 | Motagua | 1–0 | Universidad | Tegucigalpa |
| 18:00 | | | | Stadium: Estadio Tiburcio Carías Andino |

| 24 October 1999 Week 8 | Broncos | 1–2 | Motagua | Choluteca |
| 15:00 | | | | Stadium: Estadio Fausto Flores Lagos |

| 30 October 1999 Week 9 | Motagua | 1–0 | Marathón | Tegucigalpa |
| 19:30 | | | | Stadium: Estadio Tiburcio Carías Andino |

| 7 November 1999 Week 10 | Platense | 2–2 | Motagua | Puerto Cortés |
| 15:00 | | | | Stadium: Estadio Excélsior |

| 14 November 1999 Week 11 | Motagua | 0–2 | Olimpia | Tegucigalpa |
| 16:00 | | | | Stadium: Estadio Tiburcio Carías Andino |

| 17 November 1999 Week 12 | Vida | 0–2 | Motagua | La Ceiba |
| 19:30 | | | | Stadium: Estadio Nilmo Edwards |

| 20 November 1999 Week 13 | Real España | 0–4 | Motagua | San Pedro Sula |
| 19:30 | | | | Stadium: Estadio General Francisco Morazán |

| 28 November 1999 Week 14 | Motagua | 1–1 | Federal | Tegucigalpa |
| 16:00 | | | | Stadium: Estadio Tiburcio Carías Andino |

| 4 December 1999 Week 15 | Motagua | 2–1 | Victoria | Tegucigalpa |
| 19:30 | | | | Stadium: Estadio Tiburcio Carías Andino |

| 9 December 1999 Week 16 | Universidad | 0–0 | Motagua | Tegucigalpa |
| 19:30 | | | | Stadium: Estadio Tiburcio Carías Andino |

| 12 December 1999 Week 17 | Motagua | 3–1 | Broncos | Tegucigalpa |
| 16:00 | | | | Stadium: Estadio Tiburcio Carías Andino |

| 18 December 1999 Week 18 | Marathón | 3–3 | Motagua | San Pedro Sula |
| 19:30 | | | | Stadium: Estadio General Francisco Morazán |

| 6 January 2000 Hexagonal | Vida | 1–1 | Motagua | La Ceiba |
| 19:30 | | | | Stadium: Estadio Nilmo Edwards |

| 9 January 2000 Hexagonal | Motagua | 3–2 | Vida | Tegucigalpa |
| 14:00 | | | | Stadium: Estadio Tiburcio Carías Andino |

| 12 January 2000 Semifinals | Broncos | 0–2 | Motagua | Choluteca |
| 15:00 | | | | Stadium: Estadio Fausto Flores Lagos |

| 16 January 2000 Semifinals | Motagua | 0–0 | Broncos | Tegucigalpa |
| 16:00 | | | | Stadium: Estadio Tiburcio Carías Andino |

| 19 January 2000 Final | Olimpia | 0–0 | Motagua | Tegucigalpa |
| 19:30 | | | | Stadium: Estadio Tiburcio Carías Andino |

| 23 January 2000 Final | Motagua | 0–0 (6–5 p) | Olimpia | Tegucigalpa |
| 16:00 | | | | Stadium: Estadio Tiburcio Carías Andino |

=== Clausura ===
| 12 March 2000 Week 1 | Broncos | 0–0 | Motagua | Choluteca |
| 15:00 | | | | Stadium: Estadio Fausto Flores Lagos |

| 18 March 2000 Week 2 | Motagua | 2–1 | Universidad | Tegucigalpa |
| 19:30 | | | | Stadium: Estadio Tiburcio Carías Andino |

| 4 April 2000 Week 3 | Motagua | 0–0 | Marathón | Tegucigalpa |
| 19:30 | | | | Stadium: Estadio Tiburcio Carías Andino |

| 26 March 2000 Week 4 | Vida | 3–1 | Motagua | La Ceiba |
| 15:00 | | | | Stadium: Estadio Nilmo Edwards |

| 26 April 2000 Week 5 | Motagua | 3–3 | Platense | Tegucigalpa |
| 19:30 | | | | Stadium: Estadio Tiburcio Carías Andino |

| 8 April 2000 Week 6 | Victoria | 0–0 | Motagua | La Ceiba |
| 19:30 | | | | Stadium: Estadio Nilmo Edwards |

| 9 May 2000 Week 7 | Motagua | 1–1 | Federal | Tegucigalpa |
| 19:30 | Ramírez 42' | | ?' (pen.) Correia | Stadium: Estadio Tiburcio Carías Andino |

| 29 April 2000 Week 8 | Real España | 1–1 | Motagua | San Pedro Sula |
| 19:30 | | | | Stadium: Estadio General Francisco Morazán |

| 13 May 2000 Week 9 | Olimpia | 0–1 | Motagua | Tegucigalpa |
| 19:30 | | | 84' Izaguirre | Stadium: Estadio Tiburcio Carías Andino |

| 17 May 2000 Week 10 | Motagua | 1–0 | Broncos | Tegucigalpa |
| 19:30 | | | | Stadium: Estadio Tiburcio Carías Andino |

| 24 May 2000 Week 11 | Universidad | 0–3 | Motagua | Tegucigalpa |
| 19:30 | | | | Stadium: Estadio Tiburcio Carías Andino |

| 27 May 2000 Week 12 | Marathón | 2–0 | Motagua | San Pedro Sula |
| 19:30 | | | | Stadium: Estadio General Francisco Morazán |

| 25 June 2000 Week 13 | Motagua | 1–0 | Vida | Tegucigalpa |
| 16:00 | | | | Stadium: Estadio Tiburcio Carías Andino |

| 7 June 2000 Week 14 | Platense | 1–3 | Motagua | Puerto Cortés |
| 19:30 | | | Fuentes | Stadium: Estadio Excélsior |

| 11 June 2000 Week 15 | Motagua | 2–1 | Victoria | Tegucigalpa |
| 16:00 | | | | Stadium: Estadio Tiburcio Carías Andino |

| 28 June 2000 Week 16 | Federal | 1–2 | Motagua | Tegucigalpa |
| 19:30 | Castellanos | | Moles; Rojas | Stadium: Estadio Tiburcio Carías Andino |

| 21 June 2000 Week 17 | Motagua | 2–0 | Real España | Tegucigalpa |
| 19:30 | | | | Stadium: Estadio Tiburcio Carías Andino |

| 2 July 2000 Week 18 | Motagua | 3–3 | Olimpia | Tegucigalpa |
| 16:00 | Clavasquín 9'; Guevara; Fuentes | | 1' Tosello; 90' Oseguera | Stadium: Estadio Tiburcio Carías Andino; Attendance: 10,500; Referee: Óscar Bardales |

| 6 July 2000 Hexagonal | Victoria | 1–2 | Motagua | La Ceiba |
| 19:30 | | | | Stadium: Estadio Nilmo Edwards |

| 9 July 2000 Hexagonal | Motagua | 2–1 | Victoria | Tegucigalpa |
| 14:00 | | | | Stadium: Estadio Tiburcio Carías Andino |

| 27 July 2000 Semifinals | Motagua | 1–1 | Marathón | Tegucigalpa |
| 19:30 | | | | Stadium: Estadio Tiburcio Carías Andino |

| 30 July 2000 Semifinals | Marathón | 1–1 | Motagua | San Pedro Sula |
| 16:00 | Naif | | 89' Rojas | Stadium: Estadio General Francisco Morazán |

| 20 August 2000 Final | Motagua | 1–1 | Olimpia | Tegucigalpa |
| 16:00 | Moles 83' | | 85' Caballero | Stadium: Estadio Tiburcio Carías Andino |

| 26 August 2000 Final | Olimpia | 1–1 (2–3 p) | Motagua | Tegucigalpa |
| 19:30 | Tosello ?' (pen.) | | ?' (pen.) Clavasquín | Stadium: Estadio Tiburcio Carías Andino |

=== UNCAF Interclub Cup ===
| 21 February 1999 | Juventus (Belize) | 0–0 | (Honduras) Motagua | Orange Walk Town, Belize |
| | | | | Stadium: Orange Walk People's Stadium; Referee: Starting XI: Valladares; Reyes; Arzú; Clavasquín; Guerrero; Medina; Guevara (substituted off); Coello; Romero (substituted off); Martínez (substituted off); Ramírez; Substitutes; Chirinos (substituted in); Rodríguez (substituted in); Salinas (substituted in) |

| 24 February 1999 | Motagua (Honduras) | 2–1 | (El Salvador) Luis Ángel Firpo | Tegucigalpa, Honduras |
| | Reyes 16'; Clavasquín 18' | | 4' Rodríguez | Stadium: Estadio Tiburcio Carías Andino |

| 3 March 1999 | Motagua (Honduras) | 1–1 | (Costa Rica) Saprissa | Tegucigalpa, Honduras |
| | Ramírez 6' | | 71' (pen.) Saraiva | Stadium: Estadio Tiburcio Carías Andino |

| 19 May 1999 | Comunicaciones (Guatemala) | 0–0 | (Honduras) Motagua | Guatemala City, Guatemala |
| | | | | Stadium: Estadio Cementos Progreso |

| 18 July 1999 | Motagua (Honduras) | 1–1 | (Belize) Juventus | Tegucigalpa, Honduras |
| | Clavasquín 14' | | 61' Flowers | Stadium: Estadio Tiburcio Carías Andino; Referee: Starting XI: Caballero; Reyes; Clavasquín; Medina; O. Guevara (substituted off); Lagos; A. Guevara; Romero (substituted off); Raudales; Fuentes (substituted off); Ramírez; Substitutes; Katongo (substituted in); Bernárdez (substituted in); Muñóz (substituted in) |

| 25 July 1999 | Luis Ángel Firpo (El Salvador) | 1–0 | (Honduras) Motagua | Usulután, El Salvador |
| | Rodríguez 60' | | | Stadium: Sergio Torres Stadium |

| 1 August 1999 | Saprissa (Costa Rica) | 2–0 | (Honduras) Motagua | San José, Costa Rica |
| | Centeno 31'; Santana 62' | | | Stadium: Estadio Ricardo Saprissa Aymá |

| 15 August 1999 | Motagua (Honduras) | v | (Guatemala) Comunicaciones | Tegucigalpa, Honduras |
| | | | | Stadium: Estadio Tiburcio Carías Andino |
Note: Match cancelled due to lack of interest.

=== By round ===
| Round | 1 | 2 | 3 | 4 | 5 | 6 | 7 | 8 | 9 | 10 | 11 | 12 | 13 | 14 | 15 | 16 | 17 | 18 | 19 | 20 | 21 | 22 | 23 | 24 | 25 | 26 | 27 | 28 | 29 | 30 | 31 | 32 | 33 | 34 | 35 | 36 |
|---|---|---|---|---|---|---|---|---|---|---|---|---|---|---|---|---|---|---|---|---|---|---|---|---|---|---|---|---|---|---|---|---|---|---|---|---|
| Ground | H | A | H | H | A | A | H | A | H | A | H | A | A | H | H | A | H | A | A | H | H | A | H | A | H | A | A | H | A | A | H | A | H | A | H | H |
| Result | W | D | W | D | W | D | W | W | W | D | L | W | W | D | W | D | W | D | D | W | D | L | D | D | D | D | W | W | W | L | W | W | W | W | W | D |
| Position | 2 | 3 | 1 | 1 | 1 | 1 | 1 | 1 | 1 | 1 | 1 | 1 | 1 | 1 | 1 | 1 | 1 | 1 | 1 | 1 | 1 | 2 | 2 | 2 | 2 | 2 | 1 | 1 | 1 | 2 | 2 | 1 | 1 | 1 | 1 | 1 |

A = Away; H = Home; W = Win; D = Draw; L = Loss

== Statistics ==
- As of 26 August 2000

| Competition | GP | GW | GD | GL | GS | GC | GD | CS | SG | Per |
|---|---|---|---|---|---|---|---|---|---|---|
| League | 48 | 23 | 22 | 3 | 65 | 33 | +32 | 20 | 11 | 63.19% |
| Copa Interclubes UNCAF | 7 | 1 | 4 | 2 | 4 | 6 | –2 | 2 | 4 | 19.19% |
| Others | 0 | 0 | 0 | 0 | 0 | 0 | 0 | 0 | 0 | 0.00% |
| Totals | 55 | 24 | 26 | 5 | 69 | 39 | +30 | 22 | 15 | 59.39% |
