= 1998–99 Honduran Liga Nacional =

Liga Nacional
- Season: 1998-99
- Champions: Olimpia (14th title)
- Runner up: Real España
- Relegated: Real Maya
- CONCACAF Champions Cup: Olimpia; Real España
- UNCAF Interclub Cup: Olimpia; Real España
- Top goalscorer: Sergio Machado (11)

Although the tournament was played from January to July 1999, this is officially known as the 1998–99 season in the Honduran football league, it was also the last non-Apertura-Clausura format season played. Club Deportivo Olimpia conquered its 14th title in its history.

== 1998–99 teams ==
- Broncos (promoted)
- Marathón
- Motagua
- Olimpia
- Platense
- Universidad
- Real España
- Real Maya
- Victoria
- Vida

== Regular season ==
- Also serves as 1998 Honduran Cup

=== Standings ===
Pos	Team	Pld	W	D	L	GF	GA	GD	Pts	Qualification or relegation
1	Olimpia (Note: Olimpia declared 1998 Honduran Cup champions as winner of regular season.)	18	7	9	2	28	13	+15	30	Qualified to the Final round (Note: Top 6 qualify for final round.)
2	Motagua	18	7	7	4	24	20	+4	28	Qualified to the Final round
3	Universidad	18	7	6	5	24	21	+3	27	Qualified to the Final round
4	Real España	18	5	11	2	24	18	+6	26	Qualified to the Final round
5	Victoria	18	6	7	5	25	22	+3	25	Qualified to the Final round
6	Platense	18	7	4	7	23	31	−8	25	Qualified to the Final round
7	Marathón	18	4	9	5	16	16	0	21	
8	Broncos	18	4	8	6	17	22	−5	20	
9	Vida	18	4	4	10	22	32	−10	16	
10	Real Maya	18	2	9	7	12	15	−3	15	Relegated to the Liga de Ascenso (Note: Real Maya relegated to second division.)

=== Results ===
As of 12 May 1999

Home \ Away	BRO	MAR	MOT	OLI	PLA	RES	RMA	UNI	VIC	VID
Broncos	—	0–0	0–1	2–0	3–0	1–1	1–1	0–2	1–1	2–1
Marathón	1–1	—	2–0	0–2	2–3	1–0	0–0	0–1	0–0	2–2
Motagua	2–1	2–1	—	1–1	4–1	0–0	2–0	1–1	1–1	4–2
Olimpia	4–0	0–0	4–1	—	0–0	1–1	1–1	2–1	1–1	2–1
Platense	1–2	0–2	2–1	1–1	—	3–3	1–0	2–1	2–1	1–0
Real España	2–0	1–1	1–0	0–0	2–2	—	3–2	1–1	3–1	1–1
Real Maya	0–0	1–1	0–0	0–2	1–2	0–0	—	1–0	1–1	2–3
Universidad	1–1	1–1	2–2	2–1	2–1	1–0	0–0	—	3–2	4–1
Victoria	2–0	1–0	1–1	1–1	3–0	2–4	2–1	3–1	—	1–0
Vida	2–2	1–2	0–1	0–5	3–1	1–1	0–1	2–0	2–1	—

Updated to match(es) played on 12 May 1999. Source: RSSSF
Legend: Blue = home team win; Yellow = draw; Red = away team win.
For upcoming matches, an "a" indicates there is an article about the rivalry between the two participants.

== Final round ==
=== Hexagonal ===
30 May 1999 Hexagonal	Platense	0–0	Olimpia	Puerto Cortés
				Stadium: Estadio Excélsior

6 June 1999 Hexagonal	Olimpia	3–0	Platense	Tegucigalpa
16:00				Stadium: Estadio Tiburcio Carías Andino; Attendance: 29,728

- Olimpia won 3–0 on aggregate.

29 May 1999 Hexagonal	Victoria	2–1	Motagua	La Ceiba
				Stadium: Estadio Nilmo Edwards

6 June 1999 Hexagonal	Motagua	2–1	Victoria	Tegucigalpa
14:00				Stadium: Estadio Tiburcio Carías Andino; Attendance: 29,728

- Motagua 3–3 Victoria on aggregate. Motagua advanced on regular season record. Victoria advanced as best loser.

29 May 1999 Hexagonal	Real España	2–0	Universidad	San Pedro Sula
				Stadium: Estadio Francisco Morazán

3 June 1999 Hexagonal	Universidad	2–1	Real España	Tegucigalpa
				Stadium: Estadio Tiburcio Carías Andino

- Real España won 3–2 on aggregate.

=== Semifinals ===
12 June 1999 Semifinals	Victoria	0–0	Olimpia	La Ceiba
				Stadium: Estadio Nilmo Edwards

20 June 1999 Semifinals	Olimpia	1–1	Victoria	Tegucigalpa
	Suazo		Carson	Stadium: Estadio Tiburcio Carías Andino

- Olimpia 1–1 Victoria on aggregate. Olimpia advanced on regular season record.

12 June 1999 Semifinals	Real España	3–0	Motagua	San Pedro Sula
	Hernández; Cabrera			Stadium: Estadio Francisco Morazán

20 June 1999 Semifinals	Motagua	2–1	Real España	Tegucigalpa
				Stadium: Estadio Tiburcio Carías Andino

- Real España won 4–2 on aggregate.

=== Final ===
10 July 1999 Final	Real España	1–1	Olimpia	San Pedro Sula
19:30	Ramírez		Caballero	Stadium: Estadio Francisco Morazán; Referee: Marcio Carranza

17 July 1999 Final	Olimpia	1–0	Real España	Tegucigalpa
19:30	Costa 39'			Stadium: Estadio Tiburcio Carías Andino; Attendance: 34,000

- Olimpia won 2–1 on aggregate.

== Top scorer ==
- (Brazil) Sergio Machado (Platense) with 11 goals

== Squads ==
Broncos
(Honduras) Gustavo Gallegos	(Brazil) Marcelo Ferreira Martins	(Honduras) Marlon Javier Monge
(Honduras) Martín Castro	(Honduras) Marco Vinicio "Chacal" Ortega	(Honduras) José Ulloa Villatoro
Marathón
(Honduras) Josué Reyes	(Costa Rica) Pedro Cubillo	(Honduras) Juan Pablo Centeno
(Honduras) Pompilio Cacho Valerio	(Honduras) Frank García	(Honduras) Walter "Gualala" Trejo
(Honduras) Darwin Pacheco	(Argentina) Damián Garófalo	(Belize) Norman "Tilimán" Núñez
(Honduras) Edwin Alexander Medina	(Honduras) Behiker Bustillo	(Honduras) Jaime Rosales
(Honduras) Mauricio Sabillón
Motagua
(Honduras) Hugo Caballero	(Honduras) Noel Valladares	(Honduras) Mario Iván Guerrero Ramírez
(Honduras) Amado "Lobo" Guevara	(Honduras) Milton "Jocón" Reyes	(Honduras) Hernaín Arzú
(Honduras) Reynaldo Clavasquín	(Honduras) José Francisco Ramírez	(Honduras) Mario Chirinos
(Honduras) Óscar Lagos	(Nigeria) Joseph Katongo	(Honduras) Carlos Muñoz
(Honduras) Juan Carlos Raudales	(Honduras) Ninrrol Medina	(Honduras) Juan Manuel "Gato" Coello
(Honduras) Ramón Romero	(Honduras) Jairo "Kikí" Martínez	(Honduras) German "Ñato" Rodríguez
(Honduras) Carlos Salinas	(Honduras) Ovidio Guevara	(Argentina) Gustavo Fuentes
(Honduras) Robel Bernárdez	(Sierra Leone) Abdul Thompson
Olimpia
(Argentina) Carlos Enrique Prono	(Honduras) Héctor Medina	(Honduras) Nahúm Alberto Espinoza Zerón
(Brazil) Denilson Costa de Oliveira	(Honduras) Wilmer Neal "Matador" Velásquez	(Honduras) Gregorio Serrano
(Honduras) Fabio Ulloa	(Honduras) Jorge Samuel Caballero	(Honduras) Oscar David Suazo Velásquez
(Honduras) Christian Santamaría	(Honduras) Merlyn Membreño	(Honduras) Alex Pineda Chacón
(Honduras) Rudy Alberto Williams	(Honduras) Troy Anderson	(Honduras) César Henríquez
(Argentina) Alejandro Kenig	(Honduras) César Colón	(Honduras) Marlon "Pitufo" Hernández
(Honduras) Enrique Reneau	(Brazil) Rodinei Martins
Platense
(Brazil) Marcio Machado de Lima	(Honduras) Marco Antonio Mejía	(Honduras) José Luis "Runga" Piota
(Panama) Ricardo James	(Honduras) Jorge Arita Neal	(Panama) Antony Torres
(Honduras) Limber Pérez	(Honduras) Rony Morales	(Honduras) Hernan Centeno Bátiz
(Honduras) Julio Cesar "Rambo" D. Leon	(Argentina) Gustavo Fuentes	(Honduras) Juan Manuel Carcamo
(Honduras) Franklin Zambrano	(Brazil) Carlos Dasilva
Real Maya
(Honduras) Nelson Rolando Rosales	(Honduras) Jorge Ernesto Pineda	(Honduras) Marvin Fonseca
(Honduras) Luis Lagos	(Argentina) Horacio Aquino	(Honduras) Nigel Zúniga
(Honduras) Guillermo Ramírez	(Honduras) Noel Flores	(Argentina) Leonardo Svagher
(Honduras) Jorge Reyes	(Honduras) Lenín Suárez	(Colombia) Andrés Vallecilla
(Honduras) David Quezada	(Honduras) Víctor Zúniga	(Honduras) Víctor Carrasco
Real España
(Honduras) Wilmer Enrique "Supermán" Cruz	(Honduras) Luis Enrique "Gavilán" Cálix	(Honduras) David Cárcamo
(Honduras) César Clother	(Honduras) Ricky Denis García	(Honduras) Orbin "Pato" Cabrera
(Honduras) Alex Roberto Bailey	(Honduras) Edgar Rolando Delgado Guevara	(Honduras) José Francisco Suazo
(Uruguay) Washington Leonardo "Piojo" Hernández	(Honduras) Javier Rodríguez	(Honduras) Mario "Pescado" Rodríguez
(Honduras) Héctor Gutiérrez	(Honduras) Francis Reyes	(Honduras) Luis "Bombero" Ramírez
(Honduras) Miguel Angel "Gallo" Mariano	(Honduras) Jorge Humberto Zapata	(Honduras) Milton "Chocolate" Flores
(Panama) Roberto Brown	(Panama) Alberto Zapata
Universidad
(Argentina) Guillermo César Sumich
Victoria
(Honduras) Renán Cristino Bengoché	(Honduras) Fabricio Pérez	(Honduras) Francisco Antonio Pavón
(Honduras) Mauricio Edgardo Figueroa
Vida
(Honduras) Geovany Arzú	(Honduras) Carlos Alvarado	(Honduras) René Arturo David "Pupa" Martínez
(Honduras) Marvin Brown James	(Honduras) Carlos Güity	(Honduras) Jorge Arnaldo Ocampo
(Honduras) José Luis Batiz	(Argentina) Diego de Rosa	(Honduras) Juan José Bonifacio
(Uruguay) Álvaro Roberto Izquierdo	(Honduras) Clayd Lester Marson	(Honduras) Renán "Chimbo" Aguilera Contreras
(Uruguay) Ariel Pérez	(Honduras) José Antonio García	(Honduras) Walter Argueta
(Honduras) Geovany "Venado" Castro	(Brazil) Rigoberto Marinho Echenique

== Controversy ==
- Olimpia had field Wilmer Velásquez on the Final round illegally against Platense and Victoria, the "Jaibos" protested the irregularity without success and Olimpia won the championship.
