= 1999–2000 Honduran Liga Nacional =

Liga Nacional
- Season: 1999–2000
- Champions: Apertura: Motagua; Clausura: Motagua
- Relegated: Federal
- Copa Interclubes UNCAF: Motagua; Olimpia
- Matches: 204
- Goals: 507 (2.49 per match)
- Top goalscorer: Apertura: Wilmer Velásquez (12); Clausura: Juan Cárcamo (14)
- Biggest home win: Platense 8–0 Universidad (10 June 2000)
- Biggest away win: Federal 2–7 Motagua (10 October 1999)
- Highest scoring: Motagua 8–2 Vida (30 September 1999)
- All statistics correct as of 26 August 2000.

The 1999–2000 Honduran Liga Nacional was the 35th season in the Honduran top division, the tournament was divided into two halves (Apertura and Clausura) and it determined the 35th and 36th national champions in the league's history. The league games started 18 September 1999.

== 1999–2000 teams ==
- C.D. Broncos (Choluteca)
- C.D. Federal (Tegucigalpa) (promoted)
- C.D. Marathón (San Pedro Sula)
- C.D. Motagua (Tegucigalpa)
- C.D. Olimpia (Tegucigalpa)
- C.D. Platense (Puerto Cortés)
- Real C.D. España (San Pedro Sula)
- Universidad (Tegucigalpa)
- C.D. Victoria (La Ceiba)
- C.D.S. Vida (La Ceiba)

== Apertura ==
The Apertura was the opening half of 1999–2000 season in the Honduran Liga Nacional.

=== Regular season ===
==== Standings ====
Pos	Team	Pld	W	D	L	GF	GA	GD	Pts	Qualification or relegation
1	Motagua	18	10	7	1	39	16	+23	37	Qualified to the Final round
2	Olimpia	18	9	6	3	26	14	+12	33	Qualified to the Final round
3	Victoria	18	8	7	3	25	19	+6	31	Qualified to the Final round
4	Broncos	18	7	7	4	22	15	+7	28	Qualified to the Final round
5	Platense	18	6	7	5	24	24	0	25	Qualified to the Final round
6	Vida	18	6	4	8	18	30	−12	22	Qualified to the Final round
7	Universidad	18	4	7	7	20	23	−3	19	
8	Marathón	18	3	8	7	16	22	−6	17	
9	Real España	18	4	5	9	13	21	−8	17	
10	Federal	18	1	6	11	18	37	−19	9	

Updated to match(es) played on 22 December 1999. Source:

==== Results ====
As of 22 December 1999

Home \ Away	BRO	FED	MAR	MOT	OLI	PLA	RES	UNI	VIC	VID
Broncos		3–0	2–0	1–2	0–0	2–1	1–0	2–0	1–1	2–0
Federal	1–1		0–1	2–7	0–3	1–2	2–0	2–2	1–3	1–2
Marathón	1–1	3–3		3–3	1–1	0–0	3–2	1–2	0–0	1–1
Motagua	3–1	1–1	1–0		0–2	2–0	0–0	1–0	2–1	8–2
Olimpia	1–1	3–1	1–0	0–0		4–3	0–0	3–1	1–2	2–0
Platense	2–1	1–1	0–0	2–2	0–2		2–0	1–1	1–1	2–1
Real España	1–1	1–0	0–1	0–4	3–0	0–2		2–3	2–0	2–1
Universidad	0–1	1–1	2–0	0–0	0–2	1–1	0–0		5–1	0–2
Victoria	1–0	1–0	1–0	1–1	1–1	5–2	0–0	2–1		3–0
Vida	1–1	2–1	2–1	0–2	1–0	0–2	1–0	1–1	1–1	

Source: RSSSF
Legend: Blue = home team win; Yellow = draw; Red = away team win.

=== Final round ===
==== Hexagonal ====
===== Motagua vs Vida =====
6 January 2000 1st leg	Vida	1–1	Motagua	La Ceiba, Atlántida
19:30 (UTC−06:00)				Stadium: Estadio Nilmo Edwards

9 January 2000 2nd leg	Motagua	3–2	Vida	Tegucigalpa, Francisco Morazán
16:00 (UTC−06:00)				Stadium: Estadio Tiburcio Carías Andino

- Motagua won 4–3 on aggregate.

===== Olimpia vs Platense =====
5 January 2000 1st leg	Platense	2–2	Olimpia	Puerto Cortés, Cortés
19:30 (UTC−06:00)	Cárcamo; Scott		Martins; Chacón	Stadium: Estadio Excélsior

9 January 2000 2nd leg	Olimpia	0–0	Platense	Tegucigalpa, Francisco Morazán
14:00 (UTC−06:00)				Stadium: Estadio Tiburcio Carías Andino

- Olimpia 2–2 Platense on aggregate; Olimpia advanced on better regular season record.

===== Victoria vs Broncos =====
5 January 2000 1st leg	Broncos	3–2	Victoria	Choluteca, Choluteca
15:00 (UTC−06:00)				Stadium: Estadio Fausto Flores Lagos

8 January 2000 2nd leg	Victoria	1–0	Broncos	La Ceiba, Atlántida
19:30 (UTC−06:00)				Stadium: Estadio Nilmo Edwards

- Victoria 3–3 Broncos on aggregate; Victoria advanced on better regular season record; Broncos advanced as best loser.

==== Semifinals ====
===== Motagua vs Broncos =====
12 January 2000 1st leg	Broncos	0–2	Motagua	Choluteca, Choluteca
15:30 (UTC−06:00)			Guevara 18'; Fuentes 40'	Stadium: Estadio Fausto Flores Lagos; Attendance: 4,000

16 January 2000 2nd leg	Motagua	0–0	Broncos	Tegucigalpa, Francisco Morazán
16:00 (UTC−06:00)				Stadium: Estadio Tiburcio Carías Andino

- Motagua won 2–0 on aggregate.

===== Olimpia vs Victoria =====
12 January 2000 1st leg	Victoria	1–0	Olimpia	La Ceiba, Atlántida
19:30 (UTC−06:00)	Perdomo 87'			Stadium: Estadio Nilmo Edwards; Attendance: 11,327

15 January 2000 2nd leg	Olimpia	2–0	Victoria	Tegucigalpa, Francisco Morazán
19:30 (UTC−06:00)	Caballero 3'; Martins 75'			Stadium: Estadio Tiburcio Carías Andino; Attendance: 18,000

- Olimpia won 2–1 on aggregate.

==== Final ====
===== Motagua vs Olimpia =====
19 January 2000 1st leg	Olimpia	0–0	Motagua	Tegucigalpa, Francisco Morazán
16:00 (UTC−06:00)				Stadium: Estadio Tiburcio Carías Andino; Attendance: 24,351; Referee: Óscar Bardales

23 January 2000 2nd leg	Motagua	0–0 (6–5 p)	Olimpia	Tegucigalpa, Francisco Morazán
16:00 (UTC−06:00)				Stadium: Estadio Tiburcio Carías Andino; Attendance: 34,044; Referee: Marcio Carranza
	Penalties
	Clavasquín (penalty missed); Guevara (penalty scored); Chirinos (penalty scored); Romero (penalty scored); Coello (penalty scored); Fuentes (penalty scored); Medina (penalty scored)		(penalty scored) Cruz; (penalty missed) Martins; (penalty missed) Williams

- Motagua 0–0 Olimpia on aggregate; Motagua won by penalty shootouts.

=== Top scorer ===
- (Honduras) Wilmer Velásquez (Olimpia) with 12 goals.

== Clausura ==
The Clausura tournament of the 1999–2000 season in the Liga Nacional de Fútbol de Honduras started on 11 March 2000 at San Pedro Sula with a scoreless match between C.D. Marathón and C.D. Platense.

=== Regular season ===
==== Standings ====
Pos	Team	Pld	W	D	L	GF	GA	GD	Pts	Qualification or relegation
1	Olimpia	18	11	5	2	27	14	+13	38	Qualified to the Final round
2	Platense	18	10	4	4	39	21	+18	34	Qualified to the Final round
3	Motagua	18	9	7	2	26	17	+9	34	Qualified to the Final round
4	Victoria	18	6	6	6	25	21	+4	24	Qualified to the Final round
5	Marathón	18	6	4	8	24	22	+2	22	Qualified to the Final round
6	Federal	18	5	7	6	26	29	−3	22	Qualified to the Final round
7	Broncos	18	6	4	8	20	25	−5	22	
8	Real España	18	3	7	8	14	22	−8	16	
9	Universidad	18	3	7	8	18	36	−18	16	
10	Vida	18	3	5	10	18	30	−12	14	

Updated to match(es) played on 2 July 2000. Source:

==== Results ====
As of 2 July 2000

Home \ Away	BRO	FED	MAR	MOT	OLI	PLA	RES	UNI	VIC	VID
Broncos		1–0	2–0	0–0	4–2	1–0	1–0	1–1	0–1	3–2
Federal	5–2		4–2	1–2	1–1	0–2	0–0	2–1	0–0	3–2
Marathón	2–2	1–2		2–0	0–3	0–0	2–0	0–1	2–0	6–1
Motagua	1–0	1–1	0–0		3–3	3–3	2–0	2–1	2–1	1–0
Olimpia	1–0	2–0	1–0	0–1		0–0	2–0	3–2	2–1	0–0
Platense	3–1	4–2	3–1	1–3	1–3		0–0	8–0	3–2	3–2
Real España	2–1	2–2	0–1	1–1	0–1	0–2		2–1	3–1	1–1
Universidad	0–0	2–2	2–1	0–3	1–1	1–4	1–1		0–3	1–0
Victoria	3–0	4–1	1–1	0–0	0–1	2–1	1–1	2–2		1–0
Vida	2–1	0–0	0–3	3–1	0–1	0–1	2–1	1–1	2–2	

Source: RSSSF
Legend: Blue = home team win; Yellow = draw; Red = away team win.
- Marathón–Real España suspended at 70' (2–0) as Real España had five players sent off. Result stood.

=== Final round ===
==== Hexagonal ====
===== Olimpia vs Federal =====
6 July 2000 1st leg	Federal	1–0	Olimpia	Tegucigalpa, Francisco Morazán
19:30 (UTC−06:00)				Stadium: Estadio Tiburcio Carías Andino

9 July 2000 2nd leg	Olimpia	4–0	Federal	Tegucigalpa, Francisco Morazán
16:00 (UTC−06:00)				Stadium: Estadio Tiburcio Carías Andino

- Olimpia won 4–1 on aggregate; Federal advanced as best losers.

===== Platense vs Marathón =====
6 July 2000 1st leg	Marathón	2–1	Platense	San Pedro Sula, Cortés
19:30 (UTC−06:00)	Rudman; Naif		Cárcamo	Stadium: Estadio Olímpico Metropolitano

9 July 2000 2nd leg	Platense	0–0	Marathón	Puerto Cortés, Cortés
15:00 (UTC−06:00)				Stadium: Estadio Excélsior

- Marathón won 2–1 on aggregate.

===== Motagua vs Victoria =====
6 July 2000 1st leg	Victoria	1–2	Motagua	La Ceiba, Atlántida
19:30 (UTC−06:00)				Stadium: Estadio Nilmo Edwards

9 July 2000 2nd leg	Motagua	2–1	Victoria	Tegucigalpa, Francisco Morazán
14:00 (UTC−06:00)				Stadium: Estadio Tiburcio Carías Andino

- Motagua won 4–2 on aggregate.

==== Semifinals ====
===== Olimpia vs Federal =====
26 July 2000 1st leg	Federal	1–2	Olimpia	Tegucigalpa, Francisco Morazán
19:30 (UTC−06:00)				Stadium: Estadio Tiburcio Carías Andino

26 July 2000 2nd leg	Olimpia	2–0	Federal	Tegucigalpa, Francisco Morazán
16:00 (UTC−06:00)				Stadium: Estadio Tiburcio Carías Andino

- Olimpia won 4–1 on aggregate.

===== Motagua vs Marathón =====
Note: Motagua (3rd) had the right to play the second leg at home after finishing above Marathón (5th) in the regular season; Marathón however claimed they had to close the series at home after they defeated Platense in the Hexagonal who finished 2nd; eventually Motagua granted home-field advantage in the second leg at San Pedro Sula.

27 July 2000 1st leg	Motagua	1–1	Marathón	Tegucigalpa, Francisco Morazán
19:30 (UTC−06:00)	Guevara (?)		González	Stadium: Estadio Tiburcio Carías Andino; Referee: Argelio Sabillón

30 July 2000 2nd leg	Marathón	1–1	Motagua	San Pedro Sula, Cortés
16:00 (UTC−06:00)	Naif		Rojas 88'	Stadium: Estadio Francisco Morazán

- Motagua 2–2 Marathón on aggregate; Motagua advanced on better regular season record.

==== Final ====
===== Olimpia vs Motagua =====
20 August 2000
16:00 (UTC−06:00)

Motagua	1–1	Olimpia
Moles 83'		Caballero 85'

Estadio Tiburcio Carías Andino
Tegucigalpa
Attendance: 19,526
Referee: Vivian Rodríguez

26 August 2000
19:30 (UTC−06:00)

Olimpia	1–1	Motagua
Tosello 57' (pen.)		Clavasquín 79' (pen.)
Penalties
	2–3

Estadio Tiburcio Carías Andino
Tegucigalpa
Attendance: 37,371 (3,673,740.00 L)
Referee: Argelio Sabillón

Olimpia	Motagua

GK	–	(Argentina) Carlos Prono
RB	–	(Honduras) Rudy Williams
CB	–	(Honduras) Gregorio Serrano
CB	–	(Honduras) Merlyn Membreño
LB	–	(Honduras) Samuel Caballero
CM	–	(Honduras) Cristian Santamaría
CM	–	(Honduras) José Pineda
CM	–	(Honduras) Alex Pineda
AM	–	(Argentina) Danilo Tosello
CF	–	(Brazil) Denilson Costa
CF	–	(Honduras) Wilmer Velásquez
Substitutions:
FW	–	(Honduras) Eduardo Arriola	Substituted on
MF	–	(Honduras) Néstor Peralta	Substituted on
MF	–	(Honduras) Carlos Paez	Substituted on
Manager:
(Uruguay) Julio González

GK	–	(Argentina) Diego Vásquez
RB	–	(Honduras) Jorge Lozano
CB	–	(Honduras) Reynaldo Clavasquín
CB	–	(Honduras) Elmer Montoya
LB	–	(Honduras) Iván Guerrero
CM	–	(Honduras) Oscar Lagos
CM	–	(Honduras) Mario Chirinos
AM	–	(Honduras) Amado Guevara
RF	–	(Honduras) Francisco Ramírez
CF	–	(Argentina) Gustavo Fuentes
LF	–	(Honduras) Jairo Martínez
Substitutions:
GK	–	(Honduras) Hugo Caballero	Substituted on
MF	–	(Honduras) Juan Coello	Substituted on
FW	–	(Argentina) Carlos Rojas	Substituted on
Manager:
(Honduras) Luis Reyes

=== Top scorer ===
- (Honduras) Juan Manuel Cárcamo (Platense) with 14 goals

== Relegation ==
Relegation was determined by the aggregate table of both Apertura and Clausura tournaments.

Pos	Team	Pld	W	D	L	GF	GA	GD	Pts	Qualification or relegation
1	Motagua	36	19	14	3	65	33	+32	71	Qualified to the 2001 Copa Interclubes UNCAF and 2001 CONCACAF Giants Cup (Note: Motagua qualified to the 2001 Copa Interclubes UNCAF as winner of both Apertura and Clausura tournaments. They were also invited to the 2001 CONCACAF Giants Cup as having the best attendances in the 1999–2000 season.)
2	Olimpia	36	20	11	5	53	28	+25	71	Qualified to the 2001 Copa Interclubes UNCAF (Note: Olimpia qualified to the 2001 Copa Interclubes UNCAF as best non-champion performance.)
3	Platense	36	16	11	9	63	45	+18	59	
4	Victoria	36	14	13	9	50	40	+10	55	
5	Broncos	36	13	11	12	42	40	+2	50	
6	Marathón	36	9	12	15	40	44	−4	39	
7	Vida	36	9	9	18	36	60	−24	36	
8	Universidad	36	7	14	15	38	59	−21	35	
9	Real España	36	7	12	17	27	43	−16	33	
10	Federal	36	6	13	17	44	66	−22	31	Relegated to the 2000–01 Segunda División

Updated to match(es) played on 2 July 2000. Source:

== Squads ==
Broncos
(Honduras) Juan Ramón Palacios	(Honduras) Edgar Figueroa	(Honduras) Luis Oseguera
(Honduras) Marco Ortega	(Honduras) Jorge Pineda	(Honduras) César Méndez
(Brazil) Marcelo Ferreira Martins	(Honduras) José Villatoro	(Honduras) Nelson Rosales
(Honduras) Luis Vallejo	(Honduras) José Suazo
Federal
(Honduras) Héctor Medina	(Honduras) Presley Carson	(Honduras) Orlando Rene López
(Honduras) Walter "Gualala" Trejo	(Honduras) César Colón	(Honduras) Jorge "Avioneta" Martínez
(Honduras) Marvin Fonseca	(Honduras) Miguel Arcángel Güity	(Colombia) Harold Yepes
(Honduras) Jose "Chepo" Fernández	(Honduras) Carlos Pérez	(Brazil) Ricardo Correa
(Brazil) Luis Ronaldo Bernardo	(Honduras) Rony Zelaya	(Honduras) Marvin Brown
Marathón
(Honduras) Josué Reyes	(Honduras) Hernaín Arzú	(Honduras) Jesús Romero
(Honduras) Edwin Medina	(Honduras) Maynor Suazo	(Argentina) Silvio Rudman
(Honduras) Douglas Murillo	(Honduras) Carlos Lemus	(Argentina) Carlos González
(Argentina) Alejandro Naif	(Honduras) Gerardo Aguilar	(Honduras) Marvin Brown
(Honduras) Darwin Pacheco	(Honduras) Pompilio Cacho Valerio	(Argentina) Sebastián Rudman
(Honduras) Nigel Zúniga	(Honduras) Mauricio Sabillón	(Honduras) Behiker Bustillo
(Honduras) Luis Guifarro	(Honduras) Jaime Rosales	(Honduras) José Luis López Escobar
(Honduras) Narciso Fernández
Motagua
(Argentina) Diego Martin Vásquez	(Honduras) Júnior Izaguirre	(Honduras) Ninrrod Medina
(Honduras) Amado "El Lobo" Guevara	(Honduras) Hugo Caballero	(Honduras) Reynaldo Clavasquín
(Honduras) Robel Bernárdez	(Honduras) Juan Carlos Raudales	(Honduras) Carlos "Pony" Muñoz
(Honduras) Ramón Romero "Romerito"	(Honduras) Iván Guerrero	(Honduras) Mario Chirinos
(Honduras) Jairo "Kiki" Martínez	(Argentina) Gustavo Fuentes	(Honduras) Milton "Jocon" Reyes
(Honduras) Oscar "Chicano" Lagos	(Honduras) Carlos Alberto Salinas	(Argentina) Juan Moles
(Argentina) Roberto "Tanque" Rojas	(Honduras) José Francisco Ramírez
Olimpia
(Honduras) Wilmer Velásquez	(Argentina) Carlos Prono	(Honduras) Marlon Hernández
(Honduras) Alex Pineda Chacón	(Honduras) Nahúm Espinoza	(Honduras) Elmer Marín
(Honduras) Merlyn Membreño	(Brazil) Rodinei Martins	(Honduras) Enrique Reneau
(Honduras) Samuel Caballero	(Argentina) Danilo Tosello	(Honduras) Christian Santamaría
Platense
(Panama) Ricardo James	(Honduras) Marco Mejía	(Honduras) José Luis Piota
(Brazil) Marcio Machado de Lima	(Honduras) Julio César De León	(Honduras) Hernán Centeno
(Honduras) Rubén Suazo	(Honduras) Juan Manuel Cárcamo
Real España
(Honduras) Milton "Chocolate" Flores	(Honduras) Wilmer "Superman" Cruz	(Brazil) Víctor Carneiro
(Honduras) Marlon Hernández	(Honduras) Leonardo Morales	(Honduras) Miguel Mariano
(Honduras) Luis "Bombero" Ramírez	(Honduras) Reynaldo "Chino" Pineda	(Honduras) Edgar Rolando Delgado
(Uruguay) Washington "Piojo" Hernández	(Panama) Jorge Zapata	(Honduras) Marco "Chacal" Ortega
(Honduras) Ricky Garcia	(Honduras) Leonardo "Leo" Isaula	(Honduras) Leonardo "Leo" Morales
(Honduras) David Cárcamo	(Honduras) Hector Gutiérrez	(Honduras) Mario "Pescado Rodríguez
(Honduras) Javier Rodríguez	(Honduras) Carlos Oliva	(Honduras) Orbin "Pato" Cabrera
(Honduras) Cesar "Nene" Obando
UNAH
(Honduras) Constantino Reyes	(Honduras) Hesler Phillips	(Honduras) José Luis "Runga" Piota
(Argentina) Silvio Traverso	(Honduras) Cristian González	(Honduras) Carlos Daniel Díaz
(Argentina) Juan Carlos González	(Argentina) Guillermo Sumich	(Honduras) Leonel Rodríguez
(Honduras) Elvis Danilo (Dany) Turcios	(Honduras) Aminadan Laines	(Honduras) Luis Perdomo
(Honduras) Juan Rosa Lagos	(Honduras) Camilo Bonilla Ocampo	(Honduras) Marvin Mazariegos
(Honduras) Jorge Arita Neal	(Honduras) Ricky Alcerro	(Honduras) Raul Dolmo
Victoria
(Honduras) Eugenio Dolmo Flores	(Honduras) Carlos Alberto Escobar	(Honduras) Héctor Zapata
(Honduras) Julio César Suazo	(Honduras) Renán Bengoché	(Honduras) Luis Perdomo
(Honduras) Guillermo Ramírez	(Argentina) Héctor Fernández	(Honduras) Luis Ramos
(Honduras) Nicolás Suazo	(Honduras) Marcos Bernárdez	(Honduras) Hernán Fúnez
(Honduras) Luis Lagos	(Honduras) Mauricio Figueroa	(Honduras) Cristian Martínez
(Honduras) Enrique Reneau	(Honduras) Jorge Pineda
Vida
(Honduras) Wilmer Cruz	(Honduras) Carlos Alvarado	(Honduras) Geovanny Arzú
(Honduras) Roberto Padilla	(Honduras) Renán Contreras	(Honduras) Clayd Marson
(Honduras) Jorge Ocampo	(Honduras) Francis Javier Reyes	(Honduras) Marlon Monge
(Honduras) René Martínez	(Honduras) Alberto Zapata	(Honduras) José Pacini
