= 1997–98 Honduran Liga Nacional =

Liga Nacional
- Season: 1997–98
- Champions: Apertura: Motagua (6th title); Clausura: Motagua (7th title)
- Relegated: Palestino; Independiente Villela
- Torneo Grandes de Centroamerica: Motagua; Real España; Olimpia
- Top goalscorer: Apertura: Wilmer Velásquez (19); Clausura: Amado Guevara (15)
- Biggest home win: Vida 7–2 Independiente (19 October 1997)
- Biggest away win: Independiente 1–4 Olimpia (8 July 1998); Victoria 1–4 Olimpia (9 August 1998); Real Maya 1–4 Motagua (20 September 1998)
- Highest scoring: Vida 7–2 Independiente (19 October 1997)
- All statistics correct as of 25 October 1998.

In 1997–98 the Honduran Liga Nacional brought a new competition system; the league would be now divided into two tournaments (Apertura and Clausura), having C.D. Motagua won their 6th and 7th title in this new format. The tournament lasted from August 1997 to October 1998 and it consisted of 11 teams for the first time since the 1981–82 season. The final match was played in the evening of 25 October, just a few hours before Hurricane Mitch landed in the coasts of Honduras.

== 1997–98 teams ==
- Independiente Villela (invited)
- Marathón
- Motagua
- Olimpia
- Palestino (promoted)
- Platense
- Real España
- Real Maya
- Universidad
- Victoria
- Vida

== Apertura ==
=== Regular season ===
- Also serves as 1997 Honduran Cup.

==== Standings ====
Pos	Team	Pld	W	D	L	GF	GA	GD	Pts	Qualification or relegation
1	Platense (Note: Platense 1997 Honduran Cup champions as regular season winner.)	20	12	2	6	42	26	+16	38	Qualified to the Final round
2	Motagua	20	10	7	3	23	17	+6	37	Qualified to the Final round
3	Olimpia	20	9	9	2	33	21	+12	36	Qualified to the Final round
4	Marathón	20	8	8	4	30	24	+6	32	Qualified to the Final round
5	Real España	20	8	8	4	30	26	+4	32	Qualified to the Final round
6	Universidad	20	8	6	6	29	26	+3	30	Qualified to the Final round
7	Victoria	20	5	9	6	25	28	−3	24	
8	Vida	20	7	2	11	31	33	−2	23	
9	Real Maya	20	4	6	10	25	29	−4	18	
10	Palestino	20	3	5	12	28	43	−15	14	
11	Independiente Villela	20	1	8	11	19	42	−23	11	

==== Results ====
Home \ Away	IND	MAR	MOT	OLI	PAL	PLA	RES	MAY	UNI	VIC	VID
Independiente Villela		0–2	1–1	1–2	1–1	1–3	1–1	0–0	1–0	1–1	0–0
Marathón	1–0		0–1	0–0	3–1	0–2	2–2	1–1	0–0	1–1	2–3
Motagua	2–1	0–1		0–3	1–1	1–0	1–1	2–1	1–1	0–0	1–0
Olimpia	2–2	3–2	0–1		3–1	3–3	0–0	2–1	4–0	1–1	3–1
Palestino	1–1	1–3	3–4	1–2		1–3	2–3	1–0	3–2	1–1	2–1
Platense	4–2	1–1	1–0	3–0	4–2		4–1	1–0	1–2	4–1	0–2
Real España	3–1	2–3	0–2	0–0	2–0	1–0		2–0	1–0	2–1	1–0
Real Maya	4–1	2–3	0–0	1–1	2–2	2–3	2–2		1–2	3–0	1–2
Universidad	4–1	1–1	1–1	0–1	2–1	2–1	3–3	1–2		0–0	3–0
Victoria	3–1	1–1	2–3	1–1	2–1	3–2	2–2	2–0	1–2		2–1
Vida	7–2	2–3	0–1	2–2	3–2	1–2	2–1	1–2	2–3	1–0	

Source: RSSSF.com
Legend: Blue = home team win; Yellow = draw; Red = away team win.

=== Final round ===
==== Hexagonal ====
1 March 1998 1st leg	Marathón	2–3	Olimpia	San Pedro Sula, Cortés
	Castro; Rosales		Costa; Dolmo Flores; Williams	Stadium: Estadio Olímpico Metropolitano

15 March 1998 2nd leg	Olimpia	1–0	Marathón	Tegucigalpa, Francisco Morazán
	Velásquez			Stadium: Estadio Tiburcio Carías Andino

- Olimpia won 4–2 on aggregate.

7 March 1998 1st leg	Real España	0–0	Motagua	San Pedro Sula, Cortés
				Stadium: Estadio Olímpico Metropolitano

18 March 1998 2nd leg	Motagua	1–1	Real España	Tegucigalpa, Francisco Morazán
19:30 (UTC−06:00)	Martínez 85'		Cabrera 80'	Stadium: Estadio Tiburcio Carías Andino

- Motagua 1–1 Real España on aggregate. Motagua advanced on better Regular season record; Real España advanced as best loser.

12 March 1998 1st leg	Universidad	0–0	Platense	Tegucigalpa, Francisco Morazán
				Stadium: Estadio Tiburcio Carías Andino

15 March 1998 2nd leg	Platense	1–1	Universidad	Puerto Cortés, Cortés
	Contreras		Martínez	Stadium: Estadio Excélsior

- Platense 1–1 Universidad on aggregate; Platense advanced on better Regular season record.

==== Semifinals ====
28 March 1998 1st leg	Real España	2–0	Platense	San Pedro Sula, Cortés
	Morales; García			Stadium: Estadio Olímpico Metropolitano

5 April 1998 2nd leg	Platense	1–1	Real España	Puerto Cortés, Cortés
	Goal		Goal	Stadium: Estadio Excélsior

- Real España won 3–1 on aggregate.

29 March 1998 1st leg	Olimpia	1–2	Motagua	Tegucigalpa, Francisco Morazán
16:00 (UTC−06:00)	Costa		Guevara; Hernández	Stadium: Estadio Tiburcio Carías Andino

4 April 1998 2nd leg	Motagua	2–1	Olimpia	Tegucigalpa, Francisco Morazán
	Goal		Chacón	Stadium: Estadio Tiburcio Carías Andino

- Motagua 4–2 Olimpia on aggregate; Motagua advanced on better Regular season record.

==== Final ====
15 April 1998 1st leg	Real España	0–3	Motagua	San Pedro Sula, Cortés
19:30 (UTC−06:00)			Ramírez 21'; Lagos 55'; Guevara 89'	Stadium: Estadio Olímpico Metropolitano

18 April 1998 2nd leg	Motagua	2–1	Real España	Tegucigalpa, Francisco Morazán
19:30 (UTC−06:00)	Ramírez 20'; Guevara 32'		Morales 26'	Stadium: Estadio Tiburcio Carías Andino

- Motagua won 5–1 on aggregate.

=== Top goalscorers ===
19 goals

- (Honduras) Wilmer Velásquez (Olimpia)

11 goals

- (Honduras) Juan Manuel Cárcamo (Platense)

7 goals

- (Brazil) Denilson Costa (Olimpia)
- (Honduras) Francisco Ramírez (Motagua)
- (Honduras) Marlon Hernández (Motagua)

6 goals

- (Honduras) Amado Guevara (Motagua)
- (Honduras) Alex Pineda Chacón (Olimpia)

5 goals

- (Honduras) Alexis Duarte (Marathón)
- (Honduras) Jairo Martínez (Motagua)
- (Honduras) Edwin Castro (Marathón)

== Clausura ==
=== Regular season ===
==== Standings ====
Pos	Team	Pld	W	D	L	GF	GA	GD	Pts	Qualification or relegation
1	Olimpia	20	13	7	0	46	15	+31	46	Qualified to the Final round
2	Motagua	20	14	4	2	39	15	+24	46	Qualified to the Final round
3	Platense	20	8	8	4	36	30	+6	32	Qualified to the Final round
4	Marathón	20	7	9	4	29	28	+1	30	Qualified to the Final round
5	Real Maya	20	8	4	8	26	27	−1	28	Qualified to the Final round
6	Victoria	20	6	8	6	24	25	−1	26	Qualified to the Final round
7	Vida	20	5	8	7	26	26	0	23	
8	Real España	20	5	8	7	24	26	−2	23	
9	Palestino	20	4	6	10	20	38	−18	18	
10	Independiente Villela	20	2	6	12	23	45	−22	12	
11	Universidad	20	1	6	13	14	33	−19	9	

==== Results ====
Home \ Away	IND	MAR	MOT	OLI	PAL	PLA	RES	MAY	UNI	VIC	VID
Independiente Villela		1–1	3–3	1–4	0–1	2–2	2–2	1–3	2–0	1–3	0–0
Marathón	1–0		0–0	0–3	5–0	2–2	3–3	3–2	1–1	1–0	2–0
Motagua	6–1	1–0		1–1	4–1	3–0	2–0	2–0	2–1	1–0	2–0
Olimpia	2–0	5–0	2–1		4–0	1–1	3–1	3–0	2–0	1–1	4–3
Palestino	0–1	4–2	0–1	1–1		1–1	0–3	2–3	2–0	1–1	3–2
Platense	5–3	1–2	3–2	1–2	1–1		2–1	4–1	3–1	2–2	1–0
Real España	2–0	1–1	2–4	0–1	1–1	1–1		2–1	1–2	0–1	0–0
Real Maya	2–1	2–2	0–1	2–2	3–0	0–0	0–1		2–1	1–0	0–0
Universidad	0–0	1–1	0–1	1–1	1–1	2–3	0–1	0–1		1–3	0–2
Victoria	3–2	0–2	0–0	1–4	3–1	1–0	1–1	0–2	1–1		1–1
Vida	5–2	1–1	1–2	0–0	1–0	2–3	1–1	2–1	3–1	2–2	

Source: RSSSF.com
Legend: Blue = home team win; Yellow = draw; Red = away team win.

=== Final round ===
==== Hexagonal ====
19 September 1998 1st leg	Victoria	1–2	Olimpia	La Ceiba, Atlántida
	Bengoché		Costa; Martins	Stadium: Estadio Nilmo Edwards

27 September 1998 2nd leg	Olimpia	0–1	Victoria	Tegucigalpa, Francisco Morazán
14:00 (UTC−06:00)			Venier	Stadium: Estadio Tiburcio Carías Andino

- Olimpia 2–2 Victoria on aggregate; Olimpia advances on better performance in Regular season; Victoria advances as best loser.

19 September 1998 1st leg	Marathón	0–0	Platense	San Pedro Sula, Cortés
				Stadium: Estadio Olímpico Metropolitano

27 September 1998 2nd leg	Platense	1–1	Marathón	Puerto Cortés, Cortés
				Stadium: Estadio Excélsior

- Platense 1–1 Marathón on aggregate; Platense advances on better performance in Regular season.

20 September 1998 1st leg	Real Maya	1–4	Motagua	Siguatepeque, Comayagua
				Stadium: Estadio Roberto Martínez Avila

27 September 1998 2nd leg	Motagua	1–1	Real Maya	Tegucigalpa, Francisco Morazán
16:00 (UTC−06:00)				Stadium: Estadio Tiburcio Carías Andino

- Motagua won 5–2 on aggregate.

==== Semifinals ====
3 October 1998 1st leg	Victoria	2–1	Olimpia	La Ceiba, Atlántida
19:30 (UTC−06:00)	Obando; Venier		Martins	Stadium: Estadio Nilmo Edwards

11 October 1998 2nd leg	Olimpia	1–0	Victoria	Tegucigalpa, Francisco Morazán
16:00 (UTC−06:00)	Martins			Stadium: Estadio Tiburcio Carías Andino

- Olimpia 2–2 Victoria on aggregate; Olimpia advances on better performance in Regular season.

4 October 1998 1st leg	Platense	3–3	Motagua	Puerto Cortés, Cortés
15:00 (UTC−06:00)	Centeno; Cruz; Fuentes		Guevara	Stadium: Estadio Excélsior

11 October 1998 2nd leg	Motagua	2–1	Platense	Tegucigalpa, Francisco Morazán
14:00 (UTC−06:00)	Hernández; Ramírez		de León	Stadium: Estadio Tiburcio Carías Andino

- Motagua won 5–4 on aggregate.

==== Final ====
18 October 1998 1st leg	Motagua	0–0	Olimpia	Tegucigalpa, Francisco Morazán
16:00 (UTC−06:00)				Stadium: Estadio Tiburcio Carías Andino

25 October 1998 2nd leg	Olimpia	0–1 (a.e.t.)	Motagua	Tegucigalpa, Francisco Morazán
16:00 (UTC−06:00)			Clavasquín 117'	Stadium: Estadio Tiburcio Carías Andino; Attendance: 34,194; Referee: Óscar Bardales

Olimpia	Motagua

GK	–	(Argentina) Silvio Traverso	(red card) 96'
DF	–	(Honduras) José Fernández
DF	–	(Honduras) Gregorio Serrano
DF	–	(Honduras) Rudy Williams
DF	–	(Honduras) Merlyn Membreño
DF	–	(Honduras) Samuel Caballero
MF	–	(Honduras) José Romero	Substituted off
MF	–	(Honduras) Christian Santamaría	Substituted off
MF	–	(Honduras) Alex Pineda
FW	–	(Brazil) Denilson Costa
FW	–	(Brazil) Rodinei Martins	Substituted off
Substitutions:
MF	–	(Honduras) José Pineda	Substituted on
FW	–	(Honduras) Eduardo Arriola	Substituted on
GK	–	(Panama) Donaldo González	Substituted on
Manager:
(Honduras) José Herrera

GK	1	(Argentina) Diego Vásquez
DF	4	(Honduras) Hernaín Arzú
DF	5	(Honduras) Milton Reyes
DF	6	(Honduras) Ninrrol Medina
DF	12	(Honduras) Iván Guerrero
DF	13	(Honduras) Reynaldo Clavasquín
MF	8	(Honduras) Juan Coello
MF	20	(Honduras) Amado Guevara
MF	–	(Honduras) Óscar Lagos
FW	11	(Honduras) José Ramírez
FW	14	(Honduras) Marlon Hernández	Substituted off
Substitutions:
MF	–	(Honduras) Luis Guifarro
Manager:
(Honduras) Ramón Maradiaga

- Motagua won 1–0 on aggregate.

=== Top goalscorers ===
15 goals

- (Honduras) Wilmer Velásquez (Olimpia)
- (Honduras) Amado Guevara (Motagua)

13 goals

- (Brazil) Denilson Costa (Olimpia)

8 goals

- (Honduras) Juan Manuel Cárcamo (Platense)

7 goals

- (Honduras) Marlon Hernández (Olimpia)
- (Honduras) Francisco Ramírez (Marathón)
- (Brazil) Rodinei Martins (Olimpia)
- (Brazil) Toninho (Marathón)

5 goals

- (Honduras) Alejandro Naíf (Victoria)
- (Honduras) Marvin Brown (Vida)
- (Honduras) Luis Ramírez (Independiente Villela)

2 goals

- (Honduras) Carlos Salinas (Motagua)
- (Honduras) Fabricio Pérez (Marathón)

1 goal

- (Honduras) Alexander Díaz (Real España)
- (Honduras) Enrique Reneau (Marathón)

== Relegation table ==
Pos	Team	Pld	W	D	L	GF	GA	GD	Pts	Qualification or relegation
1	Motagua	40	24	11	5	62	32	+30	83	Qualified to the 1998 Torneo Grandes de Centroamerica
2	Olimpia	40	22	16	2	79	36	+43	82	Qualified to the 1998 Torneo Grandes de Centroamerica
3	Platense	40	20	10	10	78	56	+22	70	
4	Marathón	40	15	17	8	60	52	+8	62	
5	Real España	40	13	16	11	54	52	+2	55	Qualified to the 1998 Torneo Grandes de Centroamerica
6	Victoria	40	11	17	12	49	53	−4	50	
7	Vida	40	12	10	18	57	59	−2	46	
8	Real Maya	40	12	10	18	51	56	−5	46	
9	Universidad	40	9	12	19	43	59	−16	39	
10	Palestino	40	7	11	22	48	81	−33	32	Relegated to the Liga de Ascenso (Note: Palestino and Independiente Villela relegated to the Liga de Ascenso.)
11	Independiente Villela	40	3	14	23	42	87	−45	23	Relegated to the Liga de Ascenso

== Squads ==
Independiente Villela
(Honduras) Wilmer Enrique "Supermán" Cruz	(Honduras) Marel Álvarez	(Honduras) Jorge Flores
(Honduras) José Luis “Pili” Aguirre	(Honduras) Martín Castro	(Honduras) Wilmer Roque
(Honduras) David Zambrano	(Honduras) Gustavo Gallegos	(Honduras) Mauricio Edgardo Figueroa
(Honduras) Danilo Velásquez	(Honduras) Arnold López	(Honduras) Reynaldo "Chino" Pineda
(Honduras) Henry Guevara	(Honduras) Iván Ponce	(Honduras) José "Picardía" Padilla
(Honduras) Luis Santamaría	(Honduras) Pablo Valencia	(Honduras) Gustavo Venegas
(Honduras) Sergio Bustos	(Honduras) Hernán Carusso	(Honduras) Hugo Aguilar
(Honduras) Irineo Núñez	(Honduras) Óscar "Pando" Gómez	(Honduras) Edgardo Emilson Soto Fajardo
(Honduras) Leonardo Isaula	(Honduras) Gustavo Olaíndia	(Honduras) Mario Obulgen
(Honduras) Iván Nolasco	(Honduras) Mariano "Tierno" Ramírez	(Honduras) Francisco Sandoval
(Honduras) Walter Amador	(Honduras) Édgar Fajardo	(Honduras) Édgar Delgado
(Honduras) José Zaldívar	(Honduras) Luis "Bombero" Ramírez	(Honduras) Noé Argueta
Palestino
(Honduras) Dangelo Bautista	(Honduras) Wilmer Centeno	(Honduras) Javier Padilla
(Honduras) Ricardo Pérez	(Honduras) Wilson Castellanos	(Honduras) Cristino Bernárdez
(Honduras) Marvin Mazariegos	(Honduras) Selvin Sánchez	(Honduras) Walter “Gualala” Trejo
(Honduras) Raúl Trejo	(Honduras) Luis Perdomo	(Honduras) Marcos Pitío
(Honduras) Carlos Mathis	(Honduras) Enrique Carías	(Honduras) Carlos Gotay
(Argentina) Carlos González	(Saint Vincent and the Grenadines) James Chewitt	(Chile) Yerco Salinas
(Honduras) Gustavo Cálix	(Honduras) Marvin Morán	(Honduras) Rubén Cantarero
(Colombia) Óscar Hurtarte	(Honduras) Carlos Ellis	(Honduras) Juan Carlos Salinas
(Colombia) Juan Carlos Canchimbo	(Honduras) Juan Ramón Hernández	(Honduras) Mario Guerrero
(Honduras) Israel Bernárdez	(Honduras) Marvin "Mango" Henríquez	(Honduras) Edward Barahona
(Honduras) Danilo "Pollo" Galindo	(Honduras) Osmar Vargas	(Honduras) Iván Elías
(Honduras) Martín Álvarez	(Argentina) Claudio Chasior	(Argentina) Gustavo Steimbach
(Honduras) Evelio Barralaga	(Honduras) Felipe Valerio	(Costa Rica) Nicole Watson
(Honduras) Jorge García	(Honduras) Henry Enamorado	(Honduras) David Flores
(Honduras) Hudell Thompson	(Honduras) Neptally Romero	(Honduras) Aldo Fuentes
(Honduras) Allan Villegas
Marathon
(Costa Rica) Pedro Cubillo	(Honduras) Mario Beata	(Honduras) Jaime Rosales
(Honduras) Erasmo "Urco" Castillo	(Honduras) Ciro Paulino "pali" Castillo	(Honduras) Alex Roberto "robot" Bailey
(Honduras) Fabricio "amapala" Pérez	(Honduras) Alexis Duarte	(Honduras) Geovanny "venado" Castro
(Honduras) Antonio Rudon Arita	(Honduras) Nigel Zuniga	(Honduras) Nahaman Gonzales
(Honduras) Juan Castro	(Honduras) Edwin Medina	(Brazil) Toninho dos Santos
(Brazil) Antono de Brito	(Honduras) Basilio Zapata	(Honduras) Juan Castro
(Honduras) Enrique Centeno Renau	(Honduras) Luis "chino" Reyes	(Honduras) Victor Coello
(Honduras) Behiker Bustillo
Motagua
(Argentina) Diego Martin Vásquez	(Honduras) Ninrod Madina	(Honduras) Hernain Arzu
(Honduras) Reinaldo Clavasquin	(Honduras) Arón Hernandez	(Honduras) Juan Manuel "Gato" Coello
(Honduras) Milton "Jocon" Reyes	(Honduras) Amado "Lobo" Guevara	(Honduras) Juan Carlos Raudales
(Colombia) Roberto Asprilla	(Honduras) Marlon "Pitufo" Hernández	(Honduras) Luis "Chamaquito" Guifarro
(Honduras) Presley Carson Woods	(Honduras) Jairo Manfredo Martinez	(Honduras) Francisco "Pancho Ra" Ramirez
(Argentina) Ariel Leyes	(Honduras) Oscar "Mexicano" Lagos	(Honduras) Ivan Guerrero
Olimpia
(Panama) Donaldo González	(Honduras) Nerlin Membreño	(Honduras) Favio Ulloa
(Honduras) Samuel Caballero	(Honduras) Alberto Güity	(Honduras) Gregorio Serrano
(Honduras) Jose Luis "Flaco" Pineda	(Honduras) Nahun Espinoza	(Honduras) Dolmo Flores
(Argentina) Silvio Traverso	(Brazil) Denilson Costa de Oliveira	(Honduras) Wilmer Velasquez
(Honduras) Eduardo Arriola Carter	(Honduras) Cesar Henriquez	(Honduras) Nolberto Martinez
(Honduras) Ramon Romero "Romerito"
Platense
(Panama) Ricardo James	(Honduras) Rony Morales	(Panama) Anthony "El Caballo de Hierro" Torres
(Honduras) Limber Perez	(Honduras) Marco Antonio Mejía	(Honduras) Jorge Arita Neals
(Honduras) Robel Bernardez	(Honduras) Roberto bernardez	(Honduras) Abel Rodriguez
(Honduras) Julio Cesar "Rambo" D. Leon	(Honduras) José Luis "Runga" Piota	(Brazil) Carlos Da Silva
(Honduras) Juan Manuel Carcamo	(Argentina) Gustavo Fuentes	(Honduras) Hernan Centeno Batiz
Real Maya
(Honduras) Marvin Fonseca	(Honduras) Luis Lagos	(Honduras) Hector Amaya
(Argentina) Leonardo Svagher	(Honduras) Lenin Suárez	(Honduras) Edgar Sierra
(Honduras) David Carcamo	(Honduras) Jose "Flaco" Hernandez	(Honduras) Geovany "Yura" Rochez
(Argentina) Claudio Sanchez	(Honduras) Nelson Rosale	(Honduras) Guillermo Ramirez
(Honduras) Luis Enrique "Gavilan" Calix	(Honduras) Elvis "Chusa" Castellanos	(Honduras) Alberto Guity
Real España
(Honduras) Milton "Chocolate" Flores	(Honduras) Javier Rodríguez	(Honduras) Jaime Ruiz
(Honduras) Luis Lopez Zelaya	(Honduras) Marco Vinicio "Chacal" Ortega	(Honduras) Camilo "Tin Tin" Bonilla Paz
(Argentina) Diego Fernandez	(Argentina) Miguel Fernandez	(Honduras) Edgar Figueroa
(Honduras) César Clother	(Honduras) Marlon Monge	(Honduras) Mario Rodríguez
(Honduras) Norman Martínez	(Honduras) Ricky Denis García	(Honduras) Francis Reyes
(Honduras) Orvin Cabrera	(Honduras) Jorge Zapata	(Honduras) Alexander Díaz
(Honduras) Miguel Angel "Gallo" Mariano	(Honduras) Rodolfo Richardson Smith	(Uruguay) S. Alderete
Universidad
(Argentina) Damian Garofalo	(Argentina) Guillermo César Sumich	(Honduras) Troy Andrerson
(Honduras) Miguel Arcangel Guity	(Argentina) Daniel Aquino	(Honduras) Amidanan Lainez
(Honduras) Juan Rosa Lagos	(Argentina) Martin Sirimarco	(Honduras) Hector Leonel Rodriguez
(Argentina) Claudio del Barco	(Honduras) D. Bonilla	(Honduras) Camilo Bonilla Ocampo
(Honduras) Rony Zelaya	(Honduras) Jorge "Avioneta" Martinez	(Honduras) Raul Dolmo
Victoria
(Argentina) Carlos Pronno	(Honduras) Javier Martinez	(Honduras) Raul Martinez Sambula
(Honduras) Renán Cristino Bengoché	(Honduras) Fabricio Pérez	(Honduras) Francisco Antonio Pavón
(Honduras) Hernan Funez	(Honduras) Jose Garcia	(Honduras) Erick Dario Fú
(Honduras) cesar "Nene" Obando	(Honduras) Byron Suazo	(Argentina) Alejandro "Turco" Naif
(Panama) Persibal Piggot	(Honduras) Mauricio Edgardo Figueroa	(Uruguay) Alvaro Izquierdo

== Curiosities ==
On 12 July 1998, the league scheduled a match between Palestino F.C. and Universidad at Estadio Miraflores. The game which started at 14:00 local time, was played at the same time of the 1998 FIFA World Cup Final between France and Brazil. The match which ended 2–0 to Palestino, was witnessed by 55 loyal fans, an outstanding record.
