= 1999 Honduran Supercup =

Motagua	Platense
1	0
- Date: 13 January 1999
- Venue: Estadio Tiburcio Carías Andino, Tegucigalpa
- Man of the Match: Amado Guevara

The 1999 Honduran Supercup was held between winners of 1997–98 Honduran Liga Nacional (Motagua) and 1997 Honduran Cup (Platense). It was the second attempt for the Selacios to obtain the crown, however, the Blues prevailed as champions.

== Qualified teams ==
Team	Method of qualification	Appearances
Motagua	Winners of 1997–98 Honduran Liga Nacional	1st
Platense	Winners of 1997 Honduran Cup	2nd

== The game ==
13 January 1999

Motagua	1–0	Platense
Coello

Estadio Tiburcio Carías Andino
Tegucigalpa

Motagua	Platense
