= Prono =

Prono is a surname. Notable people with the name include:

- Andrea Prono (born 1984), Paraguayan swimmer
- Carlos Prono (born 1963), Argentine footballer
- Enzo Prono (born 1991), Paraguayan footballer
- Genaro Prono (born 1989), Paraguayan swimmer
- Hugo Prono (1923–1970), Argentine water polo player who competed in the 1948 Summer Olympics
- Marcos Prono (born 1975), Paraguayan swimmer
- Nelly Prono (1926–1997), Paraguayan actress in Argentine theatre, radio, television and film
- Verónica Prono (born 1978), Paraguayan swimmer
