= Carlos Prono =

Argentine footballer

Personal information
- Full name: Carlos Enrique Prono
- Date of birth: 5 October 1963 (age 63)
- Place of birth: Buenos Aires, Argentina
- Height: 1.86 m (6 ft 1 in)
- Position: Goalkeeper

Youth career
- 1977–1978: Deportivo Merlo
- 1979–1981: Independiente

Senior career*
Years	Team	Apps	(Gls)
1978	Deportivo Merlo		
1981–1984	Independiente		
1985–1986	Chacarita Juniors	5	(0)
1986–1987	Cristal Caldas		
1988–1993	Deportes Quindío		
1990	→ Talleres (loan)	15	(0)
1991–1992	→ Unión Española (loan)	31	(0)
1992	→ Talleres (loan)	9	(0)
1995–1997	CD Olimpia	40	(0)
1997–1998	Victoria	18	(0)
1998–2001	CD Olimpia	68	(0)

International career
1983	Argentina U20		
- * Club domestic league appearances and goals

Carlos Enrique Prono (born October 5, 1963, in Buenos Aires, Argentina) is an Argentine former professional footballer who played as a goalkeeper in clubs of Argentina, Chile, Colombia and Honduras.

== Career ==
- (Argentina) Deportivo Merlo 1978
- (Argentina) Independiente 1981–1984
- (Argentina) Chacarita Juniors 1985–1986
- (Colombia) Cristal Caldas 1986–1987
- (Colombia) Deportes Quindío 1988–1990
- (Argentina) Talleres 1990
- (Chile) Unión Española 1991–1992
- (Argentina) Talleres 1992
- (Honduras) Olimpia 1995–1997
- (Honduras) Victoria 1997–1998
- (Honduras) Olimpia 1998–2001

== Post-retirement ==
Prono has developed a career as football commentator in Honduras.

Prono started a football academy in Honduras alongside Nahúm Espinoza.

== Honours ==
- Unión Española 1992 and 1993 (Copa Chile)
- Olimpia 1996-97 Liga Nacional de Fútbol de Honduras
- Olimpia 1998-99 Liga Nacional de Fútbol de Honduras
- Olimpia 2000-01 Torneo Apertura
