= Denilson Costa =

Honduran footballer and coach (born 1968)

Personal information
- Full name: Denilson Costa
- Date of birth: 10 June 1968 (age 58)
- Place of birth: São João de Meriti, Brazil
- Height: 1.79 m (5 ft 10 in)
- Position: Forward

Team information
- Current team: Necaxa (Coach)

Senior career*
Years	Team	Apps	(Gls)
1990–1991	Limonense	12	(9)
1991–1995	Olimpia	67	(32)
1995	Belén		
1995–1997	Motagua	50	(20)
1997–2002	Olimpia	195	(67)
2003–2005	Marathón	91	(24)
2005–2006	Platense	32	(11)
2006	Heredia	18	(5)
2007	Atlético Olanchano	30	(1)
2007	Necaxa	16	

International career^{‡}
2003–2005	Honduras	5	(0)

Managerial career
- 2011: Necaxa
- * Club domestic league appearances and goals as of 2007 ‡ National team caps and goals as of 2006

Denilson Costa (born 10 June 1968) is a Brazilian and naturalized Honduran football coach and former player.

He is currently the second all-time top scorer in the Honduran Liga Nacional and was also the first to reach 150 goals. Now he is a teacher in Honduras. Costa along with Marcelo Ferreira and Justin Arboleda are among the only naturalized Honduran nationals to have played for the Honduras national football team.

== Club career ==
Born in Brazil, Denilson moved to Honduras in 1991 and made his league debut in September 1991 for Olimpia against Súper Estrella, scoring the only goal of the game. He spent his entire career in Honduras, except for short spells in Costa Rica with Limonense for whom he scored the fastest goal in Costa Rica's premier division history in December 1990 and Belén and in Guatemala with Heredia. He finished his playing career at Necaxa to become the club's manager a few seasons later.

He played 481 matches is Honduran professional football, which is still a record.

Team	Season	Games	Goal
Club Deportivo Olimpia	1991-92	12	11
Club Deportivo Olimpia	1992-93	26	12
Club Deportivo Olimpia	1993-94	24	7
Club Deportivo Olimpia	1994-95	5	2
Total	1992–1995	67	32
F.C. Motagua	1995-96	23	6
F.C. Motagua	1996-97	27	14
Total	1995–1997	50	20
Club Deportivo Olimpia	1997-98 A	21	7
Club Deportivo Olimpia	1997-98 C	24	13
Club Deportivo Olimpia	1998-99	18	10
Club Deportivo Olimpia	1999-2000 A	20	2
Club Deportivo Olimpia	1999-2000 C	21	3
Club Deportivo Olimpia	2000-01 A	22	8
Club Deportivo Olimpia	2000-01 C	14	5
Club Deportivo Olimpia	2001-02 A	19	7
Club Deportivo Olimpia	2001-02 C	18	6
Club Deportivo Olimpia	2002-03 A	18	6
Total	1997–2002	195	67
Club Deportivo Marathón	2002-03 C	22	10
Club Deportivo Marathón	2003-04 A	19	9
Club Deportivo Marathón	2003-04 C	18	2
Club Deportivo Marathón	2004-05 A	18	2
Club Deportivo Marathón	2004-05 C	14	1
Total	2003–2005	91	24
Club Deportivo Platense	2005-06 A	14	3
Club Deportivo Platense	2005-06 C	18	8
Total'	2005–2006	32	11
Atlético Olanchano	2006-07 C	14	0
Atlético Olanchano	2007–08 A	16	1
Total	2007	30	1
Career Total	1991–1995, 1995–2006, 2007	465	155

== International career ==
Denilson made his debut for his adopted home country Honduras in an October 2003 friendly match against Bolivia and has earned a total of 5 caps, scoring no goals.

His final international was a March 2005 friendly against the USA.

== Managerial career ==
On 6 March 2011, Costa made his professional debut as coach with C.D. Necaxa in the 0–1 home defeat against F.C. Motagua.

== Personal life ==
Denilson married Costa Rican Mirta Yorleni Ortiz whom he met while playing in Limón. She is a niece of former Costa Rican international Enrique Rivers. He became a Honduran citizen in 2002.

== Honours ==
=== Player ===
C.D. Olimpia

- Liga Profesional de Honduras: 1992–93, 1998–99, 2000–01 A, 2002–03 A

C.D. Marathón

- Liga Profesional de Honduras: 2002–03 C, 2004–05 A
