= Presley Carson =

Honduran footballer (1968–2024)

Presley Carson Woods Roland
Personal information
- Full name: Presley Carson Woods Roland
- Date of birth: 20 July 1968
- Place of birth: Roatán, Bay Islands, Honduras
- Date of death: 28 February 2024 (aged 55)
- Place of death: Atlanta, Georgia, U.S.
- Position: Striker

Senior career*
Years	Team	Apps	(Gls)
–1992	Platense		
1992–1998	Motagua	95	(25)
1998–1999	Victoria		
1999–2000	Federal		
2001–2002	Real Comayagua		

International career
1995–1998	Honduras	5	(3)
- * Club domestic league appearances and goals

Presley Carson Wood (20 July 1968 – 28 February 2024) was a Honduran footballer who played as a striker.

== Club career ==
Born in Roatán, Carson played almost 100 matches for F.C. Motagua over six years before joining Victoria in 1998. A year later he moved to Federal.

== International career ==
Carson made his debut for Honduras in a March 1995 friendly match against Brazil in which game he immediately scored his first international goal. He earned a total of five caps, scoring three goals. He represented his country at the 1996 CONCACAF Gold Cup and was a non-playing squad member at the 1998 CONCACAF Gold Cup.

His final international was a January 1998 friendly match against Costa Rica, scoring a third international goal.

== Death ==
Carson died from a heart attack on 28 February 2024, at the age of 55.

== Career statistics ==
Scores and results list Honduras' goal tally first, score column indicates score after each Carson goal.

List of international goals scored by Presley Carson
No.	Date	Venue	Opponent	Score	Result	Competition
1	29 March 1995	Estádio Serra Dourada, Goiânia, Brazil	Brazil	1–0	1–1	Friendly
2	10 January 1996	Edison International Field, Anaheim, United States	Canada	1–2	1–3	1996 CONCACAF Gold Cup
3	21 January 1998	Estadio Chorotega, Nicoya, Costa Rica	Costa Rica	2–1	4–1	Friendly
