= Leonardo Morales (footballer, born 1975) =

Honduran footballer

Personal information
- Full name: Leonardo Adoly Morales López
- Date of birth: October 8, 1975 (age 51)
- Place of birth: Santa Rosa de Aguán, Honduras
- Position: Defender

Senior career*
Years	Team	Apps	(Gls)
1997–1999	Real España		
2000–2002	Vida		
2002–2004	Marathón		
2005–2006	Vida		
2006–2008	Hispano	42	(1)
2009–2010	Vida	24	(0)

International career^{‡}
1999–2001	Honduras	5	(0)
- * Club domestic league appearances and goals as of 2007 ‡ National team caps and goals as of 2001

Leonardo Adoly Morales López (born October 8, 1975) is a retired Honduran footballer.

== Club career ==
Morales had played for Real España, Marathón and Hispano, before finishing his career at Vida, in the Liga Nacional de Honduras.

== International career ==
Morales made his debut for Honduras in a November 1999 friendly match against Trinidad & Tobago and has earned a total of 5 caps, scoring no goals. He has represented his country in 1 FIFA World Cup qualification match and played at the 2001 Copa América.

His final international was a July 2001 Copa America match against Uruguay.
