= Iván Guerrero =

Honduran footballer (born 1977)

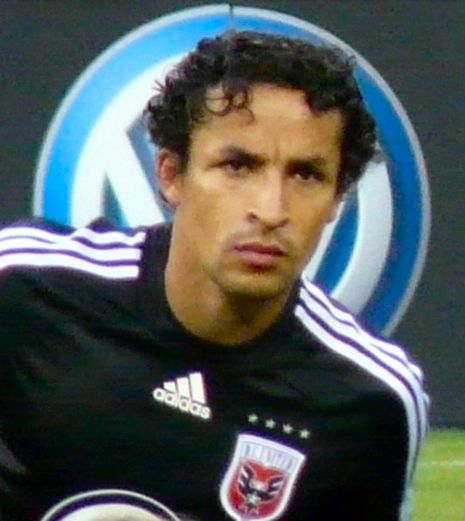

Personal information
- Full name: Mario Iván Guerrero Ramírez
- Date of birth: 30 November 1977 (age 48)
- Place of birth: Comayagua, Honduras
- Height: 1.73 m (5 ft 8 in)
- Position: Defender

Senior career*
Years	Team	Apps	(Gls)
1996–2000	Motagua	99	(3)
2000–2002	Coventry City	7	(0)
2002–2004	Motagua	38	(1)
2004	Peñarol	21	(1)
2005–2007	Chicago Fire	74	(3)
2008	San Jose Earthquakes	14	(1)
2008	D.C. United	13	(0)
2009	Colorado Rapids	0	(0)
2009–2011	Motagua	87	(1)
2013–2015	Fort Lauderdale Strikers	49	(0)

International career
2000	Honduras U23	3	(0)
1999–2010	Honduras	83	(4)

Managerial career
- 2015: Fort Lauderdale Strikers
Medal record
Honduras
Second place	UNCAF Nations Cup	2005
Third place	UNCAF Nations Cup	2009
- * Club domestic league appearances and goals

Mario Iván Guerrero Ramírez (born 30 November 1977) is a Honduran former footballer.

== Career ==
=== Club ===
Guerrero began his career with F.C. Motagua in Honduras, playing with the team from 1996 until transferring overseas in 2000. He moved to the English Premiership to play for Coventry City along with compatriot Jairo Martínez. He left the UK in October 2002 to rejoin Motagua and then moved to C.A. Peñarol in Uruguay in 2004, before his move to Chicago Fire of Major League Soccer.

=== Major League Soccer ===
He served as Chicago's lone representative in the 2005 MLS All-Star Game; and won the Fire's 2005 Fire/Honda MVP and Fire Defender of the Year awards.

On 21 November 2007 he was selected by San Jose Earthquakes in the 2007 MLS Expansion Draft. He was later traded to D.C. United on 31 July 2008 in exchange for a partial allocation. He made his D.C. United debut on 2 August 2008 as a starting left midfielder in a 2–0 win against Kansas City Wizards.

Guerrero was traded to Colorado Rapids in February 2009 as part of the deal taking Christian Gómez back to D.C. United. He was waived by Colorado on 17 June 2009.

=== Retirement ===
He retired in 2011 playing for F.C. Motagua.

=== Fort Lauderdale Strikers ===
On 24 January 2013, Guerrero ended retirement by signing with Fort Lauderdale Strikers of the North American Soccer League. In his first season with the Strikers he led the team in assists with six. Guerrero is captain of the club for the 2014 season. Following the dismissal of head coach Marcelo Neveleff on 7 June 2015, Guerrero was named interim head coach for the Strikers final spring season match against Minnesota United FC. On 30 April 2015, it was announced that Günter Kronsteiner would be returning as Strikers head coach. Guerrero will remain as an assistant coach on Kronsteiner's staff and also still be a part of the Strikers player roster.

== International career ==
Guerrero made his debut for Honduras in a March 1999 UNCAF Nations Cup match against Belize and has earned a total of 84 caps, scoring 4 goals. He has represented his country in 33 FIFA World Cup qualification matches and played at the 1999, 2001, 2005 and 2009 UNCAF Nations Cups as well as at the 2000, 2005 and 2007 CONCACAF Gold Cups.

He was a member of the national squad who competed at the 2000 Summer Olympics in Sydney.

His final international was an October 2010 friendly match against Guatemala.

=== International goals ===
Scores and results list Honduras' goal tally first.

N.	Date	Venue	Opponent	Score	Result	Competition
1.	4 March 2000	Estadio Francisco Morazán, San Pedro Sula, Honduras	Nicaragua	2–0	3–0	2002 FIFA World Cup qualification
2.	25 May 2001	Estadio Tiburcio Carías Andino, Tegucigalpa, Honduras	Nicaragua	1–1	10–2	2001 UNCAF Nations Cup
3.	18 August 2004	Estadio Alejandro Morera Soto, Alajuela, Costa Rica	Costa Rica	1–0	5–2	2006 FIFA World Cup qualification
4.	21 July 2005	Giants Stadium, East Rutherford, United States	United States	1–0	1–2	2005 CONCACAF Gold Cup

== Personal life ==
Guerrero is a permanent resident of the United States.

== Honours and awards ==
=== Club ===
F.C. Motagua

- Liga Nacional: 1997–98 A, 1997–98 C, 1999–2000 A, 1999–2000 C, 2010–11 C
- Honduran Super Cup: 1997–98

D.C. United

- Lamar Hunt U.S. Open Cup: 2008

Chicago Fire Soccer Club

- Lamar Hunt U.S. Open Cup: 2006

=== Country ===
Honduras

- CONCACAF Men's Olympic Qualifying Tournament: 2000
