= Amado Guevara =

Honduran footballer and manager (born 1976)

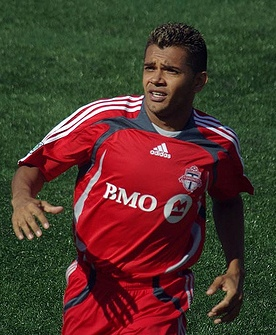
- Guevara playing for Toronto FC in 2008

Personal information
- Full name: Amado Guevara
- Date of birth: 2 May 1976 (age 50)
- Place of birth: Tegucigalpa, Honduras
- Height: 5 ft 11 in (1.80 m)
- Position: Attacking midfielder

Youth career
- 1992–1993: Olimpia
- 1993–1994: Motagua

Senior career*
Years	Team	Apps	(Gls)
1994–2000	Motagua	140	(47)
1995–1996	→ Real Valladolid (loan)	8	(0)
2000–2001	Toros Neza	26	(7)
2001–2002	Zacatepec	16	(2)
2002	Saprissa	19	(9)
2003–2006	MetroStars	103	(32)
2007–2008	Chivas USA	4	(0)
2007–2008	→ Motagua (loan)	21	(5)
2008–2009	Toronto FC	46	(9)
2010–2013	Motagua	113	(20)
2014–2015	Marathón	13	(1)
Total		509	(132)

International career
1995	Honduras U20		
1994–2010	Honduras	138	(27)

Managerial career
- 2018–2019: Puerto Rico
- 2018–2019: Puerto Rico U20
- 2024–: Carolina Core FC (assistant)
Medal record
Men's football
Representing Honduras
Copa América
Third place	2001 Colombia
Copa Centroamericana
Winner	1995 El Salvador
Third place	2009 Honduras
CONCACAF U-20 Tournament
Winner	1994 Honduras
- * Club domestic league appearances and goals

Amado Guevara (born 2 May 1976) is a Honduran former professional footballer and manager. He was the coach of Puerto Rico from 2018 to 2019.

A former midfielder, he is the second all-time cap leader for the Honduras national team seconded by Maynor Figueroa . He was selected as the Best Player of the 2001 Copa América, held in Colombia.

== Career ==
=== Club ===
Guevara, nicknamed El Lobo, began his career in Honduras with Club Deportivo Olimpia and F.C. Motagua, and subsequently played all over the world: in Spain with Real Valladolid, in Mexico with Toros Neza and CD Zacatepec, and in Costa Rica with Deportivo Saprissa.

He was signed by the MetroStars of Major League Soccer on 11 April 2003, and immediately stepped in and produced. He finished the season with three goals and ten assists (he added another goal in the playoffs). Guevara added four key goals and two assists in the U.S. Open Cup, leading the MetroStars to the first final of any sort in the team's history.

Guevara tallied ten goals (six on penalties) and ten assists in his second season. Guevara not only tied for the league lead in scoring, he was also named MLS's MVP. In 2005, he produced another solid season for the Metros, with 11 goals and 11 assists, and added a goal in the playoffs.

In early 2006, a conflict arose between Guevara and the MetroStars. The club allowed him to train with F.C. Motagua, but Guevara played for the Honduran club in a number of friendly matches, which might or might not have been permitted. Guevara lashed out in the Honduran press at the Metros' GM Alexi Lalas, but the two patched things up and Guevara remained in New York for the 2006 season. He received his green card in March 2006, thus no longer counting as a foreign player in MLS. During the last game of the re-branded New York Red Bulls season, Guevara scored a hat trick helping them win 3–2 and reach the playoffs.

Following the 2006 season, Guevara was traded to Chivas USA in exchange for a designated player slot. After playing just four games for the club, Chivas USA coach Preki told MLSnet.com that "I have a vision of where the club is going and [Guevara's] not part of it." This comment came following consistently poor performance on the field and an incident in which Guevara was sent off for pushing an assistant referee. Attempts to deal the midfielder to Toronto FC, Colorado Rapids, FC Dallas, and Columbus Crew were all shot down by Guevara. Guevara then accepted a loan move to his former club F.C. Motagua for the remainder of the 2007 season. He quickly recovered the form that made him a star in the US top flight, leading the Honduran club to the Central American Club Championship Copa Interclubes UNCAF 2007 defeating regional and Costa Rican giant Saprissa 2–1 on aggregate on 5 December 2007.

On 9 April 2008, Guevara was traded to Toronto FC for a 2009 and 2010 draft pick. He made his debut for Toronto FC in his new team's first win of the 2008 season, assisting Danny Dichio for the first goal of the game against the Los Angeles Galaxy. On 3 August 2008, Guevara was shown a straight red card by referee Baldomero Toledo after allegedly elbowing FC Dallas player Pablo Ricchetti in the face. The elbow drew blood, and Guevara was immediately thrown from the game. He received a 2-game suspension. While at TFC Guevara quickly became a fan favourite and was known for his darting runs, and spectacular free kicks. Guevara performed consistently well while in Toronto scoring a total of 9 goals over the course of the season, including 2 in the Canadian Championship. Guevara left Toronto to return to Honduran side F.C. Motagua in December 2009.

In the 2010–11 CONCACAF Champions League, Motagua was drawn against his former team, Toronto FC, in the preliminary round. Despite Guevara scoring two goals in the home leg, Motagua was eliminated 3–2 on aggregate.

In January 2013, el Lobo scored his 64th goal for Motagua, only 4 short of Óscar Hernández' 68 and 13 short of the club's all-time record goalscorer Ángel Obando.

In 2014, Guevara signed with Honduran side Marathón. He retired in 2015.

=== International ===
He made his debut for Honduras in a May 1994 Miami Cup match against Peru and has earned a total of 138 caps, scoring 27 goals. He has represented his country in 49 FIFA World Cup qualification matches and played at 5 UNCAF Nations Cups as well as at the 1998, 2000 and 2007 CONCACAF Gold Cups.

His final international was a June 2010 FIFA World Cup match against eventual winners Spain.

He was named the tournament MVP after leading Honduras to a surprise third-place finish in the 2001 Copa América. Honduras (a last minute call-up when Argentina dropped out a day before kickoff on 11 July 2001) arrived after the tournament started, just few hours before its first game with barely enough players. In the quarterfinal round, Honduras defeated Brazil (the favorite to win the tournament) by a score of 2–0. The defeat sent Brazil home and Honduras advanced to the semifinals.

Guevara helped lead Honduras through the qualification to the 2010 FIFA World Cup and captained the team at only their second appearance at a World Cup tournament.

=== Manager ===
On 9 August 2023 Carolina Core FC announced that he was the asset manager for Carolina Core FC for their first season in 2024.

== Career statistics ==
=== Club ===
Club performance			League		Cup		League Cup		Continental		Total	
Season	Club	League	Apps	Goals	Apps	Goals	Apps	Goals	Apps	Goals	Apps	Goals
USA			League		Open Cup		Playoffs		North America		Total	
2003	MetroStars	Major League Soccer	25	3	5	4	2	1	-	-	32	8
2004	MetroStars	Major League Soccer	24	10	0	0	2	0	-	-	26	10
2005	MetroStars	Major League Soccer	26	11	0	0	2	1	-	-	28	12
2006	New York Red Bulls	Major League Soccer	28	8	1	1	2	0	-	-	31	9
2007	Chivas USA	Major League Soccer	4	0								
2008	Toronto FC	Major League Soccer	21	4								
2009	Toronto FC	Major League Soccer	24	5								
Total	USA/Canada		143	41								
Career total			143	41								

=== International goals ===
Scores and results list Honduras' goal tally first.

N.	Date	Venue	Opponent	Score	Result	Competition
1.	16 April 1997	Estadio Mateo Flores, Guatemala City, Guatemala	Panama	5–0	5–0	1997 UNCAF Nations Cup
2.	19 March 1999	Estadio Nacional, San José, Costa Rica	Belize	3–1	5–1	1999 UNCAF Nations Cup
3.	16 December 1999	Estadio Olímpico Metropolitano, San Pedro Sula, Honduras	Zambia	5–1	7–1	Friendly match
4.	16 December 1999	Estadio Olímpico Metropolitano, San Pedro Sula, Honduras	Zambia	6–1	7–1	Friendly match
5.	16 August 2000	Estadio Tiburcio Carías Andino, Tegucigalpa, Honduras	Saint Vincent and the Grenadines	3–0	6–0	2002 FIFA World Cup qualification
6.	21 March 2001	Estadio Olímpico Metropolitano, San Pedro Sula, Honduras	Chile	2–1	3–1	Friendly match
7.	16 June 2001	Hasely Crawford Stadium, Port of Spain, Trinidad and Tobago	Trinidad and Tobago	4–1	4–2	2002 FIFA World Cup qualification
8.	1 July 2001	Estadio Tiburcio Carías Andino, Tegucigalpa, Honduras	Costa Rica	1–2	2–3	2002 FIFA World Cup qualification
9.	1 July 2001	Estadio Tiburcio Carías Andino, Tegucigalpa, Honduras	Costa Rica	2–2	2–3	2002 FIFA World Cup qualification
10.	16 July 2001	Atanasio Girardot, Medellín, Colombia	Bolivia	1–0	2–0	2001 Copa América
11.	16 July 2001	Atanasio Girardot, Medellín, Colombia	Bolivia	2–0	2–0	2001 Copa América
12.	19 July 2001	Atanasio Girardot, Medellín, Colombia	Uruguay	1–0	1–0	2001 Copa América
13.	23 February 2003	Estadio Rommel Fernández, Panama City, Panama	Guatemala	1–2	1–2	2003 UNCAF Nations Cup
14.	2 April 2003	Estadio Tiburcio Carías Andino, Tegucigalpa, Honduras	Paraguay	1–0	1–1	Friendly match
15.	19 June 2004	Estadio Olímpico Metropolitano, San Pedro Sula, Honduras	Netherlands Antilles	1–0	4–0	2006 FIFA World Cup qualification
16.	18 August 2004	Estadio Alejandro Morera Soto, Alajuela, Costa Rica	Costa Rica	3–2	5–2	2006 FIFA World Cup qualification
17.	4 September 2004	Commonwealth Stadium, Edmonton, Canada	Canada	1–1	1–1	2006 FIFA World Cup qualification
18.	8 September 2004	Estadio Olímpico Metropolitano, San Pedro Sula, Honduras	Guatemala	1–2	2–2	2006 FIFA World Cup qualification
19.	2 June 2007	Estadio Francisco Morazán, San Pedro Sula, Honduras	Trinidad and Tobago	2–1	3–1	Friendly match
20.	8 June 2007	Giants Stadium, East Rutherford, USA	Panama	1–1	2–3	2007 CONCACAF Gold Cup
21.	13 June 2007	Reliant Stadium, Houston, USA	Cuba	5–0	5–0	2007 CONCACAF Gold Cup
22.	6 February 2008	Estadio Olímpico Metropolitano, San Pedro Sula, Honduras	Paraguay	1–0	2–0	Friendly match
23.	7 June 2008	Estadio Nilmo Edwards, La Ceiba, Honduras	Haiti	3–0	3–1	Friendly match
24.	10 September 2008	Estadio Olímpico Metropolitano, San Pedro Sula, Honduras	Jamaica	2–0	2–0	2010 FIFA World Cup qualification
25.	18 January 2009	Lockhart Stadium, Fort Lauderdale, USA	Chile	2–0	2–0	Friendly match
26.	22 January 2009	Estadio Tiburcio Carías Andino, Tegucigalpa, Honduras	Belize	1–0	2–1	2009 UNCAF Nations Cup
27.	5 September 2009	Estadio Olímpico Metropolitano, San Pedro Sula, Honduras	Trinidad and Tobago	3–0	4–1	2010 FIFA World Cup qualification

== Managerial statistics ==
As of match played 16 November 2018

Managerial record by team and tenure
Team	From	To	Record					Ref
Team	From	To	P	W	D	L	Win %	Ref
Puerto Rico	27 July 2018	Present	4	0	0	4	0.0	
Puerto Rico U-20	27 July 2018	Present	5	3	0	2	60.0	
Carolina Core FC (Assistant Manager)	9 August 2023	Present	0	0	0	0	—	
Total			9	3	0	6	33.3	—

== Honours ==
Motagua

- Honduran Liga Nacional: 1997–98 A, 1997–98 C, 1999–00 A, 1999–00 C, 2010–11 C
- Honduran Super Cup: 1999
- UNCAF Interclub Cup: 2007

MetroStars

- MLS Atlantic Cup: 2003
- La Manga Cup: 2004

Chivas USA

- Western Conference Regular Season: 2007

Toronto FC

- Canadian Championship: 2009

Honduras

- Copa América third place: 2001
- Copa Centroamericana: 1995
- CONCACAF U-20 Tournament: 1994

Individual

- Honduran Liga Nacional Clausura Top Scorer: 1997–98
- Honduran Supercup Man of the Match: 1999
- Major League Soccer MVP: 2004
- MLS Golden Boot: 2004
- MLS Best XI: 2004
- MLS All-Star Game MVP: 2004
- Copa América Third Top Scorer: 2001
- Copa América Golden Ball: 2001

== See also ==
- List of men's footballers with 100 or more international caps

Preceded by Preki	Major League Soccer MVP Award; 2004	Succeeded by Taylor Twellman
