= Mario Chirinos =

Honduran footballer (born 1978)

Personal information
- Full name: Mario Roberto Chirinos Acosta
- Date of birth: 29 July 1978 (age 48)
- Place of birth: Tegucigalpa, Honduras
- Position: Midfielder

Senior career*
Years	Team	Apps	(Gls)
	Motagua	100	
2	Real España	37	(3)

International career
- Honduras
- * Club domestic league appearances and goals

Mario Roberto Chirinos Acosta (born 29 July 1978) is a Honduran former footballer who played as a midfielder. He competed in the men's tournament at the 2000 Summer Olympics.
