= Alejandro Naif =

Palestinian footballer

Personal information
- Full name: Raúl Alejandro Naif
- Date of birth: March 23, 1973 (age 53)
- Place of birth: Córdoba, Argentina
- Height: 1.83 m (6 ft 0 in)
- Position: Striker

Youth career
- Colón de Córdoba

Senior career*
| Years | Team | Apps | (Gls) |
| 1991–1992 | Colón Santa Fe | 1 | (0) |
| 1992–1993 | Juan Aurich | | |
| 1994–1995 | Deportivo Español | 10 | (4) |
| 1995–1996 | Nueva Chicago | | |
| 1996–1997 | Victoria | 47 | (25) |
| 1998 | Audax Italiano | 12 | (4) |
| 1999 | Santiago Wanderers | 16 | (4) |
| 1999–2000 | Victoria | | |
| 2000–2001 | Marathón | 32 | (6) |
| 2001 | Provincial Osorno | | |
| 2002 | Deportes Puerto Montt | 28 | (12) |
| 2003 | Provincial Osorno | | |
| 2004 | Santa Fe | 1 | (0) |
| 2005 | Provincial Osorno | | |
| 2006–2007 | Victoria | 15 | (5) |

International career
| 2002–2004 | Palestine | 8 | (0) |
- * Club domestic league appearances and goals

Raúl Alejandro Naif (Arabic: أليخاندرو نايف; born March 23, 1973) is a former footballer. Born in Argentina, he represented Palestine internationally.

== Club career ==
Naif played club football in Argentina, Peru, Honduras, Chile and Colombia as well as playing for the Palestine national football team.

He had three different spells with Honduran side C.D. Victoria for whom he netted 32 league goals in total.
