= Juan Raudales =

Honduran footballer (born 1979)

Juan Carlos Raudales
Personal information
- Full name: Juan Carlos Raudales Martínez
- Date of birth: 15 July 1979 (age 47)
- Place of birth: Tegucigalpa, Honduras
- Position: Defender

Team information
- Current team: Atlético Choloma
- Number: 30

Senior career*
Years	Team	Apps	(Gls)
1996–2002	Motagua	63	(0)
2002–2003	Olimpia	14	(1)
2003–2005	Valencia	10	(1)
2005–2007	Vida	48	(0)
2007–2009	Victoria	49	(0)
2009–2010	Vida	24	(0)
2010–2011	Hispano		
2011–2013	Atlético Choloma		

International career^{‡}
1999	Honduras U-20		
2001	Honduras	1	(0)
- * Club domestic league appearances and goals as of 2009-05-02 ‡ National team caps and goals as of 2009

Juan Carlos Raudales Martínez (born 15 July 1979) is a Honduran footballer who currently plays for Atlético Choloma.

== Club career ==
Raudales made his professional debut on 8 September 1996 for F.C. Motagua against Platense F.C. and, up to May 2009, played 184 matches for several Honduran national league teams.

In June 2009 he rejoined Vida and in 2011 he suffered the taste of relegation with Hispano. He then moved to Atlético Choloma.

== International career ==
Raudales played for Honduras at the 1999 FIFA World Youth Championship in Nigeria. He made his senior debut for Honduras in a July 2001 friendly match against Ecuador which proved to be his only international match.
