= Hernaín Arzú =

Honduran footballer (born 1967)

Personal information
- Full name: Hernaín Arzú Güity
- Date of birth: 13 October 1967 (age 59)
- Place of birth: Santa Rosa de Aguán, Honduras
- Position: Defender

Senior career*
Years	Team	Apps	(Gls)
1988–1998	Motagua	212	(1)
1999–2000	Marathón		

International career
1992–1998	Honduras	37	(0)

Managerial career
- 2003: Motagua
- 2003: Motagua (assistant)
- 2012: Alianza Becerra
- * Club domestic league appearances and goals

Hernaín Arzú Güity (born 13 October 1967) is a retired Honduran football player who made his name with the national team in the 1990s.

== Club career ==
Arzú started his career at F.C. Motagua and played 212 matches for the club over a period of 10 years. He also played for Marathón.

== International career ==
Arzú made his debut for Honduras in a June 1992 friendly match against Panama and has earned a total of 36 caps, scoring no goals. He has represented his country in 6 FIFA World Cup qualification matches and played at the 1995 and 1997 UNCAF Nations Cups as well as at the 1998 CONCACAF Gold Cup.

His final international was a February 1998 CONCACAF Gold Cup match against Mexico.

== Honours and awards ==
=== Club ===
F.C. Motagua

- Liga Profesional de Honduras (3): 1991–92, 1997–98 A, 1997–98 C

=== Country ===
Honduras

- Copa Centroamericana (1): 1995
