= Rodinei Martins =

Brazilian footballer

Personal information
- Full name: Rodinei Ricardo Martins
- Date of birth: 26 February 1969 (age 57)
- Place of birth: Brazil
- Position: Forward

Senior career*
Years	Team	Apps	(Gls)
1990–1991	Caçador		
1991–1992	San Luis FC		
1992–1993	Cruz Azul		
1994–1995	San Luis FC		
1995–1996	Atlético Marte		
1996–1997	Herediano		
1997–1998	Alajuelense		
1998–2000	Olimpia		
2000–2002	Águila		
2002–2004	Dragón		
- * Club domestic league appearances and goals

Rodinei Ricardo Martins (born 26 February 1969) is a Brazilian former professional football played as a forward.
