= Nerlin Membreño =

Honduran footballer (born 1972)

Personal information
- Full name: Nerlin Alexis Membreño Flores
- Date of birth: January 24, 1972 (age 54)
- Place of birth: Tegucigalpa, Honduras
- Height: 1.82 m (6 ft 0 in)
- Position: Left back

Team information
- Current team: Atlético Olanchano
- Number: 5

Senior career*
Years	Team	Apps	(Gls)
1992–2004	Olimpia		
2004–2006	Victoria		
2006–2007	Atlético Olanchano		

International career^{‡}
1991–2000	Honduras	17	(1)
- * Club domestic league appearances and goals as of 2007 ‡ National team caps and goals as of 2001

Nerlin Alexis Membreño Flores (born June 24, 1972) is a retired Honduran football defender.

== Club career ==
After a lengthy spell at Olimpia and a few seasons at Victoria, Membreño finished his career at Atlético Olanchano in Liga Nacional de Honduras.

== International career ==
Membreño made his debut for Honduras in a May 1991 UNCAF Nations Cup match against Panama and has earned a total of 17 caps, scoring 1 goal. He has represented his country in 5 FIFA World Cup qualification matches and played at the 1991 UNCAF Nations Cup as well as at the 1998 CONCACAF Gold Cup.

His final international was a March 2000 friendly match against Chile.

=== International goals ===
Scores and results list Honduras' goal tally first.

N.	Date	Venue	Opponent	Score	Result	Competition
1.	17 November 1996	Estadio Francisco Morazán, San Pedro Sula, Honduras	Saint Vincent and the Grenadines	8–2	11–3	1998 FIFA World Cup qualification

== Retirement ==
After quitting his playing career, he became assistant coach at Olimpia.
