= Clásico Sampedrano =

- Other names: Derbi Sampedrano
- Location: San Pedro Sula
- Teams: Marathón and Real España
- First meeting: 25 July 1965
- Latest meeting: 27 April 2022
- Next meeting: TBD
- Broadcasters: TVC and TDTV. Emisoras Unidas and América Multimedios

Statistics
- Total meetings: 240
- Most wins: Real España (88)
- All-time series (Liga Nacional only): 88–81–71 (Real España)
- Largest victory: Marathón 0-5 Real España(2 December 2001) Marathón 1–6 Real España (22 March 2014)

El Clásico Sampedrano (The Sampedran Derby) is a Honduran football match played at least 4 times a year in the Honduran Liga Nacional and consists of two teams, Marathón and Real España. These two teams are from San Pedro Sula, hence the name.

== Head to head ==
Pos	Team	Pld	W	D	L	GF	GA	GD	Pts
1	Real España	240	88	81	71	304	265	+39	257
2	Marathón	240	71	81	88	265	304	−39	223

Updated to match(es) played on 27 April 2022. Source:

== All time scorers ==
As of 31 October 2020

- Carlos Pavón for Real España with 10 goals.
- Gilberto Machado for Marathón with 8 goals

== Finals ==
Since the creations of Finals, there have been three Sampedran derbies, two won by Real España, and one by Marathón.

== Trivia ==
- This is the Honduran derby that has been played in the most cities.
- Real España dominates the derby by far, but the resurgence since 2000 by Marathón has brought a new mentality for their supporters.
