= Orvin Cabrera =

Honduran footballer (1977-2010)

Personal information
- Full name: Orvin Geovanny Cabrera Girón
- Date of birth: 20 February 1977
- Place of birth: La Lima, Honduras
- Date of death: 28 September 2010 (aged 33)
- Place of death: San Pedro Sula, Honduras
- Position: Striker

Senior career*
Years	Team	Apps	(Gls)
1995–1999	Real España	91	(33)
1999–2001	Olimpia	67	(12)
2002	Marathón	29	(3)
2003–2004	Luis Ángel Firpo		
2004–2009	Vida		
Total		187	(48)

International career
1995	Honduras U20	2	(0)
2000	Honduras	1	(1)
Medal record
Honduras
First place	CONCACAF U-20 Tournament	1994
- * Club domestic league appearances and goals

Orvin Geovanny Cabrera Girón (20 February 1977 – 28 September 2010) was a Honduran football player who played at both professional and international levels as a striker.

== Club career ==
Born in La Lima, Cabrera began his professional career in 1995, and played for Real España, Olimpia, Marathón, Salvadoran outfit Luis Ángel Firpo and Vida. He retired in 2009 due to illness.

== International career ==
Nicknamed Pato (Duck), Cabrera played at the 1995 FIFA World Youth Championship, making two appearances including a 7-1 demolition by Holland in which game he was sent off.

He also once appeared for the Honduran senior team, scoring one goal in a May 2000 friendly match against Canada.

== Death ==
Cabrera died in San Pedro Sula on 28 September 2010, following a two-year battle with kidney cancer. During his illness, his wife was robbed of money meant to cover his treatment costs.

He left behind his wife Narlin Morales and their two children, Nayelhy and Orvin.
