= Hugo Caballero (footballer, born 1974) =

Honduran footballer

Personal information
- Full name: Hugo Rolando Caballero Martínez
- Date of birth: 14 November 1974 (age 51)
- Place of birth: Tela, Honduras
- Position: Goalkeeper

Senior career*
Years	Team	Apps	(Gls)
1997–2002	Motagua		
2002–2003	Olimpia		
2003–2004	Marathón		
2004–2006	Motagua		
2006–2007	Atlético Olanchano		
2007–2008	Vida	2	(0)
2008–2009	Deportes Savio	2	(0)

International career^{‡}
1998–2001	Honduras	8	(0)
- * Club domestic league appearances and goals ‡ National team caps and goals as of 14:44, 22 May 2010 (UTC)

Hugo Rolando Caballero Martínez (born 14 November 1974) is a retired Honduran footballer.

== Club career ==
Caballero played as a goalkeeper and spent the majority of his career with F.C. Motagua, making his debut on 15 November 1997 against Victoria. He also played for Olimpia, Marathón, Atlético Olanchano and Vida who released him in May 2008. He then finished his career at Deportes Savio.

== International career ==
He made his debut for Honduras in a November 1998 friendly match against El Salvador and has earned a total of 8 caps, scoring no goals. He has represented his country at the 1999 and 2001 UNCAF Nations Cups as well as at the 2000 CONCACAF Gold Cup, but he only actually played at the 2001 tournament.

His final international was a May 2001 UNCAF Nations Cup match against El Salvador.

== Statistics ==
Team	Season	Games	Start	Sub	Goal	YC	RC
Deportes Savio	2008-09 A	0	0	0	0	0	0
