= Gustavo Fuentes =

Argentine footballer

Personal information
- Full name: Gustavo Andrés Fuentes
- Date of birth: 8 April 1973 (age 53)
- Place of birth: Buenos Aires, Argentina
- Height: 5 ft 11 in (1.80 m)
- Position: Striker

Youth career
- 1993–1994: Argentinos Juniors

Senior career*
Years	Team	Apps	(Gls)
1994–1995	River Plate (Uruguay)		
1995–1996	Cerro		
1996–1997	Deportivo Laferrere		
1997	Platense		
1998	Marathón		
1998–1999	Liverpool (Uruguay)		
1999–2000	Motagua		(18)
2000	Dundee United	3	(0)
2001–2002	Olimpia	30	(12)
2002	Bnei Yehuda		
2003	Talleres	2	(0)
2003	Alianza		
2004–2005	Public Bank		
2005–2006	Malacca FA		
2006–2007	Santiago Morning		
2007–2008	Johor FC		
2008	San Miguel		
- * Club domestic league appearances and goals

Gustavo Fuentes (born 8 April 1973 in Buenos Aires) is a former Argentine footballer who plays as a striker.

== Club career ==
Fuentes has played for some fifteen clubs during his career, which has taken him through several continents.

== See also ==
- Dundee United FC Season 2000-01
