= Óscar Lagos =

Honduran footballer (born 1973)

Personal information
- Full name: Óscar Abraham Lagos Núñez
- Date of birth: 17 June 1973 (age 53)
- Place of birth: Villa de San Francisco, Honduras
- Height: 1.76 m (5 ft 9 in)
- Position: Midfielder

Youth career
- 1986: Melgar

Senior career*
Years	Team	Apps	(Gls)
1991–1995	Motagua		
1995–1996	Real Maya		
1997–2001	Motagua		
2001–2003	Dragón		
2003	Real Patepluma		
2005–2006	Universidad		
2006–2007	Real Estelí		

International career
1995–2001	Honduras	18	(0)
- * Club domestic league appearances and goals

Óscar Abraham Lagos Núñez (born 17 June 1973) is a retired Honduran football player.

== Club career ==
Nicknamed el Mexicano because he lived there with his mother in his youth, Lagos played the majority of his career for F.C. Motagua for whom he scored 2 league goals, but also had spells with Real Maya, Real Patepluma and Universidad. He played abroad for Salvadoran outfit Dragón and in 2006 he moved to Nicaragua to play with Real Estelí.

== International career ==
Lagos made his debut for Honduras in a March 1995 friendly match against Brazil and has earned a total of 18 caps, scoring no goals. He has represented his country in 1 FIFA World Cup qualification match and played at the 1996 and 2000 CONCACAF Gold Cups as well as at the 2001 Copa América, where he tested positive for the use of cocaine and marihuana after failing a test after their opening game against Costa Rica. He was subsequently banned from playing for two years.

As a consequence, his final international was the July 2001 Copa América match against Bolivia.

== Personal life ==
Lagos is divorced and has four children. Former World Cup player Juan Cruz Murillo is an uncle, being the brother of his mother.

Lagos has struggled with drugs from the age of 11, visiting three rehab centers without success. As of September 2015, he was without a job and living in poverty.
