= Estadio Excélsior =

Multipurpose stadium in Honduras

Coordinates: 15.846856°N 87.937794°W

Estadio Excelsior
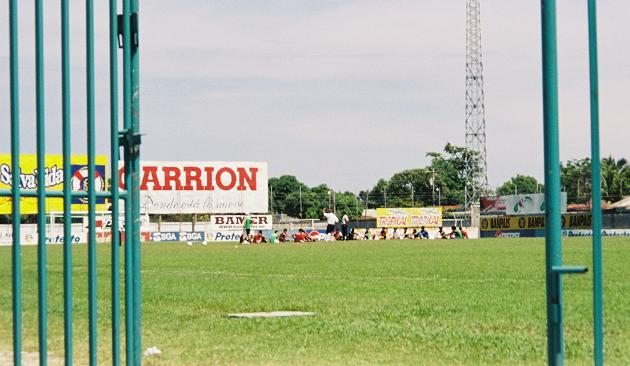
- Estadio Excélsior
- Interactive map of Estadio Excelsior
- Full name: Estadio Excelsior
- Location: Puerto Cortés, Honduras
- Capacity: 7,910
- Surface: grass

Construction
- Built: 1930

Tenant
- Platense

Estadio Excelsior is a multi-purpose stadium in Puerto Cortés, Honduras. It is currently used mostly for football matches and is the home stadium of Platense. The stadium holds 10,000 people. This stadium was rebuilt during Marlon Lara administration as Mayor of Puerto Cortés
