= Juan Manuel Coello =

Honduran footballer (born 1976)

Personal information
- Full name: Juan Manuel Coello Torres
- Date of birth: 21 May 1976 (age 50)
- Place of birth: Tegucigalpa, Honduras
- Position: Midfielder

Senior career*
Years	Team	Apps	(Gls)
1994–2001	Motagua		
2006–2007	Motagua		
2007	Vida	10	(0)
2008–2009	Deportes Savio	12	(0)

International career^{‡}
1994–1995	Honduras U-20		
1998–1999	Honduras	3	(0)

Managerial career
- 2009–present: Motagua Reserves
- * Club domestic league appearances and goals ‡ National team caps and goals as of 12 December 2012

Juan Manuel Coello Torres (born 21 May 1976) is a retired Honduran association footballer.

He currently is coach of the F.C. Motagua reserves team.

== Club career ==
Coello played as a midfielder for F.C. Motagua, with whom he won several league titles, Vida and Deportes Savio.

Team	Season	Games	Start	Sub	Goal	YC	RC
Deportes Savio	2008-09 A	4	0	4	0	0	0

== International career ==
Coello was part of the Honduras national U-20 football team that participated in the 1995 FIFA World Youth Championship in Qatar. He made his senior debut in a November 1998 friendly match against Guatemala and has earned a total of 3 caps, scoring no goals. He has represented his country at the 1999 UNCAF Nations Cup.

His final international was a March 1999 UNCAF Nations Cup against Costa Rica.
