= List of football clubs in Honduras =

In Honduran football, Liga Nacional de Fútbol de Honduras is the top league followed by Liga de Ascenso. This is an incomplete list of current and past clubs.

== The list ==
Club	Ground	Year founded	Level
C.D. Abacá	El Progreso		Dissolved
Club Aduana Deportivo	Tela		Dissolved
Arsenal	Roatán	1999	2
Atlántida	La Ceiba	1927	Dissolved
Atlético Choloma	Choloma	2009	2
Atlético Español	Tegucigalpa	1971	Dissolved
Atlético Esperanzano	La Esperanza	1940	2
Atlético Gualala	Gualala	2007	2
Atlético Independiente	Siguatepeque	1960	2
Atlético Indio	Tegucigalpa	unknown	Dissolved
Atlético Infop	Choloma	2008	Dissolved
Atlético Junior	El Negrito	1980	2
Atlético Limeño	La Lima	unknown	2
Atlético Morazán	Tegucigalpa	1970	Dissolved
Atlético Municipal	Santa Cruz de Yojoa	1980	Dissolved
Atlético Olanchano / Campamento	Catacamas	1974	2
Boca Júnior	Tocoa	1974	2
Brasilia	Río Lindo	1970	2
Broncos	Choluteca	unknown	Dissolved
CARDVA	Coyoles Central	2015	2
Cobán Athletic	Jesús de Otoro	2007	2
Comayagua	Comayagua	1945	2
Congolón	Ocotepeque	1980	3
Cruz Azul	San José de Colinas	unknown	2
Curacao	Tegucigalpa	unknown	Dissolved
Dandy	San Pedro Sula	unknown	Dissolved
Deportes Concepción	San Marcos	unknown	3
Deportes Progreseño	El Progreso	unknown	Dissolved
Deportes Savio	Santa Rosa de Copán	1964	2
Discua Nicolás	El Progreso	Unknown	2
Federal	Tegucigalpa	1935	Dissolved
E.A.C.I.	Olanchito	unknown	Dissolved
Galaxy	Coxen Hole	2002	2
Gimnástico	Tegucigalpa	1949	2
Guaimaca	Guaimaca	unknown	3
Hibueras	La Lima	unknown	3
Honduras / Progreso	El Progreso	1955	1
Honduras Salzburg	El Progreso	unknown	Dissolved
Independiente Villela	El Progreso	unknown	Dissolved
Juticalpa	Juticalpa	2004	1
La Salle / San Pedro	San Pedro Sula	unknown	Dissolved
La Virtud	Gracias	unknown	3
Las Delicias	San Francisco de la Paz	2009	3
Lempira	La Lima	unknown	Dissolved
Lenca	El Progreso	unknown	Dissolved
Lepaera	Lepaera	unknown	2
Marathón	San Pedro Sula	1925	1
Motagua	Tegucigalpa	1928	1
Motagua Reserves	Tegucigalpa	unknown	Reserves
Municipal Paceño	La Paz	unknown	2
Municipal Silca	Silca	unknown	2
Necaxa	Tegucigalpa	1954	2
Olancho	San Francisco de Becerra	2010	2
Olimpia	Tegucigalpa	1912	1
Olimpia Reservas	Talanga	unknown	Reserves
Olimpia Occidental	La Entrada	unknown	2
Palestino	San Pedro Sula	1970	Dissolved
Parrillas One	Olanchito	1993	2
Petrotela / Tela Timsa	Tela	unknown	Dissolved
Pinares	Choluteca	1975	2
Platense	Puerto Cortés	1960	1
Portuario	Puerto Cortés	unknown	Dissolved
Real Comayagua	Comayagua	unknown	Dissolved
Real De Minas	Tegucigalpa	2012	1
Real España	San Pedro Sula	1929	1
Real España Reserves	San Pedro Sula	unknown	Reserves
Real Juventud	Santa Bárbara	1965	2
Real Maya	Danlí	1985	Dissolved
Real Sociedad	Tocoa	1986	2
San Juan	Quimistán	1965	2
Santos	Siguatepeque	2017	2
Social Sol	Olanchito	1968	2
Sula	La Lima	unknown	Dissolved
Súper Estrella	Danlí	unknown	Dissolved
Talleres	Potrerillos	1981	3
Tela	Tela	2014	2
Tiburones	Choluteca	unknown	Dissolved
Troya	Tegucigalpa	1949	Dissolved
Trujillo	Trujillo	unknown	2
Unión Ájax	Trujillo	unknown	2
Universidad	Tegucigalpa	1965	Dissolved
UPNFM	Tegucigalpa	2010	1
Valencia	Choluteca	2002	Dissolved
Valle	Nacaome	unknown	3
Verdún	Tegucigalpa	unknown	Dissolved
Victoria	La Ceiba	1935	2
Victoria B	La Ceiba	unknown	Dissolved
Vida	La Ceiba	1940	1
Villanueva	Villanueva	unknown	2
Yoro	Yoro	unknown	2

- Note: E.A.C.I. stands for Empresa Asociativa Campesina de Isletas.
