= 2008–09 Honduran Liga Nacional de Ascenso =

Liga de Ascenso
- Season: 2008–09
- Champions: Apertura: Atlético Gualala; Clausura: Necaxa
- Promoted: Atlético Gualala
- All statistics correct as of 14 June 2009.

The 2008–09 Honduran Liga Nacional de Ascenso was the 42nd season of the Second level in Honduran football and the 7th under the name Liga Nacional de Ascenso. Under the management of Javier Padilla, Atlético Gualala F.C. won the tournament after defeating C.D. Necaxa in the promotion series and obtained promotion to the 2009–10 Honduran Liga Nacional. They later however, merged with C.D. Real Juventud, who had been relegated from the top level, and play in 2009–10 as Real Juventud.

== Apertura ==
=== Regular season ===
==== Standings ====
Group North A
Pos	Team	Pld	W	D	L	GF	GA	GD	Pts	Qualification
1	Social Sol	8	4	2	2	13	8	+5	14	Qualification to the Quarterfinals
2	Unión Ájax	8	4	2	2	13	9	+4	14	Qualification to the Quarterfinals
3	Arsenal	8	4	2	2	8	9	−1	14	
4	Real Sociedad	8	3	1	4	10	9	+1	10	
5	Atlético Junior	8	1	1	6	5	14	−9	4	

Group North B
Pos	Team	Pld	W	D	L	GF	GA	GD	Pts	Qualification
1	Atlético Gualala	10	7	2	1	23	6	+17	23	Qualification to the Quarterfinals
2	Cruz Azul	9	5	2	2	12	7	+5	17	Qualification to the Quarterfinals
3	Olimpia Occidental	10	4	2	4	17	14	+3	14	
4	Deportes Concepción	8	3	1	4	8	16	−8	10	
5	América Marathón	9	2	1	6	11	20	−9	7	
6	Real España Las Vegas	8	1	2	5	10	18	−8	5	

Group South A
Pos	Team	Pld	W	D	L	GF	GA	GD	Pts	Qualification
1	Olimpia Reservas	10	5	2	3	15	11	+4	17	Qualification to the Quarterfinals
2	Municipal Silca	10	5	2	3	12	8	+4	17	Qualification to the Quarterfinals
3	Municipal Paceño	10	4	4	2	12	8	+4	16	
4	Atlético Independiente	10	4	3	3	9	9	0	15	
5	Atlético Esperanzano	10	2	3	5	9	13	−4	9	
6	Hispano Reservas	10	3	0	7	8	16	−8	9	

Group South B
Pos	Team	Pld	W	D	L	GF	GA	GD	Pts	Qualification
1	Universidad	12	7	3	2	16	11	+5	24	Qualification to the Quarterfinals
2	Necaxa	12	6	4	2	17	10	+7	22	Qualification to the Quarterfinals
3	Atlético Olanchano	12	6	3	3	16	12	+4	21	
4	Águilas del Motagua	12	4	5	3	12	11	+1	17	
5	Municipal Valencia	12	3	5	4	16	14	+2	14	
6	Nuevo San Isidro	12	2	3	7	14	19	−5	9	
7	Juticalpa	12	1	3	8	13	27	−14	6	

=== Postseason ===
==== Quarterfinals ====
14 November 2008 1st leg	Atlético Gualala	1–0	Universidad	Gualala, Santa Bárbara
19:30				Stadium: Estadio Municipal de Gualala

23 November 2008 2nd leg	Universidad	1–1	Atlético Gualala	Tegucigalpa, Francisco Morazán
14:00				Stadium: Estadio Olímpico José Simón Azcona

- Atlético Gualala won 2–1 on aggregated.

15 November 2008 1st leg	Necaxa	2–0	Cruz Azul	Tegucigalpa, Francisco Morazán
14:00				Stadium: Estadio Olímpico José Simón Azcona

23 November 2008 2nd leg	Cruz Azul	0–0	Necaxa	San José de Colinas, Santa Bárbara
14:00				Stadium: Estadio Aurora

- Necaxa won 2–0 on aggregated.

16 November 2008 1st leg	Municipal Silca	1–0	Social Sol	Silca, Olancho
11:00

23 November 2008 2nd leg	Social Sol	2–3	Municipal Silca	Olanchito, Yoro
14:00				Stadium: Estadio San Jorge

- Municipal Silca won 4–2 on aggregated.

16 November 2008 1st leg	Unión Ájax	5–1	Olimpia Reservas	Trujillo, Colón
14:00	R. Quioto; L. Quioto; Hernández; Gutiérrez		Elvir	Stadium: Estadio Jorge Leonidas García

22 November 2008 2nd leg	Olimpia Reservas	2–2	Unión Ájax	Tegucigalpa, Francisco Morazán
14:00				Stadium: Estadio Olímpico José Simón Azcona

- Unión Ájax won 7–3 on aggregated.

==== Semifinals ====
29 November 2008 1st leg	Necaxa	2–1	Atlético Gualala	Tegucigalpa, Francisco Morazán
14:00				Stadium: Estadio Olímpico José Simón Azcona

5 December 2008 2nd leg	Atlético Gualala	4–2	Necaxa	Santa Bárbara, Santa Bárbara
19:30				Stadium: Estadio Argelio Sabillón

- Atlético Gualala won 5–4 on aggregated.

29 November 2008 1st leg	Unión Ájax	1–0	Municipal Silca	Trujillo, Colón
15:00				Stadium: Estadio Jorge Leonidas García

6 December 2008 2nd leg	Municipal Silca	1–0 (5–4 p)	Unión Ájax	Silca, Olancho
12:00

- Municipal Silca 1–1 Unión Ájax on aggregated. Municipal Silca won 5–4 on penalty shoot-outs.

==== Final ====
12 December 2008 1st leg	Atlético Gualala	4–2	Municipal Silca	Santa Bárbara, Santa Bárbara
19:30	Romero 20' 70'; Cálix 43'; Batiz 76'		25' 83' Lanza	Stadium: Estadio Argelio Sabillón; Referee: Marlon Muñoz

20 December 2008 2nd leg	Municipal Silca	1–1	Atlético Gualala	Salamá, Olancho
14:00	Lanza		Romero	Stadium: Estadio José Rigoberto Alemán; Attendance: 562; Referee: Ricardo Zelaya

- Atlético Gualala won 5–3 on aggregated.

== Clausura ==
=== Regular season ===
==== Standings ====
Group North A
Pos	Team	Pld	W	D	L	GF	GA	GD	Pts	Qualification
1	Social Sol	8	4	3	1	11	7	+4	15	Qualification to the Quarterfinals
2	Atlético Junior	8	4	1	3	8	8	0	13	Qualification to the Quarterfinals
3	Unión Ájax	8	3	3	2	7	6	+1	12	
4	Arsenal	8	1	4	3	6	7	−1	7	
5	Real Sociedad	8	1	3	4	7	11	−4	6	

Group North B
Pos	Team	Pld	W	D	L	GF	GA	GD	Pts	Qualification
1	Real España Las Vegas	8	4	3	1	18	13	+5	15	Qualification to the Quarterfinals
2	Olimpia Occidental	8	2	3	3	14	16	−2	9	Qualification to the Quarterfinals
3	América Marathón	8	2	3	3	9	12	−3	9	
4	Atlético Gualala	8	3	4	1	16	12	+4	7 (Note: Atlético Gualala 6 points deducted for not complying with youth player regulations.)	
5	Cruz Azul	8	1	3	4	17	21	−4	6	
6	Deportes Concepción	0	0	0	0	0	0	0	0 (Note: Deportes Concepción excluded for failing to show for two consecutive matches (last Apertura and first Clausura).)	Excluded

Notes:

Group South A
Pos	Team	Pld	W	D	L	GF	GA	GD	Pts	Qualification
1	Atlético Esperanzano	7	3	4	0	9	5	+4	13	Qualification to the Quarterfinals
2	Municipal Silca	7	3	2	2	6	5	+1	11	Qualification to the Quarterfinals
3	Olimpia Reservas	7	2	3	2	7	7	0	9	
4	Atlético Independiente	7	1	5	1	4	5	−1	8	
5	Hispano	7	1	3	3	6	7	−1	6	
6	Municipal Paceño	7	1	3	3	8	11	−3	6	

Group South B
Pos	Team	Pld	W	D	L	GF	GA	GD	Pts	Qualification
1	Necaxa	7	5	2	0	13	4	+9	17	Qualification to the Quarterfinals
2	Atlético Olanchano	7	4	0	3	10	10	0	12	Qualification to the Quarterfinals
3	Águilas del Motagua	7	2	4	1	5	4	+1	10	
4	Universidad	6	3	0	3	10	7	+3	9	
5	Nuevo San Isidro	7	2	2	3	5	9	−4	8	
6	Juticalpa	7	1	3	3	4	7	−3	6	
7	Municipal Valencia	7	0	3	4	2	8	−6	3	

=== Postseason ===
==== Quarterfinals ====
25 April 2009 1st leg	Atlético Junior	0–0	Necaxa	El Negrito, Yoro

3 May 2009 2nd leg	Necaxa	2–1	Atlético Junior	Tegucigalpa, Francisco Morazán
				Stadium: Estadio Olímpico José Simón Azcona

- Necaxa won 2–1 on aggregated.

25 April 2009 1st leg	Atlético Independiente	0–0	Social Sol	Siguatepeque, Comayagua
				Stadium: Estadio Roberto Martínez Ávila

2 May 2009 2nd leg	Social Sol	2–1	Atlético Independiente	Olanchito, Yoro
				Stadium: Estadio San Jorge

- Social Sol won 2–1 on aggregated.

26 April 2009 1st leg	Atlético Olanchano	2–1	Real España Las Vegas	Catacamas, Olancho
				Stadium: Estadio Rubén Guifarro

2 May 2009 2nd leg	Real España Las Vegas	1–2	Atlético Olanchano	San Pedro Sula, Cortés

- Atlético Olanchano won 4–2 on aggregated.

26 April 2009 1st leg	Olimpia Occidental	1–3	Atlético Esperanzano	La Entrada, Copán
				Stadium: Estadio Alsacias

3 May 2009 2nd leg	Atlético Esperanzano	0–3	Olimpia Occidental	La Esperanza, Intibucá
				Stadium: Estadio Romualdo Bueso

- Olimpia Occidental won 4–3 on aggregated.

==== Semifinals ====
10 May 2009 1st leg	Atlético Olanchano	1–1	Necaxa	Catacamas, Olancho
				Stadium: Estadio Rubén Guifarro

17 May 2009 2nd leg	Necaxa	2–1	Atlético Olanchano	Tegucigalpa, Francisco Morazán
				Stadium: Estadio Olímpico José Simón Azcona

- Necaxa won 3–2 on aggregated.

10 May 2009 1st leg	Olimpia Occidental	1–0	Social Sol	La Entrada, Copán
				Stadium: Estadio Alsacias

17 May 2009 2nd leg	Social Sol	2–0	Olimpia Occidental	Olanchito, Yoro
				Stadium: Estadio San Jorge

- Social Sol won 2–1 on aggregated.

==== Final ====
24 May 2009 1st leg	Social Sol	1–1	Necaxa	Olanchito, Yoro
				Stadium: Estadio San Jorge

31 May 2009 2nd leg	Necaxa	1–1 (4–1 p)	Social Sol	Tegucigalpa, Francisco Morazán

- Necaxa 2–2 Social Sol on aggregated. Necaxa won 4–1 on penalty shoot-outs.

== Promotion ==
7 June 2009 1st leg	Necaxa	1–1	Atlético Gualala	Tegucigalpa, Francisco Morazán

14 June 2009 2nd leg	Atlético Gualala	1–0	Necaxa	Gualala, Santa Bárbara
				Stadium: Estadio Municipal de Gualala

- Atlético Gualala won 2–1 on aggregated.
