= 2009–10 Honduran Liga Nacional de Ascenso =

Football league season

The 2009–10 Liga Nacional de Ascenso de Honduras season is the 31st season of the Liga Nacional de Ascenso de Honduras, the second division of football in Honduras. It is contested by 28 teams, split into two zones with two divisions each.

The season is split into two separate competitions, the Apertura and the Clausura. After the end of the Clausura, the winners of both competitions will face off against each other in order to determine the team which will earn promotion to the Liga Nacional de Fútbol de Honduras for the 2010–11 season.

== Teams ==
Central zone – Group A Atlético Esperanzano Atlético Independiente Aguilas Municipal Paceño FBO Universidad Real Sociedad Central zone – Group B Atlético Olanchano Juticalpa Nuevo San Isidro Necaxa Municipal Silca Municipal Valencia FC Concordia	Nor-occidental zone – Group A Arsenal Atlético Junior Real Sociedad Social Sol Unión Ájax Sonaguera FC Yoro FC Nor-occidental – Group B Cruz Azul América Olimpia Occidental Las Vegas Atlético Gualala Estudiantes Atlético Choloma

== Torneo Apertura ==
The 2009–10 Apertura began on ???? 2009 with the first matches of the regular season and ended on 20 December 2009 with the second leg of the Finals. It was won by Necaxa, who beat Atlético Choloma in the Finals with an aggregated score of 3–1.

=== Regular season ===
Each of the seven teams in every group played its opponents once at home and once away for a total of twelve matches. The top two teams of each group qualified for the Final Round.

==== Zona Central Group A ====
Pos	Team	Pld	W	D	L	GF	GA	GD	Pts	Qualification
1	Motagua B	11	6	2	3	19	9	+10	20	Qualification for Final Round
2	Atlético Esperanzano	12	5	4	3	14	8	+6	19	Qualification for Final Round
3	Olimpia B	11	5	1	5	24	20	+4	16	
4	Municipal Paceño	11	5	1	5	9	16	−7	16	
5	Universidad	11	3	5	3	13	17	−4	14	
6	Atlético Independiente	11	2	5	4	11	12	−1	11	
7	Real Sociedad	11	3	2	6	10	18	−8	11	

Source: RSSSF
Rules for classification: 1) points; 2) goal difference; 3) number of goals scored.

Note: The standings are incomplete.

==== Zona Central Group B ====
Pos	Team	Pld	W	D	L	GF	GA	GD	Pts	Qualification
1	Necaxa	11	9	2	0	22	8	+14	29	Qualification for Final Round
2	Nuevo San Isidro	11	5	3	3	13	10	+3	18	
3	Municipal Silca	11	5	2	4	16	13	+3	17	
4	Atlético Olanchano	11	5	1	5	21	21	0	16	Qualification for Final Round
5	Concordia	12	2	6	4	12	18	−6	12	
6	Valencia	11	2	4	5	15	19	−4	10	
7	Juticalpa	11	1	2	8	7	17	−10	5	

Source: RSSSF
Rules for classification: 1) points; 2) goal difference; 3) number of goals scored.

Note: The standings are incomplete.

==== Zona Nor-occidental Group A ====
Pos	Team	Pld	W	D	L	GF	GA	GD	Pts	Qualification
1	Arsenal	12	7	2	3	16	13	+3	23	Qualification for Final Round
2	Social Sol	12	6	4	2	19	8	+11	22	Qualification for Final Round
3	Yoro	12	5	3	4	10	10	0	18	
4	Sonaguera	12	5	2	5	16	12	+4	17	
5	Unión Ajax	12	4	5	3	9	6	+3	17	
6	Real Sociedad	12	2	4	6	7	16	−9	10	
7	Atlético Junior	12	2	2	8	11	23	−12	8	

Source: RSSSF
Rules for classification: 1) points; 2) goal difference; 3) number of goals scored.

==== Zona Nor-Occidental Group B ====
Pos	Team	Pld	W	D	L	GF	GA	GD	Pts	Qualification
1	Olimpia Occidental	11	7	2	2	26	20	+6	23	Qualification for Final Round
2	Cruz Azul	12	5	4	3	21	20	+1	19	
3	Atlético Choloma	11	5	2	4	22	19	+3	17	Qualification for Final Round
4	Marathón B	10	4	3	3	19	12	+7	15	
5	Real España B	12	2	6	4	15	17	−2	12	
6	Real Juventud B	10	2	4	4	13	18	−5	10	
7	Universidad Independiente	12	2	3	7	17	27	−10	9	

Source: RSSSF
Rules for classification: 1) points; 2) goal difference; 3) number of goals scored.

Note: The standings are incomplete.

=== Final round ===
==== Quarterfinals ====
2009-11-06

Atlético Choloma	2–2	Motagua B

Choloma
2009-11-08

Atlético Esperanzano	1–0	Social Sol
Ayala

La Esperanza
2009-11-08

Arsenal	0–0	Necaxa

Coxen Hole
2009-11-08

Atletico Olanchano	1–3	Olimpia Occidental
Morán		Pinto; Ruiz; Crisantos

Catacamas

2009-11-10
16:00

Motagua B	0–1	Atlético Choloma
		Caceres

Tegucigalpa
2009-11-15
14:00

Social Sol	2–0	Atlético Esperanzano

Olanchito
2009-11-15
14:00

Necaxa	2–0	Arsenal

Tegucigalpa
2009-11-15
14:00

Olimpia Occidental	3–1	Atletico Olanchano

La Entrada

==== Semifinals ====
2009-11-20

Atlético Choloma	1–2	Social Sol

Choloma
2009-11-22

Olimpia Occidental	0–0	Necaxa

La Entrada

2009-12-06

Necaxa	3–0	Olimpia Occidental

Tegucigalpa
2009-12-06

Social Sol	0–2	Atlético Choloma

Olanchito

==== Final ====
2009-12-12

Atlético Choloma	1–0	Necaxa
Cáceres 65'

Choloma
Attendance: 600~

2009-12-20
14:00

Necaxa	3–0	Atlético Choloma
Licona 14' 29'; Costa 90'

Tegucigalpa
Referee: Armando Castro
- Necaxa won on 3–1 on aggregate score.

Liga de Ascenso
2009–10 Apertura champion

2nd title

== Torneo Clausura ==
The Torneo Clausura will begin on ???? 2010 with the first matches of the regular season and end on ???? 2010 with the second leg of the Finals.

=== Regular season ===
==== Zona Central Group A ====
Pos	Team	Pld	W	D	L	GF	GA	GD	Pts	Qualification
1	Atlético Esperanzano	0	0	0	0	0	0	0	0	Qualification for Final Round
2	Atlético Independiente	0	0	0	0	0	0	0	0	Qualification for Final Round
3	Motagua B	0	0	0	0	0	0	0	0	
4	Municipal Paceño	0	0	0	0	0	0	0	0	
5	Olimpia B	0	0	0	0	0	0	0	0	
6	Real Sociedad	0	0	0	0	0	0	0	0	
7	Universidad	0	0	0	0	0	0	0	0	

Source: RSSSF
Rules for classification: 1) points; 2) goal difference; 3) number of goals scored.

==== Zona Central Group B ====
Pos	Team	Pld	W	D	L	GF	GA	GD	Pts	Qualification
1	Atlético Olanchano	0	0	0	0	0	0	0	0	Qualification for Final Round
2	Concordia	0	0	0	0	0	0	0	0	Qualification for Final Round
3	Juticalpa	0	0	0	0	0	0	0	0	
4	Municipal Silca	0	0	0	0	0	0	0	0	
5	Necaxa	0	0	0	0	0	0	0	0	
6	Nuevo San Isidro	0	0	0	0	0	0	0	0	
7	Valencia	0	0	0	0	0	0	0	0	

Source: RSSSF
Rules for classification: 1) points; 2) goal difference; 3) number of goals scored.

==== Zona Nor-Occidental Group A ====
Pos	Team	Pld	W	D	L	GF	GA	GD	Pts	Qualification
1	Arsenal	0	0	0	0	0	0	0	0	Qualification for Final Round
2	Atlético Junior	0	0	0	0	0	0	0	0	Qualification for Final Round
3	Real Sociedad	0	0	0	0	0	0	0	0	
4	Social Sol	0	0	0	0	0	0	0	0	
5	Sonaguera	0	0	0	0	0	0	0	0	
6	Unión Ajax	0	0	0	0	0	0	0	0	
7	Yoro	0	0	0	0	0	0	0	0	

Source: RSSSF
Rules for classification: 1) points; 2) goal difference; 3) number of goals scored.

==== Zona Nor-Occidental Group B ====
Pos	Team	Pld	W	D	L	GF	GA	GD	Pts	Qualification
1	Atlético Choloma	0	0	0	0	0	0	0	0	Qualification for Final Round
2	Cruz Azul	0	0	0	0	0	0	0	0	Qualification for Final Round
3	Marathón B	0	0	0	0	0	0	0	0	
4	Olimpia Occidental	0	0	0	0	0	0	0	0	
5	Real España B	0	0	0	0	0	0	0	0	
6	Real Juventud B	0	0	0	0	0	0	0	0	
7	Universidad Independiente	0	0	0	0	0	0	0	0	

Source: RSSSF
Rules for classification: 1) points; 2) goal difference; 3) number of goals scored.

=== Final Round ===
==== Quarterfinals ====
2010-04-17

Cruz Azul	1–3	Atlético Independiente

San Pedro Sula
2010-04-17

Yoro	0–0	Necaxa

Yoro
2010-04-17

Nuevo San Isidro	1–2	Atlético Choloma

Jutiapa
2010-04-17

Motagua B	3–2	Real Sociedad
Arriola 37'; Guevara		Méndez 45+1'; Munguía

Tegucigalpa

2010-04-23

Necaxa	2–1	Yoro

Tegucigalpa
2010-04-24
19:30

Atlético Independiente	1–0	Cruz Azul

Siguatepeque
2010-04-25
19:00

Atlético Choloma	3–1	Nuevo San Isidro

Choloma
2010-04-25
15:00

Real Sociedad	3–1	Motagua

Tocoa

==== Final ====
2010-05-15
19:30

Atlético Independiente	2–1	Necaxa
Sambulá 5'; Ventura 65'		Licona 36'

Siguatepeque

2010-05-23
15:30

Necaxa	2–3	Atlético Independiente
Costa 6'; Osorio 39'		Goal

Tegucigalpa
- Atletico Independente won 2–6 on aggregate score.

Liga de Ascenso
2009–10 Clausura champion

1st title

== Promotion playoff ==
To be played between winners of Apertura and Clausura tournaments.

17 de Julio 2010

Necaxa	v	Atlético Independente
(Pen.)	2-2	Goal

25 de Julio 2010

Atletico Independente	v	Necaxa
Goal	2-2 (a.t.s.) (15–16)	Goal

- Necaxa 4–4 automatically promoted as winner of both Apertura and Clausura, Promotion playoff unnecessary.
