= 2007–08 Honduran Liga Nacional de Ascenso =

Liga de Ascenso
- Season: 2007–08
- Champions: Apertura: Real Juventud; Clausura: Real Juventud
- Promoted: Real Juventud
- All statistics correct as of 23 May 2008.

The 2007–08 Honduran Liga Nacional de Ascenso was the 41st season of the Second level in Honduran football and the 6th under the name Liga Nacional de Ascenso. Under the management of Emilio Umanzor, C.D. Real Juventud won the tournament after winning both the Apertura and Clausura seasons and obtained automatic promotion to the 2008–09 Honduran Liga Nacional.

== Apertura ==
=== Regular season ===
==== Standings ====
Group North A

Pos	Team	Pld	W	D	L	GF	GA	GD	Pts	Qualification
1	Unión Ájax	10	7	2	1	19	11	+8	23	Qualification to the Quarterfinals
2	Arsenal	10	4	4	2	13	9	+4	16	Qualification to the Quarterfinals
3	Social Sol	10	3	3	4	14	12	+2	12	
4	Lenca	10	3	3	4	10	11	−1	12	
5	Real Sociedad	10	3	2	5	11	16	−5	11	
6	América Marathón	10	1	4	5	7	15	−8	7	

Group North B

Pos	Team	Pld	W	D	L	GF	GA	GD	Pts	Qualification
1	Olimpia Occidental	12	5	5	2	12	6	+6	20	Qualification to the Quarterfinals
2	Real Juventud	10	5	2	3	11	8	+3	17	Qualification to the Quarterfinals
3	Cruz Azul	10	3	4	3	16	16	0	13	
4	Villanueva	10	3	3	4	15	15	0	12	
5	Real España Las Vegas	10	2	4	4	6	10	−4	10	
6	Atlético Gualala	10	2	4	4	9	14	−5	10	

=== Postseason ===
==== Quarterfinals ====
November 2007 1st leg	Municipal Paceño	2–1	Olimpia Occidental	La Paz, La Paz
				Stadium: Estadio Roberto Suazo Córdova

November 2007 2nd leg	Olimpia Occidental	3–0	Municipal Paceño	La Entrada, Copán
				Stadium: Estadio Alsacias

- Olimpia Occidental won 4–2 on aggregated.

November 2007 1st leg	Sureño	1–0	Unión Ájax

November 2007 2nd leg	Unión Ájax	3–1	Sureño	Trujillo, Colón
				Stadium: Estadio Jorge Leonidas García

- Unión Ájax won 3–2 on aggregated.

November 2007 1st leg	Real Juventud	2–2	Hispano	Santa Bárbara, Santa Bárbara
				Stadium: Estadio Argelio Sabillón

November 2007 2nd leg	Hispano	1–3	Real Juventud	Comayagua, Comayagua
				Stadium: Estadio Carlos Miranda

- Real Juventud won 5–3 on aggregated.

November 2007 1st leg	Arsenal	2–1	Juticalpa	Roatán, Bay Islands
				Stadium: Coxen Hole Stadium

November 2007 2nd leg	Juticalpa	1–2	Arsenal	Juticalpa, Olancho

- Arsenal won 4–2 on aggregated.

==== Semifinals ====
November 2007 1st leg	Arsenal	1–0	Olimpia Occidental	Roatán, Bay Islands
				Stadium: Coxen Hole Stadium

2007 2nd leg	Olimpia Occidental	1–1	Arsenal	La Entrada, Copán
				Stadium: Estadio Alsacias

- Arsenal won 2–1 on aggregated.

November 2007 1st leg	Real Juventud	2–1	Unión Ájax	Santa Bárbara, Santa Bárbara
				Stadium: Estadio Argelio Sabillón

2007 2nd leg	Unión Ájax	0–0	Real Juventud	Trujillo, Colón
				Stadium: Estadio Jorge Leonidas García

- Real Juventud won 2–1 on aggregated.

==== Final ====
10 December 2007 1st leg	Arsenal	1–0	Real Juventud	Roatán, Bay Islands
	Mejía 11' (pen.)			Stadium: Coxen Hole Stadium; Attendance: 512

15 December 2007 2nd leg	Real Juventud	3–1 (a.e.t.)	Arsenal	Santa Bárbara, Santa Bárbara
	Martínez 12'; Argueta 93'; Sambulá 98'		112' Forbes	Stadium: Estadio Argelio Sabillón; Attendance: 1,465

- Real Juventud won 3–2 on aggregated.

== Clausura ==
=== Regular season ===
==== Standings ====
Group North A

Pos	Team	Pld	W	D	L	GF	GA	GD	Pts	Qualification
1	Social Sol	10	4	4	2	13	9	+4	16	Qualification to the Quarterfinals
2	América Marathón	10	4	4	2	18	16	+2	16	Qualification to the Quarterfinals
3	Lenca	10	4	3	3	15	14	+1	15	
4	Real Sociedad	10	4	2	4	13	11	+2	14	
5	Unión Ájax	10	4	0	6	12	15	−3	12	
6	Arsenal	10	2	3	5	11	17	−6	9	

Group North B

Pos	Team	Pld	W	D	L	GF	GA	GD	Pts	Qualification
1	Real Juventud	10	6	3	1	16	7	+9	21	Qualification to the Quarterfinals
2	Olimpia Occidental	10	6	1	3	19	8	+11	19	Qualification to the Quarterfinals
3	Atlético Gualala	10	5	2	3	7	11	−4	17	
4	Real España Las Vegas	10	3	3	4	11	11	0	12	
5	Villanueva	10	1	5	4	6	15	−9	8	
6	Cruz Azul	10	1	2	7	10	17	−7	5	

=== Postseason ===
==== Quarterfinals ====
20 April 2008 1st leg	Águilas del Motagua	0–0	América Marathón	Tegucigalpa, Francisco Morazán
				Stadium: Estadio Olímpico José Simón Azcona

26 April 2008 2nd leg	América Marathón	3–4	Águilas del Motagua	San Juan Pueblo, Atlántida

- Águilas del Motagua won 4–3 on aggregated.

20 April 2008 1st leg	Social Sol	4–0	Universidad	Olanchito, Yoro
				Stadium: Estadio San Jorge

26 April 2008 2nd leg	Universidad	1–2	Social Sol	Tegucigalpa, Francisco Morazán

- Social Sol won 6–1 on aggregated.

20 April 2008 1st leg	Municipal Paceño	0–2	Real Juventud	La Paz, La Paz
				Stadium: Estadio Roberto Suazo Córdova

26 April 2008 2nd leg	Real Juventud	2–1	Municipal Paceño	Santa Bárbara, Santa Bárbara
				Stadium: Estadio Argelio Sabillón

- Real Juventud won 4–1 on aggregated.

20 April 2008 1st leg	Olimpia Occidental	3–3	Olimpia Reservas	La Entrada, Copán
				Stadium: Estadio Alsacias

26 April 2008 2nd leg	Olimpia Reservas	2–0	Olimpia Occidental	Talanga, Francisco Morazán
				Stadium: Estadio Municipal de Talanga

- Olimpia Reservas won 5–3 on aggregated.

==== Semifinals ====
4 May 2008 1st leg	Águilas del Motagua	0–0	Social Sol	Tegucigalpa, Francisco Morazán
				Stadium: Estadio Olímpico José Simón Azcona

11 May 2008 2nd leg	Social Sol	1–0	Águilas del Motagua	Olanchito, Yoro
				Stadium: Estadio San Jorge

- Social Sol won 1–0 on aggregated.

4 May 2008 1st leg	Real Juventud	2–1	Olimpia Reservas	Santa Bárbara, Santa Bárbara
				Stadium: Estadio Argelio Sabillón

11 May 2008 2nd leg	Olimpia Reservas	0–0	Real Juventud	Talanga, Francisco Morazán
				Stadium: Estadio Municipal de Talanga

- Real Juventud won 2–1 on aggregated.

==== Final ====
18 May 2008 1st leg	Social Sol	0–0	Real Juventud	Olanchito, Yoro
				Stadium: Estadio San Jorge

23 May 2008 2nd leg	Real Juventud	3–1	Social Sol	Santa Bárbara, Santa Bárbara
	Sambulá 71'; Córdoba 87'; Róchez 90'		35' Zelaya	Stadium: Estadio Argelio Sabillón; Attendance: 2,602; Referee: Ricardo Zelaya

- Real Juventud won 3–1 on aggregated.

== Promotion ==
As winners of both Apertura and Clausura, C.D. Real Juventud obtained automatic promotion to 2008–09 Honduran Liga Nacional and no promotion series was required.
