= List of football stadiums in Honduras =

This is a partial list of football stadiums in Honduras, ranked in descending order of capacity.

== Current stadiums ==
#	Image	Stadium	Capacity	Home team
1		Estadio Olímpico Metropolitano	40,000	Honduras national football team
2		Estadio Nacional Chelato Uclés	36,000	Motagua / Olimpia
3		Estadio Nilmo Edwards	25,000	Victoria / Vida
4		Estadio Francisco Morazán	21,000	Real España
5		Estadio Juan Ramón Brevé Vargas	20,000	Juticalpa
6		Estadio Yankel Rosenthal	15,000	Marathón
7		Estadio Carlos Miranda	10,000	Comayagua
8		Estadio Roberto Suazo Córdoba	8,000	Municipal Paceño
9		Estadio Emilio Williams Agasse	8,000	Broncos del Sur
10		Estadio Excélsior	7,910	Platense
11		Estadio José Trinidad Reyes	7,500	Pumas UNAH
12		Estadio Fausto Flores Lagos	5,000	Broncos
13		Estadio Rubén Guifarro	5,000	Atlético Olanchano
14		Estadio Sergio Antonio Reyes	5,000	Deportes Savio
15		Estadio Argelio Sabillón	5,000	Real Juventud
16		Estadio Marcelo Tinoco	5,000	Real Maya
17		Estadio Humberto Micheletti	5,000	Honduras Progreso
18		Estadio León Gómez	5,000	Tela Timsa / Petrotela & Parrillas One
19		Estadio Juan Orlando Hernández	5,000	Lepaera
20		Estadio Roberto Martínez Ávila	4,000	Atlético Independiente
21		Estadio FENAFUTH	3,000	Sula
22		Estadio San Jorge	3,000	Social Sol
23		Estadio Francisco Martínez Durón	3,000	Real Sociedad
24		Coxen Hole Stadium	3,000	Arsenal
25		Estadio Alsalsias	3,000	Olimpia Occidental
26		Estadio José Adrián Cruz	3,000	Villanueva
27		Estadio Municipal de Savá	3,000	Aguan Valle
28		Estadio San Juan	2,000	America-Marathon
29		Estadio Tomás Zambrano	2,000	Gremio
30		Estadio Colonia Fesitrahn	1,000	
31		Estadio Meliton Dubón	1,000	
32		Estadio Oro Verde	1,000	

All stadiums except Estadio Yankel Rosenthal are owned by the municipality.

== See also ==
- List of association football stadiums by capacity
- List of association football stadiums by country
- List of sports venues by capacity
- Lists of stadiums
