= 2009 CONCACAF U-17 Championship squads =

== Group A ==
=== Canada ===
Head coach: (Canada) Sean Flemming

No.	Pos.	Player	Date of birth (age)	Caps	Goals	Club
1	GK	Richard Causton	15 March 1992 (aged 17)			(Canadian Soccer Association) Vancouver Whitecaps
2	DF	Hugo LaPointe-Senecal	2 January 1993 (aged 16)			(Canadian Soccer Association) Royal-Sélect de Beauport
3	DF	Feras Samain	30 June 1992 (aged 16)			(Canadian Soccer Association) Toronto FC
4	DF	Francesco Augustin	3 February 1992 (aged 17)			(Canadian Soccer Association) Trois-Rivières Attak
5	DF	Derrick Bassi	29 February 1992 (aged 17)			(The Football Association) Middlesbrough
6	MF	Felix Cardin	6 July 1992 (aged 16)			(Canadian Soccer Association) Trois-Rivières Attak
7	MF	Jonathan Lao	8 April 1993 (aged 16)			(Canadian Soccer Association) Toronto FC
8	FW	Jaineil Hoilett	11 May 1992 (aged 16)			(German Football Association) FC St. Pauli
9	FW	Jordan Ongaro	14 January 1992 (aged 17)			(Canadian Soccer Association) Edmonton Scottish
10	FW	Abdoulaye Sylla	12 October 1992 (aged 16)			(French Football Federation) Metz
11	MF	Russell Teibert	22 December 1992 (aged 16)			(Canadian Soccer Association) Vancouver Whitecaps
12	MF	Kevin Cobby	31 March 1992 (aged 17)			(Canadian Soccer Association) Vancouver Whitecaps
13	MF	Brennan McNicoll	29 November 1992 (aged 16)			(Canadian Soccer Association) Toronto FC
14	FW	Coulton Jackson	10 February 1992 (aged 17)			(Canadian Soccer Association) Vancouver Whitecaps
15	DF	Amine Meftouh	4 January 1992 (aged 17)			(Canadian Soccer Association) Trois-Rivières Attak
16	FW	Caolan Lavery	22 October 1992 (aged 16)			(Canadian Soccer Association) Red Deer Renegades
18	MF	Ezequiel Lubocki	14 June 1992 (aged 16)			(Canadian Soccer Association) Lucania
19	FW	Justin Maheu	23 January 1992 (aged 17)			(Canadian Soccer Association) Toronto FC
20	DF	Karl Ouimette	18 June 1992 (aged 16)			(Canadian Soccer Association) Trois-Rivières Attak
22	GK	Garrett Cyprus	13 May 1992 (aged 16)			(Canadian Soccer Association) Toronto FC

=== Cuba ===
Head coach: (Cuba) Alexander González

No.	Pos.	Player	Date of birth (age)	Caps	Goals	Club
1	GK	Odisnel Cooper	31 March 1992 (aged 17)			(Football Association of Cuba) La Habana
2	DF	Yandry Prieto	28 October 1992 (aged 16)			(Football Association of Cuba) La Habana
3	DF	Yordan Expósito	22 July 1992 (aged 16)			(Football Association of Cuba) La Habana
4	DF	Daniel Cantero	3 December 1992 (aged 16)			(Football Association of Cuba) La Habana
5	DF	Liosvel Hernández	14 March 1992 (aged 17)			(Football Association of Cuba) La Habana
6	MF	Over Urgelles	14 January 1992 (aged 17)			(Football Association of Cuba) Guantánamo
8	MF	Raydel Fernández	18 January 1992 (aged 17)			(Football Association of Cuba) Camagüey
9	FW	Yaudel Lahera	9 February 1992 (aged 17)			(Football Association of Cuba) La Habana
10	MF	Luis Portal	19 January 1992 (aged 17)			(Football Association of Cuba) La Habana
11	FW	Randy Lizama	16 July 1992 (aged 16)			(Football Association of Cuba) La Habana
12	GK	Yeimi Guerra	30 December 1992 (aged 16)			(Football Association of Cuba) La Habana
13	MF	Alejandro Márquez	12 May 1992 (aged 16)			(Football Association of Cuba) La Habana
14	FW	Dayron Blanco	2 October 1992 (aged 16)			(Football Association of Cuba) La Habana
15	MF	Yadien Ortiz	18 January 1992 (aged 17)			(Football Association of Cuba) Matanzas
16	MF	Ricardo Peña	21 December 1992 (aged 16)			(Football Association of Cuba) La Habana
17	MF	Humberto Puig	26 August 1992 (aged 16)			(Football Association of Cuba) Granma
18	FW	Ovaldo Lemus	1 May 1992 (aged 16)			(Football Association of Cuba) La Habana
20	MF	Osdany Soto	12 April 1992 (aged 17)			(Football Association of Cuba) La Habana

=== Honduras ===
Head coach: (Honduras) Emilio Umanzor

No.	Pos.	Player	Date of birth (age)	Caps	Goals	Club
1	GK	Jesús Rivera	26 June 1993 (aged 15)			(National Autonomous Federation of Football of Honduras) Motagua B
2	DF	Nixon Duarte	24 May 1992 (aged 16)			(National Autonomous Federation of Football of Honduras) Real España B
3	DF	Johny Rivera	27 April 1992 (aged 16)			(National Autonomous Federation of Football of Honduras) Real España B
4	DF	Ever Alvarado	30 January 1992 (aged 17)			(National Autonomous Federation of Football of Honduras) Atlético Junior
5	DF	Helder Martínez	3 March 1992 (aged 17)			(National Autonomous Federation of Football of Honduras) Gimnástico
6	DF	Allan Gutiérrez	11 January 1992 (aged 17)			(National Autonomous Federation of Football of Honduras) Motagua B
7	MF	Wilmer Fuentes	21 April 1992 (aged 17)			(National Autonomous Federation of Football of Honduras) Marathón B
8	DF	Roberto López	15 April 1992 (aged 17)			(National Autonomous Federation of Football of Honduras) Motagua B
9	FW	Diego Rodríguez	20 April 1993 (aged 16)			(National Autonomous Federation of Football of Honduras) Real España B
10	MF	Alexánder López	5 June 1992 (aged 16)			(National Autonomous Federation of Football of Honduras) Olimpia B
11	FW	Anthony Lozano	25 April 1993 (aged 15)			(National Autonomous Federation of Football of Honduras) Olimpia
12	GK	Harold Fonseca	8 October 1993 (aged 15)			(National Autonomous Federation of Football of Honduras) Motagua B
13	DF	José Tobías	20 January 1992 (aged 17)			(National Autonomous Federation of Football of Honduras) Real España B
14	DF	Allan Rivas	6 January 1992 (aged 17)			(National Autonomous Federation of Football of Honduras) Olimpia B
15	FW	Rosendo González	21 January 1992 (aged 17)			(National Autonomous Federation of Football of Honduras) Olimpia B
16	MF	Jair Aragón	26 October 1992 (aged 16)			(National Autonomous Federation of Football of Honduras) Real Juventud
17	FW	José Sánchez	24 January 1992 (aged 17)			(National Autonomous Federation of Football of Honduras) Victoria
18	MF	Néstor Martínez	4 May 1992 (aged 16)			(National Autonomous Federation of Football of Honduras) Olimpia B
19	FW	Héctor Matute	5 April 1992 (aged 17)			(National Autonomous Federation of Football of Honduras) Atlético Gualala

=== United States ===
Head coach: Wilmer Cabrera

No.	Pos.	Player	Date of birth (age)	Caps	Goals	Club
1	GK	Earl Edwards	January 24, 1992 (aged 17)			(United States Soccer Federation) La Jolla Nomads SC
2	DF	Eriq Zavaleta	August 2, 1992 (aged 16)			(United States Soccer Federation) FC Pride
3	DF	Tyler Polak	May 13, 1992 (aged 16)			(United States Soccer Federation) Capital Soccer Academy
4	DF	Perry Kitchen	February 29, 1992 (aged 17)			(United States Soccer Federation) Chicago Magic AS Monaco
5	MF	Marlon Duran	January 25, 1992 (aged 17)			(United States Soccer Federation) Latino Americano
6	DF	Jared Watts	February 3, 1992 (aged 17)			(United States Soccer Federation) North Meck SC
7	FW	Stefan Jerome	August 11, 1992 (aged 16)			(United States Soccer Federation) West Pines United FC
8	DF	Alex Shinsky	April 2, 1993 (aged 16)			(United States Soccer Federation) Super Nova FC
9	FW	Jack McInerney	August 5, 1992 (aged 16)			(United States Soccer Federation) Cobb SC
10	MF	Luis Gil	November 14, 1993 (aged 15)			(United States Soccer Federation) Pateadores
11	MF	Dustin Corea	March 21, 1992 (aged 17)			(United States Soccer Federation) East Side United FC
12	DF	Emilio Orozco	April 29, 1992 (aged 16)			(United States Soccer Federation) Rampage FC
13	FW	Joseph Gyau	September 16, 1992 (aged 16)			(United States Soccer Federation) FC DELCO
14	DF	Zachary Herold	June 7, 1992 (aged 16)			(United States Soccer Federation) West Pines United FC
15	MF	Carlos Martínez	January 21, 1992 (aged 17)			(United States Soccer Federation) Wilmington Jr.
16	MF	Nicholas Palodichuk	September 15, 1992 (aged 16)			(United States Soccer Federation) Washington Premier FC
17	FW	Juan Agudelo	November 23, 1992 (aged 16)			(United States Soccer Federation) New York Red Bulls Academy
18	GK	Spencer Richey	May 30, 1992 (aged 16)			(United States Soccer Federation) Crossfire Premier
19	MF	Andy Craven	January 21, 1992 (aged 17)			(United States Soccer Federation) First Coast Kicks
20	MF	Sebastian Lletget	September 3, 1992 (aged 16)			(United States Soccer Federation) Santa Clara SC

== Group B ==
=== Costa Rica ===
Head coach: (Costa Rica) Juan Diego Quesada

No.	Pos.	Player	Date of birth (age)	Caps	Goals	Club
1	GK	Ricardo Alonso Rojas	January 3, 1992 (aged 17)			(Costa Rican Football Federation) Alajuelense
2	DF	Irving Huertas	February 21, 1993 (aged 16)			No club
3	DF	Jean Carlos Sánchez	April 19, 1992 (aged 17)			No club
4	DF	Alejandro Calderón	February 26, 1992 (aged 17)			(Costa Rican Football Federation) Herediano
5	MF	Pablo Martínez	January 14, 1992 (aged 17)			(Costa Rican Football Federation) Alajuelense
6	MF	Felipe Santibáñez	February 21, 1992 (aged 17)			NA
7	FW	Danny Blanco	September 1, 1992 (aged 16)			(Costa Rican Football Federation) Alajuelense
8	MF	Golobio Bustos	July 9, 1992 (aged 16)			(Costa Rican Football Federation) Saprissa
9	FW	Jonathan Moya	January 6, 1992 (aged 17)			(Costa Rican Football Federation) Saprissa
10	FW	Deyver Vega	September 19, 1992 (aged 16)			(Costa Rican Football Federation) Saprissa
11	FW	Joel Campbell	June 26, 1992 (aged 16)			(Costa Rican Football Federation) Saprissa
12	FW	Dylan Flores	May 30, 1993 (aged 15)			(Costa Rican Football Federation) Saprissa
13	DF	Federico Crespo	May 10, 1992 (aged 16)			(Costa Rican Football Federation) Saprissa
14	FW	Rosbin Mayorga	March 20, 1992 (aged 17)			No club
15	DF	Joseph Mora	January 15, 1993 (aged 16)			(Costa Rican Football Federation) Alajuelense
16	DF	Ariel Soto	May 14, 1992 (aged 16)			(Costa Rican Football Federation) Brujas
17	MF	Yeltsin Tejeda	March 17, 1992 (aged 17)			(Costa Rican Football Federation) Saprissa
18	GK	Mauricio Vargas	August 10, 1992 (aged 16)			(Costa Rican Football Federation) Alajuelense
19	MF	Josué David Rodríguez	March 10, 1992 (aged 17)			(Costa Rican Football Federation) Grecia
20	DF	Adrián Mora	February 4, 1992 (aged 17)			(Costa Rican Football Federation) Alajuelense

=== Guatemala ===
Head coach: (Guatemala) Antonio García

No.	Pos.	Player	Date of birth (age)	Caps	Goals	Club
1	GK	Eddy García	3 April 1992 (aged 17)			(National Football Federation of Guatemala) Municipal
2	DF	José Lemus	5 November 1992 (aged 16)			(National Football Federation of Guatemala) Menedy
3	MF	Edgar Gutiérrez	25 April 1992 (aged 16)			(National Football Federation of Guatemala) Municipal
4	DF	Luis Fernando Vega	15 January 1993 (aged 16)			(National Football Federation of Guatemala) Academia
5	DF	Alex Díaz	5 January 1992 (aged 17)			(National Football Federation of Guatemala) Comunicaciones
6	DF	Rafael Hernández	4 November 1992 (aged 16)			(National Football Federation of Guatemala) Municipal
7	FW	Gabriel Navas	14 May 1992 (aged 16)			(National Football Federation of Guatemala) Comunicaciones
8	MF	Marvin Ceballos	22 April 1992 (aged 16)			(National Football Federation of Guatemala) Comunicaciones
9	FW	Luis Salguero	3 January 1992 (aged 17)			(National Football Federation of Guatemala) Cobán Imperial
10	MF	Carlos Ciraiz	2 September 1993 (aged 15)			(National Football Federation of Guatemala) Municipal
11	MF	Kenroy Arana	6 February 1992 (aged 17)			(National Football Federation of Guatemala) Izabal
12	MF	Bryan Orellana	20 May 1993 (aged 15)			(National Football Federation of Guatemala) Jalapa
13	MF	José Carlos Castillo	18 February 1992 (aged 17)			(National Football Federation of Guatemala) Juventud Saleciana
14	DF	Daniel Eduardo Marín	28 March 1992 (aged 17)			(National Football Federation of Guatemala) Zacapa
15	MF	Marco Rodas	2 January 1992 (aged 17)			(National Football Federation of Guatemala) Marquense
16	MF	Gerson Lima	10 November 1992 (aged 16)			(National Football Federation of Guatemala) Jalapa
17	FW	Kendel Herrarte	6 April 1992 (aged 17)			(National Football Federation of Guatemala) Comunicaciones
18	FW	Henry López	8 August 1992 (aged 16)			(National Football Federation of Guatemala) Municipal
19	DF	Sixto Betancourt	16 May 1992 (aged 16)			(National Football Federation of Guatemala) Suchitepéquez
20	GK	Mynor Padilla	9 July 1993 (aged 15)			(National Football Federation of Guatemala) Comunicaciones

=== Mexico ===
Head coach: (Mexico) José González

No.	Pos.	Player	Date of birth (age)	Caps	Goals	Club
1	GK	José Rodríguez	4 July 1992 (aged 16)			(Mexican Football Federation) Guadalajara
2	DF	César Ibáñez	1 April 1992 (aged 17)			(Mexican Football Federation) Atlas
3	DF	Kristian Álvarez	20 April 1992 (aged 17)			(Mexican Football Federation) Guadalajara
4	DF	Jairo González	27 February 1992 (aged 17)			(Mexican Football Federation) Guadalajara
5	DF	Oscar García	8 February 1993 (aged 16)			(Mexican Football Federation) Monterrey
6	DF	Manuel Jiménez	23 March 1992 (aged 17)			(Mexican Football Federation) Veracruz
7	MF	Abraham Coronado	28 February 1992 (aged 17)			(Mexican Football Federation) Guadalajara
8	MF	Carlos Campos	13 April 1992 (aged 17)			(Mexican Football Federation) UNAM
9	FW	Cristian Ruiz	9 June 1992 (aged 16)			(Mexican Football Federation) Guadalajara
10	FW	Martín Galván	14 February 1993 (aged 16)			(Mexican Football Federation) Cruz Azul
11	FW	Gael Acosta	26 March 1992 (aged 17)			(Mexican Football Federation) Monterrey
12	GK	Israel Cano	17 September 1992 (aged 16)			(Mexican Football Federation) Monterrey
13	FW	Salvador Jasso	5 June 1992 (aged 16)			(Mexican Football Federation) Monterrey
14	FW	Christian Ortega	25 February 1992 (aged 17)			(Mexican Football Federation) Real Leonés
15	FW	Efrén Mendoza	9 June 1992 (aged 16)			(Mexican Football Federation) Atlas
16	FW	Gil Cordero	13 April 1992 (aged 17)			(Mexican Football Federation) Necaxa
17	MF	Erik Vera	24 March 1992 (aged 17)			(Mexican Football Federation) UNAM
18	DF	Diego Reyes	19 September 1992 (aged 16)			(Mexican Football Federation) América
19	FW	Víctor Mañón	6 February 1992 (aged 17)			(Mexican Football Federation) Pachuca
20	MF	Luis Telles	9 March 1992 (aged 17)			(Mexican Football Federation) Atlas

=== Trinidad and Tobago ===
Head coach: (Trinidad and Tobago) Anton Corneal

No.	Pos.	Player	Date of birth (age)	Caps	Goals	Club
	GK	John Thomas	18 November 1993 (aged 15)			(Trinidad and Tobago Football Association) Joe Public
	GK	Jamal Francois	16 September 1992 (aged 16)			(Trinidad and Tobago Football Association) San Juan Jabloteh
	DF	Deron De Freitas	22 April 1992 (aged 16)			(Trinidad and Tobago Football Association) St. Ann's Rangers
	DF	Akeems Grant	4 July 1992 (aged 16)			(Trinidad and Tobago Football Association) W Connection
	DF	Reshad Wint	12 February 1992 (aged 17)			(Trinidad and Tobago Football Association) Joe Public
	DF	Dwight Ceballo	6 June 1992 (aged 16)			(Trinidad and Tobago Football Association) San Juan Jabloteh
	DF	Dillon Kirton	25 April 1992 (aged 16)			(Trinidad and Tobago Football Association) San Juan Jabloteh
	DF	Kylon Gay	17 June 1992 (aged 16)			(Trinidad and Tobago Football Association) Joe Public
	DF	Shaquille Stewart	10 November 1993 (aged 15)			(Trinidad and Tobago Football Association) W Connection
	DF	Dinnel Lopez	15 June 1992 (aged 16)			(Trinidad and Tobago Football Association) San Juan Jabloteh
	DF	Rodney Young	10 November 1992 (aged 16)			(Trinidad and Tobago Football Association) United Petrotrin
	DF	Omarr Charles	12 March 1992 (aged 17)			(Trinidad and Tobago Football Association) Stokelyvale
	MF	Zavion Navarro	31 December 1992 (aged 16)			(Trinidad and Tobago Football Association) San Juan Jabloteh
	MF	Neil Mitchell	1 July 1992 (aged 16)			(Trinidad and Tobago Football Association) Joe Public
	MF	Shahdon Winchester	8 January 1992 (aged 17)			(Trinidad and Tobago Football Association) W Connection
	MF	Luke Hernandez	24 March 1992 (aged 17)			(Trinidad and Tobago Football Association) San Juan Jabloteh
	MF	Vernell Ramirez	19 March 1992 (aged 17)			(Trinidad and Tobago Football Association) San Juan Jabloteh
	MF	Ryan Mc Leod	2 February 1992 (aged 17)			(Canadian Soccer Association) Toronto FC
	MF	Moriba Ballah	3 January 1992 (aged 17)			(Trinidad and Tobago Football Association) San Juan Jabloteh
	MF	Ross Russell	9 January 1992 (aged 17)			(Trinidad and Tobago Football Association) Defence Force
	MF	Kedar Roderick	23 February 1993 (aged 16)			(Trinidad and Tobago Football Association) San Juan Jabloteh
	MF	Anslem Jackson	18 January 1992 (aged 17)			(Trinidad and Tobago Football Association) San Juan Jabloteh
	FW	Ryan Frederick	11 June 1992 (aged 16)			(Trinidad and Tobago Football Association) W Connection
	FW	Cordell Cato	15 July 1992 (aged 16)			(Trinidad and Tobago Football Association) San Juan Jabloteh
	FW	Jerrel Britto	4 July 1992 (aged 16)			(Trinidad and Tobago Football Association) San Juan Jabloteh
	FW	Malcolm Manswell	20 February 1992 (aged 17)			(United States Soccer Federation) Baltimore Bays
		Johan Peltier	25 March 1992 (aged 17)			(Trinidad and Tobago Football Association) San Juan Jabloteh
