= Honduran Liga Mayor =

Honduran association football league

Liga Mayor de Futbol de Honduras
- Country: Honduras
- Confederation: CONCACAF
- Number of clubs: 200+
- Level on pyramid: 3
- Promotion to: Liga de Ascenso
- Relegation to: Liga Intermedia

Liga Mayor de Honduras (Honduran Major League) is the third division of football in Honduras. It is composed of around 200 clubs divided into three different phases.

The first phase is composed of local leagues based on municipalities; each league divided in a strategic way considering geography. Champions and runner-ups qualify into separate departmental leagues in a two-header knock-out format with qualification to the regional tournament at play.

The regional tournaments are a final two-header tournament composed of the departmental league's champions and runner-ups. Each of the five regional champions obtain promotion into Liga de Ascenso de Honduras.

As of 2025, the 5 regional tournaments are:

Northern: Champions and runner-ups from Cortés, Atlántida, Colón, Yoro and Islas de la Bahía.

Central-Orient #1: Champions and runner-ups from Francisco Morazán, Olancho and El Paraíso.

Central #2: Champions and runner-ups from Comayagua, Intibucá and La Paz.

Southern: Champions and runner-ups from Valle and Choluteca.

Occidental: Champions and runner-ups from Copán, Lempira, Ocotepeque and Santa Bárbara.

== Teams ==
2025-2026 The league is divided into four regional groups.

=== Occidental (West) ===
==== Santa Barbara ====
- Real Honduras F.C. (San Luis)

=== Atlantico (Atlantic) ===
Departamental representatives for 2024-25

- Boca Junior (Tocoa, Colón)
- Atlético Limeño (La Lima, Cortés)
- Atlético Bahia (Roatán, Islas de la Bahia)
- San Juan (San Juan Pueblo, Atlántida)
- Lenca (El Progreso, Yoro)

==== Tela ====
Liga Mayor José Trinidad Cabañas

- Cerro Porteño
- Tela Deportivo
- Los Pumas
- Academia Deportiva Mingo Ramos (ADMIRA)
- San Alejo Fútbol Club
- San Jose Fútbol Club
- Broncos del Sur F.C.
- Villanueva FC
- Cruz Azul F.C. (Honduras)

==== Colón ====
Liga Mayor Gilberto Medina de Sabá (2007/08)

- Agua Caliente
- Aguan Valle
- Aguila
- Atletico Juvenil
- Atletico Valle
- Elixir
- Inter
- Saba Deportivo
- Universidad Catolica
- C.D. Deportivo Atlètico Junior (Junior Football Club) Estadio El Negrtio, Honduras
- Municipal Paceño F.C. (La Paz, Honduras) Estadio Roberto Suazo Cordoba

==== Cortés ====
Winners from each group and best loser play a quadrangular. The winner from this quadrangular plays against winners from other quadrangulars in Zona Noroccidental

Group A

- Atlético Infop (Choloma)
- Atlético Limeño (La Lima)
- Brasilia
- Esfuerzo Pirata
- Honduritas
- Productores Asociados
- San Manuel Junior
- Sicilia

Group B

- Atlético Potrerillos (Potrerillos)
- Fuerza Aérea (San Pedro Sula)
- Juventus
- Municipal Calán
- Nacional
- Real Cofradía (Cofradia)
- Real Yojoa
- Río Lindo

Group C

- AquaFinca
- Fuerzas Básicas (Puerto Cortes)
- Platense Jr. (San Pedro Sula)
- PSA
- Pumas
- San Ramón (Puerto Cortes)

Liga Mayor Carlos A. Turnbull de La Lima (2007/08)

- Atletico Limenos
- Barcelona
- Campos Dos
- Cordova
- Juventud Olimpica
- Producciones Associados
- S.D. Aguilas
- Union Chotepeña

==== Islas de la Bahia ====
- Home Boy (Roatan)
- Regional (Guanaja)
- Dortmund FC

==== Yoro ====
- Aguila (El Negrito)
- C.D. Atlético Junior (El Negrito)
- Dole

=== Sur-Centro (South-Central) ===
==== Choluteca ====
- Águila (San Marcos de Colon)
- Argentina Junior (Marcovia)
- Atlético Pumas (El Triunfo)
- Atlético Valle (Choluteca)
- Boca Junior (Marcovia)
- Danubio (Morolica)
- Fas (El Triunfo)
- Independiente (Monjaras)
- Inst. Mateo Molina (Pespire)
- León Libertador (Choluteca)
- Mar Azul (Monjaras)
- Pinares (San Marcos de Colon)
- Real Pespirense (Pespire)
- Juventus(San Jeronimo)
- Real San jeronimo tecnico: (Daniel Cruz)(San Jeronimo)

=== Other Teams - Unknown ===
- Atletico Alamesa
- Canada Estrellita
- Deportes Concepcion
- Halcones F.C.
- Juventud Estudiantil
- Luisiana F.C.
- Real Junior
- C.D.Real Mallorca

Playoffs Ida Que-Finals Atlético Limeno 1 3 Juventus 1 2 Platane 1 0 Real Junior 0 1 Fas 0 2 Dole 0 2 Pumas 2 2(4) Luisiana 2 2(5) Semifinales Juventus 1 2 Real Junior 1 0 Fas 0 3 Luisiana 1 2 Final Juventus 0 3 5 Fas El Triunfo 0 2 4

== Promotion Playoffs ==
=== Zona Norte ===
Zona Norte's (North zone) promotion is contested between Grupo Occidental (Western Group) champions and Grupo Atlantico (Atlantic Group) champions. Incomplete list.

Year	Winner	Score	Runner-up
1960-61
1961-62
1962-63
1963-64
1964-65
1965-66
1966-67
1967-68
1968-69
1969-70
1970-71
1971-72
1972-73
1973-74
1974-75
1975-76
1976-77
1977-78
1978-79
1979-80
1980-81
1981-82
1982-83
1983-84
1984-85
1985-86
1986-87
1987-88
1988-89
1989-90
1990-91	Inter	1-0 0-1	Brasilla
1991-92	Super Estrella Danil	1-1 2-1	Sula La Lima
1992-92	CD Melgar	1-0 1-1	Deportivo Progreseno
1993-94	Vida La Ceida	2-0 1-1	CD Petro Tele
1994-95	Yoro FC	1-1 2-0	Broncos Choluteca
1995-96	Independent Villa	1-1 0-2	Yoro FC
1996-97	Real Maya Denli	1-2 0-0	San Juna
1997-98	Cerro Porteno	1-0 2-1	Agua Caliente
1998-99	Atletico infop	1-1 3-2	Real Yojoa
1999-00	Lenca	1-0 1-0(3-1)	Los Pumas
2000-01	Juventud Estudiantil	0-2 1-1	Home Boy
2001-02	Aguila	1-1 1-1 Penalties 4-1	Platane FC
2002-03	Pumas	0-1 2-0	Luisiana F.C.
2003-04	Fas	1-0 0-0	PSA
2004-05	Universidad NAH Danli	1-0 2-2	Real Junior
2005-06	Olimpia Occidental	1-1; 0-0; 1-1; Penalties: 4-3	Hibueras
2006-07	Atlético Gualala	0-0; 0-0; 1-1; Penalties: 4-3	Atlético Infop
2007-08	Juventud	1-1 1-2	Dole
2008-09	Halcones	2-2 0-2	Mar Azul
2009-10	Rio Lindo	1-0 2-2	Atletico Alamesa
2010-11	Ailanza Becerra	1-1 2-1	Hispano Comayagua
2011-12	Real Honduras	0-0 1-1	Boca Junior
2012-13	Valle	2-2; 3-0; 5-2	Real Honduras
2013-14	Nacional	1-1 2-2	Pinares
2014-15	Atletico Olanchano	0-0 0-0 Penalties 4-5	Union Saba
2015-16	Estrella Roja Denli	1-0 2-2	Jaguars UPNFM
2016-17	Jaguars UPMFM	1-1 2-0 3-1	Union Saba
2017-18	Atletico Independent	1-0 1-2	Nacional San Perdro Saba
2018-19	Siguatepeque	2-2 1-3	Vall FC Nacaome
2019-20
2020-21
2021-22
2022-23
2023-24
2024-25

|- |2021-22 | | | | | |} |- |2022-23 | | | | |}

=== Zona Sur ===
Zona Sur's (South zone) promotion is contested between Grupo Oriental (Eastern Group) champions and Grupo Centro-Sur (South-Central Group) champions. Incomplete list.

Year	Winner	Score	Runner-up
1960-61
1961-62
1962-63
1963-64
1964-65
1965-66
1966-67
1967-68
1968-69
1969-70
1970-71
1971-72
1972-73
1973-74
1974-75
1975-76
1976-77
1977-78
1978-79
1979-80
1978-79
1979-80
1980-81
1981-82
1982-83
1983-84
1984-85
1985-86
1986-87
1987-88
1988-89
1989-90
1990-91
1991-92
1992-93
1993-94
1994-95
1995-96
1996-97
1997-98
1998-99
1999-00
2000-01
2001-02
2002-03
2003-04
2004-05
2005-06
2006-07
2007-08
2008-09
2009-10
2010-11
2011-12
2012-13	Valle FC	1-1; 2-0; 3-1	Juventus
2013-14
2014-15
2015-16
2016-17
2017-18
2018-19
2019-20
2020-21
2021-22
2022-23
2023-24
2024-25
