= Moacyr Filho =

Brazilian footballer

Personal information
- Full name: Moacyr Filho Domingos Demiquei
- Date of birth: 24 October 1981 (age 45)
- Place of birth: Rio Pardo, Brazil
- Height: 1.73 m (5 ft 8 in)
- Positions: Midfielder; winger

Senior career*
Years	Team	Apps	(Gls)
1998–2000	Flamengo		
2000–2001	Santa Cruz		
2001–2002	La Serena		
2002	San José		
2002–2005	Suchitepéquez		
2005–2009	FAS		
2010–2011	Necaxa		
2011	Hispano		
2012	Platense		
2013	Deportivo Carchá		
- * Club domestic league appearances and goals

Moacyr Filho Domingos Demiquei (born 24 October 1981) is a Brazilian footballer who plays as a central midfielder or left midfielder.

== Career ==
=== C.D. Necaxa ===
On 15 August 2010, Moacyr made his debut in the Liga Nacional de Futbol de Honduras with Necaxa against Real España in a 1–2 win.

== Career statistic ==
Club	Season	League		
Club	Season	Apps	Goals	Assists
Necaxa	2009–10	??	??	??
Necaxa	2010–11	14	0	1

== Honours ==
=== Clubs ===
Necaxa

- Liga Nacional de Ascenso: 2009–10 C
