= Éver Alvarado =

Honduran footballer (born 1992)

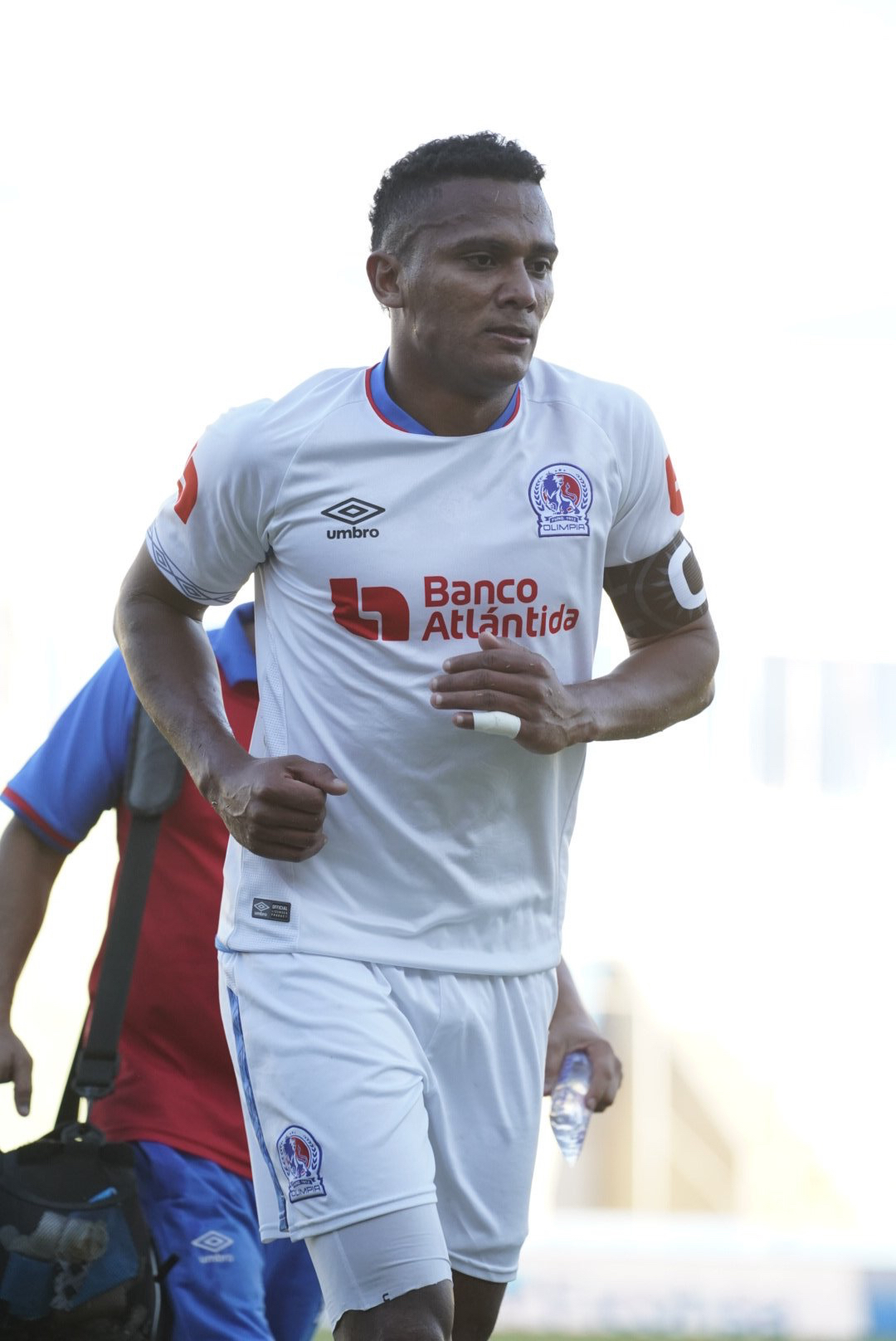
- Alvarado in 2020

Personal information
- Full name: Éver Gonzalo Alvarado Sandoval
- Date of birth: January 30, 1992 (age 34)
- Place of birth: El Negrito, Honduras
- Height: 1.79 m (5 ft 10 1/2 in)
- Position: Left-back

Team information
- Current team: Olimpia
- Number: 5

Youth career
- 2007–2009: Atlético Junior
- 2009–2011: Olimpia

Senior career*
Years	Team	Apps	(Gls)
2011–2014	Real España	57	(5)
2014–2016	Olimpia	67	(6)
2016	Sporting Kansas City	1	(0)
2016	→ Swope Park Rangers (loan)	13	(0)
2017–	Olimpia	115	(11)

International career^{‡}
2009	Honduras U17	3	(0)
2010	Honduras U21	1	(0)
2011	Honduras U20	3	(1)
2012	Honduras U23	5	(1)
2015–	Honduras	30	(1)
- * Club domestic league appearances and goals as of 21 May 2021 (UTC) ‡ National team caps and goals as of 7 June 2021 (UTC)

Éver Gonzalo Alvarado Sandoval (born 30 January 1992) is a Honduran professional footballer who plays as a left-back for Olimpia, whom he captains, and the Honduras national team.

== Club career ==
Alvarado began his professional career at Real C.D. España in 2011. He made his debut on 13 August 2011, in a 2–2 draw against C.D. Necaxa.

On 25 July 2014, he joined C.D. Olimpia and made his debut the following 29 August against Alpha United FC in the CONCACAF Champions League.

On 24 June 2016, Alvarado signed with Major League Soccer side Sporting Kansas City. He made his debut the following 16 August in a 2–2 draw with Central F.C. in the CONCACAF Champions League.

on 24 January 2017, Olimpia confirmed the return of Alvarado, along with Alexander López, to the club.

=== International goals ===
Scores and results list Honduras' goal tally first.

Goal	Date	Venue	Opponent	Score	Result	Competition
1.	27 January 2016	Estadio Nacional Dennis Martínez, Managua, Nicaragua	Nicaragua	2–1	3–1	Friendly

== Honors ==
=== Club ===
Olimpia

- CONCACAF League: 2017
