= Luciano Valerio Harry =

Honduran footballer (born 1979)

Personal information
- Full name: Luciano Valerio Harry
- Date of birth: January 19, 1979 (age 47)
- Place of birth: Tela, Honduras
- Height: 1.78 m (5 ft 10 in)
- Position: Striker

Senior career*
Years	Team	Apps	(Gls)
1999–2001	Bronco	–	(–)
2001–2002	Olimpia	–	(–)
2002–2003	Marathón	–	(–)
2003–2004	Honduras Salzburg	–	(–)
2004–2005	Universidad	–	(–)
2005–2007	Deportivo Lenca	–	(–)
2007–2008	Real Juventud	–	(–)
2009	Vista Hermosa	15	(2)
2009–2010	Atlético Choloma		
2011	Honduras Progreso		
- * Club domestic league appearances and goals

Luciano Valerio Harry (born 19 January 1979) is a Honduran footballer who last played for Honduran club Honduras Progreso.

A native of the town of Tela in Atlántida Department on the northern Caribbean coast, Luciano Valerio Harry began his career in 1999 at Club Bronco and, during the next decade, played for Club Deportivo Olimpia, Club Deportivo Marathón, Honduras Salzburg, Universidad, Deportivo Lenca and C.D. Real Juventud.
