= 1972 Honduran Cup =

Copa de Honduras Copa Jefe de Estado

Tournament details
- Country: Honduras
- Teams: 10

Final positions
- Champions: España (1st title)
- Runner-up: Marathón

Tournament statistics
- Matches played: 30
- Goals scored: 64 (2.13 per match)
- All statistics correct as of 10 December 1972.

The 1972 Honduran Cup was the second edition of the Honduran Cup, the tournament was renamed Copa Jefe de Estado due to political reasons; España won the trophy and Marathón was runner-up.

== Group stage ==
The ten participant clubs were divided into two groups of three (3) and one group of four (4). Due to the uneven number of teams on each group, the top two from group C (which contained 4 teams) advanced directly to the final round. Meanwhile, groups A and B (containing only 3 teams) had the winners advancing directly and the runners-up facing in a one leg play-off match.

=== Group A ===
Pos	Team	Pld	W	D	L	GF	GA	GD	Pts	Qualification
1	Troya	2	1	0	1	4	4	0	2	Re-match
2	Olimpia	2	1	0	1	4	4	0	2	Re-match
3	Universidad	2	1	0	1	1	1	0	2	Re-match

Updated to match(es) played on 1972. Source:

After a 3-way tie in points between all group contenders, a full rematch was scheduled between all three clubs. The games were all re-played on 19 November at Estadio Tiburcio Carías Andino with a duration of 30 minutes each. The re-match results were as follows:

19 November 1972	Universidad	1–0	Olimpia	Tegucigalpa
	Netto 26'			Stadium: Estadio Tiburcio Carías Andino

19 November 1972	Olimpia	0–0	Troya	Tegucigalpa
				Stadium: Estadio Tiburcio Carías Andino

19 November 1972	Troya	0–0	Universidad	Tegucigalpa
				Stadium: Estadio Tiburcio Carías Andino

New standings:

Pos	Team	Pld	W	D	L	GF	GA	GD	Pts	Qualification
1	Universidad	2	1	1	0	1	0	+1	3	Final round
2	Troya	2	0	2	0	0	0	0	2	Play-off
3	Olimpia	2	0	1	1	0	1	−1	1	

Updated to match(es) played on 19 November 1972. Source:

=== Group B ===
Pos	Team	Pld	W	D	L	GF	GA	GD	Pts	Qualification
1	Atlético Indio	2	1	1	0	5	1	+4	3	Final round
2	Motagua	2	1	1	0	3	2	+1	3	Play-off
3	Broncos	2	0	0	2	1	6	−5	0	

Updated to match(es) played on 1972. Source:

=== Group C ===
Pos	Team	Pld	W	D	L	GF	GA	GD	Pts	Qualification
1	Marathón	3	2	1	0	11	3	+8	5	Final round
2	España	3	2	0	1	6	6	0	4	Final round
3	Platense	3	1	0	2	4	8	−4	2	
4	Vida	3	0	1	2	4	7	−3	1	

Updated to match(es) played on 1972. Source:

=== Playoff ===
23 November 1972	Motagua	2–0	Troya	Tegucigalpa
	Zelaya 60'; Alvarado 87'			Stadium: Estadio Tiburcio Carías Andino

== Final round ==
Also known as Pentagonal.

Pos	Team	Pld	W	D	L	GF	GA	GD	Pts	Qualification
1	España	4	3	1	0	5	2	+3	7	1972 Honduran Cup winners
2	Marathón	4	2	1	1	3	2	+1	5	
3	Atlético Indio	4	2	0	2	5	5	0	4	
4	Motagua	4	1	1	2	2	3	−1	3	
5	Universidad	4	0	1	3	3	6	−3	1	

Updated to match(es) played on 10 December 1972. Source:

26 November 1972 Day 1	España	2–1	Atlético Indio	San Pedro Sula
	Sauceda; Obando		Calderón	Stadium: Estadio General Francisco Morazán

28 November 1972 Day 1	Motagua	0–0	Universidad	Tegucigalpa
				Stadium: Estadio Tiburcio Carías Andino

30 November 1972 Day 2	Marathón	1–0	Atlético Indio	San Pedro Sula
	Plummer			Stadium: Estadio General Francisco Morazán

30 November 1972 Day 2	España	2–1	Universidad	San Pedro Sula
	Arzú; Obando		Medina	Stadium: Estadio General Francisco Morazán

7 December 1972 Day 3	Atlético Indio	2–1	Motagua	Tegucigalpa
	Aceituno; Calderón		Quiroz	Stadium: Estadio Tiburcio Carías Andino

7 December 1972 Day 3	Marathón	0–0	España	San Pedro Sula
				Stadium: Estadio General Francisco Morazán

9 December 1972 Day 4	España	1–0	Motagua	San Pedro Sula
	Hidalgo			Stadium: Estadio General Francisco Morazán

9 December 1972 Day 4	Marathón	2–1	Universidad	San Pedro Sula
	Greenech; Plummer		Medina	Stadium: Estadio General Francisco Morazán

10 December 1972 Day 5	Universidad	1–2	Atlético Indio	San Pedro Sula
	Corea		López; Nolasco	Stadium: Estadio General Francisco Morazán

10 December 1972 Day 5	Marathón	0–1	Motagua	San Pedro Sula
			Zelaya	Stadium: Estadio General Francisco Morazán

1972 Honduran Cup winners

España
1st title
