= Héctor Medina (footballer) =

Honduran football player (born 1975)

Hector Medina
Personal information
- Full name: Héctor Orlando Medina Díaz
- Date of birth: January 27, 1975 (age 51)
- Place of birth: Trujillo, Honduras
- Position: Goalkeeper

Senior career*
Years	Team	Apps	(Gls)
1998–1999	Olimpia		
2001–2003	Universidad		
2003–2005	Real España		
2005–2008	Vida		
2008	Unión Ájax		
2009–2010	Real Juventud		

International career^{‡}
1998–2006	Honduras	14	(0)
- * Club domestic league appearances and goals as of 2007 ‡ National team caps and goals as of 2001

Héctor Orlando Medina Díaz (born January 27, 1975) is a retired Honduran football goalkeeper.

== Club career ==
Nicknamed 'La Figura', Medina played for Olimpia, Broncos, Universidad, Real España and Vida in the Honduran National League. He was sold along with Camilo Bonilla, Modesto Rodas, Walter Argueta and Jeffrey Brooks from Vida to Honduran Second Division outfit Unión Ájax due to a financial crisis in Vida. He then had another two seasons at Real Juventud.

== International career ==
Medina made his debut for Honduras in a November 1998 friendly match against Guatemala and has earned a total of 14 caps, scoring no goals. He has represented his country in 2 FIFA World Cup qualification matches.

His final international was a February 2006 friendly match against China.

== Retirement ==
In October 2010 he became goalkeeper coach at the Honduras U-17 national team. In July 2011 Medina was announced as goalkeeper coach at Atlético Choloma but was dismissed in February 2013.
