= Deportes Concepción =

Deportes Concepción may refer to:

- Deportes Concepción (Chile)
- Deportes Concepción (Honduras)
