= Guaimaca F.C. =

Honduran football club

Guaimaca FC
- Full name: Guaimaca Fútbol Club
- League: Liga de Ascenso
Home colours	Away colours

Guaimaca Fútbol Club is a Honduran football club based in Guaimaca, Honduras.
