= San Jerónimo, Comayagua =

San Jerónimo
- Municipality
- Location within Honduras
- Coordinates: 14°38′N 87°36′W
- Country: Honduras
- Department: Comayagua

Area
  - Total: 227 km^{2} (88 sq mi)

Population (2015)
  - Total: 21,688
  - Density: 95.5/km^{2} (247/sq mi)

San Jerónimo is a municipality in the Honduran department of Comayagua.
