= Pespire =

- Municipality
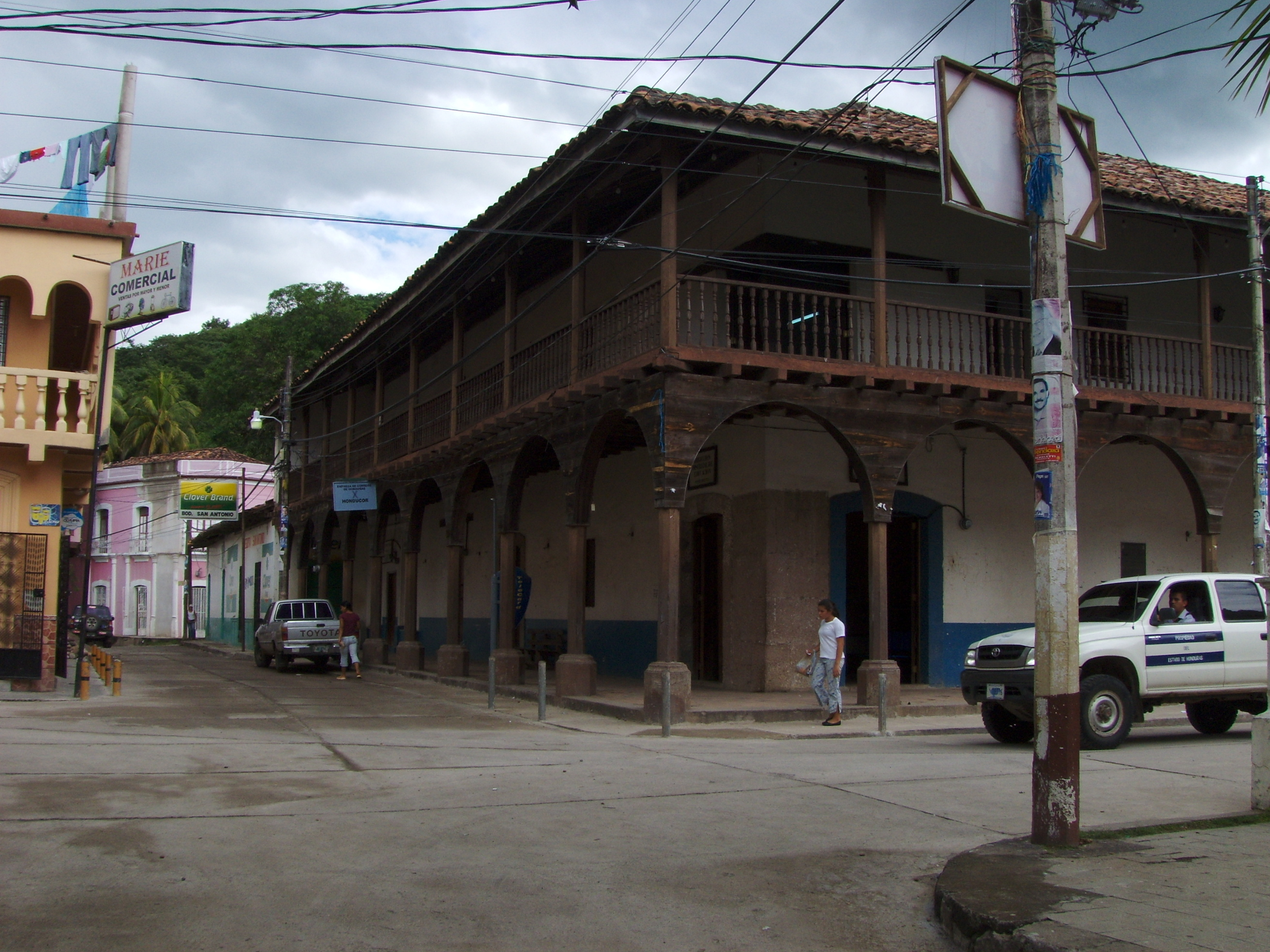
- Municipal Office

- Location in Honduras
- Coordinates: 13°36′N 87°22′W
- Country: Honduras
- Department: Choluteca

Pespire is a municipality in the Honduran department of Choluteca.

It was founded on April 11, 1640 by Indigenous inhabitants and was part of the Nacaome district until 1879, when it was annexed to Choluteca. On February 18, 1929, it was granted city status. Its name means “river of small pyrites,” referring to a bright yellow iron mineral.
