= José Carlos Castillo =

Guatemalan footballer

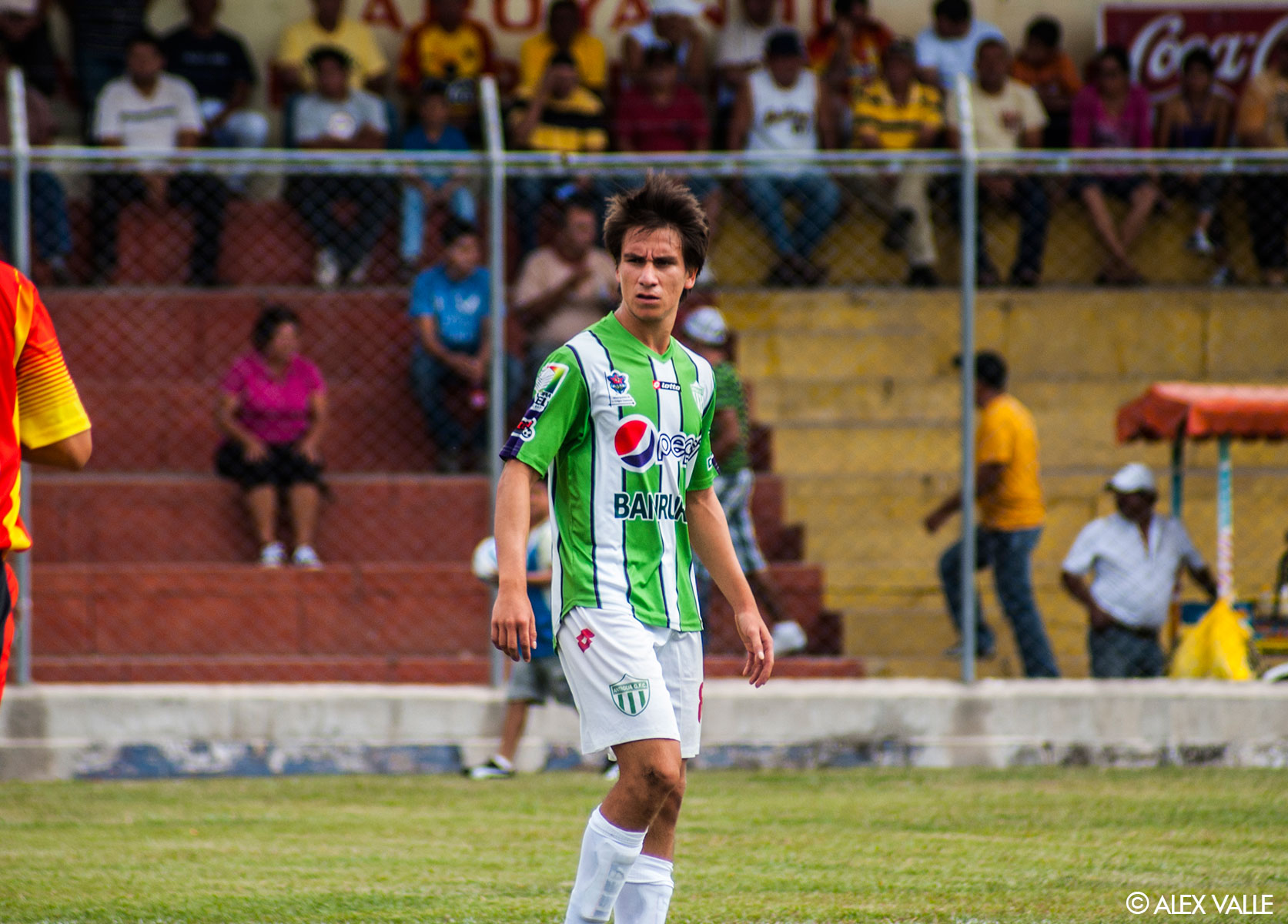
- José Carlos Castillo playing with Antigua GFC, 2013-2014 season.

Personal information
- Full name: José Carlos Castillo
- Date of birth: 18 February 1992 (age 34)
- Place of birth: Guatemala
- Position: Midfielder

Team information
- Current team: Universidad de San Carlos

Youth career
- Centro Escolar El Roble
- 2010–2011: VCU Rams

Senior career*
Years	Team	Apps	(Gls)
2009–2010	Juventud Saleciana	6	(0)
2012	Chiapas	0	(0)
2013–	Universidad de San Carlos		

International career^{‡}
2007–2008	Guatemala U-17		
2010–2011	Guatemala U-20		
2011–	Guatemala	3	(0)
- * Club domestic league appearances and goals as of 30 July 2012 ‡ National team caps and goals as of 30 July 2012

José Carlos Castillo (born 18 February 1992) is a Guatemalan football forward who plays for Chiapas in the Liga MX.

== Career ==
Castillo started his football career in the Athletics team of the Centro Escolar El Roble. He joined than in the 2009 season to Juventud Saleciana and earned his first senior caps.

Nicknamed "Harry Potter", Castillo played collegiate soccer at Virginia Commonwealth University before joining the Chiapas under-20 side in June 2012.

=== International ===
Castillo has played for Guatemala at various youth levels, appearing for the Guatemala national under-17 football team at the Premundial Sub 17 2008 in Mexico. He played also with the Guatemala national under-20 football team at the 2011 FIFA U-20 World Cup finals in Colombia.
