= Municipal Silca =

Honduran football club

- Nickname(s): Los Benjamines
- Ground: Silca, Honduras
Home colours	Away colours

Municipal Silca is a Honduran football club, based in Silca, Honduras.

== History ==
They were relegated to Liga Mayor for the 2008/2009 season.

== Achievements ==
- Liga de Ascenso

Runners-up (1): 2008–09 A
