= Atlético Infop =

- Full name: Atlético Infop
- Dissolved: 2008
- Ground: Estadio Rubén Deras; Choloma, Honduras
- Capacity: 1,000
- League: Liga Mayor de Honduras
Home colours	Away colours

Atlético Infop was a Honduran football club based in Choloma, Honduras.

== History ==
The club was defeated by Atlético Gualala in the Liga Mayor de Honduras promotion playoff and missed the right to be promoted to Liga de Ascenso de Honduras.

=== Atlético Choloma ===
The club was renamed Atlético Choloma in 2008.
