= FC Concordia (Honduras) =

Honduran football club

- Full name: FC Concordia
- Ground: Stade Jean Louis Vanterpool
- Capacity: 3,000
- League: Liga Nacional de Ascenso de Honduras

Football Club Concordia is a Honduran soccer club based in Olancho.

== History ==
The club has played in the Liga Nacional de Ascenso de Honduras.
