= Marlon Duran =

American soccer player

Personal information
- Full name: Marlon Bryan Duran Lopez
- Date of birth: January 25, 1992 (age 34)
- Place of birth: Duncanville, Texas, U.S.
- Height: 1.62 m (5 ft 4 in)
- Position: Midfielder

Youth career
- 2005–2008: Latino Americana
- 2008–2009: IMG Soccer Academy
- 2009–2010: FC Dallas
- 2010: Dayton Flyers
- 2011–2012: Águila

Senior career*
| Years | Team | Apps | (Gls) |
| 2012–2014 | Águila | 12 | (0) |
| 2014–2015 | Dallas City FC | | |

International career^{‡}
| 2008–2009 | United States U17 | 23 | (4) |
- * Club domestic league appearances and goals as of November 4, 2013 ‡ National team caps and goals as of October 29, 2012

Marlon Bryan Duran Lopez (born January 25, 1992) is an American retired soccer player.

== Career ==
Duran made his professional debut for Aguila on September 25, 2012, coming on as a sub in the 60th minute in a 3–0 loss to Toronto FC in the CONCACAF Champions League.
