= Marcovia =

- Municipality
- Location in Honduras
- Coordinates: 13°17′N 87°19′W
- Country: Honduras
- Department: Choluteca
- Became a Municipality: 1882

Government
  - Mayor: Jose Nahun Calix Alvarez

Area
  - Total: 482 km^{2} (186 sq mi)

Population (2013)
  - Total: 24,646
  - Density: 95/km^{2} (250/sq mi)
- Honduran GeoCode: 0607

Marcovia is a municipality in the Honduran department of Choluteca, on the Gulf of Fonseca.

== History ==
Marcovia was called Pueblo Nuevo until 1882 when it became a municipality and was renamed Marcovia by the president, Marco Aurelio Soto. The majority of the people in Marcovia used to be from El Salvador.

== Demographics ==
According to the 2013 census, 53% of the population works in agriculture. Fifty-five percent use some type of private water system, and 48% uses public electricity to light their houses. Eighty-four percent use firewood for cooking and 13% of houses have at least one car. Eighty percent of Morolica has a basic education level.

Historical Population
| Year | Population | %+ | %+ Yearly |
|---|---|---|---|
| 1887 | 717 | | |
| 1901 | 1,094 | 52.6 | 3.8 |
| 1905 | 958 | -12.4 | -3.1 |
| 1910 | 961 | 0.3 | 0.1 |
| 1916 | 1,019 | 6.0 | 1.0 |
| 1926 | 1,496 | 46.8 | 4.7 |
| 1930 | 1,804 | 20.6 | 5.1 |
| 1935 | 2,217 | 22.9 | 4.6 |
| 1940 | 2,721 | 22.7 | 4.5 |
| 1945 | 3,302 | 21.4 | 4.3 |
| 1950 | 3,598 | 9.0 | 1.8 |
| 1961 | 8,903 | 147.4 | 13.4 |
| 1974 | 16,619 | 86.7 | 6.7 |
| 1988 | 28,153 | 69.4 | 5.0 |
| 2001 | 37,824 | 34.4 | 2.6 |
| 2013 | 45,639 | 20.7 | 1.7 |
| 2018 (est.) | 47,510 | 4.1 | 0.8 |

== Geography ==
Marcovia has 20 Villages (Aldeas) and 140 Hamlets.
