= El Triunfo, Honduras =

El Triunfo
- Municipality
- Location in Honduras
- Coordinates: 13°7′N 87°0′W
- Country: Honduras
- Department: Choluteca

Area
  - Municipality: 307 km^{2} (119 sq mi)

Population (2023 projection)
  - Municipality: 51,124
  - Density: 167/km^{2} (431/sq mi)
  - Urban: 13,248

El Triunfo is a town, with a population of 10,930 (2023 calculation), and a municipality in the Honduran department of Choluteca.

This small town is located close to the Nicaraguan border.
