= Honduran Liga Nacional Reserves =

- Founded: 2005
- Country: Honduras
- Divisions: 1
- Number of clubs: 10
- Level on pyramid: 1
- Relegation to: None
- Current champions: Marathón (2nd)

The Honduran Football Reserve League is the reserve league for the Honduran Liga Nacional. It was developed in 2005 and it is made up of players from 15 to 20 years old. Club Deportivo Olimpia won the first tournament in 2005–06 (Apertura).

== Winners ==
Season	Winner	Runner-up
2005–06 A	Olimpia	Marathón
2005–06 C	Olimpia	Platense
2010–11 A	Vida	Platense
2010–11 C	Olimpia	Motagua
2011–12 A	Real España	Marathón
2011–12 C	Motagua	Olimpia
2012–13 A	Real España	Olimpia
2012–13 C	Olimpia	Motagua
2013–14 A	Motagua	Real España
2013–14 C	Olimpia	Motagua
2014–15 A	Olimpia	Motagua
2014–15 C	Olimpia	Real España
2015–16 A	Marathón	Olimpia
2015–16 C	Olimpia	Marathón
2016–17 A	Motagua	Olimpia
2016–17 C	Vida	Real España
2017–18 A	Juticalpa	Motagua
2017–18 C	Vida	Olimpia
2018–19 A	Vida	Olimpia
2018–19 C	Real España	UPNFM
2019–20 A	Marathón	Real España

== Titles by club ==
Club	Winners	Runners-up	Winning years
Olimpia	8	5	2005–06 A, 2005–06 C, 2010–11 C, 2012–13 C, 2013–14 C, 2014–15 A, 2014–15 C, 2015–16 C
Vida	4	0	2010–11 A, 2016–17 C, 2017–18 C, 2018–19 A
Motagua	3	5	2011–12 C, 2013–14 A, 2016–17 A
Real España	3	3	2011–12 A, 2012–13 A, 2018–19 C
Marathón	2	3	2015–16 A, 2019–20 A
Juticalpa	1	0	2017–18 A
Platense	—	2	—
UPNFM	—	1	—
