= Estadio Aurora =

Football stadium in Honduras

Estadio Aurora is a football stadium in San José de Colinas, Honduras. It is currently used mostly for football matches and is the home stadium of Cruz Azul and Espartano Futbol Club. The stadium holds 2,000 people.

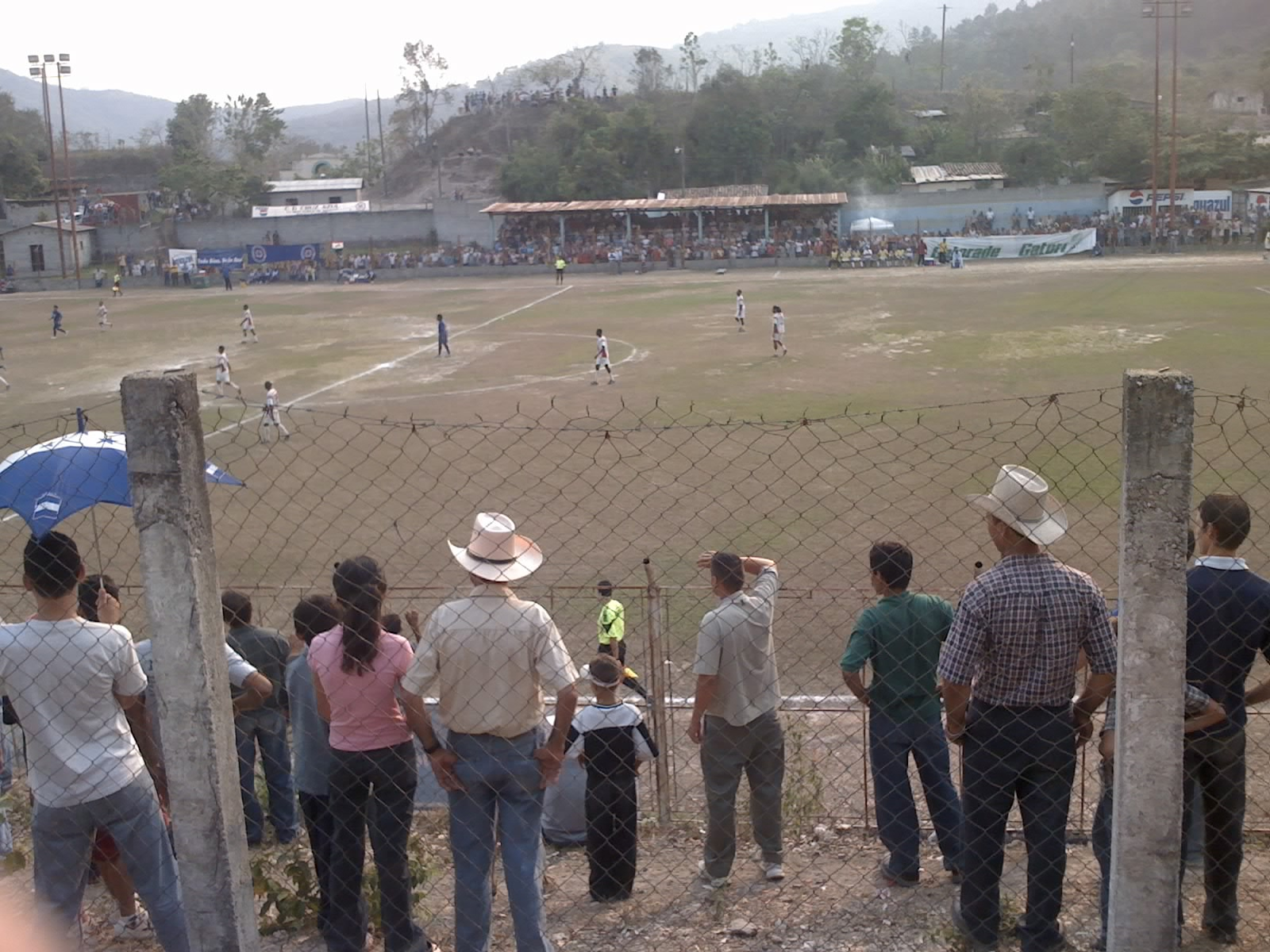
Estadio Aurora's Sombra area from Sol. 06/07 Cl Final Arsenal vs Cruz Azul being played.
