= La Entrada =

- Location in Honduras
- Coordinates: 15°03′40″N 88°45′07″W
- Country: Honduras
- Department: Copán
- Founded: 1731

Government
  - Mayor: Vicente Leon

Population (2001)
  - Total: 14,739
- Time zone: UTC-6

La Entrada is a town in the Honduran department of Copán. It is the capital of the municipality of Nueva Arcadia. The town’s name is Spanish for "The Entrance" as the town is a gateway from coastal Honduras to the mountainous Western highlands.

The Mayan ruins of El Puente are located near La Entrada.

== History ==
The town was founded by hacienda workers in 1731. The town appears in a colonial census from that same year. In 1835, the government of Honduras issued a decree stating that all towns with less than 1,000 inhabitants that do not have municipal common lands would be granted one square Spanish league of land (about two miles), and towns above 1,500 inhabitants would be granted two Spanish leagues of land. These land grants contributed to the early growth of the town.

La Entrada received the title of city by legislative decree on October 1, 1993. The request was made by the acting municipal mayor Eduardo Flores Calderón.

== Sports ==
The local football club, Olimpia Occidental, play in the Honduran second division. They play their home games at the Estadio Alsacias.
