= Talanga =

- Municipality
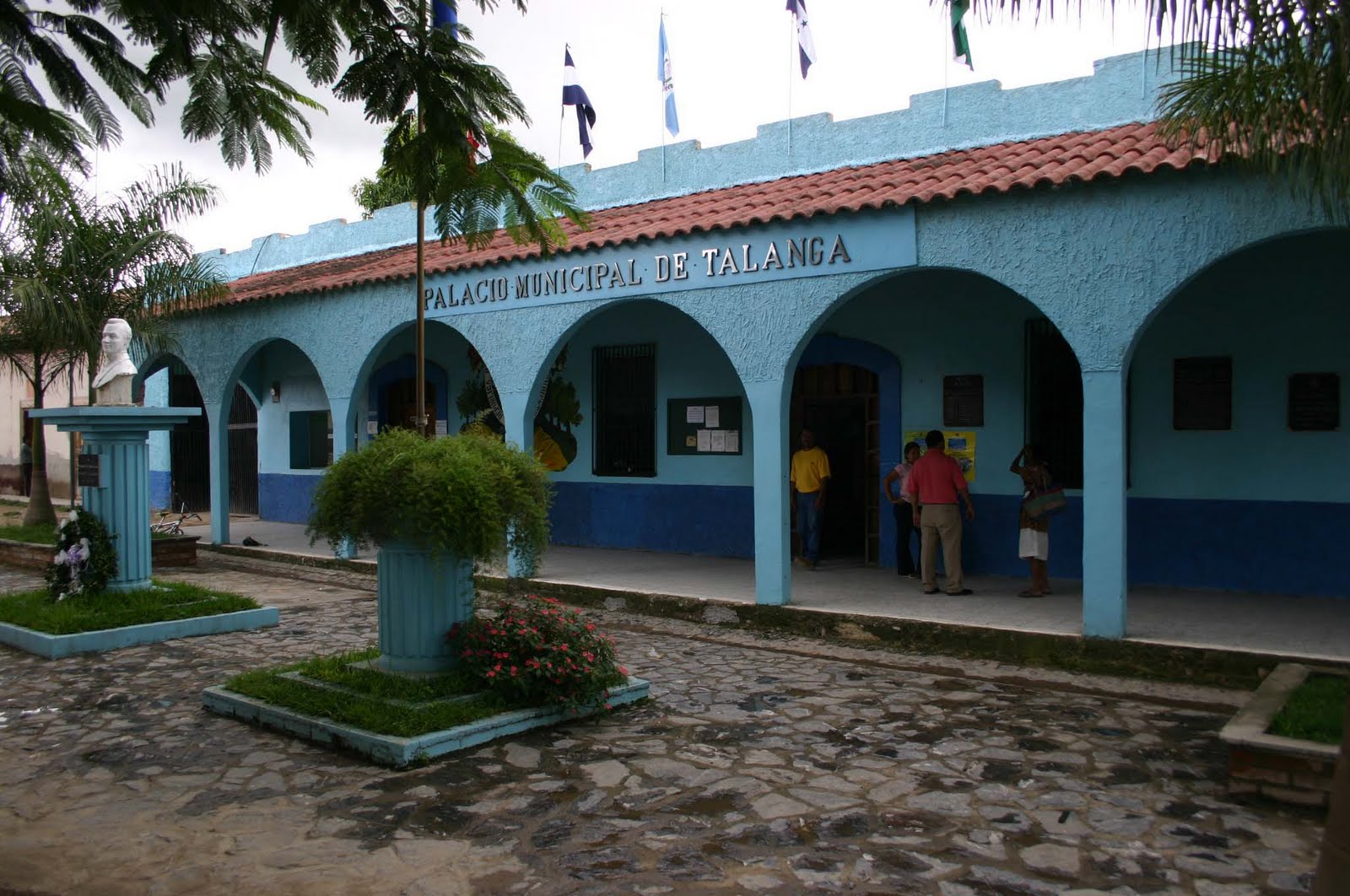
- Talanga municipal palace

- Flag

- Location in Honduras
- Coordinates: 14°24′N 87°5′W
- Country: Honduras
- Department: Francisco Morazán

Government
  - Mayor: Roosevelt Avilez Santos

Area
  - Municipality: 429 km^{2} (166 sq mi)

Population (2023 projection)
  - Municipality: 39,425
  - Density: 91.9/km^{2} (238/sq mi)
  - Urban: 24,792

Talanga is a town, with a population of 20,610 (2023 calculation), and a municipality in the Honduran department of Francisco Morazán.

It lies on the highway connecting Tegucigalpa with the department of Olancho. Talanga is a medium-sized municipality relying heavily on agriculture. Its most important crops include corn, sugar cane and livestock fodder.

Talanga has an indoor market with produce, meat, pots and pans, and other household goods. There are about seven hardware stores, as well as two internet cafes. The town square was built with concrete fixtures and a basketball court. There is a hill with a cross near the town center with a great view of the town and surrounding area.
