= Atlético Gualala F.C. =

Atlético Gualala
- Full name: Atlético Gualala Futbol Club
- Nickname(s): Pateplumas; Gualaleños
- Founded: 2007
- Dissolved: 2009
- Ground: Estadio Municipal de Gualala; Gualala, Honduras
- Capacity: 1,000
- Chairman: José Rolando Sabillón
- League: Liga Nacional de Ascenso de Honduras
Home colours	Away colours

Atlético Gualala was a Honduran football club based in Gualala, Honduras.

== History ==
Founded only in 2007, the club defeated Atlético Infop in the Liga Mayor de Honduras promotion playoff and was promoted to Honduran second division to fill the place of the relegated Deportes Concepción.

The lineup of the team for the promotion match was : Leonardo Sabillón, Carlos Nufio, Hernán Nolasco, Jaime Ortiz, Ever Argueta, Roberto Hernández, Freddy Núñez, Irvin Matute, José Figueroa, German Castillo and Santos Arrivillaga.

=== Promotion to top tier and merge ===
In June 2009, Gualala defeated Necaxa over a two-legged final to clinch promotion to the Liga Nacional de Fútbol Profesional de Honduras. They became the second club, after Sula de La Lima to win back-to-back promotions ending up in the top tier.

However, before the start of the tournament they choose to merge with and sell their license to Real Juventud who had recently relegated the same season, and then decided to stay with the name Real Juventud. In January 2010, Gualala president José Rolando Sabillón claimed Juventud still owed his club money for taking over the top level license.

== Achievements ==
- Liga de Ascenso

Winners (1): 2008–09 A

- Liga Mayor

Winners (1): 2007–08 C
