= Silca =

American cycling parts manufacturer

- Type: Privately held company
- Industry: Cycling
- Founded: 1917; 109 years ago
- Headquarters: Indianapolis, Indiana, United States
- Products: Bicycle pumps; Chain lube; Saddle bags; Tools; 3D Printed Parts; Bottle cages
- Website: silca.cc

Silca is an American cycling parts and accessories manufacturer. Since 2014 Silca has been headquartered in Indianapolis, Indiana and produces a wide range of bicycle related products.

== History ==
The company was founded in 1917 by Felice Sacchi just outside of Milan, Italy. Silca was the first company to put gauges on pumps, the first to create a high pressure frame pump, and more recently the first to have a valve controlled CO_{2} inflator.

In 2021, a new advance was the use of 3D Printing in Titanium.

After nearly 100 years in Milan, Claudio Sacchi, the grandson of Felice Sacchi, decided to sell the company to its current owner Josh Poertner. Josh leaned on his experience as Director of Product Development at Zipp Speed Weaponry to revive the brand.

Since 2014 SILCA has been headquartered in Indianapolis, Indiana and producing a wide range of products. Some of the most popular include bicycle pumps, multi-tool, chain lube, wax, and saddle bags.
