= Universidad Independiente =

- Full name: Universidad Independiente
- Dissolved: 2010
- Ground: Colonia Fesitrahn; San Pedro Sula, Honduras
- Capacity: 1,000

Universidad Independiente was a Honduran soccer club based in San Pedro Sula, Honduras.

== History ==
The club has played in the Honduran second division. In summer 2010, they sold their place in the league to Parrillas One with around 12 Universidad players joining the new team.
