= Guaimaca =

- Municipality
- Location in Honduras
- Coordinates: 14°32′N 86°49′W
- Country: Honduras
- Department: Francisco Morazán

Area
  - Total: 780 km^{2} (300 sq mi)

Population (2023 projection)
  - Total: 32,967
  - Density: 42/km^{2} (110/sq mi)
- Climate: Aw

Guaimaca is a town, with a population of 21,330 (2023 calculation), and a municipality in the Honduran department of Francisco Morazán.

== Business ==
- Agroba, S de R.L. de C.V. coffee grower
