= C.D. Cruz Azul =

Honduran football club

Cruz Azul
- Full name: Club Deportivo Cruz Azul
- Nicknames: Los Cementeros; Los Pateplumas Los recentidos
- Ground: Estadio Aurora; San José de Colinas, Honduras
- Capacity: 2,000
- Chairman: Nicolás Suazo
- Manager: José Urruzmendi
- League: Liga de Ascenso
- 2007–08 Apertura: 3rd
Home colours	Away colours

Cruz Azul is a Honduran football club based in San José de Colinas, Honduras. The club currently plays in the second flight of Honduran football, the Liga de Ascenso. The club's logo and name are copies of the Mexican team CF Cruz Azul, which plays in the top flight of Mexican club football, the Liga MX.

== Achievements ==
- Liga de Ascenso

Runners-up (1): 2006–07 C

== Current squad ==
Note: Flags indicate national team as defined under FIFA eligibility rules; some limited exceptions apply. Players may hold more than one non-FIFA nationality.

No.	Pos.	Nation	Player
—		HON	José Valle
—		HON	Gerson Baca
—		HON	Carlos Montoya
—		PER	Diego Vilca
—		HON	Victor Gracia
