= Estadio Jorge Leonidas García =

Football stadium in Trujillo, Honduras

Coordinates: 15.922898°N 85.936384°W

Estadio Jorge Leonidas García is a football stadium in Trujillo, Honduras. It is used mostly for football matches and is the home stadium of Unión Ájax. The stadium holds 4,000 people.
