= C.D. Social Sol =

Honduran football club

- Full name: Club Deportivo Social Sol
- Nickname(s): Los Comejamos
- Founded: 13 April 1968; 57 years ago
- Ground: Estadio San Jorge, Olanchito, Honduras
- Capacity: 3,000
- Chairman: Ing. Mario Velásquez
- Manager: Miguel Ortíz
- League: Liga de Ascenso de Honduras
- 2015–16: Champions
Home colours	Away colours

Club Deportivo Social Sol is a Honduran football team based in Olanchito, Yoro.

The club was promoted to the Honduran Liga Nacional for the first time in 2016 and competed in the 2016–17 season.

== History ==
Social Sol was founded on 13 April 1968. After spending almost 50 years looking for promotion to the top-tier division, they finally earned its right in the 2015–16 season as winners of the Honduran Liga de Ascenso. In their Liga Nacional debut they faced Club Deportivo Olimpia in Tegucigalpa resulting in a 3–2 loss; meanwhile, their first victory occurred on 29 October 2016 when they defeated C.D. Motagua 3–2 at Estadio San Jorge.

== Performance by year ==
Regular season			Postseason		Others		
Season	Finish	Record	Finish	Record	Cup	Supercup	International
2016–17 A	10th	2–3–13 (12:29)	Did not enter		Round of 16	Did not enter	Did not enter
2016–17 C	8th	2–9–7 (17:27)	Did not enter		Round of 16	Did not enter	Did not enter

== Achievements ==
- Liga de Ascenso

Winners (1): 2015–16 A
Runners-up (3): 2004–05 A, 2007–08 C, 2008–09 C

== Notable managers ==
- (Honduras) Carlos Orlando Caballero (2009)
