= Coxen Hole Stadium =

Football stadium in Roatan, Honduras

Coordinates: 16.318°N 86.541°W

Coxen Hole Stadium also known as Estadio Julio Galindo is a football stadium in Coxen Hole, Roatan, Honduras. It is currently used mostly for football matches, and is the home stadium of Arsenal F.C. (Honduras). The stadium has a maximum capacity of 2,000 people.
