= C.D. Atlético Junior =

- Full name: Club Deportivo Atlético Junior
- Nickname: Junior
- Founded: 1980
- Ground: El Negrito, Honduras
- League: Liga Mayor de Honduras
Home colours

C.D. Atlético Junior is a Honduran football club based in El Negrito, Honduras.

== History ==
The club was relegated to Liga Mayor de Honduras at the end of the 2006–07 season. They returned to the Honduran second division after purchasing the licence of Lenca in 2008.

== See also ==
- Football in Honduras
