= Real España Las Vegas =

Honduran football club

Real España Reservas Real España "B"
- Full name: Club Deportivo; Real España Reservas
- Nickname(s): La Maquinita
- Ground: Estadio Francisco Morazán; San Pedro Sula, Honduras
- Capacity: 20,000
Home colours	Away colours

Real España Las Vegas is a Honduran soccer club, based in San Pedro Sula, Honduras.

They are Real España's reserve or "B" team. They have played in the Honduran 2nd division until 2008/2009.
