= Estadio General Francisco Morazán =

Stadium in San Pedro Sula, Honduras

- "El Morazán"
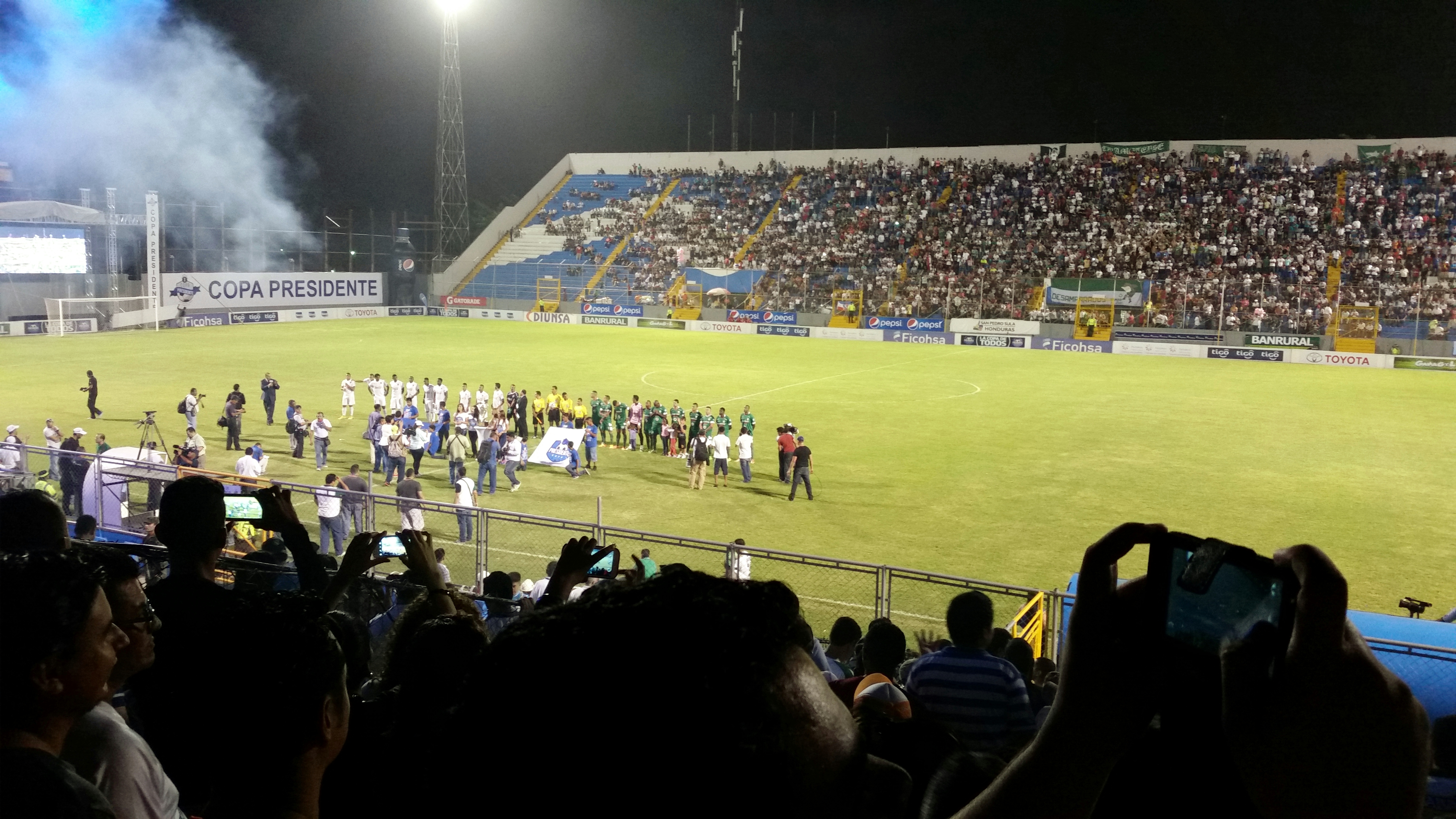
- Interactive map of Estadio General Francisco Morazán
- Former names: Estadio Morazán
- Location: Boulevard Morazán, San Pedro Sula; Honduras
- Coordinates: 15°30′27″N 88°02′00″W
- Owner: CONDEPOR
- Operator: Real España
- Capacity: 18,000
- Surface: GrassMaster
- Record attendance: 22,000

Construction
- Groundbreaking: 1938
- Opened: 1 January 1938; 88 years ago
- General contractor: Municipalidad de San Pedro Sula

Tenants
- Real España; Marathon (selected matches); Honduras national football team (selected matches)

The Francisco Morazán Stadium is one of the three stadiums available to the city of San Pedro Sula, Honduras. It is an official stadium for games of the National League of Professional Football in Honduras and international matches and international competitions of the Confederation of North, Central America, and Caribbean Association Football (CONCACAF) and FIFA.

It is the official stadium of Real España and occasionally C.D. Marathón. It is also used for other activities, including concerts, religious services, and parades. It has a capacity of 18,000 according to FIFA restrictions, but 21,500 according to the Football Federation of Honduras.

The Francisco Morazán Stadium has hosted major sporting events Including tournaments and World Cup qualifying matches for the senior Honduran teams. Also, qualifying championships for the Under-17, Under-20, and Olympic categories belonging to the CONCACAF area.

== Location ==
The General Francisco Morazán Stadium is located between the 12 and 14 Avenue of the modern city of San Pedro Sula in Honduras. The stands called 'Sol Sur' is located back to the Boulevard Morazán. And the part that does not have any stands borders the Third Street. San Pedro Sula's also home to two more stadiums (Olimpico Metropolitano and Yankel Rosenthal). This city is considered or called the industrial capital of Honduras for its commercial importance and its considerable number of inhabitants. So it is undoubtedly the second largest city of the Republic of Honduras.

The stadium is in a central location within the city of San Pedro Sula, very close to hotels, restaurants and sports training facilities in the city. Also, the Francisco Morazán stadium is very close to access roads linking the city of San Pedro Sula, with the capital Tegucigalpa and Puerto Cortes, the country's largest port. The international airport of the city, Ramon Villeda Morales is about 15 minutes from the stadium Francisco Morazán and the bus terminal that connects San Pedro Sula with the rest of the country is about 5 minutes away from the stadium.

== History ==
=== Beginnings ===
According to some local historians, the stadium General Francisco Morazán was built little by little since 1938. Benedicto Muñoz one of the administrators of the stadium in 2013, said to a sport news channel from San Pedro Sula. That it was around that time (1938), when teams of the neighborhood and surrounding communities began to carry out their sporting events, right where the stadium is now located.

According to Muñoz, the Morazán was then a "Municipal Sports Park." While other locals support Muñoz's claim, and have repeatedly said, that this was initially a park with basketball, baseball, tennis and football courts. And that the people who played at this Park, were the same people who petitioned to the municipality of San Pedro Sula for the construction of a stadium. Later, and with the help of some sponsors, the construction of the stadium began.

In regards to the name of the stadium (Francisco Morazán) is because this facility is located near the Boulevard Morazán. According to some inhabitants of the city; from the year of 1940, patriotic parades of the city of San Pedro Sula began in Central Park and always ended in the Morazán Boulevard where the colleges and schools, such as the José Trinidad Reyes and the José Cecilio del Valle among many others, crowned the statue of the General Francisco Morazán. Since then, the stadium began to be known as 'Estadio Francisco Morazán'.

=== Destruction and burning of the stadium ===
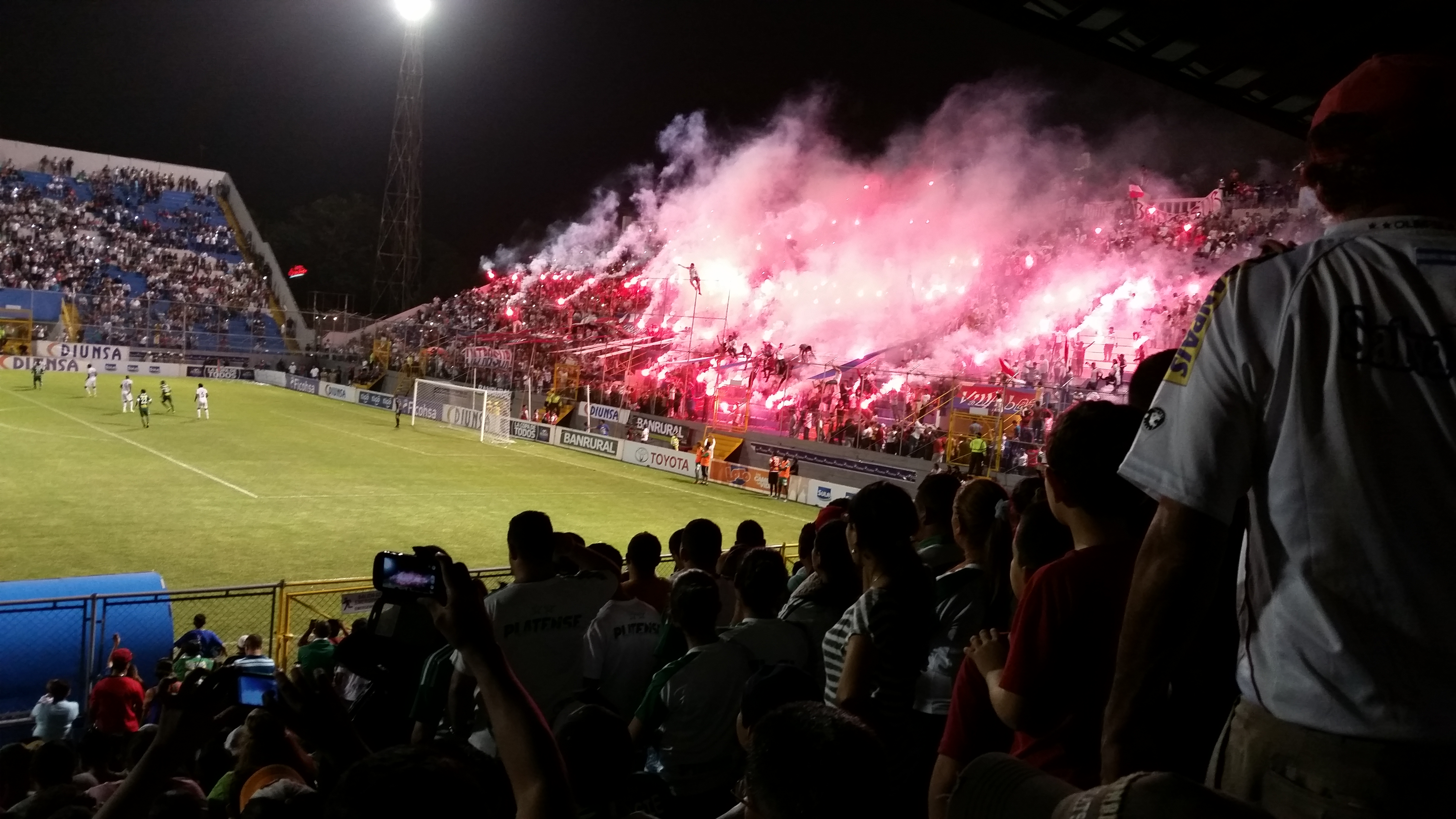

On March 17, 1974, was scheduled the national clasico between CD Olimpia and CD Marathon, valid for the National League Championship. Due to an overbooking of tickets and free passes "The Morazán Stadium" hosted more fans than its capacity. This situation, created a total chaos within the facilities.

To better allocate these fans, the stadium authorities had to place them on the sidelines. When the referees became aware of this situation, they thought it was too risky for the players as well as for the fans, that's why, they decided to cancel the game. The game's suspension resulted in acts of vandalism and violence by infuriated fans. This in turn, ended up with dozens of people injured as well as the destruction and burning of the entire Morazán Stadium.

The next day, some of the Honduran newspapers entitled on their covers "We were left without Stadium!", "with luxury of vandalism and looting" (a day of mourning in the national sport.) While newspaper La Prensa of San Pedro Sula entitled; "Fans destroyed the Morazán Stadium."

== Remodeling ==
Francisco Morazan stadium has been remodeled several times. The first time it was remodeled immediately after its destruction in 1974. At that time, the south stands named 'Sombra sur' were made entirely of wood. But after the burning of the stadium were re-built of concrete. The other stands named 'Preferencia' and 'Silla' were also re-built. The investment was close to 60 thousand lempiras. After a couple of months of re-construction work, the stadium was up and running normally.

In 2008, the Morazan's soccer field was treated in the most troubled areas. Due to many complaints from different coaches, who argued that the turf was too hard, the stadium's authorities proceeded to resurface the Bermuda Type Grass. The company encharged of the field at the time, loaded the soccer field with sand over the hard and yellowish grass areas. In three weeks the stadium soccer field recovered its optimum level said Gabriel Perdomo, administrator of the stadium, in an interview with El Heraldo.

More recently, (in February 2015), the stadium's authorities as well as the National Autonomous Federation of Football of Honduras. Made their best efforts to make this stadium look good, before the start of the 2015 Under 17 Championship of the Confederation of North, Central American and Caribbean Association Football (CONCACAF). This championship, was to decide, the teams who would go to de Junior World Cup in Chile (2015).

The Morazán Stadium's board, hired a company to remove the old coat of paint. For the purpose of applying new paint, similar to Estadio Olímpico Metropolitano, with the colors of the national flag (white and blue) at explicit request of Honduras national team coach, Jorge Luis Pinto. Furthermore, the five dressing rooms were remodeled. Air conditioning, fans, lockers, and new showers were installed.

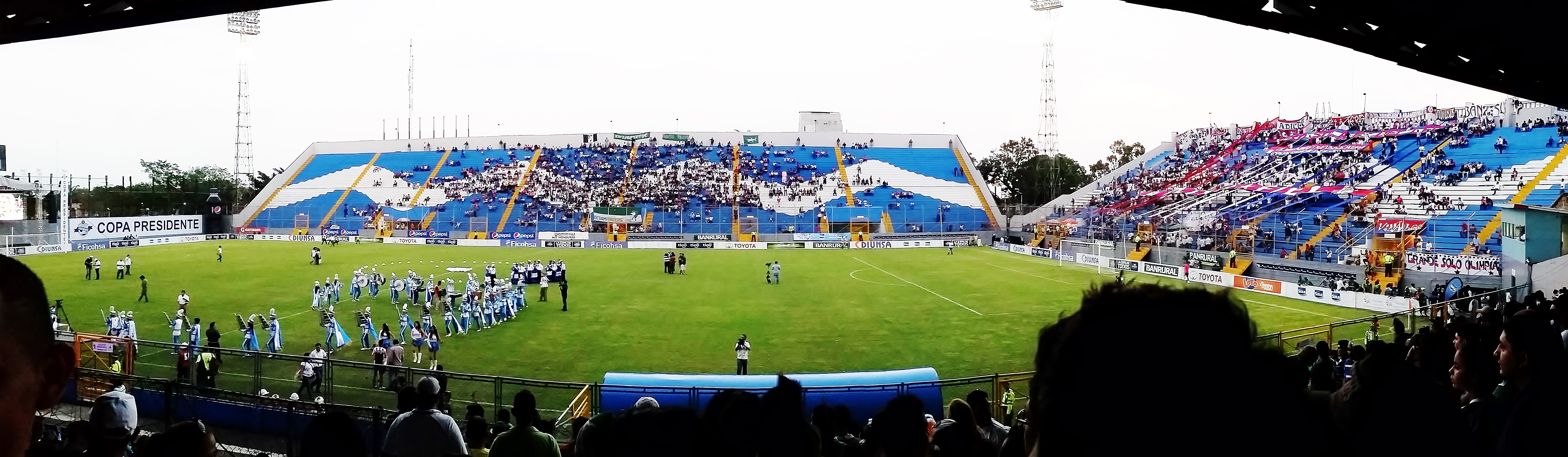
A panoramic view of Estadio Francisco Morazán during Copa Presidente 2015

From 2023 to 2024, the stadium was once again remodeled by CONDEPOR, the same company that remodeled Estadio Nacional Chelato Uclés. The stadium was painted with grey, with the 5 Central American stars and a H painted in cyan. The dressing rooms were remodeled once again, and most importantly, the grass was replaced with hybrid grass.

== International tournaments ==
=== Under 20 ===
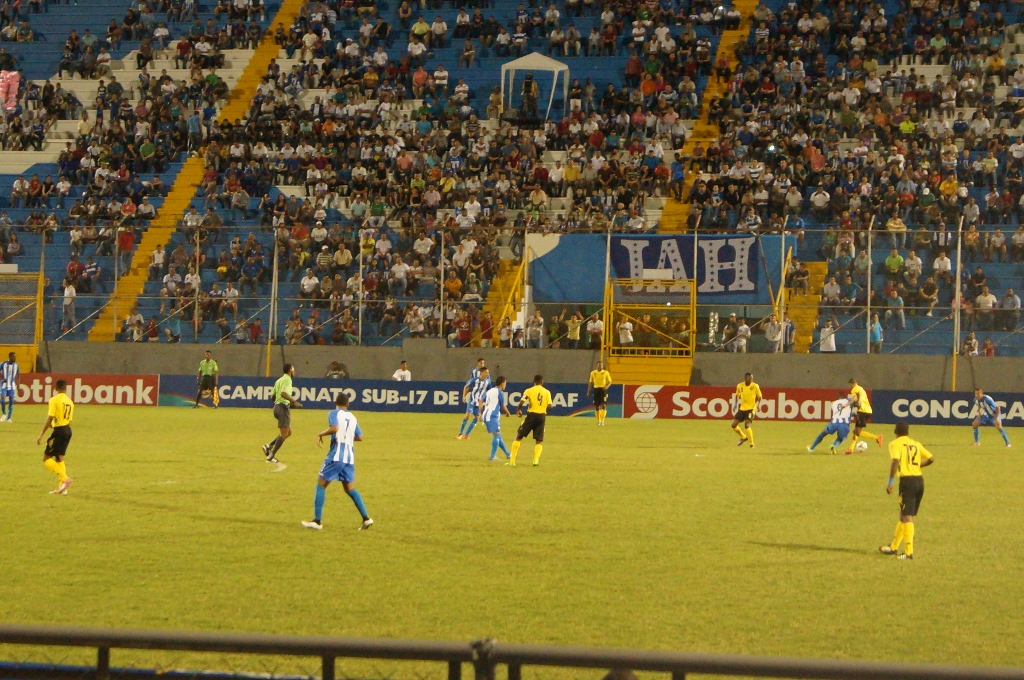
Youth World Cup qualifying game at estadio Morazan in 2015

Through its history, the Francisco Morazan Stadium has hosted several major sporting events. Here were held World Cup qualifying games for the senior Honduras national team as well as Under 17, and Under 20 CONCACAF youth championships. For example, in 1978 CONCACAF awarded Honduras the Under 20 youth tournament for the purpose of qualifying the area's two teams to the world cup to be held in Japan in 1979. This tournament took place from November 26 to December 7, 1978. In two stadiums; the Stadium Tiburcio Carias Andino in Tegucigalpa and the stadium Francisco Morazan. The tournament qualified, Canada and Mexico to the world cup.

In 1994, the executive committee of CONCACAF granted Honduras the rights of hosting another youth tournament. This time it was for the purpose of qualifying teams to the world cup in Qatar in 1995. This championship was held in three cities, Tegucigalpa (National Stadium), Puerto Cortes (Excelsior Stadium) and San Pedro Sula (Stadium Morazán), from August 17 to August 28. Honduras and Costa Rica resulted the winners.

In 2004, San Pedro Sula and estadio Francisco Morazan hosted another under 20 championship. This time, the tournament had a short schedule. Only four teams participated (Honduras, Mexico, Canada and Jamaica). The tournament was held from January 26 to January 30, 2004; and it culminated with Honduras and Canada going to the 2005 World Cup in the Netherlands.

=== Under 17 ===
In July 2014 The Confederation of North, Central American and Caribbean Association Football, granted San Pedro Sula the rights to organize the qualifying tournament for the Chile 2015 World Cup for teams Under 17.

The tournament was held from February 27 to March 14, 2015. Honduras played all of its games against Cuba, Jamaica, and the United States at estadio Morazan. While Costa Rica, Canada, Mexico and Trinidad and Tobago went to the Olimpico Metropolitano stadium of the same city of San Pedro Sula.

In the end, the tournament was a total success. Honduras, Mexico, United States and Costa Rica qualified for the world cup. The final game between Mexico and Honduras that was initially scheduled for the estadio Olimpico was moved to Estadio Morazan, where the Mexican team was crowned the tournament's champion.

=== Men’s senior national football team ===
In modern times, the Francisco Morazan Stadium has also hosted qualifying games for the senior national soccer team. In 1996, the Honduras national football team played games against Jamaica (0-0), Saint Vincent (11-3), and the historic win (2-1) against Mexico on September 21, 1996. These games were qualifiers for the World Cup to be held later in France in 1998.

Honduras U-17 also played a qualifying game here, valid for the World Cup 2002, to later be held in Japan and Korea. Honduras played against Haiti on June 6, 2000. This match represented an important victory for Honduras (4-0). All of these qualifying games, were conducted without any incident and produced this stadium's record crowds of more than 20,000 fans.

On November 15, 2024, after almost 7 years of not playing there, the men’s senior team returned to Estadio Francisco Morazán to play the first leg of the Concacaf Nations League quarterfinals against Mexico. The reason why Estadio Morazan was chosen instead of the de facto home stadium Estadio Nacional Chelato Uclés was due to Estadio Morazan being the venue for Honduras’ first ever victory against Mexico.

=== U-20 women's tournament ===
On May 6, 2015, The Confederation of North, Central American and Caribbean Association Football Asociació announced that Honduras will host the Women's Under-20 CONCACAF Championship, scheduled for December. "San Pedro Sula will host the tournament to be held from 3 to 13 December. The tournament will crown the Confederation's champion and qualify three teams to the World Cup Women's Under-20 World Cup to be played in New Guinea in 2016.

"We are happy to return to Honduras for the U-20 Championships Women's Championship, the second CONCACAF tournament to be held in Honduras this year," said the former CONCACAF President Jeffrey Webb. "The efforts of the Honduran Federation for having championships in San Pedro Sula demonstrates the growth of women's football in Central America." The Championship will feature the participation of eight teams, three from the Caribbean Football Union (CFU), two Central American Football Union (UNCAF) and three in North America.

"In North America, are already automatically qualified nations of Canada, United States and Mexico, while sorting processes in CFU and UNCAF will be made in the coming months. As host country, Honduras is automatically classified as one of two representatives of UNCAF.

== Concerts ==
Many concerts have been hosted in the Estadio Francisco Morazán. Artists performing there include:

- Alejandro Fernández
- Yuri
- Sean Paul
- Shakira
- Vicente Fernández
- Daddy Yankee
- Marco Antonio Solís
- Vilma Palma e Vampiros
- Paulina Rubio
- Los Tigres del Norte
- Wisin & Yandel
- Aventura
- Hector "El Father"

== See also ==
- List of football stadiums in Honduras
- Lists of stadiums
