= F.C. Motagua Reserves =

Honduran football club

Motagua Reserves
- Full name: Fútbol Club Motagua Reservas
- Nickname: Las Aguilitas Motaguitas
- Founded: 2010
- Ground: Estadio Tiburcio Carías Andino; Tegucigalpa, Honduras
- Capacity: 35,000
- Chairman: Julio Gutiérrez
- Manager: Javier Núñez
- League: Liga Nacional Reserves
Home colours	Away colours

Fútbol Club Motagua Reservas is a Honduran football team based in Tegucigalpa, Honduras.

Founded in 2010, it is the reserve team of F.C. Motagua and currently plays in the Honduran Liga Nacional Reserves.

== History ==
For the 2010–11 season the team was disaffiliated from the Liga Nacional de Ascenso as they didn't register to compete, this because they joined the new reserves league.

== Honours ==
=== Domestic competitions ===
- Reserves League

Winners (3): 2011–12 C, 2013–14 A, 2016–17 A
Runners-up (5): 2010–11 C, 2012–13 C, 2013–14 C, 2014–15 A, 2017–18 A
