= Deportes Concepción (Honduras) =

Honduran football club

- Full name: Deportes Concepción
- League: Liga Mayor de Honduras
- 2006–07 Clausura: 7th (Relegated)
Home colours	Away colours

Deportes Concepción is a Honduran football club based on San Marcos, Honduras.

== History ==
The club was relegated to Liga Mayor de Honduras at the end of the 2006–07 season. Back in the second division, they were removed from the competition after failing to show up for two games in the 2009 Apertura.
