= Municipal Paceño =

Honduran football club

Paceño
- Full name: Municipal Paceño
- Ground: Estadio Roberto Suazo Cordoba; La Paz, Honduras
- Capacity: 8,000
- League: Liga Mayor
Home colours	Away colours

Municipal Paceño is a Honduran football club based in La Paz, Honduras.

== History ==
The club has played in Liga Nacional de Ascenso de Honduras, but were denied accumulating points in the 2013 Clausura because of outstanding debts. They played off with Valencia to stay up, but were in the end relegated after losing 3–5.
