= Estadio Roberto Suazo Córdova =

Stadium in La Paz, Honduras

- Interactive map of Estadio Roberto Suazo Córdova
- Full name: Estadio Roberto Suazo Córdova
- Former names: Estadio Municipal Modesto Rodas
- Location: La Paz, Honduras
- Coordinates: 14.321306°N 87.670770°W
- Owner: La Paz Municipality
- Capacity: 25,000
- Surface: Artificial Grass
- Field size: 105 x 68

Construction
- Built: 1985
- Opened: 1986

Tenant
- Municipal Paceño

Estadio Roberto Suazo Córdova is a multi-use stadium in La Paz, Honduras. It is currently used mostly for football matches and is the home of Municipal Paceño F.C. Has the capacity for 25,000 people. Its considered as one of the biggest stadiums in Honduras.

== Restoration ==
The stadium remained neglected for several years until in 2021 the restoration of it began. A synthetic grass field and a running track were installed, in addition to improving other aspects of it, such as reinforcing the infrastructure.
