= Estadio Argelio Sabillón =

Multi-purpose stadium in Santa Bárbara, Honduras

Coordinates: 14°55′34″N 88°14′46″W

- Interactive map of Estadio Argelio Sabillón
- Full name: Estadio Argelio Sabillón
- Location: Santa Bárbara, Honduras
- Capacity: 5,000 people
- Surface: Grass

Tenants
- Subirana; San Juan

Estadio Argelio Sabillón is a multi-purpose stadium in Santa Bárbara, Honduras. It is currently used mostly for football matches and is the home stadium of Real Juventud. The stadium holds 5,000 people.

The stadium is named after famous Honduran referee Argelio Sabillón, who resides in the area.

The stadium's pitch deteriorated during the break in 2020 but was quickly repaired by authorities.
