= C.D. Necaxa =

Honduran football club

Necaxa
- Full name: Club Deportivo Necaxa De Honduras
- Nickname(s): Rayos
- Founded: 3 July 1954; 70 years ago
- Dissolved: 2012
- Ground: Estadio Fausto Flores Lagos; Choluteca, Honduras
- Capacity: 5,000
- Chairman: Juan Ramón Laínez
- League: Liga Nacional
- 2010–11 C: 6th
Home colours	Away colours

C.D. Necaxa was a Honduran football club based in Tegucigalpa, Honduras.

== History ==
Necaxa were founded in 1954 by Wilfredo Guerra, the Mexican ambassador to Honduras at the time.

=== Promotion ===
On 23 May 2010 Necaxa obtained the promotion to the Honduran Liga Nacional for the first time in their history, after beating Atlético Independiente in Tegucigalpa 2–0.

They were dissolved in 2012 by selling their category to Platense.

== Achievements ==
- Liga de Ascenso
  - Winners (3): 2008–09 C, 2009–10 A, 2009–10 C

== Stadium ==
The team played its home games during its stay in top-flight at Estadio Fausto Flores Lagos, which has a capacity for 5,000.

== League performance ==
- Data since 2010–11

Regular season											Postseason								
Season	Pos.	Pld	W	D	L	F	A	GD	Pts	PD	Pos.	Pld	W	D	L	F	A	GD	Pts
2010–11 A	9th	18	5	4	9	18	19	−1	19	—	Didn't enter								
2010–11 C	6th	18	5	9	4	25	24	+1	24	—	Didn't enter								
2011–12 A	6th	18	6	5	7	16	20	−4	23	—	6th	2	0	1	1	1	2	−1	1
2011–12 C	8th	18	4	4	10	20	25	−5	16	—	Didn't enter								

== Top scorers ==
As April 2014

- (Honduras) Ruben Licona (15) goals
- (Honduras) Nery Medina (9) goals
- (Belize) Harrison Rochez (8) goals
- (Honduras) Oscar Duron (6) goals
- (Colombia) Charles Cordoba (5) goals
- (Honduras) Ruben Matamoros (4) goals
- (Honduras) Luis Rodas (4) goals
- (Honduras) Jesus Navas (4) goals
- (Honduras) Shannon Welcome (4) goals

== Former managers ==
- (Brazil) Denilson Costa (2011)
- (Honduras) Jorge Pineda (2011–2012)
