= El Negrito =

Municipality of Honduras

- Municipality
- Location in Honduras
- Coordinates: 15°19′N 87°42′W
- Country: Honduras
- Department: Yoro
- Villages: 29

Area
  - Municipality: 565 km^{2} (218 sq mi)

Population (2023 projection)
  - Municipality: 50,550
  - Density: 89.5/km^{2} (232/sq mi)
  - Urban: 20,646
- Time zone: UTC−06:00 (Central America)
- Climate: Aw

El Negrito (Spanish pronunciation: [el neˈɣɾito]) is a town, with an urban population of 13,260 (2023), and a municipality in the department of Yoro, Honduras.

== Villages ==
El Negrito has a total of 29 villages:

- Aldea Paujiles Norte
- Battán
- Campo Perdeíz
- Cerro Prieto No.1
- Cerro Prieto No.2
- El Jocomico
- El Junco
- El Naranjo
- El Negrito
- El Pate
- El Robledal
- El Rodeo
- Estero Indio
- Finca Treinta and Cinco
- Finca Treinta and Seis
- Guangolola 1
- Guangolola 2
- Guaymón No.1
- La Laguna
- La Majada
- La Veinte and Nueve
- La Veinte and Ocho
- Las Delicias
- Nueva San Antonio
- Samar
- San Jerónimo
- San José del Negrito
- Toyos
- Villa del Carmen and Treinta and Siete

== Demographics ==
At the time of the 2013 Honduras census, El Negrito municipality had a population of 45,363. Of these, 95.35% were Mestizo, 3.33% White, 1.03% Indigenous (0.50% Tolupan, 0.19% Lenca, 0.15% Chʼortiʼ, 0.11% Nahua), 0.24% Black or Afro-Honduran and 0.05% others.
