= Estadio San Jorge =

Multi-use stadium in Olanchito, Honduras

Coordinates: 15°28′35″N 86°33′55″W

San Jorge
- Interactive map of San Jorge
- Full name: Estadio San Jorge
- Location: Olanchito, Honduras
- Owner: Olanchito Municipality
- Capacity: 7,000
- Surface: Grass
- Field size: 105 x 68

Tenant
- Social Sol

Estadio San Jorge is a multi-use stadium in Olanchito, Honduras. It is currently used mostly for football matches and is the home stadium of Social Sol. The stadium holds 7,000 people.
