= Arsenal F.C. (Honduras) =

Honduran football club

Arsenal F.C. Roatán
- Full name: Arsenal Football Club de Roatán
- Nicknames: Los Isleños; Los Caracoles
- Founded: 1999
- Ground: Coxen Hole Stadium; Roatán, Honduras
- Capacity: 2,000
- Chairman: Leland Roy Woods Mcnab
- Manager: Ninrrol Medina
- League: Honduran Liga Nacional de Ascenso
Home colours	Away colours

Arsenal Football Club de Roatán is a professional Honduran football team based in Roatán, Honduras.

It currently plays in the second division Honduran Liga Nacional de Ascenso in Zona Norte-Occidente Group A.

== History ==
Only founded in 1999, the team had a chance to be promoted to the top division, Liga Nacional de Honduras, in May 2007 but they lost to Deportes Savio in the promotion play-off. Arsenal F.C. has produced Honduran Internationals such as Georgie Welcome who became the only player to debut with the national side playing in the second tier of Honduras and Edrick Menjívar

== Achievements ==
- Liga de Ascenso

Winners (1): 2006–07 C
Runners-up (2): 2006–07 A, 2007–08 A
