= Unión Ájax =

Honduran football club

- Full name: Unión Ájax
- Ground: Estadio Jorge Leonidas García; Trujillo, Honduras
- Capacity: 4,000
- Chairman: Mario Andrade
- Manager: Dennis Allen
- League: Liga Mayor
Home colours	Away colours

Unión Ájax is a Honduran soccer club based in Trujillo, Honduras.

The club has played in the Honduran second division as recently as in 2011.

== Former managers ==
- (Honduras) Donaldo Cáceres (2008)
