= Estadio Alsacias =

Honduran football stadium

Estadio Alsalsias is a football stadium in La Entrada, Honduras. It is currently used mostly for football matches and is the home stadium of Olimpia Occidental. The stadium holds 2,000 people.
