= C.D. Real Juventud =

Honduran football club

Real Juventud
- Full name: Club Deportivo Real Juventud
- Nickname(s): Pateplumas
- Founded: 30 May 1965; 59 years ago
- Ground: Estadio Argelio Sabillon, Santa Bárbara, Honduras
- Capacity: 5,000
- Chairman: Alvaro Pérez
- Manager: Rubén Guifarro
- League: Liga de Ascenso de Honduras
Home colours	Away colours

Club Deportivo Real Juventud is a Honduran football club based in Santa Bárbara, Santa Bárbara.

The club currently plays in the Honduran second division, after being promoted from the Honduran top tier in summer 2011.

== History ==
Real Juventud was founded in 1966. Since their foundation, Real Juventud used to play in the Fraternidad Junquera league in Santa Barbara. In 1983, the club started playing in Liga Nacional de Ascenso de Honduras after they bought a category in that league. For the rest of their history, they played in Liga de Ascenso de Honduras until 2008 when they earned a promotion to Liga Nacional de Honduras, the highest league in Honduras, by winning both Apertura and Clausura championships after defeating Arsenal FC from Roatán and Social Sol from Olanchito respectively.

Their games for the 2008/2009 Apertura tournament will be televised by Honduran Channel 11. Since playing in Liga de Ascenso de Honduras, Real Juventud has had a working relationship with Marathon. For the upcoming tournament, Marathon has promised to loan out players to Real Juventud that are not part of the plans of their manager Manuel Keosseian.

=== Relegation and merge with Gualala ===
Before the start on the 2009–10 Apertura season, Atlético Gualala achieved promotion to first division on 2008–09, however before the start of the tournament they choose to merge with Real Juventud who had recently relegated the same season, and then decided to stay with the name Real Juventud.

Juventud were relegated in April 2010 after they had 4 points deducted after a group of former players claimed the club still owed them money. This decision by the National Arbitration Tribunal saved Deportes Savio from the drop.

== Achievements ==
- Liga de Ascenso
  - Winners (2): 2007–08 A, 2007–08 C
  - Runners-up (1): 2005–06 C

== League performance ==
Regular season											Post season								
Season	Pos	P	W	D	L	F	A	PTS	+/-	Ded	Pos	P	W	D	L	F	A	PTS	+/-
2008–09 A	9th	18	3	3	12	13	24	12	−11	–	Did not enter								
2008–09 C	7th	18	4	7	7	15	21	19	−6	–	Did not enter								
2009–10 A	10th	18	3	4	11	19	32	13	−13	–	Did not enter								
2009–10 C	8th	18	6	4	8	25	28	19	−3	−3	Did not enter								
