= Olimpia Occidental =

Honduran soccer club

C.D. Olimpia Occidental
- Full name: Club Deportivo Olimpia Occidental
- Nicknames: Albos Copanecos, "Los Leones'
- Ground: Estadio Alsacias, La Entrada, Honduras
- Capacity: 2,000
- Chairman: Carlos Castañeda
- Manager: Gilberto Machado
- League: Liga de Ascenso
Home colours	Away colours

Club Deportivo Olimpia Occidental is a Honduran soccer club based in La Entrada, Honduras.

They play their home games at the Estadio Alsacias.

== History ==
The club currently plays in the Honduran second division, making their debut in the 2011 Clausura. They saved themselves from the drop in summer 2013 after beating Sonaguera FC in a relegation play-off.

== Squad ==
Note: Flags indicate national team as defined under FIFA eligibility rules; some limited exceptions apply. Players may hold more than one non-FIFA nationality.

No.	Pos.	Nation	Player
—		HON	Óscar Ruiz
—		HON	Carlos Pinto
—		BRA	Guita Bagé
—		HON	Randy Diamond
—		HON	Dichktmar Hernández
—		HON	Pompilio Cacho
—		CUB	Gonzalo Más
