= La Jigua =

- Municipality
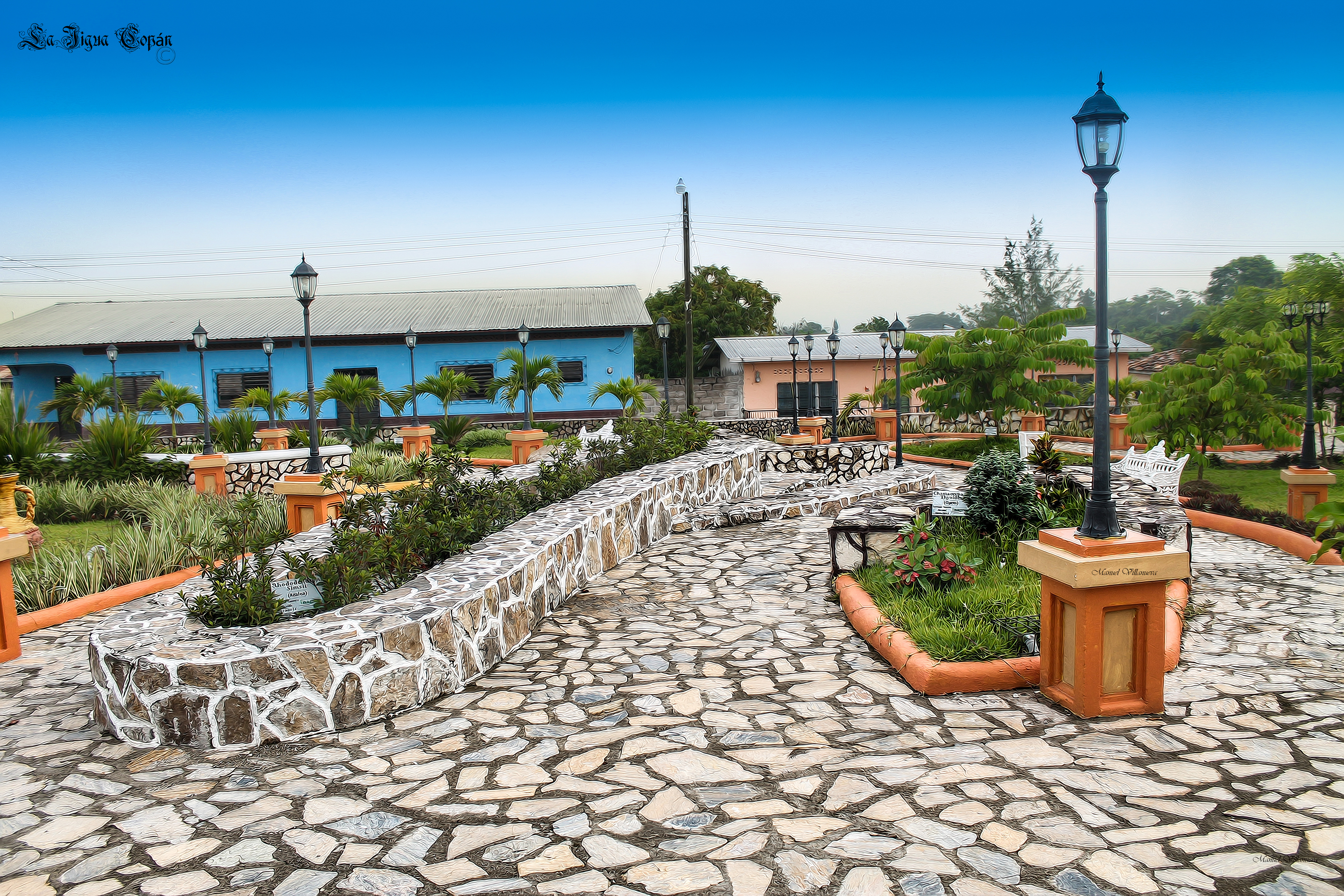

- Location of La Jigua in Honduras
- Coordinates: 15.04°N 88.80°W
- Country: Honduras
- Department: Copán
- Established: 13 July 1965
- Seat: La Jigua

Government
  - Mayor: Germán Guerra Echeverría

Area
  - Total: 114 km^{2} (44 sq mi)

Population (2013 Census)
  - Total: 9,288
  - Density: 81.5/km^{2} (211/sq mi)
- Time zone: UTC-6 (Central America)
- Geocode: 0411
- Website: Transparency Portal page

La Jigua is a municipality in the department of Copán in western Honduras, located approximately 30 kilometres (19 mi) north of the departmental capital, Santa Rosa de Copán. Its name ultimately derives from Nahuatl Xihuacan, "place that has turquoise."

== Geography ==
The municipality of La Jigua straddles the Chamelecón River valley at its point of confluence with the Tepemechín River. It borders the municipalities of Florida to the west and north, Nueva Arcadia to the east, and San Nicolás to the south. The municipality covers an area of 114 square kilometres (44 sq mi).

The terrain is a mixture of pastureland, farmland, and conifer and broadleaf forest.

La Jigua has a temperate climate with average daily temperatures that range from 18 to 30 °C (64 to 86 °F) and an average annual relative humidity of 80%. The wettest months are September and October and the driest months are March and April.

== History ==
The place name Santiago de los Caballeros de Xiguat is attested as early as 1729, while the current name of La Jigua first appears in historical records from 1791. La Jigua was part of the municipality of Florida when it was established in 1875. On 13 July 1965, La Jigua was separated from Florida as an independent municipality.

== Government ==
The current mayor of La Jigua is Germán Guerra Echeverría.

== Demographics ==
In the 2013 Honduran Census, La Jigua recorded a total population of 9288 inhabitants. There are no urban areas in the municipality. The inhabitants are predominantly of Spanish and Chʼortiʼ mestizo descent.

== Culture ==
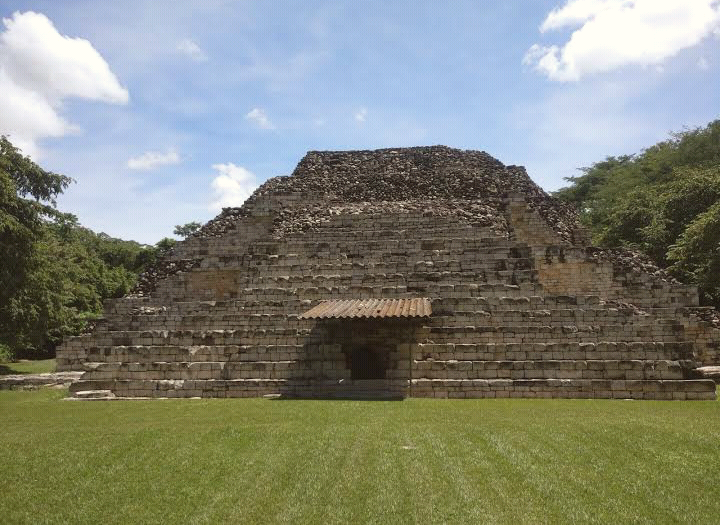
A pyramid at El Puente.

The Mayan archaeological site of El Puente is located in the municipality, on the Chinamito River on the north side of the Chamelecón valley. It was established in January 1994 as the second archaeological park in the country after Copán.

Saint James is the patron saint of the municipality.

== Economy and infrastructure ==
According to the 2013 Census, 69% of the population in La Jigua works in the primary sector. The main crops grown are corn, beans, and coffee. Cattle are the main livestock raised.

Central American Highway 11 runs through the municipality, connecting La Jigua with Copán Ruinas and the Guatemalan border to the west, and the nearby town of La Entrada to the east. Another road runs north from Highway 11, passing by the site of El Puente and connecting to the village of La Ruidosa.
