= San Agustín, Honduras =

San Agustín
- Location in Honduras
- Coordinates: 14°49′N 88°56′W
- Country: Honduras
- Department: Copán

Area
  - Total: 73 km^{2} (28 sq mi)

Population (2015)
  - Total: 5,643
  - Density: 77/km^{2} (200/sq mi)
- Climate: Cwa

San Agustín (Spanish pronunciation: [san aɣusˈtin]) is a municipality in the Honduran department of Copán. It is situated 36.4 kilometres (22.6 mi) by road northwest of Santa Rosa de Copán.

== History ==
In the Territorial Political Division of 1896, San Agustín had the status of a small village (aldea). It was promoted to the status of municipality in 1930, though in 1940 it formed part of Santa Rosa, until it finally became a municipality again in 1957.

== Geography ==
The municipality borders the municipality of Concepción to the north, the municipalities of La Unión and Cucuyagua to the south, the municipality of Santa Rosa de Copán to the east and the municipality of Santa Rita to the west.

The municipality contains four villages: San Agustín (the capital), Cerro Negro, El Descombro, and Granadillal.

== Crafts and landmarks ==
The area is a producer of pottery. The main town contains the church Iglesia Asambleas de Dios Aposento and a small guesthouse, Rancho Anita.
