= Museum of Maya Sculpture =

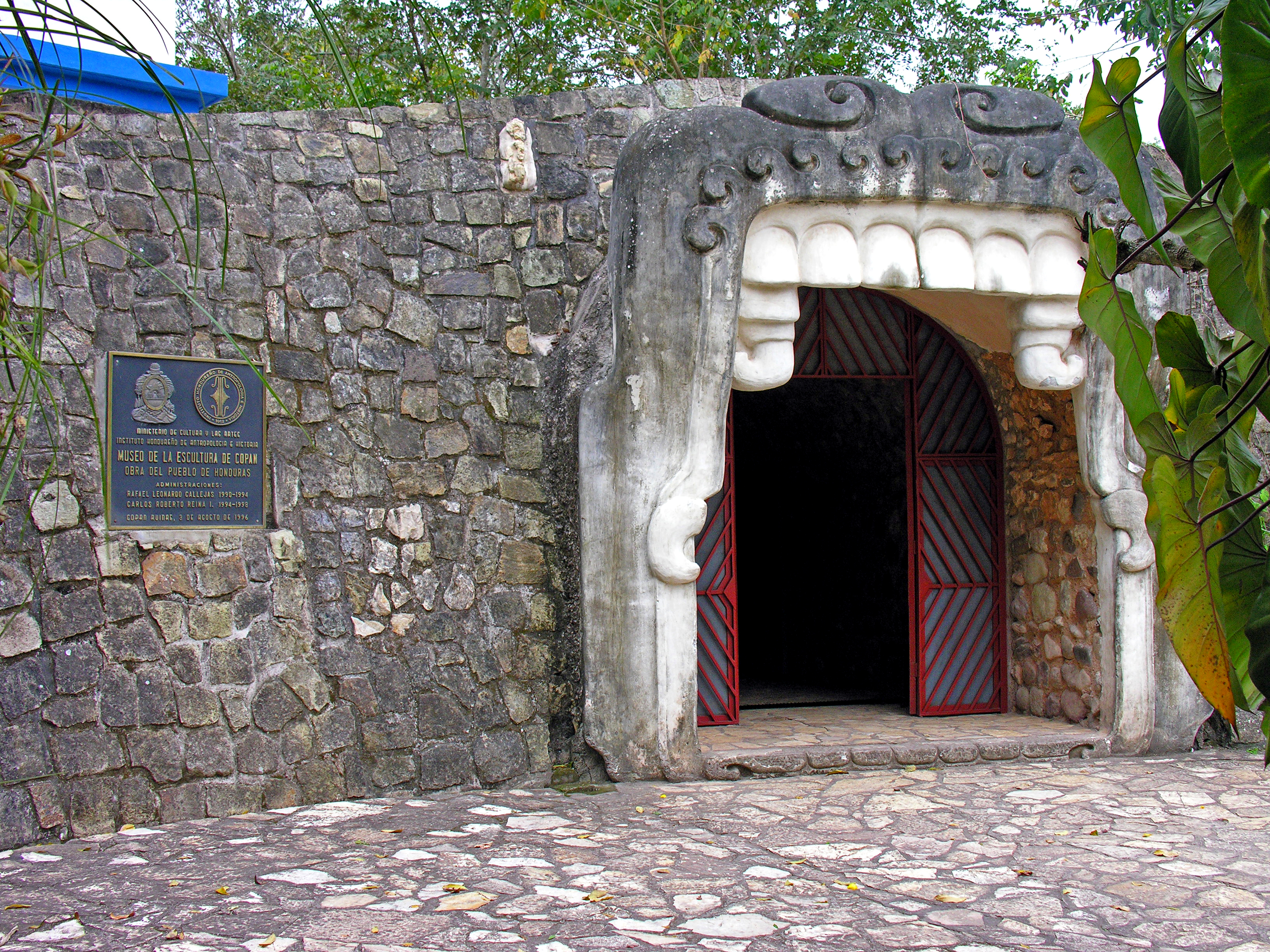
Museum entrance.

The "Museo Escultura" (Sculpture Museum) or "Museo de la Escultura de Copan" (Museum of Sculpture of Copan) or "Museo de la Escultura Maya" (Museum of Maya Sculpture) is a museum dedicated to the Maya culture near the town of Copan Ruinas, very close to the archaeological site of the same name in Honduras. The installations preserve various figures, sculptures, engravings, and original parts of the temples within them.

== History ==
The museum was built in 1993, as part of the tourist attraction of the archaeological site and to preserve many of the sculptures found in and around Copán. The museum wanted to have a considerable size to be able to house the enormous collection of archaeological pieces, in addition to having an open design so that it can have a guaranteed entry of natural light, since when it was built the town did not have many sources of electricity.

When the building was finished, It was designed to house more than 3,000 pieces of sculpture distributed in 59 exhibits; Inside, a series of sculptures that have been rescued from the archaeological site are exhibited. The huge building comprises about 4,000 square meters of construction on two levels (most of them are underground). It was filled with stelae and pieces of sculpture of deities from the Maya pateon such that were found scattered throughout the site.

== Collection ==
Among its exhibits stands out the impressive life-size replica of the Rosalila Temple, also known as the Temple of the Sun, discovered under structure 16 in perfect condition. It also houses the original Altar Q and Stelae A, P and 2. In addition to figures of beings that are part of Maya mythology, such as Chaac or Camazotz, the collection includes original parts of temples reassembled within the museum, as well as calendars and engravings.

== Gallery ==
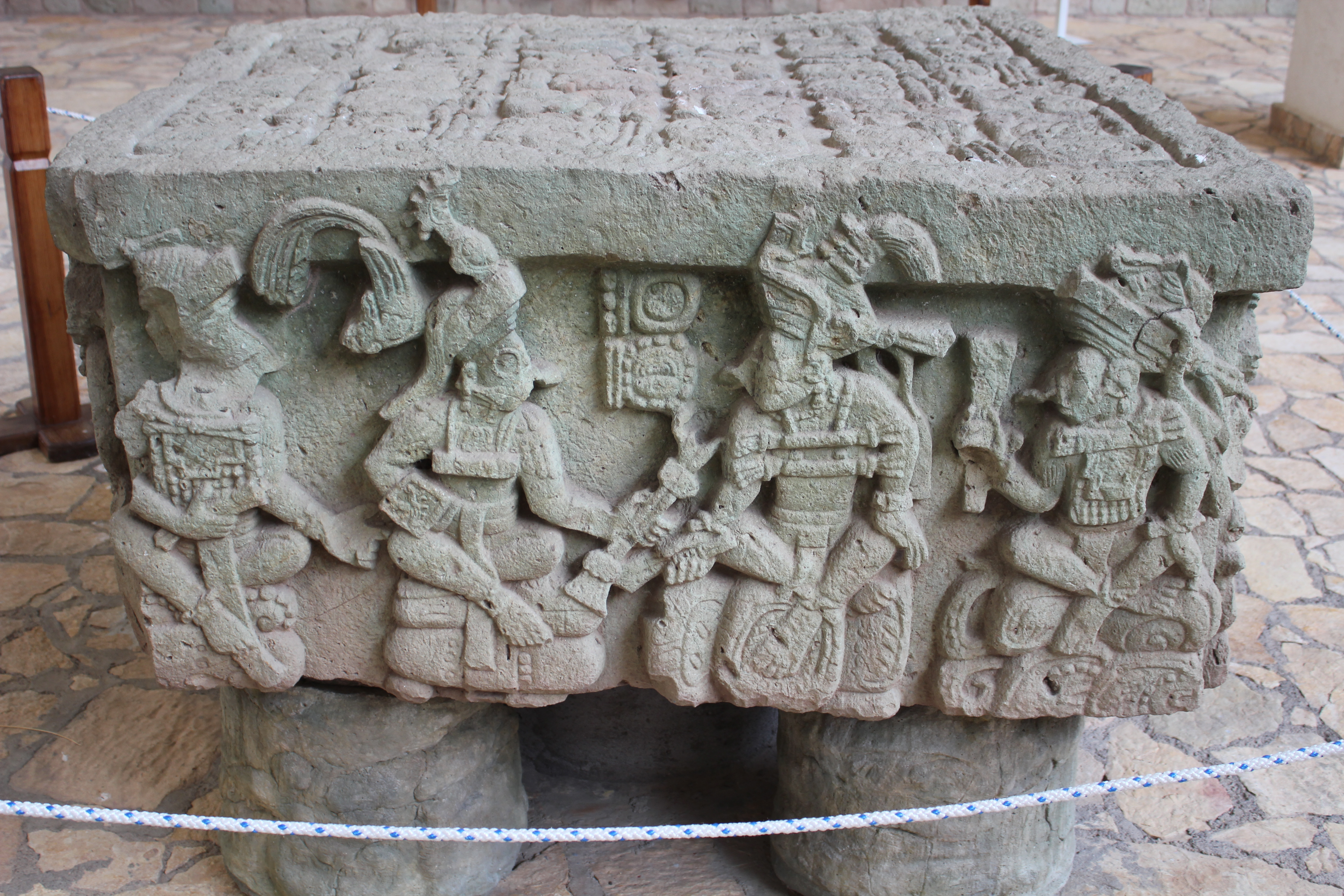
Altar Q

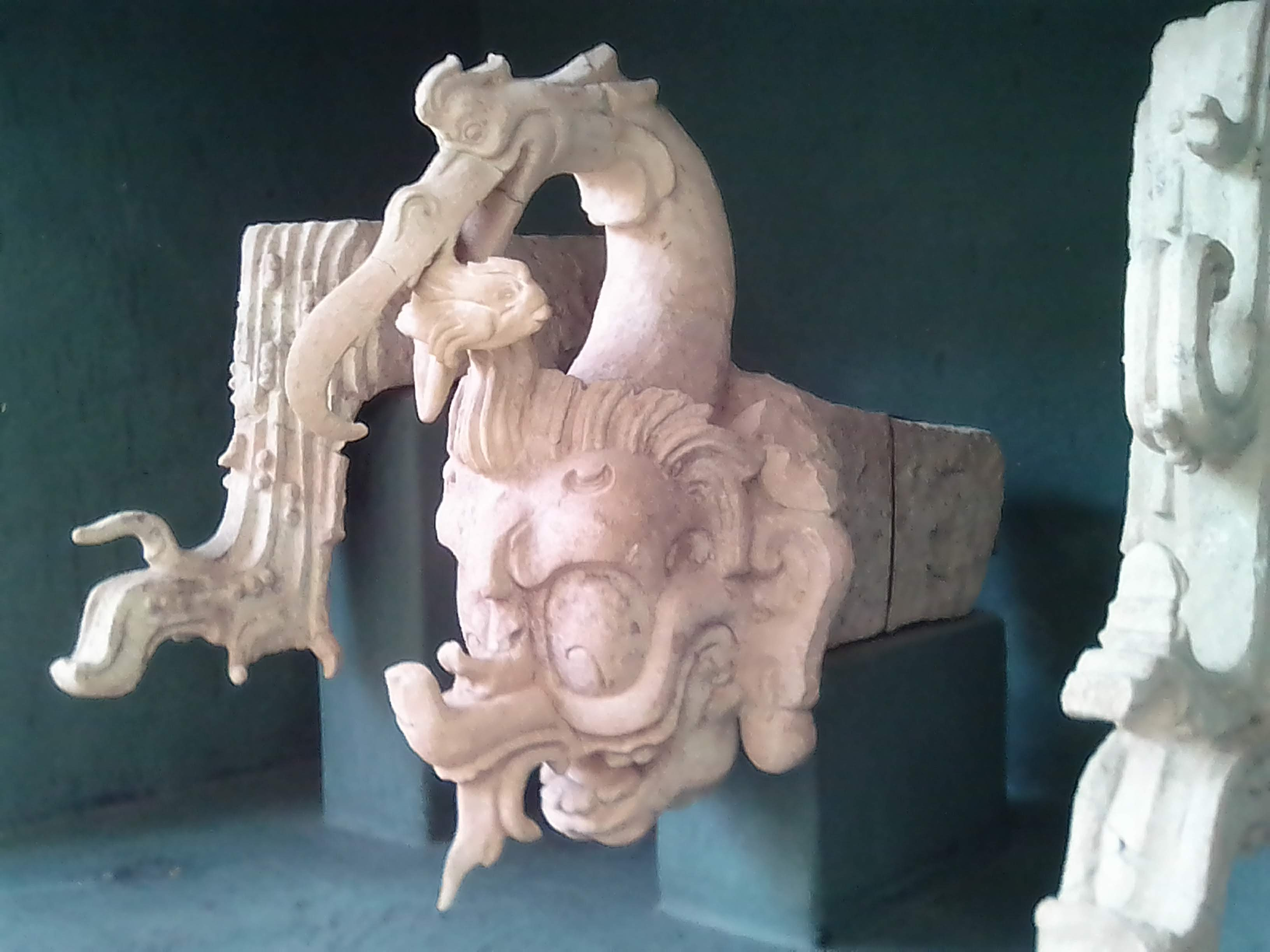
Chaac sculpture

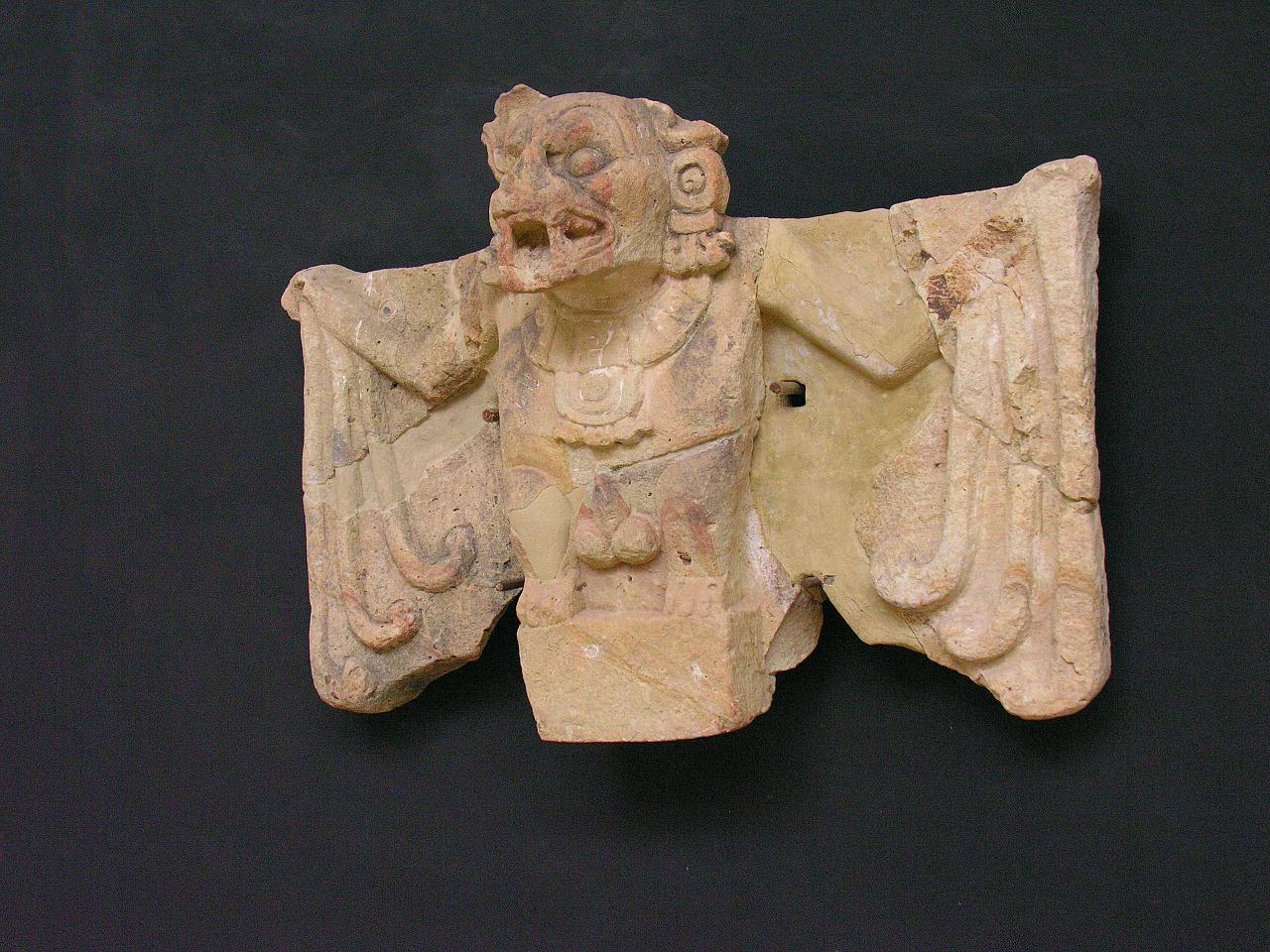
Statue of Camazotz

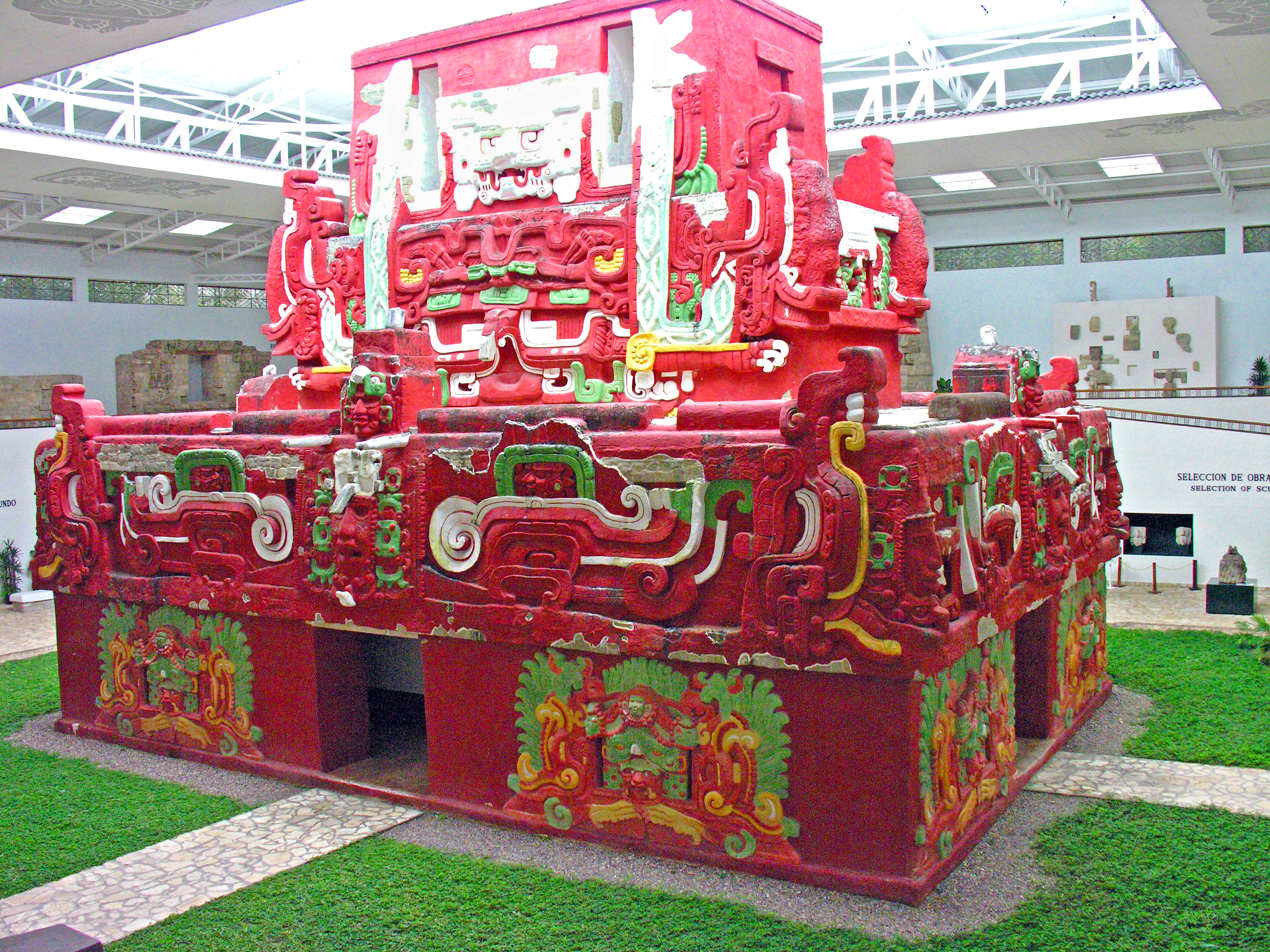
Rosalila temple replica

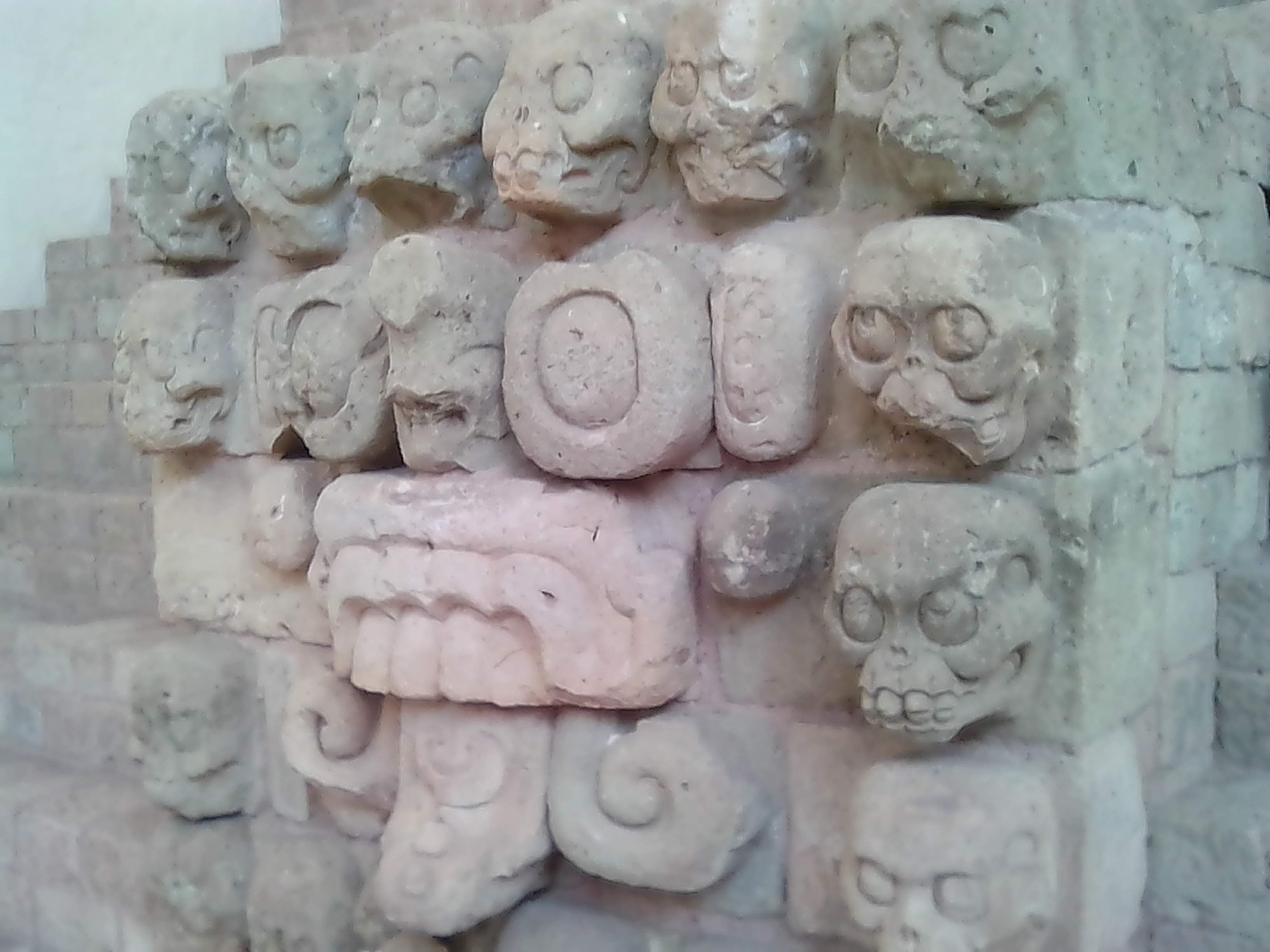
Temple statute of Chaac.

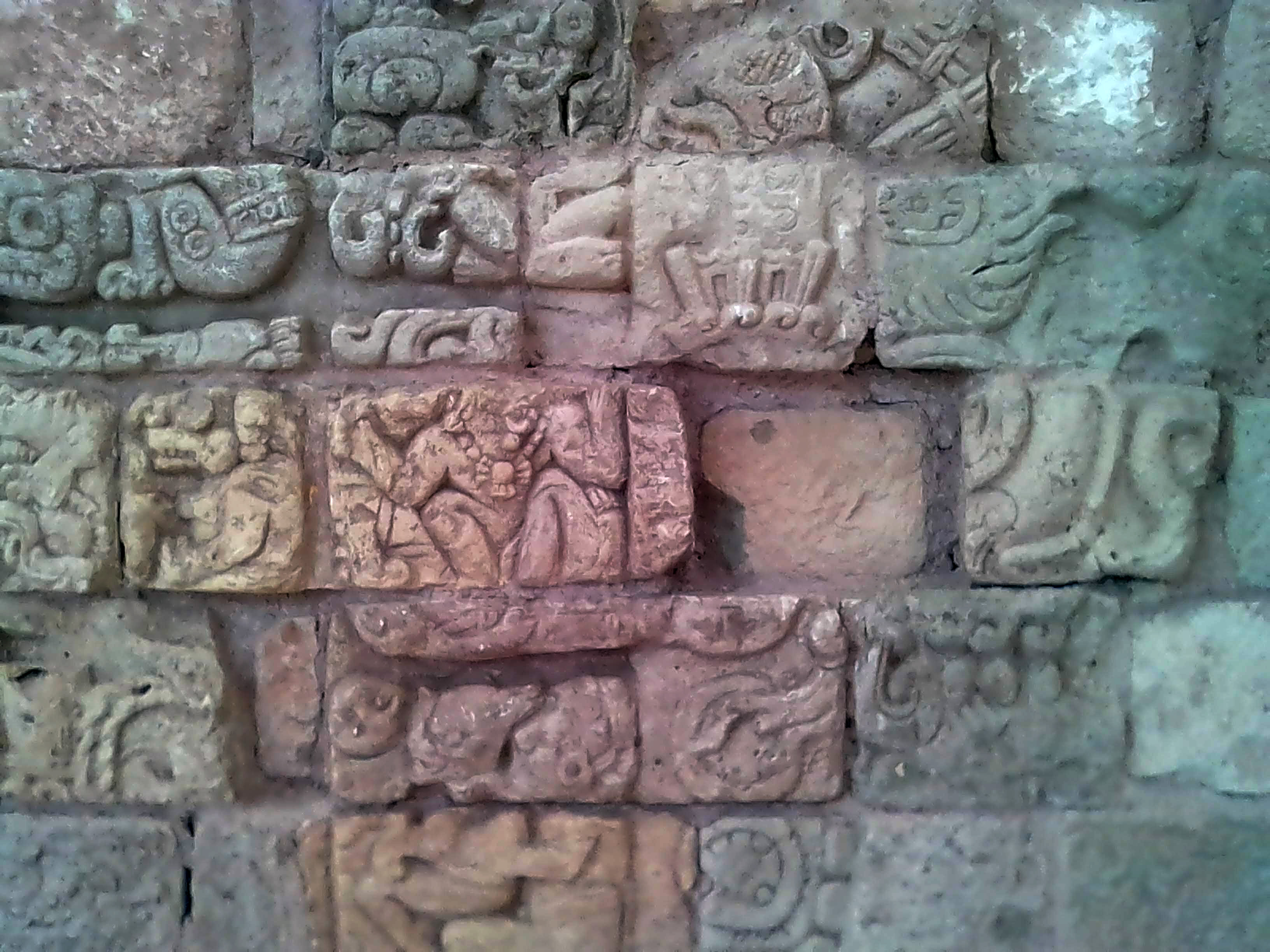
Jumble of Maya glyphs

== See also ==
- El puente
- Rio Amarillo
- Cerro Palenque
