= Dolores, Copán =

Dolores
- Location within Honduras
- Coordinates: 14°52′0″N 88°50′0″W
- Country: Honduras
- Department: Copán.

Area
  - Total: 47 km^{2} (18 sq mi)

Population (2015)
  - Total: 6,652
  - Density: 140/km^{2} (370/sq mi)

Dolores is a municipality in the Honduran department of Copán.

== History ==
The area of Dolores in 1887 was heavily populated, which resembled Santa Rosa de Copan at the time. However, Dolores was not recognized as a municipality until January 1, 1920. Dulce Nombre, another municipality in Copán, was created in 1907. Dolores formed as a member of this municipality on April 11, 1919, where it stayed until becoming its own municipality.

== Villages ==
Dolores, Copán is home to the following villages:

- Agua Buena
- Dolores; which is the head of the municipality
- El Balsamo or La Canteada
- El Camalote
- Joyas Galanas
- Pasquingal
- Plan del Naranjo
- San Antonio
- Vega Redonda or San Antonio Flores
- Yaruconte
