= Las Flores, Honduras =

Las Flores
- Municipality
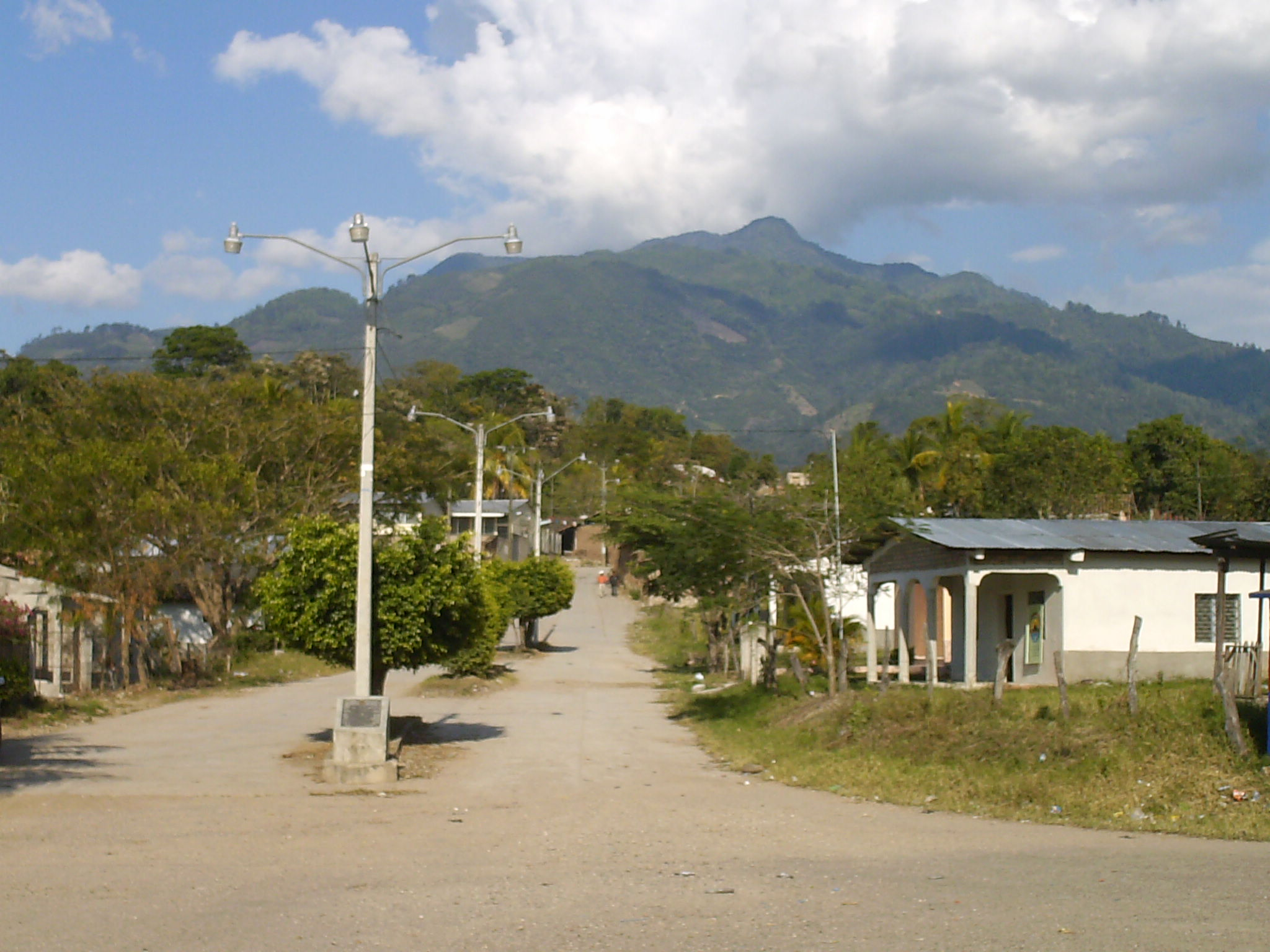
- Main entrance with Puca mountain on the back

- Location in Honduras
- Coordinates: 14°42′N 88°36′W
- Country: Honduras
- Department: Lempira
- Municipality since: 1 January 1869; 157 years ago

Area
  - Total: 78 km^{2} (30 sq mi)

Population (2015)
  - Total: 9,838
  - Density: 130/km^{2} (330/sq mi)

Las Flores is a municipality in the Honduran department of Lempira.

Las Flores is one of the municipalities of the Lempira department. It is located 17 kilometres (11 miles) from Gracias on the paved road that leads to Santa Rosa de Copán. The town is 200 metres (660 feet) away from the paved road.

== History ==
The very first settlers were from La Paz department. It was first called "Las Flores de Santa Bárbara", honoring the image of the saint of that place. It was granted the category of municipality on 1 January 1869.

== Geography ==
This municipality is in a valley, near to a river. The vegetation corresponds to dry sub-tropical forests. The weather is hot since it is in a valley. There are some hills around it but they are not so high or steep.

== Boundaries ==
Its boundaries are:

- North: Lepaera municipality
- South: Gracias municipality
- East: Gracias municipality
- West: Talgua municipality and Copán department
- Surface Extents: 78 km^{2}

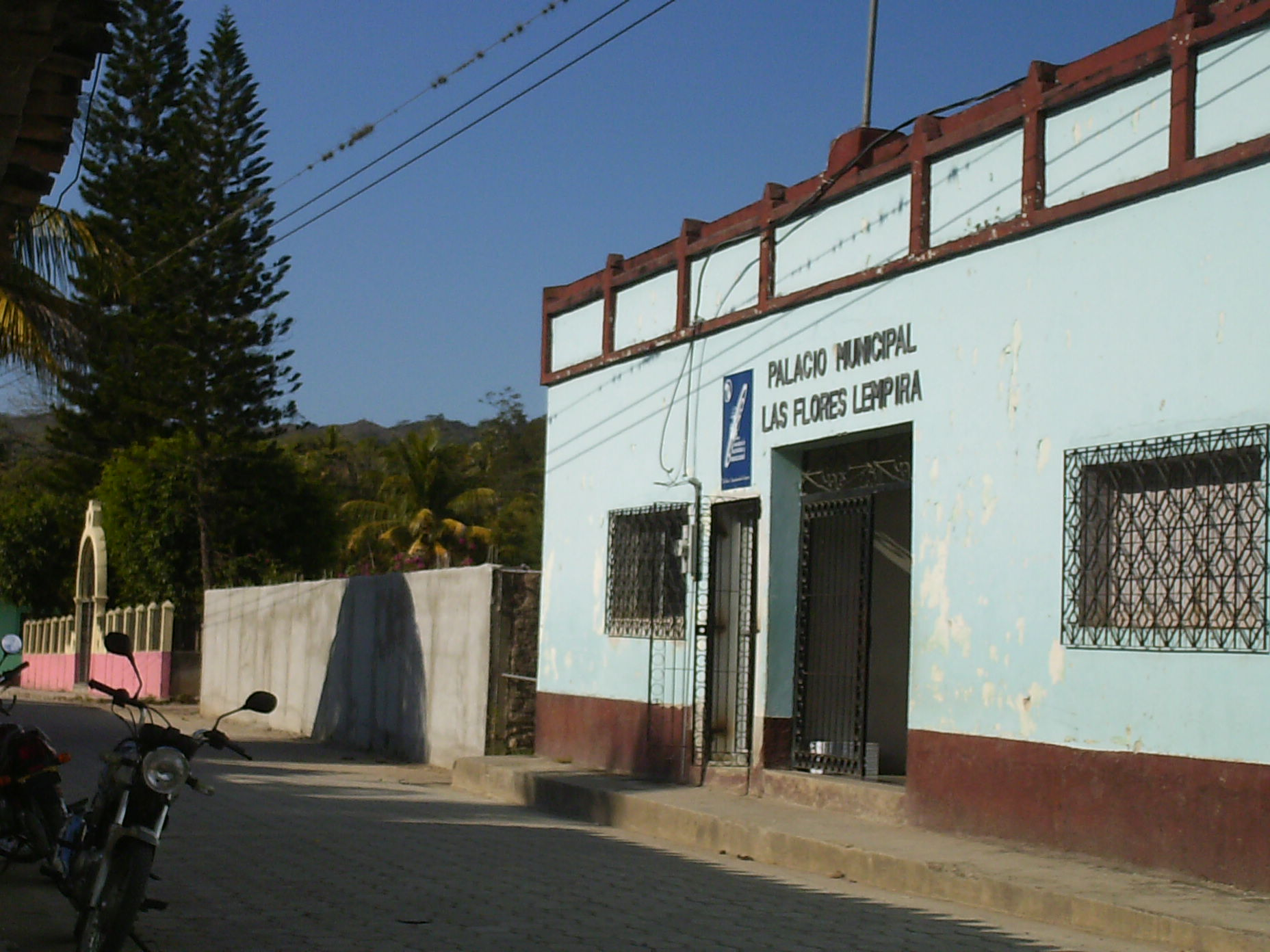
The Local Mayor's Office

== Resources ==
The most important economical activity is commerce due to its location near to Gracias city and Santa Rosa de Copán city. On both sides of the road are several restaurants, stores, and car workshops. Cattle and Milk products are for local consumption. Another popular activity is to collect gravel, sand and construction materials from the two nearby rivers. Most of this material is required by Gracias city. Recently, the material has been used in the highway extension between Gracias, Lempira, and La Esperanza, Intibucá. Most of the people that live in the town only make their school in there. After that most of the people move to the nearest city, Santa Rosa de Copan, where education is more efficient. Because of the peace that the inhabitants experience it is very normal for them to gather at the central park or on streets very late at night.

== Population ==
In this case, 90% of the people are cross-breed of native Indians and Spanish settlers.

- Population: the figure for 2001 was 7,509. And for 2015, it's estimated at 9,838.
- Villages: 10
- Settlements: 40

=== Demographics ===
At the time of the 2013 Honduras census, Las Flores municipality had a population of 9,512. Of these, 97.43% were Mestizo, 1.45% White, 0.83% Indigenous, 0.27% Black or Afro-Honduran, and 0.01% others.

== Tourism ==
A 1 hour visit to the downtown of Las Flores will do to get to know it. There are several places to go swimming because of the rivers. There are a couple of places with internet access.

- Local Holidays: "Santa Barbara" day; December 4.
- Fair: September 6–30

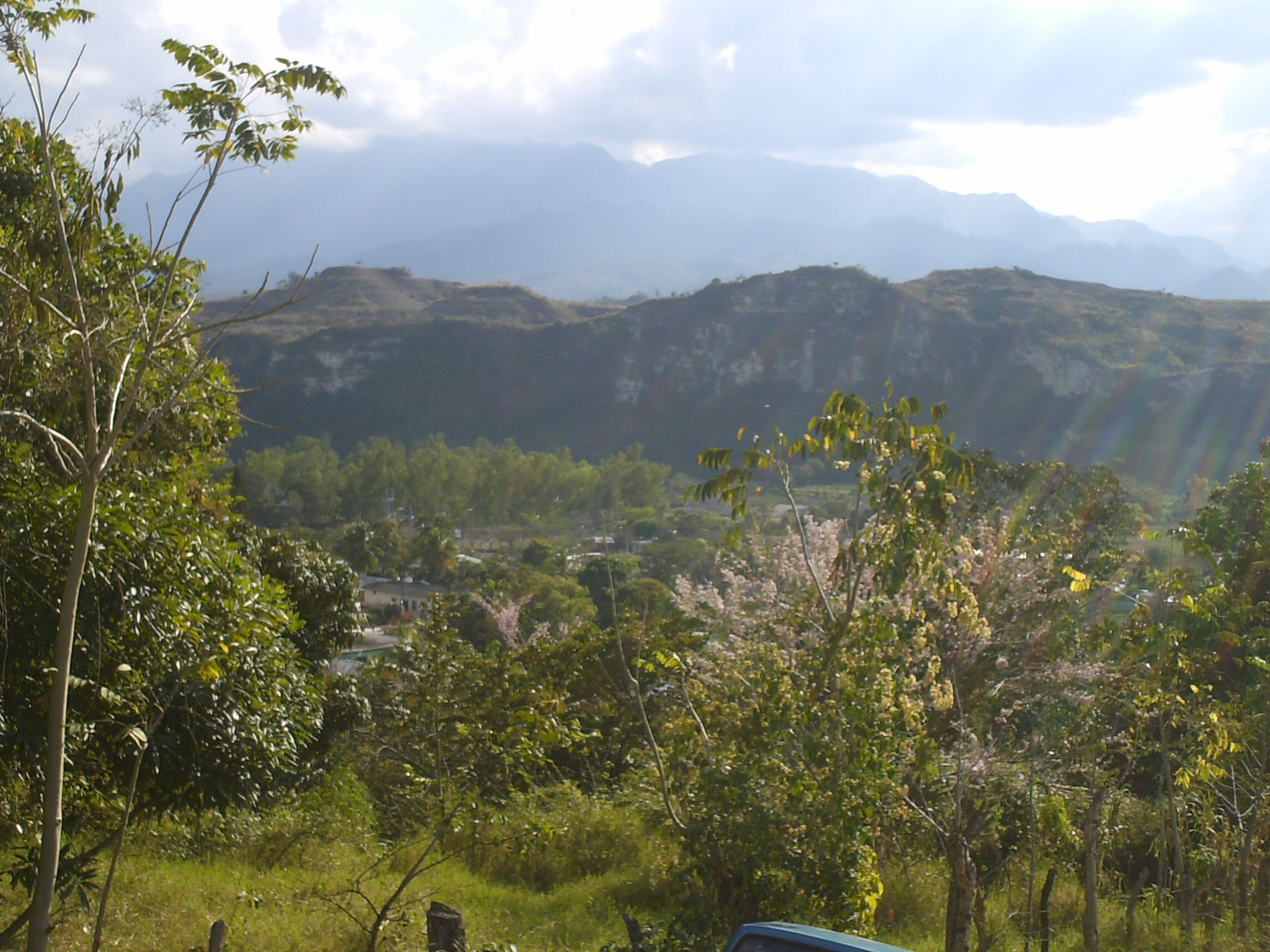
Panoramic view of town
