= October 2008 Central America floods =

Atlantic tropical depression in 2008

October 2008 Central America floods Tropical Depression Sixteen
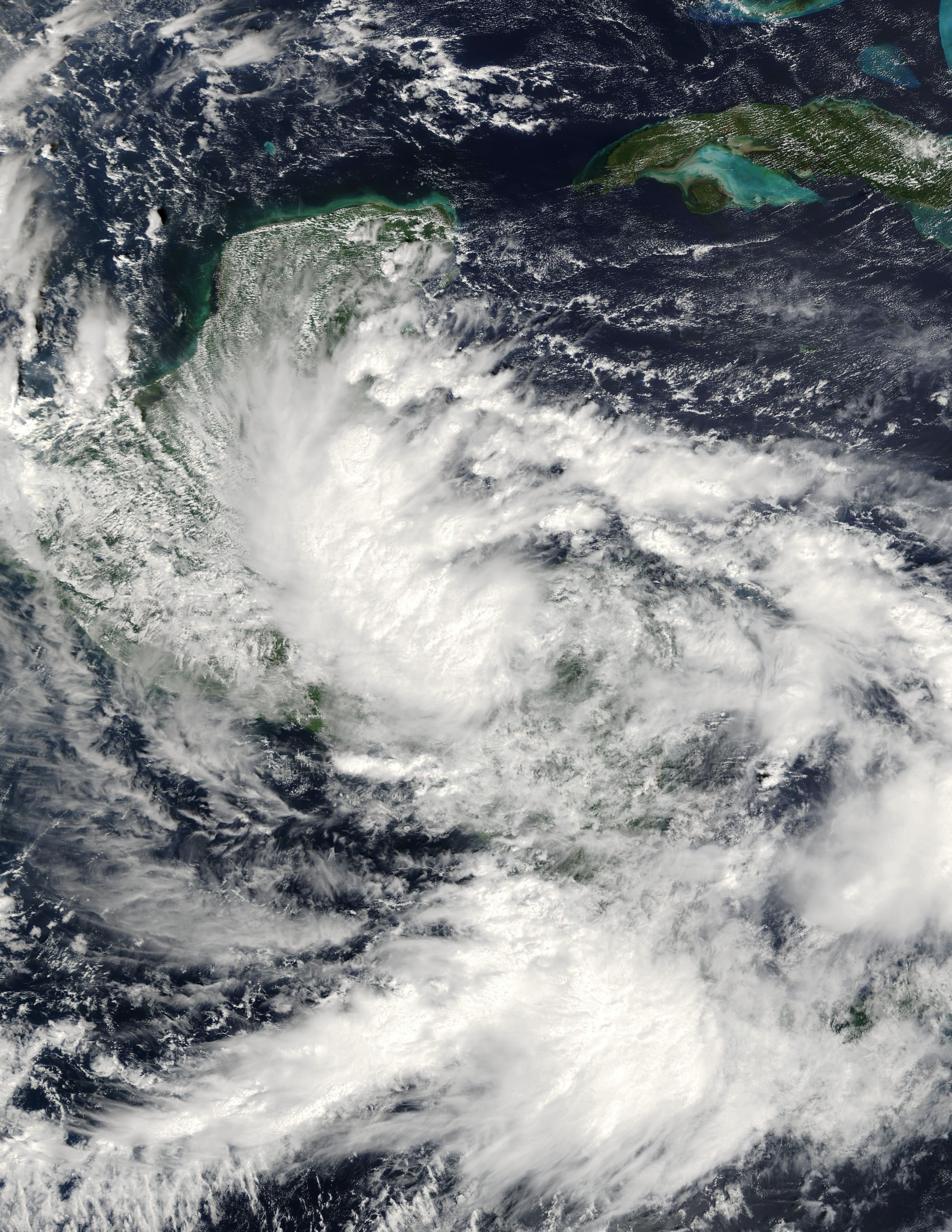
- Satellite image of Tropical Depression Sixteen over Honduras on October 15, 2008

Meteorological history
- Formed: Overall floods: October 2008; TD Sixteen: October 14, 2008
- Dissipated: TD Sixteen: October 15, 2008

Tropical depression
- 1-minute sustained (SSHWS/NWS)
- Highest winds: 30 mph (45 km/h)
- Lowest pressure: 1004 mbar (hPa); 29.65 inHg

Overall effects
- Casualties: 93 total
- Damage: At least $230 million (2008 USD)
- Areas affected: Central America, Mexico
- Part of the 2008 Atlantic hurricane season

The October 2008 Central America floods were caused by a series of low-pressure areas including Tropical Depression Sixteen, a short-lived tropical cyclone in the 2008 Atlantic hurricane season that made landfall in Honduras. Heavy rainfall began in early October 2008 while a tropical wave passed through the region. On October 14, Tropical Depression Sixteen formed just off the northeast coast of Honduras, and at the same time a low-pressure system was on the Pacific coast. Both systems increased rainfall across the region, although the depression dropped heavy rainfall close to its center when it moved ashore on October 15. Although Tropical Depression Sixteen quickly dissipated over land, its remnants persisted for several days. Another low-pressure area interacted with a cold front on October 21, adding to the rainfall in the region.

Heavy rainfall extended from Costa Rica to southeastern Mexico, causing what was considered the worst natural disaster in the region since Hurricane Mitch in 1998. In the former country, rainfall totaled 2,100 millimetres (83 in) over several weeks, making the week ending October 17 the wettest in San José since 1944. Floods in Costa Rica damaged 32 bridges and roads in 174 locations, while 1,396 homes were damaged, killing seven people. In Nicaragua to the north, weeks of heavy rainfall killed 16 people and damaged or destroyed 1,333 houses. In Honduras where the tropical depression made landfall, rainfall reached 1.2 metres (3.9 ft) in some areas, although the highest official total there related to the depression was 360 millimetres (14 in) on the offshore Roatán over six days. About 40% of municipalities in the country experienced flooding, forcing over 50,000 people to leave their homes. The floods damaged about 50% of roads in Honduras, and over 10,000 houses were damaged or destroyed. Damage totaled about 3 billion lempiras (HNL, $225 million USD), (Note: All damage totals are in 2008 values of their respective currencies unless otherwise noted.) and there were 60 deaths.

In northern Guatemala, the floods damaged about 67,000 ha (170,000 acres) of crop fields, accounting for Q128.9 million (2008 GTQ, US$16.8 million) in crop damage. There were 17 deaths and about 4,000 damaged houses in Guatemala. In neighboring El Salvador, the rains contributed to October 2008 being the third-wettest month across the country, after Hurricane Stan in 2005 and Hurricane Mitch in 1998. One person died, and hundreds were forced to evacuate their houses. In Belize, the rains flooded about 1,000 homes, forcing the evacuation of one entire town for health reasons. The rains caused additional flooding following Tropical Storm Arthur striking the country in May, damaging a bridge that was rebuilt after Arthur. Nationwide, the floods caused BZ$54.1 million (BZD, US$27.1 million) in damage and two deaths.

== Meteorological history ==
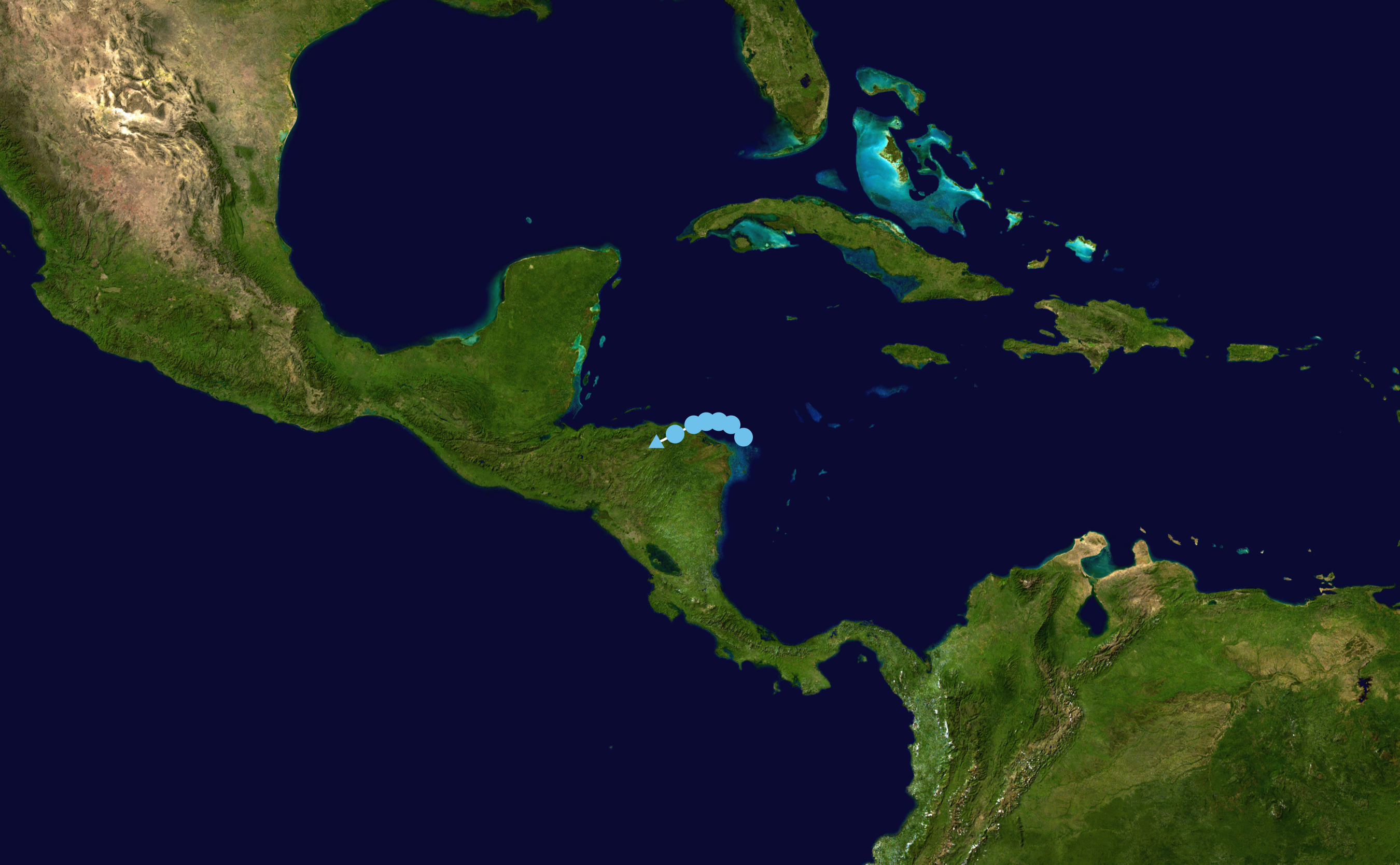
Map plotting the storm's track and intensity, according to the Saffir–Simpson scale Map key Saffir–Simpson scale Tropical depression (≤38 mph, ≤62 km/h) Tropical storm (39–73 mph, 63–118 km/h) Category 1 (74–95 mph, 119–153 km/h) Category 2 (96–110 mph, 154–177 km/h) Category 3 (111–129 mph, 178–208 km/h) Category 4 (130–156 mph, 209–251 km/h) Category 5 (≥157 mph, ≥252 km/h) Unknown Storm type Tropical cyclone Subtropical cyclone Extratropical cyclone, remnant low, tropical disturbance, or monsoon depression

Widespread rainfall occurred throughout Central America in early October 2008 due to the passage of a tropical wave through the region. Later, another tropical wave approached the region, which was believed to have left the west coast of Africa on September 17. The wave developed a low-pressure area on October 10 in the southwestern Caribbean, with sporadic convection. On October 13, the system consisted of a large area of convection drifting northward offshore eastern Central America, and Dvorak classifications began, indicating gradual organization. At that time, there was another low-pressure area on the Pacific coast, and both systems were producing rainfall across Central America.

At 1200 UTC on October 14, the National Hurricane Center (NHC) indicated that Tropical Depression Sixteen developed about 85 kilometres (53 mi) northeast of Cabo Gracias a Dios, a point where the border of Nicaragua and Honduras meet the Caribbean. In the hours after the depression's formation, the convection decreased, and hurricane hunters indicated that the small low-level circulation was rotating around a broader circulation. Shortly after 1200 UTC on October 15, the weak tropical depression made landfall just west of Punta Patuca in northern Honduras, with a broad and ill-defined circulation. Continuing west-southwestward over land, the circulation dissipated on October 16 over the mountains of central Honduras, although the depression's remnants continued to produce rainfall across the region for several days. On October 21, a cold front was moving through the Yucatán Peninsula, interacting with a newly formed low in the Gulf of Honduras to produce additional rainfall.

== Preparations ==
Around the time when the NHC began issuing advisories on the depression, officials issued a tropical storm warning for northern Honduras that eventually covered the country's entire coastline. A tropical storm warning was also issued for the coast of Belize. When the NHC began issuing advisories on the depression, the agency anticipated the depression would intensify into a strong tropical storm, based on low wind shear and warm sea surface temperatures; however, the agency noted uncertainty in the track. A ridge to the north was expected to steer the nascent depression westward, and two tropical cyclone forecast models predicted the storm would continue west-northwestward to strike Belize. Other models forecast a more immediate landfall, which would limit intensification. While the storm was active, officials in Honduras issued a yellow alert for seven departments where heavy rainfall had occurred. A nationwide yellow alert was also issued for El Salvador, meaning there was potential for flooding and landslides, although alerts were dropped on October 21 when the threat of rainfall diminished.

== Impact ==
Although a weak tropical cyclone, the depression and its remnants dropped heavy rainfall across Central America for several days, spreading into Nicaragua, Honduras, Guatemala, and Belize. In Honduras where it made landfall, rainfall peaked at 360 millimetres (14 in) on the offshore Roatán over six days. A member from Mercy Corps estimated the rainfall in October to have totaled around 1.2 metres (3.9 ft) in some areas. On the mainland, rainfall reached 266 millimetres (10.5 in) at El Empalme. In El Salvador, the depression dropped heavy rainfall, mainly in the southern coastal portion, with a 24-hour peak of 239 millimetres (9.4 in) in Puerto Parada en La Unión. Over a period of eight days, rainfall in Belize reached 547 millimetres (21.5 in) at Baldy Beacon. Rainfall extended as far north as southeastern Mexico. Throughout the region, the flooding destroyed about 10,000 homes and left about 250,000 people homeless. News agencies considered the flooding the worst in the region since Hurricane Mitch in 1998.

According to Costa Rica's National Meteorology Institute, the week ending on October 17 was the wettest in San José since 1944. Over a period of several weeks, rainfall reached about 2,100 millimetres (83 in). The influence between the precursor to the depression and a low-pressure area in the eastern Pacific caused flooding in Costa Rica that killed seven people. In Guanacaste Province, a landslide covered three cars, and in Monteverde, another landslide knocked over a power line that killed two people. In Parrita, an ambulance carrying four people was struck by a fallen tree, while in Puntarenas, another vehicle was struck by a tree, killing one of its occupants. Transport was disrupted in widespread areas in the north and south of the country due to landslides blocking roads. Across the country, the floods compromised roads in 174 locations and damaged 32 bridges. Flooding isolated about 6,900 people in 75 communities, and about 77,000 people were forced to leave their homes. Power outages affected 89 communities, and 424 water wells along the Pacific coast were polluted. Nationwide, the floods damaged 1,396 houses and 39 schools.

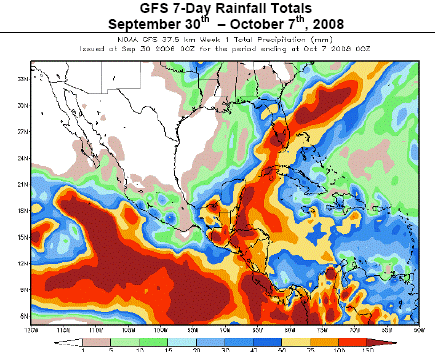
Rainfall forecast for first week of October 2008 for Central America; darker shades of red indicate the threat for heavy rainfall

In early October, heavy rainfall began affecting Nicaragua, causing mudslides and flooding. The tropical depression added to weeks of heavy rainfall that killed 16 people, many caused by people attempting to cross swollen rivers. Toward the end of October 2008, Lake Managua overflowed, causing flooding in the capital city of Managua. Across the country, 2,273 people evacuated to storm shelters after the floods damaged or destroyed 1,333 houses. Transportation was disrupted when the floods wrecked four bridges and 154 miles (248 km) of highways. Classes were canceled in León and Chinandega departments. The crops in the latter department were almost entirely destroyed.

Following months of drought conditions, the heavy rainfall in Honduras caused flooding, initially in the southern and central portions, although the entire country experienced rainfall, with 40% of municipalities experiencing flooding. The rains caused widespread landslides, particularly in the western and central portions. In the capital city Tegucigalpa, the rainfall in October was estimated to have been twice the average annual total. In two locations, the Pan-American Highway was disrupted by either landslide or flooding, and widespread areas were isolated nationwide by flooded roads. According to Reuters, about 50% of the roads in Honduras were damaged during the floods, with 227 roads and 106 bridges damaged. A landslide near Corquín blocked a river and created a natural dam, forcing hundreds of nearby residents to leave. In Colón Department, the Tocoa River overflowed, while flooding in Atlántida damaged crop lands. A total of 101,107 ha (249,840 acres) of crops were damaged, mostly in Comayagua Department. 14 water systems were damaged, and 150,000 people lost power in Olancho Department. Landslides in Tegucigalpa killed six and displaced about 500 people. In El Progreso, 375 inmates from a jail had to be evacuated to another facility. A total of 50,676 people were forced to evacuate in the country, most of whom stayed in shelters. 2,474 homes were destroyed in Honduras, with another 8,688 damaged or flooded. In addition, at least nine schools were damaged or destroyed. Nationwide, the floods killed 60 people, and damage was estimated at about 3 billion lempiras (HNL, US$225 million). The low death toll compared to Hurricane Mitch was largely due to the widespread evacuations.

Floods in Guatemala overflowed rivers and caused landslides in Izabal and Petén departments, blocking many roads. The rising rivers damaged about 175 houses, forcing hundreds of people to leave their homes. About 67,000 ha (170,000 acres) of crop fields were damaged or destroyed, including corn, rice, and beans, and crop damage nationwide was estimated at Q128.9 million (2008 GTQ, US$16.8 million). About 2.5% of the national corn crop and 3.7% of the rice crop were wrecked during the floods. Nationwide, about 4,000 houses and 82 roads were damaged or destroyed, and 17 people died in the country from the floods. In neighboring El Salvador, floods affected the houses of about 600 families. High levels forced officials to release water from several dams, causing urban flooding. Along the coastline, the floods damaged maize and bean crops. The average rainfall across El Salvador for the month of October was 475 millimetres (18.7 in). This was the third-highest for October since such record keeping began in 1971, after 2005 when Hurricane Stan struck and 1998 when Hurricane Mitch crossed the area. The tropical depression killed one person in the country.

In Belize, the rainfall in one week represented the average monthly values at some stations. Heavy rainfall from the depression caused levels to rise along rivers and creeks. A bridge that had been rebuilt following earlier Tropical Storm Arthur was flooded, prompting the Belize Defence Force to assist in crossings. This isolated much of Cayo District from the rest of the country until the bridge was repaired. On the western portion of the district, flooding along the Macal River damaged a bridge crossing into northern Guatemala, which restricted traffic only to people returning home. Levels along the Macal and the Belize River were higher than the floods of Hurricane Mitch in 1998, but less than that of Hurricane Keith in 2000. The floods caused residents to evacuate after over 1,000 homes were flooded; 311 people stayed in shelters, while the remainder stayed with families and relatives. Of the affected houses, 12 were destroyed and 802 were severely damaged. Most of the affected population was in rural areas of western Belize. One village in Orange Walk District had to be quarantined due to the health threat from the floods for 25 days. Many roads were closed, and there were widespread school closures. Overall, the floods killed two people in the country and caused BZ$54.1 million (BZD, US$27.1 million) in damage. Most of the damage was agricultural, accounting for BZ$28.2 million (BZD, US$14.1 million), or 25% of the country's agricultural gross domestic product. Other damage included BZ$11.7 million (BZD, US$6.3 million) to roads and bridges. The ongoing floods caused BZ$2.7 million (BZD, US$1.5 million) in tourism losses, due to closed facilities and water damage.

== Aftermath ==
Following the floods in Costa Rica, the country's Red Cross opened shelters to house storm victims. The government advised residents not to drink water out of fear it could be polluted from the flooding. A state of emergency was declared on October 18 due to the effects in Costa Rica. In Nicaragua, officials deployed about 3,000 soldiers to assist in flood operations. The World Food Programme provided about 8 tons of food to families in El Salvador affected by the flooding. Then-president of Honduras Manuel Zelaya declared a national state of emergency on October 19. In Honduras, pre-positioned supplies from UNICEF quickly diminished due to the widespread distribution of blankets and medical kits, raising fears for the spread of disease. The World Food Programme provided about 58 tons of food to 5,500 families in Honduras. Residents returned home as floodwaters gradually receded. The Mercy Corps later provided corn and bean seeds to 1,300 Honduran farmers to regrow the damaged crops. In May 2009, the World Bank provided $25 million (USD) to Honduras to rebuild damaged roads and bridges. Workers in Guatemala airlifted food to storm victims due to residual flooding. The Guatemalan government provided $6.6 million to residents in the northern portion of the country, including medical supplies and seeds to regrow crops. A state of emergency was declared for Cayo District in Belize. Search and rescue teams were deployed to the district, and medical crews visited several towns, providing help to 3,000 people. The Belize National Emergency Management Organization provided meals to about 9,000 people following the floods.

Across the affected areas, the Red Cross spent about $247,000 to provide food and blankets. In the weeks and months following the flooding, various international groups provided aid totaling nearly $11 million. The United States donated $622,732 worth of assistance, mainly to help with logistical work and relief efforts. The United States military also worked to purify drinking water in Honduras. Canada donated $412,201 worth of assistance, including providing shelter in Honduras and rebuilding schools. The country of Brazil donated about $1.68 million worth of food. The Humanitarian Aid and Civil Protection department of the European Commission provided nearly $2.2 million for relief efforts. Other European country donations included nearly $500,000 from Ireland for hygiene and food supplies, $675,675 from the Netherlands for general relief efforts, $154,570 from Spain through the World Food Programme, $159,559 from Germany for shelters, and $892,468 from Sweden. Several Asian countries donated to the relief efforts, including $123,810 from Japan to Honduras to purchase emergency goods, $22,000 from South Korea, and $10,000 from Singapore to Honduras. Non-governmental organizations and other groups providing aid included $1.5 million from the Central Emergency Response Fund, $300,000 from the Bill & Melinda Gates Foundation, $120,000 from Catholic Relief Services, and $289,000 from ACT Alliance.

In November, weeks after the tropical depression struck Honduras, Tropical Storm Paloma formed in the western Caribbean and caused additional rainfall in the region.
