= El Paraíso, Honduras =

El Paraíso, Honduras may refer to:

- El Paraíso Department
- El Paraíso, El Paraíso
- El Paraíso, Copán
