= El Puente (Maya site) =

Archaeological Maya site in Honduras

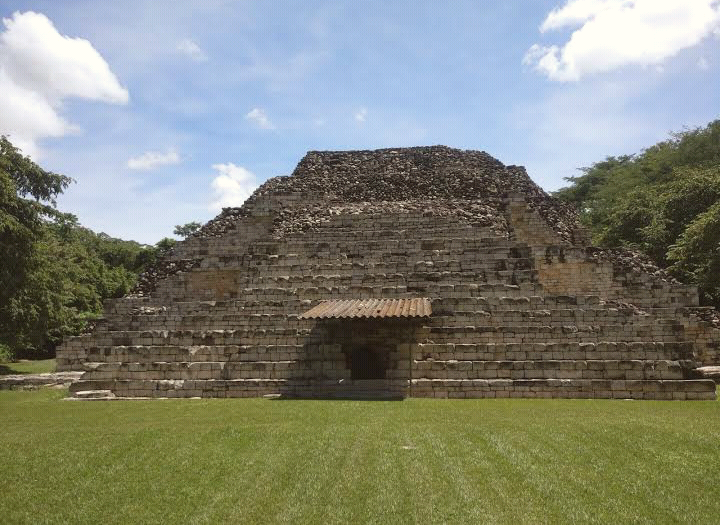
- Interactive map of El Puente
- 15°6′36″N 88°47′30″W
- Periods: Classic Period
- Cultures: Maya civilization
- Location: La Jigua
- Region: Copán Department, Honduras

Site notes
- Architectural style: Classic Maya
- Excavation dates: 1991–1994
- Archaeologists: Proyecto Arqueológico La Entrada
- Restored: 1991–1994

El Puente, or the Parque Arqueológico El Puente ("El Puente Archaeological Park"), is a Maya archaeological site in the department of Copán in Honduras. Once an independent Maya city, the city of El Puente became a tributary to the nearby city of Copán between the 6th and 9th centuries AD. The site contains more than 200 structures that include tombs, religious structures, and living quarters, but only a few have been excavated, including a large Maya step pyramid.

El Puente is located in the Florida Valley in the municipality of La Jigua, 11 kilometres (6.8 mi) to the north of the Honduran town of La Entrada. The site is 2 kilometres (1.2 mi) north of the confluence of the Chamelecón and Chinamito Rivers. El Puente is 20 kilometres (12 mi) east of the El Paraíso archaeological site. The site is located within the Southern Maya area on the southeastern periphery of Mesoamerica, and it was situated on the frontier between Maya and non-Maya peoples.

The site was first described by Jens Yde in 1935. He mapped the site but did not carry out any excavations. The site received a Cultural Heritage of the Nation designation by executive decree in March 1989. The La Entrada Archaeological Project (PALE – from Proyecto Arqueológico La Entrada in Spanish) started excavations at El Puente in 1991 with the intention of creating the second archaeological park in the country, after Copán. The Parque Arqueológico El Puente opened on 20 January 1994 and includes a visitor centre, site museum and administrative offices.

== History ==
El Puente appears to have been first settled around the middle of the 6th century AD, in the Early Classic period, fairly late in the Mesoamerican timescale and occupation at the site did not last very long. Architectural and ceramic similarities with Copán suggest that El Puente was founded by that city to control the crossroads of two trade routes that met in the valley. The site was a regional centre during the Late Classic period when it remained closely allied with the great city of Copán.

After the collapse of Copán in the Terminal Classic (between AD 850–950), the La Entrada region suffered politically with local elites losing prestige and territory. However, unlike at Copán, there does not seem to have been overuse of local resources and El Puente appears to have received immigrants from Copán during the Late Classic.

== Site description ==
Although the architecture is predominantly Maya there are slight non-Maya influences from the neighbouring non-Maya area, such as long structures connected end-to-end. The architecture at El Puente also tends to lack the symmetry found in traditional Maya sites with a long occupational history, perhaps due to a lesser level of technical ability. For example, stairways on the main buildings are of different sizes on each of the four sides of the structures. Quality of workmanship in the working of stone for construction can differ markedly from one building to the next, or even within the same structure.

The principal materials for construction were tufa, schist and a hard limestone, with tufa being the commonest stone used at the site. The tufa is very fragile and the cut tufa stones have frequently crumbled to dust. The infill used within the structures is quite inconsistent and consists of stone, earth and clay. The mortar used in construction was of low quality, with little lime, using only a hard clay that was particularly vulnerable to water damage, causing the stucco facing to come away from the structures and resulting in their complete collapse.

The plazas had a well-designed drainage system to channel runoff rainwater. These channels were carved from stone and at the base of Structure 5 one of the channels is still functional. Another has been excavated on the east side of Structure 3.

Several burials have been excavated, some are accompanied by offerings of jade and ceramic vessels decorated with bands of hieroglyphs. One of these vessels contained an additional offering of 13 obsidian prismatic blades. Rough stones were placed in a circle around one burial, with a seashell placed beside the skull.

Green obsidian from the Pachuca source in central Mexico has been excavated at the site.

=== Structures ===
El Puente has 210 structures and the site core contains 5 plazas. Nine structures at the site have been investigated and restored. Parts of the site have been severely damaged by looters and by agricultural activities.

Structure 1 is the tallest building at El Puente, measuring 12 metres (39 ft) tall. It appears to have been built in the 7th century AD, its earliest version bears a stylistic similarity to buildings from that period in Copán. It was a radial pyramid with six tiers and stairways on all four sides, with the east and west stairways being the best preserved. It was topped by a superstructure with three rooms and fallen remains indicated that it had a vaulted roof with channels to drain off rainwater. The wall was decorated with sculptures of three human figures. Archaeologists have tunnelled within the structure and have also excavated around it, revealing a large amount of ceramic fragments, burnt clay, and burnt maize and beans. The structure has been badly damaged by looters.

Structure 3 has excellent quality stonework in the wall on the north side of its first-level platform but the rest of the building features markedly poorer quality workmanship.

Structure 4 is on the northwest side of Plaza 1, at the extreme northwest of the site core.

Structure 5 is also on the northwest side of Plaza 1, at the extreme northwest of the site core. It has three Copán-style rooms and traces of domestic activity were found during excavation. At only 30 centimetres (12 in) thick, the walls were not thick enough to have supported a vaulted roof.

Structure 31 is a pyramid on the eastern side of the site core. Its eastern portion has been badly damaged by looters. The structure supported two rooms. The main room has the remains of a stone bench and an entrance that opens onto the main stairway that climbs the west side of the structure from Plaza C. The building had several construction phases, all dating to the Late Classic. Excavators found an increase in fragments of Copán-style polychrome ceramics in the final construction phase. An altar and a stela were associated with the temple, the stela was not inscribed with any hieroglyphic text.

== See also ==
- Quiriguá
