= Municipalities of Honduras =

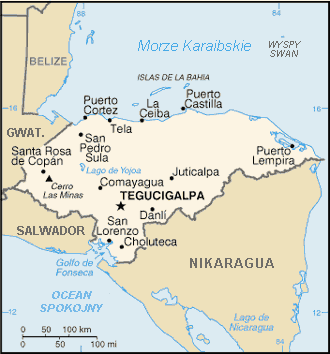
Cities in Honduras

Honduras is administratively divided into 18 departments, which are subdivided into 298 municipalities (Spanish: municipios). Municipalities are the only administrative division in Honduras that possess local government. Each municipality has its own elected mayor as opposed to the appointed governors of departments. For statistical purposes, the municipalities are further subdivided into 3731 aldeas, and those into 27969 caserios. At the lowest level, some caserios are subdivided into 3336 barrios or colonias.

== List of municipalities ==
Departmental Capital†

National Capital and Departmental Capital‡

Name	Department	Population (2013)	Population (2001)	Change (%)	Land area (km^{2})	Population density	Founding Date
Arizona	Atlántida	23,714	20,670	+14.7%	568.8	41.7/km^{2}	1990
El Porvenir	Atlántida	21,854	15,444	+41.5%	280.3	78.0/km^{2}	1898
Esparta	Atlántida	14,559	17,614	−17.3%	398.1	36.6/km^{2}	1902
Jutiapa	Atlántida	34,224	30,226	+13.2%	533.8	64.1/km^{2}	1906
La Ceiba†	Atlántida	197,267	140,931	+40.0%	636.4	310.0/km^{2}	1877
La Masica	Atlántida	29,427	25,509	+15.4%	471.0	62.5/km^{2}	1922
San Francisco	Atlántida	14,559	11,206	+29.9%	284.3	51.2/km^{2}	1903
Tela	Atlántida	96,758	82,499	+17.3%	1,196.4	80.9/km^{2}	1524
Apacilagua	Choluteca	9,065	9,642	−6.0%	213.1	42.5/km^{2}	1831
Choluteca†	Choluteca	152,519	134,452	+13.4%	1,069.1	142.7/km^{2}	1535
Concepción de María	Choluteca	26,875	25,054	+7.3%	156.8	171.4/km^{2}	1852
Duyure	Choluteca	3,519	2,945	+19.5%	105.5	33.4/km^{2}	1895
El Corpus	Choluteca	24,646	22,213	+11.0%	242.2	101.8/km^{2}	1827
El Triunfo	Choluteca	43,670	36,705	+19.0%	301.5	144.8/km^{2}	1887
Marcovia	Choluteca	45,639	42,671	+7.0%	482.3	94.6/km^{2}	1882
Morolica	Choluteca	5,000	5,392	−7.3%	281.3	17.8/km^{2}	1843
Namasigüe	Choluteca	30,056	25,606	+17.4%	200.9	149.6/km^{2}	1887
Orocuina	Choluteca	18,315	16,508	+10.9%	124.6	147.0/km^{2}	1646
Pespire	Choluteca	23,913	24,734	−3.3%	337.7	70.8/km^{2}	1929
San Antonio de Flores	Choluteca	5,445	5,695	−4.4%	54.0	98.5/km^{2}	1881
San Isidro	Choluteca	3,690	3,384	+9.0%	70.3	52.5/km^{2}	1876
San José	Choluteca	4,300	3,406	+26.2%	62.3	69.0/km^{2}	1861
San Marcos de Colón	Choluteca	26,494	21,643	+22.4%	582.8	45.5/km^{2}	1824
Santa Ana de Yusguare	Choluteca	14,474	10,755	+34.6%	74.3	194.8/km^{2}	1791
Balfate	Colón	13,103	11,677	+12.2%	332.3	39.4/km^{2}	1881
Bonito Oriental	Colón	28,427	24,801	+14.6%	467.5	60.8/km^{2}	1987
Iriona	Colón	20,730	18,585	+11.5%	3,986.9	5.2/km^{2}	1892
Limón	Colón	13,742	9,889	+39.0%	598.0	23.0/km^{2}	1917
Sabá	Colón	29,561	21,900	+35.0%	344.0	85.9/km^{2}	1959
Santa Fe	Colón	5,428	7,000	−22.5%	195.5	27.8/km^{2}	1881
Santa Rosa de Aguán	Colón	5,376	4,929	+9.1%	130.5	41.2/km^{2}	1892
Sonaguera	Colón	43,152	37,448	+15.2%	388.9	111.0/km^{2}	1887
Tocoa	Colón	89,849	61,370	+46.4%	848.1	105.9/km^{2}	1882
Trujillo†	Colón	60,558	49,109	+23.3%	957.1	63.3/km^{2}	1525
Ajuterique	Comayagua	11,356	9,113	+24.6%			
Comayagua†	Comayagua	144,785	96,450	+50.1%			
El Rosario	Comayagua	28,842	20,883	+38.1%			
Esquías	Comayagua	20,519	14,916	+37.6%			
Humuya	Comayagua	1,319	1,082	+21.9%			
La Libertad	Comayagua	25,891	18,542	+39.6%			
Lamaní	Comayagua	7,009	5,091	+37.7%			
Las Lajas	Comayagua	14,311	9,011	+58.8%			
La Trinidad	Comayagua	4,515	3,659	+23.4%			
Lejamaní	Comayagua	5,680	4,248	+33.7%			
Meámbar	Comayagua	12,522	10,422	+20.1%			
Minas de Oro	Comayagua	13,128	10,801	+21.5%			
Ojos de Agua	Comayagua	10,341	8,934	+15.7%			
San Jerónimo	Comayagua	20,979	15,547	+34.9%			
San José de Comayagua	Comayagua	7,797	6,085	+28.1%			
San José del Potrero	Comayagua	6,708	5,424	+23.7%			
San Luis	Comayagua	11,102	7,720	+43.8%			
San Sebastián	Comayagua	3,649	2,753	+32.5%			
Siguatepeque	Comayagua	95,121	64,704	+47.0%			
Taulabe	Comayagua	24,235	19,958	+21.4%			
Villa de San Antonio	Comayagua	23,658	17,538	+34.9%			
Cabañas	Copán	13,727	9,818	+39.8%			
Concepción	Copán	7,720	5,625	+37.2%			
Copán Ruinas	Copán	38,109	30,703	+24.1%			
Corquín	Copán	16,402	10,936	+50.0%			
Cucuyagua	Copán	16,073	11,834	+35.8%			
Dolores	Copán	6,420	5,006	+28.2%			
Dulce Nombre	Copán	5,671	4,807	+18.0%			
El Paraíso	Copán	19,882	18,397	+8.1%			
Florida	Copán	28,331	26,703	+6.1%			
La Jigua	Copán	9,288	7,915	+17.3%			
La Unión	Copán	16,007	11,536	+38.8%			
Nueva Arcadia	Copán	40,350	30,136	+33.9%			
San Agustín	Copán	5,498	3,659	+50.3%			
San Antonio	Copán	9,739	9,670	+0.7%			
San Jerónimo	Copán	5,020	4,555	+10.2%			
San José	Copán	6,975	5,397	+29.2%			
San Juan de Opoa	Copán	9,620	7,849	+22.6%			
San Nicolás	Copán	7,553	6,017	+25.5%			
San Pedro	Copán	7,540	5,168	+45.9%			
Santa Rita	Copán	29,927	24,157	+23.9%			
Santa Rosa de Copán†	Copán	61,083	40,309	+51.5%			
Trinidad de Copán	Copán	6,865	5,817	+18.0%			
Veracruz	Copán	3,259	2,752	+18.4%			
Choloma	Cortés	231,668	176,789	+31.0%			
La Lima	Cortés	71,910	62,443	+15.2%			
Omoa	Cortés	45,179	33,559	+34.6%			
Pimienta	Cortés	18,557	13,127	+41.4%			
Potrerillos	Cortés	23,678	18,945	+25.0%			
Puerto Cortés	Cortés	122,426	103,033	+18.8%			
San Antonio de Cortés	Cortés	22,135	19,969	+10.8%			
San Francisco de Yojoa	Cortés	21,955	15,098	+45.4%			
San Manuel	Cortés	53,083	34,320	+54.7%			
San Pedro Sula†	Cortés	719,064	567,713	+26.7%			
Santa Cruz de Yojoa	Cortés	82,760	65,901	+25.6%			
Villanueva	Cortés	149,977	91,613	+63.7%			
Alauca	El Paraíso	9,109		NA			
Danlí	El Paraíso	195,916	145,024	+35.1%			
El Paraíso	El Paraíso	44,770		NA			
Güinope	El Paraíso	8,510		NA			
Jacaleapa	El Paraíso	3,966		NA			
Liure	El Paraíso	10,654		NA			
Morocelí	El Paraíso	16,579		NA			
Oropolí	El Paraíso	5,931		NA			
Potrerillos	El Paraíso	4,242		NA			
San Antonio de Flores	El Paraíso	5,564		NA			
San Lucas	El Paraíso	7,712		NA			
San Matías	El Paraíso	5,040		NA			
Soledad	El Paraíso	9,350		NA			
Teupasenti	El Paraíso	41,683		NA			
Texiguat	El Paraíso	8,727		NA			
Trojes	El Paraíso	47,294		NA			
Vado Ancho	El Paraíso	3,981		NA			
Yauyupe	El Paraíso	1,335		NA			
Yuscarán†	El Paraíso	14,144	12,209	+15.8%			
Alubarén	Francisco Morazán	5,532		NA			
Cedros	Francisco Morazán	24,305		NA			
Curarén	Francisco Morazán	20,335		NA			
Distrito Central‡	Francisco Morazán	1,157,509	906,129	+27.7%	580	1,995.7/km^{2}	
El Porvenir	Francisco Morazán	20,149		NA			
Guaimaca	Francisco Morazán	28,076		NA			
La Libertad	Francisco Morazán	2,789		NA			
La Venta	Francisco Morazán	6,173		NA			
Lepaterique	Francisco Morazán	19,807		NA			
Maraita	Francisco Morazán	6,689		NA			
Marale	Francisco Morazán	9,132		NA			
Nueva Armenia	Francisco Morazán	3,515		NA			
Ojojona	Francisco Morazán	10,457		NA			
Orica	Francisco Morazán	13,815		NA			
Reitoca	Francisco Morazán	10,649		NA			
Sabanagrande	Francisco Morazán	20,496		NA			
San Antonio de Oriente	Francisco Morazán	15,006		NA			
San Buenaventura	Francisco Morazán	2,780		NA			
San Ignacio	Francisco Morazán	8,796		NA			
San Juan de Flores	Francisco Morazán	15,354		NA			
San Miguelito	Francisco Morazán	1,910		NA			
Santa Ana	Francisco Morazán	16,009		NA			
Santa Lucía	Francisco Morazán	11,906		NA			
Talanga	Francisco Morazán	34,997		NA			
Tatumbla	Francisco Morazán	7,197		NA			
Vallecillo	Francisco Morazán	8,337		NA			
Valle de Ángeles	Francisco Morazán	16,678		NA			
Villa de San Francisco	Francisco Morazán	10,508		NA			
Ahuas	Gracias a Dios	8,095		NA			
Brus Laguna	Gracias a Dios	12,720		NA			
Juan Francisco Bulnes	Gracias a Dios	6,392		NA			
Puerto Lempira†	Gracias a Dios	47,528		NA			
Villeda Morales	Gracias a Dios	10,314		NA			
Wampusirpi	Gracias a Dios	5,746		NA			
Camasca	Intibucá	6,781		NA			
Colomoncagua	Intibucá	18,214		NA			
Concepción	Intibucá	9,905		NA			
Dolores	Intibucá	5,140		NA			
Intibucá	Intibucá	56,017		NA			
Jesús de Otoro	Intibucá	28,301		NA			
La Esperanza†	Intibucá	11,631	7,817	+48.8%			
Magdalena	Intibucá	4,361		NA			
Masaguara	Intibucá	15,892		NA			
San Antonio	Intibucá	5,492		NA			
San Francisco de Opalaca	Intibucá	10,743		NA			
San Isidro	Intibucá	4,387		NA			
San Juan	Intibucá	13,405		NA			
San Marcos de la Sierra	Intibucá	8,653		NA			
San Miguel Guancapla	Intibucá	7,368		NA			
Santa Lucía	Intibucá	5,239		NA			
Yamaranguila	Intibucá	21,025		NA			
Guanaja	Bay Islands	5,445		NA			
José Santos Guardiola	Bay Islands	11,334		NA			
Roatán†	Bay Islands	41,831		NA			
Utila	Bay Islands	3,947		NA			
Aguanqueterique	La Paz	4,738		NA			
Cabañas	La Paz	3,253		NA			
Cane	La Paz	3,592		NA			
Chinacla	La Paz	7,836		NA			
Guajiquiro	La Paz	14,616		NA			
La Paz	La Paz	43,980		NA			
Lauterique	La Paz	2,986		NA			
Marcala	La Paz	28,614		NA			
Mercedes de Oriente	La Paz	1,087		NA			
Opatoro	La Paz	7,408		NA			
San Antonio del Norte	La Paz	2,725		NA			
San José	La Paz	8,928		NA			
San Juan	La Paz	2,447		NA			
San Pedro de Tutule	La Paz	6,939		NA			
Santa Ana	La Paz	11,777		NA			
Santa Elena	La Paz	12,162		NA			
Santa María	La Paz	10,812		NA			
Santiago de Puringla	La Paz	16,182		NA			
Yarula	La Paz	8,844		NA			
Belén	Lempira	6,801		NA			
Candelaria	Lempira	6,772		NA			
Cololaca	Lempira	8,532		NA			
Erandique	Lempira	15,242		NA			
Gracias†	Lempira	47,622	32,151	+48.1%			
Gualcince	Lempira	11,295		NA			
Guarita	Lempira	8,378		NA			
La Campa	Lempira	6,515		NA			
La Iguala	Lempira	25,491		NA			
Las Flores	Lempira	9,512		NA			
La Unión	Lempira	12,526		NA			
La Virtud	Lempira	6,583		NA			
Lepaera	Lempira	36,720		NA			
Mapulaca	Lempira	4,261		NA			
Piraera	Lempira	13,758		NA			
San Andrés	Lempira	13,151		NA			
San Francisco	Lempira	9,017		NA			
San Juan Guarita	Lempira	2,650		NA			
San Manuel Colohete	Lempira	14,063		NA			
San Marcos de Caiquín	Lempira	5,571		NA			
San Rafael	Lempira	13,410		NA			
San Sebastián	Lempira	10,453		NA			
Santa Cruz	Lempira	6,770		NA			
Talgua	Lempira	10,420		NA			
Tambla	Lempira	3,089		NA			
Tomalá	Lempira	6,335		NA			
Valladolid	Lempira	3,696		NA			
Virginia	Lempira	2,548		NA			
Belén Gualcho	Ocotepeque	15,438		NA			
Concepción	Ocotepeque	5,074		NA			
Dolores Merendón	Ocotepeque	3,742		NA			
Fraternidad	Ocotepeque	4,890		NA			
La Encarnación	Ocotepeque	4,961		NA			
La Labor	Ocotepeque	9,515		NA			
Lucerna	Ocotepeque	5,861		NA			
Mercedes	Ocotepeque	7,226		NA			
Ocotepeque†	Ocotepeque	23,096	17,441	+32.4%			
San Fernando	Ocotepeque	6,948		NA			
San Francisco del Valle	Ocotepeque	9,625		NA			
San Jorge	Ocotepeque	5,037		NA			
San Marcos	Ocotepeque	19,978		NA			
Santa Fe	Ocotepeque	4,851		NA			
Sensenti	Ocotepeque	11,453		NA			
Sinuapa	Ocotepeque	8,735		NA			
Campamento	Olancho	19,832		NA			
Catacamas	Olancho	117,493		NA			
Concordia	Olancho	8,188		NA			
Dulce Nombre de Culmí	Olancho	29,947		NA			
El Rosario	Olancho	4,224		NA			
Esquipulas del Norte	Olancho	10,138		NA			
Gualaco	Olancho	21,863		NA			
Guarizama	Olancho	7,769		NA			
Guata	Olancho	11,784		NA			
Guayape	Olancho	12,671		NA			
Jano	Olancho	4,553		NA			
Juticalpa†	Olancho	124,828	93,726	+33.2%			
La Unión	Olancho	7,691		NA			
Mangulile	Olancho	9,411		NA			
Manto	Olancho	11,518		NA			
Patuca	Olancho	26,668		NA			
Salamá	Olancho	7,542		NA			
San Esteban	Olancho	25,572		NA			
San Francisco de Becerra	Olancho	9,475		NA			
San Francisco de la Paz	Olancho	19,216		NA			
Santa María del Real	Olancho	10,636		NA			
Silca	Olancho	7,930		NA			
Yocón	Olancho	11,812		NA			
Arada	Santa Bárbara	9,622		NA			
Atima	Santa Bárbara	17,648		NA			
Azacualpa	Santa Bárbara	20,210		NA			
Ceguaca	Santa Bárbara	4,948		NA			
Chinda	Santa Bárbara	4,702		NA			
Concepción del Norte	Santa Bárbara	8,989		NA			
Concepción del Sur	Santa Bárbara	5,486		NA			
El Níspero	Santa Bárbara	8,109		NA			
Gualala	Santa Bárbara	5,191		NA			
Ilama	Santa Bárbara	9,058		NA			
Las Vegas	Santa Bárbara	23,980		NA			
Macuelizo	Santa Bárbara	34,401		NA			
Naranjito	Santa Bárbara	11,901		NA			
Nueva Frontera	Santa Bárbara	13,069		NA			
Nuevo Celilac	Santa Bárbara	8,086		NA			
Petoa	Santa Bárbara	12,135		NA			
Protección	Santa Bárbara	16,374		NA			
Quimistán	Santa Bárbara	47,993		NA			
San Francisco de Ojuera	Santa Bárbara	7,000		NA			
San José de Colinas	Santa Bárbara	18,791		NA			
San Luis	Santa Bárbara	24,606		NA			
San Marcos	Santa Bárbara	15,229		NA			
San Nicolás	Santa Bárbara	14,368		NA			
San Pedro Zacapa	Santa Bárbara	10,535		NA			
Santa Bárbara†	Santa Bárbara	41,736	30,263	+37.9%			
Santa Rita	Santa Bárbara	3,975		NA			
San Vicente Centenario	Santa Bárbara	3,601		NA			
Trinidad	Santa Bárbara	19,593		NA			
Alianza	Valle	7,491		NA			
Amapala	Valle	12,250		NA			
Aramecina	Valle	7,173		NA			
Caridad	Valle	3,927		NA			
Goascorán	Valle	14,342		NA			
Langue	Valle	20,944		NA			
Nacaome†	Valle	57,345	50,580	+13.4%			
San Francisco de Coray	Valle	9,742		NA			
San Lorenzo	Valle	41,297		NA			
Arenal	Yoro	5,949	5,139	+15.8%	169.3	35.1/km^{2}	1848
El Negrito	Yoro	45,363	37,095	+22.3%	514.2	88.2/km^{2}	1843
El Progreso	Yoro	188,366	157,188	+19.8%	536.7	351.0/km^{2}	1850
Jocón	Yoro	9,591	7,743	+23.9%	345.8	27.7/km^{2}	1791
Morazán	Yoro	40,402	34,052	+18.6%	518.3	78.0/km^{2}	1843
Olanchito	Yoro	104,609	83,749	+24.9%	2,028.2	51.6/km^{2}	1530
Santa Rita	Yoro	20,301	18,666	+8.8%	149.0	136.2/km^{2}	1684
Sulaco	Yoro	17,509	13,858	+26.3%	236.7	74.0/km^{2}	1654
Victoria	Yoro	33,019	26,678	+23.8%	795.8	41.5/km^{2}	1896
Yorito	Yoro	18,823	13,412	+40.3%	209.1	90.0/km^{2}	1889
Yoro†	Yoro	86,665	67,834	+27.8%	2,277.2	38.1/km^{2}	1852
Honduras		8,303,771	6,535,344	+27.1%		191.2/km^{2}	

== Gallery ==
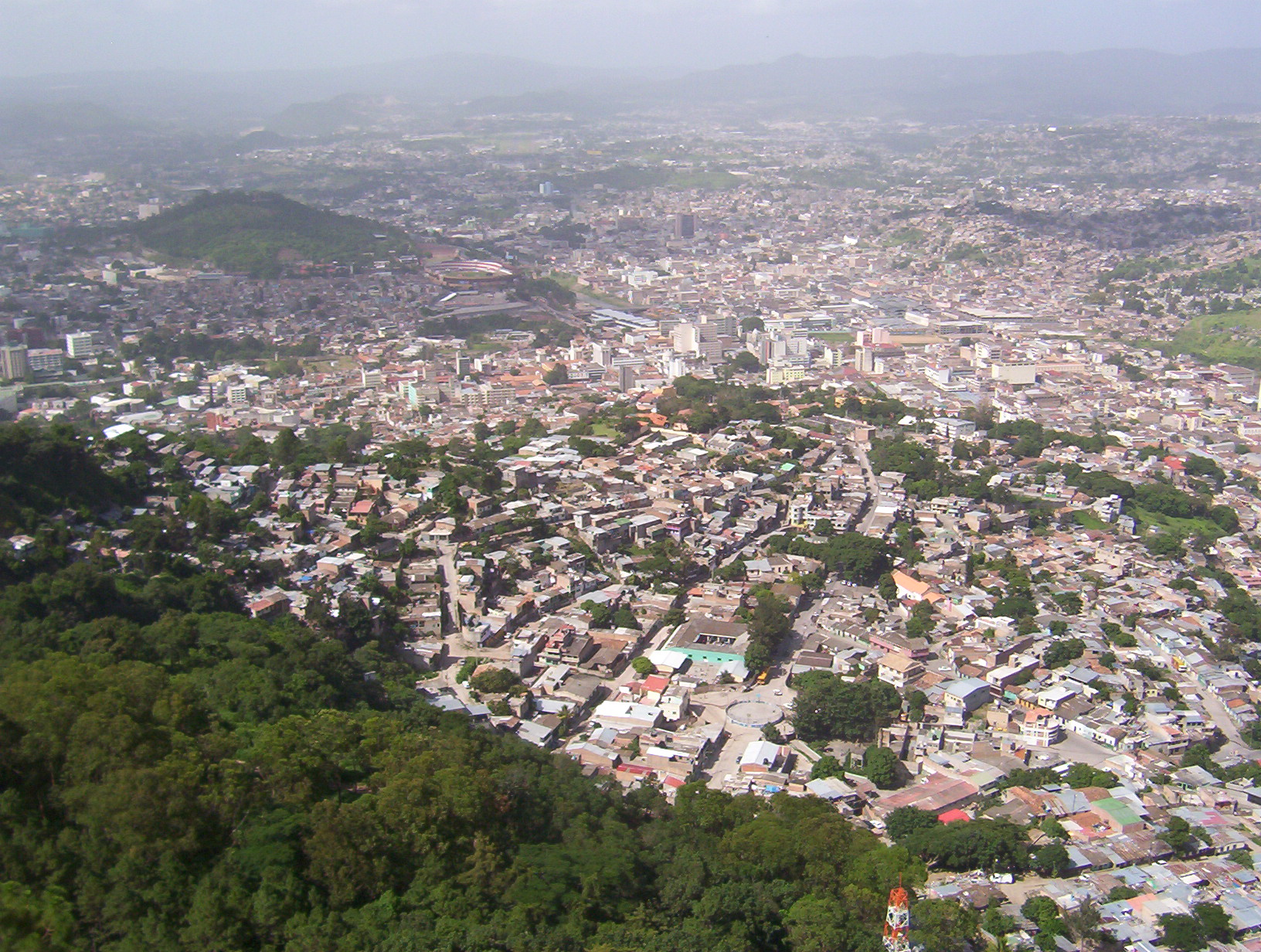
Tegucigalpa, the capital of Honduras

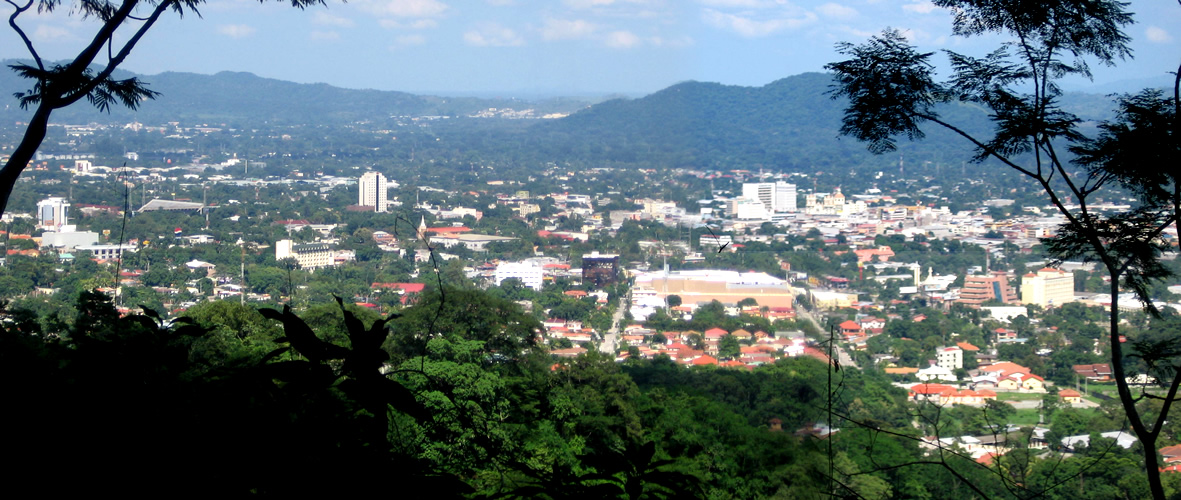
San Pedro Sula

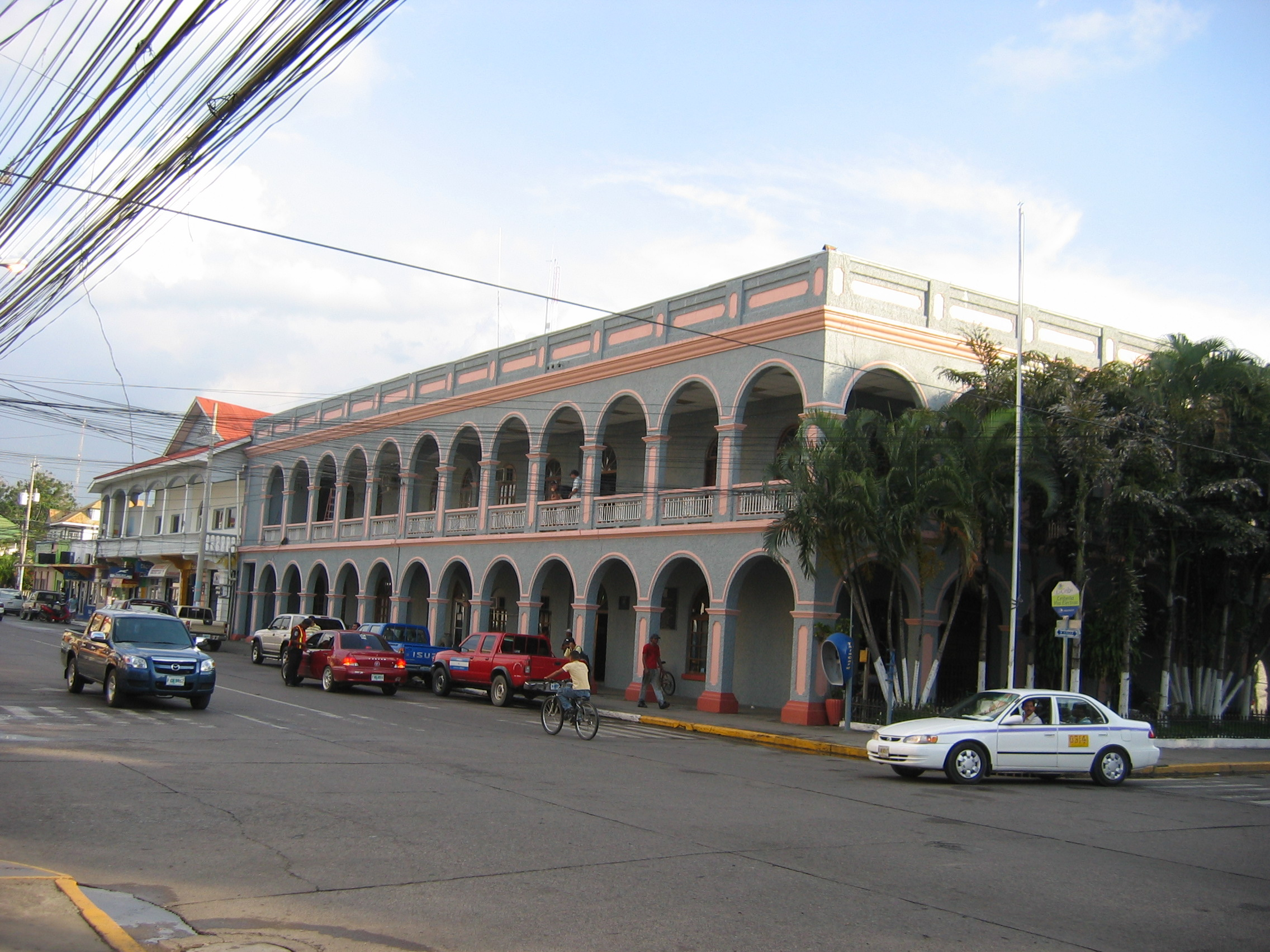
La Ceiba
