= Rio Amarillo (Mayan site) =

Archaeological site of the Mayan civilization

- Location of the site
- 14°53′22″N 89°00′11″W
- Cultures: Maya
- Location: Copán, Honduras

Rio Amarillo also known as La Castellona or La Canteada, is an archaeological site of the Mayan civilization located in the department of Copan in Honduras that dates back to the Mesoamerican classical period. The structures found reveal that it was a city of big size and that functioned as a point of passage for Mayan travelers during their journeys, although it also shows the decline of the Mayan Civilization and it was the last Mayan city in Honduran soil to be abandoned by the end of the classic period.

== Location ==
The ruins located in the Municipality of Santa Rita, department of Copan, western Honduras, approximately 20 kilometers northeast of the famous Copan Ruins, near Rio Amarillo Aerodrome.

== History ==
The site is believed to have been inhabited for the first time in ̩the 400 BC. And although from its inception important projects like houses and pyramids, they were not as large or complex as those that can be seen in the Archaeological Park of Copán or El Puente, for this reason it is affirmed that this site is an early contemporary of the pre-dynastic Copán. It is believed that this was a site of passage that the Mayas used on their way between the valleys of El Florido in Honduras and El Motagua in Guatemala, its structure has an impressive construction that provides some glimpse of the construction system applied by its ancient builders. The site reflects the sudden decline of the Mayan culture as some of the buildings are half finished. This helped archaeologists to meditate on the technique applied to obtain the perfect placement of the stones, the carving of them, the tools used, the materials to achieve their adhesion and of course the environmental impact of all this that brought about the decline of the Mayan civilization.

== Findings ==
The site has 53 structures that are organized in squares, patios and terraces. It contains some elite households, complex mound groupings, plazas sculptures and high quality stone constructions.

Around 145 burials have been found with human remains of ancient Mayan inhabitants, who due to the jewelry, clothes and other valuables found with them, are believed to have belonged to the Copán elite. Inside the underground passages you can find stucco masks that still preserve their original painting similar to the Rosalila temple.

== See also ==
- History of Honduras
