= La Ruidosa, Copán =

La Ruidosa
- Location in Honduras
- Coordinates: 15°09′N 88°36′W
- Country: Honduras
- Department: Copán

La Ruidosa is a village located in the municipality of Florida in Copán Department of northwestern Honduras. It has potable water and electric power. Coffee, maize and beans are cultivated. A stream called La Quebrada del Ruidoso is located south of the village, which gets its name from the noisy sound of the rapids in the mountain stream. The village was founded around 1920.
