= Concepción, Copán =

Concepción
- Location within Honduras
- Coordinates: 14°50′N 88°51′W
- Country: Honduras
- Department: Copán.

Area
  - Total: 74 km^{2} (29 sq mi)

Population (2015)
  - Total: 8,101
  - Density: 110/km^{2} (280/sq mi)

Concepción (Spanish pronunciation: [konseβˈsjon]) is a municipality in the Honduran department of Copán. The main town contains the church Iglesia Católica de Concepción Copán.
