= Veracruz, Honduras =

Veracruz
- Municipality
- Location in Honduras
- Coordinates: 14°55′N 88°47′W
- Country: Honduras
- Department: Copán

Area
  - Total: 32 km^{2} (12 sq mi)

Population (2015)
  - Total: 3,350
  - Density: 100/km^{2} (270/sq mi)

Veracruz (Spanish pronunciation: [beɾaˈkɾus]) is a municipality in the Honduran department of Copán.
