= San Jerónimo, Copán =

San Jerónimo
- Location in Honduras
- Coordinates: 14°58′N 88°52′W
- Country: Honduras
- Department: Copán
- Named for: Jeronimo J.Reina

Area
  - Total: 72 km^{2} (28 sq mi)

Population (2015)
  - Total: 5,072
  - Density: 70/km^{2} (180/sq mi)

San Jerónimo is a municipality in the Honduran department of Copán.
