= Cabañas, Copán =

Cabañas

- Location in Honduras
- Coordinates: 14°50′N 89°6′W
- Country: Honduras
- Department: Copán

Area
  - Total: 126 km^{2} (49 sq mi)

Population (2015)
  - Total: 14,372
  - Density: 114/km^{2} (295/sq mi)

Cabañas is a municipality in the Honduran department of Copán.
