= Trinidad de Copán =

- Location in Honduras
- Coordinates: 14°57′N 88°45′W
- Country: Honduras
- Department: Copán

Area
  - Total: 74 km^{2} (29 sq mi)

Population (2015)
  - Total: 7,031
  - Density: 95/km^{2} (250/sq mi)

Trinidad de Copán (Spanish pronunciation: [tɾiniˈðað ðe koˈpan]) is a municipality in the Honduran department of Copán. As of the 2013 census, the population is 6,865 people.
