= San José, Copán =

San José
- Location in Honduras
- Coordinates: 14°54′N 88°43′W
- Country: Honduras
- Department: Copán

Area
  - Total: 64 km^{2} (25 sq mi)

Population (2015)
  - Total: 7,090
  - Density: 110/km^{2} (290/sq mi)

San José is a municipality in the Honduran department of Copán.
