= San Juan de Opoa =

- Location in Honduras
- Coordinates: 14°47′N 88°42′W
- Country: Honduras
- Department: Copán

Area
  - Total: 77 km^{2} (30 sq mi)

Population (2015)
  - Total: 9,709
  - Density: 130/km^{2} (330/sq mi)

San Juan de Opoa is a municipality in the Honduran department of Copán.

It was one of the first villages founded by the Spaniards in 1526.
