= San Antonio, Copán =

San Antonio
- Location in Honduras
- Coordinates: 15°1′N 88°53′W
- Country: Honduras
- Department: Copán
- Founded: 1782

Government
  - Mayor: Brenda Marilyn Leiva

Area
  - Total: 119 km^{2} (46 sq mi)

Population (2015)
  - Total: 9,948
  - Density: 83.6/km^{2} (217/sq mi)

San Antonio is a municipality in the Honduran department of Copán.

== History ==
It was founded in 1782 as San Antonio del Descanso.
