= San Pedro, Honduras =

San Pedro
- Location in Honduras
- Coordinates: 14°37′N 88°52′W
- Country: Honduras
- Department: Copán

Area
  - Total: 297 km^{2} (115 sq mi)

Population (2015)
  - Total: 63,829
  - Density: 215/km^{2} (557/sq mi)

San Pedro is a municipality in the Honduran department of Copán.
