= Talgua =

- Municipality
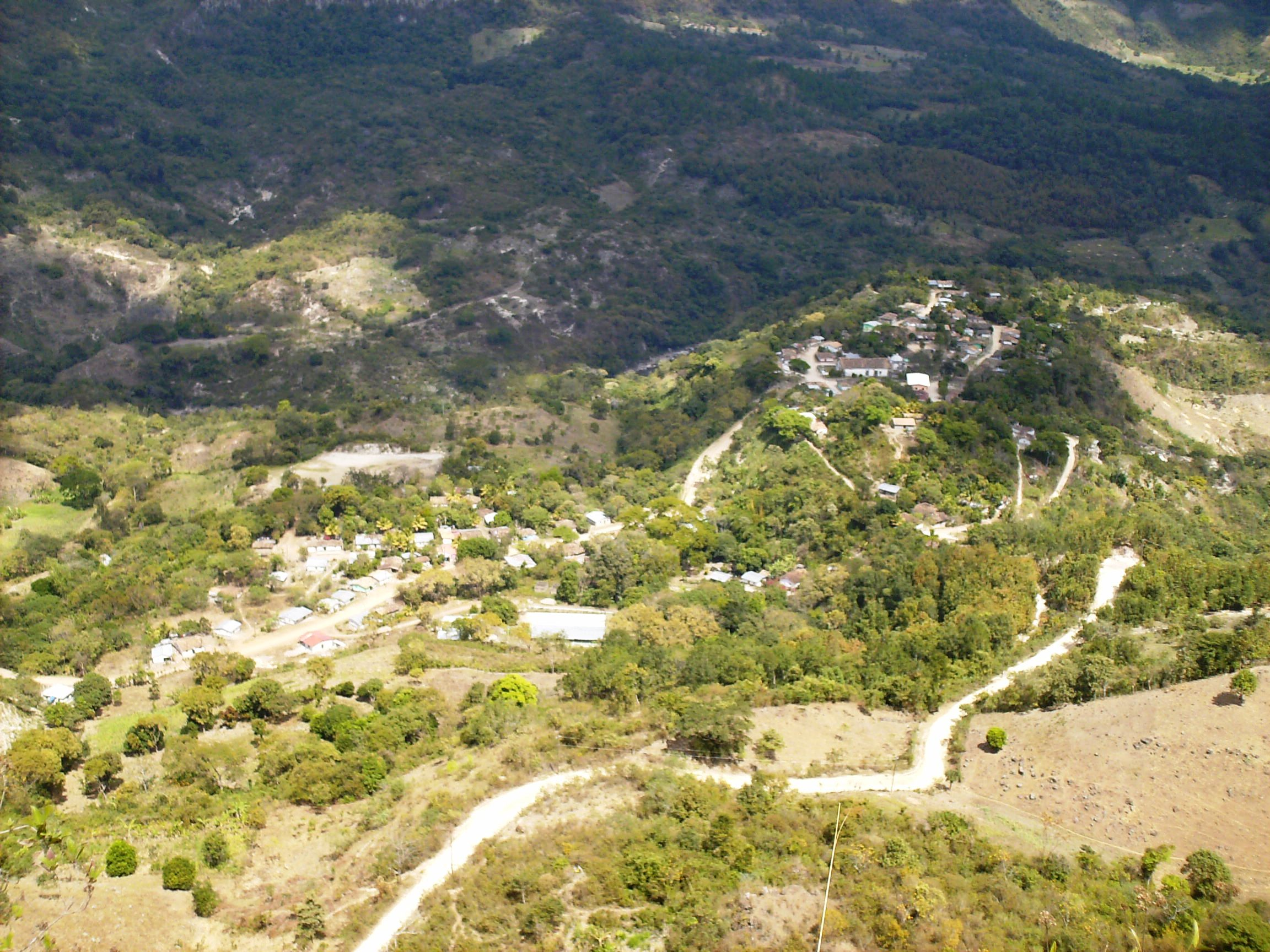
- Panoramic View of Talgua

- Location in Honduras
- Coordinates: 14°42′N 88°42′W
- Country: Honduras
- Department: Lempira

Area
  - Total: 82 km^{2} (32 sq mi)

Population (2015)
  - Total: 10,744
  - Density: 130/km^{2} (340/sq mi)

Talgua (Spanish pronunciation: [ˈtalɣwa]) is a municipality in the Honduran department of Lempira.

== History ==
Talgua was founded in the colonial period in the place called "Las Mercedes" village. Also it was known as a village where Lenca Indians dwelled, by Pedro de Alvarado and his troops. In the administration of president Ramon Villeda Morales, on January 2, 1963, the capital was moved from Talagua to San Antonio de Pedernales. The old church is preserved as a relic.

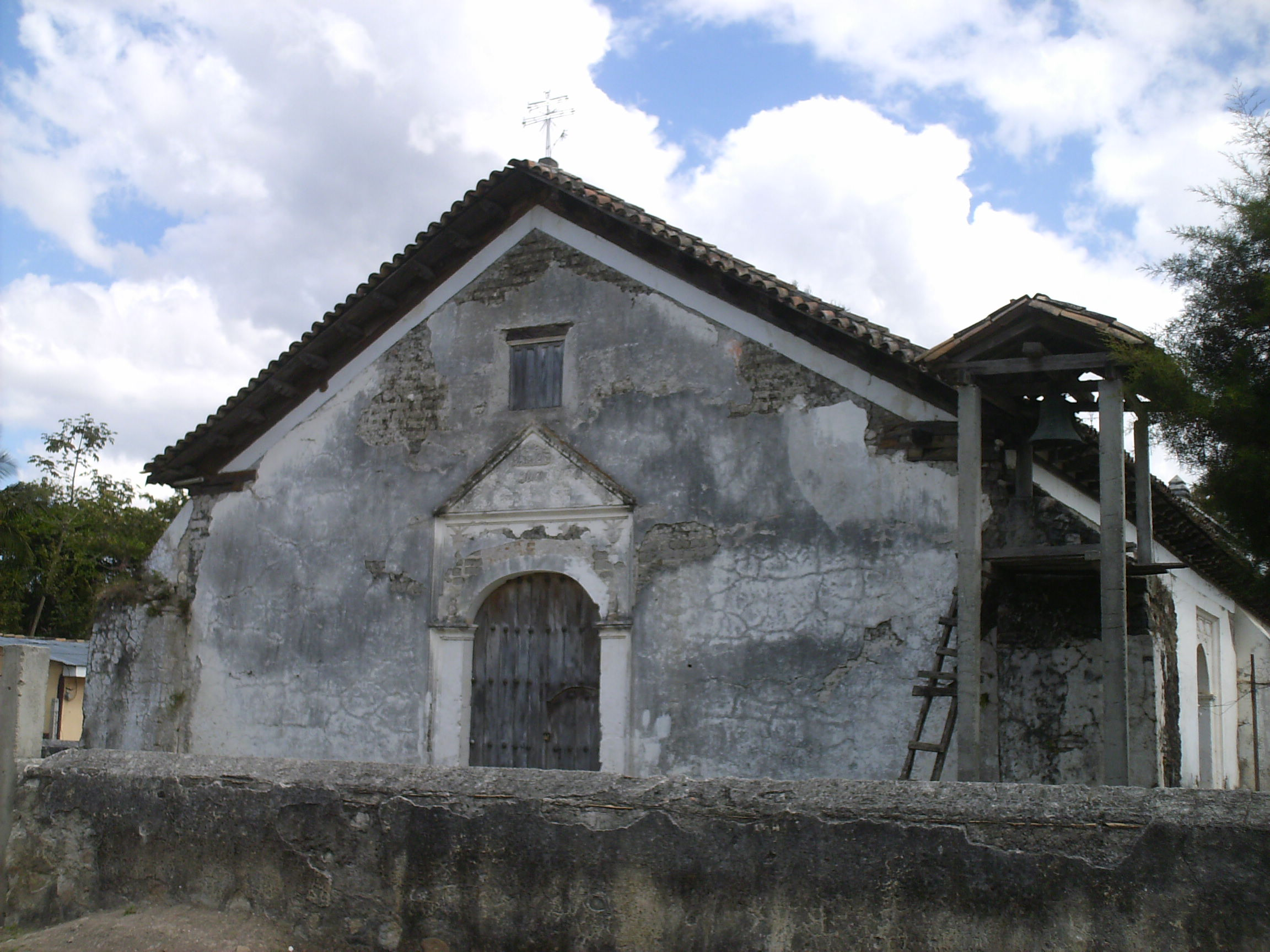
The Ancient Church

== Geography ==
It is located right on top a small hill on the side of a river. But there are high mountains around its capital and some of these belong to Copán department. The weather is hot because of the elevation from sea level and the vegetation, which consists of dry sub tropical forest. Some pine trees are seen on the highest hills.

== Boundaries ==
Its boundaries are:

- North : Copán department
- South : Las Flores municipality
- East : Las Flores municipality
- West : Copán department
- Surface Extents: 82 km^{2}

== Resources ==
Talgua is of the poorest municipalities of the department. Due to its elevation from sea level is not possible to have coffee plantations, therefore the main economic activities are beans and corn crops, followed by commerce of groceries and other home supplies. Cattle raising is for local consumption only. Since it is near a river, some people obtain aggregates for concrete from it. Also it has electricity and mobile communication coverage.

== Population ==
- Population: There were 8,399 people in 2001, and it is expected to have about 10,744 in 2015.
- Villages: 14
- Settlements: 50

=== Demographics ===
At the time of the 2013 Honduras census, Talgua municipality had a population of 10,420. Of these, 65.93% were Indigenous (65.81% Lenca), 27.12% Mestizo, 4.78% White, 2.16% Black or Afro-Honduran and 0.01% others.

== Tourism ==
- Local Holidays: "Santa Cruz" day on May 3 and "San Francisco" day on October 4.
