= Dulce Nombre =

- Location in Honduras
- Coordinates: 14°51′N 88°50′W
- Country: Honduras
- Department: Copán

Area
  - Total: 31 km^{2} (12 sq mi)

Population (2015)
  - Total: 5,961
  - Density: 190/km^{2} (500/sq mi)

Dulce Nombre (Spanish pronunciation: [ˈdulse ˈnombɾe]) is a municipality in the Honduran department of Copán.
