= San Nicolás, Copán =

- Location in Honduras
- Coordinates: 15°0′N 88°45′W
- Country: Honduras
- Department: Copán

Area
  - Total: 74 km^{2} (29 sq mi)

Population (2015)
  - Total: 7,799
  - Density: 110/km^{2} (270/sq mi)

San Nicolás is a municipality in the Honduran department of Copán.
