= La Unión, Copán =

La Unión
- Location in Honduras
- Coordinates: 14°40′N 88°54′W
- Country: Honduras
- Department: Copán

Area
  - Total: 215 km^{2} (83 sq mi)

Population (2015)
  - Total: 16,311
  - Density: 75.9/km^{2} (196/sq mi)

La Unión is a municipality in the Honduran department of Copán.
