= Santa Rita, Copán =

Santa Rita
- Location in Honduras
- Coordinates: 14°52′N 89°6′W
- Country: Honduras
- Department: Copán

Area
  - Total: 292 km^{2} (113 sq mi)

Population (2015)
  - Total: 30,683
  - Density: 105/km^{2} (272/sq mi)

Santa Rita is a municipality in the Honduran department of Copán.

== History ==
The municipality of Santa Rita is believed to have been founded in 1700, where it was then known as Aldea Cashapa. However, the area was not recognized as a municipality until 1875.

== Villages ==
A total of 31 villages are in Santa Rita:

- Santa Rita, which is head of the municipality
- Agua Caliente
- Buena Vista
- Campamento
- El Gobiado
- El Jaral
- El Mirador
- El Planón
- El Raizal
- El Rosario
- El Tamarindo
- Gotas de Sangre
- La Canteada
- La Casita
- La Libertad
- La Reforma
- La Unión Otuta
- Las Medias
- Las Mesas
- Los Achiotes
- Los Planes de La Brea
- Los Ranchos
- Minas de Piedras
- Mirasol
- Plan Grande
- Rastrojitos
- Río Amarillo
- Río Blanco
- San Jerónimo
- Tierra Fría No.1
- Tierra Fría No.2
- Vara de Cohete
