= Cucuyagua =

- Location in Honduras
- Coordinates: 14°39′N 88°52′W
- Country: Honduras
- Department: Copán

Area
  - Total: 133 km^{2} (51 sq mi)

Population (2015)
  - Total: 16,707
  - Density: 126/km^{2} (325/sq mi)

Cucuyagua (Spanish pronunciation: [kukuˈʝaɣwa]) is a municipality in the Honduran department of Copán.
