= Corquín =

- Municipality
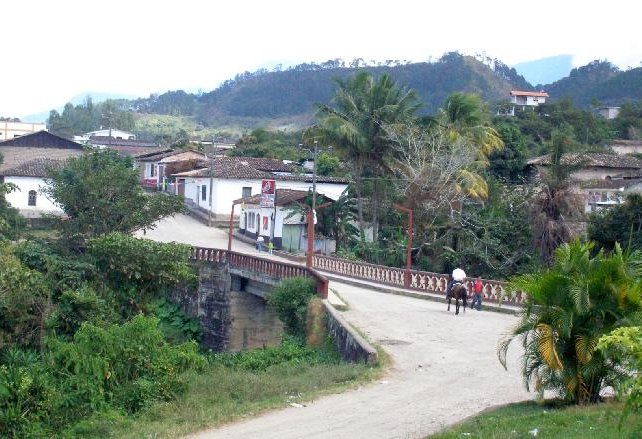

- Location in Honduras
- Coordinates: 14°34′N 88°52′W
- Country: Honduras
- Department: Copán
- City rights: 1926

Area
  - Municipality: 139 km^{2} (54 sq mi)

Population (2020 projection)
  - Municipality: 19,145
  - Density: 138/km^{2} (357/sq mi)
  - Urban: 7,109

Corquín is a town, with a population of 6,728 (2013 census), and a municipality in the Honduran department of Copán.
