= Nueva Arcadia =

- Municipality
- Location in Honduras
- Coordinates: 15°2′N 88°43′W
- Country: Honduras
- Department: Copán

Area
  - Municipality: 148 km^{2} (57 sq mi)

Population (2023 projection)
  - Municipality: 47,846
  - Density: 323/km^{2} (837/sq mi)
  - Urban: 35,385

Nueva Arcadia (Spanish pronunciation: [ˈnweβa aɾˈkaðja]) is a municipality in the Honduran department of Copán. La Entrada, with a population of 27,830 (2023 calculation), is the largest town in the municipality.
