= El Paraíso, Copán =

El Paraíso
- Municipality
- Location in Honduras
- Coordinates: 15°1′N 88°59′W
- Country: Honduras
- Department: Copán

Area
  - Municipality: 257 km^{2} (99 sq mi)

Population (2020 projection)
  - Municipality: 20,244
  - Density: 78.8/km^{2} (204/sq mi)
  - Urban: 5,632

El Paraíso (Spanish pronunciation: [el paɾaˈiso]) is a town, with a population of 5,186 (2013 census), and a municipality in the Honduran department of Copán.
