= Florida, Honduras =

Florida
- Municipality
- Location in Honduras
- Coordinates: 15°2′N 88°50′W
- Country: Honduras
- Department: Copán

Area
  - Municipality: 342 km^{2} (132 sq mi)

Population (2020 projection)
  - Municipality: 30,158
  - Density: 88.2/km^{2} (228/sq mi)
  - Urban: 7,630

Florida (Spanish pronunciation: [floˈɾiða]) is a town, with a population of 6,384 (2013 census), and a municipality in the western Honduran department of Copán.

Its products include tobacco, corn and cattle.

The feria patronal, or fair in honor of the town's patron saint, is towards the end of April when one may enjoy aubades, carreras de cintas, climbing greased poles, the coronation of the queen of the fair, rodeos, sack races, and so forth.
