= Copán Ruinas =

- Town & Municipality
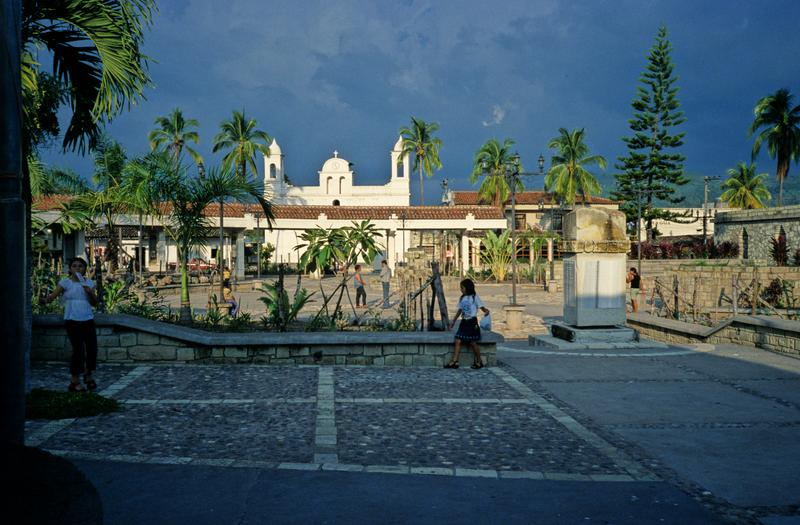
- Main Plaza in Copán Ruinas

- Flag

- Location within Honduras
- Coordinates: 14°50′N 89°09′W
- Country: Honduras
- Department: Copán

Area
  - Town & Municipality: 361 km^{2} (139 sq mi)

Population (2023 projection)
  - Town & Municipality: 45,312
  - Density: 126/km^{2} (325/sq mi)
  - Urban: 10,318
- Time zone: UTC-6 (Central America)

Copán Ruinas is a municipality in the Honduran department of Copán. The town, located close to the Guatemalan border, is a major gateway for tourists traveling to the Pre-Columbian ruins of Copán. The Copán ruins house a UN World Heritage site and are renowned for the hieroglyphic staircase, stellae, and museum.^{[a]}

== Project Honduras ==
Every year in December, the town hosts the Conference on Honduras put on by Project Honduras. The conference is an opportunity for individuals and grassroots organizations to discuss ways to improve the quality of life in Honduras through addressing the social and economic needs of the country, primarily in the areas of education, healthcare, and community building. The theme of the Conference on Honduras on 18–20 October 2012 was "Understanding the Security Situation in Honduras".

== Education ==
The town has many small language schools that offer classes for travelers. School, Guacamaya Spanish. “Guacamaya Spanish School.” Guacamaya.com, 2023, www.guacamaya.com/. Accessed 28 May 2026.

== Transport ==
The town is linked to the Honduran-Guatemalan border, approximately 20 minutes away by road to the Aduana El Florido station. Primary vehicular access is served by the CA-11 highway, which traverses the Copán River valley and functions as the critical cross-border transport corridor between western Honduras and eastern Guatemala. Copán Ruinas Airport is a civilian-use facility about 20 km east of the town center. There is no public transport network, as most transit is done by small motorized taxi-bikes or tuk tuk. Private shuttles link Copán Ruinas to Guatemala City and Antigua Guatemala, and private company buses serve daily routes to San Pedro Sula and the Honduran capital Tegucigalpa.
