= Santa Rosa de Copán =

- Municipality
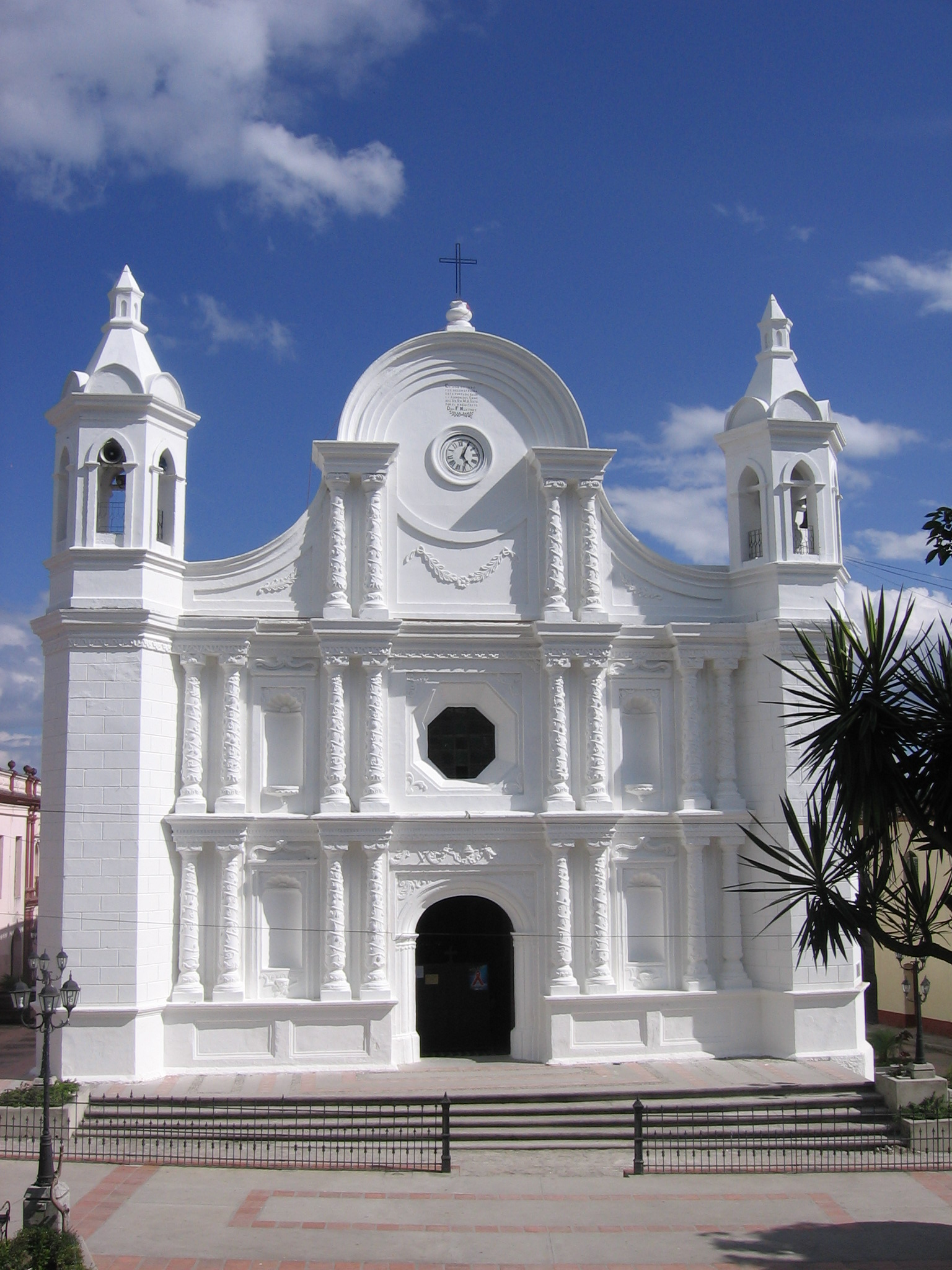
- Cathedral of Saint Rose of Copan

- Location in Honduras
- Coordinates: 14°46′N 88°47′W
- Country: Honduras
- Department: Copán
- Established as city: 12 April 1843; 183 years ago

Area
  - Total: 306 km^{2} (118 sq mi)

Population (2023 projection)
  - Total: 74,821
  - Density: 245/km^{2} (633/sq mi)
- Climate: Cwb/Cwa

Santa Rosa de Copán (Spanish pronunciation: [ˈsanta ˈrosa ðe koˈpan]) is a municipality in Honduras. The city of Santa Rosa de Copán is the municipal seat and the departmental capital of the Honduran department of Copán. It is located approximately 1,150 metres (3,773 ft) above mean sea level.

Santa Rosa de Copán is the largest and most important city in western Honduras with a population of 61,800 (2023 calculation). Santa Rosa is the governmental hub of the department of Copán. The city is connected through the International Highway of the West (CA-4) with San Pedro Sula to the North and with the borders of El Salvador at El Poy and Guatemala at Agua Caliente to the west. Santa Rosa has a subtropical climate with temperatures ranging from 25 °C (77 °F) to 29 °C (84 °F) in the summer (March–June), and from 13 °C (55 °F) to 15 °C (59 °F) in the winter (December–February).

The historical centre of Santa Rosa de Copán has been declared a Honduran national monument, with preservation of its Republican or Neoclassical architecture and cobblestone streets that has its origins in a prosperous tobacco farming industry of the 18th century. Santa Rosa is situated at a strategic point between Copán Ruinas and Gracias, Lempira and the Celaque National Park. As before, tobacco farming remains a staple of the local economy, particularly the cultivation of premium cigar tobaccos. The La Flor de Copán cigar factory is located in the city.

== History ==
The town was founded in the early 18th century. On 8 August 1705, the Spanish colonial captain Don Juan García de la Candelaria acquired the area then called "Los Llanos" from the Spanish crown and founded his estate with four ranches, later the first settlers named it Santa Rosa, and later Santa Rosa de Los Llanos. A tobacco industry developed in the early 18th Century and in 1765 the town was picked as the site for La Real Factoria del Tabacos, the Royal Tobacco Company, a Spanish crown company. Later, the Gracias a Dios Department was split in two departments, becoming Copán department and Lempira department.

The town was on various occasions the capital of the State of Honduras. On 7 May 1862 the nation's President Don Victoriano Castellanos Cortes, issued Legislative Decree No. 3, giving the country the title of "Republic of Honduras" instead of "State of Honduras." In 1865, the town was renamed Santa Rosa de Copán.

Its Catedral de Santa Rosa, dedicated to Saint Rosa, is the cathedral episcopal see of the Roman Catholic Diocese of Santa Rosa de Copán (established on 1916.02.02).

== Climate ==
Under the Köppen climate classification, Santa Rosa has a monsoon humid subtropical climate (Cwa). Temperatures are relatively consistent year throughout the course of the year and the town is not as hot as other locations in the tropics because of its altitude. Like other locations with this climate, there is a pronounced drier season during the “winter” months. The location sees on average roughly 1500mm of precipitation annually.

Climate data for Santa Rosa, Honduras
Month	Jan	Feb	Mar	Apr	May	Jun	Jul	Aug	Sep	Oct	Nov	Dec	Year
Record high °C (°F)	27.6 (81.7)	29.7 (85.5)	32.1 (89.8)	32.3 (90.1)	31.8 (89.2)	29.3 (84.7)	27.3 (81.1)	27.6 (81.7)	28.2 (82.8)	27.3 (81.1)	27.3 (81.1)	26.9 (80.4)	32.3 (90.1)
Mean daily maximum °C (°F)	22.1 (71.8)	23.9 (75.0)	26.5 (79.7)	28.1 (82.6)	28.1 (82.6)	26.6 (79.9)	25.5 (77.9)	25.8 (78.4)	25.7 (78.3)	24.1 (75.4)	22.7 (72.9)	21.9 (71.4)	25.1 (77.2)
Daily mean °C (°F)	17.6 (63.7)	18.4 (65.1)	20.4 (68.7)	21.5 (70.7)	23.0 (73.4)	21.5 (70.7)	21.0 (69.8)	21.2 (70.2)	21.0 (69.8)	19.9 (67.8)	18.7 (65.7)	17.9 (64.2)	20.2 (68.3)
Mean daily minimum °C (°F)	13.3 (55.9)	12.9 (55.2)	13.8 (56.8)	15.0 (59.0)	16.2 (61.2)	17.4 (63.3)	17.0 (62.6)	17.1 (62.8)	17.2 (63.0)	16.4 (61.5)	15.0 (59.0)	13.9 (57.0)	15.4 (59.7)
Record low °C (°F)	8.0 (46.4)	7.9 (46.2)	8.8 (47.8)	9.9 (49.8)	11.2 (52.2)	14.8 (58.6)	14.5 (58.1)	14.5 (58.1)	14.5 (58.1)	12.3 (54.1)	10.1 (50.2)	8.6 (47.5)	7.9 (46.2)
Average precipitation mm (inches)	39.9 (1.57)	29.2 (1.15)	24.1 (0.95)	43.6 (1.72)	153.5 (6.04)	288.4 (11.35)	210.7 (8.30)	215.8 (8.50)	295.6 (11.64)	145.1 (5.71)	76.3 (3.00)	58.4 (2.30)	1,580.6 (62.23)
Average precipitation days (≥ 1.0 mm)	6	5	3	4	9	16	15	15	16	12	9	8	118
Source: NOAA

== Sports ==
Football club Deportes Savio has been playing in the Honduran National league since 2007 and play their home matches at the Estadio Sergio Antonio Reyes.

== Bibliography ==
- Urquía Fuentes, José Leonardo. History de Santa Rosa de Copán, "Los Llanos", (chronological historical essay) 2010.
