= Copán Department =

Copán
- Department
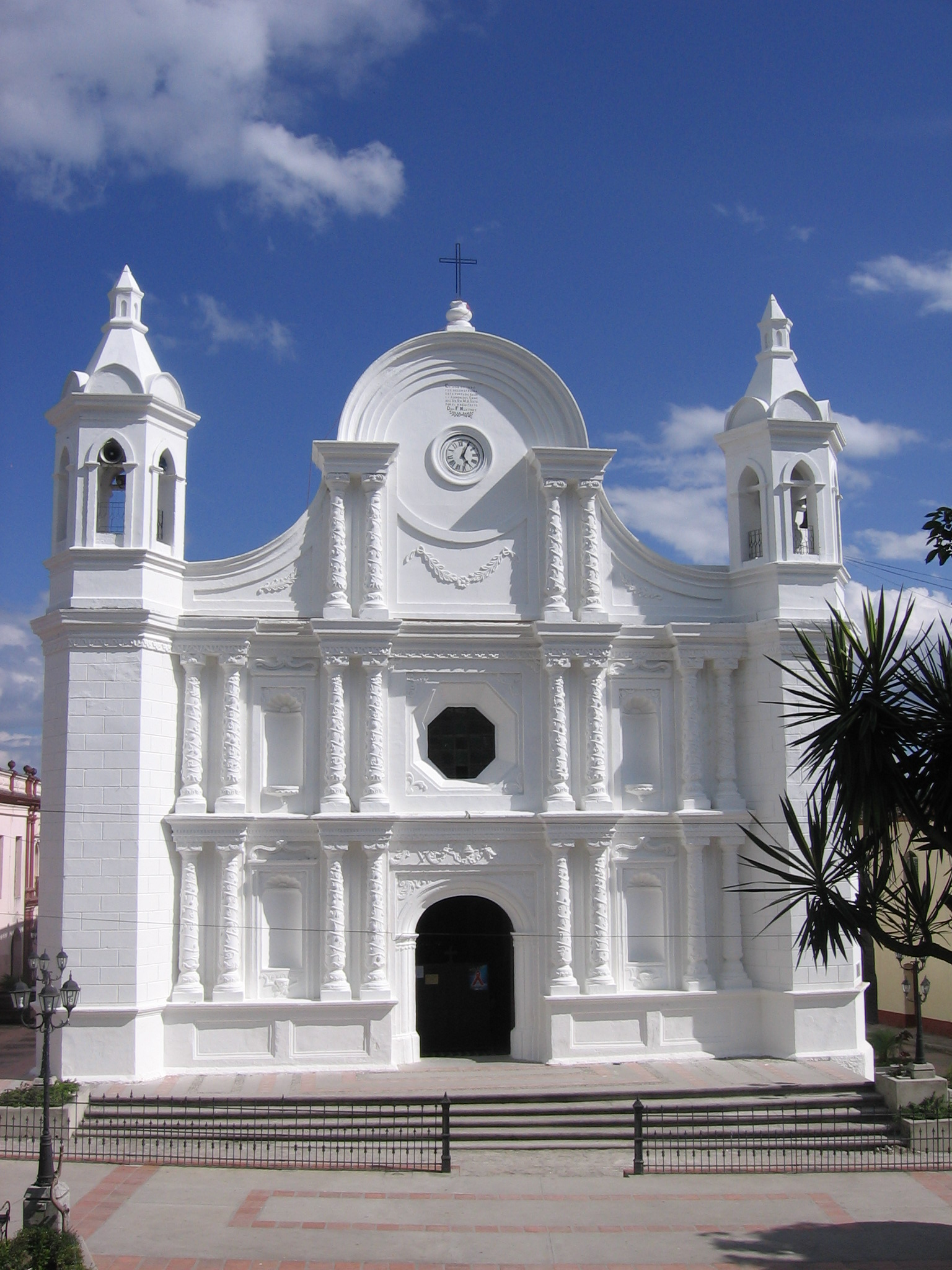
- Cathedral of Santa Rosa

- Flag Coat of arms

- Coordinates: 14°46′N 88°47′W
- Country: Honduras
- Municipalities: 23
- Villages: 337
- Founded: 28 May 1869
- Seat: Santa Rosa de Copán

Government
  - Type: Departmental
  - Governor: Juana Barrera, LibRe 2022-2026

Area
  - Total: 3,239 km^{2} (1,251 sq mi)

Population (2015)
  - Total: 382,722
  - Density: 118.2/km^{2} (306.0/sq mi)

GDP (Nominal, 2015 US dollar)
  - Total: $1.1 billion (2023)
  - Per capita: $2,300 (2023)

GDP (PPP, 2015 int. dollar)
  - Total: $2.2 billion (2023)
  - Per capita: $4,700 (2023)
- Time zone: UTC-6 (CDT)
- Postal code: 41101, 41202
- ISO 3166 code: HN-CP
- HDI (2021): 0.572 medium · 15th of 18
- Statistics derived from Consult INE online database: Population and Housing Census 2013

Copán is one of the departments in the western part of Honduras. The departmental capital is the town of Santa Rosa de Copán. The department is well known for its tobacco and fine cigars.

The department is famous for its Pre-Columbian archaeological site at Copán, one of the greatest cities of the Maya civilization.

== Etymology ==
The name "Copán" is from the Mayan Ch'orti' language.

== Location ==
Santa Rosa de Copan, a city located in the mountainous northwestern part of Honduras, is situated 3,806 feet above sea level, near the Higuito River, between Copan Ruinas and Gracias.The department of Copán covers a total surface area of 3,242 km^{2} (1,252 sq mi).

== Population ==
The actual population in Santa Rosa de Copan is 61,818 people, having a male ratio of 29,402 (47.6%) and a female ratio of 32,416 (52.4%).

== History ==
The territory that today is the department of Copán was inhabited by both the Chʼortiʼ Maya in the west (around Copán Ruinas) and north and the Lenca in the extreme south. The archaeological site of Copán is considered very important to the study of Maya civilization. Onomastic studies suggest that the valleys of Cucuyagua, Florida and La Venta were mainly inhabited by Lencas (referred to as Chontal) in the sixteenth century, though they may have been home to populations of Chʼortiʼ Maya during the classic period.

The name "Copán" is due to the chief Copán Galel, a warrior who defended his lands before the Spanish colonization. This territory was within the jurisdiction of the colonial city of Gracias a Dios and until May 28, 1869, it was within the jurisdiction of the department of Lempira. On that date it was officially created as the Department of Copán and the city of Santa Rosa de Copán was named as the capital, during the administration of Captain General Don José María Medina.

== Geography ==
The Department of Copán is a geographically mountainous area, its main source of income is tourism to the Mayan archaeological sites, followed by the cultivation and production of coffee, tobacco, livestock, agriculture of vegetables and basic grains, production of articles in leather or saddlery, industrial products, etc.

== Economy ==
Honduras' GDP increased by 3.6% in 2024; however, there is a slowdown of the GDP from 2.8% to 3.4% between 2025 and 2026. This is due because of remittances, an increase in inflation, and the deceleration of credit expansion.

== Municipalities ==
1. Cabañas
2. Concepción
3. Copán Ruinas
4. Corquín
5. Cucuyagua
6. Dolores
7. Dulce Nombre
8. El Paraíso
9. Florida
10. La Jigua
11. La Unión
12. Nueva Arcadia
13. San Agustín
14. San Antonio
15. San Jerónimo
16. San José
17. San Juan de Opoa
18. San Nicolás
19. San Pedro
20. Santa Rita
21. Santa Rosa de Copán
22. Trinidad de Copán
23. Veracruz
