= List of Honduras-related topics =

The location of the Republic of Honduras

The following is an outline of topics related to the Republic of Honduras.

== Honduras ==
- Honduras
- Culture of Honduras
- Demographics of Honduras
- Departments of Honduras
- Economy of Honduras
- Geography of Honduras
- History of Honduras
- ISO 3166-1 alpha-2 country code for Honduras: HN
- ISO 3166-1 alpha-3 country code for Honduras: HND
- ISO 3166-2:HN region codes for Honduras
- Music of Honduras
- Rivers of Honduras
- Human rights in Honduras

== Politics ==
- Politics of Honduras
- President of Honduras
- List of political parties in Honduras
- Elections in Honduras
- Liberalism in Honduras
- Communications in Honduras
- Transportation in Honduras
- West-Wind (Honduran Presidential Plane)
- Flag of Honduras
- Foreign relations of Honduras
- 2009 Honduran constitutional crisis
- Arnoldo José Avilés García

== Military ==
- Military of Honduras
- 2009 Honduran coup d'état
- Football War

== List of famous Hondurans ==
- Óscar Acosta
- Elvia Alvarado
- Oscar Álvarez, former Minister of Security
- Ramón Amaya Amador
- Eduardo Bähr
- Augusto Coello
- Argentina Díaz Lozano
- Julio Escoto
- America Ferrera, American actress of Honduran origin
- Lucila Gamero de Medina
- Alfonso Guillén Zelaya
- Porfirio Lobo, President of Honduras
- Ricardo Maduro, former President of Honduras
- Carlos Mencia (American comedian born in San Pedro Sula)
- El Menor Menor, Honduran Singer from La Ceiba
- Juan Ramón Molina
- Sir Salvador Moncada
- Visitación Padilla
- Carlos Pavón, former professional footballer.
- Satcha Pretto
- Carlos Roberto Reina
- Óscar Andrés Rodríguez Maradiaga
- Ramón Rosa
- Neida Sandoval (born in Minas de Oro)
- Roberto Sosa (poet)
- Clementina Suárez
- Froylán Turcios
- Hype Williams, music video and film director
- José Zúñiga, Actor

== Cities and important towns and places ==
- Tegucigalpa (Capital)
- Chamelecón
- Choluteca
- Comayagua
- Danlí
- El Progreso
- Gracias
- Guanaja
- Juticalpa
- La Ceiba
- La Esperanza
- La Mosquitia
- Nueva Ocotepeque
- Minas de Oro
- Omoa
- Puerto Castilla
- Puerto Cortés
- Puerto Lempira
- Roatán
- Sambo Creek
- San Pedro Sula
- Santa Rosa de Copán
- Siguatepeque
- Tela
- Tocoa
- Trujillo

== Football (soccer) ==
- Liga Profesional de Honduras
- Hispano FC
- C.D. Platense
- Universidad NAH
- Municipal Valencia
- C.D. Victoria
- C.D. Vida
- Liga de Ascenso Honduras
- C.D. Arsenal
- Social Sol
- Deportes Savio
- Atlético Olanchano
- Motagua Reservas
- Juticalpa Tulin
- Olimpia Reservas
- C.D. Federal
- Honduras Salzburg
- Honduras05-06apertura
- Honduras04-05clausura
- Honduras04-05apertura
- Honduras03-04clausura
- Honduras03-04apertura
- Honduras 02-03 clausura
- Edgar Álvarez
- Víctor Coello
- Estadio Olímpico Metropolitano

== Ancient cities and important ruins ==
- Cerro Palenque
- Copán
- La Travesía

== Other geographic features ==
- Bay Islands
- Caribbean Sea
- Gulf of Fonseca
- Gulf of Honduras
- Lake Yojoa
- Mosquito Coast
- Pacific Ocean

== Administrative subdivisions ==
- Atlántida (department)
- Choluteca (department)
- Colón (department)
- Comayagua (department)
- Copán (department)
- Cortés (department)
- El Paraíso (department)
- Francisco Morazán (department)
- Gracias a Dios (department)
- Intibucá (department)
- Islas de la Bahía (department)
- La Paz (Honduran department)
- Lempira (department)
- Ocotepeque (department)
- Olancho (department)
- Santa Bárbara (department)
- Valle (department)
- Yoro (department)

== Other ==
- Adjacent countries:

El Salvador
Guatemala
Nicaragua

- .hn Internet country code top-level domain for Honduras
- Football War
- Contras
- Hurricane Mitch
- Virgin of Suyapa
- United Provinces of Central America

== See also ==
- List of Central America-related topics
- List of international rankings
- Lists of country-related topics
