= Minas de Oro =

- Location within Honduras
- Coordinates: 14°48′0″N 87°21′15″W
- Country: Honduras
- Department: Comayagua

Area
  - Total: 390 km^{2} (150 sq mi)
- Elevation: 1,060 m (3,480 ft)

Population (2015)
  - Total: 13,341
  - Density: 34/km^{2} (89/sq mi)
- Area code: 27
- Website: www.minasdeoro.info

Minas de Oro is a municipality in the Honduran department of Comayagua.

== Geography ==
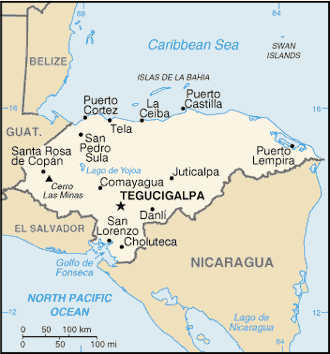
A map of Honduras.

Minas de Oro is located to the northeast of Comayagua, 150 km to the northwest of Tegucigalpa, the capital of Honduras. It is surround by the mountains named Grande, El Cobre and El Peñón. To the north, the district of Victoria; to the south, the San Luis and Esquías districts; to the east, the San Jose del Potero district and to the west, the La Libertad district.

A map of Minas de Oro in Honduras.

== Historical information ==
Minas de Oro was founded as a consequence of the gold rushes that were common in the region, when workers and neighbours settled in the area. During one of his visits to this place, Juan Lindo discovered a gold mine. For that reason it has continued to be called "Minas de Oro" (Gold Mines).

During Dr. Policarpo Bonillas's administration, citizenship began negotiating with the Círculo de Cabañas, an association that grouped the municipalities of Minas de Oro, Esquías and San José del Potrero. These negotiations led to the transfer of the head of such association to Minas de Oro in 1893, during general Domingo Vazquez's administration. To justify the transfer, the citizenship argued that the powerful increment of the footwear industry, the commercial relationship between Minas de Oro, Tegucigalpa and the northern coast, and the growing café crops in the region were becoming Minas de Oro's main patrimonies, which at least in the first case it held true in the subsequent years.

== Education ==
=== City of education ===
In the 1990s, Minas de Oro was called a "city of education" in Honduras because it was the only municipality where all the towns had access to a primary education.

=== The Malcotal ===
Minas de Oro counted on the Malcotal School, oriented to the agroforestal formation led by a North American. The only thing left of this institution is a house turned centre of tourist retirements in the highway that leads to Mines of San Antonio.

=== Evangelical Boarding School ===
Minas de Oro were counted by the decade from the 1960s to 1990s in the Famous Evangelical Institute that has a boarding school where students from all of the republic of Honduras went. Its musical, English formation and Biblical education was recognised. At the beginning of the 1960s, it closed because of stoked heat from the insecurity in the access routes, stop cost of fuels, local competition, and complexity in the administrative handling of this type of institution.

=== Minas de Oro Regional Institute ===
Villages near to Minas de Oro and Mal Paso

Villages near to Minas de Oro and Minas de San Antonio

Villages near to Hoya de la Puerta

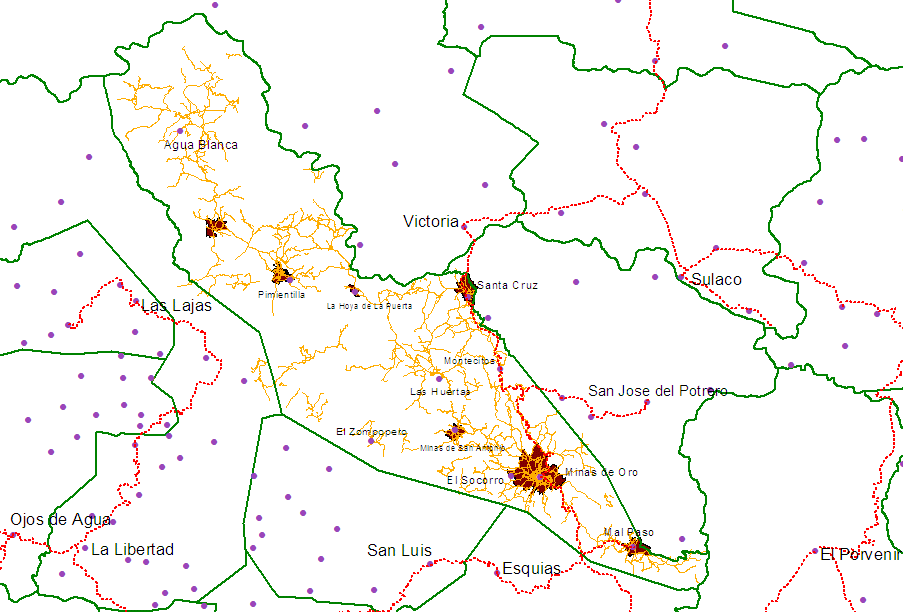
Map of the aldeas

The town Minas de Oro

== List of villages ==
- 031101 Minas de Oro
- 031102 Agua Blanca
- 031103 El Socorro
- 031104 El Zompopero
- 031105 La Hoya de la Puerta
- 031106 Las Huertas
- 031107 Minas de San Antonio
- 031108 Montecitos
- 031109 Pimientilla
- 031110 San Isidro del Mal Paso
- 031111 Santa Cruz

== List of caserios ==
- Quebrachal
- La Piedra
- La Joya de Mulas
- El Salitre
- La Canada
- Los Pozos
- Palo de Agua
- Mal Paso
- Las Lomitas
- Las Majadas
- El Filo
- El Carrizalito
- La Laguna
- La Florida
- La Rosita
- Hoya del Blanco
- Lagunitas
- Joya del Blanco
- Hacienda Vallecillos
- San Jose del Coyolar
- Casitas
- El Carao
- El Chorro
- El Barro
- El Paraiso
- Italia
- Majada
- El Cacao
- Platanares
- Majada de Trino
- Maguelito
- La Laguna
- Canquigue
- Potrerillos
- La Tejera
- Cofradia
- La Ceiba
- Jupuare
- El Salitre
- Ojo de Agua o Pozo Zarco
- El Palote
- Las Cruces
- Cristales
- Mal Paso
- Terrero Colorado
- Cerro El Sombrero
- Pedernales
- El Tablon
- Las Ventanas
- El Zapote
- Pie de La Cuesta
- El Bijao
- El Pataste
- Los Chaguites
- El Higuerito
- Piedra Ancha
- Corralitos
- Las Pinuelas
- El Caliche
- Nicaraguita
- Montanuela
- La Granadilla
- Iran
- El Peñon
- El Socorro
- Nueva York
- La Marihuana
- Rio Colorado
- Patastillo
- La Chacara
- El Agua Caliente
- El Guarumal
- Tontales
- Casas Viejas
- La Peña
- Hacienda El Roble
- El Trozo
- Lava Oro
- La Pimienta
- Jicarito
- Ojo de Agua

== Notable people ==
- Neida Sandoval – A host of the morning show Despierta America on the Spanish language network Univision.
- Vicente Cáceres – teacher in one of the largest public schools of Honduras.
- Ramón Carías Donaire – teacher, principal of the Villa Ahumada Normal School.
- José María Calix – journalist

== Sites of interest ==
- Cerro Pelon – A mountain to the north of the city that is named after its lack of large trees. Only desert plants like cacti, small palms and bushes grow. There are also many caves that make popular tourist attractions. This site is also known as Cerro Grande (Large Hill) or Cacalotepe in some geography books. Over the top there is a point of the first order geodetic net.
- Evangelical Institute installations
- El Malcotal installations
- El Manantial Ecocenter
- Cerro Los Tornillos
- Some closed mines
