= Humuya =

- Municipality
- Location within Honduras
- Coordinates: 14°15′N 87°40′W
- Country: Honduras
- Department: Comayagua

Area
  - Total: 54.19 km^{2} (20.92 sq mi)

Population (2013)
  - Total: 1,319
  - Density: 24.34/km^{2} (63.04/sq mi)

Humuya (Spanish pronunciation: [uˈmuʝa]) is a municipality in the department of Comayagua in Honduras. It covers an area of 54.19 km^{2} (20.92 sq mi) and had a population of 1,319 inhabitants according to the 2013 census.

== History ==
The settlement was originally known as the village of Tambla, which was inhabited by indigenous natives. "Tambla" literally means "abundance of corn". It later became part of the municipality of San Sebastian in 1896. On 26 January 1897, it was elevated to the rank of municipality, and was given the name "Humuya", which means "place of two waters" in the Mayan language.

== Geography ==
Humuya is located in the department of Comayagua in Honduras. It borders the municipalities of Cane to the south, Lamaní to the east, and San Sebastian to the west. The municipality covers an area of 54.19 km^{2} (20.92 sq mi). The Naranjo, El Cacalote, and Los Cerritos mountains surround the municipality, and the aldea of Humuya, the municipal seat, is located in the northeastern part of the municipality.

Humuya has a tropical monsoon climate (Köppen climate classification: Am). The municipality has an average annual temperature of 22.76 °C (72.97 °F) and typically receives about 263.35 mm (10.368 in) of annual precipitation.

== Administrative divisions ==
The municipality comprises three aldeas (villages) and their associated caseríos (hamlets).

Aldeas of Humuya
| Aldea | Total Population | Men | Women |
|---|---|---|---|
| Humuya | 739 | 367 | 372 |
| El Junquillo | 462 | 235 | 227 |
| Travesía | 118 | 64 | 54 |
| Total | 1,319 | 666 | 653 |

== Demographics ==
According to the 2013 census, Humuya had a total population of 1,319 inhabitants, of whom 666 (50.5%) were men and 653 (49.5%) were women. The entire population was classified as rural.

By broad age group, 414 individuals (31.4%) were aged 0–14 years, 803 individuals (60.9%) were aged 15–64, and 102 individuals (7.7%) were aged 65 years and over. The median age was 23.9 years and the mean age was 28.6 years. Among the population aged 15 and over, the municipality recorded an illiteracy rate of 14.3%, lower than the departmental average of 14.6%. The municipality had 310 occupied private dwellings, with an average of 4.2 persons per occupied dwelling.
