= Duyure =

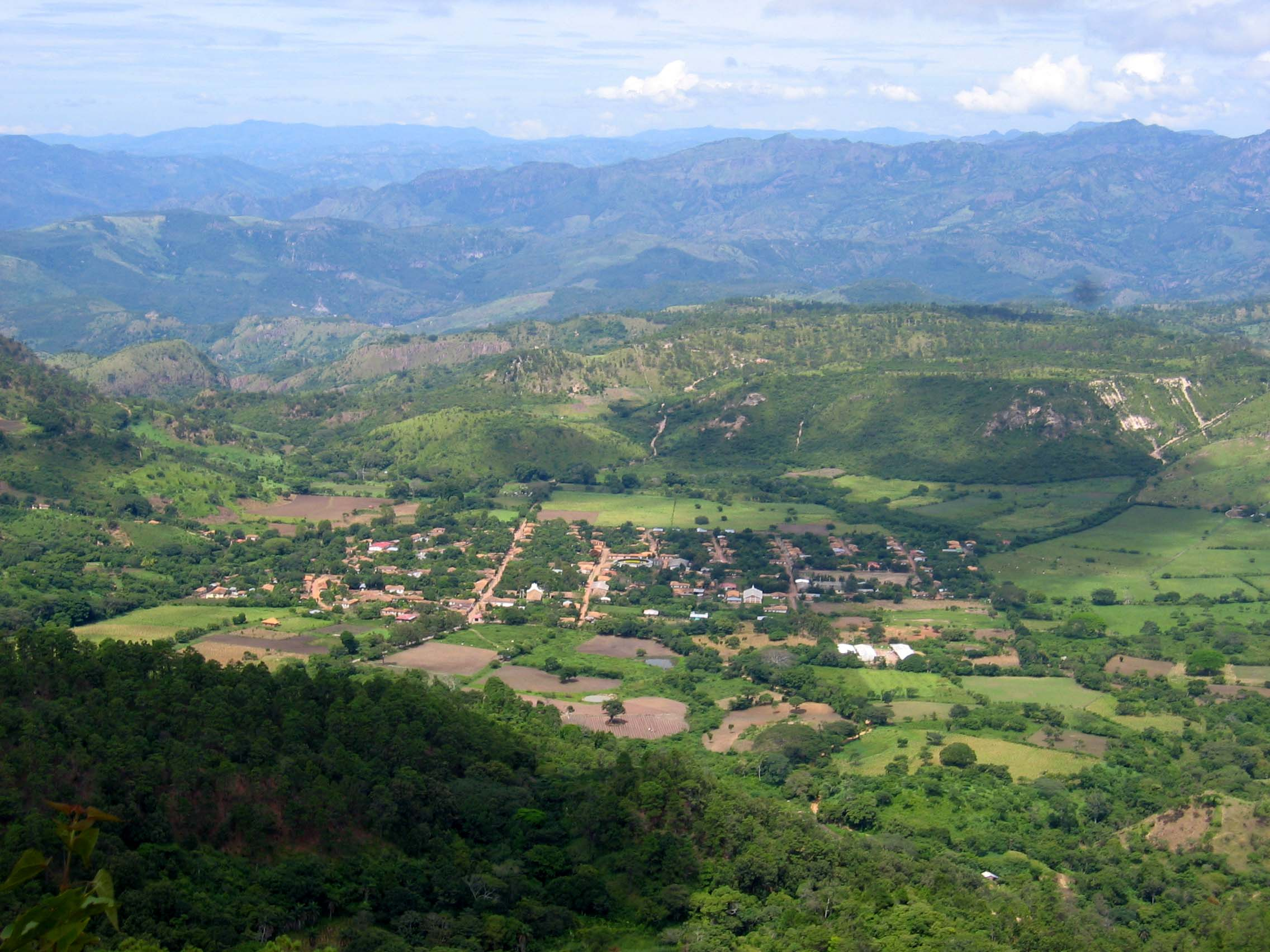
- Photograph of Duyure from above.

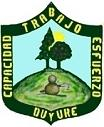
- Seal
- Nickname: Creek of the Coyotes
- Location in Honduras
- Coordinates: 13°38′N 86°49′W
- Country: Honduras
- Department: Choluteca
- Municipality: Duyure

Government
  - Mayor: Celfida Amada Bustillo Cerna

Population (2013)
  - Total: 3,519

Duyure is a municipality located in the Honduran department of Choluteca.

The municipality borders Nicaragua to the east, the department of El Paraíso to the north, the municipality of Morolica to the west, and the municipality of San Marcos de Colón to the south. The Choluteca River runs along the northern and western limits of the municipality. The town center is located 32 kilometers North of the city of San Marcos de Colón via a dirt road connected to the Pan-American Highway.

Located in the center of the municipality is the town center which is surrounded by seven satellite villages and several small housing clusters. The seven satellite villages located outside of the urban center are named: Apasupo, Liraqui, Tierras Coloradas, Carrizal Prieto, El Horno, Alto Pino, and San Lorenzo. Each village contains a public school that educates children ranging from kindergarten to sixth grade. The town center has both a primary school and a high school.

== History ==
Duyure used to be called Valle de la Soledad. In the 1895 Honduran national census it was register as a municipality.

== Town center ==
In the center of Duyure stands a large Guanacaste tree which serves as a centerpiece for the town's grassy Central Park. Several large trees, from Acacia to Tamarind, can be found throughout the park. Town Hall faces Central Park from the north side of the park and is located adjacent to the town's only Pool Hall. To the east side of the park stands the Catholic church. The church is rumored to have been constructed during the 19th century, although the interior of the structure underwent renovation in 2008. Neighboring the Catholic church sits the local computer center, formally known as the "Community Center for Knowledge and Communication" (CCCC). Located to the west side of the park is the Health Center (CESAMO) and the town Kindergarten.

== Transportation ==
To date, the only available public transportation is a 1.5-hour-long bus ride to San Marcos de Colón. The bus leaves from Duyure for San Marcos de Colón at 6:00 AM and returns to Duyure from San Marcos de Colón at 3:30 PM daily.

== Demographics ==
According to the 2013 census, 78% of the population work in agriculture. Fifty-one percent of people uses the public water system and 66% uses the public electricity system. Ninety-five percent uses firewood for cooking and 6% of houses has at least one car. Fifty-seven percent of duyure has a basic education system.

Historical Population
Year	Population	%+	%+ Yearly
1887	505		
1901	712	41.0	2.9
1905	664	-6.7	-1.7
1910	831	25.2	5.0
1926	767	-7.7	-0.5
1930	1,600	108.6	27.2
1935	1,054	-34.1	-6.8
1940	979	-7.1	-1.4
1945	1,229	25.5	5.1
1950	1,415	15.1	3.0
1961	1,445	2.1	0.2
1974	1,687	16.7	1.3
1988	2,668	58.2	4.2
2001	2,753	3.2	0.2
2013	3,519	27.8	2.3
2018 (est.)	3,547	0.8	0.2

== Geography ==
Duyure has 5 villages (aldeas) and 57 hamlets. List of villages:

- Duyure
- Arado Grande
- El Carrizal Prieto
- El Horno
- Liraqui
- Tierra Colorada
