= Cuevas de Taulabé =

Cave system in Honduras

Taulabé Caves are part of a natural cave system that spreads throughout the municipality of Taulabé, in the Honduran department of Comayagua.

The speleafer (a geologic formation with significant cave development) in Honduras is a limestone vault of Cenomanian age (earliest Late Cretaceous) named the Jaitique Formation (“high-TEE-kay”). It is very similar in outcrop appearance to the Atima limestone (generally consisting of thick-bedded grey micrite), but it does not achieve the thicknesses common to the Atima, probably never exceeding 250 metres (820 ft) thickness, more commonly around 100 meters. The only partially mapped caves extends at least 921 meters.
