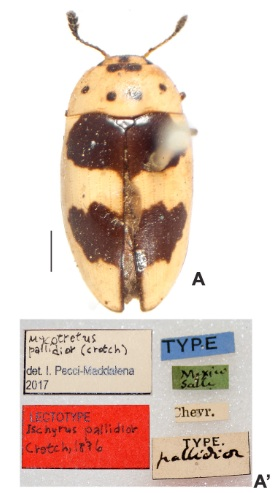
- Type specimen with its collection labels

Scientific classification
- Kingdom: Animalia
- Phylum: Arthropoda
- Clade: Pancrustacea
- Class: Insecta
- Order: Coleoptera
- Suborder: Polyphaga
- Infraorder: Cucujiformia
- Family: Erotylidae
- Genus: Mycotretus
- Species: M. pallidior

Binomial name
- Mycotretus pallidior (Crotch, 1876)

Synonyms
- Ischyrus pallidior Crotch, 1876; Mycotretus nigrotinctus Crotch, 1876

= Mycotretus pallidior =

Species of beetle

Mycotretus pallidior is a Central American beetle species in the pleasing fungus beetle family (Erotylidae). Among its family, this species is placed in subfamily Tritominae, or – in taxonomic arrangements that prefer a more comprehensive subfamily Erotylinae – in tribe Tritomini of the Erotylinae.

This species was placed in genus Ischyrus by George Crotch when he first described it. Its type locality was not specified more precisely than "Mexico". The lectotype, designated in 2023, was collected by Auguste Sallé, and previously to being acquired by Crotch it was in the collection of Louis Chevrolat. It is now in the UMZC collection.

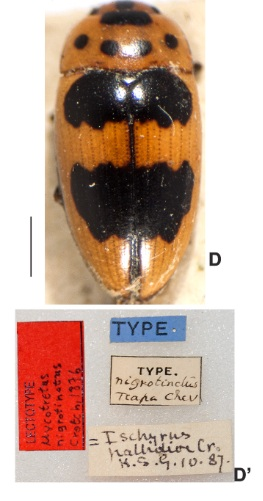
Type specimen of M.nigrotinctus, nowadays included in M.pallidior

A MNRJ specimen collected by P.Reyes on June 26, 1972, is from near Plan de Las Hayas in Juchique de Ferrer municipality, Veracruz. It was collected in a cafetal (coffee plantation) at an altitude of 650-680 m AMSL, indicating a collection locality between Plan de Las Hayas and Laguna de Farfán, as the former settlement is more than 1,000 m AMSL. Another MNRJ specimen tentatively assigned to M.pallidior suggests that this species is not endemic to Mexico, as traditionally believed. It was found on July 22, 1977, 13 km southeast of El Mochito mine (i.e. in the mountains between San José de Comayagua and the southern end of Lake Yojoa) in Honduras, with a printed collector label "CW&L. O’Brien & Marshall". Initially, it was suspected to be the similar species M.sexpunctatus, which is known from further east, but it was subsequently identified as M.pallidior. Like the "Plan de Las Hayas" specimen, it is unclear whether it is still extant after the 2018 fire which destroyed most of the MNRJ collections.

A specimen somewhat darker than the lectotype was mistaken by Crotch as a distinct species and described as M.nigrotinctus; it is considered not distinct from M.pallidior today. Also initially in the Chevrolat collection and now at the UMZC, the M.nigrotinctus lectotype, designated in 2023, was collected at Teapa in southeastern Mexico, east of the Isthmus of Tehuantepec and between Plan de Las Hayas and Lake Yojoa, but closer to the former locality. The reasons why Crotch described the same species twice in the same study are not clear, but it seems he was genuinely convinced that M.pallidior was an Ischyrus species, while he correctly assigned M.nigrotinctus to Mycotretus when he described it.
