= Orocuina =

- Municipality
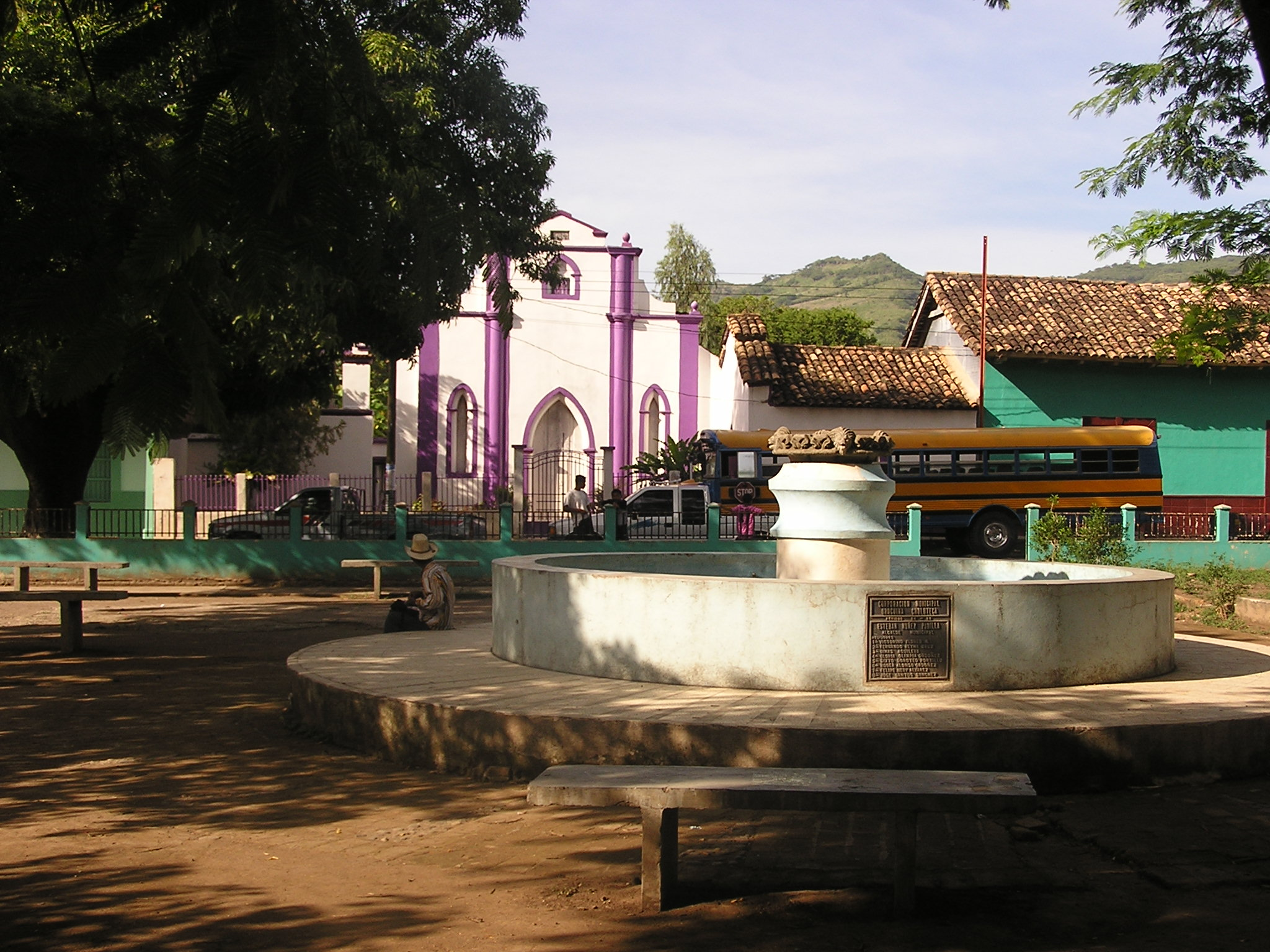
- Main plaza in Orocuina, Honduras

- Location in Honduras
- Coordinates: 13°29′N 87°06′W
- Country: Honduras
- Department: Choluteca

Orocuina is a municipality in the Honduran department of Choluteca.
