= Villa de San Antonio =

- Municipality
- Location within Honduras
- Coordinates: 14°19′N 87°37′W
- Country: Honduras
- Department: Comayagua

Area
  - Total: 341 km^{2} (132 sq mi)

Population (2015)
  - Total: 32,419
  - Density: 95.1/km^{2} (246/sq mi)

Villa de San Antonio is a municipality in the Honduran department of Comayagua.

The municipality consists of a casco urbano (main town), with approximately 7,000 residents, and a large number of 'aldeas' or villages, which bring the municipality's entire population to 17,000. The town is located 20 minutes by car from the department capitals of Comayagua and La Paz, and 90 minutes from Tegucigalpa. Principal economic activities include farming, factory work, and construction. The 'casco urbano' contains two kindergartens, two elementary schools, and one middle-high school, where students may study for diplomas in 'bachillerato' (liberal arts) or 'comercio.' There are two orphanages within the 'casco urbano;' the independent Hogar Tierra Santa and the Hogar San Antonio, affiliated with the Catholic charity Apufran. There is a health center staffed by a doctor and two nurses. The municipality of Villa de San Antonio was founded in 1537, the same year as the nearby city of Comayagua.
