= El Corpus =

- Municipality
- Location in Honduras
- Coordinates: 13°17′N 87°2′W
- Country: Honduras
- Department: Choluteca
- Owned by the Spanish: 1585
- Became a Municipality: July 27, 1827

Government
  - Mayor: Luis Andres Rueda Bellino

Area
  - Total: 242.3 km^{2} (93.6 sq mi)

Population (2013)
  - Total: 24,646
  - Density: 101/km^{2} (260/sq mi)
- Geocode: 0605

El Corpus is a municipality in the Honduran department of Choluteca.

== History ==
The Spanish founded El Corpus after a mine called Clavo Rico in 1585. El Corpus became a municipality on July 27, 1827.

== Demographics ==
According to the 2013 census, 75% of the population works in agriculture. Thirty-four percent uses some type of private water system, and 46% uses oil lamps for light. Ninety-five percent use firewood for cooking. Sixty-two percent has a basic education level and 5% of houses has at least one car.

Historical Population
Year	Population	%+	%+ yearly
1887	2,511		
1901	4,662	86.7	6.1
1905	4,718	1.2	0.3
1910	4,630	-1.9	-0.4
1916	5,447	17.6	3
1926	6,234	14.4	1.5
1930	7,478	20.0	5
1935	8,078	8.0	1.6
1940	9,899	22.5	4.5
1945	10,773	8.8	1.8
1950	11,302	4.9	1
1961	14,328	26.8	2.4
1974	15,238	6.4	0.5
1988	20,115	32.0	2.3
2001	21,856	8.7	0.7
2013	24,646	12.8	1.1
2018 (est.)	25,845	4.9	1

== Location ==
The municipality is located east of the department of Choluteca.

== Villages ==
The following 17 villages belong to the municipality:

- El Corpus (Municipal head)
- Agua Fría
- Calaire
- Cayanini
- El Baldoquín
- El Banquito
- El Despoblado
- El Naranjal
- El Pedregal
- El Zapotal
- La Albarrada
- La Fortuna
- La Galera
- San Isidro
- San Juan Abajo
- San Juan Arriba
- San Judas
