= Las Lajas, Honduras =

Las Lajas
- Municipality
- Location within Honduras
- Coordinates: 14°54′N 87°35′W
- Country: Honduras
- Department: Comayagua

Area
  - Total: 95.1 km^{2} (36.7 sq mi)

Population (2023 projection)
  - Total: 16,840
  - Density: 177/km^{2} (459/sq mi)

Las Lajas is a town, with a population of 12,000 (2023 calculation), and a municipality in the Honduran department of Comayagua.

== History ==
The village, from the 1970s to the 1980s, reached a remarkable demographic and economic development. Founded in 1902, it was created as municipality in 1986.

== Geography ==
=== Hydrography ===
The town is crossed by the Quebrada Seca de Daniel, also parallel to this crossed the Quebrada Galana, that when entering the town some call Quebrada Mangos.

=== Urbanization ===
Las Lajas began to fill the middle of this century due to livestock grazing activities in the summer then by the need for land for agricultural activities. The nature and legal status of the lands in this region correspond to national and ejido properties during this period and had no control over them by government authorities. The first inhabitants were taking over large tracts of land and building the first homes, Rafael Flores said that the families were named Flores, Ulloa, Ponce, Buezo and Romero, founding the first quarter known as El Porvenir, thus arise first fence and the first properties of the slabs, without thinking that in the future would become a thriving community. Today the Lajas has a messy and uneven urban development in the layout of its streets. The village comprises four neighborhoods with very particular characteristics and interests that sometimes has led to some contradictions to such a degree that come even to establish great rivalries, these neighborhoods are scattered and transmitted by a single street.

The Neighborhood Center is located along a single street with more than one kilometer in length approximately at the municipal offices are located, school, the main Catholic church, civil and military authorities, parks, shopping centers, grocery stores, hotels, gas station etc. El Barrio El Porvenir, this neighborhood is just north of downtown, is served by a wide street, with churches, primary schools, petrol station, bus station etc. To the south of the downtown district, is located Suyapa neighborhood, joined the San Francisco, the San Miguel and the track, which also have their own water service, school, health center, and the Institute of secondary schools and businesses Abarroteria. In the northwestern part of the district the center is developing a neighborhood called El Carmen, who spends his time as its population increases. Finally to the west lies the New Valley, which like the other is located along a street, with the same basic services that have the other neighborhoods.
