= El Rosario, Comayagua =

El Rosario
- Municipality
- Location within Honduras
- Coordinates: 14°34′N 87°44′W
- Country: Honduras
- Department: Comayagua

Area
  - Total: 300 km^{2} (120 sq mi)

Population (2015)
  - Total: 30,042
  - Density: 100/km^{2} (260/sq mi)

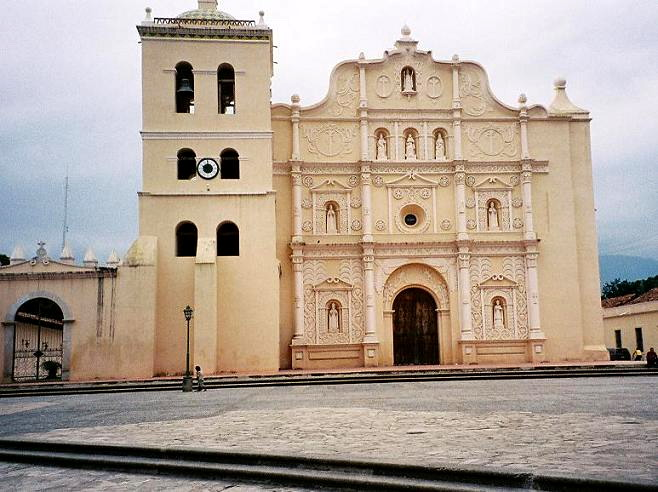
Catedralde Comayagua, a cathedral in El Rosario

El Rosario (Spanish pronunciation: [el roˈsaɾjo]) is a municipality in the Honduran department of Comayagua.

The municipality consists of a main town (Casco Urbano) with approximately 7,000 residents, and a large number of aldeas or villages, which bring the municipality's entire population to 17,000. The town is located one hour by car from the department of Comayagua and two and a half hours from Tegucigalpa. Principal economic activities include farming, construction, and factory work. The main town contains one kindergarten, an elementary school, and one middle high school, where students may study for diplomas in liberal arts or to become conters. There is a health center staffed by a doctor and two nurses. El Rosario has a mine and was founded in 1530 by the Spaniards.
