= San José, Choluteca =

San José
- Municipality
- Location in Honduras
- Coordinates: 13°41′N 87°24′W
- Country: Honduras
- Department: Choluteca

San José is a municipality in the Honduran department of Choluteca.
