= San Isidro, Choluteca =

San Isidro
- Municipality
- Location in Honduras
- Coordinates: 13°38′N 87°18′W
- Country: Honduras
- Department: Choluteca

Population (2015)
  - Total: 3,721
- Area code: 0613

San Isidro (Spanish pronunciation: [san iˈsiðɾo]) is a municipality in the Honduran department of Choluteca.
