= San Antonio de Flores =

- Municipality
- Location in Honduras
- Coordinates: 13°40′N 87°22′W
- Country: Honduras
- Department: Choluteca

San Antonio de Flores is a municipality in the Honduran department of Choluteca.

== History ==
In 1881, the municipality was created.

== Demographics ==
San Antonio de Flores, Choluteca has a current population of 6,073 inhabitants.
