= Concepción de María =

- Municipality
- Location in Honduras
- Coordinates: 13°13′N 87°0′W
- Country: Honduras
- Department: Choluteca
- Established: 1852

Area
  - Total: 156 km^{2} (60 sq mi)

Population
  - Total: 27,905
  - Density: 171/km^{2} (440/sq mi)

Concepción de María (Spanish pronunciation: [konseβˈsjon de maˈɾi.a]) is a municipality in the Honduran department of Choluteca

== History ==
Concepcion de Maria was established in 1852. At the time of the census of 1889, it was listed as a municipality within the Central District.

== Demographics ==
As of the Census of 2013, there were 26,905 people, 1% of which lived in a different place in the country 5 years ago. The main source of water is the private sector, which 27% of inhabitants use. 61% of the people have a basic educational level. The main source of light in houses is with an oil or gas lamp with a 48% using it. Ninety-six percent of the houses use firewood to cook. Three percent of the people has a car of their own. According to Necesidades Básica Insatisfechas 2013 (Unsatisfied Basic Needs) 64% of the population lives in poverty and according with El Instituto de Estadisticas INE 2005 65% live in extreme poverty.

Historical Population
Year	Population	%+	%+ yearly
1887	1,526		
1901	3,168	107.6	7.7
1910	3,074	-3.0	-0.3
1916	4,167	35.6	5.9
1926	3,347	-19.7	-2.0
1930	5,131	53.3	13.3
1935	5,999	16.9	3.4
1940	7,713	28.6	5.7
1945	8,516	10.4	2.1
1950	8,967	5.3	1.1
1961	13,603	51.7	4.7
1974	16,478	21.1	1.6
1988	21,717	31.8	2.3
2001	24,406	12.4	1.0
2013	26,875	10.1	0.8
2018 (est.)	27,905	3.8	0.8

== Geography ==
The municipality covers an area of 156 km^{2}. The municipality contains 33 villages (aldeas) and 163 hamlets.
