= Pre-Columbian Honduras =

Territories of modern-Honduras before European colonization

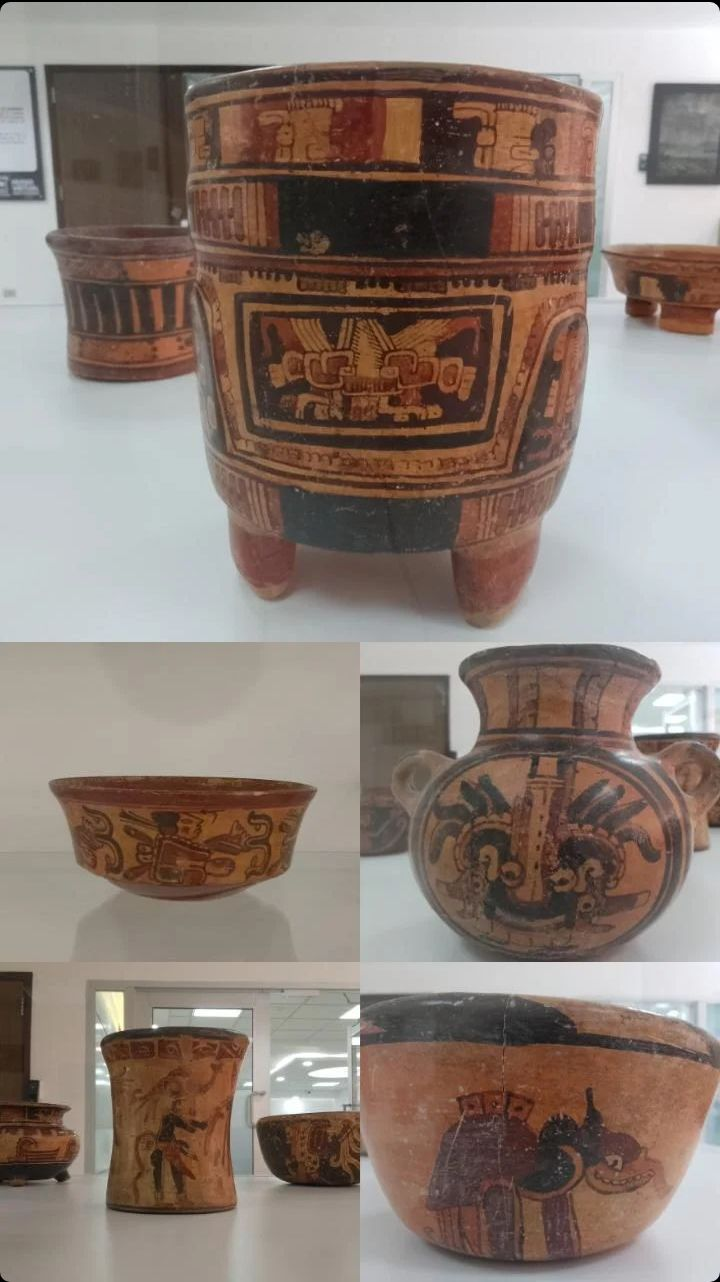
Vessels dated from the Classic mesoamerican period, brought from the archaeological sites of Ulua-Yojoa and Copan.

The territory of current Honduras was inhabited by two culturally distinct peoples: the cultures of Mesoamerican and nahua influence and the cultures of the intermediate area that had certain influences from Circum-Caribbean and Chibcha groups. Although the Mesoamerican influence was the one that remained as the dominant influence in the territory.

The pre-Columbian past of Honduras is still under study and much of it is still an enigma. But the archaeological remains of organized nomadic and semi-nomadic groups date back at least 11,000 to 12,000 years. Although it is possible that there was human presence in the territory much earlier. Archaeologists have been found dating back to more than a thousand years before Christ with societies already established in the Honduran territory.

== Culture and achievements ==
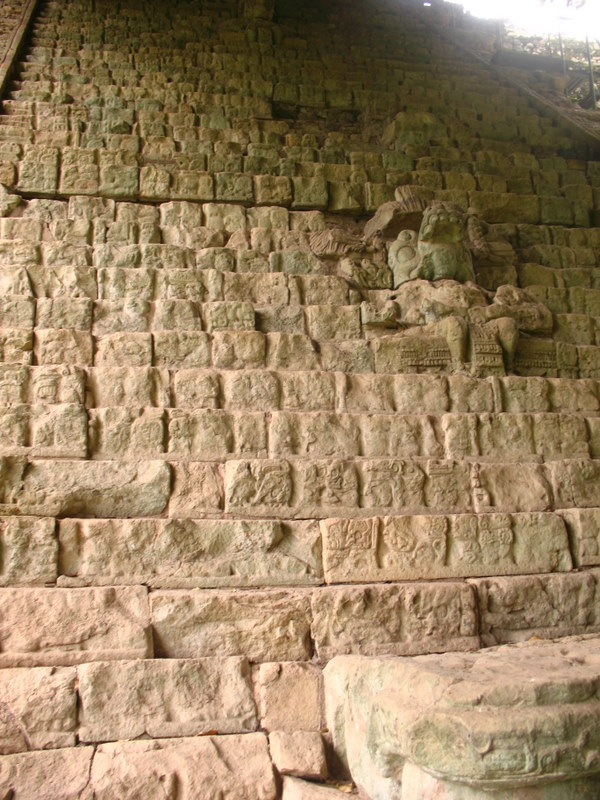
The hieroglyphic stairway of Copan is considered the longest Mayan text yet found.

The influence of Mesoamerican cultures from the valley and southern Mexico can be observed in the archaeological sites of Yarumela, Tenampua, and Los Naranjos during the late pre-classic period and mid classic period. We can see these influence mainly in the pyramidal structures. The largest in Honduras is the structure 101 of Yarumela, also known as "El Cerrito", which is more than 20 meters high and can be seen from almost anywhere in the valley where the site was located. Copan was also influenced from other regions and cities from the Mayan and Mesoamerican world, like Tikal and Teotihuacan.

This last one having a big influence in the city thanks to the trade routes that extended from the Valley of Mexico to central Honduras to the Lencan region. In the northern part of the country pyramid like structures can still be seen in many mounds built by other cultures such as the Xicaque and Pcultures. After cultural encounter with Mayans, they started to adopt soon a pyramid like style of construction as seen in the archaeological sites of the valley of Sula near the city of San Pedro Sula Cortes. Other archaeological site that has these characteristics is the archaeological site of El Curruste, with many mounds that reach the six to eight meters most of them used for religious ceremonies.

=== Agriculture ===
They were driven by the development of a varied agriculture (beans, cocoa, chili, etc.) and had large irrigation systems. In this way, they guaranteed adequate food for their populations within the Mesoamerican area of influence. In the case of the region east of the great transversal depression of Honduras and next to the Caribbean Sea, we have yam or mountain cassava crops along with hunting and fishing that characterize the Circuncaribe cultural influence. They were also growers of fruits native to the continent such as Papaya, Pineapple, Tomato and Avocado. These fruits play an important role in the economy.

=== Arts ===
They also developed techniques in textiles and ceramics, many of which were decorated with all kinds of illustrations that represent a human or an animal. Complex and varied trades of these arts were also developed.

Architecture also founds an important role in these cultures, the most developed in the national territory was the Mayan. In the western national territory you can find ruins of Mayan cities such as Copan and El Puente as examples of this and a number of mounds scattered throughout the territory where they were present.

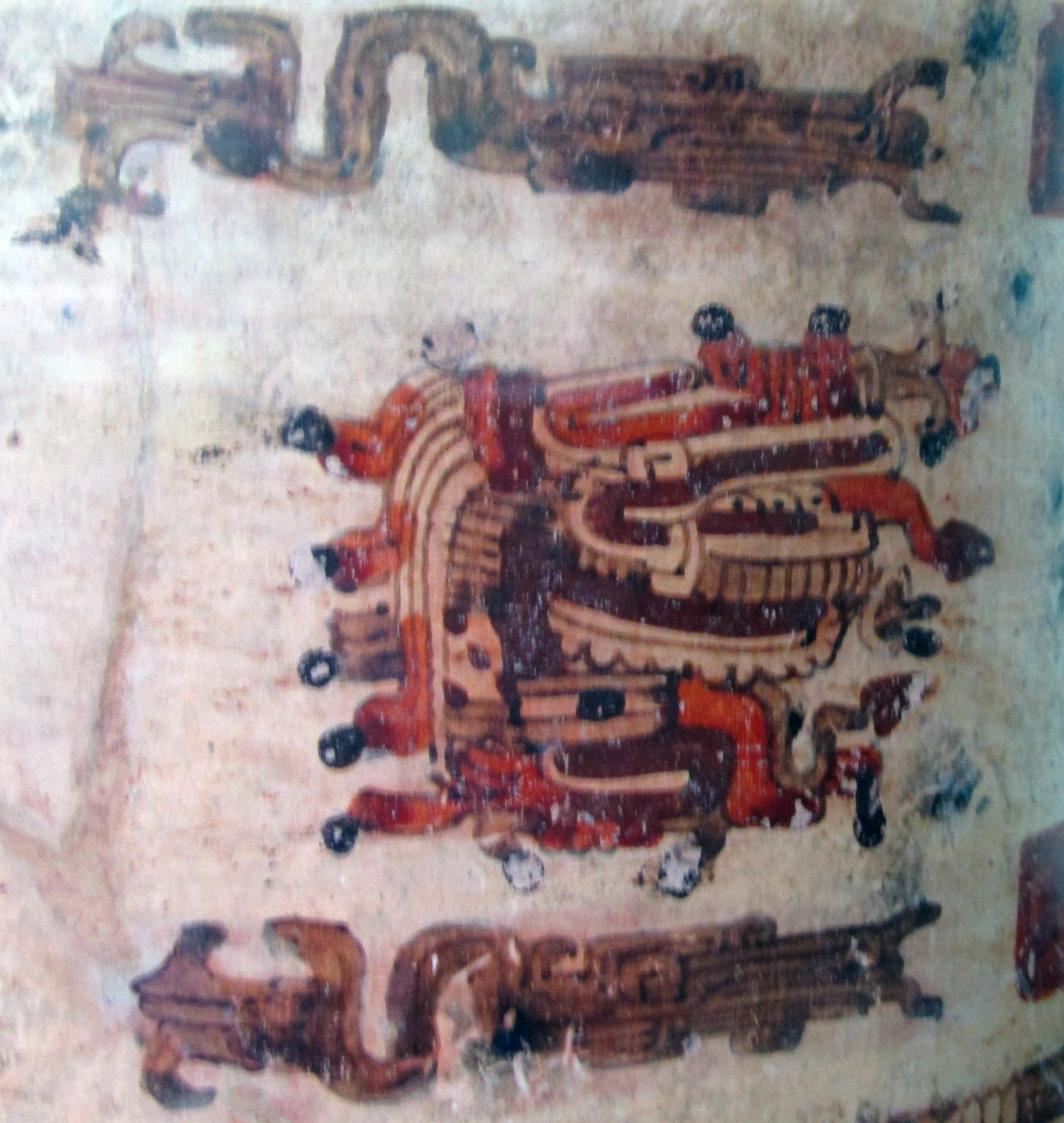
A design of animal features on a preclassic vessel from Lake Yojoa.

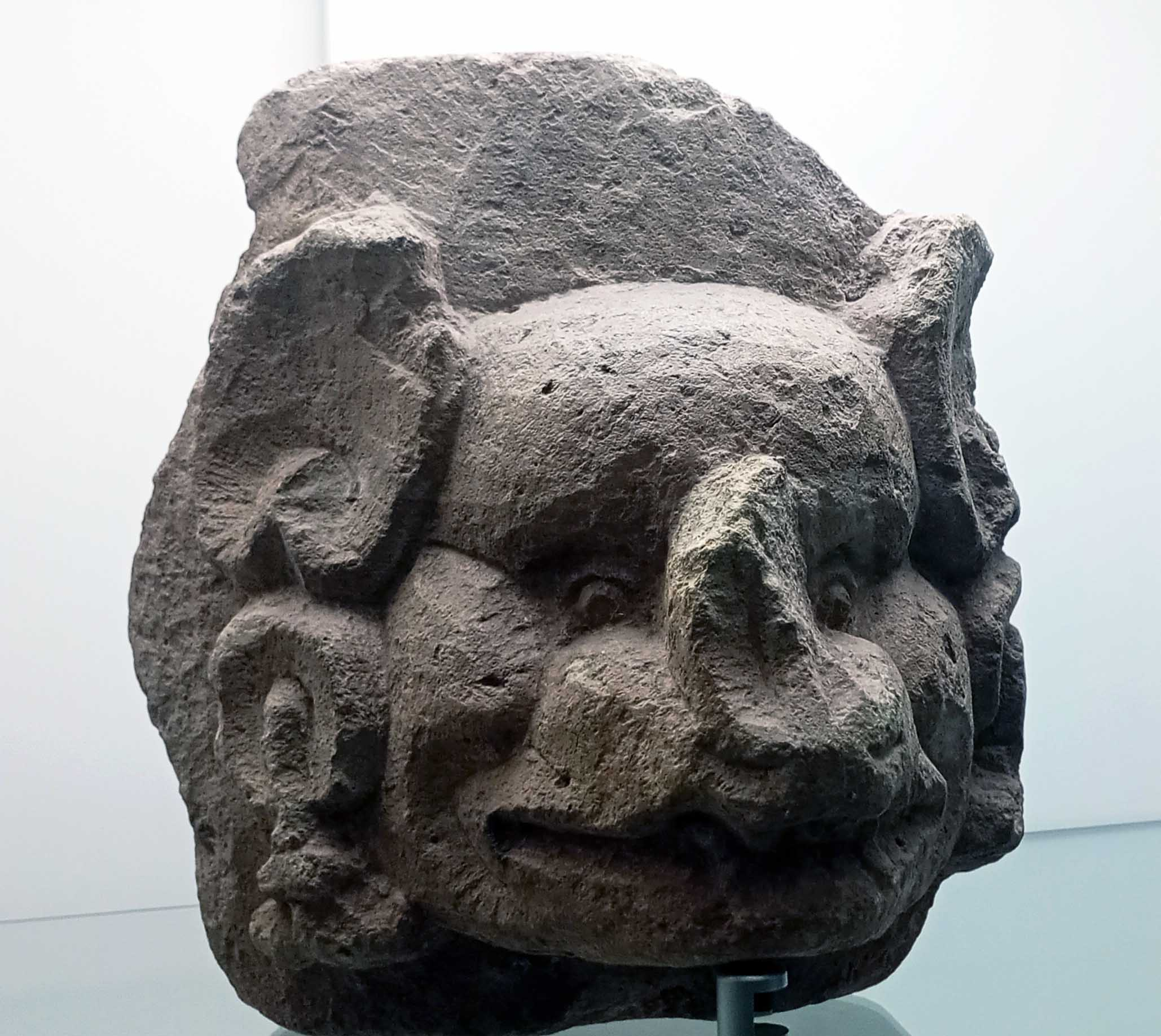
Sculpture of the god Camazotz

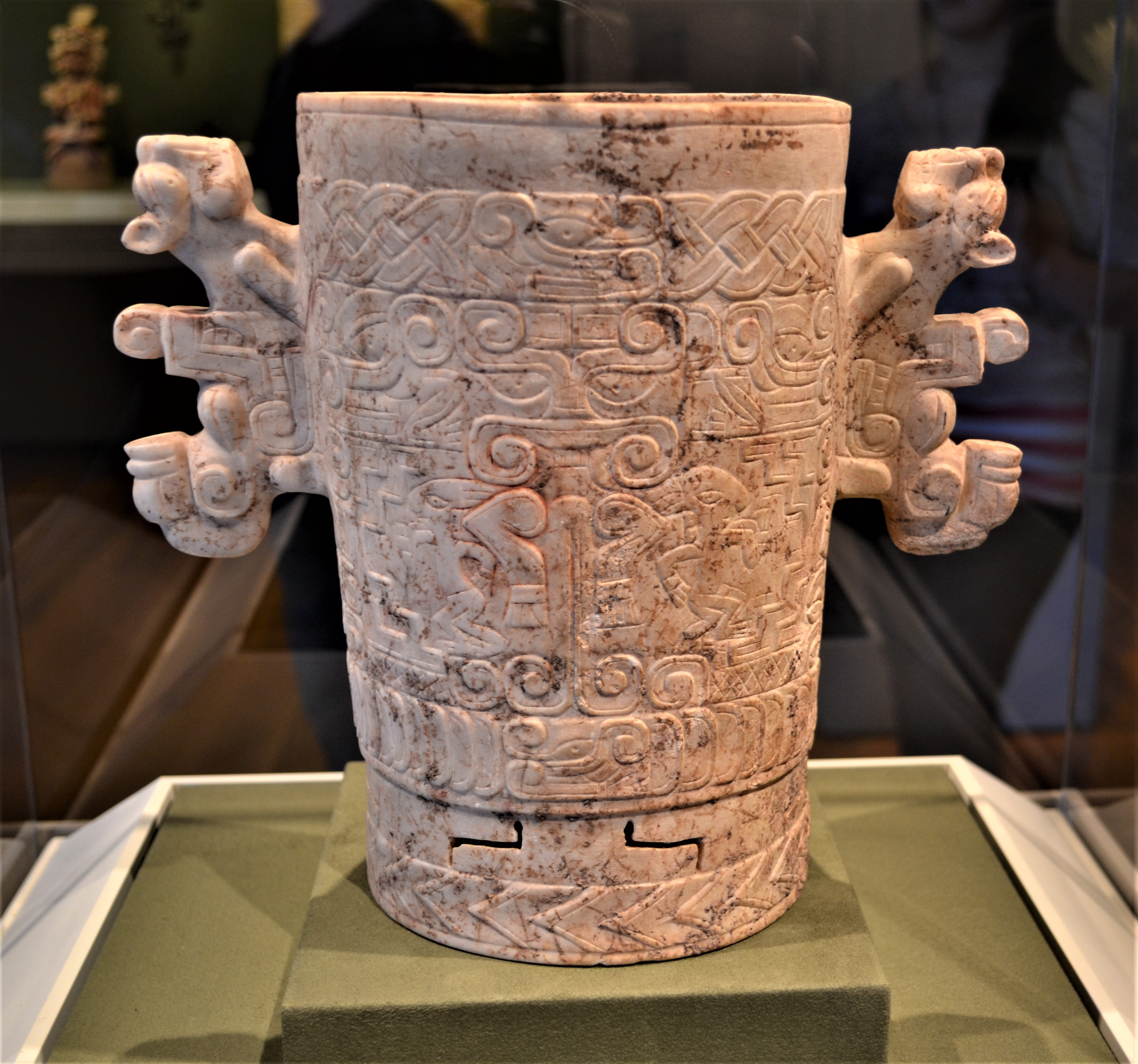
Marble vessel from the Ulua region

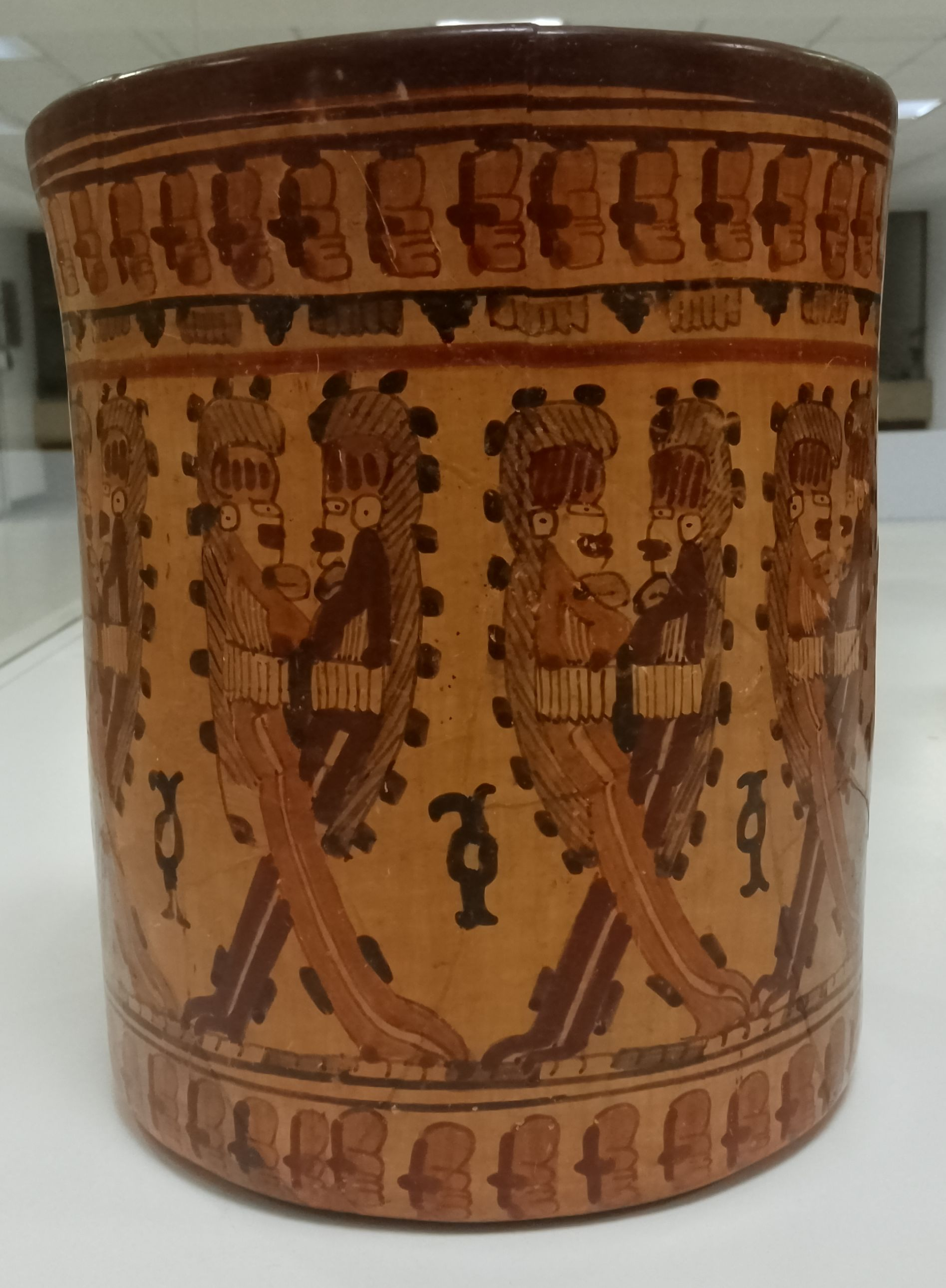
Polychrome Lenca vessel from the Classic period

=== Sciences ===
They reached a high scientific development in mathematics and astronomy; in addition to architecture and sculpture, that employed in the construction of big cities. In addition to engineering and sculpture, which they used in the construction of large cities, even having systems of aqueducts and drains that are still functional

The calendar and systems to calculate the movement of stars and planets like Venus is another of their great advances in science. The writing was also quite developed, the Mayan writing had more than two thousand different characters each with one representing a different word, element or phrase. Archaeoastronomic studies in places such as the Comayagua Valley or Copan demonstrate a very extensive use of astronomy to identify these peoples.

=== Economy ===
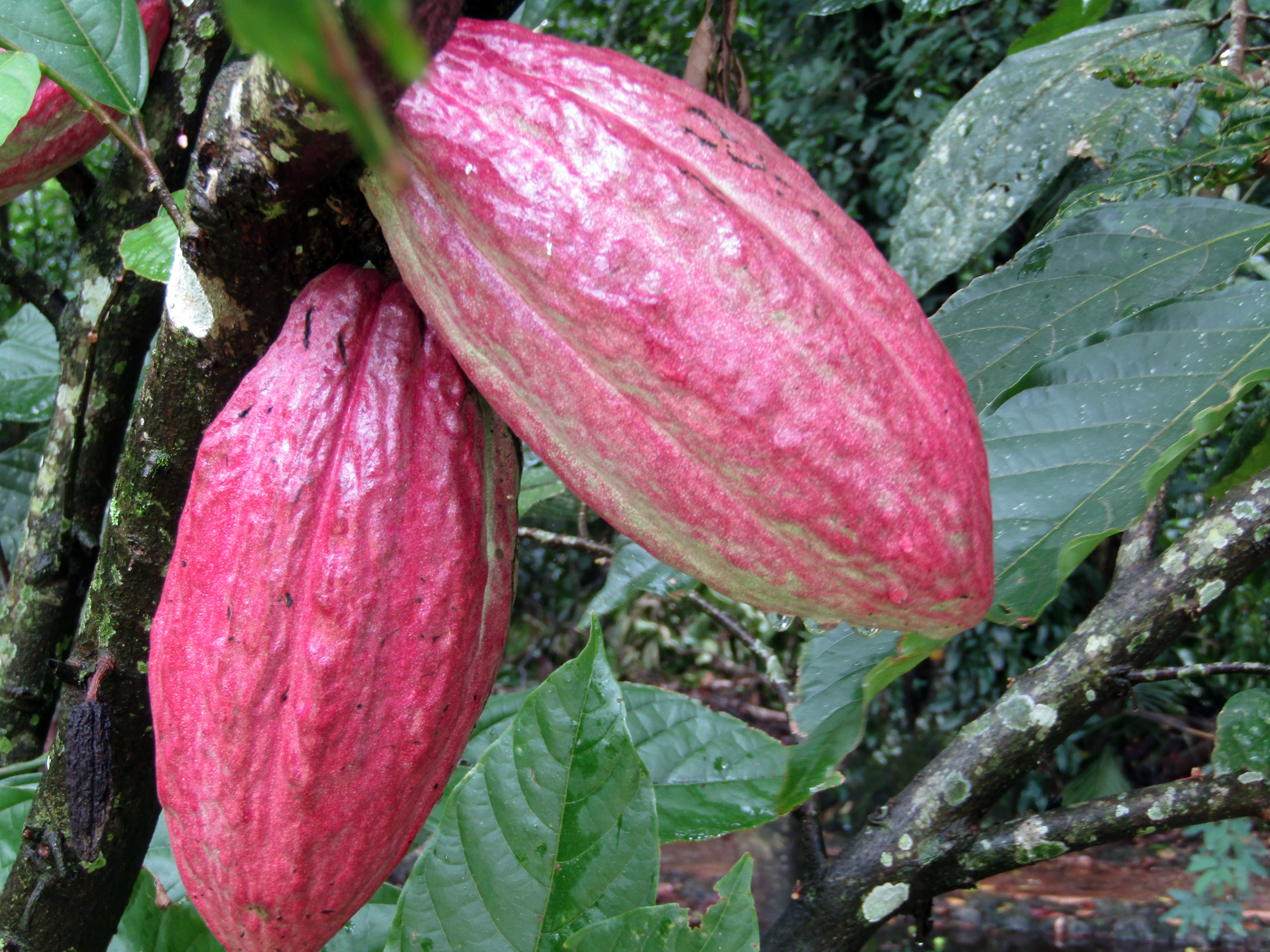
Cocoa beans grown near Lake Yojoa.

The economy of these societies was mostly based in the agriculture of fruits and vegetables, although the creation and export of pottery pieces was also crucial for the development of these people. Other lesser-known activities of the pre-Hispanic Honduran peoples were the marketing of stones such as obsidian. There is archaeological evidence of changes and trade routes with different towns, such as those in Yarumela, which was a key area for the trade and commercial exchange of merchandise from various cultural areas. It was imported jewels from Guatemala and beans that came from Yucatán Mexico, such as cocoa beans.

The cultural contact through the trade of these people went from the north of the valley of Mexico to what today comprises Nicaragua and the Caribbean. Important pieces of Jade and metals from archaeological sites in Mayan cities such as Copan Ruinas and El Puente show that they maintained absolute control of trade networks during the classical period. For the Post classic period, the Mayan culture was in decline and had lost its political-military power in Honduras, therefore the Lenca kingdoms maintained contact with some cultures until the arrival of the conquerors.

=== Religion ===
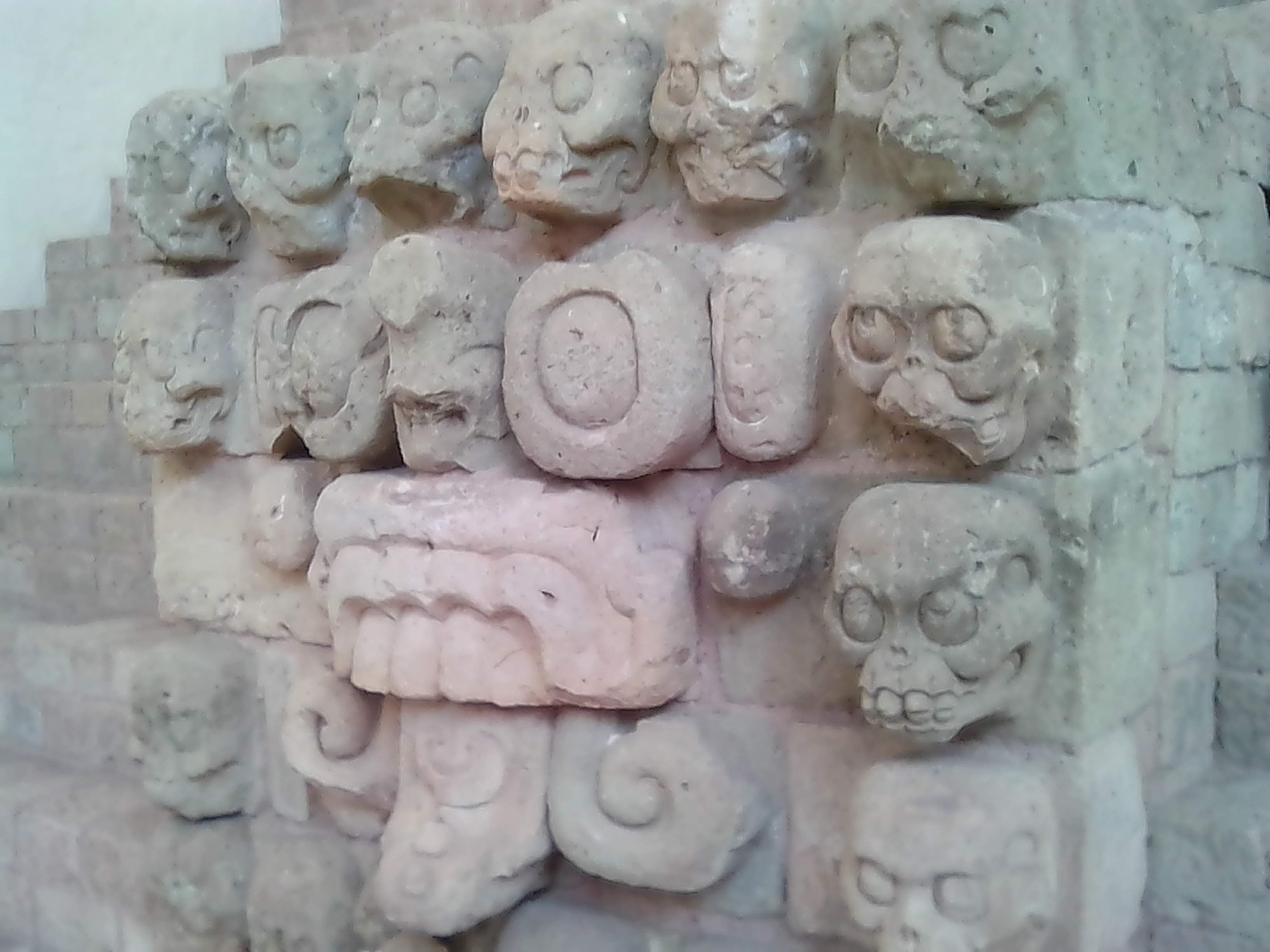
The rain god, Chaac at the museum of Copan.

Most of the religions of the natives belonging to what today comprises the Honduran territory were polytheistic in nature. Many of the deities that various peoples worshiped were hierarchical. In the Mayan area of the country, religion was not far from that of the rest of the indigenous people of this culture, since the same rites were practiced and the same deities were worshiped as in all the area that this culture understood.

The Lenca autochthonous religion was highly influenced by Nahualism, also having hierarchically organized deities. Some of its most important deities were Itanipuca (great earth mother), Ilanguipuca (great sky father), Icelaca (lord of seasons) among others. As for the peoples of circum-Caribbean origin that inhabit the country, each one had their own religion with their own belief system and deities. Some archaeological remains show that these peoples also had representations of their gods either in rock carvings or paintings.

== Mesoamerican cultures ==
This area in the Honduran context is characterized by the following cultural features, intensive agriculture with emphasis on the cultivation of corn, cultivation of cocoa, polished obsidian, pyrite mirrors, copper tubes for piercing stones, swords of wood with flint or obsidian leaves on the edges, headdresses like a turban, step pyramids, stucco floors, ball games, hieroglyphic writing, codices, ritual calendar of 260 days and solar calendar of 365 days forming a cycle of 52 years, specialized markets, military orders, wars to obtain victims for sacrifice and city states that made up an advanced civilization, in addition to having a social stratification where the ruler was the link between the land and the gods.

In the northwestern section of Honduras, villages with Tolteca influences predominated, between them the following:

- The Náhuatl: also known as the papayecas, lived in the valley of Naco and Trujillo;
- The Ch'orti' people were located in Cortés, Copán and Ocotepeque
- The Lencas, that extended by the departments of Santa Bárbara, Lempira, Intibucá, La Paz, Comayagua, Francisco Morazán, Valle and part of what today comprises the territory of El Salvador.

== Intermediate area cultures ==
The region located in the southeast of Honduras has distinctive characteristics that differentiate it from other cultural areas. Among these characteristics are the existence of matrilineal clans, unique funerary practices such as the ingestion of bones of deceased relatives, the use of ornaments on the edge of the ear, as well as the cultivation of coca and palms.

Unlike Mesoamerica, this intermediate area was organized in chieftain societies in which leaders were not considered bearers of divine power, but rather their authority was based on earthly relationships. This sociopolitical context allowed the development of relatively complex social structures, as well as a notable advance in technology. The technical and artistic production of decorated ceramics, together with the development of goldsmithing and lapidary arts, stands out as evidence of a high degree of sophistication in these societies.

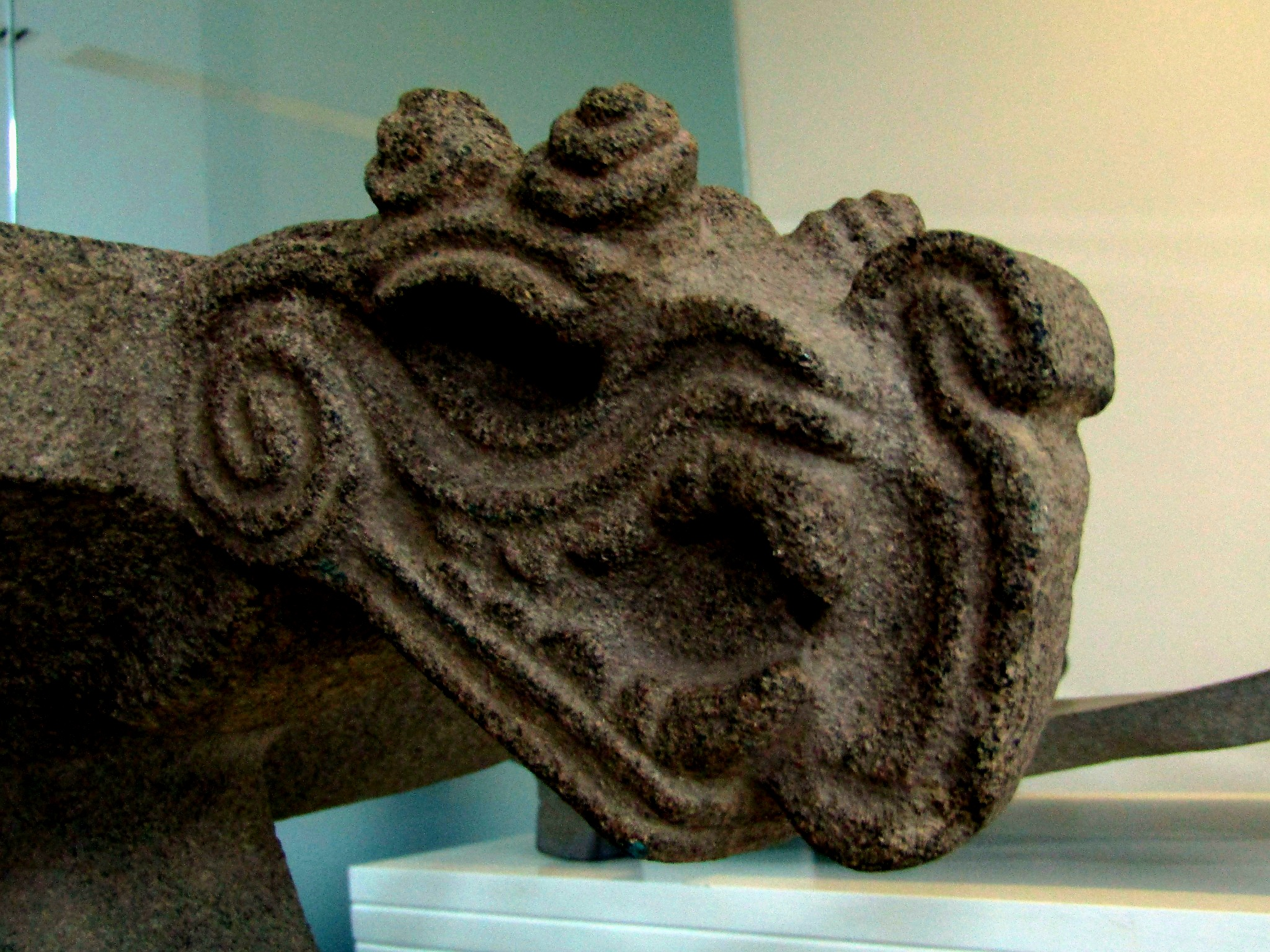
A metate located in the intermediate cultural area of Honduras.

This analysis invites us to reconsider traditional notions about social organization and cultural expression in the intermediate area, revealing a rich diversity that deserves deeper study in the context of pre-Columbian civilizations.

Between these villages found the following:

- Xicaques,
- Pech people,
- Tawahka / Mayangna (Sumo)
- and Miskito people.

Into this group, falls the majority of the population of the country.

== Lencas ==
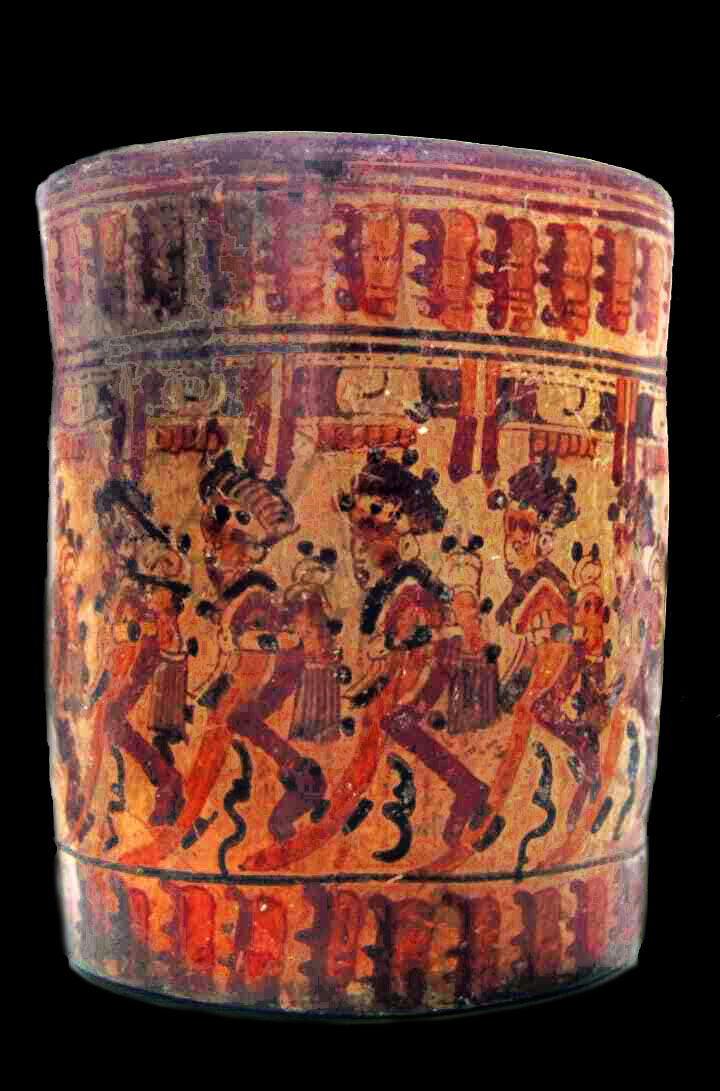
Vase from the Lenca culture of the classic period found in the Ulúa region.

The largest population is the Lencas who, when the Spanish arrived, were the most widespread and organised of the groups of the country.

They lived in populations of considerable size, with an average of 350 houses and much more of 500 people. Although scientific controversies exist on the descendants and origin of the Lencas, of agreement to Rodolfo Baron Castro, are the direct rests heirs of the Mayas, that did not follow the exodus that gave end to the Ancient Empire. At the arrival of the Spaniards, they were established in the territory that today comprises the Republics of El Salvador and Honduras." However, other theories maintain that this group is much older, possibly being a descendant of Olemecs, thanks to the archaeological evidence of Los Naranjois, which were confirmed to be built by ancestors of this culture.

The Maya area consists of what in our days are the countries of Honduras, Guatemala, El Salvador and Mexico.

The Maya flowered in these countries in the first fifteen centuries of the Christian era. Causes unknown to this day, caused the abandonment and destruction of Copán and other Mayan cities, that in the period of the Spanish conquest were no longer more than ruins. Hunger, plagues, internal wars have been proposed as causes of the abandonment.

== End of Pre-Hispanic Honduras ==
This period of national history came to an end in 1524. After the fall of the Aztec empire in 1521 with the victory of Hernán Cortés and his allies, Gil González Dávila became the first Spaniard to arrive in Honduras for conquest purposes. Which had to face a huge, violent and well organized indigenous resistance.

Then Cortes, moved by the reports he had received on the great wealth found in those territories, gave authorization to send two expeditions, one for more and the other for land. The first was entrusted to Pedro de Alvarado and the second to Cristóbal de Olid, the latter, betrayed him. For this reason, Cortés left Mexico to capture and execute him for his actions. During the two years of the conqueror's stay, he introduced the cattle and fruits from Spain. He founded the town of Natividad near Puerto Horses and appointed Hernando de Saavedra, Governor of Honduras and left instructions to treat the indigenous people well, allowing some of them to keep their lands and properties.

== See also ==
- History of Honduras
- Ethnicity in Honduras
- Chortís
- Sumu
- Pech
- Languages of Honduras
- Spanish conquest of Honduras
