= Meámbar =

- Municipality
- Location within Honduras
- Coordinates: 14°47′N 87°46′W
- Country: Honduras
- Department: Comayagua

Area
  - Total: 409.7 km^{2} (158.2 sq mi)

Population (2013)
  - Total: 12,522
  - Density: 30.56/km^{2} (79.16/sq mi)

Meámbar is a municipality in the department of Comayagua in Honduras. It covers an area of 409.7 km^{2} (158.2 sq mi) and had a population of 12,522 inhabitants according to the 2013 census.

== History ==
Petroglyphs and other archeological evidence from the pre-Columbian period have been found between the villages of Loma Alta and Palmital in the municipality. The history of the first known settlement goes back to 1630 to the indigenous village of Meámbar, which was located east to the current settlement on the right bank of the Piojo River. "Meámbar" roughly translates to "water of the corn and sugarcane" in the Mesoamerican language. In 1801, Alonso Oseguera de Contreras established the municipality on the west bank of the Piojo River. During the Spanish colonial period, it served as a strategic transit center due to its central location, and became a major commercial hub.

== Geography ==
Meámbar is located in the department of Comayagua in Honduras. The municipality covers an area of 409.7 km^{2} (158.2 sq mi). It is located in the northwestern part of the department, and borders the Cortés department to the north and west. The Laguna Seca Mountain mountains are located in the west central part of the municipality. It is traversed by the Maragua and Piojo rivers, and the water storage area of the Francisco Morazán Dam, which is located in the nearby municipality of Santa Cruz de Yojoa, occupies majority of the north western part of the municipality. Approximately 80% of the land area is covered by broad leaf forests, and the Meámbar Azul National Park is located next to the along Lake Yojoa to the west.

Meámbar has a tropical monsoon climate (Köppen climate classification: Am). The municipality has an average annual temperature of 23.03 °C (73.45 °F) and typically receives about 266.57 mm (10.495 in) of annual precipitation.

== Administration ==
The municipality comprises 25 aldeas (villages) and their associated caseríos (hamlets).

Aldeas of Meámbar
Aldea	Population (2013)	Men	Women
Meámbar	1,142	579	563
Agua Caliente	407	205	202
Chichipate	120	64	56
El Aguaje	377	194	183
El Buen Pastor	659	320	339
El Cienegal No. 1	295	157	138
El Palmital	848	466	382
El Zapote	179	94	85
Jicarito	418	204	214
La Concepción	559	277	282
La Joya	483	258	225
La Mesa	356	182	174
La Pimienta	457	247	210
Las Lajas	817	415	402
Los Globos	840	444	396
San José de los Planes	894	455	439
Matapalo	154	83	71
Monte de Dios	591	294	297
Ojo de Agua	155	86	69
Potrerillos	253	124	129
Pueblo Nuevo	442	225	217
San Antonio de Buenos Aires	555	264	291
San Isidro	291	143	148
Santa Ana	784	404	380
Santa Elena	446	213	233
Total	12,522	6,398	6,124

== Demographics ==
According to the 2013 census, Meámbar had a total population of 12,522 inhabitants, of whom 6,398 (51.1%) were men and 6,124 (48.9%) were women. The entire population was classified as rural.

By broad age group, 5,265 individuals (42.0%) were aged 0–14 years, 6,657 individuals (53.2%) were aged 15–64, and 599 individuals (4.8%) were aged 65 years and over. The median age was 18.0 years and the mean age was 23.5 years. Among the population aged 15 and over, the municipality recorded an illiteracy rate of 22.2%, significantly higher than the departmental average of 14.6%. The municipality had 2,544 occupied private dwellings, with an average of 4.8 persons per occupied dwelling.

The economy is dependent on agriculture and livestock rearing. Major agricultural produce include sugarcane, coffee, cucumber, and beet.
