= Apacilagua =

- Municipality
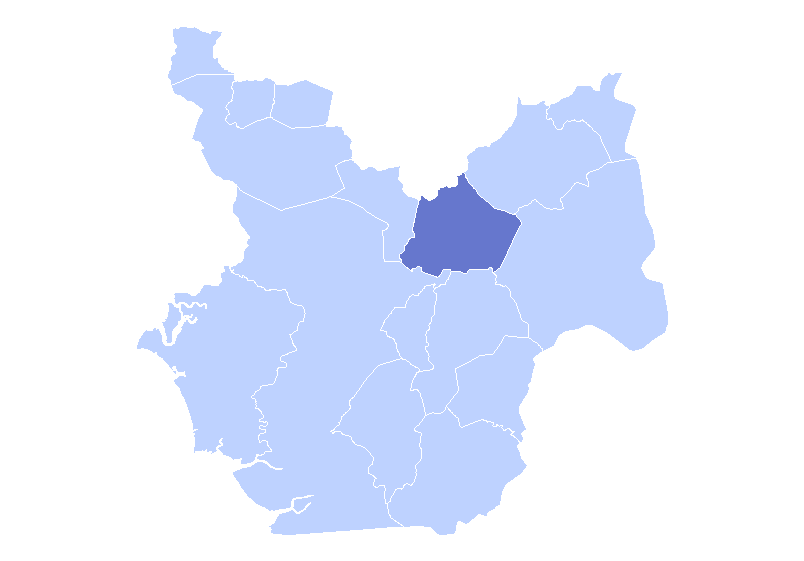
- The municipality of Apacilagua highlighted in the Choluteca Department

- Location in Honduras
- Coordinates: 13°28′45″N 87°4′30″W
- Country: Honduras
- Department: Choluteca

Area
  - Total: 213.1 km^{2} (82.3 sq mi)
- Elevation: 140 m (460 ft)

Population (2015)
  - Total: 9,075
  - Density: 42/km^{2} (110/sq mi)
- Climate: Aw

Apacilagua (Spanish pronunciation: [apasiˈlaɣwa]) is a small town and municipality in the Honduran department of Choluteca. It is situated 29.3 kilometres (18.2 mi) by road to the northeast of the town of Choluteca, in the northern mid part of the province, not far from the border with the El Paraíso Department. The small town of Apacilagua lies on the Choluteca River along the RN85 road, and contains the Iglesia Catolica Apacilagua, a Catholic church. The municipality covers an area of 213.1 square kilometres (82.3 sq mi), and contains 8 villages and 149 hamlets. As of 2015 it had a population of 9,075 people.

== History ==
The municipality was established in 1831. At the time of the census of 1887 it was listed as a municipality within Orocuina District.

In August 2012, the Centro de Documentación e Información para la Seguridad Alimentaria y Nutricional (Documentation and Information Center for Food and Nutrition Security) (CEDESAN) was established in Apacilagua, opened by the mayor, Rafael Mendoza. The centre is affiliated with the Programa Regional de Seguridad Alimentaria y Nutricional para Centroamérica (Regional Program for Food and Nutrition Security for Central America) (PRESANCA), which seeks to ensure food and nutritional safety within Central America, which has the financial support of the European Union, the Spanish Agency for International Development Cooperation (AECID), the United Nations Development Program (UNDP) and the Government of Finland.

== Geography ==
The small town of Apacilagua is situated 29.3 kilometres (18.2 mi) by road to the northeast of the town of Choluteca, in the northern mid part of the province, not far from the border with the El Paraíso Department. Apacilagua lies on the Choluteca River along the RN85 road. The municipality covers an area of 213.1 square kilometres (82.3 sq mi).

=== Villages and hamlets ===
The municipal area contains eight villages (aldeas) and 149 hamlets. The eight villages are:

- Apacilagua (seat of municipality)
- La Albarrada
- La Garza
- Los Limones
- Los Mezcales
- Monte Grande
- San Felipe
- Somuina

== Economic Activities ==
89% of the economic activity comes from Agriculture, Cattle, Forestry, and Fishing. 1.7% comes from teaching, 1.6% from Wholesale, Retail, and Vehicle Repair. 3% from Manufacturing and Construction and 4.9% from other sources.
