= Ojos de Agua, Honduras =

Ojos de Agua
- Municipality
- Location within Honduras
- Coordinates: 14°43′N 87°52′W
- Country: Honduras
- Department: Comayagua

Area
  - Total: 167 km^{2} (64 sq mi)

Population (2015)
  - Total: 10,603
  - Density: 63.5/km^{2} (164/sq mi)

Ojos de Agua is a municipality in Comayagua Department in Honduras.
