= Namasigüe =

- Municipality
- Location in Honduras
- Coordinates: 13°12′N 87°08′W
- Country: Honduras
- Department: Choluteca

Namasigüe (Spanish pronunciation: [namaˈsiɣwe]) is a municipality in the Honduran department of Choluteca.
