= Santa Ana de Yusguare =

Sta. Ana de Yusguare
- Municipality
- Location in Honduras
- Coordinates: 13°18′N 87°07′W
- Country: Honduras
- Department: Choluteca

Santa Ana de Yusguare (Spanish pronunciation: [ˈsanta ˈana ðe ʝusˈɣwaɾe]) is a municipality in the Honduran department of Choluteca.
