= ISO 3166-2:HN =

Entry for Honduras in ISO 3166-2

ISO 3166-2:HN is the entry for Honduras in ISO 3166-2, part of the ISO 3166 standard published by the International Organization for Standardization (ISO), which defines codes for the names of the principal subdivisions (e.g., provinces or states) of all countries coded in ISO 3166-1.

Currently for Honduras, ISO 3166-2 codes are defined for 18 departments.

Each code consists of two parts, separated by a hyphen. The first part is HN, the ISO 3166-1 alpha-2 code of Honduras. The second part is two letters.

== Current codes ==
Subdivision names are listed as in the ISO 3166-2 standard published by the ISO 3166 Maintenance Agency (ISO 3166/MA).

Subdivision names are sorted in traditional Spanish alphabetical order: a-n, ñ, o-z.

Click on the button in the header to sort each column.

Code	Subdivision name (es)
HN-AT	Atlántida
HN-CH	Choluteca
HN-CL	Colón
HN-CM	Comayagua
HN-CP	Copán
HN-CR	Cortés
HN-EP	El Paraíso
HN-FM	Francisco Morazán
HN-GD	Gracias a Dios
HN-IN	Intibucá
HN-IB	Islas de la Bahía
HN-LP	La Paz
HN-LE	Lempira
HN-OC	Ocotepeque
HN-OL	Olancho
HN-SB	Santa Bárbara
HN-VA	Valle
HN-YO	Yoro

== Changes ==
The following changes to the entry are listed on ISO's online catalogue, the Online Browsing Platform:

Effective date of change	Short description of change
2011-12-13	Comment taken into account and source list update.

The following changes to the entry have been announced in newsletters by the ISO 3166/MA since the first publication of ISO 3166-2 in 1998:

Newsletter	Date issued	Description of change in newsletter
Newsletter II-3	2011-12-13 (corrected 2011-12-15)	Comment taken into account and source list update.

== See also ==
- Subdivisions of Honduras
- FIPS region codes of Honduras
- Neighbouring countries: GT, NI, SV
