= Ajuterique =

- Municipality
- Location within Honduras
- Coordinates: 14°23′N 87°42′W
- Country: Honduras
- Department: Comayagua

Area
  - Total: 61.67 km^{2} (23.81 sq mi)

Population (2013)
  - Total: 11,356
  - Density: 184.1/km^{2} (476.9/sq mi)
- Climate: Am

Ajuterique is a municipality in the department of Comayagua in Honduras. It covers an area of 61.67 km^{2} (23.81 sq mi) and had a population of 11,356 inhabitants according to the 2013 census.

== History ==
The town of Santiago de Axuterique was established in 1550, about a league's distance from the cathedral at Comayagua. It was granted to Marcos de Reyna, with the land measurements were carried out by Josef Calderón de la Barca. It was placed under the protection of San Santiago, with the friar Francisco de Cañaveral in charge of it. On 30 January 1693, five and half caballerías of land was sold for 440 Tostones. It suffered damage during an earthquake in 1774. The town was elevated to a status of a municipality in 1865. During the Second Honduran Civil War in 1924, forces of Gregorio Ferrera fought against the government forces of president Vicente Tosta Carrasco at Ajuterique. The town suffered damages due to flooding of the Ganzo River, several times since the mid 20th century.

== Geography ==
Ajuterique is located in the department of Comayagua in Honduras. The municipality covers an area of 61.67 km^{2} (23.81 sq mi).

Ajuterique has a tropical monsoon climate (Köppen climate classification: Am). The municipality has an average annual temperature of 23.75 °C (74.75 °F) and typically receives about 274.89 mm (10.822 in) of annual precipitation.

== Administrative divisions ==
The municipality comprises four aldeas (villages) and their associated caseríos (hamlets).

Aldeas of Ajuterique
Aldea	Total Population	Men	Women
Ajuterique	6,801	3,265	3,536
El Misterio	712	350	362
Playitas	2,056	995	1,061
San Antonio del Playón	1,787	906	881
Total	11,356	5,517	5,839

== Demographics ==
According to the 2013 census, Ajuterique had a total population of 11,356 inhabitants, of whom 5,517 (48.6%) were men and 5,839 (51.4%) were women. About 50.1% of the population was classified as urban and 5,669 residents (49.9%) lived in the rural areas.

By broad age group, 3,780 individuals (33.3%) were aged 0–14 years, 6,932 individuals (61.0%) were aged 15–64, and 645 individuals (5.7%) were aged 65 years and over. The median age was 22.4 years and the mean age was 26.6 years. Among the population aged 15 and over, the municipality recorded an illiteracy rate of 13.8%, slightly lower than the departmental average of 14.6%. The municipality had 2,552 occupied private dwellings, with an average of 4.4 persons per occupied dwelling.
