= San José de Comayagua =

San José Comayagua
- Municipality
- Location within Honduras
- Coordinates: 14°44′N 88°02′W
- Country: Honduras
- Department: Comayagua

Area
  - Total: 83 km^{2} (32 sq mi)

Population (2015)
  - Total: 7,856
  - Density: 95/km^{2} (250/sq mi)

San José de Comayagua (Spanish pronunciation: [saŋ xoˈse ðe komaˈʝaɣwa]) is a municipality in the Honduran department of Comayagua.
