= San Marcos de Colón =

San Marcos de Colón (Mandaime)
- Municipality
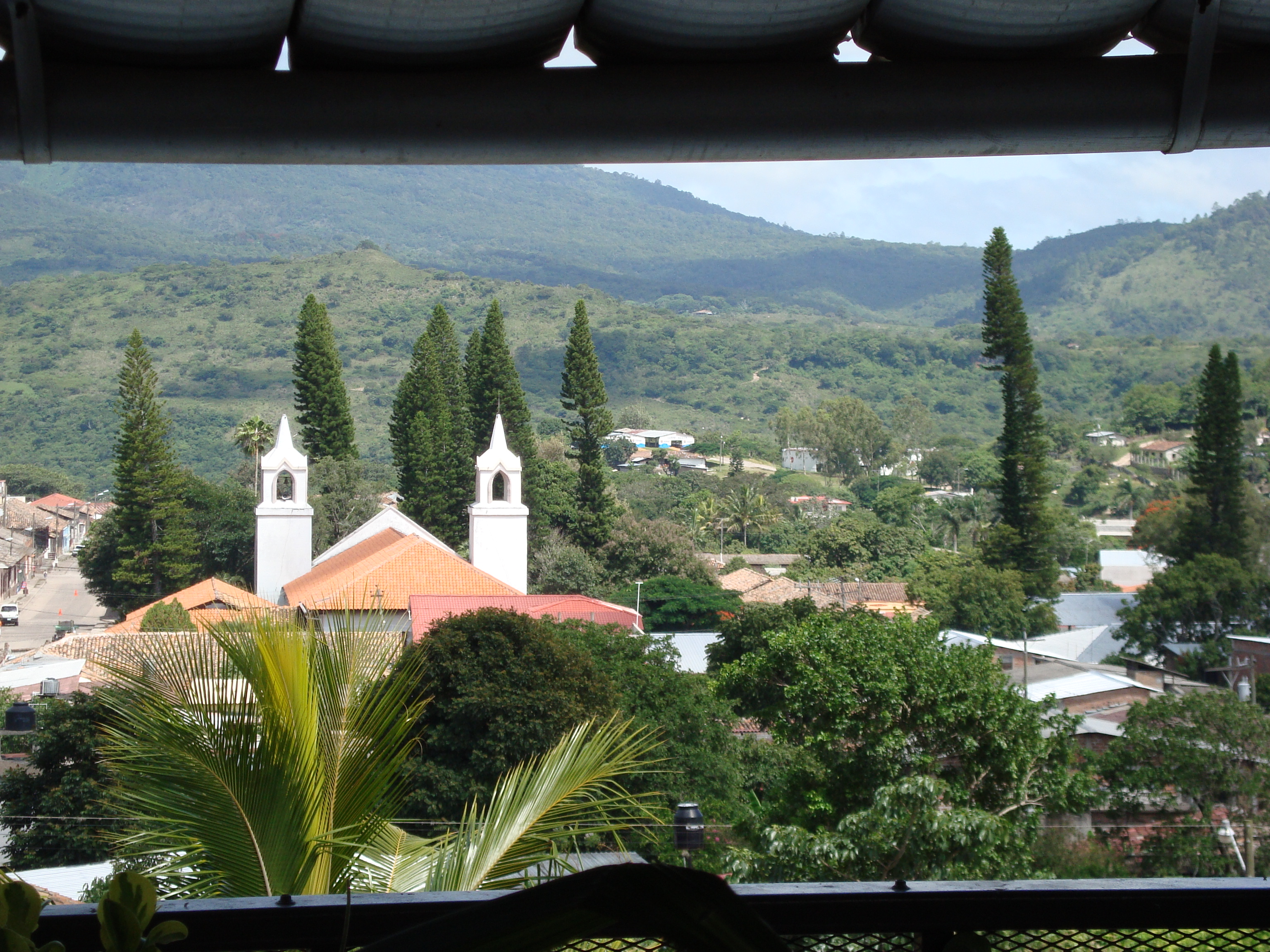
- View of San Marcos de Colón

- Location within Honduras
- Coordinates: 13°16′0″N 86°48′0″W
- Country: Honduras
- Department: Choluteca
- Municipio (County): San Marcos de Colón
- Foundation: 1824

Government
  - Mayor: Douglas Ordóñez (Since January 25th 2010)
  - Vice-mayor: José Jorge Espinal

Area
  - Municipality: 578 km^{2} (223 sq mi)
- Elevation: 960 m (3,150 ft)

Population (2023 projection)
  - Municipality: 32,283
  - Density: 36/km^{2} (93/sq mi)
  - Urban: 15,972
- Time zone: UTC-6

San Marcos de Colón is a town, with a population of 13,920 (2023 calculation), and a municipality in the Honduran department of Choluteca, located on the border with Nicaragua.

The town is located on the Pan-American Highway near the Nicaraguan border town of Somoto, and 192 km away from the capital Tegucigalpa.

== History ==
The town received city status in 1927, though its origins date back to 1795.

== Climate ==
The climate has traditionally been described as tropical. However, due to widespread agricultural deforestation and a higher altitude (3500 to 5000 feet above sea level); the climate can be more aptly described in many cases as temperate. It can be dusty in the dry season (January through March).

== Sports ==
The local football team, Atlético Pinares, played in the second tier of Honduran football until it sold its franchise to Comayagua F.C. in 2012.

== Notable people ==
- Pedro Joaquin Mendoza Caballero (born 1966), painter
