= San Sebastián, Comayagua =

San Sebastián
- Municipality
- Location within Honduras
- Coordinates: 14°15′N 87°38′W
- Country: Honduras
- Department: Comayagua

Area
  - Total: 96 km^{2} (37 sq mi)

Population (2015)
  - Total: 3,637
  - Density: 38/km^{2} (98/sq mi)

San Sebastián is a municipality in the Honduran department of Comayagua.

== History ==
The town was founded on 14 January 1759 under the name El Rincón del Mico, located on the left bank of the Chichiguara River. Later, its inhabitants relocated to the present-day site, renaming it Santo Domingo. On 14 January 1859, it was granted municipal status under the name San Sebastián. At the time, it belonged to the Department of La Paz, but in 1877 it became part of the Department of Comayagua.

Its church was built in 1890. The José Marcial Salinas Bullfighting Arena (Redondel de Arte Taurino José Marcial Salinas) was established in 1991.

== Tourism ==
The town celebrates its patron festival on 20 January in honor of Sebastian of Milan. The municipality is also known for its hot springs, the *Termas de San Sebastián*.
