= Lamaní =

- Municipality
- Location within Honduras
- Coordinates: 14°12′N 87°37′W
- Country: Honduras
- Department: Comayagua

Area
  - Total: 309 km^{2} (119 sq mi)

Population
  - Total: 7,117
  - Density: 23.0/km^{2} (59.7/sq mi)

Lamaní is a municipality in the Honduran department of Comayagua. It is located about 25 minutes from the City of Comayagua, in the vicinity of the Piedra Parada Mountain.

== Overview ==
Many of Lamaní's residents own farms where they raise cows and other livestock. Farmers also cultivate rice, beans, corn, coffee, tomato, cucumbers, and eggplants, among other crops.

Some residents immigrate to the United States to work and provide income to their families. Being a small town, Lamaní immigrants know each other and tend to stay in touch, sometimes forming neighborhoods with a lot of Lamaní immigrants in the United States.

It has recently undergone changes to its physical and communications infrastructure, such as paving of roads, access to the internet, cable television service, etc. They have their own medical clinic and preparatory schools. Some studious residents have turned out to be lawyers, doctors, engineers, and even soccer players, most notably Fernando "Azulejo" Bulnes, who played for Atlético Español of Tegucigalpa in 1965-1966.

== Climate ==
Temperatures can range anywhere within the 32 degrees Celsius range to as low as 4 degrees Celsius.

== Transport ==
Lamaní is to experience further construction, as an international highway is to be built beside the town. This highway is to connect the northern coast of Honduras and continue into El Salvador.

== Events ==
Lamaní has two main festivities throughout the year. Christmas is celebrated throughout 4 days, often hosting bullfights in two town stadiums, simultaneously. One is sanctioned by a private party, the other is sanctioned by the municipality of Lamani. Thousands of people attend these bullfights. The other is called El Dia De La Virgen del Carmen, which celebrates the patron saint of Lamani. It is celebrated much in the same fashion that Christmas is celebrated.
