= Pedro Joaquin Mendoza Caballero =

Pedro Joaquin Mendoza is an artist.

He was born in San Marcos de Colón on September 18, 1966. From a young age he demonstrated his extraordinary painting abilities. He studied in San Marcos, in the southern part of Honduras, and in 1983 he moved to Tegucigalpa with the desire to dedicate himself to professional painting.

== Professional experience ==
1980

- The National Board of Social Wellbeing youth painting competition commemorating the XXII anniversary of the foundation

1986

- The National Board of Social Wellbeing, Presidential Auction Dinner promoting youth art

1987

- Diplomatic auction dinner benefiting the San Jeronimo Emiliani
- National Board of Social Wellbeing Christmas children's auction
- Individual art exposition for the town fair of San Marcos de Colón

1988

- Third national competition “Alvaro Canales” during the inauguration of the Pablo Zelaya National Art Gallery

1989

- Collective exposition at Trios Gallery
- Collective exposition at Classes Gallery in Tegucigalpa
- Collective exposition at Copantl Sula Gallery

1990

- Collective exposition at the National Heritage Headquarters
- Individual exposition at Classes Gallery in Tegucigalpa
- Anthology at the Plastic Arts of Honduras

1991

- Collective exposition in San Pedro Sula at the Copantl Hotel
- Deco Art Gallery in La Ceiba, Atlantida
- Collective exposition in the National Auditorium
- Miniature exposition in I.H.C.I.
- Exposition Ferisur

1992

- Honduras landscape figurines, OEA Tegucigalpa
- Anthology at the Plastic Arts of Honduras
- AEOFFAA, Supporting Arts painting donations

1993

- Landscape and portraits, Banco Atlantida
- Painting exposition for the Costa Rican Women's Associations in Tegucigalpa
- Participation in the painting exposition as an executive committee member at the Southern Fair

1994

- First gathering of plastic arts at Hotel and Club Copantl
- First gathering at grand hall of International
- First gathering of Plastic Arts in San Pedro Sula

1995

- FERISANMC, Santa Ana town fair
- Artistic Project at the honorable Municipal Corporation in Puerto Cortes
- Auction dinner ROTARAC Banco Atlantida
- Homage to an artista, The Chosen Son, San Marcos de Colon

1996

- Sales exposition with Mayor Marlon Lara, Mayor's Office Puerto Cortes
- Rainbow, Tela Railroad Company

1997

- First Honduran/Costa Rican art exposition in Guios Restaurant Roatan
- Miniature exposition in I.H.C.I.

1998

- Auction at the San Miguel de Heredia Rotary Club.
- Four Painters at the Margarita Zepeda Gallery.
- Collective exposition at the American Embassy.

1999

- Three painters/Three styles exposition I.C.H.I. Banco del Pais in San Pedro Sula.
- Inauguration of the Amazon Gallery

2000

- Auction at the San Miguel de Heredia Rotary Club

2001

- Collective exposition at the inauguration of the Berenes Gallery
- Sales exposition in Mall Multiplaza

2002

- Benefit auction in the Medalla Milagrosa Church

2003

- Exposition “An Angel in the Art of Living” San Pedro Sula Hotel Princess
- Cultural journey presenting “Uniting Nations”

2004

- Sales exposition, San Miguel de Heredia Woman's Rotary Club
- Dinner auction, hosted by the I.H.C.I. and the French Alliance, benefitting San Filipe Hospital

2008

- National School of Fine Arts

2010

- Tegucigalpa Woman's Rotary Club committee member, IX festival of painting

2011

- Tegucigalpa Woman's Rotary Club committee member, X festival of Honduran paintings by Benigno Gomez

2012

- Tegucigalpa Woman's Rotary Club committee member, XI festival of Honduran paintings

== International achievements ==
- 1989 – Gulf Stream Galleries Inc, Miami, Florida
- 1992 – Lompie Art Exposition, Geneva, Switzerland
- 1994 – Contemporary Latino Art, Miami, Florida
- 1994 – Museum of Art and History, San Juan, Puerto Rico
- 1995 – New Orleans Encounter, Baton Rouge, Louisiana
- 1996 – University of Florida
- 2002 – Art exposition Barcelona, Spain
- 2002 - Art exposition World Work Organization, Switzerland
- 2003 – Hondurans Prosperous Land, artist
- 2014 – Canadian Art Exposition, Ottawa and Montreal
