= Elvia Alvarado =

Honduran human rights activist

Elvia Alvarado (born 1938) is a Honduran human rights activist who has been involved in several peasant organizations. She became a social activist through the Catholic Church, and organized women movements in Honduran cities to distribute food to malnourished children. She has done extensive work in land recovery, and has been arrested and tortured by police and security forces. Currently she is the head of the International Relations of the Union of Rural Workers.

Alvarado's story is told in the best-selling book translated and edited by Medea Benjamin, Don't Be Afraid Gringo: A Honduran Woman Speaks from the Heart: The Story of Elvia Alvarado (ISBN 0-06-097205-X), as well as in the PBS documentary Elvia and the Fight for Land and Liberty.

== Life ==
=== Childhood ===
Elvia Alvarado was born to her father, a campesino, and her mother, a baker and animal farmer, on January 25, 1938. Elvia grew up in an abusive household, with her mother faced domestic violence. This lasted until her mother decided to take Elvia and her siblings and leave her father, when she was seven years old. She never saw her father again, and he died several years after. Elvia's mother worked long hours in extreme conditions to earn a living, and the children were required to help work when they turned seven. Elvia enjoyed attending church on Sunday's, she recalls it being some of the only times that she was happy during her childhood. Elvia was able to attend school from the age of seven until she was twelve years old, at which point she repeated the second grade several times, since the elementary school she attended did not go past the second grade. By the time Elvia turned thirteen she was on her own since her mother went to live with a man in the town.

Once her mother had left her father, Elvia moved in with her older brother and his wife. She lived with him for two years until she was fifteen and discovered she was pregnant. When Elvia was pregnant, she was instructed by her sister to go to the capital, Tegucigalpa, and find work, since her brother threatened her life due to her pregnancy. Elvia went to Tegucigalpa and was homeless until she found work as a cook for a family in the city. The little she earned there she saved to provide for her baby. Elvia worked right up until her first baby was born and then moved in with one of her sisters in Lejamaní.

=== Motherhood ===
Elvia was taught from a young age that women were meant to have as many children as they can, and that when a woman gets pregnant it is fully her own responsibility. Elvia had two more children with two men that treated her poorly, after her third child Elvia went back to Tegucigalpa to earn money for her family. She worked as a cook this time as well, but the family she worked for did not treat her well, she recalls swapping out her food and the dog's food because the dog ate better than her entire family, the dog was given meat to eat. As she was working here, Elvia moved in with a man named Alberto, who refused to treat her three children as his own and did not provide for them. Elvia and Alberto had three more children together. After fifteen years of living with Alberto, Elvia began working with mothers' clubs that were organized by the Catholic Church.

=== Early activism ===
Elvia started her work in her local church with organizing mothers to distribute donated food to the most needy and malnourished children in the Honduran countryside. After working within the mothers' clubs organized by the Catholic Church, Elvia became the president for her local club. Elvia was invited to a week-long course for social workers to develop their skills as activists, organizers, and leaders. There, Elvia first helped to look at the reality of the Honduran campesinos and looked to organize women to develop food programs for children. Elvia was selected to aid in the effort to create feeding programs throughout Honduras, and she set off to do so. She met resistance from the church when she moved from food distribution to food production through the planting of gardens. The church then stopped offering financial support to the programs once Elvia began gathering construction materials and building roads to enhance the women's work and communication. However, Elvia and others like her did not stop organizing. The women leaders of the program came together to create the Federation of Campesina Women, or the FEHMUC, in 1977. While working here, Elvia discovered the importance of land rights in order to escape poverty, so she began working with the National Campesino Union (UNC), in 1985, and the National Congress of Rural Workers (CNTC).

== Activism in Honduras ==
Elvia Alvarado's first activism started in 1975 when she attended her first land recovery owned by Nicolasa. Shortly after Elvia joined 80 men in returning their land, she was the only woman. Women and children joined the next day, shortly after they were forced out by security cars. She then held another land recovery where they proudly raised the Honduran and Campesino Union flags, which resulted in them being shot at. Elvia joined a position in the CNTC a two-year position, she's a financial secretary for Comayagua. During Ronald Reagan’s presidential era, they sent military forces to Nicaragua. A military plane crashed during the border between Nicaragua and Honduras and killed 52 Hondurans. Elvia protested why no one was asking why the military plane was there, to begin with. This was the first time she got arrested, the "gringos" military pointed a gun to her stomach and took her into custody. She had a newspaper in her backpack in Nicaragua because of this they hung her from the ceiling, and tied her arms and legs. The military assumed she had ties with the Sandinista; they tortured her by beating and kicking her. They took her out in the middle of the night, where she thought they were going to kill her and dispose of her body without anyone knowing. One of the men tried to rape her however, she screamed and kicked which backed them off. She was finally released by the DNI due to her daughter protesting and marching for hours for Elvia’s release.

Elvia also protested Article 33 which is an anti-terrorist law that was passed even after the numerous protests against this law. Another time Elvia got arrested was with her campesino partner Emilio, she was released by the DNI and immediately went back to return to release Emilio. In 1983 a genocide of groups was killed and campesinos were blamed also connected back to connected by guerrillas. The military killed many of them, which led to a massive protest in 1986 with nearly 500 campesinos going to Congress and the prisons to protest.

In a meeting, Elvia was in, two men from Europe joined and heard Elvia write of the struggles she and campesinos were facing. The two men cried of how powerful her message was portraying, and then she learned that they were from the United States and how they did not support former president Reagan's actions towards Latin American countries. In total Elvia was arrested 6 times and was tortured by the Honduran military, she never abandoned campesinos nor stopped the fight for equality throughout all of Honduras. After Elvia gained fame for her activism, she went on numerous tours all over the world, specifically in the United States. In the US she organized these tours to educate communities on the situations that Honduras was facing with their peasants and how the US military was responsible for that pain.
