= Lejamaní =

- Municipality
- Location within Honduras
- Coordinates: 14°22′N 87°42′W
- Country: Honduras
- Department: Comayagua

Area
  - Total: 22 km^{2} (8.5 sq mi)

Population (2015)
  - Total: 5,781
  - Density: 260/km^{2} (680/sq mi)

Lejamaní is one of the 21 municipalities in the Honduran department of Comayagua.

== History ==
The municipality began as a town entrusted to Don Felipe II, King of Spain in 1630.
