= List of Honduran departments by Human Development Index =

This is a list of Honduran departments by Human Development Index as of 2022.

Rank	Department	HDI (2022)
Medium human development
1	Francisco Morazán	0.681
2	Cortés	0.666
3	Bay Islands	0.655
4	Atlántida	0.630
–	Honduras	0.624
5	Yoro	0.612
6	Comayagua	0.609
7	Colón	0.603
8	La Paz	0.597
9	Santa Bárbara	0.596
10	Valle	0.592
10	Ocotepeque	0.592
12	El Paraíso	0.588
13	Choluteca	0.586
14	Olancho	0.581
15	Copán	0.575
16	Intibucá	0.573
17	Gracias a Dios	0.552
Low human development
18	Lempira	0.547
