= La Libertad, Comayagua =

Municipalities in Comayagua Department, Honduras

Coordinates: 14°45′0″N 87°37′0″W

La Libertad (Spanish pronunciation: [la liβeɾˈtað]) is a municipality in the Honduran department of Comayagua.
