= San José del Potrero =

- Municipality
- Location within Honduras
- Coordinates: 14°50′N 87°17′W
- Country: Honduras
- Department: Comayagua

Area
  - Total: 199 km^{2} (77 sq mi)

Population (2015)
  - Total: 6,911
  - Density: 34.7/km^{2} (89.9/sq mi)

San José del Potrero is a municipality in the Honduran department of Comayagua.
