= Esquías =

- Municipality
- Location within Honduras
- Coordinates: 14°44′N 87°22′W
- Country: Honduras
- Department: Comayagua

Area
  - Total: 391 km^{2} (151 sq mi)

Population (2015)
  - Total: 21,009
  - Density: 53.7/km^{2} (139/sq mi)

Esquías is a municipality in the Honduran department of Comayagua.
