= San Luis, Comayagua =

San Luis
- Municipality
- Location within Honduras
- Coordinates: 14°45′N 87°25′W
- Country: Honduras
- Department: Comayagua

Area
  - Total: 122 km^{2} (47 sq mi)

Population (2015)
  - Total: 11,404
  - Density: 93.5/km^{2} (242/sq mi)

San Luis is a municipality in the Honduran department of Comayagua.

On November 24, 2013, the Liberal Party candidate and the National Party candidate were tied for the mayoralty of San Luis, Comayagua. Since then and in the inauguration of the actual period (on January 25, 2014), there has been no mayor.
