= Taulabé =

- Municipality
- Flag Coat of arms

- Location within Honduras
- Coordinates: 14°42′N 87°58′W
- Country: Honduras
- Department: Comayagua

Area
  - Total: 219.6 km^{2} (84.8 sq mi)

Population (2013)
  - Total: 24,235
  - Density: 110.4/km^{2} (285.8/sq mi)

Taulabé is a municipality in the department of Comayagua in Honduras. It covers an area of 219.6 km^{2} (84.8 sq mi) and had a population of 24,235 inhabitants according to the 2013 census.

== History ==
In 1582, the indigenous people who resided in the Tencoa Valley, along the banks of the Ulúa River migrated and settled on the banks of the Tamalito River. During the Spanish colonial occupation, it became a trading center with the native population in the central Honduras. Hence, Taulabé is derived from Lenca language word "Tarule" or "Taulepa", which translates to "meeting place of roads and travelers". After Honduran independence in 1821, there was significant migration to the town from other parts of the country, and in 1864, they purchased land from the government for settlement. In 1969, the construction of Northern Highway, a main arterial road, began, and helped in the commercial development of the region. Till 1987, it was part of the municipality of Siguatepeque, and it was established as a new municipality on 20 May 1987.

== Geography ==
Taulabe is located in the department of Comayagua in Honduras. The municipality covers an area of 219.6 km^{2} (84.8 sq mi).

Taulabe has a tropical monsoon climate (Köppen climate classification: Am). The municipality has an average annual temperature of 23.23 °C (73.81 °F) and typically receives about 268.77 mm (10.581 in) of annual precipitation.

== Administrative divisions ==
The municipality comprises 24 aldeas (villages) and their associated caseríos (hamlets).

Aldeas of Taulabé
Aldea	Total Population	Men	Women
Taulabé	5,620	2,588	3,032
Buena Vista de Varsovia	409	226	183
Buenos Aires	557	269	288
Camalotales	1,120	580	540
Cerro Azul No.1	563	274	289
Choloma	20	14	6
El Carrizal	1,897	913	984
El Cerrón	547	283	264
El Palmichal o La Fátima	974	501	473
Jaitique	1,608	807	801
Jardines	1,929	955	974
La Angostura	682	344	338
La Misión	930	447	483
La Unión de San Antonio	560	278	282
Las Alejandras	395	203	192
Las Conchas	1,175	544	631
Las Lajas	941	469	472
Montañuelas	400	205	195
Ocomán	733	366	367
Quebraditas	387	194	193
San Antonio de Yure	240	127	113
Terrero Blanco	465	238	227
Vacadilla	1,359	650	709
Varsovia	723	367	356
Total	24,235	11,842	12,393

== Demographics ==
According to the 2013 census, Taulabé had a total population of 24,235 inhabitants, of whom 11,842 (48.9%) were men and 12,393 (51.1%) were women. About 7,033 (29.0%) of the population was classified as urban and 17,202 residents (71.0%) lived in the rural areas.

By broad age group, 8,746 individuals (36.1%) were aged 0–14 years, 14,073 individuals (58.1%) were aged 15–64 (consisting of 11,968 individuals aged 15–49 and 2,105 individuals aged 50–64), and 1,416 individuals (5.8%) were aged 65 years and over. The median age was 20.8 years and the mean age was 25.8 years. Among the population aged 15 and over, the municipality recorded an illiteracy rate of 14.8%, slightly higher than the departmental average of 14.6%. The municipality had 5,503 occupied private dwellings, with an average of 4.3 persons per occupied dwelling.

The economy is dependent on agriculture and major produce include lemon, sugercane, and coffee. Livestock rearing and honey collection are also prevalent in the region.
