= Morolica =

- Municipality
- Location in Honduras
- Coordinates: 13°34′N 86°54′W
- Country: Honduras
- Department: Choluteca

Government
  - Mayor: Ever Gómez

Morolica is a municipality in the Honduran department of Choluteca.

Founded in the late 19th century, Morolica was destroyed by flooding associated with Hurricane Mitch in October 1998. The current Morolica, also known as New Morolica, is located in a valley some five kilometers from the original site.

The current mayor is Ever Gomez of the Liberal Party. As of 2023, the city has a population of 5472 people.

Morolica possesses four churches: Evangelical, Baptist, Pentecostal, and Catholic.

The main industry is farming. Possessing a kindergarten, elementary school, high school, public library, court, health center, census office, and mayor's office, the largest employer is the government.
