= Choluteca Department =

Coordinates: 13°19′N 87°13′W

Choluteca Department Departamento de Choluteca
- Department
- Location of Choluteca in Honduras
- Country: Honduras
- Municipalities: 16
- Villages: 198
- Founded: June 28, 1825 (Note: Choluteca was one of the first 7 departments in which the national territory was divided in the first political division of Honduras in 1825.)
- Capital city: Choluteca

Government
  - Governor: Ilse Villatoro (2022–2026) (LibRe)

Area
  - Total: 4,397 km^{2} (1,698 sq mi)

Population (2015)
  - Total: 447,852
  - Density: 101.9/km^{2} (263.8/sq mi)

GDP (Nominal, 2015 US dollar)
  - Total: $1.0 billion (2023)
  - Per capita: $1,800 (2023)

GDP (PPP, 2015 int. dollar)
  - Total: $2.0 billion (2023)
  - Per capita: $3,800 (2023)
- Time zone: UTC+6 (CDT)
- Postal code: 51101, 51201
- ISO 3166 code: HN-CH
- HDI (2021): 0.583 medium · 13th of 18
- Statistics derived from Consult INE online database: Population and Housing Census 2013

Choluteca is one of the 18 departments (departamentos) into which Honduras is divided. The departmental capital is the city of Choluteca. The Choluteca River runs through the department.

== History ==
In the Mesoamerican Classic period, the indigenous Cholutecas were engaged in trade in a vast territory encompassing the south of Mexico, Belize, Guatemala, parts of El Salvador and Nicaragua. In the exercise of this industry they reached the South Coast of Honduras, and founded the settlement of what is now the city of Choluteca hundreds of years before the Spanish conquest.

Choluteca was created as a division of colonial rule from Guatemala in March 1535. Upon independence from Spain, the department of Choluteca was created on June 28, 1825, as one of the seven original departments in which Honduras was divided after independence during the government of the first head of state of Honduras, Dionisio de Herrera. Its borders were changed twice after the original partition. In 1843 the district of Guascorán was added to its territory, until then part of Comayagua. In 1893 its westernmost part was split, with the creation of the Valle department.

== Geography ==
Choluteca is the southernmost department of Honduras with an area of 4360 km^{2}. In 2015 it had an estimated population of 447,852 inhabitants. Chuleteca has many lands that are used for agriculture, fishing, sugar production, and shrimp farms. The head of the department is the city of Choluteca, which is located on the Choluteca river that crosses the department. One crosses the Choluteca Bridge to enter the city.

Choluteca is bordered to the north by the departments of Francisco Morazán and El Paraíso, to the west by the Golfo de Fonseca and the department of Valle, and to the east and south by Nicaragua.

== Governance ==
=== Municipalities ===
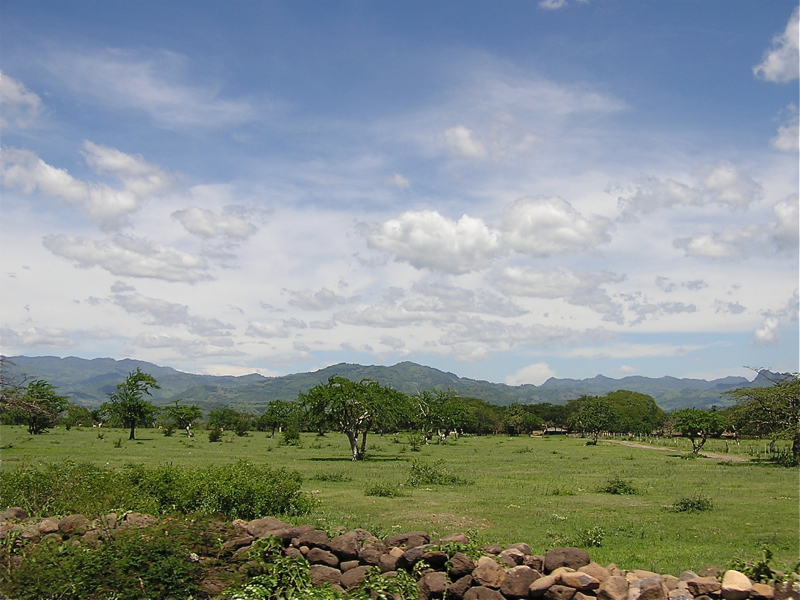
Rural Choluteca Department.

1. Apacilagua
2. Choluteca
3. Concepción de María
4. Duyure
5. El Corpus
6. El Triunfo
7. Marcovia
8. Morolica
9. Namasigüe
10. Orocuina
11. Pespire
12. San Antonio de Flores
13. San Isidro
14. San José
15. San Marcos de Colón
16. Santa Ana de Yusguare

=== Deputies ===
The Choluteca Department has a number of 9 deputies elected for the National Congress.

National Congress Deputies 2018–2022
Deputy	Department	Party
Mauricio Oliva	Choluteca	PNH
Carlos Ledezma	Choluteca	PNH
Clara Laínez	Choluteca	PNH
Selvin Rueda	Choluteca	PNH
María Bardales	Choluteca	PNH
Yuri Sabas	Choluteca	PLH
Carlos Lara	Choluteca	PLH
Luis Martínez	Choluteca	Libre
David Reyes	Choluteca	PINU-SD

== Economy ==
The department is, historically, a prominent producer of gold, silver, and copper. The region also had a cattle industry.
