= Travesía =

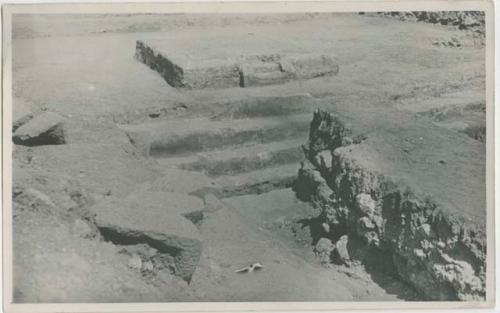
View to the ruins being excavated in 1937.

Travesía also known as Ulua-Yoja s is an important pre-Columbian archaeological sites in the Ulua river valley of Honduras.

== History ==
The city reached its largest size in the Late Classic (500-850) but was founded earlier. How early, we don't know because of the destruction of the site in the 20th century and subsequent looting to find pieces for the thriving illegal antiquities market. It is in the Cortés Department to the south east of San Pedro Sula, and should not be confused with the modern town of Travesía on the Caribbean coast.

Doris Stone excavated in the city center of Travesía. Her photos of those excavations can be found in the photo archives of the Peabody Museum of Harvard University. Some of what she found is published in her book, The Archaeology of the North Coast of Honduras (1941).

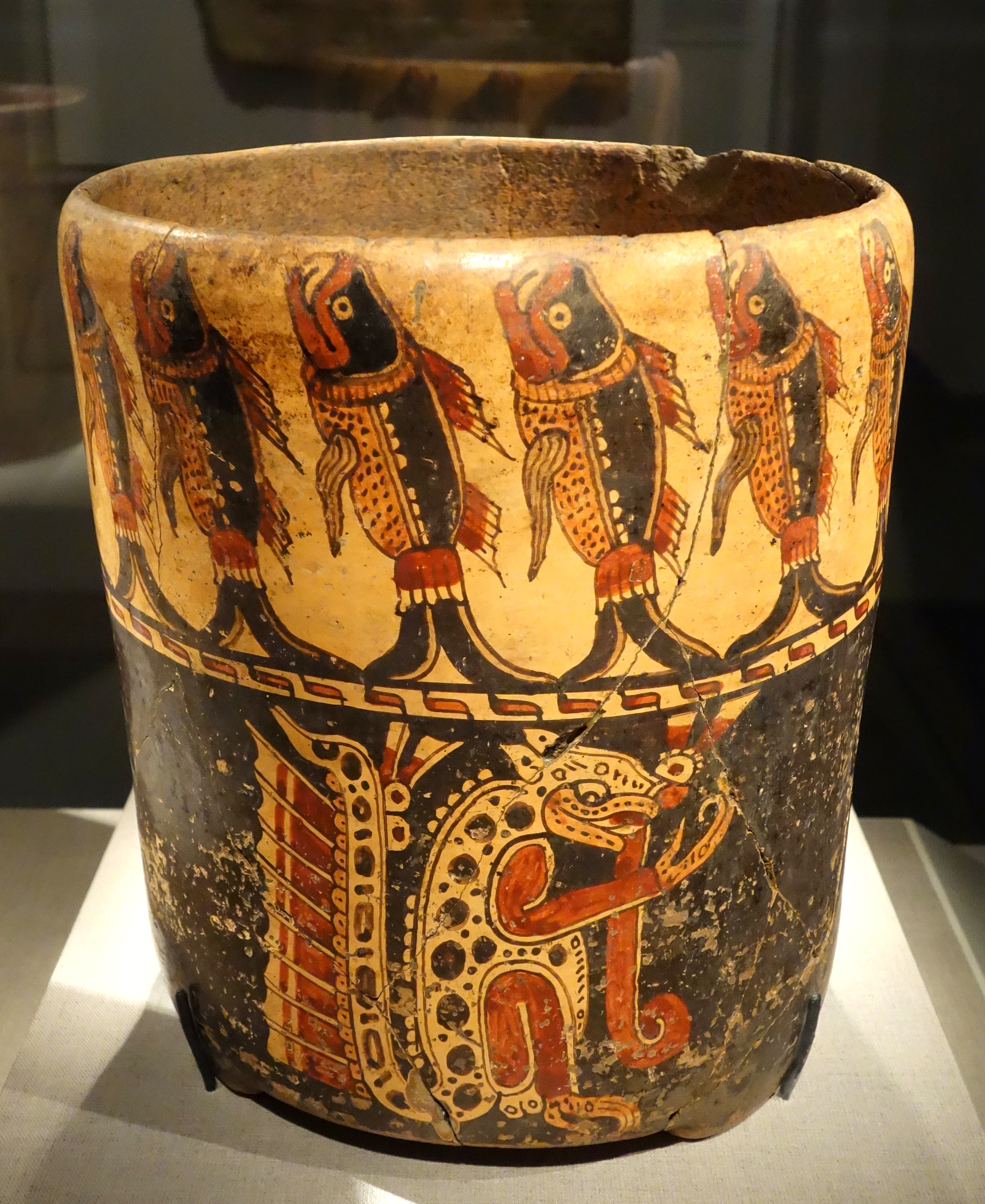
Vessel with jaguars and fish that shown the Maya influence in Honduras.

The site itself is known for its abundant Ulua polychrome pottery, and especially for the Ulua marble vessels. Christina Luke studied the marble vessels in her Cornell University dissertation and her report listed below on the FAMSI website. Some of this vessels have been rescued and preserved in museums in Honduras.

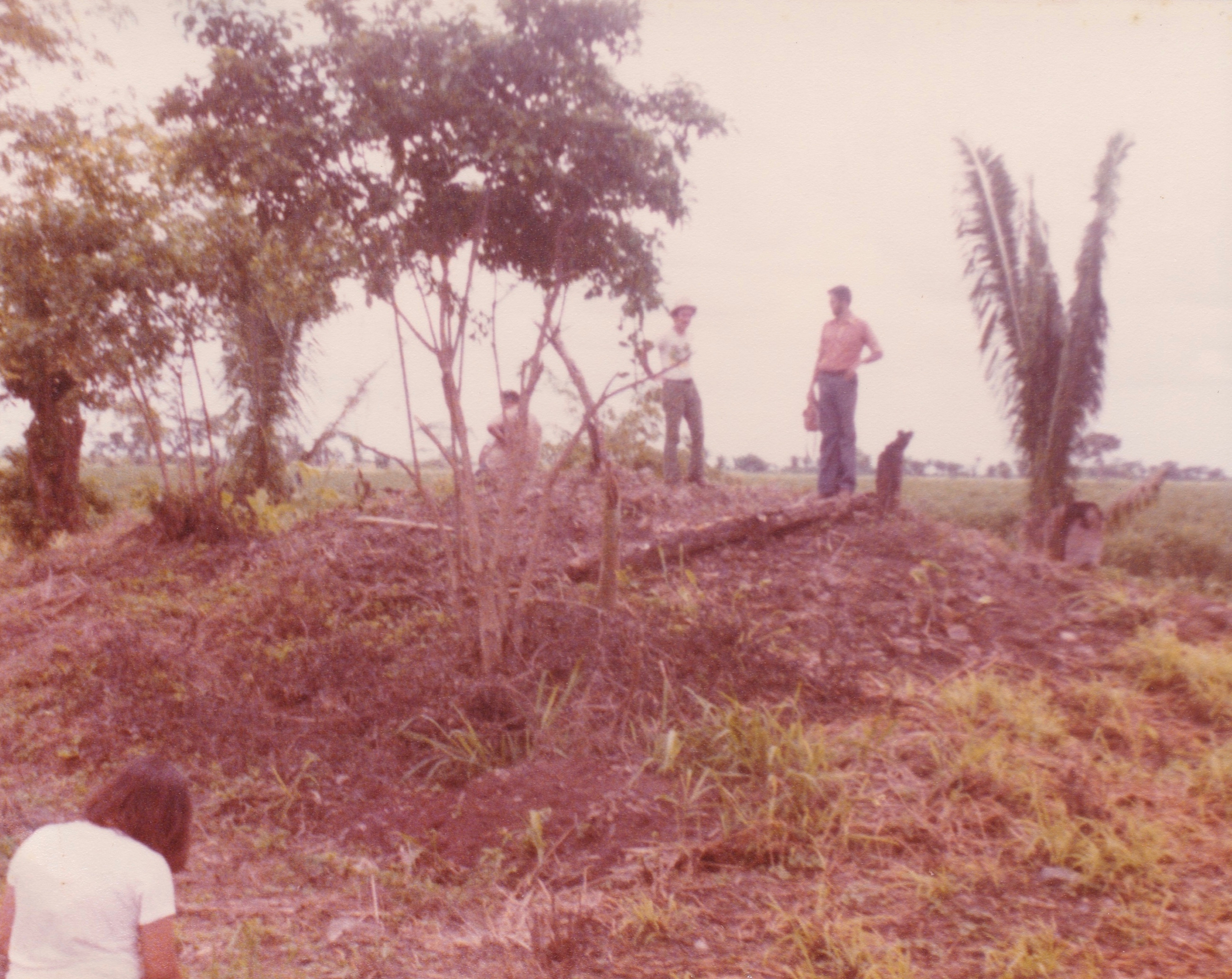
Surface survey at the remains of la Travesía, 1980

Research by Rus Sheptak in 1981 using aerial photography showed that the site apparently consisted of 3 large raised platforms over 100 meters on a side. One of these platforms contained the city center, a plaza and ball-court made of cut stone architecture and plaster.

Its here that Doris Stone excavated. The other platforms weren't investigating. In the 1940s the site was destroyed as part of a project to flatten the fields to plant sugar cane. Subsequently, the site has been heavily looted to collect the polychrome pots and marble vessels prized on the national and international antiquities markets.

== Preservation ==
Until 2004 these regularly appeared for sale on sites like eBay, Christie's, and Sotheby's. Archaeologists have tried to place test excavations at Travesia to get information on how far back it was occupied, but frequently end up re-excavating a looter's pit rather than undisturbed soil.

In a 2002 letter to the U.S. Cultural Property Advisory Committee (CPAC), the president of the Society for American Archaeology (SAA) noted that "...the major center of Travesia has all but disappeared from the map under the looter's shovel." In March 2004, the U.S. Government imposed import restrictions on all precolumbian Honduran materials, being penalized with the law for theft of Honduran historical heritage.

== See also ==
- Honduras History
- Pre-columbian Honduras
