= Comayagua Department =

Comayagua
- Department
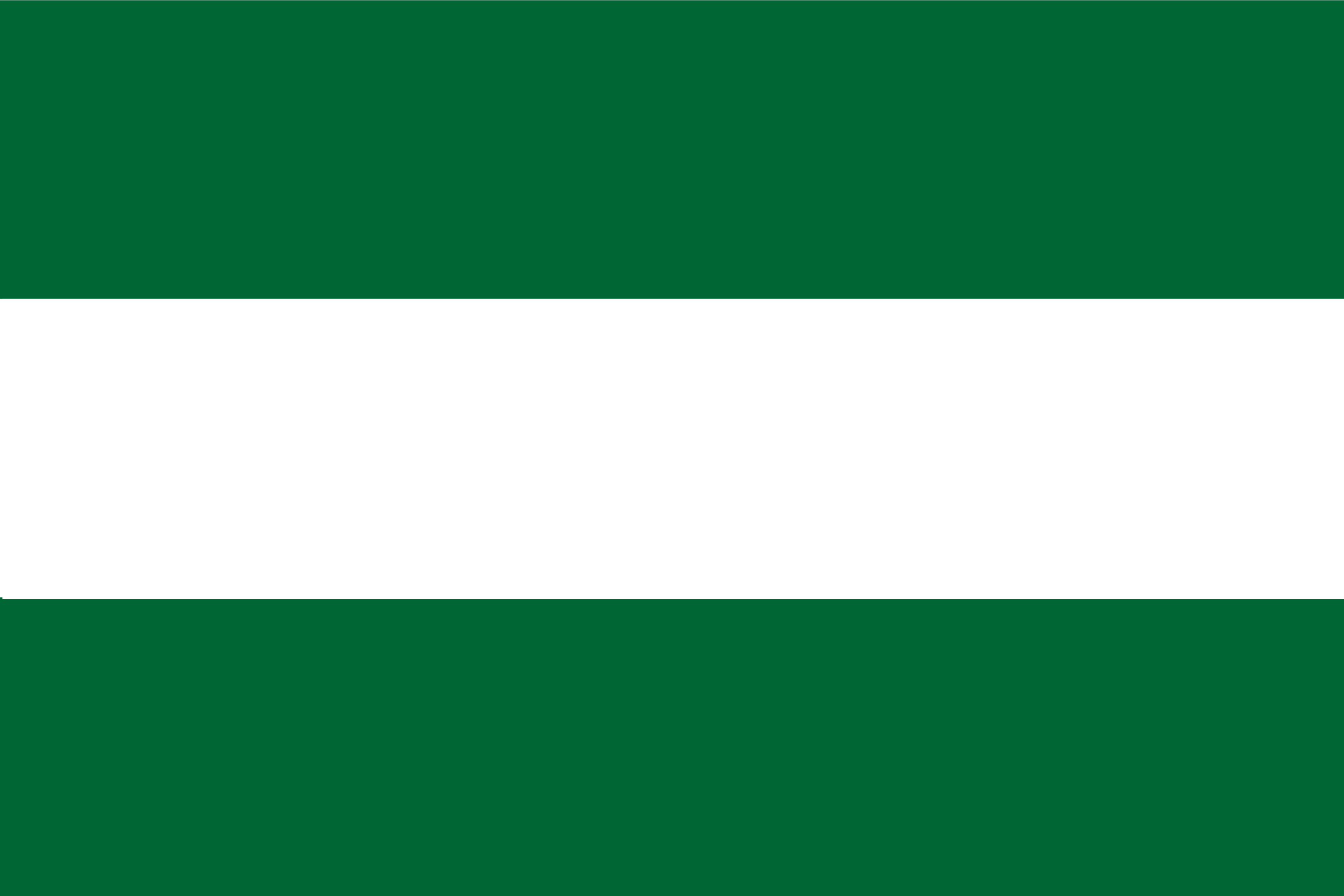
- Flag

- Coordinates: 14°27′N 87°38′W
- Country: Honduras
- Municipalities: 21
- Villages: 281
- Founded: 28 June 1825 (Note: Comayagua was one of the first 7 departments in which the national territory was divided in the first political division of Honduras in 1825.)
- Seat: Comayagua

Government
  - Type: Departmental
  - Governor: Gredis Cardona Alvarez (2022-2026, LibRe)

Area
  - Total: 5,120 km^{2} (1,980 sq mi)

Population (2015)
  - Total: 511,943
  - Density: 100/km^{2} (259/sq mi)

GDP (Nominal, 2015 US dollar)
  - Total: $1.6 billion (2023)
  - Per capita: $2,400 (2023)

GDP (PPP, 2015 int. dollar)
  - Total: $3,3 billion (2023)
  - Per capita: $5,100 (2023)
- Time zone: UTC-6 (CDT)
- Postal code: 12101
- ISO 3166 code: HN-CM
- HDI (2021): 0.606 medium · 6th of 18
- Statistics derived from Consult INE online database: Population and Housing Census 2013

Comayagua (Spanish pronunciation: [komaˈʝaɣwa]) is one of the 18 departments (departamentos) into which Honduras is divided. The departmental capital is Comayagua.

== Geography ==
The department covers a total surface area of 5,124 km^{2} and, in 2015, had an estimated population of 511,943 people.

== Economy ==
Historically, the department produced gold, copper, cinnabar, asbestos, and silver. Gems were also mined, including opal and emerald. The area was also known for "fine" cattle.

== Municipalities ==
1. Ajuterique
2. Comayagua
3. El Rosario
4. Esquías
5. Humuya
6. La Libertad
7. Lamaní
8. Las Lajas
9. La Trinidad
10. Lejamaní
11. Meámbar
12. Minas de Oro
13. Ojos de Agua
14. San Jerónimo
15. San José de Comayagua
16. San José del Potrero
17. San Luis
18. San Sebastián
19. Siguatepeque
20. Taulabé
21. Villa de San Antonio
