= Departments of Honduras =

First-level administrative division of Honduras

Departments of Honduras

Honduras is divided into 18 departments (Spanish: departamentos). Each department is headed by a governor, who is appointed by the President of Honduras. The governor represents the executive branch in the region in addition to acting as intermediary between municipalities and various national authorities; resolves issues arising between municipalities; oversees the penitentiaries and prisons in his department; and regularly works with the various Secretaries of State that form the President's Cabinet. To be eligible for appointment as a governor, the individual must: a) live for five consecutive years in the department; b) be Honduran; c) be older than 18 years of age and; d) know how to read and write.

== Evolution of Honduras's territorial organization ==
A historical timelapse of the formation of Honduran departments

- 1825: The constitutional congress convened in that year orders that the state be divided into seven departments: Comayagua, Santa Bárbara, Tegucigalpa, Choluteca, Yoro, Olancho, and Gracias (later renamed Lempira).
- 1834: An extraordinary constitutional assembly reduces the number of departments to four: this attempt fails to prosper, and the 1825 division remains in force.
- 1869: Congress orders the creation of the departments of La Paz (broken away from Comayagua), El Paraíso (from Tegucigalpa and Olancho), Copán (from Gracias), and La Mosquitia (from Yoro).
- 1872: A department called Victoria is ordered to be split from Choluteca, but this never comes into effect. Islas de la Bahía department is founded (the islands were ceded to Honduras by the United Kingdom in 1860).
- 1881: La Mosquitia joined with portions of Yoro to form Colón department.
- 1883: Intibucá department is formed from sections of La Paz and Gracias.
- 1893: Valle department (split from Choluteca) and Cortés department (split from Santa Bárbara) are created.
- 1902: Parts of Yoro and Colón are taken to form the new department of Atlántida.
- 1906: Ocotepeque department is created by dividing the territory of Copán.
- 1957: Colón is divided in two to create Gracias a Dios department.

== Departments of Honduras ==
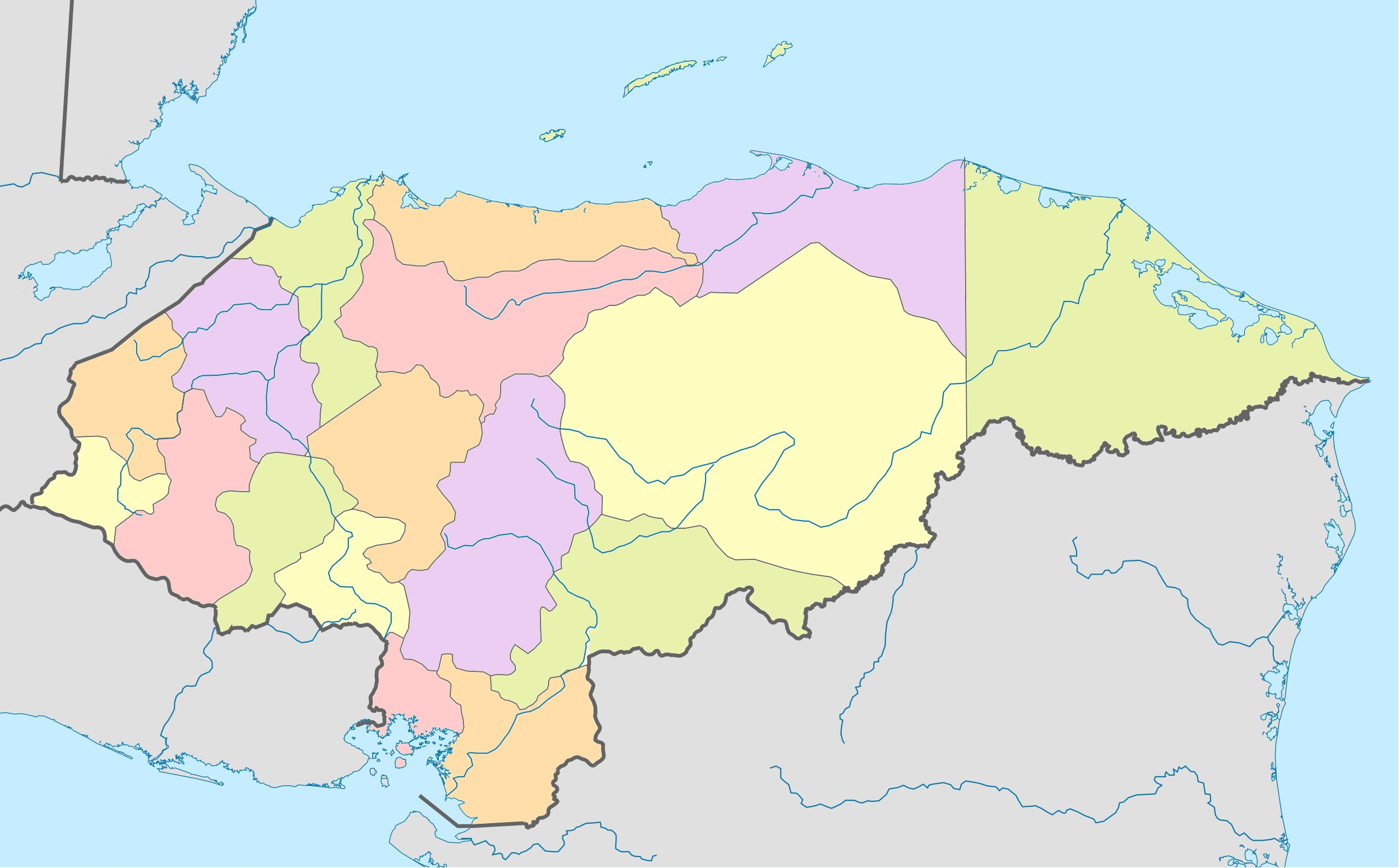

	Department	Department capital	Population			Area (km^{2})	Population density (2013)	Municipalities
	Department	Department capital	2001 census	2013 census	Change (%)	Area (km^{2})	Population density (2013)	Municipalities
1.	Atlántida	La Ceiba	344,099	436,252	▲18.44	4,372	99.8	8
2.	Bay Islands	Roatán	38,073	62,557	▲17.48	229	273.1	16
3.	Choluteca	Choluteca	390,805	437,618	▲18.98	4,397	99.5	10
4.	Colón	Trujillo	246,708	309,926	▲25.33	8,276	37.4	21
5.	Comayagua	Comayagua	352,881	493,466	▲25.44	5,120	96.3	23
6.	Copán	Santa Rosa de Copán	288,766	371,057	▲30.58	3,239	114.5	12
7.	Cortés	San Pedro Sula	1,202,510	1,562,394	▲22.05	3,911	60.8	18
8.	El Paraíso	Yuscarán	350,054	455,507	▲21.44	7,218	175.1	28
9.	Francisco Morazán	Tegucigalpa	1,180,676	1,508,906	▲31.06	8,580	175.8	6
10.	Gracias a Dios	Puerto Lempira	67,384	90,765	▲29.27	15,876	5.9	17
11.	Intibucá	La Esperanza	179,862	232,553	▲29.12	3,126	74.4	4
12.	La Paz	La Paz	156,560	198,926	▲25.40	2,534	78.5	19
13.	Lempira	Gracias	250,067	321,179	▲26.19	4,285	74.9	28
14.	Ocotepeque	Ocotepeque	108,029	146,030	▲22.61	1,630	89.6	17
15.	Olancho	Juticalpa	419,561	520,761	▲21.45	24,057	21.6	23
16.	Santa Bárbara	Santa Bárbara	342,054	421,337	▲17.63	5,024	83.9	28
17.	Valle	Nacaome	151,841	174,511	▲13.02	1,665	104.8	9
18.	Yoro	Yoro	465,414	570,595	▲18.63	7,781	73.3	11
Total	–	–	6,535,344	8,303,771	▲27.06	112,457	73.9	298

Population data source:

== See also ==
- Municipalities of Honduras
- List of Honduras-related topics
- List of Honduran departments by Human Development Index
- ISO 3166-2:HN
