= Sula Valley =

Valley in Yoro Department, Honduras

Coordinates: 15.4500°N 87.8500°W

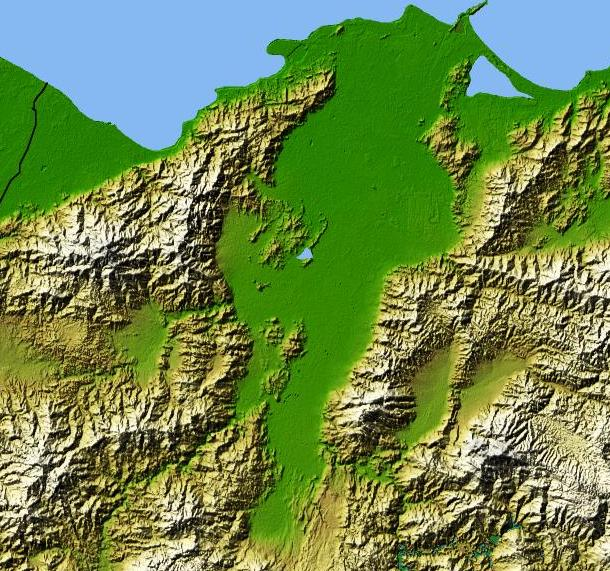
A satellite image of the valley

The Valley of Sula (also, Sula Valley) is the largest alluvial valley of Honduras. It is located in the northwest of the country, and within it lie several of Honduras's most important cities, such as San Pedro Sula, El Progreso, Choloma, Puerto Cortés, Villanueva, and Tela.

Hydrologically speaking, the area has two of the most important basins of Honduras: the basins of the Ulúa and Chamelecón rivers, leaving the area vulnerable to flooding, mainly in the rainy season.

The valley's ecosystem is mainly composed of tropical dry forests.

== Economy ==
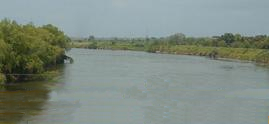
Yearly flooding can cause considerable damage to the plantations located within the valley.

The valley's fertile soils have boosted its agricultural development.

Around 65% of the Gross domestic product of Honduras is generated in the valley, representing over 50% of the country's exports. Within it resides roughly 30% of the national population, due to the high concentration of the workforce, both in urban and rural communities.

== Municipalities of the Sula Valley ==
Municipality	Department	Population	Area
San Pedro Sula	Cortés	801,259	856 km^{2}
Choloma	Cortés	275,724	467 km^{2}
Villanueva	Cortés	177,699	349 km^{2}
Puerto Cortés	Cortés	136,081	383 km^{2}
Santa Cruz de Yojoa	Cortés	92,746	734 km^{2}
La Lima	Cortés	84,102	112 km^{2}
San Manuel	Cortés	68,435	141 km^{2}
Omoa	Cortés	53,771	394 km^{2}
Potrerillos	Cortés	25,960	99.4 km^{2}
San Francisco de Yojoa	Cortés	24,740	98.7 km^{2}
San Antonio de Cortés	Cortés	22,884	221 km^{2}
Pimienta	Cortés	21,975	55.4 km^{2}
El Progreso	Yoro	200,010	534 km^{2}
El Negrito	Yoro	49,196	565 km^{2}
Santa Rita	Yoro	21,208	129 km^{2}
Quimistán	Santa Bárbara	60,047	745.3 km^{2}
Petoa	Santa Bárbara	12,000	213 km^{2}
Tela	Atlántida	106,136	1156 km^{2}
Total	Valley of Sula	2,033,365	7,384.6 km^{2}

== See also ==
- River Ulúa
- River Chamelecón
