= Ilama, Honduras =

Ilama
- Municipality
- Location within Honduras
- Coordinates: 15°04′N 88°13′W
- Country: Honduras
- Department: Santa Bárbara
- Municipal charter: 1795

Area
  - Municipality: 179.4 km^{2} (69.3 sq mi)
- Elevation: 298 m (978 ft)

Population (2013)
  - Municipality: 9,058
  - Density: 50.49/km^{2} (130.8/sq mi)
  - Urban: 2,117
  - Rural: 6,941

Ilama is a municipality in the department of Santa Bárbara, Honduras. It covers an area of 179.4 km^{2} (69.3 sq mi) and had a population of 9,058 inhabitants as per the 2013 national census. It is situated near the Ulúa River.

== History ==
The municipality was formerly known as "Ilamatepeque", a name derived from Nahuatl meaning "hill of the old woman" (cerro de la vieja in Spanish). As per the documents found in the municipal archives, the municipal charter of Ilama was established on 31 December 1795. The document records the election of the first municipal officers in the ciudad de San Cristóbal de Ilamatepeque. The patron saint of Ilama is the Virgin of Lourdes, and the annual patron feast (feria patronal) is celebrated from 1 to 12 February each year.

== Geography ==
Ilama is located in the department of Santa Bárbara, Honduras. It is situated on highlands off the Ulúa River. The municipality borders the municipalities of Chinda and Trinidad to the north, Santa Bárbara to the south, San Francisco de Yojoa and San Antonio de Cortés to the east, and San José de Colinas and Gualala to the west. It occupies an area of 179.4 km^{2} (69.3 sq mi), and an average altitude of 298 m (978 ft).

== Administrative divisions ==
The municipality comprises 13 aldeas (villages) and their associated caseríos (hamlets).

Aldeas (villages) of Ilama
Aldea	Population	Men	Women
Ilama (municipal seat)	2,707	1,317	1,391
San José de Oriente	1,710	943	767
La Cañada	965	537	428
San Vicente de las Nieves	670	376	294
La Estancia	647	325	323
La Fe	555	313	242
San Juan de la Cruz	436	250	186
La Montañita	254	142	112
La Mica	229	120	109
Uncana	260	140	120
La Cuchilla	275	161	114
Cececapa	240	123	117
Agua Zarca	109	64	45
Total	9,058	4,809	4,249

== Demographics ==
At the time of the 2013 census, Ilama had a total population of 9,058 inhabitants of whom 4,809 (53.1%) were male and 4,249 (46.9%) were female with a sex ratio of 113.2 men per 100 women. Of the total population, 2,117 (23.4%) lived in the urban and 6,941 (76.6%) in the rural areas. By age group, 34.7% of the population were aged 0–14, 58.3% were aged 15–64, and 7.1% were aged 65 and over. The median age was 22.6 years and the mean age was 27.6 years. Among the population aged 15 and over, the 2013 census recorded a literacy rate of 74.6%.

There were 2,603 private dwellings in the municipality, of which 2,155 were occupied. The average household size in occupied private dwellings was 4.2 persons. Of the private dwellings, 2,462 (94.6%) were classified as independent houses (casas independientes), and 1,819 (84.4%) were owner-occupied, 99 (4.6%) were rented, and 193 (9.0%) were borrowed or ceded without payment. Of the occupied private dwellings, 1,854 (86%) obtained water from the public system, 92 (4.3%) from wells, and 73 (3.4%) from other sources. About 1,629 (75.6%) had access to electric lighting, of which 1,375 were connected to the public electricity system.

== See also ==
- Santa Bárbara Department, Honduras
- Municipalities of Honduras
