= Chinda =

- Municipality
- Location in Honduras
- Coordinates: 15°07′N 88°12′W
- Country: Honduras
- Department: Santa Bárbara
- Villages: 10

Area
  - Total: 68.4 km^{2} (26.4 sq mi)

Population (2013)
  - Total: 4,702
  - Density: 68.7/km^{2} (178/sq mi)
- Climate: Aw

Chinda is a municipality in the department of Santa Bárbara, Honduras. It covers an area of 68.4 km^{2} (26.4 sq mi) and had a population of 4,702 inhabitants according to the 2013 national census.

== History ==
The settlement of Chinda has existed since the late 17th century, and in the 1791 population census, Chinda was mentioned as a settlement under the parish of Petoa. In 1868, the municipality of Chinda was officially established by a decree by President José María Medina. The word "Chinda" is derived from the Nahuatl word "Chitatle" meaning "red".

== Geography ==
Chinda is located in the department of Santa Bárbara in Honduras. It borders the municipalities of Concepción del Norte and Trinidad to the north, Ilama to the south, San Antonio de Cortes to the east, and Trinidad to the west. It is located on the left bank of the Ulúa River in the Chinda Valley. The municipality covers an area of 68.7 km^{2} (26.5 sq mi) and has a mean altitude of 165 m (541 ft) above mean sea level.

== Administrative divisions ==
The municipality comprises ten aldeas (villages) and their associated caseríos (hamlets).

Aldeas (villages) of Chinda
Aldea	Population	Men	Women
Chinda	1,183	596	587
Barrio Nuevo o Chiquiguite	200	102	98
El Limón	357	186	171
El Retiro	282	146	136
El Tule	469	236	233
La Brea	992	513	479
La Cuchilla	182	98	84
Platanares	263	131	132
Río Cañas	59	30	29
San Rafael	715	371	344
Total	4,702	2,408	2,294

== Demographics ==
At the 2013 census, Chinda had a total population of 4,702 inhabitants, of whom 2,408 (51.2%) were male and 2,293 (48.8%) were female, with a masculinity index of 105.0 men per 100 women. The entire population was classified as rural, with no urban population recorded in the census. The population density was 68.74 inhabitants per square kilometre, and the intercensal population growth rate between the 2001 and 2013 census was 0.7%.

About 4.3% of the population were classified as Indigenous and rest as non-indigneous. By broad age group, 38.5% of the population were aged 0–14, one of the highest proportions in the department, 54.3% were aged 15–64, and 7.2% were aged 65 years and over. The median age was 19.9 years and the mean age was 26.5 years. Among the population aged 15 and over, the municipality recorded an illiteracy rate of 20.7%, lower than the departmental average of 22.2%. The municipality had 1,027 occupied private dwellings, with an average of 4.4 persons per occupied dwelling.

== Culture ==
Chinda celebrates its annual patron saint festival on 15 August in honor of the Virgin of the Transit. The traditional Guancasco festival is a Lenca cultural and religious celebration symbolizing peace and faith amongst western Honduran communities. It is celebrated annually in January and consists of several rituals and traditions.
