= Naranjito, Honduras =

Naranjito
- Municipality
- Location in Honduras
- Coordinates: 14°57′N 88°41′W
- Country: Honduras
- Department: Santa Bárbara
- Villages: 13

Area
  - Total: 130.5 km^{2} (50.4 sq mi)

Population (2019)
  - Total: 13,016
  - Density: 99.74/km^{2} (258.3/sq mi)

Naranjito is a municipality in the department of Santa Bárbara, Honduras. It covers an area of 130.5 km^{2} (50.4 sq mi) and had a population of 11,901 inhabitants according to the 2013 national census. The economy is dependent primarily on agriculture especially coffee, and livestock rearing.

== History ==
Naranjito was officially founded in 1820, and was elevated as a municipality in 1844. On 28 December 1931, the Naranjito district was created consisting of the municipalities of Protection, Atima and El Naranjito.

== Geography ==
Naranjito is located in the department of Santa Bárbara in Honduras. It borders the municipalities of Protección to the south, Atima and San Luis to the north, San Nicolás, Trinidad, and San Jose to the west, and Lepaera to the east. The municipality covers an area of 130.5 km^{2} (50.4 sq mi) and has an average elevation of 930 m (3,050 ft) above sea level. It is watered by the Jicatuyo River. There are several hot springs located near the municipality.

== Administrative divisions ==
The municipality comprises 12 aldeas (villages) and their associated caseríos (hamlets).

Population of Naranjito by area and aldea (2013)
Aldea	Population	Men	Women
Naranjito (municipal seat)	4,529	2,158	2,371
Camacal	847	439	408
El Nisperal	480	244	236
El Portillo	1,265	641	624
Jimilile	329	177	152
Las Crucitas	1,327	671	656
Quebrada del Rancho	525	277	248
San Isidro	595	314	281
San Juan	676	357	319
Santa Ana	348	178	170
Santiago de Posta	617	310	307
Ulapa	363	183	180
Total	11,901	5,948	5,953

== Demographics ==
At the time of the 2013 census, Naranjito had a total population of 11,901 inhabitants, of whom 5,948 (50.0%) were male and 5,953 (50.0%) were female. The population increased from 10,367 inhabitants in 2001 to 11,901 in 2013. The municipality had an urban population of 4,214 (35.4%) and a rural population of 7,687 (64.6%). By broad age group, 35.8% of the population were aged 0–14, 57.9% were aged 15–64, and 6.3% were aged 65 and over. The median age was 20.9 years and the mean age was 26.2 years. Of the population, 0.25% were classified as Indigenous and rest as non-indigenous. Among the population aged 15 and over, the illiteracy rate was 30.6%, which was higher than the departmental average of 22.2%.

== Culture and economy ==
The economy of Naranjito is primarily based on agriculture, especially the cultivation of coffee, maize, and beans. Livestock rearing and small-scale commerce also contribute to the local economy. Naranjito celebrates its annual festival on 15 August in honour of its patron Virgin of the transit.
