= San Luis, Santa Bárbara =

San Luis
- Municipality
- Location in Honduras
- Coordinates: 15°05′N 88°23′W
- Country: Honduras
- Department: Santa Bárbara
- Villages: 32

Area
  - Total: 381.3 km^{2} (147.2 sq mi)

Population (2013)
  - Total: 24,606
  - Density: 64.53/km^{2} (167.1/sq mi)
- Time zone: UTC-6 (Central America)

San Luis is a municipality in the department of Santa Bárbara, Honduras. It covers an area of 381.3 km^{2} (147.2 sq mi) and had a population of 24,606 inhabitants according to the 2013 national census. The economy is dependent primarily dependent on agriculture especially coffee, and livestock rearing.

== History ==
In the 1887 census, San Luis was listed as part of San Jose de Colinas, and later it was listed under the District of Hills.

== Geography ==
San Luis is located in the department of Santa Bárbara in Honduras. It borders the municipalities of San Marcos and Macuelizo to the north, Atima and Nuevo Celilac to the south, San José de Colinas and Trinidad to the east, and Macuelizo, Protección and Naranjito to the west. The municipality covers an area of 381.3 km^{2} (147.2 sq mi) and has an average elevation of 1,036 m (3,399 ft) above sea level.

== Administrative divisions ==
The municipality comprises 17 aldeas (villages) and their associated caseríos (hamlets).

Aldeas (villages) of San Luis
Aldea	Population	Men	Women
San Luis (municipal seat)	6,929	3,442	3,487
Calpules	964	515	449
El Sauce	733	366	367
El Regadío	629	337	292
Las Flores	1,102	581	521
Las Rosas	614	352	262
La Unión o El Playón	1,197	613	584
Nisperales	522	278	244
Palma Real	910	476	434
San Francisco	1,868	968	900
San Isidro	4,040	2,186	1,854
San Juan	1,592	884	708
San Miguel Cuabanales	692	343	349
Santa Elena	283	154	129
Tejutales	1,037	588	449
Tatoca o El Barro	887	474	413
Villa Luz	607	327	280
Total	24,606	12,885	11,721

== Demographics ==
At the time of the 2013 census, San Luis had a total population of 24,606 inhabitants, of which 12,885 (52.4%) were male and 11,721 (47.6%) were female. Of the total population, 5,857 (23.8%) were classified as urban and 18,749 (76.2%) lived in the rural areas. Of the population, 0.34% were classified as Indigenous and rest as non-indigenous.

By broad age group, 37.4% of the population were aged 0–14, 56.8% were aged 15–64, and 5.7% were aged 65 and over. The median age was 20.1 years and the mean age was 25.6 years. Among the population aged 15 and over (15,394 persons), the illiteracy rate was recorded as 29.2%, higher than the departmental average of 22.2%. The municipality had 5,732 occupied private dwellings, with an average household size of 4.2 persons.

== Economy ==
The economy is dependent primarily dependent on agriculture especially coffee, and livestock rearing. Other agricultural produce from the region include beans, maize, and fruits such as bananas.
