= San José de Colinas =

- Location in Honduras
- Coordinates: 14°48′N 88°54′W
- Country: Honduras
- Department: Santa Bárbara

Area
  - Total: 241.5 km^{2} (93.2 sq mi)

Population (2013)
  - Total: 18,791
  - Density: 77.81/km^{2} (201.5/sq mi)

San José de Colinas is a municipality in the department of Santa Bárbara, Honduras. It covers an area of 241.5 km^{2} (93.2 sq mi) and had a population of 18,791 inhabitants according to the 2013 census.

== History ==
San José de Colinas was earlier known as "San Antonio". The municipality was established under the name "Nueva Florida de San José" on 28 January 1812.

== Geography ==
San José de Colinas is located in the department of Santa Bárbara in Honduras. It borders the municipalities of San Luis and Trinidad to the north, Nuevo Celilac, Gualala, and Santa Bárbara to the south, Trinidad and Ilama to the east, and San Luis to the west. The municipality also along the Jicatuyo and Ulúa Rivers. The municipality covers an area of 241.5 km^{2} (93.2 sq mi).

Located at an elevation of approximately 784.3 m (2,573 ft) above sea level, San José de Colinas has a tropical monsoon climate (Köppen climate classification: Am). The municipality has an average annual temperature of 21.46 °C (70.63 °F) and receives about 294.1 mm (11.58 in) of annual precipitation.

== Administrative divisions ==
The municipality comprises 32 aldeas (villages) and their associated caseríos (hamlets).

Aldeas of San José de Colinas
Aldea	Total Population	Men	Women
San José de Colinas	5,427	2,632	2,795
Agua Helada	562	308	254
Cacahulapa	555	281	274
El Ceibón	443	244	200
El Encanto	345	191	153
El Jicaral	270	150	120
El Pacayalito	549	297	252
El Pastorero	316	159	157
El Pinabete	486	263	223
El Porvenir	378	215	163
El Triunfo	916	505	410
Hundiciones	407	217	190
La Alianza	518	286	231
La Comunidad	176	103	73
La Isla	289	153	136
La Libertad	485	258	227
La Nueva Florida	160	82	78
La Unión	337	174	163
Laguna Colorada	323	170	153
Laguna Inea	746	386	360
Las Joyas	44	24	20
Loma Larga	805	424	381
Nueva Esperanza	303	158	145
Peña Blanca	299	175	124
Piedra Grande	364	205	159
San Francisco del Carrizal	417	223	194
San José de Colón	214	116	98
San Luis del Pacayal	254	141	113
San Luis Planes	426	225	201
San Miguel de Lajas	1,071	590	481
Santa Cruz Cuchilla	295	151	144
Victoria	612	330	282
Total	18,791	9,836	8,955

== Demographics ==
According to the 2013 census, San José de Colinas had a total population of 18,791 inhabitants, of whom 9,836 (52.3%) were men and 8,955 (47.7%) were women. The municipality had an urban population of 5,215 (27.7%) and a rural population of 13,576 (72.3%). The intercensal growth rate between 2001 and 2013 was 1.7%.

About 1% of the population were classified as Indigenous and the rest as non-indigenous. By broad age group, 32.4% of the population were aged 0–14 years, 59.8% were aged 15–64, and 7.9% were aged 65 years and over. The median age was 24.9 years and the mean age was 29.2 years. Among the population aged 15 and over, the municipality recorded an illiteracy rate of 25.9%, higher than the departmental average of 22.2%. The municipality had 4,855 occupied private dwellings, with an average of 3.8 persons per occupied dwelling.

== Economy ==
The major economic activity is agriculture, and major crops include coffee, sugarcane, and other fruits and vegetables. Livestock farming is also practiced, which includes cattle, horses, and poultry. Other economic activity includes handicrafts, especially hats made of junco, a type of reed plant.
