= Concepción del Norte =

- Location in Honduras
- Coordinates: 15°10′06″N 88°07′06″W
- Country: Honduras
- Department: Santa Bárbara

Area
  - Total: 135.0 km^{2} (52.1 sq mi)

Population (2013)
  - Total: 8,989
  - Density: 66.59/km^{2} (172.5/sq mi)

Concepción del Norte is a municipality in the department of Santa Bárbara, Honduras. It covers an area of 135 km^{2} (52 sq mi) and had a population of 8,989 inhabitants according to the 2013 census.

== Geography ==
Concepción del Norte is located in the department of Santa Bárbara in Honduras. It borders the municipalities of Petoa and Trinidad to the north, Chinda to the south and west, and the department of Villanueva and San Antonio de Cortés to the east. The municipality covers an area of 135 km^{2} (52 sq mi).

Located at an elevation of approximately 290.7 m (954 ft) above sea level, Concepción del Norte has a tropical monsoon climate (Köppen climate classification: Am). The municipality has an average annual temperature of 22.98 °C (73.36 °F) and receives about 315.01 mm (12.402 in) of annual precipitation.

== Administrative divisions ==
The municipality comprises 13 aldeas (villages) and their associated caseríos (hamlets).

Aldeas of Concepción del Norte
Aldea	Total Population	Men	Women
Concepción del Norte	1,155	592	563
Agua Dulce	311	172	139
Buena Vista	167	88	79
Concordia	1,115	578	537
Cuchilla Alta	163	84	79
El Cerrón	609	327	282
El Macuelizo	354	179	175
El Robledal	1,090	595	495
El Volcán	1,229	635	594
La Laguna de Protección	418	237	181
Las Flores	1,012	528	484
Santa Ana	953	506	447
Suyapa	414	219	195
Total	8,989	4,741	4,248

== Demographics ==
According to the 2013 census, Concepción del Norte had a total population of 8,989 inhabitants, of whom 4,741 (52.7%) were men and 4,248 (47.3%) were women. The entire population was classified as rural.

About 0.5% of the population were classified as Indigenous and the rest as non-indigenous. By broad age group, 37.7% of the population were aged 0–14 years, 55.3% were aged 15–64, and 7.1% were aged 65 years and over. The median age was 20 years and the mean age was 26.3 years. Among the population aged 15 and over, the municipality recorded an illiteracy rate of 25.7%, higher than the departmental average of 22.2%. The municipality had 1,946 occupied private dwellings, with an average of 4.6 persons per occupied dwelling.
