= Rugby union in Honduras =

Rugby in Honduras

Rugby union in Honduras is a growing sport.

== History ==
=== Clubs ===
The first two teams started physical training in 2012. the first recorded 15 a side games were played in La Esperanza on 3 August 2013 Between Pirates RC (Roatan) and Lenca La Esperanza) resulting in a victory for Pirates 8–3 and Pirates RC vs Combined (Tegucigalpa and Lenca) resulting in a 63–5 victory for Pirates.

Rugby Tegucigalpa Honduras

The rugby club in Tegucigalpa was formed in January 2012 and trains at Villa Olimpica in Tegucigalpa. They played their first match against another team in the Granada Sevens tournament in Nicaragua in March 2013. They were the first Honduran club to play a competitive match outside Honduras.

Lenca Rugby Honduras

Lenca Rugby was formed as a La Esperanza-based offshoot of the Rugby Honduras program which was started in 2010 and whose Facebook page and website later became that of the national rugby federation. The name Lenca Rugby was coined in 2012 and represents the indigenous Lenca people who populate that area of Honduras. They originally practiced in Barrio El Tejar and were the first club in Honduras to have rugby posts on their pitch suitable for kicking conversions and penalties. In 2013 Lenca Rugby began receiving help from a company called CISA who provided logistics, coaching, equipment and players. They played in the first recorded Honduran 15 a side game in a home game against Roatan Pirates in August 2013.

Pirates Rugby Club, Roatan, Honduras

Pirates Rugby Club are based on the Honduran Island of Roatan. They are coached by Matthew Harper (South Africa). They train 3 times a week at the RECO (roatan electric company) field and play on the Kix field in Coxenhole. Pirates rugby club competed in the regional sevens tournament (Gruas Industriales Torneo) in Guatemala City on 7 September reaching the quarter-finals and beating Santa Rosa Rugby Club (Guatemala) 26 - 0 and in the semifinals (Copa Bronce) losing narrowly in the last minute to the Nicaraguan team by 12–10.

Maddogz Rugby Club, El Mochito, Santa Barbara, Honduras Maddogz was formed in 2013 by Canadian Jerry Boucher and the majority of players are miners in the El Mochito mine.

other teams In 2014 2 other teams initiated training on a regular basis in San Pedro Sula and West End in Roatan.

2014 highlights In February 2014 a 15 a side tournament was held at the Escuela Internacional Sampedrana with the participation of teams from Tegucigalpa (Tapires ), La Esperanza (Lenca ), El Mochito (Maddogz) and Pirates Rugby Club who won the tournament unbeaten with Tegucigalpa in second place. CONSUR referees Ricardo Leon and Carlos Paz from Guatemala presided.

In May in Roatan, teams from La Esperanza, El Mochito, 2 teams from Pirates (A and B) and the fledgling side from West End held a 7 a side tournament which was won by the Pirates.

In September at the facilities of the EIS in San Pedro all teams were represented at an assembly to elect the first official Federation for the period of 2014/2015.

== Rugby Clubs ==
- La Esperanza RFC (Lenca Rugby)
- Rugby Tegucigalpa Honduras
- Pirates Rugby Club, Roatan, Honduras
- Rugby Marcala Honduras
