= Las Vegas, Honduras =

Las Vegas
- Municipality
- Location within Honduras
- Coordinates: 14°49′N 88°03′W
- Country: Honduras
- Department: Santa Bárbara
- Municipal decree: 8 September 1987

Area
  - Municipality: 106.1 km^{2} (41.0 sq mi)
- Elevation: 895 m (2,936 ft)

Population (2013)
  - Municipality: 23,980
  - Density: 226.02/km^{2} (585.4/sq mi)
  - Urban: 11,708
  - Rural: 12,273

Las Vegas is a municipality in the department of Santa Bárbara, Honduras. It covers an area of 106.1 km^{2} (41.0 sq mi) and had a population of 23,980 inhabitants as per the 2013 national census. It is situated near the shores of Lake Yojoa. It is one of the principal commercial centres of the Santa Bárbara department.

== History ==
The municipality of Las Vegas was created by Executive Decree No. 38-87 MGJ, signed on 8 September 1987 by president José Azcona del Hoyo. The decree was issued in response to a petition filed by the Patronato Pro-Mejoramiento Comunal de Las Vegas (Pro-Communal Improvement Board of Las Vegas) on 8 September 1986. The municipality was carved out of the territory previously belonging to the municipality of San Pedro Zacapa, in the same department of Santa Bárbara.

== Geography ==
Las Vegas is located in the department of Santa Bárbara, Honduras. It is bound by the municipalities of San Pedro Zacapa in the south, Concepción del Sur in the northwest, Santa Cruz in the east, and the shores of Lake Yojoa in the west. It covers an area of 106.1 km^{2} (41.0 sq mi) and has a mean elevation of 895 m (2,936 ft) above sea level. The municipality is situated in a small valley surrounded by mountainous terrain. It has a temperate climate with maximum temperatures of 28–33 °C (82–91 °F) in the summer, and 6–27 °C (43–81 °F) in the winter.

== Administrative divisions ==
The municipality comprises seven aldeas (villages) and their associated caseríos (hamlets).

Aldeas (villages) of Las Vegas
Aldea	Population (2013)	Men	Women
Las Vegas	9,663	4,667	4,997
El Carreto	1,492	793	698
El Mochito o Mocho Arriba	5,319	2,645	2,674
El Sauce	2,510	1,314	1,195
Flores de Bijao	820	409	411
La Unión Suyapa	532	264	268
San José de Los Andes	3,645	1,912	1,733
Total	23,980	12,005	11,975

== Demographics ==
At the time of the formation, the population of the municipality was recorded as 8,826 inhabitants. As per the 2013 census, Las Vegas had a total population of 23,980 inhabitants, of whom 12,005 (50.1%) were male and 11,976 (49.9%) were female. The municipality is the most densely populated in the department, with a density of 226.02 inhabitants per km². Of the total population, 11,708 (48.8%) lived in urban and 12,273 (51.2%) in the rural areas. By broad age group, 37.0% of the population were aged 0–14, 57.7% were aged 15–64, and 5.3% were aged 65 and over. The median age was 20.6 years and the mean age was 25.4 years. Among the population aged 15 and over (15,112 persons), the illiteracy rate of 15.9%, which is lower than the departmental average of 22.2%.

The 2013 census recorded 6,447 private dwellings in the municipality, of which 5,349 were occupied. Of the occupied dwellings, 4,305 (80.5%) were owner-occupied and 523 (9.8%) were rented. Of the occupied private dwellings, 4,368 (81.7%) had access to water from the public distribution system, and 4,679 dwellings (87.5%) had access to electricity, of which 4,373 were connected to the public electricity system.

== Economy ==
Las Vegas is one of the principal commercial centres of Santa Bárbara department. The main economic activities of the municipality are agriculture, livestock rearing raising, and commerce. A major source of employment is the El Mochito mine, located close to the aldea of El Mochito o Mocho Arriba.
