= Arada, Honduras =

Municipality in Hondurus

Arada
- Municipality
- Location in Honduras
- Coordinates: 14°051′N 88°018′W
- Country: Honduras
- Department: Santa Bárbara
- Villages: 14
- Established: 22 June 1900

Area
  - Total: 108 km^{2} (42 sq mi)

Population (2013)
  - Total: 9,622
  - Density: 89.1/km^{2} (231/sq mi)

Arada (Spanish pronunciation: [aˈɾaða]) is a municipality in the department of Santa Bárbara, Honduras. It covers an area of 108 km^{2} (42 sq mi) and had a population of 9,622 inhabitants according to the 2013 national census. It was officially established on 22 June 1900.

== History ==
Arada was earlier part of the municipality of Santa Bárbara. The people petitioned for it to be declared as an independent municipality due to the difficulty in accessing the Santa Bárbara as the Ulua River ran in between the settlements. It was officially established as a municipality on 22 June 1900, and the first municipal council took office on 4 January 1901 with Agapito Rodríguez as the first mayor.

"Arada" is derived from Spanish meaning "plough". The earlier inhabitants were from the nearby El Ocotal village. As the soil at El Ocotal was unsuitable for agriculture, they searched for fertile lands nearby, and found Arada. The farmers traveled daily to work, and returned back to their native village at sunset, and this activity led to the name of the place itself.

== Geography ==
Arada is located in the southern part of the department of Santa Bárbara in Honduras. It borders the municipalities of San Nicolás and San Vicente Centenario to the north, Santa Bárbara to the east, El Níspero to the south, and La Unión, and San Nicolás to the west. The municipality covers an area of 108 km^{2} (42 sq mi) and has an average elevation of 432 m (1,417 ft) above sea level.

== Administrative divisions ==
The municipality comprises 11 aldeas (villages) and their associated caseríos (hamlets).

Aldeas (villages) of Arada
| Aldea | Population | Men | Women |
|---|---|---|---|
| Arada (municipal seat) | 3,211 | 1,619 | 1,592 |
| Buena Vista | 249 | 130 | 119 |
| Candelaria | 727 | 392 | 335 |
| Caulotales | 746 | 410 | 336 |
| El Ocotal | 1,143 | 575 | 569 |
| El Ocotillo | 571 | 271 | 300 |
| El Palmo | 1,098 | 556 | 542 |
| El Tular | 121 | 58 | 63 |
| Las Brisas de Oro | 1,180 | 636 | 545 |
| Los Planes | 90 | 41 | 49 |
| Sorca | 485 | 259 | 226 |
| Total | 9,622 | 4,948 | 4,674 |

== Demographics ==
As per the 2013 census, Arada had a total population of 9,622 inhabitants, of which 4,948 (51.4%) were male and 4,674 (48.6%) were female, with a masculinity index of 105.8 men per 100 women. Of the total population, 2,771 (28.8%) lived in the urban and 6,851 (71.2%) in the rural areas. The population density was 89.09 inhabitants per km². The intercensal population growth rate between 2001 and 2013 was 1.4% per year.

Of the population, 0.3% were Indigenous and rest were non-indigenous people. By broad age group, 36.3% of the population were aged 0–14, 57.9% were aged 15–64, and 5.8% were aged 65 and over. The median age was 21.3 years and the mean age was 26.3 years. Among the population aged 15 and over (6,134 persons), the 2013 census recorded an illiteracy rate of 26.4%, higher than the departmental average of 22.2%. The municipality had 2,312 occupied private dwellings, with an average household size of 4.1 persons.
