= Ceguaca =

- Municipality
- Location in Honduras
- Coordinates: 14°48′N 88°12′W
- Country: Honduras
- Department: Santa Bárbara
- Villages: 5
- Established: 19 January 1895

Area
  - Total: 61.2 km^{2} (23.6 sq mi)

Population (2013)
  - Total: 4,948
  - Density: 80.8/km^{2} (209/sq mi)
- Climate: Aw

Ceguaca is a municipality in the department of Santa Bárbara, Honduras. It covers an area of 61.2 km^{2} (23.6 sq mi) and had a population of 4,948 inhabitants according to the 2013 national census. It was officially established on 19 January 1895.

== History ==
"Ceguaca" means "place of corn cob holders" in Spanish. The municipality was officially established on 19 January 1895.

== Geography ==
Ceguaca is located in the department of Santa Bárbara in Honduras. It borders the municipalities of Santa Bárbara to the north, San Francisco de Ojuera to the south, Concepción del Sur to the east, and Santa Rita to the west. The municipality covers an area of 61.2 km^{2} (23.6 sq mi) and has a mean altitude of 504 m (1,654 ft).

== Administrative divisions ==
The municipality comprises five aldeas (villages) and their associated caseríos (hamlets).

Aldeas (villages) of Ceguaca
Aldea	Population	Men	Women
Ceguaca	1,899	976	923
El Edén	745	394	351
La Libertad	785	419	366
San Juan	684	367	317
Santa Ana o Las Lomas	835	428	407
Total	4,948	2,583	2,365

== Demographics ==
At per the 2013 census, Ceguaca had a population of 4,948 inhabitants, of whom 2,583 (52.2%) were male and 2,365 (47.8%) were female, with a masculinity index of 109.2 men per 100 women. The entire population was classified as rural, with no urban population recorded in the census. The population density was 80.85 inhabitants per square kilometre, and the intercensal population growth rate between the 2001 and 2013 census was 1.6%.

About 5.5% of the population were classified as Indigenous and rest as non-indigneous. By broad age group, 34.3% of the population were aged 0–14, 58.5% were aged 15–64, and 7.2% were aged 65 years and over. The median age was 22.1 years and the mean age was 27.3 years. Among the population aged 15 and over, the 2013 census recorded an illiteracy rate of 25.8%, higher than the departmental average of 22.2%. The municipality had 1,156 occupied private dwellings, with an average of 4.2 persons per occupied dwelling.
