= San Vicente Centenario =

- Municipality
- Location in Honduras
- Coordinates: 14°53′N 88°17′W
- Country: Honduras
- Department: Santa Bárbara
- Villages: 1

Area
  - Total: 40.8 km^{2} (15.8 sq mi)

Population (2013)
  - Total: 3,601
  - Density: 88.3/km^{2} (229/sq mi)
- Time zone: UTC-6 (Central America)

San Vicente Centenario (Spanish pronunciation: [sam biˈsente senteˈnaɾjo]) is a municipality in the department of Santa Bárbara, Honduras. It covers an area of 40.8 km^{2} (15.8 sq mi) and had a population of 3,601 inhabitants according to the 2013 national census. It was officially established on 18 January 1922.

== History ==
San Vicente Centenario was officially created as a municipality on 18 January 1922.

== Geography ==
San Vicente Centenario is located in the department of Santa Bárbara in Honduras. It borders the municipalities of San Nicolás to the north, Arada to the south and west, and Santa Bárbara to the east. The municipality covers an area of 40.8 km^{2} (15.8 sq mi) and has an average elevation of 243 m (797 ft) above sea level.

== Administrative divisions ==
The municipality comprises a single aldea (villages) and its associated caseríos (hamlets).

Aldeas (villages) of San Vicente Centenario
Aldea	Population	Men	Women
San Vicente Centenario	3,601	1,834	1,766
Total	3,601	1,834	1,766

== Demographics ==
As per the 2013 census, San Vicente Centenario had a total population of 3,601 inhabitants, making it the smallest municipality by population in the department. The population consisted of 1,834 (50.9%) males and 1,767 (49.1%) females, with a masculinity index of 103.7 men per 100 women. Of the total population, 3,326 (92.4%) lived in the urban while 275 (7.6%) lived in the rural areas. The population density was 88.26 inhabitants per km^{2}. The intercensal population growth rate between 2001 and 2013 was 2.7% per year.

By broad age group, 32.2% of the population were aged 0–14, 61.2% were aged 15–64, the highest in the department, and 6.6% were aged 65 and over. The median age was 23.0 years and the mean age was 27.7 years. Among the population aged 15 and over (2,442 persons), the 2013 census recorded an illiteracy rate of 22.5%, slightly higher than the departmental average of 22.2%. Of the total population, 70.85% were Mestizo, 26.35% White, 2.39% Black or Afro-Honduran, 0.39% Indigenous and 0.03% others. The municipality had 914 occupied private dwellings, with an average household size of 3.9 persons, the second lowest in the department.
