= Graciela Bográn =

Honduran teacher, writer and women's rights activist

- Born: Graciela Bográn Rodríguez; 19 October 1896; San Nicolás, Santa Bárbara, Honduras
- Died: 2000 (aged -1–0); San Pedro Sula, Honduras
- Occupations: teacher, writer, women's rights activist

Graciela Bográn (19 October 1896 – 2000) was a Honduran teacher, writer and women's rights activist, she was the daughter of Chelsea Bogran. Engaged in the fight for women's suffrage, she was involved in both the trade union movement and political protests. She was also well-known as the editor of the feminist journal Alma Latina. After women won the right to vote, she was appointed to serve on the cabinet in the Department of Public Education. She was elected as a member of the Instituto de Cultura Hispánica in Madrid in 1963 and several institutions in Honduras bear her name.

== Early life ==
Graciela Bográn Rodríguez was born on 19 October 1896 in San Nicolás, Santa Bárbara, Honduras to Petrona Rodríguez and Marco Antonio Bográn. The eldest of three siblings, she had a sister, Petrona "Elvira" (born 1904) and a brother, Napoleón (born 1907). Her family descended from Romain Beuagrand (Román Bográn), a French colonel from Brittany, who arrived in Honduras in the early 19th century, and through him was related to both presidents Luis Bográn and Francisco Bográn.

After completing her primary education, Bográn graduated from the Escuela Normal de Señoritas (Ladies Normal School) in 1914 and began working as a teacher. In 1916, she married the poet, Rubén Bermúdez Meza and subsequently had three children: Graciela, Rubén and Roberto. When they divorced, she married again with a North American businessman, Alvin M. Barret (also Barrett).

== Career ==
In 1932, Bográn founded the magazine, Alma Latina, which became an influential feminist-political and cultural journal throughout Central America. At the time, she was opposed to women's suffrage because of the violence associated with voting throughout Central America. Most Honduran women in the 1920s and 1930s, were not supporters of women's enfranchisement as it did not have a historic basis in the Honduran culture, where social and economic subordination were seen more as a class struggle, or simply accepted. This changed in the 1940s, when Bográn and other feminists saw the advantages to voting as a means to bring more democratic governance to the country.

In 1944, Bográn was accused of being a communist by the Honduran government. Because she was working as a labor organizer in the northern part of the country, she was suspected of teaching communist doctrine as an agent for Vicente Lombardo Toledano, a Mexican Marxist labor leader. The United States Ambassador to Honduras, John Draper Erwin, concluded after an investigation, that there was no communist activity in the country and did not classify Bográn, stating "any person who agitates for improved labor conditions is often classified as a communist". That same year, she and Rodolfo Pastor Zelaya, a founder of the Revolutionary Democratic Party of Honduras led a pro-democracy demonstration in San Pedro Sula in protest to the arrests of citizens calling for the ouster of President Tiburcio Carías Andino.

The right to vote in Honduras was secured for literate women in 1955 and women were able to vote the following year for the first time. Upon the election of President Ramón Villeda Morales, in 1957, Bográn was appointed to his cabinet, as undersecretary of Education. In 1959, she was appointed to serve as the federal Secretary of Public Education. Bográn had continued her work as an educator throughout her life and in 1963, for her service as director of the Instituto Hondureño de Cultura Hispánica (Honduran Institute of Hispanic Culture), she was elected to the Instituto de Cultura Hispánica in Madrid.

== Death and legacy ==
Bográn died in 2000 in San Pedro Sula, Honduras. She is remembered as one of the leading women's rights activists and suffragists of her era. Since 1998, the House of Culture in San Nicolás, has borne her name, as do several educational facilities. There is a government preschool, Centro de Educación Pre Básica Graciela Bográn in the La Trinidad neighborhood of San Pedro Sula, and in Tegucigalpa, there is the Colegio Graciela Bogran in the Jardines de Toncontin neighborhood.

== Selected works ==
- Bográn, Graciela (November 1933). "¿Debe o no concederse el sufragio a la mujer hondureña?" [Should the Vote Be Granted or Not to Honduran Woman?]. Alma Latina (in Spanish). 2 (31): 5.
- Ministerio de Cultura, ed. (1956). En Torno a Masferrer (in Spanish). San Salvador, El Salvador: El Salvador Departamento Editorial. hdl:10972/2640. OCLC 3550523. Collection of essays by Graciela Bográn, Quino Caso, Pedro Geoffroy Rivas, et al.
- Bográn, Graciela (1990). Disertaciones. San Pedro Sula, Honduras: Centro Editorial.
- Bográn, Graciela (1996). Escritos, 1932–1984. Vol. 1. San Pedro Sula, Honduras: Centro Editorial. OCLC 42019423.
- Bográn, Graciela (1996). Escritos, 1932–1984. Vol. 2. Honduras: Herederos de Graciela Bográn. OCLC 948105875.

== Further research ==
- Antúnez Castillo, Rubén (1966). Retazo de la historia cultural de San Pedro Sula: diccionario periodístico, diccionario de autores, cronología de la imprenta. San Pedor Sula, Honduras: Imprenta Antúnez. OCLC 3587033.
- Gutiérrez Pacheco, Azucena (1998). Rosas, lotos y ángeles rebeldes (in Spanish). San Pedro Sula, Honduras: Centro Universitario Regional del Norte.
