= San Pedro Zacapa =

- Municipality
- Location in Honduras
- Coordinates: 14°45′N 88°07′W
- Country: Honduras
- Department: Santa Bárbara
- Villages: 10

Area
  - Total: 227.8 km^{2} (88.0 sq mi)

Population (2013)
  - Total: 10,535
  - Density: 46.25/km^{2} (119.8/sq mi)
- Time zone: UTC-6 (Central America)
- Climate: Am

San Pedro Zacapa (Spanish pronunciation: [sam ˈpeðɾo saˈkapa]) is a municipality in the department of Santa Bárbara, Honduras. It covers an area of 227.8 km^{2} (88.0 sq mi) and had a population of 10,535 inhabitants according to the 2013 national census. The first indigenous settlers arrived from Guatemala in 1780, and it later became a municipality in the Santa Bárbara District.

== History ==
The name originated from the Mesoamerican word "Cacat Atl" , meaning "between rivers", indicating its location between the Zacapa, Zunzucuapa and Guajiniquil rivers. It was named so by the first indigenous settlers who arrived from Guatemala in 1780. During the 1801 census, it was listed as part of Tencoa, and it was listed as a municipality in the Santa Bárbara District as per the Political Territorial Division of Honduras in 1889.

== Geography ==
San Pedro Zacapa is located in the department of Santa Bárbara in Honduras. It borders the municipalities of Intibucá and Jesús de Otoro to the south, San José de Comayagua and Santa Cruz de Yojoa to the east, Santa Bárbara and Santa Cruz de Yojoa to the north, and Concepción del Sur and San Francisco de Ojuera to the west. The municipality covers an area of 227.8 km^{2} (88.0 sq mi) and has an average elevation of 385 m (1,263 ft) above sea level. Several rivers including the Ulua, Jaiti, Zacapa River, Cacao, Limón, and Jimilares pass through the municipality. Cerro Cargamón is an inactive volcano in the department. The Cacao in La Boquita, Salto in Agua Zarca, and Salto de Cangel in Mojarras are major waterfalls in the municipality. The Calichon caves are located in the El Zapote village.

== Administrative divisions ==
The municipality comprises 10 aldeas (villages) and their associated caseríos (hamlets).

Aldeas of San Pedro Zacapa (2013)
Aldea	Population	Men	Women
San Pedro Zacapa	2,078	1,034	1,044
Agua Caliente	1,031	501	530
Azacualpa	1,974	940	1,034
Canculuncos	672	311	361
El Mogote	489	243	246
El Ocote	747	381	366
Horconcitos	1,681	858	823
La Boquita	689	348	341
Mojarras	427	186	241
San Antonio de Chuchepeque	746	354	392
Total	10,535	5,156	5,378

== Demographics ==
As per the 2013 census, San Marcos had a total population of 10,535 inhabitants, of whom 5,378 were male and 5,378 were female. Of the total population, 14.3% was classified as urban and 85.7% lived in the rural areas.

Of the total population, 11% was classified as Indigenous and rest as non-indigenous. By broad age group, 36.7% of the population were aged 0–14, 56.8% were aged 15–64, and 6.5% were aged 65 and over. The median age was 20.6 years and the mean age was 26.4 years. Among the population aged 15 and over, the illiteracy rate was 17.4%, lower than the departmental average of 22.2%.
