= Gualala, Honduras =

Gualala
- Location in Honduras
- Coordinates: 15°01′N 88°14′W
- Country: Honduras
- Department: Santa Bárbara
- Villages: 8

Area
  - Total: 66.33 km^{2} (25.61 sq mi)

Population (2013)
  - Total: 5,191
  - Density: 78.26/km^{2} (202.7/sq mi)

Gualala is a municipality in the department of Santa Bárbara, Honduras. It covers an area of 66.33 km^{2} (25.61 sq mi) and had a population of 5,191 inhabitants according to the 2013 national census.

== History ==
The municipality of Gualala was earlier known as "Gualatan" and "Gualalatepequez", a name derived from the indigenous language meaning "Abundance of Good Lands".

== Geography ==
Gualala is located in the department of Santa Bárbara in Honduras. It borders the municipalities of Ilama to the north, Santa Barbara to the south, San José de Colinas to the east, and Ilama to the west. The municipality covers an area of 66.33 km^{2} (25.61 sq mi).

Located at an elevation of 784.3 m (2,573 ft) above sea level, Gualala has a tropical monsoon climate (Köppen classification: Am). The municipality has an average annual temperature of 21.07 °C (69.93 °F) and receives approximately 288.85 mm (11.372 in) of rainfall annually.

== Administrative divisions ==
The municipality comprises eight aldeas (villages) and their associated caseríos (hamlets).

Aldeas of Gualala
Aldea	Total Population	Men	Women
Gualala	701	341	360
Arenales	730	393	337
El Carrizal	423	221	202
Guacamaya	2,022	1,087	935
Gualjoquito	402	205	197
Platanares	103	52	51
Quebrada Arriba	105	56	49
Santa Rosita	705	382	323
Total	5,191	2,737	2,454

== Demographics ==
According to the 2013 census, Gualala had a total population of 5,191 inhabitants, if whom 2,737 (52.7%) were men and 2,454 (47.3%) were women. The entire population was classified as rural, with no urban population recorded in the census. The intercensal growth rate between 2001 and 2013 was 1.7%.

About 2.3% of the population were classified as Indigenous and rest as non-indigneous. By broad age group, 32% of the population were aged 0–14 years, 57.7% were aged 15–64, and 9.3% were aged 65 years and over. The median age was 24.8 years and the mean age was 29.6 years. Among the population aged 15 and over, the municipality recorded an illiteracy rate of 25.7%, higher than the departmental average of 22.2%. The municipality had 1,266 occupied private dwellings, with an average of 4.1 persons per occupied dwelling.

== Sports ==
The football club, Atlético Gualala, which competes in the Honduran second division, the Liga de Ascenso de Honduras, is based out of the city.
