= San Marcos, Santa Bárbara =

San Marcos
- Municipality
- Location in Honduras
- Coordinates: 15°18′N 88°25′W
- Country: Honduras
- Department: Santa Bárbara
- Villages: 20

Area
  - Total: 222.8 km^{2} (86.0 sq mi)

Population (2013)
  - Total: 15,229
  - Density: 68.35/km^{2} (177.0/sq mi)
- Time zone: UTC-6 (Central America)
- Climate: Aw

San Marcos is a municipality in the department of Santa Bárbara, Honduras. It covers an area of 222.8 km^{2} (86.0 sq mi) and had a population of 15,229 inhabitants according to the 2013 national census. The VII Festival of Traditional Games was held in San Marcos on 31 April 2006.

== History ==
In the 1791 census, San Marcos was listed as part of Petoa, and in the 1896, it was already listed as a municipality under the Quimistán district.

== Geography ==
San Marcos is located in the department of Santa Bárbara in Honduras. It borders the municipalities of Quimistán to the north, Petoa to the east, San Luis and Trinidad to the south, and Macuelizo to the west. It is located about 56 km (35 mi) from the city of San Pedro Sula. The municipality covers an area of 222.2 km^{2} (85.8 sq mi) and has an average elevation of 267 m (876 ft) above sea level.

== Administrative divisions ==
The municipality comprises 20 aldeas (villages) and their associated caseríos (hamlets).

Aldeas (villages) of San Marcos
Aldea	Population	Men	Women
San Marcos (municipal seat)	5,800	2,821	2,980
Agua Tapada	359	183	176
Bella Vista	693	358	335
Campo Alegre	242	126	116
Corralito	436	238	198
Chumbagua	157	90	67
El Chorro	121	65	56
Llano de Los Panales	277	153	124
El Robledal	636	337	299
La Presa	306	167	140
La Puerta	437	223	214
Las Minitas	518	270	247
Piletas	167	92	75
Plan de Olola	226	116	110
Potrerillos	1,419	731	688
Regadío	205	108	97
San Francisco de Los Valles	1,923	977	945
Sitio Viejo	733	414	319
Zapote No.1	310	161	149
Zapote No.2	264	133	131
Total	15,229	7,762	7,467

== Demographics ==
As per the 2013 census, San Marcos had a total population of 15,229 inhabitants, of whom 7,762 (51.0%) were male and 7,467 (49.0%) were female. Of the total population, 5,660 (37.2%) was classified as urban and 9,568 (62.8%) lived in the rural area. The intercensal population growth rate between 2001 and 2013 was 1.2% per year.

Of the population, 0.3% were Indigenous and the rest were non-indigenous population. By broad age group, 36.2% of the population were aged 0–14, 57.7% were aged 15–64, and 6.1% were aged 65 and over. The median age was 21.2 years and the mean age was 26.2 years. Among the population aged 15 and over (9,714 persons), the illiteracy rate was 21.1%, slightly lower than the departmental average of 22.2%. The municipality had 3,558 occupied private dwellings, with an average household size of 4.2 persons.

== Culture ==
The VII Festival of Traditional Games was held in San Marcos on 31 April 2006. Athlete Gaby Flores and journalist Neida Sandoval were honored during the Games.
