= Azacualpa, Honduras =

Azacualpa Azacualpence
- Municipality
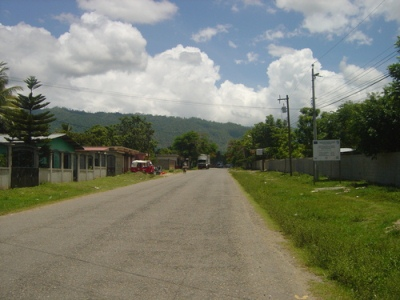

- Location within Honduras
- Coordinates: 14°43′0″N 88°6′0″W
- Country: Honduras
- Department: Santa Bárbara
- Villages: 10

Area
  - Total: 222.3 km^{2} (85.8 sq mi)

Population (2013)
  - Total: 20,210
  - Density: 90.91/km^{2} (235.5/sq mi)
- Area code: 011504
- Climate: Aw

Azacualpa (Spanish pronunciation: [asaˈkwalpa]) is a municipality in the department of Santa Bárbara, Honduras. It covers an area of 222.3 km^{2} (85.8 sq mi) and had a population of 20,210 inhabitants according to the 2013 national census. It was officially established on 16 May 1960.

== History ==
Azacualpa was earlier part of the municipality of Macuelizo. On 15 August 1958, a request for declaration of it as a municipality was submitted. It was officially declared so by Resolution No. 33 on 16 May 1960 during the reign of president Ramón Villeda Morales. The first council took office on 22 May 1960.

== Etymology ==
There are several theories as to the meaning of the name "Azacualpa". It might mean "in the pyramid" as per Mexican usage. In Etimología de Honduras, it is stated that it is probably derived from Nahuatl language meaning "abandoned or uninhabited village".

== Geography ==
Azacualpa is located in the northern part of the department of Santa Bárbara in Honduras. It borders the municipalities of Macuelizo to the south, Nuevo Celilac and Quimistan to the east, and La Unión, and Nueva Frontera to the west. It also shares a land border with Guatemala. The municipality covers an area of 222.3 km^{2} (85.8 sq mi) and an average altitude of 246 m (807 ft).

== Administrative divisions ==
The municipality comprises ten aldeas (villages) and their associated caseríos (hamlets).

Aldeas (villages) of Azacualpa
Aldea	Population	Men	Women
Azacualpa	8,083	4,197	3,886
Agualote	3,196	1,662	1,534
Buenos Aires	355	166	189
El Naranjo	444	199	245
El Pinabete	555	256	299
Joconal	2,339	1,146	1,193
Laguna Verde	3,020	1,494	1,526
La Puerta	159	69	90
Loma Alta	1,985	958	1,027
San Antonio	75	29	46
Total	20,210	10,176	10,036

== Demographics ==
At per the 2013 census, Azacualpa had a total population of 20,210 inhabitants, of whom 10,036 (49.7%) were male and 10,174 (50.3%) were female. Of the total population, 12,561 (62.2%) lived in the urban area and 7,649 (37.8%) in the rural areas.

About 0.59% of the population were classified as Indigenous and rest as non-indigneous. By broad age group, 35.6% of the population were aged 0–14, 58.5% were aged 15–64, and 5.9% were aged 65 and over. The median age was 20.9 years and the mean age was 25.9 years. Among the population aged 15 and over, the 2013 census recorded an illiteracy rate of 19.7%, lower than the departmental average of 22.2%.
