= Macuelizo =

- Municipality
- Location within Honduras
- Coordinates: 15°18′N 88°32′W
- Country: Honduras
- Department: Santa Bárbara
- Founded: 29 July 1894

Area
  - Total: 413.1 km^{2} (159.5 sq mi)
- Elevation: 708 m (2,323 ft)

Population (2013)
  - Total: 34,401
  - Density: 83.28/km^{2} (215.7/sq mi)

Macuelizo is a municipality in the department of Santa Bárbara, Honduras. It covers an area of 413.1 km^{2} (159.5 sq mi) and had a population of 34,401 inhabitants according to the 2013 national census. The municipality is situated in the fertile Quimistán Valley and is watered by the Culupa and Chamelecón Rivers. The Pan American Highway crosses the municipality. It has significant natural resources and mineral deposits, including gold and antimony.

== History ==
Records indicate that the first land titles in the present day municipality of Macuelizo were granted in 1779. The first reference to the municipality itself is from 1792, when proceedings were initiated for the establishment of a new settlement in the Valley of Macuelizo under the jurisdiction of San Pedro Sula. It was formally founded on 28 July 1794 under the name "Maculosus" and it originally belonged to the jurisdiction of Quimistán. The municipality was officially created on 29 July 1894 under the name "Valle de Maculoso", which simply became Maculoso later. The name is derived from the maceulizo (Tabebuia rosea) trees found in the region. In the late eighteenth century, the layout of the central square and streets were created, and the first municipal authorities were appointed.

== Geography ==
Macuelizo is located in the southern part of the department of Santa Bárbara in western Honduras. It borders the municipalities of Azacualpa and Nueva Frontera to the north, San Luis and Protección to the south, Quimistán and San Marcos to the east, and Florida to the west. It also shares a land border with Guatemala. The municipality is spread over an area of 413.1 km^{2} (159.5 sq mi) and an average elevation of 708 m (2,323 ft) above sea level. The municipality lies in the fertile Quimistán Valley and is traversed by the Culupa and Chamelecón River. It has significant natural resources and mineral deposits, including gold and antimony. The Pan American Highway crosses the municipality.

== Administrative divisions ==
The municipality comprises 29 aldeas (villages) and their associated caseríos (hamlets).

Aldeas (villages) of Macuelizo
Aldea	Population	Men	Women
Macuelizo (municipal seat)	3,742	1,758	1,983
Agua Helada	228	114	114
Aldea Nueva	267	141	125
Buena Vista	521	268	253
Callejones o La Libertad	2,847	1,363	1,484
Casa Quemada	1,715	891	825
Chiquila	1,565	798	767
El Ciruelo	4,449	2,193	2,256
El Manguito	353	167	186
El Pital	1,201	632	569
El Rosario	1,550	793	756
La Cumbre de Palmichal	1,044	522	521
Cunta	438	219	219
La Flecha	3,871	1,855	2,016
La Vegona	366	195	171
La Virtud	295	142	153
Laguna Seca	77	41	36
Las Delicias	358	182	176
Las Flores	254	133	120
Las Varas	459	216	243
Mata de Plátano	902	506	397
Ojos de Agua	347	193	155
Piñuelas	338	168	171
Río Blanco	1,549	794	755
Sabanetas	590	274	316
San Antonio de la Cumbre	833	420	414
San Antonio de Macuelizo	232	105	127
Sula	3,394	1,591	1,803
Zapotalito	616	308	308
Total	34,401	16,983	17,418

== Demographics ==
According to the 2013 census, Macuelizo had a population of 34,401 inhabitants of whom 16,983 (49.4%) were male and 17,418 (50.6%) were female. The population has grown steadily since the twentieth century, increasing from 26,919 inhabitants in 2001 to 34,401 in 2013. Of the total population, 13,643 (39.7%) lived in the urban and 20,758 (60.3%) in the rural area. By broad age group, 35.7% of the population were aged 0–14, 58.3% were aged 15–64, and 6.0% were aged 65 and over. The median age was 20.8 years and the mean age was 25.8 years. Of the population, 0.86% were classified as Indigenous and rest as non-indigenous. Among the population aged 15 and over (22,115 persons), the illiteracy rate was 20.6% against the department average of 22.2%.

The 2013 census recorded 9,646 private dwellings in the municipality, of which 7,636 were occupied. The average household size in occupied private dwellings was 4.4 persons. Of the 9,646 private dwellings, 9,056 (93.9%) were classified as independent houses (casas independientes). Of the occupied private dwellings, 6,437 (84.3%) were owner-occupied, 671 (8.8%) were rented, and 411 (5.4%) were borrowed or ceded without payment. Of the 7,636 occupied private dwellings, 4,150 (54.4%) obtained water from the public system. About 4,124 dwellings (54.0%) had access to piped water within the dwelling and 2,719 (35.6%) had piped water outside the dwelling but within the property. Of 7,636 occupied private dwellings, 7,153 (93.7%) had access to electric lighting, of which 6,479 were connected to the public electricity system. For cooking energy, 5,834 dwellings (76.4%) used firewood (leña) as their primary fuel, 1,123 (14.7%) used propane gas, and 414 (5.4%) used electricity.

== Economy ==
The economy of Macuelizo is primarily based on agriculture, livestock rearing, commerce, and mining activities. Agricultural produce from the region include beans, rice, maize, coffee, sugarcane, and tobacco. The fertile lands of the Quimistán Valley support extensive cultivation and cattle rearing. Mining also plays a significant role in the local economy. Gold deposits are mined in the aldea of Chiquilá, while iron ore is found in Sierra and antimony in La Concordia. Sand mined from the Culupa River and used for construction in the surrounding region. There is a hydroelectric dam on the Chamelecon River.

== Culture ==
The municipality celebrates its annual festival in September in honour of its patron Saint Michael. Festivities include religious ceremonies, parades, horseback riding events, and traditional fairs.
