= Nueva Frontera =

- Municipality
- Location in Honduras
- Coordinates: 15°18′N 88°40′W
- Country: Honduras
- Department: Santa Bárbara
- Nueva Frontera: 1 August 1998

Area
  - Land: 155.46 km^{2} (60.02 sq mi)

Population (2013)
  - Total: 13,069
  - Density: 84.067/km^{2} (217.73/sq mi)
- Time zone: UTC-6 (Central America)

Nueva Frontera is a municipality in the department of Santa Bárbara, Honduras. It was officially established on 1 August 1998. It covers an area of 155.46 km^{2} (60.02 sq mi) and had a population of 13,069 inhabitants according to the 2013 national census.

== History ==
Nueva Frontera was created by Decree No. 192-97 of the National Congress of Honduras, which was published in the official gazette on 17 December 1997. The decree established the municipality under the given name, which was earlier known as "Trascerros" based on a suggestion by Solomón Fajardo. The municipality was officially established on 1 August 1998.

== Geography ==
Nueva Frontera is a municipality in the department of Santa Bárbara in Honduras. It borders the municipalities of Azacualpa to the north, Macuelizo to the south and east, and Florida to the west. It also shares land border with Guatemala to the west. The municipality is spread over an area of 155.46 km^{2} (60.02 sq mi), about 87 km (54 mi) from San Pedro Sula and 326 km (203 mi) from Tegucigalpa.

== Administrative divisions ==
Nueva Frontera comprises eight aldeas (villages) and their associated caseríos (hamlets).

Population of Nueva Frontera by aldea (2013)
Aldea	Population	Men	Women
Trascerros	4,725	1,974	2,302
San José de Tarros	3,431	1,443	1,739
El Ermitaño	2,031	830	1,088
Piladeros	996	387	480
El Oro	622	246	304
El Barranco	514	229	269
Pueblo Nuevo	459	184	246
San Miguelito	290	125	150
Total	13,069	5,418	6,578

== Demographics ==
According to the 2013 census, Nueva Frontera had a population of 13,069 inhabitants, of whom 5,418 were male and 6,578 were female. It had an urban population of 4,565 inhabitants and a rural population was 8,503 inhabitants. By broad age group, 41.5% of the population were aged 0–14, 53.3% were aged 15–64, and 5.3% were aged 65 and over. The median age was 18.4 years and the mean age was 24.1 years. Of the population, 0.28% were classified as Indigenous and rest as non-indigenous. Among the population aged 15 and over, the illiteracy rate was 28.4%, which was higher than the departmental average of 22.2%.
