= Breakwater Resources =

- Company type: Public
- Traded as: TSX: BWR
- Industry: Mining
- Founded: 1979
- Defunct: 2011
- Fate: Acquired by Nyrstar
- Headquarters: Toronto, Ontario, Canada
- Number of locations: Four operating mines
- Products: Zinc; Lead; Silver; Gold

Breakwater Resources was a mining company based in Toronto, Ontario, Canada. On August 26, 2011 the company was acquired by Nyrstar.

== Mines ==
=== Operations ===
Breakwater operated six mines:

- Myra Falls mine in British Columbia
- Langlois mine in Quebec
- El Mochito mine in Honduras
- El Toqui mine in Chile
- Nanisivik Mine closed in 2002
- Bouchard-Hebert mine closed in 2005
