= San Nicolás, Santa Bárbara =

San Nicolás
- Municipality
- Location in Honduras
- Coordinates: 14°56′N 88°19′W
- Country: Honduras
- Department: Santa Bárbara
- Villages: 9
- Established: 20 January 1850

Area
  - Total: 88.2 km^{2} (34.1 sq mi)

Population (2013)
  - Total: 14,368
  - Density: 163/km^{2} (422/sq mi)
- Time zone: UTC-6 (Central America)
- Climate: Aw

San Nicolás is a municipality in the department of Santa Bárbara, Honduras. It covers an area of 88.2 km^{2} (34.1 sq mi) and had a population of 14,368 inhabitants according to the 2013 national census. The municipality was officially established on 20 February 1840. It briefly served as the provisional capital of the department in 1864.

== History ==
Historical records of San Nicolás date back to 1693, when Sebastián Henríquez and José Mejía, chiefs of San Marcos de Jalapa in the Tencoa district, purchased 64.58 manzanas of land from the Spanish. The settlement was named as "La Estancia de San Nicolás del Llano de Erazo" (Ranch of San Nicolás del Llano de Erazo), and was used for agriculture and livestock rearing. The settlement flourished due to its fertile lands, and was granted a village status in the late 18th century. In 1838, it applied for a municipality status, and separation from the erstwhile municipality of Celilac. On 20 February 1840, it was officially accorded the status by president Francisco Zelaya Ayes, with Trinidad Castellón Huete, serving as the first mayor.

In 1864, during the reign of president José María Medina, San Nicolás was made as the provisional capital of the department. During the First Honduran Civil War in 1919, the municipality saw fighting between the government troops commanded by Colonel Teófilo Castillo and rebel forces led by Generals Ernesto Alvarado and José María Reina, which resulted in the victory for the rebel forces.

== Geography ==
San Nicolas is located in the department of Santa Bárbara in Honduras. It borders the municipalities of Nuevo Celilac to the north, Santa Bárbara to the east, San Vicente Centenario, Arada and La Unión to the south, and Atima to the west. It is located on the banks of the Ulua River. The municipality covers an area of 88.2 km^{2} (34.1 sq mi) and has an average elevation of 479 m (1,572 ft) above sea level.

== Administrative divisions ==
The municipality comprises 10 aldeas (villages) and their associated caseríos (hamlets).

Aldeas (villages) of San Nicolás
Aldea	Population	Men	Women
San Nicolás (municipal seat)	4,947	2,387	2,561
Cruz Grande	1,725	906	819
Choloma o Hacienda Las Minitas	1,115	563	552
El Descansadero	153	75	78
El Pinalejo	198	105	93
El Porvenir	3,991	2,059	1,932
El Resumidero	430	233	197
La Cuchilla	573	305	268
San Manuel del Triunfo	618	323	295
Santa Cruz	618	334	284
Total	14,368	7,290	7,078

== Demographics ==
As per the 2013 census, San Nicolás had a total population of 14,368 inhabitants, of whom 7,290 (50.7%) were male and 7,078 (49.3%) were female. Of the total population, 5,627 (39.2%) were classified as urban and 8,741 (60.8%) lived in the rural areas. The intercensal population growth rate between 2001 and 2013 was 2.2% annually.

Of the total population, 0.57% were classified as Indigenous, and rest as non-indigenous. The municipality has a significant migrant population from Nicaragua and Guatemala. By broad age group, 36.1% of the population were aged 0–14, 57.8% were aged 15–64, and 6.1% were aged 65 and over. The median age was 21.6 years and the mean age was 26.2 years. Among the population aged 15 and over (9,181 persons), the 2013 census recorded an illiteracy rate of 22.0%, almost similar to the departmental rate of 22.2%. The municipality had 3,413 occupied private dwellings, with an average household size of 4.1 persons.
