= Concepción del Sur =

- Municipality
- Location in Honduras
- Coordinates: 14°48′0″N 88°9′0″W
- Country: Honduras
- Department: Santa Bárbara
- Villages: 5

Area
  - Total: 64.74 km^{2} (25.00 sq mi)

Population (2013)
  - Total: 5,486
  - Density: 84.74/km^{2} (219.5/sq mi)

Concepción del Sur is a municipality in the department of Santa Bárbara, Honduras. It covers an area of 64.74 km^{2} (25.00 sq mi) and had a population of 5,486 inhabitants according to the 2013 census.

== History ==
In the population census of 1887, Concepción del Sur appeared as a village in Santa Bárbara. The municipality was created on 27 October 1900, when it was carved out of the municipality of Ceguaca.

== Geography ==
Concepción del Sur is located in the department of Santa Bárbara in Honduras. It borders the municipalities of Santa Bárbara to the north, San Francisco de Ojuera to the south, San Pedro Zacapa to the east, and Ceguaca to the west. The municipality covers an area of 64.74 km^{2} (25.00 sq mi).

Located at an elevation of approximately 784.3 m (2,573 ft) above sea level, Concepción del Sur has a tropical monsoon climate (Köppen climate classification: Am). The municipality's yearly temperature is 21.23 °C (70.21 °F) and typically receives about 290.93 mm (11.454 in) of annual precipitation.

== Administrative divisions ==
The municipality comprises five aldeas (villages) and their associated caseríos (hamlets).

Aldeas of Concepción del Sur
Aldea	Total Population	Men	Women
Concepción del Sur	2,099	1,087	1,012
El Aguaje	763	390	373
El Playón	709	372	337
La Vueltosa	949	454	495
Nueva Esperanza	965	516	449
Total	5,486	2,819	2,667

== Demographics ==
According to the 2013 census, Concepción del Sur had a total population of 5,486 inhabitants, of whom 2,819 (51.4%) were men and 2,667 (48.6%) were women. The entire population was classified as rural.

By broad age group, 2,051 individuals (37.4%) were aged 0–14 years, 3,179 individuals (58.0%) were aged 15–64 (consisting of 2,684 individuals aged 15–49 and 495 individuals aged 50–64), and 255 individuals (4.6%) were aged 65 years and over. The median age was 20.8 years and the mean age was 25.1 years. Among the population aged 15 and over, the municipality recorded an illiteracy rate of 25.7%, higher than the departmental average of 22.2%. The municipality had 1,946 occupied private dwellings, with an average of 4.6 persons per occupied dwelling.
