= Santa Rita, Santa Bárbara =

- Municipality
- Location in Honduras
- Coordinates: 14°46′N 88°16′W
- Country: Honduras
- Department: Santa Bárbara
- Villages: 5

Area
  - Total: 83.6 km^{2} (32.3 sq mi)

Population (2013)
  - Total: 3,975
  - Density: 47.5/km^{2} (123/sq mi)
- Time zone: UTC-6 (Central America)

Santa Rita is a municipality in the department of Santa Bárbara, Honduras. It covers an area of 83.6 km^{2} (32.3 sq mi) and had a population of 3,975 inhabitants according to the 2013 national census. It was accorded municipality status on 22 October 1900.

== History ==
Santa Rita was a village in the municipality of San Francisco de Ojuera until it was elevated to a municipality status on 22 October 1900.

== Geography ==
Santa Rita is located in the department of Santa Bárbara in Honduras. It borders the municipalities of Santa Bárbara to the north, San Francisco de Ojuera to the east and south, El Níspero and San Rafael to the west. The municipality covers an area of 83.6 km^{2} (32.3 sq mi) and has an average elevation of 364 m (1,194 ft) above sea level.

== Administrative divisions ==
The municipality comprises five aldeas (villages) and their associated caseríos (hamlets).

Aldeas (villages) of San Marcos
Aldea	Population (2013)	Men	Women
Santa Rita	2,619	1,262	1,357
El Aguaje	418	190	228
El Jengibral	62	31	31
El Teuxinte	362	175	187
San Fernando	514	235	279
Total	3,975	1,893	2,082

== Demographics ==
As per the 2013 census, San Marcos had a total population of 3,975 inhabitants, of whom 2,082 were male and 1,983 (49.0%) were female. Of the total population, 44.7% was classified as urban and 55.3% lived in the rural areas.

Of the population, 0.18% were classified as Indigenous and rest as non-indigenous. By broad age group, 39.6% of the population were aged 0–14, 64.5% were aged 15–64, and 6.5% were aged 65 and over. The median age was 19.6 years and the mean age was 25.5 years. Among the population aged 15 and over, the illiteracy rate was 21.9%, slightly lower than the departmental average of 22.2%.
