= San Francisco de Ojuera =

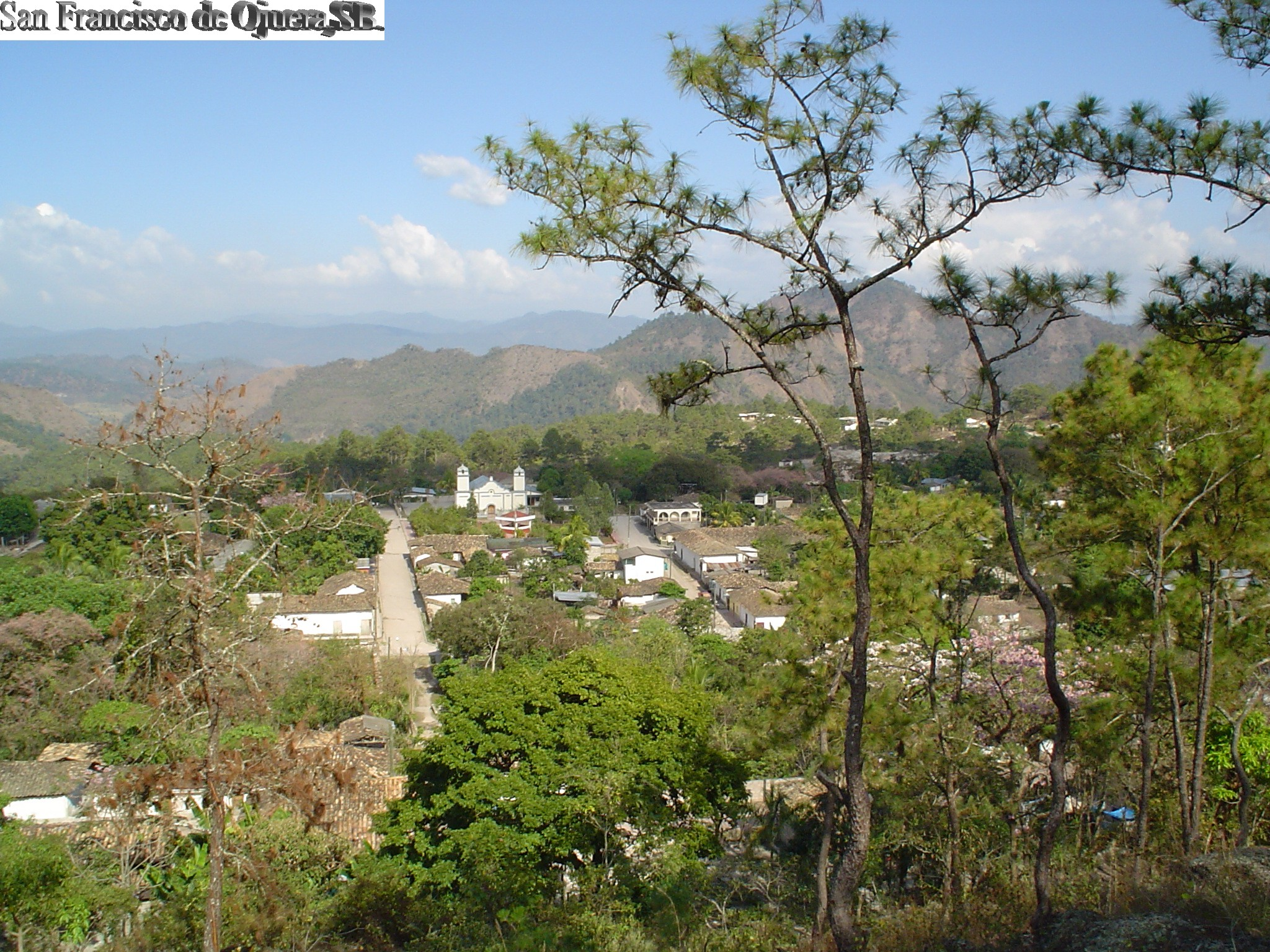

- Location in Honduras
- Coordinates: 14°45′N 88°11′W
- Country: Honduras
- Department: Santa Bárbara

Area
  - Total: 179.0 km^{2} (69.1 sq mi)

Population (2013)
  - Total: 7,000
  - Density: 39/km^{2} (100/sq mi)

San Francisco de Ojuera is a municipality in the department of Santa Bárbara, Honduras. It covers an area of 179.0 km^{2} (69.1 sq mi) and had a population of 7,000 inhabitants according to the 2013 census.

== History ==
During the population census of 1791, San Francisco de Ojuera is mentioned as "Ojuera". The municipality was officially established in 1895, as a part of Santa Bárbara.

== Geography ==
San Francisco de Ojuera is located in the department of Santa Bárbara in Honduras. It borders the municipalities of Concepción del Sur to the north, the department of Intibucá to the south, San Pedro Zacapa to the east, and Ceguaca and Santa Rita to the west. The Winse and Gualcarque Rivers pass through the municipality. The municipality covers an area of 179 km^{2} (69 sq mi).

Located at an elevation of approximately 784.3 m (2,573 ft) above sea level, San Francisco de Ojuera has a tropical savanna climate (Köppen climate classification: Aw). The municipality has an average annual temperature of 21.04 °C (69.87 °F) and receives about 288.39 mm (11.354 in) of annual precipitation.

== Administrative divisions ==
The municipality comprises 13 aldeas (villages) and their associated caseríos (hamlets).

Aldeas of San José de Colinas
Aldea	Total Population	Men	Women
San Francisco de Ojuera	1,253	628	625
El Diviso	240	125	115
El Gavilán	212	117	95
El Pilón	189	96	93
La Chorrera	184	95	89
La Palca	654	333	321
La Vega	1,163	605	558
Plan de Los Cedros	319	158	161
Pueblo Nuevo	172	79	93
San Isidro	508	267	241
San Ramón	596	289	307
Santa Ana	631	351	280
Santa Fe	879	453	426
Total	7,000	3,595	3,202

== Demographics ==
According to the 2013 census, San Francisco de Ojuera had a total population of 7,000 inhabitants, of whom 3,595 (51.3%) were men and 3,404 (48.7%) were women. The entire population was classified as rural.

About 1.9% of the population were classified as Indigenous and the rest as non-indigenous. By broad age group, 39.5% of the population were aged 0–14 years, 54.5% were aged 15–64, and 6% were aged 65 years and over. The median age was 19.7 years and the mean age was 25.4 years. Among the population aged 15 and over, the municipality recorded an illiteracy rate of 19%, lower than the departmental average of 22.2%. The municipality had 1,602 occupied private dwellings, with an average of 4.3 persons per occupied dwelling.

The major economic activity is agriculture, and major crops include coffee, maize, beans, and vegetables.
