= El Níspero =

- Location in Honduras
- Coordinates: 14.767°N 88.333°W
- Country: Honduras
- Department: Santa Bárbara
- Villages: 7

Area
  - Total: 78.14 km^{2} (30.17 sq mi)

Population (2013)
  - Total: 8,109
  - Density: 103.8/km^{2} (268.8/sq mi)

El Níspero is a municipality in the department of Santa Bárbara, Honduras. It covers an area of 78.14 km^{2} (30.17 sq mi) and had a population of 8,109 inhabitants according to the 2013 census.

== History ==
In the 1887 census, El Níspero appears as a village under the jurisdiction of Arada within Santa Bárbara. It was formally constituted as a municipality on 9 May 1917.

== Geography ==
El Níspero is located in the department of Santa Bárbara in Honduras. It borders the municipalities of Arada to the north, San Rafael to the south, Santa Rita to the east, and La Unión to the west. The municipality covers an area of 78.14 km^{2} (30.17 sq mi). It is located on the banks of the Pajosa River.

Located at an elevation of approximately 615.69 m (2,020.0 ft) above sea level, El Níspero has a tropical monsoon climate (Köppen climate classification: Am). The municipality has an average annual temperature of about 22.33 °C (72.19 °F) and receives approximately 306.3 mm (12.06 in) of rainfall annually.

== Administrative divisions ==
The municipality comprises seven aldeas (villages) and their associated caseríos (hamlets).

Aldeas of El Níspero
Aldea	Total Population	Men	Women
El Níspero	2,921	889	1,495
El Paraíso	555	237	302
El Tontolo	532	226	279
Nejapa	460	155	231
Nueva York	807	307	438
San Jerónimo	1,425	545	715
Santa Cruz	1,408	486	729
Total	8,109	4,189	3,920

== Demographics ==
According to the 2013 census, El Níspero had a total population of 8,109 inhabitants, of whom 4,189 (51.7%) were men and 3,920 (48.3%) were women. The municipality had an urban population of 2,860 and a rural population of 5,249. The intercensal growth rate between 2001 and 2013 was 1.7%.

About 0.5% of the population were classified as Indigenous and the rest as non-indigenous. By broad age group, 35.1% of the population were aged 0–14 years, 57.9% were aged 15–64, and 7.0% were aged 65 years and over. The median age was 22.2 years and the mean age was 27.0 years. Among the population aged 15 and over, the municipality recorded an illiteracy rate of 24.7%, higher than the departmental average of 22.2%. The municipality had 1,964 occupied private dwellings, with an average of 4.1 persons per occupied dwelling.
