= Atima =

- Municipality
- Location in Honduras
- Coordinates: 14°56′N 88°29′W
- Country: Honduras
- Department: Santa Bárbara

Government
  - Mayor: Roger Gabriel Leiva Gonzales

Area
  - Total: 203.4 km^{2} (78.5 sq mi)
- Elevation: 978 m (3,209 ft)

Population (2013)
  - Total: 17,648
  - Density: 86.76/km^{2} (224.7/sq mi)
- Climate: Aw

Atima is a municipality in the department of Santa Bárbara, Honduras. It covers an area of 203.4 km^{2} (78.5 sq mi) and had a population of 17,648 inhabitants according to the 2013 national census. It was officially established on 18 September 1887.

== History ==
During the 1801 population census, Atima was part of the town of Tencoa. It was later known as the village of San José de Atima, and was part of Viejo Celilac. It was officially established as a municipality on 18 September 1887, and was part of the District of Hills in the Honduran Territorial Political Division of 1896. "Atima" is derived from Mexican usage, and means "place where water is drunk".

== Geography ==
Atima is located in the department of Santa Bárbara in Honduras. It borders the municipalities of San Luis to the north, La Unión to the south, Nuevo Celilac and San Nicolás to the east, and La Unión, and Naranjito and Lepaera to the west. The municipality covers an area of 203.4 km^{2} (78.5 sq mi). It is located on the banks of the San José River. The San Juan de Atima River runs to the west of the municipality, and the Caracoles Mountain also lies to the west.

== Administrative divisions ==
The municipality comprises 8 aldeas (villages) and their associated caseríos (hamlets).

Aldeas (villages) of Atima
Aldea	Population	Men	Women
Atima (municipal seat)	3,813	1,849	1,964
Berlín	3,219	1,648	1,571
Lempa	1,046	541	505
Nueva Victoria	2,021	1,036	984
San José de Buena Vista	1,125	581	544
San Pedrito	2,550	1,322	1,228
San Rafael	818	437	381
Talanga	3,056	1,557	1,499
Total	17,648	8,971	8,677

== Demographics ==
At per the 2013 census, Atima had a total population of 17,648 inhabitants, of whom 8,971 (50.8%) were male and 8,677 (49.2%) were female, with a masculinity index of 103.4 men per 100 women. Of the total population, 2,135 (12.1%) lived in the urban area and 15,513 (87.9%) in the rural areas. The intercensal population growth rate between 2001 and 2013 was 3.1% per year, the second highest in the department.

About 7.13% of the population were classified as Indigenous and rest as non-indigenous. By broad age group, 39.2% of the population were aged 0–14, the fifth highest proportion in the department, 56.5% were aged 15–64, and 4.3% were aged 65 and over, the lowest proportion in the department. The median age was 19.5 years and the mean age was 23.9 years. Among the population aged 15 and over (10,735 persons), the 2013 census recorded an illiteracy rate of 23.6%, slightly higher than the departmental average of 22.2%. The municipality had 3,761 occupied private dwellings, with an average household size of 4.6 persons, the third highest in the department.

In 2021, two workers were stabbed fatally in the village of Berlín.

== Economy ==
The municipality is the largest producer of coffee in the department with its terrain and climate favoring its cultivation.
