= Quimistán =

- Municipality
- Location in Honduras
- Coordinates: 15°21′N 88°24′W
- Country: Honduras
- Department: Santa Bárbara

Area
  - Total: 745.3 km^{2} (287.8 sq mi)

Population (2013)
  - Total: 47,993
  - Density: 64.39/km^{2} (166.8/sq mi)
- Time zone: UTC-6 (Central America)

Quimistán is a municipality in Santa Bárbara Department of Honduras. It covers an area of 745.3 km^{2} (287.8 sq mi) and had a population of 47,993 inhabitants according to the 2013 national census. It is the most populous municipality in Santa Bárbara department.

== History ==
The region was part of the region conquered by the conquistador Pedro de Alvarado in the early 16th century CE. In 1791, it is mentioned as part of the curato (ecclesiastical jurisdiction) of Petoa. Later, it was part of the San Pedro partido, which later became San Pedro Sula. The word Quimistan is from Nahuatl roots and means "Place of mice or spies".

== Geography ==
Quimistan is located in the department of Santa Bárbara in Honduras. It borders the municipalities of Petoa and San Marcos to the south, Azacualpa and Macuelizo to the west, San Pedro Sula to the west, and Omoa to the north. The municipality covers an area of 745.3 km^{2} (287.8 sq mi).

== Administrative divisions ==
The municipality comprises 41 aldeas (villages) and their associated caseríos (hamlets).

Aldeas (villages) of Quimistán
Aldea	Population	Men	Women
Quimistán (municipal seat)	6,765	3,222	3,542
Agua Sucia	866	427	439
Aldea Nueva o La Divisoria	423	221	202
Buenos Aires	670	348	322
Buena Vista	204	102	102
Camalote	1,966	991	975
Col. Brisas del Campo	222	112	110
Concepción del Listón	516	274	242
Correderos	2,204	1,140	1,064
El Aguacate	1,567	787	780
El Chaguite	292	165	127
El Higuerito	519	266	253
El Pinal	213	113	100
El Porvenir o El Descanso	204	107	96
El Tablón	826	422	404
El Venado	204	103	102
La Acequia	3,986	1,968	2,019
La Ceibita	1,535	776	759
La Mina	752	380	372
La Montañita	885	469	416
Laguna del Carmen	451	226	225
Las Crucitas	1,219	639	580
Las Flores de Río Chiquito	741	390	351
Milpa Arada	847	423	424
Naco	2,655	1,351	1,304
Nueva Esperanza	1,071	576	494
Nueva Esperanza de Río Chiquito	366	186	180
Ocotal Tupido	996	491	505
Pichinel	238	131	107
Pinalejo	7,568	3,594	3,974
Río Blanco	1,400	756	644
Río Chiquito	142	74	68
San Isidro	1,280	705	575
San José del Cacao	567	313	254
San Juan del Sitio	432	236	196
San Miguel del Paso Viejo	270	143	127
Santa Cruz Minas	1,922	999	922
Tierra Amarilla	164	85	79
Unión Frontera	116	65	51
Vista Hermosa	728	384	344
Total	47,993	24,158	23,835

== Demographics ==
At the time of the 2013 census, Quimistán had a total population of 47,993 inhabitants, of which 24,158 (50.3%) were male and 23,835 (49.7%) were female. It is the most populous municipality in Santa Bárbara department. Of the total population, 14,445 (30.1%) was classified as urban and 33,549 (69.9%) lived in rural.

Of the total population, 6.16% were classified as Indigenous and rest as non-indigenous. By broad age group, 37.6% of the population were aged 0–14, 57.6% were aged 15–64, and 4.8% were aged 65 and over. The median age was 20.3 years and the mean age was 24.8 years. Among the population aged 15 and over (29,951 persons), the illiteracy rate was recorded as 17.6% as against 22.2% for the department. The municipality had 10,778 occupied private dwellings, with an average household size of 4.3 persons.

== Culture ==
The municipality celebrates its annual festival in June in honour of its patron San Juan Bautista.
