= Nuevo Celilac =

- Municipality
- Location in Honduras
- Coordinates: 14°59′N 88°20′W
- Country: Honduras
- Department: Santa Bárbara
- Villages: 7
- Established: 29 December 1888

Area
  - Total: 168.2 km^{2} (64.9 sq mi)

Population (2013)
  - Total: 8,086
  - Density: 48.07/km^{2} (124.5/sq mi)

Nuevo Celilac (Spanish pronunciation: [ˈnweβo seliˈlak]) is a municipality in the Honduran department of Santa Bárbara. The municipality was officially created on 29 December 1888. It covers an area of 168.2 km^{2} (64.9 sq mi) and had a population of 8,086 inhabitants according to the 2013 national census.

== History ==
In 1791, the region was mentioned as "Celilaca", a settlement of the parish of Tencoa. It was later called as "San Pedro Celilac". According to local accounts, the settlement was affected by a cholera epidemic in 1860, after which the surviving inhabitants relocated to Tuliapa, which later became the present-day town of Nuevo Celilac. The municipality was officially created on 29 December 1888, and the first municipal authorities were appointed on 20 February 1889. It included the territories of San Pedro Celilac, San Marcos de Jalapa, and San Jerónimo del Pinal. The name derives either from a Mexican word meaning "in the water of the snails", or the Lenca term meaning "place of water of the reeds".

== Geography ==
Naranjito is located in the department of Santa Bárbara in Honduras. It borders the municipalities of San José de Colinas to the west and to the south, San Nicolás to the east, and Atima to the west. The municipality covers an area of 168.2 km^{2} (64.9 sq mi), and is located to the south of the Jicatuyo River.

== Administrative divisions ==
The municipality comprises seven aldeas (villages) and their associated caseríos (hamlets).

Aldeas of Nuevo Celilac (2013)
| Aldea | Population | Men | Women |
|---|---|---|---|
| Nuevo Celilac | 1,564 | 770 | 794 |
| La Aradita | 330 | 153 | 177 |
| Las Crucitas | 405 | 192 | 213 |
| Nuevo Jalapa o Tierra Blanca | 3,470 | 1,688 | 1,782 |
| San Jerónimo del Pinal | 612 | 315 | 297 |
| San Nicolasito | 543 | 262 | 281 |
| Valle de La Cruz | 1,163 | 570 | 593 |
| Total | 8,086 | 3,950 | 4,137 |

== Demographics ==
According to the 2013 census, Nuevo Celilac had a population of 8,086 inhabitants, of whom 3,950 were male and 4,137 were female. The urban population was 1,758 inhabitants, while the rural population was 6,328 inhabitants. By broad age group, 2,991 inhabitants were aged 0–14 years, 3,760 were aged 15–49 years, 769 were aged 50–64 years, and 566 were aged 65 years and over. Of the overall population, 3.35% was classified as Indigenous and rest as non-indigenous. Among the population aged 15 years and over, the illiteracy rate was 24.8%, which was higher than the departmental average of 22.2%.

== Culture ==
The annual patronal festival of Nuevo Celilac is celebrated on 29 and 30 June in honour of Saint Peter and Saint Paul. The National Folk Festival of the Tusa is held annually in September, and promotes local cultural and artistic traditions, parades, and competitions. The Jewish cultural group "Los Judíos", whose traditions date back to 1838, was reorganized in 1983 and participate in local festivities. The "Ocotillo" is a local tradition, during which people cut and transport a pine tree to the town square, where an effigy of Judas is hung during celebrations. The municipality is associated with the folk music group "Los Caramberos de Celilac", which has participated in the Cervantino Festival in Mexico.
