= Protección =

- Municipality
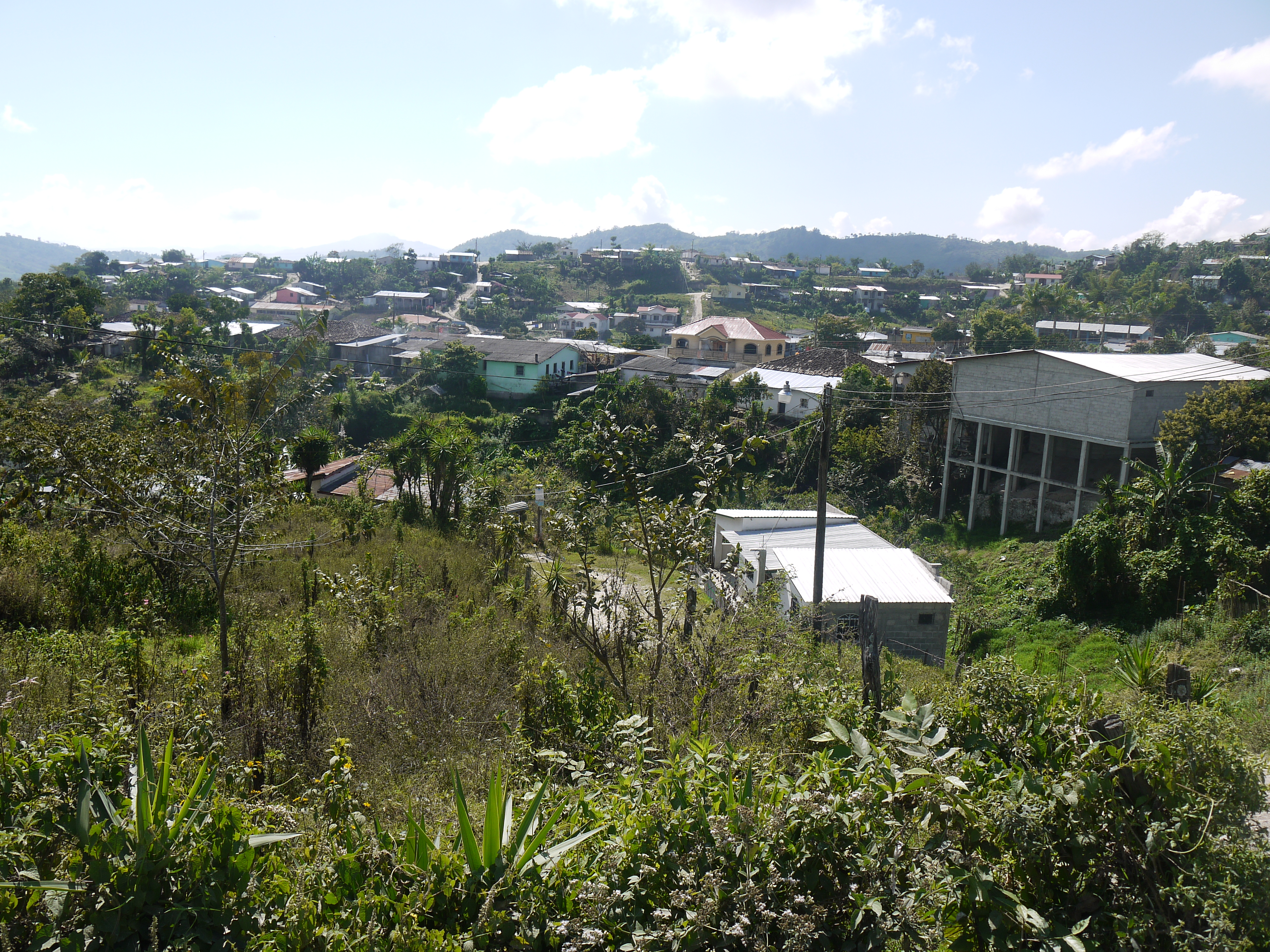
- Protección, Santa Barbara, Honduras, Entrance to Town

- Location within Honduras
- Coordinates: 15°02′N 88°39′W
- Country: Honduras
- Department: Santa Bárbara
- Municipality: Protección
- Founded, El Ocotal: 1880
- Renamed Protección: 1883
- Municipality: 15 May 1927; 99 years ago

Government
  - Type: Democratic Municipality
  - Mayor: José Antonio Guillen Rivera (PSH)

Area
  - Land: 261.6 km^{2} (101.0 sq mi)
- Elevation: 906 m (2,972 ft)

Population (2015)
  - Total: 16,799
  - Density: 64.22/km^{2} (166.3/sq mi)
- Time zone: UTC-6 (Central America)
- Climate: Aw

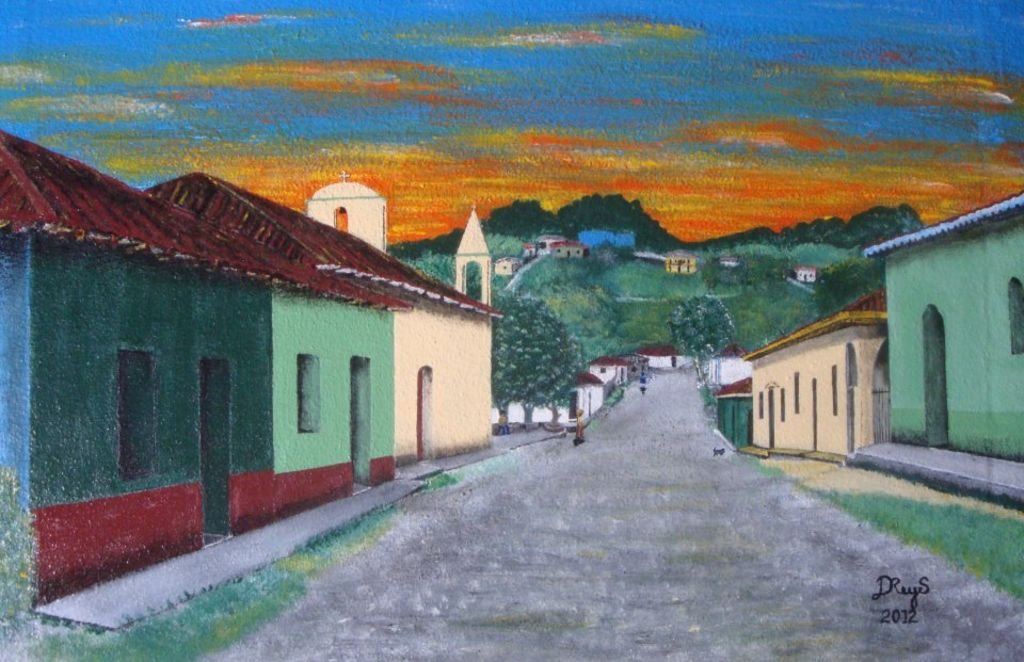
Municipality of Protección Santa Bárbara, Honduras. Painting by Darwin Reyes

Protección (Spanish pronunciation: [pɾoteɣˈsjon]) is a municipality in the Honduran department of Santa Bárbara.

== History ==
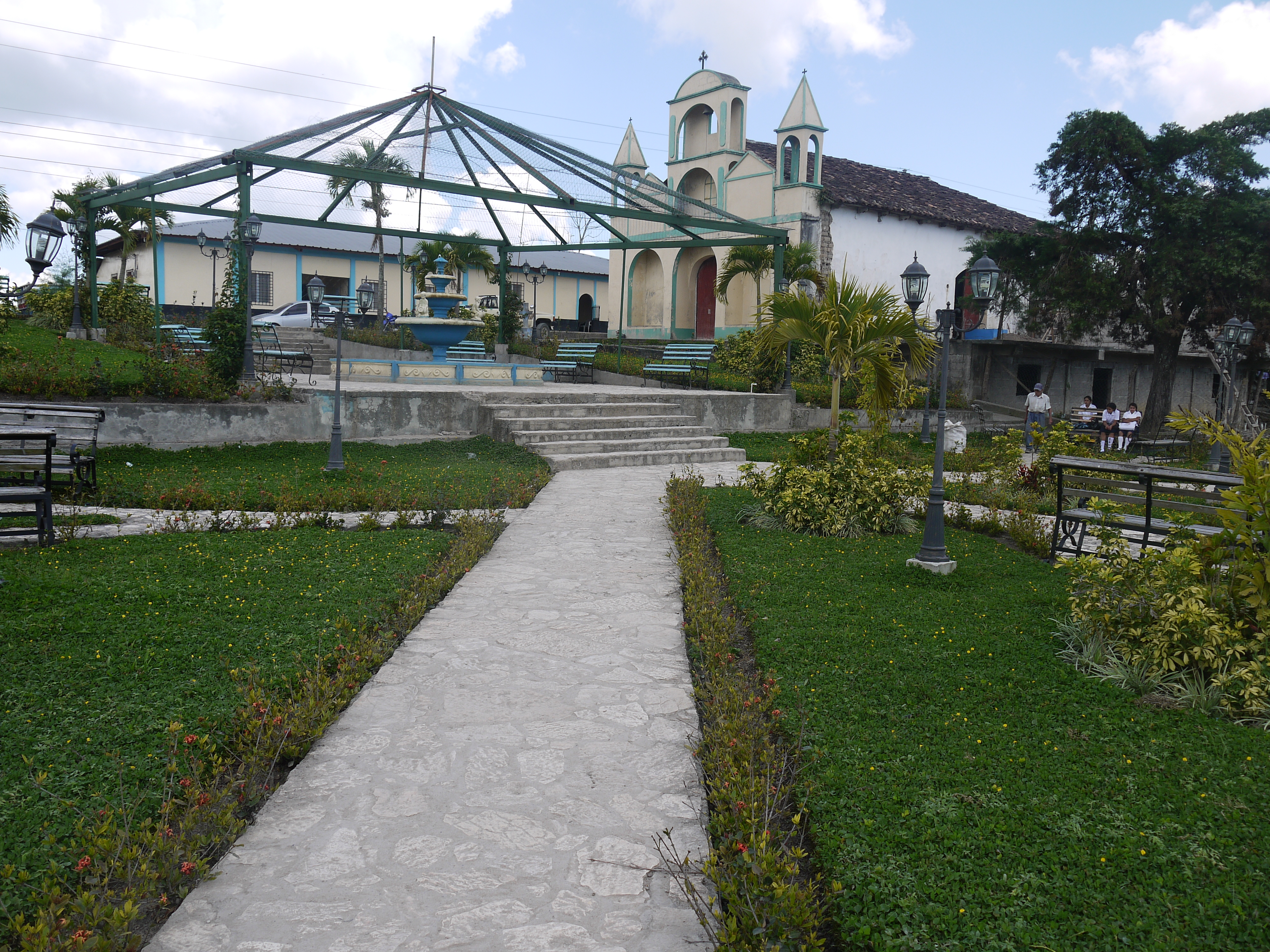
Central Park and Church in Protección.

Protección was founded in 1880, with the name of El Ocotal. The name was due to the abundance of pine trees that were in the area ("ocotal" is used colloquially in Honduras to refer a stand of pine trees). The first settlers came to graze livestock from the communities of Santiago and San Juan Posta, which belonged to the municipality of Naranjito, Santa Bárbara. The first houses, called "toros," were built of grass. Because the workers had to travel some distance to graze their livestock, they decided to start building their homes in the area. The more permanent residences gave shape to the new settlement.

The village grew rapidly, so residents began meeting with the municipality of Naranjito in 1883 to rename the community and give it official stature. After several meetings, the residents decided to name their town Protección. Traders often passed through this area and found that the community was a safe places in which to rest and feed their livestock. These traders therefore referred to the community as "protección" (protection), which the residents decided was a suitable name. Another interpretation of the story is that the name was decided on because the community was protected in every way by providence. After the name change, the community grew more rapidly. People came from San Luis and Naranjito, Santa Bárbara, as well as from the Republics of Guatemala and El Salvador. In 1890, the first school was established in a house built by Florencio Martinez. Mr. Martinez, originally from the municipality of San Marcos, Santa Bárbara, was the first teacher to work in Protección.

In land title dated 26 December 1898, the area is referred to as communal land. Starting in 1910, the village started negotiations with the government in Santa Bárbara (the capital of the department of Santa Bárbara) to become a municipality. After many efforts and trips by community leaders to Santa Bárbara, the community was given the title of Municipality on 15 May 1927, initially encompassing the communities of Las Vueltas, La Reina, El Encanto, Las Loras, Zambrano and El Triunfo. The founding fathers were Don Florencio Martínez, Bartolomé Reyes and Julio Madrid, who worked enthusiastically for the progress of the community, despite many difficulties that were characteristic of those times.

== Geography ==
The municipality of Protección has an area of 151.6 square kilometres (58.5 mi^{2}). Protección is located in the 15.03 parallel north latitude and 88.65 west longitude. Protección is on the west side of the Honduran department of Santa Bárbara, and delimited to the north by the municipality of Macuelizo, to the south by the municipality of Naranjito, to the east by the municipality of San Luís, and to the west by the department of Copán.

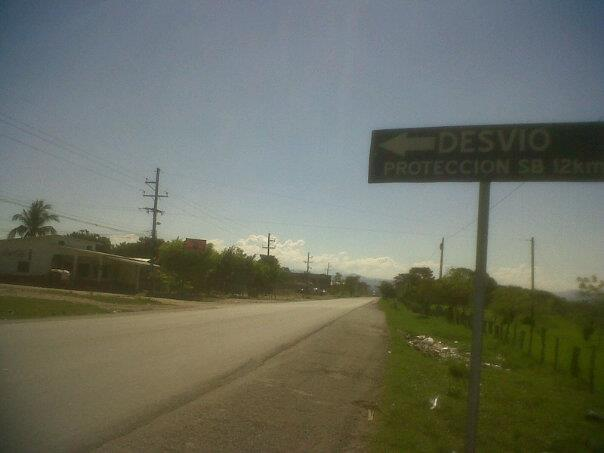
The Chalmeca turnoff to Protección SB.

A road extends for 13.8 kilometres (8.6 mi) between Protección and Chalmeca, which is connected to the International Highway running between San Pedro Sula and El Salvador. The road to Protección ballasted and passable at all times. There is also a small network of more than 61 kilometres (38 mi) of access roads to communities around Protección. These are passable primarily during the summer. The rains often make the surrounding roads impassable during the winter.

The topography of Protección is quite irregular. The average elevation is 980 metres (3,220 ft) above sea level. The municipality is surrounded by hills.

== Population ==
Protección has 14,272 inhabitants. Of these 7,205 are men or boys and 7,067 are women or girls. The majority of the population (53.34%) are 18 years old or younger. The population density of the Municipality of Protección equivalent to 55 people per square km (14,272 Inhabitants / km^{2} 261.6).

The major population growth occurs from west to east and currently has a rate of increase of 3.1% per year. The population cores are settled in the low areas in the surrounding hills. The population is grouped in 6 barrios (neighborhoods), 19 aldeas (villages), and 19 caseríos (hamlets). The following sections list the barrios, aldeas, caseríos in Protección.

=== Barrios (neighborhoods) ===
Protección's six barrios encompass the urban and administrative districts of Protección. Their 2,912 inhabitants account for 20.4 percent of the population of the municipality. The barrios range in size from 257 to 1169 inhabitants. These six barrios are often referred to collectively as the "town of Protección".

- Barrio Nuevo
- El Calvario
- El Centro
- San Cristobal
- El Edén
- Las Tejeras

=== Aldeas (villages) ===
The 8,634 inhabitants of Protección's 19 aldeas account for 60.5 percent of the population of the municipality. The aldeas range in size from 167 to 935 inhabitants.

- Buenos Aires
- El Chile
- Las Delicias
- El Encanto
- La Laguna
- Loma Encerrada
- Las Naranjas
- Nueva Victoria
- Nuevas Delicias
- Nuevo Corralitos
- Nuevo Porvenir
- El Ocote
- Pueblo Nuevo
- La Reina
- La Ruidosa
- El Triunfo
- Las Vueltas
- Zambrano
- El Zarzal

=== Caseríos (hamlets) ===
The 2,726 inhabitants of Protección's 19 caseríos account for 19.1 percent of the population of the municipality. The caseríos range in size from 22 to 317 inhabitants.

- Aldea Nueva
- El Anillal
- Copo Helado
- El Frijolillo
- El Güiscoyol
- El Higal
- Los Letreros
- La Libertad
- Monte la Virgen
- Nueva Angostura
- Nueva Ceibita
- Nuevos Horizontes
- La Posona
- La Presa
- San José
- La Tendida
- Tres Cruces
- Viejo Porvenir
- La Virtud

=== Demographics ===
At the time of the 2013 Honduras census, Protección municipality had a population of 16,374. Of these, 96.73% were Mestizo, 2.56% White, 0.37% Black or Afro-Honduran and 0.34% Indigenous.

== Culture ==
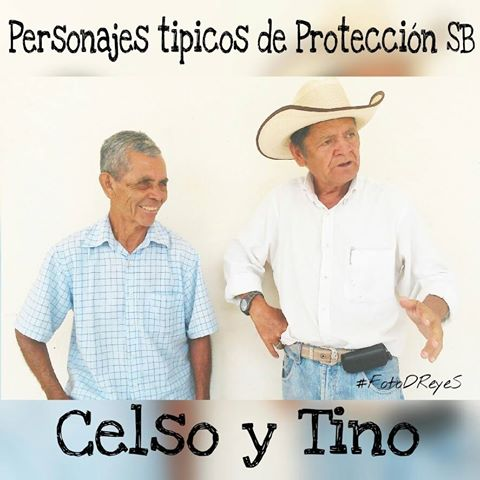
Two friendly individuals, characteristic of the people in Protección, Don Tino Plato and Celso Caspa are representative of the culture.

As in much of Honduras, the inhabitants of Protección are predominantly mestizo, with life centred primarily on agriculture. They are characteristically friendly, sociable and hospitable, assuming as part of their culture the variety of customs, traditions, and food that are typical to Honduras. The people are accustomed to using nicknames, for instance, don Celso Martinez is called Celso "Caspa", don Constantino Alvarado is called "Tino Plato", and doña Victoria Quijada is called "La Avioneta".

=== Celebrations ===
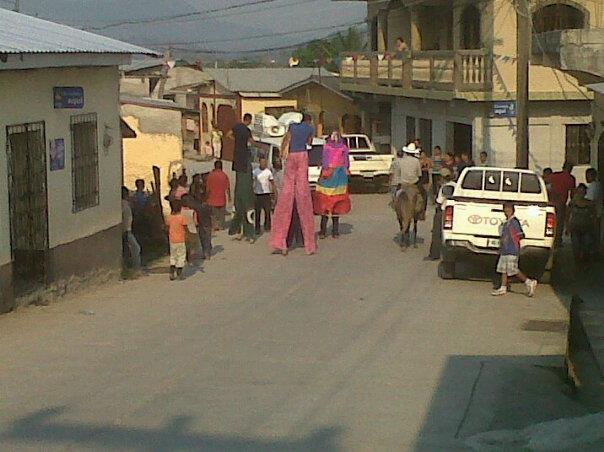
Celebration of the patron saint and anniversary of the creation of the municipality.

As in the rest of Honduras, a majority of the population is Roman Catholic, with a growing percentage of Evangelicals. As such they observe the Christian holidays, or La Navidad, and the Holy Week preceding Easter, called Semana Santa as times of celebration. Christmas Eve, known as Nochebuena, as in much of Honduras, is celebrated with a late-night dinner with family and friends followed by lighting off fireworks at midnight. For Holy Week, there is a procession. Most businesses are closed Thursday and Friday of Holy Week as they are national holidays.

In addition to Christmas and Easter, several other annual festivals and holidays are celebrated including the festival of the Patron Saint of Proteccion (Feria Patronal del San Isidro) on 1 May (although the actual day of the patron saint is 15 May). The population also celebrates the National holidays, such as 15 September, which is the day of Independence from Spain (Día de Independencia).

Festivals may include processions, beauty contests, music, food, disco or traditional dancing, live music, and fireworks.

=== Traditional Foods ===
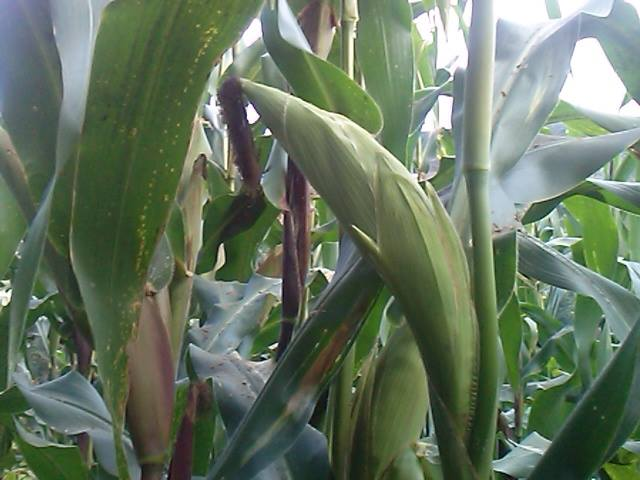
Maíz is used in Protección in a variety of typical foods such as tamales. When green it is used in the famous corn tamales, called montucas. Photograph by Darwin Reyes

Foods that are customarily eaten in Proteccion are tamales, "travelers" tamales (ticucos), sweet bread (marquezote), cornbread (pan de maiz), caramel milk (dulce en leche), tripe soup (sopa de mondongo), free-range chicken soup (sopa de gallina criolla), sweetened stewed squash (ayote en dulce), tamalitos, corn tamales (montucas), corn tortas (riguas de atole, typically with freshly harvested corn), sweet corn drink (atol de elote, typically with freshly harvested corn), Honduran red beans (frijoles), corn tortillas (tortilla de maíz), and fried cassava (yuca frita).

== Economy ==
The economic activities of the municipality are cultivation of coffee, subsistence farming of corn and beans, small scale commerce, services that support a farming community, including carpentry, construction, metal and mechanical workshops, tailors and dressmakers, barbers, and small commercial enterprises. The small villages and hamlets in the municipality have traditionally grown coffee for selling on a larger scale, and corn and beans for subsistence. Some communities grow bananas, pineapples and vegetables. Families are sometimes able to produce surplus corn and beans for selling in the urban area of the municipality or in the larger communities near the access road to Protección. Buyers sometimes also drive their pick-ups into villages and hamlets, especially during harvests, to purchase sacks of grains and coffee. Cattle are grown on a small scale.

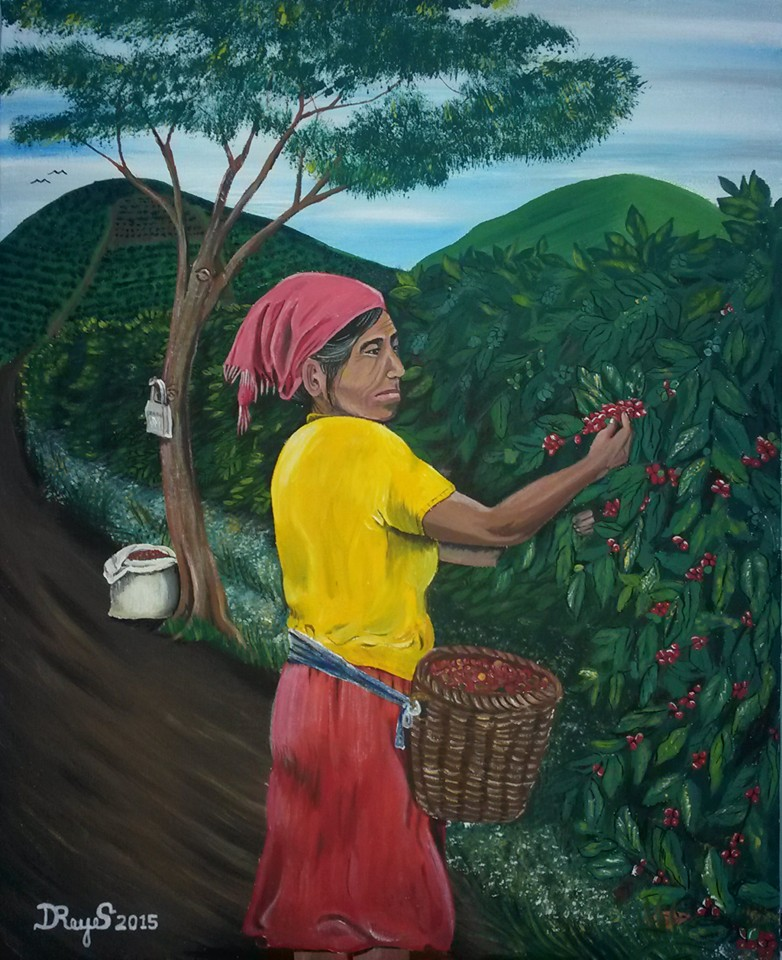
Painting by Darwin Reyes dedicated to the prodigious production of coffee in the department of Santa Bárbara.

Coffee represents about 30 percent of the agricultural production, corn and beans represent about 65 percent, and livestock grazing plays a smaller role. On average, 85% percent of the corn and beans are consumed locally or by the producers, while 15% are exported from the community. Small amounts of vegetables and fruits are grown primarily for local consumption. Fruits include bananas and plantains, avocados, mangos and papaya.

Trade of goods and services occurs predominantly in the primary barrios of Protección. There also are the offices of the various public agencies that serve the municipality. As of 2012, the working age population represented about 70% of the population. Thirty eight percent of the working age population is gainfully employed, 85 percent including the gainfully employed are occupied, although many of those either part-time or underemployed. The predominant professions are homemaker, farmer, labourers, retailers, maids, construction workers, primary school teachers, carpenters, surveyors, cigar makers, mechanics, milliners and laundresses.

Under employment exists particularly among the women. They participate primarily in family activities. They help with agricultural tasks, especially in picking coffee or tending to other aspects of coffee production. Women receive some income from breeding poultry and egg sales, sewing, cutting coffee, fish farming, pig growing, micro-business, vegetable processing, and running small groceries and eateries.

== Climate ==
The climate of this district is temperate with an average temperature of 20 °C (68.0 °F) degrees. The average annual precipitation is 1,300 mm (51 in) per year. Honduras has two seasons. The rainy season is referred to as winter and the dry season as summer. The major portion the rain received by Protección falls during between June and November, with the dry season extending from the end of January through May.

== Land Tenure ==
Land tenure is always a problem. Thirty-five percent of the population of Protección have no land, while 65% of the population have land, but ownership tends to be in hands of wealthy individuals or corporate entities. There are a few community lands that resulted from land redistribution efforts, such as the community of La Ruidosa, where the farmers work plots of the land but do not have ownership. Communities such as La Laguna, El Corozal among others are on private land that have not been authenticated by the inhabitants.

== Water Resources ==
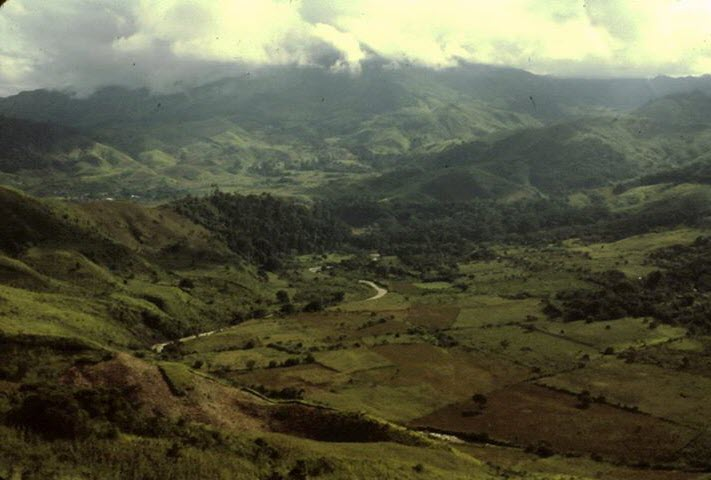
Río Blanco, in the Municipality of Protección

Protección is within the watershed covered by the Chiquila sub-basin project, which is focused on protecting water sources in the region. The most important sources of water for Protección are La Angostura, Cerro Redondo, Copo Helado, and Las Moras, which act as watersheds that drain into important water basins of the country. These are the Jicatuyo, Chamelecón, and Ulúa, and part of the Jicatuyo. The only river running through the municipality is the Río Blanco.

== Forest resources ==
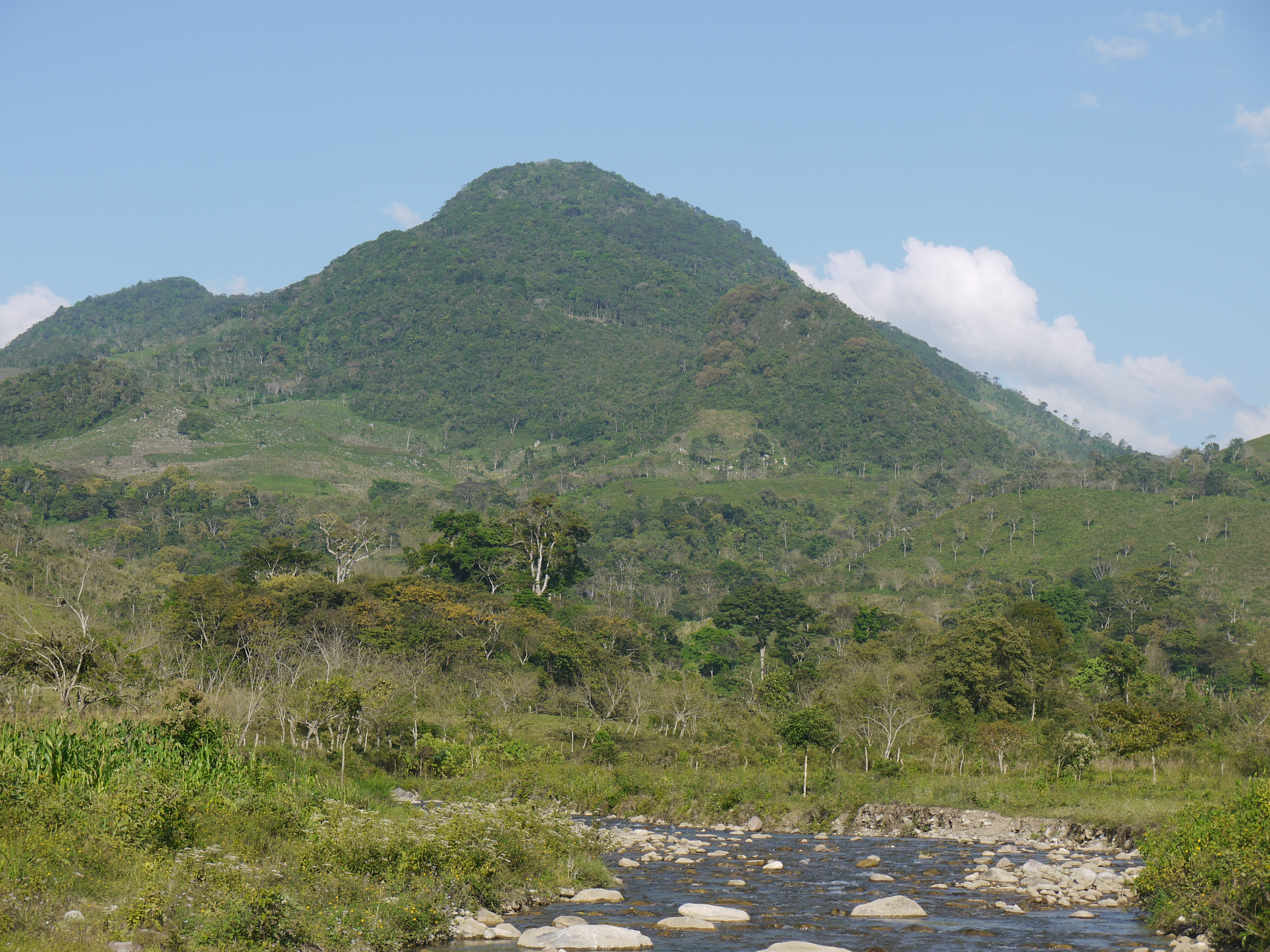
Terrain near the village of Palma Real, an aldea in San Luis, adjacent to the Municipality of Protección.

The area is covered with pine forests. Pinus caribaea is more common at lower elevations while you are more likely to encounter Pinus maximinoi above 1,300 metres (4,300 ft) m. The understory is composed of smaller species, such as oaks, nance, oak bush, grasses, ferns and squat. There has been extensive deforestation by individuals moving into the region and up the hillsides in search of a plot of land on which to support a family. Traditional slash and burn agricultural methods contribute to the problem of deforestation along with cattle pasture seeding, and clearing land for coffee production. Within the past few decades there has been deforestation throughout the coffee growing region of Central America due to introduction of higher-producing coffee that does not require shade.

== See also ==
- Honduran cuisine
