= El Mochito mine =

Silver and zinc mine in Honduras

Coordinates: 14°49′59″N 88°4′59″W

El Mochito mine is an underground zinc and silver mine in Honduras that is owned by Kirungu Corporation. The mine is located near the municipality of Las Vegas in northwest section Honduras. At approximately 88 km (55 mi) northeast of the mine, the closest major city is San Pedro Sula, which also acts as the commercial centre of the country.

== History ==
The deposit was discovered in 1938. The Rosario Mining Company purchased the property in 1943 and began production in 1948. American Pacific Mining Corporation purchased the property in September 1987, and in March 1990, Breakwater Resources acquired American Pacific and the mine.

In August 2011, Nyrstar successfully completed its acquisition of Breakwater Resources. On December 20, 2016 the mine was acquired by the Canadian firm Morumbi Resources, which renamed itself to Ascendant Resources effective December 21, 2016.

== See also ==
- El Toqui mine
- Nanisivik Mine
