= La Esperanza Rugby Club =

(Honduras) Lenca Rugby
- Full name: Lenca Rugby, Honduras
- Union: FHR
- Founded: 2012
- Ground(s): Santa Anita, La Esperanza

Lenca Rugby (La Esperanza Rugby Football Club) is a rugby club based in La Esperanza, Intibuca, Honduras. It is affiliated with the Federacion Hondurena de Rugby. The club currently fields a 15s and 7s senior team. Members of the club are also responsible for training youth players in LA Eserpanza.

== Honours ==
- 2nd Place in National Sevens Tournament on Roatan in 2014
- 2nd Place in National Fifteens Tournament in La Ceiba in 2014
- Took part in first ever recorded inter club fifteens game in Honduras against Roatan Pirates in August 2013
- Took part in first ever recorded inter club tens game in Honduras against Tegucigalpa Tapires in 2013.
