= Santa Bárbara Department, Honduras =

Santa Bárbara Department Departamento de Santa Bárbara
- Department
- Flag

- Location of Santa Bárbara in Honduras
- Coordinates: 14°55′N 88°14′W
- Country: Honduras
- Municipalities: 28
- Villages: 370
- Founded: 28 June 1825 (Note: Santa Bárbara was one of the first 7 departments in which the national territory was divided in the first political division of Honduras in 1825.)
- Capital city: Santa Bárbara
- Largest city: Quimistán

Government
  - Type: Departmental
  - Governor: Arnold Avelar (2022–2026) (LibRe)

Area
  - Total: 5,013 km^{2} (1,936 sq mi)

Population (2015)
  - Total: 434,896
  - Density: 86.75/km^{2} (224.7/sq mi)

GDP (Nominal, 2015 US dollar)
  - Total: $1.3 billion (2023)
  - Per capita: $2,300 (2023)

GDP (PPP, 2015 int. dollar)
  - Total: $2.6 billion (2023)
  - Per capita: $4,900 (2023)
- Time zone: UTC-6 (CDT)
- Postal code: 22101
- ISO 3166 code: HN-SB
- HDI (2021): 0.593 medium · 9th of 18
- Statistics derived from Consult INE online database: Population and Housing Census 2013

Santa Bárbara is one of the 18 departments (departamentos) into which Honduras is divided. The departmental capital is Santa Bárbara.

== Geography ==
The department covers a total surface area of 5,115 km^{2} (1,975 sq mi) and, in 2005, had an estimated population of 368,298 people.

== Economy ==
The department, historically, is known for harvesting mahogany and cedar trees for exportation.

== Municipalities ==
1. Arada
2. Atima
3. Azacualpa
4. Ceguaca
5. Chinda
6. Concepción del Norte
7. Concepción del Sur
8. El Níspero
9. Gualala
10. Ilama
11. Las Vegas
12. Macuelizo
13. Naranjito
14. Nueva Frontera
15. Nuevo Celilac
16. Petoa
17. Protección
18. Quimistán
19. San Francisco de Ojuera
20. San José de Colinas
21. San Luis
22. San Marcos
23. San Nicolás
24. San Pedro Zacapa
25. Santa Bárbara
26. Santa Rita
27. San Vicente Centenario
28. Trinidad
