= Jicatuyo River =

Coordinates: 14.9772°N 88.2608°W

Location
- Country: Honduras

The Jicatuyo River is a river in the Santa Barbara Department in Honduras which flows into the Ulúa River.

== See also ==
- List of rivers of Honduras
