= Petoa =

- Municipality
- Location in Honduras
- Coordinates: 15°16′N 88°17′W
- Country: Honduras
- Department: Santa Bárbara
- Villages: 14

Area
  - Total: 203.5 km^{2} (78.6 sq mi)

Population (2013)
  - Total: 12,135
  - Density: 59.63/km^{2} (154.4/sq mi)
- Climate: Aw

Petoa is a municipality in the department of Santa Bárbara in Honduras. Covering approximately 203.5 km^{2} (78.6 sq mi), it had a population of 12,135 individuals in 2013.

== History ==
In the population census of 1791, Petoa is mentioned as the head of a curacy and it is represented as a municipality in the Quimistán District in the 1889 political maps.

== Geography ==
Petoa is a municipality in the department of Santa Bárbara in northern Honduras. Covering approximately 203.5 km^{2} (78.6 sq mi), it borders the municipalities of Quimistán to the north, Villanueva, Cortés to the east, and San Marcos to the west. The municipality has a mean elevation of approximately 253 m (830 ft) above sea level. The Chamelecón and Cacaulapa rivers pass through the region. The region has a tropical monsoon climate. The soil is prone to erosion particularly along the river banks, where embankments have been constructed. The town is located about 44 km (27 mi) from the Ramón Villeda Morales International Airport.

== Demographics ==
At the time of the 2013 Honduras census, Petoa municipality had a population of 12,135. Of these, 83.87% were Mestizo, 15.18% White, 0.68% Indigenous, 0.20% Black or Afro-Honduran and 0.07% others. According to the INE projection, Petoa had a population of 13,121 in 2022, marking gradual growth since the 2013 census of 12,135. Population growth rate averaged around 1.92 % annually between 1950 and 2013. Gender distribution was almost equal and nearly 86% of the population was rural.
