= San Antonio de Cortés =

- Municipality
- Location within Honduras
- Coordinates: 15°07′N 88°02′W
- Country: Honduras
- Department: Cortés
- Municipality: San Antonio de Cortés

Government
  - Type: Democratic Municipality
  - Mayor: Jesús Eduardo Núñez Serrano (PL)

Area
  - Municipality: 221 km^{2} (85 sq mi)
- Elevation: 542 m (1,778 ft)

Population (2020 projection)
  - Municipality: 22,884
  - Density: 104/km^{2} (268/sq mi)
  - Urban: 8,677
- Time zone: UTC-6 (Central America)

San Antonio de Cortés is a town, with a population of 5,509 (2013 census), and a municipality in the Honduran department of Cortés.
