= Trinidad, Honduras =

Municipality in Honduras

Trinidad
- Municipality
- Location in Honduras
- Coordinates: 15°8′30″N 88°14′00″W
- Country: Honduras
- Department: Santa Bárbara
- Villages: 22

Area
  - Municipality: 205 km^{2} (79 sq mi)

Population (2020 projection)
  - Municipality: 21,241
  - Density: 104/km^{2} (268/sq mi)
  - Urban: 9,025
- Time zone: UTC-6 (Central America)

Trinidad (Spanish pronunciation: [tɾiniˈðað]) is a town, with a population of 20,564, and a municipality in the Honduran department of Santa Bárbara.

The townspeople claim to have Jewish sephardim ancestors; it is also home of General Knox, who as a Commerce Secretary for Honduras signed the Knox Treaty between the United States and Honduras.

It is also home to a street named after Shimon Agur former Israeli Ambassador and to a sports center named Plaza Jerusalem, because it was built with help from Israel.

== Demographics ==
At the time of the 2013 Honduras census, Trinidad municipality had a population of 19,593. Of these, 76.06% were Mestizo, 22.44% White, 0.95% Black or Afro-Honduran, 0.50% Indigenous and 0.06% others.

== Arts and culture ==
Trinidad is home to the Feria Paseo Real de las Chimeneas Gigantes (Royal Walk Fair of the Giant Chimneys), a tradition celebrated every December since 2001. The giant chimneys were inspired by the ancient tradition of celebrating the day of the Immaculate Conception in December. The fair features huge sculptures made out of newspaper, wire, and paint, created by local artists. Each year has a different theme, 2018 theme was El Circo (The Circus), in 2017 was Mundo Acuático (Waterworld), in 2016 was Defendiendo a la Madre Naturaleza (Defending Mother Earth). The three-day event ends with the burning of the giant chimneys.

== Notable people ==
- Héctor Zelaya, football player
