= Ulúa River =

River in Honduras

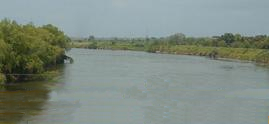
- Ulúa river

Location
- Country: Honduras

Physical characteristics
- Source
  - location: Intibucá, Honduras
- Mouth: Caribbean Sea
  - location: Honduras
  - coordinates: 15°55′7″N 87°43′10″W
  - elevation: 0 m (0 ft)
- Length: 240 km (150 mi)
- Basin size: 22,817 km^{2} (8,810 sq mi)
- Discharge
  - average: 550 m^{3}/s (19,000 cu ft/s)

The Ulúa River (Spanish: Río Ulúa, Spanish pronunciation: [ˈri.o wˈlu.a]) is a river in western Honduras. It rises in the central mountainous area of the country close to La Paz and runs 240 kilometres (150 mi) approximately due northwards to the east end of the Gulf of Honduras at 15°55′N 87°43′W. En route, it is joined by the Sulaco River, the Jicatuyo River, the Otoro River and the Chamelecón River. The Ulúa River valley is famed for its ornate calcite vessels that date from the Mayan times. One of them can be found in the British Museum's collection.

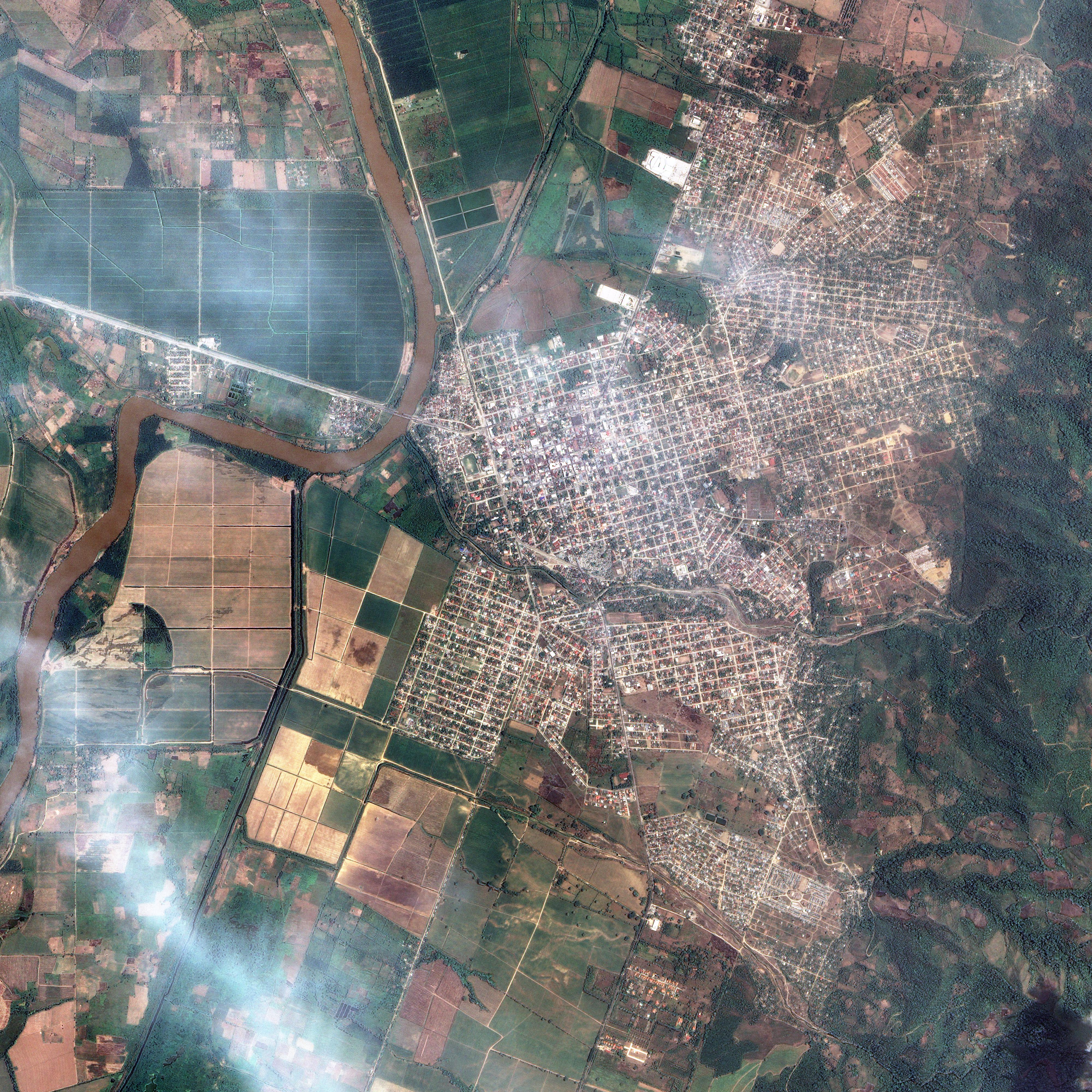
Ulua River winds through El Progreso
