= Santa Bárbara, Honduras =

Santa Bárbara
- Municipality
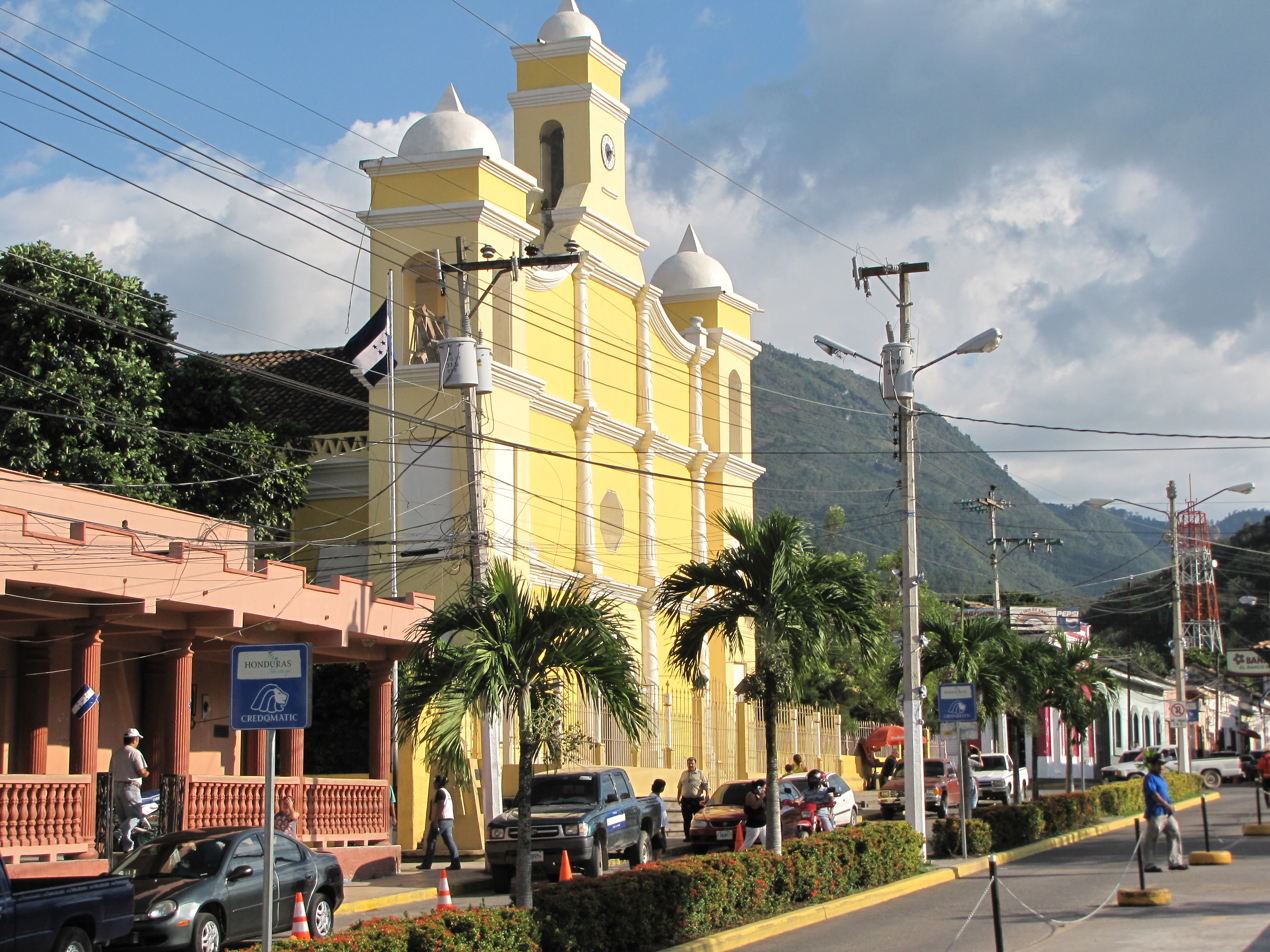
- Catholic church in Santa Bárbara
- Nickname: Sta. Barbara
- Location in Honduras
- Coordinates: 14°55′N 88°14′W
- Country: Honduras
- Department: Santa Bárbara
- Villages: 20

Area
  - Total: 301 km^{2} (116 sq mi)

Population (2023 projection)
  - Total: 49,747
  - Density: 165/km^{2} (428/sq mi)
- Time zone: UTC-6 (Central America)
- Climate: Am

Santa Bárbara, with a population of 30,690 (2023 calculation), is the capital city of the Santa Bárbara Department of Honduras and the municipal seat of Santa Bárbara Municipality.

== Demographics ==
At the time of the 2013 Honduras census, Santa Bárbara municipality had a population of 41,736. Of these, 72.45% were Mestizo, 22.00% White, 2.41% Indigenous (2.01% Lenca, 0.29% Chʼortiʼ), 1.50% Black or Afro-Honduran and 1.64% others.

== Health ==
The Santa Bárbara Hospital is located in the North Quarter of the city. Since 1957 it has served people from both the Santa Bárbara Department and the department of Lempira.

== Food ==
Typical foods of the region are chilate, ticuco, atol of corn, chicken and pork tamales, yucca with chicharrón, torrejas, and horchata.

== Economy ==
This city is known for crafts and the cultivation of coffee. The local economy depends mostly on these traditional activities.

== Villages ==
The Santa Bárbara municipality has the following villages:

- Agua Blanquita
- Cerro Grande
- Coquillal
- El Salitre
- El Cielito
- El Zapote
- El Diez y Ocho o Miraflores
- El Moguete
- El Portillo del Jarro
- Guayabito
- Gualjoco
- Inguaya
- La Estancia
- La Zona
- La Unión el Dorado
- La Ceibita
- La Cuesta
- La Unión del Dorado
- Las Crucitas
- Las Palmas
- Las Lagunas
- Las Quebradas
- Los Laureles
- Los Anises
- Los Bancos
- Macholoa
- Orconcitos
- Plancitos de Suyapa
- Río Seco
- San Jerónimo el Pinal
- San Gaspar de Tablones
- San Luis Planes
- Santa Rosalía
- Santa Rita de Oriente
- Santa Bárbara

== Notable people ==
- Saturnino Bográn Bonilla (es), born in Yuscarán, grew up in the city of Santa Bárbara, was deputy and Secretary in the Directory of the National Congress in 1846–1847, Minister of Finance and War 1867.
- General Luis Bográn, President of Honduras from 1883 to 1891, an important figure in the Liberal Reformation.
- Doctor Francisco Bográn, President of Honduras 1919 to 1920.
- Edmond L. Bográn, leader in the financial area, proprietary partner of the newspaper El Tiempo (Honduras) (es).
- Lawyer Efraín Bu Girón, President of the National Congress and Minister in the 1980s.
- Guadalupe Jerezano Mejía, Vice President of Honduras 1994-1998
- María José Alvarado, Miss Honduras World 2014.
- José Ramón Madrid Padilla, mathematician.
- Xiomara Castro, 39th President of Honduras 2022-2026
- Fátima Juárez, politician
