= 2005–06 Honduran Liga Nacional =

Liga Nacional
- Season: 2005–06
- Champions: Apertura: Olimpia; Clausura: Olimpia
- Relegated: Hispano
- UNCAF Interclub Cup: Olimpia; Victoria; Marathón
- Matches played: 192
- Goals scored: 473 (2.46 per match)
- Biggest home win: OLI 6–0 VIC
- Biggest away win: HIS 1–5 VIC; VID 1–5 VIC
- Highest scoring: VIC 5–4 VID
- All statistics correct as of 28 May 2006.

The 2005–06 season in the Honduran Liga Nacional was the 41st in its history and determined the 47th and 48th champions in the league.

== 2005–06 teams ==
- Hispano (Comayagua) (promoted)
- Marathón (San Pedro Sula)
- Motagua (Tegucigalpa)
- Olimpia (Tegucigalpa)
- Platense (Puerto Cortés)
- Real España (San Pedro Sula)
- Universidad (Danlí)
- Municipal Valencia (Tegucigalpa)
- Victoria (La Ceiba)
- Vida (La Ceiba)

== Apertura ==
The Apertura tournament was played from 6 August to 18 December 2005. C.D. Olimpia obtained its 19th national championship.

=== Regular season ===
==== Standings ====
Pos	Team	Pld	W	D	L	GF	GA	GD	Pts	Qualification or relegation
1	Olimpia	18	11	4	3	38	17	+21	37	Qualified to the Semifinals
2	Victoria	18	9	3	6	30	27	+3	30	Qualified to the Semifinals
3	Marathón	18	7	8	3	30	26	+4	29	Qualified to the Semifinals
4	Platense	18	8	3	7	28	34	−6	27	Qualified to the Semifinals
5	Universidad	18	6	6	6	19	21	−2	24	
6	Real España	18	6	5	7	23	23	0	23	
7	Hispano	18	5	7	6	21	21	0	22	
8	Municipal Valencia	18	5	5	8	15	22	−7	20	
9	Vida	18	4	6	8	22	25	−3	18	
10	Motagua	18	3	5	10	16	26	−10	14	

Updated to match(es) played on 3 December 2005. Source:

==== Results ====
As of 3 December 2005

Home \ Away	HIS	MAR	MOT	OLI	PLA	RES	UNI	VAL	VIC	VID
Hispano		1–1	1–1	0–1	0–1	3–2	3–0	2–1	0–0	0–0
Marathón	4–4		3–2	0–2	2–2	1–1	3–1	2–0	2–3	1–1
Motagua	1–2	3–0		1–1	2–1	0–1	0–1	0–0	0–2	1–0
Olimpia	1–0	1–1	1–0		5–2	3–0	1–3	5–1	6–0	0–0
Platense	2–1	1–2	2–0	3–2		3–2	1–1	0–1	3–2	0–1
Real España	2–0	1–1	2–0	0–2	2–2		1–1	3–0	2–1	2–0
Universidad	1–0	1–1	2–1	2–3	1–2	0–0		1–0	1–1	2–1
Municipal Valencia	0–0	1–2	2–2	1–1	1–2	1–0	1–0		3–0	1–1
Victoria	2–2	0–1	4–1	3–1	3–0	2–0	1–0	1–0		5–4
Vida	1–2	1–3	1–1	0–2	6–1	3–2	1–1	0–1	1–0	

Source: RSSSF
Legend: Blue = home team win; Yellow = draw; Red = away team win.

=== Final round ===
==== Semifinals ====
===== Olimpia vs Platense =====
8 December 2005 1st leg	Platense	0–2	Olimpia	Puerto Cortés, Cortés
19:30 (UTC−06:00)			Palacios 53'; Velásquez 85'	Stadium: Estadio Excélsior

11 December 2005 2nd leg	Olimpia	0–1	Platense	Tegucigalpa, Francisco Morazán
16:00 (UTC−06:00)			Vega 53'	Stadium: Estadio Tiburcio Carías Andino

- Olimpia won 2–1 on aggregate score.

===== Victoria vs Marathón =====
7 December 2005 1st leg	Marathón	3–0	Victoria	San Pedro Sula, Cortés
19:30 (UTC−06:00)	Ramírez 56' 83'; Cacho 88'			Stadium: Estadio Olímpico Metropolitano

11 December 2005 2nd leg	Victoria	1–2	Marathón	La Ceiba, Atlántida
15:00 (UTC−06:00)	Brown 21'		Ramírez 48'; Güity 75'	Stadium: Estadio Nilmo Edwards

- Marathón won 5–1 on aggregate score.

==== Final ====
===== Olimpia vs Marathón =====
15 December 2005 1st leg	Marathón	2–1	Olimpia	San Pedro Sula, Cortés
19:30 (UTC−06:00)	Cacho 7'; Simovic 90+2'		Emílio 1'	Stadium: Estadio Olímpico Metropolitano

Marathón	Olimpia

GK	27	(Panama) Donaldo González
RB	23	(Honduras) Mauricio Sabillón
CB	4	(Panama) Ángel Hill	Booked
CB	5	(Honduras) Darwin Pacheco
LB	3	(Honduras) Behiker Bustillo	Booked
CM	–	(Honduras) Ástor Henríquez	(substituted off) 73'
RM	18	(Argentina) Pablo Genovese	(substituted off) 84'
LM	20	(Honduras) Narciso Fernández
AM	25	(Argentina) Santiago Autino	(substituted off) 49'
CF	11	(Honduras) Luis Ramírez
CF	–	(Honduras) Pompilio Cacho
Substitutions:
FW	17	(Uruguay) Edgardo Simovic	(substituted in) 49'
FW	32	(Honduras) José Güity	(substituted in) 73'
MF	13	(Honduras) Dennis Ferrera	(substituted in) 84'
Manager:
(Mexico) Juan de Dios Castillo

GK	–	(Panama) Ricardo James
RB	–	(Honduras) missing
CB	–	(Honduras) Mario Beata	Booked
CB	–	(Honduras) Rony Morales
LB	6	(Honduras) Maynor Figueroa
CM	–	(Honduras) Danilo Turcios
CM	–	(Honduras) Wilson Palacios
AM	–	(Argentina) Danilo Tosello	(substituted off) 55'
AM	–	(Honduras) missing
CF	11	(Honduras) Wilmer Velásquez	(substituted off) 78'
CF	21	(Brazil) Luciano Emílio
Substitutions:
FW	9	(Honduras) Juan Manuel Cárcamp	(substituted in) 55'
MF	–	(Honduras) Reynaldo Tilguath	(substituted in) 78'
Manager:
(Honduras) Nahúm Espinoza

18 December 2005 2nd leg	Olimpia	2–0	Marathón	Tegucigalpa, Francisco Morazán
19:30 (UTC−06:00)	Emílio 62'; Palacios 79'			Stadium: Estadio Tiburcio Carías Andino

- Olimpia won 3–2 on aggregate score.

2005–06 Apertura champion
Olimpia
19th title

=== Awards ===
- Champion:
  Olimpia
  Awarded 360,000 Lempiras
- Sub Champion:
  Marathon
  Awarded 155,000 Lempiras
- Fair Play Award:
  Valencia
  Awarded 50,000 Lempiras
- Top Goal Scorer:
  Francisco Ramírez
  Awarded 30,000 Lempiras
- Best Goalkeeper:
  Noel Valladares
  Awarded 30,000 Lempiras

=== Squads ===
Hispano
Marathón
(Honduras) José César "Vavá" Güity	(Honduras) Mauricio Sabillón	(Honduras) Luis "Bombero" Ramírez
(Honduras) Edgar Daniel Núñez	(Uruguay) Edgardo Damián Simovic	(Honduras) Víctor Coello
(Honduras) Narciso "Kalusha" Fernández	(Honduras) Darwin Pacheco	(Honduras) Mario Berríos
(Honduras) Mariano Acevedo	(Honduras) Christian Garden	(Honduras) Luis Ramos
(Honduras) Pompilio Cacho Valerio	(Argentina) Santiago Autino	(Honduras) Astor Henríquez
(Honduras) Behiker Bustillo	(Argentina) Pablo Genovese	(Honduras) Dennis Ferrera
(Honduras) Luis Guifarro	(Honduras) Luis Santamaría	(Panama) Donaldo González
Motagua
(Brazil) Marcelo Ferreira Martins	(Honduras) Víctor Bernárdez	(Honduras) Edy Vásquez
(Honduras) Carlos Alberto Salinas
Olimpia
(Argentina) Danilo Tosello	(Honduras) Noel Valladares	(Honduras) Wilmer Velásquez
(Honduras) Donis Escober	(Brazil) Luciano Emílio	(Honduras) Milton Palacios Suazo
(Honduras) Wilson Palacios	(Honduras) Hendry Thomas	(Honduras) Maynor Figueroa
Platense
(Honduras) Francisco Ramirez	(Honduras) Eddy Vega	(Honduras) Marvin Sánchez
Real España
(Honduras) Elder Vildad Valladares	(Honduras) Marlon José Peña	(Honduras) Yull Narciso Arzú
Universidad
(Honduras) Wilmer Daniel Ramos
Valencia
Victoria
(Honduras) Ricardo Gabriel "Gato" Canales	(Honduras) Héctor Armando "Tanqueta" Flores	(Honduras) Eduardo Bennett
(Honduras) Jaime Rosales
Vida

== Clausura ==
Honduras Clausura 2005-06 is the closing season of Liga Nacional de Honduras, the first division national football league in Honduras. It followed the Honduras 05-06 apertura opening season. The winner competes in the 2006 UNCAF Club Tournament. The league games started 21 January 2006 and it finished on 28 May 2006.

=== Regular season ===
==== Standings ====
Pos	Team	Pld	W	D	L	GF	GA	GD	Pts	Qualification or relegation
1	Olimpia	18	10	7	1	27	13	+14	37	Qualified to the Semifinals
2	Victoria	18	8	7	3	31	18	+13	31	Qualified to the Semifinals
3	Municipal Valencia	18	9	3	6	20	13	+7	30	Qualified to the Semifinals
4	Motagua	18	8	5	5	24	20	+4	29	Qualified to the Semifinals
5	Vida	18	6	9	3	21	21	0	27	
6	Real España	18	5	8	5	15	17	−2	23	
7	Platense	18	5	7	6	19	21	−2	22	
8	Universidad	18	3	8	7	15	24	−9	17	
9	Marathón	18	2	5	11	16	27	−11	11	
10	Hispano	18	2	5	11	18	30	−12	11	

Updated to match(es) played on 7 May 2006. Source:

==== Results ====
As of 7 May 2006

Home \ Away	HIS	MAR	MOT	OLI	PLA	RES	UNI	VAL	VIC	VID
Hispano		1–1	0–2	1–1	0–0	2–0	1–2	2–3	1–5	0–0
Marathón	2–1		4–0	0–2	2–2	0–1	0–0	0–2	1–1	1–2
Motagua	2–2	3–1		0–1	2–0	0–1	1–1	1–0	3–0	2–1
Olimpia	2–0	1–0	0–1		1–0	0–0	2–2	1–0	2–2	2–2
Platense	2–1	1–0	2–1	2–2		3–3	0–1	1–0	0–2	0–0
Real España	2–1	3–0	1–1	0–2	0–3		0–2	2–0	1–1	0–0
Universidad	1–2	2–2	1–1	0–3	1–1	0–0		1–2	0–0	0–1
Municipal Valencia	1–0	1–0	2–0	1–2	2–0	1–0	3–0		0–0	1–1
Victoria	2–0	2–1	2–2	1–2	2–1	0–0	3–0	2–1		1–2
Vida	3–2	2–1	1–2	1–1	1–1	1–1	2–1	0–0	1–5	

Source: RSSSF
Legend: Blue = home team win; Yellow = draw; Red = away team win.

=== Final round ===
==== Semifinals ====
===== Olimpia vs Motagua =====
11 May 2006 1st leg	Motagua	2–1	Olimpia	Tegucigalpa, Francisco Morazán
19:30 (UTC−06:00)	Reyes; Torlacoff		Emílio	Stadium: Estadio Tiburcio Carías Andino

14 May 2006 2nd leg	Olimpia	2–1	Motagua	Tegucigalpa, Francisco Morazán
16:00 (UTC−06:00)	Emílio		Torlacoff 90' (pen.)	Stadium: Estadio Tiburcio Carías Andino

- Olimpia 3–3 Motagua on aggregate score; Olimpia advanced on better regular season performance.

===== Victoria vs Valencia =====
11 May 2006 1st leg	Municipal Valencia	1–1	Victoria	Choluteca, Choluteca
(UTC−06:00)				Stadium: Estadio Fausto Flores Lagos

14 May 2006 2nd leg	Victoria	3–0	Municipal Valencia	La Ceiba, Atlántida
15:00 (UTC−06:00)				Stadium: Estadio Nilmo Edwards

- Victoria won 4–1 on aggregate score.

==== Final ====
20 May 2006

Victoria	3–3	Olimpia
Naif 34'; Rosales 44' 89'		Velásquez 51'; Palacios 63'; Emílio 70'

Estadio Nilmo Edwards
La Ceiba
Attendance: 15,000
Referee: Ricardo Zelaya

Victoria	Olimpia

GK	–	(Honduras) John Bodden
RB	–	(Honduras) Nahúm Güity
CB	–	(Honduras) Jaime Rosales
CB	–	(Brazil) Fabio de Souza
LB	–	(Panama) Anthony Torres
CM	–	(Honduras) Máximo Arzú
RM	–	(Honduras) Carlos Morán	Substituted off
LM	–	(Honduras) Marvin Chávez
AM	–	(Honduras) José Grant
CF	–	(Honduras) Mitchel Brown	Substituted off
Substitutions:
FW	–	(Argentina) Alejandro Naif	Substituted in
MF	–	(Honduras) Ronald Maradiaga	Substituted in
Manager:
(Honduras) Jorge Pineda

GK	–	(Panama) Ricardo James
RB	–	(Honduras) Wilfredo Barahona
CB	–	(Honduras) Milton Palacios
CB	–	(Honduras) Rony Morales
LB	–	(Honduras) Maynor Figueroa
CM	–	(Honduras) Oscar Bonilla
CM	–	(Honduras) Hendry Thomas
RM	–	(Honduras) Danilo Turcios	Substituted off
LM	–	(Honduras) Wilson Palacios
CF	–	(Brazil) Luciano Emilio
CF	11	(Honduras) Wilmer Velásquez	Substituted off
Substitutions:
MF	–	(Honduras) Reynaldo Tilguath	Substituted in
MF	–	(Honduras) Walter Hernández	Substituted in
Manager:
(Honduras) Nahúm Espinoza

28 May 2006

Olimpia	3–1	Victoria
Morales 29' James 67' Alejandro Naif 89'		Emilio 44'

Estadio Tiburcio Carías Andino
Tegucigalpa
Attendance: 31,951
Referee: Benigno Pineda

Olimpia	Victoria

GK	–	(Panama) Ricardo James
RB	–	(Honduras) Wilfredo Barahona
CB	–	(Honduras) Milton Palacios
CB	–	(Honduras) Rony Morales	(substituted off) 53'
LB	–	(Honduras) Maynor Figueroa
CM	–	(Honduras) Oscar Bonilla
CM	–	(Honduras) Hendry Thomas
CM	–	(Honduras) Oscar García
CM	–	(Honduras) Wilson Palacios
CF	–	(Brazil) Luciano Emilio	Substituted off
CF	11	(Honduras) Wilmer Velásquez	Substituted off
Substitutions:
DF	–	(Honduras) Arnold Cruz	(substituted in) 53'
FW	9	(Honduras) Juan Cárcamo	Substituted in
MF	–	(Honduras) José Pineda	Substituted in
Manager:
Nahúm Espinoza

GK	–	(Honduras) John Bodden
RB	–	(Honduras) Gerson Vásquez
CB	–	(Honduras) Jaime Rosales
CB	–	(Brazil) Fábio de Souza	(substituted off) 68'	Booked
LB	–	(Panama) Anthony Torres	Booked
CM	–	(Honduras) Máximo Arzú
CM	–	(Honduras) Ignacio Mejía	Substituted off
CM	–	(Honduras) Ronald Maradiaga	(substituted off) 75'
AM	–	(Honduras) José Grant
CF	–	(Honduras) Mitchel Brown	Booked
CF	–	(Argentina) Alejandro Naif	Booked
Substitutions:
DF	–	(Honduras) Miguel Martínez	(substituted in) 68'
FW	–	(Honduras) Héctor Flores	(substituted in) 75'
MF	–	(Honduras) Carlos Morán	Substituted in
Manager:
(Honduras) Jorge Pineda

- Olimpia won 6–4 on aggregate score.

2005–06 Clausura champion
Olimpia
20th title

=== Top Goal Scorer ===
Position	Player	Scored for	Goals
1	Luciano Emilio	Olimpia	13
2	Pedrinho	Motagua	9
3	Denilson Costa	Platense	8
-	Héctor Flores	Victoria	8
5	Eduardo Bennet	Vida	6
-	Jaime Rosales	Victoria	6
-	Ney Costa	Hispano	6
8	Luis Santamaria	Marathón	5
-	Alejandro Naif	Victoria	5
-	Allan Lalín	Real España	5
-	Wilson Palacios	Olimpia	5

=== Squads ===
Hispano
(Brazil) Ney Costa
Marathón
(Honduras) Emil Martínez	(Honduras) Víctor Coello	(Uruguay) Mauricio Nani
(Honduras) Luis Santamaría	(Honduras) Francisco Ramírez	(Honduras) Carlos Oliva
(Honduras) Pompilio Cacho Valerio	(Honduras) Mariano Acevedo	(Honduras) Dennis Ferrera
(Honduras) José Güity	(Honduras) Óscar Zepeda
Motagua
(Honduras) Milton "Jocón" Reyes	(Brazil) Pedro Aparecido Santana	(Uruguay) Óscar Horacio Torlacoff
(Brazil) Marcelo Ferreira Martins	(Honduras) Elvis Scott
Olimpia
(Argentina) Danilo Tosello	(Honduras) Milton Palacios	(Honduras) Wilson Palacios
(Honduras) Wilmer Neal "Matador" Velásquez	(Brazil) Luciano Emilio	(Honduras) Ramón Castillo
Platense
(Brazil) Denislon Costa	(Argentina) José Mauricio Pacini
Real España
(Honduras) Allan Lalín	(Honduras) Elder Vildad Valladares	(Honduras) Marlon José Peña
Universidad
(Honduras) Wilmer Daniel Ramos
Valencia
(Honduras) Marco Antonio Mejía	(Honduras) Ivis Palmer
Victoria
(Honduras) John Ashten Bodden	(Honduras) Jaime Rosales	(Honduras) Fabio Ulloa
(Brazil) Fabio de Souza	(Honduras) Ricardo Gabriel "Gato" Canales	(Argentina) Alejandro Naif
(Honduras) Héctor "Tanqueta" Flores
Vida
(Honduras) Eduardo "Balín" Bennet	(Honduras) Juan Carlos Raudales	(Honduras) Carlos Alberto Salinas

=== Awards ===
- Champion:
  Olimpia
  Awarded 360,000 Lempiras
- Sub Champion:
  Victoria
  Awarded 155,000 Lempiras
- Fair Play:
  Universidad
  Awarded 50,000 Lempiras
- Top Goal Scorer:
  Luciano Emilio
  Awarded 30,000 Lempiras
- Best Goalkeeper:
  Ricardo James
  Awarded 30,000 Lempiras
- Most Valuable Player:
  John Ashton Bodden
  Awarded 30,000 Lempiras
- Rookie of the year:
  José Luis Grant
  Awarded 30,000 Lempiras

=== Records ===
- Highest fee paid:
  Victoria-Olimpia
  28 May
  Estadio Tiburcio Carias Andino, Tegucigalpa
  31,951 fans
  2,997,750 lempiras
- Highest Assistance:
  Victoria-Olimpia
  28 May
  Estadio Tiburcio Carias Andino, Tegucigalpa
  31,951 fans
  2,997,750 lempiras
- Lowest fee paid:
  Universidad-Hispano
  26 April
  Danlí
  68 fans
  2,850 lempiras
- Lowest Assistance:
  Universidad-Hispano
  26 April
  68 fans
  2,850 lempiras

== Relegation ==
Pos	Team	Pld	W	D	L	GF	GA	GD	Pts	Qualification or relegation
1	Olimpia	36	21	11	4	65	30	+35	74	
2	Victoria	36	17	10	9	61	45	+16	61	
3	Municipal Valencia (Note: Valencia sold its franchise to Hispano for next season.)	36	14	8	14	35	35	0	50	
4	Platense	36	13	10	13	47	55	−8	49	
5	Real España	36	11	13	12	38	40	−2	46	
6	Vida	36	10	15	11	43	46	−3	45	
7	Motagua	36	11	10	15	34	36	−2	43	
8	Universidad	36	9	14	13	34	45	−11	41	
9	Marathón	36	9	13	14	46	53	−7	40	
10	Hispano (R)	36	7	12	17	38	52	−14	33	Relegation to Second division (Note: Hispano relegated to second division.)

Updated to match(es) played on 2006-05-07. Source:
(R) Relegated
