= 2000–01 Honduran Liga Nacional =

Liga Nacional
- Season: 2000–01
- Champions: Apertura: Olimpia; Clausura: Platense
- Relegated: Broncos
- Champions' Cup: Olimpia; Platense
- Matches: 205
- Goals: 514 (2.51 per match)
- Top goalscorer: Apertura: Marcelo Verón (13); Clausura: Pompilio Cacho (13)
- Biggest home win: Victoria 4–0 Broncos (8 November 2000); Platense 4–0 Universidad (15 December 2000); Deportes Savio 4–0 Vida (13 January 2001)
- Biggest away win: Broncos 0–6 Olimpia (18 October 2000)
- Highest scoring: Universidad 2–5 Olimpia (22 November 2000); Vida 3–4 Olimpia (25 March 2001)
- Longest unbeaten run: Olimpia (10)
- All statistics correct as of 22 July 2001.

The 2000–01 Honduran Liga Nacional was the 36th season in the history of the Honduran top division; this was the third tournament under the Apertura and Clausura format; C.D. Olimpia managed to beat C.D. Platense in the Apertura Final and obtained its 15th league title; in the Clausura C.D. Platense took revenge over C.D. Olimpia and won its 2nd title. The league games started 30 September 2000 and ended on 22 July 2001.

== 2000–01 teams ==
- Broncos (Choluteca)
- Deportes Savio (Santa Rosa de Copán) (promoted)
- Marathón (San Pedro Sula)
- Motagua (Tegucigalpa)
- Olimpia (Tegucigalpa)
- Platense (Puerto Cortés)
- Real España (San Pedro Sula)
- Universidad (Tegucigalpa)
- Victoria (La Ceiba)
- Vida (La Ceiba)

== Apertura ==
The Apertura tournament was the first half of the 2000–01 season in the Honduran football; Club Deportivo Olimpia set a record of 10 wins in a row, the first nine composed a whole round-robin. In the Final match Olimpia conquered its 15th title after defeating C.D. Platense 2–1 on aggregated score.

=== Regular season ===
==== Standings ====
Pos	Team	Pld	W	D	L	GF	GA	GD	Pts	Qualification or relegation
1	Olimpia	18	12	3	3	44	21	+23	39	Qualified to the Final round
2	Motagua	18	7	8	3	20	15	+5	29	Qualified to the Final round
3	Platense	18	7	7	4	30	21	+9	28	Qualified to the Final round
4	Real España	18	6	6	6	21	24	−3	24	Qualified to the Final round
5	Universidad	18	7	3	8	17	21	−4	24	Qualified to the Final round
6	Vida	18	6	5	7	22	24	−2	23	Qualified to the Final round
7	Victoria	18	5	6	7	25	24	+1	21	
8	Deportes Savio	18	5	6	7	24	24	0	21	
9	Marathón	18	4	6	8	20	25	−5	18	
10	Broncos	18	3	6	9	9	32	−23	15	

Updated to match(es) played on 13 January 2001. Source:

==== Results ====
As of 13 January 2001

Home \ Away	BRO	SAV	MAR	MOT	OLI	PLA	RES	UNI	VIC	VID
Broncos		0–0	1–0	2–1	0–6	2–0	0–2	0–0	1–1	0–3
Deportes Savio	0–0		0–1	2–2	1–2	3–2	1–0	1–2	2–2	4–0
Marathón	2–0	0–2		0–1	2–3	1–2	1–2	1–0	0–0	2–4
Motagua	1–1	1–0	1–1		1–0	1–1	0–0	0–1	3–1	1–0
Olimpia	1–1	2–2	4–2	2–1		3–1	3–0	1–2	2–1	4–1
Platense	4–1	2–2	2–2	1–1	0–0		1–1	4–0	2–1	0–0
Real España	2–0	2–1	2–2	1–1	2–1	1–2		0–1	2–1	2–2
Universidad	2–0	3–0	0–0	1–2	2–5	1–0	1–1		0–1	0–1
Victoria	4–0	2–1	2–3	1–1	1–2	1–3	3–1	2–0		1–1
Vida	3–0	1–2	0–0	0–1	1–3	0–3	3–0	2–1	0–0	

Source: Soccerway
Legend: Blue = home team win; Yellow = draw; Red = away team win.

=== Final round ===
==== Hexagonal ====
===== Olimpia vs Vida =====
25 January 2001 1st leg	Vida	1–1	Olimpia	La Ceiba, Atlántida
19:30 (UTC−06:00)	Goal	Report	Goal	Stadium: Estadio Nilmo Edwards

28 January 2001 2nd leg	Olimpia	1-0	Vida	Tegucigalpa, Francisco Morazán
16:00 (UTC−06:00)	Denilson Costa	Report	Goal	Stadium: Estadio Tiburcio Carías Andino

- Olimpia won 2–1 on aggregate score.

===== Motagua vs Universidad =====
24 January 2001 1st leg	Universidad	2–1	Motagua	Tegucigalpa, Francisco Morazán
19:30 (UTC−06:00)	Francis Reyes, Juan Rosa Lagos	Report	Francisco Ramirez	Stadium: Estadio Tiburcio Carías Andino

27 January 2001 2nd leg	Motagua	1 - 1	Universidad	Tegucigalpa, Francisco Morazán
19:30 (UTC−06:00)	Francisco Ramirez	Report	Juan Rosa Lagos	Stadium: Estadio Tiburcio Carías Andino

- Universidad won 3–2 on aggregate score.

===== Platense vs Real España =====
25 January 2001 1st leg	Real España	2–2	Platense	San Pedro Sula, Cortés
19:30 (UTC−06:00)	Goal		Mejía	Stadium: Estadio Olímpico Metropolitano

28 January 2001 2nd leg	Platense	1–0	Real España	Puerto Cortés, Cortés
15:00 (UTC−06:00)	Goal			Stadium: Estadio Excélsior

- Platense 3–2 Real España; Platense advances on better Regular season performance. Real España advances as best losers.

==== Semifinals ====
===== Olimpia vs Real España =====
31 January 2001 1st leg	Real España	0–0	Olimpia	San Pedro Sula, Cortés
19:30 (UTC−06:00)				Stadium: Estadio Olímpico Metropolitano

4 February 2001 2nd leg	Olimpia	2–0	Real España	Tegucigalpa, Francisco Morazán
16:00 (UTC−06:00)	Paez; Tosello	Report		Stadium: Estadio Tiburcio Carías Andino

- Olimpia won 2–0 on aggregate score.

===== Platense vs Universidad =====
1 February 2001 1st leg	Universidad	1–3	Platense	Tegucigalpa, Francisco Morazán
19:30 (UTC−06:00)	Reyes 21'		Álvarez 62' de León 67'; Pacini 72'	Stadium: Estadio Tiburcio Carías Andino

3 February 2001 2nd leg	Platense	0–1	Universidad	Puerto Cortés, Cortés
19:30 (UTC−06:00)		Report	Rodríguez	Stadium: Estadio Excélsior; Referee: Argelio Sabillón

- Platense won 3–2 on aggregate score.

==== Final ====
===== Olimpia vs Platense =====
7 February 2001 1st leg	Platense	1–1	Olimpia	Puerto Cortés, Cortés
19:30 (UTC−06:00)	Goal		Pineda 85'	Stadium: Estadio Excélsior

11 February 2001 2nd leg	Olimpia	1–1 (4-1) (a.e.t.)	Platense	Tegucigalpa, Francisco Morazán
16:00 (UTC−06:00)	Tosello 115' (pen.)		Morales 104'	Stadium: Estadio Tiburcio Carías Andino; Attendance: 35,067; Referee: Vivian Rodríguez

Liga Nacional
2000–01 Apertura champion

15th title

=== Top goalscorers ===
13 goals

- (Argentina) Marcelo Verón (Platense)

8 goals

- (Brazil) Denilson Costa (Olimpia)

6 goals

- (Argentina) José Pacini (Platense)
- (Argentina) Danilo Tosello (Olimpia)

1 goal

- (Honduras) Saúl Martínez (Olimpia)

== Clausura ==
In the Clausura tournament of the 2000–01 season; C.D. Platense took revenge on C.D. Olimpia and achieved its second championship in its history. On the other hand, C.D. Broncos although they finished fifth in the Regular season, they were not allow to participate in the Hexagonal, due to their condition of relegated team; C.D. Motagua replaced them instead.

=== Regular season ===
==== Standings ====
Pos	Team	Pld	W	D	L	GF	GA	GD	Pts	Qualification or relegation
1	Olimpia	18	13	3	2	34	11	+23	42	Qualified to the Final round
2	Platense	18	11	4	3	26	13	+13	37	Qualified to the Final round
3	Marathón	18	9	3	6	30	20	+10	30	Qualified to the Final round
4	Real España	18	6	4	8	27	29	−2	22	Qualified to the Final round
5	Broncos	18	5	6	7	19	24	−5	21	Relegated, could not qualify
6	Victoria	18	4	8	6	24	28	−4	20	Qualified to the Final round
7	Motagua	18	2	12	4	23	27	−4	18	Replaced Broncos
8	Universidad	18	4	6	8	15	21	−6	18	
9	Vida	18	4	6	8	22	31	−9	18	
10	Deportes Savio	18	3	6	9	14	30	−16	15	

Updated to match(es) played on 17 June 2001. Source:

==== Results ====
As of 17 June 2001

Home \ Away	BRO	SAV	MAR	MOT	OLI	PLA	RES	UNI	VIC	VID
Broncos		4–1	0–0	0–0	0–4	0–1	2–1	1–0	1–1	3–1
Deportes Savio	1–1		1–4	1–1	0–3	0–0	0–1	1–1	0–3	2–1
Marathón	2–1	0–1		3–1	3–1	1–2	3–1	2–0	3–1	4–2
Motagua	2–2	2–2	1–3		0–1	1–1	2–2	1–1	3–3	2–0
Olimpia	1–0	1–0	2–0	1–1		0–0	3–0	2–0	1–2	2–0
Platense	3–0	2–0	1–0	2–0	0–2		2–0	0–3	4–1	2–0
Real España	1–2	3–0	2–2	3–3	0–2	1–2		3–1	4–2	1–1
Universidad	1–0	1–0	1–1	1–1	0–2	1–1	1–2		1–0	1–2
Victoria	1–1	2–2	1–1	1–2	2–2	0–1	1–0	1–0		1–1
Vida	3–1	0–2	1–0	0–0	3–4	3–2	2–2	1–1	1–1	

Source: Soccerway
Legend: Blue = home team win; Yellow = draw; Red = away team win.

=== Final round ===
==== Hexagonal ====
===== Olimpia vs Motagua =====
4 July 2001 1st leg	Motagua	1–2	Olimpia	Tegucigalpa, Francisco Morazán
19:30 (UTC−06:00)	Martínez		Costa; Fuentes	Stadium: Estadio Tiburcio Carías Andino

8 July 2001 2nd leg	Olimpia	1–1	Motagua	Tegucigalpa, Francisco Morazán
16:00 (UTC−06:00)	Tosello		Nolasco	Stadium: Estadio Tiburcio Carías Andino

- Olimpia won 3–2 on aggregate score.

===== Platense vs Victoria =====
4 July 2001 1st leg	Victoria	1–1	Platense	La Ceiba, Atlántida
19:30 (UTC−06:00)	Martínez		Pacini	Stadium: Estadio Nilmo Edwards

8 July 2001 2nd leg	Platense	2–1	Victoria	Puerto Cortés, Cortés
15:00 (UTC−06:00)	López 24'; Álvarez		Puerto	Stadium: Estadio Excélsior; Referee: Evaristo Soriano

- Platense won 3–2 on aggregate score.

===== Marathón vs Real España =====
4 July 2001 1st leg	Real España	1–1	Marathón	San Pedro Sula, Cortés
19:30 (UTC−06:00)	López		Fenández	Stadium: Estadio Francisco Morazán

8 July 2001 2nd leg	Marathón	0–0	Real España	San Pedro Sula, Cortés
15:00 (UTC−06:00)				Stadium: Estadio Olímpico Metropolitano

- Marathón 1–1 Real España on aggregate score; Marathón advanced on better Regular season performance; Real España advanced as best loser

==== Semifinals ====
===== Olimpia vs Real España =====
11 July 2001 1st leg	Real España	0–0	Olimpia	San Pedro Sula, Cortés
19:30 (UTC−06:00)				Stadium: Estadio Olímpico Metropolitano

15 July 2001 2nd leg	Olimpia	1–1	Real España	Tegucigalpa, Francisco Morazán
16:00 (UTC−06:00)	Costa		Hernández	Stadium: Estadio Tiburcio Carías Andino

- Olimpia 1–1 Real España on aggregate score; Olimpia advanced on better Regular season record.

===== Platense vs Marathón =====
12 July 2001 1st leg	Marathón	3–1	Platense	San Pedro Sula, Cortés
19:30 (UTC−06:00)	Cacho; González; Pacheco		Verón	Stadium: Estadio Francisco Morazán

15 July 2001 2nd leg	Platense	3–0	Marathón	Puerto Cortés, Cortés
15:00 (UTC−06:00)	Verón; Pérez; Álvarez			Stadium: Estadio Excélsior; Referee: José Pineda

- Platense won 4–3 on aggregate score.

==== Final ====
===== Olimpia vs Platense =====
19 July 2001 1st leg	Platense	1–0	Olimpia	Puerto Cortés, Cortés
19:30 (UTC−06:00)	Verón 90'			Stadium: Estadio Excélsior; Referee: Argelio Sabillón

Platense	Olimpia

GK	–	(Honduras) Víctor Coello
RB	10	(Honduras) Edgar Álvarez
CB	4	(Panama) José Anthony Torres
CB	3	(Honduras) Ángel Hill
LB	7	(Honduras) Rony Morales
CM	–	(Honduras) Marco Mejía
CM	–	(Honduras) Walter Hernández	Substituted off
CM	–	(Honduras) Fabricio Pérez
LF	11	(Honduras) Clifford Laing	Substituted off
CF	29	(Argentina) Marcelo Verón
RF	8	(Argentina) José Pacini	Substituted off
Substitutions:
CM	–	(Honduras) Edgar Sierra	Substituted on
CB	–	(Honduras) Derrick Hulse	Substituted on
Manager:
(Argentina) Alberto Romero

GK	27	(Panama) Donaldo González
RB	3	(Honduras) Gerson Vásquez
CB	6	(Honduras) Fabio Ulloa
CB	15	(Uruguay) Robert Lima
LB	–	(Honduras) Arnold Cruz
DM	5	(Honduras) Merlyn Membreño
CM	8	(Honduras) José Luis Pineda
CM	–	(Honduras) Christian Santamaría
AM	18	(Argentina) Danilo Tosello
CF	19	(Brazil) Denilson Costa		Substituted off
CF	24	(Brazil) Marcelo Ferreira
CF	22	(Argentina) Gustavo Fuentes	Substituted off
Substitutions:
ST	25	(Honduras) Elvis Scott		Substituted on
CM	–	(Honduras) Elmer Marín		Substituted on
Manager:
(Honduras) Edwin Pavón

22 July 2001 2nd leg	Olimpia	1–1 (a.e.t.)	Platense	Tegucigalpa, Francisco Morazán
16:00 (UTC−06:00)	Tosello 10'		Morales 92'	Stadium: Estadio Tiburcio Carías Andino; Referee: José Pineda

Olimpia	Platense

GK	27	(Panama) Donaldo González
RB	3	(Honduras) Gerson Vásquez
CB	15	(Uruguay) Robert Lima
CB	6	(Honduras) Fabio Ulloa
LB	5	(Honduras) Merlyn Membreño
CM	8	(Honduras) José Pineda
CM	–	(Honduras) Elmer Marín
CM	–	(Honduras) Christian Santamaría
AM	18	(Argentina) Danilo Tosello
CF	19	(Brazil) Denilson Costa
CF	25	(Honduras) Elvis Scott
CF	23	(Argentina) Gustavo Fuentes
Substitutions:
–	–	–
–	–	–
–	–	–
Manager:
(Honduras) Edwin Pavón

GK	1	(Panama) Ricardo James
RB	10	(Honduras) Edgar Álvarez
CB	4	(Panama) José Torres
CB	–	(Honduras) Mario Beata
LB	–	(Honduras) Rony Morales
CM	–	(Honduras) Marco Mejía
CM	–	(Honduras) Walter Hernández
RM	–	(Honduras) Fabricio Pérez
LM	–	(Honduras) Óscar Bonilla
RS	29	(Argentina) Marcelo Verón
LS	8	(Argentina) José Pacini
Substitutions:
CB	–	(Honduras) Ángel Hill	Substituted on
RW	11	(Honduras) Clifford Laing	Substituted on
Manager:
(Argentina) Alberto Romero

Liga Nacional
2000–01 Clausura champion

2nd title

=== Top goalscorers ===
13 goals

- (Honduras) Pompilio Cacho (Marathón)

10 goals

- (Argentina) Marcelo Verón (Platense)

8 goals

- (Argentina) José Pacini (Platense)
- (Honduras) Saúl Martínez (Motagua)

7 goals

- (Argentina) Danilo Tosello (Olimpia)

5 goals

- (Brazil) Denilson Costa (Olimpia)

2 goals

- (Honduras) Julio de León (Olimpia)
- (Honduras) Narciso Fernández (Marathón)

== Relegation ==
Relegation was determined by the aggregated table of both Apertura and Clausura tournaments.

Pos	Team	Pld	W	D	L	GF	GA	GD	Pts	Qualification or relegation
1	Olimpia	36	25	6	5	78	32	+46	81	Qualified to the 2001 CONCACAF Champions' Cup (Note: Olimpia and Platense qualified to the 2001 CONCACAF Champions' Cup as winners of Apertura and Clausura respectively; eventually the CONCACAF scrapped the 2001 season.)
2	Platense	36	18	11	7	56	34	+22	65	Qualified to the 2001 CONCACAF Champions' Cup
3	Marathón	36	13	9	14	50	45	+5	48	
4	Motagua	36	9	20	7	43	42	+1	47	
5	Real España	36	12	10	14	48	53	−5	46	
6	Universidad	36	11	9	16	32	42	−10	42	
7	Victoria	36	9	14	13	49	52	−3	41	
8	Vida	36	10	11	15	44	55	−11	41	
9	Deportes Savio	36	8	12	16	38	54	−16	36	Forced to a Relegation playoff
10	Broncos	36	8	12	16	28	56	−28	36	Forced to a Relegation playoff

Updated to match(es) played on 17 June 2001. Source:

=== Relegation playoff ===
21 June 2001 Relegation playoff	Broncos	1–1 (a.e.t.) (3–4 p)	Deportes Savio	San Pedro Sula, Cortés
19:30 (UTC−06:00)				Stadium: Estadio Olímpico Metropolitano; Referee: Marcio Carranza

- Deportes Savio won Relegation playoff 4–3 on penalty shootouts; Broncos were relegated to the 2001–02 Segunda División.
