= 2003–04 Honduran Liga Nacional =

Liga Nacional
- Season: 2003–04
- Champions: Apertura: Real España; Clausura: Olimpia
- Relegated: Real Patepluma
- UNCAF Interclub Cup: Real España; Olimpia
- Top goalscorer: Apertura: (Argentina) Danilo Tosello (13); Clausura: (Brazil) Luciano Emílio (10)
- All statistics correct as of 30 May 2004.

The 2003–04 Honduran Liga Nacional was the 36th edition of the Honduran Liga Nacional. The season was divided into two tournaments, Apertura and Clausura, being conquered by Real C.D. España and Club Deportivo Olimpia respectively.

== 2003–04 teams ==
- Atlético Olanchano (Catacamas) promoted
- Marathón (San Pedro Sula)
- Motagua (Tegucigalpa)
- Olimpia (Tegucigalpa)
- Platense (Puerto Cortés)
- Real España (San Pedro Sula)
- Real Patepluma (Santa Bárbara)
- Universidad (Tegucigalpa)
- Victoria (La Ceiba)
- Vida (La Ceiba)

== Apertura ==
The Apertura tournament was played from August to December 2003; Club Deportivo Olimpia and Real C.D. España qualified to the Final after they eliminated C.D. Marathón and C.D.S. Vida in the semifinals; once there, Real España obtained its 8th title under the management of Juan de Dios Castillo.

=== Regular season ===
==== Results ====
| Home \ Away | OLA | MAR | MOT | OLI | PLA | RES | PAT | UNI | VIC | VID |
|---|---|---|---|---|---|---|---|---|---|---|
| Atlético Olanchano | | 0–1 | 2–0 | 0–2 | 2–2 | 2–5 | 1–1 | 1–2 | 2–2 | 2–1 |
| Marathón | 4–0 | | 0–1 | 0–2 | 1–1 | 1–2 | 4–1 | 2–1 | 2–2 | 1–0 |
| Motagua | 1–0 | 0–1 | | 1–2 | 2–2 | 4–2 | 0–1 | 1–1 | 2–0 | 2–1 |
| Olimpia | 0–0 | 2–0 | 2–0 | | 3–1 | 0–0 | 5–0 | 2–0 | 1–0 | 4–0 |
| Platense | 1–1 | 1–0 | 2–0 | 0–0 | | 0–4 | 3–1 | 4–1 | 2–1 | 0–1 |
| Real España | 3–2 | 1–1 | 2–1 | 1–4 | 1–0 | | 2–2 | 3–0 | 4–0 | 1–3 |
| Real Patepluma | 1–4 | 0–1 | 1–3 | 0–6 | 0–0 | 0–1 | | 0–0 | 1–2 | 3–2 |
| Universidad | 2–0 | 0–0 | 0–2 | 1–0 | 0–0 | 1–1 | 2–1 | | 0–0 | 1–1 |
| Victoria | 0–0 | 0–2 | 2–2 | 2–4 | 3–1 | 0–1 | 3–1 | 2–2 | | 0–2 |
| Vida | 3–1 | 2–0 | 1–0 | 1–1 | 2–1 | 2–2 | 2–1 | 0–0 | 0–0 | |

Source: RSSSF
Legend: Blue = home team win; Yellow = draw; Red = away team win.

==== Standings ====
| Pos | Team | Pld | W | D | L | GF | GA | GD | Pts | Qualification or relegation |
|---|---|---|---|---|---|---|---|---|---|---|
| 1 | Olimpia | 18 | 13 | 4 | 1 | 40 | 7 | +33 | 43 | Qualified to the Final round |
| 2 | Real España | 18 | 10 | 5 | 3 | 36 | 23 | +13 | 35 | Qualified to the Final round |
| 3 | Vida | 18 | 8 | 5 | 5 | 23 | 20 | +3 | 29 | Qualified to the Final round |
| 4 | Marathón | 18 | 8 | 4 | 6 | 21 | 16 | +5 | 28 | Qualified to the Final round |
| 5 | Motagua | 18 | 7 | 3 | 8 | 22 | 22 | 0 | 24 | |
| 6 | Platense | 18 | 5 | 7 | 6 | 20 | 23 | −3 | 22 | |
| 7 | Universidad | 18 | 4 | 9 | 5 | 14 | 20 | −6 | 21 | |
| 8 | Victoria | 18 | 3 | 7 | 8 | 19 | 29 | −10 | 16 | |
| 9 | Atlético Olanchano | 18 | 3 | 6 | 9 | 20 | 31 | −11 | 15 | |
| 10 | Real Patepluma | 18 | 2 | 4 | 12 | 15 | 40 | −25 | 10 | |

Updated to match(es) played on 1 December 2003. Source:

=== Final round ===
==== Semifinals ====
===== Olimpia vs Marathón =====
| 4 December 2003 1st leg | Marathón | 2–2 | Olimpia | San Pedro Sula, Cortés |
| 19:30 (UTC−06:00) | Fernández 12'; Pacini 48' | | Palacios 5'; Tosello 13' | Stadium: Estadio Olímpico Metropolitano |

| 7 December 2003 2nd leg | Olimpia | 3–1 | Marathón | Tegucigalpa, Francisco Morazán |
| 16:00 (UTC−06:00) | Ferreira 34'; M. Palacios 48'; Palacios 72' | | Pacini 29' | Stadium: Estadio Tiburcio Carías Andino |

- Olimpia won 5–3 on aggregate score.

===== Real España vs Vida =====
| 4 December 2003 1st leg | Vida | 3–1 | Real España | La Ceiba, Atlántida |
| 19:30 (UTC−06:00) | Paradiso 16'; Brooks 58'; Arzú 77' | | Pavón 83' | Stadium: Estadio Nilmo Edwards |

| 7 December 2003 2nd leg | Real España | 3–0 | Vida | San Pedro Sula, Cortés |
| 16:00 (UTC−06:00) | Emílio 33'; Oliva 44'; Pavón 72' | | | Stadium: Estadio Olímpico Metropolitano |

- Real España won 4–3 on aggregate score.

==== Final ====
===== Olimpia vs Real España =====
| 14 December 2003 1st leg | Real España | 2–2 | Olimpia | San Pedro Sula, Cortés |
| 16:00 (UTC−06:00) | Emílio 38' 83' | | Cárcamo 27'; Tosello 77' (pen.) | Stadium: Estadio Francisco Morazán; Attendance: Marcio Carranza |

| 21 December 2003 2nd leg | Olimpia | 0–2 | Real España | Tegucigalpa, Francisco Morazán |
| 16:00 (UTC−06:00) | | | Santana 81'; Emílio 90' | Stadium: Estadio Tiburcio Carías Andino; Attendance: 34,515; Referee: Benigno Pineda |

| Olimpia | Real España |

| GK | – | (Panama) Donaldo González |
| RB | – | (Honduras) Wilson Palacios |
| CB | – | (Honduras) Milton Palacios |
| SW | – | (Honduras) Rony Morales |
| LB | – | (Honduras) Maynor Figueroa |
| CM | – | (Honduras) Óscar Bonilla |
| CM | 8 | (Honduras) José Luis Pineda |
| CM | – | (Honduras) Elmer Marín |
| AM | 18 | (Argentina) Danilo Tosello | Substituted off |
| CF | 9 | (Honduras) Juan Manuel Cárcamo | (substituted off) 80' |
| CF | 19 | (Brazil) Marcelo Ferreira | (substituted off) 61' |
Substitutions:
| MF | – | (Honduras) Reynaldo Tilguath | Substituted in |
| FW | 11 | (Honduras) Wilmer Velásquez | (substituted in) 61' |
| FW | – | (Honduras) Jerry Palacios | (substituted in) 80' |
Manager:
(Honduras) José Herrera

| GK | – | (Honduras) Júnior Morales |
| RB | – | (Honduras) Sergio Mendoza |
| CB | – | (Panama) José Anthony Torres |
| CB | – | (Honduras) Erick Vallecillo |
| LB | – | (Honduras) Antonio Arita |
| CM | – | (Honduras) Leonardo Isaula |
| CM | – | (Honduras) Elkin González |
| RM | – | (Honduras) Carlos Oliva | (substituted off) 68' |
| LM | – | (Brazil) Pedro Santana |
| CF | 20 | (Honduras) Carlos Pavón |
| CF | 9 | (Brazil) Luciano Emílio |
Substitutions:
| MF | – | (Honduras) Mario Chirinos | (substituted in) 68' |
Manager:
(Mexico) Juan de Dios Castillo

- Real España won 4–2 on aggregate score.

Liga Nacional
2003–04 Apertura champion
Real España
8th title

=== Top goalscorers ===
13 goals

- (Argentina) Danilo Tosello (Olimpia)

12 goals

- (Brazil) Luciano Emílio (Real España)

10 goals

- (Honduras) Carlos Pavón (Real España)

9 goals

- (Brazil) Denilson Costa (Marathón)

8 goals

- (Argentina) José Pacini (Marathón)
- (Brazil) Pedrinho (Real España)

== Clausura ==
On the Clausura tournament, C.D. Olimpia won its 17th domestic league by beating C.D. Marathón in the finals; Real Patepluma withdrew before the start of the regular season and were mathematically relegated to the Liga de Ascenso.

=== Regular season ===
==== Results ====
| Home \ Away | OLA | MAR | MOT | OLI | PLA | RES | UNI | VIC | VID |
|---|---|---|---|---|---|---|---|---|---|
| Atlético Olanchano | | 2–2 | 1–1 | 0–3 | 2–0 | 3–1 | 2–1 | 2–4 | 1–2 |
| Marathón | 2–1 | | 3–1 | 2–1 | 0–1 | 1–0 | 4–0 | 0–0 | 3–0 |
| Motagua | 2–1 | 1–0 | | 2–2 | 1–0 | 2–1 | 0–1 | 1–2 | 1–1 |
| Olimpia | 2–0 | 2–1 | 0–0 | | 2–0 | 2–1 | 0–0 | 4–0 | 1–1 |
| Platense | 2–2 | 1–1 | 2–3 | 1–2 | | 1–4 | 1–0 | 0–2 | 2–0 |
| Real España | 1–1 | 2–1 | 3–2 | 3–4 | 3–2 | | 2–1 | 2–1 | 3–0 |
| Universidad | 2–0 | 0–0 | 0–3 | 0–2 | 0–2 | 0–0 | | 2–1 | 0–0 |
| Victoria | 3–1 | 1–0 | 3–2 | 2–3 | 0–1 | 3–1 | 1–0 | | 2–0 |
| Vida | 2–2 | 1–2 | 0–0 | 2–3 | 0–2 | 1–1 | 2–1 | 1–1 | |

Source: RSSSF
Legend: Blue = home team win; Yellow = draw; Red = away team win.

==== Standings ====
| Pos | Team | Pld | W | D | L | GF | GA | GD | Pts | Qualification or relegation |
|---|---|---|---|---|---|---|---|---|---|---|
| 1 | Olimpia | 16 | 11 | 4 | 1 | 33 | 15 | +18 | 37 | Qualified to the Final round |
| 2 | Victoria | 16 | 9 | 2 | 5 | 26 | 20 | +6 | 29 | Qualified to the Final round |
| 3 | Marathón | 16 | 7 | 4 | 5 | 22 | 14 | +8 | 25 | Qualified to the Final round |
| 4 | Real España | 16 | 7 | 3 | 6 | 28 | 25 | +3 | 24 | Qualified to the Final round |
| 5 | Motagua | 16 | 6 | 5 | 5 | 22 | 20 | +2 | 23 | |
| 6 | Platense | 16 | 6 | 2 | 8 | 18 | 22 | −4 | 20 | |
| 7 | Atlético Olanchano | 16 | 3 | 5 | 8 | 21 | 30 | −9 | 14 | |
| 8 | Vida | 16 | 2 | 7 | 7 | 13 | 25 | −12 | 13 | |
| 9 | Universidad | 16 | 3 | 4 | 9 | 8 | 20 | −12 | 13 (Note: Universidad made only 8 goals during the Clausura tournament, a record in Liga Nacional.) | |

Updated to match(es) played on 8 May 2004. Source:

=== Final round ===
==== Semifinals ====
===== Olimpia vs Real España =====
| 13 May 2004 1st leg | Real España | 1–4 | Olimpia | San Pedro Sula, Cortés |
| 19:30 (UTC−06:00) | Emílio | | Cárcamo; Velásquez | Stadium: Estadio Olímpico Metropolitano |

| 16 May 2004 2nd leg | Olimpia | 1–1 | Real España | Tegucigalpa, Francisco Morazán |
| 16:00 (UTC−06:00) | Cárcamo | | Hernández | Stadium: Estadio Tiburcio Carías Andino |

- Olimpia won 5–2 on aggregate score.

===== Victoria vs Marathón =====
| 12 May 2004 1st leg | Marathón | 2–1 | Victoria | San Pedro Sula, Cortés |
| 19:30 (UTC−06:00) | Simovic; Martínez | | H. Flores | Stadium: Estadio Olímpico Metropolitano |

| 15 May 2004 2nd leg | Victoria | 1–2 | Marathón | La Ceiba, Atlántida |
| 19:30 (UTC−06:00) | Flores | | C. Santamaría; Costa | Stadium: Estadio Nilmo Edwards |

- Marathón won 4–2 on aggregate score.

==== Final ====
===== Olimpia vs Marathón =====
| 22 May 2004 1st leg | Marathón | 1–1 | Olimpia | San Pedro Sula, Cortés |
| 19:30 (UTC−06:00) | Martínez 70' | | Cárcamo 65' | Stadium: Estadio Olímpico Metropolitano |

| 30 May 2004 2nd leg | Olimpia | 1–0 | Marathón | Tegucigalpa, Francisco Morazán |
| 16:00 (UTC−06:00) | Tosello 32' | | | Stadium: Estadio Tiburcio Carías Andino; Attendance: 30,254; Referee: Benigno Pineda |

| Olimpia | Marathón |

| GK | – | (Panama) Donaldo González |
| RB | – | (Honduras) Óscar Bonilla |
| RB | – | (Honduras) Mario Beata |
| CB | – | (Honduras) Rony Morales |
| CB | – | (Honduras) Elmer Marin |
| LB | – | (Honduras) Maynor Figueroa |
| CM | – | (Honduras) Wilson Palacios |
| AM | 18 | (Argentina) Danilo Tosello |
| AM | – | (Honduras) Juan Manuel Carcamo |
| CF | 11 | (Honduras) Wilmer Velásquez |
| CF | – | (Honduras) Jerry Palacios |
Substitutions:
Manager:
(Honduras) José de la Paz Herrera

| GK | 1 | (Honduras) Víctor Coello |
| RB | 23 | (Honduras) Mauricio Sabillón |
| CB | 4 | (Panama) Anthony Torres |
| CB | 5 | (Honduras) Darwin Pacheco |
| LB | 3 | (Honduras) Behiker Bustillo |
| DM | 13 | (Honduras) Dennis Ferrera |
| CM | 24 | (Honduras) Luis Guifarro |
| CM | 19 | (Honduras) Mario Berríos |
| AM | 7 | (Honduras) Emil Martínez |
| CF | 17 | (Uruguay) Edgardo Simovic | (substituted off) 59' |
| CF | 9 | (Honduras) Cristian Martínez |
Substitutions:
| FW | – | (Honduras) Walter Martínez | (substituted in) 59' |
Manager:
(Mexico) Alfonso Rendón

- Olimpia won 2–1 on aggregate score.

Liga Nacional
2003–04 Clausura champion
Olimpia
17th title

=== Top goalscorers ===
10 goals

- (Brazil) Luciano Emílio (Real España)

== Relegation ==
Relegation was determined by the aggregated table of both Apertura and Clausura tournaments, the teams with less points at the end would be relegated to the Liga de Ascenso; however, Real Patepluma withdrew from the Clausura tournament due to a financial crisis and were automatically relegated.

| Pos | Team | Pld | W | D | L | GF | GA | GD | Pts | Qualification or relegation |
|---|---|---|---|---|---|---|---|---|---|---|
| 1 | Olimpia | 34 | 24 | 8 | 2 | 73 | 22 | +51 | 80 | Qualified to the 2004 Copa Interclubes UNCAF (Note: Real España and Olimpia qualified to the 2004 Copa Interclubes UNCAF as champions of Apertura and Clausura respectively.) |
| 2 | Real España | 34 | 17 | 8 | 9 | 64 | 48 | +16 | 59 | Qualified to the 2004 Copa Interclubes UNCAF |
| 3 | Marathón | 34 | 15 | 8 | 11 | 43 | 30 | +13 | 53 | |
| 4 | Motagua | 34 | 13 | 8 | 13 | 44 | 42 | +2 | 47 | |
| 5 | Victoria | 34 | 12 | 9 | 13 | 45 | 49 | −4 | 45 | |
| 6 | Platense | 34 | 11 | 9 | 14 | 38 | 45 | −7 | 42 | |
| 7 | Vida | 34 | 10 | 12 | 12 | 35 | 44 | −9 | 42 | |
| 8 | Universidad | 34 | 7 | 13 | 14 | 22 | 40 | −18 | 34 | |
| 9 | Atlético Olanchano | 34 | 6 | 11 | 17 | 41 | 61 | −20 | 29 | |
| 10 | Real Patepluma | 18 | 2 | 4 | 12 | 15 | 40 | −25 | 10 | Relegation to the 2004–05 Liga de Ascenso |

Updated to match(es) played on 8 May 2004. Source:
