= 2004–05 Honduran Liga Nacional =

Liga Nacional
- Season: 2004–05
- Champions: Apertura: C.D. Marathón; Clausura: C.D. Olimpia
- Relegated: Atlético Olanchano
- UNCAF Interclub Cup: C.D. Marathón; C.D. Olimpia
- Top goalscorer: Apertura: (Brazil) Luciano Emílio (16); Clausura: (Honduras) Francisco Ramírez (10)

The 2004–05 Honduran Liga Nacional was the 40th season in the Honduran football top division; it determined the 46th and 47th national champions in the league's history.

== 2004–05 teams ==
Location of teams in 2004–05 season
- Atlético Olanchano (Catacamas)
- Marathón (San Pedro Sula)
- Motagua (Tegucigalpa)
- Olimpia (Tegucigalpa)
- Platense (Puerto Cortes)
- Real España (San Pedro Sula)
- Universidad (Danlí)
- Municipal Valencia (Choluteca)
- Victoria (La Ceiba)
- Vida (La Ceiba)
- Note: Both Universidad and Valencia are from Tegucigalpa but had to play their home matches at Danlí and Choluteca respectively.

== Apertura ==
=== Regular season ===
==== Standings ====
Pos	Team	Pld	W	D	L	GF	GA	GD	Pts	Qualification or relegation
1	Olimpia	18	12	3	3	39	17	+22	39	Qualification to the Final round
2	Marathón	18	10	4	4	23	17	+6	34	Qualification to the Final round
3	Real España	18	9	4	5	23	12	+11	31	Qualification to the Final round
4	Victoria	18	8	7	3	32	26	+6	31	Qualification to the Final round
5	Vida	18	6	4	8	20	23	−3	22	
6	Platense	18	6	3	9	21	28	−7	21	
7	Atletico Olanchano	18	4	8	6	23	27	−4	20	
8	Municipal Valencia	18	4	7	7	17	25	−8	19	
9	Motagua	18	4	6	8	20	25	−5	18	
10	Universidad	18	2	4	12	12	30	−18	10	

Updated to match(es) played on 14 November 2004. Source:

==== Results table ====
Home \ Away	OLA	MAR	MOT	OLI	PLA	RES	UNI	VAL	VIC	VID
Atlético Olanchano		2–2	2–2	2–3	0–1	1–0	1–0	4–2	2–2	2–1
Marathón	3–1		0–0	1–0	2–1	2–0	0–2	2–0	2–1	1–0
Motagua	2–1	1–1		0–1	2–0	0–1	2–0	1–1	3–4	1–2
Olimpia	3–0	3–0	3–1		2–1	0–1	1–0	1–1	5–2	3–1
Platense	1–1	1–2	2–0	0–3		2–1	2–0	3–0	0–1	2–1
Real España	2–1	2–0	2–0	0–0	5–0		3–0	2–1	2–2	0–1
Universidad	1–1	0–0	1–3	0–5	1–1	0–1		1–2	0–2	3–1
Municipal Valencia	0–0	1–0	1–1	2–4	2–0	1–1	0–0		0–0	1–0
Victoria	1–1	2–3	2–0	1–1	4–4	1–0	2–1	3–1		1–0
Vida	1–1	0–2	1–1	4–1	1–0	0–0	3–2	2–1	1–1	

Source: RSSSF.com–Honduras 2004/05
Legend: Blue = home team win; Yellow = draw; Red = away team win.

=== Final round ===
==== Semifinals ====
===== Olimpia vs Victoria =====
24 November 2004 1st leg	Victoria	3–6	Olimpia	La Ceiba, Atlántida
19:30 (UTC−06:00)	Ramírez 25' 47' 90+1'		Emílio 6' 44' 89'; Velásquez 28' 39'; Palacios 70'	Stadium: Estadio Nilmo Edwards; Attendance: 7,346

27 November 2004 2nd leg	Olimpia	5–0	Victoria	Tegucigalpa, Francisco Morazán
19:30 (UTC−06:00)	Morales 32'; Emílio 45'; Velásquez 46'; J. Luis Pineda			Stadium: Estadio Tiburcio Carías Andino; Referee: Marcio Carranza

- Olimpia won 11–3 on aggregate score.

===== Marathón vs Real España =====
25 November 2004 1st leg	Real España	1–2	Marathón	San Pedro Sula, Cortés
19:30 (UTC−06:00)	Santana 40'		Simovic 78'; Berríos 89'	Stadium: Estadio Olímpico Metropolitano

28 November 2004 2nd leg	Marathón	1–1	Real España	San Pedro Sula, Cortés
(UTC−06:00)	Núñez 83'		Santana 30'	Stadium: Estadio Olímpico Metropolitano

- Marathón won 3–2 on aggregate score.

==== Final ====
===== Olimpia vs Marathón =====
12 December 2004 1st leg	Marathón	3–2	Olimpia	San Pedro Sula, Cortés
(UTC−06:00)	Pacheco 18'; Simovic 25'; Núñez 75'		Tosello 24'; Emílio 42'	Stadium: Estadio Olímpico Metropolitano; Attendance: 13,000

Marathón	Olimpia

GK	1	(Honduras) Víctor Coello
RB	23	(Honduras) Mauricio Sabillón
CB	4	(Panama) Anthony Torres	Booked
CB	5	(Honduras) Darwin Pacheco
LB	3	(Honduras) Behiker Bustillo	Booked
DM	13	(Honduras) Dennis Ferrera
RM	18	(Argentina) Pablo Genovese
LM	20	(Honduras) Narciso Fernández
AM	8	(Argentina) Juan Yalet	(substituted off) 71'
CF	17	(Uruguay) Edgardo Simovic	(substituted off) 86'
CF	10	(Brazil) Denilson Costa	(substituted off) 61'
Substitutions:
FW	11	(Honduras) Milton Núñez	(substituted in) 61'
FW	15	(Honduras) Walter Martínez	(substituted in) 71'
FW	27	(Honduras) Óscar Vargas	(substituted in) 86'
Manager:
(Honduras) Nicolás Suazo

GK	–	(Panama) Ricardo James
RB	–	(Honduras) Wilson Palacios	Booked
CB	–	(Honduras) Fabio Ulloa	Booked
CB	–	(Honduras) Mario Beata
LB	6	(Honduras) Maynor Figueroa
CM	–	(Honduras) Óscar Bonilla
CM	–	(Honduras) Elmer Marín
AM	18	(Argentina) Danilo Tosello	(substituted off) 55'
RF	9	(Honduras) Juan Manuel Cárcamo
CF	11	(Honduras) Wilmer Velásquez	(substituted off) 78'
LF	21	(Brazil) Luciano Emílio
Substitutions:
DF	16	(Honduras) Walter López	(substituted in) 55'
FW	–	(Honduras) Jerry Palacios	(substituted in) 78'
Manager:
(Mexico) Alejandro Domínguez

19 December 2004 2nd leg	Olimpia	1–2 (a.e.t.)	Marathón	Tegucigalpa, Francisco Morazán
16:00 (UTC−06:00)	Cárcamo 67'		Simovic 95' 102'	Stadium: Estadio Tiburcio Carías Andino; Attendance: 18,000; Referee: Marcio Carranza

Olimpia	Marathón

GK	27	(Paraguay) César Velásquez
RB	16	(Honduras) Walter López
RB	–	(Honduras) Wilson Palacios	(substituted off) 86'
CB	–	(Honduras) Fabio Ulloa
CB	–	(Honduras) Mario Beata
LB	–	(Honduras) Rony Morales	(substituted off) 61'
CM	–	(Honduras) Óscar Bonilla
AM	20	(Argentina) Danilo Tosello	(substituted off) 100'
RF	-	(Honduras) Jerry Palacios
CF	11	(Honduras) Wilmer Velásquez
LF	21	(Brazil) Luciano Emílio
Substitutions:
FW	9	(Honduras) Juan Manuel Cárcamo	(substituted in) 61'
MF	-	(Honduras) Elmer Marín	(substituted in) 86'
MF	-	(Honduras) Reynaldo Tilguath	(substituted in) 100'
Manager:
(Mexico) Alejandro Domínguez

GK	1	(Honduras) Víctor Coello
RB	23	(Honduras) Mauricio Sabillón
CB	4	(Panama) Anthony Torres	(substituted off) 50'
CB	5	(Honduras) Darwin Pacheco
LB	19	(Honduras) Mario Berríos
DM	13	(Honduras) Dennis Ferrera
RM	18	(Argentina) Pablo Genovese
LM	20	(Honduras) Narciso Fernández	(substituted off) 64'
AM	8	(Argentina) Juan Yalet
CF	17	(Uruguay) Edgardo Simovic
CF	11	(Honduras) Milton Núñez
Substitutions:
DF	6	(Honduras) José Luis López	(substituted in) 50'
DF	3	(Honduras) Behiker Bustillo	(substituted in) 64'
Manager:
(Honduras) Nicolás Suazo

- Marathón won 5–3 on aggregate score.

Liga Nacional
2004–05 Apertura champion
C.D. Marathón
5th title

}

=== Squads ===
Atlético Olanchano
(Brazil) Ney Costa	(Honduras) Gustavo Brizio	(Honduras) Antonio Cálix
(Honduras) Alexander Cálix	(Honduras) Reynaldo Escobar	(Honduras) Mario Euceda
(Honduras) Nelson Guevara	(Honduras) Félix Joel Hernández	(Honduras) Mauro Henríquez
(Honduras) Malcon Hernández	(Honduras) Olman Lagos	(Honduras) Óscar Lobo
(Honduras) Allan Lalín	(Honduras) Edas Mendoza	(Honduras) Miguel Árcangel Meza
(Honduras) Óscar Morales	(Honduras) Erlyn Morán	(Honduras) Ivis Najera
(Honduras) Edgar Núñez	(Brazil) Charles de Oliveira	(Honduras) Juan Palacios
(Honduras) Marvin Paz	(Honduras) Mario Peri	(Honduras) Guillermo Armando Ramírez
(Honduras) Mario Rivera	(Honduras) Edgar Sierra	(Honduras) Fredy Vallecillo
(Colombia) Harold Yépez
Marathón
(Panama) José Anthony Torres	(Honduras) Mauricio Sabillón	(Uruguay) Edgardo Simovic
(Honduras) Emil Martínez	(Panama) Donaldo González	(Honduras) Víctor Coello
(Honduras) Ilich Arias	(Honduras) Darwin Pacheco	(Honduras) Mario Berríos
(Honduras) Behiker Bustillo	(Brazil) Denilson Costa	(Honduras) José "Babá" Güity
(Honduras) Óscar Vargas	(Honduras) Dennis Ferrera	(Honduras) Narciso "Kalusha" Fernández
(Argentina) Pablo Genovese	(Honduras) Luis Guifarro	(Honduras) José Luis López
(Honduras) Erick Fuentes	(Argentina) Juan Yalet	(Honduras) David Cáceres
(Honduras) Roberto López	(Honduras) Milton "Tyson" Núñez	(Honduras) Walter "Pery" Martínez
(Honduras) Luis Ramos	(Honduras) José Rivera	(Honduras) Héctor Rosales
(Honduras) Edwin Salvador	(Honduras) Henry Suazo	(Honduras) Irving Guerrero
(Honduras) Luis Santamaría	(Honduras) Julián Rápalo
Motagua
(Honduras) Elmer Montoya	(Honduras) Júnior Izaguirre	(Honduras) Mauricio "Pipo" Castro
(Uruguay) Marcelo Dapuerto	(Honduras) Noel Valladares	(Honduras) Víctor "Muma" Bernárdez
(Argentina) Néstor Holweber	(Honduras) Henry Enamorado	(Honduras) Rony García
(Honduras) Derrick Hulse	(Honduras) Nery Medina	(Honduras) Rubén Matamoros
(Honduras) Víctor Mena	(Honduras) Donaldo Morales	(Honduras) Pedro Fernández
(Honduras) Milton "Jocón" Reyes	(Honduras) Pompilio Cacho	(Honduras) Eddy Vásquez
(Honduras) Emilio Izaguirre	(Honduras) Mario Chirinos	(Uruguay) Fernando Garrasino
(Honduras) Abidán Solís	(Honduras) Juan José Tablada	(Honduras) Jairo "Kikí" Martínez
Olimpia
(Argentina) Danilo Tosello	(Panama) Ricardo James	(Honduras) Wilmer Velásquez
(Honduras) Donis Escober	(Brazil) Luciano Emílio	(Honduras) Mario Beata
(Honduras) José Luis Pineda	(Honduras) Hendry Thomas	(Honduras) Walter López
(Honduras) Rony Morales	(Honduras) Fabio Ulloa	(Honduras) Reynaldo Tilguath
(Brazil) Marcelo Ferreira	(Honduras) Juan Manuel Cárcamo	(Honduras) Elmer Marín
(Honduras) Óscar "Pescado" Bonilla	(Honduras) Milton Palacios	(Honduras) Wilson Palacios
(Honduras) Elvis Scott	(Honduras) Maynor Figueroa	(Honduras) José Burgos
(Honduras) Jesús Alberto Navas	(Honduras) Nahúm Ávila	(Brazil) Everaldo Ferreira
(Honduras) Jerry Palacios	(Paraguay) César Velásquez
Platense
(Honduras) Alex Andino	(Honduras) Lucio Argueta	(Honduras) Edwin Yobani Ávila
(Honduras) Cruz Fernando Ávila	(Honduras) Félix Álvarez	(Honduras) Osman Chávez
(Honduras) Ronald del Cid	(Honduras) José Díaz	(Argentina) Miguel Farrera
(Honduras) Ronald García	(Honduras) Carlos Will Mejía	(Honduras) David Mélendez
(Honduras) Bryan Oliva	(Honduras) Adalid Puerto	(Honduras) Francisco Ramírez
(Honduras) Carlos Salinas	(Honduras) Marvin Sánchez	(Honduras) Eddy Vega
(Honduras) Edwin Zaldívar
Real España
(Honduras) Erick Vallecillo	(Honduras) Marlon José Peña	(Honduras) Júnior Morales
(Honduras) Carlos Oliva	(Honduras) Antonio Arita	(Honduras) Leonardo Isaulas
(Honduras) Samir Arzú	(Honduras) Walter Hernández	(Honduras) Elder Valladares
(Honduras) Héctor Medina	(Honduras) Clifford Laing	(Honduras) Reynaldo González
(Brazil) Pedro Santana	(Honduras) Yermy Hernández	(Honduras) Sergio Mendoza
(Argentina) José Pacini	(Honduras) Abraham Handal	(Argentina) Pablo Iglesias
(Honduras) Luis Castillo	(Honduras) Gustavo López
Universidad
(Honduras) Santos Arrivillaga	(Honduras) Alex Roberto Bailey	(Honduras) Robel Bernárdez
(Honduras) David Cárcamo	(Honduras) Jorge Cardona	(Honduras) Miguel Castillo
(Honduras) Héctor Mauricio Cardona	(Honduras) Héctor Enrique Cardona	(Honduras) Hernán Contreras
(Honduras) Carlos Discua	(Honduras) Rony Flores	(Honduras) Dennis Girón
(Honduras) Mario Herrera	(Honduras) Luis "Güicho" Guzmán	(Honduras) Carlos Guevara
(Honduras) Astor Henríquez	(Honduras) Óscar Isaula	(Honduras) Jaime López
(Honduras) Aminadán Laínez	(Honduras) Juan Rosa Lagos	(Honduras) Luis Licona
(Honduras) Elvit Martínez	(Honduras) Justo Norales	(Honduras) Francisco Pérez
(Honduras) Límber Pérez	(Honduras) Hessler Phillips	(Honduras) Abel Rodríguez
(Honduras) Moisés Zúñiga
Valencia
(Honduras) José Barahona	(Honduras) Josué Guzmán	(Honduras) Johnny Gáldameza
(Honduras) José Álvarez	(Honduras) Carlos Navarro	(Honduras) Luis Miguel Ramos
(Honduras) Eder Guzmán	(Honduras) Meylin Soto	(Honduras) Carlos Pérez
(Honduras) Jaime Ruíz	(Honduras) Gerson Martínez	(Honduras) Ricky García
(Honduras) Glendon Cruz	(Honduras) Noel Flores	(Honduras) Christian Mitry
(Honduras) Jeffrey Brooks	(Argentina) Mariano Echeverría	(Honduras) Melvin Valladares
(Honduras) Erick Chacón	(Honduras) Nery Barrientos	(Argentina) Santiago Autino
(Panama) Alberto Zapata
Victoria
(Honduras) Ricardo Gabriel "Gato" Canales	(Honduras) John Bodden	(Honduras) Carlos Lino
(Honduras) Porciano Ávila	(Honduras) Ronald "Cuervo" Maradiaga	(Honduras) Luis Banegas
(Honduras) Dionisio Bátiz	(Honduras) Eduardo Bennett	(Honduras) Carlos "Tatín" Morán
(Honduras) Carlos Escobar	(Honduras) Héctor "Tanqueta" Flores	(Honduras) Mario Chávez
(Honduras) Óscar García Fernández	(Honduras) Nahún Güity	(Honduras) Elvin López
(Honduras) Alex Martínez	(Honduras) Javier Omar Martínez	(Honduras) Edward Mejía
(Honduras) Ignacio Mejía	(Honduras) Merlyn Membreño	(Honduras) Luis "Bombero" Ramírez
(Honduras) Néstor Reyes	(Honduras) José Rodríguez	(Honduras) Marvin Ortíz
Vida
(Honduras) Pedro Álvarez	(Honduras) Christian Garden	(Honduras) Leonardo Morales
(Honduras) Jorge Ocampo	(Honduras) Lenín Suárez	(Honduras) Christian Efraín Martínez
(Honduras) Darío Rivera	(Honduras) José Luis García	(Honduras) Marco "Maco" Mejía
(Honduras) Diktmar Hernández	(Honduras) Orvin "Pato" Cabrera	(Argentina) Diego de Rosa
(Honduras) Martín Paradiso	(Honduras) Luis "Tanque" Oseguera	(Honduras) Johnny Calderón
(Honduras) Hernán Fúnez	(Honduras) José Navarro	(Honduras) Erick Norales
(Argentina) Fabián Cuneo	(Honduras) Nelson Andino	(Honduras) Walter Ramírez
(Honduras) Borghy Arbizú	(Honduras) Jorge Claros	(Honduras) Joel Lagos
(Honduras) Enrique Centeno Reneau	(Honduras) José García

=== Top goalscorers ===
As of 19 December 2004

16 goals

- (Brazil) Luciano Emílio (Olimpia)

14 goals

- (Honduras) Eduardo Bennett (Victoria)

11 goals

- (Honduras) Luis Ramírez (Victoria)

10 goals

- (Brazil) Ney Costa (Atlético Olanchano)

9 goals

- (Honduras) Wilmer Velásquez (Olimpia)

8 goals

- (Uruguay) Edgardo Simovic (Marathón)

7 goals

- (Brazil) Pedro Santana (Real España)
- (Argentina) Danilo Tosello (Olimpia)

6 goals

- (Honduras) José Francisco Ramírez (Platense)
- (Argentina) José Pacini (Real España)

5 goals

- (Honduras) Eddy Vega (Platense)
- (Haiti) Rudy Lormera (Universidad)

4 goals

- (Honduras) Milton Núñez (Marathón)
- (Honduras) Mario Berríos (Marathón)
- (Argentina) Santiago Autino (Valencia)
- (Brazil) Charles de Oliveira (Atlético Olanchano)
- (Honduras) Carlos Morán (Victoria)

3 goals

- (Honduras) Limbert Pérez (Universidad)
- (Honduras) Elvis Scott (Olimpia)
- (Honduras) Elmer Montoya (Motagua)
- (Honduras) Dirkmart Hernández (Vida)
- (Honduras) Edgar Nuñez (Real España)
- (Honduras) Pompilio Cacho (Motagua)
- (Honduras) Meilin Soto (Valencia)
- (Honduras) Jesús Navas (Olimpia)

2 goals

- (Honduras) Nery Medina (Motagua)
- (Honduras) Jairo Martínez (Motagua)
- (Honduras) Luis Rodas (Motagua)
- (Honduras) Marvin Chávez (Victoria)
- (Honduras) Emil Martínez (Marathón)
- (Honduras) Walter Hernández (Real España)
- (Honduras) Enrique Renau (Vida)
- (Honduras) José Navarro (Vida)
- (Honduras) Luis Oseguera (Vida)
- (Honduras) Jorge Ocampo (Vida)
- (Argentina) Diego de Rosa (Vida)
- (Honduras) Mario Peri (Atlético Olanchano)
- (Brazil) Denilson Costa (Marathón)
- (Honduras) José Güity (Marathón)
- (Honduras) Jerry Palacios (Olimpia)
- (Honduras) Mario César Rodríguez (Platense)
- (Honduras) Lucio Argueta (Platense)
- (Honduras) Juan Manuel Cárcamo (Olimpia)
- (Honduras) Mauricio Castro (Valencia)
- (Honduras) Darwin Pacheco (Marathón)

1 goal

- (Honduras) Mauricio Sabillón (Marathón)
- (Honduras) Nelson Morales (Victoria)
- (Honduras) Walter Martínez (Marathón)
- (Honduras) Clifford Laing (Real España)

== Clausura ==
=== Regular season ===
==== Standings ====
Pos	Team	Pld	W	D	L	GF	GA	GD	Pts	Qualification or relegation
1	Olimpia	18	11	5	2	29	14	+15	38	Qualified to the Final round (Note: Top 4 qualified to the Final round.)
2	Marathón	18	7	6	5	24	22	+2	27	Qualified to the Final round
3	Universidad	18	6	8	4	7	8	−1	26	Qualified to the Final round
4	Platense	18	6	6	6	24	19	+5	24	Qualified to the Final round
5	Motagua	18	4	11	3	18	18	0	23	
6	Real España	18	5	7	6	22	22	0	22	
7	Vida	18	5	7	6	16	19	−3	22	
8	Victoria	18	5	6	7	19	24	−5	21	
9	Municipal Valencia	18	3	9	6	10	13	−3	18	
10	Atlético Olanchano	18	3	5	10	21	31	−10	14	

==== Results table ====
Home \ Away	OLA	MAR	MOT	OLI	PLA	RES	UNI	VAL	VIC	VID
Atlético Olanchano		1–2	2–2	1–2	1–1	3–2	2–0	1–1	2–1	0–1
Marathón	0–0		3–1	0–0	1–4	4–3	1–0	2–1	0–1	0–0
Motagua	2–2	1–1		0–0	1–1	2–1	0–0	0–0	2–1	1–1
Olimpia	3–2	1–2	2–0		1–0	2–2	0–0	2–1	5–0	1–0
Platense	6–2	1–3	0–0	4–2		2–1	0–1	1–0	1–1	0–0
Real España	1–1	1–1	1–0	1–1	3–1		1–0	0–0	0–0	3–4
Universidad	1–0	2–1	0–0	0–3	1–0	0–0		0–0	0–0	1–0
Municipal Valencia	1–0	2–1	0–1	0–1	1–0	0–0	0–0		1–2	1–1
Victoria	2–0	3–2	2–2	1–2	0–2	1–2	0–0	0–0		1–2
Vida	3–2	0–0	1–3	0–1	0–0	1–0	0–1	1–1	1–3	

Source: RSSSF.com–Honduras 2004/05
Legend: Blue = home team win; Yellow = draw; Red = away team win.

=== Final round ===
==== Semifinals ====
===== Olimpia vs Platense =====
12 May 2005 1st leg	Platense	1–1	Olimpia	Puerto Cortés, Cortés
19:30 (UTC−06:00)	Lozano		Velásquez	Stadium: Estadio Excélsior

15 May 2005 2nd leg	Olimpia	3–0	Platense	Tegucigalpa, Francisco Morazán
16:00 (UTC−06:00)	Turcios; Bonilla			Stadium: Estadio Tiburcio Carías Andino

- Olimpia won 4–1 on aggregate.

===== Marathón vs Universidad =====
11 May 2005 1st leg	Universidad	1–1	Marathón	Comayagua, Comayagua
15:00 (UTC−06:00)	Scott		Simovic	Stadium: Estadio Carlos Miranda

14 May 2005 2nd leg	Marathón	0–0	Universidad	San Pedro Sula, Cortés
19:30 (UTC−06:00)				Stadium: Estadio Olímpico Metropolitano

- Marathón 1–1 Universidad on aggregate; Marathón won on better regular season performance.

==== Final ====
===== Olimpia vs Marathón =====
22 May 2005 1st leg	Marathón	1–1	Olimpia	San Pedro Sula, Cortés
15:00 CST	Núñez		Velásquez	Stadium: Estadio Olímpico Metropolitano; Referee: Ricardo Zelaya

29 May 2005 2nd leg	Olimpia	2–1	Marathón	Tegucigalpa, Francisco Morazán
16:00 CST	Cárcamo 3'; Tosello 75'		Núñez 37' (pen.)	Stadium: Estadio Tiburcio Carías Andino; Attendance: 30,000

Olimpia	Marathón

GK	27	(Honduras) Donis Escober
RB	–	(Honduras) Wilson Palacios
CB	–	(Honduras) Rony Morales	(substituted off) 86'
CB	–	(Honduras) Mario Beata
CB	–	(Honduras) Maynor Figueroa
CM	–	(Honduras) José Luis Pineda
CM	–	(Honduras) Boniek García
RM	16	(Honduras) Walter López	(substituted off) 52'
LM	-	(Honduras) Dani Turcios
LS	11	(Honduras) Wilmer Velásquez	(substituted off) 57'
RS	9	(Honduras) Juan Manuel Cárcamo
Substitutions:
AM	18	(Argentina) Danilo Tosello	(substituted in) 52'
CM	-	(Honduras) Óscar Bonilla	(substituted in) 57'
Manager:
(Honduras) Nahúm Espinoza

GK	-	(Panama) Donaldo González
RB	23	(Honduras) Mauricio Sabillón	(substituted off) 61'
CB	4	(Panama) Anthony Torres
CB	5	(Honduras) Darwin Pacheco
LB	3	(Honduras) Behiker Bustillo
CM	19	(Honduras) Mario Berríos
CM	–	(Argentina) Pablo Genovese
CM	24	(Honduras) Luis Guifarro
AM	8	(Argentina) Juan Yalet	(substituted off) 69'
LS	17	(Uruguay) Edgardo Simovic
RS	11	(Honduras) Milton Núñez
Substitutions:
RB	29	(Honduras) David Cáceres	(substituted in) 61'
CM	7	(Honduras) Emil Martínez	(substituted in) 69'
Manager:
(Honduras) Nicolás Suazo

- Olimpia won 3–2 on aggregate.

=== Top goalscorers ===
As of 29 May 2005

10 goals

- (Honduras) Francisco Ramírez (Platense)

== Relegation table ==
Relegation was determined by the aggregate table of both Apertura and Clausura tournaments.

Pos	Team	Pld	W	D	L	GF	GA	GD	Pts	Qualification or relegation
1	Olimpia	36	23	8	5	68	31	+37	77	Qualified to the 2005 Copa Interclubes UNCAF (Note: Marathón and Olimpia qualified to the 2005 Copa Interclubes UNCAF as winners the Apertura and Clausura tournament respectively.)
2	Marathón	36	17	10	9	47	39	+8	61	Qualified to the 2005 Copa Interclubes UNCAF
3	Real España	36	14	11	11	45	33	+12	53	
4	Victoria	36	13	13	10	51	50	+1	52	
5	Platense	36	12	9	15	45	47	−2	45	
6	Vida	36	11	11	14	36	42	−6	44	
7	Motagua	36	8	17	11	38	43	−5	41	
8	Municipal Valencia	36	7	16	13	27	38	−11	37	
9	Universidad	36	8	12	16	19	38	−19	36	
10	Atlético Olanchano	36	7	13	16	44	58	−14	34	Relegated to the 2005–06 Liga de Ascenso

Updated to match(es) played on 7 May 2005. Source:
