= Édgar Álvarez =

Honduran footballer (born 1980)

Personal information
- Full name: Edgard Anthony Álvarez Reyes
- Date of birth: 9 January 1980 (age 46)
- Place of birth: Puerto Cortes, Honduras
- Height: 1.72 m (5 ft 8 in)
- Position: Right winger

Senior career*
Years	Team	Apps	(Gls)
1996–2003	Platense	102	(9)
2003–2006	Peñarol	26	(0)
2004–2005	→ Cagliari (loan)	15	(1)
2005–2006	→ Roma (loan)	20	(0)
2006–2009	Roma	1	(0)
2006–2007	→ Messina (loan)	32	(2)
2007–2008	→ Livorno (loan)	8	(0)
2008–2009	→ Pisa (loan)	27	(5)
2009–2011	Bari	65	(4)
2011–2012	Palermo	8	(0)
2012	Dinamo București	5	(0)
2013–2019	Platense	156	(7)

International career
2001–2013	Honduras	54	(3)
- * Club domestic league appearances and goals as of 27 January 2019

Édgar or Edgard Anthony Álvarez Reyes (born 9 January 1980) is a Honduran former soccer player who last played for Platense in the Liga Nacional de Fútbol de Honduras.

Primarily a winger, he could play anywhere on the right flank.

== Club career ==
=== Club Atlético Peñarol ===
Nicknamed El Mosky or El Jet Álvarez (The Jet Alvarez), he was linked to the Uruguayan club when he was 24. Uruguayan Peñarol was champion in 2003 after winning the Clausura finals against Nacional and hand coach Diego Aguirre. In that team unquestioned right side Honduran Edgar Alvarez was, who had come to the club after playing seven seasons at Deportivo Platense in his country. The player was considered by Diego Aguirre as important in his scheme.

=== A.S. Roma ===
After a successful loan period, AS Roma paid €1.5 million to Peñarol, but immediately loaned him to Messina and granted the club an option to buy him for €1.9 million. He signed a 5-year contract.

After spending the 2006–07 season at Messina Álvarez returned to Roma. At the summer transfer period AS Roma bought Mauro Esposito and Álvarez decided to leave Roma for Livorno, who maintained an option to buy him for €2 million. He left Roma due to the surplus of right midfielders. After spending the 2007–08 season at Livorno, Alvarez returned to Roma, and spent a full pre-season with the club, But he was loaned for the 2008–09 season to Pisa on 1 September 2008.

=== F.C. Bari 1908 ===
In 2009, he moved to Bari, on a permanent basis. The first year with the pugliesi turned out well. Under the guidance of Giampiero Ventura Álvarez became one of the best wings in Serie A. The second year did not turn out as well though and the club finished the season in last, moving to Serie B. Over two years Álvarez played in 65 league games, scoring 4 goals.

=== U.S. Città di Palermo ===
On 31 August 2011 Álvarez moved to Palermo as the player agreed to a two-year contract with the club.

=== FC Dinamo București ===
In July 2012, he moved to Liga I side Dinamo București and later signed a one-year contract with the Romanian side. He played only five games for Dinamo, his evolution being marred by his injuries. His contract was ended by mutual consent in December 2012.

== Playing style ==
Álvarez is known for his searing pace and acceleration, both on and off the ball. He is also very agile, making him very difficult for defenders to mark.

== International career ==
Álvarez played at the 1999 World Youth Cup and made his senior debut for Honduras in a 2001 UNCAF Nations Cup match against Panama, coming on as a second-half substitute for Mauricio Sabillón. As of July 2012, has earned 51 caps, scoring 3 goals. He has represented his country in 10 FIFA World Cup qualification matches and played at the 2001 and 2003 UNCAF Nations Cups as well as at the 2003 and 2007 CONCACAF Gold Cups. But most importantly, he was part of the 2010 FIFA World Cup squad and played in two matches.

=== International goals ===
Scores and results list Honduras' goal tally first.

#	Date	Venue	Opponent	Score	Result	Competition
1	22 June 2003	The Home Depot Center, Carson, United States	Guatemala	2–1	2–1	Friendly match
2	16 November 2003	Robertson Stadium, Houston, United States	Finland	1–2	1–2	Friendly match
3	19 June 2004	Estadio Olímpico Metropolitano, San Pedro Sula, Honduras	Netherlands Antilles	3–0	4–0	2006 FIFA World Cup qualification

== Honours and awards ==
=== Club ===
Associazione Sportiva Roma

- Supercoppa Italiana (1): 2007
- Coppa Italia: 2007–08

Peñarol

- Uruguayan Primera División (1): 2003

C.D. Platense

- Liga Nacional de Fútbol Profesional de Honduras (1): 2000–01
- Honduran Cup (2): 1996, 1997
