= Wilmer Velásquez =

Honduran footballer (born 1972)

Personal information
- Full name: Wilmer Raynel Neal Velásquez
- Date of birth: April 28, 1972 (age 54)
- Place of birth: Tela, Honduras
- Height: 1.70 m (5 ft 7 in)
- Position: Striker

Senior career*
Years	Team	Apps	(Gls)
1991–1995	Olimpia	35	(12)
1996	Concepción	19	(8)
1996–1998	Olimpia	78	(48)
1999	Sport-Recife	8	(1)
1999–2000	Olimpia	61	(32)
2001	Atlas	13	(1)
2001–2009	Olimpia	287	(120)
Total		489	(222)

International career^{‡}
1994–2007	Honduras	48	(34)
- * Club domestic league appearances and goals as of 2007 ‡ National team caps and goals as of 23 September 2026

Wilmer Raynel Neal Velásquez (born April 28, 1972) is a retired Honduran footballer who played as a forward. He was regarded as one of the greatest footballers in Honduran soccer for Olimpia, and by foremost as the nation's greatest striker ever alongside Carlos Pavón.

He is currently the all-time top goalscorer in the Honduran National Football League with 196 goals, and was the second player to reach 150 goals after Denilson Costa.

== Club career ==
Nicknamed El Matador, Velásquez started his professional career with Olimpia and he would not play for any other Honduran team during his career. He made his debut on 1 November 1990 against Platense and scored his first goal on 23 January 1992 against city rivals Motagua. He did play for other teams though, with Concepción in Chile, Sport-Recife in Brazil and Atlas in Mexico but was not very successful with all of them.

In 2005, Velásquez was crowned one of the Top Goalscorers in the World by the International Federation of Football History and Statistics. He made 15 goals with both the Honduras national football team and his club, Olimpia, finishing second only behind Brazilian player Adriano Leite Ribeiro, who scored 18 goals.

He has won 12 titles of the Honduran League, all of them with Olimpia. In December 2008 he announced he would retire after the 2009 Clausura. He has scored 318 goals in competitive games, 258 of them for Olimpia.

== International career ==
Velásquez made his debut for Honduras in an April 1997 UNCAF Nations Cup match against Panama in which he famously scored four goals. He has earned a total of 47 caps, scoring 34 goals. He has represented his country in only 2 FIFA World Cup qualification matches and played at the 1997, 2005 and 2007 UNCAF Nations Cups as well as at the 1998, 2003 and 2005 CONCACAF Gold Cups. In 2009, he qualified with Honduras to the 2010 fifa world cup (an achievement not done by the Honduran Football team since 1982) scoring the tie-break goal against El Salvador that qualified his team to the world cup.

His final international was a June-July FIFA World cup 2010 match against Switzerland national football team.

== Career statistics ==
=== Club ===
Club	Season	League		Cup		League Cup		CONCACAF		Other (Note: Includes other competitive competitions, including the FA Community Shield, UEFA Super Cup, Intercontinental Cup, FIFA Club World Cup)		Total	
Club	Season	Apps	Goals	Apps	Goals	Apps	Goals	Apps	Goals	Apps	Goals	Apps	Goals
Olimpia	1990–91	2	0										
Olimpia	1991–92	8	2										
Olimpia	1992–93	4	1										
Olimpia	1993–94	10	3										
Olimpia	1994–95	11	6										
Olimpia	1996–97	17	9										
Olimpia	1997–98 A	24	19										
Olimpia	1997–98 C	20	15										
Olimpia	1998–99	4	4										
Olimpia	1999–2000 A	19	12										
Olimpia	1999–2000 C	19	12										
Olimpia	2000–01 A	18	9										
Olimpia	2001–02 A	12	7										
Olimpia	2001–02 C	19	10										
Olimpia	2002–03 A	19	6										
Olimpia	2002–03 C	18	4										
Olimpia	2003–04 A	18	6										
Olimpia	2003–04 C	7	2										
Olimpia	2004–05 A	19	9										
Olimpia	2004–05 C	16	6										
Olimpia	2005–06 A	16	5										
Olimpia	2005–06 C	15	3										
Olimpia	2006–07 A	17	9										
Olimpia	2006–07 C	14	6										
Olimpia	2007–08 A	11	2										
Olimpia	2007–08 C	18	10										
Olimpia	2008–09 A	15	5										
Olimpia	2008–09 C	18	6										
Olimpia	2009–10 A	17	8										
Total		400	196										

=== International goals ===
#	Date	Venue	Opponent	Score	Result	Competition			
1.	December 11, 1994	Fullerton, California, USA	United States	1–1	Draw	Friendly			
2.	April 16, 1997	Estadio Mateo Flores, Guatemala City, Guatemala	Panama	5–0	Win	1997 UNCAF Nations Cup			
3.	April 16, 1997	Estadio Mateo Flores, Guatemala City, Guatemala	Panama	5–0	Win	1997 UNCAF Nations Cup			
4.	April 16, 1997	Estadio Mateo Flores, Guatemala City, Guatemala	Panama	5–0	Win	1997 UNCAF Nations Cup			
5.	April 16, 1997	Estadio Mateo Flores, Guatemala City, Guatemala	Panama	5–0	Win	1997 UNCAF Nations Cup			
6.	April 18, 1997	Estadio Mateo Flores, Guatemala City, Guatemala	El Salvador	3–0	Win	1997 UNCAF Nations Cup			
7.	April 18, 1997	Estadio Mateo Flores, Guatemala City, Guatemala	El Salvador	3–0	Win	1997 UNCAF Nations Cup			
8.	January 21, 1998	Estadio Chorotega de Nicoya, Nicoya, Costa Rica	Costa Rica	4–1	Win	Friendly			
9.	January 21, 1998	Estadio Chorotega de Nicoya, Nicoya, Costa Rica	Costa Rica	4–1	Win	Friendly			
10.	January 29, 1998	San Salvador, El Salvador	El Salvador	1–1	Tie	Friendly			
11.	November 17, 1999	Estadio Imperio del Sol Naciente, Tegucigalpa, Honduras	Trinidad and Tobago	3–2	Win	Friendly			
12.	March 8, 2000	Estadio Casa Blanca, Quito, Ecuador	Ecuador	3–1	Win	Friendly			
13.	November 14, 2000	Arnos Vale Stadium, Kingstown, Saint Vincent and the Grenadines	Saint Vincent and the Grenadines	7–0	Win	World Cup 2002 Qualifier			
14.	April 25, 2003	Stade En Camée, Rivière-Pilote, Martinique	Trinidad and Tobago	2–0	Win	2003 CONCACAF Gold Cup qualifier			
15.	April 27, 2003	Stade d'Honneur de Dillon, Fort-de-France, Martinique	Martinique	4–2	Win	2003 CONCACAF Gold Cup qualifier			
16.	June 7, 2003	Stade d'Honneur de Dillon, Fort-de-France, Martinique	Martinique	Orange Bowl, Miami, United States	Venezuela	2003 CONCACAF Gold Cup qualifier	1–2	Loss	Friendly
17.	June 29, 2003	Estadio Olímpico Metropolitano, San Pedro Sula, Honduras	El Salvador	1–1	Tie	Friendly			
18.	February 19, 2005	Estadio Mateo Flores, Guatemala City, Guatemala	Nicaragua	5–1	Win	2005 UNCAF Nations Cup			
19.	February 19, 2005	Estadio Mateo Flores, Guatemala City, Guatemala	Nicaragua	5–1	Win	2005 UNCAF Nations Cup			
20.	February 19, 2005	Estadio Mateo Flores, Guatemala City, Guatemala	Nicaragua	5–1	Win	2005 UNCAF Nations Cup			
21.	February 21, 2005	Estadio Mateo Flores, Guatemala City, Guatemala	Belize	4–0	Win	2005 UNCAF Nations Cup			
22.	February 23, 2005	Estadio Mateo Flores, Guatemala City, Guatemala	Guatemala	1–1	Win	2005 UNCAF Nations Cup			
23.	February 25, 2005	Estadio Mateo Flores, Guatemala City, Guatemala	Panama	1–0	Win	2005 UNCAF Nations Cup			
24.	July 2, 2005	Swangard Stadium, Burnaby, Canada	Canada	2–1	Win	Friendly			
25.	July 10, 2005	Orange Bowl, Miami, United States	Colombia	2–1	Win	2005 CONCACAF Gold Cup			
26.	July 10, 2005	Orange Bowl, Miami, United States	Colombia	2–1	Win	2005 CONCACAF Gold Cup			
27.	July 16, 2005	Gillette Stadium, Foxboro, United States	Costa Rica	3–2	Win	2005 CONCACAF Gold Cup			
28.	September 7, 2005	Miyagi Stadium, Miyagi, Japan	Japan	4–5	Loss	Friendly			
29.	September 7, 2005	Miyagi Stadium, Miyagi, Japan	Japan	4–5	Loss	Friendly			
30.	September 7, 2005	Miyagi Stadium, Miyagi, Japan	Japan	4–5	Loss	Friendly			
31.	February 15, 2007	Estadio Cuscatlán, San Salvador, El Salvador	Nicaragua	2–0	9–1	2007 UNCAF Nations Cup			
32.	February 15, 2007	Estadio Cuscatlán, San Salvador, El Salvador	Nicaragua	3–0	9–1	2007 UNCAF Nations Cup			
33.	February 15, 2007	Estadio Cuscatlán, San Salvador, El Salvador	Nicaragua	4–1	9–1	2007 UNCAF Nations Cup			
34.	February 15, 2007	Estadio Cuscatlán, San Salvador, El Salvador	Nicaragua	5–1	9–1	2007 UNCAF Nations Cup			

== Honours and awards ==
=== Club ===
CD Olimpia

- Copa Interclubes UNCAF (2): 1999, 2000
- Honduran Super Cup (1): 1996–97
- Liga Profesional de Honduras (13): 1992–93, 1995–96, 1996–97, 1998–99, 2000–01 A, 2002–03 A, 2003–04 C, 2004–05 C, 2005–06 A, 2005–06 C, 2007–08 C, 2008–09 C, 2009–10 C
- Honduran Cup (1): 1995

=== Individual ===
- Copa Centroamericana Top Goalscorer (3): 1997, 2005, 2007
- Top goalscorers in Liga Nacional de Honduras (4): 1997–98 A, 1997–98 C, 1999–00 A, 2007–08 C
- All-time Top Scorer of Liga Nacional de Honduras: 196 goals
- All-time Top Scorer of Club Deportivo Olimpia: 196 goals
- CONCACAF Gold Cup Best XI: 2005
- CONCACAF Gold Cup Top Goalscorer: 2005
