= Luciano Emílio =

Brazilian footballer

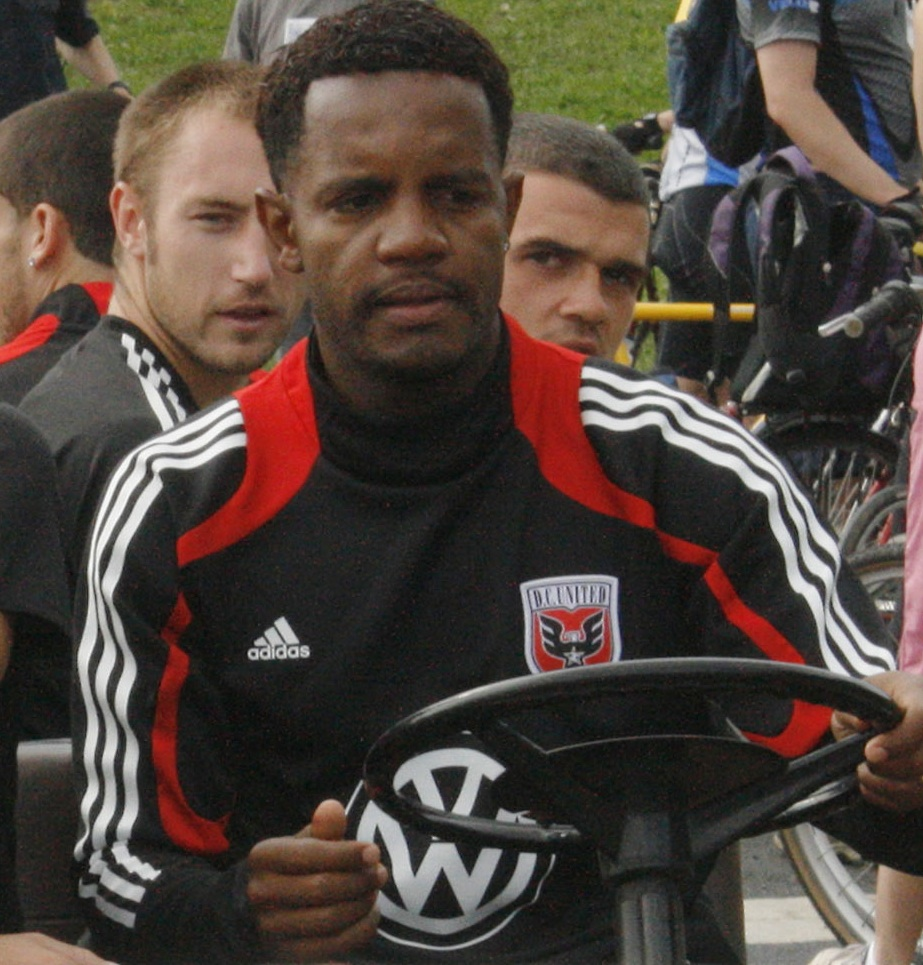
- Luciano in 2008

Personal information
- Full name: Luciano Emílio
- Date of birth: 12 December 1978 (age 47)
- Place of birth: Ilha Solteira, Brazil
- Height: 5 ft 11 in (1.80 m)
- Position: Striker

Youth career
- 1995: XV de Piracicaba
- 1996–1997: Rio Branco-SP

Senior career*
Years	Team	Apps	(Gls)
1997–1999	1. FC Köln	6	(0)
1999–2001	Alemannia Aachen	24	(1)
2001–2002	União Barbarense	23	(2)
2002–2004	Real España	68	(45)
2004–2005	Olimpia	20	(16)
2005	Querétaro	19	(10)
2005–2006	Olimpia	56	(27)
2007–2009	D.C. United	83	(41)
2010	Rio Branco-SP	11	(1)
2010	D.C. United	4	(0)
2010–2011	Danubio	6	(1)
2011	Atlante	19	(3)
2011–2012	Toros Neza	35	(19)
2012	Olimpia	5	(1)
2013	Grêmio Catanduvense	4	(0)
Total		383	(167)
- * Club domestic league appearances and goals

Luciano Emílio (born 12 December 1978) is a Brazilian former professional footballer who played as a striker.

== Career ==
=== Early career ===
Emílio started playing professional soccer at the age of 16 in 1995, playing for XV de Piracicaba, a member of the state league of São Paulo. The next season, he transferred to Rio Branco, another team in the state league of São Paulo.

In 1997, Emílio signed with 1. FC Köln of the German Bundesliga. He played for the youth team and worked his way up to the senior team where he played for several matches.

In 1999, Emílio transferred to Alemannia Aachen, a team in the second division of the Bundesliga.

=== Honduras and Mexico ===
In 2001, Luciano Emílio made a return to Brazil to play for União Barbarense. After a brief stint at União Barbarense, Emílio made a move to the Honduran league to play for Real España in Honduras. He quickly established himself as a key player and won the league scoring titles in 2003 and 2004. He helped lead Real España to the Apertura Championship in 2003. In 2004, Emílio made a move to another Honduran team, Olimpia. Emílio won another scoring title in the Apertura in 2004 with Olimpia.

Emílio enjoyed a brief stint in Mexico in 2005, signing the Mexican second division side Querétaro where he helped the team win the 2005 Clausura title, scoring 10 goals in the process. After playing for a short time with Querataro, Emílio made a return to CD Olimpia in 2005 in time to lead them to championships in the 2005 Apertura and the 2006 Clausura, during which he once again won the scoring title. In 2006, Emílio's eight goals in the UNCAF Tournament were enough to propel his team to the 2007 CONCACAF Champions' cup. Ironically, Emílio would go on to play against CD Olimpia in the 2007 CONCACAF Champions' Cup with his new club, D.C. United.

=== Major League Soccer ===
Emilio signed with D.C. United on 16 January 2007, as a Senior International player, after completing his second stint with Honduran club Olimpia. Emílio debuted for United in the 2007 CONCACAF Champions' Cup against Olimpia, scoring once in Tegucigalpa and twice in the return leg in Washington, DC in United's 7–3 aggregate win. He went on to score a fourth time in three games versus C.D. Guadalajara in the opening game of the CONCACAF semi-final.

At the end of his first season with D.C. United, his team received the 2007 MLS Supporters' Shield, the award for gaining the most points overall in a season. In the 2007 MLS season, Emílio had 20 goals and won the MLS Golden Boot award. Emílio won the 2007 MLS MVP award and the inaugural 2007 MLS Newcomer of the Year Award.

After recovering from a lean start to the 2008 season, Emílio scored his first career MLS hat-trick on 14 June against New York Red Bulls.

Though not originally signed under the Designated Player Rule, he later received a pay rise which took him over the maximum salary covered by the league, becoming a designated player.

Emílio received a green card in August 2009 for permanent residency in the United States and no longer counted against DC United's foreign player limit.

Emílio rejected a new contract with D.C. United that would have seen him sign at a significantly lower salary. He later joined former club Rio Branco, but on 28 April 2010, Emilio signed a three-month contract to return to former club D.C. United. He was released by D.C. United at the end of this short-term contract.

=== Later career ===
In August 2010, Emilio joined Uruguayan club Danubio, which plays in Primera División Uruguaya.

Emílio returned to Mexico to play for Atlante UTN in "La División de Ascenso" Mexico's Second Division for the Clausura 2011 Tournament.

== Career statistics ==
=== Club ===
As of match played 5 April 2014

Appearances and goals by club, season and competition
Club	Season	League			Cup		League Cup		Continental		Total	
Club	Season	Division	Apps	Goals	Apps	Goals	Apps	Goals	Apps	Goals	Apps	Goals
1. FC Köln	1996–97	Bundesliga	6	0	0	0	0	0	0	0	6	0
1. FC Köln	1997–98	Bundesliga	0	0	0	0	0	0	0	0	0	0
1. FC Köln	1998–99	Bundesliga	0	0	0	0	0	0	0	0	0	0
Real España	2002–03	Liga Nacional	34	21	—		—		—		34	21
Real España	2003–04	Liga Nacional	34	24	—		—		—		34	24
Real España	Total		68	45	0	0	0	0	0	0	68	45
Olimpia	2004–05	Liga Nacional	20	16	—		—		—		20	16
Olimpia	2005–06	Liga Nacional	38	22	—		—		—		38	22
Olimpia	2006–07	Liga Nacional	18	5	—		—		—		18	5
Olimpia	Total		76	43	0	0	0	0	0	0	76	43
D.C. United	2007	MLS	29	20	1	0	2	0	8	4	40	24
D.C. United	2008	MLS	27	11	2	3	—		7	2	35	16
D.C. United	2009	MLS	27	10	3	0	—		5	3	35	13
D.C. United	2010	MLS	4	0	0	0	—		—		4	0
D.C. United	Total		87	41	6	3	2	0	20	9	115	53
Rio Branco	2010	Série C	11	1	0	0	0	0	0	0	11	1
Danubio	2010–11	Primera División	6	1	—		—		—		6	1
Toros Neza	2010–11	Ascenso MX	19	3	—		—		—		19	3
Toros Neza	2011–12	Ascenso MX	35	19	—		—		—		35	19
Toros Neza	Total		54	22	0	0	0	0	0	0	54	22
Olimpia	2012–13	Liga Nacional	5	1	—		—		—		5	1
Grêmio Catanduvense	2013–14	Série A3	4	0	—		—		—		4	0
Career total			317	154	6	3	2	0	20	9	345	166

== Honours ==
=== Club ===
D.C. United

- Major League Soccer Supporter's Shield: 2007
- Lamar Hunt U.S. Open Cup: 2008

Olimpia

- Liga Nacional de Fútbol de Honduras: 2004–05 Clausura, 2005–06 Apertura, 2005–06 Clausura

Querétaro

- Primera División A: Clausura 2005

Real España

- Liga Nacional de Fútbol de Honduras: 2003–04 Apertura

XV de Piracicaba

- Campeonato Brasileiro Série C: 1995

=== Individual ===
- Major League Soccer MVP: 2007
- MLS Golden Boot Winner: 2007
- MLS Newcomer of the Year: 2007
- MLS Best XI: 2007
