= Yermy Hernández =

Honduran footballer (born 1980)

Personal information
- Full name: Yermy Adalberto Hernández Alvarez
- Date of birth: December 2, 1980 (age 45)
- Place of birth: La Ceiba, Honduras
- Position: Defender

Team information
- Current team: Victoria
- Number: 16

Senior career*
Years	Team	Apps	(Gls)
2000–2007	Real España		
2008	Platense	9	(0)
2008–2009	Real España		
2009	Heredia		
2009–2011	Hispano		
2011–	Victoria		

International career^{‡}
2006–2007	Honduras	3	(0)
- * Club domestic league appearances and goals as of 2007 ‡ National team caps and goals as of 2007

Yermy Adalberto Hernández Alvarez (born December 2, 1980) is a Honduran football defender who currently plays for Victoria in the Liga Nacional de Honduras.

== Club career ==
He made his senior debut with Real España and had a short spell at Platense. After a season abroad with Guatemalan side Heredia, he joined Hispano. He moved to Victoria before the 2011 Apertura season.

== International career ==
Hernández made his debut for Honduras in a friendly match against Venezuela and has earned a total of 3 caps, scoring no goals. He has represented his country at the 2007 UNCAF Nations Cup.

His final international was a February 2007 UNCAF Nations Cup match against Panama.
