= Marcelo Verón =

Argentine footballer (born 1978)

Personal information
- Full name: Marcelo Andrés Verón
- Date of birth: 8 January 1978 (age 48)
- Place of birth: Buenos Aires, Argentina
- Position: Forward

Senior career*
Years	Team	Apps	(Gls)
1999–2000	Platense		
2000	Salgueiros		
2000–2001	Platense	44	(23)
2001	Motagua	21	(7)
2002	Stade Tunisien		
2002	Cobras de Ciudad Juárez		
2002–2003	Cartagonova		
2003–2004	Ceuta		
2004	Colo-Colo		
2005	Novelda		
2005–2006	Deportivo Suchitepéquez		
2006	Platense	13	(5)
2007–2008	Deportivo Suchitepéquez		
2008–2009	Defensores de Belgrano		
- * Club domestic league appearances and goals

Marcelo Andrés Verón (born January 8, 1978) is an Argentine former professional footballer who played as a forward for 11 clubs. He played and scored for Colo-Colo in the 2004 Chilean Primera División Clausura. He is well known in Honduras, for playing in Platense (in two spells) and F.C. Motagua.

== Career ==
Verón was born in Buenos Aires, Argentina. In 2000, he was hired by C.D. Platense in Honduras. He won the top goalscorer title in the 2000–01 Apertura with 13 goals scored and the league title in the 2000–01 Clausura against Olimpia. Verón was then transferred to F.C. Motagua in the 2001–02 Apertura, scoring 7 goals for them and winning the league title against C.D. Marathón. In 2006, he returned for a short spell at Platense, scoring 5 goals. Verón is one of the all-time goalscorers of Platense, with 28 goals in total.

== Career statistics ==
Team	Season	Games	Goal
Club Deportivo Platense	2000-01 A	22	13
Club Deportivo Platense	2000-01 C	22	10
F.C. Motagua	2001-02 A	21	7
Club Deportivo Platense	2006-07 C	13	5
