= José Anthony Torres =

Panamanian footballer and manager (born 1972)

Personal information
- Full name: José Mario Anthony Torres
- Date of birth: 27 August 1972 (age 54)
- Place of birth: El Porvenir, Panama
- Height: 1.78 m (5 ft 10 in)
- Position: Defender

Senior career*
| Years | Team | Apps | (Gls) |
| 1996–2003 | Platense | | |
| 2003 | Real España | | |
| 2004–2005 | Marathón | | |
| 2005–2006 | Persepolis | 1 | (0) |
| 2006–2007 | Victoria | | |
| 2007–2008 | Arsenal | | |
| 2008 | Deportivo Sanarate F.C. | | |
| 2009 | C.D. Guastatoya | | |
| 2010 | Sporting San Miguelito | 27 | (1) |

International career
| 1999–2009 | Panama | 75 | (0) |

Managerial career
- 2012–2019: Sporting San Miguelito
- * Club domestic league appearances and goals

José Mario Anthony Torres (born 27 August 1972) is a Panamanian former football defender. He was nicknamed “El caballo de hierro” (the iron horse) because of tackling capabilities.

== Club career ==
Nicknamed Chalate, Torres has had a lengthy career abroad playing for Honduran sides like Platense and Arsenal Roatán. He left Platense after seven years for Real España in summer 2003.

In January 2004 he left Real España after he refused to take up Honduran citizenship which the club asked him to bypass the foreign player quota. He then joined fellow Panamanian Donaldo González at Marathón and he moved to Iran to play alongside compatriot Carlos Rivera with local giants Persepolis.

In January 2007, Torres returned to Honduras to play for Victoria after an unsuccessful spell with Persepolis. Later, he played in Guatemala for second division sides Deportivo Sanarate F.C. and C.D. Guastatoya. He returned to Panama in January 2010 after 14 years abroad when signed by Sporting San Miguelito.

== International career ==
Torres made his debut for Panama in an October 1999 friendly match against Trinidad and Tobago and has earned a total of 75 caps, scoring no goals. He represented his country in 23 FIFA World Cup qualification matches and was a member of the 2005 CONCACAF Gold Cup team, who finished second in the tournament and he also played at the 2009 CONCACAF Gold Cup.

His final international was a June 2009 friendly match against Haiti.

== Honours and awards ==
=== Club ===
C.D. Platense

- Liga Nacional de Fútbol Profesional de Honduras (1): 2000–01
- Honduran Cup (2): 1996, 1997

C.D. Marathón

- Liga Nacional de Fútbol Profesional de Honduras (1): 2004–05

Panama

- CONCACAF Gold Cup runner-up: 2005

== Managerial career ==
Anthony Torres was appointed manager of Sporting San Miguelito in September 2012 and immediately won the club's first league title in 2013.
