= 1997 Honduran Supercup =

Olimpia	Platense
1	0
- Date: 15 August 1997
- Venue: Estadio Francisco Morazán, San Pedro Sula

The 1997 Honduran Supercup was held between winners of 1996–97 Honduran Liga Nacional (Olimpia) and 1996 Honduran Cup (Platense) resulting in the Lions as winners. It was the first ever contested Honduran Supercup.

== Qualified teams ==
Team	Method of qualification	Appearances
Olimpia	Winners of 1996–97 Honduran Liga Nacional	1st
Platense	Winners of 1996 Honduran Cup	1st

== The game ==
15 August 1997
19:30 CST

Platense	0–1	Olimpia
		5' Pineda

Estadio Francisco Morazán
San Pedro Sula, Cortés

== See also ==
- 1997–98 Honduran Liga Nacional
