= Danilo Tosello =

Argentine footballer

Personal information
- Full name: Danilo Javier Tosello
- Date of birth: March 27, 1969 (age 57)
- Place of birth: Santa Fe, Argentina
- Position: Attacking midfielder

Senior career*
Years	Team	Apps	(Gls)
1994–1995	9 de Julio	-	
1995–1996	Belgrano de Córdoba	29	(12)
1997	Deportivo Español	10	(1)
1998	UANL Tigres		
1999	Defensor Sporting Club	32	(14)
1999–2007	Club Deportivo Olimpia	298	(86)
- * Club domestic league appearances and goals as of 2007 ‡ National team caps and goals as of 2005

Danilo Javier Tosello (born March 27, 1969) is a retired Argentine football (soccer) player. During his career, he won 4 championships in Honduras with Olimpia.

Tosello is the 9th highest all time goalscorer in the Liga Nacional de Honduras.

He was accused of money laundering in Honduras in 2016, he left his job as CD Olimpia's coach in January 2013 and returned to his home town in Argentina allegedly because of his father's poor health.

== Honours and awards ==
=== Player ===
C.D. Olimpia

- Liga Profesional de Honduras: 2000–01 A, 2002–03 A, 2003–04 C, 2004–05 C, 2005–06 A, 2005–06 C

=== Manager ===
C.D. Olimpia

- Liga Profesional de Honduras: 2011–12 A, 2011–12 C, 2012–13 A
