= Clásico Moderno (Honduras) =

El Clásico Moderno (The Modern Classic) also referred by some as the Clasico Moderno Hondureño is a Honduran football match played at least 4 times a year in the Honduran Liga Nacional and consists of two teams, Olimpia and Real España. The Clásico Moderno is the most fierce derby played in Honduras. The two "Barras" (MegaBarra and Commando 12 from España and Ultra Fiel from Olimpia) confront themselves with deadly results almost every time they meet. It is considered the most aggressive, violent and the strongest rivalry in Honduran soccer. During the 1970s, 1980s, and early 1990s it was considered without doubt the greatest derby of the Honduran football, during these 25 years both team won a total of 16 championships (9 Olimpia and 7 Real España), 3 during the 1970s for both teams, 4 for Olimpia and 2 for Real España during the 1980s, and 2 for both during the early 1990s. During the late half of this decade, time during which Olimpia has won 2 Championships and Real España 1, the rivalry has recover some of its luster. Both teams are the only "Tricampeones" Three-consecutive championship victories, Real España won 3 complete season championships and Olimpia 3 half season championships.

== Head to head ==
=== Regular season ===
Pos	Team	Pld	W	D	L	GF	GA	GD	Pts
1	Olimpia	184	76	69	39	220	153	+67	221
2	Real España	184	39	69	76	153	220	−67	147

Updated to match(es) played on 6 December 2020. Source:

=== Postseason ===
Pos	Team	Pld	W	D	L	GF	GA	GD	Pts
1	Olimpia	65	19	31	15	70	53	+17	69
2	Real España	65	15	31	19	53	70	−17	61

Updated to match(es) played on 6 December 2020. Source:

=== Totals ===
Pos	Team	Pld	W	D	L	GF	GA	GD	Pts
1	Olimpia	250	95	101	54	292	208	+84	291
2	Real España	250	54	101	95	208	292	−84	209

Updated to match(es) played on 6 December 2020. Source:
- Olimpia has scored 292 goals against Real España:
  - 154 at Estadio Tiburcio Carías Andino
  - 95 at Estadio General Francisco Morazán
  - 32 at Estadio Olímpico Metropolitano
  - 8 at Estadio Carlos Miranda
  - 1 at Estadio Excélsior
- Real España has scored 208 goals against Olimpia:
  - 105 at Estadio General Francisco Morazán
  - 76 at Estadio Tiburcio Carías Andino
  - 21 at Estadio Olímpico Metropolitano
  - 4 at Estadio Carlos Miranda
  - 2 at Estadio Excélsior

== Goalscorers ==
As of 6 December 2020: Wilmer Velásquez scored 17 goals against Real España and Carlos Pavón scored 9 goals against Olimpia.

== Rock Throwing ==
In two occasions España's MegaBarra have been involved with throwing rocks to two players from the Olimpia side. Due to the barbaric actions of the MegaBarra, sanctions were taken against Real España and security is tighter for these matches.

The two players who were struck by rocks were Elmer Marín (who would later player with Real España himself) and Gerson Vásquez.

== External ==
- Olimpia
- Real España
