= Eddy Vega =

Honduran footballer (born 1980)

Personal information
- Full name: Eddy Geovani Vega Acosta
- Date of birth: August 13, 1980 (age 46)
- Place of birth: Roatán, Honduras
- Height: 1.73 m (5 ft 8 in)
- Position: Forward

Team information
- Current team: Honduras Progreso

Senior career*
Years	Team	Apps	(Gls)
2004–2005	Platense		
2006	Hispano		
2006–2008	Platense		
2008–2009	Coatepeque		
2009–2010	Platense		
2010–2011	Real España		
2011–2012	Zacapa		
2012	Parrillas One		
2012	Villanueva		
2013–2014	Honduras Progreso		

International career^{‡}
2005	Honduras	1	(0)
- * Club domestic league appearances and goals as of 2007 ‡ National team caps and goals as of 2005

Eddy Geovani Vega Acosta (born 13 August 1980 on the island of Roatán) is a Honduran footballer who currently plays for Honduran second division side Honduras Progreso.

== Club career ==
Nicknamed el Animal due to his hot temper, Vega started his professional career at Platense and also played for Hispano before moving abroad to join Guatemalans Coatepeque. He returned to Platense after a year but left them for Real España in summer 2010. In 2011, he crossed the border again and signed for Zacapa in Guatemala.

In April 2013, when playing for Honduras Progreso, he was mistakenly reported by various media to be found killed near San Pedro Sula. He then did claim to have survived a car accident in March 2010.

== International career ==
Vega was a non-playing squad member at the 2005 CONCACAF Gold Cup and made his debut for Honduras in a September 2005 friendly match against Japan, which proved to be his sole international game.
