= Carlos Paes =

Honduran footballer (born 1978)

Carlos Paez
Personal information
- Full name: Carlos Ernesto Paes de Oliveira Bustillo
- Date of birth: 29 May 1978 (age 48)
- Place of birth: Tegucigalpa, Honduras
- Height: 1.64 m (5 ft 5 in)
- Position: Midfielder

Team information
- Current team: Real Juventud

Senior career*
Years	Team	Apps	(Gls)
1999–2001	Olimpia		(7)
2002	Motagua		(1)
2004	Real Maya		(2)
2008–present	Real Juventud		(4)

International career^{‡}
2000–2001	Honduras	2	(0)
- * Club domestic league appearances and goals ‡ National team caps and goals as of 27 March 2013

Carlos Ernesto Paez de Oliveira Bustillo (born 29 May 1978) is a Honduran football midfielder who plays for Real Juventud.

== Club career ==
Paez made his debut in the Honduran national league for Olimpia against Universidad on 5 April 2000. Until December 2009, he had scored 16 goals in total for Olimpia, Real Juventud, Real Comayagua, Real Patepluma and F.C. Motagua.

=== Cocaine possession ===
In April 2001, Paes, son of Olimpia's former Brazilian striker Ernesto Paes de Oliveira and Elvira Bustillo, was arrested by police in La Ceiba for carrying cocaine with him in his car. He denied however he had anything to do with the drugs but was sent to jail awaiting his court case. Eventually he was released and the case was never solved.

== International career ==
Paez played for the Honduras national football team at the 2000 Summer Olympics.

He made his senior debut for Honduras in a May 2000 friendly match against Canada and has earned a total of 2 caps, scoring no goals.

His second and final international was a March 2001 friendly match against Peru.
