= Donaldo González =

Panamanian footballer (born 1971)

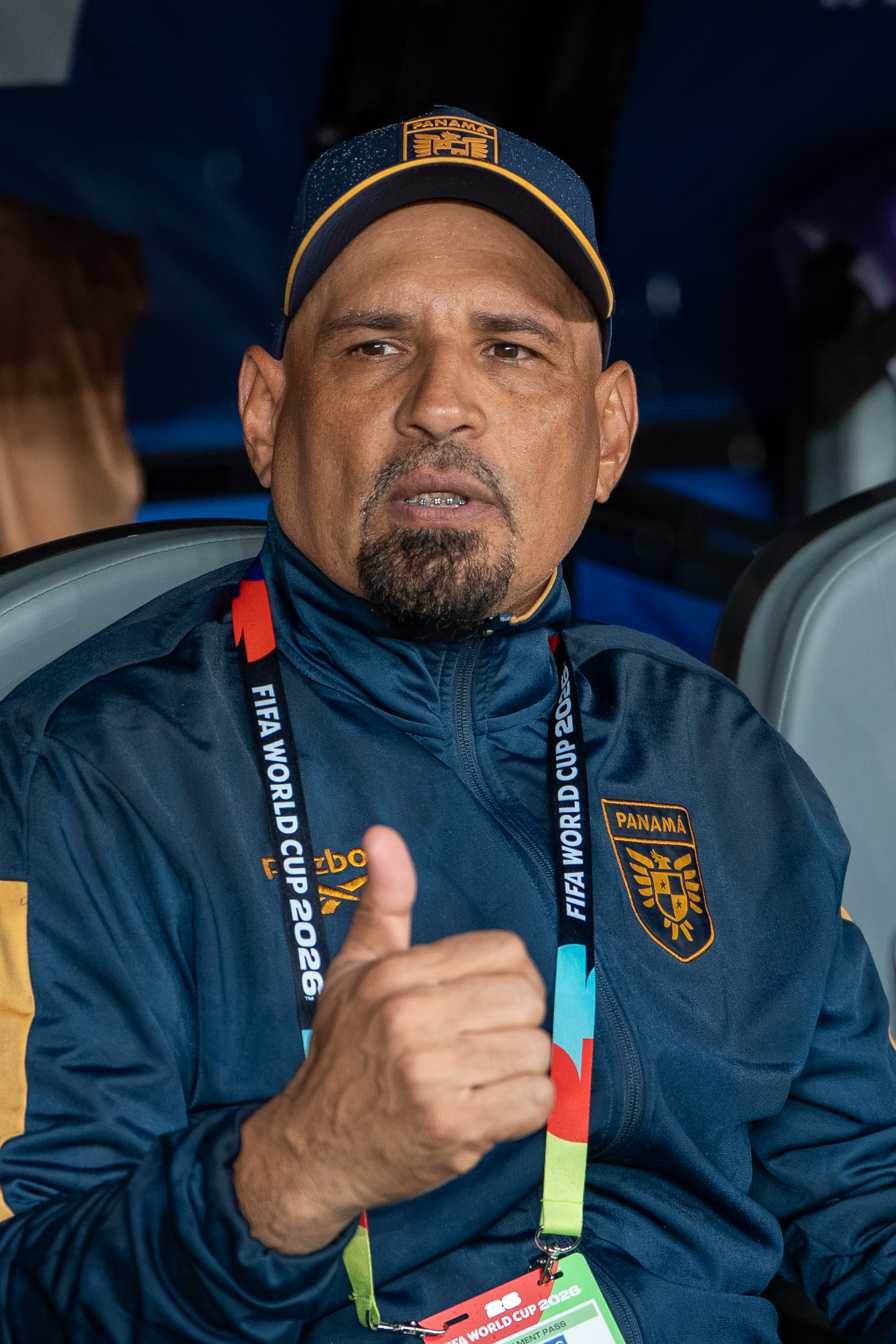
- González at the 2026 FIFA World Cup.

Personal information
- Full name: Donaldo González Barañano
- Date of birth: 27 November 1971 (age 54)
- Place of birth: Santiago de Veraguas, Panama
- Height: 1.79 m (5 ft 10 in)
- Position: Goalkeeper

Youth career
- Projusa FC

Senior career*
Years	Team	Apps	(Gls)
–2000	Tauro		
1997–2004	Olimpia		
2004–2006	Marathón		
2006–2007	Chorrillo		
2007–2008	Atlético Veragüense		

International career
1996–2006	Panama	30	(0)
- * Club domestic league appearances and goals

Donaldo González Barañano (born 27 November 1971) is a Panamanian former professional footballer who played as a goalkeeper.

== Club career ==
González was born in Santiago de Veraguas. He had a six-year spell in Honduras with Olimpia and Marathón, where he played alongside compatriot José Anthony Torres. Before moving abroad he played for Projusa de Veraguas, Bravos de Urracá and then local giants Tauro.

== International career ==
González made his debut for Panama in a November 1996 friendly match against Costa Rica and has earned a total of 30 caps, scoring no goals. He represented his country in 10 FIFA World Cup qualification matches and was a member of the 2005 CONCACAF Gold Cup team, who finished second in the tournament. His final international was a September 2006 friendly match against Guatemala.

== Retirement ==
After retiring in December 2007, González became goalkeeper coach of the national team. In summer 2015 he became goalkeeping coach at Atlético Chiriquí.

== Honours ==
Olimpia

- Liga Nacional de Fútbol Profesional de Honduras: 2000–01 A, 2002–03 A, 2003–04 C

Marathón

- Liga Nacional de Fútbol Profesional de Honduras: 2004–05 A

Panama

- CONCACAF Gold Cup runner-up: 2005
