= Pablo Genovese =

Argentine footballer

Personal information
- Full name: Pablo Daniel Genovese
- Date of birth: 26 July 1977 (age 49)
- Place of birth: Buenos Aires, Argentina
- Height: 1.82 m (5 ft 11 1/2 in)
- Position: Midfielder

Youth career
- 1990–1996: Banfield

Senior career*
Years	Team	Apps	(Gls)
1996–2000	Brown de Adrogué		
2000–2001	Argentino de Quilmes		
2001–2004	Temperley		
2004–2006	Marathón		
2006–2007	Brown de Adrogué		
2007–2011	Hispano		
2011–2012	Vida		(3)
- * Club domestic league appearances and goals

Pablo Daniel Genovese (born 26 July 1977 in Buenos Aires, Argentina) is an Argentine footballer.

He can play either as a centre midfielder or defensive midfielder.

== Career ==
=== Vida ===
On 28 November 2010, Genevese decided to move at Vida after having a poor campaign with Hispano.

On 14 January 2011, Genovese made his domestic league debut in a 1–0 away win against the current champion Real España. On 23 January 2011, Genovese scored his first goal for Vida in a 5–2 win against Deportes Savio.
