= Óscar Bonilla =

Honduran footballer (born 1978)

Personal information
- Full name: Óscar Armando Bonilla Fúnez
- Date of birth: 11 June 1978 (age 48)
- Place of birth: San Pedro Sula, Honduras
- Height: 1.67 m (5 ft 6 in)
- Positions: Fullback; midfielder

Youth career
- 1995–1998: Platense Júnior

Senior career*
Years	Team	Apps	(Gls)
1998–2001	Platense		
2001–2002	Bella Vista		
2002–2006	Olimpia	65	(2)
2007–2009	Marathón	61	(3)
2009–2010	Real España	31	(1)
2010–2012	Victoria		
2012	Olimpia	8	(0)
2012	Real Sociedad	12	(0)
2013	Parrillas One	16	(0)
2014–	Marathón	27	(2)

International career^{‡}
2003–2009	Honduras	8	(0)
- * Club domestic league appearances and goals as of 20:27, 27 July 2011 (UTC) ‡ National team caps and goals as of 8:54, 19 July 2011 (UTC)

Óscar Armando Bonilla Fúnez (born 11 June 1978) is a Honduran exfootballer who played as a defender or midfielder.

== Club career ==
Nicknamed El Pescado, Bonilla began his football career at Platense in Puerto Cortés. His performance helped him to become hired by the Uruguayan club Bella Vista in 2001. One year later, he made his way back to Honduras.

The professional Honduran football club Olimpia acquired him in the year 2002. After playing 5 years for Olimpia, he passed to Marathón in 2006–07 Clausura. Bonilla was able to win two championships with Marathón. In 2009, he was transferred to Real España, in an exchange with Mario Rodríguez.

In the following years, Óscar Bonilla played for Victoria (2010), Olimpia (2012), Real Sociedad (2012) and Parrillas One (2013).

In December 2013 he returned to Marathón.

== International career ==
Bonilla participated with the Honduras national football team, earning 8 caps and scoring no goals. Bonilla was in the 2003 CONCACAF Gold Cup, as well in the UNCAF Nations Cup 2003.
