= 1996 Honduran Cup =

Copa de Honduras 1996

Tournament details
- Country: Honduras
- Dates: 31 August – 7 November
- Teams: 10

Final positions
- Champions: Platense
- Runners-up: Victoria

Tournament statistics
- Matches played: 45
- Goals scored: 93 (2.07 per match)

The 1996 Honduran Cup was the 7th edition of the Cup tournament in the Honduran football. C.D. Platense won its first title after finishing in first position at the end of nine rounds in the 1996–97 regular season of the Honduran league.

== Results ==
Home \ Away	IND	MAR	MOT	OLI	PLA	RES	MAY	UNI	VIC	VID
Independiente Villela		0–1		1–0	0–0		2–0		2–0	
Marathón				1–2				4–0	1–3	
Motagua	4–1	2–1					1–2	1–0	1–1	
Olimpia			0–0			0–0	1–0			
Platense		3–1	1–1	2–1		2–1		2–0		1–1
Real España	1–0	0–0	1–0				1–1	2–1		
Real Maya		1–1			0–2			0–1	1–1	1–2
Universidad	1–1			1–2					1–1	
Victoria	1–0			1–2	1–0	2–1				1–0
Vida		1–1	2–1	1–2		2–1		0–1		

Source: RSSSF.com – Honduras 1996/97
Legend: Blue = home team win; Yellow = draw; Red = away team win.

== Standings ==
Pos	Team	Pld	W	D	L	GF	GA	GD	Pts
1	Platense (C)	9	5	3	1	13	6	+7	18
2	Victoria	9	5	3	1	12	7	+5	18
3	Olimpia	9	5	2	2	10	7	+3	17
4	Motagua	9	3	3	3	11	9	+2	12
5	Real España	9	3	3	3	8	8	0	12
6	Independiente Villela	9	3	2	4	7	8	−1	11
7	Vida	9	3	2	4	9	11	−2	11
8	Marathón	9	2	3	4	11	12	−1	9
9	Universidad	9	2	2	5	6	13	−7	8
10	Real Maya	9	1	3	5	6	12	−6	6

(C) Champions

1996 Honduran Cup champions
C.D. Platense
