= Elmer Marín =

Honduran footballer (born 1979)

Personal information
- Full name: Elmer Adelmo Marín Arriola
- Date of birth: October 14, 1979 (age 47)
- Place of birth: Sonaguera, Honduras
- Position: Midfielder

Senior career*
Years	Team	Apps	(Gls)
1999–2001	Olimpia		
2001–2002	Real Comayagua	13	(0)
2003–2005	Olimpia		
2005–2006	Real España		
2007–2008	Atlético Olanchano		
2008–2009	Deportes Savio	20	(0)
2009–2012	Vida		
2012–	UPNFM		

International career^{‡}
2000–2006	Honduras	13	(0)
- * Club domestic league appearances and goals as of 2007 ‡ National team caps and goals as of 2006

Elmer Adelmo Marín Arriola (born October 14, 1979) is a Honduran footballerwho currently is retired.

== Club career ==
Marín enjoyed a couple of seasons at Olimpia before moving to Real España in 2005. He left them in January 2007 for Atlético Olanchano.

In summer 2012, Marín joined second division UPNFM.

In 2005, he was the first player to be physically hurt by barras bravas during a match between Olimpia and Real Espana, when a huge bolt was thrown to his head.

Team	Season	Games	Start	Sub	Goal	YC	RC
Deportes Savio	2008-09 A	9	8	1	0	5	1

== International career ==
Marín played at the 1999 FIFA World Youth Championship.

He made his senior debut for Honduras in a May 2000 friendly match against Canada and has earned a total of 13 caps, scoring no goals. He has represented his country in 2 FIFA World Cup qualification matches.

His final international was a February 2006 friendly match against China.
