= Rony Morales =

Honduran football defender (born 1978)

Personal information
- Full name: Rony Edgardo Morales Solís
- Date of birth: 8 June 1978 (age 48)
- Place of birth: Olanchito, Honduras
- Height: 1.74 m (5 ft 9 in)
- Position: Defender

Senior career*
Years	Team	Apps	(Gls)
1996–2003	Platense	103	(9)
2003–2009	Olimpia		
2010–2014	Platense		

International career^{‡}
1999–2006	Honduras	30	(1)
- * Club domestic league appearances and goals as of 2007 ‡ National team caps and goals as of 2006

Rony Edgardo Morales Solís (born June 8, 1978) is a former Honduran football defender.

== Club career ==
A left-sided defender, Morales previously played for Olimpia.

== International career ==
Morales made his debut for Honduras in a November 1999 friendly match against Guatemala and has earned a total of 30 caps, scoring 1 goal. He has represented his country in 4 FIFA World Cup qualification matches and played at the 2001, and 2003 UNCAF Nations Cups and was a non-playing squad member at the 2003 CONCACAF Gold Cup.

His final international was an October 2006 friendly match against Guatemala.

=== International goals ===
Scores and results list Honduras' goal tally first.

N.	Date	Venue	Opponent	Score	Result	Competition
1.	16 June 2001	Hasely Crawford Stadium, Port of Spain, Trinidad and Tobago	Trinidad and Tobago	3–0	4–2	2002 FIFA World Cup qualification
