= Platense F.C. =

Honduran football club

Platense
- Full name: Platense Fútbol Club
- Nicknames: Carismático y Venerado Tiburón, Tiburones Blancos, Escualos, Los Selacios, Platense Querido, El Primer Campeón
- Founded: 4 July 1960; 66 years ago
- Ground: Estadio Excelsior, Platense, Puerto Cortés, Honduras
- Capacity: 7500
- Owner: Christian Andrés
- Chairman: (Honduras) Christian Andrés
- Manager: (Honduras) Raul Cáceres
- League: Honduran Liga Nacional
- 2025 Clausura: Regular phase: 4th
- Website: platensefutbolclubhn.weebly.com
| Home colours | Away colours |

Platense Fútbol Club or simply Platense is a Honduran football club, located in Puerto Cortés, department of Cortés.

The club was founded on 4 July 1960 and in 1965 became the first champions of the Honduran National Football League. Their home venue is the Estadio Excelsior.

== History ==
Officially Platense Sport Club was founded on July 4, 1960, in the neighborhood of Campo Rojo, Puerto Cortés. The initial founders were Roger Riera, Roberto Mejía, Roosevelt Garbut, and Rene Paiz. They were later joined by Manuel Flores, Héctor Sánchez, Rolando Méndez, Samuel Williams, Rudolph Williams, Ricardo Fúnez, Julio Linares, Óscar Pineda, Raúl Betancourt, Francisco Maldonado, Humberto Dole, Rolando Zavala and Reginaldo Guevara.

The founders looked to emulate a successful international club, and ultimately settled on Platense, inspired by Platense of Argentina. In its early years, the club was supported by the Tela Railroad Company. When amateurism was still in effect, Tela provided jobs and a salary for club athletes, and helped Platense establish itself on a solid financial footing.

After the Honduran National Soccer League was founded in 1964; Club Deportivo Platense became one of its 10 original members. They would also become its first champions, winning the league 27–26 over Olimpia.

The key players on that team were: Gilberto Zavala, Tomas Maximo, Ricardo 'Cañon' Fúnez, Felix 'Mantequilla' Guerra, Raúl Betancourt, Santos 'Kubala' Díaz, Miguel 'El Chino' Hernandez, 'Pichingo' Croasdaile, Francisco Brocatto, Carlos "Care" Alvarado, "Chita" Arzú, León Victor "Escalera" Jallú, among others.

Having won the very first title, however, Platense had to wait another thirty-six years for its second. They were close twice, finishing runners-up in 1996–97 and Apertura 2000. However, it wasn't until Clausura 2001 that Platense returned to glory.

Their opponents, Olimpia, were the most dominant and successful team in Honduras. The first leg of the tie was in Puerto Cortés and finished with a victory for the 'Tiburón' by the score of 1–0. The Argentine Marcelo Verón scored the winning goal. The return game was won by Club Olimpia by the same score. This forced the teams to go to over-time. The champion would be the team that scored the first goal (Golden goal). It was Platense's Rony Morales who proved the hero, scoring the goal that gave Platense its first title in a generation.

Platense reached two more semi-finals, but their form soon declined. In June 2012, they were relegated and were only able to stay in the top flight by virtue of a merger with CD Necaxa.

== Achievements ==
- Liga Nacional
  - Winners (2): 1965–66, 2000–01 C
  - Runners-up (4): 1996–97, 2000–01 A, 2002–03 A, 2016–17 A
- Honduran Cup
  - Winners (3): 1996, 1997, 2018
  - Runners-up (1): 2015
- Honduran Supercup
  - Runners-up (2): 1997, 1999
- Segunda División
  - Winners (1): 1982
- Amateur League
  - Runners-up (1): 1964
- Cortés Championship
  - Winners (2): 1962, 1964

== League and Playoffs Performance ==
(1994–present)

| Season | Position | GP | W | D | L | GF | GA | PTS | Play-offs | Pl. | W | D | L | GS | GA | PTS |
|---|---|---|---|---|---|---|---|---|---|---|---|---|---|---|---|---|
| 1994–95 | 8th | 27 | 5 | 10 | 12 | 18 | 28 | 25 | did not qualify | - | - | - | - | - | - | - |
| 1995–96 | 4th | 27 | 10 | 7 | 10 | 29 | 31 | 37 | First round | 2 | 1 | 0 | 1 | 2 | 3 | 3 |
| 1996–97 | 3rd | 27 | 13 | 8 | 6 | 28 | 20 | 34 | Runners-up | 8 | 4 | 2 | 2 | 13 | 10 | 14 |
| 1997–98 Apertura | 1st | 20 | 12 | 2 | 6 | 42 | 26 | 38 | Semi-finals | 4 | 0 | 3 | 1 | 3 | 5 | 3 |
| 1997–98 Clausura | 3rd | 20 | 8 | 8 | 4 | 36 | 30 | 32 | Semi-finals | 4 | 0 | 3 | 1 | 5 | 6 | 3 |
| 1998–99 | 6th | 18 | 7 | 4 | 7 | 23 | 31 | 25 | First round | 2 | 0 | 1 | 1 | 0 | 3 | 1 |
| 1999-00 Apertura | 5th | 18 | 6 | 7 | 5 | 24 | 24 | 25 | First round | 2 | 0 | 2 | 0 | 2 | 2 | 2 |
| 1999-00 Clausura | 2nd | 18 | 10 | 4 | 4 | 39 | 21 | 34 | First round | 2 | 0 | 1 | 1 | 1 | 2 | 1 |
| 2000–01 Apertura | 3rd | 18 | 7 | 7 | 4 | 30 | 21 | 28 | Runners-up | 6 | 1 | 3 | 2 | 6 | 6 | 6 |
| 2000–01 Clausura | 2nd | 18 | 11 | 4 | 3 | 26 | 13 | 37 | Champions | 6 | 3 | 2 | 1 | 9 | 6 | 11 |
| 2001–02 Apertura | 2nd | 18 | 7 | 6 | 5 | 16 | 14 | 27 | Semi-finals | 2 | 0 | 1 | 1 | 2 | 3 | 1 |
| 2001–02 Clausura | 3rd | 18 | 9 | 4 | 5 | 35 | 25 | 28 | Semi-finals | 2 | 0 | 1 | 1 | 1 | 2 | 1 |
| 2002–03 Apertura | 1st | 18 | 12 | 5 | 1 | 42 | 14 | 41 | Runners-up | 4 | 1 | 1 | 2 | 4 | 4 | 4 |
| 2002–03 Clausura | 6th | 18 | 4 | 8 | 6 | 18 | 20 | 20 | did not qualify | - | - | - | - | - | - | - |
| 2003–04 Apertura | 6th | 18 | 5 | 7 | 6 | 20 | 23 | 22 | did not qualify | - | - | - | - | - | - | - |
| 2003–04 Clausura | 6th | 16 | 6 | 2 | 8 | 18 | 22 | 20 | did not qualify | - | - | - | - | - | - | - |
| 2004–05 Apertura | 6th | 18 | 6 | 3 | 9 | 21 | 28 | 21 | did not qualify | - | - | - | - | - | - | - |
| 2004–05 Clausura | 6th | 17 | 5 | 6 | 6 | 23 | 19 | 21 | did not qualify | - | - | - | - | - | - | - |
| 2005–06 Apertura | 4th | 18 | 8 | 3 | 7 | 28 | 34 | 27 | Semi-finals | 2 | 1 | 0 | 1 | 1 | 2 | 3 |
| 2005–06 Clausura | 7th | 18 | 5 | 7 | 6 | 19 | 21 | 22 | did not qualify | - | - | - | - | - | - | - |
| 2006–07 Apertura | 5th | 18 | 7 | 8 | 3 | 32 | 29 | 29 | did not qualify | - | - | - | - | - | - | - |
| 2006–07 Clausura | 6th | 17 | 7 | 2 | 8 | 17 | 22 | 23 | did not qualify | - | - | - | - | - | - | - |
| 2007–08 Apertura | 9th | 18 | 3 | 6 | 9 | 17 | 28 | 15 | did not qualify | - | - | - | - | - | - | - |
| 2007–08 Clausura | 8th | 18 | 5 | 5 | 8 | 18 | 24 | 20 | did not qualify | - | - | - | - | - | - | - |
| 2008–09 Apertura | 7th | 18 | 6 | 5 | 7 | 22 | 26 | 23 | did not qualify | - | - | - | - | - | - | - |
| 2008–09 Clausura | 9th | 17 | 4 | 6 | 7 | 20 | 26 | 18 | did not qualify | - | - | - | - | - | - | - |
| 2009–10 Apertura | 6th | 18 | 6 | 6 | 6 | 23 | 25 | 24 | did not qualify | - | - | - | - | - | - | - |
| 2009–10 Clausura | 4th | 18 | 7 | 7 | 4 | 23 | 19 | 28 | Semi-finals | 2 | 0 | 2 | 0 | 2 | 2 | 2 |
| 2010–11 Apertura | 5th | 18 | 8 | 2 | 8 | 20 | 22 | 26 | did not qualify | - | - | - | - | - | - | - |
| 2010–11 Clausura | 9th | 18 | 4 | 5 | 9 | 21 | 29 | 17 | did not qualify | - | - | - | - | - | - | - |
| 2011–12 Apertura | 8th | 18 | 6 | 3 | 9 | 14 | 23 | 21 | did not qualify | - | - | - | - | - | - | - |
| 2011–12 Clausura | 10th | 18 | 1 | 8 | 9 | 14 | 32 | 11 | did not qualify | - | - | - | - | - | - | - |
| 2012–13 Apertura | 8th | 18 | 4 | 8 | 6 | 15 | 22 | 20 | did not qualify | - | - | - | - | - | - | - |
| 2012–13 Clausura | 5th | 18 | 7 | 3 | 8 | 21 | 24 | 24 | Semi-finals | 4 | 1 | 3 | 0 | 4 | 2 | 6 |

=== All-Time Table ===
(From 1965 to 1966 to 2007–08)

| Seasons | Points | Played | Won | Drawn | Lost | For | Against | Difference |
| 42 | 1637 | 1269 | 394 | 455 | 420 | 1409 | 1415 | -6 |

=== 36 Game Average ===
| Points | Won | Drawn | Lost | For | Against | Difference |
| 46 | 11 | 13 | 12 | 41 | 40 | +1 |

== International competition ==
- 1998 CONCACAF Champions' Cup

First Round v. (Guatemala) Aurora – 2:1
First Round v. (Guatemala) Aurora – 2:1
First Round v. (Belize) Real Verdes – 0:0
First Round v. (Belize) Real Verdes – 6:0
First Round v. (El Salvador) Luis Ángel Firpo – 0:1
Second Round v. (Costa Rica) Saprissa – 1:3
Second Round v. (Guatemala) Comunicaciones – 3:1
Second Round v. (Costa Rica) Saprissa – 0:0
Second Round v. (Guatemala) Comunicaciones – 1:2

=== CONCACAF Cup Winners Cup ===
- 1997 CONCACAF Cup Winners Cup

First Round v. (Belize) Juventus – 0:1, 4:1 (Platense advance 4:2 on aggregate)
Second Round v. (Curaçao) CRKSV Jong Colombia – 3:1, 7:0 (Platense advance 10:1 on aggregate)
Final Round v. (Honduras) Olimpia – 3:3
Final Round v. (Guatemala) Municipal – 0:0

== Current squad ==
As of 12 April, 2026

Note: Flags indicate national team as defined under FIFA eligibility rules; some limited exceptions apply. Players may hold more than one non-FIFA nationality.

| No. | Pos. | Nation | Player |
|---|---|---|---|
| 1 | GK | HON | Merlin Bonilla |
| 2 | DF | HON | Jesús Mena |
| 3 | DF | HON | Elías García |
| 5 | MF | HON | Moisés Rodríguez |
| 6 | MF | HON | Jeferson Castillo |
| 7 | MF | HON | Rembrandt Flores |
| 8 | MF | HON | Yoel Castillo |
| 10 | FW | HON | Erick Puerto |
| 11 | MF | HON | Ilce Barahona |
| 12 | FW | HON | Georgie Welcome |
| 13 | FW | HON | Daniel Carter |
| 14 | FW | HON | Eduardo Urbina |
| 15 | DF | HON | Ofir Padilla |
| 16 | MF | HON | Marco Reyes |
| 17 | MF | HON | Everest Correa |
| 18 | GK | COL | Javier Orobio |

| No. | Pos. | Nation | Player |
|---|---|---|---|
| 19 | DF | ARG | Carlos López |
| 20 | MF | HON | Heber Núñez |
| 21 | DF | HON | Brandon Santos |
| 22 | MF | HON | Alexander Aguilar |
| 23 | MF | HON | Manuel Salinas |
| 24 | DF | HON | Pavel Jhonson |
| 25 | DF | HON | Samuel Pozantes |
| 26 | MF | HON | Carlos Castellanos |
| 27 | MF | HON | Sebastián Espinoza |
| 28 | GK | HON | Sandro Cárcamo |
| 29 | FW | HON | Cesar Canales |
| 30 | FW | HON | Edwin Solano |
| 31 | FW | HON | Angelo Norales |
| 33 | MF | HON | Alexander Álvarez |
| 34 | FW | HON | Yeison Arriola |
| 57 | MF | HON | Yeiron Arzú |

== Coaches ==
- (Peru) Jaime Hormazábal
- (Honduras) Carlos "Zorro" Padilla (1965–67), (the coach when the team won its first championship)
- (Guatemala) Haroldo Cordon (1981–1982)
- (Argentina) Roberto Scalessi (1977)
- (Argentina) Alberto Romero (1996)
- (Uruguay) Ariel Sena (1996–97)
- (Argentina) Jorge Dubanced (1997-98)
- (Honduras) Carlos "Zorro" Padilla (1998–99)
- (Honduras) Chelato Uclés (1999–01)
- (Argentina) Alberto Romero (2001–03), (the coach when the team won its second championship)
- (Brazil) Flavio Ortega (2005)
- (Argentina) Roque Alfaro (2006)
- (Argentina) Héctor Vargas (2006–07)
- (Argentina) Alberto Romero (2007)
- (Argentina) Roque Alfaro (2007–08)
- (Honduras) Nahúm Espinoza (2008–09)
- (Honduras) Rubén Guifarro (Feb 2009 – May 2009)
- (Argentina) Héctor Vargas (2009–11)
- (Colombia) Jairo Ríos (2011)
- (Argentina) Carlos de Toro (2011)
- (Argentina) Roque Alfaro (2011–12)
- (Argentina) Alberto Romero (2012)
- (Honduras) Hernán García (2012–13)
- (Uruguay) Germando Adinolfi (2013–1?)
- (Honduras) Guillermo Bernárdez (2013–14)
- (Honduras) Carlos Martínez (2014–15)
- (Honduras) Carlos Ramón Tábora (February 2015–1?)
- (Uruguay) Ricardo Ortiz (June 2015 – September 2015)
- (Honduras) Guillermo Bernárdez (September 2015–)
- (Uruguay) Ariel Sena (January 2016 - June 2016)
- (Honduras) Reynaldo Clavasquín (June 2016 - October 2017)
- (Colombia) Jairo Ríos (2017–2018)
- (Honduras) Carlos Martínez (2018–2019)
- (Honduras) Carlos Caballero (2019)
- (Panama) Anthony Torres (2019)
- (Honduras) Héctor Castellón (2019)
- (Honduras) Guillermo Bernárdez (2019–2020)
- (Honduras) Nicolás Suazo (2020)
- (Colombia) Jhon Jairo López (2020–2021)
- (Honduras) Nicolás Suazo (2021)
- (Honduras) Ramon Maradiaga (2021–2022)
- (Uruguay) Augusto Camejo (2022–2023)
- (Honduras) Rommel Salgado (2023)
- (Uruguay) Fernando Araújo (2023)
- (Honduras) Carlos Raúl Cáceres (2023- "Present")

== All time top goal scorers ==
| # | Player | Goals |
|---|---|---|
| 1 | (Honduras) Juan Manuel Cárcamo | 65 |
| 2 | (Honduras) Francisco Ramírez | 54 |
| 3 | (Honduras) Raúl Centeno Gamboa | 53 |
| 4 | (Honduras) Julio César de León | 53 |
| 5 | (Honduras) Eduardo Laing | 45 |
| 6 | (Colombia) Oscar Piedrahíta | 33 |
| 7 | (Brazil) Marcelo Ferreira | 28 |
| 8 | (Honduras) Carlos "Care" Alvarado | 27 |
| 9 | (Honduras) Dennis Caballero | 26 |
| 10 | (Honduras) Erick "Yio" Puerto | 25 |
