= 2012–13 Honduran Liga Nacional =

Liga Nacional
- Season: 2012–13
- Champions: Apertura: Olimpia; Clausura: Olimpia
- Relegated: Atlético Choloma
- Champions League: Olimpia; Victoria
- Matches: 200
- Goals: 489 (2.45 per match)
- Top goalscorer: Apertura: Rojas (10); Clausura: Martínez (12)
- Biggest home win: Motagua 6–0 Deportes Savio (6 March 2013)
- Biggest away win: Real España 1–4 Motagua (16 November 2012)
- Highest scoring: Victoria 4–3 Real España (24 February 2013)
- Longest unbeaten run: Olimpia (13)
- Longest losing run: Marathón (4); Real Sociedad (4); Vida (4)
- All statistics correct as of 19 May 2013.

The 2012–13 football season was the 47th Honduran Liga Nacional edition, since its establishment in 1965. The season was divided into two tournaments (Apertura and Clausura) and determined the 61st and 62nd national champions. The campaign began on 28 July 2012, and ended in May 2013. Club Deportivo Olimpia was the reigning champions after winning in 2011–12.

== 2012–13 teams ==
On 3 June 2012, C.D. Real Sociedad obtained the promotion to the Liga Nacional as winner of the 2011–12 Liga de Ascenso. Platense F.C. which had been relegated last season, bought C.D. Necaxa's franchise and will play in first division.

Location of teams in 2012–13 season
- Atlético Choloma
- Deportes Savio
- C.D. Marathón
- C.D. Motagua
- C.D. Olimpia
- Platense F.C.
- Real C.D. España
- C.D. Real Sociedad
- C.D. Victoria
- C.D.S. Vida

Atlético Choloma	Deportes Savio	Marathón	Motagua	Olimpia
Platense	Real España	Real Sociedad	Victoria	Vida

== Apertura ==
The fixtures for the Apertura tournament were announced on 4 July; with the results Real C.D. España 1–0 C.D. Real Sociedad and Atlético Choloma 4–2 C.D.S. Vida, the tournament opened fire on 28 July. On rounds 2 and 3, Vida included midfielder Luis Jaramillo on their lineups despite being ineligible to play; on 12 September, the Northern Disciplinary Commission made the decision to award both matches to Real España and Victoria 3–0.

On 28 October, Club Deportivo Olimpia became the first team to secure a spot for the postseason, after defeating Platense F.C. 0–1 at Estadio Excélsior in Puerto Cortés. C.D. Victoria also qualified along Olimpia directly to the semifinals finishing second. On the other hand, C.D. Motagua–Real España and C.D. Marathón–Atlético Choloma had to play a playoff round.

The semifinal encounters were settled on 21 November, as Motagua and Atlético Choloma defeated Real España and Marathón respectively. Motagua crushed Real España with a 7–3 on aggregate. Meanwhile, Atlético Choloma dispatched Marathón after a 2–2 aggregated score but with more away goals scored.

Once in the semifinals, Olimpia got rid of Atlético Choloma with a 2–1 aggregate, meanwhile Victoria and Motagua finished with a 3–3 global score, however, Victoria advanced thanks to a better regular season finish over Motagua. With their success in the semifinals, Olimpia and Victoria re-encountered each other in a final for the third time in history, having won one each in the previous two. The first match in La Ceiba ended with a scoreless tie; but in the second leg, Olimpia had no mercy over Victoria and won its third consecutive title with an overwhelming 4–0.

=== Regular season ===
==== Standings ====
Pos	Team	Pld	W	D	L	GF	GA	GD	Pts	Qualification or relegation
1	Olimpia	18	11	6	1	32	10	+22	39	Qualification to the Semifinals
2	Victoria	18	8	7	3	22	12	+10	31	Qualification to the Semifinals
3	Motagua	18	6	8	4	21	15	+6	26	Qualification to the Second round
4	Marathón	18	6	5	7	21	26	−5	23	Qualification to the Second round
5	Atlético Choloma	18	5	7	6	29	28	+1	22	Qualification to the Second round
6	Real España	18	5	6	7	21	22	−1	21	Qualification to the Second round
7	Vida	18	5	6	7	24	35	−11	21	
8	Platense	18	4	8	6	15	22	−7	20	
9	Deportes Savio	18	5	4	9	16	23	−7	19	
10	Real Sociedad	18	4	5	9	13	21	−8	17	

Updated to match(es) played on 11 November 2012. Source:

==== Results ====
As of 11 November 2012

Home \ Away	ACH	SAV	MAR	MOT	OLI	PLA	RES	RSO	VIC	VID
Atlético Choloma		2–1	2–2	1–2	0–0	5–1	2–2	3–1	1–1	4–2
Deportes Savio	2–1		1–0	0–1	1–2	1–1	1–0	0–0	0–1	2–1
Marathón	1–2	1–0		1–1	1–0	2–0	2–2	1–2	0–0	4–1
Motagua	0–0	1–1	4–0		2–2	2–0	1–1	2–0	1–0	0–0
Olimpia	4–1	3–1	4–0	2–0		1–1	1–0	1–0	3–0	3–0
Platense	0–0	4–2	1–0	0–0	0–1		1–0	3–2	1–3	1–1
Real España	3–1	1–1	2–3	1–0	0–0	1–1		1–0	1–0	2–4
Real Sociedad	2–1	0–1	0–1	2–1	0–0	0–0	1–0		0–2	2–2
Victoria	1–1	2–0	2–0	2–1	2–2	0–0	3–1	0–0		3–0
Vida	3–2	2–1	2–2	2–2	1–3	1–0	0–3	2–1	0–0	

Source: Soccerway
Legend: Blue = home team win; Yellow = draw; Red = away team win.
- Originally Vida 1–0 Real España and Victoria 1–2 Vida. Due to the illegal participation of Vida's midfielder Luis Jaramillo in both matches, Real España and Victoria were granted each a 3–0 win.

=== Final round ===
==== Second round ====
===== Motagua vs Real España =====
16 November 2012
19:00 (UTC−06:00)
1st leg

Real España	1–4	Motagua
Lobo 38'	Report	Guevara 4'; Molina 17'; Welcome 23'; Medina 56'

Estadio Olímpico Metropolitano
San Pedro Sula, Cortés
Attendance: 7,666
Referee: Armando Castro

Real España	Motagua

GK	22	(Uruguay) Marcelo Macías	Yellow card
DF	4	(Honduras) Hilder Colón	Yellow card	(red card) 72'
DF	5	(Honduras) Wilfredo Barahona
DF	14	(Honduras) Ever Alvarado
DF	21	(Honduras) Daniel Tejeda
DF	–	(Honduras) Víctor Mena	(substituted off) 46'
MF	23	(Honduras) Edder Delgado
FW	6	(Honduras) Jairo Puerto	Yellow card	(substituted off) 64'
FW	11	(Honduras) Luis Lobo
FW	17	(Honduras) Allan Lalín	(substituted off) 52'
FW	20	(Argentina) Jonatan Hansen	Yellow card
Substitutions:
MF	12	(Honduras) Gerson Rodas	(substituted on) 46'
FW	–	(Honduras) Franco Güity	(substituted on) 52'
FW	–	(Honduras) Walter Martínez	(substituted on) 64'
Manager:
(Honduras) Nahúm Espinoza

GK	22	(Honduras) Donaldo Morales
DF	2	(Honduras) Odis Borjas
DF	4	(Honduras) Júnior Izaguirre
DF	5	(Honduras) David Molina
MF	6	(Honduras) Emilson Cruz	(substituted off) 66'
MF	11	(Honduras) Melvin Valladares
MF	13	(Honduras) Nery Medina	(substituted off) 71'
MF	19	(Honduras) César Oseguera	Yellow card
MF	20	(Honduras) Amado Guevara
MF	24	(Honduras) Omar Elvir
FW	9	(Honduras) Georgie Welcome	(substituted off) 46'
Substitutions:
FW	10	(Brazil) Jocimar Nascimento	(substituted on) 46'
MF	29	(Honduras) Marvin Barrios	(substituted on) 66'
MF	7	(Honduras) Carlos Discua	(substituted on) 71'
Manager:
(Honduras) José Clavasquín

21 November 2012
19:30 (UTC−06:00)
2nd leg

Motagua	3–2	Real España
Valladares 7'; Welcome 30' (pen.); Medina 76'	Report	Rodas 47'; Alvarado 50'

Estadio Tiburcio Carías Andino
Tegucigalpa, Francisco Morazán
Attendance: 2,982
Referee: Melvin Matamoros

Motagua	Real España

GK	22	(Honduras) Donaldo Morales
DF	2	(Honduras) Odis Borjas
DF	4	(Honduras) Júnior Izaguirre
DF	5	(Honduras) David Molina
MF	6	(Honduras) Emilson Cruz
MF	7	(Honduras) Carlos Discua
MF	11	(Honduras) Melvin Valladares	(substituted off) 68'
MF	13	(Honduras) Nery Medina	Yellow card
MF	20	(Honduras) Amado Guevara	Substituted off
MF	24	(Honduras) Omar Elvir
FW	9	(Honduras) Georgie Welcome	(substituted off) 57'
Substitutions:
FW	10	(Brazil) Jocimar Nascimento	(substituted on) 57'
MF	8	(Honduras) Carlos Morán	(substituted on) 68'
MF	32	(Honduras) Ronald Martínez	Substituted on
Manager:
(Honduras) José Clavasquín

GK	31	(Honduras) José Zúniga
DF	5	(Honduras) Wilfredo Barahona	Yellow card
DF	14	(Honduras) Ever Alvarado
DF	21	(Honduras) Daniel Tejeda
DF	29	(Uruguay) Sergio Bica	Yellow card
MF	12	(Honduras) Gerson Rodas
MF	16	(Honduras) Juan Acevedo
MF	23	(Honduras) Edder Delgado
FW	6	(Honduras) Jairo Puerto
FW	17	(Honduras) Allan Lalín	(substituted off) 59'
FW	–	(Honduras) Franco Güity	(substituted off) 64'
Substitutions:
FW	–	(Honduras) Walter Martínez	(substituted on) 59'
FW	20	(Argentina) Jonatan Hansen	(substituted on) 64'
Manager:
(Honduras) Nahúm Espinoza

- Motagua won 7–3 on aggregate score.

===== Marathón vs Atlético Choloma =====
16 November 2012
19:30 (UTC−06:00)
1st leg

Atlético Choloma	0–0	Marathón
	Report

Estadio Rubén Deras
Choloma, Cortés
Attendance: 411
Referee: Orlando Hernández

Atlético Choloma	Marathón

GK	25	(Honduras) Ricardo Canales
DF	4	(Honduras) Luis Santamaría
DF	15	(Honduras) Johnny Barrios
DF	26	(Honduras) Roy Posas
MF	8	(Honduras) Mauricio Castro
MF	10	(Honduras) Alex Andino
MF	13	(Honduras) Aldo Oviedo	(substituted off) 69'
MF	14	(Honduras) Orvin Paz
MF	20	(Honduras) Leonardo Isaula	(substituted off) 89'
FW	10	(Colombia) Charles Córdoba	(substituted off) 85'
FW	28	(Uruguay) Óscar Torlacoff
Substitutions:
FW	–	(Honduras) Osman Hernández	(substituted on) 69'
FW	9	(Honduras) Félix Álvarez	(substituted on) 85'
DF	6	(Honduras) Elder Valladares	(substituted on) 89'
Manager:
(Honduras) Edwin Pavón

GK	1	(Belize) Shane Orio
DF	5	(Colombia) Luis Castro	Yellow card
DF	20	(Honduras) Mario Beata	(substituted off) 57'
DF	23	(Honduras) Mauricio Sabillón
MF	6	(Honduras) David Meza
MF	8	(Honduras) Reinieri Mayorquín	Yellow card
MF	12	(Honduras) Mariano Acevedo
MF	13	(Honduras) Julián Rápalo	(substituted off) 77'
MF	19	(Honduras) Mario Berríos
FW	9	(Honduras) Rony Flores	(substituted off) 68'
FW	18	(Belize) Harrison Róches
Substitutions:
DF	2	(Honduras) Pastor Martínez	(substituted on) 57'
FW	25	(Honduras) Jonathan Reyes	(substituted on) 68'
MF	7	(Honduras) Alexander Aguilar	(substituted on) 77'
Manager:
(Uruguay) Manuel Keosseián

21 November 2012
19:30 (UTC−06:00)
2nd leg

Marathón	2–2	Atlético Choloma
Berríos 45' (pen.) 90'	Report	Oviedo 60'; Hernández 70'

Estadio Yankel Rosenthal
San Pedro Sula, Cortés
Attendance: 808
Referee: Raúl Castro

Marathón	Atlético Choloma

GK	1	(Honduras) José Mendoza
DF	5	(Colombia) Luis Castro
DF	22	(Honduras) Quiarol Arzú	Yellow card
DF	23	(Honduras) Mauricio Sabillón
MF	6	(Honduras) David Meza	(substituted off) 75'
MF	12	(Honduras) Mariano Acevedo
MF	17	(Honduras) Wilmer Fuentes
MF	19	(Honduras) Mario Berrios
MF	51	(Honduras) Kevin Espinoza	(substituted off) 67'
FW	15	(Honduras) Marco Vega	(substituted off) 75'
FW	33	(Honduras) Mitchel Brown
Substitutions:
MF	7	(Honduras) Alexander Aguilar	(substituted on) 67'
FW	18	(Belize) Harrison Róches	(substituted on) 75'
FW	25	(Honduras) Jonathan Reyes	(substituted on) 75'
Manager:
(Uruguay) Manuel Keosseián

GK	25	(Honduras) Ricardo Canales	Yellow card
DF	4	(Honduras) Luis Santamaría
DF	5	(Honduras) Luis Guzmán	Yellow card
DF	15	(Honduras) Johnny Barrios
DF	26	(Honduras) Roy Posas
MF	8	(Honduras) Mauricio Castro
MF	13	(Honduras) Aldo Oviedo	(substituted off) 84'
MF	14	(Honduras) Orvin Paz	(substituted off) 79'
MF	20	(Honduras) Leonardo Isaula
FW	10	(Colombia) Charles Córdoba	Yellow card
FW	28	(Uruguay) Óscar Torlacoff	(substituted off) 64'
Substitutions:
FW	–	(Honduras) Osman Hernández	(substituted on) 64'
MF	10	(Honduras) Alex Andino	(substituted on) 79'
MF	16	(Honduras) Marvin Sánchez	(substituted on) 84'
Manager:
(Honduras) Edwin Pavón

- Marathón 2–2 Atlético Choloma on aggregate score; Atlético Choloma advanced on away goals.

==== Semifinals ====
===== Olimpia vs Atlético Choloma =====
25 November 2012
17:00 (UTC−06:00)
1st leg

Atlético Choloma	1–0	Olimpia
Isaula 34'	Report

Estadio Rubén Deras
Choloma, Cortés
Referee: Armando Castro

Atlético Choloma	Olimpia

GK	25	(Honduras) Ricardo Canales
DF	4	(Honduras) Luis Santamaría
DF	5	(Honduras) Luis Guzmán	(yellow card) 80'
DF	15	(Honduras) Johnny Barrios
DF	26	(Honduras) Roy Posas
MF	8	(Honduras) Mauricio Castro	(yellow card) 35'
MF	13	(Honduras) Aldo Oviedo
MF	14	(Honduras) Orvin Paz
MF	20	(Honduras) Leonardo Isaula	(substituted off) 66'
FW	10	(Colombia) Charles Córdoba	(substituted off) 89'
FW	28	(Uruguay) Óscar Torlacoff	(substituted off) 73'
Substitutions:
FW	–	(Honduras) Osman Hernández	(substituted on) 66'
DF	6	(Honduras) Elder Valladares	(substituted on) 73'
FW	9	(Honduras) Félix Álvarez	(substituted on) 89'
Manager:
(Honduras) Edwin Pavón

GK	28	(Honduras) Donis Escober
DF	3	(Honduras) Henry Bermúdez
DF	4	(Brazil) Fábio de Souza	(yellow card) 72'
DF	13	(Honduras) Luis Garrido
DF	30	(Honduras) Johnny Palacios
MF	7	(Honduras) Carlos Mejía	(yellow card) 40'	(substituted off) 78'
MF	8	(Honduras) Reynaldo Tilguath	(substituted off) 67'
MF	15	(Uruguay) Sebastián Rosano
MF	25	(Honduras) Javier Portillo
FW	18	(Brazil) Douglas Caetano	(yellow card) 35'
FW	33	(Uruguay) Ramiro Bruschi	(yellow card) 59'	(substituted off) 70'
Substitutions:
DF	5	(Honduras) Brayan Beckeles	(substituted on) 67'
FW	21	(Honduras) Roger Rojas	(substituted on) 70'
DF	20	(Honduras) Irvin Reyna	(substituted on) 78'
Manager:
(Argentina) Danilo Tosello

2 December 2012
16:00 (UTC−06:00)
2nd leg

Olimpia	2–0	Atlético Choloma
Caetano 33'; Palacios 75'	Report

Estadio Tiburcio Carías Andino
Tegucigalpa, Francisco Morazán

Olimpia	Atlético Choloma

GK	27	(Honduras) Noel Valladares
DF	4	(Brazil) Fábio de Souza
DF	5	(Honduras) Brayan Beckeles
DF	13	(Honduras) Luis Garrido
DF	30	(Honduras) Johnny Palacios
MF	8	(Honduras) Reynaldo Tilguath	(substituted off) 53'
MF	15	(Argentina) Sebastián Rosano
MF	16	(Honduras) Alexander López	(substituted off) 86'
MF	25	(Honduras) Javier Portillo
FW	18	(Brazil) Douglas Caetano
FW	21	(Honduras) Roger Rojas	(substituted off) 69'
Substitutions:
DF	–	(Honduras) Hendry Córdova	(substituted on) 53'
FW	33	(Uruguay) Ramiro Bruschi	(substituted on) 69'
DF	3	(Honduras) Henry Bermúdez	(substituted on) 86'
Manager:
(Argentina) Danilo Tosello

GK	25	(Honduras) Ricardo Canales
DF	4	(Honduras) Luis Santamaria
DF	5	(Honduras) Luis Guzmán
DF	15	(Honduras) Johnny Barrios
DF	26	(Honduras) Roy Posas
MF	8	(Honduras) Mauricio Castro
MF	13	(Honduras) Aldo Oviedo
MF	14	(Honduras) Orvin Paz	(substituted off) 70'
MF	20	(Honduras) Leonardo Isaula	(substituted off) 60'
FW	10	(Colombia) Charles Córdoba
FW	–	(Honduras) Osman Hernández
Substitutions:
FW	28	(Uruguay) Óscar Torlacoff	(substituted on) 60'
MF	10	(Honduras) Alex Andino	(substituted on) 70'
–	–	–
Manager:
(Honduras) Edwin Pavón

- Olimpia won 2–1 on aggregate score.

===== Victoria vs Motagua =====
25 November 2012
16:00 (UTC−06:00)
1st leg

Motagua	1–1	Victoria
Medina 31'	Report	Arias 57'

Estadio Tiburcio Carías Andino
Tegucigalpa, Francisco Morazán
Attendance: 9,533
Referee: Erick Andino

Motagua	Victoria

GK	22	(Honduras) Donaldo Morales
DF	2	(Honduras) Odis Borjas
DF	4	(Honduras) Júnior Izaguirre
DF	5	(Honduras) David Molina
DF	6	(Honduras) Emilson Cruz	(yellow card) 60'
MF	7	(Honduras) Carlos Discua	(substituted off) 37'
MF	11	(Honduras) Melvin Valladares	(red card) 17'
MF	13	(Honduras) Nery Medina	(yellow card) 82'
MF	20	(Honduras) Amado Guevara
MF	24	(Honduras) Omar Elvir	(substituted off) 60'
FW	9	(Honduras) Georgie Welcome	(yellow card) 60'	(substituted off) 55'
Substitutions:
MF	19	(Honduras) César Oseguera	(substituted on) 37'
FW	23	(Honduras) Eddie Hernández	(substituted on) 55'
DF	16	(Honduras) Johnny Leverón	(substituted on) 60'
Manager:
(Honduras) José Clavasquín

GK	1	(Honduras) Orlin Vallecillo
DF	5	(Honduras) José Velásquez
DF	6	(Colombia) Edder Arias
DF	13	(Honduras) Rommel Murillo
DF	27	(Honduras) Félix Crisanto	(substituted off) 50'
MF	8	(Honduras) Miguel Castillo	(yellow card) 17'
MF	19	(Honduras) Jairo Róchez	(substituted off) 37'
MF	26	(Honduras) Rigoberto Padilla	(yellow card) 23'	(substituted off) 65'
MF	25	(Honduras) Wilmer Crisanto	(yellow card) 30'
FW	11	(Honduras) Rubén Licona
FW	24	(Colombia) Andrés Copete
Substitutions:
FW	4	(Argentina) Mario Romero	(substituted on) 37'
FW	9	(Honduras) Víctor Ortiz	(substituted on) 50'
MF	16	(Honduras) Héctor Castellanos	(substituted on) 65'	Yellow card
Manager:
(Argentina) Héctor Vargas

2 December 2012
14:00 (UTC−06:00)
2nd leg

Victoria	2–2	Motagua
Licona 34'; Molina 75'	Report	Medina 2'; Oseguera 60'

Estadio Nilmo Edwards
La Ceiba, Atlántida
Attendance: 7,338
Referee: Héctor Rodríguez

Victoria	Motagua

GK	1	(Honduras) Orlin Vallecillo
DF	5	(Honduras) José Velásquez
DF	6	(Colombia) Edder Arias
DF	13	(Honduras) Rommel Murillo	(yellow card) 29'
MF	8	(Honduras) Miguel Castillo
MF	15	(Honduras) Eliud Membreño	(substituted off) 27'
MF	25	(Honduras) Wilmer Crisanto
MF	26	(Honduras) Rigoberto Padilla	(yellow card) 20'
FW	9	(Honduras) Víctor Ortiz
FW	11	(Honduras) Rubén Licona
FW	24	(Colombia) Andrés Copete
Substitutions:
FW	4	(Argentina) Mario Romero	(substituted on) 27'
–	–	–
–	–	–
Manager:
(Argentina) Héctor Vargas

GK	22	(Honduras) Donaldo Morales
DF	2	(Honduras) Odis Borjas
DF	4	(Honduras) Júnior Izaguirre	(substituted off) 78'
DF	5	(Honduras) David Molina
DF	6	(Honduras) Emilson Cruz	(substituted off) 46'
MF	13	(Honduras) Nery Medina
MF	19	(Honduras) César Oseguera
MF	20	(Honduras) Amado Guevara
MF	24	(Honduras) Omar Elvir	(substituted off) 72'
MF	29	(Honduras) Marvin Barrios
FW	11	(Honduras) Georgie Welcome
Substitutions:
MF	8	(Honduras) Carlos Morán	(substituted on) 46'
FW	23	(Honduras) Eddie Hernández	(substituted on) 72'
FW	14	(Honduras) Roby Norales	(substituted on) 78'
Manager:
(Honduras) José Clavasquín

- Victoria 3–3 Motagua on aggregate score. Victoria advanced on better regular season performance.

==== Final ====
===== Olimpia vs Victoria =====
9 December 2012
14:00 (UTC−06:00)
1st leg

Victoria	0–0	Olimpia
	Report

Estadio Nilmo Edwards
La Ceiba, Atlántida
Attendance: 13,203

Victoria	Olimpia

GK	1	(Honduras) Orlin Vallecillo
DF	5	(Honduras) José Velásquez
DF	6	(Colombia) Edder Arias
DF	13	(Honduras) Rommel Murillo
DF	27	(Honduras) Félix Crisanto	Yellow card	(substituted off) 53'
MF	8	(Honduras) Miguel Castillo
MF	26	(Honduras) Rigoberto Padilla	(substituted off) 80'
MF	25	(Honduras) Wilmer Crisanto
FW	9	(Honduras) Víctor Ortiz	(substituted off) 85'
FW	11	(Honduras) Rubén Licona
FW	24	(Colombia) Andrés Copete	(yellow card) 55'
Substitutions:
FW	4	(Argentina) Mario Romero	(substituted on) 53'
MF	–	(Honduras) Dicktmar Hernández	(substituted on) 80'
FW	19	(Honduras) Jairo Róchez	(substituted on) 85'
Manager:
(Argentina) Héctor Vargas

GK	28	(Honduras) Donis Escober
DF	4	(Brazil) Fábio de Souza
DF	5	(Honduras) Brayan Beckeles
DF	6	(Honduras) Juan García
DF	13	(Honduras) Luis Garrido	(yellow card) 87'
DF	30	(Honduras) Johnny Palacios
MF	8	(Honduras) Reynaldo Tilguath	(substituted off) 67'
MF	15	(Uruguay) Sebastián Rosano	(yellow card) 28'
MF	25	(Honduras) Javier Portillo
FW	18	(Brazil) Douglas Caetano	(substituted off) 71'
FW	33	(Uruguay) Ramiro Bruschi
Substitutions:
MF	16	(Honduras) Alexander López	Substituted on
FW	21	(Honduras) Roger Rojas	(substituted on) 67'
FW	17	(Honduras) Juan Mejía	(substituted on) 71'
Manager:
(Argentina) Danilo Tosello

16 December 2012
16:00 (UTC−06:00)
2nd leg

Olimpia	4–0	Victoria
Rojas 2'; García 13'; Portillo 45'; Bruschi 85'	Report

Estadio Tiburcio Carías Andino
Tegucigalpa, Francisco Morazán
Referee: Héctor Rodríguez

Olimpia	Victoria

GK	28	(Honduras) Donis Escober
DF	4	(Brazil) Fábio de Souza
DF	5	(Honduras) Brayan Beckeles
DF	6	(Honduras) Juan García
DF	13	(Honduras) Luis Garrido
DF	30	(Honduras) Johnny Palacios	(yellow card) 77'
MF	8	(Honduras) Reynaldo Tilguath	(substituted off) 71'
MF	15	(Uruguay) Sebastián Rosano
MF	25	(Honduras) Javier Portillo
FW	18	(Brazil) Douglas Caetano	(substituted off) 80'
FW	21	(Honduras) Roger Rojas	(substituted off) 65'
Substitutions:
FW	33	(Uruguay) Ramiro Bruschi	(substituted on) 65'
DF	23	(Honduras) Hendry Córdova	(substituted on) 71'
FW	17	(Honduras) Juan Mejía	(substituted on) 80'
Manager:
(Argentina) Danilo Tosello

GK	1	(Honduras) Orlin Vallecillo
DF	5	(Honduras) José Velásquez
DF	6	(Colombia) Edder Arias
DF	13	(Honduras) Rommel Murillo
MF	8	(Honduras) Miguel Castillo	(yellow card) 22'
MF	16	(Honduras) Héctor Castellanos	(substituted off) 17'
MF	26	(Honduras) Rigoberto Padilla	(yellow card) 62'	(substituted off) 67'
MF	25	(Honduras) Wilmer Crisanto
FW	4	(Argentina) Mario Romero
FW	11	(Honduras) Rubén Licona	(substituted off) 57'
FW	24	(Colombia) Andrés Copete
Substitutions:
FW	9	(Honduras) Víctor Ortiz	(substituted on) 17'
MF	27	(Honduras) Félix Crisanto	(substituted on) 57'
FW	14	(Honduras) Júnior Lacayo	(substituted on) 67'	(yellow card) 74'
Manager:
(Argentina) Héctor Vargas

- Olimpia won 4–0 on aggregate score.

Liga Nacional
2012–13 Apertura champion

26th title

=== Top goalscorers ===
As of 16 December 2012

- 10 goals:

(Honduras) Roger Rojas (Olimpia)

- 8 goals:

(Uruguay) Óscar Torlacoff (Atlético Choloma)
(Honduras) Aldo Oviedo (Atlético Choloma)

- 7 goals:

(Colombia) Mauricio Copete (Victoria)
(Argentina) Jonatan Hansen (Real España)

- 5 goals:

(Honduras) Osnaldo Hernández (Real Sociedad)
(Honduras) Shannon Welcome (Vida)
(Honduras) Mitchel Brown (Marathón)
(Honduras) Román Castillo (Deportes Savio)
(Honduras) Elmer Zelaya (Vida)
(Honduras) Osman Hernández (Atlético Choloma)

- 4 goals:

(Honduras) Juan Mejía (Olimpia)
(Honduras) Amado Guevara (Motagua)
(Honduras) Nery Medina (Motagua)
(Honduras) Mario Berríos (Marathón)
(Honduras) Georgie Welcome (Motagua)
(Uruguay) Ramiro Bruschi (Olimpia)
(Honduras) Carlos Discua (Motagua)
(Honduras) Leonardo Isaula (Atlético Choloma)

- 3 goals:

(Belize) Elroy Smith (Vida)
(Colombia) Charles Córdoba (Atlético Choloma)
(Honduras) Carlos Mejía (Olimpia)
(Honduras) Mariano Acevedo (Marathón)
(Uruguay) Julio Rodríguez (Real España)
(Honduras) Johnny Leverón (Motagua)
(Honduras) Rubén Licona (Victoria)
(Honduras) César Oseguera (Motagua)
(Honduras) Víctor Ortiz (Victoria)
(Honduras) Jerry Palacios (Platense)
(Honduras) Marco Vega (Marathón)
(Honduras) Eddie Hernández (Motagua)

- 2 goals:

(Honduras) Ian Osorio (Platense)
(Brazil) Marcelo Souza (Deportes Savio)
(Honduras) Elkin González (Real Sociedad)
(Honduras) Reynaldo Tilguath (Olimpia)
(Honduras) Luis Lobo (Real España)
(Honduras) Melvin Valladares (Motagua)
(Brazil) Douglas Caetano (Olimpia)
(Honduras) Javier Portillo (Olimpia)
(Colombia) Stiven Jiménez (Platense)
(Honduras) Aly Arriola (Deportes Savio)
(Honduras) Carlos Morán (Motagua)
(Honduras) Néstor Martínez (Vida)
(Honduras) Cholby Martínez (Vida)
(Uruguay) Sebastián Rosano (Olimpia)
(Honduras) Ever Alvarado (Real España)
(Honduras) Jorge Lozano (Vida)
(Honduras) Leonardo Benedith (Vida)
(Honduras) Rony Flores (Marathón)
(Honduras) Allan Lalín (Real España)
(Honduras) Jonathan Reyes (Marathón)
(Honduras) Wilmer Crisanto (Victoria)
(Honduras) Juan García (Olimpia)

- 1 goal:

(Honduras) Johnny Barrios (Atlético Choloma)
(Honduras) Marco Mejía (Deportes Savio)
(Honduras) Júnior Sandoval (Marathón)
(Honduras) Bayron Méndez (Platense)
(Honduras) Jairo Puerto (Real España)
(Honduras) Roby Norales (Motagua)
(Honduras) José Meza (Marathón)
(Honduras) John Beaumont (Deportes Savio)
(Honduras) Luis Santamaría (Atlético Choloma)
(Colombia) Luis Castro (Marathón)
(Honduras) José Casildo (Platense)
(Honduras) Edder Delgado (Real España)
(Brazil) Romário Pinto (Deportes Savio)
(Honduras) Alexander López (Olimpia)
(Honduras) Brayan Beckeles (Olimpia)
(Honduras) David Molina (Motagua)
(Colombia) Eder Arias (Victoria)
(Honduras) Johnny Palacios (Olimpia)
(Honduras) Juan Cárcamo (Real Sociedad)
(Honduras) Júnior Lacayo (Victoria)
(Honduras) Selvin Tinoco (Deportes Savio)
(Brazil) Luciano Emílio (Olimpia)
(Honduras) Danilo Turcios (Real Sociedad)
(Honduras) Porciano Ávila (Vida)
(Honduras) Johny Galdámez (Deportes Savio)
(Honduras) Carlos Valle (Real Sociedad)
(Argentina) Mario Romero (Victoria)
(Honduras) Christian Altamirano (Marathón)
(Honduras) Francisco López (Platense)
(Honduras) José Escalante (Olimpia)
(Honduras) Óscar Fortín (Deportes Savio)
(Honduras) Jesús Navas (Vida)
(Honduras) Rony Morales (Platense)
(Honduras) Jorge Campbell (Atlético Choloma)
(Honduras) Jerry Díaz (Platense)
(Honduras) Jorge Cardona (Platense)
(Honduras) Samuel Córdova (Victoria)
(Honduras) Jaime Rosales (Platense)
(Honduras) Salvador Peña (Real Sociedad)
(Honduras) Irvin Reyna (Olimpia)
(Honduras) Félix Crisanto (Victoria)
(Honduras) Marvin Sánchez (Atlético Choloma)
(Honduras) Adán Ramírez (Real Sociedad)
(Honduras) Rigoberto Padilla (Victoria)
(Honduras) Walter Hernández (Platense)
(Honduras) Bryan Castro (Deportes Savio)
(Uruguay) Sergio Bica (Real España)
(Honduras) Chestyn Onofre (Vida)
(Honduras) Rubén Matamoros (Real Sociedad)
(Honduras) Orlin Peralta (Vida)
(Brazil) Ney Costa (Vida)
(Honduras) Hilder Colón (Real España)
(Honduras) Gerson Rodas (Real España)

- 1 own goal:

(Honduras) Porciano Ávila (Vida)
(Honduras) David Molina (Motagua)
(Honduras) Wilson Güity (Atlético Choloma)
(Honduras) Johnny Barrios (Atlético Choloma)

== Clausura ==
The Clausura tournament started on 19 January 2013, the first game was played between locals C.D. Marathón and Platense F.C. at Estadio Yankel Rosenthal. The regular season ended on 20 April 2013. C.D. Olimpia and C.D. Real Sociedad qualified directly to the semifinals after finishing 1st and 2nd respectively. The playoffs were paired with C.D. Victoria facing Deportes Savio and Marathón vs Platense.

=== Regular season ===
==== Standings ====
Pos	Team	Pld	W	D	L	GF	GA	GD	Pts	Qualification or relegation
1	Olimpia	18	9	6	3	26	14	+12	33	Qualification to the Semifinals
2	Real Sociedad	18	8	6	4	23	13	+10	30	Qualification to the Semifinals
3	Victoria	18	6	7	5	24	25	−1	25	Qualification to the Second round
4	Marathón	18	5	9	4	26	21	+5	24	Qualification to the Second round
5	Platense	18	7	3	8	21	24	−3	24	Qualification to the Second round
6	Deportes Savio	18	6	5	7	23	30	−7	23	Qualification to the Second round
7	Motagua	18	6	4	8	27	23	+4	22	
8	Real España	18	5	7	6	18	22	−4	22	
9	Vida	18	4	7	7	17	29	−12	19	
10	Atlético Choloma	18	2	10	6	24	28	−4	16	

Updated to match(es) played on 20 April 2013. Source:

==== Results ====
As of 20 April 2013

Home \ Away	ACH	SAV	MAR	MOT	OLI	PLA	RES	RSO	VIC	VID
Atlético Choloma		3–1	0–0	0–3	2–2	1–1	2–2	1–1	3–3	4–1
Deportes Savio	3–2		2–1	3–2	1–1	3–1	1–0	3–1	0–0	1–1
Marathón	1–1	3–2		5–0	2–1	3–0	0–0	0–0	2–0	1–1
Motagua	1–0	6–0	1–1		2–3	2–1	0–0	0–1	1–1	3–0
Olimpia	2–1	1–1	3–0	1–0		2–0	3–0	0–0	0–1	0–0
Platense	2–0	1–0	3–2	1–0	1–2		1–1	2–0	1–2	1–0
Real España	2–1	1–0	1–1	2–1	2–1	1–1		1–0	1–2	1–1
Real Sociedad	1–1	3–0	1–1	2–0	1–1	0–1	2–0		2–0	3–0
Victoria	0–0	1–1	2–0	2–2	0–1	3–2	4–3	2–3		1–3
Vida	2–2	2–1	3–3	0–3	0–2	2–1	1–0	0–2	0–0	

Source: Soccerway
Legend: Blue = home team win; Yellow = draw; Red = away team win.

=== Final round ===
==== Second round ====
===== Victoria vs Deportes Savio =====
24 April 2013
18:00 (UTC−06:00)
1st leg

Deportes Savio	2–1	Victoria
Minella 45'; Benítez 84'	Report	Lacayo 65'

Estadio Sergio Antonio Reyes
Santa Rosa de Copán, Copán
Attendance: 2,257
Referee: Erick Andino

Deportes Savio	Victoria

GK	28	(Honduras) Gerson Argueta
DF	3	(Honduras) Mario Padilla
DF	8	(Honduras) Óscar Fortin
DF	17	(Honduras) Bryan Castro	(yellow card) 57'
MF	14	(Honduras) Óliver Morazán
MF	16	(Brazil) Romario Pinto	(yellow card) 71'
MF	22	(Honduras) Clayvin Zuniga	(substituted off) 72'
MF	23	(Honduras) Francisco Benítez	(substituted off) 90'
MF	25	(Honduras) Selvin Tinoco
FW	13	(Argentina) Santiago Minella	(substituted off) 72'
FW	–	(Honduras) Luis Ramírez
Substitutions:
FW	–	(Colombia) Geovani Mina	(substituted on) 72'
FW	15	(Honduras) Ángel Pineda	(substituted on) 72'
FW	11	(Honduras) Aly Arriola	(substituted on) 90'
Manager:
(Honduras) Mauro Reyes

GK	1	(Honduras) Orlin Vallecillo
DF	5	(Honduras) José Velásquez
DF	6	(Colombia) Eder Arias
DF	18	(Honduras) Denis Suazo
DF	25	(Honduras) Wilmer Crisanto	(yellow card) 22'	(substituted off) 76'
DF	27	(Honduras) Félix Crisanto
MF	10	(Honduras) Michel Rivera	(substituted off) 55'
FW	11	(Honduras) Rubén Licona
FW	19	(Honduras) Jairo Róchez	(substituted off) 46'
FW	29	(Honduras) Ozzie Bodden
FW	–	(Honduras) Ronald Montoya	(yellow card) 85'
Substitutions:
FW	14	(Honduras) Júnior Lacayo	(substituted on) 46'
FW	9	(Honduras) Víctor Ortiz	(substituted on) 55'
MF	39	(Honduras) Brayan Martínez	(substituted on) 76'
Manager:
(Argentina) Héctor Vargas			Red card

27 April 2013
14:00 (UTC−06:00)
2nd leg

Victoria	2–0	Deportes Savio
Lacayo 57' 64'	Report

Estadio San Jorge
Olanchito, Yoro
Attendance: 640
Referee: Armando Castro

Victoria	Deportes Savio

GK	23	(Honduras) John Bodden
DF	5	(Honduras) José Velásquez	(yellow card) 36'
DF	6	(Colombia) Eder Arias	(yellow card) 10'
DF	25	(Honduras) Wilmer Cisanto
DF	27	(Honduras) Félix Crisanto	(substituted off) 73'
MF	10	(Honduras) Michel Rivera	(yellow card) 65'
FW	9	(Honduras) Víctor Ortiz
FW	11	(Honduras) Rubén Licona	(substituted off) 30'
FW	12	(Honduras) Rubén Rivera
FW	14	(Honduras) Júnior Lacayo
FW	–	(Honduras) Ronald Montoya	(yellow card) 52'	(substituted off) 55'
Substitutions:
FW	29	(Honduras) Ozzie Bodden	(substituted on) 30'
MF	39	(Honduras) Brayan Martínez	(substituted on) 55'
FW	33	(Honduras) Dicktmar Hernández	(substituted on) 73'
Manager:
(Argentina) Héctor Vargas

GK	28	(Honduras) Gerson Argueta
DF	3	(Honduras) Mario Padilla
DF	5	(Honduras) Johny Galdámez
DF	8	(Honduras) Óscar Fortín
MF	14	(Honduras) Óliver Morazán
MF	16	(Brazil) Romario Pinto	(yellow card) 47'	(yellow card) 59' (red card)
MF	23	(Honduras) Francisco Benítez	(substituted off) 68'
MF	25	(Honduras) Selvin Tinoco
FW	15	(Honduras) Ángel Pineda
FW	–	(Honduras) Luis Ramírez
FW	–	(Colombia) Giovanni Mina	(substituted off) 68'
Substitutions:
MF	22	(Honduras) Clayvin Zúniga	(substituted on) 68'
FW	9	(Honduras) Maynor Cabrera	(substituted on) 68'
Manager:
(Honduras) Mauro Reyes

- Victoria won 3–2 on aggregate score.

===== Marathón vs Platense =====
24 April 2013
19:30 (UTC−06:00)
1st leg

Platense	1–1	Marathón
Montes 37'	Report	49' Flores

Estadio Excélsior
Puerto Cortés, Cortés
Attendance: 2,636
Referee: Geovanny Mendoza

Platense	Marathón

GK	12	(Honduras) Adalid Puerto
DF	4	(Honduras) Juan Montes
DF	5	(Honduras) Edwin Ávila	(yellow card) 7'
DF	22	(Honduras) Irbin Guerrero
MF	8	(Honduras) Jaime Rosales	Yellow card
MF	16	(Honduras) Jorge Cardona	(substituted off) 78'
MF	17	(Honduras) Víctor Zúniga
FW	3	(Colombia) Javier Estupiñán	(substituted off) 45'
FW	13	(Honduras) Bayron Méndez	(yellow card) 30'
FW	27	(Honduras) Jerrick Díaz
FW	30	(Honduras) Ian Osorio	(substituted off) 57'
Substitutions:
DF	20	(Honduras) Walter Hernández	(substituted on) 45'
MF	21	(Honduras) Francisco López	(substituted on) 57'
FW	11	(Honduras) José Casildo	(substituted on) 78'
Manager:
(Honduras) Hernán García

GK	1	(Belize) Shane Orio
DF	3	(Honduras) Ástor Henríquez
DF	5	(Colombia) Luis Castro
DF	18	(Honduras) Erick Norales	(substituted off) 45'
DF	23	(Honduras) Mauricio Sabillón
MF	8	(Honduras) Reinieri Mayorquín	(yellow card) 25'
MF	12	(Honduras) Mariano Acevedo
MF	13	(Honduras) Julián Rápalo	(yellow card) 61'
MF	19	(Honduras) Mario Berríos
FW	9	(Honduras) Rony Flores	(substituted off) 78'
FW	20	(El Salvador) Léster Blanco
Substitutions:
MF	28	(Honduras) Emil Martínez	(substituted on) 45'
MF	21	(Honduras) Júnior Sandoval	(substituted on) 71'
FW	11	(Honduras) Randy Diamond	(substituted on) 78'
Manager:
(Honduras) Carlos Martínez

28 April 2013
15:45 (UTC−06:00)
2nd leg

Marathón	1–3	Platense
Blanco 6'	Report	Cardona 45'; Méndez 55'; Montes 75'

Estadio Yankel Rosenthal
San Pedro Sula, Cortés
Referee: Héctor Rodríguez

Marathón	Platense

GK	1	(Belize) Shane Orio
DF	3	(Honduras) Ástor Henríquez
DF	5	(Colombia) Luis Castro	(yellow card) 43'
DF	18	(Honduras) Erick Norales
DF	23	(Honduras) Mauricio Sabillón	(substituted off) 65'
MF	8	(Honduras) Reinieri Mayorquín	(yellow card) 30'	(substituted off) 46'
MF	12	(Honduras) Mariano Acevedo
MF	13	(Honduras) Julián Rápalo
MF	19	(Honduras) Mario Berríos
FW	9	(Honduras) Rony Flores
FW	20	(El Salvador) Léster Blanco	(substituted off) 63'
Substitutions:
MF	28	(Honduras) Emil Martínez	(substituted on) 46'
FW	15	(Honduras) Marco Vega	(substituted on) 63'
MF	17	(Honduras) Wilmer Fuentes	(substituted on) 65'
Manager:
(Honduras) Carlos Martínez

GK	12	(Honduras) Adalid Puerto
DF	4	(Honduras) Juan Montes
DF	5	(Honduras) Edwin Ávila	(yellow card) 26'
DF	20	(Honduras) Walter Hernández	(yellow card) 13'
DF	26	(Honduras) Nixon Duarte	(yellow card) 54'
MF	8	(Honduras) Jaime Rosales
MF	16	(Honduras) Jorge Cardona	(substituted off) 72'
MF	55	(Honduras) Bani Lozano	(substituted off) 82'
FW	3	(Colombia) Javier Estupiñán
FW	13	(Honduras) Bayron Méndez	(substituted off) 86'
FW	30	(Honduras) Ian Osorio
Substitutions:
FW	2	(Honduras) Nahúm Solís	(substituted on) 72'
MF	14	(Honduras) Ronmel Corea	(substituted on) 82'
MF	10	(Honduras) Marvin Sánchez	(substituted on) 86'
Manager:
(Honduras) Hernán García

- Platense won 4–2 on aggregate score.

==== Semifinals ====
===== Olimpia vs Platense =====
2 May 2013
19:30 (UTC−06:00)
1st leg

Platense	0–0	Olimpia
	Report

Estadio Excélsior
Puerto Cortés, Cortés
Referee: Miguel Torres

Platense	Olimpia

GK	12	(Honduras) Adalid Puerto
DF	4	(Honduras) Juan Montes
DF	5	(Honduras) Edwin Ávila
DF	20	(Honduras) Walter Hernández
DF	26	(Honduras) Nixon Duarte
MF	8	(Honduras) Jaime Rosales
MF	16	(Honduras) Jorge Cardona	(red card) 81'
MF	55	(Honduras) Bani Lozano	(substituted off) 73'
FW	3	(Colombia) Javier Estupiñán	(yellow card) 25'
FW	13	(Honduras) Bayron Méndez
FW	30	(Honduras) Ian Osorio
Substitutions:
FW	–	(Honduras) John Beamount	(substituted on) 73'	(substituted off) 88'
DF	2	(Honduras) Nahún Solís	(substituted on) 88'
Manager:
(Honduras) Hernán García

GK	27	(Honduras) Noel Valladares
DF	4	(Brazil) Fábio de Souza
DF	5	(Honduras) Brayan Beckeles	Yellow card	Red card
DF	6	(Honduras) Juan García	(yellow card) 78'
DF	23	(Honduras) Hendry Córdova	(yellow card) 11'
DF	30	(Honduras) Johnny Palacios
MF	7	(Honduras) Carlos Mejía	Yellow card
MF	16	(Honduras) Alexander López	(substituted off) 36'
MF	20	(Honduras) Irvin Reyna
FW	18	(Brazil) Douglas Caetano	(substituted off) 72'
FW	21	(Honduras) Roger Rojas	(substituted off) 72'
Substitutions:
MF	25	(Honduras) Javier Portillo	(substituted on) 36'
MF	8	(Honduras) Reynaldo Tilguath	(substituted on) 72'
FW	33	(Uruguay) Ramiro Bruschi	(substituted on) 72'
Manager:
(Honduras) Juan Espinoza

5 May 2013
16:00 (UTC−06:00)
2nd leg

Olimpia	0–0	Platense
	Report

Estadio Tiburcio Carías Andino
Tegucigalpa, Francisco Morazán

Olimpia	Platense

GK	28	(Honduras) Donis Escober
DF	3	(Honduras) Henry Bermúdez
DF	4	(Brazil) Fábio de Souza	(yellow card) 54'
DF	6	(Honduras) Juan García	(yellow card) 85'
DF	23	(Honduras) Hendry Córdova
DF	30	(Honduras) Johnny Palacios
MF	8	(Honduras) Reynaldo Tilguath	(substituted off) 65'
MF	15	(Argentina) Sebastián Rosano	(substituted off) 67'
MF	25	(Honduras) Javier Portillo
FW	18	(Brazil) Douglas Caetano
FW	33	(Uruguay) Ramiro Bruschi	(yellow card) 67'	(substituted off) 70'
Substitutions:
MF	16	(Honduras) Alexander López	(substituted on) 65'
MF	7	(Honduras) Carlos Mejía	(substituted on) 67'
FW	21	(Honduras) Roger Rojas	(substituted on) 70'
Manager:
(Honduras) Juan Espinoza

GK	12	(Honduras) Adalid Puerto
DF	2	(Honduras) Nahún Solís	(substituted off) 35'
DF	4	(Honduras) Juan Montes	(yellow card) 23'
DF	5	(Honduras) Edwin Ávila
DF	20	(Honduras) Walter Hernández
DF	26	(Honduras) Nixon Duarte	(substituted off) 77'
MF	8	(Honduras) Jaime Rosales	(yellow card) 54'
FW	3	(Colombia) Javier Esputiñán
FW	13	(Honduras) Bayron Méndez
FW	27	(Honduras) Jerrick Díaz	(substituted off) 62'
FW	30	(Honduras) Ian Osorio
Substitutions:
MF	55	(Honduras) Bani Lozano	(substituted on) 35'
MF	10	(Honduras) Marvin Sánchez	(substituted on) 62'
FW	21	(Honduras) Francisco López	(substituted on) 77'
Manager:
(Honduras) Hernán García

- Olimpia 0–0 Platense on aggregate score; Olimpia advanced on better regular season performance.

===== Real Sociedad vs Victoria =====
1 May 2013
19:00 (UTC−06:00)
1st leg

Victoria	0–3	Real Sociedad
	Report	Martínez 13' 52'; Melgares 17'

Estadio Nilmo Edwards
La Ceiba, Atlántida
Attendance: 4,261
Referee: Melvin Matamoros

Victoria	Real Sociedad

GK	1	(Honduras) Orlin Vallecillo
DF	5	(Honduras) José Velásquez
DF	6	(Colombia) Eder Arias	(yellow card) 40'
DF	25	(Honduras) Wilmer Crisanto	(substituted off) 27'
DF	27	(Honduras) Félix Crisanto	(substituted off) 18'
MF	16	(Honduras) Héctor Castellanos
MF	39	(Honduras) Bryan Martínez	(yellow card) 72'
FW	9	(Honduras) Víctor Ortiz
FW	11	(Honduras) Rubén Licona
FW	14	(Honduras) Júnior Lacayo
FW	29	(Honduras) Ozzie Bodden
Substitutions:
MF	10	(Honduras) Michel Rivera	(substituted on) 18'
DF	15	(Honduras) Edgar Flores	(substituted on) 27'	(yellow card) 28'
–	–
Manager:
(Argentina) Héctor Vargas

GK	1	(Honduras) Sandro Cárcamo
DF	4	(Honduras) Dilmer Gutiérrez	Yellow card
DF	14	(Honduras) Misael Ruiz	(yellow card) 11'
DF	17	(Honduras) Osman Melgares
DF	18	(Honduras) Henry Clark
MF	3	(Honduras) Efraín López
MF	10	(Honduras) Julio de León	(substituted off) 26'
MF	20	(Honduras) Elkin González
MF	30	(Honduras) José Williams
FW	11	(Honduras) Rony Martínez
FW	22	(Honduras) Diego Reyes	(substituted off) 74'
Substitutions:
DF	6	(Honduras) José Barralaga	(substituted on) 26'	(yellow card) 45'	(substituted off) 50'
DF	24	(Honduras) Yeer Gutiérrez	(substituted on) 50'
FW	7	(Honduras) Osnaldo Hernández	(substituted on) 74'
Manager:
(Colombia) Jairo Ríos

5 May 2013
14:00 (UTC−06:00)
2nd leg

Real Sociedad	2–2	Victoria
González 17'; Martínez 35'	Report	Lacayo 31'; Martínez 86'

Estadio Francisco Martínez Durón
Tocoa, Colón
Referee: Orlando Hernández

Real Sociedad	Victoria

GK	1	(Honduras) Sandro Cárcamo
DF	4	(Honduras) Dilmer Gutiérrez
DF	6	(Honduras) José Barralaga
DF	14	(Honduras) Misael Ruiz
DF	17	(Honduras) Osman Melgares
DF	18	(Honduras) Henry Clark
MF	3	(Honduras) Efraín López	(yellow card) 40'
MF	20	(Honduras) Elkin González
MF	30	(Honduras) José Williams	(yellow card) 61'
FW	11	(Honduras) Rony Martínez	(substituted off) 72'
FW	22	(Honduras) Diego Reyes
Substitutions:
MF	13	(Honduras) Sergio Peña	(substituted on) 40'
MF	21	(Honduras) Wilson Güity	(substituted on) 40'
FW	7	(Honduras) Osnaldo Hernández	(substituted on) 72'
Manager:
(Colombia) Jairo Ríos

GK	23	(Honduras) John Bodden	(yellow card) 19'
DF	6	(Colombia) Eder Arias
DF	18	(Honduras) Denis Suazo
DF	25	(Honduras) Wilmer Crisanto
DF	27	(Honduras) Félix Crisanto
MF	10	(Honduras) Michel Rivera	(yellow card) 2'
FW	11	(Honduras) Rubén Licona
FW	12	(Honduras) Rubén Rivera
FW	14	(Honduras) Júnior Lacayo	(yellow card) 60'
FW	19	(Honduras) Jairo Róchez
FW	–	(Honduras) Ronald Montoya	(substituted off) 27'
Substitutions:
FW	29	(Honduras) Ozzie Bodden	(substituted on) 27'
–	–
–	–
Manager:
(Argentina) Héctor Vargas

- Real Sociedad won 5–2 on aggregate score.

==== Final ====
===== Olimpia vs Real Sociedad =====
12 May 2013
14:00 (UTC−06:00)
1st leg

Real Sociedad	1–0	Olimpia
Reyes 75'	Report

Estadio Francisco Martínez Durón
Tocoa, Colón
Attendance: 3,359
Referee: Héctor Rodríguez

Real Sociedad	Olimpia

GK	1	(Honduras) Sandro Cárcamo
DF	4	(Honduras) Dilmer Gutiérrez	(yellow card) 60'
DF	14	(Honduras) Misael Ruiz
DF	17	(Honduras) Osman Melgares
DF	18	(Honduras) Henry Clark
MF	3	(Honduras) Efraín López
MF	20	(Honduras) Elkin González	(substituted off) 86'
MF	21	(Honduras) Wilson Güity
MF	30	(Honduras) José Williams	(yellow card) 37'	(substituted off) 70'
FW	11	(Honduras) Rony Martínez
FW	22	(Honduras) Diego Reyes
Substitutions:
FW	9	(Honduras) Juan Cárcamo	(substituted on) 70'
MF	13	(Honduras) Sergio Peña	(substituted on) 86'
Manager:
(Colombia) Jairo Ríos

GK	27	(Honduras) Noel Valladares
DF	4	(Brazil) Fábio de Souza
DF	5	(Honduras) Brayan Beckeles
DF	6	(Honduras) Juan García
DF	23	(Honduras) Hendry Córdova
DF	30	(Honduras) Johnny Palacios	(yellow card) 34'	(yellow card) 41' (red card)
MF	7	(Honduras) Carlos Mejía	(substituted off) 61'
MF	20	(Honduras) Irvin Reyna
MF	25	(Honduras) Javier Portillo	(yellow card) 35'	(yellow card) 68' (red card)
FW	21	(Honduras) Roger Rojas	(substituted off) 44'
FW	33	(Uruguay) Ramiro Bruschi	(substituted off) 72'
Substitutions:
DF	22	(Honduras) José Arévalo	(substituted on) 41'
MF	15	(Argentina) Sebastián Rosano	(substituted on) 61'
DF	3	(Honduras) Henry Bermúdez	(substituted on) 72'
Manager:
(Honduras) Juan Espinoza

19 May 2013
16:00 (UTC−06:00)
2nd leg

Olimpia	2–0	Real Sociedad
Rojas 6'; Beckeles 60'	Report

Estadio Tiburcio Carías Andino
Tegucigalpa, Francisco Morazán
Referee: Armando Castro

Olimpia	Real Sociedad

GK	28	(Honduras) Donis Escober	(yellow card) 86'
DF	3	(Honduras) Henry Bermúdez
DF	4	(Honduras) Fábio de Souza	(yellow card) 24'
DF	5	(Honduras) Brayan Beckeles
DF	6	(Honduras) Juan García
DF	23	(Honduras) Hendry Córdova	(yellow card) 22'
MF	7	(Honduras) Carlos Mejía	(yellow card) 39'
MF	8	(Honduras) Reynaldo Tilguath	(substituted off) 78'
MF	16	(Honduras) Alexander López	(substituted off) 83'
FW	18	(Brazil) Douglas Caetano
FW	21	(Honduras) Roger Rojas	(substituted off) 72'
Substitutions:
FW	33	(Uruguay) Ramiro Bruschi	(substituted on) 72'
DF	22	(Honduras) José Arévalo	(substituted on) 78'
MF	15	(Argentina) Sebastián Rosano	(substituted on) 83'
Manager:
(Honduras) Juan Espinoza

GK	1	(Honduras) Sandro Cárcamo
DF	4	(Honduras) Dilmer Gutiérrez	(yellow card) 73'
DF	14	(Honduras) Misael Ruiz	(yellow card) 12'
DF	17	(Honduras) Osman Melgares
DF	18	(Honduras) Henry Clark
MF	3	(Honduras) Efraín López
MF	10	(Honduras) Julio de León	(substituted off) 62'
MF	20	(Honduras) Elkin González	(substituted off) 66'
MF	30	(Honduras) José Williams	(substituted off) 85'
FW	11	(Honduras) Rony Martínez
FW	22	(Honduras) Diego Reyes
Substitutions:
MF	21	(Honduras) Wilson Güity	(substituted on) 62'
MF	13	(Honduras) Sergio Peña	(substituted on) 66'
FW	9	(Honduras) Juan Cárcamo	(substituted on) 85'
Manager:
(Colombia) Jairo Ríos

- Olimpia won 2–1 on aggregate score.

Liga Nacional
2012–13 Clausura champion

27th title

=== Top goalscorers ===
As of 19 May 2013

- 12 goals:

(Honduras) Rony Martínez (Real Sociedad)

- 11 goals:

(Colombia) Javier Estupiñán (Platense)

- 9 goals:

(Uruguay) Claudio Cardozo (Real España)
(Honduras) Roger Rojas (Olimpia)

- 6 goals:

(Uruguay) Óscar Torlacoff (Atlético Choloma)
(Honduras) Júnior Lacayo (Victoria)
(Honduras) Diego Reyes (Real Sociedad)

- 5 goals:

(Brazil) Jocimar Nascimento (Motagua)
(Brazil) Romário Pinto (Deportes Savio)
(Honduras) Rony Flores (Marathón)
(El Salvador) Léster Blanco (Marathón)
(Honduras) Luis Ramírez (Deportes Savio)

- 4 goals:

(Uruguay) Ramiro Bruschi (Olimpia)
(Honduras) Víctor Ortiz (Victoria)
(Argentina) Santiago Minella (Deportes Savio)
(Honduras) Melvin Valladares (Motagua)
(Honduras) Shannon Welcome (Vida)
(Honduras) Emil Martínez (Marathón)
(Honduras) Eddie Hernández (Motagua)

- 3 goals:

(Honduras) Roby Norales (Motagua)
(Honduras) Mariano Acevedo (Marathón)
(Honduras) Osman Hernández (Atlético Choloma)
(Brazil) Douglas Caetano (Olimpia)
(Honduras) Walter Martínez (Vida)
(Honduras) Osman Melgares (Real Sociedad)
(Honduras) Wilmer Crisanto (Victoria)
(Honduras) Francisco Benítez (Deportes Savio)

- 2 goals:

(Honduras) Marco Vega (Marathón)
(Honduras) Efraín López (Real Sociedad)
(Honduras) Víctor Mena (Atlético Choloma)
(Honduras) Amado Guevara (Motagua)
(Panama) Manuel Mosquera (Victoria)
(Brazil) Fábio de Souza (Olimpia)
(Colombia) Luis Castro (Marathón)
(Honduras) Jorge Cardona (Platense)
(Honduras) Leonardo Isaula (Atlético Choloma)
(Honduras) Román Castillo (Vida)
(Honduras) Alexander López (Olimpia)
(Honduras) Roy Posas (Atlético Choloma)
(Honduras) Jerrick Díaz (Platense)
(Honduras) Rubén Rivera (Victoria)
(Honduras) Juan Montes (Platense)
(Honduras) Brayan Martínez (Victoria)
(Honduras) Francisco López (Platense)
(Argentina) Jonatan Hansen (Real España)
(Honduras) Carlos Discua (Motagua)
(Honduras) Maynor Cabrera (Deportes Savio)
(Honduras) Julio de León (Real Sociedad)
(Honduras) Romell Quioto (Vida)
(Honduras) Arnold Peralta (Vida)

- 1 goal:

(Honduras) Randy Diamond (Marathón)
(Honduras) Wilson Güity (Real Sociedad)
(Honduras) Víctor Zúniga (Platense)
(Honduras) Aly Arriola (Deportes Savio)
(Honduras) Félix Crisanto (Victoria)
(Honduras) Ozzie Bodden (Victoria)
(Honduras) Clayvin Zúniga (Deportes Savio)
(Honduras) Marlon Peña (Real España)
(Honduras) Carlos Morán (Motagua)
(Honduras) Óscar García (Atlético Choloma)
(Honduras) Ángel Tejada (Atlético Choloma)
(Honduras) Víctor Moncada (Atlético Choloma)
(Honduras) Denis Suazo (Victoria)
(Honduras) Jairo Róchez (Victoria)
(Honduras) Giovanni Lazo (Deportes Savio)
(Honduras) Júnior Sandoval (Marathón)
(Honduras) Orvin Paz (Atlético Choloma)
(Honduras) Elkin González (Real Sociedad)
(Honduras) Ángel Pineda (Deportes Savio)
(Honduras) Abner Méndez (Atlético Choloma)
(Honduras) Miguel Castillo (Real España)
(Honduras) Walter Hernández (Platense)
(Honduras) Uberdy García (Atlético Choloma)
(Honduras) Edgar Flores (Victoria)
(Honduras) John Beaumont (Platense)
(Honduras) Franco Güity (Real España)
(Honduras) Nery Medina (Motagua)
(Honduras) Carlos Mejía (Olimpia)
(Honduras) Sergio Peña (Real Sociedad)
(Honduras) Mauricio Castro (Atlético Choloma)
(Honduras) Bryan Róchez (Real España)
(Honduras) Selvin Tinoco (Deportes Savio)
(Honduras) Henry Clark (Real Sociedad)
(Honduras) Marvin Barrios (Motagua)
(Honduras) Carlos Gutiérrez (Olimpia)
(Honduras) Bayron Méndez (Platense)
(Honduras) Alfredo Mejía (Motagua)
(Honduras) Christian Altamirano (Marathón)
(Honduras) Mario Berríos (Marathón)
(Honduras) Luis Guzmán (Atlético Choloma)
(Honduras) Héctor García (Deportes Savio)
(Honduras) Jorge Lozano (Vida)
(Honduras) Edder Delgado (Real España)
(Honduras) Dicktmar Hernández (Victoria)
(Uruguay) Julio Rodríguez (Real España)
(Honduras) Luis Santamaría (Atlético Choloma)
(Honduras) Giancarlo Maldonado (Platense)
(Honduras) Omar Elvir (Motagua)
(Honduras) Juan Mejía (Olimpia)
(Honduras) Bani Lozano (Platense)
(Honduras) Rubén Licona (Victoria)
(Honduras) Juan García (Olimpia)
(Honduras) Georgie Welcome (Motagua)
(Honduras) Brayan Beckeles (Olimpia)

- 1 own goal:

(Honduras) Mario Chávez (Vida)
(Honduras) Nixon Duarte (Platense)
(Honduras) José Velásquez (Victoria)
(Honduras) Júnior Izaguirre (Motagua)
(Honduras) Óscar García (Atlético Choloma)
(Honduras) Wilfredo Barahona (Real España)
(Honduras) César Oseguera (Motagua)
(Honduras) Chestyn Onofre (Vida)
(Honduras) Ian Osorio (Platense)
(Honduras) Julio Suazo (Victoria)
(Honduras) Henry Figueroa (Motagua)

== Aggregate table ==
Relegation was determined by the aggregated table of both Apertura and Clausura tournaments. On 20 April 2013, Atlético Choloma was relegated to the Liga de Ascenso after reaching 38 points, two less than C.D.S. Vida.

Pos	Team	Pld	W	D	L	GF	GA	GD	Pts	Qualification or relegation
1	Olimpia	36	20	12	4	58	24	+34	72	Qualified to the 2013–14 CONCACAF Champions League
2	Victoria	36	14	14	8	46	37	+9	56	Qualified to the 2013–14 CONCACAF Champions League
3	Motagua	36	12	12	12	48	38	+10	48	
4	Marathón	36	11	14	11	47	45	+2	47	
5	Real Sociedad	36	12	11	13	36	34	+2	47	
6	Platense	36	11	11	14	36	46	−10	44	
7	Real España	36	10	13	13	39	44	−5	43	
8	Deportes Savio	36	11	9	16	39	53	−14	42	
9	Vida	36	9	13	14	41	64	−23	40	
10	Atlético Choloma	36	7	17	12	53	56	−3	38	Relegation to the 2013–14 Liga de Ascenso

Updated to match(es) played on 20 April 2013. Source:
