= Esdras Padilla =

Honduran footballer (born 1989)

Personal information
- Full name: Esdras Isaí Padilla Reyes
- Date of birth: 4 September 1989 (age 37)
- Place of birth: Tegucigalpa, Honduras
- Height: 1.84 m (6 ft 0 in)
- Position: Defender

Team information
- Current team: Juticalpa

Youth career
- Municipal Valencia

Senior career*
Years	Team	Apps	(Gls)
2005–2008	Hispano	0	(0)
2008–2015	Motagua	40	(0)
2015–	Juticalpa	38	(5)

International career^{‡}
2008–2009	Honduras U–20	10	(1)
2011	Honduras U–23	1	(0)
2016–	Honduras	1	(0)
Medal record
Honduras
Third place	CONCACAF U-20 Championship	2009
- * Club domestic league appearances and goals as of 30 May 2013 ‡ National team caps and goals as of 25 September 2011

Esdras Isaí Padilla Reyes (born 4 September 1989) is a Honduran football player, who most recently played for F.C. Motagua.

== Club career ==
Because of a rule in Honduran football stating that each team must play an under 20 player for a total of 540 minutes, Esdras was able to take a spot and become a regular player for Hispano in 2008.

== International career ==
He was called up to train with the national squad but wasn't in the lineup against any team. Padilla played for Honduras at the 2009 FIFA U-20 World Cup in Egypt.

=== International goals ===
#	Date	Venue	Opponent	Score	Result	Competition
1	2008-10-03	Comayagua	Panama	1 – 0	5–2	2009 CONCACAF U-20 Championship

== Personal life ==
He has played at Motagua alongside his younger brother, Eleazar Padilla. His other brother, Rigoberto Padilla plays for Victoria.
