= Mauricio Castro =

Honduran footballer (born 1981)

Personal information
- Full name: Mauricio Fernando Castro Matamoros
- Date of birth: August 11, 1981 (age 45)
- Place of birth: Tegucigalpa, Honduras
- Height: 5 ft 10 in (1.78 m)
- Position: Midfielder

Team information
- Current team: Atlético Choloma
- Number: 8

Senior career*
Years	Team	Apps	(Gls)
2002–2004	Motagua		(3)
2004–2005	Universidad		
2005–2007	Hispano	11	(0)
2007–2008	Olimpia		
2008–2010	New England Revolution	30	(0)
2011	Municipal		
2011	Necaxa		
2012–present	Atlético Choloma		

International career^{‡}
2003–2007	Honduras	5	(0)
- * Club domestic league appearances and goals as of 1 November 2009 ‡ National team caps and goals as of 3 April 2009

Mauricio Fernando Castro Matamoros (born August 11, 1981) is a Honduran footballer who currently plays for Atlético Choloma in the Honduran National League.

== Club career ==
Nicknamed Pipo, Castro began his career in his native Honduras, playing for six seasons in Honduras' top division, the Honduran National League, for F.C. Motagua, Universidad, Hispano and Olimpia.

=== Major League Soccer ===
Castro signed for the New England Revolution on February 18, 2008. He was seriously injured by Chicago Fire's Mexican forward Cuauhtemoc Blanco in his first season.

Castro made his first Revolution start, MLS debut, and Revolution debut, in the 2008 New England Revolution season opener, a 3–0 win over Houston Dynamo FC on March 29. He recorded his first Revolution assist on June 12, setting up a Kheli Dube goal in the Revolution's 2–0 win at Houston. In total, Castro made 24 appearances for the Revolution in league play in 2008, notching three assists. In the 2008 U.S. Open Cup Quarterfinals, Castro scored the decisive penalty kick against Crystal Palace Baltimore to put New England through to the Semifinals.

After 30 appearances, including 25 starts, for the Revs in 2008 and 2009, Castro was released by the Revolution on May 14, 2010, having failed to make an appearance in the 2010 season.

In 2011 the left-sided midfielder returned to Honduras and signed with second division Municipal. He then joined Necaxa for the 2011 Apertura season and moved to Atlético Choloma ahead of the 2012 Clausura. He was said to have left Choloma in summer 2012 after playing only two matches into the 2012 Apertura season, since he had received only half of his salary but later declared that a talk with manager Edwin Pavón made him stay with the club.

== International career ==
Castro made his debut for Honduras in a June 2003 friendly match against Guatemala and has earned a total of 5 caps, scoring no goals. He has represented his country at the 2007 UNCAF Nations Cup.

His final international was a March 2007 friendly match against El Salvador.

== Personal life ==
Castro was born in Honduras' capital Tegucigalpa to Andrés Castro and Lourdes Matamoros. He is married to Glenda and they have two children: Maurizio Alessandro Castro López and Katherine Yanel Castro López.

== Honors ==
=== New England Revolution ===
- North American SuperLiga: 1

2008
