= Maynor Suazo =

Honduran footballer (born 1979)

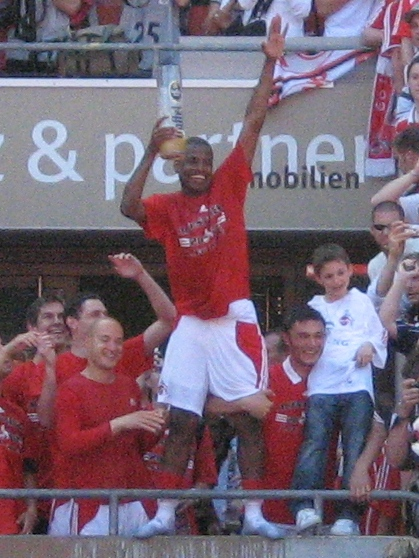

Personal information
- Full name: Maynor René Suazo Antunez
- Date of birth: 10 August 1979 (age 47)
- Place of birth: San Pedro Sula, Honduras
- Height: 1.80 m (5 ft 11 in)
- Position: Attacking midfielder

Youth career
- Marathón

Senior career*
Years	Team	Apps	(Gls)
1999–2000	Marathón	14	(1)
2000–2006	Wüstenrot Salzburg	114	(4)
2002–2003	→ Olimpia (loan)	22	(3)
2006	→ Brann Bergen (loan)	1	(0)
2006–2009	Antalyaspor	27	(0)
2007–2008	→ 1. FC Köln (loan)	16	(0)
2009	Real Juventud		(0)
2010	Atletico Veragüense		
2011	Hispano		
2011–2012	Atlético Choloma	8	(1)

International career
1999–2007	Honduras	29	(0)
- * Club domestic league appearances and goals

Maynor René Suazo Antunez (born 10 August 1979) is a Honduran former professional footballer who played as an attacking midfielder. Maynor is the cousin of footballer David Suazo and retired Honduran footballer, Nicolás Suazo. Both played together at their school's football team. He is also Hendry Thomas's cousin.

== Club career ==
Maynor Suazo began his career with top Honduran side Marathón. His play with Marathón did not go unnoticed and in 2000 he was signed by SV Austria Salzburg. He quickly established himself in the Austrian Football Bundesliga appearing in 23 matches and scoring 1 goal in his first season at the club. For the 2002–03 season Suazo was loaned out to Honduran side Olimpia and helped the club capture the 2002–03 Apertura. He then returned to Salzburg and was once again an important player for the club. In 2004 Suazo was voted player of the year in the Austrian Football Bundesliga.

On 31 March 2006, Suazo was loaned out to Norwegian side SK Brann, in a deal lasting until June 2006. Brann also got the exclusive right to buy Suazo when the loan deal expired. They decided not to buy as Suazo only played 29 minutes in the Norwegian Premier League, the team preferring local lad Helge Haugen in defensive midfield.

Suazo returned to Red Bull Salzburg after his loan deal with Brann expired. He believed he had a fair chance to gain a regular spot on the team, after Lothar Matthäus was hired as new coach. However, in July 2006, Suazo was sold to the Turkish club Antalyaspor in a deal worth €800,000. Suazo made his debut for Antalyaspor in a match versus Çaykur Rizespor on 6 August 2006. In his first season with the Turkish club he appeared in 27 league matches.

On 31 July 2007, Suazo moved to 2. Bundesliga side 1. FC Köln signing a one-year loan deal with an option for a second season. He became the first Honduran to play in Germany. After initially being plagued by injuries during his season in Germany, Suazo became an important player in helping Köln gain promotion to the Bundesliga during the 2007–08 season. At the conclusion of the season Köln was interested in permanently acquiring Suazo, however Antalyaspor decided to retain him. Upon his return to Turkey Suazo did not appear to be in the clubs plans and also suffered a knee injury. He left the club when his contract expired in June 2009 and joined Real Juventud. During February 2010 he went on trial with New York Red Bulls. New York did not offer Suazo a contract. In September 2010 he moved abroad again to play for Panamese outfit Atletico Veragüense.

In summer 2011 he left relegated Hispano for Atlético Choloma and in summer 2012 he was named a possible reinforcement for Vida.

== International career ==
Suazo played for the Honduras national under-20 football team at the 1999 FIFA World Youth Championship. He made his senior debut for Honduras in a May 1999 friendly match against Haiti, a game in which David Suazo and Julio César Suazo also made their international debuts. He has earned a total of 29 caps, scoring no goals. He has represented his country in 16 FIFA World Cup qualification matches and played at the 2000 Summer Olympics. He has also played at the 2003 UNCAF Nations Cup.

His final international was a September 2007 friendly match against Ecuador.

== Honours ==
Olimpia

- Honduran Liga Nacional: 2002–03 Apertura

Individual

- Austrian Football Bundesliga Footballer of the Year: 2004
