= Alex Andino =

Honduran footballer (born 1982)

Personal information
- Full name: Alex René Andino Benavídez
- Date of birth: 2 August 1982 (age 44)
- Place of birth: Olanchito, Honduras
- Height: 1.78 m (5 ft 10 in)
- Position: Midfielder

Team information
- Current team: Atletico Limeño

Senior career*
Years	Team	Apps	(Gls)
2002–2006	Platense		
2006–2007	Hispano		
2007–2009	Real España	55	(2)
2010–2011	Real Juventud	15	(0)
2011–2012	Atlético Choloma	5	(0)
2013–	Atletico Limeño		

International career
2003	Honduras	6	(0)
- * Club domestic league appearances and goals as of 24 September 2011

Alex René Andino Benavídez (born 2 August 1982) is a Honduran footballer who plays as a midfielder for club Atletico Limeño in the Honduran second division.

== Club career ==
Andino has played for Honduran top tier outfits Platense, Hispano, Real España and Real Juventud.

=== Atlético Choloma ===
On 20 August 2011, Andino made his debut with the team when he came on as a substitute for Fayron Barahona in the 61st minute against Platense in a 3–1 win, marking the first win of the club in Liga Nacional de Honduras.

== International career ==
Andino made his debut for Honduras in a February 2003 friendly match against Argentina and has earned a total of 6 caps, scoring no goals. He has represented his country at the 2003 UNCAF Nations Cup.

His final international game was a February 2003 UNCAF Nations Cup match against Guatemala.
