= Orlin Vallecillo =

Honduran footballer (born 1983)

Personal information
- Full name: Orlin Jared Vallecillo Paguada
- Date of birth: 1 July 1983 (age 43)
- Place of birth: Sonaguera, Honduras
- Height: 1.93 m (6 ft 4 in)
- Position: Goalkeeper

Team information
- Current team: Honduras Progreso

Senior career*
Years	Team	Apps	(Gls)
2003–2004	Marathón		
2005–2006	Hispano		
2006–2008	Real España		
2009	Real Juventud	14	(0)
2009	Hispano		
2010–2011	Marathón		
2012–2013	Victoria		
2013–present	Honduras Progreso		

International career^{‡}
2007	Honduras	8	(0)
- * Club domestic league appearances and goals as of 2007 ‡ National team caps and goals as of 2007

Orlin Jared Vallecillo Paguada (born 1 July 1983) is a Honduran professional footballer who plays as a goalkeeper for Liga Nacional club Honduras Progreso.

== Club career ==
Vallecillo started his career at Marathón and played for Hispano and Real España. In December 2008 he moved to Real Juventud with whom he got relegated in May 2009 before returning to Hispano a month later and then Marathón ahead of the 2010 Clausura. He joined Victoria for the 2012 Clausura and Honduras Progreso for the 2013 Apertura.

== International career ==
Vallecillo made his debut for Honduras in a March 2007 friendly match against El Salvador, when he came on as a late sub for Noel Valladares, and has earned a total of 8 caps, scoring no goals. He has represented his country at the 2007 CONCACAF Gold Cup and was a non-playing squad member at the 2011 CONCACAF Gold Cup.

His final international was an August 2007 friendly match against El Salvador.

== Personal life ==
His brother, Erick Vallecillo, has also played for Real España and the national team.
