= Leonardo Isaula =

Honduran midfielder (born 1977)

Personal information
- Full name: Leonardo Rubén Isaula George
- Date of birth: 8 February 1977 (age 49)
- Place of birth: Yoro, Honduras
- Position: Midfielder

Team information
- Current team: Atlético Choloma
- Number: 26

Senior career*
Years	Team	Apps	(Gls)
1995–1998	Independiente Villela	63	(2)
1998–2005	Real España	182	(10)
2006	Municipal Valencia	16	(4)
2006–2008	Hispano	72	(14)
2009	Motagua	27	(5)
2010	Hispano	18	(1)
2010–2012	Necaxa	50	(1)
2012–	Atlético Choloma	14	(4)
- * Club domestic league appearances and goals as of 2012-03-17

Leonardo Rubén Isaula George (born 8 February 1977) is a Honduran midfielder who currently plays for Atlético Choloma in the Liga Nacional de Honduras.

== Club career ==
Isaula made his debut in senior football on 17 September 1995, when he played for Independiente Villela against Honduran giants F.C. Motagua. He scored his first goal three years later, also against Motagua. He then had a long spell with Real España and also played for Municipal Valencia and Hispano before finally playing for F.C. Motagua himself. After another stint at Hispano, Isaula joined Necaxa in summer 2010 and signed for Atlético Choloma for the 2012 Apertura season.

In November 2012, Isaula became only the second player to reach 440 matches in Honduran football, behind Denilson Costa.

== International career ==
Isaula made his debut for Honduras in an April 2003 friendly match against Colombia, his only international match.
