= Rossana (given name) =

Rossana is a feminine Italian given name. Notable people with the name include:

- Rossana Casale (born 1959), Italian singer
- Rossana Dresdner (born 1961), Chilean journalist and writer
- Rossana Lombardo (born 1962), Italian sprinter
- Rossana Martini (1926–1988), Italian actress, model and beauty pageant winner
- Rossana Morabito (born 1969), Italian sprinter
- Rossana Podestà (1934–2013), Italian film actress
- Rossana Reguillo (1955–2026), Mexican sociologist and academic

== See also ==
- Rosanna (disambiguation)
- Rossano (given name)
