= Érick Vallecillo =

Honduran footballer (born 1980)

Erick Vallecillo
Personal information
- Full name: Erick Cecilio Vallecillo Paguada
- Date of birth: January 29, 1980 (age 46)
- Place of birth: Sonaguera, Honduras
- Position: Defender

Team information
- Current team: Miami United
- Number: 27

Senior career*
Years	Team	Apps	(Gls)
1997–2010	Real España	58	(2)
2011	Municipal		
2011	Atlético Choloma		
2013–	Miami United		

International career^{‡}
2003–2007	Honduras	34	(0)
- * Club domestic league appearances and goals as of 2002 ‡ National team caps and goals as of 2007

Érick Cecilio Vallecillo Paguada (born January 29, 1980) is a Honduran football defender, who currently plays for fourth tier-side Miami United in the USA.

== Club career ==
Vallecillo started his career at Real España with whom he spent the majority of his career. He moved abroad to play the 2011 Clausura in Guatemala with Municipal. In summer 2011 he returned home and joined Atlético Choloma but he was released by the club after the 2011 Apertura. In 2012, he played in the Copa Latina for Blue Stars Honduras.

In 2013, he joined compatriot Saúl Martínez at newly formed Miami United of the National Premier Soccer League.

== International career ==
Vallecillo played at the 1999 FIFA World Youth Championship in Nigeria and made his senior debut for Honduras in an April 2003 CONCACAF Gold Cup qualification match against Trinidad & Tobago and has earned a total of 34 caps, scoring no goals. He has represented his country in 1 FIFA World Cup qualification match and played at the 2005 and 2007 UNCAF Nations Cups as well as at the 2003, 2005 and 2007 CONCACAF Gold Cups.

His final international was an August 2007 friendly match against El Salvador.

== Personal life ==
His brother, Orlin Vallecillo, also plays for Real España. Married to gladiz Carolina sandoval
