= Julio César Suazo =

Honduran footballer (born 1978)

Personal information
- Full name: Julio César Suazo Bernárdez
- Date of birth: 5 October 1978 (age 48)
- Place of birth: La Ceiba, Honduras
- Height: 1.76 m (5 ft 9 in)
- Position: Defender

Senior career*
Years	Team	Apps	(Gls)
1998–2000	Victoria	5	(0)
2000–2004	Wüstenrot Salzburg	65	(0)
2004–2005	Victoria		
2005–2006	Real España		
2007	Hispano		
2007	Eğirdir Belediye Spor		
2008–2009	Huachipato	4	(0)
2009	Savio	3	(0)
2010	Hispano		
2011	Heredia		
2012–2013	Victoria	10	(0)

International career^{‡}
1994	Honduras U-17		
1996	Honduras U-20		
1999–2003	Honduras	4	(0)
- * Club domestic league appearances and goals as of 26 May 2013 ‡ National team caps and goals as of 26 May 2013

Julio César Suazo Bernárdez (born 5 October 1978) is a retired Honduran football defender.

== Club career ==
Nicknamed Pungui, Suazo came through the youth ranks at Victoria and moved to Europe in 2000 to play for SV Wüstenrot Salzburg alongside compatriots Maynor Suazo and Juan Manuel Cárcamo. He also had spells at Real España, whom he left for Hispano before the 2007 Clausura, as well as at Turkish third division side Eğirdir Belediye Spor where he played alongside compatriot Francisco Antonio Pavón. Also, he played a few games for Chilean side Huachipato.

He finally returned to Honduras and joined Savio during the 2009 Apertura after a delay in the release by the Turkish federation, but was the third player to leave the club in September 2009 for not paying his wages. He played the 2011 Clausura for Heredia in Guatemala.

In December 2012, he announced he would retire after the 2013 Clausura but after scoring an own goal against Vida in March 2013, he quit immediately and declared to pursue a coaching career.

== International career ==
He was part of the Honduras U-17 squad at the 1994 CONCACAF U-17 Tournament. In 1996, Suazo was part of the Honduras U-20 squad at the CONCACAF U20 championship in Mexico.

Suazo made his senior debut for Honduras in a May 1999 friendly match against Haiti and has earned a total of 4 caps, scoring no goals. He has represented his country at the 2000 Summer Olympics.

His final international was a June 2003 friendly match against Venezuela.
