= Marvin Sánchez =

Honduran footballer (born 1986)

Personal information
- Full name: Marvin Saúl Sánchez Vallecillo
- Date of birth: 2 November 1986 (age 39)
- Place of birth: Puerto Cortés, Honduras
- Position: Midfielder

Team information
- Current team: Regals SCA
- Number: 11

Senior career*
Years	Team	Apps	(Gls)
2005–2008	Platense		
2009	Motagua	9	(0)
2009	Hispano		
2010	Municipal Limeño	1	(0)
2010–2011	Vida	1	(0)
2011–2012	Atlético Choloma		
2013–	Platense		

International career^{‡}
2005	Honduras U20	1	(0)
2007–2008	Honduras U23	8	(1)
2008	Honduras	1	(0)
- * Club domestic league appearances and goals as of 25 January 2010 ‡ National team caps and goals as of 2008-08-13

Marvin Saúl Sánchez Vallecillo (born 2 November 1986) is a Honduran football midfielder who currently plays for Platense in the Primera Division of Honduras.

== Club career ==
Sánchez started his career at Platense before moving to F.C. Motagua for the 2009 Clausura. He moved abroad to play for Salvadoran side Municipal Limeño in January 2010 and in summer 2010 he joined Vida. In summer 2012, Sánchez reluctantly had to train with Atlético Choloma, since they owned his registration. He later denied any problems with Choloma, though he was said to be close to signing for Real España.

== International career ==
He was part of the Honduras U-20 team at the 2005 World Youth Championship in the Netherlands. Sánchez was also part of the U-23 Honduras national football team who was coached by Colombian trainer Alexis Mendoza but was then coached by Gilberto Yearwood. The U-23 Honduras national football team were CONCACAF champions and qualified to the 2008 Summer Olympics. He made his debut for the senior national side on 22 May 2008 in a friendly against Belize.

== Honours ==
- National team

2008 CONCACAF U-23

== Statistics ==
=== International goals ===
#	Date	Venue	Opponent	Score	Result	Competition
1	2008-03-13	Tampa	Cuba	1 – 0	2–0	2008 CONCACAF Men's Pre-Olympic Tournament
