= Rosano =

Rosano may refer to:

- Pietro Rosano, an Italian politician and lawyer
- Sebastián Rosano, a Uruguayan footballer

== See also ==
- Rossano (disambiguation)
