= Víctor Ortiz Arzú =

Honduran footballer (born 1990)

Víctor Celestino Ortiz Arzú
Personal information
- Full name: Víctor Celestino Ortiz Arzú
- Date of birth: 21 May 1990 (age 36)
- Place of birth: Jutiapa, Honduras
- Position: Forward

Youth career
- 2006–2008: Victoria

Senior career*
Years	Team	Apps	(Gls)
2008–2013	Victoria	153	(42)
2014	Motagua	16	(0)
2014–	Vida	8	(3)

International career
2009	Honduras U-20	2	(0)
- * Club domestic league appearances and goals as of 16 December 2013

Víctor Celestino Ortiz Arzú (Jutiapa, 21 May 1990) is a Honduran football player currently playing for Vida.

He's a striker but he can even plays as winger on both flanks. His main features are speed and shot from distance.

In Honduras his nickname is "La Bala Ortiz" (the bullet), for its great speed.

== Club career ==
Club Deportivo Victoria

After some experience in youth and amateurs teams, Victor Ortiz Arzu has joined the C.D. Victoria's youth team in 2006. After having obtained excellent results, the Club promotes him in the first team in 2007 at the age of 17. His debut in the Honduran first division takes place the following year, in 2008. The 2010 is the year of his consecration, becoming undisputed holder of the blue-white team. With the CD Victoria's team, Victor made himself known for its qualities of strength, speed and shot. Finish his experience with Club Deportivo Victoria after playing over 150 games (league and cup) and scored 42 goals in official matches, a great booty whereas he was not always used as a central striker.

F.C. Motagua

Ended his experience with C.D. Victoria and after receiving various proposals from Honduras and Costa Rica, the young talented Victor Ortiz joins with F.C. Motagua, one of the most important teams in the Central American Country. The debut with his new team takes place in the Clausura tournament 2014. His experience with F.C. Motagua was not so good. The coach preferred experiences strikers instead of Victor and he plays 16 games only (3 of them from the beginning). He concludes the tournament goalless. Victor Ortiz decides to terminate the contract with the F.C. Motagua at the end of the season because of his low coach's consideration.

== International career ==
Ortiz played two games with the Honduras national under-20 football team at the 2009 FIFA U-20 World Cup.
