= Image of Chile Foundation =

- Fundación Imagen de Chile
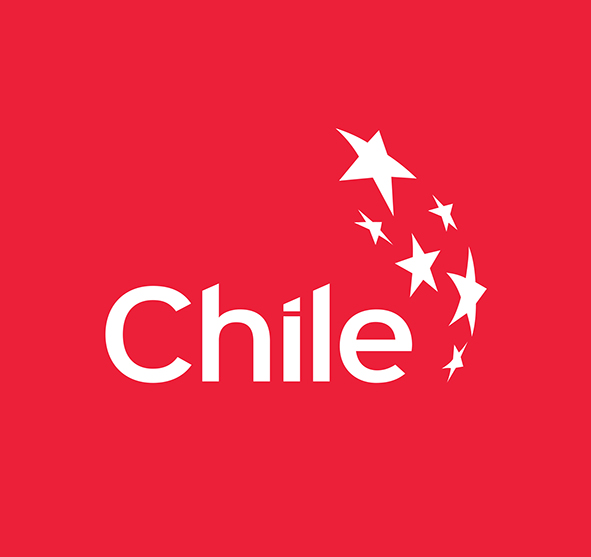
- IoCF

Private organization with public funding overview
- Formed: May 8, 2009
- Superseding Private organization with public funding: Government of Chile, Foreign Relations Ministry (es:Ministerio de Relaciones exteriores de Chile)
- Type: Nation Branding
- Jurisdiction: National
- Headquarters: Monjitas Nº 392, piso 15 Santiago, Chile
- Minister responsible: Alberto van Klaveren
- Website: www.marcachile.cl

The Image of Chile Foundation, or Fundación Imagen de Chile in Spanish, is an organization that coordinates work carried out to promote Chile abroad.

== History ==
The Image of Chile Foundation was founded on 8 May 2009, during the first government of Michelle Bachelet. Its origins date back to the Country Image Project Office, a previous body created in 2007 with similar objectives. The first executive director was Juan Gabriel Valdés.

== Description ==
The mission of the Foundation is to “promote the country internationally" - or manage the nation’s brand ("Marca País") - by guiding, advising and supporting public and private organizations and individuals whose initiatives aim to enhance and promote the image and reputation of Chile.

The Foundation develops alliances in the public and private sectors to promote the distinctive attributes of Chile's identity. It aims to develop opportunities to attract talent, exports, foreign investment, tourism, international relations, social and cultural links, and much more.

== Organization ==
The Foundation is governed by a board of directors in charge of defining its overall policies and courses of action. The board consists of 16 members, including the Minister of Foreign Affairs (who presides), the Minister of the Economy, and the Ministry of Culture, Arts and Cultural Heritage.

Although the Foundation is a private organization, its board of directors is formed and presided over by government ministers, applies and complies with state policies, and is funded by public resources.

Since 2025, the executive director has been María Teresa Saldías.

=== Executive directors ===
- María Teresa Saldías (2025-)
- Rossana Dresdner (2022-2025)
- Constanza Cea (2018-2022)
- Myriam Gomez (2014-2018)
- Blas Tomic (2011-2013)
- Juan Gabriel Valdés (2009-2011)

== See also ==
- Cultural diplomacy
- Nation branding
