= Quiarol Arzú =

Honduran footballer (born 1985)

Personal information
- Full name: Quiarol Lenín Arzú Flores
- Date of birth: 3 March 1985 (age 41)
- Place of birth: Jutiapa, Honduras
- Height: 1.83 m (6 ft 0 in)
- Position: Defender

Senior career*
Years	Team	Apps	(Gls)
2005–2011	Platense		
2011–2013	Marathón		
2013	Hubei China-Kyle	11	(1)
2014	Deportivo Coatepeque		
2014–2016	Parrillas One		
2015–2016	→ Platense (loan)		
2016	Juticalpa F.C.		
2016–2018	Deportivo Guastatoya		

International career^{‡}
2007–2008	Honduras Under-23	10	(0)
2010–2012	Honduras	4	(0)
- * Club domestic league appearances and goals ‡ National team caps and goals as of 30 June 2013

Quiarol Lenín Arzú Flores (born 3 March 1985) is a Honduran football defender who currently plays for Deportivo Guastatoya in the Liga Nacional de Fútbol de Guatemala.

== Club career ==
Arzú began his professional career with Liga Nacional de Honduras side Platense in 2005. He has established himself as one of the top central defenders in Honduras. In February 2009, he went on trial to the Chinese side Beijing Guoan alongside his compatriot Hendry Córdova, but the club decided not to sign them.

Arzú went on trial with D.C. United in early 2010 in hopes of securing a contract with the Major League Soccer club. He joined Marathón in summer 2011.

Arzú transferred to China League One side Hubei China-Kyle in February 2013. He was released in June 2013.

== International career ==
Arzú was part of the U-23 Honduras national football team which was coached by Colombian trainer Alexis Mendoza and later by Gilberto Yearwood. The U-23 Honduras national football team was CONCACAF champions and qualified for the 2008 Summer Olympics.

Arzú made his senior debut for Honduras in an October 2010 friendly match against Guatemala and has, as of July 2012, earned a total of 3 caps, scoring no goals.
