= Roy Posas =

Honduran footballer (born 1984)

Personal information
- Full name: Roy Francisco Posas Ferrufino
- Date of birth: March 14, 1984 (age 42)
- Place of birth: Danlí, Honduras
- Position: Left back

Team information
- Current team: Atlético Choloma
- Number: 26

Youth career
- Motagua

Senior career*
Years	Team	Apps	(Gls)
2003–2005	Motagua		
2005–2006	Municipal Valencia		
2006–2007	Hispano		
2007–2008	Motagua	33	(0)
2009	Olimpia		
2009–2010	Heredia Jaguares	28	(0)
2010–2011	Necaxa		
2011–	Atlético Choloma		(1)

International career
2004	Honduras	4	(0)
- * Club domestic league appearances and goals as of 11 September 2008

Roy Francisco Posas Ferrufino (born 14 March 1984) is a Honduran footballer who plays for Liga Nacional de Honduras club Atlético Choloma as a left back.

== Club career ==
He previously played for Hispano F.C. and integrated that club after F.C. Municipal Valencia sold its category due to financial problems. In 2007, he joined F.C. Motagua.

=== Motagua ===
==== Alcohol abuse ====
Luis Rodas alongside Roy Posas had a bar fight which left the Motagua's board of directors no other choice but to cut them from the team. After this happened he was left a free agent until Olimpia signed him for 2009. In June 2009 he left the club for Guatemalan side Heredia. In April 2010 Posas was fined by Heredia for work abandonment.

He returned to Honduras to play for Necaxa alongside internationals John Alston Bodden and Nery Medina and joined Atlético Choloma in summer 2011.

== International career ==
Posas made his debut for Honduras in a March 2004 friendly match against Panama and has earned a total of 4 caps, scoring no goals.

His final international was a June 2004 friendly match against the United States.

== Personal life ==
Roy Posas, was born in Danlí, El Paraíso, Honduras. He is the son of F.C. Motagua's goalkeeping coach Roy Orlando Posas. Roy Posas is the brother of Atlético Choloma team-mate Aldo Posas.
