= Rossano (given name) =

Rossano is a male Italian given name. Notable people with the name include:

- Rossano Brasi (born 1972), Italian cyclist
- Rossano Brazzi (1916–1994), Italian actor
- Rossano Ercolini, Italian teacher and grassroots environmentalist
- Rossano Galtarossa (born 1972), Italian competition rower and Olympic champion
- Rossano Rubicondi (1972–2021), Italian actor and model, fourth husband of Ivana Trump

== See also ==
- Rossana (given name)
- Rossano (disambiguation)
