= 2004–05 Honduran Liga Nacional de Ascenso =

Liga de Ascenso
- Season: 2004–05
- Champions: Apertura: Deportes Savio; Clausura: Hispano
- Promoted: Hispano
- All statistics correct as of 3 July 2005.

The 2004–05 Honduran Liga Nacional de Ascenso was the 38th season of the Second level in Honduran football and the third one under the name Liga Nacional de Ascenso. Under the management of Carlos Martínez, Hispano won the tournament after defeating Deportes Savio in the promotion series and obtained promotion to the 2005–06 Honduran Liga Nacional.

== Apertura ==
=== Postseason ===
==== Quarterfinals ====
November 2004 1st leg	Atlético Esperanzano	1–0	Deportes Savio	La Esperanza, Intibucá
				Stadium: Estadio Romualdo Bueso

21 November 2004 2nd leg	Deportes Savio	3–1	Atlético Esperanzano	Santa Rosa de Copán, Copán
				Stadium: Estadio Sergio Antonio Reyes

- Deportes Savio won 3–2 on aggregate.

November 2004 1st leg	Juticalpa Tulín	1–2	Social Sol	Olancho

21 November 2004 2nd leg	Social Sol	6–1	Juticalpa Tulín	Olanchito, Yoro
				Stadium: Estadio San Jorge

- Social Sol won 8–2 on aggregate.

November 2004 1st leg	Arsenal	0–0	Águilas del Motagua	Roatán, Bay Islands
				Stadium: Coxen Hole Stadium

21 November 2004 2nd leg	Águilas del Motagua	0–0 (2–4 p)	Arsenal	Tegucigalpa, Francisco Morazán

- Águilas del Motagua 0–0 Arsenal on aggregate. Arsenal won 4–2 on penalties.

November 2004 1st leg	Deportes Concepción	1–0	Real Maya	San Marcos, Ocotepeque

21 November 2004 2nd leg	Real Maya	1–1	Deportes Concepción

- Deportes Concepción won 2–1 on aggregate.

==== Semifinals ====
28 November 2004 1st leg	Arsenal	1–0	Deportes Savio	Roatán, Bay Islands
				Stadium: Coxen Hole Stadium

5 December 2004 2nd leg	Deportes Savio	2–0	Arsenal	Santa Rosa de Copán, Copán
				Stadium: Estadio Sergio Antonio Reyes

- Deportes Savio won 2–1 on aggregate.

28 November 2004 1st leg	Deportes Concepción	0–0	Social Sol	San Marcos, Ocotepeque

5 December 2004 2nd leg	Social Sol	3–1	Deportes Concepción	Olanchito, Yoro
				Stadium: Estadio San Jorge

- Social Sol won 3–1 on aggregate.

==== Final ====
12 December 2004 1st leg	Social Sol	2–1	Deportes Savio	Olanchito, Yoro
				Stadium: Estadio San Jorge

19 December 2004 2nd leg	Deportes Savio	5–2	Social Sol	Santa Rosa de Copán, Copán
				Stadium: Estadio Sergio Antonio Reyes

- Deportes Savio won 6–4 on aggregate.

== Clausura ==
=== Postseason ===
==== Final ====
5 June 2005 1st leg	Hispano	3–0	Deportes Savio	Comayagua, Comayagua
	Goal

12 June 2005 2nd leg	Deportes Savio	3–0	Hispano	Santa Rosa de Copán, Copán
				Stadium: Estadio Sergio Antonio Reyes

- Deportes Savio 3–3 Hispano on aggregate. Hispano won 6–5 on penalties.

== Promotion ==
26 June 2005 1st leg	Hispano	0–0	Deportes Savio	Comayagua, Comayagua

3 July 2005 2nd leg	Deportes Savio	1–1	Hispano	San Pedro Sula, Cortés

- Deportes Savio 1–1 Hispano on aggregate. Hispano won 8–7 on penalties.
