= Rony Flores =

Honduran footballer (born 1984)

Personal information
- Full name: Rony Alberto Flores Sánchez
- Date of birth: 28 September 1984 (age 42)
- Place of birth: Tela, Honduras
- Position: Striker

Youth career
- Olimpia

Senior career*
Years	Team	Apps	(Gls)
2003–2004	Real Juventud		
2007–2008	Universidad Choluteca		
2009	Bella Vista	11	(3)
2009	Atenas	15	(6)
2010	Sud América	9	(1)
2010–2011	Marathón	30	(14)
2011–2012	Shenzhen Ruby	16	(3)
2012–2013	Marathón	27	(9)
2014–	Victoria	16	(4)

International career^{‡}
2010	Honduras	1	(0)
- * Club domestic league appearances and goals as of 2013 ‡ National team caps and goals as of 2013

Rony Alberto Flores Sánchez (Spanish pronunciation: [ˈroni ˈfloɾes]; born 28 September 1984) is a Honduran football striker.

== Club career ==
Rony Flores debuted on 24 August 2003 with Real Juventud, in the game that his team lost 1–3 against Motagua in Santa Bárbara. Flores went to United States legally. After playing in New Orleans, he traveled to Uruguay and was hired by the Bella Vista. He went also through Atenas de San Carlos and Sud América.

In 2010, Rony Flores joined Marathón. His successful spell at Marathon made Flores was hired by Shenzhen Ruby in 2011. After a year, he returned to Honduras to rejoin Marathón.

== International career ==
Flores made one international appearance for Honduras, playing a friendly against Panama in 2010.
