= Rigoberto Padilla =

Honduran footballer (born 1985)

Personal information
- Full name: Rigoberto Padilla Reyes
- Date of birth: 1 December 1985 (age 40)
- Place of birth: Tegucigalpa, Honduras
- Height: 1.81 m (5 ft 11 in)
- Position: Midfielder

Team information
- Current team: Olimpia

Senior career*
Years	Team	Apps	(Gls)
2005–2006	Valencia		
2006–2008	Hispano	30	(9)
2009–2011	Olimpia	27	(2)
2011–2012	Victoria		
2013–	Olimpia		

International career^{‡}
2008–2008	Honduras U-23	8	(0)
2008–2009	Honduras	3	(0)
- * Club domestic league appearances and goals as of 4 December 2008 ‡ National team caps and goals as of 8 July 2009

Rigoberto Padilla Reyes (born 1 December 1985) is a Honduran footballer who plays for Olimpia.

== Club career ==
Padilla started his career at Valencia but was subject of controversy since Valencia claimed he was sold to Olimpia by Hispano in 2009 while still on Valencia's books.

His brothers, Esdras and Eleazar Padilla, also played for Hispano. Padilla, alongside Esdras and Eleazar was transferred to Motagua in 2008. But the transfer was unsuccessful for Rigoberto Padilla and he stayed to play for Hispano. He then joined Olimpia before moving to Victoria for the 2011 Apertura.

He left Victoria and returned to Olimpia for the 2013 Clausura.

== International career ==
Padilla was a part of the U-23 team that won the 2008 CONCACAF Men's Pre-Olympic Tournament and played at the 2008 Summer Olympics.

He made his senior debut for Honduras in a friendly against Colombia on 26 March 2008 and has earned a total of 3 caps, scoring no goals. He has represented his country 2009 CONCACAF Gold Cup, where he played his final international against the USA.
