= Jairo Ríos =

Colombian football manager

Personal information
- Date of birth: 26 October 1949
- Place of birth: Colombia

Managerial career
- Years: Team
- 1994–1995: Deportivo Antioquia
- 1995–1996: Independiente Medellín
- 2004: FC Municipal Valencia
- 2005: Pumas UNAH
- 2005: CD Marathón
- 2006: CDS Vida
- 2008–2010: Haiti
- 2011: Platense FC
- 2013: CD Real Sociedad
- 2013–2014: Juticalpa FC
- 2014: CD Águila
- 2015–2016: CD Marathón
- 2017: Universidad SC
- 2017–2018: Platense FC

Jairo Ríos Rendón (born 26 October 1949) is a Colombian former football manager.

== Early life ==
He attended Liceo Antioqueño in Colombia. He studied business administration.

== Career ==
In 1994, he was appointed manager of Honduran side Deportivo Antioquia. In 1995, he was appointed manager of Colombian side Independiente Medellín. In 2004, he was appointed manager of Honduran side FC Municipal Valencia. In 2005, he was appointed manager of Honduran side Pumas UNAH. After that, he was appointed manager of Honduran side CD Marathón. In 2006, he was appointed manager of Honduran side CDS Vida. In 2008, he was appointed manager of the Haiti national football team. In 2011, he was appointed manager of Honduran side Platense FC. In 2013, he was appointed manager of Honduran side CD Real Sociedad. After that, he was appointed manager of Honduran side Juticalpa FC. In 2014, he was appointed manager of Salvadoran side CD Águila. In 2015, he returned to Honduran side CD Marathón. In 2017, he was appointed manager of Guatemalan side Universidad SC. After that, he returned to Honduran side Platense FC.

== Personal life ==
He is a native of Antioquia, Colombia. He has worked as a football commentator for an American radio program. He has three brothers. One of them, Juan Guillermo Ríos, has worked as a journalist.
