= Esaú Flores =

Honduran footballer (born 1997)

Personal information
- Full name: Edward Esaú Flores Martínez
- Date of birth: 29 November 1997 (age 28)
- Place of birth: Honduras
- Position: Goalkeeper

Team information
- Current team: Victoria
- Number: 23

Youth career
- Victoria

Senior career*
Years	Team	Apps	(Gls)
2015–	Victoria	15	
- * Club domestic league appearances and goals as of 08:35, 16 December 2023 ‡ National team caps and goals as of 08:00, 15 December 2023

Edward Esaú Flores Martínez (born 29 November 1997) is a Honduran professional footballer who plays as a goalkeeper for Victoria

== Club career ==
He started his career in the reserves and participated in all his training to be a XI goalkeeper for the club. He eventually made his debut in the league match against Real Espana for the club.
