= Rossano (disambiguation) =

Rossano is a town and frazione in the province of Cosenza, Calabria, southern Italy.

Rossano may also refer to:

- Rossano Veneto, a town in the province of Vicenza, Veneto, Italy
- Rossano di Vaglio, a place in the province of Potenza, Basilicata, Italy
- Rossano Gospels, a 6th-century illuminated manuscript Gospel Book

== People ==
- Rossano (given name), an Italian male given name
- Antonio Rossano (1940–2011), Italian journalist
- Fausto Rossano (1946–2012), Italian physician
- Federigo Rossano (1835–1912), Italian painter
- Feliciano Rossano (born 1924), Uruguayan boxer
- Geoffrey Rossano (died 2021), American author and historian
- Giorgio Rossano (1939–2016), Italian footballer
- María Julia Alcoba Rossano (born 1938), Uruguayan activist
- Michele Rossano (1907–?), Italian magistrate
- Herval Rossano (1935–2007), Brazilian TV actor and director

== See also ==
- Rosano (disambiguation)
- Rossana (disambiguation)
