= David Velásquez =

Honduran footballer (born 1989)

Personal information
- Full name: José David Velásquez Colón
- Date of birth: 8 December 1989 (age 36)
- Place of birth: La Ceiba, Honduras
- Height: 1.83 m (6 ft 0 in)
- Position: Centre back

Team information
- Current team: Real Sociedad

Senior career*
Years	Team	Apps	(Gls)
2009–2015	Victoria		
2014–2015	→ Nacional (loan)		
2016–2019	Real España	51	(0)
2019–2020	Real Sociedad	2	(0)
2020–2021	Vida		
2021–	Victoria		

International career^{‡}
2012	Honduras U23	5	(0)
2012–	Honduras	5	(0)
- * Club domestic league appearances and goals ‡ National team caps and goals as of 18:17, 20 September 2019 (UTC)

José David Velásquez Colón (born 8 December 1989) is a Honduran footballer who plays for Victoria in the Honduran first division.

== Club career ==
Velásquez started his career with hometown club Victoria and has not changed clubs since. In December 2012 however, it was rumoured Velásquez was ready to join Major League Soccer club Seattle Sounders FC.

== International career ==
Velásquez was picked for the Honduras Olympic team which competed in the 2012 Summer Olympics. He made his senior debut for Honduras in an April 2012 friendly match against Costa Rica and has, as of February 2013, earned a total of 2 caps, scoring no goals.
