= 2003–04 Honduran Liga Nacional de Ascenso =

Liga de Ascenso
- Season: 2003–04
- Champions: Municipal Valencia
- Promoted: Municipal Valencia
- All statistics correct as of 23 April 2004.

The 2003–04 Honduran Liga Nacional de Ascenso was the 37th season of the Second level in Honduran football and the second one under the name Liga Nacional de Ascenso. Under the management of Carlos Padilla, F.C. Municipal Valencia won the tournament after defeating Hispano in the final series and obtained promotion to the 2004–05 Honduran Liga Nacional.

== Postseason ==
=== Quarterfinals ===
5 March 2004 1st leg	Municipal Valencia	1–0	Real Sociedad	Tegucigalpa, Francisco Morazán
				Stadium: Estadio Tiburcio Carías Andino

14 March 2004 2nd leg	Real Sociedad	1–1	Municipal Valencia	Tocoa, Colón
				Stadium: Estadio Francisco Martínez Durón

- Municipal Valencia won 2–1 on aggregated.

7 March 2004 1st leg	América Marathón	1–0	Atlético Independiente	San Juan Pueblo, Atlántida

14 March 2004 2nd leg	Atlético Independiente	2–1 (4–3 p)	América Marathón	Siguatepeque, Comayagua
				Stadium: Estadio Roberto Martínez Ávila

- Atlético Independiente 2–2 América Marathón on aggregated. Atlético Independiente won 4–3 on penalty shoot-outs.

7 March 2004 1st leg	Social Sol	0–0	Atlético Esperanzano	Olanchito, Yoro
				Stadium: Estadio San Jorge

14 March 2004 2nd leg	Atlético Esperanzano	2–1	Social Sol	La Esperanza, Intibucá
				Stadium: Estadio Romualdo Bueso

- Atlético Esperanzano won 2–1 on aggregated.

7 March 2004 1st leg	Hispano	1–0	Deportes Savio	Comayagua, Comayagua

14 March 2004 2nd leg	Deportes Savio	2–2	Hispano	Santa Rosa de Copán, Copán
				Stadium: Estadio Sergio Antonio Reyes

- Hispano won 3–2 on aggregated.

=== Semifinals ===
21 March 2004 1st leg	Hispano	1–0	Atlético Esperanzano	Comayagua, Comayagua

28 March 2004 2nd leg	Atlético Esperanzano	2–1 (1–3 p)	Hispano	La Esperanza, Intibucá
				Stadium: Estadio Romualdo Bueso

- Atlético Esperanzano 2–2 Hispano on aggregated. Hispano won 3–1 on penalty shoot-outs.

March 2004 1st leg	Municipal Valencia	2–0	Atlético Independiente	Tegucigalpa, Francisco Morazán
				Stadium: Estadio Tiburcio Carías Andino

3 April 2004 2nd leg	Atlético Independiente	1–1	Municipal Valencia	Siguatepeque, Comayagua
				Stadium: Estadio Roberto Martínez Ávila

- Municipal Valencia won 3–1 on aggregated.

=== Final ===
18 April 2004 1st leg	Hispano	0–0	Municipal Valencia	Comayagua, Comayagua

23 April 2004 2nd leg	Municipal Valencia	2–0	Hispano	Tegucigalpa, Francisco Morazán
	Valladares 17'; Arrasola 38'			Stadium: Estadio Tiburcio Carías Andino

- Municipal Valencia won 2–0 on aggregated.
