= Roy Orlando Posas =

Honduran footballer (1951–2021)

Personal information
- Full name: Roy Orlando Posas Fuentes
- Date of birth: 6 March 1951
- Place of birth: Olanchito, Yoro, Honduras
- Date of death: 1 May 2021 (aged 70)
- Place of death: Tegucigalpa, Francisco Morazán, Honduras
- Position: Goalkeeper

Senior career*
Years	Team	Apps	(Gls)
1969–1975	Atlético Indio		
197?	Marathón		
- * Club domestic league appearances and goals

Roy Orlando Posas Fuentes (6 March 1951 – 1 May 2021) was a Honduran football player and manager. He played as a goalkeeper for Atlético Indio and Marathón throughout the 1970s as well as being one of the main goalkeeper coaches within Honduras.

== Career as a player ==
Posas made his debut during the 1969–70 Honduran Liga Nacional as the secondary goalkeeper Atlético Indio. He would become the main goalkeeper following the retirement of Yuyuga Flores and played for the club until their relegation following the 1964–75 Honduran Liga Nacional. He then played for Marathón as a reserve goalkeeper for the rest of his career. Following this, he played as a reserve goalkeeper for Marathón until his retirement.

== Later life ==
Following retirement, he returned to football as a goalkeeping coach, first beginning with his former club of Marathón beginning in the mid-1990s to the early 2010s, helping the club achieve many titles in 1997, 2002, 2007 and 2011. Known as the first Honduran goalkeeping coach, training up goalkeepers that would go on to represent Honduras internationally. His most significant role came when he was called up to be the goalkeeping coach for the Honduras national football team to be part of their delegations at the 2000 Summer Olympics where the Bicolor narrowly missed the knockout stage by just a single point. He later served as the goalkeeping coach for the following 2001 Copa América where Honduras would achieve their best result in any edition of the Copa América at third place. He continued serving as the main goalkeeping coach into the 2018 FIFA World Cup qualifiers where Honduras failed to qualify.

Posas later had two sons of his life, both of whom later became footballers: Aldo and Roy Posas. He also served as an educator within the Ministry of Education from 1980 until 2015.

Posas died on 1 May 2021 at the Instituto Hondureño de Seguridad Social hospital from COVID-19 during his tenure as the goalkeeping coach of Real Sociedad.
