= Marco Mejía =

Honduran footballer (born 1975)

Marco Antonio Mejía
Personal information
- Full name: Marco Antonio Mejía Caballero
- Date of birth: 26 March 1975 (age 51)
- Place of birth: San Pedro Sula, Honduras
- Positions: Defender; midfielder

Team information
- Current team: Juticalpa

Senior career*
Years	Team	Apps	(Gls)
1995–2001	Platense		
2002–2003	Real España		
2003–2004	Atlético Olanchano		
2004–2005	Vida		
2005–2006	Municipal Valencia		
2006–2007	Hispano		
2008	Atlético Olanchano	7	(0)
2008–2012	Deportes Savio		
2013–	Juticalpa		

International career
2000–2001	Honduras	6	(0)
- * Club domestic league appearances and goals

Marco Antonio Mejía Caballero (born 26 March 1975) is a Honduran footballer who currently plays for Juticalpa in the Honduran Second Division.

== Club career ==
Maco played for several clubs in the Honduran National League over a career spanning 17-years, his last Liga Nacional club being Deportes Savio. At 37 years of age, Mejía joined Juticalpa for the 2013 Clausura.

Team	Season	Games	Start	Sub	Goal	YC	RC
Atlético Olanchano	2007-08 C	7	2	5	0	1	1
Deportes Savio	2008-09 A	16	16	0	0	3	0
Deportes Savio	2008-09 C	14	14	0	0	3	1
Deportes Savio	2009-10 A	16	14	2	0	2	0

== International career ==
Mejía made his debut for Honduras in a May 2000 friendly match against Canada and has earned a total of 6 caps, scoring no goals. He has represented his country in 2 FIFA World Cup qualification matches and played at the 2001 UNCAF Nations Cups

His final international was a May 2001 UNCAF Nations Cup match against El Salvador.
