= Mario Romero (footballer) =

Argentine footballer

Personal information
- Full name: Mario Antonio Romero
- Date of birth: March 15, 1980 (age 46)
- Place of birth: Buenos Aires, Argentina
- Position: Striker

Team information
- Current team: Can Tho F.C.

Senior career*
Years	Team	Apps	(Gls)
2007–2009	Platense		
2009	Dinamo Tirana	5	(2)
2011–	Can Tho F.C.		
- * Club domestic league appearances and goals

Mario Antonio Romero (born 15 March 1980 in Buenos Aires) is an Argentine football striker who currently plays for Dinamo Tirana in the Albanian Superliga.

== Career ==
Romero signed for Dinamo Tirana on January 28, 2009, after initially going on a short trial at the Albanian club on January 28, 2009. He signed a contract that would keep him at the club until the end of the season with an option of another year. During his trial he followed the Dinamo Tirana squad to Turkey during the winter break where he played friendly games, including a match against Terek Grozny of Russia where he scored a goal.
