= Adalid Puerto =

Honduran football goalkeeper (born 1979)

Personal information
- Full name: José Adalid Puerto Lozano
- Date of birth: 14 September 1979 (age 47)
- Place of birth: Olanchito, Honduras
- Height: 1.80 m (5 ft 11 in)
- Position: Goalkeeper

Team information
- Current team: Platense
- Number: 12

Senior career*
| Years | Team | Apps | (Gls) |
| 2000–2007 | Platense | | |
| 2008 | Real Juventud | 8 | (0) |
| 2009 | Platense | 3 | (0) |
| 2009–2010 | Marathón | 4 | (0) |
| 2013–present | Platense | 16 | (0) |

International career^{‡}
| 2006 | Honduras | 2 | (0) |
- * Club domestic league appearances and goals as of 2007 ‡ National team caps and goals as of 2007

José Adalid Puerto Lozano (born 14 September 1979) is a Honduran football goalkeeper, who currently plays for Platense in the Liga Nacional de Fútbol de Honduras.

== Club career ==
A Platense-player, Puerto also played for Real Juventud and Marathón. He was ruled out of the game for three years due to injury sustained while training with Marathón.

In that period, he went to the US and became a business man but surprisingly returned to the game to play for Platense again after starting the 2013 Clausura as goalkeeping coach but soon ended up as the team's number one goalkeeper.

== International career ==
Puerto made his debut for Honduras in an August 2006 friendly match against Venezuela and has earned a total of 2 caps, scoring no goals. He was a non-playing squad member at the 2007 CONCACAF Gold Cup.

His other, final, international was an October 2006 friendly match against Guatemala.
