= Sebastián Rosano =

Uruguayan footballer (born 1987)

Personal information
- Full name: Sebastián Rosano Escobar
- Date of birth: May 25, 1987 (age 39)
- Place of birth: Rivera, Uruguay
- Height: 1.78 m (5 ft 10 in)
- Position: Winger

Team information
- Current team: C.D. Olimpia
- Number: 15

Senior career*
Years	Team	Apps	(Gls)
2006–2007	Montevideo Wanderers	34	(4)
2008	→ Cagliari (loan)	0	(0)
2008–2009	→ Tigre (loan)	29	(1)
2009–2011	Racing Club	11	(0)
2010–2011	→ Montevideo Wanderers (loan)	21	(0)
2011–2012	Peñarol	12	(3)
2012–	C.D. Olimpia	13	(1)

International career^{‡}
2008–	Uruguay	1	(0)
- * Club domestic league appearances and goals as of 1 November 2012 ‡ National team caps and goals as of 11:24, 4 October 2009 (UTC)

Sebastián Rosano Escobar (born 25 May 1987 in Rivera) is a Uruguayan footballer. He plays for C.D. Olimpia in the Liga Nacional de Honduras.

Rosano began his professional playing career with Montevideo Wanderersin Uruguay. In 2008, he had a short loan spell with Italian side Cagliari.

Later in 2008 Rosano joined Tigre of Argentina and in 2009 he joined Racing Club.
