= Jutiapa, Honduras =

Jutiapa
- Nickname: Juticalpa
- Location in Honduras
- Coordinates: 15°44′N 86°31′W
- Country: Honduras
- Department: Atlántida
- Foundation: 1 June 1923; 103 years ago

Government
  - Mayor: Oscar Arnulfo Ayala Bautista (PL)

Area
  - Total: 533.83 km^{2} (206.11 sq mi)

Population (2015)
  - Total: 35,176
  - Density: 65.894/km^{2} (170.66/sq mi)
- Postal code: 31401

Jutiapa is a municipality in the Honduran department of Atlántida.

== Demographics ==
2010 population by age

| | 0–3 | 4–6 | 7–12 | 13–17 | 18–24 | 25–64 | 65+ | Total |
|---|---|---|---|---|---|---|---|---|
| Men | 2,007 | 1,487 | 3,009 | 2,155 | 2,155 | 5,437 | 733 | 16,985 |
| Women | 2,038 | 1,484 | 2,944 | 2,059 | 1,947 | 5,658 | 726 | 16,858 |
| Juatiapa | 4,046 | 2,972 | 5,953 | 4,215 | 4,103 | 11,096 | 1,459 | 33,842 |
