= Edwin Pavón =

Honduran football manager)

Personal information
- Full name: Edwin Roberto Pavón León
- Date of birth: 6 November 1962
- Place of birth: La Lima, Honduras
- Date of death: 28 December 2018 (aged 56)
- Place of death: La Lima, Honduras

Managerial career
- Years: Team
- 2000–2001: CD Olimpia
- 2003: Honduras
- 2004: CSD Xelajú MC
- 2005: CD Motagua
- 2006–2007: FC Municipal Valencia
- 2007–2008: Atlético Olanchano
- 2008–2009: CD Real Juventud
- 2011–2012: Atlético Choloma

Edwin Roberto Pavón León (6 November 1962 - 28 December 2018) was a Honduran football manager.

== Life and career ==
He was born on 6 November 1962 in La Lima, Honduras. He is a native of La Lima, Honduras. He attended university in Honduras. He obtained a law degree. He worked as a college professor for the Universidad Nacional Autónoma de Honduras. He was worked in politics in Honduras. He was nicknamed the "Philosopher of Football". In 2000, he was appointed manager of Honduran side CD Olimpia. He helped the club win the league. In 2003, he was appointed manager of the Honduras national football team. He managed the team at the 2003 CONCACAF Gold Cup. In 2004, he was appointed manager of Guatemalan side CSD Xelajú MC.

In 2005, he was appointed manager of Honduran side CD Motagua. In 2006, he was appointed manager of Honduran side FC Municipal Valencia. In 2007, he was appointed manager of Honduran side Atlético Olanchano. He suffered relegation while managing the club. In 2008, he was appointed manager of Honduran side CD Real Juventud. He suffered relegation while managing the club. In 2011, he was appointed manager of Honduran side Atlético Choloma. He died on 28 December 2018 in La Lima, Honduras.
