= Rossana Dresdner =

Chilean writer (born 1961)

- Born: 1961 (age 64–65)
- Education: University of Chile, Uppsala University, Diego Portales University
- Occupations: Journalist, writer
- Writing career
- Genres: Novel, chronicle
- Notable awards: Santiago Municipal Literature Award (2025)

Rossana Dresdner Cid (born 1961) is an American-born Chilean journalist and writer. She was the executive director of Imagen de Chile Foundation from 2022 to 2025.

== Early life and education ==
Dresdner was born in Boston, Massachusetts, USA and moved to Chile. Her family was exiled to Uppsala, Sweden, from Valdivia after the military coup in Chile (1973).

She went to school in Sweden and faced the language barrier during the first few weeks. After living in Sweden for 12 years, she returned to Chile and studied journalism. Dresdner graduated in Social Communication from the University of Chile and studied Economic History at Uppsala University, Sweden. She has a degree in Creative writing from Diego Portales University.

== Career ==
Pasajeros en Tránsito (2012) was her first novel, and Honorables (2020) was her second. Published by El Mostrador, her chronicle Brigada Dignidad was in Chile Crónico 2020. Throughout her career in journalism, Dresdner has contributed opinion columns and cultural commentary to major Chilean media outlets. Her experiences include communication management, corporate affairs, and political communication, and she is an expert in corporate and political-civic communication. Her third novel, Tu memoria en mis ojos, was published in 2024. She won the 2025 Santiago Municipal Literature Award for the third novel, which is a novel about Alzheimer's disease, identity, memory, healing, and maternal love.

She became the executive director of the Fundación Imagen País under the Ministry of Foreign Affairs in January 2023. It was decided by unanimous vote to remove Dresdner from the position of executive director by the board of directors of the Imagen de Chile Foundation. The position was replaced by lawyer María Teresa Saldías Morales. She left the Imagen de Chile Foundation as an executive director in 2025.

== Awards and honours ==
- 2025, Santiago Municipal Literature Award

== Bibliography ==
=== Novels ===
- Pasajeros en Tránsito (2012)
- Honorables (2020)
- Tu memoria en mis ojos (2024)

=== Chronicles ===
- Mi Primer periodo en Suecia
- La Brigada Dignidad (2020)
