= Hendry Córdova =

Honduran footballer (born 1984)

Personal information
- Full name: Hendry Alexander Córdova Martínez
- Date of birth: 11 June 1984 (age 42)
- Place of birth: San Pedro Sula, Honduras
- Position: Midfielder

Team information
- Current team: Olimpia
- Number: 23

Youth career
- Platense

Senior career*
Years	Team	Apps	(Gls)
2007–	Platense		
- Olimpia
- * Club domestic league appearances and goals as of 16 October 2011 ‡ National team caps and goals as of 15 December 2012

Hendry Alexander Córdova Martínez (born 11 June 1984) is a Honduran footballer who currently plays as a midfielder for Olimpia in the Honduran National League.

== Club career ==
He spent the majority of his career at Platense. In February 2009, Córdova went on trial to Chinese side Beijing Guoan but the club decided not to sign him. In March 2010 Córdova was among four teammates who were seriously injured in a car accident after leaving training, breaking his right thigh.

=== Career statistics ===
Club	Season	League		Continental		Total	
Club	Season	Apps	Goals	Apps	Goals	Apps	Goals
Platense	2010 Apertura	4	0	—		4	0
Platense	2011 Apertura	12	1	—		12	1

== International career ==
Córdoba made his debut for Honduras in an April 2012 friendly match against Costa Rica and has, as of December 2012, earned a total of 1 cap, scoring no goals.
