= F.C. Municipal Valencia =

Honduran football club

Valencia
- Full name: Futbol Club Municipal Valencia
- Nickname(s): Los Potros; Naranjas
- Founded: 2002
- Ground: Estadio El Birichiche, Tegucigalpa, Honduras
- Capacity: 3,500
- Chairman: Vicente Williams
- League: Liga de Ascenso de Honduras
- 2012–2013: 6° (Zona Centro-Sur-Oriente B) (Last)
| Home colours | Away colours |

Municipal Valencia is a Honduran football club based in Tegucigalpa, Honduras.

They however played their home games in the Estadio Fausto Flores Lagos, Choluteca when they were in the Honduran first division.

== History ==
Municipal Valencia was founded by Jorge Jimenez and Vicente Williams Zelaya. After their second season in the 2nd Division league (Liga de Ascenso), Municipal Valencia won their league titles on April 23, 2004 against Hispano (2–0 in the global score) and therefore was promoted to the 1st Division National League (Liga Nacional). ) Their best league position was third place in the 2006 (Clausura). While in the 1st Division National League, Andres Salinas was the President, David Ignacio (Nacho) Williams was the Vice-President, Vicente (Chente) Williams Z. was the Coordinator, Phillippe Ahmadi Williams (Filip) was the Treasurer among others. The team was beloved by the locals in Choluteca as well as their well known Treasurer (Phillippe Ahmadi Williams), but after many pleas to have the team transfer to Choluteca as their permanent residence and not doing so, the team would lose most of their sponsors. Before the beginning of the 2006–07 Apertura season Valencia sold its category to Hispano for three million lempiras due to financial debt to financial institutions generated by the salaries of the players and coaches as well as the costs relating to the maintenance of the team. Most of the team's members became members of Hispano such as manager Edwin Pavón and many of the players including Luis Rodas, Kerpo de León, Gilberto Santos, "Tuché", Marco Mejía, Henry Jiménez, Johnny Galdámez, Gerson Amaral, Rigoberto Padilla and Roy Posas. They were relegated to the liga de ascenso de Honduras.

== Achievements ==
- Liga de Ascenso
  - Winners (1): 2003–04

== League and Playoffs Performance ==
1994–present
| Season | Position | GP | W | D | L | GF | GA | PTS | Playoffs | Pl. | W | D | L | GF | GA | PTS |
|---|---|---|---|---|---|---|---|---|---|---|---|---|---|---|---|---|
| 2004–05 Apertura | 8th | 18 | 4 | 7 | 7 | 19 | 17 | 25 | did not qualify | – | – | – | – | – | – | – |
| 2004–05 Clausura | 9th | 17 | 3 | 9 | 5 | 10 | 12 | 18 | did not qualify | – | – | – | – | – | – | – |
| 2005–06 Apertura | 8th | 18 | 5 | 5 | 8 | 15 | 22 | 20 | did not qualify | – | – | – | – | – | – | – |
| 2005–06 Clausura | 3rd | 18 | 9 | 3 | 6 | 20 | 13 | 30 | Semi-finals | 2 | 0 | 1 | 1 | 1 | 4 | 1 |

== Managers ==
- (Colombia) Jairo Rios (2004)
- (Honduras) Rodolfo Richardson Smith (2004–2005)
