= Comayagua F.C. =

Honduran football club

Comayagua
- Full name: Comayagua Fútbol Club
- Nickname: Los Burritos (The Donkeys)
- Founded: 3 July 1945; 80 years ago
- Ground: Estadio Carlos Miranda; Comayagua, Honduras
- Capacity: 10,000
- Chairman: Wilfredo Ramires, Donaldo Caceres
- Manager: Rosbin Padilla
- League: Liga de Ascenso
Home colours

Comayagua Fútbol Club (Spanish pronunciation: [komaˈʝaɣwa]) was a Honduran football club, based in Comayagua, Honduras.

The club was founded in 1945 as Hispano Galvez, eventually dropping "Galvez". The Hispano club played from 2005 to 2011 in the Honduran first division, and was dissolved in 2012 due to unsustainable financial circumstances. Management then purchased the second division franchise of Atlético Pinares and rebranded it as Comayagua FC.

== History ==
=== Hispano ===
Hispano was founded on 3 July 1945 by Miguel Bulnes, Tafael Ruiz and Manuel Bulnes in a small barrio named Abajo located in Comayagua. The club was originally named Hispano Galvez in honor of Juan Manuel Galvez, the Honduran president at that time. The club changed their named to Hispano when Galvez's presidency was over.

In 1950, Hispano won a championship when they were part of an independent league in the north coast of Honduras. Their greatest achievement came on July 5, 2005 when they earned promotion to the top division by beating Deportes Savio in the final.

=== Liga Nacional de Fútbol de Honduras ===
The club was promoted to the top division in 2004–05 but was later relegated in the 2005–06 season after finishing in last place.

=== Municipal Valencia's franchise ===
That same year, Hispano bought Valencia's category in the league for 3 million lempiras. Most of Valencia's members like Luis Rodas, Kerpo de Leon, Gilberto Santos, Tushe, Marco Mejia, Henry Jimenez, Johny Galdamez, Gerson Amaral, Rigoberto Padilla and Roy Posas became players for Hispano.

Hispano surprised everyone including their fans and directors during their third season. They manage to qualify to the playoffs and at the same time became one of the most difficult teams to beat in the Honduran league. In their fourth season, the club ended in fifth place in the standing and didn't qualify to the playoffs. In the 2007 Apertura season, the team started the season well but faltered at the end finishing in seventh place and missing the playoffs for a second year in a row. Edwin Pavon, the coach who led them to the playoffs for the first time was fired and was replaced by Hector Vargas.

=== Relegation and renamed Comayagua FC ===
In April 2011 Hispano was relegated to the second division after finishing last in the 2010–11 season. In July 2012 the Honduran football arbitration court (Tribunal de Arbitraje de Fútbol) has set due the accumulated debts of the club, which have reached almost one million lempiras (at the time 40,000 EUR / 31,500 GBP / 51,000 USD) to be paid within five days. This target proved out of scope for the club. Therefore, management has decided to dissolve Hispano FC and purchase the franchise of Atlético Pinares of San Marcos de Colón of Choluteca and rebrand it as Comayagua FC.

== Achievements ==
- Liga de Ascenso
  - Winners (1): 2004–05 C
  - Runners-up (1): 2003–04
- Comayagua Championship
  - Winners (1): 1955

== Liga Nacional performance ==
Hispano F.C. spent 6 seasons (12 tournaments) in the top level of Honduran football from 2005 until their relegation in 2011. Their best performance occurred in the Apertura tournament of the 2006–07 season when they reached the semifinals, losing 2–6 on aggregated against F.C. Motagua.

Season	Pos.	Record	Goals	Playoffs
2005–06 A	7th	5–7–6	21:21	Did not enter
2005–06 C	10th	2–5–11	18:30	Did not enter
2006–07 A	3rd	7–9–2	25:14	Semifinalist
2006–07 C	5th	6–5–7	21:19	Did not enter
2007–08 A	7th	5–6–7	19:22	Did not enter
2007–08 C	5th	7–5–6	24:25	Did not enter
2008–09 A	6th	7–4–7	31:28	Did not enter
2008–09 C	10th	3–2–12	18:37	Did not enter
2009–10 A	9th	4–3–11	17:28	Did not enter
2009–10 C	5th	8–3–7	22:22	Did not enter
2010–11 A	10th	3–4–11	17:31	Did not enter
2010–11 C	7th	5–9–4	16:18	Did not enter
Totals		62–62–91	248:296	

== All-time record vs. opponents ==
- As of 2009–10 Apertura

Opponent	P	W	D	L	F	A	+/-
Atlético Olanchano	8	3	3	2	10	7	+3
Deportes Savio	10	5	1	4	12	9	+3
Marathón	18	2	6	10	19	36	-17
Motagua	20	6	5	9	21	30	-9
Olimpia	18	1	8	9	9	25	-16
Platense	17	3	5	9	19	26	-7
Real España	18	4	4	10	18	26	-8
Real Juventud	6	3	0	3	13	12	+1
Universidad / Broncos UNAH	8	4	2	2	14	6	+8
Valencia	4	1	1	2	4	5	-1
Victoria	18	9	4	5	29	26	+3
Vida	18	6	7	5	26	23	+3

== List of coaches ==
Hispano

- (Honduras) Mauro Reyes
- (Honduras) Edwin Pavón (2006–2007)
- (Honduras) Raúl Martínez Sambulá (2010–2011)

== All Time Scorers ==
As of April 2014

- (Argentina) Sergio Diduch (30) goals
- (Honduras) Leonardo Isaula (13 goals
- (Honduras) Henrri Jimenez (13) goals
- (Uruguay) Oscar Torlacoff (12) goals
- (Honduras) Milton Ruiz (12) goals
- (Honduras) Hector Flores (11) goals
- (Honduras) Rigoberto Padilla (11)goals
- (Honduras) Ney Costa (10)goals
