= CD Choloma =

Club Deportivo Choloma
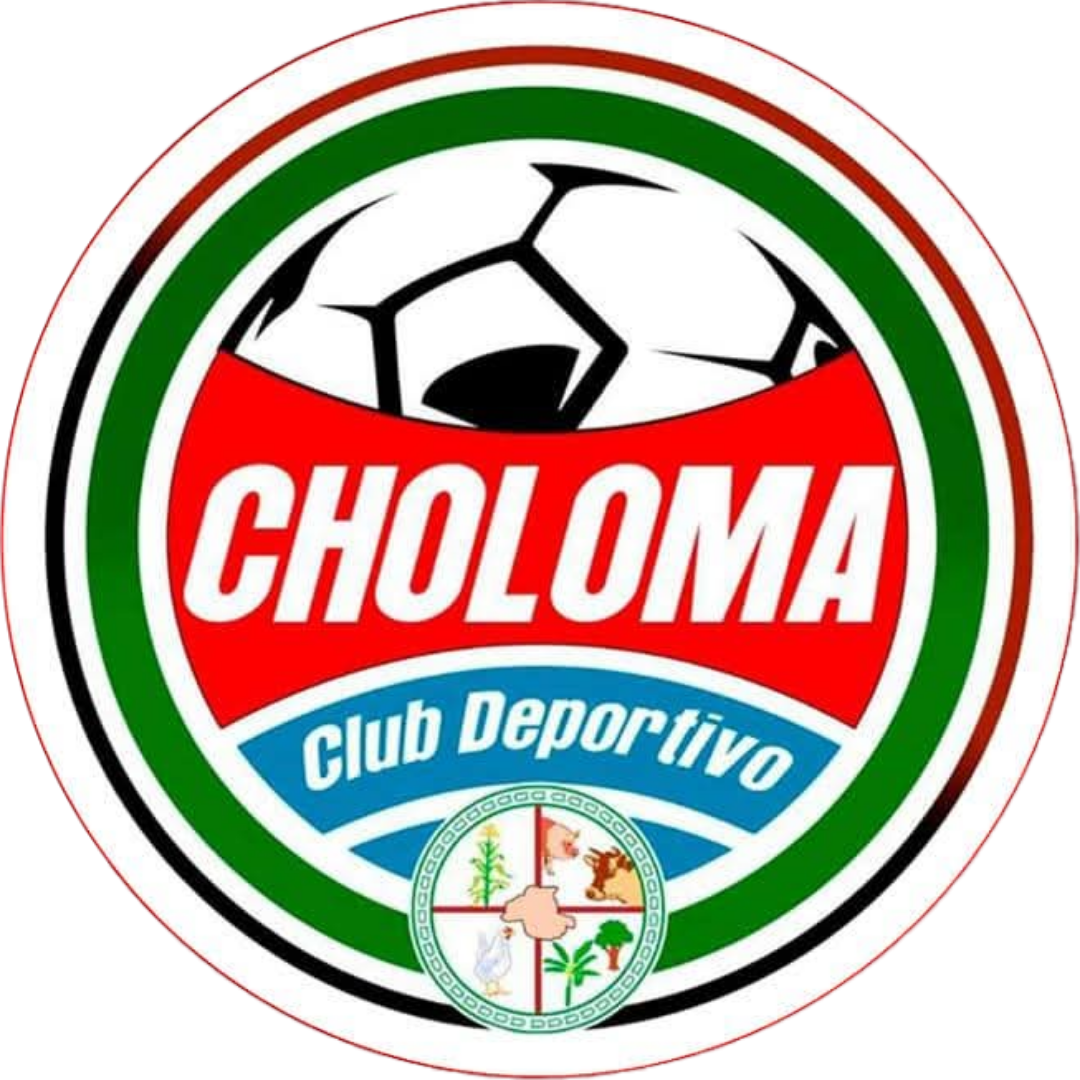
- Full name: Club Deportivo Choloma
- Nicknames: Los Maquileros; Los Toros Bravos (The Brave Bulls)
- Founded: 1 September 1999; 27 years ago
- Ground: Estadio Rubén Deras
- Capacity: 5,500
- Chairman: Javier Hernandez
- Manager: Edwin Roberto Pavón León
- League: Liga Nacional de Fútbol Profesional de Honduras
- 2012–13 C: 10th
Home colours	Away colours

Club Deportivo Choloma is a Honduran football club that plays its home games at Estadio Rubén Deras in Choloma, Cortés.

== History ==
=== Atlético Infop ===
Known as Atlético Infop until 2008, the club was renamed Atlético Choloma in 2008.

Founded only in 2008, Atlético Choloma defeated Parrillas One in the 2010–11 promotion on 18 June 2011, which earned them a spot in the 2011–12 Liga Nacional.

In April 2013, they were relegated under Edwin Pavón which made Pavón the Honduran coach with most relegations in Honduran football history.

== Achievements ==
- Liga de Ascenso

Winners (1): 2010–11 C
Runners-up (2): 2009–10 A, 2013–14 A

== League performance ==
Regular season										Post season								
Season	Pos	Pld	W	D	L	F	A	GD	Pts	Pos	Pld	W	D	L	F	A	GD	Pts
2011–12 A	10th	18	3	9	6	18	27	−9	18	Didn't enter								
2011–12 C	4th	18	8	5	5	20	18	+2	29	6th	2	0	0	2	1	3	−2	0
2012–13 A	5th	18	5	7	6	29	28	+1	22	3rd	4	1	2	1	3	4	–1	5
2012–13 C	10th	18	2	10	6	24	28	−4	16	Didn't enter								

=== All Time Top Scorers ===
(Uruguay) Oscar Torlacoff (29)
