= C.D. Victoria =

Association football club in Honduras

Atracciones Espina
- Full name: Atracciones Espina S.A
- Nicknames: Jaibas Bravas (Fierce Blue Crabs); Lecheros (Milkers)
- Founded: 15 November 1935; 90 years ago
- Ground: Estadio Ceibeño; La Ceiba, Honduras
- Capacity: 18,000
- Owner: Rodrigo Herrera Vazquez
- Chairman: Carlos Eduardo Espina
- Manager: David Patiño
- League: Liga Nacional de Fútbol Profesional de Honduras
- Website: lnphn.com/victoria
Home colours	Away colours	Third colours

Club Deportivo Victoria is a Honduran football club based in La Ceiba, Atlántida. They have enjoyed success in the past having won the Honduran first division once. They currently play in the Honduran first division.

== History ==
Club Deportivo Victoria was founded on 15 November 1935 in La Ceiba. The club started out as the Instituto Manuel Bonilla which later was renamed Club Deportivo Victoria. The club was founded by Jose Felix Sosa Sosa, native of La Ceiba. Throughout his lifetime he received several accolades, and awards for being the rightful founder as in later years he was no longer involved in the club. Due to power struggles with friends of the club he decided to retire early.

Later Miguel J. Kawas became president leading Victoria to their league title in the 1994–95 league.

In 1995, the club won their first championship in 47 years by defeating Club Deportivo Olimpia in a two-legged final. The club has also had some international success. In 2006, they managed to beat Deportivo Saprissa of Costa Rica on their way to finish in fourth place in the UNCAF tournament.

== Club rivalries ==
=== Clásico Ceibeño ===
El Clásico Ceibeño (La Ceiba derby) is a football match played between Victoria and Vida, both teams from La Ceiba, Honduras.

For the first season of professional football, a triangular tournament was organized to decide who would represent La Ceiba in the national league. The tournament was held between three clubs from the Liga Dionisio de Herrera, Vida, Victoria and Atlántida. Vida ultimately qualified for the 1965–66 league.

== Achievements ==
- Liga Nacional
  - Winners (1): 1994–95
  - Runners-up (2): 2005–06 C, 2012–13 A
- Honduran Cup
  - Runners-up (2): 1992, 1996
- Segunda División
  - Winners (3): 1967–68, 1976, 2020–21 C
  - Runners-up (1): 1971–72
- Amateur League
  - Winners (1): 1947
- Atlántida Championship
  - Winners (3): 1947, 1949, 1963
- Copa Interclubes UNCAF
  - Fourth place (1): 2006

== All time top scorers ==
As of 8 September 2012

R	Player	GS
1	(Honduras) Rossell "Rochi" Matute	55
2	(Honduras) Luis Mario	40
3	(Honduras) Enrique Reneau	38
4	(Honduras) Héctor "Tanqueta" Flores	35
5	(Honduras) Eduardo Bennett	34
6	(Honduras) Renán Bengoché	33
7	(Argentina) Alejandro Naif	32
8	(Honduras) Reynaldo Mejía	29
9	(Uruguay) Álvaro Izquierdo	27
10	(Honduras) Jorge Bennett	27
11	(Honduras) Luis Ramírez	24
??	(Honduras) Mitchel Brown	16

== International competition ==
- 2006 Copa Interclubes UNCAF: 4 appearances

First Round v. (Panama) San Francisco – 1:0, 3:1
Quarter-finals v. (Costa Rica) Deportivo Saprissa – 0:1, 2:0
Semi-finals v. (Honduras) Olimpia – 2:2, 0:2
3rd place v. (Guatemala) Marquense – 0:3, 1:1

- 1996 CONCACAF Champions' Cup: 3 appearances

First Round v. (Belize) Corozal Victory FC – 1:3, 2:4
Second Round v. (Panama) Árabe Unido – 1:0, 2:2
Third Round v. (Mexico) Cruz Azul – 1:0, 0:2

== League performance ==
Regular season											Postseason								
Season	P	Pld	W	D	L	F	A	GD	Pts	Ded	P	Pld	W	D	L	F	A	GD	Pts
1968–69	7th	27	8	5	14	33	44	−11	21	—	No postseason								
1969–70	8th	27	7	6	14	34	51	−17	20	—	No postseason								
1970–71	10th	27	3	8	16	28	54	−26	14	—	No postseason								
1977–78	8th	27	5	12	10	17	25	−8	22	—	Did not enter								
1978–79	9th	27	5	14	8	20	29	−9	24	—	Did not enter								
1979–80	4th	27	10	7	10	34	30	+4	27	—	3rd	8	3	2	3	10	10	0	8
1980–81	5th	27	10	8	9	27	33	−6	28	—	5th	8	0	2	6	3	14	−11	2
1981–82	8th	30	8	10	12	33	43	−10	26	—	Did not enter								
1982–83	5th	27	7	15	5	21	15	+6	29	—	4th	8	2	3	3	6	12	−6	7
1983–84	7th	36	12	10	14	31	40	−9	34	—	No postseason								
1984–85	3rd	36	14	12	10	44	33	+11	40	—	3rd	6	1	2	3	4	7	−3	4
1985–86	7th	18	5	7	6	11	14	−3	17	—	Did not enter								
1986–87	9th	27	5	11	11	23	30	−7	21	—	Did not enter								
1987–88	4th	27	10	12	5	26	23	+3	32	—	5th	8	1	3	4	4	12	−8	5
1988–89	6th	27	7	12	8	21	21	0	26	—	Did not enter								
1989–90	6th	27	6	12	9	17	18	−1	24	—	Did not enter								
1990–91	6th	27	6	10	11	18	25	−7	22	—	Did not enter								
1991–92	6th	27	9	8	10	29	28	+1	26	—	Did not enter								
1992–93	7th	27	9	10	8	36	37	−1	28	—	Did not enter								
1993–94	3rd	27	7	14	6	31	25	+6	28	—	4th	2	0	1	1	1	2	−1	1
1994–95	5th	27	9	10	8	29	29	0	37	—	Champion	8	5	2	1	14	8	+6	17
1995–96	2nd	27	12	10	5	38	27	+11	46	—	3rd	6	3	1	2	7	5	+2	10
1996–97	2nd	27	13	8	6	35	24	+11	47	—	3rd	6	3	1	2	7	8	–1	10
1997–98 A	7th	20	5	9	6	25	28	−3	24	—	Did not enter								
1997–98 C	6th	20	6	8	6	24	25	−1	26	—	3rd	4	2	0	2	4	4	0	6
1998–99	5th	18	6	7	5	25	22	+3	25	—	4th	4	1	1	2	3	4	−1	4
1999–00 A	3rd	18	8	7	3	25	19	+6	31	—	3rd	4	2	0	2	4	5	−1	6
1999–00 C	4th	18	6	6	6	25	21	+4	24	—	6th	2	0	0	2	2	4	−2	0
2000–01 A	7th	18	5	6	7	25	24	+1	21	—	Did not enter								
2000–01 C	6th	18	4	8	6	24	28	−4	20	—	5th	2	0	1	1	2	3	−1	1
2001–02 A	6th	18	5	9	4	28	26	+2	24	—	Did not enter								
2001–02 C	4th	18	6	7	5	19	21	−2	25	—	3rd	2	0	1	1	2	3	–1	1
2002–03 A	10th	18	2	6	10	15	26	−11	11	−1	Did not enter								
2002–03 C	8th	18	3	8	7	18	27	−9	17	—	Did not enter								
2003–04 A	8th	18	3	7	8	19	29	−10	16	—	Did not enter								
2003–04 C	2nd	16	9	2	5	26	20	+6	29	—	4th	2	0	0	2	2	4	−2	0
2004–05 A	4th	18	8	7	3	32	26	+6	31	—	4th	2	0	0	2	3	11	−8	0
2004–05 C	8th	18	5	6	7	19	24	−5	21	—	Did not enter								
2005–06 A	2nd	18	9	3	6	30	27	+3	30	—	4th	2	0	0	2	1	5	−4	0
2005–06 C	2nd	18	8	7	3	31	18	+13	31	—	2nd	4	1	2	1	7	5	+2	5
2006–07 A	8th	18	5	4	9	21	28	−7	19	—	Did not enter								
2006–07 C	9th	17	3	5	9	14	22	−8	14	—	Did not enter								
2007–08 A	3rd	18	7	10	1	22	12	+10	31	—	4th	2	0	1	1	1	3	−1	1
2007–08 C	6th	18	6	6	6	17	17	0	24	—	Did not enter								
2008–09 A	8th	18	6	4	8	22	27	−5	22	—	Did not enter								
2008–09 C	5th	18	6	7	5	24	21	+3	25	—	Did not enter								
2009–10 A	5th	18	7	5	6	22	27	−5	26	—	Did not enter								
2009–10 C	10th	18	2	5	11	15	37	−22	11	—	Did not enter								
2010–11 A	1st	18	10	2	6	26	24	+2	32	—	4th	2	0	0	2	0	3	−3	0
2010–11 C	10th	18	3	5	10	25	35	−10	14	—	Did not enter								
2011–12 A	9th	18	5	4	9	21	25	−4	19	—	Did not enter								
2011–12 C	7th	18	7	1	10	28	28	0	22	—	Did not enter								
2012–13 A	2nd	18	10	2	6	26	24	+2	32	—	2nd	4	0	3	1	2	6	-4	3
2012–13 C	3rd	18	6	7	5	24	25	–1	25	—	4th	4	1	1	2	5	7	−2	4
2013–14 A	7th	18	7	3	8	25	26	−1	24	—	Did not enter								
2013–14 C	6th	18	5	8	5	17	20	−3	23	—	4th	4	2	0	2	4	4	0	6
2014–15 A	10th	18	3	7	8	22	34	−12	16	—	Did not enter								
2014–15 C	4th	18	6	7	5	26	22	+4	25	—	3rd	4	3	0	1	3	3	0	9
2015–16 A	9th	18	4	7	7	20	35	−15	19	—	Did not enter								
2015–16 C	10th	18	1	4	13	10	47	−37	7	—	Did not enter								

== Current squad ==
As of 12 April 2026

Note: Flags indicate national team as defined under FIFA eligibility rules; some limited exceptions apply. Players may hold more than one non-FIFA nationality.

No.	Pos.	Nation	Player
1	GK	HON	Esaú Flores
2	DF	ARG	Matías Martínez (captain)
3	DF	HON	Óscar Barrios
4	DF	HON	Elvin Oliva
5	MF	HON	Allan Banegas
6	MF	HON	Carlos Matute
7	DF	HON	Óscar Suazo
8	MF	HON	Kolton Kelly
9	FW	COL	Segundo Granja
10	MF	MEX	Luis Franco
11	FW	HON	Walter Martínez
12	GK	HON	Michael Perelló
16	MF	HON	Avner Portillo
17	FW	BLZ	Carlos Bernárdez

No.	Pos.	Nation	Player
19	FW	CUB	Yaudel Lahera
20	MF	HON	Marcelo Espinal
21	MF	HON	David Morales
23	FW	HON	Geovanny Bueso
24	MF	HON	José Sánchez
25	MF	HON	Bryan Chávez
26	FW	HON	Edgardo Sanchez
28	DF	HON	Ángel Barrios
32	FW	HON	Dester Monico
33	MF	HON	Juan Garcia
35	MF	HON	César Ardón
38	DF	HON	Luis Hernández
48	MF	HON	Samuel Card
65	FW	HON	Lemuel Sevilla

== List of coaches ==
- (Argentina) Omar Muraco
- (Uruguay) Julio González (1994)
- (Spain) Juan Luis Hernández Fuertes (Aug 1996 – Sept 1996)
- (Brazil) Jorge Tupinambá (1995–1999)
- (Honduras) Raúl Martínez Sambulá (2000)
- (Honduras) Ramón Maradiaga (2004)
- (Honduras) Héctor Castellón (2004–2005)
- (Honduras) Jorge Pineda (2005–2006)
- (Uruguay) Ricardo "Tato" Ortíz (1 Jan 2009 – Feb 2010)
- (Uruguay) Reynaldo Villagra (Feb 2010 – June 2010)
- (Honduras) Jorge Pineda (June 2010 – Jan 2011)
- (Honduras) Nahúm Espinoza (Jan 2011 – May 2011)
- (Spain) Carlos García Cantarero (May 2011 – Jan 2012)
- (Argentina) Héctor Vargas (23 Jan 2012 – 31 Dec 2013)
- (Honduras) Carlos Martínez (Dec 2013 – May 2014)
- (Argentina) Cristian Guaita (May 2014 – Sept 2014)
- (Honduras) Jorge Pineda (Sept 2014–?)
- (Honduras) Wilmer Cruz (May 2019 – November 2019)
- (Honduras) Roberto Carlos Padilla (2020-2021)
- (Honduras) Salomón Nazar (2021-2022)
- (Uruguay) Fernando Araújo (2022)
- (Honduras) Salomón Nazar (2022)
- (Argentina) Héctor Vargas (2023)
- (Honduras) Raúl Martínez Sambulá (2023)
- (Argentina) Hernán Medina (2023–present)

== Affiliated clubs ==
- (Spain) Málaga CF
