= 2001–02 C.D. Marathón season =

Marathón
2001–02 season
- Chairman: Arturo Bendaña
- Manager: José de la Paz Herrera
- Apertura: Runner-up
- Clausura: Champion
- Top goalscorer: League: Enrique Reneau (Apertura, 8); Elvis Scott (Clausura, 7); All: Enrique Reneau (13)
- Highest home attendance: 27,394 vs. Olimpia (26 May 2002)
Home colours	Away colours

The 2001–02 C.D. Marathón season in the Honduran football league was divided into two halves, Apertura and Clausura. Marathón was capable to win one tournament, having achieved the third championship in their history.

== Apertura ==
=== Squad ===
Note: Flags indicate national team as defined under FIFA eligibility rules; some limited exceptions apply. Players may hold more than one non-FIFA nationality.

No.	Pos.	Nation	Player
–	GK	ARG	Fernando Regules
–	GK	HON	Juan Centeno
–	GK	HON	Orlin Vallecillo
–	DF	HON	Mauricio Sabillón
–	DF	HON	Jaime Rosales
–	DF	HON	Darwin Pacheco
–	DF	HON	Camilo Bonilla
–	DF	HON	Douglas Murillo
–	DF	HON	Behiker Bustillo
–	DF	HON	Nigel Zúniga
–	DF	HON	Lenín Suárez
–	MF	HON	Dennis Ferrera
–	MF	HON	Luis Guifarro
–	MF	HON	Mario Berríos

No.	Pos.	Nation	Player
–	MF	HON	Mario López
–	MF	HON	Carlos Oliva
–	MF	HON	Emil Martínez
–	MF	ARG	Juan Moles
–	FW	HON	Jimmy González
–	FW	HON	Pompilio Cacho
–	FW	HON	Enrique Reneau
–	FW	BRA	Ricardo Correia

=== Standings ===
Pos	Team	Pld	W	D	L	GF	GA	GD	Pts	Qualification or relegation
1	Motagua	18	8	8	2	22	13	+9	32	Qualified to the Final round
2	Marathón	18	8	7	3	28	22	+6	31	Qualified to the Final round
3	Platense	18	7	6	5	16	14	+2	27	Qualified to the Final round
4	Olimpia	18	6	7	5	25	18	+7	25	Qualified to the Final round
5	Real España	18	5	9	4	21	15	+6	24	

Updated to match(es) played on 2 December 2001. Source:

=== Matches ===
==== Results by round ====
Round	1	2	3	4	5	6	7	8	9	10	11	12	13	14	15	16	17	18
Ground	H	A	H	H	A	A	H	A	A	A	H	A	A	H	H	A	H	H
Result	D	W	D	W	D	L	D	W	W	W	D	W	W	W	D	D	L	L

A = Away; H = Home; W = Win; D = Draw; L = Loss

==== Regular season ====
8 September 2001 Round 1	Marathón	1 – 1	Vida	San Pedro Sula, Cortés

16 September 2001 Round 2	Deportes Savio	0 – 3	Marathón	Santa Rosa de Copán, Copán
			Oliva; Reneau; Martínez	Stadium: Estadio Sergio Reyes

19 September 2001 Round 3	Marathón	1 – 1	Platense	San Pedro Sula, Cortés

22 September 2001 Round 4	Marathón	6 – 3	Victoria	San Pedro Sula, Cortés
	Oliva; Zúniga; Fernández; Reneau; Cacho		Mariano; Oseguera; Pineda

30 September 2001 Round 5	Comayagua	2 – 2	Marathón	Comayagua, Comayagua
19:30 (UTC−06)

4 October 2001 Round 6	Motagua	2 – 1	Marathón	Tegucigalpa, Francisco Morazán
				Stadium: Estadio Tiburcio Carías Andino

10 October 2001 Round 7	Marathón	3 – 3	Universidad	San Pedro Sula, Cortés

14 October 2001 Round 8	Olimpia	0 – 1	Marathón	Tegucigalpa, Francisco Morazán
16:00 (UTC−06)			Cacho	Stadium: Estadio Tiburcio Carías Andino

17 October 2001 Round 9	Real España	0 – 1	Marathón	San Pedro Sula, Cortés
				Stadium: Estadio Francisco Morazán

20 October 2001 Round 10	Vida	0 – 1	Marathón	La Ceiba, Atlántida
15:00 (UTC−06)				Stadium: Estadio Nilmo Edwards

27 October 2001 Round 11	Marathón	3 – 3	Deportes Savio	San Pedro Sula, Cortés
				Stadium: [

31 October 2001 Round 12	Platense	0 – 1	Marathón	Puerto Cortés, Cortés
				Stadium: Estadio Excélsior

3 November 2001 Round 13	Victoria	0 – 2	Marathón	La Ceiba, Atlántida
				Stadium: Estadio Nilmo Edwards

7 November 2001 Round 14	Marathón	1 – 0	Real Comayagua	San Pedro Sula, Cortés

10 November 2001 Round 15	Marathón	0 – 0	Motagua	San Pedro Sula, Cortés

18 November 2001 Round 16	Universidad	0 – 0	Marathón	Tegucigalpa, Francisco Morazán
				Stadium: Estadio Tiburcio Carías Andino

22 November 2001 Round 17	Marathón	1 – 2	Olimpia	San Pedro Sula, Cortés

2 December 2001 Round 18	Marathón	0 – 5	Real España	San Pedro Sula, Cortés

==== Semifinals ====
5 December 2001 1st leg	Platense	1 – 2	Marathón	Puerto Cortés, Cortés
19:30 (UTC−06)	Fernández 23'		Correia 5'; González 79'	Stadium: Estadio Excélsior

8 December 2001 2nd leg	C.D. Marathón	1 – 1	Platense	San Pedro Sula, Cortés
19:30 (UTC−06)	Cacho 58'		Fernández 38'	Stadium: Estadio Francisco Morazán

- Marathón won 3-2 on aggregate.

==== Final ====
12 December 2001 1st leg	Marathón	1 – 0	Motagua	San Pedro Sula, Cortés
19:30 (UTC−06)	Rosales 69' (pen.)			Stadium: Estadio Francisco Morazán

16 December 2001 2nd leg	Motagua	3 – 2 (5 – 3 p)	Marathón	Tegucigalpa, Francisco Morazán
16:00 (UTC−06)	Pacini 22'; Izaguirre 44' (pen.) 56' (pen.)		Rosales 18' (pen.); Oliva 81'	Stadium: Estadio Tiburcio Carías Andino; Referee: Óscar Bardales
	Penalties
	Leyes (penalty scored); Medina (penalty scored); Pacini (penalty scored); Turcios (penalty scored); Izaguirre (penalty scored)		(penalty missed) Cacho; (penalty scored) Zúniga; (penalty scored) Oliva; (penalty scored) Martínez

- Motagua 3-3 Marathón on aggregate; Motagua won 5–3 on penalty shootouts.

== Clausura ==
=== Squad ===
Note: Flags indicate national team as defined under FIFA eligibility rules; some limited exceptions apply. Players may hold more than one non-FIFA nationality.

No.	Pos.	Nation	Player
1	GK	HON	Víctor Coello
21	GK	HON	Juan Centeno
–	GK	ARG	Fernando Regules
–	DF	HON	Walter López
23	DF	HON	Mauricio Sabillón
8	DF	HON	Jaime Rosales
5	DF	HON	Darwin Pacheco
–	DF	HON	Douglas Murillo
–	DF	HON	Leonardo Morales
4	DF	HON	Lenín Suárez
6	DF	HON	Nigel Zúniga
3	MF	HON	Behiker Bustillo

No.	Pos.	Nation	Player
19	MF	HON	Mario Berríos
13	MF	HON	Dennis Ferrera
24	MF	HON	Luis Guifarro
–	MF	ARG	Ariel Leyes
20	MF	HON	Carlos Oliva
11	MF	HON	Mario López
7	MF	HON	Emil Martínez
17	FW	HON	Pompilio Cacho
10	FW	HON	Enrique Reneau
9	FW	HON	Elvis Scott
–	FW	HON	Óscar Vargas
-	FW	HON	Jimmy González

=== Standings ===
Pos	Team	Pld	W	D	L	GF	GA	GD	Pts	Qualification or relegation
1	Olimpia	18	9	6	3	31	16	+15	33	Qualified to the Final round
2	Platense	18	9	4	5	35	25	+10	31	Qualified to the Final round
3	Marathón	18	8	5	5	27	21	+6	29	Qualified to the Final round
4	Victoria	18	6	7	5	19	21	−2	25	Qualified to the Final round
5	Real España	18	5	8	5	16	15	+1	23	

Updated to match(es) played on 12 May 2002. Source:

=== Matches ===
==== Results by round ====
Round	1	2	3	4	5	6	7	8	9	10	11	12	13	14	15	16	17	18
Ground	A	H	A	H	H	H	A	H	H	H	A	H	A	A	A	H	A	A
Result	D	W	W	D	L	W	W	D	D	W	L	W	W	L	L	D	W	L

A = Away; H = Home; W = Win; D = Draw; L = Loss

==== Regular season ====
20 January 2002 Round 1	Motagua	1 – 1	Marathón	Danlí, Honduras
	Bernárdez 76'		Scott 23'	Attendance: 5,127; Referee: Henry Ramírez

26 January 2002 Round 2	Marathón	4 – 1	Universidad	San Pedro Sula, Cortés
16:00 (UTC−06)	Martínez 20'; Cacho 31'; Scott 52'; González 87'		Peralta 70'	Stadium: Estadio Olímpico Metropolitano; Attendance: 2,004; Referee: Lucinio Rodríguez

3 February 2002 Round 3	Real Comayagua	0 – 1	Marathón	Comayagua, Comayagua
			Martínez 51'

9 February 2002 Round 4	Marathón	3 – 3	Victoria	San Pedro Sula, Cortés
	Scott 6'; Cacho 8' 85'		López 18'; Figueroa 75'; Martínez 90'	Stadium: Estadio Olímpico Metropolitano; Attendance: 2,243

17 February 2002 Round 5	Marathón	0 – 2	Olimpia	San Pedro Sula, Cortés
16:00 (UTC−06)			Velásquez 8' 84'	Stadium: Estadio Francisco Morazán; Attendance: 8,342; Referee: Óscar Bardales

24 February 2002 Round 6	Marathón	2 – 1	Real España	San Pedro Sula, Cortés
19:30 (UTC−06)	Scott 38'; Mendoza o.g.' (90)		Sambulá 62'	Stadium: Estadio Francisco Morazán

2 March 2002 Round 7	Vida	0 – 1	Marathón	La Ceiba, Atlántida
			Scott 50'	Stadium: Estadio Nilmo Edwards

9 March 2002 Round 8	Marathón	0 – 0	Deportes Savio	San Pedro Sula, Cortés
				Stadium: Estadio Olímpico Metropolitano; Referee: Nelson Hernández

16 February 2002 Round 9	Marathón	1 – 1	Platense	San Pedro Sula, Cortés
19:30 (UTC−06)	Rosales 74'		Ferreira 56'	Stadium: Estadio Francisco Morazán; Attendance: 2,636; Referee: Benigno Pineda

23 March 2002 Round 10	Marathón	1 – 0	Motagua	San Pedro Sula, Cortés
	Oliva 50'			Stadium: Estadio Francisco Morazán; Attendance: 4,000; Referee: Marcio Carranza

7 April 2002 Round 11	Universidad	2 – 1	Marathón	Choluteca, Choluteca
15:00 (UTC−06)	Lavaca 15'; Phillips 48'		Martínez 68'	Stadium: Estadio Fausto Flores Lagos; Attendance: 1,518; Referee: Francisco Zelaya

13 April 2002 Round 12	Marathón	3 – 1	Real Comayagua	San Pedro Sula, Cortés
19:30 (UTC−06)	Rosales 25'; Scott 60'; Leyes 69'		A. Martínez 78'	Stadium: Estadio Olímpico Metropolitano; Referee: Juan Cruz Perdomo

17 April 2002 Round 13	Victoria	0 – 2	Marathón	La Ceiba, Atlántida
16:00 (UTC−06)			Rosales 11'; Martínez 90+2'	Stadium: Estadio Nilmo Edwards; Attendance: 3,093; Referee: José Sandoval

21 April 2002 Round 14	Olimpia	3 – 1	Marathón	Tegucigalpa, Francisco Morazán
16:00 (UTC−06)	Ulloa 7'; Velásquez 72' 86'		Cacho 79'	Stadium: Estadio Tiburcio Carías Andino; Attendance: 8,686; Referee: Argelio Sabillón

24 April 2002 Round 15	Real España	2 – 1	Marathón	San Pedro Sula, Cortés
	Santamaría 37'; Mejía 80'		Oliva 3'	Stadium: Estadio Francisco Morazán; Attendance: 2,062

27 April 2002 Round 16	Marathón	2 – 2	Vida	San Pedro Sula, Cortés
18:00 (UTC−06)	Oliva 21'; W. López 80'		López 19'; C. Güity 35'	Stadium: Estadio Olímpico Metropolitano

5 May 2002 Round 17	Deportes Savio	0 – 2	Marathón	Santa Rosa de Copán, Copán
			Reneau 35'; Scott 90+1'	Stadium: Estadio Sergio Reyes; Attendance: 1,929

9 May 2002 Round 18	Platense	2 – 1	Marathón	Puerto Cortés, Cortés
19:30 (UTC−06)	Hulse 78'; Ferreira 85'		Scott 89'	Stadium: Estadio Excélsior; Attendance: 2,147

==== Semifinals ====
16 May 2002 1st round	Marathón	2 – 1	Platense	San Pedro Sula, Cortés
19:30 (UTC−06)	Reneau 30' 45'		Laing 82'	Stadium: Estadio Olímpico Metropolitano

19 May 2002 2nd leg	Platense	0 – 0	Marathón	Puerto Cortés, Cortés
15:00 (UTC−06)				Stadium: Estadio Tiburcio Carías Andino

- Marathón won 2–1 on aggregate.

==== Final ====
23 May 2002 1st leg	Marathón	4 – 1	Olimpia	San Pedro Sula, Cortés
19:30 (UTC−06)	Zúniga 44' (pen.); Reneau 49' 52'; Vargas 85'		Tosello 60'	Stadium: Estadio Olímpico Metropolitano; Attendance: 29,000; Referee: Óscar Bardales

26 May 2002 2nd leg	Olimpia	1 – 0	Marathón	Tegucigalpa, Francisco Morazán
16:00 (UTC−06)	Fuentes 7'			Stadium: Estadio Tiburcio Carías Andino; Attendance: 15,187; Referee: Argelio Sabillón

- Marathón won 4–1 on aggregate.

== Total scorers ==
Goals	Player
13	(Honduras) Enrique Reneau
11	(Honduras) Pompilio Cacho
8	(Honduras) Carlos Oliva
7	(Honduras) Emil Martínez
7	(Honduras) Elvis Scott*

- Only at Clausura.

== Matches played ==
Matches	Player
41	(Honduras) Jaime Rosales
41	(Honduras) Luis Guifarro
40	(Honduras) Nigel Zúniga
40	(Honduras) Carlos Oliva
39	(Honduras) Lenín Suárez
