= 2002–03 C.D. Marathón season =

Marathón
2002–03 season
- Chairman: Arturo Bendaña
- Manager: José de la Paz Herrera, Gilberto Machado, and Rubén Guifarro (Apertura); Miguel Ángel Lemme and Flavio Ortega (Clausura)
- Apertura: Third place/Semifinals
- Clausura: Champion
- Top goalscorer: League: Pompilio Cacho (Apertura, 5); Pompilio Cacho and Denilson Costa (Clausura, 10); All: Pompilio Cacho (15)
- Highest home attendance: 35,745 vs. Motagua (1 June 2003)
Home colours	Away colours

The 2002–03 C.D. Marathón season in the Honduran football league was divided into two halves, Apertura and Clausura. Marathón was capable to win one tournament, having achieved the fourth championship in their history.

== Apertura ==
=== Squad ===
Note: Flags indicate national team as defined under FIFA eligibility rules; some limited exceptions apply. Players may hold more than one non-FIFA nationality.

No.	Pos.	Nation	Player
–	GK	(Argentina) ARG	Víctor Coello
–	GK	(Honduras) HON	Juan Centeno
–	GK	(Honduras) HON	Orlin Vallecillo
–	DF	(Honduras) HON	Mauricio Sabillón
–	DF	(Honduras) HON	Walter López
–	DF	(Honduras) HON	Darwin Pacheco
–	DF	(Honduras) HON	Luis Santamaría
–	DF	(Honduras) HON	David Cárcamo
–	DF	(Honduras) HON	Behiker Bustillo
–	DF	(Honduras) HON	Leonardo Morales
–	DF	(Paraguay) PAR	Alfredo Jara
–	DF	(Honduras) HON	Lenín Suárez
–	MF	(Honduras) HON	Dennis Ferrera
–	MF	(Honduras) HON	Luis Guifarro
–	MF	(Honduras) HON	Mario Berríos

No.	Pos.	Nation	Player
–	MF	(Honduras) HON	Mario López
–	MF	(Honduras) HON	Rubén Suazo
–	MF	(Honduras) HON	Carlos Salinas
–	MF	(Honduras) HON	Emil Martínez
–	MF	(Honduras) HON	Carlos Güity
–	MF	(Honduras) HON	Narciso Fernández
–	MF	(Honduras) HON	Anael Figueroa
–	FW	(Honduras) HON	Orvin Cabrera
–	FW	(Honduras) HON	Pompilio Cacho
–	FW	(Honduras) HON	Elvis Scott
–	FW	(Brazil) BRA	Jean Carles Rosario
–	FW	(Brazil) BRA	Silvian López
–	FW	(Brazil) BRA	Lisandro Silva
–	FW	(Honduras) HON	Óscar Vargas

=== Standings ===
Pos	Team	Pld	W	D	L	GF	GA	GD	Pts	Qualification or relegation
1	Platense	18	12	5	1	42	14	+28	41	Qualified to the Final round
2	Olimpia	18	7	10	1	25	17	+8	31	Qualified to the Final round
3	Marathón	18	7	7	4	22	16	+6	28	Qualified to the Final round
4	Real España	18	6	8	4	25	18	+7	26	Qualified to the Final round
5	Motagua	18	7	5	6	24	23	+1	26	

Updated to match(es) played on 24 November 2002. Source:

=== Matches ===
==== Results by round ====
Round	1	2	3	4	5	6	7	8	9	10	11	12	13	14	15	16	17	18
Ground	A	H	A	A	H	H	A	A	H	H	A	H	H	A	A	H	H	A
Result	L	D	L	W	D	W	D	D	D	D	W	L	W	L	D	W	W	W

A = Away; H = Home; W = Win; D = Draw; L = Loss

==== Regular season ====
11 August 2002 Round 1	Honduras Salzburg	1 – 0	Marathón	El Progreso, Yoro
				Stadium: Estadio Humberto Micheletti

17 August 2002 Round 2	Marathón	1 – 1	Vida	San Pedro Sula, Cortés Department
				Stadium: Estadio Olímpico Metropolitano

25 August 2002 Round 3	Platense	2 – 0	Marathón	Puerto Cortés, Cortés
	Ferreira			Stadium: Estadio Excélsior

31 August 2002 Round 4	Victoria	1 – 2	Marathón	La Ceiba, Atlántida
			Scott	Stadium: Estadio Nilmo Edwards

4 September 2002 Round 5	Marathón	1 – 1	Olimpia	San Pedro Sula, Cortés Department
19:30 (UTC−06)				Stadium: Estadio Olímpico Metropolitano

7 September 2002 Round 6	Marathón	3 – 0	Universidad	San Pedro Sula, Cortés
	Cacho; Pacheco			Stadium: Estadio Olímpico Metropolitano

14 September 2002 Round 7	Motagua	2 – 2	Marathón	Tegucigalpa, Francisco Morazán
				Stadium: Estadio Tiburcio Carías Andino

22 September 2002 Round 8	Real Maya	1 – 1	Marathón	Comayagua, Comayagua
16:00 (UTC−06)			Cacho

13 October 2002 Round 9	Marathón	0 – 0	Real España	San Pedro Sula, Cortés
				Stadium: Estadio Olímpico Metropolitano

2 October 2002 Round 10	Marathón	1 – 1	Honduras Salzburg	San Pedro Sula, Cortés
19:00 (UTC−06)	Bustillo			Stadium: Estadio Olímpico Metropolitano

7 October 2002 Round 11	Vida	0 – 3	Marathón	La Ceiba, Atlántida
			Cacho; Martínez; Vargas	Stadium: Estadio Nilmo Edwards

12 October 2002 Round 12	Marathón	1 – 3	Platense	San Pedro Sula, Cortés
				Stadium: Estadio Olímpico Metropolitano

19 October 2002 Round 13	Marathón	2 – 0	Victoria	San Pedro Sula, Cortés
	Berríos			Stadium: Estadio Olímpico Metropolitano

23 October 2002 Round 14	Olimpia	2 – 0	Marathón	Tegucigalpa, Francisco Morazán
				Stadium: Estadio Tiburcio Carías Andino

20 November 2002 Round 15	Universidad	1 – 1	Marathón	Tegucigalpa, Francisco Morazán

9 November 2002 Round 16	Marathón	2 – 0	Motagua	San Pedro Sula, Cortés
	Martínez			Stadium: Estadio Olímpico Metropolitano

16 November 2002 Round 17	Marathón	1 – 0	Real Maya	San Pedro Sula, Cortés
	Suárez			Stadium: Estadio Olímpico Metropolitano

24 November 2002 Round 18	Real España	0 – 1	Marathón	San Pedro Sula, Cortés
				Stadium: Estadio Francisco Morazán

==== Semifinals ====
28 November 2002 1st leg	Marathón	0 – 2	Olimpia	San Pedro Sula, Cortés
19:30 (UTC−06)	Bennett; Bonilla			Stadium: Estadio Olímpico Metropolitano

1 December 2002 2nd leg	Olimpia	0 – 1	Marathón	Tegucigalpa, Francisco Morazán
16:00 (UTC−06)			Rosario	Stadium: Estadio Tiburcio Carías Andino

- Olimpia won 3-2 on aggregate.

== Clausura ==
=== Squad ===
Note: Flags indicate national team as defined under FIFA eligibility rules; some limited exceptions apply. Players may hold more than one non-FIFA nationality.

No.	Pos.	Nation	Player
1	GK	(Honduras) HON	Víctor Coello
–	GK	(Honduras) HON	Hugo Caballero
–	GK	(Honduras) HON	Orlin Vallecillo
–	DF	(Honduras) HON	Walter López
23	DF	(Honduras) HON	Mauricio Sabillón
6	DF	(Honduras) HON	José Luis López
5	DF	(Honduras) HON	Darwin Pacheco
–	DF	(Honduras) HON	David Cárcamo
–	DF	(Honduras) HON	Leonardo Morales
4	DF	(Honduras) HON	Lenín Suárez
–	DF	(Honduras) HON	Luis Santamaría
3	DF	(Honduras) HON	Behiker Bustillo
20	MF	(Honduras) HON	Narciso Fernández
19	MF	(Honduras) HON	Mario Berríos

No.	Pos.	Nation	Player
13	MF	(Honduras) HON	Dennis Ferrera
24	MF	(Honduras) HON	Luis Guifarro
–	MF	(Honduras) HON	Rubén Suazo
–	MF	(Honduras) HON	Carlos Güity
–	MF	(Honduras) HON	Carlos Salinas
–	MF	(Honduras) HON	Ilich Arias
7	MF	(Honduras) HON	Emil Martínez
–	FW	(Argentina) ARG	Juan Manuel Zandoná
17	FW	(Honduras) HON	Pompilio Cacho
10	FW	(Brazil) BRA	Denilson Costa
9	FW	(Argentina) ARG	José Pacini
–	FW	(Honduras) HON	Óscar Vargas
–	FW	(Honduras) HON	David Cáceres

=== Standings ===
Pos	Team	Pld	W	D	L	GF	GA	GD	Pts	Qualification or relegation
1	Olimpia	18	10	5	3	32	19	+13	35	Qualified to the Final round
2	Marathón	18	10	3	5	33	17	+16	33	Qualified to the Final round
3	Real España	18	9	6	3	25	15	+10	33	Qualified to the Final round
4	Motagua	18	7	8	3	19	13	+6	29	Qualified to the Final round
5	Vida	18	7	4	7	24	30	−6	25	

Updated to match(es) played on 10 May 2003. Source:

=== Matches ===
==== Results by round ====
Round	1	2	3	4	5	6	7	8	9	10	11	12	13	14	15	16	17	18
Ground	A	H	A	H	H	A	H	A	A	H	A	H	A	A	H	A	H	H
Result	L	W	D	W	W	L	L	D	D	W	L	L	W	W	W	W	W	W

A = Away; H = Home; W = Win; D = Draw; L = Loss

==== Regular season ====
5 January 2003 Round 1	Olimpia	4 – 1	Marathón	Tegucigalpa, Francisco Morazán
	Palacios; Tilguath; Romero; Cárcamo		Palacios o.g.'	Stadium: Estadio Tiburcio Carías Andino

18 January 2003 Round 2	Marathón	1 – 0	Platense	San Pedro Sula, Cortés
16:00 (UTC−06)	Cacho			Stadium: Estadio Olímpico Metropolitano

26 January 2003 Round 3	Real España	1 – 1	Marathón	San Pedro Sula, Cortés
	Emílio		Costa	Stadium: Estadio Francisco Morazán

1 February 2003 Round 4	Marathón	4 – 2	Vida	San Pedro Sula, Cortés
	Costa; Cacho; Vargas; Mauricio Sabillón		Ramírez; S. Arzú	Stadium: Estadio Olímpico Metropolitano

8 February 2003 Round 5	Marathón	1 – 0	Real Maya	San Pedro Sula, Cortés
16:00 (UTC−06)				Stadium: Estadio Olímpico Metropolitano

16 February 2003 Round 6	Honduras Salzburg	1 – 0	Marathón	El Progreso, Yoro
19:30 (UTC−06)				Stadium: Estadio Humberto Micheletti

22 February 2003 Round 7	Marathón	2 – 3	Motagua	San Pedro Sula, Cortés
				Stadium: Estadio Olímpico Metropolitano

1 March 2003 Round 8	Victoria	0 – 0	Marathón	La Ceiba, Atlántida
				Stadium: Estadio Nilmo Edwards

9 March 2003 Round 9	Universidad	1 – 1	Marathón	Tegucigalpa, Francisco Morazán
16:30 (UTC−06)				Stadium: Estadio Tiburcio Carías Andino

15 March 2003 Round 10	Marathón	1 – 0	Olimpia	San Pedro Sula, Cortés
				Stadium: Estadio Olímpico Metropolitano

23 March 2003 Round 11	Platense	3 – 2	Marathón	Puerto Cortés, Cortés
15:00 (UTC−06)	Hulse; Álvarez; Argueta		Pacini; Costa	Stadium: Estadio Excélsior

29 March 2003 Round 12	Marathón	0 – 1	Real España	San Pedro Sula, Cortés
19:30 (UTC−06)			Emílio	Stadium: Estadio Olímpico Metropolitano

5 April 2003 Round 13	Vida	0 – 6	Marathón	La Ceiba, Atlántida
19:00 (UTC−06)			Cacho; Salinas; Costa; Santamaría	Stadium: Estadio Nilmo Edwards

9 April 2003 Round 14	Marathón	2 – 0	Honduras Salzburg	San Pedro Sula, Cortés
16:00 (UTC−06)	Costa; Cacho (pen.)			Stadium: Estadio Olímpico Metropolitano

13 April 2003 Round 15	Real Maya	0 – 4	Marathón	Santa Bárbara, Santa Bárbara
			Cacho; Martínez; Costa; Pacini

29 April 2003 Round 16	Motagua	0 – 1	Marathón	Tegucigalpa, Atlántida
16:00 (UTC−06)			Pacheco	Stadium: Estadio Tiburcio Carías Andino

3 May 2003 Round 17	Marathón	2 – 0	Victoria	San Pedro Sula, Cortés
				Stadium: Estadio Olímpico Metropolitano

10 May 2003 Round 18	Marathón	4 – 1	Universidad	San Pedro Sula, Cortés
19:30 (UTC−06)	Cacho; Pacini			Stadium: Estadio Olímpico Metropolitano

==== Semifinals ====
14 May 2003 1st round	Real España	1 – 1	Marathón	San Pedro Sula, Cortés
19:30 (UTC−06)	Jiménez		Cacho	Stadium: Estadio Francisco Morazán

17 May 2003 2nd leg	Marathón	1 – 1	Real España	San Pedro Sula, Cortés
15:00 (UTC−06)	Fernández		Betine	Stadium: Estadio Olímpico Metropolitano

- Marathón 1–1 Real España on aggregate score; Marathón advanced on better Regular season performance.

==== Final ====
25 May 2003 1st leg	Motagua	0 – 1	Marathón	Tegucigalpa, Francisco Morazán
16:00 (UTC−06)			Martínez 65'	Stadium: Estadio Tiburcio Carías Andino; Attendance: 21,691; Referee: Óscar Bardales

1 June 2003 2nd leg	Marathón	3 – 1	Motagua	San Pedro Sula, Cortés
16:00 (UTC−06)	Cacho 44'; Costa 60' 89'		Oseguera 40'	Stadium: Estadio Olímpico Metropolitano; Attendance: 35,745; Referee: Marcio Carranza

- Marathón won 4–1 on aggregate.

== Total scorers ==
Goals	Player
15	(Honduras) Pompilio Cacho
10	(Brazil) Denilson Costa*
8	(Honduras) Emil Martínez
7	(Argentina) José Pacini
6	(Honduras) Elvis Scott**

- Only at Clausura
  - Only at Apertura
