= 2004–05 C.D. Marathón season =

Marathón
2004–05 season
- Chairman: Arturo Bendaña and Yankel Rosenthal
- Manager: Alfonso Rendón and Nicolás Suazo
- Apertura: Champion
- Clausura: Runner-up
- Top goalscorer: League: Edgardo Simovic (Apertura, 8 goals); Edgardo Simovic (Clausura, 8 goals); All: Edgardo Simovic (16 goals)
Home colours	Away colours

The 2004–05 C.D. Marathón season in the Honduran football league was divided into two halves, Apertura and Clausura. Marathón was capable to win one tournament, having achieved the fifth championship in their history.

== Apertura ==
=== Squad ===
Note: Flags indicate national team as defined under FIFA eligibility rules; some limited exceptions apply. Players may hold more than one non-FIFA nationality.

No.	Pos.	Nation	Player
–	GK	(Honduras) HON	Víctor Coello
–	GK	(Panama) PAN	Donaldo González
–	GK	(Honduras) HON	Orlin Vallecillo
–	DF	(Honduras) HON	Mauricio Sabillón
–	DF	(Honduras) HON	Edwin Salvador
–	DF	(Honduras) HON	Darwin Pacheco
–	DF	(Honduras) HON	Luis Santamaría
–	DF	(Panama) PAN	Anthony Torres
–	DF	(Honduras) HON	Behiker Bustillo
–	DF	(Honduras) HON	José Luis López
–	DF	(Honduras) HON	Erick Fuentes
–	DF	(Honduras) HON	Héctor Rosales
–	DF	(Honduras) HON	Irving Guerrero
–	MF	(Honduras) HON	Dennis Ferrera
–	MF	(Honduras) HON	Luis Guifarro

No.	Pos.	Nation	Player
–	MF	(Honduras) HON	Mario Berríos
–	MF	(Honduras) HON	Ilich Arias
–	MF	(Argentina) ARG	Pablo Genovese
–	MF	(Honduras) HON	Roberto Carlos López
–	MF	(Honduras) HON	Emil Martínez
–	MF	(Argentina) ARG	Juan Yalet
–	MF	(Honduras) HON	Narciso Fernández
–	MF	(Honduras) HON	Luis Ramos
–	MF	(Honduras) HON	Walter Martínez
–	FW	(Honduras) HON	Milton Núñez
–	FW	(Uruguay) URU	Edgardo Simovic
–	FW	(Brazil) BRA	Denilson Costa
–	FW	(Honduras) HON	Óscar Vargas
–	FW	(Honduras) HON	José Güity
–	FW	(Honduras) HON	David Cáceres

=== Standings ===
Pos	Team	Pld	W	D	L	GF	GA	GD	Pts	Qualification or relegation
1	Olimpia	18	12	3	3	39	17	+22	39	Qualification to the Final round
2	Marathón	18	10	4	4	23	17	+6	34	Qualification to the Final round
3	Real España	18	9	4	5	23	12	+11	31	Qualification to the Final round
4	Victoria	18	8	7	3	32	26	+6	31	Qualification to the Final round
5	Vida	18	6	4	8	20	23	−3	22	

Updated to match(es) played on 14 November 2004. Source:

=== Matches ===
==== Results by round ====
Round	1	2	3	4	5	6	7	8	9	10	11	12	13	14	15	16	17	18
Ground	A	H	A	H	A	A	A	H	H	H	A	H	A	H	H	H	A	A
Result	W	W	L	D	W	L	W	W	L	W	L	W	D	W	W	W	D	D

A = Away; H = Home; W = Win; D = Draw; L = Loss

==== Regular season ====
7 August 2004 Round 1	Vida	0 – 2	Marathón	La Ceiba, Atlántida
			Berríos 11'; Güity 70'	Stadium: Estadio Nilmo Edwards

13 August 2004 Round 2	Marathón	2 – 0	Valencia	San Pedro Sula, Cortés Department
	W. Martínez 61'; Berríos 62'			Stadium: Estadio Olímpico Metropolitano

21 August 2004 Round 3	Olimpia	3 – 0	Marathón	Tegucigalpa, Cortés
	Velásquez 8' 34'; Emílio 46'			Stadium: Estadio Tiburcio Carías Andino

25 August 2004 Round 4	Marathón	0 – 0	Motagua	San Pedro Sula, Cortés
				Stadium: Estadio Olímpico Metropolitano

28 August 2004 Round 5	Victoria	2 – 3	Marathón	La Ceiba, Atlántida
19:30 (UTC−06)	Bennett 9' (pen.); Ramírez 50'		Berríos 14'; Güity 62'; Simovic 74'	Stadium: Estadio Nilmo Edwards

3 September 2004 Round 6	Marathón	0 – 2	Real España	San Pedro Sula, Cortés
	W. Hernández 56'; S. Arzú 90'			Stadium: Estadio Olímpico Metropolitano

12 September 2004 Round 7	Platense	1 – 2	Marathón	Puerto Cortés, Cortés
	F. Ramírez 2'		Genovese 28'; Martínez 41'	Stadium: Estadio Excélsior

15 September 2004 Round 8	Marathón	3 – 1	Atlético Olanchano	San Pedro Sula, Cortés
16:00 (UTC−06)	Martínez 9'; Simovic 50'; Núñez 55'		N. Costa 76'

19 September 2004 Round 9	Marathón	0 – 2	Universidad	San Pedro Sula, Cortés
			Lormera 15'; Pérez 87'	Stadium: Estadio Olímpico Metropolitano

5 September 2004 Round 10	Marathón	1 – 0	Vida	San Pedro Sula, Cortés
19:00 (UTC−06)	Núñez 61'			Stadium: Estadio Olímpico Metropolitano

29 September 2004 Round 11	Valencia	1 – 0	Marathón	Choluteca, Choluteca
	Raudales 34'			Stadium: Estadio Fausto Flores Lagos

3 October 2004 Round 12	Marathón	1 – 0	Olimpia	San Pedro Sula, Cortés
	Costa 63'			Stadium: Estadio Olímpico Metropolitano

4 November 2004 Round 13	Motagua	1 – 1	Marathón	Tegucigalpa, Francisco Morazán
	Hulse 31'		Simovic 77'	Stadium: Estadio Tiburcio Carías Andino

30 October 2004 Round 14	Marathón	2 – 1	Victoria	San Pedro Sula, Cortés
	Sabillón 34'; Costa 46'		Ramírez 69'	Stadium: Estadio Olímpico Metropolitano

22 October 2004 Round 15	Real España	0 – 2	Marathón	San Pedro Sula, Cortés
			Yalet 61'; Santamaría 90'	Stadium: Estadio Olímpico Metropolitano

30 October 2004 Round 16	Marathón	2 – 1	Platense	San Pedro Sula, Cortés
	Pacheco 43'; Yalet 73'		F. Ramírez 18'	Stadium: Estadio Olímpico Metropolitano

7 November 2004 Round 17	Atlético Olanchano	2 – 2	Marathón	Catacamas, Olancho
	Peri 28'; Costa 80'		Simovic 36'; Yépez 84' (o.g.)	Stadium: Estadio Rubén Guifarro

14 November 2004 Round 18	Universidad	0 – 0	Marathón	Comayagua, Comayagua
				Stadium: Estadio Carlos Miranda

==== Semifinals ====
25 November 2004 1st leg	Real España	1 – 2	Marathón	San Pedro Sula, Cortés
19:30 (UTC−06)	Santana 40' (pen.)		Simovic 78'; Berríos 89'	Stadium: Estadio Francisco Morazán

28 November 2004 2nd leg	C.D. Marathón	1 – 1	Real España	San Pedro Sula, Cortés
16:00 (UTC−06)	Núñez 83'		Santana 30'	Stadium: Estadio Olímpico Metropolitano

- Marathón won 3–2 on aggregate.

==== Final ====
===== Olimpia vs Marathón =====
12 December 2004 1st leg	Marathón	3 – 2	Olimpia	San Pedro Sula, Cortés
(UTC−06:00)	Pacheco 18'; Simovic 25'; Núñez 75'		Tosello 24'; Emílio 42'	Stadium: Estadio Olímpico Metropolitano; Attendance: 13,000

19 December 2004 2nd leg	Olimpia	1 – 2 AET	Marathón	Tegucigalpa, Francisco Morazán
16:00 (UTC−06:00)	Cárcamo 67'		Simovic 95' 102'	Stadium: Estadio Tiburcio Carías Andino; Attendance: 18,000; Referee: Marcio Carranza

- Marathón won 5-3 on aggregate score.

== Clausura ==
=== Squad ===
Note: Flags indicate national team as defined under FIFA eligibility rules; some limited exceptions apply. Players may hold more than one non-FIFA nationality.

No.	Pos.	Nation	Player
–	GK	(Honduras) HON	Víctor Coello
–	GK	(Panama) PAN	Donaldo González
–	GK	(Honduras) HON	Orlin Vallecillo
–	DF	(Honduras) HON	Mauricio Sabillón
–	DF	(Honduras) HON	Edwin Salvador
–	DF	(Panama) PAN	Anthony Torres
–	DF	(Honduras) HON	Darwin Pacheco
–	DF	(Honduras) HON	Ángel Hill
–	DF	(Honduras) HON	Erick Fuentes
–	DF	(Honduras) HON	Behiker Bustillo
–	DF	(Honduras) HON	Héctor Rosales
–	DF	(Honduras) HON	Irving Guerrero
–	MF	(Honduras) HON	Narciso Fernández
–	MF	(Honduras) HON	Mario Berríos
–	MF	(Honduras) HON	Luis Guifarro

No.	Pos.	Nation	Player
–	MF	(Honduras) HON	Dennis Ferrera
–	MF	(Honduras) HON	Ilich Arias
–	MF	(Argentina) ARG	Pablo Genovese
–	MF	(Honduras) HON	Luis Ramos
–	MF	(Honduras) HON	Mariano Acevedo
–	MF	(Argentina) ARG	Juan Yalet
–	MF	(Honduras) HON	Emil Martínez
–	MF	(Argentina) ARG	Santiago Autino
–	FW	(Honduras) HON	Milton Núñez
–	FW	(Uruguay) URU	Edgardo Simovic
–	FW	(Brazil) BRA	Denilson Costa
–	FW	(Honduras) HON	Pompilio Cacho
–	FW	(Honduras) HON	Óscar Vargas
–	FW	(Honduras) HON	David Cáceres

=== Standings ===
Pos	Team	Pld	W	D	L	GF	GA	GD	Pts	Qualification or relegation
1	Olimpia	18	11	5	2	29	14	+15	38	Qualified to the Final round (Note: Top 4 qualified to the Final round.)
2	Marathón	18	7	6	5	24	22	+2	27	Qualified to the Final round
3	Universidad	18	6	8	4	7	8	−1	26	Qualified to the Final round
4	Platense	18	6	6	6	24	19	+5	24	Qualified to the Final round
5	Motagua	18	4	11	3	18	18	0	23	

=== Matches ===
==== Results by round ====
Round	1	2	3	4	5	6	7	8	9	10	11	12	13	14	15	16	17	18
Ground	A	H	A	H	A	H	A	H	H	H	A	H	A	H	A	H	A	A
Result	L	D	W	W	D	W	W	W	W	L	W	L	D	D	D	D	L	L

A = Away; H = Home; W = Win; D = Draw; L = Loss

==== Regular season ====
22 January 2005 Round 1	Victoria	3 – 2	Marathón	La Ceiba, Atlántida
	H. Flores		Simovic	Stadium: Estadio Nilmo Edwards

29 January 2005 Round 2	Marathón	0 – 0	Atlético Olanchano	San Pedro Sula, Cortés
16:00 (UTC−06)				Stadium: Estadio Olímpico Metropolitano

2 February 2005 Round 3	Platense	1 – 3	Marathón	Puerto Cortés, Cortés
	F. Ramírez		Núñez 22'; Martínez; Simovic	Stadium: Estadio Excélsior

5 February 2005 Round 4	Marathón	3 – 1	Motagua	San Pedro Sula, Cortés
	Ferrera			Stadium: Estadio Olímpico Metropolitano

12 February 2005 Round 5	Vida	0 – 0	Marathón	La Ceiba, Atlántida
16:00 (UTC−06)				Stadium: Estadio Nilmo Edwards

15 March 2005 Round 6	Marathón	4 – 3	Real España	San Pedro Sula, Cortés
19:30 (UTC−06)	Simovic; Núñez			Stadium: Estadio Francisco Morazán

3 March 2005 Round 7	Olimpia	1 – 2	Marathón	Tegucigalpa, Francisco Morazán
			Yalet 28'; Núñez 72'	Stadium: Estadio Tiburcio Carías Andino

6 March 2005 Round 8	Marathón	2 – 1	Valencia	San Pedro Sula, Cortés
	Simovic			Stadium: Estadio Olímpico Metropolitano

12 March 2005 Round 9	Marathón	1 – 0	Universidad	San Pedro Sula, Cortés
16:30 (UTC−06)				Stadium: Estadio Olímpico Metropolitano

19 March 2005 Round 10	Marathón	0 – 1	Victoria	San Pedro Sula, Cortés
				Stadium: Estadio Olímpico Metropolitano

23 March 2005 Round 11	Atlético Olanchano	1 – 2	Marathón	Catacamas, Olancho
15:00 (UTC−06)				Stadium: Estadio Rubén Guifarro

2 April 2005 Round 12	Marathón	1 – 4	Platense	San Pedro Sula, Cortés
19:30 (UTC−06)			F. Ramírez	Stadium: Estadio Olímpico Metropolitano

5 April 2003 Round 13	Motagua	1 – 1	Marathón	Tegucigalpa, Francisco Morazán
19:00 (UTC−06)			Simovic	Stadium: Estadio Tiburcio Carías Andino

16 April 2005 Round 14	Marathón	0 – 0	Vida	San Pedro Sula, Cortés
16:00 (UTC−06)				Stadium: Estadio Olímpico Metropolitano

23 April 2005 Round 15	Real España	1 – 1	Marathón	San Pedro Sula, Cortés

27 April 2005 Round 16	Marathón	0 – 0	Olimpia	San Pedro Sula, Cortés
16:00 (UTC−06)				Stadium: Estadio Olímpico Metropolitano

1 May 2005 Round 17	Valencia	2 – 1	Marathón	Choluteca, Choluteca
				Stadium: Estadio Fausto Flores Lagos

7 May 2005 Round 18	Universidad	2 – 1	Marathón	Comayagua, Comayagua
19:30 (UTC−06)

==== Semifinals ====
11 May 2005 1st round	Universidad	1 – 1	Marathón	Comayagua, Comayagua
15:30 (UTC−06)	Scott		Simovic

14 May 2005 2nd leg	Marathón	0 – 0	Universidad	San Pedro Sula, Cortés
16:00 (UTC−06)				Stadium: Estadio Olímpico Metropolitano

- Marathón 1–1 Universidad on aggregate score; Marathón advanced on better Regular season performance.

==== Final ====
22 May 2005 1st leg	Marathón	1 – 1	Olimpia	San Pedro Sula, Cortés
16:00 (UTC−06)	Núñez 30'		Velásquez 20'	Stadium: Estadio Olímpico Metropolitano; Attendance: 11,000

29 May 2005 2nd leg	Olimpia	2 – 1	Marathón	Tegucigalpa, Francisco Morazán
16:00 (UTC−06)	Cárcamo 3'; Tosello 75'		Núñez 37' (pen.)	Stadium: Estadio Tiburcio Carías Andino; Attendance: 30,000

- Olimpia won 3–1 on aggregate.
