= 2002–03 Honduran Liga Nacional =

Liga Nacional
- Season: 2002–03
- Champions: Apertura: Olimpia; Clausura: Marathón
- Relegated: Victoria
- UNCAF Interclub Cup: Olimpia; Marathón
- Matches: 192
- Goals: 448 (2.33 per match)
- Top goalscorer: Apertura: (Brazil) Marcelo Ferreira (15); Clausura: (Brazil) Denilson Costa (10) (Honduras) Pompilio Cacho (10) (Brazil) Luciano Emílio (10)
- Biggest home win: Platense 5-0 Real Maya (11 August 2002)
- Biggest away win: Vida 0-6 Marathón (5 April 2003)
- All statistics correct as of 1 June 2003.

The 2002–03 season in the Honduran Liga Nacional was the 37th edition since the intervention of the professional league in Honduran football. The season was divided into two halves (Apertura and Clausura) which ran from August 2002 to June 2003.

== 2002–03 teams ==
- Honduras Salzburg (El Progreso) (promoted)
- Marathón (San Pedro Sula)
- Motagua (Tegucigalpa)
- Olimpia (Tegucigalpa)
- Platense (Tegucigalpa)
- Real España (San Pedro Sula)
- Real Maya / Real Patepluma (Comayagua)
- Universidad (Tegucigalpa)
- Victoria (La Ceiba)
- Vida (La Ceiba)
- Real Maya changed its name to Real Patepluma for the Clausura tournament and moved to Santa Bárbara.

== Apertura ==
The Apertura tournament lasted from August to December 2002, C.D. Olimpia defeated C.D. Platense in the Final to secure its 16th league title.

=== Regular season ===
==== Results ====
As of 24 November 2002

Home \ Away	SAL	MAR	MOT	OLI	PLA	RES	MAY	UNI	VIC	VID
Honduras Salzburg		1–0	1–2	2–2	2–2	0–2	2–0	0–0	0–1	1–2
Marathón	1–1		2–0	1–1	1–3	0–0	1–0	3–0	2–0	1–1
Motagua	2–1	2–2		1–2	1–0	2–3	1–0	1–2	1–0	1–1
Olimpia	1–0	2–0	1–1		1–2	1–1	3–2	1–1	1–1	3–2
Platense	1–1	2–0	2–1	1–1		1–1	5–0	0–0	3–2	2–1
Real España	0–1	0–1	3–2	0–0	1–2		4–0	3–1	1–0	3–3
Real Maya	1–1	1–1	0–2	0–0	0–4	1–1		1–1	0–0	1–1
Universidad	3–3	1–1	1–1	1–1	0–4	0–0	2–2		2–1	2–0
Victoria	1–1	1–2	1–1	1–2	0–3	2–1	1–1	3–3		0–1
Vida	1–1	0–3	1–2	0–2	1–5	1–1	1–1	1–0	1–0	

Source: RSSSF
Legend: Blue = home team win; Yellow = draw; Red = away team win.

==== Standings ====
Pos	Team	Pld	W	D	L	GF	GA	GD	Pts	Qualification or relegation
1	Platense	18	12	5	1	42	14	+28	41	Qualified to the Final round
2	Olimpia	18	7	10	1	25	17	+8	31	Qualified to the Final round
3	Marathón	18	7	7	4	22	16	+6	28	Qualified to the Final round
4	Real España	18	6	8	4	25	18	+7	26	Qualified to the Final round
5	Motagua	18	7	5	6	24	23	+1	26	
6	Universidad	18	3	11	4	20	26	−6	19 (Note: Universidad were deducted one (-1) point.)	
7	Vida	18	4	7	7	19	29	−10	19	
8	Honduras Salzburg	18	3	9	6	19	22	−3	18	
9	Real Maya	18	0	10	8	11	31	−20	14 (Note: Real Maya were added four (+4) points.)	
10	Victoria	18	2	6	10	10	15	−5	11 (Note: Victoria were deducted one (-1) point.)	

Updated to match(es) played on 24 November 2002. Source:

=== Final round ===
==== Semifinals ====
===== Platense vs Real España =====
28 November 2002 1st leg	Real España	0–2	Platense	San Pedro Sula, Cortés
18:00 (UTC−06:00)			Ferreira 19' 32'	Stadium: Estadio Olímpico Metropolitano; Attendance: 2,000

1 December 2002 2nd leg	Platense	0–1	Real España	Puerto Cortés, Cortés
15:00 (UTC−06:00)			Emílio 57'	Stadium: Estadio Excélsior; Attendance: 4,500

- Platense won 2–1 on aggregate score.

===== Olimpia vs Marathón =====
28 November 2002 1st leg	Marathón	0–2	Olimpia	San Pedro Sula, Cortés
20:00 (UTC−06:00)			Bennett; Bonilla	Stadium: Estadio Olímpico Metropolitano

1 December 2002 2nd leg	Olimpia	0–1	Marathón	Tegucigalpa, Francisco Morazán
16:00 (UTC−06:00)			Rosario	Stadium: Estadio Tiburcio Carías Andino

- Olimpia won 2–1 on aggregate score.

==== Final ====
===== Platense vs Olimpia =====
8 December 2002 1st leg	Olimpia	1–1	Platense	Tegucigalpa, Francisco Morazán
16:00 (UTC−06:00)	Velásquez 38'		Medina 13'	Stadium: Estadio Tiburcio Carías Andino; Attendance: 22,000

15 December 2002 2nd leg	Platense	1–2 (a.e.t.)	Olimpia	San Pedro Sula, Cortés
16:00 (UTC−06:00)	Tilguath 17'		Ferreira 71' (o.g.); Palacios 118'	Stadium: Estadio Olímpico Metropolitano; Attendance: 34,230

Platense	Olimpia

GK	–	(Panama) Ricardo James
RB	–	(Honduras) Elder Valladares
CB	4	(Panama) José Anthony Torres
LB	3	(Honduras) Ángel Hill
RM	10	(Honduras) Edgar Álvarez
CM	–	(Honduras) Walter Hernández
CM	–	(Honduras) Alex Andino	Substituted off
LM	–	(Honduras) Reynaldo Tilguath
RW	–	(Honduras) Clifford Laing	Substituted off
CF	9	(Brazil) Marcelo Ferreira	Substituted off
LW	–	(Argentina) Pablo Medina
Substitutions:
MF	–	(Honduras) Elmer Blanco	Substituted on
DF	–	(Honduras) Derrick Hulse	Substituted on
FW	–	(Honduras) Francisco Ramírez	Substituted on
Manager:
(Argentina) Alberto Romero

GK	–	(Panama) Donaldo González
RB	–	(Honduras) Wilson Palacios
CB	–	(Honduras) Fabio Ulloa
CB	–	(Honduras) Milton Palacios
LB	–	(Honduras) Edwin Ávila
CM	25	(Honduras) Óscar Bonilla
CM	–	(Honduras) Maynor Suazo
AM	18	(Argentina) Danilo Tosello
RF	–	(Brazil) Denilson Costa
CF	9	(Honduras) Juan Manuel Cárcamo	Substituted off
LF	11	(Honduras) Wilmer Velásquez	Substituted off
Substitutions:
FW	–	(Honduras) Eduardo Bennett	Substituted on
MF	15	(Honduras) Francis Reyes	Substituted on
Manager:
(Honduras) Juan Carlos Espinoza

- Olimpia won 3–2 on aggregate.

Liga Nacional
2002–03 Apertura Champion
Olimpia
16th title

=== Squads ===
Honduras Salzburg
(Honduras) Héctor "Tanqueta" Flores	(Honduras) Luis "Bombero" Ramírez	(Honduras) Carlos Escobar
(Honduras) Juan "Montuca" Castro	(Honduras) Luis Ramos	(Honduras) Jimmy González
(Honduras) Vinel Chamorro
Marathón
(Honduras) Carlos "Pupita" Güity	(Honduras) Mauricio Sabillón	(Honduras) Pompilio Cacho
(Honduras) Emil Martínez	(Honduras) Juan Pablo Centeno	(Honduras) Víctor Coello
(Honduras) Narciso "Kalusha" Fernández	(Honduras) Darwin Pacheco	(Honduras) Mario Berríos
(Honduras) Behiker Bustillo	(Honduras) Rubén Suazo	(Honduras) Luis Santamaría
(Honduras) Walter López	(Honduras) Anael Figueroa	(Honduras) Carlos Alberto Salinas
(Honduras) Elvis Scott	(Honduras) Luis Guifarro	(Honduras) Leonardo Morales
(Honduras) Mario López	(Honduras) Dennis Ferrera	(Honduras) Óscar Vargas
(Brazil) Jean Carles Rosario	(Honduras) Lenín Suárez	(Honduras) Orvin "Pato" Cabrera
(Honduras) David Cárcamo	(Paraguay) Alfredo Cristino Jara	(Brazil) Lisandro Silva
(Brazil) Silvian López	(Honduras) David Cáceres	(Honduras) Ilich Arias
Motagua
(Honduras) Elmer Montoya	(Honduras) Júnior Izaguirre	(Honduras) Mauricio Castro
(Argentina) José Pacini	(Honduras) Noel Valladares	(Honduras) Carlos Oliva
(Honduras) Henry Enamorado	(Honduras) Nery Medina	(Honduras) Víctor Mena
Olimpia
(Argentina) Danilo Tosello	(Panama) Donaldo González	(Honduras) Wilmer Velásquez
(Honduras) Donis Escober	(Brazil) Denilson Costa	(Honduras) Milton Palacios Suazo
(Honduras) Wilson Palacios	(Honduras) Hendry Thomas	(Honduras) Maynor Suazo
(Honduras) Hugo Caballero	(Honduras) Francis Reyes	(Honduras) José Luis Pineda
(Honduras) Juan Manuel Cárcamo	(Honduras) Eduardo Bennett	(Honduras) Juan Carlos Raudales
(Honduras) Óscar "Pescado" Bonilla	(Honduras) Edwin Yobani Ávila	(Honduras) Fabio Ulloa
Platense
(Brazil) Marcelo Ferreira	(Honduras) Jorge Zapata	(Honduras) Marvin Sánchez
(Honduras) Elmer Zelaya	(Honduras) Reynaldo Tilguath	(Panama) Ricardo James
(Honduras) Edgar Álvarez	(Honduras) Clifford Laing	(Panama) José Anthony Torres
(Argentina) Gustavo Scioscia	(Argentina) Pablo Medina	(Honduras) David Meléndez
(Honduras) Jorge Espinoza	(Honduras) Rony Morales	(Honduras) Ángel "Búfalo" Hill
(Honduras) Walter Hernández	(Honduras) Alex Andino	(Honduras) Elder Valladares
(Honduras) Derrick Hulse	(Honduras) Francisco Ramírez	(Honduras) Elmer Blanco
Real España
(Honduras) Nigel Zúniga	(Honduras) Marlon José Peña	(Honduras) Enrique Renau
(Honduras) Jaime Rosales	(Brazil) Rafael Betine	(Honduras) Milton "Chocolate" Flores
(Honduras) Júnior Morales	(Honduras) Erick Vallecillo	(Honduras) Sergio Mendoza
(Brazil) Luciano Emílio
Real Maya/Real Patepluma
(Honduras) Rony Flores	(Honduras) Cristino Bernárdez
Universidad
(Honduras) Jaime Ruíz
Victoria
(Honduras) Ricardo Gabriel "Gato" Canales	(Honduras) John Bodden	(Honduras) Carlos Lino
(Honduras) Carlos Discua	(Honduras) Ronald "Cuervo" Maradiaga	(Honduras) Mario Chávez
(Honduras) José García	(Honduras) Luis Lagos	(Honduras) Carlos "Tatín" Morán
(Honduras) Pablo Bernárdez	(Honduras) Reynaldo "Chino" Pineda	(Honduras) Óscar Sorto
(Honduras) Hesler Phillips	(Honduras) Miguel "Gallo" Mariano	(Honduras) Carlos "Calolo" Palacios
(Honduras) Alex Roberto Bailey	(Honduras) Máximo Arzú	(Honduras) Wilmer Ramos
Vida
(Honduras) Jonathan Bush Sanders	(Honduras) Luis Perdomo	(Honduras) Renán "Chimbo" Aguilera
(Honduras) Jorge Ocampo

Jose Gonzales

=== Top goalscorers ===
15 goals

- (Brazil) Marcelo Ferreira (Platense)

11 goals

- (Brazil) Luciano Emílio (Real España)

6 goals

- (Brazil) Denilson Costa (Olimpia)

== Clausura ==
The Clausura tournament was played from February to June 2003. C.D. Marathón took revenge a year and a half later and defeated C.D. Motagua in the finals to claim its 4th league title.

=== Regular season ===
==== Results ====
As of 10 May 2003

Home \ Away	SAL	MAR	MOT	OLI	PLA	RES	PAT	UNI	VIC	VID
Honduras Salzburg		1–0	2–3	1–1	1–1	1–1	0–0	0–0	0–2	3–1
Marathón	2–0		2–3	1–0	1–0	0–1	1–0	4–1	2–0	4–2
Motagua	2–0	0–1		2–3	0–0	0–0	2–1	0–0	0–0	0–1
Olimpia	1–0	4–1	0–2		3–3	3–1	1–0	1–0	4–2	4–1
Platense	2–1	3–2	1–1	2–3		0–1	0–0	0–2	1–1	0–1
Real España	3–0	1–1	0–0	1–0	0–3		3–1	1–1	2–1	1–1
Real Patepluma	2–0	0–4	0–1	1–1	0–1	1–0		0–1	0–0	2–2
Universidad	2–0	1–1	0–1	0–0	0–0	0–4	0–0		1–1	1–0
Victoria	2–2	0–0	1–1	0–2	1–1	0–2	0–3	3–1		3–2
Vida	2–0	0–6	1–1	1–1	2–0	2–3	1–0	1–0	3–1	

Source: RSSSF
Legend: Blue = home team win; Yellow = draw; Red = away team win.

==== Standings ====
Pos	Team	Pld	W	D	L	GF	GA	GD	Pts	Qualification or relegation
1	Olimpia	18	10	5	3	32	19	+13	35	Qualified to the Final round
2	Marathón	18	10	3	5	33	17	+16	33	Qualified to the Final round
3	Real España	18	9	6	3	25	15	+10	33	Qualified to the Final round
4	Motagua	18	7	8	3	19	13	+6	29	Qualified to the Final round
5	Vida	18	7	4	7	24	30	−6	25	
6	Platense	18	4	8	6	18	20	−2	20	
7	Universidad	18	4	8	6	11	17	−6	20	
8	Victoria	18	3	8	7	18	27	−9	17	
9	Real Patepluma	18	3	6	9	11	18	−7	15	
10	Honduras Salzburg	18	2	6	10	12	27	−15	12	

Updated to match(es) played on 10 May 2003. Source:

=== Final round ===
==== Semifinals ====
===== Olimpia vs Motagua =====
15 May 2003 1st leg	Motagua	2–2	Olimpia	Tegucigalpa, Francisco Morazán
19:30 (UTC−06:00)	Bocco 74'; Guerrero 84'		Tosello 12'; Palacios 23'	Stadium: Estadio Tiburcio Carías Andino; Referee: Óscar Bardales

18 May 2003 2nd leg	Olimpia	0–2	Motagua	Tegucigalpa, Francisco Morazán
16:00 (UTC−06:00)			Valladares 85'; Martínez 90'	Stadium: Estadio Tiburcio Carías Andino; Attendance: 27,000

- Motagua won 4–2 on aggregate score.

===== Marathón vs Real España =====
14 May 2003 1st leg	Real España	1–1	Marathón	San Pedro Sula, Cortés
19:30 (UTC−06:00)	Jiménez 38'		Cacho 66'	Stadium: Estadio Olímpico Metropolitano

17 May 2003 2nd leg	Marathón	1–1	Real España	San Pedro Sula, Cortés
19:30 (UTC−06:00)	Fernández 71'		Betine 22'	Stadium: Estadio Olímpico Metropolitano

- Marathón 2–2 Real España on aggregate score; Marathón advanced on better Regular season performance.

==== Final ====
===== Marathón vs Motagua =====
25 May 2003 1st leg	Motagua	0–1	Marathón	Tegucigalpa, Francisco Morazán
16:00 (UTC−06:00)			Martínez 65'	Stadium: Estadio Tiburcio Carías Andino; Attendance: 21,691; Referee: Óscar Bardales

Motagua	Marathón

GK	–	(Honduras) Henry Enamorado
CB	–	(Honduras) Víctor Bernárdez
CB	–	(Honduras) Jorge Lozano
CB	–	(Honduras) Elmer Montoya	Substituted off
RWB	–	(Honduras) Samir García	Substituted off
LWB	–	(Honduras) Iván Guerrero
CM	–	(Honduras) Faussy Rodríguez	Substituted off
CM	–	(Honduras) Víctor Mena
CM	–	(Honduras) Mauricio Castro
SS	6	(Argentina) Pablo Bocco
CF	8	(Honduras) Jairo Martínez
Substitutions:
MF	–	(Honduras) Francisco Pavón	Substituted on
MF	–	(Honduras) Marlon Nolasco	Substituted on
FW	–	(Honduras) Luis Oseguera	Substituted on
Manager:
(Mexico) Alejandro Domínguez

GK	1	(Honduras) Víctor Coello
RB	23	(Honduras) Mauricio Sabillón
CB	5	(Honduras) Darwin Pacheco
CB	6	(Honduras) José Luis López
LB	3	(Honduras) Behiker Bustillo
RM	–	(Honduras) Walter López
CM	20	(Honduras) Narciso Fernández
CM	24	(Honduras) Luis Guifarro	Substituted off
LM	7	(Honduras) Emil Martínez	(red card) 66'
CF	10	(Brazil) Denilson Costa	Substituted off
CF	17	(Honduras) Pompilio Cacho	Substituted off
Substitutions:
MF	–	(Honduras) Daniel Muñoz	Substituted on
FW	9	(Argentina) José Pacini	Substituted on
MF	–	(Honduras) Carlos Güity	Substituted on
Manager:
(Brazil) (Honduras) Flavio Ortega

1 June 2003 2nd leg	Marathón	3–1	Motagua	San Pedro Sula, Cortés
16:00 (UTC−06:00)	Cacho 45+2'; Costa 66' 90+13'		Oseguera 39'	Stadium: Estadio Olímpico Metropolitano; Attendance: 35,745; Referee: Marcio Carranza

Marathón	Motagua

GK	1	(Honduras) Víctor Coello
RB	23	(Honduras) Mauricio Sabillón
CB	5	(Honduras) Darwin Pacheco
CB	3	(Honduras) José Luis López	Substituted off
LB	6	(Honduras) Behiker Bustillo
RM	–	(Honduras) Walter López
CM	20	(Honduras) Narciso Fernández
CM	24	(Honduras) Luis Guifarro
LM	–	(Honduras) Carlos Güity	Substituted off
CF	10	(Brazil) Denilson Costa
CF	17	(Honduras) Pompilio Cacho
Substitutions:
MF	–	(Honduras) Ilich Arias	Substituted on
DF	4	(Honduras) Lenín Suárez	Substituted on
Manager:
(Brazil) (Honduras) Flavio Ortega

GK	–	(Honduras) Henry Enamorado
RB	–	(Honduras) Samir García
CB	–	(Honduras) Jorge Lozano
CB	–	(Honduras) Elmer Montoya	Substituted off
LB	-	(Honduras) Iván Guerrero
RM	–	(Honduras) Víctor Mena
CM	–	(Honduras) Robel Bernárdez
CM	–	(Honduras) Francisco Pavón
LM	–	(Honduras) Mauricio Castro
CF	–	(Honduras) Luis Oseguera
CF	8	(Honduras) Jairo Martínez	Substituted off
Substitutions:
MF	6	(Argentina) Pablo Bocco	Substituted on
MF	–	(Honduras) Avidán Solís	Substituted on
Manager:
(Mexico) Alejandro Domínguez

- Marathón won 4–1 on aggregate score.

Liga Nacional
2002–03 Clausura Champion
Marathón
4th title

=== Squads ===
Honduras Salzburg
(Honduras) Héctor "Tanqueta" Flores	(Honduras) Luis "Bombero" Ramírez	(Honduras) Carlos Escobar
(Honduras) Juan "Montuca" Castro	(Honduras) Luis Ramos	(Honduras) Jimmy González
(Honduras) Vinel Chamorro
Marathón
(Honduras) Carlos "Pupita" Güity	(Honduras) Mauricio Sabillón	(Honduras) Pompilio Cacho
(Honduras) Emil Martínez	(Honduras) Hugo Caballero	(Honduras) Víctor Coello
(Honduras) Narciso "Kalusha" Fernández	(Honduras) Darwin Pacheco	(Honduras) Mario Berríos
(Honduras) Behiker Bustillo	(Honduras) José Luis López	(Honduras) Luis Santamaría
(Honduras) Walter López	(Argentina) Juan Manuel Zandoná	(Honduras) Carlos Alberto Salinas
(Brazil) (Honduras) Denilson Costa	(Honduras) Luis Guifarro	(Argentina) José Pacini
(Honduras) Lenín Suárez	(Honduras) Dennis Ferrera	(Honduras) Óscar Vargas
(Honduras) Leonardo Morales	(Honduras) Ilich Arias	(Honduras) David Cáceres
(Honduras) Antonio Arita
Motagua
(Honduras) Elmer Montoya	(Honduras) Júnior Izaguirre	(Honduras) Mauricio Castro
(Argentina) Pablo Bocco	(Honduras) Noel Valladares	(Honduras) Juan Raudales
(Honduras) Samir García	(Honduras) Jairo Martínez	(Honduras) Luis "Tanque" Oseguera
(Honduras) Avidán Solís	(Honduras) Francisco Pavón	(Honduras) Robel Bernárdez
(Honduras) Víctor Mena	(Honduras) Iván Guerrero	(Honduras) Henry Enamorado
(Honduras) Jorge "Tata" Lozano
Olimpia
(Argentina) Danilo Tosello	(Panama) Donaldo González	(Honduras) Wilmer Velásquez
(Honduras) Donis Escober	(Brazil) Marcelo Ferreira	(Honduras) Milton Palacios Suazo
(Honduras) Wilson Palacios	(Honduras) Hendry Thomas	(Honduras) Maynor Suazo
(Honduras) Maynor Figueroa	(Honduras) Francis Reyes	(Honduras) José Luis Pineda
(Honduras) Jerry Palacios	(Honduras) Óscar "Pescado" Bonilla
Platense
(Honduras) Francisco Ramírez	(Honduras) Jorge Zapata	(Honduras) Marvin Sánchez
(Honduras) Elmer Zelaya	(Honduras) Reynaldo Tilguath	(Panama) Ricardo James
(Honduras) Ángel "Búfalo" Hill	(Honduras) Clifford Laing	(Panama) José Anthony Torres
(Argentina) Gustavo Scioscia	(Honduras) Pablo Medina	(Honduras) David Meléndez
(Honduras) Rony Morales	(Honduras) Jorge Espinoza
Real España
(Honduras) Nigel Zúniga	(Honduras) Marlon José Peña	(Honduras) Enrique Renau
(Honduras) Jaime Rosales	(Brazil) Rafael Betine	(Honduras) Milton "Chocolate" Flores
(Honduras) Júnior Morales	(Honduras) Erick Vallecillo	(Brazil) Luciano Emílio
(Honduras) Sergio Mendoza	(Honduras) Javier Martínez	(Brazil) Pedro Santana
Real Maya/Real Patepluma
(Honduras) Rony Flores	(Honduras) Cristino Bernárdez
Universidad
(Honduras) Jaime Ruíz	(Argentina) Diego Vásquez
Victoria
(Honduras) Ricardo Gabriel "Gato" Canales	(Honduras) John Bodden	(Honduras) Carlos Lino
(Honduras) Carlos Discua	(Honduras) Ronald "Cuervo" Maradiaga	(Honduras) Mario Chávez
(Honduras) José García	(Honduras) Luis Lagos	(Honduras) Carlos "Tatín" Morán
(Honduras) Pablo Bernárdez	(Honduras) Reynaldo "Chino" Pineda	(Honduras) Óscar Sorto
(Honduras) Hesler Phillips	(Honduras) Miguel "Gallo" Mariano	(Honduras) Carlos "Calolo" Palacios
(Honduras) Alex Roberto Bailey	(Honduras) Máximo Arzú	(Honduras) Wilmer Ramos
(Honduras) Walter "Pery" Martínez	(Honduras) Marvin Morán	(Honduras) Marvin Chávez
(Honduras) Samir George	(Honduras) Ignacio Mejía	(Honduras) Johnny Rivera
(Honduras) Dionisio Bátiz	(Honduras) Carlos Mena	(Honduras) Marlon López
(Honduras) Norlan García
Vida
(Honduras) Jonathan Bush Sanders	(Honduras) Luis Perdomo	(Honduras) Renán "Chimbo" Aguilera
(Honduras) Jorge Ocampo	(Honduras) Saynor Álvarez	(Honduras) Víctor "Muma" Bernárdez

=== Top goalscorers ===
10 goals

- (Brazil) Luciano Emílio (Real España)
- (Honduras) Pompilio Cacho (C.D. Marathón)
- (Brazil) (Honduras) Denilson Costa (C.D. Marathón)

8 goals

- (Honduras) Wilmer Velásquez (Olimpia)

6 goals

- (Brazil) Pedro Santana (Real España)

6 goals

- (Honduras) Jairo Martínez (Motagua)
- (Honduras) José Pacini (Marathón)

5 goals

- (Argentina) Danilo Tosello (Olimpia)
- (Honduras) Luis Oseguera (Motagua)

4 goals

- (Honduras) Emil Martínez (Marathón)
- (Honduras) Francisco Ramírez (Platense)
- (Brazil) Marcelo Ferreira (Olimpia)
- (Honduras) Abidán Solís (Motagua)

3 goals

- (Honduras) Clifford Laing (Platense)

== Relegation ==
Relegation was determined by the aggregated table of both Apertura and Clausura tournaments. On 10 May 2003, C.D. Victoria were relegated to Liga de Ascenso, however they bought Honduras Salzburg's franchise and stayed in first division.

Pos	Team	Pld	W	D	L	GF	GA	GD	Pts	Qualification or relegation
1	Olimpia	36	17	15	4	57	36	+21	66	
2	Platense	36	16	13	7	60	34	+26	61	
3	Marathón	36	17	10	9	55	33	+22	61	
4	Real España	36	15	14	7	50	33	+17	59	
5	Motagua	36	14	13	9	43	36	+7	55	
6	Vida	36	11	11	14	43	59	−16	44	
7	Universidad	36	7	19	10	31	43	−12	39 (Note: Universidad were deducted a total –1 point.)	
8	Honduras Salzburg	36	5	15	16	31	49	−18	30	
9	Real Patepluma	36	3	16	17	22	49	−27	29 (Note: Real Patepluma were added a total +4 points.)	
10	Victoria	36	5	14	17	33	56	−23	28 (Note: Victoria were deducted a total –1 point.)	Relegation to the 2003–04 Liga de Ascenso

Updated to match(es) played on 10 May 2003. Source:

== Controversies ==
During the Apertura tournament, C.D. Marathón hosted Real C.D. España on week 9, the match was played on 28 September and ended with a 0–2 away win to Real España. During halftime, Real España delayed more than 15 minutes and returned late to play the second half. Marathón alleged and the Board of Discipline annulled the game. A rematch was played on 13 October ending in a 0–0 draw. Such decision affected the final standings which resulted in Marathón owning the third place and sent Real España to fourth.
