= 2001–02 Honduran Liga Nacional =

Liga Nacional
- Season: 2001–02
- Champions: Apertura: Motagua; Clausura: Marathón
- Relegated: Deportes Savio
- Copa Interclubes UNCAF: Motagua; Marathón
- Top goalscorer: Apertura: (Honduras) Enrique Renau (8); Clausura: (Brazil) Marcelo Ferreira (13)
- Biggest home win: Victoria 4-1 Deportes Savio (19 September 2001); Marathón 4-1 Universidad (26 January 2002); Olimpia 4-1 Universidad (13 April 2002); Marathón 4-1 Olimpia (23 May 2002)
- Biggest away win: Marathón 0-5 Real España (2 December 2001); Deportes Savio 2-6 Platense (10 February 2002)
- Highest scoring: Marathón 6-3 Victoria (22 September 2001)
- All statistics correct as of 26 May 2002.

The 2001–02 season in the Honduran Liga Nacional was divided into two phases, the Apertura tournament which lasted from September to December 2001, and the Clausura tournament which was played from January to May 2002. C.D. Motagua and C.D. Marathón each lifted one trophy obtaining the 39th and 40th national championship respectively in the history of the league. This was the fourth season under the Apertura and Clausura format.

== 2001–02 teams ==
- Deportes Savio (Santa Rosa de Copán)
- Marathón (San Pedro Sula)
- Motagua (Tegucigalpa)
- Olimpia (Tegucigalpa)
- Platense (Puerto Cortés)
- Real Comayagua (Comayagua) (promoted)
- Real España (San Pedro Sula)
- Universidad (Tegucigalpa)
- Victoria (La Ceiba)
- Vida (La Ceiba)

== Apertura ==
The Apertura tournament started on 7 September 2001 in La Ceiba with Victoria's 2–1 home win over last season's runners-up Olimpia. After 18 rounds Motagua, Marathón, Platense, and Olimpia qualified to the Final round to fight for the title.

=== Regular season ===
==== Standings ====
Pos	Team	Pld	W	D	L	GF	GA	GD	Pts	Qualification or relegation
1	Motagua	18	8	8	2	22	13	+9	32	Qualified to the Final round
2	Marathón	18	8	7	3	28	22	+6	31	Qualified to the Final round
3	Platense	18	7	6	5	16	14	+2	27	Qualified to the Final round
4	Olimpia	18	6	7	5	25	18	+7	25	Qualified to the Final round
5	Real España	18	5	9	4	21	15	+6	24	
6	Victoria	18	5	9	4	28	26	+2	24	
7	Vida	18	3	11	4	20	23	−3	20	
8	Real Comayagua	18	3	10	5	22	27	−5	19	
9	Universidad	18	3	6	9	20	31	−11	15	
10	Deportes Savio	18	1	9	8	19	32	−13	12	

Updated to match(es) played on 2 December 2001. Source:

==== Results ====
As of 2 December 2001

Home \ Away	SAV	MAR	MOT	OLI	PLA	COM	RES	UNI	VIC	VID
Deportes Savio		0–3	1–1	0–2	1–1	2–2	1–1	1–0	3–3	0–1
Marathón	3–3		0–0	1–2	1–1	1–0	0–5	3–3	6–3	1–1
Motagua	2–1	2–1		2–0	1–0	2–0	3–3	0–1	1–1	2–0
Olimpia	3–3	0–1	0–0		0–0	2–2	0–0	2–0	1–2	2–2
Platense	1–0	0–1	0–0	1–3		1–2	1–0	2–1	2–1	2–0
Real Comayagua	1–1	2–2	0–1	0–3	0–0		1–0	1–2	1–1	1–0
Real España	1–0	0–1	1–1	1–0	1–0	2–2		2–0	0–0	1–1
Universidad	3–0	0–0	1–2	0–3	0–1	2–2	3–3		1–4	1–1
Victoria	4–1	0–2	1–0	2–1	0–1	2–2	0–0	1–1		1–1
Vida	0–0	0–1	2–2	1–1	2–2	3–3	1–0	2–1	2–2	

Source: RSSSF
Legend: Blue = home team win; Yellow = draw; Red = away team win.

=== Final round ===
==== Semifinals ====
===== Motagua vs Olimpia =====
6 December 2001
19:30 (UTC−06:00)

Olimpia	1–0	Motagua
Fuentes 46'

Estadio Tiburcio Carías Andino
Tegucigalpa

9 December 2001
16:00 (UTC−06:00)

Motagua	4–2	Olimpia
García 26'; Pacini 32' 39'; Mejía 87'	Video report	Velásquez 5'; Costa 37'

Estadio Tiburcio Carías Andino
Tegucigalpa
Referee: Óscar Bardales
- Motagua won 4–3 on aggregate.

===== Marathón vs Platense =====
5 December 2001
19:30 (UTC−06:00)

Platense	1–2	Marathón
Fernández 23'		Correia 5'; González 79'

Estadio Excélsior
Puerto Cortés

8 December 2001
19:30 (UTC−06:00)

Marathón	1–1	Platense
Cacho 58'		Fernández 38'

Estadio Francisco Morazán
San Pedro Sula
- Marathón won 3–2 on aggregate.

==== Final ====
===== Motagua vs Marathón =====
12 December 2001
19:30 (UTC−06:00)

Marathón	3–2	Motagua
Rosales 69' (pen.) 82' 89'		74' 86'

Estadio Francisco Morazán
San Pedro Sula
Attendance: 14,283
Referee: Benigno Pineda

Marathón	Motagua

GK	21	(Honduras) Juan Centeno
RB	23	(Honduras) Mauricio Sabillón
CB	8	(Honduras) Jaime Rosales
CB	3	(Honduras) Behiker Bustillo
CB	4	(Honduras) Lenín Suárez
LB	6	(Honduras) Nigel Zúniga
RM	20	(Honduras) Carlos Oliva
CM	24	(Honduras) Luis Guifarro
LM	11	(Honduras) Mario López	(substituted off) 72'
SS	10	(Honduras) Enrique Renau
CF	17	(Honduras) Pompilio Cacho
Substitutions:
MF	22	(Honduras) Emil Martínez	(substituted on) 72'
Manager:
(Honduras) José Herrera

GK	–	(Argentina) Diego Vásquez
RB	–	(Honduras) Ninrrol Medina (C)
CB	–	(Honduras) Jorge Lozano
CB	–	(Honduras) Mario Chirinos
LB	4	(Honduras) Júnior Izaguirre	(substituted off) 80'
RM	13	(Honduras) Elmer Mejía
CM	–	(Honduras) Marlon Nolasco	(substituted off) 60'
CM	–	(Honduras) Ramón Romero
LM	19	(Honduras) Danilo Turcios
CF	29	(Argentina) José Pacini
CF	26	(Argentina) Marcelo Verón
Substitutions:
MF	–	(Argentina) Ariel Leyes	(substituted on) 60'
DF	–	(Honduras) Milton Reyes	(substituted on) 80'
Manager:
(Honduras) Gilberto Yearwood

16 December 2001
16:00 (UTC−06:00)

Motagua	3–2	Marathón
Pacini 22'; Izaguirre 44' (pen.) 56' (pen.)	Video report	Rosales 18' (pen.); Oliva 81'
Penalties
Leyes (penalty scored); Medina (penalty scored); Pacini (penalty scored); Turcios (penalty scored); Izaguirre (penalty scored)	5–3	(penalty missed) Cacho; (penalty scored) Zúniga; (penalty scored) Oliva; (penalty scored) Martínez

Estadio Tiburcio Carías Andino
Tegucigalpa
Attendance: 20,423
Referee: Óscar Bardales

Motagua	Marathón

GK	18	(Honduras) Noel Valladares
RB	–	(Honduras) Milton Reyes
CB	–	(Honduras) Ninrrol Medina (C)
CB	–	(Honduras) Jorge Lozano
LB	4	(Honduras) Júnior Izaguirre
RM	–	(Honduras) Marlon Nolasco	(substituted off) 76'
CM	–	(Honduras) Ramón Romero	(substituted off) 46'
CM	19	(Honduras) Danilo Turcios
LM	7	(Honduras) Róbel Bernárdez
CF	29	(Argentina) José Pacini
CF	26	(Argentina) Marcelo Verón	(red card) 12'
Substitutions:
MF	13	(Honduras) Elmer Mejía	(substituted on) 46'
MF	–	(Argentina) Ariel Leyes	(substituted on) 76'
Manager:
(Honduras) Gilberto Yearwood

GK	21	(Honduras) Juan Centeno	Booked
RB	23	(Honduras) Mauricio Sabillón
CB	8	(Honduras) Jaime Rosales
CB	3	(Honduras) Behiker Bustillo
CB	4	(Honduras) Lenín Suárez	(red card) 43'
LB	6	(Honduras) Nigel Zúniga
CM	20	(Honduras) Carlos Oliva
CM	24	(Honduras) Luis Guifarro	(substituted off) 77'
AM	10	(Honduras) Enrique Renau	(substituted off) 58'
CF	9	(Brazil) Ricardo Correia	Booked	(substituted off) 59'
CF	17	(Honduras) Pompilio Cacho
Substitutions:
MF	22	(Honduras) Emil Martínez	(substituted on) 58'
FW	25	(Honduras) Jimmy González	(substituted on) 59'
MF	11	(Honduras) Mario López	(substituted on) 77'
Manager:
(Honduras) José Herrera

- Motagua 3–3 Marathón on aggregate; Motagua won 5–3 on penalty shootouts.

Liga Nacional
2001–02 Apertura Champion
C.D. Motagua
10th title

=== Squads ===
Deportes Savio
(Honduras) Wilmer "Superman" Cruz	(Honduras) Clayd Lester Marson	(Honduras) Juan García
(Honduras) Marlon Monge	(Honduras) José "Runga" Piota	(Honduras) Wilmer Ramos
(Honduras) José Suazo	(Honduras) Marlon Barnica	(Honduras) Delvin Andino
Marathón
(Honduras) Jaime Rosales	(Honduras) Mauricio Sabillón	(Honduras) Pompilio Cacho
(Honduras) Emil Martínez	(Honduras) Juan Pablo Centeno	(Argentina) Fernando Regules
(Honduras) Narciso "Kalusha" Fernández	(Honduras) Darwin Pacheco	(Honduras) Mario Berríos
(Honduras) Behiker Bustillo	(Honduras) Enrique Reneau	(Honduras) Jimmy González
(Honduras) Óscar Vargas	(Honduras) Dennis Ferrera	(Honduras) Douglas Murillo
(Brazil) Ricardo Correia	(Honduras) Luis Guifarro	(Honduras) Camilo Bonilla
(Honduras) Mario López	(Honduras) Lenín Suárez	(Honduras) Nigel Zúniga
(Honduras) Carlos Oliva
Motagua
(Honduras) Elmer Montoya	(Honduras) Júnior Izaguirre	(Honduras) Mauricio "Pipo" Castro
(Argentina) José Pacini	(Honduras) Noel Valladares	(Honduras) Juan Raudales
(Argentina) Marcelo Verón	(Honduras) Mario Chirinos	(Honduras) Ricky García
(Honduras) Jorge "Tata" Lozano	(Honduras) César "Nene" Obando	(Honduras) Elmer "Burrito" Mejía
(Honduras) Robel Bernárdez	(Honduras) Marlon Nolasco	(Honduras) Francisco Ramírez
(Honduras) Milton "Jocón" Reyes	(Honduras) Faussy Rodríguez	(Honduras) Ramón Romero
(Honduras) Dennis Salgado	(Honduras) Danilo Turcios	(Argentina) Diego Vásquez
(Honduras) Nimrod Medina
Olimpia
(Argentina) Danilo Tosello	(Panama) Donaldo González	(Honduras) Wilmer Velásquez
(Honduras) Donis Escober	(Brazil) Denilson Costa	(Uruguay) Hugo Domínguez
(Argentina) Gustavo Fuentes	(Honduras) Hendry Thomas	(Brazil) Marcelo Ferreira
(Honduras) Merlyn Membreño	(Honduras) Fabio Ulloa	(Argentina) Diego de Rosa
(Honduras) Carlos Paes
Platense
(Argentina) Diego Fernández	(Honduras) Jorge Zapata	(Honduras) Ángel "Búfalo" Hill
(Honduras) Elmer Zelaya	(Honduras) Fabricio Pérez	(Panama) Ricardo James
(Honduras) Edgar Álvarez	(Honduras) Clifford Laing	(Panama) José Anthony Torres
(Honduras) Víctor Coello	(Honduras) Pablo Medina	(Honduras) Mario Beata
Real España
(Honduras) Erick Vallecillo	(Honduras) Marlon José Peña	(Honduras) Milton "Chocolate" Flores
(Honduras) David Cárcamo	(Honduras) Júnior Morales	(Honduras) Héctor Gutiérrez
Real Comayagua
(Honduras) Rudy Williams
Universidad
(Honduras) Héctor Cardona	(Honduras) Marlon Hernández	(Honduras) Mario Herrera
(Honduras) Luis "Bombero" Ramírez
Victoria
(Honduras) Ricardo Gabriel "Gato" Canales	(Honduras) John Bodden	(Honduras) Carlos Lino
(Honduras) Carlos Discua	(Honduras) Ronald "Cuervo" Maradiaga	(Honduras) Mauricio Figueroa
(Honduras) Jorge Pineda	(Honduras) Luis Lagos	(Honduras) Carlos "Tatín" Morán
(Honduras) Miguel "Gallo" Mariano	(Honduras) Reynaldo "Chino" Pineda	(Honduras) Mario Chávez
Vida
(Honduras) Jonathan Bush Sanders	(Honduras) Luis Perdomo	(Honduras) Renán "Chimbo" Aguilera
(Honduras) Jorge Ocampo	(Honduras) Saynor Álvarez	(Honduras) Marvin Brown
(Honduras) Justo Norales

=== Top goalscorers ===
8 goals

- (Honduras) Enrique Renau (Marathón)

7 goals

- (Argentina) Marcelo Verón (Motagua)
- (Brazil) Denilson Costa (Olimpia)

6 goals

- (Argentina) José Pacini (Motagua)
- (Argentina) Danilo Tosello (Olimpia)

5 goals

- (Honduras) Wilmer Velásquez (Olimpia)
- (Honduras) Pompilio Cacho (Marathón)
- (Argentina) Gustavo Fuentes (Olimpia)

== Clausura ==
The Clausura tournament was the second part of the 2001–02 season in Liga Nacional; the league games started on 19 January 2002 in La Ceiba with an unexpected 0–3 C.D. Victoria's home defeat against Deportes Savio. The previous champions C.D. Motagua was unable to qualify to the Final round and C.D. Marathón earned its first title after 20 long years.

=== Regular season ===
==== Standings ====
Pos	Team	Pld	W	D	L	GF	GA	GD	Pts	Qualification or relegation
1	Olimpia	18	9	6	3	31	16	+15	33	Qualified to the Final round
2	Platense	18	9	4	5	35	25	+10	31	Qualified to the Final round
3	Marathón	18	8	5	5	27	21	+6	29	Qualified to the Final round
4	Victoria	18	6	7	5	19	21	−2	25	Qualified to the Final round
5	Real España	18	5	8	5	16	15	+1	23	
6	Universidad	18	5	8	5	13	18	−5	23	
7	Deportes Savio	18	6	3	9	19	25	−6	21	
8	Motagua	18	4	7	7	12	16	−4	19	
9	Vida	18	3	10	5	16	21	−5	19	
10	Real Comayagua	18	4	4	10	20	30	−10	16	

Updated to match(es) played on 12 May 2002. Source:

==== Results ====
As of 12 May 2002

Home \ Away	SAV	MAR	MOT	OLI	PLA	COM	RES	UNI	VIC	VID
Deportes Savio		0–2	0–0	2–3	2–6	0–3	0–1	3–0	0–0	1–0
Marathón	0–0		1–0	0–2	1–1	3–1	2–1	4–1	3–3	2–2
Motagua	0–3	1–1		2–1	1–0	0–1	0–1	2–0	0–1	1–1
Olimpia	1–2	3–1	0–0		2–3	3–2	1–0	4–1	2–0	1–1
Platense	3–1	2–1	3–1	0–3		3–1	1–1	0–1	3–1	0–0
Real Comayagua	3–0	0–1	2–2	0–3	3–1		1–1	0–3	1–1	1–2
Real España	0–1	2–1	0–2	0–0	2–4	2–0		0–0	0–0	3–0
Universidad	1–0	2–1	0–0	0–0	0–0	2–0	0–0		1–1	0–0
Victoria	0–3	0–2	1–0	1–1	1–3	2–0	1–1	2–0		2–0
Vida	2–1	0–1	0–0	1–1	3–2	1–1	1–1	1–1	1–2	

Source: RSSSF
Legend: Blue = home team win; Yellow = draw; Red = away team win.

=== Final round ===
==== Semifinals ====
===== Olimpia vs Victoria =====
15 May 2002
19:30 (UTC−06:00)

Victoria	0–1	Olimpia
		Tosello 79'

Estadio Nilmo Edwards
La Ceiba

19 May 2002
16:00 (UTC−06:00)

Olimpia	2–2	Victoria
Costa 35'; Velásquez 71'		Palacios 74'; Martinez 85'

Estadio Tiburcio Carías Andino
Tegucigalpa
Attendance: 7,170
- Olimpia won 3–2 on aggregate.

===== Platense vs Marathón =====
16 May 2002
19:30 (UTC−06:00)

Marathón	2–1	Platense
Renau 30' 45'		C. Laing 82'

Estadio Olímpico Metropolitano
San Pedro Sula
Attendance: 6260
Referee: Óscar Bardales

19 May 2002
15:00 (UTC−06:00)

Platense	0–0	Marathón

Estadio Excélsior
Puerto Cortés
Attendance: 6,544
- Marathón won 2–1 on aggregate.

==== Final ====
===== Olimpia vs Marathón =====
23 May 2002
19:30 (UTC−06:00)

Marathón	4–1	Olimpia
Zúniga 44' (pen.); Reneau 49' 52'; Vargas 85'		Tosello 60'

Estadio Olímpico Metropolitano
San Pedro Sula
Attendance: 27,394
Referee: Óscar Bardales

Marathón	Olimpia

GK	1	(Honduras) Víctor Coello
RB	23	(Honduras) Mauricio Sabillón	(substituted off) 85'
CB	8	(Honduras) Jaime Rosales
CB	5	(Honduras) Darwin Pacheco
LB	6	(Honduras) Nigel Zúniga
RM	7	(Honduras) Emil Martínez	(substituted off) 70'
CM	24	(Honduras) Luis Guifarro
LM	19	(Honduras) Mario Berríos
AM	20	(Honduras) Carlos Oliva
CF	10	(Honduras) Enrique Reneau
CF	17	(Honduras) Pompilio Cacho	(substituted off) 46'
Substitutions:
FW	–	(Honduras) Óscar Vargas	(substituted on) 46'
DF	–	(Honduras) Douglas Murillo	(substituted on) 70' (red card) 90'
DF	15	(Honduras) Walter López	(substituted on) 85'
Manager:
(Honduras) José Herrera

GK	28	(Honduras) Donis Escober
RB	–	(Honduras) Gerson Vásquez
CB	–	(Honduras) Fabio Ulloa
CB	23	(Honduras) Mario Beata
LB	5	(Honduras) Merlyn Membreño	(substituted off) 79'
RM	–	(Honduras) Wilson Palacios
CM	10	(Argentina) Diego de Rosa
DM	8	(Honduras) José Luis Pineda
CM	18	(Argentina) Danilo Tosello
LM	–	(Honduras) Narciso Fernández	(substituted off) 46'
CF	11	(Honduras) Wilmer Velásquez	(substituted off) 66'
Substitutions:
FW	9	(Argentina) Gustavo Fuentes	(substituted on) 46'
FW	19	(Brazil) Denilson Costa	(substituted on) 66'
DF	–	(Honduras) Limber Pérez	(substituted on) 79'
Manager:
(Honduras) Edwin Pavón

26 May 2002
16:00 (UTC−06:00)

Olimpia	1–0	Marathón
Fuentes 7'

Estadio Tiburcio Carías Andino
Tegucigalpa
Attendance: 15,187
Referee: Argelio Sabillón

Olimpia	Marathón

GK	28	(Honduras) Donis Escober
CB	–	(Honduras) Fabio Ulloa	(substituted off) 57'
CB	23	(Honduras) Mario Beata
CB	5	(Honduras) Merlyn Membreño	(substituted off) 46'
RWB	–	(Honduras) Gerson Vásquez	Booked
CM	8	(Honduras) José Luis Pineda	Booked
CM	18	(Argentina) Danilo Tosello	Booked
LWB	4	(Honduras) Edwin Ávila
RF	19	(Brazil) Denilson Costa
CF	9	(Argentina) Gustavo Fuentes	Booked
LF	11	(Honduras) Wilmer Velásquez	(substituted off) 76'
Substitutions:
MF	7	(Honduras) Francis Reyes	(substituted on) 46'
MF	–	(Honduras) Wilson Palacios	(substituted on) 57'
MF	10	(Argentina) Diego de Rosa	(substituted on) 76'
Manager:
(Honduras) Edwin Pavón

GK	1	(Honduras) Víctor Coello	Booked
RB	15	(Honduras) Walter López	(substituted off) 88'
CB	4	(Honduras) Lenín Suárez
CB	5	(Honduras) Darwin Pacheco
LB	6	(Honduras) Nigel Zúniga
RM	7	(Honduras) Emil Martínez
CM	24	(Honduras) Luis Guifarro	(yellow card) 75' (yellow-red card)
LM	19	(Honduras) Mario Berríos
AM	20	(Honduras) Carlos Oliva	(substituted off) 62'
CF	10	(Honduras) Enrique Reneau
CF	9	(Honduras) Elvis Scott	Booked	(substituted off) 75'
Substitutions:
MF	11	(Honduras) Mario López	(substituted on) 62'
FW	17	(Honduras) Pompilio Cacho	(substituted on) 75'
DF	23	(Honduras) Mauricio Sabillón	(substituted on) 88'
Manager:
(Honduras) José Herrera

- Marathón won 4–2 on aggregate.

Liga Nacional
2001–02 Clausura Champion
C.D. Marathón
3rd title

=== Squads ===
Deportes Savio
(Honduras) Wilmer "Superman" Cruz	(Honduras) Clayd Lester Marson	(Honduras) Juan García
(Honduras) Marlon Monge	(Honduras) Marlon Banica	(Honduras) Wilmer Ramos
(Honduras) José Suazo	(Honduras) Delvin Andino	(Honduras) Gerson Norales
(Honduras) Dadson Díaz	(Honduras) Juan Trejo	(Honduras) Carlos Güity
(Honduras) Meilin Soto	(Honduras) Walter "Gualala" Trejo	(Honduras) Glendon Cruz
(Honduras) Marvin Morán	(Honduras) Cristian Rodríguez	(Argentina) Patricio Negreira
Marathón
(Honduras) Jaime Rosales	(Honduras) Mauricio Sabillón	(Honduras) Pompilio Cacho
(Honduras) Emil Martínez	(Honduras) Juan Pablo Centeno	(Argentina) Fernando Regules
(Honduras) Orvin "Pato" Cabrera	(Honduras) Darwin Pacheco	(Honduras) Mario Berríos
(Honduras) Behiker Bustillo	(Honduras) Enrique Reneau	(Honduras) Jimmy González
(Honduras) Óscar Vargas	(Honduras) Dennis Ferrera	(Honduras) Douglas Murillo
(Honduras) Elvis Scott	(Honduras) Luis Guifarro	(Honduras) Camilo Bonilla
(Honduras) Mario López	(Honduras) Lenín Suárez	(Honduras) Nigel Zúniga
(Honduras) Víctor Coello	(Honduras) Leonardo Morales	(Honduras) Carlos Oliva
(Argentina) Ariel Leyes	(Honduras) Walter López
Motagua
(Honduras) Elmer Montoya	(Honduras) Júnior Izaguirre	(Honduras) Mauricio "Pipo" Castro
(Argentina) José Pacini	(Honduras) Noel Valladares	(Honduras) Juan Raudales
(Argentina) Hugo Domínguez	(Honduras) Mario Chirinos	(Honduras) Ricky García
(Honduras) Jorge "Tata" Lozano	(Honduras) César "Nene" Obando	(Honduras) Elmer "Burrito" Mejía
(Honduras) Robel Bernárdez	(Honduras) Marlon Nolasco	(Honduras) Francisco Ramírez
(Honduras) Milton "Jocón" Reyes	(Honduras) Faussy Rodríguez	(Honduras) Ramón Romero
(Honduras) Nimrod Medina	(Honduras) Carlos Paes de Oliveira
Olimpia
(Argentina) Danilo Tosello	(Panama) Donaldo González	(Honduras) Wilmer Velásquez
(Honduras) Donis Escober	(Brazil) Denilson Costa	(Honduras) Mario Beata
(Argentina) Gustavo Fuentes	(Honduras) Hendry Thomas	(Honduras) Gerson Vásquez
(Honduras) Merlyn Membreño	(Honduras) Fabio Ulloa	(Argentina) Diego de Rosa
(Honduras) Limber Pérez	(Honduras) Francis Reyes	(Honduras) Narciso "Kalusha" Fernández
Platense
(Argentina) Diego Fernández	(Honduras) Jorge Zapata	(Honduras) Ángel "Búfalo" Hill
(Honduras) Elmer Zelaya	(Honduras) Reynaldo Tilguath	(Panama) Ricardo James
(Honduras) Anael Figueroa	(Honduras) Clifford Laing	(Panama) José Anthony Torres
(Honduras) Júnior Morales	(Honduras) Pablo Medina	(Brazil) Marcelo Ferreira
Real España
(Honduras) Erick Vallecillo	(Honduras) Marlon José Peña	(Honduras) Milton "Chocolate" Flores
(Honduras) David Cárcamo	(Honduras) Héctor Gutiérrez	(Honduras) Reynaldo Clavasquin
(Honduras) Marco "Maco" Mejía
Real Comayagua
(Honduras) Rudy Williams
Universidad
(Honduras) Héctor Cardona	(Honduras) Marlon Hernández	(Honduras) Mario Herrera
(Honduras) Luis "Bombero" Ramírez
Victoria
(Honduras) Ricardo Gabriel "Gato" Canales	(Honduras) John Bodden	(Honduras) Carlos Lino
(Honduras) Carlos Discua	(Honduras) Ronald "Cuervo" Maradiaga	(Honduras) Mauricio Figueroa
(Honduras) Jorge Pineda	(Honduras) Luis Lagos	(Honduras) Carlos "Tatín" Morán
(Honduras) Miguel "Gallo" Mariano	(Honduras) Reynaldo "Chino" Pineda	(Honduras) Mario Chávez
Vida
(Honduras) Jonathan Bush Sanders	(Honduras) Luis Perdomo	(Honduras) Renán "Chimbo" Aguilera
(Honduras) Jorge Ocampo	(Honduras) Saynor Álvarez	(Honduras) Marvin Brown
(Honduras) Justo Norales

=== Top goalscorers ===
13 goals

- (Brazil) Marcelo Ferreira (Platense)

10 goals

- (Honduras) Wilmer Velásquez (Olimpia)

7 goals

- (Argentina) Gustavo Fuentes (Olimpia)
- (Honduras) Elvis Scott (Marathón)

6 goals

- (Brazil) Denilson Costa (Olimpia)
- (Honduras) Carlos Múñoz (Real Comayagua)

5 goals

- (Honduras) Pompilio Cacho (Marathón)
- (Honduras) Enrique Reneau (Marathón)
- (Honduras) Emil Martínez (Marathón)
- (Honduras) Christian Martínez (Victoria)
- (Argentina) Danilo Tosello (Olimpia)
- (Honduras) Reynaldo Tilguath (Platense)
- (Honduras) Miguel Mariano (Victoria)
- (Honduras) Luis Oseguera (Victoria)

4 goals

- (Honduras) Clifford Laing (Platense)
- (Honduras) Francisco Ramírez (Motagua)

3 goals

- (Honduras) Carlos Oliva (Marathón)
- (Honduras) Jaime Rosales (Marathón)
- (Honduras) Jorge Pineda (Victoria)
- (Honduras) Carlos Güity (Vida)
- (Honduras) Marco Mejía (Real España)

2 goals

- (Honduras) Marlon Hernández (Universidad)
- (Honduras) Lester Marson (Savio)
- (Honduras) Milton Palacios (Victoria)
- (Honduras) Fabio Ulloa (Olimpia)
- (Honduras) Francis Reyes (Olimpia)

1 goal

- (Argentina) Ariel Leyes (Marathón)
- (Honduras) Walter López (Marathón)
- (Honduras) Óscar Vargas (Marathón)
- (Honduras) Nigel Zúniga (Marathón)
- (Honduras) Maynor Figueroa (Victoria)

== Relegation table ==
Pos	Team	Pld	W	D	L	GF	GA	GD	Pts	Qualification or relegation
1	Marathón	36	16	12	8	55	43	+12	60	Qualified to the 2002 Copa Interclubes UNCAF
2	Olimpia	36	15	13	8	56	34	+22	58	
3	Platense	36	16	10	10	51	39	+12	58	
4	Motagua	36	12	15	9	34	29	+5	51	Qualified to the 2002 Copa Interclubes UNCAF
5	Victoria	36	11	16	9	47	47	0	49	
6	Real España	36	10	17	9	37	30	+7	47	
7	Vida	36	6	21	9	36	44	−8	39	
8	Universidad	36	8	14	14	33	49	−16	38	
9	Real Comayagua	36	7	14	15	42	57	−15	35	
10	Deportes Savio	36	7	12	17	38	57	−19	33	Relegated to the 2002–03 Liga de Ascenso

Updated to match(es) played on 12 May 2002. Source:
