= Clásico Nacional Hondureño =

El Clásico Nacional ("National Classic") is a Honduran football match played between Olimpia and Marathón. The Classic began in September 1928 when Olimpia, at that time Central Zone champion, won its three match final series against Marathón, champion of the North. This event created the fierce Clásico Nacional.

== Head to head ==
Pos	Team	Pld	W	D	L	GF	GA	GD	Pts
1	Olimpia	246	114	67	65	324	221	+103	295
2	Marathón	246	65	67	114	221	324	−103	197

Updated to match(es) played on 12 December 2020. Source:

== The Finals ==
Olimpia and Marathón have played 9 finals. Six won by Olimpia and 3 won by Marathón.

== 1987-88 Honduran Liga Nacional ==
1987-12-20

Olimpia	0 – 0	Marathón

Tegucigalpa

1987-12-23

Marathón	0 – 1	Olimpia
		Espinoza

San Pedro Sula
- Olimpia won 1–0 on aggregate.

== 2001-02 Clausura ==
23 May 2002
19:30 (UTC−06:00)

Marathón	4 – 1	Olimpia
Zúniga 44' (pen.); Renau 49' 52'; Vargas 85'		Tosello 60'

Estadio Olímpico Metropolitano
San Pedro Sula
Attendance: 29,000
Referee: Oscar Bardales

26 May 2002
16:00 (UTC−06:00)

Olimpia	1 – 0	Marathón
Fuentes 7'

Estadio Tiburcio Carías Andino
Tegucigalpa
Attendance: 15,187
Referee: Argelio Sabillón
- Marathón won 4-2 on aggregate.
