= Fernando Regulés =

Argentine footballer

Personal information
- Full name: Fernando Gabriel Regulés
- Date of birth: 17 October 1973 (age 53)
- Place of birth: Buenos Aires, Argentina
- Position: Goalkeeper

Youth career
- San Lorenzo

Senior career*
Years	Team	Apps	(Gls)
1990–1992	San Lorenzo	1	(0)
1993–1994	Independiente	0	(0)
1994–1995	Douglas Haig	5	(0)
1995–1996	Chacarita Juniors	0	(0)
1996–1997	Temperley	30	(0)
1997–1998	Santiago Wanderers	23	(0)
1999	Aucas	19	(0)
2000	Sportivo Luqueño		
2000–2001	Marathón		
2001	Real Comayagua		
2002–2003	Juventud Alianza	3	(0)
2004	Colegiales	7	(0)
2005	Atlético Candelaria	12	(0)
2005–2008	Guaraní Antonio Franco	71	(0)
2012–2013	Deportivo Camioneros		

International career
1991	Argentina U20		

Managerial career
- Deportivo Camioneros (gk coach)
- Deportivo Cuenca (gk coach)
- * Club domestic league appearances and goals

Fernando Gabriel Regulés (born 17 October 1973) is an Argentine former professional footballer who played as a goalkeeper for clubs in Argentina, Chile, Ecuador, Paraguay and Honduras.

== Teams ==
=== Player ===
- (Argentina) San Lorenzo 1990–1992
- (Argentina) Independiente 1993–1994
- (Argentina) Douglas Haig 1994–1995
- (Argentina) Chacarita Juniors 1995–1996
- (Argentina) Temperley 1996–1997
- (Chile) Santiago Wanderers 1997–1998
- (Ecuador) Aucas 1999
- (Paraguay) Sportivo Luqueño 2000
- (Honduras) Marathón 2000–2001
- (Honduras) Real Comayagua 2001
- (Argentina) Juventud Alianza 2002–2003
- (Argentina) Colegiales 2004
- (Argentina) Atlético Candelaria 2005
- (Argentina) Guaraní Antonio Franco 2005–2008
- (Argentina) Deportivo Camioneros 2012–2013

=== Goalkeeping coach ===
- (Argentina) Deportivo Camioneros
- (Ecuador) Deportivo Cuenca
