= 2000–01 Honduran Segunda División =

Honduran Segunda División
- Season: 2000–01
- Champions: Real Maya
- Promoted: Real Maya
- All statistics correct as of 29 April 2001.

The 2000–01 Honduran Segunda División was the 34th season of the Honduran Segunda División. Under the management of Oswaldo Altamirano, Real Maya won the tournament after defeating Comayagua F.C. in the final series and obtained promotion to the 2001–02 Honduran Liga Nacional.

== Postseason ==
=== Octagonal ===
1st leg	Comayagua	2–1	Palestino

2nd leg	Palestino	2-1 (4-5)	Comayagua

- Comayagua won 2–1 on aggregated.

1st leg	Social Sol	1–1	Atlético Independiente

2nd leg	Atlético Independiente	2–0	Social Sol

- Atlético Independiente won 3–1 on aggregated.

1st leg	Ingenio Villanueva	0–1	Real Maya

2nd leg	Real Maya	1–0	Ingenio Villanueva

- Real Maya won 2–0 on aggregated.

1st leg	Olimpia B	1–1	Real Sociedad

2nd leg	Real Sociedad	1–1 (10-11)	Olimpia B

- Real Sociedad 2–2 Olimpia B on aggregated. Real Sociedad won on penalty shoot-outs.

=== Semifinals ===
1st leg	Atlético Independiente	0–1	Comayagua

2nd leg	Comayagua	1–1	Atlético Independiente

- Comayagua won 2–1 on aggregated.

1st leg	Real Sociedad	3–4	Real Maya

2nd leg	Real Maya	3–1	Real Sociedad

- Real Maya won 7–4 on aggregated.

=== Final ===
24 April 2001 1st leg	Real Maya	1-1	Comayagua
	59'		79'

29 April 2001 2nd leg	Comayagua	2-3	Real Maya	Comayagua, Comayagua
	Goal		Goal

- Real Maya won 3–2 on aggregated.
