= Nigel Zúniga =

Honduran footballer

Personal information
- Full name: Nigel Alberto Zúniga Hontar
- Date of birth: 9 June 1971 (age 55)
- Place of birth: Tela, Honduras
- Position: Defender

Senior career*
Years	Team	Apps	(Gls)
1989–1992	Platense		
1992–1994	Petrotela		
1995–1997	Vida		
1997–1998	Motagua		
1998–1999	Real Maya		
1999–2000	Real España		
2000–2002	Marathón	89	(9)
2002–2003	Real España		

International career
1996–2000	Honduras	5	(0)
- * Club domestic league appearances and goals

Nigel Alberto Zúniga Hontar (born 9 June 1972) is a Honduran former footballer who played as a defender.

== Club career ==
Known by his powerful left foot and excellent defensive and offensive work, Zúniga has excelled in his career in the Honduran football. He started his career in Platense F.C., moving to C.D. Petrotela, C.D.S. Vida, F.C. Motagua, Real Maya, Real C.D. España and C.D. Marathón.

He managed to be champion with Motagua (1997–98 Apertura) and Marathón (2001–02 Clausura).

== International career ==
Zúniga made his debut for Honduras in a March 1996 friendly match and has earned a total of five caps, scoring no goals. He has represented his country at the 1998 CONCACAF Gold Cup.

His final international was a May 2000 friendly match against Canada.

== Retirement ==
Now, Zúniga serves as pastor of churches and coach children's soccer teams.
