= C.D. Real Comayagua =

Honduran football club

Real Comayagua
- Full name: Club Deportivo Real Comayagua
- Ground: Estadio Municipal, Comayagua, Honduras
- Capacity: 8,000
Home colours	Away colours	Third colours

Club Deportivo Real Comayagua was a Honduran football club based in Comayagua, Honduras.

== History ==
Real Maya bought Real Comayagua's franchise for the 2002–03 season.

== Achievements ==
- Segunda División

Runners-up (1): 2000–01

== League performance ==
Regular season									Post season							
Season	Pos.	G	W	D	L	F:A	PTS	+/-	Pos.	G	W	D	L	F:A	PTS	+/-
2001–02 A	8th	18	3	10	5	22:27	19	-5	Didn't enter							
2001–02 C	10th	18	4	4	10	20:30	16	-10	Didn't enter							

== All-time record vs. opponents ==
- As of 2001–02 Clausura

Opponent	G	W	D	L	F	A	PTS	+/-
Deportes Savio	4	2	2	0	9	3	8	+6
Platense	4	2	1	1	6	5	7	+1
Vida	4	1	2	1	6	6	5	0
Real España	4	1	2	1	4	5	5	-1
Motagua	4	1	1	2	3	5	4	-2
Victoria	4	0	3	1	4	6	3	-2
Marathón	4	0	1	3	3	7	1	-4
Universidad	4	0	1	3	3	9	1	-6
Olimpia	4	0	1	3	4	11	1	-7
