= Honduras Salzburg =

Association football club in Honduras

- Full name: Honduras Salzburg
- Nickname: Los Austriacos (The Austrians)
- Ground: Estadio Humberto Micheleti, El Progreso, Honduras
- Capacity: 5,000
Home colours	Away colours

Honduras Salzburg was a Honduran football club based on El Progreso, Honduras.

== History ==
They have only had two seasons in the Liga Nacional de Fútbol Profesional de Honduras. Honduras Salzburg withdrew for 2003–04 Apertura, selling their franchise to Victoria, which had been relegated in 2002–03 Clausura and were thereby allowed to stay up.

== Achievements ==
- Segunda División

Winners (1): 2001–02

== League performance ==
Regular season									Post season							
Season	Pos.	G	W	D	L	F:A	PTS	+/-	Pos.	G	W	D	L	F:A	PTS	+/-
2002–03 A	8th	18	3	9	6	19:22	18	-3	Didn't enter							
2002–03 C	10th	18	2	6	10	12:27	12	-15	Didn't enter							

== All-time record vs. opponents ==
- As of 2002–03 Clausura

Opponent	G	W	D	L	F	A	PTS	+/-
Marathón	4	2	1	1	3	3	7	0
Real Maya / Real Patepluma	4	1	2	1	3	3	5	0
Vida	4	1	1	2	5	6	4	-1
Real España	4	1	1	2	2	6	4	-4
Platense	4	0	3	1	5	6	3	-1
Universidad	4	0	3	1	3	5	3	-2
Olimpia	4	0	2	2	3	5	2	-2
Victoria	4	0	2	2	3	6	2	-3
Motagua	4	0	0	4	4	9	0	-5
