= Edgardo Simovic =

Uruguayan footballer (born 1975)

Personal information
- Full name: Edgardo Damián Simovic Ramses
- Date of birth: 8 February 1975 (age 51)
- Place of birth: Montevideo, Uruguay
- Height: 1.88 m (6 ft 2 in)
- Position: Striker

Senior career*
Years	Team	Apps	(Gls)
1994–1996	Liverpool Montevideo		
1996	Marítimo		
1997	Liverpool Montevideo		
1998	Tigrillos		
1999–2002	Liverpool Montevideo		
2002–2003	Miramar Misiones		
2004–2005	Marathón	72	(28)
2006	Olimpia Asunción		
2006	Nueva Chicago	2	(0)
2007	Zob Ahan	1	(0)
2007	Aucas		
2008	Vihren Sandanski	12	(3)
2009	Sport Áncash		
2010	Deportivo Maldonado		
2010	Glória (loan)		
- * Club domestic league appearances and goals

Edgardo Damián Simovic Ramses (born 8 February 1975) is a Uruguayan former professional footballer who played as a forward.

== Club career ==
He started his career at Uruguayan side Liverpool FC (Montevideo) in 1994, and was loaned to Portugal Marítimo in 1996.

He also played in Argentina, Ecuador, Paraguay, Honduras, Mexico, Iran and Bulgaria.
