= Mario Berríos (Honduran footballer) =

Honduran footballer (born 1982)

Personal information
- Full name: Mario René Berríos Castillo
- Date of birth: May 29, 1982 (age 44)
- Place of birth: Tela, Honduras
- Height: 1.63 m (5 ft 4 in)
- Position: Midfielder

Team information
- Current team: Marathón
- Number: 19

Senior career*
Years	Team	Apps	(Gls)
2000–2017	Marathón	474	(40)

International career^{‡}
2002–2013	Honduras	19	(0)
- * Club domestic league appearances and goals as of 2005 ‡ National team caps and goals as of 2006

Mario René Berríos Castillo (born May 29, 1982) is a Honduran former football midfielder that only played for Marathón in Liga Nacional de Honduras.

== Club career ==
A one-club man, the left-sided Berríos has played his entire professional career for Marathón. He made his first apparition for Marathón at the 2000–01 Clausura, when José de la Paz Herrera was the coach of the team.

He is also captain of the team. On August 8, 2015, during the 2015–16 Apertura, Berríos received a special recognition from Marathón, for he got to play 400 games with the team. Berríos scored 40 goals for Marathón during his 17 years in the team. On November 18, 2017, after 17 years spending with Marathón, and 470 appearances, he announced his retirement.

== International career ==
Berrios made his debut for Honduras in a November 2002 friendly match against Colombia and has earned a total of 13 caps, scoring no goals. He has represented his country at the 2005 UNCAF Nations Cup as well as at the 2005 CONCACAF Gold Cup. and the 2013 CONCACAF Gold Cup.

== Honours and awards ==
=== Club ===
C.D. Marathón

- Liga Profesional de Honduras: 2001–02 C, 2002–03 C, 2004–05 A, 2007–08 A, 2008–09 A, 2009–10 A
- Honduran Cup: 2017
