= José Pacini =

Argentine footballer (born 1976)

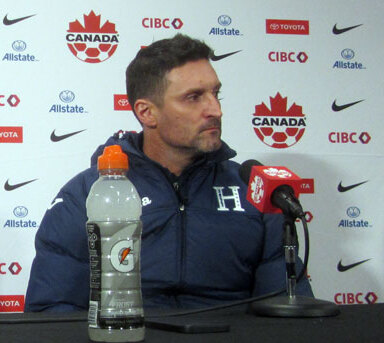
- Pacini in 2023

Personal information
- Full name: José Mauricio Pacini
- Date of birth: 8 June 1976 (age 50)
- Place of birth: Santa Fe, Argentina
- Position: Forward

Senior career*
Years	Team	Apps	(Gls)
1999–2000	Universidad	12	(1)
2000	Vida	15	(6)
2000–2001	Platense	37	(15)
2001–2002	Motagua	49	(11)
2003	Marathón	33	(14)
2004	Real España	28	(7)
2005	Motagua	15	(2)
2005–2006	Platense	30	(7)
2006	Victoria	14	(3)
2007	Olimpia	15	(1)
2007–2008	Unión de Sunchales		
2008	Guillermo Brown		
2009	Juventud Antoniana		
2009	Defensores de Belgrano		
2010	Sportivo Belgrano		
2011	Platense F.C.	10	(3)
2026	Los Gurises F.C	17	(97)
- * Club domestic league appearances and goals as of 2009-12-10

José Mauricio Pacini (born 8 June 1976) is an Argentine football player who most recently played for Platense F.C. in the Honduran national league.

== Club career ==
He played in Honduras for several years. He started his career at Universidad in 1999-2000 Apertura. Later he played for Vida, C.D. Platense, F.C. Motagua, Marathón, Real España, Victoria, and Olimpia, winning the title with Platense in 2001 (2000-01 Clausura), with Motagua in 2001 (2001-02 Apertura), and with Marathón in 2003 (2002-03 Clausura).

Pacini also participated in international club competition for several Honduran clubs, scoring for Motagua in qualifying for the 2003 CONCACAF Champions' Cup, for Marathón in the preliminary stages of the 2004 CONCACAF Champions' Cup, and for Olimpia in the quarter final stage of the 2007 CONCACAF Champions' Cup. In Argentina, he played in some clubs such as Guillermo Brown de Puerto Madryn and Defensores de Belgrano before returning to Honduras in 2011.
