= Enrique Reneau =

Honduran footballer (1971-2015)

Personal information
- Full name: Germán Enrique Centeno Reneau
- Date of birth: 9 April 1971
- Place of birth: Jutiapa, Honduras
- Date of death: 23 August 2015 (aged 44)
- Place of death: La Ceiba, Honduras
- Height: 1.74 m (5 ft 9 in)
- Positions: Attacking midfielder; forward

Senior career*
Years	Team	Apps	(Gls)
1989–1996	Victoria	121	(33)
1992–1993	→ Cojutepeque (loan)		
1996	Sipesa		
1996	Luis Ángel Firpo		
1997	Cruz Azul Hidalgo		
1997–1998	Marathón	20	(2)
1999	Olimpia	22	(2)
2000	Victoria	31	(4)
2001	Zacapa		
2001–2002	Marathón	37	(13)
2002–2004	Real España	46	(3)
2004	Vida	14	(2)
2005	Chalatenango		
2006	Mictlán		

International career
1996–1997	Honduras	16	(5)
- * Club domestic league appearances and goals as of 2009-12-10

Germán Enrique Centeno Reneau, known as "Quique" Renau (9 April 1971 – 23 August 2015) was a Honduran football player.

== Club career ==
A lightning fast striker and nicknamed El Esquilete (the Stilletto) or La Gacela (the Gazelle), Reneau started his career at Victoria where he debuted in 1989. He went on to score 37 goals with Victoria between 1990 and 1996, as well in 2000. At Victoria he was an important member of their first league title-winning team in 1995 when scoring the goal that won them the championship against Olimpia in Tegucigalpa.

Later he played for Marathón, Olimpia, Real España and Vida, winning the 1999 Apertura with Olimpia and the 2002 Clausura with Marathón. From 1990 to 2004, Reneau scored 59 goals in total in the Liga Nacional. In the 2001 Apertura he was the league's top goalscorer with 8 goals. He was never sent off in his career.

=== Spells abroad ===
He also had a stint in Peru with Sipesa and in El Salvador with Cojutepeque and Luis Ángel Firpo whom he left for Mexican side Cruz Azul Hidalgo. He returned to El Salvador in August 2005 to play for Chalatenango.

He finished his career at Guatemalan side Mictlán with whom he won promotion to the Guatemalan top tier in summer 2006.

== International career ==
Reneau made his debut for Honduras in a January 1996 CONCACAF Gold Cup match against Brazil and has earned a total of 16 caps, scoring 5 goals. He has represented his country in 5 FIFA World Cup qualification matches and played at the 1997 UNCAF Nations Cup, as well as at the 1996 CONCACAF Gold Cup.

His final international was an April 1997 UNCAF Nations Cup match against Panama.

=== International goals ===
Scores and results list Honduras' goal tally first.

N.	Date	Venue	Opponent	Score	Result	Competition
1.	25 August 1996	Estadio Tiburcio Carias Andino, Tegucigalpa, Honduras	Cuba	2–0	4-0	Friendly match
2.	25 August 1996	Estadio Tiburcio Carias Andino, Tegucigalpa, Honduras	Cuba	4–0	4-0	Friendly match
3.	1 November 1996	Shea Stadium, New York, United States	Colombia	1–0	1-2	Friendly match
4.	6 November 1996	Estadio Azteca, Mexico City, Mexico	Mexico	1–3	1–3	1998 FIFA World Cup qualification
5.	17 November 1996	Estadio Francisco Morazán, San Pedro Sula, Honduras	Saint Vincent and the Grenadines	6–1	11–3	1998 FIFA World Cup qualification

== Retirement, personal life and death ==
His parents were Óscar Centeno and María Carolina Reneau. He met his Salvadoran girlfriend Brenda Ramírez in 1996, when he played for Firpo. Reneau has three children: Melissa, Karen and Enrique. After retiring in 2006 he moved to New Orleans and then Miami in the United States where he painted buildings.

In July 2013, Reneau was diagnosed with motor neurone disease. He subsequently lost his job in the US and returned to Honduras in December 2013. He died on 23 August 2015 in a La Ceiba's Vicente Dantoni hospital due to respiratory failure.

== Honours and awards ==
Olimpia

- Liga Profesional de Honduras: 1998–99

Victoria

- Liga Profesional de Honduras: 1994–95

Marathón

- Liga Profesional de Honduras: 2001–02 C

Real España

- Liga Profesional de Honduras: 2003–04 A
