= Marcelo Ferreira (footballer) =

Honduran footballer (born 1975)

Personal information
- Full name: Marcelo Ferreira Martins
- Date of birth: 7 November 1975 (age 50)
- Place of birth: Brazil
- Position: Forward

Senior career*
| Years | Team | Apps | (Gls) |
| 1999–2000 | Broncos UNAH | | |
| 2000–2001 | Olimpia | | |
| 2002 | Platense | 40 | (28) |
| 2003–2005 | Olimpia | | |
| 2005–2006 | Motagua | | |
| 2006–2007 | Atlético Olanchano | | |
| 2007–2008 | Marathón | 11 | (2) |
| 2008–2009 | Platense | 14 | (2) |
| 2009–2010 | Real Juventud | 22 | (2) |
| 2010–2011 | Parrillas One | | |
| 2012 | Cobán Imperial | | |

International career
| 2003–2004 | Honduras | 5 | (0) |
- * Club domestic league appearances and goals

Marcelo Ferreira Martins (born 7 November 1975) is a Brazilian and naturalized Honduran former footballer who played as a forward.

He is the tenth all-time top scorer in the Honduran Liga Nacional with a total of 94 goals. Now he lives in Honduras. Ferreira along with Denilson Costa and Justin Arboleda are among the only naturalized Honduran nationals to have played for the Honduras national team.

== Club career ==
Ferreira was born in Brazil. He came to Honduras in 1997, by recommendation of José de la Paz Herrera. His first team was Broncos UNAH in 1999. His brilliant performance in Broncos made him go to Olimpia. In the 2001–02 Clausura, he was transferred to Platense. During his two tournaments in Platense, Ferreira scored a total of 28 goals. He went back in 2003 to Olimpia. After two years, he was contracted by F.C. Motagua for the 2005–06 Apertura. He scored eight goals for Motagua during the two tournaments. After Motagua, Ferreira went to Atlético Olanchano for the 2006–07 season. Ferreira scored 11 goals during the season. In the 2007–08 Apertura, C.D. Marathón signed Ferreira. He scored goals. He then moved to Platense, six years after his first spell at this team. He scored two goals. For 2009 he signed for Parrillas One in the Liga de Ascenso de Honduras.
