= Dennis Ferrera =

Honduran footballer (born 1980)

Personal information
- Full name: Dennis Gustavo Ferrera
- Date of birth: December 3, 1980 (age 45)
- Place of birth: San Pedro Sula, Honduras
- Height: 1.78 m (5 ft 10 in)
- Position: Midfielder

Senior career*
Years	Team	Apps	(Gls)
2000–2008	Marathón	141	(7)
2009	Platense	4	(0)
2009	Savio	10	(0)

International career^{‡}
2005–2007	Honduras	9	(0)
- * Club domestic league appearances and goals ‡ National team caps and goals as of January 5, 2013

Dennis Gustavo Ferrera (born December 3, 1980) is a retired Honduran football midfielder.

== Club career ==
A holding midfielder, Ferrera started and played the majority of his career at hometown club Marathón in Liga Nacional de Honduras. He played 141 games for them and won two league titles.

Before the start of the 2009 Clausura, he left them for Platense but his contract was soon cancelled after revealing that he had used a banned substance. The result of the test that was carried out however turned out to be negative but his contract was not reinstated.

He joined Savio the next season.

Team	Season	Games	Start	Sub	Goal	YC	RC
C.D. Marathón	2008-09 A	5	4	1	0	2	1

== International career ==
Ferrera made his debut for Honduras in a February 2005 UNCAF Nations Cup match against Nicaragua and has earned a total of 9 caps, scoring no goals. He has represented his country at the 2005 and 2007 UNCAF Nations Cups.

His final international was a February 2007 UNCAF Nations Cup match against Panama.
