= Pompilio Cacho =

Honduran footballer (born 1976)

Personal information
- Full name: Pompilio Cacho Valerio
- Date of birth: 22 December 1976 (age 49)
- Place of birth: Tela, Honduras
- Height: 1.80 m (5 ft 11 in)
- Positions: Striker; second striker

Youth career
- 1985–1989: El Sauce
- 1989–1995: Marathón

Senior career*
Years	Team	Apps	(Gls)
1995–2003	Marathón	165	(45)
2003–2004	Motagua	47	(12)
2004–2006	Marathón	39	(11)
2006	Vida		(1)
2007	Marquense		
2007	Deportes Savio	12	(0)
2008	Vista Hermosa	34	(13)
2009	Luis Ángel Firpo	17	(4)
2009	Real Juventud	14	(5)
2010	Peñarol La Mesilla	19	(6)
2010	Hispano		(4)
2011	Vida	17	(4)
2011–2012	Vista Hermosa	14	(4)

International career
2003–2004	Honduras	5	(0)
- * Club domestic league appearances and goals

Pompilio Cacho Valerio (born 22 December 1976) is a former Honduran football player who plays as forward.

== Club career ==
A much-travelled striker, Cacho started his career at Marathón, making his debut on 2 December 1995 against Broncos, and then played for several clubs in Honduras, Guatemala and El Salvador. In Marathón, he is known as a legendary player for the club, scoring 56 goals during the 10 years he stayed with the team. His debut with Marathón was on December 2, 1995, in a 0–0 tie against Universidad in San Pedro Sula. With Marathón he won two league titles: 2001-02 Clausura and 2002-03 Clausura. In Summer 2009 he returned to Honduras after a few years abroad to play for Real Juventud. In December 2010, Pompigol rejoined Vida for 6 months. In January 2012 he returned to El Salvador to have a second spell with Vista Hermosa but that season ended in tears as Vista Hermosa was relegated.

== International career ==
He made his debut for Honduras in a February 2003 UNCAF Nations Cup match against Costa Rica and has earned a total of 5 caps, scoring no goals. He has represented his country at the 2003 UNCAF Nations Cup.

His final international was a January 2004 friendly match against Norway.

== Career statistic ==
Last update: 26 May 2013

Season	Team	Country	Division	Apps	Goles
1995/96	C.D. Marathón	Honduras	1	2	0
1996/97	C.D. Marathón	Honduras	1	5	1
1997/98	C.D. Marathón	Honduras	1	8	0
1998/99	C.D. Marathón	Honduras	1	8	0
1999/00	C.D. Marathón	Honduras	1	19	1
2000/01	C.D. Marathón	Honduras	1	39	17
2001/02	C.D. Marathón	Honduras	1	37	11
2002/03	C.D. Marathón	Honduras	1	37	15
2003/04	Motagua	Honduras	1	32	9
2004/05	Motagua	Honduras	1	15	3
2005	C.D. Marathón	Honduras	1	10	2
2005/06	C.D. Marathón	Honduras	1	29	9
2006	C.D.S. Vida	Honduras	1		
2007	Marquense	Guatemala	1		
2007	Deportes Savio	Honduras	1	12	0
2008	Vista Hermosa	El Salvador	1	34	13
2009	Luis Ángel Firpo	El Salvador	1	17	4
2009	Real Juventud	Honduras	1	14	5
2010	Peñarol La Mesilla	Guatemala	1	19	6
2010	Hispano	Honduras	1	16	4
2011	Vida	Honduras	1	19	4
2012	Vista Hermosa	El Salvador	1	14	4
