= Fabio Ulloa =

Honduran footballer (born 1976)

Personal information
- Full name: Fabio Renán Ulloa Castillo
- Date of birth: 20 August 1976 (age 50)
- Place of birth: Tela, Honduras
- Height: 1.81 m (5 ft 11 1/2 in)
- Position: Centre back

Senior career*
Years	Team	Apps	(Gls)
1994–2005	Olimpia		
2005	Victoria		
2005–2006	Águila		
2006	Motagua	0	(0)
2007–2009	Águila	21	(2)
2009–2010	Real Juventud	40	(3)
2010–2011	Necaxa	15	(1)
2012	Deportes Savio		

International career
1995	Honduras U20		
1994–2006	Honduras	10	(0)
- * Club domestic league appearances and goals

Fabio Renán Ulloa Castillo (born 20 August 1976) is a Honduran footballer.

== Club career ==
Ulloa has played professionally for Olimpia, and has won seven national championships.

=== Águila ===
He has won a Salvadoran Clausura championship with C.D. Águila in 2006, after joining them in summer 2005. After a year he looked to leave them for Marathón but ended up with F.C. Motagua. He however returned to Aguila within a month.

He joined Real Juventud before the 2009 Clausura.

=== C.D. Necaxa ===
On 8 August 2010, Ulloa made his debut in the Liga Nacional de Futbol de Honduras with C.D. Necaxa against F.C. Motagua in a 3–0 win, and scored his first goal on 24 October 2010 against Deportes Savio in a 1–2 defeat. He left them for Savio in 2012.

== International career ==
Ulloa played for Honduras at the 1995 FIFA World Youth Championship in the United Arab Emirates, where he was sent off against Portugal.

He made his senior debut for Honduras in a May 1994 Miami Cup against El Salvador and has earned a total of 10 caps, scoring no goals. He has represented his country at the 1997 UNCAF Nations Cup.

His final international was an August 2006 friendly match against Venezuela.

== Personal life ==
Ulloa married his school sweetheart, Ivis Estela Parham with whom he has a son named Favio Ulloa Jr. Years later he remarried, Honduran TV host, Helena Alvarez with whom he has a son named Sebastian Ulloa Alvarez. He remarried for the third time and has a younger daughter. He currently lives in Santa Ana, California.

In 2001, he was jailed after being accused of raping a young woman in his apartment. He was only released after 6 days after charges against him were dropped.
