= Clifford Laing =

Honduran footballer (born 1982)

Personal information
- Full name: Clifford Altamirano Laing
- Date of birth: 20 September 1982 (age 44)
- Place of birth: Honduras
- Positions: Attacking midfielder; winger

Youth career
- 1993–1999: Platense Júnior

Senior career*
Years	Team	Apps	(Gls)
2000–2003	Platense	82	(20)
2004–2006	Real España	59	(8)
2006	Danubio	1	(0)
2006	Marathón	7	(0)
2007–2008	Vida	33	(2)
2009–2010	Social Sol	29	(4)
2010	Platense	5	(0)
2011–2012	Villanueva	21	(3)
2012–2013	Honduras El Progreso	18	(1)

International career^{‡}
2003–2004	Honduras	3	(0)
- * Club domestic league appearances and goals as of 13 December 2013 ‡ National team caps and goals as of 13 December 2013

Clifford Altamirano Laing, nicknamed La Agujita (the Little Needle), (born 20 September 1982) is a Honduran football midfielder or forward.

== Club career ==
Laing started his career at Platense, showing a great performance. In 2004, Real España purchase him. He went on a trial for Danubio in Uruguay, but failed to stay. He had a short spell at C.D. Marathón, before going to Vida, Social Sol, Platense, and Villanueva. He last played for Honduras El Progreso in Liga de Ascenso.
