= Víctor Coello =

Honduran footballer (born 1974)

Personal information
- Full name: Víctor Arturo Coello Paz
- Date of birth: 29 July 1974 (age 52)
- Place of birth: Villanueva, Honduras
- Height: 1.80 m (5 ft 11 in)
- Position: Goalkeeper

Team information
- Current team: Juticalpa

Senior career*
Years	Team	Apps	(Gls)
1993–1996	Marathón	17	(0)
1996–2001	Platense	91	(0)
2002–2009	Marathón	188	(0)
2009–2010	Deportes Savio	21	(0)
2010–2012	Platense		
2013–2014	Juticalpa		

International career
1997–2007	Honduras	33	(0)
- * Club domestic league appearances and goals as of 21:54, 23 January 2011 (UTC)

Víctor Arturo Coello Paz (born 29 July 1974) is a Honduran former footballer who played as goalkeeper.

== Club career ==
On 22 December 1993, Coello made his domestic league debut with Marathón in a 1-1- draw against Deportes Progreseño. In summer 2009 he moved to Deportes Savio. He joined Platense before the 2010 Apertura championship.

In January 2013, Coello signed a six-month deal with second division side Juticalpa in their bid to win promotion to the top tier.

== International career ==
Coello made his debut for Honduras in an April 1997 UNCAF Nations Cup match against Panama and has earned a total of 33 caps, scoring no goals. He has represented his country in 1 FIFA World Cup qualification match and played at the 1997, 2003, 2005 and 2007 UNCAF Nations Cups as well as at the 2003 and 2005 CONCACAF Gold Cups.

His final international was a February 2007 UNCAF Nations Cup match against Panama.

== Personal life ==
He is married to Marlene and the couple have a daughter, Abigail. He hopes to retire from football at age 40.

== Honours ==
=== Player ===
C.D. Marathón

- Liga Profesional de Honduras: 2001–02 C, 2002–03 C, 2004–05 A, 2007–08 A, 2008–09 A

Platense F.C.

- Liga Profesional de Honduras: 2000–01 C
