= Walter López (footballer, born 1977) =

Honduran footballer

Personal information
- Full name: Walter Nahún López Cardenas
- Date of birth: 1 September 1977
- Place of birth: La Labor, Honduras
- Date of death: 9 August 2015 (aged 37)
- Place of death: La Democracia municipality, Guatemala
- Height: 1.76 m (5 ft 9 in)
- Position: Wingback

Senior career*
Years	Team	Apps	(Gls)
1997–1999	Platense		
1999–2001	BSV Bad Bleiberg	28	(0)
2001–2002	Austria Salzburg	6	(0)
2002–2004	Marathón	76	(5)
2004–2007	Olimpia		
2007–2008	Motagua	12	(1)
2008–2009	Platense	8	(0)
2009	Deportes Savio	9	(0)
2009–2010	Peñarol La Mesilla	21	(3)
2012	Cobán Imperial		

International career
1999–2000	Honduras U23		
2000–2005	Honduras	13	(1)
- * Club domestic league appearances and goals

Walter Nahún López Cárdenas (1 September 1977 – 9 August 2015) was a Honduran football player.

== Club career ==
His first game in the Honduran league was on 16 November 1997 wearing the Platense shirt in La Ceiba against Vida. With Darwin Pacheco, he has been the only Honduran national league footballer from Ocotepeque Department.

He finished his career with Cobán Imperial in the Guatemala's top division.

== International career ==
López made his debut for Honduras in a May 2000 friendly match against Canada and has earned a total of 13 caps, scoring 1 goal. He has represented his country in 1 FIFA World Cup qualification match and played at the 2005 UNCAF Nations Cup as well as at the 2000 Summer Olympics.

His final international was a June 2005 friendly match against Jamaica.

=== International goals ===
Scores and results list Honduras' goal tally first.

N.	Date	Venue	Opponent	Score	Result	Competition
1.	10 March 2004	Estadio José Pachencho Romero, Maracaibo, Venezuela	Venezuela	1–1	1–2	Friendly match

== Personal life and murder ==
Nicknamed el General, his mother was Ovidia Cárdenas and he had a brother, Fernando.

López was murdered on 9 August 2015 by gangs at a Guatemalan border with Mexico. Police later stated he was shot outside the Estadio Comunal stadium in La Mesilla, La Democracia municipality, in Guatemala when visiting relatives of his wife Lesly Yamileth. He died moments later at the health center of the municipality.
