= Emil Martínez =

Honduran footballer (born 1982)

Personal information
- Full name: Emil José Martínez Cruz
- Date of birth: 17 September 1982 (age 44)
- Place of birth: El Progreso, Honduras
- Height: 1.71 m (5 ft 7 1/2 in)
- Position: Attacking midfielder

Senior career*
Years	Team	Apps	(Gls)
2001–2005	Marathón	105	(30)
2005–2006	Alajuelense	24	(4)
2006–2008	Marathón	47	(23)
2008	Shanghai Shenhua	28	(8)
2009	Marathón	7	(1)
2009	Beijing Guoan	29	(5)
2010	Indios	16	(1)
2010	Hangzhou Greentown	17	(1)
2011	Marathón	16	(4)
2012	Hunan Billows	24	(8)
2013	Marathón	9	(4)
2013	Hunan Billows	14	(1)
2014–2017	Marathón	18	(4)

International career^{‡}
2008	Honduras Olympic team	3	(0)
2002–2011	Honduras	66	(3)
Medal record
Honduras
Third place	UNCAF Nations Cup	2009
- * Club domestic league appearances and goals as of 17 July 2021 ‡ National team caps and goals as of 17 July 2021

Emil José Martínez Cruz (Latin American Spanish: [eˈmil maɾˈtines]; (born 17 September 1982) is a Honduran former professional footballer who played as a midfielder.

== Club career ==
Martínez made his professional debut for Marathón and played abroad for Alajuelense in the Primera División de Costa Rica and Primera División de México side Indios. Also, he was attached to several clubs in Chinese Super League, including Shanghai Shenhua, Beijing Guoan and Hangzhou Greentown. In January 2012 he joined Hunan Billows. In January 2013, he returned to Marathón along with fellow Hunan player Astor Henríquez.

Martínez finished top scorer and best player on the 07-08 Apertura season while playing for Marathón.

=== Club career stats ===
Last update: 6 November 2013

Season	Team	Country	Division	Apps	Goals
2001–02	C.D. Marathón	Honduras	1	28	7
2002–03	C.D. Marathón	Honduras	1	30	8
2003–04	C.D. Marathón	Honduras	1	29	10
2004–05	C.D. Marathón	Honduras	1	18	5
2005–06	L.D. Alajuelense	Costa Rica	1	24	4
2006–07	C.D. Marathón	Honduras	1	28	12
2007–08	C.D. Marathón	Honduras	1	19	11
2008	Shanghai Shenhua	China	1	27	9
2008–09	C.D. Marathón	Honduras	1	7	1
2009	Beijing Guoan	China	1	29	5
2010	Indios	Mexico	1	16	1
2010	Hangzhou Greentown	China	1	17	1
2010–11	C.D. Marathón	Honduras	1	10	4
2011–12	C.D. Marathón	Honduras	1	6	0
2012	Hunan Billows	China	2	24	8
2012–2013	C.D. Marathón	Honduras	1	9	4
2013	Hunan Billows	China	2	14	1

== International career ==
Martínez made his debut for Honduras in a February 2002 Carlsberg Cup match against Slovenia and has earned a total of 66 caps, scoring 3 goals. He has represented his country in 5 FIFA World Cup qualification matches and played at the 2008 Summer Olympics and at the 2003, 2007, 2009 and 2011 UNCAF Nations Cups as well as at the 2003, 2007 and 2011 CONCACAF Gold Cups.

His final international was an October 2011 friendly match against Jamaica.

=== International goals ===
Emil Martínez: International goals
No.	Date	Venue	Opponent	Score	Result	Competition
1	2004-03-31	Independence Park, Jamaica, Kingston, Jamaica,	Jamaica	1 – 2	2–2	Friendly
2	2007-02-09	Estadio Cuscatlán, San Salvador, El Salvador,	Costa Rica	1 – 2	1–3	2007 UNCAF Nations Cup
3	2011-01-13	Estadio Rommel Fernández, Panama City, Panama,	Costa Rica	2 – 0	2–1	2011 Copa Centroamericana

== Honours ==
Marathón

- Liga Nacional de Fútbol de Honduras: 2001–02 Clausura, 2002–03 Clausura, 2004–05 Apertura, 2007–08 Apertura

Beijing Guoan

- Chinese Super League: 2009
