= Óscar Vargas (footballer) =

Honduran footballer (born 1980)

Personal information
- Full name: Óscar Ramón Vargas
- Date of birth: 1980 (age 45–46)
- Place of birth: Honduras
- Position: Forward

Senior career*
Years	Team	Apps	(Gls)
2002–2005	Marathón	52	(6)
2006–2007	Hispano		
2007–2008	Marathón	8	(1)
2008–2009	Vida		
- * Club domestic league appearances and goals as of 2013

Óscar Ramón Vargas (born 1980) is a Honduran former footballer.

== Club career ==
Playing as a forward, Óscar Vargas debuted in Honduran football with Marathón in 2002. He was the revelation of the championship by scoring the fourth goal in the victory 4-1 of his team against Olimpia, in the first leg of the final of the 2001-02 Clausura. Subsequently, Vargas was crowned champion with the club. During his three years at Marathón, he won two more titles: 2002-03 Clausura and 2004-05 Apertura.

In 2006, he was transferred to Hispano. A year later, in 2007, returned to Marathón. In the 2008-09 Apertura, Óscar Vargas moved to Vida.

== Personal life ==
He currently lives in the United States, working as a construction worker.
