= Luis Guifarro =

Honduran footballer and coach (born 1976)

Personal information
- Full name: Luis Eduardo Guifarro Pinto
- Date of birth: 25 August 1976 (age 50)
- Place of birth: Tegucigalpa, Honduras
- Position: Midfielder

Senior career*
| Years | Team | Apps | (Gls) |
| 1997–2000 | Motagua | 41 | (39) |
| 2000–2006 | Marathon | 173 | (102) |
| 2006–2008 | Real España | | (1) |
| 2010–2017 | Real Juventud | | (2) |

International career
| 1998–2005 | Honduras | 14 | (0) |
- * Club domestic league appearances and goals as of 2009-12-10

Luis Eduardo Guifarro Pinto (born 25 August 1976) is a former Honduran football player who played for F.C. Motagua, Marathón, Real España and Real Juventud.

He is currently a coach for Academia De Fútbol Chamaco Guifarro.

== Club career ==
He started his career at F.C. Motagua in 1997. He won the 1997-98 Apertura and Clausura and 1999-2000 Apertura and Clausura with Motagua, scoring 4 goals. Since 2000 to 2006 played for C.D. Marathón. There he won 2001-02 Clausura, 2002-03 Clausura, and 2004-05 Apertura. In 2006, he moved to Real C.D. España for the 2006-07 Honduran Liga Nacional, where he became champion of the 2006-07 Clausura. In 2009, he returned to active football playing for Real Juventud. He retired in 2010 and is actually a manager.

== International career ==
Guifarro made his debut for Honduras in a November 1998 friendly match against El Salvador and has earned a total of 14 caps, scoring no goals. He has represented his country at the 2003 and 2005 CONCACAF Gold Cups.

His final international was a July 2005 CONCACAF Gold Cup match against the USA.

== Personal life ==
He is a son of former Honduran international Rubén Guifarro.
