= Luis Oseguera =

Honduran footballer (born 1976)

Personal information
- Full name: Luis Enrique Oseguera
- Date of birth: 6 May 1976 (age 50)
- Place of birth: Olanchito, Honduras
- Height: 1.78 m (5 ft 10 in)
- Position: Striker

Senior career*
Years	Team	Apps	(Gls)
1992–1995	Victoria		
1995–1998	Luis Ángel Firpo		
1996	Marathón		
–	Águila		
–	Tally Juca		
1998	Suchitepéquez		
1999–2001	Broncos		
2001–2002	Victoria		
2002–2003	Motagua		(11)
2003–2004	Platense		
2004–2005	Vida		
2005–2006	Hispano		
2006–2007	Villanueva		

International career
1995	Honduras U20	3	(1)
1995	Honduras U23		
- * Club domestic league appearances and goals

Luis Enrique Oseguera (born 6 May 1976) is a former professional footballer who played in the CONCACAF Champions' Cup and FIFA World Youth Championship.

== Career ==
Born in Olanchito, Oseguera began playing football as a striker with youth sides El Sauce and Instituto San Isidro. He joined C.D. Victoria in 1992, and helped the club to a runners'-up finish in the 1992 cup. Oseguera won the 1994–95 league title with Victoria before being sold to Salvadorean side C.D. Luis Ángel Firpo in 1995.

Firpo were losing league finalists in his first two seasons (his two goals helped the club win a semi-final against his future club C.D. Águila in 1997), before winning the league in the 1997–98 season. Oseguera also played for Firpo in the 1997 CONCACAF Champions' Cup, losing in the quarter-finals to the LA Galaxy.

Oseguera had brief spells with C.D. Marathón and Guatemalan sides Tally Juca and C.D. Suchitepéquez before finishing his career in Honduras. He played for C.D. Broncos, Victoria, F.C. Motagua, Platense F.C., C.D.S. Vida, Hispano F.C. and Villanueva F.C. before retiring at age 31. He led the league in goal-scoring while with Broncos and helped Motagua to a runners'-up league finish in 2002–03.

Oseguera represented Honduras at youth level, playing in the 1995 FIFA World Youth Championship finals in Qatar. He also played in the 1995 Pan American Games.
