= Carlos Güity =

Honduran footballer (born 1974)

Personal information
- Date of birth: 3 March 1974 (age 52)

International career
Years	Team	Apps	(Gls)
2001	Honduras	5	(0)

Carlos Güity (born 3 March 1974) is a Honduran footballer. He played in five matches for the Honduras national football team in 2001. He was also part of Honduras's squad for the 2001 Copa América tournament.
