= Narciso Fernández =

Honduran footballer (born 1978)

Personal information
- Full name: Narciso Fernández Cayetano
- Date of birth: November 5, 1978 (age 47)
- Place of birth: Guadalupe, Honduras
- Height: 1.67 m (5 ft 6 in)
- Positions: Full back; midfielder; forward

Senior career*
Years	Team	Apps	(Gls)
1999–2001	Marathón	53	(7)
2002	Olimpia	17	(1)
2002–2005	Marathón	87	(11)
2006	Platense	18	(3)
2006–2007	Hispano	16	(1)
2008	Platense	14	(0)
Total		205	(23)

International career^{‡}
2001	Honduras	3	(0)
- * Club domestic league appearances and goals ‡ National team caps and goals as of 5 January 2013

Narciso Fernández Cayetano (born November 5, 1978) is a Honduran former footballer who played as a full back, midfielder and forward.

== Club career ==
Nicknamed Kalusha, Fernández played the majority of his career for Marathón and also had spells at Olimpia, Marathón, Platense and Hispano. He rejoined Platense ahead of the 2008 Clausura.

He scored 23 league goals in total.

== International career ==
Fernández made three international appearances for Honduras, playing in the 2001 UNCAF Nations Cup against Panama, Nicaragua, and El Salvador.

== Personal life ==
Fernández is married with Nelly and has five son, the wedding was celebrated in Guadalupe

A
