= Darwin Pacheco =

Honduran football defender (born 1976)

Personal information
- Full name: Darwin Jesús Pacheco Chinchilla
- Date of birth: July 24, 1976 (age 50)
- Place of birth: Sinuapa, Honduras
- Height: 1.88 m (6 ft 2 in)
- Position: Defender

Senior career*
Years	Team	Apps	(Gls)
1998–2006	Marathón	198	(9)
2006–2009	Hispano		(1)
2009	Deportes Savio	4	(0)
2009–2013	Xinabajul		

International career^{‡}
2005	Honduras	5	(0)
- * Club domestic league appearances and goals as of 6 June 2010 ‡ National team caps and goals as of 2005

Darwin Jesús Pacheco Chinchilla (born July 24, 1976) is a Honduran football defender who currently plays for Deportivo Xinabajul in the Liga Nacional de Guatemala.

== Club career ==
A big defender, Pacheco previously played for Marathón, Hispano and Deportes Savio in his native Honduras. He moved to Gilberto Yearwood's Guatemalan side Xinabajul in September 2009. In April 2011 he was relegated with Xinabajul.

== International career ==
Pacheco made his debut for Honduras in a February 2005 UNCAF Nations Cup match against Nicaragua and has earned a total of 5 caps, scoring no goals, all at the 2005 UNCAF Nations Cup.

His final international was the match against Costa Rica.
