= 2007–08 C.D. Marathón season =

Marathón
2007–08 season
- Chairman: Yankel Rosenthal
- Manager: Manuel Keosseián (Apertura); José de la Paz Herrera (Clausura)
- Apertura: Champion
- Clausura: Runner-up
- Top goalscorer: League: Apertura:Emil Martínez (10 goals); Clausura: Edmilson da Silva (8 goals); All: Emil Martínez (11 goals)
Home colours	Away colours

The 2007–08 C.D. Marathón season in the Honduran football league was divided into two halves, Apertura and Clausura. Marathón was capable to win one tournament, having achieved the sixth championship in their history.

== Apertura ==
=== Squad ===
Note: Flags indicate national team as defined under FIFA eligibility rules; some limited exceptions apply. Players may hold more than one non-FIFA nationality.

No.	Pos.	Nation	Player
–	GK	HON	Víctor Coello
–	GK	URU	Juan Obelar
–	GK	HON	Adalid Puerto
–	DF	HON	Mauricio Sabillón
–	DF	HON	David Álvarez
–	DF	HON	Milton Palacios
–	DF	HON	Luis Santamaría
–	DF	HON	Erick Norales
–	DF	HON	Mario Beata
–	DF	HON	Juan Carlos García
–	DF	HON	Óscar Bonilla
–	DF	BRA	Nilberto da Silva
–	MF	HON	Astor Henríquez
–	MF	HON	Dennis Ferrera
–	MF	HON	Reinieri Mayorquín

No.	Pos.	Nation	Player
–	MF	HON	Mario Berríos
–	MF	HON	Arnold Solórzano
–	MF	HON	Abel Rodríguez
–	MF	HON	Mariano Acevedo
–	MF	HON	Emil Martínez
–	MF	HON	Carlos Oliva
–	MF	HON	Julián Rápalo
–	MF	BRA	Eberson Amaral
–	MF	HON	Pompilio Mejía
–	FW	HON	Luis López
–	FW	CRC	Erick Scott
–	FW	HON	Mitchel Brown
–	FW	HON	Óscar Vargas
–	FW	BRA	Edmilson da Silva
–	FW	BRA	Marcelo Ferreira

=== Standings ===
Pos	Team	Pld	W	D	L	GF	GA	GD	Pts	Qualification or relegation
1	Marathón	18	10	5	3	27	16	+11	35	Qualification to the Semifinals
2	Motagua	18	9	5	4	28	19	+9	32	Qualification to the Semifinals
3	Victoria	18	7	10	1	22	12	+10	31	Qualification to the Semifinals
4	Olimpia	18	6	9	3	19	13	+6	27	Qualification to the Semifinals
5	Deportes Savio	18	5	7	6	14	15	−1	22	

Updated to match(es) played on 25 November 2007. Source:

=== Matches ===
==== Results by round ====
Round	1	2	3	4	5	6	7	8	9	10	11	12	13	14	15	16	17	18
Ground	H	H	A	H	A	A	H	A	A	A	A	H	A	H	H	A	H	H
Result	D	W	W	L	L	D	D	W	W	L	W	W	D	W	W	D	W	W

A = Away; H = Home; W = Win; D = Draw; L = Loss

==== Regular season ====
11 August 2007 Round 1	Marathón	2 – 2	Savio	San Pedro Sula, Cortés
	Brown 38'; Gáldamez 78'		Euceda 26'; Zepeda 56'	Stadium: Estadio Olímpico Metropolitano

18 August 2007 Round 2	Marathón	1 – 0	Platense	San Pedro Sula, Cortés Department
	Oliva 38'			Stadium: Estadio Francisco Morazán

25 August 2007 Round 3	Real España	0 – 1	Marathón	San Pedro Sula, Cortés
			M. Palacios 68'	Stadium: Estadio Francisco Morazán

29 August 2007 Round 4	Marathón	0 – 1	Victoria	San Pedro Sula, Cortés
			Wéber 52'	Stadium: Estadio Francisco Morazán

2 September 2007 Round 5	Motagua	4 – 1	Marathón	Tegucigalpa, Francisco Morazán
19:30 (UTC−06)	Castillo 2'; Rodas 28'; Guevara 53'; Bernárdez 78'		Martínez 32' (pen.)	Stadium: Estadio Tiburcio Carías Andino

8 September 2007 Round 6	Hispano	2 – 2	Marathón	Comayagua, Comayagua
	Jiménez 33' 70' (pen.)		Oliva 11' da Silva 51'	Stadium: Estadio Carlos Miranda

15 September 2007 Round 7	Marathón	1 – 1	Olimpia	San Pedro Sula, Cortés
	Santamaría 69'		Velásquez 39'	Stadium: Estadio Olímpico Metropolitano

22 September 2007 Round 8	Vida	1 – 4	Marathón	La Ceiba, Atlántida
16:00 (UTC−06)	Calderón 58'		Brown 33' 45'; Martínez 67' (pen.); Henríquez 70'

30 September 2007 Round 9	Atlético Olanchano	0 – 1	Marathón	Catacamas, Olancho
			Martínez 49' (pen.)	Stadium: Estadio Rubén Guifarro

7 October 2007 Round 10	Savio	1 – 0	Marathón	Santa Rosa de Copán, Copán
14:00 (UTC−06)	Pereira 42'			Stadium: Estadio Sergio Reyes

13 October 2007 Round 11	Platense	1 – 3	Marathón	Puerto Cortés, Cortés
	Sánchez 54'		Martínez 14' 64' (pen.) 78'	Stadium: Estadio Excélsior

21 October 2007 Round 12	Marathón	2 – 0	Real España	San Pedro Sula, Cortés
	Martínez 13' 81'			Stadium: Estadio Olímpico Metropolitano

27 October 2007 Round 13	Victoria	2 – 2	Marathón	La Ceiba, Atlántida
	J. Izaguirre 41'; Rosales 48'		M. Palacios 30'; Oliva 74'	Stadium: Estadio Nilmo Edwards

7 November 2007 Round 14	Marathón	1 – 0	Motagua	San Pedro Sula, Cortés
				Stadium: Estadio Olímpico Metropolitano

3 November 2007 Round 15	Marathón	3 – 0	Hispano	San Pedro Sula, Cortés
	Brown 24' 26'; López 51'			Stadium: Estadio Olímpico Metropolitano

11 November 2007 Round 16	Olimpia	1 – 1	Marathón	Tegucigalpa, Francisco Morazán
	Kardeck 83'		Martínez 40'	Stadium: Estadio Tiburcio Carías Andino

18 November 2007 Round 17	Marathón	1 – 0	Vida	San Pedro Sula, Cortés
	Brown 44'			Stadium: Estadio Olímpico Metropolitano

25 November 2007 Round 18	Marathón	1 – 0	Atlético Olanchano	San Pedro Sula, Cortés
	Berríos 65'			Stadium: Estadio Olímpico Metropolitano

==== Semifinals ====
2 December 2007 1st leg	Olimpia	1 – 0	Marathón	Tegucigalpa, Francisco Morazán
19:30 (UTC−06)	Kardeck 59'			Stadium: Estadio Tiburcio Carías Andino

8 December 2007 2nd leg	Marathón	2 – 1	Olimpia	San Pedro Sula, Cortés
19:00 (UTC−06)	Norales 20'; Martínez 72'		Tilguath 45+1'	Stadium: Estadio Olímpico Metropolitano

- Marathón 2-2 Olimpia on aggregate score; Marathón advanced on better regular performance.

==== Final ====
===== Marathón vs Motagua =====
16 December 2007 1st leg	Motagua	0 – 0	Marathón	Tegucigalpa, Francisco Morazán
(UTC−06:00)				Stadium: Estadio Tiburcio Carías Andino; Attendance: 16,042; Referee: José Molina

22 December 2007 2nd leg	Marathón	2 – 0	Motagua	Tegucigalpa, Francisco Morazán
19:30 (UTC−06:00)	Brown 1'; Scott 78'			Stadium: Estadio Tiburcio Carías Andino; Attendance: 26,596; Referee: Ricardo Zelaya

- Marathón won 2-0 on aggregate score.

== Clausura ==
=== Squad ===
Note: Flags indicate national team as defined under FIFA eligibility rules; some limited exceptions apply. Players may hold more than one non-FIFA nationality.

No.	Pos.	Nation	Player
–	GK	HON	Víctor Coello
–	GK	URU	Juan Obelar
–	GK	HON	Adalid Puerto
–	DF	HON	Mauricio Sabillón
–	DF	HON	David Álvarez
–	DF	HON	Milton Palacios
–	DF	HON	Luis Santamaría
–	DF	HON	Erick Norales
–	DF	HON	Mario Beata
–	DF	HON	Juan Carlos García
–	DF	HON	Óscar Bonilla
–	DF	BRA	Nilberto da Silva
–	MF	HON	Astor Henríquez
–	MF	HON	Dennis Ferrera
–	MF	HON	Reinieri Mayorquín

No.	Pos.	Nation	Player
–	MF	HON	Mario Berríos
–	MF	HON	Arnold Solórzano
–	MF	HON	Mariano Acevedo
–	MF	HON	Óscar Galeas
–	MF	HON	Carlos Oliva
–	MF	HON	Julián Rápalo
–	MF	HON	Orvin Paz
–	MF	BRA	Eberson Amaral
–	FW	HON	Luis López
–	FW	CRC	Andy Furtado
–	FW	HON	José Güity
–	FW	HON	Óscar Vargas
–	FW	BRA	Edmilson da Silva
–	FW	BRA	Marcelo Ferreira

=== Standings ===
Pos	Team	Pld	W	D	L	GF	GA	GD	Pts	Qualification or relegation
1	Olimpia	18	9	6	3	28	13	+15	33	Qualification to the Semifinals
2	Marathón	18	9	3	6	30	23	+7	30	Qualification to the Semifinals
3	Real España	18	8	4	6	26	22	+4	28	Qualification to the Semifinals
4	Motagua	18	8	3	7	23	19	+4	27	Qualification to the Semifinals
5	Hispano	18	7	5	6	24	25	−1	26	

Updated to match(es) played on 3 May 2008. Source:

=== Matches ===
==== Results by round ====
Round	1	2	3	4	5	6	7	8	9	10	11	12	13	14	15	16	17	18
Ground	H	A	H	A	H	A	H	A	A	A	H	A	H	H	H	A	H	H
Result	D	L	W	L	W	W	L	W	D	L	W	W	W	D	L	L	W	W

A = Away; H = Home; W = Win; D = Draw; L = Loss

==== Regular season ====
15 January 2008 Round 1	Marathón	2 – 2	Platense	San Pedro Sula, Cortés
	Brown; Martínez			Stadium: Estadio Olímpico Metropolitano

20 January 2008 Round 2	Savio	1 – 0	Marathón	Santa Rosa de Copán, Copán
14:00 (UTC−06)				Stadium: Estadio Sergio Reyes

26 January 2008 Round 3	Marathón	2 – 1	Atlético Olanchano	Puerto Cortés, Cortés
	Güity; Berríos			Stadium: Estadio Excélsior

30 January 2008 Round 4	Vida	2 – 1	Marathón	La Ceiba, Atlántida
	D. Hernández 68'; Grant 85'		Güity 46'	Stadium: Estadio Nilmo Edwards

2 February 2008 Round 5	Marathón	2 – 1	Motagua	San Pedro Sula, Cortés
16:00 (UTC−06)	Amaral 68' (pen.); Ferreira 90'		Jocimar 50'	Stadium: Estadio Olímpico Metropolitano

9 February 2008 Round 6	Real España	2 – 3	Marathón	San Pedro Sula, Cortés
19:00 (UTC−06)			N. Silva da Silva	Stadium: Estadio Francisco Morazán

20 February 2008 Round 7	Marathón	0 – 2	Olimpia	San Pedro Sula, Cortés
				Stadium: Estadio Olímpico Metropolitano

24 February 2008 Round 8	Hispano	0 – 1	Marathón	Comayagua, Comayagua
			da Silva 68'	Stadium: Estadio Carlos Miranda

1 March 2008 Round 9	Victoria	0 – 0	Marathón	La Ceiba, Atlántida
16:30 (UTC−06)				Stadium: Estadio Nilmo Edwards

9 March 2008 Round 10	Platense	3 – 2	Marathón	Puerto Cortés, Cortés
				Stadium: Estadio Excélsior

12 March 2008 Round 11	Marathón	2 – 1	Savio	San Pedro Sula, Cortés
15:00 (UTC−06)				Stadium: Estadio Olímpico Metropolitano

19 March 2008 Round 12	Atlético Olanchano	0 – 2	Marathón	Catacamas, Olancho
19:30 (UTC−06)				Stadium: Estadio Rubén Guifarro

29 March 2008 Round 13	Marathón	3 – 1	Vida	San Pedro Sula, Cortés
19:00 (UTC−06)				Stadium: Estadio Olímpico Metropolitano

6 April 2008 Round 14	Motagua	3 – 3	Marathón	Tegucigalpa, Francisco Morazán
16:00 (UTC−06)				Stadium: Estadio Tiburcio Carías Andino

12 April 2008 Round 15	Marathón	0 – 1	Real España	San Pedro Sula, Cortés
				Stadium: Estadio Olímpico Metropolitano

18 April 2008 Round 16	Olimpia	1 – 0	Marathón	Comayagua, Comayagua
16:00 (UTC−06)	Turcios 39'			Stadium: Estadio Carlos Miranda

27 April 2008 Round 17	Marathón	5 – 2	Hispano	San Pedro Sula, Cortés
	da Silva 5' 67' 89'; Henríquez 62'; Ferreira 86'		Portillo 1'; Isaula 7'	Stadium: Estadio Olímpico Metropolitano

3 May 2008 Round 18	Marathón	2 – 0	Victoria	Comayagua, Comayagua
19:30 (UTC−06)

==== Semifinals ====
7 May 2008 1st round	Real España	1 – 3	Marathón	San Pedro Sula, Cortés
19:30 (UTC−06)	Lalín 71'		da Silva 42'; Henríquez 54'; Güity 75'	Stadium: Estadio Olímpico Metropolitano

10 May 2008 2nd leg	Marathón	2 – 4	Real España	San Pedro Sula, Cortés
19:00 (UTC−06)	Güity 4'; Ferreira 80'		Lalín 22'; Valladares 43'; E. Ferreira 50'; Obelar 90+1' (o.g.)	Stadium: Estadio Olímpico Metropolitano

- Marathón 5–5 Real España on aggregate score; Marathón advanced on better regular season performance.

==== Final ====
18 May 2008 1st leg	Marathón	1 – 1	Olimpia	San Pedro Sula, Cortés
17:00 (UTC−06)	Furtado 68'		Turcios 35'	Stadium: Estadio Olímpico Metropolitano; Attendance: 29,000; Referee: José Molina

24 May 2008 2nd leg	Olimpia	1 – 0	Marathón	Comayagua, Comayagua
16:00 (UTC−06)	Velásquez 60' (pen.)			Stadium: Estadio Carlos Miranda; Attendance: 9,474; Referee: Mario Moncada

- Olimpia won 2–1 on aggregate.
