= 2007–08 Honduran Liga Nacional =

Liga Nacional
- Season: 2007–08
- Champions: Apertura: Marathón; Clausura: Olimpia
- Relegated: Atlético Olanchano
- Champions League: Marathón; Olimpia
- Matches: 192
- Top goalscorer: Apertura: Martínez; Clausura: Velásquez

The 2007–08 season in the Honduran Liga Nacional was the 42nd season in the top fight in Honduran football; it ran from August 2007 to May 2008. The season was split into two tournaments (Apertura and Clausura) which defined the 51st and 52nd national champions in the history of the league. C.D. Marathón and Club Deportivo Olimpia as winners of each tournament qualified to the 2008–09 CONCACAF Champions League.

== 2007–08 teams ==
Deportes Savio from Santa Rosa de Copán was promoted from the 2006–07 Liga de Ascenso.

- Atlético Olanchano
- Deportes Savio
- Hispano F.C.
- C.D. Marathón
- C.D. Motagua
- C.D. Olimpia
- C.D. Platense
- Real C.D. España
- C.D. Victoria
- C.D.S. Vida

== Apertura ==
The Apertura tournament was played from 11 August to 22 December 2007. C.D. Marathón captured its 6th domestic league.

=== Regular season ===
==== Standings ====
Pos	Team	Pld	W	D	L	GF	GA	GD	Pts	Qualification or relegation
1	Marathón	18	10	5	3	27	16	+11	35	Qualification to the Semifinals
2	Motagua	18	9	5	4	28	19	+9	32	Qualification to the Semifinals
3	Victoria	18	7	10	1	22	12	+10	31	Qualification to the Semifinals
4	Olimpia	18	6	9	3	19	13	+6	27	Qualification to the Semifinals
5	Deportes Savio	18	5	7	6	14	15	−1	22	
6	Real España	18	6	4	8	22	25	−3	22	
7	Hispano	18	5	6	7	19	22	−3	21	
8	Vida	18	4	8	6	18	22	−4	20	
9	Platense	18	3	6	9	17	28	−11	15	
10	Atlético Olanchano	18	3	4	11	15	29	−14	13	

Updated to match(es) played on 25 November 2007. Source:

==== Results ====
As of 25 November 2007

Home \ Away	OLA	SAV	HIS	MAR	MOT	OLI	PLA	RES	VIC	VID
Atlético Olanchano		1–2	1–1	0–1	1–2	1–1	4–2	0–1	0–1	3–1
Deportes Savio	0–1		0–2	1–0	1–1	1–0	1–0	1–1	1–1	1–1
Hispano	2–0	2–1		2–2	2–1	0–0	1–2	0–1	0–0	2–3
Marathón	1–0	2–2	3–0		1–0	1–1	1–0	2–0	0–1	1–0
Motagua	2–0	1–0	1–1	4–1		0–0	3–1	2–4	1–0	2–0
Olimpia	1–1	1–0	2–0	1–1	1–2		3–1	1–0	0–0	2–1
Platense	0–0	0–2	1–2	1–3	3–2	0–0		2–2	0–0	0–0
Real España	3–1	1–0	1–0	0–1	1–2	1–3	2–3		1–2	1–1
Victoria	4–0	0–0	2–2	2–2	2–2	2–1	1–1	2–0		1–1
Vida	4–1	0–0	1–0	1–4	0–0	1–1	1–0	2–2	0–1	

Source: Soccerway
Legend: Blue = home team win; Yellow = draw; Red = away team win.

=== Final round ===
==== Semifinals ====
===== Marathón vs Olimpia =====
2 December 2007 1st leg	Olimpia	1–0	Marathón	Tegucigalpa, Francisco Morazán
16:00 (UTC−06:00)	Kardeck 59'	Report		Stadium: Estadio Tiburcio Carías Andino; Attendance: 9,467; Referee: Benigno Pineda

8 December 2007 2nd leg	Marathón	2–1	Olimpia	San Pedro Sula, Cortés
19:30 (UTC−06:00)	Norales 20'; Martínez 72'	Report	Tilguath 45+1'	Stadium: Estadio Olímpico Metropolitano; Attendance: 18,638; Referee: Mario Moncada

- Marathón 2–2 Olimpia on aggregate score; Marathón advanced on better regular season performance.

===== Motagua vs Victoria =====
1 December 2007 1st leg	Victoria	1–1	Motagua	La Ceiba, Atlántida
19:30 (UTC−06:00)	Rosales 20'	Report	Guevara 2'	Stadium: Estadio Nilmo Edwards; Attendance: 9,634; Referee: José Molina

9 December 2007 2nd leg	Motagua	2–0	Victoria	Tegucigalpa, Francisco Morazán
16:00 (UTC−06:00)	Rodas 41'; Guevara 84'	Report		Stadium: Estadio Tiburcio Carías Andino; Attendance: 11,899; Referee: Ricardo Zelaya

- Motagua won 3–1 on aggregate score.

==== Final ====
===== Marathón vs Motagua =====
16 December 2007 1st leg	Motagua	0–0	Marathón	Tegucigalpa, Francisco Morazán
16:00 (UTC−06:00)		Report		Stadium: Estadio Tiburcio Carías Andino; Attendance: 16,042; Referee: José Molina

22 December 2007 2nd leg	Marathón	2–0	Motagua	San Pedro Sula, Cortés
19:30 (UTC−06:00)	Brown 1'; Scott 78'	Report		Stadium: Estadio Olímpico Metropolitano; Attendance: 26,596; Referee: Ricardo Zelaya

Marathón	Motagua

GK	27	(Uruguay) Juan Obelar
RB	–	(Honduras) Astor Henríquez	(substituted off) 48'
CB	–	(Honduras) Mario Beata
CB	–	(Honduras) Erick Norales	(substituted off) 68'
LB	–	(Brazil) Nilberto da Silva
DM	–	(Honduras) Óscar Bonilla
CM	12	(Honduras) Mariano Acevedo
CM	19	(Honduras) Mario Berríos
AM	7	(Honduras) Emil Martínez
CF	21	(Costa Rica) Erick Scott
CF	11	(Honduras) Mitchel Brown	(substituted off) 75'
Substitutions:
DF	25	(Honduras) Luis Santamaría	(substituted on) 48'
DF	-	(Honduras) Milton Palacios	(substituted on) 68'
MF	8	(Honduras) Carlos Oliva	(substituted on) 75'
Manager:
(Uruguay) Manuel Keosseián

GK	–	(Honduras) Ricardo Canales
RB	–	(Honduras) Samir García
CB	–	(Honduras) Osman Chávez
CB	24	(Honduras) Víctor Bernárdez
LB	-	(Honduras) Emilio Izaguirre
CM	–	(Honduras) Rubén Matamoros	(substituted off) 34'
CM	14	(Honduras) Luis Guzmán
CM	32	(Honduras) Jorge Claros
AM	-	(Honduras) Amado Guevara
CF	9	(Honduras) Jairo Martínez	(substituted off) 61'
CF	10	(Brazil) Jocimar Nascimento
Substitutions:
FW	–	(Honduras) Jefferson Bernárdez	(substituted on) 34'
DF	–	(Honduras) Milton Reyes	(substituted on) 61'
Manager:
(Honduras) Ramón Maradiaga

- Marathón won 2–0 on aggregate score.

Liga Nacional
2007–08 Apertura champion

6th title

=== Top goalscorers ===
As of 22 December 2007

10 goals

- (Honduras) Emil Martínez (Marathón)

7 goals

- (Honduras) Mitchel Brown (Marathón)
- (Honduras) Abidán Solís (Victoria)

6 goals

- (Honduras) Amado Guevara (Motagua)
- (Honduras) Luis Rodas (Motagua)

5 goals

- (Brazil) Edilson Pereira (Deportes Savio)
- (Brazil) Jocimar Nascimento (Motagua)
- (Honduras) Milton Núñez (Olimpia)
- (Brazil) Marcelo dos Santos (Platense)

4 goals

- (Honduras) Carlos Salinas (Atlético Olanchano)
- (Argentina) Sergio Diduch (Hispano)
- (Honduras) Henry Jiménez (Hispano)
- (Brazil) Allan do Santos (Olimpia)
- (Brazil) José Dias (Real España)
- (Brazil) Everaldo Ferreira (Real España)
- (Argentina) Carlos Fretes (Real España)
- (Honduras) Héctor Flores (Victoria)
- (Honduras) Johnny Calderón (Vida)

3 goals

- (Honduras) Wilmer Ramos (Atlético Olanchano)
- (Belize) Harrison Róches (Deportes Savio)
- (Honduras) José Güity (Hispano)
- (Honduras) Carlos Oliva (Marathón)
- (Uruguay) Óscar Torlacoff (Motagua)
- (Honduras) Reynaldo Tilguath (Olimpia)

2 goals

- (Brazil) Denilson Costa (Atlético Olanchano)
- (Honduras) Walter Hernández (Hispano)
- (Honduras) Rigoberto Padilla (Hispano)
- (Honduras) Milton Palacios (Marathón)
- (Brazil) Pedro Santana (Motagua)
- (Honduras) Danilo Turcios (Olimpia)
- (Honduras) Wilmer Velásquez (Olimpia)
- (Honduras) Quiarol Arzú (Platense)
- (Honduras) Bani Lozano (Platense)
- (Honduras) Marvin Sánchez (Platense)
- (Brazil) Douglas Caetano (Real España)
- (Honduras) Marlon Peña (Real España)
- (Honduras) Melvin Valladares (Real España)
- (Honduras) Marvin Chávez (Victoria)
- (Honduras) Jaime Rosales (Victoria)
- (Honduras) Jerry Bengtson (Vida)
- (Brazil) Ney Costa (Vida)
- (Uruguay) Richard Pérez (Vida)

1 goal

- (Honduras) Jorge Lozano (Atlético Olanchano)
- (Honduras) Elmer Marín (Atlético Olanchano)
- (Honduras) Merlyn Membreño (Atlético Olanchano)
- (Honduras) Edgar Núñez (Atlético Olanchano)
- (Honduras) Guillermo Ramírez (Atlético Olanchano)
- (Honduras) Mario Euceda (Deportes Savio)
- (Honduras) Johny Galdámez (Deportes Savio)
- (Honduras) Edgar Mejía (Deportes Savio)
- (Honduras) Óscar Zepeda (Deportes Savio)
- (Honduras) Diktmar Hernández (Hispano)
- (Honduras) Mario Berríos (Marathon)
- (Brazil) Edmilson da Silva (Marathón)
- (Honduras) Astor Henríquez (Marathón)
- (Honduras) Luis López (Marathón)
- (Honduras) Erick Norales (Marathon)
- (Honduras) Luis Santamaría (Marathón)
- (Costa Rica) Erick Scott (Marathon)
- (Honduras) Víctor Bernárdez (Motagua)
- (Honduras) Fernando Castillo (Motagua)
- (Honduras) Walter López (Motagua)
- (Honduras) Rubén Matamoros (Motagua)
- (Honduras) Maynor Figueroa (Olimpia)
- (Honduras) Jerry Palacios (Olimpia)
- (Honduras) Hendry Thomas (Olimpia)
- (Honduras) David Meza (Platense)
- (Honduras) César Zelaya (Platense)
- (Honduras) Eddy Vega (Platense)
- (Honduras) Elkin González (Real España)
- (Honduras) Allan Lalín (Real España)
- (Honduras) Carlos Palacios (Real España)
- (Uruguay) Fernando Cardozo (Victoria)
- (Honduras) Mario Gómez (Victoria)
- (Honduras) Júnior Izaguirre (Victoria)
- (Honduras) Ninrrol Medina (Victoria)
- (Uruguay) Mauricio Weber (Victoria)
- (Honduras) Darian Álvarez (Vida)
- (Honduras) Borghi Arbizú (Vida)
- (Argentina) Miguel Farrera (Vida)
- (Honduras) Ángel Hill (Vida)
- (Honduras) Clifford Laing (Vida)
- (Honduras) Modesto Rodas (Vida)

== Clausura ==
The Clausura tournament was played from 12 January to 24 May 2008. C.D. Olimpia captured its 21st domestic league.

=== Regular season ===
==== Standings ====
Pos	Team	Pld	W	D	L	GF	GA	GD	Pts	Qualification or relegation
1	Olimpia	18	9	6	3	28	13	+15	33	Qualification to the Semifinals
2	Marathón	18	9	3	6	30	23	+7	30	Qualification to the Semifinals
3	Real España	18	8	4	6	26	22	+4	28	Qualification to the Semifinals
4	Motagua	18	8	3	7	23	19	+4	27	Qualification to the Semifinals
5	Hispano	18	7	5	6	24	25	−1	26	
6	Victoria	18	6	6	6	17	17	0	24	
7	Atlético Olanchano	18	6	3	9	19	25	−6	21	
8	Platense	18	5	5	8	18	24	−6	20	
9	Deportes Savio	18	4	7	7	18	24	−6	19	
10	Vida	18	4	6	8	18	29	−11	18	

Updated to match(es) played on 3 May 2008. Source:

==== Results ====
As of 3 May 2008

Home \ Away	OLA	SAV	HIS	MAR	MOT	OLI	PLA	RES	VIC	VID
Atlético Olanchano		3–2	3–2	0–2	1–0	0–2	1–0	3–2	1–2	3–0
Deportes Savio	0–0		1–0	1–0	0–0	1–1	4–0	2–1	1–2	1–1
Hispano	2–0	3–1		0–1	2–0	1–1	2–2	1–1	2–0	1–0
Marathón	2–1	2–1	5–2		2–1	0–2	2–2	0–1	2–0	3–1
Motagua	2–0	2–0	2–0	3–3		2–1	3–1	2–1	1–1	2–0
Olimpia	0–0	1–1	5–0	1–0	0–1		2–1	3–0	1–0	2–0
Platense	3–1	3–0	0–2	3–2	1–0	0–2		0–0	0–0	0–0
Real España	1–0	4–1	0–0	2–3	2–1	2–0	2–1		2–1	3–1
Victoria	1–0	0–0	1–2	0–0	2–0	2–2	1–0	1–1		0–1
Vida	2–2	1–1	2–2	2–1	2–1	2–2	0–1	2–1	1–3	

Source: Soccerway
Legend: Blue = home team win; Yellow = draw; Red = away team win.

=== Final round ===
==== Semifinals ====
===== Olimpia vs Motagua =====
7 May 2008 1st leg	Motagua	1–4	Olimpia	Danlí, El Paraíso
15:00 (UTC−06:00)	Matamoros 47'	Report	Bruschi 21'; Thomas 49'; R. Núñez 54'; M. Núñez 78'	Stadium: Estadio Marcelo Tinoco; Attendance: 5,291; Referee: Mario Moncada

10 May 2008 2nd leg	Olimpia	3–1	Motagua	Comayagua, Comayagua
19:00 (UTC−06:00)	Turcios 19'; Bruschi 42'; Velásquez 62'	Report	Nascimento 38'	Stadium: Estadio Carlos Miranda; Referee: Beningno Pineda

- Olimpia won 7–2 on aggregate score.

===== Marathón vs Real España =====
7 May 2008 1st leg	Real España	1–3	Marathón	San Pedro Sula, Cortés
19:30 (UTC−06:00)	Lalín 71'	Report	da Silva 42'; Henríquez 54'; Güity 75'	Stadium: Estadio Olímpico Metropolitano; Attendance: 10,562; Referee: Óscar Moncada

10 May 2008 2nd leg	Marathón	2–4	Real España	San Pedro Sula, Cortés
19:00 (UTC−06:00)	Güity 4'; Ferreira 80'	Report	Lalín 22'; Valladares 43'; Ferreira 50'; Obelar 90+1' (o.g.)	Stadium: Estadio Olímpico Metropolitano; Attendance: 7,553; Referee: José Molina

- Marathón 5–5 Real España on aggregate score; Marathón advanced on better regular season performance.

==== Final ====
===== Olimpia vs Marathón =====
18 May 2008 1st leg	Marathón	1–1	Olimpia	San Pedro Sula, Cortés
17:00 (UTC−06:00)	Furtado 68'	Report	Turcios 35'	Stadium: Estadio Olímpico Metropolitano; Attendance: 29,000; Referee: José Molina

Marathón	Olimpia

GK	1	(Honduras) Víctor Coello
RB	23	(Brazil) Mauricio Sabillón	Yellow card
CB	–	(Honduras) Milton Palacios	Yellow card
CB	5	(Honduras) Erick Norales
LB	–	(Honduras) Óscar Bonilla
CM	13	(Honduras) Dennis Ferrera
CM	–	(Honduras) Reinieri Mayorquín	Yellow card
CM	–	(Honduras) Astor Henríquez	Yellow card	(substituted off) 45'
CM	19	(Honduras) Mario Berríos	Yellow card
CF	–	(Honduras) José Güity	(substituted off) 64'
CF	32	(Brazil) Edmilson da Silva	Yellow card	(substituted off) 77'
Substitutions:
MF	10	(Brazil) Eberson Amaral	(substituted on) 45'
FW	21	(Costa Rica) Andy Furtado	(substituted on) 64'
FW	9	(Brazil) Marcelo Ferreira	(substituted on) 77'
Manager:
(Honduras) José de la Paz Herrera

GK	27	(Honduras) Noel Valladares
RB	–	(Honduras) Boniek García	Yellow card
CB	–	(Brazil) Fábio de Souza	Yellow card
CB	–	(Honduras) Sergio Mendoza	(substituted off) 74'
LB	-	(Honduras) Edwin Ávila	Yellow card
CM	–	(Honduras) Hendry Thomas
CM	–	(Honduras) Walter Hernández	Yellow card		(substituted off) 83'
RM	–	(Honduras) Danilo Turcios
LM	-	(Honduras) Ramón Núñez
ST	33	(Uruguay) Ramiro Bruschi	(substituted off) 79'
ST	11	(Honduras) Wilmer Velásquez
Substitutions:
DF	–	(Honduras) Rony Morales	(substituted on) 74'
FW	–	(Brazil) Allan Kardeck	(substituted on) 79'
MF	–	(Honduras) Jesús Navas	(substituted on) 83'	–	Manager:
(Mexico) Juan de Dios Castillo

24 May 2008 2nd leg	Olimpia	1–0	Marathón	Comayagua, Comayagua
16:00 (UTC−06:00)	Velásquez 60' (pen.)	Report		Stadium: Estadio Carlos Miranda; Attendance: 9,474; Referee: Mario Moncada

Olimpia	Marathón

GK	27	(Honduras) Noel Valladares	Yellow card
RB	–	(Honduras) Sergio Mendoza
CB	5	(Brazil) Fábio de Souza	(substituted off) 57'
CB	–	(Honduras) Rony Morales
LB	–	(Honduras) Boniek GFarcía	(substituted off) 46'
CM	–	(Honduras) Hendry Thomas	Yellow card
CM	–	(Honduras) Walter Hernández
RM	–	(Honduras) Danilo Turcios	Yellow card
LM	–	(Honduras) Ramón Núñez
CF	33	(Uruguay) Ramiro Bruschi
CF	11	(Honduras) Wilmer Velásquez	(substituted off) 77'
Substitutions:
FW	–	(Honduras) Milton Núñez	(substituted on) 77'
MF	–	(Honduras) Jesús Navas	(substituted on) 80'
DF	–	(Argentina) Nahúm Ávila	(substituted on) 88'
Manager:
(Mexico) Juan de Dios Castillo

GK	1	(Honduras) Víctor Coello	Yellow card
RB	23	(Honduras) Mauricio Sabillón
CB	–	(Honduras) Erick Norales	Yellow card
CB	5	(Honduras) Mario Beata	Yellow card
LB	–	(Honduras) Óscar Bonilla
CM	–	(Honduras) Reinieri Mayorquín	Yellow card
CM	–	(Honduras) Astor Henríquez	(substituted off) 23'
CM	19	(Honduras) Mario Berríos
AM	10	(Brazil) Eberson Amaral	(substituted off) 55'
CF	–	(Honduras) José Güity
CF	32	(Brazil) Edmilson da Silva	Yellow card
Substitutions:
DF	–	(Honduras) Milton Palacios	(substituted on) 23'	(substituted off) 50'
MF	–	(Honduras) Mariano Acevedo	(substituted on) 50'
MF	8	(Honduras) Carlos Oliva	(substituted on) 55'
Manager:
(Honduras) José Herrera

- Olimpia won 2–1 on aggregate score.

Liga Nacional
2007–08 Clausura champion

21st title

=== Top goalscorers ===
10 goals

- (Honduras) Wilmer Velásquez (Olimpia)

9 goals

- (Brazil) Jocimar Nascimento (Motagua)

8 goals

- (Brazil) Edmilson da Silva (Marathón)
- (Brazil) Douglas Caetano (Real España)
- (Uruguay) Claudio Cardozo (Vida)

6 goals

- (Brazil) Ney Costa (Deportes Savio)

5 goals

- (Honduras) Carlos Pavón (Real España)
- (Honduras) Eduardo Bennett (Atlético Olanchano)
- (Uruguay) Oscar Torlacoff (Motagua)
- (Costa Rica) Andy Furtado (Marathón)

4 goals

- (Brazil) Marcelo Cabrita (Platense)
- (Honduras) Orvin Paz (Deportes Savio)
- (Honduras) Walter Hernández (Olimpia)
- (Honduras) Danilo Turcios (Olimpia)
- (Honduras) José Güity (Marathón)
- (Honduras) Henry Jiménez (Hispano)

3 goals

- (Brazil) Marcelo Ferreira (Marathón)
- (Honduras) Marvin Chávez (Victoria)
- (Honduras) Júnior Izaguirre (Victoria)
- (Argentina) Sergio Diduch (Hispano)
- (Honduras) Javier Portillo (Hispano)
- (Uruguay) Marcelo Segales (Hispano)
- (Honduras) Johnny Calderón (Vida)
- (Honduras) Edgar Nuñez (Atlético Olanchano)
- (Honduras) Ramón Núñez (Olimpia)
- (Uruguay) Ramiro Bruschi (Olimpia)
- (Brazil) Carlos Días (Real España)
- (Honduras) Allan Lalín (Real España)
- (Honduras) Carlos Will Mejía (Platense)
- (Honduras) Bani Lozano (Platense)

2 goals

- (Honduras) Elmer Marín (Atlético Olanchano)
- (Honduras) Henry Córdoba (Platense)
- (Honduras) Mario Berríos (Marathón)
- (Honduras) Carlos Oliva (Marathón)
- (Honduras) Astor Henríquez (Marathón)
- (Brazil) Eberso Amaral (Marathón)
- (Honduras) Rigoberto Padilla (Hispano)
- (Honduras) Milton Ruíz (Hispano)
- (Honduras) Avidán Solís (Victoria)
- (Honduras) Luis Rodas (Motagua)
- (Honduras) Fernando Castillo (Motagua)
- (Honduras) Víctor Bernárdez (Motagua)
- (Honduras) Rubén Matamoros (Motagua)
- (Honduras) Elkin González (Real España)
- (Honduras) Erick Vallecillo (Real España)
- (Honduras) Mario César Rodríguez (Real España)
- (Brazil) Allan Kardeck (Olimpia)
- (Honduras) Carlos Alberto Salinas (Atlético Olanchano)
- (Uruguay) Richard Pérez (Atlético Olanchano)
- (Honduras) Dicktmar Hernández (Vida)
- (Honduras) José Luis Grant (Vida)
- (Honduras) Lenín Suárez (Deportes Savio)

1 goal

- (Argentina) José Regalado (Hispano)
- (Honduras) Jairo Mosquera (Hispano)
- (Honduras) Leonardo Morales (Hispano)
- (Honduras) Eliu Membreño (Hispano)
- (Honduras) Leonardo Isaula (Hispano)
- (Honduras) Samir Arzú (Atlético Olanchano)
- (Honduras) Wilmer Ramos (Atlético Olanchano)
- (Honduras) José Mario Navarro (Atlético Olanchano)
- (Honduras) José Valladares (Motagua)
- (Honduras) Emilio Izaguirre (Motagua)
- (Honduras) Amado Guevara (Motagua)
- (Honduras) Misael Ruíz (Platense)
- (Honduras) Adán Ramírez (Platense)
- (Honduras) Erick Norales (Marathón)
- (Honduras) Emil Martínez (Marathón)
- (Brazil) Nilberto da Silva (Marathón)
- (Honduras) Óscar Bonilla (Marathón)
- (Honduras) Reinieri Mayorquín (Marathón)
- (Honduras) Oscar Vargas (Marathón)
- (Brazil) Edilson Pereira (Deportes Savio)
- (Belize) Harrison Róchez (Deportes Savio)
- (Honduras) Onán García (Deportes Savio)
- (Honduras) Víctor Ramírez (Deportes Savio)
- (Argentina) Juliano de Andrade (Deportes Savio)
- (Honduras) Carlos Morán (Victoria)
- (Honduras) Juan Pablo Montes (Victoria)
- (Uruguay) Mauricio Weber (Victoria)
- (Honduras) Derrick Hulse (Victoria)
- (Honduras) Ninrrol Medina (Victoria)
- (Brazil) Carin Adipe (Victoria)
- (Honduras) Wilmer Crisanto (Victoria)
- (Honduras) Héctor Flores (Real España)
- (Honduras) Nery Medina (Real España)
- (Brazil) Carlos Fretes (Real España)
- (Honduras) Elder Valladares (Real España)
- (Brazil) Everaldo Ferreira (Real España)ç
- (Honduras) Nahún Ávila (Olimpia)
- (Honduras) Sergio Mendoza (Olimpia)
- (Honduras) Erick Andino (Olimpia)
- (Honduras) Carlos Discua (Olimpia)
- (Honduras) Boniek García (Olimpia)
- (Honduras) Juan Manuel Cárcamo (Olimpia)
- (Honduras) Hendry Thomas (Olimpia)
- (Honduras) Milton Núñez (Olimpia)
- (Honduras) Jerry Bengtson (Vida)
- (Honduras) Modesto Rodas (Vida)
- (Honduras) Angel Hill (Vida)

== Aggregate table ==
Atlético Olanchano made the fewest points in the aggregated table from both Apertura and Clausura regular seasons, thereby were relegated to the Liga de Ascenso.

Pos	Team	Pld	W	D	L	GF	GA	GD	Pts	Qualification or relegation
1	Marathón	36	19	8	9	57	39	+18	65	Qualified to the 2008–09 CONCACAF Champions League
2	Olimpia	36	15	15	6	47	26	+21	60	Qualified to the 2008–09 CONCACAF Champions League
3	Motagua	36	17	8	11	51	38	+13	59	
4	Victoria	36	13	16	7	39	29	+10	55	
5	Real España	36	14	8	14	48	47	+1	50	
6	Hispano	36	12	11	13	43	47	−4	47	
7	Deportes Savio	36	9	14	13	32	39	−7	41	
8	Vida	36	8	14	14	36	51	−15	38	
9	Platense	36	8	11	17	35	52	−17	35	
10	Atlético Olanchano	36	9	7	20	34	54	−20	34	Relegated to the 2008–09 Liga de Ascenso

Updated to match(es) played on 3 May 2008. Source:
