= List of foreign Honduran Liga Nacional players =

This is a list of foreign players in Honduran Liga Nacional. The following players:

1. have played at least one official game for their respective clubs.
2. are listed as squad members for the current .
3. have not been capped for the Honduras national team at any level.
4. includes uncapped players with dual nationality.

In italic: Players currently signed, but have yet to play a league match.

In Bold: Current foreign Primera División de Fútbol Profesional. players and their present team.

== Naturalised Players ==
- (Brazil) (Honduras) Denilson Costa - Olimpia, Motagua
- (Brazil) (Honduras) Marcelo Ferreira - Platense
- (Uruguay) (Honduras) Vicente Daniel Viera - Olimpia, Motagua
- (Ghana) (Honduras) Wisdom Quaye - Vida, Real España, Victoria

== South America (CONMEBOL) ==
=== Argentina ===
- Héctor Amarilla - Marathon
- Juliano de Andrade - Deportes Savio
- Santiago Autino - Valencia
- Lucas Baldunciel - Motagua
- Pablo Bocco - Motagua
- Marcelo Cabecao - Hispano
- Lucas Campana - Marathon
- Fabian Castillo - Platense
- Fabián Cuneo - Vida
- Sergio Diduch - Real Espana, Hispano, Motagua
- Hugo Domínguez - Motagua
- Leonardo Domínguez - Victoria
- Mariano Echeverría - Valencia
- Marcelo Estigarribia - Motagua
- Miguel Farrera - Platense
- Julián Fernández - Real España
- Emiliano Forgione - Platense
- Gustavo Fuentes - Platense, Marathon, Motagua
- Matías Galvaliz - Motagua
- Walter García - Olimpia
- Pablo Genovese - Marathon, Hispano, Vida
- Lucas Gómez - Motagua
- Nicolás del Greco - Olimpia
- Leandro Guaita - Victoria, Vida
- Néstor Holweber - Motagua
- Kevin Hoyos - Victoria
- Pablo Iglesias - Platense
- Álvaro Klusener - Platense
- Ariel Leyes - Motagua, Marathon
- Maximiliano Lombardi - Motagua
- Mariano Lutzky - Vida
- Federico Maya - Platense
- German Mayenfisch - Motagua
- Pablo Medina - Platense
- Santiago Minella - Deportes Savio
- Braian Molina - Marathon
- Héctor Gabriel Morales - Victoria
- Alejandro Naif - Victoria
- José Pacini - Motagua, Marathon, Real Espana, Vida, Victoria, Pumas UNAH
- Maximiliano Osurak - Platense
- Fernando Pasquinelli - Motagua
- Christian Pereira - Platense
- Sebastián Portigliatti - Motagua, Juticalpa
- Juliano Rangel - Deportes Savio
- Fernando Regules - Marathon
- Juan Rial - Marathón
- Francisco Del Riego - Platense
- Ramiro Rocca - Real Espana
- Mario Antonio Romero - Platense
- Diego de Rosa - Olimpia
- Ricardo Rosales - Motagua
- Sebastián Rosano - Olimpia
- Jonathan Rougier - Motagua
- Gustavo Scioscia - Platense
- Eduardo Sosa - Motagua
- Franco Tisera - Victoria
- Danilo Tosello - Olimpia
- Luciano Ursino - Real España
- José Varela - Motagua
- Diego Vásquez - Motagua
- Pablo Vásquez - Olimpia
- Willian Veloso - Platense
- Santiago Vergara - Motagua
- Marcelo Verón - Platense
- Juan Vieyra - Marathon
- Juan Yalet - Marathon
- Domingo Zalazar - Real Espana
- Juan Manuel Zandoná - Marathon

=== Brazil ===
- Carin Adipe - Victoria
- Eberson Amaral - Marathon
- Ronaldo Barbosa - Vida
- Sergio Barbosa - Juticalpa FC
- Rafael Betine - Real Espana
- Wesley Braz - Marathón
- Marcelo Cabrita - Platense
- Douglas Caetano - Real Espana, Olimpia, Juticalpa
- Julio Cesar - Marathon
- Samuel Córdova - Victoria
- Ricardo Correia - Marathon
- Ney Costa - Deportes Savio
- Carlos Dias - Olimpia
- Luciano Emilio - Real Espana, Olimpia
- Caue Fernandes - Marathon
- Diogo Fernandes - Motagua, Victoria
- Everaldo Ferreira - Olimpia, Real Espana, Atletico Choloma
- Patryck Ferreira - Vida
- Carlos Fretes - Real España
- Moacyr Filho - Necaxa, Hispano, Platense
- Jonatan Hansen - Real Espana,
- Allan Kardeck - Olimpia
- Marcelo Lopes - Platense
- Silvian López - Marathon
- Douglas Mattoso - Real Espana
- Josimar Moreira - Parrillas One
- Jocimar Nascimento - Olimpia, Vida, Deportes Savio, Motagua
- Charles de Oliveira - Atlético Olanchano
- Edilson Pereira - Deportes Savio, Platense, Marathon
- Matheus Santos Pinto - Real Sociedad
- Romário Pinto - Deportes Savio, Marathon
- Fábio Prates - Deportes Savio
- Bruno Rego - Victoria
- Jean Carles Rosario - Marathon
- Mauricio Sabillón - Marathon
- Pedro Santana - Real España, Motagua
- Allan do Santos - Olimpia
- Cristiano dos Santos - Olimpia
- Marcelo dos Santos - Jaruense, Platense, Motagua
- Espedito Serafín - Honduras Progreso
- Bruno da Silva - Victoria
- Edmilson da Silva - Marathon
- Nilberto da Silva - Marathon
- Israel Silva - Motagua, Marathon
- Lisandro Silva - Marathon
- Marcelo Souza - Deportes Savio
- Fábio de Souza - Olimpia, Victoria
- Francisco Soares de Souza - Motagua

=== Chile ===
- Claudio Chavarría - Universidad (2003), Municipal Valencia (2005), Broncos UNAH (2006–07)
- Arturo Díaz - Atlético Indio (1968), Federal (197?)
- Jorge Garcés - Real España (1977–79)
- Hernán Godoy - Motagua (1970)
- Mario Iubini - Motagua (1978, 1981), Olimpia (1979, 1982)
- Marcos Morales - Génesis (2023)
- Héctor Olivos - Real España (1979)
- Eduardo Quintanilla - Motagua (197?), Olimpia (197?)
- Rubén Rodríguez-Peña - Platense (1974–75, 1978), Real España (1975–77)
- **Carlos Ross** - Platense (2017)
- Manuel Soto - Real España (1976–77)
- Julio Tapia - Real España (1976–81), Atlético Morazán (1981–82), Marathón (1982–83)
- Marcos Velásquez - Vida (2022)
- Alfonso Zamora - Platense (1969–70), Real España (1976–7?)

=== Colombia ===
- Mario Abadia - Honduras Progreso, Platense
- Rafael Agámez - Vida
- Camilo Aguirre - Real España
- Eder Arias - Platense
- Justin Arboleda - Marathon
- Yustin Arboleda Buenaños - Olimpia
- Juan Bolaños - Platense
- James Cabezas - Juticalpa
- Robert Campaz - Platense
- Luis Castro - Platense, Vida
- Mauricio Copete - Victoria, Olimpia, Motagua, Parrillas One
- Charles Córdoba - Motagua, Necaxa, Marathon, Parrillas One, Juticalpa, Atletico Choloma, Vida, Real Juventud
- Jaime Córdoba - Olimpia
- Santiago Córdoba - Marathon
- Javier Estupinan - Platense, Parillas One, Olimpia, Motagua
- Reynaldo Castro Gil - Honduras Progreso
- Omar Guerra - Olimpia
- Luis Orlando Hurtado - Victoria
- Steven Jiménez - Victoria
- Edward Klinger - Honduras Progreso
- Jhovani Lasso - Deportes Savio
- Luis López - Platense
- Geovani Mina - Deportes Savio
- Éder Munive - Marathón
- Oidel Perez - Honduras Progreso
- Oscar Piedrahita - Honduras Progreso
- Andres Quejada - Olimpia
- Roberto Riascos - Real Sociedad, Vida, Social Sol
- Andres Salazar - Honduras Progreso
- Harold Yépez - Atlético Olanchano
- William Zapata - Marathón

=== Ecuador ===
- Richard Mercado - Honduras Progreso

=== Paraguay ===
- Alfredo Cristino Jara - Marathon
- Roberto Moreira - Motagua
- Miguel Ángel Payba - Honduras Progreso
- César Velásquez - Olimpia

=== Peru ===
- Carlos Izquierdo Sánchez - Broncos (1974–1976)
- Mario Antonio Lobaton - Motagua
- Miguel Seminario - Motagua (1991–1992), Real Maya (1992), Atlético Indio (1993)
- David Wendell - Motagua (1995–1996)
- José Vasquez - Olimpia (1989)
- Manuel Lobatón - Motagua
- Alfred Saavedra - Petrotela (1994)
- Luis Salas - Petrotela (1994)
- Jose Espinoza - Pumas UNAH (2000)
- Renzo Gonzáles - Motagua (2000)
- Javier Lovera - Motagua (1988)
- Custodio Vargas - Broncos
- Carlos Alberto Delgado - Real España
- Cesar Dinegro - Motagua
- José Suárez - Real España (1989)
- Fabritzio Ruiz - Club San Juan (2021)

=== Uruguay ===
- Luis Ramon Abdeneve - Olimpia
- Héctor Acuña - Marathon
- Christian Alba - Vida
- Sergio Bica - Real Espana, Marathon
- Ramiro Bruschi - Olimpia, Real Espana
- Nicolas Cardozo - Real Espana, Marathon, Atlético Olanchano, Vida
- Juan Carlos Contreras - Olimpia, Motagua
- Marcelo Dapuerto - Motagua
- Fernando Garrasino - Motagua
- Christian Gutiérrez - Real España
- Mario Leguizamón - Olimpia
- Kerpo de León - Hispano, Platense, Vida, Motagua
- Robert Lima - Olimpia
- Máximo Lucas - Marathon
- Marcelo Macías - Real Espana
- Luis Maldonado - Platense, Marathon
- Richard Pérez - Vida
- Juan Obelar - Marathon
- Carlos Ramírez - Social Sol
- Jorge Ramírez - Real Espana
- Julio Pablo Rodríguez - Real Espana
- Richard Rodriguez - Vida
- Marcelo Segales - Marathon
- Diego Emilio Silva - Marathon
- Edgardo Simovic - Marathon
- Jonathan Techera - Marathon
- Óscar Torlacoff - Broncos UNAH, Motagua, Hispano, Atlético Choloma
- Mauricio Weber - Victoria

=== Venezuela ===
- Giancarlo Maldonaldo - Real Espana

== North & Central America, Caribbean (CONCACAF) ==
=== Belize ===
- Carlos Bernárdez - Real Espana
- Elroy Kuylen - Platense
- Deon McCaulay - Deportes Savio
- Shane Orio - Marathon
- Harrison Rochez - Deportes Savio, Platense, Marathon, Nexaca
- Elroy Smith - Deportes Savio, Platense, Marathon, Vida
- Woodrow West - Honduras Progreso

=== Costa Rica ===
- Allan Alemán - Real Espana
- Steven Bryce - Marathon
- Andy Furtado - Marathon
- Víctor Núñez - Real España
- Heyreel Saravia - Real España
- Erick Scott - Marathon
- Roy Smith - Honduras Progreso, Marathon
- Omar Sumbado- Honduras Progreso

=== Cuba ===
- Nelson Johnston - Real Sociedad
- Yaudel Lahera - Marathon, Victoria

=== El Salvador ===
- Salvador Azcunaga - San Pedro
- Lester Blanco - Real Espana, Marathon
- Diego Mejía - Motagua
- Chepe Leon Najarro - Honduras Progreso
- Fredy Orellana - Broncos de Choluteca, Universidad de Tegucigalpa
- Elmer Rosa- Broncos de Choluteca, Universidad de Tegucigalpa
- Luis Ramirez Zapata - Platense
- Herbert Quevedo - Platense

=== Grenada ===
- Jamal Charles - Vida, Real Sociedad

=== Guatemala ===
- Wilmer García - Juticalpa
- Guillermo Ramírez - Marathon, Motagua
- Gerson Tinoco - Juticalpa

=== Haiti ===
- Rudy Lormera - Universidad

=== Mexico ===
- Juan Carlos García - Marathón
- Omar Rosas - Real Espana
- Carlos Peña - Vida

=== Nicaragua ===
- José María Bermúdez - Real Maya
- Mauricio Cruz - Pumas UNAH
- Salvador Dubois - Motagua
- Denver Fox - Real Sociedad
- Roger Mayorga - Motagua, UNAH, Marathón, Super Estrella de Danli
- Otoniel Olivas - Atletico Indio
- Samuel Wilson - Atletico Olanchano
- Víctor Webster - Motagua

=== Panama ===
- Richard Dixon - Platense
- Donaldo González - Olimpia
- Brunet Hay - Platense
- Leslie Heraldez - Honduras Progreso
- Angel Hill - Marathon
- Omar Jaén - Real Espana
- Ricardo James - Platense
- Luis Jaramillo - Victoria, Vida
- José Justavino - Motagua
- Cesar Medina - Olimpia
- Manuel Mosquera - Victoria
- Luis Ovalle - Olimpia
- José Anthony Torres - Platense
- Alberto Zapata - Valencia

=== Saint Kitts and Nevis ===
- Julani Archibald - Real de Minas

=== Saint Lucia ===
- Malik St. Prix - Vida

=== Trinidad and Tobago ===
- Jamille Boatswain - Honduras Progreso
- Jerrell Britto - Honduras Progreso
- Daniel Cyrus - Juticalpa
- André Ettienne - Honduras Progreso
- Akeem Roach - Vida, Real Sociedad
- Jan-Michael Williams - Juticalpa
- Rundell Winchester - Platense

== Africa(AFC) ==
=== Mali ===
- Mamadou Traoré - Platense

=== Sierra Leone ===
- Abdul Thompson - Motagua

=== Zambia ===
- Joseph Katongo - Motagua

== Europe (UEFA) ==
=== England ===
- Daniel Reebok - Vida

=== Russia ===
- Evgeni Kabaev - Real de Minas

=== Spain ===
- Victor Blasco - Vida
- Pablo Rodriguez - Marathon
- David Sierra - Victoria
