= 2006–07 Honduran Liga Nacional =

Liga Nacional
- Season: 2006–07
- Champions: Apertura: Motagua; Clausura: Real España
- Relegated: Broncos UNAH
- UNCAF Interclub Cup: Motagua; Real España; Olimpia

The 2006–07 Honduran Liga Nacional was the 42nd edition of the Honduran top division. C.D. Motagua and Real C.D. España won the Apertura and Clausura tournaments respectively.

== 2006–07 teams ==
- Atlético Olanchano (Catacamas) (promoted)
- Broncos UNAH (Choluteca)
- Hispano (Comayagua)
- Marathón (San Pedro Sula)
- Motagua (Tegucigalpa)
- Olimpia (Tegucigalpa)
- Platense (Puerto Cortés)
- Real España (San Pedro Sula)
- Victoria (La Ceiba)
- Vida (La Ceiba)

== Apertura ==
The Apertura tournament for the 2006–07 season started on 12 August 2006 with the 2–1 Club Deportivo Olimpia's away victory over C.D. Victoria at the Estadio Nilmo Edwards. C.D. Motagua as Apertura winners qualified to the 2007 UNCAF Interclub Cup.

=== Regular season ===
==== Standings ====
| Pos | Team | Pld | W | D | L | GF | GA | GD | Pts | Qualification or relegation |
|---|---|---|---|---|---|---|---|---|---|---|
| 1 | Olimpia | 18 | 10 | 5 | 3 | 26 | 14 | +12 | 35 | Qualified to the Final round |
| 2 | Motagua | 18 | 9 | 4 | 5 | 27 | 22 | +5 | 31 | Qualified to the Final round |
| 3 | Hispano | 18 | 7 | 9 | 2 | 25 | 14 | +11 | 30 | Qualified to the Final round |
| 4 | Marathón | 18 | 8 | 6 | 4 | 30 | 20 | +10 | 30 | Qualified to the Final round |
| 5 | Platense | 18 | 7 | 8 | 3 | 32 | 29 | +3 | 29 | |
| 6 | Atlético Olanchano | 18 | 6 | 5 | 7 | 24 | 25 | −1 | 23 | |
| 7 | Real España | 18 | 5 | 6 | 7 | 18 | 20 | −2 | 21 | |
| 8 | Victoria | 18 | 5 | 4 | 9 | 21 | 28 | −7 | 19 | |
| 9 | Broncos UNAH | 18 | 3 | 5 | 10 | 17 | 26 | −9 | 14 | |
| 10 | Vida | 18 | 3 | 2 | 13 | 17 | 39 | −22 | 11 | |

Updated to match(es) played on 26 November 2006. Source:

==== Results ====
As of 26 November 2006

| Home \ Away | OLA | BUN | HIS | MAR | MOT | OLI | PLA | RES | VIC | VID |
|---|---|---|---|---|---|---|---|---|---|---|
| Atlético Olanchano | | 2–1 | 1–1 | 0–3 | 3–0 | 0–2 | 2–2 | 3–2 | 2–2 | 3–1 |
| Broncos UNAH | 1–2 | | 0–0 | 0–1 | 3–5 | 1–0 | 0–0 | 1–0 | 1–1 | 1–1 |
| Hispano | 0–0 | 3–1 | | 2–0 | 0–0 | 0–2 | 0–0 | 2–1 | 5–0 | 3–1 |
| Marathón | 0–1 | 2–1 | 1–1 | | 4–0 | 2–3 | 4–1 | 0–0 | 2–2 | 1–0 |
| Motagua | 1–0 | 1–0 | 2–0 | 3–0 | | 2–2 | 1–3 | 2–0 | 2–1 | 2–0 |
| Olimpia | 1–0 | 1–1 | 1–1 | 0–0 | 2–1 | | 0–2 | 1–0 | 1–2 | 1–0 |
| Platense | 2–2 | 4–3 | 2–2 | 2–2 | 2–1 | 0–3 | | 3–2 | 1–0 | 3–1 |
| Real España | 1–0 | 1–0 | 0–0 | 2–2 | 1–1 | 0–0 | 2–2 | | 2–1 | 2–0 |
| Victoria | 2–1 | 1–2 | 1–2 | 0–1 | 1–1 | 1–2 | 2–1 | 0–1 | | 2–0 |
| Vida | 3–2 | 1–0 | 1–3 | 2–5 | 0–2 | 1–4 | 2–2 | 1–0 | 1–2 | |

Source: Soccerway
Legend: Blue = home team win; Yellow = draw; Red = away team win.

=== Final round ===
==== Semifinals ====
===== Olimpia vs Marathón =====
| 2 December 2006 1st leg | Marathón | 2–1 | Olimpia | San Pedro Sula, Cortés |
| 19:30 (UTC−06:00) | Martínez 23'; Segales 79' | Report | Emílio 36' | Stadium: Estadio Olímpico Metropolitano; Referee: Henry Ramírez |

| 6 December 2006 2nd leg | Olimpia | 2–0 | Marathón | Tegucigalpa, Francisco Morazán |
| 19:30 (UTC−06:00) | Palacios 36'; Arévalo 58' | Report | | Stadium: Estadio Tiburcio Carías Andino; Attendance: 12,144; Referee: Mario Moncada |

- Olimpia won 3–2 on aggregate score.

===== Motagua vs Hispano =====
| 2 December 2006 1st leg | Hispano | 2–1 | Motagua | Comayagua, Comayagua |
| 16:00 (UTC−06:00) | Diduch 24'; Castro 86' | Report | Santana 28' | Stadium: Estadio Carlos Miranda; Attendance: 6,928; Referee: Marcio Carranza |

| 7 December 2006 2nd leg | Motagua | 5–0 | Hispano | Tegucigalpa, Francisco Morazán |
| 19:30 (UTC−06:00) | Martínez 12' 31'; Torlacoff 23'; Guzmán 36'; Santana 85' (pen.) | Report | | Stadium: Estadio Tiburcio Carías Andino; Attendance: 13,365; Referee: Ricardo Zelaya |

- Motagua won 6–2 on aggregate score.

==== Final ====
===== Olimpia vs Motagua =====
| 10 December 2006 1st leg | Motagua | 1–1 | Olimpia | Tegucigalpa, Francisco Morazán |
| 16:00 (UTC−06:00) | Bernárdez 13' | Report | Velásquez 11' | Stadium: Estadio Tiburcio Carías Andino; Attendance: 32,055; Referee: Ricardo Zelaya |

| 17 December 2006 2nd leg | Olimpia | 1–3 | Motagua | San Pedro Sula, Cortés |
| 16:00 (UTC−06:00) | Figueroa 21' | Report | Bernárdez 40'; Nascimento 56'; Guzmán 90+1' | Stadium: Estadio Olímpico Metropolitano; Attendance: 38,256; Referee: Mario Moncada |

| Olimpia | Motagua |

| GK | – | (Honduras) Donis Escober |
| RB | – | (Honduras) Edwin Ávila |
| CB | 5 | (Honduras) Milton Palacios |
| CB | – | (Honduras) Rony Morales | (substituted off) 68' |
| LB | 3 | (Honduras) Maynor Figueroa | (substituted off) 48' |
| RM | – | (Honduras) Franklin Arévalo |
| CM | 8 | (Honduras) Wilson Palacios |
| CM | 14 | (Honduras) Wilfredo Barahona |
| LM | 32 | (Honduras) Boniek García |
| CF | 11 | (Honduras) Wilmer Velásquez |
| CF | 19 | (Brazil) Luciano Emílio | (substituted off) 75' |
Substitutions:
| MF | – | (Argentina) Juan Yalet | (substituted on) 63' |
| FW | 9 | (Honduras) Juan Manuel Cárcamo | (substituted on) 67' |
| FW | – | (Honduras) Jerry Palacios | (substituted on) 78' |
Manager:
(Brazil) Flavio Ortega

| GK | 1 | (Honduras) Ricardo Canales |
| RB | – | (Honduras) Límber Pérez |
| CB | – | (Honduras) Javier Martínez |
| CB | 24 | (Honduras) Víctor Bernárdez |
| LB | – | (Honduras) Emilio Izaguirre |
| CM | – | (Honduras) Rubén Matamoros | (substituted off) 34' |
| CM | 17 | (Honduras) Víctor Mena |
| CM | 32 | (Honduras) Jorge Claros |
| AM | 23 | (Brazil) Pedro Santana |
| CF | 9 | (Honduras) Jairo Martínez | (substituted off) 61' |
| CF | 10 | (Brazil) Jocimar Nascimento |
Substitutions:
| MF | – | (Honduras) Luis Guzmán | (substituted on) 34' |
Manager:
(Honduras) Ramón Maradiaga

- Motagua won 4–2 on aggregate score.

2006–07 Apertura champion

11th title

=== Awards ===
- Champion:
  Motagua
  Awarded 360,000 Lempiras
- Sub Champion:
  Olimpia
  Awarded 155,000 Lempiras
- Fair Play:
  Broncos UNAH
  Awarded 50,000 Lempiras
- Top Goal Scorer:
  Carlo Costly
  Awarded 30,000 Lempiras
- Best Goalkeeper:
  Ricardo Canales
  Awarded 30,000 Lempiras
- Most Valuable Player:

Awarded 30,000 Lempiras

- Rookie of the year:
  Henry Bermúdez
  Awarded 30,000 Lempiras

=== Records ===
- Highest fee paid:
  Motagua–Olimpia
  17 December
  Estadio Olimpico, San Pedro Sula
  38,256 fans
  4,528,020 lempiras
- Highest Assistance:
  Motagua–Olimpia
  17 December
  Estadio Olimpico, San Pedro Sula
  38,256 fans
  4,528,020 lempiras
- Lowest fee paid:
- Lowest Assistance:

=== Top goalscorers ===
As of 17 December 2006

| R | Player | Club | GS |
|---|---|---|---|
| 1 | (Honduras) Carlo Costly | Platense | 10 |
| 2 | (Honduras) Wilmer Velásquez | Olimpia | 9 |
| 2 | (Honduras) Walter Martínez | Marathón | 9 |
| 4 | (Honduras) Emil Martínez | Marathón | 8 |
| 4 | (Honduras) Jairo Martínez | Motagua | 8 |
| 4 | (Brazil) Pedro Santana | Motagua | 8 |
| 7 | (Honduras) Wilson Palacios | Olimpia | 7 |
| 7 | (Honduras) Héctor Flores | Victoria | 7 |
| 9 | (Brazil) Marcelo Ferreira | Atlético Olanchano | 6 |
| 9 | (Honduras) Henry Hernández | Vida | 6 |
| 9 | (Brazil) Jocimar Nascimento | Motagua | 6 |

== Clausura ==
Honduras Clausura 2006-07 is the closing season of Liga Nacional de Honduras, the first division national football league in Honduras. It followed the 2006–07 Honduras Apertura season. This is tournament # 50 of Liga Nacional de Honduras. The winner qualified for the 2007 UNCAF Club Tournament. It started January 13 and ended on 19 May.

=== Regular season ===
==== Standings ====
| Pos | Team | Pld | W | D | L | GF | GA | GD | Pts | Qualification or relegation |
|---|---|---|---|---|---|---|---|---|---|---|
| 1 | Real España | 18 | 11 | 4 | 3 | 27 | 10 | +17 | 37 | Qualified to the Final round (Note: Top 4 qualify to the Final round.) |
| 2 | Marathón | 18 | 11 | 3 | 4 | 32 | 16 | +16 | 36 | Qualified to the Final round |
| 3 | Olimpia | 18 | 11 | 3 | 4 | 26 | 12 | +14 | 36 | Qualified to the Final round |
| 4 | Motagua | 18 | 10 | 1 | 7 | 31 | 26 | +5 | 31 | Qualified to the Final round |
| 5 | Hispano | 18 | 6 | 5 | 7 | 21 | 19 | +2 | 23 | |
| 6 | Platense | 17 | 7 | 2 | 8 | 17 | 22 | −5 | 23 (Note: The matches Platense vs Broncos UNAH and Victoria vs Atlético Olanchano from Round 18 were not played due to lack of interest.) | |
| 7 | Vida | 18 | 6 | 4 | 8 | 21 | 23 | −2 | 22 | |
| 8 | Atlético Olanchano | 17 | 5 | 3 | 9 | 16 | 23 | −7 | 18 | |
| 9 | Victoria | 17 | 3 | 5 | 9 | 14 | 22 | −8 | 14 | |
| 10 | Broncos UNAH | 17 | 0 | 6 | 11 | 7 | 39 | −32 | 6 | |

Updated to match(es) played on 29 April 2007. Source:

==== Results ====
As of 29 April 2007

| Home \ Away | OLA | BUN | HIS | MAR | MOT | OLI | PLA | RES | VIC | VID |
|---|---|---|---|---|---|---|---|---|---|---|
| Atlético Olanchano | | 5–2 | 2–0 | 1–0 | 1–2 | 0–2 | 2–1 | 0–0 | 2–0 | 1–3 |
| Broncos UNAH | 0–0 | | 0–0 | 1–3 | 1–4 | 0–3 | 0–0 | 0–2 | 0–0 | 0–0 |
| Hispano | 2–0 | 5–1 | | 1–1 | 3–1 | 1–1 | 0–1 | 3–1 | 2–1 | 1–1 |
| Marathón | 2–0 | 3–1 | 2–0 | | 0–1 | 2–0 | 2–0 | 1–1 | 4–2 | 3–0 |
| Motagua | 5–1 | 1–0 | 0–1 | 3–4 | | 0–4 | 2–2 | 0–1 | 1–0 | 3–2 |
| Olimpia | 1–0 | 4–0 | 1–1 | 0–1 | 1–2 | | 2–1 | 0–2 | 2–1 | 2–1 |
| Platense | 2–1 | – (Note: The matches Platense vs Broncos UNAH and Victoria vs Atlético Olanchano from Round 18 were not played due to lack of interest.) | 2–0 | 3–2 | 0–3 | 0–1 | | 1–0 | 2–1 | 1–2 |
| Real España | 1–0 | 5–0 | 1–0 | 1–0 | 2–1 | 0–1 | 3–0 | | 2–0 | 2–2 |
| Victoria | – | 1–1 | 2–1 | 0–0 | 2–0 | 0–0 | 0–1 | 1–1 | | 2–1 |
| Vida | 0–0 | 3–0 | 1–0 | 1–2 | 1–2 | 0–1 | 1–0 | 0–2 | 2–1 | |

Source: Soccerway
Legend: Blue = home team win; Yellow = draw; Red = away team win.

=== Final round ===
==== Semifinals ====
===== Real España vs Motagua =====
| 2 May 2007 1st leg | Motagua | 1–3 | Real España | Tegucigalpa, Francisco Morazán |
| 19:30 (UTC−06:00) | Santana 66' (pen.) | Report | Pavón 12' 33' (pen.) 59' | Stadium: Estadio Tiburcio Carías Andino; Attendance: 10,634; Referee: Benigno Pineda |

| 5 May 2007 2nd leg | Real España | 1–0 | Motagua | San Pedro Sula, Cortés |
| 19:30 (UTC−06:00) | Pavón 17' (pen.) | Report | | Stadium: Estadio Francisco Morazán; Attendance: 8,899; Referee: Mario Moncada |

- Real España won 4–1 on aggregate score.

===== Marathón vs Olimpia =====
| 3 May 2007 1st leg | Olimpia | 2–0 | Marathón | Tegucigalpa, Francisco Morazán |
| 19:30 (UTC−06:00) | Pacini 43'; Henríquez 64' (pen.) | Report | | Stadium: Estadio Tiburcio Carías Andino; Attendance: 12,153; Referee: José Sandoval |

| 6 May 2007 2nd leg | Marathón | 2–0 (3–0 p) | Olimpia | San Pedro Sula, Cortés |
| 16:00 (UTC−06:00) | Martínez 2'; Santamaría 77' | Report | | Stadium: Estadio Olímpico Metropolitano; Attendance: 13,799; Referee: Óscar Bardales |
| | Penalties |
| | Martínez (penalty scored); Scott (penalty scored); Bryce (penalty scored) | | Palacios (penalty missed); Morales (penalty missed); Thomas (penalty missed) |

- Marathón 2–2 Olimpia on aggregate score; Marathón won 3–0 on penalty shootouts.

==== Final ====
===== Real España vs Marathón =====
| 13 May 2007 1st leg | Marathón | 2–1 | Real España | San Pedro Sula, Cortés |
| (UTC−06:00) | Bryce 41'; Segales 62' | Report | Pavón 35' | Stadium: Estadio Olímpico Metropolitano; Attendance: 16,809; Referee: Mario Moncada |

| 19 May 2007 2nd leg | Real España | 3–1 | Marathón | San Pedro Sula, Cortés |
| 19:30 (UTC−06:00) | Pavón 48'; Núñez 78'; Ferreira 83' | Report | Martínez 74' | Stadium: Estadio Francisco Morazán; Attendance: 19,661; Referee: Benigno Pineda |

| Real España | Marathón |

| GK | – | (Honduras) Orlin Vallecillo |
| RB | – | (Honduras) Elder Valladares |
| CB | – | (Honduras) Marlon Peña | (substituted off) 75' |
| CB | – | (Honduras) Erick Vallecillo |
| LB | 5 | (Honduras) Nery Medina |
| RM | – | (Honduras) Elkin González |
| CM | – | (Honduras) Mario Rodríguez |
| CM | – | (Honduras) Luis Guifarro | Yellow card |
| LM | – | (Brazil) José Carlos Díaz | Yellow card | (substituted off) 85' |
| SS | – | (Honduras) Melvin Valladares | (substituted off) 46' |
| CF | 9 | (Honduras) Carlos Pavón | Yellow card |
Substitutions:
| FW | – | (Brazil) Everaldo Ferreira | (substituted on) 46' |
| FW | – | (Honduras) Milton Núñez | (substituted on) 75' |
| MF | – | (Argentina) Miguel Farrera | (substituted on) 85' |
Manager:
(Mexico) José Treviño

| GK | 27 | (Uruguay) Juan Obelar |
| CB | – | (Honduras) Luis Santamaría | Yellow card |
| CB | 5 | (Honduras) Erick Norales |
| CB | 4 | (Honduras) Júnior Izaguirre | Yellow card | (substituted off) 60' |
| RWB | 23 | (Honduras) Mauricio Sabillón |
| LWB | 6 | (Honduras) Juan Carlos García |
| CM | – | (Honduras) Astor Henríquez |
| CM | 13 | (Honduras) Dennis Ferrera | (substituted off) 68' |
| AM | 7 | (Honduras) Emil Martínez |
| CF | – | (Costa Rica) Steven Bryce | (substituted off) 85' |
| CF | – | (Costa Rica) Erick Scott |
Substitutions:
| FW | 11 | (Uruguay) Marcelo Segales | (substituted on) 60' | Yellow card |
| MF | 8 | (Honduras) Carlos Oliva | (substituted on) 68' |
| FW | – | (Honduras) Luis López | (substituted on) 85' |
Manager:
(Honduras) Jorge Pineda

- Real España won 4–3 on aggregate score.

2006–07 Clausura champion

9th title

=== Top goalscorers ===
As of 19 May 2007

| R | Player | Club | GS |
|---|---|---|---|
| 1 | (Honduras) Carlos Pavón | Real España | 15 |
| 2 | (Honduras) Carlos Oliva | Marathón | 9 |
| 3 | (Costa Rica) Erick Scott | Marathón | 6 |
| 3 | (Costa Rica) Steven Bryce | Marathón | 6 |
| 3 | (Honduras) Wilson Palacios | Olimpia | 6 |
| 3 | (Honduras) Wilmer Velásquez | Olimpia | 6 |
| 3 | (Brazil) Pedro Santana | Motagua | 6 |
| 8 | (Uruguay) Óscar Torlacoff | Motagua | 5 |
| 8 | (Brazil) Marcelo Ferreira | Atlético Olanchano | 5 |
| 8 | (Honduras) Mario Romero | Platense | 5 |
| 8 | (Honduras) Héctor Flores | Victoria | 5 |

=== Awards ===
- Champion:
  Real España
  Awarded 360,000 Lempiras
- Runner Up:
  Marathón
  Awarded 155,000 Lempiras
- Fair Play:
  Atlético Olanchano
  Awarded 50,000 Lempiras
- Top Goal Scorer:
  Carlos Pavón
  Awarded 30,000 Lempiras
- Best Goalkeeper:
  Orlin Vallecillo
  Awarded 30,000 Lempiras
- Most Valuable Player:
  Carlos Pavón
  Awarded 30,000 Lempiras
- Rookie of the year:
  Henry Bermúdez
  Awarded 30,000 Lempiras

== Relegation table ==
| Pos | Team | Pld | W | D | L | GF | GA | GD | Pts | Qualification or relegation |
|---|---|---|---|---|---|---|---|---|---|---|
| 1 | Olimpia | 36 | 21 | 8 | 7 | 52 | 26 | +26 | 71 | |
| 2 | Marathón | 36 | 19 | 9 | 8 | 62 | 36 | +26 | 66 | |
| 3 | Motagua | 36 | 19 | 5 | 12 | 58 | 48 | +10 | 62 | |
| 4 | Real España | 36 | 16 | 10 | 10 | 45 | 30 | +15 | 58 | |
| 5 | Hispano | 36 | 13 | 14 | 9 | 46 | 33 | +13 | 53 | |
| 6 | Platense | 35 | 14 | 10 | 11 | 49 | 51 | −2 | 52 | |
| 7 | Atlético Olanchano | 35 | 11 | 8 | 16 | 40 | 48 | −8 | 41 | |
| 8 | Victoria | 35 | 8 | 9 | 18 | 35 | 50 | −15 | 33 | |
| 9 | Vida | 36 | 9 | 6 | 21 | 38 | 62 | −24 | 33 | |
| 10 | Broncos UNAH (R) | 35 | 3 | 11 | 21 | 24 | 65 | −41 | 20 | Relegation to Second division |

Updated to match(es) played on 2007-04-29. Source:
Rules for classification: 1) points; 2) goal difference; 3) number of goals scored.
(R) Relegated

=== Promoted team ===
This team was promoted from Honduran Liga Nacional de Ascenso for the next season:

- Deportes Savio (second time in the top flight)

== Trivia ==
- The final is the second final with a clasico sampedrano, 26 years after the first.
- After seven consecutive finals, Olimpia did not participate in this tournament's final.
- This is tournament # 50 of Liga Nacional de Fútbol de Honduras.
