= 2005–06 Honduran Liga Nacional de Ascenso =

Liga de Ascenso
- Season: 2005–06
- Champions: Apertura: Atlético Olanchano; Clausura: Lenca
- Promoted: Atlético Olanchano
- All statistics correct as of 25 June 2006.

The 2005–06 Honduran Liga Nacional de Ascenso was the 39th season of the Second level in Honduran football and the fourth one under the name Liga Nacional de Ascenso. Under the management of Dennis Allen, Atlético Olanchano won the tournament after defeating C.D. Lenca in the promotion series and obtained promotion to the 2006–07 Honduran Liga Nacional.

== Apertura ==
=== Postseason ===
==== Final ====
2005 1st leg	Atlético Olanchano	1–0	Juticalpa Tulín	Catacamas, Olancho
				Stadium: Estadio Rubén Guifarro

2005 2nd leg	Juticalpa Tulín	1–0 (2–3 p)	Atlético Olanchano	Juticalpa, Olancho

- Juticalpa Tulín 1–1 Atlético Olanchano on aggregate. Atlético Olanchano won 3–2 on penalty kicks.

== Clausura ==
=== Postseason ===
==== Final ====
3 June 2006 1st leg	Real Juventud	0–2	Lenca	Santa Bárbara, Santa Bárbara
				Stadium: Estadio Argelio Sabillón

11 June 2006 2nd leg	Lenca	2–1	Real Juventud	El Progreso, Yoro
				Stadium: Estadio Humberto Micheletti

- Lenca won 4–1 on aggregate.

== Promotion ==
18 June 2006 1st leg	Lenca	1–0	Atlético Olanchano	El Progreso, Yoro
				Stadium: Estadio Humberto Micheletti

25 June 2006 2nd leg	Atlético Olanchano	3–1	Lenca	Catacamas, Olancho
				Stadium: Estadio Rubén Guifarro

- Atlético Olanchano won 3–2 on aggregate.
