= Edmilson (disambiguation) =

Edmílson (born 1976) is a retired Brazilian footballer.

Edmilson or Edmílson may also refer to:

- Edmilson (given name)
- Edmilson Dias de Lucena, or simply Edmilson (born 1968), Brazilian retired association footballer
- Edmílson Paulo da Silva, or simply Edmilson (born 1968), Brazilian retired association footballer
- Edmílson Gonçalves Pimenta, or simply Edmílson (born 1971), Brazilian retired association footballer
- Edmílson Barros de Souza, or simply Edmílson (born 1977), Brazilian retired association footballer
- Edmílson dos Santos Silva, or simply Edmílson (born 1982), Brazilian association footballer
- Edmílson dos Santos Carmo Júnior, or simply Edmílson (born 1987), Brazilian association footballer
- Edmilson Junior, or simply Edmilson (born 1994), Belgian association footballer
- Edmilson Marques Pardal, or simply Edmilson (born 1980), Brazilian association footballer
- Edmilson Junior (born 1994), Qatari association footballer
- Edmilson Pedro (born 1997), Angolan judoka
- Edmilson (footballer, born 2000), Bissau Guinean footballer born Edmilson Indjai Correia
