= Carlos Izquierdo =

Carlos Izquierdo may refer to:

- Carlos Izquierdo Edwards (1896-1980), Chilean farmer and politician
- Carlos Izquierdo (footballer) (born 1949), Peruvian footballer
- Carlos Izquierdo (wrestler) (born 1997), Colombian freestyle wrestler

== See also ==
- Carlos Izquierdoz (born 1988), Argentine footballer
