= Patricio Quiroz =

Chilean footballer

Personal information
- Full name: Patricio Gerardo Quiroz Kong
- Date of birth: 24 January 1980 (age 46)
- Place of birth: Tocopilla, Chile
- Position: Midfielder

Youth career
- Colo-Colo
- Deportes Iquique

Senior career*
Years	Team	Apps	(Gls)
1998–2001	Deportes Iquique		
2002–2003	Coquimbo Unido		
2003	SV Wals-Grünau		
2004	Olympia Hallein		
2004	FC Hallein 04		
2005	SV Anthering		
2006	Coquimbo Unido		
2007–2008	FC Hammerau		
2009	Trasandino		
2009–2010	SV Anthering		
2011	USV Fuschl		
2011–2014	SV Bürmoos		
2014–2016	USV Lamprechtshausen		
2016	SV Bürmoos		
- * Club domestic league appearances and goals

Patricio Gerardo Quiroz Kong (born 24 January 1980) is a Chilean former professional football midfielder who played for clubs in Chile, Australia, Austria, and Germany.

== Career ==
As a youth player, Quiroz was with the Colo-Colo youth ranks for two years before joining Deportes Iquique youth system, taking part of the first team in 1998 thanks to the coach Jorge Garcés. In 2002, he switched to Coquimbo Unido in the top division with José Sulantay as coach, with whom he developed a close friendship. In his homeland, he also had a stint with Trasandino in 2009.

He spent most of his career in minor categories of Austrian football, where he came thanks to his fellow in Coquimbo Unido, Claudio Chavarría, who had played for Borussia Dortmund II. He also had a stint with German side FC Hammerau.

In Austria, he played for clubs such as SV Wals-Grünau, SV Anthering, USV Fuschl, SV Bürmoss, USV Lamprechtshausen, among others.

== Personal life ==
His son, Gianfranco, was born in Germany and was with the Universidad Católica youth ranks before emigrating to Europe and joining Austrian club VfB Hohenems.
