= Wilmer Ramos =

Honduran footballer (born 1979)

Personal information
- Full name: Wilmer Daniel Ramos Rodríguez
- Date of birth: 1 June 1979 (age 47)
- Place of birth: Sabá, Honduras
- Position: Forward

Senior career*
Years	Team	Apps	(Gls)
2001	Deportes Savio		(4)
2002–2003	Victoria		(1)
2005–2006	Universidad		(4)
2006–2007	Atlético Olanchano		(9)
2007	Sacachispas	10	(0)
2008	Zacapa		
2008–2009	Deportes Savio		
2010	Municipal Limeño	5	(5)
2010–2011	Deportes Savio		
- * Club domestic league appearances and goals as of 2010

Wilmer Daniel Ramos Rodríguez (born June 1, 1979, in Saba, Honduras) is a Honduran professional footballer.

== Club career ==
Nicknamed el Cambio, Ramos was part of the Victoria squad that suffered relegation after the 2002–2003 season. He played in Guatemala, where he left Sacachispas in summer 2007 after failing to score a goal in 10 games and joined Zacapa.

In 2008, he joined Deportes Savio. In January 2010 he crossed the border to play for Salvadoran side Municipal Limeño. He scored 18 Honduran league goals in total.
