= 1970–71 Honduran Segunda División =

Honduran Segunda División
- Season: 1970–71
- Champions: Troya
- Promoted: Troya
- All statistics correct as of 20 June 1971.

The 1970–71 Honduran Segunda División was the fifth season of the Honduran Segunda División. Under the management of Joaquín Padilla, C.D. Troya won the tournament after defeating C.D. Lenca in the final series and obtained promotion to the 1971–72 Honduran Liga Nacional.

== Final ==
June 1971 1st leg	Lenca	5–4	Troya

20 June 1971 2nd leg	Troya	2–0	Lenca	Tegucigalpa, Francisco Morazán
				Stadium: Estadio Tiburcio Carías Andino

- Troya won 6–5 on aggregate.
