= Carlos Keosseian =

Uruguayan footballer (born 1988)

Carlos Keosseián
Personal information
- Full name: Carlos Eduardo Keosseián Lagomarsino
- Date of birth: 18 March 1988 (age 38)
- Place of birth: Montevideo, Uruguay
- Height: 1.77 m (5 ft 10 in)
- Position: Midfielder

Youth career
- Defensor Sporting

Senior career*
Years	Team	Apps	(Gls)
2008–2009	Defensor Sporting	0	(0)
2009–2011	Racing Montevideo	11	(0)
2011–2012	Temperley	30	(1)
2012–2013	Juventud Antoniana	26	(0)
2013–2015	Atenas	50	(7)
2015–2016	Magallanes	18	(0)
2016–2017	Atenas	9	(0)
2017	LDU Portoviejo	5	(0)
2017–2018	Atenas	40	(0)
2019	Tacuarembó	10	(1)
2021	Lavalleja de Rocha	6	(1)
- * Club domestic league appearances and goals

Carlos Eduardo Keosseián Lagomarsino (born 18 March 1988) is a Uruguayan former footballer who played as a midfielder.

== Career ==
In 2015–16, Keosseián signed with Chilean club Magallanes.

On 9 January 2018, Atenas announced that Keosseián had signed a new contract with the club. The next year, he played for Tacuarembó.

In 2021, Keosseián played for Lavalleja de Rocha.

== Personal life ==
Keosseián is of Armenian descent through his paternal grandparents. Carlos is the son of the football manager and former player Manuel Keosseián.
