= 1975 Honduran Segunda División =

Honduran Segunda División
- Season: 1975–76
- Champions: Campamento
- Promoted: Campamento
- All statistics correct as of 21 December 1975.

The 1975 Honduran Segunda División was the ninth season of the Honduran Segunda División. Under the management of Alfonso Uclés, Campamento won the tournament after defeating C.D. Lenca in the final series and obtained promotion to the 1976–77 Honduran Liga Nacional.

== Final ==
December 1975 1st leg	Lenca	3–3	Campamento

21 December 1975 2nd leg	Campamento	2–2	Lenca	Tegucigalpa, Francisco Morazán
				Stadium: Estadio Tiburcio Carías Andino

- Campamento 5–5 Lenca on aggregate. Campamento won on forfeit.
