= Édgar Núñez (footballer) =

Honduran footballer (born 1979)

Edgar Núñez
Personal information
- Full name: Edgar Daniel Núñez Ortíz
- Date of birth: 23 August 1979 (age 47)
- Place of birth: Honduras
- Position: Striker

Senior career*
Years	Team	Apps	(Gls)
2003–2004	Atlético Olanchano		(13)
2004	Real España	10	(3)
2005	Atlético Olanchano		
2005	Marathón	6	(0)
2006	Vida	8	(1)
2006	Atlético Olanchano	47	
2007–2008	Atlético Olanchano	28	(4)
2008–2010	Deportes Savio	10	(1)
2010–2011	Deportivo Xinabajul		

International career
2005	Honduras	2	(0)
- * Club domestic league appearances and goals

Edgar Daniel Núñez Ortíz (born 23 August 1979), is a Honduran football striker.

== Club career ==
Núñez played 71 matches in the Honduran national league, scoring 17 goals while playing for Atlético Olanchano, Real España, Marathón and Vida. He joined Deportes Savio for the 2008 Apertura season.

Núñez and compatriot Elkin González were injured in a car accident when playing for Guatemalan side Deportivo Xinabajul.

== International career ==
Núñez made his debut for Honduras in a June 2005 friendly match against Jamaica and has earned a total of 2 caps, scoring no goals. He was a non-playing squad member at the 2005 CONCACAF Gold Cup.

His final international was a July 2005 friendly match against Canada.
