= Atlético Olanchano =

Honduran football club

Olanchano
- Full name: Atlético Olanchano
- Nicknames: Los Toros; Los Pamperos
- Founded: 17 July 2001; 24 years ago
- Dissolved: 26 August 2016; 9 years ago
- Ground: Estadio Rubén Guifarro, Catacamas, Honduras
- Capacity: 5,000
- Chairman: Rene Rosales
- League: Liga Nacional de Ascenso de Honduras
- 07-08 Clausura: 7th (Relegated)
Home colours	Away colours

Atlético Olanchano was a Honduran football club based in Catacamas, Olancho.

The club last played in the Honduran second division.

== History ==
=== Campamento ===
Atlético Olanchano was founded as Campamento in 1974 and originally played their games in Campamento, Olancho. The team later moved to Catacamas and so the name was remodified to Juventud Catacamas.

=== Atlético Olanchano ===
On 17 July 2001 the team was bought by some business men and they decided to change the name to Atletico Olanchano.

The club played in the top league for the first time as Campamento in the 1976/77 season. They were relegated the same year after finishing in last place.

The club returned as Atlético Olanchano when it was promoted to Liga Nacional de Futbol de Honduras for the first time in the 2003–04 season but were relegated back down to Liga de Ascenso de Honduras after they finished in last place in the 2004–05 season. The team was coached by Oswaldo Altamirano at that time. They were promoted back to Primera Division when they defeated Deportivo Lenca and became champions of Liga de Ascenso for the second time during the 2005–06 season. The team was relegated for the second time on 3 May 2008 when they lost a match to Hispano on the last day of the regular season.

== Achievements ==
- Segunda División / Liga de Ascenso

Winners (3): 1975, 2002–03, 2005–06 A

== League performance ==
Regular season									Post season							
Season	Pos.	G	W	D	L	F:A	PTS	+/-	Pos.	G	W	D	L	F:A	PTS	+/-
1976–77	10th	27	4	5	18	13:42	13	-29	Did not enter							
2003–04 A	9th	18	3	6	9	20:31	15	-11	Did not enter							
2003–04 C	7th	16	3	5	8	21:30	14	-9	Did not enter							
2004–05 A	7th	18	4	8	6	23:27	20	-4	Did not enter							
2004–05 C	10th	18	3	5	10	21:31	14	-10	Did not enter							
2006–07 A	6th	18	6	5	7	24:25	23	-1	Did not enter							
2006–07 C	8th	17	5	3	9	16:23	18	-7	Did not enter							
2007–08 A	10th	18	3	4	11	15:29	13	-14	Did not enter							
2007–08 C	7th	18	6	3	9	19:25	21	-6	Did not enter							

- In 1976–77 as Campamento

== All-time record vs. opponents ==
- As of 2007–08 Clausura

Opponent	G	W	D	L	F	A	PTS	+/-
Universidad / Broncos UNAH	12	6	2	4	16	13	20	+3
Platense	16	4	8	4	24	26	20	-2
Vida	16	5	4	7	26	28	19	-2
Motagua	16	3	4	9	18	26	19	-8
Real España	16	5	2	9	20	26	17	-6
Victoria	15	2	5	8	16	27	11	-11
Hispano	8	2	3	3	7	10	9	-3
Marathón	16	2	3	11	10	27	9	-17
Deportes Savio	4	2	1	1	5	4	7	+1
Valencia	4	1	2	1	5	4	5	+1
Real Patepluma	2	1	1	0	5	2	4	+3
Olimpia	16	0	4	12	7	28	4	-21

== Dissolution ==
On 26 August 2016, the Honduran Liga Nacional de Ascenso decided to disaffiliate the franchise from the competition due to non-payment of the entrance fee to the 2016–17 season forcing the club's dissolution.

== All-time top goalscorers ==
As of March 2014

- (Honduras) Édgar Núñez 17
- (Brazil) Ney Costa 16
- (Brazil) Marcelo Ferreira 11

== Former managers ==
- (Uruguay) Santos "Cocodrilo" González (2005)
- (Honduras) Gilberto Yearwood (2006–2007)
- (Honduras) Edwin Pavón (2007–2008)

== Followers ==
Mel Zelaya – Honduran President
