= C.D. Lenca =

Lenca
- Full name: Club Deportivo Lenca
- Nickname(s): Los Cachorros
- Ground: Estadio Humberto Micheleti, El Progreso, Honduras
- Capacity: 5,000
- Manager: Ernesto Cáceres
- League: Liga Mayor
- 2012–13: Yoro Champions
Home colours	Away colours

Deportivo Lenca was a Honduran soccer club based on El Progreso, Honduras.

It played in Liga de Ascenso de Honduras but in 2008 it was bought by Club Junior from El Negrito, Yoro. They currently play in Liga Mayor de Honduras.

Their name derives from the Lenca people and their emblem once featured the Chief Lempira, a national hero in Honduras.

== Achievements ==
- Segunda División / Liga de Ascenso

Winners (1): 2005–06 C
Runners-up (2): 1970–71, 1975

- Yoro Championship

Winners (1): 1961
