= Héctor Olivos =

Chilean footballer

Personal information
- Full name: Héctor Enrique Olivos Carreño
- Date of birth: 6 June 1953 (age 73)
- Place of birth: Puente Alto, Santiago, Chile
- Position: Attacking midfielder

Youth career
- Deportivo Maipo
- Iberia-Puente Alto

Senior career*
Years	Team	Apps	(Gls)
1968	Iberia-Puente Alto		
1969–1970	Iberia Los Ángeles		
1970–1971	Audax Italiano	17	(1)
1972	Ñublense		
1973	Unión La Calera	24	(2)
1974	O'Higgins	27	(2)
1975–1977	Universidad Católica	74	(17)
1978	Huachipato	21	(0)
1979	Real España		
1980–1981	Cobresal		
1982	Deportes Antofagasta		
1983	Cobresal		
1984	San Luis	18	(6)
1985	Audax Italiano	20	(4)
1986	Magallanes	14	(0)
1987	Deportes Laja		
1988	Santiago Wanderers	16	(0)
- * Club domestic league appearances and goals

Héctor Enrique Olivos Carreño (born 6 June 1953) is a Chilean former footballer who played as an attacking midfielder for clubs in Chile and Honduras.

== Career ==
As a youth player, Olivos was with Deportivo Maipo and Iberia-Puente Alto. With an extensive career in his homeland, in the Chilean Primera División he played for Audax Italiano, Unión La Calera, O'Higgins, Universidad Católica, Huachipato, San Luis de Quillota and Magallanes.

In the Chilean Segunda División, he played for Iberia-Puente Alto, Iberia de Los Ángeles, Ñublense, Universidad Católica, Cobresal, Deportes Antofagasta, Deportes Laja and Santiago Wanderers.

He was a member of the first squad of Cobresal in their history in the 1980 season.

He won two Segunda División titles with Universidad Católica in 1975 and Cobresal in 1983.

Abroad, he had a stint with Honduran club Real España in 1979.

== Post-retirement ==
He served as a football agent for well-known players such as Ricardo Rojas and Carlos Reyes.

He has also served as manager of the music band Shamanes Crew. He had a close friendship with Mc Browen, a band member deceased on 11 February 2013.

== Personal life ==
He is nicknamed Tito, an affective form of "Héctor", and Chueco (Bow Legged).
