= David Álvarez (footballer, born 1985) =

Honduran footballer

Personal information
- Full name: David Daniel Álvarez Martínez
- Date of birth: 5 December 1985 (age 40)
- Place of birth: Honduras
- Height: 1.70 m (5 ft 7 in)
- Position: Rightback

Senior career*
Years	Team	Apps	(Gls)
2007–2008	Marathón		
2008	Hispano		
2008	Deportes Savio		
2010	Deportivo San Pedro		
2010	Hispano		
2011	Motagua	2	(0)
Medal record
Representing Honduras U-23
Gold medal – first place	CONCACAF U-23	2008
Representing Motagua
Gold medal – first place	Liga Nacional	2010–11 C
- * Club domestic league appearances and goals as of 7 June 2011 ‡ National team caps and goals as of 13 August 2008

David Daniel Álvarez Martínez (born 5 December 1985 in Honduras) is a Honduran football defender.

== Club career ==
Nicknamed Colingo, Álvarez played for Marathón, Savio, by whom he was released before the 2009 Clausura, Hispano where he was dismissed after suffering from dengue and the Guatemalan second division before he joined Motagua in January 2011 before the 2011 Clausura. He was however immediately sidelined through injury but was able to resume playing after a month. He was released by Motagua in June 2011.

== International career ==
He was a member of the Honduras national football team, he also played at the 2008 Summer Olympics.
