= Claudio Chavarría =

Chilean footballer (born 1980)

Personal information
- Full name: Claudio Patricio Chavarría Pantoja
- Date of birth: 19 January 1980 (age 46)
- Place of birth: Temuco, Chile
- Height: 1.73 m (5 ft 8 in)
- Position: Midfielder

Senior career*
Years	Team	Apps	(Gls)
1993–1998	Universidad Católica		
1998–2000	Borussia Dortmund II		
2001	SV Straelen	5	(0)
2001	Deportes Puerto Montt		
2002	Coquimbo Unido		
2003	Pumas UNAH		
2004	Rangers	1	(0)
2005	Municipal Valencia		
2005	Deportes Temuco	7	(0)
2006	CD Heredia		
2006-2007	Broncos UNAH		
2007-2008	Municipal Cañar	17	(0)
2008	Alianza Atlético	6	(0)
2009-2010	Sportivo Luqueño	1	(0)
2010-2011	Olimpia		
- * Club domestic league appearances and goals

Claudio Patricio Chavarría Pantoja (born 19 January 1980) is a Chilean former professional footballer who played as a midfielder.

== Career ==
From 1998 to 2001 Chavarría played for the German clubs Borussia Dortmund II and SV Straelen.
