= Astor Henríquez =

Honduran footballer (born 1983)

Personal information
- Full name: Astor Shermón Henríquez Cooper
- Date of birth: February 26, 1983 (age 43)
- Place of birth: Tegucigalpa, Honduras
- Position: Defender

Team information
- Current team: Marathón

Youth career
- Olimpia
- Club Deportivo Honduras

Senior career*
Years	Team	Apps	(Gls)
1999–2004	Universidad		
2005	Motagua		(0)
2005–2011	Marathón		
2012	Hunan Billows	24	(0)
2013–present	Marathón		

International career^{‡}
2005–2008	Honduras	9	(0)
- * Club domestic league appearances and goals as of 2005 ‡ National team caps and goals as of 26 January 2013

Astor Shermón Henríquez Cooper (Latin American Spanish: [ˈastoɾ enˈrikes]; born 26 February 1983) is a Honduran footballer, who currently plays for Marathón in the Honduran National League as a defender.

== Club career ==
Henríquez started his career at Universidad and, after a short stint at F.C. Motagua, played for Marathón for five years. He moved abroad to play alongside compatriots Erick Norales and Emil Martínez for Chinese second division side Hunan Billows in 2012.

He returned to Marathón for the 2013 Clausura championship.

== International career ==
Henríquez made his debut for Honduras in a February 2005 UNCAF Nations Cup match against Guatemala and has earned a total of 9 caps, scoring no goals. He has represented his country at the 2005 UNCAF Nations Cup as well as at the 2005 CONCACAF Gold Cup.

His final international was a March 2008 friendly match against Colombia.

== Personal life ==
Henríquez is married to Lilian, and they have a daughter, Yolana. He has a brother and sister. His parents are divorced.
