= Edmílson (footballer, born 1977) =

Brazilian footballer

Personal information
- Full name: Edmílson Barros de Souza
- Date of birth: December 9, 1977 (age 48)
- Place of birth: Coxim, Brazil
- Height: 1.79 m (5 ft 10 in)
- Position: Centre-back

Youth career
- 1996–1997: Comercial-MS

Senior career*
Years	Team	Apps	(Gls)
1998–2000	Comercial-MS		
2001	Inter de Limeira		
2001	Goiás	24	(5)
2001–2002	CSA		
2003	CENE		
2004	Atlético Sorocaba		
2004	Noroeste		
2005–2006	CENE		
2006	Paraná	22	(3)
2006–2009	Palmeiras	5	(0)
2011	CENE		
2011	Madureira		
- * Club domestic league appearances and goals

Edmílson Barros de Souza (born December 9, 1977), or simply Edmílson, is a Brazilian former professional footballer who played as a centre-back.

== Honours ==
- Mato Grosso do Sul State League: 2000, 2003
