= Estadio Rubén Guifarro =

Coordinates: 14.842502°N 85.886591°W

- Interactive map of Estadio Rubén Guifarro
- Location: Catacamas, Honduras
- Owner: Municipality of Catacamas
- Operator: Atlético Olanchano
- Capacity: 5,000
- Surface: grass

Tenants
- Atlético Olanchano (2001–2016); Motagua (alternate)

Estadio Rubén Guifarro is a multi-purpose stadium in Catacamas, Honduras. It is currently used mostly for football matches and it was home for Atlético Olanchano from 2001 until 2016. The stadium holds 5,000 people. The stadium was renovated for the 2007–08 season. Some of the works included changing the grass turf and increasing the capacity of the stadium. The stadium is also occasionally used by C.D. Motagua as an alternate venue.
