= Carlos Izquierdo (footballer) =

Peruvian footballer (born 1949)

Personal information
- Full name: Carlos Alberto Izquierdo Sánchez
- Date of birth: 5 September 1949 (age 77)
- Place of birth: Tumbes, Department of Tumbes, Peru
- Position: Center forward

Senior career*
Years	Team	Apps	(Gls)
1965	Mariscal Castilla		
1966–1967	Círculo Rojo		
1968	Húsares de Junín		
1969	Atlético Torino		
1970–1973	Atlético Grau		
1974	Carmen Mora de Encalada		
1974–1976	Broncos de Choluteca		
1978	Olmedo		
1979	Turrialba		
1980	Cartaginés		
1981	Ramonense		
1982	Universidad de El Salvador		
1984	Cobán Imperial		
- * Club domestic league appearances and goals

Carlos Alberto Izquierdo Sánchez (born 5 September 1949) is a retired Peruvian footballer. Nicknamed "Calulo", he played as a center forward across various domestic leagues throughout the 1970s and the 1980s, mostly playing in Ecuador and Central America.

== Career ==
Izquierdo began his career within Mariscal Castilla within the Liga de Tumbes. He then began playing within the Copa Perú throughout the remainder of the 1960s with Círculo Rojo, Húsares de Junín and Atlético Torino. The 1970s saw Izquierdo play in the top-flight of Peruvian football through playing for Atlético Grau though he would primarily play as a substitute player. Not seeing sufficient results, he decided to play abroad in Ecuador for Carmen Mora de Encalada for the 1974 Campeonato Ecuatoriano de Fútbol Serie B where the club had an average performance. He decided to continue playing abroad for Honduran club Broncos de Choluteca for several seasons as one of the few foreign players in the tournament. Izquierdo then returned to Ecuador to play for Olmedo for the club where he made his debut in the game against Manta as despite the club having an otherwise terrible season, Izquierdo would be one of the few highlights for that season.

He then went to Costa Rica as he enjoyed his greatest season with Turrialba as despite the club performing poorly overall, he was named the top goalscorer of the tournament, sharing the honor with Limonense forward Howard Rooper during the 1979 Costa Rican Football Championship with 13 goals scored for each. Following his tenure, he went on to play for Cartaginés as he went on to score 18 goals throughout his career in Costa Rica, becoming one of the most successful foreign players there.
