= Edmílson (given name) =

Edmílson is a given name. It most commonly refers to José Edmílson Gomes Moraes, a retired Brazilian footballer.

Other notable people with the name include:

- Edmilson Alves (born 1976), Brazilian footballer
- Edmílson Barros de Souza (born 1977), Brazilian footballer
- Edmilson Carlos Abel (born 1974), Brazilian footballer
- Edmilson de Carvalho Barbosa (born 1979), Brazilian footballer
- Edmilson Dias de Lucena (born 1968), Brazilian footballer
- Edmilson Ferreira (born 1979), Brazilian footballer
- Edmilson Gonçalves Pimenta (born 1971), Brazilian footballer
- Edmilson Junior, (born 1994), Belgian footballer
- Edmilson Marques Pardal (born 1980), Brazilian footballer
- Edmílson Matias (born 1974), Brazilian footballer
- Edmilson de Paula Santos Filho (born 1997), Brazilian footballer
- Edmilson Rodrigues (born 1957), Brazilian politician, mayor of Belém
- Edmilson da Silva Melo (born 1980), Brazilian footballer
- Edmilson Santana (born 1987), Brazilian long-distance runner
- Edmílson dos Santos Carmo Júnior (born 1987), Brazilian footballer
- Edmílson dos Santos Silva (born 1982), Brazilian footballer
