= Nilberto =

Brazilian footballer

Personal information
- Full name: Nilberto da Silva Melo
- Date of birth: 18 November 1973 (age 52)
- Place of birth: Rio de Janeiro, Brazil
- Height: 1.73 m (5 ft 8 in)
- Position: Midfielder

Senior career*
Years	Team	Apps	(Gls)
1995–2000	Santos		
2000–2003	Fluminense		
2003–2005	Vasco da Gama		
2005–2006	Portuguesa		
2007	Macaé		
2007–2008	Marathón		
2008–2009	Motagua	4	(1)
- * Club domestic league appearances and goals as of 2009-02-22

Nilberto da Silva Melo (born 18 November 1973) is a Brazilian retired footballer who last played as a midfielder for F.C. Motagua.

== Club career ==
He and his brother Edmilson, came to Honduras to C.D. Marathón and after two season they left to Motagua because they didn't fit into Manuel Keosseian's tactics.

== Personal life ==
He has four football playing brothers: former Flamengo midfielder Nélio, Cruzeiro- and Brazilian World Cup defender Gilberto, former El Salvador international Nildeson and Edmilson with whom he played in Honduras.
