= Mauricio Sabillón =

Honduran footballer (born 1978)

Personal information
- Full name: Mauricio Alberto Sabillón Peña
- Date of birth: 11 November 1978 (age 47)
- Place of birth: Quimistán, Honduras
- Height: 1.87 m (6 ft 1 1/2 in)
- Position: Right back

Senior career*
Years	Team	Apps	(Gls)
1999–2016	Marathón	486	
2010	Hangzhou Greentown (loan)	24	(0)

International career^{‡}
2001–2012	Honduras	49	(0)
- * Club domestic league appearances and goals as of 2010-11-06 ‡ National team caps and goals as of 2010-02-12

Mauricio Alberto Sabillón Peña (born 11 November 1978) is a Honduran former football player who last played for Marathón.

He played for the Honduras national football team from 2001 to 2012, earning 49 caps.

== Club career ==
Sabillón began his career with Marathón in 1999 and remained at the club for more than ten years and was viewed as one of the team's top players. While with Marathón, the technically skilled Sabillón played primarily as a right back. During his decade with Marathón, they enjoyed the greatest period in its history capturing six domestic titles during that time.

=== China ===
His play with Marathón drew the interest of Chinese club Hangzhou Greentown whom he joined in 2010. In his one season with Hangzhou Sabillón appeared in 24 league matches helping the club to a fourth-place finish and qualification to the 2011 AFC Champions League Group stage. After one season in China Sabillón returned to Marathón.

On January 27, 2011, Sabillón confirmed that he received an offer from Major League Soccer side New York Red Bulls, but a deal had to be agreed to with Marathón as he has a year remaining on his contract.

== International career ==
Sabillón made his debut for Honduras in a May 2001 UNCAF Nations Cup match against Panama and has earned a total of 49 caps, scoring no goals. He has represented his country in 14 FIFA World Cup qualification matches and played at the 2001 and 2011 UNCAF Nations Cups as well as at the 2011 CONCACAF Gold Cup.

He helped Honduras qualify for the 2010 World Cup. There was speculation that his move to Hangzhou Greentown could jeopardize his selection to the World Cup squad, however coach Reinaldo Rueda included Sabillón in the 23 man squad. He made his World Cup debut on June 25, 2010, in a 0–0 draw with Switzerland going the full 90.

== Honours ==
=== Club ===
C.D. Marathón

- Liga Nacional de Fútbol de Honduras (6): 2001-02 Clausura, 2002-03 Clausura, 2004-05 Apertura, 2007-08 Apertura, 2008-09 Apertura, 2009-10 Apertura
  - Runners-up (6): 2001-02 Apertura, 2003-04 Clausura, 2004-05 Clausura, 2005-06 Apertura, 2006-07 Clausura, 2007-08 Clausura
