= Mario Beata =

Honduran footballer (born 1974)

Personal information
- Full name: Mario Roberto Beata Reyes
- Date of birth: 17 October 1974 (age 52)
- Place of birth: Puerto Cortés, Honduras
- Height: 1.84 m (6 ft 0 in)
- Position: Defender

Senior career*
Years	Team	Apps	(Gls)
1992–1998	Marathón	80	(1)
1999–2001	Platense	81	(0)
2002–2005	Olimpia	116	(0)
2006–2010	Marathón	144	(4)
2010–2011	Hunan Billows	37	(3)
2012	Marathón	5	(0)

International career^{‡}
1996–2009	Honduras	24	(0)
- * Club domestic league appearances and goals as of 2007 ‡ National team caps and goals as of 25 September 2012

Mario Roberto Beata Reyes (born October 17, 1974) is a retired Honduran soccer player.

== Club career ==
Beata made his league debut for Marathón in 1992 against Súper Estrella and also played for Honduran sides Platense and Olimpia. He signed a contract with Hunan Billows in February 2010. He made his debut for Hunan against Shenyang Dongjin on 3 April and scored his first goal on 1 May.

He announced his retirement in March 2012. He played 426 matches in the national league, what made him the Honduran with most matches played in the league. He scored 5 goals in total, all of them for Marathón, and won 8 league titles.

== International career ==
He made his debut for Honduras in a March 1996 friendly match against Colombia and has earned a total of 24 caps, scoring no goals. He has represented his country in 3 FIFA World Cup qualification matches and played at the 2007 UNCAF Nations Cup.

His final international was a June 2009 FIFA World Cup qualification match against the USA.

== Personal life ==
Beata is married to Ángela Hernández with whom he has two children. He also has two children with his former wife.

== Honours ==
- Honduran League: 8

2001 Clausura, 2002 Apertura, 2004 Clausura, 2005 Clausura, 2005 Apertura, 2007 Apertura, 2008 Apertura, 2009 Apertura
