= Richard Pérez =

Uruguayan footballer (born 1973)

Personal information
- Full name: Richard Fabián Pérez
- Date of birth: 23 September 1973 (age 53)
- Place of birth: San Carlos, Uruguay
- Height: 1.89 m (6 ft 2 in)
- Position: Midfielder

Team information
- Current team: Victoria

Senior career*
Years	Team	Apps	(Gls)
1998–1999	Fénix		
2000	Libertad de San Carlos		
2001–2003	Deportivo Maldonado		
2004	Defensor Sporting		
2005	Atenas		
2006	Deportivo Maldonado		
2007–2008	Vida		
2008–	Victoria	14	(1)
- * Club domestic league appearances and goals

Richard Pérez (born 23 September 1973 in San Carlos) is a Uruguayan football midfielder. He currently plays for Victoria in Liga Nacional de Honduras.

== Club career ==
Pérez previously played for Centro Atlético Fénix, Deportivo Maldonado and Defensor Sporting in the Primera División Uruguaya.

== Statistics ==
Team	Season	Games	Start	Sub	Goal	YC	RC
Club Deportivo Victoria	2008-09 A	14	6	8	1	1	0
