= José Güity =

Honduran footballer (born 1985)

Personal information
- Full name: José César Güity Vuelto
- Date of birth: 19 May 1985 (age 41)
- Place of birth: La Ceiba, Honduras
- Position: Striker

Youth career
- Marathón

Senior career*
Years	Team	Apps	(Gls)
2004–2008	Marathón	46	(11)
2007	→ Hispano (loan)	16	(3)
2008	Shanghai Shenhua		
2009	Vida		
2009	Herediano		
2009–2010	Peñarol La Mesilla		
2010	Jalapa		
2011	Juventud Retalteca		
2011	Parrillas One		
2012	Real Sociedad		

International career^{‡}
2008	Honduras U-23	5	(0)
- * Club domestic league appearances and goals as of 2008 ‡ National team caps and goals as of 13 August 2008

José César Güity Vuelto (born 19 May 1985) is a Honduran football player.

== Club career ==
Nicknamed Baba, Güity started his career at Marathón and joined Chinese side Shanghai Shenhua for a short spell after the Beijing Olympics. After he returned to Honduras to play for Vida, he again moved abroad in summer 2009 to play for Costa Rican side Herediano, and made his debut in July 2009, immediately scoring the winning goal against L.D. Alajuelense. However, he already left them in August 2009 to make his debut for Guatemalan outfit Peñarol La Mesilla in October 2009.

Güity joined Guatemalans Jalapa for the 2010 Apertura championship. In July 2011 he went on trial to Salvadoran giants Alianza but he ended up in the Honduran second division with Parrillas One. He joined Real Sociedad for the 2012 Clausura.

== International career ==
Güity played three games at the 2005 FIFA World Youth Championship in the Netherlands. He was also part of the U-23 Honduras national football team that won the 2008 CONCACAF Men's Pre-Olympic Tournament and qualified to the 2008 Summer Olympics.
