= Edmilson (footballer, born 2 June 1980) =

Brazilian footballer

Personal information
- Full name: Edmilson da Silva Melo
- Date of birth: 2 June 1980 (age 46)
- Place of birth: Brazil
- Position: Forward

Senior career*
Years	Team	Apps	(Gls)
2001	Flamengo		
2002	Brasiliense		
2002	→ Flamengo (loan)	0	(0)
2005	Bangu	0	(0)
2006	Santacruzense	0	(0)
2007	Pinheiros	0	(0)
2007–2008	Marathón	26	(9)
2008–2009	Real España		
2009–2010	Victoria		
2010	Hunan Billows	12	(1)
2011	Villa Nova (MG)		
- * Club domestic league appearances and goals

Edmilson da Silva Melo (born 2 June 1980) is a Brazilian former footballer who played as a forward.

== Career ==
Edmilson played twice for Flamengo at 2002 Copa Libertadores. He also played for Brasiliense.

He and his brother Niberto came to Honduras to play for C.D. Marathón, leaving after one season due to tactical disagreements with Manuel Keosseian. Edmilson joined Motagua but was transferred to Real España due to injuries and behavioral issues. He also played for Pinheiros Futebol Clube in Espírito Santo.

He moved to the China League One club Hunan Billows in June 2010.
