= Luis Santamaría =

Honduran footballer (born 1975)

Personal information
- Full name: Luis Santamaría Crisanto Figueroa
- Date of birth: 22 November 1975 (age 50)
- Place of birth: Iriona, Honduras
- Height: 1.87 m (6 ft 2 in)
- Positions: Defender; forward

Team information
- Current team: Barillas F.C.
- Number: 4

Senior career*
Years	Team	Apps	(Gls)
1993–2001	Marathón		
2001–2002	Real España		
2002–2005	Marathón		
2005	Motagua		
2005–2008	Marathón		
2006	Beijing Guoan		
2008	Qingdao Zhongneng	8	(1)
2008	Vida	16	(2)
2009–2011	Marathón	36	(1)
2011–2012	Necaxa		
2012–2013	Atlético Choloma	33	
2013–2014	Barillas F.C.		

International career
2000–2007	Honduras	2	(1)
- * Club domestic league appearances and goals

Luis Santamaría Crisanto Figueroa (born 22 November 1975) is a Honduran footballer who plays for Liga Nacional de Honduras club Atlético Choloma as a defender.

== Club career ==
A big, lanky defender, Santamaría started his career at Marathón and also played for other Honduran giants Real España and F.C. Motagua. In 2007, he signed a contract with Chinese club Beijing Guoan. He also had a spell with Qingdao Zhongneng in 2008.

In summer 2011 Santamaría joined Necaxa and in summer 2012 he moved to Atlético Choloma.

== International career ==
Santamaría made his debut for Honduras in a November 2000 FIFA World Cup qualification match against Saint Vincent & the Grenadines and has earned a total of 2 caps, scoring 1 goal. He was a non-playing squad member at the 2007 CONCACAF Gold Cup.

His second and final international was a May 2007 friendly match against Venezuela.

=== International goals ===
N.	Date	Venue	Opponent	Score	Result	Competition
1	15 November 2000	Arnos Vale Stadium, Kingstown, Saint Vincent and the Grenadines	Saint Vincent and the Grenadines	4–0	7–0	2002 FIFA World Cup qualification
