= Luis López (footballer, born 1986) =

Honduran footballer

Personal information
- Full name: Luis Alfredo López Flores
- Date of birth: 29 August 1986 (age 40)
- Place of birth: Comayagua, Honduras
- Height: 1.80 m (5 ft 11 in)
- Position: Forward

Senior career*
Years	Team	Apps	(Gls)
2007	Marathón		(4)
2007	Platense		
2008	Marathón	12	(2)
2008	Hispano		
2009	Alacranes de Durango	10	(2)
2009	Botev Plovdiv	0	(0)
2010	Marathón	8	(0)
2010	Srem	8	(0)
2011	Novi Pazar	0	(0)
2011	Marathón		
2011	Motagua	9	(0)
2012–2013	Juventud Escuintleca	8	(1)
2014	Deportes Savio	1	(0)
2015–2018	Deportivo Nueva Concepción		

International career
2008–2008	Honduras U23	7	(0)
2009	Honduras	1	(0)
Medal record
Representing Honduras U-23
Gold medal – first place	CONCACAF U-23	2008
- * Club domestic league appearances and goals

Luis Alfredo López Flores (born 29 August 1986) is a Honduran football forward.

== Club career ==
López played for Platense and moved to Marathón, making his debut against Broncos UNAH scoring 2 goals, and his next match against Olimpia in the Clasico Nacional Hondureño he scored the only and winning goal. He played for hometown club Hispano in the 2008 Apertura, after initially rejecting their offer.

=== Spells abroad ===
He was announced as member of Alacranes de Durango on 17 December 2008. On 12 October 2009 he signed a one-year contract with Bulgarian football club Botev Plovdiv, but after limited appearances with the Bulgarian side he returned to Marathón during the January 2010 transfer window. In summer 2010, he returned to Europe this time to play with Serbian outfit FK Srem. At the beginning of 2011 López agreed terms with FK Novi Pazar, another Serbian First League club, however he left before making any league appearance.

On 29 April 2011, Motagua announced its agreement with López for one year.

In June 2012, he joined Guatemalan side Juventud Escuintleca of the Guatemalan National League.

== International career ==
López was part of the U-23 Honduras national football team that won the 2008 CONCACAF Men's Pre-Olympic Tournament. He also played in the 2008 Summer Olympics.

He earned his first cap with Honduras in a 1–0 victory over Grenada of Gold Cup on 11 July 2009.
