= Milton Palacios (footballer, born 1980) =

Honduran footballer

Personal information
- Full name: Milton José Palacios Suazo
- Date of birth: December 2, 1980 (age 45)
- Place of birth: La Ceiba, Honduras
- Height: 1.88 m (6 ft 2 in)
- Position: Centre-back

Senior career*
Years	Team	Apps	(Gls)
1998–1999	Olimpia		
1999–2002	Victoria	58	(6)
2002–2007	Olimpia		
2007–2009	Marathón	35	(5)
2009	Olimpia	1	(0)
2009–2010	Marathón	11	(2)
2011	Victoria	15	(1)

International career^{‡}
2003–2006	Honduras	15	(0)
- * Club domestic league appearances and goals as of 2007 ‡ National team caps and goals as of 2007

Milton José Palacios Suazo (Spanish pronunciation: [ˈmiltom paˈlasjos]; (Note: In isolation, Milton is pronounced [ˈmilton].) born December 2, 1980) is a retired Honduran footballer who played as a centre-back.

== Club career ==
A tall central defender, Palacios started his career with Olimpia and also played for Victoria. After a 2003 friendly match between Olimpia and Chilean powerhouse Colo-Colo, Iván Zamorano (then a Colo-Colo player) recommended him for the Chilean club; however, both teams failed to reach an agreement despite Colo-Colo having registered the player, and Palacios remained in Olimpia. He joined Marathón in May 2007, but left them in summer 2009 for a short spell at Olimpia only to return to Marathón the same year. In December 2010 he returned to Victoria.

== International career ==
Palacios made his debut for Honduras in an April 2003 friendly match against Paraguay and has earned a total of 15 caps, scoring no goals. He has represented his country in 2 FIFA World Cup qualification matches and played at the 2003 CONCACAF Gold Cup.

His final international was a September 2006 friendly match against El Salvador.

== Personal life ==
He is a son of Eulogio and Orfilia Palacios and is the oldest of 5 brothers: Johnny, Jerry, Wilson and Edwin René Palacios. On 30 October 2007 Edwin, aged 14, was kidnapped in La Ceiba; he was found murdered one year and seven months later in Omoa. .
