= Edilson Pereira =

Brazilian footballer (born 1981)

Personal information
- Full name: Edilson Pereira do Santos
- Date of birth: July 11, 1981 (age 45)
- Place of birth: Salvador, Brazil
- Height: 1.65 m (5 ft 5 in)
- Position: Forward

Team information
- Current team: Platense

Senior career*
Years	Team	Apps	(Gls)
- Jaruense Belena Sporting Club
- Santana
- Guayatuba
2007–2008	Deportes Savio	18	(5)
2008–	Platense		
2011–	Marathón		
- * Club domestic league appearances and goals as of 2007

Edilson Pereira do Santos (born July 11, 1981) is a Brazilian football striker, who currently plays for Platense.

== Club career ==
Edilson joined Marathón ahead of the 2011 Clausura
