= Andy Furtado =

Costa Rican footballer (born 1980)

Personal information
- Full name: Andy Furtado Dixon
- Date of birth: October 30, 1980 (age 46)
- Place of birth: Limón, Costa Rica
- Height: 1.90 m (6 ft 3 in)
- Position: Forward

Team information
- Current team: Belén

Senior career*
Years	Team	Apps	(Gls)
2000–2004	Santos de Guápiles		
2004–2005	Fusión Tibás		
2005–2007	San Carlos	50	(18)
2008	Marathón	19	(6)
2009	→ Herediano (loan)	13	(3)
2009	Marathón	0	(0)
2010	Shanghai Shenhua		
2011	Comunicaciones	9	(1)
2012	Limón	10	(1)
2012–2013	Belén	18	(2)

International career^{‡}
2007–2009	Costa Rica	9	(5)
- * Club domestic league appearances and goals ‡ National team caps and goals as of 17 October 2009

Andy Furtado Dixon (born 3 January 1980) is a Costa Rican footballer who currently plays for Belén.

== Club career ==
He lost the Second Division championship final in May 2005 with Fusión Tibás. In August 2008 Furtado signed a 4-month contract with Chinese side Shanghai Shenhua.

He played in the CONCACAF's Champions League 2008–09, with Marathón of Honduras. In January 2009 he moved to Herediano on loan. After returning to Marathón, Furtado was banned from football by the Costa Rica football federation in September 2009, after being tested positive for betamethasone. In May 2011 he resumed playing when he was snapped up by Guatemalan outfit Comunicaciones.

In January 2012, he returned to Costa Rica to play for Limón and in Summer 2012, he joined Belén. In summer 2013 he left Belén but was denied by Santos due to physical problems.

== International career ==
Furtado made his debut for Costa Rica in a February 2007 friendly match against Trinidad & Tobago and earned a total of 9 caps, scoring 5 goals. He represented his country in 2 FIFA World Cup qualification matches and played at the 2007 and 2009 UNCAF Nations Cup, where he scored the 2 winning goals over Panama on the 6' and 15' minute, which made Costa Rica win 3–0.

His final international was an April 2009 FIFA World Cup qualification match against El Salvador.
