= Carlos Oliva (footballer, born 1979) =

Honduran footballer (born 1979)

Personal information
- Full name: Carlos Alberto Oliva Argueta
- Date of birth: 28 July 1979 (age 47)
- Place of birth: San Pedro Sula, Honduras
- Height: 1.77 m (5 ft 10 in)
- Position: Attacking midfielder

Senior career*
Years	Team	Apps	(Gls)
1997–2001	Real España		(5)
2001–2002	Marathon	40	(8)
2002	Motagua		(3)
2003–2004	Real España		(5)
2005	Platense		(2)
2005	Vida		(7)
2006–2009	Marathon	65	(17)
2009–2012	Victoria	66	(11)
2012	Vida	8	(0)

International career
2000–2008	Honduras	18	(3)
- * Club domestic league appearances and goals as of 2009-12-10

Carlos Alberto Oliva Argueta (born 28 July 1979) is a retired Honduran football player who currently works as an evangelical pastor.

== Club career ==
Oliva started his career at Real C.D. España, where he debuted on 21 February 1998 against Club Deportivo Olimpia. He went on to score 50 goals in the league for several clubs over a 10-year period until 2009.

He joined C.D. Victoria in the summer of 2009 only to return to C.D.S. Vida a year later. He retired in December 2012.

== International career ==
Oliva played at the 1999 FIFA World Youth Championship in Nigeria.

He made his senior debut for Honduras in a May 2000 friendly match against Canada and has earned a total of 18 caps, scoring 3 goals. He has represented his country at the 2007 CONCACAF Gold Cup.

His final international was a February 2008 friendly match against Paraguay.

=== International goals ===
Scores and results list Honduras' goal tally first.

N.	Date	Venue	Opponent	Score	Result	Competition
1.	12 February 2006	Guangdong Olympic Stadium, Guangzhou, China	China	1–0	1–0	Friendly match
2.	24 March 2007	Lockhart Stadium, Fort Lauderdale, United States	El Salvador	1–0	2–0	Friendly match
3.	24 March 2007	Lockhart Stadium, Fort Lauderdale, United States	El Salvador	2–0	2–0	Friendly match

== Evangelical work ==
During his time at Victoria, Oliva led a congregation in La Ceiba, which was moved to Choloma, where he preached every Monday. After retiring as a football player, he worked for the Ministerio Apostólico Avance Misionero.

In August 2015, Oliva led the ceremony at the wedding of national team player Bryan Acosta.
