= Allan Kardeck =

Brazilian footballer (born 1982)

Personal information
- Full name: Allan Kardeck dos Santos Pereira
- Date of birth: May 16, 1982 (age 44)
- Place of birth: Rio de Janeiro, Brazil
- Height: 1.85 m (6 ft 1 in)
- Position: Striker

Team information
- Current team: Real Estelí

Senior career*
Years	Team	Apps	(Gls)
1999	America		
- Goiás
2004	Palmeiras		
2005–2006	Estrela Amadora		
2007	Friburguense		
2008–2009	Olimpia		
2009–2010	Suchitepéquez		(16)
2010–2011	Comunicaciones		(2)
2011–2012	Isidro Metapán	28	(7)
2012–2013	Hibernians	14	(1)
2013–2014	Halcones		
2014–	Real Estelí		
- * Club domestic league appearances and goals

Allan Kardeck dos Santos Pereira also known as Allan Kardeck (born May 16, 1982) is a Brazilian footballer who currently plays for Nicaraguan side Real Estelí.
