= Juan Obelar =

Uruguayan footballer (born 1979)

Personal information
- Full name: Juan Ángel Obelar Pete Gutiérrez
- Date of birth: 12 August 1979 (age 47)
- Place of birth: Mercedes, Uruguay
- Height: 1.90 m (6 ft 3 in)
- Position: Goalkeeper

Team information
- Current team: Fornite FC

Senior career*
Years	Team	Apps	(Gls)
2002–2005	C.A. Peñarol	30	(0)
2003	→ Villa Española (loan)	16	(0)
2006	Tacuarembó F.C.	23	(0)
2007–2009	Marathón	86	(0)
2010	Millonarios	18	(0)
2011–2013	Fénix		
Total		173	(0)
- * Club domestic league appearances and goals

Juan Ángel Obelar (born 12 August 1979) is a Uruguayan retired professional footballer who played as a goalkeeper.

== Club career ==
He was born in Mercedes.

Obelar previously played for C.A. Peñarol, Villa Española and Tacuarembó F.C. in the Primera División Uruguaya. He also played for C.D. Marathón of the Liga Nacional de Honduras and Millonarios in the Colombian Primera A.

Obelar won the Honduran league with Marathón in 2008, leading to a move to Millonarios in 2010. He made a promising start with the Bogotá side, but was relegated to the bench midway through the 2010 season after a poor performance against Cortuluá.

In November 2013, Obelar retired from football after losing four fingers of his left hand in a domestic accident involving a wood plane.
