= Everaldo Ferreira =

Brazilian footballer (born 1982)

Personal information
- Full name: Everaldo Ferreira Magalhaes
- Date of birth: 29 May 1982 (age 44)
- Place of birth: Rondonópolis, Brazil
- Height: 1.78 m (5 ft 10 in)
- Position: Striker

Team information
- Current team: Atlético Choloma
- Number: 11

Senior career*
Years	Team	Apps	(Gls)
2000–2001	River Plate (URU)		
2002–2004	Cerrito		
2005–2006	Olimpia	?	(17)
2006	Cerrito	10	(0)
2007–2008	Real España	44	(35)
2009	Puebla	1	(0)
2009–2010	Olimpia	2	(1)
2011	Municipal		
2011	Deportivo Malacateco		
2012	Atlético Choloma		
2014–2015	Sacachispas		
- * Club domestic league appearances and goals as of 28 December 2008

Everaldo Ferreira Magalhaes (born 29 May 1982) is a Brazilian soccer player.

== Club career ==
He started his career in Honduras in Olimpia. He moved to Uruguay to Cerrito on a loan for 3 months where he was injured. He later moved to Real España. He was the goal leader in Liga Nacional de Futbol de Honduras for the 08-09 Apertura.

He has played for River Plate de Montevideo and Cerrito in Uruguay's Primera División.

Everaldo joined Atlético Choloma for the 2012 Clausura after spending time in Guatemalan football. ferreira is currently playing for Sacachispas of the Guatemalan second division. He is usually regarded by Honduran soccer fans as one of the most talented and deadliest strikers of his generation.
