= Erick Norales =

Honduran football defender (born 1985)

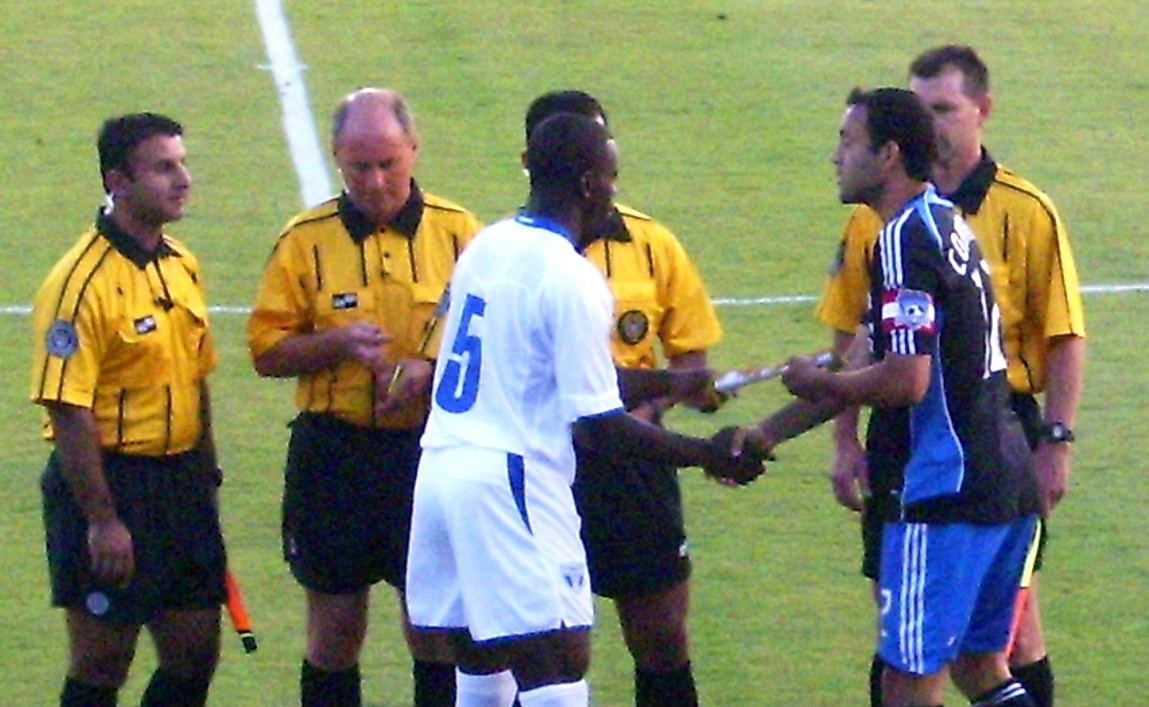
- Erick Norales (white jersey)

Personal information
- Full name: Erick Zenón Norales Casildo
- Date of birth: 11 February 1985 (age 41)
- Place of birth: La Ceiba, Honduras
- Height: 1.80 m (5 ft 11 in)
- Position: Defender

Team information
- Current team: Platense

Senior career*
Years	Team	Apps	(Gls)
2002–2006	Vida	80	(7)
2006–2011	Marathón	118	(11)
2012	Hunan Billows	28	(2)
2013	Marathón	17	(0)
2013	→ Vida (loan)	8	(0)
2014–2015	Indy Eleven	46	(5)
2016	Rayo OKC	0	(0)
2017	Marathón	8	(0)
2017–2018	Platense	43	(2)
2018-2019	Vida	15	(0)

International career
	Honduras U20	8	(1)
2007–2008	Honduras U23	1	(0)
2007–2014	Honduras	32	(2)
- * Club domestic league appearances and goals

Erick Zenón Norales Casildo (Spanish pronunciation: [ˈeɾik noˈɾales]; born 11 February 1985) is a Honduran former footballer.

== Club career ==
Norales began his professional career with C.D.S. Vida in 2002, making eighty league appearances and scoring seven goals. From 2006 to 2011 he appeared in 118 league matches for C.D. Marathón, winning three straight Apertura season titles (2007–2008, 2008–2009, and 2009–2010). He returned to C.D. Vida in 2013, then went back to Marathón for the Liga Nacional's closing season.

On 10 February 2016, Norales signed for the newly formed NASL team Rayo OKC.

== International career ==
He was part of the Honduran U-20 team at the 2005 World Youth Championship in the Netherlands.

He made his senior debut for the national side in an April 2007 friendly match against Haiti and has, as of January 2013, earned a total of 29 caps, scoring 2 goals. He has represented his country in 2 FIFA World Cup qualification matches and played at the 2009, and 2011 UNCAF Nations Cups as well as at the 2009 CONCACAF Gold Cup.

On 20 March 2008 Norales converted the final penalty kick in the semi-finals of the 2008 CONCACAF Olympic Qualifying tournament, to guarantee qualification to the 2008 Olympic Games for Honduras. He would eventually play two matches at the 2008 Summer Olympics.

=== International goals ===
Scores and results list Honduras' goal tally first.

N.	Date	Venue	Opponent	Score	Result	Competition
1.	28 June 2009	WakeMed Soccer Park, Cary, United States	Panama	2–0	2–0	friendly match
2.	7 September 2010	Stade Saputo, Montreal, Canada	Canada	1–1	1–2	friendly match
