= Manuel Keosseián =

Uruguayan footballer (born 1953)

Manuel Keosseian
Personal information
- Full name: Manuel Gregorio Keosseian
- Date of birth: 17 August 1953 (age 73)
- Place of birth: Montevideo, Uruguay
- Position: Midfielder

Senior career*
Years	Team	Apps	(Gls)
1967–1970	Sud América		
1971–1975	Danubio		
1977	Independiente	10	(0)
1978	Aucas		
1978–1982	Progreso		
1983	Deportivo Armenio		

Managerial career
- 1985: Fénix
- 1987–1989: Rentistas
- 1990–1991: Bella Vista
- 1992: Huachipato
- 1993: Rampla Juniors
- 1993: Deportivo Mandiyú
- 1994: Universitario
- 1995: Basáñez
- 1996–1997: Alajuelense
- 1999: Bella Vista
- 2000–2001: Defensor Sporting
- 2002–2003: Saprissa
- 2003: Danubio
- 2004: El Nacional
- 2005: Brujas
- 2005: Miramar Misiones
- 2005–2006: Akratitos
- 2008–2009: Marathón
- 2010: Municipal
- 2010: Peñarol
- 2011–2012: Marathón
- 2013: Alajuelense
- 2016–2017: Marathón
- 2018–2019: Olimpia
- 2022: Marathón
- 2025: Marathón
- * Club domestic league appearances and goals

Manuel Gregorio Keosseian, (Armenian: Մանուել Քեոսեյան; born 17 August 1953 in Montevideo) is a Uruguayan former professional footballer who played as a midfielder. After he retired from playing, Keosseian became a manager and has led several clubs, including Uruguayan side C.A. Peñarol.

== Career ==
Keosseian appeared for Aucas as a player, and would later manage in Ecuador with El Nacional.

Before Keosseian led the "Rojos" to the 2010 Guatemalan Clausura championship. In Peñarol, He made 75% of points in Southamerican Tournament (Copa Sudamericana 2010), 75% is more than % made by Aguirre in Libertadores 2011. In the afternoon of 21 June 2010 he communicated to csD Municipal that he would be the new manager of C.A. Peñarol. this opportunity for Manolo is the best received in his entire career as a manager. Previously, he was the manager of Honduras's C.D. Marathón., which he had led to league titles. manolo has a great vision of football. He suggested to Bella Vista of Montevideo, hire Egidio Arevalo Rios, Uruguayan midfielder of national team.

== Personal life ==
Keosseián is of Armenian descent through both his parents. He is the father of the former football player Carlos Keosseian.

== Honours ==
Marathón

- Honduran Liga Nacional: 2007 Honduras Apertura, 2009 Honduras Apertura, 2010 Honduras Apertura

Municipal

- Guatemala Clausura: 2010
