= 2013–14 Honduran Liga Nacional =

Liga Nacional
- Season: 2013–14
- Dates: 10 August 2013 – 4 May 2014
- Champions: Apertura: Real España; Clausura: Olimpia
- Relegated: Deportes Savio
- Champions League: Real España; Olimpia
- Matches: 200
- Goals: 530 (2.65 per match)
- Top goalscorer: Martínez (24)
- Biggest home win: Olimpia 5–0 Deportes Savio (15 August 2013)
- Biggest away win: Marathón 1–6 Real España (22 March 2014)
- Highest scoring: Deportes Savio 3–4 Victoria (29 September 2013); Olimpia 4–3 Parrillas One (19 October 2013); Marathón 1–6 Real España (22 March 2014)
- Longest unbeaten run: Olimpia (14)
- Longest losing run: Deportes Savio (5); Vida (5)
- All statistics correct as of 4 May 2014.

The 2013–14 Honduran Liga Nacional season was the 48th Honduran Liga Nacional edition, since its establishment in 1965. For this season, the format remained as the previous season. The tournament began on 10 August 2013 and ended on 4 May 2014. Club Deportivo Olimpia was defending the championship after winning the 2012–13 competition.

== 2013–14 teams ==
Location of teams in 2013–14 season

A total of 10 teams will contest the league, including 9 sides from the 2012–13 season plus Parrillas One, promoted from the 2012–13 Liga de Ascenso.

Team	Location	Stadium	Capacity
Deportes Savio	Santa Rosa de Copán	Estadio Sergio Antonio Reyes	3,000
Marathón	San Pedro Sula	Estadio Yankel Rosenthal	15,000
Motagua	Tegucigalpa	Estadio Tiburcio Carías Andino	35,000
Olimpia	Tegucigalpa	Estadio Tiburcio Carías Andino	35,000
Parrillas One	Tela	Estadio León Gómez	3,000
Platense	Puerto Cortés	Estadio Excélsior	7,910
Real España	San Pedro Sula	Estadio Francisco Morazán	26,781
Real Sociedad	Tocoa	Estadio Francisco Martínez Durón	3,000
Victoria	La Ceiba	Estadio Nilmo Edwards	18,000
Vida	La Ceiba	Estadio Nilmo Edwards	18,000

== Apertura ==
=== Regular season ===
==== Standings ====
Pos	Team	Pld	W	D	L	GF	GA	GD	Pts	Qualification or relegation
1	Real Sociedad	18	8	6	4	29	21	+8	30	Qualification to the Semifinals
2	Real España	18	8	5	5	33	26	+7	29	Qualification to the Semifinals
3	Olimpia	18	8	4	6	31	24	+7	28	Qualification to the Second round
4	Deportes Savio	18	6	7	5	25	30	−5	25	Qualification to the Second round
5	Platense	18	6	6	6	24	23	+1	24	Qualification to the Second round
6	Parrillas One	18	7	3	8	26	27	−1	24	Qualification to the Second round
7	Victoria	18	7	3	8	25	26	−1	24	
8	Vida	18	6	5	7	28	32	−4	23	
9	Motagua	18	5	6	7	25	27	−2	21	
10	Marathón	18	4	5	9	20	30	−10	17	

Updated to match(es) played on 10 November 2013. Source:

==== Results ====
Updated 10 November 2013

Home \ Away	SAV	MAR	MOT	OLI	PAR	PLA	RES	RSO	VIC	VID
Deportes Savio		2–2	1–0	2–2	2–1	4–2	2–2	0–0	3–4	1–1
Marathón	1–2		1–1	0–2	2–1	0–0	2–0	2–4	0–2	0–1
Motagua	0–1	3–2		2–1	0–0	2–2	2–1	3–3	1–1	4–2
Olimpia	5–0	3–0	2–1		4–3	1–1	0–2	1–1	2–1	3–0
Parrillas One	1–1	3–1	1–2	0–1		3–0	3–2	2–1	1–0	1–2
Platense	1–0	0–0	1–0	3–1	3–1		2–3	4–0	0–1	3–2
Real España	2–3	1–1	2–0	3–1	4–1	1–1		3–1	3–1	2–2
Real Sociedad	1–1	2–1	1–1	2–0	0–1	2–0	3–0		2–0	2–0
Victoria	3–0	1–2	3–2	1–1	1–1	1–0	0–1	0–2		3–2
Vida	2–0	2–3	2–1	2–1	1–2	1–1	1–1	2–2	3–2	

Source: Soccerway
Legend: Blue = home team win; Yellow = draw; Red = away team win.

=== Postseason ===
Second Round
4	Deportes Savio	5	1	6
5	Platense	1	2	3
3	Olimpia	0	2	2
6	Parrillas One	1	0	1

Semifinals
1	Real Sociedad	0	3	3
4	Deportes Savio	2	1	3
2	Real España	0	1	1
3	Olimpia	0	1	1

Finals
1	Real Sociedad	1	2	3 (1)
2	Real España	3	0	3 (3)

==== Playoffs ====
===== Olimpia v Parrillas One =====
13 November 2013
15:00 (UTC−06:00)
1st leg

Parrillas One	1–0	Olimpia
Castellanos 82'	Report

Estadio León Gómez
Tela, Atlántida
Referee: Erick Andino

Parrillas One	Olimpia

GK	27	(Honduras) Mario Flores
DF	18	(Honduras) Arnol Solórzano
DF	19	(Honduras) Allan Rivas
DF	30	(Honduras) Porciano Ávila
DF	–	(Honduras) Luis Guzmán
MF	26	(Honduras) Óscar Bonilla
MF	–	(Honduras) Selvin Castellanos
MF	–	(Honduras) Jonathan Posas
FW	7	(Honduras) Juan Rodríguez	(substituted off) 79'
FW	17	(Honduras) Horacio Parham	(substituted off) 75'
FW	–	(Honduras) Luis Lobo
Substitutions:
MF	14	(Honduras) Anael Figueroa	(substituted on) 75'
FW	9	(Honduras) Héctor Flores	(substituted on) 79'
Manager:
(Honduras) Luis Cálix

GK	28	(Honduras) Donis Escober
DF	3	(Honduras) Henry Bermúdez
DF	15	(Honduras) Nery Medina
DF	25	(Honduras) Javier Portillo
MF	7	(Honduras) Carlos Mejía
MF	22	(Honduras) José Arévalo
MF	24	(Honduras) Mariano Acevedo
MF	26	(Honduras) Rigoberto Padilla	(substituted off) 30'
FW	9	(Honduras) Anthony Lozano	(substituted off) 60'
FW	20	(Honduras) Irvin Reyna
FW	33	(Uruguay) Ramiro Bruschi	(substituted off) 56'
Substitutions:
MF	23	(Honduras) Hendry Córdova	(substituted on) 30'
FW	21	(Honduras) Roger Rojas	(substituted on) 56'
DF	14	(Honduras) José Fonseca	(substituted on) 60'
Manager:
(Honduras) Óscar Salgado

17 November 2013
16:00 (UTC−06:00)
2nd leg

Olimpia	2–0	Parrillas One
Acevedo 18'; Bruschi 46'	Report

Estadio Tiburcio Carías Andino
Tegucigalpa, Francisco Morazán

Olimpia	Parrillas One

GK	28	(Honduras) Donis Escober
DF	3	(Honduras) Henry Bermúdez
DF	14	(Honduras) José Fonseca
DF	15	(Honduras) Nery Medina
MF	7	(Honduras) Carlos Mejía
MF	19	(Honduras) Luis Garrido	(yellow card) 70' (red card)
MF	22	(Honduras) José Arévalo
MF	24	(Honduras) Mariano Acevedo
MF	26	(Honduras) Rigoberto Padilla	(substituted off) 33'
FW	21	(Honduras) Roger Rojas	(substituted off) 72'
FW	33	(Uruguay) Ramiro Bruschi	(substituted off) 63'
Substitutions:
MF	8	(Honduras) Reynaldo Tilguath	(substituted on) 33'
FW	9	(Honduras) Anthony Lozano	(substituted on) 63'
MF	23	(Honduras) Hendry Córdova	(substituted on) 72'
Manager:
(Honduras) Óscar Salgado

GK	27	(Honduras) Mario Flores
DF	18	(Honduras) Arnol Solórzano
DF	19	(Honduras) Allan Rivas
DF	30	(Honduras) Porciano Ávila
DF	–	(Honduras) Luis Guzmán	(substituted off) 58'
MF	21	(Honduras) Johny Gómez	(substituted off) 42'
MF	26	(Honduras) Óscar Bonilla
MF	–	(Honduras) Selvin Castellanos
MF	–	(Honduras) Jonathan Posas
FW	7	(Honduras) Juan Rodríguez	(substituted off) 63'
FW	–	(Honduras) Luis Lobo
Substitutions:
FW	17	(Honduras) Horacio Parham	(substituted on) 42'
MF	14	(Honduras) Anael Figueroa	(substituted on) 58'
FW	–	(Honduras) Jefferson Bernárdez	(substituted on) 63'
Manager:
(Honduras) Luis Cálix

- Olimpia won 2–1 on aggregate score.

===== Deportes Savio v Platense =====
13 November 2013
19:30 (UTC−06:00)
1st leg

Platense	1–5	Deportes Savio
Tinoco 45+5' (o.g.)	Report	Pinto 13'; Galdámez 54'; Estupiñán 58' (o.g.); Zúniga 84'; Ramírez 87'

Estadio Excélsior
Puerto Cortés, Cortés
Referee: Melvin Matamoros

Platense	Deportes Savio

GK	24	(Honduras) José Pineda
DF	23	(Honduras) Irbin Guerrero	(yellow card) 25'
DF	–	(Belize) Elroy Smith
DF	–	(Honduras) Luis Palacios
DF	–	(Honduras) Edgar Álvarez	(substituted off) 72'
MF	10	(Honduras) Julio de León	(yellow card) 24'	(yellow card) (red card)
MF	16	(Honduras) Jorge Cardona
MF	–	(Honduras) Ronmel Corea	(substituted off) 69'
MF	–	(Honduras) David Mendoza
FW	3	(Colombia) Javier Estupiñán
FW	–	(Honduras) José Casildo	(substituted off) 70'
Substitutions:
MF	–	(Honduras) Joshua Vargas	(substituted on) 69'
FW	27	(Honduras) Jerrick Díaz	(substituted on) 70'
MF	49	(Honduras) Jean Maldonado	(substituted on) 72'
Manager:
(Honduras) Guillermo Bernárdez

GK	29	(Honduras) Kelvin Castillo
DF	4	(Honduras) Pastor Martínez
DF	5	(Honduras) Johny Galdámez
DF	25	(Honduras) Selvin Tinoco
MF	8	(Honduras) Óscar Fortín
MF	14	(Honduras) Óliver Morazán
MF	16	(Brazil) Romario Pinto	(substituted off) 74'
MF	17	(Colombia) Jhovani Lasso	(substituted off) 50'
MF	22	(Honduras) Clayvin Zúniga	(substituted off) 86'
MF	26	(Honduras) Jesús Munguía	(yellow card) 43'
FW	21	(Honduras) Luis Ramírez
Substitutions:
MF	7	(Brazil) Marcelo Souza	(substituted on) 50'
FW	9	(Honduras) Maynor Cabrera	(substituted on) 74'
FW	11	(Honduras) Aly Arriola	(substituted on) 86'
Manager:
(Honduras) Mauro Reyes

17 November 2013
15:00 (UTC−06:00)
2nd leg

Deportes Savio	1–2	Platense
Lasso 78'	Report	Guerrero 63'; Estupiñán 88'

Estadio Sergio Antonio Reyes
Santa Rosa de Copán, Copán

Deportes Savio	Platense

GK	29	(Honduras) Kelvin Castillo
DF	4	(Honduras) Pastor Martínez
DF	5	(Honduras) Johny Galdámez
DF	25	(Honduras) Selvin Tinoco
MF	7	(Brazil) Marcelo Souza	(substituted off) 58'
MF	8	(Honduras) Óscar Fortín
MF	14	(Honduras) Óliver Morazán
MF	16	(Brazil) Romario Pinto	(yellow card) 4'	(substituted off) 53'
MF	22	(Honduras) Clayvin Zúniga
FW	9	(Honduras) Maynor Cabrera	(substituted off) 77'
FW	21	(Honduras) Luis Ramírez
Substitutions:
MF	26	(Honduras) Jesús Munguía	(substituted on) 53'
MF	17	(Colombia) Jhovani Lasso	(substituted on) 58'
FW	11	(Honduras) Aly Arriola	(substituted on) 77'
Manager:
(Honduras) Mauro Reyes

GK	24	(Honduras) José Pineda
DF	8	(Honduras) Jaime Rosales
DF	–	(Honduras) Luis Palacios
DF	–	(Honduras) Odis Borjas
MF	15	(Honduras) Bani Lozano	(substituted off) 70'
MF	16	(Honduras) Jorge Cardona	(substituted off) 46'
MF	20	(Honduras) Walter Hernández	(yellow card) 16'
MF	–	(Honduras) Ronmel Corea	(substituted off) 60'
MF	–	(Honduras) David Mendoza	(yellow card) 23'
FW	2	(Honduras) Nahún Solís
FW	27	(Honduras) Jerrick Díaz
Substitutions:
DF	–	(Belize) Elroy Smith	(substituted on) 46'
DF	23	(Honduras) Irbin Guerrero	(substituted on) 60'
FW	3	(Colombia) Javier Estupiñán	(substituted on) 70'
Manager:
(Honduras) Guillermo Bernárdez

- Deportes Savio won 6–3 on aggregate score.

==== Semifinals ====
===== Real Sociedad v Deportes Savio =====
22 November 2013
19:00 (UTC−06:00)
1st leg

Deportes Savio	2–0	Real Sociedad
Pinto 37'; Galdámez 67'	Report

Estadio Sergio Antonio Reyes
Santa Rosa de Copán, Copán
Attendance: 1,658
Referee: Armando Castro

Deportes Savio	Real Sociedad

GK	29	(Honduras) Kelvin Castillo
DF	4	(Honduras) Pastor Martínez
DF	5	(Honduras) Johny Galdámez
DF	25	(Honduras) Selvin Tinoco
MF	8	(Honduras) Óscar Fortín
MF	14	(Honduras) Óliver Morazán
MF	16	(Brazil) Romario Pinto	(substituted off) 81'
MF	17	(Colombia) Jhovani Lasso	(substituted off) 88'
MF	22	(Honduras) Clayvin Zúniga	(red card) 41'
FW	9	(Honduras) Maynor Cabrera
FW	21	(Honduras) Luis Ramírez	(substituted off) 64'
Substitutions:
MF	26	(Honduras) Jesús Munguía	(substituted on) 64'
FW	11	(Honduras) Aly Arriola	(substituted on) 81'
DF	18	(Honduras) Vicente Solórzano	(substituted on) 88'
Manager:
(Honduras) Mauro Reyes

GK	1	(Honduras) Sandro Cárcamo
DF	4	(Honduras) Dilmer Gutiérrez
DF	5	(Honduras) Carlos Palacios
DF	6	(Honduras) José Barralaga	(substituted off) 61'
DF	17	(Honduras) Osman Melgares
DF	18	(Honduras) Henrry Clark
DF	19	(Honduras) José Tobías
MF	13	(Honduras) Sergio Peña
MF	20	(Honduras) Elkin González	Yellow card
MF	21	(Honduras) Wilson Güity	(substituted off) 57'
FW	11	(Honduras) Rony Martínez
Substitutions:
MF	10	(Honduras) César Zelaya	(substituted on) 57'
FW	22	(Honduras) Diego Reyes	(substituted on) 61'
Manager:
(Honduras) Héctor Castellón

1 December 2013
14:00 (UTC−06:00)
2nd leg

Real Sociedad	3–1	Deportes Savio
González 21' (pen.) 49' (pen.); Clark 90+8' (pen.)	Report	61' (o.g.) Gutiérrez

Estadio Francisco Martínez Durón
Tocoa, Colón
Referee: Orlando Hernández

Real Sociedad	Deportes Savio

GK	1	(Honduras) Sandro Cárcamo
DF	4	(Honduras) Dilmer Gutiérrez
DF	5	(Honduras) Carlos Palacios
DF	17	(Honduras) Osman Melgares	(substituted off) 71'
DF	18	(Honduras) Henrry Clark
DF	19	(Honduras) José Tobías
MF	10	(Honduras) César Zelaya
MF	13	(Honduras) Sergio Peña	(substituted off) 80'
MF	20	(Honduras) Elkin González	(substituted off) 74'
FW	11	(Honduras) Rony Martínez
FW	22	(Honduras) Diego Reyes
Substitutions:
FW	7	(Honduras) Henry Martínez	(substituted on) 71'
–	–	(Honduras) Juan Munguía	(substituted on) 74'
MF	21	(Honduras) Wilson Güity	(substituted on) 80'
Manager:
(Honduras) Héctor Castellón

GK	29	(Honduras) Kelvin Castillo
DF	4	(Honduras) Pastor Martínez
DF	5	(Honduras) Johny Galdámez
DF	25	(Honduras) Selvin Tinoco
MF	8	(Honduras) Óscar Fortín
MF	14	(Honduras) Óliver Morazán
MF	16	(Brazil) Romario Pinto
MF	17	(Colombia) Jhovani Lasso	(substituted off) 73'
MF	26	(Honduras) Jesús Munguía	(substituted off) 57'
FW	9	(Honduras) Maynor Cabrera	(substituted off) 59'
FW	21	(Honduras) Luis Ramírez	(yellow card) 26'
Substitutions:
FW	15	(Honduras) Ángel Pineda	(substituted on) 57'
MF	7	(Brazil) Marcelo Souza	(substituted on) 59'
FW	11	(Honduras) Aly Arriola	(substituted on) 73'
Manager:
(Honduras) Mauro Reyes

- Real Sociedad 3–3 Deportes Savio on aggregate score; Real Sociedad advanced on regular season record.

===== Real España v Olimpia =====
27 November 2013
19:00 (UTC−06:00)
1st leg

Olimpia	0–0	Real España
	Report

Estadio Tiburcio Carías Andino
Tegucigalpa, Francisco Morazán
Referee: Geovanny Mendoza

Olimpia	Real España

GK	27	(Honduras) Noel Valladares	(yellow card) 77'
DF	3	(Honduras) Henry Bermúdez
DF	5	(Honduras) Brayan Beckeles	(yellow card) 77'
DF	14	(Honduras) José Fonseca
MF	7	(Honduras) Carlos Mejía
MF	22	(Honduras) José Arévalo
MF	24	(Honduras) Mariano Acevedo
MF	26	(Honduras) Rigoberto Padilla	(yellow card) 12'	(substituted off) 53'
FW	9	(Honduras) Anthony Lozano	(yellow card) 44'	(substituted off) 60'
FW	20	(Honduras) Irvin Reyna	(substituted off) 74'
FW	33	(Uruguay) Ramiro Bruschi
Substitutions:
MF	8	(Honduras) Reynaldo Tilguath	(substituted on) 53'
FW	21	(Honduras) Roger Rojas	(substituted on) 60'
MF	32	(Honduras) Jairo Puerto	(substituted on) 74'
Manager:
(Honduras) Óscar Salgado

GK	22	(Honduras) Luis López
DF	2	(Honduras) Marlon Peña
DF	5	(Honduras) Wilfredo Barahona	(substituted off) 46'
DF	21	(Honduras) Daniel Tejeda
DF	33	(Honduras) Harlinton Guitérrez
MF	6	(Honduras) Bryan Acosta	(yellow card) 35'
MF	8	(Uruguay) Julio Rodríguez
MF	10	(Honduras) Mario Martínez	(yellow card) 83'	(substituted off) 84'
MF	23	(Honduras) Edder Delgado
FW	9	(Uruguay) Claudio Cardozo
FW	–	(Costa Rica) Allan Alemán	(yellow card) 57'	(substituted off) 78'
Substitutions:
DF	4	(Honduras) Hilder Colón	(substituted on) 46'	(yellow card) 65'
FW	7	(Honduras) Franco Güity	(substituted on) 78'
MF	38	(Honduras) Jhow Benavídez	(substituted on) 84'
Manager:
(Costa Rica) Hernán Medford

1 December 2013
16:30 (UTC−06:00)
2nd leg

Real España	1–1	Olimpia
Güity 82'	Report	86' Rojas

Estadio Francisco Morazán
San Pedro Sula, Cortés
Referee: Óscar Moncada

Real España	Olimpia

GK	22	(Honduras) Luis López
DF	2	(Honduras) Marlon Peña
DF	5	(Honduras) Wilfredo Barahona
DF	21	(Honduras) Daniel Tejeda
DF	33	(Honduras) Hárlinton Gutiérrez
MF	6	(Honduras) Bryan Acosta	(yellow card) 26'
MF	8	(Uruguay) Julio Rodríguez
MF	10	(Honduras) Mario Martínez	(substituted off) 81'
MF	23	(Honduras) Edder Delgado
FW	9	(Uruguay) Claudio Cardozo	(substituted off) 55'
FW	–	(Costa Rica) Allan Alemán	(substituted off) 72'
Substitutions:
FW	35	(Honduras) Bryan Róchez	(substituted on) 55'
MF	38	(Honduras) Jhow Benavídez	(substituted on) 72'
FW	7	(Honduras) Franco Güity	(substituted on) 81'
Manager:
(Costa Rica) Hernán Medford

GK	28	(Honduras) Donis Escober
DF	3	(Honduras) Henry Bermúdez
DF	5	(Honduras) Brayan Beckeles	(yellow card) 57'
DF	14	(Honduras) José Fonseca
MF	7	(Honduras) Carlos Mejía
MF	8	(Honduras) Reynaldo Tilguath	(substituted off) 53'
MF	19	(Honduras) Luis Garrido
MF	22	(Honduras) José Arévalo
MF	24	(Honduras) Mariano Acevedo
FW	18	(Brazil) Douglas Caetano	(substituted off) 69'
FW	33	(Uruguay) Ramiro Bruschi	(substituted off) 61'
Substitutions:
MF	–	(Honduras) Néstor Martínez	(substituted on) 53'
FW	21	(Honduras) Roger Rojas	(substituted on) 61'
FW	9	(Honduras) Anthony Lozano	(substituted on) 69'
Manager:
(Honduras) Óscar Salgado

- Real España 1–1 Olimpia on aggregate score; Real España advanced on regular season record.

==== Final ====
===== Real Sociedad v Real España =====
8 December 2013
16:30 (UTC−06:00)
1st leg

Real España	3–1	Real Sociedad
Róchez 14' 32'; Cardozo 62'	Report	58' (pen.) González

Estadio Francisco Morazán
San Pedro Sula, Cortés
Referee: Armando Castro

Real España	Real Sociedad

GK	22	(Honduras) Luis López
DF	2	(Honduras) Marlon Peña
DF	5	(Honduras) Wilfredo Barahona
DF	33	(Honduras) Hárlinton Gutiérrez
MF	6	(Honduras) Bryan Acosta
MF	8	(Uruguay) Julio Rodríguez	(yellow card) 39'
MF	10	(Honduras) Mario Martínez	(substituted off) 73'
MF	23	(Honduras) Edder Delgado
FW	9	(Uruguay) Claudio Cardozo
FW	35	(Honduras) Bryan Róchez	(substituted off) 84'
FW	11	(Costa Rica) Allan Alemán	(substituted off) 78'
Substitutions:
FW	7	(Honduras) Franco Güity	(substituted on) 73'
MF	8	(Honduras) Jhow Benavídez	(substituted on) 78'
FW	17	(Honduras) Juan Mejía	(substituted on) 84'
Manager:
(Costa Rica) Hernán Medford

GK	1	(Honduras) Sandro Cárcamo
DF	5	(Honduras) Carlos Palacios
DF	4	(Honduras) Dilmer Gutiérrez
DF	17	(Honduras) Osman Melgares	(substituted off) 79'
DF	18	(Honduras) Henrry Clark
MF	13	(Honduras) Sergio Peña
MF	20	(Honduras) Elkin González
MF	21	(Honduras) Wilson Güity	(substituted off) 69'
MF	30	(Honduras) José Williams
FW	11	(Honduras) Rony Martínez
FW	22	(Honduras) Diego Reyes	(substituted off) 73'
Substitutions:
FW	–	(Honduras) Juan Munguía	(substituted on) 69'
MF	10	(Honduras) César Zelaya	(substituted on) 73'
FW	7	(Honduras) Henry Martínez	(substituted on) 79'
Manager:
(Honduras) Héctor Castellón

15 December 2013
14:00 (UTC−06:00)
2nd leg

Real Sociedad	2–0	Real España
González 45+3' (pen.); Martínez 90+1'	Report
Penalties
Clark (penalty scored); Melgares (penalty missed); R. Martínez (penalty missed); H. Martínez (penalty missed)	1–3	(penalty scored) Rodríguez; (penalty scored) Rodas; (penalty scored) Acosta; (penalty missed) Mejía

Estadio Francisco Martínez Durón
Tocoa, Colón
Referee: Melvin Matamoros

Real Sociedad	Real España

GK	1	(Honduras) Sandro Cárcamo
DF	4	(Honduras) Dilmer Gutiérrez
DF	5	(Honduras) Carlos Palacios
DF	17	(Honduras) Osman Melgares
DF	18	(Honduras) Henrry Clark
MF	10	(Honduras) César Zelaya
MF	13	(Honduras) Sergio Peña	(yellow card) 87'
MF	20	(Honduras) Elkin González	(substituted off) 86'
MF	30	(Honduras) José Williams
FW	11	(Honduras) Rony Martínez
FW	22	(Honduras) Diego Reyes	(substituted off) 75'
Substitutions:
FW	–	(Honduras) Juan Munguía	(substituted on) 75'
MF	21	(Honduras) Wilson Güity	(substituted on) 86'	(yellow card) 118'
Manager:
(Honduras) Héctor Castellón

GK	22	(Honduras) Luis López
DF	2	(Honduras) Marlon Peña
DF	5	(Honduras) Wilfredo Barahona
DF	33	(Honduras) Hárlinton Gutiérrez
MF	6	(Honduras) Bryan Acosta
MF	8	(Uruguay) Julio Rodríguez
MF	10	(Honduras) Mario Martínez	(substituted off) 55'
MF	23	(Honduras) Edder Delgado
FW	9	(Uruguay) Claudio Cardozo	(substituted off) 82'
FW	35	(Honduras) Bryan Róchez
FW	–	(Costa Rica) Allan Alemán	(substituted off) 13'
Substitutions:
MF	8	(Honduras) Jhow Benavídez	(substituted on) 13'
MF	12	(Honduras) Gerson Rodas	(substituted on) 55'
FW	17	(Honduras) Juan Mejía	(substituted on) 82'
Manager:
(Costa Rica) Hernán Medford

- Real Sociedad 3–3 Real España on aggregate score; Real España won 1–3 on penalty shoot-outs.

== Clausura ==
=== Regular season ===
==== Standings ====
Pos	Team	Pld	W	D	L	GF	GA	GD	Pts	Qualification or relegation
1	Olimpia	18	9	5	4	29	18	+11	32	Qualification to the Semifinals
2	Real Sociedad	18	9	4	5	32	21	+11	31	Qualification to the Semifinals
3	Real España	18	7	9	2	36	24	+12	30	Qualification to the Second round
4	Motagua	18	8	5	5	20	16	+4	29	Qualification to the Second round
5	Marathón	18	6	6	6	22	25	−3	24	Qualification to the Second round
6	Victoria	18	5	8	5	17	20	−3	23	Qualification to the Second round
7	Parrillas One	18	4	8	6	25	28	−3	20	
8	Platense	18	3	11	4	11	16	−5	20	
9	Vida	18	5	3	10	20	28	−8	18	
10	Deportes Savio	18	3	3	12	14	30	−16	12	

Updated to match(es) played on 13 April 2014. Source:

==== Results ====
Updated 13 April 2014

Home \ Away	SAV	MAR	MOT	OLI	PAR	PLA	RES	RSO	VIC	VID
Deportes Savio		0–1	0–1	2–3	0–2	0–0	0–2	3–2	2–1	0–2
Marathón	2–3		3–3	0–4	1–1	0–0	1–6	2–0	2–0	0–2
Motagua	1–0	1–1		0–1	0–2	0–0	1–1	1–0	3–0	3–1
Olimpia	2–0	0–3	0–0		2–3	2–0	2–0	1–1	1–1	5–1
Parrillas One	2–2	1–1	1–2	1–1		1–1	3–3	2–4	0–0	2–0
Platense	1–1	1–0	0–1	1–1	1–0		0–1	0–0	0–0	2–2
Real España	2–0	1–1	2–0	2–1	3–3	0–0		3–3	2–2	4–2
Real Sociedad	2–0	0–3	3–2	0–1	2–0	5–1	3–2		4–0	1–0
Victoria	1–0	0–1	1–0	3–1	3–1	1–1	1–1	0–0		3–1
Vida	3–1	2–0	0–1	0–1	2–0	1–2	1–1	0–2	0–0	

Source: Soccerway
Legend: Blue = home team win; Yellow = draw; Red = away team win.
- Marathón–Real España suspended at '75 (1–6) as Marathón abandoned the game. Result stood.

=== Postseason ===
==== Playoffs ====
===== Real España v Victoria =====
16 April 2014
19:00 (UTC−06:00)
1st leg

Victoria	2–1	Real España
Elvir 26' 35'	Report	17' Acosta

Estadio Nilmo Edwards
La Ceiba, Atlántida
Referee: Raúl Castro

Victoria	Real España

GK	23	(Honduras) John Bodden
DF	5	(Honduras) José Velásquez	(yellow card) 34'
DF	15	(Honduras) Édgar Flores
DF	33	(Honduras) Samuel Córdova
DF	–	(Argentina) Leonardo Domínguez
MF	7	(Honduras) Diktmar Hernández	(substituted off) 85'
MF	16	(Honduras) Héctor Castellanos	(yellow card) 23'
MF	–	(Honduras) Alan Gutiérrez
MF	–	(Honduras) Erick Andino
FW	4	(Honduras) Rubén Licona	(substituted off) 71'
FW	29	(Honduras) Fredixon Elvir	(substituted off) 71'
Substitutions:
FW	–	(Argentina) Héctor Morales	(substituted on) 71'
FW	–	(Honduras) Rony Flores	(substituted on) 71'
MF	18	(Honduras) Bryan Martínez	(substituted on) 85'
Manager:
(Honduras) Carlos Martínez

GK	22	(Honduras) Luis López
DF	2	(Honduras) Marlon Peña
DF	5	(Honduras) Wilfredo Barahona
DF	19	(Honduras) Sergio Mendoza
MF	6	(Honduras) Bryan Acosta
MF	10	(Honduras) Mario Martínez	(substituted off) 77'
MF	12	(Honduras) Gerson Rodas
MF	23	(Honduras) Edder Delgado
FW	35	(Honduras) Bryan Róchez	(substituted off) 73'
FW	–	(Costa Rica) Allan Alemán	(substituted off) 77'
FW	–	(Honduras) Carlo Costly
Substitutions:
FW	9	(Uruguay) Claudio Cardozo	(substituted on) 73'
MF	38	(Honduras) Jhow Benavídez	(substituted on) 77'
FW	–	(Panama) Omar Jaén	(substituted on) 77'
Manager:
(Costa Rica) Hernán Medford

19 April 2014
19:00 (UTC−06:00)
2nd leg

Real España	1–2	Victoria
Costly 10'	Report	65' 90+4' Flores

Estadio Francisco Morazán
San Pedro Sula, Cortés
Referee: Orlando Hernández

Real España	Victoria

GK	22	(Honduras) Luis López	(substituted off) 72'
DF	2	(Honduras) Marlon Peña	(yellow card) 62'
DF	5	(Honduras) Wilfredo Barahona	(yellow card) 90'
DF	19	(Honduras) Sergio Mendoza
MF	6	(Honduras) Bryan Acosta
MF	8	(Uruguay) Julio Rodríguez	(substituted off) 36'
MF	10	(Honduras) Mario Martínez	(yellow card) 33'
MF	23	(Honduras) Edder Delgado
FW	9	(Uruguay) Claudio Cardozo	(substituted off) 56'
FW	–	(Costa Rica) Allan Alemán
FW	–	(Honduras) Carlo Costly
Substitutions:
MF	12	(Honduras) Gerson Rodas	(substituted on) 36'
FW	35	(Honduras) Bryan Róchez	(substituted on) 56'
GK	1	(Honduras) Kevin Hernández	(substituted on) 72'
Manager:
(Costa Rica) Hernán Medford

GK	23	(Honduras) John Bodden	(yellow card) 50'
DF	5	(Honduras) José Velásquez
DF	15	(Honduras) Édgar Flores
DF	33	(Honduras) Samuel Córdova
DF	–	(Argentina) Leonardo Domínguez
MF	7	(Honduras) Diktmar Hernández
MF	16	(Honduras) Héctor Castellanos	(yellow card) 24'
MF	–	(Honduras) Alan Gutiérrez	(yellow card) 40'	(substituted off) 60'
MF	–	(Honduras) Erick Andino	(yellow card) 70'	(substituted off) 75'
FW	29	(Honduras) Fredixon Elvir	(yellow card) 45'
FW	–	(Argentina) Héctor Morales	(substituted off) 82'
Substitutions:
FW	–	(Honduras) Rony Flores	(substituted on) 60'
DF	–	(Honduras) Julián Rápalo	(substituted on) 75'
MF	8	(Honduras) Efraín López	(substituted on) 82'
Manager:
(Honduras) Carlos Martínez

- Victoria won 4–2 on aggregate score.

===== Motagua v Marathón =====
16 April 2014
19:00 (UTC−06:00)
1st leg

Marathón	2–1	Motagua
Espinoza 24'; Guevara 78'	Report	42' Elvir

Estadio Francisco Morazán
San Pedro Sula, Cortés
Referee: Saíd Martínez

Marathón	Motagua

GK	27	(Honduras) Yul Arzú
DF	22	(Honduras) Johnny Barrios
DF	23	(Honduras) Mauricio Sabillón
DF	26	(Honduras) Roy Posas	(yellow card) 45'
DF	24	(Uruguay) Luis Maldonado
MF	8	(Honduras) Kevin Espinoza	(substituted off) 66'
MF	17	(Honduras) Wilmer Fuentes
MF	28	(Honduras) Óscar Bonilla
MF	12	(Honduras) Alfredo Mejía	(substituted off) 66'
FW	13	(Honduras) Mitchel Brown	(substituted off) 82'
FW	11	(Honduras) Diego Reyes
Substitutions:
MF	20	(Honduras) Amado Guevara	(substituted on) 66'
DF	30	(Honduras) Ian Osorio	(substituted on) 66'
FW	21	(Honduras) Luis Ramírez	(substituted on) 82'
Manager:
(Uruguay) Manuel Keosseián

GK	1	(Argentina) Sebastián Portigliatti
DF	3	(Honduras) Henry Figueroa
DF	4	(Honduras) Júnior Izaguirre	(yellow card) 67'
DF	18	(Honduras) Wilmer Crisanto
DF	24	(Honduras) Omar Elvir	(substituted off) 69'
DF	27	(Honduras) Orlin Peralta
MF	10	(Uruguay) Maximiliano Lombardi
MF	12	(Honduras) Reinieri Mayorquín	(substituted off) 67'
MF	14	(Honduras) Irvin Reyna
FW	11	(Argentina) Eduardo Sosa	(substituted off) 74'
FW	22	(Uruguay) José Varela
Substitutions:
MF	9	(Honduras) Jorge Claros	(substituted on) 67'
DF	16	(Colombia) Luis Castro	(substituted on) 69'
FW	9	(Honduras) Román Castillo	(substituted on) 74'
Manager:
(Argentina) Diego Vásquez

20 April 2014
16:00 (UTC−06:00)
2nd leg

Motagua	0–0	Marathón
Lombardi (penalty missed)	Report

Estadio Tiburcio Carías Andino
Tegucigalpa, Francisco Morazán
Referee: Manuel Zelaya

Motagua	Marathón

GK	1	(Argentina) Sebastián Portigliatti
DF	3	(Honduras) Henry Figueroa
DF	4	(Honduras) Júnior Izaguirre	(yellow card) 67'
DF	18	(Honduras) Wilmer Crisanto
DF	24	(Honduras) Omar Elvir	(substituted off) 58'
DF	27	(Honduras) Orlin Peralta
MF	14	(Honduras) Irvin Reyna	(yellow card) 40'
MF	10	(Uruguay) Maximiliano Lombardi
MF	12	(Honduras) Reinieri Mayorquín	(yellow card) 30'	(substituted off) 55'
FW	11	(Argentina) Eduardo Sosa
FW	22	(Uruguay) José Varela
Substitutions:
MF	7	(Honduras) Carlos Discua	(substituted on) 55'
FW	9	(Honduras) Román Castillo	(substituted on) 58'	(yellow card) 68'
Manager:
(Argentina) Diego Vásquez

GK	27	(Honduras) Yul Arzú
DF	22	(Honduras) Johnny Barrios	(substituted off) 15'
DF	23	(Honduras) Mauricio Sabillón	(yellow card) 44'
DF	26	(Honduras) Roy Posas
DF	–	(Uruguay) Luis Maldonado	(yellow card) 85'
MF	8	(Honduras) Kevin Espinoza	(substituted off) 56'
MF	17	(Honduras) Wilmer Fuentes
MF	–	(Honduras) Óscar Bonilla
MF	–	(Honduras) Alfredo Mejía	(yellow card) 55'
FW	–	(Honduras) Mitchel Brown	(yellow card) 60'
FW	–	(Honduras) Diego Reyes	(substituted off) 89'
Substitutions:
DF	–	(Uruguay) Sergio Bica	(substituted on) 15'
DF	30	(Honduras) Ian Osorio	(substituted on) 56'
MF	7	(Honduras) Emil Martínez	(substituted on) 89'
Manager:
(Uruguay) Manuel Keosseián

- Marathón won 2–1 on aggregate score.

==== Semifinals ====
===== Olimpia v Victoria =====
24 April 2014
19:00 (UTC−06:00)
1st leg

Victoria	0–1	Olimpia
	Report	1' Quioto

Estadio Nilmo Edwards
La Ceiba, Atlántida
Referee: Héctor Rodríguez

Victoria	Olimpia

GK	23	(Honduras) John Bodden
DF	5	(Honduras) José Velásquez	(yellow card) 40'
DF	15	(Honduras) Édgar Flores	(substituted off) 69'
DF	33	(Honduras) Samuel Córdova
DF	–	(Argentina) Leonardo Domínguez
MF	7	(Honduras) Diktmar Hernández
MF	16	(Honduras) Héctor Castellanos	(yellow card) 51'	(substituted off) 61'
MF	–	(Honduras) Alan Gutiérrez	(substituted off) 46'
MF	–	(Honduras) Erick Andino
FW	4	(Honduras) Rubén Licona
FW	29	(Honduras) Fredixon Elvir
Substitutions:
FW	–	(Honduras) Rony Flores	(substituted on) 46'
DF	–	(Honduras) Julián Rápalo	(substituted on) 61'
FW	–	(Argentina) Héctor Morales	(substituted on) 69'
Manager:
(Honduras) Carlos Martínez

GK	27	(Honduras) Noel Valladares
DF	3	(Honduras) Henry Bermúdez	(substituted off) 73'
DF	4	(Brazil) Fábio de Souza
DF	5	(Honduras) Brayan Beckeles
DF	14	(Honduras) José Fonseca
MF	7	(Honduras) Carlos Mejía	(substituted off) 58'
MF	19	(Honduras) Luis Garrido	Red card
MF	25	(Honduras) Javier Portillo
MF	–	(Honduras) David Meza	(yellow card) 45'
FW	21	(Honduras) Roger Rojas	(substituted off) 54'
FW	–	(Honduras) Romell Quioto
Substitutions:
FW	9	(Honduras) Anthony Lozano	(substituted on) 54'
MF	26	(Honduras) Óliver Morazán	(substituted on) 58'
MF	24	(Honduras) Mariano Acevedo	(substituted on) 73'
Manager:
(Argentina) Héctor Vargas

27 April 2014
17:00 (UTC−06:00)
2nd leg

Olimpia	1–0	Victoria
Rojas 52'	Report

Estadio Tiburcio Carías Andino
Tegucigalpa, Francisco Morazán
Referee: Armando Castro

Olimpia	Victoria

GK	28	(Honduras) Donis Escober
DF	4	(Brazil) Fábio de Souza
DF	5	(Honduras) Brayan Beckeles
DF	14	(Honduras) José Fonseca
MF	24	(Honduras) Mariano Acevedo	(substituted off) 61'
MF	25	(Honduras) Javier Portillo
MF	26	(Honduras) Óliver Morazán	(yellow card) 45'
MF	–	(Honduras) David Meza	(yellow card) 58'
MF	–	(Colombia) Omar Guerra	(substituted off) 46'
FW	9	(Honduras) Anthony Lozano	(substituted off) 81'
FW	–	(Honduras) Romell Quioto
Substitutions:
FW	21	(Honduras) Roger Rojas	(substituted on) 46'
MF	7	(Honduras) Carlos Mejía	(substituted on) 61'
MF	16	(Honduras) Bayron Méndez	(substituted on) 81'
Manager:
(Argentina) Héctor Vargas

GK	23	(Honduras) John Bodden
DF	5	(Honduras) José Velásquez
DF	15	(Honduras) Édgar Flores	(substituted off) 57'
DF	27	(Honduras) Félix Crisanto
DF	33	(Honduras) Samuel Córdova
DF	–	(Argentina) Leonardo Domínguez
DF	–	(Honduras) Julián Rápalo	(substituted off) 55'
MF	16	(Honduras) Héctor Castellanos	(yellow card) 66'
MF	–	(Honduras) Erick Andino	(yellow card) 40'
FW	29	(Honduras) Fredixon Elvir
FW	–	(Honduras) Rony Flores	(substituted off) 46'
Substitutions:
FW	–	(Argentina) Héctor Morales	(substituted on) 46'
MF	7	(Honduras) Diktmar Hernández	(substituted on) 55'
FW	4	(Honduras) Rubén Licona	(substituted on) 57'
Manager:
(Honduras) Carlos Martínez

- Olimpia won 2–0 on aggregate score.

===== Real Sociedad v Marathón =====
24 April 2014
19:00 (UTC−06:00)
1st leg

Marathón	0–0	Real Sociedad
	Report

Estadio Francisco Morazán
San Pedro Sula, Cortés
Referee: Óscar Moncada

Marathón	Real Sociedad

GK	27	(Honduras) Yul Arzú
DF	23	(Honduras) Mauricio Sabillón
DF	24	(Uruguay) Luis Maldonado
DF	26	(Honduras) Roy Posas
DF	29	(Uruguay) Sergio Bica
MF	7	(Honduras) Emil Martínez	(substituted off) 68'
MF	17	(Honduras) Wilmer Fuentes
MF	12	(Honduras) Alfredo Mejía	(substituted off) 60'
MF	28	(Honduras) Óscar Bonilla
FW	11	(Honduras) Diego Reyes
FW	21	(Honduras) Luis Ramírez	(substituted off) 76'
Substitutions:
DF	30	(Honduras) Ian Osorio	(substituted on) 60'
–	–	(Honduras) Jairo Puerto	(substituted on) 68'
FW	–	(Uruguay) Jonathan Techera	(substituted on) 76'
Manager:
(Uruguay) Manuel Keosseián

GK	1	(Honduras) Sandro Cárcamo
DF	4	(Honduras) Dilmer Gutiérrez
DF	5	(Honduras) Carlos Palacios
DF	18	(Honduras) Henry Clark
DF	19	(Honduras) José Tobías
DF	–	(Honduras) José Williams
MF	17	(Honduras) Osman Melgares
MF	20	(Honduras) Elkin González	(substituted off) 61'
MF	–	(Honduras) Jonathan Paz	(substituted off) 77'
MF	–	(Honduras) Sergio Peña
FW	11	(Honduras) Rony Martínez
Substitutions:
–	–	(Honduras) Milton Ruiz	(substituted on) 61'
–	–	(Honduras) Robbie Norales	(substituted on) 77'
–	–	–
Manager:
(Honduras) Héctor Castellón

27 April 2014
14:00 (UTC−06:00)
2nd leg

Real Sociedad	0–1	Marathón
	Report	48' Reyes

Estadio Francisco Martínez Durón
Tocoa, Colón
Referee: Melvin Matamoros

Real Sociedad	Marathón

GK	1	(Honduras) Sandro Cárcamo
RB	–	(Honduras) José Williams	(substituted off) 62'
CB	4	(Honduras) Dilmer Gutiérrez
LB	5	(Honduras) Carlos Palacios
CB	18	(Honduras) Henry Clark
DM	–	(Honduras) José Tobías
DM	–	(Honduras) Sergio Peña
RM	–	(Honduras) Jonathan Paz	(substituted off) 53'
AM	20	(Honduras) Elkin González	(substituted off) 68'
LM	17	(Honduras) Osman Melgares
CF	11	(Honduras) Rony Martínez
Substitutions:
MF	10	(Honduras) César Zalaya	(substituted on) 53'
FW	8	(Honduras) Juan Munguía	(substituted on) 62'
FW	7	(Honduras) Henry Martínez	(substituted on) 68'
Manager:
(Honduras) Héctor Castellón

GK	27	(Honduras) Yull Arzú
RB	23	(Honduras) Mauricio Sabillón
CB	24	(Uruguay) Luis Maldonado
CB	26	(Honduras) Roy Posas
CB	29	(Uruguay) Sergio Bica
LB	28	(Honduras) Óscar Bonilla
DM	17	(Honduras) Wilmer Fuentes	(substituted off) 83'
RM	30	(Honduras) Ian Osorio
LM	7	(Honduras) Emil Martínez	(substituted off) 71'
SS	11	(Honduras) Diego Reyes
CF	13	(Honduras) Mitchel Brown	(substituted off) 78'
Substitutions:
MF	12	(Honduras) Alfredo Mejía	(substituted on) 71'
MF	20	(Honduras) Amado Guevara	(substituted on) 78'
MF	8	(Honduras) Kevin Espinoza	(substituted on) 83'
Manager:
(Uruguay) Manuel Keosseián

- Marathón won 1–0 on aggregate score.

==== Final ====
===== Olimpia v Marathón =====
1 May 2014
17:30 (UTC−06:00)
1st leg

Marathón	0–0	Olimpia
	Report

Estadio Olímpico Metropolitano
San Pedro Sula, Cortés

4 May 2014
17:00 (UTC−06:00)
2nd leg

Olimpia	0–0	Marathón
	Report
Penalties
Guerra (penalty scored); Rojas (penalty scored); Quioto (penalty scored); Meza	4–2	(penalty scored) Maldonado; (penalty missed) Bica; (penalty scored) Bonilla; (penalty missed) Sabillón

Estadio Tiburcio Carías Andino
Tegucigalpa, Francisco Morazán
- Olimpia 0–0 Marathón on aggregate score; Olimpia won 4–2 on penalty shoot-outs.

=== Top goalscorers ===
Updated 4 May 2014

- 24 goals:

(Honduras) Rony Martínez (Real Sociedad)

- 20 goals:

(Honduras) Bryan Róchez (Real España)

- 17 goals:

(Honduras) Roger Rojas (Olimpia)

- 16 goals:

(Honduras) Anthony Lozano (Olimpia)

- 15 goals:

(Colombia) Javier Estupiñán (Platense / Parrillas One)
(Honduras) Román Castillo (Vida / Motagua)

- 13 goals:

(Honduras) Romell Quioto (Vida / Olimpia)

- 12 goals:

(Honduras) Luis Ramírez (Deportes Savio / Marathón)

- 11 goals:

(Honduras) Julio de León (Platense)
(Uruguay) Claudio Cardozo (Real España)

- 10 goals:

(Honduras) Luis Lobo (Parrillas One)

- 9 goals:

(Honduras) Elkin González (Real Sociedad)
(Colombia) Charles Córdoba (Parrillas One)
(Honduras) Óscar Fortín (Deportes Savio)
(Honduras) Diego Reyes (Real Sociedad / Marathón)
(Uruguay) Maximiliano Lombardi (Motagua)

- 8 goals:

(Honduras) Eddie Hernández (Vida)
(Honduras) Rony Flores (Marathón / Victoria)

- 7 goals:

(Uruguay) José Varela (Motagua)
(Brazil) Romário Pinto (Deportes Savio)
(Honduras) Carlos Discua (Motagua)
(Uruguay) Julio Rodríguez (Real España)
(Honduras) Mario Martínez (Real España)
(Honduras) Carlo Costly (Real España)

- 6 goals:

(Argentina) Kevin Hoyos (Victoria)
(Honduras) Gerson Rodas (Real España)
(Argentina) Leandro Guaita (Victoria)
(Honduras) Fredixon Elvir (Victoria)
(Honduras) Carlos Mejía (Olimpia)

- 5 goals:

(Honduras) Georgie Welcome (Motagua / Platense)
(Honduras) Cholby Martínez (Vida)
(Honduras) Henry Martínez (Real Sociedad)
(Honduras) Juan Munguía (Real Sociedad)
(Colombia) Omar Guerra (Olimpia)
(Honduras) Horacio Parham (Parrillas One)
(Honduras) Mario Berríos (Marathón)

- 4 goals:

(Honduras) Pastor Martínez (Deportes Savio)
(Honduras) Clayvin Zúniga (Deportes Savio)
(Honduras) Edder Delgado (Real España)
(Honduras) Ian Osorio (Marathón)
(Argentina) Pablo Vásquez (Olimpia)
(Honduras) Jerrick Díaz (Platense)
(Belize) Elroy Smith (Platense)
(Colombia) Jhovani Lasso (Deportes Savio)
(Honduras) César Zelaya (Real Sociedad)
(Honduras) Emil Martínez (Marathón)
(Honduras) José Tobías (Real Sociedad)

- 3 goals:

(Honduras) Jefferson Bernárdez (Parrillas One)
(Honduras) Henrry Clark (Real Sociedad)
(Costa Rica) Allan Alemán (Real España)
(Honduras) Juan Rodríguez (Parrillas One)
(Argentina) Leonardo Domínguez (Victoria)
(Honduras) Marco Vega (Marathón)
(Honduras) Ozzie Bodden (Victoria)
(Honduras) Osman Melgares (Real Sociedad)
(Honduras) Juan Mejía (Real España)
(Honduras) Bryan Castro (Vida)
(Honduras) Porciano Ávila (Parrillas One)
(Honduras) Luis Guzmán (Parrillas One)
(Honduras) Michael Montero (Vida)
(Honduras) Rubén Licona (Victoria)

- 2 goals:

(Uruguay) Jonathan Techera (Marathón)
(El Salvador) Léster Blanco (Real España)
(Honduras) Aly Arriola (Deportes Savio)
(Spain) Pablo Rodríguez (Marathón)
(Uruguay) Ramiro Bruschi (Olimpia)
(Honduras) Miguel Valerio (Vida)
(Honduras) Wilson Güity (Real Sociedad)
(Honduras) Franco Güity (Real España)
(Uruguay) Christian Alba (Vida)
(Honduras) Júnior Padilla (Motagua)
(Honduras) Jorge Cardona (Platense)
(Honduras) César Oseguera (Motagua)
(Honduras) Óscar Durón (Marathón)
(Honduras) Wilmer Crisanto (Victoria)
(Honduras) Johny Galdámez (Deportes Savio)
(Colombia) Eder Arias (Victoria)
(Honduras) Ángel Pineda (Deportes Savio)
(Honduras) Mauricio Sabillón (Marathón)
(Honduras) Mariano Acevedo (Olimpia)
(Honduras) Víctor Ortiz (Victoria)
(Honduras) Erick Norales (Vida)
(Honduras) Alfredo Mejía (Motagua / Marathón)
(Honduras) Misael Ruiz (Real Sociedad)
(Brazil) Ney Costa (Deportes Savio)
(Honduras) Mario Ventura (Parrillas One)
(Honduras) Arnol Solórzano (Parrillas One)
(Honduras) Randy Diamond (Platense)
(Honduras) Sergio Peña (Real Sociedad)

- 1 goal:

(Honduras) Nery Medina (Olimpia)
(Honduras) Rigoberto Padilla (Olimpia)
(Honduras) Brayan Figueroa (Motagua)
(Honduras) Henry Bermúdez (Olimpia)
(Honduras) Anael Figueroa (Parrillas One)
(Honduras) Irvin Reyna (Olimpia)
(Honduras) José Casildo (Platense)
(Honduras) Walter Martínez (Vida)
(Honduras) Denis Suazo (Victoria)
(Honduras) Irbin Guerrero (Platense)
(Honduras) Júnior Izaguirre (Motagua)
(Honduras) Mitchel Brown (Marathón)
(Honduras) Cristian Lara (Platense)
(Honduras) Kevin López (Motagua)
(Honduras) Bryan Acosta (Real España)
(Honduras) Omar Elvir (Motagua)
(Honduras) Francisco Benítez (Deportes Savio)
(Honduras) Melvin Valladares (Motagua)
(Honduras) Francisco López (Victoria)
(Colombia) Edder Arias (Victoria)
(Honduras) Carlos Valle (Vida)
(Honduras) Jonathan Posas (Parrillas One)
(Honduras) Reynaldo Tilguath (Olimpia)
(Honduras) Ronald García (Platense)
(Honduras) Wilmer Fuentes (Marathón)
(Honduras) Hilder Colón (Real España)
(Colombia) Samuel Córdova (Victoria)
(Honduras) Raúl Santos (Vida)
(Argentina) Eduardo Sosa (Motagua)
(Honduras) Bayron Méndez (Olimpia)
(Honduras) Kevin Espinoza (Marathón)
(Honduras) José Williams (Real Sociedad)
(Honduras) Héctor Flores (Parrillas One)
(Honduras) Bani Lozano (Platense)
(Honduras) Johnny Calderón (Vida)
(Honduras) Juan Montes (Motagua)
(Brazil) Douglas Caetano (Olimpia)
(Brazil) Marcelo Souza (Deportes Savio)
(Honduras) Efraín López (Victoria)
(Honduras) Selvin Castellanos (Parrillas One)
(Honduras) Reinieri Mayorquín (Motagua)
(Honduras) Christian Martínez (Vida)
(Honduras) Jaime Rosales (Platense)
(Honduras) Bryan Martínez (Victoria)
(Honduras) Luis Maldonado (Marathón)
(Honduras) Amado Guevara (Marathón)

- 1 own goal:

(Honduras) Rigoberto Padilla (Olimpia)
(Colombia) Javier Estupiñán (Platense)
(Honduras) Carlos Valle (Vida)
(Honduras) Ozzie Bodden (Victoria)
(Honduras) Dilmer Gutiérrez (Real Sociedad)
(Honduras) Selvin Tinoco (Deportes Savio)
(Colombia) Luis Castro (Motagua)

== Aggregate table ==
Relegation was determined by the aggregated table of both Apertura and Clausura tournaments. On 13 April 2014, Deportes Savio was relegated to Liga de Ascenso by finishing last with 37 points, 4 less than C.D. Marathón and C.D.S. Vida.

Pos	Team	Pld	W	D	L	GF	GA	GD	Pts	Qualification or relegation
1	Real Sociedad	36	17	10	9	61	42	+19	61	
2	Olimpia	36	17	9	10	60	42	+18	60	2014–15 CONCACAF Champions League
3	Real España	36	15	14	7	69	50	+19	59	2014–15 CONCACAF Champions League
4	Motagua	36	13	11	12	45	43	+2	50	
5	Victoria	36	12	11	13	42	46	−4	47	
6	Parrillas One	36	11	11	14	51	55	−4	44	
7	Platense	36	9	17	10	35	39	−4	44	
8	Vida	36	11	8	17	48	60	−12	41	
9	Marathón	36	10	11	15	42	55	−13	41	
10	Deportes Savio	36	9	10	17	39	60	−21	37	Relegation to the 2014–15 Liga de Ascenso

Updated to match(es) played on 13 April 2014. Source:
