= 2014–15 Honduran Liga Nacional =

Liga Nacional
- Season: 2014–15
- Champions: Apertura: Motagua; Clausura: Olimpia
- Relegated: Parrillas One
- Champions League: Motagua; Olimpia
- Matches: 200
- Goals: 573 (2.87 per match)
- Top goalscorer: Castillo (29)
- Biggest home win: Real España 5–0 Motagua (24 August 2014); Olimpia 5–0 Platense (7 September 2014); Motagua 5–0 Real España (19 October 2014); Real Sociedad 5–0 Victoria (2 November 2014); Olimpia 5–0 Real España (17 May 2015)
- Biggest away win: Motagua 1–4 Olimpia (31 August 2014)
- Highest scoring: Platense 4–4 Honduras Progreso (18 October 2014); Honduras Progreso 5–3 Real Sociedad (1 November 2014)
- Longest unbeaten run: Olimpia (15)
- Longest losing run: Platense (5)
- All statistics correct as of 24 May 2015.

The 2014–15 Honduran Liga Nacional season was the 49th Honduran Liga Nacional edition, since its establishment in 1965. For this season, the system format remained the same as the previous season. The tournament began on 1 August 2014 and has ended in May 2015. On 20 December 2014, C.D. Motagua obtained its 13th national title after defeating C.D. Real Sociedad 2–1 on aggregate in the Apertura finals.

== 2014–15 teams ==
Location of teams in 2014–15 season

A total of 10 teams will contest the tournament, including 9 sides from the 2013–14 season plus C.D. Honduras Progreso, promoted from the 2013–14 Liga de Ascenso. Parrillas One moved from Tela to Siguatepeque.

Team	Location	Stadium	Capacity
Honduras Progreso	El Progreso	Estadio Humberto Micheletti	5,000
Marathón	San Pedro Sula	Estadio Yankel Rosenthal	15,000
Motagua	Tegucigalpa	Estadio Tiburcio Carías Andino	35,000
Olimpia	Tegucigalpa	Estadio Tiburcio Carías Andino	35,000
Parrillas One	Siguatepeque	Estadio Roberto Martínez Ávila	3,000
Platense	Puerto Cortés	Estadio Excélsior	7,910
Real España	San Pedro Sula	Estadio Francisco Morazán	26,781
Real Sociedad	Tocoa	Estadio Francisco Martínez Durón	3,000
Victoria	La Ceiba	Estadio Nilmo Edwards	18,000
Vida	La Ceiba	Estadio Nilmo Edwards	18,000

== Apertura ==
=== Regular season ===
Real C.D. España managed to clinch the first position after drawing 1–1 at C.D. Victoria on the last round. It was the 9th time in history that the Aurinegros came up as the regular season winners. One curious fact occurred between C.D. Motagua and Real España where they both achieve a 5–0 home win over each other, breaking their respective record as the largest victory against each other. C.D. Victoria finished last for the fifth time in history.

==== Standings ====
Pos	Team	Pld	W	D	L	GF	GA	GD	Pts	Qualification or relegation
1	Real España	18	8	5	5	30	28	+2	29	Qualification to the Semifinals
2	Olimpia	18	8	4	6	36	22	+14	28	Qualification to the Semifinals
3	Motagua	18	8	4	6	30	25	+5	28	Qualification to the Second round
4	Honduras Progreso	18	7	7	4	34	31	+3	28	Qualification to the Second round
5	Real Sociedad	18	7	6	5	25	18	+7	27	Qualification to the Second round
6	Platense	18	6	6	6	27	27	0	24	Qualification to the Second round
7	Marathón	18	5	7	6	20	25	−5	22	
8	Vida	18	5	6	7	26	30	−4	21	
9	Parrillas One	18	4	6	8	28	38	−10	18	
10	Victoria	18	3	7	8	22	34	−12	16	

Updated to match(es) played on 15 November 2014. Source:

==== Results ====
As of 15 November 2014

Home \ Away	HON	MAR	MOT	OLI	PAR	PLA	RES	RSO	VIC	VID
Honduras Progreso		1–1	1–1	2–2	5–3	1–1	2–2	1–0	3–2	3–3
Marathón	1–2		3–1	2–2	2–1	1–0	2–3	1–1	0–1	1–1
Motagua	4–1	0–1		1–4	1–1	2–0	5–0	4–1	2–1	1–2
Olimpia	0–2	4–0	0–1		3–0	5–0	2–1	0–2	3–0	3–1
Parrillas One	1–3	1–1	2–2	1–1		0–2	3–2	2–2	3–3	2–1
Platense	4–4	0–0	2–1	1–0	4–1		3–3	1–2	3–2	4–1
Real España	1–0	0–2	5–0	2–1	3–2	2–1		0–0	3–2	1–2
Real Sociedad	2–1	3–0	1–1	2–0	1–2	1–0	0–1		5–0	0–2
Victoria	1–2	1–1	0–2	2–2	1–0	0–0	1–1	1–1		2–2
Vida	2–0	3–1	0–1	2–4	1–3	1–1	0–0	1–1	1–2	

Source: Soccerway
Legend: Blue = home team win; Yellow = draw; Red = away team win.
- Real Sociedad 3–0 Marathón on forfeit. Original score 1–1 abandoned at 88' due to Marathón not accepting a late penalty.

=== Postseason ===
==== Playoffs ====
3rd seeded	Agg.	6th seeded	1st leg	2nd leg
Motagua	4–2	Platense	2–1	2–1
4th seeded	Agg.	5th seeded	1st leg	2nd leg
Honduras Progreso	4–4	Real Sociedad	0–1	4–3

Match details
20 November 2014
19:00 (UTC−06:00)
1st leg

Platense	1–2	Motagua
Aguilar 13'	Report	25' Figueroa; 45' Gómez

Estadio Excélsior
Puerto Cortés, Cortés
Attendance: 1,406
Referee: Orlando Hernández

Platense	Motagua

GK	24	(Honduras) José Pineda
DF	5	(Honduras) Hendry Córdova
DF	6	(Honduras) Luis Palacios	(substituted off) 51'
DF	8	(Belize) Elroy Smith
DF	21	(Honduras) Odis Borjas
DF	30	(Honduras) Ian Osorio
MF	10	(Honduras) Julio de León
MF	16	(Honduras) Jorge Cardona	(substituted off) 65'
MF	22	(Honduras) Alexander Aguilar
MF	25	(Honduras) David Mendoza
FW	15	(Colombia) Mario Abadía	(substituted off) 46'
Substitutions:
FW	27	(Honduras) Jerrick Díaz	(substituted on) 46'
FW	19	(Honduras) José Casildo	(substituted on) 51'
–	–	(Honduras) Cristian Altamirano	(substituted on) 65'
Manager:
(Honduras) Carlos Martínez

GK	25	(Honduras) Marlon Licona
DF	2	(Honduras) Juan Montes
DF	3	(Honduras) Henry Figueroa
DF	4	(Honduras) Júnior Izaguirre
DF	5	(Honduras) Marcelo Pereira
DF	18	(Honduras) Wilmer Crisanto	(substituted off) 68'
DF	19	(Honduras) César Oseguera
DF	24	(Honduras) Omar Elvir
MF	7	(Honduras) Carlos Discua	(substituted off) 80'
FW	9	(Honduras) Román Castillo
FW	11	(Argentina) Lucas Gómez	(substituted off) 61'
Substitutions:
DF	8	(Honduras) Orlin Peralta	(substituted on) 61'
DF	26	(Honduras) José García	(substituted on) 68'
DF	49	(Honduras) Joshua Nieto	(substituted on) 80'
Manager:
(Argentina) Diego Vásquez

23 November 2014
16:00 (UTC−06:00)
2nd leg

Motagua	2–1	Platense
Castillo 74' 90+2'	Report	33' de León

Estadio Tiburcio Carías Andino
Tegucigalpa, Francisco Morazán
Referee: Orlando Hernández

Motagua	Platense

GK	25	(Honduras) Marlon Licona
DF	2	(Honduras) Juan Montes
DF	3	(Honduras) Henry Figueroa
DF	4	(Honduras) Júnior Izaguirre
DF	18	(Honduras) Wilmer Crisanto	(substituted off) 81'
DF	19	(Honduras) César Oseguera
DF	24	(Honduras) Omar Elvir
MF	6	(Honduras) Marvin Barrios	(substituted off) 60'
MF	14	(Honduras) Irvin Reyna
FW	9	(Honduras) Román Castillo
FW	11	(Argentina) Lucas Gómez	(substituted off) 87'
Substitutions:
MF	12	(Honduras) Reinieri Mayorquín	(substituted on) 60'
DF	26	(Honduras) José García	(substituted on) 81'
MF	22	(Honduras) Ramón Amador	(substituted on) 87'
Manager:
(Argentina) Diego Vásquez

GK	24	(Honduras) José Pineda
DF	5	(Honduras) Hendry Córdova
DF	6	(Honduras) Luis Palacios
DF	8	(Belize) Elroy Smith
DF	21	(Honduras) Odis Borjas
DF	30	(Honduras) Ian Osorio
MF	10	(Honduras) Julio de León	(substituted off) 70'
MF	14	(Honduras) Ronmel Corea
MF	16	(Honduras) Jorge Cardona	(substituted off) 77'
MF	–	(Honduras) Walter Hernández
FW	15	(Colombia) Mario Abadía
Substitutions:
FW	19	(Honduras) José Casildo	(substituted on) 70'
MF	22	(Honduras) Alexander Aguilar	(substituted on) 77'
–	–	–
Manager:
(Honduras) Carlos Martínez

19 November 2014
15:00 (UTC−06:00)
1st leg

Real Sociedad	1–0	Honduras Progreso
González 55' (pen.)	Report

Estadio Francisco Martínez Durón
Tocoa, Colón
Attendance: 1,160
Referee: Melvin Matamoros

Real Sociedad	Honduras

GK	1	(Honduras) Sandro Cárcamo
DF	3	(Honduras) Robbie Matute
DF	4	(Honduras) Dilmer Gutiérrez
DF	6	(Honduras) José Barralaga
DF	17	(Honduras) Osman Melgares
DF	18	(Honduras) Henry Clark
MF	10	(Honduras) César Zelaya	Substituted off
MF	20	(Honduras) Elkin González	Substituted off
MF	31	(Honduras) Pablo Arzú	Substituted off
FW	11	(Honduras) Rony Martínez
FW	16	(Honduras) Rubén Licona
Substitutions:
DF	19	(Honduras) José Tobías	Substituted on
FW	8	(Honduras) Juan Munguía	Substituted on
MF	15	(Honduras) Enuar Salgado	Substituted on
Manager:
(Colombia) Horacio Londoño

GK	29	(Honduras) Kelvin Castillo
DF	1	(Honduras) Pastor Martínez
DF	3	(Honduras) Jorge Zaldívar
DF	4	(Honduras) Dederick Cálix
DF	31	(Honduras) Carlos Sánchez
MF	5	(Honduras) Juan Ocampo
MF	6	(Honduras) Juan Delgado
MF	8	(Honduras) Jorge Cardona
MF	20	(Honduras) Leonardo Isaula	Substituted off
FW	10	(Honduras) Edwin León	Substituted off
FW	13	(Honduras) Ángel Tejeda
Substitutions:
MF	23	(Honduras) Francisco Benítez	Substituted on	Substituted off
FW	14	(Honduras) Héctor Flores	Substituted on
DF	17	(Honduras) Luis Guzmán	Substituted on
Manager:
(Honduras) Wilmer Cruz

22 November 2014
19:00 (UTC−06:00)
2nd leg

Honduras Progreso	4–3	Real Sociedad
Cardona 23'; Guzmán 69'; Isaula 83'; Tejeda 90+3'	Report	29' Melgares; 53' Arzú; 72' (pen.) Clark

Estadio Humberto Micheletti
El Progreso, Yoro
Referee: Erick Andino

Honduras	Real Sociedad

GK	27	(Honduras) Orlin Vallecillo
DF	3	(Honduras) Jorge Zaldívar
DF	4	(Honduras) Dederick Cálix
DF	31	(Honduras) Carlos Sánchez	(substituted off) 43'
MF	5	(Honduras) Juan Ocampo
MF	6	(Honduras) Juan Delgado	(substituted off) 59'
MF	8	(Honduras) Jorge Cardona
MF	15	(Honduras) Franklyn Morales
MF	20	(Honduras) Leonardo Isaula
FW	10	(Honduras) Edwin León	(substituted off) 46'
FW	13	(Honduras) Ángel Tejeda
Substitutions:
DF	17	(Honduras) Luis Guzmán	(substituted on) 43'
FW	14	(Honduras) Héctor Flores	(substituted on) 46'
FW	19	(Honduras) Aly Arriola	(substituted on) 59'
Manager:
(Honduras) Wilmer Cruz

GK	1	(Honduras) Sandro Cárcamo
DF	3	(Honduras) Robbie Matute
DF	4	(Honduras) Dilmer Gutiérrez
DF	6	(Honduras) José Barralaga
DF	17	(Honduras) Osman Melgares
DF	18	(Honduras) Henry Clark
DF	19	(Honduras) José Tobías	(substituted off) 75'
MF	15	(Honduras) Enuar Salgado
MF	31	(Honduras) Pablo Arzú	(substituted off) 60'
FW	11	(Honduras) Rony Martínez
FW	16	(Honduras) Rubén Licona	(substituted off) 67'
Substitutions:
FW	8	(Honduras) Juan Munguía	(substituted on) 60'
MF	12	(Honduras) Yossimar Orellana	(substituted on) 67'
MF	10	(Honduras) César Zelaya	(substituted on) 75'
Manager:
(Colombia) Horacio Londoño

==== Semifinals ====
1st seeded	Agg.	4th seeded	1st leg	2nd leg
Real España	1–2	Real Sociedad	0–2	1–0
2nd seeded	Agg.	3rd seeded	1st leg	2nd leg
Olimpia	1–2	Motagua	0–1	1–1

Match details
30 November 2014
15:00 (UTC−06:00)
1st leg

Real Sociedad	2–0	Real España
Tobías 60'; Martínez 74'	Report

Estadio Francisco Martínez Durón
Tocoa, Colón
Attendance: 791

Real Sociedad	Real España

GK	1	(Honduras) Sandro Cárcamo
DF	3	(Honduras) Robbie Matute
DF	4	(Honduras) Dilmer Gutiérrez
DF	6	(Honduras) José Barralaga
DF	17	(Honduras) Osman Melgares
DF	18	(Honduras) Henry Clark
DF	19	(Honduras) José Tobías
MF	20	(Honduras) Elkin González	(substituted off) 89'
MF	31	(Honduras) Pablo Arzú
FW	11	(Honduras) Rony Martínez
FW	16	(Honduras) Rubén Licona
Substitutions:
MF	15	(Honduras) Enuar Salgado	(substituted on) 89'
–	–	–
–	–	–
Manager:
(Colombia) Horacio Londoño

GK	22	(Honduras) Luis López
DF	4	(Honduras) Porciano Ávila
DF	19	(Honduras) Sergio Mendoza
DF	30	(Honduras) Jeffri Flores
DF	33	(Honduras) Hárlinton Gutiérrez
MF	6	(Honduras) Bryan Acosta
MF	16	(Honduras) Kevin Espinoza
MF	23	(Honduras) Edder Delgado
FW	9	(Uruguay) Claudio Cardozo	(substituted off) 67'
FW	20	(Honduras) Rony Flores
FW	21	(Colombia) Juan Aguirre	(substituted off) 77'
Substitutions:
FW	17	(Honduras) Juan Mejía	(substituted on) 67'
FW	7	(Honduras) Luis Lobo	(substituted on) 77'
–	–	–
Manager:
(Costa Rica) Javier Delgado

6 December 2014
19:00 (UTC−06:00)
2nd leg

Real España	1–0	Real Sociedad
Gutiérrez 34'	Report

Estadio Francisco Morazán
San Pedro Sula, Cortés
Referee: Óscar Moncada

Real España	Real Sociedad

GK	22	(Honduras) Luis López
DF	5	(Honduras) Wilfredo Barahona	(substituted off) 82'
DF	19	(Honduras) Sergio Mendoza	(yellow card) 40'
DF	30	(Honduras) Jeffri Flores	(yellow card) 56'
DF	33	(Honduras) Hárlinton Gutiérrez
MF	6	(Honduras) Bryan Acosta
MF	8	(Uruguay) Julio Rodríguez	(substituted off) 77'
MF	23	(Honduras) Edder Delgado
FW	9	(Uruguay) Claudio Cardozo
FW	21	(Colombia) Juan Aguirre	(substituted off) 71'
FW	35	(Honduras) Bryan Róchez
Substitutions:
FW	20	(Honduras) Rony Flores	(substituted on) 71'
FW	11	(Argentina) Ismael Gómez	(substituted on) 77'
FW	17	(Honduras) Juan Mejía	(substituted on) 82'
Manager:
(Costa Rica) Javier Delgado

GK	1	(Honduras) Sandro Cárcamo
DF	3	(Honduras) Robbie Matute	(yellow card) 33'
DF	4	(Honduras) Dilmer Gutiérrez
DF	6	(Honduras) José Barralaga
DF	17	(Honduras) Osman Melgares	(yellow card) 55'
DF	18	(Honduras) Henry Clark
DF	19	(Honduras) José Tobías
MF	30	(Honduras) Elkin González	(substituted off) 86'
MF	31	(Honduras) Pablo Arzú	(substituted off) 64'
FW	11	(Honduras) Rony Martínez
FW	16	(Honduras) Rubén Licona
Substitutions:
FW	7	(Honduras) Henry Martínez	(substituted on) 64'
MF	15	(Honduras) Enuar Salgado	(substituted on) 86'
–	–	–
Manager:
(Colombia) Horacio Londoño

30 November 2014
16:00 (UTC−06:00)
1st leg

Motagua	1–0	Olimpia
Discua 21'	Report

Estadio Tiburcio Carías Andino
Tegucigalpa, Francisco Morazán
Attendance: 11,864

Motagua	Olimpia

GK	25	(Honduras) Marlon Licona
DF	2	(Honduras) Juan Montes
DF	3	(Honduras) Henry Figueroa
DF	4	(Honduras) Júnior Izaguirre
DF	18	(Honduras) Wilmer Crisanto
DF	24	(Honduras) Omar Elvir	(substituted off) 85'
MF	7	(Honduras) Carlos Discua	(substituted off) 62'
MF	12	(Honduras) Reinieri Mayorquín	(substituted off) 57'
FW	9	(Honduras) Román Castillo
FW	11	(Argentina) Lucas Gómez
FW	14	(Honduras) Irvin Reyna
Substitutions:
MF	23	(Honduras) Deybi Flores	(substituted on) 57'
DF	19	(Honduras) César Oseguera	(substituted on) 62'
MF	8	(Honduras) Orlin Peralta	(substituted on) 85'
Manager:
(Honduras) Ninrrol Medina (Diego Vásquez suspended)

GK	28	(Honduras) Donis Escober
DF	4	(Brazil) Fábio de Souza
DF	12	(Honduras) Bryan Johnson
DF	22	(Honduras) Nery Medina
DF	25	(Honduras) Javier Portillo
MF	7	(Honduras) Carlos Mejía	(substituted off) 79'
MF	10	(Colombia) Omar Guerra
MF	20	(Honduras) Oliver Morazán
MF	29	(Honduras) German Mejía	(substituted off) 38'
FW	9	(Honduras) Anthony Lozano
FW	31	(Honduras) Romell Quioto
Substitutions:
MF	16	(Honduras) Bayron Méndez	(substituted on) 38'
FW	18	(Honduras) Franco Güity	(substituted on) 79'
–	–	–
Manager:
(Argentina) Héctor Vargas

7 December 2014
16:00 (UTC−06:00)
2nd leg

Olimpia	1–1	Motagua
Quioto 38'	Report	62' Discua

Estadio Tiburcio Carías Andino
Tegucigalpa, Francisco Morazán
Referee: Armando Castro

Olimpia	Motagua

GK	27	(Honduras) Noel Valladares
DF	4	(Brazil) Fábio de Souza
DF	5	(Honduras) Ever Álvarez
DF	12	(Honduras) Bryan Johnson
DF	25	(Honduras) Javier Portillo	(substituted off) 31'
MF	10	(Colombia) Omar Guerra
MF	16	(Honduras) Bayron Méndez
MF	20	(Honduras) Óliver Morazán
MF	24	(Honduras) Mariano Acevedo	(substituted off) 56'
FW	9	(Honduras) Anthony Lozano
FW	31	(Honduras) Romell Quioto
Substitutions:
DF	5	(Honduras) Ever Alvarado	(substituted on) 31'
DF	14	(Honduras) José Fonseca	(substituted on) 56'
–	–	–
Manager:
(Argentina) Héctor Vargas

GK	25	(Honduras) Marlon Licona
DF	2	(Honduras) Juan Montes
DF	3	(Honduras) Henry Figueroa
DF	4	(Honduras) Júnior Izaguirre
DF	18	(Honduras) Wilmer Crisanto	(substituted off) 82'
DF	24	(Honduras) Omar Elvir	(substituted off) 77'
MF	7	(Honduras) Carlos Discua
MF	23	(Honduras) Deybi Flores
FW	9	(Honduras) Román Castillo
FW	11	(Argentina) Lucas Gómez	(substituted off) 87'
FW	14	(Honduras) Irvin Reyna
Substitutions:
DF	19	(Honduras) César Oseguera	(substituted on) 77'
MF	6	(Honduras) Marvin Barrios	(substituted on) 82'
FW	34	(Honduras) Kevin López	(substituted on) 87'
Manager:
(Argentina) Diego Vásquez

==== Final ====
1st seeded	Agg.	2nd seeded	1st leg	2nd leg
Motagua	2–1	Real Sociedad	0–0	2–1

Match details
14 December 2014
14:00 (UTC−06:00)
1st leg

Real Sociedad	0–0	Motagua
	Report

Estadio Francisco Martínez Durón
Tocoa, Colón
Referee: Óscar Moncada

Real Sociedad	Motagua

GK	1	(Honduras) Sandro Cárcamo
DF	3	(Honduras) Robbie Matute
DF	4	(Honduras) Dilmer Gutiérrez
DF	6	(Honduras) José Barralaga
DF	17	(Honduras) Osman Melgares
DF	18	(Honduras) Henry Clark
DF	19	(Honduras) José Tobías
MF	20	(Honduras) Elkin González	(substituted off) 70'
MF	31	(Honduras) Pablo Arzú
FW	11	(Honduras) Rony Martínez	(substituted off) 13'
FW	16	(Honduras) Rubén Licona
Substitutions:
FW	7	(Honduras) Henry Martínez	(substituted on) 13'
MF	10	(Honduras) César Zelaya	(substituted on) 70'
–	–	–
Manager:
(Colombia) Horacio Londoño

GK	25	(Honduras) Marlon Licona
DF	2	(Honduras) Juan Montes
DF	3	(Honduras) Henry Figueroa
DF	4	(Honduras) Júnior Izaguirre
DF	18	(Honduras) Wilmer Crisanto	(substituted off) 64'
DF	24	(Honduras) Omar Elvir	(substituted off) 53'
MF	7	(Honduras) Carlos Discua	(substituted off) 88'
MF	23	(Honduras) Deybi Flores
FW	9	(Honduras) Román Castillo
FW	11	(Argentina) Lucas Gómez
FW	14	(Honduras) Irvin Reyna
Substitutions:
DF	19	(Honduras) César Oseguera	(substituted on) 53'
MF	6	(Honduras) Marvin Barrios	(substituted on) 64'
FW	34	(Honduras) Kevin López	(substituted on) 88'
Manager:
(Argentina) Diego Vásquez

20 December 2014
19:00 (UTC−06:00)
2nd leg

Motagua	2–1	Real Sociedad
Discua 19'; Castillo 44'	Report	36' Munguía

Estadio Tiburcio Carías Andino
Tegucigalpa, Francisco Morazán
Attendance: 34,169
Referee: Armando Castro

Motagua	Real Sociedad

GK	25	(Honduras) Marlon Licona
DF	2	(Honduras) Juan Montes
DF	3	(Honduras) Henry Figueroa
DF	4	(Honduras) Júnior Izaguirre
DF	18	(Honduras) Wilmer Crisanto	(substituted off) 89'
DF	24	(Honduras) Omar Elvir	(substituted off) 63'
MF	7	(Honduras) Carlos Discua	(substituted off) 76'
MF	23	(Honduras) Deybi Flores
FW	9	(Honduras) Román Castillo
FW	11	(Argentina) Lucas Gómez
FW	14	(Honduras) Irvin Reyna
Substitutions:
DF	19	(Honduras) César Oseguera	(substituted on) 63'
FW	34	(Honduras) Kevin López	(substituted on) 76'
MF	6	(Honduras) Marvin Barrios	(substituted on) 89'
Manager:
(Argentina) Diego Vásquez

GK	1	(Honduras) Sandro Cárcamo
DF	3	(Honduras) Robbie Matute
DF	4	(Honduras) Dilmer Gutiérrez
DF	6	(Honduras) José Barralaga
DF	17	(Honduras) Osman Melgares
DF	18	(Honduras) Henry Clark
DF	19	(Honduras) José Tobías
MF	20	(Honduras) Elkin González	(substituted off) 59'
FW	7	(Honduras) Henry Martínez	(substituted off) 74'
FW	8	(Honduras) Juan Munguía	(substituted off) 54'
FW	16	(Honduras) Rubén Licona
Substitutions:
MF	31	(Honduras) Pablo Arzú	(substituted on) 54'
MF	22	(Honduras) Clayvin Zúniga	(substituted on) 59'
MF	10	(Honduras) César Zelaya	(substituted on) 74'
Manager:
(Colombia) Horacio Londoño

== Clausura ==
=== Regular season ===
==== Standings ====
Pos	Team	Pld	W	D	L	GF	GA	GD	Pts	Qualification or relegation
1	Olimpia	18	11	6	1	35	16	+19	39	Qualification to the Semifinals
2	Motagua	18	11	4	3	37	21	+16	37	Qualification to the Semifinals
3	Marathón	18	8	5	5	20	23	−3	29	Qualification to the Second round
4	Victoria	18	6	7	5	26	22	+4	25	Qualification to the Second round
5	Real Sociedad	18	4	10	4	14	16	−2	22	Qualification to the Second round
6	Real España	18	4	9	5	28	25	+3	21	Qualification to the Second round
7	Vida	18	4	6	8	24	31	−7	18	
8	Honduras Progreso	18	5	3	10	26	35	−9	18	
9	Parrillas One	18	4	4	10	25	35	−10	16	
10	Platense	18	3	6	9	23	34	−11	15	

Updated to match(es) played on 2 May 2015. Source:

==== Results ====
As of 2 May 2015

Home \ Away	HON	MAR	MOT	OLI	PAR	PLA	RES	RSO	VIC	VID
Honduras Progreso		3–1	0–1	1–2	1–1	2–1	1–3	0–0	0–2	3–2
Marathón	0–3		0–2	3–2	2–1	1–1	1–0	0–0	2–1	2–0
Motagua	3–1	3–0		1–1	3–4	2–0	2–2	3–2	3–0	2–1
Olimpia	2–1	2–0	3–1		3–1	2–0	1–0	2–0	1–1	4–1
Parrillas One	3–1	1–1	1–2	0–2		1–2	0–3	2–2	2–1	1–3
Platense	3–3	2–3	2–2	0–2	2–1		2–2	0–1	1–0	2–2
Real España	2–4	1–1	1–2	1–1	3–1	3–1		1–1	2–2	0–1
Real Sociedad	3–0	0–0	1–0	1–1	0–2	1–1	1–1		0–3	1–0
Victoria	3–1	1–2	2–2	1–1	3–2	2–1	1–1	0–0		2–0
Vida	3–1	0–1	0–3	3–3	1–1	4–2	2–2	0–0	1–1	

Source: Soccerway
Legend: Blue = home team win; Yellow = draw; Red = away team win.

=== Postseason ===
==== Playoffs ====
3rd seeded	Agg.	6th seeded	1st leg	2nd leg
Marathón	3–4	Real España	1–4	2–0
4th seeded	Agg.	5th seeded	1st leg	2nd leg
Victoria	2–0	Real Sociedad	1–0	1–0

Match details
6 May 2015
19:00 (UTC−06:00)
1st leg

Real España	4–1	Marathón
Sabillón 11' (o.g.); Cardozo 15'; V. Núñez 41'; R. Núñez 81'	Report	90+2' Reyes

Estadio Francisco Morazán
San Pedro Sula, Cortés
Referee: Armando Castro

Real España	Marathón

GK	22	(Honduras) Luis López
DF	2	(Honduras) Marlon Peña
DF	5	(Honduras) Wilfredo Barahona
DF	19	(Honduras) Sergio Mendoza
DF	–	(Honduras) Erick Peña
MF	8	(Uruguay) Julio Rodríguez
MF	10	(Honduras) Mario Martínez	(substituted off) 72'
MF	13	(Honduras) Aldo Oviedo	(yellow card) 65'	(substituted off) 79'
MF	23	(Honduras) Edder Delgado
FW	9	(Uruguay) Claudio Cardozo	(yellow card) 56'	(substituted off) 73'
FW	27	(Costa Rica) Víctor Núñez	(yellow card) 35'
Substitutions:
MF	6	(Honduras) Bryan Acosta	(substituted on) 72'
FW	17	(Honduras) Juan Mejía	(substituted on) 73'
MF	11	(Honduras) Ramón Núñez	(substituted on) 79'
Manager:
(Costa Rica) Hernán Medford

GK	1	(Honduras) Yul Arzú
DF	5	(Honduras) Carlos Palacios
DF	12	(Honduras) Johnny Leverón	(yellow card) 43'
DF	19	(Honduras) Mario Berríos
DF	21	(Honduras) Daniel Tejeda
DF	23	(Honduras) Mauricio Sabillón
MF	6	(Honduras) Jairo Puerto
MF	17	(Honduras) Wilmer Fuentes	(substituted off) 84'
MF	30	(Honduras) Melvin Valladares	(substituted off) 63'
FW	8	(Honduras) Walter Martínez
FW	9	(Colombia) Charles Córdoba	(substituted off) 77'
Substitutions:
MF	–	(Honduras) Josep Cunningham	(substituted on) 63'	(yellow card) 78'
FW	11	(Honduras) Diego Reyes	(substituted on) 77'
MF	20	(Brazil) Romario Pinto	(substituted on) 84'
Manager:
(Colombia) Jairo Ríos

9 May 2015
15:30 (UTC−06:00)
2nd leg

Marathón	2–0	Real España
Berríos 42'; Leverón 49'	Report

Estadio Yankel Rosenthal
San Pedro Sula, Cortés
Referee: Melvin Matamoros

Marathón	Real España

GK	25	(Honduras) Denovan Torres
DF	5	(Honduras) Carlos Palacios
DF	12	(Honduras) Johnny Leverón
DF	19	(Honduras) Mario Berríos
DF	21	(Honduras) Daniel Tejeda
DF	23	(Honduras) Mauricio Sabillón
MF	6	(Honduras) Jairo Puerto
MF	17	(Honduras) Wilmer Fuentes
MF	20	(Brazil) Romario Pinto	(substituted off) 61'
FW	8	(Honduras) Walter Martínez
FW	9	(Colombia) Charles Córdoba
Substitutions:
MF	–	(Honduras) Josep Cunningham	(substituted on) 61'
–	–
–	–
Manager:
(Colombia) Jairo Ríos

GK	22	(Honduras) Luis López
DF	2	(Honduras) Marlon Peña
DF	5	(Honduras) Wilfredo Barahona
DF	19	(Honduras) Sergio Mendoza
DF	–	(Honduras) Erick Peña
MF	6	(Honduras) Bryan Acosta
MF	10	(Honduras) Mario Martínez	(substituted off) 45'
MF	13	(Honduras) Aldo Oviedo	(substituted off) 66'
MF	23	(Honduras) Edder Delgado
FW	17	(Honduras) Juan Mejía
FW	27	(Costa Rica) Víctor Núñez
Substitutions:
MF	8	(Uruguay) Julio Rodríguez	(substituted on) 45'
MF	12	(Honduras) Gerson Rodas	(substituted on) 66'
–	–
Manager:
(Costa Rica) Hernán Medford

7 May 2015
15:30 (UTC−06:00)
1st leg

Real Sociedad	0–1	Victoria
	Report	61' Medina

Estadio Francisco Martínez Durón
Tocoa, Colón
Referee: Manuel Zelaya

Real Sociedad	Victoria

GK	1	(Honduras) Donaldo Morales
DF	4	(Honduras) Dilmer Gutiérrez
DF	6	(Honduras) José Barralaga	(yellow card) 45'
DF	14	(Honduras) Carlos Solórzano
DF	18	(Honduras) Henry Clark
DF	19	(Honduras) José Tobías	(substituted off) 55'
MF	10	(Honduras) César Zelaya	(substituted off) 62'
MF	12	(Honduras) Ábner Méndez	(substituted off) 70'
MF	20	(Honduras) Elkin González
MF	25	(Honduras) Melvin Jiménez
FW	16	(Honduras) Rubén Licona
Substitutions:
FW	9	(Honduras) Ozzie Bodden	(substituted on) 55'
FW	8	(Honduras) Juan Munguía	(substituted on) 62'
FW	7	(Honduras) Henry Martínez	(substituted on) 70'
Manager:
(Colombia) Horacio Londoño

GK	23	(Honduras) John Bodden
DF	3	(Argentina) Leonardo Domínguez	(yellow card) 34'	(red card) 81'
DF	13	(Honduras) Nery Medina
DF	14	(Honduras) Misael Ruiz
DF	27	(Honduras) Félix Crisanto	(yellow card) 68'
MF	8	(Honduras) Miguel Castillo	(yellow card) 65'
MF	16	(Honduras) Héctor Castellanos	(yellow card) 43'
MF	19	(Argentina) Leandro Casale	(yellow card) 38'	(substituted off) 78'
MF	30	(Honduras) José Williams
FW	10	(Honduras) Erick Andino	(yellow card) 56'	(substituted off) 82'
FW	29	(Honduras) Franco Güity	(substituted off) 90+3'
Substitutions:
MF	2	(Honduras) Wilson Güity	(substituted on) 78'
DF	5	(Honduras) Henry Bermúdez	(substituted on) 82'
MF	12	(Argentina) Lucas Espíndola	(substituted on) 90+3'
Manager:
(Honduras) Jorge Pineda

9 May 2015
19:00 (UTC−06:00)
2nd leg

Victoria	1–0	Real Sociedad
Andino 37'	Report

Estadio Nilmo Edwards
La Ceiba, Atlántida
Referee: Óscar Moncada

Victoria	Real Sociedad

GK	23	(Honduras) John Bodden
DF	5	(Honduras) Henry Bermúdez
DF	13	(Honduras) Nery Medina
DF	14	(Honduras) Misael Ruiz
DF	27	(Honduras) Félix Crisanto
MF	8	(Honduras) Miguel Castillo	(substituted off) 89'
MF	16	(Honduras) Héctor Castellanos
MF	19	(Argentina) Leandro Casale	(substituted off) 68'
MF	30	(Honduras) José Williams
FW	10	(Honduras) Erick Andino
FW	29	(Honduras) Franco Güity
Substitutions:
MF	2	(Honduras) Wilson Güity	(substituted on) 68'
MF	7	(Honduras) Rigoberto Padilla	(substituted on) 89'
–	–
Manager:
(Honduras) Jorge Pineda

GK	1	(Honduras) Donaldo Morales
DF	4	(Honduras) Dilmer Guitiérrez
DF	6	(Honduras) José Barralaga
DF	14	(Honduras) Carlos Solórzano
DF	18	(Honduras) Henry Clark
DF	19	(Honduras) José Tobías
MF	12	(Honduras) Ábner Méndez
MF	25	(Honduras) Melvin Jiménez
FW	8	(Honduras) Juan Munguía
FW	9	(Honduras) Ozzie Bodden
FW	16	(Honduras) Rubén Licona
Substitutions:
–	–
–	–
–	–
Manager:
(Colombia) Horacio Londoño

==== Semifinals ====
1st seeded	Agg.	4th seeded	1st leg	2nd leg
Olimpia	6–0	Real España	1–0	5–0
2nd seeded	Agg.	3rd seeded	1st leg	2nd leg
Motagua	3–1	Victoria	0–1	3–0

Match details
13 May 2015
19:00 (UTC−06:00)
1st leg

Real España	0–1	Olimpia
	Report	24' Lozano

Estadio Francisco Morazán
San Pedro Sula, Cortés

Real España	Olimpia

GK	–	(Honduras) Luis López
–	–	(Honduras) Wilfredo Barahona
–	–	(Honduras) Erick Peña
–	–	(Honduras) Sergio Mendoza
–	–	(Honduras) Bryan Acosta
–	–	(Honduras) Mario Martínez	(substituted off) 74'
–	–	(Honduras) Edder Delgado
–	–	(Uruguay) Julio Rodríguez	(substituted off) 64'
–	–	(Honduras) Aldo Oviedo
FW	–	(Costa Rica) Víctor Núñez	(substituted off) 56'
FW	–	(Uruguay) Claudio Cardozo
Substitutions:
–	–	(Uruguay) Ramiro Bruschi	(substituted on) 56'
–	–	(Honduras) Ramón Núñez	(substituted on) 64'
–	–	(Honduras) Gerson Rodas	(substituted on) 74'
Manager:
(Costa Rica) Hernán Medford

GK	–	(Honduras) Noel Valladares
–	–	(Honduras) Edgar Flores
–	–	(Honduras) Johnny Palacios
–	–	(Brazil) Fábio de Souza
–	–	(Honduras) Ever Alvarado
–	–	(Honduras) Bayron Méndez	(substituted off) 78'
–	–	(Honduras) Óliver Morazán
–	–	Óscar Salas	(substituted off) 41'
–	–	(Honduras) Carlos Mejía
FW	–	(Honduras) Romell Quioto
FW	–	(Honduras) Anthony Lozano	(substituted off) 60'
Substitutions:
–	–	(Honduras) Bryan Johnson	(substituted on) 41'
–	–	(Colombia) Javier Estupiñán	(substituted on) 60'
MF	–	(Uruguay) Mario Leguizamón	(substituted on) 78'
Manager:
(Argentina) Héctor Vargas

17 May 2015
16:00 (UTC−06:00)
2nd leg

Olimpia	5–0	Real España
Lozano 17' 32'; Quioto 21'; Leguizamón 66'; Estupiñán 89'	Report

Estadio Tiburcio Carías Andino
Tegucigalpa, Francisco Morazán
Referee: Armando Castro

Olimpia	Real España

GK	–
–	–
–	–
–	–
–	–
–	–
–	–
–	–
–	–
–	–
–	–
Substitutions:
–	–
–	–
–	–
Manager:
(Argentina) Héctor Vargas

GK	–
–	–
–	–
–	–
–	–
–	–
–	–
–	–
–	–
–	–
–	–
Substitutions:
–	–
–	–
–	–
Manager:
(Costa Rica) Hernán Medford

13 May 2015
19:00 (UTC−06:00)
1st leg

Victoria	1–0	Motagua
Andino 67' (pen.)	Report

Estadio Nilmo Edwards
La Ceiba, Atlántida

Victoria	Motagua

GK	–	(Honduras) John Bodden
–	–	(Honduras) José Willians
–	–	(Argentina) Leonardo Domínguez
–	–	(Honduras) Henry Bermúdez
–	–	(Honduras) Nery Medina
–	–	(Honduras) Miguel Castillo
–	–	(Honduras) Rigoberto Padilla
–	–	(Honduras) Erick Andino
–	–	(Honduras) Félix Crisanto
–	–	(Honduras) Héctor Castellanos
–	–	Franco Tizera
Substitutions:
–	–
–	–
–	–
Manager:
(Honduras) Jorge Pineda

GK	–	(Argentina) Sebastián Portigliatti
–	–	(Honduras) Wilmer Crisanto	(substituted off) 61'
DF	–	(Honduras) Júnior Izaguirre
DF	–	(Honduras) Henry Figueroa
–	–	(Honduras) Reinieri Mayorquín
–	–	(Honduras) Irvin Reyna
–	–	(Honduras) César Oseguera
DF	–	(Honduras) Omar Elvir
MF	–	(Honduras) Carlos Discua
FW	–	(Honduras) Román Castillo
FW	–	(Argentina) Lucas Gómez	(substituted off) 80'
Substitutions:
–	–	(Honduras) Maylor Núñez	(substituted on) 61'
FW	–	(Brazil) Israel Silva
–	–
Manager:
(Argentina) Diego Vásquez

16 May 2015
19:00 (UTC−06:00)
2nd leg

Motagua	3–0	Victoria
Gómez 17'; Castillo 25' 54'	Report

Estadio Tiburcio Carías Andino
Tegucigalpa, Francisco Morazán
Referee: Héctor Rodríguez

Motagua	Victoria

GK	–	(Argentina) Sebastián Portigliatti
DF	–	(Honduras) Wilmer Crisanto
DF	–	(Honduras) Henry Figueroa
DF	4	(Honduras) Júnior Izaguirre
–	–	(Honduras) César Oseguera
MF	–	(Honduras) Carlos Discua	(substituted off) 79'
–	–	(Honduras) Reinieri Mayorquín	(substituted off) 82'
–	–	(Honduras) Irvin Reyna	(substituted off) 64'
DF	–	(Honduras) Omar Elvir
FW	–	(Honduras) Román Castillo
FW	–	(Argentina) Lucas Gómez
Substitutions:
–	–	(Argentina) Ricardo Rosales	(substituted on) 79'
–	–	(Honduras) Marvin Barrios	(substituted on) 82'
–	–	(Honduras) Orlin Peralta	(substituted on) 64'
Manager:
(Argentina) Diego Vásquez

GK	–	(Honduras) John Bodden
–	–	(Honduras) José Williams	(substituted off) 75'
–	–	(Honduras) Nery Medina
–	–	(Argentina) Leonardo Domínguez
–	–	(Honduras) Henry Bermúdez
–	–	(Honduras) Félix Crisanto
–	–	(Honduras) Héctor Castellanos	(substituted off) 57'
–	–	(Honduras) Rigoberto Padilla
–	–	(Honduras) Miguel Castillo
–	–	(Argentina) Franco Tisera
–	–	(Honduras) Erick Andino
Substitutions:
–	–	(Honduras) Misael Ruiz	(substituted on) 75'
–	–	(Honduras) Carlos Bernárdez	(substituted on) 57'
–	–
Manager:
(Honduras) Jorge Pineda

==== Final ====
1st seeded	Agg.	2nd seeded	1st leg	2nd leg
Olimpia	2–1	Motagua	2–1	0–0

Match details
20 May 2015
19:30 (UTC−06:00)
1st leg

Motagua	1–2	Olimpia
Discua 87'	Report	8' (pen.) 27' Lozano

Estadio Tiburcio Carías Andino
Tegucigalpa, Francisco Morazán
Referee: Héctor Rodríguez

Motagua	Olimpia

GK	1	(Argentina) Sebastián Portigliatti	(yellow card) 33'
DF	3	(Honduras) Henry Figueroa	(yellow card) 7'	(substituted off) 71'
DF	4	(Honduras) Júnior Izaguirre	(yellow card) 62'
DF	18	(Honduras) Wilmer Crisanto
DF	19	(Honduras) César Oseguera
DF	24	(Honduras) Omar Elvir
MF	7	(Honduras) Carlos Discua	(yellow card) 18'
MF	12	(Honduras) Reinieri Mayorquín	(substituted off) 64'
FW	9	(Honduras) Román Castillo
FW	11	(Argentina) Lucas Gómez
FW	14	(Honduras) Irvin Reyna	(substituted off) 80'
Substitutions:
MF	8	(Honduras) Orlin Peralta	(substituted on) 64'
MF	27	(Argentina) Ricardo Rosales	(substituted on) 71'
FW	10	(Brazil) Israel Silva	(substituted on) 80'
Manager:
(Argentina) Diego Vásquez

GK	27	(Honduras) Noel Valladares
DF	4	(Brazil) Fábio de Souza
DF	5	(Honduras) Ever Alvarado
DF	22	(Honduras) Edgard Flores
DF	30	(Honduras) Johnny Palacios
MF	7	(Honduras) Carlos Mejía	(substituted off) 57'
MF	16	(Honduras) Bayron Méndez
MF	20	(Honduras) Óliver Morazán
MF	26	(Honduras) Óscar Salas
FW	9	(Honduras) Anthony Lozano	(substituted off) 68'
FW	31	(Honduras) Romell Quioto	(substituted off) 76'
Substitutions:
MF	23	(Honduras) Arnold Peralta	(substituted on) 57'
FW	18	(Colombia) Javier Estupiñán	(substituted on) 68'
DF	12	(Honduras) Bryan Johnson	(substituted on) 86'
Manager:
(Argentina) Héctor Vargas

24 May 2015
16:00 (UTC−06:00)
2nd leg

Olimpia	0–0	Motagua
	Report

Estadio Tiburcio Carías Andino
Tegucigalpa, Francisco Morazán
Referee: Melvin Matamoros

Olimpia	Motagua

GK	28	(Honduras) Donis Escober
DF	4	(Brazil) Fábio de Souza
DF	5	(Honduras) Ever Alvarado	(yellow card) 2'
DF	30	(Honduras) Johnny Palacios
MF	7	(Honduras) Carlos Mejía	(yellow card) 24'	(substituted off) 67'
MF	16	(Honduras) Bayron Méndez
MF	20	(Honduras) Óliver Morazán
MF	23	(Honduras) Arnold Peralta
MF	26	(Honduras) Óscar Salas
FW	9	(Honduras) Anthony Lozano	(substituted off) 61'
FW	31	(Honduras) Romell Quioto	(yellow card) 82'
Substitutions:
FW	18	(Colombia) Javier Estupiñán	(substituted on) 61'
MF	29	(Honduras) German Mejía	(substituted on) 67'
–	–
Manager:
(Argentina) Héctor Vargas

GK	1	(Argentina) Sebastián Portigliatti
DF	2	(Honduras) Juan Montes
DF	3	(Honduras) Henry Figueroa
DF	4	(Honduras) Júnior Izaguirre	(yellow card) 74'	(substituted off) 80'
DF	18	(Honduras) Wilmer Crisanto	(substituted off) 72'
DF	24	(Honduras) Omar Elvir
MF	6	(Honduras) Reinieri Mayorquín	(yellow card) 4'	(substituted off) 85'
MF	7	(Honduras) Carlos Discua
MF	14	(Honduras) Irvin Reyna	Red card
FW	9	(Honduras) Román Castillo
FW	11	(Argentina) Lucas Gómez
Substitutions:
FW	10	(Brazil) Israel Silva	(substituted on) 72'
DF	19	(Honduras) César Oseguera	(substituted on) 80'
MF	17	(Honduras) Júnior Padilla	(substituted on) 85'
Manager:
(Argentina) Diego Vásquez

== Top goalscorers ==
As of 24 May 2015

- 29 goals:

(Honduras) Román Castillo (Motagua)

- 25 goals:

(Honduras) Anthony Lozano (Olimpia)

- 19 goals:

(Honduras) Erick Andino (Victoria)

- 18 goals:

(Uruguay) Claudio Cardozo (Real España)

- 17 goals:

(Honduras) Carlos Discua (Motagua)

- 16 goals:

(Honduras) Iván López (Parrillas One)
(Honduras) Romell Quioto (Olimpia)
(Argentina) Lucas Gómez (Motagua)

- 14 goals:

(Honduras) Eddie Hernández (Vida)
Ángel Tejeda (Honduras Progreso)
(Honduras) Juan Rodríguez (Parrillas One)

- 11 goals:

(Honduras) Julio de León (Platense)

- 10 goals:

Juan Ocampo (Honduras Progreso)

- 8 goals:

(Honduras) Bryan Róchez (Real España)
(Colombia) Roberto Riascos (Vida)
(Colombia) Mario Abadía (Platense)
(Honduras) Diego Reyes (Marathón)
(Honduras) Melvin Valladares (Victoria)

- 7 goals:

Jorge Zaldívar (Honduras Progreso)
(Colombia) Javier Estupiñán (Olimpia)
(Honduras) Osman Melgares (Real Sociedad)
(Colombia) Charles Córdoba (Marathón)

- 6 goals:

(Honduras) Rony Martínez (Real Sociedad)
(Honduras) Alberth Elis (Olimpia)
(Honduras) José Tobías (Real Sociedad)

- 5 goals:

(Honduras) Rony Flores (Real España / Platense)
(Honduras) Félix Crisanto (Victoria)
(Honduras) Sergio Mendoza (Real España)
(Honduras) Henry Clark (Real Sociedad)
(Honduras) Cholby Martínez (Vida)
(Honduras) Mario Berríos (Marathón)

- 4 goals:

Edwin León (Honduras Progreso)
(Honduras) Carlos Bernárdez (Victoria)
(Honduras) Júnior Izaguirre (Motagua)
(Honduras) Edder Delgado (Real España)
Luis Lobo (Real España / Honduras Progreso)
(Brazil) Fábio de Souza (Olimpia)
(Honduras) Christian Martínez (Marathón)
(Honduras) Darwin Bermúdez (Parrillas One)
(Honduras) Bryan Acosta (Real España)
Jorge Cardona (Honduras Progreso)
(Honduras) Miguel Valerio (Vida)
Luis Alvarado (Honduras Progreso)
(Honduras) Nery Medina (Victoria)

- 3 goals:

(Colombia) Omar Guerra (Olimpia)
(Honduras) Víctor Ortiz (Vida)
(Honduras) Jerrick Díaz (Platense)
(Honduras) Reynaldo Tilguath (Vida)
(Brazil) Jocimar Moreira (Parrillas One)
(Honduras) Juan Mejía (Real España)
(Brazil) Israel Silva (Motagua)
(Honduras) Henry Bermúdez (Victoria)
(Honduras) Alexander Aguilar (Platense)
(Honduras) Jesús Canales (Vida)
(Honduras) Jairo Puerto (Marathón)
(Honduras) Walter Martínez (Marathón)
(Honduras) Juan Munguía (Real Sociedad)
(Honduras) Allan Lalín (Platense)
(Honduras) Henry Martínez (Real Sociedad)
Leonardo Isaula (Honduras Progreso)
Aly Arriola (Honduras Progreso)
(Uruguay) Julio Rodríguez (Real España)
(Honduras) Elkin González (Real Sociedad)
Franklyn Morales (Honduras Progreso)

- 2 goals:

(Honduras) Bayron Méndez (Olimpia)
(Honduras) Wilmer Crisanto (Motagua)
(Honduras) Devron García (Victoria)
(Honduras) Christian Altamirano (Platense)
(Honduras) Cristian Lara (Platense)
(Honduras) Johnny Barrios (Marathón)
(Uruguay) Ramiro Bruschi (Real España)
(Argentina) Leandro Guaita (Vida)
(Honduras) Franco Güity (Victoria)
(Honduras) Walter Castro (Platense)
Christopher Anariba (Honduras Progreso)
(Honduras) Ramón Núñez (Real España)
(Honduras) César Zelaya (Real Sociedad)
(Honduras) Carlos Solórzano (Parrillas One)
(Honduras) Lesther Zavala (Parrillas One)
(Honduras) Pablo Arzú (Real Sociedad)
Luis Guzmán (Honduras Progreso)
(Honduras) Rigoberto Padilla (Victoria)
Víctor Moncada (Honduras Progreso)
(Honduras) Osman Chávez (Platense)
(Honduras) Mario Martínez (Real España)
(Honduras) Melvin Batiz (Real Sociedad)
(Honduras) Marco Vega (Marathón)
(Uruguay) Mario Leguizamón (Olimpia)
(Honduras) Fredixon Elvir (Olimpia)
(Honduras) Douglas Martínez (Vida)
(Honduras) Óscar Bonilla (Marathón)
(Honduras) Juan Romero (Parrillas One)
(Honduras) Omar Elvir (Motagua)
(Honduras) Ian Osorio (Platense)
Pastor Martínez (Honduras Progreso)
(Honduras) Chestyn Onofre (Vida)
(Honduras) Julio Bernárdez (Parrillas One)
Pedro Mencía (Honduras Progreso)
(Costa Rica) Víctor Núñez (Real España)

- 1 goal:

(Honduras) Dílmer Gutiérrez (Real Sociedad)
(Honduras) Níxon Duarte (Platense)
(Honduras) Jhow Benavídez (Real España)
(Argentina) Juan Rial (Marathón)
(Honduras) Jorge Bengoché (Olimpia)
(Honduras) Reinieri Mayorquín (Motagua)
(Brazil) Wesley Braz (Marathón)
(Belize) Elroy Smith (Platense)
(Honduras) Henry Figueroa (Motagua)
(Honduras) Hárlinton Gutiérrez (Real España)
(Honduras) Nelson Álvarez (Parrillas One)
(Honduras) Carlos Mejía (Olimpia)
(Honduras) Arnulfo Beitar (Parrillas One)
(Brazil) Ronaldo Barbosa (Vida)
(Argentina) Ricardo Rosales (Motagua)
(Honduras) Ever Alvarado (Olimpia)
(Honduras) Johnny Leverón (Marathón)
(Honduras) Clayvin Zúniga (Real Sociedad)
(Honduras) Maynor Gómez (Parrillas One)
(Honduras) Mariano Acevedo (Olimpia)
(Honduras) David Meza (Olimpia)
(Honduras) Marcelo Espinal (Vida)
(Honduras) Darixon Vuelto (Victoria)
(Honduras) Odis Borjas (Platense)
(Honduras) Bryan Johnson (Olimpia)
(Honduras) Sergio Zelaya (Real Sociedad)
(Honduras) Carlos Palacios (Marathón)
(Honduras) Joshua Vargas (Platense)
(Honduras) Walter Hernández (Platense)
(Honduras) Jeffri Flores (Real España)
(Colombia) Andrés Copete (Parrillas One)
(Honduras) German Mejía (Olimpia)
(Honduras) Wilmer Fuentes (Marathón)
(Honduras) Gerson Rodas (Real España)
(Honduras) Kevin López (Motagua)
(Honduras) Néstor Martínez (Olimpia)
(Honduras) John Suazo (Marathón)
(Colombia) Camilo Aguirre (Real España)
Francisco Benítez (Honduras Progreso)
(Brazil) Romário Pinto (Marathón)
(Honduras) Johny Gómez (Parrillas One)
(Honduras) Irvin Reyna (Motagua)
Carlos Sánchez (Honduras Progreso)
(Honduras) Marcelo Santos (Vida)
(Honduras) Jefferson Bernárdez (Parrillas One)
(Honduras) Ozzie Bodden (Real Sociedad)
(Honduras) David Carranza (Real Sociedad)
(Honduras) Johnny Palacios (Olimpia)
(Argentina) Franco Tisera (Victoria)
(Honduras) Dicktmar Hernández (Victoria)
Víctor Zúniga (Honduras Progreso)

- 1 own goal:

(Honduras) Henry Figueroa (Motagua)
(Honduras) Romell Quioto (Olimpia)
(Honduras) Robbie Matute (Real Sociedad)
(Honduras) Mauricio Sabillón (Marathón)
(Honduras) Quiarol Arzú (Platense)

- 2 own goals:

(Argentina) Leonardo Domínguez (Victoria)

== Aggregate table ==
Relegation is determined by the aggregated table of both Apertura and Clausura tournaments. On 19 April 2015, Parrillas One was relegated to Liga de Ascenso after drawing 2–2 at home against C.D. Real Sociedad.

Pos	Team	Pld	W	D	L	GF	GA	GD	Pts	Qualification or relegation
1	Olimpia	36	19	10	7	71	38	+33	67	2015–16 CONCACAF Champions League
2	Motagua	36	19	8	9	67	46	+21	65	2015–16 CONCACAF Champions League
3	Marathón	36	13	12	11	40	48	−8	51	
4	Real España	36	12	14	10	58	53	+5	50	
5	Real Sociedad	36	11	16	9	39	34	+5	49	
6	Honduras Progreso	36	12	10	14	60	66	−6	46	
7	Victoria	36	9	14	13	48	56	−8	41	
8	Platense	36	9	12	15	50	61	−11	39	
9	Vida	36	9	12	15	50	61	−11	39	
10	Parrillas One	36	8	10	18	53	73	−20	34	Relegation to the 2015–16 Liga de Ascenso

Updated to match(es) played on 2 May 2015. Source:
