= Melgares =

Melgares is a surname. Notable people with the surname include:

- Facundo Melgares (1775-after 1823), Spanish military officer
- Osman Melgares (born 1986), Honduran footballer
