= Rony Martínez =

Honduran footballer (born 1987)

Personal information
- Full name: Rony Darío Martínez Alméndarez
- Date of birth: October 16, 1987 (age 39)
- Place of birth: Olanchito, Honduras
- Height: 1.80 m (5 ft 11 in)
- Position: Forward

Team information
- Current team: Real Sociedad
- Number: 11

Senior career*
Years	Team	Apps	(Gls)
–2012	Unión Sabá	28	(22)
2012–2017	Real Sociedad	151	(71)
2017	→ Baoding Rongda (loan)	15	(4)
2018	Olimpia	34	(10)
2019–2021	Real España	55	(14)
2021-	Real Sociedad	118	(30)

International career^{‡}
2013–2017	Honduras	15	(2)
- * Club domestic league appearances and goals as of 20 January 2021 ‡ National team caps and goals as of 13 October 2018

Rony Darío Martínez Alméndarez (born October 16, 1987) is a Honduran professional footballer who plays as a forward currently plays for Real Sociedad.

== Club career ==
Martínez was loaned from Unión Sabá without a cost to Real Sociedad. This was done by Unión's chairman, Arnulfo Vargas, in order to provide exposure for the talent that Martínez is. In the 2012-13, 2013-14, and 2016–17 seasons, Martinez finished as the league's top goalscorer.

== Career statistics ==
=== Club ===
As of 26 April 2024

Club	Season	Division	League		Cup		Europe		Total	
Club	Season	Division	Apps	Goals	Apps	Goals	Apps	Goals	Apps	Goals
Real Sociedad	2012–13	Liga Nacional	20	12	—		—		20	12
Real Sociedad	2013–14	Liga Nacional	38	22	—		—		38	22
Real Sociedad	2014–15	Liga Nacional	21	5	—		—		21	5
Real Sociedad	2015–16	Liga Nacional	32	9	—		—		32	9
Real Sociedad	2016–17	Liga Nacional	40	23	—		—		40	23
Real Sociedad	Total		151	71	—		—		151	71
Baoding Yingli ETS (loan)	2017	China League One	15	4	—		—		15	4
Olimpia	2017–18	Liga Nacional	18	6	—		2	0	20	6
Olimpia	2018–19	Liga Nacional	16	4	—		—		16	4
Olimpia	Total		34	10	—		2	0	36	10
Real España	2018–19	Liga Nacional	16	2	—		—		16	2
Real España	2019–20	Liga Nacional	26	10	—		—		26	10
Real España	2020–21	Liga Nacional	13	2	—		—		13	2
Real España	Total		55	14	—		—		55	14
Real Sociedad	2020–21	Liga Nacional	14	8	—		—		14	8
Real Sociedad	2021–22	Liga Nacional	32	6	—		—		32	6
Real Sociedad	2022–23	Liga Nacional	36	5	—		—		36	5
Real Sociedad	2023–24	Liga Nacional	36	11	—		—		36	11
Real Sociedad	Total		118	30	—		—		118	30
Career Total			373	129	0	0	2	0	375	129

=== International ===
As of match played 14 June 2017

Appearances and goals by national team and year
National team	Year	Apps	Goals
Honduras
Honduras	2013	6	1
Honduras	2014	5	0
Honduras	2016	2	0
Honduras	2017	2	1
Total		15	2

=== International goals ===
Scores and results list Honduras's goal tally first.
As of 27 May 2017

No	Date	Venue	Opponent	Score	Result	Competition
1.	9 July 2013	Red Bull Arena, Harrison, United States	Haiti	1–0	2–0	2013 CONCACAF Gold Cup
2.	27 May 2017	RFK Stadium, Washington, D.C., United States	El Salvador	2–0	2–2	Friendly
