= Bryan Róchez =

Honduran footballer (born 1995)

Personal information
- Full name: Bryan Giovanni Róchez Mejía
- Date of birth: 1 January 1995 (age 31)
- Place of birth: Tegucigalpa, Honduras
- Height: 1.83 m (6 ft 0 in)
- Position: Striker

Team information
- Current team: Leixões (on loan from Petro de Luanda)
- Number: 35

Youth career
- Real España

Senior career*
Years	Team	Apps	(Gls)
2012–2014	Real España	62	(30)
2015–2017	Orlando City	16	(3)
2016	Orlando City B	10	(2)
2016	→ Real España (loan)	15	(6)
2017	Atlanta United	0	(0)
2017–2022	Nacional	124	(44)
2022–2024	Portimonense	21	(1)
2023–2024	→ União de Leiria (loan)	22	(11)
2024–	Petro de Luanda	12	(4)
2025	→ Mafra (loan)	16	(3)
2025–	→ Leixões (loan)	35	(14)

International career^{‡}
2011	Honduras U17	3	(2)
2012–2015	Honduras U20	9	(6)
2014–	Honduras	30	(6)
- * Club domestic league appearances and goals as of 28 September 2026 ‡ National team caps and goals as of 28 September 2026

Bryan Giovanni Róchez Mejía (born 1 January 1995) is a Honduran professional footballer who plays as a striker for Liga Portugal 2 club Leixões, on loan from Girabola club Petro de Luanda, and the Honduras national football team.

== Club career ==
=== Real España ===
Born in Tegucigalpa and raised in Tornabé, Róchez joined Real España at a young age. After progressing through the club's youth system, he made his senior debut in 2012. His first Liga Nacional appearance for the club came on 13 October 2012, in a 1–1 draw at home against Deportes Savio in the Apertura tournament; He played as a starter and was replaced by Allan Lalín in the 53rd minute. He scored his first goal on 24 March 2013, the equalizer in a 1–1 draw against Marathón in the Sampedran Derby. By the end of the 2013–14 season, Róchez had scored 20 goals for Real España to finish as the second highest goalscorer in the league, a campaign that saw Real España crowned as the Apertura champions.

=== Orlando City ===
On 15 December 2014, Major League Soccer expansion side Orlando City announced the signing of Róchez as a Designated Player, making him one of the youngest Designated Players in MLS history at only 19 years old. He made his MLS debut on 8 March 2015, a 1–1 home draw against fellow newcomers New York City. He entered as a second-half substitute in the 80th minute in place of Lewis Neal. Róchez scored his first goal for The Lions on the following 13 September, in a 3–1 win against Sporting Kansas City.

He was loaned to Orlando City B in March 2016. He made his debut on 26 March in Orlando's opening game against Wilmington Hammerheads in the United Soccer League. He came on as a second-half substitute for Richie Laryea, playing 20 minutes in a 2–1 loss. He scored his first goal on 26 April in a 2–1 loss against Harrisburg City Islanders.

==== Loan return to Real España ====
On 22 July 2016, Róchez returned to Real España on loan after having not made a single appearance for Orlando City during the season. He played his first game on 10 August in a 1–0 loss against Olimpia in the league. 18 days later, he scored his first goal since his return as Real España defeated Honduras Progreso 4–1.

=== Atlanta United ===
On 17 March 2017, Róchez was waived by Orlando City. However, Róchez was quickly claimed by new expansion side Atlanta United.

=== Nacional ===
On 22 August 2017, Róchez left Atlanta United and joined Portuguese LigaPro club Nacional. He made his debut the following 24 September in a 3–1 away victory against Condeixa in the second round of the Taça de Portugal. He made his league debut on 1 October in the 5–4 away defeat to Braga B, he also scored his first goal and Nacional's third. On 29 December 2021, Róchez scored a hat-trick in Nacional's 4–1 home win against Académico de Viseu, in the process becoming the top scorer in the history of the club.

=== Portimonense ===
On 13 July 2022, Primeira Liga club Portimonense presented the signing of Róchez in a press conference. He made his debut for the club on 27 August, coming on as an extra-time substitute on a 1–0 win away at Marítimo. On 5 May 2023, Róchez scored his first goal for Portimonense, a last-minute equalizer on a 1–1 away draw at Casa Pia.

==== Loan to União de Leiria ====
On 24 July 2023, União de Leiria, recently promoted to Liga Portugal 2, announced the signing of Róchez from Portimonense on a season-long loan. He would make his official debut the following 30 July in the second round of the Taça da Liga, converting a penalty in a 3–3 draw (5–4 defeat on pens) against his former club Nacional.

=== Petro Atlético de Luanda ===
On 9 July 2024, Angolan Girabola club Petro de Luanda announced the signing of Róchez. Róchez featured in the 2024 edition of the Supertaça de Angola, coming on as a subsititute in the second-half against Bravos do Maquis. After a 1–1 draw during full-time, Petro won the super cup 5–4 on penalties. He scored his first goal in the league the following 9 November in a 1–1 draw with Recreativo do Libolo away from home.

==== Loan to Mafra ====
On 15 January 2025, Róchez returned to the Portuguese second division, signing with Mafra for the remainder of the 2024–25 season. He made his league debut for Mafra the following 26 January, coming off the bench in a 0–0 draw with Oliveirense. He scored his first goal for the side on 16 March, in a 3–1 away loss to his former club União de Leiria. Róchez would finish his loan spell with 3 goals in 16 appearances as Mafra were relegated to Liga 3.

==== Loan to Leixões ====
On 14 August 2025, Róchez joined Leixões in the second division on a season-long loan. In May 2026, Leixões and Petro Luanda reached an agreement to extend their loan arrangement until June 2027, following a season where Róchez scored 10 goals in 29 appearances.

== International career ==
Róchez made his senior national team debut for Honduras on 17 November 2014 in a friendly against China, starting in a 0–0 draw.

In April 2015, he was called up to represent Honduras in the 2015 FIFA U-20 World Cup in New Zealand. On 1 June, he scored a brace in the first group stage match of the tournament against Uzbekistan in an eventual 4–3 win. He would feature in all three group stage matches as Honduras were eliminated in the first round.

On 15 October 2023, Róchez scored his first goal for the national team in a 4–0 win against Cuba in the CONCACAF Nations League. The following 18 November, Róchez scored again for Honduras, this time in the 2–0 victory against Mexico in the first leg of the League A quarter-finals.

== Career statistics ==
=== Club ===
As of matches played 27 May 2026

Appearances and goals by club, season and competition
Club	Season	League			National cup		League cup		Continental		Other		Total	
Club	Season	Division	Apps	Goals	Apps	Goals	Apps	Goals	Apps	Goals	Apps	Goals	Apps	Goals
Real España	2012–13	Liga Nacional	7	2	—		—		—		—		7	2
Real España	2013–14	Liga Nacional	40	20	—		—		3 (Note: Appearances in CONCACAF Champions League)	1	—		43	21
Real España	2014–15	Liga Nacional	15	8	—		—		—		—		15	8
Real España	Total		62	30	—		—		3	1	—		65	31
Orlando City	2015	MLS	16	3	0	0	—		—		—		16	3
Orlando City B	2016	United Soccer League	10	2	—		—		—		—		10	2
Real España (loan)	2016–17	Liga Nacional	15	6	—		—		—		—		15	6
Nacional	2017–18	LigaPro	15	6	1	0	—		—		—		16	6
Nacional	2018–19	Primeira Liga	30	10	1	0	1	1	—		—		32	11
Nacional	2019–20	LigaPro	19	7	1	0	1	2	—		—		21	9
Nacional	2020–21	Primeira Liga	33	6	3	1	—		—		—		36	7
Nacional	2021–22	Liga Portugal 2	27	15	1	0	1	1	—		—		29	16
Nacional	Total		165	55	7	1	3	4	—		—		175	60
Portimonense	2022–23	Primeira Liga	21	1	1	0	2	0	—		—		24	1
União de Leiria (loan)	2023–24	Liga Portugal 2	22	11	3	3	1	1	—		—		26	15
Petro de Luanda	2024–25	Girabola	12	4	—		—		1 (Note: Appearance in CAF Champions League)	0	1 (Note: Appearance in Supertaça de Angola)	0	14	4
Mafra (loan)	2024–25	Liga Portugal 2	16	3	—		—		—		—		16	3
Leixões (loan)	2025–26	Liga Portugal 2	29	10	3	0	0	0	—		—		32	10
Leixões (loan)	Total		100	29	7	3	3	1	1	0	1	0	112	33
Career total			327	114	14	4	6	5	4	1	1	0	352	124

=== International ===
As of match played 16 June 2024
Scores and results list Honduras' goal tally first, score column indicates score after each Róchez goal.

List of international goals scored by Bryan Róchez
No.	Date	Venue	Opponent	Score	Result	Competition
1	15 October 2023	Estadio Nacional Chelato Uclés, Tegucigalpa, Honduras	Cuba	4–0	4–0	2023–24 CONCACAF Nations League
2	17 November 2023	Estadio Nacional Chelato Uclés, Tegucigalpa, Honduras	Mexico	2–0	2–0	2023–24 CONCACAF Nations League
3	26 March 2024	Shell Energy Stadium, Houston, United States	El Salvador	1–1	1–1	Friendly
4	10 June 2024	Bermuda National Stadium, Devonshire Parish, Bermuda	Bermuda	6–1	6–1	2026 FIFA World Cup qualification
5	16 June 2024	Pratt & Whitney Stadium, East Hartford, United States	Ecuador	1–1	1–2	Friendly
6	25 September 2026	Chelato Uclés National Stadium, Tegucigalpa, Honduras	Suriname	2–1	2–3	2026–27 CONCACAF Nations League A

== Honours ==
Real España

- Liga Nacional: 2013 Apertura

Nacional

- LigaPro: 2017–18

Petro de Luanda

- Girabola: 2024–25
- Supertaça de Angola: 2024
