= Luis Ramírez (footballer, born 1977) =

Honduran footballer

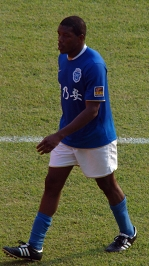

Personal information
- Full name: Luis Alfredo Ramírez Quioto
- Date of birth: 21 November 1977 (age 48)
- Place of birth: San Pedro Sula, Honduras
- Height: 1.85 m (6 ft 1 in)
- Position: Striker

Senior career*
Years	Team	Apps	(Gls)
1997–1998	Independiente	18	(5)
1998–2000	Real España	49	(19)
1999–2000	Limeno		
2001	Guangzhou Geely		
2001–2002	Universidad	31	(3)
2002–2003	Honduras Salzburg	32	(3)
2003–2004	Victoria	66	(24)
2005	Marathón	19	(9)
2006	Shanghai Shenhua	27	(13)
2007–2009	Guangzhou Pharmaceutical	81	(48)
2009	Marathón	6	(3)
2010–2011	Hangzhou Greentown	57	(21)
2012	Marathón	20	(7)
2012	Honduras de El Progreso		(10)
2013–2014	Deportes Savio	32	(13)
2014	Marathón	16	(5)
2015	Deportes Savio	20	

International career^{‡}
2000–2011	Honduras	9	(1)
Medal record
Honduras
Second place	UNCAF Nations Cup	2005
- * Club domestic league appearances and goals as of 30 January 2012 ‡ National team caps and goals as of 30 January 2011

Luis Alfredo Ramírez Quioto (Latin American Spanish: [lwis alˈfɾeðo raˈmiɾes]; born 21 November 1977), nicknamed El Bombero ([el βomˈbeɾo]; (Note: In isolation, Bombero is pronounced [bomˈbeɾo].)), is a Honduran former footballer who played as a striker. He is nicknamed Bombero because he used to work at a gas station as a gas pump attendant.

== Club career ==
Ramírez started his career at Independiente and made his professional debut on 10 June 1998 against Olimpia. He then played for Real España before a short stint with Chinese team Guangzhou Jili Cars. On his return to Honduras, he played for Universidad, Honduras Salzburg, Victoria and Marathón. He scored 59 league goals for them altogether from his debut until 2009.

=== China ===
Starting in 2006, Ramírez spent six years playing in China, playing for Shanghai Shenhua, Guangzhou Pharmaceutical and Hangzhou Greentown. In between he played the 2009 Clausura season with Marathón. Ramírez scored two goals for Guangzhou Pharmaceutical against Wuhan Guanggu in a 3-1 win on the opening fixture of the 2008 Chinese Super League Season. He is the first and the only player to win both Chinese Jia League and Chinese Super League golden boot award.

=== Return to Honduras ===
He returned to Honduras to play for Marathón in the 2012 Clausura. In summer 2012, el Bombero joined Honduras de El Progreso of the Honduran second division but he returned to the top flight to play in the 2013 Clausura for Deportes Savio.

=== Club career statistics in China ===
Club performance			League		Cup		League Cup		Continental		Total	
Season	Club	League	Apps	Goals	Apps	Goals	Apps	Goals	Apps	Goals	Apps	Goals
China PR			League		FA Cup		CSL Cup		Asia		Total	
2001	Guangzhou Geely	Chinese Jia-B League	4	0	0	0	-		-		4	0
2006	Shanghai Shenhua	Chinese Super League	27	13	2	0	-		2	0	31	13
2007	Guangzhou Pharmaceutical	Chinese Jia League	23	19	-		-		-		23	19
2008	Guangzhou Pharmaceutical	Chinese Super League	28	12	-		-		-		28	12
2009	Guangzhou Pharmaceutical	Chinese Super League	30	17	-		-		-		30	17
2010	Hangzhou Greentown	Chinese Super League	30	14	-		-		-		30	14
2011	Hangzhou Greentown	Chinese Super League	27	7	1	0	-		6	1	34	8
Total	China PR		169	82	3	0	-		8	1	180	83

Statistics accurate as of 2 November 2011

=== Club career statistics in Marathón ===
Club performance			League	
Season	Club	League	Apps	Goals
Honduras			League	
2005–06 A	Marathón	Honduran national league	19	9
2008–09 C	Marathón	Honduran national league	6	3
2011–12 C	Marathón	Honduran national league	20	7
2013–14 C	Marathón	Honduran national league	16	5
Total	Honduras		61	24

Statistics accurate as of May 2014

== International career ==
Ramírez made his senior debut for Honduras in an April 2000 FIFA World Cup qualification match against Nicaragua and he immediately scored his first international goal when coming on as a late sub for Milton Reyes. He has earned a total of 9 caps, scoring 1 goal. He represented his country in only 1 FIFA World Cup qualification match and played at the 2000 Summer Olympics. Ramirez also played for Honduras at the 1999 Pan American Games. He played at the 2005 UNCAF Nations Cup and 2011 Copa Centroamericana.

His final international was a January 2011 Copa Centroamericana match against El Salvador.

=== International goals ===
N.	Date	Venue	Opponent	Score	Result	Competition
1	16 April 2000	Estadio Cacique Diriangén, Diriamba, Nicaragua	Nicaragua	1–0	1–0	2002 FIFA World Cup qualification

== Honours ==
Guangzhou Pharmaceutical

- China League One: 2007

Individual

- China League One Golden Boot Winner: 2007
- Chinese Super League Golden Boot Winner: 2009
