= Osman Melgares =

Honduran footballer (born 1986)

Personal information
- Date of birth: 27 November 1986 (age 39)
- Place of birth: Tocoa, Honduras
- Height: 1.70 m (5 ft 7 in)
- Position: Midfielder

Team information
- Current team: Real Sociedad
- Number: 17

Senior career*
Years	Team	Apps	(Gls)
2012–	Real Sociedad	112	(15)
2015	→ Indy Eleven (loan)	6	(0)
- * Club domestic league appearances and goals as of 29 January 2016

Osman Melgares (born 27 November 1986) is a Honduran footballer who currently plays for Real Sociedad of the Honduran Liga Nacional.

== Career ==
=== Club ===
In February 2015, Melgares signed for Indy Eleven of the North American Soccer League, on a six-month loan deal. Melgares returned to Real Sociedad in July of the same year.

== Personal life ==
In July 2015, shortly after returning to Honduras from his short spell with Indy Eleven, Melgares was involved in a car accident in which he broke his arm.

== Career statistics ==
As of match played 24 January 2016

Club	Season	League			National Cup		Continental		Total	
Club	Season	Division	Apps	Goals	Apps	Goals	Apps	Goals	Apps	Goals
Real Sociedad	2012–13	Liga de Nacional	29	3			-		29	3
Real Sociedad	2013–14	Liga de Nacional	36	4			-		36	4
Real Sociedad	2014–15	Liga de Nacional	29	7			-		29	7
Real Sociedad	2015–16	Liga de Nacional	18	1			-		3	0
Real Sociedad	Total		112	15			-	-	112	15
Indy Eleven (loan)	2015	NASL	6	0	1	0	–		7	0
Career total			118	15			-	-	119	15
