= Marcelo Souza =

Brazilian footballer (born 1969)

Personal information
- Full name: Marcelo Tomé de Souza
- Date of birth: 21 April 1969 (age 57)
- Place of birth: Brazil
- Height: 1.81 m (5 ft 11 in)
- Position: Defender

Senior career*
Years	Team	Apps	(Gls)
?–2003	EC Bahia	?	(?)
2004	FC Seoul	20	(0)
2005–?	?	?	(?)
- * Club domestic league appearances and goals as of 15 August 2011

Marcelo Tomé De Souza (born 21 April 1969) is a Brazilian footballer, who played as a defender for South Korean K-League side FC Seoul.

He only played one season in FC Seoul and left team.
