= Irbin Guerrero =

Honduran footballer

Irvin Guerrero
Personal information
- Full name: Irbin Alberto Guerrero Hylton
- Date of birth: 18 April 1985 (age 41)
- Place of birth: Sonaguera, Honduras
- Position: Defender

Team information
- Current team: Platense
- Number: 23

Youth career
- 2001–2003: Olimpia
- 2004–2006: Marathón

Senior career*
Years	Team	Apps	(Gls)
2008–2009	Platense		(6)
2009–2010	Juventud Esteli		(4)
2010–2012	Deportes Savio	24	(4)
2012	Vida	11	(5)
2013–	Platense	24	(2)

International career^{‡}
2011–	Honduras	1	(0)
- * Club domestic league appearances and goals as of 3 October 2015 ‡ National team caps and goals as of 3 January 2012

Irvin Alberto Guerrero Hylton (born 26 April 1984) in Honduras is a footballer who currently plays as a defender for Platense in the Liga Nacional de Fútbol de Honduras.

== Club career ==
Guerrero played for Platense and Real Juventud.

=== Deportes Savio ===
In 2010, he signed for LINA club Deportes Savio. He joined Vida for the 2012 Clausura.

== International career ==
Guerrero made his debut for Honduras in a November 2011 friendly match against Serbia, his only cap so far.
