= Allan Alemán =

Costa Rican footballer (born 1983)

Personal information
- Full name: Allan Alemán Avila
- Date of birth: 29 July 1983 (age 43)
- Place of birth: San José, Costa Rica
- Height: 1.64 m (5 ft 5 in)
- Position: Winger

Youth career
- Saprissa

Senior career*
Years	Team	Apps	(Gls)
2003–2007	Saprissa	78	(13)
2007	Puntarenas	7	(2)
2007–2009	Liberia Mia	36	(5)
2009	Brujas	12	(1)
2010–2012	Saprissa	44	(2)
2012–2013	Xelajú	36	(5)
2013–2014	Real España	35	(4)
2014	Xinjiang Tianshan Leopard	14	(2)
2015	Uruguay de Coronado		
2016–2018	Municipal Grecia	34	(5)
2018–2019	Municipal Grecia	10	(3)

International career
2007–2008	Costa Rica	10	(0)

Managerial career
- 2019: Municipal Grecia (caretaker)
- * Club domestic league appearances and goals

Allan Alemán Avila (Spanish pronunciation: [ˈalan aleˈman]; born 29 July 1983 in San José, Costa Rica) is a retired Costa Rican professional football player.

== Club career ==
Alemán made his professional debut with Deportivo Saprissa where he was known for his hard work on the field, his quickness, scoring skills and most of all his talent for creating assists.

With Saprissa he won two national championships, as well as an UNCAF Cup title and a CONCACAF Champions Cup title. After the Clausura 2007 tournament, he signed with Italian businessman Matteo Quintavalle, which meant his departure from the team, seeing as Quintavalle is not a FIFA-licensed player's agent, and Saprissa would not negotiate with him. Quintavalle was accused of fraud, and Alemán left Quintavalle (after a breach of contract by Quintavalle), and signed with Puntarenas F.C. on his own. 5 days before the transfer window closed, Aleman signed with Liberia Mia, but was allowed to play 2 more matches with Puntarenas against Saprissa, one of them for the UNCAF Cup Semifinals. Later he signed with Brujas but in January 2010, he returned to Saprissa. Alemán participated in the 2005 FIFA Club World Championship with his team, who ended up in third place, behind São Paulo Futebol Clube and Liverpool F.C.

On 23 July 2014, Alemán transferred to China League One side Xinjiang Tianshan Leopard.

=== Abroad ===
In 2012, Allan decided to go to the Xelajú in Guatemala who were managed by compatriot Hernán Medford. On 25 October, Alemán scores a consolation goal in a 1–2 loss to Guadalajara in the 2012–13 CONCACAF Champions League, which was crucial in making Xelajú top the group on head-to-head away goals, thus becoming just the second Guatemalan team to ever advance to the quarterfinals. In summer 2013 he moved to Honduran football, joining Medford's new club Real España.

== International career ==
Alemán has made ten appearances for the senior Costa Rica national football team, his debut coming in a friendly against Chile on 2 June 2007. He appeared in two matches for Costa Rica at the 2007 CONCACAF Gold Cup.
