= Luis Maldonado (footballer, born 1985) =

Uruguayan footballer

Personal information
- Full name: Luis Eduardo Maldonado Presa
- Date of birth: 26 March 1985 (age 41)
- Place of birth: Montevideo, Uruguay
- Height: 1.84 m (6 ft 0 in)
- Position: Centre back

Team information
- Current team: Rampla Juniors

Youth career
- Progreso

Senior career*
Years	Team	Apps	(Gls)
2007	Progreso		
2008	Villa Española		
2009	Portuguesa FC		
2009–2010	El Tanque Sisley		
2010	Durazno FC		
2011	Sportivo Luqueño	5	(0)
2011–2012	Boston River		
2012–2013	Gimnasia Jujuy	29	(0)
2013	Miramar Misiones	11	(0)
2014	Marathón	19	(1)
2014	Mitre	11	(0)
2015	Deportivo Quito	16	(3)
2015	Chacarita Juniors	17	(2)
2015–2018	The Strongest	63	(3)
2018	Peñarol	4	(0)
2018	Cobreloa	7	(0)
2019	Sport Huancayo	18	(0)
2020	Nueva Chicago	6	(0)
2020–	Rampla Juniors	3	(0)
- * Club domestic league appearances and goals as of 20:14, 27 August 2020 (UTC)

Luis Eduardo Maldonado (born March 26, 1985, in Montevideo) is a Uruguayan footballer currently playing for Rampla Juniors.
