= Jonathan Techera =

Uruguayan footballer (born 1989)

Jonathan Leonel Techera Saldaña (born November 20, 1989, in Montevideo) is a Uruguayan footballer who currently plays as a striker for Club Deportivo Marathon in Honduras, Central America.

== Teams ==
- (Uruguay) Defensor Sporting 2009
- (Uruguay) Cerro Largo 2010
- (Austria) Lustenau 2010
- (Uruguay) Sud América 2011–2013
- Club Deportivo Marathon 2013–present
