= Héctor Castellón =

Honduran footballer and manager (born 1960)

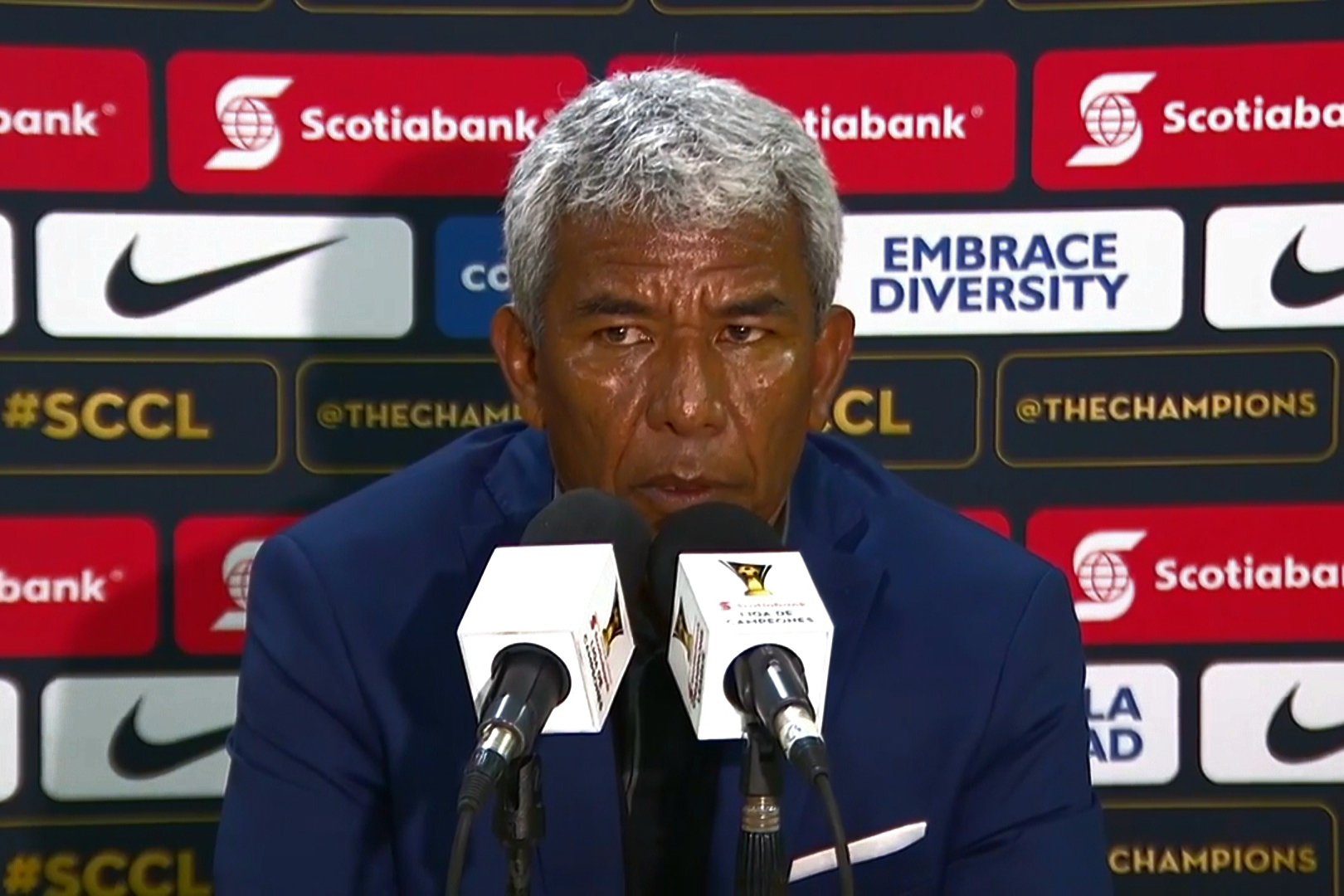

Personal information
- Full name: Héctor Ramón Castellón Fernández
- Date of birth: 31 August 1960 (age 66)
- Place of birth: Omoa, Honduras
- Height: 1.68 m (5 ft 6 in)
- Position: Midfielder

Senior career*
Years	Team	Apps	(Gls)
1976–1978	Olimpia		
1978	Universidad		
1979	→ Atlético Independiente (loan)		

Managerial career
- 1997–1999: Motagua (assistant)
- 1999: Motagua (interim)
- 2000–2001: Honduras (assistant)
- 2004–2005: Victoria
- 2005: Guatemala (assistant)
- 2012: Heredia
- 2013–2014: Real Sociedad
- 2014–2015: Marathón
- 2015–2017: Honduras Progreso
- 2017–2018: Vida
- 2018: Juticalpa
- 2019: Vida
- 2019: Platense
- 2020: Honduras Progreso
- * Club domestic league appearances and goals

Héctor Ramón Castellón Fernández (born 31 August 1960) is a Honduran former footballer and football manager.
