= Mariano Acevedo =

Honduran footballer (born 1983)

Personal information
- Full name: Mariano Elí Acevedo Fúnez
- Date of birth: January 9, 1983 (age 43)
- Place of birth: El Progreso, Honduras
- Height: 1.68 m (5 ft 6 in)
- Position: Midfielder

Senior career*
Years	Team	Apps	(Gls)
2005–2010	Marathón	170	(8)
2010	Deportes Concepción	2	(0)
2011–2013	Marathón	72	(9)
2013–2015	Olimpia	45	(2)
2015–2019	Honduras Progreso	106	(3)
Total		395	(22)

International career
2008–2011	Honduras	18	(0)
- * Club domestic league appearances and goals

Mariano Elí Acevedo Fúnez (born 9 January 1983) is a Honduran former footballer who played as a midfielder.

== Club career ==
Acevedo has played the large part of his career for Marathón, and is a midfielder. He has played for Marathón in the CONCACAF Champions League. In May 2013 he did not accept a pay cut by Marathón and was said to move to either Olimpia or Motagua.

== International career ==
Acevedo made his debut for Honduras in a February 2008 friendly match against Paraguay, coming on as a second-half substitute for Sergio Mendoza. He has, as of 1 August 2012, earned a total of 18 caps, scoring no goals. He has represented his country at the 2009, and 2011 UNCAF Nations Cups as well as at the 2009 CONCACAF Gold Cup.

== CONCACAF Champions League ==
Club	Season	Matches	Goals
CD Marathón	2008–2009	8	0
CD Marathón	2009–2010	7	0
CD Marathón	2010–2011	6	0

== Honours and awards ==
Honduras

- Copa Centroamericana (1): 2011
