= Elkin González =

Honduran footballer (born 1980)

Personal information
- Full name: Elkin Reynaldo González Donaire
- Date of birth: September 29, 1980 (age 46)
- Place of birth: La Libertad, Honduras
- Position: Midfielder

Team information
- Current team: Real Sociedad

Senior career*
Years	Team	Apps	(Gls)
2000–2010	Real España		
2010	Hispano		
2011	Deportivo Xinabajul		
2011	Real Sociedad		
2012	Parrillas One		
2012–present	Real Sociedad	51	(13)

International career^{‡}
2003–2006	Honduras	12	(0)
- * Club domestic league appearances and goals as of 2007 ‡ National team caps and goals as of May 20, 2008

Elkin Reynaldo González Donaire (born on September 29, 1980) is a Honduran football midfielder who currently plays for Real Sociedad in the Liga Nacional de Honduras.

== Club career ==
González played the majority of his career for Real España.

He joined Hispano in summer 2010 and moved to second division Parrillas One from Real Sociedad in January 2012, but in July 2012 he resigned for newly promoted Real Sociedad.

González and compatriot Edgar Nuñez were injured in a car accident when playing for Guatemalan side Deportivo Xinabajul in January 2011.

== International career ==
González made his debut for Honduras in an October 2003 friendly match against Bolivia and has earned a total of 12 caps, scoring no goals. He has represented his country at the 2005 UNCAF Nations Cup.

His final international was a February 2006 friendly against China.
