= Wilfredo Barahona =

Honduran footballer (born 1983)

Personal information
- Full name: Wilfredo Barahona Euceda
- Date of birth: 31 January 1983 (age 43)
- Place of birth: El Negrito, Honduras
- Position: Right back

Team information
- Current team: Real España

Youth career
- ????–2005: Olimpia

Senior career*
Years	Team	Apps	(Gls)
2005–2006	Broncos UNAH		
2006–2011	Olimpia		
2011–2012	Atlético Choloma	3	(0)
2012–present	Real España		

International career^{‡}
2006–	Honduras	7	(0)
- * Club domestic league appearances and goals as of 20 August 2011 (UTC) ‡ National team caps and goals as of 16 September 2014 (UTC)

Wilfredo "Will" Barahona Euceda (born 31 January 1983) is a Honduran footballer who used to play as an attacking or defending right back for Liga Nacional de Honduras club Real España.

== Career ==
=== Olimpia ===
Barahona have started playing in his football career with Olimpia. His discipline problems have made him to play in the reserves of the team several times. Even though he can get violent, nobody can deny his great skills when on the field.

On 30 December 2009, Barahona was involved in an incident with a referee, Levi López: in a friendly match against Hispano, when Levi López showed him a second yellow card and being sent off, he didn't like the decision and punched the referee on the upper lip. Eventually he received a 2-month game ban, which effectively make him end the first-leg of the Clausura.

=== Atlético Choloma ===
On 7 August 2011, Barahona made his domestic league debut against his previous team, Olimpia in a 2–0 defeat.

In August 2012, Barahona was sent off in one of his first games for new club Real España.

== International career ==
Barahona made his debut for Honduras in an August 2006 friendly match against Venezuela and earned his second and final cap in a September 2006 friendly against El Salvador. He was then called up to participate in the 2014 Copa Centroamericana earning his third cap.
