= Aly Arriola =

Honduran footballer (born 1987)

Personal information
- Full name: Christofer Aly Arriola Flores
- Date of birth: 22 November 1987 (age 38)
- Place of birth: Valle de Ángeles, Honduras
- Height: 1.78 m (5 ft 10 in)
- Position: Striker

Senior career*
Years	Team	Apps	(Gls)
2007–2011	Motagua	19	(1)
2011–2013	Deportes Savio		
2014–2015	Honduras Progreso		
2016	Lepaera		
2017	Municipal Limeño		
2017–2018	Lepaera		
2019–	Lobos UPNFM		
- * Club domestic league appearances and goals

Christofer Aly Arriola Flores (born 22 November 1987) is a Honduran professional footballer who plays as a striker.
