= Diego Reyes (footballer, born 1990) =

Honduran footballer

Personal information
- Full name: Diego Antonio Reyes Sandoval
- Date of birth: 11 January 1990 (age 36)
- Place of birth: Tocoa, Honduras
- Height: 1.85 m (6 ft 1 in)
- Position: Forward

Team information
- Current team: Real Sociedad
- Number: 7

Youth career
- 2008: Real Sociedad

Senior career*
Years	Team	Apps	(Gls)
2009–2010	Real Sociedad	0	(0)
2010–2011	Platense	2	(0)
2012–2014	Real Sociedad	39	(8)
2014–2016	Marathón	105	(33)
2017	AEL	4	(0)
2017	Real Sociedad	18	(6)
2018	Olimpia	26	(4)
2019–2020	Platense	46	(10)
2020–2023	Olimpia	41	(6)
2023–	Real Sociedad	35	(8)

International career
2013–2017	Honduras	13	(2)
- * Club domestic league appearances and goals as of 13:01, 28 January 2024 (UTC)

Diego Antonio Reyes Sandoval (born 11 January 1990) is a Honduran professional footballer who plays as a forward for Liga de Nacional club C.D. Real Sociedad, is well known in Honduras for his pace, technique, and dribbling abilities.

== Club career ==
Diego Reyes began playing for C.D. Real Sociedad. His great performances at the club were congratulated. Then was transferred to C.D. Marathón.

== International career ==
Reyes made his senior debut for Honduras on the 24th of July 2013 in the semifinals for the 2013 CONCACAF Gold Cup against United States. He then played a friendly game on 5 March 2014 against Venezuela coming in as a substitute in the 63rd minute for Jerry Palacios. He is family with Andri Peraza (14 years old)

== Career statistics ==
Last update: 29 November 2020

Country	Team	Season	Apps	Goals
Honduras	Real Sociedad	2009–10	0	0
Honduras	Real Sociedad	Total	0	0
Honduras	Platense (loan)	2010–11	2	0
Honduras	Platense (loan)	Total	2	0
Honduras	Real Sociedad	2012–13	22	6
Honduras	Real Sociedad	2013–14	17	2
Honduras	Real Sociedad	Total	39	8
Honduras	Marathón	2013–14	24	8
Honduras	Marathón	2014–15	32	8
Honduras	Marathón	2015–16	34	11
Honduras	Marathón	2016–17	15	6
Honduras	Marathón	Total	105	33
Greece	AEL	2016–17	4	0
Greece	AEL	Total	4	0
Honduras	Real Sociedad	2017–18	18	6
Honduras	Real Sociedad	Total	18	6
Honduras	Olimpia	2017–18	11	3
Honduras	Olimpia	2018–19	15	1
Honduras	Olimpia	Total	26	4
Honduras	Platense	2018–19	18	3
Honduras	Platense	2019–20	28	7
Honduras	Platense	Total	46	10
Honduras	Olimpia	2020–21	10	2
Honduras	Olimpia	Total	10	2
Career total			250	63
