= Yul Arzú =

Honduran footballer (born 1986)

Personal information
- Full name: Yul Narcizo Arzú Casildo
- Date of birth: 21 October 1986 (age 40)
- Place of birth: San Pedro Sula, Honduras
- Position: Goalkeeper

Team information
- Current team: Atlético Choloma
- Number: 1

Youth career
- Real España

Senior career*
Years	Team	Apps	(Gls)
2005–2007	Real España	3	
2007–2009	Deportes Savio	36	(0)
2009–2011	Vida	24	(0)
2010–2012	Atlético Choloma		(0)
2012–	Vida		(0)
- * Club domestic league appearances and goals as of 11 September 2011

Yul Narcizo Arzú Casildo (born 21 October 1986) is a Honduran footballer who play as goalkeeper for Liga Nacional de Fútbol de Honduras club Vida.

== Career ==
Arzú started his career at Real España and also played for Deportes Savio and Vida before joining Second Division Choloma in summer 2010.

On August 29, 2014, it was announced that Arzú had been called up to play in the 2014 Central American Cup with Honduras.

=== Atlético Choloma ===
On the mid of 2010, Arzú moved to Atlético Choloma and made his debut in the Liga Nacional de Ascenso de Honduras 2010 Apertura, where he did a great performance as a goalkeeper. On 5 June 2011, Atlético Choloma beat Real Sociedad in penalty shoot-out, Arzú scored in the penalty shoot-out in the 2010–11 Clausura Final and Atlético Choloma emerged victorious 4–5 on penalties. On 18 June 2011, Atlético Choloma beat Parrillas One 1–0 in the 2nd leg of the 2010–11 Promotion, ascending for the first time to Liga Nacional de Honduras.

On 7 August 2011, Arzú made his domestic league debut against Olimpia in a 2–0 defeat.

In summer 2012, Arzú returned to Vida.
