= 2016–17 Honduran Liga Nacional =

Liga Nacional
- Season: 2016–17
- Champions: Apertura: Motagua (14th title); Clausura: Motagua (15th title)
- Relegated: Social Sol
- CONCACAF Champions League: Motagua
- CONCACAF League: Honduras Progreso; Platense; Olimpia
- Matches: 200
- Goals: 569 (2.85 per match)
- Top goalscorer: Martínez (22)
- Biggest home win: OLI 7–1 VID
- Biggest away win: VID 0–4 RES
- Highest scoring: HNP 3–5 PLA; OLI 7–1 VID; JUT 3–5 OLI
- Longest unbeaten run: Motagua (14)
- Longest losing run: Vida (8)
- All statistics correct as of 28 May 2017.

The 2016–17 Honduran Liga Nacional season was the 51st Honduran Liga Nacional edition since its establishment in 1965. For this season, the system format stayed the same as the previous season. The tournament began in July 2016 and ended in May 2017.

== 2016–17 teams ==
Location of teams in 2016–17 season

A total of 10 teams competed in the tournament, including 9 sides from the 2015–16 season plus C.D. Social Sol, promoted from the 2015–16 Liga de Ascenso.

Team	Location	Stadium	Capacity
Honduras Progreso	El Progreso	Estadio Humberto Micheletti	5,000
Juticalpa	Juticalpa	Estadio Juan Ramón Brevé Vargas	20,000
Marathón	San Pedro Sula	Estadio Yankel Rosenthal	15,000
Motagua	Tegucigalpa	Estadio Tiburcio Carías Andino	35,000
Olimpia	Tegucigalpa	Estadio Tiburcio Carías Andino	35,000
Platense	Puerto Cortés	Estadio Excélsior	7,910
Real España	San Pedro Sula	Estadio Francisco Morazán	26,781
Real Sociedad	Tocoa	Estadio Francisco Martínez Durón	3,000
Social Sol	Olanchito	Estadio San Jorge	3,000
Vida	La Ceiba	Estadio Nilmo Edwards	18,000

== Managerial changes ==
Team	Outgoing manager	Manner of departure	Vacancy	Replaced by	Appointment	Position in table
Platense	(Uruguay) Ariel Sena	Resigned	13 May 2016	(Honduras) Reynaldo Clavasquín	30 May 2016	Preseason
Real España	(Uruguay) Miguel Falero	Resigned	17 May 2016	(Honduras) Mauro Reyes	27 May 2016	Preseason
Real Sociedad	(Honduras) Mauro Reyes	Resigned	27 May 2016	(Costa Rica) Marvin Solano	3 June 2016	Preseason
Real Sociedad	(Costa Rica) Marvin Solano	Sacked	17 August 2016	(Honduras) Carlos Martínez	25 August 2016	8th
Social Sol	(Honduras) Carlos Caballero	Sacked	19 September 2016	(Colombia) Horacio Londoño	20 September 2016	10th
Social Sol	(Colombia) Horacio Londoño	Resigned	10 October 2016	(Honduras) Gustavo Gallegos	10 October 2016	10th
Juticalpa	(Honduras) Wilmer Cruz	Resigned	19 November 2016	(Honduras) Jorge Pineda	24 November 2016	8th
Marathón	(Honduras) Carlos Pavón	Sacked	12 December 2016	(Uruguay) Manuel Keosseián	12 December 2016	Mid season
Vida	(Honduras) Elvin López	Sacked	16 December 2016	(Honduras) Carlos Pavón	18 December 2016	Mid season
Real España	(Honduras) Mauro Reyes	Sacked	16 January 2017	(Honduras) Ramón Maradiaga	16 January 2017	3rd
Social Sol	(Honduras) Gustavo Gallegos	Sacked	20 February 2017	(Honduras) Airon Reyes	20 February 2017	9th
Vida	(Honduras) Carlos Pavón	Sacked	11 March 2017	(Honduras) Santiago Fúnez	16 March 2017	10th

== Apertura ==
The Apertura tournament is the first half of the 2016–17 season which was played from 29 July to 18 December 2016. The fixture was unveiled on 9 July. C.D. Social Sol made its official debut in Liga Nacional on 29 July when they lost 3–2 to Club Deportivo Olimpia at Estadio Tiburcio Carías Andino. C.D. Real Sociedad's Marvin Solano became the first manager to get sacked after only four weeks the season started. On week 10, C.D. Motagua and C.D. Honduras Progreso draw 0–0 in Catacamas; in such game, Melissa Borjas became the first female referee in Liga Nacional's history to enforce the laws in an official game. Motagua obtained its 14th national league after defeating Platense F.C. in an unprecedented final series.

=== Regular season ===
==== Standings ====
Pos	Team	Pld	W	D	L	GF	GA	GD	Pts	Qualification or relegation
1	Olimpia	18	12	3	3	35	21	+14	39	Qualification to the Semifinals
2	Platense	18	9	5	4	37	26	+11	32	Qualification to the Semifinals
3	Real España	18	9	4	5	31	22	+9	31	Qualification to the Second round
4	Motagua	18	7	7	4	30	24	+6	28	Qualification to the Second round
5	Marathón	18	6	6	6	22	22	0	24	Qualification to the Second round
6	Real Sociedad	18	6	6	6	23	24	−1	24	Qualification to the Second round
7	Honduras Progreso	18	7	3	8	23	31	−8	24	
8	Juticalpa	18	3	9	6	24	26	−2	18	
9	Vida	18	3	6	9	13	25	−12	15	
10	Social Sol	18	2	3	13	12	29	−17	9	

Updated to match(es) played on 19 November 2016. Source:

==== Results ====
As of 19 November 2016

Home \ Away	HNP	JUT	MAR	MOT	OLI	PLA	RES	RSO	SOC	VID
Honduras Progreso		1–1	1–2	0–2	2–0	3–5	3–1	4–1	1–0	1–0
Juticalpa	4–1		0–1	0–0	1–2	1–3	2–1	1–1	3–1	1–1
Marathón	2–2	2–2		3–1	2–0	3–3	0–0	0–0	2–0	0–1
Motagua	0–0	2–2	3–1		1–1	4–2	1–1	2–0	1–0	4–1
Olimpia	2–0	2–0	3–0	3–1		3–1	1–0	1–0	3–2	3–1
Platense	4–1	2–2	1–1	4–2	2–2		1–0	1–2	2–0	3–0
Real España	4–1	2–2	2–1	2–2	3–2	1–0		2–1	2–1	3–0
Real Sociedad	3–0	2–1	2–1	1–1	2–3	1–2	3–2		1–1	1–1
Social Sol	0–1	1–0	0–1	3–2	1–2	0–1	0–3	1–1		0–0
Vida	0–1	1–1	1–0	0–1	2–2	0–0	1–2	0–1	3–1	

Source: Soccerway
Legend: Blue = home team win; Yellow = draw; Red = away team win.

=== Postseason ===
==== Results ====
Playoffs
3	Real España	3	2	5
6	Real Sociedad	2	1	3
4	Motagua	2	1	3
5	Marathón	1	2	3

Semifinals
2	Platense	1	1	2
3	Real España	1	1	2
1	Olimpia	0	1	1
4	Motagua	1	1	2

Finals
2	Platense	0	1	1
4	Motagua	1	1	2

24 November 2016 Playoffs	Real Sociedad	2–3	Real España	Tocoa, Colón
14:00 CST	H. Martínez 52'; R. Martínez 58' Starting XI (GK) Reyes – 27; Paz – 2 Matute – 3 Colón – 4 R. Martínez – 11; Peña – 13; (substituted off) 36' Solórzano – 14; (substituted off) 89' Salgado – 15; Melgares – 17; Gutierres – 23; Arzú – 31; Substitutes; (substituted on) 36' H. Martínez – 16; (substituted on) 89' C. Martínez – 8 Coach; C. Martínez (HON)	Report	29' Zalazar; 57' 61' López Starting XI; 22 – L. López (GK); 2 – Chávez; 10 – Ursino (substituted off) 64'; 13 – Vargas; 14 – Altamirano (substituted off) 68'; 16 – Zalazar; 19 – I. López (substituted off) 78'; 20 – Arévalo; 23 – Delgado; 28 – Oseguera; 44 – Barahona; Substitutes; 7 – Borjas (substituted on) 64'; 9 – Arita (substituted on) 68'; 5 – Velásquez (substituted on) 78'; Coach (HON) Reyes	Stadium: Estadio Francisco Martínez Durón; Referee: Héctor Rodríguez

27 November 2016 Playoffs	Real España	2–1	Real Sociedad	San Pedro Sula, Cortés
16:00 CST	Cardozo 2'; Zalazar 40' Starting XI (GK) L. López – 22; Chávez – 2 (substituted off) 57' Acosta – 6 Vargas – 13; (substituted off) 79' Altamirano – 14; (substituted off) 56' Zalazar – 16; Arévalo – 20; Delgado – 23; Oseguera – 28; Cardozo – 35; Barahona – 44; Substitutes; (substituted on) 56' Ursino – 10; (substituted on) 57' I. López – 19; (substituted on) 79' Borjas – 7 Coach; Reyes (HON)	Report	42' Arzú Starting XI; 27 – Reyes (GK); 2 – Paz; 3 – Matute; 4 – Colón; 6 – Barralaga (substituted off) 67'; 11 – R. Martínez; 13 – Peña; 14 – Solórzano (substituted off) 59'; 15 – Salgado; 23 – Gutierres; 31 – Arzú; Substitutes; 16 – H. Martínez (substituted on) 59'; 17 – Melgares (substituted on) 67' Coach (HON) C. Martínez	Stadium: Estadio Francisco Morazán; Referee: Óscar Moncada

- Real España won 5–3 on aggregated.

23 November 2016 Playoffs	Marathón	1–2	Motagua	San Pedro Sula, Cortés
19:00 CST	Reyes 55' Starting XI; (substituted off) 9' (GK) Bodden – 1 Córdova – 3 Puerto – 6 Córdoba – 9 López – 12; Fuentes – 17; Reyes – 11; (substituted off) 70' Berríos – 19; Munive – 24; Mejía – 30; (substituted off) 46' Suazo – 43; Substitutes; (substituted on) 9' (GK) Torres – 25; (substituted on) 46' W. Martínez – 8 (substituted on) 70' E. Martínez – 7 Coach; Pavón (HON)	Report	4' Montes; 90+1' Crisanto Starting XI; 1 – Fonseca (GK); 2 – Montes; 3 – Figueroa; 6 – Mayorquín; 7 – Discua (substituted off) 75'; 9 – Castillo; 10 – Andino (substituted off) 61'; 16 – Castellanos; 23 – Pucheta; 27 – Crisanto; 31 – Bernárdez (substituted off) 66'; Substitutes; 5 – Pereira (substituted on) 61'; 24 – Elvir (substituted on) 66'; 11 – Vega (substituted on) 75'; Coach (ARG) Vásquez	Stadium: Estadio Francisco Morazán; Referee: Saíd Martínez

27 November 2016 Playoffs	Motagua	1–2	Marathón	Tegucigalpa, Francisco Morazán
16:00 CST	Castillo 90+8' (pen.) Starting XI (GK) Fonseca – 1 Montes – 2 Figueroa – 3 (substituted off) 75' Mayorquí – 6 Discua – 7 Castillo – 9 Castellanos – 16; (substituted off) 46' W. Crisanto – 18; Vergara – 22; F. Crisanto – 27; (substituted off) 46' Bernárdez – 31; Substitutes; (substituted on) 46' Pereira – 5 (substituted on) 46' Elvir – 24; (substituted on) 75' Flores – 8 Coach; Vásquez (ARG)	Report	45+3' Reyes; 88' Puerto Starting XI; 1 – Bodden (GK); 3 – Córdova; 9 – Córdoba (substituted off) 74'; 11 – Reyes; 12 – López; 17 – Fuentes; 19 – Berríos (substituted off) 64'; 20 – Vargas; 24 – Munive; 30 – Mejía; 46 – Suazo; Substitutes; 6 – Puerto (substituted on) 64'; 10 – Silva (substituted on) 74' Coach (HON) Pavón	Stadium: Estadio Tiburcio Carías Andino; Referee: Geovanny Mendoza

- Motagua 3–3 Marathón on aggregated; Motagua advanced on regular season performance.

1 December 2016 Semifinals	Motagua	1–0	Olimpia	Tegucigalpa, Francisco Morazán
19:30 CST	Andino 57' Starting XI (GK) Fonseca – 1 Montes – 2 Figueroa – 3 Pereira – 5 Discua – 7 Castillo – 9 (substituted off) 55' Vega – 11; Castellanos – 16; (substituted off) 75' Vergara – 22; Elvir – 24; (substituted off) 76' F. Crisanto – 27; Substitutes; (substituted on) 55' Andino – 10; (substituted on) 75' Mayorquín – 6 (substituted on) 76' W. Crisanto – 18; Coach; Vásquez (ARG)	Report	Starting XI; 28 – Escober (GK); 2 – Álvarez; 3 – Güity; 8 – Garrido; 12 – Johnson; 13 – Costly; 14 – Fonseca; 16 – Rodas (substituted off) 62'; 26 – Salas (substituted off) 78'; 31 – Quioto; 33 – Chirinos (substituted off) 72'; Substitutes; 10 – Méndez (substituted on) 62'; 7 – Mejía (substituted on) 72'; 19 – Tobías (substituted on) 78'; Coach (ARG) Vargas	Stadium: Estadio Tiburcio Carías Andino; Referee: Raúl Castro

4 December 2016 Semifinals	Olimpia	1–1	Motagua	Tegucigalpa, Francisco Morazán
16:00 CST	Estupiñán 45+2' Starting XI (GK) Valladares – 27; Álvarez – 2 Güity – 3 Garrido – 8 Fonseca – 14; Estupiñán – 18; (substituted off) 54' Tobías – 19; (substituted off) 65' Salas – 26; Quioto – 31; (substituted off) 61' Chirinos – 33; Oliva – 64; Substitutes; (substituted on) 54' Sánchez – (substituted on) 61' Costly – 13; (substituted on) 65' Rodas – 16; Coach; Vargas (ARG)	Report	31' Pereira Starting XI; 1 – Fonseca (GK); 2 – Montes (substituted off) 34'; 3 – Figueroa; 5 – Pereira; 7 – Discua; 9 – Castillo; 11 – Vega (substituted off) 57'; 16 – Castellanos; 18 – Crisanto; 22 – Vergara (substituted off) 49'; 24 – Elvir; Substitutes; 23 – Pucheta (substituted on) 34'; 6 – Mayorquín (substituted on) 49'; 10 – Andino (substituted on) 57'; Coach (ARG) Vásquez	Stadium: Estadio Tiburcio Carías Andino; Referee: Melvin Matamoros

- Motagua won 2–1 on aggregated.

1 December 2016 Semifinals	Real España	1–1	Platense	San Pedro Sula, Cortés
19:00 CST	Zalazar 54' Starting XI (GK) L. López – 22; Chávez – 2 Acosta – 6 (substituted off) 62' Ursino – 10; Vargas – 13; Altamirano – 14; Zalazar – 16; Delgado – 23; Oseguera – 28; (substituted off) 86' Benavídez – 38; Barahona – 44; Substitutes; (substituted on) 62' López – 19; (substituted on) 86' Cardozo – 35 Coach; Reyes (HON)	Report	7' Castillo Starting XI; 1 – Pineda (GK); 2 – Castro; 4 – Montes; 5 – Castillo; 6 – Palacios; 7 – Álvarez (substituted off) 46'; 9 – Lobo (substituted off) 66'; 11 – Hay; 14 – Reyes; 16 – Cardona (substituted off) 43'; 30 – Dixon; Substitutes; 23 – Andrade (substituted on) 43'; 12 – Vargas (substituted on) 46'; 17 – Norales (substituted on) 66'; Coach (HON) Clavasquín	Stadium: Estadio Francisco Morazán; Referee: Miguel Torres

4 December 2016 Semifinals	Platense	1–1	Real España	Puerto Cortés, Cortés
15:00 CST	Dixon 6' Starting XI (GK) Calderón – 29; Castro – 2 Montes – 4 Castillo – 5 (substituted off) 71' Álvarez – 7 (substituted off) 47' Hay – 11; Reyes – 14; (substituted off) 62' Cardona – 16; Norales – 17; Mendoza – 25; Dixon – 30; Substitutes; (substituted on) 47' Lobo – 9 (substituted on) 62' Andrade – 23; (substituted on) 71' Palacios – 6 Coach; Clavasquín (HON)	Report	62' Delgado Starting XI; 22 – L. López (GK); 2 – Chávez; 6 – Acosta; 13 – Vargas; 14 – Altamirano; 16 – Zalazar; 23 – Delgado; 28 – Oseguera; 35 – Cardozo (substituted off) 67'; 38 – Benavídez (substituted off) 69'; 44 – Barahona (substituted off) 63'; Substitutes; 10 – Ursino (substituted on) 63'; 4 – Róchez (substituted on) 67'; 19 – I. López (substituted on) 69'; Coach (HON) Reyes	Stadium: Estadio Excélsior; Referee: Saíd Martínez

- Platense 2–2 Real España on aggregated; Platense advanced on regular season performance.

11 December 2016 Final	Motagua	1–0	Platense	Tegucigalpa, Francisco Morazán
16:00 CST	Vergara 45+3' Starting XI; (substituted off) 72' (GK) Fonseca – 1 Figueroa – 3 Pereira – 5 Discua – 7 Castillo – 9 Andino – 10; Castellanos – 16; (substituted off) 58' W. Crisanto – 18; Vergara – 22; (substituted off) 64' Pucheta – 23; Elvir – 24; Substitutes; (substituted on) 58' F. Crisanto – 27; (substituted on) 64' Mayorquín – 6 (substituted on) 72' Licona – 25; Coach; Vásquez (ARG)	Report	Starting XI; 29 – Calderón (GK); 2 – Castro; 4 – Montes; 5 – Castillo; 7 – Álvarez (substituted off) 23'; 9 – Lobo (substituted off) 45'; 14 – Reyes (substituted off) 78'; 16 – Cardona; 17 – Norales; 25 – Mendoza; 30 – Dixon; Substitutes; 8 – Franco (substituted on) 23'; 23 – Andrade (substituted on) 45'; 12 – Vargas (substituted on) 78'; Coach (HON) Clavasquín	Stadium: Estadio Tiburcio Carías Andino; Attendance: 22,637; Referee: Raúl Castro

18 December 2016 Final	Platense	1–1	Motagua	Puerto Cortés, Cortés
15:00 CST	Cardona 45+1' Starting XI (GK) Calderón – 29; Castro – 2 (substituted off) 87' Montes – 4 Castillo – 5 Álvarez – 7 Hay – 11; (substituted off) 79' Núñez – 15; Cardona – 16; (substituted off) 53' Norales – 17; Mendoza – 25; Dixon – 30; Substitutes; (substituted on) 53' Ávila – 41; (substituted on) 79' Vargas – 12; (substituted on) 87' Franco – 8 Coach; Clavasquín (HON)	Report	60' Discua Starting XI; 25 – Licona (GK); 2 – Montes; 3 – Figueroa; 5 – Pereira; 6 – Mayorquín (substituted off) 46'; 7 – Discua (substituted off) 71'; 9 – Castillo; 16 – Castellanos; 22 – Vergara; 27 – F. Crisanto (substituted off) 58'; 31 – Bernárdez; Substitutes; 11 – Vega (substituted on) 46'; 18 – W. Crisanto (substituted on) 58'; 8 – Flores (substituted on) 71'; Coach (ARG) Vásquez	Stadium: Estadio Excélsior; Attendance: 9,033; Referee: Melvin Matamoros

- Motagua won 2–1 on aggregated.

== Clausura ==
The Clausura tournament is the second half of the 2016–17 season. The regular season fixtures were released on 10 December 2016. The first match of the tournament was played on 7 January at Estadio Francisco Morazán between Real C.D. España and C.D. Social Sol which ended in a scoreless tie. On 8 February, Club Deportivo Olimpia defeated C.D.S. Vida with a 7–1 score, a game in which striker Roger Rojas scored five goals, a record only shared with Arturo Garden, Jorge Arriola and Marlon Hernández. On week 7, Vida and Juticalpa F.C. draw 1–1 at Estadio Carlos Calderón, a venue used in Liga Nacional for the first time. On 22 April, Social Sol's player Francisco Reyes became the first ever goalkeeper to score two goals in a league match after converting two penalty kicks in the 2–1 victory over C.D. Marathón. On 28 May, C.D. Motagua obtained its 15th league title and their second in a row after defeating C.D. Honduras Progreso with a 7–1 aggregated score. In such game, 4 people were kill due to suffocation after a human stampede tried to push their way in to access the stadium which was already overcrowded.

=== Regular season ===
==== Standings ====
Pos	Team	Pld	W	D	L	GF	GA	GD	Pts	Qualification or relegation
1	Olimpia	18	11	4	3	47	26	+21	37	Qualification to the Semifinals
2	Motagua	18	9	7	2	35	21	+14	34	Qualification to the Semifinals
3	Real España	18	9	5	4	29	20	+9	32	Qualification to the Second round
4	Honduras Progreso	18	9	4	5	28	26	+2	31	Qualification to the Second round
5	Marathón	18	8	3	7	26	22	+4	27	Qualification to the Second round
6	Real Sociedad	18	7	5	6	26	22	+4	26	Qualification to the Second round
7	Platense	18	5	5	8	14	25	−11	20	
8	Social Sol	18	2	9	7	17	27	−10	15	
9	Juticalpa	18	2	5	11	23	37	−14	11	
10	Vida	18	2	5	11	15	34	−19	11	

Updated to match(es) played on 29 April 2017. Source:

==== Results ====
As of 29 April 2017

Home \ Away	HNP	JUT	MAR	MOT	OLI	PLA	RES	RSO	SOC	VID
Honduras Progreso		3–2	1–1	2–2	2–1	0–1	0–1	0–0	2–1	2–1
Juticalpa	3–4		0–1	0–0	3–5	3–1	0–3	2–1	2–2	1–1
Marathón	0–2	3–1		1–2	2–0	2–0	1–3	4–2	2–0	2–1
Motagua	3–1	3–2	2–0		1–1	4–0	1–1	3–1	4–0	2–0
Olimpia	5–2	3–2	3–2	2–2		3–0	3–1	3–0	3–1	7–1
Platense	0–1	3–1	0–2	2–1	2–2		2–1	1–1	2–1	0–0
Real España	2–1	2–0	1–1	2–2	1–3	1–0		2–1	0–0	3–1
Real Sociedad	1–2	1–0	2–1	4–0	2–0	0–0	3–0		3–3	2–0
Social Sol	1–1	0–0	2–1	2–2	0–1	0–0	1–1	0–0		2–1
Vida	1–2	1–1	0–0	0–1	2–2	2–0	0–4	1–2	2–1	

Source: Soccerway
Legend: Blue = home team win; Yellow = draw; Red = away team win.

=== Postseason ===
==== Results ====
Playoffs
3	Real España	1	4	5
6	Real Sociedad	2	1	3
4	Honduras Progreso	0	1	1
5	Marathón	1	0	1

Semifinals
2	Motagua	2	2	4
3	Real España	1	2	3
1	Olimpia	2	2	4
4	Honduras Progreso	4	2	6

Finals
2	Motagua	4	3	7
4	Honduras Progreso	1	0	1

3 May 2017 Playoffs	Real Sociedad	2–1	Real España	Tocoa, Colón
14:00 CST	Arzú 60'; Martínez 66' Starting XI (GK) Y. Arzú – 27; Paz – 2 Matute – 3 Caraballo – 4 R. Martínez – 11; Solórzano – 14; Salgado – 15; (substituted off) 52' Clark – 18; Osorio – 30; (substituted off) 83' P. Arzú – 31; (substituted off) 44' Mejía – 33; Substitutes; (substituted on) 44' C. Martínez – 8 (substituted on) 52' Meza – 12; (substituted on) 83' O. Martínez – 19; Coach; Medina (HON)	Report	40' Cardozo Starting XI; 1 – Hernández (GK); 6 – Acosta; 7 – Borjas; 11 – Tejeda (substituted off) 66'; 17 – Claros; 19 – López; 20 – Arévalo; 23 – Delgado (substituted off) 55'; 28 – Oseguera (substituted off) 79'; 35 – Cardozo; 44 – Barahona; Substitutes; 38 – Benavídez (substituted on) 55'; 10 – Ursino (substituted on) 66'; 54 – Romero (substituted on) 79'; Coach (HON) Maradiaga	Stadium: Estadio Francisco Martínez Durón; Referee: Héctor Rodríguez

6 May 2017 Playoffs	Real España	4–1	Real Sociedad	San Pedro Sula, Cortés
19:00 CST	Delgado 1'; Acosta 60'; Tejeda 82'; Barahona 90' Starting XI (GK) López – 22; (substituted off) 84' Acosta – 6 Ursino – 10; Vargas – 13; Claros – 17; López – 19; Arévalo – 20; Delgado – 23; (substituted off) 74' Cardozo – 35; Barahona – 44; Romero – 54; Substitutes; (substituted on) 74' Tejeda – 11; (substituted on) 84' Borjas – 7 Coach; Maradiaga (HON)	Report	80' Martínez Starting XI; 27 – Y. Arzú (GK); 2 – Paz; 3 – Matute; 4 – Caraballo (substituted off) 28'; 11 – R. Martínez; 13 – Peña; 14 – Solórzano (substituted off) 65'; 15 – Salgado; 18 – Clark; 30 – Osorio; 31 – P. Arzú (substituted off) 63'; Substitutes; 8 – C. Martínez (substituted on) 28'; 7 – Cárcamo (substituted on) 63'; 9 – J. Martínez (substituted on) 65'; Coach (HON) Medina	Stadium: Estadio Francisco Morazán; Referee: Melvin Matamoros

- Real España won 5–3 on aggregated.

3 May 2017 Playoffs	Marathón	1–0	Honduras Progreso	San Pedro Sula, Cortés
15:30 CST	Vargas 90+4' Starting XI (GK) Torres – 25; Córdova – 3 Fernandes – 4 Norales – 5 (substituted off) 80' Rodríguez – 7 Martínez – 8 (substituted off) 64' Barbosa – 9 López – 12; (substituted off) 78' Fuentes – 17; Berríos – 19; Arboleda – 27; Substitutes; (substituted on) 64' Argueta – 14; (substituted on) 78' Banegas – 16; (substituted on) 80' Vargas – 20; Coach; Keosseián (URU)	Report	Starting XI; 18 – Cárcamo (GK); 1 – P. Martínez; 6 – Delgado; 8 – Cardona; 10 – Morales (substituted off) 85'; 11 – Elvir (substituted off) 64'; 12 – Acevedo; 21 – Smith; 22 – Duarte; 31 – Sánchez; 38 – H. Martínez (substituted off) 57'; Substitutes; 13 – Britto (substituted on) 57'; 23 – Mencía (substituted on) 64'; 15 – López (substituted on) 85'; Coach (HON) Cruz	Stadium: Estadio Yankel Rosenthal; Referee: Óscar Moncada

6 May 2017 Playoffs	Honduras Progreso	1–0	Marathón	El Progreso, Yoro
19:15 CST	Britto 31' Starting XI (GK) Cárcamo – 18; Martínez – 1 Delgado – 6 Cardona – 8 (substituted off) 76' Morales – 10; (substituted off) 62' Elvir – 11; Acevedo – 12; Britto – 13; Smith – 21; Duarte – 22; Sánchez – 31; Substitutes; (substituted on) 62' Gómez – 16; (substituted on) 76' Mencía – 23; Coach; Cruz (HON)	Report	Starting XI; 1 – Bodden (GK); 2 – Bernárdez; 3 – Córdova; 4 – Fernandes; 5 – Norales; 7 – Rodríguez (substituted off) 68'; 8 – Martínez; 12 – López; 16 – Banegas; 17 – Fuentes; 27 – Arboleda; Substitutes; 14 – Argueta (substituted on) 68' Coach (URU) Keosseián	Stadium: Estadio Humberto Micheletti; Referee: Armando Castro

- Honduras Progreso 1–1 Marathón on aggregated; Honduras Progreso advanced on regular season performance.

11 May 2017 Semifinals	Honduras Progreso	4–2	Olimpia	El Progreso, Yoro
19:15 CST	Elvir 6' 58'; Cardona 43'; Sánchez 67' Starting XI (GK) Cárcamo – 18; Martínez – 1 Delgado – 6 Cardona – 8 Morales – 10; Elvir – 11; Acevedo – 12; Britto – 13; Smith – 21; Duarte – 22; Sánchez – 31; Substitutes Coach; Cruz (HON)	Report	2' 47' (pen.) Alvarado Starting XI; 28 – Escober (GK); 4 – de Souza; 6 – Alvarado; 8 – Garrido; 13 – Costly; 20 – López; 26 – Salas; 29 – Mejía; 30 – Palacios; 32 – García (substituted off) 61'; 33 – Chirinos; Substitutes; 24 – Flores (substituted on) 61'; Coach (ARG) Vargas	Stadium: Estadio Humberto Micheletti; Referee: Geovanny Mendoza

13 May 2017 Semifinals	Olimpia	2–2	Honduras Progreso	Tegucigalpa, Francisco Morazán
19:00 CST	Chirinos 16'; Alvarado 65' (pen.) Starting XI (GK) Escober – 18 de Souza – 4 Alvarado – 6 (substituted off) 86' Garrido – 8 Méndez – 10; Costly – 13; López – 20; (substituted off) 58' Rojas – 21; Mejía – 29; Palacios – 30; Chirinos – 33; Substitutes; (substituted on) 58' Estupiñán – 18; (substituted on) 86' Salas – 26 Coach; Vargas (ARG)	Report	45' Britto; 83' Mencía Starting XI; 18 – Cárcamo (GK); 1 – P. Martínez; 6 – Delgado; 8 – Cardona; 10 – Morales (substituted off) 59'; 11 – Elvir (substituted off) 74'; 13 – Britto (substituted off) 52'; 16 – Gómez; 21 – Smith; 22 – Duarte; 31 – Sánchez; Substitutes; 15 – López (substituted on) 52'; 38 – H. Martínez (substituted on) 59'; 23 – Mencía (substituted on) 74'; Coach (HON) Cruz	Stadium: Estadio Tiburcio Carías Andino; Referee: Orlando Hernández

- Honduras Progreso won 6–4 on aggregated.

11 May 2017 Semifinals	Real España	1–2	Motagua	San Pedro Sula, Cortés
19:00 CST	Cardozo 11' Starting XI (GK) López – 22; Acosta – 6 (substituted off) 60' Ursino – 10; Vargas – 13; Claros – 17; (substituted off) 80' López – 19; Arévalo – 20; (substituted off) 75' Delgado – 23; Cardozo – 35; Barahona – 44; Romero – 54; Substitutes; (substituted on) 60' Benavídez – 38; (substituted on) 75' Tejeda – 11; (substituted on) 80' Altamirano – 14; Coach; Maradiaga (HON)	Report	14' Discua; 87' López Starting XI; 19 – Rougier (GK); 2 – Montes; 3 – Figueroa; 5 – Pereira; 6 – Mayorquín; 7 – Discua; 10 – Andino (substituted off) 76'; 11 – Vega; 16 – Castellanos; 24 – Elvir; 27 – F. Crisanto (substituted off) 72'; Substitutes; 18 – W. Crisanto (substituted on) 72'; 34 – López (substituted on) 76' Coach (ARG) Vásquez	Stadium: Estadio Francisco Morazán; Referee: Nelson Salgado

14 May 2017 Semifinals	Motagua	2–2	Real España	Tegucigalpa, Francisco Morazán
16:00 CST	Mayorquín 80'; Elvir 88' Starting XI (GK) Rougier – 19; Montes – 2 Figueroa – 3 Pereira – 5 (substituted off) 85' Mayorquín – 6 Discua – 7 (substituted off) Andino – 10; Vega – 11; Castellanos – 16; Elvir – 24; (substituted off) 63' F. Crisanto – 27; Substitutes; (substituted on) 63' W. Crisanto – 18; (substituted on) López – 34; (substituted on) 85' Reyna – 14; Coach; Vásquez (ARG)	Report	17' Cardozo; 86' Tejeda Starting XI; 22 – L. López (GK); 6 – Acosta; 11 – Tejeda; 13 – Vargas; 17 – Claros (substituted off) 84'; 19 – I. López; 20 – Arévalo; 23 – Delgado (substituted off) 78'; 35 – Cardozo (substituted off) 82'; 44 – Barahona; 54 – Romero; Substitutes; 7 – Borjas (substituted on) 78'; 38 – Benavídez (substituted on) 82'; 9 – Arita (substituted on) 84'; Coach (HON) Maradiaga	Stadium: Estadio Tiburcio Carías Andino; Referee: Raúl Castro

- Motagua won 4–3 on aggregated.

20 May 2017 Final	Honduras Progreso	1–4	Motagua	El Progreso, Yoro
19:15 CST	Morales 24' Starting XI (GK) Cárcamo – 18; P. Martínez – 1 Delgado – 6 Cardona – 8 (substituted off) 68' Morales – 10; (substituted off) 61' Elvir – 11; (substituted off) 73' Britto – 13; Gómez – 16; Smith – 21; Duarte – 22; Sánchez – 31; Substitutes; (substituted on) 61' Mencía – 23; (substituted on) 68' H. Martínez – 38; (substituted on) 73' López – 15; Coach; Cruz (HON)	Report	31' 90+4' Vega; 63' Andino; 69' Discua Starting XI; 19 – Rougier (GK); 2 – Montes; 3 – Figueroa; 5 – Pereira; 6 – Mayorquín (substituted off) 75'; 7 – Discua; 10 – Andino (substituted off) 71'; 11 – Vega; 16 – Castellanos; 24 – Elvir; 27 – F. Crisanto (substituted off) 81'; Substitutes; 34 – López (substituted on) 71'; 14 – Reyna (substituted on) 75'; 18 – W. Crisanto (substituted on) 81'; Coach (ARG) Vásquez	Stadium: Estadio Humberto Micheletti; Referee: Óscar Moncada

28 May 2017 Final	Motagua	3–0	Honduras Progreso	Tegucigalpa, Francisco Morazán
16:00 CST	Andino 19' 49'; Discua 74' Starting XI (GK) Rougier – 19; Montes – 2 Figueroa – 3 Pereira – 5 Mayorquín – 6 Discua – 7 (substituted off) 73' Andino – 10; Vega – 11; Castellanos – 16; (substituted off) 78' Elvir – 24; (substituted off) 68' F. Crisanto – 27; Substitutes; (substituted on) 68' W. Crisanto – 18; (substituted on) 73' López – 34; (substituted on) 78' Bernárdez – 31; Coach; Vásquez (ARG)	Report	Starting XI; 18 – Cárcamo (GK); 1 – P. Martínez (substituted off) 9'; 6 – Delgado; 8 – Cardona (substituted off) 54'; 10 – Morales (substituted off) 54'; 11 – Elvir; 12 – Acevedo; 13 – Britto; 21 – Smith; 22 – Duarte; 31 – Sánchez; Substitutes; 7 – Alvarado (substituted on) 9'; 23 – Mencía (substituted on) 54'; 38 – H. Martínez (substituted on) 54'; Coach (HON) Cruz	Stadium: Estadio Tiburcio Carías Andino; Attendance: 30,000; Referee: Melvin Matamoros

- Motagua won 7–1 on aggregated.

== Top goalscorers ==
As of 28 May 2017

- 22 goals:

(Honduras) Rony Martínez (Real Sociedad)

- 20 goals:

(Honduras) Carlos Lanza (Juticalpa)

- 19 goals:

(Honduras) Carlo Costly (Olimpia)

- 18 goals:

(Honduras) Román Castillo (Motagua)

- 16 goals:

(Honduras) Ángel Tejeda (H. Progreso / Real España)

- 15 goals:

(Honduras) Erick Andino (Motagua)

- 13 goals:

(Argentina) Domingo Zalazar (Real España)
(Colombia) Javier Estupiñán (Olimpia)

- 12 goals:

(Uruguay) Claudio Cardozo (Real España)

- 11 goals:

(Panama) Brunet Hay (Platense)
(Honduras) Carlos Discua (Motagua)

- 10 goals:

(Honduras) Roby Norales (Platense)
(Honduras) Juan Rodríguez (Marathón)

- 9 goals:

(Honduras) Pablo Arzú (Real Sociedad)
(Honduras) Michaell Chirinos (Olimpia)
(Honduras) Alexander López (Olimpia)
(Honduras) Bryan Acosta (Real España)

- 8 goals:

(Colombia) Charles Córdoba (Marathón / Juticalpa)
(Honduras) Iván López (Real España)
(Honduras) Marco Vega (Motagua)

- 7 goals:

(Honduras) Romell Quioto (Olimpia)
(Honduras) Luis Lobo (Platense)
(Honduras) Walter Martínez (Marathón)
(Honduras) Wilmer Crisanto (Motagua)
(Honduras) Roger Rojas (Olimpia)
(Trinidad and Tobago) Jerrel Britto (Honduras Progreso)

- 6 goals:

(Honduras) Diego Reyes (Marathón)
Carlos Sánchez (Honduras Progreso)
(Colombia) Justin Arboleda (Marathón)

- 5 goals:

(Honduras) Bryan Róchez (Real España)
(Honduras) Henry Martínez (Real Sociedad)
(Honduras) Marlon Ramírez (Vida)
Pedro Mencía (Honduras Progreso)
(Honduras) Néstor Martínez (Platense / Social Sol)
(Honduras) Juan Ocampo (Juticalpa)
(Honduras) Edder Delgado (Real España)
(Honduras) César Guillén (Vida)
Frédixon Elvir (Honduras Progreso)
Jorge A. Cardona (Honduras Progreso)

- 4 goals:

(Honduras) Juan Montes (Motagua)
(Honduras) Óscar Salas (Olimpia)
(Honduras) Félix Crisanto (Motagua)
(Honduras) Alexander Aguilar (Juticalpa)
(Argentina) Santiago Vergara (Motagua)
(Costa Rica) Roy Smith (Honduras Progreso)

- 3 goals:

(Honduras) Esdras Padilla (Juticalpa)
(Uruguay) Carlos Ramírez (Social Sol)
(Honduras) Víctor Moncada (H. Progreso / Real España)
(Honduras) Jerry Palacios (Vida)
(Honduras) Osman Melgares (Real Sociedad)
(Honduras) Francisco Reyes (Social Sol)
(Honduras) Ever Alvarado (Olimpia)
(Honduras) Rony Flores (Juticalpa)
(Honduras) Jeancarlos Vargas (Platense)
(Honduras) Cholby Martínez (Vida)
(Argentina) Luciano Ursino (Real España)
(Honduras) Júnior Martínez (Real Sociedad)
(Honduras) Joshua Vargas (Marathón)
(Honduras) Reinieri Mayorquín (Motagua)
(Honduras) Édgar Álvarez (Platense)
(Honduras) Bayron Méndez (Olimpia)
(Panama) Richard Dixon (Platense)
(Argentina) Maximiliano Osurak (Platense)
(Honduras) José Arévalo (Real España)
(Colombia) Roberto Riascos (Social Sol)

- 2 goals:

(Honduras) Aldo Oviedo (Juticalpa)
(Honduras) Cristopher Urmeneta (Social Sol)
(Honduras) Carlos Mejía (Olimpia)
(Honduras) Brayan Velásquez (Vida)
(Honduras) Horacio Parham (Juticalpa)
(Honduras) Jonathan Paz (Real Sociedad)
(Honduras) Samuel Córdova (Marathón)
(Honduras) Edgar Martínez (Social Sol)
(Honduras) Dabirson Castillo (Platense)
(Honduras) Marcelo Pereira (Motagua)
Franklyn Morales (Honduras Progreso)
(Honduras) Kenrick Cárcamo (Real Sociedad)
(Honduras) John Suazo (Marathón)
Nixon Duarte (Honduras Progreso)
(Honduras) Jorge J. Cardona (Platense)
(Honduras) Hilder Colón (Real Sociedad / Juticalpa)
(Argentina) Walter García (Olimpia)
(Honduras) César Oseguera (Real España)
(Honduras) Raúl Santos (Vida)
(Honduras) Irvin Reyna (Motagua)
(Honduras) Omar Elvir (Motagua)
(Brazil) Israel Silva (Marathón)
(Honduras) Sergio Peña (Real Sociedad)
(Honduras) Jorge Bengoché (Olimpia)
Frelys López (Honduras Progreso)
(Honduras) Carlos Bernárdez (Vida)
(Honduras) Getsel Montes (Platense)
(Colombia) Luis López (Platense)
Pastor Martínez (Honduras Progreso)
(Honduras) Mario Martínez (Social Sol)
(Honduras) Kevin López (Motagua)

- 1 goal:

Leonardo Isaula (Honduras Progreso)
(Honduras) Osman Chávez (Real España)
(Honduras) Gerson Díaz (Social Sol)
(Honduras) José Fonseca (Olimpia)
(Honduras) Kevin Álvarez (Olimpia)
(Honduras) Henrry Clark (Real Sociedad)
Cristopher Anariba (Honduras Progreso)
(Honduras) Nissi Sauceda (Vida)
(Honduras) Elvin Casildo (Olimpia)
(Honduras) Mario Berríos (Marathón)
(Honduras) Jairo Puerto (Marathón)
(Honduras) Darvis Argueta (Marathón)
(Honduras) Efraín López (Social Sol)
(Honduras) Cristhian Altamirano (Real España)
(Uruguay) Richard Rodríguez (Vida)
(Argentina) Emiliano Forgione (Platense)
(Honduras) José Hernández (Juticalpa)
(Honduras) Carlos Solórzano (Real Sociedad)
Germy García (Honduras Progreso)
(Honduras) Juan Mejía (Juticalpa)
(Honduras) Douglas Martínez (Vida)
(Honduras) Bryan Johnson (Olimpia)
(Honduras) Leonardo Benedit (Social Sol)
Darwin Bermúdez (Honduras Progreso)
(Honduras) José García (Juticalpa)
(Honduras) Micher Antúnez (Social Sol)
(Honduras) Brayan Barrios (Marathón)
(Honduras) Mario Flores (Platense)
(Honduras) Óscar Medina (Platense)
(Honduras) Ian Osorio (Real Sociedad)
(Honduras) Gerson Rodas (Olimpia)
(Honduras) Víctor Berríos (Marathón)
(Honduras) Jhow Benavídez (Real España)
(Honduras) Davis Argueta (Marathón)
(Honduras) Héctor Castellanos (Motagua)
(Honduras) Shannon Welcome (Juticalpa)
(Honduras) José Canelas (Social Sol)
(Honduras) Wilfredo Barahona (Real España)
(Honduras) Romario Cavachuela (Social Sol)
(Honduras) Maylor Núñez (Platense)
(Honduras) Omar Salazar (Real España)
(Honduras) Hárlington Gutiérrez (Real Sociedad)
(Honduras) Allans Vargas (Real España)
(Honduras) Ángel Oseguera (Juticalpa)
(Honduras) Mario Ventura (Social Sol)
(Honduras) Elkin González (Real Sociedad)
Luis Alvarado (Honduras Progreso)
(Honduras) César García (Social Sol)
(Honduras) Elder Torres (Vida)
(Honduras) Henry Romero (Marathón)
Johny Rivera (Honduras Progreso)
(Honduras) Joshua Nieto (Platense)
(Honduras) Emere Robles (Social Sol)
(Uruguay) Ángel Barboza (Marathón)
Juan Delgado (Honduras Progreso)
(Honduras) Fabián Arriaga (Platense)

- 1 own goal:

Dilmer Gutiérrez (Honduras Progreso)
(Honduras) Júnior Izaguirre (Motagua)
(Honduras) Yul Arzú (Real Sociedad)

- 2 own goals:

(Honduras) Bryan Johnson (Olimpia / Vida)

== Aggregate table ==
Relegation is determined by the aggregated table of both Apertura and Clausura tournaments. The relegation was decided in the very last round as C.D. Social Sol draw 2–2 against C.D. Motagua and fall short two points behind C.D.S. Vida.

Pos	Team	Pld	W	D	L	GF	GA	GD	Pts	Qualification or relegation
1	Olimpia	36	23	7	6	82	47	+35	76	2017 CONCACAF League
2	Real España	36	18	9	9	60	42	+18	63	
3	Motagua	36	16	14	6	65	45	+20	62	2018 CONCACAF Champions League
4	Honduras Progreso	36	16	7	13	51	57	−6	55	2017 CONCACAF League
5	Platense	36	14	10	12	51	51	0	52	2017 CONCACAF League
6	Marathón	36	14	9	13	48	44	+4	51	
7	Real Sociedad	36	13	11	12	49	46	+3	50	
8	Juticalpa	36	5	14	17	47	63	−16	29	
9	Vida	36	5	11	20	28	59	−31	26	
10	Social Sol	36	4	12	20	29	56	−27	24	Relegation to the 2017–18 Liga de Ascenso

Updated to match(es) played on 29 April 2017. Source:

== Awards ==
The 2016–17 season awards were published on 17 November 2017 as follows:

- Best reserves coach: Francisco Pavón (C.D.S. Vida)
- Reserves MVP: Carlos Mejía (C.D.S. Vida)
- Reserves goalscorer: Darwin Arita (Platense F.C.)
- Rookie of the year: Jeancarlo Vargas (Platense F.C.)
- Top goalscorer: Rony Martínez (C.D. Real Sociedad)
- MVP: Carlos Discua (C.D. Motagua)
- Goalkeeper of the year: John Bodden (C.D. Marathón)
- Coach of the year: Diego Vásquez (C.D. Motagua)
- Referee of the year: Melvin Matamoros
