= 2018 CONCACAF League final =

- Event: 2018 CONCACAF League
Herediano	Motagua
(Costa Rica)	(Honduras)
3	2
- on aggregate

First leg
Herediano	Motagua
2	0
- Date: 25 October 2018
- Venue: Estadio Eladio Rosabal Cordero, Heredia
- Referee: Marco Ortíz (Mexico)

Second leg
Motagua	Herediano
2	1
- Date: 1 November 2018
- Venue: Estadio Tiburcio Carías Andino, Tegucigalpa
- Referee: Mario Escobar (Guatemala)

The 2018 CONCACAF League final was the final round of the 2018 CONCACAF League, the second edition of the CONCACAF League, the secondary club football tournament organised by CONCACAF, the regional governing body of North America, Central America, and the Caribbean.

The final was contested in two-legged home-and-away format between Herediano from Costa Rica and Motagua from Honduras. The first leg was hosted by Herediano at the Estadio Eladio Rosabal Cordero in Heredia on 25 October 2018, while the second leg was hosted by Motagua at the Estadio Tiburcio Carías Andino in Tegucigalpa on 1 November 2018.

Herediano won the final 3–2 on aggregate for their first CONCACAF League title.

== Teams ==
Team	Zone	Previous final appearances (bold indicates winners)
(Costa Rica) Herediano	Central America (UNCAF)	None
(Honduras) Motagua	Central America (UNCAF)	None

For the second consecutive season, the final of the CONCACAF League was competed between teams from Costa Rica and Honduras.

== Venues ==
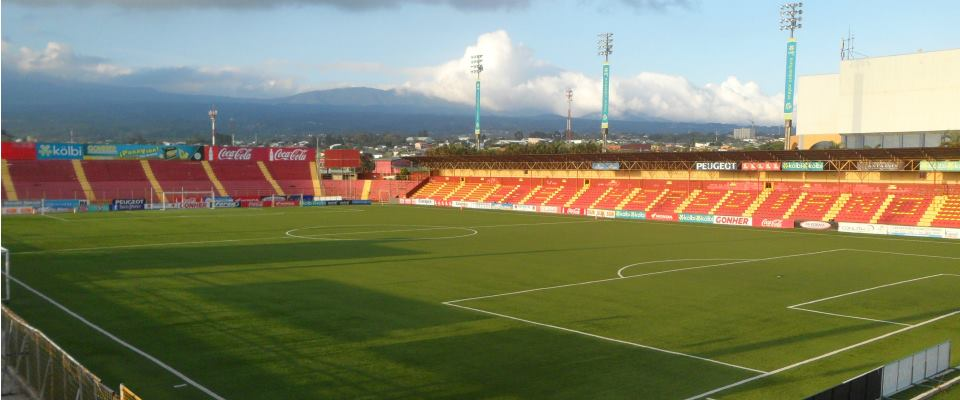
Estadio Eladio Rosabal Cordero in Heredia, Costa Rica, hosted the first leg.

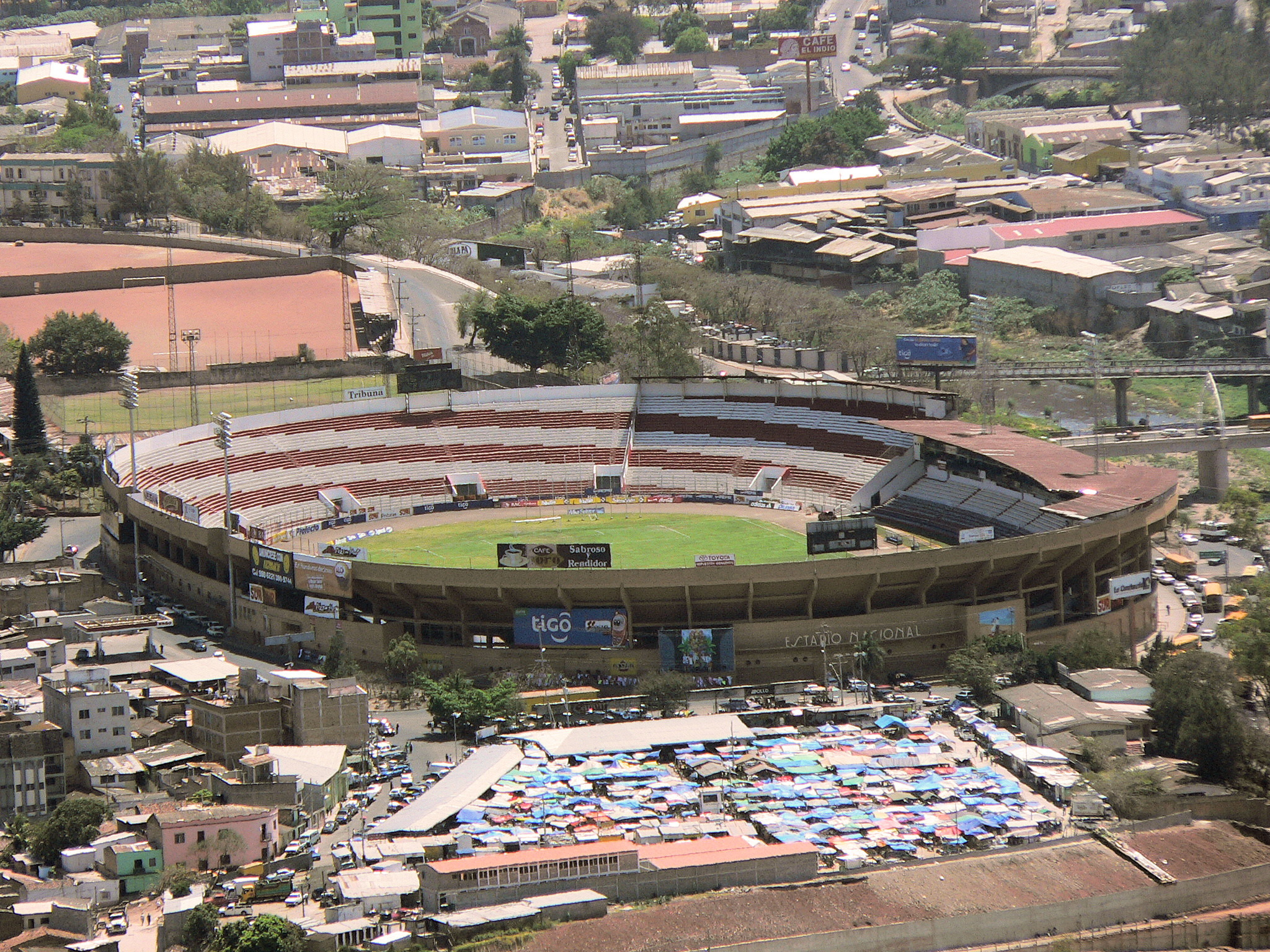
Estadio Tiburcio Carías Andino in Tegucigalpa, Honduras, hosted the second leg.

== Road to the final ==
Note: In all results below, the score of the finalist is given first (H: home; A: away).

(Costa Rica) Herediano				Round	(Honduras) Motagua			
Opponent	Agg.	1st leg	2nd leg	2018 CONCACAF League	Opponent	Agg.	1st leg	2nd leg
(El Salvador) Santa Tecla	2–2 (a)	1–0 (H)	1–2 (A)	Round of 16	(Belize) Belmopan Bandits	3–0	2–0 (H)	1–0 (A)
(Panama) Universitario	5–1	3–0 (H)	2–1 (A)	Quarter-finals	(Jamaica) Portmore United	5–2	3–2 (H)	2–0 (A)
(Panama) Árabe Unido	2–1	2–0 (H)	0–1 (A)	Semi-finals	(Panama) Tauro	3–2	1–2 (A)	2–0 (H)

== Format ==
The final was played on a home-and-away two-legged basis, with the team with the better performance in previous rounds hosting the second leg.

The away goals rule would not be applied, and extra time would be played if the aggregate score was tied after the second leg. If the aggregate score was still tied after extra time, the penalty shoot-out would be used to determine the winner (Regulations II, Article G).

=== Performance ranking ===
Pos	Team	Pld	W	D	L	GF	GA	GD	Pts	Host
1	(Honduras) Motagua	6	5	0	1	11	4	+7	**15**	2nd leg
2	(Costa Rica) Herediano	6	4	0	2	9	4	+5	**12**	1st leg

Source: CONCACAF
Rules for classification: 1) Points; 2) Goal difference; 3) Goals scored; 4) Away goals scored; 5) Wins; 6) Away wins; 7) Disciplinary points; 8) Drawing of lots (Regulations II, Article H).

== Matches ==
=== First leg ===
25 October 2018
20:00 UTC−6

Herediano (Costa Rica)	2–0	(Honduras) Motagua
Marín 23'; Cruz 62'	Report

Estadio Eladio Rosabal Cordero, Heredia
Referee: Marco Ortíz (Mexico)

**Herediano**	**Motagua**

GK	1	(Costa Rica) Leonel Moreira
RB	99	(Costa Rica) Keyner Brown
CB	37	(Costa Rica) Keysher Fuller		(substituted off) 46'
CB	26	(Costa Rica) Leonardo González	(yellow card) 76'
LB	21	(Costa Rica) Pablo Salazar (c)	(yellow card) 48'
CM	8	(Costa Rica) Allan Cruz
CM	11	(Costa Rica) Jimmy Marín
CM	12	(Costa Rica) Randall Azofeifa
RF	77	(Costa Rica) José Ortiz		(substituted off) 70'
CF	7	(Costa Rica) Yendrick Ruiz
LF	14	(Costa Rica) Berny Burke		(substituted off) 58'
Substitutes:
GK	20	(Costa Rica) Daniel Cambronero
DF	42	(Costa Rica) Heyreel Saravia		(substituted on) 46'
MF	5	(Costa Rica) Óscar Granados		(substituted on) 58'
MF	23	(Mexico) Édgar Lugo
MF	27	(Costa Rica) Alberth Villalobos		(substituted on) 70'
FW	3	(England) Antonio Pedroza
FW	17	(Mexico) Aldo Magaña
Manager:
(Costa Rica) Jafet Soto (Note: Herediano manager Jafet Soto was expelled by the referee in the 37th minute. Assistant manager and compatriot Rolando Villalobos filled in as manager for the remainder of the match.)

GK	19	(Argentina) Jonathan Rougier
RB	2	(Honduras) Juan Montes (c)
CB	3	(Honduras) Henry Figueroa	(yellow card) 71'
CB	17	(Honduras) Denil Maldonado	(yellow card) 61'
LB	24	(Honduras) Omar Elvir
CM	10	(Argentina) Matías Galvaliz		(substituted off) 58'
CM	16	(Honduras) Héctor Castellanos
CM	21	(Paraguay) Roberto Moreira	(yellow card) 68'	(substituted off) 77'
RW	6	(Honduras) Reinieri Mayorquín		(substituted off) 78'
LW	34	(Honduras) Kevin López	(yellow card) 32'
CF	9	(Honduras) Román Castillo
Substitutes:
GK	25	(Honduras) Marlon Licona
DF	5	(Honduras) Marcelo Pereira
DF	18	(Honduras) Wilmer Crisanto
DF	31	(Honduras) Carlos Sánchez
MF	8	(Honduras) Walter Martínez		(substituted on) 58'
MF	12	(Honduras) Marcelo Santos		(substituted on) 78'
FW	22	(Colombia) Javier Estupiñán		(substituted on) 77'
Manager:
(Argentina) Diego Vásquez

Assistant referees:
José Luís Camargo (Mexico)
Marvin Torrentera (Mexico)
Fourth official:
Fernando Guerrero (Mexico)

**Match rules**

- 90 minutes.
- Seven named substitutes, of which up to three may be used.

=== Second leg ===
1 November 2018
20:00 UTC−6

Motagua (Honduras)	2–1	(Costa Rica) Herediano
Castillo 45+1', 58'	Report	Marín 85'

Estadio Tiburcio Carías Andino, Tegucigalpa
Referee: Mario Escobar (Guatemala)

**Motagua**	**Herediano**

GK	19	(Argentina) Jonathan Rougier
RB	17	(Honduras) Denil Maldonado		(substituted off) 86'
CB	3	(Honduras) Henry Figueroa
CB	2	(Honduras) Juan Montes (c)	(yellow card) 72'
LB	24	(Honduras) Omar Elvir
CM	10	(Argentina) Matías Galvaliz
CM	12	(Honduras) Marcelo Santos
CM	21	(Paraguay) Roberto Moreira		(substituted off) 74'
RW	6	(Honduras) Reinieri Mayorquín	(yellow card) 51'	(substituted off) 54'
LW	34	(Honduras) Kevin López
CF	9	(Honduras) Román Castillo
Substitutes:
GK	25	(Honduras) Marlon Licona
DF	4	(Honduras) Sergio Peña
DF	5	(Honduras) Marcelo Pereira
DF	18	(Honduras) Wilmer Crisanto		(substituted on) 86'
DF	31	(Honduras) Carlos Sánchez
MF	8	(Honduras) Walter Martínez		(substituted on) 54'
FW	22	(Colombia) Javier Estupiñán		(substituted on) 74'
Manager:
(Argentina) Diego Vásquez

GK	1	(Costa Rica) Leonel Moreira
RB	42	(Costa Rica) Heyreel Saravia
CB	99	(Costa Rica) Keyner Brown
CB	21	(Costa Rica) Pablo Salazar (c)
LB	26	(Costa Rica) Leonardo González
CM	8	(Costa Rica) Allan Cruz	(yellow card) 89'
CM	11	(Costa Rica) Jimmy Marín
CM	5	(Costa Rica) Óscar Granados
RF	77	(Costa Rica) José Ortiz	(yellow card) 88'	(substituted off) 88'
CF	7	(Costa Rica) Yendrick Ruiz	(yellow card) 90'	(substituted off) 90'
LF	9	(Mexico) Omar Arellano		(substituted off) 69'
Substitutes:
GK	20	(Costa Rica) Daniel Cambronero
DF	53	(Costa Rica) Christian Reyes		(substituted on) 90'
MF	16	(Costa Rica) Youstin Salas		(substituted on) 88'
MF	23	(Mexico) Édgar Lugo
MF	27	(Costa Rica) Alberth Villalobos		(substituted on) 69'
FW	3	(England) Antonio Pedroza
FW	17	(Mexico) Aldo Magaña
Manager:
(Costa Rica) Rolando Villalobos (Note: Herediano manager Jafet Soto was given a two-match touchline ban in CONCACAF competitions following the first leg of the final. Assistant manager and compatriot Rolando Villalobos filled in as manager.)

Assistant referees:
Juan Zumba (El Salvador)
Ronald Bruna (Panama)
Fourth official:
John Pitti (Panama)

**Match rules**

- 90 minutes.
- 30 minutes of extra time if tied on aggregate (no away goals rule applied).
- Penalty shoot-out if still tied after extra time.
- Seven named substitutes, of which up to three may be used, with a fourth allowed in extra time.

== See also ==
- 2019 CONCACAF Champions League
