= 2019 CONCACAF Gold Cup Group C =

Football tournament group stage

Group C of the 2019 CONCACAF Gold Cup took place from 17 to 25 June 2019. The group consisted of Curaçao, El Salvador, Honduras, and co-hosts Jamaica. The top two teams, Jamaica and Curaçao, advanced to the knockout stage.

== Teams ==
Draw position	Team	Zone	Method of qualification	Date of qualification	Finals appearance	Last appearance	Previous best performance	CONCACAF Rankings		FIFA Rankings June 2019
Draw position	Team	Zone	Method of qualification	Date of qualification	Finals appearance	Last appearance	Previous best performance	September 2018 (Note: The CONCACAF rankings of September 2018 were used to determine the four seeded teams of the group stage.)	June 2019	FIFA Rankings June 2019
C1 (seed)	Honduras	UNCAF	Hex 4th place	7 March 2018	14th	2017	Runners-up (1991)	4	4	61
C2	Jamaica (co-hosts)	CFU	CNLQ 8th place	23 March 2019	11th	2017	Runners-up (2015, 2017)	6	7	54
C3	El Salvador	UNCAF	CNLQ 10th place	24 March 2019	11th	2017	Quarter-finals (2002, 2003, 2011, 2013, 2017)	9	9	69
C4	Curaçao	CFU	CNLQ 4th place	23 March 2019	2nd	2017	Group stage (2017)	16	15	79

== Standings ==
Pos	Team	Pld	W	D	L	GF	GA	GD	Pts	Qualification
1	Jamaica (H)	3	1	2	0	4	3	+1	5	Advance to knockout stage
2	Curaçao	3	1	1	1	2	2	0	4	Advance to knockout stage
3	El Salvador	3	1	1	1	1	4	−3	4	
4	Honduras	3	1	0	2	6	4	+2	3	

Source: CONCACAF
Rules for classification: Tiebreakers
(H) Hosts

In the quarter-finals:

- The winners of Group C, Jamaica, advanced to play the runners-up of Group D, Panama.
- The runners-up of Group C, Curaçao, advanced to play the winners of Group D, the United States.

== Matches ==
=== Curaçao vs El Salvador ===
17 June 2019
19:00 (18:00 UTC−5)

Curaçao	0–1	El Salvador
	Report	Bonilla 45+2'

Independence Park, Kingston
Attendance: 17,874
Referee: Walter López (Guatemala)

Curaçao	El Salvador

GK	1	Eloy Room
RB	2	Cuco Martina (c)
CB	4	Darryl Lachman
CB	5	Jurich Carolina	(yellow card) 1'	(substituted off) 84'
LB	13	Juriën Gaari
CM	6	Michaël Maria		(substituted off) 58'
CM	10	Leandro Bacuna
CM	15	Shermaine Martina	(yellow card) 61'	(substituted off) 66'
RF	18	Elson Hooi
CF	9	Charlison Benschop
LF	11	Gevaro Nepomuceno
Substitutions:
FW	16	Gino van Kessel	(yellow card) 71'	(substituted on) 58'
MF	21	Ayrton Statie		(substituted on) 66'
FW	19	Jafar Arias		(substituted on) 84'
Manager:
Remko Bicentini

GK	1	Henry Hernández (c)
RB	21	Bryan Tamacas
CB	3	Roberto Domínguez
CB	4	Iván Mancía
LB	15	Jonathan Jiménez		(substituted off) 86'
DM	6	Narciso Orellana
RM	7	Darwin Cerén
LM	14	Andrés Flores		(substituted off) 82'
RW	16	Óscar Cerén
LW	10	Jaime Alas		(substituted off) 76'
CF	9	Nelson Bonilla	(yellow card) 20'
Substitutions:
FW	11	Juan Carlos Portillo		(substituted on) 76'
MF	12	Marvin Monterrosa		(substituted on) 82'
DF	20	Rubén Marroquín		(substituted on) 86'
Manager:
(Mexico) Carlos de los Cobos

Man of the Match:
Nelson Bonilla (El Salvador)

Assistant referees:
Gerson López (Guatemala)
Juan Carlos Mora (Costa Rica)
Fourth official:
Reon Radix (Grenada)

=== Jamaica vs Honduras ===
17 June 2019
21:30 (20:30 UTC−5)

Jamaica	3–2	Honduras
Orgill 15', 41'; Lowe 56'	Report	Lozano 54'; Castillo 90+2'

Independence Park, Kingston
Attendance: 17,874
Referee: Jair Marrufo (United States)

Jamaica	Honduras

GK	1	Andre Blake (c)
RB	5	Alvas Powell
CB	17	Damion Lowe
CB	14	Shaun Francis
LB	20	Kemar Lawrence
CM	22	Devon Williams
CM	3	Michael Hector	(substituted off) 68'
CM	6	Dever Orgill	(substituted off) 68'
RF	16	Peter-Lee Vassell	(substituted off) 77'
CF	7	Leon Bailey
LF	18	Brian Brown
Substitutions:
MF	4	Andre Lewis	(substituted on) 68'
FW	11	Shamar Nicholson	(substituted on) 68'
FW	12	Junior Flemmings	(substituted on) 77'
Manager:
Theodore Whitmore

GK	1	Luis López
RB	21	Brayan Beckeles
CB	4	Henry Figueroa
CB	3	Maynor Figueroa (c)
LB	7	Emilio Izaguirre
RM	17	Alberth Elis	(yellow card) 90+5'
CM	19	Luis Garrido		(substituted off) 75'
CM	16	Héctor Castellanos
LM	10	Alexander López		(substituted off) 73'
CF	9	Anthony Lozano
CF	12	Romell Quioto		(substituted off) 57'
Substitutions:
MF	14	Michaell Chirinos		(substituted on) 57'
FW	11	Rubilio Castillo		(substituted on) 73'
MF	6	Bryan Acosta		(substituted on) 75'
Manager:
(Uruguay) Fabián Coito

Man of the Match:
Dever Orgill (Jamaica)

Assistant referees:
Frank Anderson (United States)
Ian Anderson (United States)
Fourth official:
José Torres (Puerto Rico)

=== El Salvador vs Jamaica ===
21 June 2019
19:00 (18:00 UTC−5)

El Salvador	0–0	Jamaica
	Report

BBVA Stadium, Houston
Attendance: 22,395
Referee: John Pitti (Panama)

El Salvador	Jamaica

GK	1	Henry Hernández (c)
RB	21	Bryan Tamacas
CB	4	Iván Mancía
CB	3	Roberto Domínguez	(yellow card) 10'
LB	15	Jonathan Jiménez	(yellow card) 90'
CM	14	Andrés Flores		(substituted off) 46'
CM	6	Narciso Orellana		(substituted off) 83'
CM	7	Darwin Cerén	(yellow card) 42'
RF	16	Óscar Cerén
CF	9	Nelson Bonilla
LF	11	Juan Carlos Portillo		(substituted off) 67'
Substitutions:
MF	19	Gerson Mayen		(substituted on) 46'
MF	10	Jaime Alas		(substituted on) 67'
MF	12	Marvin Monterrosa		(substituted on) 83'
Manager:
(Mexico) Carlos de los Cobos

GK	1	Andre Blake (c)
RB	5	Alvas Powell
CB	14	Shaun Francis
CB	17	Damion Lowe	(yellow card) 85'
LB	20	Kemar Lawrence
CM	12	Junior Flemmings	(yellow card) 60'	(substituted off) 85'
CM	3	Michael Hector
CM	4	Andre Lewis
RF	7	Leon Bailey
CF	6	Dever Orgill	(yellow card) 48'	(substituted off) 66'
LF	18	Brian Brown		(substituted off) 66'
Substitutions:
FW	10	Darren Mattocks		(substituted on) 66'
FW	11	Shamar Nicholson		(substituted on) 66'
MF	9	Ricardo Morris		(substituted on) 85'
Manager:
Theodore Whitmore

Man of the Match:
Roberto Domínguez (El Salvador)

Assistant referees:
Gerson López (Guatemala)
Henri Pupiro (Nicaragua)
Fourth official:
Diego Montaño (Mexico)

=== Honduras vs Curaçao ===
21 June 2019
21:30 (20:30 UTC−5)

Honduras	0–1	Curaçao
	Report	Bacuna 40'

BBVA Stadium, Houston
Attendance: 22,395
Referee: Juan Gabriel Calderón (Costa Rica)

Honduras	Curaçao

GK	1	Luis López
RB	7	Emilio Izaguirre
CB	21	Brayan Beckeles	(substituted off) 46'
CB	3	Maynor Figueroa (c)
LB	4	Henry Figueroa
RM	10	Alexander López	(substituted off) 46'
CM	20	Jorge Álvarez
CM	14	Michaell Chirinos	(substituted off) 76'
LM	19	Luis Garrido
CF	9	Anthony Lozano
CF	17	Alberth Elis
Substitutions:
FW	11	Rubilio Castillo	(substituted on) 46'
MF	6	Bryan Acosta	(substituted on) 46'
MF	8	José Reyes	(substituted on) 76'
Manager:
(Uruguay) Fabián Coito

GK	1	Eloy Room
RB	13	Juriën Gaari
CB	2	Cuco Martina (c)
CB	4	Darryl Lachman
LB	21	Ayrton Statie
CM	10	Leandro Bacuna	(substituted off) 85'
CM	18	Elson Hooi
CM	6	Michaël Maria
RF	11	Gevaro Nepomuceno	(substituted off) 69'
CF	19	Jafar Arias	(substituted off) 79'
LF	7	Jarchinio Antonia
Substitutions:
MF	15	Shermaine Martina	(substituted on) 69'
FW	16	Gino van Kessel	(substituted on) 79'
MF	12	Shanon Carmelia	(substituted on) 85'
Manager:
Remko Bicentini

Man of the Match:
Eloy Room (Curaçao)

Assistant referees:
Juan Carlos Mora (Costa Rica)
Corey Parker (United States)
Fourth official:
Keylor Herrera (Costa Rica)

=== Jamaica vs Curaçao ===
25 June 2019
20:00 (17:00 UTC−7)

Jamaica	1–1	Curaçao
Nicholson 14'	Report	Gaari 90+3'

Banc of California Stadium, Los Angeles
Attendance: 22,503
Referee: Marco Ortíz (Mexico)

Jamaica	Curaçao

GK	1	Andre Blake (c)
RB	5	Alvas Powell
CB	14	Shaun Francis
CB	17	Damion Lowe	(substituted off) 70'
LB	20	Kemar Lawrence
RM	22	Devon Williams	(substituted off) 87'
CM	4	Andre Lewis	(substituted off) 73'
CM	9	Ricardo Morris
LM	15	Je-Vaughn Watson
CF	12	Junior Flemmings
CF	11	Shamar Nicholson
Substitutions:
DF	3	Michael Hector	(substituted on) 70'
DF	21	Kevon Lambert	(substituted on) 73'
MF	19	Tyreek Magee	(substituted on) 87'
Manager:
Theodore Whitmore

GK	1	Eloy Room
RB	13	Juriën Gaari
CB	2	Cuco Martina (c)
CB	4	Darryl Lachman
LB	21	Ayrton Statie		(substituted off) 76'
CM	10	Leandro Bacuna
CM	18	Elson Hooi
CM	6	Michaël Maria		(substituted off) 62'
RF	11	Gevaro Nepomuceno
CF	19	Jafar Arias
LF	7	Jarchinio Antonia	(yellow card) 68'	(substituted off) 70'
Substitutions:
MF	15	Shermaine Martina		(substituted on) 62'
FW	14	Kenji Gorré		(substituted on) 70'
FW	16	Gino van Kessel		(substituted on) 76'
Manager:
Remko Bicentini

Man of the Match:
Shamar Nicholson (Jamaica)

Assistant referees:
Juan Carlos Mora (Costa Rica)
Corey Parker (United States)
Fourth official:
Keylor Herrera (Costa Rica)

=== Honduras vs El Salvador ===
25 June 2019
22:30 (19:30 UTC−7)

Honduras	4–0	El Salvador
Álvarez 59'; Castillo 65'; Acosta 75'; Izaguirre 90'	Report

Banc of California Stadium, Los Angeles
Attendance: 22,503
Referee: Fernando Guerrero (Mexico)

Honduras	El Salvador

GK	1	Luis López
RB	2	Félix Crisanto
CB	4	Henry Figueroa	(yellow card) 73'
CB	3	Maynor Figueroa (c)
LB	5	Ever Alvarado
CM	20	Jorge Álvarez
CM	19	Luis Garrido
CM	6	Bryan Acosta		(substituted off) 79'
RF	17	Alberth Elis
CF	11	Rubilio Castillo		(substituted off) 89'
LF	14	Michaell Chirinos		(substituted off) 75'
Substitutions:
FW	12	Romell Quioto		(substituted on) 75'
MF	16	Héctor Castellanos		(substituted on) 79'
DF	7	Emilio Izaguirre		(substituted on) 89'
Manager:
(Uruguay) Fabián Coito

GK	1	Henry Hernández (c)
RB	21	Bryan Tamacas	(yellow card) 90+4'
CB	4	Iván Mancía
CB	3	Roberto Domínguez
LB	15	Jonathan Jiménez
CM	12	Marvin Monterrosa		(substituted off) 76'
CM	7	Darwin Cerén
CM	6	Narciso Orellana		(substituted off) 64'
RF	16	Óscar Cerén		(substituted off) 60'
CF	9	Nelson Bonilla
LF	11	Juan Carlos Portillo
Substitutions:
MF	13	Santos Ortíz		(substituted on) 60'
MF	19	Gerson Mayen		(substituted on) 64'
FW	8	David Rugamas		(substituted on) 76'
Manager:
(Mexico) Carlos de los Cobos

Man of the Match:
Rubilio Castillo (Honduras)

Assistant referees:
Miguel Hernández (Mexico)
Alberto Morín (Mexico)
Fourth official:
Mario Escobar (Guatemala)

== Discipline ==
Fair play points would have been used as tiebreakers if the overall and head-to-head records of teams were tied. These were calculated based on yellow and red cards received in all group matches as follows:

- first yellow card: minus 1 point;
- indirect red card (second yellow card): minus 3 points;
- direct red card: minus 4 points;
- yellow card and direct red card: minus 5 points;

Only one of the above deductions were applied to a player in a single match.

Team	Match 1				Match 2				Match 3				Points
Team	Booked	(yellow card) (yellow-red card)	Sent off (straight red)	(yellow card) (red card)	Booked	(yellow card) (yellow-red card)	Sent off (straight red)	(yellow card) (red card)	Booked	(yellow card) (yellow-red card)	Sent off (straight red)	(yellow card) (red card)	Points
Honduras	1								1				–2
Jamaica					3								–3
Curaçao	3								1				–4
El Salvador	1				3				1				–5
