= 2017 Honduran Supercup =

- Poster of the event
- Event: Honduran Supercup
Motagua	Marathón
2	1
- Date: 2 August 2017
- Venue: Estadio Francisco Morazán, San Pedro Sula
- Referee: Orlando Hernández
- Weather: Rainy; 28.3 °C (83 °F)

The 2017 Honduran Supercup was a match arranged by the Honduran Liga Nacional and the Honduran Cup which took place on 2 August 2017 between F.C. Motagua, winners of the 2016–17 Liga Nacional and C.D. Marathón, overall winners of the 2017 Honduran Cup season. This was the first official edition of the Honduran Supercup and the 5th overall.

== Qualified teams ==
Team	Method of qualification	Appearances
Motagua	Winners of 2016–17 Honduran Liga Nacional	2nd
Marathón	Winners of 2017 Honduran Cup	1st

== Background ==
F.C. Motagua qualified as overall winners of the 2016–17 Honduran Liga Nacional after winning both the Apertura and Clausura tournaments. This was the first appearance for Motagua since 1999. Meanwhile, for C.D. Marathón, this was their first ever appearance in a Honduran Supercup. They qualified as winners of the 2017 Honduran Cup where they defeated C.D. Gimnástico 3–0 in the final match.

The previous match between both sides ended with a 1–2 away victory to Motagua at Estadio Yankel Rosenthal on 12 April 2017 in a league encounter.

== Match ==
In a rainy night, the game started at 19:10 CST. The rules of the game allowed the teams to make a maximum of five substitutions. After a 0–0 drawn in the first half, the goals came in the final minutes of the match. With two goals from Erick Andino (67) and Félix Crisanto (77), F.C. Motagua harvested a comfortable advantage in the score. However, Júnior Lacayo got in the score-sheet for C.D. Marathón seven minutes to regulation but were unable to level. With the win, Motagua obtained the first official Honduran Supercup in history.

2 August 2017	Motagua	2–1	Marathón	San Pedro Sula, Cortés
19:00 CST	Andino 67'; Crisanto 77'		83' Lacayo	Stadium: Estadio Francisco Morazán; Referee: Orlando Hernández

Motagua	Marathón

GK	19	(Argentina) Jonathan Rougier
DF	2	(Honduras) Juan Montes
DF	5	(Honduras) Marcelo Pereira
DF	6	(Honduras) Reinieri Mayorquín	(substituted off) 66'
DF	27	(Honduras) Félix Crisanto
DF	31	(Honduras) Klifox Bernárdez
MF	8	(Honduras) Walter Martínez	(substituted off) 46'
MF	16	(Honduras) Héctor Castellanos
FW	10	(Honduras) Erick Andino	(substituted off) 80'
FW	11	(Honduras) Marco Vega	(substituted off) 86'
FW	34	(Honduras) Kevin López	(substituted off) 66'
Substitutions:
MF	7	(Honduras) Carlos Discua	(substituted on) 46'
MF	23	(Honduras) Deybi Flores	(substituted on) 66'
DF	18	(Honduras) Wilmer Crisanto	(substituted on) 66'
DF	12	(Honduras) Raúl Santos	(substituted on) 80'
FW	9	(Honduras) Román Castillo	(substituted on) 86'
Manager:
(Argentina) Diego Vásquez

GK	29	(Panama) José Calderón
DF	2	(Honduras) Bryan Bernárdez	(substituted off) 52'
DF	3	(Honduras) Samuel Córdova
DF	4	(Brazil) Caue Fernandes
DF	12	(Honduras) José Perdomo
DF	23	(Honduras) Johnny Leverón
MF	16	(Honduras) Allan Banegas
MF	19	(Honduras) Mario Berríos	(substituted off) 69'
MF	27	(Colombia) Yustin Arboleda	(substituted off) 75'
FW	8	(Honduras) Júnior Lacayo
MF	48	(Honduras) Cristhian Cálix	(substituted off) 62'
Substitutions:
FW	24	(Cuba) Yaudel Lahera	(substituted on) 52'
MF	17	(Honduras) Wilmer Fuentes	(substituted on) 69'
MF	10	(Honduras) Joshua Vargas	(substituted on) 75'
MF	6	(Honduras) John Suazo	(substituted on) 81'
Manager:
(Argentina) Héctor Vargas

== See also ==
- 2017–18 Honduran Liga Nacional
- 2018 Honduran Cup
