= Christian Reyes =

Nicaraguan footballer (born 1998)

Personal information
- Full name: Christian Antonio Reyes Alemán
- Date of birth: 3 January 1998 (age 28)
- Place of birth: Liberia, Costa Rica
- Height: 1.87 m (6 ft 2 in)
- Position: Centre-back

Team information
- Current team: Municipal Liberia, loan from Herediano

Youth career
- Municipal Liberia

Senior career*
Years	Team	Apps	(Gls)
2015–2018	Municipal Liberia	96	(3)
2018–	Herediano	59	(6)
2021	→Guanacasteca (loan)	20	(1)
2022–	→Pérez Zeledón (loan)	14	(0)

International career^{‡}
2021–	Nicaragua	8	(0)
- * Club domestic league appearances and goals as of 19:31, 22 November 2022 (UTC) ‡ National team caps and goals as of 19:31, 22 November 2022 (UTC)

Christian Antonio Reyes Alemán (born 3 January 1998) is a professional footballer who plays as a centre-back for the Costa Rican club Liberia, on loan from Herediano. Born in Costa Rica, he plays for the Nicaragua national team.

== Career ==
Reyes began his career with his local club Municipal Liberia, and moved to Herediano in 2018. He helped the team win the 2018 CONCACAF League. He joined Guanacasteca on a short loan in July 2021. In December 2021, he joined Pérez Zeledón on a one-year loan.

== International career ==
Reyes was born in Costa Rica to a Costa Rican father and Nicaraguan mother. He debuted with the Nicaragua national team in a friendly 2–2 friendly tie with Guatemala national team on 8 September 2021.

== Honours ==
Herediano

- Liga FPD: 2018–19 Apertura, 2019–20 Apertura
- Supercopa de Costa Rica: 2020–21
- CONCACAF League: 2018
