= Estadio Carlos Calderón =

Coordinates: 15.6036264°N 87.207285°W

Carlos Calderón
- Interactive map of Carlos Calderón
- Full name: Estadio Carlos Calderón
- Location: San Juan Pueblo, Honduras
- Capacity: 2,000
- Surface: grass

Tenant
- Vida (2017)

Estadio Carlos Calderón is a football-specific stadium located in San Juan Pueblo, Atlántida, Honduras. The stadium was first used for Liga Nacional matches for the first time in 2017, as C.D.S. Vida decided to temporarily relocate from Estadio Nilmo Edwards looking for larger crowds. The stadium holds 2,000 people.

== First Liga Nacional match ==
In February 2017, C.D.S. Vida requested a temporary change of venue looking for larger crowds. Estadio Carlos Calderón was confirmed as the chosen venue. The first ever Liga Nacional was played between Vida and Juticalpa F.C. ending in a 1–1 draw.

11 February 2017 Round 1	Vida	1–1	Juticalpa	San Juan Pueblo, Atlántida
15:00 CST	Ramírez 60'	Report	13' Lanza	Stadium: Estadio Carlos Calderón; Attendance: 1,006; Referee: Geovanny Mendoza
