= Dever Orgill =

Jamaican football player (born 1990)

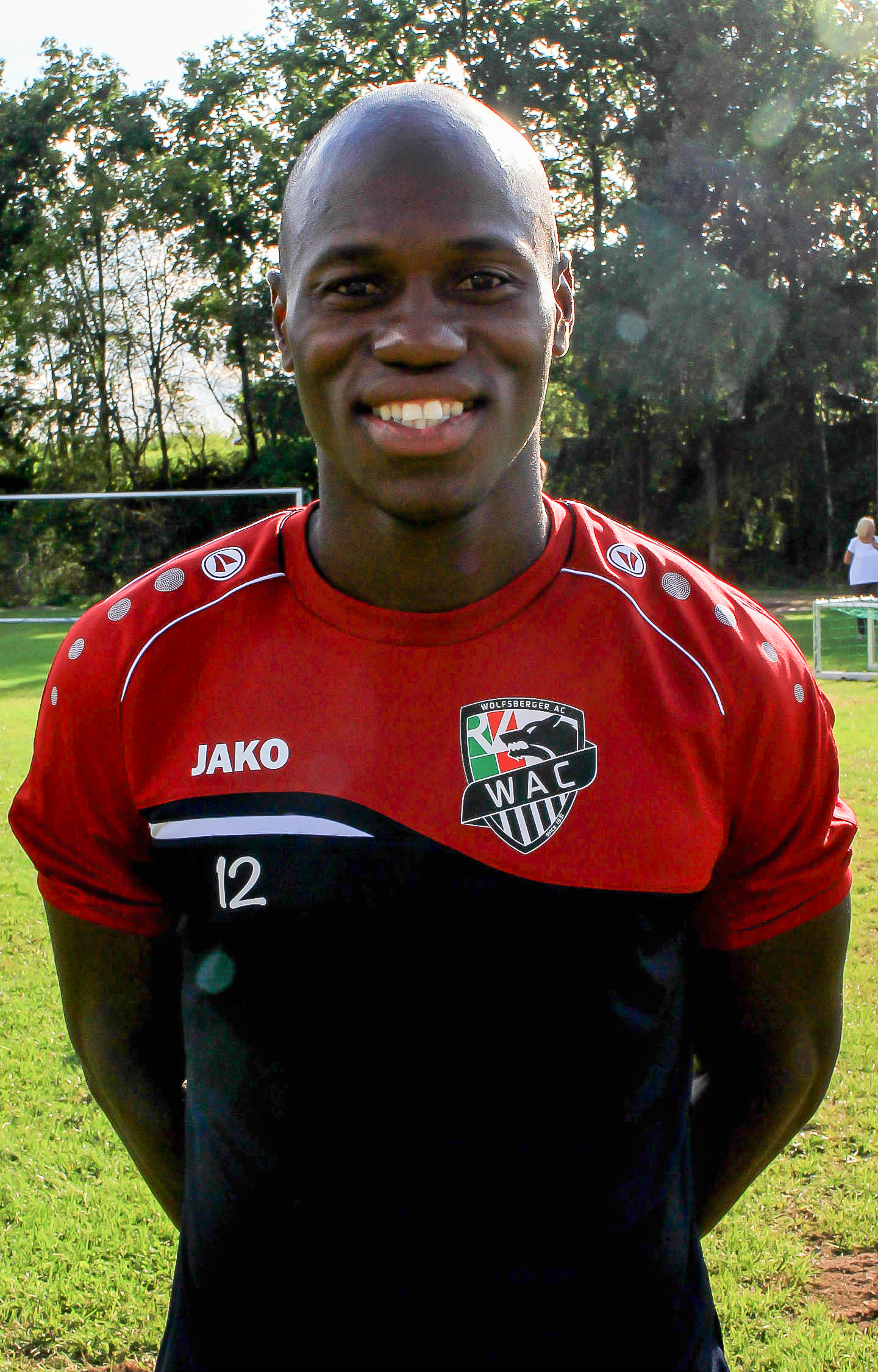

Personal information
- Full name: Dever Akeem Orgill
- Date of birth: 8 March 1990 (age 36)
- Place of birth: Port Antonio, Jamaica
- Height: 6 ft 0 in (1.83 m)
- Position: Forward

Youth career
- 2004–2007: Progressive FC

Senior career*
Years	Team	Apps	(Gls)
2008–2010	Whitecaps Residency	18	(9)
2008–2010	Vancouver Whitecaps	14	(2)
2010–2013	St. George's SC	18	(4)
2013–2016	IFK Mariehamn	80	(30)
2016–2019	Wolfsberger AC	55	(12)
2019–2020	Ankaragücü	43	(11)
2020–2021	Antalyaspor	32	(1)
2021–2022	Manisa	10	(3)
2023	Bodrumspor	5	(0)

International career^{‡}
2005–2007	Jamaica U-17	6	(12)
2008–2009	Jamaica U-20	13	(7)
2010–2019	Jamaica	18	(4)
- * Club domestic league appearances and goals as of 12 June 2023 ‡ National team caps and goals as of 19 January 2020

Dever Akeem Orgill (born 8 March 1990) is a Jamaican footballer who plays as a forward.

== Club career ==
=== Youth and amateur ===
Born in Port Antonio, Orgill attended Titchfield High School where he was coached by Andrew Edwards, and played club soccer for Progressive FC before joining the youth academy of Canadian team Vancouver Whitecaps in August 2007. He scored goals against the youth academies of Eintracht Frankfurt and Leicester City at the XXIX Dallas Cup, and played in the USL Premier Development League with the Vancouver Whitecaps Residency team in 2008.

=== Professional ===
Orgill was called up from the Vancouver Whitecaps Residency to Vancouver Whitecaps on 15 August 2008 After a promising start in 2009, Orgill suffered a knee injury in August, ruling him out for the rest of the 2009 season. In July 2010 he was released by the Whitecaps due to disciplinary infractions.

In August 2010, Orgill returned to Jamaica and signed with St. George's SC in his home parish. He returned to Canada in the autumn of 2012 and signed in late April for Vancouver Metro Soccer League side North Vancouver Federazione Calcio Campobasso. In his first season, he was the club's top scorer.

In April 2013 following a few days of trials, Orgill signed with IFK Mariehamn in Finland.

In November 2016, Orgill signed a contract with Wolfsberger AC in Austria.

On 31 January 2019, Dever Origil joined Süper Lig side Ankaragücü on a 1,5 year deal. He made his debut for Ankaragücü against Trabzonspor on 2 February 2019. He scored his first goal in a 3–0 home win against Kasımpaşa on 11 February. He was released by the club at the end of the season.

Orgill joined fellow Turkish club Antalyaspor in August 2020.

In 2021, Orgill transferred to Manisa.

In December 2022 Orgill joined Bodrumspor.

== International career ==
In 2005, he won the Golden Boot award in the Caribbean Football Union’s U15 tournament held in Trinidad and Tobago after scoring 12 goals in six matches. Orgill was the captain of the Jamaica squad during the CONCACAF U-17 World Cup qualifiers 2007, and has played in more than 10 games for the Jamaica U-20 team. Orgill made his senior national debut versus Trinidad in Kingston, Jamaica on 10 October 2010. Orgill scored his first and second international goals for Jamaica on June 17, 2019.

== Career statistics ==
=== Club ===
As of match played 12 February 2019

Appearances and goals by club, season and competition
Club	Season	League			Cup		League Cup		Other		Total	
Club	Season	Division	Apps	Goals	Apps	Goals	Apps	Goals	Apps	Goals	Apps	Goals
Vancouver Whitecaps	2009	USSF Division 2 Professional League	11	2	1	0	—				12	2
Vancouver Whitecaps	2010	USSF Division 2 Professional League	3	0	0	0	—				3	0
Vancouver Whitecaps	Total		14	2	1	0	0	0	0	0	15	2
St. George's	2010–11	National Premier League	?	2	0	0	—				?	2
IFK Mariehamn	2013	Veikkausliiga	13	8	2	3	—		1 (Note: Appearance(s) in the UEFA Europa League qualification)	0	16	11
IFK Mariehamn	2014	Veikkausliiga	12	1	0	0	—				12	1
IFK Mariehamn	2015	Veikkausliiga	27	8	4	5	4	4	—		35	17
IFK Mariehamn	2016	Veikkausliiga	28	13	1	1	—		2	0	31	14
IFK Mariehamn	Total		80	30	7	9	4	4	3	0	94	43
Wolfsberger AC	2016–17	Austrian Football Bundesliga	13	2	0	0	—				14	2
Wolfsberger AC	2017–18	Austrian Football Bundesliga	25	6	1	1	—				23	7
Wolfsberger AC	2018–19	Austrian Football Bundesliga	16	4	2	0	—				18	4
Wolfsberger AC	Total		54	12	3	1	0	0	0	0	55	13
Ankaragücü	2018–19	Süper Lig	5	5	0	0	—				2	1
Career totals			153	51	11	10	4	4	3	0	171	65

=== International ===
As of match played 29 December 2020

Jamaica national team
Year	Apps	Goals
2010	2	0
2011	0	0
2012	0	0
2013	0	0
2014	0	0
2015	2	0
2016	6	0
2017	0	0
2018	0	0
2019	8	4
Total	18	4

=== International goals ===
Scores and results list Jamaica's goal tally first.

No.	Date	Venue	Opponent	Score	Result	Competition
1.	17 June 2019	Independence Park, Kingston, Jamaica	Honduras	1–0	3–2	2019 CONCACAF Gold Cup
2.	17 June 2019	Independence Park, Kingston, Jamaica	Honduras	2–0	3–2	2019 CONCACAF Gold Cup
3.	9 September 2019	Synthetic Track and Field Facility, Leonora, Guyana	Guyana	3–0	4–0	2019–20 CONCACAF Nations League B
4.	9 September 2019	Synthetic Track and Field Facility, Leonora, Guyana	Guyana	4–0	4–0	2019–20 CONCACAF Nations League B

== Honors ==
Vancouver Whitecaps

- USL First Division: 2008

IFK Mariehamn

- Finnish Cup: 2015
- Veikkausliiga: 2016
