= Luciano Ursino =

Bolivian footballer

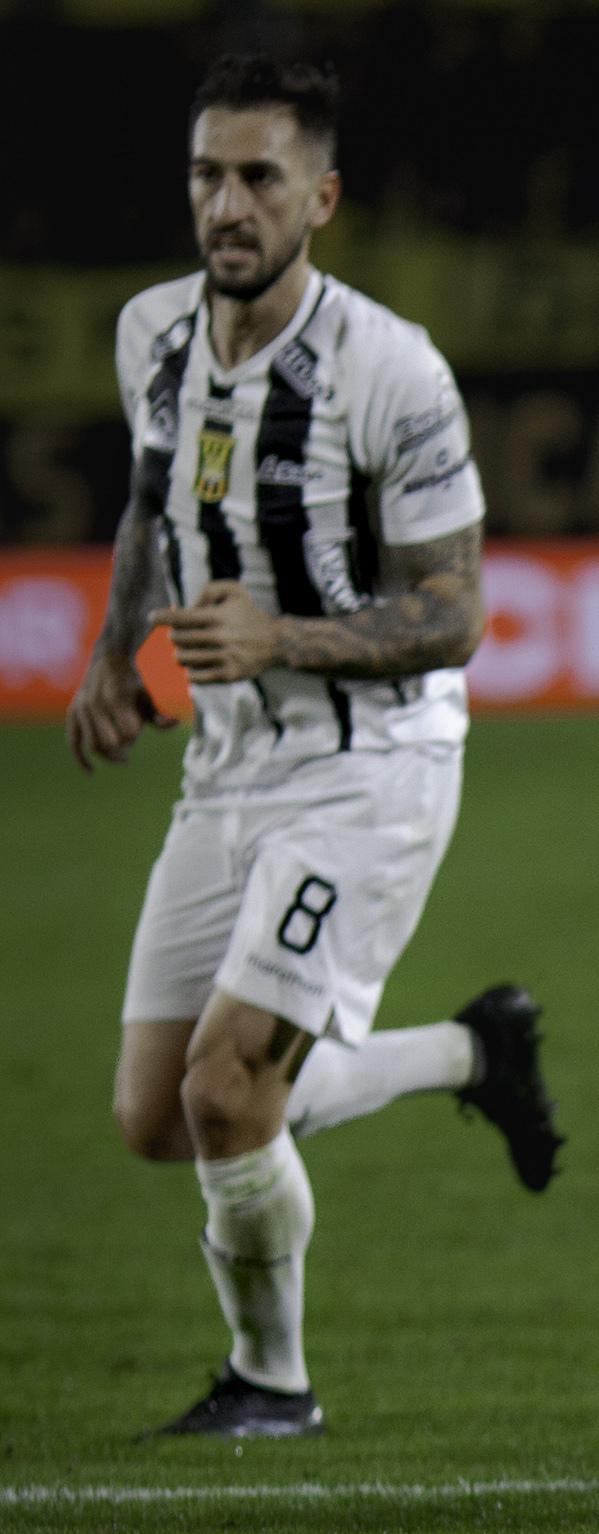

Personal information
- Full name: Luciano Nahuel Ursino Pegolo
- Date of birth: 31 October 1988 (age 38)
- Place of birth: Buenos Aires, Argentina
- Height: 1.80 m (5 ft 11 in)
- Position: Midfielder

Team information
- Current team: The Strongest
- Number: 8

Youth career
- Temperley

Senior career*
Years	Team	Apps	(Gls)
2008–2010	Temperley	30	(0)
2010–2011	3 de Febrero	28	(4)
2011	Zamora	8	(1)
2012	Independiente FBC	25	(2)
2013	Estudiantes de Mérida	32	(6)
2014	Atlético Venezuela	15	(2)
2014–2015	Deportivo La Guaira	32	(5)
2015–2016	Real España	41	(5)
2016–2017	Argentino de Merlo	36	(0)
2018–2019	Sport Boys	84	(11)
2020–2021	Royal Pari	48	(9)
2022–	The Strongest	110	(18)

International career^{‡}
2023–	Bolivia	7	(1)
- * Club domestic league appearances and goals as of 30 December 2025 ‡ National team caps and goals as of 20:27, 25 March 2024 (UTC)

Luciano Nahuel Ursino Pegolo (born 31 October 1988) is a footballer who plays for Bolivian club The Strongest. Born in Argentina, he plays for the Bolivia national team.

== Career ==
A youth product of the Argentine club, he began his senior career with in 2008. After a couple of seasons, he moved to Paraguay with 3 de Febrero in 2010. The following season, he moved to Venezuela with Zamora, then returning to Paraguay with Independiente FBC. He again returned to Venezuela with stints at Estudiantes de Mérida, Atlético Venezuela and Deportivo La Guaira. In 2015, he moved to Honduras with Real España, before returning to the Argentine fourth division with Argentino de Merlo. In 2018, he moved to the Bolivian club Sport Boys, followed by successive moves to Sport Boys and finally The Strongest in 2022.

== International career ==
Born in Argentina, Ursino was nationalized as a Bolivian citizen on 9 April 2021. In March 2023, he was called up to the Bolivia national team for a set of friendlies.

=== International goals ===
Scores and results list Bolivia's goal tally first.

No.	Date	Venue	Opponent	Score	Result	Competition
1.	27 August 2023	Estadio Félix Capriles, Cochabamba, Bolivia	Panama	1–1	1–2	Friendly
