= Diego Vásquez =

Argentine footballer & manager (born 1971)

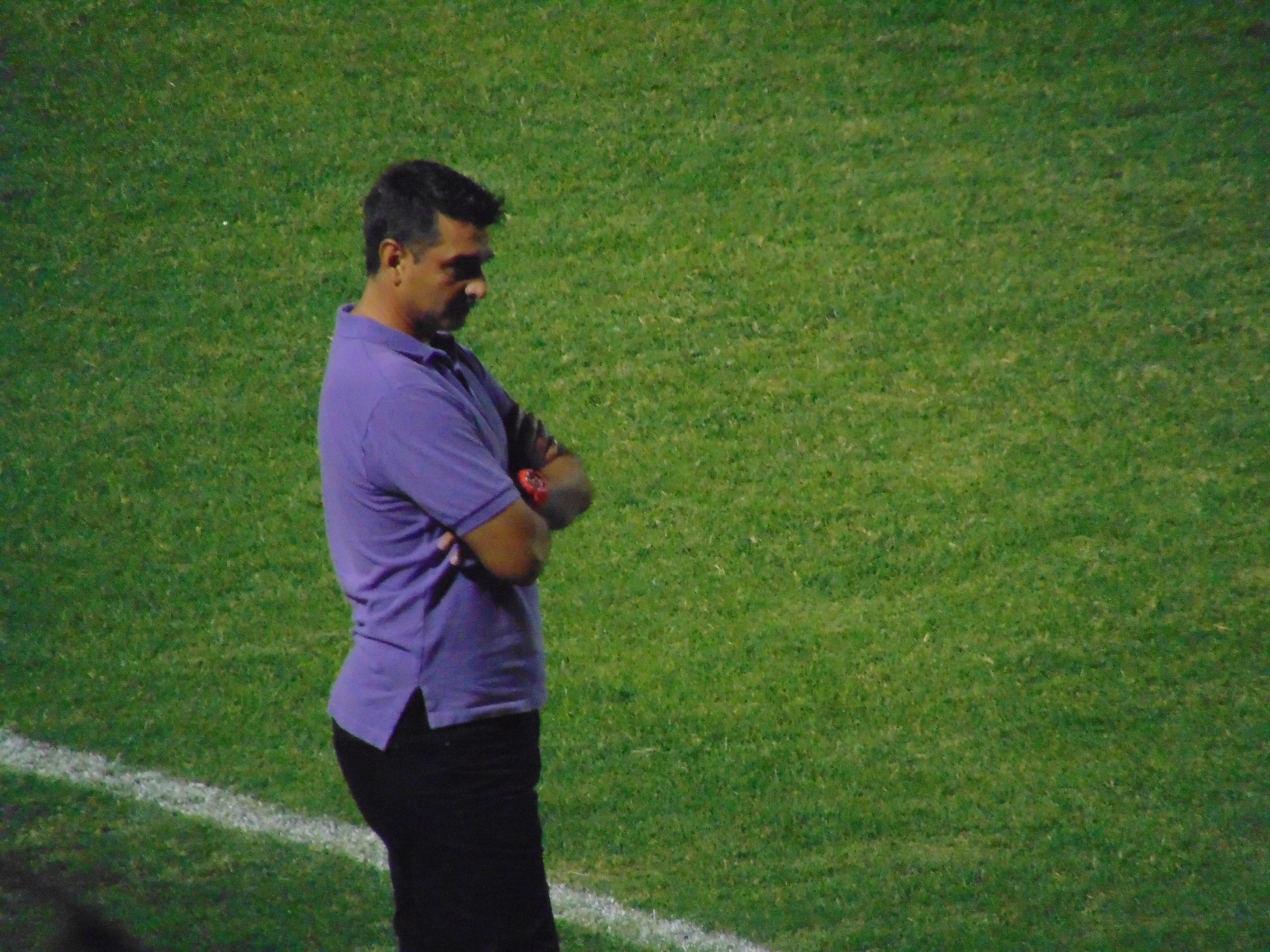
- Diego Vásquez in 2015.

Personal information
- Full name: Diego Martín Vásquez Castro
- Date of birth: 3 July 1971 (age 55)
- Place of birth: San Martín, Argentina
- Height: 1.90 m (6 ft 3 in)
- Position: Goalkeeper

Team information
- Current team: Motagua (manager)

Youth career
- –1987: San Martín

Senior career*
Years	Team	Apps	(Gls)
1987	San Martín		(0)
1987–1991	River Plate		(0)
1991–1993	Huracán		(0)
1994–1997	Independiente Rivadavia		(0)
1997–2000	Motagua		(0)
2000–2001	Marathón		(0)
2001–2002	Motagua		(0)
2002–2004	Universidad	55	(0)
2004	Municipal Valencia	18	(0)
2005	Suchitepéquez	4	(0)
2006	Marathón		(0)
2007	Vida	14	(0)
2007–2010	Victoria	36	(0)
2010–2011	Deportes Savio	29	(0)
Total		156+	(0)

Managerial career
- 2013–2022: Motagua
- 2022: Honduras (interim)
- 2022–2023: Honduras
- 2023: Puntarenas
- 2023–: Motagua
- * Club domestic league appearances and goals

Diego Martín Vásquez Castro (born 3 July 1971) is an Argentine football coach and former player who is the manager of Honduran club Motagua.

== Club career ==
Nicknamed Barbie, Vásquez played most of his career in Honduras as a goalkeeper, most notably for F.C. Motagua where he conquered several titles and individual awards. He began his career playing for his hometown club San Martín de Mendoza.

His debut for Motagua occurred on 24 August 1997, where he saved two penalty kicks in the 1–0 victory over C.D.S. Vida. According to Diego, his most memorable event as a player took place in the final series of the 1999–2000 Honduran Liga Nacional season against Club Deportivo Olimpia where after a 0–0 global score, the title had to be decided by penalty shoot-outs in which Vásquez saved the decisive kick to give Motagua its 8th national championship.

Vásquez retired from professional football in 2011 playing for Deportes Savio.

== Managerial career ==
Just as he did as a player, Vásquez began with F.C. Motagua his career as a manager in Honduras in 2013. The first achievement under his management occurred only a year after in the 2014–15 season, a success which represented Motagua's 13th national title. In his first shot as a manager, he already owns the accomplishment of having over 300 consecutive games leading a Honduran Liga Nacional club as a coach, surpassing Carlos Padilla, also with Motagua.

On 27 November 2023, Vásquez returned to Motagua.

== Honors ==
=== Player ===
Motagua

- Honduran Liga Nacional (5): 1997–98 A, 1997–98 C, 1999–2000 A, 1999–2000 C, 2001–02 A
- Honduran Liga Nacional best goalkeeper (2): 1997–98 A, 1997–98 C

Universidad

- Honduran Liga Nacional best goalkeeper (1): 2004–05 C

=== Manager ===
Motagua

- Honduran Liga Nacional (5): 2014–15 A, 2016–17 A, 2016–17 C, 2018–19 A, 2018–19 C
- Honduran Supercup (1): 2017
