= Luis Caraballo =

Colombian footballer (born 1991)

Personal information
- Full name: Luis Eduardo Caraballo Bechio
- Date of birth: December 30, 1991 (age 34)
- Place of birth: Cartagena, Bolívar, Colombia
- Height: 5 ft 11 in (1.80 m)
- Position: Central defender

Team information
- Current team: Real Sociedad
- Number: 4

Senior career*
Years	Team	Apps	(Gls)
2011–2016	Real Cartagena	78	(1)
2016	Louletano	3	(0)
2017–	Real Sociedad	13	(0)
- * Club domestic league appearances and goals as of 11 June 2017

Luis Caraballo (born December 30, 1991) is a Colombian footballer who currently plays for Liga Nacional de Honduras. Previously, he played as a defender at Real Sociedad. He is currently without the contract.
