= Henry Figueroa =

Honduran footballer (born 1992)

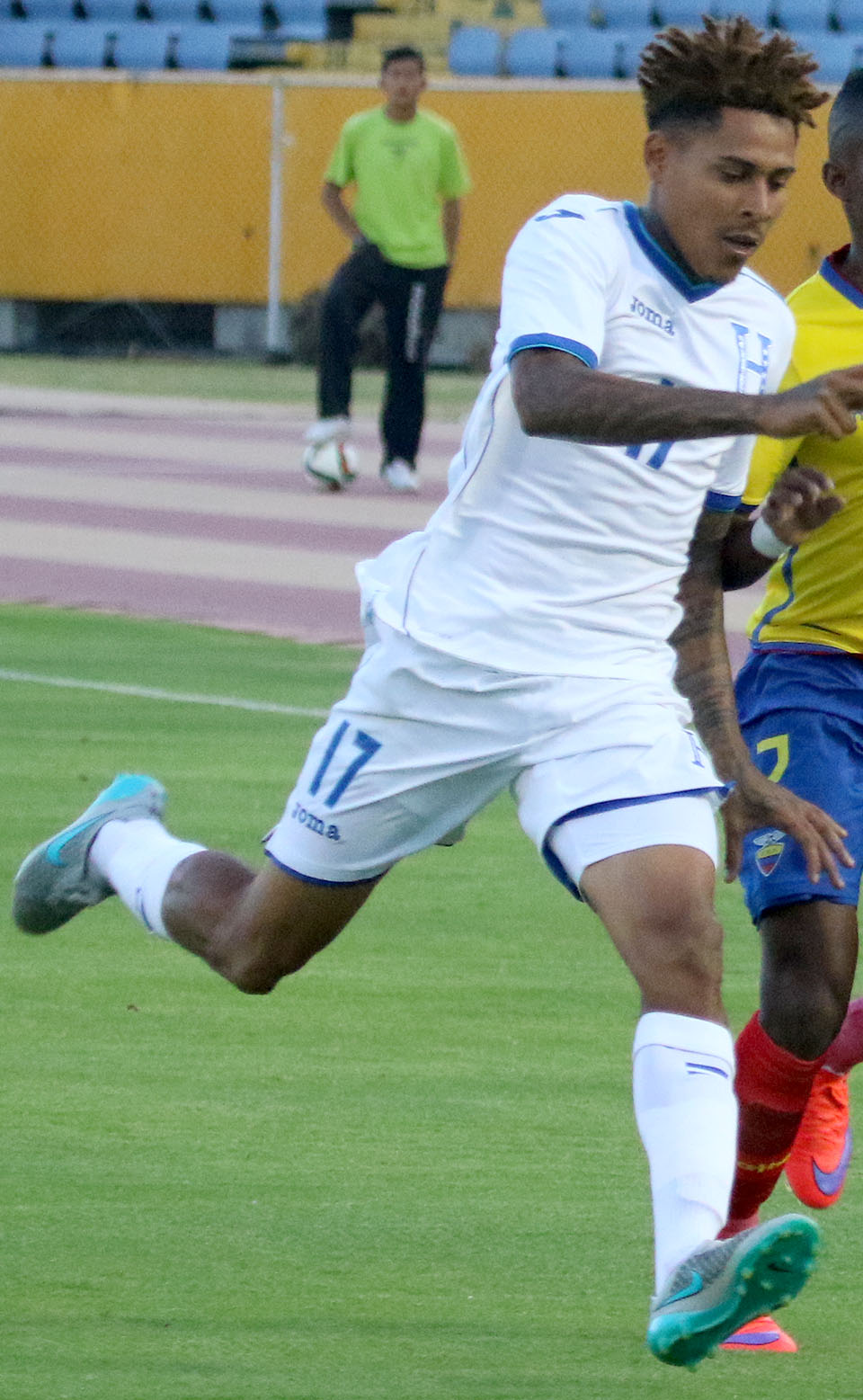

Personal information
- Full name: Henry Adalberto Figueroa Alonzo
- Date of birth: 28 December 1992 (age 33)
- Place of birth: Santa Fe, Colón, Honduras
- Height: 1.78 m (5 ft 10 in)
- Position: Centre-back

Senior career*
Years	Team	Apps	(Gls)
2012–2018	Motagua	164	(3)
2018–2020	Alajuelense	34	(3)
2020	Marathón	6	(1)
2022	Vida	11	(0)

International career^{‡}
2014–2019	Honduras	48	(0)
- * Club domestic league appearances and goals as of 7 October 2022 ‡ National team caps and goals as of 14 September 2020

Henry Adalberto Figueroa Alonzo (born 28 December 1992) is a Honduran professional footballer who plays as a centre-back. He previously represented the Honduras national team. In October 2022, he received a 2-year suspension for doping violations until 22 June 2024.

== Club career ==
=== Motagua ===
Figueroa developed in F.C. Motagua's reserve team during his youth and was promoted to the first team in January 2012 at the age of 19. He made his debut was on 4 August 2012, in the 2–0 victory over Platense F.C. With Motagua, he won four league titles and one Honduran Supercup in 2017.

=== Alajuelense ===
On 20 December 2018, Figueroa signed with Costa Rican club Liga Deportiva Alajuelense. He made his debut on 19 January 2019 in a 1–0 home loss against A.D. San Carlos. He scored his first goal with the team the following 17 February in a 3–0 win against Guadalupe F.C. On 22 December 2019, news was released that Figueroa was selected by the Anti-Doping Commission of Costa Rica to take a doping test after Alajuelense's first leg loss against C.S. Herediano in the Apertura grand final on 8 December, however he did not appear. The next day, the club announced that Figueroa had terminated his contract. On 7 January 2020, the Costa Rican Football Federation declared Figueroa's actions of evading the doping test as doping. An investigation was conducted on Figueroa and had he been found guilty of doping he would have faced 4 years of suspension from footballing activity.

=== Marathón ===
On 20 January 2020, Honduran club C.D. Marathón announced the signing of Figueroa. He made his competitive debut the following 2 February in a 2–1 win against C.D. Honduras Progreso. He scored his first goal on 16 February in a 5–2 win against Platense. In July 2020, he received a temporary suspension for violating two articles of the World Anti-Doping Code.

=== Vida ===
On 28 January 2022, Figueroa returned to professional football, signing a two–year contract with C.D.S. Vida in the Honduran first division.

== Honors ==
=== Club ===
Motagua

- Liga Nacional: 2014 Apertura, 2016 Apertura, 2017 Clausura, 2018 Apertura
- Honduran Supercup: 2017
