= Félix Crisanto =

Honduran footballer (born 1990)

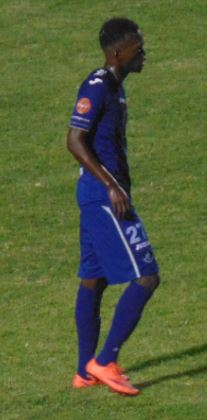
- Crisanto in 2015

Personal information
- Full name: Félix Joan Crisanto Velásquez
- Date of birth: 9 September 1990 (age 36)
- Place of birth: Brus Laguna, Honduras
- Height: 1.84 m (6 ft 1/2 in)
- Position: Right-back

Team information
- Current team: Marathón

Senior career*
Years	Team	Apps	(Gls)
2008–2015	Victoria	121	(11)
2015–2021	Motagua	125	(10)
2018–2019	→ BUAP (loan)	24	(0)
2021–2022	Olimpia	21	(1)

International career^{‡}
2016–2021	Honduras	22	(0)
- * Club domestic league appearances and goals as of 14 August 2021 ‡ National team caps and goals as of 14 July 2021

Félix Joan Crisanto Velásquez (born 9 September 1990) is a Honduran professional footballer who plays as a right-back for Marathón.

== Club career ==
=== Victoria ===
Crisanto made his professional debut with C.D. Victoria at the age of 18 in a 2–1 away defeat against C.D. Olimpia on 4 October 2008.

=== Motagua ===
On 20 June 2015, Crisanto joined F.C. Motagua. During the 2016–17 season, he won both the Apertura and Clausura championships.

=== Lobos BUAP ===
On 31 July 2018, he joined Liga MX club Lobos BUAP on a season-long loan. He made his league debut in a 2–1 loss against C.F. Monterrey the following 22 August.

=== Olimpia ===
In August 2021, Crisanto joined C.D. Olimpia. He scored in his debut against Real Sociedad on 8 August.

== International career ==
Crisanto made his debut for the national team in a 5–0 victory against Belize on 2 November 2016. On 29 June 2017, he was named to the 23 man squad for the 2017 CONCACAF Gold Cup. On 6 June 2019, he was named to the 23 man squad for the 2019 Gold Cup.

== Career statistics ==
=== Club ===
Appearances and goals by club, season and competition
Club	Division	League			National Cup		International		Total	
Club	Division	Season	Apps	Goals	Apps	Goals	Apps	Goals	Apps	Goals
Victoria	Liga Nacional	2008-09	1	0	—		—		1	0
Victoria	Liga Nacional	2009-10	0	0	—		—		0	0
Victoria	Liga Nacional	2010-11	6	1	—		—		6	1
Victoria	Liga Nacional	2011-12	9	1	—		—		9	1
Victoria	Liga Nacional	2012-13	41	3	—		—		41	3
Victoria	Liga Nacional	2013-14	33	1	—		3	0	36	1
Victoria	Liga Nacional	2014-15	31	5	0	0	—		31	5
Victoria	Total		121	11	0	0	3	0	124	11
Motagua	Liga Nacional	2015-16	32	2	3	0	3	1	38	3
Motagua	Liga Nacional	2016-17	31	6	1	1	—		32	7
Motagua	Liga Nacional	2017-18	35	0	0	0	1	0	36	0
Motagua	Total		98	8	4	1	4	1	106	10
BUAP	Liga MX	2018-19	24	0	0	0	—		24	0
Motagua	Liga Nacional	2019-20	24	2	0	0	7	0	31	2
Motagua	Liga Nacional	2020-21	3	0	0	0	2	0	3	0
Motagua	Total		27	2	0	0	9	0	36	2
Olimpia	Liga Nacional	2021-22	21	1	—		1	0	22	1
Marathón	Liga Nacional	2022-23	39	3	—		—		39	3
Career total			330	25	4	1	17	1	351	27

== Honours ==
Motagua

- Liga Nacional: 2016–17 Apertura, 2016–17 Clausura
- Honduran Supercup: 2017

== Personal life ==
Crisanto's cousin, Wilmer, is also a footballer. He currently plays with C.D. Marathón.
