= Alberth Villalobos =

Costa Rican football player (born 1995)

Personal information
- Full name: Alberth Mauricio Villalobos Solís
- Date of birth: 25 January 1995 (age 31)
- Place of birth: Grecia, Grecia, Costa Rica
- Height: 1.76 m (5 ft 9 in)
- Position: Forward

Team information
- Current team: Municipal Grecia
- Number: 27

Senior career*
Years	Team	Apps	(Gls)
2015–2016	Alajuelense	1	(0)
2015	→ Carmelita (loan)	5	(0)
2016–2018	Grecia	31	(10)
2018–	Herediano	39	(4)
2019–2020	→ San Carlos (loan)	22	(7)
2020	→ Grecia (loan)	24	(3)
2021-22	Guadalupe F.C.	12	(0)
2022	Mixco	7	(0)
2023	San Carlos	16	(0)
2023-	Municipal Grecia	28	(1)

International career
2019–	Costa Rica	1	(0)
- * Club domestic league appearances and goals

Alberth Villalobos (born 25 January 1995) is a Costa Rican footballer who plays as a midfielder for Municipal Grecia.

== Career ==
He was playing at Municipal Grecia in 2018. The following year he was playing for A.D. San Carlos. In December 2020, Villalobos he returned to help save Municipal Grecia from relegation.

In the summer of 2023, he rejoined Municipal Grecia for a third time in his career.

== International career ==
Villalobos made his debut for the senior Costa Rica national team at the Avaya Stadium on 2 February 2019 against the United States.
