= Luis López (footballer, born September 1993) =

Honduran footballer

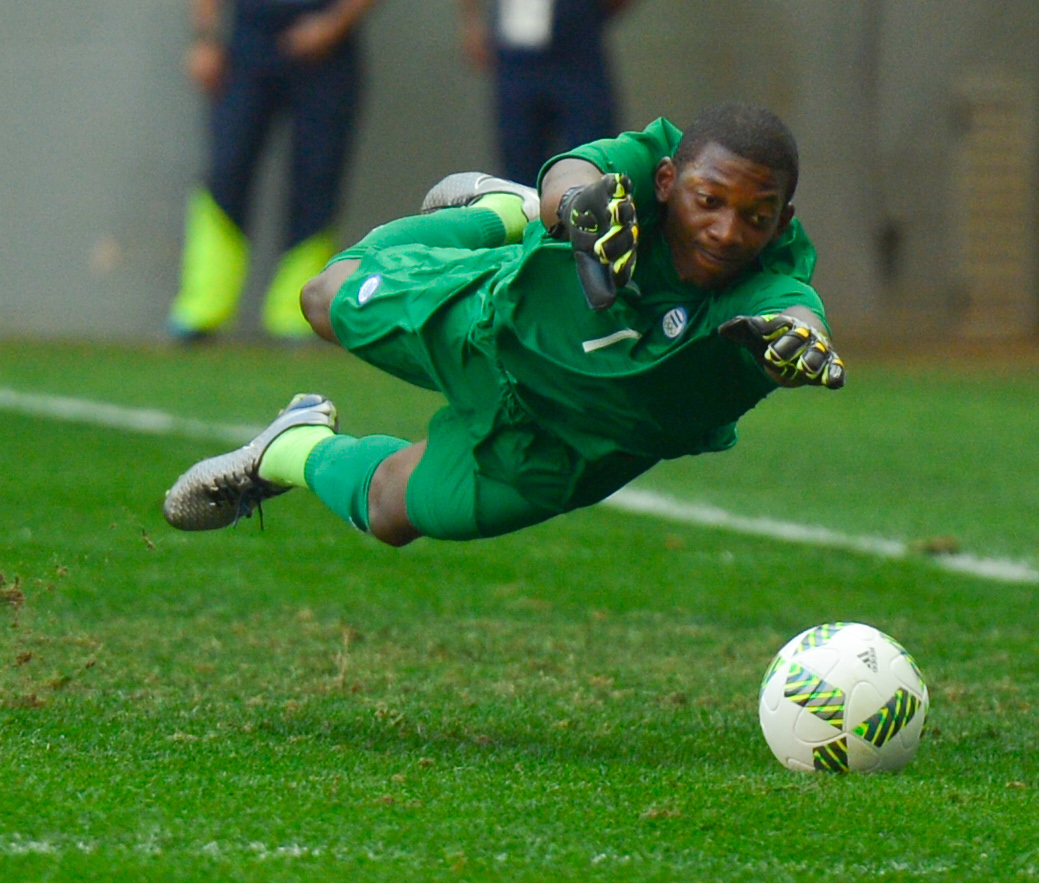
- López with Honduras at the 2016 Summer Olympics

Personal information
- Full name: Luis Aurelio López Fernández
- Date of birth: September 13, 1993 (age 33)
- Place of birth: San Pedro Sula, Honduras
- Height: 1.83 m (6 ft 0 in)
- Position: Goalkeeper

Team information
- Current team: Real España
- Number: 22

Youth career
- Real España

Senior career*
Years	Team	Apps	(Gls)
2013–	Real España	334	(0)
2018	→ Los Angeles FC (loan)	1	(0)
2018	→ Orange County SC (loan)	5	(0)

International career^{‡}
2013	Honduras U20	6	(0)
2014–2016	Honduras U23	9	(0)
2015–2024	Honduras	60	(0)
Medal record
Men's football
Representing Honduras
CONCACAF Nations League
Third place	2021
- * Club domestic league appearances and goals as of 30 August 2025 ‡ National team caps and goals as of 11 September 2024

Luis Aurelio López Fernández (born 13 September 1993), also known as Buba López, is a Honduran professional footballer who plays as a goalkeeper for Real España.

== Club career ==
=== Real España ===
López started his career with Liga Nacional team Real C.D. España in 2013. He started and did all his training, In 2012 he arrived at Real España where during the first tournaments he did not participate, since he was the fourth goalkeeper In the reserves of Real Club Deportivo España. His debut for Real España took place in September 2013, in a Clásico Sampedrano against Marathón, during Matchday 5 of the 2013 Apertura Tournament the match ended in a 1–1 draw. He won the 2013 Apertura title and was integral for his side in the final against Real Sociedad.

=== LAFC and Orange County SC loan ===
On 24 January 2018, Major League Soccer side Los Angeles FC announced the signing of López on loan from Real España. The following 31 January, it was announced that López was rehabbing from a stress fracture in his right tibia. After being out six months, he was loaned to Los Angeles FC's affiliate Orange County SC on 13 July. The next day, he started his first match in a 3–0 home win against San Antonio FC in the USL Championship. He was later recalled and started his first league game in the MLS in a 2–0 home loss against Sporting Kansas City.

He returned to Real España after Los Angeles FC opted not to exercise his buy option.

== International career ==
=== Honduras U-23 ===
López was included in the Honduras squad for the football competition at the 2016 Summer Olympics in Rio de Janeiro. The year prior, Honduras had lost the final of the 2015 CONCACAF Men's Olympic Qualifying Championship to Mexico, but qualification was sealed for both nations and Honduras qualified for their third straight Olympics. López was the first-choice keeper throughout the tournament but kept only one clean sheet. He helped Honduras to the knockout stage, where they were eliminated by Brazil in the semi-finals. López started in the bronze-medal match, in which Honduras were defeated by Nigeria.

=== Honduras ===
López was an unused third goalkeeper for Honduras' 2014 World Cup campaign. His first major role for the national team was when he was selected as the starting keeper for Honduras in the 2017 CONCACAF Gold Cup. López struggled with an injury throughout the tournament and ultimately Honduras were eliminated in the quarter-finals by Mexico.

== Career statistics ==
=== Club ===
As of match played on 30 August 2025

Appearances and goals by club, season and competition
Club	Season	League			Cup		Continental		Other		Total	
Club	Season	Division	Apps	Goals	Apps	Goals	Apps	Goals	Apps	Goals	Apps	Goals
Real España	2013–14	Liga Nacional	34	0	—		—		—		34	0
Real España	2014–15	Liga Nacional	28	0	—		2 (Note: Appearances in the CONCACAF Champions Cup)	0	—		30	0
Real España	2016–17	Liga Nacional	23	0	—		—		—		23	0
Real España	2016–17	Liga Nacional	32	0	—		—		—		32	0
Real España	2017–18	Liga Nacional	7	0	—		—		—		7	0
Real España	2018–19	Liga Nacional	17	0	—		—		—		17	0
Real España	2019–20	Liga Nacional	29	0	—		—		—		29	0
Real España	2020–21	Liga Nacional	25	0	—		—		—		25	0
Real España	2021–22	Liga Nacional	35	0	—		—		—		35	0
Real España	2022–23	Liga Nacional	36	0	—		10 (Note: Eight appearances in the CONCACAF League and two in the CONCACAF Champions Cup)	0	—		46	0
Real España	2023–24	Liga Nacional	19	0	—		—		—		19	0
Real España	2024–25	Liga Nacional	27	0	—		—		—		27	0
Real España	2025–26	Liga Nacional	3	0	—		4 (Note: Appearances in the CONCACAF Central American Cup)	0	—		7	0
Real España	Total		315	0	—		16	0	—		331	0
Los Angeles FC (loan)	2018	Major League Soccer	1	0	—		—		—		1	0
Orange County SC (loan)	2018	USL Championship	5	0	—		—		—		5	0
Career total			321	0	0	0	16	0	0	0	337	0

=== International ===
As of match played 11 September 2024

National team	Year	Apps	Goals
Honduras
Honduras	2014	0	0
Honduras	2015	1	0
Honduras	2016	0	0
Honduras	2017	11	0
Honduras	2018	3	0
Honduras	2019	11	0
Honduras	2020	2	0
Honduras	2021	15	0
Honduras	2022	11	0
Honduras	2023	4	0
Honduras	2024	2	0
Total		60	0

== Honours ==
Real C.D. España

- Liga Nacional: 2013 Apertura, 2017 Apertura

Honduras

- CONCACAF Nations League third place: 2021

Individual

- CONCACAF Nations League Golden Glove: 2019–20
- CONCACAF Nations League Finals Best XI: 2021
