= Francisco Reyes (footballer, born 1990) =

Honduran footballer

Personal information
- Full name: Francisco Javier Reyes Acosta
- Date of birth: 7 February 1990 (age 36)
- Place of birth: La Ceiba, Honduras
- Position: Goalkeeper

Team information
- Current team: Club Deportivo Victoria
- Number: 36

Youth career
- Olimpia

Senior career*
Years	Team	Apps	(Gls)
2010–2013	Olimpia		

International career
2007–2008	Honduras U-17		
2009–2010	Honduras U-20		
- * Club domestic league appearances and goals

Francisco Javier Reyes Acosta (born 7 February 1990 in La Ceiba, Honduras) is a Honduran footballer who currently plays as a goalkeeper for Liga Nacional de Honduras club Club Deportivo Victoria.

== International career ==
Reyes has represented his country at the 2007 FIFA U-17 World Cup, the 2009 FIFA U-20 World Cup and was a non-playing squad member at the 2012 Summer Olympics.
