= Claudio Cardozo =

Uruguayan footballer (born 1983)

Personal information
- Full name: Claudio Nicolás Cardozo Lobarinas
- Date of birth: 24 April 1983 (age 43)
- Place of birth: Montevideo, Uruguay
- Height: 1.81 m (5 ft 11 1/2 in)
- Position: Forward

Team information
- Current team: Real España

Youth career
- ????–2003: Liverpool

Senior career*
Years	Team	Apps	(Gls)
2003–2005	Liverpool		(1)
2005–2006	Sud América		
2006–2007	12 de Octubre		
2007–2008	Atlético Olanchano		
2008–2009	Vida		(13)
2009–2010	Tijuana	14	(4)
2010	Marquense	10	(3)
2010–2012	Marathón	31	(18)
2012	Hunan Billows	19	(1)
2013–2017	Real España	150	(69)
- * Club domestic league appearances and goals

Claudio Nicolás Cardozo Lobarinas (Latin American Spanish: [ˈklawðjo kaɾˈðoso]; born April 24, 1983) is a Uruguayan football midfielder, who currently plays for Real España.

== Club career ==
=== Marathon ===
Cardozo made his competitive debut for Marathon in CONCACAF Champions League preliminary round scoring his first brace for the club, as he scored twice in a 0–3 win over Tauro F.C. on 28 July 2010 . He made his debut in the Liga Nacional de Fútbol de Honduras for El Monstruo Verde on 11 August, and scored his first goal on 29 August 2010 against Vida.

=== Hunan Billows ===
China League One club Hunan Billows announced that they had signed Cardozo from Marathón on 8 February 2012.
