= Kevin López (footballer) =

Honduran footballer (born 1996)

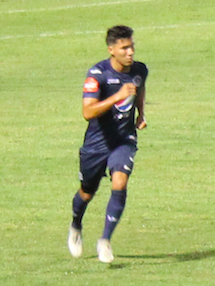
- López with Motagua in 2018

Personal information
- Full name: Kevin Josué López Maldonado
- Date of birth: 3 February 1996 (age 30)
- Place of birth: Santa Rita, Honduras
- Height: 1.70 m (5 ft 7 in)
- Position: Midfielder

Team information
- Current team: Olimpia
- Number: 34

Youth career
- Atlético Choloma
- 2013–2014: Motagua

Senior career*
Years	Team	Apps	(Gls)
2014–2022	Motagua	188	(37)
2022–2023	Comunicaciones	40	(4)
2023–	Olimpia	73	(13)

International career^{‡}
2013	Honduras U17	4	(0)
2014–2015	Honduras U20	8	(0)
2014	Honduras U21	5	(1)
2015	Honduras U23	3	(0)
2019–	Honduras	13	(2)
- * Club domestic league appearances and goals as of 11:43, 18 May 2025 (UTC) ‡ National team caps and goals as of 20:00, 29 March 2023 (UTC)

Kevin Josué López Maldonado (born 3 February 1996), nicknamed El Choloma, is a Honduran professional footballer who plays as a midfielder for Olimpia and the Honduras national team.

After being at the Atlético Choloma youth academy, López would begin his career with Motagua, where he won five league titles and one Honduran Supercup. In 2022, López would make the move to Comunicaciones and won one league title. A year later, he signed with Olimpia and has won four league titles with the club.

Having previously been capped by Honduras' under-17, under-20, under-21, and under-23 teams, López made his debut for the senior team in September 2019. He was also part of Honduras' squad for the 2021 CONCACAF Gold Cup.

== Club career ==
=== Motagua ===
López made his professional debut with Motagua in a 2–1 Liga Nacional win over Parrillas One on 13 April 2014, scoring the game winner in the 88th minute.

=== Comunicaciones ===
On 11 January 2022, López confirmed that he had signed with Comunicaciones.

== International career ==
López made his senior debut with the Honduras national team in a 4–0 friendly win over Puerto Rico on 6 September 2019.

== Career statistics ==
Scores and results list Honduras' goal tally first.

List of international goals scored by Kevin López
No.	Date	Venue	Opponent	Score	Result	Competition
1	24 March 2022	Estadio Rommel Fernández, Panama City, Panama	Panama	1–1	1–1	2022 FIFA World Cup qualification
2	13 June 2022	Estadio Olímpico Metropolitano, San Pedro Sula, Honduras	Canada	1–0	2–1	2022–23 CONCACAF Nations League A

== Honours ==
Motagua

- Liga Nacional de Honduras: 2014 Apertura, 2016 Apertura, 2017 Clausura, 2018 Apertura, 2019 Clausura
- Honduran Supercup: 2017

Comunicaciones

- Liga Nacional de Guatemala: 2022 Clausura
