= Fabián Coito =

Uruguayan footballer and manager (born 1967)

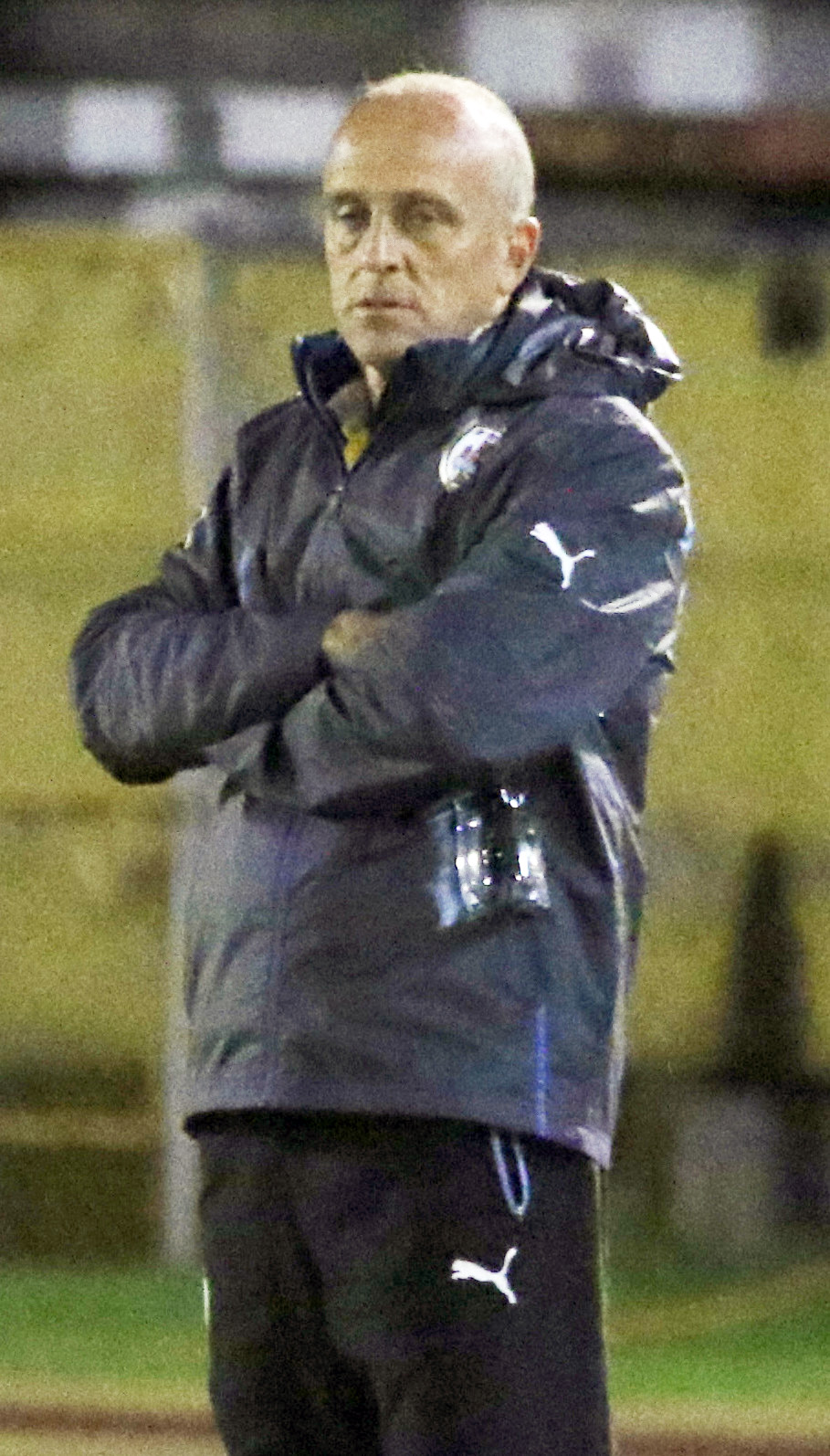
- Coito in 2017

Personal information
- Full name: Fabián Coito Machado
- Date of birth: 3 March 1967 (age 59)
- Place of birth: Montevideo, Uruguay
- Height: 1.79 m (5 ft 10 in)
- Position: Defender

Senior career*
Years	Team	Apps	(Gls)
1988–1992	Montevideo Wanderers		
1992–1993	Cerro		
1993	Provincial Osorno	27	(0)
1994–1995	Olimpia Honduras		

Managerial career
- 2004: Central Español
- 2007–2009: Uruguay U15
- 2010–2013: Uruguay U17
- 2014–2019: Uruguay U20
- 2018: Uruguay (caretaker)
- 2019–2021: Honduras
- 2019: Honduras U23
- 2022: Alajuelense
- 2023: Deportivo Maldonado
- 2024–2025: Uruguay U20
Medal record
Men's football
Representing Uruguay (as manager)
FIFA U-17 World Cup
Runner-up	2011
Representing Honduras (as manager)
CONCACAF Nations League
Bronze medal – third place	2021
- * Club domestic league appearances and goals

Fabián Coito Machado (born 3 March 1967) is a Uruguayan football manager and former player who played as a defender.

== Playing career ==
Born in Montevideo, Coito represented hometown sides Montevideo Wanderers and Cerro before moving abroad in 1993, with Chilean side Provincial Osorno. In 1994, he joined Honduran side Olimpia, and retired with them in 1995, aged 28.

== Managerial career ==
=== Uruguay ===
After starting out at Central Español in 2004, Coito was the coach of Uruguay's under-15, under-17 and under-20 national teams. He briefly was the manager of the senior Uruguay national team until Óscar Tabárez renewed his contract with ‘La Celeste’ and was reinstated as head coach.

=== Honduras ===
In February 2019, Coito left Uruguay and was announced as the new manager of the Honduras national football team. Coito's first match for Honduras was on 26 March 2019, in a friendly goalless match against Ecuador. In the 2019 CONCACAF Gold Cup, Coito came under criticism as his Honduras side was eliminated very early on from the tournament after losing to Jamaica and Curaçao. Despite this, Honduras went on to win 4–0 against El Salvador giving Coito his first win with ‘Los Catrachos’. In 2021, Coito managed Honduras to a third-place finish in 2021 CONCACAF Nations League Finals after beating rivals Costa Rica on penalties. Coito also managed Honduras throughout the 2021 CONCACAF Gold Cup where Honduras was eliminated in the Quarterfinals by Mexico. On 13 October 2021, Coito was sacked by Honduras after a string of poor results throughout the 2022 World Cup Qualifiers which included three losses and three draws in six matches.

=== Alajuelense ===
On 13 July 2022, Coito was appointed manager of Costa Rican side Alajuelense. On 10 November, after being eliminated from the league in the semifinals, he left the club.

=== Deportivo Maldonado ===
On 19 November 2022, Coito was confirmed as Deportivo Maldonado manager for the 2023 season. On 15 December 2023, he left the club on a mutual agreement.

== Honours ==
=== Manager ===
==== International ====
Uruguay U20

- South American Youth Football Championship: 2017
