= Richard Dixon (footballer, born 1992) =

Panamanian professional footballer

Personal information
- Full name: Richard Ernesto Dixon Amague
- Date of birth: 28 March 1992 (age 34)
- Place of birth: Panama
- Height: 1.81 m (5 ft 11 in)
- Position: Centre-back

Team information
- Current team: Plaza Amador
- Number: 13

Youth career
- –2010: Sporting San Miguelito

Senior career*
Years	Team	Apps	(Gls)
2010–2013	Sporting San Miguelito	52	(1)
2014–2016	Chorrillo	48	(1)
2016	Limón	15	(1)
2016–2017	Platense	33	(3)
2017–2018	Águila	13	(2)
2018	Tauro	14	(2)
2018	Limón	11	(1)
2019–	Plaza Amador	0	(0)

International career
2012–	Panama	8	(0)
- * Club domestic league appearances and goals as of 11 February 2019

Richard Dixon (born 28 March 1992) is a Panamanian professional footballer who plays as a centre-back for Plaza Amador.

== Club career ==
=== Chorrillo ===
He joined Chorrillo from Sporting San Miguelito in January 2014.

=== Limón ===
In 2016, Dixon signed with Limón of Costa Rica.

=== Águila ===
Dixon signed with Águila of the Salvadoran Primera División for Apertura 2017 tournament. With the team of San Miguel, Dixon experienced a serious salary delay, which was solved at the end of the tournament.

== International career ==
Dixon made his debut for Panama in a November 2012 friendly match against Spain and has, as of 10 June 2015, earned a total of 5 caps, scoring no goals. He represented his country at the 2013 CONCACAF Gold Cup.

== Honours ==
Panama

- CONCACAF Gold Cup runner-up: 2013
