= Jerrel Britto =

Trinidadian footballer (born 1992)

Personal information
- Full name: Jerrel Pete Jesse Britto
- Date of birth: 4 July 1992 (age 34)
- Place of birth: Port of Spain
- Height: 1.79 m (5 ft 10 in)
- Position: Forward

Youth career
- 2006–2010: San Juan Jabloteh

Senior career*
Years	Team	Apps	(Gls)
2010–2011	San Juan Jabloteh	3	(3)
2012–2015	W Connection	51	(27)
2015–2016	Murciélagos	0	(0)
2015–2016	→ Malacateco (loan)	11	(2)
2016–2017	Ma Pau Stars	10	(9)
2017–2018	Honduras Progreso	36	(11)
2018	Real Sociedad	11	(1)
2018	Platense	13	(2)
2019	Honduras Progreso	14	(4)

International career^{‡}
2011	Trinidad and Tobago U20	6	(3)
2012	Trinidad and Tobago U23	1	(0)
2017–	Trinidad and Tobago	1	(0)
- * Club domestic league appearances and goals as of 1 January 2020 ‡ National team caps and goals as of 18 October 2017

Jerrel Pete Jesse Britto (born 4 July 1992), known as Jerrel Britto, is a Trinidadian professional footballer who most recently played for Honduras Progreso of Liga Nacional de Honduras and the Trinidad and Tobago national team.

== Club career ==
Britto was born in Port of Spain. On 16 February 2017, he signed for Honduras Progreso. In his first season with the club he scored six times, including a goal in the Clausura semifinals against Olimpia.

== International career ==
On 29 April 2017, Britto made his senior debut for the Trinidad and Tobago national team, starting and playing 64 minutes in a 2–2 draw against Grenada.
