= Rubilio Castillo =

Honduran footballer (born 1991)

Personal information
- Full name: Román Rubilio Castillo Álvarez
- Date of birth: 26 November 1991 (age 34)
- Place of birth: La Ceiba, Honduras
- Height: 1.83 m (6 ft 0 in)
- Position: Striker

Team information
- Current team: Marathón
- Number: 79

Youth career
- 2000–2006: Interlatinos F.C.
- 2006–2008: El Sauce

Senior career*
Years	Team	Apps	(Gls)
2008–2013	Vida	66	(18)
2012	→ Deportes Savio (loan)	13	(5)
2014–2018	Motagua	154	(84)
2015–2016	→ Correcaminos UAT (loan)	19	(7)
2019	Saprissa	18	(7)
2019–2022	Tondela	1	(0)
2020–2021	→ Motagua (loan)	21	(15)
2021	→ Royal Pari (loan)	25	(10)
2022	Comunicaciones	15	(3)
2022	Deportivo Pasto	0	(0)
2023	Nantong Zhiyun	25	(8)
2024	Motagua	30	(14)
2025	Deportivo Pereira	10	(1)
2025–	Marathón	13	(8)

International career^{‡}
2015–	Honduras	35	(7)
- * Club domestic league appearances and goals as of 10 January 2026 ‡ National team caps and goals as of 16 June 2024

Román Rubilio Castillo Álvarez (born 26 November 1991) is a Honduran professional footballer who plays as a striker for Liga Nacional club Marathón and the Honduras national team.

== Club career ==
On 27 September 2008, Castillo made his professional footballing debut for Vida in the Honduran top flight. He scored his side's only goal in a 1–1 draw with Hispano. On 22 June 2012, Castillo joined Deportes Savio on loan until the end of the year. He made his debut on 30 July, starting in the opening match of the Apertura tournament, in a 3–1 loss to Olimpia. He would score his first goal for Savio the following 12 August in a 4–2 away defeat to Platense.

On 4 December 2013, Castillo signed with Motagua, after having been previously linked to Motagua and Olimpia, and as well as having a tryout with Spanish Segunda División side Real Murcia. On 4 September 2015, Castillo joined Ascenso MX club Correcaminos UAT on a year-long loan. He would make his debut for the Mexican side the following 18 September in a 2–0 away defeat against Atlante. He would score his first goal for the club a week later in the 1–0 home defeat of Venados. Castillo returned to Motagua following the end of the loan spell.

On 12 August 2018, Castillo scored the winning goal in Motagua's 1–0 victory over Real España. With this goal, he became the club's all-time top scorer with 77 goals. The goal was also his 100th in the league. After his performance following the 2018 CONCACAF League, he was nominated for Player of the Year and was also included in the Best XI at the 2018 CONCACAF Awards.

On 22 January 2019, Castillo signed with Liga FPD club Deportivo Saprissa. The signing came to fruition after Castillo failed a medical with Super League Greece club PAS Giannina and also broke a pre-contract agreement with China League One club Nantong Zhiyun. He made his league debut the following 6 February, coming off the bench in a 1–0 home win against Santos de Guápiles.

On 26 July 2019, Castillo signed with Primeira Liga club Tondela until June 2022. He made his debut the following 3 August in a 0–1 away loss to Penafiel in the Taça da Liga. He made his debut in the league, alongside fellow countryman Jonathan Toro, the following 12 August in a 0–0 draw with Vitória de Setúbal. On 31 January 2020, Castillo returned to Motagua on a year-long loan until 31 January 2021, after being unable to establish himself with Tondela. On 13 January 2021, Castillo joined Bolivian Primera División club Royal Pari on a year-long loan until 1 January 2022. Castillo and Tondela reached a mutual agreement to terminate his contract on 12 February 2022.

On 24 March 2022, free agent Castillo signed with Liga Guate club Comunicaciones. He made his debut the following 3 April, coming of the bench in a 1–0 home win against Municipal. He would score his first goal for the club on 7 April, in a 2–0 away victory against Xelajú. On 6 June, Comunicaciones announced the departure of Castillo.

On 29 June 2022, Castillo signed with Categoría Primera A club Deportivo Pasto. Castillo only made one appearance with the Colombian outfit in a friendly, and was unable to be registered by the club due to an ongoing legal issue with Nantong Zhiyun. The Chinese club was suing Castillo for unilaterally terminating his pre-contract agreement with them because he refused to undergo a medical. He was ordered to pay $218,000 (about 5.3 million lempiras) to the club as compensation for breach of contract. Castillo's contract with Deportivo Pasto was terminated after only a month at the club.

After serving a 6-month suspension from footballing activity, in February 2023, Castillo signed with Nantong Zhiyun, now playing in the Chinese Super League. He made his debut in the league on 17 April, in a 2–1 home loss to Dalian Pro. He scored his first goal the following 26 April in a match against Henan, the sole goal in a 1–0 win.

On 4 January 2024, Castillo made his second return to Motagua.

On 23 January 2025, Castillo returned to Colombia and signed with Deportivo Pereira. He made his debut the following 3 February, in a league match against Alianza FC, where he had a goal disallowed in the 0–0 draw. He would score his first goal for the club and first in Categoría Primera A on 19 February, in a 3–1 away loss to Once Caldas. On 6 August, Castillo and the club agreed to mutually terminate his contract after he had fallen out of favor with head coach Rafael Dudamel.

On 21 August 2025, Castillo returned to Honduras and signed with Marathón on a one-year deal. On 27 September, Castillo would score on his debut for the club, managing to execute a bicycle kick for his team's second in a 2–2 home draw with Victoria.

== Career statistics ==
=== Club ===
As of match played 10 January 2026

Appearances and goals by club, season and competition
Club	Season	League			National cup (Note: Includes Honduran Cup, Copa MX, Taça de Portugal, Chinese FA Cup, and Copa Colombia)		Continental		Other		Total	
Club	Season	Division	Apps	Goals	Apps	Goals	Apps	Goals	Apps	Goals	Apps	Goals
Vida	2008–09	Liga Nacional	11	1	—		—		—		11	1
Vida	2009–10	Liga Nacional	3	0	—		—		—		3	0
Vida	2010–11	Liga Nacional	10	2	—		—		—		10	2
Vida	2011–12	Liga Nacional	8	1	—		—		—		8	1
Vida	2012–13	Liga Nacional	17	2	—		—		—		17	2
Vida	2013–14	Liga Nacional	17	12	—		—		—		17	12
Vida	Total		66	18	—		—		—		66	18
Deportes Savio (loan)	2012–13	Liga Nacional	18	5	—		—		—		18	5
Motagua	2013–14	Liga Nacional	19	5	—		—		—		19	5
Motagua	2014–15	Liga Nacional	44	28	3	2	—		—		47	30
Motagua	2015–16	Liga Nacional	3	1	—		0	0	—		3	1
Motagua	2016–17	Liga Nacional	32	19	1	0	—		—		33	19
Motagua	2017–18	Liga Nacional	40	23	1	0	2	0	—		43	23
Motagua	2018–19	Liga Nacional	16	8	0	0	6	5	—		22	13
Motagua	Total		154	84	5	2	8	5	—		167	91
Correcaminos UAT (loan)	2015–16	Ascenso MX	19	7	1	0	—		—		20	7
Saprissa	2018–19	Liga FPD	18	7	—		2	0	—		20	7
Tondela	2019–20	Primeira Liga	1	0	1	0	—		1	0	3	0
Motagua (loan)	2019–20	Liga Nacional	7	5	—		2	0	—		9	5
Motagua (loan)	2020–21	Liga Nacional	14	10	—		3	0	—		17	10
Motagua (loan)	Total		21	15	—		5	0	—		26	15
Royal Pari (loan)	2021	FBF División Profesional	25	10	—		2	1	—		27	11
Comunicaciones	2021–22	Liga Nacional de Guatemala	15	3	—		—		—		15	3
Nantong Zhiyun	2023	Chinese Super League	25	8	2	1	—		—		27	9
Motagua	2023–24	Liga Nacional	13	6	—		—		—		13	6
Motagua	2024–25	Liga Nacional	17	8	—		7	2	—		24	10
Motagua	Total		30	14	—		7	2	—		37	16
Deportivo Pereira	2025	Categoría Primera A	10	1	3	2	—		—		13	3
Marathón	2025–26	Liga Nacional	12	8	—		—		—		12	8
Career total			400	173	12	5	24	8	1	0	437	186

=== International ===
As of match played 20 November 2024

National team	Year	Apps	Goals
Honduras
Honduras	2015	11	2
Honduras	2017	7	2
Honduras	2018	2	0
Honduras	2019	5	2
Honduras	2020	1	0
Honduras	2021	2	0
Honduras	2022	1	0
Honduras	2023	4	1
Honduras	2024	3	0
Total		36	7

Scores and results list Honduras' goal tally first.

No.	Date	Venue	Opponent	Score	Result	Competition
1.	6 June 2015	Estadio Defensores del Chaco, Asunción, Paraguay	Paraguay	2–1	2–2	Friendly
2.	4 September 2015	Polideportivo Cachamay, Ciudad Guayana, Venezuela	Venezuela	2–0	3–0	Friendly
3.	15 January 2017	Estadio Rommel Fernández, Panama City, Panama	El Salvador	1–1	2–1	2017 Copa Centroamericana
4.	15 January 2017	Estadio Rommel Fernández, Panama City, Panama	El Salvador	2–1	2–1	2017 Copa Centroamericana
5.	17 June 2019	Independence Park, Kingston, Jamaica	Jamaica	2–3	2–3	2019 CONCACAF Gold Cup
6.	25 June 2019	Banc of California Stadium, Los Angeles, United States	El Salvador	2–0	4–0	2019 CONCACAF Gold Cup
7.	6 June 2024	Estadio Nacional Chelato Uclés, Tegucigalpa, Honduras	Cuba	3–1	3–1	2026 FIFA World Cup qualification

== Honours ==
Motagua

- Liga Nacional: 2014 Apertura, 2016 Apertura, 2017 Clausura, 2018 Apertura, 2024 Apertura

Comunicaciones

- Liga Guate: 2022 Clausura

Individual

- CONCACAF League Golden Boot (Shared): 2018
