= José Calderón (Panamanian footballer) =

Panamanian footballer (born 1985)

Personal information
- Full name: José de Jesus Calderón Frias
- Date of birth: 14 August 1985 (age 41)
- Place of birth: Panama City, Panama
- Height: 1.87 m (6 ft 2 in)
- Position: Goalkeeper

Youth career
- Chepo

Senior career*
Years	Team	Apps	(Gls)
2003–2005	San Francisco	31	(0)
2006	Municipal Chorrillo	16	(0)
2007–2010	Chepo	80	(0)
2010–2011	Árabe Unido	29	(0)
2011–2013	Chepo	21	(0)
2013–2014	Heredia	79	(0)
2014–2015	Coatepeque	36	(0)
2015–2017	Platense	49	(0)
2017	Real Cartagena	8	(0)
2017	Marathón	14	(0)
2018	Municipal Chorrillo	10	(0)
2018–2019	Guastatoya	49	(0)
2019–2021	Comunicaciones	47	(0)
2021	Cobán Imperial	11	(0)
2022–2025	Xelajú	124	(0)
2026	San Miguelito	11	(0)

International career^{‡}
2005–2018	Panama	39	(0)
- * Club domestic league appearances and goals as of 4 January 2021 (UTC) ‡ National team caps and goals as of 4 November 2019

José de Jesus Calderón Frias (born 14 August 1985) is a Panamanian professional footballer who plays as a goalkeeper. He is currently banned from playing.

== Club career ==
He played for several teams in Panama before moving abroad to join Guatemalan side Heredia in 2012. He moved on to Coatepeque ahead of the 2014 Apertura season.

In May 2015, Calderón announced his departure from Coatepeque after the team was relegated.

== International career ==
Calderón has been one of the only members of the Panama U-20 squad who have participated in both the 2003 FIFA World Youth Cup in the United Arab Emirates and in the 2005 FIFA World Youth Cup in the Netherlands.

He made his senior debut for Panama in a friendly match against Bahrain on 27 October 2005 and has, as of 1 June 2015, earned a total of 11 caps, scoring no goals. He was selected as a reserve for the 2005, 2007 and 2009 CONCACAF Gold Cups but did not play. Calderón was also part of the team that won the 2009 UNCAF Nations Cup in Honduras.

In May 2018 he was called up as part of Panama’s preliminary 35 man squad for the 2018 FIFA World Cup in Russia, and was later named as a reserve goalkeeper in the final 23-man squad behind starter Jaime Penedo.

== Career statistics ==
=== International ===
As of 28 June 2018

Panama
Year	Apps	Goals
2005	1	0
2006	0	0
2007	2	0
2008	0	0
2009	2	0
2010	3	0
2011	0	0
2012	0	0
2013	0	0
2014	3	0
2015	4	0
2016	3	0
2017	11	0
2018	2	0
Total	31	0

== Honors ==
Guastatoya

- Liga Nacional de Guatemala: Apertura 2018

Xelajú

- Liga Nacional de Guatemala: Clausura 2023

Panama

- UNCAF Nations Cup: 2009
- CONCACAF Gold Cup runner-up: 2005; third place: 2015
