= 2017–18 F.C. Motagua season =

Motagua
2017–18 season
- Chairman: Eduardo Atala
- Manager: Diego Vásquez
- Stadium: Nacional; Carlos Miranda; Emilio Williams Agasse
- Apertura: Runners-up
- Clausura: Runners-up
- Supercup: Winners
- CONCACAF Champions League: Round of 16
- Top goalscorer: League: Castillo (23); All: Castillo (23)
Home colours	Away colours	Third colours
- All statistics correct as of 19 May 2018.

The 2017–18 season was F.C. Motagua's 71st season in existence and the club's 52nd consecutive season in the top fight of Honduran football. As winners of both Apertura and Clausura last season, the club was looking for their 16th and 17th league title. They also competed for the 2017 Honduran Supercup and the 2018 CONCACAF Champions League. No Honduran Cup competition was scheduled from the Federation this season.

== Overview ==
Coach Diego Vásquez lead the team for his 8th consecutive tournament. Due to the incidents occurred on last season's final match where four people lost their lives, the Discipline Commission decided to ban the Estadio Tiburcio Carías Andino for nine games. This implied the entire home schedule for the Apertura regular season. The penalty was later reduced to five games after an appeal. On 1 June, Brazilian superstar Ronaldinho announced in a video through his social media that he would be visiting Honduras in July to play an exhibition match between the contenders of the Honduran Superclásico. It was announced later however, that the match was changed to be played against Real C.D. España instead. Decision taken to avoid a conflict between the two Barra bravas which are known for their fierce and often dangerous rivalry. On 30 July, Ronaldinho played in front of thousands at Estadio Tiburcio Carías Andino wearing both teams' jerseys on each half. He generated the two assists that gave a historic 0–2 win to Real España. The game served also as a farewell to Amado Guevara, a club's longtime prominent figure. On 2 August, Motagua defeated C.D. Marathón 2–1 at Estadio Francisco Morazán to obtain the 2017 Honduran Supercup. On 31 December, Uruguayan newspaper Ovación selected the best clubs, the best players and the best coaches in the American leagues for 2017. For Honduras, Motagua, Román Castillo and Diego Vásquez were all chosen

Motagua started the Apertura tournament playing outside Tegucigalpa due to the suspension of their stadium because of the incidents occurred last season. On 9 September, Estadio Emilio Williams Agasse, a newly opened venue in Choluteca, hosted a league match for the first time in the 1–1 against Olimpia, in another edition of the Superclásico. On 23 November, the club finished in second position and advanced directly to the semifinals. Once in the semifinals, the club faced city neighbors Olimpia, being the 11th time in league history that these two meet at this stage. With a 3–3 aggregate score, Motagua advanced thanks to their better regular season record over Olimpia. The final series were played against Real España and the club failed in obtaining their third straight league title.

In the Clausura tournament, Motagua started with an away victory against Lobos UPNFM at Estadio Emilio Williams Agasse. Just like in the Apertura, Motagua had to play their first couple of games outside their ground; this time because of the events taking place at Estadio Tiburcio Carías Andino for the new presidential term. On 28 March, the Argentinian midfielder Santiago Vergara died from leukemia at the age of 26. After completing the 18 regular season rounds, the team finished 2nd and qualified directly to the semifinals for their 8th consecutive time and their 26th overall. In the semifinals, the team faced city neighbors Olimpia for another Honduran Superclásico meeting. Motagua, once again, managed to eliminate their bitter rivals and advanced to their 4th consecutive final for the first time in their league history. On 19 May, after a 1–1 aggregate score against C.D. Marathón, the championship had to be decided in penalty shoot-outs. Marcelo Pereira and Reinieri Mayorquín missed their chances and the club lost the title. With two finals reached in the 2017–18 season, Motagua qualified to the 2018 CONCACAF League.

== Kits ==
The 2017–18 home, away and third kits were published on 22 July.

Manufacturer		Main sponsor	
Joma		Pepsi	
Home	Away	Alternative	Goalkeeper

== Players ==
=== Transfers in ===
Player	Contract date	Moving from
(Honduras) Walter Martínez	15 June 2017	(Honduras) Marathón
(Honduras) Eddie Hernández	26 June 2017	(Colombia) Deportes Tolima
(Honduras) Deybi Flores	26 June 2017	(Canada) Vancouver Whitecaps
(Honduras) Raúl Santos	6 July 2017	(Honduras) Vida
(Argentina) Germán Mayenfisch	12 January 2018	(Argentina) Deportivo Mandiyú
(Colombia) Javier Estupiñán	16 January 2018	(Honduras) Olimpia

=== Transfers out ===
Player	Released date	Moving to
(Argentina) Santiago Vergara	28 May 2017	Hiatus
(Argentina) Martín Pucheta	19 June 2017	(Argentina) San Lorenzo
(Honduras) Irvin Reyna	29 June 2017	(Honduras) UPNFM
(Honduras) Cristian Hernández	7 July 2017	(Honduras) Valle
(Honduras) Maylor Núñez	2 January 2018	(Honduras) Valle
(Honduras) Henry Güity	2 January 2018	(Honduras) Valle
(Honduras) Eddie Hernández	8 January 2018	(Kazakhstan) Irtysh Pavlodar
(Honduras) Marlon Licona	12 January 2018	Honduras Progreso

=== Squad ===
- Statistics as of 19 May 2018
- Only league matches into account

No.	Pos.	Player name	Date of birth and age	Games played			Goals scored		
				< 16/17	17/18	Total	< 16/17	17/18	Total
1	GK	(Honduras) Harold Fonseca	8 October 1993 (aged 23)	16	7	23	0	0	0
2	DF	(Honduras) Juan Montes	26 October 1985 (aged 31)	131	43	174	8	2	10
3	DF	(Honduras) Henry Figueroa	28 December 1992 (aged 24)	129	30	159	2	1	3
5	DF	(Honduras) Marcelo Pereira	27 May 1995 (aged 22)	50	22	72	3	1	4
6	MF	(Honduras) Reinieri Mayorquín	13 July 1989 (aged 27)	110	36	146	8	2	10
7	MF	(Honduras) Carlos Discua	27 September 1984 (aged 32)	182	39	221	49	3	52
8	FW	(Honduras) Walter Martínez	26 March 1991 (aged 26)	0	37	37	0	8	8
9	FW	(Honduras) Román Castillo	26 November 1991 (aged 25)	98	40	138	53	23	76
10	MF	(Honduras) Erick Andino	21 July 1989 (aged 27)	70	26	96	25	1	26
11	FW	(Honduras) Marco Vega	14 April 1987 (aged 30)	37	33	70	8	7	15
12	MF	(Honduras) Raúl Santos	2 August 1992 (aged 24)	0	27	27	0	0	0
14	FW	(Honduras) Eddie Hernández	27 February 1991 (aged 26)	53	10	63	18	5	23
14	MF	(Argentina) Germán Mayenfisch	5 July 1993 (aged 23)	0	11	11	0	0	0
15	FW	(Honduras) Denilson Castillo	29 April 1998 (aged 19)	2	1	3	0	0	0
16	MF	(Honduras) Héctor Castellanos	28 December 1992 (aged 24)	73	35	108	1	0	1
17	MF	(Honduras) Denil Maldonado	25 May 1998 (aged 19)	4	3	7	0	0	0
18	DF	(Honduras) Wilmer Crisanto	24 June 1989 (aged 28)	132	39	171	12	4	16
19	GK	(Argentina) Jonathan Rougier	29 October 1987 (aged 29)	20	35	55	0	0	0
21	FW	(Honduras) Foslyn Grant	4 October 1998 (aged 18)	16	1	17	1	0	1
22	FW	(Colombia) Javier Estupiñán	8 February 1984 (aged 33)	0	19	19	0	4	4
23	MF	(Honduras) Deybi Flores	16 June 1996 (aged 21)	27	13	40	0	0	0
24	DF	(Honduras) Omar Elvir	28 September 1989 (aged 27)	198	22	220	8	2	10
25	GK	(Honduras) Marlon Licona	9 February 1991 (aged 26)	67	3	70	0	0	0
26	DF	(Honduras) Harrinson Bernárdez	14 May 1997 (aged 20)	3	1	4	0	0	0
27	DF	(Honduras) Félix Crisanto	9 September 1990 (aged 26)	64	35	99	5	0	5
28	MF	(Honduras) Kevin Castro	9 October 1998 (aged 18)	0	0	0	0	0	0
29	MF	(Honduras) Edgardo Meléndez	11 September 1993 (aged 23)	0	0	0	0	0	0
30	MF	(Honduras) Henry Güity	24 June 1996 (aged 21)	4	0	4	0	0	0
31	DF	(Honduras) Klifox Bernárdez	14 May 1997 (aged 20)	26	13	39	0	0	0
32	DF	(Honduras) Maylor Núñez	5 July 1996 (aged 20)	2	0	2	0	0	0
34	FW	(Honduras) Kevin López	3 February 1996 (aged 21)	69	16	85	10	2	12
35	DF	(Honduras) Cristopher Meléndez	25 November 1997 (aged 19)	7	8	15	0	0	0
Manager		(Argentina) Diego Vásquez	3 July 1971 (aged 45)	23 November 2013–					
RESERVES TEAM
No.	Pos.	Player name	Date of birth and age	Games played			Goals scored		
				< 16/17	17/18	T	< 16/17	17/18	T
36	DF	(Honduras) Roy Rodríguez	8 April 2000 (aged 17)	0	0	0	0	0	0
37	MF	(Honduras) Óscar Romero	23 February 1999 (aged 18)	0	0	0	0	0	0
38	MF	(Honduras) Marvin Ávila	9 March 2002 (aged 15)	0	0	0	0	0	0
39	FW	(Honduras) Ángel Barrios	27 October 2000 (aged 16)	0	0	0	0	0	0
40	DF	(Honduras) Melker Félix	20 June 2000 (aged 17)	0	0	0	0	0	0
41	MF	(Honduras) Jack Baptiste	20 December 1999 (aged 17)	0	7	7	0	0	0
42	DF	(Honduras) Deban López	3 October 1998 (aged 18)	0	0	0	0	0	0
43	MF	(Honduras) Mario Arguijo	31 March 1999 (aged 18)	0	0	0	0	0	0
44	DF	(Honduras) Albert Galindo	21 October 2000 (aged 16)	0	0	0	0	0	0
45	MF	(Honduras) Jessem Ortega	16 February 1999 (aged 18)	0	0	0	0	0	0
46	MF	(Honduras) Omar Canales	2 September 1999 (aged 17)	0	0	0	0	0	0
47	FW	(Honduras) Josué Villafranca	16 December 1999 (aged 17)	1	0	1	0	0	0
48	FW	(Honduras) Asaf Cacho	27 July 2000 (aged 16)	0	0	0	0	0	0
49	MF	(Honduras) Juan Gómez	3 April 2000 (aged 17)	0	0	0	0	0	0
50	MF	(Honduras) Jonathan Galo	10 February 1998 (aged 19)	0	0	0	0	0	0
51	FW	(Honduras) Erick Gonzales	23 May 2001 (aged 16)	0	0	0	0	0	0
52	MF	(Honduras) Kevin Escoto	20 June 1999 (aged 18)	0	0	0	0	0	0
53	MF	(Honduras) César Romero	19 January 1999 (aged 18)	2	1	3	0	0	0
54	MF	(Honduras) Everson López	3 November 2000 (aged 16)	0	0	0	0	0	0
55	MF	(Honduras) Bayron Varela	1 July 2000 (aged 17)	0	0	0	0	0	0
56	MF	(Honduras) Francisco Paz	14 March 2001 (aged 16)	0	0	0	0	0	0
57	MF	(Honduras) Jonathan Núñez	26 November 2001 (aged 15)	0	0	0	0	0	0
58	FW	(Honduras) Kenneth Martínez	26 February 2000 (aged 17)	0	0	0	0	0	0
59	GK	(Honduras) Axell Bonilla	10 January 2000 (aged 17)	0	0	0	0	0	0
60	GK	(Honduras) Alex Rivera	20 July 2000 (aged 16)	0	0	0	0	0	0
61	MF	(Honduras) Allan Villalta	22 October 1999 (aged 17)	0	0	0	0	0	0
62	MF	(Honduras) Fernando Castillo	18 December 2000 (aged 16)	0	0	0	0	0	0
63	MF	(Honduras) Bayron Arzú	10 February 1998 (aged 19)	0	0	0	0	0	0

=== Goalkeeper's action ===
- As of 19 May 2018

Goalkeeper	Years evaluated	Games	Goals	Per.
(Argentina) Jonathan Rougier	2017–2018	55	57	1.036
(Honduras) Harold Fonseca	2011–2015, 2016–2018	23	28	1.217
(Honduras) Marlon Licona	2010–2017	70	86	1.229
(Honduras) Wilmer Crisanto (emergent)	2018	1	1	1.000

== Results ==
All times are local CST unless stated otherwise

=== Preseason and friendlies ===
13 July 2017 Friendly	Motagua	2–0	Vida	Tela, Atlántida
	Vega; Hernández	Report		Stadium: Tío Dolmo Field
Note: F.C. Motagua played their first preseason game.

16 July 2017 Friendly	New Orleans Stars (United States)	0–0 (2–1 p)	(Honduras) Motagua	New Orleans, United States
20:00				Stadium: Behrman Stadium; Attendance: ~5,000
Note: The team New Orleans Stars is mainly composed of Honduran footballers who migrated to New Orleans.

21 July 2017 Friendly	Alajuelense (Costa Rica)	3–0	(Honduras) Motagua	Heredia, Costa Rica
19:15	Barrantes 1'; Cordero 30' (pen.); Guevara 89'	http://www.teletica.com/Deportes/168040-Alajuelense-termino-los-fogueos-con-victoria-3-0-ante-el-Motagua.note.aspx		Stadium: Estadio Eladio Rosabal Cordero; Referee: Juan Calderón (CRC) Starting XI: 21 – Rougier; 10 – Andino; 14 – Hernández; 37 – Montes; 43 – Santos; 50 – Mayorquín; 52 – Vega; 53 – Castellanos; 54 – Maldonado; 55 – Bernárdez; 61 – López
Note: This was the first F.C. Motagua's visit to Costa Rica and to Liga Deportiva Alajuelense in particular since 29 September 2011 for the 2011–12 CONCACAF Champions League.

23 July 2017 Friendly	Saprissa (Costa Rica)	2–2	(Honduras) Motagua	San José, Costa Rica
11:00	Angulo 24'; Bengtson 83'	Report	44' Andino; 47' Bernárdez	Stadium: Estadio Ricardo Saprissa Aymá; Referee: Jeffrey Solís (CRC) Starting XI: 27 – Licona; 10 – Andino; 37 – Montes; 48 – Crisanto; 50 – Mayorquín; 51 – H. Bernárdez; 52 – Vega; 53 – Castellanos; 55 – K. Bernárdez; 58 – Meléndez; 61 – López
Note: F.C. Motagua returned the visit to Deportivo Saprissa after they played in 2015 for the Copa Ciclón.

25 July 2017 Friendly	Santos de Guápiles (Costa Rica)	0–0	(Honduras) Motagua	Guápiles, Costa Rica
20:00		Report		Stadium: Estadio Ebal Rodríguez; Referee: Franklin Angulo (CRC) Starting XI: 21 – Rougier; 10 – Erick Andino; 14 – Hernández; 37 – Montes; 46 – Flores; 48 – Crisanto; 50 – Mayorquín; 51 – H. Bernárdez; 54 – Maldonado; 55 – K. Bernárdez; 61 – López
Note: This game marked the end of F.C. Motagua's trip to Costa Rica which ended with a 0–2–1 record. It was the first ever encounter against Santos de Guápiles F.C. The Estadio Ebal Rodríguez inaugurated its artificial lights this night.

28 July 2017 Friendly	León Libertador	1–9	Motagua	Choluteca, Choluteca
19:00	undisclosed	Report	Castillo; Andino; Hernández; Vega; López (?) undisclosed	Stadium: Cancha La Libertad
Note: This game served as the first match played over the newly installed artificial grass.

30 July 2017 Friendly	Motagua	0–2	Real España	Tegucigalpa, Francisco Morazán
16:00		Report	55' Cardozo; 74' Tejeda	Stadium: Estadio Tiburcio Carías Andino; Referee: Óscar Moncada Starting XI: 19 – Rougier (substituted off) 46'; 2 – Montes (substituted off) 79'; 5 – Pereira; 7 – Discua (substituted off) 66'; 10 – Ronaldinho (substituted off) 44'; 11 – Vega (substituted off) 60'; 16 – Castellanos (substituted off) 79'; 20 – Guevara (substituted off) 40'; 21 – Andino (substituted off) 60'; 27 – F. Crisanto; 31 – Bernárdez; Substitutes; 6 – Mayorquín (substituted on) 40'; 34 – López (substituted on) 44'; 25 – Licona (substituted on) 46'; 8 – Martínez (substituted on) 60'; 14 – Hernández (substituted on) 60'; 18 – W. Crisanto (substituted on) 66'; 23 – Flores (substituted on) 79'; 17 – Maldonado (substituted on) 79'
Note: Superstar Ronaldinho played in Honduras for the first time in a match so-called 'Partido por La Paz' (Game for peace). Midfielder Amado Guevara, who retired in 2015 also took part.

13 January 2018 Friendly	Broncos del Sur	0–1	Motagua	Choluteca, Choluteca
15:00		Report	20' Discua	Stadium: Estadio Emilio Williams Agasse; Referee: Starting XI: 25 – Licona; 2 – Montes; 3 – Figueroa; 6 – Mayorquín; 7 – Discua; 9 – Castillo; 10 – Andino; 16 – Castellanos; 27 – Crisanto; 31 – Bernárdez; 34 – López
Note: This was F.C. Motagua's first and only practicing match before the start of the Clausura tournament. These two teams haven't face since 6 May 2001 (0–0) for the 2000–01 season.

24 February 2018 Friendly	Rio Grande Valley (United States)	2–5	(Honduras) Motagua	Edinburg, United States
19:00	20'; Garza 37'	Report	4' López; 10' Mayenfisch; 13' Vega; 64' Discua; 69' Castillo	Stadium: H-E-B Park; Referee: Starting XI: 1 – Fonseca; 10 – Andino; 11 – Vega; 12 – Santos; 14 – Mayenfisch; 17 – Maldonado; 18 – W. Crisanto; 22 – Estupiñán; 24 – Elvir; 31 – Bernárdez; 34 – López; Substitutes; 8 – Martínez (substituted on); 5 – Pereira (substituted on); 9 – Castillo (substituted on); 6 – Mayorquín (substituted on); 2 – Montes (substituted on); 27 – F. Crisanto (substituted on); 7 – Discua (substituted on)
Note: Rio Grande Valley FC Toros plays in the United Soccer League. The match served as preparation for F.C. Motagua's contention at the 2018 CONCACAF Champions League.

=== Apertura ===
6 August 2017 Week 1	Motagua	1–1	Real Sociedad	Comayagua, Comayagua
15:00	Martínez 88'	Report	53' Martínez	Stadium: Estadio Carlos Miranda; Attendance: 3,228; Referee: Melvin Matamoros Starting XI: 19 – Rougier; 2 – Montes; 3 – Figueroa; 5 – Pereira (substituted off) 56'; 6 – Mayorquín (substituted off) 64'; 7 – Discua; 10 – Andino (substituted off) 71'; 11 – Vega; 23 – Flores; 27 – F. Crisanto; 31 – Bernárdez; Substitutes; 18 – W. Crisanto (substituted on) 56'; 9 – Castillo (substituted on) 64'; 8 – Martínez (substituted on) 71'
Note: Midfielder Walter Martínez made his debut scoring the only goal for F.C. Motagua this afternoon. Román Castillo returned after his injury last season. This marks the first game for Motagua outside Tegucigalpa due to the 5-game suspension of their stadium because of the incidents last season.

13 August 2017 Week 2	Juticalpa	2–2	Motagua	Juticalpa, Olancho
14:00	Lanza 6'; Ocampo 85'	Report	68' Figueroa; 89' Vega	Stadium: Estadio Juan Ramón Brevé Vargas; Attendance: 4,045; Referee: Ángel Cruz Starting XI: 19 – Rougier; 2 – Montes; 3 – Figueroa; 6 – Mayorquín (substituted off) 46'; 7 – Discua; 10 – Andino; 14 – Hernández; 18 – W. Crisanto (substituted off) 75'; 23 – Flores; 27 – F. Crisanto (substituted off) 46'; 31 – Bernárdez; Substitutes; 11 – Vega (substituted on) 46'; 12 – Santos (substituted on) 46'; 8 – Martínez (substituted on) 75'
Note: Defender Raúl Santos made his debut for F.C. Motagua. Henry Figueroa scored his third goal for Motagua and his first one since 20 November 2014.

2 September 2017 Week 3	Motagua	1–0	Marathón	Comayagua, Comayagua
18:00	Vega 44'	Report		Stadium: Estadio Carlos Miranda; Attendance: 2,695; Referee: Nelson Salgado Starting XI: 19 – Rougier; 2 – Montes; 5 – Pereira; 6 – Mayorquín (substituted off) 26'; 8 – Martínez (substituted off) 70'; 9 – Castillo; 10 – Andino; 11 – Vega (substituted off) 90'; 12 – Santos; 16 – Castellanos; 31 – Bernárdez; Substitutes; 18 – Crisanto (substituted on) 26'; 23 – Flores (substituted on) 70'; 21 – Grant (substituted on) 90'
Note: The game was rescheduled from 20 August due to a referees' strike. F.C. Motagua defeated C.D. Marathón exactly one month after their win at the 2017 Honduran Supercup. With the win, Motagua reached the top of the standings for the first time since week 6 in the Apertura 2016.

26 August 2017 Week 4	Honduras Progreso	2–3	Motagua	El Progreso, Yoro
19:15	Martínez 4'; Delgado 28'	Report	37' Andino; 59' Castillo; 61' Mayorquín	Stadium: Estadio Humberto Micheletti; Attendance: 1,159; Referee: Óscar Moncada Starting XI: 19 – Rougier; 2 – Montes; 3 – Figueroa; 5 – Pereira (substituted off) 34'; 6 – Mayorquín; 7 – Discua; 10 – Andino (substituted off) 77'; 11 – Vega; 23 – Flores (substituted off) 46'; 27 – Crisanto; 31 – Bernárdez; Substitutes; 9 – Castillo (substituted on) 34'; 16 – Castellanos (substituted on) 46'; 12 – Santos (substituted on) 77'
Note: F.C. Motagua hasn't lost to C.D. Honduras Progreso since 30 August 2015 (4–1 at El Progreso); since then the record stands as 8–4–0. In this game, striker Román Castillo reached 100 appearances wearing the Motagua's jersey.

9 September 2017 Week 5	Motagua	1–1	Olimpia	Choluteca, Choluteca
18:00	Castillo 42'	Report	3' Costly	Stadium: Estadio Emilio Williams Agasse; Attendance: 5,545; Referee: Melvin Matamoros Starting XI: 19 – Rougier; 2 – Montes; 5 – Pereira; 6 – Mayorquín; 7 – Discua; 9 – Castillo (substituted off) 66'; 10 – Andino (substituted off) 75'; 11 – Vega (substituted off) 85'; 16 – Castellanos; 27 – F. Crisanto; 31 – Bernárdez; Substitutes; 14 – Hernández (substituted on) 66'; 8 – Martínez (substituted on) 75'; 18 – W. Crisanto (substituted on) 85'
Note: Estadio Emilio Williams Agasse hosted a Liga Nacional match for the first time. It was also the 8th time in history the Honduran Superclásico was played outside Tegucigalpa. Furthermore, the score 1–1 became the most repeated result between these two with 43 times.

14 September 2017 Week 6	Motagua	0–0	Vida	Comayagua, Comayagua
19:00		Report		Stadium: Estadio Carlos Miranda; Attendance: 1,487; Referee: Armando Castro Starting XI: 19 – Rougier; 2 – Montes; 3 – Figueroa; 6 – Mayorquín (substituted off) 46'; 7 – Discua; 9 – Castillo; 10 – Andino (substituted off) 63'; 16 – Castellanos; 18 – W. Crisanto (substituted off) 71'; 31 – Bernárdez; 35 – Meléndez; Substitutes; 11 – Vega (substituted on) 46'; 8 – Martínez (substituted on) 63'; 27 – F. Crisanto (substituted on) 71'
Note: This result marked the first scoreless game for F.C. Motagua since their 4–0 away loss against C.D. Real Sociedad on 19 February 2017.

17 September 2017 Week 7	Motagua	2–1	Real España	Comayagua, Comayagua
16:00	Hernández 66'; Crisanto 86'	Report	18' Benavídez	Stadium: Estadio Carlos Miranda; Attendance: 3,744; Referee: Orlando Hernández Starting XI: 19 – Rougier; 2 – Montes; 3 – Figueroa; 6 – Mayorquín (substituted off) 46'; 7 – Discua; 9 – Castillo; 10 – Andino (substituted off) 46'; 11 – Vega (substituted off) 65'; 16 – Castellanos; 27 – F. Crisanto; 31 – Bernárdez; Substitutes; 8 – Martínez (substituted on) 46'; 18 – W. Crisanto (substituted on) 46'; 14 – Hernández (substituted on) 65'
Note: With the win, F.C. Motagua reached 21 unbeaten league games, matching up with the third longest streak obtained between 1998 and 1999 (12–9–0). This game also represents the last match playing outside Tegucigalpa after complying with the punishment imposed by the league.

24 September 2017 Week 8	Platense	4–3	Motagua	Puerto Cortés, Cortés
15:00	Hay 66'; Castillo 80'; Aguilar 88'; Figueroa 90'	Report	16' 56' Hernández; 58' Castillo	Stadium: Estadio Excélsior; Attendance: 1,695; Referee: Erick Andino Starting XI: 19 – Rougier; 2 – Montes; 3 – Figueroa; 5 – Pereira; 7 – Discua (substituted off) 75'; 8 – Martínez (substituted off) 59'; 9 – Castillo; 14 – Hernández (substituted off) 68'; 16 – Castellanos; 27 – Crisanto; 31 – Bernárdez; Substitutes; 23 – Flores (substituted on) 59'; 11 – Vega (substituted on) 68'; 10 – Andino (substituted on) 75'
Note: Jorge Lozano, a former F.C. Motagua player, made his debut as a coach in the league with Platense F.C. as interim. Motagua burned out a 3-goal advantage. It was the first defeat since 19 February 2017, losing an unbeaten streak of 21 games, the club's third longest.

27 September 2017 Week 9	Motagua	1–1	UPNFM	Tegucigalpa, Francisco Morazán
19:00	Hernández 65'	Report	73' Róchez	Stadium: Estadio Tiburcio Carías Andino; Attendance: 2,912; Referee: José Zelaya Starting XI: 19 – Rougier (substituted off) 46'; 2 – Montes; 3 – Figueroa; 5 – Pereira; 7 – Discua; 8 – Martínez (substituted off) 46'; 9 – Castillo; 14 – Hernández; 16 – Castellanos; 18 – W. Crisanto (substituted off) 75'; 31 – Bernárdez; Substitutes; 25 – Licona (substituted on) 46'; 10 – Andino (substituted on) 46'; 27 – F. Crisanto (substituted on) 75'
Note: This was F.C. Motagua's first home game at Tegucigalpa since 28 May 2017 and the first ever encounter against Lobos UPNFM.

1 October 2017 Week 10	Real Sociedad	0–2	Motagua	Tocoa, Colón
14:00		Report	7' Castillo; 37' Vega	Stadium: Estadio Francisco Martínez Durón; Attendance: 1,133; Referee: Héctor Rodríguez Starting XI: 25 – Licona; 5 – Pereira; 6 – Mayorquín; 9 – Castillo; 10 – Andino (substituted off) 63'; 11 – Vega (substituted off) 70'; 12 – Santos; 16 – Castellanos; 18 – Crisanto (substituted off) 82'; 31 – K. Bernárdez; 35 – Meléndez; Substitutes; 8 – Martínez (substituted on) 63'; 24 – Elvir (substituted on) 70'; 38 – H. Bernárdez (substituted on) 82'
Note: After 11 unsuccessful attempts, F.C. Motagua were finally able to obtain a victory at Estadio Francisco Martínez Durón for the first time since C.D. Real Sociedad's promotion in 2012. Motagua had 4 players called out for the Honduras national football team and finished this game with 9 men after two players were ejected. Left winger Omar Elvir reappeared after his injury last May. Defender Harrinson Bernárdez reappeared since 29 October 2016.

15 October 2017 Week 11	Motagua	3–2	Juticalpa	Tegucigalpa, Francisco Morazán
16:00	Elvir 10'; Hernández 30'; Vega 90+4'	Report	34' Padilla; 90+5' (o.g.) Elvir	Stadium: Estadio Tiburcio Carías Andino; Attendance: 4,467; Referee: Nelson Salgado Starting XI: 19 – Rougier; 2 – Montes; 5 – Pereira (substituted off) 86'; 7 – Discua; 9 – Castillo; 12 – Santos; 14 – Hernández (substituted off) 74'; 18 – W. Crisanto (substituted off) 74'; 23 – Flores; 24 – Elvir; 27 – F. Crisanto; Substitutes; 11 – Vega (substituted on) 74'; 35 – Meléndez (substituted on) 74'; 17 – Maldonado (substituted on) 86'
Note: F.C. Motagua returned to action after a 2-week break due to the World Cup qualifying matches. Defender Omar Elvir scored for and against his club. Youngster Denil Maldonado appeared for the first time this season substituting injured Marcelo Pereira. With the win, Motagua improved to second position.

21 October 2017 Week 12	Marathón	1–2	Motagua	San Pedro Sula, Cortés
15:30	Arboleda 45+5' (pen.)	Report	80' Castillo; 90' Crisanto	Stadium: Estadio Yankel Rosenthal; Attendance: 4,104; Referee: Óscar Moncada Starting XI: 19 – Rougier; 2 – Montes; 3 – Figueroa; 7 – Discua; 9 – Castillo; 12 – Santos (substituted off) 46'; 14 – Hernández (substituted off) 17'; 16 – Castellanos (substituted off) 76'; 18 – W. Crisanto; 24 – Elvir; 27 – F. Crisanto; Substitutes; 8 – Martínez (substituted on) 17'; 11 – Vega (substituted on) 46'; 23 – Flores (substituted on) 76'
Note: Left winger Omar Elvir reached 200 league appearances with F.C. Motagua. Forward Eddie Hernández suffered a cheekbone fracture and is expected to be out of action for one month. This marked the first time in league history that Motagua defeated C.D. Marathón in four consecutive games.

26 October 2017 Week 13	Motagua	1–0	Honduras Progreso	Tegucigalpa, Francisco Morazán
19:00	Castillo 6'	Report		Stadium: Estadio Tiburcio Carías Andino; Attendance: 2,377; Referee: Saíd Martínez Starting XI: 19 – Rougier; 2 – Montes; 3 – Figueroa; 6 – Mayorquín (substituted off) 88'; 7 – Discua (substituted off) 77'; 9 – Castillo; 11 – Vega; 16 – Castellanos; 18 – W. Crisanto (substituted off) 81'; 24 – Elvir; 27 – F. Crisanto; Substitutes; 8 – Martínez (substituted on) 77'; 34 – López (substituted on) 81'; 23 – Flores (substituted on) 88'
Note: This fourth straight win allowed F.C. Motagua to keep the first position in the standings. Forward Kevin López made his season's debut.

29 October 2017 Week 14	Olimpia	0–0	Motagua	Tegucigalpa, Francisco Morazán
16:00		Report		Stadium: Estadio Tiburcio Carías Andino; Attendance: 9,224; Referee: Armando Castro Starting XI: 19 – Rougier; 2 – Montes; 3 – Figueroa; 6 – Mayorquín (substituted off) 86'; 7 – Discua (substituted off) 90'; 9 – Castillo; 11 – Vega; 16 – Castellanos; 18 – W. Crisanto (substituted off) 89'; 24 – Elvir; 27 – F. Crisanto; Substitutes; 23 – Flores (substituted on) 86'; 34 – López (substituted on) 89'; 8 – Martínez (substituted on) 90'
Note: With the scoreless tie, the 0–0 (along with 1–1) became the most repeated result in the Honduran Superclásico with 43 times. Additionally, this was the fifth time in a row these two finished leveled, establishing a new record. The game was stained with controversy as the assistant referee disallowed a goal for Motagua due to a questionable foul in the area.

5 November 2017 Week 15	Vida	2–1	Motagua	La Ceiba, Atlántida
15:00	Palacios 51'; Moncada 64'	Report	42' Discua	Stadium: Estadio Nilmo Edwards; Attendance: 3,082; Referee: Ángel Cruz Starting XI: 19 – Rougier; 2 – Montes; 6 – Mayorquín (substituted off) 68'; 7 – Discua; 9 – Castillo; 12 – Santos; 16 – Castellanos; 18 – Crisanto; 24 – Elvir; 31 – Bernárdez (substituted off) 78'; 35 – Meléndez; Substitutes; 34 – López (substituted on) 68'; 8 – Martínez (substituted on) 78'
Note: Carlos Discua scored his first goal of the season, and his first one since 28 May 2017 reaching a total of 50 goals with F.C. Motagua. With the defeat, the club lost the opportunity to stay at the top of the standings.

18 November 2017 Week 16	Real España	3–2	Motagua	San Pedro Sula, Cortés
19:00	Altamirano 10'; Delgado 55'; Vuelto 67' (pen.)	Report	7' 74' Castillo	Stadium: Estadio Olímpico Metropolitano; Attendance: 2,540; Referee: Héctor Rodríguez Starting XI: 19 – Rougier; 2 – Montes; 6 – Mayorquín (substituted off) 69'; 7 – Discua; 9 – Castillo; 11 – Vega (substituted off) 59'; 12 – Santos; 16 – Castellanos; 18 – Crisanto; 24 – Elvir; 35 – Meléndez; Substitutes; 8 – Martínez (substituted on) 59'; 34 – López (substituted on) 69'
Note: The game was originally scheduled to be played on 9 November but Real C.D. España requested to postpone due to some repairs being performed at Estadio Francisco Morazán. It was the first game for F.C. Motagua at Estadio Olímpico Metropolitano since November 2014. Forward Román Castillo scored his first double since April 2017.

12 November 2017 Week 17	Motagua	5–1	Platense	Tegucigalpa, Francisco Morazán
16:00	Vega 31'; Crisanto 45+1' (pen.); Martínez 50' 53'; Castillo 90'	Report	63' Álvarez	Stadium: Estadio Tiburcio Carías Andino; Attendance: 2,929; Referee: Nelson Salgado Starting XI: 19 – Rougier; 2 – Montes; 6 – Mayorquín (substituted off) 76'; 8 – Martínez (substituted off) 87'; 9 – R. Castillo; 11 – Vega; 12 – Santos; 16 – Castellanos; 18 – Crisanto (substituted off) 86'; 24 – Elvir; 35 – Meléndez; Substitutes; 23 – Flores (substituted on) 76'; 34 – López (substituted on) 86'; 15 – D. Castillo (substituted on) 87'
Note: With the win, F.C. Motagua improved to second position. They also finished unbeaten at home in the regular season with 5 wins and 4 draws. Midfielder Walter Martínez scored his first double for the club. They also scored 5+ goals again since November 2015 (7–1 v Real C.D. España).

23 November 2017 Week 18	UPNFM	0–1	Motagua	Comayagua, Comayagua
19:00		Report	52' Elvir	Stadium: Estadio Carlos Miranda; Attendance: 2,631; Referee: Saíd Martínez Starting XI: 19 – Rougier; 2 – Montes; 3 – Figueroa; 7 – Discua; 8 – Martínez (substituted off) 71'; 9 – Castillo (substituted off) 83'; 11 – Vega; 16 – Castellanos; 18 – W. Crisanto (substituted off) 86'; 24 – Elvir; 27 – F. Crisanto; Substitutes; 23 – Flores (substituted on) 71'; 14 – Hernández (substituted on) 83'; 34 – López (substituted on) 86'
Note: With the win, F.C. Motagua finished second place in the regular season for their 20th time. They also clinched direct qualification to the semifinals. This game was played three days prior the 2017 elections.

20 December 2017 Semifinals	Olimpia	2–0	Motagua	Tegucigalpa, Francisco Morazán
15:00	Estupiñán 79'; López 90+5' (pen.)	Report		Stadium: Estadio Tiburcio Carías Andino; Attendance: Closed gates Referee: Saíd Martínez Starting XI: 19 – Rougier; 2 – Montes; 3 – Figueroa; 6 – Mayorquín (substituted off) 46'; 7 – Discua (substituted off) 82'; 11 – Vega; 14 – Hernández; 16 – Castellanos; 18 – W. Crisanto (substituted off) 69'; 24 – Elvir; 27 – F. Crisanto; Substitutes; 23 – Flores (substituted on) 46'; 34 – López (substituted on) 69'; 8 – Martínez (substituted on) 82'
Note: F.C. Motagua and Club Deportivo Olimpia will face in this stage for their 11th time, having Motagua advanced in six from the previous ten. The match was scheduled to be played on 14 December, however, it was suspended due to the violent incidents occurred in the other semifinal between Real C.D. España and C.D. Marathón. The National Police Department informed that there was a lack of security guarantees. The game was finally played on 20 December on closed doors, an unprecedented fact in this derby. The club played after 27 days of inactivity due to the political crisis that sequel from the 2017 presidential elections.

23 December 2017 Semifinals	Motagua	3–1	Olimpia	Tegucigalpa, Francisco Morazán
15:00	Vega 48'; Castillo 55' 74'	Report	3' Velásquez	Stadium: Estadio Tiburcio Carías Andino; Attendance: Closed gates Referee: Melvin Matamoros Starting XI: 19 – Rougier; 2 – Montes; 3 – Figueroa; 5 – Pereira (substituted off) 21'; 7 – Discua; 8 – Martínez (substituted off) 46'; 9 – Castillo; 11 – Vega; 16 – Castellanos; 18 – W. Crisanto (substituted off) 46'; 24 – Elvir; Substitutes; 27 – F. Crisanto (substituted on) 21'; 34 – López (substituted on) 46'; 6 – Mayorquín (substituted on) 46'
Note: With a 3–3 aggregated score, F.C. Motagua advanced to their third straight final thanks to their better regular season record. Motagua recovered from a 0–3 disadvantage in aggregate to score three unanswered goals in the last 45 minutes of play.

27 December 2017 Final	Real España	2–0	Motagua	San Pedro Sula, Cortés
17:30	Vuelto 36' 76'	Report		Stadium: Estadio Olímpico Metropolitano; Attendance: 8,192; Referee: Héctor Rodríguez Starting XI: 19 – Rougier; 2 – Montes; 3 – Figueroa; 6 – Mayorquín (substituted off) 64'; 7 – Discua; 9 – Castillo; 16 – Castellanos; 24 – Elvir; 27 – F. Crisanto; 31 – Bernárdez (substituted off) 46'; 34 – López (substituted off) 82'; Substitutes; 11 – Vega (substituted on) 46'; 23 – Flores (substituted on) 64'; 18 – W. Crisanto (substituted on) 82'
Note: F.C. Motagua and Real C.D. España will play their 7th final in history, having won three each in the previous six. Real España requested to play at Estadio Francisco Morazán but this stadium was suspended due to the riots occurred in the semifinals. Darixon Vuelto scored twice to give Real España a two goals advantage in the first leg.

30 December 2017 Final	Motagua	2–1 (a.e.t.)	Real España	Tegucigalpa, Francisco Morazán
16:00	Castillo 62' 73' (pen.)	Report	108' Tejeda	Stadium: Estadio Tiburcio Carías Andino; Attendance: 13,052; Referee: Saíd Martínez Starting XI: 25 – Licona; 2 – Montes; 3 – Figueroa; 6 – Mayorquín (substituted off) 46'; 7 – Discua; 9 – Castillo; 11 – Vega (substituted off) 46'; 16 – Castellanos; 18 – W. Crisanto (substituted off) 60'; 24 – Elvir; 27 – F. Crisanto; Substitutes; 14 – Hernández (substituted on) 46'; 8 – Martínez (substituted on) 46'; 34 – López (substituted on) 60'
Note: This was the first time in league history that a tournament concluded one day before New Year's Eve. With a 3–2 aggregate score, Real C.D. España defeated F.C. Motagua. Forward Román Castillo scored twice to finish as the tournament's top goalscorer with 13 goals.

=== Clausura ===
21 January 2018 Week 1	UPNFM	1–2	Motagua	Choluteca, Choluteca
15:00	Róchez 90'	Report	37' Vega; 85' Estupiñán	Stadium: Estadio Emilio Williams Agasse; Attendance: 3,911; Referee: Melvin Matamoros Starting XI: 1 – Fonseca; 2 – Montes; 5 – Pereira; 7 – Discua; 9 – Castillo (substituted off) 81'; 10 – Andino (substituted off) 63'; 11 – Vega; 12 – Santos; 16 – Castellanos; 18 – W. Crisanto (substituted off) 79'; 27 – F. Crisanto; Substitutes; 6 – Mayorquín (substituted on) 63'; 14 – Mayenfisch (substituted on) 79'; 22 – Estupiñán (substituted on) 81'
Note: F.C. Motagua played their first Clausura game after just three weeks of rest from the previous tournament. It was their second official game at Estadio Emilio Williams Agasse in history. After 13 months of inactivity due to a long injury, goalkeeper Harold Fonseca reappeared in the initial lineup. Midfielder Germán Mayenfisch and forward Javier Estupiñán made their official debut with the club; this last one scoring a goal.

24 January 2018 Week 2	Motagua	2–0	Real Sociedad	Choluteca, Choluteca
19:00	Peña 76' (o.g.); Castillo 78'	Report		Stadium: Estadio Emilio Williams Agasse; Attendance: 5,277; Referee: Nelson Salgado Starting XI: 1 – Fonseca; 2 – Montes; 3 – Figueroa; 7 – Discua; 9 – Castillo; 10 – Andino (substituted off) 65'; 11 – Vega (substituted off) 58'; 12 – Santos; 16 – Castellanos; 18 – W. Crisanto (substituted off) 76'; 27 – F. Crisanto; Substitutes; 22 – Estupiñán (substituted on) 58'; 14 – Mayenfisch (substituted on) 65'; 8 – Martínez (substituted on) 73'
Note: With the second straight win, the club stays at the top of the standings. F.C. Motagua was favored with an own goal again since 11 March 2015, curiously also against C.D. Real Sociedad. Also, with this result, Motagua leveled the all-time series against Real Sociedad with a 9–7–9 balance.

27 January 2018 Week 3	Real España	0–0	Motagua	San Pedro Sula, Cortés
19:00		Report		Stadium: Estadio Francisco Morazán; Attendance: 1,965; Referee: Raúl Castro Starting XI: 19 – Rougier; 2 – Montes; 3 – Figueroa; 6 – Mayorquín; 7 – Discua; 9 – Castillo (substituted off) 71'; 11 – Vega (substituted off) 60'; 12 – Santos; 14 – Mayenfisch (substituted off) 63'; 16 – Castellanos; 27 – F. Crisanto; Substitutes; 22 – Estupiñán (substituted on) 60'; 18 – W. Crisanto (substituted on) 63'; 5 – Pereira (substituted on) 71'
Note: These two teams faced again after 28 days of their last encounter at the Apertura finals. F.C. Motagua achieved their second straight clean sheet. Diego Vásquez coached his 200th game with the club, this number includes all competitions.

31 January 2018 Week 4	Motagua	3–0	Honduras Progreso	Tegucigalpa, Francisco Morazán
19:00	Pereira 29'; Castillo 57'; Estupiñán 81'	Report		Stadium: Estadio Tiburcio Carías Andino; Attendance: 2,130; Referee: Marlon Díaz Starting XI: 19 – Rougier; 2 – Montes; 5 – Pereira; 7 – Discua; 8 – Martínez (substituted off) 66'; 9 – Castillo (substituted off) 61'; 10 – Andino; 12 – Santos; 14 – Mayenfisch (substituted off) 58'; 16 – Castellanos; 27 – F. Crisanto; Substitutes; 18 – W. Crisanto (substituted on) 58'; 22 – Estupiñán (substituted on) 61'; 6 – Mayorquín (substituted on) 66'
Note: Defender Marcelo Pereira scored his first goal since April 2017. In four games, F.C. Motagua has only received one goal and this represented their third straight clean sheet.

4 February 2018 Week 5	Olimpia	1–1	Motagua	Tegucigalpa, Francisco Morazán
16:00	Velásquez 28' (pen.)	Report	70' Estupiñán	Stadium: Estadio Tiburcio Carías Andino; Attendance: 7,250; Referee: Melvin Matamoros Starting XI: 1 – Fonseca; 2 – Montes; 5 – Pereira; 7 – Discua; 8 – Martínez (substituted off) 46'; 9 – Castillo; 10 – Andino (substituted off) 55'; 12 – Santos; 14 – Mayenfisch (substituted off) 46'; 16 – Castellanos; 27 – F. Crisanto; Substitutes; 18 – W. Crisanto (substituted on) 46'; 6 – Mayorquín (substituted on) 46'; 22 – Estupiñán (substituted on) 55'
Note: The score 1–1 became the most repeated result (44) in the history of the Honduran Superclásico. Forward Javier Estupiñán scored the equalizer for F.C. Motagua against his previous club. The Colombian also became the seventh player to score for both clubs in the history of this derby.

7 February 2018 Week 6	Platense	3–3	Motagua	Puerto Cortés, Cortés
19:15	Hay 13' 86'; Martínez 30'	Report	29' Discua; (penalty missed) Crisanto; 52' Martínez; 70' Montes	Stadium: Estadio Excélsior; Attendance: 2,271; Referee: Orlando Hernández Starting XI: 1 – Fonseca; 2 – Montes; 5 – Pereira; 6 – Mayorquín (substituted off) 46'; 7 – Discua; 11 – Vega (substituted off) 46'; 12 – Santos; 16 – Castellanos; 18 – W. Crisanto (substituted off) 70'; 22 – Estupiñán; 27 – F. Crisanto; Substitutes; 10 – Andino (substituted on) 46'; 8 – Martínez (substituted on) 46'; 34 – López (substituted on) 70'
Note: In a rainy night, F.C. Motagua was unable to obtain a victory at Estadio Excélsior, this was the fourth consecutive win-less visit at this venue. Right winger Wilmer Crisanto missed a penalty kick in the second half. Defender Juan Montes scored his first goal of the season.

11 February 2018 Week 7	Motagua	3–0	Marathón	Tegucigalpa, Francisco Morazán
16:00	Martínez 21'; Castillo 37' 73' (pen.)	Report		Stadium: Estadio Tiburcio Carías Andino; Attendance: 4,223; Referee: Erick Andino Starting XI: 19 – Rougier; 2 – Montes; 3 – Figueroa; 7 – Discua (substituted off) 63'; 8 – Martínez (substituted off); 9 – Castillo; 10 – Andino (substituted off); 12 – Santos; 16 – Castellanos; 18 – W. Crisanto; 27 – F. Crisanto; Substitutes; 6 – Mayorquín (substituted on) 63'; 14 – Mayenfisch (substituted on); 22 – Estupiñán (substituted on)
Note: After his double, Román Castillo reached 70 goals playing for F.C. Motagua, he converted a penalty kick in a Panenka style. This was the club's first home game playing on a Sunday afternoon this year, which is their most traditional schedule.

14 February 2018 Week 8	Juticalpa	0–1	Motagua	Juticalpa, Olancho
19:00		Report	14' Martínez	Stadium: Estadio Juan Ramón Brevé Vargas; Referee: Nelson Salgado Starting XI: 19 – Rougier; 2 – Montes; 3 – Figueroa; 6 – Mayorquín; 8 – Martínez (substituted off) 72'; 9 – Castillo; 12 – Santos; 16 – Castellanos; 18 – W. Crisanto (substituted off) 75'; 27 – F. Crisanto; 53 – Romero (substituted off) 54'; Substitutes; 10 – Andino (substituted on) 54'; 22 – Estupiñán (substituted on) 72'; 34 – López (substituted on) 75'
Note: With the win, F.C. Motagua raised to the top of the standings. Midfielder César Romero reappeared in the lineups since February 2017. Midfielder Héctor Castellanos arrived to his 100th appearance with the team. This also marked the second all-time victory at this venue, and the first one since September 2015.

17 February 2018 Week 9	Motagua	1–0	Vida	Tegucigalpa, Francisco Morazán
19:00	Castillo 2'	Report		Stadium: Estadio Tiburcio Carías Andino; Referee: Armando Castro Starting XI: 1 – Fonseca; 2 – Montes; 3 – Figueroa; 8 – Martínez (substituted off) 67'; 9 – Castillo (substituted off) 72'; 10 – Andino (substituted off) 58'; 12 – Santos; 16 – Castellanos; 18 – W. Crisanto; 27 – F. Crisanto; 41 – Baptiste; Substitutes; 22 – Estupiñán (substituted on) 58'; 14 – Mayenfisch (substituted on) 67'; 11 – Vega (substituted on) 72'
Note: F.C. Motagua obtained a victory in their last domestic game before their participation at the 2018 CONCACAF Champions League. In this game, midfielder Jack Baptiste made his professional debut with the club highlighting his first assistance. The team also accomplished their 6th match in the tournament with a clean sheet.

7 March 2018 Week 10	Motagua	2–0	UPNFM	Tegucigalpa, Francisco Morazán
19:00	Estupiñán 34'; López 77'	Report		Stadium: Estadio Tiburcio Carías Andino; Referee: Nelson Salgado Starting XI: 19 – Rougier; 2 – Montes; 5 – Pereira; 7 – Discua (substituted off) 69'; 11 – Vega; 12 – Santos; 17 – Maldonado; 18 – Crisanto (substituted off) 66'; 22 – Estupiñán; 24 – Elvir (substituted off) 33'; 41 – Baptiste; Substitutes; 6 – Mayorquín (substituted on) 33'; 34 – López (substituted on) 66'; 8 – Martínez (substituted on) 69'
Note: This game was rescheduled from 25 February as F.C. Motagua was participating in the 2018 CONCACAF Champions League. Goalkeeper Jonathan Rougier won his 5th clean sheet this tournament.

4 March 2018 Week 11	Real Sociedad	2–2	Motagua	Tocoa, Colón
14:00	Peña 70'; Riascos 77'	Report	49' Castillo; 90+1' López	Stadium: Estadio Francisco Martínez Durón; Referee: Raúl Castro Starting XI: 1 – Fonseca; 2 – Montes; 5 – Pereira; 7 – Discua; 8 – Martínez (substituted off) 46'; 12 – Santos; 18 – Crisanto (substituted off) 64'; 22 – Estupiñán; 24 – Elvir; 35 – Meléndez; 41 – Baptiste (substituted off) 46'; Substitutes; 9 – Castillo (substituted on) 46'; 6 – Mayorquín (substituted on) 46'; 34 – López (substituted on) 64'
Note: Forward Román Castillo scored his 72nd goal with F.C. Motagua and tied Amado Guevara's record as the second all-time scorers.

10 March 2018 Week 12	Motagua	1–2	Real España	Choluteca, Choluteca
19:00	Castillo 20'	Report	41' (pen.) 77' Martínez	Stadium: Estadio Emilio Williams Agasse; Referee: Armando Castro Starting XI: 19 – Rougier; 2 – Montes; 5 – Pereira; 7 – Discua; 8 – Martínez (substituted off) 77'; 9 – Castillo; 10 – Andino (substituted off) 86'; 12 – Santos; 18 – W. Crisanto (substituted off) 81'; 27 – F. Crisanto; 31 – Bernárdez; Substitutes; 22 – Estupiñán (substituted on) 77'; 14 – Mayenfisch (substituted on) 81'; 34 – López (substituted on) 86'
Note: F.C. Motagua lost their first game in the Clausura tournament. Additionally, it was their first loss as home club since November 2016, a long-lasting record of 29 unbeaten games.

18 March 2018 Week 13	Honduras Progreso	1–2	Motagua	El Progreso, Yoro
15:00	Morales 60'	Report	13' Martínez; 37' Montes	Stadium: Estadio Humberto Micheletti; Referee: Melvin Matamoros Starting XI: 19 – Rougier; 2 – Montes; 5 – Pereira; 6 – Mayorquín; 7 – Discua; 8 – Martínez; 9 – Castillo; 10 – Andino (substituted off) 69'; 12 – Santos; 27 – Crisanto; 41 – Baptiste (substituted off) 46'; Substitutes; 35 – Meléndez (substituted on) 46' (substituted off) 73'; 11 – Vega (substituted on) 69'; 3 – Figueroa (substituted on) 73'
Note: With the win, F.C. Motagua secured the top of the standings for another week.

25 March 2018 Week 14	Motagua	0–1	Olimpia	Tegucigalpa, Francisco Morazán
16:00		Report	45' (o.g.) Montes	Stadium: Estadio Tiburcio Carías Andino; Referee: Óscar Moncada Starting XI: 19 – Rougier; 2 – Montes; 3 – Figueroa; 5 – Pereira; 6 – Mayorquín (substituted off) 46'; 7 – Discua; 8 – Martínez; 9 – Castillo; 12 – Santos (substituted off) 71'; 16 – Castellanos; 34 – López (substituted off) 61'; Substitutes; 11 – Vega (substituted on) 46'; 10 – Andino (substituted on) 61'; 24 – Elvir (substituted on) 71'
Note: Despite the defeat, F.C. Motagua stayed one more week at the top of the standings. Defender Juan Montes scored his second own goal against his club and his first one since August 2015.

29 March 2018 Week 15	Motagua	1–2	Platense	Tegucigalpa, Francisco Morazán
19:00	Flores 70' (o.g.)	Report	64' Nieto; 85' Winchester	Stadium: Estadio Tiburcio Carías Andino; Referee: Héctor Rodríguez Starting XI: 1 – Fonseca; 2 – Montes; 3 – Figueroa; 6 – Mayorquín; 7 – Discua; 8 – Martínez (substituted off) 65'; 9 – Castillo; 11 – Vega (substituted off) 64'; 24 – Elvir; 27 – F. Crisanto; 41 – Baptiste (substituted off) 46'; Substitutes; 18 – W. Crisanto (substituted on) 46'; 22 – Estupiñán (substituted on) 64'; 14 – Mayenfisch (substituted on) 65'
Note: The match started with a tribute to former player Santiago Vergara who passed away a few hours before. Defender Wilmer Crisanto played as goalkeeper the last 10 minutes of the game as Harold Fonseca saw a straight red card. This was the first lost to Platense F.C. at home since August 2006. Additionally, F.C. Motagua lost their third straight home game.

7 April 2018 Week 16	Marathón	2–1	Motagua	San Pedro Sula, Cortés
15:00	Arboleda 70' (pen.) 80'	Report	21' Castillo	Stadium: Estadio Yankel Rosenthal; Referee: Héctor Rodríguez Starting XI: 19 – Rougier; 2 – Montes; 5 – Pereira; 6 – Mayorquín (substituted off) 79'; 7 – Discua; 8 – Martínez (substituted off) 72'; 9 – Castillo; 12 – Santos; 16 – Castellanos; 18 – W. Crisanto (substituted off) 82'; 27 – F. Crisanto; Substitutes; 10 – Andino (substituted on) 72'; 3 – Figueroa (substituted on) 79'; 22 – Estupiñán (substituted on) 82'
Note: This defeat represented F.C. Motagua's third straight loss, an adverse streak which happened for the first time since October 2011, coincidentally also against Club Deportivo Olimpia, C.D. Marathón and Platense F.C. Forward Román Castillo scored his 74th goal with the team, and became the all-time top goalscorer according to the club.

12 April 2018 Week 17	Motagua	3–2	Juticalpa	Comayagua, Comayagua
19:00	Castillo 5' 57' (pen.); Mayorquín 83'	Report	44' Lanza; 49' Güity	Stadium: Estadio Carlos Miranda; Referee: Óscar Moncada Starting XI: 19 – Rougier; 2 – Montes; 3 – Figueroa; 6 – Mayorquín; 7 – Discua (substituted off) 78'; 9 – Castillo; 18 – W. Crisanto; 22 – Estupiñán (substituted off) 53'; 24 – Elvir; 27 – F. Crisanto; 41 – Baptiste; Substitutes; 11 – Vega (substituted on) 53'; 8 – Martínez (substituted on); 10 – Andino (substituted on) 78'
Note: Due to the crowd troubles aroused in the Honduran Superclásico on 25 March, F.C. Motagua was banned from their stadium for one game, making this the ninth game this season they have to play outside their ground. The match was moved to Comayagua.

15 April 2018 Week 18	Vida	0–1	Motagua	La Ceiba, Atlántida
15:00		Report	41' Crisanto	Stadium: Estadio Nilmo Edwards; Referee: Melvin Matamoros Starting XI: 19 – Rougier; 2 – Montes; 3 – Figueroa; 5 – Pereira; 6 – Mayorquín; 7 – Discua (substituted off) 78'; 9 – Castillo (substituted off) 62'; 11 – Vega; 18 – Crisanto; 24 – Elvir (substituted off) 64'; 41 – Baptiste; Substitutes; 22 – Estupiñán (substituted on) 62'; 12 – Santos (substituted on) 64'; 16 – Castellanos (substituted on) 78'
Note: With the win, F.C. Motagua finished the regular season in second position and advanced directly to the semifinals. Wilmer Crisanto scored the winning goal, which marked the goal number 20,000 in the history of the league.

29 April 2018 Semifinals	Olimpia	0–0	Motagua	Tegucigalpa, Francisco Morazán
16:00		Report		Stadium: Estadio Tiburcio Carías Andino; Referee: Saíd Martínez Starting XI: 19 – Rougier; 2 – Montes; 3 – Figueroa; 6 – Mayorquín; 7 – Discua (substituted off) 75'; 9 – Castillo; 10 – Andino (substituted off) 84'; 12 – Santos; 16 – Castellanos; 17 – Maldonado; 27 – Crisanto; Substitutes; 14 – Mayenfisch (substituted on) 75'; 22 – Estupiñán (substituted on) 84'
Note: Goalkeeper Jonathan Rougier won his seventh clean sheet of the tournament. It was the 44th scoreless game in the history of the Honduran Superclásico, the most repeated result along with 1–1.

6 May 2018 Semifinals	Motagua	1–1	Olimpia	Tegucigalpa, Francisco Morazán
16:00	Martínez 77'	Report	39' Costly	Stadium: Estadio Tiburcio Carías Andino; Referee: Óscar Moncada Starting XI: 19 – Rougier; 2 – Montes (substituted off) 73'; 3 – Figueroa; 6 – Mayorquín (substituted off) 46'; 7 – Discua; 9 – Castillo; 10 – Andino; 12 – Santos (substituted off) 46'; 16 – Castellanos; 18 – W. Crisanto; 27 – F. Crisanto; Substitutes; 24 – Elvir (substituted on) 46'; 8 – Martínez (substituted on) 46'; 22 – Estupiñán (substituted on) 73'
Note: With a 1–1 aggregate score and thanks to their better position in the regular season standings, F.C. Motagua managed to advanced to their 4th consecutive final. The result 1–1 became the most common result (45 times) in the Honduran Superclásico history. With this result, the team also secured a spot for international competition in 2018–19.

13 May 2018 Final	Motagua	1–1	Marathón	Tegucigalpa, Francisco Morazán
16:00	Discua 27'	Report	41' Martínez	Stadium: Estadio Tiburcio Carías Andino; Referee: Melvin Matamoros Starting XI: 19 – Rougier; 2 – Montes; 3 – Figueroa; 7 – Discua; 8 – Martínez (substituted off) 63'; 9 – Castillo; 10 – Andino (substituted off) 46'; 16 – Castellanos; 18 – W. Crisanto (substituted off) 80'; 24 – Elvir; 27 – F. Crisanto; Substitutes; 11 – Vega (substituted on) 46'; 6 – Mayorquín (substituted on) 63'; 14 – Mayenfisch (substituted on) 80'
Note: F.C. Motagua will face C.D. Marathón in a final series for their 4th time in league's history, and their first one since 2007. In the previous three, Motagua won one and lost two.

19 May 2018 Final	Marathón	0–0 (a.e.t.) (5–4 p)	Motagua	San Pedro Sula, Cortés
14:00		Report		Stadium: Estadio Yankel Rosenthal; Referee: Óscar Moncada Starting XI: 19 – Rougier; 2 – Montes; 3 – Figueroa; 5 – Pereira; 6 – Mayorquín; 7 – Discua (substituted off) 94'; 9 – Castillo (substituted off) 76'; 16 – Castellanos; 22 – Estupiñán (substituted off) 45+1'; 24 – Elvir; 27 – F. Crisanto; Substitutes; 8 – Martínez (substituted on) 45+1'; 11 – Vega (substituted on) 76'; 18 – W. Crisanto (substituted on) 94'
	Penalties
	Leverón (penalty missed); Banegas (penalty scored); Vargas (penalty scored); Suazo (penalty scored); Rodríguez (penalty scored); Johnson (penalty scored)		(penalty scored) Crisanto; (penalty scored) Montes; (penalty scored) Martínez; (penalty missed) Pereira; (penalty scored) Elvir; (penalty missed) Mayorquín
Note: After a 1–1 aggregate, the championship was decided with penalty shoot-outs where F.C. Motagua lost 4–5. With the loss, the club qualified to the 2018 CONCACAF League. Manager Diego Vásquez reached 200 consecutive games leading the team, a franchise and league record.

=== Honduran Supercup ===
2 August 2017	Marathón	1–2	Motagua	San Pedro Sula, Cortés
19:00	Lacayo 83'	Report	67' Andino; 77' Crisanto	Stadium: Estadio Francisco Morazán; Referee: Orlando Hernández Starting XI: 19 – Rougier; 2 – Montes; 5 – Pereira; 6 – Mayorquín (substituted off) 66'; 8 – Martínez (substituted off) 46'; 10 – Andino (substituted off) 80'; 11 – Vega (substituted off) 86'; 16 – Castellanos; 27 – F. Crisanto; 31 – Bernárdez; 34 – López (substituted off) 66'; Substitutes; 7 – Discua (substituted on) 46'; 23 – Flores (substituted on) 66'; 18 – W. Crisanto (substituted on) 66'; 12 – Santos (substituted on) 80'; 9 – Castillo (substituted on) 86'
Note: With the win, F.C. Motagua captured their second Honduran Supercup title and their first one since 1999.

=== CONCACAF Champions League ===
21 February 2018 Round of 16	Motagua (Honduras)	0–1	(Mexico) Tijuana	Edinburg, United States
21:00		Report	71' Rivero	Stadium: H-E-B Park; Referee: Henry Bejarano (CRC) Starting XI: 19 – Rougier; 2 – Montes; 5 – Pereira; 6 – Mayorquín; 7 – Discua (substituted off) 69'; 8 – Martínez (substituted off) 77'; 9 – Castillo; 12 – Santos; 16 – Castellanos; 18 – W. Crisanto (substituted off) 76'; 27 – F. Crisanto; Substitutes; 11 – Vega (substituted on) 69'; 34 – López (substituted on) 76'; 10 – Andino (substituted on) 77'
Note: This was F.C. Motagua's first ever encounter against Club Tijuana and the fourth overall series against a Mexican club in official contention. The game was moved to the United States due to the 2017–2018 Honduran protests. During the second half, the game was suspended for 50 minutes due to an electric storm.

27 February 2018 Round of 16	Tijuana (Mexico)	1–1	(Honduras) Motagua	Tijuana, Mexico
19:00 PST	García 3'	Report	88' Martínez	Stadium: Estadio Caliente; Attendance: 15,333; Referee: Mario Escobar (GUA) Starting XI: 19 – Rougier; 2 – Montes; 5 – Pereira; 6 – Mayorquín (substituted off) 65'; 7 – Discua; 8 – Martínez; 9 – Castillo; 12 – Santos; 17 – Maldonado; 18 – W. Crisanto (substituted off) 72'; 31 – Bernárdez (substituted off) 53'; Substitutes; 24 – Elvir (substituted on) 53'; 22 – Estupiñán (substituted on) 65'; 34 – López (substituted on) 72'
Note: The goal scored by Walter Martínez marked the first ever F.C. Motagua's goal and point against a Mexican club playing away. Additionally, it was the first away point by a Honduran team against a Mexican club since 2008.

=== By round ===
Round	1	2	3	4	5	6	7	8	9	10	11	12	13	14	15	16	17	18	19	20	21	22	23	24	25	26	27	28	29	30	31	32	33	34	35	36
Ground	H	A	H	A	H	H	H	A	H	A	H	A	H	A	A	A	H	A	A	H	A	H	A	A	H	A	H	H	A	H	A	H	H	A	H	A
Result	D	D	W	W	D	D	W	L	D	W	W	W	W	D	L	L	W	W	W	W	D	W	D	D	W	W	W	W	D	L	W	L	L	L	W	W
Position	4	7	1	3	2	2	2	2	3	3	2	1	1	1	3	2	2	2	2	2	2	1	1	1	1	1	1	1	1	1	1	1	2	2	2	2

A = Away; H = Home; W = Win; D = Draw; L = Loss

== Statistics ==
- As of 19 May 2018

Competition	GP	GW	GD	GL	GS	GC	GD	CS	SG	Per
League	44	21	14	9	67	46	+21	16	8	58.33%
Supercup	1	1	0	0	2	1	+1	0	0	100.00%
Champions League	2	0	1	1	1	2	–1	0	1	16.67%
Others	9	4	3	2	19	10	+9	4	4	55.56%
Totals	56	26	18	12	89	59	+30	20	13	57.14%
