= 2016–17 C.D. Motagua season =

Motagua
2016–17 season
- Chairman: Eduardo Atala
- Manager: Diego Vásquez
- Apertura: Winners
- Clausura: Winners
- Cup: Round of 64
- Top goalscorer: League: Castillo (18); All: Castillo (18)
Home colours	Away colours	Third colours
- All statistics correct as of 28 May 2017.

The 2016–17 season was F.C. Motagua's 70th season in existence and the club's 51st consecutive season in the top fight of Honduran football. The club announced the continuation of Diego Vásquez as the team's head coach for his 4th consecutive season.

== Overview ==
This season, the club fought for its 14th league and 2nd domestic cup. During the preseason, a new badge was unveiled to be used starting this season. On 2 July, the club's president Eduardo Atala confirmed an exhibition game against current Copa Libertadores winners at that time and South American giants River Plate. The game was played at Orlando, United States.

The Apertura schedule was unveiled on the second week of July and the club decided to return their home games on Sundays afternoon after their last season experiment of playing on Saturdays seeking for better assistances didn't throw the expected results. In week 6, Motagua faced C.D. Social Sol at home; in the 50' minute (0–0), the referee decided to suspend the match due to heavy rain which caused a power outage. The remaining 40 minutes were played the following morning, landing in the club's 88th anniversary. Román Castillo who had lost his younger brother a week prior, decided the match with a late goal at the 90th+5 minute. On 25 September, Motagua had to move its home game against C.D. Honduras Progreso to Catacamas due to a religious event that took place at Estadio Tiburcio Carías Andino. This match at Catacamas marked history in the Honduran Liga Nacional as the first game ever officiated by a female referee. On week 17, a 2–2 away tie against Real C.D. España defined Motagua's 4th place in the regular season standings and therefore, a berth to the playoffs phase. Once in the playoffs, Motagua defeated C.D. Marathón away in postseason for the first time since November 1990; however, the access to the semifinals didn't turn out that easy as Motagua had to rely on a late and controversial penalty in the second leg to advance with a 3–3 global score. In the semifinals Motagua faced city rivals Club Deportivo Olimpia for another edition of the Honduran Superclásico, resulting in the fourth time these two teams meet in this stage in the last three years. With a 2–1 aggregated score, Motagua moved on and qualified to their 19th league final in history. On 18 December, Motagua obtained their 14th national championship after defeating Platense F.C. in an unprecedented final. It was also the first time a league title was decided at Puerto Cortés. With the win, the team secured a spot for next season's CONCACAF club competitions.

Motagua started the Clausura tournament playing at Puerto Cortés losing 1–2 against Platense. On 21 January, Motagua traveled to Goascorán to play against Gremio F.C. for the first round of the 2017 Honduran Cup, a competition which ended way too early for Motagua's aspirations as they lost in penalty shootouts against a club that plays in third division. On 8 February, Diego Vásquez broke an all-time Liga Nacional record as the coach with the most number of consecutive games leading a team, totaling 140 games, surpassing Julio González (139 with C.D. Victoria). On 19 February, Motagua suffered their biggest defeat ever in Tocoa in the 0–4 loss to C.D. Real Sociedad. This result also marked the 11th unsuccessful try to obtain a victory at this venue since Real Sociedad's promotion in 2012. On 13 March, the club announced through their social media that Argentinian midfielder Santiago Vergara was being treated in a local health center as he was diagnosed with leukemia. Once in the post-season, Motagua defeated Real España for the first time ever in a semifinal. Despite losing key players from their roster, Motagua was capable of finishing the Clausura tournament with 14 unbeaten games in a row, a performance that resulted in their 15th league championship and a season's double. The Clausura final was played against C.D. Honduras Progreso, which marked their second meeting at this stage in less than two years. Motagua established a record as the largest goal difference in a final's global score (7–1). With the win, the team secured a spot for the 2018 CONCACAF Champions League.

Before the start of the final match against Honduras Progreso, the selling of fake tickets in the black market triggered a chaos among the fans inside and outside the stadium. Those still outside with ticket in hand precipitated towards one of the gates forming a human avalanche that killed 4 people due to asphyxiation.

== Kit ==
The 2016–17 kits were officially published on 12 July, one day before their friendly meeting against River Plate. Joma stayed as the kits manufacturer for the 17th straight season and Pepsi as the main sponsor. Other sponsors include Claro, Diunsa, Gatorade and Retlan. In April, a special kit allusive to the 14th championship was released to be used for the rest of the season.

Manufacturer		Main sponsor	
Joma		Pepsi	
Home	Away	Alternative	Goalkeeper

== Players ==
=== Transfers in ===
Player	Contract date	Moving from
(Honduras) Román Castillo	1 June 2016	(Mexico) Correcaminos UAT
(Honduras) Arnold Meléndez	1 June 2016	(Honduras) Gimnástico
(Honduras) Harold Fonseca	7 June 2016	(Honduras) Juticalpa
(Honduras) Carlos Discua	8 June 2016	(Costa Rica) Alajuelense
(Argentina) Martín Pucheta	8 June 2016	(Argentina) Deportivo Maipú
(Honduras) Marco Vega	25 June 2016	(Honduras) Real Sociedad
(Honduras) Deybi Flores	9 August 2016	(Canada) Vancouver Whitecaps
(Argentina) Jonathan Rougier	7 January 2017	(Argentina) Pronunciamiento

=== Transfers out ===
Player	Released date	Moving to
(Honduras) Néstor Martínez	19 May 2016	(Honduras) Platense
(Honduras) José Fiallos	19 May 2016	TBD
(Honduras) Keller Andino	19 May 2016	TBD
(Honduras) Orlin Peralta	19 May 2016	TBD
(Brazil) Israel Silva	25 May 2016	(Honduras) Marathón
(Argentina) Lucas Gómez	31 May 2016	(Costa Rica) Alajuelense
(Argentina) Sebastián Portigliatti	1 June 2016	(Honduras) Juticalpa
(Honduras) Maylor Núñez	18 July 2016	(Honduras) Platense
(Honduras) Júnior Izaguirre	20 December 2016	Retired
(Honduras) Deybi Flores	20 December 2016	(Canada) Vancouver Whitecaps
(Honduras) Arnold Meléndez	6 January 2017	TBD
(Honduras) Joshua Nieto	6 January 2017	TBD

=== Squad ===
- Statistics as of 28 May 2017
- Only league matches into account

No.	Pos.	Player name	Date of birth and age	Games played			Goals scored		
				< 15/16	16/17	T	< 15/16	16/17	T
1	GK	(Honduras) Harold Fonseca	8 October 1993 (aged 22)	0	16	16	0	0	0
2	DF	(Honduras) Juan Montes	26 October 1985 (aged 30)	89	42	131	4	4	8
3	DF	(Honduras) Henry Figueroa	28 December 1992 (aged 23)	98	31	129	2	0	2
4	DF	(Honduras) Júnior Izaguirre	12 August 1979 (aged 36)	398	6	404	37	0	37
5	DF	(Honduras) Marcelo Pereira	27 May 1995 (aged 21)	22	28	50	1	2	3
6	MF	(Honduras) Reinieri Mayorquín	13 July 1989 (aged 26)	73	37	110	5	3	8
7	MF	(Honduras) Carlos Discua	27 September 1984 (aged 31)	140	42	182	38	11	49
8	MF	(Honduras) Deybi Flores	16 June 1996 (aged 20)	22	5	27	0	0	0
9	FW	(Honduras) Román Castillo	26 November 1991 (aged 24)	66	32	98	35	18	53
10	MF	(Honduras) Erick Andino	21 July 1989 (aged 26)	33	37	70	10	15	25
11	FW	(Honduras) Marco Vega	14 April 1987 (aged 29)	0	37	37	0	8	8
14	FW	(Honduras) Irvin Reyna	7 June 1987 (aged 29)	91	28	119	2	1	3
15	FW	(Honduras) Arnold Meléndez	23 August 1994 (aged 21)	7	0	7	0	0	0
16	MF	(Honduras) Héctor Castellanos	28 December 1992 (aged 23)	33	40	73	0	1	1
17	DF	(Honduras) Denil Maldonado	25 May 1998 (aged 18)	1	3	4	0	0	0
18	DF	(Honduras) Wilmer Crisanto	24 June 1989 (aged 27)	96	36	132	5	7	12
19	MF	(Honduras) Eli Reyna	11 September 1996 (aged 19)	0	0	0	0	0	0
19	GK	(Argentina) Jonathan Rougier	29 October 1987 (aged 28)	0	20	20	0	0	0
21	FW	(Honduras) Foslyn Grant	4 October 1998 (aged 17)	12	4	16	1	0	1
22	MF	(Argentina) Santiago Vergara	15 September 1991 (aged 24)	41	31	72	8	4	12
23	DF	(Argentina) Martín Pucheta	10 February 1988 (aged 28)	0	20	20	0	0	0
24	DF	(Honduras) Omar Elvir	28 September 1989 (aged 26)	157	41	198	6	2	8
25	GK	(Honduras) Marlon Licona	9 February 1991 (aged 25)	56	11	67	0	0	0
26	DF	(Honduras) Henry Güity	24 June 1996 (aged 20)	4	0	4	0	0	0
27	DF	(Honduras) Félix Crisanto	9 September 1990 (aged 25)	32	32	64	1	4	5
28	MF	(Honduras) Joshua Nieto	3 September 1994 (aged 21)	18	1	19	0	0	0
31	DF	(Honduras) Klifox Bernárdez	14 May 1997 (aged 19)	2	24	26	0	0	0
32	MF	(Honduras) Marvin Ávila	6 March 2002 (aged 14)	0	0	0	0	0	0
33	GK	(Honduras) Cristian Hernández	22 September 1996 (aged 19)	0	0	0	0	0	0
34	FW	(Honduras) Kevin López	3 February 1996 (aged 20)	47	22	69	7	3	10
35	DF	(Honduras) Cristopher Meléndez	25 November 1997 (aged 18)	0	7	7	0	0	0
Manager		(Argentina) Diego Vásquez	3 July 1971 (aged 44)	23 November 2013–					
RESERVES TEAM
No.	Pos.	Player name	Date of birth and age	Games played			Goals scored		
				< 15/16	16/17	T	< 15/16	16/17	T
15	FW	(Honduras) Denilson Castillo	29 April 1998 (aged 18)	0	2	2	0	0	0
36	MF	(Honduras) Edward Centeno	2 August 1999 (aged 16)	0	0	0	0	0	0
37	DF	(Honduras) Carlos García	20 September 1998 (aged 17)	0	0	0	0	0	0
38	DF	(Honduras) Harrinson Bernárdez	14 May 1997 (aged 19)	2	1	3	0	0	0
39	FW	(Honduras) Juan Pastrana	11 August 2000 (aged 15)	0	0	0	0	0	0
40	DF	(Honduras) José Murillo	2 April 1998 (aged 18)	0	0	0	0	0	0
41	MF	(Honduras) Jack Jean Baptiste	20 December 1999 (aged 16)	0	0	0	0	0	0
42	MF	(Honduras) Carlos Mayorquín	30 January 1998 (aged 18)	0	0	0	0	0	0
43	MF	(Honduras) Wilmer Sandoval	4 January 1998 (aged 18)	0	0	0	0	0	0
44	GK	(Honduras) Elin Agurcia	30 April 1999 (aged 17)	0	0	0	0	0	0
45	MF	(Honduras) Cid Bodden	1 March 1997 (aged 19)	0	0	0	0	0	0
47	MF	(Honduras) Josué Villafranca	16 December 1999 (aged 16)	0	1	1	0	0	0
48	DF	(Honduras) Brayan Velásquez	26 February 1998 (aged 18)	0	0	0	0	0	0
49	FW	(Honduras) Manuel Iglesias	23 May 1999 (aged 17)	0	0	0	0	0	0
50	MF	(Honduras) Jonathan Galo	10 February 1998 (aged 18)	0	0	0	0	0	0
51	MF	(Honduras) Óscar Romero	23 February 1999 (aged 17)	0	0	0	0	0	0
52	MF	(Honduras) Daniel Hill	24 January 1998 (aged 18)	0	0	0	0	0	0
53	MF	(Honduras) César Romero	19 January 1999 (aged 17)	0	2	2	0	0	0
54	DF	(Honduras) Anthony Cervantes	10 August 1997 (aged 18)	0	0	0	0	0	0
55	MF	(Honduras) Bayron Varela	1 July 2000 (aged 16)	0	0	0	0	0	0
56	MF	(Honduras) José Canaca	11 April 2000 (aged 16)	0	0	0	0	0	0
57	MF	(Honduras) Kevin Castro	9 October 1998 (aged 17)	0	0	0	0	0	0
58	GK	(Honduras) Marcos Torres	26 January 1999 (aged 17)	0	0	0	0	0	0
59	GK	(Honduras) Hugo Caballero	5 January 1997 (aged 19)	0	0	0	0	0	0
60	GK	(Honduras) José Rodríguez	1 April 1999 (aged 17)	0	0	0	0	0	0
61	MF	(Honduras) Jessell Pineda	5 April 1998 (aged 18)	0	0	0	0	0	0
–	FW	(Honduras) Hodi Bonilla	20 March 1999 (aged 17)	0	0	0	0	0	0
–	FW	(Honduras) Erikxon Fuentes	24 February 1998 (aged 18)	0	0	0	0	0	0

== Results ==
=== Preseason and friendlies ===
2 July 2016 Friendly	San Lorenzo	0–5	Motagua	San Lorenzo, Valle
15:30 CST			35' Castillo; 39' Vergara; 55' Andino; 65' Discua; 71' Reyna	Stadium: Estadio Ángel Augusto Martínez; Referee: Starting XI: 25 – Licona (substituted off); 2 – Montes (substituted off); 3 – Figueroa; 6 – Mayorquín; 9 – Castillo; 11 – Vega; 16 – Castellanos; 18 – W. Crisanto; 22 – Vergara; 23 – Pucheta; 24 – Elvir; Substitutes; 1 – Fonseca (substituted on); 4 – Izaguirre (substituted on); 10 – Andino (substituted on); 14 – Reyna (substituted on); 27 – F. Crisanto (substituted on); 31 – K. Bernárdez (substituted on); 38 – H. Bernárdez (substituted on); 19 – Garrido (substituted on); 7 – Discua (substituted on); 28 – Meléndez (substituted on)

9 July 2016 Friendly	Honduras Progreso	2–2	Motagua	El Progreso, Yoro
15:00 CST			Figueroa; Castillo	Stadium: Open field

13 July 2016 Friendly	Motagua (Honduras)	0–3	(Argentina) River Plate	Bay Lake, United States
19:00 EST			34' Andrade; 84' Mora; 88' Martínez	Stadium: ESPN Wide World of Sports Complex; Referee: Esteban Rosano (USA) Starting XI: 25 – Licona; 2 – Montes; 3 – Figueroa; 6 – Mayorquín (substituted off) 70'; 7 – Discua; 10 – Andino (substituted off) 82'; 11 – Vega; 14 – Reyna (substituted off) 58'; 16 – Castellanos; 18 – Crisanto; 24 – Elvir; Substitutes; 19 – Garrido (substituted on) 58'; 4 – Izaguirre (substituted on) 70'; 22 – Bernárdez (substituted on) 82'

20 July 2016 Friendly	Honduras U-23	1–2	Motagua	Comayagua, Comayagua
17:00 CST	Lozano 55'		40' (pen.) Castillo; 60' Vega	Stadium: Estadio Carlos Miranda; Attendance: Open gates

23 July 2016 Friendly	Motagua	0–2	Atlético Independiente	Amarateca, Francisco Morazán
17:00 CST				Stadium: Complejo Pedro Atala Simón; Referee: Starting XI: 25 – Licona (substituted off) 46'; 2 – Montes (substituted off) 46'; 3 – Figueroa (substituted off) 46'; 6 – Mayorquín (substituted off) 46'; 7 – Discua (substituted off) 46'; 9 – Castillo (substituted off) 46'; 11 – Vega (substituted off) 46'; 16 – Castellanos (substituted off) 46'; 22 – Vergara (substituted off) 46'; 23 – Pucheta (substituted off) 46'; 24 – Elvir (substituted off) 46'; Substitutes; 33 – Hernández (substituted on) 46'; 4 – Izaguirre (substituted on) 46'; 10 – Andino (substituted on) 46'; 14 – Reyna (substituted on) 46'; 17 – Maldonado (substituted on) 46'; 18 – W. Crisanto (substituted on) 46'; 19 – Garrido (substituted on) 46'; 21 – Grant (substituted on) 46'; 27 – F. Crisanto (substituted on) 46'; 28 – Nieto (substituted on) 46'; 31 – Bernárdez (substituted on) 46'

25 August 2016 Friendly	Independiente	1–2	Motagua	Monjarás, Choluteca
15:00 CST			Elvir; Montes	Stadium: Estadio Evaristo Najar Romero

9 November 2016 Friendly	Comayagua	1–5	Motagua	Comayagua, Comayagua
19:00 CST	Torres 55'		Castillo; Nieto; Vega; Vergara	Stadium: Estadio Carlos Miranda

6 May 2017 Friendly	Motagua	4–0	Gimnástico	Tegucigalpa, Francisco Morazán
15:00 CST	Andino; Pucheta			Stadium: Estadio Tiburcio Carías Andino; Attendance: Closed gates

=== Apertura ===
31 July 2016 Round 1	Honduras Progreso	0–2	Motagua	El Progreso, Yoro
15:15 CST		Report	51' Mayorquín; 60' Discua	Stadium: Estadio Humberto Micheletti; Attendance: 2,251; Referee: Raúl Castro Starting XI: 1 – Licona; 2 – Montes; 3 – Figueroa; 6 – Mayorquín (substituted off) 65'; 7 – Discua (substituted off) 76'; 9 – Castillo (substituted off) 80'; 11 – Vega; 16 – Castellanos; 22 – Vergara; 23 – Pucheta; 24 – Elvir; Substitutes; 18 – Crisanto (substituted on) 65'; 14 – Reyna (substituted on) 76'; 10 – Andino (substituted on) 80'

7 August 2016 Round 2	Motagua	2–0	Real Sociedad	Tegucigalpa, Francisco Morazán
16:00 CST	Montes 9'; Vega 40'	Report		Stadium: Estadio Tiburcio Carías Andino; Attendance: 3,667; Referee: Nelson Salgado Starting XI: 25 – Licona; 2 – Montes; 3 – Figueroa; 6 – Mayorquín (substituted off) 72'; 7 – Discua (substituted off) 78'; 9 – Castillo; 11 – Vega; 16 – Castellanos; 22 – Vergara; 23 – Pucheta; 24 – Elvir (substituted off) 67'; Substitutes; 31 – Bernárdez (substituted on) 67'; 27 – Crisanto (substituted on) 72'; 14 – Reyna (substituted on) 78'

10 August 2016 Round 3	Juticalpa	0–0	Motagua	Juticalpa, Olancho
18:00 CST		Report		Stadium: Estadio Juan Ramón Brevé Vargas; Attendance: 3,294; Referee: Geovanny Mendoza Starting XI: 25 – Licona; 2 – Montes; 6 – Mayorquín (substituted off) 65'; 7 – Discua; 9 – Castillo; 11 – Vega (substituted off) 72'; 16 – Castellanos; 22 – Vergara (substituted off) 80'; 23 – Pucheta; 24 – Elvir; 27 – F. Crisanto; Substitutes; 18 – W. Crisanto (substituted on) 65'; 10 – Andino (substituted on) 72'; 31 – Bernárdez (substituted on) 80'

14 August 2016 Round 4	Motagua	3–1	Marathón	Tegucigalpa, Francisco Morazán
16:00 CST	Castillo 14' 57' (pen.) 90+3'	Report	75' Vargas	Stadium: Estadio Tiburcio Carías Andino; Attendance: 4,033; Referee: Armando Castro Starting XI: 25 – Licona; 2 – Montes; 3 – Figueroa; 6 – Mayorquín (substituted off) 70'; 7 – Discua (substituted off) 77'; 9 – Castillo; 11 – Vega; 16 – Castellanos; 22 – Vergara; 23 – Pucheta (substituted off) 46'; 24 – Elvir; Substitutes; 4 – Izaguirre (substituted on) 46'; 18 – Crisanto (substituted on) 70'; 14 – Reyna (substituted on) 77'

8 September 2016 Round 5	Olimpia	3–1	Motagua	Tegucigalpa, Francisco Morazán
19:00 CST	Estupiñán 6' 35'; Méndez 42'	Report	59' (pen.) Andino	Stadium: Estadio Tiburcio Carías Andino; Attendance: 6,370; Referee: Geovanny Mendoza Starting XI: 25 – Licona; 2 – Montes; 6 – Mayorquín; 7 – Discua (substituted off) 46'; 9 – Castillo; 11 – Vega (substituted off) 46'; 16 – Castellanos; 23 – Pucheta; 24 – Elvir; 27 – Crisanto; 35 – Meléndez (substituted off) 22'; Substitutes; 10 – Andino (substituted on) 22'; 14 – Reyna (substituted on) 46'; 34 – López (substituted on) 46'

29 August 2016 Round 6	Motagua	1–0	Social Sol	Tegucigalpa, Francisco Morazán
10:00 CST	Castillo 90+6'	Report		Stadium: Estadio Tiburcio Carías Andino; Attendance: 4,202; Referee: José Ramírez Starting XI: 25 – Licona; 2 – Montes; 3 – Figueroa (substituted off) 51'; 6 – Mayorquín; 7 – Discua (substituted off) 51'; 9 – Castillo; 11 – Vega (substituted off) 51'; 16 – Castellanos; 22 – Vergara; 23 – Pucheta; 24 – Elvir; Substitutes; 10 – Andino (substituted on) 51'; 18 – W. Crisanto (substituted on) 51'; 27 – F. Crisanto (substituted on) 51'

11 September 2016 Round 7	Platense	4–2	Motagua	Puerto Cortés, Cortés
15:00 CST	Álvarez 16'; Norales 41' 62'; Montes 59'	Report	39' Montes; 42' Andino	Stadium: Estadio Excélsior; Attendance: 2,271; Referee: Saíd Martínez Starting XI: 25 – Licona; 2 – Montes; 3 – Figueroa; 7 – Discua; 10 – Andino; 11 – Vega; 14 – Reyna; 23 – Pucheta; 27 – Crisanto (substituted off) 46'; 28 – Nieto (substituted off) 66'; 34 – López; Substitutes; 24 – Elvir (substituted on) 46'; 21 – Grant (substituted on) 66'

18 September 2016 Round 8	Motagua	1–1	Real España	Tegucigalpa, Francisco Morazán
16:00 CST	Discua 42'; Andino (penalty missed)	Report	83' Róchez	Stadium: Estadio Tiburcio Carías Andino; Attendance: 3,506; Referee: Héctor Rodríguez Starting XI: 1 – Fonseca; 2 – Montes; 3 – Figueroa; 5 – Pereira; 6 – Mayorquín; 7 – Discua (substituted off) 81'; 10 – Andino; 11 – Vega; 14 – Reyna; 18 – Crisanto (substituted off) 78'; 24 – Elvir (substituted off) 66'; Substitutes; 31 – Bernárdez (substituted on) 66'; 34 – López (substituted on) 78'; 22 – Vergara (substituted on) 81'

21 September 2016 Round 9	Vida	0–1	Motagua	La Ceiba, Atlántida
19:00 CST		Report	10' Montes	Stadium: Estadio Nilmo Edwards; Attendance: 1,570; Referee: Armando Castro Starting XI: 1 – Fonseca; 2 – Montes; 3 – Figueroa (substituted off) 62'; 5 – Pereira; 7 – Discua; 9 – Castillo; 10 – Andino; 16 – Castellanos; 18 – Crisanto; 22 – Vergara (substituted off) 58'; 24 – Elvir; Substitutes; 14 – Reyna (substituted on) 58'; 23 – Pucheta (substituted on) 62'

25 September 2016 Round 10	Motagua	0–0	Honduras Progreso	Catacamas, Olancho
15:00 CST		Report		Stadium: Estadio Rubén Guifarro; Attendance: 2,760; Referee: Melissa Borjas Starting XI: 1 – Fonseca; 2 – Montes; 5 – Pereira; 7 – Discua; 10 – Andino; 16 – Castellanos; 18 – Crisanto (substituted off) 56'; 21 – Grant (substituted off) 46'; 22 – Vergara (substituted off) 66'; 23 – Pucheta; 31 – Bernárdez; Substitutes; 11 – Vega (substituted on) 46'; 34 – López (substituted on) 56'; 14 – Reyna (substituted on) 66'

2 October 2016 Round 11	Real Sociedad	1–1	Motagua	Tocoa, Colón
15:00 CST	Cárcamo 35'	Report	57' Crisanto	Stadium: Estadio Francisco Martínez Durón; Attendance: 1,070; Referee: Miguel Torres Starting XI: 1 – Fonseca; 2 – Montes; 5 – Pereira; 7 – Discua; 10 – Andino; 11 – Vega; 16 – Castellanos; 17 – Maldonado; 22 – Vergara (substituted off) 75'; 23 – Pucheta (substituted off) 20'; 34 – López (substituted off) 46'; Substitutes; 27 – Crisanto (substituted on) 20'; 24 – Elvir (substituted on) 46'; 14 – Reyna (substituted on) 75'

9 October 2016 Round 12	Motagua	2–2	Juticalpa	Tegucigalpa, Francisco Morazán
16:00 CST	Crisanto 6'; Andino 24'	Report	8' Padilla; 63' (pen.) Flores	Stadium: Estadio Tiburcio Carías Andino; Attendance: 1,906; Referee: Manuel Zelaya Starting XI: 1 – Fonseca; 2 – Montes; 4 – Izaguirre; 6 – Mayorquín (substituted off) 66'; 10 – Andino; 16 – Castellanos (substituted off) 73'; 18 – W. Crisanto (substituted off) 79'; 22 – Vergara; 24 – Elvir; 27 – F. Crisanto; 34 – López; Substitutes; 14 – Reyna (substituted on) 66'; 8 – Flores (substituted on) 73'; 47 – Villafranca (substituted on) 79'

15 October 2016 Round 13	Marathón	3–1	Motagua	San Pedro Sula, Cortés
15:00 CST	Martínez 46'; Silva 66'; Reyes 71'	Report	5' Castillo	Stadium: Estadio Yankel Rosenthal; Attendance: 2,713; Referee: Raúl Castro Starting XI: 1 – Fonseca; 2 – Montes (substituted off) 32'; 4 – Izaguirre; 6 – Mayorquín; 7 – Discua (substituted off) 46'; 9 – Castillo; 16 – Castellanos (substituted off) 75'; 18 – W. Crisanto; 22 – Vergara; 24 – Elvir; 27 – F. Crisanto; Substitutes; 5 – Pereira (substituted on) 32'; 8 – Flores (substituted on) 46'; 11 – Vega (substituted on) 75'

23 October 2016 Round 14	Motagua	1–1	Olimpia	Tegucigalpa, Francisco Morazán
16:00 CST	Crisanto 54' (pen.)	Report	31' Costly	Stadium: Estadio Tiburcio Carías Andino; Attendance: 7,918; Referee: Saíd Martínez Starting XI: 1 – Fonseca; 3 – Figueroa; 4 – Izaguirre; 5 – Pereira; 7 – Discua; 11 – Vega; 14 – Reyna; 18 – W. Crisanto (substituted off) 82'; 22 – Vergara (substituted off) 74'; 24 – Elvir (substituted off) 70'; 27 – F. Crisanto; Substitutes; 31 – Bernárdez (substituted on) 70'; 10 – Andino (substituted on) 74'; 34 – López (substituted on) 82'

29 October 2016 Round 15	Social Sol	3–2	Motagua	Olanchito, Yoro
19:00 CST	Urmeneta 3'; Izaguirre 42' (o.g.); Antúnez 74'	Report	25' (pen.) Crisanto; 71' Vergara	Stadium: Estadio San Jorge; Attendance: 2,065; Referee: Geovanny Mendoza Starting XI: 1 – Fonseca; 3 – Figueroa; 4 – Izaguirre (substituted off) 82'; 7 – Discua; 11 – Vega; 14 – Reyna (substituted off) 46'; 18 – W. Crisanto; 24 – Elvir; 27 – F. Crisanto; 34 – López (substituted off) 60'; 38 – Bernárdez; Substitutes; 22 – Vergara (substituted on) 46'; 10 – Andino (substituted on) 60'; 35 – Meléndez (substituted on) 82'

2 November 2016 Round 16	Motagua	4–2	Platense	Tegucigalpa, Francisco Morazán
19:00 CST	Discua 35' 37'; Castillo 58' 66'	Report	34' Hay; 87' Lobo	Stadium: Estadio Tiburcio Carías Andino; Attendance: 1,166; Referee: Melvin Matamoros Starting XI: 1 – Fonseca; 2 – Montes; 4 – Izaguirre; 6 – Mayorquín (substituted off) 78'; 7 – Discua (substituted off) 82'; 9 – R. Castillo; 10 – Andino (substituted off) 71'; 16 – Castellanos; 18 – Crisantos; 22 – Vergara; 31 – Bernárdez; Substitutes; 24 – Elvir (substituted on) 71'; 14 – Reyna (substituted on) 78'; 49 – D. Castillo (substituted on) 82'

5 November 2016 Round 17	Real España	2–2	Motagua	San Pedro Sula, Cortés
19:00 CST	Zalazar 24'; Acosta 90+5'	Report	38' (pen.) Castillo; 67' Vergara	Stadium: Estadio Francisco Morazán; Attendance: 5,035; Referee: Óscar Moncada Starting XI: 1 – Fonseca; 2 – Montes; 3 – Figueroa; 6 – Mayorquín; 7 – Discua (substituted off) 88'; 9 – Castillo; 10 – Andino (substituted off) 64'; 16 – Castellanos; 22 – Vergara (substituted off) 76'; 27 – Crisanto; 31 – Bernárdez; Substitutes; 34 – López (substituted on) 64'; 24 – Elvir (substituted on) 76'; 11 – Vega (substituted on) 88'

19 November 2016 Round 18	Motagua	4–1	Vida	Tegucigalpa, Francisco Morazán
19:00 CST	Vega 56' 64'; Andino 62'; López 69'	Report	53' Velásquez	Stadium: Estadio Tiburcio Carías Andino; Referee: David Cruz Starting XI: 1 – Fonseca; 5 – Pereira; 7 – Discua (substituted off) 46'; 8 – Flores; 9 – Castillo (substituted off) 46'; 10 – Andino; 14 – Reyna; 17 – Maldonado; 18 – Crisanto; 22 – Vergara (substituted off) 46'; 31 – Bernárdez; Substitutes; 11 – Vega (substituted on) 46'; 24 – Elvir (substituted on) 46'; 34 – López (substituted on) 46'

23 November 2016 Playoffs	Marathón	1–2	Motagua	San Pedro Sula, Cortés
19:00 CST	Reyes 55'	Report	4' Montes; 90+1' Crisanto	Stadium: Estadio Francisco Morazán; Referee: Saíd Martínez Starting XI: 1 – Fonseca; 2 – Montes; 3 – Figueroa; 6 – Mayorquín; 7 – Discua (substituted off) 75'; 9 – Castillo; 10 – Andino (substituted off) 61'; 16 – Castellanos; 23 – Pucheta; 27 – Crisanto; 31 – Bernárdez (substituted off) 66'; Substitutes; 5 – Pereira (substituted on) 61'; 24 – Elvir (substituted on) 66'; 11 – Vega (substituted on) 75'

27 November 2016 Playoffs	Motagua	1–2	Marathón	Tegucigalpa, Francisco Morazán
16:00 CST	Castillo 90+7' (pen.)	Report	45+3' Reyes; 88' Puerto	Stadium: Estadio Tiburcio Carías Andino; Referee: Geovanny Mendoza Starting XI: 1 – Fonseca; 2 – Montes; 3 – Figueroa; 6 – Mayorquín (substituted off); 7 – Discua; 9 – Castillo; 16 – Castellanos; 18 – W. Crisanto (substituted off) 46'; 22 – Vergara; 27 – F. Crisanto; 31 – Bernárdez (substituted off) 46'; Substitutes; 5 – Pereira (substituted on) 46'; 24 – Elvir (substituted on) 46'; 8 – Flores (substituted on)

1 December 2016 Semifinals	Motagua	1–0	Olimpia	Tegucigalpa, Francisco Morazán
19:30 CST	Andino 57'	Report		Stadium: Estadio Tiburcio Carías Andino; Referee: Raúl Castro Starting XI: 1 – Fonseca; 2 – Montes; 3 – Figueroa; 5 – Pereira; 7 – Discua; 9 – Castillo; 11 – Vega (substituted off) 55'; 16 – Castellanos; 22 – Vergara (substituted off) 75'; 24 – Elvir; 27 – F. Crisanto (substituted off) 76'; Substitutes; 10 – Andino (substituted on) 55'; 6 – Mayorquín (substituted on) 75'; 18 – W. Crisanto (substituted on) 76'

4 December 2016 Semifinals	Olimpia	1–1	Motagua	Tegucigalpa, Francisco Morazán
16:00 CST	Estupiñán 45+2'	Report	31' Pereira	Stadium: Estadio Tiburcio Carías Andino; Referee: Melvin Matamoros Starting XI: 1 – Fonseca; 2 – Montes (substituted off) 34'; 3 – Figueroa; 5 – Pereira; 7 – Discua; 9 – Castillo; 11 – Vega (substituted off) 57'; 16 – Castellanos; 18 – Crisanto; 22 – Vergara (substituted off) 49'; 24 – Elvir; Substitutes; 23 – Pucheta (substituted on) 34'; 6 – Mayorquín (substituted on) 49'; 10 – Andino (substituted on) 57'

11 December 2016 Final	Motagua	1–0	Platense	Tegucigalpa, Francisco Morazán
16:00 CST	Vergara 45+3'	Report		Stadium: Estadio Tiburcio Carías Andino; Attendance: 22,637; Referee: Raúl Castro Starting XI: 1 – Fonseca (substituted off) 72'; 3 – Figueroa; 5 – Pereira; 7 – Discua; 9 – Castillo; 10 – Andino; 16 – Castellanos; 18 – W. Crisanto (substituted off) 58'; 22 – Vergara; 23 – Pucheta (substituted off) 64'; 24 – Elvir; Substitutes; 27 – F. Crisanto (substituted on) 58'; 6 – Mayorquín (substituted on) 64'; 25 – Licona (substituted on) 72'

18 December 2016 Final	Platense	1–1	Motagua	Puerto Cortés, Cortés
15:00 CST	Cardona 45+1'	Report	60' Discua	Stadium: Estadio Excélsior; Attendance: 9,033; Referee: Melvin Matamoros Starting XI: 25 – Licona; 2 – Montes; 3 – Figueroa; 5 – Pereira; 6 – Mayorquín (substituted off) 46'; 7 – Discua (substituted off) 71'; 9 – Castillo; 16 – Castellanos; 22 – Vergara; 27 – F. Crisanto (substituted off) 59'; 31 – Bernárdez; Substitutes; 11 – Vega (substituted on) 46'; 18 – W. Crisanto (substituted on) 59'; 8 – Flores (substituted on) 71'

=== Clausura ===
8 January 2017 Round 1	Platense	2–1	Motagua	Puerto Cortés, Cortés
15:00 CST	Hay 40'; Medina 84'	Report	24' Vega	Stadium: Estadio Excélsior; Attendance: 425; Referee: Geovanny Mendoza Starting XI: 25 – Licona; 2 – Montes; 5 – Pereira; 7 – Discua (substituted off) 71'; 9 – Castillo; 11 – Vega; 16 – Castellanos; 18 – Crisanto (substituted off) 46'; 22 – Vergara; 23 – Pucheta; 24 – Elvir (substituted off) 46'; Substitutes; 31 – Bernárdez (substituted on) 46'; 34 – López (substituted on) 46'; 6 – Mayorquín (substituted on) 71'

15 January 2017 Round 2	Motagua	3–1	Honduras Progreso	Tegucigalpa, Francisco Morazán
16:00 CST	Discua 1'; Crisanto 4' (pen.); Vergara 27'	Report	89' López	Stadium: Estadio Tiburcio Carías Andino; Attendance: 1,907; Referee: Nelson Salgado Starting XI: 25 – Licona; 2 – Montes; 6 – Mayorquín (substituted off) 73'; 7 – Discua (substituted off) 58'; 11 – Vega; 16 – Castellanos; 18 – Crisanto; 22 – Vergara; 23 – Pucheta; 31 – Bernárdez; 34 – López (substituted off) 79'; Substitutes; 15 – Castillo (substituted on) 58'; 14 – Reyna (substituted on) 73'; 53 – Romero (substituted on) 79'

28 January 2017 Round 3	Real España	2–2	Motagua	San Pedro Sula, Cortés
19:00 CST	Delgado 45+4'; Moncada 90+5'	Report	26' Mayorquín; 74' Castillo	Stadium: Estadio Francisco Morazán; Attendance: 3,159; Referee: Saíd Martínez Starting XI: 19 – Rougier; 2 – Montes; 5 – Pereira; 6 – Mayorquín (substituted off) 56'; 7 – Discua; 9 – Castillo; 16 – Castellanos; 22 – Vergara (substituted off) 65'; 27 – F. Crisanto; 31 – Bernárdez; 34 – López (substituted off) 57'; Substitutes; 14 – Reyna (substituted on) 56'; 18 – W. Crisanto (substituted on) 57'; 24 – Elvir (substituted on) 65'

1 February 2017 Round 4	Motagua	2–0	Vida	Tegucigalpa, Francisco Morazán
19:00 CST	Crisanto 54'; Vega 63'	Report		Stadium: Estadio Tiburcio Carías Andino; Attendance: 1,716; Referee: Raúl Castro Starting XI: 19 – Rougier; 2 – Montes; 5 – Pereira; 6 – Mayorquín (substituted off) 46'; 7 – Discua (substituted off) 57'; 9 – Castillo; 11 – Vega; 16 – Castellanos; 22 – Vergara; 27 – F. Crisanto; 31 – Bernárdez (substituted off); Substitutes; 18 – W. Crisanto (substituted on) 46'; 10 – Andino (substituted on) 57'; 24 – Elvir (substituted on)

5 February 2017 Round 5	Olimpia	2–2	Motagua	Tegucigalpa, Francisco Morazán
16:00 CST	Chirinos 86'; Rojas 90+4'	Report	55' (pen.) Castillo; 89' Andino	Stadium: Estadio Tiburcio Carías Andino; Attendance: 6,626; Referee: Óscar Moncada Starting XI: 19 – Rougier; 2 – Montes (substituted off) 82'; 5 – Pereira; 7 – Discua (substituted off) 63'; 9 – Castillo; 11 – Vega; 16 – Castellanos; 18 – W. Crisanto; 22 – Vergara; 24 – Elvir (substituted off) 73'; 27 – F. Crisanto; Substitutes; 6 – Mayorquín (substituted on) 63'; 31 – Bernárdez (substituted on) 73'; 10 – Andino (substituted on) 82'

8 February 2017 Round 6	Juticalpa	0–0	Motagua	Juticalpa, Olancho
19:00 CST		Report		Stadium: Estadio Juan Ramón Brevé Vargas; Attendance: 3,734; Referee: Nelson Salgado Starting XI: 19 – Rougier; 2 – Montes; 5 – Pereira; 6 – Mayorquín (substituted off) 80'; 9 – Castillo; 10 – Andino; 16 – Castellanos; 22 – Vergara (substituted off) 72'; 24 – Elvir; 27 – F. Crisanto; 34 – López (substituted off) 65'; Substitutes; 18 – W. Crisanto (substituted on) 65'; 31 – Bernárdez (substituted on) 72'; 14 – Reyna (substituted on) 80'

12 February 2017 Round 7	Motagua	2–0	Marathón	Tegucigalpa, Francisco Morazán
16:00 CST	Reyna 22'; Andino 71'	Report		Stadium: Estadio Tiburcio Carías Andino; Attendance: 3,333; Referee: Armando Castro Starting XI: 19 – Rougier; 2 – Montes; 3 – Figueroa; 10 – Andino; 11 – Vega (substituted off) 85'; 14 – Reyna (substituted off) 81'; 16 – Castellanos; 22 – Vergara; 23 – Pucheta; 27 – F. Crisanto (substituted off) 67'; 31 – Bernárdez; Substitutes; 18 – W. Crisanto (substituted on) 67'; 6 – Mayorquín (substituted on) 81'; 53 – Romero (substituted on) 85'

19 February 2017 Round 8	Real Sociedad	4–0	Motagua	Tocoa, Colón
14:00 CST	Martínez 47' 85'; Paz 53'; Melgares 59'	Report		Stadium: Estadio Francisco Martínez Durón; Attendance: 1,195; Referee: Geovanny Mendoza Starting XI: 19 – Rougier; 2 – Montes; 3 – Figueroa; 10 – Andino; 11 – Vega; 14 – Reyna (substituted off) 63'; 16 – Castellanos; 18 – W. Crisanto (substituted off) 70'; 23 – Pucheta; 27 – F. Crisanto (substituted off) 55'; 31 – Bernárdez; Substitutes; 9 – Castillo (substituted on) 55'; 6 – Mayorquín (substituted on) 63'; 35 – Meléndez (substituted on) 70'

26 February 2017 Round 9	Motagua	4–0	Social Sol	Tegucigalpa, Francisco Morazán
16:00 CST	Andino 55' 89'; Castillo 70' (pen.) 83'	Report		Stadium: Estadio Tiburcio Carías Andino; Attendance: 1,769; Referee: Héctor Rodríguez Starting XI: 19 – Rougier; 2 – Montes; 3 – Figueroa; 9 – Castillo; 10 – Andino; 11 – Vega (substituted off) 46'; 16 – Castellanos; 18 – Crisanto; 22 – Vergara (substituted off) 72'; 23 – Pucheta; 31 – Bernárdez (substituted off) 79'; Substitutes; 7 – Discua (substituted on) 46'; 14 – Reyna (substituted on) 72'; 24 – Elvir (substituted on) 79'

1 March 2017 Round 10	Motagua	4–0	Platense	Tegucigalpa, Francisco Morazán
19:00 CST	Castillo 12' 46'; Andino 68'; Castellanos 70'	Report		Stadium: Estadio Tiburcio Carías Andino; Attendance: 940; Referee: Saíd Martínez Starting XI: 19 – Rougier; 2 – Montes; 3 – Figueroa; 7 – Discua; 9 – Castillo (substituted off) 70'; 10 – Andino; 16 – Castellanos; 18 – Crisanto (substituted off) 76'; 22 – Vergara (substituted off) 66'; 23 – Pucheta; 24 – Elvir; Substitutes; 6 – Mayorquín (substituted on) 66'; 11 – Vega (substituted on) 70'; 35 – Meléndez (substituted on) 76'

4 March 2017 Round 11	Honduras Progreso	2–2	Motagua	El Progreso, Yoro
19:15 CST	Sánchez 14'; Morales 36'	Report	10' Andino; 87' Crisanto	Stadium: Estadio Humberto Micheletti; Attendance: 2,017; Referee: Nelson Salgado Starting XI: 19 – Rougier; 2 – Montes; 3 – Figueroa; 7 – Discua; 9 – Castillo; 10 – Andino (substituted off); 16 – Castellanos; 18 – W. Crisanto (substituted off); 22 – Vergara; 23 – Pucheta (substituted off); 24 – Elvir; Substitutes; 6 – Mayorquín (substituted on); 11 – Vega (substituted on); 27 – F. Crisanto (substituted on)

10 March 2017 Round 12	Motagua	1–1	Real España	Tegucigalpa, Francisco Morazán
20:00 CST	Andino 29'	Report	22' Acosta	Stadium: Estadio Tiburcio Carías Andino; Attendance: 3,943; Referee: Raúl Castro Starting XI: 19 – Rougier; 2 – Montes; 3 – Figueroa; 7 – Discua; 9 – Castillo; 10 – Andino (substituted off) 72'; 14 – Reyna; 16 – Castellanos; 18 – Crisanto; 24 – Elvir (substituted off) 76'; 35 – Meléndez (substituted off) 63'; Substitutes; 17 – Maldonado (substituted on) 63'; 11 – Vega (substituted on) 72'; 31 – Bernárdez (substituted on) 76'

19 April 2017 Round 13	Vida	0–1	Motagua	La Ceiba, Atlántida
19:00 CST		Report	79' Pereira	Stadium: Estadio Nilmo Edwards; Attendance: 2,152; Referee: Raúl Castro Starting XI: 19 – Rougier; 2 – Montes; 3 – Figueroa; 5 – Pereira; 6 – Mayorquín (substituted off) 60'; 7 – Discua; 9 – Castillo; 10 – Andino (substituted off) 72'; 16 – Castellanos; 24 – Elvir; 27 – Crisanto; Substitutes; 14 – Reyna (substituted on) 60'; 11 – Vega (substituted on) 72'

2 April 2017 Round 14	Motagua	1–1	Olimpia	Tegucigalpa, Francisco Morazán
16:00 CST	Crisanto 87' (pen.)	Report	39' López	Stadium: Estadio Tiburcio Carías Andino; Attendance: 6,440; Referee: Geovanny Mendoza Starting XI: 19 – Rougier; 2 – Montes; 3 – Figueroa; 5 – Pereira; 7 – Discua (substituted off) 80'; 9 – Castillo; 11 – Vega (substituted off) 31'; 14 – Reyna (substituted off) 46'; 16 – Castellanos; 24 – Elvir; 27 – F. Crisanto; Substitutes; 10 – Andino (substituted on) 31'; 6 – Mayorquín (substituted on) 46'; 18 – W. Crisanto (substituted on) 80'

9 April 2017 Round 15	Motagua	3–2	Juticalpa	Tegucigalpa, Francisco Morazán
16:00 CST	Castillo 13'; Discua 46'; Crisanto 57'	Report	42' (pen.) Lanza; 48' Aguilar	Stadium: Estadio Tiburcio Carías Andino; Attendance: 2,093; Referee: Héctor Rodríguez Starting XI: 19 – Rougier; 2 – Montes; 5 – Pereira; 6 – Mayorquín (substituted off) 78'; 7 – Discua; 9 – Castillo; 10 – Andino (substituted off) 89'; 16 – Castellanos; 24 – Elvir; 27 – Crisanto; 35 – Meléndez (substituted off) 70'; Substitutes; 34 – López (substituted on) 70'; 14 – Reyna (substituted on) 78'; 21 – Grant (substituted on) 89'

12 April 2017 Round 16	Marathón	1–2	Motagua	San Pedro Sula, Cortés
15:30 CST	Barboza 73'	Report	8' 78' Castillo	Stadium: Estadio Yankel Rosenthal; Attendance: 2,147; Referee: Óscar Moncada Starting XI: 19 – Rougier; 2 – Montes; 5 – Pereira; 6 – Mayorquín (substituted off) 78'; 7 – Discua; 9 – Castillo; 16 – Castellanos; 24 – Elvir; 27 – Crisanto; 31 – Bernárdez (substituted off) 86'; 35 – Meléndez (substituted off) 24'; Substitutes; 21 – Grant (substituted on) 24'; 14 – Reyna (substituted on) 78'; 34 – López (substituted on) 86'

23 April 2017 Round 17	Motagua	3–1	Real Sociedad	Tegucigalpa, Francisco Morazán
16:00 CST	Elvir 8'; Crisanto 78' (pen.); Vega 90'	Report	86' Solórzano	Stadium: Estadio Tiburcio Carías Andino; Attendance: 2,957; Referee: Armando Castro Starting XI: 19 – Rougier; 2 – Montes; 3 – Figueroa; 5 – Pereira; 6 – Mayorquín; 7 – Discua (substituted off) 90'; 9 – Castillo (substituted off) 50'; 10 – Andino; 16 – Castellanos; 24 – Elvir; 27 – F. Crisanto (substituted off) 66'; Substitutes; 11 – Vega (substituted on) 50'; 18 – W. Crisanto (substituted on) 66'; 34 – López (substituted on) 90'

29 April 2017 Round 18	Social Sol	2–2	Motagua	Olanchito, Yoro
15:30 CST	Riascos 27'; Lobo 83'	Report	45' (pen.) Discua; 84' López	Stadium: Estadio San Jorge; Attendance: 1,929; Referee: Melvin Matamoros Starting XI: 19 – Rougier; 2 – Montes; 3 – Figueroa; 5 – Pereira; 6 – Mayorquín; 7 – Discua (substituted off) 46'; 10 – Andino; 11 – Vega; 14 – Reyna; 24 – Elvir; 27 – Crisanto; Substitutes; 31 – Bernárdez (substituted on) 46'; 34 – López (substituted on)

11 May 2017 Semifinals	Real España	1–2	Motagua	San Pedro Sula, Cortés
19:00 CST	Cardozo 11'	Report	14' Discua; 87' López	Stadium: Estadio Francisco Morazán; Referee: Nelson Salgado Starting XI: 19 – Rougier; 2 – Montes; 3 – Figueroa; 5 – Pereira; 6 – Mayorquín; 7 – Discua; 10 – Andino (substituted off) 76'; 11 – Vega; 16 – Castellanos; 24 – Elvir; 27 – F. Crisanto (substituted off) 72'; Substitutes; 18 – W. Crisanto (substituted on) 72'; 34 – López (substituted on) 76'

14 May 2017 Semifinals	Motagua	2–2	Real España	Tegucigalpa, Francisco Morazán
16:00 CST	Mayorquín 80'; Elvir 88'	Report	17' Cardozo; 86' Tejeda	Stadium: Estadio Tiburcio Carías Andino; Referee: Raúl Castro Starting XI: 19 – Rougier; 2 – Montes; 3 – Figueroa; 5 – Pereira; 6 – Mayorquín (substituted off) 85'; 7 – Discua; 10 – Andino (substituted off); 11 – Vega; 16 – Castellanos; 24 – Elvir; 27 – F. Crisanto (substituted off) 63'; Substitutes; 18 – W. Crisanto (substituted on) 63'; 34 – López (substituted on); 14 – Reyna (substituted on) 85'

20 May 2017 Final	Honduras Progreso	1–4	Motagua	El Progreso, Yoro
19:15 CST	Morales 24'	Report	31' 90+4' Vega; 63' Andino; 69' Discua	Stadium: Estadio Humberto Micheletti; Referee: Óscar Moncada Starting XI: 19 – Rougier; 2 – Montes; 3 – Figueroa; 5 – Pereira; 6 – Mayorquín (substituted off) 75'; 7 – Discua; 10 – Andino (substituted off) 71'; 11 – Vega; 16 – Castellanos; 24 – Elvir; 27 – F. Crisanto (substituted off) 81'; Substitutes; 34 – López (substituted on) 71'; 14 – Reyna (substituted on) 75'; 18 – W. Crisanto (substituted on) 81'

28 May 2017 Final	Motagua	3–0	Honduras Progreso	Tegucigalpa, Francisco Morazán
16:00 CST	Andino 19' 49'; Discua 74'	Report		Stadium: Estadio Tiburcio Carías Andino; Attendance: 30,000; Referee: Melvin Matamoros Starting XI: 19 – Rougier; 2 – Montes; 3 – Figueroa; 5 – Pereira; 6 – Mayorquín; 7 – Discua; 10 – Andino (substituted off) 73'; 11 – Vega; 16 – Castellanos; 24 – Elvir (substituted off) 78'; 27 – F. Crisanto (substituted off) 68'; Substitutes; 18 – W. Crisanto (substituted on) 68'; 34 – López (substituted on) 73'; 31 – Bernárdez (substituted on) 78'

=== Honduran Cup ===
21 January 2017 Round of 64	Gremio	1–1 (5–3 p)	Motagua	Goascorán, Valle
16:00 CST	Bernárdez 52' (o.g.)		71' Vega	Stadium: Estadio Tommy Zambrano; Referee: Melvin Matamoros Starting XI: 25 – Licona; 2 – Montes; 6 – Mayorquín; 7 – Discua; 11 – Vega; 16 – Castellanos; 18 – Crisanto; 22 – Vergara; 23 – Pucheta; 31 – Bernárdez; 34 – López
	Penalties
	Donaire (penalty scored); Juárez (penalty scored); Mejía (penalty scored); Laínez (penalty scored) undisclosed (penalty scored)		(penalty scored) Crisanto; (penalty missed) Reyna; (penalty scored) Discua; (penalty scored) Vergara

=== By round ===
Round	1	2	3	4	5	6	7	8	9	10	11	12	13	14	15	16	17	18	19	20	21	22	23	24	25	26	27	28	29	30	31	32	33	34	35	36
Ground	A	H	A	H	A	H	A	H	A	H	A	H	A	H	A	H	A	H	A	H	A	H	A	A	H	A	H	H	A	H	A	H	H	A	H	A
Result	W	W	D	W	L	W	L	D	W	D	D	D	L	D	L	W	D	W	L	W	D	W	D	D	W	L	W	W	D	D	W	D	W	W	W	D
Position	1	1	1	1	2	1	3	3	3	3	3	4	4	4	4	4	4	4	4	4	4	4	4	4	4	4	4	4	3	3	3	3	3	3	3	3

A = Away; H = Home; W = Win; D = Draw; L = Loss

== Statistics ==
- As of 28 May 2017

Competition	GP	GW	GD	GL	GS	GC	GD	CS	SG	Per
League	46	22	17	7	83	54	+29	15	4	60.14%
Cup	1	0	1	0	1	1	0	0	0	33.33%
Others	8	5	1	2	20	10	+10	2	2	66.67%
Totals	55	27	19	9	104	65	+39	17	6	60.61%
