= César Romero (footballer, born 1999) =

Honduran footballer

Personal information
- Full name: César Miguel Romero Moncada
- Date of birth: 19 January 1999 (age 27)
- Place of birth: Tegucigalpa, Honduras
- Height: 5 ft 11 in (1.80 m)
- Position: Forward

Team information
- Current team: Real de Minas (on loan from Motagua)

Senior career*
Years	Team	Apps	(Gls)
2017–	Motagua	3	(0)
2019	→ Colorado Springs Switchbacks (loan)	18	(2)
2020–	→ Real de Minas (loan)	3	(0)

International career^{‡}
2018–2019	Honduras U20	7	(2)
- * Club domestic league appearances and goals as of 30 March 2020 ‡ National team caps and goals as of 31 March 2020

César Miguel Romero Moncada (born 19 January 1999) is a Honduran footballer who plays as a forward for C.D. Real de Minas in the Liga Salva Vida on loan from F.C. Motagua.

== Career ==
=== Motagua ===
A product of Motagua's youth academy, Romero made his league debut for the club on 15 January 2017, coming on as a 78th-minute substitute for Kevin López in a 3–1 home victory over Honduras Progreso. He was included on the bench in a grand total of five matches during the 2016–17 season, with just one more of those resulting in an appearance. That was a five-minute stint having replaced Marco Tulio Vega in a 2–0 victory over Marathón on February 12.

During the 2017–18 season, Romero made just one first-team league appearance, which was also his first start for the club in the league. He tallied 53 minutes in a 1–0 away victory over Juticalpa on 14 February 2018, being replaced by Erick Andino.

=== Colorado Springs Switchbacks ===
In March 2019, Romero was loaned to Colorado Springs Switchbacks of the USL Championship ahead of the 2019 season. Romero missed the first two matches of the 2019 season as his loan move wasn't completed in time, so he made his debut for the club on 23 March 2019 in a 1–0 victory over San Antonio. He made a near-instant impact, scoring the match's lone goal in the 86th minute with a long-range effort just four minutes after coming on in place of Mike Seth. Romero made another substitute appearance the next week against Phoenix Rising before being awarded a start against Orange County on April 6, his first for the club. He registered 67 minutes before being replaced by Kwasi Donsu. He made three more appearances for the club, one start and two subs, before leaving for the U-20 World Cup.

Romero's first appearance back from the U-20 World Cup was a ten-minute substitute appearance on 13 July 2019 in a 1–0 home victory over Tulsa. Two days later, Romero was included in the Colorado Rapids squad for a 3-0 friendly defeat against Arsenal, coming on in the 78th minute for Kofi Opare.

Throughout the remainder of his loan, Romero made three more starts, against Real Monarchs on August 2, Austin Bold on September 7, and New Mexico United the week after. Romero scored his second and final goal of the loan in that start against Austin Bold, in the 41st minute of a 1–1 draw.

=== Real de Minas ===
In January 2020, Romero was loaned out to Honduran club Real de Minas. He made his league debut for the club on 8 February 2020, coming on as a late substitute for Christian Persie in a 1–1 draw with Vida.

=== International ===
Romero was included in the Honduras squad for the 2019 FIFA U-20 World Cup. He made a substitute appearance in the opening match of the group stage, coming on as a 66th-minute substitute for Luis Palma in a 5–0 defeat to New Zealand. He started the second match, a 2–0 defeat to Uruguay, but wasn't involved in the final group match, the 12–0 defeat to Norway.
