= Behrman Stadium =

Stadium in New Orleans

Coordinates: 29°56′38″N 90°1′47″W

Martin Behrman Stadium
- Behrman stadium
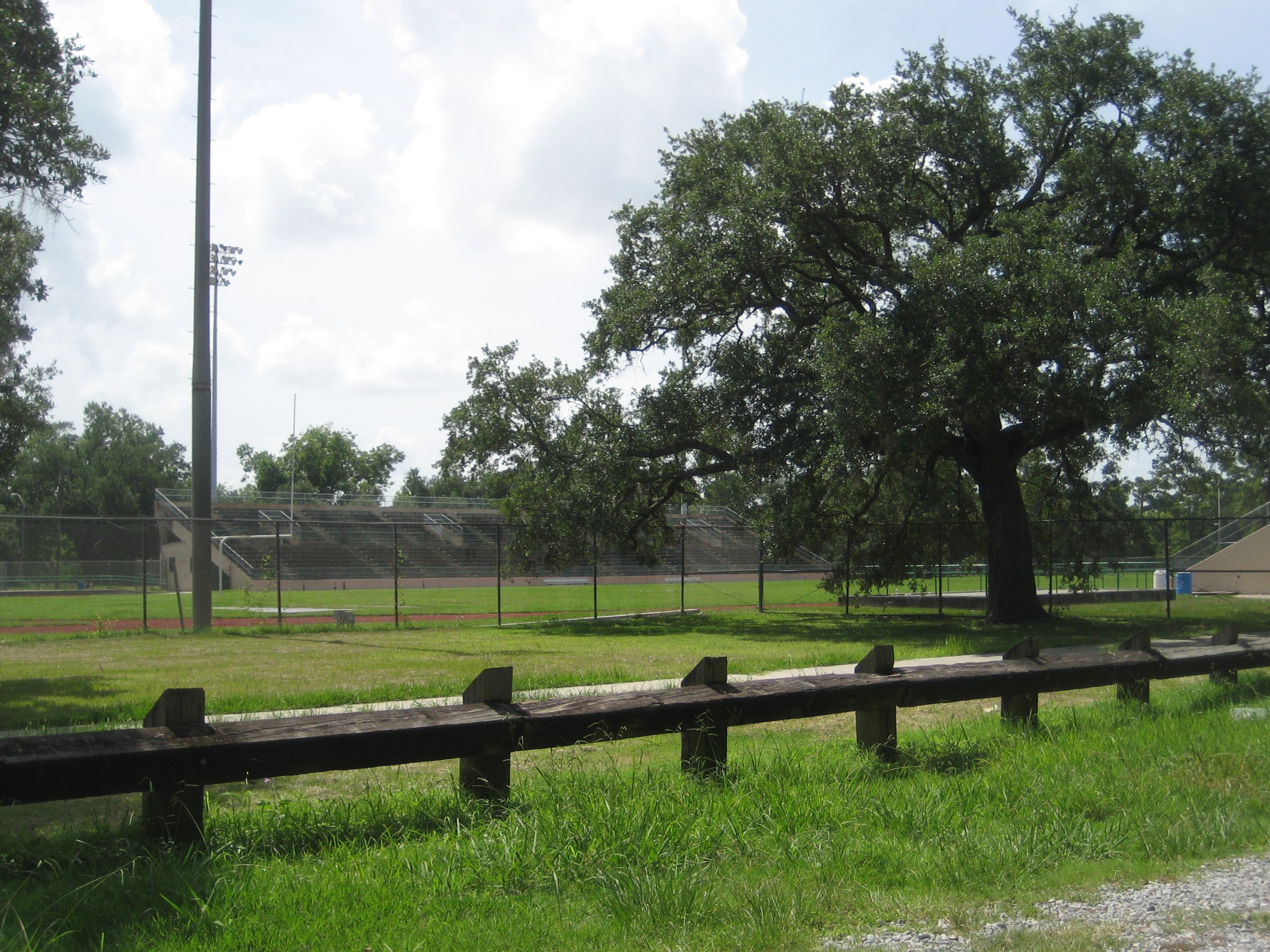
- Interactive map of Martin Behrman Stadium
- Owner: New Orleans Recreation Department
- Operator: New Orleans Recreation Department
- Capacity: 5,000
- Surface: GameDay Grass from AstroTurf

Construction
- Groundbreaking: 1938
- Opened: 1938
- Renovated: 2011, 2015

Behrman Stadium is a sports playing facility located in Algiers, New Orleans. It is a 5,000-seat stadium with standing-room only areas in the end zone.

== History ==
Behrman stadium opened in 1938 and is the second-oldest prep facility in New Orleans behind City Park's Tad Gormley Stadium, which was built in 1937. It is named for former five-term New Orleans Mayor Martin Behrman and was built by the Works Progress Administration. The stadium is operated by the New Orleans Recreation Department (NORD) with a neighborhood-based booster club supporting the facility. A track surrounds the playing field and there is a community pool, gymnasium and tennis courts in surrounding Behrman Park. Sports camps are held at the park during the summer, including: tennis, dance and cheerleading.

During the response to Hurricane Katrina in 2005, elements of the U.S. Army's First Cavalry Division used the stadium as a staging area to support a number of evacuation, security, and clean-up operations. The American Red Cross took advantage of the safety provided by the troops to set up a humanitarian aide distribution point.

The stadium was originally home to former high schools, Holy Name of Mary, Behrman High School (which later became O. P. Walker) and L.B. Landry High school. The stadium currently serves Edna Karr and Landry-Walker High Schools. It is also the place where LSU and AFL great Billy Cannon once ran high school track and field and where L.B. Landry coach Felix "Zoo" James stood up for racial equality; making the Landry football team the first predominantly African American high school to call the facility home in the early 1960s. Famous footballers who played here in their early years include: former Miami Dolphins All-Pro cornerback Patrick Surtain, former LSU quarterback Herb Tyler, Saints former cornerback Keenan Lewis and Dolphins receiver Mike Wallace.

== Conditions ==
For years the stadium has been in bad condition with dirty and rusty stands. Its bleachers, made of wood and fiberglass, where broken and ragged. The football field was full of holes that officials pointed out the hazardous spots for maintenance men to fill in before games in 1995. It was not until 2011 that funding improved when a partnership of the NFL Youth Football Fund, the New Orleans Saints and the Local Initiatives Support Corporation (LISC) issued a grant for renovation including synthetic turf and digital play clocks.

== Security and Public Safety ==
Due to the stadium being located in an area riddled with violence, it became the main site for numerous shootouts, post athletic games. Before renovations, the lack of a police presence was common which enabled criminals to carry fire arms into the stadium. The first shooting happened on the night of September 28, 1979, after a football game. A 17-year-old boy was shot multiple times outside the Stadium. Years later, Security presents around the stadium increased.
