= Klifox Bernárdez =

Honduran football player (born 1994)

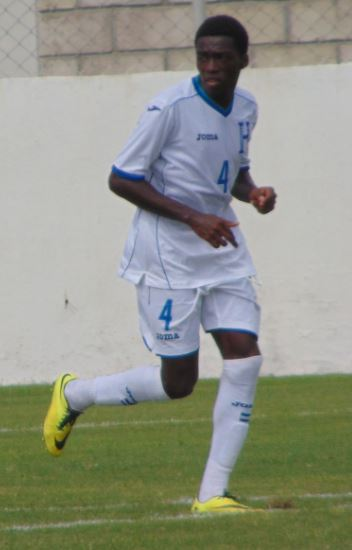

Personal information
- Full name: Klifox Oniel Bernárdez Valerio
- Date of birth: 18 September 1994 (age 32)
- Place of birth: La Ceiba, Honduras
- Height: 1.79 m (5 ft 10 1/2 in)
- Position: Left back

Team information
- Current team: C.D. Real Sociedad

Senior career*
Years	Team	Apps	(Gls)
2014–2020	Motagua	47	(0)
2020–2021	C.D. Real de Minas		
2021–	C.D. Real Sociedad		

International career^{‡}
2015	Honduras U-23	2	(0)
- * Club domestic league appearances and goals as of 8 December 2019 ‡ National team caps and goals as of 13 October 2015

Klifox Oniel Bernárdez Valerio (born 18 September 1994) is a Honduran footballer who plays as a left back for C.D. Real Sociedad in the Honduran top division.

== Club career ==
=== Motagua ===
At the age of 19, Bernárdez made his professional debut with F.C. Motagua on 3 August 2014 in the 1–1 away draw against C.D. Real Sociedad in Tocoa. In 2015, he was almost signed by Juticalpa F.C., however, the transfer did not take place. In January 2019, he was announced as a new signing for Juticalpa, however, since he had already played a game for F.C. Motagua Reserves that season, the transfer could not be finalized, making this the second time his transfer to this club is frustrated.

== International career ==
=== Under-23 ===
In 2015, Bernárdez represented Honduras at the 2015 CONCACAF Men's Olympic Qualifying Championship, a team which eventually qualified to the 2016 Summer Olympics.
