= Martín Pucheta =

Argentine footballer

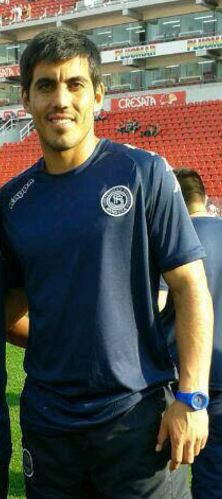

Personal information
- Full name: Martín Ariel Pucheta
- Date of birth: 10 February 1988 (age 38)
- Place of birth: Córdoba, Argentina
- Height: 1.83 m (6 ft 0 in)
- Position: Centre back

Senior career*
| Years | Team | Apps | (Gls) |
| 2009–2010 | Racing Club | | |
| 2010–2011 | Los Andes | | |
| 2011–2012 | Acassuso | | |
| 2012 | Huracán Las Heras | | |
| 2013 | Andes Talleres | | |
| 2013–2015 | Independiente Rivadavia | 14 | (1) |
| 2015 | Gutiérrez | 28 | (4) |
| 2016 | Deportivo Maipú | 10 | (0) |
| 2016–2017 | Motagua | 19 | (0) |
| 2017–2018 | San Lorenzo de Alem | 20 | (0) |
| 2018–2020 | Douglas Haig | 16 | (0) |
| 2020–2021 | Sportivo Peñarol | 6 | (0) |
| 2021–2022 | Racing de Córdoba | 24 | (2) |
| 2022–2023 | Sarmiento de Resistencia | 12 | (1) |
| 2023–2024 | Club Olimpo | 15 | (1) |
| 2024–2025 | Ciudad Bolívar | 29 | (1) |
- * Club domestic league appearances and goals as of 14:13, 06 January 2026 (UTC)

Martín Ariel Pucheta (born February 10, 1988) is an Argentine footballer who plays as a Centre back. He is currently without a team.

== Career ==
His beginnings as a professional player took place in the youth teams of Talleres and Belgrano. In 2009, he made his debut with Racing de Avellaneda first division squad, under the coaching of Ricardo Caruso Lombardi, and was assigned the number 14 jersey.

After the 2009 Clausura Tournament, due to the limited opportunities he received with the squad managed by Caruso Lombardi, his name sparked great interest in Nacional de Montevideo. However, Pucheta remained with Racing for another year.

For the 2013/14 season, his signing was announced for Independiente Rivadavia, a club in the Primera Nacional. He made his debut on August 19, 2013, against San Martín de San Juan, in the third round of the Torneo Inicial, in a match played at the Ingeniero Hilario Sánchez Stadium in San Juan. The match ended 4–3 in favor of San Martín.

On June 8, 2016, his signing with Motagua was confirmed, at the express request of his manager, Diego Vásquez.

In January 2024, he joined Ciudad Bolívar in the Torneo Federal A, where he signed a one-year contract.

== Honours ==
FC Motagua

- Liga Hondubet : 2016, 2017

Ciudad Bolívar

- Torneo Federal A : 2025
