= Wilmer Crisanto =

Honduran footballer (born 1989)

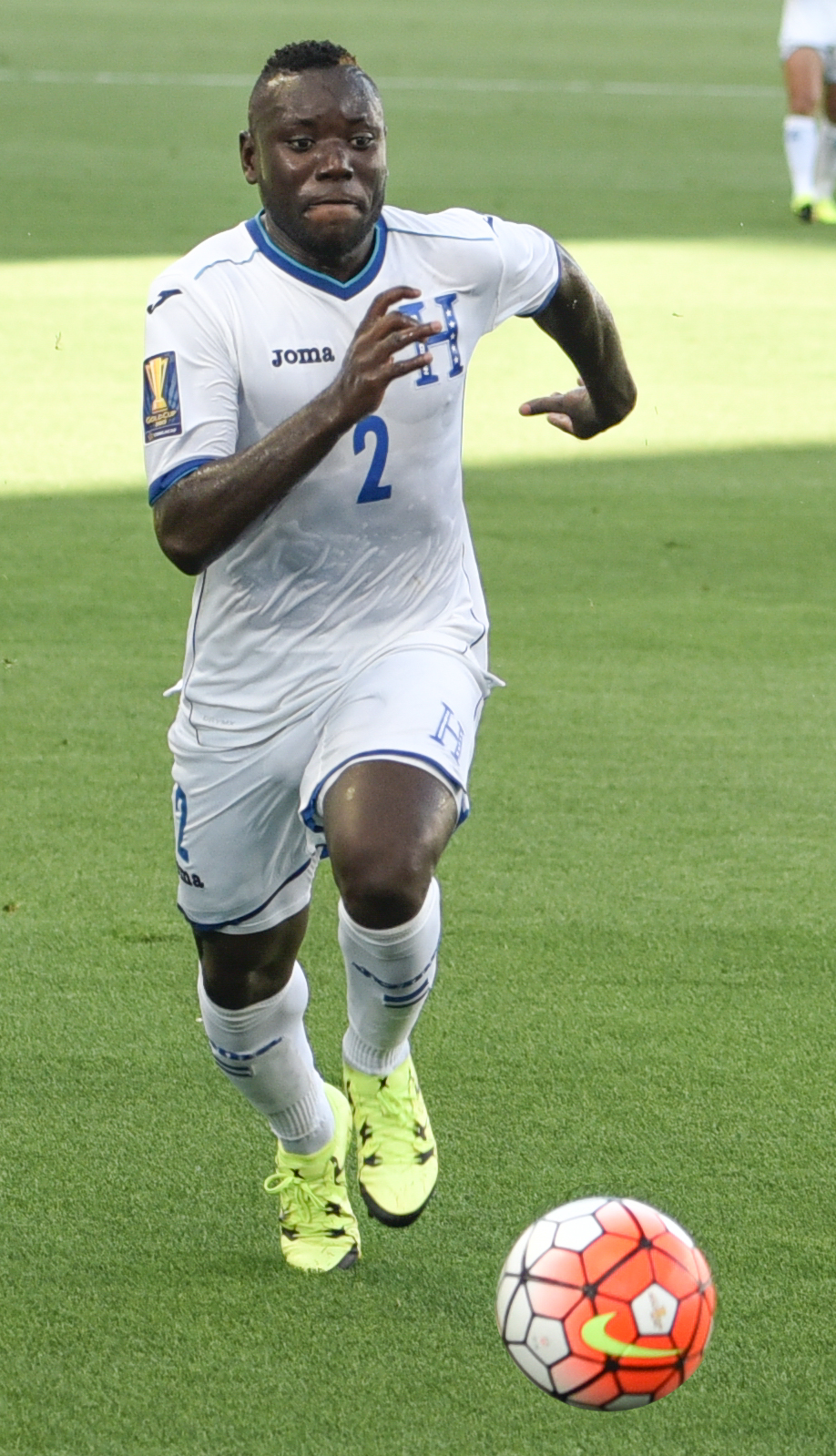
- Wilmer Crisanto with the Honduras national football team

Personal information
- Full name: Wilmer Crisanto Casildo
- Date of birth: 24 June 1989 (age 37)
- Place of birth: La Ceiba, Honduras
- Height: 1.75 m (5 ft 9 in)
- Position: Defender

Team information
- Current team: Marathón

Youth career
- 1999–2007: Victoria Reserves

Senior career*
Years	Team	Apps	(Gls)
2007–2008	Victoria	36	(1)
2008–2009	→ Godoy Cruz (loan)	0	(0)
2010–2014	Victoria	109	(5)
2014–2021	Motagua	209	(16)
2021–	Marathón	12	(0)

International career^{‡}
2005–2006	Honduras U17	7	(0)
2008–2009	Honduras U20	5	(0)
2012	Honduras U23	8	(0)
2010–2016	Honduras	24	(0)
Medal record
Honduras
Third place	CONCACAF U-20 Championship	2009
- * Club domestic league appearances and goals as of 05:11, 21 May 2021 (UTC) ‡ National team caps and goals as of 15 January 2023

Wilmer Crisanto Casildo (born 24 June 1989) is a Honduran professional football player, who plays as right back for Marathón in the Honduran National League.

== Club career ==
He became a regular in the starting lineup for C.D. Victoria when he was only 18 years old. He usually played right defender, but could also play as a defensive midfielder or a central defender. He played almost every match of the 2007–08 season where he got thirty caps and scored one goal.

After several years with Victoria (in their youth system and the first team), Crisanto sparked the interest of First Division club in Argentina, Godoy Cruz. The team found out about the young player after his teammate at Victoria, Diego Vázquez, suggested him to the directors at the club. The next week, Wilmer Crisanto was invited for a 15-day trial at the club. After impressing the coaches, his contract was finally signed. He was acquired on loan for six months by the team.

Crisanto playing for the reserves of Godoy Cruz during their match against Newell's Old Boys in 2008

He made his debut for Godoy Cruz with the reserves in a match against Newell's Old Boys on 21 October 2008, when he came on during the second half. He played a great match and was congratulated the next day on the team's website.

Despite his impressive season with the reserves, the team chose not to buy the player after his six-month trial, and on 18 December 2008 he returned to Honduras to play with the team that had seen him take shape, Victoria of his hometown La Ceiba. In 2014, he signed for F.C. Motagua of the most important team in Honduras.

== International career ==
Crisanto participated in the Honduran U-17s and played for the Honduras U20's at the 2009 FIFA U-20 World Cup in Cairo, Egypt. He also played for the Honduras U23s at the 2012 Summer Olympics.

He made his senior debut for Honduras in a November 2010 friendly match against Panama and had earned, as of December 2012, a total of six caps, scoring no goals. He went on to represent Honduras in multiple World Cup Qualifier matches and the 2015 CONCACAF Gold Cup.

== Personal life ==
Crisanto stated in an interview with Diario Deportivo Diez that his idol is Eduardo Bennett because of the success he had while playing in Argentina from 1993 to 2002 with Argentinos Juniors, San Lorenzo (Champions in 1995) and Quilmes.
