= Juan Pablo Montes =

Honduran footballer (born 1985)

Personal information
- Full name: Juan Pablo Montes Montes
- Date of birth: 26 October 1985 (age 41)
- Place of birth: Sulaco, Honduras
- Height: 1.91 m (6 ft 3 in)
- Position: Defender

Senior career*
Years	Team	Apps	(Gls)
2006–2007	Atlético Olanchano		
2007–2011	Victoria	51	(1)
2011	Vida	0	(0)
2012	Necaxa	0	(0)
2012–2013	Platense	0	(0)
2013–2021	Motagua	258	(14)
2021-2022	C.D.S. Vida	18	(1)
2022–2025	C.D. Olimpia	18	(1)

International career^{‡}
2013–2015	Honduras	16	(2)
- * Club domestic league appearances and goals as of 28 June 2021 ‡ National team caps and goals as of 4 February 2015

Juan Pablo Montes Montes (born 26 October 1985) is a Honduran football player who plays as a defender.

== Club career ==
Montes started his career at Atlético Olanchano, then had a three year-spell at Victoria. He joined Vida in summer 2011 but was out for the season due to a broken foot. Montes moved on to Necaxa in January 2012 and then Platense, changing clubs every season since leaving Victoria.

He joined F.C. Motagua for the 2013–14 season, where he has won several championships. He was nominated in the Best XI at the 2018 CONCACAF Awards.

== International career ==
Montes made his debut for Honduras in a January 2013 Copa Centroamericana match against El Salvador. As of February 2015, Montes has earned a total of sixteen caps, scoring twice.

=== International goals ===
Scores and results list Honduras' goal tally first.

N.	Date	Venue	Opponent	Score	Result	Competition
1.	22 January 2013	Estadio Nacional, San José, Costa Rica	Panama	1–1	1–1	2013 Copa Centroamericana
2.	4 February 2015	Estadio Olímpico Metropolitano, San Pedro Sula, Honduras	Venezuela	2–3	2–3	Friendly
