= Héctor Castellanos =

Honduran footballer (born 1992)

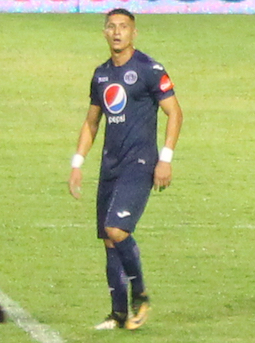
- Castellanos with Motagua

Personal information
- Full name: Héctor Enrique Castellanos Villatoro
- Date of birth: 28 December 1992 (age 33)
- Place of birth: Tela, Honduras
- Height: 1.73 m (5 ft 8 in)
- Position: Midfielder

Team information
- Current team: Estrella FC Santos Guardiola
- Number: 16

Senior career*
Years	Team	Apps	(Gls)
2012–2015	Victoria	95	(0)
2015–2023	Motagua	182	(2)
2023	Olancho FC	17	(0)
2024-2025	Motagua	38	(0)
2025	Policía Nacional	16	(0)
2026	Juticalpa	8	(0)
	Estrella FC Santos Guardiola	5	(0)

International career^{‡}
2019–	Honduras	5	(0)
- * Club domestic league appearances and goals as of 20 March 2026 ‡ National team caps and goals as of 10 October 2020

Héctor Enrique Castellanos Villatoro (born 28 December 1992) is a Honduran professional footballer who plays as a midfielder for Estrella FC Santos Guardiola in the Liga de Ascenso.

== Club career ==
=== Victoria ===
At the age of 20, Castellanos made his debut with C.D. Victoria in the 2–1 victory over F.C. Motagua on 29 July 2012. Playing for Victoria, he reached a final in the 2012–13 season, which they lost to Club Deportivo Olimpia.

=== Motagua ===
Castellanos signed for F.C. Motagua on 24 June 2015. His first game with Motagua was against Mexican side Club América for the 2015–16 CONCACAF Champions League where they lost 0–4. His league debut came four days later in the 5–1 victory over his former club C.D. Victoria.

=== Olancho FC ===
On 1 July 2023 Castellanos signed as a free transfer with Olancho FC and competed in 17 games.

=== Motagua ===
Castellanos returned to F.C. Motagua on 5 January 2024 and competed in 38 games.

=== Policía Nacional ===
On 17 June 2025 Castellanos signed for Policía Nacional FC and competed in 16 games.

=== Juticalpa ===
On 2 March 2026 Castellanos signed for Juticalpa FC appearing in 8 matches.

=== Estrella FC Santos Guardiola ===
On 23 August 2026 Castellanos signed for Estrella FC Santos Guardiola of the Liga de Ascenso in Honduras.

== International ==
He made his Honduras national football team on 9 June 2019 in a friendly against Brazil, as a 72nd-minute substitute for Luis Garrido.
