= Harold Fonseca =

Honduran footballer (born 1993)

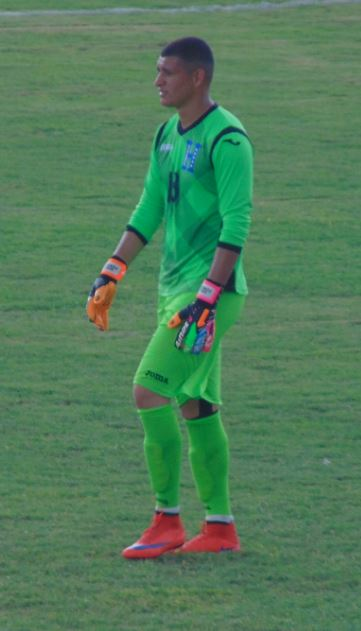

Personal information
- Full name: Harold Geovanny Fonseca Baca
- Date of birth: 8 October 1993 (age 33)
- Place of birth: Tegucigalpa, Honduras
- Height: 1.86 m (6 ft 1 in)
- Position: Goalkeeper

Team information
- Current team: Olancho FC
- Number: 1

Youth career
- Motagua

Senior career*
Years	Team	Apps	(Gls)
2014–2019	Motagua	23	(0)
2015–2016	→ Juticalpa (loan)	24	(0)
2019	Vida	9	(0)
2019–2020	Olimpia	21	(0)
2021	Marathón	4	(0)
2022	Victoria	37	(0)
2023–	Olancho FC	0	(0)

International career^{‡}
2007	Honduras U17	3	(0)
2016	Honduras U23	2	(0)
2018–	Honduras	3	(0)
- * Club domestic league appearances and goals as of 24 December 2022 ‡ National team caps and goals as of 24 December 2022

Harold Geovanny Fonseca Baca (born 8 October 1993) is a Honduran professional footballer who plays as a goalkeeper for Olancho FC and the Honduras national team.
