= Reinieri Mayorquín =

Honduran footballer (born 1989)

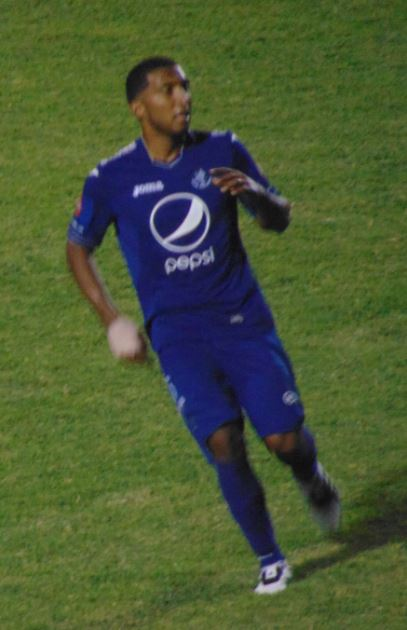

Personal information
- Full name: Reinieri Joel Mayorquín Gámez
- Date of birth: 13 July 1989 (age 37)
- Place of birth: San Pedro Sula, Honduras
- Height: 1.77 m (5 ft 10 in)
- Position: Midfielder

Senior career*
| Years | Team | Apps | (Gls) |
| 2007–2013 | Marathón | 131 | (1) |
| 2009 | → Aalesund (loan) | 4 | (0) |
| 2013 | Lepaera | 14 | (0) |
| 2014–2021 | Motagua | 215 | (13) |

International career
| 2008 | Honduras U-20 | 6 | (0) |
Medal record
Honduras
| Third place | CONCACAF U-20 Championship | 2009 |
- * Club domestic league appearances and goals as of 7 June 2021

Reinieri Joel Mayorquín Gámez (born 13 July 1989) is a Honduran football player who most recently played for F.C. Motagua. He has previously played for Norwegian club Aalesunds FK.

== Club career ==
=== Aalesunds FK ===
Mayorquín joined Aalesund on a season-long loan-deal in March 2009. He played in the first three cup-matches in the 2009 Norwegian Football Cup, which Aalesund won, and impressed head coach Kjetil Rekdal in the second round tie against Kristiansund BK.

Mayorquín made his debut in Tippeligaen on 1 June 2009, coming off the bench in a 2–1 win at Sandefjord, but Aalesund did not want to use the option to sign him permanently so he returned to Marathón. Mayorquín made four appearances as a substitute in Tippeligaen.

== International career ==
Mayorquín played at the 2009 FIFA World Youth Championship in Egypt.
