= Marco Tulio Vega =

Honduran footballer (born 1988)

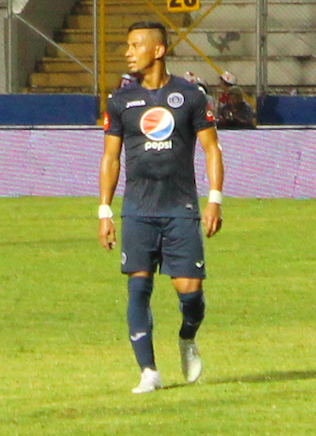
- Vega with Motagua

Personal information
- Full name: Marco Tulio Vega Ordóñez
- Date of birth: 14 April 1988 (age 38)
- Place of birth: Sonaguera, Honduras
- Height: 1.76 m (5 ft 9 in)
- Position: Forward

Team information
- Current team: Real Sociedad
- Number: 9

Senior career*
Years	Team	Apps	(Gls)
2007–2010	Sonaguera		
2011	Yoro		
2011–2015	Marathón	73	(19)
2015–2016	Real Sociedad	41	(25)
2016–2021	Motagua	139	(28)
2022–2023	Victoria	37	(9)
2023–	Real Sociedad		

International career^{‡}
2011–2016	Honduras	4	(0)
- * Club domestic league appearances and goals as of 19 May 2021 ‡ National team caps and goals as of 9 October 2017

Marco Tulio Vega Ordoñez (born 14 April 1988) is a Honduran professional footballer who plays as a forward for Real Sociedad.

== Club career ==
Vega started his career at second division side Sonaguera and then Yoro before joining top level Marathón as their first signing in summer 2011. On 7 August 2011 he played his first game in the Honduran first division scoring his first two goals against Deportes Savio.

== International career ==
Vega made his debut for Honduras in a September 2011 friendly match against Paraguay and has earned, as of February 2013. On 28 May 2016, Vega has played for Honduras against Argentina in an International Friendly.
