= Erick Andino =

Honduran footballer (born 1989)

Personal information
- Full name: Erick Salvador Andino Portillo
- Date of birth: 21 July 1989 (age 37)
- Place of birth: San Pedro Sula, Honduras
- Position: Midfielder

Senior career*
Years	Team	Apps	(Gls)
2010–2011	Olimpia		
2012	Victoria		
2012–2014	Olimpia	4	(0)
2014–2015	Victoria	48	(17)
2015–2020	Motagua	127	(34)
2022	Guastatoya	0	(0)

International career^{‡}
2008–2009	Honduras U20	6	(2)
2015–2017	Honduras	24	(6)
Medal record
Honduras
Third place	CONCACAF U-20 Championship	2009
- * Club domestic league appearances and goals as of 22 August 2020 ‡ National team caps and goals as of 15 January 2023

Erick Salvador Andino Portillo (born 21 July 1989) is a Honduran football player.

== Club career ==
Andino joined Victoria from Olimpia in January 2012, but returned for the 2012 Apertura and was ruled out for the season with a knee injury.

== International career ==
Andino played for Honduras at the 2009 FIFA U-20 World Cup in Egypt.

=== International goals ===
Scores and results list Honduras' goal tally first.

Goal	Date	Venue	Opponent	Score	Result	Competition
1.	4 September 2015	Polideportivo Cachamay, Ciudad Guayana, Venezuela	Venezuela	1–0	3–0	Friendly
2.	13 October 2015	Estadio Olímpico Metropolitano, San Pedro Sula, Honduras	South Africa	1–1	1–1	Friendly
3.	13 January 2017	Estadio Rommel Fernández, Panama City, Panama	Nicaragua	2–1	2–1	2017 Copa Centroamericana
4.	20 January 2017	Estadio Rommel Fernández, Panama City, Panama	Costa Rica	1–0	1–1	2017 Copa Centroamericana
5.	22 February 2017	Estadio George Capwell, Guayaquil, Ecuador	Ecuador	1–0	1–3	Friendly
6.	16 March 2017	Estadio Francisco Morazán, San Pedro Sula, Honduras	Nicaragua	2–0	2–0	Friendly
