= 2017–18 C.D. Marathón season =

Marathón
2017–18 season
- Chairman: Orinson Amaya
- Manager: Héctor Vargas
- Stadium: Estadio Yankel Rosenthal
- Apertura: 1st - Semi-finals
- Clausura: 1st - Champions
- Cup: Not played
- Supercup: Runners-up
- Top goalscorer: League: Arboleda (24); All: Arboleda (24)
- Highest home attendance: 9,200 vs. Motagua (19 May 2019)
Home colours
- All statistics correct as of 16 October 2017.

The 2017–18 season was C.D. Marathón's 67th season in existence and the club's 52nd consecutive season in the top fight of Honduran football. The club got their 9th league title, ending an 8-year drought without league title. They also competed for the 2017 Honduran Supercup, ending as runner-ups.

== Overview ==
Héctor Vargas was hired as new coach, after Manuel Keosseián resigned on June 6.

== Apertura ==
=== Squad ===
Note: Flags indicate national team as defined under FIFA eligibility rules; some limited exceptions apply. Players may hold more than one non-FIFA nationality.

No.	Pos.	Nation	Player
1	GK	HON	John Bodden
29	GK	PAN	José Calderón
–	GK	HON	Denovan Torres
2	DF	HON	Bryan Barrios
12	DF	HON	Carlos Perdomo
4	DF	BRA	Caué Fernández
23	DF	HON	Johnny Leverón
21	DF	HON	Daniel Tejeda
3	DF	HON	Samuel Córdova
15	DF	HON	Kevin Espinoza
16	MF	HON	Allan Banegas
17	MF	HON	Wilmer Fuentes
38	MF	HON	Bryan Martínez
48	MF	HON	Cristian Cálix

No.	Pos.	Nation	Player
19	MF	HON	Mario Berríos
10	MF	HON	Joshua Vargas
6	MF	HON	John Paul Suazo
7	MF	HON	Juan Josué Rodríguez
28	MF	HON	Carlos Benedith
33	MF	HON	Óscar González
11	MF	HON	Víctor Berríos
20	MF	HON	Erick Arias
27	FW	COL	Justin Arboleda
24	FW	CUB	Yaudel Lahera
8	FW	HON	Júnior Lacayo
14	FW	HON	Darvis Argueta
22	FW	HON	Henry Romero
58	FW	HON	Bryan Castillo

=== Standings ===
Pos	Team	Pld	W	D	L	GF	GA	GD	Pts	Qualification or relegation
1	Marathón	18	11	1	6	27	21	+6	34	Qualification to the Semifinals
2	Motagua	18	9	6	3	31	21	+10	33	Qualification to the Semifinals
3	Olimpia	18	9	4	5	27	15	+12	31	Qualification to the Second round
4	Real España	18	9	2	7	31	25	+6	29	Qualification to the Second round
5	Juticalpa	18	8	4	6	39	30	+9	28	Qualification to the Second round

Updated to match(es) played on 23 November 2017. Source:

=== Matches ===
==== Results by round ====
Round	1	2	3	4	5	6	7	8	9	10	11	12	13	14	15	16	17	18
Ground	A	H	A	H	A	A	H	A	H	H	A	H	A	H	H	H	A	A
Result	D	W	L	W	L	L	W	W	W	W	W	L	L	W	W	W	W	L

Updated to match(es) played on 23 November 2017. Source:
A = Away; H = Home; W = Win; D = Draw; L = Loss

==== Regular season ====
6 August 2017 Round 1	Vida	1 – 1	Marathón	La Ceiba, Atlántida
15:00	Valerio 75'	Report	Arboleda 63'	Stadium: Estadio Nilmo Edwards; Referee: Héctor Rodríguez

12 August 2017 Round 2	Marathón	1 – 0	Platense	San Pedro Sula, Cortés Department
15:30	Arboleda 90+4'	Report		Stadium: Estadio Yankel Rosenthal; Referee: Raúl Castro

2 September 2017 Round 3	Motagua	1 – 0	Marathón	Comayagua, Comayagua
18:00	Vega 44'	Report		Stadium: Estadio Carlos Miranda; Referee: Nelson Salgado

26 August 2017 Round 4	Marathón	3 – 2	Juticalpa	San Pedro Sula, Cortés
15:30	Lacayo 82' 90'; Lahera 86'	Report	Tinoco 25'; Lanza 78' (pen.)	Stadium: Estadio Yankel Rosenthal; Referee: Armando Castro

9 September 2017 Round 5	Real España	4 – 0	Marathón	San Pedro Sula, Cortés
19:00	Zalazar 41' (pen.); Altamirano 73' 90'; López 90+1'	Report		Stadium: Estadio Francisco Morazán; Referee: Saíd Martínez

13 September 2017 Round 6	Honduras Progreso	4 – 3	Marathón	El Progreso, Yoro
19:15	López 11'; Barrios 33'; Sánchez 73'; Britto 80'	Report	Rodríguez 4' (pen.); Arboleda 10'; Banegas 83'	Stadium: Estadio Humberto Micheletti; Referee: Melvin Matamoros

17 September 2017 Round 7	Marathón	3 – 2	Olimpia	San Pedro Sula, Cortés
15:30	Arboleda 48' 74'; Cálix 69'	Report	Costly 14'; Méndez 19'	Stadium: Estadio Yankel Rosenthal; Referee: Héctor Rodríguez

23 September 2017 Round 8	Lobos UPNFM	0 – 1	Marathón	Tegucigalpa, Francisco Morazán
16:00		Report	Vargas 28'	Stadium: Estadio Tiburcio Carías Andino; Referee: Armando Castro

27 September 2017 Round 9	Marathón	2 – 0	Real Sociedad	San Pedro Sula, Cortés
15:30	Leverón 17'; Cálix 64'	Report		Stadium: Estadio Yankel Rosenthal; Referee: Ángel Cruz

30 September 2017 Round 10	Marathón	1 – 0	Vida	San Pedro Sula, Cortés
15:30	Arboleda 39'	Report		Stadium: Estadio Yankel Rosenthal; Referee: Saíd Martínez

15 October 2017 Round 11	Platense	0 – 3	Marathón	Puerto Cortés, Cortés
15:00		Report	Arboleda 39' (pen.); Lahera 78'; Lacayo 88'	Stadium: Estadio Excélsior; Referee: Héctor Rodríguez

21 October 2017 Round 12	Marathón	1 – 2	Motagua	San Pedro Sula, Cortés
19:00	Arboleda 45+3' (pen.)	Report	Castillo 79'; Crisanto 89'	Stadium: Estadio Yankel Rosenthal; Referee: Óscar Moncada

25 October 2017 Round 13	Juticalpa	3 – 0	Marathón	Juticalpa, Olancho
19:00	Tinoco 42'; Lanza 45+1'; Güity 85'	Report		Stadium: Estadio Juan Ramón Brevé Vargas; Referee: Orlando Hernández

29 October 2017 Round 14	Marathón	1 – 0	Real España	San Pedro Sula, Cortés
15:00	Lahera 64'	Report		Stadium: Estadio Yankel Rosenthal; Referee: Raúl Castro

4 November 2017 Round 15	Marathón	1 – 0	Honduras Progreso	San Pedro Sula, Cortés
15:00	Romero 88'	Report		Stadium: Estadio Yankel Rosenthal; Referee: Erick Andino

19 November 2017 Round 16	Olimpia	0 – 1	Marathón	Tegucigalpa, Francisco Morazán
16:00			Arboleda 86'	Stadium: Estadio Tiburcio Carías Andino; Referee: Nelson Salgado

11 November 2017 Round 17	Marathón	5 – 0	Lobos UPNFM	San Pedro Sula, Cortés
15:00	Romero 6'; Arboleda 53' (pen.) 66' (pen.); Berríos 60'; Lahera 63'	Report		Stadium: Estadio Yankel Rosenthal; Referee: Orlando Hernández

23 November 2017 Round 18	Real Sociedad	2 – 0	C.D. Marathón	Tocoa, Colón
19:00	Welcome 9'; Reyes 50'	Report		Stadium: Estadio Francisco Martínez; Referee: Armando Castro

==== Semifinals ====
13 December 2017 1st leg	Real España	3 – 0	Marathón	San Pedro Sula, Cortés
19:30 (UTC−06)	Delgado 43'; Oseguera 69'; Benavidez 72'	Report		Stadium: Estadio Francisco Morazán

23 December 2017 2nd leg	Marathón	3 – 1	Real España	San Pedro Sula, Cortés
15:00 (UTC−06)	Lacayo 52'; Arboleda 55' (pen.) 62' (pen.)	Report	Martínez 10'	Stadium: Estadio Olímpico Metropolitano; Referee: Saíd Martínez

- Real España won 4–3 on aggregate.

== Clausura ==
=== Squad ===
Note: Flags indicate national team as defined under FIFA eligibility rules; some limited exceptions apply. Players may hold more than one non-FIFA nationality.

No.	Pos.	Nation	Player
1	GK	HON	John Bodden
–	GK	HON	Denovan Torres
2	DF	HON	Bryan Barrios
12	DF	HON	Carlos Perdomo
29	DF	HON	Bryan Johnson
23	DF	HON	Johnny Leverón
21	DF	HON	Daniel Tejeda
3	DF	HON	Samuel Córdova
15	DF	HON	Kevin Espinoza
16	MF	HON	Allan Banegas
17	MF	HON	Wilmer Fuentes
38	MF	HON	Bryan Martínez
48	MF	HON	Cristian Cálix
30	MF	HON	Víctor Arauz

No.	Pos.	Nation	Player
10	MF	HON	Joshua Vargas
6	MF	HON	John Paul Suazo
47	MF	HON	Roger Iscoa
7	MF	HON	Juan Josué Rodríguez
28	MF	HON	Carlos Benedith
33	MF	HON	Óscar González
11	MF	HON	Víctor Berríos
20	MF	HON	Erick Arias
27	FW	COL	Justin Arboleda
24	FW	CUB	Yaudel Lahera
8	FW	HON	Júnior Lacayo
14	FW	HON	Darvis Argueta
22	FW	HON	Henry Romero
58	FW	HON	Bryan Castillo

=== Standings ===
Pos	Team	Pld	W	D	L	GF	GA	GD	Pts	Qualification or relegation
1	Marathón	18	11	4	3	35	23	+12	37	Qualification to the Semifinals
2	Motagua	18	10	4	4	29	17	+12	34	Qualification to the Semifinals
3	Olimpia	18	9	6	3	34	19	+15	33	Qualification to the Second round
4	Real España	18	7	7	4	22	19	+3	28	Qualification to the Second round
5	Honduras Progreso	18	8	2	8	22	30	−8	26	Qualification to the Second round

Updated to match(es) played on 15 April 2018. Source:

=== Matches ===
==== Results by round ====
Round	1	2	3	4	5	6	7	8	9	10	11	12	13	14	15	16	17	18
Ground	A	H	A	H	H	A	A	H	A	H	A	H	A	A	H	H	A	H
Result	W	W	D	W	D	L	L	D	W	W	W	W	L	D	W	W	W	W

Updated to match(es) played on 20 April 2018. Source:
A = Away; H = Home; W = Win; D = Draw; L = Loss

==== Regular season ====
21 January 2018 Round 1	Platense	2 – 4	Marathón	Puerto Cortés, Cortés
15:00	Aguilar 10'; Hay 65' (pen.)	Report	Lacayo 43'; Martínez 45+1'; Romero 60'; Suazo 83'	Stadium: Estadio Excélsior; Referee: Héctor Rodríguez

24 January 2018 Round 2	Marathón	3 – 2	Lobos UPNFM	San Pedro Sula, Cortés
19:00	Romero 7' 81'; Rodríguez 23'	Report	Róchez 51' 89'	Stadium: Estadio Francisco Morazán; Referee: Erick Andino

28 January 2018 Round 3	Olimpia	1 – 1	Marathón	Comayagua, Comayagua
16:00	Chirinos 48'	Report	Lacayo 8'	Stadium: Estadio Carlos Miranda; Referee: Manuel Zelaya

21 February 2018 Round 4	Marathón	2 – 1	Juticalpa	San Pedro Sula, Cortés
15:00	Jhonson 36'; Arboleda 46'	Report	Lanza 41'	Stadium: Estadio Yankel Rosenthal; Referee: Melvin Matamoros

3 February 2018 Round 5	Marathón	1 – 1	Real España	San Pedro Sula, Cortés
15:00	Martínez 1'	Report	Vargas 90+5'	Stadium: Estadio Yankel Rosenthal; Referee: Óscar Moncada

7 February 2018 Round 6	Real Sociedad	1 – 0	Marathón	Tocoa, Colón
15:00	Britto 1'	Report		Stadium: Estadio Francisco Martínez; Referee: Marlon Díaz

11 February 2018 Round 7	Motagua	3 – 0	Marathón	Tegucigalpa, Francisco Morazán
16:00	Martínez 20'; Castillo 36' 73' (pen.)	Report		Stadium: Estadio Tiburcio Carías Andino; Referee: Erick Andino

14 February 2018 Round 8	Marathón	2 – 2	Vida	San Pedro Sula, Cortés
15:00	Arboleda 47'; Lacayo 61'	Report	Charles 32'; Onofre 90+3'	Stadium: Estadio Yankel Rosenthal; Referee: Orlando Hernández

18 February 2018 Round 9	Honduras Progreso	2 – 5	Marathón	El Progreso, Yoro
18:00	Arboleda 16' (o.g.); Mencía 37'	Report	Lacayo 18' 77'; Arboleda 45+1'; Suazo 73'; Cálix 90+1'	Stadium: Estadio Humberto Micheletti

25 February 2018 Round 10	Marathón	3 – 0	Platense	San Pedro Sula, Cortés
15:00	Banegas 35'; Suazo 45+1'; Arboleda 76' (pen.)	Report		Stadium: Estadio Yankel Rosenthal; Referee: Héctor Rodríguez

5 March 2018 Round 11	Lobos UPNFM	1 – 2	Marathón	Tegucigalpa, Francisco Morazán
15:00	Padilla 67'	Report	Rodríguez 56'; Arboleda 85' (pen.)	Stadium: Estadio Tiburcio Carías Andino; Referee: Melvin Matamoros

11 March 2018 Round 12	Marathón	3 – 1	Olimpia	San Pedro Sula, Cortés
15:00	Leverón 66' (pen.); Lahera 77' 84'	Report	Chirinos 47'	Stadium: Estadio Yankel Rosenthal; Attendance: 3,515; Referee: Nelson Salgado

17 March 2018 Round 13	Juticalpa	2 – 0	Marathón	Juticalpa, Olancho
18:00	Lanza 33' (pen.); Ramírez 70'	Report		Stadium: Estadio Juan Ramón Brevé; Referee: David Cruz

24 March 2018 Round 14	Real España	1 – 1	Marathón	San Pedro Sula, Cortés
19:00	Benadivez 11'	Report	Suazo 6'	Stadium: Estadio Francisco Morazán; Referee: Héctor Rodríguez

24 March 2018 Round 15	Marathón	3 – 1	Real Sociedad	San Pedro Sula, Cortés
19:00	Leverón 48'; Lacayo 56'; Arboleda 65'	Report	Melgares 45+2' (pen.)	Stadium: Estadio Yankel Rosenthal; Referee: Óscar Moncada

6 April 2018 Round 16	Marathón	2 – 1	Motagua	San Pedro Sula, Cortés
15:00	Arboleda 70' (pen.) 80'	Report	Castillo 21'	Stadium: Estadio Yankel Rosenthal; Referee: Héctor Rodríguez

11 April 2018 Round 17	Vida	0 – 1	Marathón	La Ceiba, Atlántida
19:15		Report	Arboleda 64'	Stadium: Estadio Nilmo Edwards; Referee: Raúl Castro

15 April 2018 Round 18	Marathón	2 – 1	Honduras Progreso	San Pedro Sula, Cortés
15:00	Rodríguez 29'; Arboleda 36' (pen.)	Report	Mencía 19'	Stadium: Estadio Yankel Rosenthal; Referee: Erick Andino

==== Semifinals ====
28 April 2018 1st leg	Real España	0 – 1	Marathón	San Pedro Sula, Cortés
19:00 (UTC−06)		Report	Arboleda 50'	Stadium: Estadio Francisco Morazán; Referee: Melvin Matamoros

5 May 2018 2nd leg	Marathón	2 – 1	Real España	San Pedro Sula, Cortés
15:00 (UTC−06)	Leverón 4' (pen.); Lahera 50'	Report	Martínez 89' (pen.)	Stadium: Estadio Yankel Rosenthal; Attendance: 5,545; Referee: Héctor Rodríguez

- Marathón won 3–1 on aggregate.

==== Final ====
13 May 2018 1st leg	Motagua	1 – 1	Marathón	Tegucigalpa, Francisco Morazán
16:00 (UTC−06)	Discua 27'	Report	Martínez 41'	Stadium: Estadio Tiburcio Carías Andino; Referee: Melvin Matamoros

19 May 2018 2nd leg	Marathón	0 – 0 (a.e.t.) (5–4 p)	Motagua	San Pedro Sula, Cortés
14:00 (UTC−06)		Report		Stadium: Estadio Yankel Rosenthal; Attendance: 9,200; Referee: Óscar Moncada
	Penalties
	Leverón (penalty missed); Banegas (penalty scored); Vargas (penalty scored); Suazo (penalty scored); Rodríguez (penalty scored); Johnson (penalty scored)		(penalty scored) Crisanto; (penalty scored) Montes; (penalty scored) Martínez; (penalty missed) Pereira; (penalty scored) Elvir; (penalty missed) Mayorquín

== Top scorers ==
Player	Goals
(Colombia) Justin Arboleda	24
(Honduras) Júnior Lacayo	10
(Cuba) Yaudel Lahera	6
(Honduras) Henry Romero	4
(Honduras) John Paul Suazo	4
(Honduras) Juan Josué Rodríguez	4
(Honduras) Johnny Leverón	4
(Honduras) Cristian Cálix	3
(Honduras) Allan Banegas	2
(Honduras) Mario Berríos*	1
(Honduras) Bryan Jhonson	1
(Honduras) Joshua Vargas	1
