= 2018–19 C.D. Marathón season =

Marathón
2018–19 season
- Chairman: Orinson Amaya
- Manager: Héctor Vargas
- Stadium: Estadio Yankel Rosenthal
- Apertura: 4th - Playoffs
- Clausura: 2nd - Semifinals
- Cup: Round of 16
- Supercup: Winners
- CONCACAF Champions League: Round of 16
- Top goalscorer: League: Justin Arboleda (20); All: Justin Arboleda (23)
Home colours
- All statistics correct as of 4 March 2019.

The 2018–19 season was C.D. Marathón's 68th season in existence and the club's 53rd consecutive season in the top fight of Honduran football. The club fought for its 10th league title, in which they failed on both Apertura and Clausura tournaments.

Facing also the 2018 Honduran Cup and the 2019 Honduran Supercup, the club went on to win the last one, the first Supercup in their history.

== Overview ==
Héctor Vargas renewed his contract on April 23, during the 2017–18 Clausura tournament.

== Apertura ==
=== Transfers in ===
| Player | Contract date | Moving from | Position |
|---|---|---|---|
| (Honduras) Carlos Róchez | 29 May 2018 | (Honduras) Lobos UPNFM | MF |
| (Costa Rica) Roy Smith | 2 June 2018 | Honduras Progreso | DF |
| (Honduras) Marlon Ramírez | 23 June 2018 | (Egypt) ENPPI SC | FW |
| (Honduras) Carlos Discua | 27 June 2018 | (Honduras) Motagua | MF |
| (Honduras) Jorge Armando Cardona | 21 July 2018 | Honduras Progreso | MF |

=== Transfers out ===
| Player | Released date | Moving to | Position |
|---|---|---|---|
| (Honduras) John Paul Suazo | 20 May 2018 | (Honduras) Olimpia | DF/MF |
| (Honduras) Júnior Lacayo | 20 May 2018 | (Honduras) Olimpia | FW |
| (Honduras) Daniel Tejeda | 30 May 2018 | TBA | DF |
| (Honduras) Wilmer Fuentes | 30 May 2018 | Honduras Progreso | MF |
| (Honduras) Johnny Leverón | 5 June 2018 | (Honduras) Real C.D. España | DF |

=== Standings ===
| Pos | Team | Pld | W | D | L | GF | GA | GD | Pts | Qualification or relegation |
|---|---|---|---|---|---|---|---|---|---|---|
| 2 | Olimpia | 18 | 8 | 8 | 2 | 25 | 17 | +8 | 32 | Advance to Playoffs (Semifinals) |
| 3 | UPNFM | 18 | 9 | 3 | 6 | 25 | 20 | +5 | 30 | Advance to Playoffs (Quarterfinals) |
| 4 | Marathón | 18 | 7 | 7 | 4 | 28 | 22 | +6 | 28 | Advance to Playoffs (Quarterfinals) |
| 5 | Real España | 18 | 7 | 5 | 6 | 31 | 25 | +6 | 26 | Advance to Playoffs (Quarterfinals) |
| 6 | Platense | 18 | 6 | 6 | 6 | 21 | 18 | +3 | 24 | Advance to Playoffs (Quarterfinals) |

Source: Soccerway
Rules for classification: 1) points; 2) goal difference; 3) number of goals scored.

=== Matches ===
==== Results by round ====
| Round | 1 | 2 | 3 | 4 | 5 | 6 | 7 | 8 | 9 | 10 | 11 | 12 | 13 | 14 | 15 | 16 | 17 | 18 |
|---|---|---|---|---|---|---|---|---|---|---|---|---|---|---|---|---|---|---|
| Ground | H | A | H | A | A | H | H | A | H | A | H | A | H | H | A | A | H | A |
| Result | D | D | D | W | D | W | D | L | W | W | W | L | W | D | L | L | D | W |

A = Away; H = Home; W = Win; D = Draw; L = Loss

==== Regular season ====
| 28 July 2018 Round 1 | Marathón | 0 – 0 | Vida | San Pedro Sula, Cortés |
| 15:00 | | Report | | Stadium: Estadio Yankel Rosenthal; Referee: David Mendoza |

| 4 August 2018 Round 2 | Lobos UPNFM | 1 – 1 | Marathón | Choluteca, Choluteca |
| 18:00 | Benguché 16' | Report | Córdova 18' | Stadium: Estadio Emilio Williams Agasse; Referee: Said Martínez |

| 11 August 2018 Round 3 | Marathón | 1 – 1 | Olimpia | San Pedro Sula, Cortés |
| 15:00 | Romero 27' | Report | Martínez 56' | Stadium: Estadio Yankel Rosenthal; Referee: Erick Andino |

| 15 August 2018 Round 4 | Juticalpa | 0 – 3 Awarded | Marathón | Juticalpa, Olancho |
| 19:00 | Cabezas 70' | Report | Discua 83' | Stadium: Estadio Juan Ramón Brevé Vargas; Referee: Óscar Moncada |
Note: Match awarded to C.D. Marathón with a 3–0 score as a result of Juticalpa F.C. fielding the ineligible player Carlos Palacios. The match originally ended 1–1.

| 18 August 2018 Round 5 | Real España | 1 – 1 | Marathón | San Pedro Sula, Cortés |
| 19:00 | Benavidez 90+4' | Report | Arboleda 32' (pen.) | Stadium: Estadio Francisco Morazán; Referee: Héctor Rodríguez |

| 29 August 2018 Round 6 | Marathón | 3 – 1 | Real de Minas | San Pedro Sula, Cortés |
| 15:00 | Córdova 6'; Arboleda 36'; Lahera 67' | Report | Padilla 8' | Stadium: Estadio Yankel Rosenthal; Referee: Melvin Matamoros |

| 10 October 2018 Round 7 | Marathón | 1 – 1 | Motagua | San Pedro Sula, Cortés |
| 15:00 | Arboleda 19' | Report | López 37' | Stadium: Estadio Yankel Rosenthal; Referee: Nelson Salgado |

| 9 September 2018 Round 8 | Platense | 1 – 0 | Marathón | Puerto Cortés, Cortés |
| 16:00 | Arriaga 11' | Report | | Stadium: Estadio Excélsior; Referee: David Cruz |

| 12 September 2018 Round 9 | Marathón | 3 – 1 | Honduras Progreso | San Pedro Sula, Cortés |
| 15:00 | Discua 16'; González 21' (o.g.); Lahera 74' | Report | Delgado 83' | Stadium: Estadio Yankel Rosenthal; Referee: Melvin Matamoros |

| 16 September 2018 Round 10 | Vida | 0 – 1 | Marathón | La Ceiba, Atlántida |
| 15:00 | | Report | Discua 75' | Stadium: Estadio Nilmo Edwards; Referee: Marlon Díaz |

| 20 September 2018 Round 11 | Marathón | 2 – 1 | Lobos UPNFM | San Pedro Sula, Cortés |
| 15:00 | Lahera 20'; Ramírez 90+1' | Report | Cálix 66' | Stadium: Estadio Yankel Rosenthal; Referee: Marlon Díaz |

| 30 September 2018 Round 12 | Olimpia | 2 – 1 | Marathón | Tegucigalpa, Francisco Morazán |
| 16:00 | Bengtson 2', 28' | Report | Discua 83' (pen.) | Stadium: Estadio Tiburcio Carías Andino; Referee: Óscar Moncada |

| 6 October 2018 Round 13 | Marathón | 4 – 3 | Juticalpa | San Pedro Sula, Cortés |
| 15:00 | Róchez 22'; Arboleda 37'; Lahera 45+3'; Barahona 51' (o.g.) | Report | Güity 45+1'; Cabezas 53'; Moncada 76' | Stadium: Estadio Yankel Rosenthal |

| 14 October 2018 Round 14 | Marathón | 2 – 2 | Real España | San Pedro Sula, Cortés |
| 15:00 | Arboleda 59' (pen.); Lahera 90+5' | Report | Benavidez 39'; López 70' | Stadium: Estadio Yankel Rosenthal; Referee: Melvin Matamoros |

| 22 October 2018 Round 15 | Real de Minas | 3 – 1 | Marathón | Siguatepeque, Comayagua |
| 15:00 | Flores 8'; Martínez 22'; Julián Galo 80' | Report | Lahera 2' | Stadium: Estadio Roberto Martínez Ávila; Referee: Saíd Martínez |

| 29 October 2018 Round 16 | Motagua | 1 – 0 | Marathón | Tegucigalpa, Francisco Morazán |
| 15:00 | Estupiñán 57' | Report | | Stadium: Estadio Tiburcio Carías Andino; Referee: Óscar Moncada |

| 3 November 2018 Round 17 | Marathón | 1 – 1 | Platense | San Pedro Sula, Cortés |
| 15:00 | Romero 84' | Report | Winchester 17' (pen.) | Stadium: Estadio Yankel Rosenthal; Referee: Jonfy Vallecillo |

| 11 November 2018 Round 18 | Honduras Progreso | 2 – 3 | Marathón | El Progreso, Yoro |
| 19:00 | Tobías 55'; Gutiérrez 67' | Report | Arboleda 35', 52', 85' | Stadium: Estadio Humberto Micheletti; Referee: Raúl Castro |

==== Playoffs ====
| 14 November 2018 1st leg | Real España | 2 – 0 | Marathón | San Pedro Sula, Cortés |
| 19:00 (UTC−06) | Benavidez 34' (pen.); Vuelto 78' (pen.) | Report | | Stadium: Estadio Francisco Morazán; Referee: Nelson Salgado |

| 17 November 2018 2nd leg | Marathón | 3 – 2 | Real España | San Pedro Sula, Cortés |
| 15:00 (UTC−06) | Arboleda 3', 36'; Discua 65' | Report | Tejeda 39'; Oseguera 52' | Stadium: Estadio Yankel Rosenthal; Referee: Melvin Matamoros |

- Real España won 4–3 on aggregate.

== Clausura ==
=== Transfers in ===
| Player | Contract date | Moving from | Position |
|---|---|---|---|
| (Honduras) Mayron Flores | 31 December 2018 | (Honduras) Olimpia | MF |
| (Brazil) Caue Fernandes | 5 January 2018 | Free agent | DF |
| (Honduras) Carlo Costly | 17 January 2018 | (Honduras) Olimpia | FW |

=== Transfers out ===
| Player | Released date | Moving to | Position |
|---|---|---|---|
| (Costa Rica) Roy Smith | 25 December 2018 | TBA | DF |
| (Honduras) Cristian Cálix | 27 December 2018 | (Mexico) Atlas | MF |
| (Honduras) Wilmer Fuentes | 1 January 2019 | (Honduras) Platense | MF |

=== Standings ===
| Pos | Team | Pld | W | D | L | GF | GA | GD | Pts | Qualification or relegation |
|---|---|---|---|---|---|---|---|---|---|---|
| 1 | Olimpia | 18 | 11 | 4 | 3 | 31 | 13 | +18 | 37 | Advance to Playoffs (Semifinals) |
| 2 | Marathón | 18 | 10 | 4 | 4 | 32 | 24 | +8 | 34 | Advance to Playoffs (Semifinals) |
| 3 | Motagua | 18 | 9 | 4 | 5 | 29 | 15 | +14 | 31 | Advance to Playoffs (Quarterfinals) |
| 4 | Real España | 18 | 7 | 7 | 4 | 19 | 15 | +4 | 28 | Advance to Playoffs (Quarterfinals) |
| 5 | UPNFM | 18 | 6 | 9 | 3 | 22 | 16 | +6 | 27 | Advance to Playoffs (Quarterfinals) |

Source: Soccerway
Rules for classification: 1) points; 2) goal difference; 3) number of goals scored.

=== Matches ===
==== Results by round ====
| Round | 1 | 2 | 3 | 4 | 5 | 6 | 7 | 8 | 9 | 10 | 11 | 12 | 13 | 14 | 15 | 16 | 17 | 18 |
|---|---|---|---|---|---|---|---|---|---|---|---|---|---|---|---|---|---|---|
| Ground | H | A | H | A | A | H | H | A | H | A | H | A | H | H | A | A | H | A |
| Result | W | W | W | D | D | W | W | W | W | D | W | L | L | D | L | L | W | W |

A = Away; H = Home; W = Win; D = Draw; L = Loss

==== Regular season ====
| 12 January 2019 Round 1 | Marathón | 3 – 1 | Lobos UPNFM | San Pedro Sula, Cortés |
| 15:00 | Arboleda 23', 38'; Jhonson 67' | Report | Meléndez 89' (pen.) | Stadium: Estadio Yankel Rosenthal |

| 20 January 2019 Round 2 | Platense | 2 – 3 | Marathón | Puerto Cortés, Cortés |
| 16:00 | Winchester 13'; Bolaños 25' | Report | Martínez 11'; Solano 38'; Jhonson 86' (pen.) | Stadium: Estadio Excelsior |

| 26 January 2019 Round 3 | Marathón | 1 – 0 | Olimpia | San Pedro Sula, Cortés |
| 15:00 | Arboleda 87' | Report | | Stadium: Estadio Yankel Rosenthal; Attendance: 6,000; Referee: Melvin Matamoros |

| 3 February 2019 Round 4 | Juticalpa | 1 – 1 | Marathón | Juticalpa, Olancho |
| 14:00 | Lanza 81' | Report | Barrios 12' | Stadium: Estadio Juan Ramón Brevé; Referee: Saíd Martínez |

| 3 February 2019 Round 5 | Real España | 1 – 1 | Marathón | San Pedro Sula, Cortés |
| 19:00 | Tobías 60' | Report | Costly 32' | Stadium: Estadio Francisco Morazán; Referee: Raúl Castro |

| 13 February 2019 Round 6 | Marathón | 4 – 3 | Vida | San Pedro Sula, Cortés |
| 15:00 | Lahera 6'; Arboleda 38'; Discua 40'; Solano 70' | Report | Padilla 20'; Canales 36'; Hernández 57' | Stadium: Estadio Yankel Rosenthal |

| 16 February 2019 Round 7 | Marathón | 1 – 0 | Motagua | San Pedro Sula, Cortés |
| 15:00 | Discua 47' | Report | | Stadium: Estadio Yankel Rosenthal; Attendance: 3,000; Referee: Óscar Moncada |

| 23 February 2019 Round 8 | Honduras Progreso | 0 – 1 | Marathón | El Progreso, Yoro |
| 19:15 | | Report | Costly 20' (pen.) | Stadium: Estadio Humberto Micheletti; Referee: David Cruz |

| 3 March 2019 Round 9 | Marathón | 2 – 1 | Real de Minas | San Pedro Sula, Cortés |
| 15:00 | Arboleda 32' (pen.); Jhonson 45+3' | Report | Andino 74' | Stadium: Estadio Yankel Rosenthal |

| 6 March 2019 Round 10 | Lobos UPNFM | 0 – 0 | Marathón | Choluteca, Choluteca |
| 18:00 | | Report | | Stadium: Estadio Emilio Williams Agasse; Referee: Raúl Castro |

| 10 March 2019 Round 11 | Marathón | 2 – 1 | Platense | San Pedro Sula, Cortés |
| 15:00 | Jhonson 56'; Lahera 63' | Report | Nieto 45+2' (pen.) | Stadium: Estadio Yankel Rosenthal; Referee: Melvin Matamoros |

| 14 March 2019 Round 12 | Olimpia | 3 – 0 | Marathón | Tegucigalpa, Cortés |
| 19:00 | Bengtson 16', 23', 26' | Report | | Stadium: Estadio Tiburcio Carías Andino; Referee: Raúl Castro |

| 30 March 2019 Round 13 | Marathón | 1 – 2 | Juticalpa | San Pedro Sula, Cortés |
| 15:00 | Arboleda 66' (pen.) | Report | Techera 16'; Estupiñán 84' | Stadium: Estadio Yankel Rosenthal; Referee: Óscar Moncada |

| 6 April 2019 Round 14 | Marathón | 2 – 2 | Real España | San Pedro Sula, Cortés |
| 15:30 | Costly 3', 61' | Report | Vuelto 34'; Tejeda 86' | Stadium: Estadio Yankel Rosenthal; Referee: Héctor Rodríguez |

| 10 April 2019 Round 15 | Vida | 2 – 1 | Marathón | La Ceiba, Atlántida |
| 19:15 | Canales 44' (pen.), 77' | Report | Discua 84' (pen.) | Stadium: Estadio Nilmo Edwards; Referee: Nelson Salgado |

| 14 April 2019 Round 16 | Motagua | 5 – 1 | Marathón | Tegucigalpa, Cortés |
| 16:00 | López 8'; Estigarribia 37', 50'; Andino 58'; Crisanto 85' (pen.) | Report | Arboleda 21' | Stadium: Estadio Tiburcio Carías Andino; Referee: Erick Andino |

| 17 April 2019 Round 17 | Marathón | 6 – 0 | Honduras Progreso | San Pedro Sula, Cortés |
| 15:30 | Discua 34'; Fernandes 39'; Ramírez 57' (pen.); Solani 78'; Romero 80'; Miranda 88' | Report | | Stadium: Estadio Yankel Rosenthal; Referee: Saíd Martínez |

| 27 April 2019 Round 18 | Real de Minas | 0 – 2 | Marathón | Danlí, El Paraíso |
| 15:00 | | Report | Jhonson 43'; Arboleda 70' | Stadium: Estadio Marcelo Tinoco |

==== Semifinals ====
| 12 May 2019 1st leg | Motagua | 2 – 0 | Marathón | Tegucigalpa, Francisco Morazán |
| 16:00 (UTC−06) | Galvaliz 9'; López 64' | Report | | Stadium: Estadio Tiburcio Carías Andino; Referee: Said Martínez |

| 18 May 2019 2nd leg | Marathón | 2 – 2 | Motagua | San Pedro Sula, Cortés |
| 15:00 (UTC−06) | Arboleda 37', 42' | Report | Estigarribia 47'; Montes 73' | Stadium: Estadio Yankel Rosenthal; Attendance: 5,450; Referee: Óscar Moncada |

- Motagua won 4–2 on aggregate.

== President Cup ==
=== Round of 64 ===
| 22 July 2018 Round of 64 | La Virtud | 1 – 11 | Marathón | Gracias, Lempira |
| 14:00 | ¿? | Report | Lahera; Arboleda; Johnson; Ramírez; Romero; Argueta ¿? | Stadium: Estadio Marco Augusto Hernández; Referee: Raúl Castro |

=== Round of 32 ===
| 22 August 2018 Round of 32 | Brasilia | 0–1 | Marathón | Río Lindo, Cortés |
| 18:00 | | | 89' Arboleda | Stadium: Estadio Filiberto Fernández |

=== Round of 16 ===
| 5 September 2018 Round of 16 | Real España | 3–0 | Marathón | San Pedro Sula, Cortés |
| 19:00 | | Report | | Stadium: Estadio Francisco Morazán; Referee: Orlando Hernández |
Note: Match awarded to Real España with a 3–0 score after Marathón abandoned the field at '88 (0–0) for not accepting a penalty called by the referee.

== Honduran Supercup ==
| 24 April 2019 | Platense | 0–0 (2–4 p) | Marathón | Comayagua, Comayagua |
| 18:00 | | | | Stadium: Estadio Carlos Miranda; Referee: Jonfy Vallecillo |
| | Penalties |
| | Nieto (penalty missed); Reyes (penalty missed); Aguilar (penalty scored); Winshester (penalty scored) | | (penalty scored) Costly; (penalty scored) Banegas; (penalty scored) Discua; (penalty missed) Vargas; (penalty scored) Arboleda |

== CONCACAF Champions League ==
=== Round of 16 ===
| 20 February 2019 First leg | Marathón (Honduras) | 2–6 | (Mexico) Santos Laguna | San Pedro Sula, Honduras |
| 19:00 | Banegas (yellow card) 43'; Solani (yellow card) 45+1'; Ramírez 50'; Arboleda (yellow card) 73' (goal) 74' | Report | (yellow card) 14' Abella; 20', 32', 38' Correa; 49' Dória; 61' Moreno; 68' Furch; (yellow card) 84' Rivas | Stadium: Estadio Olímpico Metropolitano; Referee: (Cuba) Yadel Martínez |

| 27 February 2019 Second leg | Santos Laguna (Mexico) | 5–0 (11–2 agg.) | (Honduras) Marathón | Torreón, Mexico |
| 19:00 | Moreno 19'; Furch 22'; Rivas 31'; Aguirre 82'; de Buen 85' (pen.) | Report | (yellow card) 25' B. Martínez; (yellow card) 30' Córdova; (yellow card) 65' Bernárdez; (yellow card) 68' Banegas | Stadium: Corona; Referee: (Canada) Drew Fischer |

Santos Laguna won 11–2 on aggregate.
