= 2017–18 Honduran Liga Nacional =

Liga Nacional
- Season: 2017–18
- Dates: 29 July 2017–May 2018
- Champions: Apertura: Real España; Clausura: Marathón
- Relegated: Real Sociedad
- CONCACAF Champions League: Marathón
- CONCACAF League: Real España; Motagua
- Matches: 200
- Goals: 545 (2.73 per match)
- Top goalscorer: Arboleda (24)
- Biggest home win: OLI 6–1 HNP
- Biggest away win: HNP 2–5 MAR
- Highest scoring: VID 5–3 HNP; JUT 3–5 OLI
- Longest unbeaten run: Motagua (12)
- Longest losing run: Platense (5); Real España (5); Juticalpa (5)
- All statistics correct as of 19 May 2018.

The 2017–18 Honduran Liga Nacional season was the 52nd Honduran Liga Nacional edition since its establishment in 1965. For this season, the system format remained the same as the previous season. The tournament started on 28 July 2017 and ended on 19 May 2018. The season was divided into two halves (Apertura and Clausura), each crowning one champion. C.D. Marathón, as the team with the best record, qualified to the 2019 CONCACAF Champions League. Real C.D. España and F.C. Motagua qualified to the 2018 CONCACAF League.

== 2017–18 teams ==
Location of teams in 2017–18 season

A total of 10 teams contested the tournament, including 9 sides from the 2016–17 season plus Lobos UPNFM, promoted from the 2016–17 Liga de Ascenso.

Team	Location	Stadium	Capacity
Honduras Progreso	El Progreso	Estadio Humberto Micheletti	5,000
Juticalpa	Juticalpa	Estadio Juan Ramón Brevé Vargas	20,000
Marathón	San Pedro Sula	Estadio Yankel Rosenthal	15,000
Motagua	Tegucigalpa	Estadio Tiburcio Carías Andino	35,000
Olimpia	Tegucigalpa	Estadio Tiburcio Carías Andino	35,000
Platense	Puerto Cortés	Estadio Excélsior	7,910
Real España	San Pedro Sula	Estadio Francisco Morazán	26,781
Real Sociedad	Tocoa	Estadio Francisco Martínez Durón	3,000
UPNFM	Tegucigalpa	Estadio Tiburcio Carías Andino	35,000
Vida	La Ceiba	Estadio Nilmo Edwards	18,000

- Motagua changed its name from Club Deportivo Motagua to Fútbol Club Motagua.
- F.C. Motagua used Comayagua and Choluteca as alternate venues in some games.
- Lobos UPNFM used Comayagua and Choluteca as alternate venues in some games.

== Managerial changes ==
Team	Outgoing manager	Manner of departure	Vacancy	Replaced by	Appointment	Position in table
Juticalpa	(Honduras) José Durón	Sacked	18 May 2017	(Honduras) Mauro Reyes	18 May 2017	Preseason
Marathón	(Uruguay) Manuel Keosseián	Resigned	6 June 2017	(Argentina) Héctor Vargas	6 June 2017	Preseason
Vida	(Honduras) Santiago Fúnez	Sacked	7 June 2017	(Honduras) Héctor Castellón	6 June 2017	Preseason
Real Sociedad	(Honduras) Héctor Medina	Sacked	26 June 2017	(Honduras) Carlos Martínez	26 June 2017	Preseason
Honduras Progreso	(Honduras) Wilmer Cruz	Resigned	5 September 2017	(Honduras) Nerlin Membreño	5 September 2017	9th
Platense	(Honduras) Reynaldo Clavasquín	Sacked	20 September 2017	(Honduras) Jorge Lozano	21 September 2017	10th
Real Sociedad	(Honduras) Carlos Martínez	Resigned	1 October 2017	(Honduras) Douglas Munguía	4 October 2017	9th
Real España	(Honduras) Ramón Maradiaga	Resigned	23 October 2017	(Honduras) Erick Gallegos	24 October 2017	5th
Real España	(Honduras) Erick Gallegos	Replaced	7 November 2017	(Uruguay) Martín García	7 November 2017	7th
Honduras Progreso	(Honduras) Nerlin Membreño	Sacked	12 December 2017	(Colombia) Horacio Londoño	27 December 2017	Mid-season
Platense	(Colombia) Jairo Ríos	Sacked	28 January 2018	(Honduras) Carlos Martínez	28 January 2018	10th
Juticalpa	(Honduras) Mauro Reyes	Sacked	15 February 2018	(Honduras) Ramón Maradiaga	15 February 2018	10th
Olimpia	(Colombia) Carlos Restrepo	Sacked	20 March 2018	(Honduras) Nahúm Espinoza	20 March 2018	3rd

== Apertura ==
The Apertura tournament was the first half of the 2017–18 season which ran from July to December 2017. The first game of the season was played on 29 July between Club Deportivo Olimpia and new newcomers Lobos UPNFM which ended in a 1–0 victory for the home club. This game in fact corresponds to week 4, however, Olimpia requested a reschedule as they faced Liga Deportiva Alajuelense on that same week for the 2017 CONCACAF League. On 18 August, la entire week 3 was cancelled due to a referee's strike, who requested for a salary increase which was rejected. On 2 September, C.D. Honduras Progreso played against Lobos UPNFM at Estadio Humberto Micheletti, a game which was witnessed only by 56 spectators, one more over the current record implemented by Palestino F.C. v Pumas UNAH (55 in 1998). On 24 September, F.C. Motagua paid a visit to Platense F.C. at Estadio Excélsior; Motagua came with a long 21-game unbeaten run carried since last season; on the other hand, Platense were at the bottom of the league standings. Motagua scored 3 consecutive goals in the first 60 minutes of play to obtain a comfortable lead; however, in the last 20+ minutes of the match, Platense scored 4 goals to give the Selacios the most unlikely win of the season so far. On 19 November, C.D. Marathón defeated Olimpia 0–1 and clinched the first position in the regular standings for their fifth time in history. Three of the four playoff matches were rescheduled due to the 2017 Honduran political crisis. During the 1st leg of the semifinal between Real C.D. España and C.D. Marathón, referee Armando Castro gave Real España a non-existing penalty. Furious fans from the opposite side invaded the pitch and started throwing rocks to policemen and referees. Police answered with tear gas bombs and the authorities decided to suspend the match. The other semifinal between Olimpia and Motagua was also suspended due to lack of security guarantees. On 14 December, the League informed that without safety measures, they will not scheduled any other games until further notice. On 18 December, due to the pressing situation, the League decided to play the rest of the tournament in closed doors, except for the final series. Real España obtained their 12th national title after beating Motagua in the final with a 3–2 global score.

=== Regular season ===
==== Standings ====
Pos	Team	Pld	W	D	L	GF	GA	GD	Pts	Qualification or relegation
1	Marathón	18	11	1	6	27	21	+6	34	Qualification to the Semifinals
2	Motagua	18	9	6	3	31	21	+10	33	Qualification to the Semifinals
3	Olimpia	18	9	4	5	27	15	+12	31	Qualification to the Second round
4	Real España	18	9	2	7	31	25	+6	29	Qualification to the Second round
5	Juticalpa	18	8	4	6	39	30	+9	28	Qualification to the Second round
6	UPNFM	18	7	3	8	22	28	−6	24	Qualification to the Second round
7	Real Sociedad	18	6	4	8	22	28	−6	22	
8	Vida	18	5	6	7	20	23	−3	21	
9	Platense	18	6	1	11	20	37	−17	19	
10	Honduras Progreso	18	4	1	13	26	37	−11	13	

Updated to match(es) played on 23 November 2017. Source:

==== Results ====
As of 23 November 2017

Home \ Away	HNP	JUT	MAR	MOT	OLI	PLA	RES	RSO	UPN	VID
Honduras Progreso		1–2	4–3	2–3	0–1	5–1	0–2	2–2	1–2	2–1
Juticalpa	3–1		3–0	2–2	2–2	5–1	2–3	1–1	3–1	4–1
Marathón	1–0	3–2		1–2	3–2	1–0	1–0	2–0	5–0	1–0
Motagua	1–0	3–2	1–0		1–1	5–1	2–1	1–1	1–1	0–0
Olimpia	3–0	4–1	0–1	0–0		3–0	3–0	2–1	1–0	0–0
Platense	1–0	1–2	0–3	4–3	1–2		3–1	4–2	2–0	1–0
Real España	3–2	2–1	4–0	3–2	2–0	1–0		2–3	2–3	3–0
Real Sociedad	0–1	0–2	2–0	0–2	2–1	1–0	0–0		1–2	2–1
Lobos UPNFM	3–2	3–1	0–1	0–1	0–2	0–0	2–1	4–2		0–1
Vida	5–3	1–1	1–1	2–1	1–0	3–0	1–1	1–2	1–1	

Source: Soccerway
Legend: Blue = home team win; Yellow = draw; Red = away team win.

=== Postseason ===
==== Results ====
Playoffs
3	Olimpia	2	2	4
6	UPNFM	2	0	2
4	Real España	3	2	5
5	Juticalpa	2	0	2

Semifinals
2	Motagua	0	3	3
3	Olimpia	2	1	3
1	Marathón	0	3	3
4	Real España	3	1	4

Finals
1	Motagua	0	2	2
2	Real España	2	1	3

6 December 2017 Playoffs	UPNFM	2–2	Olimpia	Tegucigalpa
14:00	Flores 35' (pen.); Montoya 83' Starting XI (GK) Pineda – 30; Enamorado – 2 Medina – 4 Fiallos – 7 (substituted off) 77' C. Róchez – 8 J. Róchez – 9 Padilla – 10; Yánez – 13; Flores – 23; (substituted off) 43' Arzú – 25; (substituted off) 69' Valencia – 29; Substitutes; (substituted on) 43' Rodríguez – 22; (substituted on) 69' Meléndez – 11; (substituted on) 77' Montoya – 16; Coach; Názar (HON)	Report	54' Estupiñán; 87' (pen.) López Starting XI; 28 – Escober (GK); 5 – Alvarado; 6 – Castillo; 16 – Rodas (substituted off) 46'; 18 – Estupiñán; 19 – Tobías; 20 – López; 21 – Rojas (substituted off) 64'; 29 – G. Mejía; 30 – Palacios; 33 – Chirinos (substituted off) 75'; Substitutes; 7 – C. Mejía (substituted on) 46'; 10 – Méndez (substituted on) 64'; 13 – Costly (substituted on) 75'; Coach (COL) Restrepo	Stadium: Estadio Tiburcio Carías Andino; Attendance: Closed gates Referee: Melvin Matamoros

9 December 2017 Playoffs	Olimpia	2–0	UPNFM	Tegucigalpa
14:30	Velásquez 30'; Rojas 84' Starting XI (GK) Escober – 28; Alvarado – 5 Castillo – 6 (substituted off) 65' Rodas – 16; (substituted off) 74' Estupiñán – 18; Tobías – 19; Rojas – 21; Velásquez – 23; Mejía – 29; Palacios – 30; (substituted off) 82' Chirinos – 33; Substitutes; (substituted on) 65' Garrido – 8 (substituted on) 74' Costly – 13; (substituted on) 82' Álvarez – 2 Coach; Restrepo (COL)	Report	Starting XI; 30 – Pineda (GK); 2 – Enamorado; 4 – Medina; 9 – J. Róchez; 10 – Padilla; 11 – Meléndez (substituted off) 78'; 13 – Yánez; 14 – Castillo; 15 – Urmeneta (substituted off) 46'; 23 – Flores; 25 – Arzú (substituted off) 68'; Substitutes; 29 – Valencia (substituted on) 46'; 8 – C. Róchez (substituted on) 68'; 16 – Montoya (substituted on) 78'; Coach (HON) Názar	Stadium: Estadio Tiburcio Carías Andino; Attendance: 3,258; Referee: Óscar Moncada

- Olimpia won 4–2 on aggregate.

30 November 2017 Playoffs	Juticalpa	2–3	Real España	Juticalpa
19:00	Colón 23'; Quiroz 60' (o.g.) Starting IX (GK) Mendoza – 1 Cyrus – 2 Colón – 4 (substituted off) 59' Munguía – 5 (substituted off) 76' Güity – 6 Morazán – 8 Tinoco – 9 Lanza – 10; (substituted off) 59' Ramírez – 17; Willians – 30; Matute – 33; Substitutes; (substituted on) 59' Ocampo – 7 (substituted on) 59' Velásquez – 18; (substituted on) 76' Rubí – 20; Coach; Reyes (HON)	Report	6' Martínez; 55' López; 73' Arévalo Starting IX; 1 – Hernández (GK); 10 – Martínez; 15 – Vargas; 17 – Claros (substituted off) 83'; 18 – Vuelto; 19 – López (substituted off) 72'; 20 – Arévalo; 23 – Delgado; 24 – Borjas; 28 – Oseguera; 45 – Quiroz (substituted off) 69'; Substitutes; 35 – Cardozo (substituted on) 69'; 16 – Zalazar (substituted on) 72'; 2 – Montes (substituted on) 83'; Coach (URU) García	Stadium: Estadio Juan Ramón Brevé Vargas; Attendance: 1,632; Referee: Nelson Salgado

7 December 2017 Playoffs	Real España	2–0	Juticalpa	San Pedro Sula
16:00	Zalazar 11'; Vuelto 66' Starting XI (GK) Hernández – 1 Martínez – 10; Vargas – 15; (substituted off) 58' Zalazar – 16; (substituted off) 78' Claros – 17; (substituted off) 70' Vuelto – 18; López – 19; Arévalo – 20; Delgado – 23; Oseguera – 28; Barahona – 44; Substitutes; (substituted on) 58' Benavídez – 38; (substituted on) 70' Tejeda – 13; (substituted on) 78' Chávez – 27; Coach; García (URU)	Report	Starting XI; 1 – Mendoza (GK); 4 – Colón (substituted off) 16'; 6 – Güity; 7 – Ocampo; 8 – Morazán; 9 – Tinoco; 10 – Lanza; 17 – Ramírez; 18 – Velásquez (substituted off) 78'; 26 – Duarte; 33 – Matute (substituted off) 58'; Substitutes; 3 – Murillo (substituted on) 16'; 14 – Oseguera (substituted on) 58'; 30 – Willians (substituted on) 78'; Coach (HON) Reyes	Stadium: Estadio Francisco Morazán; Attendance: 1,316; Referee: Orlando Hernández

- Real España won 5–2 on aggregate.

21 December 2017 Semifinals	Real España	3–0	Marathón	San Pedro Sula
10:00	Delgado 43'; Oseguera 69'; Claros (penalty missed); Benavídez 72' Starting XI (GK) Hernández – 1 Martínez – 10; Vargas – 15; (substituted off) 65' Zalazar – 16; Claros – 17; (substituted off) 84' Vuelto – 18; López – 19; Arévalo – 20; Delgado – 23; Oseguera – 28; Barahona – 44; Substitutes; (substituted on) 65' Benavídez – 38; (substituted on) 84' Cardozo – 35 Coach; García (URU)	Report	Starting XI; 29 – Calderón (GK); 3 – Córdova; 4 – Fernandes; 6 – Suazo; 8 – Lacayo; 16 – Banegas; 19 – Berríos (substituted off) 46'; 23 – Leverón (substituted off) 30'; 24 – Lahera; 27 – Arboleda; 48 – Cálix (substituted off) 59'; Substitutes; 2 – Bernárdez (substituted on) 30'; 38 – Martínez (substituted on) 46'; 10 – Vargas (substituted on) 59'; Coach (ARG) Vargas	Stadium: Estadio Francisco Morazán (1'–71'); Estadio Olímpico Metropolitano (72'–90'); Attendance: 6,931; Referee: Armando Castro (1'–71'); Raúl Castro (72'–90')

23 December 2017 Semifinals	Marathón	3–1	Real España	San Pedro Sula
15:00	Lacayo 53'; Arboleda 56' (pen.) 62' (pen.) Starting XI (GK) Calderón – 29; Bernárdez – 2 Córdova – 3 Fernandes – 4 Suazo – 6 Lacayo – 8 (substituted off) 39' Vargas – 10; Banegas – 16; (substituted off) 51' Berríos – 19; (substituted off) 12' Lahera – 24; Arboleda – 27; Substitutes; (substituted on) 12' Cálix – 48; (substituted on) 39' Rodríguez – 7 (substituted on) 51' Romero – 22; Coach; Vargas (ARG)	Report	10' Martínez Starting XI; 1 – Hernández (GK); 2 – Montes; 10 – Martínez; 15 – Vargas; 16 – Zalazar (substituted off) 46'; 17 – Claros; 18 – Vuelto (substituted off) 77'; 19 – López; 20 – Arévalo (substituted off) 46'; 24 – Borjas; 28 – Oseguera; Substitutes; 13 – Tejeda (substituted on) 46'; 38 – Benavídez (substituted on) 46'; 6 – García (substituted on) 77'; Coach (URU) García	Stadium: Estadio Olímpico Metropolitano; Attendance: Closed gates Referee: Saíd Martínez

- First leg was partially played on 13 December after being suspended at 71' (2–0) due to crowd invading the pitch. Match was resumed on 21 December.
- Real España won 4–3 on aggregate.

20 December 2017 Semifinals	Olimpia	2–0	Motagua	Tegucigalpa
15:00	Estupiñán 79'; López 90+5' (pen.) Starting XI (GK) Escober – 28; (substituted off) 23' Álvarez – 2 (substituted off) 74' Costly – 13; Paz – 17; Tobías – 19; López – 20; (substituted off) 69' Rojas – 21; Velásquez – 23; Mejía – 29; Palacios – 30; Chirinos – 33; Substitutes; (substituted on) 23' Castillo – 6 (substituted on) 69' Mejía – 7 (substituted on) 74' Estupiñán – 18; Coach; Restrepo (COL)	Report	Starting XI; 19 – Rougier (GK); 2 – Montes; 3 – Figueroa; 6 – Mayorquín (substituted off) 46'; 7 – Discua (substituted off) 82'; 11 – Vega; 14 – Hernández (red card); 16 – Castellanos; 18 – W. Crisanto (substituted off) 69'; 24 – Elvir; 27 – F. Crisanto; Substitutes; 23 – Flores (substituted on) 46'; 34 – López (substituted on) 69'; 8 – Martínez (substituted on) 82'; Coach (ARG) Vásquez	Stadium: Estadio Tiburcio Carías Andino; Attendance: Closed gates Referee: Saíd Martínez

23 December 2017 Semifinals	Motagua	3–1	Olimpia	Tegucigalpa
15:00	Vega 48'; Castillo 55' 74' Starting XI (GK) Rougier – 19; Montes – 2 Figueroa – 3 (substituted off) 21' Pereira – 5 Discua – 7 (substituted off) 46' Martínez – 8 Castillo – 9 Vega – 11; Castellanos – 16; (substituted off) 46' W. Crisanto – 18; Elvir – 24; Substitutes; (substituted on) 21' F. Crisanto – 27; (substituted on) 46' López – 34; (substituted on) 46' Mayorquín – 6 Coach; Caballero (HON)	Report	3' Velásquez Starting XI; 28 – Escober (GK); 6 – Castillo; 13 – Costly; 17 – Paz; 19 – Tobías; 20 – López; 21 – Rojas (substituted off) 70'; 23 – Velásquez; 29 – G. Mejía (substituted off) 79'; 30 – Palacios; 33 – Chirinos (substituted off) 56'; Substitutes; 8 – Garrido (substituted on) 56'; 7 – C. Mejía (substituted on) 70'; 18 – Estupiñán (substituted on) 79'; Coach (COL) Restrepo	Stadium: Estadio Tiburcio Carías Andino; Attendance: Closed gates Referee: Melvin Matamoros

- Motagua 3–3 Olimpia on aggregate. Motagua advanced on regular season record.

27 December 2017 Final	Real España	2–0	Motagua	San Pedro Sula
17:30	Vuelto 36' 76' Starting XI (GK) Hernández – 1 (substituted off) 90+1' Montes – 2 (substituted off) 71' Martínez – 10; Vargas – 15; Zalazar – 16; Claros – 17; Vuelto – 18; (substituted off) 87' López – 19; Delgado – 23; Oseguera – 28; Barahona – 44; Substitutes; (substituted on) 71' Benavídez – 38; (substituted on) 87' García – 6 (substituted on) 90+1' Cardozo – 35; Coach; García (URU)	Report	Starting XI; 19 – Rougier (GK); 2 – Montes; 3 – Figueroa; 6 – Mayorquín (substituted off) 64'; 7 – Discua; 9 – Castillo; 16 – Castellanos; 24 – Elvir; 27 – F. Crisanto; 31 – Bernárdez (substituted off) 46'; 34 – López (substituted off) 82'; Substitutes; 11 – Vega (substituted on) 46'; 23 – Flores (substituted on) 64'; 18 – W. Crisanto (substituted on) 82'; Coach (ARG) Vásquez	Stadium: Estadio Olímpico Metropolitano; Attendance: 8,192; Referee: Héctor Rodríguez

30 December 2017 Final	Motagua	2–1 (a.e.t.)	Real España	Tegucigalpa
16:00	Castillo 62' 73' (pen.) Starting XI (GK) Licona – 25; Montes – 2 Figueroa – 3 (substituted off) 46' Mayorquín – 6 Discua – 7 Castillo – 9 (substituted off) 46' Vega – 11; Castellanos – 16; (substituted off) 60' W. Crisanto – 18; Elvir – 24; F. Crisanto – 27; Substitutes; (substituted on) 46' Hernández – 14; (substituted on) 46' Martínez – 8 (substituted on) 60' López – 34; Coach; Vásquez (ARG)	Report	108' Tejeda Starting XI; 1 – Hernández (GK); 2 – Montes; 10 – Martínez (substituted off) 82'; 15 – Vargas; 16 – Zalazar (substituted off) 105+1'; 17 – Claros; 18 – Vuelto (substituted off) 65'; 19 – López; 23 – Delgado; 28 – Oseguera; 44 – Barahona; Substitutes; 13 – Tejeda (substituted on) 65'; 38 – Benavídez (substituted on) 82'; 6 – García (substituted on) 105+1'; Coach (URU) García	Stadium: Estadio Tiburcio Carías Andino; Attendance: 13,052; Referee: Saíd Martínez

- Real España won 3–2 on aggregate.

== Clausura ==
The Clausura tournament was the second half of the 2017–18 season which ran from January to May 2018. The schedule was released on 9 December 2017. On 15 April, F.C. Motagua's winger Wilmer Crisanto scored the 20,000th goal in the history of the league. C.D. Marathón finished first in the regular season standings for their second tournament in a row. Just as the previous tournament; Marathón, Motagua, Club Deportivo Olimpia and Real C.D. España reached the semifinals round. On 5 May, Marathón qualified to their 18th final and their first one since 2014. One day later, Motagua eliminated Olimpia and qualified to their 4th consecutive final. It was the 4th time in the league's history that the final series was played between the contenders of the M's Derby. Marathón obtained their 9th national title and Motagua lost their second final in a row.

=== Regular season ===
==== Standings ====
Pos	Team	Pld	W	D	L	GF	GA	GD	Pts	Qualification or relegation
1	Marathón	18	11	4	3	35	23	+12	37	Qualification to the Semifinals
2	Motagua	18	10	4	4	29	17	+12	34	Qualification to the Semifinals
3	Olimpia	18	9	6	3	34	19	+15	33	Qualification to the Second round
4	Real España	18	7	7	4	22	19	+3	28	Qualification to the Second round
5	Honduras Progreso	18	8	2	8	22	30	−8	26	Qualification to the Second round
6	Platense	18	6	4	8	22	27	−5	22	Qualification to the Second round
7	Vida	18	5	6	7	18	19	−1	21	
8	UPNFM	18	5	3	10	18	27	−9	18	
9	Juticalpa	18	5	2	11	25	32	−7	17	
10	Real Sociedad	18	3	4	11	11	23	−12	13	

Updated to match(es) played on 15 April 2018. Source:

==== Results ====
As of 15 April 2018

Home \ Away	HNP	JUT	MAR	MOT	OLI	PLA	RES	RSO	UPN	VID
Honduras Progreso		4–3	2–5	1–2	3–2	2–1	1–1	1–0	1–0	1–0
Juticalpa	2–1		2–0	0–1	3–5	3–1	1–2	2–1	1–1	1–2
Marathón	2–1	2–1		2–1	3–1	3–0	1–1	3–1	3–2	2–2
Motagua	3–0	3–2	3–0		0–1	1–2	1–2	2–0	2–0	1–0
Olimpia	6–1	1–2	1–1	1–1		0–0	2–2	1–0	4–0	1–1
Platense	0–1	0–0	2–4	3–3	1–2		1–1	2–1	1–0	3–1
Real España	1–0	1–0	1–1	0–0	0–1	4–2		1–0	0–1	1–0
Real Sociedad	0–1	1–0	1–0	2–2	0–2	0–1	2–0		1–1	1–1
Lobos UPNFM	1–0	3–2	1–2	1–2	0–2	0–2	2–2	3–0		2–1
Vida	1–1	3–0	0–1	0–1	1–1	1–0	3–2	0–0	1–0	

Source: Soccerway
Legend: Blue = home team win; Yellow = draw; Red = away team win.

=== Postseason ===
==== Results ====
Playoffs
4	Real España	1	0	1
5	Honduras Progreso	1	0	1
3	Olimpia	0	2	2
6	Platense	0	1	1

Semifinals
1	Marathón	1	2	3
4	Real España	0	1	1
2	Motagua	0	1	1
3	Olimpia	0	1	1

Finals
1	Marathón	1	0	1 (5)
2	Motagua	1	0	1 (4)

19 April 2018 Playoffs	Platense	0–0	Olimpia	Puerto Cortés
19:15	Starting XI (GK) Zúniga – 1 Castro – 2 Bolaños – 3 Palacios – 6 Aguilar – 15; (substituted off) 56' Cardona – 16; (substituted off) 73' Winchester – 24; Mendoza – 25; Flores – 29; (substituted off) 82' Benítez – 30; Arriaga – 33; Substitutes; (substituted on) 56' Hay – 77; (substituted on) 73' Nieto – 8 (substituted on) 82' Vargas – Coach; Martínez (HON)	Report	Starting XI; 28 – Escober (GK); 2 – Álvarez; 4 – Ovalle; 5 – Alvarado; 7 – C. Mejía (substituted off) 66'; 12 – Martínez (substituted off) 81'; 26 – Salas; 29 – G. Mejía; 30 – Palacios; 33 – Chirinos; 55 – Gómez; Substitutes; 23 – Velásquez (substituted on) 66'; 13 – Costly (substituted on) 81' Coach (HON) Espinoza	Stadium: Estadio Excélsior; Referee: Melvin Matamoros

22 April 2018 Playoffs	Olimpia	2–1	Platense	Tegucigalpa
16:00	Chirinos 32'; Martínez 36' Starting XI (GK) Escober – 28; Álvarez – 2 Ovalle – 4 Alvarado – 5 (substituted off) 72' Martínez – 12; Paz – 17; (substituted off) 84' Salas – 26; G. Mejía – 29; J. Palacios – 30; (substituted off) 90' Chirinos – 33; Gómez – 55; Substitutes; (substituted on) 72' Velásquez – 23; (substituted on) 84' W. Palacios – 8 (substituted on) 90' C. Mejía – 7 Coach; Espinoza (HON)	Report	86' Winchester Starting XI; 1 – Zúniga (GK); 2 – Castro (substituted off) 40'; 4 – Norales; 6 – Palacios; 8 – Nieto; 16 – Cardona; 21 – Ramos (substituted off) 37'; 24 – Winchester; 25 – Mendoza; 30 – Benítez; 31 – Ávila; Substitutes; 15 – Aguilar (substituted on) 37' (substituted off) 60'; 10 – Álvarez (substituted on) 40'; 77 – Hay (substituted on) 60'; Coach (HON) Martínez	Stadium: Estadio Tiburcio Carías Andino; Referee: Héctor Rodríguez

- Olimpia won 2–1 on aggregate.

18 April 2018 Playoffs	Honduras Progreso	1–1	Real España	El Progreso
19:15	León 41' Starting XI (GK) Licona – 22; Ettienne – 4 Delgado – 6 (substituted off) 61' López – 7 Morales – 10; (substituted off) 77' Acevedo – 12; (substituted off) 77' León – 20; Smith – 21; Mencía – 23; Gutiérrez – 24; Sánchez – 31; Substitutes; (substituted on) 61' Cardona – 8 (substituted on) 77' Elvir – 11; (substituted on) 77' Andrade – 5 Coach; Londoño (COL)	Report	81' López Starting IX; 1 – Hernández (GK); 4 – Velásquez; 10 – Martínez (substituted off) 78'; 13 – Tejeda (substituted off) 59'; 15 – Vargas; 17 – Claros; 20 – Arévalo (substituted off) 59'; 23 – Delgado; 24 – Borjas; 28 – Oseguera; 38 – Benavídez; Substitutes; 19 – López (substituted on) 59'; 16 – Zalazar (substituted on) 59'; 5 – Flores (substituted on) 78'; Coach (URU) García	Stadium: Estadio Humberto Micheletti; Referee: Óscar Moncada

21 April 2018 Playoffs	Real España	0–0	Honduras Progreso	San Pedro Sula
19:00	Starting IX (GK) Hernández – 1 Velásquez – 4 (substituted off) 46' Martínez – 10; (substituted off) 67' Vargas – 15; Zalazar – 16; Claros – 17; López – 19; Delgado – 23; Borjas – 24; Oseguera – 28; (substituted off) 74' Benavídez – 38; Substitutues; (substituted on) 46' Tejeda – 13; (substituted on) 67' Arévalo – 20; (substituted on) 74' Altamirano – 14; Coach; García (URU)	Report	Starting IX; 22 – Licona (GK); 4 – Ettienne; 6 – Delgado; 7 – López; 10 – Morales (substituted off) 68'; 12 – Acevedo; 20 – León (substituted off) 81'; 21 – Smith; 23 – Mencía; 24 – Gutiérrez; 31 – Sánchez; Substitutes; 8 – Cardona (substituted on) 68'; 11 – Elvir (substituted on) 81' Coach (COL) Londoño	Stadium: Estadio General Francisco Morazán; Referee: Armando Castro

- Real España 1–1 Honduras Progreso on aggregate. Real España advanced on regular season record.

28 April 2018 Semifinals	Real España	0–1	Marathón	San Pedro Sula
19:00	Starting IX (GK) Hernández – 1 Velásquez – 4 Tejeda – 13; Vargas – 15; Zalazar – 16; (substituted off) 67' Claros – 17; López – 19; (substituted off) 73' Borjas – 24; Oseguera – 28; Benavídez – 38; (substituted off) 56' Quiroz – 45; Substitutes; (substituted on) 53' Martínez – 10; (substituted on) 67' Delgado – 23; (substituted on) 73' Flores – 5 Coach; García (URU)	Report	50' Arboleda Starting IX; 25 – Torres (GK); 3 – Córdova; 6 – Suazo; 8 – Lacayo; 15 – Espinoza (substituted off) 77'; 16 – Banegas; 23 – Leverón; 24 – Lahera (substituted off) 56'; 27 – Arboleda; 29 – Johnson; 38 – Martínez (substituted off) 67'; Substitutes; 2 – Bernárdez (substituted on) 56'; 17 – Fuentes (substituted on) 67'; 7 – Rodríguez (substituted on) 77'; Coach (ARG) Vargas	Stadium: Estadio General Francisco Morazán; Attendance: 7,563; Referee: Melvin Matamoros

5 May 2018 Semifinals	Marathón	2–1	Real España	San Pedro Sula
15:00	Leverón 4' (pen.); Lahera 50' Starting XI (GK) Torres – 25; Córdova – 3 Suazo – 6 Lacayo – 8 (substituted off) 52' Espinoza – 15; Banegas – 16; Leverón – 23; (substituted off) 50' Lahera – 24; Arboleda – 27; Johnson – 29; (substituted off) 62' Martínez – 38; Substitutes; (substituted on) 50' Bernárdez – 2 (substituted on) 52' Villanueva – 49; (substituted on) 62' Fuentes – 17; Coach; Vargas (ARG)	Report	89' (pen.) Martínez Starting XI; 1 – Hernández (GK); 4 – Velásquez; 10 – Martínez; 13 – Tejeda; 15 – Vargas (substituted off) 46'; 16 – Zalazar (substituted off) 65'; 19 – López; 23 – Delgado; 28 – Oseguera; 38 – Benavídez; 44 – Barahona (substituted off) 46'; Substitutes; 20 – Arévalo (substituted on) 46'; 37 – Guevara (substituted on) 46'; 14 – Altamirano (substituted on) 65'; Coach (URU) García	Stadium: Estadio Yankel Rosenthal; Attendance: 5,545; Referee: Héctor Rodríguez

- Marathón won 3–1 on aggregate.

29 April 2018 Semifinals	Olimpia	0–0	Motagua	Tegucigalpa
16:00	Starting IX (GK) Escober – 28; Álvarez – 2 Ovalle – 4 Alvarado – 5 (substituted off) 78' Martínez – 12; Paz – 17; (substituted off) 72' Salas – 26; G. Mejía – 29; J. Palacios – 30; Chirinos – 33; (substituted off) 83' Gómez – 55; Substitutes; (substituted on) 72' W. Palacios – 8 (substituted on) 78' Costly – 13; (substituted on) 83' C. Mejía – 7 Coach; Espinoza (HON)	Report	Starting IX; 19 – Rougier (GK); 2 – Montes; 3 – Figueroa; 6 – Mayorquín; 7 – Discua (substituted off) 75'; 9 – Castillo; 10 – Andino (substituted off) 83'; 12 – Santos; 16 – Castellanos; 17 – Maldonado; 27 – Crisanto; Substitutes; 14 – Mayenfisch (substituted on) 75'; 22 – Estupiñán (substituted on) 83' Coach (ARG) Vásquez	Stadium: Estadio Tiburcio Carías Andino; Referee: Saíd Martínez

6 May 2018 Semifinals	Motagua	1–1	Olimpia	Tegucigalpa
16:00	Martínez 76' Starting XI (GK) Rougier – 19; (substituted off) 72' Montes – 2 Figueroa – 3 (substituted off) 46' Mayorquín – 6 Discua – 7 Castillo – 9 Andino – 10; (substituted off) 46' Santos – 12; Castellanos – 16; W. Crisanto – 18; F. Crisanto – 27; Substitutes; (substituted on) 46' Elvir – 24; (substituted on) 46' Martínez – 8 (substituted on) 72' Estupiñán – 22; Coach; Vásquez (ARG)	Report	39' Costly Starting IX; 28 – Escober (GK); 2 – Álvarez; 4 – Ovalle; 5 – Alvarado; 7 – Mejía; 12 – Martínez (substituted off) 71'; 13 – Costly; 16 – Rodas; 17 – Paz; 30 – J. Palacios; 33 – Chirinos (substituted off) 66'; Substitutes; 6 – Castillo (substituted on) 66'; 8 – W. Palacios (substituted on) 71' Coach(HON); Espinoza	Stadium: Estadio Tiburcio Carías Andino; Referee: Óscar Moncada

- Motagua 1–1 Olimpia on aggregate. Motagua advanced on regular season record.

13 May 2018 Final	Motagua	1–1	Marathón	Tegucigalpa
16:00	Discua 27'	Report	41' Martínez	Stadium: Estadio Tiburcio Carías Andino; Referee: Melvin Matamoros

19 May 2018 Final	Marathón	0–0 (a.e.t.) (5–4 p)	Motagua	San Pedro Sula
14:00		Report		Stadium: Estadio Yankel Rosenthal
	Penalties
	Leverón (penalty missed); Banegas (penalty scored); Vargas (penalty scored); Suazo (penalty scored); Rodríguez (penalty scored); Johnson (penalty scored)		(penalty scored) Crisanto; (penalty scored) Montes; (penalty scored) Martínez; (penalty missed) Pereira; (penalty scored) Elvir; (penalty missed) Mayorquín

- Marathón 1–1 Motagua on aggregate. Marathón won 5–4 on penalty shoot-outs.

== Top goalscorers ==
The top goalscorer was determined by the addition of goals of both Apertura and Clausura tournaments.

As of 19 May 2018

- 24 goals:

(Colombia) Justin Arboleda (Marathón)

- 23 goals:

(Honduras) Román Castillo (Motagua)

- 14 goals:

(Grenada) Jamal Charles (Vida)

- 12 goals:

(Panama) Brunet Hay (Platense)
(Honduras) Carlos Lanza (Juticalpa)

- 11 goals:

(Honduras) Jairo Róchez (UPNFM)

- 10 goals:

(Honduras) Darixon Vuelto (Real España)
(Honduras) Ángel Tejeda (Real España)
(Honduras) Carlo Costly (Olimpia)
(Honduras) Júnior Lacayo (Marathón)
(Honduras) Franco Güity (Juticalpa)
(Honduras) Osman Melgares (Real Sociedad)
(Honduras) Brayan Velásquez (Olimpia)

- 9 goals:

(Honduras) Michaell Chirinos (Olimpia)
(Honduras) Mario Martínez (Real España)
(Honduras) Diego Reyes (Real Sociedad / Olimpia)
Carlos Sánchez (Honduras Progreso)

- 8 goals:

(Honduras) Roger Rojas (Olimpia)
(Honduras) Iván López (Real España)
(Honduras) Víctor Moncada (Vida / Juticalpa)
(Honduras) Walter Martínez (Motagua)
(Colombia) Javier Estupiñán (Olimpia / Motagua)

- 7 goals:

(Honduras) Marco Vega (Motagua)
(Honduras) Alexander Aguilar (Platense)
Frelys López (Honduras Progreso)
(Guatemala) Gerson Tinoco (Juticalpa)
(Argentina) Domingo Zalazar (Real España)
(Honduras) Mayron Flores (UPNFM)
(Cuba) Yaudel Lahera (Marathón)

- 6 goals:

Franklyn Morales (Honduras Progreso)
(Honduras) Rony Martínez (Olimpia)
(Honduras) Juan Ocampo (Juticalpa)
(Honduras) Christian Altamirano (Real España)

- 5 goals:

(Honduras) Hilder Colón (Juticalpa)
(Trinidad and Tobago) Jerrel Britto (H. Progreso / R. Sociedad)
(Honduras) Elmer Güity (Juticalpa)
(Honduras) Eddie Hernández (Motagua)

- 4 goals:

(Honduras) Román Valencia (UPNFM)
(Honduras) Edder Delgado (Real España)
(Honduras) Jorge Benguché (Olimpia / UPNFM)
(Honduras) Juan Rodríguez (Marathón)
(Honduras) Johnny Leverón (Marathón)
Jorge Cardona (Honduras Progreso)
(Honduras) John Suazo (Marathón)
(Honduras) Brayan Ramírez (Juticalpa)
(Honduras) Jhow Benavídez (Real España)
(Honduras) Henry Romero (Marathón)
(Honduras) Júnior Padilla (UPNFM)
(Honduras) Wilmer Crisanto (Motagua)
(Trinidad and Tobago) Rundell Winchester (Platense)

- 3 goals:

(Honduras) Shannon Welcome (Real Sociedad)
(Colombia) James Cabezas (Juticalpa)
(Colombia) Roberto Riascos (Real Sociedad)
(Honduras) Arnold Meléndez (UPNFM)
(Trinidad and Tobago) Akeem Roach (Vida)
(Honduras) Joshua Nieto (Platense)
Pedro Mencía (Honduras Progreso)
(Honduras) Carlos Discua (Motagua)
(Honduras) Marlon Ramírez (Juticalpa)
(Honduras) Alexander López (Olimpia)
(Honduras) Cristian Cálix (Marathón)
(Honduras) Bryan Martínez (Marathón)

- 2 goals:

(Uruguay) Claudio Cardozo (Real España)
(Honduras) Omar Elvir (Motagua)
(Honduras) Ever Alvarado (Olimpia)
(Honduras) Ronald Montoya (UPNFM)
(Honduras) César Guillén (Vida)
(Honduras) Kervin Arriaga (Platense)
(Honduras) Juan Montes (Motagua)
(Honduras) Jesús Canales (Olimpia)
(Honduras) Reinieri Mayorquín (Motagua)
(Honduras) Luis Palma (Vida)
(Honduras) Luis Lobo (Platense)
(Honduras) Carlos Róchez (UPNFM)
(Honduras) Kevin Álvarez (Olimpia)
Chestyn Onofre (Honduras Progreso / Vida)
(Honduras) Bryan Johnson (H. Progreso / Marathón)
(Honduras) Kevin López (Motagua)
(Trinidad and Tobago) André Ettienne (Honduras Progreso)
Edwin León (Honduras Progreso)
Henry Martínez (Honduras Progreso)
(Honduras) Rossel Cacho (Real Sociedad)
(Honduras) Bayron Méndez (Olimpia / Platense)
(Honduras) Ian Osorio (Platense)
(Honduras) Allan Banegas (Marathón)
(Honduras) Jeancarlo Vargas (Platense)
(Honduras) Michael Osorio (Vida)
(Honduras) Allans Vargas (Real España)
(Honduras) Carlos Mejía (Olimpia)

- 1 goal:

(Honduras) Óscar Salas (Olimpia)
(Honduras) Patrick Palacios (Real España)
Pastor Martínez (Honduras Progreso)
(Honduras) Kendrick Cárcamo (Real Sociedad)
(Honduras) Pablo Arzú (Real Sociedad)
(Argentina) Fabián Castillo (Platense)
(Honduras) Esdras Padilla (Juticalpa)
(Uruguay) Richard Rodríguez (Vida)
(Honduras) Carlos Palacios (Vida)
(Honduras) Mario Berríos (Marathón)
(Honduras) César Oseguera (Real España)
(Honduras) Nixon Duarte (Juticalpa)
(Honduras) Lázaro Yánez (UPNFM)
(Honduras) Javier Portillo (Vida)
(Colombia) Luis Castro (Platense)
(Honduras) José Reyes (Olimpia)
(Honduras) Édgar Álvarez (Platense)
(Honduras) Secundino Martínez (Real Sociedad)
(Honduras) Henry Figueroa (Motagua)
(Honduras) Joshua Vargas (Marathón)
(Honduras) José Tobías (Olimpia)
Frédixon Elvir (Honduras Progreso)
(Honduras) Mario Flores (Real Sociedad)
(Honduras) Clinton Arzú (UPNFM)
(Honduras) José Arévalo (Real España)
(Honduras) Hermes Castillo (UPNFM)
(Honduras) Cholby Martínez (Platense)
Kevin Caminos (Honduras Progreso)
(Honduras) Robbie Matute (Real Sociedad)
(Honduras) Rigoberto Padilla (UPNFM)
(Honduras) Sergio Peña (Real Sociedad)
(Honduras) Nissi Sauceda (UPNFM)
(Honduras) Maycol Montero (UPNFM)
(Honduras) José Murillo (Juticalpa)
(Honduras) Miguel Flores (Vida)
Juan Delgado (Honduras Progreso)
(Honduras) Erick Andino (Motagua)
(Honduras) Enuar Salgado (Real Sociedad)
(Honduras) Brayan García (Vida)
Mariano Acevedo (Honduras Progreso)
(Honduras) Brayan Figueroa (Platense)
(Honduras) Roby Norales (Platense)
(Honduras) Marvin Bernárdez (Vida)
(Honduras) Óliver Morazán (Juticalpa)
(Honduras) Marcelo Pereira (Motagua)
(Honduras) Dílmer Gutiérrez (Real Sociedad)
(Honduras) Gerson Rodas (Olimpia)
(Honduras) Elder Torres (Vida)
(Honduras) Aldo Oviedo (Juticalpa)
(Honduras) Eduardo Martínez (Real España)
(Saint Lucia) Malik St. Prix (Vida)

- 1 own goal:

(Honduras) Michael Osorio (Vida)
(Honduras) Omar Elvir (Motagua)
(Honduras) José Quiroz (Real España)
(Honduras) Wilfredo Barahona (Real España)
(Honduras) Jeffri Flores (Platense)
(Honduras) Bryan Bernárdez (Marathón)
(Colombia) Luis Castro (Platense)
(Honduras) Marcos Martínez (Platense)
(Colombia) Justin Arboleda (Marathón)
(Costa Rica) Roy Smith (Honduras Progreso)
(Honduras) Luis Lobo (Platense)
(Honduras) Getsel Montes (Real España)
(Honduras) Sergio Peña (Real Sociedad)
(Honduras) Juan Montes (Motagua)
(Honduras) Hilder Colón (Juticalpa)

== Aggregate table ==
Relegation was determined by the aggregated table of both Apertura and Clausura tournaments. On 15 April 2018, C.D. Real Sociedad and Platense F.C. faced in the last round. Coincidentally, these were the only two clubs at this point involved with relegation risks. Platense won 0–1 at Estadio Francisco Martínez Durón and thus sending Real Sociedad to Liga de Ascenso.

Pos	Team	Pld	W	D	L	GF	GA	GD	Pts	Qualification or relegation
1	Marathón	36	22	5	9	62	44	+18	71	2019 CONCACAF Champions League
2	Motagua	36	19	10	7	60	38	+22	67	2018 CONCACAF League
3	Olimpia	36	18	10	8	61	34	+27	64	
4	Real España	36	16	9	11	53	44	+9	57	2018 CONCACAF League
5	Juticalpa	36	13	6	17	64	62	+2	45	
6	Vida	36	10	12	14	38	42	−4	42	
7	UPNFM	36	12	6	18	40	55	−15	42	
8	Platense	36	12	5	19	42	64	−22	41	
9	Honduras Progreso	36	12	3	21	48	67	−19	39	
10	Real Sociedad	36	9	8	19	33	51	−18	35	Relegation to Liga de Ascenso

Updated to match(es) played on 15 April 2018. Source:

== Awards ==
The 2017–18 season awards were published on 24 September 2018 as follows:

- Goalkeeper of the year: Jonathan Rougier (F.C. Motagua)
- Coach of the year: Héctor Vargas (C.D. Marathón)
- Top goalscorer: Justin Arboleda (C.D. Marathón)
- MVP: Carlos Sánchez (C.D. Honduras Progreso)
- Rookie of the year: Carlos Mejía (C.D.S. Vida)
- Referee of the year: Óscar Moncada
- Best reserves coach: Francisco Pavón (C.D.S. Vida)
- Reserves goalscorer: Foslyn Grant (F.C. Motagua)

== Controversies ==
- In August 2017, former Real C.D. España player Javier Portillo sued the club due to a non-paid contract expiring in 2018. Portillo was sacked in October 2016 for unsporting conduct and passed over the agreement. The National Football Arbitration Court (TNAF) determined that the club must comply with the contract and pay Portillo the sum of L.1,050,000.00 before the start of the Apertura tournament. On 5 August 2017, Real España played their first game of the season defeating Platense F.C. at Estadio Francisco Morazán. A few hours prior, the club had issued a non-negotiable check payable to TNAF and not to Portillo as the verdict demanded. As a result, and according to the league's disciplinary codes, these breaches are penalized with the deduction of points until the debt is condoned, or even relegation to a lower tier. On 10 August 2017, Fuad Abufele, president of Real España, threatened to withdraw from the league if any points are deducted. A week later, Real España did finally issue the check payable to Portillo and the Appeal Commission decided not to deduct any points from Real España, thus contradicting their own regulations. Real España, however, is willing to take the case further to FIFA.
- Due to a referee's strike who were demanding an increase in their salary, the entire week 3 in the Apertura tournament was suspended and had to be rescheduled. The tournament was resumed on week 4 and due to the tight schedule, the pending games were played during a FIFA International Match Calendar.
- On weeks 7 and 12, C.D. Marathón's defender Caue Fernandes injured Carlo Costly against Club Deportivo Olimpia and Eddie Hernández against F.C. Motagua respectively. Both injuries included serious fractures which had left both players out of competition for several weeks and consequently missing important World Cup qualifying matches. In both occasions, Costly strongly criticized Fernandes for his actions calling him a #pig on his Twitter account.
- Real C.D. España lost their fifth consecutive game in week 14 against last placed Platense F.C. Due to the poor results, president Fuad Abufele publicly threatened the players by revealing that their salary was partially frozen. Additionally, he stated that if the team doesn't react on time, their players might have bitter Christmas.
- During the elaboration of the Clausura schedule on 9 December 2017, both F.C. Motagua and Lobos UPNFM elected to move some of their home games to Estadio Emilio Williams Agasse in Choluteca, the further south stadium in Honduras. This wasn't seen with good eyes by northern clubs such as C.D.S. Vida and C.D. Real Sociedad claiming the distance they have to travel to get there.
- During the Apertura postseason, Allan Pineda, director of the Regional Commission of Discipline, was strongly criticized by the media and specially by F.C. Motagua's foremen, due to his inconsistency when interpreting and enforcing the law. Right before the semifinals, the entity penalized Club Deportivo Olimpia's midfielder Alexander López for one game only due to his violent conduct and a straight red card in a playoff game against Lobos UPNFM. López complied and was eligible to play against Motagua in the semifinals. However, the controversy arose when back in November UPNFM's midfielder Mayron Flores was given two games of suspension for exactly the same actions during a regular season match, consequently missing action against Olimpia in the playoffs. Pineda is known for being an Olimpia's supporter.
- On 13 December 2017, Real C.D. España and C.D. Marathón were playing for the first leg of the Apertura semifinals. In the 71st minute, the referee Armando Castro called a non-existing penalty for Real España. Due to the controversial decision the Marathón's barra brava invaded the pitch and started trowing rocks at the referees and policemen. Real España's fans followed and tried to confront their rival's counterpart creating a chaos which ended up in the release of tear gas bombs. The game was suspended and was finally resumed eight days later on 21 December. The final 19 minutes of play were restarted with the penalty called one week prior in what was known as the longest match ever played in Honduras.
- Prior the beginning of the Clausura tournament, five clubs (C.D. Honduras Progreso, C.D. Marathón, Platense F.C., C.D. Real Sociedad and C.D.S. Vida) which represents 50% of the league, declared themselves financially inoperative and unwilling to start the competition unless the league or the government provides them with at least L.4,000,000 to each team to help them heal some debts. Ironically, most of these clubs made notorious signings during the off-season. In the end, the league managed to obtain a loan for a fraction of the amount originally requested. Consequently, the entire schedule was postponed for one week.
- On week 4 of the Clausura tournament, Lobos UPNFM traveled to Tocoa to play against C.D. Real Sociedad. The visiting team claimed that the away locker rooms didn't meet the basic requirements for a professional competition. Coach Salomón Nazar complained that the dressing rooms didn't have water for his players to take showers after the match, having to do so outdoors with buckets. In addition to that, the field itself presented evident deterioration due to the constant rainfall before and during the game. A great percentage of the field was covered in water and some sections even showed absence of grass, implying a great risk to the player's integrity. After a series of complains by the affected visiting teams and reporters, the owners of Estadio Francisco Martínez Durón banned the access to the media.
- On 10 March, F.C. Motagua's forward Román Castillo scored his 73rd goal with his club. Some media, statistic experts and historians claim that former player Ángel Obando scored 77 goals with Motagua between 1974 and 1986 and he has been the club's top-goalscorer for over 40 years. However, Motagua published on their social accounts their own list where Obando appears at the top of the list but with 73 goals only. If the club's numbers are correct, Castillo was now sharing the record along with Obando. The league was consulted by a local newspaper about the controversy to clarify this and to have an official version. Nevertheless, the league refused to publish their version unless the club inquires it in writing.
- In less than a week, Real C.D. España's executives were involved in two controversial discussions with their C.D. Marathón's and F.C. Motagua's counterparts. On week 14 of the Clausura tournament, Real España's forward Domingo Zalazar was roughly injured by Marathón's defender Bryan Johnson. Real España accused Marathón players for their supposedly deliberately actions to harm their rivals. Ronlin Peña, the sport manager of Marathón, called Real España's front-men short minded. Some Real España fans even showed up to Marathón's headquarters threatening Johnson. That same week, during the Honduran Superclásico between Motagua and Club Deportivo Olimpia, a riot occurred outside the stadium resulting in one dead, several injured and more detained. Real España's president Elías Burbara posted on his Twitter account that he hoped for a punishment to the Tegucigalpa's clubs like the one they received last season for similar incidents. Motagua's president Pedro Atala replied saying that they usually never interfere into other's business and don't wish harm to their competitors.
