= Henry Romero =

Henry Romero may refer to:

- Henry Romero (Salvadoran footballer) (born 1991), Salvadoran football defender
- Henry Romero (Honduran footballer) (born 1996), Honduran football forward
