= Zalazar =

Zalazar is a surname. Notable people with the surname include:

- Domingo Zalazar (born 1986), Argentine footballer
- José Zalazar (born 1963), Uruguayan footballer
- Kuki Zalazar (born 1998), Spanish footballer
- Rodrigo Zalazar (born 1999), Uruguayan footballer
- Víctor Zalazar (born 1935), Argentine boxer
