= Bodeen =

Bodeen is a surname. Notable people with the surname include:

- DeWitt Bodeen (1908–1988), American screenwriter
- S. A. Bodeen, American writer

== See also ==
- Boden (surname)
- The BoDeans
