= Boden (surname) =

Boden is a surname. Notable people with the surname include:

- Alana Boden (born 1997), English actress
- Alec Boden (1925–2011), Scottish footballer
- Anna Boden (born 1979), American filmmaker
- Anne Boden (born 1960), Welsh tech entrepreneur and founder of Starling Bank
- Andrew Boden (died 1835), American politician
- Brigid Boden born 1962), Irish singer
- Bob Boden (born 1959), American television producer
- Chaz Boden (born 1997), British Voice Actor
- Falk Boden (born 1960), German cyclist
- Fernand Boden (born 1943), politician from Luxembourg
- Jens Boden (born 1978), German speed skater
- Johnnie Boden (born 1961), English entrepreneur, founder of Boden catalogue clothing company
- Jon Boden (born 1977) English musician and folk singer
- Joseph Boden (died 1811), founder of the Boden Professorship of Sanskrit at Oxford University
- Josh Boden (born 1986), Canadian football player
- Leonard Boden (1911–1999), British portrait painter
- Luke Boden (born 1988), English footballer
- Lynn Boden (born 1953), American football player
- Margaret Boden (1936–2025), British artificial intelligence researcher
- Margaret Boden (artist) (1912–2001), Scottish artist, wife of Leonard
- Margarete Himmler, née Boden (1893–1967), wife of SS chief Heinrich Himmler
- Patrik Bodén (born 1967), Swedish javelin thrower
- Peter Boden (born 1947), British sports shooter
- Ron Boden (1936–2015), Australian rugby footballer
- Samuel Boden (1826–1882), English chess master
- Scott Boden (born 1989), English footballer
- Wilhelm Boden (1890–1961), German politician

== See also ==
- Bodden (disambiguation)
- Bodin (surname)
