= John Bodden (footballer) =

Honduran footballer (born 1981)

Personal information
- Full name: John Alston Hoore Bodden
- Date of birth: 3 October 1981 (age 45)
- Place of birth: La Ceiba, Honduras
- Height: 1.78 m (5 ft 10 in)
- Position: Goalkeeper

Team information
- Current team: Marathón

Senior career*
Years	Team	Apps	(Gls)
2000–2001	Deportes Savio	13	(0)
2001–2010	Victoria		(0)
2010–2012	Necaxa		(0)
2012–2014	Victoria	51	(1)
2014	Sportivo Luqueño	0	(0)
2014–16	Victoria	30	(0)
2016–	Marathón	51	(0)

International career^{‡}
2007–2009	Honduras	7	(0)
- * Club domestic league appearances and goals as of 2007 ‡ National team caps and goals as of 2008-02-01

John Alston Hoore Bodden (born 3 October 1981) is a Honduran former goalkeeper who last played for C.D. Marathón of the Liga Nacional de Fútbol Profesional de Honduras in 2019.

== Club career ==
Bodden made his debut for Deportes Savio in the Liga Nacional de Fútbol de Honduras on a 4–1 defeat against Broncos UNAH on 11 April 2001. He was released by Necaxa before the 2012 Apertura season.

== International career ==
He made his debut for the national side on 22 August 2007 in a friendly against El Salvador and has, as of July 2012, earned 5 caps. He has represented his country at the 2009 UNCAF Nations Cup and was a non-playing squad member at the 2003 and 2009 CONCACAF Gold Cups.

== Career statistics ==
=== Club ===
Club	Season	League		Total	
Club	Season	Apps	Goals	Apps	Goals
Necaxa	2012 Clausura	11	0	11	0

== Honours and awards ==
=== Club ===
C.D. Marathón

- Liga Profesional de Honduras: 2017–18 C
- Honduran Cup: 2017
- Honduran Supercup: 2019
