= Denovan Torres =

Honduran football player (born 1989)

Personal information
- Full name: Denovan Galileo Torres Pérez
- Date of birth: 4 October 1989 (age 37)
- Place of birth: Honduras
- Position: Goalkeeper

Team information
- Current team: Marathón
- Number: 25

Senior career*
Years	Team	Apps	(Gls)
2013–	Marathón	125	(0)
- * Club domestic league appearances and goals as of 22:50, 6 April 2021 (UTC)

Denovan Galileo Torres Pérez (born 4 October 1989) is a Honduran professional footballer who plays as a goalkeeper for Liga Nacional club Marathón.

== Club career ==
Torres made his professional debut for Liga Nacional club Marathón on 15 October 2014 against Victoria, starting in a 1–1 draw. During the 2018–19 season, Torres became the number one goalkeeper for Marathón, starting over 37 matches that season. On 20 February 2019, Torres made his international club debut for Marathón in the CONCACAF Champions League against Santos Laguna, starting in the 6–2 defeat.

On 3 November 2020, Torres helped Marathón qualify for the CONCACAF Champions League via the CONCACAF League. In the match against Antigua, Torres saved two penalties during the shootout to help his club qualify.

== International career ==
On 26 March 2019, Torres made an appearance for Honduras on the bench in a friendly against Ecuador.

== Career statistics ==
As of match played 6 April 2021

Appearances and goals by club, season and competition
Club	Season	League			Cup		Continental		Total	
Club	Season	Division	Apps	Goals	Apps	Goals	Apps	Goals	Apps	Goals
Marathón	2014–15	Liga Nacional	6	0	—	—	—	—	6	0
Marathón	2015–16	Liga Nacional	12	0	—	—	—	—	12	0
Marathón	2016–17	Liga Nacional	12	0	—	—	—	—	12	0
Marathón	2017–18	Liga Nacional	10	0	—	—	—	—	10	0
Marathón	2018–19	Liga Nacional	37	0	—	—	2	0	39	0
Marathón	2019–20	Liga Nacional	20	0	—	—	2	0	22	0
Marathón	2020–21	Liga Nacional	28	0	—	—	2	0	30	0
Marathón	Total		125	0	0	0	6	0	131	0
Career total			125	0	0	0	6	0	131	0

== Honours ==
Marathón

- Honduran Cup: 2017
