= Bodden Town =

Bodden Town may refer to the following in Grand Cayman in the Cayman Islands:

- Bodden Town (village)
- Bodden Town (district)
- Bodden Town FC, a football club from Bodden Town

== See also ==
- Bodden Town Mission House, Grand Cayman
- Bodden (disambiguation)
