= Martín García (footballer, born 1976) =

Uruguayan footballer

Personal information
- Full name: Martín Adrián García Curbelo
- Date of birth: 26 March 1976 (age 50)
- Place of birth: Pando, Uruguay
- Height: 1.81 m (5 ft 11 in)
- Position: Striker

Senior career*
Years	Team	Apps	(Gls)
1995–1997	Peñarol		
1998	Villa Española	10	(0)
1998	Almagro	3	(0)
1999	Bella Vista	11	(5)
1999–2000	Peñarol		
2001	Shanghai Zhongyuan		
2002	Peñarol		
2002–2003	Pumas UNAM	22	(4)
2003–2005	Peñarol		
2005–2008	Olimpia	66	(26)
2008	Defensor Sporting	5	(0)
2009	Melgar	5	(2)
2009	Sportivo Luqueño	10	(1)
2010–2011	Independiente FBC	2	(0)

Managerial career
- 2012: Independiente FBC
- 2017–2018: Real España
- 2019: Deportivo Santaní
- 2019: Boston River
- 2020: Danubio
- 2020: Racing Montevideo
- 2021–2022: Marathón
- 2022–2023: Miramar Misiones
- 2023: Zacapa
- 2024: Rampla Juniors
- * Club domestic league appearances and goals

Martín Adrián García Curbelo (born 26 March 1976) is a Uruguayan football manager and former player who played as a forward.

García played for Peñarol, Villa Española and Bella Vista of Uruguay, Club Almagro of Argentina, Pumas UNAM of Mexico and the Paraguayan side Olimpia. In 2017, he made Real España Honduran champions as manager after beating F.C. Motagua 3-2 aggregated score since 2013.

== Honours ==
=== Player ===
Peñarol

- Uruguayan Primera División: 1995, 1996, 1997, 1999, 2003
