= Bodden (disambiguation) =

Bodden are briny bodies of water often forming lagoons, along the southwestern shores of the Baltic Sea.

Bodden may also refer to:

- Alonzo Bodden (born 1962), American comedian and actor
- Annie Huldah Bodden (1908-1989), Caymanian civil servant, lawyer, and politician
- Christie Bodden (born 1990), Panamanian former swimmer
- Jacob Bodden (1831-1889), member of the Wisconsin State Assembly
- John Alston Bodden (born 1981), Honduran association football goalkeeper
- Leigh Bodden (born 1981), former American football cornerback
- Olaf Bodden (born 1968), German former football striker
- Truman Bodden (born 1945), Caymanian politician
- Bodden Town (disambiguation), Grand Cayman, Cayman Islands

== See also ==
- Edward Bodden Airfield, Little Cayman, Cayman Islands
- Haig Bodden Stadium, Bodden Town, Cayman Islands
- Truman Bodden Sports Complex, George Town, Cayman Islands
