= Johnny Leverón =

Honduran footballer (born 1990)

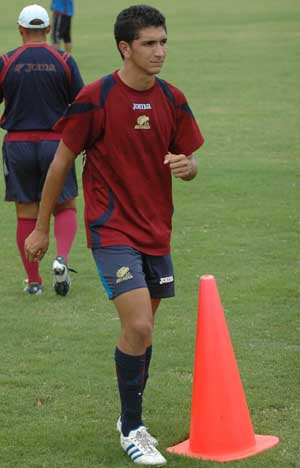

Personal information
- Full name: Johnny Harold Leverón Uclés
- Date of birth: 7 February 1990 (age 36)
- Place of birth: Yoro, Honduras
- Height: 1.80 m (5 ft 11 in)
- Positions: Defender; midfielder

Team information
- Current team: Guanacasteca
- Number: 16

Youth career
- 2007–2009: Promesas

Senior career*
Years	Team	Apps	(Gls)
2009–2013	Motagua	83	(9)
2013–2014	Vancouver Whitecaps FC	34	(0)
2015	Marathón	18	(1)
2015–2017	Correcaminos UAT	48	(3)
2017–2018	Marathón	37	(4)
2018–2019	Real España	34	(4)
2019–2022	Olimpia	63	(1)
2022–2023	Lobos UPNFM	34	(9)
2023–2024	Marathón	25	(0)
2024–	Guanacasteca	25	(0)

International career^{‡}
2007	Honduras U17	9	(4)
2008–2009	Honduras U20	12	(1)
2010	Honduras U21	2	(0)
2011–2012	Honduras U23	7	(1)
2010–2023	Honduras	45	(4)
Medal record
Honduras
Third place	CONCACAF U-20 Championship	2009
- * Club domestic league appearances and goals as of 15 April 2025 ‡ National team caps and goals as of 28 March 2023

Johnny Harold Leverón Uclés (born 7 February 1990) is a Honduran international footballer who plays for Costa Rican club Guanacasteca.

== Career ==
=== Club ===
In December 2008, he signed for F.C. Motagua, and played with the Honduran club until 2012. Leverón made his official debut in the Honduran league on 19 April 2009 with Motagua in the 3–6 defeat against Marathón in San Pedro Sula. While with Motagua he appeared in 83 league matches and scored nine goals.

In January 2013 it was revealed his agent was looking for a move abroad. In February 2013 he signed a contract to play in MLS for Vancouver Whitecaps FC.

In 2015 Levenón signed for Mexican Ascenso MX team, Correcaminos UAT.

=== International ===
Leverón represented Honduras in the 2007 Pan American Games in Rio Janeiro. He was captain of the under 17 team and scored three goals for his squad. He also played in the 2007 FIFA U-17 World Cup in Korea and at the 2009 FIFA U-20 World Cup in Egypt.

He made his senior debut for Honduras in an April 2010 friendly match against Venezuela and has, as of January 2013, earned a total of 22 caps, scoring 3 goals. He has represented his country in one FIFA World Cup qualification match and played at the 2012 Summer Olympics. He also played at the 2011 UNCAF Nations Cups as well as at the 2011 CONCACAF Gold Cup.

== Career statistics ==
=== International goals ===
No.	Date	Venue	Opponent	Score	Result	Competition
1	18 December 2010	Estadio Olímpico Metropolitano, San Pedro Sula, Honduras	Panama	1–0	2–1	Friendly
2	18 December 2010	Estadio Olímpico Metropolitano, San Pedro Sula, Honduras	Panama	2–1	2–1	Friendly
3	21 January 2011	Estadio Rommel Fernández, Panama City, Panama	El Salvador	1–0	2–0	2011 Copa Centroamericana
4	13 July 2021	BBVA Stadium, Houston, United States	Grenada	3–0	4–0	2021 CONCACAF Gold Cup

== Honours and awards ==
F.C. Motagua

- Liga Profesional de Honduras: 2010–11 C

C.D. Marathón

- Liga Profesional de Honduras: 2017–18 C

Honduras

- Copa Centroamericana: 2011
