= Juan Josué Rodríguez =

Honduran footballer (born 1988)

Personal information
- Full name: Juan Josué Rodríguez Leiva
- Date of birth: 16 January 1988 (age 38)
- Place of birth: San José de Copán, Honduras
- Height: 1.74 m (5 ft 9 in)
- Position: Midfielder

Team information
- Current team: Parrillas One
- Number: 7

Senior career*
Years	Team	Apps	(Gls)
2007–2012	Olimpia Occidental		
2012–2016	Parrillas One	62	(17)
2016–	Marathón	60	(14)

International career
2014	Honduras	5	(0)
- * Club domestic league appearances and goals as of 18:57, 13 October 2014 (UTC)

Juan Josué Rodríguez (born 16 January 1988) is a Honduran footballer who plays as a midfielder for Parrillas One.

== Club career ==
Nicknamed El Rambo, Rodríguez start his career in 2007 at Olimpia Occidental from the Liga Nacional de Ascenso de Honduras. Then, in 2012 he move to Parrillas One and his team was promoted to the Liga Nacional de Honduras a year later.

== International career ==
Rodríguez made his debut for the national side on 10 September 2014 in a match against Guatemala for the 2014 Copa Centroamericana (2–0 loss). He has represented his country at 2014 Copa Centroamericana and in some friendly matches.

== Honours ==
Parrillas One

- Liga Nacional de Ascenso de Honduras: 2013 Clausura

Marathón

- Liga Profesional de Honduras: 2017–18 C
- Honduran Cup: 2017
