= Franklin Flores (footballer) =

Honduran footballer (born 1996)

Personal information
- Full name: Franklin Geovany Flores Sacaza
- Date of birth: 18 May 1996 (age 30)
- Place of birth: Jutiapa, Honduras
- Height: 1.74 m (5 ft 9 in)
- Position: Defender

Team information
- Current team: Real España

Senior career*
| Years | Team | Apps | (Gls) |
| 2014–17 | Victoria | 21 | (0) |
| 2017– | Real España | 52 | (1) |

International career^{‡}
| 2020– | Honduras | 4 | (0) |
- * Club domestic league appearances and goals ‡ National team caps and goals as of 14:16, 19 January 2022 (UTC)

Franklin Geovany Flores Sacaza (born 18 May 1996) is a Honduran footballer who play for Real España in the top tier of football in Honduras.

== Career ==
In 2017, Flores spent three months trialing with various clubs in the English Premier League as well as the English second division.
