= Salomón Nazar =

Honduran footballer (born 1952)

Personal information
- Full name: José Salomón Nazar Ordóñez
- Date of birth: 7 August 1952 (age 74)
- Place of birth: Honduras
- Position: Goalkeeper

Senior career*
Years	Team	Apps	(Gls)
1972–1984	Pumas UNAH	201	(0)
1979–1980	Olimpia	5	(0)
1980–1981	Motagua	9	(0)
Total		215	(0)

International career
1973–1982	Honduras		

Managerial career
- 2011: UPNFM
- 2022-: C.D. Marathón
- * Club domestic league appearances and goals

José Salomón Nazar Ordóñez (born 7 August 1952) is a retired Honduran football goalkeeper who played for Honduras in the 1982 FIFA World Cup.

== Club career ==
Nicknamed Turco, Nazar played the majority of his career for Pumas UNAH, but also had two short spells at Club Deportivo Olimpia and F.C. Motagua.

== International career ==
Nazar represented Honduras in 1 FIFA World Cup qualification match and was a non-playing squad member at the 1982 World Cup.

== Administration ==
Nazar was secretary at Universidad during the 2000s. He was in charge of second tier UPNFM during the 2011 Clausura.
