= Brigid Boden =

Irish singer and songwriter

- Born: Dublin, Ireland
- Genres: Celtic, dance
- Instrument: Vocals
- Years active: 1996–present
- Website: brigidboden.com

Brigid Boden is an Irish singer and songwriter.

== Early life and education ==
Boden was born in Dublin Ireland. As a child, Boden studied dance there and later in New York City, culminating in a scholarship to the Dance Theatre of Harlem. She then moved to London to focus on songwriting.

== Career ==
After sending demo recordings to producer and musician Kevin Armstrong, Brigid signed with A&M/PolyGram Records and released one album in 1996, the lead single of which, "Oh, How I Cry", peaked at No. 44 on Billboard's Hot Dance Music/Club Play charts in 1997 with help of a remix by Todd Terry. A&M was absorbed by Interscope Records in 1999, and Boden did not release any new material until 2007, when a second album was released by Universal Records. She has also recorded music for several soundtracks, including Dead Man Walking and The Lord of the Rings: War of the Ring, and has begun recording her third album.

== Discography ==
- Brigid Boden (A&M/PolyGram Records, 1997)
- Innocence is Not a Crime (Universal Records, 2007)
- Dublin to Dakar (Putumayo)
- Blue Ocean suite (Kunduru Music)
- Buddha Bar presents Living Theatre/ vol 1/vol 2
- Buddha Bar/ Chill out in Paris vol 2
