= Kevin Hernández (footballer, born 1985) =

Honduran footballer

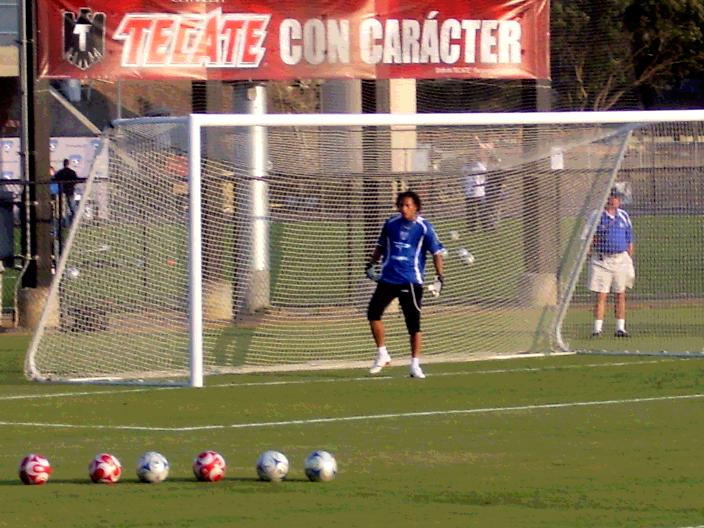

Personal information
- Full name: Kevin Vance Hernández Kirkconnell
- Date of birth: 21 December 1985 (age 40)
- Place of birth: Guanaja, Honduras
- Height: 5 ft 11 in (1.80 m)
- Position: Goalkeeper

Senior career*
Years	Team	Apps	(Gls)
2003–2008	Victoria	141	(0)
2008	Bella Vista	0	(0)
2009	Central Español		
2009–2018	Real España	?	(?)
2019–2022	Platense	1	(0)

International career^{‡}
2007–2008	Honduras U-23	9	(0)
2008–2014	Honduras	7	(0)
- * Club domestic league appearances and goals as of 27 January 2019 ‡ National team caps and goals as of 24 December 2018

Kevin Vance Hernández Kirkconnell (born 21 December 1985) is a Honduran football goalkeeper who currently plays for Platense in the Liga Nacional de Fútbol de Honduras.

== Club career ==
He began his career in 2003 with Club Victoria before moving abroad to join Uruguayan side Bella Vista. He moved to fellow Uruguayan outfit Central Español before the 2009 Clausura.

== International career ==
He is also part of the U-23 squad that are the Pre-Olympic champions of CONCACAF 2008 where he was voted best goalkeeper of the competition. He made his debut for the national side on 22 May 2008 in a friendly against Belize and earned his second and so far last cap in the same year against Haiti. He has represented his country at the 2008 Summer Olympics.
