= Caue Fernandes =

Brazilian footballer (born 1988)

Personal information
- Full name: Caue Fernandes Silveira
- Date of birth: 31 July 1988 (age 38)
- Place of birth: Santana do Livramento, Brazil
- Height: 1.84 m (6 ft 0 in)
- Position: Defender

Team information
- Current team: CD Marathón
- Number: 4

Senior career*
Years	Team	Apps	(Gls)
2008–2010	Juventud Las Piedras	26	(1)
2011–2013	El Tanque Sisley	7	(0)
2013–2015	Nacional Montevideo	0	(0)
2014	→ Liverpool Montevideo (loan)	14	(2)
2015–2016	Montevideo Wanderers	7	(0)
2016	El Tanque Sisley	10	(0)
2017	CD Marathón	33	(0)
2019–	CD Marathón	2	(0)
- * Club domestic league appearances and goals as of 21 March 2019

Caue Fernandes Silveira (born July 31, 1988) is a Brazilian footballer currently playing for CD Marathón of the Liga Nacional de Fútbol Profesional de Honduras.

== Honours and awards ==
=== Club ===
C.D. Marathón

- Honduran Cup: 2017
- Honduran Supercup: 2019
