= Allan Banegas =

Honduran footballer (born 1993)

Personal information
- Full name: Allan Alexander Banegas Murillo
- Date of birth: 4 October 1993 (age 33)
- Place of birth: Balfate, Honduras
- Height: 1.80 m (5 ft 11 in)
- Position: Central midfielder

Team information
- Current team: C.D. Olimpia
- Number: 8

Youth career
- Marathón

Senior career*
| Years | Team | Apps | (Gls) |
| 2014–2021 | Marathón | 177 | (5) |
| 2021– | C.D. Olimpia | 5 | (0) |

International career
| 2015–2016 | Honduras U-23 | 11 | (0) |
- * Club domestic league appearances and goals

Allan Banegas (born 4 October 1993) is a Honduran footballer. He represented Honduras in the football competition at the 2016 Summer Olympics., and plays as midfielder for C.D. Olimpia since January 2021.

== Honours and awards ==
=== Club ===
C.D. Marathón

- Liga Profesional de Honduras: 2017–18 C
- Honduran Cup: 2017
- Honduran Supercup: 2019
