= Jhow Benavídez =

Honduran footballer (born 1995)

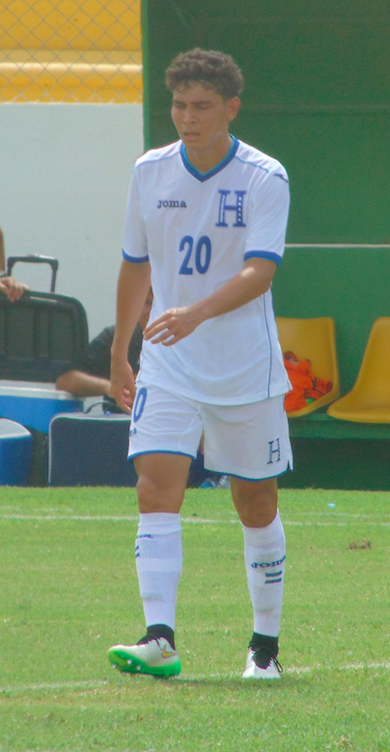
- Benavídez in 2015

Personal information
- Full name: Jhow Hendric Benavídez Banegas
- Date of birth: 26 December 1995 (age 30)
- Place of birth: El Porvenir, Honduras
- Height: 1.78 m (5 ft 10 in)
- Position: Attacking midfielder

Team information
- Current team: Real España
- Number: 10

Senior career*
Years	Team	Apps	(Gls)
2012–	Real España	227	(28)

International career^{‡}
2013–2015	Honduras U20	17	(3)
2016	Honduras U23	11	(0)
2016–	Honduras	7	(0)
Medal record
Men's football
Representing Honduras
CONCACAF Nations League
Bronze medal – third place	2021
- * Club domestic league appearances and goals as of 8 April 2021 ‡ National team caps and goals as of 14 July 2021

Jhow Hendric Benavídez Banegas (born 26 December 1995) is a Honduran professional footballer who plays as an attacking midfielder for Real España. He represented Honduras in the football competition at the 2016 Summer Olympics.

== International career ==
Benavídez got his first call up to the senior Honduras side for a friendly against Belize in October 2016.
