= Samuel Córdova =

Mexican volleyball player (born 1989)

Personal information
- Nationality: Mexican
- Born: 13 March 1989 (age 37)
- Height: 2.00 m (6 ft 7 in)
- Weight: 89 kg (196 lb)
- Spike: 353 cm (139 in)
- Block: 335 cm (132 in)

Volleyball information
- Number: 13

Career
| Years | Teams |
|---|---|
| 2012; 2014 | Tigres UANL (Mexico) Cocoteros de Colima |

National team
| 2014 | Mexico |

Samuel Córdova (born 13 March 1989) is a Mexican male volleyball player. With his club Tigres UANL he competed at the 2012 FIVB Volleyball Men's Club World Championship.
