= Gerson Tinoco =

Honduran-born Guatemalan footballer

Personal information
- Full name: Gerson Betuel Tinoco Carbajal
- Date of birth: 2 November 1988 (age 38)
- Place of birth: Siguatepeque, Honduras
- Height: 1.75 m (5 ft 9 in)
- Position: Forward

Senior career*
Years	Team	Apps	(Gls)
2013–2014	Coatepeque	7	(0)
2015–2016	Cobán Imperial	37	(13)
2016	Comunicaciones	6	(3)
2017	Suchitepéquez	24	(8)
2017-2018	Juticalpa	2	(0)
2018	Petapa	22	(4)
2018-2019	Municipal	15	(1)
2019-2020	Cobán Imperial	45	(5)
2021-2022	Quiché		
2022-2023	Xinabajul	44	(15)
2023-2024	Xelajú	32	(2)

International career^{‡}
2015–2016	Guatemala	15	(5)
- * Club domestic league appearances and goals as of 14 August 2016 ‡ National team caps and goals as of 6 September 2016

Gerson Betuel Tinoco Carbajal (born 2 November 1988) is a Guatemalan footballer who plays as a forward.

== Career statistics ==
As of match played 6 September 2016. Guatemala score listed first, score column indicates score after each Tinoco goal.

International goals by date, venue, cap, opponent, score, result and competition
No.	Date	Venue	Cap	Opponent	Score	Result	Competition
1	8 October 2015	Estadio Tiburcio Carías Andino, Tegucigalpa, Honduras	3	Honduras	1–1	1–1	Friendly
2	17 November 2015	Arnos Vale Stadium, Kingstown, Saint Vincent and the Grenadines	6	Saint Vincent and the Grenadines	4–0	4–0	2018 FIFA World Cup qualification
3	10 February 2016	Estadio Mateo Flores, Guatemala City, Guatemala	7	Honduras	1–1	3–1	Friendly
4	1 June 2016	Lockhart Stadium, Fort Lauderdale, United States	11	Venezuela	1–0	1–1	Friendly
5	6 September 2016	Estadio Mateo Flores, Guatemala City, Guatemala	15	Saint Vincent and the Grenadines	1–1	9–3	2018 FIFA World Cup qualification
