= Edder Delgado =

Honduran footballer (born 1986)

Personal information
- Full name: Edder Gerardo Delgado Zerón
- Date of birth: 20 November 1986 (age 39)
- Place of birth: San Manuel, Honduras
- Height: 1.76 m (5 ft 9 in)
- Position: Midfielder

Team information
- Current team: Real Sociedad
- Number: 23

Senior career*
Years	Team	Apps	(Gls)
2007–2019	Real España	14	(0)
2019-2020	Honduras Progresos	14	(2)
2021	Real de Minas	11	(2)
2021-	Real Sociedad	49	(7)

International career^{‡}
2007–2008	Honduras U-23		
2009–2015	Honduras	34	(0)
- * Club domestic league appearances and goals ‡ National team caps and goals as of 11 June 2014

Edder Gerardo Delgado Zerón (Spanish pronunciation: [ˈeðeɾ ˈðelɣaðo]; born 20 November 1986) is a Honduran international footballer who plays as a midfielder for Real Sociedad in the Honduras National League.

== Club career ==
Nicknamed Camello, Delgado has so far spent his entire professional career at Real Espana, making his debut in September 2007.

He is rumoured to join Seattle Sounders FC after the Sounders sent scouts over to Honduras.

== International career ==
Delgado was part of the Honduras squad at the 2008 Summer Olympics.

He made his senior debut in a June 2009 friendly match against Haiti and has, as of December 2012, earned a total of 18 caps, scoring no goals. He has represented his country in 2 FIFA World Cup qualification matches and played at the 2011 CONCACAF Gold Cup.
