= Wilmer Fuentes =

Honduran football player (born 1992)

Personal information
- Full name: Wilmer Daniel Fuentes Alvarenga
- Date of birth: 21 April 1992 (age 34)
- Place of birth: El Progreso, Honduras
- Height: 1.73 m (5 ft 8 in)
- Position: Defensive midfielder

Youth career
- –2009: Marathón

Senior career*
| Years | Team | Apps | (Gls) |
| 2009–2018 | Marathón | 157 | (2) |
| 2018–2019 | Olancho | | |
| 2019–2021 | Real Sociedad | 35 | (1) |

International career^{‡}
- Honduras U17
- Honduras U20
| 2012–2014 | Honduras | 5 | (0) |
- * Club domestic league appearances and goals as of 1 November 2017 ‡ National team caps and goals as of 21 January 2015

Wilmer Daniel Fuentes Alvarenga (born 21 April 1992) is a Honduran footballer who plays as a midfielder for Platense. He made his debut for Marathon in 2009.

== Early life ==
Fuentes was born on 21 April 1992 to Guermillo Fuentes, father and Antonia Alvarenga, mother and has two more siblings and has a cousin named Milton Josue Arriaga who is a singer and songwriter.

== International career ==
Fuentes played at the 2009 FIFA U-17 World Cup in Nigeria. In 2013, he was included in Honduras' squad for the 2013 CONCACAF Gold Cup. He also participated for Honduras at the 2012 Summer Olympics.

== Honours ==
C.D. Marathón

- Liga Profesional de Honduras: 2009–10 A, 2017–18 C
- Honduran Cup: 2017
