= Justin Arboleda =

Colombian footballer (born 1991)

Yustin Arboleda
Personal information
- Full name: Yustin Arboleda Buenaños
- Date of birth: 18 September 1991 (age 35)
- Place of birth: Barrancas, La Guajira, Colombia
- Height: 1.92 m (6 ft 3 1/2 in)
- Position: Forward

Team information
- Current team: Olimpia
- Number: 19

Senior career*
Years	Team	Apps	(Gls)
2010–2012	Independiente Medellín	15	(0)
2012–2013	Zamora	18	(1)
2013–2015	Chorrillo	51	(15)
2015	Deportivo Pasto	7	(0)
2015–2016	Antigua	4	(0)
2016	Chorrillo	52	(16)
2017–2019	Marathón	98	(60)
2020–	Olimpia	206	(75)

International career^{‡}
2024–	Honduras	5	(0)
- * Club domestic league appearances and goals ‡ National team caps and goals as of 15 November 2024

Yustin Arboleda Buenaños (born 18 September 1991) is a professional footballer who plays as a forward for Liga Nacional club Olimpia. Born in Colombia, he represents the Honduras national team.

== Honours ==
=== Club ===
C.D. Marathón

- Liga Profesional de Honduras: 2017–18 C
- Honduran Cup: 2017
- Honduran Supercup: 2019
