= Roy Smith (footballer, born 1990) =

Costa Rican association football player

Personal information
- Full name: Roy Alexander Smith Lewis
- Date of birth: 19 April 1990 (age 36)
- Place of birth: Puerto Limón, Costa Rica
- Height: 1.84 m (6 ft 0 in)
- Position: Centre-back

Senior career*
| Years | Team | Apps | (Gls) |
| 2007–2011 | Brujas | 53 | (0) |
| 2011 | Orión | 13 | (0) |
| 2012 | Gainare Tottori | 6 | (0) |
| 2013 | The Strongest | 12 | (1) |
| 2013–2014 | CS Uruguay | 27 | (0) |
| 2014–2015 | Santos de Guápiles | 43 | (0) |
| 2016 | Cartaginés | 14 | (0) |
| 2016–2018 | Honduras Progreso | 72 | (4) |
| 2018 | Marathón | 12 | (0) |
| 2019 | Honduras Progreso | 29 | (0) |
| 2020–2021 | Limón | 47 | (1) |

International career
| 2010 | Costa Rica | 2 | (0) |
- * Club domestic league appearances and goals as of 15 July 2021 (UTC)

Roy Alexander Smith Lewis (born 19 April 1990) is a Costa Rican professional footballer who plays as a centre-back.

== Club career ==
Smith started his career at Brujas and had a spell at Orión. He then moved abroad to play for Japanese second division side Gainare Tottori in 2012, where he was joined by compatriot Kenny Cunningham and in January 2013 Bolivian champions The Strongest announced Smith's arrival at the club, with Cunningham again joining him. He scored his first goal for The Strongest in March 2013 against Oriente Petrolero.

He returned to Costa Rica and made his debut for Uruguay in August 2013 against Cartaginés He moved to Santos de Guápiles in summer 2014.

== International career ==
Smith played at the 2007 FIFA U-17 World Cup and in the 2009 FIFA U-20 World Cup, where the Costa Rica national under-20 football team, came 4th after losing to Hungary in the match for the 3rd place.

He made his senior debut for Costa Rica in an October 2010 friendly match against Peru and won his second cap, as of November 2014, a few days later against El Salvador.
