= 2019 Honduran Supercup =

2018 Honduran Supercup
- Event: Honduran Supercup
Platense	Marathón
0	0
- Marathón won 4–2 on penalties
- Date: 24 April 2019
- Referee: Jonfy Vallecillo
- Weather: Partly cloudy

The 2019 Honduran Supercup was a match arranged by the Honduran Liga Nacional and the Honduran Cup which took place on 24 April 2019 between Platense F.C., winners of the 2018 Honduran Cup and C.D. Marathón the winners (with best record) of the 2017–18 Liga Nacional. This was the second official edition of the Honduran Supercup and the 6th overall.

F.C. Motagua were the defending champions.

== Qualified teams ==
Team	Method of qualification	Appearances	Previous best
Platense	Winners of 2018 Honduran Cup	3rd	Runners-up (1997, 1999)
Marathón	Winners of 2017–18 Honduran Liga Nacional (best record)	2nd	Runners-up (2017)

== Background ==
The game was announced on 13 April 2018. C.D. Marathón qualified as winners (with best record) of the 2017–18 Honduran Liga Nacional. Meanwhile, Platense F.C. entered as winners of the 2018 Honduran Cup. Marathón was seeking for revenge as they had lost the previous edition. Meanwhile, Platense qualified to their first Supercup since 1999. They were both looking for their first title. The match was rescheduled from January to April.

== Match ==
24 April 2019	Platense	0–0 (2–4 p)	Marathón	Comayagua
18:00	Starting XI (GK) Zúniga – 1 Bolaños – 3 Matute – 4 Martínez – 5 Nieto – 8 (substituted off) 58' Pineda – 9 (substituted off) 74' Vargas – 12; (substituted off) 58' Moncada – 17; Flores – 21; (substituted off) 87' Mencía – 23; (substituted off) 90+1' Mendoza – 25; Substitutes; (substituted in) 58' Reyes – 11; (substituted in) 58' Winchester – 7 (substituted in) 74' Aguilar – 22; (substituted in) 87' Barahona – 14; (substituted in) 90+1' Rodas – 16; Coach; Caballero (HON)	Report	Starting XI; 25 – Torres (GK); 2 – Bernárdez; 7 – Discua; 8 – Róchez; 9 – Ramírez (substituted off) 56'; 13 – Costly; 15 – Espinoza (substituted off) 61'; 16 – Banegas; 24 – Lahera (substituted off) 82'; 29 – Johnson; 38 – Martínez (substituted off) 56'; Substitutes; 27 – Arboleda (substituted in) 56'; 30 – Solano (substituted in) 56' (substituted off) 88'; 3 – Córdova (substituted in) 61'; 23 – Flores (substituted in) 82'; 10 – Vargas (substituted in) 88'; Coach (ARG) Vargas	Stadium: Estadio Carlos Miranda; Referee: Jonfy Vallecillo
	Penalties
	Nieto (penalty missed); Reyes (penalty missed); Aguilar (penalty scored); Winchester (penalty scored)		(penalty scored) Costly; (penalty scored) Banegas; (penalty scored) Discua; (penalty missed) Vargas; (penalty scored) Arboleda

== See also ==
- 2017–18 Honduran Liga Nacional
- 2018 Honduran Cup
