= Bryan Barrios =

Honduran football player (born 1994)

Personal information
- Full name: Bryan Josué Bernárdez Barrios
- Date of birth: 24 May 1994 (age 32)
- Place of birth: San Pedro Sula, Honduras
- Height: 1.85 m (6 ft 1 in)
- Positions: Centre-back; right-back

Team information
- Current team: Juticalpa

Senior career*
Years	Team	Apps	(Gls)
2014–2015	Parrillas One	7	(0)
2015–2016	Municipal Limeño		
2016–2020	Marathón	93	(1)
2020–2021	Linense	8	(0)
2021–	Vida	0	(0)
- * Club domestic league appearances and goals as of 8 February 2021

Bryan Josué Bernárdez Barrios (born 24 May 1994) is a Honduran footballer who plays as a centre-back or right-back for C.D.S. Vida.

== Club career ==
On 30 June 2020, Spanish Segunda División B side Real Balompédica Linense announced the signing of Barrios on a free transfer after his contract with C.D. Marathón expired. He signed a one-year contract with an option for an additional year depending on performances.

On 23 January 2021, Barrios terminated his contract with Linense, due to personal problems according to Spanish media. Barrios returned to his native Honduras and signed with C.D.S. Vida the following 1 February.
