= Yaudel Lahera =

Cuban footballer

Personal information
- Full name: Yaudel Lahera García
- Date of birth: February 9, 1992 (age 34)
- Place of birth: Havana, Cuba
- Position: Striker

Team information
- Current team: Deportes Savio
- Number: 10

Senior career*
Years	Team	Apps	(Gls)
2010–2012	Ciudad La Habana		
2013–2015	La Habana		
2015–2016	Cimarrones de Sonora		
2016–2017	Tepatitlán de Morelos		
2017–2019	Marathón	71	(15)
2020	Honduras Progreso	13	(1)
2020–2021	Marathón	20	(2)
2021–2022	Victoria	42	(8)
2024–	Deportes Savio		

International career
2011–2012	Cuba	16	(1)
- * Club domestic league appearances and goals as of 17:51, 25 December 2024 (UTC)

Yaudel Lahera García (born 9 February 1992) is a Cuban football striker, who currently plays for the Honduran side Deportes Savio.

== Club career ==
Lahera played for his hometown team La Habana, before fleeing his country during the Central American Games in Veracruz in 2014. He had spells in Mexico before signing a one-year contract with Marathón in July 2017.

== International career ==
He made his international debut for Cuba in a May 2011 friendly match against Nicaragua and has earned a total of 16 caps, scoring 1 goal. He represented his country in 4 FIFA World Cup qualification matches and was part of the squad for the 2011 CONCACAF Gold Cup. He played in three matches.

=== International goals ===
#	Date	Venue	Opponent	Score	Result	Competition
1	28 May 2011	Estadio Pedro Marrero, Havana, Cuba	Nicaragua	2-0	2-1	Friendly match

== Honours and awards ==
=== Club ===
C.D. Marathón

- Liga Profesional de Honduras: 2017–18 C
- Honduran Supercup: 2019
