= Allans Vargas =

Honduran footballer (born 1993)

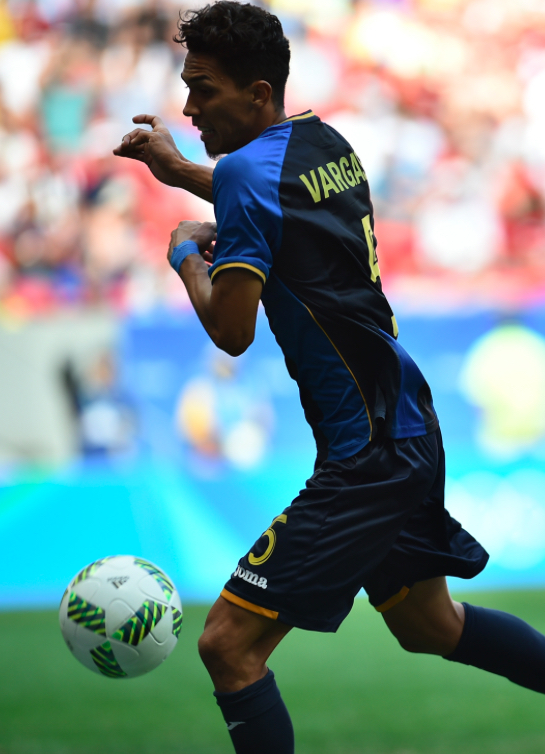
- Vargas with Honduras at the 2016 Summer Olympics

Personal information
- Full name: Allans Josué Vargas Murillo
- Date of birth: 25 September 1993 (age 33)
- Place of birth: San Pedro Sula, Honduras
- Height: 1.84 m (6 ft 1/2 in)
- Position: Defender

Team information
- Current team: Marathón
- Number: 15

Senior career*
Years	Team	Apps	(Gls)
2014–2021	Real España	170	(7)
2021–	Marathón	15	(0)

International career^{‡}
2015–2016	Honduras U23	10	(2)
2016–2022	Honduras	7	(0)
- * Club domestic league appearances and goals as of 13 January 2022 ‡ National team caps and goals as of 13 June 2022

Allans Josué Vargas Murillo (born 25 September 1993) is a Honduran professional footballer who plays for Marathón.

== International career ==
Vargas got his first call up to the senior Honduras side for a friendly against Belize in October 2016.
