= Cristian Cálix =

Honduran footballer (born 1999)

Personal information
- Full name: Cristian Neptalí Cálix Alvarado
- Date of birth: 9 September 1999 (age 27)
- Place of birth: Juticalpa, Olancho, Honduras
- Height: 1.67 m (5 ft 6 in)
- Position: Midfielder

Team information
- Current team: Olancho FC
- Number: 16

Youth career
- 2012–2017: Marathón

Senior career*
Years	Team	Apps	(Gls)
2017–2018	Marathón	31	(3)
2018–2022	Atlas	0	(0)
2019	→ Real Monarchs (loan)	7	(1)
2020–2022	→ Marathón (loan)	41	(4)
2022–	Olancho FC	7	(1)

International career^{‡}
- Honduras U17
2018–2019	Honduras U20	13	(5)
- * Club domestic league appearances and goals as of 21:00, 25 September 2022 (UTC) ‡ National team caps and goals as of 4 June 2021

Cristian Neptalí Cálix Alvarado (born 9 September 1999) is a Honduran professional footballer who plays as a midfielder for Liga Nacional club Olancho FC.

== Club career ==
=== Marathón ===
Born in Juticalpa, Olancho, Cálix is the youngest of five brothers. At the age of 13, he decided to try his luck and pursue a footballing career in San Pedro Sula, where he joined the youth setup of C.D. Marathón. On 29 April 2017, Cálix made his senior debut for Marathón in the Liga Nacional de Fútbol Profesional de Honduras at the age of 17, coming off the bench in a 2–1 home victory over C.D.S. Vida in the Clausura tournament. The following season, Cálix appeared regularly for Marathón, and his first senior goal eventually came on 17 September 2017 in a 3–2 home win against C.D. Olimpia. He would add a further two goals that campaign in matches against Motagua and Honduras Progreso, as his side won the 2018 Clausura tournament.

=== Atlas ===
On 27 December 2018, Atlas F.C. announced the transfer of Cálix from Marathón. He signed a four-year contract with Los Rojinegros, but was assigned to the under-20 team after a delay in his registration. Once he was finally registered, Cálix was included the squad list for the Liga MX match against Club Puebla. He was an unused substitute in a 2–1 home loss. He spent the rest of the season with the U–20 side, playing nine matches and scoring one goal.

==== Loan to Real Monarchs ====
On 9 July 2019, USL Championship side Real Monarchs announced the loan signing of Cálix for the remainder of the season. He made his debut – off the bench – in a 4–1 win against Tulsa Roughnecks FC, replacing Luis Arriaga in the 82nd minute. He scored his first goal the following 17 September in another 4–1 win, this time against Tacoma Defiance away from home. Cálix returned to Atlas after Real Monarchs opted not to trigger the buy-option in his contract.

==== Return to Marathón ====
On 6 January 2020, Cálix returned to C.D. Marathón, signing with the Esmeraldas on a year-long loan. He played the first match of his second spell the following 23 February, coming on as a second-half substitute in a 5–0 away defeat to Olimpia. The following season, Cálix scored the opening goal in a 3–0 home victory against Real España on 14 October 2020.

== International career ==
In July 2018, Cálix was called up to represent his nation at the 2018 Central American and Caribbean Games in Colombia. He played in every match at the tournament and he opened the scoring in the third place match against Haiti, where he helped his side win 3–0 and take home bronze.

The following year, Cálix represented Honduras at the 2019 FIFA U-20 World Cup in Poland. He would only play in two matches, as Honduras were eliminated in the group stage.

In June 2021, he was included in the preliminary 60-man Honduras squad for the 2021 CONCACAF Gold Cup, but was dropped from the final squad.

== Honors ==
Marathón

- Liga Nacional: 2018 Clausura
- Honduran Cup: 2017

Real Monarchs

- USL Championship: 2019
