= Henry Romero (footballer, born 1996) =

Honduran footballer (born 1996)

Personal information
- Full name: Henry Adonis Romero Velásquez
- Date of birth: 12 August 1996 (age 30)
- Place of birth: Tegucigalpa, Honduras
- Position: Forward

Team information
- Current team: Atlético Independiente
- Number: 22

Youth career
- Marathón

Senior career*
Years	Team	Apps	(Gls)
2015–2020	Marathón	46	(8)
2020	Real Sociedad	9	(0)
2021	Platense	19	(4)
2022	Lobos UPNFM	4	(0)
2022	Jocoro	14	(3)
2023–	Atlético Independiente		
- * Club domestic league appearances and goals as of 30 January 2018

Henry Adonis Romero Velásquez (born 12 August 1996) is a Honduran football player who currently plays as a forward for Atlético Independiente in the Honduran Liga Nacional de Ascenso.
