= Domingo Zalazar =

Argentine footballer

Personal information
- Full name: Domingo Omar Zalazar
- Date of birth: 25 October 1986 (age 40)
- Place of birth: Vera, Santa Fe, Argentina
- Height: 1.84 m (6 ft 0 in)
- Position: Striker

Senior career*
Years	Team	Apps	(Gls)
2007	El Porvenir	9	(1)
2007–2009	Defensa y Justicia	15	(2)
2009–2010	Olimpo	27	(7)
2010–2015	Audax Italiano	64	(11)
2012–2014	Audax Italiano B	19	(12)
2015	Unión Comercio	1	(0)
2015–2016	Suchitepéquez	23	(15)
2016	Real España	20	(14)
2017	Atlante	14	(3)
2017–2018	Real España	24	(7)
2018	Municipal	7	(1)
2019	Alvarado	8	(0)
2019–2020	Suchitepéquez	0	(0)

Managerial career
- Metropolitan (assistant)
- 2022: Metropolitan
- 2023: Suchitepéquez (assistant)
- * Club domestic league appearances and goals

Domingo Omar Zalazar (born 10 August 1986) is an Argentine former professional footballer who played as a striker.

== Club career ==
- (Argentina) El Porvenir 2007
- (Argentina) Defensa y Justicia 2007–2009
- (Argentina) Olimpo 2009–2010
- (Chile) Audax Italiano 2010–2015
- (Chile) Audax Italiano B 2012–2014
- (Peru) Unión Comercio 2015
- (Guatemala) Suchitepéquez 2015–2016
- (Honduras) Real España 2016
- (Mexico) Atlante 2017
- (Honduras) Real España 2017–2018
- (Guatemala) Municipal 2018
- (Argentina) Alvarado 2019
- (Guatemala) Suchitepéquez 2019–2020
