= Lobos UPNFM =

Honduran football club

Universidad Pedagógica
- Full name: Club Deportivo Lobos de la Universidad Pedagógica Nacional Francisco Morazán
- Nicknames: La U La Pedagógica; Lobos Universitarios; La Manada; Los Puros Criollos
- Founded: 10 August 2010; 16 years ago
- Ground: Estadio Emilio Williams Agasse; Choluteca, Honduras
- Capacity: 8,000
- Chairman: Hermes Díaz
- Coach: Salomón Nazar
- League: Liga Nacional
- 2019 Apertura: Liga Nacional, 4th (regular season); 4th (postseason)
- Website: http://web.upnfm.edu.hn/lobos/index.php
Home colours	Away colours

Club Deportivo Lobos de la Universidad Pedagógica Nacional Francisco Morazán, more commonly known as Universidad Pedagógica or Lobos UPNFM is a Honduran football club, based in Tegucigalpa, Honduras.

The club currently plays in the Honduran Liga Nacional.

== History ==
The club was founded on August 10, 2010, as a sports club for the university. Coincidentally, that same year a place opened up in the Liga Nacional de Ascenso. Until that year, major Honduran teams had fielded affiliates that competed in the Liga de Ascenso. A reform in the league structure forced the withdrawal of those teams, and allowed UPNFM to move into the spot. The club's roster was drawn from students at the university; here too, however, the withdrawal of the affiliated clubs worked in their favor. UPNFM was an attractive loan partner for reserve players at Olimpia and Motagua because they could pursue a university degree while playing.

On 4 June 2017, the club claimed their first title by winning the Clausura of the 2016–17 Liga Nacional de Ascenso. Seven days later, they defeated Lepaera F.C. to earn promotion to the 2017–18 Honduran Liga Nacional franchise.

UPNFM finished 6th in the Apertura and 8th in the Clausura, finishing comfortably clear of relegation and earning a second season of top flight football.

== Achievements ==
- Liga de Ascenso

Winners (1): 2016–17 C
Runners-up (1): 2014–15 A

== Performance by year ==
Regular season			Postseason		Others		
Season	Finish	Record	Finish	Record	Cup	Supercup	International
2017–18 A	6th	7–3–8 (22:28)	Playoffs	0–1–1 (2:4)	Not held	Didn't enter	
2017–18 C	8th	5–3–10 (18:27)	Didn't enter		Not held	Didn't enter	
2018–19 A	3rd	9–3–6 (25:20)	Playoffs	0–1–1 (1:2)	Quarter-finalist	Didn't enter	
2018–19 C	5th	6–9–3 (22:16)	Semi-finals	2–0–2 (7:9)	Quarter-finalist	Didn't enter	

== Other teams ==
International tournaments from Lobos UPNFM excluding the men's football team.

Tournament	Finish
2017 CONCACAF Futsal Club Championship	Group stage
2017 UNCAF Women's Interclub Championship	4th

== Current squad ==
As of 12 April, 2026

Note: Flags indicate national team as defined under FIFA eligibility rules; some limited exceptions apply. Players may hold more than one non-FIFA nationality.

No.	Pos.	Nation	Player
1	GK	HON	Celio Valladares
2	DF	COL	Luis López
3	DF	HON	Geremy Rodas
4	DF	HON	José García
5	DF	HON	Aarón Zúñiga
6	MF	HON	Justin Ponce
7	FW	HON	Carlos Róchez
8	MF	HON	Jonathan Núñez
9	FW	HON	Jairo Róchez
10	MF	CHI	Marcos Morales
11	FW	PAR	Roberto Moreira (captain)
12	GK	HON	Alex Güity
13	DF	HON	Cristian Gutiérrez

No.	Pos.	Nation	Player
16	DF	HON	Enrique Vásquez
17	MF	HON	Jesús Padilla
20	DF	HON	Eliu López
21	MF	HON	Elmer Güity
22	DF	HON	Cristopher Ardón
23	FW	HON	Samir Dolmo
26	DF	HON	Jonathan Banzzety
27	FW	HON	Kilmar Peña
30	FW	HON	Leonardo Herrlein
32	FW	HON	Juan Martínez
46	FW	HON	Janiel Martínez
55	GK	HON	Daniel Lagos

== Former managers ==
- (Honduras) Salomón Nazar 2010–2012
- (Honduras) Donaldo Cáceres 2012
- (Honduras) Nahúm Espinoza 2012
- (Honduras) Arnold Cruz 2013
- (Honduras) Eduardo Bennett 2013
- (Honduras) Arnold Cruz 2014
- (Honduras) José de la Paz Herrera 2014–2015
- (Honduras) Raúl Martínez Sambulá 2015–2016
- (Honduras) Salomón Nazar 2017–2021
- (Honduras) Raúl Cáceres 2021–2022
- (Honduras) Héctor Castellón 2022–2023
- (Honduras) Ramón Maradiaga 2023–2024
- (Honduras) Orlando López 2024–2025
- (Honduras) Salomón Nazar 2025–
