= 2019–20 C.D. Marathón season =

Marathón
2019–20 season
- Chairman: Orinson Amaya
- Manager: Héctor Vargas
- Stadium: Estadio Yankel Rosenthal
- Apertura: TBA
- Clausura: TBA
- Cup: TBA
- Supercup: TBA
- CONCACAF League: Preliminary Round
- Top goalscorer: League: Carlo Costly (8); All: Carlo Costly; Justin Arboleda(8)
Home colours
- All statistics correct as of 4 March 2019.

The 2019–20 season will be C.D. Marathón's 69th season in existence and the club's 54rd consecutive season in the top fight of Honduran football. The club will fight for its 10th league title, facing also the 2019 Honduran Cup, the 2019 Honduran Supercup, and the 2019 CONCACAF League.

== Overview ==
Héctor Vargas remains as the manager; he has been in charge since the 2017–18 season.

== Apertura ==
=== Transfers in ===
Player	Contract date	Moving from	Position
(Honduras) Frelys López	5 June 2019	Honduras Progreso	FW
(Panama) Azmahar Ariano	15 June 2019	(Panama) Tauro	DF
(Honduras) Mario Martínez	24 June 2019	(Honduras) Real España	MF
(Argentina) Esteban Espíndola	28 June 2019	(Argentina) Racing de Córdoba	DF
(Colombia) Yerson Gutiérrez	28 June 2019	Honduras Progreso	FW
(Honduras) Noé Enamorado	13 July 2019	(Honduras) San Juan	DF
(Honduras) Roberto López	16 July 2019	(Honduras) Real España	GK
(Honduras) Kervin Arriaga	23 July 2019	(Honduras) Platense	MF

=== Transfers out ===
Player	Released date	Moving to	Position
(Cuba) Yaudel Lahera	22 May 2019	TBA	FW/MF
(Brazil) Caue Fernandes	24 May 2019	TBA	DF
(Honduras) John Bodden	5 June 2019	(Honduras) Victoria	GK
(Honduras) Joshua Vargas	17 June 2019	TBA	MF/FW
(Honduras) Samuel Córdova	28 June 2019	(Honduras) Lobos UPNFM	DF

=== Loans out ===
Player	Loan date	Moving to	Position
(Honduras) Marlon Ramírez	18 June 2019	Honduras Progreso	FW
(Honduras) Darvis Argueta	18 June 2019	Honduras Progreso	FW
(Honduras) Víctor Aráuz	18 June 2019	Honduras Progreso	DF
(Honduras) Samuel Lucas	18 June 2019	Honduras Progreso	DF/MF

=== Standings ===
Pos	Team	Pld	W	D	L	GF	GA	GD	Pts	Qualification or relegation
1	Olimpia	18	14	2	2	37	12	+25	44	Advance to Pentagonal and Final
2	Marathón	18	12	4	2	39	17	+22	40	Advance to Pentagonal
3	Motagua	18	9	4	5	26	21	+5	31	Advance to Pentagonal
4	UPNFM	18	7	5	6	24	23	+1	26	Advance to Pentagonal
5	Vida	18	7	4	7	24	24	0	25	Advance to Pentagonal

Updated to match(es) played on 20 November 2019. Source: Soccerway
Rules for classification: 1) points; 2) goal difference; 3) number of goals scored.

=== Matches ===
==== Results by round ====
Round	1	2	3	4	5	6	7	8	9	10	11	12	13	14	15	16
Ground	H	A	H	H	A	H	A	A	H	H	A	H	H	A	H	
Result	W	W	D	W	W	W	L	W	W	D	W	W	D	W	W	

A = Away; H = Home; W = Win; D = Draw; L = Loss

==== Regular season ====
27 July 2019 Round 1	Marathón	2 – 0	Real de Minas	San Pedro Sula, Cortés
15:00	Costly 20'; Martínez 73'	Report		Stadium: Estadio Yankel Rosenthal; Referee: Jonfy Vallecillo

4 August 2019 Round 2	Vida	0 – 2	Marathón	La Ceiba, Atlántida
18:00		Report	Costly 10'; Gutiérrez 66'	Stadium: Estadio Nilmo Edwards

11 August 2019 Round 3	Marathón	1 – 1	Olimpia	San Pedro Sula, Cortés
16:00	Espíndola 47'	Report	Lacayo 46'	Stadium: Estadio Olímpico Metropolitano; Attendance: 12,000; Referee: Óscar Moncada

14 August 2019 Round 4	Marathón	4 – 1	Honduras Progreso	San Pedro Sula, Cortés
15:30	Discua 45'; Arboleda 45+3'; Costly 58'; López 68'	Report	Britto 90+2'	Stadium: Estadio Yankel Rosenthal; Referee: Héctor Rodríguez

17 August 2019 Round 5	Lobos UPNFM	0 – 1	Marathón	Choluteca, Choluteca
19:00		Report	Discua 58'	Stadium: Estadio Emilio Williams Agasse

24 August 2019 Round 6	Marathón	3 – 1	Real España	San Pedro Sula, Cortés
15:30	Arboleda 18'; Solano 63'; Gutiérrez 84'	Report	Benavidez 40'	Stadium: Estadio Olímpico Metropolitano

1 September 2019 Round 7	Motagua	1 – 0	Marathón	Juticalpa, Olancho
16:00	Crisanto 9'	Report		Stadium: Estadio Juan Ramón Brevé Vargas; Referee: Raúl Castro

11 September 2019 Round 8	Real Sociedad	2 – 5	Marathón	Olanchito, Yoro
19:00	Abbott 38'; Melgares 41' (pen.)	Report	López 18', 32'; Flores 37'; Martínez 45+3'; Costly 63'	Stadium: Estadio Municipal San Jorge

12 October 2019 Round 9	Marathón	3 – 2	Platense	San Pedro Sula, Cortés
15:00	Costly 5', 9'; Discua 17'	Report	Volpi 50'; Barahona 70'	Stadium: Estadio Yankel Rosenthal; Referee: David Cruz

18 September 2019 Round 10	Marathón	0 – 0	Real Sociedad	San Pedro Sula, Cortés
15:30		Report		Stadium: Estadio Yankel Rosenthal; Referee: David Cruz

22 September 2019 Round 11	Platense	0 – 4	Marathón	Puerto Cortés, Cortés
16:00		Report	Arboleda 45' (pen.); Róchez 51'; Gutiérrez 75'; López 82'	Stadium: Estadio Excélsior; Referee: Luis Mejía

28 September 2019 Round 12	Marathón	2 – 1	Motagua	San Pedro Sula, Cortés
16:00	Martínez 6'; Arriaga 85'	Report	Gálvaliz 21'	Stadium: Estadio Olímpico Metropolitano; Referee: Melvin Matamoros

5 October 2019 Round 13	Marathón	4 – 4	Lobos UPNFM	San Pedro Sula, Cortés
15:00	Arboleda 15' (pen.), 58'; Martínez 18'; Costly 75' (pen.)	Report	Pinto 11'; Güity 62'; Peña 69'; Ariano 90+3' (o.g.)	Stadium: Estadio Yankel Rosenthal; Referee: Jonfy Vallecillo

16 October 2019 Round 14	Real de Minas	0 – 1	Marathón	Danlí, El Paraíso
15:30		Report	Arboleda 34' (pen.)	Stadium: Estadio Marcelo Tinoco; Referee: Melissa Borjas Pastrana

20 October 2019 Round 15	Real España	2 – 4	Marathón	San Pedro Sula, Cortés
17:00	García 4'; Martínez 23'	Report	Arboleda 41'; Arriaga 45+3'; Solano 66'; Costly 81'	Stadium: Estadio Olímpico Metropolitano; Referee: Óscar Moncada

== CONCACAF League ==
=== Preliminary Round ===
1 August 2019 First leg	Comunicaciones (Guatemala)	2–1	(Honduras) Marathón	Guatemala City, Guatemala
20:00	Gordillo 47'; Vargas 54'	Report	5' Solano	Stadium: Estadio Doroteo Guamuch Flores; Referee: (Jamaica) Oshane Nation

8 August 2019 Second leg	Marathón (Honduras)	1–1 (2–3 agg.)	(Guatemala) Comunicaciones	San Pedro Sula, Honduras
20:00	Arboleda 80'	Report	89' Hernández	Stadium: Estadio Olímpico Metropolitano; Attendance: 8,000; Referee: (El Salvador) Ismael Cornejo

Comunicaciones won 3–2 on aggregate.
