= 2018–19 in Honduran football =

Football in Honduras
- Season: 2018–19

Men's football
- Liga Nacional: Apertura: Motagua; Clausura: Motagua
- Liga de Ascenso: Apertura: Real Sociedad; Clausura: Olancho
- Honduran Cup: Platense
- Honduran Supercup: Marathón

The 2018–19 season is the 71st season of competitive association football in Honduras.

== National teams ==
=== Senior team ===
==== CONCACAF Gold Cup ====
| Pos | Team | Pld | W | D | L | GF | GA | GD | Pts | Qualification |
|---|---|---|---|---|---|---|---|---|---|---|
| 1 | Jamaica (H) | 3 | 1 | 2 | 0 | 4 | 3 | +1 | 5 | Advance to knockout stage |
| 2 | Curaçao | 3 | 1 | 1 | 1 | 2 | 2 | 0 | 4 | Advance to knockout stage |
| 3 | El Salvador | 3 | 1 | 1 | 1 | 1 | 4 | −3 | 4 | |
| 4 | Honduras | 3 | 1 | 0 | 2 | 6 | 4 | +2 | 3 | |

Source: CONCACAF
Rules for classification: Tiebreakers
(H) Hosts

=== Olympic team ===
==== Central American and Caribbean Games ====
| Pos | Team | Pld | W | D | L | GF | GA | GD | Pts | Qualification |
|---|---|---|---|---|---|---|---|---|---|---|
| 1 | Colombia (H) | 3 | 2 | 1 | 0 | 7 | 2 | +5 | 7 | Advance to knockout stage |
| 2 | Honduras | 3 | 2 | 1 | 0 | 5 | 2 | +3 | 7 | Advance to knockout stage |
| 3 | Costa Rica | 3 | 1 | 0 | 2 | 4 | 5 | −1 | 3 | |
| 4 | Trinidad and Tobago | 3 | 0 | 0 | 3 | 3 | 10 | −7 | 0 | |

Source: BAQ2018
Rules for classification: Tie-breakers
(H) Hosts

Semi-finals
28 July — Barranquilla (Romelio Martínez)
Colombia | 3
Haiti | 1
28 July — Barranquilla (Romelio Martínez)
Venezuela | 1
Honduras | 0

Gold medal match
31 July — Barranquilla (Romelio Martínez)
Colombia | 2
Venezuela | 1
Bronze medal match
31 July — Barranquilla (Romelio Martínez)
Haiti | 0
Honduras | 3

=== U-20 team ===
==== 2018 UNCAF U-19 Tournament ====
| Pos | Team | Pld | W | D | L | GF | GA | GD | Pts |
|---|---|---|---|---|---|---|---|---|---|
| 1 | Guatemala | 6 | 5 | 1 | 0 | 9 | 1 | +8 | 16 |
| 2 | Panama | 6 | 5 | 0 | 1 | 15 | 6 | +9 | 15 |
| 3 | Costa Rica | 6 | 3 | 2 | 1 | 16 | 7 | +9 | 11 |
| 4 | Honduras (H) | 6 | 2 | 1 | 3 | 11 | 11 | 0 | 7 |
| 5 | Nicaragua | 6 | 1 | 1 | 4 | 7 | 10 | −3 | 4 |
| 6 | El Salvador | 6 | 1 | 1 | 4 | 5 | 15 | −10 | 4 |
| 7 | Belize | 6 | 1 | 0 | 5 | 4 | 17 | −13 | 3 |

Rules for classification: 1) Points; 2) Goal difference; 3) Number of goals scored;
(H) Hosts

=== U-17 team ===
==== 2018 UNCAF U-16 Tournament ====
| Pos | Team | Pld | W | D | L | GF | GA | GD | Pts | Qualification |
|---|---|---|---|---|---|---|---|---|---|---|
| 1 | Panama | 6 | 5 | 0 | 1 | 8 | 2 | +6 | 15 | Winners |
| 2 | Costa Rica | 6 | 4 | 2 | 0 | 12 | 3 | +9 | 14 | |
| 3 | Guatemala | 6 | 2 | 3 | 1 | 7 | 2 | +5 | 9 | |
| 4 | Nicaragua | 6 | 2 | 2 | 2 | 6 | 6 | 0 | 8 | |
| 5 | Honduras | 6 | 2 | 1 | 3 | 13 | 10 | +3 | 7 | |
| 6 | Belize | 6 | 1 | 0 | 5 | 3 | 19 | −16 | 3 | |
| 7 | El Salvador | 6 | 0 | 2 | 4 | 3 | 10 | −7 | 2 | |

Updated to match(es) played on 27 October 2018. Source:
Rules for classification: 1) Points; 2) Goal difference; 3) Goals scored.

== Domestic clubs ==
=== Promotion and relegation ===
| League | Promoted to league | Relegated from league |
|---|---|---|
| Liga Nacional | TBD | TBD |
| Liga de Ascenso | TBD | TBD |

=== Summer transfers ===
| Date | Name | Moving from | Moving to | Ref. |
|---|---|---|---|---|
| 9 May 2018 | (Honduras) Jairo Puerto | Puerto Rico FC | (Honduras) Real España | |
| 11 May 2018 | (Honduras) Wilfredo Barahona | (Honduras) Real España | (Honduras) Juticalpa | |
| 2 June 2018 | (Argentina) Domingo Zalazar | (Honduras) Real España | (Guatemala) Municipal | |
| 3 June 2018 | (Uruguay) Maximiliano Callorda | (Uruguay) Boston River | (Honduras) Real España | |
| 5 June 2018 | (Honduras) Johnny Leverón | (Honduras) Marathón | (Honduras) Real España | |
| 7 June 2018 | (Honduras) Alfredo Mejía | (Greece) Xanthi | (Honduras) Real España | |
| 13 June 2018 | (Honduras) Carlos Sánchez | Honduras Progreso | (Honduras) Motagua | |
| 23 June 2018 | (Honduras) Marlon Ramírez | (Egypt) ENPPI | (Honduras) Marathón | |
| 23 June 2018 | (Honduras) Juan Rodríguez | (Honduras) Marathón | TBD | |
| 27 June 2018 | (Argentina) Matías Galvaliz | (Argentina) Defensores de Belgrano | (Honduras) Motagua | |
| 28 June 2018 | (Paraguay) Roberto Moreira | (Argentina) Ferro Carril Oeste | (Honduras) Motagua | |
| 28 June 2018 | (Honduras) Carlos Discua | (Honduras) Motagua | (Honduras) Marathón | |
| 28 June 2018 | (Honduras) Sony Fernández | (Honduras) Vida | (Honduras) UPNFM | |
| 28 June 2018 | (Honduras) Leonardo Benedith | (Honduras) Vida | (Honduras) UPNFM | |
| 28 June 2018 | (Honduras) Joel López | (Honduras) Vida | (Honduras) Villanueva | |
| 2 July 2018 | (Honduras) Darwin Arita | (Honduras) UPNFM | (Honduras) Real España | |
| 4 July 2018 | (Honduras) Irvin Reyna | Honduras Progreso | (Honduras) Real de Minas | |
| 4 July 2018 | (Brazil) Israel Silva | (Honduras) Marathón | (Honduras) Real de Minas | |
| 4 July 2018 | (Brazil) Mateus Ferreira | – | (Honduras) Real de Minas | |
| 4 July 2018 | (Panama) Brunet Hay | (Honduras) Platense | TBD | |
| 4 July 2018 | (Honduras) Donaldo Morales | (Honduras) Platense | (Honduras) Real de Minas | |
| 4 July 2018 | (Honduras) Erick Norales | (Honduras) Platense | TBD | |
| 4 July 2018 | (Honduras) Ian Osorio | (Honduras) Platense | (Honduras) UPNFM | |
| 10 July 2018 | (Brazil) Leandro Motta | (Brazil) Democrata | (Honduras) Olimpia | |
| 11 July 2018 | (Honduras) Denilson Castillo | (Honduras) Motagua | (Honduras) Real España | |
| 11 July 2018 | (Honduras) Christian Altamirano | (Honduras) Real España | Honduras Progreso | |
| 17 July 2018 | (Honduras) José Mendoza | (Honduras) Juticalpa | (Honduras) Platense | |
| 18 July 2018 | (Honduras) Devron García | (Honduras) Real España | (Honduras) Vida | |
| 18 July 2018 | (Honduras) Clinton Arzú | (Honduras) Real España | Honduras Progreso | |
| 18 July 2018 | (Honduras) Robbie Matute | (Honduras) Real Sociedad | (Honduras) Platense | |
| 18 July 2018 | (Honduras) Níxon Duarte | (Honduras) Juticalpa | (Honduras) Platense | |
| 19 July 2018 | (Honduras) Julio de León | (Honduras) Parrillas One | (Honduras) Platense | |

=== Winter transfers ===
| Date | Name | Moving from | Moving to | Ref. |
|---|---|---|---|---|
| 18 November 2018 | (Honduras) Maylor Núñez | (Honduras) Juticalpa | (Honduras) Olimpia | |
| 13 December 2018 | (Honduras) José Tobías | Honduras Progreso | (Honduras) Real España | |
| 13 December 2018 | (Honduras) Odis Borjas | (Honduras) Real España | TBD | |
| 17 December 2018 | (Honduras) Luis López | (United States) Orange County | (Honduras) Real España | |
| 22 December 2018 | (Honduras) Hendry Thomas | (Honduras) Olimpia | TBD | |
| 23 December 2018 | (Honduras) Esteban Espíndola | (Honduras) Olimpia | TBD | |
| 25 December 2018 | (Honduras) Pedro Mencía | Honduras Progreso | (Honduras) Platense | |
| 25 December 2018 | (Trinidad and Tobago) André Ettiene | Honduras Progreso | TBD | |
| 25 December 2018 | (Honduras) Mariano Acevedo | Honduras Progreso | TBD | |
| 25 December 2018 | (Mexico) Justin Pérez | Honduras Progreso | TBD | |
| 25 December 2018 | (Colombia) Luís González | Honduras Progreso | TBD | |
| 25 December 2018 | (Grenada) Jamal Charles | (United States) Real Monarchs | (Honduras) Vida | |
| 25 December 2018 | (Honduras) Mauro Reyes | Honduras Progreso | TBD | |
| 25 December 2018 | (Honduras) Michael Osorio | (Honduras) Vida | (Honduras) UPNFM | |
| 25 December 2018 | (Honduras) Javier Quiñones | (Honduras) Vida | TBD | |
| 25 December 2018 | (Costa Rica) Roy Smith | (Honduras) Marathón | TBD | |
| 25 December 2018 | (Honduras) Níxon Duarte | (Honduras) Platense | TBD | |
| 25 December 2018 | (Trinidad and Tobago) Jerrel Britto | (Honduras) Platense | TBD | |
| 25 December 2018 | (Honduras) Cristhian Altamirano | (Honduras) Platense | TBD | |
| 25 December 2018 | (Honduras) Luis Lobo | (Honduras) Platense | TBD | |
| 25 December 2018 | (Honduras) Jorge Cardona | (Honduras) Platense | Honduras Progreso | |
| 25 December 2018 | (Honduras) Brayan Reyes | (Honduras) Platense | TBD | |
| 28 December 2018 | (Honduras) Cristian Cálix | (Honduras) Marathón | (Mexico) Atlas | |
| 28 December 2018 | (Honduras) Henry Figueroa | (Honduras) Motagua | (Costa Rica) Alajuelense | |
| 29 December 2018 | (Colombia) Luís Castro | (Honduras) Platense | (Honduras) Real Juventud | |
| 29 December 2018 | (Argentina) Emiliano Bonfigli | (Ecuador) Cuenca | (Honduras) Olimpia | |
| 30 December 2018 | (Honduras) Diego Reyes | (Honduras) Olimpia | (Honduras) Platense | |
| 31 December 2018 | (Honduras) Mayron Flores | (Honduras) Olimpia | (Honduras) Marathón | |
| 31 December 2018 | (Honduras) Raúl Cáceres | – | (Honduras) Real de Minas | |
| 31 December 2018 | (Honduras) Josué Villafranca | (Honduras) Motagua | (Honduras) Real de Minas | |
| 31 December 2018 | (Honduras) Dílmer Gutiérrez | (Honduras) UPNFM | (Honduras) Vida | |
| 31 December 2018 | (Honduras) José Pineda | (Honduras) UPNFM | (Honduras) Juticalpa | |
| 31 December 2018 | (Honduras) Leonardo Benedit | (Honduras) UPNFM | TBD | |
| 31 December 2018 | (Honduras) Christian Martínez | (Honduras) UPNFM | TBD | |
| 31 December 2018 | (Honduras) José Pinto | (Honduras) UPNFM | (Honduras) Olimpia | |
| 31 December 2018 | (Honduras) Jorge Álvarez | (Honduras) UPNFM | (Honduras) Olimpia | |
| 31 December 2018 | (Honduras) Jorge Benguché | (Honduras) UPNFM | (Honduras) Olimpia | |
| 31 December 2018 | (Honduras) Bayron Méndez | (Honduras) Parrillas One | (Honduras) Juticalpa | |
| 31 December 2018 | (Honduras) Franco Güity | (Honduras) Juticalpa | (Honduras) UPNFM | |
| 31 December 2018 | (Honduras) Jorge Zaldívar | (Honduras) Juticalpa | TBD | |
| 31 December 2018 | (Honduras) José Fonseca | (Honduras) Juticalpa | TBD | |
| 31 December 2018 | (Honduras) Víctor Moncada | (Honduras) Juticalpa | (Honduras) UPNFM | |
| 31 December 2018 | (Honduras) Brayan García | (Honduras) Juticalpa | (Honduras) Real España | |
| 31 December 2018 | (Honduras) Osman Melgares | (Honduras) Juticalpa | TBD | |
| 31 December 2018 | (Honduras) Allan Catalán | – | Honduras Progreso | |
| 31 December 2018 | (Honduras) Álvaro Romero | – | Honduras Progreso | |
| 31 December 2018 | (Honduras) César Oseguera | (Honduras) Real España | (Honduras) Platense | |
| 31 December 2018 | (Colombia) Andrés Pineda | – | (Honduras) Platense | |
| 31 December 2018 | (Honduras) José Mendoza | (Honduras) Platense | (Honduras) UPNFM | |
| 31 December 2018 | (Honduras) Émerson Lalín | (Honduras) Platense | TBD | |
| 31 December 2018 | (Honduras) Arnaldo Urbina | (Honduras) Vida | TBD | |
| 31 December 2018 | (Honduras) Patrick Palacios | Reserves | (Honduras) Real España | |
| 31 December 2018 | (Honduras) José Arévalo | (Honduras) Real España | TBD | |
| 1 January 2019 | (Honduras) Wilmer Fuentes | (Honduras) Marathón | (Honduras) Platense | |
| 2 January 2019 | (Honduras) Marcelo Espinal | (Honduras) Vida | (Honduras) Juticalpa | |
| 3 January 2019 | (Honduras) Harold Fonseca | (Honduras) Motagua | (Honduras) Vida | |
| 3 January 2019 | (Honduras) Eddie Hernández | (Iran) Zob Ahan Esfahan | (Honduras) Vida | |
| 4 January 2019 | (Uruguay) Martín Bonjour | (Uruguay) Torque | (Honduras) Olimpia | |
| 5 January 2019 | (Argentina) Guillermo Chavasco | (Ecuador) Técnico Universitario | (Honduras) Olimpia | |
| 5 January 2019 | (Brazil) Caue Fernandes | Free agent | (Honduras) Marathón | |
| 6 January 2019 | (Honduras) Óscar Salas | (Honduras) Olimpia | (Honduras) Juticalpa | |
| 6 January 2019 | (Honduras) Román Castillo | (Honduras) Motagua | (China) Nantong Zhiyun | |
| 7 January 2019 | (Honduras) Brayan Velásquez | (Honduras) Olimpia | (Venezuela) Zulia | |
| 7 January 2019 | (Uruguay) Emiliano Techera | (Uruguay) Atenas | (Honduras) Juticalpa | |
| 8 January 2019 | (Honduras) Marcelo Canales | (Honduras) Olimpia | TBD | |
| 9 January 2019 | (Honduras) José García | (Honduras) Olimpia | (Honduras) Real de Minas | |
| 9 January 2019 | (Honduras) Carlos Pineda | (Honduras) Olimpia | (Honduras) Real de Minas | |
| 9 January 2019 | (Honduras) Kevin Hernández | (Honduras) Real España | (Honduras) Platense | |
| 9 January 2019 | (Honduras) José Escalante | (United States) San Antonio | (Honduras) Juticalpa | |
| 10 January 2019 | (Honduras) Rony Martínez | (Honduras) Olimpia | (Honduras) Real España | |
| 10 January 2019 | (Honduras) Jairo Róchez | (Honduras) Olimpia | (Honduras) UPNFM | |
| 10 January 2019 | (Honduras) Carlo Costly | (Honduras) Olimpia | (Honduras) Marathón | |
| 10 January 2019 | (Colombia) Javier Estupiñán | (Honduras) Motagua | (Honduras) Juticalpa | |

=== Liga Nacional ===
Quarterfinals
3 | UPNFM | 1 | 0 | 1
6 | Platense | 1 | 1 | 2
4 | Marathón | 0 | 3 | 3
5 | Real España | 2 | 2 | 4

Semifinals
1 | Motagua | 1 | 3 | 4
4 | Platense | 0 | 1 | 1
2 | Olimpia | 2 | 0 | 2
3 | Real España | 2 | 0 | 2

Finals
1 | Motagua | 2 | 0 | 2
2 | Olimpia | 0 | 1 | 1

Quarterfinals
4 | Real España | 1 | 1 | 2
5 | UPNFM | 3 | 2 | 5
3 | Motagua | 0 | 3 | 3
6 | Platense | 0 | 0 | 0

Semifinals
1 | Olimpia | 3 | 4 | 7
5 | UPNFM | 1 | 1 | 2
2 | Marathón | 0 | 2 | 2
3 | Motagua | 2 | 2 | 4

Finals
1 | Olimpia | 2 | 0 | 2
3 | Motagua | 2 | 1 | 3

=== CONCACAF Champions League ===
Round of 16
(Guatemala) Guastatoya | 0 | 1 | 1
(United States) Houston Dynamo | 1 | 2 | 3
(Costa Rica) Saprissa | 1 | 1 | 2
(Mexico) UANL | 0 | 5 | 5
(Dominican Republic) Atlético Pantoja | 0 | 0 | 0
(United States) New York Red Bulls | 2 | 3 | 5
(Honduras) Marathón | 2 | 0 | 2
(Mexico) Santos Laguna | 6 | 5 | 11
(El Salvador) Alianza | 0 | 0 | 0
(Mexico) Monterrey | 0 | 1 | 1
(Costa Rica) Herediano | 3 | 0 | 3
(United States) Atlanta United FC | 1 | 4 | 5
(Panama) Independiente | 4 | 1 | 5
(Canada) Toronto FC | 0 | 1 | 1
(United States) Sporting Kansas City | 3 | 2 | 5
(Mexico) Toluca | 0 | 0 | 0

Quarter-finals
(United States) Houston Dynamo | 0 | 0 | 0
(Mexico) UANL | 2 | 1 | 3
(United States) New York Red Bulls | 0 | 2 | 2
(Mexico) Santos Laguna | 2 | 4 | 6
(Mexico) Monterrey | 3 | 0 | 3
(United States) Atlanta United FC | 0 | 1 | 1
(Panama) Independiente | 2 | 0 | 2
(United States) Sporting Kansas City | 1 | 3 | 4

Semi-finals
(Mexico) UANL | 3 | 2 | 5
(Mexico) Santos Laguna | 0 | 3 | 3
(Mexico) Monterrey | 5 | 5 | 10
(United States) Sporting Kansas City | 0 | 2 | 2

Final
(Mexico) UANL | 0 | 1 | 1
(Mexico) Monterrey | 1 | 1 | 2

=== CONCACAF League ===
Round of 16
(Costa Rica) Herediano (a) | 1 | 1 | 2
(El Salvador) Santa Tecla | 0 | 2 | 2
(Nicaragua) Diriangén | 0 | 1 | 1
(Panama) Universitario | 4 | 3 | 7
(El Salvador) FAS | 2 | 1 | 3
(Costa Rica) Pérez Zeledón | 1 | 1 | 2
(Panama) Árabe Unido | 3 | 1 | 4
(Jamaica) Arnett Gardens | 0 | 2 | 2
(Panama) Tauro | 1 | 1 | 2
(Honduras) Real España | 0 | 1 | 1
(Martinique) Club Franciscain | 1 | 0 | 1 (1)
(Nicaragua) Walter Ferretti (p) | 0 | 1 | 1 (4)
(Honduras) Motagua | 2 | 1 | 3
(Belize) Belmopan Bandits | 0 | 0 | 0
(Costa Rica) Santos de Guápiles | 1 | 2 | 3 (6)
(Jamaica) Portmore United (p) | 2 | 1 | 3 (7)

Quarter-finals
(Costa Rica) Herediano | 3 | 2 | 5
(Panama) Universitario | 0 | 1 | 1
(El Salvador) FAS | 0 | 1 | 1
(Panama) Árabe Unido | 1 | 3 | 4
(Panama) Tauro | 3 | 4 | 7
(Nicaragua) Walter Ferretti | 1 | 0 | 1
(Honduras) Motagua | 3 | 2 | 5
(Jamaica) Portmore United | 2 | 0 | 2

Semi-finals
(Costa Rica) Herediano | 2 | 0 | 2
(Panama) Árabe Unido | 0 | 1 | 1
(Panama) Tauro | 2 | 0 | 2
(Honduras) Motagua | 1 | 2 | 3

Final
(Costa Rica) Herediano | 2 | 1 | 3
(Honduras) Motagua | 0 | 2 | 2

=== Other matches ===
| 6 July 2018 Friendly | Olimpia | 2–3 | UPNFM | Siguatepeque |
| | Bengtson; Moya (pen.) | | 68' Peña; 84' Vásquez; Meléndez | Stadium: Estadio Roberto Martínez Ávila |

| 7 July 2018 Friendly | Comayagua | 0–3 | Olimpia | Siguatepeque |
| | | | Álvarez; Moya; Canales | Stadium: Estadio Roberto Martínez Ávila |

| 7 July 2018 Friendly | Honduras Progreso | 1–2 | Real España | El Progreso |
| | Valencia | | Martínez; Tejeda | Stadium: Estadio Humberto Micheletti |

| 13 July 2018 Friendly | Olimpia (Honduras) | 2–0 | (Costa Rica) Alajuelense | San Pedro Sula, Honduras |
| 19:00 | Bengtson 45'; Álvarez 80' | | | Stadium: Estadio General Francisco Morazán; Referee: Héctor Rodríguez (HON) |

| 14 July 2018 Friendly | Municipal (Guatemala) | 2–1 | (Honduras) Real España | Guatemala City, Guatemala |
| 15:00 | López 15'; Hansen 33' | | 27' Benavídez | Stadium: Estadio El Trébol |

| 14 July 2018 Friendly | UPNFM | v | Broncos del Sur | Choluteca |
| 16:00 | | | | Stadium: Estadio Emilio Williams Agasse |

| 14 July 2018 Friendly | Cobán Imperial (Guatemala) | v | (Honduras) Platense | Cobán, Guatemala |
| 16:00 | | | | Stadium: Estadio Verapaz |

| 14 July 2018 Friendly | UPNFM (Honduras) | v | (El Salvador) Jocoro | Choluteca, Honduras |
| 18:00 | | | | Stadium: Estadio Emilio Williams Agasse |

| 15 July 2018 Friendly | Real de Minas (Honduras) | 4–1 | (El Salvador) Jocoro | Danlí, Honduras |
| 16:00 | | | | Stadium: Estadio Marcelo Tinoco |

| 15 July 2018 Friendly | Motagua (Honduras) | 2–2 (2–4 p) | (Costa Rica) Alajuelense | Tegucigalpa, Honduras |
| 16:00 | Vega 9'; Montes 55' | | 14' A. López; 80' Moya | Stadium: Estadio Tiburcio Carías Andino; Referee: Saíd Martínez (HON) |
| | Penalties |
| | Galvaliz (penalty scored); Andino (penalty missed); López (penalty missed); Estupiñán (penalty scored) | | (penalty scored) McDonald; (penalty missed) Moya; (penalty scored) Álvarez; (penalty scored) Guevara; (penalty scored) P. López |
Note: 2018 Copa Diunsa

| 15 July 2018 Friendly | Honduras Progreso | 0–2 | Marathón | El Progreso |
| 17:00 | | | Romero; Argueta | Stadium: Estadio Humberto Micheletti |

| 16 September 2018 Friendly | New Orleans (United States) | 1–2 | (Honduras) Olimpia | New Orleans, United States |

== Deaths ==
| Date | Name | Born | Notes |
|---|---|---|---|
| 3 November 2018 | (Honduras) Guillermo Suazo | – | Former C.D. Atlético Español and C.D. Verdún footballer. Cancer. |
| 5 November 2018 | (Brazil) Geraldo da Silva | – | Former F.C. Motagua footballer. Brain cancer. |
| 16 November 2018 | (Honduras) Gil Rodríguez | – | Former Real C.D. España footballer. Heart attack. |
| 18 November 2018 | (Honduras) Óscar Munguía | 6 July 1991 (aged 27) | Active C.D.S. Vida footballer. Multiple gunshots. |
| 11 December 2018 | (Honduras) José Williams | 30 September 1983 (aged 35) | Honduran defender. Stroke. |
| 12 December 2018 | (Honduras) José Ferrari | 10 February 1937 (aged 81) | Club Deportivo Olimpia's president. Heart attack. |
| 28 December 2018 | (Honduras) Edwin Pavón | 6 November 1962 (aged 56) | Former Honduras national football team manager. Cardiac arrest. |
| 12 January 2019 | (Honduras) René Suazo | 1934 or 1935 (aged 84) | Former Club Deportivo Olimpia footballer. Heart attack. |
| 28 April 2019 | (Honduras) Carlos Suazo | 8 March 1936 (aged 83) | Former footballer and manager. Respiratory failure. |
| 11 June 2019 | (Honduras) Roberto Bailey | 10 August 1952 (aged 66) | Former Honduras national football team player. Car accident. |
