= 2018–19 Liga Nacional de Honduras =

Liga Nacional de Honduras
- Season: 2018–19
- Dates: 28 July 2018–May 2019
- Champions: Apertura: Motagua; Clausura: Motagua
- Relegated: Juticalpa
- CONCACAF League: Motagua; Olimpia; Marathón
- Matches: 203
- Goals: 530 (2.61 per match)
- Top goalscorer: Bengtson (24)
- Biggest home win: MAR 6–0 HNP (17 April 2019)
- Biggest away win: HNP 2–6 RES (7 October 2018)
- Highest scoring: HNP 2–6 RES (7 October 2018)
- Longest unbeaten run: OLI (15)
- Longest losing run: RDM (6)
- All statistics correct as of 2 June 2019.

The 2018–19 Liga Nacional de Honduras season was the 53rd edition of the Liga Nacional de Honduras, the top football league in Honduras, since its establishment in 1965. The tournament started in July 2018 and ended in June 2019. The season was divided into two halves (Apertura and Clausura), each crowning one champion. F.C. Motagua as winners of both tournaments, qualified to the 2019 CONCACAF League as HON1. Club Deportivo Olimpia as runner-ups and C.D. Marathón as the team with the third best record, also qualified to international contention for next season.

== 2018–19 teams ==
Location of teams in 2018–19 season

A total of 10 teams will contest the tournament, including 9 sides from the 2017–18 season plus C.D. Real de Minas, promoted from the 2017–18 Liga de Ascenso.

Team	Location	Stadium	Capacity
Honduras Progreso	El Progreso	Estadio Humberto Micheletti	5,000
Juticalpa	Juticalpa	Estadio Juan Ramón Brevé Vargas	20,000
Marathón	San Pedro Sula	Estadio Yankel Rosenthal	15,000
Motagua	Tegucigalpa	Estadio Tiburcio Carías Andino	35,000
Olimpia	Tegucigalpa	Estadio Tiburcio Carías Andino	35,000
Platense	Puerto Cortés	Estadio Excélsior	7,910
Real de Minas	Tegucigalpa	Estadio Tiburcio Carías Andino	35,000
Real España	San Pedro Sula	Estadio Francisco Morazán	26,781
UPNFM	Tegucigalpa	Estadio Tiburcio Carías Andino	35,000
Vida	La Ceiba	Estadio Nilmo Edwards	18,000

- Real de Minas changed its name from Infop RNP to Club Deportivo Real de Minas.
- C.D. Real de Minas will use Danlí and Siguatepeque as alternate venues.
- Lobos UPNFM will use Choluteca as alternate venue.
- Club Deportivo Olimpia used San Pedro Sula as alternate venue for one game.

== Managerial changes ==
Team	Outgoing manager	Manner of departure	Vacancy	Replaced by	Appointment	Position in table
Juticalpa	(Honduras) Ramón Maradiaga	Banned	2 May 2018	(Honduras) Héctor Castellón	1 June 2018	Preseason
Real de Minas	(Honduras) Reynaldo Tilguath	Replaced	26 July 2018	(Honduras) Javier Padilla	26 July 2018	Preseason
Real de Minas	(Honduras) Javier Padilla	Resigned	20 October 2018	(Colombia) Harold Yepes	22 October 2018	10th
Olimpia	(Honduras) Nahúm Espinoza	Resigned	24 October 2018	(Uruguay) Manuel Keosseián	25 October 2018	1st
Real de Minas	(Colombia) Harold Yepes	Sacked	10 November 2018	(Honduras) Raúl Cáceres	5 December 2018	10th
Honduras Progreso	(Honduras) Mauro Reyes	Sacked	10 November 2018	(Honduras) Hernán García	16 December 2018	7th
Real España	(Uruguay) Martín García	Resigned	1 December 2018	(Colombia) Carlos Restrepo	17 December 2018	5th
Juticalpa	(Honduras) Héctor Castellón	Sacked	5 December 2018	(Uruguay) Robert Lima	10 December 2018	9th
Vida	(Honduras) Raúl Martínez	Sacked	17 February 2019	(Honduras) Héctor Castellón	17 February 2019	8th
Honduras Progreso	(Honduras) Hernán García	Resigned	18 February 2019	(Honduras) Reynaldo Clavasquín	18 February 2019	7th
Juticalpa	(Uruguay) Robert Lima	Sacked	18 February 2019	(Honduras) Wilmer Cruz	19 February 2019	9th
Platense	(Honduras) Carlos Martínez	Resigned	7 April 2019	(Honduras) Carlos Caballero	8 April 2019	6th
Honduras Progreso	(Honduras) Reynaldo Clavasquín	Resigned	11 April 2019	(Honduras) Luís Alvarado	12 April 2019	9th
Platense	(Honduras) Carlos Caballero	Sacked	8 May 2019	(Panama) José Torres	16 May 2019	Play-offs

== Apertura ==
The Apertura tournament was the first half of the 2018–19 season which run from 28 July to 16 December 2018. The schedule of the Apertura was released on 13 July. F.C. Motagua finished at the top of the standings for their first time since 2010. Meanwhile, Lobos UPNFM reached their best regular season performance finishing third. C.D. Real de Minas finished last in their first league appearance. Club Deportivo Olimpia eliminated Real C.D. España and qualified to their first final series since 2016. Motagua, their rivals on the other side, qualified to their fifth consecutive final. With a 2–1 aggregate score, Motagua conquered their 16th national title.

=== Regular season ===
==== Standings ====
Pos	Team	Pld	W	D	L	GF	GA	GD	Pts	Qualification or relegation
1	Motagua	18	11	4	3	28	11	+17	37	Advance to Playoffs (Semifinals)
2	Olimpia	18	8	8	2	25	17	+8	32	Advance to Playoffs (Semifinals)
3	UPNFM	18	9	3	6	25	20	+5	30	Advance to Playoffs (Quarterfinals)
4	Marathón	18	7	7	4	28	22	+6	28	Advance to Playoffs (Quarterfinals)
5	Real España	18	7	5	6	31	25	+6	26	Advance to Playoffs (Quarterfinals)
6	Platense	18	6	6	6	21	18	+3	24	Advance to Playoffs (Quarterfinals)
7	Honduras Progreso	18	6	4	8	27	31	−4	22	
8	Vida	18	4	7	7	21	24	−3	19	
9	Juticalpa	18	3	6	9	19	34	−15	15	
10	Real de Minas	18	3	2	13	15	38	−23	11	

Source: Soccerway
Rules for classification: 1) points; 2) goal difference; 3) number of goals scored.

==== Results ====
Home \ Away	HNP	JUT	MAR	MOT	OLI	PLA	RDM	RES	UPN	VID
Honduras Progreso	—	1–0	2–3	2–0	1–1	1–2	0–1	2–6	2–1	1–1
Juticalpa	0–0	—	0–3 (Note: Match awarded to C.D. Marathón with a 3–0 score as a result of Juticalpa F.C. fielding the ineligible player Carlos Palacios. The match originally ended 1–1.)	1–2	2–2	1–1	3–2	1–1	0–1	3–1
Marathón	3–1	4–3	—	1–1	1–1	1–1	3–1	2–2	2–1	0–0
Motagua	2–0	5–0	1–0	—	0–1	1–0	6–1	1–0	1–0	1–0
Olimpia	2–2	1–1	2–1	1–1	—	2–1	2–0	2–1	1–0	0–0 (Note: At Estadio General Francisco Morazán.)
Platense	2–3	0–0	1–0	1–0	0–0	—	4–1	2–1	0–0	2–2
Real de Minas	0–2	1–2	3–1	0–0	1–3	0–3	—	1–0	0–1	0–2
Real España	3–2	2–1	1–1	1–1	1–3	1–0	2–1	—	1–2	3–0
UPNFM	3–1	4–1	1–1	1–3	2–1	2–1	2–0	1–3	—	1–1
Vida	1–4	3–0	0–1	1–2	2–0	2–0	2–2	2–2	1–2	—

Updated to match(es) played on 11 November 2018. Source: Soccerway
Legend: Blue = home team win; Yellow = draw; Red = away team win.
For upcoming matches, an "a" indicates there is an article about the rivalry between the two participants.

=== Playoffs ===
==== Results ====
Quarterfinals
3	UPNFM	1	0	1
6	Platense	1	1	2
4	Marathón	0	3	3
5	Real España	2	2	4

Semifinals
1	Motagua	1	3	4
4	Platense	0	1	1
2	Olimpia	2	0	2
3	Real España	2	0	2

Finals
1	Motagua	2	0	2
2	Olimpia	0	1	1

14 November 2018 Quarterfinals	Platense	1–1	UPNFM	Puerto Cortés
19:15	Nieto 84' (pen.) Starting XI (GK) Zúniga – 1 Bolaños – 3 Matute – 4 Lobo – 9 (substituted off) 46' Álvarez – 10; Vargas – 12; Flores – 21; Aguilar – 22; (substituted off) 67' Rodas –24; Mendoza – 25; Arriaga – 33; Substitutes; (substituted on) 46' Fajardo – 13; (substituted on) 67' Nieto – 8 Coach; Martínez (HON)	Report	39' (pen.) Benguché Starting XI; 1 – Valladares (GK); 6 – Reyes; 9 – Benguché (substituted off) 86'; 14 – Castillo; 15 – Urmeneta; 16 – Montoya; 21 – Peña (substituted off) 61'; 23 – Álvarez; 26 – Osorio; 27 – Pinto (substituted off) 46'; 29 – Fernández; Substitutes; 8 – Cálix (substituted on) 46'; 11 – Meléndez (substituted on) 61'; 17 – Gutiérrez (substituted on) 86'; Coach (HON) Nazar	Stadium: Estadio Excélsior; Attendance: 1,531; Referee: Erick Andino

17 November 2018 Quarterfinals	UPNFM	0–1 (1–2 agg.)	Platense	Choluteca
19:00	Starting XI (GK) Valladares – 1 Reyes – 6 Benguché – 9 Castillo – 14; Urmeneta – 15; Montoya – 16; Gutiérrez – 17; (substituted off) 51' Peña – 21; Álvarez – 23; (substituted off) 66' Osorio – 26; (substituted off) 59' Pinto – 27; Substitutes; (substituted on) 51' Meléndez – 11; (substituted on) 59' Cálix – 11; (substituted on) 66' Padilla – 10; Coach; Nazar (HON)	Report	6' Winchester Starting XI; 1 – Zúniga (GK); 3 – Bolaños; 4 – Matute; 7 – Winchester (substituted off) 76'; 8 – Nieto; 12 – Vargas; 21 – Flores; 22 – Aguilar (substituted off) 89'; 24 – Rodas (substituted off) 58'; 25 – Mendoza; 33 – Arriaga; Substitutes; 14 – Reyes (substituted on) 58'; 17 – Britto (substituted on) 76'; 2 – Castro (substituted on) 89'; Coach (HON) Martínez	Stadium: Estadio Emilio Williams Agasse; Attendance: 2,387; Referee: Héctor Rodríguez

14 November 2018 Quarterfinals	Real España	2–0	Marathón	San Pedro Sula
19:00	Benavídez 34' (pen.); Vuelto 78' (pen.) Starting XI (GK) R. López – 12; Montes – 2 Puerto – 6 Martínez – 10; Vargas – 15; Leverón – 16; (substituted off) 85' Claros – 17; Vuelto – 18; I. López – 19; Delgado – 23; (substituted off) 60' Benavídez – 38; Substitutes; (substituted on) 60' Arita – 20; (substituted on) 85' Quiroz – 45 Coach; García (URU)	Report	(penalty missed) Arboleda Starting XI; 25 – Torres (GK); 2 – Bernárdez; 3 – Córdova; 7 – Discua; 8 – Róchez (substituted off) 81'; 9 – Ramírez (substituted off) 57'; 16 – Banegas; 21 – Smith; 27 – Arboleda; 29 – Johnson; 38 – Martínez (substituted off) 57'; Substitutes – Vargas (substituted on) 57'; 24 – Lahera (substituted on) 57'; 22 – Romero (substituted on) 81'; Coach (ARG) Vargas	Stadium: Estadio General Francisco Morazán; Attendance: 3,979; Referee: Nelson Salgado

17 November 2018 Quarterfinals	Marathón	3–2 (3–4 agg.)	Real España	San Pedro Sula
15:00	Arboleda 3' 36'; Discua 65' Starting XI (GK) Torres – 25; Bernárdez – 2 (substituted off) 34' Córdova – 3 Discua – 7 (substituted off) 62' Ramírez – 9 (substituted off) 57' Espinoza – 15; Lahera – 24; Arboleda – 27; Johnson – 29; Solano – 30; Martínez – 38; Substitutes; (substituted on) 34' Smith – 21; (substituted on) 57' Róchez – 8 (substituted on) 62' Vargas – Coach; Vargas (ARG)	Report	39' Tejeda; 52' Oseguera Starting XI; 12 – R. López (GK); 2 – Montes; 6 – Puerto (substituted off) 69'; 10 – Martínez (substituted off) 81'; 13 – Tejeda; 15 – Vargas (yellow card) 67' (yellow-red card) 85'; 17 – Claros; 18 – Vuelto (substituted off) 90+5'; 19 – I. López; 23 – Delgado; 28 – Oseguera; Substitutes; 4 – Velásquez (substituted on) 69'; 45 – Quiroz (substituted on) 81'; 49 – Martínez (substituted on) 90+5'; Coach (URU) García	Stadium: Estadio Yankel Rosenthal; Attendance: 2,989; Referee: Melvin Matamoros

25 November 2018 Semifinals	Platense	0–1	Motagua	Puerto Cortés
16:00	Starting XI (GK) Zúniga – 1 Bolaños – 3 Matute – 4 Winchester – 7 (substituted off) 47' Vargas – 12; (substituted off) 60' Reyes – 14; Flores – 21; Aguilar – 22; (substituted off) 56' Rodas – 24; Mendoza – 25; Arriaga – 33; Substitutes; (substituted on) 47' Altamirano – 11; (substituted on) 56' Fajardo – 13; (substituted on) 60' Benítez – 30; Coach; Martínez (HON)	Report	49' López Starting XI; 19 – Rougier (GK); 2 – Montes; 6 – Mayorquín (substituted off) 85'; 8 – Martínez; 9 – Castillo (substituted off) 86'; 12 – Santos; 16 – Castellanos; 17 – Maldonado; 21 – Moreira; 24 – Elvir; 34 – López (substituted off) 83'; Substitutes; 7 – Andino (substituted on) 83'; 4 – Peña (substituted on) 85'; 22 – Estupiñán (substituted on) 86'; Coach (ARG) Vásquez	Stadium: Estadio Excélsior; Attendance: 4,398; Referee: Melvin Matamoros

2 December 2018 Semifinals	Motagua	3–1 (4–1 agg.)	Platense	Tegucigalpa
16:00	López 30'; Maldonado 48'; Crisanto 84' Starting XI (GK) Rougier – 19; Montes – 2 Mayorquín – 6 (substituted off) 75' Castillo – 9 (substituted off) 66' Galvaliz – 10; Santos – 12; (substituted off) 46' Castellanos – 16; Maldonado – 17; Moreira – 21; Elvir – 24; López – 34; Substitutes; (substituted on) 46' Peña – 4 (substituted on) 66' Martínez – 8 (substituted on) 75' Crisanto – 18; Coach; Vásquez (ARG)	Report	76' Castro Starting XI; 1 – Zúniga (GK); 3 – Bolaños; 4 – Matute; 7 – Winchester; 8 – Nieto; 17 – Britto; 21 – Flores (substituted off) 46'; 22 – Aguilar; 25 – Mendoza; 30 – Benítez (substituted off) 57'; 33 – Arriaga; Substitutes; 2 – Castro (substituted on) 46'; 12 – Vargas (substituted on) 57' Coach (HON) Martínez	Stadium: Estadio Tiburcio Carías Andino; Attendance: 13,784; Referee: Saíd Martínez

24 November 2018 Semifinals	Real España	2–2	Olimpia	San Pedro Sula
19:00	Tejeda 11'; Vuelto 55' Starting XI (GK) R. López – 12; Montes – 2 Puerto – 6 Mejía – 8 (substituted off) 82' Martínez – 10; Tejeda – 13; Leverón – 16; (substituted off) 77' Vuelto – 18; I. López – 19; Oseguera – 28; Benavídez – 38; Substitutes; (substituted on) 77' Delgado – 23; (substituted on) 82' Guevara – 37 Coach; García (URU)	Report	50' Velásquez; 59' Álvarez Starting XI; 1 – Menjívar (GK); 2 – Álvarez; 5 – Alvarado; 7 – C. Mejía (substituted off) 82'; 9 – D. Reyes (substituted off) 87'; 17 – Paz; 20 – Flores; 21 – Espíndola; 23 – Velásquez (substituted off) 76'; 27 – Bengtson; 31 – Thomas; Substitutes; 24 – J. Reyes (substituted on) 76'; 14 – Lacayo (substituted on) 82'; 29 – G. Mejía (substituted on) 87'; Coach (URU) Keosseián	Stadium: Estadio Olímpico Metropolitano; Attendance: 10,541; Referee: Héctor Rodríguez

1 December 2018 Semifinals	Olimpia	0–0 (2–2 agg.)	Real España	Tegucigalpa
19:00	Starting XI (GK) Menjívar – 1 Álvarez – 2 Alvarado – 5 C. Mejía – 7 (substituted off) 74' D. Reyes – 9 Paz – 17; Flores – 20; Espíndola – 21; (substituted off) 74' Velásquez – 23; (substituted off) 90' Bengtson – 27; Thomas – 31; Substitutes; (substituted on) 74' Lacayo – 14; (substituted on) 74' J. Reyes – 24; (substituted on) 90' G. Mejía – 29; Coach; Keosseián (URU)	Report	Starting XI; 12 – R. López (GK); 2 – Montes; 6 – Puerto; 10 – Martínez; 13 – Tejeda; 15 – Vargas; 18 – Vuelto; 19 – I. López; 23 – Delgado (substituted off) 66'; 28 – Oseguera; 38 – Benavídez (substituted off) 84'; Substitutes; 17 – Claros (substituted on) 66'; 8 – Mejía (substituted on) 84' Coach (URU) García	Stadium: Estadio Tiburcio Carías Andino; Attendance: 22,383; Referee: Armando Castro

9 December 2018 Final	Olimpia	0–2	Motagua	Tegucigalpa
16:00	Starting XI (GK) Menjívar – 1 Álvarez – 2 Alvarado – 5 Castillo – 6 (substituted off) 57' Martínez – 12; (yellow card) 31' (yellow-red card) 32' Paz – 17; Flores – 20; Espíndola – 21; Reyes – 24; (substituted off) 84' Bengtson – 27; (substituted off) 75' Thomas – 31; Substitutes; (substituted on) 57' C. Mejía – 7 (substituted on) 75' G. Mejía – 29; (substituted on) 84' Costly – 13; Coach; Keosseián (URU)	Report	64' Castillo; 71' Moreira Starting XI; 19 – Rougier (GK); 2 – Montes; 6 – Mayorquín (substituted off) 62'; 9 – Castillo; 10 – Galvaliz (substituted off) 77'; 12 – Santos; 16 – Castellanos (substituted off) 83'; 17 – Maldonado; 21 – Moreira; 24 – Elvir; 34 – López; Substitutes; 8 – Martínez (substituted on) 62'; 4 – Peña (substituted on) 77'; 5 – Pereira (substituted on) 83'; Coach (ARG) Vásquez	Stadium: Estadio Tiburcio Carías Andino; Attendance: 23,350; Referee: Héctor Rodríguez

16 December 2018 Final	Motagua	0–1 (2–1 agg.)	Olimpia	Tegucigalpa
16:00	Starting XI (GK) Rougier – 19; Montes – 2 (substituted off) 74' Mayorquín – 6 Castillo – 9 (substituted off) 64' Galvaliz – 10; Santos – 12; Castellanos – 16; Maldonado – 17; Moreira – 21; Elvir – 24; (substituted off) 87' López – 34; Substitutes; (substituted on) 64' Martínez – 8 (substituted on) 74' Peña – 4 (substituted on) 87' Andino – 7 Coach; Vásquez (ARG)	Report	78' (o.g.) Montes Starting XI; 1 – Menjívar (GK); 2 – Álvarez; 3 – Güity; 5 – Alvarado (substituted off) 61'; 7 – C. Mejía (substituted off) 46'; 13 – Costly; 17 – Paz; 20 – Flores; 21 – Espíndola; 27 – Bengtson; 29 – G. Mejía (substituted off) 72'; Substitutes; 26 – Salas (substituted on) 46'; 14 – Lacayo (substituted on) 61'; 9 – Reyes (substituted on) 72'; Coach (URU) Keosseián	Stadium: Estadio Tiburcio Carías Andino; Attendance: 22,701; Referee: Melvin Matamoros

== Clausura ==
The Clausura tournament was the second half of the 2018–19 season which ran from January to June 2019. The schedule was released on 20 December 2018. Club Deportivo Olimpia finished on top of the standings for the first time since 2017. Lobos UPNFM made history in the play-offs stage after beating Real C.D. España and qualifying to their first ever semifinal. Just as it happened in the Apertura tournament, F.C. Motagua defeated their city rivals in the final series and conquered their 17th national title.

=== Regular season ===
==== Standings ====
Pos	Team	Pld	W	D	L	GF	GA	GD	Pts	Qualification or relegation
1	Olimpia	18	11	4	3	31	13	+18	37	Advance to Playoffs (Semifinals)
2	Marathón	18	10	4	4	32	24	+8	34	Advance to Playoffs (Semifinals)
3	Motagua	18	9	4	5	29	15	+14	31	Advance to Playoffs (Quarterfinals)
4	Real España	18	7	7	4	19	15	+4	28	Advance to Playoffs (Quarterfinals)
5	UPNFM	18	6	9	3	22	16	+6	27	Advance to Playoffs (Quarterfinals)
6	Platense	18	7	4	7	25	20	+5	25	Advance to Playoffs (Quarterfinals)
7	Real de Minas	18	4	8	6	21	22	−1	20	
8	Juticalpa	18	2	10	6	20	33	−13	16	
9	Vida	18	2	7	9	14	29	−15	13	
10	Honduras Progreso	18	2	3	13	11	37	−26	9	

Source: Soccerway
Rules for classification: 1) points; 2) goal difference; 3) number of goals scored.

==== Results ====
Home \ Away	HNP	JUT	MAR	MOT	OLI	PLA	RDM	RES	UPN	VID
Honduras Progreso	—	1–1	0–1	0–1	1–2	1–4	0–0	1–2	1–0	2–0
Juticalpa	2–2	—	1–1	2–3	0–4	2–0	3–3	1–2	0–0	1–1
Marathón	6–0	1–2	—	1–0	1–0	2–1	2–1	2–2	3–1	4–3
Motagua	4–0	4–0	5–1	—	1–1	0–1	0–2	1–0	3–0	1–1
Olimpia	2–1	4–0	3–0	0–0	—	2–1	1–1	0–0	1–2	4–0
Platense	2–0	1–1	2–3	2–1	1–2	—	3–1	4–0	0–1	1–1
Real de Minas	3–0	1–1	0–2	0–2	1–3	0–0	—	1–1	0–0	3–0
Real España	2–0	0–0	1–1	3–1	0–1	0–1	2–0	—	1–1	1–0
UPNFM	3–0	4–2	0–0	1–1	3–0	2–0	2–2	0–0	—	1–1
Vida	2–1	1–1	2–1	0–1	0–1	1–1	0–2	0–2	1–1	—

Updated to match(es) played on 27 April 2019. Source: Soccerway
Legend: Blue = home team win; Yellow = draw; Red = away team win.
For upcoming matches, an "a" indicates there is an article about the rivalry between the two participants.

=== Playoffs ===
==== Results ====
Quarterfinals
4	Real España	1	1	2
5	UPNFM	3	2	5
3	Motagua	0	3	3
6	Platense	0	0	0

Semifinals
1	Olimpia	3	4	7
5	UPNFM	1	1	2
2	Marathón	0	2	2
3	Motagua	2	2	4

Finals
1	Olimpia	2	0	2
3	Motagua	2	1	3

1 May 2019 Quarterfinals	Platense	0–0	Motagua	Puerto Cortés
16:00	Starting XI (GK) Zúniga – 1 Bolaños – 3 Matute – 4 Martínez – 5 Winchester – 7 (substituted off) 25' Nieto – 8 (substituted off) 73' Reyes – 11; Vargas – 12; Flores – 21; (substituted off) 68' Aguilar – 22; Arriaga – 33; Substitutes; (substituted on) 25' Mendoza – 25; (substituted on) 68' Mencía – 23; (substituted on) 73' Fajardo – 13; Coach; Caballero (HON)	Report	Starting XI; 19 – Rougier (GK); 2 – Montes; 4 – Peña; 5 – Pereira; 10 – Galvaliz (substituted off) 85'; 11 – Vega (substituted off) 90+3'; 16 – Castellanos; 17 – Maldonado; 21 – Moreira; 24 – Elvir; 34 – López (substituted off) 65'; Substitutes; 18 – Crisanto (substituted on) 65'; 31 – Sánchez (substituted on) 85'; 6 – Mayorquín (substituted on) 90+3'; Coach (ARG) Vásquez	Stadium: Estadio Excélsior; Referee: Erick Andino

5 May 2019 Quarterfinals	Motagua	3–0 (3–0 agg.)	Platense	Tegucigalpa
16:00	Moreira 26' (pen.) 44' 50' Starting XI (GK) Rougier – 19; Montes – 2 Peña – 4 Pereira – 5 (substituted off) 74' Galvaliz – 10; (substituted off) 82' Castellanos – 16; Maldonado – 17; Moreira – 21; (substituted off) 46' Estigarribia – 22; Elvir – 24; López – 34; Substitutes; (substituted on) 46' Vega – 11; (substituted on) 74' Crisanto – 18; (substituted on) 82' Martínez – 8 Coach; Vásquez (ARG)	Report	Starting XI; 1 – Zúniga (GK); 3 – Bolaños (red card) 75'; 4 – Matute; 5 – Martínez; 7 – Winchester; 9 – Pineda (substituted off) 46'; 12 – Vargas; 21 – Flores; 22 – Aguilar (substituted off) 46'; 25 – Mendoza; 33 – Arriaga; Substitutes; 11 – Reyes (substituted on) 46'; 23 – Mencía (substituted on) 46' Coach (HON) Caballero	Stadium: Estadio Tiburcio Carías Andino; Referee: Raúl Castro

1 May 2019 Quarterfinals	UPNFM	3–1	Real España	Choluteca
15:00	Róchez 38'; Meléndez 40'; Güity 60' Starting XI (GK) Valladares – 1 Reyes – 6 (substituted off) 71' Róchez – 9 (substituted off) 29' Castillo – 14; Urmeneta – 15; Montoya – 16; Sauceda – 20; (substituted off) 57' Peña – 21; Osorio – 26; Fernández – 29; Vásquez – 50; Substitutes; (substituted on) 29' Meléndez – 11; (substituted on) 57' Güity – 77; (substituted on) 71' Padilla – 10; Coach; Nazar (HON)	Report	23' Puerto Starting XI; 22 – L. López (GK); 2 – Montes; 5 – Flores (substituted off) 46'; 6 – Puerto (substituted off) 64'; 8 – Mejía; 10 – M. Martínez (substituted off) 64'; 11 – R. Martínez; 15 – Vargas; 18 – Vuelto; 20 – Tobías; 23 – Delgado; Substitutes; 38 – Benavídez (substituted on) 46'; 13 – Tejeda (substituted on) 64'; 19 – I. López (substituted on) 64'; Coach (COL) Restrepo	Stadium: Estadio Emilio Williams Agasse; Referee: Nelson Salgado

5 May 2019 Quarterfinals	Real España	1–2 (2–5 agg.)	UPNFM	San Pedro Sula
18:00	López 41' Starting XI (GK) L. López – 22; Montes – 2 (substituted off) 52' M. Martínez – 10; R. Martínez – 11; García – 14; Vargas – 15; (substituted off) 64' Claros – 17; Vuelto – 18; I. López – 19; Tobías – 20; Benavídez – 38; Substitutes; (substituted on) 52' Puerto – 6 (substituted on) 64' Tejeda – 13; Coach; Restrepo (COL)	Report	35' Peña; 76' (pen.) Meléndez Starting XI; 1 – Valladares (GK); 6 – Reyes; 9 – Róchez (substituted off) 62'; 14 – Castillo; 15 – Urmeneta; 16 – Montoya; 20 – Sauceda; 21 – Peña (substituted off) 53'; 26 – Osorio; 29 – Fernández; 50 – Vásquez; Substitutes; 77 – Güity (substituted on) 53'; 11 – Meléndez (substituted on) 62'; Coach (HON) Nazar	Stadium: Estadio General Francisco Morazán; Referee: Óscar Moncada

11 May 2019 Semifinals	UPNFM	1–3	Olimpia	Choluteca
15:00	Meléndez 63' Starting XI (GK) Valladares – 1 Reyes – 6 Róchez – 9 (substituted off) 34' Castillo – 14; (substituted off) 60' Urmeneta – 15; Montoya – 16; Sauceda – 20; (substituted off) 45' Peña – 21; Osorio – 26; Fernández – 29; Vásquez – 50; Substitutes; (substituted on) 34' Meléndez – 11; (substituted on) 45' Güity – 77; (substituted on) 60' Moncada – 24; Coach; Nazar (HON)	Report	11' 57' 72' Benguché Starting XI; 1 – Menjívar (GK); 3 – Güity; 5 – Alvarado; 9 – Benguché (substituted off) 84'; 10 – Sosa (substituted off) 64'; 17 – Paz; 20 – Flores; 23 – Álvarez; 24 – Reyes (substituted off) 75'; 26 – Núñez; 27 – Bengtson; Substitutes; 29 – Mejía (substituted on) 64'; 12 – Chavasco (substituted on) 75'; 14 – Lacayo (substituted on) 84'; Coach (URU) Keosseián	Stadium: Estadio Emilio Williams Agasse; Referee: Melissa Borjas

19 May 2019 Semifinals	Olimpia	4–1 (7–2 agg.)	UPNFM	Tegucigalpa
16:00	Flores 9'; Benguché 37' 70'; Alvarado 67' Starting XI (GK) Menjívar – 1 Güity – 3 Alvarado – 5 (substituted off) 76' Benguché – 9 (substituted off) 85' Sosa – 10; Paz – 17; Flores – 20; Álvarez – 23; (substituted off) 55' Reyes – 24; Núñez – 26; Bengtson – 27; Substitutes; (substituted on) 55' Chavasco – 12; (substituted on) 76' Lacayo – 14; (substituted on) 85' Mejía – 7 Coach; Keosseián (URU)	Report	62' Urmeneta Starting XI; 1 – Mendoza (GK); 4 – Medina; 7 – Fiallos; 8 – Cálix; 9 – Róchez; 10 – Padilla (substituted off) 70'; 13 – Yáñez; 15 – Urmeneta; 21 – Peña (substituted off) 46'; 22 – Osorio; 24 – Moncada (substituted off) 46'; Substitutes; 77 – Güity (substituted on) 46'; 16 – Montoya (substituted on) 46'; 11 – Meléndez (substituted on) 70'; Coach (HON) Nazar	Stadium: Estadio Tiburcio Carías Andino; Referee: Armando Castro

12 May 2019 Semifinals	Motagua	2–0	Marathón	Tegucigalpa
16:00	Galvaliz 9'; López 64' Starting XI (GK) Rougier – 19; Montes – 2 Peña – 4 (substituted off) 84' Galvaliz – 10; (red card) 46' Castellanos – 16; Maldonado – 17; Moreira – 21; (substituted off) 82' Estigarribia – 22; Elvir – 24; (substituted off) 80' López – 34; Meléndez – 35; Substitutes; (substituted on) 80' Crisanto – 18; (substituted on) 82' Martínez – 8 (substituted on) 84' Mayorquín – 6 Coach; Vásquez (ARG)	Report	Starting XI; 25 – Torres (GK); 2 – Bernárdez; 3 – Córdova; 4 – Fernandes (red card) 46'; 7 – Discua (substituted off) 60'; 15 – Espinoza; 16 – Banegas (substituted off) 63'; 23 – Flores (substituted off) 39'; 27 – Arboleda; 29 – Johnson; 30 – Solano; Substitutes; 8 – Róchez (substituted on) 39'; 13 – Costly (substituted on) 60'; 38 – Martínez (substituted on) 63'; Coach (ARG) Vargas	Stadium: Estadio Tiburcio Carías Andino; Referee: Saíd Martínez

18 May 2019 Semifinals	Marathón	2–2 (2–4 agg.)	Motagua	San Pedro Sula
15:00	Arboleda 36' 41' Starting XI (GK) Torres – 25; Bernárdez – 2 Córdova – 3 (substituted off) 80' Discua – 7 Costly – 13; (substituted off) 68' Espinoza – 15; Banegas – 16; (substituted off) 62' Lahera – 24; Arboleda – 27; Johnson – 29; Solano – 30; Substitutes; (substituted on) 62' Róchez – 8 (substituted on) 68' Ramírez – 9 (substituted on) 80' Romero – 22; Coach; Vargas (ARG)	Report	47' Estigarribia; 73' Montes Starting XI; 19 – Rougier (GK); 2 – Montes; 4 – Peña; 5 – Pereira; 6 – Mayorquín (substituted off) 46'; 10 – Galvaliz (substituted off) 66'; 17 – Maldonado (yellow card) 52' (yellow-red card) 76'; 21 – Moreira (substituted off) 53'; 22 – Estigarribia; 24 – Elvir; 34 – López; Substitutes; 8 – Martínez (substituted on) 46'; 11 – Vega (substituted on) 53'; 35 – Meléndez (substituted on) 66'; Coach (ARG) Vásquez	Stadium: Estadio Yankel Rosenthal; Referee: Óscar Moncada

26 May 2019 Final	Motagua	2–2	Olimpia	Tegucigalpa
16:00	Pereira 18' 22' Starting XI (GK) Rougier – 19; Montes – 2 (substituted off) 86' Peña – 4 Pereira – 5 (substituted off) 65' Galvaliz – 10; Castellanos – 16; Moreira – 21; (substituted off) 71' Estigarribia – 22; Elvir – 24; López – 34; Meléndez – 35; Substitutes; (substituted on) 65' Martínez – 8 (substituted on) 71' Vega – 11; (substituted on) 86' Mayorquín – 6 Coach; Vásquez (ARG)	Report	2' Alvarado; (penalty missed) Bengtson; 90' (o.g.) Pereira Starting XI; 1 – Menjívar (GK); 3 – Güity; 5 – Alvarado; 9 – Benguché; 10 – Sosa; 17 – Paz; 20 – Flores (substituted off) 53'; 23 – Álvarez; 24 – Reyes (substituted off) 46'; 26 – Núñez; 27 – Bengtson; Substitutes; 12 – Chavasco (substituted on) 46'; 29 – Mejía (substituted on) 53' Coach (URU) Keosseián	Stadium: Estadio Tiburcio Carías Andino; Referee: Melissa Borjas

2 June 2019 Final	Olimpia	0–1 (2–3 agg.)	Motagua	Tegucigalpa
16:00	Starting XI (GK) Menjívar – 1 Güity – 3 Alvarado – 5 (substituted off) 68' Benguché – 9 (substituted off) 57' Sosa – 10; Paz – 17; (substituted off) 11' Rodríguez – 18; Flores – 20; Álvarez – 23; Núñez – 26; Bengtson – 27; Substitutes; (substituted on) 11' Chavasco – 12; (substituted on) 57' Lacayo – 14; (substituted on) 68' Reyes – 24; Coach; Keosseián (URU)	Report	18' Moreira Starting XI; 19 – Rougier (GK); 4 – Peña (substituted off) 46'; 5 – Pereira; 10 – Galvaliz (substituted off) 76'; 16 – Castellanos; 17 – Maldonado; 21 – Moreira (substituted off) 65'; 22 – Estigarribia; 24 – Elvir; 34 – López; 35 – Meléndez; Substitutes; 6 – Mayorquín (substituted on) 46'; 11 – Vega (substituted on) 65'; 18 – Crisanto (substituted on) 76'; Coach (ARG) Vásquez	Stadium: Estadio Tiburcio Carías Andino; Referee: Armando Castro

== Top goalscorers ==
The top scorer was determined by the addition of goals of both Apertura and Clausura tournaments in all their phases.

As of 2 June 2019

- 24 goals:

(Honduras) Jerry Bengtson (Olimpia)

- 21 goals:

(Honduras) Jorge Benguché (UPNFM / Olimpia)
(Paraguay) Roberto Moreira (Motagua)

- 20 goals:

(Colombia) Justin Arboleda (Marathón)

- 16 goals:

(Honduras) Carlos Lanza (Juticalpa)

- 15 goals:

(Colombia) Yerson Gutiérrez (Honduras Progreso)

- 10 goals:

(Honduras) Franco Güity (Juticalpa / UPNFM)
Frelys López (Honduras Progreso)
(Honduras) Kevin López (Motagua)

- 9 goals:

(Honduras) Darixon Vuelto (Real España)
(Honduras) Ángel Tejeda (Real España)
(Honduras) Carlos Bernárdez (Vida)
(Honduras) Óscar Salas (Olimpia / Juticalpa)
(Honduras) Kilmar Peña (UPNFM)

- 8 goals:

(Honduras) Rubilio Castillo (Motagua)
(Cuba) Yaudel Lahera (Marathón)
(Honduras) Jhow Benavídez (Real España)
(Trinidad and Tobago) Rundell Winchester (Platense)
(Honduras) Erick Andino (Motagua)
(Honduras) Carlos Discua (Marathón)
(Honduras) Iván López (Real España)

- 7 goals:

(Honduras) Joshua Nieto (Platense)
(Colombia) Javier Estupiñán (Motagua / Juticalpa)
(Argentina) Marcelo Estigarribia (Motagua)

- 6 goals:

(Honduras) Rony Martínez (Olimpia / Real España)
Juan Delgado (Honduras Progreso)
(Honduras) Árnold Meléndez (UPNFM)

- 5 goals:

(Honduras) Jeancarlo Vargas (Platense)
(Brazil) Israel Silva (Real de Minas)
(Honduras) Carlo Costly (Olimpia / Marathón)
(Honduras) Mario Martínez (Real España)
(Honduras) Bryan Johnson (Marathón)
(Honduras) Kervin Arriaga (Platense)
(Honduras) Eddie Hernández (Vida)
(Honduras) Juan Mejía (Real de Minas)

- 4 goals:

(Honduras) Alexander Aguilar (Platense)
(Honduras) Diego Reyes (Olimpia / Platense)
(Honduras) Gerson Rodas (Platense)
(Honduras) José Tobías (H. Progreso / R. España)
(Honduras) Johnny Leverón (Real España)
(Honduras) Jesús Canales (Vida)
(Honduras) Jesse Moncada (Real de Minas)
(Honduras) Darwin Andino (Real de Minas)
(Honduras) Marcelo Pereira (Motagua)

- 3 goals:

(Honduras) José Pinto (UPNFM)
(Honduras) Ronald Montoya (UPNFM)
(Colombia) James Cabezas (Juticalpa)
(Honduras) Marvin Cálix (UPNFM)
(Honduras) Júnior Lacayo (Olimpia)
(Honduras) Michael Osorio (Vida / UPNFM)
(Honduras) Foslyn Grant (Vida)
(Honduras) Víctor Moncada (Juticalpa / UPNFM)
(Honduras) Rembrandt Flores (Real de Minas)
(Honduras) Elmer Güity (Olimpia)
(Honduras) Aldo Oviedo (Real de Minas)
(Honduras) Edwin Solano (Marathón)
(Honduras) Henry Romero (Marathón)

- 2 goals:

(Honduras) Édgar Álvarez (Platense)
(Honduras) Moisés López (Real de Minas)
(Honduras) Miguel Flores (Vida)
(Honduras) Samuel Córdova (Marathón)
(Honduras) Óscar Padilla (Real de Minas)
(Trinidad and Tobago) Jerrel Britto (Platense)
(Honduras) Cholby Martínez (Vida)
(Honduras) Brayan Velásquez (Olimpia)
(Honduras) Kevin Álvarez (Olimpia)
(Honduras) Júnior Padilla (UPNFM)
(Colombia) Juan Bolaños (Platense)
Walter Ramos (Honduras Progreso)
(Honduras) Pedro Mencía (Platense)
(Honduras) Nissi Sauceda (UPNFM)
(Honduras) José Reyes (Olimpia)
(Honduras) Luis Lobo (Platense / Juticalpa)
(Honduras) Edwin Rodríguez (Olimpia)
(Honduras) Jorge Álvarez (UPNFM / Olimpia)
(Honduras) Wilmer Crisanto (Motagua)
(Honduras) Diego Rodríguez (Real de Minas)
(Honduras) Marlon Ramírez (Marathón)
Erick Peña (Honduras Progreso)
(Honduras) Jairo Puerto (Real España)
(Honduras) Nelson Muñoz (Real de Minas)
(Argentina) Matías Galvaliz (Motagua)
(Honduras) Juan Montes (Motagua)
(Honduras) Ever Alvarado (Olimpia)

- 1 goal:

Clinton Arzú (Honduras Progreso)
(Honduras) Maylor Núñez (Juticalpa)
(Uruguay) Maximiliano Callorda (Real España)
(Honduras) Carlos Mejía (Vida)
(Honduras) Christian Martínez (UPNFM)
(Honduras) Dábirson Castillo (Olimpia)
(Honduras) Gétsel Montes (Real España)
(Honduras) Jorge Claros (Real España)
(Honduras) Lázaro Yánez (UPNFM)
Román Valencia (Honduras Progreso)
Franklyn Morales (Honduras Progreso)
(Honduras) Marco Vega (Motagua)
(Honduras) Brayan Acosta (Real de Minas)
(Honduras) Álex Corrales (Real de Minas)
(Honduras) Carlos Róchez (Marathón)
(Honduras) Frédixon Elvir (Real de Minas)
(Honduras) Jerry Palacios (Real de Minas)
(Honduras) Luís Palma (Vida)
(Honduras) Marvin Bernárdez (Vida)
(Honduras) Richard Martínez (Real de Minas)
(Honduras) Julián Galo (Real de Minas)
(Honduras) Denis Meléndez (Vida)
(Honduras) Elder Torres (Vida)
(Honduras) Sergio Peña (Motagua)
(Honduras) Walter Martínez (Motagua)
(Honduras) Javier Portillo (Vida)
(Honduras) César Oseguera (Real España)
(Honduras) Denil Maldonado (Motagua)
(Colombia) Luís Castro (Platense)
(Honduras) Bayron Méndez (Juticalpa)
(Honduras) Aldo Fajardo (Platense)
(Honduras) Josué Villafranca (Motagua)
(Honduras) Brayan Martínez (Marathón)
Dylan Andrade (Honduras Progreso)
Jorge Cardona (Honduras Progreso)
(Honduras) Henry Ayala (Juticalpa)
(Honduras) Luís Guzmán (Real de Minas)
(Honduras) Ian Osorio (UPNFM)
(Honduras) Bryan Bernárdez (Marathón)
(Argentina) Emiliano Bonfigli (Olimpia)
(Honduras) Esdras Padilla (Vida)
Milton Castro (Honduras Progreso)
(Honduras) Allans Vargas (Real España)
(Honduras) German Mejía (Olimpia)
(Honduras) Edgar Vásquez (UPNFM)
(Uruguay) Leandro Sosa (Olimpia)
(Honduras) Alfredo Mejía (Real España)
(Honduras) Kevin Maradiaga (Real de Minas)
(Honduras) Jeffri Flores (Platense)
(Uruguay) Francisco Techera (Juticalpa)
(Honduras) Marvin Barrios (Juticalpa)
(Honduras) Óscar García (Real de Minas)
(Brazil) Caue Fernandes (Marathón)
(Honduras) Jeffry Miranda (Marathón)
(Honduras) Devron García (Vida)
(Honduras) Denis Lagos (UPNFM)
(Honduras) Jairo Róchez (UPNFM)
Erlin Gutiérrez (Honduras Progreso)
(Honduras) José García (Real de Minas)
(Honduras) Óliver Morazán (Juticalpa)
(Honduras) Deybi Flores (Olimpia)

- 1 own-goal:

(Honduras) Brayan Acosta (Real de Minas)
(Honduras) José Murillo (Juticalpa)
Luis González (Honduras Progreso)
(Honduras) Wilfredo Barahona (Juticalpa)
(Honduras) Esdras Padilla (Real de Minas)
(Colombia) Luís Castro (Platense)
(Honduras) Juan Montes (Motagua)
(Argentina) Martín Bonjour (Olimpia)
Walter Ramos (Honduras Progreso)
(Honduras) Marcelo Pereira (Motagua)

== Aggregate table ==
Relegation was determined by the aggregated table of both Apertura and Clausura tournaments. After 36 rounds, C.D. Real de Minas, Juticalpa F.C. and C.D. Honduras Progreso finished with 31 points each, with the goal difference being irrelevant. All three teams had to play a one round-robin playoff to determine the team to be relegated. It was only the second time in league's history that three teams were involved in a relegation triangular, the first one being held back in 1989.

Pos	Team	Pld	W	D	L	GF	GA	GD	Pts	Qualification or relegation
1	Olimpia (Q)	36	19	12	5	56	30	+26	69	CONCACAF League round of 16 (Note: As Apertura and Clausura runners-up (HON2))
2	Motagua (Q)	36	20	8	8	57	26	+31	68	CONCACAF League round of 16 (Note: As Apertura and Clausura champions (HON1))
3	Marathón (Q)	36	17	11	8	60	46	+14	62	CONCACAF League preliminary round (Note: As semi-finalists with best aggregate record (HON3))
4	UPNFM	36	15	12	9	47	36	+11	57	
5	Real España	36	14	12	10	50	40	+10	54	
6	Platense	36	13	10	13	46	38	+8	49	
7	Vida	36	6	14	16	35	53	−18	32	
8	Real de Minas	36	7	10	19	36	60	−24	31	Qualification to Relegation playoffs (Note: To decide the team relegated, tiebreakers are not applied to teams tied on points, so the three bottom teams enter the relegation playoffs.)
9	Juticalpa	36	5	16	15	39	67	−28	31	Qualification to Relegation playoffs
10	Honduras Progreso	36	8	7	21	38	68	−30	31	Qualification to Relegation playoffs

Source: Soccerway Soccerway
Rules for classification: 1) points; 2) goal difference; 3) number of goals scored.
(Q) Qualified for the phase indicated

=== Relegation playoffs ===
Pos	Team	Pld	W	D	L	GF	GA	GD	Pts	Relegation
1	Honduras Progreso	2	2	0	0	5	3	+2	6	
2	Real de Minas	2	1	0	1	6	5	+1	3	
3	Juticalpa	2	0	0	2	3	6	−3	0	Relegated to 2019–20 Liga de Ascenso

Updated to match(es) played on 12 May 2019. Source: Soccerway
Rules for classification: 1) points; 2) goal difference; 3) number of goals scored.

5 May 2019 Game 1	Juticalpa	1–2	Honduras Progreso	Juticalpa
15:00	Salas 57' Starting XI (GK) Pineda – 19; Barrios – 3 Palacios – 6 (substituted off) 71' Ocampo – 7 Morazán – 8 Lanza – 10; (substituted off) 51' Méndez – 13; Techera – 15; Lobo – 23; Salas – 26; Barahona – 44; Substitutes; (substituted on) 51' Estupiñán – 9 (substituted on) 71' Cruz – 24 Coach; Cruz (HON)	Report	49' 90' López Starting XI; 12 – Castro (GK); 3 – Hernández; 6 – Delgado; 7 – López; 9 – Y. Gutiérrez (substituted off) 57'; 10 – Morales (substituted off) 79'; 16 – Caminos (substituted off) 70'; 19 – Smith; 24 – Y. L. Gutiérrez; 29 – Almendárez; 30 – Peña; Substitutes; 14 – Arzú (substituted on) 57'; 27 – Cardona (substituted on) 70'; 4 – González (substituted on) 79'; Coach (HON) Alvarado	Stadium: Estadio Juan Ramón Brevé Vargas; Referee: Héctor Rodríguez

9 May 2019 Game 2	Honduras Progreso	3–2	Real de Minas	El Progreso
15:00	Gutiérrez 13'; López 32'; Delgado 63' Starting XI (GK) Castro –12; Hernández – 3 Delgado – 6 López – 7 (substituted off) 71' Morales – 10; (substituted off) 82' Caminos – 16; Smith – 19; Y. L. Gutiérrez – 24; (substituted off) 55' E. Gutiérrez – 25; Almendárez – 29; Peña – 30; Substitutes; (substituted on) 55' Y. Gutiérrez – 9 (substituted on) 71' Arzú – 14; (substituted on) 82' Cardona – 27; Coach; Alvarado (HON)	Report	30' Moncada; 69' García Starting XI; 1 – Archibald (GK); 5 – Rodríguez (substituted off) 61'; 8 – Oviedo (substituted off) 46'; 10 – Moncada; 12 – Vallejo; 13 – J. García; 18 – Guzmán; 20 – Pineda (substituted off) 78'; 26 – Corrales; 27 – Ó García; 29 – Mejía; Substitutes; 33 – Flores (substituted on) 46' ? – Andino (substituted on) 61'; 28 – Martínez (substituted on) 78'; Coach (HON) Cáceres	Stadium: Estadio Humberto Micheletti; Referee: Saíd Martínez

12 May 2019 Game 3	Real de Minas	4–2	Juticalpa	Danlí
15:45	Mejía 4' 21'; Muñoz 70'; Andino 90+4' (GK) Archibald – 1 Muñoz – 3 Moncada – 10; J. García – 13; Guzmán – 18; Pineda – 20; Corrales – 26; (substituted off) 57' Ó. García – 27; (substituted off) 74' Mejía – 29; (substituted off) 79' Flores – 33; Medina – 35; Substitutes; (substituted on) 57' Andino – ? (substituted on) 74' Oviedo – 8 (substituted on) 79' Rodríguez – 5 Coach; Cáceres (HON)	Report	18' Morazán; 44' Estupiñán 1 – West (GK); 3 – Barrios (substituted off) 68'; 4 – Colón; 8 – Morazán; 9 – Estupiñán; 10 – Lanza; 15 – Techera; 20 – Espinal (substituted off) 46'; 23 – Lobo (substituted off) 53'; 26 – Salas; 44 – Barahona; Substitutes; 7 – Ocampo (substituted on) 46'; 53 – Ulloa (substituted on) 53'; 17 – Ramírez (substituted on) 68'; Coach (HON) Cruz	Stadium: Estadio Marcelo Tinoco; Referee: Nelson Salgado

== Controversies ==
- Right off the start of the season, week 1 was involved with controversy. Platense F.C. accused F.C. Motagua for instructing the ball boys of hiding and holding the sideline balls in the last minutes of play, making it difficult to resume the game when the match ball went out of play. Motagua was later fined for this action. That same day, in San Pedro Sula, C.D. Marathón requested C.D.S. Vida players to pay tribute to the club with El Pasillo, (the act of acknowledging the winners of the previous season), a tradition which is very popular in Spain, but not in Honduras. The Vida footballers strongly rejected the request. One week later, Vida simulated the Pasillo action after scoring a goal against Juticalpa F.C., a clear sign of mockery.
- After a 1–1 draw between C.D. Marathón and Club Deportivo Olimpia in the Clásico Nacional on week 3, a very irritated Marathón's coach Héctor Vargas, criticized the referee's performance and insinuated Olimpia's intervention at halftime by calling the referees to fix the match. Vargas also stated that his team with few resources is fighting on all fronts, and others with greater investments made a fool of themselves at international competitions; a clear dart to Real C.D. España who were eliminated from the 2018 CONCACAF League a few days earlier. Olimpia's manager, Nahúm Espinoza decided not to comment. However, Real España's Martín García expressed that Vargas is a very harmful person and his comments only reflect cowardice. Vargas replied back and called García a fat man. Vargas later announced that he will keep silent for 90 days; however, the Northern Discipline Commission cited Vargas to testify for violating discriminatory codes. He was suspended for three games.
- On week 5, Real C.D. España faced C.D. Marathón in the Clásico Sampedrano. In the pre-match, the game was already heated. Real España as hosts, announced that only people dressed with the home team colors would be allowed to access the stadium. The game elapsed with normalcy until Real España missed a penalty kick, which provoked the fury of the local crowd. A few fans invaded the pitch but were easily controlled by the police. A few minutes before the end, Marathón's keeper Dénovan Torres hit one of the sideline ball boys. This action triggered an energetic response from the Real España's subs which were warming up nearby. Torres and the entire Marathón's technical staff were expelled from the game. Some Marathón fans, including women, were beaten in the stands by their counterparts. Marathón requested the league the closure of the venue and Real España sued Torres for his actions. These and many other sanctions were imposed by the league.
- On 28 August 2018, the Central Discipline Regional Commission ruled in favor of C.D. Marathón awarding them a 3–0 victory over Juticalpa F.C. as a result of Juticalpa fielding defender Carlos Palacios on week 4. Palacios was ineligible to play due to his misconduct on the previous game against C.D. Honduras Progreso. Consequently, Marathón submitted the complaint and was granted the win. The original score ended in a 1–1 tie; therefore Marathón was awarded two points and Juticalpa was deducted one.
- Real C.D. España's player Ángel Tejeda was suspended for six games after spitting a fan during the Clásico Sampedrano against C.D. Marathón on week 14. Former Real España's president Mateo Yibrín annotated on his Twitter account that the Discipline Commission are "social misfits".
- Through Jorge Pineda (assistant for Héctor Vargas), C.D. Marathón announced their intention to protest the match against F.C. Motagua on week 7. This game, which ended 1–1 was postponed for several weeks. Marathón is alleging that Motagua's players Omar Elvir and Wilmer Crisanto were lined up in the reserves encounter a month prior. Marathón had already protested the game against Juticalpa F.C. on week 4 with success.
- The Apertura's final series between F.C. Motagua and Club Deportivo Olimpia were involved in controversies from start to finish. Before the first leg, the board of directors of Motagua expressed their discomfort for the designation of referee Héctor Rodríguez for the first leg, claiming they have felt harmed in previous games due to his controversial decisions against the club. Rodríguez did finally refereed the game which was ironically criticized by Olimpia. Olimpia's coach Manuel Keosseián said in an interview he was not "a weepy", but contradictory, he called for a press conference the following day where he expressed his reasons why they lost in the first game, mostly blaming the referees. Olimpia's defender Jonathan Paz was ejected from the first leg due to two successive yellow cards. The Discipline Commission, presided by Allan Pineda, a well known Olimpia supporter, called for a meeting and determined that Paz was severally penalized by the refs and nullified one of the bookings, enabling the defender to take part in the return leg. The second match evolved with normality until the final whistle, as Motagua were celebrating their victory, Olimpia's coach Keosseián stroked a punch to one of Motagua's fan entertainer.
- On 14 March 2019, a very peculiar incident happened in the Clásico Nacional between Club Deportivo Olimpia and C.D. Marathón, as both teams goalkeepers were ejected from the match due to violent conduct. Both managers had already burnt all their substitutions; therefore, in the last few minutes of the game two outfield players had to cover the goalies.
- In the early morning of 7 April 2019, C.D. Marathón's goalkeeper Dénovan Torres was arrested due to domestic violence.
