= 2019–20 Honduran Liga Nacional =

Liga Nacional
- Season: 2019–20
- Dates: 27 July 2019–15 March 2020
- Champions: Apertura: Olimpia; Clausura: None
- Relegated: None
- CONCACAF League: Olimpia; Marathón; Motagua
- Matches: 164
- Goals: 462 (2.82 per match)
- Top goalscorer: Mejía (23)
- Biggest home win: MOT 5–0 HNP (9 February 2020); OLI 5–0 HNP (12 February 2020); RES 5–0 UPN (22 February 2020); OLI 5–0 MAR (23 February 2020)
- Biggest away win: HNP 0–4 OLI (27 July 2019); PLA 0–4 MAR (22 September 2019); PLA 0–4 RDM (20 October 2019); HNP 0–4 PLA (21 February 2020)
- Highest scoring: RDM 4–4 MOT (14 August 2019); MAR 4–4 UPN (5 October 2019)
- Longest unbeaten run: MAR (9); OLI (9)
- Longest losing run: HNP (9)
- All statistics correct as of 15 March 2020.

The 2019–20 Honduran Liga Nacional season was the 54th Honduran Liga Nacional edition since its establishment in 1965. The tournament started in July 2019 and ended in March 2020. The season was divided into two halves (Apertura and Clausura), each crowning one champion. A new format will be used starting this season, each club plays the others twice (a double round-robin system), once at their home stadium and once at that of their opponents', for 18 games. The first five teams will advance to the post-season (Pentagonal), where they will play each other once. If the same team wins both phases, they will be crowned champions automatically; otherwise, a final series will be scheduled between the winners of both phases. This format was last used in 1992–93. At the end of the season, the three teams with the best record will qualify to the 2020 CONCACAF League.

Following the 13th matchday on 15 March 2020 the Clausura tournament was suspended due to the COVID-19 pandemic in Honduras. On 29 April the tournament was officially cancelled with no champion declared and no team relegated.

== 2019–20 teams ==
Location of teams in 2019–20 season

A total of 10 teams will contest the tournament, including 9 sides from the 2018–19 season plus C.D. Real Sociedad, promoted from the 2018–19 Liga de Ascenso.

Team	Location	Stadium	Capacity
Honduras Progreso	El Progreso	Estadio Humberto Micheletti	5,000
Marathón	San Pedro Sula	Estadio Yankel Rosenthal	15,000
Motagua	Tegucigalpa	Estadio Tiburcio Carías Andino	35,000
Olimpia	Tegucigalpa	Estadio Tiburcio Carías Andino	35,000
Platense	Puerto Cortés	Estadio Excélsior	7,910
Real de Minas	Danlí	Estadio Marcelo Tinoco	5,000
Real España	San Pedro Sula	Estadio Francisco Morazán	26,781
Real Sociedad	Tocoa	Estadio Francisco Martínez Durón	3,000
UPNFM	Choluteca	Estadio Emilio Williams Agasse	8,000
Vida	La Ceiba	Estadio Nilmo Edwards	18,000

- C.D. Real de Minas is from Tegucigalpa but will play at Danlí.
- Lobos UPNFM is from Tegucigalpa but will play at Choluteca.

== Managerial changes ==
Team	Outgoing manager	Manner of departure	Vacancy	Replaced by	Appointment	Position in table
Real España	(Colombia) Carlos Restrepo	Sacked	6 May 2019	(Costa Rica) Hernán Medford	10 June 2019	Preseason
Olimpia	(Uruguay) Manuel Keosseián	Sacked	5 June 2019	(Argentina) Pedro Troglio	14 June 2019	Preseason
Vida	(Honduras) Héctor Castellón	Resigned	10 June 2019	(Uruguay) Washington Araujo	20 June 2019	Preseason
Honduras Progreso	(Honduras) Luís Alvarado	Sacked	16 August 2019	(Colombia) Horacio Londoño	16 August 2019	10th
Platense	(Panama) José Torres	Sacked	2 September 2019	(Honduras) Héctor Castellón	3 September 2019	9th
Real Sociedad	(Honduras) Mauro Reyes	Sacked	16 September 2019	(Honduras) Carlos Tábora	16 September 2019	10th
Real España	(Costa Rica) Hernán Medford	Resigned	23 September 2019	(Honduras) Luis Ordóñez	24 September 2019	8th
Honduras Progreso	(Colombia) Horacio Londoño	Sacked	4 October 2019	TBD	TBA	9th
Real España	(Honduras) Luis Ordóñez	Separated	7 October 2019	(Uruguay) Ramiro Martínez	7 October 2019	7th

== Apertura ==
The Apertura tournament was the first half of the 2019–20 season which ran from July to December 2019. On 10 November, C.D. Olimpia secured their third straight spot in the final series after defeating C.D. Marathón 1–0 at Tegucigalpa. Olimpia, Marathón, F.C. Motagua, Lobos UPNFM and C.D.S. Vida advanced to the Pentagonal stage. After seven tournaments, Olimpia was able to stop the drought and won the Apertura tournament after winning both the regular season and post-season.

=== Regular season ===
==== Standings ====
Pos	Team	Pld	W	D	L	GF	GA	GD	Pts	Qualification or relegation
1	Olimpia	18	14	2	2	37	12	+25	44	Advance to Pentagonal and Final
2	Marathón	18	12	4	2	39	17	+22	40	Advance to Pentagonal
3	Motagua	18	9	4	5	26	21	+5	31	Advance to Pentagonal
4	UPNFM	18	7	5	6	24	23	+1	26	Advance to Pentagonal
5	Vida	18	7	4	7	24	24	0	25	Advance to Pentagonal
6	Real de Minas	18	7	2	9	25	29	−4	23	
7	Real España	18	5	7	6	26	25	+1	22	
8	Platense	18	6	3	9	28	36	−8	21	
9	Real Sociedad	18	2	4	12	12	30	−18	10	
10	Honduras Progreso	18	3	1	14	12	36	−24	10	

Updated to match(es) played on 20 November 2019. Source: Soccerway
Rules for classification: 1) points; 2) goal difference; 3) number of goals scored.

==== Results ====
Home \ Away	HNP	MAR	MOT	OLI	PLA	RDM	RES	RSO	UPN	VID
Honduras Progreso	—	1–3	0–1	0–4	1–2	1–0	1–1	0–1	0–1	2–3
Marathón	4–1	—	2–1	1–1	3–2	2–0	3–1	0–0	4–4	0–0
Motagua	2–1	1–0	—	1–2	2–1	1–1	1–1	2–1	3–1	3–1
Olimpia	4–0	1–0	2–0	—	1–2	5–1	1–1	2–0	1–0	1–0
Platense	0–1	0–4	2–3	2–1	—	0–4	4–2	1–1	1–1	3–0
Real de Minas	1–0	0–1	4–4	1–2	3–1	—	1–2	2–1	3–2	1–0
Real España	3–0	2–4	1–0	0–2	2–2	5–1	—	3–0	1–2	0–2
Real Sociedad	0–1	2–5	0–0	1–2	3–1	0–2	0–0	—	0–2	1–3
UPNFM	3–2	0–1	0–1	0–2	1–0	1–0	1–1	2–0	—	2–2
Vida	3–0	0–2	1–0	2–3	3–4	1–0	0–0	2–1	1–1	—

Updated to match(es) played on 20 November 2019. Source: Soccerway
Legend: Blue = home team win; Yellow = draw; Red = away team win.
For upcoming matches, an "a" indicates there is an article about the rivalry between the two participants.

=== Postseason ===
==== Standings ====
Pos	Team	Pld	W	D	L	GF	GA	GD	Pts	Qualification or relegation
1	Olimpia	4	3	0	1	10	2	+8	9	Apertura winners
2	Motagua	4	3	0	1	10	5	+5	9	
3	Vida	4	1	1	2	7	11	−4	4	
4	UPNFM	4	1	1	2	5	9	−4	4	
5	Marathón	4	0	2	2	5	10	−5	2	

Updated to match(es) played on 8 December 2019. Source: Soccerway
Rules for classification: 1) points; 2) goal difference; 3) number of goals scored.

==== Results ====
Home \ Away	MAR	MOT	OLI	UPN	VID
Marathón	—	1–2			2–2
Motagua		—		3–0	5–2
Olimpia	4–0	2–0	—		
UPNFM	2–2		0–3	—	
Vida			2–1	1–3	—

Updated to match(es) played on 8 December 2019. Source: Soccerway
Legend: Blue = home team win; Yellow = draw; Red = away team win.
For upcoming matches, an "a" indicates there is an article about the rivalry between the two participants.

==== Final ====
The final series were scheduled to be played between the winners of the regular season and the Final 5 Stage (Pentagonal). Since C.D. Olimpia won both phases, no finals were necessary.

== Clausura ==
The Clausura tournament was the second half of the 2019–20 season which runs from January to March 2020.

=== Regular season ===
==== Standings ====
Pos	Team	Pld	W	D	L	GF	GA	GD	Pts
1	Motagua	13	8	3	2	25	10	+15	27
2	Marathón	13	7	3	3	25	18	+7	24
3	Olimpia	13	6	4	3	26	15	+11	22
4	Real España	13	7	0	6	20	13	+7	21
5	Vida	12	3	8	1	13	10	+3	17
6	Real de Minas	13	5	2	6	16	18	−2	17
7	Real Sociedad	12	3	5	4	13	17	−4	14
8	Platense	13	3	3	7	16	24	−8	12
9	UPNFM	13	1	7	5	8	18	−10	10
10	Honduras Progreso	13	1	5	7	10	29	−19	8

Updated to match(es) played on 15 March 2020. Source: Soccerway
Rules for classification: 1) points; 2) goal difference; 3) number of goals scored.

==== Results ====
Home \ Away	HNP	MAR	MOT	OLI	PLA	RDM	RES	RSO	UPN	VID
Honduras Progreso	—	1–2		0–0	0–4		1–2	2–2		1–1
Marathón	1–0	—	a	1–2	5–2	3–0	3–0	1–2	2–2	
Motagua	5–0	1–1	—	4–1		2–3	1–0	2–0	0–0	
Olimpia	5–0	5–0	1–2	—	2–0	2–1	a			1–1
Platense	4–1	2–4	0–3		—		2–1	1–1	0–0	0–1
Real de Minas	1–2		0–0		4–0	—	0–3	1–0	1–0	
Real España		a	0–1	2–1	2–1	3–0	—		5–0	0–2
Real Sociedad	1–1	1–2		2–2		1–4	1–0	—	1–0	1–1
UPNFM	1–1		1–3	1–1		1–0	0–2		—	1–1
Vida		0–0	3–1	1–3	0–0	1–1			1–1	—

Updated to match(es) played on 15 March 2020. Source: Soccerway
Legend: Blue = home team win; Yellow = draw; Red = away team win.
For upcoming matches, an "a" indicates there is an article about the rivalry between the two participants.

== Top goalscorers ==
The top goalscorer will be determined by the addition of goals of both Apertura and Clausura tournaments.

As of 15 March 2020

- 23 goals:

(Honduras) Juan Mejía (Real de Minas)

- 17 goals:

(Honduras) Jorge Benguché (Olimpia)

- 15 goals:

(Paraguay) Roberto Moreira (Motagua)
(Honduras) Jerry Bengtson (Olimpia)

- 14 goals:

(Honduras) Franco Güity (UPNFM)

- 13 goals:

(Colombia) Justin Arboleda (Marathón / Olimpia)

- 11 goals:

(Argentina) Bruno Volpi (Platense / Marathón)

- 10 goals:

(Honduras) Rony Martínez (Real España)

- 9 goals:

(Honduras) Josué Villafranca (Vida)
(Honduras) Mario Martínez (Marathón)
(Honduras) Carlo Costly (Marathón / Platense)
(Honduras) Carlos Discua (Marathón)

- 8 goals:

(Grenada) Jamal Charles (R. España / R. Sociedad)

- 7 goals:

(Argentina) Marcelo Estigarribia (Motagua)
(Honduras) Alexander Aguilar (Platense / Vida)
(Honduras) Jhow Benavídez (Real España)
(Honduras) Kevin López (Motagua)
(Honduras) Diego Reyes (Platense)

- 6 goals:

(Honduras) Eddie Hernández (Olimpia)
(Honduras) Kílmar Peña (UPNFM)
(Honduras) Edwin Solano (Marathón)
(Honduras) Carlos Meléndez (Vida)
(Argentina) Matías Garrido (Olimpia)
(Honduras) Darixon Vuelto (Real España)

- 5 goals:

(Honduras) Frelys López (Marathón)
(Honduras) José Pinto (UPNFM / Olimpia)
(Honduras) Jeancarlo Vargas (Platense)
(Honduras) Ilce Barahona (Platense)
(Honduras) Rubilio Castillo (Motagua)

- 4 goals:

(Trinidad and Tobago) Jerrel Britto (Honduras Progreso)
(Honduras) Aldo Oviedo (Real de Minas)
(Colombia) Óscar Móvil (Real Sociedad)
(Argentina) Matías Galvaliz (Motagua)
(Honduras) Esdras Padilla (Vida)
(Honduras) Marco Vega (Motagua)
(Honduras) Kervin Arriaga (Marathón)
(Honduras) Árnold Meléndez (UPNFM)
(Honduras) Iván López (Real España)
(Colombia) Yerson Gutiérrez (Marathón)
(Uruguay) Delis Vargas (Real España)
(Argentina) Gonzalo Klusener (Motagua)
(Honduras) Jesse Moncada (Real de Minas)

- 3 goals:

(Honduras) Joshua Nieto (Platense)
(Uruguay) Mathías Techera (Vida)
(Honduras) Júnior Lacayo (Olimpia)
(Honduras) Kemsie Abbott (Real Sociedad)
(Honduras) Éver Alvarado (Olimpia)
(Honduras) Ángel Rodríguez (Vida)
(Honduras) Ronal Montoya (UPNFM)
(Honduras) Denis Meléndez (Vida)
(Argentina) Esteban Espíndola (Marathón)
(Honduras) Osman Melgares (Real Sociedad)
(Colombia) Rafael Agámez (Honduras Progreso)
(Honduras) Jeison Mejía (Real Sociedad)

- 2 goals:

(Honduras) Sergio Peña (Motagua)
(Colombia) Winston Mezú (Platense)
Edder Delgado (Honduras Progreso)
(Honduras) Mikel García (Real España)
(Panama) Ronaldo Dinolis (Real España)
(Honduras) Devron García (Real España)
(Russia) Evgeni Kabaev (Real de Minas)
(Honduras) Brayan Beckeles (Olimpia)
(Honduras) Juan Montes (Motagua)
Franklin Morales (Honduras Progreso)
(Honduras) Michaell Chirinos (Olimpia)
(Honduras) Marvin Bernárdez (Vida)
(Honduras) Félix Crisanto (Motagua)
(Honduras) Ángel Tejeda (Real España)
(Honduras) Carlos Pineda (Olimpia)
(Argentina) Nicolás Lugli (Platense)
Davis Argueta (Honduras Progreso)
(Honduras) Marlon Ramírez (H. Progreso / Marathón)
(Honduras) Reinieri Mayorquín (Motagua)
(Honduras) Carlos Sánchez (Vida)
(Honduras) José García (Real de Minas)

- 1 goal:

(Argentina) Cristian Maidana (Olimpia)
(Honduras) Selvin Guevara (Real España)
(Honduras) Marcelo Pereira (Motagua)
(Honduras) Ángel Velásquez (Platense)
(Honduras) Marcelo Canales (Vida)
(Honduras) Deyron Martínez (Real Sociedad)
(Honduras) Allans Vargas (Real España)
(Honduras) Franklin Flores (Real España)
(Honduras) Sebastián Colón (Real de Minas)
(Honduras) Denil Maldonado (Motagua)
(Mexico) Jesús Rivera (Vida)
Pedro Mencía (Honduras Progreso)
(Honduras) Axel Gómez (Olimpia)
(Honduras) Víctor Moncada (UPNFM)
(Honduras) Mayron Flores (Marathón)
(Honduras) Júnior Padilla (UPNFM)
(Honduras) Luís Meléndez (Vida)
(Honduras) Sony Fernández (UPNFM)
(Honduras) Emilio Izaguirre (Motagua)
(Honduras) Carlos Róchez (Marathón)
Erick Peña (Honduras Progreso)
(Honduras) Kendrick Cárcamo (Real Sociedad)
(Honduras) Danny Mejía (Real Sociedad)
(Honduras) José Reyes (Olimpia)
(Honduras) Horacio Argueta (Vida)
(Honduras) Dennis Lagos (UPNFM)
(Honduras) Edwin Rodríguez (Olimpia)
Gerson Rodas (Honduras Progreso)
(Honduras) Rody Meléndez (Real España)
(Honduras) Julio Moncada (Platense)
(Honduras) José López (Marathón)
(Honduras) Jeffry Miranda (Marathón)
(Honduras) Aldo Fajardo (Platense)
(Argentina) Jonathan Ferrari (Olimpia)
(Honduras) German Mejía (Olimpia)
(Honduras) Wilmer Crisanto (Motagua)
Juan Delgado (Honduras Progreso)
(Honduras) Samuel Elvir (UPNFM)
Samuel Lucas (Honduras Progreso)
(Honduras) Carlos Perdomo (Marathón)
(Honduras) Wilmer Fuentes (Real Sociedad)
(Honduras) César Guillén (Vida)
(Honduras) Luis Palma (Vida)
(Cuba) Yaudel Lahera (Honduras Progreso)
(Honduras) Darwin Andino (Real de Minas)
(Honduras) Jorge Claros (Real España)
(Honduras) Jeffri Flores (Platense)
(Argentina) Cristian Alessandrini (Vida)
(Honduras) Bayron Méndez (Real Sociedad)
(Paraguay) José Cañete (Olimpia)
(Honduras) Pedro González (Olimpia)
(Honduras) Henry Figueroa (Marathón)
Jorge Saldívar (Honduras Progreso)
Hilder Colón (Honduras Progreso)
(Honduras) Joshua Vargas (Platense)
(Honduras) Víctor Araúz (Platense)
(Uruguay) Santiago Correa (Real España)
(Honduras) Deybi Flores (Olimpia)
(Honduras) Óscar García (Real de Minas)
(Honduras) Diego Rodríguez (Real de Minas)
(Honduras) Carlos Lanza (Vida)
(Honduras) Sendel Cruz (UPNFM)
(Honduras) Dábirson Castillo (Platense)
(Honduras) Ted Bodden (UPNFM)
(Honduras) Luís Guzmán (Real de Minas)

- 1 own-goal:

(Honduras) Wisdom Quaye (Vida)
(Panama) Azmahar Ariano (Marathón)
(Honduras) Lesvin Medina (UPNFM)
(Honduras) Carlos Meléndez (Vida)
(Honduras) Sony Fernández (UPNFM)
(Honduras) Kevin Espinoza (Marathón)
(Honduras) Henry Ayala (Platense)
(Honduras) Ronal Montoya (UPNFM)
(Honduras) Raúl Santos (Motagua)

== Aggregate table ==
Relegation will be determined by the aggregated table of both Apertura and Clausura tournaments.

Pos	Team	Pld	W	D	L	GF	GA	GD	Pts
1	Olimpia	31	20	6	5	63	27	+36	66
2	Marathón	31	19	7	5	64	35	+29	64
3	Motagua	31	17	7	7	51	31	+20	58
4	Real España	31	12	7	12	46	38	+8	43
5	Vida	30	10	12	8	37	34	+3	42
6	Real de Minas	31	12	4	15	41	47	−6	40
7	UPNFM	31	8	12	11	32	41	−9	36
8	Platense	31	9	6	16	44	60	−16	33
9	Real Sociedad	30	5	9	16	25	47	−22	24
10	Honduras Progreso	31	4	6	21	22	65	−43	18

Updated to match(es) played on 15 March 2020. Source: Soccerway
Rules for classification: 1) points; 2) goal difference; 3) number of goals scored.
