= Edrick Menjívar =

Honduran footballer (born 1991 )

Personal information
- Full name: Edrick Eduardo Menjívar Jonhnson
- Date of birth: 1 March 1993 (age 33)
- Place of birth: La Ceiba, Honduras
- Height: 1.93 m (6 ft 4 in)
- Position: Goalkeeper

Team information
- Current team: Olimpia
- Number: 1

Senior career*
Years	Team	Apps	(Gls)
2015–	Olimpia	326	(1)

International career^{‡}
2018–	Honduras	40	(0)
Medal record
Men's football
Representing Honduras
CONCACAF Nations League
Third place	2021
- * Club domestic league appearances and goals as of 2 June 2026 ‡ National team caps and goals as of 22 May 2026

Edrick Eduardo Menjívar Jonhnson (born 1 March 1993) is a Honduran professional footballer who plays as a goalkeeper for Liga Nacional club Olimpia and the Honduras national team.

== Early life ==
A native of Roatán, Honduras, Menjívar grew up in the West End village in the northwestern side of the island. As a child, he already had an affinity for goalkeeping, and during his youth years at the Roatan Bilingual School, his peers nicknamed him "Superman", due to his high-flying saves. In 2010, Menjívar left the coastal island and traveled to Tegucigalpa to attend a tryout for F.C. Motagua. Motagua's city rivals, C.D. Olimpia, learned of this and sent a club representative to persuade Menjívar to sign with Olimpia.

== Club career ==
On 22 October 2015, Menjívar made his debut for Olimpia in the CONCACAF Champions League, a 1–0 home victory against Vancouver Whitecaps FC. His league debut came the following 11 November in El Clásico Nacional against Motagua, where Olimpia lost 0–1 at home. Menjívar was the starting goalkeeper for Olimpia when they won the 2022 CONCACAF League. With a 5-4 aggregate victory over Alajuelense of Costa Rica in the final, Menjívar helped Olimpia became the first side to win the tournament twice, as he also featured in the first win in 2017.

On 25 August 2024, Menjívar scored a dramatic late goal against Juticalpa in the league, securing a 1–1 draw in the 98th minute.

== International career ==
On 21 November 2018, Menjivar made his senior debut for the Honduras national team against Chile in a 4–1 loss. In November 2023, he received two yellow cards in a single match against Mexico in the CONCACAF Nations League quarter final without receiving a red card because the second yellow card occurred in the penalty shoot-out.

Menjívar briefly retired from the national team following Honduras's draw with Costa Rica on 13 November 2025 in the last match of World Cup qualification, which eliminated both countries from the 2026 FIFA World Cup, despite starting all ten matches in the qualifying period and only conceding four goals. Following the arrival of new Honduras head coach José Francisco Molina, Menjívar was convinced to reverse his decision in March 2026.

== Career statistics ==
=== Club ===
As of match played on 2 June 2026

Appearances and goals by club, season and competition
Club	Season	League			Cup		Continental		Other		Total	
Club	Season	Division	Apps	Goals	Apps	Goals	Apps	Goals	Apps	Goals	Apps	Goals
Olimpia	2015–16	Liga Nacional	3	0	—		1	0	—		4	0
Olimpia	2016–17	Liga Nacional	9	0	—		—		—		9	0
Olimpia	2017–18	Liga Nacional	20	0	—		1	0	—		21	0
Olimpia	2018–19	Liga Nacional	36	0	—		—		—		36	0
Olimpia	2019–20	Liga Nacional	19	0	—		7	0	—		26	0
Olimpia	2020–21	Liga Nacional	36	0	—		4	0	—		40	0
Olimpia	2021–22	Liga Nacional	40	0	—		1	0	—		41	0
Olimpia	2022–23	Liga Nacional	38	0	—		10	0	—		48	0
Olimpia	2023–24	Liga Nacional	43	0	—		4	0	—		47	0
Olimpia	2024–25	Liga Nacional	39	1			4	0			43	1
Olimpia	2025–26	Liga Nacional	43	0			8	0			51	0
Olimpia	Total		326	1	—		40	0	—		366	1
Career total			326	1	—		40	0	—		366	1

=== International ===
As of match played 2 July 2025

National team	Year	Apps	Goals
Honduras	2018	1	0
Honduras	2020	0	0
Honduras	2021	2	0
Honduras	2022	3	0
Honduras	2023	9	0
Honduras	2024	9	0
Honduras	2025	5	0
Total		29	0

== Honours ==
Olimpia

- Liga Nacional: 2016 Clausura, 2019 Apertura, 2020 Apertura, 2021 Clausura, 2021 Apertura, 2022 Apertura, 2023 Clausura, 2023 Apertura, 2024 Clausura, 2025 Clausura, 2025 Apertura
- Honduran Cup: 2015
- CONCACAF League: 2017, 2022

Honduras

- CONCACAF Nations League third place: 2021
