= Sebastian Colón =

Colombian footballer (born 1998)

Personal information
- Full name: Sebastian José Colón
- Date of birth: 25 June 1998 (age 28)
- Position: Midfielder

Team information
- Current team: Marathón

Senior career*
Years	Team	Apps	(Gls)
2019	Real de Minas	8	(1)
2020–	Marathón	1	(0)
- * Club domestic league appearances and goals as of 16:53, 29 July 2020 (UTC)

Sebastian José Colón (born 25 June 1998) is a Colombian footballer who currently plays as a midfielder for Marathón.

== Career statistics ==
=== Club ===
As of 29 July 2020.

Club	Season	League			Cup		Continental		Other		Total	
Club	Season	Division	Apps	Goals	Apps	Goals	Apps	Goals	Apps	Goals	Apps	Goals
Real de Minas	2018–19	Liga Salva Vida	8	1	0	0	0	0	0	0	8	1
Marathón	2019–20	Liga Salva Vida	1	0	0	0	0	0	0	0	1	0
Career total			9	1	0	0	0	0	0	0	9	1
