= Óscar Munguía =

Honduran footballer (1991–2018)

Oscar Munguía
Personal information
- Full name: Oscar Seín Munguía Zelaya
- Date of birth: 6 July 1991
- Place of birth: La Ceiba, Honduras
- Date of death: 18 November 2018 (aged 27)
- Place of death: La Ceiba, Honduras
- Height: 1.83 m (6 ft 0 in)
- Position: Goalkeeper

Senior career*
Years	Team	Apps	(Gls)
–2013	Victoria		
2014–2016	Arsenal (Honduras)		
2016–2018	Vida	17	(0)
Total		17	(0)
- * Club domestic league appearances and goals

Oscar Seín Munguía Zelaya (6 July 1991 – 18 November 2018) was a Honduran footballer who played professionally in Honduras. He was shot in a hotel in his home town of La Ceiba on 18 November 2018, following an argument.

== Career statistics ==
=== Club ===
Club	Season	League			Cup		Continental		Other		Total	
Club	Season	Division	Apps	Goals	Apps	Goals	Apps	Goals	Apps	Goals	Apps	Goals
Vida	2016–17	Liga Salva-Vida	10	0	0	0	–		0	0	10	0
Vida	2017–18	Liga Salva-Vida	5	0	0	0	–		0	0	5	0
Vida	2018–19	Liga Salva-Vida	2	0	0	0	–		0	0	2	0
Career total			17	0	0	0	0	0	0	0	17	0
