= 2019 Honduran Cup =

President's Cup

Tournament details
- Country: Honduras
- Dates: Cancelled
- Teams: 64
- All statistics correct as of 11 December 2018.

The 2019 Honduran Cup was intended to be the 14th edition of the Honduran Cup and the fifth as Copa Presidente. The tournament was announced on 11 December 2018 and was scheduled to be played in the second semester of 2019, however, due to the tight schedule between league and international competitions, the tournament was never played.

Platense F.C. were the defending champions.
