= Jonathan Paz =

Honduran footballer (born 1995)

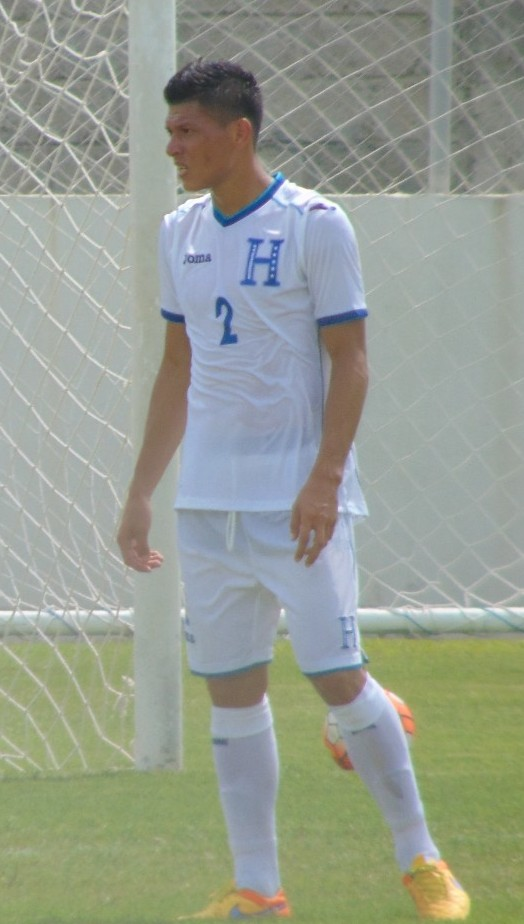
- Paz playing for Honduras U23

Personal information
- Full name: Jonathan Josué Paz Hernández
- Date of birth: 18 June 1995 (age 31)
- Place of birth: Tocoa, Honduras
- Height: 1.83 m (6 ft 0 in)
- Position: Defender

Team information
- Current team: Marathón
- Number: 27

Senior career*
Years	Team	Apps	(Gls)
2013–2017	Real Sociedad	89	(2)
2017–2026	Olimpia	110	(1)
2026–	Marathón	0	(0)

International career^{‡}
2015–2016	Honduras U23		
2020–	Honduras	1	(1)
- * Club domestic league appearances and goals as of 21 May 2021 (UTC) ‡ National team caps and goals as of 10 October 2020 (UTC)

Jonathan Josué Paz Hernández (born 18 June 1995) is a Honduran professional footballer for Liga Nacional club Marathón. He represented Honduras in the football competition at the 2016 Summer Olympics.

== International career ==
He made his national team debut on 10 October 2020 in a friendly against Nicaragua. He scored a goal in a 1–1 home draw.
