= Yerson Gutiérrez =

Colombian footballer (born 1994)

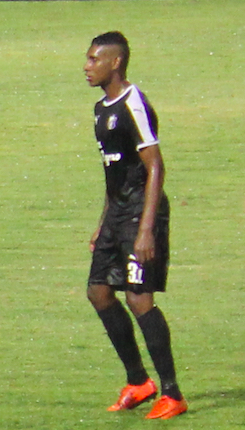
- Gutierrez playing with Honduras Progreso, 2018

Personal information
- Full name: Yerson Gutiérrez Cuenca
- Date of birth: 20 January 1994 (age 32)
- Place of birth: Florida, Colombia
- Height: 1.84 m (6 ft 0 in)
- Position: Forward

Team information
- Current team: Marathón
- Number: 31

Youth career
- –2013: América de Cali

Senior career*
Years	Team	Apps	(Gls)
2013–2016	América de Cali		
2017	Atlético	5	(0)
2017	Colón		
2018–2019	Honduras Progreso	33	(13)
2019–	Marathón	19	(4)
- * Club domestic league appearances and goals as of 16:53, 29 July 2020 (UTC)

Yerson Gutiérrez Cuenca (born 20 January 1994) is a Colombian footballer who currently plays as a forward for Marathón.

== Career statistics ==
=== Club ===
As of 29 July 2020.

Club	Season	League			Cup		Continental		Other		Total	
Club	Season	Division	Apps	Goals	Apps	Goals	Apps	Goals	Apps	Goals	Apps	Goals
América de Cali	2013	Categoría Primera B	–		4 (Note: Appearances in the Copa Colombia)	0	0	0	0	0	4	0
América de Cali	2014	Categoría Primera B	–		8	1	0	0	0	0	8	1
América de Cali	Total		0	0	12	1	0	0	0	0	12	1
Atlético	2017	Categoría Primera B	5	0	3	0	0	0	0	0	8	0
Honduras Progreso	2018–19	Liga Salva Vida	33	13	0	0	0	0	0	0	33	13
Marathón	2019–20	Liga Salva Vida	19	4	0	0	2 (Note: Appearances in the CONCACAF League)	0	0	0	21	4
Career total			57	17	15	1	2	0	0	0	74	18
