= Leandro Sosa (footballer, born 1994) =

Uruguayan footballer

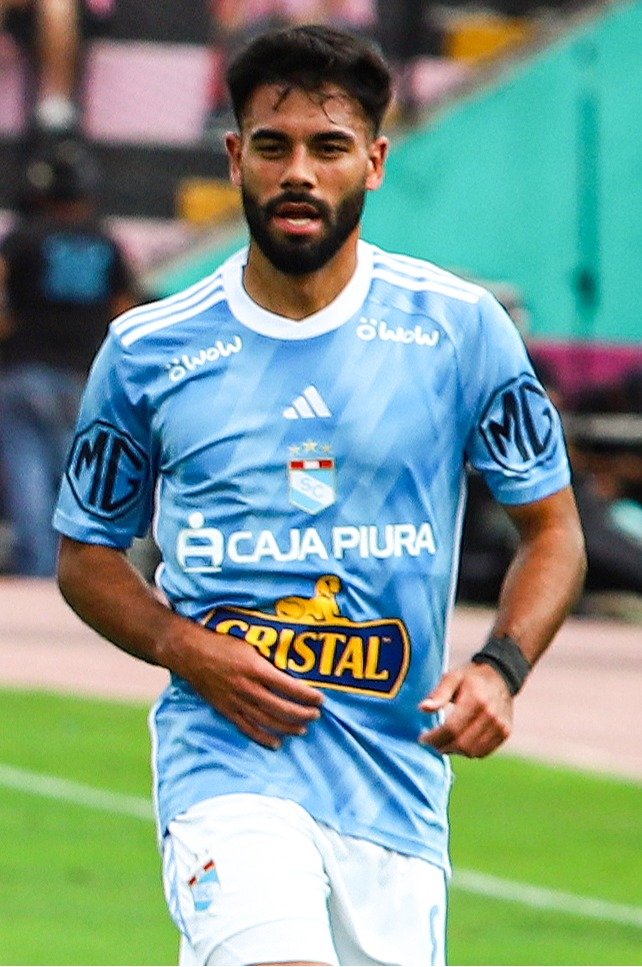

Personal information
- Full name: Leandro Sosa Toranza
- Date of birth: 24 June 1994 (age 32)
- Place of birth: Punta del Este, Uruguay
- Height: 1.71 m (5 ft 7 in)
- Position: Midfielder

Team information
- Current team: Sporting Cristal
- Number: 8

Senior career*
Years	Team	Apps	(Gls)
2012–2018	Atenas	99	(13)
2016	→ O'Higgins (loan)	21	(2)
2017	→ Racing (loan)	35	(4)
2018	Atlético Venezuela	14	(1)
2019	CD Olimpia	14	(1)
2019	C.A. Progreso	14	(1)
2020–2021	Ayacucho FC	52	(9)
2022-	Sporting Cristal	116	(16)
- * Club domestic league appearances and goals as of 1 September 2020

Leandro Sosa Toranza (born 24 June 1994) is a Uruguayan footballer who plays as a midfielder for Sporting Cristal.

== Career ==
=== Club ===
Sosa began his career in Uruguay with Uruguayan Segunda División club Atenas in 2012. He made 83 league appearances and scored 11 goals in four seasons for the club before being loaned out to Chilean Primera División side O'Higgins in 2016. He made his O'Higgins debut on 31 January in a goalless draw against Deportes Iquique. He returned to Atenas at the end of his loan spell, he scored 2 goals in 21 appearances in total for O'Higgins. In February 2017, Sosa joined Uruguayan Primera División side Racing.

== Career statistics ==
=== Club ===
As of 28 April 2023.

Club	Division	Season	League		Cup		Continental		Total	
Club	Division	Season	Apps	Goals	Apps	Goals	Apps	Goals	Apps	Goals
Atenas
Atenas	Uruguayan Segunda División	2012–13	22	0	0	0	0	0	22	0
Atenas	Uruguayan Segunda División	2013–14	26	5	0	0	0	0	26	5
Atenas	Uruguayan Primera División	2014–15	29	6	0	0	0	0	29	6
Atenas	Uruguayan Segunda División	2015–16	6	0	0	0	0	0	6	0
O'Higgins	Chilean Primera División	2015–16	7	1	0	0	2	0	9	1
O'Higgins	Chilean Primera División	2016–17	10	1	3	0	0	0	13	1
O'Higgins	Total		17	2	3	0	2	0	22	2
Racing	Uruguayan Primera División	2017	35	4	0	0	0	0	35	4
Racing	Total		35	4	0	0	0	0	35	4
Atenas	Uruguayan Primera División	2018	18	2	0	0	0	0	18	2
Atenas	Total		101	13	0	0	0	0	101	13
Atlético Venezuela	Venezuelan Primera División	2018	14	2	4	2	0	0	18	4
Atlético Venezuela	Total		14	2	4	2	0	0	18	4
CD Olimpia	Liga Nacional de Fútbol Profesional de Honduras	2018–19	14	1	0	0	0	0	14	1
CD Olimpia	Total		14	1	0	0	0	0	14	1
Progreso	Uruguayan Primera División	2019	14	1	0	0	0	0	14	1
Progreso	Total		14	1	0	0	0	0	14	1
Ayacucho	Peruvian Primera División	2020	29	6	0	0	0	0	29	6
Ayacucho	Peruvian Primera División	2021	23	3	3	0	2	1	28	4
Ayacucho	Total		52	9	3	0	2	1	57	10
Sporting Cristal	Peruvian Primera División	2022	38	5	0	0	6	0	44	5
Sporting Cristal	Peruvian Primera División	2023	23	5	0	0	10	0	33	5
Sporting Cristal	Peruvian Primera División	2024	21	2	0	0	2	0	21	2
Sporting Cristal	Total		82	12	0	0	18	0	98	12
Career total			308	42	10	2	24	1	359	47
