= Robert Lima (footballer) =

Uruguayan footballer and football manager (1972–2021)

Personal information
- Birth name: Robert Lima Fonseca
- Date of birth: 18 June 1972
- Place of birth: Melo, Uruguay
- Date of death: 17 June 2021 (aged 48)
- Height: 1.87 m (6 ft 2 in)
- Position: Defender

Senior career*
Years	Team	Apps	(Gls)
1992–1999	Peñarol		
1999–2000	Chacarita Juniors		
2001	Club Olimpia		
2001–2002	Peñarol		
2003	Harbin Lange		
2004	Sporting Cristal		
2005	Shanghai The 9		
2006	Liverpool Montevideo		
2007	Durazno		
2008–2009	Cerro Largo		

International career
1996	Uruguay	1	(0)
- * Club domestic league appearances and goals

Robert Lima Fonseca (18 June 1972 – 17 June 2021) was an Uruguayan football player and manager. He played as a defender. He played for Peñarol, Chacarita and Sporting Cristal, among others. With Peñarol he became five times Primera División champion between 1993 and 1997. At the last club he played for, Cerro Largo, he became assistant coach. Being an assistant coach for several clubs between 2008 and 2017 he became manager of Juticalpa in 2019.

Lima died on 17 June 2021, aged 48.
