= Andrés Pineda =

Colombian footballer (born 1992)

Personal information
- Full name: Andrés Felipe Pineda Barajas
- Date of birth: 27 March 1992 (age 34)
- Place of birth: Villavicencio, Colombia
- Height: 1.90 m (6 ft 3 in)
- Position: Forward

Youth career
- Centauros Villavicencio
- 2009: Boca Juniors de Cali

Senior career*
Years	Team	Apps	(Gls)
2011–2012	La Equidad	0	(0)
2013–2015	Monagas		
2015	→ Millonarios (loan)	0	(0)
2019	Platense	8	(0)
2020	Llaneros	7	(0)
- * Club domestic league appearances and goals

Andrés Felipe Pineda Barajas (born 27 March 1992) is a retired Colombian footballer.

== Club career ==
Born in Villavicencio, Pineda began his career with local side Centauros Villavicencio, before joining Boca Juniors de Cali in 2009. After a year with Boca Juniors, he joined La Equidad, spending two years and making his debut under coach Alexis García in the Copa Colombia. Following García's departure from the club, the new manager did not favour Pineda, and he left for Venezuelan team Monagas, having been recommended by former Colombian footballer Enrique Braidy.

Following impressive performances with Monagas, he was scouted by Colombian Categoría Primera A side Millonarios, and joined on a half-season loan deal in July 2015. Growing up, Pineda had been a fan of the Bogotá-based club. Following the end of the 2015 season, he was not kept on by Millonarios.

Pineda appears to have taken a break from football following his departure from Millonarios, but in January 2019, he signed for Honduran side Platense. He started in a 4–2 penalty shoot-out loss to Marathón in the Honduran Supercup. He again returned to Colombia, signing with Categoría Primera B side Llaneros, and went on to make seven league appearances.

== Career statistics ==
=== Club ===
Appearances and goals by club, season and competition
Club	Season	League			Cup		Other		Total	
Club	Season	Division	Apps	Goals	Apps	Goals	Apps	Goals	Apps	Goals
Platense	2018–19	Liga Salva Vida	8	0	0	0	1 (Note: Appearances in the Honduran Supercup)	0	9	0
Llaneros	2020	Categoría Primera B	7	0	0	0	0	0	7	0
Career total			15	0	0	0	1	0	16	0
