= Kervin Arriaga =

Honduran footballer (born 1998)

Personal information
- Full name: Kervin Fabián Arriaga Villanueva
- Date of birth: 5 January 1998 (age 28)
- Place of birth: Puerto Cortés, Honduras
- Height: 1.91 m (6 ft 3 in)
- Position: Defensive midfielder

Team information
- Current team: AEK Athens
- Number: 16

Senior career*
Years	Team	Apps	(Gls)
2017–2019	Platense	65	(8)
2019–2022	Marathón	55	(11)
2022–2024	Minnesota United	57	(6)
2024–2025	Partizan	15	(0)
2025	→ Zaragoza (loan)	17	(1)
2025–2026	Levante	27	(3)
2026–	AEK Athens	3	(0)

International career^{‡}
2021	Honduras U23	4	(0)
2020–2026	Honduras	42	(4)
Medal record
Representing Honduras
Men's football
Pan American Games
Silver medal – second place	2019 Lima	Team competition
- * Club domestic league appearances and goals as of 20 September 2026 ‡ National team caps and goals as of 09:51, 23 January 2026 (UTC)

Kervin Fabián Arriaga Villanueva (born 5 January 1998) is a Honduran professional footballer who plays as a defensive midfielder for Super League Greece club AEK Athens.

== Club career ==
Arriaga made his debut for Platense F.C. on 5 February 2017 in a 3–1 win over Juticalpa F.C. in the Clausura tournament. He scored his first goal the following 12 April against C.D. Real Sociedad in a 1–1 draw.

On 23 July 2019, Arriaga signed with C.D. Marathón. He made his debut the following 17 August in the 1–0 victory against Lobos UPNFM. He scored his first goal on 28 September against F.C. Motagua in a 2–1 win.

On 16 February 2022, Arriaga signed a two-year deal with Major League Soccer side Minnesota United.

On 27 June 2024, Arriaga signed a three-year deal with Serbian Superliga side Partizan. On 9 January of the following year, he was loaned to Spanish side Real Zaragoza until the end of the season.

On 2 July 2025, Arriaga signed a three-year contract with La Liga side Levante UD. He made his debut for the club the following 14 September, coming on as a substitute for Pablo Martínez in a 2–2 home draw with Real Betis.

== International career ==
Arriaga made his senior national team debut on 10 October 2020 in a friendly against Nicaragua.

== Career statistics ==
=== Club ===
As of match played 31 May 2026

Appearances and goals by club, season and competition
Club	Season	League			National cup (Note: Includes U.S. Open Cup, Serbian Cup, Copa del Rey)		Continental		Other		Total	
Club	Season	Division	Apps	Goals	Apps	Goals	Apps	Goals	Apps	Goals	Apps	Goals
Platense	2016–17	Liga Nacional	5	1	—		—		—		5	1
Platense	2017–18	Liga Nacional	27	2	—		1 (Note: Appearance(s) in CONCACAF League)	0	—		28	2
Platense	2018–19	Liga Nacional	33	5	—		—		—		33	5
Platense	Total		65	8	—		—		—		66	8
Marathón	2019–20	Liga Nacional	23	4	—		0	0	—		23	4
Marathón	2020–21	Liga Nacional	24	5	—		3 (Note: Two appearances in CONCACAF Champions League, one appearance in CONCACAF League)	0	—		27	5
Marathón	2021–22	Liga Nacional	8	2	—		4	1	—		12	3
Marathón	Total		55	11	—		7	1	—		62	12
Minnesota United	2022	Major League Soccer	24	1	2	0	—		1 (Note: Appearance in MLS Cup playoffs)	0	27	1
Minnesota United	2023	Major League Soccer	20	2	3	0	—		2 (Note: Appearances in Leagues Cup)	0	25	2
Minnesota United	2024	Major League Soccer	13	3	—		—		—		13	3
Minnesota United	Total		57	6	5	0	—		3	0	65	6
Partizan	2024–25	Serbian SuperLiga	15	0	1	0	5 (Note: One appearance in UEFA Champions League, two appearances in UEFA Europa League, two appearances in UEFA Conference League)	0	—		21	0
Zaragoza (loan)	2024–25	Segunda División	17	1	—		—		—		17	1
Levante	2025–26	La Liga	27	3	1	0	—		—		28	3
Career total			236	29	7	0	13	1	3	0	259	30

=== International ===
As of match played 6 June 2026

Appearances and goals by national team and year
National team	Year	Apps	Goals
Honduras	2020	1	0
Honduras	2021	9	0
Honduras	2022	10	2
Honduras	2023	3	0
Honduras	2024	7	2
Honduras	2025	13	0
Honduras	2026	2	0
Total		45	4

Scores and results list Honduras' goal tally first, score column indicates score after each Arriaga goal.

List of international goals scored by Kervin Arriaga
No.	Date	Venue	Opponent	Score	Result	Competition
1	16 January 2022	DRV PNK Stadium, Fort Lauderdale, United States	Colombia	1–1	1–2	Friendly
2	13 June 2022	Estadio Olímpico Metropolitano, San Pedro Sula, Honduras	Canada	2–0	2–1	2022–23 CONCACAF Nations League A
3	9 June 2024	Bermuda National Stadium, Devonshire Parish, Bermuda	Bermuda	1–0	6–1	2026 FIFA World Cup qualification
4	6 September 2024	Estadio Nacional Chelato Uclés, Tegucigalpa, Honduras	Trinidad and Tobago	2–0	4–0	2024–25 CONCACAF Nations League A

== Honours ==
Platense

- Honduran Cup: 2018

Honduras U23

- Pan American Silver Medal: 2019
