= Delis Vargas =

Uruguayan footballer (born 1994)

Personal information
- Full name: Delis Matías Vargas Blanco
- Date of birth: 25 October 1994 (age 32)
- Place of birth: Tacuarembó, Uruguay
- Height: 1.85 m (6 ft 1 in)
- Position: Center-forward

Team information
- Current team: Albion

Youth career
- Tacuarembó
- Juventud

Senior career*
| Years | Team | Apps | (Gls) |
| 2015–2017 | Juventud | 39 | (6) |
| 2017–2018 | Cerro | 4 | (0) |
| 2018–2019 | Rampla Juniors | 35 | (3) |
| 2020 | Real España | 15 | (4) |
| 2021– | Albion | 4 | (0) |
- * Club domestic league appearances and goals as of 18:51, 13 July 2021 (UTC)

Delis Matías Vargas Blanco (born 25 October 1994) is a Uruguayan footballer who plays as a forward for Albion.
