= Esteban Espíndola =

Argentine footballer (born 1992)

Personal information
- Full name: Esteban Ezequiel Espíndola López
- Date of birth: 22 March 1992 (age 34)
- Place of birth: San Martín, Argentina
- Height: 1.78 m (5 ft 10 in)
- Position: Centre-back

Youth career
- River Plate

Senior career*
Years	Team	Apps	(Gls)
2013–2014	River Plate	0	(0)
2013–2014	→ Atlético de Rafaela (loan)	3	(0)
2014	Nueva Chicago	0	(0)
2015–2018	Belgrano	17	(0)
2017–2018	→ San Martín (loan)	15	(0)
2018	Olimpia	10	(0)
2019	Racing de Córdoba	6	(0)
2019–2020	Marathón	28	(3)
2020–2021	Saprissa	30	
2021–2022	Cobán Imperial	7	(0)

International career
2007	Argentina U15		
2009	Argentina U17	3	(1)
- * Club domestic league appearances and goals as of 07:26, 28 May 2021 (UTC)

Esteban Ezequiel Espíndola López (born 22 March 1992) is an Argentine professional footballer who plays as a centre-back.

== Club career ==
Espíndola began his career with Argentine Primera División club River Plate, appearing on the bench twice in the league prior to making his debut in the 2012–13 Copa Argentina against Estudiantes. In July 2013, Espíndola joined fellow top-flight team Atlético de Rafaela on loan. Over the course of the 2013–14 Argentine Primera División season he made just three appearances for Rafaela. 2014 saw him join Primera B Nacional's Nueva Chicago on a permanent deal, however he left less than a year later without making an appearance. In February 2015, Espíndola joined Primera División side Belgrano.

After twenty appearances in all competitions in his first three seasons with Belgrano, Espíndola was loaned out to Primera B Nacional team San Martín in August 2017. His campaign with the club ended with promotion to the top division. Olimpia of the Liga Nacional in Honduras completed the signing of Espíndola on 18 August 2018. He participated in fourteen fixtures for Olimpia, before terminating his contract in December. In January 2019, Espíndola agreed to sign for Racing de Córdoba in Argentina's Torneo Federal A. He suffered relegation with them. Espíndola then went back to Honduras with Marathón.

On 11 August 2019, Espíndola scored the first goal of his senior career during a 1–1 draw with former club Olimpia. After further strikes against Honduras Progreso and Real Sociedad, Espíndola switched Honduras for Costa Rica on 9 July 2020 by agreeing terms with Saprissa. He signed a one-year contract and received the shirt number five.

== International career ==
Espíndola has represented Argentina at U15 and U17 level, making three appearances for the latter at the 2009 FIFA U-17 World Cup in Nigeria. He scored in the aforementioned tournament, converting a penalty in a group stage match against Germany.

== Career statistics ==
As of 17 February 2021.

Club statistics
Club	Season	League			Cup		League Cup		Continental		Other		Total	
Club	Season	Division	Apps	Goals	Apps	Goals	Apps	Goals	Apps	Goals	Apps	Goals	Apps	Goals
River Plate	2012–13	Primera División	0	0	1	0	—		0	0	0	0	1	0
River Plate	2013–14	Primera División	0	0	0	0	—		0	0	0	0	0	0
River Plate	Total		0	0	1	0	—		0	0	0	0	1	0
Atlético de Rafaela (loan)	2013–14	Primera División	3	0	0	0	—		—		0	0	3	0
Nueva Chicago	2014	Primera B Nacional	0	0	0	0	—		—		0	0	0	0
Nueva Chicago	Total		0	0	0	0	—		—		0	0	0	0
Belgrano	2015	Primera División	4	0	0	0	—		0	0	0	0	4	0
Belgrano	2016	Primera División	2	0	0	0	—		—		0	0	2	0
Belgrano	2016–17	Primera División	11	0	3	0	—		0	0	0	0	14	0
Belgrano	2017–18	Primera División	0	0	0	0	—		—		0	0	0	0
Belgrano	Total		17	0	3	0	—		0	0	0	0	20	0
San Martín (loan)	2017–18	Primera B Nacional	15	0	0	0	—		—		2 (Note: Appearance(s) in the Primera B Nacional play-offs)	0	17	0
Olimpia	2018–19	Liga Nacional	10	0	0	0	—		—		4 (Note: Appearance(s) in the Liga Nacional play-offs)	0	14	0
Racing de Córdoba	2018–19	Torneo Federal A	6	0	—		—		—		0	0	6	0
Marathón	2019–20	Liga Nacional	28	3	0	0	—		2 (Note: Appearance(s) in the CONCACAF League)	0	2	0	32	3
Saprissa	2020–21	Liga FPD	18	2	—		—		0	0	0	0	18	2
Career total			96	5	4	0	—		2	0	8	0	110	5

== Honours ==
=== Club ===
River Plate

- U-20 Copa Libertadores: 2012

Saprissa

- Liga FPD: Clausura 2021
