= José Mendoza (Honduran footballer) =

Honduran footballer (born 1989)

Personal information
- Full name: José Alberto Mendoza Posas
- Date of birth: 21 July 1989 (age 37)
- Place of birth: Olanchito, Honduras
- Height: 1.84 m (6 ft 0 in)
- Position: Goalkeeper

Team information
- Current team: C.D. Olimpia

Youth career
- Platense

Senior career*
Years	Team	Apps	(Gls)
2010–2012	Platense		
2012–2013	Marathón	7	(0)
2013	Vida	9	(0)
2014–2016	Xelajú	96	(0)
2016	Estudiantes de Mérida	5	(0)
2017	Parrillas One	?	(?)
2017–2018	Juticalpa	26	(0)
2018	Platense	0	(0)
2019	Lobos UPNFM	12	(0)

International career
2009–2010	Honduras U20		
2012	Honduras U23	10	(0)
2012	Honduras	1	(0)
- * Club domestic league appearances and goals

José Alberto Mendoza Posas (born 21 July 1989), known as José Mendoza, is a Honduran footballer who play as goalkeeper for C.D. Olimpia.

== Club career ==
Mendoza started his career at Platense and joined Marathón in summer 2012.

== International career ==
Mendoza was called up by Emilio Umanzor to the Honduras U20 for the 2009 FIFA U-20 World Cup. On 30 December 2010, Mendoza was included by Juan de Dios Castillo in Honduras's 23-man squad for the 2011 Copa Centroamericana and he played at the 2012 Summer Olympics.

Mendoza made his senior debut for Honduras in an October 2012 FIFA World Cup qualification match against Canada, his only cap as of February 2013.

== Honours ==
Honduras

- Copa Centroamericana: 2011
