= Edwin Solano =

Honduran footballer (born 1996)

Personal information
- Full name: Edwin Solany Solano Martínez
- Date of birth: 25 January 1996 (age 30)
- Place of birth: La Ceiba, Honduras
- Height: 1.64 m (5 ft 5 in)
- Positions: Midfielder; winger

Team information
- Current team: Olimpia
- Number: 30

Senior career*
Years	Team	Apps	(Gls)
2016	Angostura	11	(3)
2017	Gimnástico	0	(0)
2017	Comayagua	0	(0)
2017–2022	Marathón	134	(25)
2023–2026	Olimpia	88	(11)
2026–	Platense	17	(7)

International career^{‡}
2019–	Honduras	10	(2)
- * Club domestic league appearances and goals as of 14 July 2021 ‡ National team caps and goals as of 28 September 2022

Edwin Solany Solano Martínez (born 25 January 1996) is a Honduran professional footballer who plays as a midfielder and winger for Platense and the Honduras national team.

== Career ==
In 2018, Solano signed for Honduran top flight side Marathón after playing in the Venezuelan and Honduran second divisions.

== Personal life ==
Solano is the older brother of the footballer Julián Martínez.

== Career statistics ==
=== Club ===
As of 10 March 2024

Club	Division	Season	League		Cup		Continental		Total	
Club	Division	Season	Apps	Goals	Apps	Goals	Apps	Goals	Apps	Goals
Angostura	Venezuelan Segunda División	2016	11	3	1	0	–		12	3
Marathón	Liga Nacional de Fútbol Profesional de Honduras	2017-18	3	0	–		–		3	0
Marathón	Liga Nacional de Fútbol Profesional de Honduras	2018-19	27	3	–		2	0	29	3
Marathón	Liga Nacional de Fútbol Profesional de Honduras	2019-20	31	6	–		2	1	33	7
Marathón	Liga Nacional de Fútbol Profesional de Honduras	2020-21	31	7	–		5	1	36	8
Marathón	Liga Nacional de Fútbol Profesional de Honduras	2021-22	34	8	–		4	0	38	8
Marathón	Liga Nacional de Fútbol Profesional de Honduras	2022-23	8	1	–		–		8	1
Marathón	Total		134	25	0	0	13	2	147	27
Olimpia	Liga Nacional de Fútbol Profesional de Honduras	2022-23	16	1	–		1	0	17	1
Olimpia	Liga Nacional de Fútbol Profesional de Honduras	2023-24	29	6	–		4	0	33	6
Olimpia	Total		45	7	0	0	5	0	50	7
Career total			190	35	1	0	18	2	209	37

== International career ==
List of international goals scored by Edwin Solano
No.	Date	Venue	Opponent	Score	Result	Competition
1	14 July 2021	BBVA Stadium, Houston, United States	Grenada	2-0	4-0	2021 CONCACAF Gold Cup
2	27 September 2022	BBVA Stadium, Houston, United States	Guatemala	2-1	2-1	Friendly
