= Ángel Tejeda =

Honduran footballer (born 1991)

Ángel Tejada
Personal information
- Full name: Ángel Gabriel Tejada Escobar
- Date of birth: 1 June 1991 (age 35)
- Place of birth: El Progreso, Honduras
- Height: 1.87 m (6 ft 2 in)
- Position: Forward

Team information
- Current team: Olancho FC
- Number: 9

Senior career*
Years	Team	Apps	(Gls)
2012–2014	Choloma	19	(1)
2014–2016	Honduras Progreso	88	(37)
2017–2019	Real España	96	(26)
2019	Pérez Zeledón	12	(1)
2020–2021	Real España	18	(6)
2021–2022	Vida	35	(16)
2022	Motagua	32	(8)
2023	Alajuelense	24	(3)
2023–	Olancho FC	4	(1)

International career^{‡}
2015–2022	Honduras	11	(1)
- * Club domestic league appearances and goals as of 06:07, 3 September 2023 (UTC) ‡ National team caps and goals as of 14 November 2025

Ángel Gabriel Tejada Escobar (born 1 June 1991) is a Honduran professional footballer who plays as a forward for Olancho FC.

List of international goals scored by Angel Tejeda
No.	Date	Venue	Opponent	Score	Result	Competition
Example	March 30, 2022	Independence Park, Kingston, Jamaica	Jamaica	1-0	1-2	2022 FIFA World Cup qualification
