= Franco Güity =

Honduran football player (born 1987)

Personal information
- Full name: Franco Danilo Güity Félix
- Date of birth: 5 December 1987 (age 38)
- Place of birth: Santa Rosa de Aguan, Honduras
- Height: 1.76 m (5 ft 9 in)
- Position: Forward

Senior career*
Years	Team	Apps	(Gls)
2009–2010	Hispano	30	(2)
2010–2016	Olimpia	16	(2)
2011–2012	→ Atlético Choloma	32	(9)
2012–2014	→ Real España	33	(3)
2015	→ Victoria	17	(2)
2015–2016	→ Vida	28	(12)
2017–2018	Juticalpa	34	(12)
2019	Lobos UPNFM	31	(22)
2020	Al-Nojoom	8	(5)
2020–2021	Bisha	10	(8)
- * Club domestic league appearances and goals as of 31 December 2019

Franco Danilo Güity Félix (born 5 December 1987) is a Honduran footballer who plays as a forward.
