= Estadio Emilio Williams Agasse =

Soccer stadium in Choluteca, Honduras

Coordinates: 13.29540°N 87.14910°W

- Interactive map of Estadio Emilio Williams Agasse
- Location: Choluteca, Honduras
- Owner: Municipality of Choluteca
- Capacity: 8,000
- Surface: Artificial turf
- Field size: 105 x 68

Construction
- Groundbreaking: 2016
- Opened: 8 September 2017
- Cost: L. 75,000,000.00

Tenants
- Broncos del Sur F.C. (2017–?); Lobos UPNFM (2018–)

The Estadio Emilio Williams Agasse is a football stadium in Choluteca, Honduras. It has a seating capacity of 8 000 and it host the home games for Lobos UPNFM. in the Honduran Liga Nacional .

== History ==
The stadium was named after businessman Abraham Emilio Williams, who had been recently assassinated in Choluteca. The stadium was inaugurated on 8 September 2017 and the first two games were played a day after the in a double header where Broncos del Sur F.C. hosted F.C. Municipal Valencia for a Liga de Ascenso encounter, followed by the Honduran Superclásico as the primetime match.

== Events ==
| Competition | Years |
|---|---|
| UNCAF U-17 Interclub Cup | 2019 |
