= Mario Martínez (footballer, born 1989) =

Honduran footballer

Personal information
- Full name: Mario Roberto Martínez Hernández
- Date of birth: 30 July 1989 (age 37)
- Place of birth: San Pedro Sula, Honduras
- Height: 1.73 m (5 ft 8 in)
- Position: Attacking midfielder

Youth career
- 2001–2006: Real España

Senior career*
| Years | Team | Apps | (Gls) |
| 2006–2016 | Real España | 58 | (18) |
| 2009 | → Vålerenga (loan) | 2 | (0) |
| 2010 | → Anderlecht (loan) | 0 | (0) |
| 2012–2013 | → Seattle Sounders FC (loan) | 13 | (1) |
| 2014 | → Barcelona SC (loan) | 16 | (1) |
| 2015–2016 | → ENPPI (loan) | 20 | (2) |
| 2016–2017 | ENPPI | 25 | (4) |
| 2017–2018 | Real España | 66 | (15) |
| 2019–2022 | Marathón | 57 | (11) |
| 2021–2022 | → Real España (loan) | 29 | (6) |
| 2022–2024 | Olancho | 59 | (5) |
| 2024–2025 | Génesis | 25 | (1) |
| 2025 | Atlético Choloma | 8 | (1) |

International career
| 2008–2009 | Honduras U20 | 9 | (7) |
| 2008–2012 | Honduras U23 | 11 | (3) |
| 2010–2018 | Honduras | 71 | (5) |
- * Club domestic league appearances and goals as of 20:39, 25 July 2024 (UTC)

Mario Roberto Martínez Hernández (born 30 July 1989) is a Honduran footballer who plays as a midfielder. Born in San Pedro Sula, Martínez played for the Honduras national football team from 2010 to 2018.

== Club career ==
Martínez was spotted by Norwegian scouts during the tournament against Trinidad and Tobago and shortly after went on loan to Norwegian side, Vålerenga. He also travelled to Norway alongside U-20 teammate, Reinieri Mayorquín who went on loan to Aalesund. Martínez made his debut in Tippeligaen when Vålerenga lost 3–4 against Start on 3 May 2009, but were mostly playing for Vålerenga's reserve team in the Second Division. Martínez only got two appearances for Vålerenga, both coming on as a substitute. The same year, Martínez played for Honduras U-20 in the 2009 FIFA U-20 World Cup in Egypt, and was the team's best player in the 3–0 victory against Hungary U-20, where he scored two goals.

In January 2010, he joined the Belgian team RSC Anderlecht on a six-month loan-deal.

On 1 August 2012, Martínez joined MLS club Seattle Sounders FC on loan from Real España. His first training session in Seattle was 17 August 2012. He participated in a reserve league match with the Sounders on 19 August 2012 in a 3–2 win over the Los Angeles Galaxy reserves. His first goal for the Sounders won the Western Conference semi-final match against Real Salt Lake on 8 November 2012.

On 2014, Martinez was signed by Barcelona SC in Ecuador.

In 2017, Martinez returned to Honduran club, Real España.

== International career ==
On 4 September 2010, Martínez made his debut for the Honduras National Team in a match against El Salvador, where Honduras won 4–3 via penalty shootout due to a 2–2 tie in regular time. He assisted the first goal for Honduras, thus helping his team to the Copa Independencia. He was part of Honduras's team at the 2012 Summer Olympics.

== Career statistics ==
=== International ===
Appearances and goals by national team and year
| National team | Year | Apps | Goals |
|---|---|---|---|
| Honduras | 2010 | 6 | 0 |
| Honduras | 2011 | 11 | 1 |
| Honduras | 2012 | 5 | 2 |
| Honduras | 2013 | 12 | 0 |
| Honduras | 2014 | 10 | 0 |
| Honduras | 2015 | 15 | 1 |
| Honduras | 2016 | 5 | 1 |
| Honduras | 2017 | 6 | 0 |
| Honduras | 2018 | 1 | 0 |
| Total | | 71 | 5 |

Scores and results list Honduras's goal tally first, score column indicates score after each Martínez goal.

List of international goals scored by Mario Martínez
| No. | Date | Venue | Opponent | Score | Result | Competition |
|---|---|---|---|---|---|---|
| 1 | 11 October 2011 | Estadio Nilmo Edwards, La Ceiba, Honduras | Jamaica | 2–1 | 2–1 | Friendly |
| 2 | 16 October 2012 | Estadio Olímpico Metropolitano, San Pedro Sula, Honduras | Canada | 4–0 | 8–1 | 2014 FIFA World Cup qualification |
| 3 | 16 October 2012 | Estadio Olímpico Metropolitano, San Pedro Sula, Honduras | Canada | 6–0 | 8–1 | 2014 FIFA World Cup qualification |
| 4 | 31 May 2015 | Robert F. Kennedy Memorial Stadium, Washington, D.C., United States | El Salvador | 1–0 | 2–0 | Friendly |
| 5 | 2 September 2016 | Estadio Olímpico Metropolitano, San Pedro Sula, Honduras | Canada | 1–1 | 2–1 | 2018 FIFA World Cup qualification |

== Honours ==
=== Real España ===
- Honduran Liga Nacional (1): 2006–07

=== Anderlecht ===
- Belgian Pro League (1): 2009–10
