= 2021–22 F.C. Motagua season =

Motagua
2021–22 season
- Chairman: Eduardo Atala
- Managers: Diego Vásquez; César Obando; Hernán Medina
- Stadium: Estadio Nacional
- Apertura: Semifinalist
- Clausura: Winners
- CONCACAF League: Finalist
- CONCACAF Champions League: Round of 16
- Top goalscorer: League: Moreira (13); All: Moreira (17)
Home colours	Away colours	Third colours
- All statistics correct as of 29 May 2022.

The 2021–22 season was F.C. Motagua's 75th season in existence and the club's 56th consecutive season in the top fight of Honduran football. In addition to the domestic league, the club also competed in the 2021 CONCACAF League and the 2022 CONCACAF Champions League.

== Overview ==
Coach Diego Vásquez renewed his contract for one year and lead the team for his 16th consecutive tournament. Due to poor results in both domestic and international fronts, he was sacked during the Clausura tournament. He broke a league record of 350 consecutive games as manager. He was temporarily recplaced by interim coach and former star César Obando and subsequently by Argentinian manager Hernán Medina, who managed to win the Clausura title.

== Kits ==
The 2021–22 home, away and third kits were published on 15 July.

Manufacturer		Main sponsor	
Joma		Pepsi	
Home	Away	Alternative	Goalkeeper

== Players ==
=== Transfers in ===
Player	Contract date	Moving from
(Honduras) Carlos Meléndez	21 May 2021	(Honduras) Vida
(Honduras) Carlos Mejía	11 July 2021	(Mexico) Pumas Tabasco
(Honduras) Jason Sánchez	22 July 2021	(Honduras) UPNFM
(Honduras) Alex Bahr	7 August 2021	Free agent
(Argentina) Diego Auzqui	10 August 2021	(Argentina) Sacachispas
(Honduras) Ángel Tejeda	5 January 2022	(Honduras) Vida
(Argentina) Lucas Baldunciel	14 January 2022	(Bolivia) Real Tomayapo
(Argentina) Franco Olego	16 January 2022	(Argentina) Olimpo
(Honduras) Denil Maldonado	8 February 2022	(Chile) Everton

=== Transfers out ===
Player	Released date	Moving to
(Honduras) Sergio Peña	4 June 2021	(Honduras) Vida
(Honduras) Bayron Méndez	4 June 2021	TBD
(Honduras) Reinieri Mayorquín	7 June 2021	(Honduras) Marathón
(Honduras) Elmer Güity	22 June 2021	(Bosnia and Herzegovina) Tuzla City
(Honduras) Juan Montes	28 June 2021	(Honduras) Vida
(Honduras) Carlos Fernández	11 December 2021	(Mexico) Venados
(Argentina) Gonzalo Klusener	16 December 2021	(Argentina) Atlanta
(Argentina) Matías Galvaliz	17 December 2021	(Guatemala) Guastatoya
(Honduras) Marco Vega	7 January 2022	(Honduras) Victoria
(Honduras) Kevin López	11 January 2022	(Guatemala) Comunicaciones

=== Squad ===
- Statistics as of 29 May 2022
- Only league matches into account

No.	Pos.	Player name	Date of birth and age	Games played			Goals scored		
				< 20/21	21/22	Total	< 20/21	21/22	Total
1	GK	(Honduras) Hugo Caballero	5 January 1997 (aged 24)	1	0	1	0	0	0
2	DF	(Honduras) Denil Maldonado	25 May 1998 (aged 23)	60	20	80	2	1	3
3	DF	(Honduras) Carlos Meléndez	8 December 1997 (aged 23)	0	15	15	0	3	3
4	MF	(Honduras) Carlos Mejía	19 February 2000 (aged 21)	0	24	24	0	4	4
5	DF	(Honduras) Marcelo Pereira	27 May 1995 (aged 26)	149	32	181	9	2	11
6	MF	(Honduras) Jason Sánchez	5 July 1998 (aged 22)	0	9	9	0	0	0
7	MF	(Honduras) Iván López	5 October 1990 (aged 30)	17	39	56	3	6	9
8	MF	(Honduras) Walter Martínez	26 March 1991 (aged 30)	140	18	158	13	3	16
9	FW	(Argentina) Gonzalo Klusener	21 October 1983 (aged 37)	46	18	64	16	4	20
9	FW	(Argentina) Franco Olego	4 May 1987 (aged 34)	0	13	13	0	2	2
10	MF	(Argentina) Matías Galvaliz	6 June 1989 (aged 32)	97	14	111	8	0	8
11	FW	(Honduras) Marco Vega	14 April 1987 (aged 34)	139	10	149	28	3	31
11	FW	(Honduras) Ángel Tejeda	1 June 1991 (aged 30)	0	18	18	0	2	2
12	MF	(Honduras) Raúl Santos	2 August 1992 (aged 28)	100	31	131	0	1	1
14	MF	(Honduras) Geovanni Bueso	12 April 2003 (aged 18)	0	2	2	0	0	0
15	MF	(Honduras) Juan Gómez	3 April 2000 (aged 21)	6	8	14	0	1	1
16	MF	(Honduras) Héctor Castellanos	28 December 1992 (aged 28)	182	21	203	2	0	2
17	DF	(Honduras) Wesly Decas	11 August 1999 (aged 21)	29	35	64	0	1	1
18	DF	(Honduras) Diego Rodríguez	6 November 1995 (aged 25)	6	16	22	0	1	1
19	GK	(Argentina) Jonathan Rougier	29 October 1987 (aged 33)	151	24	175	0	0	0
21	FW	(Paraguay) Roberto Moreira	6 May 1987 (aged 34)	110	42	152	50	13	63
22	MF	(Honduras) Jesse Moncada	5 January 1990 (aged 31)	10	33	43	1	3	4
23	MF	(Honduras) Juan Delgado	21 July 1992 (aged 28)	14	41	55	1	3	4
24	DF	(Honduras) Omar Elvir	28 September 1989 (aged 31)	305	29	334	12	0	12
25	GK	(Honduras) Marlon Licona	9 February 1991 (aged 30)	95	22	117	0	0	0
26	FW	(Honduras) Josué Villafranca	16 November 1999 (aged 21)	16	29	45	2	5	7
27	MF	(Honduras) Óscar García	16 May 1990 (aged 31)	9	17	26	1	1	2
28	DF	(Honduras) Alexander Bahr	17 February 2001 (aged 20)	0	0	0	0	0	0
29	FW	(Honduras) Carlos Fernández	17 February 1992 (aged 29)	18	16	34	2	0	2
30	DF	(Honduras) Osmar Gonzales	7 September 2000 (aged 20)	0	1	1	0	0	0
31	MF	(Argentina) Diego Auzqui	19 October 1989 (aged 31)	0	31	31	0	1	1
32	MF	(Honduras) Jonathan Núñez	26 November 2001 (aged 19)	23	23	46	1	0	1
33	DF	(Honduras) Albert Galindo	21 October 2001 (aged 19)	3	7	10	0	0	0
34	FW	(Honduras) Kevin López	3 February 1996 (aged 25)	188	15	203	37	10	47
34	MF	(Argentina) Lucas Baldunciel	22 March 1992 (aged 29)	0	12	12	0	0	0
35	DF	(Honduras) Cristopher Meléndez	25 November 1997 (aged 23)	67	24	91	2	2	4
40	MF	(Honduras) Yostin Obando	29 April 2004 (aged 17)	0	8	8	0	0	0
41	DF	(Honduras) Marvin Ávila	9 March 2002 (aged 19)	1	0	1	0	0	0
42	MF	(Honduras) Arnold Álvarez	19 January 2001 (aged 20)	2	0	2	0	0	0
44	MF	(Honduras) Danilo Palacios	11 June 2001 (aged 20)	2	0	2	0	0	0
45	MF	(Honduras) Ariel Flores	18 May 2001 (aged 20)	1	0	1	0	0	0
53	FW	(Honduras) Eduardo Arriola	4 January 2001 (aged 20)	1	0	1	0	0	0
54	FW	(Honduras) Andy Hernández	15 December 2003 (aged 17)	1	1	2	0	0	0
58	DF	(Honduras) Breyner Maradiaga	19 August 2003 (aged 17)	0	4	4	0	0	0
59	FW	(Honduras) José Oliva	16 May 2005 (aged 16)	0	2	2	0	0	0
Managers		(Argentina) Diego Vásquez	3 July 1971 (aged 49)	23 November 2013 – 27 February 2022					
Managers		(Honduras) César Obando (interim)	26 October 1969 (aged 51)	28 February 2022 – 24 March 2022					
Managers		(Argentina) Hernán Medina	5 September 1974 (aged 46)	24 March 2022 –					

=== Goalkeeper's action ===
- As of 29 May 2022

Goalkeeper	Years evaluated	Games	Goals	Per.
(Argentina) Jonathan Rougier	2017–2022	175	165	0.943
(Honduras) Hugo Caballero	2021–2022	1	1	1.000
(Honduras) Marlon Licona	2010–2017, 2018–2022	117	123	1.051

=== International caps ===
- As of 13 June 2022

This is a list of players that were playing for Motagua during the 2021–22 season and were called to represent Honduras at different international competitions.

Player	Team	Event	Caps	Goals
Héctor Castellanos	Adult	2022–23 CONCACAF Nations League	2	0
Wesly Decas	Adult	2022 FIFA World Cup qualification	3	0
Wesly Decas	Adult	2022–23 CONCACAF Nations League	2	0
Wesly Decas	Under-23	2020 Summer Olympics	3	0
Juan Delgado	Adult	2021 CONCACAF Gold Cup	2	0
Juan Delgado	Adult	2022 FIFA World Cup qualification	2	0
Juan Delgado	Adult	Friendly v Colombia	1	0
Omar Elvir	Adult	2022 FIFA World Cup qualification	4	0
Omar Elvir	Adult	2022–23 CONCACAF Nations League	2	0
Omar Elvir	Adult	Friendly v Colombia	1	0
Iván López	Adult	Friendly v Colombia	1	0
Kevin López	Adult	2021 CONCACAF Gold Cup	1	0
Denil Maldonado	Adult	2022 FIFA World Cup qualification	2	0
Denil Maldonado	Adult	2022–23 CONCACAF Nations League	3	0
Walter Martínez	Adult	2021 CONCACAF Gold Cup	1	0
Carlos Meléndez	Adult	2022 FIFA World Cup qualification	2	0
Carlos Meléndez	Adult	2022–23 CONCACAF Nations League	3	0
Carlos Meléndez	Under-23	2020 Summer Olympics	3	0
Cristopher Meléndez	Adult	2022 FIFA World Cup qualification	1	0
Cristopher Meléndez	Under-23	2020 Summer Olympics	3	0
Marcelo Pereira	Adult	2021 CONCACAF Gold Cup	1	0
Marcelo Pereira	Adult	2022 FIFA World Cup qualification	6	0
Marcelo Pereira	Adult	2022–23 CONCACAF Nations League	1	0
Diego Rodríguez	Adult	2021 CONCACAF Gold Cup	4	0
Diego Rodríguez	Adult	2022 FIFA World Cup qualification	6	0
Diego Rodríguez	Adult	Friendly v Colombia	1	0
Raúl Santos	Adult	2021 CONCACAF Gold Cup	2	0
Raúl Santos	Adult	2022 FIFA World Cup qualification	3	0
Raúl Santos	Adult	Friendly v Colombia	1	0
Ángel Tejeda	Adult	2022 FIFA World Cup qualification	3	1
Jonathan Núñez	Under-23	2020 Summer Olympics	1	0

== Results ==
All times are local CST unless stated otherwise

=== Preseason and friendlies ===
23 July 2021 Friendly	HUEFA Soccer League	0–9	Motagua	Baton Rouge, United States
20:00			Moreira; Vega; Galvaliz; Villafranca; Klusener; Bueso (o.g.) (o.g.)	Stadium: Olympia Stadium; Referee: Starting XI: 19 – Rougier; 6 – Sánchez; 7 – López; 10 – Galvaliz; 11 – Vega; 15 – Gómez; 21 – Moreira; 22 – Moncada; 24 – Elvir; 33 – Galindo; – Breyner

25 July 2021 Friendly	Florida Soccer Soldiers	1–4	Motagua	New Orleans, United States
19:00			Moreira; Klusener; Villafranca	Stadium: Pan American Stadium; Referee: Starting XI: 19 – Rougier; 6 – Sánchez; 7 – López; 9 – Klusener; 10 – Galvaliz; 15 – Gómez; 21 – Moreira; 22 – Moncada; 24 – Elvir; 33 – Galindo; – Breyner

30 July 2021 Friendly	Motagua	0–0	Olimpia	Charlotte, United States
19:30 EST				Stadium: Sportsplex at Matthews; Referee: Starting XI: 19 – Rougier; 6 – Sánchez; 9 – Klusener; 10 – Galvaliz; 11 – Vega; 12 – Santos; 15 – Gómez; 21 – Moreira; 22 – Moncada; 24 – Elvir; 33 – Galindo

1 August 2021 Friendly	Motagua	3–2	Olimpia	Harrison, United States
16:30 EST	Villafranca 35'; Klusener 42' 48'		17' Altamirano; 90' Arboleda	Stadium: Red Bull Arena; Referee: Starting XI: 19 – Rougier; 6 – Sánchez; 7 – López; 9 – Klusener; 10 – Galvaliz; 12 – Santos; 15 – Gómez; 21 – Moreira; 22 – Moncada; 24 – Elvir; 33 – Galindo

=== Apertura ===
8 August 2021 Week 1	Motagua	3–0	Platense	Tegucigalpa
16:00	Moreira 20'; Gómez 40'; Martínez 70'	Report		Stadium: Estadio Nacional; Referee: Jefferson Escobar Starting XI: 25 – Licona; 5 – Pereira; 6 – Sánchez; 9 – Klusener (substituted off) 73'; 10 – Galvaliz (substituted off) 68'; 15 – Gómez; 21 – Moreira; 22 – Moncada (substituted off) 67'; 24 – Elvir; 26 – Villafranca (substituted off) 57'; 33 – Galindo; Substitutes; 8 – Martínez (substituted on) 57'; 29 – Fernández (substituted on) 67'; 23 – Delgado (substituted on) 68'; 40 – Obando (substituted on) 73'
Note: Fans were allowed to access the stadium again since March 2020. Midfielder Juan Gómez scored his first goal for F.C. Motagua. Jason Sánchez and Yostin Obando made their professional debuts with the club. Obando is the son of former star César Obando.

11 August 2021 Week 2	Victoria	0–1	Motagua	La Ceiba
19:00		Report	36' Klusener	Stadium: Estadio Nilmo Edwards; Referee: Óscar Moncada Starting XI: 25 – Licona; 5 – Pereira; 6 – Sánchez; 8 – Martínez (substituted off) 68'; 9 – Klusener (substituted off) 68'; 10 – Galvaliz (substituted off) 87'; 15 – Gómez (substituted off) 81'; 21 – Moreira; 22 – Moncada (substituted off) 87'; 24 – Elvir; 33 – Galindo; Substitutes; 7 – López (substituted on) 68'; 35 – Meléndez (substituted on) 68'; 29 – Fernández (substituted on) 81'; 23 – Delgado (substituted on) 87'; 17 – Decas (substituted on) 87'
Note: This was the first encounter between these two clubs since 19 March 2016.

14 August 2021 Week 3	Marathón	2–0	Motagua	San Pedro Sula
15:00	Castillo 79'; Costly 90'	Report		Stadium: Estadio Yankel Rosenthal; Referee: Saíd Martínez Starting XI: 25 – Licona; 3 – Meléndez; 5 – Pereira; 6 – Sánchez (yellow card) 67' (yellow-red card) 90+5'; 7 – López (substituted off) 64'; 8 – Martínez (substituted off) 77'; 10 – Galvaliz (substituted off) 77'; 18 – Rodríguez; 21 – Moreira (substituted off) 76'; 29 – Fernández (substituted off) 76'; 35 – Meléndez; Substitutes; 34 – López (substituted on) 64'; 22 – Moncada (substituted on) 76'; 26 – Villafranca (substituted on) 76'; 23 – Delgado (substituted on) 77'; 17 – Decas (substituted on) 77'
Note: Defender Carlos Meléndez made his debut with F.C. Motagua wearing the #3 jersey. Midfielder Matías Galvaliz reached 100 league appearances with the club.

22 August 2021 Week 4	Motagua	3–2	Olimpia	Tegucigalpa
16:00	Pineda 8' (o.g.); Meléndez 67'; Martínez 80'	Report	25' Arboleda; 90+6' Hernández	Stadium: Estadio Nacional; Attendance: 5,544; Referee: Selvin Brown Starting XI: 19 – Rougier; 5 – Pereira; 10 – Galvaliz (substituted off) 57'; 15 – Gómez (substituted off) 87'; 21 – Moreira; 22 – Moncada (substituted off) 46'; 23 – Delgado (substituted off) 87'; 24 – Elvir; 26 – Villafranca (substituted off) 71'; 33 – Galindo; 35 – Meléndez; Substitutes; 29 – Fernández (substituted on) 46'; 8 – Martínez (substituted on) 57'; 31 – Auzqui (substituted on) 71'; 3 – Meléndez (substituted on) 87'; 12 – Santos (substituted on) 87'
Note: Argentinian midfielder Diego Auzqui made his debut for F.C. Motagua wearing the jersey #31.

25 August 2021 Week 5	Real Sociedad	3–3	Motagua	Tocoa
19:06	Gutiérrez 9'; Antúnez 44'; Rocha 78'	Report	50' Klusener; 74' Delgado; 90+5' Villafranca	Stadium: Estadio Francisco Martínez Durón; Referee: Luís Mejía Starting XI: 19 – Rougier; 8 – Martínez (substituted off) 46'; 9 – Klusener (substituted off) 64'; 12 – Santos; 15 – Gómez (substituted off) 46'; 21 – Moreira; 23 – Delgado; 24 – Elvir; 33 – Galindo (substituted off) 71'; 34 – López (substituted off) 71'; 35 – Meléndez; Substitutes; 31 – Auzqui (substituted on) 46'; 10 – Galvaliz (substituted on) 46'; 26 – Villafranca (substituted on) 64'; 29 – Fernández (substituted on) 71'; 18 – Rodríguez (substituted on) 71'
Note: This became the sixth straight undefeated game at this venue.

30 August 2021 Week 6	Motagua	0–0	UPNFM	Tegucigalpa
19:00		Report		Stadium: Estadio Nacional; Referee: Armando Castro Starting XI: 19 – Rougier; 3 – Meléndez; 8 – Martínez (substituted off) 46'; 9 – Klusener (substituted off) 63'; 17 – Decas; 23 – Delgado; 24 – Elvir; 26 – Villafranca (substituted off) 46'; 31 – Auzqui (substituted off) 54'; 34 – López (substituted off) 63'; 35 – Meléndez; Substitutes; 10 – Galvaliz (substituted on) 46'; 21 – Moreira (substituted on) 46'; 7 – López (substituted on) 54'; 29 – Fernández (substituted on) 63'; 11 – Vega (substituted on) 63'
Note: This game was pushed one day forward as the Estadio Nacional was being used as a COVID-19 vaccination site.

4 September 2021 Week 7	Honduras Progreso	0–3	Motagua	San Pedro Sula
19:00		Report	22' López; 48' 51' Vega	Stadium: Estadio General Francisco Morazán; Referee: Marvin Ortiz Starting XI: 19 – Rougier; 3 – Meléndez; 6 – Sánchez (substituted off) 69'; 11 – Vega (substituted off) 72'; 17 – Decas; 21 – Moreira; 23 – Delgado; 24 – Elvir; 31 – Auzqui (substituted off) 57'; 34 – López; 35 – Meléndez (substituted off) 72'; Substitutes; 14 – Bueso (substituted on) 57'; 10 – Galvaliz (substituted on) 69'; 7 – López (substituted on) 72'; 15 – Gómez (substituted on) 72'
Note: Youngster Geovanni Bueso made his official debut with the club wearing jersey #14.

11 September 2021 Week 8	Real España	2–1	Motagua	San Pedro Sula
18:00	Vuelto 57'; Rocca 90+4'	Report	55' Vega	Stadium: Estadio Olímpico Metropolitano; Attendance: 2,000; Referee: Selvin Brown Starting XI: 19 – Rougier; 3 – Meléndez; 8 – Martínez (substituted off) 71'; 11 – Vega (substituted off) 84'; 17 – Decas; 21 – Moreira (substituted off) 71'; 23 – Delgado; 24 – Elvir; 31 – Auzqui (substituted off) 84'; 34 – López (substituted off) 75'; 35 – Meléndez; Substitutes; 9 – Klusener (substituted on) 71' (yellow card) 86' (yellow-red card) 90'; 32 – Núñez (substituted on) 71'; 7 – López (substituted on) 75'; 4 – Mejía (substituted on) 84'; 26 – Villafranca (substituted on) 84'
Note: Defender Carlos Mejía made his official debut with the club wearing jersey #4.

16 September 2021 Week 9	Motagua	2–1	Vida	Danlí
16:00	Auzqui 19'; Pereira 81'	Report	36' Tejeda	Stadium: Estadio Marcelo Tinoco; Referee: Orlando Hernández Starting XI: 19 – Rougier; 5 – Pereira; 9 – Klusener (substituted off) 65'; 11 – Vega (substituted off) 65'; 15 – Gómez (substituted off) 48'; 17 – Decas; 18 – Rodríguez (substituted off) 48'; 23 – Delgado; 24 – Elvir; 31 – Auzqui; 34 – López (substituted off) 74'; Substitutes; 35 – Meléndez (substituted on) 48'; 8 – Martínez (substituted on) 48'; 7 – López (substituted on) 65'; 21 – Moreira (substituted on) 65'; 29 – Fernández (substituted on) 74'
Note: Argentinian midfielder Diego Auzqui scored his first goal for F.C. Motagua.

19 September 2021 Week 10	UPNFM	2–2	Motagua	Danlí
16:00	Mejía 53'; Róchez 62'	Report	45' I. López; 75' K. López	Stadium: Estadio Marcelo Tinoco; Attendance: 1,000; Referee: Jefferson Escobar Starting XI: 19 – Rougier; 3 – Meléndez; 5 – Pereira; 7 – López (substituted off) 65'; 9 – Klusener (substituted off) 57'; 12 – Santos (substituted off) 57'; 14 – Bueso (substituted off) 57'; 16 – Castellanos; 18 – Rodríguez (substituted off) 66'; 31 – Auzqui; 33 – Galindo; Substitutes; 29 – Fernández (substituted on) 57'; 26 – Villafranca (substituted on) 57'; 8 – Martínez (substituted on) 57'; 24 – Elvir (substituted on) 65'; 34 – López (substituted on) 66'

6 November 2021 Week 11	Olimpia	0–0	Motagua	Tegucigalpa
19:00		Report		Stadium: Estadio Nacional; Referee: Melvin Matamoros Starting XI: 19 – Rougier; 3 – Meléndez; 5 – Pereira; 7 – López (substituted off) 51'; 12 – Santos; 21 – Moreira (substituted off) 65'; 23 – Delgado; 24 – Elvir; 34 – López (substituted off) 65'; 35 – Meléndez (substituted off) 46'; 54 – Hernández (substituted off) 46'; Substitutes; 31 – Auzqui (substituted on) 46'; 18 – Rodríguez (substituted on) 46'; 9 – Klusener (substituted on) 51'; 22 – Moncada (substituted on) 65'; 26 – Villafranca (substituted on) 65'

3 October 2021 Week 12	Motagua	5–0	Victoria	Tegucigalpa
16:00	López 24' 33' 71'; Pereira 65'; Villafranca 82'	Report		Stadium: Estadio Nacional; Referee: Melvin Herrera Starting XI: 19 – Rougier; 5 – Pereira; 7 – López (substituted off) 72'; 11 – Vega (substituted off) 54'; 12 – Santos; 16 – Castellanos (substituted off) 83'; 17 – Decas; 18 – Rodríguez; 23 – Delgado; 34 – López (substituted off) 72'; 40 – Obando (substituted off) 54'; Substitutes; 9 – Klusener (substituted on) 54'; 59 – Oliva (substituted on) 54'; 4 – Mejía (substituted on) 72'; 26 – Villafranca (substituted on) 72'; 32 – Núñez (substituted on) 83'
Note: Kevin López completed his first ever hat-trick with F.C. Motagua. Forward José Oliva made his debut with the club.

9 October 2021 Week 13	Platense	2–3	Motagua	Puerto Cortés
19:00	Gutiérrez 66' (pen.); Aranda 87'	Report	2' Klusener; 31' I. López; 53' (pen.) K. López	Stadium: Estadio Excélsior; Referee: Orlando Hernández Starting XI: 19 – Rougier; 7 – López (substituted off) 73'; 9 – Klusener (substituted off) 73'; 12 – Santos; 16 – Castellanos (substituted off) 69'; 17 – Decas; 23 – Delgado (substituted off) 81'; 24 – Elvir; 31 – Auzqui (substituted off) 69'; 34 – López; 58 – Maradiaga; Substitutes; 22 – Moncada (substituted on) 69'; 32 – Núñez (substituted on) 69'; 26 – Villafranca (substituted on) 73'; 10 – Galvaliz (substituted on) 73'; 35 – Meléndez (substituted on) 81'

17 October 2021 Week 14	Motagua	2–1	Marathón	Tegucigalpa
16:00	Meléndez 36'; López 63'	Report	69' Solano	Stadium: Estadio Nacional; Referee: Jefferson Escobar Starting XI: 19 – Rougier; 3 – Meléndez; 7 – López (substituted off) 78'; 9 – Klusener (substituted off) 64'; 12 – Santos; 16 – Castellanos (substituted off) 56'; 17 – Decas; 23 – Delgado; 24 – Elvir; 31 – Auzqui (substituted off) 63'; 34 – López (substituted off) 78'; Substitutes; 32 – Núñez (substituted on) 56'; 10 – Galvaliz (substituted on) 63'; 21 – Moreira (substituted on) 64'; 29 – Fernández (substituted on) 78'; 22 – Moncada (substituted on) 78'
Note: Defender Carlos Meléndez scored his first goal with the club.

24 October 2021 Week 15	Motagua	5–1	Real Sociedad	Tegucigalpa
16:00	Meléndez 9'; López 14'; Mejía 67'; Delgado 70'; Rodríguez 86'	Report	82' Figueroa	Stadium: Estadio Nacional; Referee: José Valladares Starting XI: 19 – Rougier; 3 – Meléndez; 7 – López (substituted off) 46'; 9 – Klusener; 10 – Galvaliz (substituted off) 46'; 17 – Decas; 23 – Delgado; 24 – Elvir (substituted off) 64'; 29 – Fernández (substituted off) 61'; 31 – Auzqui (substituted off) 46'; 58 – Maradiaga; Substitutes; 11 – Vega (substituted on) 46'; 27 – García (substituted on) 46'; 21 – Moreira (substituted on) 46'; 4 – Mejía (substituted on) 61'; 18 – Rodríguez (substituted on) 64'
Note: Midfielder Carlos Mejía and defender Diego Rodríguez scored their first goals with F.C. Motagua.

27 October 2021 Week 16	Vida	1–1	Motagua	La Ceiba
19:15	Palma 32'	Report	45' Klusener	Stadium: Estadio Nilmo Edwards; Referee: Jefferson Escobar Starting XI: 19 – Rougier; 3 – Meléndez; 5 – Pereira; 7 – López (substituted off) 83'; 9 – Klusener (substituted off) 64'; 17 – Decas; 23 – Delgado; 24 – Elvir; 29 – Fernández (substituted off) 71'; 31 – Auzqui (substituted off) 64'; 35 – Meléndez (substituted off) 84'; Substitutes; 10 – Galvaliz (substituted on) 64'; 11 – Vega (substituted on) 64'; 22 – Moncada (substituted on) 71'; 4 – Mejía (substituted on) 83'; 6 – Sánchez (substituted on) 84'

30 October 2021 Week 17	Motagua	0–1	Real España	Tegucigalpa
19:00		Report	90+5' Rocca	Stadium: Estadio Nacional; Referee: Óscar Moncada Starting XI: 19 – Rougier; 3 – Meléndez; 5 – Pereira; 7 – López (substituted off) 67'; 11 – Vega (substituted off) 57'; 17 – Decas; 23 – Delgado; 24 – Elvir; 27 – García (substituted off) 46'; 31 – Auzqui (substituted off) 57'; 59 – Oliva (substituted off) 30'; Substitutes; 29 – Fernández (substituted on) 30'; 35 – Meléndez (substituted on) 46'; 9 – Klusener (substituted on) 57'; 21 – Moreira (substituted on) 57'; 4 – Mejía (substituted on) 67'

9 November 2021 Week 18	Motagua	3–2	Honduras Progreso	Tegucigalpa
19:00	Moncada 9'; Moreira 21'; Villafranca 59'	Report	34' (o.g.) Santos; 70' Sacaza	Stadium: Estadio Nacional; Referee: Saíd Martínez Starting XI: 25 – Licona; 10 – Galvaliz (substituted off) 46'; 12 – Santos; 15 – Gómez; 16 – Castellanos; 17 – Decas; 21 – Moreira (substituted off) 59'; 22 – Moncada (substituted off) 69'; 26 – Villafranca (substituted off) 69'; 31 – Auzqui (substituted off) 87'; 58 – Maradiaga; Substitutes; 32 – Núñez (substituted on) 46'; 29 – Fernández (substituted on) 59'; 4 – Mejía (substituted on) 69'; 9 – Klusener (substituted on) 69'; 27 – García (substituted on) 87'
Note: F.C. Motagua finished the regular season in 4th place for the 13th time on their history.

18 November 2021 Play-offs	UPNFM	1–2	Motagua	Danlí
19:05	Ramírez 90+7' (pen.)	Report	50' 57' López	Stadium: Estadio Marcelo Tinoco; Referee: Nelson Salgado Starting XI: 19 – Rougier; 5 – Pereira; 7 – López (substituted off) 81'; 9 – Klusener (substituted off) 67'; 12 – Santos; 16 – Castellanos (substituted off) 87'; 17 – Decas; 18 – Rodríguez; 23 – Delgado; 31 – Auzqui (substituted off) 88'; 34 – López (substituted off) 87'; Substitutes; 21 – Moreira (substituted on) 67'; 11 – Vega (substituted on) 81'; 35 – Meléndez (substituted on) 87'; 22 – Moncada (substituted on) 87'; 29 – Fernández (substituted on) 88'
Note: Forward Kevin López scored twice and reached 200 league games playing for F.C. Motagua.

20 November 2021 Play-offs	Motagua	3–1	UPNFM	Tegucigalpa
18:10	López 1'; Moreira 37'; Villafranca 79'	Report	15' Mejía	Stadium: Estadio Nacional; Referee: Luís Mejía Starting XI: 19 – Rougier; 3 – Meléndez; 5 – Pereira; 7 – López (substituted off) 60'; 12 – Santos; 16 – Castellanos (substituted off) 64'; 21 – Moreira; 23 – Delgado (substituted off) 73'; 24 – Elvir; 31 – Auzqui (substituted off) 73'; 34 – López (substituted off) 60'; Substitutes; 22 – Moncada (substituted on) 60'; 26 – Villafranca (substituted on) 60'; 10 – Galvaliz (substituted on) 64'; 4 – Mejía (substituted on) 73'; 6 – Sánchez (substituted on) 73'
Note: With a 5–2 win on aggregate, F.C. Motagua qualified to their 13th straight semifinal stage, and their 31st overall.

4 December 2021 Semifinals	Motagua	1–1	Real España	Tegucigalpa
19:00	García 90+4' (o.g.)	Report	31' García	Stadium: Estadio Nacional; Referee: Selvin Brown Starting XI: 19 – Rougier; 3 – Meléndez; 5 – Pereira; 7 – López (substituted off) 58'; 9 – Klusener (substituted off) 46'; 10 – Galvaliz (substituted off) 46'; 12 – Santos; 23 – Delgado; 24 – Elvir (substituted off) 69'; 31 – Auzqui; 34 – López (substituted off) 58'; Substitutes; 26 – Villafranca (substituted on) 46'; 21 – Moreira (substituted on) 46'; 29 – Fernández (substituted on) 58'; 22 – Moncada (substituted on) 58'; 18 – Rodríguez (substituted on) 69'
Note: This is the fifth time in history these two sides face in a semifinal stage, having won two each in the previous four.

11 December 2021 Semifinals	Real España	2–0	Motagua	San Pedro Sula
19:00	Rocca 61'; Pereira 64' (o.g.)	Report		Stadium: Estadio General Francisco Morazán; Referee: Óscar Moncada Starting XI: 19 – Rougier; 5 – Pereira; 11 – Vega (substituted off) 58'; 17 – Decas; 18 – Rodríguez; 22 – Moncada (substituted off) 66'; 26 – Villafranca (substituted off) 58'; 27 – García (substituted off) 46'; 29 – Fernández (substituted off) 46'; 32 – Núñez; 35 – Meléndez; Substitutes; 31 – Auzqui (substituted on) 46'; 34 – López (substituted on) 46'; 9 – Klusener (substituted on) 58'; 21 – Moreira (substituted on) 58'; 7 – López (substituted on) 66'
Note: With a 1–3 loss on aggregate, F.C. Motagua failed in their journey to their 18th league title.

=== Clausura ===
19 January 2022 Week 1	Honduras Progreso	2–1	Motagua	El Progreso
19:15	Heráldez 54'; Guevara 90+2'	Report	3' Moreira	Stadium: Estadio Humberto Micheletti; Referee: Héctor Rodríguez Starting XI: 19 – Rougier; 6 – Sánchez; 7 – López (substituted off) 64'; 11 – Tejeda (substituted off) 64'; 12 – Santos; 21 – Moreira (substituted off) 81'; 23 – Delgado; 24 – Elvir; 31 – Auzqui (substituted off) 77'; 33 – Galindo; 58 – Maradiaga; Substitutes; 18 – Rodríguez (substituted on) 64'; 9 – Olego (substituted on) 64'; 40 – Obando (substituted on) 77'; 26 – Villafranca (substituted on) 81'
Note: A late goal on injury time, prevented F.C. Motagua to start the Clausura tournament with points. Forwards Ángel Tejeda and Franco Olego made their debuts for the club wearing jerseys 11 and 9 respectively.

23 January 2022 Week 2	Motagua	0–0	Vida	Danlí
16:00		Report		Stadium: Estadio Marcelo Tinoco; Referee: Álex Morazán Starting XI: 19 – Rougier; 7 – López (substituted off) 46'; 9 – Olego (substituted off) 46'; 11 – Tejeda (substituted off) 72'; 12 – Santos (substituted off) 90+4'; 17 – Decas; 21 – Moreira; 23 – Delgado; 24 – Elvir; 30 – Gonzales; 31 – Auzqui (substituted off) 81'; Substitutes; 18 – Rodríguez (substituted on) 46'; 22 – Moncada (substituted on) 46'; 26 – Villafranca (substituted on) 72'; 27 – García (substituted on) 81'; 33 – Galindo (substituted on) 90+4'
Note: Defender Osmar Gonzales made his debut with the club with jersey #30. Still win-less as of week 2 for the first time since 2017.

5 February 2022 Week 3	Real España	1–2	Motagua	San Pedro Sula
19:00	Denis 16'	Report	5' Meléndez; 20' Tejeda	Stadium: Estadio General Francisco Morazán; Referee: Óscar Moncada Starting XI: 19 – Rougier; 3 – Meléndez (substituted off) 46'; 5 – Pereira; 11 – Tejeda (substituted off) 80'; 12 – Santos; 17 – Decas; 21 – Moreira; 22 – Moncada (substituted off) 90+3'; 31 – Auzqui (substituted off) 67'; 32 – Núñez; 34 – Baldunciel; Substitutes; 18 – Rodríguez (substituted on) 46'; 24 – Elvir (substituted on) 67'; 26 – Villafranca (substituted on) 80'; 23 – Delgado (substituted on) 90+3'
Note: Argentinian midfielder Lucas Baldunciel made his debit with jersey #34. Forward Tejeda scored his first goal with F.C. Motagua.

8 February 2022 Week 4	Motagua	1–0	Victoria	Danlí
15:00	Olego 89'	Report		Stadium: Estadio Marcelo Tinoco; Referee: Saíd Martínez Starting XI: 19 – Rougier; 5 – Pereira; 11 – Tejeda; 12 – Santos; 17 – Decas (substituted off) 46'; 21 – Moreira (substituted off) 59'; 23 – Delgado (substituted off) 46'; 24 – Elvir; 31 – Auzqui (substituted off) 86'; 32 – Núñez; 34 – Baldunciel (substituted off) 68'; Substitutes; 18 – Rodríguez (substituted on) 46'; 7 – López (substituted on) 46'; 9 – Olego (substituted on) 59'; 22 – Moncada (substituted on) 68'; 4 – Mejía (substituted on) 86'
Note: Forward Franco Olego scored his first goal for the team.

12 February 2022 Week 5	Olimpia	1–1	Motagua	San Pedro Sula
19:00	Velásquez 86'	Report	12' Moreira	Stadium: Estadio General Francisco Morazán; Referee: Nelson Salgado Starting XI: 25 – Licona; 2 – Maldonado; 5 – Pereira; 11 – Tejeda (substituted off) 84'; 12 – Santos; 21 – Moreira (substituted off) 84'; 22 – Moncada (substituted off) 80'; 23 – Delgado; 24 – Elvir; 32 – Núñez (substituted off) 70'; 34 – Baldunciel (substituted off) 80'; Substitutes; 18 – Rodríguez (substituted on) 70'; 7 – López (substituted on) 80'; 6 – Sánchez (substituted on) 80'; 9 – Olego (substituted on) 84'; 26 – Villafranca (substituted on) 84'
Note: Goalkeeper Marlon Licona reached 100 league games with F.C. Motagua.

20 February 2022 Week 6	UPNFM	0–0	Motagua	Danlí
16:00		Report		Stadium: Estadio Marcelo Tinoco; Referee: Orlando Hernández Starting XI: 19 – Rougier; 2 – Maldonado; 4 – Mejía (substituted off) 66'; 7 – López; 11 – Tejeda (substituted off) 62'; 17 – Decas; 18 – Rodríguez; 22 – Moncada (substituted off) 46'; 23 – Delgado; 31 – Auzqui (substituted off) 60'; 35 – Meléndez (substituted off) 46'; Substitutes; 9 – Olego (substituted on) 46'; 15 – Gómez (substituted on) 46'; 34 – Baldunciel (substituted on) 60'; 26 – Villafranca (substituted on) 62'; 21 – Moreira (substituted on) 66'

27 February 2022 Week 7	Motagua	2–0	Platense	Tegucigalpa
16:00	Olego 23'; Moreira 82'	Report		Stadium: Estadio Nacional; Referee: Álex Morazán Starting XI: 25 – Licona; 2 – Maldonado; 4 – Mejía (substituted off) 46'; 9 – Olego (substituted off) 64'; 11 – Tejeda (substituted off) 70'; 12 – Santos; 17 – Decas; 22 – Moncada (substituted off) 46'; 23 – Delgado (substituted off) 70'; 32 – Núñez; 35 – Meléndez; Substitutes; 7 – López (substituted on) 46'; 34 – Baldunciel (substituted on) 46'; 21 – Moreira (substituted on) 64'; 31 – Auzqui (substituted on) 70'; 16 – Castellanos (substituted on) 70'
Note: This was manager's Diego Vásquez last match leading the team. Vásquez broke a club's and league's record of 8 plus years and 350 consecutive games as coach.

2 March 2022 Week 8	Motagua	2–1	Marathón	Tegucigalpa
19:00	Moreira 77' (pen.) 90+3'	Report	87' Solano	Stadium: Estadio Nacional; Referee: Melvin Matamoros Starting XI: 25 – Licona; 2 – Maldonado; 5 – Pereira; 7 – López; 9 – Olego (substituted off) 46'; 12 – Santos; 16 – Castellanos (substituted off) 57'; 17 – Decas; 21 – Moreira; 23 – Delgado (substituted off) 46'; 27 – García (substituted off) 73'; Substitutes; 11 – Tejeda (substituted on) 46'; 31 – Auzqui (substituted on) 46'; 32 – Núñez (substituted on) 57'; 4 – Mejía (substituted on) 73'
Note: Former star César Obando made his professional debut as interim coach.

6 March 2022 Week 9	Real Sociedad	2–1	Motagua	Tocoa
15:00	Martínez 58'; Martínez 88'	Report	40' Decas	Stadium: Estadio Francisco Martínez Durón; Referee: Selvin Brown Starting XI: 19 – Rougier; 2 – Maldonado; 5 – Pereira; 7 – López (substituted off) 80'; 11 – Tejeda; 17 – Decas; 21 – Moreira (substituted off) 69'; 23 – Delgado; 32 – Núñez; 35 – Meléndez (substituted off) 90'; 40 – Obando (substituted off) 46'; Substitutes; 31 – Auzqui (substituted on) 46'; 4 – Mejía (substituted on) 69'; 34 – Baldunciel (substituted on) 80'; 9 – Olego (substituted on) 90'
Note: Defender Wesly Decas scored his first goal for F.C. Motagua.

13 March 2022 Week 10	Motagua	0–2	Real España	Tegucigalpa
17:00		Report	23' Chávez; 53' Lacayo	Stadium: Estadio Nacional; Referee: Saíd Martínez Starting XI: 25 – Licona; 2 – Maldonado; 5 – Pereira; 7 – López (substituted off) 68'; 9 – Olego (substituted off) 46'; 12 – Santos (substituted off) 46'; 16 – Castellanos; 17 – Decas (substituted off) 85'; 21 – Moreira; 24 – Elvir; 31 – Auzqui (substituted off) 68'; Substitutes; 11 – Tejeda (substituted on) 46'; 4 – Mejía (substituted on) 46'; 22 – Moncada (substituted on) 68'; 27 – García (substituted on) 68'; 34 – Baldunciel (substituted on) 85'

19 March 2022 Week 11	Vida	2–0	Motagua	La Ceiba
19:30	Agámez 38'; Aguilar 66'	Report		Stadium: Estadio Nilmo Edwards; Referee: Orlando Hernández Starting XI: 25 – Licona; 2 – Maldonado; 4 – Mejía (substituted off) 70'; 5 – Pereira; 7 – López (substituted off) 77'; 11 – Tejeda (substituted off) 76'; 12 – Santos; 16 – Castellanos (substituted off) 65'; 23 – Delgado; 24 – Elvir; 34 – Baldunciel (substituted off) 46'; Substitutes; 27 – García (substituted on) 46'; 21 – Moreira (substituted on) 65'; 22 – Moncada (substituted on) 70'; 40 – Obando (substituted on) 76'; 9 – Olego (substituted on) 77'

2 April 2022 Week 12	Victoria	1–0	Motagua	La Ceiba
19:30	Lahera 41'	Report		Stadium: Estadio Nilmo Edwards; Referee: Orlando Hernández Starting XI: 25 – Licona; 2 – Maldonado; 5 – Pereira; 11 – Tejeda (substituted off) 86'; 12 – Santos (substituted off) 86'; 16 – Castellanos (substituted off) 61'; 17 – Decas; 21 – Moreira (substituted off) 70'; 23 – Delgado; 24 – Elvir; 31 – Auzqui (substituted off) 70'; Substitutes; 7 – López (substituted on) 61'; 9 – Olego (substituted on) 70'; 34 – Baldunciel (substituted on) 70'; 26 – Villafranca (substituted on) 86'; 40 – Obando (substituted on) 86'
Note: New manager Hernán Medina made his debut with F.C. Motagua.

6 April 2022 Week 13	Motagua	1–2	Olimpia	Tegucigalpa
19:00	Delgado 87'	Report	62' Arboleda; 69' Chirinos	Stadium: Estadio Nacional; Referee: Óscar Moncada Starting XI: 25 – Licona; 2 – Maldonado; 5 – Pereira; 7 – López (substituted off) 70'; 16 – Castellanos; 17 – Decas; 21 – Moreira (substituted off) 70'; 23 – Delgado; 24 – Elvir (substituted off) 19'; 31 – Auzqui (substituted off) 58'; 35 – Meléndez; Substitutes; 22 – Moncada (substituted on) 19'; 40 – Obando (substituted on) 58'; 11 – Tejeda (substituted on) 70'; 9 – Olego (substituted on) 70'
Note: F.C. Motagua lost five straight games for the first time since 2005.

10 April 2022 Week 14	Motagua	2–0	UPNFM	Tegucigalpa
16:00	López 19'; Meléndez 59'	Report		Stadium: Estadio Nacional; Referee: Jefferson Escobar Starting XI: 25 – Licona; 2 – Maldonado; 5 – Pereira; 7 – López (substituted off) 80'; 12 – Santos; 16 – Castellanos (substituted off) 66'; 17 – Decas; 21 – Moreira (substituted off) 81'; 22 – Moncada; 34 – Baldunciel (substituted off) 46'; 40 – Obando (substituted off) 66'; Substitutes; 35 – Meléndez (substituted on) 46'; 4 – Mejía (substituted on) 66'; 32 – Núñez (substituted on) 66'; 26 – Villafranca (substituted on) 80'; 27 – García (substituted on) 81'
Note: Coach Hernán Medina obtained his first victory in front of the club.

13 April 2022 Week 15	Marathón	0–3	Motagua	San Pedro Sula
15:06		Report	56' Moreira; 84' 90+2' Mejía	Stadium: Estadio Yankel Rosenthal; Referee: Armando Castro Starting XI: 25 – Licona; 2 – Maldonado; 5 – Pereira; 7 – López (substituted off) 86'; 12 – Santos; 17 – Decas; 21 – Moreira (substituted off) 66'; 22 – Moncada (substituted off) 73'; 23 – Delgado (substituted off) 73'; 27 – García (substituted off) 86'; 32 – Núñez; Substitutes; 26 – Villafranca (substituted on) 66'; 4 – Mejía (substituted on) 73'; 35 – Meléndez (substituted on) 73'; 31 – Auzqui (substituted on) 86'; 8 – Martínez (substituted on) 86'
Note: This was the largest away victory against C.D. Marathón since 1978.

20 April 2022 Week 16	Motagua	3–2	Honduras Progreso	Tegucigalpa
17:00	Moncada 31'; Martínez 66'; García 76'	Report	82' Martínez; 86' Martínez	Stadium: Estadio Nacional; Referee: Álex Morazán Starting XI: 25 – Licona; 2 – Maldonado; 5 – Pereira; 7 – López (substituted off) 79'; 12 – Santos; 16 – Castellanos; 17 – Decas; 21 – Moreira (substituted off) 73'; 22 – Moncada (substituted off) 60'; 23 – Delgado (substituted off) 73'; 32 – Núñez (substituted off) 60'; Substitutes; 4 – Mejía (substituted on) 60'; 8 – Martínez (substituted on) 60'; 11 – Tejeda (substituted on) 73'; 27 – García (substituted on) 73'; 9 – Olego (substituted on) 79'

24 April 2022 Week 17	Platense	0–0	Motagua	Puerto Cortés
18:00		Report		Stadium: Estadio Excélsior; Referee: Óscar Moncada Starting XI: 25 – Licona; 2 – Maldonado; 4 – Mejía (substituted off) 76'; 7 – López; 12 – Santos; 16 – Castellanos (substituted off) 62'; 21 – Moreira (substituted off) 86'; 22 – Moncada; 23 – Delgado (substituted off) 76'; 32 – Núñez; 35 – Meléndez; Substitutes; 8 – Martínez (substituted on) 62'; 34 – Baldunciel (substituted on) 76'; 27 – García (substituted on) 76'; 26 – Villafranca (substituted on) 86'
Note: With this scoreless draw, Platense F.C. was officially relegated to Liga de Ascenso.

30 April 2022 Week 18	Motagua	6–0	Real Sociedad	Tegucigalpa
19:00	Gutiérrez 15' (o.g.); Maldonado 36'; Moreira 55'; Mejía 61'; Villafranca 69'; Montoya 75' (o.g.)	Report		Stadium: Estadio Nacional; Referee: Armando Castro Starting XI: 25 – Licona; 2 – Maldonado; 5 – Pereira; 7 – López (substituted off) 67'; 17 – Decas; 21 – Moreira (substituted off) 59'; 22 – Moncada (substituted off) 67'; 23 – Delgado; 31 – Auzqui (substituted off) 58'; 32 – Núñez; 35 – Meléndez (substituted off) 13'; Substitutes; 24 – Elvir (substituted on) 13'; 4 – Mejía (substituted on) 58'; 8 – Martínez (substituted on) 59'; 11 – Tejeda (substituted on) 67'; 26 – Villafranca (substituted on) 67'
Note: F.C. Motagua finished the regular season in 4th place. This was the fifth time in Motagua's history winning a match with a margin of six goals or more.

4 May 2022 Play-offs	Vida	0–3	Motagua	La Ceiba
19:30		Report	50' López; 73' Santos; 78' Moncada	Stadium: Estadio Nilmo Edwards; Referee: Álex Morazán Starting XI: 25 – Licona; 2 – Maldonado; 5 – Pereira; 7 – López (substituted off) 69'; 12 – Santos; 16 – Castellanos (substituted off) 63'; 17 – Decas; 21 – Moreira (substituted off) 85'; 22 – Moncada; 23 – Delgado (substituted off) 70'; 32 – Núñez (substituted off) 85'; Substitutes; 27 – García (substituted on) 63'; 4 – Mejía (substituted on) 69'; 8 – Martínez (substituted on) 70'; 26 – Villafranca (substituted on) 85'; 34 – Baldunciel (substituted on) 85'
Note: This is the second time in league history that these two clubs faced in this phase. Defender Raúl Santos scored his first league goal for F.C. Motagua.

8 May 2022 Play-offs	Motagua	0–0	Vida	Tegucigalpa
17:00		Report		Stadium: Estadio Nacional; Referee: Orlando Hernández Starting XI: 25 – Licona; 2 – Maldonado; 5 – Pereira; 7 – López; 12 – Santos (substituted off) 74'; 16 – Castellanos (substituted off) 46'; 17 – Decas; 21 – Moreira (substituted off) 56'; 22 – Moncada; 23 – Delgado (substituted off) 46'; 32 – Núñez (substituted off) 46'; Substitutes; 4 – Mejía (substituted on) 46'; 27 – García (substituted on) 46'; 8 – Martínez (substituted on) 46'; 26 – Villafranca (substituted on) 56'; 35 – Meléndez (substituted on) 74'
Note: With a 3–0 score on aggregate, F.C. Motagua advanced to their 14th semifinal in a row. Midfielder Héctor Castellanos reached 200 league games with the club.

12 May 2022 Semifinals	Motagua	1–1	Olimpia	Tegucigalpa
19:00	Moreira 24'	Report	22' Chirinos	Stadium: Estadio Nacional; Referee: Saíd Martínez Starting XI: 25 – Licona; 2 – Maldonado; 7 – López; 12 – Santos; 16 – Castellanos; 17 – Decas; 21 – Moreira (substituted off) 74'; 22 – Moncada; 23 – Delgado (substituted off) 58'; 32 – Núñez (substituted off) 85'; 35 – Meléndez; Substitutes; 4 – Mejía (substituted on) 58'; 26 – Villafranca (substituted on) 74'; 27 – García (substituted on) 85'
Note: This is the 13th encounter between these two teams in a semifinal stage.

15 May 2022 Semifinals	Olimpia	0–1	Motagua	Tegucigalpa
17:00		Report	5' Moreira	Stadium: Estadio Nacional; Referee: Melvin Matamoros Starting XI: 25 – Licona; 2 – Maldonado; 5 – Pereira; 8 – Martínez (substituted off) 71'; 11 – Tejeda (substituted off) 90'; 12 – Santos; 17 – Decas; 21 – Moreira (substituted off) 71'; 22 – Moncada; 23 – Delgado (substituted off) 71'; 32 – Núñez (substituted off) 90'; Substitutes; 4 – Mejía (substituted on) 71'; 26 – Villafranca (substituted on) 71'; 27 – García (substituted on) 71'; 3 – Meléndez (substituted on) 90'; 6 – Sánchez (substituted on) 90'
Note: With a 2–1 win on aggregate, F.C. Motagua advanced to their 27th final in league's history.

22 May 2022 Final	Motagua	3–0	Real España	Tegucigalpa
17:00	Moreira 29'; Tejeda 53'; López 85'	Report		Stadium: Estadio Nacional; Referee: Melvin Matamoros Starting XI: 25 – Licona; 2 – Maldonado; 5 – Pereira; 8 – Martínez (substituted off) 83'; 11 – Tejeda; 12 – Santos; 17 – Decas; 21 – Moreira (substituted off) 55'; 22 – Moncada (substituted off) 83'; 23 – Delgado (substituted off) 90'; 32 – Núñez; Substitutes; 7 – López (substituted on) 55'; 24 – Elvir (substituted on) 83'; 27 – García (substituted on) 83'; 16 – Castellanos (substituted on) 90'

29 May 2022 Final	Real España	2–0	Motagua	San Pedro Sula
15:00	García 38'; Rocca 44'	Report		Stadium: Estadio Olímpico Metropolitano; Referee: Selvin Brown Starting XI: 25 – Licona; 2 – Maldonado; 5 – Pereira; 8 – Martínez (substituted off) 65'; 11 – Tejeda (substituted off) 59'; 12 – Santos; 17 – Decas; 21 – Moreira (substituted off) 65'; 22 – Moncada (substituted off) 70'; 23 – Delgado; 32 – Núñez; Substitutes; 4 – Mejía (substituted on) 59'; 16 – Castellanos (substituted on) 65'; 26 – Villafranca (substituted on) 65'; 24 – Elvir (substituted on) 70'
Note: With a 3–2 win on aggregate, F.C. Motagua obtained their 18th league title.

=== CONCACAF League ===
23 September 2021 Round of 16	Universitario (Panama)	2–2	(Honduras) Motagua	Panama City, Panama
22:00 EST	González 18'; Triana 48'	Report	58' 72' López	Stadium: Estadio Nacional de Panamá; Referee: Julio Luna (GUA) Starting XI: 25 – Licona; 5 – Pereira; 6 – Sánchez (substituted off) 46'; 11 – Vega (substituted off) 87'; 17 – Decas; 22 – Moncada (substituted off) 46'; 23 – Delgado; 24 – Elvir; 31 – Auzqui (substituted off) 69'; 34 – López (substituted off) 80'; 35 – Meléndez; Substitutes; 9 – Klusener (substituted on) 46'; 8 – Martínez (substituted on) 46'; 7 – López (substituted on) 69'; 16 – Castellanos (substituted on) 80'; 29 – Fernández (substituted on) 87'
Note: This was the first ever encounter between these two sides.

30 September 2021 Round of 16	Motagua (Honduras)	1–0	(Panama) Universitario	Tegucigalpa, Honduras
20:15 CST	Decas 39' (pen.)	Report		Stadium: Estadio Nacional; Referee: Óscar Mejía (MEX) Starting XI: 19 – Rougier; 5 – Pereira; 7 – I. López (substituted off) 62'; 8 – Martínez (substituted off) 7'; 11 – Vega (substituted off) 63'; 16 – Castellanos; 17 – Decas; 24 – Elvir; 31 – Auzqui (substituted off) 83'; 34 – K. López (substituted off) 83'; 35 – Meléndez; Substitutes; 23 – Delgado (substituted on) 7'; 29 – Fernández (substituted on) 62'; 26 – Villafranca (substituted on) 63'; 9 – Klusener (substituted on) 83'; 22 – Moncada (substituted on) 83'
Note: With a 3–2 aggregated score, F.C. Motagua advanced to the next round. Defender Wesly Decas scored his first international goal with the club.

21 October 2021 Quarterfinals	Marathón (Honduras)	0–2	(Honduras) Motagua	San Pedro Sula, Honduras
20:00 CST		Report	6' Auzqui; 63' Klusener	Stadium: Estadio Olímpico Metropolitano; Referee: Walter López (GUA) Starting XI: 19 – Rougier; 3 – Meléndez; 5 – Pereira; 7 – López (substituted off) 76'; 9 – Klusener (substituted off) 74'; 17 – Decas; 23 – Delgado (substituted off) 84'; 24 – Elvir; 31 – Auzqui (substituted off) 75'; 34 – López (substituted off) 49'; 35 – Meléndez; Substitutes; 29 – Fernández (substituted on) 49'; 21 – Moreira (substituted on) 74'; 18 – Rodríguez (substituted on) 75'; 10 – Galvaliz (substituted on) 76'; 12 – Santos (substituted on) 84'
Note: This was the first international encounter between these two sides since 2002.

2 November 2021 Quarterfinals	Motagua (Honduras)	2–0	(Honduras) Marathón	Tegucigalpa, Honduras
20:15 CST	Moreira 81' 87'	Report		Stadium: Estadio Nacional; Referee: Daneon Parchment (JAM) Starting XI: 19 – Rougier; 3 – Meléndez; 7 – López (substituted off) 61'; 9 – Klusener (substituted off) 76'; 12 – Santos; 17 – Decas; 18 – Rodríguez (substituted off) 69'; 23 – Delgado; 24 – Elvir; 34 – López (substituted off) 76'; 35 – Meléndez; Substitutes; 5 – Pereira (substituted on) 61'; 10 – Galvaliz (substituted on) 69'; 11 – Vega (substituted on) 76'; 21 – Moreira (substituted on) 76'
Note: F.C. Motagua advanced to the semifinals with a 4–0 aggregated score and qualified to the 2022 CONCACAF Champions League.

24 November 2021 Semifinals	Forge (Canada)	2–2	(Honduras) Motagua	Hamilton, Canada
20:00 EST	Navarro 83'; Awuah 90+4'	Report	43' López; 64' Pereira	Stadium: Tim Hortons Field; Referee: Luis Enrique Santander (MEX) Starting XI: 19 – Rougier; 3 – Meléndez; 5 – Pereira; 9 – Klusener (substituted off) 64'; 11 – Vega (substituted off) 78'; 12 – Santos; 16 – Castellanos; 23 – Delgado; 24 – Elvir; 31 – Auzqui (substituted off) 77'; 34 – López (substituted off) 86'; Substitutes; 21 – Moreira (substituted on) 64'; 10 – Galvaliz (substituted on) 77'; 18 – Rodríguez (substituted on) 78'; 35 – Meléndez (substituted on) 86'
Note: This was the first ever F.C. Motagua's encounter against Forge FC, the first one against a Canadian side in this competition and the first one against a Canadian rival in CONCACAF's competitions since 2010.

1 December 2021 Semifinals	Motagua (Honduras)	0–0	(Canada) Forge	Tegucigalpa, Honduras
18:00 CST		Report		Stadium: Estadio Nacional; Referee: José Torres (PUR) Starting XI: 19 – Rougier; 3 – Meléndez; 5 – Pereira; 11 – Vega (substituted off) 61'; 12 – Santos; 16 – Castellanos; 21 – Moreira (substituted off) 61'; 23 – Delgado; 24 – Elvir; 31 – Auzqui (substituted off) 83'; 34 – López (substituted off) 90+4'; Substitutes; 7 – López (substituted on) 61'; 9 – Klusener (substituted on) 61'; 22 – Moncada (substituted on) 83'; 17 – Decas (substituted on) 90+4'
Note: Thanks to their two away goals, F.C. Motagua qualified to their 3rd CONCACAF League's final in history.

8 December 2021 Final	Motagua (Honduras)	1–2	(Guatemala) Comunicaciones	Tegucigalpa, Honduras
20:00 CST	Moreira 41'	Report	22' Aparicio; 79' Anangonó	Stadium: Estadio Nacional; Referee: Oshang Nation (JAM) Starting XI: 19 – Rougier; 5 – Pereira; 7 – López (substituted off) 64'; 12 – Santos; 17 – Decas; 21 – Moreira (substituted off) 64'; 23 – Delgado; 24 – Elvir; 31 – Auzqui (substituted off) 78'; 34 – López; 35 – Meléndez (substituted off) 64'; Substitutes; 9 – Klusener (substituted on) 64'; 10 – Galvaliz (substituted on) 64'; 29 – Fernández (substituted on) 64'; 11 – Vega (substituted on) 78'
Note: This was the 17th encounter between these two teams in official matches, and their first one since 2020.

14 December 2021 Final	Comunicaciones (Guatemala)	4–2	(Honduras) Motagua	Guatemala City, Guatemala
20:00 CST	Anangonó 42' 45+1' 66'; Lacayo 54'	Report	4' Moreira; 27' Vega	Stadium: Estadio Doroteo Guamuch Flores; Referee: Luis Enrique Santander (MEX) Starting XI: 19 – Rougier; 5 – Pereira (substituted off) 46'; 11 – Vega (substituted off) 46'; 12 – Santos; 17 – Decas; 21 – Moreira (substituted off) 81'; 23 – Delgado (substituted off) 63'; 24 – Elvir; 31 – Auzqui (substituted off) 81'; 32 – Núñez; 34 – López; Substitutes; 26 – Villafranca (substituted on) 46'; 35 – Meléndez (substituted on) 46'; 22 – Moncada (substituted on) 63'; 7 – López (substituted on) 81'; 9 – Klusener (substituted on) 81'
Note: For the third time, F.C. Motagua felt short to be crowned in this competition by losing 3–6 on aggregated score.

=== CONCACAF Champions League ===
17 February 2022 Round of 16	Motagua (Honduras)	0–0	(United States) Seattle Sounders FC	San Pedro Sula
20:00 CST		Report		Stadium: Estadio Olímpico Metropolitano; Attendance: Closed gates Referee: Luis Enrique Santander (MEX) Starting XI: 25 – Licona; 2 – Maldonado; 5 – Pereira; 9 – Olego (substituted off) 78'; 12 – Santos; 17 – Decas; 21 – Moreira (substituted off) 58'; 24 – Elvir; 31 – Auzqui (substituted off) 78'; 32 – Núñez; 34 – Baldunciel (substituted off) 66'; Substitutes; 11 – Tejeda (substituted on) 58'; 22 – Moncada (substituted on) 66'; 7 – López (substituted on) 78'; 4 – Mejía (substituted on) 78'
Note: This was the first ever match against Seattle Sounders FC and the first one against an MLS team since 2020.

24 February 2022 Round of 16	Seattle Sounders FC (United States)	5–0	(Honduras) Motagua	Seattle, United States
19:45 PST	Lodeiro 33'; Roldan 47'; Morris 56'; Rowe 62'; Chú 74'	Report		Stadium: Lumen Field; Attendance: 28,954; Referee: Iván Cisneros (SLV) Starting XI: 19 – Rougier; 2 – Maldonado; 5 – Pereira; 11 – Tejeda (substituted off) 46'; 12 – Santos; 17 – Decas; 21 – Moreira; 22 – Moncada (substituted off) 56'; 31 – Auzqui (substituted off) 70'; 32 – Núñez; 35 – Meléndez (substituted off) 46'; Substitutes; 9 – Olego (substituted on) 46'; 18 – Rodríguez (substituted on) 46'; 34 – Baldunciel (substituted on) 56'; 7 – López (substituted on) 70'
Note: F.C. Motagua suffered their biggest defeat in international competition in their history. After the elimination, the club's Board of Directors decided to separate manager Diego Vásquez after a record 8+ years as DT. Vásquez would be managing his last game in their next league match.

== Statistics ==
- As of 29 May 2022

Competition	GP	GW	GD	GL	GF	GA	GD	CS	SG	Per
League	46	23	12	11	76	44	+32	18	13	58.70%
CONCACAF League	8	3	3	2	12	10	+2	4	1	50.00%
CONCACAF Champions League	2	0	1	1	0	5	–5	1	2	16.67%
Others	4	3	1	0	16	3	+13	2	1	83.33%
Totals	60	29	17	14	104	62	+42	25	17	57.78%
