= 2020–21 F.C. Motagua season =

Motagua
2020–21 season
- Chairman: Eduardo Atala
- Manager: Diego Vásquez
- Stadium: Nacional
- Apertura: Finalist
- Clausura: Finalist
- CONCACAF League: Play-in round
- Top goalscorer: League: Moreira (14); All: Moreira (14)
Home colours	Away colours
- All statistics correct as of 19 May 2021.

The 2020–21 season was F.C. Motagua's 74th season in existence and the club's 55th consecutive season in the top fight of Honduran football. In addition to the domestic league, the club also competed for the 2020 CONCACAF League.

== Overview ==
As coach Diego Vásquez renewed his contract, he led the team for his 14th consecutive tournament. After two straight defeats against C.D. Olimpia and Nicaraguan side Real Estelí FC at the 2020 CONCACAF League, F.C. Motagua was unable to qualify to their second straight CONCACAF Champions League. Only one month later, the team was eliminated from domestic contention (Apertura) against Olimpia in the so called "Final de Liguilla" (Playoffs finals). In May 2021, Motagua was unable to reach another final as they lost to Olimpia in the Clausura Playoff final series in penalty shoot-outs.

== Kits ==
The 2020–21 home and away kits were published on 25 September, one day before their debut in the Apertura tournament. Unlike previous seasons, no third kit was released.

Manufacturer		Main sponsor	
Joma		Pepsi	
Home	Away	Alternative	Goalkeeper

== Players ==
=== Transfers in ===
Player	Contract date	Moving from
(Honduras) Bayron Méndez	1 October 2020	(Honduras) Real Sociedad
(Honduras) Josué Villafranca	19 December 2020	(Spain) Intercity
(Honduras) Óscar García	15 January 2021	(Honduras) Real de Minas
(Honduras) Diego Rodríguez	15 January 2021	(Honduras) Real de Minas
(Honduras) Jesse Moncada	18 January 2021	(Honduras) Real de Minas
(Honduras) Juan Delgado	18 January 2021	Honduras Progreso
(Honduras) Iván López	18 January 2021	(Honduras) Real España
(Honduras) Carlos Fernández	25 January 2021	(Uruguay) Fénix
(Honduras) Elmer Güity	1 February 2021	(Honduras) UPNFM

=== Transfers out ===
Player	Released date	Moving to
(Honduras) Marcelo Canales	22 August 2020	Honduras Progreso
(Honduras) Erick Andino	22 August 2020	Honduras Progreso
(Honduras) Éverson López	7 September 2020	(Honduras) Real de Minas
(Honduras) Jack Baptiste	12 September 2020	(Honduras) Real de Minas
(Honduras) César Romero	12 September 2020	(Honduras) Real de Minas
(Honduras) Josué Villafranca	4 October 2020	(Spain) Intercity
(Honduras) Rubilio Castillo	13 January 2021	(Bolivia) Royal Pari
(Honduras) Wilmer Crisanto	13 January 2021	(Honduras) Marathón
(Honduras) Félix Crisanto	13 January 2021	TBD
(Honduras) Emilio Izaguirre	13 January 2021	(Honduras) Marathón

=== Squad ===
- Statistics as of 19 May 2021
- Only league matches into account

No.	Pos.	Player name	Date of birth and age	Games played			Goals scored		
				< 19/20	20/21	Total	< 19/20	20/21	Total
1	GK	(Honduras) Hugo Caballero	5 January 1997 (aged 23)	0	1	1	0	0	0
2	DF	(Honduras) Juan Montes	26 October 1985 (aged 34)	240	18	258	14	0	14
3	DF	(Honduras) Harrinson Bernárdez	14 May 1997 (aged 23)	6	1	7	0	0	0
3	DF	(Honduras) Elmer Güity	24 October 1996 (aged 23)	0	3	3	0	0	0
4	MF	(Honduras) Sergio Peña	9 May 1987 (aged 33)	50	24	74	3	2	5
5	DF	(Honduras) Marcelo Pereira	27 May 1995 (aged 25)	122	27	149	9	0	9
6	MF	(Honduras) Reinieri Mayorquín	13 July 1989 (aged 30)	201	14	215	12	1	13
7	DF	(Honduras) Emilio Izaguirre	10 May 1986 (aged 34)	160	16	176	5	0	5
7	MF	(Honduras) Iván López	5 October 1990 (aged 29)	0	17	17	0	3	3
8	MF	(Honduras) Walter Martínez	26 March 1991 (aged 29)	103	37	140	9	4	13
9	FW	(Argentina) Gonzalo Klusener	21 October 1983 (aged 36)	11	35	46	4	12	16
10	MF	(Argentina) Matías Galvaliz	6 June 1989 (aged 31)	61	36	97	6	2	8
11	FW	(Honduras) Marco Vega	14 April 1987 (aged 33)	112	27	139	20	8	28
12	MF	(Honduras) Raúl Santos	2 August 1992 (aged 27)	74	26	100	0	0	0
14	MF	(Honduras) Bayron Méndez	4 July 1988 (aged 31)	0	8	8	0	1	1
15	MF	(Honduras) Juan Gómez	3 April 2000 (aged 20)	2	4	6	0	0	0
16	MF	(Honduras) Héctor Castellanos	28 December 1992 (aged 27)	158	24	182	1	1	2
17	DF	(Honduras) Wesly Decas	11 August 1999 (aged 20)	3	26	29	0	0	0
18	DF	(Honduras) Wilmer Crisanto	24 June 1989 (aged 31)	222	11	233	19	0	19
18	DF	(Honduras) Diego Rodríguez	6 November 1995 (aged 24)	0	6	6	0	0	0
19	GK	(Argentina) Jonathan Rougier	29 October 1987 (aged 32)	118	33	151	0	0	0
21	FW	(Paraguay) Roberto Moreira	6 May 1987 (aged 33)	74	36	110	36	14	50
22	MF	(Honduras) Jesse Moncada	5 January 1990 (aged 30)	0	10	10	0	1	1
23	MF	(Honduras) Juan Delgado	21 July 1992 (aged 27)	0	14	14	0	1	1
24	DF	(Honduras) Omar Elvir	28 September 1989 (aged 30)	276	29	305	10	2	12
25	GK	(Honduras) Marlon Licona	9 February 1991 (aged 29)	88	7	95	0	0	0
26	FW	(Honduras) Josué Villafranca	16 November 1999 (aged 20)	8	8	16	1	1	2
27	DF	(Honduras) Félix Crisanto	9 September 1990 (aged 29)	123	4	127	7	0	7
27	MF	(Honduras) Óscar García	16 May 1990 (aged 30)	0	9	9	0	1	1
29	FW	(Honduras) Rubilio Castillo	26 November 1991 (aged 28)	161	14	175	89	10	99
29	FW	(Honduras) Carlos Fernández	17 February 1992 (aged 28)	0	18	18	0	2	2
32	MF	(Honduras) Jonathan Núñez	26 November 2001 (aged 18)	7	16	23	0	1	1
33	DF	(Honduras) Albert Galindo	21 October 2001 (aged 18)	1	2	3	0	0	0
34	FW	(Honduras) Kevin López	3 February 1996 (aged 24)	156	32	188	29	8	37
35	DF	(Honduras) Cristopher Meléndez	25 November 1997 (aged 22)	38	29	67	0	2	2
41	DF	(Honduras) Marvin Ávila	9 March 2002 (aged 18)	0	1	1	0	0	0
42	MF	(Honduras) Arnold Álvarez	19 January 2001 (aged 19)	0	2	2	0	0	0
44	MF	(Honduras) Danilo Palacios	11 June 2001 (aged 19)	0	2	2	0	0	0
45	MF	(Honduras) Ariel Flores	18 May 2001 (aged 19)	0	1	1	0	0	0
53	FW	(Honduras) Eduardo Arriola	4 January 2001 (aged 19)	0	1	1	0	0	0
54	FW	(Honduras) Andy Hernández	15 December 2003 (aged 16)	0	1	1	0	0	0
Manager		(Argentina) Diego Vásquez	3 July 1971 (aged 48)	23 November 2013–					

=== Goalkeeper's action ===
- As of 19 May 2021

Goalkeeper	Years evaluated	Games	Goals	Per.
(Argentina) Jonathan Rougier	2017–2021	151	139	0.921
(Honduras) Hugo Caballero	2021–2021	1	1	1.000
(Honduras) Marlon Licona	2010–2017, 2018–2021	95	105	1.105

=== International caps ===
- As of 12 June 2021

This is a list of players that were playing for Motagua during the 2020–21 season and were called to represent Honduras at different international competitions.

Player	Team	Event	Caps	Goals
Héctor Castellanos	Adult	Friendly v Nicaragua	1	0
Rubilio Castillo	Adult	Friendly v Nicaragua	1	0
Omar Elvir	Adult	Friendly v Guatemala	1	0
Emilio Izaguirre	Adult	Friendly v Nicaragua	1	0
Kevin López	Adult	Friendlies v Nicaragua and Greece	2	0
Walter Martínez	Adult	Friendlies v Belarus and Mexico	2	0
Marcelo Pereira	Adult	Friendlies v Nicaragua, Guatemala, Belarus, Greece and Mexico	5	0
Marcelo Pereira	Adult	2021 CONCACAF Nations League Finals	2	0
Diego Rodríguez	Adult	Friendlies v Belarus, Greece and Mexico	3	1
Diego Rodríguez	Adult	2021 CONCACAF Nations League Finals	2	0
Raúl Santos	Adult	Friendlies v Nicaragua and Guatemala	2	0
Wesly Decas	Under-23	2020 CONCACAF Men's Olympic Qualifying Championship	5	0
Cristopher Meléndez	Under-23	2020 CONCACAF Men's Olympic Qualifying Championship	5	0
Jonathan Núñez	Under-23	2020 CONCACAF Men's Olympic Qualifying Championship	3	0

== Results ==
All times are local CST unless stated otherwise

=== Preseason and friendlies ===
19 September 2020 Friendly	Motagua	3–2	Honduras Progreso	Comayagua
16:00	Klusener 48'; Vega 50'; Crisanto 53' (pen.)		27' Andino; 40' Gutiérrez	Stadium: Estadio Carlos Miranda; Attendance: Closed gates Referee: Starting XI: 19 – Rougier (substituted off); 2 – Montes; 6 – Mayorquín; 7 – Izaguirre; 10 – Galvaliz; 12 – Santos; 16 – Castellanos; 21 – Moreira; 29 – Castillo; 34 – López; 35 – Meléndez; Substitutes; 24 – Elvir (substituted on); 5 – Pereira (substituted on); 25 – Licona (substituted on); 4 – Peña (substituted on); 11 – Vega (substituted on); 32 – Núñez (substituted on); 9 – Klusener (substituted on)
Note: This was the first F.C. Motagua's game since March due to the COVID-19 disruption.

23 January 2021 Friendly	Motagua	6–1	Génesis Huracán	Tegucigalpa
09:00	Klusener; Montes; Villafranca; Moreira			Stadium: Estadio Tiburcio Carías Andino; Attendance: Closed gates

30 January 2021 Friendly	Motagua	9–1	Broncos	Amarateca
	Galvaliz; Moreira; Klusener; Villafranca; López; Montes			Stadium: Pedro Atala Simón Complex; Attendance: Closed gates

3 February 2021 Friendly	Motagua	2–1	Olancho	Amarateca
	Moreira; Galvaliz			Stadium: Pedro Atala Simón Complex; Attendance: Closed gates

6 February 2021 Friendly	Motagua	3–0	Atlético Independiente	Amarateca
09:00	Martínez; Fernández; Moncada			Stadium: Pedro Atala Simón Complex; Attendance: Closed gates

=== Apertura ===
26 September 2020 Week 1	UPNFM	2–3	Motagua	Tegucigalpa
19:00	Róchez 27'; Moncada 69' (pen.)	Report	7' Castillo; 20' Moreira; 90+4' Klusener	Stadium: Estadio Tiburcio Carías Andino; Attendance: Closed gates Referee: Saíd Martínez Starting XI: 19 – Rougier; 2 – Montes; 4 – Peña (substituted off) 74'; 7 – Izaguirre (substituted off) 86'; 10 – Galvaliz; 12 – Santos; 16 – Castellanos; 21 – Moreira (substituted off) 79'; 29 – Castillo (substituted off) 86'; 34 – López; 35 – Meléndez (substituted off) 80'; Substitutes; 8 – Martínez (substituted on) 74'; 9 – Klusener (substituted on) 79'; 18 – Crisanto (substituted on) 80'; 24 – Elvir (substituted on) 86'; 11 – Vega (substituted on) 86'
Note: For the first time, F.C. Motagua was allowed to use the temporary five substitutions rule proposed by FIFA in order to lessen the impact of fixture congestion caused by the COVID-19 pandemic. A late goal from Gonzalo Klusener in injury time, gave Motagua the first win of the season.

7 October 2020 Week 2	Marathón	1–2	Motagua	San Pedro Sula
15:00	Banegas 90' (pen.)	Report	71' Vega; 83' Méndez	Stadium: Estadio Yankel Rosenthal; Attendance: Closed gates Referee: Héctor Rodríguez Starting XI: 19 – Rougier; 4 – Peña (substituted off) 69'; 6 – Mayorquín (substituted off) 46'; 8 – Martínez (substituted off) 67'; 10 – Galvaliz; 17 – Decas; 18 – W. Crisanto (substituted off) 69'; 21 – Moreira (substituted off) 67'; 24 – Elvir; 27 – F. Crisanto; 35 – Meléndez; Substitutes; 9 – Klusener (substituted on) 46'; 14 – Méndez (substituted on) 67'; 11 – Vega (substituted on) 67'; 32 – Núñez (substituted on) 69'; 15 – Gómez (substituted on) 69'
Note: Midfielder Bayron Méndez made his official debut scoring the winning goal.

11 October 2020 Week 3	Motagua	2–1	Real Sociedad	Tegucigalpa
16:00	Klusener 9'; Martínez 22'	Report	32' Olariaga	Stadium: Estadio Tiburcio Carías Andino; Attendance: Closed gates Referee: Jefferson Escobar Starting XI: 19 – Rougier; 2 – Montes; 3 – Bernárdez (substituted off) 46'; 4 – Peña; 8 – Martínez (substituted off) 46'; 9 – Klusener (substituted off) 65'; 10 – Galvaliz (substituted off) 85'; 18 – Crisanto (substituted off) 69'; 21 – Moreira; 24 – Elvir; 35 – Meléndez; Substitutes; 6 – Mayorquín (substituted on) 46'; 32 – Núñez (substituted on) 46'; 11 – Vega (substituted on) 65'; 14 – Méndez (substituted on) 69'; 15 – Gómez (substituted on) 85'
Note: Referee Jefferson Escobar officiated a F.C. Motagua's game for his first time. Midfielder Omar Elvir was honored by the club for reaching 300 games with the institution.

15 October 2020 Week 4	Motagua	0–0	Olimpia	Tegucigalpa
17:00		Report		Stadium: Estadio Tiburcio Carías Andino; Attendance: Closed gates Referee: Nelson Salgado Starting XI: 19 – Rougier; 2 – Montes; 5 – Pereira; 6 – Mayorquín (substituted off) 76'; 10 – Galvaliz (substituted off) 65'; 16 – Castellanos; 21 – Moreira (substituted off) 52'; 24 – Elvir; 29 – Castillo (substituted off) 75'; 34 – López (substituted off) 65'; 35 – Meléndez; Substitutes; 9 – Klusener (substituted on) 52'; 8 – Martínez (substituted on) 65'; 18 – Crisanto (substituted on) 65'; 11 – Vega (substituted on) 75'; 4 – Peña (substituted on) 76'
Note: This derby returned to Tegucigalpa after 5 games being played at alternate venues. Midfielder Wilmer Crisanto reached 400 games in Liga Nacional.

18 October 2020 Week 5	Real de Minas	0–3	Motagua	Danlí
17:00		Report	50' Klusener; 57' Vega; 88' Moreira	Stadium: Estadio Marcelo Tinoco; Attendance: Closed gates Referee: Selvin Brown Starting XI: 25 – Licona; 4 – Peña (substituted off) 46'; 7 – Izaguirre; 8 – Martínez (substituted off) 67'; 9 – Klusener (substituted off) 67'; 11 – Vega; 12 – Santos; 17 – Decas; 18 – Crisanto (substituted off) 75'; 32 – Núñez (substituted off) 46'; 35 – Meléndez; Substitutes; 10 – Galvaliz (substituted on) 46'; 16 – Castellanos (substituted on) 46'; 6 – Mayorquín (substituted on) 67'; 21 – Moreira (substituted on) 67'; 34 – López (substituted on) 75'
Note: For the first time, F.C. Motagua played at this venue at night.

6 December 2020 Week 6	Motagua	0–1	UPNFM	Tegucigalpa
16:00		Report	11' (pen.) Moncada	Stadium: Estadio Tiburcio Carías Andino; Attendance: Closed gates Referee: Óscar Moncada Starting XI: 25 – Licona; 4 – Peña (substituted off) 67'; 5 – Pereira; 8 – Martínez (substituted off) 46'; 9 – Klusener; 10 – Galvaliz (substituted off) 66'; 12 – Santos; 17 – Decas; 24 – Elvir; 34 – López (substituted off) 61'; 35 – Meléndez (substituted off) 46'; Substitutes; 14 – Méndez (substituted on) 46'; 11 – Vega (substituted on) 46'; 18 – Crisanto (substituted on) 61'; 7 – Izaguirre (substituted on) 66'; 16 – Castellanos (substituted on) 67'
Note: Due to the passing of Hurricane Iota, week 6 was postponed. Lobos UPNFM defeated F.C. Motagua for the first time in league's history.

25 October 2020 Week 7	Motagua	1–1	Marathón	Tegucigalpa
16:00	Klusener 37'	Report	73' Vigil	Stadium: Estadio Tiburcio Carías Andino; Attendance: Closed gates Referee: Ángel Cruz Starting XI: 25 – Licona; 5 – Pereira; 6 – Mayorquín (substituted off) 76'; 7 – Izaguirre (substituted off) 66'; 9 – Klusener (substituted off) 65'; 14 – Méndez (substituted off) 59'; 16 – Castellanos; 17 – Decas; 29 – Castillo; 34 – López; 35 – Meléndez; Substitutes; 10 – Galvaliz (substituted on) 59'; 21 – Moreira (substituted on) 65'; 24 – Elvir (substituted on) 66'; 8 – Martínez (substituted on) 76'
Note: Despite the draw, F.C. Motagua stayed at the top of the standings.

28 October 2020 Week 8	Real Sociedad	1–5	Motagua	Tocoa
15:00	Melgares 63' (pen.)	Report	20' Castillo; 25' Martínez; 70' López; 74' Vega; 89' (pen.) Klusener	Stadium: Estadio Francisco Martínez Durón; Attendance: Closed gates Referee: Armando Castro Starting XI: 19 – Rougier; 4 – Peña (substituted off) 82'; 7 – Izaguirre (substituted off) 65'; 8 – Martínez (substituted off) 81'; 9 – Klusener; 12 – Santos; 17 – Decas; 24 – Elvir; 29 – Castillo (substituted off) 65'; 32 – Núñez (substituted off) 65'; 35 – Meléndez; Substitutes; 6 – Mayorquín (substituted on) 65'; 11 – Vega (substituted on) 65'; 34 – López (substituted on) 65'; 42 – Álvarez (substituted on) 81'; 5 – Pereira (substituted on) 82'
Note: This became the second ever F.C. Motagua's victory at this venue and the largest away win since October 1999 (2–7 v C.D. Federal). Youngster Arnold Álvarez made his debut wearing the jersey number 42.

1 November 2020 Week 9	Olimpia	2–1	Motagua	Tegucigalpa
16:00	Bengtson 18'; Reyes 86'	Report	90+2' (pen.) Castillo	Stadium: Estadio Tiburcio Carías Andino; Attendance: Closed gates Referee: Saíd Martínez Starting XI: 19 – Rougier; 2 – Montes; 5 – Pereira; 6 – Mayorquín (substituted off) 46'; 9 – Klusener (substituted off) 46'; 10 – Galvaliz; 16 – Castellanos; 21 – Moreira (substituted off) 75'; 24 – Elvir (substituted off) 80'; 34 – López; 35 – Meléndez (substituted off) 46'; Substitutes; 8 – Martínez (substituted on) 46'; 12 – Santos (substituted on) 46'; 29 – Castillo (substituted on) 46'; 4 – Peña (substituted on) 75'; 7 – Izaguirre (substituted on) 80'
Note: F.C. Motagua's unbeaten run came to an end with their first league loss since March 2020.

21 November 2020 Week 10	Motagua	2–1	Real de Minas	Tegucigalpa
19:00	López 83'; Moreira 90+5'	Report	51' García	Stadium: Estadio Tiburcio Carías Andino; Attendance: Closed gates Referee: Carlos Cruz Starting XI: 19 – Rougier; 4 – Peña (substituted off) 81'; 5 – Pereira; 7 – Izaguirre (substituted off) 46'; 8 – Martínez (substituted off) 46'; 9 – Klusener; 10 – Galvaliz; 17 – Decas; 21 – Moreira; 24 – Elvir; 32 – Núñez (substituted off) 46'; Substitutes; 35 – Meléndez (substituted on) 46'; 34 – López (substituted on) 46'; 6 – Mayorquín (substituted on) 46'; 15 – Gómez (substituted on) 81'
Note: Two late goals allowed F.C. Motagua to achieve a tough win.

26 November 2020 Week 11	Honduras Progreso	0–5	Motagua	El Progreso
15:00		Report	12' 24' Castillo; 21' 81' Moreira; 70' Klusener	Stadium: Estadio Humberto Micheletti; Attendance: Closed gates Referee: Marlon Díaz Starting XI: 25 – Licona; 7 – Izaguirre; 8 – Martínez (substituted off) 68'; 10 – Galvaliz (substituted off) 59'; 12 – Santos; 16 – Castellanos (substituted off) 67'; 17 – Decas; 21 – Moreira; 29 – Castillo (substituted off) 59'; 34 – López (substituted off) 46'; 35 – Meléndez; Substitutes; 44 – Palacios (substituted on) 46'; 9 – Klusener (substituted on) 59'; 4 – Peña (substituted on) 59'; 32 – Núñez (substituted on) 67'; 24 – Elvir (substituted on) 68'
Note: Due to the passing of Hurricane Eta, weeks 11 and 12 were postponed. F.C. Motagua obtained their largest ever victory at this venue. Forward Rubilio Castillo reached 101 goals for the club in all official competitions.

29 November 2020 Week 12	Real España	0–1	Motagua	San Pedro Sula
17:00		Report	44' Klusener; (penalty missed) Castillo	Stadium: Estadio General Francisco Morazán; Attendance: Closed gates Referee: Héctor Rodríguez Starting XI: 19 – Rougier; 5 – Pereira; 8 – Martínez (substituted off) 88'; 9 – Klusener (substituted off) 79'; 10 – Galvaliz (substituted off) 62'; 12 – Santos; 16 – Castellanos; 17 – Decas; 24 – Elvir; 29 – Castillo; 34 – López (substituted off) 78'; Substitutes; 6 – Mayorquín (substituted on) 62'; 21 – Moreira (substituted on) 78'; 27 – Crisanto (substituted on) 79'; 7 – Izaguirre (substituted on) 88'
Note: Due to the passing of Hurricane Eta, weeks 11 and 12 were postponed. F.C. Motagua defeated Real C.D. España in two consecutive away games for the first time since 1998.

15 November 2020 Week 13	Motagua	3–0	Vida	Tegucigalpa
16:00	López 36'; Moreira 42'; Klusener 54'	Report		Stadium: Estadio Tiburcio Carías Andino; Attendance: Closed gates Referee: Óscar Moncada Starting XI: 25 – Licona; 4 – Peña (substituted off) 87'; 7 – Izaguirre; 8 – Martínez (substituted off) 70'; 9 – Klusener (substituted off) 87'; 16 – Castellanos (substituted off) 67'; 17 – Decas; 21 – Moreira; 32 – Núñez; 34 – López (substituted off) 68'; 35 – Meléndez; Substitutes; 6 – Mayorquín (substituted on) 67'; 42 – Álvarez (substituted on) 68'; 15 – Gómez (substituted on) 70'; 44 – Palacios (substituted on) 87'; 54 – Hernández (substituted on) 87'
Note: Youngsters Danilo Palacios and Andy Hernández made their professional debuts wearing jerseys #44 and #54 respectively. With 39 league goals, Paraguayan Roberto Moreira became the foreign player with most goals for Motagua, surpassing Chilean Mario Yubini (38).

12 December 2020 Week 14	Motagua	5–0	Platense	Tegucigalpa
15:00	Meléndez 23'; Castillo 30' (pen.); Castellanos 51'; Moreira 75'; Peña 85'	Report		Stadium: Estadio Tiburcio Carías Andino; Attendance: Closed gates Referee: Melvin Matamoros Starting XI: 19 – Rougier; 5 – Pereira; 8 – Martínez; 11 – Vega (substituted off) 69'; 16 – Castellanos (substituted off) 73'; 17 – Decas; 24 – Elvir (substituted off) 73'; 29 – Castillo (substituted off) 60'; 32 – Núñez; 34 – López (substituted off) 60'; 35 – Meléndez; Substitutes; 21 – Moreira (substituted on) 60'; 27 – Crisanto (substituted on) 60'; 10 – Galvaliz (substituted on) 69'; 7 – Izaguirre (substituted on) 73'; 4 – Peña (substituted on) 73'
Note: Defender Cristopher Meléndez scored his first official goal for the club. F.C. Motagua finished the regular season in 2nd place in their group and qualified to the play-off stage.

17 December 2020 Play-offs	Platense	2–4	Motagua	Puerto Cortés
16:00	Bernárdez 28'; Barahona 84'	Report	8' 63' López; 23' (o.g.) Martínez; 51' Castillo	Stadium: Estadio Excélsior; Attendance: Closed gates Referee: Luís Mejía Starting XI: 19 – Rougier; 5 – Pereira; 7 – Izaguirre (substituted off) 71'; 8 – Martínez (substituted off) 71'; 11 – Vega (substituted off) 74'; 12 – Santos; 16 – Castellanos; 17 – Decas (substituted off) 46'; 24 – Elvir; 29 – Castillo; 34 – López (substituted off) 74'; Substitutes; 35 – Meléndez (substituted on) 46'; 6 – Mayorquín (substituted on) 71'; 10 – Galvaliz (substituted on) 71'; 9 – Klusener (substituted on) 74'; 18 – Crisanto (substituted on) 74'
Note: For the first time in league's history, F.C. Motagua was able to register three consecutive wins at Puerto Cortés.

20 December 2020 Play-offs	Motagua	0–1	Platense	Tegucigalpa
16:00		Report	45+1' (pen.) Bernárdez	Stadium: Estadio Tiburcio Carías Andino; Attendance: Closed gates Referee: Nelson Salgado Starting XI: 19 – Rougier; 5 – Pereira; 9 – Klusener (substituted off) 46'; 10 – Galvaliz (substituted off) 46'; 12 – Santos; 16 – Castellanos; 24 – Elvir; 29 – Castillo (substituted off) 79'; 32 – Núñez (substituted off) 46'; 34 – López (substituted off) 72'; 35 – Meléndez; Substitutes; 4 – Peña (substituted on) 46'; 8 – Martínez (substituted on) 46'; 11 – Vega (substituted on) 46'; 18 – Crisanto (substituted on) 72'; 21 – Moreira (substituted on) 79'
Note: With a 4–3 on aggregate score, F.C. Motagua qualified to the semifinals.

30 December 2020 Semifinals	Motagua	2–0	Marathón	Tegucigalpa
19:00	Castillo 41' (pen.) 74'	Report		Stadium: Estadio Tiburcio Carías Andino; Attendance: Closed gates Referee: Melvin Matamoros Starting XI: 19 – Rougier; 8 – Martínez; 9 – Klusener (substituted off) 72'; 10 – Galvaliz (substituted off) 72'; 12 – Santos; 16 – Castellanos; 17 – Decas; 24 – Elvir; 29 – Castillo (substituted off) 81'; 34 – López (substituted off) 81'; 35 – Meléndez; Substitutes; 7 – Izaguirre (substituted on) 72'; 11 – Vega (substituted on) 72'; 21 – Moreira (substituted on) 81'; 27 – Crisanto (substituted on) 81'
Note: F.C. Motagua and C.D. Marathón will face in semifinals series for the fifth time in history, having won two each in the previous four.

3 January 2021 Semifinals	Marathón	1–2	Motagua	San Pedro Sula
14:00	Volpi 23' (pen.)	Report	8' Vega; 38' López	Stadium: Estadio Yankel Rosenthal; Attendance: Closed gates Referee: Héctor Rodríguez Starting XI: 19 – Rougier; 7 – Izaguirre (substituted off) 75'; 8 – Martínez (substituted off) 84'; 11 – Vega (substituted off) 66'; 12 – Santos; 16 – Castellanos; 17 – Decas; 24 – Elvir; 29 – Castillo (substituted off) 83'; 34 – López (substituted off) 75'; 35 – Meléndez; Substitutes; 21 – Moreira (substituted on) 66'; 18 – Crisanto (substituted on) 75'; 4 – Peña (substituted on) 75'; 9 – Klusener (substituted on) 83'; 10 – Galvaliz (substituted on) 84'
Note: With a 4–1 on aggregate, F.C. Motagua qualified to their 25th final series in league's history.

6 January 2021 Final	Motagua	1–3	Olimpia	Tegucigalpa
19:00	Castillo 48' (pen.)	Report	2' Bengtson; 19' Hernández; 44' (o.g.) Santos	Stadium: Estadio Tiburcio Carías Andino; Attendance: Closed gates Referee: Óscar Moncada Starting XI: 19 – Rougier; 7 – Izaguirre (substituted off) 46'; 8 – Martínez; 11 – Vega (substituted off) 46'; 12 – Santos; 17 – Decas; 24 – Elvir (substituted off) 72'; 29 – Castillo (substituted off) 72'; 32 – Núñez (substituted off) 34'; 34 – López; 35 – Meléndez; Substitutes; 4 – Peña (substituted on) 34'; 9 – Klusener (substituted on) 46'; 10 – Galvaliz (substituted on) 46'; 21 – Moreira (substituted on) 72'; 18 – Crisanto (substituted on) 72'
Note: For the first time in league's history, F.C. Motagua and C.D. Olimpia faced in a series so called "Final de Liguilla" (Playoff Final).

10 January 2021 Final	Olimpia	0–0	Motagua	Tegucigalpa
16:00		Report		Stadium: Estadio Tiburcio Carías Andino; Attendance: Closed gates Referee: Melvin Matamoros Starting XI: 19 – Rougier; 4 – Peña; 8 – Martínez (substituted off) 59'; 10 – Galvaliz (substituted off) 70'; 12 – Santos; 17 – Decas; 21 – Moreira (substituted off) 59'; 24 – Elvir; 29 – Castillo; 34 – López; 35 – Meléndez (substituted off) 46'; Substitutes; 18 – Crisanto (substituted on) 46'; 9 – Klusener (substituted on) 59'; 14 – Méndez (substituted on) 59'; 7 – Izaguirre (substituted on) 70'
Note: With a 1–3 aggregate score, F.C. Motagua failed to advance to the final series.

=== Clausura ===
16 February 2021 Week 1	UPNFM	1–2	Motagua	Tegucigalpa
17:00	Osorio 13' (pen.)	Report	48' Elvir; 77' Vega	Stadium: Estadio Tiburcio Carías Andino; Attendance: Closed gates Referee: Melvin Matamoros Starting XI: 19 – Rougier; 5 – Pereira; 8 – Martínez (substituted off) 46'; 9 – Klusener (substituted off) 83'; 10 – Galvaliz (substituted off) 83'; 12 – Santos; 17 – Decas; 21 – Moreira (substituted off) 69'; 23 – Delgado; 24 – Elvir; 35 – Meléndez (substituted off) 40'; Substitutes; 29 – Fernández (substituted on) 40'; 7 – López (substituted on) 46'; 11 – Vega (substituted on) 69'; 26 – Villafranca (substituted on) 83'; 27 – García (substituted on) 83'
Note: Juan Delgado, Carlos Fernández, Iván López and Óscar García made their official debuts with the club.

20 February 2021 Week 2	Marathón	0–1	Motagua	San Pedro Sula
15:00		Report	40' Moreira	Stadium: Estadio Yankel Rosenthal; Attendance: Closed gates Referee: Armando Castro Starting XI: 19 – Rougier; 2 – Montes; 5 – Pereira; 9 – Klusener (substituted off) 88'; 10 – Galvaliz (substituted off) 77'; 12 – Santos; 21 – Moreira; 23 – Delgado; 24 – Elvir; 27 – García; 29 – Fernández (substituted off) 64'; Substitutes; 22 – Moncada (substituted on) 64'; 7 – López (substituted on) 77'; 26 – Villafranca (substituted on) 88'
Note: Midfielder Jesse Moncada made his official debut with the club. For the first time in league's history, F.C. Motagua defeated C.D. Marathón in four consecutive away games.

24 February 2021 Week 3	Motagua	2–0	Real Sociedad	Tegucigalpa
16:30	Fernández 12'; Galvaliz 55'	Report		Stadium: Estadio Tiburcio Carías Andino; Attendance: Closed gates Referee: Melvin Matamoros Starting XI: 19 – Rougier; 2 – Montes; 8 – Martínez (substituted off) 62'; 9 – Klusener (substituted off) 74'; 10 – Galvaliz (substituted off) 78'; 12 – Santos; 21 – Moreira; 23 – Delgado; 24 – Elvir (substituted off) 74'; 29 – Fernández (substituted off) 74'; 33 – Galindo; Substitutes; 27 – García (substituted on) 62'; 18 – Rodríguez (substituted on) 74'; 11 – Vega (substituted on) 74'; 45 – Flores (substituted on) 74'; 7 – López (substituted on) 78'
Note: Midfielder Diego Rodríguez and youngster Ariel Flores made their official debuts with the club. Carlos Fernández scored his first official goal for the club.

28 February 2021 Week 4	Motagua	1–2	Olimpia	Tegucigalpa
16:00	García 23'	Report	16' García; 35' Pinto	Stadium: Estadio Tiburcio Carías Andino; Attendance: Closed gates Referee: Nelson Salgado Starting XI: 19 – Rougier; 2 – Montes; 5 – Pereira; 9 – Klusener (substituted off) 62'; 10 – Galvaliz (substituted off) 71'; 12 – Santos; 21 – Moreira; 23 – Delgado (substituted off) 71'; 24 – Elvir (substituted off) 46'; 27 – García (substituted off) 46'; 29 – Fernández; Substitutes; 7 – I. López (substituted on) 46'; 34 – K. López (substituted on) 46'; 11 – Vega (substituted on) 62'; 8 – Martínez (substituted on) 71'; 16 – Castellanos (substituted on) 71'
Note: Óscar García scored his first official goal for the club.

3 March 2021 Week 5	Real de Minas	0–3	Motagua	Danlí
15:00		Report	19' Núñez; 20' Vega; 82' López	Stadium: Estadio Marcelo Tinoco; Attendance: Closed gates Referee: Saíd Martínez Starting XI: 19 – Rougier; 2 – Montes; 5 – Pereira; 10 – Galvaliz (substituted off) 46'; 11 – Vega (substituted off) 74'; 12 – Santos; 16 – Castellanos; 18 – Rodríguez (substituted off) 64'; 21 – Moreira (substituted off) 84'; 29 – Fernández (substituted off) 46'; 32 – Núñez; Substitutes; 34 – K. López (substituted on) 46'; 7 – I. López (substituted on) 46'; 3 – Güity (substituted on) 64'; 26 – Villafranca (substituted on) 74'; 9 – Klusener (substituted on) 84'
Note: Midfielder Jonathan Núñez scored his first goal for the club. Defender Elmer Güity made his official debut wearing the jersey number 3.

7 March 2021 Week 6	Motagua	3–1	UPNFM	Tegucigalpa
16:00	Vega 7'; Elvir 45'; Delgado 52'	Report	85' Díaz	Stadium: Estadio Tiburcio Carías Andino; Attendance: Closed gates Referee: Héctor Rodríguez Starting XI: 19 – Rougier; 2 – Montes; 5 – Pereira; 8 – Martínez (substituted off) 69'; 10 – Galvaliz (substituted off) 62'; 11 – Vega (substituted off) 75'; 16 – Castellanos; 21 – Moreira (substituted off) 46'; 24 – Elvir; 29 – Fernández (yellow card) 38' (yellow-red card); 35 – Meléndez; Substitutes; 23 – Delgado (substituted on) 46'; 22 – Moncada (substituted on) 62'; 32 – Núñez (substituted on) 69'; 9 – Klusener (substituted on) 75'
Note: Juan Delgado scored his first official goal for the club.

11 March 2021 Week 7	Motagua	2–0	Marathón	Tegucigalpa
19:00	Moreira 40'; Vega 53'	Report		Stadium: Estadio Tiburcio Carías Andino; Attendance: Closed gates Referee: Armando Castro Starting XI: 19 – Rougier; 2 – Montes; 5 – Pereira; 8 – Martínez (substituted off) 71'; 10 – Galvaliz (substituted off) 75'; 11 – Vega (substituted off) 70'; 12 – Santos; 16 – Castellanos (substituted off) 83'; 18 – Rodríguez; 21 – Moreira (substituted off) 83'; 34 – K. López; Substitutes; 9 – Klusener (substituted on) 70'; 27 – García (substituted on) 71'; 7 – I. López (substituted on) 75'; 23 – Delgado (substituted on) 83'; 22 – Moncada (substituted on) 83'
Note: Forward Marco Vega scored in three consecutive games for the first time while playing for F.C. Motagua.

7 April 2021 Week 8	Real Sociedad	3–3	Motagua	Tocoa
15:15	Martínez 28'; Altamirano 64' (pen.) 71'	Report	8' Martínez; 57' López; 90' Moreira	Stadium: Estadio Francisco Martínez Durón; Attendance: Closed gates Referee: Melvin Matamoros Starting XI: 25 – Licona; 5 – Pereira; 7 – I. López (substituted off) 70'; 8 – Martínez (substituted off) 70'; 11 – Vega (substituted off) 70'; 12 – Santos; 16 – Castellanos (substituted off) 79'; 17 – Decas; 21 – Moreira; 24 – Elvir; 29 – Fernández (substituted off) 52'; Substitutes; 4 – Peña (substituted on) 52'; 26 – Villafranca (substituted on) 70'; 22 – Moncada (substituted on) 70'; 34 – López (substituted on) 70'; 10 – Galvaliz (substituted on) 79'
Note: Due to 10 players from C.D. Real Sociedad resulting COVID-19 positive, this match was postponed from the original kick off day. Midfielder Iván López scored his first official goal for F.C. Motagua. Forward Roberto Moreira reached 100 league appearances with the club.

24 April 2021 Week 9	Olimpia	0–0	Motagua	Tegucigalpa
19:00		Report		Stadium: Estadio Tiburcio Carías Andino; Attendance: Closed gates Referee: Armando Castro Starting XI: 19 – Rougier; 2 – Montes; 5 – Pereira; 10 – Galvaliz (substituted off) 78'; 11 – Vega (substituted off) 78'; 12 – Santos (red card) 19'; 17 – Decas; 21 – Moreira (substituted off) 67'; 23 – Delgado (substituted off) 90+2'; 29 – Fernández (substituted off) 46'; 35 – Meléndez; Substitutes; 34 – K. López (substituted on) 46' (yellow card) 89' (yellow-red card) 90'; 7 – I. López (substituted on) 67'; 14 – Méndez (substituted on) 78'; 9 – Klusener (substituted on) 78'; 4 – Peña (substituted on) 90+2'
Note: This match was postponed due to 4 players from C.D. Olimpia being called to represent Honduras at the 2020 CONCACAF Men's Olympic Qualifying Championship. F.C. Motagua finished the game with nine players after Raúl Santos and Kevin López were sent off.

3 April 2021 Week 10	Motagua	2–2	Real de Minas	Tegucigalpa
16:00	Martínez 54'; Moreira 79'	Report	64' Delgado; 90+4' Moncada	Stadium: Estadio Tiburcio Carías Andino; Attendance: Closed gates Referee: Alex Morazán Starting XI: 19 – Rougier; 2 – Montes; 3 – Güity (substituted off) 76'; 5 – Pereira; 10 – Galvaliz (substituted off) 76'; 11 – Vega (substituted off) 72'; 12 – Santos; 16 – Castellanos; 21 – Moreira; 32 – Núñez (substituted off) 46'; 34 – López (substituted off) 63'; Substitutes; 8 – Martínez (substituted on) 46'; 29 – Fernández (substituted on) 63'; 9 – Klusener (substituted on) 72'; 27 – García (substituted on) 76'; 24 – Elvir (substituted on) 76'
Note: Defender Omar Elvir reached 300 league matches playing for F.C. Motagua.

10 April 2021 Week 11	Motagua	5–2	Honduras Progreso	Tegucigalpa
19:00	Moreira 22' 71'; López 38' 49'; Fernández 75'	Report	34' 59' Agámez	Stadium: Estadio Tiburcio Carías Andino; Attendance: Closed gates Referee: Saíd Martínez Starting XI: 19 – Rougier; 2 – Montes; 7 – I. López (substituted off) 79'; 8 – Martínez (substituted off) 76'; 16 – Castellanos; 17 – Decas; 18 – Rodríguez; 21 – Moreira; 34 – K. López (substituted off) 69'; 35 – Meléndez (substituted off) 46'; 53 – Arriola (substituted off) 46'; Substitutes; 12 – Santos (substituted on) 46'; 32 – Núñez (substituted on) 46'; 29 – Fernández (substituted on) 69'; 10 – Galvaliz (substituted on) 76'; 41 – Ávila (substituted on) 79'
Note: Youngsters Eduardo Arriola and Marvin Ávila made their official debuts for the club wearing jerseys 53 and 41 respectively.

17 April 2021 Week 12	Motagua	1–0	Real España	Tegucigalpa
20:00	Meléndez 87'	Report		Stadium: Estadio Tiburcio Carías Andino; Attendance: Closed gates Referee: Saíd Martínez Starting XI: 19 – Rougier; 5 – Pereira; 7 – I. López (substituted off) 64'; 8 – Martínez (substituted off) 73'; 10 – Galvaliz; 17 – Decas; 18 – Rodríguez; 21 – Moreira (substituted off) 73'; 23 – Delgado (substituted off) 46'; 34 – K. López (substituted off) 64'; 35 – Meléndez; Substitutes; 4 – Peña (substituted on) 46'; 29 – Fernández (substituted on) 64'; 11 – Vega (substituted on) 64'; 22 – Moncada (substituted on) 73'; 9 – Klusener (substituted on) 73'
Note: The last four matches between these two clubs ended with the same score.

21 April 2021 Week 13	Vida	1–1	Motagua	La Ceiba
17:15	Meléndez 82' (o.g.)	Report	22' Peña	Stadium: Estadio Nilmo Edwards; Attendance: Closed gates Referee: Marlon Díaz Starting XI: 19 – Rougier; 4 – Peña; 5 – Pereira; 7 – I. López (substituted off) 73'; 8 – Martínez (substituted off) 78'; 17 – Decas; 21 – Moreira (substituted off) 78'; 24 – Elvir; 29 – Fernández (substituted off) 68'; 32 – Núñez; 35 – Meléndez; Substitutes; 34 – López (substituted on) 68'; 11 – Vega (substituted on) 73'; 26 – Villafranca (substituted on) 78'; 22 – Moncada (substituted on) 78'
Note: Defender Cristopher Meléndez scored his first own goal in his career.

27 April 2021 Week 14	Platense	2–3	Motagua	Puerto Cortés
19:00	Gutiérrez 53'; Romero 90+3'	Report	43' 66' 90' Klusener	Stadium: Estadio Excélsior; Attendance: Closed gates Referee: Martín Ortiz Starting XI: 25 – Licona (substituted off) 68'; 4 – Peña; 6 – Mayorquín; 7 – López (substituted off) 74'; 8 – Martínez (substituted off) 62'; 9 – Klusener; 18 – Rodríguez; 22 – Moncada (substituted off) 62'; 27 – García (substituted off) 62'; 32 – Núñez; 33 – Galindo; Substitutes; 14 – Méndez (substituted on) 62'; 29 – Fernández (substituted on) 62'; 26 – Villafranca (substituted on) 62'; 1 – Caballero (substituted on) 68'; 3 – Güity (substituted on) 74'
Note: Striker Gonzalo Klusener scored his first hat-trick for the club. Goalkeeper Hugo Caballero made his official debut as entering the field as substitute in the second half. With the win, F.C. Motagua increased their record to four consecutive away victories against Platense F.C.

2 May 2021 Play-offs	Vida	1–1	Motagua	La Ceiba
15:06	Palma 57'	Report	86' Moncada	Stadium: Estadio Nilmo Edwards; Attendance: Closed gates Referee: Orlando Hernández Starting XI: 19 – Rougier; 2 – Montes; 4 – Peña (substituted off) 65'; 5 – Pereira; 9 – Klusener (substituted off) 73'; 10 – Galvaliz (substituted off) 74'; 17 – Decas (substituted off) 46'; 21 – Moreira; 23 – Delgado; 29 – Fernández (substituted off) 65'; 35 – Meléndez; Substitutes; 24 – Elvir (substituted on) 46'; 22 – Moncada (substituted on) 65'; 8 – Martínez (substituted on) 65'; 11 – Vega (substituted on) 73'; 7 – López (substituted on) 74'
Note: Midfielder Jesse Moncada scored his first official goal for F.C. Motagua.

4 May 2021 Play-offs	Motagua	3–0	Vida	Tegucigalpa
19:00	López 69'; Mayorquín 78'; Klusener 83'	Report		Stadium: Estadio Tiburcio Carías Andino; Attendance: Closed gates Referee: Jefferson Escobar Starting XI: 19 – Rougier; 2 – Montes; 4 – Peña (substituted off) 74'; 5 – Pereira; 8 – Martínez (substituted off) 60'; 10 – Galvaliz (substituted off) 73'; 11 – Vega (substituted off) 79'; 21 – Moreira; 24 – Elvir; 34 – K. López (substituted off) 79'; 35 – Meléndez; Substitutes; 7 – I. López (substituted on) 60'; 23 – Delgado (substituted on) 73'; 6 – Mayorquín (substituted on) 74'; 9 – Klusener (substituted on) 79'; 22 – Moncada (substituted on) 79'
Note: With a 4–1 on aggregate, F.C. Motagua advanced to their 12th straight semifinal series.

8 May 2021 Semifinals	Motagua	1–0	Real España	Tegucigalpa
20:00	Galvaliz 30'	Report		Stadium: Estadio Tiburcio Carías Andino; Attendance: Closed gates Referee: Óscar Moncada Starting XI: 19 – Rougier; 5 – Pereira; 7 – I. López (substituted off) 69'; 8 – Martínez (substituted off) 77'; 10 – Galvaliz (substituted off) 85'; 17 – Decas; 21 – Moreira (substituted off) 85'; 23 – Delgado; 24 – Elvir; 34 – K. López (substituted off) 77'; 35 – Meléndez; Substitutes; 4 – Peña (substituted on) 69'; 22 – Moncada (substituted on) 77'; 29 – Fernández (substituted on) 77'; 9 – Klusener (substituted on) 85'; 14 – Méndez (substituted on) 85'
Note: The last five games between these two teams ended with a 1–0 victory to F.C. Motagua.

12 May 2021 Semifinals	Real España	1–0 (1–1 agg.) (6–7 p)	Motagua	San Pedro Sula
18:00	Montes 87' (o.g.)	Report		Stadium: Estadio Olímpico Metropolitano; Attendance: Closed gates Referee: Héctor Rodríguez Starting XI: 19 – Rougier; 2 – Montes; 5 – Pereira; 8 – Martínez (substituted off) 62'; 11 – Vega (substituted off) 14'; 12 – Santos (substituted off) 46'; 17 – Decas; 21 – Moreira; 23 – Delgado (substituted off) 77'; 34 – K. López; 35 – Meléndez; Substitutes; 10 – Galvaliz (substituted on) 14' (substituted off) 77'; 16 – Castellanos (substituted on) 46'; 7 – I. López (substituted on) 62'; 29 – Fernández (substituted on) 77'; 6 – Mayorquín (substituted on) 77'
	Penalties
	Martínez (penalty scored); Rocca (penalty scored); Reyes (penalty scored); Vuelto (penalty missed); García (penalty scored); Flores (penalty scored); Montes (penalty scored); Flores (penalty missed)		(penalty scored) Moreira; (penalty missed) López; (penalty scored) Decas; (penalty scored) Castellanos; (penalty scored) Rougier; (penalty scored) Montes; (penalty scored) Fernández; (penalty scored) Pereira
Note: With the away victory in penalty shoot-outs, F.C. Motagua advanced to the 'Playoff Finals' series and qualified to the 2021 CONCACAF League.

16 May 2021 Final	Motagua	2–1	Olimpia	Tegucigalpa
18:00	Moreira 35' (pen.); Villafranca 90+2' (pen.)	Report	(penalty missed) 56' Bengtson	Stadium: Estadio Tiburcio Carías Andino; Attendance: Closed gates Referee: Armando Castro Starting XI: 19 – Rougier; 2 – Montes; 5 – Pereira; 9 – Klusener (substituted off) 70'; 10 – Galvaliz (substituted off) 67'; 12 – Santos; 16 – Castellanos (substituted off) 77'; 17 – Decas; 21 – Moreira (substituted off) 77'; 23 – Delgado; 29 – Fernández (substituted off) 77'; Substitutes; 8 – Martínez (substituted on) 67'; 7 – I. López (substituted on) 70'; 27 – García (substituted on) 77'; 26 – Villafranca (substituted on) 77'; 34 – K. López (substituted on) 77'
Note: With a late penalty in injury time, forward Josué Villafranca scored his first goal since January 2019.

19 May 2021 Final	Olimpia	1–0 (2–2 agg.) (4–3 p)	Motagua	Tegucigalpa
19:00	Bengtson 44'	Report		Stadium: Estadio Tiburcio Carías Andino; Attendance: Closed gates Referee: Saíd Martínez Starting XI: 19 – Rougier; 2 – Montes; 5 – Pereira; 9 – Klusener (substituted off) 62'; 10 – Galvaliz (substituted off) 61'; 12 – Santos; 16 – Castellanos; 17 – Decas; 21 – Moreira; 23 – Delgado (substituted off) 46'; 29 – Fernández (substituted off) 62'; Substitutes; 8 – Martínez (substituted on) 46'; 27 – García (substituted on) 61'; 26 – Villafranca (substituted on) 62'; 34 – López (substituted on) 62'
	Penalties
	Alvarado (penalty scored); Leverón (penalty missed); Hernández (penalty scored); Flores (penalty scored); Bengtson (penalty scored)		(penalty missed) Moreira; (penalty scored) García; (penalty scored) Decas; (penalty scored) Villafranca; (penalty missed) Martínez
Note: This became the second time in history that F.C. Motagua lost a championship in penalty shoot-outs, and the first one against C.D. Olimpia. Midfielder Raúl Santos reached 100 league appearances with the club.

=== CONCACAF League ===
22 October 2020 Preliminary round	Motagua (Honduras)	2–2 (15–14 p)	(Guatemala) Comunicaciones	Tegucigalpa, Honduras
20:30	Galvaliz 55'; López 60'	Report	36' Lezcano; 49' Herrera	Stadium: Estadio Tiburcio Carías Andino; Attendance: Closed gates Referee: Keylor Herrera (CRC) Starting XI: 19 – Rougier; 2 – Montes; 5 – Pereira; 8 – Martínez (substituted off) 75'; 9 – Klusener (substituted off) 46'; 10 – Galvaliz; 12 – Santos (substituted off) 73'; 16 – Castellanos; 21 – Moreira; 24 – Elvir; 34 – López; Substitutes; 29 – Castillo (substituted on) 46'; 18 – Crisanto (substituted on) 73'; 14 – Méndez (substituted on) 75'
	Penalties
	Moreira (penalty scored); Crisanto (penalty scored); Galvaliz (penalty scored); López (penalty missed); Castillo (penalty scored); Méndez (penalty scored); Montes (penalty missed); Izaguirre (penalty scored); Castellanos (penalty scored); Rougier (penalty scored); Moreira (penalty scored); Crisanto (penalty scored); Galvaliz (penalty scored); Castillo (penalty scored); López (penalty scored); Méndez (penalty scored); Izaguirre (penalty missed); Montes (penalty scored)		(penalty scored) Contreras; (penalty missed) Galindo; (penalty scored) Murillo; (penalty scored) Lezcano; (penalty scored) Herrera; (penalty scored) Mejía; (penalty missed) Gordillo; (penalty scored) Grijalva; (penalty scored) Castrillo; (penalty scored) Calderón; (penalty scored) Contreras; (penalty scored) Galindo; (penalty scored) Murillo; (penalty scored) Lezcano; (penalty scored) Herrera; (penalty scored) Mejía; (penalty missed) Gordillo; (penalty missed) Grijalva
Note: F.C. Motagua and Comunicaciones F.C. decided the match in the longest ever penalty shoot-out in CONCACAF's history.

4 November 2020 Round of 16	Alianza (El Salvador)	1–1 (3–4 p)	(Honduras) Motagua	San Salvador, El Salvador
21:30	Zelaya 80' (pen.)	Report	90+1' Castellanos	Stadium: Estadio Cuscatlán; Attendance: Closed gates Referee: John Pitti (PAN) Starting XI: 19 – Rougier; 2 – Montes; 5 – Pereira; 6 – Mayorquín (substituted off) 24'; 7 – Izaguirre; 8 – Martínez (substituted off) 61'; 9 – Klusener (substituted off) 61'; 12 – Santos; 16 – Castellanos; 29 – Castillo; 34 – López; Substitutes; 4 – Peña (substituted on) 24'; 10 – Galvaliz (substituted on) 61'; 21 – Moreira (substituted on) 61'
	Penalties
	Cienfuegos (penalty missed); Mercado (penalty scored); Blanco (penalty missed); Zelaya (penalty scored); Tamacas (penalty scored)		(penalty scored) Moreira; (penalty scored) Galvaliz; (penalty scored) Elvir; (penalty missed) López; (penalty scored) Castillo
Note: F.C. Motagua qualified to their third straight CONCACAF League quarterfinals after defeating Alianza F.C. in penalty shoot-outs. Goalkeeper Jonathan Rougier, saved two penalties.

2 December 2020 Quarterfinals	Olimpia (Honduras)	2–0	(Honduras) Motagua	Tegucigalpa, Honduras
21:15	Núñez 32'; Flores 54'	Report		Stadium: Estadio Tiburcio Carías Andino; Attendance: Closed gates Referee: Adonai Escobedo (MEX) Starting XI: 19 – Rougier; 6 – Mayorquín (substituted off) 46'; 7 – Izaguirre (substituted off) 69'; 10 – Galvaliz (substituted off) 76'; 12 – Santos; 16 – Castellanos; 17 – Decas; 21 – Moreira (substituted off) 23'; 29 – Castillo; 34 – López (substituted off) 70'; 35 – Meléndez; Substitutes; 8 – Martínez (substituted on) 23'; 9 – Klusener (substituted on) 46' (yellow card) 63' (yellow-red card) 81'; 24 – Elvir (substituted on) 69'; 14 – Méndez (substituted on) 70'; 27 – Crisanto (substituted on) 76'
Note: F.C. Motagua and C.D. Olimpia faced in international contention for third time in history, the first two being played back in 1979. With the loss, Motagua failed to qualify to their third straight CONCACAF League semifinals.

9 December 2020 Play-in round	Motagua (Honduras)	2–2 (2–4 p)	(Nicaragua) Real Estelí	Tegucigalpa, Honduras
21:00	López 37'; Galvaliz 52' (pen.)	Report	64' Barrera; 89' Mercado	Stadium: Estadio Tiburcio Carías Andino; Attendance: Closed gates Referee: Keylor Herrera (CRC) Starting XI: 25 – Licona; 5 – Pereira; 7 – Izaguirre (substituted off) 85'; 10 – Galvaliz (substituted off) 80'; 11 – Vega; 12 – Santos (substituted off) 86'; 16 – Castellanos (substituted off) 90+1'; 17 – Decas; 24 – Elvir; 34 – López; 35 – Meléndez; Substitutes; 14 – Méndez (substituted on) 80' (substituted off) 90+1'; 6 – Mayorquín (substituted on) 85'; 27 – F. Crisanto (substituted on) 86'; 4 – Peña (substituted on) 90+1'; 18 – W. Crisanto (substituted on) 90+1'
	Penalties
	Crisanto (penalty scored); Méndez (penalty scored); Elvir (penalty missed); Peña (penalty missed)		(penalty scored) Rosas; (penalty scored) Rodríguez; (penalty scored) Acuña; (penalty scored) López
Note: With the lost on penalty shoot-outs, F.C. Motagua failed to qualify to their second straight CONCACAF Champions League.

=== By round ===
Round	1	2	3	4	5	6	7	8	9	10	11	12	13	14	15	16	17	18	19	20	21	22	23	24	25	26	27	28
Ground	A	A	H	H	A	H	H	A	A	H	A	A	H	H	A	A	H	H	A	H	H	A	A	H	H	H	A	A
Result	W	W	W	D	W	L	D	W	L	W	W	W	W	W	W	W	W	L	W	W	W	D	D	D	W	W	D	W
Position	1	1	1	1	1	2	1	1	1	1	1	1	1	2	2	2	2	2	2	2	2	2	2	2	2	2	2	2

A = Away; H = Home; W = Win; D = Draw; L = Loss; P = Postponed

== Statistics ==
- As of 19 May 2021

Competition	GP	GW	GD	GL	GF	GA	GD	CS	SG	Per
League	40	25	8	7	78	35	+43	16	7	69.17%
CONCACAF League	4	0	3	1	5	7	–2	0	1	25.00%
Others	5	5	0	0	23	5	+18	1	0	100.00%
Totals	49	30	11	8	106	47	+59	17	8	68.71%
