= Lucas Baldunciel =

Argentine professional footballer

Personal information
- Full name: Lucas David Baldunciel
- Date of birth: 22 March 1992 (age 34)
- Place of birth: Buenos Aires, Argentina
- Height: 1.68 m (5 ft 6 in)
- Position: Forward

Team information
- Current team: San Telmo

Youth career
- Nueva Chicago

Senior career*
Years	Team	Apps	(Gls)
2013–2018	Nueva Chicago	104	(9)
2018–2019	Gimnasia Mendoza	23	(3)
2019–2021	Temperley	40	(3)
2021	Real Tomayapo	16	(0)
2022	Motagua	12	(0)
2022–2025	Temperley	80	(3)
2025–2026	Almagro	21	(0)
2026–	San Telmo	1	(0)
- * Club domestic league appearances and goals as of 16:59, 6 May 2026 (UTC)

Lucas David Baldunciel (born 22 March 1992) is an Argentine professional footballer who plays as a forward for San Telmo.

== Career ==
Baldunciel started his career with Nueva Chicago of Primera B Nacional. His professional debut, against Huracán on 7 April 2013, was one of three appearances he made during the 2012–13 Primera B Nacional, which ended with relegation to Primera B Metropolitana. Baldunciel scored his first goal in the next December, netting in a 2–0 win over Colegiales; with a goal versus Atlanta following in February 2014 as Nueva Chicago were promoted back to tier two. He stayed with the club for a total of seven seasons, one of which was in the Primera División after 2014 promotion, whilst scoring ten goals in one hundred and six matches.

On 30 June 2018, Baldunciel departed Nueva Chicago to sign for fellow Primera B Nacional team Gimnasia y Esgrima. His opening goals for them arrived in December against Olimpo and Atlético de Rafaela.

== Career statistics ==
As of 17 January 2019.

Club statistics
Club	Season	League			Cup		Continental		Other		Total	
Club	Season	Division	Apps	Goals	Apps	Goals	Apps	Goals	Apps	Goals	Apps	Goals
Nueva Chicago	2012–13	Primera B Nacional	3	0	0	0	—		0	0	3	0
Nueva Chicago	2013–14	Primera B Metropolitana	19	2	0	0	—		0	0	19	2
Nueva Chicago	2014	Primera B Nacional	5	0	0	0	—		0	0	5	0
Nueva Chicago	2015	Primera División	23	1	2	1	—		0	0	25	2
Nueva Chicago	2016	Primera B Nacional	14	2	0	0	—		0	0	14	2
Nueva Chicago	2016–17	Primera B Nacional	20	0	0	0	—		0	0	20	0
Nueva Chicago	2017–18	Primera B Nacional	20	4	0	0	—		0	0	20	4
Nueva Chicago	Total		104	9	2	1	—		0	0	106	10
Gimnasia y Esgrima	2018–19	Primera B Nacional	11	2	0	0	—		0	0	11	2
Career total			115	11	2	1	—		0	0	117	12

== Honours ==
Nueva Chicago

- Primera B Metropolitana: 2013–14
