= Franco Olego =

Argentine footballer

Personal information
- Full name: Franco Leonel Olego
- Date of birth: 4 May 1987 (age 39)
- Place of birth: Ramallo, Buenos Aires, Argentina
- Height: 1.78 m (5 ft 10 in)
- Position: Striker

Team information
- Current team: Douglas Haig
- Number: 9

Youth career
- San Lorenzo
- Defensores de Belgrano VR

Senior career*
Years	Team	Apps	(Gls)
2007–2014	Defensores de Belgrano VR	115	(39)
2012–2013	→ Talleres (loan)	26	(10)
2014–2015	All Boys	45	(12)
2016	Atlanta	17	(7)
2016–2017	Jorge Wilstermann	26	(8)
2017	Instituto	7	(1)
2018	Mitre	5	(1)
2018–2019	Defensores de Belgrano VR	29	(20)
2019–2020	Deportes La Serena	16	(5)
2020	Deportes Temuco	8	(0)
2021	LDU Portoviejo	22	(13)
2021	Olimpo	6	(3)
2022	Motagua	13	(2)
2022–2023	Sarmiento de Resistencia	44	(21)
2023	Atlético Carcarañá	3	(3)
2024–	Douglas Haig	4	(2)
- * Club domestic league appearances and goals as of 21 April 2024

Franco Leonel Olego (born 4 May 1987) is an Argentine footballer who plays as a striker for Douglas Haig.

== Club career ==
Born in Ramallo, Buenos Aires, Argentina, Olego was with San Lorenzo before joining and starting his career with Defensores de Belgrano de Villa Ramallo from Torneo Argentino C to Torneo Argentino A. In 2012–13, he was loaned out to Talleres de Cordoba, with whom he got promotion to the 2013–14 Primera B Nacional.

From 2014 to 2016, Olego played for All Boys and Atlanta.

In June 2016, he had his first experience abroad by signing with Jorge Wilstermann in the Bolivian top level.

In 2017, he returned to Argentina and joined Instituto de Córdoba. Subsequently, he played for Mitre and Defensores de Belgrano de Villa Ramallo.

In 2019, he moved abroad by second time and signed with Chilean club Deportes La Serena. In November 2020, he switched to Deportes Temuco until the end of the season.

In March 2021, Olego moved to Ecuador and signed with LDU Portoviejo. In September of the same year, he returned to his homeland and joined Olimpo.

In 2022, he had a brief stint with Motagua in the Liga Nacional de Honduras.

In the second half of 2022, he returned again to Argentina and joined Sarmiento de Resistencia. In the second half of 2023, he had a brief stint with Atlético Carcarañá.

In 2024, he signed with Douglas Haig.
