= Fernando Mercado =

American soccer player (born 1994)

Fernando Jr Mercado
Personal information
- Full name: Fernando Jr Mercado Villar
- Date of birth: 4 December 1994 (age 31)
- Place of birth: California, United States
- Height: 1.73 m (5 ft 8 in)
- Position: Midfielder

Youth career
- 2009–2013: USSDA
- 2014: Mérida
- 2015–2017: Inter Playa del Carmen
- 2016: Real Valladolid B
- 2017: Irapuato F.C.

Senior career*
Years	Team	Apps	(Gls)
2018	Venados F.C.	2	(0)
- * Club domestic league appearances and goals as of August 14, 2018

Fernando Jr Mercado Villar (born 4 December 1994) is an American former soccer player who last played as a midfielder for Venados F.C.
