= Diego Auzqui =

Argentine footballer

Personal information
- Full name: Diego Orlando Auzqui
- Date of birth: 19 October 1989 (age 37)
- Place of birth: Buenos Aires, Argentina
- Height: 1.74 m (5 ft 9 in)
- Position: Midfielder

Team information
- Current team: Platense FC

Youth career
- Estudiantes LP

Senior career*
| Years | Team | Apps | (Gls) |
| 2010–2012 | Estudiantes LP | 5 | (0) |
| 2012–2013 | Nueva Chicago | 7 | (0) |
| 2013–2014 | San Luis | 20 | (1) |
| 2014 | Victoria | 15 | (0) |
| 2015 | Villa San Carlos | 10 | (0) |
| 2016 | Fénix | 19 | (2) |
| 2016–2018 | Gimnasia de Jujuy | 63 | (2) |
| 2019 | Gimnasia de Mendoza | 9 | (1) |
| 2019–2020 | Mitre | 12 | (0) |
| 2020–2021 | Sacachispas | 20 | (2) |
| 2021–2022 | Motagua | 31 | (1) |
| 2022 | Sacachispas | 14 | (0) |
| 2023 | Sarmiento de Resistencia | 14 | (0) |
| 2023–2024 | Atlético Independiente | – | (–) |
| 2024– | Platense FC | – | (–) |
- * Club domestic league appearances and goals as of 21 October 2024

Diego Orlando Auzqui (born October 19, 1989, in Buenos Aires, Argentina) is an Argentine footballer currently playing for Platense FC in the Honduran Liga de Ascenso.

== Teams ==
- (Argentina) Estudiantes de La Plata 2009–2012
- (Argentina) Nueva Chicago 2012–2013
- (Chile) San Luis de Quillota 2013–2014
- (Honduras) Victoria 2014
- (Argentina) Villa San Carlos 2015
- (Argentina) Fénix 2016
- (Argentina) Gimnasia y Esgrima de Jujuy 2016–2018
- (Argentina) Gimnasia y Esgrima de Mendoza 2019
- (Argentina) Mitre 2019–2020
- (Argentina) Sacachispas 2020–2021
- (Honduras) Motagua 2021–2022
- (Argentina) Sacachispas 2022
- (Argentina) Sarmiento de Resistencia 2023
- (Honduras) Atlético Independiente 2023–2024
- (Honduras) Platense 2024–Present

== Personal life ==
Diego is the older brother of Carlos Auzqui.

== Titles ==
- Estudiantes de La Plata 2009 (Copa Libertadores de América), 2010 (Torneo Apertura Primera División Argentina Championship)
- (Honduras) Motagua 2021–2022 Clausura
