= Carlos Fernández (footballer, born 1992) =

Honduran footballer

Personal information
- Full name: Carlos Roberto Fernández Martínez
- Date of birth: 17 February 1992 (age 34)
- Place of birth: Triunfo de la Cruz, Honduras
- Height: 1.80 m (5 ft 11 in)
- Position: Winger

Senior career*
Years	Team	Apps	(Gls)
2011	Atlético Esperanzano		
2012	Deportivo La Gomera		
2013	Deportivo Quiriguá		
2013	Zacapa		
2014–2016	Santa Lucía		
2016	Siquinalá		
2017	Santa Lucía		
2018–2019	Cerro Largo	37	(4)
2020	Fénix	17	(2)
2021	Motagua	18	(2)
2022	Venados	3	(1)
2022	C.D.S. Vida	16	(2)
2022-2023	Guastatoya	24	(2)
- * Club domestic league appearances and goals as of 09:33, 2 July 2021 (UTC)

Carlos Fernández (born 17 February 1992) is a Honduran footballer who plays as a winger.
