= Óscar García (footballer, born 1990) =

Honduran footballer

Personal information
- Full name: Óscar Alberto García Fernández
- Date of birth: 16 May 1990 (age 36)
- Place of birth: Tegucigalpa, Honduras
- Height: 1.72 m (5 ft 8 in)
- Position: Midfielder

Team information
- Current team: Motagua
- Number: 27

Senior career*
Years	Team	Apps	(Gls)
2009–2011	Olimpia		
2011–2016	→ Deportes Savio	32	(1)
2016–2018	Gimnástico		
2019–2020	Real de Minas	52	(6)
2021–	Motagua	9	(1)
- * Club domestic league appearances and goals as of 19 May 2021

Óscar Alberto García Fernández (born 16 May 1990) is a Honduran professional footballer who plays as a midfielder for Motagua in the Liga Nacional de Fútbol Profesional de Honduras.

He signed with Motagua in January 2021.
