= Jonathan Núñez (Honduran footballer) =

Honduran footballer (born 2001)

Personal information
- Full name: Jonathan Adid Núñez García
- Date of birth: 26 November 2001 (age 24)
- Place of birth: La Ceiba, Honduras
- Height: 1.78 m (5 ft 10 in)
- Position: Midfielder

Team information
- Current team: Motagua
- Number: 23

Youth career
- –2019: Motagua

Senior career*
Years	Team	Apps	(Gls)
2019–	Motagua	119	(4)
2026–	→ Platense (loan)	0	(0)

International career^{‡}
2018–2019	Honduras U20	5	(0)
2021	Honduras U23	5	(0)
- * Club domestic league appearances and goals as of 5 January 2026 ‡ National team caps and goals as of 19:41, 16 November 2025 (UTC)

Jonathan Adid Núñez García (born 26 November 2001) is a Honduran professional footballer who plays as a midfielder for Motagua.

== Career statistics ==
=== Club ===
As of 16 November 2025

Club	Season	League			Cup		Continental		Other		Total	
Club	Season	Division	Apps	Goals	Apps	Goals	Apps	Goals	Apps	Goals	Apps	Goals
Motagua	2018–19	Honduran Liga Nacional	2	0	0	0	–		0	0	2	0
Motagua	2019–20	Honduran Liga Nacional	5	0	0	0	0	0	0	0	5	0
Motagua	2020–21	Honduran Liga Nacional	13	1	0	0	0	0	2	0	15	1
Motagua	2021–22	Honduran Liga Nacional	16	0	0	0	3	0	7	0	26	0
Motagua	2022–23	Honduran Liga Nacional	29	2	0	0	9	0	6	0	44	2
Motagua	2023–24	Honduran Liga Nacional	2	0	0	0	0	0	0	0	2	0
Motagua	2024–25	Honduran Liga Nacional	19	0	0	0	4	0	4	0	27	0
Motagua	2025–26	Honduran Liga Nacional	10	1	0	0	3	0	0	0	13	1
Career total			96	4	0	0	19	0	19	0	134	4

== Honours ==
Motagua

- Honduran Liga Nacional: 2018–19 Clausura, 2021–22 Clausura
