= Josué Villafranca =

Honduran footballer (born 1999)

Personal information
- Full name: Josué Isaias Villafranca Quiñónez
- Date of birth: 16 December 1999 (age 26)
- Place of birth: Danlí, Honduras
- Height: 1.87 m (6 ft 2 in)
- Position: Forward

Team information
- Current team: Limperpérez FC

Youth career
- –2019: Motagua

Senior career*
Years	Team	Apps	(Gls)
2019–2023	Motagua	45	(7)
2019	→ Real de Minas (loan)	0	(0)
2019	→ Vida (loan)	18	(9)
2020	→ Intercity (loan)	0	(0)
2022	Victoria	17	(3)
2023–	Vida	11	(3)

International career^{‡}
- Honduras U17
2018–2019	Honduras U20	14	(8)
- * Club domestic league appearances and goals as of 19 May 2021 ‡ National team caps and goals as of 17:14, 12 July 2020 (UTC)

Josué Isaias Villafranca Quiñónez (born 16 December 1999) is a Honduran footballer currently playing as a forward for Limberpérez FC on loan from F.C. Motagua.

== Career statistics ==
=== Club ===
As of 12 July 2020.

Club	Season	League			Cup		Continental		Other		Total	
Club	Season	Division	Apps	Goals	Apps	Goals	Apps	Goals	Apps	Goals	Apps	Goals
Motagua	2018–19	Liga Salva-Vida	5	1	0	0	–		0	0	2	0
Motagua	2019–20	Liga Salva-Vida	2	0	0	0	0	0	0	0	2	0
Motagua	Total		7	1	0	0	0	0	0	0	2	0
Real de Minas (loan)	2019–20	Liga Salva-Vida	0	0	0	0	–		0	0	0	0
Vida (loan)	2019–20	Liga Salva-Vida	18	9	0	0	–		0	0	18	9
Career total			25	10	0	0	0	0	0	0	25	10
