= Matías Galvaliz =

Argentine footballer

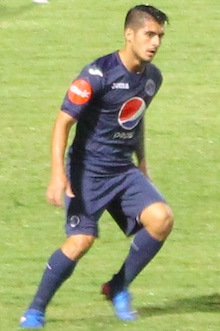
- Galvaliz with Motagua in 2018

Personal information
- Full name: Matías Alejandro Galvaliz
- Date of birth: 6 June 1989 (age 37)
- Place of birth: Rosario, Argentina
- Height: 1.70 m (5 ft 7 in)
- Position: Attacking midfielder

Senior career*
Years	Team	Apps	(Gls)
2011–2014	Rosario Central	1	(0)
2012–2013	→ Huracán Comodoro (loan)		
2013–2014	→ Tiro Federal (loan)	17	(4)
2014	San Martín Tucumán	8	(0)
2015	Mitre	24	(4)
2016	Acassuso	6	(2)
2016–2017	Guillermo Brown	18	(0)
2017–2018	Defensores Belgrano VR	22	(3)
2018–2021	Motagua	97	(8)
2021-2023	Guastatoya	66	(7)
- * Club domestic league appearances and goals as of 20 May 2021

Matías Alejandro Galvaliz (born 6 June 1989) is an Argentine professional footballer who plays as an attacking midfielder.

== Early life ==
Galvaliz was born in Rosario, Argentina.

== Club career ==
=== Motagua ===
On 25 June 2018, Galvaliz signed with Honduran Liga Nacional side Motagua. He made 27 league and seven playoff appearances that season as Motagua won both the Apertura and Clausura. Galvaliz also made seven appearances in CONCACAF League play, scoring one goal and helping Motagua to a runner-up finish.

In the 2019–20 season, Galvaliz made 22 league appearances, scoring three goals, and another four appearances in the Apertura playoffs. He made another seven appearances in CONCACAF League that year, helping Motagua to another runner-up finish and qualification to CONCACAF Champions League.

On 8 May 2020, Galvaliz re-signed with the club for another year.

== Career statistics ==
As of 20 May 2021

Club statistics
Club	Season	League			National Cup (Note: Includes appearances in the Copa Argentina.)		Continental (Note: Includes appearances in CONCACAF League and CONCACAF Champions League.)		Other (Note: Includes appearances in the Torneo Argentino A final stages, Torneo Federal A final stages and Honduran Liga Nacional playoffs.)		Total	
Club	Season	Division	Apps	Goals	Apps	Goals	Apps	Goals	Apps	Goals	Apps	Goals
Rosario Central	2011–12	Primera B Nacional	1	0	0	0	—		0	0	1	0
Tiro Federal (loan)	2013–14	Torneo Argentino A	17	4	1	0	—		6	0	24	4
San Martín Tucumán	2014	Torneo Federal A	8	0	3	0	—		0	0	11	0
Mitre	2015	Torneo Federal A	24	4	0	0	—		2	1	26	5
Acassuso	2016	Primera B Metropolitana	6	2	0	0	—		0	0	6	2
Guillermo Brown	2016–17	Primera B Nacional	18	0	1	0	—		0	0	19	0
Defensores Belgrano VR	2017–18	Torneo Federal A	22	3	2	0	—		5	1	29	4
Motagua	2018–19	Honduran Liga Nacional	27	1	—		7	1	7	1	41	3
Motagua	2019–20	Honduran Liga Nacional	22	3	—		7	0	4	1	33	4
Motagua	2020–21	Honduran Liga Nacional	23	1	—		6	2	11	1	40	4
Motagua	Total		72	5	0	0	20	3	22	3	114	11
Career total			168	18	7	0	20	3	35	5	230	26
