= Marcelo Pereira =

Honduran footballer (born 1995)

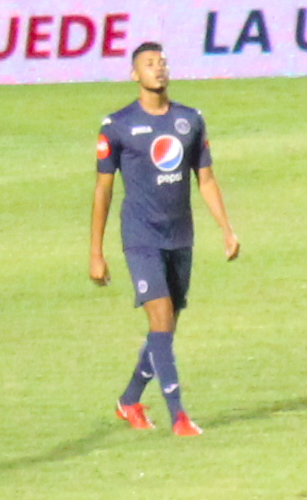
- Pereira playing for Motagua in 2018

Personal information
- Full name: Marcelo Antonio Pereira Rodríguez
- Date of birth: 27 May 1995 (age 31)
- Place of birth: Tegucigalpa, Honduras
- Height: 1.82 m (5 ft 11 1/2 in)
- Position: Centre-back

Team information
- Current team: Cartaginés
- Number: 5

Youth career
- Olimpia
- 2013–2014: Motagua

Senior career*
Years	Team	Apps	(Gls)
2014–2024	Motagua	198	(13)
2024–	Cartaginés	31	(2)

International career^{‡}
2015–2016	Honduras U20	2	(0)
2015–2018	Honduras U23	10	(2)
2016–	Honduras	30	(0)
- * Club domestic league appearances and goals as of 7 May 2025 ‡ National team caps and goals as of 3 September 2023

Marcelo Antonio Pereira Rodríguez (born 27 May 1995) is a Honduran professional footballer who plays as a centre-back for Costa Rican Liga FPD club Cartaginés and the Honduras national team.

== Club career ==
In 2013, Pereira joined Motagua from Olimpia. He was assigned to their reserves and made his senior debut with the first team during the 2014–15 season.

== International career ==
Pereira got his first call up to the senior Honduras side for a friendly against Belize in October 2016.
