= Walter Martínez (footballer, born 1991) =

Honduran footballer

Personal information
- Full name: Walter Joel Martínez Betanco
- Date of birth: 26 March 1991 (age 35)
- Place of birth: Tegucigalpa, Honduras
- Height: 1.75 m (5 ft 9 in)
- Position: Midfielder

Team information
- Current team: Motagua
- Number: 8

Senior career*
Years	Team	Apps	(Gls)
2010–2012	Necaxa	19	(2)
2012	Real España	2	(0)
2012–2014	Vida	35	(4)
2014–2015	Atlético Independiente	?	(?)
2015–2017	Marathón	68	(12)
2017–	Motagua	240	(23)

International career^{‡}
2017–	Honduras	4	(0)
- * Club domestic league appearances and goals as of 29 November 2024 ‡ National team caps and goals as of 7 June 2021

Walter Martínez (born 26 March 1991) is a Honduran professional footballer who plays for Motagua in the Liga Nacional de Honduras.

On 28 May 2018 Martinez made his senior debut for the Honduras national football team against South Korea.
