= Jonathan Rougier (footballer) =

Argentine footballer

Personal information
- Full name: Jonathan Felipe Rougier
- Date of birth: 29 October 1987 (age 39)
- Place of birth: Villa Elisa, Argentina
- Height: 1.90 m (6 ft 3 in)
- Position: Goalkeeper

Team information
- Current team: Racing Córdoba

Youth career
- Colón

Senior career*
Years	Team	Apps	(Gls)
2009–2011	Boca Unidos	0	(0)
2011–2012	Textil Mandiyú	7	(0)
2012–2016	Defensores	102	(0)
2017–2025	Motagua	248	(1)
2025–	Racing Córdoba	0	(0)

International career
2024–	Honduras	1	(0)
- * Club domestic league appearances and goals as of 17:14, 15 August 2025 (UTC)

Jonathan Felipe Rougier (born 29 October 1987) is an Argentine-Honduran football player who plays as a goalkeeper for Primera Nacional club Racing Córdoba. Born in Argentina, he represents the Honduras national team.

== Club career ==
Rougier was promoted from Club Atlético Colón to Primera B Nacional side Boca Unidos in 2009 by coach Frank Kudelka. By 2011, he was transferred to Textil Mandiyú and to Club Defensores de Pronunciamiento in 2012 where he gained promotion to Torneo Federal A.

His first international experience was with Honduran club F.C. Motagua in 2017, winning a league title immediately. He also won the best goalkeeper award in Honduras in 2018. Later that year, he was included in the list for Goalkeeper of the Year at the 2018 CONCACAF Awards.

== International career ==
Rougier made his debut for Honduras national football team on 23 March 2024 in the 2024 Copa América qualifying match against Costa Rica.

== Honours ==
=== Individual ===
- CONCACAF League Golden Glove: 2019
