= Diego Rodríguez (footballer, born 1995) =

Honduran footballer

Personal information
- Full name: Diego Fernando Rodríguez López
- Date of birth: 6 November 1995 (age 31)
- Place of birth: Tegucigalpa, Honduras
- Height: 1.67 m (5 ft 6 in)
- Position: Left-back

Team information
- Current team: Motagua
- Number: 18

Senior career*
Years	Team	Apps	(Gls)
2017–2018	Olimpia	4	(0)
2018–2021	Real de Minas	49	(11)
2021–	Motagua	17	(1)

International career^{‡}
2021–	Honduras	14	(1)
- * Club domestic league appearances and goals as of 02:17, 26 January 2022 (UTC) ‡ National team caps and goals as of 19 January 2022

Diego Fernando Rodríguez López (born 6 November 1995) is a Honduran professional footballer who plays as a left-back for Motagua and the Honduras national team.

== Career ==
Rodríguez made his professional debut with Olimpia in a 0–0 Liga Nacional tie with C.D.S. Vida on 14 August 2017. On 15 January 2021, he signed with Motagua.

== International career ==
Rodríguez made his senior debut with the Honduras national team in a friendly 1–1 tie with Belarus on 24 March 2021.
