= Cristopher Meléndez =

Honduran footballer (born 1997)

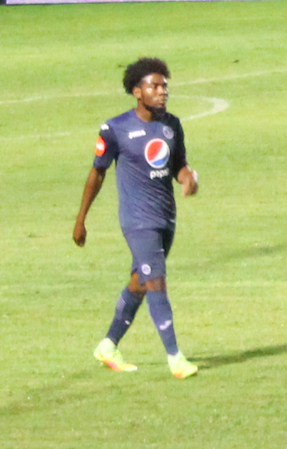

Personal information
- Full name: Cristopher Aarón Meléndez Suazo
- Date of birth: 25 November 1997 (age 28)
- Place of birth: La Ceiba, Honduras
- Height: 1.72 m (5 ft 8 in)
- Position: Right-back

Team information
- Current team: Motagua
- Number: 35

Youth career
- Motagua

Senior career*
Years	Team	Apps	(Gls)
2016–	Motagua	188	(6)
2023	→ UPNFM (loan)	16	(0)

International career^{‡}
2019–2021	Honduras U23	9	(0)
2021–	Honduras	7	(0)
Medal record
Men's football
Representing Honduras
Pan American Games
Silver medal – second place	2019 Lima	Team
- * Club domestic league appearances and goals as of 7 June 2026 ‡ National team caps and goals as of 7 June 2026

Cristopher Aarón Meléndez Suazo (born 25 November 1997) is a Honduran professional footballer who plays as a right-back for Liga Nacional club Motagua and the Honduras national team.

== International career ==
He made his debut for Honduras national football team on 12 November 2021 in a World Cup qualifier against Panama.

== Honours ==
Honduras Youth

- Pan American Silver Medal: 2019
