= Juan Delgado (footballer, born 1992) =

Honduran footballer

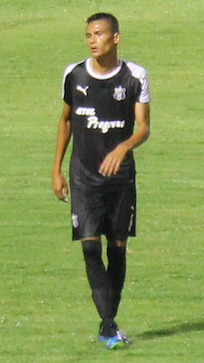

Personal information
- Full name: Juan Ángel Delgado Murillo
- Date of birth: 21 July 1992 (age 34)
- Place of birth: San Manuel, Honduras
- Height: 1.78 m (5 ft 10 in)
- Position: Midfielder

Team information
- Current team: Motagua
- Number: 23

Senior career*
Years	Team	Apps	(Gls)
2014–2021	Honduras Progreso	214	(11)
2021–	Motagua	14	(1)

International career^{‡}
2021–	Honduras	5	(0)
- * Club domestic league appearances and goals as of 03:44, 6 July 2021 (UTC) ‡ National team caps and goals as of 06:48, 25 March 2022 (UTC)

Juan Ángel Delgado Murillo (born 21 July 1992) is a Honduran professional footballer who plays as a midfielder for Motagua.

== Career ==
Delgado began his career with Honduras Progreso in 2012. He made his professional debut with Progreso in a 2–0 Liga Nacional win over Olimpia on 2 August 2014. After years as a staple to Progreso's side, he transferred to Motagua in February 2021.

== International career ==
Delgado was called up to represent Honduras at the 2021 CONCACAF Gold Cup.

== Personal life ==
Delgado is the brother of the Honduras international footballer Edder Delgado.
