= Marcelo Santos (Honduran footballer) =

Honduran footballer (born 1992)

Raúl Santos
Personal information
- Full name: Raúl Marcelo Santos Colindres
- Date of birth: 2 August 1992 (age 34)
- Place of birth: La Ceiba, Honduras
- Height: 1.81 m (5 ft 11 in)
- Position: Defender

Team information
- Current team: Motagua
- Number: 12

Senior career*
Years	Team	Apps	(Gls)
2013–2017	Vida	111	(5)
2017–	Motagua	100	(0)

International career^{‡}
2020–	Honduras	6	(0)
- * Club domestic league appearances and goals as of 19 May 2021 ‡ National team caps and goals as of 06:37, 25 March 2022 (UTC)

Raúl Marcelo Santos Colindres (born 3 August 1992) is a Honduran footballer who plays as a defender for Motagua.

== Club career ==
=== Motagua ===
In July 2017, Santos moved to Motagua. He made his league debut for the club on 27 August 2017, coming on as a 76th-minute substitute for Erick Andino in a 3–2 away victory over Honduras Progreso. In June 2019, Santos signed a contract extension with the club.

== International career ==
He made his national team debut on 10 October 2020 in a friendly against Nicaragua.

== Personal life ==
In November 2016, Santos was falsely arrested on drug trafficking charges while visiting his mother. He was released shortly after being arrested, as he wasn't involved in the operation.
