= Gonzalo Klusener =

Argentine footballer (born 1983)

Personal information
- Full name: Gonzalo Martín Klusener
- Date of birth: 21 October 1983 (age 43)
- Place of birth: Oberá, Argentina
- Height: 6 ft 1 in (1.85 m)
- Position: Forward

Team information
- Current team: F.A.D.E.P

Youth career
- Estudiantes LP

Senior career*
Years	Team	Apps	(Gls)
2003–2004	Estudiantes LP	5	(3)
2004–2005	Defensa y Justicia	9	(5)
2005	Estudiantes LP	3	(1)
2006	Antofagasta	?	(3)
2007	Defensa y Justicia	15	(3)
2007–2008	Ben Hur	36	(6)
2008–2009	Almagro	33	(5)
2009–2010	Thrasyvoulos	?	(2)
2010–2011	Unión MdP	?	(21)
2011–2012	Guillermo Brown	26	(10)
2012–2014	Talleres de Córdoba	66	(43)
2014–2015	Quilmes	19	(4)
2015–2016	Olimpo	38	(5)
2016–2017	Talleres de Córdoba	25	(6)
2017–2018	Atlético de Rafaela	21	(6)
2018–2019	Agropecuario	15	(1)
2019	Independiente Rivadavia	11	(5)
2020–2021	Motagua	64	(20)
2022	Atlanta	32	(6)
2023	Deportivo Maipú	36	(6)
2024	San Martín Tucumán	31	(3)
2025	Arsenal Sarandí	17	(2)
2025–	F.A.D.E.P		
- * Club domestic league appearances and goals as of 21:54, 14 January 2026 (UTC)

Gonzalo Martín Klusener (born 21 October 1983) is an Argentine footballer currently playing for F.A.D.E.P, which disputes the Torneo Regional Federal Amateur and the Liga Mendocina de Fútbol.
