= Iván López (footballer, born 1990) =

Honduran footballer

Personal information
- Full name: Iván Edgardo López Cano
- Date of birth: 5 October 1990 (age 36)
- Place of birth: San Pedro Sula, Honduras
- Height: 1.69 m (5 ft 7 in)
- Position: Midfielder

Team information
- Current team: Motagua
- Number: 7

Youth career
- Platense Junior

Senior career*
Years	Team	Apps	(Gls)
- Villanueva
- Yoro
2014–2015	Parrillas One	35	(16)
2016–2021	Real España	118	(25)
2021–	Motagua	17	(3)

International career^{‡}
2018–	Honduras	3	(0)
- * Club domestic league appearances and goals as of 19 May 2021 ‡ National team caps and goals as of 14:25, 19 January 2022 (UTC)

Iván Edgardo López Cano (born 5 October 1990) is a Honduran footballer who plays as a midfielder for F.C. Motagua and the Honduras national team.

== Club career ==
López had a youth stint with Platense Junior, before playing at senior level in tier two for Villanueva and Yoro. He began featuring for Parrillas One in Liga Nacional from the 2014–15 campaign. He scored on his debut for the club, netting a late goal in a 3–2 defeat away to Real España on 1 August 2014. He followed that with fifteen further goals that season, including a brace over Victoria in September. Midway through the next campaign, in January 2016, López completed a move to top-flight side Real España. He scored twenty-one times in one hundred appearances across three seasons, with Real España winning the 2017–18 Apertura in the process.

== International career ==
In June 2018, López was called up by the Honduras national team. He subsequently won two caps for his country, coming off the substitutes bench in friendly matches with South Korea and El Salvador. López made the preliminary squad for the 2019 CONCACAF Gold Cup, though was cut from the final squad.

== Career statistics ==
=== Club ===
As of 6 June 2019.

Club statistics
Club	Season	League			Cup		Continental		Other		Total	
Club	Season	Division	Apps	Goals	Apps	Goals	Apps	Goals	Apps	Goals	Apps	Goals
Parrillas One	2014–15	Liga Nacional	35	16	0	0	—		0	0	35	16
Real España	2015–16	Liga Nacional	15	5	0	0	—		3 (Note: Appearance(s) in the Liga Nacional play-offs)	0	18	5
Real España	2016–17	Liga Nacional	33	6	0	0	—		8	2	41	8
Real España	2017–18	Liga Nacional	31	6	0	0	—		10	2	41	8
Real España	2018–19	Liga Nacional	39	8	0	0	2 (Note: Appearance(s) in the CONCACAF League)	0	4	0	45	8
Real España	Total		118	25	0	0	2	0	25	4	145	29
Career total			153	41	0	0	2	0	25	4	180	45

=== International ===
As of 19 January 2022

National team	Year	Apps	Goals
Honduras	2018	2	0
Honduras	2022	1	0
Total		3	0

== Honours ==
Real España

- Liga Nacional: 2017–18 Apertura
