= 2020–21 Honduran Liga Nacional =

Liga Nacional
- Season: 2020–21
- Dates: 26 September 2020–May 2021
- Champions: Apertura: Olimpia; Clausura: Olimpia
- Relegated: Real de Minas
- CONCACAF League: Olimpia; Motagua; Marathón
- Matches: 166
- Goals: 492 (2.96 per match)
- Top goalscorer: Bengtson (23)
- Biggest home win: OLI 7–0 HNP (12 May 2021)
- Biggest away win: RSO 1–6 VID (1 November 2020)
- Highest scoring: RSO 1–6 VID (1 November 2020)
- Longest unbeaten run: OLI (14)
- Longest losing run: RSO (5); MAR (5)
- All statistics correct as of 19 May 2021.

The 2020–21 Honduran Liga Nacional season was the 55th Honduran Liga Nacional edition since its establishment in 1965. The tournament started in September 2020 and is scheduled to end in mid 2021. The season was divided into two halves (Apertura and Clausura), each crowning one champion. Due to the impact of the COVID-19 pandemic on association football, a new and more compact format is to be used. The first stage was shortened from 18 to 14 weeks. The tournament was divided into two groups of five. The top teams of each group advanced directly to the semifinal round, and the teams finishing 2nd and 3rd from each group had to play a playoff round. At the end of the season, the three teams with the best record qualified to the 2021 CONCACAF League.

== 2020–21 teams ==
Location of teams in 2020–21 season

A total of 10 teams will contested the tournament, the same that participated in the 2019–20 season since no relegation was implemented.

Team	Location	Stadium	Capacity
Honduras Progreso	El Progreso	Estadio Humberto Micheletti	5,000
Marathón	San Pedro Sula	Estadio Yankel Rosenthal	15,000
Motagua	Tegucigalpa	Estadio Tiburcio Carías Andino	35,000
Olimpia	Tegucigalpa	Estadio Tiburcio Carías Andino	35,000
Platense	Puerto Cortés	Estadio Excélsior	7,910
Real de Minas	Danlí	Estadio Marcelo Tinoco	5,000
Real España	San Pedro Sula	Estadio Francisco Morazán	26,781
Real Sociedad	Tocoa	Estadio Francisco Martínez Durón	3,000
UPNFM	Choluteca	Estadio Emilio Williams Agasse	8,000
Vida	La Ceiba	Estadio Nilmo Edwards	18,000

== Apertura ==
The Apertura tournament was the first half of the 2020–21 season which ran from September 2020 to January 2021. C.D. Olimpia lifted their second straight title and their 32nd overall.

=== Regular season ===
==== Standings ====
Group A

Pos	Team	Pld	W	D	L	GF	GA	GD	Pts	Qualification or relegation
1	Olimpia	14	10	4	0	30	9	+21	34	Advance to Semifinals
2	Motagua	14	10	2	2	33	10	+23	32	Advance to Play-offs
3	UPNFM	14	4	6	4	20	20	0	18	Advance to Play-offs
4	Real de Minas	14	2	6	6	18	24	−6	12	
5	Real Sociedad	14	1	2	11	12	38	−26	5	

Updated to match(es) played on 12 December 2020. Source: Soccerway
Rules for classification: 1) points; 2) goal difference; 3) number of goals scored.

Group B

Pos	Team	Pld	W	D	L	GF	GA	GD	Pts	Qualification or relegation
1	Marathón	14	8	2	4	24	11	+13	26	Advance to Semifinals
2	Vida	14	6	3	5	25	18	+7	21	Advance to Play-offs
3	Platense	14	4	5	5	18	25	−7	17	Advance to Play-offs
4	Real España	14	4	4	6	18	18	0	16	
5	Honduras Progreso	14	2	4	8	12	37	−25	10	

Updated to match(es) played on 12 December 2020. Source: Soccerway
Rules for classification: 1) points; 2) goal difference; 3) number of goals scored.

==== Results ====
Home \ Away	HNP	MAR	MOT	OLI	PLA	RDM	RES	RSO	UPN	VID
Honduras Progreso	—	1–1	0–5	—	1–1	—	0–3	1–2	2–3	1–1
Marathón	4–0	—	1–2	1–3	3–0	—	3–0	5–0	—	0–2
Motagua	—	1–1	—	0–0	5–0	2–1	—	2–1	0–1	3–0
Olimpia	5–0	—	2–1	—	—	0–0	1–0	5–0	3–1	1–0
Platense	0–0	0–1	—	2–3	—	3–2	1–0	—	1–1	1–0
Real de Minas	3–4	2–0	0–3	2–3	1–1	—	—	2–1	1–1	—
Real España	5–0	0–1	0–1	1–1	3–2	1–1	—	—	—	0–3
Real Sociedad	—	—	1–5	0–2	2–3	0–0	1–2	—	2–3	1–6
UPNFM	0–1	0–2	2–3	1–1	—	2–2	1–1	1–1	—	—
Vida	4–1	0–1	—	—	3–3	3–1	2–2	1–0	0–3	—

Updated to match(es) played on 12 December 2020. Source: Soccerway
Legend: Blue = home team win; Yellow = draw; Red = away team win.
For upcoming matches, an "a" indicates there is an article about the rivalry between the two participants.

=== Playoffs ===
==== Results ====
First round
17 and 20 December 2020
Platense	2	1	3
Motagua	4	0	4
19 and 23 December 2020
UPNFM	1	1	2
Vida	3	5	8

Quarter-finals
30 December 2020 and 3 January 2021
Motagua	2	2	4
Marathón	0	1	1
30 December 2020 and 3 January 2021
Vida	0	0	0
Olimpia	0	3	3

Semi-finals
23 and 27 December 2020
Olimpia	1	1	2
Marathón	3	0	3
6 and 10 January 2021
Motagua	1	0	1
Olimpia	3	0	3

Final
January 2021
Marathón	0	0	0
Olimpia	2	1	3

17 December 2020 Playoffs	Platense	2–4	Motagua	Puerto Cortés
16:00	Bernárdez 28'; Barahona 84' Starting XI (GK) Pineda – 24; Castillo – 3 Martínez – 5 (substituted off) 81' Araúz – 8 (substituted off) 58' Lugli – 9 (substituted off) 65' Fajardo – 13; Barahona – 14; Bernárdez – 16; (substituted off) 58' Jaramillo – 20; (substituted off) 65' Morales – 25; Oseguera – 28; Substitutes; (substituted on) 58' Martínez – 38; (substituted on) 58' Rodríguez – 17; (substituted on) 65' Moncada – 10; (substituted on) 65' Domínguez – 43; (substituted on) 81' Zúniga – 30; Coach; López (Colombia)	Report	8' 63' López; 23' (o.g.) Martínez; 51' Castillo Starting XI; 19 – Rougier (GK); 5 – Pereira; 7 – Izaguirre (substituted off) 71'; 8 – Martínez (substituted off) 71'; 11 – Vega (substituted off) 74'; 12 – Santos; 16 – Castellanos; 17 – Decas (substituted off) 46'; 24 – Elvir; 29 – Castillo; 34 – López (substituted off) 74'; Substitutes; 35 – Meléndez (substituted on) 46'; 6 – Mayorquín (substituted on) 71'; 10 – Galvaliz (substituted on) 71'; 9 – Klusener (substituted on) 74'; 18 – Crisanto (substituted on) 74'; Coach (Argentina) Vásquez	Stadium: Estadio Excélsior; Attendance: Closed gates Referee: Luís Mejía

20 December 2020 Playoffs	Motagua	0–1 (4–3 agg.)	Platense	Tegucigalpa
16:00	Starting XI (GK) Rougier – 19; Pereira – 5 (substituted off) 46' Klusener – 9 (substituted off) 46' Galvaliz – 10; Santos – 12; Castellanos – 16; Elvir – 24; (substituted off) 79' Castillo – 29; (substituted off) 46' Núñez – 32; (substituted off) 72' López – 34; Meléndez – 35; Substitutes; (substituted on) 46' Peña – 4 (substituted on) 46' Martínez – 8 (substituted on) 46' Vega – 11; (substituted on) 72' Crisanto – 18; (substituted on) 79' Moreira – 21; Coach; Vásquez (Argentina)	Report	45+1' (pen.) Bernárdez Starting XI; 24 – Pineda (GK); 3 – Castillo; 5 – Martínez; 8 – Araúz (substituted off) 89'; 10 – Moncada (substituted off) 69'; 13 – Fajardo; 14 – Barahona; 16 – Bernárdez (substituted off) 63'; 25 – Morales (substituted off) 88'; 28 – Oseguera; 43 – Domínguez; Substitutes; 9 – Lugli (substituted on) 63' (substituted off) 88'; 17 – Rodríguez (substituted on) 69'; 30 – Zúniga (substituted on) 88'; 18 – Padilla (substituted on) 88'; 39 – Pérez (substituted on) 89'; Coach (Colombia) López	Stadium: Estadio Tiburcio Carías Andino; Attendance: Closed gates Referee: Nelson Salgado

19 December 2020 Playoffs	UPNFM	1–3	Vida	Tegucigalpa
17:00	Moncada (penalty missed); Peña 61' Starting XI (GK) Castro – 30; Reyes – 6 (substituted off) 46' C. Róchez – 7 Moncada – 8 (substituted off) 29' Bodden – 9 Montoya – 16; (substituted off) 46' J. Róchez – 24; (substituted off) 57' Garay – 27; Gómez – 28; Mejía – 29; Cacho – 36; Substitutes; (substituted on) 29' (substituted off) 78' Lacayo – 14; (substituted on) 46' Flores – 10; (substituted on) 46' Peña – 21; (substituted on) 57' Argeñal – 18; (substituted on) 78' Elvir – 26; Coach; Nazar (Honduras)	Report	3' 39' 81' (pen.) Palma Starting XI; 30 – Mendoza (GK); 3 – C. Meléndez; 4 – Velásquez; 5 – Mazzola (substituted off) 89'; 6 – Palma; 8 – D. Meléndez; 14 – Argueta (substituted off) 81'; 16 – Escalante (substituted off) 69'; 22 – Aguilar; 27 – Quaye; 31 – Sánchez (substituted off) 89'; Substitutes; 21 – L. Meléndez (substituted on) 69'; 36 – Arzú (substituted on) 81'; 15 – Rosales (substituted on) 89'; 33 – Sander (substituted on) 89' Coach (Honduras) Membreño	Stadium: Estadio Tiburcio Carías Andino; Attendance: Closed gates Referee: Selvin Brown

23 December 2020 Playoffs	Vida	5–1 (8–2 agg.)	UPNFM	La Ceiba
17:15	Palma 20' 65'; Aguilar 35' 54'; Quaye 44'	Report	40' Moncada	Stadium: Estadio Nilmo Edwards; Attendance: Closed gates Referee: Armando Castro

23 December 2020 Playoffs	Marathón	3–1	Olimpia	San Pedro Sula
15:00	Volpi 60'; Solano 65'; Johnson 90' Starting XI (GK) Torres – 25; (substituted off) 84' Suazo – 6 Garrido – 8 Ramírez – 13; Banegas – 16; (substituted off) 68' Volpi – 20; Johnson – 29; (substituted off) 85' Solano – 30; Arriaga – 33; (substituted off) 74' Vega – 65; Motiño – 67; Substitutes; (substituted on) 68' Palermo – 22; (substituted on) 74' Lahera – 7 (substituted on) 84' López – 12; (substituted on) 85' Moreira – 3 Coach; Vargas (Argentina)	Report	85' Hernández Starting XI; 22 – Fonseca (GK); 2 – Núñez; 3 – Oliva; 15 – Rodríguez (substituted off) 87'; 17 – Paz; 19 – Arboleda (substituted off) 64'; 20 – Flores; 25 – Portillo; 27 – Bengtson (substituted off) 78'; 31 – Bernárdez (substituted off) 64'; 32 – Pineda (substituted off) 78'; Substitutes; 30 – Hernández (substituted on) 64'; 21 – Pinto (substituted on) 64'; 8 – Reyes (substituted on) 78'; 23 – Álvarez (substituted on) 78'; 10 – Garrido (substituted on) 87'; Coach (Argentina) Troglio	Stadium: Estadio Yankel Rosenthal; Attendance: Closed gates Referee: Héctor Rodríguez

27 December 2020 Playoffs	Olimpia	1–0 (2–3 agg.)	Marathón	Tegucigalpa
18:00	Reyes 90+4'	Report		Stadium: Estadio Tiburcio Carías Andino; Attendance: Closed gates Referee: Óscar Moncada

30 December 2020 Semifinals	Vida	0–0	Olimpia	La Ceiba
17:15		Report		Stadium: Estadio Nilmo Edwards; Attendance: Closed gates Referee: Saíd Martínez

3 January 2021 Semifinals	Olimpia	3–0 (3–0 agg.)	Vida	Tegucigalpa
16:00	Arboleda 28'; Álvarez 42'; Hernández 67'	Report		Stadium: Estadio Tiburcio Carías Andino; Attendance: Closed gates Referee: Armando Castro

30 December 2020 Semifinals	Motagua	2–0	Marathón	Tegucigalpa
19:00	Castillo 41' (pen.) 74'	Report		Stadium: Estadio Tiburcio Carías Andino; Attendance: Closed gates Referee: Melvin Matamoros

3 January 2021 Semifinals	Marathón	1–2 (1–4 agg.)	Motagua	San Pedro Sula
15:00	Volpi 23' (pen.)	Report	8' Vega; 38' López	Stadium: Estadio Yankel Rosenthal; Attendance: Closed gates Referee: Héctor Rodríguez

6 January 2021 Final	Motagua	1–3	Olimpia	Tegucigalpa
19:00	Castillo 48' (pen.)	Report	2' Bengtson; 19' Hernández; 44' (o.g.) Santos	Stadium: Estadio Tiburcio Carías Andino; Attendance: Closed gates Referee: Óscar Moncada

10 January 2021 Final	Olimpia	0–0 (3–1 agg.)	Motagua	Tegucigalpa
16:00		Report		Stadium: Estadio Tiburcio Carías Andino; Attendance: Closed gates Referee: Melvin Matamoros

Note: Despite their elimination in the semifinals, C.D. Marathón clinched their spot at the extra final series as winners of the regular season first place decider playoff.

14 January 2021 Final	Olimpia	2–0	Marathón	Tegucigalpa
19:00	Hernández 46'; Bengtson 72'	Report		Stadium: Estadio Tiburcio Carías Andino; Attendance: Closed gates Referee: Saíd Martínez

17 January 2021 Final	Marathón	0–1 (0–3 agg.)	Olimpia	San Pedro Sula
11:00		Report	72' Arboleda	Stadium: Estadio Yankel Rosenthal; Attendance: Closed gates Referee: Héctor Rodríguez

== Clausura ==
The Clausura tournament was the second half of the 2020–21 season which was played in the first semester of 2021. C.D. Olimpia won their third consecutive national championship and their 33rd overall after winning both the regular season and the playoff stage.

=== Regular season ===
==== Standings ====
Group A

Pos	Team	Pld	W	D	L	GF	GA	GD	Pts	Qualification or relegation
1	Olimpia	14	11	2	1	36	9	+27	35	Advance to Semifinals
2	Motagua	14	9	4	1	29	14	+15	31	Advance to Play-offs
3	UPNFM	14	5	4	5	20	19	+1	19	Advance to Play-offs
4	Real Sociedad	14	3	8	3	21	21	0	17	
5	Real de Minas	14	0	6	8	11	31	−20	6	

Updated to match(es) played on 27 April 2021. Source: Soccerway
Rules for classification: 1) points; 2) goal difference; 3) number of goals scored.

Group B

Pos	Team	Pld	W	D	L	GF	GA	GD	Pts	Qualification or relegation
1	Real España	14	4	7	3	17	13	+4	19	Advance to Semifinals
2	Honduras Progreso	14	3	6	5	20	25	−5	15	Advance to Play-offs
3	Vida	14	2	8	4	19	23	−4	14	Advance to Play-offs
4	Marathón	14	3	5	6	17	22	−5	14	
5	Platense	14	2	6	6	20	33	−13	12	

Updated to match(es) played on 27 April 2021. Source: Soccerway
Rules for classification: 1) points; 2) goal difference; 3) number of goals scored.

==== Results ====
Home \ Away	HNP	MAR	MOT	OLI	PLA	RDM	RES	RSO	UPN	VID
Honduras Progreso	—	1–1	—	0–5	2–2	5–2	1–1	—	0–3	0–0
Marathón	1–1	—	0–1	—	1–0	3–2	1–2	—	1–1	1–2
Motagua	5–2	2–0	—	1–2	—	2–2	1–0	2–0	3–1	—
Olimpia	—	2–1	0–0	—	5–0	2–0	1–0	3–1	5–1	—
Platense	0–4	5–3	2–3	—	—	1–1	2–2	0–3	—	2–2
Real de Minas	—	—	0–3	0–3	1–4	—	0–0	0–0	0–3	2–2
Real España	1–0	2–2	—	1–2	4–0	—	—	0–0	1–1	0–0
Real Sociedad	3–1	1–1	3–3	2–2	—	1–1	—	—	1–1	2–4
UPNFM	0–2	—	1–2	2–1	0–0	2–0	—	1–2	—	3–1
Vida	1–1	0–1	1–1	0–3	2–2	—	2–3	2–2	—	—

Updated to match(es) played on 27 April 2021. Source: Soccerway
Legend: Blue = home team win; Yellow = draw; Red = away team win.
For upcoming matches, an "a" indicates there is an article about the rivalry between the two participants.

=== Playoffs ===
==== Results ====
1 May 2021 Playoffs	UPNFM	3–2	Honduras Progreso	Tegucigalpa
17:00	Osorio 15'; Elvir 31'; Guillén 78'	Report	4' Agámez; 79' Rotondi	Stadium: Estadio Tiburcio Carías Andino; Attendance: Closed gates Referee: Alex Morazán

5 May 2021 Playoffs	Honduras Progreso	4–0 (6–3 agg.)	UPNFM	El Progreso
19:00	Rotondi 5' 78' 90+12'; Agámez 89'	Report		Stadium: Estadio Humberto Micheletti; Attendance: Closed gates Referee: Marlon Díaz

2 May 2021 Playoffs	Vida	1–1	Motagua	La Ceiba
15:06	Palma 57'	Report	87' Moncada	Stadium: Estadio Nilmo Edwards; Attendance: Closed gates Referee: Orlando Hernández

4 May 2021 Playoffs	Motagua	3–0 (4–1 agg.)	Vida	Tegucigalpa
19:00	López 69'; Mayorquín 78'; Klusener 83'	Report		Stadium: Estadio Tiburcio Carías Andino; Attendance: Closed gates Referee: Jefferson Escobar

1 May 2021 Playoffs	Real España	0–0	Olimpia	San Pedro Sula
18:00		Report		Stadium: Estadio Olímpico Metropolitano; Attendance: Closed gates Referee: Héctor Rodríguez

5 May 2021 Playoffs	Olimpia	2–1 (2–1 agg.)	Real España	Tegucigalpa
19:00	Chirinos 27'; Bengtson 64' (pen.)	Report	30' Mejía	Stadium: Estadio Tiburcio Carías Andino; Attendance: Closed gates Referee: Nelson Salgado

8 May 2021 Semifinals	Honduras Progreso	0–0	Olimpia	El Progreso
18:00		Report		Stadium: Estadio Humberto Micheletti; Attendance: Closed gates Referee: Melvin Matamoros

12 May 2021 Semifinals	Olimpia	7–0 (7–0 agg.)	Honduras Progreso	Tegucigalpa
20:00		Report		Stadium: Estadio Tiburcio Carías Andino; Attendance: Closed gates

8 May 2021 Semifinals	Motagua	1–0	Real España	Tegucigalpa
20:00	Galvaliz 30'	Report		Stadium: Estadio Tiburcio Carías Andino; Attendance: Closed gates Referee: Óscar Moncada

12 May 2021 Semifinals	Real España	1–0 (1–1 agg.) (6–7 p)	Motagua	San Pedro Sula
18:00		Report		Stadium: Estadio Olímpico Metropolitano; Attendance: Closed gates

16 May 2021 Final	Motagua	2–1	Olimpia	Tegucigalpa
18:00	Moreira 35' (pen.); Villafranca 90+2' (pen.)	Report	56' Bengtson	Stadium: Estadio Tiburcio Carías Andino; Attendance: Closed gates Referee: Armando Castro

19 May 2021 Final	Olimpia	1–0 (2–2 agg.) (4–3 p)	Motagua	Tegucigalpa
19:00	Bengtson 44'	Report		Stadium: Estadio Tiburcio Carías Andino; Attendance: Closed gates Referee: Saíd Martínez
	Penalties
	Alvarado (penalty scored); Leverón (penalty missed); Hernández (penalty scored); Flores (penalty scored); Bengtson (penalty scored)		(penalty missed) Moreira; (penalty scored) García; (penalty scored) Decas; (penalty scored) Villafranca; (penalty missed) Martínez

== Top goalscorers ==
The top goalscorer will be determined by the addition of goals of both Apertura and Clausura tournaments.

As of 19 May 2021

- 23 goals:

(Honduras) Jerry Bengtson (Olimpia)

- 15 goals:

(Colombia) Justin Arboleda (Olimpia)

- 14 goals:

(Paraguay) Roberto Moreira (Motagua)

- 13 goals:

(Honduras) Carlos Bernárdez (Platense)
(Honduras) Luis Palma (Vida)

- 12 goals:

(Argentina) Gonzalo Klusener (Motagua)

- 11 goals:

(Honduras) Eddie Hernández (Olimpia)

- 10 goals:

(Honduras) Rubilio Castillo (Motagua)
(Honduras) Rony Martínez (R. España / R. Sociedad)
(Colombia) Yerson Gutiérrez (H. Progreso / Platense)
(Argentina) Eduardo Rotondi (Honduras Progreso)
(Honduras) Michaell Chirinos (Olimpia)

- 9 goals:

(Colombia) Rafael Agámez (Honduras Progreso)

- 8 goals:

(Honduras) Diego Rodríguez (Real de Minas)
(Honduras) Marco Vega (Motagua)
(Honduras) Alexander Aguilar (Vida)
(Honduras) Ángel Tejeda (Real España / Vida)
(Argentina) Ramiro Rocca (Real España)
(Honduras) Juan Mejía (UPNFM)
(Honduras) Kevin López (Motagua)

- 7 goals:

(Argentina) Bruno Volpi (Marathón)
(Honduras) Carlos Meléndez (Vida)
(Honduras) Edwin Solano (Marathón)
(Honduras) Carlos Róchez (UPNFM)

- 6 goals:

(Honduras) Mario Martínez (Real España)

- 5 goals:

(Honduras) Osman Melgares (Real Sociedad)
(Honduras) Kervin Arriaga (Marathón)
(Honduras) Iván López (Real España / Motagua)

- 4 goals:

(Honduras) Víctor Moncada (UPNFM)
(Argentina) Ryduan Palermo (Marathón)
(Honduras) Carlo Costly (Marathón)
(Honduras) Walter Martínez (Motagua)
(Honduras) Christian Altamirano (Real Sociedad)
(Honduras) Diego Reyes (Olimpia)
(Argentina) Kevin Hoyos (Marathón)
(Honduras) César Guillén (Vida / UPNFM)

- 3 goals:

(Honduras) Óliver Morazán (Real Sociedad)
(Honduras) Óscar García (Real de Minas)
(Honduras) Dábirson Castillo (Platense)
(Honduras) Aldo Fajardo (Platense)
(Honduras) Byron Rodríguez (Platense)
(Honduras) Jairo Róchez (UPNFM)
(Honduras) Erick Andino (H. Progreso / Real de Minas)
(Honduras) Bryan Johnson (Marathón / H. Progreso)
Marcelo Canales (Honduras Progreso)
(Honduras) Joshua Nieto (Real de Minas)
(Honduras) Ronal Montoya (UPNFM)
(Honduras) Michael Osorio (UPNFM)
(Honduras) Jesse Moncada (Real de Minas / Motagua)
(Honduras) José Pinto (Olimpia)

- 2 goals:

(Honduras) Jeancarlo Vargas (Platense)
(Honduras) Allan Banegas (Marathón)
(Honduras) Víctor Araúz (Platense)
(Honduras) César Oseguera (Platense)
(Colombia) Sebastián Colón (Real de Minas)
(Honduras) Denis Meléndez (Vida)
(Honduras) Elvin Oliva (Olimpia)
(Honduras) Luís Vega (Marathón)
(Honduras) Darixon Vuelto (Real España)
(Cuba) Yaudel Lahera (Marathón)
(Honduras) Jason Sánchez (UPNFM)
(Honduras) Wisdom Quaye (Vida)
(Honduras) José Velásquez (Vida)
(Honduras) Marlon Ramírez (Marathón)
Cristian Sacaza (Honduras Progreso)
(Honduras) Ilce Barahona (Platense)
(Honduras) Omar Elvir (Motagua)
(Honduras) Juan Delgado (H. Progreso / Motagua)
(Honduras) Carlos Sánchez (Vida)
(Honduras) Roney Bernárdez (Real de Minas)
(Honduras) José Tobías (Real Sociedad)
(Honduras) William Moncada (Real de Minas)
(Honduras) Allans Vargas (Real España)
(Honduras) Carlos Fernández (Motagua)
(Honduras) José Vigil (Marathón)
(Honduras) Cristopher Meléndez (Motagua)
(Honduras) Sergio Peña (Motagua)
(Mexico) Omar Rosas (Real España)
(Honduras) José García (Olimpia)
(Honduras) Edder Delgado (Real de Minas)
(Argentina) Ezequiel Aguirre (Olimpia)
(Honduras) Henry Romero (Platense)
(Honduras) Samuel Elvir (UPNFM)
(Argentina) Matías Galvaliz (Motagua)
(Honduras) Edwin Rodríguez (Olimpia)

- 1 goal:

(Honduras) Júnior García (Real España)
(Honduras) José Reyes (Olimpia)
(Honduras) Bayron Méndez (Motagua)
(Honduras) Lesvin Medina (UPNFM)
(Honduras) Kenneth Ulloa (UPNFM)
(Argentina) Isaías Olariaga (Real Sociedad)
(Honduras) Jorge Castrillo (Real España)
(Honduras) Cristian Cálix (Marathón)
(Honduras) Júnior Lacayo (UPNFM)
(Honduras) Darwin Andino (Real de Minas)
(Honduras) Éver Alvarado (Olimpia)
(Grenada) Jamal Charles (Real Sociedad)
(Honduras) Alex Martínez (Real Sociedad)
(Honduras) Micher Antúnez (Vida)
(Honduras) Elder Torres (Vida)
(Honduras) Deyron Martínez (Real Sociedad)
(Honduras) Carlos Argueta (Vida)
(Uruguay) Matías Soto (Real España)
(Honduras) Marvin Bernárdez (Olimpia)
(Honduras) Maylor Núñez (Olimpia)
(Honduras) Yeer Gutiérrez (Real Sociedad)
(Honduras) Richard Zúniga (Platense)
(Honduras) Aldo Oviedo (Real de Minas)
(Honduras) Samuel Córdova (Olimpia)
(Argentina) Matías Garrido (Olimpia)
(Honduras) Ted Bodden (UPNFM)
(Uruguay) Mathías Techera (Marathón)
(Honduras) Hesller Morales (Platense)
(Colombia) Yeison Mosquera (Honduras Progreso)
Samuel Lucas (Honduras Progreso)
(Honduras) Manuel Elvir (UPNFM)
(Honduras) Héctor Castellanos (Motagua)
(Honduras) Kílmar Peña (UPNFM)
(Honduras) Jorge Álvarez (Olimpia)
(Honduras) Axel Barrios (Real de Minas)
(Honduras) Luís Meléndez (Vida)
(Honduras) Jonathan Paz (Olimpia)
(Honduras) Johnny Leverón (Olimpia)
(Honduras) Bryan Bernárdez (Vida)
(Honduras) Óscar García (Motagua)
Óscar González (Honduras Progreso)
(Honduras) Jonathan Núñez (Motagua)
(Honduras) Kendrick Cárcamo (Real Sociedad)
Yunni Dolmo (Honduras Progreso)
(Honduras) Jerrick Díaz (UPNFM)
(Honduras) Maikel García (Real España)
(Honduras) Franklin Flores (Real España)
(Honduras) José Domínguez (Platense)
(Honduras) Luis Argeñal (UPNFM)
(Honduras) Sendel Cruz (UPNFM)
(Uruguay) Guillermo Chavasco (Vida)
(Honduras) Joel Membreño (Vida)
(Argentina) Jonatan Corzo (Real Sociedad)
(Colombia) Breyner Bonilla (Real Sociedad)
(Honduras) Brayan Beckeles (Olimpia)
(Honduras) Henry Güity (Real de Minas)
(Honduras) Arnold Meléndez (UPNFM)
(Honduras) Iverson Jiménez (Vida)
(Honduras) Reinieri Mayorquín (Motagua)
(Honduras) Yeison Mejía (Real España)
(Honduras) Josué Villafranca (Motagua)

- 1 own-goal:

Cristian Sacaza (Honduras Progreso)
(Honduras) José Velásquez (Vida)
(Uruguay) Mathías Techera (Marathón)
(Honduras) Raúl Santos (Motagua)
(Colombia) Rafael Agámez (Honduras Progreso)
(Colombia) Aldair Simanca (Platense)
(Honduras) Getsel Montes (Real España)
(Honduras) Edgar Vásquez (UPNFM)
(Honduras) Yeer Gutiérrez (Real Sociedad)
(Honduras) Denis Meléndez (Vida)
(Honduras) Cristopher Meléndez (Motagua)
(Honduras) Juan Montes (Motagua)

- 2 own-goals:

(Honduras) Marcos Martínez (Platense)
Óscar González (Honduras Progreso)

== Aggregate table ==
Relegation was determined by the aggregated table of both Apertura and Clausura tournaments. On 27 April 2021, C.D. Real de Minas was officially relegated after finishing last in the aggregated standings.

Pos	Team	Pld	W	D	L	GF	GA	GD	Pts	Qualification or relegation
1	Olimpia	28	21	6	1	66	18	+48	69	Qualified to 2021 CONCACAF League
2	Motagua	28	19	6	3	62	24	+38	63	Qualified to 2021 CONCACAF League
3	Marathón	28	11	7	10	41	33	+8	40	Qualified to 2021 CONCACAF League
4	UPNFM	28	9	10	9	40	39	+1	37	
5	Real España	28	8	11	9	35	31	+4	35	
6	Vida	28	8	11	9	44	41	+3	35	
7	Platense	28	6	11	11	38	58	−20	29	
8	Honduras Progreso	28	5	10	13	32	62	−30	25	
9	Real Sociedad	28	4	10	14	33	59	−26	22	
10	Real de Minas	28	2	12	14	29	55	−26	18	Relegated to 2021–22 Honduran Liga Nacional de Ascenso

Updated to match(es) played on 27 April 2021. Source: RSSSF
Rules for classification: 1) points; 2) goal difference; 3) number of goals scored.
