= 2018–19 F.C. Motagua season =

Motagua
2018–19 season
- Chairman: Eduardo Atala
- Manager: Diego Vásquez
- Stadium: Nacional
- Apertura: Winners
- Clausura: Winners
- Honduran Cup: Round of 64
- CONCACAF League: Runners-up
- Top goalscorer: League: Moreira (23); All: Moreira (23)
Home colours	Away colours	Third colours
- All statistics correct as of 2 June 2019.

The 2018–19 season is F.C. Motagua's 72nd season in existence and the club's 53rd consecutive season in the top fight of Honduran football. As runners-up of both Apertura and Clausura last season, the club is looking for their 16th and 17th league title. They also competed for the 2018 Honduran Cup and the 2018 CONCACAF League.

== Overview ==
Coach Diego Vásquez will be leading the team for his 10th consecutive tournament. Last season, Vásquez reached 200 consecutive games as Motagua's manager, a club's and league record. The club started the season on 22 July with a shocking 1–2 defeat against Las Delicias F.C. in the 2018 Honduran Cup, making this the second time in a row they fall through the first round against a Liga Mayor club at such tournament. On 1 November 2018, the club lost 2–3 on aggregate against C.S. Herediano in the final series of the 2018 CONCACAF League. This marked the first time in history that the club qualified to a final in a tournament organized by CONCACAF. With the defeat, Motagua failed to qualify to the 2019 CONCACAF Champions League. Thanks to their outstanding participation in the first half of the season, coach Vásquez, as well as players Jonathan Rougier, Juan Montes and Rubilio Castillo were nominated at the 2018 CONCACAF Awards. On 16 December 2018, the club conquered their 16th national title with a 2–1 aggregate score over their city rivals Club Deportivo Olimpia in the Apertura final series, a win which gave them the right to qualify to the 2019 CONCACAF League. For their second year in a row, the club was voted as the best Honduran team according to Uruguayan newspaper El País. In the Clausura tournament, Motagua repeated and once again lifted the trophy with a 3–2 win on aggregate over their city opponents Olimpia in the final series.

== Kits ==
The 2018–19 home, away and third kits were published on 24 June. On 5 December, the club released a special retro edition commemorating the 90th anniversary.

Manufacturer		Main sponsor	
Joma		Pepsi	
Home	Away	Alternative	Goalkeeper

== Players ==
=== Transfers in ===
Player	Contract date	Moving from
(Honduras) Carlos Sánchez	13 June 2018	Honduras Progreso
(Argentina) Matías Galvaliz	27 June 2018	(Argentina) Defensores de Belgrano
(Paraguay) Roberto Moreira	28 June 2018	(Argentina) Ferro Carril Oeste
(Honduras) Marlon Licona	4 July 2018	Honduras Progreso
(Honduras) Sergio Peña	25 July 2018	(Honduras) Real Sociedad
(Argentina) Marcelo Estigarribia	11 January 2019	(Argentina) Villa Dálmine

=== Transfers out ===
Player	Released date	Moving to
(Argentina) Germán Mayenfisch	6 June 2018	(Argentina) Juventud Unida U.
(Honduras) Carlos Discua	27 June 2018	(Honduras) Marathón
(Honduras) Deybi Flores	4 July 2018	(Honduras) Olimpia
(Honduras) Foslyn Grant	4 July 2018	(Honduras) Vida
(Honduras) Denilson Castillo	11 July 2018	(Honduras) Real España
(Honduras) Félix Crisanto	18 July 2018	(Mexico) Lobos BUAP
(Honduras) Henry Figueroa	21 December 2018	(Costa Rica) Alajuelense
(Honduras) Harold Fonseca	3 January 2019	(Honduras) Vida
(Colombia) Javier Estupiñán	4 January 2019	(Honduras) Juticalpa
(Honduras) Rubilio Castillo	25 January 2019	(Costa Rica) Saprissa
(Honduras) Jack Baptiste	7 March 2019	(United States) Loudoun United
(Honduras) César Romero	8 March 2019	(United States) Colorado S. Switchbacks

=== Squad ===
- Statistics as of 2 June 2019
- Only league matches into account

No.	Pos.	Player name	Date of birth and age	Games played			Goals scored		
				< 17/18	18/19	Total	< 17/18	18/19	Total
1	GK	(Honduras) Harold Fonseca	8 October 1993 (aged 24)	23	0	23	0	0	0
1	GK	(Honduras) Edgardo Meléndez	11 September 1993 (aged 24)	0	0	0	0	0	0
2	DF	(Honduras) Juan Montes	26 October 1985 (aged 32)	174	42	216	10	2	12
3	DF	(Honduras) Henry Figueroa	28 December 1992 (aged 25)	159	7	166	3	0	3
4	MF	(Honduras) Sergio Peña	9 May 1987 (aged 31)	0	23	23	0	1	1
5	DF	(Honduras) Marcelo Pereira	27 May 1995 (aged 23)	72	22	94	4	4	8
6	MF	(Honduras) Reinieri Mayorquín	13 July 1989 (aged 28)	146	36	182	10	0	10
7	MF	(Honduras) Erick Andino	21 July 1989 (aged 28)	96	29	125	26	8	34
8	MF	(Honduras) Walter Martínez	26 March 1991 (aged 27)	37	35	72	8	1	9
9	FW	(Honduras) Rubilio Castillo	26 November 1991 (aged 26)	138	16	154	76	8	84
10	MF	(Argentina) Matías Galvaliz	6 June 1989 (aged 29)	0	35	35	0	2	2
11	FW	(Honduras) Marco Vega	14 April 1987 (aged 31)	70	23	93	15	1	16
12	MF	(Honduras) Raúl Santos	2 August 1992 (aged 25)	27	30	57	0	0	0
14	DF	(Honduras) Klifox Bernárdez	14 May 1997 (aged 21)	39	5	44	0	0	0
15	MF	(Honduras) César Romero	19 January 1999 (aged 19)	3	0	3	0	0	0
16	MF	(Honduras) Héctor Castellanos	28 December 1992 (aged 25)	108	33	141	1	0	1
17	MF	(Honduras) Denil Maldonado	25 May 1998 (aged 20)	7	42	49	0	1	1
18	DF	(Honduras) Wilmer Crisanto	24 June 1989 (aged 29)	171	28	199	16	2	18
19	GK	(Argentina) Jonathan Rougier	29 October 1987 (aged 30)	55	37	92	0	0	0
21	FW	(Paraguay) Roberto Moreira	6 May 1987 (aged 31)	0	44	44	0	21	21
22	FW	(Colombia) Javier Estupiñán	8 February 1984 (aged 34)	19	15	34	4	3	7
22	FW	(Argentina) Marcelo Estigarribia	10 April 1995 (aged 23)	0	18	18	0	7	7
23	MF	(Honduras) Jack Baptiste	20 December 1999 (aged 18)	7	3	10	0	0	0
24	DF	(Honduras) Omar Elvir	28 September 1989 (aged 28)	220	35	255	10	0	10
25	GK	(Honduras) Marlon Licona	9 February 1991 (aged 27)	70	9	79	0	0	0
26	DF	(Honduras) Harrinson Bernárdez	14 May 1997 (aged 21)	4	2	6	0	0	0
27	MF	(Honduras) Stanley Turcios	2 February 2004 (aged 14)	0	0	0	0	0	0
28	FW	(Honduras) Josué Villafranca	16 December 1999 (aged 18)	1	5	6	0	1	1
30	MF	(Honduras) Marvin Ávila	9 March 2002 (aged 16)	0	0	0	0	0	0
31	MF	(Honduras) Carlos Sánchez	22 August 1990 (aged 27)	0	12	12	0	0	0
32	MF	(Honduras) Jonathan Núñez	26 November 2001 (aged 16)	0	2	2	0	0	0
34	FW	(Honduras) Kevin López	3 February 1996 (aged 22)	85	41	126	12	10	22
35	DF	(Honduras) Cristopher Meléndez	25 November 1997 (aged 20)	15	9	24	0	0	0
39	MF	(Honduras) Ángel Barrios	27 October 2000 (aged 17)	0	1	1	0	0	0
49	MF	(Honduras) Juan Gómez	3 April 2000 (aged 18)	0	0	0	0	0	0
54	MF	(Honduras) Éverson López	3 November 2000 (aged 17)	0	4	4	0	0	0
Manager		(Argentina) Diego Vásquez	3 July 1971 (aged 46)	23 November 2013–					
RESERVES TEAM
No.	Pos.	Player name	Date of birth and age	Games played			Goals scored		
				< 17/18	18/19	T	< 17/18	18/19	T
36		(Honduras) Ángel Raudales	19 July 2001 (aged 16)	0	0	0	0	0	0
37		(Honduras) Áxel Bardales	6 August 2000 (aged 17)	0	0	0	0	0	0
38	MF	(Honduras) Álex Gómez	11 January 2003 (aged 15)	0	0	0	0	0	0
41		(Honduras) Bryan Cruz	11 April 2001 (aged 17)	0	0	0	0	0	0
42		(Honduras) Brian Sierra	4 April 2002 (aged 16)	0	0	0	0	0	0
43		(Honduras) Wilfredo Torres	6 January 2000 (aged 18)	0	0	0	0	0	0
44	DF	(Honduras) Albert Galindo	21 October 2000 (aged 17)	0	0	0	0	0	0
45		(Honduras) Kevin Álvarez	6 October 2000 (aged 17)	0	0	0	0	0	0
48	DF	(Honduras) Edgar Sabillón	18 November 2000 (aged 17)	0	0	0	0	0	0
50		(Honduras) Maynor Colón	8 December 2000 (aged 17)	0	0	0	0	0	0
51	MF	(Honduras) Maicol Zelaya	8 December 2001 (aged 16)	0	0	0	0	0	0
52		(Honduras) Néster Martínez	11 January 2000 (aged 18)	0	0	0	0	0	0
53		(Honduras) Arnol Álvarez	19 January 2001 (aged 17)	0	0	0	0	0	0
55	FW	(Honduras) Erick Gonzales	23 May 2001 (aged 17)	0	0	0	0	0	0
57	MF	(Honduras) Roney Bernárdez	19 June 2002 (aged 16)	0	0	0	0	0	0
59		(Honduras) Carlos Banegas	9 February 2001 (aged 17)	0	0	0	0	0	0
60	GK	(Honduras) Álex Rivera	20 July 2000 (aged 17)	0	0	0	0	0	0
61	MF	(Honduras) Allan Villalta	22 October 1999 (aged 18)	0	0	0	0	0	0
62	MF	(Honduras) Walter Gómez	29 September 2000 (aged 17)	0	0	0	0	0	0

=== Goalkeeper's action ===
- As of 2 June 2019

Goalkeeper	Years evaluated	Games	Goals	Per.
(Argentina) Jonathan Rougier	2017–2019	92	83	0.902
(Honduras) Marlon Licona	2010–2017, 2018–2019	79	92	1.165
(Honduras) Harold Fonseca	2011–2015, 2016–2018	23	28	1.217

=== International caps ===
- As of 21 June 2019

This is a list of players that were playing for Motagua during the 2018–19 season and were called to represent Honduras at different international competitions.

Player	Team	Event	Caps	Goals
Henry Figueroa	Adult	Friendlies v United Arab Emirates, Panama and Chile	3	0
Héctor Castellanos	Adult	Friendlies v Ecuador, Paraguay and Brazil	1	0
Héctor Castellanos	Adult	2019 CONCACAF Gold Cup	1	0
Félix Crisanto	Adult	Friendlies v Paraguay and Brazil	2	0
Félix Crisanto	Adult	2019 CONCACAF Gold Cup	0	0
Denil Maldonado	Adult	Friendlies v Ecuador, Paraguay and Brazil	0	0
Denil Maldonado	Adult	2019 CONCACAF Gold Cup	0	0
Denil Maldonado	Under-21	2018 Central American and Caribbean Games	5	1
Omar Elvir	Adult	Friendly v Ecuador	0	0
Kevin López	Adult	Friendly v Ecuador	0	0
Éverson López	Under-21	2018 Central American and Caribbean Games	3	0
Éverson López	Under-20	2018 CONCACAF U-20 Championship	4	2
Éverson López	Under-20	2019 FIFA U-20 World Cup	2	0
Jack Baptiste	Under-21	2018 Central American and Caribbean Games	4	0
Jack Baptiste	Under-20	2018 CONCACAF U-20 Championship	5	0
Jack Baptiste	Under-20	2019 FIFA U-20 World Cup	3	0
Jack Baptiste	Under-19	2018 UNCAF U-19 Tournament	4	0
Josué Villafranca	Under-21	2018 Central American and Caribbean Games	4	1
Josué Villafranca	Under-20	2018 CONCACAF U-20 Championship	7	7
Josué Villafranca	Under-20	2019 FIFA U-20 World Cup	3	0
Josué Villafranca	Under-19	2018 UNCAF U-19 Tournament	6	1
Jonathan Núñez	Under-20	2018 CONCACAF U-20 Championship	3	0
Jonathan Núñez	Under-20	2019 FIFA U-20 World Cup	2	0
Jonathan Núñez	Under-19	2018 UNCAF U-19 Tournament	0	0
César Romero	Under-20	2018 CONCACAF U-20 Championship	5	2
César Romero	Under-20	2019 FIFA U-20 World Cup	2	0
Roney Bernárdez	Under-17	2019 CONCACAF U-17 Championship	4	0
Marvin Ávila	Under-17	2019 CONCACAF U-17 Championship	4	0
Brian Sierra	Under-17	2019 CONCACAF U-17 Championship	4	0

== Results ==
All times are local CST unless stated otherwise

=== Preseason and friendlies ===
15 July 2018 Friendly	Motagua (Honduras)	2–2 (2–4 p)	(Costa Rica) Alajuelense	Tegucigalpa, Honduras
16:00	Vega 10'; Moreira 55'; Sánchez (penalty missed)		15' A. López; 80' Moya	Stadium: Estadio Tiburcio Carías Andino; Referee: Saíd Martínez (HON) Starting XI: 19 – Rougier (substituted off) 46'; 2 – Montes; 3 – Figueroa; 5 – Pereira; 6 – Mayorquín; 8 – Martínez; 11 – Vega (substituted off) 63'; 16 – Castellanos; 18 – Crisanto; 21 – Moreira (substituted off) 67'; 24 – Elvir (substituted off) 70'; Substitutes; 34 – López (substituted on) 46'; 25 – Licona (substituted on) 46'; 10 – Galvaliz (substituted on) 46'; 7 – Andino (substituted on) 63'; 22 – Estupiñán (substituted on) 67'; 31 – Sánchez (substituted on) 70'
	Penalties
	Galvaliz (penalty scored); Andino (penalty missed); López (penalty missed); Estupiñán (penalty scored)		(penalty scored) McDonald; (penalty missed) Moya; (penalty scored) Álvarez; (penalty scored) Guevara; (penalty scored) P. López
Note: F.C. Motagua and Liga Deportiva Alajuelense faced in preseason in Costa Rica one year prior. Both teams played for the 2018 Copa Diunsa the same day of the 2018 FIFA World Cup Final.

17 November 2018 Friendly	Santos	1–1	Motagua	Siguatepeque
16:30	Urquía		(pen.) Estupiñán	Stadium: Estadio Roberto Martínez Ávila
Note: This was the first ever meeting between these two clubs.

6 January 2019 Friendly	Motagua	1–0	Real España	Cantarranas
16:30	Andino 58'	Report		Stadium: Estadio Municipal; Referee: Melvin Matamoros Starting XI: 19 – Rougier (substituted off) 46'; 2 – Montes; 6 – Mayorquín; 10 – Galvaliz; 11 – Vega; 12 – Santos; 16 – Castellanos; 17 – Maldonado; 21 – Moreira; 31 – Sánchez; 34 – López; Substitutes; 25 – Licona (substituted on) 46'; 7 – Andino (substituted on) 46'; 23 – Baptiste (substituted on); 8 – Martínez (substituted on); 28 – Villafranca (substituted on)
Note: This was the first F.C. Motagua's visit to this venue since 4 November 2015 for the 2015–16 Honduran Cup against Independiente.

15 March 2019 Friendly	Miami United (United States)	2–1	(Honduras) Motagua	Hialeah, United States
21:00 EST	Montaño 43'; Shamar 90+1'		78' López	Stadium: Ted Hendricks Stadium; Referee: Starting XI: 25 – Licona; 2 – Montes; 4 – Peña; 5 – Pereira; 6 – Mayorquín; 7 – Andino; 11 – Vega; 12 – Santos; 18 – Crisanto; 31 – Sánchez; 34 – López; Substitutes; 16 – Castellanos (substituted on); 24 – Elvir (substituted on)
Note: This was the first ever encounter between these two clubs and the first F.C. Motagua's visit to the city of Miami since January 2010. The 'Copa Comunidad de Honduras' was the name of the trophy which served as an incentive.

17 March 2019 Friendly	Motagua	2–0	Platense	New Orleans, United States
20:15	Andino 77'; Galvaliz 81'			Stadium: Behrman Stadium; Referee: Starting XI: 25 – Licona; 2 – Montes; 5 – Pereira; 6 – Mayorquín; 10 – Galvaliz; 12 – Santos; 16 – Castellanos; 21 – Moreira; 22 – Estigarribia; 24 – Elvir; 34 – López
Note: Both teams were invited to participate in the '2019 Copa de Campeones' as the last winners of the Honduran League and Cup.

=== Apertura ===
28 July 2018 Week 1	Motagua	1–0	Platense	Tegucigalpa
20:00	Moreira 22'	Report		Stadium: Estadio Tiburcio Carías Andino; Attendance: 1,712; Referee: Marlon Díaz Starting XI: 19 – Rougier; 2 – Montes; 5 – Pereira; 8 – Martínez (substituted off) 66'; 10 – Galvaliz; 11 – Vega; 16 – Castellanos; 21 – Moreira (substituted off) 81'; 24 – Elvir; 34 – López (substituted off) 70'; 35 – Meléndez; Substitutes; 6 – Mayorquín (substituted on) 66'; 12 – Santos (substituted on) 70'; 31 – Sánchez (substituted on) 81'
Note: This game was rescheduled from 29 July due to F.C. Motagua's compromises at the 2018 CONCACAF League. Roberto Moreira, Matías Galvaliz and Carlos Sánchez made their official debuts for the club; and Moreira scoring the winning goal.

4 August 2018 Week 2	Honduras Progreso	2–0	Motagua	El Progreso
19:15	Gutiérrez 12'; Delgado 83'	Report		Stadium: Estadio Humberto Micheletti; Attendance: 808; Referee: Jonfy Vallecillo Starting XI: 19 – Rougier; 2 – Montes; 5 – Pereira; 6 – Mayorquín; 8 – Martínez; 11 – Vega (substituted off) 63'; 21 – Moreira; 23 – Baptiste; 31 – Sánchez; 34 – López (substituted off) 46'; 35 – Meléndez (substituted off) 46'; Substitutes; 18 – Crisanto (substituted on) 46'; 12 – Santos (substituted on) 46'; 9 – Castillo (substituted on) 63'
Note: Midfielder Carlos Sánchez, now playing for F.C. Motagua, faced his previous club. This was Motagua's first defeat against C.D. Honduras Progreso since 30 August 2015 (4–1).

12 August 2018 Week 3	Motagua	1–0	Real España	Tegucigalpa
16:00	Castillo 6' (pen.)	Report		Stadium: Estadio Tiburcio Carías Andino; Attendance: 4,856; Referee: Nelson Salgado Starting XI: 19 – Rougier; 2 – Montes; 3 – Figueroa; 6 – Mayorquín; 9 – Castillo (substituted off) 80'; 10 – Galvaliz (substituted off) 74'; 12 – Santos; 14 – Bernárdez; 17 – Maldonado; 21 – Moreira (substituted off) 90+2'; 34 – López; Substitutes; 8 – Martínez (substituted on) 74'; 22 – Estupiñán (substituted on) 80'; 23 – Baptiste (substituted on) 90+2'
Note: Forward Rubilio Castillo reached his 100th goal in the league becoming the fourth all-time goal scorer. He also scored his 77th goal for F.C. Motagua and is along with Ángel Obando, the club's all-time goal scorer.

15 August 2018 Week 4	Vida	1–2	Motagua	La Ceiba
19:30	Mejía 62'	Report	26' (pen.) Moreira; 72' Castillo	Stadium: Estadio Nilmo Edwards; Attendance: 5,039; Referee: Armando Castro Starting XI: 19 – Rougier; 2 – Montes; 3 – Figueroa; 6 – Mayorquín; 9 – Castillo (substituted off) 82'; 10 – Galvaliz; 12 – Santos; 14 – Bernárdez (substituted off) 82'; 17 – Maldonado; 21 – Moreira (substituted off) 75'; 34 – López; Substitutes; 11 – Vega (substituted on) 75'; 22 – Estupiñán (substituted on) 82'; 31 – Sánchez (substituted on) 82'
Note: With a late header, Rubilio Castillo scored his 101st Liga Nacional goal and is now the league's third all-time goalscorer, just behind Wilmer Velásquez and Denilson Costa; furthermore, with 78 goals for F.C. Motagua, he became the club's single top scorer. The match was temporary suspended at '85 due to a power outage.

19 August 2018 Week 5	Motagua	0–1	Olimpia	Tegucigalpa
16:00		Report	86' Castillo	Stadium: Estadio Tiburcio Carías Andino; Attendance: 9,912; Referee: Melvin Matamoros Starting XI: 19 – Rougier; 2 – Montes; 3 – Figueroa; 6 – Mayorquín; 9 – Castillo (substituted off) 75'; 10 – Galvaliz (substituted off) 79'; 12 – Santos; 14 – Bernárdez; 17 – Maldonado; 21 – Moreira (substituted off) 85'; 34 – López; Substitutes; 11 – Vega (substituted on) 75'; 8 – Martínez (substituted on) 79'; 22 – Estupiñán (substituted on) 85'
Note: Despite the loss, F.C. Motagua stayed in second position.

26 August 2018 Week 6	Motagua	1–0	UPNFM	Tegucigalpa
16:00	Andino 65'	Report		Stadium: Estadio Tiburcio Carías Andino; Attendance: 6,689; Referee: Óscar Moncada Starting XI: 25 – Licona; 4 – Peña; 5 – Pereira; 7 – Andino; 8 – Martínez; 11 – Vega; 16 – Castellanos (substituted off) 59'; 22 – Estupiñán (substituted off) 73'; 26 – Bernárdez; 31 – Sánchez; 35 – Meléndez (substituted off) 28'; Substitutes; 17 – Maldonado (substituted on) 28'; 10 – Galvaliz (substituted on) 59'; 9 – Castillo (substituted on) 73'
Note: Considering their midweek obligations at the 2018 CONCACAF League, coach Diego Vásquez sent an alternative XI. Forward Erick Andino scored a goal exactly one year later (26 August 2017 against C.D. Honduras Progreso).

10 October 2018 Week 7	Marathón	1–1	Motagua	San Pedro Sula
15:00	Arboleda 19'	Report	37' López	Stadium: Estadio Yankel Rosenthal; Attendance: 2,285; Referee: Nelson Salgado Starting XI: 19 – Rougier; 2 – Montes; 6 – Mayorquín; 7 – Andino (substituted off) 59'; 9 – Castillo (substituted off) 76'; 12 – Santos; 16 – Castellanos; 17 – Maldonado; 21 – Moreira (substituted off) 68'; 24 – Elvir; 34 – López; Substitutes; 8 – Martínez (substituted on) 59'; 10 – Galvaliz (substituted on) 68'; 22 – Estupiñán (substituted on) 76'
Note: This game was postponed due to F.C. Motagua's participation in Jamaica for the 2018 CONCACAF League. Kevin López scored his 13th goal with the club.

9 September 2018 Week 8	Motagua	5–0	Juticalpa	Tegucigalpa
16:00	Castillo 2' 90' (pen.); Moreira 6' 48'; Murillo 77' (o.g.)	Report		Stadium: Estadio Tiburcio Carías Andino; Attendance: 3,069; Referee: Marlon Díaz Starting XI: 19 – Rougier; 2 – Montes; 3 – Figueroa; 6 – Mayorquín; 9 – Castillo; 10 – Galvaliz (substituted off) 56'; 12 – Santos; 14 – Bernárdez (substituted off) 70'; 17 – Maldonado; 21 – Moreira; 34 – López (substituted off) 76'; Substitutes; 8 – Martínez (substituted on) 56'; 24 – Elvir (substituted on) 70'; 7 – Andino (substituted on) 76'
Note: Forward Roberto Moreira scored his first double with the team. Rubilio Castillo scored a penalty kick in a Panenka style.

12 September 2018 Week 9	Real de Minas	0–0	Motagua	Danlí
15:15		Report		Stadium: Estadio Marcelo Tinoco; Attendance: 3,462; Referee: Héctor Rodríguez Starting XI: 19 – Rougier; 2 – Montes; 3 – Figueroa; 8 – Martínez; 9 – Castillo (substituted off) 18'; 12 – Santos (substituted off) 68'; 16 – Castellanos (substituted off) 63'; 17 – Maldonado; 21 – Moreira; 24 – Elvir; 34 – López; Substitutes; 11 – Vega (substituted on) 18'; 4 – Peña (substituted on) 63'; 7 – Andino (substituted on) 68'
Note: This was F.C. Motagua's first visit to this venue since March 2011 (0–1 win over C.D. Necaxa). Forward Rubilio Castillo was injured early in the game. It was the club's first draw of the season.

16 September 2018 Week 10	Platense	1–0	Motagua	Puerto Cortés
16:00	Rodas (penalty missed); Nieto 82' (pen.)	Report	(penalty missed) Montes	Stadium: Estadio Excélsior; Attendance: 2,330; Referee: Raúl Castro Starting XI: 19 – Rougier; 2 – Montes; 5 – Pereira; 6 – Mayorquín; 7 – Andino (substituted off) 68'; 8 – Martínez (substituted off) 85'; 11 – Vega (substituted off) 64'; 12 – Santos; 14 – Bernárdez; 16 – Castellanos; 22 – Estupiñán; Substitutes; 21 – Moreira (substituted on) 64'; 18 – Crisanto (substituted on) 68'; 34 – López (substituted on) 85'
Note: With the loss, F.C. Motagua missed the opportunity to reach the first position. Erick Andino completed his 100th appearance with the club.

23 September 2018 Week 11	Motagua	2–0	Honduras Progreso	Tegucigalpa
16:00	Crisanto (penalty missed); Andino 76'; Vega 89'	Report		Stadium: Estadio Tiburcio Carías Andino; Attendance: 2,424; Referee: Ángel Cruz Starting XI: 25 – Licona; 4 – Peña; 5 – Pereira; 8 – Martínez; 11 – Vega; 12 – Santos; 17 – Maldonado; 18 – Crisanto (substituted off) 62'; 22 – Estupiñán (substituted off) 58'; 24 – Elvir; 26 – Bernárdez (substituted off) 46'; Substitutes; 7 – Andino (substituted on) 46'; 21 – Moreira (substituted on) 58'; 34 – López (substituted on) 62'
Note: With the win, the club moved up to second position. Marco Vega scored his first goal of the season.

30 September 2018 Week 12	Real España	1–1	Motagua	San Pedro Sula
18:10	Vuelto 14'	Report	48' Castillo	Stadium: Estadio General Francisco Morazán; Attendance: 4,627; Referee: Nelson Salgado Starting XI: 19 – Rougier; 2 – Montes; 3 – Figueroa; 6 – Mayorquín; 7 – Andino (substituted off) 77'; 16 – Castellanos; 17 – Maldonado; 18 – Crisanto (substituted off) 75'; 21 – Moreira; 22 – Estupiñán (substituted off) 46'; 24 – Elvir; Substitutes; 9 – Castillo (substituted on) 46'; 8 – Martínez (substituted on) 75'; 12 – Santos (substituted on) 77'
Note: The match was pushed one day later to allow F.C. Motagua 72 hours of rest after their compromise at the 2018 CONCACAF League's semifinals. Rubilio Castillo scored his 12th goal against Real C.D. España and became the all-time top goalscorer against this club. With the tie, the club improved to second position.

17 October 2018 Week 13	Motagua	1–0	Vida	Tegucigalpa
19:00	Estupiñán 27'	Report		Stadium: Estadio Tiburcio Carías Andino; Attendance: 986; Referee: Erick Andino Starting XI: 25 – Licona; 3 – Figueroa; 4 – Peña; 5 – Pereira; 7 – Andino (substituted off) 58'; 8 – Martínez (substituted off) 77'; 10 – Galvaliz (substituted off) 46'; 17 – Maldonado; 22 – Estupiñán; 31 – Sánchez; 34 – López; Substitutes; 6 – Mayorquín (substituted on) 46'; 21 – Moreira (substituted on) 58'; 18 – Crisanto (substituted on) 77'
Note: This match was postponed 10 days due to bad weather and ironically the game was finally played in even worst conditions. Javier Estupiñán scored the sole goal to help F.C. Motagua reach the top of the standings.

14 October 2018 Week 14	Olimpia	1–1	Motagua	Tegucigalpa
16:00	Martínez 84'	Report	64' Castillo	Stadium: Estadio Tiburcio Carías Andino; Attendance: 9,040; Referee: Saíd Martínez Starting XI: 19 – Rougier; 2 – Montes; 5 – Pereira; 7 – Andino (substituted off) 81'; 9 – Castillo; 12 – Santos; 16 – Castellanos; 17 – Maldonado; 18 – Crisanto (substituted off) 46'; 21 – Moreira (substituted off) 88'; 24 – Elvir; Substitutes; 10 – Galvaliz (substituted on) 46'; 8 – Martínez (substituted on) 81'; 22 – Estupiñán (substituted on) 88'
Note: Forward Rubilio Castillo scored his 82nd goal with the club. The score 1–1 became the most common result between these two teams with 46 times.

20 October 2018 Week 15	UPNFM	1–3	Motagua	Choluteca
18:30	Peña 24'	Report	13' Castillo; 65' Montes; 90+3' Estupiñán	Stadium: Estadio Emilio Williams Agasse; Attendance: 5,110; Referee: Melvin Matamoros Starting XI: 19 – Rougier; 2 – Montes; 8 – Martínez (substituted off) 46'; 9 – Castillo; 10 – Galvaliz (substituted off) 88'; 12 – Santos; 16 – Castellanos; 17 – Maldonado; 21 – Moreira (substituted off) 63'; 24 – Elvir; 34 – López; Substitutes; 6 – Mayorquín (substituted on) 46'; 22 – Estupiñán (substituted on) 63'; 18 – Crisanto (substituted on) 88'
Note: This win represented F.C. Motagua's second away victory of the season, reaching the top of the standings.

29 October 2018 Week 16	Motagua	1–0	Marathón	Tegucigalpa
15:00	Estupiñán 57'	Report		Stadium: Estadio Tiburcio Carías Andino; Attendance: 1,953; Referee: Óscar Moncada Starting XI: 25 – Licona; 2 – Montes; 4 – Peña; 5 – Pereira; 7 – Andino (substituted off) 66'; 8 – Martínez (substituted off) 71'; 12 – Santos; 17 – Maldonado; 18 – Crisanto (substituted off) 67'; 22 – Estupiñán; 31 – Sánchez; Substitutes; 35 – Meléndez (substituted on) 66'; 6 – Mayorquín (substituted on) 67'; 21 – Moreira (substituted on) 71'
Note: As F.C. Motagua had a 2018 CONCACAF League match on Thursday, this game was pushed one day later to allow the team 72 hours of rest. Coach Diego Vásquez sent an alternative squad considering their forthcoming match against C.S. Herediano.

4 November 2018 Week 17	Juticalpa	1–2	Motagua	Juticalpa
17:00	Lanza 90+4' (pen.)	Report	8' Peña; 83' (pen.) Moreira	Stadium: Estadio Juan Ramón Brevé Vargas; Attendance: 2,376; Referee: Raúl Castro Starting XI: 19 – Rougier; 2 – Montes; 4 – Peña (substituted off) 77'; 6 – Mayorquín; 8 – Martínez; 9 – Castillo; 12 – Santos; 17 – Maldonado; 22 – Estupiñán (substituted off) 57'; 24 – Elvir (substituted off) 61'; 34 – López; Substitutes; 21 – Moreira (substituted on) 57'; 31 – Sánchez (substituted on) 61'; 35 – Meléndez (substituted on) 77'
Note: After their recent elimination at the 2018 CONCACAF League, the club obtained a win which secured them a direct pass to the semifinals. Defender Sergio Peña scored his first goal for the team.

10 November 2018 Week 18	Motagua	6–1	Real de Minas	Tegucigalpa
19:00	Galvaliz 6'; Moreira 14' 32'; Martínez 50'; López 72' 83'	Report	(penalty missed) 52' Silva	Stadium: Estadio Tiburcio Carías Andino; Attendance: 2,014; Referee: Armando Castro Starting XI: 25 – Licona; 2 – Montes; 8 – Martínez (substituted off) 70'; 10 – Galvaliz (substituted off) 81'; 12 – Santos; 16 – Castellanos; 17 – Maldonado; 21 – Moreira; 22 – Estupiñán (substituted off) 59'; 24 – Elvir; 34 – López; Substitutes; 7 – Andino (substituted on) 59'; 18 – Crisanto (substituted on) 70'; 6 – Mayorquín (substituted on) 81'
Note: With the win, F.C. Motagua finished the regular season at the top of the standings for the first time since 2010.

25 November 2018 Semifinals	Platense	0–1	Motagua	Puerto Cortés
16:00		Report	49' López	Stadium: Estadio Excélsior; Attendance: 4,398; Referee: Melvin Matamoros Starting XI: 19 – Rougier; 2 – Montes; 6 – Mayorquín (substituted off) 85'; 8 – Martínez; 9 – Castillo (substituted off) 86'; 12 – Santos; 16 – Castellanos; 17 – Maldonado; 21 – Moreira; 24 – Elvir; 34 – López (substituted off) 83'; Substitutes; 7 – Andino (substituted on) 83'; 4 – Peña (substituted on) 85'; 22 – Estupiñán (substituted on) 86'
Note: This is the third time F.C. Motagua and Platense F.C. meet in a semifinal series. In the previous two (1998 and 2010), Motagua advanced. Forward Kevin López scored the winning goal and reached his 100th appearance with the club. Also, the club obtained its sixth consecutive victory for the first time since April 2015.

2 December 2018 Semifinals	Motagua	3–1	Platense	Tegucigalpa
16:00	López 30'; Maldonado 48'; Crisanto 84'	Report	76' Castro	Stadium: Estadio Tiburcio Carías Andino; Attendance: 13,784; Referee: Saíd Martínez Starting XI: 19 – Rougier; 2 – Montes; 6 – Mayorquín; 9 – Castillo (substituted off) 75'; 10 – Galvaliz (substituted off) 66'; 12 – Santos; 16 – Castellanos (substituted off) 46'; 17 – Maldonado; 21 – Moreira; 24 – Elvir; 34 – López; Substitutes; 4 – Peña (substituted on) 46'; 8 – Martínez (substituted on) 66'; 18 – Crisanto (substituted on) 75'
Note: With the win, F.C. Motagua qualified to their fifth straight final. Defender Denil Maldonado scored his first goal for the club.

9 December 2018 Final	Olimpia	0–2	Motagua	Tegucigalpa
16:00		Report	64' Castillo; 71' Moreira	Stadium: Estadio Tiburcio Carías Andino; Attendance: 23,350; Referee: Héctor Rodríguez Starting XI: 19 – Rougier; 2 – Montes; 6 – Mayorquín (substituted off) 62'; 9 – Castillo; 10 – Galvaliz (substituted off) 77'; 12 – Santos; 16 – Castellanos (substituted off) 83'; 17 – Maldonado; 21 – Moreira; 24 – Elvir; 34 – López; Substitutes; 8 – Martínez (substituted on) 62'; 4 – Peña (substituted on) 77'; 5 – Pereira (substituted on) 83'
Note: This is the eighth final series between these two clubs. In the previous seven, F.C. Motagua won 5 and Club Deportivo Olimpia 2.

16 December 2018 Final	Motagua	0–1	Olimpia	Tegucigalpa
16:00		Report	78' (o.g.) Montes	Stadium: Estadio Tiburcio Carías Andino; Attendance: 22,701; Referee: Melvin Matamoros Starting XI: 19 – Rougier; 2 – Montes; 6 – Mayorquín (substituted off) 74'; 9 – Castillo; 10 – Galvaliz (substituted off) 64'; 12 – Santos; 16 – Castellanos; 17 – Maldonado; 21 – Moreira; 24 – Elvir; 34 – López (substituted off) 87'; Substitutes; 8 – Martínez (substituted on) 64'; 4 – Peña (substituted on) 74'; 7 – Andino (substituted on) 87'
Note: With a 2–1 aggregate score, F.C. Motagua obtained their 16th national title. With the win, the club qualified to international competitions for the 2019–20 season.

=== Clausura ===
13 January 2019 Week 1	Motagua	4–0	Honduras Progreso	Tegucigalpa
16:00	Andino 5'; Moreira 45+1'; López 63'; Villafranca 78'	Report		Stadium: Estadio Tiburcio Carías Andino; Referee: Melissa Borjas Starting XI: 19 – Rougier; 2 – Montes; 6 – Mayorquín (substituted off) 66'; 7 – Andino (substituted off) 55'; 10 – Galvaliz (substituted off) 76'; 12 – Santos; 16 – Castellanos; 17 – Maldonado; 21 – Moreira; 31 – Sánchez; 34 – López; Substitutes; 28 – Villafranca (substituted on) 55'; 8 – Martínez (substituted on) 66'; 18 – Crisanto (substituted on) 76'
Note: Forward Josué Villafranca scored his first goal for F.C. Motagua. The youngster made his reappearance since October 2016.

20 January 2019 Week 2	Real de Minas	0–2	Motagua	Danlí
15:00		Report	15' Andino; 22' López	Stadium: Estadio Marcelo Tinoco; Referee: Raúl Castro Starting XI: 19 – Rougier; 2 – Montes; 6 – Mayorquín; 7 – Andino (substituted off) 63'; 10 – Galvaliz (substituted off) 69'; 12 – Santos; 16 – Castellanos; 17 – Maldonado; 21 – Moreira; 31 – Sánchez; 34 – López (substituted off) 81'; Substitutes; 11 – Vega (substituted on) 63'; 8 – Martínez (substituted on) 69'; 18 – Crisanto (substituted on) 81'
Note: Forward Erick Andino scored the first F.C. Motagua's goal at Danlí since March 2011.

27 January 2019 Week 3	Motagua	1–0	Real España	Tegucigalpa
16:00	Moreira 80'	Report		Stadium: Estadio Tiburcio Carías Andino; Referee: Nelson Salgado Starting XI: 19 – Rougier; 2 – Montes; 6 – Mayorquín; 7 – Andino (substituted off) 66'; 10 – Galvaliz (substituted off) 61'; 12 – Santos; 16 – Castellanos; 17 – Maldonado; 21 – Moreira (substituted off) 85'; 31 – Sánchez; 34 – López; Substitutes; 24 – Elvir (substituted on) 61'; 8 – Martínez (substituted on) 66'; 11 – Vega (substituted on) 85'
Note: With the win, the club improved to 3–0–0 and goalkeeper Jonathan Rougier won his third straight clean-sheet.

2 February 2019 Week 4	UPNFM	1–1	Motagua	Choluteca
18:00	Güity 55'	Report	21' Estigarribia	Stadium: Estadio Emilio Williams Agasse; Referee: Orlando Hernández Starting XI: 19 – Rougier; 2 – Montes; 6 – Mayorquín (substituted off) 73'; 8 – Martínez; 12 – Santos; 16 – Castellanos; 17 – Maldonado; 21 – Moreira; 22 – Estigarribia (substituted off) 79'; 24 – Elvir; 34 – López (substituted off) 83'; Substitutes; 10 – Galvaliz (substituted on) 73'; 11 – Vega (substituted on) 79'; 18 – Crisanto (substituted on) 83'
Note: Forward Marcelo Estigarribia made his official debut with the club scoring a goal. With the draw, F.C. Motagua couldn't simulate their best ever season start of four straight wins in 1973–74.

10 February 2019 Week 5	Motagua	1–1	Olimpia	Tegucigalpa
16:00	Moreira 16' (pen.)	Report	90+3' Güity	Stadium: Estadio Tiburcio Carías Andino; Referee: Melvin Matamoros Starting XI: 19 – Rougier; 2 – Montes; 6 – Mayorquín (substituted off) 46'; 8 – Martínez (substituted off) 82'; 12 – Santos; 16 – Castellanos; 17 – Maldonado; 21 – Moreira; 22 – Estigarribia (substituted off) 68'; 24 – Elvir; 34 – López; Substitutes; 4 – Peña (substituted on) 46'; 11 – Vega (substituted on) 68'; 7 – Andino (substituted on) 82'
Note: For the first time in more than two decades, this derby was nationwide blackout due to the rights being sold to private cable provider Tigo Sport.

13 February 2019 Week 6	Motagua	0–1	Platense	Tegucigalpa
19:30		Report	36' Reyes	Stadium: Estadio Tiburcio Carías Andino; Referee: Nelson Salgado Starting XI: 19 – Rougier; 2 – Montes; 8 – Martínez; 12 – Santos; 16 – Castellanos; 17 – Maldonado; 21 – Moreira; 22 – Estigarribia (substituted off) 56'; 23 – Baptiste (substituted off) 46'; 24 – Elvir; 34 – López (substituted off) 81'; Substitutes; 7 – Andino (substituted on) 46'; 11 – Vega (substituted on) 56'; 18 – Crisanto (substituted on) 81'
Note: This game was played right after the match between Lobos UPNFM and C.D. Real de Minas which served as preliminary to a doubleheader. F.C. Motagua finished the game with nine players after Walter Martínez and Héctor Castellanos were ejected in the second half.

16 February 2019 Week 7	Marathón	1–0	Motagua	San Pedro Sula
15:00	Discua 47'	Report		Stadium: Estadio Yankel Rosenthal; Referee: Óscar Moncada Starting XI: 19 – Rougier; 2 – Montes; 5 – Pereira; 6 – Mayorquín (substituted off) 61'; 7 – Andino (substituted off) 53'; 12 – Santos (substituted off) 55'; 17 – Maldonado; 21 – Moreira; 22 – Estigarribia; 24 – Elvir; 34 – López; Substitutes; 10 – Galvaliz (substituted on) 53'; 4 – Peña (substituted on) 55'; 18 – Crisanto (substituted on) 61'
Note: This defeat marked the club's fourth straight win-less game. Defender Juan Montes reached 200 matches with F.C. Motagua.

24 February 2019 Week 8	Motagua	4–0	Juticalpa	Tegucigalpa
16:00	Moreira 4' 13' (pen.) 20'; López 39'	Report		Stadium: Estadio Tiburcio Carías Andino; Referee: Raúl Castro Starting XI: 19 – Rougier; 2 – Montes; 6 – Mayorquín; 7 – Andino (substituted off) 46'; 10 – Galvaliz; 12 – Santos; 16 – Castellanos; 17 – Maldonado; 21 – Moreira (substituted off) 66'; 24 – Elvir; 34 – López (substituted off) 65'; Substitutes; 28 – Villafranca (substituted on) 46'; 18 – Crisanto (substituted on) 65'; 22 – Estigarribia (substituted on) 66'
Note: Forward Roberto Moreira scored his first hat-trick for the club.

3 March 2019 Week 9	Vida	0–1	Motagua	La Ceiba
15:30		Report	30' Andino	Stadium: Estadio Nilmo Edwards; Attendance: Closed gates Referee: Armando Castro Starting XI: 19 – Rougier; 2 – Montes; 7 – Andino (substituted off) 73'; 10 – Galvaliz (substituted off) 62'; 12 – Santos; 16 – Castellanos; 17 – Maldonado; 21 – Moreira; 24 – Elvir; 32 – Núñez (substituted off) 55'; 34 – López; Substitutes; 4 – Peña (substituted on) 55'; 8 – Martínez (substituted on) 62'; 22 – Estigarribia (substituted on) 73'
Note: This game was played behind closed doors due to a three match suspension to Estadio Nilmo Edwards. Midfielder Jonathan Núñez made his official debut for the club at the age of 16.

7 March 2019 Week 10	Honduras Progreso	0–1	Motagua	El Progreso
19:15		Report	36' Andino	Stadium: Estadio Humberto Micheletti; Referee: Erick Andino Starting XI: 19 – Rougier; 2 – Montes; 7 – Andino (substituted off) 68'; 8 – Martínez; 10 – Galvaliz; 12 – Santos; 16 – Castellanos; 17 – Maldonado; 21 – Moreira (substituted off) 86'; 24 – Elvir; 34 – López (substituted off) 80'; Substitutes; 6 – Mayorquín (substituted on) 68'; 18 – Crisanto (substituted on) 80'; 28 – Villafranca (substituted on) 86'
Note: For the second week in a row, a goal from Erick Andino represents an away win.

10 March 2019 Week 11	Motagua	0–2	Real de Minas	Tegucigalpa
16:00		Report	42' Maradiaga; 65' Oviedo	Stadium: Estadio Tiburcio Carías Andino; Referee: Héctor Rodríguez Starting XI: 25 – Licona; 2 – Montes; 5 – Pereira; 7 – Andino (substituted off) 46'; 10 – Galvaliz; 16 – Castellanos; 17 – Maldonado; 18 – Crisanto (substituted off) 46'; 21 – Moreira; 31 – Sánchez; 32 – Núñez (substituted off) 46'; Substitutes; 22 – Estigarribia (substituted on) 46'; 8 – Martínez (substituted on) 46'; 34 – López (substituted on) 46'
Note: This was the first ever defeat against C.D. Real de Minas in the league.

13 March 2019 Week 12	Real España	3–1	Motagua	San Pedro Sula
19:00	Benavídez 42'; Tobías 49'; Leverón 90+7'	Report	47' Andino	Stadium: Estadio General Francisco Morazán; Referee: Saíd Martínez Starting XI: 19 – Rougier; 2 – Montes; 6 – Mayorquín (substituted off) 83'; 7 – Andino (substituted off) 68'; 8 – Martínez (substituted off) 46'; 12 – Santos; 16 – Castellanos; 17 – Maldonado; 21 – Moreira; 24 – Elvir; 34 – López; Substitutes; 10 – Galvaliz (substituted on) 46'; 18 – Crisanto (substituted on) 68'; 28 – Villafranca (substituted on) 83'
Note: F.C. Motagua allowed three goals in a game for the first time since February 2018.

31 March 2019 Week 13	Motagua	3–0	UPNFM	Tegucigalpa
16:00	Moreira 59' 76'; Estigarribia 90'	Report		Stadium: Estadio Tiburcio Carías Andino; Referee: Erick Andino Starting XI: 25 – Licona; 2 – Montes; 5 – Pereira; 6 – Mayorquín; 7 – Andino (substituted off) 77'; 10 – Galvaliz (substituted off) 87'; 17 – Maldonado; 21 – Moreira (substituted off) 83'; 24 – Elvir; 34 – K. López; 54 – É. López; Substitutes; 18 – Crisanto (substituted on) 77'; 22 – Estigarribia (substituted on) 83'; 11 – Vega (substituted on) 87'
Note: F.C. Motagua returned to action after a 2 week FIFA Calendar break. Aged 18, midfielder Éverson López made his official debut for the club.

7 April 2019 Week 14	Olimpia	0–0	Motagua	Tegucigalpa
16:00	Bengtson (penalty missed)	Report		Stadium: Estadio Tiburcio Carías Andino; Referee: Melissa Borjas Starting XI: 19 – Rougier; 2 – Montes; 5 – Pereira; 6 – Mayorquín (substituted off) 78'; 7 – Andino (substituted off) 75'; 10 – Galvaliz (substituted off) 76'; 16 – Castellanos; 17 – Maldonado; 21 – Moreira; 24 – Elvir; 34 – López; Substitutes; 18 – Crisanto (substituted on) 75'; 22 – Estigarribia (substituted on) 76'; 4 – Peña (substituted on) 78'
Note: It was the first time the Honduran Superclásico was officiated by a female referee. This match became the 100th draw in the history between these two clubs in Liga Nacional. Goalkeeper Jonathan Rougier saved a penalty kick in the first half.

10 April 2019 Week 15	Platense	2–1	Motagua	Puerto Cortés
18:00	Winchester 56'; Nieto 61' (pen.)	Report	21' Pereira	Stadium: Estadio Excélsior; Referee: Raúl Castro Starting XI: 25 – Licona; 2 – Montes; 5 – Pereira; 7 – Andino (substituted off) 65'; 10 – Galvaliz; 16 – Castellanos; 17 – Maldonado; 21 – Moreira (substituted off) 46'; 24 – Elvir; 34 – K. López; 54 – É. López (substituted off) 46'; Substitutes; 6 – Mayorquín (substituted on) 46'; 11 – Vega (substituted on) 46'; 22 – Estigarribia (substituted on) 65'
Note: Platense F.C.'s manager Carlos Martínez had resigned a few days earlier, so interim Carlos Caballero took his place for this match.

14 April 2019 Week 16	Motagua	5–1	Marathón	Tegucigalpa
16:00	López 8'; Estigarribia 37' 50'; Andino 58'; Crisanto 85' (pen.)	Report	21' Arboleda	Stadium: Estadio Tiburcio Carías Andino; Referee: Erick Andino Starting XI: 25 – Licona; 2 – Montes; 4 – Peña (substituted off) 89'; 5 – Pereira; 7 – Andino (substituted off) 74'; 11 – Vega (substituted off) 67'; 16 – Castellanos; 17 – Maldonado; 22 – Estigarribia; 24 – Elvir; 34 – K. López; Substitutes; 28 – Villafranca (substituted on) 67'; 18 – Crisanto (substituted on) 74'; 54 – É López (substituted on) 89'
Note: This 5–1 win, became the largest F.C. Motagua's victory over C.D. Marathón in the history of the league. Forward Marcelo Estigarribia scored his first double with the club.

21 April 2019 Week 17	Juticalpa	2–3	Motagua	Juticalpa
14:00	Salas 27'; Lanza 45+2' (pen.)	Report	26' Estigarribia; 77' Pereira; 86' Moreira	Stadium: Estadio Juan Ramón Brevé Vargas; Referee: Armando Castro Starting XI: 19 – Rougier; 2 – Montes; 4 – Peña; 5 – Pereira; 6 – Mayorquín (substituted off) 55'; 7 – Andino (substituted off) 52'; 17 – Maldonado; 21 – Moreira; 22 – Estigarribia; 24 – Elvir; 39 – Barrios (substituted off) 60'; Substitutes; 10 – Galvaliz (substituted on) 52'; 11 – Vega (substituted on) 55'; 18 – Crisanto (substituted on) 60'
Note: Aged 18, midfierder Ángel Barrios made his official debut with the club.

27 April 2019 Week 18	Motagua	1–1	Vida	Tegucigalpa
15:00	Estigarribia 15'	Report	59' Hernández	Stadium: Estadio Tiburcio Carías Andino; Attendance: 3,636; Referee: Óscar Moncada Starting XI: 19 – Rougier; 2 – Montes; 5 – Pereira; 10 – Galvaliz (substituted off) 72'; 16 – Castellanos; 17 – Maldonado; 21 – Moreira; 22 – Estigarribia; 24 – Elvir; 34 – K. López (substituted off) 78'; 54 – É López (substituted off) 90'; Substitutes; 18 – Crisanto (substituted on) 72'; 11 – Vega (substituted on) 78'; 4 – Peña (substituted on) 90'
Note: With a total of 31 points, F.C. Motagua finished the regular season in the third position and qualified to the play-off stage.

1 May 2019 Play-offs	Platense	0–0	Motagua	Puerto Cortés
16:00		Report		Stadium: Estadio Excélsior; Referee: Erick Andino Starting XI: 19 – Rougier; 2 – Montes; 4 – Peña; 5 – Pereira; 10 – Galvaliz (substituted off) 85'; 11 – Vega (substituted off) 90+3'; 16 – Castellanos; 17 – Maldonado; 21 – Moreira; 24 – Elvir; 34 – López (substituted off) 65'; Substitutes; 18 – Crisanto (substituted on) 65'; 31 – Sánchez (substituted on) 85'; 6 – Mayorquín (substituted on) 90+3'
Note: It was the 8th time in league's history that these two teams meet in a double header elimination, having F.C. Motagua won 6 of the previous 7. Jonathan Rougier completed his 14th clean-sheet of the season.

5 May 2019 Play-offs	Motagua	3–0	Platense	Tegucigalpa
16:00	Moreira 26' (pen.) 44' 50'	Report		Stadium: Estadio Tiburcio Carías Andino; Referee: Raúl Castro Starting XI: 19 – Rougier; 2 – Montes; 4 – Peña; 5 – Pereira; 10 – Galvaliz (substituted off) 74'; 16 – Castellanos (substituted off) 82'; 17 – Maldonado; 21 – Moreira; 22 – Estigarribia (substituted off) 46'; 24 – Elvir; 34 – López; Substitutes; 11 – Vega (substituted on) 46'; 18 – Crisanto (substituted on) 74'; 8 – Martínez (substituted on) 82'
Note: Forward Roberto Moreira scored his second hat-trick of the tournament. F.C. Motagua qualified to their 10th straight semifinal and to their 28th overall.

12 May 2019 Semifinals	Motagua	2–0	Marathón	Tegucigalpa
16:00	Galvaliz 9'; López 64'	Report		Stadium: Estadio Tiburcio Carías Andino; Referee: Saíd Martínez Starting XI: 19 – Rougier; 2 – Montes; 4 – Peña; 10 – Galvaliz (substituted off) 84'; 16 – Castellanos; 17 – Maldonado; 21 – Moreira; 22 – Estigarribia (substituted off) 82'; 24 – Elvir; 34 – López (substituted off) 80'; 35 – Meléndez; Substitutes; 18 – Crisanto (substituted on) 80'; 8 – Martínez (substituted on) 82'; 6 – Mayorquín (substituted on) 84'
Note: It was the 4th time these two teams face in a semifinal round, having F.C. Motagua won 1 of the previous 3. Matías Galvaliz scored his second goal for the club and his first one since November 2018. Goalkeeper Jonathan Rougier obtained his third straight clean-sheet.

18 May 2019 Semifinals	Marathón	2–2	Motagua	San Pedro Sula
15:00	Arboleda 36' 41'	Report	47' Estigarribia; 73' Montes	Stadium: Estadio Yankel Rosenthal; Attendance: 4,168; Referee: Óscar Moncada Starting XI: 19 – Rougier; 2 – Montes; 4 – Peña; 5 – Pereira; 6 – Mayorquín (substituted off) 46'; 10 – Galvaliz (substituted off) 66'; 17 – Maldonado; 21 – Moreira (substituted off) 53'; 22 – Estigarribia; 24 – Elvir; 34 – López; Substitutes; 8 – Martínez (substituted on) 46'; 11 – Vega (substituted on) 53'; 35 – Meléndez (substituted on) 66'
Note: With a 4–2 aggregate score, F.C. Motagua advanced to their 6th consecutive final, a club's record.

26 May 2019 Final	Motagua	2–2	Olimpia	Tegucigalpa
16:00	Pereira 18' 22'	Report	2' Alvarado; (penalty missed) Bengtson; 90' (o.g.) Pereira	Stadium: Estadio Tiburcio Carías Andino; Referee: Melissa Borjas Starting XI: 19 – Rougier; 2 – Montes; 4 – Peña (substituted off) 86'; 5 – Pereira; 10 – Galvaliz (substituted off) 65'; 16 – Castellanos; 21 – Moreira; 22 – Estigarribia (substituted off) 71'; 24 – Elvir; 34 – López; 35 – Meléndez; Substitutes; 8 – Martínez (substituted on) 65'; 11 – Vega (substituted on) 71'; 6 – Mayorquín (substituted on) 86'
Note: F.C. Motagua will play their 6th consecutive final series and their 9th one against Club Deportivo Olimpia, having won 6 from the previous 8. Defender Marcelo Pereira reached three goals in Honduran Superclásicos.

2 June 2019 Final	Olimpia	0–1	Motagua	Tegucigalpa
16:00		Report	18' Moreira	Stadium: Estadio Tiburcio Carías Andino; Referee: Armando Castro Starting XI: 19 – Rougier; 4 – Peña (substituted off) 46'; 5 – Pereira; 10 – Galvaliz (substituted off) 76'; 16 – Castellanos; 17 – Maldonado; 21 – Moreira (substituted off) 65'; 22 – Estigarribia; 24 – Elvir; 34 – López; 35 – Meléndez; Substitutes; 6 – Mayorquín (substituted on) 46'; 11 – Vega (substituted on) 65'; 18 – Crisanto (substituted on) 76'
Note: With a 3–2 win on aggregate score, F.C. Motagua conquered their 17th national title.

=== Honduran Cup ===
22 July 2018 Round of 64	Las Delicias	2–1	Motagua	San Francisco de la Paz
14:00	Rosales 84' 86'	Report	88' Vega	Stadium: Estadio Óscar Peralta; Referee: Nelson Salgado Starting XI: 19 – Rougier; 2 – Montes; 3 – Figueroa (substituted off) 67'; 5 – Pereira; 6 – Mayorquín (substituted off) 46'; 8 – Martínez; 11 – Vega; 16 – Castellanos; 18 – Crisanto (substituted off) 64'; 21 – Moreira (substituted off) 46'; 24 – Elvir; Substitutes; 22 – Estupiñán (substituted on) 46'; 10 – Galvaliz (substituted on) 46'; 34 – López (substituted on) 64'; 12 – Santos (substituted on) 67'; 31 – Sánchez (substituted on)
Note: Las Delicias F.C. plays in the Honduran Liga Mayor. It was the first ever encounter between these two teams and the first F.C. Motagua's visit at this venue. Motagua failed to advance from the first round in this tournament for the second year in a row.

=== CONCACAF League ===
31 July 2018 Round of 16	Motagua (Honduras)	2–0	(Belize) Belmopan Bandits	Tegucigalpa, Honduras
20:06	López 47'; Galvaliz 77'	Report		Stadium: Estadio Tiburcio Carías Andino; Referee: Iván Barton (SLV) Starting XI: 19 – Rougier; 2 – Montes; 5 – Pereira; 8 – Martínez; 10 – Galvaliz; 11 – Vega (substituted off) 46'; 16 – Castellanos; 21 – Moreira (substituted off) 80'; 31 – Sánchez; 34 – López; 35 – Meléndez (substituted off) 46'; Substitutes; 22 – Estupiñán (substituted on) 46'; 18 – Crisanto (substituted on) 46'; 12 – Santos (substituted on) 80'
Note: F.C. Motagua made their debut at this newly competition. It was their second official pairing against a Belizean club and their first one against Belmopan Bandits in particular.

7 August 2018 Round of 16	Belmopan Bandits (Belize)	0–1	(Honduras) Motagua	Belmopan, Belize
18:00		Report	56' Moreira	Stadium: Isidoro Beaton Stadium; Referee: Juan Calderón (CRC) Starting XI: 19 – Rougier; 2 – Montes; 3 – Figueroa; 6 – Mayorquín; 8 – Martínez; 10 – Galvaliz; 12 – Santos; 14 – Bernárdez; 17 – Maldonado; 21 – Moreira (substituted off) 68'; 34 – López (substituted off) 74'; Substitutes; 9 – Castillo (substituted on) 68'; 18 – Crisanto (substituted on) 74' (substituted off) 81'; 22 – Estupiñán (substituted on) 81'
Note: Roberto Moreira scored his first international goal for the club.

23 August 2018 Quarterfinals	Motagua (Honduras)	3–2	(Jamaica) Portmore United	Tegucigalpa, Honduras
20:00	Montes 6' 90+4'; Castillo 24'	Report	67' Morris; 81' East	Stadium: Estadio Tiburcio Carías Andino; Referee: José Kellys (PAN) Starting XI: 19 – Rougier; 2 – Montes; 3 – Figueroa; 6 – Mayorquín (substituted off) 73'; 9 – Castillo; 10 – Galvaliz (substituted off) 86'; 12 – Santos; 14 – Bernárdez; 17 – Maldonado; 21 – Moreira (substituted off) 62'; 34 – López; Substitutes; 8 – Martínez (substituted on) 62'; 4 – Peña (substituted on) 73'; 11 – Vega (substituted on) 86'
Note: Both Juan Montes and Rubilio Castillo scored their first international goals with the club.

30 August 2018 Quarterfinals	Portmore United (Jamaica)	0–2	(Honduras) Motagua	Kingston, Jamaica
21:00 EST		Report	31' 90+2' Castillo	Stadium: National Stadium; Referee: David Gantar (CAN) Starting XI: 19 – Rougier; 2 – Montes; 3 – Figueroa (substituted off) 51'; 6 – Mayorquín; 9 – Castillo; 10 – Galvaliz (substituted off) 88'; 12 – Santos; 14 – Bernárdez (substituted off) 83'; 17 – Maldonado; 21 – Moreira; 34 – López; Substitutes; 5 – Pereira (substituted on) 51'; 31 – Sánchez (substituted on) 83'; 8 – Martínez (substituted on) 88'
Note: This was F.C. Motagua's first ever visit to Jamaica. Forward Rubilio Castillo scored twice for the first time in an international event.

20 September 2018 Semifinals	Tauro (Panama)	2–1	(Honduras) Motagua	Panama City, Panama
19:00 EST	Aguilar 12' 55' (pen.)	Report	84' Montes	Stadium: Estadio Rommel Fernández; Referee: Iván Barton (SLV) Starting XI: 19 – Rougier; 2 – Montes; 3 – Figueroa; 6 – Mayorquín; 7 – Andino (substituted off) 59'; 10 – Galvaliz (substituted off) 46'; 12 – Santos (substituted off) 59'; 16 – Castellanos; 17 – Maldonado; 21 – Moreira; 34 – López; Substitutes; 8 – Martínez (substituted on) 46'; 24 – Elvir (substituted on) 59'; 22 – Estupiñán (substituted on) 59'
Note: F.C. Motagua suffered their first loss at this competition. It was their first encounter against Tauro F.C. since 2002.

27 September 2018 Semifinals	Motagua (Honduras)	2–0	(Panama) Tauro	Tegucigalpa, Honduras
20:00	Moreira 42' (pen.); López 73'	Report		Stadium: Estadio Tiburcio Carías Andino; Referee: Walter López (GUA) Starting XI: 19 – Rougier; 2 – Montes; 3 – Figueroa; 6 – Mayorquín (substituted off) 69'; 7 – Andino (substituted off) 66'; 16 – Castellanos; 17 – Maldonado; 21 – Moreira; 22 – Estupiñán (substituted off) 85'; 24 – Elvir; 34 – López; Substitutes; 8 – Martínez (substituted on) 66'; 12 – Santos (substituted on) 69'; 9 – Castillo (substituted on) 85'
Note: With a 3–2 aggregate score, F.C. Motagua advanced to their first ever final in a tournament organized by CONCACAF. During the second half, the game was involved with controversy after referee Walter López sent off Héctor Castellanos with a double yellow card, however, he reconsider his decision after he realized the foul was made by Erick Andino.

25 October 2018 Final	Herediano (Costa Rica)	2–0	(Honduras) Motagua	Heredia, Costa Rica
20:00	Marín 23'; Cruz 62'	Report		Stadium: Estadio Eladio Rosabal Cordero; Referee: Marco Antonio Ortiz (MEX) Starting XI: 19 – Rougier; 2 – Montes; 3 – Figueroa; 6 – Mayorquín (substituted off) 67'; 9 – Castillo; 10 – Galvaliz (substituted off) 58'; 16 – Castellanos; 17 – Maldonado; 21 – Moreira (substituted off) 77'; 24 – Elvir; 34 – López; Substitutes; 8 – Martínez (substituted on) 58'; 12 – Santos (substituted on) 67'; 22 – Estupiñán (substituted on) 77'
Note: This was the first encounter between these two since 1975.

1 November 2018 Final	Motagua (Honduras)	2–1	(Costa Rica) Herediano	Tegucigalpa, Honduras
20:00	Castillo 45+1' 58'	Report	85' Marín	Stadium: Estadio Tiburcio Carías Andino; Referee: Mario Escobar (GUA) Starting XI: 19 – Rougier; 2 – Montes; 3 – Figueroa; 6 – Mayorquín (substituted off) 54'; 9 – Castillo; 10 – Galvaliz; 12 – Santos; 17 – Maldonado (substituted off) 86'; 21 – Moreira (substituted off) 74'; 24 – Elvir; 34 – López; Substitutes; 8 – Martínez (substituted on) 54'; 22 – Estupiñán (substituted on) 74'; 18 – Crisanto (substituted on) 86'
Note: With a 2–3 aggregate score, F.C. Motagua failed to obtain the trophy and lost the opportunity to advance to the 2019 CONCACAF Champions League. Forward Rubilio Castillo finished as the tournament's top goalscorer with five goals.

=== By round ===
Round	1	2	3	4	5	6	7	8	9	10	11	12	13	14	15	16	17	18	19	20	21	22	23	24	25	26	27	28	29	30	31	32	33	34	35	36
Ground	H	A	H	A	H	H	A	H	A	A	H	A	H	A	A	H	A	H	H	A	H	A	H	H	A	H	A	A	H	A	H	A	A	H	A	H
Result	W	L	W	W	L	W	D	W	D	L	W	D	W	D	W	W	W	W	W	W	W	D	D	L	L	W	W	W	L	L	W	D	L	W	W	D
Position	3	6	3	2	2	2	4	2	2	5	3	2	1	4	1	1	1	1	1	1	1	1	1	1	1	1	1	1	1	2	2	2	2	2	2	2

A = Away; H = Home; W = Win; D = Draw; L = Loss; P = Postponed

== Statistics ==
- As of 2 June 2019

Competition	GP	GW	GD	GL	GS	GC	GD	CS	SG	Per
League	46	26	11	9	73	32	+41	22	9	64.49%
Honduran Cup	1	0	0	1	1	2	–1	0	0	0.00%
CONCACAF League	8	6	0	2	13	7	+6	4	1	75.00%
Others	5	2	2	1	7	5	+2	2	0	53.33%
Totals	60	34	13	13	94	46	+48	28	10	63.89%
