= Honduran Superclásico =

Football rivalry in Honduras

- Other names: Clásico Capitalino
- Location: Tegucigalpa
- Teams: Motagua; Olimpia
- First meeting: Motagua 2–1 Olimpia; 12 March 1929
- Latest meeting: Olimpia 3–0 Motagua; 22 october 2023
- Stadiums: Estadio Nacional

Statistics
- Total meetings: 267
- Most wins: Olimpia (99)
- Top scorer: Velásquez (14)
- All-time series: Olimpia: 99; Drawn: 107; Motagua: 61
- Largest victory: Motagua 0–4 Olimpia; 15 April 2007; Olimpia 4–0 Motagua; 6 November 2022

The Clasico Capitalino (Capital's Derby), also known as the local derby played between F.C. Motagua and C.D. Olimpia. These two teams lead the Honduran Football League as most frequent holders of the championship trophy, and their rivalry is the biggest one in the country. Olimpia wears the white uniform, with blue and red highlights. Their mascot is a lion. Olimpia is the oldest team in the league and holds the largest number of championship titles.

Motagua wears a navy blue uniform. It is nearly as old a team as Olimpia. Motagua’s mascot is an eagle and has the second largest number of championship titles.

The rivalry is so big that in 1949 Carlos Valladares' uniform was burned on the field because he left Motagua to play with Olimpia. The first ever recorded Superclásico was a friendly played on 12 March 1929, when Motagua prevailed 2–1. The first official match was played on 8 August 1965, with Olimpia winning 3–0.

All stats accurate as of match played 6 November 2022.

== The Finals ==
Motagua and Olimpia had faced in nine finals since the beginning of the professional league in 1965–66, 7 won by Motagua and 2 by Olimpia. The extra game played in 1970–71 for the title is not technically a final.

Season	Winners	Agg. score	Runners-up
1997–98 A	F.C. Motagua	1–0	C.D. Olimpia
1999–2000 A	F.C. Motagua	0–0 (6–5 pen.)	C.D. Olimpia
1999–2000 C	F.C. Motagua	2–2 (3–2 pen.)	C.D. Olimpia
2006–07 A	F.C. Motagua	4–2	C.D. Olimpia
2009–10 C	C.D. Olimpia	3–2	F.C. Motagua
2010–11 C	F.C. Motagua	5–3	C.D. Olimpia
2014–15 C	C.D. Olimpia	2–1	F.C. Motagua
2018–19 A	F.C. Motagua	2–1	C.D. Olimpia
2018–19 C	F.C. Motagua	3–2	C.D. Olimpia

== Historic matches ==
=== Decisive encounters ===
12 March 1929 Friendly	Motagua	2–1	Olimpia	Tegucigalpa
(UTC−06:00)	Starting XI; Zúniga; Fúnez; Valladares; Mejía; Kaffati; Ferrera; Raudales; Ponce; Gálvez			Stadium: Campo La Isla
Note: First ever match.

30 October 1966 1966–67	Olimpia	2–1	Motagua	Tegucigalpa
(UTC−06:00)				Stadium: Estadio Nacional
Note: Olimpia secured the 1966–67 season.

9 March 1969 1968–69	Motagua	1–1	Olimpia	Tegucigalpa
(UTC−06:00)	Abrussezze		Gómez	Stadium: Estadio Nacional
Note: Motagua secured the 1968–69 season.

25 April 1971 1970–71	Motagua	1–1	Olimpia	Tegucigalpa
(UTC−06:00)	Colón		Brand	Stadium: Estadio Nacional
Note: Extra match for the title; Motagua won the 1970–71 season by goal difference.

11 February 1979 1979 CF	Motagua	1–1	Olimpia	Tegucigalpa
(UTC−06:00)				Stadium: Estadio Nacional
Note: First international encounter.

6 February 1991 1990–91	Olimpia	0–1 (a.e.t.)	Motagua	Tegucigalpa
19:30 (UTC−06:00)			Sierra 115'	Stadium: Estadio Nacional
Note: Playoff match to decide the Final round (Pentagonal) winner.

20 June 1993 1992–93	Motagua	0–3	Olimpia	Tegucigalpa
16:00 (UTC−06:00)			Pineda; Espinoza	Stadium: Estadio Nacional
Note: Olimpia secured the 1992–93 season.

4 April 1998 1997–98 A	Motagua	0–1	Olimpia	Tegucigalpa
19:30 (UTC−06:00)			Pineda	Stadium: Estadio Nacional
Note: Motagua eliminates Olimpia in semifinals after a 2–2 aggregate.

8 July 2001 2000–01 C	Olimpia	1–1	Motagua	Tegucigalpa
16:00 (UTC−06:00)	Tosello		Nolasco	Stadium: Estadio Nacional
Note: Olimpia eliminates Motagua in the Final round (Hexagonal) after a 3–2 aggregate.

9 December 2001 2001–02 A	Motagua	4–2	Olimpia	Tegucigalpa
16:00 (UTC−06:00)	García 26'; Pacini 32' 39'; Mejía 87'		Velásquez 5'; Costa 37'	Stadium: Estadio Nacional; Referee: Óscar Bardales
Note: Motagua eliminates Olimpia in semifinals after a 4–3 aggregate.

18 May 2003 2002–03 C	Olimpia	0–2	Motagua	Tegucigalpa
16:00 (UTC−06:00)			Valladares 85'; Martínez 90'	Stadium: Estadio Nacional; Attendance: 27,000
Note: Motagua eliminates Olimpia in semifinals after a 4–2 aggregate.

14 May 2006 2005–06 C	Olimpia	2–1	Motagua	Tegucigalpa
16:00 (UTC−06:00)	Emílio		Torlacoff 90' (pen.)	Stadium: Estadio Nacional
Note: Olimpia eliminates Motagua in semifinals after a 2–2 aggregate.

10 May 2008 2007–08 C	Olimpia	3–1	Motagua	Comayagua
16:00 (UTC−06:00)	Turcios 19'; Bruschi 42'; Velásquez 62'	Report	Nascimento 38'	Stadium: Estadio Carlos Miranda; Referee: José Pineda
Note: Olimpia eliminates Motagua in semifinals after a 7–2 aggregate.

10 November 2009 2009–10 C	Motagua	0–2	Olimpia	Tegucigalpa
19:30 (UTC−06:00)		Report	Rojas 14'; Turcios 85'	Stadium: Estadio Nacional; Referee: José Pineda
Note: Olimpia eliminates Motagua in semifinals after a 2–1 aggregate.

7 December 2014 2014–15 A	Olimpia	1–1	Motagua	Tegucigalpa
16:00 (UTC−06:00)	Quioto 38'	Report	62' Discua	Stadium: Estadio Nacional; Referee: Armando Castro
Note: Motagua eliminates Olimpia in semifinals after a 2–1 aggregate.

5 December 2015 2015–16 A	Motagua	1–1	Olimpia	Tegucigalpa
19:00 (UTC−06:00)	López 84'	Report	21' Quioto	Stadium: Estadio Nacional; Attendance: 15,058; Referee: Armando Castro
Note: Motagua eliminates Olimpia in semifinals after a 2–2 aggregate.

15 May 2016 2015–16 C	Olimpia	2–0	Motagua	Tegucigalpa
16:00 (UTC−06:00)	Costly 34'; Quioto 43'	Report		Stadium: Estadio Nacional; Referee: Óscar Moncada
Note: Olimpia eliminates Motagua in semifinals after a 2–0 aggregate.

4 December 2016 2016–17 A	Olimpia	1–1	Motagua	Tegucigalpa
16:00 (UTC−06:00)	Estupiñán 45+2'	Report	31' Pereira	Stadium: Estadio Nacional; Referee: Melvin Matamoros
Note: Motagua eliminates Olimpia in semifinals after a 2–1 aggregate.

23 December 2017 2017–18 A	Motagua	3–1	Olimpia	Tegucigalpa
15:00 (UTC−06:00)	Vega 48'; Castillo 55' 74'	Report	3' Velásquez	Stadium: Estadio Nacional; Attendance: Closed gates Referee: Melvin Matamoros
Note: Motagua eliminates Olimpia in semifinals after a 3–3 aggregate.

6 May 2018 2017–18 C	Motagua	1–1	Olimpia	Tegucigalpa
16:00 (UTC−06:00)	Martínez 77'	Report	39' Costly	Stadium: Estadio Nacional; Referee: Óscar Moncada
Note: Motagua eliminates Olimpia in semifinals after a 1–1 aggregate.

2 December 2020 2020 CL	Olimpia	2–0	Motagua	Tegucigalpa
21:15 (UTC−06:00)	Núñez 32'; Flores 54'			Stadium: Estadio Nacional; Attendance: Closed gates Referee: Adonai Escobedo (MEX)
Note: Olimpia eliminates Motagua in quarterfinals after a 2–0 aggregate.

10 January 2021 2020–21 A	Olimpia	0–0	Motagua	Tegucigalpa
16:00 (UTC−06:00)		Report		Stadium: Estadio Nacional; Attendance: Closed gates Referee: Melvin Matamoros
Note: Olimpia eliminates Motagua in playoff finals after a 3–1 aggregate.

19 May 2021 2020–21 C	Olimpia	1–0	Motagua	Tegucigalpa
19:00 (UTC−06:00)	Bengtson 44'	Report		Stadium: Estadio Nacional; Attendance: Closed gates Referee: Saíd Martínez
	Penalties
	Alvarado (penalty scored); Leverón (penalty missed); Hernández (penalty scored); Flores (penalty scored); Bengtson (penalty scored)		(penalty missed) Moreira; (penalty scored) García; (penalty scored) Decas; (penalty scored) Villafranca; (penalty missed) Martínez
Note: Olimpia eliminates Motagua in playoff finals after a 2–2 aggregate (4–3 on penalty shoot-outs).

15 May 2022 2021–22 C	Olimpia	0–1	Motagua	Tegucigalpa
17:00 (UTC−06:00)		Report	5' Moreira	Stadium: Estadio Nacional; Referee: Melvin Matamoros
Note: Motagua eliminates Olimpia in semifinals after a 2–1 aggregate.

11 October 2022 2022 CL	Olimpia	1–0	Motagua	Tegucigalpa
20:15 (UTC−06:00)	Sánchez 87'	Report		Stadium: Estadio Nacional; Referee: Iván Cisneros (SLV)
Note: Olimpia eliminates Motagua in semifinals after a 1–0 aggregate.

=== Matches outside Tegucigalpa ===
30 November 1975 1975–76	Olimpia	1–2	Motagua	San Pedro Sula
	Gómez		Hernández; Godoy	Stadium: Estadio General Francisco Morazán

10 September 1978 1978–79	Motagua	0–0	Olimpia	Danlí
				Stadium: Estadio Marcelo Tinoco

2 December 1989 1989–90	Olimpia	4–1	Motagua	San Pedro Sula
	Laje; Pineda		Villalobos	Stadium: Estadio General Francisco Morazán

19 February 2006 2005–06 C	Motagua	1–0	Olimpia	Comayagua
16:00	Santana			Stadium: Estadio Carlos Miranda

17 December 2006 2006–07 A	Olimpia	1–3	Motagua	San Pedro Sula
16:00	Figueroa 21'		40' Bernárdez; 56' Nascimento; 90+1' Guzmán	Stadium: Estadio Olímpico Metropolitano; Attendance: 38,256; Referee: Mario Moncada

7 May 2008 2007–08 C	Motagua	1–4	Olimpia	Danlí
15:00	Matamoros 47'		21' Bruschi; 49' Thomas; 54' R. Núñez; 78' M. Núñez	Stadium: Estadio Marcelo Tinoco; Attendance: 5,291; Referee: Mario Moncada

10 May 2008 2007–08 C	Olimpia	3–1	Motagua	Comayagua
19:00	Turcios 19'; Bruschi 42'; Velásquez 62'		38' Nascimento	Stadium: Estadio Carlos Miranda; Referee: José Pineda

9 September 2017 2017–18 A	Motagua	1–1	Olimpia	Choluteca
18:00	Castillo 42'		3' Costly	Stadium: Estadio Emilio Williams Agasse; Attendance: 5,545; Referee: Melvin Matamoros

6 October 2019 2019–20 A	Motagua	1–2	Olimpia	Comayagua
16:00	Estigarribia 45'		29' Garrido; 51' Benguché	Stadium: Estadio Carlos Miranda; Referee: Óscar Moncada

3 November 2019 2019–20 A	Olimpia	2–0	Motagua	San Pedro Sula
17:00	Benguché 46' 55'			Stadium: Estadio Olímpico Metropolitano; Referee: Saíd Martínez

30 November 2019 2019–20 A	Olimpia	2–0	Motagua	San Pedro Sula
17:00	Benguché 2'; Bengtson 52'			Stadium: Estadio Olímpico Metropolitano; Referee: Malvin Matamoros

2 February 2020 2019–20 C	Olimpia	1–2	Motagua	San Pedro Sula
16:00	Arboleda 22'		13' Moreira; 43' Klusener	Stadium: Estadio Olímpico Metropolitano; Attendance: 6,062; Referee: Malvin Matamoros

14 March 2020 2019–20 C	Motagua	4–1	Olimpia	Comayagua
15:30	Castillo 22'; Mayorquín 36'; López 59' 77'		4' Bengtson	Stadium: Estadio Carlos Miranda; Attendance: Closed gates Referee: Óscar Moncada

12 February 2022 2021–22 C	Olimpia	1–1	Motagua	San Pedro Sula
19:00	Velásquez 86'		12' Moreira	Stadium: Estadio General Francisco Morazán; Referee: Nelson Salgado

6 November 2022 2022–23 A	Olimpia	4–0	Motagua	San Pedro Sula
18:00	Araújo 52'; Bengtson 56'; Chirinos 63'; Álvarez 79'			Stadium: Estadio General Francisco Morazán; Attendance: 10,527; Referee: Nelson Salgado

=== Largest victories ===
1954 1954–55	Motagua	5–1	Olimpia	Tegucigalpa
				Stadium: Estadio Nacional

18 July 1992 1992 HC	Olimpia	5–0	Motagua	Tegucigalpa
	Williams; Costa; Pineda; Espinoza; Cruz			Stadium: Estadio Nacional

15 April 2007 2006–07 C	Motagua	0–4	Olimpia	Tegucigalpa
16:00			16' Velásquez; 48' Palacios; 55' Navas; 82' Cárcamo	Stadium: Estadio Nacional

6 November 2022 2022–23 A	Olimpia	4–0	Motagua	San Pedro Sula
18:00	Araújo 52'; Bengtson 56'; Chirinos 63'; Álvarez 79'			Stadium: Estadio General Francisco Morazán; Attendance: 10,527; Referee: Nelson Salgado

== Head to Head ==
Chart Motagua vs Olimpia since 1965-66 to present.

This is a list of head to head encounters in every different stages.

MW = Motagua's win | OW = Olimpia's win | D = Drawn | MG = Motagua's goals | OG = Olimpia's goals

Professional era
By stage	MW	OW	D	MG	OG
Regular season	41	75	75	150	206
Hexagonales	0	1	1	2	3
Pentagonales	3	8	7	10	21
Cuadrangulares	1	2	2	5	6
Semi-finals	9	10	9	28	30
Playoff Finals	1	1	2	3	5
Finals	6	9	3	20	15
Extra matches	1	1	1	2	3
Totals	61	107	99	221	290
Amateur era
Played from 1947–1964	10	6	15	43	50
International competitions
UNCAF / CONCACAF	1	2	2	2	4
Grand totals
All competitions	72	115	116	266	344

== Common results ==
Result	Score	Times
Tie	0–0	49
Tie	1–1	49
Olimpia's win	1–0	36
Motagua's win	1–0	27
Olimpia's win	2–1	25
Motagua's win	2–1	17
Olimpia's win	2–0	16
Motagua's win	2–0	9
Olimpia's win	3–1	9
Tie	2–2	7
Olimpia's win	4–1	5
Motagua's win	3–1	4
Olimpia's win	3–0	3
Tie	3–3	2
Olimpia's win	3–2	2
Motagua's win	3–2	2
Olimpia's win	4–0	2
Olimpia's win	5–4	1
Motagua's win	4–2	1
Motagua's win	4–1	1
Total		267

== Series won by club ==
- Won by Olimpia: 37
  - 1965–66, 1966–67, 1969–70, 1973–74, 1979–80, 1984–85, 1987–88, 1988–89, 1989–90, 1990–91, 1992–93, 1993–94, 1994–95, 1995–96, 1996–97, 1998–99, 1999–00 A, 2000–01 C, 2002–03 A, 2003–04 A, 2004–05 A, 2004–05 C, 2005–06 A, 2008–09 C, 2009–10 A, 2010–11 A, 2011–12 A, 2012–13 A, 2012–13 C, 2013–14 C, 2014–15 C, 2015–16 C, 2017–18 C, 2018–19 A, 2019–20 A, 2020–21 A, 2020–21 C.
- Won by Motagua: 21
  - 1968–69, 1974–75, 1975–76, 1976–77, 1978–79, 1980–81, 1981–82, 1985–86, 1999–00 C, 2001–02 A, 2001–02 C, 2002–03 C, 2007–08 A, 2008–09 A, 2009–10 C, 2010–11 C, 2014–15 A, 2015–16 A, 2018–19 C, 2019–20 C, 2021–22 A.
- Series tied: 21
  - 1967–68, 1970–71, 1971–72, 1977–78, 1982–83, 1983–84, 1986–87, 1991–92, 1997–98 A, 1997–98 C, 2000–01 A, 2003–04 C, 2005–06 C, 2006–07 A, 2006–07 C, 2007–08 C, 2013–14 A, 2016–17 A, 2016–17 C, 2017–18 A, 2021–22 C.

== Players ==
=== All-time top scorers ===
List of top scorers for both clubs.

Player	Played for	Goals
(Honduras) Wilmer Velásquez	Olimpia	14
(Honduras) Rubilio Castillo	Motagua	11
(Honduras) Jerry Bengtson	Motagua / Olimpia	10
(Honduras) Ángel Obando	Motagua	9
(Honduras) Alex Pineda	Olimpia	8
(Argentina) Danilo Tosello	Olimpia	8
(Honduras) Roger Rojas	Olimpia	8
(Honduras) Prudencio Norales	Olimpia	7
(Brazil) Denilson Costa	Motagua / Olimpia	7
(Uruguay) Ramiro Bruschi	Olimpia	7
(Paraguay) Roberto Moreira	Motagua	7
(Honduras) Jorge Bran	Olimpia	6
(Uruguay) Carlos Laje	Olimpia	6
(Honduras) Anthony Lozano	Olimpia	6
(Honduras) Romell Quioto	Olimpia	6
(Honduras) Carlo Costly	Olimpia	6
(Honduras) Óscar Hernández	Motagua	5
(Chile) Mario Iubini	Motagua	5
(Honduras) Luis Reyes	Motagua	5
(Honduras) Amado Guevara	Motagua	5
(Honduras) Carlos Discua	Motagua	5

=== Currently active scorers ===
This is a list of those active players who have scored against one or both teams.

Motagua
Roberto Moreira 7
Marcelo Pereira 3
Eddie Hernández 2, (he also scored 2 goals for Olimpia)
Walter Martínez 2
Óscar García 1
Josué Villafranca 1
Cristopher Meléndez 1
Juan Delgado 1
Mauro Ortiz 1

Olimpia
Jerry Bengtson 7, (he also scored 4 goals for Motagua)
Justin Arboleda 3
Michaell Chirinos 4
Éver Alvarado 1
Matías Garrido 1
Diego Reyes 1
José García 1
José Pinto 1
Brayan Velásquez 1
Gabriel Araújo 1
Jorge Álvarez 1

=== Players that played for both teams ===
List of players who switched from one club to the other:

Player	Playing for Motagua	Playing for Olimpia
(Honduras) Félix Carranza	missing	missing
(Honduras) Isidro Arriola	missing	missing
(Uruguay) Jorge Roldán	missing	missing
(Honduras) Rafael Sauceda	1973–74	1971–72
(Honduras) Alfredo Hawit	1976–77	1974–76
(Honduras) Marco López	1978	1975–77
(Chile) Mario Iubini	1976–77, 1979–81	1978–79, 1981–82
(Honduras) Denis Allen	1980	1974–76
(Honduras) Salomón Nazar	1980–81	1979–80
(Brazil) José Januario	1981	1980
(Honduras) Gilberto Yearwood	1988–89	1986–87, 1991–94
(Honduras) Patrocinio Sierra	1989–92	1986–89
(Honduras) Carlos Solís	1990s	1980s
(Uruguay) Juan Contreras	1991–92	1987–89
(Paraguay) Emiliano Fernández	1990–91	1988–89
(Uruguay) Vicente Viera	1991–92	1987–91
(Honduras) Amado Guevara	1994–2000, 2007–08, 2010–13	1992–93
(Brazil) Denilson Costa	1995–97	1991–95, 1997–2002
(Uruguay) Álvaro Izquierdo	1992–94	1996–97
(Honduras) Marlon Hernández	1997–98	1992–96, 1998–2001
(Honduras) José Romero	1991–1997	1998–2000
(Honduras) Saúl Martínez	2001, 2007	2000
(Argentina) Gustavo Fuentes	1999–2000	2001–02
(Uruguay) Hugo Domínguez	2001–02	2001
(Honduras) Carlos Paes	2002	1999–2001
(Honduras) Juan Raudales	1996–2002	2002–03
(Honduras) Hugo Caballero	1997–2002, 2004–06	2002–03
(Honduras) Luis Oseguera	2002–03	1999–2001
(Honduras) Henry Enamorado	2002–05	missing
(Argentina) Diego de Rosa	2004–05	2001
(Honduras) Danilo Turcios	2001	2005–06, 2007–11
(Honduras) Elvis Scott	2005–06	2001–02, 2003–04
(Honduras) Jairo Martínez	1997–2000, 2002–05, 2006–08	2005–06
(Brazil) Marcelo Ferreira	2005–06	2000–01, 2003–05
(Honduras) Jerry Palacios	2005–06	2001–05, 2006, 2007–08
(Honduras) Limber Pérez	2005–07	2002–03
(Honduras) Noel Valladares	1997–2005	2005–16
(Honduras) Fabio Ulloa	2006	1994–2005
(Argentina) Juan Yalet	2003–04	2006
(Honduras) Miguel Castillo	2006–09	2001–02, 2009–12
(Honduras) Fernando Castillo	2007–09	2006
(Honduras) Mauricio Castro	2002–04	2007–08
(Argentina) José Pacini	2001–02, 2005	2007
(Honduras) Walter López	2007–08	2004–07
(Honduras) Horacio Parham	2008–09	2005–08
(Honduras) Jaime Rosales	2000–01	2008–09
(Honduras) José Burgos	2008–09	2002–08
(Honduras) Reynaldo Tilguath	2008–09	1999–2008, 2009–15
(Honduras) Roy Posas	2003–05, 2007–08	2009
(Honduras) Sergio Mendoza	2009–12	2006–09
(Honduras) Rubén Matamoros	2004–08	2009
(Brazil) Jocimar Nascimento	2006–09, 2012–13	2009–10
(Colombia) Andrés Copete	2011	2010
(Honduras) Julio León	2011–12	2001
(Honduras) Carlos Discua	2011–15, 2016–2018	2006–08, 2009
(Honduras) Javier Portillo	2009–10	2011–15, 2020–22
(Honduras) Nery Medina	2002–05, 2012–13	2013–14
(Honduras) José García	2013–14	2010–12
(Honduras) Irvin Reyna	2014–17	2007–10, 2012–13
(Honduras) Erick Andino	2015–2020	2010–11, 2012–14
(Honduras) Néstor Martínez	2015–16	2010–12, 2013–15
(Honduras) Marvin Barrios	2012–15	2016
(Honduras) Luis Garrido	2016	2008–17
(Honduras) Dembor Bengtson	2016	2017
(Honduras) Maylor Núñez	2014–16, 2018	2018–
(Colombia) Javier Estupiñán	2018	2015–17
(Honduras) Jerry Bengtson	2010–12	2018–
(Honduras) Deiby Flores	2013–18	2018–2021
(Honduras) Óscar Salas	2019	2012–18
(Honduras) Harold Fonseca	2012–15, 2016–19	2019–2021
(Honduras) Johnny Leverón	2009–13	2019–2021
(Honduras) Eddie Hernández	2013–17, 2022–	2019–2022
(Honduras) Óscar García	2021–	2009–11
(Honduras) Elmer Güity	2021	2014–17, 2018–20
(Honduras) Carlos Sánchez	2018–19	2022–
(Honduras) Juan Montes	2013–21	2022–
(Honduras) Kevin López	2014–22	2023–
(Honduras) Kevin Álvarez	2023–	2013–19
(Honduras) Jack Jean-Baptiste	2018–22	2023–

=== Players who scored for both sides ===
Only nine players have scored goals in this derby wearing both kits.

- (Brazil) José Januario
- (Brazil) Denilson Costa
- (Uruguay) Álvaro Izquierdo
- (Honduras) Marlon Hernández
- (Honduras) José Romero
- (Argentina) Gustavo Fuentes
- (Colombia) Javier Estupiñán
- (Honduras) Jerry Bengtson
- (Honduras) Eddie Hernández

== Coaches ==
Ramón Maradiaga has coached 44 matches against Olimpia winning 15, drawing 14 and losing 15.
