= Gabriel Araújo =

Gabriel Araújo may refer to:

- Gabriel Araújo (footballer) (born 1992), Brazilian footballer
- Gabriel Araújo (swimmer) (born 2002), Brazilian Paralympic swimmer
