= Ryduan Palermo =

Argentine footballer

Personal information
- Full name: Ryduan Palermo Dutra
- Date of birth: 24 July 1996 (age 30)
- Place of birth: La Plata, Argentina
- Height: 1.85 m (6 ft 1 in)
- Position: Centre-forward

Team information
- Current team: Martina

Youth career
- Estudiantes
- 2015–2018: Arsenal de Sarandí

Senior career*
| Years | Team | Apps | (Gls) |
| 2018–2019 | Arsenal de Sarandí | 0 | (0) |
| 2018 | → Santiago Morning (loan) | 6 | (1) |
| 2019–2020 | Tlaxcala | 14 | (4) |
| 2020–2021 | Marathón | 23 | (4) |
| 2021–2022 | Lenense | 31 | (7) |
| 2022–2023 | Villacidrese | | |
| 2023–2024 | Martina | 34 | (16) |
| 2024–2025 | Carrarese | 0 | (0) |
| 2024–2025 | → Team Altamura (loan) | 21 | (2) |
| 2025– | Martina | 0 | (0) |

International career
- Argentina U17
- * Club domestic league appearances and goals as of 27 April 2025

Ryduan Palermo Dutra (born 24 July 1996) is an Argentine professional footballer as a centre-forward for Italian Serie D club Martina.

== Club career ==
Palermo came through the ranks at Estudiantes prior to moving to Arsenal de Sarandí in early 2015. He wouldn't appear at senior level for them, though would make the substitute's bench once for a 2–1 defeat away to Newell's Old Boys on 27 January 2018. In the succeeding August, Palermo headed out on loan to Chilean football with Santiago Morning. He debuted in a 4–0 loss away to Cobresal on 19 August, having replaced Diego Cerón after fifty-five minutes. Five further appearances arrived, which culminated with the centre-forward netting his first senior goal in his last match on 8 November against Cobresal.

Palermo terminated his Arsenal contract on 4 July 2019, subsequently securing a contract with Liga Premier de México side Tlaxcala. He scored on debut in a win over Reboceros de La Piedad on 24 August, with further goals following in 2019–20 against Atlético San Luis Premier and Irapuato (2). He also featured twice in the Torneo Internacional Premier, which they won. In September 2020, Palermo switched Mexico for Honduras after joining Marathón of Liga Nacional. His first appearance arrived in a draw away to Honduras Progreso on 3 October, almost two months before his first goal came in a 3–0 win over Platense.

After a season in Spain with Lenense, Palermo moved to Italy, joining amateur clubs Villacidrese and Martina. Following a positive season in Serie D with Martina, Palermo won interest from newly promoted Serie B club Carrarese, who signed him on a two-year contract in July 2024. On 30 August 2024, Carrarese loaned him to Team Altamura in Serie C.

After returning from his loan at Team Altamura, on 12 August 2025, Palermo was released by Carrarese.

== International career ==
In March 2012, Palermo was called up by the Argentina U17s by manager Walter Perazzo.

== Personal life ==
Ryduan is the son of former Argentina international footballer Martín Palermo and Brazilian model Jaqueline Dutra.

== Career statistics ==
As of 21 March 2021.

Appearances and goals by club, season and competition
| Club | Season | League | | | Cup | | League Cup | | Continental | | Other | | Total | |
| Club | Season | Division | Apps | Goals | Apps | Goals | Apps | Goals | Apps | Goals | Apps | Goals | Apps | Goals |
|---|---|---|---|---|---|---|---|---|---|---|---|---|---|---|
| Arsenal de Sarandí | 2017–18 | Primera División | 0 | 0 | 0 | 0 | — | | — | | 0 | 0 | 0 | 0 |
| Arsenal de Sarandí | 2018–19 | Primera Nacional | 0 | 0 | 0 | 0 | — | | — | | 0 | 0 | 0 | 0 |
| Arsenal de Sarandí | Total | | 0 | 0 | 0 | 0 | — | | — | | 0 | 0 | 0 | 0 |
| Santiago Morning (loan) | 2018 | Primera B | 6 | 1 | 0 | 0 | — | | — | | 0 | 0 | 6 | 1 |
| Tlaxcala | 2019–20 | Liga Premier | 14 | 4 | 0 | 0 | — | | — | | 2 (Note: Appearance(s) in the Torneo Internacional Premier) | 0 | 16 | 4 |
| Marathón | 2020–21 | Liga Nacional | 22 | 4 | 0 | 0 | — | | 3 (Note: Appearance(s) in the CONCACAF League) | 0 | 0 | 0 | 25 | 4 |
| Career total | | | 42 | 9 | 0 | 0 | — | | 3 | 0 | 2 | 0 | 47 | 9 |

== Honours ==
Tlaxcala

- Torneo Internacional Premier: 2019
