= Bruno Volpi =

Argentine footballer

Personal information
- Full name: Bruno Volpi
- Date of birth: 23 June 1993 (age 33)
- Place of birth: Quilmes, Argentina
- Height: 1.90 m (6 ft 3 in)
- Position: Forward

Team information
- Current team: Marathón
- Number: 20

Senior career*
Years	Team	Apps	(Gls)
2015–2018	Ituzaingó	89	(21)
2018–2019	San Miguel	25	(1)
2019	Platense	17	(7)
2020–	Marathón	32	(11)
- * Club domestic league appearances and goals as of 20 January 2021

Bruno Volpi (born 23 June 1993) is an Argentine professional footballer who plays as a forward for Honduran club Marathón.

== Early life ==
Volpi was born in the city of Quilmes in Greater Buenos Aires.

== Club career ==
=== Ituzaingó ===
Volpi began playing for Primera D Metropolitana side Ituzaingó in 2015. In his first three seasons, he scored fifteen goals in 55 appearances and won the league championship in 2016–17. The following season, the club played in the Primera C Metropolitana, where he scored six goals in 34 appearances.

=== San Miguel ===
In 2018, Volpi signed with Primera B Metropolitana side San Miguel, and scored one goal in 25 appearances that season.

=== Platense ===
In 2019, Volpi signed with Honduran Liga Nacional side Platense, scoring seven goals in seventeen appearances in the Apertura season that year.

=== Marathón ===
Ahead of the 2020 Clausura season in Honduras, Volpi switched to Marathón. He made thirteen appearances that season, scoring four goals. The following season, he made his continental debut in CONCACAF League.

== Career statistics ==
As of 8 December 2020

Club statistics
Club	Season	League			National Cup		Continental (Note: Includes appearances in CONCACAF League.)		Other		Total	
Club	Season	Division	Apps	Goals	Apps	Goals	Apps	Goals	Apps	Goals	Apps	Goals
Ituzaingó	2015	Primera D Metropolitana	?	?	—		—		0	0	?	?
Ituzaingó	2016	Primera D Metropolitana	?	?	—		—		0	0	?	?
Ituzaingó	2016–17	Primera D Metropolitana	?	?	—		—		0	0	?	?
Ituzaingó	2017–18	Primera C Metropolitana	34	6	—		—		0	0	34	6
Ituzaingó	Total		89	21	0	0	0	0	0	0	89	21
San Miguel	2018–19	Primera B Metropolitana	25	1	—		—		0	0	6	2
Platense	2019–20	Honduran Liga Nacional	17	7	—		—		0	0	17	7
Marathón	2019–20	Honduran Liga Nacional	13	4	—		—		0	0	13	4
Marathón	2020–21	Honduran Liga Nacional	13	5	—		3	0	0	0	16	5
Marathón	Total		26	9	0	0	3	0	0	0	29	9
Career total			157	38	0	0	3	0	0	0	160	38
