= Carlos Padilla (footballer) =

Honduran footballer (1934–2014)

Personal information
- Full name: Carlos Antonio Padilla Velásquez
- Date of birth: 17 January 1934
- Place of birth: Caridad, Honduras
- Date of death: 6 January 2014 (aged 79)

Senior career*
Years	Team	Apps	(Gls)
1950s	Motagua		

Managerial career
- 1960: Águila
- 1961: Troya
- 1965–1967: Platense
- 1968–1969: Honduras
- 1970–1975: Motagua
- 1975–1979: España / Real España
- 1980–1982: Atlético Morazán
- 1982–1983: Motagua
- 1986–1987: Universidad
- 1988: Olimpia
- 1996–1997: Marathón
- 1998–1999: Platense
- 1999–2000: Federal
- 2003–2004: Valencia
- * Club domestic league appearances and goals

Carlos Antonio Padilla Velásquez (17 January 1934 – 6 January 2014) was a Honduran footballer and manager who has the record of winning the most titles as coach in the Honduran football league.

== Managerial career ==
Nicknamed el Zorro, Padilla managed F.C. Motagua for a record 141 matches from 19 July 1970 to 18 May 1975 (1,764 days).

He is the only manager in Honduran league history to win titles with four different sides.

== Titles ==
- 1960 — Champion with Águila (SLV).
- 1965–66 — Champion with Platense (HON).
- 1970–71 — Champion with Motagua (HON).
- 1973–74 — Champion with Motagua (HON).
- 1974–75 — Runner-up with Motagua (HON).
- 1975–76 — Champion with España (HON).
- 1976–77 — Champion with España (HON).
- 1977–78 — Runner-up with Real España (HON).
- 1979–80 — Promotion with Atlético Morazán (HON).
- 1981–82 — Runner-up with Atlético Morazán (HON).
- 1982–83 — Runner-up with Motagua (HON).
- 1986–87 — Promotion with Universidad (HON).
- 1987–88 — Champion with Olimpia (HON).
- 2003–04 — Promotion with Valencia (HON).

== Personal life ==
Padilla is the grandfather of the footballer Luis Argeñal.
