= Ilce Barahona =

Honduran footballer (born 1998)

Personal information
- Full name: Ilce Fernando Barahona Castillo
- Date of birth: 27 September 1998 (age 28)
- Place of birth: Puerto Cortés, Honduras
- Height: 1.69 m (5 ft 6 1/2 in)
- Position: Midfielder

Team information
- Current team: Platense
- Number: 32

Senior career*
Years	Team	Apps	(Gls)
2014–	Platense	48	(7)

International career^{‡}
2020–	Honduras	4	(0)
- * Club domestic league appearances and goals as of 23:02, 24 March 2021 (UTC) ‡ National team caps and goals as of 23:02, 24 March 2021 (UTC)

Ilce Fernando Barahona Castillo (born 27 September 1998) is a Honduran professional footballer who plays as a midfielder for Platense in the Honduran Liga Nacional.

== Career ==
Barahona is a youth product of Platense, having spent his whole life in his hometown Puerto Cortés. Barahona made his professional debut with Platense in a 2–1 Liga Nacional loss to C.D. Real Sociedad on 21 September 2014.

== International career ==
Barahona made his senior debut with the Honduras national team in a friendly 1–1 tie Nicaragua on 11 October 2020.
