= Cristian Sacaza =

Honduran footballer (born 1998)

Personal information
- Full name: Cristian Javier Sacaza Brian
- Date of birth: 18 August 1998 (age 28)
- Place of birth: Balfate, Honduras
- Height: 1.75 m (5 ft 9 in)
- Position: Forward

Team information
- Current team: Marathon
- Number: 30

Senior career*
Years	Team	Apps	(Gls)
- Atletico Pinares
2020—2023	Honduras Progreso	63	(13)
2022	Vida	32	(5)
2023–	Marathon	76	(5)

International career^{‡}
2022–	Honduras	4	(0)
- * Club domestic league appearances and goals as of 21:33, 5 May 2026 ‡ National team caps and goals as of 02:07, 5 May 2026

Cristian Javier Sacaza Brian (born 18 August 1998) is a Honduran professional footballer who plays as a forward for Marathon and the Honduras national team

== International career ==
Sacaza made his national debut in the qualifying rounds of the 2022 FIFA World Cup qualification – CONCACAF third round in a match against Panama
