= Luis Argeñal =

Honduran footballer (born 1997)

Personal information
- Full name: Luis Fernando Argeñal Padilla
- Date of birth: 8 December 1997 (age 28)
- Place of birth: Tegucigalpa, Honduras
- Position: Midfielder

Team information
- Current team: Parrillas One
- Number: 18

Senior career*
| Years | Team | Apps | (Gls) |
| 2018–2023 | UPNFM | 36 | (1) |
| 2023 | Platense | | |
| 2024-Present | Parrillas One | | |
- * Club domestic league appearances and goals as of 08:02, 5 June 2025 (UTC) ‡ National team caps and goals as of 23:02, 5 June 2025 (UTC)

Luis Fernando Argeñal Padilla (born 8 December 1997) is a Honduran professional footballer who plays as a midfielder for Vida in the Honduran Liga Nacional.

== Career ==
Argeñal made his professional debut with UPNFM in a 1–0 Liga Nacional loss to C.D. Real de Minas on 9 September 2018.

== Personal life ==
Argeñal is the grandson of the Honduran former footballer and manager Carlos Padilla.
