= Aldair Simanca =

Colombian footballer (born 1998)

Personal information
- Full name: Aldair Simanca Peña
- Date of birth: 4 July 1998 (age 28)
- Place of birth: Montería, Colombia
- Height: 1.91 m (6 ft 3 in)
- Position: Centre-back

Youth career
- 2018: La Equidad

Senior career*
Years	Team	Apps	(Gls)
2019–2020	Real Cartagena	1	(0)
2020	Atlético Pantoja	8	(0)
2021	Platense	6	(0)
2022–2023	Universidad Central	13	(0)
2023	Patriotas Boyacá	3	(0)
2023–2024	Tigres	9	(2)
2024	Matagalpa	12	(1)
2024–2025	Melita	24	(4)
2025–2026	Borneo Samarinda	1	(0)
2026	→ PSIS Semarang (loan)	7	(0)
- * Club domestic league appearances and goals as of 25 April 2026

Aldair Simanca Peña (born 4 July 1998) is a Colombian professional footballer who plays as a centre-back.

== Club career ==
Born in Montería, Colombia, Simanca started off career in the youth team of La Equidad where he played in the 2018 U-20 Copa Libertadores. And he started his senior career with joined Real Cartagena in early January 2018. In October 2020, Simanca decided to go abroad for the first time to Dominican Republic with signed Liga Dominicana de Fútbol club Atlético Pantoja on a deal until the end of the season.

After playing with Atlético Pantoja, he move to Honduras and signed a year contract with Platense in February 2021. He made his league debut for the club on 24 February 2021 as a substituted in a 1–4 away win over Real de Minas. On 1 March 2021, in his second match against Honduras Progreso, he collided with Rolman González and hit his trachea, the impact knocking him unconscious. He was taken to hospital for intensive care.

Since 2023, he returned to Colombia where he donned the colours of Universidad Central, Patriotas Boyacá and Tigres. Last January, he joined Nicaraguan club Matagalpa, where he made 12 appearances and scored one goal.

=== Melita ===
On 24 July 2024, he signed for Maltese Premier League club Melita, Simanca joins for his first European experience, having plied his trade across various South American leagues over his career. On 17 August 2024, he scored his first league goal for the club in his debut match against Floriana despite draw 3–3.

=== Borneo Samarinda ===
On 3 August 2025, Indonesian club Borneo Samarinda announced the signing of Simanca on a deal until the end of the season.
