= Samuel Elvir =

Honduran footballer (born 2001)

Personal information
- Date of birth: 25 April 2001 (age 25)
- Place of birth: Tegucigalpa, Honduras
- Position: Midfielder

Team information
- Current team: C.D. Marathon

Samuel Iván Elvir Zúñiga (born 25 April 2001) is a Honduran professional footballer who plays as a midfielder for UPNFM.
