= Carlos Bernárdez =

Belizean footballer (born 1992)

Personal information
- Full name: Carlos Roberto Bernárdez García
- Date of birth: 28 December 1992 (age 33)
- Place of birth: Belize City, Belize
- Height: 1.84 m (6 ft 0 in)
- Position: Forward

Team information
- Current team: Platense

Senior career*
Years	Team	Apps	(Gls)
2013–2016	Victoria	70	(16)
2017–2019	Vida	38	(10)
2020–	Platense	22	(13)

International career^{‡}
2019–	Belize	16	(4)
- * Club domestic league appearances and goals as of 17 May 2021 ‡ National team caps and goals as of 11 June 2024

Carlos Roberto Bernárdez García (born 28 December 1992) is a Belizean footballer who plays as a forward for Honduran club Platense FC and the Belize national team.

== Early life ==
Bernárdez comes from a Honduran family, but he was born in Belize while his parents were en route to the United States. At eight months old, his mother left him in Olanchito, the town where his family lived.

== International career ==
As Bernárdez was raised in Honduras and identifies himself as a Honduran, his intention was to play for the Honduras national team. He ultimately accepted a call-up to represent Belize in 2019, and made his debut on 30 August 2019 in a friendly against Saint Vincent and the Grenadines.

== Career statistics ==
=== International goals ===
Scores and results list Belize's goal tally first.

No.	Date	Venue	Cap	Opponent	Score	Result	Competition
1.	30 March 2021	Estadio Panamericano, San Cristóbal, Dominican Republic	6	Turks and Caicos Islands	1–0	5–0	2022 FIFA World Cup qualification
2.	30 March 2021	Estadio Panamericano, San Cristóbal, Dominican Republic	6	Turks and Caicos Islands	3–0	5–0	2022 FIFA World Cup qualification
3.	21 March 2024	FFB Stadium, Belmopan, Belize	14	Puerto Rico	1–0	1–1	Friendly
4.	11 June 2024	Wildey Turf, Wildey, Barbados	16	Guyana	1–3	1–3	2026 FIFA World Cup qualification
5.	14 November 2024	FFB Stadium, Belmopan, Belize		French Guiana	1–0	2–1	2024–25 CONCACAF Nations League Play-in
6.	19 November 2024	Dr. Ir. Franklin Essed Stadion, Paramaribo, Suriname		French Guiana	2–1	2–2	2024–25 CONCACAF Nations League Play-in
7.	25 March 2025	Estadio Nacional, San José, Costa Rica		Costa Rica	1–4	1–6	2025 CONCACAF Gold Cup qualification
