= Jack Jean-Baptiste =

Honduran footballer (born 1999)

Personal information
- Full name: Jack Eduardo Jean-Baptiste Cruz
- Date of birth: 20 December 1999 (age 26)
- Place of birth: San Pedro Sula, Honduras
- Height: 1.90 m (6 ft 3 in)
- Position: Midfielder

Team information
- Current team: C.D. Olimpia
- Number: 15

Senior career*
Years	Team	Apps	(Gls)
2018–2019	Motagua	13	(0)
2019	→ Loudoun United (loan)	6	(0)
2020–2021	Real de Minas	29	(0)
2021–2022	Lobos UPNFM	50	(4)
2023–	C.D. Olimpia	4	(0)
2023	Lobos UPNFM (loan)		
- * Club domestic league appearances and goals as of 22 May 2021

Jack Eduardo Jean-Baptiste Cruz (born 20 December 1999) is a Honduran professional footballer who plays as a defensive midfielder for C.D. Olimpia.

== Career ==
The midfielder was promoted to the first team after playing on the Motague U-19 team in January 2018. Baptiste joined Loudoun United on loan for the rest of 2019.

== International career ==
Jean-Baptiste was born in Honduras to a Haitian father and Honduran mother.
