= Gabriel Araújo (footballer) =

Brazilian footballer (born 1992)

Personal information
- Full name: Gabriel Araújo Carvalho
- Date of birth: January 29, 1992 (age 34)
- Place of birth: Salvador, Brazil
- Height: 1.84 m (6 ft 0 in)
- Position: Left back

Team information
- Current team: CD Olimpia
- Number: 12

Youth career
- 2006–2009: Cruzeiro

Senior career*
Years	Team	Apps	(Gls)
2010–2014	Cruzeiro	5	(0)
2012	→ Nacional (loan)	3	(0)
2012	→ Vitória (loan)	0	(0)
2013	→ Madureira (loan)	12	(1)
2013–2014	→ Macaé (loan)	9	(0)
2014–2015	Metalurh Donetsk	14	(0)
2015–2016	Stal Dniprodzerzhynsk	0	(0)
2017	Ypiranga	6	(1)
2018–2019	Náutico	0	(0)
2020	Penapolense	12	(0)
2020–2021	São Luiz	31	(1)
2021	Botafogo FC	21	(0)
2021–2022	Grêmio	27	(0)
2022–	CD Olimpia	42	(4)
- * Club domestic league appearances and goals as of 03:13, 15 February 2024 (UTC)

Gabriel Araújo Carvalho (born January 29, 1992), known as Gabriel Araújo, is a Brazilian professional footballer who plays as a left back for Olimpia.

== Career ==
=== Cruzeiro ===
He made his professional debut for Cruzeiro in a 2–4 away draw to Figueirense in the Campeonato Brasileiro Série A on 1 September 2011.

=== Nacional EC MG ===
Gabriel made his league debut for Nacional against Tupi on 4 February 2012.

=== Vitória ===
In June 2012, he was transferred to Vitória.

=== Madureira ===
Gabriel made his league debut for Madureira against Resende on 19 January 2013. He scored his first league goal for the club against Friburguense on the 13 April 2013, scoring in the 59th minute.

=== Macaé ===
Gabriel made his league debut for Macaé against Madureira on 12 June 2013.

=== Metalurh Donetsk ===
Gabriel made his league debut for Metalurh Donetsk against Hoverla on 8 November 2014.

=== Stal Dniprodzerzhynsk ===
He played for Ukrainian club Stal Dniprodzerzhynsk in Ukrainian Premier League.

=== Ypiranga RS ===
Gabriel made his league debut for Ypiranga RS against Grêmio on 2 February 2017. He scored his first goal for the club against Volta Redonda on the 20 August 2017, scoring in extra time.

=== Náutico ===
Gabriel made his league debut for Náutico against Itabaiana on 8 January 2018.

=== Penapolense ===
Gabriel made his league debut for Penapolense against São Caetano on 22 January 2020.

=== São Luiz ===
Gabriel made his league debut for São Luiz against SÃo JosÉ RS on the 23 July 2020. He scored his first goal for the club against Novo Hamburgo on 14 March 2021, scoring in the 49th minute.

=== Botafogo PB ===
Gabriel made his league debut for Botafogo PB against Paysandu Sport Club on 8 June 2021.

=== Brasil de Pelotas ===
Gabriel made his league debut for Brasil de Pelotas against Aimoré on 27 January 2022.

=== CD Olimpia ===
On August 19, 2022, he signed for Honduran club CD Olimpia. Gabriel made his league debut for Olimpia against Real Sociedad on 11 September 2022. He scored his first league goal for the club against Motagua on 7 November 2022, scoring in the 52nd minute.

== Honours ==
Náutico

- Pernambucano 1: 2018

CD Olimpia

- Liga Nacional: 2022, 2023
