= Javier Estupiñán =

Colombian footballer (born 1984)

Personal information
- Full name: Javier Enrique Estupiñán Romero
- Date of birth: 8 February 1984 (age 42)
- Place of birth: Santa Bárbara, Colombia
- Height: 1.90 m (6 ft 3 in)
- Position: Forward

Team information
- Current team: Juticalpa

Senior career*
Years	Team	Apps	(Gls)
2004–2005	Deportivo Pasto		
2005–2006	Girardot		
2006–2007	Deportivo Pasto		
2007–2008	Independiente José Terán		
2008–2009	Patriotas Boyacá		
2009–2010	Atlético Nacional	4	(0)
2010–2011	Deportivo Pasto	15	(2)
2011	Chengdu Tiancheng	16	(2)
2012–2013	Patriotas Boyacá	13	(1)
2013–2014	Platense	24	(14)
2014	Parrillas One	15	(8)
2014	Terengganu	21	(13)
2015–2017	Olimpia	73	(30)
2018	Motagua	34	(7)
2019–	Juticalpa		
- * Club domestic league appearances and goals as of 16 December 2018

Javier Andrés Estupiñán Romero (Spanish pronunciation: [xaˈβjeɾ estupiˈɲan]; born 8 February 1984) is a Colombian footballer who plays as a forward for Honduran Liga Nacional club Juticalpa

== Career ==
=== Early career ===
Estupiñan began his playing career in 2004 playing for Deportivo Pasto. In Deportivo Pasto he did not have much involvement and in the year 2005 he left the club, when he was loaned to Girardot F.C.

=== Honduras ===
He arrived in Honduras to play for Platense F.C. At Platense he scored 14 goals. After a few seasons he moved to Parrillas One where he continued to score goals.

=== Terengganu FA ===
He arrived in Terengganu F.C. I with a high expectation from the fans. But he only scored 2 goals from 5 appearances in the Malaysia Super League. He has been transfer after a bad season in Terengganu FA

He returned to Honduras ahead of the 2015 Clausura championship when he joined Club Deportivo Olimpia. In 2018 he signed for city rivals F.C. Motagua.
