= Roberto Moreira (footballer, born 1987) =

Paraguayan footballer (born 1987)

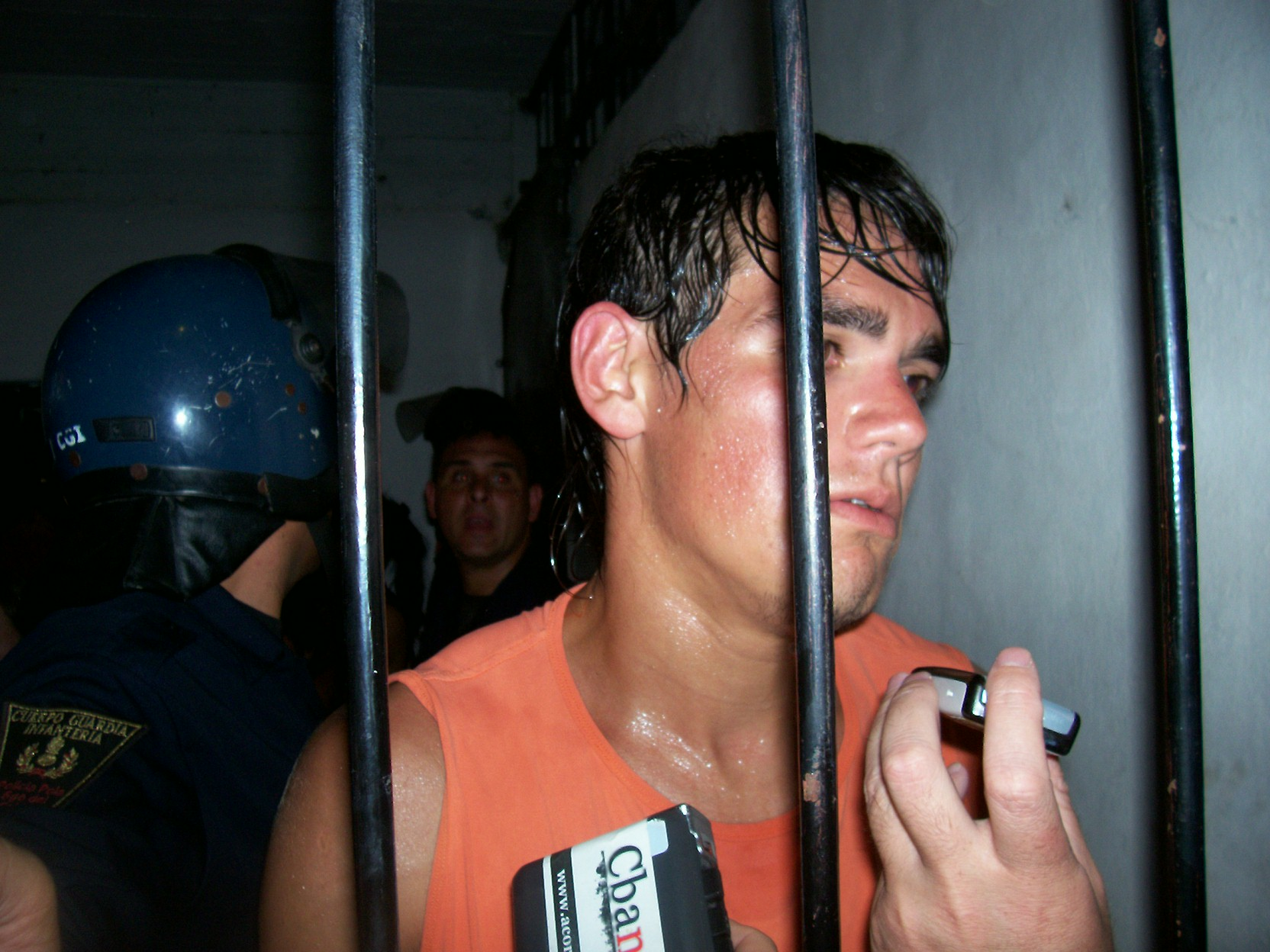

Personal information
- Full name: Roberto Ramón Moreira Aldana
- Date of birth: 6 May 1987 (age 39)
- Place of birth: Luque, Paraguay
- Height: 1.83 m (6 ft 0 in)
- Position: Forward

Team information
- Current team: Motagua
- Number: 21

Senior career*
Years	Team	Apps	(Gls)
2006–2009	Talleres de Córdoba	38	(7)
2009–2010	Rangers	15	(3)
2011	Armenio	19	(0)
2012	Comunicaciones	13	(2)
2012–2017	Estudiantes	180	(51)
2017–2018	Ferro Carril Oeste	13	(0)
2018–	Motagua	110	(50)
- * Club domestic league appearances and goals as of 19 May 2021

Roberto Ramón Moreira Aldana (born 6 May 1987) is a Paraguayan professional footballer who plays as a forward for Liga Nacional club Motagua.

== Career ==
Moreira made his debut in Argentina with Talleres de Córdoba in 2006 at the age of 18 playing against Defensa y Justicia. After Talleres' relegation in 2009, he signed for Chilean side Rangers de Talca. He returned to Argentina in 2011 to play for Deportivo Armenio, Club Comunicaciones, Club Sportivo Estudiantes and Ferro Carril Oeste. He was crowned champions with Estudiantes in 2014 gaining promotion to Primera B Nacional. In 2018, he signed for Honduran club F.C. Motagua.

== Achievements ==
=== Estudiantes ===
- Torneo Argentino B: 2013
- Torneo Federal A: 2014

=== Motagua ===
- Liga Nacional: 2018–19 A, 2018–19 C
