= Carlos Sánchez (footballer, born 1990) =

Honduran footballer

Personal information
- Full name: Carlos Alfredo Sánchez Sánchez
- Date of birth: 22 August 1990 (age 36)
- Place of birth: El Progreso, Honduras
- Height: 1.79 m (5 ft 10 in)
- Position: Defender

Team information
- Current team: C.D. Olimpia

Youth career
- 2008: Platense Júnior

Senior career*
Years	Team	Apps	(Gls)
2009–2010	Platense		
2011–2012	Marathón	7	(1)
2012–2014	Honduras Progreso	18	(1)
2015	Real España	12	(0)
2015–2018	Honduras Progreso	67	(8)
2018–2019	Motagua	14	(0)
2020–2022	C.D.S. Vida		

International career^{‡}
2015–2018	Honduras	6	(0)
- * Club domestic league appearances and goals as of 8 December 2019 ‡ National team caps and goals as of 3 June 2018

Carlos Sánchez (born 22 August 1990) is a Honduran professional footballer who plays as a defender for Honduran club C.D. Olimpia and the Honduras national team. He has won one league title with C.D. Honduras Progreso.

== Honduras national team ==
Sánchez was called to take part in the 2017 CONCACAF Gold Cup

== Honours and achievements ==
=== Honduras Progreso ===
- Liga Nacional:
  - Winners (1): 2015–16 A
  - Runners-up (1): 2016–17 C

=== Motagua ===
- Liga Nacional:
  - Winners (2): 2018–19 A, 2018–19 C
- CONCACAF League
  - Runners-up (1): 2018
