= 2019–20 F.C. Motagua season =

Motagua
2019–20 season
- Chairman: Eduardo Atala
- Manager: Diego Vásquez
- Stadium: Nacional
- Apertura: Final 5 Round
- Clausura: 1st
- Honduran Cup: Not held
- CONCACAF League: Runners-up
- CONCACAF Champions League: Round of 16
- Top goalscorer: League: Moreira (15); All: Moreira (17)
Home colours	Away colours	Third colours
- All statistics correct as of 29 April 2020.

The 2019–20 season is F.C. Motagua's 73rd season in existence and the club's 54th consecutive season in the top fight of Honduran football. In addition to the domestic league, the club will also compete for the 2019 Honduran Cup, the 2019 CONCACAF League. and the 2020 CONCACAF Champions League.

== Overview ==
Coach Diego Vásquez renewed his contract, he will be leading the team for his 12th consecutive tournament. Vásquez reached 240+ consecutive games as Motagua's manager, a club's and league record. In August 2019, the club announced the re-signing of defender Emilio Izaguirre, who returned to Motagua almost a decade later after his successful venture at Celtic F.C. On 25 September 2019, the club officially qualified to the 2020 CONCACAF Champions League through their participation at the 2019 CONCACAF League. On 31 October, Motagua qualified to their 2nd straight CONCACAF League final after defeating Alianza F.C. with a 4–1 aggregated score. However, in the final series, they weren't able to conquer the tournament as they lost to Deportivo Saprissa with a 0–1 aggregate score. In the Apertura tournament, Motagua was able to qualify to the Final 5 Stage (Pentagonal), however felt short against C.D. Olimpia and failed to qualify to their seventh straight final series.

In the second semester of the season, F.C. Motagua faced Atlanta United FC in the Round of 16 at the 2020 CONCACAF Champions League, where they couldn't advance after falling 1–4 on aggregated score.

== Kits ==
The 2019–20 home, away and third kits were published on 27 June. On 1 October, the club released an all-pink jersey to support breast cancer awareness.

Manufacturer		Main sponsor	
Joma		Pepsi	
Home	Away	Alternative	Goalkeeper

== Players ==
=== Transfers in ===
Player	Contract date	Moving from
(Honduras) Óscar Salas	27 June 2019	(Honduras) Juticalpa
(Honduras) Jack Baptiste	24 July 2019	(United States) Loudoun United
(Honduras) Félix Crisanto	26 July 2019	(Mexico) BUAP
(Honduras) Henry Ayala	8 August 2019	(Honduras) Juticalpa
(Honduras) Emilio Izaguirre	9 August 2019	(Scotland) Celtic
(Honduras) Josué Villafranca	23 December 2019	(Honduras) Vida
(Honduras) Marcelo Canales	4 January 2020	(Honduras) Vida
(Argentina) Gonzalo Klusener	11 January 2020	(Argentina) Independiente Rivadavia
(Honduras) Wesly Decas	20 January 2020	(United States) Atlanta United 2
(Honduras) Rubilio Castillo	30 January 2020	(Portugal) Tondela

=== Transfers out ===
Player	Released date	Moving to
(Honduras) Harrinson Bernárdez	15 July 2019	(Honduras) Real de Minas
(Honduras) Éverson López	15 July 2019	(Honduras) Real de Minas
(Honduras) Josué Villafranca	28 July 2019	(Honduras) Vida
(Argentina) Marcelo Estigarribia	17 December 2019	(Argentina) Belgrano
(Honduras) Óscar Salas	19 December 2019	(Honduras) Vida
(Honduras) Henry Ayala	19 December 2019	(Honduras) Platense
(Honduras) Carlos Sánchez	19 December 2019	(Honduras) Vida
(Honduras) Jack Baptiste	6 January 2020	(Honduras) Real de Minas
(Honduras) César Romero	6 January 2020	(Honduras) Real de Minas
(Honduras) Denil Maldonado	17 January 2020	(Mexico) Pachuca

=== Squad ===
- Statistics as of 14 March 2020
- Only league matches into account

No.	Pos.	Player name	Date of birth and age	Games played			Goals scored		
				< 18/19	19/20	Total	< 18/19	19/20	Total
1	GK	(Honduras) Hugo Caballero	5 January 1997 (aged 22)	0	0	0	0	0	0
2	DF	(Honduras) Juan Montes	26 October 1985 (aged 33)	216	24	240	12	2	14
3	DF	(Honduras) Emilio Izaguirre	10 May 1986 (aged 33)	143	17	160	4	1	5
4	MF	(Honduras) Sergio Peña	9 May 1987 (aged 32)	23	27	50	1	2	3
5	DF	(Honduras) Marcelo Pereira	27 May 1995 (aged 24)	94	28	122	8	1	9
6	MF	(Honduras) Reinieri Mayorquín	13 July 1989 (aged 29)	182	19	201	10	2	12
7	MF	(Honduras) Erick Andino	21 July 1989 (aged 29)	125	2	127	34	0	34
8	MF	(Honduras) Walter Martínez	26 March 1991 (aged 28)	72	31	103	9	0	9
9	FW	(Argentina) Gonzalo Klusener	21 October 1983 (aged 35)	0	11	11	0	4	4
10	MF	(Argentina) Matías Galvaliz	6 June 1989 (aged 30)	35	26	61	2	4	6
11	FW	(Honduras) Marco Vega	14 April 1987 (aged 32)	93	19	112	16	4	20
12	MF	(Honduras) Raúl Santos	2 August 1992 (aged 26)	57	17	74	0	0	0
14	DF	(Honduras) Klifox Bernárdez	14 May 1997 (aged 22)	44	3	47	0	0	0
15	MF	(Honduras) Juan Gómez	3 April 2000 (aged 19)	0	2	2	0	0	0
16	MF	(Honduras) Héctor Castellanos	28 December 1992 (aged 26)	141	17	158	1	0	1
17	MF	(Honduras) Denil Maldonado	25 May 1998 (aged 21)	49	11	60	1	1	2
17	DF	(Honduras) Wesly Decas	11 August 1999 (aged 19)	0	3	3	0	0	0
18	DF	(Honduras) Wilmer Crisanto	24 June 1989 (aged 30)	199	23	222	18	1	19
19	GK	(Argentina) Jonathan Rougier	29 October 1987 (aged 31)	92	26	118	0	0	0
21	FW	(Paraguay) Roberto Moreira	6 May 1987 (aged 32)	44	30	74	21	15	36
22	FW	(Argentina) Marcelo Estigarribia	10 April 1995 (aged 24)	18	20	38	7	7	14
23	MF	(Honduras) Jack Baptiste	20 December 1999 (aged 19)	10	3	13	0	0	0
24	DF	(Honduras) Omar Elvir	28 September 1989 (aged 29)	255	21	276	10	0	10
25	GK	(Honduras) Marlon Licona	9 February 1991 (aged 28)	79	9	88	0	0	0
26	MF	(Honduras) Óscar Salas	8 December 1993 (aged 25)	0	10	10	0	0	0
26	FW	(Honduras) Josué Villafranca	16 December 1999 (aged 19)	6	2	8	1	0	1
27	DF	(Honduras) Félix Crisanto	9 September 1990 (aged 28)	99	24	123	5	2	7
28	MF	(Honduras) Ángel Barrios	27 October 2000 (aged 18)	1	0	1	0	0	0
29	FW	(Honduras) Rubilio Castillo	26 November 1991 (aged 27)	154	7	161	84	5	89
30	DF	(Honduras) Henry Ayala	31 January 1996 (aged 23)	0	1	1	0	0	0
31	MF	(Honduras) Carlos Sánchez	22 August 1990 (aged 28)	12	3	15	0	0	0
31	MF	(Honduras) Marcelo Canales	6 January 1991 (aged 28)	0	3	3	0	0	0
32	MF	(Honduras) Jonathan Núñez	26 November 2001 (aged 17)	2	5	7	0	0	0
33	DF	(Honduras) Albert Galindo	21 October 2001 (aged 17)	0	1	1	0	0	0
34	FW	(Honduras) Kevin López	3 February 1996 (aged 23)	126	30	156	22	7	29
35	DF	(Honduras) Cristopher Meléndez	25 November 1997 (aged 21)	24	14	38	0	0	0
Manager		(Argentina) Diego Vásquez	3 July 1971 (aged 47)	23 November 2013–					

=== Goalkeeper's action ===
- As of 14 March 2020

Goalkeeper	Years evaluated	Games	Goals	Per.
(Argentina) Jonathan Rougier	2017–present	118	112	0.949
(Honduras) Marlon Licona	2010–2017, 2018–present	88	99	1.125

=== International caps ===
- As of 17 November 2019

This is a list of players that were playing for Motagua during the 2019–20 season and were called to represent Honduras at different international competitions.

Player	Team	Event	Caps	Goals
Félix Crisanto	Adult	2019–20 CONCACAF Nations League	3	0
Félix Crisanto	Adult	Friendlies v Puerto Rico and Chile	2	0
Marcelo Pereira	Adult	2019–20 CONCACAF Nations League	1	0
Marcelo Pereira	Adult	Friendlies v Puerto Rico and Chile	2	0
Emilio Izaguirre	Adult	2019–20 CONCACAF Nations League	2	0
Emilio Izaguirre	Adult	Friendlies v Puerto Rico and Chile	1	1
Kevin López	Adult	2019–20 CONCACAF Nations League	0	0
Kevin López	Adult	Friendlies v Puerto Rico and Chile	1	0
Raúl Santos	Adult	2019–20 CONCACAF Nations League	0	0
Héctor Castellanos	Adult	2019–20 CONCACAF Nations League	1	0
Denil Maldonado	Adult	2019–20 CONCACAF Nations League	2	0
Denil Maldonado	Adult	Friendlies v Puerto Rico and Chile	2	0
Denil Maldonado	Under-23	2019 CONCACAF Men's Olympic Qualifying Championship	2	0
Denil Maldonado	Under-23	2019 Pan American Games	5	1
Cristopher Meléndez	Under-23	2019 CONCACAF Men's Olympic Qualifying Championship	2	0
Cristopher Meléndez	Under-23	2019 Pan American Games	1	0

== Results ==
All times are local CST unless stated otherwise

=== Preseason and friendlies ===
6 July 2019 Friendly	Platense	2–0	Motagua	Puerto Cortés
16:00	Volpi 66' (pen.); Velásquez 88'			Stadium: Estadio Excélsior; Referee: Starting XI: 19 – Rougier; 2 – Montes; 4 – Peña; 5 – Pereira; 7 – Andino; 11 – Vega; 14 – Bernárdez; 16 – Castellanos; 21 – Moreira; 24 – Elvir; 34 – López
Note: Midfielder Óscar Salas made his debut for the club.

7 July 2019 Friendly	Motagua (Honduras)	2–0	(Costa Rica) San Carlos	Comayagua, Honduras
16:00	Martínez 19'; Moreira 65'			Stadium: Estadio Carlos Miranda; Referee: Starting XI: 19 – Rougier (substituted off) 73'; 2 – Montes; 4 – Mayorquín; 5 – Pereira; 8 – Martínez (substituted off) 71'; 10 – Andino (substituted off) 60'; 12 – Moreira; 14 – Crisanto; 16 – Castellanos (substituted off) 73'; 24 – Elvir; 34 – López; Substitutes; 11 – Vega (substituted on) 60'; – Salas (substituted on) 71'; – Peña (substituted on) 73'; 25 – Licona (substituted on) 73'
Note: It was the first ever match between these two clubs. F.C. Motagua won the "Copa de Campeones" (Champions Cup).

11 July 2019 Friendly	Promesas	0–8	Motagua	San Juan Pueblo
15:00				Stadium: Estadio Carlos Calderón

13 July 2019 Friendly	Hermanos Arriola	1–7	Motagua	Mezapa
	Mejía	Report	Vega; Moreira; Andino; Estigarribia; Crisanto; Salas	Stadium: Cancha Santa Rosa; Attendance: ~500

19 July 2019 Friendly	Motagua (Honduras)	2–1	(El Salvador) Municipal Limeño	Houston, United States
20:30	Estigarribia 55' 76'		81' Galeas	Stadium: W.W. Thorne Stadium

21 July 2019 Friendly	Motagua (Honduras)	1–2	(El Salvador) Municipal Limeño	New Orleans, United States
	Pereira 90+1'		Galeas; Oviedo	Stadium: Tad Gormley Stadium

28 December 2019 Friendly	Panamericano	0–3	Motagua	Nacaome
16:00			Vega; Martínez; Villafranca	Stadium: Estadio José Elías Názar
Note: C.D. Panamericano plays in the Honduran Liga Mayor. All funds collected from the attendance were donated to some local churches.

4 January 2020 Friendly	Comayagua XI	0–9	Motagua	Comayagua
16:00			Moreira; Vega; Villafranca; Pereira; Izaguirre; López	Stadium: Estadio Carlos Miranda

=== Apertura ===
28 July 2019 Week 1	Motagua	2–1	Platense	Tegucigalpa
16:00	López 22' 28'	Report	72' Volpi	Stadium: Estadio Tiburcio Carías Andino; Attendance: 5,026; Referee: Melvin Matamoros Starting XI: 19 – Rougier; 2 – Montes; 5 – Pereira; 6 – Mayorquín; 8 – Martínez (substituted off) 71'; 16 – Castellanos; 18 – W. Crisanto (substituted off) 67'; 21 – Moreira; 22 – Estigarribia (substituted off) 78'; 24 – Elvir; 34 – López; Substitutes; 27 – F. Crisanto (substituted on) 67'; 26 – Salas (substituted on) 71'; 11 – Vega (substituted on) 78'
Note: Midfielder Óscar Salas made his official debut with the club. Defender Félix Crisanto reached 100 appearances with F.C. Motagua in his loan return from Lobos BUAP. Meanwhile, his cousin Wilmer Crisanto reached 200 appearances with the club.

4 August 2019 Week 2	Real España	1–0	Motagua	San Pedro Sula
17:00	Charles 90+10'	Report		Stadium: Estadio Olímpico Metropolitano; Attendance: Closed gates Referee: Nelson Salgado Starting XI: 19 – Rougier; 2 – Montes; 5 – Pereira; 6 – Mayorquín; 8 – Martínez (substituted off) 66'; 16 – Castellanos (substituted off) 44'; 18 – W. Crisanto; 21 – Moreira; 22 – Estigarribia (substituted off) 76'; 24 – Elvir; 34 – López; Substitutes; 4 – Peña (substituted on) 44'; 7 – Andino (substituted on) 66'; 27 – F. Crisanto (substituted on) 76'
Note: Due to a 3-game ban to Real C.D. España, the game was played behind closed doors. F.C. Motagua finished the game with nine players after Juan Montes was ejected and Erick Andino suffered a severe injury.

11 August 2019 Week 3	Motagua	2–1	Real Sociedad	Tegucigalpa
16:00	Galvaliz 56'; Moreira 78'	Report	27' Móvil	Stadium: Estadio Tiburcio Carías Andino; Referee: Ángel Cruz Starting XI: 19 – Rougier; 4 – Peña; 5 – Pereira; 6 – Mayorquín (substituted off) 46'; 10 – Galvaliz; 21 – Moreira; 22 – Estigarribia (substituted off) 75'; 24 – Elvir (substituted off) 11'; 27 – Crisanto; 33 – Galindo; 34 – López; Substitutes; 3 – Izaguirre (substituted on) 11'; 8 – Martínez (substituted on) 46'; 11 – Vega (substituted on) 75'
Note: Defender Emilio Izaguirre returned to F.C. Motagua after almost a ten-year career in Europe. Meanwhile, youngster Albert Galindo made his official debut for the club.

14 August 2019 Week 4	Real de Minas	4–4	Motagua	Danlí
15:30	Mejía 47' 49' 71' 79'	Report	22' Pereira; 35' López; 45' 90+1' Moreira	Stadium: Estadio Marcelo Tinoco; Referee: Raúl Castro Starting XI: 19 – Rougier; 2 – Montes; 3 – Izaguirre; 4 – Peña; 5 – Pereira; 6 – Mayorquín (substituted off) 68'; 10 – Galvaliz; 21 – Moreira; 22 – Estigarribia (substituted off) 62'; 27 – Crisanto; 34 – López; Substitutes; 8 – Martínez (substituted on) 62'; 35 – Meléndez (substituted on) 68'
Note: F.C. Motagua wasted a first half three goal advantage.

3 November 2019 Week 5	Olimpia	2–0	Motagua	San Pedro Sula
17:00	Bengoché 46' 55'	Report		Stadium: Estadio Olímpico Metropolitano; Attendance: 8,438; Referee: Saíd Martínez Starting XI: 25 – Licona; 5 – Pereira; 6 – Mayorquín; 8 – Martínez (substituted off) 65'; 12 – Santos; 14 – Bernárdez (substituted off) 51'; 16 – Castellanos; 18 – W. Crisanto (substituted off) 55'; 21 – Moreira; 27 – F. Crisanto; 35 – Meléndez; Substitutes; 22 – Estigarribia (substituted on) 51'; 34 – López (substituted on) 55'; 26 – Salas (substituted on) 65'
Note: This game was scheduled to be played on 17 August, but due to the riots caused by the fans inside and outside the stadium, the game was played on November 3rd. C.D. Olimpia as home club, opted to move the game to San Pedro Sula. It was the first derby at this city since 17 December 2006.

24 August 2019 Week 6	Motagua	3–1	Vida	Comayagua
19:00	Peña 58' 82'; Maldonado 74'	Report	87' Rivera	Stadium: Estadio Carlos Miranda; Attendance: Closed gates Referee: Luís Mejía Starting XI: 25 – Licona; 2 – Montes; 3 – Izaguirre; 6 – Mayorquín; 11 – Vega; 14 – Bernárdez; 17 – Maldonado; 18 – Crisanto (substituted off) 80'; 22 – Estigarribia (substituted off) 46'; 26 – Salas (substituted off) 46'; 35 – Meléndez; Substitutes; 8 – Martínez (substituted on) 46'; 4 – Peña (substituted on) 46'; 27 – F. Crisanto (substituted on) 80'
Note: This game was moved to Comayagua and was played behind closed doors due to the incidents occurred on week 5 where four fans were killed.

1 September 2019 Week 7	Motagua	1–0	Marathón	Juticalpa
16:00	Crisanto 8'	Report		Stadium: Estadio Juan Ramón Brevé Vargas; Referee: Raúl Castro Starting XI: 19 – Rougier; 2 – Montes; 4 – Peña; 5 – Pereira; 6 – Mayorquín; 10 – Galvaliz (substituted off) 64'; 11 – Vega (substituted off) 44'; 17 – Maldonado; 21 – Moreira; 27 – Crisanto; 34 – López (substituted off) 85'; Substitutes; 22 – Estigarribia (substituted on) 44'; 8 – Martínez (substituted on) 64'; 35 – Meléndez (substituted on) 85'
Note: This was the second home game played outside Tegucigalpa due to the ban at Estadio Tiburcio Carías Andino. Defender Félix Crisanto scored his first goal for F.C. Motagua since 9 April 2017.

12 September 2019 Week 8	Honduras Progreso	0–1	Motagua	El Progreso
19:00		Report	50' (pen.) Moreira	Stadium: Estadio Humberto Micheletti; Referee: Armando Castro Starting XI: 19 – Rougier; 2 – Montes; 4 – Peña; 8 – Martínez (substituted off) 68'; 10 – Galvaliz (substituted off) 88'; 18 – Crisanto; 21 – Moreira; 22 – Estigarribia; 24 – Elvir; 26 – Salas (substituted off) 62'; 35 – Meléndez; Substitutes; 23 – Baptiste (substituted on) 62'; 5 – Pereira (substituted on) 68'; 34 – López (substituted on) 88'
Note: F.C. Motagua obtained their first away victory of the season. Defender Marcelo Pereira reached his 100th appearance for the club. Youngster Jack Baptiste reappeared since February 2019 after his loan return from Loudoun United FC.

15 September 2019 Week 9	UPNFM	0–1	Motagua	Choluteca
17:00		Report	87' Estigarribia	Stadium: Estadio Emilio Williams Agasse; Referee: Saíd Martínez Starting XI: 19 – Rougier; 2 – Montes; 4 – Peña; 5 – Pereira; 6 – Mayorquín; 10 – Galvaliz (substituted off) 65'; 17 – Maldonado; 21 – Moreira (substituted off) 78'; 22 – Estigarribia; 24 – Elvir; 34 – López (substituted off) 58'; Substitutes; 27 – Crisanto (substituted on) 58'; 8 – Martínez (substituted on) 65'; 26 – Salas (substituted on) 78'
Note: Forward Marcelo Estigarribia scored his first goal of the season in a game which was played under an electrical storm most of the second half. With the win, F.C. Motagua reached the top of the standings.

18 September 2019 Week 10	Motagua	2–1	Honduras Progreso	Tegucigalpa
19:00	Moreira 7' (pen.); Izaguirre 34'	Report	72' Britto	Stadium: Estadio Tiburcio Carías Andino; Referee: Jonfy Vallecillo Starting XI: 19 – Rougier; 2 – Montes; 3 – Izaguirre; 4 – Peña; 5 – Pereira; 10 – Galvaliz (substituted off) 64'; 17 – Maldonado; 21 – Moreira (substituted off) 71'; 22 – Estigarribia; 23 – Baptiste; 27 – F. Crisanto (substituted off) 58'; Substitutes; 34 – López (substituted on) 58'; 8 – Martínez (substituted on) 64'; 18 – W. Crisanto (substituted on) 71'
Note: Defender Emilio Izaguirre scored his first goal for F.C. Motagua since 25 October 2009.

22 September 2019 Week 11	Motagua	3–1	UPNFM	Tegucigalpa
16:00	Galvaliz 18'; Estigarribia 43'; López 57'	Report	62' (pen.) Güity	Stadium: Estadio Tiburcio Carías Andino; Referee: Armando Castro Starting XI: 25 – Licona; 2 – Montes; 4 – Peña; 6 – Mayorquín; 10 – Galvaliz (substituted off) 70'; 17 – Maldonado; 21 – Moreira; 22 – Estigarribia (substituted off) 65'; 24 – Elvir; 34 – López (substituted off) 79'; 35 – Meléndez; Substitutes; 5 – Pereira (substituted on) 65'; 8 – Martínez (substituted on) 70'; 18 – Crisanto (substituted on) 79'
Note: F.C. Motagua obtained its 6th straight win for the first time since November 2018.

28 September 2019 Week 12	Marathón	2–1	Motagua	San Pedro Sula
16:00	Martínez 6'; Arriaga 85'	Report	21' Galvaliz	Stadium: Estadio Olímpico Metropolitano; Referee: Melvin Matamoros Starting XI: 19 – Rougier; 2 – Montes; 3 – Izaguirre; 4 – Peña; 5 – Pereira; 10 – Galvaliz (substituted off) 79'; 17 – Maldonado; 18 – Crisanto; 22 – Estigarribia (substituted off) 70'; 24 – Elvir; 34 – López (substituted off) 85'; Substitutes; 21 – Moreira (substituted on) 70'; 26 – Salas (substituted on) 79'; 8 – Martínez (substituted on) 85'
Note: With the loss, F.C. Motagua dropped to second position in the league standings.

6 October 2019 Week 13	Motagua	1–2	Olimpia	Comayagua
16:00	Estigarribia 45'	Report	29' Garrido; 51' Benguché	Stadium: Estadio Carlos Miranda; Referee: Óscar Moncada Starting XI: 19 – Rougier; 2 – Montes; 4 – Peña; 5 – Pereira (substituted off) 46'; 6 – Mayorquín (substituted off) 62'; 10 – Galvaliz; 17 – Maldonado; 18 – W. Crisanto (substituted off) 64'; 21 – Moreira; 22 – Estigarribia; 24 – Elvir; Substitutes; 35 – Meléndez (substituted on) 46'; 8 – Martínez (substituted on) 62'; 27 – F. Crisanto (substituted on) 64'
Note: As suggested by the National Security Department, this so considered high risk derby had to be taken outside Tegucigalpa. F.C. Motagua responded to the advice by taking the match to Comayagua. With the loss, Motagua dropped to third position.

17 October 2019 Week 14	Platense	2–3	Motagua	Puerto Cortés
19:15	Barahona 72'; Volpi 81' (pen.)	Report	55' Montes; 63' Vega; 74' Moreira	Stadium: Estadio Excélsior; Referee: Saíd Martínez Starting XI: 19 – Rougier; 2 – Montes; 4 – Peña (substituted off) 32'; 6 – Mayorquín; 8 – Martínez; 15 – Gómez (substituted off) 58'; 17 – Maldonado; 21 – Moreira; 24 – Elvir; 27 – F. Crisanto; 34 – López (substituted off) 69'; Substitutes; 3 – Izaguirre (substituted on) 32'; 11 – Vega (substituted on) 58'; 18 – W. Crisanto (substituted on) 69'
Note: F.C. Motagua returned to action after an 11-day break due to the FIFA International Match Calendar. Midfielder Juan Gómez made his official debut.

20 October 2019 Week 15	Vida	1–0	Motagua	La Ceiba
19:00	Villafranca 90+3'	Report		Stadium: Estadio Nilmo Edwards; Referee: Raúl Castro Starting XI: 25 – Licona; 2 – Montes; 3 – Izaguirre; 5 – Pereira; 8 – Martínez; 10 – Galvaliz; 11 – Vega (substituted off) 69'; 12 – Santos; 22 – Estigarribia; 23 – Baptiste (substituted off) 46'; 35 – Meléndez (substituted off) 74'; Substitutes; 27 – F. Crisanto (substituted on) 46'; 26 – Salas (substituted on) 69'; 18 – W. Crisanto (substituted on) 74'
Note: Despite the defeat, F.C. Motagua secured a spot in the postseason.

27 October 2019 Week 16	Motagua	1–1	Real España	Tegucigalpa
16:00	Estigarribia 12'	Report	20' Vuelto	Stadium: Estadio Tiburcio Carías Andino; Referee: Marlon Díaz Starting XI: 25 – Licona; 8 – Martínez (substituted off) 58'; 11 – Vega; 12 – Santos; 16 – Castellanos; 18 – W. Crisanto; 22 – Estigarribia (substituted off) 46'; 27 – F. Crisanto; 31 – Sánchez; 32 – Núñez (substituted off) 64'; 35 – Meléndez; Substitutes; 21 – Moreira (substituted on) 46'; 34 – López (substituted on) 58'; 26 – Salas (substituted on) 64'
Note: Forward Marco Vega reached 100 games playing for F.C. Motagua.

10 November 2019 Week 17	Real Sociedad	0–0	Motagua	Tocoa
14:00		Report		Stadium: Estadio Francisco Martínez Durón; Referee: Nelson Salgado Starting XI: 25 – Licona; 4 – Peña; 8 – Martínez; 11 – Vega; 12 – Santos; 18 – W. Crisanto (substituted off) 73'; 26 – Salas (substituted off) 68'; 27 – F. Crisanto; 31 – Sánchez (substituted off) 79'; 32 – Núñez; 35 – Meléndez; Substitutes; 14 – Bernárdez (substituted on) 68'; 15 – Gómez (substituted on) 73'; 30 – Ayala (substituted on) 79'
Note: This game was pushed one week later to allow time to previous postponed games. It was the first F.C. Motagua's visit to Tocoa since March 2018. Defender Henry Ayala made his official debut for the club.

20 November 2019 Week 18	Motagua	1–1	Real de Minas	Tegucigalpa
19:30	Estigarribia 25' (pen.); Crisanto (penalty missed)	Report	9' (pen.) Kabaev	Stadium: Estadio Tiburcio Carías Andino; Referee: Héctor Rodríguez Starting XI: 25 – Licona; 4 – Peña; 11 – Vega; 12 – Santos; 18 – Crisanto; 22 – Estigarribia (substituted off) 46'; 26 – Salas (substituted off) 61'; 31 – Sánchez; 32 – Núñez; 34 – López (substituted off) 46'; 35 – Meléndez; Substitutes; 10 – Galvaliz (substituted on) 46'; 21 – Moreira (substituted on) 46'; 3 – Izaguirre (substituted on) 61'
Note: F.C. Motagua finished the regular season on third position.

23 November 2019 Pentagonal	Marathón	1–2	Motagua	San Pedro Sula
15:30	Discua 1'; Arboleda (penalty missed)	Report	28' Galvaliz; 87' Vega	Stadium: Estadio Olímpico Metropolitano; Attendance: 2,716; Referee: Saíd Martínez Starting XI: 19 – Rougier; 2 – Montes; 3 – Izaguirre; 5 – Pereira; 10 – Galvaliz (substituted off) 75'; 16 – Castellanos; 17 – Maldonado; 21 – Moreira; 22 – Estigarribia (substituted off) 67'; 24 – Elvir; 27 – Crisanto (substituted off) 62'; Substitutes; 34 – López (substituted on) 62'; 11 – Vega (substituted on) 67'; 8 – Martínez (substituted on) 75'
Note: F.C. Motagua played their first Pentagonal match since 20 June 1993

30 November 2019 Pentagonal	Olimpia	2–0	Motagua	San Pedro Sula
17:00	Benguché 2'; Bengtson 52'	Report		Stadium: Estadio Olímpico Metropolitano; Attendance: 7,900; Referee: Melvin Matamoros Starting XI: 19 – Rougier; 3 – Izaguirre; 4 – Peña (substituted off) 46'; 5 – Pereira; 10 – Galvaliz; 11 – Vega (substituted off) 55'; 16 – Castellanos; 21 – Moreira; 24 – Elvir (substituted off) 25'; 27 – Crisanto; 35 – Meléndez; Substitutes; 8 – Martínez (substituted on) 25'; 34 – López (substituted on) 46'; 22 – Estigarribia (substituted on) 55'
Note: F.C. Motagua lost three consecutive Honduran Superclásicos for the first time since September 2013.

2 December 2019 Pentagonal	Motagua	5–2	Vida	Tegucigalpa
19:00	Moreira 26'; López 36'; Meléndez 57' (o.g.); Estigarribia 64'; Crisanto 88'	Report	3' Meléndez; 23' Padilla	Stadium: Estadio Tiburcio Carías Andino; Attendance: 3,885; Referee: Óscar Moncada Starting XI: 19 – Rougier; 2 – Montes; 4 – Peña; 5 – Pereira; 8 – Martínez (substituted off) 61'; 10 – Galvaliz; 17 – Maldonado (substituted off) 46'; 18 – W. Crisanto; 21 – Moreira (substituted off) 72'; 22 – Estigarribia; 34 – López; Substitutes; 27 – F. Crisanto (substituted on) 46'; 6 – Mayorquín (substituted on) 61'; 11 – Vega (substituted on) 72'
Note: This game was pushed one day further; however F.C. Motagua only had 48 hours of rest from their previous match. Winger Wilmer Crisanto scored one goal and made three assistances. Motagua reverted a 0–2 disadvantage in the 23rd minute.

8 December 2019 Pentagonal	Motagua	3–0	UPNFM	Comayagua
16:00	Estigarribia 10'; Moreira 68' (pen.) 79'	Report		Stadium: Estadio Carlos Miranda; Attendance: 3,724; Referee: Saíd Martínez Starting XI: 19 – Rougier; 2 – Montes; 3 – Izaguirre (substituted off) 46'; 4 – Peña; 5 – Pereira; 10 – Galvaliz; 12 – Santos (substituted off) 46'; 18 – W. Crisanto (substituted off) 61'; 21 – Moreira; 22 – Estigarribia; 34 – López; Substitutes; 8 – Martínez (substituted on) 46'; 27 – F. Crisanto (substituted on) 46'; 11 – Vega (substituted on) 61'
Note: F.C. Motagua was forced to move this match outside Tegucigalpa. Despite the victory, they were 3 goal difference short against C.D. Olimpia in the Pentagonal stage, thus missing their chances to qualify to their seventh straight final series.

=== Clausura ===
12 January 2020 Week 1	Platense	0–3	Motagua	Puerto Cortés
16:00		Report	30' Vega; 45' (o.g.) Ayala; 45+1' Moreira	Stadium: Estadio Excélsior; Referee: Gerson Castillo Starting XI: 19 – Rougier; 2 – Montes; 4 – Peña; 5 – Pereira; 8 – Martínez (substituted off) 73'; 10 – Galvaliz; 11 – Vega; 17 – Maldonado; 21 – Moreira (substituted off) 67'; 24 – Elvir; 34 – López (substituted off) 78'; Substitutes; 26 – Villafranca (substituted on) 67'; 12 – Santos (substituted on) 73'; 18 – Crisanto (substituted on) 78'
Note: For the third time in history, F.C. Motagua starts a tournament with an away victory at Estadio Excélsior, the first two happening in 2007 and 2016. During the second half, midfielder Wilmer Crisanto suffered racial chants from the local crowd.

19 January 2020 Week 2	Motagua	2–0	Real Sociedad	Comayagua
16:00	Montes 10'; Vega 20'	Report		Stadium: Estadio Carlos Miranda; Referee: Armando Castro Starting XI: 19 – Rougier; 2 – Montes; 4 – Peña; 5 – Pereira; 8 – Martínez (substituted off) 70'; 10 – Galvaliz (substituted off) 84'; 11 – Vega; 12 – Santos; 21 – Moreira; 24 – Elvir; 34 – López (substituted off) 74'; Substitutes; 16 – Castellanos (substituted on) 70'; 18 – Crisanto (substituted on) 74'; 31 – Canales (substituted on) 84'
Note: Due to repairs at Estadio Tiburcio Carías Andino, this game was moved to Comayagua. Midfielder Marcelo Canales made his debut with the club.

25 January 2020 Week 3	Motagua	1–1	Marathón	Danlí
15:00	Klusener 59'	Report	86' Perdomo	Stadium: Estadio Marcelo Tinoco; Referee: Melvin Matamoros Starting XI: 19 – Rougier; 2 – Montes; 4 – Peña; 5 – Pereira; 8 – Martínez (substituted off) 46'; 9 – Klusener (substituted off) 77'; 10 – Galvaliz; 21 – Moreira; 24 – Elvir; 27 – F. Crisanto; 34 – López (substituted off) 87'; Substitutes; 16 – Castellanos (substituted on) 46'; 26 – Villafranca (substituted on) 77'; 18 – W. Crisanto (substituted on) 87'
Note: Due to repairs at Estadio Tiburcio Carías Andino, this game was moved to Danlí. It was the fourth time F.C. Motagua faced C.D. Marathón at this venue, with a previous record of 1–2–0 (6:4) to Motagua. Forward Gonzalo Klusener made his official debut with the club, scoring the only goal for Motagua.

29 January 2020 Week 4	Vida	3–1	Motagua	La Ceiba
19:15	Aguilar 14'; Guillén 49'; Palma 90+5'	Report	61' Moreira	Stadium: Estadio Nilmo Edwards; Referee: Raúl Castro Starting XI: 19 – Rougier; 2 – Montes; 5 – Pereira; 8 – Martínez; 9 – Klusener; 10 – Galvaliz; 12 – Santos; 16 – Castellanos (substituted off) 46'; 18 – Crisanto (substituted off) 46'; 21 – Moreira (substituted off) 71'; 24 – Elvir; Substitutes; 34 – López (substituted on) 46'; 4 – Peña (substituted on) 46'; 11 – Vega (substituted on) 71'
Note: This represented the first F.C. Motagua's lost since 30 November 2019.

2 February 2020 Week 5	Olimpia	1–2	Motagua	San Pedro Sula
16:00	Arboleda 22'	Report	13' Moreira; 43' Klusener	Stadium: Estadio Olímpico Metropolitano; Attendance: 6,062; Referee: Melvin Matamoros Starting XI: 19 – Rougier; 2 – Montes; 5 – Pereira; 6 – Mayorquín (substituted off) 82'; 9 – Klusener (substituted off) 71'; 10 – Galvaliz; 16 – Castellanos; 21 – Moreira; 24 – Elvir; 27 – Crisanto; 34 – López (substituted off) 80'; Substitutes; 11 – Vega (substituted on) 71'; 12 – Santos (substituted on) 80'; 4 – Peña (substituted on) 82'
Note: Due to repairs at Estadio Tiburcio Carías Andino, this game was moved to San Pedro Sula, making this the fourth straight Honduran Superclásico played outside Tegucigalpa. Forward Gonzalo Klusener scored his first goal in this derby.

9 February 2020 Week 6	Motagua	5–0	Honduras Progreso	Tegucigalpa
16:00	Mayorquín 4'; Moreira 33' (pen.) 47' 63'; Castillo 73'	Report		Stadium: Estadio Tiburcio Carías Andino; Referee: Saíd Martínez Starting XI: 19 – Rougier; 2 – Montes; 5 – Pereira; 6 – Mayorquín (substituted off) 46'; 9 – Klusener (substituted off) 56'; 10 – Galvaliz (substituted off) 65'; 16 – Castellanos; 21 – Moreira; 24 – Elvir; 27 – Crisanto; 34 – López; Substitutes; 32 – Núñez (substituted on) 46'; 29 – Castillo (substituted on) 56'; 8 – Martínez (substituted on) 65'
Note: Forward Roberto Moreira scored his third hat-trick with F.C. Motagua. All-time top scorer Rubilio Castillo returned to the club after his brief passage in Europe.

12 February 2020 Week 7	UPNFM	1–3	Motagua	Choluteca
19:00	Montoya 90+4'	Report	12' Crisanto; 33' (o.g.) Montoya; 54' Castillo	Stadium: Estadio Emilio Williams Agasse; Referee: Raúl Castro Starting XI: 19 – Rougier; 2 – Montes; 3 – Izaguirre; 4 – Peña (substituted off) 71'; 5 – Pereira; 6 – Mayorquín (substituted off) 46'; 8 – Martínez; 9 – Klusener (substituted off) 67'; 27 – Crisanto; 29 – Castillo; 34 – López; Substitutes; 16 – Castellanos (substituted on) 46'; 11 – Vega (substituted on) 67'; 12 – Santos (substituted on) 71'

15 February 2020 Week 8	Motagua	1–0	Real España	Tegucigalpa
19:00	Castillo 43' (pen.)	Report		Stadium: Estadio Tiburcio Carías Andino; Referee: Armando Castro Starting XI: 19 – Rougier; 2 – Montes (substituted off) 55'; 5 – Pereira; 6 – Mayorquín (substituted off) 69'; 10 – Galvaliz; 16 – Castellanos; 21 – Moreira; 24 – Elvir; 27 – Crisanto; 29 – Castillo (substituted off) 73'; 34 – López; Substitutes; 12 – Santos (substituted on) 55'; 3 – Izaguirre (substituted on) 69'; 9 – Klusener (substituted on) 73'
Note: With the win, F.C. Motagua secured another week at the top of the standings.

22 February 2020 Week 9	Real de Minas	0–0	Motagua	Danlí
15:30		Report		Stadium: Estadio Marcelo Tinoco; Referee: Ángel Cruz Starting XI: 25 – Licona; 3 – Izaguirre; 4 – Peña; 8 – Martínez; 9 – Klusener; 11 – Vega (substituted off) 63'; 12 – Santos; 18 – Crisanto (substituted off) 63'; 31 – Canales (substituted off) 46'; 32 – Núñez; 35 – Meléndez; Substitutes; 16 – Castellanos (substituted on) 46'; 10 – Galvaliz (substituted on) 63'; 21 – Moreira (substituted on) 63'
Note: Coach Diego Vásquez sent an alternative lineup due to their upcoming match at Atlanta United FC. It was the first scoreless tie of the tournament. Midfielder Walter Martínez reached 100 appearances with the club.

1 March 2020 Week 10	Motagua	2–3	Real de Minas	Tegucigalpa
16:00	Klusener 16'; Castillo 81'	Report	26' García; 30' (pen.) Rodríguez; 79' Andino	Stadium: Estadio Tiburcio Carías Andino; Referee: Álex Morazán Starting XI: 19 – Rougier; 5 – Pereira; 6 – Mayorquín (substituted off) 46'; 9 – Klusener; 10 – Galvaliz; 12 – Santos; 16 – Castellanos; 24 – Elvir; 29 – Castillo; 34 – López (substituted off) 63'; 35 – Meléndez (substituted off) 46'; Substitutes; 21 – Moreira (substituted on) 46'; 18 – Crisanto (substituted on) 46'; 31 – Canales (substituted on) 63'

4 March 2020 Week 11	Motagua	0–0	UPNFM	Tegucigalpa
19:00		Report		Stadium: Estadio Tiburcio Carías Andino; Referee: Melvin Matamoros Starting XI: 25 – Licona; 3 – Izaguirre; 4 – Peña; 5 – Pereira; 8 – Martínez (substituted off) 75'; 10 – Galvaliz; 12 – Santos; 17 – Decas; 18 – Crisanto (substituted off) 68'; 21 – Moreira; 29 – Castillo (substituted off) 71'; Substitutes; 34 – López (substituted on) 68'; 9 – Klusener (substituted on) 71'; 7 – Andino (substituted on) 75'
Note: Youngster Wesly Decas made his official debut for the club. Forward Erick Andino reappeared after his long injury suffered back in August 2019.

7 March 2020 Week 12	Real España	0–1	Motagua	San Pedro Sula
17:30		Report	58' Klusener	Stadium: Estadio General Francisco Morazán; Referee: Raúl Castro Starting XI: 19 – Rougier; 3 – Izaguirre (substituted off) 68'; 5 – Pereira; 6 – Mayorquín (substituted off) 57'; 9 – Klusener (substituted off) 76'; 12 – Santos; 16 – Castellanos; 17 – Decas; 21 – Moreira; 24 – Elvir; 34 – López; Substitutes; 4 – Peña (substituted on) 57'; 8 – Martínez (substituted on) 68'; 29 – Castillo (substituted on) 76'
Note: Due to a musical concert, the match was played at an unusual time. Defender Reinieri Mayorquín reached 200 league appearances with the club. F.C. Motagua swept Real C.D. España in the regular season for the first time since 2009.

14 March 2020 Week 13	Motagua	4–1	Olimpia	Comayagua
15:30	Castillo 22'; Mayorquín 36'; López 59' 77'	Report	4' Bengtson	Stadium: Estadio Carlos Miranda; Attendance: Closed gates Referee: Óscar Moncada Starting XI: 19 – Rougier; 5 – Pereira; 6 – Mayorquín; 9 – Klusener (substituted off) 67'; 10 – Galvaliz (substituted off) 76'; 12 – Santos; 16 – Castellanos; 17 – Decas; 24 – Elvir (substituted off) 46'; 29 – Castillo; 34 – López; Substitutes; 3 – Izaguirre (substituted on) 46'; 8 – Martínez (substituted on) 67'; 27 – Crisanto (substituted on) 76'
Note: Due to the coronavirus pandemic, this game was played behind closed doors. Also, this became the fifth straight Honduran Superclásico played outside Tegucigalpa. With a 4–1 victory, this became the fifth time in history that F.C. Motagua defeated C.D. Olimpia by a margin of 3+ goals and the first time in Liga Nacional.

22 March 2020 Week 14	Honduras Progreso	v	Motagua	El Progreso
15:30				Stadium: Estadio Humberto Micheletti

4 April 2020 Week 15	Marathón	v	Motagua	San Pedro Sula
15:00				Stadium: Estadio Yankel Rosenthal

12 April 2020 Week 16	Motagua	v	Vida	Tegucigalpa
16:00				Stadium: Estadio Tiburcio Carías Andino

19 April 2020 Week 17	Real Sociedad	v	Motagua	Tocoa
14:00				Stadium: Estadio Francisco Martínez Durón

22 April 2020 Week 18	Motagua	v	Platense	Tegucigalpa
19:00				Stadium: Estadio Tiburcio Carías Andino

=== Honduran Cup ===
Round of 64	v	Motagua

=== CONCACAF League ===
20 August 2019 Round of 16	Managua (Nicaragua)	1–2	(Honduras) Motagua	Managua, Nicaragua
20:00	Gallego 51'	Report	19' (o.g.) Fuentes; 59' Maldonado	Stadium: Nicaragua National Football Stadium; Referee: John Pitti (PAN) Starting XI: 19 – Rougier; 2 – Montes; 4 – Peña; 5 – Pereira (substituted off) 46'; 8 – Martínez (substituted off) 58'; 10 – Galvaliz; 14 – Bernárdez; 17 – Maldonado; 21 – Moreira; 22 – Estigarribia (substituted off) 72'; 34 – López; Substitutes; 27 – Crisanto (substituted on) 46'; 6 – Mayorquín (substituted on) 58'; 11 – Vega (substituted on) 72'
Note: F.C. Motagua faced Managua FC for the first time. Denil Maldonado scored his first CONCACAF competition goal.

27 August 2019 Round of 16	Motagua (Honduras)	1–1	(Nicaragua) Managua	San Pedro Sula, Honduras
20:00	Moreira 37' (pen.)	Report	16' Peralta	Stadium: Estadio Olímpico Metropolitano; Attendance: Closed gates Referee: Ismael Cornejo (SLV) Starting XI: 19 – Rougier; 2 – Montes; 4 – Peña; 8 – Martínez; 10 – Galvaliz (substituted off) 46'; 11 – Vega; 14 – Bernárdez; 17 – Maldonado; 21 – Moreira (substituted off) 68'; 27 – F. Crisanto; 34 – López (substituted off) 78'; Substitutes; 6 – Mayorquín (substituted on) 46'; 22 – Estigarribia (substituted on) 68'; 18 – W. Crisanto (substituted on) 78'
Note: F.C. Motagua advanced to the quarterfinals thanks to a 3–2 aggregated score. Due to a ban to Estadio Tiburcio Carías Andino, CONCACAF decided to relocate the game to San Pedro Sula behind closed doors.

25 September 2019 Quarterfinals	Waterhouse (Jamaica)	0–2	(Honduras) Motagua	Kingston, Jamaica
21:00 EST		Report	65' Pereira; 71' López	Stadium: Independence Park; Referee: Reon Radix (GRN) Starting XI: 19 – Rougier; 2 – Montes; 3 – Izaguirre; 4 – Peña; 5 – Pereira; 6 – Mayorquín (substituted off) 77'; 8 – Martínez (substituted off) 74'; 17 – Maldonado; 18 – Crisanto; 21 – Moreira (substituted off) 86'; 34 – López; Substitutes; 24 – Elvir (substituted on) 74'; 23 – Baptiste (substituted on) 77'; 22 – Estigarribia (substituted on) 86'
Note: This was the first ever encounter between these two clubs, and the first F.C. Motagua's visit to this venue since August 2018. With the win, Motagua obtained the sufficient points to qualify to the 2020 CONCACAF Champions League. Defender Marcelo Pereira scored his first international goal.

2 October 2019 Quarterfinals	Motagua (Honduras)	0–0	(Jamaica) Waterhouse	San Pedro Sula, Honduras
20:00		Report		Stadium: Estadio Olímpico Metropolitano; Attendance: Closed gates Referee: Walter López (GUA) Starting XI: 19 – Rougier; 2 – Montes; 3 – Izaguirre; 4 – Peña; 6 – Mayorquín (substituted off) 85'; 10 – Galvaliz; 17 – Maldonado; 21 – Moreira; 22 – Estigarribia (substituted off) 79'; 34 – López; 35 – Meléndez (substituted off) 63'; Substitutes; 5 – Pereira (substituted on) 63'; 8 – Martínez (substituted on) 79'; 12 – Santos (substituted on) 85'
Note: With a 2–0 score on aggregate, F.C. Motagua qualified to the semifinals. Defender Raúl Santos returned from his long-lasting injury and played again since 13 March 2019.

24 October 2019 Semifinals	Alianza (El Salvador)	1–1	(Honduras) Motagua	San Salvador, El Salvador
20:00	Peñaranda 45+2'	Report	4' Montes	Stadium: Estadio Cuscatlán; Referee: José Kellys (PAN) Starting XI: 19 – Rougier; 2 – Montes; 3 – Izaguirre; 5 – Pereira; 6 – Mayorquín (substituted off) 86'; 10 – Galvaliz (substituted off) 64'; 17 – Maldonado; 21 – Moreira; 24 – Elvir; 27 – Crisanto; 34 – López (substituted off) 77'; Substitutes; 8 – Martínez (substituted on) 64'; 22 – Estigarribia (substituted on) 77'; 16 – Castellanos (substituted on) 86'
Note: It was the first official encounter between these two clubs since 3 April 1997.

31 October 2019 Semifinals	Motagua (Honduras)	3–0	(El Salvador) Alianza	San Pedro Sula, Honduras
18:00	Vega 31'; Montes 36'; Estigarribia 88'	Report		Stadium: Estadio Olímpico Metropolitano; Attendance: Closed gates Referee: Fernando Guerrero (MEX) Starting XI: 19 – Rougier; 2 – Montes; 3 – Izaguirre; 5 – Pereira; 6 – Mayorquín (substituted off) 76'; 10 – Galvaliz (substituted off) 80'; 11 – Vega (substituted off) 56'; 17 – Maldonado; 22 – Estigarribia; 24 – Elvir; 34 – López; Substitutes; 18 – Crisanto (substituted on) 56'; 16 – Castellanos (substituted on) 76'; 8 – Martínez (substituted on) 80'
Note: With a 4–1 score on aggregate, F.C. Motagua qualified to their second straight CONCACAF League final. Marco Vega and Marcelo Estigarribia scored their first ever international goal with the club.

7 November 2019 Final	Saprissa (Costa Rica)	1–0	(Honduras) Motagua	San José, Costa Rica
21:30	Venegas 19'	Report		Stadium: Estadio Ricardo Saprissa Aymá; Referee: Daneon Parchment (JAM) Starting XI: 19 – Rougier; 2 – Montes; 3 – Izaguirre; 5 – Pereira; 10 – Galvaliz (substituted off) 71'; 16 – Castellanos; 17 – Maldonado; 21 – Moreira; 22 – Estigarribia (substituted off) 81'; 24 – Elvir; 34 – López (substituted off) 46'; Substitutes; 8 – Martínez (substituted on) 46'; 27 – Crisanto (substituted on) 71'; 11 – Vega (substituted on) 81'
Note: This was a rematch between these two clubs since the 2007 UNCAF Interclub Cup finals. F.C. Motagua lost at international level again after seven games, their second longest streak.

26 November 2019 Final	Motagua (Honduras)	0–0	(Costa Rica) Saprissa	Tegucigalpa, Honduras
21:00		Report		Stadium: Estadio Tiburcio Carías Andino; Attendance: 24,040; Referee: César Ramos (MEX) Starting XI: 19 – Rougier; 2 – Montes; 3 – Izaguirre (substituted off) 63'; 5 – Pereira (substituted off) 46'; 10 – Galvaliz; 16 – Castellanos; 17 – Maldonado; 21 – Moreira; 22 – Estigarribia (substituted off) 46'; 24 – Elvir; 34 – López; Substitutes; 11 – Vega (substituted on) 46'; 27 – Crisanto (substituted on) 46'; 8 – Martínez (substituted on) 63'
Note: With a 0–1 aggregate score, F.C. Motagua lost the opportunity to lift the CONCACAF League trophy for the second straight year.

=== CONCACAF Champions League ===
18 February 2020 Round of 16	Motagua (Honduras)	1–1	(United States) Atlanta United	San Pedro Sula, Honduras
21:00	Moreira 34'	Report	35' Martínez	Stadium: Estadio Olímpico Metropolitano; Referee: Adonai Escobedo (MEX) Starting XI: 19 – Rougier; 5 – Pereira; 6 – Mayorquín (substituted off) 70'; 10 – Galvaliz (substituted off) 82'; 12 – Santos; 16 – Castellanos; 21 – Moreira; 24 – Elvir; 27 – Crisanto; 29 – Castillo (substituted off) 66'; 34 – López; Substitutes; 9 – Klusener (substituted on) 66'; 8 – Martínez (substituted on) 70'; 3 – Izaguirre (substituted on) 82'
Note: Due to repairs to the Estadio Tiburcio Carías Andino this game was moved to San Pedro Sula. Striker Roberto Moreira scored his first CONCACAF Champions League goal. It was the first ever meeting between these two clubs.

25 February 2020 Round of 16	Atlanta United (United States)	3–0	(Honduras) Motagua	Kennesaw, United States
20:00 EST	P. Martínez 40' 83'; J. Martínez 61'	Report		Stadium: Fifth Third Bank Stadium; Referee: Keylor Herrera (CRC) Starting XI: 19 – Rougier; 2 – Montes; 5 – Pereira; 6 – Mayorquín (substituted off) 68'; 10 – Galvaliz (substituted off) 58'; 12 – Santos; 16 – Castellanos; 21 – Moreira; 24 – Elvir; 27 – Crisanto (substituted off) 64'; 34 – López; Substitutes; 9 – Klusener (substituted on) 58'; 8 – Martínez (substituted on) 64'; 29 – Castillo (substituted on) 68'
Note: It was the first ever F.C. Motagua's visit to Fifth Third Bank Stadium. With a 1–4 aggregate, the club was unable to advance to the quarterfinals.

=== By round ===
Round	1	2	3	4	5	6	7	8	9	10	11	12	13	14	15	16	17	18	19	20	21	22	23	24	25	26	27	28	29	30	31	32	33	34	35	36
Ground	H	A	H	A	A	H	H	A	A	H	H	A	H	A	A	H	A	H	A	H	H	A	A	H	A	H	A	H	H	A	H	A	A	H	A	H
Result	W	L	W	D	L	W	W	W	W	W	W	L	L	W	L	D	D	D	W	W	D	L	W	W	W	W	D	L	D	W	W					
Position	3	4	3	4	3	3	3	3	2	1	1	2	3	3	3	3	3	3	3	3	3	3	3	3	3	3	3	3	3	3	3	3				

A = Away; H = Home; W = Win; D = Draw; L = Loss; P = Postponed

== Statistics ==
- As of 14 March 2020

Competition	GP	GW	GD	GL	GF	GA	GD	CS	SG	Per
League	35	20	7	8	61	36	+25	12	7	63.81%
Honduran Cup	0	0	0	0	0	0	0	0	0	0.00%
CONCACAF League	8	3	4	1	9	4	+5	4	3	54.17%
CONCACAF Champions League	2	0	1	1	1	4	–3	0	1	16.67%
Others	8	6	0	2	32	6	+26	4	1	75.00%
Totals	53	29	12	12	103	50	+53	20	12	62.26%
