= 2022–23 F.C. Motagua season =

Motagua
2022–23 season
- Chairman: Eduardo Atala
- Managers: Hernán Medina; Ninrrol Medina
- Stadium: Estadio Nacional
- Apertura: Finalist
- Clausura: Play-offs
- CONCACAF League: Semifinalist
- CONCACAF Champions League: Quarterfinalist
- Top goalscorer: League: Hernández (9); All: Hernández (11)
Home colours	Away colours	Third colours
- All statistics correct as of 7 May 2023.

The 2022–23 season was F.C. Motagua's 76th season in existence and the club's 57th consecutive season in the top fight of Honduran football. In addition to the domestic league, the club also competed in the 2022 CONCACAF League and the 2023 CONCACAF Champions League.

== Overview ==
After winning their 18th title last season, the club tried to repeat under the management of Hernán Medina. In the first semester, the club was able to reach the 2022 CONCACAF League semifinals, where they lost to hometown rivals C.D. Olimpia. In December, they reach the finals of the Apertura season, however, felt short grabbing the title. On 2 February 2023, coach Hernán Medina was sacked due to poor results. A few hours later, former defender Ninrrol Medina was appointed as new manager. In the first semester of 2023, the club qualified to the play-offs stage but was not able to reach the semifinals for the first time in 10 years after losing to C.D. Marathón.

== Kits ==
The 2022–23 home, away and third kits were published on 22 July.

Manufacturer		Main sponsor	
Joma		Pepsi	
Home	Away	Alternative	Goalkeeper

== Players ==
=== Transfers in ===
Player	Contract date	Moving from
(Honduras) Eddie Hernández	24 June 2022	(Honduras) Olimpia
(Argentina) Fabricio Brener	4 July 2022	(Greece) PAS Giannina
(Argentina) Mauro Ortiz	31 July 2022	(Argentina) Patronato
(Honduras) Kevin Álvarez	2 January 2023	(Honduras) Real España
(Honduras) Christian Gutiérrez	2 January 2023	(Honduras) Juticalpa
(Argentina) Lucas Campana	2 January 2023	(Honduras) Marathón
(Honduras) Edwin Maldonado	7 January 2023	Honduras Progreso
(Honduras) Juan Obregón	7 January 2023	(United States) Hartford Athletic
(Honduras) Giancarlos Sacaza	28 January 2023	(Honduras) Real España Reserves
(Argentina) Gaspar Triverio	29 January 2023	(Argentina) Deportivo Madryn
(Colombia) Santiago Montoya	2 February 2023	(Colombia) Deportivo Pereira

=== Transfers out ===
Player	Released date	Moving to
(Argentina) Diego Auzqui	1 June 2022	(Guatemala) Sacachispas
(Argentina) Lucas Baldunciel	8 June 2022	(Argentina) Temperley
(Argentina) Franco Olego	8 June 2022	(Argentina) Sarmiento
(Honduras) Omar Elvir	25 June 2022	(Honduras) Olancho
(Honduras) Josué Villafranca	4 July 2022	(Honduras) Victoria
(Honduras) Óscar García	20 December 2022	(Honduras) Vida
(Honduras) Hugo Caballero	20 December 2022	TBD
(Honduras) Jesse Moncada	21 December 2022	(Honduras) Vida
(Honduras) Denil Maldonado	22 December 2022	(United States) Los Angeles
(Honduras) Jason Sánchez	26 December 2022	(Honduras) UPNFM
(Honduras) Juan Gómez	26 December 2022	(Honduras) UPNFM
(Honduras) Albert Galindo	26 December 2022	Honduras Progreso
(Honduras) Ángel Tejeda	29 December 2022	(Costa Rica) Alajuelense
(Argentina) Fabricio Brener	7 January 2023	(Argentina) Nueva Chicago

=== Squad ===
As of 7 May 2023

- Only league matches into account

No.	Pos.	Player name	Date of birth and age	Games played			Goals scored		
				< 21/22	22/23	Total	< 21/22	22/23	Total
1	GK	(Honduras) Hugo Caballero	5 January 1997 (aged 25)	1	0	1	0	0	0
1	GK	(Honduras) Enrique Facussé	30 December 1998 (aged 23)	0	0	0	0	0	0
2	DF	(Honduras) Denil Maldonado	25 May 1998 (aged 24)	80	19	99	3	1	4
2	DF	(Honduras) Kevin Álvarez	3 August 1996 (aged 25)	0	6	6	0	0	0
3	DF	(Honduras) Carlos Meléndez	8 December 1997 (aged 24)	15	29	44	3	1	4
4	MF	(Honduras) Carlos Mejía	19 February 2000 (aged 22)	24	38	62	4	3	7
5	DF	(Honduras) Marcelo Pereira	27 May 1995 (aged 27)	181	27	208	11	2	13
6	MF	(Honduras) Jason Sánchez	5 July 1998 (aged 23)	9	5	14	0	0	0
7	MF	(Honduras) Iván López	5 October 1990 (aged 31)	56	39	95	9	2	11
8	MF	(Honduras) Walter Martínez	26 March 1991 (aged 31)	158	37	195	16	2	18
9	FW	(Honduras) Eddie Hernández	27 February 1991 (aged 31)	63	32	95	23	9	32
10	FW	(Argentina) Mauro Ortiz	27 September 1994 (aged 27)	0	9	9	0	1	1
10	MF	(Argentina) Gaspar Triverio	6 January 1995 (aged 27)	0	13	13	0	3	3
11	FW	(Honduras) Ángel Tejeda	1 June 1991 (aged 31)	18	14	32	2	6	8
11	FW	(Argentina) Lucas Campana	9 March 1993 (aged 29)	0	17	17	0	5	5
12	MF	(Honduras) Raúl Santos	2 August 1992 (aged 29)	131	35	166	1	6	7
14	MF	(Honduras) Geovanni Bueso	12 April 2003 (aged 19)	2	5	7	0	0	0
15	MF	(Honduras) Juan Gómez	3 April 2000 (aged 22)	14	1	15	1	0	1
15	MF	(Honduras) Edwin Maldonado	4 March 1994 (aged 28)	0	10	10	0	0	0
16	MF	(Honduras) Héctor Castellanos	28 December 1992 (aged 29)	203	24	227	2	2	4
17	DF	(Honduras) Wesly Decas	11 August 1999 (aged 22)	64	36	100	1	0	1
18	DF	(Honduras) Diego Rodríguez	6 November 1995 (aged 26)	22	24	46	1	1	2
19	GK	(Argentina) Jonathan Rougier	29 October 1987 (aged 34)	175	18	193	0	0	0
21	FW	(Paraguay) Roberto Moreira	6 May 1987 (aged 35)	152	34	186	63	6	69
22	MF	(Honduras) Jesse Moncada	5 January 1990 (aged 32)	43	11	54	4	0	4
22	FW	(Honduras) Juan Obregón	29 October 1997 (aged 24)	0	7	7	0	1	1
23	MF	(Honduras) Juan Delgado	21 July 1992 (aged 29)	55	39	94	4	2	6
24	FW	(Colombia) Santiago Montoya	15 September 1991 (aged 30)	0	4	4	0	0	0
25	GK	(Honduras) Marlon Licona	9 February 1991 (aged 31)	117	24	141	0	0	0
27	MF	(Honduras) Óscar García	16 May 1990 (aged 32)	26	3	29	2	0	2
27	FW	(Honduras) Chistian Gutiérrez	27 February 1997 (aged 25)	0	6	6	0	0	0
30	DF	(Honduras) Osmar Gonzales	7 September 2000 (aged 21)	1	0	1	0	0	0
32	MF	(Honduras) Jonathan Núñez	26 November 2001 (aged 20)	46	35	81	1	2	3
33	DF	(Honduras) Albert Galindo	21 October 2001 (aged 20)	10	0	10	0	0	0
34	DF	(Argentina) Fabricio Brener	26 May 1998 (aged 24)	0	9	9	0	0	0
34	DF	(Honduras) Giancarlos Sacaza	18 January 2004 (aged 18)	0	1	1	0	0	0
35	DF	(Honduras) Cristopher Meléndez	25 November 1997 (aged 24)	91	25	116	4	1	5
39	FW	(Honduras) Marvin Maldonado	25 June 2003 (aged 19)	0	3	3	0	0	0
40	MF	(Honduras) Yostin Obando	29 April 2004 (aged 18)	8	9	17	0	2	2
50	FW	(Honduras) Aaron Barrios	19 October 2004 (aged 17)	0	4	4	0	0	0
54	FW	(Honduras) Andy Hernández	15 December 2003 (aged 18)	2	0	2	0	0	0
58	DF	(Honduras) Breyner Maradiaga	19 August 2003 (aged 18)	4	0	4	0	0	0
59	FW	(Honduras) José Oliva	16 May 2005 (aged 17)	2	2	4	0	0	0
67	MF	(Honduras) Rodrigo Rodríguez	20 June 2004 (aged 18)	0	4	4	0	0	0
Managers		(Argentina) Hernán Medina	5 September 1974 (aged 47)	24 March 2022 – 2 February 2023					
Managers		(Honduras) Ninrrol Medina	26 August 1976 (aged 45)	2 February 2023 –					

=== Goalkeeper's action ===
As of 7 May 2023

Goalkeeper	Years evaluated	Games	Goals	Per.
(Argentina) Jonathan Rougier	2017–2023	193	189	0.979
(Honduras) Hugo Caballero	2021–2023	1	1	1.000
(Honduras) Marlon Licona	2010–2017, 2018–2023	141	153	1.085

=== International caps ===
As of 22 March 2023

This is a list of players that were playing for Motagua during the 2022–23 season and were called to represent Honduras at different international competitions.

Player	Team	Event	Caps	Goals
Héctor Castellanos	Adult	Friendlies v Argentina, Guatemala, Qatar and Saudi Arabia	4	0
Wesly Decas	Adult	Friendly v Saudi Arabia	1	0
Iván López	Adult	Friendlies v Qatar and Saudi Arabia	2	0
Denil Maldonado	Adult	Friendlies v Argentina, Guatemala, Qatar and Saudi Arabia	4	0
Walter Martínez	Adult	Friendlies v Qatar and Saudi Arabia	2	0
Carlos Meléndez	Adult	Friendlies v Argentina, Guatemala and Qatar	3	0
Marcelo Pereira	Adult	Friendlies v Qatar and Saudi Arabia	2	0
Raúl Santos	Adult	Friendly v Argentina	1	0
Ángel Tejeda	Adult	Friendlies v Qatar and Saudi Arabia	2	0
Saúl Estrada	U-17	2023 CONCACAF U-17 Championship	4	0
Jordan García	U-17	2023 CONCACAF U-17 Championship	5	2
Owen Macías	U-17	2023 CONCACAF U-17 Championship	2	0
Johan Navas	U-17	2023 CONCACAF U-17 Championship	5	0

== Results ==
All times are local CST unless stated otherwise

=== Preseason and friendlies ===
8 July 2022 Friendly	NY Renegades (United States)	0–1	(Honduras) Motagua	Uniondale, United States
18:00 EST		Report	15' Rodríguez	Stadium: Mitchel Athletic Complex; Referee: Starting XI: 25 – Licona; 2 – Maldonado; 5 – Pereira; 7 – López; 8 – Martínez; 12 – Santos; 16 – Castellanos; 17 – Decas; 18 – Rodríguez; 21 – Moreira; 23 – Delgado

10 July 2022 Friendly	Comunicaciones (Guatemala)	2–1	(Honduras) Motagua	Richmond, United States
18:00 EST	López; Samayoa	Report	(penalty missed) Hernández; 87' Meléndez	Stadium: City Stadium; Referee: Starting XI: 19 – Rougier; 2 – Maldonado; 3 – Meléndez; 7 – López; 9 – Hernández; 12 – Santos; 16 – Castellanos; 17 – Decas; 18 – Rodríguez; 23 – Delgado; 27 – García

13 July 2022 Friendly	Motagua (Honduras)	2–1	(Guatemala) Municipal	Richmond, United States
20:00 EST	Pereira 20'; Santos 85'	Report	55' Morales	Stadium: City Stadium; Referee: Starting XI: 25 – Licona; 3 – Meléndez; 5 – Pereira; 7 – López; 8 – Martínez; 17 – Decas; 18 – Rodríguez; 21 – Moreira; 32 – Núñez; 34 – Brener; 35 – Meléndez

16 July 2022 Friendly	Motagua (Honduras)	0–1	(Guatemala) Municipal	Matthews, United States
20:00 EST		Report	3' Rotondi	Stadium: Sportsplex at Matthews; Referee: Starting XI: 25 – Licona; 2 – Maldonado; 3 – Meléndez; 4 – Mejía; 5 – Pereira; 6 – Sánchez; 9 – Hernández; 11 – Tejeda; 14 – Bueso; 27 – García; 34 – Brener

8 January 2023 Friendly	Génesis	0–2	Motagua	Comayagua
17:00			29' Santos; 45' Hernández	Stadium: Estadio Carlos Miranda; Referee: Starting XI: 19 – Rougier (substituted off); 3 – Meléndez (substituted off); 4 – Mejía (substituted off); 5 – Pereira (substituted off); 6 – Maldonado (substituted off); 7 – López (substituted off); 9 – Hernández (substituted off); 12 – Santos (substituted off); 17 – Decas (substituted off); 32 – Núñez (substituted off); 40 – Obando (substituted off); Substitutes; 25 – Licona (substituted on); 15 – Álvarez (substituted on); 28 – Bahr (substituted on); 18 – Rodríguez (substituted on); 35 – Meléndez (substituted on); 16 – Castellanos (substituted on); 27 – Gutiérrez (substituted on); 8 – Martínez (substituted on); 34 – Crisanto (substituted on); 23 – Delgado (substituted on); 21 – Moreira (substituted on)

11 January 2023 Friendly	Juticalpa	0–0	Motagua	Juticalpa
16:30				Stadium: Estadio Juan Ramón Brevé Vargas; Referee: Roberto González Starting XI: 25 – Licona (substituted off); 2 – Álvarez; 5 – Pereira; 8 – Martínez (substituted off); 9 – Hernández (substituted off); 12 – Santos (substituted off); 16 – Castellanos (substituted off); 17 – Decas (substituted off); 21 – Moreira (substituted off); 23 – Delgado (substituted off); 27 – Gutiérrez (substituted off); Substitutes; 19 – Rougier (substituted on) (substituted off); 1 – Facussé (substituted on); 18 – Rodríguez (substituted on); 35 – Meléndez (substituted on); 32 – Núñez (substituted on); 6 – Maldonado (substituted on); 4 – Mejía (substituted on); 40 – Obando (substituted on); 10 – Obregón (substituted on); 34 – Crisanto (substituted on)

14 January 2023 Friendly	Motagua (Honduras)	1–0	(Nicaragua) Real Estelí	Comayagua
13:00	Hernández 15'			Stadium: Estadio Carlos Miranda; Referee: Starting XI: 19 – Rougier; 3 – Meléndez; 4 – Mejía; 5 – Pereira; 9 – Hernández; 12 – Santos; 16 – Castellanos; 17 – Decas; 21 – Moreira; 32 – Núñez; 59 – Oliva

=== Apertura ===
31 July 2022 Week 1	Motagua	4–0	Honduras Progreso	Tegucigalpa
16:00	Moreira 32' 50'; Delgado 59'; Obando 73'	Report		Stadium: Estadio Nacional; Referee: Merlin Soto Starting XI: 25 – Licona; 2 – Maldonado; 5 – Pereira; 7 – López (substituted off) 63'; 16 – Castellanos; 17 – Decas; 18 – Rodríguez (substituted off) 56'; 21 – Moreira (substituted off) 56'; 23 – Delgado (substituted off) 63'; 32 – Núñez (substituted off) 71'; 35 – Meléndez; Substitutes; 9 – Hernández (substituted on) 56'; 40 – Obando (substituted on) 56'; 4 – Mejía (substituted on) 63'; 34 – Brener (substituted on) 63'; 8 – Martínez (substituted on) 71'
Note: Youngster Yostin Obando scored his first goal with the club. Argentinian midfielder Fabricio Brener made his debut for F.C. Motagua wearing jersey #34.

7 August 2022 Week 2	Real España	1–1	Motagua	San Pedro Sula
17:00	Montes 38'	Report	36' Moreira	Stadium: Estadio General Francisco Morazán; Referee: Nelson Salgado Starting XI: 25 – Licona; 2 – Maldonado; 3 – Meléndez; 7 – López (substituted off) 61'; 12 – Santos; 16 – Castellanos; 17 – Decas; 18 – Rodríguez (substituted off) 45+3'; 21 – Moreira (substituted off) 78'; 23 – Delgado (substituted off) 61'; 32 – Núñez; Substitutes; 4 – Mejía (substituted on) 45+3'; 9 – Hernández (substituted on) 61'; 8 – Martínez (substituted on) 61'; 34 – Brener (substituted on) 78'

10 August 2022 Week 3	Motagua	2–2	Vida	Tegucigalpa
19:00	Hernández 85'; Tejeda 90'	Report	51' Aguilar; 90+6' Agámez	Stadium: Estadio Nacional; Referee: Melvin Herrera Starting XI: 25 – Licona; 2 – Maldonado; 3 – Meléndez; 7 – López (substituted off) 60'; 8 – Martínez; 12 – Santos; 16 – Castellanos (substituted off) 72'; 17 – Decas; 21 – Moreira (substituted off) 60'; 22 – Moncada (substituted off) 60'; 34 – Brener (substituted off) 72'; Substitutes; 11 – Tejeda (substituted on) 60'; 4 – Mejía (substituted on) 60'; 9 – Hernández (substituted on) 60'; 23 – Delgado (substituted on) 72'; 32 – Núñez (substituted on) 72'

14 August 2022 Week 4	Motagua	4–1	Marathón	Tegucigalpa
16:00	López 44'; Rodríguez 48' (pen.); Vargas 66' (o.g.); Hernández 90'	Report	18' (pen.) Campana	Stadium: Estadio Nacional; Referee: Óscar Moncada Starting XI: 19 – Rougier; 2 – Maldonado; 3 – Meléndez; 7 – López (substituted off) 71'; 12 – Santos; 16 – Castellanos (substituted off) 37'; 17 – Decas; 18 – Rodríguez (substituted off) 64'; 21 – Moreira (substituted off) 52'; 23 – Delgado (substituted off) 64'; 32 – Núñez; Substitutes; 8 – Martínez (substituted on) 37'; 9 – Hernández (substituted on) 52'; 22 – Moncada (substituted on) 64'; 5 – Pereira (substituted on) 64'; 4 – Mejía (substituted on) 71'

20 August 2022 Week 5	UPNFM	2–3	Motagua	Tegucigalpa
19:00	Leverón 62' (pen.); Róchez 78'	Report	30' López; 74' Martínez; 87' Tejeda	Stadium: Estadio Nacional; Referee: Saíd Martínez Starting XI: 25 – Licona; 2 – Maldonado (substituted off) 55'; 5 – Pereira; 7 – López (substituted off) 65'; 11 – Tejeda; 17 – Decas; 22 – Moncada (substituted off) 66'; 23 – Delgado; 32 – Núñez (substituted off) 55'; 35 – Meléndez; 40 – Obando (substituted off) 65'; Substitutes; 12 – Santos (substituted on) 55'; 27 – García (substituted on) 55'; 4 – Mejía (substituted on) 65'; 59 – Oliva (substituted on) 65'; 8 – Martínez (substituted on) 66'

28 August 2022 Week 6	Olancho	0–1	Motagua	Juticalpa
15:00		Report	55' Hernández	Stadium: Estadio Juan Ramón Brevé Vargas; Referee: Nelson Salgado Starting XI: 25 – Licona; 2 – Maldonado; 3 – Meléndez; 6 – Sánchez; 8 – Martínez (substituted off) 67'; 9 – Hernández; 10 – Ortiz (substituted off) 67'; 12 – Santos; 17 – Decas; 21 – Moreira (substituted off) 23'; 22 – Moncada (substituted off) 84'; Substitutes; 7 – López (substituted on) 23' (substituted off) 73'; 35 – Meléndez (substituted on) 67'; 40 – Obando (substituted on) 67'; 4 – Mejía (substituted on) 73'; 16 – Castellanos (substituted on) 84'
Note: Argentinian forward Mauro Ortiz made his professional debut with the club.

1 September 2022 Week 7	Motagua	1–0	Olimpia	Tegucigalpa
20:00	Ortiz 89'	Report		Stadium: Estadio Nacional; Referee: Armando Castro Starting XI: 19 – Rougier; 2 – Maldonado; 5 – Pereira; 7 – López (substituted off) 64'; 11 – Tejeda (substituted off) 68'; 12 – Santos; 16 – Castellanos (substituted off) 68'; 17 – Decas; 18 – Rodríguez (substituted off) 78'; 23 – Delgado; 32 – Núñez; Substitutes; 10 – Ortiz (substituted on) 64'; 35 – Meléndez (substituted on) 68'; 9 – Hernández (substituted on) 68'; 8 – Martínez (substituted on) 78'
Note: Argentinian forward Mauro Ortiz scored his first goal with the club.

4 September 2022 Week 8	Real Sociedad	1–2	Motagua	Tocoa
14:00	Romero 36'	Report	50' (pen.) Hernández; 56' Martínez	Stadium: Estadio Francisco Martínez Durón; Referee: Julio Güity Starting XI: 25 – Licona; 3 – Meléndez; 5 – Pereira; 6 – Sánchez; 9 – Hernández; 10 – Ortiz (substituted off) 80'; 17 – Decas (substituted off) 61'; 22 – Moncada (substituted off) 46'; 23 – Delgado (substituted off) 46'; 35 – Meléndez; 40 – Obando (substituted off) 46'; Substitutes; 4 – Mejía (substituted on) 46'; 34 – Brener (substituted on) 46'; 8 – Martínez (substituted on) 46'; 14 – Bueso (substituted on) 61'; 27 – García (substituted on) 80'

11 September 2022 Week 9	Motagua	2–1	Victoria	Danlí
16:00	Hernández 1'; Moreira 90+4'	Report	81' Silva	Stadium: Estadio Marcelo Tinoco; Referee: Luís Mejía Starting XI: 25 – Licona; 2 – Maldonado; 3 – Meléndez; 4 – Mejía (substituted off) 61'; 7 – López (substituted off) 60'; 9 – Hernández (substituted off) 60'; 17 – Decas (substituted off) 77'; 23 – Delgado; 32 – Núñez; 34 – Brener (substituted off) 83'; 35 – Meléndez; Substitutes; 11 – Tejeda (substituted on) 60'; 21 – Moreira (substituted on) 60'; 14 – Bueso (substituted on) 61'; 22 – Moncada (substituted on) 77'; 8 – Martínez (substituted on) 83'
Note: This game was moved to Danlí due to repairs in the Estadio Nacional.

18 September 2022 Week 10	Honduras Progreso	0–1	Motagua	El Progreso
16:00		Report	33' Santos	Stadium: Estadio Humberto Micheletti; Referee: Selvin Brown Starting XI: 25 – Licona; 4 – Mejía (substituted off) 68'; 3 – Meléndez; 5 – Pereira; 7 – López (substituted off) 80'; 12 – Santos; 14 – Bueso (substituted off) 68'; 16 – Castellanos (substituted off) 46'; 21 – Moreira; 23 – Delgado (substituted off) 66'; 32 – Núñez; Substitutes; 35 – Meléndez (substituted on) 46'; 8 – Martínez (substituted on) 66'; 22 – Moncada (substituted on) 68'; 17 – Decas (substituted on) 68'; 9 – Hernández (substituted on) 80'
Note: F.C. Motagua obtained their 7th consecutive league win for the first time since 2018.

1 October 2022 Week 11	Motagua	1–2	Real España	Tegucigalpa
19:00	Tejeda 7'	Report	28' 38' Báez	Stadium: Estadio Nacional; Referee: Jefferson Escobar Starting XI: 25 – Licona; 2 – Maldonado; 3 – Meléndez; 7 – López (substituted off) 67'; 8 – Martínez; 11 – Tejeda (substituted off) 67'; 12 – Santos; 17 – Decas; 22 – Moncada (substituted off) 90+3'; 23 – Delgado (substituted off) 61'; 32 – Núñez; Substitutes; 10 – Ortiz (substituted on) 61'; 9 – Hernández (substituted on) 67'; 21 – Moreira (substituted on) 67'; 4 – Mejía (substituted on) 90+3'
Note: F.C. Motagua lost their unbeaten run.

8 October 2022 Week 12	Vida	0–3	Motagua	La Ceiba
19:30		Report	31' Meléndez; 78' Mejía; 87' Obando	Stadium: Estadio Nilmo Edwards; Referee: Nelson Salgado Starting XI: 25 – Licona; 2 – Maldonado; 4 – Mejía (substituted off) 79'; 5 – Pereira; 6 – Sánchez; 8 – Martínez (substituted off) 79'; 10 – Ortiz (substituted off) 66'; 11 – Tejeda (substituted off) 82'; 17 – Decas; 21 – Moreira; 35 – Meléndez; Substitutes; 18 – Rodríguez (substituted on) 79'; 15 – Gómez (substituted on) 66'; 27 – García (substituted on) 79'; 40 – Obando (substituted on) 82'

15 October 2022 Week 13	Marathón	2–2	Motagua	San Pedro Sula
15:15	Zúñiga 72'; Crisanto 90+4'	Report	20' (pen.) Tejeda; 55' Maldonado	Stadium: Estadio Yankel Rosenthal; Referee: Saíd Martínez Starting XI: 25 – Licona; 2 – Maldonado; 4 – Mejía (substituted off) 82'; 5 – Pereira; 7 – López (substituted off) 64'; 8 – Martínez (substituted off) 82'; 11 – Tejeda (substituted off) 69'; 12 – Santos; 16 – Castellanos (substituted off) 69'; 17 – Decas; 32 – Núñez; Substitutes; 21 – Moreira (substituted on) 64'; 23 – Delgado (substituted on) 69'; 40 – Obando (substituted on) 69'; 35 – Meléndez (substituted on) 82'; 9 – Hernández (substituted on) 82'
Note: Defender Cristopher Meléndez reached 100 league games with F.C. Motagua.

20 October 2022 Week 14	Motagua	2–2	UPNFM	Tegucigalpa
19:00	Castellanos 45+5'; Santos 50'	Report	26' Bodden; 90+3' Reyes	Stadium: Estadio Nacional; Referee: Nelson Salgado Starting XI: 19 – Rougier; 2 – Maldonado; 4 – Mejía (substituted off) 77'; 5 – Pereira; 7 – López (substituted off) 67'; 8 – Martínez (substituted off) 67'; 9 – Hernández (substituted off) 77'; 12 – Santos; 14 – Bueso; 16 – Castellanos; 32 – Núñez (substituted off) 81'; Substitutes; 11 – Tejeda (substituted on) 67'; 34 – Brener (substituted on) 67'; 18 – Rodríguez (substituted on) 77'; 21 – Moreira (substituted on) 77'; 23 – Delgado (substituted on) 81'

23 October 2022 Week 15	Motagua	1–3	Olancho	Tegucigalpa
16:00	Hernández 74'; Moreira (penalty missed)	Report	16' 28' Auzmendi; 51' Altamirano	Stadium: Estadio Nacional; Referee: Saíd Martínez Starting XI: 19 – Rougier; 3 – Meléndez; 4 – Mejía; 5 – Pereira; 11 – Tejeda (substituted off) 53'; 16 – Castellanos; 17 – Decas; 21 – Moreira; 23 – Delgado (substituted off) 53'; 32 – Núñez (substituted off) 53'; 35 – Meléndez (substituted off) 87'; Substitutes; 9 – Hernández (substituted on) 53'; 7 – López (substituted on) 53'; 8 – Martínez (substituted on) 53'; 34 – Brener (substituted on) 87'

6 November 2022 Week 16	Olimpia	4–0	Motagua	San Pedro Sula
18:00	Araújo 52'; Bengtson 56'; Chirinos 63'; Álvarez 79'	Report		Stadium: Estadio General Francisco Morazán; Attendance: 10,527; Referee: Nelson Salgado Starting XI: 19 – Rougier; 2 – Maldonado; 4 – Mejía (substituted off) 60'; 5 – Pereira; 7 – López (substituted off) 71'; 9 – Hernández (substituted off) 71'; 12 – Santos; 16 – Castellanos (substituted off) 36'; 17 – Decas; 18 – Rodríguez (substituted off) 61'; 23 – Delgado; Substitutes; 8 – Martínez (substituted on) 36'; 10 – Ortiz (substituted on) 60'; 35 – Meléndez (substituted on) 61'; 11 – Tejeda (substituted on) 71'; 21 – Moreira (substituted on) 71'
Note: This game was played at San Pedro Sula due to repairs being done at the Estadio Nacional. This was the largest defeat against C.D. Olimpia since 2007.

13 November 2022 Week 17	Motagua	2–2	Real Sociedad	Comayagua
16:30	Santos 58'; Tejeda 89'	Report	62' Martínez; 79' Delgado	Stadium: Estadio Carlos Miranda; Referee: Raúl Castro Starting XI: 25 – Licona; 2 – Maldonado; 4 – Mejía; 5 – Pereira; 10 – Ortiz (substituted off) 72'; 12 – Santos; 14 – Bueso (substituted off) 83'; 21 – Moreira (substituted off) 72'; 23 – Delgado; 32 – Núñez (substituted off) 83'; 34 – Brener (substituted off) 72'; Substitutes; 9 – Hernández (substituted on) 72'; 7 – López (substituted on) 72'; 8 – Martínez (substituted on) 72'; 11 – Tejeda (substituted on) 83'; 40 – Obando (substituted on) 83'

19 November 2022 Week 18	Victoria	1–0	Motagua	La Ceiba
15:00	Vega 2'	Report		Stadium: Estadio Nilmo Edwards; Referee: Armando Castro Starting XI: 25 – Licona; 2 – Maldonado; 4 – Mejía; 5 – Pereira; 10 – Ortiz (substituted off) 45+1'; 12 – Santos; 17 – Decas; 21 – Moreira (substituted off) 75'; 23 – Delgado (substituted off) 65'; 32 – Núñez (substituted off) 76'; 34 – Brener (substituted off) 45+1'; Substitutes; 7 – López (substituted on) 45+1'; 8 – Martínez (substituted on) 45+1'; 40 – Obando (substituted on) 65'; 9 – Hernández (substituted on) 75'; 6 – Sánchez (substituted on) 76'
Note: F.C. Motagua finished the regular season in second place and qualified directly to the semifinal stage.

30 November 2022 Semifinals	Victoria	0–0	Motagua	La Ceiba
19:30		Report		Stadium: Estadio Nilmo Edwards; Referee: Melvin Matamoros Starting XI: 25 – Licona; 2 – Maldonado; 3 – Meléndez; 4 – Mejía (substituted off) 86'; 7 – López (substituted off) 75'; 12 – Santos; 17 – Decas; 21 – Moreira (substituted off) 75'; 22 – Moncada (substituted off) 86'; 23 – Delgado (substituted off) 75'; 32 – Núñez; Substitutes; 11 – Tejeda (substituted on) 75'; 35 – Meléndez (substituted on) 75'; 9 – Hernández (substituted on) 75'; 18 – Rodríguez (substituted on) 86'; 8 – Martínez (substituted on) 86'

3 December 2022 Semifinals	Motagua	2–1	Victoria	Comayagua
16:30	Moreira 42'; Tejeda 85'	Report	72' Vega	Stadium: Estadio Carlos Miranda; Referee: Armando Castro Starting XI: 25 – Licona; 2 – Maldonado; 3 – Meléndez; 4 – Mejía (substituted off) 68'; 7 – López (substituted off) 74'; 12 – Santos; 17 – Decas; 21 – Moreira (substituted off) 74'; 22 – Moncada; 23 – Delgado (substituted off) 90'; 32 – Núñez (substituted off) 90'; Substitutes; 8 – Martínez (substituted on) 68'; 11 – Tejeda (substituted on) 74'; 9 – Hernández (substituted on) 74'; 35 – Meléndez (substituted on) 90'; 6 – Sánchez (substituted on) 90'
Note: With a 2–1 win on aggregate, F.C. Motagua advanced to the final stage.

10 December 2022 Final	Motagua	0–1	Olimpia	Comayagua
16:30		Report	90+4' (pen.) Arboleda	Stadium: Estadio Carlos Miranda; Referee: Armando Castro Starting XI: 25 – Licona; 2 – Maldonado; 3 – Meléndez; 7 – López; 12 – Santos; 17 – Decas; 18 – Rodríguez (substituted off) 90+5'; 21 – Moreira; 22 – Moncada; 32 – Núñez; 35 – Meléndez (substituted off) 66'; Substitutes; 23 – Delgado (substituted on) 66'; 4 – Mejía (substituted on) 90+5'

17 December 2022 Final	Olimpia	2–0	Motagua	La Ceiba
19:00	García 45+5'; Chirinos 69'	Report		Stadium: Estadio Nilmo Edwards; Referee: Nelson Salgado Starting XI: 25 – Licona; 2 – Maldonado; 3 – Meléndez; 7 – López (substituted off) 56'; 8 – Martínez (substituted off) 67'; 12 – Santos; 17 – Decas; 18 – Rodríguez (substituted off) 67'; 21 – Moreira; 23 – Delgado (substituted off) 56'; 32 – Núñez (substituted off) 67'; Substitutes; 11 – Tejeda (substituted on) 56'; 10 – Ortiz (substituted on) 56'; 4 – Mejía (substituted on) 67'; 9 – Hernández (substituted on) 67'; 16 – Castellanos (substituted on) 67'

=== Clausura ===
21 January 2023 Week 1	UPNFM	2–1	Motagua	Choluteca
17:00	Morazán 57'; Róchez 69'	Report	15' Mejía	Stadium: Estadio Emilio Williams Agasse; Referee: Melvin Herrera Starting XI: 19 – Rougier; 3 – Meléndez; 4 – Mejía; 5 – Pereira; 7 – López (substituted off) 61'; 9 – Hernández; 12 – Santos; 16 – Castellanos (substituted off) 80'; 17 – Decas (substituted off) 80'; 32 – Núñez (substituted off) 61'; 59 – Oliva (substituted off) 61'; Substitutes; 15 – Maldonado (substituted on) 61'; 23 – Delgado (substituted on) 61'; 11 – Campana (substituted on) 61'; 18 – Rodríguez (substituted on) 80'; 40 – Obando (substituted on) 80'
Note: Both Edwin Maldonado and Lucas Campana made their official debut with the club.

25 January 2023 Week 2	Motagua	1–0	Real España	Comayagua
19:15	Núñez 77'	Report		Stadium: Estadio Carlos Miranda; Referee: Selvin Brown Starting XI: 19 – Rougier; 3 – Meléndez; 4 – Mejía (substituted off) 69'; 5 – Pereira; 7 – López (substituted off) 90+4'; 11 – Campana (substituted off) 75'; 12 – Santos; 15 – Maldonado (substituted off) 69'; 16 – Castellanos; 17 – Decas; 23 – Delgado (substituted off) 75'; Substitutes; 32 – Núñez (substituted on) 69'; 8 – Martínez (substituted on) 69'; 22 – Obregón (substituted on) 75'; 21 – Moreira (substituted on) 75'; 35 – Meléndez (substituted on) 90+4'
Note: Forward Juan Obregón made his debut with F.C. Motagua.

28 January 2023 Week 3	Victoria	2–2	Motagua	Olanchito
19:30	Bernárdez 45+2'; Hurtado 67'	Report	38' Campana; 60' Santos	Stadium: Estadio San Jorge; Referee: Óscar Moncada Starting XI: 19 – Rougier; 3 – Meléndez; 4 – Mejía (substituted off) 79'; 5 – Pereira; 7 – López; 11 – Campana (substituted off) 85'; 12 – Santos; 15 – Maldonado; 16 – Castellanos (substituted off) 87'; 17 – Decas; 23 – Delgado (substituted off) 79'; Substitutes; 22 – Obregón (substituted on) 79'; 8 – Martínez (substituted on) 79'; 21 – Moreira (substituted on) 85'; 32 – Núñez (substituted on) 87'
Note: Argentinian striker Lucas Campana scored his first goal for the club.

1 February 2023 Week 4	Motagua	0–1	Olancho	Comayagua
19:00		Report	47' Cálix	Stadium: Estadio Carlos Miranda; Referee: Raúl Castro Starting XI: 19 – Rougier; 3 – Meléndez; 4 – Mejía; 5 – Pereira; 7 – López (substituted off) 64'; 11 – Campana (substituted off) 56'; 12 – Santos (substituted off) 64'; 15 – Maldonado (substituted off) 56'; 16 – Castellanos (substituted off) 21'; 17 – Decas; 23 – Delgado; Substitutes; 32 – Núñez (substituted on) 21'; 22 – Obregón (substituted on) 56'; 21 – Moreira (substituted on) 56'; 35 – Meléndez (substituted on) 64'; 8 – Martínez (substituted on) 64'
Note: Manager Hernán Medina was sacked a day after this match due to poor results.

4 February 2023 Week 5	Olimpia	3–1	Motagua	San Pedro Sula
19:00	Bengtson 45+8' (pen.); Benguché 54'; Araújo 88'	Report	27' Campana	Stadium: Estadio Olímpico Metropolitano; Referee: Selvin Brown Starting XI: 19 – Rougier; 2 – Álvarez (substituted off) 65'; 3 – Meléndez; 5 – Pereira; 8 – Martínez; 11 – Campana (substituted off) 42'; 17 – Decas; 18 – Rodríguez; 21 – Moreira (substituted off) 65'; 23 – Delgado (substituted off) 75'; 32 – Núñez (substituted off) 75'; Substitutes; 9 – Hernández (substituted on) 42'; 4 – Mejía (substituted on) 65'; 12 – Santos (substituted on) 65'; 15 – Maldonado (substituted on) 75'; 7 – López (substituted on) 75'
Note: Former player Ninrrol Medina was hired as new manager and made his debut. Defender Kevin Álvarez made his debut with the club. This was F.C. Motagua's 2000th game in league's history.

11 February 2023 Week 6	Motagua	2–1	Vida	Comayagua
16:00	Santos 45+4' 89'	Report	15' Moncada	Stadium: Estadio Carlos Miranda; Referee: Raúl Castro Starting XI: 25 – Licona; 2 – Álvarez; 3 – Meléndez; 8 – Martínez (substituted off) 78'; 9 – Hernández (substituted off) 68'; 11 – Campana (substituted off) 77'; 12 – Santos; 17 – Decas; 18 – Rodríguez (substituted off) 60'; 23 – Delgado; 32 – Núñez (substituted off) 60'; Substitutes; 4 – Mejía (substituted on) 60'; 7 – López (substituted on) 60'; 21 – Moreira (substituted on) 68'; 10 – Triverio (substituted on) 77'; 24 – Montoya (substituted on) 78'
Note: Argentinian Gaspar Triverio and Colombian Santiago Montoya made their debuts with the club.

15 February 2023 Week 7	Real Sociedad	0–0	Motagua	Tocoa
18:15		Report		Stadium: Estadio Francisco Martínez Durón; Referee: Luís Mejía Starting XI: 19 – Rougier; 3 – Meléndez; 7 – López (substituted off) 79'; 8 – Martínez (substituted off) 73'; 12 – Santos; 15 – Maldonado (substituted off) 46'; 17 – Decas; 18 – Rodríguez (substituted off) 66'; 21 – Moreira (substituted off) 66'; 23 – Delgado; 35 – Meléndez; Substitutes; 10 – Triverio (substituted on) 46'; 4 – Mejía (substituted on) 66'; 11 – Campana (substituted on) 66'; 24 – Montoya (substituted on) 73'; 39 – Maldonado (substituted on) 79'
Note: Forward Marvin Maldonado made his debut with the club.

19 February 2023 Week 8	Marathón	1–1	Motagua	San Pedro Sula
15:30	Zúñiga 27'	Report	11' Campana	Stadium: Estadio Yankel Rosenthal; Referee: Nelson Salgado Starting XI: 25 – Licona; 3 – Meléndez; 4 – Mejía (substituted off) 68'; 7 – López (substituted off) 68'; 8 – Martínez (substituted off) 59'; 11 – Campana; 12 – Santos; 17 – Decas; 18 – Rodríguez (substituted off) 59'; 23 – Delgado; 35 – Meléndez (substituted off) 82'; Substitutes; 10 – Triverio (substituted on) 59'; 24 – Montoya (substituted on) 59'; 27 – Gutiérrez (substituted on) 68'; 21 – Moreira (substituted on) 68'; 2 – Álvarez (substituted on) 82'
Note: Forward Chistian Gutiérrez made his debut with the club.

25 February 2023 Week 9	Motagua	1–1	Honduras Progreso	Choluteca
19:30	Triverio 56'	Report	19' (pen.) Domínguez	Stadium: Estadio Emilio Williams Agasse; Referee: Jefferson Escobar Starting XI: 19 – Rougier; 5 – Pereira; 7 – López; 8 – Martínez; 11 – Campana (substituted off) 71'; 12 – Santos; 16 – Castellanos; 18 – Rodríguez; 23 – Delgado; 34 – Sacaza (substituted off) 90'; 35 – Meléndez (substituted off) 32'; Substitutes; 10 – Triverio (substituted on) 32'; 21 – Moreira (substituted on) 71'; 9 – Hernández (substituted on) 90'
Note: Defender Giancarlos Sacaza made his debut with the club. Midfielder Gaspar Triverio scored his first goal for F.C. Motagua. Defender Marcelo Pereira reached 200 league games with the club.

1 March 2023 Week 10	Motagua	4–3	UPNFM	Comayagua
19:00	Núñez 18'; Hernández 35'; Campana 72' (pen.); Pereira 80'	Report	14' Macías; 66' (pen.) Leverón; 90+6' Vásquez	Stadium: Estadio Carlos Miranda; Referee: Armando Castro Starting XI: 25 – Licona; 3 – Meléndez; 5 – Pereira; 7 – López (substituted off) 79'; 9 – Hernández (substituted off) 74'; 10 – Triverio (substituted off) 74'; 11 – Campana (substituted off) 74'; 12 – Santos; 17 – Decas; 23 – Delgado (substituted off) 87'; 32 – Núñez; Substitutes; 4 – Mejía (substituted on) 74'; 22 – Obregón (substituted on) 74'; 21 – Moreira (substituted on) 74'; 27 – Gutiérrez (substituted on) 79'; 16 – Castellanos (substituted on) 87'

4 March 2023 Week 11	Real España	0–3	Motagua	San Pedro Sula
18:00		Report	9' Meléndez; 22' (o.g.) García; 89' Castellanos	Stadium: Estadio Olímpico Metropolitano; Referee: Saíd Martínez Starting XI: 19 – Rougier; 3 – Meléndez; 5 – Pereira; 7 – López (substituted off) 46'; 9 – Hernández; 10 – Triverio (substituted off) 46'; 11 – Campana (substituted off) 61'; 12 – Santos; 17 – Decas; 23 – Delgado (substituted off) 46'; 32 – Núñez (substituted off) 71'; Substitutes; 4 – Mejía (substituted on) 46'; 16 – Castellanos (substituted on) 46'; 8 – Martínez (substituted on) 46'; 22 – Obregón (substituted on) 61'; 15 – Maldonado (substituted on) 71'

12 March 2023 Week 12	Motagua	3–1	Victoria	Comayagua
17:00	Pereira 7'; Moreira 28'; Silva 40' (o.g.)	Report	81' Bernárdez	Stadium: Estadio Carlos Miranda; Referee: Raúl Castro Starting XI: 25 – Licona; 5 – Pereira; 8 – Martínez (substituted off) 66'; 15 – Maldonado (substituted off) 46'; 16 – Castellanos (substituted off) 46'; 17 – Decas; 18 – Rodríguez (substituted off) 73'; 21 – Moreira; 27 – Gutiérrez; 35 – Meléndez; 50 – Barrios (substituted off) 66'; Substitutes; 23 – Delgado (substituted on) 46'; 32 – Núñez (substituted on) 46'; 7 – López (substituted on) 66'; 67 – Rodríguez (substituted on) 66'; 3 – Meléndez (substituted on) 73'
Note: Youngsters Aaron Barrios and Rodrigo Rodríguez made their debuts with the club.

19 March 2023 Week 13	Olancho	1–0	Motagua	Juticalpa
16:00	Decas 36' (o.g.)	Report		Stadium: Estadio Juan Ramón Brevé Vargas; Referee: Saíd Martínez Starting XI: 19 – Rougier; 5 – Pereira; 8 – Martínez (substituted off) 66'; 16 – Castellanos (substituted off) 46'; 17 – Decas; 18 – Rodríguez; 21 – Moreira; 23 – Delgado (substituted off) 77'; 27 – Gutiérrez (substituted off) 59'; 35 – Meléndez; 50 – Barrios (substituted off) 46'; Substitutes; 9 – Hernández (substituted on) 46'; 32 – Núñez (substituted on) 46'; 10 – Triverio (substituted on) 59'; 7 – López (substituted on) 66'; 11 – Campana (substituted on) 77'

1 April 2023 Week 14	Motagua	1–3	Olimpia	Comayagua
19:00	Hernández 45+2'	Report	33' Bengtson; 36' 47' Benguché	Stadium: Estadio Carlos Miranda; Referee: Nelson Salgado Starting XI: 25 – Licona; 5 – Pereira; 7 – López (substituted off) 65'; 9 – Hernández (substituted off) 65'; 10 – Triverio (substituted off) 58'; 11 – Campana (substituted off) 52'; 12 – Santos; 17 – Decas; 18 – Rodríguez; 23 – Delgado; 32 – Núñez (substituted off) 46'; Substitutes; 8 – Martínez (substituted on) 46'; 2 – Álvarez (substituted on) 52'; 4 – Mejía (substituted on) 58'; 16 – Castellanos (substituted on) 65'; 21 – Moreira (substituted on) 65'

8 April 2023 Week 15	Vida	0–1	Motagua	La Ceiba
19:30		Report	90+2' Delgado	Stadium: Estadio Nilmo Edwards; Attendance: 500; Referee: Kelvin Pineda Starting XI: 19 – Rougier; 2 – Álvarez; 4 – Mejía (substituted off) 64'; 11 – Campana (substituted off) 64'; 12 – Santos; 18 – Rodríguez; 21 – Moreira; 24 – Montoya (substituted off) 46'; 27 – Gutiérrez (substituted off) 64'; 32 – Núñez (substituted off) 69'; 35 – Meléndez; Substitutes; 67 – Rodríguez (substituted on) 46'; 9 – Hernández (substituted on) 64'; 7 – López (substituted on) 64'; 8 – Martínez (substituted on) 64'; 23 – Delgado (substituted on) 69'

16 April 2023 Week 16	Motagua	2–2	Real Sociedad	Comayagua
16:00	Triverio 13' 17'	Report	24' Torres; 48' Romero	Stadium: Estadio Carlos Miranda; Attendance: 2,000; Referee: Óscar Moncada Starting XI: 25 – Licona; 2 – Álvarez (substituted off) 26'; 3 – Meléndez; 4 – Mejía; 10 – Triverio (substituted off) 73'; 12 – Santos; 18 – Rodríguez; 21 – Moreira (substituted off) 63'; 22 – Obregón (substituted off) 46'; 23 – Delgado; 67 – Rodríguez (substituted off) 46'; Substitutes; 35 – Meléndez (substituted on) 26'; 50 – Barrios (substituted on) 46'; 32 – Núñez (substituted on) 46'; 9 – Hernández (substituted on) 63'; 7 – López (substituted on) 73'

23 April 2023 Week 17	Motagua	2–2	Marathón	Comayagua
16:00	Campana 55' (pen.); Mejía 68'	Report	30' Castillo; 83' Aguilera	Stadium: Estadio Carlos Miranda; Referee: Saíd Martínez Starting XI: 19 – Rougier; 3 – Meléndez; 7 – López; 8 – Martínez (substituted off) 46'; 9 – Hernández (substituted off) 46'; 10 – Triverio (substituted off) 65'; 12 – Santos; 16 – Castellanos (substituted off) 46'; 18 – Rodríguez; 32 – Núñez (substituted off) 75'; 35 – Meléndez; Substitutes; 4 – Mejía (substituted on) 46'; 23 – Delgado (substituted on) 46'; 11 – Campana (substituted on) 46'; 27 – Gutiérrez (substituted on) 65'; 67 – Rodríguez (substituted on) 75'

29 April 2023 Week 18	Honduras Progreso	1–1	Motagua	El Progreso
15:30	Mora 15'	Report	60' Hernández	Stadium: Estadio Humberto Micheletti; Referee: Nelson Salgado Starting XI: 25 – Licona; 3 – Meléndez (substituted off) 69'; 4 – Mejía; 5 – Pereira; 7 – López; 10 – Triverio (substituted off) 38'; 12 – Santos; 17 – Decas; 23 – Delgado; 32 – Núñez (substituted off) 83'; 39 – Maldonado (substituted off) 69'; Substitutes; 9 – Hernández (substituted on) 38'; 50 – Barrios (substituted on) 69'; 35 – Meléndez (substituted on) 69'; 15 – Maldonado (substituted on) 83'
Note: After 18 weeks, F.C. Motagua finished the regular season in 5th place and qualified to the play-off stage.

3 May 2023 Play-offs	Motagua	1–2	Marathón	Comayagua
18:00	Obregón 90+7'	Report	55' Vega; 79' Ramírez	Stadium: Estadio Carlos Miranda; Referee: Luís Mejía Starting XI: 19 – Rougier; 3 – Meléndez; 4 – Mejía; 5 – Pereira; 11 – Campana (substituted off) 80'; 12 – Santos; 17 – Decas; 18 – Rodríguez (substituted off) 57'; 21 – Moreira (substituted off) 9'; 23 – Delgado (substituted off) 80'; 32 – Núñez; Substitutes; 22 – Obregón (substituted on) 9'; 8 – Martínez (substituted on) 57'; 10 – Triverio (substituted on) 80'; 39 – Maldonado (substituted on) 80'
Note: Forward Juan Obregón scored his first ever goal for F.C. Motagua.

7 May 2023 Play-offs	Marathón	0–0	Motagua	San Pedro Sula
15:30		Report		Stadium: Estadio Yankel Rosenthal; Referee: Melvin Matamoros Starting XI: 19 – Rougier; 3 – Meléndez; 4 – Mejía (substituted off) 74'; 5 – Pereira; 7 – López; 9 – Hernández; 12 – Santos; 16 – Castellanos (substituted off) 14'; 17 – Decas; 18 – Rodríguez (substituted off) 56'; 32 – Núñez (substituted off) 74'; Substitutes; 15 – Maldonado (substituted on) 14'; 11 – Campana (substituted on) 56'; 10 – Triverio (substituted on) 74'; 8 – Martínez (substituted on) 74'
Note: With a 1–2 aggregate score, F.C. Motagua failed to qualify to the semifinals for the first time since 2014. Defender Wesly Decas reached 100 league games playing for the club.

=== CONCACAF League ===
17 August 2022 Round of 16	Cibao (Dominican Republic)	0–1	(Honduras) Motagua	Santiago de los Caballeros, Dominican Republic
18:00 AST		Report	79' Mejía	Stadium: Estadio Cibao FC; Referee: Joe Dickerson (USA) Starting XI: 19 – Rougier; 2 – Maldonado; 5 – Pereira; 7 – López (substituted off) 73'; 11 – Tejeda; 12 – Santos; 17 – Decas; 18 – Rodríguez (substituted off) 62'; 22 – Moncada (substituted off) 73'; 32 – Núñez (substituted off) 86'; 34 – Brener (substituted off) 62'; Substitutes; 6 – Sánchez (substituted on) 62'; 8 – Martínez (substituted on) 62'; 21 – Moreira (substituted on) 73'; 4 – Mejía (substituted on) 73'; 35 – Meléndez (substituted on) 86'
Note: This was the first ever encounter between F.C. Motagua and Cibao FC, and the first one against a Dominican team overall. Defender Carlos Mejía scored his first international goal with the club.

24 August 2022 Round of 16	Motagua (Honduras)	2–0	(Dominican Republic) Cibao	Tegucigalpa, Honduras
18:00	Tejeda 51'; Hernández 90'	Report		Stadium: Estadio Nacional; Referee: Benjamín Pineda (CRC) Starting XI: 19 – Rougier; 3 – Meléndez; 5 – Pereira; 7 – López (substituted off) 58'; 11 – Tejeda (substituted off) 58'; 12 – Santos; 17 – Decas (substituted off) 68'; 18 – Rodríguez; 27 – García (substituted off) 68'; 32 – Núñez; 34 – Brener (substituted off) 75'; Substitutes; 9 – Hernández (substituted on) 58'; 21 – Moreira (substituted on) 58'; 8 – Martínez (substituted on) 68'; 2 – Maldonado (substituted on) 68'; 35 – Meléndez (substituted on) 75'
Note: With a 3–0 aggregated score, F.C. Motagua advanced to their 5th straight CONCACAF League quarter-finals.

8 September 2022 Quarterfinals	Motagua (Honduras)	0–0	(Panama) Tauro	Tegucigalpa, Honduras
16:00	Tejeda (penalty missed)	Report		Stadium: Estadio Nacional; Referee: Juan Calderón (CRC) Starting XI: 19 – Rougier; 2 – Maldonado; 3 – Meléndez; 5 – Pereira; 7 – López (substituted off) 68'; 10 – Ortiz (substituted off) 55'; 11 – Tejeda; 12 – Santos; 16 – Castellanos (substituted off) 89'; 18 – Rodríguez (substituted off) 55'; 32 – Núñez; Substitutes; 8 – Martínez (substituted on) 55'; 4 – Mejía (substituted on) 55'; 9 – Hernández (substituted on) 68'; 35 – Meléndez (substituted on) 89'
Note: This was the 5th encounter between F.C. Motagua and Tauro F.C. in history, and the first one since 2018.

14 September 2022 Quarterfinals	Tauro (Panama)	0–0 (4–5 p)	(Honduras) Motagua	Penonomé, Panama
20:00		Report		Stadium: Estadio Universitario F.C. Referee: José Torres (PUR) Starting XI: 19 – Rougier; 2 – Maldonado; 5 – Pereira; 7 – López (substituted off) 76'; 8 – Martínez (substituted off) 57'; 9 – Hernández (substituted off) 76'; 12 – Santos; 16 – Castellanos; 17 – Decas; 18 – Rodríguez (substituted off) 68'; 23 – Delgado (substituted off) 57'; Substitutes; 22 – Moncada (substituted on) 57'; 4 – Mejía (substituted on) 57'; 10 – Ortiz (substituted on) 68'; 11 – Tejeda (substituted on) 76'; 21 – Moreira (substituted on) 76'
	Penalties
	Aguilar (penalty scored); Gutiérrez (penalty scored); Botello (penalty scored); Camargo (penalty scored); Rodríguez (penalty missed)		(penalty scored) Moreira; (penalty scored) Tejeda; (penalty scored) Decas; (penalty scored) Santos; (penalty scored) Moncada
Note: Goalkeeper Jonathan Rougier saved the last penalty shoot-out from Tauro F.C. and thanks to a 5–4 win on penalties after a 0–0 score on aggregate, F.C. Motagua advanced to their 4th CONCACAF League semifinal in their history.

5 October 2022 Semifinals	Motagua (Honduras)	0–0	(Honduras) Olimpia	Tegucigalpa, Honduras
19:00		Report		Stadium: Estadio Nacional; Referee: Mario Escobar (GUA) Starting XI: 19 – Rougier; 2 – Maldonado; 3 – Meléndez; 7 – López (substituted off) 78'; 9 – Hernández (substituted off) 78'; 12 – Santos; 16 – Castellanos; 17 – Decas; 18 – Rodríguez (substituted off) 62'; 23 – Delgado; 32 – Núñez (substituted off) 62'; Substitutes; 10 – Ortiz (substituted on) 62'; 8 – Martínez (substituted on) 62'; 21 – Moreira (substituted on) 78'; 11 – Tejeda (substituted on) 78'
Note: This was the first international encounter between these two teams since 2020.

11 October 2022 Semifinals	Olimpia (Honduras)	1–0	(Honduras) Motagua	Tegucigalpa, Honduras
20:15	Sánchez 87'	Report		Stadium: Estadio Nacional; Referee: Iván Cisneros (SLV) Starting XI: 19 – Rougier; 3 – Meléndez; 5 – Pereira (yellow card) 47' (yellow-red card) 58'; 7 – López (substituted off) 58'; 8 – Martínez (substituted off) 70'; 9 – Hernández; 12 – Santos; 16 – Castellanos; 22 – Moncada (substituted off) 62'; 23 – Delgado (substituted off) 70'; 35 – Meléndez; Substitutes; 11 – Tejeda (substituted on) 58'; 4 – Mejía (substituted on) 62'; 10 – Ortiz (substituted on) 70'; 32 – Núñez (substituted on) 70'
Note: With a 0–1 score on aggregate, F.C. Motagua failed to qualify to their 4th CONCACAF League final.

=== CONCACAF Champions League ===
9 March 2023 Round of 16	Motagua (Honduras)	0–0	(Mexico) Pachuca	San Pedro Sula, Honduras
19:00		Report		Stadium: Estadio Olímpico Metropolitano; Referee: Drew Fischer (CAN) Starting XI: 19 – Rougier; 3 – Meléndez; 7 – López (substituted off) 81'; 9 – Hernández (substituted off) 69'; 10 – Triverio (substituted off) 76'; 11 – Campana (substituted off) 81'; 12 – Santos; 17 – Decas; 23 – Delgado; 32 – Núñez (substituted off) 69'; 35 – Meléndez; Substitutes; 16 – Castellanos (substituted on) 69'; 4 – Mejía (substituted on) 69'; 8 – Martínez (substituted on) 76'; 21 – Moreira (substituted on) 81'; 22 – Obregón (substituted on) 81'
Note: This was the first encounter between these two sides since 2008.

16 March 2023 Round of 16	Pachuca (Mexico)	1–1	(Honduras) Motagua	Pachuca, Mexico
20:15	Hernández 73'	Report	89' (pen.) Hernández	Stadium: Estadio Hidalgo; Referee: Iván Cisneros (SLV) Starting XI: 25 – Licona; 5 – Pereira; 7 – López (substituted off) 57'; 9 – Hernández; 10 – Triverio (substituted off) 74'; 11 – Campana (substituted off) 58'; 12 – Santos; 17 – Decas; 23 – Delgado; 32 – Núñez (substituted off) 74'; 35 – Meléndez; Substitutes; 4 – Mejía (substituted on) 57' (substituted off) 90+5'; 21 – Moreira (substituted on) 58'; 16 – Castellanos (substituted on) 74'; 8 – Martínez (substituted on) 74'; 18 – Rodríguez (substituted on) 90+5'
Note: F.C. Motagua became the first Central American club to eliminate a Liga MX team in a two leg series in the CONCACAF Champions League since its new era (2008–).

5 April 2023 Quarterfinals	Motagua (Honduras)	0–1	(Mexico) UANL	San Pedro Sula, Honduras
18:00		Report	44' Quiñones	Stadium: Estadio Olímpico Metropolitano; Referee: Armando Villarreal (USA) Starting XI: 25 – Licona; 3 – Meléndez; 5 – Pereira; 7 – López (substituted off) 58'; 8 – Martínez; 9 – Hernández (substituted off) 72'; 10 – Triverio (substituted off) 59'; 16 – Castellanos (substituted off) 72'; 17 – Decas (substituted off) 58'; 23 – Delgado; 35 – Meléndez; Substitutes; 11 – Campana (substituted on) 58'; 18 – Rodríguez (substituted on) 58'; 22 – Obregón (substituted on) 59'; 21 – Moreira (substituted on) 72'; 32 – Núñez (substituted on) 72'
Note: This was the first ever encounter between these two sides.

13 April 2023 Quarterfinals	UANL (Mexico)	5–0	(Honduras) Motagua	San Nicolás de los Garza, Mexico
22:00	Gignac 27' 66'; Quiñones 83'; Angulo 88'; Ibáñez 90'	Report		Stadium: Estadio Universitario; Referee: Walter López (GUA) Starting XI: 19 – Rougier; 3 – Meléndez; 5 – Pereira; 7 – López (substituted off) 62'; 8 – Martínez (substituted off) 63'; 9 – Hernández (substituted off) 73'; 12 – Santos; 16 – Castellanos (substituted off) 46'; 18 – Rodríguez; 23 – Delgado; 35 – Meléndez (substituted off) 46'; Substitutes; 32 – Núñez (substituted on) 46'; 2 – Álvarez (substituted on) 46'; 11 – Campana (substituted on) 62'; 10 – Triverio (substituted on) 63'; 21 – Moreira (substituted on) 73'
Note: With a 0–6 aggregated score, F.C. Motagua could not advance to the semifinal stage.

== Statistics ==
As of 7 May 2023

Competition	GP	GW	GD	GL	GF	GA	GD	CS	SG	Per
Liga Nacional	42	16	14	12	61	54	+7	11	9	49.21%
CONCACAF League	6	2	3	1	3	1	+2	5	4	50.00%
CONCACAF Champions League	4	0	2	2	1	7	–6	1	3	16.67%
Others	7	4	1	2	7	4	+3	4	2	61.90%
Totals	59	22	20	17	72	66	+6	21	18	48.59%
