= Denil Maldonado =

Honduran footballer (born 1998)

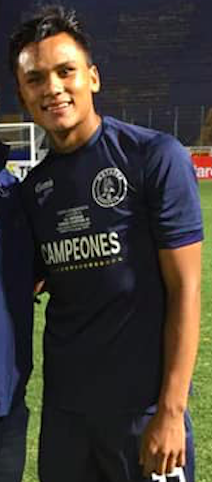

Personal information
- Full name: Denil Omar Maldonado Munguía
- Date of birth: 26 May 1998 (age 28)
- Place of birth: Tegucigalpa, Honduras
- Height: 1.84 m (6 ft 0 in)
- Position: Defender

Team information
- Current team: Rubin Kazan
- Number: 3

Senior career*
Years	Team	Apps	(Gls)
2015–2024	Motagua	99	(4)
2020	→ Pachuca (loan)	0	(0)
2020–2021	→ Everton (loan)	19	(1)
2023	→ Los Angeles FC (loan)	21	(1)
2024	→ Universitatea Craiova (loan)	33	(5)
2025	Universitatea Craiova	15	(1)
2025–	Rubin Kazan	19	(0)

International career^{‡}
2015	Honduras U17	2	(0)
2017	Honduras U20	10	(1)
2018	Honduras U21	5	(1)
2019–2021	Honduras Olympic	13	(2)
2019–	Honduras	48	(1)
Medal record
Men's football
Representing Honduras
CONCACAF U-20 Championship
Silver medal – second place	2017 Costa Rica	Team competition
Pan American Games
Silver medal – second place	2019 Lima	Team competition
- * Club domestic league appearances and goals as of 21 November 2026 ‡ National team caps and goals as of 17 November 2026

Denil Omar Maldonado Munguía (Note: In this Spanish name, the first or paternal surname is Maldonado and the second or maternal family name is Munguía.) (born 26 May 1998) is a Honduran professional footballer who plays as a defender for Russian Premier League club Rubin Kazan and the Honduras national team.

== Club career ==
=== Motagua ===
Maldonado started his professional career with F.C. Motagua under the management of Diego Vásquez. He made his debut on 6 September 2015, in a 4–2 home defeat to Real Sociedad. He scored his first goal on 2 December 2018 in the Apertura tournament semi-final against Platense.

=== Pachuca ===
On 19 January 2020, Maldonado joined Liga MX club Pachuca on a year–long loan, with an option to buy once six months had passed. He made his debut the following 28 January in a 3–1 (4–2 on aggregate) round of 16 win against Venados in the Copa MX.

=== Everton ===
On 9 September, Maldonado was loaned out to Chilean Primera División side Everton de Viña del Mar for six months after Pachuca and Motagua agreed to extend Maldonado's loan until July 2021. He didn't make his first appearance until the following 10 December, coming off the bench in a 3–1 home victory against Curicó Unido. He scored his first and only goal for Everton on 21 October 2021, the equalizer in a 1–1 draw with Ñublense.

=== Los Angeles FC ===
On 22 December 2022, Maldonado joined MLS side Los Angeles FC for the 2023 season on loan with an option to buy.

=== Universitatea Craiova ===
On 9 January 2024, Maldonado joined Liga I club Universitatea Craiova on loan until 31 December 2024 for a rumoured fee of €200,000, with an option to buy.

=== Rubin Kazan ===
On 10 July 2025, Maldonado signed a four-year contract with Rubin Kazan in Russia.

== International career ==
=== Under-17 ===
Maldonado represented Honduras at the 2015 FIFA U-17 World Cup in Chile.

=== Under-20 ===
Maldonado played with the Honduras U-20 at the 2018 Central American and Caribbean Games in Colombia. He played in all five games and scored a goal against Trinidad and Tobago.

=== Under 23 ===
On 23 July 2019, Maldonado was selected to represent Honduras at the 2019 Pan American Games in Lima, Peru. He captained the team throughout the tournament and sent Honduras to the final after converting the decisive penalty in a penalty shoot-out against Mexico. He played in the gold medal match as Honduras lost 4–1 to Argentina.

=== Senior ===
He made his debut for senior national team on 5 September 2019 in a friendly against Puerto Rico, as a starter.

== Personal life ==
On 14 February 2017, Denil's older brother Alex Maldonado was murdered inside a public transit bus in Tegucigalpa.

== Career statistics ==
=== Club ===
As of match played 21 November 2026

Appearances and goals by club, season and competition
Club	Season	League			National cup (Note: Includes Copa MX, Copa Chile, Cupa României)		Continental		Total	
Club	Season	Division	Apps	Goals	Apps	Goals	Apps	Goals	Apps	Goals
Motagua	2015–16	Liga Nacional	1	0	0	0	0 (Note: Appearances in CONCACAF Champions League)	0	1	0
Motagua	2016–17	Liga Nacional	4	0	0	0	—		4	0
Motagua	2017–18	Liga Nacional	2	0	0	0	1	0	3	0
Motagua	2018–19	Liga Nacional	42	1	—		7 (Note: Appearances in CONCACAF League)	0	49	1
Motagua	2019–20	Liga Nacional	11	1	—		8	1	19	2
Motagua	2021–22	Liga Nacional	20	1	—		2	0	22	1
Motagua	2022–23	Liga Nacional	19	1	—		5	0	14	1
Motagua	Total		99	4	0	0	23	1	122	5
Pachuca (loan)	2019–20	Liga MX	0	0	3	0	—		3	0
Pachuca (loan)	2020–21	Liga MX	0	0	0	0	—		0	0
Pachuca (loan)	Total		0	0	3	0	—		3	0
CD Everton (loan)	2020	Chilean Primera División	4	0	0	0	—		4	0
CD Everton (loan)	2021	Chilean Primera División	15	1	2	0	—		17	1
CD Everton (loan)	Total		19	1	2	0	—		21	1
Los Angeles FC (loan)	2023	Major League Soccer	21	1	0	0	4 (Note: Three appearances in CONCACAF Champions League and one appearance in Leagues Cup)	0	25	1
Universitatea Craiova (loan)	2023–24	Liga I	13	2	1	0	—		14	2
Universitatea Craiova (loan)	2024–25	Liga I	35	4	2	0	1 (Note: Appearance in UEFA Conference League)	0	38	4
Universitatea Craiova (loan)	Total		48	6	3	0	1	0	52	6
Rubin Kazan	2025–26	Russian Premier League	9	0	0	0	—		9	0
Rubin Kazan	2026–27	Russian Premier League	10	0	2	0	—		12	0
Rubin Kazan	Total		19	0	2	0	0	0	21	0
Career total			206	12	10	0	28	1	244	13

=== International ===
As of match played 17 November 2026

National team	Year	Apps	Goals
Honduras	2019	4	0
Honduras	2020	1	0
Honduras	2021	4	0
Honduras	2022	13	0
Honduras	2023	8	1
Honduras	2024	6	0
Honduras	2025	6	0
Honduras	2026	5	0
Total		48	1

Scores and results list Honduras' goal tally first, score column indicates score after each Maldonado goal.

List of international goals scored by Bryan Róchez
No.	Date	Venue	Opponent	Score	Result	Competition
1	15 October 2023	Estadio Nacional Chelato Uclés, Tegucigalpa, Honduras	Cuba	1–0	4–0	2023–24 CONCACAF Nations League

== Honours ==
Motagua

- Liga Nacional: 2016–17 A, 2016–17 C, 2018–19 A, 2018–19 C, 2021–22 C
- Honduran Supercup: 2017
- CONCACAF League runner-up: 2018, 2019

CD Everton

- Copa Chile runner-up: 2021

Los Angeles FC

- MLS Cup runner-up: 2023
- CONCACAF Champions League runner-up: 2023

Honduras U20

- CONCACAF U-20 Championship runner-up: 2017

Honduras Olympic

- Pan American Games runner-up: 2019

Individual

- CONCACAF Men's Olympic Qualifying Tournament Best XI: 2020
