= Óscar Salas =

Honduran footballer (born 1993)

Personal information
- Full name: Óscar Leonel Salas Miranda
- Date of birth: 8 December 1993 (age 32)
- Place of birth: Olanchito, Honduras
- Height: 1.72 m (5 ft 8 in)
- Position: Midfielder

Team information
- Current team: C.D. Honduras Progreso

Senior career*
Years	Team	Apps	(Gls)
2012–2018	Olimpia	98	(10)
2019	Juticalpa	20	(8)
2019	Motagua	10	(0)
2020	C.D.S. Vida		
2021-	C.D. Honduras Progreso		

International career^{‡}
2013	Honduras U-20	4	(1)
2016	Honduras U-23	8	(0)
2016–2017	Honduras	7	(1)
- * Club domestic league appearances and goals as of 8 December 2019 ‡ National team caps and goals as of 3 June 2018

Óscar Salas (born 8 December 1993) is a Honduran footballer. He represented Honduras in the football competition at the 2016 Summer Olympics. He currently plays for C.D. Honduras Progreso.

== International career ==
Salas got his first call up to the senior Honduras side for a friendly against Belize in October 2016.

=== International goals ===
Scores and results list Honduras' goal tally first.

Goal	Date	Venue	Opponent	Score	Result	Competition
1.	8 October 2016	FFB Field, Belmopan, Belize	Belize	2–1	2–1	Friendly
