= Henry Ayala =

Honduran footballer (born 1996)

Personal information
- Full name: Henry Arony Ayala Martínez
- Date of birth: 31 January 1996 (age 30)
- Place of birth: Danlí, Honduras
- Position: Defender

Senior career*
Years	Team	Apps	(Gls)
2017–2018	UPNFM	0	(0)
2018–2019	Juticalpa	18	(1)
2019	Motagua	1	(0)
2020–2021	Platense F.C.	13	(0)
- * Club domestic league appearances and goals as of 1 January 2022

Henry Arony Ayala Martínez (born 31 January 1996) is a Honduran professional footballer who plays for Platense F.C. of Honduran Liga Nacional. He plays as a midfielder and his current club is FC Motagua of the National League of Honduras. He was born in Danlí, Honduras.
