= Mauro Ortiz =

Argentine footballer

Personal information
- Full name: Mauro Gabriel Ortiz
- Date of birth: 27 September 1994 (age 32)
- Place of birth: La Plata, Argentina
- Height: 1.62 m (5 ft 4 in)
- Position: Forward

Team information
- Current team: Nueva Chicago
- Number: 20

Senior career*
| Years | Team | Apps | (Gls) |
| 2014–2015 | Berazategui | 52 | (10) |
| 2015–2018 | Deportivo Riestra | 67 | (19) |
| 2017–2018 | → Talleres (loan) | 13 | (0) |
| 2018– | Talleres | 18 | (2) |
| 2022 | → Patronato (loan) | 11 | (0) |
| 2022 | → Motagua (loan) | 9 | (1) |
| 2023–2024 | → Deportivo Riestra (loan) | 19 | (2) |
| 2024– | → Nueva Chicago (loan) | 20 | (1) |

International career
| 2016 | Argentina U23 | 2 | (0) |
- * Club domestic league appearances and goals as of 16:44, 20 June 2025 (UTC)

Mauro Gabriel Ortiz (born 27 September 1994) is an Argentine professional footballer who plays as a forward for Nueva Chicago on loan from Talleres.

== Club career ==
Ortiz began his senior career in Primera C with Berazategui, he stayed with the club for two seasons and scored ten times in fifty-two appearances. On 6 July 2015, Primera B Metropolitana's Deportivo Riestra signed Ortiz. He scored two goals during his first start on 24 August against Deportivo Español. In 2016–17, Ortiz netted seventeen goals in forty-two fixtures as Deportivo Riestra won promotion to Primera B Nacional. August 2017 saw Ortiz sign for Primera División side Talleres on loan. His first appearance came in a 1–0 loss to Patronato on 1 October, which preceded a further twelve matches in his opening season with them.

In mid-2018, Talleres signed Ortiz permanently. He scored on his next league appearance in August against Gimnasia y Esgrima, before netting again versus Newell's Old Boys in March 2019. The forward didn't feature in the subsequent 2019–20 campaign due to a number of injuries. In February 2022, Ortiz was loaned out to Patronato until the end of 2022. However, the spell was terminated before time, and on 8 August 2022, Ortiz instead joined Hondurian side F.C. Motagua on loan until June 2023.

== International career ==
In 2016, Ortiz was selected by the Argentina U23s for the 2016 Sait Nagjee Trophy. He featured in games against 1860 Munich II and Shamrock Rovers.

== Career statistics ==
As of 26 October 2020.

Club statistics
| Club | Season | League | | | Cup | | League Cup | | Continental | | Other | | Total | |
| Club | Season | Division | Apps | Goals | Apps | Goals | Apps | Goals | Apps | Goals | Apps | Goals | Apps | Goals |
|---|---|---|---|---|---|---|---|---|---|---|---|---|---|---|
| Deportivo Riestra | 2015 | Primera B Metropolitana | 16 | 2 | 0 | 0 | — | | — | | 0 | 0 | 16 | 2 |
| Deportivo Riestra | 2016 | Primera B Metropolitana | 14 | 3 | 0 | 0 | — | | — | | 0 | 0 | 14 | 3 |
| Deportivo Riestra | 2016–17 | Primera B Metropolitana | 37 | 14 | 1 | 1 | — | | — | | 4 (Note: Appearance(s) in the Primera B Metropolitana play-offs) | 2 | 42 | 17 |
| Deportivo Riestra | 2017–18 | Primera B Nacional | 0 | 0 | 0 | 0 | — | | — | | 0 | 0 | 0 | 0 |
| Deportivo Riestra | Total | | 67 | 19 | 1 | 1 | — | | — | | 4 | 2 | 72 | 22 |
| Talleres (loan) | 2017–18 | Primera División | 13 | 0 | 0 | 0 | — | | — | | 0 | 0 | 13 | 0 |
| Talleres | 2018–19 | Primera División | 11 | 2 | 3 | 0 | 3 | 0 | 0 | 0 | 0 | 0 | 17 | 2 |
| Talleres | 2019–20 | Primera División | 0 | 0 | 0 | 0 | 0 | 0 | — | | 0 | 0 | 0 | 0 |
| Talleres | Total | | 24 | 2 | 3 | 0 | 3 | 0 | 0 | 0 | 0 | 0 | 30 | 2 |
| Career total | | | 91 | 21 | 4 | 1 | 3 | 0 | 0 | 0 | 4 | 2 | 102 | 24 |
