= Fabricio Brener =

Argentine footballer

Fabricio Marcelo Brener
Personal information
- Date of birth: 26 May 1998 (age 28)
- Place of birth: Córdoba, Argentina
- Height: 1.71 m (5 ft 7 in)
- Position: Winger

Team information
- Current team: 2 de Mayo
- Number: 30

Youth career
- Belgrano

Senior career*
Years	Team	Apps	(Gls)
2017–2018	Belgrano	16	(1)
2019	→ Villa Dálmine (loan)	16	(2)
2020–2022	→ PAS Giannina (loan)	47	(3)
2022	→ Motagua (loan)	12	(0)
2023	→ Nueva Chicago (loan)	9	(1)
2024	Marsaxlokk F.C.	4	(0)
2024	Panargiakos		
2025–	2 de Mayo	7	(0)
- * Club domestic league appearances and goals as of 13 August 2025

Fabricio Brener (born 26 May 1998) is an Argentine professional footballer who plays as a winger in 2 de Mayo of the Paraguayan Primera División.

== Career ==
Brener started off his first-team career with Belgrano of the Argentine Primera División. He made his professional debut on 25 August 2017 during a league loss at Banfield, which was followed by his first goal against Gimnasia y Esgrima in his sixth senior appearance. Brener was picked thirteen times in the 2017–18 season. In January 2019, Brener joined Primera B Nacional's Villa Dálmine on loan. He remained until 31 December, appearing sixteen times in all competitions across two campaigns whilst also netting two goals; both came in a 3–0 home victory with Deportivo Riestra on 21 September.

=== PAS Giannina (On Loan) ===
On 6 October 2020, Brener completed a loan move to Greek football with newly promoted Super League team PAS Giannina; he was assigned the number eight shirt. He debuted in a win away to Apollon Smyrnis on 21 October, coming on to replace Sandi Križman with fourteen minutes left. He made three further appearances off the bench, before making back-to-back starts in December against Lamia and Panathinaikos. On 14 March 2021 he scored his first goal for winning victory awaw against Asteras Tripolis in the season 2020–21 in Super League Greece.

== Career statistics ==
As of 28 May 2021.

Club statistics
Club	Season	League			Cup		League Cup		Continental		Other		Total	
Club	Season	Division	Apps	Goals	Apps	Goals	Apps	Goals	Apps	Goals	Apps	Goals	Apps	Goals
Belgrano	2017–18	Primera División	12	1	1	0	—		—		0	0	13	1
Belgrano	2018–19	Primera División	2	0	0	0	—		—		0	0	2	0
Belgrano	2019–20	Primera B Nacional	1	0	0	0	—		—		0	0	1	0
Belgrano	2020–21	Primera B Nacional	0	0	0	0	—		—		0	0	0	0
Belgrano	Total		15	1	1	0	—		—		0	0	16	1
Villa Dálmine (loan)	2018–19	Primera B Nacional	3	0	1	0	—		—		0	0	4	0
Villa Dálmine (loan)	2019–20	Primera B Nacional	12	2	0	0	—		—		0	0	12	2
Villa Dálmine (loan)	Total		15	2	1	0	—		—		0	0	16	2
PAS Giannina (loan)	2020–21	Super League	22	2	4	0	—		—		0	0	26	2
PAS Giannina (loan)	2021–22	Super League	22	1	0	0	—		—		0	0	22	1
PAS Giannina (loan)	Total		44	3	4	0	—		—		0	0	48	3
F.C. Motagua	2022	Liga Nacional de Fútbol Profesional de Honduras	0	0	0	0	—		—		0	0	0	0
Career total			74	6	6	0	—		—		0	0	80	6
