= Marcelo Canales =

Honduran footballer (born 1991)

Personal information
- Full name: Jesús Marcelo Canales Cálix
- Date of birth: 6 January 1991 (age 35)
- Place of birth: La Ceiba, Honduras
- Height: 1.80 m (5 ft 11 in)
- Position: Midfielder

Team information
- Current team: Motagua

Youth career
- Vida

Senior career*
Years	Team	Apps	(Gls)
2012–2016	Vida	87	(8)
2016–2019	Olimpia	36	(2)
2019	Vida	34	(5)
2020	Motagua	3	(0)

International career^{‡}
2017–	Honduras	8	(1)
- * Club domestic league appearances and goals as of 22 August 2020 ‡ National team caps and goals as of 11 October 2017

Marcelo Canales (born 6 January 1991), is a Honduran professional footballer who most recently played as a midfielder for F.C. Motagua.
