= Carlos Meléndez (footballer, born 1997) =

Honduran footballer (born 1997)

Personal information
- Full name: Carlos Eduardo Meléndez Rosales
- Date of birth: 8 December 1997 (age 28)
- Place of birth: La Ceiba, Honduras
- Height: 1.89 m (6 ft 2 in)
- Position: Defender

Team information
- Current team: Motagua
- Number: 3

Senior career*
Years	Team	Apps	(Gls)
2018–2021	Vida	90	(14)
2021–	Motagua	18	(3)

International career^{‡}
2021	Honduras U23	5	(0)
2021–	Honduras	5	(0)
- * Club domestic league appearances and goals as of 10 August 2022 ‡ National team caps and goals as of 10 August 2022

Carlos Eduardo Meléndez Rosales (born 8 December 1997) is a Honduran professional footballer who plays as a defender for F.C. Motagua in the Honduran Liga Nacional and the Honduras national team.

== Club career ==
Meléndez made his professional debut with Vida in a 0–0 Liga Nacional tie with C.D. Marathón on 28 July 2018.

== International career ==
He represented Honduras at the 2020 Olympics.

He made his debut for Honduras national football team on 12 November 2021 in a World Cup qualifier against Panama.

== Personal life ==
Carlos' brother, Denis Meléndez, is also a professional footballer.
