= Wesly Decas =

Honduran footballer (born 1999)

Personal information
- Full name: Wesly Roberto Decas
- Date of birth: 11 August 1999 (age 27)
- Place of birth: Cortés, Honduras
- Height: 1.76 m (5 ft 9 in)
- Positions: Left-back; centre-back

Team information
- Current team: Real España

Youth career
- UNAH
- Motagua
- Atlético Independiente

Senior career*
Years	Team	Apps	(Gls)
2017–2019	FC Moravia	0	(0)
2017–2018	→ Juárez (loan)	1	(0)
2018	→ Nacional (loan)	2	(0)
2019	→ Atlanta United 2 (loan)	24	(1)
2020–2024	Motagua	134	(1)
2024–2025	Hapoel Ra'anana	24	(0)
2025–	Real España	0	(0)

International career^{‡}
2015	Honduras U17	2	(0)
2017–2019	Honduras U20	18	(0)
2021	Honduras U23	8	(0)
2022–	Honduras	10	(0)
- * Club domestic league appearances and goals as of 1 June 2025 ‡ National team caps and goals as of 16 June 2024

Wesly Roberto Decas (born 11 August 1999) is a Honduran professional footballer who plays as a defender for Liga Nacional club Real España.

== Club career ==
=== Motagua Reserves, Atletico Independiente, and club trials ===
Decas started his career by signing with F.C. Motagua. He played for the reserve team until he was signed by Atlético Independiente. Impressing internationally with the U-20s at the 2017 CONCACAF U-20 Championship and the 2017 FIFA U-20 World Cup, he was offered trials with English Premier League team Liverpool F.C. and Dutch Eredivisie team PSV Eindhoven.

=== FC Juárez ===
On 29 August 2017, Decas signed with Mexican team FC Juárez in the Ascenso MX on a season long loan. He made his debut on 10 January 2018 in a 3–1 win against Lobos BUAP in the Copa MX.

=== C.D. Nacional ===
On 22 July 2018, Portuguese Primeira Liga team C.D. Nacional announced the signing of Decas on a two–year loan. Decas made his debut in a 2–1 against Vitória Setúbal on 26 August 2018. He played alongside fellow countryman Bryan Róchez and was even invited by Róchez to meet his family. On 24 January 2019, Decas terminated his contract with Nacional saying, "I left because I wasn't playing and that affected me."

=== Atlanta United 2 ===
On 15 February 2019, Atlanta United 2 announced the loan signing of Decas for the 2019 season, with an option to buy. He made his debut coming on as a substitute for Florentin Pogba in a 2–0 away loss to Saint Louis FC.

== Career statistics ==
=== International ===
As of match played 16 June 2024

Appearances and goals by national team and year
National team	Year	Apps	Goals
Honduras	2022	6	0
Honduras	2023	–	
Honduras	2024	4	0
Total		10	0
