= 2007–08 C.D. Motagua season =

Motagua
2007–08 season
- Chairman: Pedro Atala
- Manager: Maradiaga, Pineda, and Clavasquín
- Apertura: Runner–up
- Clausura: 4th
- UNCAF Interclub Cup: Winners
- CONCACAF Champions' Cup: Quarterfinals
- Top goalscorer: League: Nascimento (10); All: Nascimento (14)
- Highest home attendance: 35,000~
Home colours	Away colours

In the 2007–08 season Motagua won their first international trophy in the 2007 UNCAF Interclub Cup, and were the league's runner-up in the Apertura tournament being beaten by C.D. Marathón. They were the only team to beat C.D. Victoria, doing so twice. In the Clausura tournament they reached the Semifinals. They also competed in the last CONCACAF Champions' Cup.

== Squad ==
=== Transfer in ===
Note: Flags indicate national team as defined under FIFA eligibility rules; some limited exceptions apply. Players may hold more than one non-FIFA nationality.

No.	Pos.	Nation	Player
2	DF	HON	Steven Morris (From Motagua B)
3	DF	COL	Santiago de Alba (From San Francisco)
4	DF	HON	Roy Posas (From Hispano)
7	MF	CRC	Steven Bryce (From Marathón)
15	MF	HON	Walter López (From Olimpia)
18	MF	PAN	José Justavino (From San Francisco)

No.	Pos.	Nation	Player
19	MF	HON	Osman Chávez (From Platense)
20	MF	HON	Amado Guevara (From Chivas USA)
23	MF	HON	Daniel Facussé (From Motagua B)
29	MF	HON	José Rivera (From Motagua B)
30	MF	HON	Rubén Rivera (From Motagua B)
31	FW	HON	Luis Rodas (From Achuapa)

=== Transfer out ===
Note: Flags indicate national team as defined under FIFA eligibility rules; some limited exceptions apply. Players may hold more than one non-FIFA nationality.

No.	Pos.	Nation	Player
3	DF	HON	Javier Martínez (To Vida)
7	MF	CRC	Steven Bryce (Free agent)
7	FW	HON	Saúl Martínez (Released)
13	MF	HON	Víctor Mena (Released)
13	MF	HON	José Grant (To Victoria)
16	MF	HON	Edy Vásquez (Died)

No.	Pos.	Nation	Player
20	MF	HON	Amado Guevara (To Toronto FC)
23	MF	BRA	Pedro Santana (Retired)
–	MF	HON	Juan Tablada (Released)
–	MF	HON	Marvin Paz (Released)
–	MF	HON	Meylin Soto (Retired)

No.	Pos.	Player name	Date of birth and age
1	GK	(Honduras) Ricardo Canales	30 May 1982 (aged 25)
2	DF	(Honduras) Steven Morris	14 April 1986 (aged 21)
3	DF	(Honduras) Javier Martínez	6 December 1971 (aged 35)
4	DF	(Honduras) Roy Posas	14 March 1984 (aged 23)
5	DF	(Honduras) Milton Reyes	2 May 1974 (aged 33)
6	DF	(Honduras) Óscar Bernárdez	30 December 1983 (aged 23)
7	MF	(Costa Rica) Steven Bryce	16 August 1977 (aged 29)
8	MF	(Honduras) Miguel Castillo	30 September 1983 (aged 23)
9	FW	(Honduras) Jairo Martínez	14 May 1978 (aged 29)
10	FW	(Brazil) Jocimar Nascimento	18 January 1979 (aged 28)
11	FW	(Uruguay) Óscar Torlacoff	22 December 1973 (aged 33)
12	MF	(Honduras) Rubén Matamoros	19 August 1982 (aged 24)
13	MF	(Honduras) José Grant	8 April 1983 (aged 24)
14	MF	(Honduras) Luis Guzmán	19 December 1980 (aged 26)
15	MF	(Honduras) Walter López	1 September 1977 (aged 29)
17	MF	(Honduras) Fernando Castillo	11 December 1984 (aged 22)
19	DF	(Honduras) Osman Chávez	29 July 1984 (aged 22)
20	MF	(Honduras) Amado Guevara	2 May 1976 (aged 31)
21	DF	(Honduras) Emilio Izaguirre	10 May 1986 (aged 21)
22	GK	(Honduras) Donaldo Morales	13 October 1982 (aged 24)
23	FW	(Brazil) Pedro Santana	8 February 1973 (aged 34)
24	DF	(Honduras) Víctor Bernárdez	24 May 1982 (aged 25)
25	GK	(Honduras) Rony García	13 November 1982 (aged 24)
26	DF	(Honduras) David Molina	14 March 1988 (aged 19)
27	FW	(Honduras) Jefferson Bernárdez	27 March 1987 (aged 20)
28	DF	(Honduras) Óscar García	10 January 1980 (aged 27)
29	FW	(Honduras) José Rivera	11 July 1988 (aged 18)
30	MF	(Honduras) Rubén Rivera	18 May 1987 (aged 20)
31	FW	(Honduras) Luis Rodas	3 January 1985 (aged 22)
32	MF	(Honduras) Jorge Claros	8 January 1986 (aged 21)
33	DF	(Honduras) Marlon Cruz	–
34	DF	(Honduras) Aarón Bardales	3 December 1985 (aged 21)
35	FW	(Honduras) José Valladares	16 July 1989 (aged 17)
36	MF	(Honduras) Kevin Osorio	12 July 1987 (aged 19)

== Apertura ==
Motagua played its first official game of the season at home with a 2–0 victory over Atlético Olanchano.

=== Standings ===
Pos	Team	Pld	W	D	L	GF	GA	GD	Pts	Qualification or relegation
1	Marathón	18	10	5	3	27	16	+11	35	Qualification to the Semifinals
2	Motagua	18	9	5	4	28	19	+9	32	Qualification to the Semifinals
3	Victoria	18	7	10	1	22	12	+10	31	Qualification to the Semifinals
4	Olimpia	18	6	9	3	19	13	+6	27	Qualification to the Semifinals
5	Deportes Savio	18	5	7	6	14	15	−1	22	

Updated to match(es) played on 25 November 2007. Source:

=== Matches ===
==== Results by round ====
Round	1	2	3	4	5	6	7	8	9	10	11	12	13	14	15	16	17	18
Ground	H	A	H	A	H	A	H	A	A	A	H	A	H	A	H	A	H	H
Result	W	L	W	D	W	W	L	L	D	W	D	D	W	L	D	W	W	W
Position	1	3	3	2	2	2	3	5	6	2	2	4	3	3	4	4	3	2

Updated to match(es) played on 2007-11-25. Source: 2007–08 Apertura
A = Away; H = Home; W = Win; D = Draw; L = Loss

==== Regular season ====
12 August 2007 Round 1	Motagua	2–0	Atlético Olanchano	Tegucigalpa
	Nascimento; Guevara			Attendance: 3,460

19 August 2007 Round 2	Hispano	2–1	Motagua	Comayagua
	Jiménez 35' 39'		Guevara 68'	Attendance: 3,722

26 August 2007 Round 3	Motagua	1–0	Deportes Savio	Tegucigalpa
	Rodas 57'			Attendance: 3,026

30 August 2007 Round 4	Vida	0–0	Motagua	La Ceiba
19:30				Attendance: 3,355

2 September 2007 Round 5	Motagua	4–1	Marathón	Tegucigalpa
16:00	Castillo 1'; Rodas 23'; Guevara 66'; Bernárdez 77'		Martínez 53'	Attendance: 5,541

4 October 2007 Round 6	Olimpia	1–2	Motagua	Tegucigalpa
19:30	Núñez 24'		López 7'; Nascimento 73'	Attendance: 17,799

15 September 2007 Round 7	Motagua	2–4	Real España	Tegucigalpa
19:30	Rodas 10'; Guevara 23'		Peña 1'; Fretes 44'; Ferreira 60' 87'	Attendance: 5,651

23 September 2007 Round 8	Platense	3–2	Motagua	Puerto Cortés
15:00	dos Santos 24' 75'; Zelaya 85'		Santana 52'; Rodas 70'	Attendance: 2,081

1 October 2007 Round 9	Victoria	2–2	Motagua	La Ceiba
	Solís 89' 90+3'		Nascimento 16'; Matamoros 84'	Attendance: 5,020

7 October 2007 Round 10	Atlético Olanchano	1–2	Motagua	Catacamas
	Salinas 15'		Torlacoff 25'; Nascimento 74'	Attendance: 3,082

16 October 2007 Round 11	Motagua	1–1	Hispano	Tegucigalpa
	Rodas 6'		Güity 40'	Attendance: 1,675

20 October 2007 Round 12	Deportes Savio	1–1	Motagua	Santa Rosa de Copán
	Róchez 60'		Santana 44'	Attendance: 3,850

27 October 2007 Round 13	Motagua	2–0	Vida	Tegucigalpa
19:30	Torlacoff 3' 4'			Attendance: 1,737

7 November 2007 Round 14	Marathón	1–0	Motagua	San Pedro Sula
19:30	Brown 23'			Attendance: 4,603

4 November 2007 Round 15	Motagua	0–0	Olimpia	Tegucigalpa
16:00				Attendance: 15,950

10 November 2007 Round 16	Real España	1–2	Motagua	San Pedro Sula
19:30	Valladares 58'		Martínez 70'; Nascimento 78'	Attendance: 1,945

18 November 2007 Round 17	Motagua	3–1	Platense	Tegucigalpa
16:00	Martínez 44'; Bryce 61'; Santana 82'		dos Santos 3'	Attendance: 2,050

25 November 2007 Round 18	Motagua	1–0	Victoria	Tegucigalpa
16:00	Nascimento 72'			Attendance: 5,014

==== Semifinals ====
1 December 2007 1st leg	Victoria	1–1	Motagua	La Ceiba
19:30	Rosales 20'		Guevara 2'	Attendance: 9,634; Referee: José Molina

9 December 2007 2nd leg	Motagua	2–0	Victoria	Tegucigalpa
16:00	Rodas 42'; Guevara 75'			Attendance: 11,899; Referee: Ricardo Zelaya

- Motagua won 3–1 on aggregate.

==== Final ====
16 December 2007 1st leg	Motagua	0–0	Marathón	Tegucigalpa
16:00				Attendance: 16,042; Referee: José Molina

22 December 2007 2nd leg	Marathón	2–0	Motagua	San Pedro Sula
19:30	Brown 1'; Scott 78'			Attendance: 26,596; Referee: Ricardo Zelaya

- Motagua lost 0–2 on aggregate.

== Clausura ==
Motagua reached the semifinals. The team had to play some of their home games at Estadio Marcelo Tinoco in Danlí due to major repairs to the Estadio Tiburcio Carías Andino for the 2010 World Cup qualification.

=== Standings ===
Pos	Team	Pld	W	D	L	GF	GA	GD	Pts	Qualification or relegation
2	Marathón	18	9	3	6	30	23	+7	30	Qualification to the Semifinals
3	Real España	18	8	4	6	26	22	+4	28	Qualification to the Semifinals
4	Motagua	18	8	3	7	23	19	+4	27	Qualification to the Semifinals
5	Hispano	18	7	5	6	24	25	−1	26	
6	Victoria	18	6	6	6	17	17	0	24	

Updated to match(es) played on 3 May 2008. Source:

=== Matches ===
==== Matches by round ====
Round	1	2	3	4	5	6	7	8	9	10	11	12	13	14	15	16	17	18
Ground	H	H	A	H	A	A	H	A	A	A	A	H	A	H	H	A	H	H
Result	W	W	W	D	L	D	W	L	L	L	L	W	L	D	W	L	W	W
Position	1	1	1	1	1	1	1	1	3	5	7	4	7	6	6	6	4	4

Updated to match(es) played on 2007-11-25. Source: 2007–08 Clausura
A = Away; H = Home; W = Win; D = Draw; L = Loss

==== Regular season ====
13 January 2008 Round 1	Motagua	2–0	Atlético Olanchano	Tegucigalpa
16:00	Torlacoff 64'; Rodas 90+4'			Attendance: 1,909

20 January 2008 Round 2	Motagua	2–0	Hispano	Tegucigalpa
16:00	Bernárdez 2'; Nascimento 74'			Attendance: 2,529

27 January 2008 Round 3	Olimpia	0–1	Motagua	Tegucigalpa
16:00			Nascimento 54'	Attendance: 11,934

30 January 2008 Round 4	Motagua	1–1	Victoria	Tegucigalpa
19:30	Nascimento 89'		Morán 30'	Attendance: 2,441

2 February 2008 Round 5	Marathón	2–1	Motagua	San Pedro Sula
19:30	de Vasconselos 68'; Ferreira 90+2'		Nascimento 50'	Attendance: 2,475

10 February 2008 Round 6	Deportes Savio	0–0	Motagua	Santa Rosa de Copán
				Attendance: 4,033

17 February 2008 Round 7	Motagua	2–1	Real España	Tegucigalpa
16:00	Torlacoff 73'; Rodas 79'		Caetano 87'	Attendance: 4,473

23 February 2008 Round 8	Vida	2–1	Motagua	La Ceiba
19:30	Hernández 12'; Cardozo 87'		Nascimento 90+1'	Attendance: 3,347

2 March 2008 Round 9	Platense	1–0	Motagua	Puerto Cortés
15:00	dos Santos 58'			Attendance: 3,793

8 March 2008 Round 10	Atlético Olanchano	1–0	Motagua	Catacamas
	Marín 78'			Attendance: 3,574

2 April 2008 Round 11	Hispano	2–0	Motagua	Comayagua
	Jiménez 30'; Morales 69'

16 March 2008 Round 12	Motagua	2–1	Olimpia	Tegucigalpa
16:00	Torlacoff 27'; Bernárdez 65'		Velásquez 32'	Attendance: 15,627

29 March 2008 Round 13	Victoria	2–0	Motagua	La Ceiba
	Chávez 60' 90'

6 April 2008 Round 14	Motagua	3–3	Marathón	Danlí
16:00	Guevara 36'; Izaguirre 76'; Torlacoff 90'		Furtado 47'; Mayorquín 59' da Silva 71'	Attendance: 4,716

13 April 2008 Round 15	Motagua	2–0	Deportes Savio	Danlí
	Castillo 16'; Nascimento 56'

19 April 2008 Round 16	Real España	2–1	Motagua	San Pedro Sula
19:30	Pavón 32' 81'		Nascimento 16'

27 April 2008 Round 17	Motagua	2–0	Vida	Danlí
15:00	Nascimento 44'; Castillo 90'			Attendance: 2,099

3 May 2008 Round 18	Motagua	3–1	Platense	Danlí
15:00	Torlacoff 6'; Valladares 9'; Bernárdez 21'		Córdova 4'	Attendance: 4,217

==== Semifinals ====
7 May 2008 1st leg	Motagua	1–4	Olimpia	Danlí
15:00	Matamoros 47'		Bruschi 21'; Thomas 49'; R. Núñez 54'; M. Núñez 76'	Attendance: 5,291; Referee: Mario Moncada

10 May 2008 2nd leg	Olimpia	3–1	Motagua	Comayagua
19:00	Turcios 19'; Bruschi 42'; Velásquez 62'		Nacimento 37'	Referee: Beningno Pineda

- Motagua lost 2–7 on aggregate.

== 2007 UNCAF Interclub Cup ==
As champions in the 2006–07 Apertura season, F.C. Motagua had the right to participate in the Central American club championship in 2007. Under the management of DT Ramón Maradiaga, the team achieved a record 7 wins and 1 drawn in a total of 8 games, and won their first international trophy.

=== Matches ===
==== First round ====
7 August 2007 1st leg	Real Estelí (Nicaragua)	0–2	(Honduras) Motagua	Estelí
			Matamoros 8'; Nascimento 76'	Attendance: 4,000; Referee: Gerald Henry (BLZ)

16 August 2007 2nd leg	Motagua (Honduras)	3–1	(Nicaragua) Real Estelí	Tegucigalpa
	Castillo 30'; Torlacoff 45'; Rodas 54'		Vega 86'	Attendance: 3,254; Referee: Elmer Bonilla (SLV)

- Motagua won 5–1 on aggregate.

==== Quarterfinals ====
18 September 2007 1st leg	Motagua (Honduras)	1–0	(Panama) San Francisco	Tegucigalpa
	Bryce 32'			Attendance: 2,515; Referee: Walter López (GUA) Starting XI: 22 – Morales; 7 – Bryce (substituted off) 67'; 11 – Torlacoff (substituted off) 75'; 17 – Castillo; 19 – Chávez; 20 – Guevara; 21 – Izaguirre; 24 – Bernárdez; 28 – García; 31 – Rodas; 32 – Claros; Substitutes; 12 – Matamoros (substituted in) 67'; 13 – Grant (substituted in) 75'

26 September 2007 2nd leg	San Francisco (Panama)	0–1	(Honduras) Motagua	La Chorrera
			Rodas 85'	Referee: Alexandro Jiménez (CRC)

- Motagua won 2–0 on aggregate.

==== Semifinals ====
23 October 2007 1st leg	Municipal (Guatemala)	1–3	(Honduras) Motagua	Guatemala City
	Ponciano 56'		Guevara 27' 86'; Nascimento 73'	Referee: Alexandro Jiménez (CRC)

30 October 2007 2nd leg	Motagua (Honduras)	3–2	(Guatemala) Municipal	Tegucigalpa
	Nascimento 10'; Chávez 41'; Bernárdez 65'		Ramírez 11'; Romero 36'	Attendance: 6,784; Referee: Roberto Moreno (PAN)

- Motagua won 6–3 on aggregate.

==== Final ====
28 November 2007 1st leg	Saprissa (Costa Rica)	1–1	(Honduras) Motagua	San José
	Alpízar 8'		García 49'	Referee: Carlos Batres (GUA) Starting XI: 22 – Morales; 7 – Bryce (substituted off) 46'; 10 – Nascimento; 14 – Guzmán (substituted off) 83'; 19 – Chávez; 20 – Guevara; 21 – Izaguirre; 24 – Bernárdez; 28 – García; 31 – Rodas (substituted off) 46'; 32 – Claros; Substitutes; 17 – Castillo (substituted in) 46'; 9 – Martínez (substituted in) 46'; 5 – Reyes (substituted in) 83'

5 December 2007 1st leg	Motagua (Honduras)	1–0	(Costa Rica) Saprissa	Tegucigalpa
	Nascimento 60'			Attendance: 34,254; Referee: Joel Aguilar (SLV)

- Motagua won 2–1 on aggregate.

== 2008 CONCACAF Champions' Cup ==
After winning the 2007 UNCAF Interclub Cup, F.C. Motagua obtained one of the three Central American tickets to the 2008 CONCACAF Champions' Cup. On 17 December 2008 CONCACAF announced the pairs for the Quarterfinals, leaving Motagua in the bracket against reigning champions C.F. Pachuca.

=== Matches ===
==== Quarterfinals ====
11 March 2008 1st leg	Motagua (Honduras)	0–0	(Mexico) Pachuca	Tegucigalpa
				Attendance: 35,846; Referee: Elmar Rodas (GUA)

19 March 2008 2nd leg	Pachuca (Mexico)	1–0	(Honduras) Motagua	Pachuca
	Montes 43'			Attendance: 33,000; Referee: Ricardo Salazar (USA) Starting XI: 22 – Morales; 4 – Posas; 5 – Reyes; 8 – Castillo; 11 – Torlacoff (substituted off) 56'; 18 – Justavino (substituted off) 41'; 19 – Chávez; 20 – Guevara; 21 – Izaguirre; 24 – Bernárdez; 32 – Claros (substituted off) 70'; Substitutes; 17 – Castillo (substituted in) 41'; 10 – Nascimento (substituted in) 56'; 31 – Rodas (substituted in) 70'

- Motagua lost 0–1 on aggregate.
