= 2006–07 C.D. Motagua season =

Motagua
2006–07 season
- Chairman: Pedro Atala
- Manager: Ramón Maradiaga
- Apertura: Champion
- Clausura: 4th
- Top goalscorer: Santana (14)
Home colours	Away colours

The 2006–07 C.D. Motagua season in the Honduran football league was divided into two tournaments, Apertura and Clausura. F.C. Motagua was able to win its 11th title in the Apertura tournament, giving them the chance to qualify to the 2007 UNCAF Interclub Cup.

== Apertura ==
After having achieved 31 points in 18 rounds, F.C. Motagua qualified to the Final round in which it faced Hispano F.C. With a 6–1 score on aggregate in favor, they advanced to the Final against city archrival Club Deportivo Olimpia. The "whites" moved their home match to San Pedro Sula, believing they would benefit from the fact that this city has very few Motagua fans; despite that, Motagua displayed one of the best games of the season with a 3–1 final score, and so ensured their eleventh national championship.

=== Squad ===
- All data is updated prior the beginning of the season.

No.	Pos.	Player	DoB	Caps	Goals
1	GK	(Honduras) Ricardo Canales	30 May 1982 (aged 24)	–	0
3	DF	(Honduras) Javier Martínez	6 December 1971 (aged 34)	–	–
9	FW	(Honduras) Jairo Martínez	14 May 1978 (aged 28)	–	–
10	FW	(Brazil) Jocimar Nascimento	18 January 1979 (aged 27)	0	0
11	FW	(Uruguay) Óscar Torlacoff	22 December 1973 (aged 32)	–	–
12	MF	(Honduras) Rubén Matamoros	19 August 1982 (aged 23)	–	–
14	DF	(Honduras) Luis Guzmán	19 December 1980 (aged 25)	–	–
21	MF	(Honduras) Emilio Izaguirre	10 May 1986 (aged 20)	–	–
23	FW	(Brazil) Pedro Santana	8 February 1973 (aged 33)	–	–
24	DF	(Honduras) Víctor Bernárdez	24 May 1982 (aged 24)	–	–
30	DF	(Honduras) Limber Pérez	26 July 1976 (aged 30)	–	–
32	MF	(Honduras) Jorge Claros	8 January 1986 (aged 20)	–	–
–	MF	(Honduras) Víctor Mena	2 August 1980 (aged 26)	–	–
–	MF	(Brazil) Diogo Fernandes	15 December 1985 (aged 20)	–	0

=== Standings ===
Pos	Team	Pld	W	D	L	GF	GA	GD	Pts	Qualification or relegation
1	Olimpia	18	10	5	3	26	14	+12	35	Qualified to the Final round
2	Motagua	18	9	4	5	27	22	+5	31	Qualified to the Final round
3	Hispano	18	7	9	2	25	14	+11	30	Qualified to the Final round
4	Marathón	18	8	6	4	30	20	+10	30	Qualified to the Final round
5	Platense	18	7	8	3	32	29	+3	29	

Updated to match(es) played on 26 November 2006. Source:

=== Matches ===
==== Results by round ====
Round	1	2	3	4	5	6	7	8	9	10	11	12	13	14	15	16	17	18
Ground	H	A	A	H	A	A	H	A	H	A	H	H	A	H	H	A	H	A
Result	L	D	L	W	L	W	W	W	W	L	W	W	D	D	W	D	W	L
Position	10	8	9	8	9	7	5	4	3	4	3	2	3	4	2	2	2	2

Updated to match(es) played on 2006-11-26. Source:
A = Away; H = Home; W = Win; D = Draw; L = Loss

==== Regular season ====
13 August 2006 Round 1	Motagua	1–3	Platense	Tegucigalpa, Francisco Morazán
16:00 (UTC−06)	Paz 14'		Mejía 37'; Romero 41'; Costly 70'	Stadium: Estadio Tiburcio Carías Andino

20 August 2006 Round 2	Hispano	0–0	Motagua	Comayagua, Comayagua
15:00 (UTC−06)				Stadium: Estadio Carlos Miranda

27 August 2006 Round 3	Marathón	4–0	Motagua	San Pedro Sula, Cortés
	W. Martínez 28' 79'; E. Martínez 75'; Ramírez 84'			Stadium: Estadio Olímpico Metropolitano

3 September 2006 Round 4	Motagua	2–1	Victoria	Tegucigalpa, Francisco Morazán
16:00 (UTC−06)	J.O. Martínez 16'; J.M. Martínez 89'		Pacini 37'	Stadium: Estadio Tiburcio Carías Andino

10 September 2006 Round 5	Olimpia	2–1	Motagua	Tegucigalpa, Francisco Morazán
16:00 (UTC−06)	Bernárdez 13' (o.g.); Velásquez 50'		Santana 31'	Stadium: Estadio Tiburcio Carías Andino

13 September 2006 Round 6	Broncos UNAH	3–5	Motagua	Choluteca, Choluteca
	Discua 10'; Bernárdez 56' (o.g.); Castillo 66'		Martínez 6' 60' 67'; Nascimento 14' 47'	Stadium: Estadio Fausto Flores Lagos

17 September 2006 Round 7	Motagua	2–0	Real España	Tegucigalpa, Francisco Morazán
16:00 (UTC−06)	Fernández 64'; Torlacoff 82'			Stadium: Estadio Tiburcio Carías Andino

23 September 2006 Round 8	Vida	0–2	Motagua	La Ceiba, Atlántida
19:30 (UTC−06)			Santana 19'; Rodas 30'	Stadium: Estadio Nilmo Edwards

1 October 2006 Round 9	Motagua	1–0	Atlético Olanchano	Tegucigalpa, Francisco Morazán
16:00 (UTC−06)	Santana 83'			Stadium: Estadio Tiburcio Carías Andino

4 October 2006 Round 10	Platense	2–1	Motagua	Puerto Cortés, Cortés
19:30 (UTC−06)	Costly 22'; Medina 83'		Martínez 90+3'	Stadium: Estadio Excélsior

15 October 2006 Round 11	Motagua	2–0	Hispano	Tegucigalpa, Francisco Morazán
16:00 (UTC−06)	Vásquez 15'; Nascimento 55'			Stadium: Estadio Tiburcio Carías Andino

22 October 2006 Round 12	Motagua	3–0	Marathón	Tegucigalpa, Francisco Morazán
16:00 (UTC−06)	Santana 45' 56'; Nascimento 60'			Stadium: Estadio Tiburcio Carías Andino

8 November 2006 Round 13	Victoria	1–1	Motagua	La Ceiba, Atlántida
	Morán 19'		Rodas 17'	Stadium: Estadio Nilmo Edwards

5 November 2006 Round 14	Motagua	2–2	Olimpia	Tegucigalpa, Francisco Morazán
16:00 (UTC−06)	Nascimento 8'; Santana 17'		Palacios 33'; Velásquez 64'	Stadium: Estadio Tiburcio Carías Andino

12 November 2006 Round 15	Motagua	1–0	Broncos UNAH	Tegucigalpa, Francisco Morazán
16:00 (UTC−06)	Torlacoff 59'			Stadium: Estadio Tiburcio Carías Andino; Attendance: 3,227; Referee: M. Muñoz

15 November 2006 Round 16	Real España	1–1	Motagua	San Pedro Sula, Cortés
19:30 (UTC−06)	Martínez 35'		Nascimento 43'	Stadium: Estadio Francisco Morazán

19 November 2006 Round 17	Motagua	2–0	Vida	Tegucigalpa, Francisco Morazán
16:00 (UTC−06)	Martínez 5'; Reyes 15'			Stadium: Estadio Tiburcio Carías Andino

26 November 2006 Round 18	Atlético Olanchano	3–0	Motagua	Catacamas, Olancho
15:00 (UTC−06)	Ferreira 22'; Salinas 65'; Godoy 81'			Stadium: Estadio Rubén Guifarro

==== Semifinals ====
3 December 2006 1st leg	Hispano	2–1	Motagua	Comayagua, Comayagua
	Diduch 24'; Castro 86'		Santana 27'	Stadium: Estadio Carlos Miranda; Referee: Marcio Carranza

7 December 2006 2nd leg	Motagua	5–0	Hispano	Tegucigalpa, Francisco Morazán
19:30 (UTC−06)	Torlacoff 10'; Martínez 17' 26'; Guzmán 36'; Santana 86' (pen.)			Stadium: Estadio Tiburcio Carías Andino; Attendance: 13,365

- Motagua 6–2 Hispano on aggregate.

==== Final ====
10 December 2006 1st leg	Motagua	1–1	Olimpia	Tegucigalpa, Francisco Morazán
16:00 (UTC−06)	Bernárdez 23'		Velásquez 11'	Stadium: Estadio Tiburcio Carías Andino; Attendance: 32,055; Referee: Ricardo Zelaya

17 December 2006 2nd leg	Olimpia	1–3	Motagua	San Pedro Sula, Cortés
16:00 (UTC−06)	Figueroa 21'		Bernárdez 39'; Nascimento 56'; Guzmán 90+1'	Stadium: Estadio Olímpico Metropolitano; Attendance: 38,256; Referee: Mario Moncada

- Motagua 4–2 Olimpia on aggregate.

== Clausura ==
With the title in their possession, F.C. Motagua were looking to repeat this performance for the Clausura tournament; in the Regular season, they exhibited a very irregular performance, but still made it to the Semifinals where they lost to Real C.D. España on 5 May 2007 1–4 on aggregate. Only one week later, Edy Vasquez, a permanent player in the Motagua's line-ups, died following a car crash in Tegucigalpa at the age of 23.

=== Squad ===
Note: Flags indicate national team as defined under FIFA eligibility rules; some limited exceptions apply. Players may hold more than one non-FIFA nationality.

No.	Pos.	Nation	Player
1	GK	HON	Ricardo Canales
2	MF	HON	Pedro Fernández
3	DF	HON	Javier Martinez
4	FW	HON	David Cárcamo
5	MF	HON	Milton Reyes
6	DF	HON	Óscar Bernárdez
7	DF	HON	Víctor Mena
9	FW	HON	Jairo Martínez
11	FW	URU	Óscar Torlacoff
12	MF	HON	Rubén Matamoros
13	MF	HON	José Grant
14	MF	HON	Luis Guzmán
15	MF	HON	Juan Tablada
16	MF	HON	Edy Vásquez
17	MF	HON	Fernando Castillo
18	DF	HON	Marvin Paz

No.	Pos.	Nation	Player
19	FW	HON	Saúl Martínez
21	DF	HON	Emilio Izaguirre
22	GK	HON	Donaldo Morales
23	MF	BRA	Pedro Santana
24	DF	HON	Víctor Bernárdez
25	GK	HON	Rony García
26	DF	HON	David Molina
27	FW	HON	Jefferson Bernárdez
29	FW	HON	Meilin Soto
30	DF	HON	Limber Pérez
31	FW	HON	Luis Rodas
32	MF	HON	Jorge Claros
33	DF	HON	Marlon Cruz
34	MF	HON	Aaron Bardales
35	MF	HON	René Moncada
36	MF	HON	Kevin Osorio

=== Standings ===
Pos	Team	Pld	W	D	L	GF	GA	GD	Pts	Qualification or relegation
2	Marathón	18	11	3	4	32	16	+16	36	Qualified to the Final round (Note: Top 4 qualify to the Final round.)
3	Olimpia	18	11	3	4	26	12	+14	36	Qualified to the Final round
4	Motagua	18	10	1	7	31	26	+5	31	Qualified to the Final round
5	Hispano	18	6	5	7	21	19	+2	23	
6	Platense	17	7	2	8	17	22	−5	23 (Note: The matches Platense vs Broncos UNAH and Victoria vs Atlético Olanchano from Round 18 were not played due to lack of interest.)	

Updated to match(es) played on 29 April 2007. Source:

=== Matches ===
==== Results by round ====
Round	1	2	3	4	5	6	7	8	9	10	11	12	13	14	15	16	17	18
Ground	A	H	A	A	H	H	A	A	H	H	A	H	H	A	A	H	H	A
Result	W	W	W	L	L	W	W	L	L	D	W	W	W	L	W	L	L	W
Position	1	1	1	2	3	3	2	3	3	3	4	3	3	3	4	4	4	4

Updated to match(es) played on 2007-04-29. Source:
A = Away; H = Home; W = Win; D = Draw; L = Loss

==== Regular season ====
14 January 2007 Round 1	Platense	0–3	Motagua	Puerto Cortés, Cortés
15:30 (UTC−06)			Torlacoff 26'; Martínez 64'; Castillo 84'	Stadium: Estadio Excélsior

21 January 2007 Round 2	Motagua	3–2	Vida	Catacamas, Olancho
	Raudales 71' (o.g.); Nascimento 82'; Martínez 88'		Costa 46'; Palacios 56'	Stadium: Estadio Rubén Guifarro; Attendance: 2,895; Referee: Marcio Carranza

28 January 2007 Round 3	Atlético Olanchano	1–2	Motagua	Catacamas, Olancho
	Ramos 51'		Reyes 59'; Torlacoff 70'	Stadium: Estadio Rubén Guifarro

31 January 2007 Round 4	Victoria	2–0	Motagua	La Ceiba, Atlántida
	Güity 41' ? ?'			Stadium: Estadio Nilmo Edwards

3 February 2007 Round 5	Motagua	0–1	Real España	Tegucigalpa, Francisco Morazán
16:00 (UTC−06)			Lalín 82'	Stadium: Estadio Tiburcio Carías Andino

11 February 2007 Round 6	Motagua	1–0	Broncos UNAH	Tegucigalpa, Francisco Morazán
16:00 (UTC−06)	Bernárdez 68'			Stadium: Estadio Tiburcio Carías Andino

18 February 2007 Round 7	Olimpia	1–2	Motagua	Tegucigalpa, Francisco Morazán
16:00 (UTC−06)	Morales 60'		Claros 10'; Torlacoff 80'	Stadium: Estadio Tiburcio Carías Andino

24 February 2007 Round 8	Hispano	3–1	Motagua	Comayagua, Comayagua
	Fernández 1' 23'; Diduch 68'		Bernárdez 86'	Stadium: Estadio Carlos Miranda

1 March 2007 Round 9	Motagua	3–4	Marathón	Tegucigalpa, Francisco Morazán
19:30 (UTC−06)	Santana 25'; Martínez 49'; Bernárdez 79'		Martínez 4'; Bryce 7' 45'; Scott 23'	Stadium: Estadio Tiburcio Carías Andino

4 March 2007 Round 10	Motagua	2–2	Platense	Tegucigalpa, Francisco Morazán
16:00 (UTC−06)	Torlacoff 48' 65'		Méndez 14'; Ramírez 25'	Stadium: Estadio Tiburcio Carías Andino

14 March 2007 Round 11	Vida	1–2	Motagua	La Ceiba, Atlántida
19:30 (UTC−06)	de Souza 9'		Nascimento 50'; Bernárdez 62'	Stadium: Estadio Nilmo Edwards

18 March 2007 Round 12	Motagua	5–1	Atlético Olanchano	Tegucigalpa, Francisco Morazán
16:00 (UTC−06)	Claros 21'; Santana 32' 56'; Izaguirre 70'; Martínez 82'		Ferreira 90+1'	Stadium: Estadio Tiburcio Carías Andino

22 March 2007 Round 13	Motagua	1–0	Victoria	Tegucigalpa, Francisco Morazán
19:30 (UTC−06)	Reyes 38'			Stadium: Estadio Tiburcio Carías Andino

31 March 2007 Round 14	Real España	2–1	Motagua	San Pedro Sula, Cortés
19:30 (UTC−06)	Pavón 7'; Ferreira 65'		Santana 38'	Stadium: Estadio Francisco Morazán

4 April 2007 Round 15	Broncos UNAH	1–4	Motagua	Choluteca, Choluteca
	Cabrera 54'		Nascimento 32' 73'; Santana 47'; Castillo 80'	Stadium: Estadio Fausto Flores Lagos

15 April 2007 Round 16	Motagua	0–4	Olimpia	Tegucigalpa, Francisco Morazán
16:00 (UTC−06)			Velásquez 16'; Palacios 48'; Navas 55'; Cárcamo 82'	Stadium: Estadio Tiburcio Carías Andino

22 April 2007 Round 17	Motagua	0–1	Hispano	Tegucigalpa, Francisco Morazán
16:00 (UTC−06)			Diduch 30'	Stadium: Estadio Tiburcio Carías Andino

29 April 2007 Round 18	Marathón	0–1	Motagua	San Pedro Sula, Cortés
15:00 (UTC−06)			Grant 67'	Stadium: Estadio Olímpico Metropolitano

==== Semifinals ====
2 May 2007 1st leg	Motagua	1–3	Real España	Tegucigalpa, Francisco Morazán
19:30 (UTC−06)	Santana 66' (pen.)		Pavón 12' 33' (pen.) 59'	Stadium: Estadio Tiburcio Carías Andino; Attendance: 10,634; Referee: Benigno Pineda

5 May 2007 2nd leg	Real España	1–0	Motagua	San Pedro Sula, Cortés
19:30 (UTC−06)	Pavón 17' (pen.)			Stadium: Estadio Francisco Morazán; Attendance: 8,899; Referee: Mario Moncada

- Motagua 1–4 Real España on aggregate.
