= 2008–09 C.D. Motagua season =

Motagua
2008–09 season
- Chairman: Pedro Atala
- Manager: Jaime de la Pava
- Apertura: 4th
- Clausura: 8th
- Copa Sudamericana: First stage
- Top goalscorer: Torlacoff (8)
Home colours	Away colours	Third colours

For the 2008–09 C.D. Motagua season, F.C. Motagua played in three competitions, the Apertura tournament, the Clausura, and they were also invited to the 2008 Copa Sudamericana.

== Apertura ==
The 2008–09 Apertura Motagua season was the fifty-third season of the Motagua professional football lifetime. Motagua were looking for the 12th championship. They also attended the 2008 Copa Sudamericana because of Deportivo Saprissa's withdrawal due to the match-day fixtures collide with CONCACAF Champions League's. For this season Motagua were full with families. Miguel Castillo and Fernando Castillo are brothers, Eleazar Padilla and Esdras Padilla are brothers, Rubén Antonio Rivera and José Carlos Rivera are brothers, Víctor Bernárdez, Jefferson Bernárdez and Oscar Bernárdez are cousins, Shannon Welcome and Georgie Welcome are cousins. Jaime de la Pava replaced Ramón Maradiaga after he left to coach Guatemala national football team. Edmilson da Silva Melo was cut off the team since he received an injury that would leave him out for the rest of the tournament. On 11 September Luis Rodas and Roy Posas were cut off the team due to indecent behavior under the influence of alcohol.

=== Squad ===
- The players in bold have senior international caps.

Note: Flags indicate national team as defined under FIFA eligibility rules; some limited exceptions apply. Players may hold more than one non-FIFA nationality.

No.	Pos.	Nation	Player
1	GK	HON	**Ricardo Canales**
2	DF	HON	Steven Morris
3	DF	URU	Guillermo Díaz
4	DF	HON	**Roy Posas**
5	MF	HON	**Reynaldo Tilguath** (VC)
6	DF	HON	**Óscar Bernárdez**
7	FW	HON	**Georgie Welcome**
8	MF	HON	**Miguel Castillo**
9	FW	HON	Shannon Welcome
10	FW	BRA	Jocimar Nascimento
11	FW	URU	Óscar Torlacoff
12	MF	HON	José Burgos
13	MF	HON	Ronald Martínez
14	MF	HON	Luis Guzmán
15	MF	BRA	Nilberto da Silva
17	MF	HON	Fernando Castillo
18	MF	HON	Meller Sánchez
19	DF	HON	Emilson Cruz
21	DF	HON	**Emilio Izaguirre**
22	GK	HON	**Donaldo Morales**

No.	Pos.	Nation	Player
23	MF	HON	Daniel Facussé
24	DF	HON	**Víctor Bernárdez** (C)
26	DF	HON	David Molina
27	FW	HON	Jefferson Bernárdez
28	DF	HON	Samir García
29	FW	HON	José Rivera
30	MF	HON	Rubén Rivera
31	FW	HON	**Luis Rodas**
32	MF	HON	**Jorge Claros** (VC)
33	DF	HON	Esdras Padilla
34	DF	HON	Aarón Bardales
35	FW	HON	José Valladares
36	MF	HON	Kevin Osorio
40	MF	HON	Víctor Zúniga
42	MF	HON	Milton Palacios
43	FW	HON	**Jairo Martínez**
–	GK	HON	Levon Smith
–	DF	HON	Víctor Mena
–	DF	HON	Eleazar Padilla
–	DF	HON	Carlos Pineda

==== Transfer in ====
Note: Flags indicate national team as defined under FIFA eligibility rules; some limited exceptions apply. Players may hold more than one non-FIFA nationality.

No.	Pos.	Nation	Player
3	DF	URU	Guillermo Díaz (From Juventud de Las Piedras)
5	MF	HON	Reynaldo Tilguath (From Olimpia)
7	FW	HON	Georgie Welcome (From Arsenal)
9	FW	HON	Shannon Welcome (From Arsenal)
12	MF	HON	José Burgos (From Olimpia)
15	DF	BRA	Nilberto da Silva (From Marathón)
18	MF	HON	Meller Sánchez (From Motagua B)

No.	Pos.	Nation	Player
19	MF	HON	Emilson Cruz (From Motagua B)
33	DF	HON	Esdras Padilla (From Hispano)
–	GK	HON	Levon Smith (From Arsenal)
–	DF	HON	Víctor Mena (From Hispano)
–	DF	HON	Eleazar Padilla (From Hispano)
–	DF	HON	Carlos Pineda (From Motagua B)

==== Transfer out ====
Note: Flags indicate national team as defined under FIFA eligibility rules; some limited exceptions apply. Players may hold more than one non-FIFA nationality.

No.	Pos.	Nation	Player
3	DF	COL	Santiago de Alba (To San Francisco)
5	DF	HON	Milton Reyes (Free agent)
12	MF	HON	Rubén Matamoros (To Hispano)
15	MF	HON	Walter López (To Platense)

No.	Pos.	Nation	Player
18	MF	PAN	José Justavino (To Arabe Unido)
19	DF	HON	Osman Chávez (To Platense)
32	FW	HON	Luis Rodas (To Suchitepéquez)

=== Standings ===
Pos	Team	Pld	W	D	L	GF	GA	GD	Pts	Qualification or relegation
1	Real España	18	10	6	2	33	18	+15	**38 (Note: Real España +2 points.)**	**Qualification to the Semifinals**
2	Marathón	18	9	5	4	26	20	+6	**32**	**Qualification to the Semifinals**
**3**	Motagua	**18**	**9**	**3**	**6**	**24**	**21**	**+3**	**30**	**Qualification to the Semifinals**
4	Olimpia	18	8	5	5	19	17	+2	**29**	**Qualification to the Semifinals**
5	Deportes Savio	18	8	5	5	24	19	+5	**28 (Note: Deportes Savio −1 point.)**	

=== Matches ===
==== Results by round ====
Round	1	2	3	4	5	6	7	8	9	10	11	12	13	14	15	16	17	18
Ground	A	H	A	H	A	H	A	H	H	H	A	H	A	H	A	H	A	A
Result	W	W	D	D	D	W	L	W	L	L	W	W	L	W	W	W	L	L

Source: Motagua
A = Away; H = Home; W = Win; D = Draw; L = Loss

==== Pre-season ====
21 June 2008 Friendly	**Motagua**	**0–0**	**Real Juventud**	Siguatepeque

28 June 2008 Friendly	**Hispano**	**2–2**	**Motagua**	Comayagua
	Isaula 24' ?'		Rodas 26'; Rivera

29 June 2008 Friendly	**Atlético Independiente**	**0–4**	**Motagua**	Siguatepeque
			Nascimento; Castillo; Valladares

2 July 2008 Friendly	**Motagua**	**3–0**	**San Isidro**	Danlí
	Tilguath; Posas

5 July 2008 Friendly	**Deportes Savio**	**0–2**	**Motagua**	Siguatepeque
			Torlacoff 22'; Castillo 63'

6 July 2008 Friendly	**Atlético Esperanzano**	**0–1**	**Motagua**	La Esperanza
			Nascimento 22'

9 July 2008 Friendly	**Real España**	**0–1**	**Motagua**	San Pedro Sula
			Sánchez

12 July 2008 Friendly	**Heneca**	**0–2**	**Motagua**	San Lorenzo
			Valladares; Welcome

13 July 2008 Friendly	**Nacaome All-Star**	**0–7**	**Motagua**	Nacaome
			Castillo; Torlacoff; Tilguath; Welcome da Silva

20 July 2008 Friendly	**Motagua (Honduras)**	**2–1**	**(Nicaragua) Ocotal**	Danlí
	Torlacoff 24'; Nascimento 63'		Isaula 90'

==== Regular season ====
26 July 2008 Round 1	**Victoria**	**0–4**	**Motagua**	La Ceiba
19:30			Rivera 25'; Torlacoff 31' 46'; Castillo 66'	Attendance: 3,355; Referee: Armando Castro
Note: Coach Jaime de la Pava made his official debut in front of the club.

31 July 2008 Round 2	**Motagua**	**2–1**	**Hispano**	Danlí
14:00	Torlacoff 6'; Arzú 73' (o.g.)		Cabecao 71'	Attendance: 1,363; Referee: José Sandoval

3 August 2008 Round 3	**Real Juventud**	**1–1**	**Motagua**	Santa Bárbara
14:00	Gómez 24'		Nascimento 56'	Attendance: 3,305; Referee: Ricardo Zelaya

6 August 2008 Round 4	**Motagua**	**0–0**	**Real España**	Danlí
14:00				Attendance: 2,090; Referee: José Molina

9 August 2008 Round 5	**Vida**	**1–1**	**Motagua**	La Ceiba
19:30	Vargas 21'		da Silva 29'	Attendance: 2,709; Referee: Geovanny Mendoza

11 September 2008 Round 6	**Motagua**	**2–0**	**Olimpia**	Tegucigalpa
19:30	Nascimento 54'; Welcome 72'			Attendance: 4,714; Referee: Benigno Pineda

23 August 2008 Round 7	**Marathón**	**4–0**	**Motagua**	San Pedro Sula
19:30	Norales 21'; Martínez 61'; Núñez 67'; Sabillón 80'			Attendance: 2,187; Referee: José Molina

24 September 2008 Round 8	**Motagua**	**1–0**	**Platense**	Tegucigalpa
19:30	Nascimento 60'			Attendance: 916; Referee: Mario Moncada

7 September 2008 Round 9	**Motagua**	**0–2**	**Deportes Savio**	Tegucigalpa
16:00			Núñez 38'; Róchez 68'	Attendance: 1,550; Referee: Ronald Hernández

15 September 2008 Round 10	**Motagua**	**0–4**	**Victoria**	Danlí
14:00			Cárcamo 11'; Morán 37' 90+1'; Weber 85'	Attendance: 1,330

21 September 2008 Round 11	**Hispano**	**1–3**	**Motagua**	Comayagua
17:00	Isaula 81'		Nascimento 10'; Torlacoff 83' 88'	Attendance: 2,248; Referee: Benigno Pineda

28 September 2008 Round 12	**Motagua**	**2–1**	**Real Juventud**	Siguatepeque
15:30	Tilguath 50'; Nascimento 66'		del Cid 21'	Attendance: 1,154; Referee: Marlon Muñoz

4 October 2008 Round 13	**Real España**	**3–2**	**Motagua**	San Pedro Sula
19:30	Medina 22' 25'; Ferreira 76'		Tilguath 28'; Molina 30'	Attendance: 5,436; Referee: Ricardo Zelaya

5 November 2008 Round 14	**Motagua**	**1–0**	**Vida**	Tegucigalpa
19:30	Molina 24'			Attendance: 1,675; Referee: Wilson Matute

2 November 2008 Round 15	**Olimpia**	**0–2**	**Motagua**	Tegucigalpa
16:00			Bernárdez 82'; Welcome 87'	Attendance: 10,760; Referee: Óscar Moncada

9 November 2008 Round 16	**Motagua**	**2–0**	**Marathón**	Tegucigalpa
16:00	Welcome 15'; Torlacoff 81'			Attendance: 4,836; Referee: Mario Moncada

16 November 2008 Round 17	**Platense**	**1–0**	**Motagua**	Puerto Cortés
15:00	Zepeda 27'			Attendance: 1,326

22 November 2008 Round 18	**Deportes Savio**	**2–1**	**Motagua**	Santa Rosa de Copán
15:00	Zepeda 30' 88'		Valladares 84'	Attendance: 1,920; Referee: José Molina

==== Semifinals ====
27 November 2008 1st leg	**Motagua**	**1–0**	**Marathón**	Tegucigalpa
19:30	Castillo 64'			Attendance: 7,112; Referee: Geovany Mendoza

3 December 2008 2nd leg	**Marathón**	**1–0**	**Motagua**	San Pedro Sula
19:30	Norales 57'			Attendance: 7,643; Referee: Óscar Moncada

- Marathón 1–1 Motagua on aggregate; Motagua eliminated due to lower position in the Regular season.

== Clausura ==
The 2008-09 Clausura F.C. Motagua season was the fifty-fourth season of the Motagua professional football lifetime. Motagua were looking for the 12th league championship. After finishing in semifinals they were looking to become champions next year by signing big names such as Amado Guevara, Ramón Núñez, Marvin Sánchez, Banny Lozano, Javier Portillo, Leonardo Isaula, bringing back Osman Chavez and signing the internationals Mario Jardel, Guillermo Santo and Alberto Blanco. Also they will be losing important starting players, Victor Bernardez, Miguel Castillo and Fernando Castillo. The club's idol, Amado Guevara, joined on a loan because of MLS break. In order to sign more foreign players, Motagua wanted to naturalize Óscar Torlacoff and/or not enroll Nilberto da Silva because of his injury that leaves him off for half of the season.

=== Squad ===
- The players in bold have senior international caps.

Note: Flags indicate national team as defined under FIFA eligibility rules; some limited exceptions apply. Players may hold more than one non-FIFA nationality.

No.	Pos.	Nation	Player
1	GK	HON	**Ricardo Canales** (VC)
2	DF	HON	Steven Morris
3	DF	URU	Guillermo Díaz
4	DF	HON	Johnny Leverón
5	MF	HON	**Reynaldo Tilguath** (VC)
6	DF	HON	**Leonardo Isaula**
7	FW	HON	**Georgie Welcome**
8	MF	HON	**Miguel Castillo**
9	FW	HON	Shannon Welcome
10	FW	BRA	Jocimar Nascimento
11	FW	URU	Óscar Torlacoff
12	MF	HON	José Burgos
13	MF	HON	Ronald Martínez
14	MF	HON	Luis Guzmán
17	MF	HON	Fernando Castillo
18	MF	HON	Meller Sánchez
19	DF	HON	Emilson Cruz
20	MF	HON	**Amado Guevara** (C)
21	DF	HON	**Emilio Izaguirre**
22	GK	HON	**Donaldo Morales**
23	MF	HON	Daniel Facussé

No.	Pos.	Nation	Player
26	DF	HON	David Molina
27	FW	HON	Jefferson Bernárdez
29	MF	ARG	Guillermo Santo
30	MF	HON	Rubén Rivera
32	MF	HON	**Jorge Claros**
33	DF	HON	Esdras Padilla
34	DF	HON	Aarón Bardales
35	FW	HON	José Valladares
36	MF	HON	Javier Portillo
40	MF	HON	Víctor Zúniga
42	MF	HON	Milton Palacios
43	FW	HON	**Jairo Martínez**
44	MF	HON	**Marvin Sánchez**
–	FW	HON	José Rivera
–	MF	HON	Kevin Osorio
–	GK	HON	Levon Smith
–	DF	HON	Víctor Mena
–	DF	HON	Eleazar Padilla
–	DF	HON	Carlos Pineda
–	DF	BRA	Nilberto da Silva

==== Transfer in ====
Note: Flags indicate national team as defined under FIFA eligibility rules; some limited exceptions apply. Players may hold more than one non-FIFA nationality.

No.	Pos.	Nation	Player
4	DF	HON	Johnny Leverón (Free agent)
6	MF	HON	Leonardo Isaula (From Hispano)
20	MF	HON	Amado Guevara (From Toronto FC)

No.	Pos.	Nation	Player
29	MF	ARG	Guillermo Santo (From Chacarita Juniors)
36	MF	HON	Javier Portillo (From Hispano)
44	MF	HON	Marvin Sánchez (From Platense)

==== Transfer out ====
Note: Flags indicate national team as defined under FIFA eligibility rules; some limited exceptions apply. Players may hold more than one non-FIFA nationality.

No.	Pos.	Nation	Player
6	DF	HON	Óscar Bernárdez (To Vida)
24	DF	HON	Víctor Bernárdez (To Anderlecht)

No.	Pos.	Nation	Player
28	DF	HON	Samir García (To Motagua B)

=== Standings ===
Pos	Team	Pld	W	D	L	GF	GA	GD	Pts
6	Deportes Savio	18	5	5	8	17	21	−4	**20**
7	Real Juventud	18	4	7	7	15	21	−6	**19**
**8**	Motagua	**18**	**4**	**7**	**7**	**13**	**21**	**−8**	**19**
9	Platense	17	4	6	7	20	26	−6	**18 (Note: The match between Platense and Hispano from Round 18 was not played due to lack of interest.)**
10	Hispano	17	3	2	12	18	37	−19	**11**

Updated to match(es) played on 2 May 2009. Source:

=== Matches ===
==== Pre-season ====
28 December 2008 Friendly	**Hispano**	**1–2**	**Motagua**	Comayagua
14:00	Membreño		Burgos; Bernárdez

28 December 2008 Friendly	**Hispano**	**1–4**	**Motagua**	Comayagua
16:00	Ruiz		Nascimento; Welcome

==== Regular season ====
11 January 2009 Round 1	**Motagua**	**0–0**	**Real Juventud**	Tegucigalpa
16:00				Attendance: 3,157; Referee: Luis Flores

18 January 2009 Round 2	**Deportes Savio**	**0–0**	**Motagua**	Santa Rosa de Copán
14:00				Attendance: 1,542; Referee: Miguel Torres

25 January 2009 Round 3	**Motagua**	**1–0**	**Hispano**	Comayagua
16:00	Torlacoff 89' (pen.)			Attendance: 2,637; Referee: Armando Castro

1 February 2009 Round 4	**Vida**	**0–0**	**Motagua**	La Ceiba
15:30				Attendance: 2,594; Referee: José Molina

8 February 2009 Round 5	**Motagua**	**1–0**	**Real España**	Tegucigalpa
16:00	Welcome 67'			Attendance: 3,778; Referee: Óscar Moncada

15 February 2009 Round 6	**Olimpia**	**1–0**	**Motagua**	Tegucigalpa
16:00	Thomas 76' (pen.)			Attendance: 9,463; Referee: José Molina

22 February 2009 Round 7	**Motagua**	**0–1**	**Marathón**	Tegucigalpa
16:00			Palacios 55'	Attendance: 2,798

25 February 2009 Round 8	**Platense**	**4–3**	**Motagua**	Puerto Cortés
19:30	Lozano 15' (pen.); Ramírez 38' 45'; Ruiz 63'		Cruz 5'; Torlacoff 35' (pen.); Welcome 75'	Attendance: 1,287

1 March 2009 Round 9	**Victoria**	**1–1**	**Motagua**	La Ceiba
15:00	Morán 75'		Welcome 72'	Attendance: 1,662

8 March 2009 Round 10	**Real Juventud**	**1–1**	**Motagua**	Santa Bárbara
14:00	Córdoba 78'		Molina 45'	Attendance: 1,159

11 March 2009 Round 11	**Motagua**	**0–2**	**Deportes Savio**	Tegucigalpa
16:00			Díaz 81' (o.g.); Costa 87'	Attendance: 1,281

14 March 2009 Round 12	**Hispano**	**1–2**	**Motagua**	Tegucigalpa
19:30	Díaz 86' (o.g.)		Welcome 6'; Isaula 65'	Attendance: 1,137

22 March 2009 Round 13	**Motagua**	**0–0**	**Vida**	Tegucigalpa
16:00				Attendance: 1,659; Referee: Geovanny Mendoza

4 April 2009 Round 14	**Real España**	**0–0**	**Motagua**	San Pedro Sula
19:30				Attendance: 2,133; Referee: Benigno Pineda

16 April 2009 Round 15	**Motagua**	**0–1**	**Olimpia**	Tegucigalpa
16:00			Calderón 70'	Attendance: 7,358; Referee: Mario Moncada

19 April 2009 Round 16	**Marathón**	**6–3**	**Motagua**	San Pedro Sula
18:00	Scott 20' 50'; Chávez 42'; Mejía 44'; Sabillón 67'; Núñez 85'		Lloyd 11'; Rivera 52'; Díaz 72'	Attendance: 3,246; Referee: Marlon Muñoz

26 April 2009 Round 17	**Motagua**	**1–0**	**Platense**	Tegucigalpa
15:30	Izaguirre 17'			Attendance: 1,930

2 May 2009 Round 18	**Motagua**	**0–3**	**Victoria**	Tegucigalpa
15:30			Güity 18'; Copete 32'; Discua 45'	Attendance: 859

== 2008 Copa Sudamericana ==
In June 2008 CONMEBOL announced the participation of F.C. Motagua in the 2008 Copa Sudamericana as invitee. At that time Motagua was the Central American team with the best performance achieved at the 2008 CONCACAF Champions' Cup and were not taking part in the next season.

=== Matches ===
==== First round ====
19 August 2008 1st leg	Arsenal (Argentina)	4–0	(Honduras) Motagua	Buenos Aires
20:30	Leguizamón 41' (pen.) 73'; Mosquera 76'; Sava 80'			Attendance: 3,000; Referee: Fernando Cabrera (URU) Starting XI: 22 – Morales; 2 – Bardales; 3 – Díaz; 4 – Posas; 5 – Tilguath; 15 – Da Silva; 11 – Torlacoff (substituted off) 85'; 17 – Castillo (substituted off) 72'; 19 – Cruz; 26 – Molina; 30 – Rivera; Substitutes; 13 – Palacios (substituted on) 72'; 10 – Nascimento (substituted on) 85'

4 September 2008 2nd leg	Motagua (Honduras)	1–2	(Argentina) Arsenal	Tegucigalpa
21:10	Nascimento 18'		Gómez 25'; Coria 78' (pen.)	Attendance: 22,000; Referee: Juan Soto (VEN) Starting XI: 22 – Morales; 2 – Bardales (substituted off) 46'; 3 – Díaz; 4 – Posas; 5 – Tilguath; 6 – Claros (substituted off) 81'; 8 – Castillo; 9 – Rodas (substituted off) 66'; 10 – Nascimento; 14 – Guzmán; 26 – Molina; Substitutes; 13 – Palacios (substituted on) 46'; 7 – Welcome (substituted on) 66'; 25 – Padilla (substituted on) 81'

- Motagua 1–6 Arsenal on aggregate.
