= 2007 UNCAF Interclub Cup =

Tournament details
- Dates: 7 August – 5 December
- Teams: 16 (from 7 countries)

Final positions
- Champions: (Honduras) Motagua (1st title)
- Runners-up: (Costa Rica) Saprissa
- Third place: (Guatemala) Municipal
- Fourth place: (Costa Rica) Alajuelense

Tournament statistics
- Matches played: 32
- Goals scored: 71 (2.22 per match)
- Top scorer: (Brazil) Nascimento (4 goals)

The 2007 UNCAF Interclub Cup was the 25th edition of the international club football competition held in the UNCAF region representing the seven nations of Central America. C.D. Motagua obtained their first regional title. This was the ninth year of the current format using the name UNCAF Interclub Cup. The tournament was also a qualifying event for the 2008 CONCACAF Champions' Cup. The top three finishers in the tournament qualified for the 2008 CONCACAF Champions' Cup. The official draw took place on June 19 in Guatemala. This was the last season in this format.

== Tournament Bracket ==
Round of 16
(Costa Rica)	Puntarenas	3	0	3
(Belize)	FC Belize	0	0	0
(Costa Rica)	Saprissa	5	0	5
(El Salvador)	Once Municipal	2	1	3
(Costa Rica)	Alajuelense	3	0	3
(El Salvador)	Isidro Metapán	0	0	0
(Honduras)	Real España	2	1	3
(Belize)	R. Conquerors	1	2	3
(Panama)	Tauro	1	0	1
(Guatemala)	Xelajú	0	1	1
(Nicaragua)	Real Madriz	0	0	0
(Guatemala)	Municipal	2	6	8
(Nicaragua)	Real Estelí	0	1	1
(Honduras)	Motagua	2	3	5
(Panama)	San Francisco	0	1	1
(Honduras)	Olimpia	0	0	0

Quarterfinals
(Costa Rica)	Puntarenas	1	1	2
(Costa Rica)	Saprissa	1	2	3
(Costa Rica)	Alajuelense	0	2	2
(Honduras)	Real España	0	2	2
(Guatemala)	Xelajú	1	1	2
(Guatemala)	Municipal	1	1	2
(Honduras)	Motagua	1	1	2
(Panama)	San Francisco	0	0	0

Semifinals
(Costa Rica)	Saprissa	1	1	2
(Costa Rica)	Alajuelense	0	1	1
(Guatemala)	Municipal	1	2	3
(Honduras)	Motagua	3	3	6

Final
(Costa Rica)	Saprissa	1	0	1
(Honduras)	Motagua	1	1	2

== Round of 16 ==
7 August 2007 1st leg	Puntarenas (Costa Rica)	3–0	Belize	Puntarenas, Costa Rica
	Bernard 26' (pen.); Sancho 72'; Barbosa 81'	Report		Stadium: Estadio Lito Pérez; Attendance: 1,600; Referee: René Guerrero (NCA)

16 August 2007 2nd leg	Belize	0–0	(Costa Rica) Puntarenas	Belize City, Belize
		Report		Stadium: MCC Grounds; Attendance: 1,300; Referee: Juan Guerra (GUA)

Puntarenas advance 3–0 on aggregate.

8 August 2007 1st leg	Saprissa (Costa Rica)	5–2	(El Salvador) Once Municipal	San Juan de Tibás, Costa Rica
	Arce 16'; Arrieta 51' 69'; Centeno 64'; Borges 90'	Report	5' Ávalos; 37' Hurtado	Stadium: Estadio Ricardo Saprissa Aymá; Referee: Walter López (GUA)

15 August 2007 2nd leg	Once Municipal (El Salvador)	1–0	(Costa Rica) Saprissa	Ahuachapán, El Salvador
	Martínez 87'	Report		Stadium: Estadio Simeón Magaña; Attendance: 1,500; Referee: Ricardo Zelaya (HON)

Saprissa advance 5–3 on aggregate.

9 August 2007 1st leg	Alajuelense (Costa Rica)	3–0	(El Salvador) Isidro Metapán	Alajuela, Costa Rica
	Solorzano 49'; Núñez 60', 72'	Report		Stadium: Estadio Alejandro Morera Soto; Referee: Rolando Vidal (PAN)

14 August 2007 2nd leg	Isidro Metapán (El Salvador)	0–0	(Costa Rica) Alajuelense	Metapán, El Salvador
		Report		Stadium: Estadio Jorge Calero Suárez; Referee: Carlos Batres (GUA)

Alajuelense advance 3–0 on aggregate.

8 August 2007 1st leg	Real España (Honduras)	2–1	(Belize) Revolutionary Conquerors	San Pedro Sula, Honduras
	Valladares 21'; Vallecilo 90+3'	Report	4' Serrano	Stadium: Estadio Francisco Morazán; Referee: Marlon Mejía (SLV)

14 August 2007 2nd leg	Revolutionary Conquerors (Belize)	2–1 (2–4 p)	(Honduras) Real España	Dangriga, Belize
	Serrano 15'; Kuylen 45+'	Report	27' Días	Stadium: Carl Ramos Stadium; Referee: Vinicio Mena (CRC)
	Penalties
	Cuylen (penalty scored); Nolberto (penalty missed); Simpson (penalty scored); Serrano (penalty missed)		(penalty scored) Días; (penalty scored) Fretes; (penalty scored) Morales; (penalty scored) Medina

Real España advance 4–2 on penalties.

8 August 2007 1st leg	Tauro (Panama)	1–0	(Guatemala) Xelajú	Panama City, Panama
	Palma 75'	Report		Stadium: Estadio Rommel Fernández; Attendance: 950; Referee: Alexandro Jiménez (CRC)

14 August 2007 2nd leg	Xelajú (Guatemala)	1–0 (4–2 p)	(Panama) Tauro	Quetzaltenango, Guatemala
	Godoy 10'	Report		Stadium: Estadio Mario Camposeco; Referee: Edgar Durán (CRC)
	Penalties
	Patterson (penalty scored); Cubero (penalty scored); Silva (penalty scored); Swisher (penalty scored)		(penalty scored) López; (penalty missed) Cubilla; (penalty scored) Quiroz; (penalty missed) Melo

Xelajú advance 4–2 on penalties.

9 August 2007 1st leg	Real Madriz (Nicaragua)	0–2	(Guatemala) Municipal	Estelí, Nicaragua
		Report	13' Figueroa; 73' Ávila	Stadium: Estadio Independencia; Referee: Evaristo Soriano (HON)

16 August 2007 2nd leg	Municipal (Guatemala)	6–0	(Nicaragua) Real Madriz	Guatemala City, Guatemala
	Ponciano 4'; Asprilla 22'; Acevedo 40'; León 61'; Marroquín 74'; Pappa 84'	Report		Stadium: Estadio Mateo Flores; Attendance: 2,500; Referee: Luis Rodríguez (PAN)

Municipal advance 8–0 on aggregate.

7 August 2007 1st leg	Real Estelí (Nicaragua)	0–2	(Honduras) Motagua	Estelí, Nicaragua
		Report	8' Matamoros; 76' Nascimento	Stadium: Estadio Independencia; Attendance: 4,000; Referee: Gerald Henry (BLZ)

16 August 2007 2nd leg	Motagua (Honduras)	3–1	(Nicaragua) Real Estelí	Tegucigalpa, Honduras
	Castillo 30'; Torlacoff 45'; Rodas 54'	Report	86' Vega	Stadium: Estadio Tiburcio Carías Andino; Attendance: 3,254; Referee: Elmer Bonilla (BLZ)

Motagua advance 5–1 on aggregate.

9 August 2007 1st leg	San Francisco (Panama)	0–0	(Honduras) Olimpia	La Chorrera, Panama
		Report		Stadium: Estadio Agustín Sánchez; Referee: Edgar Rodríguez (CRC)

15 August 2007 2nd leg	Olimpia (Honduras)	0–1	(Panama) San Francisco	Tegucigalpa, Honduras
		Report	11' Julio	Stadium: Estadio Tiburcio Carías Andino; Referee: Joel Aguilar (SLV)

San Francisco advance 1–0 on aggregate.

== Quarterfinals ==
19 September 2007 1st leg	Puntarenas (Costa Rica)	1–1	(Costa Rica) Saprissa	Puntarenas, Costa Rica
	Camacho 33'	Report	17' Centeno	Stadium: Estadio Lito Pérez; Attendance: 2,150; Referee: Roberto Moreno (PAN)

26 September 2007 2nd leg	Saprissa (Costa Rica)	2–1	(Costa Rica) Puntarenas	San Juan de Tibás, Costa Rica
	Solís 42'; Alonso 83'	Report	69' Gómez	Stadium: Estadio Ricardo Saprissa Aymá; Referee: Ricardo Zelaya (HON)

Saprissa advance 3–2 on aggregate.

20 September 2007 1st leg	Alajuelense (Costa Rica)	0–0	(Honduras) Real España	Alajuela, Costa Rica
		Report		Stadium: Estadio Alejandro Morera Soto; Attendance: 3,000; Referee: Carlos Batres (GUA)

27 September 2007 2nd leg	Real España (Honduras)	2–2 (4–5 p)	(Costa Rica) Alajuelense	San Pedro Sula, Honduras
	Ferreira 2'; Valladares 37'	Report	7' Núñez; 13' Myrie	Stadium: Estadio Francisco Morazán; Attendance: 4,973; Referee: Rolando Vidal (PAN)
	Penalties
	Caetano (penalty scored); Fretes (penalty scored); Valladares (penalty scored); Medina (penalty scored); Días (penalty missed)		(penalty scored) Viquez; (penalty scored) Núñez; (penalty scored) Oviedo; (penalty scored) Gabas; (penalty scored) Lara

Alajuelense advance 5–4 on penalties.

19 September 2007 1st leg	Xelajú (Guatemala)	1–1	(Guatemala) Municipal	Quetzaltenango, Guatemala
	Quiñónez 79'	Report	3' Ramírez	Stadium: Estadio Mario Camposeco; Referee: Wálter Quesada (CRC)

25 September 2007 2nd leg	Municipal (Guatemala)	1–1 (4–1 p)	(Guatemala) Xelajú	Guatemala City, Guatemala
	Ramírez 24'	Report	11' (pen.) Patterson	Stadium: Estadio Mateo Flores; Attendance: 6,000; Referee: Joel Aguilar (SLV)
	Penalties
	Ramírez (penalty scored); Acevedo (penalty scored); García (penalty scored); Thompson (penalty scored)		(penalty missed) Patterson; (penalty scored) Antonio; (penalty missed) Swisher

Municipal advance 4–1 on penalties.

18 September 2007 1st leg	Motagua (Honduras)	1–0	(Panama) San Francisco	Tegucigalpa, Honduras
	Bryce 32'	Report		Stadium: Estadio Tiburcio Carías Andino; Attendance: 2,515; Referee: Walter López (GUA)

26 September 2007 2nd leg	San Francisco (Panama)	0–1	(Honduras) Motagua	La Chorrera, Panama
		Report	85' Rodas	Stadium: Estadio Agustín Sánchez; Referee: Alexandro Jiménez (CRC)

Motagua advance 2–0 on aggregate.

== Semifinals ==
25 October 2007 1st leg	Saprissa (Costa Rica)	1–0	(Costa Rica) Alajuelense	San Juan de Tibás, Costa Rica
	Solís 45+'	Report		Stadium: Estadio Ricardo Saprissa Aymá; Attendance: 2,150; Referee: Walter López (GUA)

1 November 2007 2nd leg	Alajuelense (Costa Rica)	1–1	(Costa Rica) Saprissa	Alajuela, Costa Rica
	Martins 15'	Report	90' Alpízar	Stadium: Estadio Alejandro Morera Soto; Referee: Ricardo Zelaya (HON)

Saprissa advance 2–1 on aggregate and qualifies to the 2008 CONCACAF Champions' Cup

23 October 2007 1st leg	Municipal (Guatemala)	1–3	(Honduras) Motagua	Guatemala City, Guatemala
	Ponciano 56'	Report	27', 86' Guevara; 73' Nascimento	Stadium: Estadio Mateo Flores; Referee: Alexandro Jiménez (CRC)

30 October 2007 2nd leg	Motagua (Honduras)	3–2	(Guatemala) Municipal	Tegucigalpa, Honduras
	Nascimento 10'; Chávez 41'; Bernárdez 65'	Report	11' Ramírez; 36' Romero	Stadium: Estadio Tiburcio Carías Andino; Attendance: 6,784; Referee: Roberto Moreno (PAN)

Motagua advance 6–3 on aggregate and qualifies to the 2008 CONCACAF Champions' Cup

== Third place ==
27 November 2007 1st leg	Alajuelense (Costa Rica)	0–3 Awarded	(Guatemala) Municipal	Alajuela, Costa Rica
	Myrie 1'	Match suspended after 81 minutes by the referee with the score 1–2 in favor of Municipal. Match awarded 0–3 to Municipal by UNCAF. Report	36' Acevedo; 79' García	Stadium: Estadio Alejandro Morera Soto; Referee: Roberto Moreno (PAN)

4 December 2007 2nd leg	Municipal (Guatemala)	0–1	(Costa Rica) Alajuelense	Guatemala City, Guatemala
		Report	53' Myrie	Stadium: Estadio Mateo Flores; Attendance: 11,000; Referee: Ricardo Zelaya (HON)

Municipal wins 3–1 on aggregate and qualifies for the 2008 CONCACAF Champions' Cup

== Final ==
28 November 2007 1st leg	Saprissa (Costa Rica)	1–1	(Honduras) Motagua	San Juan de Tibás, Costa Rica
20:00 CST	Alpízar 8'	Report	49' García	Stadium: Estadio Ricardo Saprissa Aymá; Referee: Carlos Batres (GUA)

5 December 2007 2nd leg	Motagua (Honduras)	1–0	(Costa Rica) Saprissa	Tegucigalpa, Honduras
20:00 CST	Nascimento 60'	Report		Stadium: Estadio Tiburcio Carías Andino; Attendance: 34,254; Referee: Joel Aguilar (SLV)

Motagua	Saprissa

MOTAGUA:
GK	22	Donaldo Morales
DF	14	Luis Guzmán
DF	19	Osman Chávez
DF	24	Víctor Bernárdez
DF	28	Samir García
MF	13	José Grant		(substituted off) 44'
MF	20	Amado Guevara (c)
MF	21	Emilio Izaguirre	(yellow card) 53'
MF	32	Jorge Claros	(yellow card) 90'
FW	10	Jocimar Nascimento		(substituted off) 90'
FW	31	Luis Rodas		(substituted off) 69'
Substitutions:
FW	9	Jairo Martínez		(substituted on) 44'
MF	5	Milton Reyes		(substituted on) 69'
MF	23	Pedro Santana		(substituted on) 90'
Manager:
(Honduras) Ramón Maradiaga

SAPRISSA:
GK	13	Fausto González
DF	3	Víctor Cordero (c)
DF	14	Andrés Núñez
DF	18	Jervis Drummond		(substituted off) 65'
DF	23	Try Bennett
DF	30	Rándall Porras
MF	10	Alonso Solís	(yellow card) 40'
MF	17	José López		(substituted off) 80'
MF	21	Armando Alonso
MF	31	Michael Barrantes
FW	7	Alejandro Alpízar		(substituted off) 71'
Substitutions:
FW	11	Rónald Gómez		(substituted on) 65'
FW	19	Jairo Arrieta		(substituted on) 71'
FW	12	Ever Alfaro		(substituted on) 80'
Manager:
(Costa Rica) Jeaustin Campos

Motagua wins 2–1 on aggregate.

== Top goalscorers ==
#	Player	Club	Goals
1	(Brazil) J. Nascimento	(Honduras) Motagua	4
2	(Dominican Republic) V. Núñez	(Costa Rica) Alajuelense	3
-	(Guatemala) G. Ramírez	(Guatemala) Municipal	3
-	(Costa Rica) R. Myrie	(Costa Rica) Alajuelense	3
5	(Costa Rica) J. Arrieta	(Costa Rica) Saprissa	2
-	(Belize) J. Serrano	(Belize) Revolutionary Conquerors	2
-	(Costa Rica) W. Centeno	(Costa Rica) Saprissa	2
-	(Honduras) M. Valladares	(Honduras) Real España	2
-	(Honduras) L. Rodas	(Honduras) Motagua	2
-	(Costa Rica) A. Solís	(Costa Rica) Saprissa	2
-	(Guatemala) S. Ponciano	(Guatemala) Municipal	2
-	(Honduras) A. Guevara	(Honduras) Motagua	2
-	(Guatemala) M. Acevedo	(Guatemala) Municipal	2
-	(Costa Rica) A. Alpízar	(Costa Rica) Saprissa	2

== Final standings ==
Pos	Team	Pld	W	D	L	GF	GA	GD	Pts	Result
1	(Honduras) Motagua	8	7	1	0	15	5	+10	22	Winners
2	(Costa Rica) Saprissa	8	3	3	2	11	8	+3	12	Runners-up
3	(Guatemala) Municipal	8	3	2	3	16	19	−3	11	Third place
4	(Costa Rica) Alajuelense	8	2	4	2	7	7	0	10	Semifinalist
5	(Costa Rica) Puntarenas	4	1	2	1	5	3	+2	5	Eliminated in Quarterfinals
6	(Honduras) Real España	4	1	2	1	5	5	0	5	Eliminated in Quarterfinals
7	(Guatemala) Xelajú	4	1	2	1	3	3	0	5	Eliminated in Quarterfinals
8	(Panama) San Francisco	4	1	1	2	1	2	−1	4	Eliminated in Quarterfinals
9	(Belize) Revolutionary Conquerors	2	1	0	1	3	3	0	3	Eliminated in Round of 16
10	(Panama) Tauro	2	1	0	1	1	1	0	3	Eliminated in Round of 16
11	(El Salvador) Once Municipal	2	1	0	1	3	5	−2	3	Eliminated in Round of 16
12	(Honduras) Olimpia	2	0	1	1	0	1	−1	1	Eliminated in Round of 16
13	Belize	2	0	1	1	0	3	−3	1	Eliminated in Round of 16
14	(El Salvador) Isidro Metapán	2	0	1	1	0	3	−3	1	Eliminated in Round of 16
15	(Nicaragua) Real Estelí	2	0	0	2	1	5	−4	0	Eliminated in Round of 16
16	(Nicaragua) Real Madriz	2	0	0	2	0	8	−8	0	Eliminated in Round of 16

- Top 3 qualified to the 2008 CONCACAF Champions' Cup.

== Champion ==
2007 Copa Interclubes UNCAF champion

1st title
