= Fernando Patterson =

Costa Rican footballer (born 1970)

Personal information
- Full name: Fernando Arturo Patterson Castro
- Date of birth: 11 February 1970 (age 56)
- Place of birth: La Francia de Siquirres, Costa Rica
- Height: 1.83 m (6 ft 0 in)
- Position: Goalkeeper

Senior career*
Years	Team	Apps	(Gls)
1989–1990	Limonense		
1990–1994	Turrialba		
1994–1996	Municipal Puntarenas		(3)
1996–1998	Xelajú	7	(0)
1998–1999	Cobán Imperial		
1999–2001	Xelajú	20	(0)
2002–2003	Cartaginés		
2003–2004	Ramonense		
2004–2007	Xelajú	85	(5)
2008	San Carlos	0	(0)
2008–2009	Heredia Jaguares	25	(2)
2009–2010	Xelajú	37	(3)
2010–2011	Xinabajul	41	(0)
2011	Coatepeque	0	(0)
2012–2013	Xelajú	57	(0)

International career
1993	Costa Rica	1	(0)
- * Club domestic league appearances and goals

Fernando Arturo Patterson Castro (born 11 February 1970) is a Costa Rican former football goalkeeper who finished his career at Xelajú in Guatemala's top division.

He is a naturalized citizen of Guatemala.

== Club career ==
Born in La Francia de Siquirres, Patterson has spent part of his playing career in Costa Rica, but he has spent most of it in Guatemala with Xelajú.

He made his debut in 1989 at Limonense and played 113 matches, scoring three goals when also deployed as a striker, for Limonense, Turrialba and Puntarenas, before moving abroad to play in Guatemala with Xelajú and Cobán Imperial. He joined Cartaginés in January 2002 and moved to Ramonense in 2003. In the summer of 2004, Patterson returned to Xelajú.

Patterson signed for San Carlos in January 2008 from Guatemalan side Xelajú, only for him to disappear from the club three weeks later. He ended up playing in Guatemala again for Heredia Jaguares. He signed again for Xelaju from Heredia in June 2009. In May 2011 he returned for another spell at Xela after a season at Xinabajul, only to send him to Coatepeque for the 2011 Apertura season.

In 2012, the 42-year-old Patterson returned to playing for Xelajú and saved three penalties in the 2012 Clausura final against Municipal for Xelajú to clinch the league title and Patterson's third title with the club after 1996 and 2007. This victory also qualified the club to the 2012–13 CONCACAF Champions League, which marked only their third appearance in an international competition. On 21 August 2012, Patterson saved three shots and kept a clean-sheet in a 1–0 victory over Guadalajara, one of the best teams in Mexico. In the away fixture on 25 October, Xelajú lost 2–1, but still managed to top the group on head-to-head away goals, thus becoming just the second Guatemalan team to ever advance to the quarterfinals. Patterson started in both legs of the quarterfinals, which ended in a 2–4 aggregate loss to Monterrey, the latter of which on 12 March 2013, and in doing so at the age of 43 years and 32 days, he became the oldest player in the competition's history.

Patterson retired in June 2013, at 43 years of age.

=== Goalscoring ===
As of April 2007, Patterson had scored 24 league goals and two in the Guatemalan Cup. In November 2009, he was ranked 8th of goalkeepers who had scored most goals by the IFFHS with 28 goals in total and in February 2013 he ranked 7th with 35 goals.

== International career ==
Patterson made his debut for Costa Rica in a July 1993 CONCACAF Gold Cup third-place match against Jamaica. The game proved to be his only cap since he never played again for the Ticos.

== Style of play ==
Patterson can be unorthodox, but he also looks like he thrives under pressure.
