= Guillermo Santo =

Argentine footballer

Personal information
- Full name: Guillermo Hernán Santo
- Date of birth: 4 June 1980 (age 46)
- Place of birth: Lanús, Argentina
- Height: 1.70 m (5 ft 7 in)
- Position: Defensive midfielder

Senior career*
Years	Team	Apps	(Gls)
1998 – 2003	Platense	65	(11)
2003 – 2005	El Porvenir	21	(1)
2005 – 2006	Trujillanos FC	38	(8)
2006 – 2007	Mineros de Guayana	39	(7)
2007 – 2008	Deportivo Anzoátegui	23	(3)
2008	Chacarita Juniors	7	(1)
2009 – 2009	Motagua	8	(0)

International career^{‡}
1997 – 1997	Argentina U-17	4	(0)
- * Club domestic league appearances and goals as of 2009-04-04 ‡ National team caps and goals as of 1997-09-14

Guillermo Santo (born 4 June 1982 in Lanús) is an Argentine association football player who most recently played defensive midfielder for F.C. Motagua.

== Club career ==
Santo began his playing career in 1998 with Club Atlético Platense, he has also played for El Porvenir and Chacarita Juniors in Argentina. Between 2005 and 2008 he played in Venezuela for Trujillanos FC, Mineros de Guayana and Deportivo Anzoátegui.
