= Barillas FC =

Guatemalan football club

- Full name: Barillas Fútbol Club 1era División Guatemala
- Nickname(s): Potros (Young horses)
- Founded: 1994
- Ground: Estadio Enrique Mérida, Santa Cruz Barillas, Huehuetenango Department, Guatemala
- Capacity: 1,000
- Chairman: (Guatemala) Max Fernández
- Manager: (Guatemala) Carlos Cano
- League: Primera División de Ascenso
- Website: https://es-la.facebook.com/barillasfc/
Home colours	Away colours

Barillas Fútbol Club is a Guatemalan football club from Santa Cruz Barillas, Huehuetenango Department. It was founded on 1994 and currently plays at the Primera División de Ascenso, the second tier of Guatemalan football.

== Current squad ==
Note: Flags indicate national team as defined under FIFA eligibility rules; some limited exceptions apply. Players may hold more than one non-FIFA nationality.

No.	Pos.	Nation	Player
—	GK	(Guatemala) GUA	Edin Valiente
—	GK	(Guatemala) GUA	Geslin Castillo
—	DF	(Guatemala) GUA	Luis Castillo
—	DF	(Guatemala) GUA	Hugo Flores
—	DF	(Guatemala) GUA	Julio Vásquez
—	DF	(Guatemala) GUA	Alexis Arandy
—	DF	(Honduras) HON	Luis Santamaría

No.	Pos.	Nation	Player
—	MF	(Guatemala) GUA	Fredy Iboy
—	MF	(Guatemala) GUA	Yoni Barrios
—	MF	(Guatemala) GUA	Gregorio Mateo
—	MF	(Guatemala) GUA	Pedro Ramón
—	FW	(Brazil) BRA	Geovane Carvalho
—	FW	(Colombia) COL	Carlos Peralta
—	FW	(Guatemala) GUA	Luciano Nolasco
