= José Justavino =

Panamanian footballer (born 1981)

Personal information
- Full name: José Omar Justavino
- Date of birth: 2 December 1981 (age 44)
- Place of birth: Panama
- Height: 1.68 m (5 ft 6 in)
- Positions: Supporting striker; attacking midfielder

Team information
- Current team: Millenium Universidad

Senior career*
Years	Team	Apps	(Gls)
2001–2006	Plaza Amador	122	(57)
2003	Racing Córdoba	11	(1)
2007	San Francisco	17	(5)
2008	Motagua	11	(1)
2008–2010	Árabe Unido	65	(13)
2011	Sporting San Miguelito	16	(2)
2012	Chorrillo		
2012–2013	Plaza Amador	30	(0)
2013–	Millenium Universidad		

International career^{‡}
2003–2005	Panama	11	(0)
- * Club domestic league appearances and goals as of 2008-01-20 ‡ National team caps and goals as of 10 June 2015

José Omar Justavino (born December 2, 1981) is a Panama football striker.

== Club career ==
Justavino played for local side Plaza Amador and in August 2003, he moved abroad to join Argentinian third division side Racing Córdoba alongside compatriot Ricardo Buitrago.

El Gato was brought to F.C. Motagua in Honduras in December 2007 from San Francisco by Ramón Maradiaga after viewing his performance in the 2007 Central American regional club tournament against Olimpia and F.C. Motagua. However, he did not last very long in Honduras and returned to Panama to play with Árabe Unido.

In January 2012 he joined Chorrillo from Sporting San Miguelito and in summer 2012 he moved to Plaza Amador for the 2012 Apertura season.

== International career ==
Justavino made his debut for Panama in a 2003 UNCAF Nations Cup match against El Salvador and has earned a total of 11 caps, scoring no goals. He represented his country at the 2003 UNCAF Nations Cup, his sole international tournament.

His final international was a May 2005 friendly match against Venezuela.

== Honors ==
Club

=== National Titles ===
- Liga Panameña de Fútbol: Apertura 2009 II
