= Jefferson Bernárdez =

Honduran footballer (born 1987)

Personal information
- Full name: Jefferson Jair Bernárdez Bennett
- Date of birth: 27 March 1987 (age 39)
- Place of birth: La Ceiba, Honduras
- Height: 1.90 m (6 ft 3 in)
- Position: Forward

Team information
- Current team: Parrillas One

Senior career*
Years	Team	Apps	(Gls)
2006–2009	Motagua		(3)
2009	Hispano		(1)
2010	Real Estelí		
2010–2011	Nueva Concepción		(16)
2011–2012	Petapa		
2012–2013	Antigua		
2013–	Parrillas One		

International career^{‡}
2007–2008	Honduras U23	7	(2)
2008	Honduras	3	(0)
- * Club domestic league appearances and goals as of 2009-07-25 ‡ National team caps and goals as of 2008-08-13

Jefferson Jair Bernárdez Bennett (born 27 March 1987) is a Honduran football forward who currently plays for Parrillas One.

== Club career ==
Nicknamed La Foca, Bernárdez's professional debut was on 11 February 2007, in a match against Broncos UNAH, where he scored the only goal via a perfect header. He was in the starting lineup since the match was at the same time as the UNCAF Nations Cup in El Salvador.

In January 2010 he made his debut for Real Estelí in the Nicaraguan League against Diriangén.

In September 2010 he moved to Guatemala to play for second division Nueva Concepción and in July 2011 he moved up to the top division to join Petapa after scoring 16 goals for Nueva Concepción.

== International career ==
He made his debut for the national side on 22 May 2008 in a friendly against Belize. He was part of the Honduras national U-23 football team that played at the 2008 Summer Olympics.

== Personal life ==
Jefferson Bernárdez is the cousin of Victor Bernardez and Oscar Bernardez. In July 2009, his father died in a fire.
