= Víctor Mena (footballer, born 1980) =

Honduran footballer

Personal information
- Full name: Víctor Humberto Mena Dolmo
- Date of birth: 2 August 1980 (age 46)
- Place of birth: Trujillo, Honduras
- Height: 1.75 m (5 ft 9 in)
- Position: Defender

Team information
- Current team: Barillas
- Number: 7

Senior career*
Years	Team	Apps	(Gls)
2002–2005	Motagua		
2006	Changchun Yatai	6	(0)
2007	Motagua		
2007–2008	Hispano	14	(0)
2008	Motagua	5	(0)
2008–2009	Unión Ájax		
2009–2010	Real Juventud	0	(0)
2010–2012	Victoria	0	(0)
2012	Real España	9	(0)
2013	Atlético Choloma	8	(1)
2013	Barillas		
2014	Deportes Savio		
2015	Barillas		

International career
2003–2010	Honduras	9	(0)
- * Club domestic league appearances and goals as of 22 February 2009

Víctor Humberto Mena Dolmo (born 2 August 1980) is a Honduran footballer who plays as a midfielder for Honduran National League club Atlético Choloma.

== Club career ==
Mena played for several teams in the Honduran National League and joined Real España for the 2012 Apertura championship but lost his place in the team under Chelato Uclés and moved on to Atlético Choloma for the 2013 Clausura.

== International career ==
Mena made his debut for Honduras in an October 2003 friendly match against Bolivia and has, as of January 2013, earned a total of 9 caps, scoring no goals. He was recalled to the national team in 2010 after a four-year hiatus.
