= Osman Chávez =

Honduran footballer (born 1984)

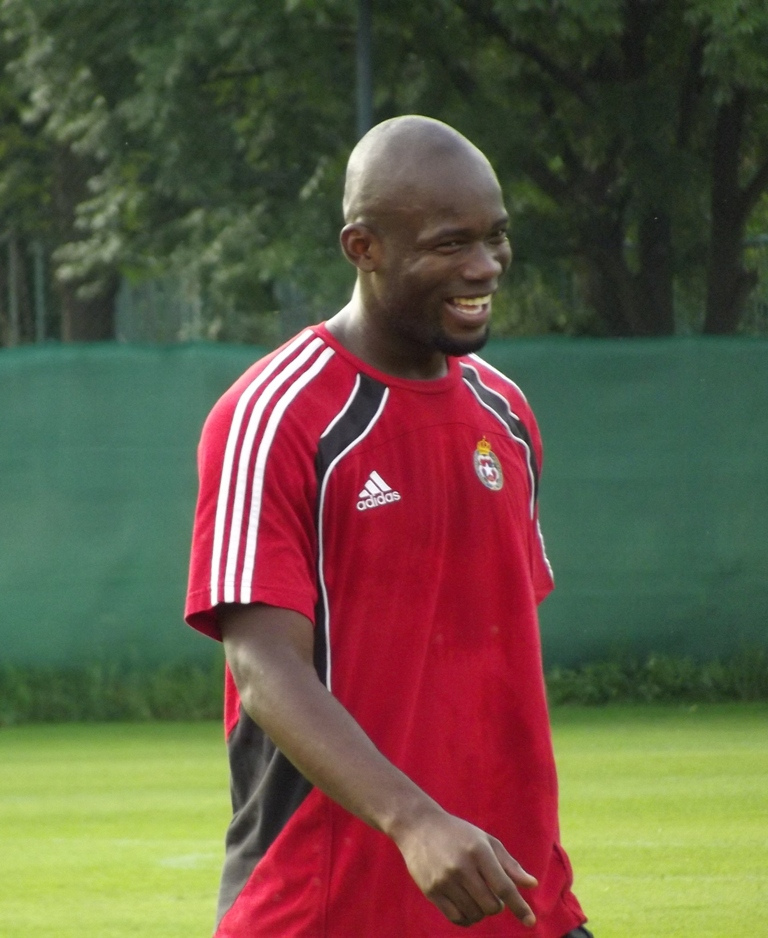

Personal information
- Full name: Osman Danilo Chávez Güity
- Date of birth: 29 July 1984 (age 42)
- Place of birth: Santa Fé, Honduras
- Height: 1.88 m (6 ft 2 in)
- Position: Defender

Youth career
- Platense Junior
- Platense

Senior career*
Years	Team	Apps	(Gls)
2004–2010	Platense	113	(5)
2007–2008	→ Motagua (loan)	34	(0)
2010–2014	Wisła Kraków	62	(2)
2014	→ Qingdao Jonoon (loan)	26	(1)
2015	Platense	13	(2)
2015–2017	Real España	45	(1)
2017	CD Vida	13	(0)

International career
2008–2014	Honduras	55	(0)
Medal record
Honduras
Third place	UNCAF Nations Cup	2009
- * Club domestic league appearances and goals

Osman Danilo Chávez Güity (Latin American Spanish: [ˈosman ˈtʃaβes]; born 29 July 1984) is a Honduran former professional footballer who played as a centre-back.

== Club career ==
Chávez began his career at Platense Junior before moving to Platense. He made his professional debut on 7 October 2004 against Municipal Valencia. In 2007–08 he was loaned to F.C. Motagua and after a successful season he returned to Platese after the clubs failed to reach an agreement on a transfer fee. In 2009 Chávez had been on trial with English Premier League outfit Tottenham Hotspur and Scottish Premier League side Celtic.

On 8 August 2010, Chávez joined Polish team Wisła Kraków. He won the Ekstraklasa championship in his debut season. He was also selected to the Ekstraklasa team of the season by both Canal+ Sport as well as Przegląd Sportowy. After the season Chávez signed a new five-year contract with Wisła.

== International career ==
He made his debut for the national side on 6 February 2008 in a friendly against Paraguay. He has represented his country at the 2009 and 2011 UNCAF Nations Cups as well as at the 2009 and 2011 CONCACAF Gold Cups.

Chávez was a key figure in Honduras's successful push for qualification to the 2010 FIFA World Cup, playing in eleven matches. At the World Cup he played in all three group stage games. At the 2014 FIFA World cup in Brazil he played one match as a second-half substitute against France national team.

== Honours ==
Motagua

- Copa Interclubes UNCAF: 2007

Wisła Kraków

- Ekstraklasa: 2010–11

Honduras

- Copa Centroamericana: 2011

== Statistics ==
(correct as of 11 November 2014)

Club	Season	League	Domestic League		Domestic Cups		Continental Cups		Total	
Club	Season	League	Apps	Goals	Apps	Goals	Apps	Goals	Apps	Goals
Platense	2004–05	Liga Nacional	20	0	–		–		20	0
Platense	2005–06	Liga Nacional	33	1	–		–		33	1
Platense	2006–07	Liga Nacional	19	1	–		–		19	1
Motagua	2007–08	Liga Nacional	34	0	–		10	1	44	1
Platense	2008–09	Liga Nacional	25	2	–		–		25	2
Platense	2009–10	Liga Nacional	16	1	–		–		16	1
Wisła Kraków	2010–11	Ekstraklasa	21	0	2	0	–		23	0
Wisła Kraków	2011–12	Ekstraklasa	19	0	2	0	12	0	33	0
Wisła Kraków	2012–13	Ekstraklasa	18	2	4	0	–		22	2
Wisła Kraków	2013–14	Ekstraklasa	4	0	0	0	–		4	0
Qingdao Jonoon	2014	China League One	26	1	3	0	–		29	1
Total	Plantense		113	5	–		–		113	5
Total	Wisła Kraków		62	2	8	0	12	0	82	2
