= José Luis Grant =

Honduran footballer (born 1983)

José Luís Grant
Personal information
- Full name: José Luís Grant Martínez
- Date of birth: 8 April 1983 (age 43)
- Place of birth: La Ceiba, Honduras
- Position: Attacking midfielder

Team information
- Current team: Real Juventud

Senior career*
Years	Team	Apps	(Gls)
2004–2006	Victoria		
2007–2008	Motagua		
2008	Vida	14	(2)
2008–2012	Real Juventud		

International career^{‡}
2006	Honduras	1	(0)
- * Club domestic league appearances and goals as of 2005 ‡ National team caps and goals as of 2005

José Luís Grant Martínez (born 8 April 1983) is a Honduran football player, who currently plays for Real Juventud.

== Club career ==
He won the rookie of the year for 2005–2006 season. In May 2007, Grant was amid controversy after he allegedly signed with both Olimpia and F.C. Motagua. A tribunal decided in favour of Motagua.

Nicknamed Puma, he later had to return to his previous team, Victoria, since Motagua did not complete the payment of the loan. He was on loan to Vida for the Clausura 2008 from their cross-city rivals Victoria. In summer 2008, he joined Real Juventud. In December 2012 Victoria announced Grant was in training with the club.

== International career ==
Grant made his debut for Honduras in a September 2006 friendly match against El Salvador, coming on as a second-half substitute for Julio César de León. The game proved to be his final international as well.

== Personal life ==
His father was Ricardo Grant and his mother is Juliana Martinez.

== Honours and awards ==
=== Club ===
F.C. Motagua

- Copa Interclubes UNCAF (1): 2007
