= Selvyn Ponciano =

Guatemalan footballer and general manager

Personal information
- Full name: Selvyn Estuardo Ponciano Chitay
- Date of birth: July 18, 1973 (age 53)
- Place of birth: Guatemala, Guatemala
- Height: 1.80 m (5 ft 11 in)
- Position: Defender

Senior career*
Years	Team	Apps	(Gls)
1990–1992	CSD Municipal		
1994–1995	CSD Municipal		
1995–1999	Aurora F.C.		
1999–2000	Comunicaciones		
2000–2009	CSD Municipal	129	(11)

International career^{‡}
1998–2006	Guatemala	9	(1)
- * Club domestic league appearances and goals as of 4 March 2010 ‡ National team caps and goals as of 4 March 2010

Selvyn Estuardo Ponciano Chitay (born 18 July 1973) is a retired Guatemalan football defender and the General Manager of his former club CSD Municipal since 2010.

== Club career ==
The versatile Ponciano has played in all defensive positions as well as a defensive midfielder; he played the majority of his career (13 years) for Guatemala top division club CSD Municipal. He won 11 league titles and 2 domestic cups and also had spells at army club Aurora F.C. and Municipal's eternal rivals Comunicaciones.

He announced his retirement at the end of January 2009 and played his farewell game on February 4 that year to become coach of the Guatemala U-20 national team.

== International career ==
Nicknamed el Bufalo, Ponciano made his debut for Guatemala as a late substitute in a November 1998 friendly match against Mexico and went on to collect a total of 9 caps, scoring 1 goal. He has represented his country in 5 matches during the 2006 World Cup qualification campaign.

His final international was a February 2006 friendly match against the United States.

=== International goals ===
Scores and results list. Guatemala's goal tally first.

#	Date	Venue	Opponent	Score	Result	Competition
1	8 October 2005	Estadio Alfonso Lastras, San Luis Potosi, Mexico	Mexico	2-3	2-5	2006 FIFA World Cup qualification

== Managerial career ==
He was dismissed as national team coach of the Guatemala U20-s and in February 2010 was proposed to return to Aurora as a player.
