= Estadio Marcelo Tinoco =

Coordinates: 14°02′00″N 86°34′28″W

- Interactive map of Estadio Marcelo Tinoco
- Full name: Estadio Marcelo Tinoco
- Location: Danlí, Honduras
- Capacity: 5 000
- Field size: 105 x 67 m

Tenants
- Súper Estrella; Necaxa; Estrella Roja; Real de Minas; Lobos UPNFM

Estadio Marcelo Tinoco is a multi-use stadium located in Danlí, Honduras. It is currently used mostly for football matches.

== History ==
The name of the stadium is a tribute to goalkeeper Marcelo Tinoco, who played in the 1960s and suffered several internal blows after a football match which led him to death.
