= Miguel Castillo =

Honduran football player (born 1983)

Miguel Angel Castillo Flores
Personal information
- Full name: Miguel Angel Castillo Flores
- Date of birth: 30 September 1983 (age 43)
- Place of birth: Tegucigalpa, Honduras
- Height: 1.76 m (5 ft 9 in)
- Position: Midfielder

Team information
- Current team: Victoria

Senior career*
Years	Team	Apps	(Gls)
2001–2002	Olimpia		
2002–2006	Broncos UNAH		
2006–2009	Motagua		(1)
2009–2012	Olimpia		
2012–2013	Victoria		
2013–	Real España		

International career^{‡}
2008–	Honduras	7	(0)
- * Club domestic league appearances and goals as of 2009-05-31 ‡ National team caps and goals as of 2009-07-04

Miguel Angel Castillo Flores (born 30 September 1983) is a Honduran football player, who currently plays for Victoria in the Honduran National League.

== Club career ==
Castillo has played four years for Broncos UNAH, then moved to Motagua and Olimpia where he started his career.

When at Motagua, he and his brother joined a training camp in Turkey to try to seal a contract with an overseas club.

In summer 2012, new Olimpia coach Danilo Tosello deemed Castillo surplus to requirements and he subsequently joined Victoria.

== International career ==
He made his debut for Honduras in a May 2008 friendly match against Belize and has earned a total of 6 caps, scoring no goals. He has represented his country in 2 FIFA World Cup qualification matches and played at the 2009 CONCACAF Gold Cup.

His final international was a July 2009 CONCACAF Gold Cup match against Haiti.

== Personal life ==
Castillo was born in Tegucigalpa and, with his brother, raised by his father Miguel Ángel since their mother left them at an early age. His brother Fernando Castillo played alongside him at Olimpia and Motagua.
