= Ricardo Canales =

Honduran footballer (born 1982)

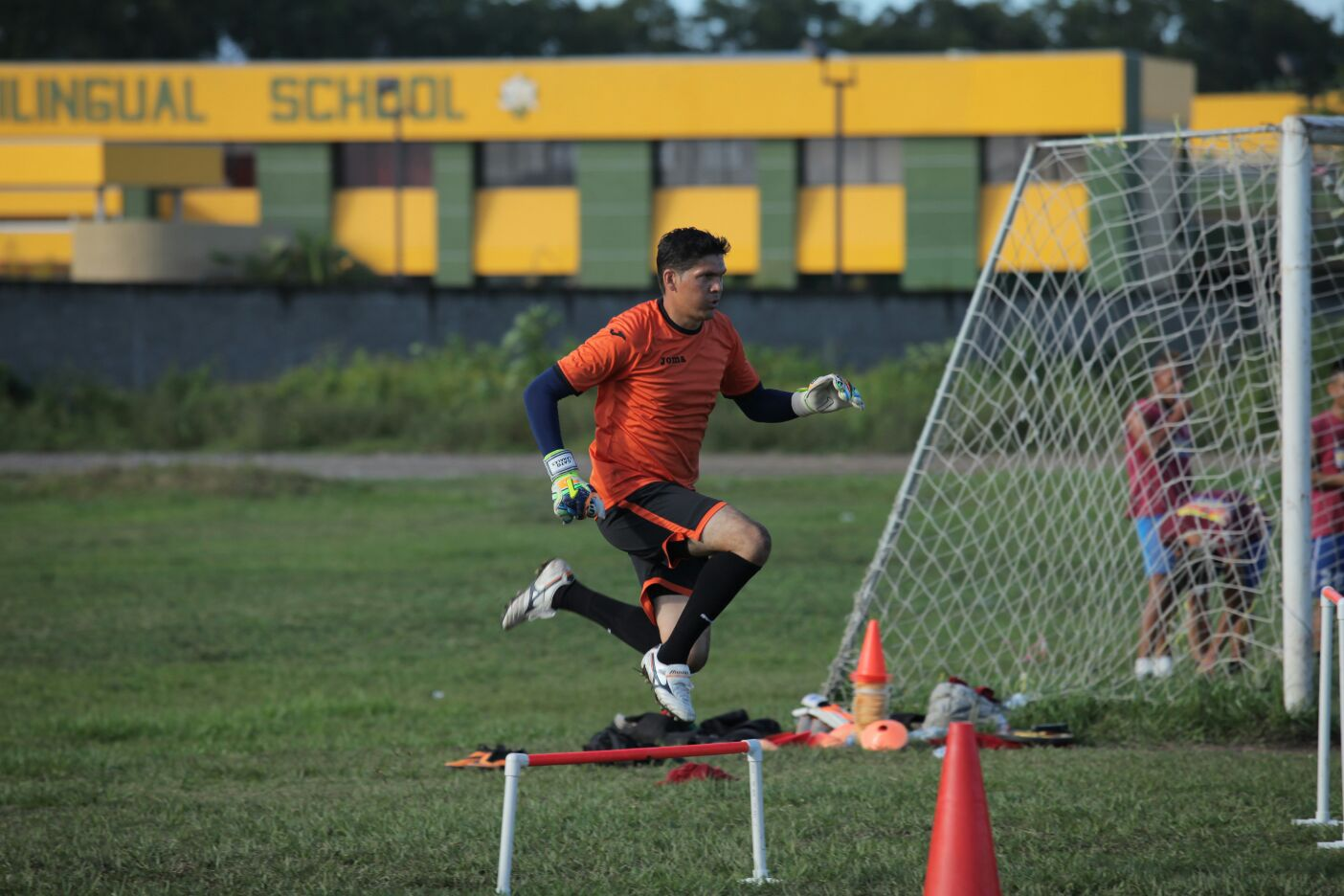
- Ricardo training with current club C.D.S. Vida

Personal information
- Full name: Ricardo Gabriel Canales Lanza
- Date of birth: 30 May 1982 (age 44)
- Place of birth: La Ceiba, Honduras
- Height: 1.81 m (5 ft 11 in)
- Position: Goalkeeper

Senior career*
Years	Team	Apps	(Gls)
2001–2006	Victoria	108	(0)
2006–2010	Motagua	89	(0)
2010–2011	Victoria	24	(0)
2011–2013	Atlético Choloma	27	(0)
2013–2014	Motagua	4	(0)
2014–2021	Vida	154	(2)

International career^{‡}
2009–2010	Honduras	6	(0)
- * Club domestic league appearances and goals as of 19 September 2019 ‡ National team caps and goals as of 15 November 2017

Ricardo Gabriel Canales Lanza (born 30 May 1982) is a Honduran former footballer who played as a goalkeeper.

A Honduran international since 2009, he represented his nation for two Gold Cups and Fifa World Cup 2010.

== Club career ==
Nicknamed el Gato (The Cat), Canales made his debut in league on 16 May 2001 playing for Victoria against Real España.

He was released from Motagua just after he returned from playing with the Honduras national football team in the 2010 FIFA World Cup in South Africa and he returned to Victoria.

In July 2011 he signed for Atlético Choloma, and after two years of participation the club was regulated to Liga Nacional de Ascenso de Honduras. In the year 2013 he rejoined F.C. Motagua on a one-year contract in which he only completed the Apertura tournament. He signed for C.D.S. Vida at the start of the Clausura tournament after lack of playing time with F.C. Motagua, and was brought in to help the club fight regulation.

== International career ==
He made his debut for Honduras in a June 2009 friendly match against Panama and has, as of July 2012, earned a total of 6 caps, scoring no goals. He was a non-playing squad member at both the 2009 CONCACAF Gold Cup, the 2010 FIFA World Cup and 2017 CONCACAF Gold Cup.

== Honours ==
- Motagua

2006–07 (A)
2007 UNCAF
