= Javier Martínez (footballer, born 1971) =

Honduran footballer (born 1971)

Personal information
- Full name: Javier Omar Martínez Jaime
- Date of birth: 6 December 1971 (age 54)
- Place of birth: San Pedro Sula, Honduras
- Position: Defender

Senior career*
Years	Team	Apps	(Gls)
1994–1995	Victoria		
1996–1998	Cobán Imperial		
2001–2002	Victoria	13	(1)
2002–2003	Real España		
2003–2004	Marathón		
2004–2005	Victoria		
2005–2007	Motagua		(1)
2008	Vida	16	(0)

International career^{‡}
1996–2004	Honduras	18	(1)
- * Club domestic league appearances and goals as of 2005 ‡ National team caps and goals as of 2005

Javier Omar Martínez Jaime (born 6 December 1971) is a retired Honduran football defender.

== Club career ==
He started his career at Victoria with whom he had three different spells. He played abroad, for Guatemalan side Cobán Imperial and also played for Honduran giants Real C.D. España, C.D. Marathón and F.C. Motagua.

== International career ==
Martínez made his debut for Honduras in a June 1996 friendly match against Venezuela, in which he immediately scored a goal in the dying seconds, and has earned a total of 18 caps, scoring 1 goal. He has represented his country in 1 FIFA World Cup qualification match and played at the 1997 UNCAF Nations Cup, as well as at the 2003 CONCACAF Gold Cup.

His final international was a February 2004 friendly match against Colombia.

=== International goals ===
N.	Date	Venue	Opponent	Score	Result	Competition
1	22 June 1996	Estadio Olímpico Metropolitano, San Pedro Sula, Honduras	Venezuela	1–0	1–0	Friendly match
