= Steven Bryce =

Costa Rican footballer (born 1977)

Personal information
- Full name: Steven Bryce Valerio
- Date of birth: August 16, 1977 (age 49)
- Place of birth: San José, Costa Rica
- Height: 1.72 m (5 ft 8 in)
- Positions: Attacking midfielder; winger

Senior career*
Years	Team	Apps	(Gls)
1996–1997	AD Goicoechea	26	(5)
1997–2000	Saprissa	127	(39)
2000–2005	Alajuelense	211	(43)
2005	Anorthosis	7	(1)
2006	OFI	3	(0)
2006	Brujas	11	(1)
2007	Marathón	26	(10)
2007–2008	Motagua	15	(1)
2008	Alajuelense	0	(0)
2009	UCR	14	(1)
2010	Brisbane Roar	4	(0)

International career
1998–2005	Costa Rica	73	(9)
- * Club domestic league appearances and goals

Steven Bryce Valerio (born August 16, 1977) is a Costa Rican former footballer who played as an attacking midfielder or winger.

== Club career ==
Bryce began his career in the Costa Rican first division on loan from Deportivo Saprissa with AD Goicoechea, making his debut on September 22, 1996, against Herediano. After that he played for Deportivo Saprissa and Liga Deportiva Alajuelense whom he joined in August 2000. In his nine years in Costa Rica, Bryce won six national championships, in 1997–98, 1998–99, 2000–01, 2001–02, 2002–03 and 2003–04. In addition, he won a CONCACAF Champions' Cup in 2004.

After his tenure with Alajuelense, he went to play with Anorthosis of the Cypriot First Division and OFI of the Super League Greece. He came back to America after a couple of unsuccessful season in Europe and was signed by Brujas, a new club in his native Costa Rica owned by a local magnate. Six months later he decided to move to Marathón in Honduras and then to F.C. Motagua. He never found his form and game in Honduras and by the end of his contract with F.C. Motagua, he suffered and injury that took him out of the fields for almost a year. He signed for Liga Deportiva Alajuelense and started his recovery but did not make it to the pitch one game and was released in summer 2008. In the 2009–2010 season, Bryce was called up by Universidad de Costa Rica a team that desperatively needed players with experience, but again, he never found his form and was released after a few months.

In January 2010, Bryce signed a one-year deal with Brisbane Roar, but the story repeated itself and just after a few games he decided to put an end on his contract and definitively retire from football.

== International career ==
At junior level, Bryce played in 1997 FIFA World Youth Championship held in Malaysia, playing in all three of the team's matches, scoring once against Paraguay. He made his debut for the senior national team in a January 1998 friendly match against Honduras and collected a total of 73 caps, scoring 9 goals. He has represented his country in 18 FIFA World Cup qualification matches. and played at the 1999 and 2003 UNCAF Nations Cups as well as at the 2002, 2003 and 2005 CONCACAF Gold Cups and the 2001 and 2004 Copa América. Most notably however, he represented Costa Rica in the 2002 World Cup, playing in all three of the team's matches, and assisting on one goal against each of Brazil and Turkey. He also was a non-playing squad member at the 2000 CONCACAF Gold Cup.

He played his final international in a July 2005 CONCACAF Gold Cup match against Honduras.

== Personal life ==
He is a son of Eustace Bryce and Mildred Valerio, with whom he lived in Canada in 1991 and 1992. He is married to Cristina Páez. They have a daughter, Sarah, and a son, Samuel.

== Career statistics ==
Scores and results list Costa Rica's goal tally first.

N.	Date	Venue	Opponent	Score	Result	Competition
1.	28 March 1999	Estadio Nacional, San José, Costa Rica	El Salvador	1–0	4-0	1999 UNCAF Nations Cup
2.	18 August 1999	Estadio Centenario, Montevideo, Uruguay	Uruguay	4–5	4–5	Friendly match
3.	28 March 2001	Estadio Alejandro Morera Soto, Alajuela, Costa Rica	Trinidad and Tobago	1–0	3–0	2002 FIFA World Cup qualification
4.	19 July 2001	Estadio Atanasio Girardot, Medellín, Colombia	Bolivia	2–0	4–0	2001 Copa América
5.	16 October 2002	Estadio Ricardo Saprissa Aymá, San José, Costa Rica	Ecuador	1–1	1–1	Friendly match
6.	20 February 2003	Estadio Rommel Fernández, Panama City, Panama	Honduras	1–0	1–0	1999 UNCAF Nations Cup
7.	16 July 2003	Gillette Stadium, Foxborough, United States	Cuba	2–0	3–0	2003 CONCACAF Gold Cup
8.	19 July 2003	Gillette Stadium, Foxborough, United States	El Salvador	4–2	5–2	2003 CONCACAF Gold Cup
9.	7 September 2003	Lockhart Stadium, Fort Lauderdale, United States	China	2–0	2–0	Friendly match

== Honours ==
With Costa Rica:

- UNCAF Nations Cup: 1999, 2005

With Deportivo Saprissa:

- Primera División de Costa Rica: 1997–98, 1998–99

With Liga Deportiva Alajuelense:

- Primera División de Costa Rica: 2000–01, 2001–02, 2002–03, 2004–05
- CONCACAF Champions' Cup: 2004
- Copa Interclubes UNCAF: 2002
- Copa LG Uncaf (Panama) Champions: 2000

With F.C. Motagua:

- UNCAF Interclub Cup: 2007
