= Estadio Carlos Miranda =

Coordinates: 14.4538°N 87.6568°W

Comayagua
- Municipal
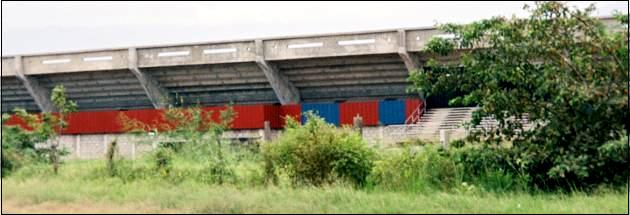
- Interactive map of Comayagua
- Full name: Estadio Municipal Carlos Miranda
- Location: Comayagua City
- Owner: Municipality of Comayagua
- Capacity: 10,000

Construction
- Built: 2005
- Opened: 3 December 2005; 20 years ago
- Architect: Perspectives Arquitectonicas

Tenants
- Hispano / Comayagua (2005–); Motagua (alternate)

Estadio Municipal Carlos Miranda is a multi-purpose stadium in Comayagua, Honduras. It is currently used mostly for football matches and is the home stadium of Hispano FC. The stadium holds 10,000 people.

== History ==
The stadium was proposed by Comayagua mayor Carlos Miranda with the objective of promoting athletics among young people and attracting tourists to the city.

The stadium was financed with funding from the national government, loans from the private sector, and municipal resources and collections. It was designed by the firm "Perspectives Arquitectonicas."

The stadium was completed in 2005 as a multi-use facility with capacity for 10,000 people. The stadium is used mainly for soccer games and serves as the headquarters of the Hispano F.C., a member of the Honduran National Soccer League. The first international match played at Estadio Carlos Miranda was held in January 2006, between C.D. Motagua and Liga Deportiva Alajuelense with a 5–3 victory for the Hondurans.

== Events ==
The Estadio Carlos Miranda hosted the following major international football events:

Competition	Years
CONCACAF Under-20 Championship	2007 (Qualifying tournament)
CONCACAF Women's U-20 Championship	2012 (Qualifying tournament)
CONCACAF Women's U-17 Championship	2016 (Qualifying tournament)
UNCAF U-19 Tournament	2018
