= Milton Reyes =

Honduran footballer and manager (born 1974)

Personal information
- Full name: Milton Alexánder Reyes Galeas
- Date of birth: 2 May 1974 (age 52)
- Place of birth: Arenal, Yoro, Honduras
- Height: 5 ft 10 in (1.78 m)
- Position: Defender

Senior career*
| Years | Team | Apps | (Gls) |
| 1993–1995 | Yoro | | |
| 1995–1997 | Independiente Villela | | |
| 1997–2002 | Motagua | | (0) |
| 2002–2003 | D.C. United | 24 | (0) |
| 2004–2004 | Dallas Burn | 12 | (0) |
| 2005–2011 | Motagua | | (4) |

International career
| 1999–2006 | Honduras | 41 | (0) |

Managerial career
- 2013: Motagua
Medal record
Motagua
| Gold medal – first place | Liga Nacional | 1997–98 A |
| Gold medal – first place | Liga Nacional | 1997–98 C |
| Gold medal – first place | Honduran Super Cup | 1997–98 |
| Silver medal – second place | Honduran Cup | 1998 |
| Bronze medal – third place | Liga Nacional | 1998–99 |
| Gold medal – first place | Liga Nacional | 1999–00 A |
| Gold medal – first place | Liga Nacional | 1999–00 C |
| Gold medal – first place | Liga Nacional | 2001–02 A |
| Bronze medal – third place | Liga Nacional | 2005–06 C |
| Gold medal – first place | Liga Nacional | 2006–07 A |
| Gold medal – first place | Copa Interclubes UNCAF | 2007 |
| Silver medal – second place | Liga Nacional | 2007–08 A |
| Silver medal – second place | Liga Nacional | 2009–10 C |
| Gold medal – first place | Liga Nacional | 2010–11 C |
Honduras
| Bronze medal – third place | Copa América | 2001 |
- * Club domestic league appearances and goals as of 22 November 2011

Milton Alexánder Reyes Galeas (born 2 May 1974) is a retired Honduran football player, who played for primarily F.C. Motagua.

== Club career ==
Nicknamed Jocón, Reyes began playing professional football as a central defender with Yoro FC of the Honduran second division in 1993. He moved to then newly promoted Independiente Villela, for whom he made his debut in the Honduran National League on 24 September 1995 against Vida. He subsequently moved to Motagua, one of Honduras's most prestigious clubs, where he would play from 1997 to 2002, helping the club to five championships.

=== Major League Soccer ===
In 2002, he moved to Major League Soccer, where he signed a contract with D.C. United. Reyes immediately impressed with his offensive forays from the right back position, and ended the season with 24 starts and two assists to his credit. Unfortunately, Reyes tore his ACL in the 2003 preseason, and was forced to miss all of the 2003 season.

Upon his return, Reyes was cut by D.C. United for salary cap reasons, and after considering a return to Honduras, decided to stay in MLS and sign with the Dallas Burn. Although Reyes initially did not impress in Dallas, as he regained his old form his attacking abilities shone through, and he ended the season at Dallas starting both at the left midfield and left back positions for the team, ending the season with 828 minutes in nine starts. Reyes left the team after the season.

=== Back at Motagua ===
He came back to Motagua in 2005. Reyes announced his retirement after finishing the 2008 Clausura tournament but was persuaded to stay with the club until 2011. He retired after the clasico against Olimpia on 30 October 2011.

=== Domestic goals summary ===
| # | Date | Season | Playing for | Opponent | Final score |
|---|---|---|---|---|---|
| 1 | 2006-05-11 | 2005–06 C | Motagua | Olimpia | 2–1 W |
| 2 | 2006-11-19 | 2006–07 A | Motagua | Vida | 2–0 W |
| 3 | 2007-01-28 | 2006–07 C | Motagua | Atlético Olanchano | 2–1 W |
| 4 | 2007-11-25 | 2007–08 A | Motagua | Victoria | 1–0 W |

== International career ==
Reyes made his debut for Honduras in a March 1999 UNCAF Nations Cup match against Belize and has earned a total of 41 caps, scoring no goals. He has represented his country in 17 FIFA World Cup qualification matches and played at the 1999 and 2005 UNCAF Nations Cups as well as at the 2000 CONCACAF Gold Cup. He also appeared in the first match when Honduras took third place at the 2001 Copa América.

His final international was an October 2006 friendly match against Guatemala.

== Personal life ==
Milton Reyes has three kids.

== Honours and awards ==
=== Club ===
F>C. Motagua

- Copa Interclubes UNCAF (1): 2007
