= Rubén Matamoros =

Honduran footballer (born 1982)

Personal information
- Full name: Rubén Juancarlos Matamoros Montoya
- Date of birth: 19 August 1982 (age 44)
- Place of birth: Tegucigalpa, Honduras
- Position: Midfielder

Team information
- Current team: Pumas de San Isidro

Senior career*
Years	Team	Apps	(Gls)
2004–2008	Motagua		(2)
2008	Hispano	0	(0)
2009	Olimpia		
2010–2012	Necaxa		
2012	Real Sociedad		
2013–	Pumas de San Isidro		
- * Club domestic league appearances and goals as of 2008-06-16

Rubén Juancarlos Matamoros Montoya (born 19 August 1982) is a Honduran football player who currently plays for Pumas de San Isidro as a midfielder.

== Club career ==
Matamoros had a couple of seasons with F.C. Motagua and then also played for Hispano F.C., Club Deportivo Olimpia and C.D. Necaxa.

In Summer 2012, Matamoros joined newly promoted C.D. Real Sociedad. He played the 2013 Clausura for second division side Pumas de San Isidro.

== Honours and awards ==
=== Club ===
F.C. Motagua

- Copa Interclubes UNCAF (1): 2007
