= Donaldo Morales =

Honduran football goalkeeper (born 1982)

Personal information
- Full name: Donaldo Antonio Morales
- Date of birth: 13 October 1982 (age 44)
- Place of birth: Marcovia, Honduras
- Height: 1.80 m (5 ft 11 in)
- Position: Goalkeeper

Team information
- Current team: Motagua New Orleans
- Number: 1

Senior career*
Years	Team	Apps	(Gls)
2005–2013	Motagua	129	(0)
2013	Malacateco	14	(0)
2014	Mictlán	18	(0)
2014–2016	Real Sociedad	38	(0)
2015–2016	Social Sol	15	(0)
2016–2017	Platense	12	(0)
2017	Motagua New Orleans	7	(0)

International career^{‡}
2006	Honduras	2	(0)
- * Club domestic league appearances and goals as of 13 June 2013 ‡ National team caps and goals as of 2006

Donaldo Antonio Morales (born 13 October 1982) is a Honduran football goalkeeper, who plays for Motagua New Orleans of the Gulf Coast Premier League.

== Club career ==
Donaldo made 100+ appearances for F.C. Motagua from 2005 to 2013. He won the 2012 Apertura goalkeeper award for conceding the fewest goals. A muscular injury forced Morales to start the 2013 Clausura season on the sidelines.

== International career ==
He was also called for the Honduras national football team twice in 2006 and 2011.

Morales made his debut for Honduras in an August 2006 friendly match against Venezuela and has earned a total of 2 caps, scoring no goals. He was a non-playing squad member at the 2007 CONCACAF Gold Cup.

His final international was a September 2006 friendly match against El Salvador.

== Honours and awards ==
=== Club ===
F.C. Motagua

- Honduran Liga Nacional (2): 2006–07 A, 2010–11 C
- Copa Interclubes UNCAF (1): 2007
