= Pedrinho (footballer, born 1973) =

Brazilian footballer

Personal information
- Full name: Pedro Aparecido Santana
- Date of birth: 8 February 1973 (age 53)
- Place of birth: São Paulo, Brazil
- Position: Forward

Senior career*
| Years | Team | Apps | (Gls) |
| 1997–1998 | Edessaikos | | |
| 2001 | Moto Club | | |
| 2003 | Coríntians | | |
| 2003–2005 | Real España | 71 | (37) |
| 2005–2007 | Motagua | 37 | (24) |
- * Club domestic league appearances and goals as of December 2007

Pedrinho, full name Pedro Aparecido Santana, is a retired Brazilian football player. COMEÇOU NO PALMEIRAS EM 1990 JOGOU ATÉ 1992

== Club career ==
Pedrinho played for Edessaikos in the Greek second division.

He retired after he was released by Honduran side F.C. Motagua.
