= Jairo Martínez =

Honduran footballer (born 1978)

Personal information
- Full name: Jairo Manfredo Martínez Puerto
- Date of birth: 14 May 1978 (age 48)
- Place of birth: La Ceiba, Honduras
- Height: 1.75 m (5 ft 9 in)
- Position: Striker

Senior career*
Years	Team	Apps	(Gls)
1997–2000	Motagua	33	(19)
2000–2002	Coventry City	11	(3)
2002–2005	Motagua	89	(23)
2005	Altamira	4	(1)
2005–2006	Olimpia	20	(2)
2006–2008	Motagua	41	(8)
Total		198	(56)

International career
1998–2008	Honduras	38	(13)
- * Club domestic league appearances and goals

Jairo Manfredo Martínez Puerto (born 14 May 1978) is a Honduran former professional footballer who played as a forward.

== Club career ==
Nicknamed el Kiki, Martínez started his professional career at F.C. Motagua with whom he would spend the majority of his career.

=== Coventry City ===
Martínez most notably played for Coventry City between 2000 and 2002, although he rarely appeared for the first team. He was part of the team that were relegated from the Premier League in 2001, although he never made an appearance that season. The manager at the time, Gordon Strachan, was criticised for making poor signings and Martínez was seen as one of them by the Coventry fans, as well as his compatriot Iván Guerrero who was brought to the club around the same time. It could be argued that Strachan had nothing to do with either of these signings – the squad at that time was arguably too large, and many players brought by consortia more concerned with making a profit on future sales. However, Martinez scored 3 league goals in just 5 starts, with all goals coming away from home against Barnsley, Gillingham and Millwall.

He returned to Honduras and Motagua, then had a short stint in the Mexican second division and a season at Olimpia, before again turning out for Motagua. A knee injury eventually cut short his career and he retired in 2008, aged 30.

He scored 50 goals in total for Motagua, making him the 5th most prolific scorer in the club's history.

== International career ==
Martínez made his debut for Honduras in a November 1999 friendly match against Guatemala and has earned a total of 38 caps, scoring 13 goals. He has represented his country in 4 FIFA World Cup qualification matches and played at the 2000 Summer Olympics. He also played at the 2001, 2003 and 2007 UNCAF Nations Cups as well as at the 2000, 2003s and 2007 CONCACAF Gold Cup.

His final international was a February 2008 friendly match against Belize.

=== International goals ===
N.	Date	Venue	Opponent	Score	Result	Competition
1	10 November 1999	Estadio Mateo Flores, Guatemala City, Guatemala	Guatemala	1–1	1–1	Friendly match
2	16 December 1999	Estadio Olímpico Metropolitano, San Pedro Sula, Honduras	Zambia	4–0	7–1	Friendly match
3	27 January 2000	Estadio Olímpico Metropolitano, San Pedro Sula, Honduras	Ecuador	1–1	1–1	Friendly match
4	10 February 2000	Estadio Francisco Morazán, San Pedro Sula, Honduras	El Salvador	5–1	5–1	Friendly match
5	22 March 2000	Estadio Nacional, Santiago, Chile	Chile	1–1	2–5	Friendly match
6	25 May 2001	Estadio Tiburcio Carías Andino, Tegucigalpa, Honduras	Nicaragua	7–1	10–2	2001 UNCAF Nations Cup
7	25 May 2001	Estadio Tiburcio Carías Andino, Tegucigalpa, Honduras	Nicaragua	8–1	10–2	2001 UNCAF Nations Cup
8	11 February 2003	Estadio Rommel Fernández, Panama City, Panama	Nicaragua	1–0	2–0	2003 UNCAF Nations Cup
9	18 February 2003	Estadio Rommel Fernández, Panama City, Panama	Panama	1–0	1–1	2003 UNCAF Nations Cup
10	22 June 2003	The Home Depot Center, Carson, USA	Guatemala	1–1	2–1	Friendly match
11	15 February 2007	Estadio Cuscatlán, San Salvador, El Salvador	Nicaragua	1–0	9–1	2007 UNCAF Nations Cup
12	27 March 2007	SAS Soccer Park, Cary, USA	El Salvador	1–0	2–0	Friendly match
13	27 March 2007	SAS Soccer Park, Cary, USA	El Salvador	2–0	2–0	Friendly match

== Honours and awards ==
=== Club ===
F.C. Motagua

- Copa Interclubes UNCAF: 2007
