= Luis Rodas =

Honduran footballer (born 1985)

Personal information
- Full name: Luis René Rodas Medina
- Date of birth: 3 January 1985 (age 41)
- Place of birth: Tegucigalpa, Honduras
- Height: 1.71 m (5 ft 7 in)
- Position: Forward

Team information
- Current team: Mictlán

Youth career
- 1995–: Motagua B

Senior career*
Years	Team	Apps	(Gls)
–2006	Valencia		
2006–2007	Hispano		
2007–2008	Motagua		(13)
2009–2010	Suchitepéquez	25	(6)
2010–2011	Necaxa	0	(0)
2011–	Mictlán		

International career^{‡}
2007–2008	Honduras U-23	4	(0)
2007	Honduras	1	(0)
- * Club domestic league appearances and goals as of 2008-09-11 ‡ National team caps and goals as of 2008-08-13

Luis René Rodas Medina (born 3 January 1985) is a Honduran football striker who plays for Mictlán.

== Club career ==
Nicknamed el Castor (the Beaver), he previously played for F.C. Motagua since he was 10 years old.

After Rodas and teammate Roy Posas were released by Motagua after a drink-driving incident which led to their arrest, Rodas moved abroad to play for Guatemalan side Suchitepéquez where he was joined by compatriot José Güity in 2009. He joined Necaxa for the 2010 Apertura championship and returned to Guatemala to play the 2012 Clausura for Mictlán.

== International career ==
Rodas has played in every category of the Honduras national football team, making his debut for the senior side versus El Salvador. He also played at the 2008 Summer Olympics.

== Honours and awards ==
=== Club ===
F.C. Motagua

- Copa Interclubes UNCAF (1): 2007
