= Jorge Claros =

Honduran footballer (born 1986)

Personal information
- Full name: Jorge Aarón Claros Juárez
- Date of birth: 8 January 1986 (age 40)
- Place of birth: La Ceiba, Honduras
- Height: 1.77 m (5 ft 9 1/2 in)
- Position: Defensive midfielder

Team information
- Current team: Broncos

Senior career*
Years	Team	Apps	(Gls)
2004–2006	Vida	17	(0)
2006–2014	Motagua	164	(6)
2012–2013	→ Hibernian (loan)	44	(0)
2014	Sporting Kansas City	7	(0)
2015	Qingdao Jonoon	13	(0)
2016–2017	Alajuelense	30	(2)
2017–2020	Real España	74	(1)
2021	C.D. Real Sociedad	12	(0)
2022-	Broncos	0	(0)

International career^{‡}
2005	Honduras U-20	5	(0)
2007–2008	Honduras U-23	5	(0)
2006–2018	Honduras	85	(3)
- * Club domestic league appearances and goals as of 27 August 2017 ‡ National team caps and goals as of 12 November 2017

Jorge Aarón Claros Juárez (Spanish pronunciation: [ˈxoɾxe ˈklaɾos]; born 8 January 1986) is a Honduran footballer, who plays for Broncos.

== Club career ==
Claros started his career at Vida before joining Honduran giants F.C. Motagua in 2005. In January 2012 he went on trial at Scottish club Rangers. He then went on trial with another Scottish club, Hibernian, and he signed a loan contract with Hibernian on 31 January. Claros helped Hibernian to reach the 2012 Scottish Cup Final, but he was substituted during the first half of a 5–1 defeat to Hearts. On 16 January 2013, Hibs stated that the clubs were in discussions about the possibility of extending the loan agreement. Later in January, the deal was extended until the end of the 2012–13 season. Claros helped Hibernian reach the 2013 Scottish Cup Final, which ended in a 3–0 defeat to Celtic. He was offered a long-term contract by Hibernian, but returned to Motagua because they continued to demand a large transfer fee.

Claros signed with Major League Soccer club Sporting Kansas City on 16 July 2014.

== International career ==
Claros was a member of the Honduras national football team at the 2005 Youth World Cup in Netherlands and the 2008 Summer Olympics in Beijing. He made his debut for the senior national team in an August 2006 friendly match against Venezuela and has, as of July 2012, earned a total of 30 caps, scoring 2 goals. He has represented his country in 3 FIFA World Cup qualification matches and played at the 2007 and 2011 UNCAF Nations Cups as well as at the 2007 CONCACAF Gold Cup.

Claros was recalled to the national team in September 2012 for 2014 FIFA World Cup qualification matches against Cuba. He scored the only goal of the game in a 2013 CONCACAF Gold Cup match against El Salvador, which meant that Honduras secured a place in the knockout stages of the tournament. He helped Honduras qualify for the 2014 FIFA World Cup, where they were drawn with France, Ecuador and Switzerland. Claros played as a substitute in their first game, a 3–0 defeat by France. He then came into the starting lineup for the second match, as Wilson Palacios had been sent off against France. Claros "added some composure", but Honduras lost 2–1 to Ecuador.

=== International goals ===
Scores and results list Honduras' goal tally first.

N.	Date	Venue	Opponent	Score	Result	Competition
1.	18 January 2011	Estadio Rommel Fernández, Panama City, Panama	Guatemala	2–1	3–1	2011 Copa Centroamericana
2.	18 January 2011	Estadio Rommel Fernández, Panama City, Panama	Guatemala	3–1	3–1	2011 Copa Centroamericana
3.	12 July 2013	Sun Life Stadium, Miami Gardens, USA	El Salvador	1–0	1–0	2013 CONCACAF Gold Cup

== Shooting ==
Claros was shot in the head on 16 June 2011 after car thieves failed to steal his vehicle. As he stopped his car to drop off a friend, 2 unidentified men with pistols shot at them, and Claros was hit in the shoulder and in the head. Claros managed to drive himself to the hospital and it was found that the wounds were not near fatal. Within three weeks Claros was back playing football for Motagua, his club at the time.

== Career statistics ==
As of 23 April 2016

Club	Season	League		Scottish Cup		League Cup		Total	
Club	Season	Apps	Goals	Apps	Goals	Apps	Goals	Apps	Goals
Hibernian (loan)	2011–12	10	0	3	0	0	0	13	0
Hibernian (loan)	2012–13	34	0	5	0	1	0	40	0
Hibernian totals		44	0	8	0	1	0	53	0

International

As of 14 August 2013

Honduras national team
Year	Apps	Goals
2006	4	0
2007	12	0
2010	6	0
2011	9	2
2012	3	0
2013	7	1
Total	41	3

== Honours and awards ==
=== Club ===
F.C. Motagua

- Honduran Liga Nacional (2): 2006–07 A, 2010–11 C
- Copa Interclubes UNCAF (1): 2007 UNCAF

=== Country ===
Honduras

- Copa Centroamericana (1): 2011
