= Jocimar Nascimento =

Brazilian footballer

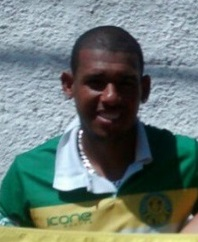

Personal information
- Full name: Jocimar Nascimento
- Date of birth: 18 January 1979 (age 47)
- Place of birth: Vila Velha, Brazil
- Height: 1.85 m (6 ft 1 in)
- Position: Forward

Senior career*
Years	Team	Apps	(Gls)
1998	Ribeirão Preto		
1998–1999	Matonense		
1999–2000	Oeste		
2000–2001	Guaratinguetá		
2002–2003	Ionikos	12	(1)
2003–2004	Figueirense		
2004	Lages		
2004–2005	São Bento		
2005–2006	União São João		
2006	Guaratinguetá		
2006–2009	Motagua	99	(31)
2009–2010	Olimpia		
2010	Vitória		
2010	Suchitepéquez		
2011	Vida		(8)
2012	Deportes Savio		(8)
2012–2013	Motagua	28	(7)
2014	Istiklol	0	(0)
2014–2017	Tupy	44	(21)
- * Club domestic league appearances and goals

Jocimar Nascimento (born 18 January 1979), also known as Lambiru, is a Brazilian former football player. He is most known for his tenure at Motagua in the Honduran Liga Nacional as a forward, coming by a recommendation of Luciano Emílio. He tried out for a season in the Chinese Super League but came back to Motagua. He knows the Honduran National Anthem and stated that if he would be called up for the Honduran team that he would be glad to accept.

With his help, Motagua has won the last edition of UNCAF Interclubes in 2007 and the 2006–07 Apertura season.

In May 2010, he signed for C.D. Suchitepéquez in the Guatemalan league.

Jocimar previously played for Figueirense Futebol Clube in the Campeonato Brasileiro.

In January 2014, Jocimar signed a one-year contract with Tajik League side FC Istiklol. After leaving Istikol, he signed to play for his hometown team, Esporte Clube Tupy.

== Honours ==
- Motagua

2006–07 Apertura
2007 Interclubes UNCAF
