= Víctor Bernárdez =

Honduran footballer (born 1982)

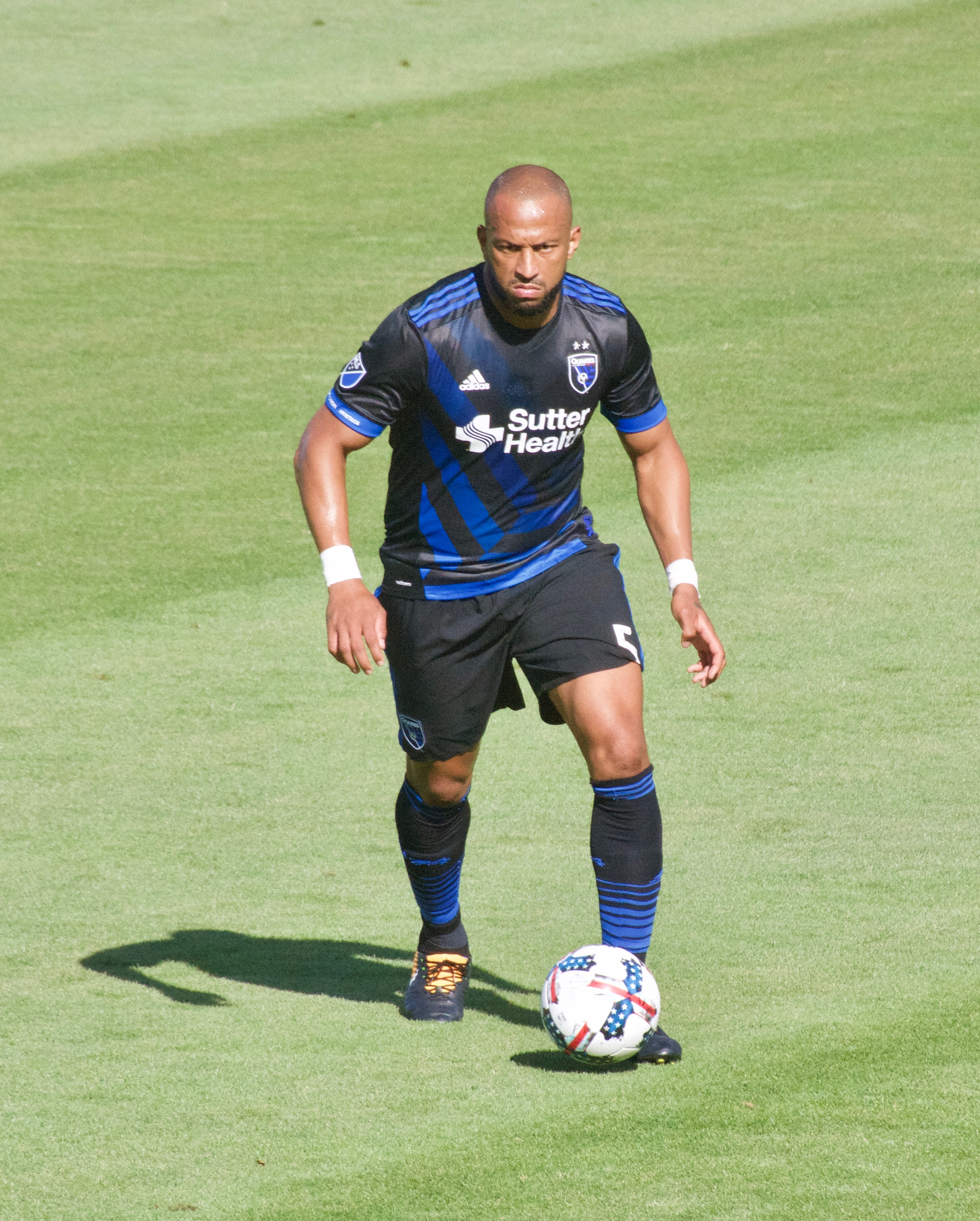
- Bernárdez with the San Jose Earthquakes in 2017

Personal information
- Full name: Víctor Salvador Bernárdez Blanco
- Date of birth: 24 May 1982 (age 44)
- Place of birth: La Ceiba, Honduras
- Height: 1.88 m (6 ft 2 in)
- Position: Center-back

Senior career*
Years	Team	Apps	(Gls)
2003	Vida	16	(0)
2004–2009	Motagua	62	(10)
2009	→ Anderlecht (loan)	0	(0)
2009–2011	Anderlecht	22	(1)
2011	→ Lierse (loan)	9	(1)
2011	→ Indios (loan)	12	(3)
2012–2017	San Jose Earthquakes	178	(6)
2019	Oakland Roots	2	(0)

International career
2003–2004	Honduras U23	7	(2)
2004–2014	Honduras	86	(4)

Managerial career
- 2019: Oakland Roots (assistant)
- * Club domestic league appearances and goals

Víctor Salvador Bernárdez Blanco (Spanish pronunciation: [ˈbiɣtoɾ βeɾˈnaɾðes]; born 24 May 1982), also known as Muma, is a Honduran former footballer who played as a defender.

== Early life ==
Bernárdez was raised in La Ceiba, living with his mother, sisters, and extended family in a single house. He grew up relatively poor and endured hardships, including having his home damaged because of Hurricane Mitch in 1998. He started playing soccer in his youth with the other children of his neighborhood. Bernárdez earned the nickname of "Muma" from teammates of Vida and Honduran national player Rene “Pupa” Martinez. They noticed him following Martinez at every chance he got, so he was the Muma to Pupa. Eventually he was able to join CDS Vida, who his grandfather had played for as well as coached.

== Club career ==
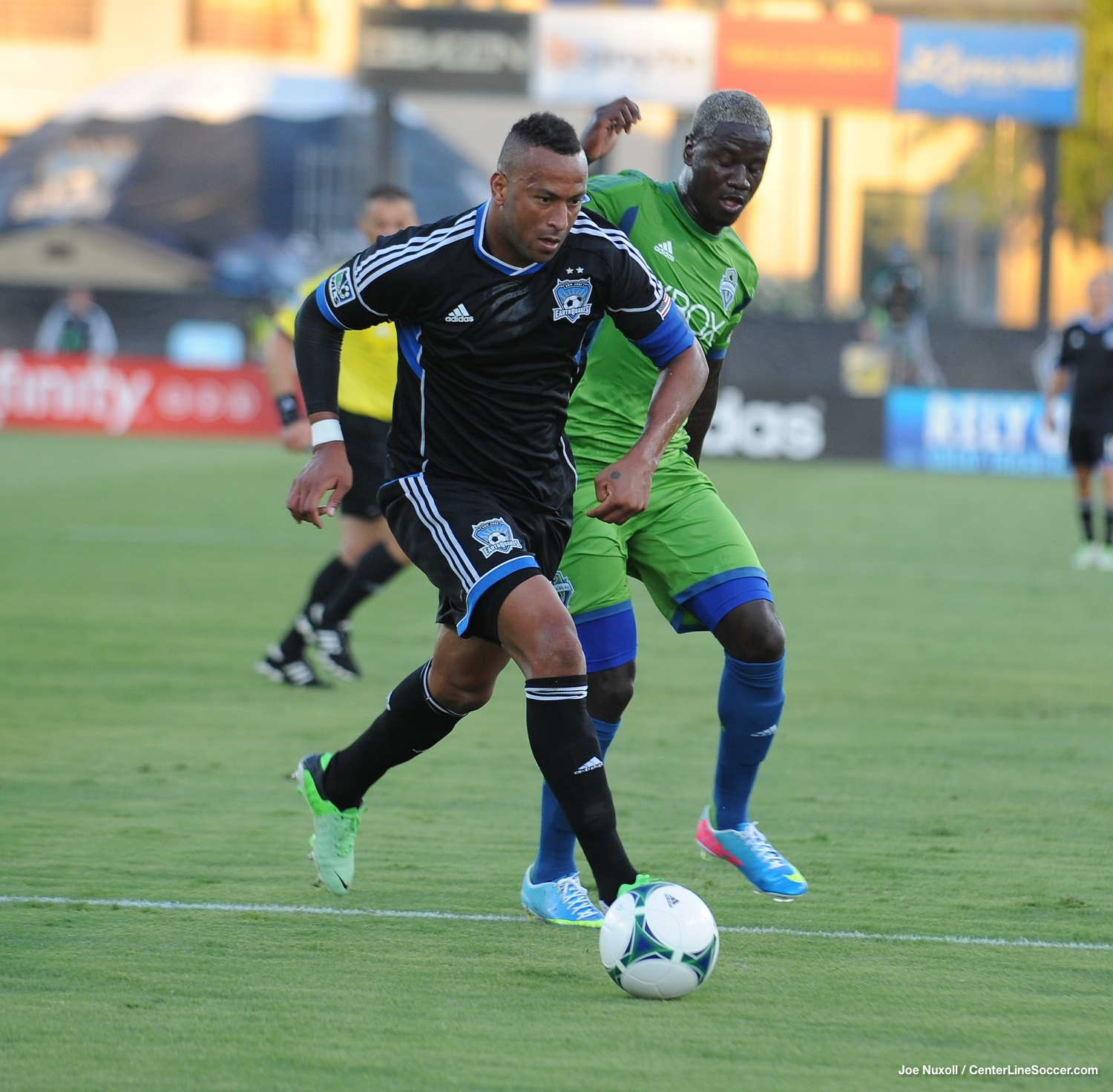

=== CDS Vida (2003) ===
Víctor Bernárdez began his career in La Ceiba with his hometown club Vida. His play with Vida as well as familial connections earned him a move to top Honduran side Motagua.

=== Motagua (2004–2008) ===
Bernardez credits his uncle with helping to facilitate his move to Motagua from Vida. His uncle knew members of the organization and recommended for them to sign Bernárdez. Bernardez scored several important goals in his time with Motagua, including a brace against Olimpia to win the Apertura final 4–2 on aggregate. He also scored a 40-yard free kick in El Clasico de las Emes, capping a 4–1 win for Motagua on 2 July 2007. He was linked to Anderlecht as well as many Major League Soccer teams in the winter market. However, in January 2009, it became official that he had been loaned to Anderlecht for six months.

=== Anderlecht (2009–2011) ===
He scored his first goal for the team on 7 February 2009, against Mons during his second appearance with the squad. In January 2011, Bernárdez was sent to Lierse S.K. on a five-month loan. Later in the year he was again sent on loan, this time to Mexican club Indios de Ciudad Juárez. Bernárdez was an important player for Indios, appearing in 11 matches and scoring three goals.

=== San Jose Earthquakes (2012–2017) ===
On 28 December 2011 San Jose Earthquakes of Major League Soccer announced that they had signed Bernárdez. Bernárdez made his debut for San Jose on April 3, in their first match of the 2012 season in a 1–0 win against the New England Revolution. His first goal for the club came in a California Clásico match, with Bernárdez scoring off a corner kick from fellow countryman Marvin Chavez. He went on to make 24 starts for the Earthquakes, quickly becoming a consistent starter for the team. Bernárdez gained recognition for his individual play for the team, being named a finalist for Defender of the Year and Newcomer of the Year, as well as part of the 2012 MLS Best XI. His play helped lead the Earthquakes to the Supporters' Shield, which was their first trophy in seven years. Bernárdez proved to be a key member of the Earthquakes in playoffs, scoring in the first leg of the Western Conference semi-finals away to the LA Galaxy. In the following match, Bernárdez left in the 12th minute with an injury and the Earthquakes subsequently gave up three goals, losing the match as well as the playoff series.

San Jose's Supporters Shield win in 2012 won the team qualification for the 2013–14 CONCACAF Champions League. Bernardez made his competition debut on 28 August 28 2013, in a 1–0 loss away to Heredia Jaguares de Peten. On 14 October 2014, the Earthquakes hosted Bernárdez's hometown club CDS Vida. He was unable to play in the match due to being called up for national team duty.

Bernardez made his 100th appearance for the San Jose Earthquakes on 28 August 2015, in a 1–0 win against the LA Galaxy.

He stated in August 2017 that he hoped to play one final season with San Jose in 2018 and then retire as an Earthquake. His contract option for the 2017 season was not picked up by San Jose on 27 November 2017, and he confirmed on Instagram that same day that his days as an Earthquake were over. Bernardez played in 178 matches during his MLS career.

=== Oakland Roots SC (2019) ===
On 14 June 2019, Bernárdez joined Oakland Roots SC ahead of their inaugural NISA season. In addition to playing, Bernárdez would also act as an assistant coach and Captain appearing in two matches.

== International career ==
He made his debut for Honduras in a March 2004 friendly match against Venezuela and has earned, as of June 2012, a total of 64 caps, scoring four goals. He has represented his country in 23 FIFA World Cup qualification matches and played one match at the 2010 FIFA World Cup. He also featured at the 2007 UNCAF Nations Cup as well as at the 2011 CONCACAF Gold Cup. Bernárdez announced before the 2014 World Cup that he would retire after Honduras' last match in the tournament. Bernárdez played in every one of Honduras' group stage matches at the 2014 tournament including what was his final appearance for the team, a 3–0 defeat to Switzerland. The following year Bernárdez reconfirmed his decision to retire from international play, citing the need for him to move on so that new players could get their chance with the side. He also stated that his best memories playing with the national team were his participation in two World Cups as well as helping Honduras to beat Mexico in Estadio Azteca in 2013.

=== International goals ===
Víctor Bernárdez: International goals
No.	Date	Venue	Opponent	Score	Result	Competition
1	6 September 2006	Estadio Tiburcio Carías Andino, Tegucigalpa, Honduras	El Salvador	1 – 0	2–0	Friendly
2	23 May 2008	Estadio Olímpico Metropolitano, San Pedro Sula, Honduras	Belize	1 – 0	2–0	Friendly
3	2 June 2012	Robert F. Kennedy Memorial Stadium, Washington D.C., United States	El Salvador	1 – 0	3–0	Friendly
4	7 September 2012	Estadio Pedro Marrero, Havana, Cuba	Cuba	2 – 0	3–0	2014 World Cup qualifier

== Personal life ==
Bernárdez is married to Wendy Salgado, who represented Honduras at Miss Universe 2007. They have two children, Ananda and Megan. He also has a daughter named Victoria who lives with his mother in Honduras.

Bernárdez has spoken out on quite a few occasions about the violence in Honduras, using his position as a national team player to shine a light on the situation. Before the 2014 World Cup he and fellow national team representatives partnered with the U.S. Agency for International Development and held a small conference entitled The Power of Soccer to Combat Youth Violence in Honduras. After retiring from soccer, he will likely stay in Honduras and try to make a difference through soccer in a similar way that it helped him escape from violence.

== Honours ==
F.C. Motagua

- Honduran Liga Nacional: Apertura 2006–07
- Copa Interclubes UNCAF: 2007

R.S.C. Anderlecht

- Belgian Pro League: 2009–10

San Jose Earthquakes

- MLS Supporters' Shield: 2012

National Soccer Hall of Fame

- Nominated: 2021

Individual

- MLS Best XI: 2012
