= Óscar Torlacoff =

Uruguayan footballer (born 1973)

Personal information
- Full name: Óscar Horacio Torlacoff Acosta
- Date of birth: 22 December 1973 (age 52)
- Place of birth: Montevideo, Uruguay
- Height: 1.89 m (6 ft 2 1/2 in)
- Position: Striker

Team information
- Current team: Atlético Choloma
- Number: 28

Senior career*
Years	Team	Apps	(Gls)
1990–1993	Nacional		
1993–1996	Central Español		
1996–2002	Plaza Colonia		
2002	Comunicaciones		
2002–2005	Plaza Colonia		
2005	Atenas San Carlos		
2005–2006	Broncos UNAH	13	(6)
2006–2009	Motagua	96	(28)
2009–2011	Hispano		(11)
2011–	Atlético Choloma		(29)
- * Club domestic league appearances and goals as of 8:47, 22 August 2011 (UTC)

Óscar Horacio Torlacoff Acosta (born 22 December 1973) is a Uruguayan footballer who plays as striker with Liga Nacional de Honduras club Atlético Choloma.

He scored the Liga Nacional's 14,000th goal with a header on 17 September 2006 in the F.C. Motagua's 2-0 victory against Real C.D. España.
