= 2012–13 C.D. Motagua season =

Motagua
2012–13 season
- Chairman: Pedro Atala
- Manager: José Treviño; José Clavasquín; Juan Castillo
- Apertura: Semifinalist
- Clausura: 7th
- Top goalscorer: League: Hernández (7); All: Hernández (7)
- Highest home attendance: 9,533
- Lowest home attendance: 452
- Average home league attendance: 2,719
| Home colours | Away colours | Third colours |
- All statistics correct as of 20 April 2013.

The 2012–13 season is F.C. Motagua's 62nd season in existence and the club's 47th consecutive season in the top fight of Honduran football. The domestic league will be divided into two tournaments, Apertura and Clausura. The Apertura was scheduled to be played in the second half of 2012, while the Clausura in the first half of 2013. Motagua will be looking for its 13th domestic championship. Due to an unsuccessful 2011–12 season, the club won't have international participation.

== Overview ==
The Apertura tournament was played from August to December 2012. On 8 May 2011, the fitness coach Juan Bertani announced his departure from the club, one day earlier José Treviño was confirmed as manager for the third consecutive tournament. The first player to sign for the club was César Oseguera who played as midfielder for Atlético Choloma last season. One day later on 10 May, Brazilian forward Jocimar Nascimento returned to the Eagles, Jocimar was a key player for the club from 2006–2009. On the same day, midfielder Abner Méndez joined from C.D.S. Vida.

On 14 May, Motagua acquired 21-year-old forward Eddie Hernández who had a fleeting passage on Sweden with BK Häcken; Hernández is also part of the U-23 national team that will play at the 2012 Summer Olympics. The first player to left the team was Sergio Mendoza on 12 May; Julio de León was also released on 15 May. Roger Mondragón joined Vida on loan, as well as Adán Ramírez who was loaned to C.D. Real Sociedad. After 3 tournaments and one goalscorer award with the blues, Jerry Bengtson signed a 4-year agreement with MLS club New England Revolution.

On 4 July, the league announced the fixtures for the Apertura tournament, Motagua faced C.D. Victoria on round one and lost 1–2, the game was played at Estadio San Jorge in Olanchito due to repairs on Estadio Nilmo Edwards.

On 20 October, Motagua lost the Honduran Superclásico against archrivals C.D. Olimpia 0–2; three days later, manager José Treviño was sacked due to poor results. Former defender Reynaldo Clavasquín took over the club. With Clavasquín as manager, Motagua was able to lift its performance considerable and qualified to the playoffs as thirds.

On the second round, Motagua overcame easily over Real C.D. España with a convincing 7–3 aggregate score. On the semifinals, the team wasn't so lucky and were eliminated by C.D. Victoria after a 3–3 aggregate score, result that was not enough due to a lower finish in the regular season.

The Clausura tournament was played from January to May 2013. The club's preseason started on 10 December 2012. Motagua announced that some home games will be played at other venues; their first Clausura game was played at Estadio Fausto Flores Lagos in Choluteca and ended with an unexpected 0–1 defeat against C.D. Real Sociedad. On 10 March 2013, the club's staff hired former manager Juan de Dios Castillo replacing José Clavasquín. The poor results were constant throughout the entire tournament, which resulted in another early elimination in the regular season.

== Players ==
=== Transfers in ===
| No. | Pos. | Player | Moving from |
|---|---|---|---|
| 10 | FW | (Brazil) Jocimar Nascimento | (Honduras) Deportes Savio |
| 12 | MF | (Honduras) Abner Méndez | (Honduras) Vida |
| 19 | MF | (Honduras) César Oseguera | (Honduras) Atlético Choloma |
| 23 | FW | (Honduras) Eddie Hernández | (Sweden) BK Häcken |
| – | FW | (Honduras) Christian Martínez | (Honduras) Real España |
| 28 | MF | (Honduras) Adán Ramírez | (Honduras) Real Sociedad |
| 34 | DF | (Honduras) Roger Mondragón | (Honduras) Vida |
| 35 | MF | (Honduras) Marvin Cálix | Reserves |

=== Transfers out ===
| No. | Pos. | Player | Moving to |
|---|---|---|---|
| 10 | MF | (Honduras) Julio de León | (Italy) Messina |
| 12 | DF | (Honduras) Luis Guzmán | (Honduras) Atlético Choloma |
| 18 | MF | (Honduras) Roger Mondragón | (Honduras) Vida |
| 23 | DF | (Honduras) Sergio Mendoza | (Guatemala) Universidad de San Carlos |
| 27 | FW | (Honduras) Jerry Bengtson | (United States) New England Revolution |
| 28 | MF | (Honduras) Adán Ramírez | (Honduras) Real Sociedad |
| 29 | MF | (Honduras) Alejandro Aguiluz | TBD |
| 30 | MF | (Honduras) Mishek Ávila | (Honduras) Deportes Savio |
| 12 | MF | (Honduras) Abner Méndez | (Honduras) Atlético Choloma |
| 16 | DF | (Honduras) Johnny Leverón | (Canada) Vancouver Whitecaps |
| – | DF | (Honduras) Héctor García | (Honduras) Deportes Savio |

=== Squad ===
- Statistics as of 20 April 2013
- Only league matches into account

| No. | Pos. | Player name | Date of birth and age | Games played | | | Goals scored | | |
| | | | | < 11/12 | 12/13 | Total | < 11/12 | 12/13 | Total |
|---|---|---|---|---|---|---|---|---|---|
| 1 | GK | (Uruguay) Kerpo de León | 25 February 1974 (aged 38) | 18 | 6 | 24 | 0 | 0 | 0 |
| 2 | DF | (Honduras) Odis Borjas | 3 October 1987 (aged 24) | 51 | 27 | 78 | 0 | 0 | 0 |
| 3 | DF | (Honduras) Henry Figueroa | 28 December 1992 (aged 19) | 0 | 3 | 3 | 0 | 0 | 0 |
| 4 | DF | (Honduras) Júnior Izaguirre | 12 August 1979 (aged 32) | 268 | 32 | 300 | 32 | 0 | 32 |
| 5 | DF | (Honduras) David Molina | 14 March 1988 (aged 24) | 77 | 22 | 99 | 4 | 1 | 5 |
| 6 | MF | (Honduras) Emilson Cruz | 24 October 1987 (aged 24) | 29 | 20 | 49 | 0 | 0 | 0 |
| 7 | MF | (Honduras) Carlos Discua | 20 September 1984 (aged 27) | 30 | 33 | 63 | 8 | 6 | 14 |
| 8 | MF | (Honduras) Carlos Morán | 19 July 1984 (aged 27) | 24 | 20 | 44 | 2 | 3 | 5 |
| 9 | FW | (Honduras) Georgie Welcome | 9 March 1985 (aged 27) | 82 | 25 | 107 | 29 | 5 | 34 |
| 10 | FW | (Brazil) Jocimar Nascimento | 18 January 1979 (aged 33) | 99 | 27 | 126 | 31 | 5 | 36 |
| 11 | FW | (Honduras) Melvin Valladares | 14 July 1984 (aged 27) | 16 | 25 | 41 | 0 | 6 | 6 |
| 12 | MF | (Honduras) Ábner Méndez | 1 August 1988 (aged 23) | 0 | 8 | 8 | 0 | 0 | 0 |
| 13 | DF | (Honduras) Nery Medina | 5 August 1981 (aged 30) | – | 26 | – | 6 | 5 | 11 |
| 14 | FW | (Honduras) Roby Norales | 25 January 1991 (aged 21) | 15 | 24 | 39 | 4 | 4 | 8 |
| 16 | DF | (Honduras) Johnny Leverón | 7 February 1990 (aged 22) | 69 | 14 | 83 | 6 | 3 | 9 |
| 17 | MF | (Honduras) Júnior Padilla | 4 April 1992 (aged 20) | 18 | 9 | 27 | 2 | 0 | 2 |
| 18 | MF | (Honduras) Brayan Figueroa | 28 March 1992 (aged 20) | 0 | 12 | 12 | 0 | 0 | 0 |
| 19 | MF | (Honduras) César Oseguera | 20 July 1990 (aged 21) | 0 | 37 | 37 | 0 | 3 | 3 |
| 20 | MF | (Honduras) Amado Guevara | 2 May 1976 (aged 36) | 225 | 33 | 258 | 64 | 6 | 70 |
| 21 | MF | (Honduras) Alfredo Mejía | 3 April 1990 (aged 22) | 7 | 15 | 22 | 0 | 1 | 1 |
| 22 | GK | (Honduras) Donaldo Morales | 13 October 1982 (aged 29) | 94 | 35 | 129 | 0 | 0 | 0 |
| 23 | FW | (Honduras) Eddie Hernández | 27 February 1991 (aged 21) | 0 | 23 | 23 | 0 | 7 | 7 |
| 24 | DF | (Honduras) Omar Elvir | 28 September 1989 (aged 22) | 46 | 27 | 73 | 0 | 1 | 1 |
| 25 | GK | (Honduras) Marlon Licona | 9 February 1991 (aged 21) | 11 | 0 | 11 | 0 | 0 | 0 |
| 26 | MF | (Honduras) Grodbin Benítez | 2 April 1993 (aged 19) | 0 | 0 | 0 | 0 | 0 | 0 |
| 28 | MF | (Honduras) Adán Ramírez | 28 August 1986 (aged 25) | 37 | 11 | 48 | 2 | 0 | 2 |
| 29 | MF | (Honduras) Marvin Barrios | 22 February 1994 (aged 18) | 5 | 27 | 32 | 1 | 1 | 2 |
| 30 | MF | (Honduras) Roger Mondragón | 20 September 1989 (aged 22) | 15 | 0 | 15 | 1 | 0 | 1 |
| 31 | DF | (Honduras) Esdras Padilla | 4 September 1989 (aged 22) | 39 | 1 | 40 | 0 | 0 | 0 |
| 32 | MF | (Honduras) Ronald Martínez | 26 July 1990 (aged 21) | 39 | 2 | 41 | 2 | 0 | 2 |
| 33 | GK | (Honduras) Harold Fonseca | 8 October 1993 (aged 18) | 0 | 0 | 0 | 0 | 0 | 0 |
| 34 | MF | (Honduras) Ramón Amador | 23 January 1994 (aged 18) | 2 | 1 | 3 | 0 | 0 | 0 |
| 35 | FW | (Honduras) Javier Norales | 20 November 1992 (aged 19) | 0 | 0 | 0 | 0 | 0 | 0 |
| 35 | MF | (Honduras) Marvin Cálix | 6 January 1992 (aged 20) | 0 | 3 | 3 | 0 | 0 | 0 |
| 48 | FW | (Honduras) Árnold Meléndez | 23 August 1994 (aged 17) | 0 | 3 | 3 | 0 | 0 | 0 |
| 49 | DF | (Honduras) Joshua Nieto | 3 September 1994 (aged 17) | 0 | 6 | 6 | 0 | 0 | 0 |
| – | FW | (Honduras) Christian Martínez | 8 September 1990 (aged 21) | 0 | 0 | 0 | 0 | 0 | 0 |
| – | DF | (Honduras) Santos Crisanto | – | 0 | 2 | 2 | 0 | 0 | 0 |
| Managers | | (Mexico) José Treviño | 29 January 1960 (aged 52) | 19 September 2011 – 23 October 2012 | | | | | |
| Managers | | (Honduras) Reynaldo Clavasquín | 28 January 1972 (aged 40) | 23 October 2012 – 10 March 2013 | | | | | |
| Managers | | (Mexico) Juan Castillo | 31 January 1951 (aged 61) | 10 March 2013 – 20 May 2013 | | | | | |

== Results ==
=== Preseason and friendlies ===
| 15 July 2012 Friendly | Motagua (Honduras) | 0–0 | (Nicaragua) Real Estelí | El Paraíso, El Paraíso |
| 15:00 (UTC−06:00) | | | | Stadium: Estadio Oro Verde |

| 21 July 2012 Friendly | Hispano | 1–4 | Motagua |
| (UTC−06:00) |

| 22 July 2012 Friendly | Atlético Choloma | 2–2 | Motagua | Choloma, Cortés |
| 15:00 (UTC−06:00) | Garza 85'; Acosta 90+2' | | Guevara 7'; Nascimento 28' | Stadium: Estadio Rubén Deras |

| 22 December 2012 Friendly | Catacamas | 0–6 | Motagua | Catacamas, Olancho |
| (UTC−06:00) | | | Valladares; García; Ramírez | Stadium: Estadio Rubén Guifarro |

| 22 December 2012 Friendly | Atlético Olanchano | 1–4 | Motagua | Catacamas, Olancho |
| (UTC−06:00) | Escobar | | Nascimento; Guevara; Ramírez | Stadium: Estadio Rubén Guifarro |

| 29 December 2012 Friendly | Comayagua | 0–8 | Motagua | Comayagua, Comayagua |
| 16:00 (UTC−06:00) | | | | Stadium: Estadio Carlos Miranda |

| 29 December 2012 Friendly | Comayagua | 0–3 | Motagua | Comayagua, Comayagua |
| 18:00 (UTC−06:00) | | | | Stadium: Estadio Carlos Miranda |

| 5 January 2013 Friendly | Honduras | 2–3 | Motagua | El Progreso, Yoro |
| 18:00 (UTC−06:00) | Morales 18'; Aguilar 46' | | Nascimento 20' 44'; Medina 27' | Stadium: Estadio Humberto Micheletti |

| 12 January 2013 Friendly | Valle | 0–2 | Motagua | Langue, Valle |
| (UTC−06:00) | | | Nascimento; Medina |

=== Apertura ===
| 29 July 2012 Week 1 | Victoria | 2–1 | Motagua | Olanchito |
| 15:00 CST | Córdoba 16'; Ortiz 80' | Report | Discua 27' | Stadium: Estadio San Jorge; Attendance: 3,083; Referee: Orlando Hernández |

| 4 August 2012 Week 2 | Motagua | 2–0 | Platense | Tegucigalpa |
| 19:00 CST | Oseguera 12'; Welcome 70' | Report | | Stadium: Estadio Tiburcio Carías Andino; Attendance: 993; Referee: Erick Andino |

| 11 August 2012 Week 3 | Real España | 1–0 | Motagua | San Pedro Sula |
| 19:00 CST | Hansen 53' | Report | | Stadium: Estadio General Francisco Morazán; Attendance: 1,219; Referee: Héctor Rodríguez Starting XI: 1 – de León; 2 – Borjas; 4 – Izaguirre; 7 – Discua (substituted off) 74'; 9 – Welcome; 12 – Méndez (substituted off) 60'; 16 – Leverón; 19 – Oseguera; 20 – Guevara (substituted off) 39'; 21 – Mejía; 29 – Barrios; Substitutes; 11 – Valladares (substituted on) 39'; 10 – Nascimento (substituted on) 60'; 13 – Medina (substituted on) 74' |

| 16 August 2012 Week 4 | Motagua | 0–0 | Vida | Tegucigalpa |
| 19:00 CST | | Report | | Stadium: Estadio Tiburcio Carías Andino; Attendance: 452; Referee: Melvin Matamoros |

| 19 August 2012 Week 5 | Motagua | 2–2 | Olimpia | Tegucigalpa |
| 16:00 CST | Valladares 42'; Leverón 80' (pen.) | Report | Portillo 40'; Bruschi 62' | Stadium: Estadio Tiburcio Carías Andino; Attendance: 7,666; Referee: Héctor Rodríguez |

| 26 August 2012 Week 6 | Real Sociedad | 2–1 | Motagua | Tocoa |
| 14:00 CST | Ramírez 7'; Turcios 65' (pen.) | Report | 49' Norales | Stadium: Estadio Francisco Martínez Durón; Attendance: 2,996; Referee: Armando Castro |

| 1 September 2012 Week 7 | Marathón | 1–1 | Motagua | San Pedro Sula |
| 15:30 CST | Meza 34' (pen.) | Report | Morán 19' | Stadium: Estadio Yankel Rosenthal; Attendance: 1,077; Referee: Raúl Castro |

| 9 September 2012 Week 8 | Motagua | 1–1 | Deportes Savio | Tegucigalpa |
| 16:00 CST | Guevara 13' | Report | Galdámez 72' | Stadium: Estadio Tiburcio Carías Andino; Attendance: 1,026; Referee: Manuel Zelaya |

| 15 September 2012 Week 9 | Atlético Choloma | 1–2 | Motagua | Choloma |
| 16:30 CST | Torlacoff 48' | Report | Morán 47'; Leverón 61' | Stadium: Estadio Rubén Deras; Attendance: 628; Referee: José Pineda |

| 23 September 2012 Week 10 | Motagua | 1–0 | Victoria | Tegucigalpa |
| 16:00 CST | Discua 54' | Report | | Stadium: Estadio Tiburcio Carías Andino; Attendance: 2,116; Referee: Melvin Matamoros |

| 30 September 2012 Week 11 | Platense | 0–0 | Motagua | Puerto Cortés |
| 15:00 CST | | Report | | Stadium: Estadio Excélsior; Attendance: 1,528; Referee: Geovanny Mendoza |

| 7 October 2012 Week 12 | Motagua | 1–1 | Real España | Tegucigalpa |
| 16:30 CST | Guevara 14' | Report | Hansen 80' (pen.) | Stadium: Estadio Tiburcio Carías Andino; Attendance: 2,126; Referee: Héctor Rodríguez |

| 13 October 2012 Week 13 | Vida | 2–2 | Motagua | La Ceiba |
| 19:30 CST | Zelaya 26' 60' | Report | Hernández 52' 89' | Stadium: Estadio Nilmo Edwards; Attendance: 2,517; Referee: Saíd Martínez |

| 20 October 2012 Week 14 | Olimpia | 2–0 | Motagua | Tegucigalpa |
| 19:30 CST | Rojas 32' 50' | Report | | Stadium: Estadio Tiburcio Carías Andino; Attendance: 3,475; Referee: Melvin Matamoros |

| 28 October 2012 Week 15 | Motagua | 2–0 | Real Sociedad | Tegucigalpa |
| 16:00 CST | Oseguera 16'; Guevara 28' | Report | | Stadium: Estadio Tiburcio Carías Andino; Attendance: 1,734; Referee: Orlando Hernández |

| 4 November 2012 Week 16 | Motagua | 4–0 | Marathón | Tegucigalpa |
| 16:00 CST | Leverón 20' (pen.); Discua 32' 54'; Hernández 75' | Report | | Stadium: Estadio Tiburcio Carías Andino; Attendance: 3,629; Referee: Armando Castro |

| 8 November 2012 Week 17 | Deportes Savio | 0–1 | Motagua | Santa Rosa de Copán |
| 18:30 CST | | Report | Welcome 61' | Stadium: Estadio Sergio Antonio Reyes; Attendance: 856; Referee: Geovanny Mendoza |

| 11 November 2012 Week 18 | Motagua | 0–0 | Atlético Choloma | Tegucigalpa |
| 15:00 CST | | Report | | Stadium: Estadio Tiburcio Carías Andino; Attendance: 3,433; Referee: Héctor Rodríguez |

| 15 November 2012 Playoffs | Real España | 1–4 | Motagua | San Pedro Sula |
| 19:00 CST | Lobo 38' | Report | Guevara 4'; Molina 17'; Welcome 23'; Medina 56' | Stadium: Estadio Olímpico Metropolitano; Attendance: 7,666; Referee: Armando Castro |

| 21 November 2012 Playoffs | Motagua | 3–2 | Real España | Tegucigalpa |
| 19:30 CST | Valladares 7'; Welcome 30' (pen.); Medina 76' | Report | Rodas 47'; Alvarado 50' | Stadium: Estadio Tiburcio Carías Andino; Attendance: 2,982; Referee: Melvin Matamoros |

| 25 November 2012 Semifinals | Motagua | 1–1 | Victoria | Tegucigalpa |
| 16:00 CST | Medina 31' | Report | Arias 57' | Stadium: Estadio Tiburcio Carías Andino; Attendance: 9,533; Referee: Erick Andino |

| 2 December 2012 Semifinals | Victoria | 2–2 | Motagua | La Ceiba |
| 14:00 CST | Licona 34'; Molina 75' (o.g.) | Report | Medina 2'; Oseguera 60' | Stadium: Estadio Nilmo Edwards; Attendance: 7,338; Referee: Héctor Rodríguez |

=== Clausura ===
| 20 January 2013 Round 1 | Motagua | 0–1 | Real Sociedad | Choluteca, Choluteca |
| 15:00 (UTC−06:00) | | Report | Güity 90+1' | Stadium: Estadio Fausto Flores Lagos; Attendance: 2,614; Referee: Erick Andino |

| 27 January 2013 Round 2 | Deportes Savio | 3–2 | Motagua | Santa Rosa de Copán, Copán |
| 14:00 (UTC−06:00) | Arriola 18'; Pinto 73'; Pineda 89' | Report | Nascimento 37'; Mejía 45' | Stadium: Estadio Sergio Antonio Reyes; Attendance: 844; Referee: Orlando Hernández |

| 30 January 2013 Round 3 | Motagua | 0–0 | Real España | Tegucigalpa, Francisco Morazán |
| 19:00 (UTC−06:00) | | Report | | Stadium: Estadio Tiburcio Carías Andino; Attendance: 1,794; Referee: Saíd Martínez |

| 3 February 2013 Round 4 | Vida | 0–3 | Motagua | La Ceiba, Atlántida |
| 15:00 (UTC−06:00) | | Report | Nascimento 18'; Guevara 59'; Norales 90+1' | Stadium: Estadio Nilmo Edwards; Attendance: 806; Referee: Héctor Rodríguez |

| 10 February 2013 Round 5 | Olimpia | 1–0 | Motagua | Tegucigalpa, Francisco Morazán |
| 15:00 (UTC−06:00) | Caetano 74' | Report | | Stadium: Estadio Tiburcio Carías Andino; Attendance: 5,969; Referee: Héctor Rodríguez |

| 14 February 2013 Round 6 | Motagua | 1–0 | Atlético Choloma | Tegucigalpa, Francisco Morazán |
| 19:00 (UTC−06:00) | Nascimento 61' | Report | | Stadium: Estadio Tiburcio Carías Andino; Attendance: 531; Referee: Raúl Castro |

| 17 February 2013 Round 7 | Motagua | 1–1 | Marathón | Tegucigalpa, Francisco Morazán |
| 16:00 (UTC−06:00) | Morán 63' | Report | Blanco 46' | Stadium: Estadio Tiburcio Carías Andino; Attendance: 2,114; Referee: Manuel Zelaya |

| 24 February 2013 Round 8 | Platense | 1–0 | Motagua | Puerto Cortés, Cortés |
| 15:00 (UTC−06:00) | Estupiñán 69' | Report | | Stadium: Estadio Excélsior; Attendance: 2,245; Referee: Erick Andino |

| 27 February 2013 Round 9 | Motagua | 1–1 | Victoria | Tegucigalpa, Francisco Morazán |
| 19:00 (UTC−06:00) | Valladares 4' | Report | Lacayo 40' | Stadium: Estadio Tiburcio Carías Andino; Attendance: 1,118; Referee: Saíd Martínez |

| 3 March 2013 Round 10 | Real Sociedad | 2–0 | Motagua | Tocoa, Colón |
| 13:00 (UTC−06:00) | Martínez 15' 80' | Report | | Stadium: Estadio Francisco Martínez Durón; Attendance: 1,416; Referee: Óscar Moncada |

| 6 March 2013 Round 11 | Motagua | 6–0 | Deportes Savio | Tegucigalpa, Francisco Morazán |
| 19:30 (UTC−06:00) | Medina 22'; Nascimento 28'; Guevara 36'; Norales 82'; Discua 86' 89' | Report | | Stadium: Estadio Tiburcio Carías Andino; Attendance: 853; Referee: Geovanny Mendoza |

| 9 March 2013 Round 12 | Real España | 2–1 | Motagua | San Pedro Sula, Cortés |
| 19:00 (UTC−06:00) | Cardozo 16' 52' | Report | Barahona 25' (o.g.) | Stadium: Estadio Francisco Morazán; Attendance: 4,038; Referee: Mario Moncada |

| 17 March 2013 Round 13 | Motagua | 3–0 | Vida | Tegucigalpa, Francisco Morazán |
| 16:00 (UTC−06:00) | Elvir 12'; Valladares 58'; Nascimento 84' | Report | | Stadium: Estadio Tiburcio Carías Andino; Attendance: 1,995; Referee: Saíd Martínez |

| 23 March 2013 Round 14 | Motagua | 2–3 | Olimpia | Tegucigalpa, Francisco Morazán |
| 19:30 (UTC−06:00) | Valladares 41'; Hernández 80' | Report | Oseguera 37' (o.g.); Mejía 60'; Portillo 63' | Stadium: Estadio Tiburcio Carías Andino; Attendance: 3,877; Referee: Armando Castro |

| 3 April 2013 Round 15 | Atlético Choloma | 0–3 | Motagua | Choloma, Cortés |
| 19:00 (UTC−06:00) | | Report | Valladares 5'; Norales 60'; Hernández 68' | Stadium: Estadio Rubén Deras; Attendance: 262; Referee: Óscar Moncada |

| 6 April 2013 Round 16 | Marathón | 5–0 | Motagua | San Pedro Sula, Cortés |
| 15:30 (UTC−06:00) | Figueroa 8' (o.g.); Castro 15'; Acevedo 55'; Flores 81'; Martínez 90+3' | Report | | Stadium: Estadio Yankel Rosenthal; Attendance: 1,084; Referee: Erick Andino |

| 14 April 2013 Round 17 | Motagua | 2–1 | Platense | Tegucigalpa, Francisco Morazán |
| 16:00 (UTC−06:00) | Barrios 7'; Hernández 53' | Report | Díaz 50' | Stadium: Estadio Tiburcio Carías Andino; Attendance: Miguel Torres; Referee: 1,514 |

| 20 April 2013 Round 18 | Victoria | 2–2 | Motagua | Olanchito, Yoro |
| 15:00 (UTC−06:00) | Rivera 10'; Ortiz 64' | Report | Welcome 49'; Hernández 51' | Stadium: Estadio San Jorge; Attendance: 853; Referee: Geovanny Mendoza |

== Statistics ==
- As of 20 April 2013

| Competition | GP | GW | GD | GL | GS | GC | GD | CS | SG | Per |
|---|---|---|---|---|---|---|---|---|---|---|
| League | 40 | 14 | 14 | 12 | 48 | 38 | +10 | 14 | 11 | 46.67% |
| Others | 9 | 7 | 2 | 0 | 32 | 6 | +26 | 5 | 1 | 85.19% |
| Totals | 49 | 21 | 16 | 12 | 80 | 44 | +36 | 19 | 12 | 53.74% |
