= 2011–12 C.D. Motagua season =

Motagua
2011–12 season
- Chairman: Pedro Atala
- Manager: Ramón Maradiaga; Luis Reyes; José Treviño
- Apertura: 7th
- Clausura: Semifinalist
- CONCACAF Champions League: Group stage
- Top goalscorer: League: Bengtson (11); All: Bengtson (13)
- Highest home attendance: 14,000
- Lowest home attendance: 99
- Average home league attendance: 3,235
Home colours	Away colours	Third colours
- All statistics correct as of 5 May 2012.

The 2011–12 C.D. Motagua season in the Honduran Liga Nacional was F.C. Motagua's 61st season in its history; the domestic league was divided into two tournaments, Apertura and Clausura. The Apertura started on 7 August, but due to its participation in the 2011–12 CONCACAF Champions League, their first official game was played on 28 July 2011. Motagua, as title holders, were looking for its 13th domestic championship, and its first CONCACAF achievement. The pre-season started on 20 June 2011.

== Overview ==
The club announced its first signing on 29 April 2011, Honduran striker Luis López arrived for a one-year contract. Also, 37-year-old goalkeeper Kerpo de León joined after a prominent performance at C.D.S. Vida. On 3 June, Honduran midfielder Carlos Discua was transferred from Guatemalan side C.S.D. Comunicaciones. In the evening of 15 June 2011, midfielder Jorge Claros was shot twice in the head and clavicle by two unidentified persons who tried to steal his car in a neighbor in San Pedro Sula, Claros escaped injured but in a stable condition. On 22 August, the club signed 22-year-old Colombian striker John Palacios from ASA.

Motagua's first game in the league was on 7 August at Estadio Fausto Flores Lagos against C.D. Necaxa losing 0–1. On 16 September, due to poor performance both in the league and the Champions League, the club's president Pedro Atala took the decision to separate Ramón Maradiaga as manager; leaving Luis Reyes as a temporary replacement. Three days later, on 19 September, Mexican coach José Treviño arrived as new manager for the rest of the season; while Colombian striker John Palacios left the team just one month after his signing arguing differences with teammates.

On 22 September, the club released a pink jersey to be worn on all the games from October, in a way to support the fight against breast cancer. On 3 October, striker Jerry Bengtson appeared 50th on The World's Top Goal Scorer 2011 list published by the IFFHS. On 11 October, the Disciplinary Commission forced Motagua to play its home game against C.D. Marathón in a neutral venue due to the incidents occurred on 9 October at the Estadio Tiburcio Carías Andino in the Honduran Superclásico against C.D. Olimpia where one unidentified Motagua fan throw an object to the field injuring rival's player Carlos Mejía at the end of the match; however, Motagua appeal to the decision and the penalization was revoked on 13 October.

On 19 November, Motagua was eliminated from the postseason despite winning the last four games in a row; this disqualification was the 13th in Motagua's history.

The Clausura tournament was scheduled to be played from January to May 2012. Manager José Treviño declared interest in signing Brazilian striker José Dias but later desisted; the club announced on 5 December 2011 to have signed Honduran strikers Georgie Welcome and Melvin Valladares who came from Mexican clubs Club Atlas and Dorados de Sinaloa respectively. One day later Arnold Peralta also joined from C.D.S. Vida but due to wages disagreements, the midfielder refused to sign. The Clausura fixtures were announced on 8 December, and Motagua faced C.D. Necaxa away on round 1.

In December 2011, the IFFHS published a list of "The World's Top Goal Scorer 2011", and Motagua's striker Jerry Bengtson appeared in the list ranked 24th.

Motagua initiated the Clausura tournament with a 2–2 away draw against Necaxa at Estadio Fausto Flores Lagos. In round 12, Motagua defeated Real C.D. España 2–0 at Tegucigalpa, breaking their own 1974 record for the longest unbeaten start in a season, streak that lasted until 5 May totaling 19 games undefeated. The qualification to the second round was acquired on 14 April at Estadio Yankel Rosenthal in the 0–1 away victory over C.D. Marathón. Motagua won two more games after that and became the second team in the history of the league that finished the regular season without defeats; C.D. Olimpia had already done it twice in 1969–70 and 1997–98 Clausura.

As second placed at the end of the regular season, Motagua obtained an automatic ticket to the semifinals; the opponent was decided from the previous round, where Marathón beat Vida. Once in the semifinals, Motagua were unable to surpass Marathón and lost 0–2 on aggregate score, this being the second consecutive time that they were prematurely eliminated. With only one defeat in the season, Motagua matched the records obtained in 1973–74 and 1999–2000 A. Also, due to great performance from both goalkeepers Donaldo Morales and Kerpo de León, Motagua broke its own record of fewest goals conceded in a season, with only 12; the previous record was 15 conceded goals in 1973–74.

In the Reserves tournament, the youth team captured the 2011–12 Clausura season.

== Players ==
=== Transfers in ===
No.	Pos.	Player	Moving from
1	GK	(Uruguay) Kerpo de León	(Honduras) Vida
7	MF	(Honduras) Carlos Discua	(Guatemala) Comunicaciones
9	FW	(Honduras) Luis López	(Serbia) FK Srem
33	FW	(Colombia) John Palacios	(Brazil) ASA
9	FW	(Honduras) Georgie Welcome	(Mexico) Atlas
10	MF	(Honduras) Julio de León	(China) Shandong Luneng
11	FW	(Honduras) Melvin Valladares	(Mexico) Dorados
12	MF	(Honduras) Luis Guzmán	(Honduras) Necaxa
13	DF	(Honduras) Nery Medina	(Honduras) Necaxa
21	MF	(Honduras) Alfredo Mejía	(Honduras) Real España

=== Transfers out ===
No.	Pos.	Player	Moving to
2	MF	(Honduras) Gustavo Alvarado	(United States) USA college scholarship
6	MF	(Honduras) David Álvarez	Free agent
9	FW	(Colombia) Mauricio Copete	(Honduras) Victoria
31	FW	(Honduras) Carlos Cruz	(United States) USA college scholarship
33	FW	(Colombia) John Palacios	(Peru) Inti Gas
3	DF	(Honduras) René Banegas	(Honduras) Deportes Savio
5	DF	(Honduras) Milton Reyes	Retired
8	MF	(Honduras) Jorge Claros	(Scotland) Hibernian
9	FW	(Honduras) Luis López	(Guatemala) Coatepeque
11	MF	(Guatemala) Guillermo Ramírez	(Guatemala) Heredia
12	DF	(Honduras) Iván Guerrero	(United States) Chicago Fire
13	MF	(Honduras) Mario Girón	(Honduras) Atlético Choloma
15	DF	(Honduras) Brayan García	TBD
21	FW	(Honduras) Aly Arriola	(Honduras) Deportes Savio
29	MF	(Honduras) Jorge Escobar	TBD
30	FW	(Honduras) Marty Wood	TBD

=== Squad ===
- Statistics as of 5 May 2012
- Only league matches into account

No.	Pos.	Player name	Date of birth and age	Games played			Goals scored		
				< 10/11	11/12	Total	< 10/11	11/12	Total
1	GK	(Uruguay) Kerpo de León	25 February 1974 (aged 37)	0	18	18	0	0	0
2	DF	(Honduras) Odis Borjas	3 October 1987 (aged 23)	21	30	51	0	0	0
3	DF	(Honduras) René Banegas	6 November 1990 (aged 20)	0	0	0	0	0	0
3	MF	(Honduras) Héctor García	11 March 1992 (aged 19)	0	0	0	0	0	0
4	DF	(Honduras) Júnior Izaguirre	12 August 1979 (aged 31)	236	32	268	31	1	32
5	DF	(Honduras) Milton Reyes	2 May 1974 (aged 37)	284	7	291	4	0	4
6	MF	(Honduras) Emilson Cruz	24 October 1987 (aged 23)	19	10	29	0	0	0
7	MF	(Honduras) Carlos Discua	20 July 1984 (aged 26)	0	30	30	0	8	8
8	MF	(Honduras) Jorge Claros	8 January 1986 (aged 25)	150	14	164	5	1	6
9	FW	(Honduras) Luis López	29 August 1986 (aged 24)	0	7	7	0	0	0
9	FW	(Honduras) Georgie Welcome	9 March 1985 (aged 26)	76	6	82	28	1	29
10 / 34	MF	(Honduras) Carlos Morán	19 July 1984 (aged 26)	9	15	24	1	1	2
10	MF	(Honduras) Julio de León	13 September 1979 (aged 31)	0	13	13	0	2	2
11	MF	(Guatemala) Guillermo Ramírez	26 March 1978 (aged 33)	16	8	24	3	0	3
11	FW	(Honduras) Melvin Valladares	14 July 1984 (aged 26)	0	16	16	0	0	0
12	DF	(Honduras) Iván Guerrero	30 November 1977 (aged 33)	195	15	210	5	0	5
12	DF	(Honduras) Luís Guzmán	19 December 1980 (aged 30)	–	1	–	5	0	5
13	MF	(Honduras) Mario Girón	28 March 1990 (aged 21)	12	4	16	1	0	1
13	DF	(Honduras) Nery Medina	5 August 1981 (aged 29)	–	11	–	6	0	6
14	FW	(Honduras) Roby Norales	25 January 1991 (aged 20)	0	15	15	0	4	4
15	DF	(Honduras) Brayan García	26 March 1993 (aged 18)	0	5	5	0	0	0
16	DF	(Honduras) Johnny Leverón	7 February 1990 (aged 21)	52	17	69	5	1	6
17	MF	(Honduras) Júnior Padilla	4 April 1992 (aged 19)	0	18	18	0	2	2
18	MF	(Honduras) Roger Mondragón	20 September 1989 (aged 21)	14	1	15	1	0	1
19	DF	(Honduras) Henry Figueroa	28 December 1992 (aged 18)	0	0	0	0	0	0
20	MF	(Honduras) Amado Guevara	2 May 1976 (aged 35)	192	33	225	60	4	64
21	FW	(Honduras) Aly Arriola	22 September 1989 (aged 21)	13	6	19	1	0	1
21	MF	(Honduras) Alfredo Mejía	3 April 1990 (aged 21)	0	7	7	0	0	0
22	GK	(Honduras) Donaldo Morales	13 October 1982 (aged 28)	75	19	94	0	0	0
23	DF	(Honduras) Sergio Mendoza	23 May 1981 (aged 30)	51	28	79	3	1	4
24	DF	(Honduras) Omar Elvir	28 September 1989 (aged 21)	26	20	46	0	0	0
25	GK	(Honduras) Marlon Licona	9 February 1991 (aged 20)	9	2	11	0	0	0
26 / 5	DF	(Honduras) David Molina	14 March 1988 (aged 23)	49	28	77	3	1	4
26	MF	(Honduras) Grodbin Benítez	2 April 1993 (aged 18)	0	0	0	0	0	0
27	FW	(Honduras) Jerry Bengtson	8 April 1987 (aged 24)	22	32	54	15	11	26
28	MF	(Honduras) Adán Ramírez	28 August 1986 (aged 24)	20	17	37	2	0	2
29	MF	(Honduras) Jorge Escobar	19 March 1991 (aged 20)	5	0	5	0	0	0
29	MF	(Honduras) Alejandro Aguiluz	11 October 1992 (aged 18)	6	0	6	1	0	1
30	FW	(Honduras) Marty Wood	27 February 1990 (aged 21)	0	1	1	0	0	0
31	DF	(Honduras) Esdras Padilla	4 September 1989 (aged 21)	35	4	39	0	0	0
32	MF	(Honduras) Ronald Martínez	26 July 1990 (aged 20)	18	21	39	1	1	2
33	FW	(Colombia) John Palacios	28 November 1988 (aged 22)	0	3	3	0	0	0
33	GK	(Honduras) Harold Fonseca	8 October 1993 (aged 17)	0	0	0	0	0	0
35	FW	(Honduras) Javier Norales	20 November 1992 (aged 18)	0	0	0	0	0	0
36	MF	(Honduras) Brayan Figueroa	28 March 1992 (aged 19)	0	0	0	0	0	0
52	MF	(Honduras) Marvin Barrios	22 February 1994 (aged 17)	0	5	5	0	1	1
63 / 30	MF	(Honduras) Mishek Ávila	12 January 1992 (aged 19)	0	10	10	0	1	1
–	DF	(Honduras) Yeer Gutiérrez	24 August 1992 (aged 18)	0	0	0	0	0	0
Managers		(Honduras) Ramón Maradiaga	30 October 1964 (aged 46)						
Managers		(Honduras) Luis Reyes	19 March 1958 (aged 53)						
Managers		(Mexico) José Treviño	29 January 1960 (aged 51)						

== Results ==
=== Preseason and friendlies ===
2 July 2011 Friendly	Marquense (Guatemala)	3–1	(Honduras) Motagua	San Marcos, Guatemala
12:00 (UTC−06:00)	de Oliveira 46' 52'; Murga 59'	Report	López 73'	Stadium: Estadio Marquesa de la Ensenada; Attendance: 3,000

3 July 2011 Friendly	Juventud Retalteca (Guatemala)	0–1	(Honduras) Motagua	Retalhuleu, Guatemala
11:00 (UTC−06:00)		Report	Norales 83'	Stadium: Estadio Dr. Óscar Monterroso Izaguirre; Attendance: 1,000

5 July 2011 Friendly	Comunicaciones (Guatemala)	2–1	(Honduras) Motagua	Guatemala City, Guatemala
19:00 (UTC−06:00)	Ramírez 15'; Márquez 78'	Report	Ramírez 83'	Stadium: Estadio Mateo Flores; Attendance: 1,684

10 July 2011 Friendly	Motagua	3–0	Real España	San Luis, Santa Bárbara
12:00 (UTC−06:00)	Guevara 41'; Ramírez 54'; Bengtson 65'	Report		Stadium: Estadio Fausto Rodríguez

15 July 2011 Friendly	Hispano	1–0	Motagua	Comayagua, Comayagua
18:00 (UTC−06:00)	Torlacoff 31'	Report		Stadium: Estadio Carlos Miranda

17 July 2011 Friendly	Alianza (El Salvador)	0–0	(Honduras) Motagua	San Salvador, El Salvador
15:00 (UTC−06:00)		Report		Stadium: Estadio Cuscatlán; Referee: Joel Aguilar (SLV)

23 July 2011 Friendly	Motagua	3–2	Olimpia	New Orleans, United States
19:30 (UTC−06:00)	Bengtson 35'; Ramírez 63'; Discua 78'	Report	Bruschi 25'; García 60'	Stadium: Tad Gormley Stadium; Attendance: 8,000

4 September 2011 Friendly	América (Mexico)	4–1	(Honduras) Motagua	New Orleans, United States
18:00 (UTC−06:00)	Sánchez 28' 41'; Martínez 45'; Corral 78'	Report	Guerrero 57'	Stadium: Tad Gormley Stadium; Attendance: 2,500

23 December 2011 Friendly	Motagua	2–0	Valencia	Tegucigalpa, Francisco Morazán
(UTC−06:00)				Stadium: Estadio Tiburcio Carías Andino

28 December 2011 Friendly	Platense	1–3	Motagua	Puerto Cortés, Cortés
19:00 (UTC−06:00)	Filho 31'		Leverón 18' 73'; Padilla 63'	Stadium: Estadio Excélsior

29 December 2011 Friendly	Atlético Choloma	1–1	Motagua	Choloma, Cortés
17:00 (UTC−06:00)	Oviedo 63'		Bengtson 53'	Stadium: Estadio Rubén Deras

30 December 2011 Friendly	Marathón	0–1	Motagua	San Pedro Sula, Cortés
10:00 (UTC−06:00)			Guevara 55'	Stadium: Estadio Yankel Rosenthal

=== Apertura ===
7 August 2011 Round 1	Necaxa	1–0	Motagua	Choluteca
15:00 CST	Bardales 17'	Report		Stadium: Estadio Fausto Flores Lagos; Attendance: 4,754; Referee: Melvin Matamoros Starting XI: 1 – de León; 2 – Borjas; 5 – Reyes (substituted off); 6 – Cruz (substituted off); 7 – Discua; 9 – López (substituted off); 13 – Girón; 15 – García; 21 – Arriola; 23 – Mendoza; 26 – Molina; Substitutes; 24 – Elvir (substituted on); 27 – Bengtson (substituted on); 8 – Claros (substituted on)

13 August 2011 Round 2	Atlético Choloma	1–1	Motagua	Choloma
18:00 CST	Güity 60'	Report	Guevara 22'	Stadium: Estadio Rubén Deras; Attendance: 2,090; Referee: Benigno Pineda

21 August 2011 Round 3	Marathón	2–1	Motagua	San Pedro Sula
15:30 CST	Discua 31' (o.g.); Vega 50'	Report	Bengtson 27' (pen.)	Stadium: Estadio Yankel Rosenthal; Attendance: 4,445; Referee: Miguel Torres

28 August 2011 Round 4	Motagua	2–0	Platense	Tegucigalpa
16:30 CST	Bengtson 30' 81'	Report		Stadium: Estadio Tiburcio Carías Andino; Attendance: 319; Referee: José Molina

9 October 2011 Round 5	Olimpia	1–1	Motagua	Tegucigalpa
16:00 CST	Tilguath 45' (pen.)	Report	Morán 25'	Stadium: Estadio Tiburcio Carías Andino; Attendance: 6,336; Referee: Geovanny Mendoza

7 September 2011 Round 6	Vida	2–0	Motagua	La Ceiba
19:30 CST	Nascimento 56'; Córdoba 88'	Report		Stadium: Estadio Nilmo Edwards; Attendance: 2,139; Referee: Benigno Pineda

12 October 2011 Round 7	Motagua	0–2	Real España	Tegucigalpa
19:30 CST		Report	Pavón 42'; Colón 88'	Stadium: Estadio Tiburcio Carías Andino; Attendance: 1,119; Referee: Orlando Hernández

18 September 2011 Round 8	Victoria	2–1	Motagua	La Ceiba
15:00 CST	Oliva 10'; Velásquez 90+2'	Report	Bengtson 35'	Stadium: Estadio Nilmo Edwards; Attendance: 877; Referee: Armando Castro

25 September 2011 Round 9	Motagua	2–1	Deportes Savio	Tegucigalpa
16:00 CST	Bengtson 34'; Claros 83'	Report	Rápalo 46'	Stadium: Estadio Tiburcio Carías Andino; Attendance: 3,467; Referee: Orlando Hernández

2 October 2011 Round 10	Motagua	1–1	Necaxa	Tegucigalpa
16:00 CST	Bengtson 64'	Report	Medina 16'	Stadium: Estadio Tiburcio Carías Andino; Attendance: 923; Referee: Ronald Hernández

5 October 2011 Round 11	Motagua	0–0	Atlético Choloma	Comayagua
18:00 CST		Report		Stadium: Estadio Carlos Miranda; Attendance: 1,607; Referee: Erick Andino

16 October 2011 Round 12	Motagua	1–4	Marathón	Tegucigalpa
16:00 CST	Padilla 89'	Report	Martínez 12' 25'; Berríos 16'; Cardozo 60'	Stadium: Estadio Tiburcio Carías Andino; Attendance: 724; Referee: Armando Castro

23 October 2011 Round 13	Platense	1–0	Motagua	Puerto Cortés
15:00 CST	Díaz 74'	Report		Stadium: Estadio Excélsior; Attendance: 1,238; Referee: Geovanny Mendoza

30 October 2011 Round 14	Motagua	0–1	Olimpia	Tegucigalpa
16:00 CST		Report	Bruschi 73'	Stadium: Estadio Tiburcio Carías Andino; Attendance: 6,042; Referee: Armando Castro

2 November 2011 Round 15	Motagua	3–0	Vida	Tegucigalpa
19:30 CST	Bengtson 18' 19'; Discua 42'	Report		Stadium: Estadio Tiburcio Carías Andino; Attendance: 99; Referee: Miguel Torres

5 November 2011 Round 16	Real España	0–1	Motagua	San Pedro Sula
19:30 CST		Report	Bengtson 51' (pen.)	Stadium: Estadio Francisco Morazán; Attendance: 3,941; Referee: Raúl Castro

13 November 2011 Round 17	Motagua	3–0	Victoria	Tegucigalpa
15:00 CST	Norales 37' 86'; Ávila 67'	Report		Stadium: Estadio Tiburcio Carías Andino; Attendance: 1,118; Referee: Héctor Rodríguez

19 November 2011 Round 18	Deportes Savio	0–3	Motagua	Santa Rosa de Copán
19:30 CST		Report	Discua 43'; Guevara 47'; Norales 83'	Stadium: Estadio Sergio Antonio Reyes; Attendance: 3,337; Referee: Geovanny Mendoza

=== Clausura ===
8 January 2012 Round 1	Necaxa	2–2	Motagua	Choluteca, Choluteca
15:00 (UTC−06:00)	Licona 48' (pen.); Urmeneta 61'	Report	Discua 10'; Leverón 32'	Stadium: Estadio Fausto Flores Lagos; Attendance: 3,030; Referee: Melvin Matamoros

14 January 2012 Round 2	Motagua	1–1	Platense	Tegucigalpa, Francisco Morazán
19:30 (UTC−06:00)	Discua 28'	Report	Cardona 14'	Stadium: Estadio Tiburcio Carías Andino; Attendance: 2,839; Referee: Saíd Martínez

21 January 2012 Round 3	Real España	1–1	Motagua	San Pedro Sula, Cortés
19:30 (UTC−06:00)	Pavón 65' (pen.)	Report	Guevara 49'	Stadium: Estadio Francisco Morazán; Attendance: 6,230; Referee: Armando Castro

29 January 2012 Round 4	Motagua	1–0	Atlético Choloma	Tegucigalpa, Francisco Morazán
16:00 (UTC−06:00)	Molina 50'	Report		Stadium: Estadio Tiburcio Carías Andino; Attendance: 7,148; Referee: Benigno Pineda

5 February 2012 Round 5	Olimpia	0–0	Motagua	Tegucigalpa, Francisco Morazán
16:00 (UTC−06:00)		Report		Stadium: Estadio Tiburcio Carías Andino; Attendance: 15,788; Referee: Armando Castro

8 February 2012 Round 6	Vida	1–1	Motagua	La Ceiba, Atlántida
19:30 (UTC−06:00)	Córdoba 14'	Report	de León 84'	Stadium: Estadio Nilmo Edwards; Attendance: 3,779; Referee: Geovanny Mendoza
Note: Midfielder Julio de León scored the club's 2000th goal in all official competitions.

12 February 2012 Round 7	Motagua	1–1	Marathón	Tegucigalpa, Francisco Morazán
16:00 (UTC−06:00)	de León 50'	Report	Ramírez 88'	Stadium: Estadio Tiburcio Carías Andino; Attendance: 3,370; Referee: Raúl Castro

19 February 2012 Round 8	Victoria	1–2	Motagua	La Ceiba, Atlántida
15:00 (UTC−06:00)	Mena 6'	Report	Norales 62'; Bengtson 76'	Stadium: Estadio Nilmo Edwards; Attendance: 1,569; Referee: Melvin Matamoros

26 February 2012 Round 9	Motagua	0–0	Deportes Savio	Tegucigalpa, Francisco Morazán
16:00 (UTC−06:00)		Report		Stadium: Estadio Tiburcio Carías Andino; Attendance: 1,169; Referee: Erick Andino

4 March 2012 Round 10	Motagua	2–0	Necaxa	Tegucigalpa, Francisco Morazán
16:00 (UTC−06:00)	Martínez 5'; Discua 52'	Report		Stadium: Estadio Tiburcio Carías Andino; Attendance: 1,206; Referee: Armando Castro Starting XI: 1 – K. de León; 4 – Izaguirre; 7 – Discua; 13 – Medina; 16 – Leverón; 20 – Guevara; 21 – Mejía; 23 – Mendoza; 24 – Elvir; 27 – Bengtson; 32 – Martínez; Substitutes; 5 – Molina (substituted on); 2 – Borjas (substituted on); 10 – J. de León (substituted on)

11 March 2012 Round 11	Platense	1–1	Motagua	Puerto Cortés, Cortés
15:00 (UTC−06:00)	López 49'	Report	Bengtson 71'	Stadium: Estadio Excélsior; Attendance: 2,089; Referee: Erick Andino

17 March 2012 Round 12	Motagua	2–0	Real España	Tegucigalpa, Francisco Morazán
19:30 (UTC−06:00)	Discua 22' 27'	Report		Stadium: Estadio Tiburcio Carías Andino; Attendance: 3,414; Referee: Héctor Rodríguez

21 March 2012 Round 13	Atlético Choloma	0–0	Motagua	Choloma, Cortés
19:30 (UTC−06:00)		Report		Stadium: Estadio Rubén Deras; Attendance: 815; Referee: Erick Andino

25 March 2012 Round 14	Motagua	0–0	Olimpia	Tegucigalpa, Francisco Morazán
15:00 (UTC−06:00)		Report		Stadium: Estadio Tiburcio Carías Andino; Attendance: 7,303; Referee: Raúl Castro

1 April 2012 Round 15	Motagua	1–1	Vida	Tegucigalpa, Francisco Morazán
16:00 (UTC−06:00)	Padilla 79'	Report	Córdoba 86'	Stadium: Estadio Tiburcio Carías Andino; Attendance: 1,827; Referee: Orlando Hernández

14 April 2012 Round 16	Marathón	0–1	Motagua	San Pedro Sula, Cortés
15:30 (UTC−06:00)		Report	Mendoza 29'	Stadium: Estadio Yankel Rosenthal; Attendance: 2,459; Referee: Héctor Rodríguez

18 April 2012 Round 17	Motagua	2–0	Victoria	Tegucigalpa, Francisco Morazán
19:30 (UTC−06:00)	Discua 21'; Guevara 58'	Report		Stadium: Estadio Tiburcio Carías Andino; Attendance: 1,290; Referee: José Molina

22 April 2012 Round 18	Deportes Savio	1–4	Motagua	Santa Rosa de Copán, Copán
15:00 (UTC−06:00)	Mejía 55'	Report	Izaguirre 17'; Barrios 34'; Welcome 40'; Galdámez 68' (o.g.)	Stadium: Estadio Sergio Antonio Reyes; Attendance: 1,699; Referee: Melvin Matamoros

2 May 2012 Semifinals	Marathón	0–0	Motagua	San Pedro Sula, Cortés
19:30 (UTC−06:00)		Report		Stadium: Estadio Olímpico Metropolitano; Attendance: 5,795; Referee: Héctor Rodríguez

5 May 2012 Semifinals	Motagua	0–2	Marathón	Tegucigalpa, Francisco Morazán
19:30 (UTC−06:00)		Report	Berríos 20'; Brown 76'	Stadium: Estadio Tiburcio Carías Andino; Attendance: 5,732; Referee: Raúl Castro

=== CONCACAF Champions League ===
As 2010–11 Clausura league champions, F.C. Motagua qualified to the Preliminary round of the 2011–12 CONCACAF Champions League. On 24 June 2011, CONCACAF announced the first stage schedule which paired Motagua against C.S.D. Municipal. On 4 August 2011, Motagua advanced to the Group phase after a 4–2 score on aggregate over Municipal. Once in the Group phase, things went upside down for Motagua and on 22 September, they were mathematically eliminated from quarterfinal contention after losing 0–2 against Monarcas Morelia at Estadio Tiburcio Carías Andino. At the end of the group phase, Motagua not only were eliminated, but finished last with zero points with a sixth straight loss.

28 July 2011 Preliminary round	Motagua (Honduras)	4–0	(Guatemala) Municipal	Tegucigalpa, Honduras
20:00 (UTC−06:00)	Bengtson 42'; Borjas 56'; Guevara 68'; Ramírez 73'	Report		Stadium: Estadio Tiburcio Carías Andino; Attendance: 6,000; Referee: Roberto Moreno (PAN) Starting XI: 22 – Morales; 2 – Borjas; 4 – Izaguirre; 7 – Discua (substituted off) 72'; 8 – Claros; 11 – Ramírez; 12 – Guerrero; 16 – Leverón; 20 – Guevara (substituted off) 79'; 27 – Bengtson (substituted off) 79'; 28 – Ramírez; Substitutes; 24 – Elvir (substituted on) 72'; 13 – Girón (substituted on) 79'; 21 – Arriola (substituted on) 79'

4 August 2011 Preliminary round	Municipal (Guatemala)	2–0	(Honduras) Motagua	Guatemala City, Guatemala
20:00 (UTC−06:00)	Romero 32' 43' (pen.)	Report		Stadium: Estadio Mateo Flores; Attendance: 1,500; Referee: Ricardo Arellano (MEX) Starting XI: 22 – Morales; 2 – Borjas; 4 – Izaguirre; 7 – Discua (substituted off) 79'; 8 – Claros; 11 – Ramírez (substituted off) 90'; 12 – Guerrero; 16 – Leverón; 20 – Guevara; 27 – Bengtson; 28 – Ramírez (substituted off) 80'; Substitutes; 23 – Mendoza (substituted on) 79'; 6 – Cruz (substituted on) 80'; 21 – Arriola (substituted on) 90'

16 August 2011 Group A	Los Angeles Galaxy (United States)	2–0	(Honduras) Motagua	Carson, United States
19:00 (UTC−08:00)	Cristman 12'; Donovan 60'	Report		Stadium: Home Depot Center; Attendance: 8,196; Referee: Enrico Wijngaarde (SUR) Starting XI: 22 – Morales; 4 – Izaguirre; 7 – Discua (substituted off) 63'; 8 – Claros; 11 – Ramírez (substituted off) 76'; 12 – Guerrero; 16 – Leverón; 20 – Guevara; 21 – Arriola (substituted off) 88'; 23 – Mendoza; 27 – Bengtson; Substitutes; 15 – García (substituted on) 63'; 31 – Padilla (substituted on) 76'; 6 – Cruz (substituted on) 88'

25 August 2011 Group A	Morelia (Mexico)	4–0	(Honduras) Motagua	Morelia, Mexico
21:00 (UTC−06:00)	Márquez 2'; Rojas 50'; Jiménez 70'; Lugo 72'	Report		Stadium: Estadio Morelos; Attendance: 5,463; Referee: Elmer Bonilla (SLV) Starting XI: 22 – Morales; 2 – Borjas; 4 – Izaguirre; 8 – Claros; 11 – Ramírez (substituted off) 63'; 15 – García; 16 – Leverón; 17 – Padilla; 20 – Guevara; 26 – Molina (substituted off) 46'; 27 – Bengtson; Substitutes; 7 – Discua (substituted on) 46'; 23 – Mendoza (substituted on) 63'

15 September 2011 Group A	Motagua (Honduras)	2–4	(Costa Rica) Alajuelense	Tegucigalpa, Honduras
20:00 (UTC−06:00)	Bengtson 5'; Guevara 67'	Report	Valle 41'; McDonald 51'; Guevara 84' 85'	Stadium: Estadio Tiburcio Carías Andino; Attendance: 1,928; Referee: Paul Delgadillo (MEX) Starting XI: 22 – Morales; 2 – Borjas; 8 – Claros; 11 – Ramírez (substituted off) 59'; 12 – Guerrero; 16 – Leverón; 17 – Padilla (substituted off) 59'; 20 – Guevara; 23 – Mendoza; 27 – Bengtson; 28 – Ramírez; Substitutes; 33 – Palacios (substituted on) 59'; 7 – Discua (substituted on) 59'

22 September 2011 Group A	Motagua (Honduras)	0–2	(Mexico) Morelia	Tegucigalpa, Honduras
20:00 (UTC−06:00)		Report	Corona 55'; Manso 58'	Stadium: Estadio Tiburcio Carías Andino; Attendance: 1,752; Referee: Javier Santos (PUR) Starting XI: 22 – Morales; 2 – Borjas (substituted off) 74'; 4 – Izaguirre; 5 – Reyes; 8 – Claros; 9 – López (substituted off) 46'; 11 – Ramírez (substituted off) 66'; 12 – Guerrero; 20 – Guevara; 23 – Mendoza; 27 – Bengtson; Substitutes; 28 – Ramírez (substituted on) 46'; 10 – Morán (substituted on) 66'; 17 – Padilla (substituted on) 74'

29 September 2011 Group A	Alajuelense (Costa Rica)	1–0	(Honduras) Motagua	Alajuela, Costa Rica
20:00 (UTC−06:00)	McDonald 27'	Report		Stadium: Estadio Alejandro Morera Soto; Attendance: 9,099; Referee: Valdin Legister (JAM) Starting XI: 1 – de León; 2 – Borjas; 5 – Reyes; 6 – Cruz (substituted off) 69'; 7 – Discua (substituted off) 46'; 9 – López; 10 – Morán; 16 – Leverón; 23 – Mendoza; 24 – Elvir (substituted off) 46'; 28 – Ramírez; Substitutes; 17 – Padilla (substituted on) 46'; 11 – Ramírez (substituted on) 46'; 18 – Mondragón (substituted on) 69'

20 October 2011 Group A	Motagua (Honduras)	0–1	(United States) Los Angeles Galaxy	Tegucigalpa, Honduras
20:00 (UTC−06:00)		Report	Juninho 29'	Stadium: Estadio Tiburcio Carías Andino; Attendance: 14,000; Referee: Walter López (GUA) Starting XI: 22 – Morales; 2 – Borjas; 6 – Cruz (substituted off) 75'; 7 – Discua; 8 – Claros; 13 – Girón (substituted off) 46'; 16 – Leverón; 18 – Mondragón (substituted off) 46'; 23 – Mendoza; 26 – Molina; 27 – Bengtson; Substitutes; 5 – Reyes (substituted on) 46'; 20 – Guevara (substituted on) 46'; 11 – Ramírez (substituted on) 75'
