= 2013–14 C.D. Motagua season =

Motagua
2013–14 season
- Chairman: Pedro Atala
- Manager: Risto Vidaković; Milton Reyes; Diego Vásquez
- Apertura: 9th
- Clausura: Playoffs
- Top goalscorer: League: Lombardi (5); All: Lombardi (5)
- Highest home attendance: 4,341
- Lowest home attendance: 990
- Average home league attendance: 2,930
Home colours	Away colours
- All statistics correct as of 10 November 2013.

The 2013–14 season was F.C. Motagua's 63rd season in existence and the club's 48th consecutive season in the top fight of Honduran football. The domestic league was divided into two tournaments, Apertura and Clausura. The Apertura was scheduled to be played in the second half of 2013, while the Clausura in the first half of 2014. Motagua were looking for its 13th domestic championship. Due to an unsuccessful 2012–13 season, the club won't have international participation.

== Overview ==
Right after being eliminated from the 2012–13 season, one of the club's director, Nelson Abdalah, announced that manager Juan Castillo would continue coaching for this season, nevertheless, on 20 May 2013, president Pedro Atala announced Serbian Risto Vidaković as the new club's manager. On 18 September 2013, the club released their new anthem called "Mi Corazón" (My Heart) interpreted by Luis Bustillo. On 6 November, Vidaković was sacked due to poor results and former player Milton Reyes took over.

== Players ==
=== Transfers in ===
Player	Contract date	Moving from
(Colombia) Luis Castro	14 May 2013	(Honduras) Marathón
(El Salvador) José Gutiérrez	15 May 2013	(El Salvador) Águila
(Honduras) Juan Montes	15 May 2013	(Honduras) Platense
(Honduras) Ricardo Canales	14 June 2013	(Honduras) Atlético Choloma
(Honduras) Orlin Peralta	26 June 2013	(Honduras) Vida
(Uruguay) Maximiliano Lombardi	4 July 2013	(Uruguay) Progreso
(Uruguay) José Varela	25 July 2013	(Ecuador) Liga de Loja
(Honduras) Jorge Claros	13 August 2013	(Scotland) Hibernian
(Honduras) Wilmer Crisanto	27 November 2013	(Honduras) Victoria
(Argentina) Sebastián Portigliatti	2 December 2013	(Argentina) Jorge Newbery
(Honduras) Román Castillo	4 December 2013	(Honduras) Vida
(Argentina) Eduardo Sosa	5 December 2013	(Argentina) Desamparados
(Honduras) Reinieri Mayorquín	9 December 2013	(Honduras) Lepaera
(Honduras) Víctor Ortiz	16 December 2013	(Honduras) Victoria
(Honduras) Irvin Reyna	26 December 2013	(Honduras) Olimpia

=== Transfers out ===
Player	Released date	Moving to
(Honduras) Odis Borjas	30 April 2013	(Honduras) Platense
(Uruguay) Kerpo de León	30 April 2013	Retired
(Honduras) Roger Mondragón	30 April 2013	(Honduras) Vida
(Honduras) Carlos Morán	30 April 2013	(Honduras) Vida
(Brazil) Jocimar Nascimento	30 April 2013	(Tajikistan) Istiqlol Dushanbe
(Honduras) Adán Ramírez	30 April 2013	TBD
(Honduras) Esdras Padilla	30 May 2013	TBD
(Honduras) Eduardo Sánchez	30 May 2013	TBD
(Honduras) Amado Guevara	13 June 2013	(Honduras) Icevic B (basketball)
(Honduras) Donaldo Morales	13 June 2013	(Guatemala) Malacateco
(Honduras) Emilson Cruz	12 July 2013	TBD
(Honduras) Ronald Martínez	12 July 2013	TBD
(Honduras) Shannon Welcome	12 July 2013	(Honduras) Vida
(Honduras) Nery Medina	21 July 2013	(Honduras) Olimpia
(Honduras) Georgie Welcome	2 December 2013	(Honduras) Platense
(Honduras) Roby Norales	2 December 2013	(Honduras) Vida
(El Salvador) José Gutiérrez	2 December 2013	(El Salvador) Alianza
(Honduras) Grodbin Benítez	2 December 2013	TBD
(Honduras) Ricardo Canales	2 December 2013	(Honduras) Vida
(Honduras) Brayan Figueroa	2 December 2013	TBD
(Honduras) Melvin Valladares	2 December 2013	(Honduras) Victoria
(Honduras) Marvin Cálix	2 December 2013	TBD
(Honduras) Eddie Hernández	4 December 2013	(Honduras) Vida
(Honduras) Alfredo Mejía	26 December 2013	(Honduras) Marathón

=== Squad ===
- Statistics as of 20 April 2014

A#	C#	Pos.	Player	DoB	As of 2012–13		2013–14		Totals	
1	–	GK	(Honduras) Ricardo Canales	30 May 1982 (aged 31)	89	0	4	0	93	0
–	1	GK	(Argentina) Sebastián Portigliatti	1 March 1985 (aged 28)	0	0	18	0	18	0
2	2	DF	(Honduras) Juan Montes	26 October 1985 (aged 27)	0	0	18	1	18	1
3	3	DF	(Honduras) Henry Figueroa	28 December 1992 (aged 20)	3	0	32	1	35	1
4	4	DF	(Honduras) Júnior Izaguirre	12 August 1979 (aged 33)	300	32	26	1	326	33
5	5	DF	(Honduras) David Molina	14 March 1988 (aged 25)	99	5	1	0	100	5
6	–	MF	(Honduras) Marvin Barrios	22 February 1994 (aged 19)	32	2	9	0	41	2
7	7	MF	(Honduras) Carlos Discua	20 September 1984 (aged 28)	63	14	34	7	97	21
8	8	MF	(Honduras) Jorge Claros	8 January 1986 (aged 27)	140	6	24	0	164	6
9	–	FW	(Honduras) Georgie Welcome	9 March 1985 (aged 28)	107	34	15	4	122	38
–	9	FW	(Honduras) Román Castillo	20 November 1991 (aged 21)	0	0	19	5	19	5
10	10	MF	(Uruguay) Maximiliano Lombardi	11 May 1987 (aged 26)	0	0	33	9	33	9
11	–	MF	(Honduras) Melvin Valladares	14 July 1984 (aged 29)	41	6	14	1	55	7
–	11	FW	(Argentina) Eduardo Sosa	16 May 1982 (aged 31)	0	0	12	1	12	1
12	–	MF	(El Salvador) José Gutiérrez	21 October 1989 (aged 23)	0	0	9	0	9	0
–	12	MF	(Honduras) Reinieri Mayorquín	13 July 1989 (aged 24)	0	0	13	1	13	1
13	–	MF	(Honduras) Grodbin Benítez	2 April 1993 (aged 20)	0	0	2	0	2	0
14	–	FW	(Honduras) Roby Norales	25 January 1991 (aged 22)	39	8	7	0	46	8
–	14	MF	(Honduras) Irvin Reyna	7 June 1987 (aged 26)	0	0	13	0	13	0
15	–	MF	(Honduras) Marvin Cálix	6 January 1992 (aged 21)	3	0	0	0	3	0
16	16	DF	(Colombia) Luis Castro	28 July 1985 (aged 28)	0	0	11	0	11	0
17	–	MF	(Honduras) Júnior Padilla	4 April 1992 (aged 21)	27	2	23	2	50	4
18	–	DF	(Honduras) Brayan Figueroa	28 March 1992 (aged 21)	12	0	5	0	17	0
–	18	DF	(Honduras) Wilmer Crisanto	24 June 1989 (aged 24)	0	0	18	0	18	0
19	19	DF	(Honduras) César Oseguera	20 July 1990 (aged 23)	37	3	19	2	56	5
21	–	MF	(Honduras) Alfredo Mejía	3 April 1990 (aged 23)	22	1	7	1	29	2
22	22	FW	(Uruguay) José Varela	29 May 1988 (aged 25)	0	0	29	7	29	7
23	–	FW	(Honduras) Eddie Hernández	27 February 1991 (aged 22)	23	7	12	0	35	7
24	24	DF	(Honduras) Omar Elvir	28 September 1989 (aged 23)	73	1	7	1	80	2
25	25	GK	(Honduras) Marlon Licona	9 February 1991 (aged 22)	11	0	16	0	27	0
26	26	DF	(Honduras) José García	23 December 1990 (aged 22)	0	0	15	0	15	0
27	27	DF	(Honduras) Orlin Peralta	12 February 1990 (aged 23)	0	0	22	0	22	0
28	–	DF	(Honduras) Carlos Turcios	3 February 1993 (aged 20)	0	0	0	0	0	0
29	–	DF	(Honduras) Brayan García	26 May 1993 (aged 20)	5	0	0	0	5	0
–	29	FW	(Honduras) Víctor Ortiz	21 May 1990 (aged 23)	0	0	14	0	14	0
31	–	MF	(Honduras) Ramón Amador	23 January 1994 (aged 19)	3	0	0	0	3	0
33	–	GK	(Honduras) Harold Fonseca	8 October 1993 (aged 19)	0	0	0	0	0	0
48	–	FW	(Honduras) Arnold Meléndez	23 August 1994 (aged 18)	3	0	4	0	7	0
49	–	DF	(Honduras) Joshua Nieto	3 September 1994 (aged 18)	6	0	0	0	6	0
–	–	DF	(Honduras) Santos Crisanto	–	2	0	0	0	2	0
–	–	MF	(Honduras) Deybi Flores	16 June 1996 (aged 17)	0	0	9	0	9	0
–	–	FW	(Honduras) Dembor Bengtson	3 September 1994 (aged 18)	0	0	4	0	4	0
–	–	FW	(Honduras) Kevin López	3 February 1996 (aged 17)	0	0	1	1	1	1
Managers			(Serbia) Risto Vidaković	5 January 1969 (aged 44)	20 May 2013 – 6 November 2013					
Managers			(Honduras) Milton Reyes (interim)	2 May 1974 (aged 39)	6 November 2013 – 23 November 2013					
Managers			(Argentina) Diego Vásquez	3 July 1971 (aged 42)	23 November 2013–					

=== Reserve Team Squad ===
- Statistics as of 2 December 2013

A#	C#	Pos.	Player	DoB	As of 2012–13		2013–14		Totals	
28	–	DF	(Honduras) Carlos Turcios	3 February 1993 (aged 20)	0	0	0	0	0	0
29	–	DF	(Honduras) Brayan García	26 May 1993 (aged 20)	5	0	0	0	5	0
31	–	MF	(Honduras) Ramón Amador	23 January 1994 (aged 19)	3	0	0	0	3	0
33	–	GK	(Honduras) Harold Fonseca	8 October 1993 (aged 19)	0	0	0	0	0	0
48	–	FW	(Honduras) Arnold Meléndez	23 August 1994 (aged 18)	3	0	3	0	6	0
49	–	DF	(Honduras) Joshua Nieto	3 September 1994 (aged 18)	6	0	0	0	6	0

== Results ==
=== Preseason and friendlies ===
22 June 2013 Friendly	Motagua (Honduras)	1–1	(Nicaragua) Juventus	Estadio Birichiche
	Hernández 4'	Tiempo.hn	90' Martínez

29 June 2013 Friendly	Motagua (Honduras)	2–0	(Nicaragua) Real Estelí	Estadio Marcelo Tinoco
	Discua 30' (pen.); Welcome 78'	LaPrensa.hn		Referee: Saíd Martínez

7 July 2013 Friendly	Comayagua	1–5	Motagua	Estadio Carlos Miranda
	Meza 57'		44' (pen.) Discua (?) Figueroa; 77' (o.g.) Raudales (?) Padilla; 88' Hernández

13 July 2013 Friendly	León Libertador	1–5	Motagua	Estadio Fausto Flores Lagos
	Coello		Norales; Gutiérrez; Valladares; Welcome

17 July 2013 Friendly	Motagua	2–0	Pumas San Isidro	Estadio Birichiche
	Hernández; Gutiérrez

20 July 2013 Friendly	Honduras	2–2	Motagua	Estadio Humberto Micheletti
			50' 60' Welcome

27 July 2013 Friendly	Marathón	0–1	Motagua	Estadio Carlos Miranda
			35' Norales	Attendance: ~150

31 July 2013 Friendly	Alianza (El Salvador)	0–0	(Honduras) Motagua	Estadio Jorge "Mágico" González

30 December 2013 Friendly	Motagua	5–1	Atlético Independiente	Complejo Pedro Atala
	Castillo; Figueroa; Sosa; Crisanto; Varela

5 January 2014 Friendly	Comayagua	0–3	Motagua	Estadio Carlos Miranda
			Castillo

=== Apertura ===
11 August 2013 Round 1	Deportes Savio	1–0	Motagua	Estadio Sergio Antonio Reyes
	Lasso 27'	Soccerway		Attendance: 1,349; Referee: Orlando Hernández

14 August 2013 Round 2	Motagua	4–2	Vida	Estadio Tiburcio Carías Andino
	Welcome 10' 28'; Varela 59'; Oseguera 90+4'	Soccerway	24' Castillo; 90+1' Quioto	Attendance: 2,477; Referee: Erick Andino

18 August 2013 Round 3	Marathón	1–1	Motagua	Estadio Yankel Rosenthal
	Flores 35'	Soccerway	12' Valladares	Attendance: 2,309; Referee: Manuel Zelaya

25 August 2013 Round 4	Motagua	3–3	Real Sociedad	Estadio Tiburcio Carías Andino
	Discua 32'; Figueroa 35'; Lombardi 53'	Soccerway	62' (pen.) González; 79' Munguía; 87' Zelaya	Attendance: 4,341; Referee: Geoby Martínez

1 September 2013 Round 5	Olimpia	2–1	Motagua	Estadio Tiburcio Carías Andino
	Bermúdez 10'; Mejía 34'	Soccerway	66' Discua	Attendance: 5,142; Referee: Raúl Castro

8 September 2013 Round 6	Parrillas One	1–2	Motagua	Estadio León Gómez
	Parham 74'	Soccerway	44' Lombardi; 60' Discua	Attendance: 2,250; Referee: Armando Castro

18 September 2013 Round 7	Motagua	2–1	Real España	Estadio Tiburcio Carías Andino
	Montes 45+2'; Varela 55'	Soccerway	33' Rodas	Attendance: 3,228; Referee: Miguel Torres

22 September 2013 Round 8	Victoria	3–2	Motagua	Estadio Nilmo Edwards
	Elvir 28'; Hoyos 57' 90'; Ortiz (penalty missed)	Soccerway	16' Varela; 29' Lombardi	Attendance: 822; Referee: Óscar Moncada

29 September 2013 Round 9	Motagua	2–2	Platense	Estadio Tiburcio Carías Andino
	Welcome 33' 77'	Soccerway	62' (pen.) 72' de León	Attendance: 2,937; Referee: Erick Andino

2 October 2013 Round 10	Motagua	0–1	Deportes Savio	Estadio Tiburcio Carías Andino
		Soccerway	90+1' (pen.) Fortín	Attendance: 990; Referee: Ronald Hernández

6 October 2013 Round 11	Vida	2–1	Motagua	Estadio Nilmo Edwards
	Castillo 10'; Montero 29'	Soccerway	36' (pen.) Lombardi	Attendance: 1,131; Referee: Melvin Matamoros

13 October 2013 Round 12	Motagua	3–2	Marathón	Estadio Tiburcio Carías Andino
	Welcome 6'; Padilla 55'; Oseguera 72'	Soccerway	12' Berríos; 90+1' Osorio	Referee: Orlando Hernández

20 October 2013 Round 13	Real Sociedad	1–1	Motagua	Estadio Francisco Martínez Durón
	Clark 34'	Soccerway	84' (pen.) Discua	Referee: Héctor Rodríguez

27 October 2013 Round 14	Motagua	2–1	Olimpia	Estadio Tiburcio Carías Andino
	Lombardi 46'; Varela 69'	Soccerway	80' Bruschi	Referee: Melvin Matamoros

30 October 2013 Round 15	Motagua	0–0	Parrillas One	Estadio Tiburcio Carías Andino
		Soccerway		Referee: Jorge Topete

3 November 2013 Round 16	Real España	2–0	Motagua	Estadio Francisco Morazán
	Cardozo 20' (pen.); Martínez 65'	Soccerway		Referee: Armando Castro

6 November 2013 Round 17	Motagua	1–1	Victoria	Estadio Tiburcio Carías Andino
	Discua 70'	Soccerway	30' (pen.) Guaita	Referee: Melvin Matamoros

10 November 2013 Round 18	Platense	1–0	Motagua	Estadio Excélsior
	García 11'	Soccerway		Referee: Erick Andino

=== Clausura ===
12 January 2014 Round 1	Deportes Savio	0–1	Motagua	Estadio Sergio Antonio Reyes
		Soccerway	19' Mayorquín	Attendance: 1,297; Referee: Melvin Matamoros

19 January 2014 Round 2	Motagua	1–0	Real Sociedad	Estadio Carlos Miranda
	Izaguirre 14'	Soccerway		Attendance: 5,190; Referee: Geovanny Mendoza

25 January 2014 Round 3	Marathón	3–3	Motagua	Estadio Olímpico Metropolitano
	Reyes 15'; Mejía 57'; Martínez 81'	Soccerway	31' Discua; 49' Varela; 88' (pen.) Castillo	Referee: Héctor Rodríguez

29 January 2014 Round 4	Motagua	0–0	Platense	Estadio Carlos Miranda
		Soccerway		Referee: Orlando Hernández

2 February 2014 Round 5	Olimpia	0–0	Motagua	Estadio Tiburcio Carías Andino
		Soccerway		Referee: Óscar Moncada

5 February 2014 Round 6	Victoria	1–0	Motagua	Estadio Nilmo Edwards
	Castro 88' (o.g.)	Soccerway		Referee: Héctor Rodríguez

9 February 2014 Round 7	Motagua	1–1	Real España	Estadio Tiburcio Carías Andino
	Castillo 38'	Soccerway	81' Alemán	Referee: Mario Moncada

15 February 2014 Round 8	Vida	0–1	Motagua	Estadio Nilmo Edwards
		Soccerway	28' Varela	Referee: Raúl Castro

23 February 2014 Round 9	Motagua	0–2	Parrillas One	Estadio Tiburcio Carías Andino
		Soccerway	86' Estupiñán; 90+4' Córdoba	Referee: Manuel Zelaya

2 March 2014 Round 10	Motagua	1–0	Deportes Savio	Estadio Tiburcio Carías Andino
	Varela 38'	Soccerway		Referee: Erick Andino

9 March 2014 Round 11	Real Sociedad	3–2	Motagua	Estadio Francisco Martínez Durón
	R. Martínez 42'; H. Martínez 66'; Zelaya 78'	Soccerway	15' Discua; 87' Castillo	Referee: Miguel Torres

15 March 2014 Round 12	Motagua	1–1	Marathón	Estadio Tiburcio Carías Andino
	Castillo 19'	Soccerway	56' (pen.) Berríos	Referee: Óscar Moncada

19 March 2014 Round 13	Platense	0–1	Motagua	Estadio Excélsior
		Soccerway	80' Lombardi	Referee: Miguel Torres

23 March 2014 Round 14	Motagua	0–1	Olimpia	Estadio Tiburcio Carías Andino
		Soccerway	81' Lozano	Referee: Héctor Rodríguez

26 March 2014 Round 15	Motagua	3–0	Victoria	Estadio Tiburcio Carías Andino
	Castillo 39'; Lombardi 54' 64'	Soccerway		Referee: Orlando Hernández

29 March 2014 Round 16	Real España	2–0	Motagua	Estadio Francisco Morazán
	Alemán 35'; Róchez 90+2'	Soccerway		Referee: Saíd Martínez

6 April 2014 Round 17	Motagua	3–1	Vida	Estadio Tiburcio Carías Andino
	Lombardi 36'; Valle 46' (o.g.); Sosa 48'	Soccerway	81' Alba	Referee: Óscar Moncada

13 April 2014 Round 18	Parrillas One	1–2	Motagua	Estadio León Gómez
	Córdoba 29'	Soccerway	3' Padilla; 90' López	Referee: Geovanny Mendoza

16 April 2014 Playoff	Marathón	2–1	Motagua	Estadio Francisco Morazán
	Espinoza 24'; Guevara 78'	Soccerway	42' Elvir	Referee: Saíd Martínez

20 April 2014 Playoff	Motagua	0–0	Marathón	Estadio Tiburcio Carías Andino
		Soccerway		Referee: Manuel Zelaya
