= Norales =

Norales is a Hispanic surname. Notable people with the surname include:

- Erick Norales (born 1985), Honduran football player
- Prudencio Norales (born 1956), Honduran football player
- Roby Norales (born 1991), Honduran football player

== See also ==
- Morales
