= Jerry Bengtson =

Honduran footballer (born 1987)

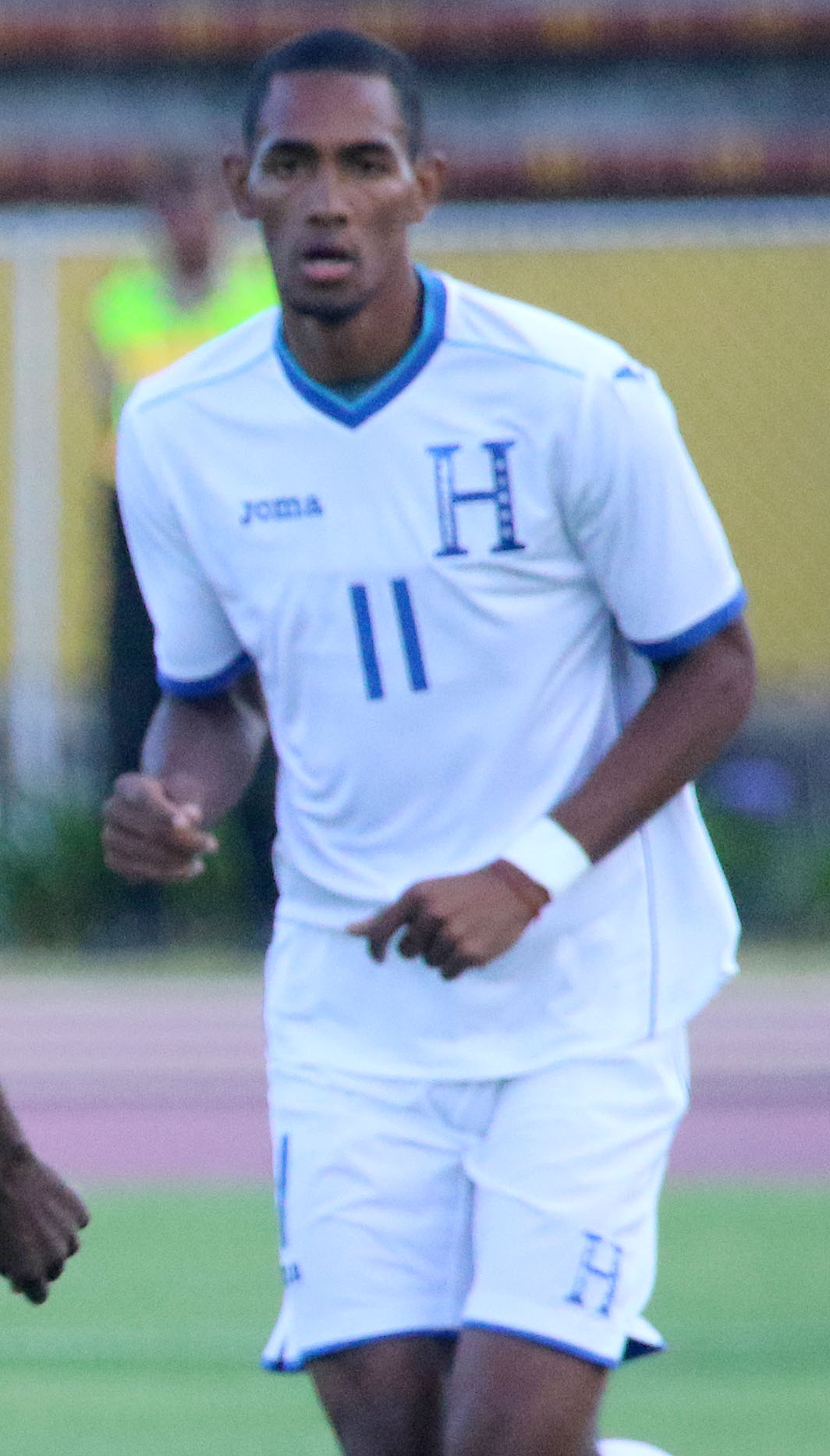
- Bengtson playing for Honduras

Personal information
- Full name: Jerry Ricardo Bengtson Bodden
- Date of birth: 8 April 1987 (age 39)
- Place of birth: Santa Rosa de Aguán, Honduras
- Height: 1.87 m (6 ft 2 in)
- Position: Striker

Team information
- Current team: Olancho FC
- Number: 27

Senior career*
Years	Team	Apps	(Gls)
2007–2010	Vida	81	(36)
2010–2012	Motagua	54	(26)
2012–2015	New England Revolution	36	(4)
2013–2014	→ Panionios (loan)	0	(0)
2014–2015	→ Belgrano (loan)	15	(1)
2015–2016	Persepolis	19	(7)
2016–2017	Zob Ahan	26	(8)
2017–2018	Saprissa	37	(9)
2018–2026	Olimpia	302	(143)
2026–	Olancho FC	2	(1)

International career^{‡}
2012	Honduras Olympic	4	(3)
2010–2024	Honduras	70	(23)
- * Club domestic league appearances and goals as of 24 August 2026 ‡ National team caps and goals as of 2 April 2024

Jerry Ricardo Bengtson Bodden (born 8 April 1987) is a Honduran professional footballer who plays as a striker for Liga Nacional club Olancho FC.

== Club career ==
=== Vida ===
On 12 August 2007, Bengtson made his official debut for C.D.S. Vida against Olimpia. He scored his first goal against Real España on 30 September 2007 in the 1–1 tie in San Pedro Sula. During his stay at Vida he scored 32 goals.

=== Motagua ===
On 26 November 2010, F.C. Motagua reached an agreement with Vida, for the acquisition of Bengtson, signing a three-year contract. He scored his first goal with Motagua on 30 January 2011 in the 1–0 win over C.D. Marathón.

On 8 May 2011, Bengtson scored his 13th goal of the Clausura Tournament in the first leg of the final against Olimpia. This goal put him in first place among the league's top scorers and enabled him to become the first Honduran-born player to achieve the feat in three consecutive tournaments after winning the previous two with C.D. Vida. He would go on to score two more goals in the second leg to solidify his title as the league's top scorer.

In the early part of 2012, Jerry suffered his worst goal drought in his career in Honduras, scoring only 2 goals in 18 games. With the forthcoming 2014 FIFA World Cup qualification, the lack of goals concerned the Honduran people. This was because of Jerry's role as main goalscorer in the Honduras National Football Team, due to Carlo Costly being a free agent making him unreliable.

=== New England Revolution ===
Bengtson was officially unveiled by New England as a Designated Player on 5 July 2012. He was the second Designated Player signing in the club's history, following the prior season's acquisition of Milton Caraglio, and the club's third all-time Designated Player. He was also the third Honduran player to suit up for the Revolution, following Álex Pineda Chacón and Mauricio Castro.

Bengtson made his Revolution debut on 8 July 2012, as a 60th-minute substitute for Blake Brettschneider. In that match, he scored his first Revolution goal, in the 84th minute in the Revolution's 2–0 win over the New York Red Bulls. He made a second appearance for the Revolution the following week as a substitute in the Revolution's 1–0 loss to Toronto FC, but then left for three weeks to join Honduras for the 2012 Olympic Games. Upon returning from the Olympics (in which he performed well, scoring three goals in four games) Bengtson made his first start on 12 August, in the Revolution's 1–0 loss to the Montreal Impact. In his first season with the Revolution, Bengtson made 13 appearances, scoring 2 goals.

Bengtson made 16 appearances during the 2013 New England Revolution season, scoring one goal, the game-winner in the season opener over the Chicago Fire on 9 March 2013. In August 2013, he joined Greek Super League club Panionios on loan.

Bengtson made only 7 appearances for his club during the 2014 New England Revolution season, again scoring only one goal, on 12 April in the Revolution's 2–0 win over the Houston Dynamo. On 25 July 2014, he joined Argentine Primera División side Belgrano on a one-year loan.

Despite thriving at the international level during his New England tenure, Bengtson did not live up to the Revolution's expectations, struggling to adapt to the team's playing style, and ultimately starting only 23 total matches and recording only four goals across three seasons. His goal against Houston proved to be Bengtson's final contribution to the Revolution, as on 16 June 2015, the Revolution agreed to mutually part ways with Bengtson, who was at the time still on loan to Belgrano.

=== Persepolis ===
Bengtson signed a one-year contract with Persepolis on 29 July 2015. He made his debut in the final 20 minutes of Persepolis' match against Sepahan. He scored his first goal for Persepolis on 25 September 2015 against Tractor Sazi. He scored Persepolis' only goal in a 1–1 draw against important rivals Esteghlal in the Tehran derby in stoppage time of second half.

Bengtson scored a brace on 22 April 2016, in a 2–0 victory against Esteghlal Ahvaz which kept Persepolis at the top of the table. Persepolis finished the season tied at the top of the table with Esteghlal, losing the title on goal difference.

=== Zob Ahan ===
Bengtson signed with Persian Gulf Pro League side Zob Ahan in July 2016, on a one-year contract.

=== Saprissa ===
On 31 May 2017, Bengston signed for Costa Rican club Saprissa, on a one-year contract. He had a controversial start to his career, getting suspended for a total of 6 games, for diving and insulting a referee.

He left Saprissa at the end of season, after beating Herediano in the final.

=== Olimpia ===
On 6 June 2018, Bengtson returned to Honduras joining Olimpia. In December 2021, Bengston scored the only goal in a 1–0 win against Real España, that crowned Olimpia as champions of the 2021 Apertura.

== International career ==
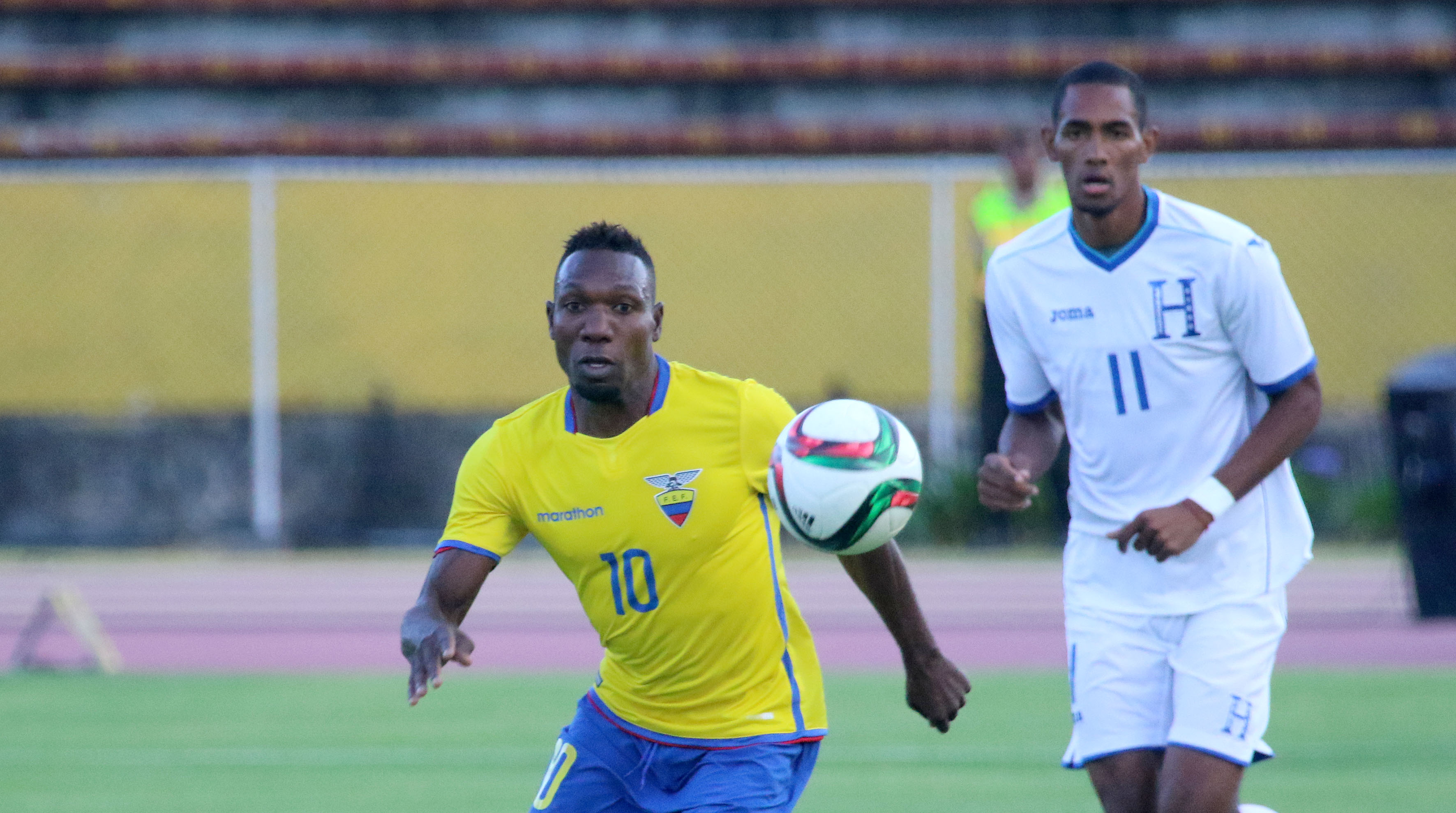
Bengston playing for Honduras against Ecuador, 8 September 2015

Bengtson made his debut for Honduras national team an April 2010 friendly match against Venezuela. He represented the nation at the 2012 London Olympics, the 2014 FIFA World Cup, and the CONCACAF Gold Cup in 2011, 2021 and 2023.

== Career statistics ==
=== International ===
As of match played 23 March 2024

Appearances and goals by national team and year
National team	Year	Apps	Goals
Honduras	2010	7	0
Honduras	2011	13	8
Honduras	2012	7	5
Honduras	2013	13	5
Honduras	2014	7	1
Honduras	2015	7	2
Honduras	2018	3	0
Honduras	2021	6	1
Honduras	2022	2	0
Honduras	2023	4	1
Honduras	2024	1	0
Total		70	23

Scores and results list Honduras' goal tally first, score column indicates score after each Bengtson goal.

List of international goals scored by Jerry Bengtson
No.	Date	Venue	Opponent	Score	Result	Competition	Ref.
1	9 February 2011	Estadio Nilmo Edwards, La Ceiba, Honduras	Ecuador	1–0	1–1	Friendly	
2	29 May 2011	Robertson Stadium, Houston, United States	El Salvador	2–0	2–2	Friendly	
3	10 June 2011	FIU Stadium, Miami, United States	Grenada	1–1	7–1	2011 CONCACAF Gold Cup	
4	10 June 2011	FIU Stadium, Miami, United States	Grenada	3–1	7–1	2011 CONCACAF Gold Cup	
5	18 June 2011	MetLife Stadium, East Rutherford, United States	Costa Rica	1–0	1–1	2011 CONCACAF Gold Cup	
6	11 October 2011	Estadio Nilmo Edwards, La Ceiba, Honduras	Jamaica	1–0	2–1	Friendly	
7	14 November 2011	Estadio Olímpico Metropolitano, San Pedro Sula, Honduras	Serbia	1–0	2–0	Friendly	
8	14 November 2011	Estadio Olímpico Metropolitano, San Pedro Sula, Honduras	Serbia	2–0	2–0	Friendly	
9	7 September 2012	Pedro Marrero Stadium, Havana, Cuba	Cuba	1–0	3–0	2014 FIFA World Cup qualification	
10	11 September 2012	Estadio Olímpico Metropolitano, San Pedro Sula, Honduras	Cuba	1–0	1–0	2014 FIFA World Cup qualification	
11	16 October 2012	Estadio Olímpico Metropolitano, San Pedro Sula, Honduras	Canada	1–0	8–1	2014 FIFA World Cup qualification	
12	16 October 2012	Estadio Olímpico Metropolitano, San Pedro Sula, Honduras	Canada	2–0	8–1	2014 FIFA World Cup qualification	
13	16 October 2012	Estadio Olímpico Metropolitano, San Pedro Sula, Honduras	Canada	7–1	8–1	2014 FIFA World Cup qualification	
14	18 January 2013	National Stadium, San José, Costa Rica	El Salvador	1–0	1–1	2013 Copa Centroamericana	
15	6 February 2013	Estadio Olímpico Metropolitano, San Pedro Sula, Honduras	United States	2–1	2–1	2014 FIFA World Cup qualification	
16	22 March 2013	Estadio Olímpico Metropolitano, San Pedro Sula, Honduras	Mexico	2–2	2–2	2014 FIFA World Cup qualification	
17	6 September 2013	Estadio Azteca, Mexico City, Mexico	Mexico	1–1	2–1	2014 FIFA World Cup qualification	
18	11 October 2013	Estadio Olímpico Metropolitano, San Pedro Sula, Honduras	Costa Rica	1–0	1–0	2014 FIFA World Cup qualification	
19	5 March 2014	Estadio Olímpico Metropolitano, San Pedro Sula, Honduras	Venezuela	1–0	2–1	Friendly	
20	25 March 2015	Stade Municipal Dr. Edmard Lama, Cayenne, French Guiana	French Guiana	1–0	1–3	2015 CONCACAF Gold Cup qualification	
21	8 October 2015	Chelato Uclés National Stadium, Tegucigalpa, Honduras	Guatemala	1–0	1–1	Friendly	
22	13 July 2021	BBVA Stadium, Houston, United States	Grenada	1–0	4–0	2021 CONCACAF Gold Cup	
23	2 July 2023	Bank of America Stadium, Charlotte, United States	Haiti	1–1	2–1	2023 CONCACAF Gold Cup	

== Honours ==
Motagua

- Liga Nacional: 2011 Clausura

Zob Ahan

- Iranian Super Cup: 2016

Saprissa

- Liga FPD: 2018 Clausura

Olimpia

- Liga Nacional: 2021 Clausura, 2019 Apertura, 2020 Apertura, 2021 Clausura, 2021 Apertura, 2022 Apertura, 2023 Clausura, 2023 Apertura, 2024 Clausura
- CONCACAF League: 2022 CONCACAF League

Individual

- Top goalscorers of Liga Nacional de Honduras (8): 2009–10 Clausura, 2010–11 Apertura, 2010–11 Clausura, 2018 Apertura, 2020 Apertura, 2021 Clausura, 2021 Apertura, 2023 Clausura
