= Omar Elvir =

Honduran footballer (born 1989)

Personal information
- Full name: Omar Josué Elvir Casco
- Date of birth: 28 September 1989 (age 37)
- Place of birth: Tegucigalpa, Honduras
- Height: 1.68 m (5 ft 6 in)
- Position: Midfielder

Team information
- Current team: Motagua
- Number: 24

Youth career
- 2010: Motagua B

Senior career*
Years	Team	Apps	(Gls)
2010–	Motagua	305	(12)

International career^{‡}
2020–	Honduras	4	(0)
- * Club domestic league appearances and goals as of 19 May 2021 ‡ National team caps and goals as of 19 January 2022

Omar Josué Elvir Casco (born 28 September 1989) is a Honduran football midfielder, who currently plays for F.C. Motagua in the Honduran National League.

== Club career ==
The leftsided midfielder made his professional debut in September 2010 against Vida.

== International career ==
He made his debut for Honduras national football team on 15 November 2020 in a friendly game against Guatemala. He substituted Franklin Flores in the 62nd minute.

== Career statistics ==
=== Club ===
Club performance			League		Cup		Continental		Total	
Season	Club	League	Apps	Goals	Apps	Goals	Apps	Goals	Apps	Goals
Honduras			Liga Nacional		Honduran Cup		North America		Total	
2010–11	Motagua	Liga Nacional	26	0	—		0	0	26	0
2011–12	Motagua	Liga Nacional	20	0	—		2	0	22	0
2012–13	Motagua	Liga Nacional	27	1	—		—		27	1
2013–14	Motagua	Liga Nacional	1	0	—		—		1	0
Total	Honduras		74	1	0	0	2	0	76	1
Career total			74	1	0	0	2	0	76	1
