= Carlos Ramírez (footballer, born 1987) =

Uruguayan footballer

Personal information
- Full name: Carlos Andrés Ramírez Silva
- Date of birth: 11 October 1987 (age 39)
- Place of birth: Durazno, Uruguay
- Height: 1.90 m (6 ft 3 in)
- Position: Forward

Team information
- Current team: Social Sol
- Number: 29

Senior career*
Years	Team	Apps	(Gls)
2011–2012	Comunicaciones	22	(8)
2012–2013	Santos de Guápiles	14	(2)
2013–2014	Comunicaciones	16	(5)
2016–	Social Sol	1	(1)
- * Club domestic league appearances and goals as of 10 September 2016

Carlos Andrés Ramírez Silva (born 11 October 1987) is a Uruguayan footballer.
