= Balfate =

- Municipality
- Location in Honduras
- Coordinates: 15°43′N 86°17′W
- Country: Honduras
- Department: Colón

Government
  - Mayor: Daniel Gavarrete Suazo (PN)

Area
  - Total: 332 km^{2} (128 sq mi)

Population (2015)
  - Total: 13,217
  - Density: 39.8/km^{2} (103/sq mi)
- Time zone: UTC−06:00 (CST)
- Postal code: 32201
- Administrative code: 0202
- Climate: Af

Balfate is a municipality in the Honduran department of Colón.

Balfate itself is a town of about 2,500, but the municipality includes the towns of Lucinda (600), Lis Lis (1,200) and several others.

In January 2003 a new hospital, Hospital Loma de Luz, was opened in Balfate, bringing much needed medical care to this area.

The main paved highway from La Ceiba (250,000) to Trujillo bypasses Balfate. The road from Jutiapa to Balfate is gravel/dirt and in need of improvement. One of the long range plans of the government is to extend this road completely to Trujillo, which has one of the best natural harbours in the world. It is necessary to cross several rivers without bridges, which is more challenging in the wet season (December/January). At this time the road terminates at Rio Esteban, about 20 km east of Balfate. Completion of the road to Trujillo would be challenging because in this geographical area of the Honduras the mountains extend all the way to the ocean. When completed, travel on this road would save about 40 km when traveling from La Ceiba to Trujillo. It would also open up this coastline to more development.

Balfate was the first port in Honduras from which banana shipments left for the United States. However, the rail lines were dismantled in the mid-1950s and the pier demolished. The possibility exists for the new highway to use the old right of way left by the railroad.
