= Maximiliano Lombardi =

Uruguayan footballer (born 1987)

Personal information
- Full name: Maximiliano Lombardi Rodríguez
- Date of birth: 11 May 1987 (age 39)
- Place of birth: Montevideo, Uruguay
- Height: 1.74 m (5 ft 9 in)
- Position: Midfielder

Team information
- Current team: Miramar Misiones
- Number: 10

Senior career*
Years	Team	Apps	(Gls)
2006–2008	Progreso	42	(6)
2009	Peñarol	6	(1)
2009–2010	Cerro	23	(1)
2010	Boca Unidos	2	(0)
2011	Durazno	7	(4)
2011–2012	Rosario Central	6	(0)
2012–2013	Progreso	13	(1)
2013–2014	El Tanque Sisley	9	(0)
2013–2014	Motagua	34	(9)
2014	Los Caimanes	14	(2)
2015	Rentistas	8	(3)
2015–2016	Los Caimanes	9	(6)
2016	Central Español	11	(2)
2016	Los Caimanes	11	(0)
2017–2018	Cobán Imperial	49	(7)
2018–2020	Comunicaciones	68	(12)
2020–2021	Guastatoya	29	(6)
2021	Cobán Imperial	22	(3)
2022–	Miramar Misiones	81	(18)

International career
2007	Uruguay U20	2	(0)
- * Club domestic league appearances and goals as of 14 September 2024

Maximiliano Lombardi Rodríguez (born 11 May 1987) is an Uruguayan professional footballer who plays for Miramar Misiones.

== International career ==
Lombardi played the 2007 South American Youth Championship in Paraguay.

== Honours ==
Cerro

- 2009 Liguilla Pre-Libertadores de América

Guastatoya

- 2020 Apertura
