= Estadio Rubén Deras =

Football stadium in Honduras

Coordinates: 15.571017°N 87.954388°W

Rubén Deras
- Interactive map of Rubén Deras
- Full name: Estadio Municipal Rubén Deras
- Location: Choloma, Honduras
- Owner: Choloma Municipality
- Capacity: 5 500
- Surface: Grass
- Field size: 105 x 68

Tenant
- Atlético Choloma

The Estadio Rubén Deras is a football stadium located in Choloma, Honduras. It is home of Atlético Choloma and it has a capacity of 5 500 spectators.
