= Choloma =

Choloma Xolomac
- Municipality
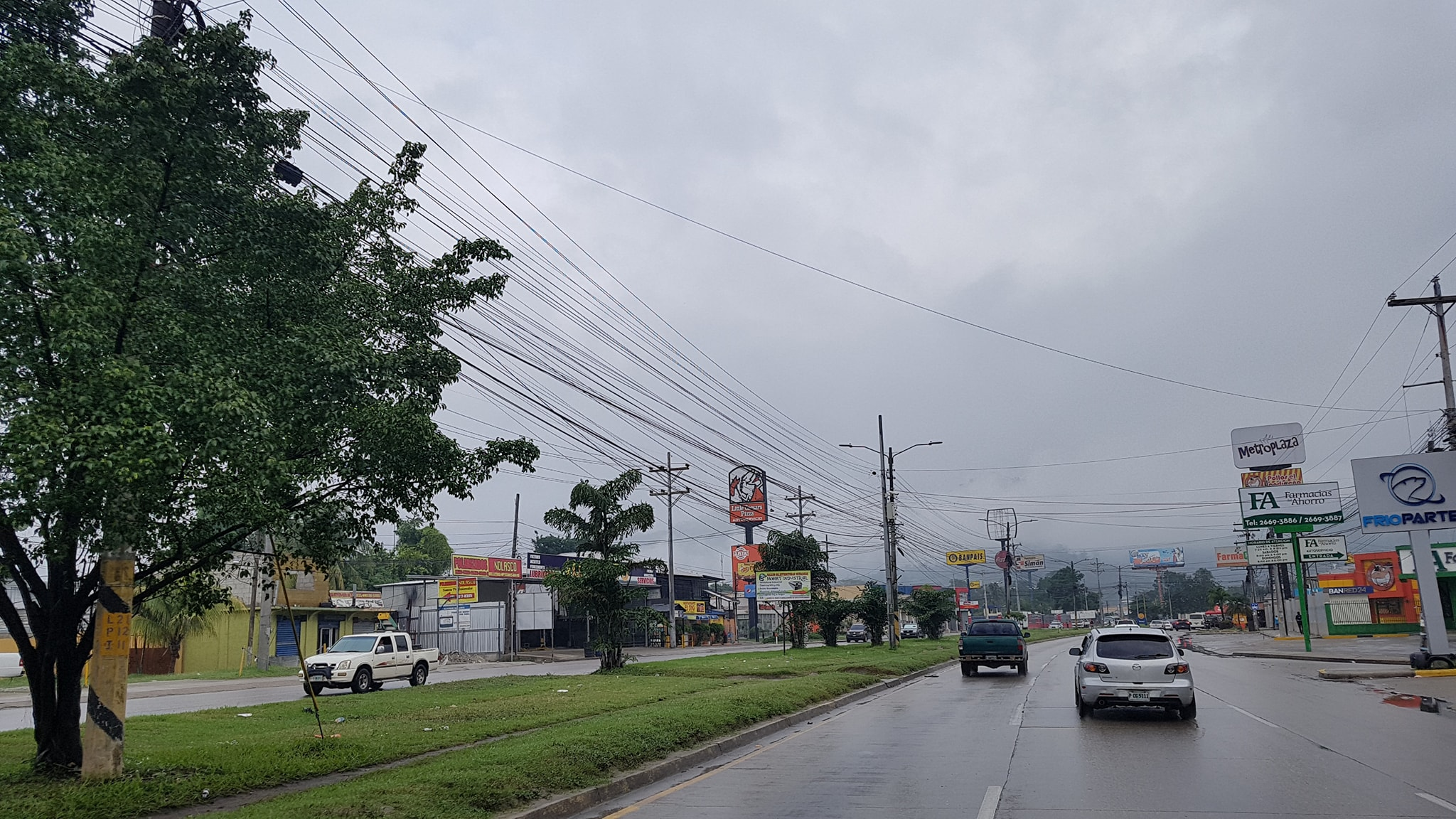
- Bulevar del Norte in the city's border with San Pedro Sula.

- Flag Seal
- Nickname: Choal
- Location within Honduras
- Coordinates: 15°38′0″N 88°0′0″W
- Country: Honduras
- Department: Cortés

Government
  - Mayor: Gustavo Antonio Mejía Escobar (Libre)

Area
  - Municipality: 467 km^{2} (180 sq mi)

Population (2023 projection)
  - Municipality: 296,952
  - Density: 636/km^{2} (1,650/sq mi)
  - Urban: 248,138
- Time zone: UTC−06:00 (CST)
- Postal code: 21112
- Climate: Am

Choloma is a city and municipality in the Honduran department of Cortés. It is the third-largest city in Honduras with a population of 220,300 (2023 calculation). Many factories are stationed in Choloma due to its cheap labour which has boosted the municipality's economy. Choloma is just south of Puerto Cortes and north of San Pedro Sula, with transportation to other municipalities provided by private bus companies. Many transnational companies are stationed here for production as well as in various tax-free zones around the country.

== Mayors ==
- 1894: José María Cobos B.
- 1895: Jesús Urbina
- 1896: Ángel Vaquero
- 1902: José D. Portocarrero
- 1903: Pedro Hernández
- 1916: Alonso G. Urbina
- 1917: Pedro Alemán
- 1918: Justiniano Aguiluz
- 1919: Dionisio Ortega
- 1920: Pablo Reyes
- 1927: Ildefonso Martínez
- 1928: Pablo Reyes
- 1929: Guillermo Mayes
- 1931: Pablo Reyes
- 1932: José Cándido Mejía
- 1933: Pablo Reyes
- 1934: José María Galdamez
- 1935: Máximo Zúniga
- 1936: Carmen Bardales
- 1937: Eduardo Ramos
- 1938: Roque Moreira
- 1943: Raimundo Tejada
- 1944: Juan Martínez
- 1945: Ernesto Tejada
- 1946: Rafael García Caballero
- 1947: Roque Matta
- 1948: Luciano Hernández Henríquez
- 1950: Roque Matta
- 1954: Jacinto Medina R.
- 1955: Jesús Alcocer
- 1959: Selvin Peña
- 1961:Rómulo Castellón Casco
- 1962:Rómulo Castellón Casco
- 1962: Manuel Pagan Lozano
- 1964: Leopoldo Aguilar Cantarero
- 1965: Arnold Alcocer
- 1966: Luciano Hernández Henríquez
- 1969: Juan Pagan Lozano
- 1970: Julieta Ugarte Morales
- 1972: Manuel Pagan Lozano
- 1973: Fausto Deras Velásquez
- 1976: Circuncisión Hernández Cruz
- 1980: Miguel Ángel Alvarado
- 1982: Blanca Aída Reyes Contreras
- 1984: Rómulo Castellón Casco
- 1986: Julio César Yánez Cerna
- 1987: Blanca Alicia Milla Vda. de Yánez
- 1990: Gustavo Adolfo Torres
- 1994: José Armando Gale
- 1998: José Armando Gale
- 2002: Sandra Derás Rivera
- 2006: Leopoldo Crivelli

== Sports ==
Atlético Choloma is the professional football club from Choloma, who have played in the Honduran national football league from 2011 through 2013. They play their home games at the Estadio Rubén Deras.
