= José Treviño (footballer) =

Mexican footballer and manager (born 1960)

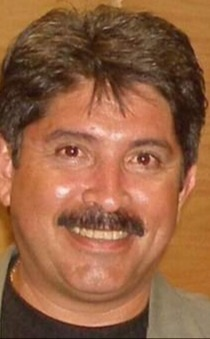
- José Treviño Ruiz

Personal information
- Full name: José Sigifredo Treviño Ruiz
- Date of birth: 29 January 1960 (age 66)
- Place of birth: Mexico

Senior career*
Years	Team	Apps	(Gls)
1978–1984	Monterrey	94	(2)
1987–1988	Correcaminos	27	(3)

Managerial career
- 1998–1999: Monterrey
- 1999–2000: Motagua
- 2002: Monterrey
- 2003: Zacatepec
- 2007: Real España
- 2007–2009: Cachorros UANL
- 2009–2010: Indios
- 2010–2011: Guerreros
- 2011–2012: Motagua
- 2012: Real España
- 2013: Estudiantes del Tecnológico de Nuevo Laredo
- 2014–2015: Monterrey (assistant)
- 2015–2016: Correcaminos UAT
- 2017–2018: San Nicolás
- 2018–2022: Monterrey Reserves and Academy
- 2019: Monterrey (Interim)
- * Club domestic league appearances and goals

José Sigifredo Treviño Ruiz (born 29 January 1960) is a Mexican former professional footballer and manager.

Treviño most recently managed Real C.D. España in the Honduran Liga Nacional.

== Career ==
Treviño played football for C.F. Monterrey and Correcaminos UAT in the Primera División de México.
