= Brayan García =

Honduran footballer (born 1993)

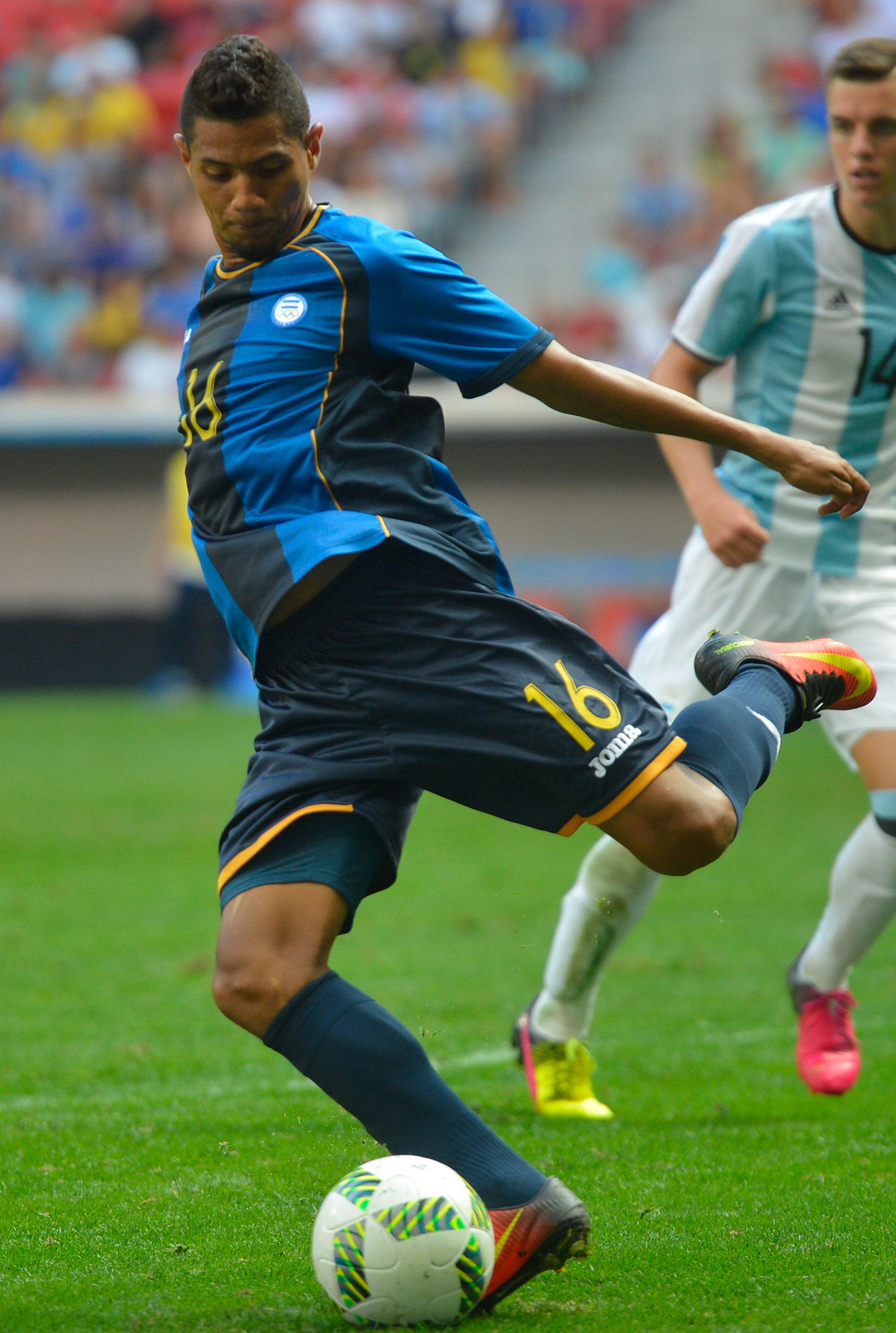
- García with Honduras at the 2016 Summer Olympics

Personal information
- Full name: Brayan Alexander García González
- Date of birth: 26 March 1993 (age 33)
- Place of birth: Catacamas, Honduras
- Height: 1.75 m (5 ft 9 in)
- Position: Defender

Team information
- Current team: Juticalpa

Senior career*
Years	Team	Apps	(Gls)
2013–2014	Motagua	5	(0)
2014–2017	Vida	24	(0)
2018–	Juticalpa	0	(0)

International career^{‡}
2016	Honduras U23		
2015–2017	Honduras	6	(0)
- * Club domestic league appearances and goals as of 4 January 2018 ‡ National team caps and goals as of 15 January 2023

Brayan Alexander García González (born 26 March 1993) is a Honduran footballer. He represented Honduras in youth and senior levels.
