= Nery Medina =

Honduran footballer (born 1981)

Personal information
- Full name: Nery Olvin Medina Norales
- Date of birth: 5 August 1981 (age 45)
- Place of birth: Santa Rosa de Aguán, Honduras
- Height: 1.78 m (5 ft 10 in)
- Position: Rightback

Senior career*
Years	Team	Apps	(Gls)
2002–2005	Motagua		(5)
2005–2006	Municipal Valencia		
2006–2010	Real España		
2010–2012	Necaxa		
2012–2013	Motagua	37	(5)

International career^{‡}
1994	Honduras U-20		(1)
2003–2013	Honduras	15	(1)
- * Club domestic league appearances and goals as of 21 July 2013 ‡ National team caps and goals as of 26 July 2026

Nery Olvin Medina Norales (born 5 August 1981) is a Honduran footballer who most recently played as right back for F.C. Motagua in the Liga Nacional de Fútbol de Honduras.

== Club career ==
Nicknamed el Flash, Medina started his career at F.C. Motagua with whom he won one league title and also played for Municipal Valencia and Real España, whom he left in June 2010.

=== Necaxa ===
On 8 August 2010, Medina made his debut in the Liga Nacional de Fútbol de Honduras for C.D. Necaxa against F.C. Motagua in a 3–0 win. He scored his first goal on 23 January 2011 against Real C.D. España in a 2–1 win. Up to November 2011, he had scored 21 goals in Honduran football.

He rejoined Motagua for the 2012 Apertura season.

== International career ==
Medina made his debut for Honduras in an October 2003 friendly match against Bolivia and has earned a total of 12 caps, scoring no goals. He has represented his country at the 2009 CONCACAF Gold Cup.

His final international was a July 2009 UNCAF Nations Cup match against the USA.

== Career statistics ==
=== International ===
Appearances and goals by national team and year
National team	Year	Apps	Goals
Honduras	2003	1	0
Honduras	2004	5	0
Honduras	2005	–	
Honduras	2006	–	
Honduras	2007	–	
Honduras	2008	–	
Honduras	2009	6	0
Honduras	2010	–	
Honduras	2011	–	
Honduras	2012	–	
Honduras	2013	3	1
Total		15	1

Scores and results list Honduras's goal tally first.

No.	Date	Venue	Opponent	Score	Result	Competition
1	24 July 2013	Cowboys Stadium, Arlington, United States	United States	1–2	1–3	2013 CONCACAF Gold Cup
