= Santa Rosa de Aguán =

- Municipality
- Location in Honduras
- Coordinates: 15°57′N 85°43′W
- Country: Honduras
- Department: Colón

Area
  - Total: 131 km^{2} (51 sq mi)

Population (2015)
  - Total: 5,432
  - Density: 41.5/km^{2} (107/sq mi)

Santa Rosa de Aguán (Spanish pronunciation: [ˈsanta ˈrosa ðe aˈɣwan]) is a municipality in the Honduran department of Colón.

It was affected by Hurricane Mitch.
