= Melvin Valladares =

Honduran footballer (born 1984)

Personal information
- Full name: Melvin Yovany Valladares Castillo
- Date of birth: 14 July 1984 (age 42)
- Place of birth: Tegucigalpa, Honduras
- Height: 1.75 m (5 ft 9 in)
- Positions: Midfielder; forward

Senior career*
Years	Team	Apps	(Gls)
2004–2005	Valencia		(7)
2006–2010	Real España	62	(14)
2010	Guerreros	14	(2)
2011	Dorados	11	(1)
2012–2014	Motagua	45	(7)
2014	Victoria	16	(6)
2015	Marathón	17	(1)
2017	Juticalpa	4	(0)

International career^{‡}
2007–	Honduras	14	(2)
- * Club domestic league appearances and goals as of 25 August 2013 ‡ National team caps and goals as of 19 November 2009

Melvin Yovany Valladares Castillo (born 14 July 1984) is a Honduran footballer who plays as a striker and currently plays for F.C. Motagua in the Honduran Liga Nacional.

== Club career ==
Valladares made his professional debut for Municipal Valencia on 6 August 2004 against Real España before joining Real España himself after the 2005 Apertura. He would score 14 goals for them over a 5 year-period. In November 2009, he went on a trial with Tottenham Hotspur after being recommended by Wilson Palacios.

In 2010, he moved abroad to play for Mexican second division side Guerreros and left them in summer 2011 for Dorados.

He joined Motagua before the 2012 Clausura.

== International career ==
Valladares made his debut for Honduras in a March 2007 friendly match against El Salvador and has, as of March 2013, earned a total of 14 caps, scoring 2 goals. He has represented his country in 2 FIFA World Cup qualification match and played at the 2009 CONCACAF Gold Cup.

His most recent international was an April 2010 friendly match against Venezuela.

== Career statistics ==
=== International ===
Appearances and goals by national team and year
National team	Year	Apps	Goals
Honduras	2007	3	0
Honduras	2008	1	0
Honduras	2009	9	2
Honduras	2010	2	0
Total		15	2

Scores and results list Honduras's goal tally first, score column indicates score after each Valladares goal.

List of international goals scored by Melvin Valladares
No.	Date	Venue	Opponent	Score	Result	Competition
1	11 July 2009	Gillette Stadium, Foxborough, United States	Grenada	3–0	4–0	2009 CONCACAF Gold Cup
2	12 August 2009	Estadio Olímpico Metropolitano, San Pedro Sula, Honduras	Costa Rica	3–0	4–0	2010 FIFA World Cup qualification
