= Emilson Cruz =

Honduran footballer (born 1987)

Personal information
- Full name: Emilson Nictael Cruz Sandrez
- Date of birth: 24 October 1987 (age 39)
- Place of birth: Tegucigalpa, Honduras
- Height: 1.73 m (5 ft 8 in)
- Position: Midfielder

Youth career
- 2008: Motagua B

Senior career*
| Years | Team | Apps | (Gls) |
| 2008–2013 | Motagua | 49 | (0) |
- * Club domestic league appearances and goals as of 12 July 2013

Emilson Nictael Cruz Sandrez (born 24 October 1987) is a Honduran football player, who most recently played for F.C. Motagua in the Honduras National League.

== Club career ==
He was promoted from Águilas del Motagua by Jaime de la Pava to the seniors of Motagua in 2008, alongside future World Cup player Georgie Welcome.
