= Carlos Discua =

Honduran footballer (born 1984)

Personal information
- Full name: Carlos Israel Discua Castellanos
- Date of birth: 20 September 1984 (age 42)
- Place of birth: Tegucigalpa, Honduras
- Height: 1.80 m (5 ft 11 in)
- Position: Midfielder

Team information
- Current team: Marathón
- Number: 7

Senior career*
Years	Team	Apps	(Gls)
2005–2006	Universidad		
2006–2008	Olimpia		
2008–2009	Victoria	27	(13)
2009	Olimpia		
2009–2010	Xinabajul	40	(31)
2010–2011	Comunicaciones		
2011–2015	Motagua	140	(38)
2015–2016	Alajuelense	37	(7)
2016–2018	Motagua	81	(14)
2018–	Marathón	33	(9)

International career^{‡}
2012–2017	Honduras	36	(1)
- * Club domestic league appearances and goals as of 19 May 2018 ‡ National team caps and goals as of 17 March 2017

Carlos Israel Discua Castellanos (born 20 September 1984) is a Honduran football player who currently plays for C.D. Marathón in the Honduran Liga Nacional.

== Club career ==
Nicknamed el Chino, Discua played for Victoria and Olimpia as well as for Guatemalan outfits Deportivo Xinabajul and Comunicaciones before joining F.C. Motagua. He scored his first goal for Motagua on 2 November 2011 in the 3–0 home victory over C.D.S. Vida. In July, 2015, Discua joined Costa Rican first division team, Liga Deportiva Alajuelense. He debuted with La Liga on July 26, 2015, as a starter in the Super Clásico, against Deportivo Saprissa.

== International career ==
Discua made his debut for Honduras in an April 2012 friendly match against Costa Rica and has, as of June 2015, earned a total of 13 caps, scoring one goal. He scored his first goal against the U.S. in the 2015 Gold Cup.

=== International goals ===
Scores and results list Honduras' goal tally first.

Goal	Date	Venue	Opponent	Score	Result	Competition
1.	7 July 2015	Toyota Stadium, Frisco, United States	United States	1–2	1–2	2015 CONCACAF Gold Cup
2.	16 March 2017	Estadio Francisco Morazán, San Pedro Sula, Honduras	Nicaragua	1–0	2–0	Friendly

== Honours and awards ==
=== Club ===
C.D. Olimpia

- Liga Profesional de Honduras: 2007–08 C

Comunicaciones F.C.

- Liga Nacional de Fútbol de Guatemala: 2010–11 C

F.C. Motagua

- Liga Profesional de Honduras: 2014–15 A, 2016–17 A, 2016–17 C
- Honduran Supercup: 2017

C.D. Marathón

- Honduran Supercup: 2019
