= Héctor Francisco Rodríguez =

Honduran football referee (born 1982)

- Full name: Héctor Francisco Rodríguez Hernández
- Born: 13 September 1982 (age 44); Honduras

Domestic
Years	League	Role

International
Years	League	Role
2011–2019	FIFA	Referee

Héctor Francisco Rodríguez Hernández is a Honduran football referee who was a listed international referee for FIFA from 2011 to 2019. He officiates in both the Liga Nacional de Fútbol de Honduras and CONCACAF competitions. He officiated the first leg of the 2015 CONCACAF Champions League Finals between Montreal Impact and América.
