= Júnior Padilla =

Honduran footballer (born 1992)

Personal information
- Full name: Júnior Jesús Padilla Zelaya
- Date of birth: 4 April 1992 (age 34)
- Place of birth: San Pedro Sula, Honduras
- Height: 1.78 m (5 ft 10 in)
- Position: Midfielder

Team information
- Current team: Lobos UPNFM
- Number: 17

Senior career*
Years	Team	Apps	(Gls)
2011–2015	Motagua	63	(4)
2015–2016	Victoria	16	(0)
2017–2020	Lobos UPNFM	67	(7)
2020–2024	Jocoro F.C.	150	(11)
2024–	Lobos UPNFM	17	(3)
- * Club domestic league appearances and goals as of 20 November 2014

Júnior Jesús Padilla Zelaya (born 4 April 1992) is a Honduran footballer who plays as midfielder for Lobos UPNFM in the Honduran Liga Nacional.

== Honours ==
Motagua

- Liga Nacional de Fútbol Profesional de Honduras: 2010–11 C
