= Kerpo de León =

Uruguayan footballer (born 1974)

Personal information
- Full name: Kerpo Gabriel de León
- Date of birth: 25 February 1974 (age 52)
- Place of birth: San Carlos, Uruguay
- Height: 1.74 m (5 ft 8 1/2 in)
- Position: Goalkeeper

Senior career*
Years	Team	Apps	(Gls)
2000–01	Danubio F.C.		
2001–05	Club Atenas		
2005–07	Valencia		
2007–09	Hispano		
2009–10	Platense		
2010–11	Vida		
2011–13	Motagua		
- * Club domestic league appearances and goals as of 11 April 2014

Kerpo Gabriel de León (born 25 February 1974) is a Uruguayan retired footballer who played as goalkeeper mostly in different clubs in the Liga Nacional de Honduras.

== Career ==
He began his career at Danubio Fútbol Club in Uruguayan football in 2000, where he stayed until the following year before joining Club Atlético Atenas (San Carlos, Maldonado), where he played until 2005.
