= Carlos Morán =

Honduran footballer (born 1984)

Personal information
- Full name: Carlos Fernando Morán Guillén
- Date of birth: 19 July 1984 (age 42)
- Place of birth: La Ceiba, Honduras
- Height: 1.65 m (5 ft 5 in)
- Position: Midfielder

Senior career*
Years	Team	Apps	(Gls)
2003–2010	Victoria		
2011–2013	Motagua	43	(5)

International career^{‡}
2005	Honduras	7	(0)
Medal record
Honduras
Second place	UNCAF Nations Cup	2005
- * Club domestic league appearances and goals as of 30 April 2013 ‡ National team caps and goals as of 13 August 2008

Carlos Fernando Morán Guillén (born 19 July 1984) is a Honduran football midfielder, who most recently played for F.C. Motagua in the Honduran national league.

== Club career ==
Morán started his professional career at hometown club Victoria and stayed with them for eight years, before joining F.C. Motagua before the 2011 Clausura.

== International career ==
Morán made his debut for Honduras in a February 2005 UNCAF Nations Cup match against Nicaragua and has earned a total of 7 caps, scoring no goals. He has represented his country at the 2005 UNCAF Nations Cup as well as at the 2005 CONCACAF Gold Cup.

His final international was a July 2005 CONCACAF Gold Cup match against Panama.
