= Estadio Sergio Antonio Reyes =

Coordinates: 14.780751°N 88.782272°W

- Interactive map of Estadio Sergio Antonio Reyes
- Location: Santa Rosa de Copán, Honduras
- Owner: City of Santa Rosa de Copán
- Operator: Deportes Savio
- Capacity: 3,000
- Surface: Grass

Construction
- Opened: 1974

Tenant
- Deportes Savio (Liga Nacional de Honduras)

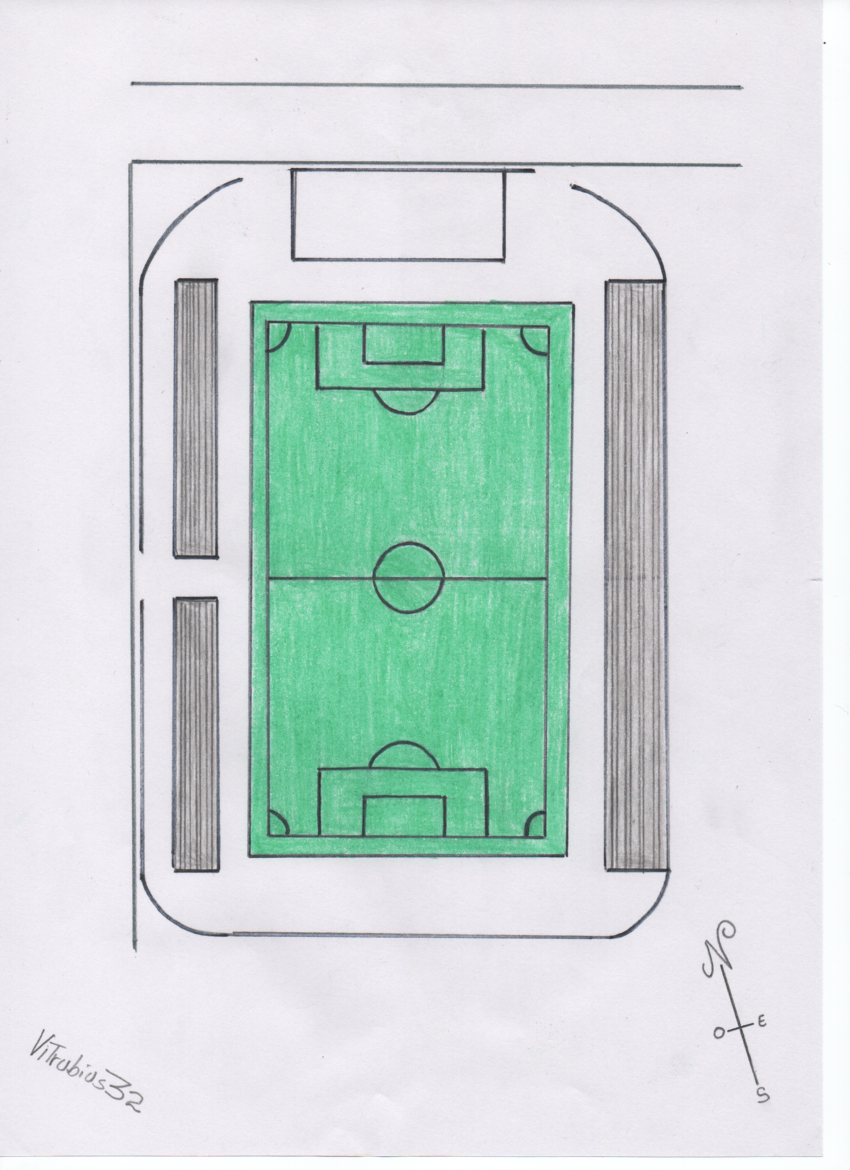

Estadio Sergio Antonio Reyes is a multi-purpose stadium in Santa Rosa de Copán, Honduras. It was previously called "Estadio Municipal Miraflores" and was founded in the Miraflores district of Santa Rosa de Copan, Honduras on 26 January 1975 by the then municipal mayor, representatives of CONAPID, members of the Rotary International Club and other invited guests. It is used mostly for football matches and is the home stadium of Deportes Savio. The stadium holds 3,000 people and is divided into two sectors, Sol (sun) and Sombra (shadow).

== Name change ==
On 14 April 2010, the stadium officially changed its name from Estadio Miraflores to Estadio Sergio Antonio Reyes. That night, Deportes Savio and Motagua tied 0–0 in front of 2,260 spectators.
