= Pedro Atala =

Honduran businessman

- Born: July 19, 1968; Honduras
- Occupation(s): Businessman; Owner of: C.D. Motagua

Pedro Atala is a Honduran business owner of Camosa which is the John Deere distributor in Honduras. He is also president of CD Motagua along with his cousin Javier Atala. His father is Pedro Atala Simón which is an emblem in Motagua. Pedro Atala Simon was the president of the national soccer team, and the national team made his first classification to the World Cup in Spain 1982.
