= David Molina =

Honduran footballer (born 1988)

Personal information
- Full name: David Alejandro Molina Guerra
- Date of birth: 14 March 1988 (age 38)
- Place of birth: Tegucigalpa, Honduras
- Height: 1.78 m (5 ft 10 in)
- Positions: Centre-back; left-back

Youth career
- Motagua

Senior career*
| Years | Team | Apps | (Gls) |
| 2006–2013 | Motagua | 100 | (5) |

International career
| 2004–2005 | Honduras U17 | 7 | (1) |
| 2006–2006 | Honduras U20 | 2 | (0) |
| 2007–2008 | Honduras U23 | 10 | (0) |
| 2008 | Honduras | 2 | (0) |
Medal record
Honduras
| First place | CONCACAF Pre-Olympic Tournament | 2008 |
- * Club domestic league appearances and goals

David Alejandro Molina Guerra (born 14 March 1988) is a Honduran retired footballer who played as a defender. He spent his entire career with F.C. Motagua in the Honduran national league.

== Club career ==
Molina is a Motagua youth product. He played for Motagua's first team from 2006 to 2013 where he appeared in 100 games and scored 5 goals. With Motagua, he won the 2010–11 league title. In the 2011–12 season, featuring in all of Motagua's matches earned him the nickname Iron Man. He retired in 2013, at the age of 26, due to an injury to his right knee.

== International career ==
Playing for the Honduras U17 national team, Molina scored against Belize U17 in the 2005 CONCACAF U17 Tournament.

He was part of the Honduras U23 that won the 2008 CONCACAF Men's Pre-Olympic Tournament and qualified to the 2008 Summer Olympics.

He made his debut for the senior national team on 22 May 2008 in a friendly against Belize.

== Style of play ==
Mostly a centre-back, Molina was also deployed as a left-back.

== Later life ==
After his retirement from playing, Molina emigrated to the United States with his wife. As of May 2020, he was living in Atlanta and had a roofing company. He has two children.

== Honours ==
Motagua

- Honduran Liga Nacional: 2010–11

Honduras U23

- 2008 CONCACAF U–23
