= Alfredo Mejía =

Honduran footballer (born 1990)

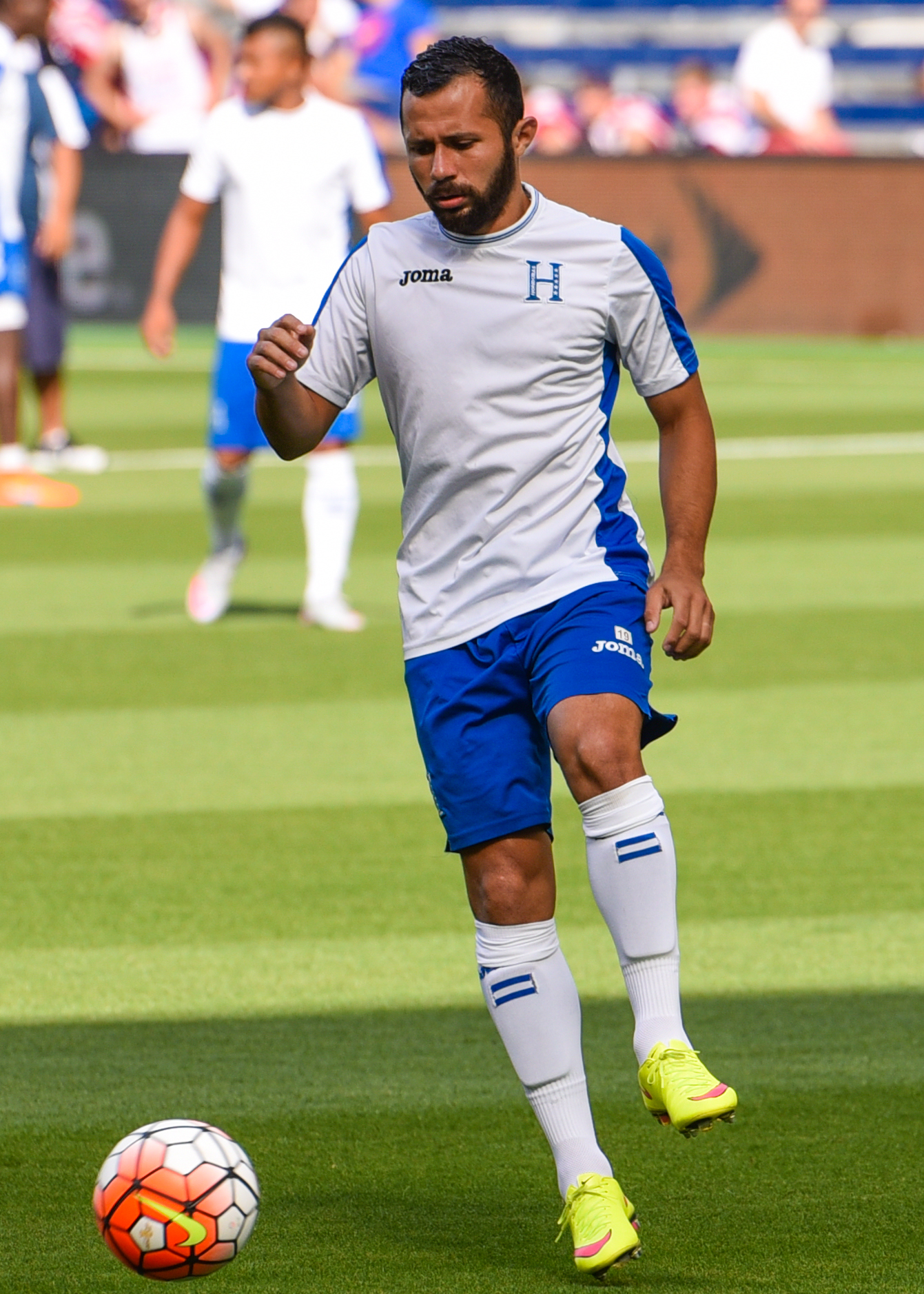
- Mejía with Honduras in 2015

Personal information
- Full name: Alfredo Antonio Mejía Escobar
- Date of birth: 3 April 1990 (age 36)
- Place of birth: El Negrito, Honduras
- Height: 1.73 m (5 ft 8 in)
- Position: Midfielder

Senior career*
Years	Team	Apps	(Gls)
2010–2012	Real España	52	(2)
2012–2013	Motagua	22	(1)
2013–2014	Marathón	20	(1)
2014–2016	Panthrakikos	54	(2)
2016	Marathón	13	(0)
2016–2018	Xanthi	39	(1)
2018–2019	Real España	33	(1)
2019	Pontevedra	12	(1)
2020–2025	Levadiakos	128	(5)
2025	→ Kalamata (loan)	8	(0)

International career^{‡}
2007	Honduras U17	6	(0)
2008–2009	Honduras U20	7	(1)
2011–2013	Honduras U23	6	(0)
2011–2022	Honduras	56	(1)
- * Club domestic league appearances and goals as of 4 May 2025 ‡ National team caps and goals as of 30 March 2022

Alfredo Antonio Mejía Escobar (born 3 April 1990) is a Honduran former professional footballer who played as a midfielder.

== Club career ==
Mejía had a spell at the reserves of Italian side Udinese before spending two years at Real C.D. España. He joined F.C. Motagua for the 2012 Clausura championship.

He had a spell at French side Monaco in 2009 and was rumored to join the Seattle Sounders FC after the Sounders sent scouts over to Honduras.

On 29 January 2016, Xanthi officially announced the signing of the Honduran defensive midfielder, who was recently released from Marathón.

In July 2025, Mejia announced his retirement from football, becoming a sports manager for Kalamata's youth academies in the United States.

== International career ==
Mejía played at the 2007 FIFA U-17 World Cup, 2009 FIFA U-20 World Cup and the 2012 Summer Olympics.

Mejía made his senior debut for Honduras in a January 2011 UNCAF Nations Cup match against Costa Rica and has, as of January 2013, earned a total of 15 caps, scoring 1 goal. He has represented his country at the 2011 UNCAF Nations Cup as well as at the 2011 CONCACAF Gold Cup.

In the 2011 National Team appearance for Honduras, Mejia scored a goal. He appeared on the National Team in 2011, 2012, 2015, 2016, 201, 2018, 2021, and 2022.

=== International goals ===
Alfredo Mejía: International goals
No.	Date	Venue	Opponent	Score	Result	Competition
1	2011-06-10	FIU Stadium, Miami, United States	Grenada	7 – 1	7 – 1	2011 CONCACAF Gold Cup

== Honours ==
Levadiakos

- Super League 2: 2021–22
