= Yankel Rosenthal Stadium =

Stadium in San Pedro Sula, Honduras

Estadio Yankel Rosenthal
- La Cueva del Monstruo "The Monster Cave"
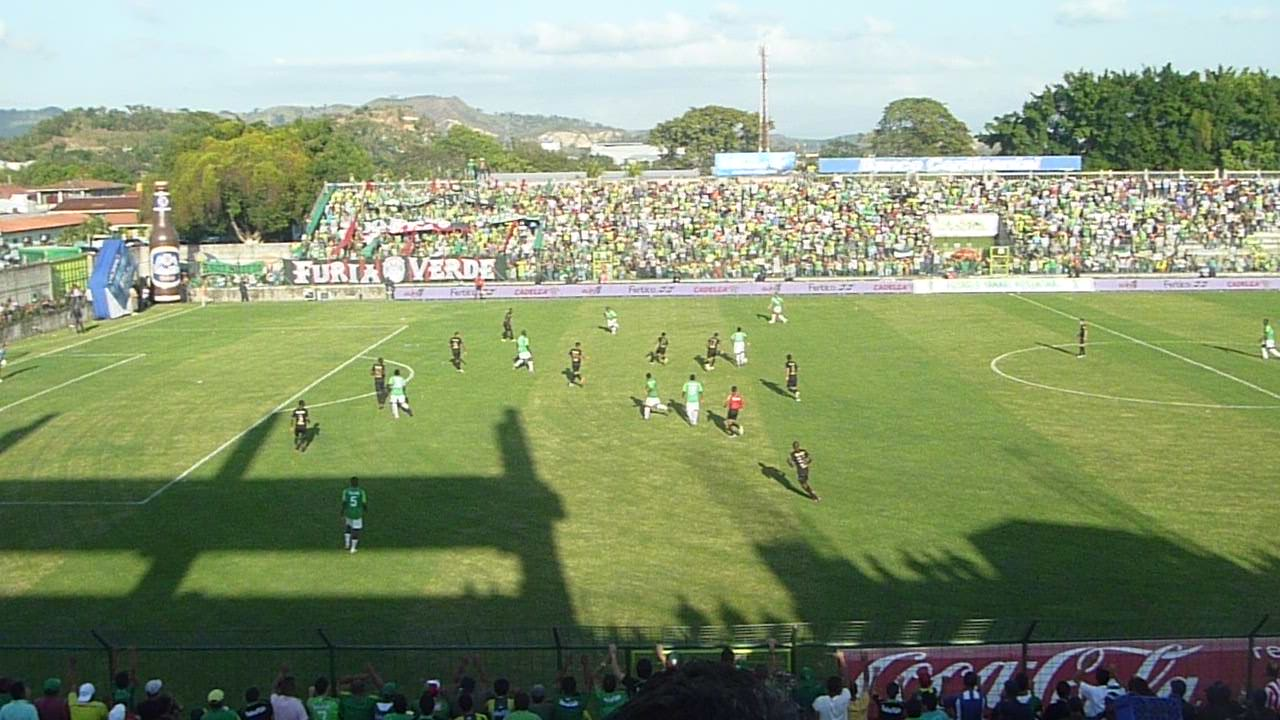
- Interactive map of Estadio Yankel Rosenthal
- Full name: Estadio Yankel Rosenthal
- Location: San Pedro Sula, Honduras
- Coordinates: 15°29′44″N 87°59′57″W
- Owner: Marathón
- Capacity: 5 500
- Surface: GrassMaster

Construction
- Built: 2006
- Opened: 2010

Tenants
- C.D. Marathón (2010–present); Lone F.C. (2019–2022)

The Yankel Rosenthal Stadium (Spanish: Estadio Yankel Rosenthal) is a multi-purpose use stadium in San Pedro Sula, Honduras. Renovations were completed in 2009, and it will now be used primarily for football matches.

It is the home stadium of San Pedro Sula-based Marathón, the second oldest team in the nation, founded November 25, 1925. The stadium has a capacity of 5,500 spectators. The project, which was scheduled to be finalized in its entirety by 2007, was rescheduled to 2009 due to financial issues.

The stadium is named after Marathón's current president and part owner Yankel Rosenthal, who started building the stadium, making Marathón the first Honduran football club to own its own stadium.

== The first game ==
The first game in the Yankel Rosenthal was played on 11 August 2010. Juan Ramón Mejía scored the first goal for Deportes Savio in the 27th minute in the 1–1 draw against Marathón.
