= Roby Norales =

Honduran footballer (born 1991)

Personal information
- Full name: Roby Alberto Norales Núñez
- Date of birth: 25 January 1991 (age 35)
- Place of birth: Balfate, Honduras
- Height: 1.80 m (5 ft 11 in)
- Position: Forward

Team information
- Current team: Mukura Victory

Youth career
- Motagua

Senior career*
Years	Team	Apps	(Gls)
2011–2013	Motagua	46	(8)
2014	Real Sociedad	4	(0)
2014–2015	Deportivo Ayutla	13	(7)
2016	Platense	25	(11)
2017	Bengaluru FC	4	(1)
2017	→ Ozone FC (loan)	1	(0)
2017	Platense	8	(0)
2018	Juventud	0	(0)
2018	Atlético Esperanzano		
2019	Liria Prizren	0	(0)
2020–	Mukura Victory		

International career
2016	Honduras	1	(0)
- * Club domestic league appearances and goals as of 16:44, 21 February 2020 (UTC)

Roby Alberto Norales Núñez (born 25 January 1991), is a Honduran footballer who plays for Honduran club Mukura Victory Sports F.C. as a forward.

== Club career ==
Roby made his National League debut for F.C. Motagua on 28 August 2011 under head coach Ramón Maradiaga against Platense F.C. His first goal came against C.D. Victoriaon 13 November the same year, where he went on to score 2 goals at the Estadio Nacional.

=== Bengaluru ===
On 7 January 2017, Norales signed for Indian I-League champions, Bengaluru FC. However, after 4 games, he was loaned out to I-League 2nd division team Ozone FC. He scored only 1 goal with the club in the league.

=== Platense ===
After unsuccessful stint in India, Norales rejoined Platense in 2017–18 season.

=== Mukura Victory ===
After a failed spell at Kosovo with KF Liria, Norales joined Mukura Victory in Rwanda for the 2020 season.

== International career ==
He was summoned for the first time to the Honduras national team in August 2012 for matches against Cuba in 2014 World Cup Qualifiers.

On 3 November 2016 he made his international debut in a friendly against Belize, coming on as a substitute in the 46th minute of the match.

On 4 November 2016 he received a call by Jorge Luis Pinto for games against Panama and Trinidad and Tobago for the 2018 World Cup Qualifiers.

== Personal life ==
Born in Rio Esteban, a village 20 km from Balfate he came to San Pedro Sula in 2009 to play football and joined the youth team of F.C. Motagua. Honduras national team striker Romell Quioto is his cousin.
