= 2009–10 C.D. Motagua season =

Motagua
2009–10 season
- Chairman: Pedro Atala
- Managers: Juan de Dios Castillo; Ramón Maradiaga
- Apertura: 4th
- Clausura: Runner-up
- Top goalscorer: Welcome (17)
Home colours	Away colours	Third colours

The 2009–10 F.C. Motagua season was the fifty-fifth season of Motagua's professional football lifetime. It consisted of two halves, the Apertura, which ran from July to November 2009, and the Clausura, which ran from January to May 2010.

== Players ==
=== Transfers in ===
Player	Contract date	Moving from
(Argentina) Sergio Diduch	—	(Honduras) Hispano
(Uruguay) Mauricio Weber	—	(Honduras) Victoria
(Honduras) Romel Murillo	—	
(Argentina) Eugenio Klein	—	(Argentina) Alvarado
(Honduras) Mario Gómez	—	(Honduras) Victoria
(Honduras) David Meléndez	—	
(Brazil) Marcelo dos Santos	—	(Honduras) Platense
(Honduras) Amado Guevara	—	(Canada) Toronto FC
(Honduras) Sergio Mendoza	—	(Honduras) Olimpia

=== Transfers out ===
Player	Released date	Moving to
(Honduras) Steven Morris	—	
(Honduras) Miguel Castillo	—	(Honduras) Olimpia
(Brazil) Jocimar Nascimento	—	(Honduras) Olimpia
(Uruguay) Óscar Torlacoff	—	(Honduras) Hispano
(Honduras) José Burgos	—	
(Honduras) Fernando Castillo	—	(Honduras) Marathón
(Honduras) Jefferson Bernárdez	—	(Honduras) Hispano
(Argentina) Guillermo Santo	—	(Venezuela) Yaracuyanos
(Honduras) Kevin Osorio	—	
(Honduras) Víctor Zúniga	—	
(Honduras) Milton Palacios	—	
(Honduras) Marvin Sánchez	—	(Honduras) Hispano
(Honduras) Levon Smith	—	
(Brazil) Nilberto da Silva	—	

=== Squad ===
No.	Pos.	Player name	Date of birth and age
1	GK	(Honduras) Ricardo Canales	30 May 1982 (aged 27)
2	DF	(Honduras) Gustavo Alvarado	10 November 1990 (aged 18)
3	DF	(Uruguay) Guillermo Díaz	31 December 1979 (aged 29)
4	DF	(Honduras) Johnny Leverón	7 February 1990 (aged 19)
5	DF	(Honduras) Milton Reyes	2 May 1974 (aged 35)
6	MF	(Uruguay) Mauricio Weber	28 October 1982 (aged 26)
7	FW	(Honduras) Georgie Welcome	9 March 1985 (aged 24)
8	MF	(Honduras) Jorge Claros	8 January 1986 (aged 23)
9	FW	(Honduras) Shannon Welcome	22 November 1988 (aged 20)
10	FW	(Argentina) Sergio Diduch	23 October 1976 (aged 32)
11	FW	(Brazil) Marcelo dos Santos	17 March 1979 (aged 30)
12	DF	(Honduras) Iván Guerrero	30 November 1977 (aged 31)
13	MF	(Honduras) Ronald Martínez	26 July 1990 (aged 18)
14	MF	(Honduras) Luís Guzmán	19 December 1979 (aged 29)
15	DF	(Honduras) David Meléndez	—
15	DF	(Honduras) Gabriel Balladares	14 December 1991 (aged 17)
17	DF	(Honduras) Rommel Murillo	5 November 1983 (aged 25)
17	DF	(Honduras) Ramón Amador	23 January 1994 (aged 15)
18	FW	(Honduras) Meller Sánchez	26 June 1988 (aged 21)
19	MF	(Honduras) Emilson Cruz	24 October 1987 (aged 21)
20	MF	(Honduras) Amado Guevara	2 May 1976 (aged 33)
21	DF	(Honduras) Emilio Izaguirre	10 May 1986 (aged 23)
22	GK	(Honduras) Donaldo Morales	13 October 1982 (aged 26)
23	MF	(Honduras) Daniel Lloyd	17 October 1988 (aged 20)
23	DF	(Honduras) Sergio Mendoza	23 May 1981 (aged 28)
25	GK	(Honduras) Marlon Licona	9 February 1991 (aged 18)
26	DF	(Honduras) David Molina	14 March 1988 (aged 21)
27	DF	(Honduras) Mario Gómez	12 August 1981 (aged 27)
28	DF	(Honduras) Samir García	10 January 1980 (aged 29)
29	MF	(Argentina) Eugenio Klein	17 January 1982 (aged 27)
29	MF	(Honduras) Alejandro Aguiluz	11 October 1992 (aged 16)
30	MF	(Honduras) Rubén Rivera	18 May 1987 (aged 22)
31	MF	(Honduras) Carlos Cruz	2 November 1990 (aged 18)
32	MF	(Honduras) Leonardo Isaula	8 February 1977 (aged 32)
33	DF	(Honduras) Esdras Padilla	4 September 1989 (aged 19)
35	FW	(Honduras) José Valladares	16 July 1989 (aged 19)
36	MF	(Honduras) Javier Portillo	10 June 1981 (aged 28)
37	GK	(Honduras) Eduardo Sánchez	—
43	FW	(Honduras) Jairo Martínez	14 May 1978 (aged 31)
–	FW	(Honduras) José Rivera	—
–	DF	(Honduras) Eleazar Padilla	—
–	DF	(Honduras) Carlos Pineda	—

== Results ==
=== Preseason and friendlies ===
19 June 2009 Friendly	Honduras U-17	0–4	Motagua	La Esperanza
			Diduch; Rivera; Molina; Valladares

11 July 2009 Friendly	Honduras U-17	0–2	Motagua	Siguatepeque
			Klein

11 July 2009 Friendly	Honduras U-20	1–2	Motagua	Siguatepeque
	Rojas 8'		Welcome 9'; Diduch

30 December 2009 Friendly	Alianza (El Salvador)	1–2	(Honduras) Motagua	San Salvador, El Salvador
CST	Zelaya 44'		61' (pen.) Diduch; 70' dos Santos	Stadium: Estadio Cuscatlán; Attendance: 700

9 January 2010 Friendly	Juventud Otoreño B	0–8	Motagua	Jesús de Otoro, Intibucá
CST			Rivera; Suazo; Gómez; Sánchez; Alvarado; Padilla

9 January 2010 Friendly	Juventud Otoreño	2–7	Motagua	Jesús de Otoro, Intibucá
CST	Smith; Palacios		dos Santos; Leverón; Welcome; Diduch; Weber

15 January 2010 Friendly	Jocón	0–3	Motagua	Jocón, Yoro
CST			Valladares dos Santos; Reyes

17 January 2010 Friendly	Social Sol	1–2	Motagua	Olanchito, Yoro
CST	Romero 19'		51' Welcome; 56' Martínez	Stadium: Estadio San Jorge

23 January 2010 Friendly	D.C. United (United States)	4–2	(Honduras) Motagua	Miami, United States
EST	Gros 6'; Gómez 34'; Emílio 65'; DeRoux 74'		23' V. Bernárdez; 90' J. Bernárdez	Stadium: Tropical Park

=== Apertura ===
During the preseason, several members of the team suffered from food poisoning, complaining of stomach pain and four of them were admitted to a clinic. Iván Guerrero, Johnny Leverón, Romel Murillo and Carlos Padilla, were the players that were taken to the hospital due to severe dehydration. The rest of the team took a medical evaluation at the headquarters of the club. Following this incident, the coach Juan de Dios Castillo suspended training for a couple of days.

19 July 2009 Round 1	Motagua	2–0	Real Juventud	Tegucigalpa
	Isaula 35'; Welcome 53'			Attendance: 2,946; Referee: Rolando Hernández

22 July 2009 Round 2	Motagua	3–1	Deportes Savio	Tegucigalpa
	Isaula 8' 20' dos Santos 89'		López 59'	Attendance: 1,600; Referee: Marvin Matamoros

26 July 2009 Round 3	Olimpia	0–0	Motagua	Tegucigalpa
				Attendance: 11,053; Referee: Gaspar Molina

2 August 2009 Round 4	Motagua	1–2	Vida	Tegucigalpa
	dos Santos 28'		Bengtson 54'; Córdoba 76'	Attendance: 1,856; Referee: José Sandoval

8 August 2009 Round 5	Marathón	2–0	Motagua	San Pedro Sula
	Paz 27'; Brown 75'			Attendance: 1,374; Referee: José Molina

16 August 2009 Round 6	Platense	2–2	Motagua	Puerto Cortés
	Savonek 17'; Róchez 41'		Leverón 43'; Welcome 75'	Attendance: 1,977; Referee: José Cálix

23 August 2009 Round 7	Motagua	1–0	Real España	Tegucigalpa
	Isaula 78' (pen.)			Attendance: 2,659; Referee: José Molina

29 August 2009 Round 8	Victoria	0–4	Motagua	La Ceiba
			Weber 12'; Guzmán 26'; Welcome 42'; Diduch 49'	Attendance: 2,985; Referee: Evaristo Soriano

2 September 2009 Round 9	Hispano	2–2	Motagua	Comayagua
	Jiménez 27' (pen.); Morales 54'		Weber 29'; Diduch 50' (pen.)	Referee: Ronald Hernández

13 September 2009 Round 10	Real Juventud	0–3	Motagua	Santa Bárbara
			Welcome 41'; Diduch 56'; Welcome 81'	Attendance: 581; Referee: Óscar Moncada

20 September 2009 Round 11	Deportes Savio	0–2	Motagua	Santa Rosa de Copán
			Welcome 71'; Welcome 82'	Attendance: 1,194; Referee: José Sandoval

4 October 2009 Round 12	Motagua	0–1	Olimpia	Tegucigalpa
			de Souza 85'	Attendance: 8,803; Referee: Óscar Moncada

7 October 2009 Round 13	Vida	1–1	Motagua	La Ceiba
	Bengtson 68'		Welcome 11'	Attendance: 1,687; Referee: José Sandoval

18 October 2009 Round 14	Motagua	2–2	Marathón	Tegucigalpa
	Welcome 75' 78'		Mejía 6'; Martínez 26'	Attendance: 2,257; Referee: Ricardo Zelaya

25 October 2009 Round 15	Motagua	2–0	Platense	Tegucigalpa
	Welcome 23'; Izaguirre 34'			Attendance: 2,105; Referee: José Cálix

28 October 2009 Round 16	Real España	1–2	Motagua	San Pedro Sula
	Delgado 53'		Diduch 27'; Welcome 38'	Attendance: 2,508; Referee: José Sandoval

1 November 2009 Round 17	Motagua	3–0	Victoria	Tegucigalpa
	Welcome 5' 47'; Leverón 69'			Attendance: 2,792; Referee: Óscar Moncada

4 November 2009 Round 18	Motagua	1–0	Hispano	Tegucigalpa
	Díaz 6'			Attendance: 1,341; Referee: Héctor Rodríguez

7 November 2009 Semifinals	Olimpia	0–1	Motagua	Tegucigalpa
			Diduch 41' (pen.)	Attendance: 6,408; Referee: Óscar Moncada

10 November 2009 Semifinals	Motagua	0–2	Olimpia	Tegucigalpa
19:30			Rojas 14'; Turcios 85'	Attendance: Not reported Referee: Benigno Pineda

- Motagua 1–2 Olimpia on aggregate.

=== Clausura ===
The 2009–10 Clausura season for C.D. Motagua was somewhat bittersweet, they manage to finish on first position in the Regular season, an honor not accomplished since December 2001; they overcame in Semifinals beating C.D. Platense with difficulties; however lost in the Final against Club Deportivo Olimpia in spite of having shown great football.

30 January 2010 Round 1	Victoria	1–0	Motagua	La Ceiba
19:30	Copete 89'			Attendance: 3,589; Referee: Armando Castro Starting XI: 22 – Morales; 3 – Díaz; 4 – Leverón; 6 – Weber (substituted off); 7 – G. Welcome; 8 – Claros; 10 – Diduch (substituted off); 12 – Guerrero; 20 – Guevara; 21 – Izaguirre; 28 – García; Substitutes; 9 – S. Welcome (substituted on); 11 – dos Santos (substituted on)

3 February 2010 Round 2	Motagua	3–1	Real Juventud	Tegucigalpa
19:30	dos Santos 38' 90'; Welcome 78'		Grant 52'	Attendance: 2,389; Referee: Wilson Matute

6 February 2010 Round 3	Marathón	3–4	Motagua	San Pedro Sula
19:30	Ramírez 57' (pen.); Palacios 75'; Mejía 82'		Welcome 12'; Norales 38' (o.g.) dos Santos 41'; Aguiluz 88'	Attendance: 3,034; Referee: José Pineda Starting XI: 22 – Morales; 3 – Díaz; 4 – Leverón; 6 – Weber; 7 – Welcome; 8 – Claros; 11 – dos Santos; 12 – Guerrero; 20 – Guevara; 21 – Izaguirre; 23 – Mendoza

14 February 2010 Round 4	Hispano	3–1	Motagua	Comayagua
	Flores 25' 60' (pen.) 86'		Guevara 79'	Attendance: 4,829; Referee: Armando Castro

17 February 2010 Round 5	Motagua	1–0	Real España	Tegucigalpa
19:30	Leverón 37'			Attendance: 2,676; Referee: Benigno Pineda

21 February 2010 Round 6	Vida	0–1	Motagua	La Ceiba
15:00			Diduch 45+3' (pen.)	Attendance: 4,572; Referee: Mario Moncada

28 February 2010 Round 7	Motagua	1–0	Olimpia	Tegucigalpa
16:00	dos Santos 60'			Attendance: 16,673; Referee: Benigno Pineda

7 March 2010 Round 8	Platense	2–1	Motagua	Puerto Cortés
15:00	Róchez 33'; Kurley 81'		Díaz 90'	Attendance: 3,668; Referee: Ricardo Zelaya

11 March 2010 Round 9	Motagua	1–1	Deportes Savio	Tegucigalpa
19:30	Welcome 45+1'		Smith 10'	Attendance: 1,551; Referee: Wilson Matute

14 March 2010 Round 10	Motagua	3–0	Victoria	Tegucigalpa
16:00	Welcome 12'; Diduch 14' 56'			Attendance: 2,034; Referee: Miguel Torres

17 March 2010 Round 11	Real Juventud	0–3	Motagua	Santa Bárbara
			Welcome 17' 30'; Weber 62'	Attendance: 1,028; Referee: Geovanny Mendoza

21 March 2010 Round 12	Motagua	1–0	Marathón	Tegucigalpa
16:00	Welcome 32'			Attendance: 4,019; Referee: José Molina

28 March 2010 Round 13	Motagua	1–0	Hispano	Tegucigalpa
16:00	Diduch 13'			Attendance: 2,548; Referee: Erick Andino

31 March 2010 Round 14	Real España	2–1	Motagua	San Pedro Sula
19:30	Pavón 39' (pen.) 73'		Delgado 22' (o.g.)	Attendance: 6,571; Referee: Ricardo Zelaya

7 April 2010 Round 15	Motagua	3–2	Vida	Tegucigalpa
19:30	Welcome 25'; Guevara 38'; Guerrero 64'		Bangtson 50' 71' (pen.)	Attendance: 2,042; Referee: Geovanny Mendoza

11 April 2010 Round 16	Olimpia	0–0	Motagua	Tegucigalpa
16:00				Attendance: 11,824; Referee: Armando Castro

14 April 2010 Round 17	Motagua	3–0	Platense	Tegucigalpa
19:30	Mendoza 14' dos Santos 81'; Martínez 90'			Attendance: 1,098; Referee: Benigno Pineda

17 April 2010 Round 18	Deportes Savio	0–0	Motagua	Santa Rosa de Copán
				Attendance: 2,260; Referee: Héctor Rodríguez

25 April 2010 Semifinals	Platense	2–2	Motagua	Puerto Cortés
15:00	Roóches 49' 63'		dos Santos 14'; Guevara 16'	Attendance: 3,560; Referee: Óscar Moncada

28 April 2010 Semifinals	Motagua	0–0	Platense	Tegucigalpa
19:30				Attendance: 6,159; Referee: Marlon Muñoz

- Motagua 2–2 Platense on aggregate; Motagua advanced on better Regular season performance.

2 May 2010 Final	Olimpia	3–1	Motagua	Tegucigalpa
16:00	Tilguath 23'; Rojas 40' 58'		dos Santos 73'	Attendance: 14,178; Referee: Armando Castro

8 May 2010 Final	Motagua	1–0	Olimpia	Tegucigalpa
19:30	Welcome 38'			Attendance: 16,299; Referee: Benigno Pineda

- Motagua 2–3 Olimpia on aggregate.
