= 2010–11 C.D. Motagua season =

Motagua
2010–11 season
- Chairman: Pedro Atala
- Manager: Ramón Maradiaga
- Apertura: 7th
- Clausura: Winners
- CONCACAF Champions League: Preliminary round
- Top goalscorer: League: Jerry Bengtson (15); All: Jerry Bengtson (15)
- Highest home attendance: 12,462
- Lowest home attendance: 97
- Average home league attendance: 3,677
Home colours	Away colours
- All statistics correct as of 15 May 2011.

The 2010–11 C.D. Motagua season in the Honduran football league was divided into two tournaments, Apertura and Clausura. The preseason started on late June and the Regular season on 7 August 2010.

== Overview ==
Before the start of the season, the Honduras national football team competed in the 2010 FIFA World Cup, a total of five Motagua players were call to contribute with the national team, these being Canales, Guevara, Izaguirre, Mendoza and Welcome. Nevertheless, Canales was set free from the team just after returning from the tournament. On 19 October 2010, coach Ramón Maradiaga separated 8 players from the main squad due to poor performance and sent them to the reserve team. These players were the foreign Guillermo Díaz, Mauricio Weber, Charles Córdoba, and Marcelo dos Santos, leaving the team only with domestic players. Ronald Martínez, Meller Sánchez, Rubén Rivera, and Javier Portillo were also dismissed. On 4 November 2010, Motagua lost 0–2 at home against C.D.S. Vida, ending any possibilities of advancing to the final round. This game also set a record of the lowest home attendance of all times for Motagua, with only 97 spectators.

The Clausura tournament for F.C. Motagua started on 16 January 2011 with a 1–1 draw at home against C.D. Necaxa; in this game Roger Mondragón suffered a serious injury on his ankle at the 45th minute of play; it was estimated that Mondragón could be sidelined from 6 months to a year On 7 January 2011 the International Federation of Football History & Statistics published a list of the World's Best Coach of the 1st Decade (2001–2010) and Motagua's current coach at the time, Ramón Maradiaga, appeared on the list ranked 167th. At the end of the regular season, Motagua finished 2nd, earning the right to play on the Semifinals against C.D.S. Vida who finished 3rd. This was the first time in history that Motagua faced Vida in a semifinal series. On 29 April 2011, the club made official its first signing for the next season; it was announced that the 24-year-old striker Luis Alfredo López signed a one-year contract. In the semifinals, despite a 3–3 draw on aggregate against C.D.S. Vida they had the benefit of the rules and relied on its better Regular season performance. On 30 April 2011, F.C. Motagua earned a ticket to the final after defeating Vida 3–2 in Tegucigalpa, three days before they had lost 0–1 in La Ceiba. Once in the final, the wait was over and after more than four years without domestic titles, Motagua managed to beat city rivals C.D. Olimpia 5–3 on aggregate score, thanks to a magnificent performance from Jerry Bengtson who scored three goals in the series. Also, with this achievement, Motagua qualified to the 2011–12 CONCACAF Champions League.

== Players ==
=== Transfers in ===
Player	Contract date	Moving from
(Colombia) Charles Córdoba	12 May 2010	(Honduras) Vida
(Honduras) Jerry Bengtson	26 November 2010	(Honduras) Vida
(Honduras) Júnior Izaguirre	30 November 2010	(Honduras) Victoria
(Honduras) Carlos Morán	6 December 2010	(Honduras) Victoria
(Honduras) David Álvarez	7 January 2011	(Honduras) Hispano
(Honduras) Adán Ramírez	7 January 2011	(Honduras) Platense
(Colombia) Andrés Copete	21 January 2011	(Honduras) Olimpia
(Guatemala) Guillermo Ramírez	25 January 2011	(Guatemala) Municipal
(Honduras) Odis Borjas	–	(Honduras) Platense
(Honduras) Erick Zepeda	–	(Honduras) Marathón

=== Transfers out ===
Player	Released date	Moving to
(Argentina) Sergio Diduch	5 June 2010	(Honduras) Hispano
(Honduras) Mario Gómez	5 June 2010	Retired
(Honduras) Javier Portillo	1 July 2010	(Honduras) Vida
(Honduras) Ricardo Canales	2 July 2010	(Honduras) Victoria
(Honduras) Emilio Izaguirre	18 August 2010	(Scotland) Celtic
(Uruguay) Mauricio Weber	19 October 2010	Retired
(Honduras) Shannon Welcome	28 December 2010	(Honduras) Hispano
(Brazil) Marcelo dos Santos	29 December 2010	(Brazil) Santo André
(Uruguay) Guillermo Díaz	1 January 2011	(Peru) Melgar
(Colombia) Charles Córdoba	1 January 2011	(Honduras) Necaxa
(Honduras) Luís Guzmán	1 January 2011	(Honduras) Necaxa
(Honduras) Meller Sánchez	1 January 2011	Free agent
(Honduras) Óscar García	1 January 2011	(Honduras) Necaxa
(Honduras) José Valladares	10 January 2011	(Honduras) Necaxa
(Honduras) Georgie Welcome	28 January 2011	Monaco

=== Squad ===
- Statistics as of 15 May 2011
- Only league matches into account

No.	Pos.	Player name	Date of birth and age	Games played			Goals scored		
				< 09/10	10/11	Total	< 09/10	10/11	Total
1	GK	(Honduras) Walter Flores	22 January 1987 (aged 23)	0	0	0	0	0	0
1	GK	(Honduras) Harold Fonseca	8 April 1994 (aged 16)	0	0	0	0	0	0
2	MF	(Honduras) Gustavo Alvarado	10 November 1990 (aged 19)	3	10	13	0	1	1
3	DF	(Uruguay) Guillermo Díaz	31 December 1979 (aged 30)	72	6	78	3	0	3
4 / 18	MF	(Honduras) Roger Mondragón	20 September 1989 (aged 20)	0	14	14	0	1	1
4	DF	(Honduras) Júnior Izaguirre	12 August 1979 (aged 30)	218	18	236	31	0	31
5	DF	(Honduras) Milton Reyes	2 May 1974 (aged 36)	261	23	284	4	0	4
6	MF	(Uruguay) Mauricio Weber	26 October 1982 (aged 27)	34	4	38	3	0	3
6	MF	(Honduras) David Álvarez	5 December 1985 (aged 24)	0	2	2	0	0	0
7	FW	(Honduras) Georgie Welcome	9 March 1985 (aged 25)	64	12	76	23	5	28
7	MF	(Guatemala) Guillermo Ramírez	26 March 1978 (aged 32)	0	16	16	0	3	3
8	MF	(Honduras) Jorge Claros	8 January 1986 (aged 24)	–	28	–	1	3	4
9	FW	(Honduras) Shannon Welcome	22 November 1988 (aged 21)	38	11	49	8	2	10
9	FW	(Colombia) Andrés Copete	29 October 1983 (aged 26)	0	12	12	0	1	1
10	FW	(Colombia) Charles Córdoba	15 September 1982 (aged 27)	0	7	7	0	1	1
10	MF	(Honduras) Carlos Morán	19 July 1984 (aged 25)	0	9	9	0	1	1
11	FW	(Brazil) Marcelo dos Santos	17 March 1979 (aged 31)	28	9	37	9	1	10
12	MF	(Honduras) Iván Guerrero	30 November 1977 (aged 32)	–	37	–	5	0	5
13	MF	(Honduras) Ronald Martínez	26 July 1990 (aged 19)	16	2	18	1	0	1
14	DF	(Honduras) Luís Guzmán	19 December 1980 (aged 29)	–	10	–	3	2	5
15	MF	(Honduras) Gabriel Balladares	14 December 1991 (aged 18)	2	1	3	0	0	0
16	DF	(Honduras) Johnny Leverón	7 February 1990 (aged 20)	24	28	52	3	2	5
17	MF	(Honduras) Ramón Amador	23 January 1994 (aged 16)	2	0	2	0	0	0
18	MF	(Honduras) Meller Sánchez	28 July 1988 (aged 21)	11	2	13	0	0	0
19	MF	(Honduras) Emilson Cruz	24 October 1987 (aged 22)	9	10	19	0	0	0
20	MF	(Honduras) Amado Guevara	2 May 1976 (aged 34)	–	30	–	53	7	60
21	DF	(Honduras) Emilio Izaguirre	10 May 1986 (aged 24)	143	0	143	4	0	4
21	MF	(Honduras) Odis Borjas	3 October 1987 (aged 22)	0	21	21	0	0	0
22	GK	(Honduras) Donaldo Morales	13 October 1982 (aged 27)	43	32	75	0	0	0
23	DF	(Honduras) Sergio Mendoza	23 May 1981 (aged 29)	18	33	51	1	2	3
25	GK	(Honduras) Marlon Licona	9 February 1991 (aged 19)	1	8	9	0	0	0
26	DF	(Honduras) David Molina	14 March 1988 (aged 22)	35	14	49	3	0	3
27 / 11	MF	(Honduras) Aly Arriola	22 September 1987 (aged 22)	0	13	13	0	1	1
27	FW	(Honduras) Jerry Bengtson	8 April 1987 (aged 23)	0	22	22	0	15	15
28	DF	(Honduras) Óscar García	10 January 1980 (aged 30)	–	9	–	1	0	1
28	MF	(Honduras) Adán Ramírez	28 August 1986 (aged 23)	0	20	20	0	2	2
29	MF	(Honduras) Alejandro Aguiluz	11 October 1992 (aged 17)	6	0	6	1	0	1
30	MF	(Honduras) Rubén Rivera	18 May 1987 (aged 23)	–	6	–	2	0	2
31	FW	(Honduras) Carlos Cruz	2 November 1990 (aged 19)	6	3	9	1	0	1
32	MF	(Honduras) Jorge Escobar	19 March 1991 (aged 19)	0	5	5	0	0	0
33	MF	(Honduras) Esdras Padilla	4 September 1989 (aged 20)	22	13	35	0	0	0
34 / 13	MF	(Honduras) Mario Girón	28 March 1990 (aged 20)	0	11	11	0	1	1
35	FW	(Honduras) José Valladares	16 July 1989 (aged 20)	4	1	5	2	0	2
36	MF	(Honduras) Javier Portillo	10 June 1981 (aged 29)	40	8	48	0	0	0
37	GK	(Honduras) Eduardo Sánchez	23 July 1987 (aged 22)	0	0	0	0	0	0
38 / 24	MF	(Honduras) Omar Elvir	28 September 1989 (aged 20)	0	26	26	0	0	0
42 / 41	MF	(Honduras) Christopher Bush	–	0	1	1	0	0	0
56	FW	(Honduras) Javier Norales	–	0	1	1	0	0	0
Manager		(Honduras) Ramón Maradiaga	30 October 1954 (aged 55)	26 November 2009 –					

== Results ==
All times are local CST unless stated otherwise.

=== Preseason and friendlies ===
1 August 2010 Friendly	Hispano	2–1	Motagua	Comayagua
16:00	Flores 60'; Angulo 86'	Report	27' dos Santos	Stadium: Estadio Carlos Miranda

19 December 2010 Friendly	Hispano	0–1	Motagua	Comayagua
		Report	50' Arriola	Stadium: Estadio Carlos Miranda

8 January 2011 Friendly	Águila (El Salvador)	1–1	(Honduras) Motagua	San Miguel, El Salvador
	Álvarez 23'	Report	26' Arriola	Stadium: Estadio Juan Francisco Barraza

12 January 2011 Friendly	Comunicaciones (Guatemala)	2–0	(Honduras) Motagua	Guatemala City, Guatemala
19:00	Márquez 65' (pen.); Discua 89'	Report		Stadium: Estadio Cementos Progreso

=== Apertura ===
8 August 2010 Week 1	Necaxa	3–0	Motagua	Danlí
14:30	Licona 25' 39'; Navas 44'	Report		Stadium: Estadio Marcelo Tinoco; Attendance: 2,880; Referee: Óscar Moncada

15 August 2010 Week 2	Motagua	2–2	Hispano	Tegucigalpa
16:00	Hill 65' (o.g.) dos Santos 90+4'	Report	34' Genovese; 42' Cacho	Stadium: Estadio Nacional; Attendance: 1,110; Referee: Óscar Hernández

22 August 2010 Week 3	Marathón	1–0	Motagua	San Pedro Sula
15:30	Diamond 90+3'	Report		Stadium: Estadio Yankel Rosenthal; Attendance: 3,808; Referee: José Molina

29 August 2010 Week 4	Motagua	1–0	Platense	Tegucigalpa
16:00	Córdoba 45+3'	Report		Stadium: Estadio Nacional; Attendance: 1,094; Referee: Mario Moncada

5 September 2010 Week 5	Olimpia	1–1	Motagua	Tegucigalpa
15:00	Bruschi 67'	Report	76' Welcome	Stadium: Estadio Nacional; Attendance: 6,193; Referee: José Pineda

11 September 2010 Week 6	Vida	2–2	Motagua	La Ceiba
19:30	Ruiz 12'; Lozano 86'	Report	66' Welcome; 88' Mondragón	Stadium: Estadio Nilmo Edwards; Attendance: 3,337; Referee: Geovanny Mendoza

19 September 2010 Week 7	Motagua	1–1	Real España	Tegucigalpa
16:00	Welcome 52'	Report	67' Martínez	Stadium: Estadio Nacional; Attendance: 1,461; Referee: Armando Castro

29 September 2010 Week 8	Victoria	2–1	Motagua	La Ceiba
20:00	Martínez 1'; Mena 44'	Report	38' Welcome	Stadium: Estadio Nilmo Edwards; Attendance: 1,225; Referee: José Molina

3 October 2010 Week 9	Deportes Savio	2–2	Motagua	Santa Rosa de Copán
14:00	Solórzano 10'; Costa 65'	Report	43' 86' Claros	Stadium: Estadio Sergio Antonio Reyes; Attendance: 1,264; Referee: Geovanny Mendoza

10 October 2010 Week 10	Motagua	1–0	Necaxa	Tegucigalpa
16:00	Guevara 11'	Report		Stadium: Estadio Nacional; Attendance: 1,870; Referee: Héctor Rodríguez

17 October 2010 Week 11	Hispano	2–0	Motagua	Comayagua
15:00	Flores 44' 67'	Report		Stadium: Estadio Carlos Miranda; Attendance: 2,213; Referee: Erick Andino

24 October 2010 Week 12	Motagua	3–2	Marathón	Tegucigalpa
16:00	Norales 34' (o.g.); Guevara 45'; Guzmán 79'	Report	26' Flores; 90' Palacios	Stadium: Estadio Nacional; Attendance: 474; Referee: Héctor Rodríguez

27 October 2010 Week 13	Platense	2–1	Motagua	Puerto Cortés
19:30	Pereira 28'; Róchez 49'	Report	34' Welcome	Stadium: Estadio Excélsior; Attendance: 2,128; Referee: Miguel Torres

31 October 2010 Week 14	Motagua	1–2	Olimpia	Tegucigalpa
19:30	Arriola 13'	Report	15' Rojas; 65' Días	Stadium: Estadio Nacional; Attendance: 8,269; Referee: Héctor Rodríguez

4 November 2010 Week 15	Motagua	0–2	Vida	Tegucigalpa
19:00		Report	10' (pen.) 87' Bengtson	Stadium: Estadio Nacional; Attendance: 97; Referee: José Pineda

7 November 2010 Week 16	Real España	1–1	Motagua	Puerto Cortés
16:00	Caetano 51'	Report	45' Welcome	Stadium: Estadio Excélsior; Attendance: 897; Referee: Héctor Rodríguez

14 November 2010 Week 17	Motagua	3–0	Victoria	Tegucigalpa
15:00	Alvarado 1'; Welcome 65'; Guzmán 70'	Report		Stadium: Estadio Nacional; Attendance: 394; Referee: Geovanny Mendoza

19 November 2010 Week 18	Motagua	1–0	Deportes Savio	Tegucigalpa
19:00	Leverón 35' (pen.)	Report		Stadium: Estadio Nacional; Attendance: Not reported Referee: Manuel Zelaya

=== Clausura ===
16 January 2011 Week 1	Motagua	1–1	Necaxa	Tegucigalpa
16:00	Guevara 23'	Report	31' Córdoba	Stadium: Estadio Nacional; Attendance: 3,039; Referee: Ronald Hernández

23 January 2011 Week 2	Hispano	0–0	Motagua	Comayagua
15:00		Report		Stadium: Estadio Carlos Miranda; Attendance: 4,234; Referee: Raúl Castro

30 January 2011 Week 3	Motagua	1–0	Marathón	Tegucigalpa
16:00	Bengtson 8'	Report		Stadium: Estadio Nacional; Attendance: 6,639; Referee: José Pineda

2 February 2011 Week 4	Platense	1–3	Motagua	Puerto Cortés
19:30	Rivera 24'	Report	31' Ramírez; 72' Ramírez; 76' Bengtson	Stadium: Estadio Excélsior; Attendance: 2,427; Referee: Héctor Rodríguez

6 February 2011 Week 5	Motagua	2–1	Olimpia	Tegucigalpa
15:00	Caetano 6' (o.g.); Bengtson 34'	Report	90+1' López	Stadium: Estadio Nacional; Attendance: 9,366; Referee: José Pineda

13 February 2011 Week 6	Motagua	2–0	Vida	Tegucigalpa
16:00	Bengtson 26' 57'	Report		Stadium: Estadio Nacional; Attendance: 3,702; Referee: Raúl Castro

19 February 2011 Week 7	Real España	2–1	Motagua	San Pedro Sula
19:30	Valladares 72'; Rodas 76'	Report	88' Bengtson	Stadium: Estadio General Francisco Morazán; Attendance: 2,799; Referee: José Pineda

27 February 2011 Week 8	Motagua	0–2	Victoria	Tegucigalpa
16:00		Report	26' Zelaya; 90+1' Arzú	Stadium: Estadio Nacional; Attendance: 2,582; Referee: Raúl Castro

2 March 2011 Week 9	Deportes Savio	3–3	Motagua	Santa Rosa de Copán
17:30	López 23'; Costa 46' 66' (pen.)	Report	53' Bengtson; 57' Ramírez; 60' Morán	Stadium: Estadio Sergio Antonio Reyes; Attendance: 2,109; Referee: Ronald Hernández

6 March 2011 Week 10	Necaxa	0–1	Motagua	Danlí
14:00		Report	66' Claros	Stadium: Estadio Marcelo Tinoco; Attendance: 3,056; Referee: Armando Castro

13 March 2011 Week 11	Motagua	0–0	Hispano	Tegucigalpa
16:00		Report		Stadium: Estadio Nacional; Attendance: 1,926; Referee: Erick Andino

20 March 2011 Week 12	Marathón	0–1	Motagua	San Pedro Sula
15:30		Report	83' Guevara	Stadium: Estadio Yankel Rosenthal; Attendance: 3,011; Referee: Armando Castro

23 March 2011 Week 13	Motagua	1–1	Platense	Tegucigalpa
19:30	Bengtson 13'	Report	85' Hernández	Stadium: Estadio Nacional; Attendance: 1,406; Referee: Ronald Hernández

26 March 2011 Week 14	Vida	0–0	Motagua	La Ceiba
19:30		Report		Stadium: Estadio Nilmo Edwards; Attendance: 4,075; Referee: Raúl Castro

3 April 2011 Week 15	Olimpia	1–1	Motagua	Tegucigalpa
16:00	Turcios 90'	Report	84' Leverón	Stadium: Estadio Nacional; Attendance: 11,095; Referee: Héctor Rodríguez

10 April 2011 Week 16	Motagua	2–3	Real España	Tegucigalpa
16:00	Bengtson 16'; Mendoza 40'	Report	66' 89' Rodríguez; 90+1' Rodríguez	Stadium: Estadio Nacional; Attendance: 2,710; Referee: José Molina

17 April 2011 Week 17	Victoria	1–2	Motagua	La Ceiba
15:30	Crisanto 57'	Report	73' Mendoza; 85' Girón	Stadium: Estadio Nilmo Edwards; Attendance: 785; Referee: Miguel Torres

20 April 2011 Week 18	Motagua	4–1	Deportes Savio	Tegucigalpa
15:30	Ramírez 12'; Guevara 32'; Bengtson 48' 71'	Report	6' Patiño	Stadium: Estadio Nacional; Attendance: 111; Referee: Ronald Hernández

27 April 2011 Semifinals	Vida	1–0	Motagua	La Ceiba
19:30	Altamirano 78'	Report		Stadium: Estadio Nilmo Edwards; Attendance: 6,067; Referee: Miguel Torres

30 April 2011 Semifinals	Motagua	3–2	Vida	Tegucigalpa
19:30	Bengtson 41' (pen.); Ramírez 80'; Copete 90+2'	Report	58' Genovese; 71' Castro	Stadium: Estadio Nacional; Attendance: 6,836; Referee: Erick Andino
Note: After a 3–3 score on aggregate, F.C. Motagua advanced on better regular season performance.

8 May 2011 Final	Motagua	2–2	Olimpia	Tegucigalpa
16:30	Guevara 42'; Bengtson 67'	Report	10' Caetano; 74' Bruschi	Stadium: Estadio Nacional; Attendance: 12,462; Referee: Raúl Castro

15 May 2011 Final	Olimpia	1–3	Motagua	Tegucigalpa
17:00	de Souza 29'	Report	16' 90+3' (pen.) Bengtson; 46' Guevara	Stadium: Estadio Nacional; Attendance: 23,326; Referee: Héctor Rodríguez
Note: F.C. Motagua won their 12th league title after a 5–3 on aggregate score.

=== CONCACAF Champions League ===
After a two-year absence from international competition, F.C. Motagua participated in the 2010–11 CONCACAF Champions League as invitee; berth originally awarded to Belizean champion, however failed CONCACAF stadium requirements, so the spot vacated was awarded to Honduras (Motagua). In the preliminary round, Motagua faced Canadians Toronto FC being eliminated after a 2–3 aggregated score.

27 July 2010 Preliminary round	Toronto FC (Canada)	1–0	(Honduras) Motagua	Toronto, Canada
20:00 EST	Barrett 20'	Report		Stadium: BMO Field; Attendance: 18,891; Referee: Terry Vaughn (USA) Starting XI: 22 – Morales; 3 – Díaz; 6 – Weber (substituted off) 76'; 7 – Welcome; 8 – Claros; 10 – Córdoba (substituted off) 46'; 12 – Guerrero; 16 – Leverón; 20 – Guevara (substituted off) 46'; 21 – Izaguirre; 23 – Mendoza; Substitutes; 36 – Portillo (substituted on) 46'; 13 – Martínez (substituted on) 46'; 5 – Reyes (substituted on) 76'

3 August 2010 Preliminary round	Motagua (Honduras)	2–2	(Canada) Toronto FC	Tegucigalpa, Honduras
18:00	Guevara 6' 63'	Report	59' De Rosario; 79' Barrett	Stadium: Estadio Nacional; Attendance: 8,000; Referee: Luis Rodríguez (PAN) Starting XI: 22 – Morales; 3 – Díaz (substituted off) 84'; 6 – Weber (substituted off) 65'; 8 – Claros; 10 – Córdoba (substituted off) 62'; 11 – dos Santos; 12 – Guerrero; 16 – Leverón; 20 – Guevara; 21 – Izaguirre; 23 – Mendoza; Substitutes; 9 – Welcome (substituted on) 62'; 36 – Portillo (substituted on) 65'; 5 – Reyes (substituted on) 84'
