= 2009–10 Honduran Liga Nacional =

Liga Nacional
- Season: 2009–10
- Champions: Apertura: Marathón (8th title); Clausura: Olimpia (23rd title)
- Relegated: Real Juventud
- Champions League: Marathón; Olimpia; Motagua
- Top goalscorer: Apertura: Jerry Palacios (13 goals); Clausura: Jerry Bengtson (12 goals)

The 2009–10 Liga Nacional de Fútbol de Honduras season is the 45th season of top-flight professional football in Honduras and the nineteenth season in which the Apertura and Clausura system is used.

Marathón and Olimpia claimed the Apertura and Clausura championships, respectively.

== Club information ==
Ten teams will participate in the 2009–10 season. Nine teams from last season remain for this season. Real Juventud were relegated at the end of the 2008–09 season. They would have been replaced by Liga Nacional de Ascenso de Honduras promotion play-off winners Atlético Gualala. However, both teams decided to merge under the name of Real Juventud prior to the season.

Club	City
Deportes Savio	Santa Rosa de Copán
Hispano	Comayagua
Marathón	San Pedro Sula
Motagua	Tegucigalpa
Olimpia	Tegucigalpa
Platense	Puerto Cortés
Real España	San Pedro Sula
Real Juventud	Santa Bárbara
Victoria	La Ceiba
Vida	La Ceiba

== Torneo Apertura ==
The Torneo Apertura began on July 18, 2009, and ended on November 25, 2009. Marathón, Motagua, Olimpia and Real España qualified for the Apertura final round after ending the tournament in the top four places.

=== Classification stage ===
==== Standings ====
Pos	Team	Pld	W	D	L	GF	GA	GD	Pts	Qualification or relegation
1	Marathón	18	11	5	2	32	16	+16	38	Advanced to the Final Stage
2	Motagua	18	10	5	3	31	14	+17	35	Advanced to the Final Stage
3	Olimpia	18	8	6	4	29	16	+13	30	Advanced to the Final Stage
4	Real España	18	9	3	6	26	20	+6	30	Advanced to the Final Stage
5	Victoria	18	7	5	6	22	27	−5	26	
6	Platense	18	6	6	6	23	25	−2	24	
7	Vida	18	4	6	8	22	33	−11	18	
8	Deportes Savio	18	4	5	9	13	23	−10	17	
9	Hispano	18	4	3	11	17	28	−11	15	
10	Real Juventud	18	3	4	11	19	32	−13	13	

Updated to match(es) played on November 4, 2009. Source: RSSSF
Rules for classification: 1) points; 2) goal difference; 3) number of goals scored.

==== Results ====
Home \ Away	SAV	HIS	MAR	MOT	OLI	PLA	RES	RJU	VIC	VID
Deportes Savio		1–0	0–1	0–2	1–0	1–1	1–0	1–1	0–1	0–1
Hispano	1–0		0–2	2–2	0–0	2–1	0–3	3–0	1–0	2–2
Marathón	1–1	2–1		2–0	2–2	0–2	1–0	4–1	3–0	3–1
Motagua	3–1	1–0	2–2		0–1	2–0	1–0	2–0	3–0	1–2
Olimpia	2–0	1–0	0–2	0–0		1–1	2–0	2–1	6–1	7–1
Platense	1–1	1–0	0–1	2–2	1–1		2–3	1–0	1–1	3–2
Real España	2–1	3–2	3–2	1–2	2–0	1–2		1–0	2–0	1–0
Real Juventud	0–1	4–2	2–3	0–3	1–1	3–1	2–2		2–2	2–1
Victoria	4–1	2–0	0–0	0–4	2–1	4–0	1–1	1–0		2–2
Vida	2–2	3–1	1–1	1–1	1–2	0–3	1–1	1–0	0–1	

Updated to match(es) played on November 4, 2009. Source: RSSSF
Legend: Blue = home team win; Yellow = draw; Red = away team win.

=== Final stage ===
The Final Stage ran from November 7, 2009, to November 25, 2009. Two-legged ties in this stage were settled by points: three for a win, one for a draw, and zero for a loss. Ties in points in the semifinals were settled first by goal difference, followed by the Classification Stage standings. A tie in points in the Finals would be settled by goal difference first, followed by two 15-minute extra-time periods, then a penalty shootout if necessary.

==== Semifinals ====
Semifinal A
Pos	Team	Pld	W	D	L	GF	GA	GD	Pts	Qualification or relegation
1	Marathón	2	1	0	1	3	3	0	3	Advanced to the Finals (Note: Marathón advanced because of better classification standing.)
2	Real España	2	1	0	1	3	3	0	3	

Rules for classification: 1st points; 2nd goal difference; 3rd best classification stage standing.
Notes:
November 7, 2009
19:30 (UTC-6)

Real España	1–2	Marathón
Lucas 31' (o.g.)		Palacios 15'; Ramírez 48'

Estadio Francisco Morazán, San Pedro Sula
Attendance: 6,408
Referee: José Cálix

November 10, 2009
19:30 (UTC-6)

Marathón	1–2	Real España
Palacios 13'		Caetano 10'; González 50'

Estadio Olímpico Metropolitano, San Pedro Sula
Referee: Geovanny Mendoza

Semifinal B
Pos	Team	Pld	W	D	L	GF	GA	GD	Pts	Qualification or relegation
1	Olimpia	2	1	0	1	2	1	+1	3	Advanced to the Finals
2	Motagua	2	1	0	1	1	2	−1	3	

Rules for classification: 1st points; 2nd goal difference; 3rd best classification stage standing.
November 7, 2009
19:30 (UTC-6)

Olimpia	0–1	Motagua
		Diduch 41' (pen.)

Estadio Tiburcio Carías Andino, Tegucigalpa
Attendance: 6,408
Referee: Óscar Moncada

November 10, 2009
19:30 (UTC-6)

Motagua	0–2	Olimpia
		Rojas 14'; Turcios 85'

Estadio Tiburcio Carías Andino, Tegucigalpa
Referee: Benigno Pineda

==== Finals ====
Pos	Team	Pld	W	D	L	GF	GA	GD	Pts	Qualification or relegation
1	Marathón	2	1	0	1	2	1	+1	3	2010–11 CONCACAF Champions League preliminary round
2	Olimpia	2	1	0	1	1	2	−1	3	

Rules for classification: 1st points; 2nd extra time; 3rd penalty shootout.
November 22, 2009
16:00 (UTC-6)

Olimpia	1–0	Marathón
Rosales 70'

Estadio Tiburcio Carías Andino, Tegucigalpa
Attendance: 12,477
Referee: Óscar Moncada

November 25, 2009
19:30 (UTC-6)

Marathón	2–0	Olimpia
Ramírez 5'; Palacios 64'

Estadio Olímpico Metropolitano, San Pedro Sula
Referee: Benigno Pineda

Marathón	Olimpia

GK	27	(Uruguay) Juan Obelar
RB	23	(Honduras) Mauricio Sabillón
CB	4	(Uruguay) Máximo Lucas	(substituted off) 67'
CB	5	(Honduras) Erick Norales
LB	6	(Honduras) Juan Carlos García
CM	3	(Honduras) Astor Henríquez	(substituted off) 63'
CM	19	(Honduras) Mario Berríos
AM	11	(Guatemala) Guillermo Ramírez	(substituted off) 73'
RF	15	(Honduras) Walter Martínez
CF	10	(Honduras) Jerry Palacios
LF	22	(Honduras) Mitchel Brown
Substitutions:
MF	–	(Honduras) Mario Rodríguez	(substituted on) 63'
DF	–	(Honduras) Luis Santamaría	(substituted on) 67'
MF	–	(Honduras) Mariano Acevedo	(substituted on) 73'
Manager:
(Uruguay) Manuel Keosseian

GK	27	(Honduras) Noel Valladares
RB	30	(Honduras) Johnny Palacios
CB	4	(Brazil) Fabio de Souza
CB	–	(Honduras) Jaime Rosales
LB	7	(Honduras) Rony Morales
DM	–	(Honduras) Franklin Arévalo
CM	–	(Honduras) Rubén Matamoros
CM	–	(Honduras) Johnny Calderón	(substituted off) 69'
AM	–	(Honduras) Danilo Turcios
CF	11	(Honduras) Wilmer Velásquez	(substituted off) 69'
CF	33	(Uruguay) Ramiro Bruschi	(substituted off) 74'
Substitutions:
MF	–	(Honduras) Erick Andino	(substituted on) 69'
FW	–	(Brazil) Everaldo Ferreira	(substituted on) 69'
FW	–	(Brazil) Jocimar Nascimento	(substituted on) 74'
Manager:
(Honduras) Juan Carlos Espinoza

Liga Nacional
2009–10 Apertura champion

8th title

=== Top goalscorers ===
Pos	Player	Team	Goals
1	(Honduras) Jerry Palacios	Marathón	13
2	(Honduras) Georgie Welcome	Motagua	11
3	(Colombia) Mauricio Copete	Victoria	9
4	(Honduras) Mitchel Brown	Marathón	8
4	(Honduras) Wilmer Velásquez	Olimpia	8
6	(Honduras) Jerry Bengtson	Vida	7
6	(Colombia) Charles Córdoba	Vida	7
6	(Belize) Harrison Róchez	Platense	7
9	(Brazil) Douglas Caetano	Real España	6
10	(Honduras) Pompilio Cacho	Real Juventud	5
10	(Honduras) Randy Diamond	Real Juventud	5
10	(Argentina) Sergio Diduch	Motagua	5

== Torneo Clausura ==
The Torneo Clausura will begin in January 2010 and end in May 2010. The best four clubs will qualify for the Clausura final round.

=== Classification stage ===
==== Standings ====
Pos	Team	Pld	W	D	L	GF	GA	GD	Pts	Qualification or relegation
1	Motagua	18	11	3	4	28	15	+13	36	Advanced to the Final Stage
2	Olimpia	18	8	8	2	26	11	+15	32	Advanced to the Final Stage
3	Vida	18	8	4	6	25	20	+5	28	Advanced to the Final Stage
4	Platense	18	7	7	4	23	19	+4	28	Advanced to the Final Stage
5	Hispano	18	8	3	7	22	22	0	27	
6	Real España	18	7	4	7	28	29	−1	25	
7	Marathón	18	4	7	7	23	24	−1	19	
8	Real Juventud	18	6	4	8	25	28	−3	19 (Note: Real Juventud was docked three points.)	
9	Deportes Savio	18	4	5	9	13	23	−10	17	
10	Victoria	18	2	5	11	15	37	−22	11	

Updated to match(es) played on April 17, 2010. Source: RSSSF
Rules for classification: 1) points; 2) goal difference; 3) number of goals scored.

==== Results ====
Home \ Away	SAV	HIS	MAR	MOT	OLI	PLA	RES	RJU	VIC	VID
Deportes Savio		2–1	0–2	0–0	0–1	0–0	1–2	0–2	2–0	1–0
Hispano	1–0		1–1	3–1	2–0	1–1	2–1	1–0	2–0	0–1
Marathón	3–0	2–3		3–4	1–1	0–1	1–2	2–1	2–2	0–1
Motagua	1–1	1–0	1–0		1–0	3–0	1–0	3–1	3–0	3–2
Olimpia	0–0	4–0	2–0	0–0		1–1	2–0	0–0	6–0	2–1
Platense	3–0	1–1	0–1	2–1	0–0		3–2	3–1	2–0	1–1
Real España	3–4	1–0	1–1	2–1	2–2	3–1		2–2	0–1	1–2
Real Juventud	3–2	3–1	1–1	0–3	1–2	2–0	2–0		1–1	2–0
Victoria	0–0	1–2	1–1	1–0	1–2	1–3	2–2	3–2		1–3
Vida	1–0	2–1	2–2	0–1	1–1	1–1	1–2	4–1	2–0	

Updated to match(es) played on April 17, 2010. Source: RSSSF
Legend: Blue = home team win; Yellow = draw; Red = away team win.

=== Final stage ===
==== Semifinals ====
Semifinal A
Pos	Team	Pld	W	D	L	GF	GA	GD	Pts	Qualification or relegation
1	Motagua	2	0	2	0	2	2	0	2	Advanced to the Finals (Note: Motagua advanced because of better classification standing.)
2	Platense	2	0	2	0	2	2	0	2	

Rules for classification: 1st points; 2nd goal difference; 3rd best classification stage standing.
Notes:
April 25, 2010
17:00 (UTC-6)

Platense	2–2	Motagua
Róchez 49', 63'	Report	dos Santos 14'; Guevara 16'

Estadio Excelsior, Puerto Cortés

April 28, 2010
21:30 (UTC-6)

Motagua	0–0	Platense
	Report

Estadio Tiburcio Carías Andino, Tegucigalpa

Semifinal B
Pos	Team	Pld	W	D	L	GF	GA	GD	Pts	Qualification or relegation
1	Olimpia	2	0	2	0	3	3	0	2	Advanced to the Finals (Note: Olimpia advanced because of better classification standing.)
2	Vida	2	0	2	0	3	3	0	2	

Rules for classification: Rules for classification: 1st points; 2nd goal difference; 3rd best classification stage standing.
Notes:
April 24, 2010
21:30 (UTC-6)

Vida	2–2	Olimpia
Bengston 28'; Córdoba 48'	Report	Turcios 8', 39'

Estadio Nilmo Edwards, La Ceiba

April 27, 2010
21:30 (UTC-6)

Olimpia	1–1	Vida
Bruschi 57'	Report	Avila 43'

Estadio Tiburcio Carías Andino, Tegucigalpa

==== Final ====
Pos	Team	Pld	W	D	L	GF	GA	GD	Pts	Qualification or relegation
1	Olimpia	2	1	0	1	3	2	+1	3	2010–11 CONCACAF Champions League Group Stage (Note: As champion with better aggregate record.)
2	Motagua	2	1	0	1	2	3	−1	3	2010–11 CONCACAF Champions League preliminary round (Note: Berth reallocated from Nicaragua.)

Rules for classification: 1st points; 2nd extra time; 3rd penalty shootout.
Notes:
2 May 2010
16:00 (UTC-06)

Olimpia	3 – 1	Motagua
Tilguath 23'; Rojas 40' 58'	Report	Cabrita 73'

Estadio Tiburcio Carías Andino
Tegucigalpa
Attendance: 13,819
Referee: Armando Castro

Olimpia	Motagua

GK	28	(Honduras) Donis Escober
DF	4	(Brazil) Fabio de Souza
DF	30	(Honduras) Johnny Palacios
DF	32	(Honduras) Oscar García
DF	19	(Honduras) Johnny Calderón
MF	20	(Honduras) Walter Hernández
MF	10	(Honduras) Danilo Turcios (C)	(substituted off) 67'
MF	–	(Honduras) Ramón Núñez	(yellow card) 84'
FW	–	(Honduras) Reynaldo Tilguath	(substituted off) 65'	(yellow card) 25'
FW	21	(Honduras) Roger Rojas
FW	–	(Brazil) Everaldo Ferreira	(substituted off) 75'
Substitutions:
MF	–	(Honduras) Miguel Castillo	(substituted on) 65'	(yellow card) 76'
DF	–	(Honduras) Wilfredo Barahona	(substituted on) 67'
FW	33	(Uruguay) Ramiro Bruschi	(substituted on) 75'
Manager:
(Colombia) Carlos Restrepo

GK	1	(Honduras) Ricardo Canales
DF	3	(Uruguay) Guillermo Díaz
DF	5	(Honduras) Milton Reyes
DF	23	(Honduras) Sergio Mendoza
DF	12	(Honduras) Iván Guerrero
MF	8	(Honduras) Jorge Claros
MF	21	(Honduras) Emilio Izaguirre	(substituted off) 60'
MF	6	(Uruguay) Mauricio Weber	(yellow card) 90'
MF	20	(Honduras) Amado Guevara (C)	(substituted off) 75'
FW	11	(Brazil) Marcelo Cabrita	(yellow card) 62'
FW	7	(Honduras) Georgie Welcome	(substituted off) 46'
Substitutions:
FW	10	(Argentina) Sergio Diduch	(substituted on) 46'
MF	36	(Honduras) Javier Portillo	(substituted on) 60'
MF	13	(Honduras) Ronald Martínez	(substituted on) 75'
Manager:
(Honduras) Ramón Maradiaga

8 May 2010
19:30 (UTC-06)

Motagua	1 – 0	Olimpia
Welcome 38'	Report

Estadio Tiburcio Carías Andino
Tegucigalpa
Attendance: 16,299
Referee: Benigno Pineda

Motagua	Olimpia

GK	22	(Honduras) Donaldo Morales
DF	3	(Uruguay) Guillermo Díaz
DF	4	(Honduras) Johnny Leverón
DF	23	(Honduras) Sergio Mendoza
DF	12	(Honduras) Iván Guerrero (C)
DF	21	(Honduras) Emilio Izaguirre
MF	8	(Honduras) Jorge Claros	(yellow card) 23'
MF	13	(Honduras) Ronald Martínez	(substituted off) 65'
MF	6	(Uruguay) Mauricio Weber	(yellow card) 47'	(substituted off) 78'
FW	11	(Brazil) Marcelo Cabrita	(yellow card) 41'	(substituted off) 46'
FW	7	(Honduras) Georgie Welcome	(red card) 48'
Substitutions:
FW	9	(Honduras) Shannon Welcome	(substituted on) 46'
MF	36	(Honduras) Javier Portillo	(substituted on) 65'
FW	10	(Argentina) Sergio Diduch	(substituted on) 78'
Manager:
(Honduras) Ramón Maradiaga

GK	28	(Honduras) Donis Escober
DF	4	(Brazil) Fábio de Souza
DF	30	(Honduras) Johnny Palacios	(yellow card) 41'
DF	19	(Honduras) Johnny Calderón	(yellow card) 66'
DF	32	(Honduras) Oscar García
MF	20	(Honduras) Walter Hernández
MF	10	(Honduras) Danilo Turcios (C)	(substituted off) 78'
MF	–	(Honduras) Ramón Núñez	(substituted off) 67'
FW	–	(Honduras) Reynaldo Tilguath	(yellow card) 82'
FW	21	(Honduras) Roger Rojas	(yellow card) 22'
FW	–	(Brazil) Everaldo Ferreira	(substituted off) 70'
Substitutions:
MF	–	(Honduras) Miguel Castillo	(substituted on) 67'	(yellow card) 90'
FW	33	(Uruguay) Ramiro Bruschi	(substituted on) 70'
MF	–	(Honduras) Frank Arévalo	(substituted on) 78'
Manager:
(Colombia) Carlos Restrepo

- Olimpia won 3–2 on aggregate.

Liga Nacional
2009–10 Clausura champion

23rd title

=== Top goalscorers ===
Pos	Player	Team	Goals
1	(Honduras) Jerry Bengtson	Vida	12
2	(Honduras) Carlos Pavón	Real España	10
3	(Honduras) Roger Rojas	Olimpia	8
4	(Honduras) Elmer Zelaya	Real Juventud	7
5	(Colombia) Mauricio Copete	Victoria	6
5	(Colombia) Charles Córdoba	Vida	6
5	(Brazil) Douglas Caetano	Real España	6
5	(Honduras) Héctor Flores	Hispano	6
5	(Honduras) Walter Martínez	Marathón	5
5	(Honduras) Georgie Welcome	Motagua	6

== Relegation ==
Relegation to the 2010–11 Liga Nacional de Ascenso de Honduras is determined from an aggregate table of the Apertura and Clausura tournaments. The team with the worst overall record will be relegated.

Pos	Team	Pld	W	D	L	GF	GA	GD	Pts	Qualification or relegation
1	Motagua	36	21	8	7	59	29	+30	71	Qualified to the 2010–11 CONCACAF Champions League
2	Olimpia	36	16	14	6	55	27	+28	62	Qualified to the 2010–11 CONCACAF Champions League
3	Marathón	36	15	12	9	55	40	+15	57	Qualified to the 2010–11 CONCACAF Champions League
4	Real España	36	15	7	14	52	49	+3	52	
5	Platense	36	13	13	10	46	44	+2	52	
6	Vida	36	12	10	14	47	53	−6	46	
7	Hispano	36	12	6	18	39	50	−11	42	
8	Victoria	36	10	10	16	37	62	−25	40	
9	Deportes Savio	36	8	10	18	26	46	−20	34	
10	Real Juventud	36	9	8	19	44	60	−16	32 (Note: Real Juventud was docked three points for failing to settle debts to former players by April 12.)	Relegated to the Liga Nacional de Ascenso

Updated to match(es) played on May 8, 2010. Source: RSSSF
Rules for classification: 1) points; 2) goal difference; 3) number of goals scored.
