= Honduran Liga Nacional records and statistics =

Honduran football league records

This page details Honduran football league records.

== All-time table ==
- From 1965–66 to 2018–19 Clausura
- Only regular season computed
- 2 points per win
- Highlighted in green currently active (2022-23 season)

Pos	Team	Pld	W	D	L	GF	GA	GD	Pts
1	Olimpia	1607	800	531	276	2413	1325	+1088	2131
2	Motagua	1607	659	541	407	2079	1572	+507	1859
3	Real España	1607	615	549	443	2033	1653	+380	1779
4	Marathón	1607	624	530	453	2134	1757	+377	1778
5	Platense	1578	498	540	540	1792	1868	−76	1536
6	Vida	1607	466	566	575	1741	2030	−289	1498
7	Victoria	1300	393	452	455	1469	1634	−165	1238
8	Pumas UNAH / Broncos UNAH	796	202	281	313	690	901	−211	685
9	Broncos	399	105	146	148	369	472	−103	356
10	Deportes Savio	324	85	98	141	337	483	−146	268
11	Honduras Progreso	288	95	62	131	379	485	−106	252
12	Real Sociedad	216	78	68	70	279	244	+35	224
13	Real Maya / Real Patepluma	247	54	95	98	231	292	−61	203
14	Hispano	215	62	62	91	248	296	−48	186
15	Atlético Indio	216	54	77	85	210	275	−65	185
16	Sula / Juventud de Sula	189	40	75	74	143	179	−36	155
17	Atlético Morazán	156	41	68	47	149	171	−22	150
18	Petrotela / Tela Timsa	153	40	53	60	132	179	−47	133
19	Juticalpa	144	37	44	63	194	206	−12	118
20	Federal	153	30	58	65	137	204	−67	118
21	Independiente Villela	151	24	58	69	149	241	−92	106
22	Atlético Olanchano	0	0	0	0	0	0	0	0
23	Atlético Español	108	20	33	55	123	194	−71	73
24	UPNFM	72	27	18	27	87	91	−4	72
25	Troya	90	25	19	46	76	130	−54	69
26	Súper Estrella	108	16	36	56	89	197	−108	68
27	Atlético Choloma	72	18	31	23	91	101	−10	67
28	Municipal Valencia	72	21	24	27	62	73	−11	66
29	Necaxa	72	20	22	30	79	88	−9	62
30	Parrillas One	72	19	21	32	104	128	−24	59
31	Lempira	81	17	20	44	82	134	−52	54
32	Dandy	63	12	29	22	42	57	−15	53
33	Real Juventud	72	16	18	38	72	105	−33	50
34	Curacao	54	10	24	20	43	68	−25	44
35	La Salle / San Pedro	54	13	16	25	81	119	−38	42
36	E.A.C.I.	54	9	20	25	32	55	−23	38
37	Deportes Progreseño	54	10	16	28	46	87	−41	36
38	Real Comayagua	36	7	14	15	42	57	−15	28
39	Honduras Salzburg	36	5	15	16	31	49	−18	25
40	Palestino	40	7	11	22	48	81	−33	25
41	Real de Minas	36	7	10	19	36	60	−24	24
42	Verdún	27	5	11	11	10	25	−15	21
43	Social Sol	36	4	12	20	29	56	−27	20
44	Portuario	27	6	7	14	29	55	−26	19
45	Tiburones	27	4	10	13	20	34	−14	18
46	Campamento	27	4	5	18	13	42	−29	13
47	Atlántida	27	3	5	19	12	48	−36	11
48	Olancho	141	33	39	69	159	221	−62	105

== Winning percentage ==
- As of 2018–19
- Method of calculation: 1 point per win, 0.5 points per draw; divided by games played

—	Regular season				Post season				Total combined			
Club	W	D	L	Per.	W	D	L	Per.	W	D	L	Per.
Olimpia	800	531	276	0.663	131	115	72	0.593	931	646	348	0.651
Motagua	659	541	407	0.578	86	87	70	0.533	745	628	477	0.572
Real España	615	549	443	0.554	100	76	75	0.550	715	625	518	0.553
Marathón	624	530	453	0.553	69	74	83	0.469	693	604	536	0.543
Real Sociedad	78	68	70	0.519	8	5	15	0.375	86	73	85	0.502
UPNFM	27	18	27	0.500	2	2	4	0.375	29	20	31	0.488
Platense	498	540	540	0.487	21	42	41	0.404	519	582	581	0.482
Victoria	393	452	455	0.476	31	28	50	0.413	424	480	505	0.471
Vida	466	566	575	0.466	25	31	40	0.422	491	597	615	0.464
Atlético Morazán	41	68	47	0.481	0	3	7	0.150	41	71	54	0.461
Atlético Choloma	18	31	23	0.465	1	2	2	0.400	19	33	25	0.461
Municipal Valencia	21	24	27	0.458	0	1	1	0.250	21	25	28	0.453
Broncos	105	146	148	0.446	5	15	10	0.417	110	161	158	0.444
Honduras Progreso	95	62	131	0.438	6	6	4	0.563	101	68	135	0.444
Universidad / Broncos UNAH	202	281	313	0.430	12	14	12	0.500	214	295	325	0.433
Tela Timsa / Petrotela	40	53	60	0.435	2	4	4	0.400	42	57	64	0.433
Hispano	62	62	91	0.433	1	0	1	0.500	63	62	92	0.433
Atlético Indio	54	77	85	0.428	0	0	0	0.000	54	77	85	0.428
Necaxa	20	22	30	0.431	0	1	1	0.250	20	23	31	0.426
Dandy	12	29	22	0.421	0	0	0	0.000	12	29	22	0.421
Sula	40	75	74	0.410	3	5	2	0.550	43	80	76	0.417
Deportes Savio	85	98	141	0.414	4	0	4	0.500	89	98	145	0.416
Parrillas One	19	21	32	0.410	1	0	1	0.500	20	21	33	0.412
Real Maya	54	95	98	0.411	1	1	2	0.375	55	96	100	0.410
Curacao	10	24	20	0.407	0	1	1	0.250	10	25	21	0.402
Juticalpa	37	44	63	0.410	1	0	5	0.167	38	44	68	0.400
San Pedro / La Salle	13	16	25	0.389	0	0	0	0.000	13	16	25	0.389
Real Comayagua	7	14	15	0.389	0	0	0	0.000	7	14	15	0.389
Verdún	5	11	11	0.389	0	0	0	0.000	5	11	11	0.389
Troya	25	19	46	0.383	0	0	0	0.000	25	19	46	0.383
Federal	30	58	65	0.386	1	0	3	0.250	31	58	68	0.382
E.A.C.I.	9	20	25	0.352	0	0	0	0.000	9	20	25	0.352
Portuario	6	7	14	0.352	0	0	0	0.000	6	7	14	0.352
Campamento / Atlético Olanchano	37	44	87	0.351	0	0	0	0.000	37	44	87	0.351
Independiente Villela	24	58	69	0.351	0	0	0	0.000	24	58	69	0.351
Real Juventud	16	18	38	0.347	0	0	0	0.000	16	18	38	0.347
Honduras Salzburg	5	15	16	0.347	0	0	0	0.000	5	15	16	0.347
Real de Minas	7	10	19	0.333	1	0	1	0.500	8	10	20	0.342
Atlético Español	20	33	55	0.338	0	0	0	0.000	20	33	55	0.338
Lempira	17	20	44	0.333	0	0	0	0.000	17	20	44	0.333
Deportes Progreseño	10	16	28	0.333	0	0	0	0.000	10	16	28	0.333
Tiburones	4	10	13	0.333	0	0	0	0.000	4	10	13	0.333
Súper Estrella	16	36	56	0.315	0	0	0	0.000	16	36	56	0.315
Palestino	7	11	22	0.313	0	0	0	0.000	7	11	22	0.313
Social Sol	4	12	20	0.278	0	0	0	0.000	4	12	20	0.278
Atlántida	3	5	19	0.204	0	0	0	0.000	3	5	19	0.204

== Records ==
- Most league titles: 32
  - Olimpia: 1966–67, 1967–68, 1969–70, 1971–72, 1977–78, 1982–83, 1984–85, 1986–87, 1987–88, 1989–90, 1992–93, 1995–96, 1996–97, 1998–99, 2000–01 A, 2002–03 A, 2003–04 C, 2004–05 C, 2005–06 A, 2005–06 C, 2007–08 C, 2008–09 C, 2009–10 C, 2011–12 A, 2011–12 C, 2012–13 A, 2012–13 C, 2013–14 C, 2014–15 C, 2015–16 C, 2019–20 A, 2020–21 A
- Most consecutive league titles: 4
  - Olimpia: 2011–12 A, 2011–12 C, 2012–13 A, 2012–13 C
- Largest attendance: 38,256
  - 17 December 2006, Olimpia 1–3 Motagua at San Pedro Sula
- Most appearances: 55
  - Marathón, Motagua, Olimpia, Real España and Vida
- Fewest defeats in season: 0
  - Olimpia: 1969–70
- Goals scored so far: 21,003
  - As of 2019–20 C

== Players ==
=== Top scorers ===
As of 27 July 2024

Player	Clubs (goals)	Goals
(Honduras) Wilmer Velásquez	Olimpia (196)	196
(Honduras) Jerry Bengtson	Olimpia (127), Vida (36), Motagua (26)	189
(Brazil) Denilson Costa	Olimpia (99), Marathón (24), Motagua (20), Platense (11), Atlético Olanchano (1)	155
(Honduras) Rubilio Castillo	Motagua (99), Vida (18), Deportes Savio (5)	123
(Honduras) Juan Cárcamo	Platense (65), Olimpia (31), Victoria (4), Real Sociedad (1)	101
(Uruguay) Claudio Cardozo	Real España (69), Marathón (18), Vida (13)	100
(Honduras) Rony Martínez	Real Sociedad (76), Real España (13), Olimpia (10)	99
(Brazil) Marcelo Ferreira	Platense (30), Olimpia (25), Broncos (17), Atlético Olanchano (13), Motagua (8), Marathón (3), Real Juventud (2)	98
(Honduras) Francisco Ramírez	Platense (54), Motagua (36), Marathón (4), Vida (1)	95
(Honduras) Luis Ramírez	Marathón (24), Victoria (24), Deportes Savio (13), Real España (12); Independiente Villela (5), Vida (5), Universidad (3), Honduras Salzburg (3)	89
(Honduras) Roger Rojas	Olimpia (89)	89
(Brazil) Luciano Emílio	Real España (45), Olimpia (44)	89
(Honduras) Prudencio Norales	Olimpia (73), Súper Estrella (9), Curacao (3), Atlético Indio (3)	88
(Argentina) Danilo Tosello	Olimpia (86)	86
(Honduras) Óscar Hernández	Motagua (66), Marathón (15), Portuario (3)	84
(Brazil) Ney Costa	Deportes Savio (43), Atlético Olanchano (16), Vida (14), Hispano (10), Real España (1)	84
(Honduras) Eduardo Bennett	Victoria (34), Olimpia (24), Curacao (12), Vida (8), Atlético Olanchano (5)	83
(Honduras) Ángel Obando	Motagua (77), Atlético Morazán (5), Universidad (1)	83
(Honduras) Carlos Pavón	Real España (81)	81
(Honduras) Pompilio Cacho	Marathón (56), Motagua (12), Real Juventud (5), Hispano (4), Vida (4)	81
(Argentina) Luis Altamirano	Broncos (41), Universidad (34), Motagua (5)	80
(Honduras) Reynaldo Mejía	Olimpia (40), Victoria (30), Real España (10)	80
(Honduras) Carlos Alvarado	Vida (76), Olimpia (3)	79
(Honduras) Gilberto Machado	Marathón (78)	78

=== By team ===
- Updated 17 January 2021

Player	Club	Goals
(Honduras) Wilmer Velásquez	Olimpia	196
(Honduras) Rubilio Castillo	Motagua	99
(Honduras) Carlos Pavón	Real España	81
(Honduras) Gilberto Machado	Marathón	78
(Honduras) Carlos Alvarado	Vida	76
(Honduras) Rony Martínez	Real Sociedad	76
(Honduras) Juan Cárcamo	Platense	65
(Honduras) Carlos Lanza	Juticalpa	54
(Colombia) Andrés Copete	Victoria	47
(Honduras) Daniel Sambulá	Universidad	43
(Brazil) Ney Costa	Deportes Savio	43
(Argentina) Luis Altamirano	Broncos	41
(Honduras) Ángel Tejeda	Honduras Progreso	37
(Argentina) Sergio Diduch	Hispano	30
(Uruguay) Óscar Torlacoff	Atlético Choloma	29
(Honduras) Juan Mejía	Real de Minas	28
(Honduras) Franco Güity	UPNFM	22
(Honduras) José Enamorado	Sula	21
(Honduras) Jorge Arriola	Real Maya	20
(Honduras) Ramón Morandel	Atlético Morazán	19
(Honduras) Enrique Grey	La Salle / San Pedro	17
(Honduras) Édgar Núñez	Atlético Olanchano	17
(Honduras) Rubén Licona	Necaxa	15
(Honduras) Jorge Urquía	Atlético Indio	13
(Honduras) Eduardo Bennett	Curacao	13
(Honduras) Jorge Arriola	Súper Estrella	13
(Honduras) Fran Urbina	Lempira	11
(Honduras) Luis Lobo	Parrillas One	11
(Honduras) Marcos Peña	Independiente Villela	10
(Honduras) Gilberto Acosta	Troya	10

=== Most appearances ===
- Updated 17 January 2021

R	Player	App.
1	(Honduras) Leonardo Isaula	511
2	(Honduras) Júnior Izaguirre	508
3	(Honduras) Rony Morales	501
4	(Honduras) Mauricio Sabillón	486
5	(Brazil) Denilson Costa	481
6	(Honduras) Mario Berríos	474
7	(Honduras) Carlos Mejía	467
8	(Honduras) Óscar Bonilla	456
9	(Honduras) Elkin González	451
10	(Honduras) Sergio Mendoza	435
11	(Honduras) Javier Portillo (active)	434
12	(Honduras) Ricardo Canales (active)	433
13	(Honduras) Edder Delgado	423
14	(Honduras) Mario Beata	421
15	(Honduras) Noel Valladares	413
16	(Honduras) Wilmer Velásquez	412
17	(Honduras) Merlyn Membreño	409
18	(Honduras) Carlos Discua	408
19	(Honduras) Wilmer Crisanto (active)	407
20	(Honduras) Carlos Palacios	401
21	(Brazil) Fábio de Souza	398
22	(Honduras) Reynaldo Tilguath	380
23	(Honduras) Nahúm Espinoza	365
24	(Honduras) Wilfredo Barahona	365
25	(Honduras) Nery Medina	359

=== Most goals in one season ===
- As of 2019–20 Apertura

Player	Club	Season	Goals
(Honduras) Gilberto Machado	Marathón	1987–88	22
(Honduras) Jorge Arriola	Real Maya	1992–93	19
(Honduras) Wilmer Velásquez	Olimpia	1997–98 A	19
(Honduras) Anthony Lozano	Olimpia	2014–15 C	19

=== Most goals in one game ===
- As of 2019–20 Apertura

Player	Club	Opponent	Score	Date	Goals
(Honduras) Arturo Garden	Vida	Marathón	5–1	25 June 1967	5
(Honduras) Carlos Alvarado	Vida	Troya	6–0	8 October 1972	5
(Honduras) Jorge Arriola	Real Maya	Súper Estrella	10–2	21 March 1993	5
(Honduras) Marlon Hernández	Olimpia	Real España	7–0	21 January 1996	5
(Honduras) Roger Rojas	Olimpia	Vida	7–1	8 February 2017	5
(Honduras) Carlos Suazo	Olimpia	La Salle	10–2	29 August 1965	4
(Brazil) Armando Valenchina	Vida	Federal	4–2	27 March 1976	4
(Honduras) Luis Zúniga	Victoria	Portuario	5–0	4 March 1979	4
(Argentina) Luis Altamirano	Broncos	Vida	4–0	4 May 1979	4
(Honduras) Prudencio Norales	Olimpia	Portuario	6–2	22 July 1979	4
(Honduras) Raúl Centeno	Platense	Universidad	4–0	9 June 1985	4
(Honduras) Juan Anariba	Real España	Sula	6–2	13 October 1988	4
(Honduras) Eduardo Bennett	Olimpia	Victoria	5–3	14 April 1991	4
(Honduras) Luis Vallejo	Real España	Súper Estrella	5–1	6 September 1992	4
(Brazil) Denilson Costa	Motagua	Independiente Villela	7–2	6 April 1997	4
(Honduras) Wilmer Velásquez	Olimpia	Victoria	6–1	2 September 2009	4
(Honduras) Bryan Róchez	Real España	Marathón	6–1	22 March 2014	4
(Honduras) Juan Mejía	Real de Minas	Motagua	4–4	14 August 2019	4

=== Most hat-tricks ===
Player	HT
(Honduras) Wilmer Velásquez	7
(Honduras) Carlos Pavón	5
(Honduras) Rony Martínez	4

=== Most top scorer titles ===
- As of 2018–19

Player	Titles	Seasons
(Argentina) Luis Altamirano	4	1980–81, 1981–82, 1982–83, 1984–85
(Brazil) Luciano Emílio	4	2002–03 C, 2003–04 C, 2004–05 A, 2005–06 C
(Honduras) Wilmer Velásquez	4	1997–98 A, 1997–98 C, 1999–00 A, 2007–08 C
(Honduras) Jerry Bengtson	4	2009–10 C, 2010–11 A, 2010–11 C, 2018–19

=== Most appearances in a team ===
- (Honduras) Mauricio Sabillón Marathon 486

=== Most consecutive matches scoring ===
- (Chile) Rubén Rodríguez Platense 8 (28 Jul to 15 September 1974)

=== Fastest 50 goals ===
- (Brazil) Luciano Emilio Real C.D. España, Olimpia 70 (games)

=== Youngest goalscorer 50 goals ===
- (Honduras) Roger Rojas Club Deportivo Olimpia 22 years 299 days vs Platense F.C.

=== Fastest goalscorer 100 goals ===
- (Honduras) Rubilio Castillo | Deportes Savio, C.D.S. Vida, F.C. Motagua 188 games

=== Youngest goalscorer 100 goals ===
- (Honduras) Rubilio Castillo 26 years 259 days vs Real C.D. España

== Head to head ==
List of Liga Nacional clubs head-to-head comparison (incomplete).

Atlético Choloma v
Opponent	Record	Goals	As of
Deportes Savio	3–2–3	13:13	13 April 2013
Marathón	2–7–1	14:12	20 April 2013
Motagua	0–4–4	2:8	3 April 2013
Necaxa	1–1–2	2:3	18 April 2012
Olimpia	3–2–5	7:14	6 March 2013
Platense	4–3–1	13:6	15 March 2013
Real España	0–3–7	10:22	2 March 2013
Real Sociedad	1–2–1	6:5	10 March 2013
Victoria	2–5–1	10:12	6 April 2013
Vida	3–4–1	18:13	24 March 2013
Atlético Olanchano v
Opponent	Record	Goals	As of
Marathón	2–3–11	10:27	19 March 2008
Motagua	3–4–9	18:26	8 March 2008
Municipal Valencia	1–2–1	5:4	28 April 2005
Olimpia	0–4–12	7:28	6 April 2008
Platense	4–8–4	24:26	20 April 2008
Real España	5–2–9	20:26	27 April 2008
Real Patepluma	1–1–0	5:2	5 October 2003
Universidad / Broncos UNAH	6–2–4	16:13	15 April 2007
Victoria	2–5–8	16:27	13 April 2008
Vida	5–4–7	26:28	12 March 2008
Broncos v
Opponent	Record	Goals	As of
Deportes Savio	1–4–0	6:3	21 June 2001
Motagua	4–22–22	26:56	6 May 2001
Deportes Savio v
Opponent	Record	Goals	As of
Marathón	11–9–16	38:57	26 March 2014
Motagua	7–14–15	33:51	2 March 2014
Necaxa	3–1–4	11:16	18 March 2012
Olimpia	3–12–21	31:68	13 April 2014
Parrillas One	1–2–1	5:6	16 March 2014
Platense	14–11–13	53:51	6 April 2014
Real Comayagua	0–2–2	3:9	12 May 2002
Real España	8–12–16	39:56	9 March 2014
Real Sociedad	4–3–3	11:12	19 March 2014
Universidad	2–1–5	6:11	28 April 2002
Victoria	11–10–17	43:58	22 March 2014
Vida	12–11–15	46:48	30 March 2014
Hispano v
Opponent	Record	Goals	As of
Marathón	4–9–11	28:43	17 April 2011
Motagua	8–8–10	28:34	13 March 2011
Municipal Valencia	1–1–2	4:5	12 April 2006
Olimpia	3–8–13	13:41	7 March 2011
Platense	4–8–11	24:33	20 March 2011
Real España	5–5–14	24:36	26 March 2011
Vida	7–9–8	32:31	20 April 2011
Honduras / Honduras Progreso v
Opponent	Record	Goals	As of
Juticalpa	7–5–5	26:27	5 May 2019
Marathón	12–6–22	47:78	5 December 2020
Motagua	7–8–25	38:81	26 November 2020
Olimpia	6–6–25	36:87	29 November 2020
Parrillas One	2–1–1	9:8	4 April 2015
Platense	11–10–17	54:76	31 October 2020
Real de Minas	5–1–3	12:11	12 December 2020
Real España	9–9–21	46:70	28 October 2020
Real Sociedad	10–6–7	26:27	14 November 2020
Social Sol	3–1–0	5:2	12 April 2017
UPNFM	4–1–8	14:21	23 November 2020
Victoria	5–4–5	24:22	6 April 2016
Vida	13–11–15	52:61	25 October 2020
Honduras Salzburg v
Opponent	Record	Goals	As of
Marathón	2–1–1	3:3	9 April 2003
Motagua	0–0–4	4:9	10 May 2003
Olimpia	0–3–2	3:5	4 March 2003
Platense	0–3–1	5:6	29 April 2003
Real España	1–1–2	2:6	12 April 2003
Real Maya / Real Patepluma	1–2–1	3:3	4 April 2003
Universidad	0–3–1	3:5	14 March 2003
Victoria	0–2–2	3:6	28 March 2003
Vida	1–1–2	5:6	3 May 2003
Independiente Villela v
Opponent	Record	Goals	As of
Palestino	1–2–1	3:3	5 July 1998
Juticalpa v
Opponent	Record	Goals	As of
Marathón	4–3–9	21:27	30 March 2019
Motagua	2–5–11	21:39	21 April 2019
Olimpia	3–4–9	22:39	10 April 2019
Platense	8–5–3	27:16	15 April 2019
Real de Minas	2–2–1	11:11	12 May 2019
Real España	2–4–12	16:30	6 March 2019
Real Sociedad	4–2–6	11:13	25 March 2018
Social Sol	1–2–1	5:4	5 March 2017
UPNFM	1–2–5	10:17	10 March 2019
Victoria	3–1–0	8:3	1 May 2016
Vida	3–9–4	20:24	6 April 2019
Marathón v
Opponent	Record	Goals	As of
Motagua	69–69–87	269:293	3 January 2021
Municipal Valencia	4–0–4	9:8	29 April 2006
Necaxa	3–3–2	8:5	10 March 2012
Olimpia	66–67–116	224:328	17 January 2021
Palestino	3–0–1	13:6	2 September 1998
Parrillas One	3–4–1	11:10	25 April 2015
Platense	85–75–39	260:184	22 November 2020
Real Comayagua	3–1–0	7:3	13 April 2002
Real de Minas	6–0–2	14:7	12 November 2020
Real España	69–78–85	259:297	31 October 2020
Real Sociedad	10–10–11	40:35	28 November 2020
Social Sol	3–0–1	6:2	22 April 2017
UPNFM	8–5–0	28:14	25 November 2020
Victoria	69–54–37	224:150	23 April 2016
Vida	85–63–52	303:223	28 October 2020
Motagua v
Opponent	Record	Goals	As of
Municipal Valencia	2–5–1	6:6	7 May 2006
Necaxa	3–3–2	8:8	4 March 2012
Olimpia	57–103–95	210:276	10 January 2021
Palestino	3–1–0	10:5	13 August 1998
Parrillas One	3–3–2	12:12	21 March 2015
Platense	86–62–55	271:194	20 December 2020
Real Comayagua	2–1–1	5:3	20 April 2002
Real de Minas	4–4–2	20:12	21 November 2020
Real España	83–74–75	263:252	29 November 2020
Real Juventud	5–3–0	15:4	17 March 2010
Real Sociedad	13–9–9	50:42	28 October 2020
Social Sol	2–1–1	9:5	29 April 2017
UPNFM	11–3–1	27:9	6 December 2020
Victoria	62–56–44	229:185	19 March 2016
Vida	93–68–41	277:181	15 November 2020
Municipal Valencia v
Opponent	Record	Goals	As of
Olimpia	0–2–6	7:17	26 April 2006
Platense	4–0–4	7:7	19 April 2006
Real España	2–3–3	4:8	2 April 2006
Universidad / Broncos UNAH	4–3–1	8:3	23 April 2006
Victoria	1–3–4	6:8	8 April 2006
Vida	2–5–1	7:6	26 March 2006
Necaxa v
Opponent	Record	Goals	As of
Olimpia	2–4–4	4:11	22 April 2012
Platense	4–2–2	15:7	21 March 2012
Real España	2–3–3	10:13	1 April 2012
Victoria	1–2–5	11:16	14 April 2012
Vida	0–2–6	3:10	25 March 2012
Olimpia v
Opponent	Record	Goals	As of
Palestino	3–1–0	10:3	9 September 1998
Parrillas One	6–2–2	19:10	15 March 2015
Platense	96–77–34	288:167	15 November 2020
Real Comayagua	3–1–0	11:4	24 March 2002
Real de Minas	7–2–0	21:8	24 October 2020
Real España	96–99–55	292:208	6 December 2020
Real Sociedad	19–10–6	51:29	22 November 2020
Social Sol	4–0–0	9:4	19 March 2017
UPNFM	12–3–3	34:14	28 October 2020
Victoria	95–51–33	307:161	27 April 2016
Vida	105–76–27	332:170	3 January 2021
Palestino v
Opponent	Record	Goals	As of
Platense	0–2–2	5:9	9 August 1998
Real España	0–1–3	3:9	26 July 1998
Real Maya	1–1–2	5:8	2 August 1998
Universidad	2–1–1	7:5	12 July 1998
Victoria	0–2–2	4:7	30 August 1998
Vida	2–0–2	7:7	23 August 1998
Parrillas One v
Opponent	Record	Goals	As of
Platense	1–1–6	8:15	8 April 2015
Real España	2–2–4	16:23	15 April 2015
Real Sociedad	4–2–2	13:12	19 April 2015
Victoria	2–3–3	10:12	2 May 2015
Vida	4–1–3	12:11	12 April 2015
Platense v
Opponent	Record	Goals	As of
Real Comayagua	1–1–2	5:6	28 April 2002
Real de Minas	4–2–3	15:16	28 October 2020
Real España	58–69–73	232:271	25 October 2020
Real Sociedad	9–10–9	34:34	25 November 2020
Social Sol	3–1–0	5:1	10 March 2017
UPNFM	4–6–4	10:9	29 November 2020
Victoria	55–42–48	–:–	17 April 2016
Vida	62–63–58	210:203	6 December 2020
Real Comayagua v
Opponent	Record	Goals	As of
Real España	1–2–1	4:5	1 May 2002
Universidad	0–1–3	3:9	17 April 2002
Victoria	0–3–1	4:6	24 April 2002
Vida	1–2–1	6:6	7 April 2002
Real de Minas v
Opponent	Record	Goals	As of
Real España	1–2–6	6:19	25 November 2020
Real Sociedad	5–1–0	11:3	5 December 2020
UPNFM	2–4–4	9:12	31 October 2020
Vida	3–2–3	10:9	28 November 2020
Real España v
Opponent	Record	Goals	As of
Real Sociedad	14–10–14	51:55	12 December 2020
Social Sol	2–2–0	6:2	1 March 2017
UPNFM	3–5–7	22:21	14 November 2020
Victoria	64–53–41	213:165	2 April 2016
Vida	78–70–53	267:204	21 November 2020
Real Sociedad v
Opponent	Record	Goals	As of
Social Sol	0–4–0	5:5	9 April 2017
UPNFM	1–2–6	8:18	24 October 2020
Victoria	9–6–5	32:15	13 March 2016
Vida	13–8–8	40:32	1 November 2020
Social Sol v
Opponent	Record	Goals	As of
Vida	1–1–2	4:6	1 April 2017
UPNFM v
Opponent	Record	Goals	As of
Vida	4–8–4	21:22	23 December 2020
Victoria v
Opponent	Record	Goals	As of
Vida	47–56–47	160:150	9 April 2016

== Qualifications by team ==
- Updated 10 January 2021

Club	1/2	1/2	1/3	1/4 (S)	1/4 (C)	1/5	1/6	Playoffs
Olimpia	39	1	1	44	5	12	11	5
Motagua	24	1	2	29	4	10	11	7
Real España	21	0	4	26	4	10	8	11
Marathón	19	0	0	27	4	11	7	10
Platense	4	0	1	13	1	3	10	7
Real Sociedad	4	0	0	5	0	0	0	5
Victoria	3	0	3	14	1	4	9	3
Honduras Progreso	2	0	0	2	0	0	0	3
Vida	1	0	1	7	4	6	3	4
Universidad	1	0	0	2	1	2	3	0
Atlético Morazán	1	0	0	0	0	1	0	0
Broncos	0	0	0	1	0	3	1	0
UPNFM	0	0	0	1	0	1	0	4
Federal	0	0	0	1	0	0	1	0
Deportes Savio	0	0	0	1	0	0	0	3
Atlético Choloma	0	0	0	1	0	0	0	2
Municipal Valencia	0	0	0	1	0	0	0	0
Hispano	0	0	0	1	0	0	0	0
Sula	0	0	0	0	0	1	0	0
Petrotela	0	0	0	0	0	1	0	0
Real Maya	0	0	0	0	0	0	2	0
Juticalpa	0	0	0	0	0	0	0	2
Necaxa	0	0	0	0	0	0	0	1
Parrillas One	0	0	0	0	0	0	0	1

== Titles ==
DL = Domestic leagues
DC = Domestic cups
SC = Domestic Supercups
CA = Central American championships (includes Copa Fraternidad, Torneo Grandes de Centroamérica and/or UNCAF Interclub Cup)
CC = CONCACAF championships (includes CONCACAF Champions League, CONCACAF Cup Winners Cup, CONCACAF Giants Cup and/or CONCACAF League).

No.	Club	DL	DC	SC	CA	CC
1	Olimpia	32	3	3	2	3
2	Motagua	17	1	2	1	0
3	Real España	12	2	0	2	0
4	Marathón	9	2	1	0	0
5	Platense	2	3	0	0	0
6	Vida	2	0	0	0	0
7	Victoria	1	0	0	0	0
8	Honduras Progreso	1	0	0	0	0
9	Real Maya	0	1	0	0	0
10	Juticalpa	0	1	0	0	0
11	Broncos	0	0	0	1	0

== Regular season performance ==
- From 1965–66 to 2020–21 Clausura

Club	1st	2nd	3rd	4th	5th	6th	7th	8th	9th	10th	11th
Olimpia	43	13	13	6	1		1				
Motagua	10	23	8	12	8	5	4	2	4	1	
España / Real España	9	5	16	15	10	11	4	4	2	1	
Marathón	6	17	15	15	8	3	5	4	3	1	
Platense	3	4	5	5	13	18	8	8	8	3	1
Vida	2	4	8	7	8	4	15	13	11	5	
Victoria	1	6	5	6	6	9	8	8	5	6	
Real Sociedad	1	3			3	3	1		1	3	
Honduras / Honduras Progreso	1		1	2	1	3	2	2	2	4	
Atlético Morazán / Juventud Morazánica	1					1		1	2		
Universidad / Broncos UNAH		1	2	1	3	5	8	3	6	5	1
Tela Timsa / Petrotela		1						2	1	2	
UPNFM			1	2	2	1		1			
Broncos			1	1	2	4	1	2	3	2	
Hispano			1		3	1	3		1	3	
Municipal Valencia			1					2	1		
Deportes Savio				1	3	2	1	4	4	3	
Real Maya / Real Patepluma				1	1		2	1	4	2	
Atlético Choloma				1	1					2	
Troya				1		1				2	
Atlético Indio				1			2	2	1	2	
Juticalpa					2			3	3		
Sula / Juventud de Sula					1		1	3		2	
La Salle / San Pedro					1			1		1	
Necaxa						2		1	1		
Campamento / Atlético Olanchano						1	3	1	1	3	
Federal						1	1	1	1	2	
Real de Minas						1	1	1		2	
Parrillas One						1	1		2		
Atlético Español							1	1	1	2	
Real Juventud							1	1	1	1	
Súper Estrella							1		2	1	
Dandy							1			1	
E.A.C.I.							1			1	
Curacao								1		1	
Real Comayagua								1		1	
Honduras Salzburg								1		1	
Social Sol								1		1	
Verdún								1			
Independiente Villela									2	3	1
Lempira									2	1	
Deportes Progreseño									1	1	
Palestino									1	1	
Atlántida										1	
Tiburones										1	
Portuario										1	

== Top 10 attendances ==
Rank	Date	Teams involved	Attendance
1	17 December 2006	Olimpia v Motagua	38,256
2	26 August 2000	Motagua v Olimpia	37,371
3	1 June 2003	Marathón v Motagua	35,745
4	11 February 2001	Olimpia v Platense	35,067
5	21 December 2003	Olimpia v Real España	34,515
6	10 January 1990	Olimpia v Real España	34,252
7	15 December 2002	Platense v Olimpia	34,230
8	25 October 1998	Olimpia v Motagua	34,194
9	20 December 2014	Motagua v Real Sociedad	34,169
10	23 January 2000	Motagua v Olimpia	34,044

== Most active coaches ==
- Updated 17 January 2021

Manager	GD	Clubs
(Honduras) José Herrera	710	Motagua, Olimpia, Real España, Marathón, Platense, Universidad and Independiente Villela
(Argentina) Héctor Vargas (active)	604	Universidad, Vida, Victoria, Platense, Hispano, Olimpia and Marathón
(Honduras) Ramón Maradiaga	568	Motagua, Marathón, Real España, Victoria, Vida and Juticalpa
(Honduras) Carlos Padilla	512	Platense, Motagua, Olimpia, Atlético Morazán, Real España and Universidad
(Argentina) Roberto Scalessi	508	Real España, Marathón, Platense, Sula and Universidad
(Honduras) Edwin Pavón	451	Broncos, Olimpia, Motagua, Real España, Marathón, Atlético Choloma, Real Juventud and Atlético Olanchano
(Chile) Néstor Matamala	425	Motagua, Broncos, Real España, Olimpia, Marathón, Platense and Palestino
(Honduras) Carlos Martínez	401	Universidad, Deportes Savio, Atlético Olanchano, Real Sociedad, Platense, Vida, Victoria and Marathón
(Honduras) Hernán García	349	Marathón, Real España, Vida, Victoria, Platense, Deportes Savio and Honduras Progreso
(Honduras) Enrique Grey	328	Marathón, Real España, Olimpia, Platense, Vida and Victoria
(Brazil) Flavio Ortega	321	Real España, Marathón, Olimpia, Motagua and Platense
(Argentina) Diego Vásquez (active)	301	Motagua
(Honduras) Jorge Pineda	284	Victoria, Marathón, Vida, Hispano, Juticalpa and Motagua
(Uruguay) Julio González	265	Victoria, Petrotela, Olimpia and Motagua
(Honduras) Roberto González	250	Victoria, Vida and Sula
(Honduras) Rafael Núñez	225	Victoria, Vida, Platense and Hispano
