= Guillermo Ramírez (disambiguation) =

Guillermo Ramírez (Guillermo Ramírez Ortega, born 1978) is a former Guatemalan footballer.

Guillermo Ramírez may also refer to:

- Guillermo Ramírez Diez (born 1979), Chilean politician
- Guillermo Ramírez Hernández (1936–2023), Mexican economist and publisher, director of the Fondo de Cultura Económica in 1974–1976
- Guillermo Ramírez Sanz (1881–1950), Chilean industrialist and politician
