= Javier Portillo =

Javier Portillo may refer to:

- Javier Portillo (Honduran footballer) (born 1981), Honduran football left midfielder
- Javier Portillo (Spanish footballer) (born 1982), Spanish football forward
