= Marcelo Dos Santos =

Marcelo dos Santos or Marcelo Dos Santos may refer to:

- Marcelo dos Santos, mostly known as Marcelinho Paraíba (born 1975), Brazilian football player
- Marcelo dos Santos, mostly known as Marcelo Cabrita (born 1979), Brazilian football player
- Marcelo dos Santos (boccia) (born 1972), Brazilian Paralympic boccia player
- Marcelo Dos Santos (writer), Latinx British-Brazilian-Australian writer and playwright
