= Gastambide =

Gastambide is a surname and may refer to:

- Franck Gastambide (born 1978), French TV and film director
- Guillermo Díaz Gastambide (born 1979), Uruguayan footballer

== See also ==
- Gastambide-Mengin monoplane, an early French experimental aircraft designed by Léon Levavasseur
