= MLS Cup 2005 =

2005 edition of the MLS Cup

- Event: MLS Cup
New England Revolution	Los Angeles Galaxy
0	1
- After extra time
- Date: November 13, 2005
- Venue: Pizza Hut Park, Frisco, Texas, US
- MLS Cup MVP: Guillermo Ramírez (Los Angeles Galaxy)
- Referee: Kevin Stott
- Attendance: 21,193
- Weather: Sunny, 75 °F (24 °C)

MLS Cup 2005 was the 10th edition of the MLS Cup, the championship match of Major League Soccer (MLS). The soccer match took place on November 13, 2005, at Pizza Hut Park in Frisco, Texas, near Dallas, and was contested between the New England Revolution and the Los Angeles Galaxy. It was a rematch of MLS Cup 2002 and ended in a repeat victory for Los Angeles, who won 1–0 on a goal scored by Guillermo Ramírez in extra time.

New England qualified as the top seed in the Eastern Conference with several players named to the MLS Best XI, while Los Angeles was the lowest-seeded playoff team and had rebuilt its roster in the offseason. Ramírez, who was brought in on loan from CSD Municipal, had scored no goals from open play despite 62 shots but was substituted into the MLS Cup final and scored the winning goal.

== Venue ==
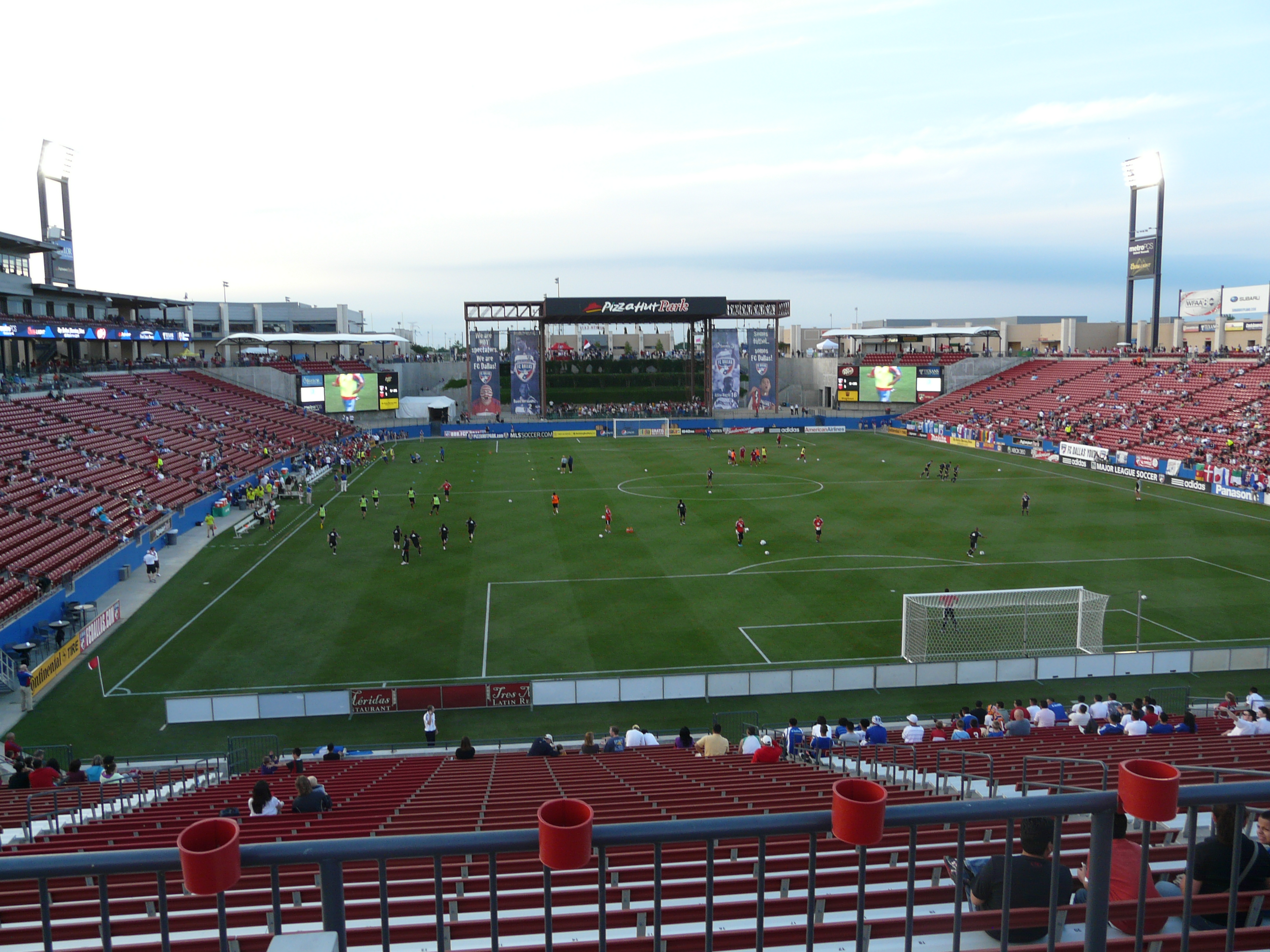
MLS Cup 2005 was hosted at Pizza Hut Park in Frisco, Texas, home to FC Dallas.

The match was hosted at Pizza Hut Park in Frisco, Texas, the newly built home of FC Dallas. The 21,000-seat stadium was announced as the host on November 12, 2004. It opened on August 6, 2005, and was the third major soccer-specific stadium to be built for an MLS team. The stadium cost $80 million to construct. The stadium sits at the center of a 145-acre (59 ha) complex with 17 soccer fields located near downtown Frisco, approximately 30 miles (48 km) north of Downtown Dallas. Prior to the match, the league hosted pre-game festivities at nearby venues and parking lots, including events with FC Dallas players. Pizza Hut Park (later renamed Toyota Stadium) would go on to host MLS Cup 2006, and the 2007 and 2016 finals of the U.S. Open Cup, which all featured the New England Revolution.

== Road to the final ==
The MLS Cup is the post-season championship of Major League Soccer (MLS), a professional club soccer league in the United States. The 2005 season was the tenth in league history, and was contested by twelve teams divided into two conferences. Each club played 32 matches during the regular season from April 2 to October 16, facing each team twice and in-conference teams two additional times. The playoffs, running from October 21 to November 13, were contested by the top four clubs in each conference. It was organized into three rounds: a home-and-away series in the Conference Semifinals, a single-match Conference Final, and the MLS Cup final.

The tenth MLS Cup was contested between the New England Revolution and Los Angeles Galaxy in a rematch of the 2002 final, which the Galaxy won 1–0. It was the second time that an MLS Cup final featured a previous matchup. New England finished the regular season atop the Eastern Conference, while Los Angeles was the lowest-ever seed to play in the MLS Cup final after finishing eighth overall. The Galaxy and Revolution played twice in the regular season and both matches ended in 1–1 draws.

=== New England Revolution ===
New England Revolution made it to two consecutive Eastern Conference finals in 2003 and 2004 under head coach Steve Nicol, who was promoted from his interim role during the run to the 2002 final. The club drafted several young midfielders and forwards during the two seasons, including Pat Noonan, Shalrie Joseph, and Clint Dempsey, who helped replace retiring players or injured starters. Dempsey was named Rookie of the Year for his performance in the 2004 season, scoring seven goals and finishing third on the team in scoring behind Noonan and Taylor Twellman. The Revolution finished tied with the Chicago Fire for the worst record in the league in 2004 and qualified for the playoffs on the last day of the regular season. The team then defeated the Supporters' Shield-winning Columbus Crew 2–1 on aggregate in the Conference Semifinals. They advanced to the Conference Final, drawing 3–3 with D.C. United after extra time and losing 4–3 in the resulting penalty shootout in the sudden death sixth round.

The Revolution opened the 2005 season with an eleven-match unbeaten streak, including six consecutive wins, that propelled them to first place in the Eastern Conference. The team, however, lost its place atop the conference to Chicago by July due to key players being released for national team callups. New England then regained its first-place spot, but lost several players in early August to injuries after playing five league and U.S. Open Cup matches in 15 days. The Revolution finished the regular season with only two losses in their last nine matches, completing their best-ever season record. New England finished second in Supporters' Shield standings behind San Jose, but set new team records for wins, with 17, and a conference record for points, with 59. Twellman's 17 goals earned him the MLS Golden Boot and the league's MVP award—a first for the Revolution. Defender Michael Parkhurst earned the Rookie of the Year Award, while Twellman, Dempsey, and Joseph were named to the MLS Best XI.

New England opened the playoffs in the Conference Semifinals against the New York/New Jersey MetroStars, who clinched the 4th-seed berth on the last day of the season, mirroring the Revolution's performance in 2004. The Revolution lost 1–0 in the first leg at Giants Stadium in New Jersey, but advanced on aggregate score after a 3–1 victory at home in Massachusetts with three second-half goals. In their fourth consecutive Eastern Conference final, New England faced the Chicago Fire at home and won 1–0 on a goal in the fourth minute by Clint Dempsey and a disallowed offside goal.

=== Los Angeles Galaxy ===
The Los Angeles Galaxy fired head coach Sigi Schmid midway through the 2004 season, only two years after leading them to their first cup title in 2002, despite the team's place at the top of the league. His replacement for the remaining eight matches, former national team head coach Steve Sampson, led the team into a second-place finish in the Western Conference with only two wins and seven goals scored. After defeating the Colorado Rapids in the Conference Semifinals, the Galaxy ended their season with a 2–0 loss to the first-place Kansas City Wizards in the Western Conference Final.

The Galaxy rebuilt their roster ahead of the 2005 season, retaining only 12 of 28 players from the playoff run, and traded away Carlos Ruiz to FC Dallas to sign returning American forward Landon Donovan. Los Angeles began the season with only two losses in their first eleven matches, but national team callups and injuries led to winless streaks in July and August. The Galaxy also participated in the U.S. Open Cup, which it won in September against FC Dallas. The team finished the regular season with a 13–13–6 record, clinching the fourth seed in the Western Conference.

In the Conference Semifinals, Los Angeles faced their in-state rivals and Supporters' Shield-winning San Jose Earthquakes, who had won in the two team's last playoff meeting 5–4 on aggregate in 2003. The Galaxy won the first leg 3–1 at their home, with two goals from Donovan against his former club, and drew the away leg 1–1 to advance 4–2 on aggregate. Donovan then scored twice in Los Angeles's 2–0 over the Colorado Rapids in the Western Conference Final, sending the Galaxy to their fifth MLS Cup appearance.

=== Summary of results ===
Note: In all results below, the score of the finalist is given first (H: home; A: away).

New England Revolution				Round	Los Angeles Galaxy			
1st place in Eastern Conference: Team / Pld / W / L / D / Pts; New England Revolution / 32 / 17 / 7 / 8 / 59; D.C. United / 32 / 16 / 10 / 6 / 54; Chicago Fire / 32 / 15 / 13 / 4 / 49; MetroStars / 32 / 12 / 9 / 11 / 47; Kansas City Wizards / 32 / 11 / 9 / 12 / 45; Columbus Crew / 32 / 11 / 16 / 5 / 38; Source: MLS Qualified for playoffs				Regular season	4th place in Western Conference: Team / Pld / W / L / D / Pts; San Jose Earthquakes (SS) / 32 / 18 / 4 / 10 / 64; FC Dallas / 32 / 13 / 10 / 9 / 48; Colorado Rapids / 32 / 13 / 13 / 6 / 45; Los Angeles Galaxy / 32 / 13 / 13 / 6 / 45; Real Salt Lake / 32 / 5 / 22 / 5 / 20; Chivas USA / 32 / 4 / 22 / 6 / 18; Source: MLS Qualified for playoffs Supporters' Shield winner			
Opponent	Agg.	1st leg	2nd leg	MLS Cup Playoffs	Opponent	Agg.	1st leg	2nd leg
MetroStars	3–2	0–1 (A)	3–1 (H)	Conference Semifinals	San Jose Earthquakes	4–2	1–3 (H)	1–1 (A)
Chicago Fire	1–0 (H)			Conference Final	Colorado Rapids	2–0 (A)		

== Broadcasting ==
The MLS Cup final was televised in the United States on ABC in English and Spanish using secondary audio programming. English play-by-play commentary was provided by JP Dellacamera with color analysis by Eric Wynalda, reprising their roles at MLS Cup 2004. Brandi Chastain provided sideline reporting, while Rob Stone anchored the pre-game and halftime shows. The Spanish language broadcast was provided by ESPN Deportes and included commentary from Randall Alvarez and Eduardo Biscayart. The match was also streamed via internet radio on MLSnet.com.

== Match ==
=== Summary ===
The match, referred by Kevin Stott, kicked off on a sunny day with temperatures of 75 °F (24 °C), at 12:30 p.m. Central Time. New England were named as the favorites heading into the MLS Cup, fielding an offensive lineup that was countered by Los Angeles's attacking midfielders. The Galaxy began the match with several attacks, including a lobbed shot into the goal in the sixth minute by forward Herculez Gomez that was ruled offside. Chris Albright and Landon Donovan combined for an attempt in the 19th minute that drifted across the box. The Revolution could not produce many attacks during the first half, with a lone shot near goal coming in the 29th minute on a missed header by Shalrie Joseph off a corner kick. The Galaxy had two more chances to take the lead during the first half, with Gomez missing a shot from 12 yards (11 m) in the 41st minute and Donovan's shot in stoppage time being saved by Revolution goalkeeper Matt Reis.

The Revolution began the second half with offensive pressure down the flanks, but failed to connect on crosses into the penalty area. New England's lone shot on goal during regulation time came from defender Jay Heaps in the 62nd minute, shooting into the hands of Los Angeles goalkeeper Kevin Hartman. The Revolution substituted Pat Noonan for midfielder José Cancela, moving into a 4–2–2 with Twellman and Dempsey as strikers; the Galaxy responded by bringing on midfielder Guillermo Ramírez for Ned Grabavoy in the 66th minute. The Galaxy had several chances to take a late lead, with a shot by Donovan in the 79th minute that was saved by Michael Parkhurst and an attempt by Gomez a minute later that passed over the goal. Cobi Jones took the final regulation-time shot on goal for the Galaxy in the 83rd minute, which hit the crossbar of the goal.

Cancela nearly gave New England a lead in the ninth minute of extra time, hitting a half-volley from 22 yards (20 m) that was deflected away from goal by Hartman. The Revolution pressed along the wings for another chance, including a cross by Albright that was headed wide by Donovan. The winning goal for the Galaxy was scored in the 17th minute of extra time by Ramírez, who received a deflection from Reis and volleyed it from outside the penalty area. After the overtime's short halftime, the Revolution missed several shots on goal while looking for an equalizing goal, but left themselves open to counterattacks by the Galaxy. Two shots from Donovan and Gomez were saved from close range by Reis in the 25th minute of extra time, shortly before Cancela's shot was deflected away from goal by defender Ugo Ihemelu in stoppage time. Los Angeles won their second MLS Cup title, with the same scoreline and scoreless regulation as their previous victory over New England in 2002.

=== Details ===
November 13, 2005
12:30 p.m.

New England Revolution	0–1 (a.e.t.)	Los Angeles Galaxy
	Report	Ramírez 107'

Pizza Hut Park, Frisco, Texas
Attendance: 21,193
Referee: Kevin Stott

New England Revolution	Los Angeles Galaxy

GK	1	(United States) Matt Reis
DF	6	(United States) Jay Heaps	(yellow card) 76'
DF	15	(United States) Michael Parkhurst
DF	8	(United States) Joe Franchino (c)	(yellow card) 22'
DF	16	(United States) James Riley	(yellow card) 54'	(substituted off) 107'
MF	2	(United States) Clint Dempsey
MF	3	(United States) Daniel Hernández	(yellow card) 15'	(substituted off) 90+1'
MF	21	(Grenada) Shalrie Joseph	(yellow card) 37'
MF	14	(United States) Steve Ralston
FW	20	(United States) Taylor Twellman
FW	11	(United States) Pat Noonan		(substituted off) 64'
Substitutes:
GK	12	(United States) Doug Warren
DF	19	(New Zealand) Tony Lochhead
DF	31	(United States) Jeff Larentowicz
MF	7	(Uruguay) José Cancela		(substituted on) 64'
MF	18	(Panama) Ricardo Phillips
MF	23	(United States) Luke Vercollone
MF	25	(Wales) Andy Dorman		(substituted on) 90+1'
FW	17	(Nigeria) Connally Edozien
FW	30	(United States) Ryan Latham		(substituted on) 107'
Manager:
(Scotland) Steve Nicol

GK	22	(United States) Kevin Hartman
DF	5	(United States) Chris Albright	(yellow card) 81'
DF	15	(United States) Ugo Ihemelu
DF	14	(Jamaica) Tyrone Marshall	(yellow card) 69'
DF	2	(United States) Todd Dunivant	(yellow card) 33'
MF	13	(United States) Cobi Jones		(substituted off) 109'
MF	28	(Brazil) Paulo Nagamura	(yellow card) 56'
MF	8	(United States) Peter Vagenas (c)
MF	11	(United States) Ned Grabavoy		(substituted off) 66'
FW	10	(United States) Landon Donovan
FW	16	(United States) Herculez Gomez	(yellow card) 78'	(substituted off) 119'
Substitutes:
GK	1	(United States) Steve Cronin
GK	35	(Puerto Rico) Josh Saunders
DF	12	(United States) Troy Roberts
DF	27	(Costa Rica) Pablo Chinchilla
MF	19	(United States) Michael Enfield
MF	17	(Guatemala) Guillermo Ramírez		(substituted on) 66'
MF	99	(Brazil) Marcelo Saragosa
FW	29	(Brazil) Ednaldo da Conceição		(substituted on) 109'
FW	21	(United States) Alan Gordon		(substituted on) 119'
Manager:
(United States) Steve Sampson

MLS Cup Most Valuable Player:
(Guatemala) Guillermo Ramírez (Los Angeles Galaxy)

Assistant referees:
Chris Strickland
Greg Barkey
Fourth official:
Ricardo Valenzuela

== Post-match ==
The Los Angeles Galaxy became the third team in MLS history to win both an MLS Cup and the U.S. Open Cup in the same season, following D.C. United in 1996 and the Chicago Fire in 1998. Guillermo Ramírez was named the MLS Cup MVP for his performance, which contrasted with his struggles to score during the regular season. He attempted 62 shots from open play and was unable to convert. The Galaxy declined to continue his loan and Ramírez returned the following season to CSD Municipal in Guatemala. The match featured 10 yellow cards, doubling the previous MLS Cup record set in 2001, was the third to be decided by a single goal, and the second to be scoreless before overtime after the 2002 final. The match's attendance of 21,193 was a sellout crowd, and included hundreds of traveling supporters from New England and 100 employees brought by Revolution owner Robert Kraft, but remains the lowest for an MLS Cup final.

Both finalists qualified for the quarterfinals of the 2006 CONCACAF Champions' Cup, played during the following preseason against Costa Rican teams. The Galaxy lost 3–2 to Deportivo Saprissa, while the Revolution fell 1–0 to Alajuelense. The Revolution were also finalists in the next two MLS Cups, losing both to the Houston Dynamo (formed from the San Jose Earthquakes) on penalty kicks at Pizza Hut Park in 2006 and in regulation time at RFK Memorial Stadium in Washington, D.C. in 2007. Los Angeles and New England would meet again in the 2014 final, which marked the Galaxy's fifth title and the Revolution's fifth loss.
