= Carlos Alvarado (footballer, born 1949) =

Honduran footballer

Personal information
- Full name: Carlos Humberto Alvarado Osorto
- Date of birth: 12 May 1949
- Place of birth: Langue, Honduras
- Date of death: 16 February 2016 (aged 66)
- Place of death: Tegucigalpa, Honduras
- Position: Forward

Senior career*
Years	Team	Apps	(Gls)
	Vida		(76)
	Olimpia		(3)

International career
- Honduras
- * Club domestic league appearances and goals

Carlos Alvarado (12 May 1949 – 16 February 2016) was a Honduran footballer who played as a striker. Alvarado is often considered by many the greatest C.D.S. Vida footballer of all times.

== Club career ==
Alvarado is C.D.S. Vida's all-time top scorer with 76 goals. He made his professional debut on 15 May 1968 in the 1–4 defeat against C.D. Victoria where he scored the sole Vida's goal. He has the shared record of scoring five goals in a single game against C.D. Troya in 1967. In 1972, he became the first Liga Nacional player to win the top-scorer award twice. Alvarado also played for Club Deportivo Olimpia before retiring.

== Personal life ==
Alvarado was born in Langue and raised in Nacaome. In 2012, he had a heart attack from which he recovered. He died on 16 February 2016 of a stroke, aged 66.
