= Eugenio Klein =

Argentine footballer

Personal information
- Date of birth: January 17, 1982 (age 44)
- Place of birth: Mar del Plata, Argentina
- Height: 5 ft 9 in (1.75 m)
- Positions: Attacking midfielder; forward

Team information
- Current team: Mar del Plata Athletics
- Number: 9

Youth career
- 1999–2001: Ferro

Senior career*
Years	Team	Apps	(Gls)
2001–2003	Ferro	?	(?)
2003–2004	River Plate	?	(?)
2004–2005	Defensores de Belgrano	?	(?)
2005–2006	Ferro	?	(?)
2006–2007	Talleres de Córdoba	?	(?)
2007–2008	Guaraní Antonio Franco	?	(?)
2008–2009	Alvarado	?	(?)
2009–2010	Motagua	?	(0)
2010–2011	Persib Bandung, Indonesia	?	(?)
2011–2012	Mar del Plata Athletics	?	(?)
- * Club domestic league appearances and goals as of January 1, 2016 ‡ National team caps and goals as of January 1, 2016

Eugenio Klein (born January 17, 1982) is an Argentine soccer player who last played for Mar del Plata Athletics. Klein plays primarily as an attacking midfielder, but he is also used as a winger or forward.
