= Mario Gómez (footballer, born August 1981) =

Honduran footballer

Personal information
- Full name: Mario Arnaldo Gómez Castellanos
- Date of birth: 12 August 1981 (age 45)
- Place of birth: Tela, Honduras
- Position: Midfielder

Youth career
- 2000–2001: NJCU Gothic Knights

Senior career*
Years	Team	Apps	(Gls)
2002	New Jersey Stallions	16	(3)
2002–2007	Vida		
2007–2009	Victoria	52	(2)
2009–2010	Motagua	11	(0)

International career
2005–2006	Honduras	2	(0)
Medal record
Representing Motagua
Silver medal – second place	Liga Nacional	2009–10 C
- * Club domestic league appearances and goals as of 17 April 2010

Mario Arnaldo Gómez Castellanos (born 12 August 1981) is a Honduran footballer.

== Club career ==
Gómez played for New Jersey Stallions, Vida and Victoria, before joining F.C. Motagua in summer 2009.

He most recently played for Vida in the Honduran football league. He won a sub-championship with F.C. Motagua but could not stay more than a year due to inconsistency and lack of appearances.

== International career ==
Gómez made his debut for Honduras in a March 2005 friendly match against the United States, coming on as a second-half substitute for Carlos Morán. His second and final international match was a February 2006 friendly against China.
