= Shannon Welcome =

Honduran footballer (born 1988)

Personal information
- Full name: Shannon Roy Welcome Warren
- Date of birth: 22 November 1988 (age 37)
- Place of birth: Roatán, Honduras
- Height: 1.93 m (6 ft 4 in)
- Position: Forward

Team information
- Current team: Aiginiakos

Youth career
- 2008: Arsenal

Senior career*
Years	Team	Apps	(Gls)
2008–2014	Motagua	49	(10)
2011	→ Heredia (loan)		
2011–2012	→ Necaxa (loan)		
2012–2013	→ Vida (loan)		
2013–2014	Acharnaikos	25	(3)
2014–2015	Chania	3	(0)
2015–	Aiginiakos	2	(4)
Medal record
Representing Motagua
Silver medal – second place	Liga Nacional	2009–10 C
- * Club domestic league appearances and goals as of 28 December 2010

Shannon Roy Welcome Warren (born 22 November 1988) is a Honduran football player.

== Club career ==
Welcome started his career at Arsenal in his native Roatán, then played for F.C. Motagua before moving abroad to play on loan for Guatemalan outfit Heredia. He was dismissed by Motagua in December 2011 when he failed to turn up for training sessions. In 2011, he joined Necaxa but was suspended by the club for indiscipline in March 2012. In the summer of 2012, he was loaned to Vida.

In 2013, he left Honduras to play in Greece.

=== Domestic goals summary ===
#	Date	Season	Playing for	Opponent	Final score
1	2008-07-31	2008–09 A	Motagua	Hispano	2 – 1 W
2	2009-02-26	2008–09 C	Motagua	Platense	3 – 4 L
3	2009-03-01	2008–09 C	Motagua	Victoria	1 – 1 D
4	2009-07-19	2009–10 A	Motagua	Real Juventud	2 – 0 W
5	2009-09-13	2009–10 A	Motagua	Real Juventud	3 – 0 W
6	2009-09-20	2009–10 A	Motagua	Deportes Savio	2 – 0 W
7	2010-02-03	2009–10 C	Motagua	Real Juventud	3 – 1 W
8	2010-03-11	2009–10 C	Motagua	Deportes Savio	1 – 1 D
9	2010-09-11	2010–11 A	Motagua	Vida	2 – 2 D
10	2010-11-07	2010–11 A	Motagua	Real España	1 – 1 D

== Personal life ==
He is a cousin of Honduras international striker Georgie Welcome.
