= Ney Costa =

Brazilian association footballer

Alberto Ney Costa de Jesús (born 20 November 1980) is a Brazilian former footballer who last played as a striker for Deportes Savio.

== Early life ==
Costa was born in 1980 in Brazil to a state official mother and a policer officer father and has a sister and two brothers.

== Career ==
Costa was regarded as one of the most prolific strikers in Honduras. In 2007, he signed for Honduran sideDeportes Savio, where he as regarded as an important player for the club. In 2012, he signed for Honduran side Vida, where he was regarded as unable to establish himself in the club and receive consistent playing time.

== Style of play ==
Costa mainly operated as a striker and was known for his chubby appearance during games.

== Post-playing career ==
After retiring from professional football, Costa worked in the coffee industry.

== Personal life ==
Costa was married and had twin children who died at an early age. He can speak Spanish and Portuguese.
