= Mauricio Weber =

Uruguayan footballer (born 1982)

Personal information
- Full name: Mauricio Enrique Weber Texeira
- Date of birth: 26 October 1982 (age 44)
- Place of birth: Montevideo, Uruguay
- Height: 1.70 m (5 ft 7 in)
- Position: Midfielder

Team information
- Current team: Motagua
- Number: 6

Senior career*
Years	Team	Apps	(Gls)
2000–2004	Rentistas	–	(–)
2005–2005	Rampla Juniors	–	(–)
2005–2006	Instituto	5	(0)
2006–2007	Santiago Morning	–	(–)
2007–2009	Victoria	7	(1)
2009–2010	Motagua	39	(3)
- * Club domestic league appearances and goals as of 19 October 2010

Mauricio Weber (born 26 October 1982) is a Uruguayan football player that currently plays for F.C. Motagua in Liga Nacional de Fútbol de Honduras. He previously played for C.A. Rentistas, Rampla Juniors, Instituto de Córdoba, Santiago Morning and C.D. Victoria.
