= Guillermo Ramírez =

Guatemalan footballer

Personal information
- Full name: Guillermo Ramírez Ortega
- Date of birth: 26 March 1978 (age 48)
- Place of birth: Livingston, Guatemala
- Height: 1.82 m (6 ft 0 in)
- Position: Midfielder

Youth career
- 1995–1997: Municipal

Senior career*
| Years | Team | Apps | (Gls) |
| 1996–2001 | Municipal | 172 | (52) |
| 2001 | PAS Giannina | 9 | (0) |
| 2001–2002 | Atlante | 10 | (0) |
| 2002–2003 | Chiapas | 14 | (2) |
| 2003–2009 | Municipal | 140 | (42) |
| 2005 | → Los Angeles Galaxy (loan) | 24 | (1) |
| 2009–2010 | Marathón | 28 | (6) |
| 2010–2011 | Municipal | 20 | (15) |
| 2011 | Motagua | 24 | (3) |
| 2012 | Heredia | 16 | (2) |
| Total | | 457 | (123) |

International career
| 1997–2012 | Guatemala | 106 | (16) |
- * Club domestic league appearances and goals

Guillermo "El Pando" Ramírez Ortega (born 26 March 1978) is a Guatemalan former footballer who played as a midfielder and was also the captain of the Guatemala national team.

Ramírez started his career with Municipal and later played in Greece, Mexico and the MLS in USA. In 2012 he was suspended for life from any soccer related activities due to his participation in money laundering and fixing games along with fellow national team members Yony Flores and Gustavo Cabrera.

== Club career ==
Ramírez was born in Livingston, Guatemala.

=== Municipal ===
Ramírez played 333 league games for Municipal in three spells scoring 109 goals.

=== Los Angeles Galaxy ===
He played the 2005 season on loan for the Los Angeles Galaxy of Major League Soccer. He struggled, scoring just one goal during the regular season, but in the playoffs, in his only appearance as a substitute in the MLS Cup Final, he scored the game-winner in extra time to give Galaxy its second MLS title. This feat was in high contrast with his poor scoring percentage in the MLS regular season, with 62 shots and 1 goal, which incidentally came from a penalty.

Ramírez is perhaps the most unlikely MLS Cup MVP in league history; he was widely lampooned for his poor shooting and during the 2005 campaign failed to connect on any of his 62 attempts during open play – his only goal came via a penalty. Relegated to the bench, Ramírez entered the scoreless Cup final between the LA Galaxy and the New England Revolution in 66th minute. In the 107th, with penalties looming, the Guatemalan hit a stunning volley from just outside the penalty area to lift the Galaxy to their second league title.

Ramírez was gone the following season and went on to play in Guatemala and Honduras.

After the 2005 MLS season, Ramírez went back to Municipal, where he remained until 2009, helping the team win four league championships during that period. He then joined C.D. Marathón in the Honduran 2009–2010 league season and had a respectable tournament; he scored in the final to earn the league championship. The following year, he rejoined Municipal, but then in January 2011 he signed a 6-month contract with F.C. Motagua where head coach Ramón Maradiaga wanted him because of the type of player he was under his tenure managing the Guatemala national team. He appeared in the 2011–12 CONCACAF Champions League preliminary round, scoring the last goal of a 4–0 win for Motagua against his former club Municipal.

=== Match fixing allegations and suspension ===
Ramírez, 34, along with one-time Real Salt Lake defender Gustavo Cabrera and Yony Flores, also a defender, were found guilty by the National Football Federation of Guatemala in September of conspiring to fix a pair of national team exhibitions and a CONCACAF Champions League game between CSD Municipal and Mexico's Santos Laguna.

The trio played together at Municipal in the fall of 2010, when the club finished behind Santos and the Columbus Crew in its first-round group.

Banned from the sport inside their native country in September 2012, the players saw their exile extended worldwide the following month.

== International career ==
Ramírez made his debut for Guatemala in an April 1997 UNCAF Cup match against Costa Rica and has earned 103 caps since. He has been part of the qualification processes for the World Cups of 2002, 2006, 2010, and 2014. He captained the squad that reached the final stage of the 2006 World Cup qualification. On 27 May 2012, Ramirez was separated from the Guatemala National Team on basis of suspected "to arrange a match's result of Guatemala against South Africa in 2010." In June 2012, this was confirmed by teammates, Luis Rodriguez and Carlos Ruiz. Currently Ramirez is under FIFA investigation as well as by the Ministerio Publico of Guatemala for treason, money laundering and the investigations are still being made.

List of international goals scored by Guillermo Ramírez
| No. | Date | Venue | Opponent | Score | Result | Competition | Ref. |
|---|---|---|---|---|---|---|---|
| 1 | 23 January 1998 | Estadio Doroteo Guamuch Flores, Guatemala City, Guatemala | Trinidad and Tobago | 3–1 | 3–1 | Friendly | |
| 2 | 23 February 2000 | Los Angeles Memorial Coliseum, Los Angeles, United States | Trinidad and Tobago | 2–2 | 2–4 | 2000 Gold Cup | |
| 3 | 11 June 2000 | Antigua Recreation Ground, Saint John Parish, Antigua and Barbuda | Antigua and Barbuda | 1–0 | 1–0 | 2002 FIFA World Cup qualification | |
| 4 | 18 June 2000 | Estadio Doroteo Guamuch Flores, Guatemala City, Guatemala | Antigua and Barbuda | 3–0 | 8–1 | 2002 FIFA World Cup qualification | |
| 5 | 23 February 2003 | Estadio Rommel Fernández, Panama City, Panama | Honduras | 1–0 | 2–1 | 2003 UNCAF Nations Cup | |
| 6 | 12 June 2004 | Paramaribo, Suriname | Suriname | 1–1 | 1–1 | 2006 FIFA World Cup qualification | |
| 7 | 23 July 2004 | Estadio Rommel Fernández, Panama City, Panama | Panama | 1–0 | 1–1 | 2006 FIFA World Cup qualification | |
| 8 | 6 August 2004 | Robert F. Kennedy Memorial Stadium, Washington D.C, United States | El Salvador | 1–0 | 2–0 | Friendly | |
| 9 | 11 August 2004 | Estadio Doroteo Guamuch Flores, Guatemala City, Guatemala | Trinidad and Tobago | 2–0 | 4–1 | Friendly | |
| 10 | 26 March 2005 | Estadio Doroteo Guamuch Flores, Guatemala City, Guatemala | Trinidad and Tobago | 1–0 | 5–1 | 2006 FIFA World Cup qualification | |
| 11 | 6 August 2008 | Robert F. Kennedy Memorial Stadium, Washington D.C, United States | Bolivia | 2–0 | 3–0 | Friendly | |
| 12 | 17 November 2010 | Fifth Third Bank Stadium, Kennesaw, United States | Guyana | 2–0 | 3–0 | Friendly | |
| 13 | 17 November 2010 | Fifth Third Bank Stadium, Kennesaw, United States | Guyana | 3–0 | 3–0 | Friendly | |
| 14 | 18 January 2011 | Estadio Rommel Fernández, Panama City, Panama | Honduras | 1–1 | 1–3 | 2011 UNCAF Nations Cup | |
| 15 | 15 November 2011 | Saint George, Grenada | Grenada | 3–1 | 4–1 | 2014 FIFA World Cup Qualification | |
| 16 | 29 February 2012 | Providence Stadium, Georgetown, Guyana | Guyana | 2–0 | 2–0 | Friendly | |

== Honours ==
Municipal

- Liga Nacional de Guatemala: Apertura 2000, Apertura 2004, Clausura 2005, Apertura 2005, Clausura 2006, Apertura 2006, Clausura 2008, Apertura 2009

Los Angeles Galaxy

- MLS Cup: 2005

Marathón

- Honduran Liga Nacional: 2009–10 Apertura

Motagua

- Honduran Liga Nacional: 2010–11 Clausura

Individual

- MLS Cup MVP: 2005

== See also ==
- List of men's footballers with 100 or more international caps
