= Charles Córdoba =

Colombian footballer (born 1982)

Personal information
- Full name: Charles Córdoba Sánchez
- Date of birth: 15 September 1982 (age 44)
- Place of birth: Carepa, Colombia
- Height: 1.80 m (5 ft 11 in)
- Position: Forward

Team information
- Current team: Xelajú

Senior career*
Years	Team	Apps	(Gls)
2004–2007	Deportivo Pereira		
2008–2009	Real Juventud		(5)
2009–2010	Vida		(14)
2010–2011	Motagua	7	(1)
2011	Necaxa		(5)
2011–2012	Vida	13	(14)
2012	Choloma	21	(3)
2012–2013	Heredia	34	(16)
2013–2014	Parrillas One	17	(9)
2014–2015	Xelajú	6	(4)
2015	Marathón	16	(7)
2015–2016	Parrillas One	14	(5)
2016	Marathón	18	(6)
2017	Juticalpa	10	(2)
- * Club domestic league appearances and goals

Charles Córdoba Sánchez (born 15 September 1982) is a Colombian footballer who plays as forward for Xelajú in the Liga Nacional de Guatemala.

== Career ==
=== Motagua ===
On 12 May 2010, Córdoba reached an agreement with F.C. Motagua, signing a two-year contract.

On 27 July, he made his first appearance for the club in the 1st leg of the CONCACAF Champions League preliminary round in a 1–0 defeat against Toronto, in which they were eliminated in the 2nd leg with a 2–2 tied. He then made his domestic league debut against Necaxa with a 3–0 on 7 August 2010. Córdoba scored his first goal for F.C. Motagua on 29 September 2010 in a Liga Nacional de Honduras match against Platense, scoring the only goal in a 1–0 victory.

Córdoba played with F.C. Motagua for a half season before leaving for Necaxa with only 7 appearances in the Torneo Apertura.

=== Necaxa ===
On 16 January 2011, Córdoba made his official debut with Necaxa in the Liga Nacional de Honduras against F.C. Motagua in the Estadio Tiburcio Carías Andino, where he scored his first goal in the 30th minute in a 1–1 draw against his previous team. He joined Choloma in summer 2012.

== Career statistics ==
Club	Season	League		Cup		Continental		Total	
Club	Season	Apps	Goals	Apps	Goals	Apps	Goals	Apps	Goals
Motagua	2010–11 A	7	1	—		2	0	9	1
Motagua	Total	7	1	—		2	0	9	1
Necaxa	2010–11 C	2	2	—		—		2	2
Necaxa	Total	2	2	—		—		2	2
