= Harrison Róchez =

Belizean footballer (born 1983)

Personal information
- Full name: Harrison Dwith Róchez
- Date of birth: 29 November 1983 (age 42)
- Place of birth: Stan Creek, Belize
- Position: Midfielder

Senior career*
| Years | Team | Apps | (Gls) |
| 2003–2004 | Acros Brown Bombers | | |
| 2004–2005 | Boca (Belize) | | |
| 2005–2006 | New Site Erei | | |
| 2006 | Valley Pride | | |
| 2007 | Wagiya | | |
| 2007–2009 | Deportes Savio | 48 | (5) |
| 2009–2010 | Platense (Honduras) | 18 | (7) |
| 2011 | Necaxa | | |
| 2012–2013 | Marathón | | |
| 2013–2019 | Police United FC (Belize) | | |

International career^{‡}
| 2004–2019 | Belize | 39 | (5) |
- * Club domestic league appearances and goals as of June 11, 2010 ‡ National team caps and goals as of January 30, 2017

Harrison Dwith Róchez (born November 29, 1983) is a Belizean former football midfielder.

== Club career ==
Róchez played for several local clubs in his native Belize, before moving to play in Honduras in 2007. He played for Platense and Necaxa before joining Marathón in December 2011.

== International career ==
He made his debut for Belize in a June 2004 World Cup qualification match against Canada and, by January 2010, has earned 14 caps, playing in four World Cup qualifiers.

=== International goals ===
Scores and results list Belize's goal tally first.

| # | Date | Venue | Opponent | Score | Result | Competition |
|---|---|---|---|---|---|---|
| 1. | 6 February 2008 | Estadio Mateo Flores, Guatemala City, Guatemala | Saint Kitts and Nevis | 2–1 | 3–1 | 2010 FIFA World Cup qualification |
| 2. | 9 October 2010 | Estadio Julián Tesucún, San José, Guatemala | Guatemala | 1–1 | 2–4 | Friendly |
| 3. | 15 June 2011 | Ato Boldon Stadium, Couva, Trinidad and Tobago | Montserrat | 2–1 | 5–2 | 2014 FIFA World Cup qualification |
| 4. | 2 September 2011 | National Stadium, St. Georges, Grenada | Grenada | 2–0 | 3–0 | 2014 FIFA World Cup qualification |
| 5. | 14 June 2015 | FFB Stadium, Belmopan, Belize | Dominican Republic | 1–0 | 3–0 | 2018 FIFA World Cup qualification |

== Stats ==
| Team | Season | Games | Start | Sub | Goal | YC | RC |
|---|---|---|---|---|---|---|---|
| Deportes Savio | 2007–08 C | 17 | 13 | 4 | 2 | 0 | 0 |
| Deportes Savio | 2008–09 A | 16 | 9 | 7 | 1 | 1 | 0 |
| Deportes Savio | 2008–09 C | 15 | 15 | 0 | 2 | 0 | 0 |
| C.D. Platense | 2009–10 A | 18 | 15 | 3 | 7 | 2 | 0 |
