= Guillermo Díaz (footballer, born 1979) =

Uruguayan footballer

Personal information
- Full name: Guillermo Díaz Gastambide
- Date of birth: 31 December 1979 (age 46)
- Place of birth: Montevideo, Uruguay
- Height: 1.80 m (5 ft 11 in)
- Position: Defender

Senior career*
Years	Team	Apps	(Gls)
1999–2000	Rentistas	–	(3)
2003–2004	Peñarol	–	(0)
2005–2008	Juventud de Las Piedras	–	(1)
2008–2010	Motagua	78	(3)
2011	Melgar	20	(0)
2012–2013	El Tanque Sisley	35	(0)
Medal record
Representing Motagua
Silver medal – second place	LINA	2009–10 C
- * Club domestic league appearances and goals as of 10 January 2014

Guillermo Díaz Gastambide (born 31 December 1979 in Montevideo) is a Uruguayan football who played as a defender.
