= Sergio Mendoza =

Honduran football defender (born 1981)

Personal information
- Full name: Sergio Giovany Mendoza Escobar
- Date of birth: 23 May 1981 (age 45)
- Place of birth: El Progreso, Honduras
- Height: 1.78 m (5 ft 10 in)
- Position: Defender

Senior career*
Years	Team	Apps	(Gls)
2002–2006	Real España		
2006–2009	Olimpia		
2009–2012	Motagua	79	(4)
2012–2017	USAC		

International career^{‡}
2002–2010	Honduras	53	(1)
Medal record
Honduras
Second place	UNCAF Nations Cup	2005
- * Club domestic league appearances and goals as of 5 May 2012 ‡ National team caps and goals as of 9 October 2010

Sergio Giovany Mendoza Escobar (born 23 May 1981) is a Honduran former footballer who played as a defender.

== Club career ==
Mendoza started his professional career at Real España and joined Olimpia in 2006.

=== Doping suspension and return ===
In January 2009 he was suspended for a year by FIFA for using a banned substance. On his return Olimpia claimed him to be theirs because he did not fulfill his contract due to his suspension but he signed for Motagua in October 2009 and he played there for 2 years until his recession on 12 May 2012.

He joined compatriots Gilberto Yearwood and Milton Núñez in summer 2012 at newly promoted Guatemalan side USAC.

== International career ==
Mendoza made his debut for Honduras in a March 2002 friendly match against the USA and has earned a total of 53 caps, scoring 1 goal. He has represented his country in 11 FIFA World Cup qualification matches and played 2 games at the 2010 FIFA World Cup in South Africa. He also played at the 2003, 2005 and 2007 UNCAF Nations Cups as well as at the 2007 CONCACAF Gold Cup.

His final international was an October 2010 friendly match against New Zealand.

=== International goals ===
Goal	Date	Venue	Opponent	Score	Result	Competition	N.	Date	Venue	Opponent	Score	Result	Competition
1.	May 29, 2008	Lockhart Stadium, Fort Lauderdale, United States	Venezuela	1-0	1-1	1–1	Friendly						

== See also ==
- List of sportspeople sanctioned for doping offences
