= Andrés Copete =

Colombian footballer (born 1983)

Mauricio Copete
Personal information
- Full name: Andrés Mauricio Copete Ceballos
- Date of birth: 29 October 1983 (age 42)
- Place of birth: Obando, Colombia
- Position: Forward

Team information
- Current team: Parrillas One

Senior career*
Years	Team	Apps	(Gls)
2008–2010	Victoria	49	(28)
2010	Olimpia	?	(4)
2011	Motagua	12	(1)
2011–2012	Victoria	22+	(19)
2013	Xelajú	15	(1)
2013	Llaneros	0	(0)
2014–	Parrillas One	2	(1)
- * Club domestic league appearances and goals as of 24 June 2011

Andrés Mauricio Copete Ceballos (born October 29, 1983) is a Colombian footballer who plays for Parrillas One.

== Club career ==
He made his debut in Honduras for Victoria against Deportes Savio on 2 August 2008, scoring the winning goal.
