= Sergio Diduch =

Argentine footballer (born 1976)

Personal information
- Full name: Sergio Raúl Diduch
- Date of birth: 23 October 1976 (age 50)
- Place of birth: Villa Ángela, Chaco, Argentina
- Position: Forward

Team information
- Current team: Hispano

Senior career*
Years	Team	Apps	(Gls)
2005–2006	Real España	39	(8)
2006–2009	Hispano	83	(30)
2009–2010	Motagua	38	(9)
2011 – present	Hispano	1	(1)
- * Club domestic league appearances and goals as of 12 February 2011

Sergio Diduch is an Argentine association football player who currently plays for Hispano F.C. in the Honduran top division.

He started his career in Honduras playing for Real España in 2005.

== Honours ==
- Individual:

Top goal scorer in 2008–09 Clausura
