= Marcelo Cabrita =

Brazilian footballer

Personal information
- Full name: Marcelo dos Santos
- Date of birth: 17 March 1979 (age 47)
- Place of birth: Ji-Paraná, Brazil
- Height: 1.66 m (5 ft 5 in)
- Position: Forward

Senior career*
| Years | Team | Apps | (Gls) |
| 2007 | Jaruense | | (16) |
| 2007–2009 | Platense | | (24) |
| 2009–2010 | Motagua | 37 | (10) |
| 2011 | Malacateco | | (6) |
| 2014 | Malacateco | 5 | (0) |
Medal record
Representing Motagua
| Silver medal – second place | Liga Nacional | 2009–10 C |
- * Club domestic league appearances and goals

Marcelo dos Santos (born 17 March 1979), mostly known as Marcelo Cabrita, is a Brazilian former professional footballer who played as a forward.

He played for Jaruense, Platense and Motagua in the Honduran Liga Nacional.
