= Javier Portillo (Honduran footballer) =

Honduran footballer (born 1981)

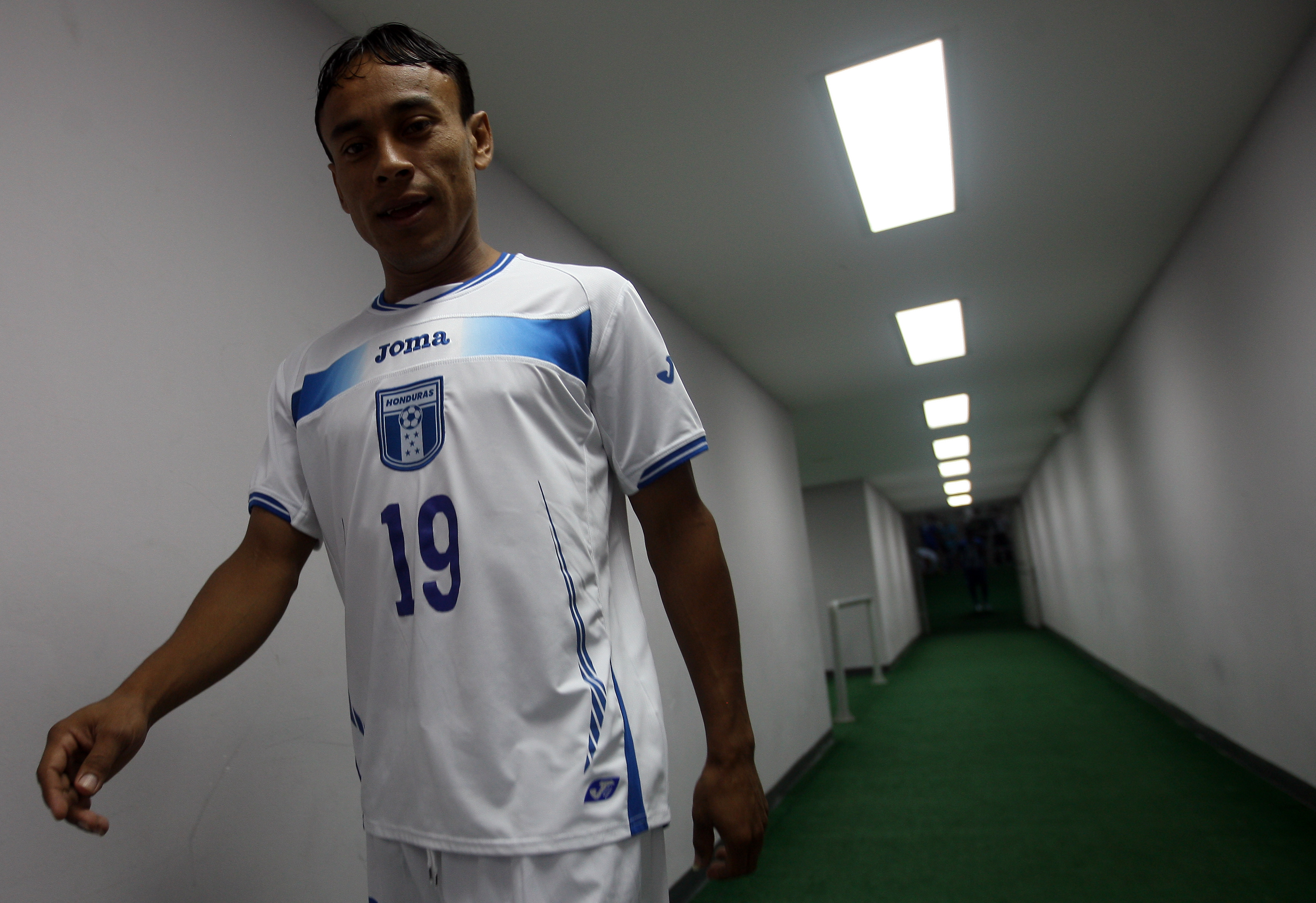
- Potrillo in 2011

Personal information
- Full name: Javier Arnaldo Portillo Martínez
- Date of birth: 10 June 1981 (age 45)
- Place of birth: Morolica, Honduras
- Positions: Defender; midfielder

Team information
- Current team: Naranja Mecánica
- Number: 25

Senior career*
Years	Team	Apps	(Gls)
2005–2006	Valencia	11	(1)
2006–2008	Hispano	53	(7)
2009–2010	Motagua	48	(0)
2011	Vida	20	(4)
2011–2015	Olimpia	93	(3)
2015–2016	Juticalpa	14	(2)
2016–2017	Real España	25	(2)
2017–2020	Vida	99	(2)
2020–2022	Olimpia	42	(0)
2023–	Naranja Mecánica		

International career^{‡}
2011–2014	Honduras	11	(0)
- * Club domestic league appearances and goals ‡ National team caps and goals as of 20 January 2021 (UTC)

Javier Arnaldo Portillo Martínez (born 10 June 1981) is a Honduran professional football player who plays as a left midfielder for Naranja Mecánica in the American ISLANO league.

== Club career ==
Portillo joined Vida in December 2010 signing a six-month contract with the club. He made his league debut on 15 January 2011, starting in an away 1–0 victory against the league champion Real España.

On 6 May 2011, Portillo moved to Olimpia as a free transfer signing a two-year contract with the club. He made his official debut for the club in the CONCACAF Champions League with a 3–1 defeat against Santos Laguna.

After many years in Honduran soccer, Portillo left C.D. Olimpia in the summer of 2022. In 2023, he started playing for the American amateur club Naranja Mecánica FC, which played in the ISLANO league in New Orleans.

== International career ==
On 20 May 2011, Portillo was included by Luis Fernando Suarez in Honduras's 23-man squad for the 2011 CONCACAF Gold Cup. On the 26th, he made his debut in a friendly draw against El Salvador.
