= 2008–09 Honduran Liga Nacional =

Liga Nacional
- Season: 2008–09
- Champions: Apertura: Marathón (7th); Clausura: Olimpia (22nd)
- Relegated: Real Juventud
- Champions League: Marathón; Olimpia; Real España
- Matches: 192
- Goals: 468 (2.44 per match)
- Top goalscorer: Ferreira (13); Lalín (13)
- Biggest home win: MAR 5–0 SAV
- Biggest away win: VIC 0–4 MOT; MOT 0–4 VIC; HIS 0–4 MAR
- Highest scoring: MAR 6–3 MOT
- All statistics correct as of 24 May 2009.

The 2017–18 Honduran Liga Nacional season was the 43rd Honduran Liga Nacional edition since its establishment in 1965. For this season, the system format remained the same as the previous season. The tournament ran from 19 July 2008 to 24 May 2009. The season was divided into two halves (Apertura and Clausura), each crowning one champion. C.D. Marathón and Club Deportivo Olimpia won one tournament each and qualified to the 2009–10 CONCACAF Champions League. Additionally, Real C.D. España also qualified with the best non-champion record as Belizean teams failed the CONCACAF stadium requirements.

== 2008–09 teams ==
Location of teams in 2008–09 season

A total of 10 teams competed in the tournament, including 9 sides from the 2007–08 season plus C.D. Real Juventud, promoted from the 2007–08 Liga de Ascenso.

Team	Location	Stadium	Capacity
Deportes Savio	Santa Rosa de Copán	Estadio Miraflores	3,000
Hispano	Comayagua	Estadio Carlos Miranda	10,000
Marathón	San Pedro Sula	Estadio Olímpico Metropolitano	37,000
Motagua	Tegucigalpa	Estadio Tiburcio Carías Andino	35,000
Olimpia	Tegucigalpa	Estadio Tiburcio Carías Andino	35,000
Platense	Puerto Cortés	Estadio Excélsior	7,910
Real España	San Pedro Sula	Estadio Francisco Morazán	26,781
Real Juventud	Santa Bárbara	Estadio Argelio Sabillón	5,000
Victoria	La Ceiba	Estadio Nilmo Edwards	18,000
Vida	La Ceiba	Estadio Nilmo Edwards	18,000

- Deportes Savio also used Estadio Roberto Martínez Ávila due to field renovations.
- C.D. Motagua also used Estadio Marcelo Tinoco due to field renovations.
- C.D. Olimpia also used Estadio Carlos Miranda due to field renovations.
- C.D. Platense also used Estadio Olímpico Metropolitano due to a dispute between the club and the city of Puerto Cortés.

== Apertura ==
=== Scouting reports ===
In the 2007–08 season, C.D. Platense suffered to avoid relegation in their last match. Their manager Nahúm Espinoza transformed the team. A key benchmark for Platense is midfielder Carlos Mejía. Platense has not fallen behind in signing new players for this tournament. New arrivals include Edilson Pereira, who played previously with Deportes Savio, Willian Veloso, who has shown in preseason matches to be a prominent goalscorer, and Evandro Ferreira, with his speed will try to unbalance the opposing defenses. To add to this is the experience of Walter López, who will be in charge of creating plays and give dynamism to the goalkeepers.

Manager Javier Padilla has stated that the main objective of the team is to retain their position in the league. C.D Victoria kept the core of the squad from previous tournaments and reinforced it with players including José Pineda, Juan Cárcamo, and Carlos Discua. The club also signed the Uruguayan players Richard Pérez and Mauricio Webber and promoted forwards Erick Ayala and Víctor Maldonado from the reserve squad. Victoria finished sixth in the previous tournament despite the financial investment from the club's owner.

Recently promoted C.D. Real Juventud have prepared for one goal: to maintain the position in the league. Since their establishment on 30 May 30 1965, the team never had the opportunity to be able to ascend and play in the Liga Nacional but they now find the opportunity to assemble their own history. Their manager Emilio Umanzor have stated in addition to staying in the league, the team will try to classify as one of the best four in the league and not playing a relegation battle like the majority of the sporting people and press have insisted. Real Juventud arrives with great expectations for the Apertura tournament. Real Juventud will fall upon the success of their Liga de Ascenso campaign and aim for decent position.

A team with the squad and budget of Deportes Savio obviously won't compete for the title. They will be playing their home matches on an unfamiliar field: Estadio Roberto Martínez Ávila in Siguatepeque, since their stadium is being remodeled. A key loss for the team is the Brazilian Edilson Pereira who signed with Platense. On the other hand, arrivals include goalie Hugo Caballero, the midfielders Marco Mejía and Elmer Marín, and forward Édgar Núñez. Deportes Savio will seek to grab points early on to avoid suffering like the previous tournament and with that seek, maybe not the playoff rounds, but their permanency in the league.

C.D.S. Vida will participate in the tournament with a modest team filled with prospects that intend to shine in the league. The directive administration will wage at their inferior categories that they intend to remain in the league. The challenges their manager Alberto Romero faces are difficult because he must erase the frustration from the fans and support the team's president character, who at the moment of saying things says it first and then thinks. The team president and manager have clashed before with Romero threatening to quit the team due to some unilateral decision but soon was resolved. Vida had a good preseason with many matches in the United States and Guatemala.

=== Regular season ===
==== Standings ====
Pos	Team	Pld	W	D	L	GF	GA	GD	Pts	Qualification or relegation
1	Real España	18	10	6	2	33	18	+15	38 (Note: Real España +2 points.)	Qualification to the Semifinals
2	Marathón	18	9	5	4	26	20	+6	32	Qualification to the Semifinals
3	Motagua	18	9	3	6	24	21	+3	30	Qualification to the Semifinals
4	Olimpia	18	8	5	5	19	17	+2	29	Qualification to the Semifinals
5	Deportes Savio	18	8	5	5	24	19	+5	28 (Note: Deportes Savio −1 point.)	
6	Hispano	18	7	4	7	31	28	+3	25	
7	Platense	18	6	5	7	22	25	−3	23	
8	Victoria	18	6	4	8	22	27	−5	22	
9	Real Juventud	18	3	3	12	13	24	−11	12	
10	Vida	18	1	6	11	10	25	−15	9	

==== Results ====
As of 22 November 2008

Home \ Away	SAV	HIS	MAR	MOT	OLI	PLA	RES	RJU	VIC	VID
Deportes Savio		2–1	2–1	2–1	0–1	2–1	1–1	2–1	3–1	1–1
Hispano	2–1		1–2	1–3	3–1	1–2	2–3	2–0	5–3	2–0
Marathón	2–2	0–2		4–0	1–0	2–1	0–2	1–0	1–1	1–1
Motagua	0–2	2–1	2–0		2–0	1–0	0–0	2–1	0–4	1–0
Olimpia	2–0	0–0	0–1	0–2		2–2	2–1	1–0	2–1	2–0
Platense	1–1	2–2	1–2	1–0	1–2		0–1	2–1	2–1	2–0
Real España	2–0	2–2	2–2	3–2	2–2	4–0		3–1	1–1	2–0
Real Juventud	0–3	3–1	0–1	1–1	0–0	1–1	0–1		2–0	0–1
Victoria	1–0	1–2	2–2	0–4	1–1	1–2	1–0	1–0		1–0
Vida	0–0	1–1	1–3	1–1	0–1	1–1	2–3	1–2	0–1	

Source: RSSSF
Legend: Blue = home team win; Yellow = draw; Red = away team win.
Match details

Round 1

Date	Home	Score	Away	Attendance
26 July 2008	Marathon	2:1	Platense	2116
26 July 2008	Victoria	0:4	Motagua	3355
27 July 2008	Deportes Savio	0:1	Real Espana	1500
27 July 2008	Real Juventud	0:1	Vida	1920
27 July 2008	Olimpia	0:0	Hispano	2167

Round 2

Date	Home	Score	Away	Attendance
30 July 2008	Platense	2:1	Victoria	-
30 July 2008	Marathón	1:0	Real Juventud	2269
30 July 2008	Motagua	2:1	Hispano	1363
30 July 2008	Vida	2:3	Real Espana	2287
31 July 2008	Deportes Savio	0:1	Olimpia	2,316

Round 3

Date	Home	Score	Away	Attendance
August 2, 2008	Real España	2:2	Marathón	8423
August 2, 2008	Hispano	2:0	Vida	953
August 2, 2008	Victoria	1:0	Deportes Savio	875
August 2, 2008	Platense	2:2	Olimpia	3589
August 2, 2008	Real Juventud	1:1	Motagua	3305

Round 4

Date	Home	Score	Away	Attendance
August 6, 2008	Platense	1:1	Deportes Savio	1594
August 6, 2008	Victoria	1:1	Olimpia	2852
August 6, 2008	Marathón	1:1	Vida	1141
August 6, 2008	Hispano	2:0	Real Juventud	1208
August 6, 2008	Motagua	0:0	Real Espana	2090

Round 5

Date	Home	Score	Away	Attendance
9 August 2008	Deportes Savio	2:1	Hispano	440
9 August 2008	Olimpia	0:1	Marathon	1487
9 August 2008	Vida	1:1	Motagua	2709
9 August 2008	Real Espana	4:0	Platense	2168
9 August 2008	Real Juventud	2:0	Victoria	1223

Round 6

Date	Home	Score	Away	Attendance
16 August 2008	Deportes Savio	2:1	Marathon	2441
16 August 2008	Hispano	5:3	Victoria	1186
16 August 2008	Vida	1:1	Platense	1,729
16 August 2008	Real Espana	3:1	Real Juventud	3188
11 September 2008	Motagua	2:0	Olimpia	4714

Round 7

Date	Home	Score	Away	Attendance
23 August 2008	Marathón	4:0	Motagua	2187
23 August 2008	Victoria	1:0	Vida	4202
24 August 2008	Platense	2:2	Hispano	1272
24 August 2008	Olimpia	2:1	Real Espana	3686
24 August 2008	Real Juventud	0:3	Deportes Savio	1165

Round 8

Date	Home	Score	Away	Attendance
30 August 2008	Real Espana	2:2	Hispano	2,016
30 August 2008	Victoria	2:2	Marathon	1,900
30 August 2008	Deportes Savio	1:1	Vida	134
30 August 2008	Motagua	1:0	Platense	916
30 August 2008	Real Juventud	0:0	Olimpia	2,711

Round 9

Date	Home	Score	Away	Attendance
7 September 2008	Platense	2:1	Real Juventud	1,241
7 September 2008	Real Espana	1:1	Victoria	1,858
7 September 2008	Vida	0:1	Olimpia	2,780
7 September 2008	Hispano	1:2	Marathon	1,102
7 September 2008	Motagua	0:2	Deportes Savio	1,500

Round 10

Date	Home	Score	Away	Attendance
13 September 2008	Real Espana	2:0	Deportes Savio	2114
13 September 2008	Vida	1:2	Real Juventud	831
14 September 2008	Hispano	3:1	Olimpia	1881
14 September 2008	Motagua	0:4	Victoria	1330
14 September 2008	Platense	1:2	Marathon	2584

Round 11

Date	Home	Score	Away	Attendance
20 September 2008	Victoria	1:2	Platense	1302
20 September 2008	Real España	2:0	Vida	1857
21 September 2008	Hispano	1:3	Motagua	2248
21 September 2008	Real Juventud	0:1	Marathón	1709
21 September 2008	Olimpia	2:0	Deportes Savio	1536

Round 12

Date	Home	Score	Away	Attendance
27 September 2008	Marathon	0:2	Real Espana	9335
27 September 2008	Vida	1:1	Hispano	507
27 September 2008	Platense	1:2	Olimpia	3518
27 September 2008	Deportes Savio	3:1	Victoria	135
27 September 2008	Motagua	2:1	Real Juventud	1134

Round 13

Date	Home	Score	Away	Attendance
4 October 2008	Vida	1:3	Marathón	811
4 October 2008	Real España	3:2	Motagua	5436
5 October 2008	Deportes Savio	2:1	Platense	2204
5 October 2008	Real Juventud	3:1	Hispano	535
5 October 2008	Olimpia	2:1	Victoria	1107

Round 14

Date	Home	Score	Away	Attendance
18 October 2008	Marathon	1:0	Olimpia	6650
18 October 2008	Victoria	1:0	Real Juventud	369
19 October 2008	Motagua	1:0	Vida	1675
19 October 2008	Platense	0:1	Real Espana	2356
19 October 2008	Hispano	2:1	Deportes Savio	225

Round 15

Date	Home	Score	Away	Attendance
25 October 2008	Marathón	2:2	Deportes Savio	1,369
25 October 2008	Victoria	1:2	Hispano	91
26 October 2008	Olimpia	0:2	Motagua	10,760
26 October 2008	Platense	2:0	Vida	449
26 October 2008	Real Juventud	0:1	Real Espana	1,480

Round 16

Date	Home	Score	Away	Attendance
1 November 2008	Real Espana	2:2	Olimpia	6521
1 November 2008	Vida	0:1	Victoria	1643
1 November 2008	Hispano	1:2	Platense	1189
1 November 2008	Motagua	2:0	Marathon	4836
1 November 2008	Deportes Savio	2:1	Real Juventud	1825

Round 17

Date	Home	Score	Away	Attendance
16 November 2008	Hispano	2:3	Real Espana	1059
16 November 2008	Platense	1:0	Motagua	1326
16 November 2008	Vida	0:0	Deportes Savio	390
16 November 2008	Marathon	1:1	Victoria	521
16 November 2008	Olimpia	1:0	Real Juventud	2952

Round 18

Date	Home	Score	Away	Attendance
23 November 2008	Victoria	1:0	Real España	317
23 November 2008	Marathon	0:2	Hispano	529
23 November 2008	Real Juventud	1:1	Platense	275
23 November 2008	Olimpia	2:0	Vida	2614
23 November 2008	Deportes Savio	2:1	Motagua	1920

- On 12 August, Real España obtained 2 additional points and Deportes Savio had 1 deducted for fielding an ineligible player in round 1; the goal records of both clubs remain unchanged.

=== Postseason ===
==== Semifinals ====
1st seed	Agg.	4th seed	1st leg	2nd leg
Real España	4–4	Olimpia	1–2	3–2
2nd seed	Agg.	3rd seed	1st leg	2nd leg
Marathón	1–1	Motagua	0–1	1–0

26 November 2008 1st leg	Olimpia	2–1	Real España	Tegucigalpa, Francisco Morazán
19:30	García 22'; Turcios 80'		90+2' Lalín	Stadium: Estadio Tiburcio Carías Andino; Attendance: 8,696; Referee: Mario Moncada

2 December 2008 2nd leg	Real España	3–2	Olimpia	San Pedro Sula, Cortés
19:30	Pavón 44' 60'; Lalín 83'		24' Núñez; 52' Bruschi	Stadium: Estadio Francisco Morazán; Attendance: 6,449; Referee: José Molina

- Real España 4–4 Olimpia on aggregated. Real España advanced on regular season record.

27 November 2008 1st leg	Motagua	1–0	Marathón	Tegucigalpa, Francisco Morazán
19:30	Castillo 64'			Stadium: Estadio Tiburcio Carías Andino; Attendance: 7,112; Referee: Geovanny Mendoza

3 December 2008 2nd leg	Marathón	1–0	Motagua	San Pedro Sula, Cortés
19:30	Norales 57'			Stadium: Estadio Olímpico Metropolitano; Attendance: 7,643; Referee: Óscar Moncada

- Marathón 1–1 Motagua on aggregated. Marathón advanced on regular season record.

==== Final ====
1st seeded	Agg.	2nd seeded	1st leg	2nd leg
Real España	1–2	Marathón	0–1	1–1

7 December 2008 1st leg	Marathón	1–0	Real España	San Pedro Sula, Cortés
	Mejía 58'			Stadium: Estadio Olímpico Metropolitano; Attendance: 13,429; Referee: Óscar Moncada

Marathón	Real España

GK	27	(Uruguay) Juan Obelar
RB	–	(Honduras) Erick Norales
CB	–	(Honduras) Mario Beata
CB	–	(Honduras) Óscar Bonilla
LB	–	(Honduras) Marvin Chávez
CM	–	(Honduras) Mariano Acevedo
CM	–	(Honduras) Reinieri Mayorquín
CM	13	(Honduras) Dennis Ferrera
CM	19	(Honduras) Mario Berríos
SS	–	(Honduras) Carlos Mejía	Substituted off
CF	–	(Honduras) Milton Núñez	Substituted off
Substitutions:
FW	–	(Costa Rica) Andy Furtado	Substituted on
FW	–	(Honduras) Saúl Martínez	Substituted on
MF	–	(Honduras) Arnold Solórzano	Substituted on
Manager:
(Uruguay) Manuel Keosseián

GK	–	(Uruguay) Marcelo Macías
RB	–	(Honduras) Nery Medina
CB	–	(Honduras) Marlon Peña
CB	–	(Honduras) Elder Valladares
LB	–	(Honduras) Carlos Palacios
CM	–	(Honduras) Elkin González
CM	–	(Honduras) Alex Andino	Substituted off
CM	–	(Brazil) Carlinho
CM	–	(Honduras) Mario Rodríguez
CF	–	(Honduras) Carlos Pavón	Substituted off
CF	–	(Brazil) Everaldo Ferreira	Substituted off
Substitutions:
FW	–	(Honduras) Allan Lalín	Substituted on
MF	–	(Honduras) Mario Martínez	Substituted on
FW	–	(Brazil) Edmilson da Silva	Substituted on
Manager:
(Argentina) Mario Zanabria

13 December 2008 2nd leg	Real España	1–1	Marathón	San Pedro Sula, Cortés
19:30	Ferreira 33'		90+2' Berríos	Stadium: Estadio Francisco Morazán; Attendance: 19,000; Referee: José Molina

Real España	Marathón

GK	-	(Uruguay) Marcelo Macías
RB	–	(Honduras) Nery Medina
CB	–	(Honduras) Marlon Peña	(red card) 90'
CB	–	(Honduras) Elder Valladares
LB	–	(Honduras) Carlos Palacios
DM	–	(Honduras) Mario Rodríguez
CM	–	(Honduras) Alex Andino
CM	–	(Honduras) Elkin González
CM	–	(Brazil) Carlinho
CF	–	(Honduras) Allan Lalín	Substituted off
CF	–	(Brazil) Everaldo Ferreira
Substitutions:
FW	–	(Honduras) Carlos Pavón	Substituted on
Manager:
(Argentina) Mario Zanabria

GK	27	(Uruguay) Juan Obelar
RB	23	(Honduras) Mauricio Sabillón
CB	–	(Honduras) Erick Norales
CB	–	(Honduras) Mario Beata
LB	–	(Honduras) Óscar Bonilla
DM	–	(Honduras) Reinieri Mayorquín
CM	19	(Honduras) Mario Berríos
RM	–	(Honduras) Mariano Acevedo
LM	–	(Honduras) Marvin Chávez
SS	–	(Honduras) Carlos Will Mejía
CF	–	(Honduras) Milton Núñez	Substituted off
Substitutions:
FW	–	(Honduras) Jerry Palacios	Substituted on	(red card) 90'
Manager:
(Uruguay) Manuel Keosseián

- Marathón won 2–1 on aggregate.

Honduran Liga Nacional
2008–09 Apertura champion

7th title

=== Top goalscorers ===
As of 13 December 2008

13 goals

- (Brazil) Everaldo Ferreira (Real España)

9 goals

- (Brazil) Marcelo Cabrita (Platense)

8 goals

- (Honduras) Leonardo Isaula (Hispano)
- (Honduras) Allan Lalín (Real España)

7 goals

- (Colombia) Mauricio Copete (Victoria)
- (Brazil) Ney Costa (Deportes Savio)
- (Honduras) Milton Ruiz (Hispano)

6 goals

- (Uruguay) Oscar Torlacoff (Motagua)
- (Uruguay) Ramiro Bruschi (Olimpia)
- (Honduras) Carlos Pavón (Real España)

5 goals

- (Honduras) Saúl Martínez (Marathón)
- (Uruguay) Nicolás Cardozo (Vida)
- (Brazil) Jocimar Nascimento (Motagua)
- (Honduras) Rigoberto Padilla (Hispano)
- (Honduras) Nery Medina (Real España)
- (Honduras) Wilmer Velásquez (Olimpia)
- (Honduras) Carlos Will Mejía (Marathón)

4 goals

- (Honduras) Marvin Chávez (Marathón)
- (Honduras) Jorge Lozano (Deportes Savio)

3 goals

- (Honduras) Mario Rodríguez (Real España)
- (Brazil) Marcelo Cabecao (Hispano)
- (Honduras) Mauricio Sabillón (Marathón)
- (Honduras) Juan Manuel Cárcamo (Victoria)
- (Honduras) Georgie Welcome (Motagua)
- (Brazil) Evandro Ferreira (Platense)
- (Honduras) Danilo Turcios (Olimpia)
- (Honduras) Carlos Paez (Real Juventud)

2 goals

- (Honduras) Oscar Vargas (Vida)
- (Honduras) Mario Euceda (Deportes Savio)
- (Honduras) Carlos Discua (Victoria)
- (Honduras) Harrison Róchez (Deportes Savio)
- (Colombia) Charles Córdova (Real Juventud)
- (Honduras) Carlos Morán (Victoria)
- (Uruguay) Mauricio Weber (Victoria)
- (Honduras) Adán Ramírez (Platense)
- (Honduras) Reinaldo Tilguath (Motagua)
- (Honduras) Milton Núñez (Marathón)
- (Honduras) Javier Portillo (Hispano)
- (Brazil) Marcelo Ferreira (Platense)
- (Honduras) David Molina (Motagua)
- (Honduras) Ninrod Medina (Victoria)
- (Brazil) Juliano Rangel (Deportes Savio)
- (Honduras) Carlos Navarro (Real Juventud)
- (Honduras) Mariano Acevedo (Marathón)
- (Honduras) Oscar Zepeda (Deportes Savio)
- (Honduras) David Meléndez (Real Juventud)
- (Honduras) Ramón Núñez (Olimpia)
- (Honduras) Erick Norales (Marathón)

1 goal

- (Honduras) Rubén Rivera (Motagua)
- (Brazil) Willian Veloso (Platense)
- (Honduras) Miguel Castillo (Motagua)
- (Honduras) Orvin Paz (Marathón)
- (Honduras) Lenín Suárez (Deportes Savio)
- (Honduras) Diktmart Hernández (Victoria)
- (Honduras) Bani Lozano (Platense)
- (Honduras) Shannon Welcome (Motagua)
- (Brazil) Carlos Dias (Real España)
- (Honduras) Maynor Gómez (Real Juventud)
- (Honduras) Rubén Matamoros (Hispano)
- (Honduras) Walter Hernández (Olimpia)
- (Brazil) Edilson Pereira (Platense)
- (Honduras) Rony Morales (Olimpia)
- (Honduras) John Pérez (Hispano)
- (Honduras) Johnny Galdámez (Deportes Savio)
- (Brazil) Nilberto da Silva (Motagua)
- (Honduras) Francisco Díaz (Platense)
- (Honduras) Elkin González (Real España)
- (Honduras) Oscar Fortín (Deportes Savio)
- (Argentina) Pablo Genovese (Hispano)
- (Argentina) Gabriel Casas (Vida)
- (Honduras) Juan Carlos García (Marathón)
- (Honduras) Luis López (Marathón)
- (Honduras) Edgar Núñez (Deportes Savio)
- (Honduras) Luis Pérez (Platense)
- (Honduras) Henry Bermúdez (Victoria)
- (Honduras) Francisco Aguilar (Real Juventud)
- (Honduras) Hendry Thomas (Olimpia)
- (Honduras) Román Castillo (Vida)
- (Honduras) Cristian Altamirano (Deportes Savio)
- (Honduras) Ronald del Cid (Real Juventud)
- (Brazil) Allan Kardeck (Olimpia)
- (Honduras) Carlos Salinas (Vida)
- (Honduras) Jerry Palacios (Marathón)
- (Honduras) Angel Rodríguez (Real Juventud)
- (Honduras) Víctor Bernárdez (Motagua)
- (Costa Rica) Andy Furtado (Marathón)
- (Honduras) Mario Martínez (Real España)
- (Brazil) Fabio de Souza (Olimpia)
- (Honduras) Abner Méndez (Hispano)
- (Honduras) Erick Zepeda (Platense)
- (Honduras) Henry Jiménez (Hispano)
- (Honduras) Richard Pérez (Victoria)
- (Honduras) Francisco Valladares (Motagua)
- (Honduras) Víctor Arzú (Victoria)
- (Argentina) Sergio Diduch (Hispano)
- (Honduras) Oscar Bonieck García (Olimpia)
- (Honduras) Fernando Castillo (Motagua)
- (Honduras) Mario Berríos (Marathón)
- (Belize) Elroy Smith (Deportes Savio) (o.g.)

=== Squads ===
Club	Goalkeepers	Defenders	Midfielders	Forwards
Deportes Savio	Yul Arzú, Hugo Caballero, José Manuel Portillo	Vicente Solórzano, Jorge Lozano, Oscar Fortín, Johnny Galdámez, Mario Padilla, Mario Euceda, Juliano de Andrade, Lenín Suárez	Elron Smith, Elmer Marín, Juan Manuel Coello, Oscar Zepeda, Christian Altamirano, Mario Chávez, Marco Mejía, Walter Villalobos, Anael Figueroa	Harrison Róchez, Edwin Jiménez, Ney Costa, Darwin Oliva, Kevin Portillo
Hispano	Kerpo de León, Pedro Alvarez, Emmanuel Díaz	Leonardo Morales, Darwin Pacheco, Esdras Padilla, Matías Espíndola, Eliud Membreño, Ronmel Murillo	Máximo Arzú, Johnny Arce, Tony Velasquez, Carlos Blandón, Edward Mejía, Pablo Genovese, Javier Portillo, Rubén Matamoros, David Alvarez, Leonardo Isaula	Henry Jiménez, Héctor Castro, Sergio Diduch, Rigoberto Padilla, Fredy Benítez, Marcelo Segales, Luis López, Marcelo López, Edilson Aguilar, Milton Ruiz
Marathon	Juan Angel Obelar, Víctor Coello, Kelvin Castillo	Dennis Ferrera, Pastor Martínez, Juan Carlos García, Astor Henríquez, Arnold Solórzano, Milton Palacios, Erick Norales, Mauricio Sabillón, Mario Beata, Luis Santamaría	Oscar Bonilla, Orvin Paz, Reinieri Mayorquín, Marvin Chávez, Mario Berríos, Mariano Acevedo, Pompilio Mejía, Franco Sosa, Carlos Oliva, Oscar Galeas	Milton Núñez, Jerry Palacios, Saúl Martínez, Andy Furtado, José Güity, Kurt Cárcamo, Carlos Will Mejía
Motagua	Ricardo Canales, Donaldo Morales, Rony García	Víctor Bernárdez, Samir García, Guillermo Díaz, Nilberto Da Silva, Roy Posas, David Molina, Steven Morris, Emilson Cruz, Aaron Bardales, Oscar Bernárdez	Jorge Claros, Fernando Castillo, Miguel Castillo, Luis Guzmán, Víctor Mena, Rubén Rivera, José Rivera, Ronald Martínez, Luis Rodas	Oscar Torlacoff, Jocimar, Richard Lloyd, Kevin Osorio, José Burgos, Shannon Welcome
Olimpia	Noel Valladares, Donis Escober, Gustavo Pineda	Jaime Rosales, Sergio Mendoza, Francisco Arévalo, Nahún Avila, Rony Morales, Yobani Avila, Fabio de Souza, Nahún Güity, Francisco López	Walter Hernández, Irvin Reyna, Samir Arzú, Wilfredo Barahona, Jesús Navas, Ramón Núñez, Danilo Turcios, Néstor Silva, Johnny Calderón	Wilmer Velásquez, Ramiro Bruschi, Allan Júnior, Erick Andino, Luis Garrido
Platense	Júnior Morales, Sandro Cárcamo	Odis Borjas, David Meza, Gabriel Hernández, Luis Urbina, Quiarol Arzú, Erick Zepeda, Osman Chávez, Luis Pérez, Manuel Doño, Francisco Díaz, Fredy Escobar	Pedro Domínguez, Adán Ramírez, Bany Lozano, Hendry Córdova, Irbin Guerrero, Misael Ruiz, Odis Borjas, Walter López, Edilson Pereira, Willian Veloso	Marcelo Dos Santos, Evandro Ferreira, Alexander Aguilar
Real España	Marcelo Macías, Orlin Vallecillo, Tomás Meléndez	Elder Valladares, Eric Vallecillo, Marlon Peña, Carlos Palacios, Maynor Martínez, Nery Medina, Andrés Morales, César Oseguera, Jeremy Hernández	Mario Rodríguez, Carlos Dias, Elkin González, Jorge Zaldívar, Alex Andino, Mario Martínez, Fairon Barahona, Fernando Mercado, Melvin Valladares, Eder Delgado, Dany Reyes	Carlos Pavón, Edmilson Da Silva, Everaldo Ferreira, Allan Lalín, Ramón Castillo, Héctor Flores, Fredy Sosa
Real Juventud	Adalid Puerto, José Orlando Rivera, José Luis Rosales, Elmer Canales	Júnior Turcios, Luis Castro, Kevin Sambulá, César Anariba, Rony Paz, Carlos Navarro, Juan Carlos Róchez, Lucio Argueta, Heber Argueta, Marlon Soto	David Rocha, David Meléndez, Luis Lagos, Juan Tablada, Gerson Martínez, Ronald Del Cid, Jorge Fúnez, Jair Aragón, Denovan Morales, Marcelo Monteiro, Rolando Figueroa, Carlos Páez, Carlos Castellanos	Randy Diamond, Charles Córdoba, Angel Rodríguez, Luciano Valerio, Julio Canales, Francisco Aguilar
Victoria	John Bodden, Diego Vásquez, Kenneth Zapata	Orleans Fúnez, Ninrol Medina, Júnior Izaguirre, Pablo Montes, Mario Gómez, Wilson Güity, Wilmer Crisanto, Cristian Batiz, Henry Bermúdez	Juan Raudales, Carlos Morán, Richard Pérez, Mauricio Webber, José L. Pineda, Odair Bernárdez, Dictmar Hernández, Pedro Fernández, David A. Doño	Juan Cárcamo, Carlos Discua, Johnny Avila, Leonel Maldonado, Erick Ayala
Vida	Williams Negrete, Obed Enamorado, Oscar Banegas	Angel Hill, Justo Norales, Brayan Beckeles, Carlos Arbizú, Gabriel Casas, Miguel Martínez, Arturo Avila, Walter Williams	Arnold Peralta, Borghi Arbizú, Carlos Salinas, Carlos Solórzano, Elvin López, Juan Pérez, Julio Ocampo, Orlin Peralta, Leslie Orozco	Nicolás Cardozo, Armando Mena, Román Castillo, Oscar Vargas, Jerry Bengton, Darian Alvarez, Darin Quin Lambert

The 2008–09 Clausura was the second part of the 2008–09 season of the Liga Nacional de Fútbol de Honduras, the first division national football league in Honduras. The season started on 10 January 2009 and finished on 24 May 2009. It followed the 2008–09 Apertura season. The winner will compete in the 2009-10 CONCACAF Champions League.

== Clausura ==
=== Regular season ===
==== Standings ====
Pos	Team	Pld	W	D	L	GF	GA	GD	Pts	Qualification or relegation
1	Olimpia	18	11	4	3	24	10	+14	37	Qualified to the Final round (Note: Top 4 qualify to final round.)
2	Marathón	18	10	4	4	42	23	+19	34	Qualified to the Final round
3	Real España	18	8	6	4	20	12	+8	30	Qualified to the Final round
4	Vida	18	6	8	4	18	19	−1	26	Qualified to the Final round
5	Victoria	18	6	7	5	24	21	+3	25	
6	Deportes Savio	18	5	5	8	17	21	−4	20	
7	Real Juventud	18	4	7	7	15	21	−6	19	
8	Motagua	18	4	7	7	13	21	−8	19	
9	Platense	17	4	6	7	20	26	−6	18 (Note: The match between Platense and Hispano from Round 18 was not played due to lack of interest.)	
10	Hispano	17	3	2	12	18	37	−19	11	

Updated to match(es) played on 2 May 2009. Source:
Notes:

On 2 May, Honduras was awarded a 3rd spot in the 2009–10 CONCACAF Champions League due to lack of adequate stadia in Belize. The 3rd spot would go to the short tournament runner-up with the highest overall season points total. Because of Real C.D. Espana's overall season point total of 68 being highest in the league, they clinch a spot in the 2009–10 CONCACAF Champions League. Already a runner-up from Apertura 2008, it is guaranteed that the Clausura 2009 runner-up would not have a higher overall season point total than Real Espana.

==== Results ====
As of 2 May 2009

Home \ Away	SAV	HIS	MAR	MOT	OLI	PLA	RES	RJU	VIC	VID
Deportes Savio		1–0	4–1	0–0	0–1	1–0	1–1	0–1	2–0	1–2
Hispano	1–1		0–4	1–2	1–4	3–5	0–1	3–2	2–1	4–2
Marathón	5–0	3–0		6–3	1–3	1–1	0–0	3–1	2–2	4–1
Motagua	0–2	1–0	0–1		0–1	1–0	1–0	0–0	0–3	0–0
Olimpia	2–0	1–0	2–2	1–0		3–0	0–2	0–0	3–1	0–0
Platense	0–1		1–2	4–3	1–2		2–1	1–1	1–0	1–1
Real España	2–1	2–0	0–3	0–0	0–0	3–0		2–1	1–1	0–1
Real Juventud	2–2	3–2	1–2	1–1	1–0	1–0	0–2		0–0	0–0
Victoria	2–1	3–0	2–1	1–1	0–1	2–2	1–1	1–0		1–1
Vida	1–0	1–1	2–1	0–0	1–0	1–1	0–2	2–0	2–3	

Source: RSSSF
Legend: Blue = home team win; Yellow = draw; Red = away team win.

Platense–Hispano not played due to irrelevance.

Match details

Round 1

10 January 2009
19:30

Platense	1–0	Victoria
Arzú 44'

Estadio Excelsior, Puerto Cortés
Attendance: 1,447
Referee: Erick Andino

10 January 2009
19:30

Real España	2–0	Hispano
Da Silva 29' 80'

Estadio Francisco Morazan, San Pedro Sula
Attendance: 1,794
Referee: Miguel Torres

11 January 2009
15:00

Vida	1–0	Olimpia
Güity 63'

Estadio Nilmo Edwards, La Ceiba
Attendance: 4,742

11 January 2009
16:00

Motagua	0–0	Real Juventud

Estadio Tiburcio Carías Andino, Tegucigalpa
Attendance: 3,157
Referee: Luis Flores

14 January 2009
19:30

Marathón	5–0	Deportes Savio
Brown 28' 45'; Núñez 46'; Ramírez 76' 88'

Estadio Olimpico Metropolitano, San Pedro Sula
Attendance: 1,539
Referee: Héctor Rodríguez

Round 2

17 January 2009
19:30

Real España	3–0	Platense
Martínez 24'; Valladares 41'; Dias 80'

San Pedro Sula
Attendance: 757
Referee: Héctor Rodríguez

17 January 2009
19:30

Olimpia	0–0	Real Juventud

Tegucigalpa
Attendance: 2,645
Referee: José Sandoval

18 January 2009
14:00

Deportes Savio	0–0	Motagua

Santa Rosa
Attendance: 1,542
Referee: Miguel Torres

18 January 2009
15:30

Hispano	4–2	Vida
Membreño 7'; Diduch 31' 49'; Méndez 85'		Williams 59'; Santamaría 90'

Comayagua
Attendance: 1,546
Referee: Ricardo Zelaya

18 January 2009
15:30

Victoria	2–1	Marathón
García 46' (og); Cárcamo 47'		Palacios 70'

La Ceiba
Attendance: 1,038
Referee: Luis Flores

Round 3

24 January 2009
19:30

Marathón	0–0	Real España

San Pedro Sula
Attendance: 4,026

25 January 2009
15:00

Real Juventud	0–0	Victoria

Santa Bárbara
Attendance: 1,506

25 January 2009
15:00

Platense	1–2	Olimpia
Cabrita 88'		Bruschi 20' 54'

Puerto Cortés
Attendance: 2,721

25 January 2009
15:00

Vida	1–0	Deportes Savio
Vargas 88'

La Ceiba
Attendance: 1,189

25 January 2009
16:00

Motagua	1–0	Hispano
Torlacoff 89' (pen)

Comayagua
Attendance: 2,637
Referee: Armando Castro

Round 4

31 January 2009
19:30

Hispano	1–1	Deportes Savio
Diduch 40'		Zepeda 30'

Comayagua
Attendance: 1,500

31 January 2009
19:30

Real España	1–1	Victoria
Lalín 39'		Segales 79'

San Pedro Sula
Attendance: 1,465
Referee: Ricardo Zelaya

1 February 2009
15:30

Real Juventud	1–0	Platense
Navarro 70'

Santa Bárbara
Attendance: 1,005

1 February 2009
15:30

Vida	0–0	Motagua

La Ceiba
Attendance: 2,594
Referee: José Gaspar Molina

3 February 2009
19:30

Olimpia	2–2	Marathón
Bruschi 10' 15'		Palacios 17' (pen); Brown 21'

Tegucigalpa
Attendance: 3,244
Referee: Oscar Moncada

Round 5

7 February 2009
19:30

Platense	1–1	Vida
Lozano 78' (pen)		Solórzano 21'

Puerto Cortés
Attendance: 1,290

7 February 2009
19:30

Marathón	3–0	Hispano
Núñez 21'; Ramírez 25'; Sosa 70' (pen)

San Pedro Sula
Attendance: 753

8 February 2009

Deportes Savio	0–1	Real Juventud
		Ocampo 70'

Santa Rosa de Copán
Attendance: 1,033

8 February 2009

Victoria	0–1	Olimpia
		Velásquez 8'

La Ceiba
Attendance: 4,040

8 February 2009
16:00

Motagua	1–0	Real España
Welcome 67'

Tegucigalpa
Attendance: 3,778
Referee: Oscar Moncada

Round 6

14 February 2009

Victoria	3–0	Hispano
Ortiz 26'; Copete 32'; Medina 90+1'

La Ceiba
Attendance: 441

14 February 2009

Marathón	1–1	Platense
Palacios 23'		Lozano 44'

San Pedro Sula
Attendance: 752

15 February 2009

Real Juventud	0–0	Vida

Santa Bárbara
Attendance: 1,577

15 February 2009

Deportes Savio	1–1	Real España
Costa 65' (pen)		Pavón 42'

Santa Rosa de Copán
Attendance: 1,132

15 February 2009

Olimpia	1–0	Motagua
Thomas 76' (pen)

Tegucigalpa
Attendance: 9,463
Referee: Gaspar Molina

Round 7

21 February 2009

Platense	0–0	Deportes Savio

Puerto Cortés
Attendance: 947

21 February 2009

Real España	0–0	Olimpia

San Pedro Sula
Attendance: 5,404

22 February 2009

Hispano	3–2	Real Juventud
Diduch 12' 45'; Ruiz 42'		Salgado 57' OG; Paz 74'

Comayagua
Attendance: 979

22 February 2009

Vida	2–3	Victoria
Guity 8' 48'		Arzú 29' 90'; Fernández 42'

La Ceiba
Attendance: 3,989

22 February 2009

Motagua	0–1	Marathón
		Palacios 54'

Tegucigalpa
Attendance: 2,798

Round 8

18 February 2009

Marathón	3–1	Real Juventud
Berríos 10'; Ulloa 59' OG; Mejía 88'		Paz 70'

San Pedro Sula
Attendance: 1,070

25 February 2009

Platense	4–3	Motagua
Lozano 15' (pen); Ramírez 38' 45'; Ruiz 63'		Cruz 5'; Torlacoff 35' (pen); Welcome 75'

Puerto Cortés
Attendance: 1,287

25 February 2009

Vida	0–2	Real España
		Caetano 25'; Pavón 42'

La Ceiba
Attendance: 1,119

25 February 2009

Olimpia	1–0	Hispano
Cicogna 69'

Tegucigalpa
Attendance: 1,637

25 February 2009

Deportes Savio	2–0	Victoria
Lozano 47'; Roches 64'

Santa Rosa de Copán
Attendance: 647

Round 9

1 March 2009

Real Juventud	0–2	Real España
		Caetano 38'; Delgado 59'

Santa Bárbara
Attendance: 1,390

1 March 2009

Hispano	3–5	Platense
Ruiz 59'; Diduch 62' 82'		Ramírez 23'; Flores 45'; Osorio 45'; Hernández 48'; Cabrita 85'

Comayagua
Attendance: 1,326

1 March 2009

Victoria	1–1	Motagua
Morán 75'		Welcome 72'

La Ceiba
Attendance: 1,662

1 March 2009

Olimpia	2–0	Deportes Savio
Hernández 27'; Cicogna 55'

Tegucigalpa
Attendance: 2,424

25 March 2009

Marathón	4–1	Vida
Scott 20' 40'; Martínez 75'; Palacios 90+4' (pen)		Ferreira 14'

San Pedro Sula
Attendance: 1,020

Round 10

7 March 2009

Victoria	2–2	Platense
Copete 29' 29'		Lozano 70'; Chávez 90'

La Ceiba
Attendance: 874

7 March 2009

Hispano	0–1	Real España
		Lalín 7'

Comayagua
Attendance: 1,636

8 March 2009

Deportes Savio	4–1	Marathón
Costa 8' 23'; Róchez 27'; Zepeda 57'		Martínez 83'

Santa Rosa de Copán
Attendance: 1,439

8 March 2009

Real Juventud	1–1	Motagua
Córdoba 78'		Molina 45'

Santa Bárbara
Attendance: 1,159

8 March 2009

Olimpia	0–0	Vida

Tegucigalpa
Attendance: 4,236

Round 11

11 March 2009

Real Juventud	1–0	Olimpia
Córdoba 22'

Santa Rosa de Copán
Attendance: 1,857

11 March 2009

Platense	2–1	Real España
Lozano 38' (Pen); Chávez 57'		Castillo 73'

Puerto Cortés
Attendance: 2,757

11 March 2009

Vida	1–1	Hispano
Arguello 87'		Diduch 57'

La Ceiba
Attendance: 805

11 March 2009

Marathón	2–2	Victoria
Palacios 16'; Mejía 71'		Morán 25'; Hernández 59'

San Pedro Sula
Attendance: 840

11 March 2009

Motagua	0–2	Deportes Savio
		Díaz 81' (OG); Costa 87'

Tegucigalpa
Attendance: 1,281

Round 12

14 March 2009

Victoria	1–0	Real Juventud
Gómez 89'

La Ceiba
Attendance: 780

14 March 2009

Real España	0–3	Marathón
		Martínez 11' 34' 58'

San Pedro Sula
Attendance: 3,451
Referee: José Sandoval

14 March 2009
19:30

Hispano	1–2	Motagua
Díaz 86' OG		Welcome 6'; Isaula 65'

Tegucigalpa
Attendance: 1,137

15 March 2009

Deportes Savio	1–2	Vida
Zepeda 16'		Güity 7'; Chávez 57'

Santa Rosa de Copán
Attendance: 1,204
Referee: Ricardo Zelaya

15 March 2009
16:00

Olimpia	3–0	Platense
de Souza 11'; Chávez 55' OG; Calderón 59'

Tegucigalpa
Attendance: 4,142
Referee: Mario Moncada

Round 13

21 March 2009
19:30

Platense	1–1	Real Juventud
Cabrita 57'		Flores 34'

Puerto Cortés
Attendance: 1,287

21 March 2009
15:00

Victoria	1–1	Real España
Copete 18'		Martínez 83'

La Ceiba
Attendance: 1,265

21 March 2009
19:30

Marathón	1–3	Olimpia
Núñez 78' (pen)		Hernández 43' (pen); Palacios 55' (OG); Velásquez 89'

San Pedro Sula
Attendance: 4,770

22 March 2009
14:00

Deportes Savio	1–0	Hispano
Figueroa 63'

Santa Rosa de Copán
Attendance: 548
Referee: Evaristo Soriano

22 March 2009
16:00

Motagua	0–0	Vida

Tegucigalpa
Attendance: 1,659
Referee: Geovani Mendoza

Round 14

4 April 2009
19:30

Real España	0–0	Motagua

San Pedro Sula
Attendance: 2,133
Referee: Benigno Pineda

5 April 2009

Real Juventud	2–2	Deportes Savio
Ulloa 12'; Flores 36'		Costa 33'; Lozano 86'

Santa Bárbara
Attendance: 572

5 April 2009
15:30

Hispano	0–4	Marathón
		Mejía 48'; Acevedo 58'; Brown 71'; Núñez 88'

Comayagua
Attendance: 760

5 April 2009

Vida	1–1	Platense
Chávez 42' (OG)		Lozano 78'

La Ceiba
Attendance: 1,770

5 April 2009
16:00

Olimpia	3–1	Victoria
Velásquez 6'; Thomas 58'; Rojas 87'		Morán 8'

Tegucigalpa
Attendance: 2,562

Round 15

15 April 2009

Hispano	2–1	Victoria
Diduch 10' (pen); Arzú 68'		Fernández 19'

Comayagua
Attendance: 922
Referee: José Sandoval

15 April 2009

Platense	1–2	Marathón
Guerrero 49'		Beata 20'; Norales 61'

Puerto Cortés
Attendance: 2,254
Referee: Geovani Mendoza

15 April 2009

Vida	2–0	Real Juventud
Bengtson; Antúnez

La Ceiba
Attendance: 2,990
Referee: Ricardo Zelaya

15 April 2009

Real España	2–1	Deportes Savio
Lalín 1' 76'		Lozano 54'

San Pedro Sula
Attendance: 833
Referee: Armando Castro

16 April 2009

Motagua	0–1	Olimpia
		Calderón 70'

Tegucigalpa
Attendance: 7,358
Referee: Mario Moncada

Round 16

19 April 2009
15:30

Real Juventud	3–2	Hispano
Navarro 3'; Flores 67' 88'		Jiménez 30'; Palacios 89'

Santa Bárbara
Attendance: 442

19 April 2009
14:00

Deportes Savio	1–0	Platense
Altamirano 68'

Santa Rosa de Copán
Attendance: 798

19 April 2009
15:00

Victoria	1–1	Vida
Weber 11'		Antúnez 63'

La Ceiba
Attendance: 5,544

19 April 2009
18:00

Marathón	6–3	Motagua
Scott 20' 50'; Chávez 42'; Mejía 44'; Sabillón 67'; Núñez 85'		Lloyd 11'; Rivera 52'; Díaz 78'

San Pedro Sula
Attendance: 3,246
Referee: Marlon Muñoz

19 April 2009
16:00

Olimpia	0–2	Real España
		da Silva 2'; Martínez 58'

Tegucigalpa
Attendance: 5,058

Round 17

26 April 2009
15:30

Real Juventud	1–2	Marathón
Flores 82'		Beata 10'; Chávez 90'

Santa Bárbara
Attendance: 1,125

26 April 2009
15:30

Hispano	1–4	Olimpia
Diduch 76'		Rosales 9' 61'; Rojas 24'; Velásquez 62'

Comayagua
Attendance: 2,229

26 April 2009
15:30

Victoria	2–1	Deportes Savio
Güity 39' 72'		Smith 34'

La Ceiba
Attendance: 836

26 April 2009
15:30

Real España	0–1	Vida
		Beckele 52'

San Pedro Sula
Attendance: 1,081

26 April 2009
15:30

Motagua	1–0	Platense
Izaguirre 17'

Tegucigalpa
Attendance: 1,930

Round 18

2 May 2009
15:30

Deportes Savio	0–1	Olimpia
		Velásquez 35'

Santa Rosa de Copán
Attendance: 1,962

2 May 2009
15:30

Platense	canceled	Hispano

Puerto Cortés

2 May 2009
15:30

Vida	2–1	Marathón
Beckele 26'; Salinas 58'		Brown 50'

La Ceiba
Attendance: 4,118

2 May 2009
15:30

Real España	2–1	Real Juventud
Martínez 50'; Lalín 56'		Córdova 30' (pen)

San Pedro Sula
Attendance: 520

2 May 2009
15:30

Motagua	0–3	Victoria
		Güity 18'; Copete 32'; Discua 45'

Tegucigalpa
Attendance: 859

=== Postseason ===
Semifinals
1	Olimpia	0	2	2
4	Vida	1	0	1
2	Marathón	1	1	2
3	Real España	3	3	6

Final
1	Olimpia (aet)	2	2	4
3	Real España	2	1	3

==== Semifinals ====
1st seed	Agg.	4th seed	1st leg	2nd leg
Olimpia	2–1	Vida	0–1	2–0
2nd seed	Agg.	3rd seed	1st leg	2nd leg
Marathón	2–6	Real España	1–3	1–3

7 May 2009 1st leg	Vida	1–0	Olimpia	La Ceiba, Atlántida
	Argüello 62'			Stadium: Estadio Nilmo Edwards; Attendance: 14,700; Referee: José Sandoval

10 May 2009 2nd leg	Olimpia	2–0	Vida	Tegucigalpa, Francisco Morazán
16:00	Velásquez 34'; Turcios			Stadium: Estadio Tiburcio Carías Andino; Attendance: 12,505; Referee: Benigno Pineda

- Olimpia won 2–1 on aggregate.

7 May 2009 1st leg	Real España	3–1	Marathón	San Pedro Sula, Cortés
	Martínez 3'; Caetano 11'; González 47'		63' Chávez	Attendance: 5,610; Referee: Gaspar Molina

9 May 2009 2nd leg	Marathón	1–3	Real España	San Pedro Sula, Cortés
19:30	Núñez 44'		37' 41' Caetano; 82' Palacios	Attendance: 6,520; Referee: Marlon Muñoz

- Real España won 6–2 on aggregate.

==== Final ====
1st seeded	Agg.	2nd seeded	1st leg	2nd leg
Olimpia	4–3	Real España	2–2	2–1

16 May 2009 1st leg	Real España	2–2	Olimpia	San Pedro Sula, Cortés
19:30	Vallecillo 8'; Caetano 70'		51' Bruschi; 80' Cigogna	Attendance: 7,216; Referee: Benigno Pineda

24 May 2009 2nd leg	Olimpia	2–1 (a.e.t.)	Real España	Tegucigalpa, Francisco Morazán
16:00	Bruschi 44' de Souza 100'		86' Valladares	Stadium: Estadio Tiburcio Carías Andino; Attendance: 28,355; Referee: Ricardo Zelaya

- Olimpia won 4–3 on aggregate.

2008–09 Clausura champion
Olimpia
22nd National title

Marathon is classified as HON1 for the 2009–10 CONCACAF Champions League, due to their tiebreaker over Olimpia (higher goal differential since both teams had a total of 66 points). Olimpia gets HON2. Real Espana gets HON3, being the only runner-up to short tournaments in the 2008–2009 Honduran National Football League season.

=== Top goalscorers ===
As of 24 May 2009

10 goals

- (Argentina) Sergio Diduch (Hispano)

6 goals

- (Honduras) Bani Lozano (Platense)
- (Honduras) Milton Núñez (Marathón)
- (Honduras) Wilmer Velásquez (Olimpia)
- (Brazil) Douglas Caetano (Real España)
- (Uruguay) Ramiro Bruschi (Olimpia)

5 goals

- (Brazil) Ney Costa (Deportes Savio)
- (Honduras) Héctor Flores (Real Juventud)
- (Honduras) Mitchel Brown (Marathón)
- (Honduras) Allan Lalín (Real España)
- (Colombia) Mauricio Copete (Victoria)

4 goals

- (Honduras) Jerry Palacios (Marathón)
- (Honduras) José Güity (Vida)
- (Honduras) Saul Martínez (Marathón)
- (Costa Rica) Erick Scott (Marathón)
- (Honduras) Carlos Will Mejía (Marathón)
- (Honduras) Osman Chávez (Platense) (2 o.g.)

3 goals

- (Honduras) Luis Ramírez (Marathón)
- (Honduras) Adán Ramírez (Platense)
- (Honduras) Oscar Zepeda (Deportes Savio)
- (Brazil) Marcelo Cabrita (Platense)
- (Honduras) Carlos Morán (Victoria)
- (Honduras) Jorge Lozano (Deportes Savio)
- (Brazil) Edmilson Da Silva (Real España)
- (Colombia) Charles Córdoba (Real Juventud)
- (Honduras) Wilson Güity (Victoria)
- (Honduras) Henry Martínez (Real España)
- (Honduras) Marvin Chávez (Marathón)
- (Argentina) Daniel Cicogna (Olimpia)
- (Uruguay) Guillermo Díaz (Motagua) (2 o.g.)
- (Honduras) Milton Palacios Suazo (Marathón) (1 o.g.)

2 goals

- (Honduras) Víctor Arzú (Victoria)
- (Honduras) Rony Paz (Real Juventud)
- (Uruguay) Oscar Torlacoff (Motagua)
- (Honduras) Carlos Pavón (Real España)
- (Honduras) Milton Ruiz (Hispano)
- (Honduras) Shannon Welcome (Motagua)
- (Honduras) Harrison Róchez (Deportes Savio)
- (Honduras) Georgie Welcome (Motagua)
- (Honduras) Mario Martínez (Real España)
- (Honduras) Walter Hernández (Olimpia)
- (Honduras) Hendry Thomas (Olimpia)
- (Honduras) Pedro Fernández (Victoria)
- (Honduras) Johnny Calderón (Olimpia)
- (Honduras) Carlos Navarro (Real Juventud)
- (Honduras) Sergio Antúnez (Vida)
- (Honduras) Mario Beata (Marathón)
- (Honduras) Jaime Rosales (Olimpia)
- (Honduras) Roger Rojas (Olimpia)
- (Honduras) Brayan Beckele (Vida)
- (Honduras) Facundo Argüello (Vida)
- (Brazil) Fábio de Souza Loureiro (Olimpia)
- (Honduras) Melvin Valladares (Real España)
- (Honduras) Fabio Ulloa (Real Juventud) (1 o.g.)

1 goal

- (Honduras) Quiarol Arzú (Platense)
- (Brazil) Carlos Dias (Real España)
- (Honduras) Eliu Membreño (Hispano)
- (Honduras) Abner Méndez (Hispano)
- (Honduras) Walter Williams (Vida)
- (Honduras) Luis Santamaría (Vida)
- (Honduras) Juan Manuel Cárcamo (Victoria)
- (Honduras) Oscar Vargas (Vida)
- (Argentina) Marcelo Segales (Victoria)
- (Honduras) Carlos Solórzano (Vida)
- (Argentina) Franco Sosa (Marathón)
- (Honduras) Julio Ocampo (Real Juventud)
- (Honduras) Víctor Ortiz (Victoria)
- (Honduras) Ninrod Medina (Victoria)
- (Honduras) Mario Berríos (Marathón)
- (Honduras) Misael Ruiz (Platense)
- (Honduras) Carlos Cruz (Motagua)
- (Honduras) Eder Delgado (Real España)
- (Honduras) Efraín Flores (Platense)
- (Honduras) Ian Osorio (Platense)
- (Honduras) Gabriel Hernández (Platense)
- (Honduras) Emil Martínez (Marathón)
- (Honduras) David Molina (Motagua)
- (Honduras) Ramón Castillo (Real España)
- (Honduras) Diktmar Hernández (Victoria)
- (Honduras) Mario Gómez (Victoria)
- (Honduras) Leonardo Isaula (Motagua)
- (Honduras) Mario Chávez (Vida)
- (Honduras) Anael Figueroa (Deportes Savio)
- (Honduras) Edgar Ferreira (Vida)
- (Honduras) Mariano Acevedo (Marathón)
- (Honduras) Máximo Arzú (Hispano)
- (Honduras) Irvin Guerrero (Platense)
- (Honduras) Erick Norales (Marathón)
- (Honduras) Jerry Bengtson (Vida)
- (Honduras) Henry Jiménez (Hispano)
- (Honduras) José Luis Palacios (Hispano)
- (Honduras) Christian Altamirano (Deportes Savio)
- (Uruguay) Mauricio Weber (Victoria)
- (Honduras) Mauricio Sabillón (Marathón)
- (Honduras) Daniel Lloyd (Motagua)
- (Honduras) Rubén Rivera (Motagua)
- (Belize) Elroy Smith (Deportes Savio)
- (Honduras) Emilio Izaguirre (Motagua)
- (Honduras) Carlos Salinas (Vida)
- (Honduras) Carlos Discua (Victoria)
- (Honduras) Elkin González (Real España)
- (Honduras) Carlos Palacios (Real España)
- (Honduras) Danilo Turcios (Olimpia)
- (Honduras) Erick Vallecillo (Real España)
- (Mexico) Juan Carlos García (Marathón) (o.g.)
- (Honduras) Johnny Salgado (Hispano) (o.g.)

== Aggregate table ==
Pos	Team	Pld	W	D	L	GF	GA	GD	Pts	Qualification or relegation
1	Real España	36	18	12	6	53	30	+23	68 (Note: Real España +2 points.)	Qualified to 2009–10 CONCACAF Champions League
2	Marathón	36	19	9	8	68	43	+25	66	Qualified to 2009–10 CONCACAF Champions League
3	Olimpia	36	19	9	8	43	27	+16	66	Qualified to 2009–10 CONCACAF Champions League
4	Motagua	36	13	10	13	37	42	−5	49	
5	Deportes Savio	36	13	10	13	41	40	+1	48 (Note: Deportes Savio −1 point.)	
6	Victoria	36	12	11	13	46	48	−2	47	
7	Platense	35	10	11	14	43	51	−8	41	
8	Hispano	35	10	6	19	49	65	−16	36	
9	Vida	36	7	14	15	29	45	−16	35	
10	Real Juventud	36	7	10	19	28	45	−17	31	Relegation to the 2009–10 Liga de Ascenso (Note: C.D. Real Juventud relegated to Liga de Ascenso, however they bought Atlético Gualala's franchise and stayed in Liga Nacional for next season.)

Updated to match(es) played on 2 May 2009. Source:
