= 2010–11 Honduran Liga Nacional =

Liga Nacional
- Season: 2010–11
- Champions: Apertura: Real España; Clausura: Motagua
- Relegated: Hispano
- Champions League: Real España; Motagua; Olimpia
- Matches: 192
- Goals: 493 (2.57 per match)
- Top goalscorer: Apertura: Jerry Bengtson (12); Clausura: Jerry Bengtson (15)
- Biggest home win: Olimpia 6–0 Hispano (7 March 2011)
- Biggest away win: Hispano 1–4 Olimpia (10 October 2010)
- Highest scoring: Vida 5–3 Deportes Savio (23 January 2011)
- Longest unbeaten run: Olimpia (12)
- Longest losing run: Victoria (8)
- All statistics correct as of 15 May 2011.

The 2010–11 season in Honduran Liga Nacional was divided into two tournaments (Apertura and Clausura) and determined the 57th and 58th champions in the history of the league. It also provided two berths for the 2011–12 CONCACAF Champions League. The league had a reserve tournament for the first time in history with players between 15 and 20 years old.

== 2010–11 teams ==
Location of teams in 2010–11 season

| Deportes Savio | Hispano | Marathón | Motagua | Necaxa (promoted) |
| Olimpia | Platense | Real España | Victoria | Vida |

- C.D. Necaxa is from Tegucigalpa but will play their home games at Danlí.
- Real C.D. España is from San Pedro Sula but played their home games at Choloma for the Apertura tournament.

== Team information ==
| Team | Stadium | Capacity | Manager | Captain | Shirt Manufacturer | Main Shirt Sponsor |
|---|---|---|---|---|---|---|
| Marathón | Olímpico Metropolitano | 40,000 | (Honduras) Edwin Pavón | (Honduras) Mario Berríos | Joma | Banco Continental |
| Motagua | Tiburcio Carías Andino | 35,000 | (Honduras) Ramón Maradiaga | (Honduras) Amado Guevara | Joma | Pepsi |
| Olimpia | Tiburcio Carías Andino | 35,000 | (Colombia) Carlos Restrepo | (Honduras) Danilo Turcios | Puma | Coca-Cola |
| Real España | Francisco Morazán^{1} | 20,000 | (Argentina) Mario Zanabria | (Honduras) Alfredo Mejía | Lotto | Respuestos de Atlántida |
| Victoria | Nilmo Edwards | 25,000 | (Honduras) Jorge Pineda | (Honduras) Júnior Izaguirre | | Leyde |
| Vida | Nilmo Edwards | 25,000 | (Honduras) Carlos Martínez | (Honduras) Bryan Beckeles | Joma | Leyde |
| Hispano | Carlos Miranda | 10,000 | (Honduras) Raúl Martínez Sambulá | (Argentina) Pablo Genovese | Kaiser | Tigo |
| Platense | Excélsior | 10,000 | (Argentina) Héctor Vargas | (Honduras) Juan Cárcamo | Joma | |
| Necaxa | Marcelo Tinoco | 5,000 | (Honduras) Jorge Jiménez | | Puma | CONGOLON |
| Deportes Savio | Sergio Antonio Reyes | 5,000 | (Honduras) Hernán García | | Kaiser | Tigo |

- ^{1} Due to disputes with the city, Real España played its home games in Choloma and Puerto Cortés during the Apertura tournament.

== Apertura ==
The Apertura tournament started on 7 August 2010 at Estadio Nilmo Edwards in La Ceiba with the game between Vida and Real España.

=== Regular season ===
==== Standings ====
| Pos | Team | Pld | W | D | L | GF | GA | GD | Pts | Qualification or relegation |
|---|---|---|---|---|---|---|---|---|---|---|
| 1 | Victoria | 18 | 10 | 2 | 6 | 26 | 24 | +2 | 32 | Qualified to the Final round |
| 2 | Marathón | 18 | 8 | 7 | 3 | 26 | 18 | +8 | 31 | Qualified to the Final round |
| 3 | Real España | 18 | 7 | 8 | 3 | 28 | 22 | +6 | 29 | Qualified to the Final round |
| 4 | Olimpia | 18 | 7 | 7 | 4 | 29 | 19 | +10 | 28 | Qualified to the Final round |
| 5 | Platense | 18 | 8 | 2 | 8 | 20 | 22 | −2 | 26 | |
| 6 | Vida | 18 | 7 | 4 | 7 | 26 | 23 | +3 | 25 | |
| 7 | Motagua | 18 | 5 | 6 | 7 | 21 | 25 | −4 | 21 | |
| 8 | Deportes Savio | 18 | 5 | 6 | 7 | 22 | 30 | −8 | 21 | |
| 9 | Necaxa | 18 | 5 | 4 | 9 | 18 | 19 | −1 | 19 | |
| 10 | Hispano | 18 | 3 | 4 | 11 | 17 | 31 | −14 | 13 | |

Updated to match(es) played on 20 November 2010. Source:

==== Results ====
As of 20 November 2010

| Home \ Away | SAV | HIS | MAR | MOT | NEC | OLI | PLA | RES | VIC | VID |
|---|---|---|---|---|---|---|---|---|---|---|
| Deportes Savio | | 1–0 | 0–2 | 2–2 | 2–1 | 1–1 | 3–1 | 0–0 | 1–0 | 2–1 |
| Hispano | 0–0 | | 2–2 | 2–0 | 0–0 | 1–4 | 1–2 | 1–3 | 2–3 | 1–0 |
| Marathón | 1–1 | 0–2 | | 1–0 | 0–0 | 1–0 | 1–0 | 0–0 | 5–1 | 0–0 |
| Motagua | 1–0 | 2–2 | 3–2 | | 1–0 | 1–2 | 1–0 | 1–1 | 3–0 | 0–2 |
| Necaxa | 3–1 | 3–0 | 0–1 | 3–0 | | 0–1 | 2–1 | 1–1 | 0–2 | 1–2 |
| Olimpia | 5–2 | 2–0 | 2–2 | 1–1 | 1–1 | | 2–0 | 2–2 | 1–2 | 1–0 |
| Platense | 2–0 | 2–0 | 2–2 | 2–1 | 1–0 | 1–0 | | 1–2 | 2–1 | 0–2 |
| Real España | 3–3 | 1–0 | 3–2 | 1–1 | 1–2 | 2–1 | 2–2 | | 1–2 | 1–0 |
| Victoria | 3–1 | 2–1 | 0–1 | 2–1 | 1–0 | 1–1 | 2–0 | 2–1 | | 1–2 |
| Vida | 4–2 | 4–2 | 2–3 | 2–2 | 2–1 | 1–1 | 0–1 | 1–3 | 1–1 | |

Source: Soccerway
Legend: Blue = home team win; Yellow = draw; Red = away team win.

=== Final round ===
==== Semifinals ====
===== Victoria vs Olimpia =====
24 November 2010
19:30 (UTC−06:00)

| Olimpia | 2–0 | Victoria |
|---|---|---|
| Hernández 79'; Güity 90+1' | Report |

Estadio Tiburcio Carías Andino
Tegucigalpa
Attendance: 7,387
Referee: Geovany Mendoza

| Olimpia | Victoria |

| GK | 27 | (Honduras) Noel Valladares |
| DF | 5 | (Honduras) Wilfredo Barahona | Red card |
| DF | 22 | (Honduras) Frank Arévalo |
| DF | 4 | (Brazil) Fábio de Souza |
| DF | 32 | (Honduras) Boniek García |
| DF | 7 | (Honduras) Bani Lozano |
| MF | 12 | (Honduras) Miguel Castillo | Substituted off |
| MF | 20 | (Honduras) Walter Hernández |
| FW | 23 | (Brazil) Carlos Dias |
| FW | 17 | (Colombia) Mauricio Copete | Substituted off |
| FW | 33 | (Uruguay) Ramiro Bruschi | Substituted off |
Substitutions:
| MF | 10 | (Honduras) Danilo Turcios | Substituted on | Yellow card |
| FW | 21 | (Honduras) Roger Rojas | Substituted on |
| FW | 18 | (Honduras) Franco Güity | Substituted on | Yellow card |
Manager:
(Colombia) Carlos Restrepo

| GK | 1 | (Honduras) Ricardo Canales |
| DF | 4 | (Honduras) Júnior Izaguirre | Yellow card |
| DF | 6 | (Honduras) Ninrrol Medina |
| DF | – | (Honduras) Víctor Mena |
| DF | 25 | (Honduras) Wilmer Crisanto | Yellow card |
| MF | – | (Honduras) Samir Arzú |
| DF | 12 | (Honduras) David Velásquez |
| MF | 21 | (Honduras) Pedro Fernández | Yellow card |
| – | – | (Honduras) Félix Crisanto | Yellow card |
| FW | 29 | (Honduras) Víctor Ortiz |
| FW | 11 | (Honduras) Elmer Zelaya | Substituted off |
Substitutions:
| FW | 9 | (Honduras) Saul Martínez | Substituted on |
Manager:
(Honduras) Jorge Pineda

27 November 2010
19:30 (UTC−06:00)

| Victoria | 0–1 | Olimpia |
|---|---|---|
| | Report | Bruschi 38' |

Estadio Nilmo Edwards
La Ceiba
Attendance: 5,308
Referee: Mario Moncada

| Victoria | Olimpia |

| GK | 1 | (Honduras) Ricardo Canales |
| DF | 4 | (Honduras) Júnior Izaguirre |
| DF | – | (Honduras) Víctor Mena |
| DF | 20 | (Honduras) Carlos Oliva | Substituted off |
| DF | 8 | (Honduras) Carlos Morán | Substituted off |
| DF | – | (Honduras) Juan Róchez | Substituted off |
| DF | 25 | (Honduras) Wilmer Crisanto | Yellow card |
| MF | 21 | (Honduras) Pedro Fernández | Yellow card |
| DF | 12 | (Honduras) David Velásquez | Yellow card |
| FW | 9 | (Honduras) Saul Martínez |
| FW | 29 | (Honduras) Víctor Ortiz |
Substitutions:
| FW | 11 | (Honduras) Elmer Zelaya | Substituted on |
| MF | – | (Honduras) Samir Arzú | Substituted on |
| FW | – | (Brazil) Bruno Rego | Substituted on |
Manager:
(Honduras) Jorge Pineda

| GK | 27 | (Honduras) Noel Valladares |
| DF | 30 | (Honduras) Johnny Palacios |
| DF | 22 | (Honduras) Frank Arévalo |
| DF | 4 | (Brazil) Fábio de Souza |
| DF | 32 | (Honduras) Boniek García |
| DF | 7 | (Honduras) Bani Lozano |
| MF | 22 | (Honduras) Reynaldo Tilguath | Substituted off |
| MF | 20 | (Honduras) Walter Hernández |
| FW | 23 | (Brazil) Carlos Días | Substituted off | Yellow card |
| FW | 17 | (Colombia) Mauricio Copete |
| FW | 33 | (Uruguay) Ramiro Bruschi | Substituted off |
Substitutions:
| FW | 21 | (Honduras) Roger Rojas | Substituted on |
| MF | 12 | (Honduras) Miguel Castillo | Substituted on |
| FW | 18 | (Honduras) Francisco Güity | Substituted on |
Manager:
(Colombia) Carlos Restrepo

- Olimpia won 3–0 on aggregate score.

===== Marathón vs Real España =====
25 November 2010
19:30 (UTC−06:00)

| Real España | 2–2 | Marathón |
|---|---|---|
| Bica 11'; Lobo 17' | Report | Diamond 24'; Valladares 45' |

Estadio Francisco Morazán
San Pedro Sula
Attendance: 10,711
Referee: Wilson Matute

| Real España | Marathón |

| GK | – | (Uruguay) Marcelo Macías | (substituted off) 85' |
| DF | – | (Uruguay) Sergio Bica | (substituted off) 85' |
| DF | – | (Honduras) Daniel Tejeda |
| DF | – | (Honduras) Yobani Avila |
| DF | – | (Honduras) Maynor Martínez | Yellow card |
| MF | 20 | (Honduras) Alfredo Mejía |
| MF | – | (Honduras) Eder Delgado |
| MF | – | (Honduras) Mario Martínez |
| MF | – | (Honduras) Luis Lobo |
| MF | – | (Honduras) Eddy Vega | (substituted off) 46' |
| MF | – | (Brazil) Douglas Mattoso |
Substitutions:
| FW | 24 | (Honduras) Christian Martínez | (substituted on) 46' |
| GK | 36 | (Honduras) Kevin Hernández | (substituted on) 85' |
| DF | – | (Honduras) Hilder Colón | (substituted on) 85' |
Manager:
(Argentina) Mario Zanabria

| GK | 1 | (Belize) Shane Orio |
| DF | 5 | (Honduras) Erick Norales |
| DF | 25 | (Honduras) Luis Santamaría |
| DF | 15 | (Honduras) Carlos Palacios |
| DF | 23 | (Honduras) Elder Valladares |
| MF | 12 | (Honduras) Mariano Acevedo | (substituted off) 73' |
| MF | 8 | (Honduras) Reinieri Mayorquín | Yellow card |
| MF | 19 | (Honduras) Mario Berríos | (substituted off) 90' |
| MF | 7 | (Honduras) Carlos Mejía |
| FW | 11 | (Honduras) Randy Diamond | (substituted off) 79' |
| FW | 20 | (Honduras) Rony Flores |
Substitutions:
| MF | 14 | (Honduras) Orvin Paz | (substituted on) 73' |
| FW | 9 | (Uruguay) Claudio Cardozo | (substituted on) 79' |
| FW | 10 | (Argentina) Héctor Amarilla | (substituted on) 90' |
Manager:
(Honduras) Edwin Pavón

28 November 2010
15:00 (UTC−06:00)

| Marathón | 0–2 | Real España |
|---|---|---|
| | Report | Lobo 17' 54' |

Estadio Yankel Rosenthal
San Pedro Sula
Attendance: 3,958
Referee: Héctor Rodríguez

| Marathón | Real España |

| GK | 1 | (Belize) Shane Orio |
| DF | 25 | (Honduras) Luis Santamaría | Yellow card |
| DF | 23 | (Honduras) Elder Valladares |
| DF | 5 | (Honduras) Erick Norales |
| DF | 15 | (Honduras) Carlos Palacios |
| MF | 7 | (Honduras) Carlos Mejía |
| MF | 8 | (Honduras) Reinieri Mayorquín | Yellow card |
| MF | 19 | (Honduras) Mario Berríos |
| MF | 12 | (Honduras) Mariano Acevedo |
| FW | 11 | (Honduras) Randy Diamond | Yellow card |
| FW | 20 | (Honduras) Rony Flores |
Substitutions:
| MF | 18 | (Honduras) Milton Palacios | (substituted on) 54' |
| FW | 9 | (Uruguay) Claudio Cardozo | (substituted on) 64' |
| MF | 14 | (Honduras) Orvin Paz | (substituted on) 68' |
Manager:
(Honduras) Edwin Pavón

| GK | 36 | (Honduras) Kevin Hernández |
| DF | – | (Honduras) Yobani Avila |
| DF | 33 | (Honduras) Daniel Tejeda |
| DF | – | (Uruguay) Sergio Bica | Yellow card |
| DF | – | (Honduras) Maynor Martínez |
| MF | 26 | (Honduras) Eder Delgado |
| MF | 20 | (Honduras) Alfredo Mejía | Yellow card |
| MF | – | (Honduras) Mario Martínez |
| FW | 6 | (Honduras) Jairo Puerto | Yellow card |
| FW | 29 | (Honduras) Luis Lobo |
| FW | 11 | (Brazil) Douglas Mattoso | Yellow card |
Substitutions:
| MF | 12 | (Honduras) Gerson Rodas | (substituted on) 46' |
| DF | 17 | (Honduras) Hilder Colón | (substituted on) 50' |
| FW | 38 | (Honduras) Henry Martínez | (substituted on) 82' | Yellow card |
Manager:
(Argentina) Mario Zanabria

- Real España won 4–2 on aggregate score.

==== Final ====
===== Real España vs Olimpia =====
5 December 2010
16:00 (UTC−06:00)

| Olimpia | 1–1 | Real España |
|---|---|---|
| Días 7' | Report | Lobo 4' |

Estadio Tiburcio Carías Andino
Tegucigalpa
Attendance: 16,964
Referee: Wilson Matute

| Olimpia | Real España |

| GK | 27 | (Honduras) Noel Valladares |
| DF | 4 | (Brazil) Fábio de Souza |
| DF | 6 | (Honduras) Juan García |
| DF | 7 | (Honduras) Bani Lozano |
| DF | 30 | (Honduras) Johnny Palacios | Yellow card |
| DF | 32 | (Honduras) Boniek García |
| MF | 22 | (Honduras) Reynaldo Tilguath |
| MF | 20 | (Honduras) Walter Hernández | (red card) 90' |
| FW | 21 | (Honduras) Roger Rojas | (substituted off) 82' |
| FW | 23 | (Brazil) Carlos Días | (substituted off) 43' |
| FW | 17 | (Colombia) Mauricio Copete | (substituted off) 72' | Yellow card |
Substitutions:
| MF | 19 | (Honduras) Danilo Turcios | (substituted on) 43' |
| FW | 18 | (Honduras) Francisco Güity | (substituted on) 72' |
| FW | 31 | (Honduras) Erick Andino | (substituted on) 82' | Yellow card |
Manager:
(Colombia) Carlos Restrepo

| GK | 22 | (Uruguay) Marcelo Macías |
| DF | – | (Uruguay) Sergio Bica | Yellow card |
| DF | – | (Honduras) Maynor Martínez | Yellow card |
| DF | 33 | (Honduras) Daniel Tejeda |
| DF | – | (Honduras) Yobani Ávila | (substituted off) 86' | Yellow card |
| MF | – | (Honduras) Mario Martínez |
| MF | 12 | (Honduras) Gerson Rodas | (substituted off) 68' |
| MF | 20 | (Honduras) Alfredo Mejía |
| MF | 26 | (Honduras) Eder Delgado |
| FW | 29 | (Honduras) Luis Lobo | (substituted off) 81' |
| FW | 11 | (Brazil) Caetano |
Substitutions:
| FW | 6 | (Honduras) Jairo Puerto | (substituted on) 68' |
| MF | 16 | (Honduras) Juan Acevedo | (substituted on) 81' |
| DF | 17 | (Honduras) Hilder Colón | (substituted on) 86' | (red card) 90' |
Manager:
(Argentina) Mario Zanabria

11 December 2010
19:30 (UTC−06:00)

| Real España | 2–1 (a.e.t.) | Olimpia |
|---|---|---|
| Martínez 87'; Caetano 111' | Report | Bruschi 71' |

Estadio Francisco Morazán
San Pedro Sula
Attendance: 17,197
Referee: Benigno Pineda

| Real España | Olimpia |

| GK | 22 | (Uruguay) Marcelo Macías |
| DF | 33 | (Honduras) Daniel Tejeda |
| DF | – | (Uruguay) Sergio Bica |
| DF | – | (Honduras) Maynor Martínez | (yellow card) 45+2' |
| DF | – | (Honduras) Yobani Ávila | (yellow card) 78' |
| MF | 12 | (Honduras) Gerson Rodas | (yellow card) 24' | (substituted off) 65' |
| MF | 26 | (Honduras) Eder Delgado |
| MF | – | (Honduras) Mario Martínez | (substituted off) 83' |
| MF | 20 | (Honduras) Alfredo Mejía |
| FW | 29 | (Honduras) Luis Lobo |
| FW | 11 | (Brazil) Caetano |
Substitutions:
| MF | 8 | (Uruguay) Julio Rodríguez | (substituted on) 65' |
| FW | 24 | (Honduras) Christian Martínez | (substituted on) 80' |
| FW | 6 | (Honduras) Jairo Puerto | (substituted on) 83' |
Manager:
(Argentina) Mario Zanabria

| GK | 27 | (Honduras) Noel Valladares |
| DF | 32 | (Honduras) Boniek García |
| DF | 4 | (Brazil) Fábio de Souza |
| DF | 30 | (Honduras) Johnny Palacios | (yellow card) 23' |
| DF | 5 | (Honduras) Wilfredo Barahona |
| DF | 7 | (Honduras) Bani Lozano |
| DF | 6 | (Honduras) Juan García | (red card) 78' |
| MF | 22 | (Honduras) Reynaldo Tilguath | (yellow card) 78' | (substituted off) 96' |
| MF | 12 | (Honduras) Miguel Castillo | Yellow card |
| FW | 17 | (Colombia) Mauricio Copete | (substituted off) 80' |
| FW | 33 | (Uruguay) Ramiro Bruschi | (substituted off) 85' |
Substitutions:
| MF | 16 | (Honduras) Alexander López | (substituted on) 80' |
| FW | 18 | (Honduras) Francisco Güity | (substituted on) 85' | (red card) 107' |
| MF | 19 | (Honduras) Danilo Turcios | (substituted on) 96' |
Manager:
(Colombia) Carlos Restrepo

- Real España won 3–2 on aggregate score.

Liga Nacional
2010–11 Apertura champion

10th title

=== Top goalscorers ===
As of 11 December 2010

- 12 goals:

(Honduras) Jerry Bengtson (Vida)

- 11 goals:

(Honduras) Saul Martínez (Victoria)

- 9 goals:

(Honduras) Rony Flores (Marathón)
(Brazil) Douglas Mattoso (Real España)

- 8 goals:

(Belize) Elroy Smith (Deportes Savio)
(Honduras) Luis Lobo (Real España)
(Uruguay) Ramiro Bruschi (Olimpia)

- 7 goals:

(Honduras) Rubén Licona (Necaxa)

- 6 goals:

(Honduras) Randy Diamond (Marathón)
(Brazil) Carlos Días (Olimpia)

- 5 goals:

(Honduras) Héctor Flores (Hispano)
(Honduras) Georgie Welcome (Motagua)

- 4 goals:

(Honduras) Mario Martínez (Real España)
(Honduras) Milton Ruiz (Vida)
(Colombia) Mauricio Copete (Olimpia)
(Honduras) Pompilio Cacho (Hispano)
(Argentina) Christian Pereira (Platense)
(Honduras) Christian Martínez (Real España)
(Honduras) Michel Rivera (Platense)
(Honduras) Luis Rodas (Necaxa)

- 3 goals:

(Brazil) Edilson Pereira (Deportes Savio)
(Honduras) Yobani Avila (Real España)
(Honduras) Víctor Ortiz (Victoria)
(Honduras) Roger Rojas (Olimpia)
(Honduras) Elmer Zelaya (Victoria)
(Brazil) Marcelo Lopes (Platense)
(Honduras) Juan Mejía (Deportes Savio)
(Honduras) Juan Cárcamo (Platense)

- 2 goals:

(Honduras) Rubén Matamoros (Necaxa)
(Uruguay) Claudio Cardozo (Marathón)
(Honduras) Maynor Martínez (Real España)
(Honduras) Víctor Morales (Hispano)
(Honduras) Francisco Pavón (Vida)
(Honduras) José Velásquez (Victoria)
(Honduras) Boniek García (Olimpia)
(Honduras) Luis Guzmán (Motagua)
(Uruguay) Sergio Bica (Real España)
(Honduras) Carlos Solórzano (Deportes Savio)
(Honduras) Jorge Claros (Motagua)
(Honduras) Orvin Paz (Marathón)
(Honduras) Alexander López (Olimpia)
(Honduras) Shannon Welcome (Motagua)
(Argentina) Héctor Amarilla (Marathón)
(Uruguay) Oscar Torlacoff (Hispano)
(Honduras) Reynaldo Tilguath (Olimpia)
(Honduras) Samir Arzú (Victoria)
(Honduras) Alfredo Mejía (Real España)
(Honduras) Edder Delgado (Real España)
(Honduras) Amado Guevara (Motagua)
(Belize) Harrison Róches (Platense)
(Honduras) Danilo Turcios (Olimpia)
(Belize) Deon McCauley (Deportes Savio)
(Honduras) Walter Hernández (Olimpia)

- 1 goal:

(Honduras) Romell Quioto (Vida)
(Honduras) David Meza (Platense)
(Brazil) Marcelo dos Santos (Motagua)
(Colombia) Luis Castro (Vida)
(Honduras) Julián Rápalo (Deportes Savio)
(Honduras) Brayan Beckeles (Vida)
(Honduras) Mario Berríos (Marathón)
(Honduras) Carlos Mejía (Marathón)
(Honduras) Oscar Durón (Necaxa)
(Honduras) Carlos Morán (Victoria)
(Honduras) Wilmer Crisanto (Victoria)
(Honduras) Mariano Acevedo (Marathón)
(Honduras) Alexander Aguilar (Platense)
(Honduras) Angel Hill (Hispano)
(Brazil) Bruno da Silva (Victoria)
(Honduras) Jorge Lozano (Vida)
(Belize) Elroy Kuylen (Platense)
(Honduras) Víctor Mena (Victoria)
(Honduras) Marvin Sánchez (Vida)
(Honduras) Fabio Ulloa (Necaxa)
(Honduras) Edwin Salvador (Necaxa)
(Honduras) Léster Macías (Hispano)
(Honduras) Bani Lozano (Olimpia)
(Honduras) Aly Arriola (Motagua)
(Honduras) Rommel Murillo (Vida)
(Honduras) Dixon Mauricio (Necaxa)
(Honduras) Franco Güity (Olimpia)
(Honduras) Elder Valladares (Marathón)
(Honduras) Jesús Navas (Necaxa)
(Argentina) Pablo Genovese (Hispano)
(Honduras) Quiarol Arzú (Platense)
(Colombia) Charles Córdoba (Motagua)
(Honduras) Roger Mondragón (Motagua)
(Honduras) Francisco López (Deportes Savio)
(Honduras) Carlos Navarro (Hispano)
(Brazil) Ney Costa (Deportes Savio)
(Honduras) Milton Palacios (Marathón)
(Honduras) Jairo Crisanto (Victoria)
(Honduras) Vicente Solórzano (Deportes Savio)
(Honduras) Gustavo Alvarado (Motagua)
(Honduras) Johnny Leverón (Motagua)

- 1 own-goal:

(Honduras) Johny Galdámez (Deportes Savio)
(Uruguay) Sergio Bica (Real España)
(Honduras) Erick Norales (Marathón)
(Belize) Elroy Smith (Deportes Savio)
(Honduras) Francisco Díaz (Platense)
(Honduras) Angel Hill (Hispano)
(Honduras) Luis Mercado (Hispano)

== Clausura ==
The Clausura tournament started on 15 January 2011 with the game between reigning champions Real C.D. España who played against C.D.S. Vida. The game ended with an unexpected 0–1 home defeat for Real España; Pompilio Cacho scored the first goal of the season.
On 16 March 2011, the league decided to switch rounds 14 and 15, thereby the local derbies from 26–27 March don't interfere with the Honduras national football team fixtures.
On 9 April 2011, C.D. Olimpia ensured its participation in the semifinals after defeating C.D. Marathón 0–1 at Estadio Francisco Morazán; C.D. Motagua did it on 17 April 2011 in La Ceiba against C.D. Victoria with a 1–2 away victory; and on the very last round, C.D.S. Vida and Marathón also joined to face C.D. Motagua and C.D. Olimpia on the semifinals respectively. On 30 April 2011, C.D. Motagua earned a ticket to the Final after a 3–3 draw on aggregate against C.D.S. Vida; C.D. Olimpia qualified against C.D. Marathón one day later. As a result, the contenders of the Honduran Superclásico faced each other again for the sixth time in a Final series in the history of the league. Motagua rectified its good performance and with a 5–3 aggregate score defeated its main rival and obtained its 12th league title.

Real España, Motagua and Olimpia earned berths to the 2011–12 CONCACAF Champions League.

=== Regular season ===
==== Standings ====
| Pos | Team | Pld | W | D | L | GF | GA | GD | Pts | Qualification or relegation |
|---|---|---|---|---|---|---|---|---|---|---|
| 1 | Olimpia | 18 | 9 | 6 | 3 | 24 | 11 | +13 | 33 | Qualified to the Final round |
| 2 | Motagua | 18 | 8 | 7 | 3 | 25 | 17 | +8 | 31 | Qualified to the Final round |
| 3 | Vida | 18 | 7 | 5 | 6 | 23 | 18 | +5 | 26 | Qualified to the Final round |
| 4 | Marathón | 18 | 7 | 4 | 7 | 21 | 17 | +4 | 25 | Qualified to the Final round |
| 5 | Real España | 18 | 6 | 7 | 5 | 25 | 25 | 0 | 25 | |
| 6 | Necaxa | 18 | 5 | 9 | 4 | 25 | 24 | +1 | 24 | |
| 7 | Hispano | 18 | 5 | 9 | 4 | 16 | 18 | −2 | 24 | |
| 8 | Deportes Savio | 18 | 5 | 5 | 8 | 25 | 36 | −11 | 20 | |
| 9 | Platense | 18 | 4 | 5 | 9 | 21 | 29 | −8 | 17 | |
| 10 | Victoria | 18 | 3 | 5 | 10 | 25 | 35 | −10 | 14 | |

Updated to match(es) played on 20 April 2011. Source:

==== Results ====
As of 20 April 2011

| Home \ Away | SAV | HIS | MAR | MOT | NEC | OLI | PLA | RES | VIC | VID |
|---|---|---|---|---|---|---|---|---|---|---|
| Deportes Savio | | 1–0 | 2–1 | 3–3 | 2–2 | 0–0 | 4–2 | 3–3 | 2–1 | 1–0 |
| Hispano | 2–0 | | 0–0 | 0–0 | 2–0 | 1–0 | 1–0 | 2–3 | 2–1 | 0–0 |
| Marathón | 1–0 | 2–1 | | 0–1 | 2–2 | 0–1 | 0–1 | 2–0 | 3–0 | 2–1 |
| Motagua | 4–1 | 0–0 | 1–0 | | 1–1 | 2–1 | 1–1 | 2–3 | 0–2 | 2–0 |
| Necaxa | 4–0 | 2–2 | 1–0 | 0–1 | | 1–0 | 1–0 | 2–1 | 2–2 | 0–0 |
| Olimpia | 2–1 | 6–0 | 1–1 | 1–1 | 2–0 | | 1–0 | 1–0 | 3–1 | 2–1 |
| Platense | 2–0 | 1–1 | 1–2 | 1–3 | 1–1 | 1–1 | | 0–1 | 2–2 | 2–1 |
| Real España | 1–1 | 1–1 | 2–2 | 2–1 | 2–2 | 0–0 | 2–1 | | 2–3 | 0–1 |
| Victoria | 3–1 | 0–0 | 0–2 | 1–2 | 3–3 | 1–2 | 3–4 | 1–1 | | 0–2 |
| Vida | 5–3 | 1–1 | 2–1 | 0–0 | 3–1 | 0–0 | 4–1 | 0–1 | 2–1 | |

Source: Soccerway
Legend: Blue = home team win; Yellow = draw; Red = away team win.

=== Final round ===
==== Semifinals ====
===== Olimpia vs Marathón =====
28 April 2011
19:30 (UTC−06:00)

| Marathón | 1–0 | Olimpia |
|---|---|---|
| Henríquez 35' | Report |

Estadio Olímpico Metropolitano, San Pedro Sula
Attendance: 9,259
Referee: Héctor Rodríguez

| Marathón | Olimpia |

| GK | 1 | (Belize) Shane Orio | (yellow card) 90+2' |
| DF | 3 | (Honduras) Astor Henríquez | Yellow card |
| DF | 5 | (Honduras) Erick Norales | (substituted off) 18' |
| DF | 23 | (Honduras) Mauricio Sabillón |
| DF | – | (Belize) Elroy Smith |
| MF | 7 | (Honduras) Carlos Mejía | (substituted off) 82' |
| MF | 8 | (Honduras) Reinieri Mayorquín | Yellow card |
| MF | 14 | (Honduras) Orvin Paz | Yellow card |
| MF | 19 | (Honduras) Mario Berríos |
| MF | – | (Honduras) Emil Martínez |
| FW | 20 | (Honduras) Rony Flores | (substituted off) 55' |
Substitutions:
| DF | 15 | (Honduras) Carlos Palacios | (substituted on) 18' | Yellow card |
| FW | 9 | (Uruguay) Claudio Cardozo | (substituted on) 55' | Yellow card |
| FW | 11 | (Honduras) Randy Diamond | (substituted on) 82' |
Manager:
(Honduras) José Herrera

| GK | 28 | (Honduras) Donis Escober |
| DF | 4 | (Brazil) Fábio de Souza | Yellow card |
| DF | 5 | (Honduras) Wilfredo Barahona |
| DF | 6 | (Honduras) Juan García | (yellow card) 86' |
| DF | 30 | (Honduras) Johnny Palacios | (yellow card) 52' |
| DF | – | (Honduras) Johnny Calderón | Yellow card |
| MF | 12 | (Honduras) Miguel Castillo | (yellow card) 53' | (substituted off) 55' |
| MF | 20 | (Honduras) Walter Hernández | Yellow card |
| MF | 32 | (Honduras) Oscar García |
| FW | 18 | (Brazil) Douglas Caetano | (substituted off) 77' |
| FW | 33 | (Uruguay) Ramiro Bruschi | (substituted off) 71' |
Substitutions:
| MF | 19 | (Honduras) Danilo Turcios | (substituted on) 55' |
| FW | 21 | (Honduras) Roger Rojas | (substituted on) 71' |
| FW | 23 | (Brazil) José Dias | (substituted on) 77' |
Manager:
(Honduras) Juan Espinoza

1 May 2011
17:00 (UTC−06:00)

| Olimpia | 1–0 | Marathón |
|---|---|---|
| Henríquez 90+1' (o.g.) | Report |

Estadio Tiburcio Carías Andino
Tegucigalpa
Attendance: 10,802
Referee: Benigno Pineda

| Olimpia | Marathón |

| GK | 27 | (Honduras) Noel Valladares |
| DF | 4 | (Brazil) Fábio de Souza |
| DF | 5 | (Honduras) Wilfredo Barahona | (substituted off) 75' |
| DF | 6 | (Honduras) Juan García |
| DF | 30 | (Honduras) Johnny Palacios |
| MF | 19 | (Honduras) Danilo Turcios |
| MF | 20 | (Honduras) Walter Hernández |
| MF | 22 | (Honduras) Reynaldo Tilguath | (substituted off) 62' |
| MF | 32 | (Honduras) Oscar García | Yellow card |
| FW | 18 | (Brazil) Douglas Caetano | (substituted off) 80' |
| FW | 33 | (Uruguay) Ramiro Bruschi |
Substitutions:
| FW | 23 | (Brazil) José Dias | (substituted on) 62' |
| FW | 9 | (Honduras) Anthony Lozano | (substituted on) 75' |
| FW | 21 | (Honduras) Roger Rojas | (substituted on) 80' |
Manager:
(Honduras) Juan Espinoza

| GK | 1 | (Belize) Shane Orio |
| DF | 3 | (Honduras) Astor Henríquez | Yellow card |
| DF | 15 | (Honduras) Carlos Palacios |
| DF | 23 | (Honduras) Mauricio Sabillón |
| DF | – | (Belize) Elroy Smith |
| MF | 7 | (Honduras) Carlos Mejía | (substituted off) 46' |
| MF | 8 | (Honduras) Reinieri Mayorquín | (yellow card) 24' |
| MF | 14 | (Honduras) Orvin Paz | (yellow card) 18' |
| MF | 19 | (Honduras) Mario Berríos | (substituted off) 87' |
| MF | – | (Honduras) Emil Martínez |
| FW | 9 | (Uruguay) Claudio Cardozo | (substituted off) 77' |
Substitutions:
| MF | 17 | (Honduras) Fernando Castillo | (substituted on) 46' |
| FW | 20 | (Honduras) Rony Flores | (substituted on) 77' |
| DF | 2 | (Honduras) Pastor Martínez | (substituted on) 87' |
Manager:
(Honduras) José Herrera

- Olimpia 1–1 Marathón on aggregate score; Olimpia advanced on better Regular season performance.

===== Motagua vs Vida =====
27 April 2011
19:30 (UTC−06:00)

| Vida | 1–0 | Motagua |
|---|---|---|
| Altamirano 78' | Report |

Estadio Nilmo Edwards, La Ceiba
Attendance: 6,067
Referee: Miguel Torres

| Vida | Motagua |

| GK | 1 | (Uruguay) Kerpo de León |
| DF | 2 | (Colombia) Luis Castro |
| DF | 5 | (Honduras) Brayan Beckeles |
| DF | 13 | (Honduras) Rommel Murillo |
| DF | 21 | (Honduras) Mario Chávez | (substituted off) 65' |
| MF | 8 | (Honduras) Orlin Peralta |
| MF | 12 | (Honduras) Arnold Peralta | Yellow card | (substituted off) 55' |
| MF | 19 | (Argentina) Pablo Genovese |
| MF | – | (Honduras) Javier Portillo |
| FW | 10 | (Brazil) Jocimar Nascimento | Yellow card |
| FW | 28 | (Honduras) Pompilio Cacho | (substituted off) 87' |
Substitutions:
| MF | 30 | (Honduras) Christian Altamirano | (substituted on) 55' | (yellow card) 61' |
| MF | 17 | (Honduras) Francisco Pavón | (substituted on) 65' |
| – | – | Marcelo Canales | (substituted on) 87' |
Manager:
(Honduras) Carlos Martínez

| GK | 22 | (Honduras) Donaldo Morales |
| DF | 4 | (Honduras) Júnior Izaguirre |
| DF | 12 | (Honduras) Iván Guerrero |
| DF | 16 | (Honduras) Johnny Leverón | (yellow card) 61' |
| DF | 23 | (Honduras) Sergio Mendoza | Yellow card |
| MF | 10 | (Honduras) Carlos Morán | (substituted off) 85' |
| MF | 13 | (Honduras) Mario Girón | (substituted off) 46' |
| MF | 20 | (Honduras) Amado Guevara | (substituted off) 59' |
| MF | 21 | (Honduras) Odis Borjas | Yellow card |
| MF | 28 | (Honduras) Adán Ramírez |
| FW | 27 | (Honduras) Jerry Bengtson | Yellow card |
Substitutions:
| MF | 8 | (Honduras) Jorge Claros | (substituted on) 46' |
| MF | 7 | (Guatemala) Guillermo Ramírez | (substituted on) 59' |
| MF | 24 | (Honduras) Omar Elvir | (substituted on) 85' |
Manager:
(Honduras) Ramón Maradiaga

30 April 2011
19:30 (UTC−06:00)

| Motagua | 3–2 | Vida |
|---|---|---|
| Bengtson 41' (pen.); Ramírez 80'; Copete 90+2' | Report | Genovese 58'; Castro 71' |

Estadio Tiburcio Carías Andino
Tegucigalpa
Attendance: 6,836
Referee: Erick Andino

| Motagua | Vida |

| GK | 22 | (Honduras) Donaldo Morales |
| DF | 12 | (Honduras) Iván Guerrero |
| DF | 16 | (Honduras) Johnny Leverón | (yellow card) 24' |
| DF | 23 | (Honduras) Sergio Mendoza |
| MF | 8 | (Honduras) Jorge Claros |
| MF | 20 | (Honduras) Amado Guevara |
| MF | 21 | (Honduras) Odis Borjas |
| MF | 24 | (Honduras) Omar Elvir | (substituted off) 64' |
| MF | 28 | (Honduras) Adán Ramírez | (substituted off) 71' |
| FW | 7 | (Guatemala) Guillermo Ramírez | Yellow card | (substituted off) 90+5' |
| FW | 27 | (Honduras) Jerry Bengtson |
Substitutions:
| FW | 9 | (Colombia) Mauricio Copete | (substituted on) 64' | (yellow card) 90+3' |
| MF | 33 | (Honduras) Esdras Padilla | (substituted on) 71' |
| DF | 4 | (Honduras) Júnior Izaguirre | (substituted on) 90+5' |
Manager:
(Honduras) Ramón Maradiaga

| GK | 1 | (Uruguay) Kerpo de León | (yellow card) 90+1' |
| DF | 2 | (Colombia) Luis Castro |
| DF | 5 | (Honduras) Brayan Beckeles |
| DF | 13 | (Honduras) Rommel Murillo | Yellow card |
| DF | 15 | (Honduras) Porciano Ávila |
| MF | 12 | (Honduras) Arnold Peralta |
| MF | 19 | (Uruguay) Pablo Genovese |
| MF | 30 | (Honduras) Christian Altamirano | (yellow card) 23' | (substituted off) 53' |
| MF | – | (Honduras) Javier Portillo | (yellow card) 9' |
| FW | 10 | (Brazil) Jocimar Nascimento | (substituted off) 77' |
| FW | 28 | (Honduras) Pompilio Cacho | (substituted off) 86' |
Substitutions:
| MF | 17 | (Honduras) Francisco Pavón | (substituted on) 53' |
| MF | 8 | (Honduras) Orlin Peralta | (substituted on) 77' |
| DF | 7 | (Honduras) Milton Ruiz | (substituted on) 86' |
Manager:
(Honduras) Carlos Martínez

- Motagua 3–3 Vida on aggregate score; Motagua advanced on better Regular season performance

==== Final ====
===== Olimpia vs Motagua =====
8 May 2011
16:30 (UTC−06:00)

| Motagua | 2–2 | Olimpia |
|---|---|---|
| Guevara 42'; Bengtson 68' | Report | Caetano 10'; Bruschi 74' |

Estadio Tiburcio Carías Andino
Tegucigalpa
Attendance: 12,462
Referee: Raúl Castro

| Motagua | Olimpia |

| GK | 22 | (Honduras) Donaldo Morales |
| DF | 12 | (Honduras) Iván Guerrero |
| DF | 16 | (Honduras) Johnny Leverón |
| DF | 23 | (Honduras) Sergio Mendoza |
| MF | 8 | (Honduras) Jorge Claros | Yellow card |
| MF | 20 | (Honduras) Amado Guevara | (yellow card) 73' |
| MF | 21 | (Honduras) Odis Borjas |
| MF | 24 | (Honduras) Omar Elvir | (substituted off) 40' |
| MF | 28 | (Honduras) Adán Ramírez |
| FW | 9 | (Colombia) Mauricio Copete | (substituted off) 72' |
| FW | 27 | (Honduras) Jerry Bengtson |
Substitutions:
| FW | 11 | (Honduras) Aly Arriola (substituted on) 40' |
| MF | 19 | (Honduras) Emilson Cruz | (substituted on) 72' |
| – | – |
Manager:
(Honduras) Ramón Maradiaga

| GK | 28 | (Honduras) Donis Escober |
| DF | 4 | (Brazil) Fábio de Souza |
| DF | 5 | (Honduras) Wilfredo Barahona |
| DF | 6 | (Honduras) Juan García |
| DF | 19 | (Honduras) Johnny Calderón | (substituted off) 72' |
| DF | 30 | (Honduras) Johnny Palacios |
| MF | 12 | (Honduras) Miguel Castillo |
| MF | 20 | (Honduras) Walter Hernández |
| MF | 32 | (Honduras) Óscar García | Yellow card |
| FW | 18 | (Brazil) Douglas Caetano | (substituted off) 87' |
| FW | 33 | (Uruguay) Ramiro Bruschi | (substituted off) 80' |
Substitutions:
| MF | 22 | (Honduras) Reynaldo Tilguath | (substituted on) 72' |
| FW | 21 | (Honduras) Roger Rojas | (substituted on) 80' |
| FW | 23 | (Brazil) José Dias | (substituted off) 87' |
Manager:
(Honduras) Juan Espinoza

15 May 2011
17:00 (UTC−06:00)

| Olimpia | 1–3 | Motagua |
|---|---|---|
| de Souza 29' | Report | Bengtson 16' 90+3' (pen.); Guevara 46' |

Estadio Tiburcio Carías Andino
Tegucigalpa
Attendance: 23,326
Referee: Héctor Rodríguez

| Olimpia | Motagua |

| GK | 27 | (Honduras) Noel Valladares |
| DF | 4 | (Brazil) Fábio de Souza | (yellow card) 57' |
| DF | 5 | (Honduras) Wilfredo Barahona | (substituted off) 66' |
| DF | 6 | (Honduras) Juan García | (red card) 90+4' |
| DF | 19 | (Honduras) Johnny Calderón | (yellow card) 57' | (substituted off) 59' |
| DF | 30 | (Honduras) Johnny Palacios | (yellow card) 17' |
| MF | 12 | (Honduras) Miguel Castillo | (substituted off) 72' |
| MF | 20 | (Honduras) Walter Hernández | (yellow card) 90' |
| MF | 32 | (Honduras) Óscar García |
| FW | 18 | (Brazil) Douglas Caetano |
| FW | 33 | (Uruguay) Ramiro Bruschi |
Substitutions:
| MF | 22 | (Honduras) Reynaldo Tilguath | (substituted on) 59' |
| FW | 23 | (Brazil) José Dias | (substituted on) 66' |
| MF | 16 | (Honduras) Alexander López | (substituted on) 72' |
Manager:
(Honduras) Juan Espinoza

| GK | 22 | (Honduras) Donaldo Morales | Yellow card |
| DF | 4 | (Honduras) Júnior Izaguirre |
| DF | 12 | (Honduras) Iván Guerrero |
| DF | 23 | (Honduras) Sergio Mendoza |
| DF | 26 | (Honduras) David Molina | (substituted off) 90+1' |
| MF | 7 | (Guatemala) Guillermo Ramírez | (yellow card) 27' | (substituted off) 69' |
| MF | 8 | (Honduras) Jorge Claros |
| MF | 20 | (Honduras) Amado Guevara |
| MF | 21 | (Honduras) Odis Borjas |
| MF | 28 | (Honduras) Adán Ramírez | (substituted off) 75' |
| FW | 27 | (Honduras) Jerry Bengtson | (yellow card) 57' |
Substitutions:
| FW | 11 | (Honduras) Aly Arriola | (substituted on) 69' |
| MF | 33 | (Honduras) Esdras Padilla | (substituted on) 75' |
| DF | 16 | (Honduras) Johnny Leverón | (substituted on) 90+1' |
Manager:
(Honduras) Ramón Maradiaga

- Motagua won 5–3 on aggregate score.

Liga Nacional
2010–11 Clausura champion

12th title

=== Top goalscorers ===
As of 15 May 2011

- 15 goals:

(Honduras) Jerry Bengtson (Motagua)

- 12 goals:

(Brazil) Ney Costa (Deportes Savio)

- 9 goals:

(Honduras) Elmer Zelaya (Victoria)

- 7 goals:

(Honduras) Rolando López (Deportes Savio)
(Uruguay) Óscar Torlacoff (Hispano)

- 6 goals:

(Uruguay) Julio Rodríguez (Real España)
(Honduras) Eddie Hernández (Platense)

- 5 goals:

(Honduras) Roger Rojas (Olimpia)
(Honduras) Nery Medina (Necaxa)
(Uruguay) Ramiro Bruschi (Olimpia)
(Honduras) Francisco Pavón (Vida)
(Honduras) Rony Flores (Marathón)
(Honduras) Amado Guevara (Motagua)
(Colombia) Charles Córdoba (Necaxa)
(Brazil) Douglas Caetano (Olimpia)

- 4 goals:

(Honduras) Mitchel Rivera (Platense)
(Honduras) Carlos Oliva (Victoria)
(Honduras) Emil Martínez (Marathón)
(Honduras) Pompilio Cacho (Vida)

- 3 goals:

(Belize) Harrison Róches (Necaxa)
(Honduras) Melvin Valladares (Real España)
(Honduras) Alexander Aguilar (Platense)
(Brazil) Jocimar Nascimento (Vida)
(Argentina) José Pacini (Platense)
(Honduras) Samir Arzú (Victoria)
(Honduras) Óscar Durón (Necaxa)
(Argentina) Pablo Genovese (Vida)
(Honduras) Mario Martínez (Real España)
(Honduras) Javier Portillo (Vida)
(Honduras) Saul Martínez (Victoria)
(Guatemala) Guillermo Ramírez (Motagua)

- 2 goals:

(Honduras) Román Castillo (Vida)
(Uruguay) Jorge Ramírez (Real España)
(Honduras) Óscar García (Olimpia)
(Honduras) Rubén Licona (Necaxa)
(Honduras) Juan Cárcamo (Platense)
(Honduras) Orvin Paz (Marathón)
(Honduras) Gerson Rodas (Real España)
(Honduras) Julián Rápalo (Deportes Savio)
(Honduras) Edder Delgado (Real España)
(Honduras) Sergio Mendoza (Motagua)
(Honduras) Fernando Castillo (Marathón)
(Honduras) Adán Ramírez (Motagua)
(Honduras) Carlos Mejía (Marathón)
(Honduras) Reynaldo Tilguath (Olimpia)
(Honduras) Víctor Morales (Hispano)
(Honduras) Milton Ruiz (Vida)
(Honduras) Rommel Murillo (Vida)
(Honduras) Rubén Matamoros (Necaxa)

- 1 goal:

(Honduras) Marvin Sánchez (Necaxa)
(Colombia) Steven Jiménez (Victoria)
(Honduras) Erick Norales (Marathón)
(Honduras) Fredixon Elvir (Olimpia)
(Colombia) Eder Arias (Platense)
(Honduras) Jairo Róchez (Victoria)
(Honduras) Franco Güity (Olimpia)
(Honduras) Henry Martínez (Real España)
(Honduras) Kurt Cárcamo (Marathón)
(Honduras) Víctor Ortiz (Victoria)
(Honduras) Danilo Turcios (Olimpia)
(Honduras) Johnny Leverón (Motagua)
(Honduras) Mario Girón (Motagua)
(Honduras) Juan Mejía (Deportes Savio)
(Honduras) Maynor Martínez (Real España)
(Honduras) Astor Henríquez (Marathón)
(Brazil) Fábio de Souza (Olimpia)
(Brazil) Edilson Pereira (Marathón)
(Honduras) Bani Lozano (Olimpia)
(Honduras) Irbin Guerrero (Deportes Savio)
(Uruguay) Sergio Bica (Real España)
(Honduras) Henry Acosta (Hispano)
(Honduras) José Discua (Hispano)
(Honduras) Jorge Claros (Motagua)
(Honduras) Johnny Calderón (Olimpia)
(Honduras) Víctor Mena (Victoria)
(Honduras) Carlos Sánchez (Marathón)
(Honduras) Milton Palacios (Victoria)
(Honduras) Leonardo Morales (Hispano)
(Uruguay) Claudio Cardozo (Marathón)
(Honduras) Félix Crisanto (Victoria)
(Argentina) Héctor Patiño (Deportes Savio)
(Colombia) Mauricio Copete (Motagua)
(Honduras) Francisco López (Deportes Savio)
(Honduras) Carlos Solórzano (Platense)
(Honduras) Alexander López (Olimpia)
(Argentina) Sergio Diduch (Hispano)
(Honduras) Dany Pineda (Hispano)
(Honduras) Carlos Morán (Motagua)
(Honduras) David Meza (Platense)
(Honduras) Leonardo Isaula (Necaxa)
(Honduras) Luis Santamaría (Marathón)
(Honduras) Pedro Domínguez (Hispano)
(Honduras) Luis Lobo (Real España)
(Honduras) Diego Rodríguez (Real España)
(Honduras) Fabio Ulloa (Necaxa)
(Honduras) Jesús Navas (Necaxa)
(Honduras) Christian Altamirano (Vida)
(Colombia) Luis Castro (Vida)

- 1 own-goal:

(Honduras) Henry Acosta (Hispano)
(Honduras) Carlos Pérez (Necaxa)
(Honduras) Astor Henríquez (Marathón)
(Brazil) Douglas Mattoso (Olimpia)
(Honduras) Mario Padilla (Deportes Savio)
(Honduras) Vicente Solórzano (Deportes Savio)
(Honduras) Jorge Lozano (Vida)

== Aggregate table ==
Relegation was determined by the aggregated table of both Apertura and Clausura tournaments. On 17 April 2011 Hispano F.C. were relegated to the Liga de Ascenso after a 0–0 home draw against C.D. Marathón at Estadio Carlos Miranda. Hispano played 6 season at Liga Nacional since 2005–06.

| Pos | Team | Pld | W | D | L | GF | GA | GD | Pts | Qualification or relegation |
|---|---|---|---|---|---|---|---|---|---|---|
| 1 | Olimpia | 36 | 16 | 13 | 7 | 53 | 30 | +23 | 61 | Qualified to the 2011–12 CONCACAF Champions League Preliminary Round (Note: Olimpia qualified to the 2011–12 CONCACAF Champions League as berth reallocated from Belize.) |
| 2 | Marathón | 36 | 15 | 11 | 10 | 47 | 35 | +12 | 56 | |
| 3 | Real España | 36 | 13 | 15 | 8 | 53 | 47 | +6 | 54 | Qualified to the 2011–12 CONCACAF Champions League Group Stage (Note: Real España and Motagua qualified to the 2011–12 CONCACAF Champions League as Apertura and Clausura champions respectively.) |
| 4 | Motagua | 36 | 13 | 13 | 10 | 46 | 42 | +4 | 52 | Qualified to the 2011–12 CONCACAF Champions League Preliminary Round |
| 5 | Vida | 36 | 14 | 9 | 13 | 49 | 41 | +8 | 51 | |
| 6 | Victoria | 36 | 13 | 7 | 16 | 51 | 59 | −8 | 46 | |
| 7 | Necaxa | 36 | 10 | 13 | 13 | 43 | 43 | 0 | 43 | |
| 8 | Platense | 36 | 12 | 7 | 17 | 41 | 51 | −10 | 43 | |
| 9 | Deportes Savio | 36 | 10 | 11 | 15 | 47 | 66 | −19 | 41 | |
| 10 | Hispano | 36 | 8 | 13 | 15 | 33 | 49 | −16 | 37 | Relegated to the 2011–12 Liga de Ascenso |

Updated to match(es) played on 20 April 2011. Source:
Rules for classification: 1) points; 2) goal difference; 3) number of goals scored.
