= Carlos Palacios =

Carlos Palacios may refer to:

- Carlos Palacios (Chilean footballer) (born 2000)
- Carlos Palacios (Honduran footballer) (born 1982)
- Carlos Palacios (sprinter) (born 1999)
- Carlos Palacios Zapata (1868–1903), Chilean lawyer and politician
