= Luis Lobo (footballer) =

Honduran footballer (born 1987)

Personal information
- Full name: Luis Roberto Lobo Dubón
- Date of birth: 26 December 1987 (age 38)
- Place of birth: La Lima, Honduras
- Height: 1.75 m (5 ft 9 in)
- Positions: Attacking midfielder; centre forward

Team information
- Current team: Parrillas One
- Number: 25

Youth career
- 2007–2008: Real España

Senior career*
Years	Team	Apps	(Gls)
2008–	Real España	58	(17)
2013–	→ Parrillas One (loan)	18	(9)

International career^{‡}
2013–	Honduras	3	(0)
- * Club domestic league appearances and goals as of 20:27, 27 July 2011 (UTC) ‡ National team caps and goals as of 8:54, 19 July 2011 (UTC)

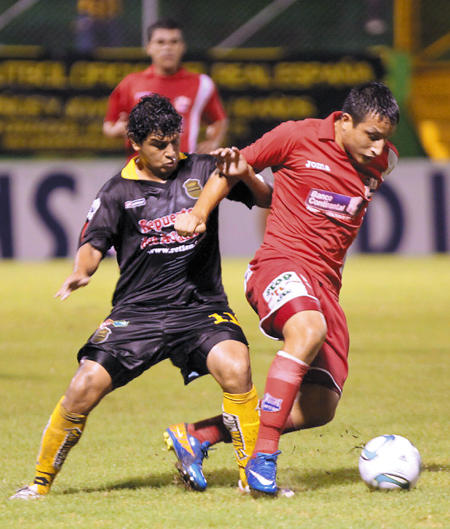
A photo of Luis Roberto lobo Dubon

Luis Roberto Lobo Dubón (born 26 December 1987) is a Honduran footballer who currently as a forward or midfielder for the Liga Nacional de Honduras club Parrillas One.

== Club career ==
Lobo started his career at Real España. He became well-known thanks to his performance with the team on the 2010–11 Apertura, becoming an important player for winning the title.

In 2013, he was transferred to Parrillas One.

== International career ==
Luis Lobo made his senior debut against El Salvador on 18 January 2013.
