= Juan Carlos García (Honduran footballer) =

Honduran footballer (1988-2018)

Personal information
- Full name: Juan Carlos García Barahona
- Date of birth: 8 March 1988
- Place of birth: Tela, Honduras
- Date of death: 8 January 2018 (aged 29)
- Height: 1.75 m (5 ft 9 in)
- Position: Left-back

Youth career
- Marathón

Senior career*
Years	Team	Apps	(Gls)
2007–2010	Marathón	53	(1)
2010–2013	Olimpia	80	(4)
2013–2016	Wigan Athletic	2	(0)
2014–2015	→ Tenerife (loan)	1	(0)
Total		133	(5)

International career
2009–2014	Honduras	39	(1)
- * Club domestic league appearances and goals

Juan Carlos García Barahona (8 March 1988 – 8 January 2018) was a Honduran professional footballer who played as a left-back.

He began his career at Marathón and later went on to Olimpia. He signed for Wigan Athletic in 2013, where he made one appearance in the Football League Cup. He also had a loan spell at Tenerife in which he did not play a match.

A full international from 2009 to 2014. García earned 39 caps for Honduras. He was included in their squads for three CONCACAF Gold Cups and the 2014 FIFA World Cup.

== Club career ==
=== Marathón ===
García came through the youth ranks of and started his senior career with C.D. Marathón.

=== Olimpia ===
On 12 July 2010, it was announced García would move on a free transfer to CD Olimpia.

He made his first appearance for the club in the Liga Nacional de Fútbol de Honduras against Hispano in a 2–0 victory.

García was heavily criticized by the club's followers in the two finals of the Liga Nacional de Fútbol de Honduras in which he played. On 11 December 2010, in the second leg final against Real España in the Apertura, Juan Carlos García was sent off in the 78th minute of the game after head butting Mario Martinez, which led to Real España winning 2–1 in extra time. On 15 May 2010, in the second leg final against CD Olimpia in the Clausura, Amado Guevara had at shot at goal from outside of the area deflected by Juan Carlos García with a header that ended up in his own goal, which meant Motagua won the championship with a 3–1 victory.

=== Wigan Athletic ===
On 26 July 2013, García signed a three-year contract with Wigan Athletic. He made his debut for the club on 24 September, starting in a 5–0 away defeat in a Football League Cup third round match against Manchester City. García made no further appearances that season, his only time named in the matchday squad was as a substitute was for a Championship match on 6 October, a 2–1 home win over Blackburn Rovers.

On 10 August 2014 García moved to Spanish Segunda División side CD Tenerife, on a season-long loan. Two weeks later he was included in a matchday squad for the only time, a 1–0 defeat away to SD Ponferradina on the opening day. He returned to Wigan on 8 January 2015, after making no appearances for the club. He was released by Wigan at the end of the 2015–16 season and subsequently retired.

== International career ==
García made his debut for Honduras in a July 2009 CONCACAF Gold Cup match against Grenada, coming on as a sub for Carlos Palacios. He also represented his country in 4 FIFA World Cup qualification matches and played at the 2011 UNCAF Nations Cup, as well as at the 2009 CONCACAF Gold Cup and 2011 CONCACAF Gold Cups.

On 3 June 2011, García was included by Luis Fernando Suárez in Honduras' 23-man squad for the 2011 CONCACAF Gold Cup due to an injury to defender Emilio Izaguirre.

On 6 February 2013, Garcia scored his lone international goal, a bicycle kick to equalise in a 2–1 home win against the United States during World Cup qualifying. It was the first time in 24 years that the United States had lost their first game of a World Cup qualification campaign. He made one appearance at the 2014 FIFA World Cup in Brazil as Honduras exited in the group stage, replacing Izaguirre at half time in a 2–1 defeat to Ecuador in Curitiba on 21 June.

=== International goals ===
N.	Date	Venue	Opponent	Score	Result	Competition
1	6 February 2013	Estadio Olímpico Metropolitano, San Pedro Sula, Honduras	United States	1–1	2–1	2014 FIFA World Cup qualification

== Illness and death ==
On 16 February 2015, it was announced that García had been diagnosed with leukaemia. He died on 8 January 2018.
