= Juan Manuel Cárcamo =

Honduran footballer (born 1974)

Personal information
- Full name: Juan Manuel Cárcamo Flores
- Date of birth: 22 May 1974 (age 52)
- Place of birth: San Pedro Sula, Honduras
- Height: 1.82 m (6 ft 0 in)
- Position: Forward

Team information
- Current team: Real Sociedad

Senior career*
Years	Team	Apps	(Gls)
1996–2000	Platense	114	(58)
2000–2001	Wüstenrot Salzburg	53	(13)
2002	Bad Bleiberg	10	(3)
2002–2008	Olimpia	196	(31)
2008–2009	Victoria	23	(4)
2010–2011	Platense	35	(7)
2012	Real Sociedad		

International career^{‡}
1999–2004	Honduras	18	(3)
- * Club domestic league appearances and goals as of 2 April 2011 ‡ National team caps and goals as of 2004

Juan Manuel Cárcamo Flores (born 22 May 1974) is a retired Honduran football striker, who last played for Real Sociedad in the Honduran National League.

== Club career ==
He started his career at Platense before joining fellow Hondurans Maynor Suazo and Julio César Suazo at Austrian team Wüstenrot Salzburg. He then moved to Austrian Second Division outfit BSV Bad Bleiberg, where he lined up alongside compatriots Reynaldo Clavasquín and Francisco Pavón.

In April 2011, Platense skipper Cárcamo scored his 100th career goal in the Honduran top tier against Deportes Savio, becoming only the third player to do so after Wilmer Velásquez and Denilson Costa. In November 2011, Platense announced the release of veteran Cárcamo, who scored 63 goals for the club.

In January 2012, El Abuelo (Grandpa) signed for Second Division side Real Sociedad with whom he won promotion to the top level.

Team	Season	Games	Start	Sub	Goal	YC	RC
Club Deportivo Platense	1996–97	16	13	3	11	–	–
Club Deportivo Platense	1997–98 A	20	15	5	11	–	–
Club Deportivo Platense	1997–98 C	19	14	6	8	–	–
Club Deportivo Platense	1998–99	18	14	5	6	–	–
Club Deportivo Platense	1999–2000 A	20	15	5	8	–	–
Club Deportivo Platense	1999–2000 C	21	19	2	14	–	–
Club Deportivo Olimpia	2002–03 A	17	11	6	2	–	–
Club Deportivo Olimpia	2002–03 C	19	14	5	5	–	–
Club Deportivo Olimpia	2003–04 A	19	17	2	3	–	–
Club Deportivo Olimpia	2003–04 A	20	16	4	7	–	–
Club Deportivo Olimpia	2004–05 A	17	11	6	3	–	–
Club Deportivo Olimpia	2004–05 C	18	16	2	4	–	–
Club Deportivo Olimpia	2005–06 A	16	12	4	2	–	–
Club Deportivo Olimpia	2005–06 C	15	10	5	1	–	–
Club Deportivo Olimpia	2006–07 A	15	11	4	1	–	–
Club Deportivo Olimpia	2006–07 C	14	8	6	2	–	–
Club Deportivo Olimpia	2007–08 A	12	6	6	0	–	–
Club Deportivo Olimpia	2007–08 C	14	7	6	1	–	–
Club Deportivo Victoria	2008–09 A	14	14	0	3	1	0
Club Deportivo Victoria	2008–09 C	14	7	7	1	–	–
Club Deportivo Platense	2009–10 C	16	7	9	2	–	–
Club Deportivo Platense	2010–11 A	16	8	8	3	–	–
Club Deportivo Platense	2010–11 C	14	9	5	2	–	–

== International career ==
Cárcamo made his debut for Honduras in a November 1999 friendly match against Guatemala and has earned a total of 18 caps, scoring 3 goals. He has represented his country in 7 FIFA World Cup qualification matches.

His final international was a November 2004 FIFA World Cup qualification against Costa Rica.

=== International goals ===
N.	Date	Venue	Opponent	Score	Result	Competition
1	16 December 1999	Estadio Olímpico Metropolitano, San Pedro Sula, Honduras	Zambia	1–0	7–1	Friendly match
2	8 March 2000	La Casa Blanca, Quito, Ecuador	Ecuador	1–1	3–1	Friendly match
3	8 March 2000	La Casa Blanca, Quito, Ecuador	Ecuador	2–1	3–1	Friendly match
