= Ramon Castillo (footballer) =

Honduran footballer (born 1985)

Ramón Castillo
Personal information
- Full name: Ramón Alberto Castillo Hernández
- Date of birth: June 10, 1985 (age 41)
- Place of birth: San Manuel, Cortés, Honduras
- Height: 1.75 m (5 ft 9 in)
- Position: Striker

Team information
- Current team: CD Marathón

Youth career
- San Manuel Junior

Senior career*
Years	Team	Apps	(Gls)
2006–2008	Olimpia		
2008–2010	Real España		
2011	Atlético Marte		
2011	Platense		
2012	Juventud Retalteca		
2012–2013	Real España		
2013	CD Marathón		
- * Club domestic league appearances and goals

Ramón Alberto Castillo Hernández (born 10 June 1985) is a Honduran footballer, who last played for CD Marathón.

== Club career ==
Castillo played for Olimpia, Real España as well as for Salvadoran outfit Atlético Marte. In July 2011 he joined Platense.

He signed with Guatemalan side Juventud Retalteca in January 2012, but was released in April 2012 since the club could not afford to pay his wages.
