= Arenal, Honduras =

Arenal
- Municipality
- Location in Honduras
- Coordinates: 15°21′N 86°50′W
- Country: Honduras
- Department: Yoro
- Villages: 7

Area
  - Total: 169.3 km^{2} (65.4 sq mi)

Population (2015)
  - Total: 5,971
  - Density: 35.27/km^{2} (91.35/sq mi)
- Time zone: UTC-6 (Central America)

Arenal is a municipality in the Honduran department of Yoro.

== Demographics ==
At the time of the 2013 Honduras census, Arenal municipality had a population of 5,949. Of these, 99.51% were Mestizo, 0.24% Black or Afro-Honduran, 0.22% Indigenous and 0.03% White.
