= Daniel Cigogna =

Argentine footballer (born 1982)

Personal information
- Full name: Daniel José Cigogna Antelo
- Date of birth: October 8, 1982 (age 44)
- Place of birth: Santa Fe, Argentina
- Height: 1.79 m (5 ft 10 in)
- Position: Striker

Team information
- Current team: Sportivo Belgrano

Youth career
- 2001: Quilmes

Senior career*
Years	Team	Apps	(Gls)
2002–2004	Quilmes	28	(5)
2004	Universitario de Deportes	21	(6)
2005	Quilmes	7	(1)
2005	Atlético Rafaela	2	(0)
2006	Unión Central	10	(1)
2006	Los Andes	13	(2)
2007	Estudiantes (BA)	18	(5)
2007–2008	Sarmiento	35	(10)
2008	Talleres (RE)	21	(6)
2009–2010	C.D. Olimpia	16	(6)
2011–	Sportivo Belgrano	23	(12)
- * Club domestic league appearances and goals as of October 20, 2013

Daniel Jose Cigogna (born 8 November 1982) is an Argentine footballer. He plays in Honduras with Olimpia.

Cigogna began his career with local club Quilmes Atlético Club after loan spells with Universitario de Deportes and Atlético Rafaela and a stint in Bolivia with Unión Central he played in the lower divisions of Argentine football with Los Andes, Estudiantes (BA), Sarmiento and Talleres (RE). In 2009, he moved to Honduras and joined CD Olimpia.
