= Douglas Caetano =

Brazilian footballer (born 1981)

Personal information
- Full name: Douglas Caetano Mattoso dos Santos
- Date of birth: 6 January 1981 (age 45)
- Place of birth: Rio de Janeiro, Brazil
- Height: 1.86 m (6 ft 1 in)
- Position: Forward

Team information
- Current team: C.D. Águila

Senior career*
Years	Team	Apps	(Gls)
2002	São José RS		
2002–2003	Wuhan Optics Valley		
2003–2004	Novo Hamburgo		
2004–2006	Atlético Mexiquense		
2006–2007	Rampla Juniors		
2007–2008	Real España		(10)
2008–2009	Tijuana	13	(3)
2009–2011	Real España		(27)
2011–	Olimpia	20	(5)
- * Club domestic league appearances and goals as of 8:53, 15 August 2011 (UTC)

Douglas Caetano Mattoso dos Santos (born 6 January 1981) is a Brazilian footballer who plays as a forward for Águila in Primera División de Fútbol de El Salvador.

== Career ==
=== Real España ===
On 13 October 2007, Caetano made his first goal in the Liga Nacional de Honduras with Real España in a 1–2 defeat against Victoria in the Estadio Francisco Morazán in the 90th minute.

=== Tijuana ===
On 20 July 2008, Caetano made his official debut with Tijuana in the Liga de Ascenso against Académicos de Guadalajara in the Estadio Jalisco, where he scored his first goal in the 69th minute in a 1–1 draw.

=== Return to Real España ===
On 14 January 2009, the 27-year-old forward signed a deal to return to his old club Real España after spending just one season with Tijuana. On 25 February 2009 Caetano scored a goal against Vida in the 25th minute in the Liga Nacional de Honduras.

=== Olimpia ===
On 5 January 2011, Caetano had reached an agreement signing a two-year contract with Olimpia.

On 16 January 2011, Caetano made his debut in the Liga Nacional de Honduras with Olimpia, replacing Anthony Lozano in the 71st minute, in a 1–0 defeat against Hispano in the Estadio Carlos Miranda, Comayagua. On 23 January 2011 he scored his first goal in a league match against Victoria, in a 3–1 victory. On 16 February 2011, he scored his first brace for the club in a 2–1 win over Necaxa.

== Honours ==
=== Clubs ===
Real España

- Liga Nacional: 2009–10 A

=== Individual ===
- Liga Nacional Top Scorer: 1

2007-08 C
