= Bani Lozano =

Honduran international footballer (born 1982)

Personal information
- Full name: Bani Ramón Lozano Núñez
- Date of birth: 15 April 1982 (age 44)
- Place of birth: Arenal, Honduras
- Height: 1.75 m (5 ft 9 in)
- Position: Left back

Team information
- Current team: Platense

Youth career
- Platense

Senior career*
| Years | Team | Apps | (Gls) |
| 2002–2006 | Platense | | |
| 2006 | Nacional | | |
| 2006–2010 | Platense | | (24) |
| 2010–2011 | Olimpia | | (2) |
| 2011–2012 | Marathón | | (1) |
| 2013– | Platense | | |

International career^{‡}
| 2007– | Honduras | 2 | (0) |
- * Club domestic league appearances and goals ‡ National team caps and goals as of 1 February 2013

Bani Ramón Lozano Núñez (born 1 May 1982 in Arenal) is a Honduran international footballer who plays for Platense in the Liga Nacional de Honduras.

His usual position is left back, but he is also capable of operating as a winger.

== Club career ==
Lozano was only 15 when he made his debut for Platense in 2002. Later in the year 2006, he was transferred to Nacional, with which he failed to secure a first-team place.

=== Return to Platense ===
Lozano returned to Platense in January 2007. He scored 24 league goals for Platense during his six seasons with the club.

=== Olimpia ===
On 16 May 2010, Lozano signed a three-year contract with Olimpia. On 8 August, he made his domestic league debut against Hispano with a 2–0 win.

=== Marathón ===
In June 2011 he joined Marathón. Marathón's coach Ramón Maradiaga however deemed him surplus to requirements in summer 2012, forcing Lozano to sit out the 2012 Apertura season without a club.

=== Platense again ===
At the end of 2012 he was presented as a new reinforcement at Platense.

== International career ==
Lozano made his debut for Honduras in an August 2007 friendly match against El Salvador, and won a second cap five years later.
