= Franco Sosa (footballer, born 1983) =

Uruguayan footballer

Personal information
- Full name: Franco Ariel Sosa Portela
- Date of birth: 12 August 1983 (age 43)
- Place of birth: Tacuarembó, Uruguay
- Height: 1.73 m (5 ft 8 in)
- Position: Midfielder

Senior career*
Years	Team	Apps	(Gls)
2003–2006	Tacuarembó	60	(17)
2007–2009	Marathón	44	(14)
2010	Melgar	19	(1)
2011–2012	Xelajú MC		(5)
2012–2013	Cerro Largo	9	(1)
2013	Deportivo La Guaira	7	(0)
2013–2016	Tacuarembó	45	(4)
2017	Deportivo Mictlán	16	(0)
2017–2018	Tacuarembó	26	(0)
- * Club domestic league appearances and goals as of 11:53, 25 September 2020 (UTC)

Franco Ariel Sosa Portela (born on 12 August 1983 in Tacuarembó) is a Uruguayan footballer.
