= Randy Diamond =

Honduran footballer (born 1987)

Personal information
- Full name: Randy Bruwick Diamond Orellana
- Date of birth: 14 January 1987 (age 39)
- Place of birth: Santa Bárbara, Santa Bárbara, Honduras
- Height: 1.74 m (5 ft 8 1/2 in)
- Position: Forward

Senior career*
Years	Team	Apps	(Gls)
2008–2010	Real Juventud		(6)
2010–2011	Marathón		(6)
2011–2012	→ Hangzhou Greentown (loan)	8	(0)
2012–2013	Marathón	33	(0)
2014	Platense	12	(2)
2015	Deportivo Malacateco	15	(3)
2015	Victoria	5	(1)
2016	Juticalpa	9	(1)
2016	Șoimii Pâncota	3	(0)
2017	Naples United FC		
2018	FK Nevėžis		
- * Club domestic league appearances and goals as of 28 October 2016

Randy Diamond is a Honduran footballer who plays as forward.
