= Francisco Pavón (Honduran footballer) =

Honduran footballer (born 1977)

Personal information
- Full name: Francisco Antonio Pavón Rodríguez
- Date of birth: 28 January 1977 (age 49)
- Place of birth: La Ceiba, Honduras
- Height: 1.73 m (5 ft 8 in)
- Position: Midfielder

Senior career*
| Years | Team | Apps | (Gls) |
| 1998–1999 | Victoria | 21 | (8) |
| 1999–2002 | BSV Bad Bleiberg | 88 | (17) |
| 2002–2004 | Motagua | | (7) |
| 2004–2005 | Platense | | |
| 2005–2007 | Vida | | |
| 2007–2008 | Eğirdir Belediye Spor | | |
| 2008–2009 | Xelajú | 31 | (9) |
| 2009–2012 | Vida | 13 | (14) |

International career
| 1999–2003 | Honduras | 17 | (1) |
- * Club domestic league appearances and goals as of 2009

Francisco Antonio Pavón Rodríguez (born 28 January 1977) is a retired Honduran professional football midfielder who most prominently played for local side Vida.

== Club career ==
Pavón started his career at hometown club Victoria and then played alongside compatriots Walter Nahún López, Reynaldo Clavasquín and Juan Manuel Cárcamo for BSV Bad Bleiberg in the Austrian Football First League. He returned to Honduras after three seasons in Austria in 2002 to play for F.C. Motagua, Platense F.C. and C.D.S. Vida.

Pavón joined Xelajú of the Liga Nacional de Guatemala in July 2008, after spending the 2007–08 season with Turkish amateur club Eğirdir Belediye Spor but returned to Vida in 2009.

He retired in summer 2012 but was lured to playing again by Real Sociedad. In February 2013, Vida could lose all points won in the 2013 Clausura for non-payment of Pavón's contract.

== International career ==
Pavón made his debut for Honduras in a November 1999 friendly match against Trinidad & Tobago and has earned a total of 17 caps, scoring 1 goal. He has represented his country in 3 FIFA World Cup qualification matches and played at the 2000 Summer Olympics. He also played at the 2003 UNCAF Nations Cup as well as at the 2000 CONCACAF Gold Cup. Pavón was on the Honduran team at the 1999 Pan American Games and scored the Honduran goal in a 1–3 defeat to Mexico in the final.

His final international was a February 2003 UNCAF Nations Cup match against Paraguay.

== Career statistics ==
=== International goals ===
Scores and results list. Honduras' goal tally first.

| # | Date | Venue | Opponent | Score | Result | Competition |
|---|---|---|---|---|---|---|
| 1. | 3 June 2000 | Estadio Francisco Morazán, San Pedro Sula, Honduras | Haiti | 2–0 | 4–0 | World Cup qualifier |
