= Marcelo Macías =

Uruguayan footballer (born 1975)

Personal information
- Full name: Marcelo Antonio Macías Oliveri
- Date of birth: September 12, 1975 (age 51)
- Place of birth: Montevideo, Uruguay
- Position: Forward

Senior career*
Years	Team	Apps	(Gls)
1999–2001	Danubio		
2002	Racing		
2003	Rentistas		
2004	Uruguay Montevideo		
2005	Universidad		
2006–2013	Real España		
- * Club domestic league appearances and goals

Marcelo Antonio Macías Oliveri (born September 12, 1975 in Montevideo) is an Uruguayan football goalkeeper.

== Club career ==
Macías currently plays for Real España in the Liga Nacional de Fútbol de Honduras. He played backup for Orlin Vallecillo, but became the first choice keeper when Orlin left the club.
