= Ramiro Bruschi =

Uruguayan football forward (born 1981)

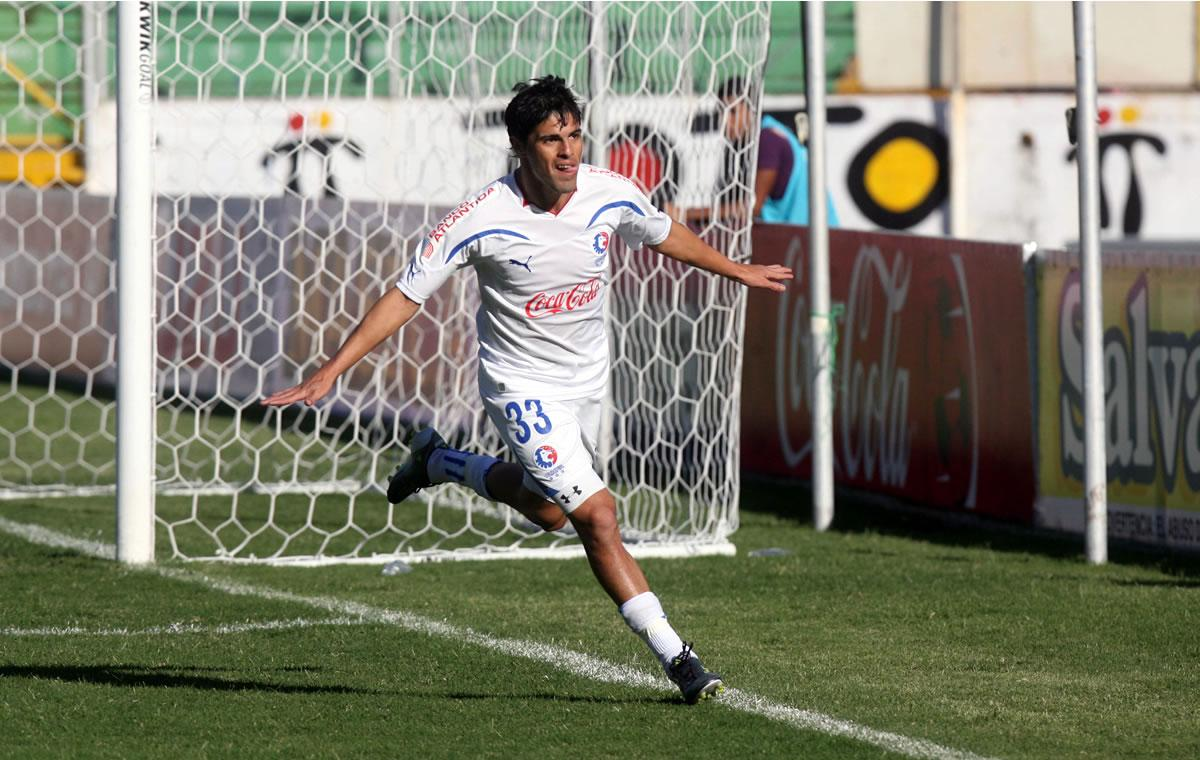

Personal information
- Full name: Ramiro Washington Bruschi Sanguinett
- Date of birth: 5 September 1981 (age 45)
- Place of birth: Tacuarembó, Uruguay
- Height: 1.70 m (5 ft 7 in)
- Position: Forward

Team information
- Current team: Real C.D. España
- Number: 21

Senior career*
Years	Team	Apps	(Gls)
2001–2004	Tacuarembó F.C.		
2004–2005	Paysandú F.C.	15	(6)
2006–2007	Tacuarembó F.C.	28	(8)
2007	Peñarol	20	(1)
2008–2014	C.D. Olimpia	57	(41)
2014–2014	Tacuarembó F.C.		
2015–	Real C.D. España	3	(1)
- * Club domestic league appearances and goals

Ramiro Washington Bruschi (born September, 1981 in Tacuarembó) is a Uruguayan retired football forward who last played for C.D. Olimpia in the Liga Nacional de Honduras.
