= Johnny Calderón =

Honduran footballer (born 1983)

Personal information
- Full name: Johnny Josué Calderón Guity
- Date of birth: July 26, 1983 (age 43)
- Place of birth: La Ceiba, Honduras
- Position: Midfielder

Senior career*
Years	Team	Apps	(Gls)
2005–2008	Vida		
2008–2011	Olimpia		
2011–2012	Real España		

International career^{‡}
2008	Honduras	2	(0)
- * Club domestic league appearances and goals as of April 27, 2008 ‡ National team caps and goals as of May 22, 2008

Johnny Josué Calderón Guity (born 26 July 1983) is a Honduran football player who most recently played for Real España in the Honduran National League.

== Club career ==
He previously played for Vida and Olimpia and joined Real España in summer 2011.

== International career ==
He made his debut for Honduras in a February 2008 friendly match against Paraguay and has earned a total of 2 caps, scoring no goals.
