= Fábio Carioca =

Brazilian footballer (born 1980)

Personal information
- Full name: Fábio de Souza Loureiro
- Date of birth: 10 September 1980 (age 46)
- Place of birth: Rio de Janeiro, Brazil
- Height: 1.83 m (6 ft 0 in)
- Position: Centre back

Senior career*
Years	Team	Apps	(Gls)
2002–2004	Dois Vizinhos		
2004–2005	Cianorte		
2004	→ Londrina (loan)		
2005–2007	Victoria	55	(3)
2008–2017	Olimpia	343	(16)
- * Club domestic league appearances and goals

Fábio de Souza Loureiro or Fábio Carioca (born 10 September 1980) is a former Brazilian footballer, known for his career as a centre back for Liga Nacional de Honduras club Olimpia.

== Club career ==
Fábio made his Campeonato Brasileiro Série B debut on 23 April 2004. He also played the next match against Náutico.

Fábio de Souza left Cianorte for Victoria on 22 August 2005. He then signed for C.D. Olimpia

In 2017, after 12 years playing in Honduras, de Souza retired from professional football.

== Career statistics ==
Club	Season	League		Continental		Total	
Club	Season	Apps	Goals	Apps	Goals	Apps	Goals
Olimpia	2013–14	10	0	2	0	12	0
Total		10	0	2	0	12	0
