= Walter Hernández (footballer) =

Honduran footballer (born 1978)

Personal information
- Full name: Walter Joel Castro Hernández Ordoñez
- Date of birth: December 28, 1978 (age 47)
- Place of birth: Puerto Cortés, Honduras
- Height: 6 ft 0 in (1.83 m)
- Position: Midfielder

Senior career*
Years	Team	Apps	(Gls)
1999–2000	Universidad		
2000–2003	Platense	9	(0)
2002	Puebla	5	(0)
2004–2005	Real España		
2005–2007	Olimpia		
2007	Hispano	15	(2)
2008–2011	Olimpia	75	(8)
2012	Atlético Choloma		
2012	Platense		

International career^{‡}
2002–2004	Honduras	12	(1)
- * Club domestic league appearances and goals as of February 20, 2008 ‡ National team caps and goals as of May 20, 2008

Walter Joel Hernández Ordoñez (born 28 December 1978) is a Honduran football midfielder who currently plays for Platense in the Liga Nacional de Honduras.

== Club career ==
Nicknamed el Zurdo, he started his career at hometown club Platense, before moving abroad to have a short stint in Mexican football with Puebla. He also played for Real España, and Hispano but has played the majority of his career for Olimpia in Tegucigalpa in the Liga Nacional de Honduras.

The left-sided midfielder was released by Olimpia in August 2011 and he joined Atlético Choloma for the 2012 Clausura. He returned to his original team Platense to play in the 2012 Apertura.

== International career ==
Hernández made his debut for Honduras in a November 2002 friendly match against Colombia and has earned a total of 12 caps, scoring 1 goal. He has represented his country at the 2003 CONCACAF Gold Cup.

His final international was a November 2004 FIFA World Cup qualification match against Costa Rica.

=== International goals ===
Scores and results list Honduras' goal tally first.

N.	Date	Venue	Opponent	Score	Result	Competition
1.	27 April 2003	Stade d'Honneur de Dillon, Fort-de-France, Martinique	Martinique	4–2	4–2	2003 CONCACAF Gold Cup qualification
