= Carlos Will Mejía =

Honduran footballer (born 1983)

Personal information
- Full name: Carlos Will Mejía García
- Date of birth: September 29, 1983 (age 43)
- Place of birth: Omoa, Honduras
- Height: 1.82 m (6 ft 0 in)
- Positions: Attacking midfielder; winger

Senior career*
Years	Team	Apps	(Gls)
2004–2008	Platense		
2008–2011	Marathón	98	(20)
2011–2019	Olimpia	204	(27)

International career^{‡}
2007–	Honduras	14	(1)
- * Club domestic league appearances and goals as of 2 June 2019 ‡ National team caps and goals as of 26 February 2013

Carlos Will Mejía García (born September 29, 1983) is a Honduran footballer who most recently played as a midfielder for Olimpia in the Liga Nacional de Honduras.

== Club career ==
Nicknamed Garrincha, Mejía started his professional career at Platense and also played for Marathón, while still on the books of Platense, before joining Olimpia before the 2011 Apertura.

== International career ==
A right winger, Mejía made his debut for Honduras in a February 2007 UNCAF Nations Cup match against Nicaragua in which m he immediately scored a goal, and has, as of January 2013, earned a total of 14 caps, scoring 1 goal. He has represented his country in 3 FIFA World Cup qualification matches and played at the 2007 and 2009 UNCAF Nations Cups as well as at the 2009 CONCACAF Gold Cup.

== International goals ==
Carlos Will Mejia: International goals
No.	Date	Venue	Opponent	Score	Result	Competition
1	15 February 2007	Estadio Cuscatlán, San Salvador, El Salvador	Nicaragua	7 – 1	9–1	UNCAF Nations Cup 2007

== Personal life ==
His mother is a niece of former national team midfielder Prudencio Norales. Mejía is married and has three daughters: Suyapa, Allison and Reina.
