= Carlos Palacios (Honduran footballer) =

Honduran footballer (born 1982)

Personal information
- Full name: Carlos Yovani Palacios Montero
- Date of birth: 30 January 1982 (age 44)
- Place of birth: Balfate, Honduras
- Height: 1.80 m (5 ft 11 in)
- Position: Left back

Team information
- Current team: C.D. Marathón
- Number: 5

Youth career
- Cruz Azul

Senior career*
Years	Team	Apps	(Gls)
2005–2007	Victoria		
2007–2010	Real España	75	(1)
2010–2011	Marathón		
2012	Victoria		
2012–2014	Real Sociedad	53	(0)
2014–2017	C.D. Marathón	84	(2)
2017–2018	Vida	17	(1)
2018–	Motagua New Orleans		

International career
2009	Honduras	8	(0)
- * Club domestic league appearances and goals

Carlos Yovani Palacios Montero (born 30 January 1982) is a Honduran footballer who plays for Motagua New Orleans as a left back.

== Club career ==
Nicknamed Calolo, Palacios started his Liga Nacional career at Victoria and joined Real España in summer 2007. He then moved to Marathón in 2010 but was released in summer 2011.

In summer 2012 he signed for Real Sociedad after another season at Victoria.

== International career ==
Palacios made his debut for Honduras in a June 2009 friendly match against Panama and has earned a total of 6 caps, scoring no goals. He has represented his country at the 2009 CONCACAF Gold Cup.

His final international was a July 2009 CONCACAF Gold Cup match against the USA.

== Personal life ==
Palacios is a cousin of the three Palacios brothers: Jerry, Johnny and Wilson Palacios.
