= 2017 Honduran Cup =

President's Cup

Tournament details
- Country: Honduras
- Dates: 21 January – 13 May 2017
- Teams: 64

Final positions
- Champions: Marathón
- Runner-up: Gimnástico

Tournament statistics
- Matches played: 65
- Goals scored: 205 (3.15 per match)
- All statistics correct as of 13 May 2017.

The 2017 Honduran Cup was the 12th edition of the Honduran Cup and the third as Copa Presidente. The cup is a creation of the Honduran government funded by money allocated to national security fund. Its purpose is to support the growth of sport to detract the youth from vices and to promote national tourism for rural towns.

The cup was contested by 64 teams from the top 3 divisions of the country. There were a total of 10 teams from Liga Nacional (1st division), 27 from Liga de Ascenso (2nd division) and 27 from Liga Mayor (3rd division). Unlike the previous tournament which covered two calendar years, this edition was played in 2017 only.

Juticalpa were the defending champions, but they were eliminated in the round of 16 by Deportes Savio.

The final was held at Estadio Juan Ramón Brevé Vargas in Juticalpa, Olancho. C.D. Marathón as winners, qualified to the 2017 Honduran Supercup.

== Schedule and format ==
The first round started on 21 January. Unlike the previous editions, no third place match was played and the quarterfinals were single matches instead of two-legged ties.

Round	Date		Fixtures	Clubs
Round	First leg	Second leg	Fixtures	Clubs
Round of 64	21–22 January		32	64 → 32
Round of 32	22 February, 7 March		16	32 → 16
Round of 16	22 March		8	16 → 8
Quarterfinals	26, 29 March		8	8 → 4
Semifinals	5 April	19 April	4	4 → 2
Final	13 May		1	2 → 1

== Round of 64 ==
21 January 2017 Round of 64	Atlético Joconeño	2–4	Real Sociedad	Jocón, Yoro
14:00 CST				Stadium: Estadio Adrián Zepeda

21 January 2017 Round of 64	Pinares	1–2	Deportes Savio	Ocotepeque, Ocotepeque
15:00 CST				Stadium: Estadio J.F. Kennedy

21 January 2017 Round of 64	Atlético Municipal	0–5	Honduras Progreso	Tocoa, Colón
15:00 CST				Stadium: Estadio Francisco Martínez Durón

21 January 2017 Round of 64	Atlético Brisas	0–1	Olancho	Taulabé, Comayagua
15:00 CST				Stadium: Estadio Municipal

21 January 2017 Round of 64	CET	1–1 (5–4 p)	Valle	Choluteca, Choluteca
15:00 CST				Stadium: Estadio Fausto Flores Lagos

21 January 2017 Round of 64	La Virtud	3–6	Real España	Gracias, Lempira
15:00 CST				Stadium: Estadio Marco Hernández

21 January 2017 Round of 64	Cerro Porteño	0–8	Marathón	Tela, Atlántida
15:00 CST				Stadium: Estadio León Gómez

21 January 2017 Round of 64	Gremio	1–1 (5–3 p)	Motagua	Goascorán, Valle
16:00 CST				Stadium: Estadio Tommy Zambrano; Referee: Melvin Matamoros

21 January 2017 Round of 64	San Juan	0–2	Platense	Quimistán, Santa Bárbara
16:00 CST				Stadium: Estadio Domingo Ortega

21 January 2017 Round of 64	Infop RNP	8–0	Atlético Esperanzano	Tegucigalpa, Francisco Morazán
18:00 CST				Stadium: Estadio Birichiche

21 January 2017 Round of 64	Discua Nicolás	1–5	Parrillas One	El Progreso, Yoro
19:00 CST				Stadium: Estadio Humberto Micheletti

21 January 2017 Round of 64	CARDVA	0–0 (4–3 p)	Tela	Olanchito, Yoro
19:00 CST				Stadium: Estadio Municipal Olímpico

22 January 2017 Round of 64	Vida Insular	1–3	Arsenal	Roatán, Bay Islands
12:00 CST				Stadium: Estadio Julio Galindo

22 January 2017 Round of 64	Brisas	0–0 (2–4 p)	Estrella Roja	Patuca, Olancho
12:00 CST				Stadium: Estadio Wilson Mejía

22 January 2017 Round of 64	Galácticos	1–1 (5–4 p)	Victoria	Puerto Lempira, Gracias a Dios
12:30 CST				Stadium: Estadio Manuel Brown

22 January 2017 Round of 64	Alianza San José	1–1 (2–4 p)	Gimnástico	Marcala, La Paz
13:00 CST				Stadium: Estadio Regional

22 January 2017 Round of 64	San Rafael	0–5	Olimpia	San Ignacio, Francisco Morazán
13:00 CST				Stadium: Estadio Maturave

22 January 2017 Round of 64	Juventud Otoreña	1–2	Valencia	Jesús de Otoro, Intibucá
14:00 CST				Stadium: Estadio Manuel Castillo Girón

22 January 2017 Round of 64	Juventud Católica	1–9	Juticalpa	Danlí, El Paraíso
14:00 CST				Stadium: Estadio Marcelo Tinoco

22 January 2017 Round of 64	Atlético Florida	0–4	Villanueva	La Entrada, Copán
14:00 CST				Stadium: Estadio Municipal

22 January 2017 Round of 64	Piratas	3–3 (4–5 p)	Comayagua	Nacaome, Valle
14:00 CST				Stadium: Estadio José Nazar

22 January 2017 Round of 64	Jaguares	1–1 (5–6 p)	Real Juventud	Copán Ruinas, Copán
14:00 CST				Stadium: Estadio Copán Gale

22 January 2017 Round of 64	Sampdoria	1–2	Social Sol	Sonaguera, Colón
14:00 CST				Stadium: Estadio Juan de Dios

22 January 2017 Round of 64	Sula	1–1 (4–5 p)	Atlético Choloma	La Lima, Cortés
14:00 CST				Stadium: Estadio Milton Flores

22 January 2017 Round of 64	Juventus	0–0 (5–4 p)	UPNFM	Choluteca, Choluteca
14:00 CST				Stadium: Estadio Fausto Flores Lagos

22 January 2017 Round of 64	Atlético Boca Júnior	4–1	Trujillo	Tocoa, Colón
14:00 CST				Stadium: Estadio Francisco Martínez Durón

22 January 2017 Round of 64	Yoro	0–1	Brasilia	Yoro, Yoro
14:00 CST				Stadium: Estadio Olímpico Yoreño

22 January 2017 Round of 64	Congolón	1–1 (3–5 p)	Lepaera	Ocotepeque, Ocotepeque
15:00 CST				Stadium: Estadio J.F. Kennedy

22 January 2017 Round of 64	Real Juventud	1–4	Atlético Independiente	Taulabé, Comayagua
15:00 CST				Stadium: Estadio Municipal

22 January 2017 Round of 64	Dortmund	2–2 (3–5 p)	Vida	Roatán, Bay Islands
15:00 CST				Stadium: Estadio Julio Galindo

22 January 2017 Round of 64	Atlético Municipal	5–0	Olimpia Occidental	Santa Cruz de Yojoa, Cortés
15:00 CST				Stadium: Estadio Alex Pineda Chacón

22 January 2017 Round of 64	Atlético Valle	0–3	Atlético Limeño	Macuelizo, Santa Bárbara
16:00 CST				Stadium: Estadio Municipal

== Round of 32 ==
22 February 2017 Round of 32	CET	1–1 (6–7 p)	Gimnástico	Choluteca, Choluteca
13:00 CST				Stadium: Estadio Fausto Flores Lagos

22 February 2017 Round of 32	Juventus	1–5	Olimpia	Choluteca, Choluteca
15:00 CST				Stadium: Estadio Fausto Flores Lagos

22 February 2017 Round of 32	Estrella Roja	2–0	Valencia	Danlí, El Paraíso
15:00 CST				Stadium: Estadio Marcelo Tinoco

22 February 2017 Round of 32	Atlético Boca Júnior	3–1	Arsenal	Tocoa, Colón
15:00 CST				Stadium: Estadio Francisco Martínez Durón

22 February 2017 Round of 32	Atlético Limeño	0–0 (4–3 p)	Atlético Choloma	La Lima, Cortés
15:00 CST				Stadium: Estadio Milton Flores

22 February 2017 Round of 32	Atlético Municipal	2–2 (5–3 p)	Real España	Santa Cruz de Yojoa, Cortés
15:30 CST				Stadium: Estadio Alex Pineda Chacón

22 February 2017 Round of 32	Gremio	1–2	Juticalpa	Goascorán, Valle
16:00 CST				Stadium: Estadio Tommy Zambrano

22 February 2017 Round of 32	Infop RNP	2–0	Comayagua	Tegucigalpa, Francisco Morazán
17:00 CST				Stadium: Estadio Birichiche

22 February 2017 Round of 32	Parrillas One	4–3	Real Juventud	San Pedro Sula, Cortés
17:00 CST				Stadium: Estadio Francisco Morazán

22 February 2017 Round of 32	Deportes Savio	1–1 (4–3 p)	Honduras Progreso	Santa Rosa de Copán, Copán
18:30 CST				Stadium: Estadio Sergio Antonio Reyes

22 February 2017 Round of 32	Atlético Independiente	1–1 (2–4 p)	Olancho	Siguatepeque, Comayagua
19:00 CST				Stadium: Estadio Roberto Martínez Ávila

22 February 2017 Round of 32	Brasilia	1–1 (4–5 p)	Social Sol	Río Lindo, Cortés
19:00 CST				Stadium: Estadio Filiberto Fernández

22 February 2017 Round of 32	CARDVA	0–4	Real Sociedad	Olanchito, Yoro
19:00 CST				Stadium: Estadio Municipal Olímpico

22 February 2017 Round of 32	Lepaera	1–1 (2–4 p)	Marathón	Lepaera, Lempira
19:00 CST				Stadium: Estadio Juan Orlando Hernández

22 February 2017 Round of 32	Villanueva	1–1 (6–5 p)	Platense	Villanueva, Cortés
19:00 CST				Stadium: Estadio José Adrián Cruz

7 March 2017 Round of 32	Galácticos	0–0 (1–3 p)	Vida	Puerto Lempira, Gracias a Dios
12:00 CST				Stadium: Estadio Manuel Brown

== Round of 16 ==
All round of 16 matches were originally scheduled for 15 March 2017, but were rescheduled to 22 March due to a lack of funding.

22 March 2017 Round of 16	Estrella Roja	1–1 (3–2 p)	Atlético Limeño	Danlí, El Paraíso
15:00 CST				Stadium: Estadio Marcelo Tinoco

22 March 2017 Round of 16	Atlético Boca Júnior	2–2 (5–4 p)	Real Sociedad	Tocoa, Colón
15:00 CST				Stadium: Estadio Francisco Martínez Durón

22 March 2017 Round of 16	Atlético Municipal	2–2 (3–5 p)	Olimpia	Santa Cruz de Yojoa, Cortés
15:30 CST				Stadium: Estadio Alex Pineda Chacón

22 March 2017 Round of 16	Marathón	2–0	Social Sol	San Pedro Sula, Cortés
15:30 CST				Stadium: Estadio Yankel Rosenthal

22 March 2017 Round of 16	Gimnástico	2–1	Villanueva	Tegucigalpa, Francisco Morazán
19:00 CST

22 March 2017 Round of 16	Olancho	1–1 (7–8 p)	Vida	Juticalpa, Olancho
19:00 CST				Stadium: Estadio Juan Ramón Brevé Vargas

22 March 2017 Round of 16	Deportes Savio	2–0	Juticalpa	Santa Rosa de Copán, Copán
19:00 CST				Stadium: Estadio Sergio Antonio Reyes

22 March 2017 Round of 16	Infop RNP	1–1 (0–3 p)	Parrillas One	Tegucigalpa, Francisco Morazán
20:00 CST

== Quarterfinals ==
Unlike previous editions of this tournament, the quarter-finals consisted of single matches instead of two-legged ties.

26 March 2017 Quarterfinals	Deportes Savio	0–0 (3–5 p)	Marathón	Santa Rosa de Copán, Copán
16:00 CST				Stadium: Estadio Sergio Antonio Reyes

26 March 2017 Quarterfinals	Gimnástico	3–1	Vida	Tegucigalpa, Francisco Morazán
16:30 CST

29 March 2017 Quarterfinals	Atlético Boca Júnior	0–2	Parrillas One	Tocoa, Colón
15:00 CST				Stadium: Estadio Francisco Martínez Durón

29 March 2017 Quarterfinals	Estrella Roja	1–1 (4–3 p)	Olimpia	Danlí, El Paraíso
15:00 CST				Stadium: Estadio Marcelo Tinoco

== Semifinals ==
=== First legs ===
5 April 2017 Semifinals	Marathón	2–0	Estrella Roja	San Pedro Sula, Cortés
15:00 CST	Berríos 41'; Suazo 57'			Stadium: Estadio Yankel Rosenthal

5 April 2017 Semifinals	Parrillas One	0–0	Gimnástico	San Pedro Sula, Cortés
15:00 CST				Stadium: Estadio Olímpico Metropolitano

=== Second legs ===
19 April 2017 Semifinals	Estrella Roja	1–2 (1–4 agg.)	Marathón	Danlí, El Paraíso
15:00 CST				Stadium: Estadio Marcelo Tinoco

19 April 2017 Semifinals	Gimnástico	3–1 (3–1 agg.)	Parrillas One	Tegucigalpa, Francisco Morazán
19:00 CST				Stadium: Estadio Francisco Morazán

== Final ==
13 May 2017 Final	Marathón	3–0	Gimnástico	Juticalpa, Olancho
15:00 CST	Rodríguez 17'; Arboleda 21' 27' Starting XI (GK) Torres – 25; Córdova – 3 Norales – 5 Suazo – 6 Rodríguez – 7 Martínez – 8 López – 12; Espinoza – 15; Banegas – 16; Fuentes – 17; Arboleda – 27; Substitutes; Coach; Keosseián (URU)		Starting XI; Sánchez (GK); Ferrufino; Pineda; Móncada; Acosta; López; Varela; Espinal; Lozano; Alvarado; Canales; Substitutes; Coach (HON) Lozano	Stadium: Estadio Juan Ramón Brevé Vargas; Referee: Jonfy Vallecillo
