= 2012–13 Honduran Liga Nacional de Ascenso =

Liga Nacional de Ascenso
- Season: 2012–13
- Champions: Apertura: Juticalpa; Clausura: Parrillas One
- Promoted: Parrillas One
- Relegated: North: Sonaguera; South: Municipal Paceño
- All statistics correct as of 11 November 2012.

The 2012–13 Liga Nacional de Ascenso de Honduras season was the 34th edition of the Liga Nacional de Ascenso de Honduras, the second division of football in Honduras. For this season, promotion was changed from a two-legged home-and-away match to a one-legged match in a neutral ground. Parrillas One was the promoted team to the 2013–14 Honduran Liga Nacional after defeating Juticalpa F.C. in penalties in Estadio Carlos Miranda in Comayagua.

== 2012–13 teams ==
=== Teams from Zona Norte y Atlántica ===
- Arsenal (Roatan)
- Social Sol (Olanchito)
- Sonaguera FC (Sonaguera)
- Trujillo FC (Trujillo)
- Unión Sabá (Sabá)
- Yoro FC (Yoro)

=== Teams from Zona Norte y Occidente ===
- Atlético Municipal (San Francisco de Yojoa)
- Real Juventud (Santa Bárbara)
- CD Honduras (El Progreso)
- Olimpia Occidental (La Entrada)
- Parrillas One (Tela)
- Sula (La Lima)
- Villanueva FC (Villanueva)

=== Teams from Zona Central ===
- Atlético Esperanzano (La Esperanza)
- Atlético Independiente (Siguatepeque)
- Comayagua FC (Comayagua)
- Marcala FC (Marcala)
- Municipal Paceño (La Paz)
- Nuevo San Isidro (Choluteca)
- UPN (Tegucigalpa)

=== Teams from Zona Centro-Sur y Oriente ===
- Alianza de Becerra (San Francisco de Becerra)
- Atlético Olanchano (Catacamas)
- Juticalpa F.C. (Juticalpa)
- San Lorenzo (San Lorenzo)
- Olimpia B (Teupasenti)
- Valencia (Tegucigalpa)

== Apertura ==
=== Quarterfinals ===
9 November 2012 1st leg	UPNFM	3–3	Atlético Municipal	Tegucigalpa, Francisco Morazán
14:00 (UTC−06:00)

10 November 2012 1st leg	Pumas	1–2	Yoro	Tegucigalpa, Francisco Morazán
18:00 (UTC−06:00)

10 November 2012 1st leg	Honduras Progreso	2–1	Comayagua	El Progreso, Yoro
19:00 (UTC−06:00)

11 November 2012 1st leg	Unión Sabá	3–1	Juticalpa	Sabá, Colón
15:00 (UTC−06:00)

16 November 2012 2nd leg	Yoro	2–0	Pumas	Yoro, Yoro
(UTC−06:00)				Stadium: Estadio Olímpico Yoreño
Note: Yoro won 4–1 on aggregate score

16 November 2012 2nd leg	Atlético Municipal	5–1	UPNFM	Santa Cruz de Yojoa, Cortés
(UTC−06:00)				Stadium: Estadio Alex Pineda Chacón
Note: Atlético Municipal won 8–4 on aggregate score

16 November 2012 2nd leg	Juticalpa	3–0	Unión Sabá	Juticalpa, Olancho
(UTC−06:00)
Note: Juticalpa won 4–3 on aggregate score

16 November 2012 2nd leg	Comayagua	1–1	Honduras Progreso	Comayagua, Comayagua
(UTC−06:00)
Note: Honduras Progreso won 3–2 on aggregate score

=== Semifinals ===
23 November 2012 1st leg	Honduras	1–1	Atlético Municipal	El Progreso, Yoro
17:00 (UTC−06:00)	2–0	Report		Stadium: Estadio Humberto Micheletti

24 November 2012 1st leg	Yoro	1–1	Juticalpa	Yoro, Yoro
14:00 (UTC−06:00)				Stadium: Estadio Olímpico Yoreño

December 2012 2nd leg	Atlético Municipal	3–1	Honduras	San Francisco de Yojoa, Cortés
(UTC−06:00)				Stadium: Estadio Alex Pineda Chacón
Note: Atlético Municipal won on aggregate score

2 December 2012 2nd leg	Juticalpa	2–1	Yoro	Juticalpa, Olancho
(UTC−06:00)	Ariel Alvarado 14'; Rudy Williams	Report	Edwin León 19'	Stadium: Estadio Celio Guifarro; Referee: Ricardo Zelaya
Note: Juticalpa won on aggregate score

=== Final ===
2012 1st leg	Atlético Municipal	2–3	Juticalpa	Santa Cruz de Yojoa, Cortés
(UTC−06:00)			Jorge Núñez	Stadium: Estadio Alex Pineda Chacón

December 2012 2nd leg	Juticalpa	4–1	Atlético Municipal	Juticalpa, Olancho
(UTC−06:00)	Jose Ocampo 53'; Ariel Alvarado 58'; Jorge Núñez 70'; Carlos Lanza 80'	Report	2'	Stadium: Estadio Celio Guifarro
Note: Juticalpa won 7–3 on aggregate score

- Juticalpa won 7–3 on aggregate score.

Liga de Ascenso
2012–13 Apertura champion

1st title

== Clausura ==
=== Quarterfinals ===
27 April 2013 1st leg	Arsenal	2–1	UPNFM	Roatán, Islas de la Bahia
(UTC−06:00)		Report

April 2013 1st leg	Comayagua FC	2–1	Parrillas One	Comayagua, Comayagua
(UTC−06:00)		Report		Stadium: Estadio Carlos Miranda

April 2013 1st leg	Honduras	1–0	Juticalpa	El Progreso, Yoro
(UTC−06:00)		Report		Stadium: Estadio Humberto Micheletti

April 2013 1st leg	San Lorenzo	v	Yoro	Yoro, Yoro
(UTC−06:00)				Stadium: Estadio Ángel Augusto Martínez

4 May 2013 2nd leg	UPNFM	5–0	Arsenal	Tegucigalpa, Francisco Morazán
(UTC−06:00)	Wilson Sorto; Luis Valerio	Report
Note: Jaguares de UPN won 6–2 on aggregate score

May 2013 2nd leg	Parrillas One	5–0	Comayagua FC	Tela, Atlántida
(UTC−06:00)	Gustavo Cálix; Horacio Parham; Johnny Gómez	Report		Stadium: Estadio Alfredo León Gómez
Note: Parrillas One won 6–1 on aggregate score

May 2013 2nd leg	Juticalpa	4–0	Honduras	Juticalpa, Olancho
(UTC−06:00)	Jorge Núñez; Jose Ocampo; Bryan Figueroa; Ovidio Lanza	Report
Note: Juticalpa won 4–1 on aggregate score

May 2013 2nd leg	Yoro	2–1	San Lorenzo	Yoro, Yoro
(UTC−06:00)	César Zelaya; Marlon Mencías	Report
Note: Yoro won on aggregate score

=== Semifinals ===
10 May 2013 1st leg	UPNFM	4–1	Parrillas One	Tegucigalpa, Francisco Morazán
14:00 (UTC−06:00)	Júnior Turcios; Wilson Sorto	Report	Horacio Parham

12 May 2013 1st leg	Yoro	1–1	Juticalpa	Yoro, Yoro
15:00 (UTC−06:00)	Marlon Mancilla 64'	Report	Jose Medina 15'

17 May 2013 2nd leg	Parrillas One	6–0	UPNFM	Tela, Atlántida
(UTC−06:00)		Report		Stadium: Estadio Alfredo León Gómez
Note: Parrillas One won 7–4 on aggregate score

19 May 2013 2nd leg	Juticalpa	2–4 (a.e.t.)	Yoro	Juticalpa, Olancho
13:00 (UTC−06:00)	Blas Hernández 24'; Bryan Ramírez 80'	Report	Lagos 4'; 46'; Edwin León; Kevin Fernández	Attendance: 1,506
Note: Match abandoned by Yoro at the 80th minute due to safety concerns. Final minutes played on May 30. Yoro won 5–3 on aggregate.

=== Finals ===
5 June 2013 1st leg	Yoro	0–0	Parrillas One	Yoro, Yoro
15:00 (UTC−06:00)		Report		Stadium: Estadio Olimpico Yoreño

9 June 2013 2nd leg	Parrillas One	1–0	Yoro	Tela, Atlántida
(UTC−06:00)	Barrios 15'	Report		Stadium: Estadio Alfredo León Gómez

- Parrillas One won 1–0 on aggregate score.

Liga de Ascenso
2012–13 Clausura champion

3rd title

== Promotion Final ==
16 June 2013 Final leg	Parrillas One	1–1 (5–4 p)	Juticalpa	Comayagua, Comayagua
14:00 (UTC−06:00)	Parham 27'	Report	Ariel Alvarado 78'	Stadium: Estadio Carlos Miranda; Referee: Melvin Matamoros
	Penalties
	Solórzano (penalty missed); Zamora (penalty scored); Flores (penalty scored); Leiva (penalty scored); García (penalty scored)		(penalty scored) Mejía; (penalty scored) Alvarado; (penalty missed) Medina; (penalty scored) Ocampo; (penalty scored) Lanza

Parrillas One	Juticalpa

GK	-	(Honduras) Rony García
DF	-	(Honduras) Allan Rivas
DF	-	(Honduras) Gustavo Jiménez
DF	-	(Honduras) Julio Barrios
DF	-	(Honduras) Luis Cálix
MF	-	(Honduras) Juan Romero	(substituted off) 80'
MF	-	(Honduras) Arnold Solorzano
MF	-	(Honduras) José Leiva
MF	-	(Honduras) Roger Hernández	(substituted off) 65'
FW	-	(Honduras) Horacio Parham	(substituted off) 54'
FW	-	(Honduras) Héctor Flores
Substitutions:
–	-	(Honduras) Wilson Rivera	(substituted on) 54'
–	-	(Honduras) Edwin Sierra	(substituted on) 65'
–	-	(Honduras) José Armando Cruz	(red card) 81'	(substituted on) 80'
Manager:
(Honduras) Luis Enrique Cálix

GK	-	(Honduras) Luis Sosa
DF	-'	(Honduras) Wilson Romero
DF	-	(Honduras) Carlos Amador
DF	-	(Honduras) José Medina
DF	-	(Honduras) Oscar Andrés Morales
DF	-	(Honduras) Juan Ocampo
MF	-	(Honduras) José Hernández
MF	-	(Honduras) Marco Mejía
MF	-	(Honduras) Jeffrey Brooks	(substituted off) 65'
FW	-	(Brazil) Ney Costa	(substituted off) 54'
FW	-	(Honduras) Ovidio Lanza
Substitutions:
–	-	(Honduras) Jorge Núñez	(substituted on) 54'
–	-	(Honduras) Ariel Alvarado	(substituted on) 65'
–	-	(Honduras) Herrera	Substituted on
Manager:
(Honduras) Roger Espinoza

Promotion winner

== Relegation ==
=== Zona Norte ===
2013 1st leg	Sonaguera	2–0	Olimpia Occidental	Sonaguera, Colón
(UTC−06:00)		Report

2013 2nd leg	Olimpia Occidental	4–1	Sonaguera	La Entrada, Copán
(UTC−06:00)		Report
Note: Olimpia Occidental won 4–3 on aggregate scored, securing league permanence.

- Sonaguera FC relegated.

=== Zona Centro-Sur ===
2013 1st leg	Valencia	2–0	Municipal Paceño	Tegucigalpa, Francisco Morazán
(UTC−06:00)		Report		Stadium: Estadio El Birichiche

2013 2nd leg	Municipal Paceño	3–5	Valencia	La Paz, La Paz
(UTC−06:00)		Report		Stadium: Estadio Roberto Suazo Córdoba
Note: Valencia won 7–3 on aggregate scored, securing league permanence.

- Municipal Paceño relegated.
