= 2013–14 Honduran Liga Nacional de Ascenso =

Liga Nacional de Ascenso
- Season: 2013–14
- Champions: Apertura: Honduras Progreso; Clausura: Honduras Progreso
- Promoted: Honduras Progreso
- Biggest home win: Atlético Choloma 8–1 Graciano
- Highest scoring: Atlético Choloma 8–1 Graciano
- All statistics correct as of June 2014.

The 2013–14 Liga Nacional de Ascenso de Honduras season was the 35th edition of the Honduran Liga Nacional de Ascenso, the second division of football in Honduras. Since last season, promotion was changed from a two-legged home-and-away match to a one-legged match in a neutral ground. The tournament began on 11 August 2013.

== 2013–14 teams ==
=== Teams from Zona Norte y Atlántica ===
- Arsenal (Roatan)
- CD Honduras (El Progreso)
- Social Sol (Olanchito)
- Sula (La Lima)
- Trujillo FC (Trujillo)
- Unión Sabá (Sabá)
- Yoro FC (Yoro)

=== Teams from Zona Norte y Occidente ===
- Atletico Choloma (Choloma)
- Atletico Limeño (La Lima)
- Atlético Nacional (Villanueva)
- Atlético Municipal (San Francisco de Yojoa)
- Graciano San Francisco (Gracias)
- Lepaera San Isidro (Lepaera)
- Olimpia Occidental (La Entrada)
- Real Juventud (Santa Bárbara)
- Villanueva FC (Villanueva)

=== Teams from Zona Central ===
- Atlético Esperanzano (La Esperanza)
- Atlético Independiente (Siguatepeque)
- Cobán Athletic (Jesús de Otoro)
- Comayagua FC (Comayagua)
- Marcala FC (Marcala)
- UPN (Tegucigalpa)

=== Teams from Zona Centro-Sur y Oriente ===
- Alianza de Becerra (San Francisco de Becerra)
- Atlético Olanchano (Catacamas)
- Juticalpa F.C. (Juticalpa)
- Leon Libertador (Choluteca)
- Valencia (Tegucigalpa)
- Valle FC (Nacaome)

== Apertura ==
=== Regular season ===
==== Results ====
Home \ Away	ARS	HON	SOL	SUL	TRU	SAB	YOR
Arsenal		2–1			1–0	3–0	1–1
Honduras	4–2		2–0				2–1
Social Sol	3–1			5–0		2–4	1–2
Sula	5–1	1–2	1–1				1–0
Trujillo	1–1	1–1	1–1	3–3		1–0	
Unión Sabá		0–2		2–0	2–0		1–4
Yoro				3–2	1–1	1–0	

Source: Jamolandia
Legend: Blue = home team win; Yellow = draw; Red = away team win.

Home \ Away	ACH	ALM	MUN	NAC	GRA	OOC	RJU	VIL
Atlético Choloma				4–1	8–1			
Atlético Limeño							3–0	
Atlético Municipal	1–1	1–1			6–0			
Atlético Nacional								
Graciano San Francisco								3–1
Olimpia Occidental								
Real Juventud						0–1		
Villanueva					4–0	0–1		

Legend: Blue = home team win; Yellow = draw; Red = away team win.
