= 2011–12 Honduran Liga Nacional de Ascenso =

Liga Nacional de Ascenso
- Season: 2011–12
- Champions: Apertura: Real Sociedad; Clausura: Parrillas One
- Promoted: Real Sociedad
- All statistics correct as of 11 December 2011.

The 2011–12 Liga Nacional de Ascenso de Honduras season will be the 33rd season of the Liga Nacional de Ascenso de Honduras, the second division of football in Honduras. It will be contested by 28 teams divided into two zones with two divisions each.

The season is split into two separate tournaments, the Apertura and the Clausura. At the end, the winners of both competitions will face off against each other in order to determine the team which will earn promotion to the First division for the 2012–13 season.

== 2011–12 teams ==
Central-South-East zone
Group A	Group B
Atlético Esperanzano	Atlético Olanchano
Atlético Independiente	Nuevo San Isidro
Municipal Paceño	Olimpia Reservas
Marcala	Atlético Pinares
UPNFM	Valencia
Hispano	Juticalpa
North-West zone
Group A	Group B
Arsenal	Olimpia Occidental
Social Sol	Parrillas One
Yoro	Atlético Junior
Unión Ájax	Villanueva
Sonaguera	Atlético Municipal
Real Sociedad	Real Juventud

== Apertura ==
The Apertura tournament started on 12 August 2011.

=== Regular season ===
==== Results ====
North: Group A
Home \ Away	ARS	RSO	SOL	SON	TRU	SAB	YOR
Arsenal		0–3			2–0		1–0
Real Sociedad			2–1	4–0	2–1		
Social Sol	2–1	1–2		1–1	2–1	2–5	1–1
Sonaguera					0–0		0–2
Trujillo						2–3	
Unión Sabá	2–1						
Yoro		2–1				1–0	

Source: La Tribuna
Legend: Blue = home team win; Yellow = draw; Red = away team win.

North: Group B
Home \ Away	JUN	MUN	HON	OOC	PAR	RJU	SUL	VIL
Atlético Junior		1–3	1–0		2–3	0–0	1–0	0–1
Atlético Municipal				4–1		2–1		
Honduras		1–1			2–2		4–1	
Olimpia Occidental		3–3			1–0	2–0		
Parrillas One			3–3					1–1
Real Juventud	0–2		1–1				3–2	
Sula			2–1			1–0		
Villanueva	0–2	2–0	1–1		1–1	5–2	1–1	

Source: La Tribuna
Legend: Blue = home team win; Yellow = draw; Red = away team win.

South: Group A
Home \ Away	AES	AIN	HIS	MPA	MAR	UPN
Atlético Esperanzano						
Atlético Independiente						
Hispano						4–0
Municipal Paceño						
Marcala						
UPNFM		2–1				

Source: La Tribuna
Legend: Blue = home team win; Yellow = draw; Red = away team win.

South: Group B
Home \ Away	ALI	OLA	PIN	JUT	OLI	NSI	VAL
Alianza							2–1
Atlético Olanchano						5–1	
Atlético Pinares							
Juticalpa							
Olimpia B		1–0					
Nuevo San Isidro							
Valencia		2–1					

Source: La Tribuna
Legend: Blue = home team win; Yellow = draw; Red = away team win.

=== Quarterfinals ===
==== Real Sociedad vs UPNFM ====
4 November 2011 1st leg	UPNFM	2–1	Real Sociedad	Tegucigalpa, Francisco Morazán
11:00 (UTC−06:00)	Guevara	Report	González

13 November 2011 2nd leg	Real Sociedad	3–1	UPNFM	Tocoa, Colón
14:00 (UTC−06:00)				Stadium: Estadio Francisco Martínez Durón

- Real Sociedad won 4–3 on aggregate.

==== Hispano vs Social Sol ====
6 November 2011 1st leg	Social Sol	1–1	Hispano	Coyoles Central, Yoro
15:00 (UTC−06:00)

12 November 2011 2nd leg	Hispano	2–1	Social Sol	Comayagua, Comayagua
19:00 (UTC−06:00)	Torres 12' da Silva 35'	Report	Patiño	Stadium: Estadio Carlos Miranda

- Hispano won 3–2 on aggregate.

==== Juticalpa vs Parrillas One ====
6 November 2011 1st leg	Parrillas One	2–1	Juticalpa	San Pedro Sula, Cortés
15:00 (UTC−06:00)	Quinn 30'; Martínez ?' (pen.)		Ocampo 47'	Stadium: Estadio Olímpico Metropolitano

13 November 2011 2nd leg	Juticalpa	2–2	Parrillas One	Juticalpa, Olancho
14:00 (UTC−06:00)				Stadium: Estadio Celio Guifarro

- Parrillas One won 4–3 on aggregate.

==== Atlético Municipal vs Atlético Pinares ====
6 November 2011 1st leg	Atlético Pinares	0–5	Atlético Municipal	San Marcos de Colón, Choluteca
14:00 (UTC−06:00)

13 November 2011 2nd leg	Atlético Municipal	5–0	Atlético Pinares	Santa Cruz de Yojoa, Cortés
15:00 (UTC−06:00)

- Atlético Municipal won 10–0 on aggregate.

=== Semifinals ===
==== Real Sociedad vs Parrillas One ====
20 November 2011 1st leg	Parrillas One	1–2	Real Sociedad	San Pedro Sula, Cortés
15:00 (UTC−06:00)				Stadium: Estadio Olímpico Metropolitano

27 November 2011 2nd leg	Real Sociedad	3–0	Parrillas One	Tocoa, Colón
14:00 (UTC−06:00)				Stadium: Estadio Francisco Martínez Durón

- Real Sociedad won 5–1 on aggregate score.

==== Hispano vs Atlético Municipal ====
20 November 2011 1st leg	Atlético Municipal	1–2	Hispano	Santa Cruz de Yojoa, Cortés
(UTC−06:00)			Jorge Ramirez 49'; Fredy 76'	Stadium: Estadio Álex Pineda Chacón; Referee: Ronald Hernández

26 November 2011 2nd leg	Hispano	1–2 (a.e.t.) (4–5 p)	Atlético Municipal	Comayagua, Comayagua
19:30 (UTC−06:00)				Stadium: Estadio Carlos Miranda

- Hispano 3–3 Atlético Municipal on aggregate score; Atlético Municipal won 5–4 on penalty shootouts.

=== Final ===
==== Real Sociedad vs Atlético Municipal ====
4 December 2011 1st leg	Atlético Municipal	0–0	Real Sociedad	Santa Cruz de Yojoa, Cortés
(UTC−06:00)		Report		Stadium: Estadio Álex Pineda Chacón

11 December 2011 2nd leg	Real Sociedad	4–0	Atlético Municipal	Tocoa, Colón
(UTC−06:00)				Stadium: Estadio Francisco Martínez Durón

- Real Sociedad won 4–0 on aggregate score.

Liga de Ascenso
2011–12 Apertura champion

1st title

== Clausura ==
- Parrillas One defeated Real Sociedad on aggregate score.

Liga de Ascenso
2011–12 Clausura champion

2nd title

== Promotion ==
Played between C.D. Real Sociedad (winners of Apertura) and Parrillas One (winners of Clausura).

4 June 2012 Promotion	Parrillas One	0–2	Real Sociedad
CST			59' Hernández; 89' Peña
