= 2010–11 Honduran Liga Nacional de Ascenso =

Season of second-division football in Honduras

Liga Nacional de Ascenso
- Season: 2010–11
- Champions: Apertura: Parrillas One; Clausura: Atlético Choloma
- Promoted: Atlético Choloma
- Relegated: Cruz Azul
- All statistics correct as of 16 April 2011.

The 2010–11 Liga Nacional de Ascenso de Honduras season is the 32nd season of the Liga Nacional de Ascenso de Honduras, the second division of football in Honduras. It is contested by 28 teams split into two zones with two divisions each.

The season is split into two separate competitions, the Apertura and the Clausura. After the end of the Clausura, the winners of both competitions will face off against each other in order to determine the team which will earn promotion to the Liga Nacional de Fútbol de Honduras for the 2011–12 season.

== Apertura ==
=== Final round ===
==== Quarterfinals ====
===== Colinas vs Parrillas One =====
13 November 2010 1st leg	Parrillas One	3–0	Colinas	San Pedro Sula, Cortés
19:00 (UTC−06:00)				Stadium: Estadio Olímpico Metropolitano

21 November 2010 2nd leg	Colinas	1–1	Parrillas One	Danlí, El Paraíso
14:00 (UTC−06:00)	Zamora		Ferreira	Stadium: Estadio Marcelo Tinoco

- Parrillas One advanced 4–1 on aggregated score.

===== Atlético Olanchano vs Yoro =====
14 November 2010 1st leg	Yoro	3–0	Atlético Olanchano	Yoro, Yoro
14:00 (UTC−06:00)

21 November 2010 2nd leg	Atlético Olanchano	0–0	Yoro	Catacamas, Olancho
14:00 (UTC−06:00)				Stadium: Estadio Rubén Guifarro

- Yoro advanced 3–0 on aggregated score.

===== Atlético Municipal vs Juticalpa =====
14 November 2010 1st leg	Juticalpa	3–0	Atlético Municipal	Salamá, Olancho
14:00 (UTC−06:00)				Stadium: Estadio Juan Ramón Brevé Vargas

21 November 2010 2nd leg	Atlético Municipal	4–0	Juticalpa	Santa Cruz de Yojoa, Cortés
15:00 (UTC−06:00)	Pineda

- Atlético Municipal advanced 4–3 on aggregated score.

===== Sonaguera vs Atlético Esperanzano =====
14 November 2010 1st leg	Atlético Esperanzano	3–0	Sonaguera	La Esperanza, Intibucá
15:00 (UTC−06:00)				Stadium: Estadio Romualdo Bueso

21 November 2010 2nd leg	Sonaguera	2–2	Atlético Esperanzano	Sonaguera, Colón
14:00 (UTC−06:00)	Gutiérrez		Peña; Núñez

- Atlético Esperanzano advanced 5–2 on aggregated score.

==== Semifinals ====
===== Atlético Esperanzano vs Parrillas One =====
27 November 2010 1st leg	Parrillas One	2–0	Atlético Esperanzano	San Pedro Sula, Cortés
19:00 (UTC−06:00)	Ferreira 61'; Williams 89'			Stadium: Estadio Olímpico Metropolitano

4 December 2010 2nd leg	Atlético Esperanzano	1–1	Parrillas One	La Esperanza, Honduras, Intibucá
14:00 (UTC−06:00)	Paez		Ferreira	Stadium: Estadio Romualdo Bueso; Attendance: 800; Referee: Carlos Sánchez

- Parrillas One advanced 3–1 on aggregated score.

===== Atlético Municipal vs Yoro =====
28 November 2010 1st leg	Yoro	3–1	Atlético Municipal	Yoro, Yoro
14:00 (UTC−06:00)				Referee: Miguel Torres

5 December 2010 2nd leg	Atlético Municipal	2–1	Yoro	Santa Cruz de Yojoa, Cortés
15:00 (UTC−06:00)	Figueroa (?); Arteaga		Flores 85'

- Yoro advanced 4–3 on aggregated score.

==== Final ====
===== Yoro vs Parrillas One =====
10 December 2010 1st leg	Parrillas One	1–1	Yoro	Olanchito, Yoro
19:00 (UTC−06:00)

19 December 2010 2nd leg	Yoro	1–2 (a.e.t.)	Parrillas One	Yoro, Yoro
14:00 (UTC−06:00)	Urbina 75'		Suazo 18'; Ferreira 93'	Stadium: Estadio Olímpico de Yoro

- Parrillas One won 3–2 on aggregated score.

Liga Nacional
2010–11 Apertura champion

1st title

== Clausura ==
=== Regular season ===
==== Group A North ====
Pos	Team	Pld	Pts	Teams qualified
1	Real Sociedad	12	32	Qualified to the Final round
2	Yoro	12	23	Qualified to the Final round
3	Arsenal	11	18	
4	Unión Ájax	12	16	
5	Social Sol	12	14	
6	Sonaguera	12	11	
7	Importadora Rosita	12	6	

==== Group B North ====
Pos	Team	Pld	Pts	Teams qualified
1	Atlético Choloma	12	25	Qualified to the Final round
2	Atlético Municipal	12	22	Qualified to the Final round
3	Villanueva	12	18	
4	Parrillas One	12	15	
5	Atlético Junior	11	13	
6	Olimpia Occidental	12	12	
7	Cruz Azul	12	8	

==== Group A Central ====
Pos	Team	Pld	Pts	Teams qualified
1	UPNFM	8	17	Qualified to the Final round
2	Atlético Esperanzano	8	15	Qualified to the Final round
3	Atlético Independiente	8	11	
4	Olimpia B	8	10	
5	Municipal Paceño	8	1	

==== Group B Central ====
Pos	Team	Pld	Pts	Teams qualified
1	Valencia	9	19	Qualified to the Final round
2	Juticalpa	9	19	Qualified to the Final round
3	Atlético Olanchano	10	16	
4	Municipal Silca	10	14	
5	Pinares	10	14	
6	San Isidro	10	10	

=== Final round ===
==== Quarterfinals ====
===== Real Sociedad vs Atlético Esperanzano =====
30 April 2011 1st leg	Atlético Esperanzano	0–3	Real Sociedad	La Esperanza, Intibucá
15:00 (UTC−06:00)			Peña; Fernández	Stadium: Estadio Romualdo Bueso; Referee: Melvin Matamoros

7 May 2011 2nd leg	Real Sociedad	0–0	Atlético Esperanzano	Tocoa, Colón
(UTC−06:00)				Stadium: Estadio Francisco Martínez Durón

- Real Sociedad advanced 3–0 on aggregate score.

===== Atlético Choloma vs Juticalpa =====
1 May 2011 1st leg	Juticalpa	0–0	Atlético Choloma	Juticalpa, Olancho
13:00 (UTC−06:00)				Stadium: Estadio Juan Ramón Brevé Vargas; Referee: Marlon Muñoz

6 May 2011 2nd leg	Atlético Choloma	1–0	Juticalpa	Choloma, Cortés
(UTC−06:00)	García 22'			Stadium: Estadio Rubén Deras

- Atlético Choloma advanced 1–0 on aggregate score.

===== Valencia vs Yoro =====
1 May 2011 1st leg	Yoro	2–0	Valencia	Yoro, Yoro
15:00 (UTC−06:00)				Referee: Geovany Mendoza

7 May 2011 2nd leg	Valencia	1–5	Yoro	Tegucigalpa, Francisco Morazán
(UTC−06:00)				Stadium: Estadio Tiburcio Carías Andino

- Yoro advanced 7–2 on aggregate score.

===== UPNFM vs Atlético Municipal =====
1 May 2011 1st leg	Atlético Municipal	1–0	UPNFM	Santa Cruz de Yojoa, Cortés
15:00 (UTC−06:00)	Figueroa 90'			Referee: Óscar Hernández

6 May 2011 1st leg	UPNFM	2–2	Atlético Municipal	Tegucigalpa, Francisco Morazán
14:00 (UTC−06:00)	Canales 52'; Núñez 90'		Figueroa 49' 61'	Stadium: Estadio Tiburcio Carías Andino

- Atlético Municipal advanced 3–2 on aggregate score.

==== Semifinals ====
===== Atlético Choloma vs Yoro =====
15 May 2011 1st leg	Yoro	1–1	Atlético Choloma	Yoro, Yoro
14:00 (UTC−06:00)	Vega		Cáceres	Stadium: Estadio Olímpico de Yoro

20 May 2011 2nd leg	Atlético Choloma	2–2 (4–1 p)	Yoro	Choloma, Cortés
(UTC−06:00)	Cáceres		Vega	Stadium: Estadio Rubén Deras

- Atlético Choloma 3–3 Yoro on aggregate score; Atlético Choloma won 4–1 on penalty shootouts.

===== Real Sociedad vs Atlético Municipal =====
15 May 2011 1st leg	Atlético Municipal	1–1	Real Sociedad	Santa Cruz de Yojoa, Cortés
15:00 (UTC−06:00)	Mencía		Hernández	Stadium: Estadio Municipal Alex Pineda Chacón

22 May 2011 2nd leg	Real Sociedad	2–1	Atlético Municipal	Tocoa, Colón
(UTC−06:00)	Hernández 15'; Fernández 66'		Flores 54'	Stadium: Estadio Francisco Martínez Durón; Referee: Óscar Hernández

- Real Sociedad won 3–2 on aggregate score.

==== Final ====
===== Real Sociedad vs Atlético Choloma =====
27 May 2011 1st leg	Atlético Choloma	3–1	Real Sociedad	Choloma, Cortés
(UTC−06:00)	García 25'; Cáceres 44' 89'		Hernández 46'	Stadium: Estadio Rubén Deras; Referee: Armando Castro

5 June 2011 2nd leg	Real Sociedad	2–0 (a.e.t.) (4–5 p)	Atlético Choloma	Tocoa, Colón
14:00 (UTC−06:00)	Hernández; Milán			Stadium: Estadio Francisco Martínez Durón
	Penalties
	Clark; Peña; Matute; Melgar; Maradiaga (penalty missed)		Zepeda; Oviedo; Álvarez; Bonilla; Arzú

- Real Sociedad 3–3 Atlético Choloma on aggregate score; Atlético Choloma won 5–4 on penalty shootouts.

Liga de Ascenso
2010–11 Clausura champion

1st title

== Promotion ==
To be played between Parrillas One and Atlético Choloma, winners of Apertura and Clausura tournaments respectively.

=== Final ===
==== Atlético Choloma vs Parrillas One ====
11 June 2011 1st leg	Parrillas One	1–1	Atlético Choloma	San Pedro Sula, Cortés
19:00 (UTC−06:00)	Diego 64'		Valerio 4'	Stadium: Estadio Francisco Morazán

18 June 2011 2nd leg	Atlético Choloma	1–0	Parrillas One	Choloma, Cortés
(UTC−06:00)	Sandoval 78'			Stadium: Estadio Rubén Deras

- Atlético Choloma won 2–1 on aggregate score.

Liga Nacional
2010–11 Clausura champion

1st title
