= 2015 Honduran Cup =

Honduran Cup
Copa Presidente

Tournament details
- Country: Honduras
- Dates: 7 February–9 May
- Teams: 64

Final positions
- Champions: Olimpia
- Runners-up: Platense
- Third place: Motagua
- Fourth place: Villanueva

Tournament statistics
- Matches played: 70
- Goals scored: 221 (3.16 per match)
- All statistics correct as of 9 May 2015.

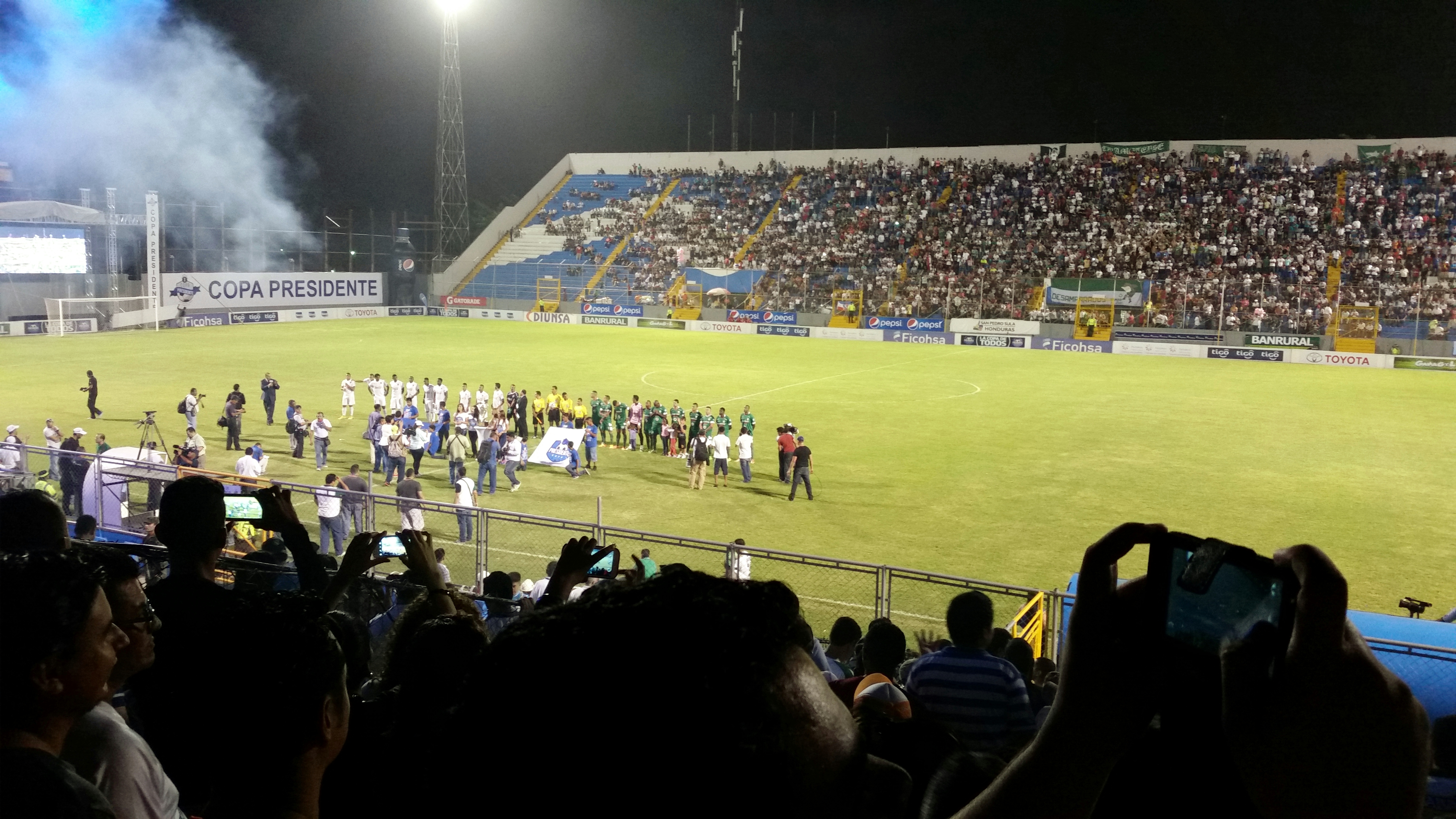
President's Cup 2015 Final game in San Pedro Sula, Honduras.

The 2015 Honduran Cup was the 10th staging of the Honduran Cup and the first edition since 1998. Club Deportivo Olimpia are the defending champions. The 2015 Honduran Cup is referred to as the Copa Presidente de Honduras for sponsorship reasons. The cup is a creation of the Honduran government funded by money allocated to national security fund. Its purpose is to support the growth of sport to detract the youth from vices and to promote national tourism for rural towns.

The cup was contested by 64 teams from the top 3 divisions of the country. There was a total of 10 teams from La Liga Nacional (First Division), 27 from Liga de Ascenso (Second Division) and 27 from Liga Mayor (Third Division). It was the first cup in which teams outside the top division participated. Some stipulations included that the lower seeded team hosted the matchup and five substitutions were allowed. The first 4 rounds were single match with penalties if match ended in ties. The quarterfinal and semifinal rounds were home-and-away while the one-match final was hosted in a neutral venue.

== Participants ==
Liga Nacional

Honduras Progreso (El Progreso, Yoro)
Marathón (San Pedro Sula, Cortes)
Motagua (Tegucigalpa, Francisco Morazan)
Olimpia (Tegucigalpa, Francisco Morazan)
Parrillas One (Siguatepeque, Comayagua)

Platense (Puerto Cortes, Cortes)
Real España (San Pedro Sula, Cortes)
Real Sociedad (Tocoa, Colon)
Victoria (La Ceiba, Atlantida)
Vida (La Ceiba, Atlantida)

Liga de Ascenso

Alianza Becerra (San Francisco de Becerra, Francisco Morazan)
Arsenal (Coxen Hole, Roatan)
Atlético Choloma (Choloma, Cortes)
Atlético Esperanzano (La Esperanza, Intibuca)
Atlético Independiente (Siguatepeque, Comayagua)
Atlético Limeño (La Lima, Cortes)
Atlético Municipal (Santa Cruz de Yojoa, Cortes)
Atlético Olanchano (Catacamas, Olancho)
Comayagua (Comayagua, Comayagua)
Deportes Savio (Santa Rosa de Copan, Copan)
Espartano (San Jose de Colinas, Santa Barbara)
Graciano San Francisco (Gracias, Lempira)
Jaguares UPNFM (Tegucigalpa, Francisco Morazan)

Juticalpa (Juticalpa, Olancho)
Lepaera (Lepaera, Lempira)
Marcala (Marcala, Choluteca)
Nacional Villanueva (Villanueva, Cortes)
Real Honduras (San Luis, Santa Barbara)
Real Juventud (Santa Barbara, Santa Barbara)
San Juan (Quimistán, Santa Barbara)
Social Sol (Olanchito, Yoro)
Tela (Tela, Atlantida)
Trujillo (Trujillo, Colon)
Valle (Nacaome, Valle)
Villanueva (Villanueva, Cortes)
Yoro (Yoro, Yoro)

Liga Mayor

Atlético Boca Júnior (Tocoa, Colon)
Atlético Calvario (Langue, Valle)
Atlético Normalista (Gracias, Lempira)
Barros (Cofradia, Cortes)
Brisas (Taulabe, Comayagua)
Casmul (San Manuel, Cortes)
Concepción (San Marcos, Ocotepeque)
Estrella Roja (Danli, El Paraiso)
FAS (Santiago de Puringla, La Paz)
Galaxis (Coxen Hole, Roatan)
Gimnástico (Tegucigalpa, Francisco Morazan)
Gracias a Dios (Puerto Lempira, Gracias a Dios)
Independiente (Monjaras, Choluteca)

Juventus (Guaimaca, Francisco Morazan)
Las Mercedes (La Ceiba, Atlantida)
Lenca
Merari (Santa Rosa de Copan, Copan)
Merendón (Azacualpa, Santa Barbara)
Oro Verde (El Paraíso) (Oro Verde, El Paraiso)
Oro Verde (Santa Rita) (Santa Rita, Yoro)
Palmeras (Sonaguera, Colon)
Rayos (La Entrada, Copan)
San José Clash (San Jose Pueblo, Atlantida)
San Juan Bosco (Choluteca, Choluteca)
San Lorenzo (San Lorenzo, Valle)
Sulimán (Juticalpa, Olancho)

== Schedule and format ==
The first round schedule was announced on 14 November 2014. The final will be a single match to be held at Estadio Nilmo Edwards in La Ceiba.

Round	Date		Fixtures	Clubs
Round	First leg	Second leg	Fixtures	Clubs
First round	7–8 February		32	64 → 32
Second round	25–26 February		16	32 → 16
Round of 16	18 March		8	16 → 8
Quarterfinals	25 March	28 March	8	8 → 4
Semifinals	31 March & 1 April	22 April & 29 April	4	4 → 2
Final	9 May		1	2 → 1

== Prize fund ==
Round	Prize fund per club
Third Place Team	L. 200,000
Second Place Team	L. 300,000
2015 Honduran Cup Winner	L. 500,000

== First round ==
7 February 2015 First round	Estrella Roja	0–5	Olimpia	Estadio Marcelo Tinoco
			40' Elvir; 63' Leguizamón; 64' Johnson; 81' 84' Estupiñán

7 February 2015 First round	Alianza Becerra	0–1	Motagua	Estadio Alfredo Hawit Banegas
			30' Núñez

7 February 2015 First round	San Lorenzo	2–2	Valle	Estadio Ángel Augusto Martínez

7 February 2015 First round	San Juan Bosco	0–1	Atlético Esperanzano	Estadio Fausto Flores Lagos

7 February 2015 First round	FAS	1–2	Atlético Olanchano	Estadio Municipal

7 February 2015 First round	Brisas	1–1	Español	Estadio Rafael Leonardo Callejas

7 February 2015 First round	Independiente	1–1	Jaguares UPNFM	Estadio Evaristo Najar Romero

7 February 2015 First round	Atlético Limeño	0–1	Platense	Estadio Milton Flores

7 February 2015 First round	Palmeras	0–1	Real Sociedad	Estadio Municipal de Sonaguera

7 February 2015 First round	Atlético Boca Junior	1–4	Yoro	Estadio Roberto Martínez

7 February 2015 First round	Gracias a Dios	2–3	Real Juventud	Estadio Manuel Brom

7 February 2015 First round	Barros	1–0	Espartano	Estadio Municipal

7 February 2015 First round	Juventus	1–1	Parrillas One	Estadio Vicente Brizzio Alemán
	Rodríguez 14'		8' V. Salazar

7 February 2015 First round	Social Sol	2–4	Honduras Progreso	Estadio San Jorge
	Cárcamo 30' (pen.) 59' (pen.)		8'; 49' Isaula; 77' Alvarado; 81' Mencía

8 February 2015 First round	Gimnástico	5–0	Marcala	Estadio Emilio Larach

8 February 2015 First round	Galaxis	0–1	Lepaera	Coxen Hole Stadium

8 February 2015 First round	Arsenal	0–3	Vida	Coxen Hole Stadium

8 February 2015 First round	Atlético Normalista	1–2	San Juan	Estadio Las Delicias

8 February 2015 First round	Atlético Calvario	2–0	Valencia	Estadio Jorge Alberto Arias

8 February 2015 First round	Lenca	3–4	Atlético Independiente	Estadio Romualdo Peñalba

8 February 2015 First round	Oro Verde (El Paraíso)	0–2	Comayagua	Estadio Oro Verde

8 February 2015 First round	Real Honduras	2–1	Nacional Villanueva	Estadio Municipal de San Luis

8 February 2015 First round	Las Mercedes	0–1	Trujillo	Estadio Complejo Los Palacios

8 February 2015 First round	San José Clash	0–6	Villanueva	Estadio Carlos Calderón

8 February 2015 First round	Concepción	0–0	Atlético Choloma	Estadio Franklin Murillo

8 February 2015 First round	Rayos	0–3	Deportes Savio	Estadio Alsacias

8 February 2015 First round	Merari	0–7	Tela	Estadio Sergio Antonio Reyes

8 February 2015 First round	Merendón	0–1	Victoria	Estadio Sol de América

8 February 2015 First round	Graciano	0–3	Marathón	Estadio Las Delicias

8 February 2015 First round	Casmul	1–3	Real España	Estadio Municipal

8 February 2015 First round	Oro Verde (Yoro)	2–3	Atlético Municipal	Estadio José Leonel Espinoza

8 February 2015 First round	Sulimán	0–8	Juticalpa	Estadio Ramón Sarmiento

== Second round ==
25 February 2015 Second round	Atlético Calvario	1–4	Motagua	Estadio Jorge Alberto Arias
	Flores 85'		9' Padilla; 46' 61' Castillo; 51' López

25 February 2015 Second round	Real Honduras	0–1	Marathón	Estadio Fausto Díaz
			86' (pen.) Martínez

25 February 2015 Second round	San Juan	1–2	Honduras Progreso	Estadio Domingo Ortega
	Crisanto ?'		36' 80' Lobo

25 February 2015 Second round	Brisas	0–2	Atlético Olanchano	Estadio Rafael Leonardo Callejas

25 February 2015 Second round	Juventus	2–2	Atlético Esperanzano	Estadio Vicente Brizzio Alemán
	Ponce 1'; Rodríguez 62'		71' Ramos; 74' Majano

25 February 2015 Second round	Yoro	1–1	Real Sociedad	Estadio Olímpico Yoreño

25 February 2015 Second round	Real Juventud	2–1	Trujillo	Estadio Argelio Sabillón
	Chávez ?'; Gómez ?'		?' Zelaya

25 February 2015 Second round	Valle	5–3	Atlético Municipal	Estadio José Elías Nazar

25 February 2015 Second round	Comayagua	0–0	Juticalpa	Estadio Carlos Miranda

25 February 2015 Second round	Jaguares UPNFM	2–0	Atlético Independiente	Cancha Universidad UPNFM
	Turcios ?'; Herrera ?'

25 February 2015 Second round	Barros	0–4	Platense	Estadio Municipal
			3' Smith; 21' 60' Lalín; 79' (pen.) Flores	Referee: David Mendoza

25 February 2015 Second round	Lepaera	2–1	Tela	Estadio Juan Orlando Hernández
	Lozano ?' ?'

25 February 2015 Second round	Atlético Choloma	1–0	Vida	Estadio Rubén Deras
	Perdomo 37'

25 February 2015 Second round	Villanueva	1–0	Real España	Estadio José Adrián Cruz
	Oseguera 26'			Referee: Gerson Almendárez

26 February 2015 Second round	Gimnástico	1–6	Olimpia	Estadio Emilio Larach
	Tomé 10'		35' 75' 78' Elvir; 41' Alvarado; 77' Elis; 90+2' Morazán

26 February 2015 Second round	Deportes Savio	0–1	Victoria	Estadio Sergio Antonio Reyes
			48' Padilla

== Round of 16 ==
18 March 2015 Round of 16	Jaguares UPNFM	2–3	Platense	Cancha Universidad UPNFM
	Cubas 29'; Rodríguez 48'		17' 36' Flores; 45' Lalín

18 March 2015 Round of 16	Real Juventud	0–0	Real Sociedad	Estadio Argelio Sabillón

18 March 2015 Round of 16	Atlético Esperanzano	0–0	Valle	Estadio Romualdo Bueso

18 March 2015 Round of 16	Atlético Olanchano	1–4	Motagua	Estadio Rubén Guifarro
	Jiménez 15'		6' Gómez; 51' Rosales; 77' Silva; 88' (pen.) Izaguirre

18 March 2015 Round of 16	Atlético Choloma	0–1	Victoria	Estadio Rubén Deras
			77' Tisera

18 March 2015 Round of 16	Comayagua	1–2	Olimpia	Estadio Carlos Miranda
	Anariba 6'		10' Alvarado; 45' Johnson

18 March 2015 Round of 16	Lepaera	2–2	Honduras Progreso	Estadio Juan Orlando Hernández
	Martínez 55' 90'		6' Lobo; 50' Martínez

18 March 2015 Round of 16	Villanueva	2–0	Marathón	Estadio José Adrián Cruz
	Flores 77'; Moncada 90+2'

== Quarterfinals ==
The draw was done at President's House on 20 March.

=== 1st legs ===
25 March 2015 Quarterfinals	Atlético Esperanzano	3–2	Motagua	Estadio Romualdo Bueso
	Flores 22'; Ramos 25'; Garay 84' (pen.)		37' Silva; 87' (pen.) Izaguirre

25 March 2015 Quarterfinals	Real Juventud	0–1	Olimpia	Estadio Argelio Sabillón
			54' Flores

25 March 2015 Quarterfinals	Villanueva	2–0	Victoria	Estadio José Adrián Cruz
	Zelaya 63'; Rápalo 67' (pen.)			Referee: David Cruz

25 March 2015 Quarterfinals	Platense	4–1	Honduras Progreso	Estadio Excélsior
	de León 6' 22' 27' 72' (pen.)		67' (pen.) Alvarado

=== 2nd legs ===
28 March 2015 Quarterfinals	Motagua	3–0	Atlético Esperanzano	Estadio Rubén Guifarro
	Reyna 29'; Elvir 45'; Gómez 61'

28 March 2015 Quarterfinals	Olimpia	2–1	Real Juventud	Estadio Marco Agusto Hernández
	Quioto 11' 32'		74' Chávez

28 March 2015 Quarterfinals	Honduras Progreso	3–2	Platense	Estadio Humberto Micheletti
	Arriola 36' 76'; Anariba 81'		19' Álvarez; 69' Flores

28 March 2015 Quarterfinals	Victoria	2–1	Villanueva	Estadio Nilmo Edwards
	Crisanto 1'; Güity 79'		41' Solórzano	Referee: Miguel Torres

== Semifinals ==
=== 1st legs ===
31 March 2015 Semifinals	Villanueva	1–2	Olimpia	Estadio José Adrián Cruz
	Rápalo 53'		8' 78' Estupiñán

1 April 2015 Semifinals	Platense	2–1	Motagua	Estadio Excélsior
	Aguilar 34'; Lalín 49'		85' Izaguirre

=== 2nd legs ===
22 April 2015 Semifinals	Olimpia	4–1	Villanueva	Estadio Tiburcio Carías Andino
	Elvir 20' 50' 62'; Solórzano 61' (o.g.)		52' (o.g.) Acevedo

29 April 2015 Semifinals	Motagua	1–1	Platense	Estadio Tiburcio Carías Andino
	Izaguirre 59' (pen.)		74' (pen.) Abadía	Referee: Óscar Moncada

== Third Place ==
8 May 2015 Third Place	Motagua	4–3	Villanueva	Estadio Roberto Martínez Ávila
	Izaguirre ?' (pen.); Grant 46'; Rosales 57'; Crisanto 80' (pen.)		45' 69' Zelaya; 55' Oseguera	Referee: Héctor Rodríguez

== Final ==
9 May 2015 Final	Olimpia	3–1	Platense	Estadio Francisco Morazán
	Mejía 12'; Quioto 27' de Souza ?'		40' (pen.) Abadía	Referee: Raúl Castro
