= 2015–16 Honduran Liga Nacional de Ascenso =

Liga de Ascenso
- Season: 2015–16
- Champions: Apertura: Social Sol; Clausura: Alianza Becerra
- Promoted: Social Sol

The 2015–16 Liga Nacional de Ascenso de Honduras season is divided into two tournaments named Apertura and Clausura. The Liga Nacional de Ascenso de Honduras is the second-tier football league of Honduras and decides the team to be promoted to the 2016–17 Honduran Liga Nacional.

== Clausura ==
=== Standings ===
Pos	Team	Pld	W	D	L	GF	GA	GD	Pts
1	Social Sol	14	11	1	2	20	8	+12	34
2	Tela	14	10	1	3	25	9	+16	31
3	Trujillo	14	6	2	6	19	20	−1	20
4	Atlético Limeño	14	5	4	5	15	14	+1	19
5	Yoro	14	4	4	6	17	18	−1	16
6	Villanueva	14	4	4	6	14	16	−2	16
7	Arsenal	14	3	3	8	15	28	−13	12
8	Boca Juniors	14	1	5	8	10	22	−12	8

Pos	Team	Pld	W	D	L	GF	GA	GD	Pts
1	Lepaera	14	10	0	4	31	13	+18	30
2	Parrillas One	14	7	5	2	24	13	+11	26
3	Atlético Choloma	14	8	2	4	27	19	+8	26
4	Atlético Municipal	14	8	2	4	25	20	+5	26
5	Deportes Savio	14	6	2	6	23	13	+10	20
6	Espartano	14	3	4	7	14	21	−7	13
7	Olimpia Occidental	14	2	4	8	16	28	−12	10
8	Real Juventud	14	1	3	10	13	46	−33	6

Pos	Team	Pld	W	D	L	GF	GA	GD	Pts
1	Jaguares UPNFM	9	6	1	2	20	6	+14	19
2	Atlético Independiente	8	4	3	1	13	9	+4	15
3	Comayagua	8	3	2	3	13	14	−1	11
4	Atlético Esperanzano	9	1	3	5	7	13	−6	6
5	Municipal Valencia	8	1	3	4	9	20	−11	6

Pos	Team	Pld	W	D	L	GF	GA	GD	Pts
1	Alianza Becerra	8	5	1	2	17	7	+10	16
2	Gimnástico	8	5	1	2	17	8	+9	16
3	Valle	8	4	0	4	12	10	+2	12
4	Español	8	2	2	4	9	16	−7	8
5	Atlético Olanchano	8	2	0	6	8	22	−14	6

== Promotion ==
Social Sol and Alianza Becerra and winners of Apertura and Clausura respectively, had to play a single match for the promotion to Honduran Liga Nacional. Social Sol gained promotion after defeating Alianza Becerra in penalty shoot-outs after a 1–1 draw during 120 minutes of play.

12 June 2016 Promotion play-off	Alianza Becerra	1–1 (a.e.t.) (6–7 p)	Social Sol	San Pedro Sula, Cortés
14:30 CST	Mina 72'		4' (o.g.) Nájera	Stadium: Estadio Olímpico Metropolitano; Attendance: 4,500
	Penalties
	Ramírez (penalty scored); García (penalty scored); Oseguera (penalty missed); Cálix (penalty scored); Mina (penalty scored); Romero (penalty scored); Sambulá (penalty missed); Nájera (penalty scored)		(penalty scored) O. Martínez; (penalty scored) Orellana; (penalty scored) López; (penalty scored) Benedith; (penalty missed) K. Cárcamo; (penalty scored) S. Martínez; (penalty scored) Fernández; (penalty scored) A. Cárcamo
