= Miss Grand Honduras 2024 =

September 2023 beauty pageant

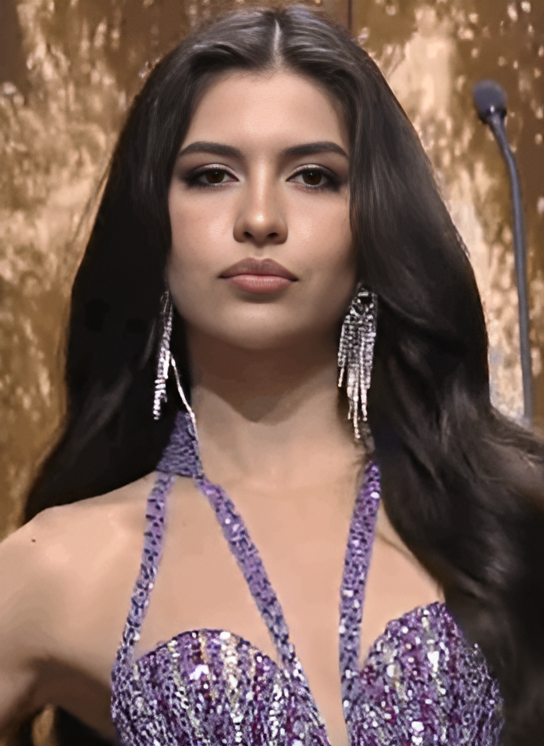
- Yariela García, Miss Grand Honduras 2024 (Assumed)
- Date: September 16, 2023
- Presenters: José Roberto Padilla
- Venue: Centro de Convenciones Honduras Maya, Tegucigalpa
- Broadcaster: YouTube; Facebook
- Entrants: 16
- Placements: 10
- Withdrawals: Lempira; Ocotepeque
- Winner: Cecilia García (Resigned) (Francisco Morazán)

Miss Grand Honduras 2024 was the second edition of the Miss Grand Honduras pageant, held on September 16, 2023, at the Centro de Convenciones Honduras Maya, Tegucigalpa. Sixteen candidates, who qualified for the national final round through an online profile screening, competed for the title, of whom a 20-year-old audiovisual and advertising communication student representing Francisco Morazán, Cecilia García, was announced the winner.

Cecilia was expected to represent the country at Miss Grand International 2024 in Myanmar, but later resigned from the title in May 2024; safety concerns due to the host country's civil war were claimed. Yariela García, who was the top 10 finalist in the Miss Grand Honduras 2022, was then elected as the replacement through an audition organized in June 2024.

In addition to the main winner, the first runner-up, Abigail Rovelo, will be sent to compete in Miss Expo World 2024 in Guatemala, while the second runner-up, Alejandra Espino, will represent the country at the Miss Teenager Universe 2024 pageant.

The pageant's grand final competition was attended by Miss Grand International 2017, María José Lora of Peru, and Miss Grand International 2019, Valentina Figuera of Venezuela.

== Result ==
Miss Grand Honduras 2024 competition result by department
Colors key
Winner	Fourth runner-up
First runner-up	Top 10
Second runner-up	Unplaced
Third runner-up	Withdrew

External videos
- Miss Grand Honduras 2023 Grand Final Competition, on September 16, 2023, YouTube video

Miss Grand Honduras 2024 competition result
Position	Delegate
Miss Grand Honduras 2024	Francisco Morazán – Cecilia García (Resigned)
1st runner-up	Intibucá – Abigail Rovelo
2nd runner-up	Copán – Alejandra Espino
3rd runner-up	Atlántida – Layisha Serrano
4th runner-up	Santa Bárbara – Nathaly Michell Rivera
Top 10	Choluteca – Angie Gabriela Vigil; Cortés – Soany Maldonado; La Paz – Ivania Funes; Olancho – Daniela Mejia; Valle – Beatris Funez

== Candidates ==
Originally, eighteen candidates confirmed to participate, but the representatives of Lempira and Ocotepeque withdrew, making the finalized total of sixteen contestants.

- Atlántida – Layisha Serrano
- Choluteca – Angie Gabriela Vigil
- Colón – Niricha Williams
- Comayagua – Alejandra Diaz Oviedo
- Copán – Alejandra Espino
- Cortés – Soany Maldonado
- El Paraíso – Jessy Avila
- Francisco Morazán – Cecilia García
- Gracias a Dios – Elizabeth Maldonado
- Intibucá – Abigail Rovelo
- Islas de la Bahía – Grace Banegas
- La Paz – Ivania Funes
- Lempira – Samantha Cáceres (withdrew)
- Ocotepeque – Alejandra Ticas (withdrew)
- Olancho – Daniela Mejia
- Santa Bárbara – Nathaly Michell Rivera
- Valle – Beatris Funez
- Yoro – Paola Bardales Funes
