= Luan Andrade =

Brazilian footballer (born 1990)

Personal information
- Full name: Luan Andrade Santana
- Date of birth: 6 April 1990 (age 36)
- Place of birth: Guarujá, São Paulo, Brazil
- Height: 1.77 m (5 ft 10 in)
- Positions: Right-back; midfielder

Youth career
- 2001–2004: Portuguesa Santista
- 2005–2007: Corinthians
- 2007–2008: Santos
- 2008: Porto
- 2008: Benfica
- 2008–2009: Feirense
- 2009: Goiás
- 2010–2011: Bragantino

Senior career*
Years	Team	Apps	(Gls)
2011	Santacruzense	0	(0)
2012	Sete de Junho		
2012–2013	Unión Sabá	0	(0)
2013	Grêmio Barueri	0	(0)
2013	XV de Piracicaba	0	(0)
2014	Marcílio Dias		
2014	São José	10	(0)
2015	Inter de Limeira	18	(0)
2015	Brasiliense		
2016	Paracatu	10	(0)
2016	Fernandópolis		
2016–2017	Ceilândia	2	(0)
2018	Sobradinho	12	(2)
2018	Madureira	1	(0)
2018	América-GO		
2019	Real Brasília	5	(0)
2019	Anapolina	2	(0)
2020	Central	0	(0)
2022	Gama	3	(0)
- * Club domestic league appearances and goals

Luan Andrade Santana (born 6 April 1990) is a Brazilian former footballer who played predominantly as a right-back.

== Career ==
=== Joga 10 and early career ===
Andrade was born in Guarujá, in the Brazilian state of São Paulo. He played in the academy of Portuguesa Santista during his youth. While watching television with his grandmother in her home in Paecará, Guarujá, Andrade saw an advertisement for an upcoming reality show, Joga 10, in which a number of boys would compete to earn a contract with professional football club, Corinthians. Despite his mother's encouragement, he initially doubted himself, but applied regardless.

He attended an initial screening at Corinthians' Parque São Jorge headquarters, where he was selected as one of forty-three boys from the 4,082 who applied to continue to psychological tests. Having also passed these, he became one of twenty-two finalists who would go on to star on the show. As the competition progressed, Andrade was one of the four finalists, and impressed judges, and former footballers, Dunga, Bebeto and Mário Zagallo to win the competition.

He began training with Corinthians, the club he had supported growing up, on 22 August 2005, and having impressed coach Jorge Saran, he was added to the club's under-16 side. However, he eventually fell out of favour at the club, and in early 2007 he moved to Santos.

A year later he was approached by Portuguese side Porto, and made the move to Portugal to begin training with the side. However, he moved to Benfica shortly after, before joining Feirense in the same year. He signed his first professional contract with Feirense, but was unable to break into the first-team during his year-and-a-half with the club. He returned to Brazil in 2009, initially joining Goiás, before playing for Bragantino until 2012.

=== Professional career ===
Having represented Sete de Junho in the Campeonato Sergipano, Andrade was approached by a businessman who had watched him play, and was invited to move to Honduras to join Liga Nacional de Ascenso side Unión Sabá. However, due to issues with his registration, he was unable to play during his five months with the club, and returned to Brazil in 2013, later stating that he had considered giving up playing football at this point.

He had a brief stint with Grêmio Barueri, where he was involved in the club's preparations for the Campeonato Paulista, playing in a friendly match against Santos, where he was tasked with marking Brazilian international Neymar. Later in the same year, he signed for XV de Piracicaba. A short spell with Marcílio Dias followed, before spending the 2014 season with São José, and signing with Inter de Limeira ahead of the 2015 season.

Andrade spent the second half of the 2015 season with Brasiliense, before spending the following year with both Paracatu and Ceilândia. Quiet spells with Sobradinho, Madureira, América-GO, Real Brasília and Anapolina followed, before he joined Central for the 2020 season. Having failed to make an appearance for Central, he joined Gama for the 2022 edition of the Campeonato Brasiliense.

== Career statistics ==
=== Club ===
Appearances and goals by club, season and competition
Club	Season	League			State League		Cup		Other		Total	
Club	Season	Division	Apps	Goals	Apps	Goals	Apps	Goals	Apps	Goals	Apps	Goals
Santacruzense	2011	–			0	0	0	0	5 (Note: Appearances in the Copa Paulista)	0	5	0
Unión Sabá	2012–13	Liga Nacional de Ascenso	0	0	–		0	0	0	0	0	0
Grêmio Barueri	2013	Série C	0	0	0	0	0	0	0	0	0	0
XV de Piracicaba	2013	–			0	0	0	0	1	0	1	0
São José	2014	–			10 (Note: Appearances in the Campeonato Paulista A2)	0	0	0	19	2	29	2
Inter de Limeira	2014	–			18 (Note: Appearances in the Campeonato Paulista A3)	0	0	0	0	0	18	0
Paracatu	2016	–			10 (Note: Appearances in the Campeonato Brasiliense)	0	0	0	0	0	10	0
Ceilândia	2016	Série D	2	0	0	0	0	0	0	0	2	0
Ceilândia	2017	Série D	0	0	0	0	0	0	0	0	0	0
Ceilândia	Total		2	0	0	0	0	0	0	0	2	0
Sobradinho	2018	–			12	2	0	0	0	0	12	2
Madureira	2018	Série D	1	0	0	0	0	0	0	0	1	0
Real Brasília	2019	–			5	0	0	0	0	0	5	0
Anapolina	2019	Série D	2	0	0	0	0	0	0	0	2	0
Central	2020	Série D	0	0	0	0	0	0	0	0	0	0
Gama	2022	–			3	0	0	0	0	0	3	0
Career total			5	0	58	2	0	0	25	2	88	4
