= 2001–02 Honduran Segunda División =

Honduran Segunda División
- Season: 2001–02
- Champions: Honduras Salzburg
- Promoted: Honduras Salzburg
- All statistics correct as of 12 April 2002.

The 2001–02 Honduran Segunda División was the 35th season of the Honduran Segunda División. Under the management of Javier Padilla, Honduras Salzburg won the tournament after defeating Parrillas One in the final series and obtained promotion to the 2002–03 Honduran Liga Nacional.

== Movements ==
Upcoming	Outgoing
C.D. Broncos (R)	Yoro F.C.
Parrillas One	Palestino F.C.
Platense Pumas	

== Final ==
7 April 2002 1st leg	Parrillas One	2-1	Honduras Salzburg
	Goal		(Pen.)

13 April 2002 2nd leg	Honduras Salzburg	2-1 (5-3)	Parrillas One	El Progreso, Yoro
	Goal		Goal	Stadium: Estadio Humberto Micheletti

- Honduras Salzburg 3–3 Parrillas One on aggregated. Honduras Salzburg won 5–3 on penalty shoot-outs.
