= Escalera =

Escalera is a Spanish surname. Notable people with the surname include:

- Alfredo Escalera (born 1952), Puerto Rican boxer
- Alfredo L. Escalera (born 1995), Puerto Rican baseball player
- Carlos Escalera (born 1979), Puerto Rican baseball player
- Katia Escalera, Bolivian singer
- Nino Escalera (1929–2021), Puerto Rican baseball player
- Rodolfo Escalera (1929–2000), Mexican-American artist
- Irene Cara Escalera (1959-2022), American singer, songwriter, and actress

== See also ==
- Carlos Escaleras (1958–1997), Honduran politician and activist
