= Miss Grand Honduras 2022 =

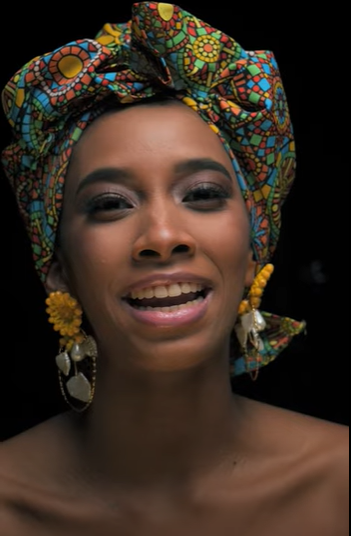
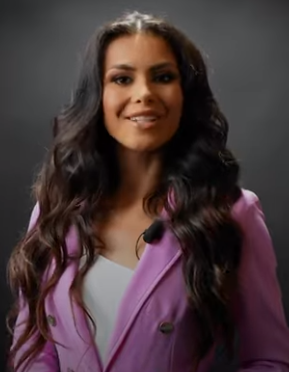
- Saira Cacho; Miss Grand Honduras 2022 Britthany Marroquin; Miss Grand Honduras; 2023
- Date: 10 July 2022
- Presenters: José Roberto Padilla
- Venue: La Galería, Tegucigalpa, Honduras
- Broadcaster: Channel 8, YouTube, Facebook Live
- Entrants: 18
- Placements: 10
- Winner: Saira Cacho Álvarez (Colón); Britthany Marroquin (Copán)
- Reina del Cacao Honduras: Maryann Espinoza (Atlántida)

External videos
- Grand Final Competition

Miss Grand Honduras 2022 was the inaugural edition of the Miss Grand Honduras beauty pageant, held at La Galería in Tegucigalpa on July 10, 2022. Eighteen candidates representing 18 departments of Honduras competed for the national title, of whom Saira Cacho Álvarez of Colón Department was named the winner. She then represented the country at the Miss Grand International 2022 pageant held on October 25 in Indonesia, where she was placed among the top 20 finalists, making her the first Honduran representative to obtain the position at Miss Grand International.

In addition to crowning the 2022 representative, Honduran candidates for the Miss Grand International 2023 and Reina Internacional del Cacao 2022 pageants, Britthany Marroquin of Copán and Maryann Espinoza of Atlántida, were respectively determined in the same event.

The event was hosted by José Roberto Padilla, and was highlighted by the live performances of several artists including Moises Aguilar, Kennia Mondragon, Angie Núñez, and Shirley Paz.

== Competition ==
In the grand final competition held on July 10, the results of the preliminary competition— which consisted of the swimsuit and evening gown competition, and the closed-door interview, determined the 10 semifinalists selected at large. The top 10 competed in the question/answer portion and were narrowed down to the top 5, who then delivered a speech related to the pageant campaign, Stop wars and violence. After which Miss Grand Honduras 2022, her two runners-up as well as the other two supplementary titleholders, Miss Grand Honduras 2023 and Reina del Cacao Honduras 2022, were announced.

== Results summary ==
=== Main placements ===
Miss Grand Honduras 2022 competition result by department
Winners	Top 10
1st runner-up	Unplaced
2nd runner-up	Did not participate

Miss Grand Honduras 2022 competition result
Position	Delegate
Miss Grand Honduras 2022	Colón – Saira Cacho Álvarez
Miss Grand Honduras 2023	Copán – Britthany Marroquin
Reina del Cacao Honduras 2022	Atlántida – Maryann Espinoza
1st runner-up	Olancho – Isabel Durón
2nd runner-up	Cortés – Nasifa Gabrie
Top 10	Choluteca – Suany Izaguirre; Gracias a Dios – Kate Allen; Islas de la Bahía – Kendy Grant; Francisco Morazán – Yariela García; Yoro – Valeria Cardona

=== Special awards ===
List of Miss Grand Honduras 2022 Special Award Winners
Award	Winner
Miss Friendship	Atlántida – Maryann Espinoza
Miss Photogenic	Ocotepeque – Tessy Ara Koh
Miss Elegance	Islas de la Bahía – Kendy Grant
Best Evening Gown	Colón – Saira Cacho
Best Shape	Copán – Brittany Marroquín

== Candidates ==
18 delegates were qualified to compete for the national title of Miss Grand Honduras 2022.

Department	Candidate
Atlántida	Maryann Espinoza
Choluteca	Suany Izaguirre
Colón	Saira Cacho
Comayagua	Josie Castellanos
Copán	Britthany Marroquín
Cortés	Nasifa Gabrie
El Paraíso	Daniela Coello
Francisco Morazán	Yariela García
Gracias a Dios	Kate Allen
Intibucá	Genesis Medina
Islas de la Bahía	Kendy Grant
La Paz	Marilyn Madrid
Lempira	Alma Gracía
Ocotepeque	Tessy Ara Koh
Olancho	Isabel Durón
Santa Bárbara	Danielle Venegas
Valle	Keren Guevara
Yoro	Valeria Cardona
