= Juan López (activist) =

Honduran environmental activist (1978–2024)

- Born: 1978; Honduras
- Died: 14 September 2024 (aged 45–46); Tocoa, Colón Department, Honduras
- Cause of death: Shot
- Occupation: Land rights activist
- Years active: 2015–2024
- Employer: Diocese of Trujillo
- Organization(s): Municipal Committee for the Defence of Common and Public Goods
- Known for: Defence of the Montaña de Botaderos Carlos Escaleras National Park
- Political party: Liberty and Refoundation
- Criminal charges: Illegal protest
- Criminal penalty: None

Juan Antonio López (c. 1978 – 14 September 2024) was a Honduran environmental activist. He was known for his activism in support of the protection of the Montaña de Botaderos Carlos Escaleras National Park against iron ore mining. López was assassinated outside a church in 2024 in what human rights groups have described as a politically motivated killing.

== Biography ==
López was born in Honduras and moved to Bajo Aguán as a child when his parents were searching for work. He settled in Tocoa, Colón Department, where he was an active member of civil society, including serving on the city council as a member of the Liberty and Refoundation political party, and coordinating social pastoral care for the Diocese of Trujillo.

== Activism ==
=== Context ===
Bajo Aguán contains the Montaña de Botaderos Carlos Escaleras National Park, which had been established by the Honduran government in 2012 in order to protect the area from the impact of heavy industries including mining. The park was named after Carlos Escaleras, an environmental activist from Tocoa who had been assassinated in 1997. In 2013, the National Congress of Honduras altered the extent of the park, increasing its buffer zones and decreasing the size of its protected areas as a result; permits were subsequently granted for mining within the buffer zones to EMCO Holdings, Inversiones Los Pinares and Ecotek, which overlapped with the park's boundaries. In 2024, amid significant public pressure, the National Congress approved a decree to resume the former boundaries of the park, though the implementation of this decree had not occurred as of September 2025.

=== Establishment of the Municipal Committee for the Defence of Common and Public Goods ===
In 2015, López co-founded the led the Municipal Committee for the Defence of Common and Public Goods (Spanish: Comité Municipal de Bienes Comunes y Públicos, CMDBCP), a group of Catholic activists concerned for the environmental impact of open-pit iron ore mining on the Guapinol and San Pedro rivers which served as the main source of water for people living in Bajo Aguán.

In 2018, 300 CMDBCP activists took part in a camp at the Montaña de Botaderos Carlos Escalares National Park to protest damaged caused in the area by silt overflow. During the protest, shootings and police raids occurred at the camp. After 87 days, a judge ordered the eviction of the activists. The Attorney General, Johel Zelaya, later confirmed that he would take legal action against Lenir Pérez and Ana Facussé, the owners of EMCO, for damages caused to the park, a decision which was praised by López.

=== Harassment ===
In May 2019, Inversiones Los Pinares bought a criminal case against 32 people linked to the 2018 protest, with López being named as the protest's ringleader despite him stating that he had not been present at the camp. López was detained for 12 days and was subsequently the victim of a smear campaign. In August 2019, López and the other named activists attended a court hearing in Tegucigalpa to appeal their arrest orders; while a judge dismissed the charge of criminal association, the activists were kept in "preventative pre-trial detention" for almost two years, before the Supreme Court of Honduras ruled in February 2022 that they should never have been put on trial and ordered their immediate release. During their detention, Amnesty International declared them as prisoners of conscience due to them being imprisoned for peacefully protesting, while the United Nations found their detention to be arbitrary. The criminal case was reopened days after López's killing.

In 2023, three CMDBCP activists were murdered; Aly Magdaleno Domínguez Ramos and Jairo Bonilla Ayala were shot dead on 7 January, and Domínguez's brother Oquelí was killed on 15 June. As of 2025, no one had been charged in relation to any of their deaths. Following the murders, Inversiones Los Pinares' mining projects in the area were suspended for two years by the Honduran government.

The Inter-American Commission on Human Rights subsequently granted López, alongside other CMDBCP activists and members of the law firm Justicia para los Pueblos, precautionary protective measures, requiring Honduran authorities to put in place security features through its National Protection System. Days prior to his murder, López had criticised the measures put in place by the Honduran authorities as "ineffective", and the Honduran National Commissioner for Human Rights had issued an early warning to the government for failing to implement protective measures as ordered by the commission.

In June 2024, López reported that men on motorcycles had begun circling his home, and that he had received threats from a gang member, a local businessman, and a mining company representative. In September 2024, he had called for the resignation of the mayor of Tocoa, Adán Fúnez, after a 2013 video clip of him discussing bribes with drug traffickers was released.

== Assassination and aftermath ==
On 14 September 2024, López was shot dead in his car outside the San Isidro Labrador church in Tocoa, where he had been attending mass. It was reported that there had been several assailants, who subsequently fled the scene.

On 6 October 2024, the Public Prosecutor's Office announced that three men had been arrested in relation to López's death. On 9 October, the men were formally charged with his murder and held in pre-trial detention pending a trial. The preliminary hearing for the men was held on 3 June in San Pedro Sula.

In February 2025, local media reported that video footage had emerged of Adán Fúnez, the mayor of Tocoa, speaking to the suspected gunmen; prosecutors refused to comment on the reports, stating they were still processing digital evidence.

=== Response ===
Amnesty International compared López's death to the assassination of Berta Cáceres, a Honduran environmental activist who had been shot dead in her home in 2016; it called for his killers to be brought to justice in fair trials. The Civil Council of Popular and Indigenous Organisations of Honduras, which had been founded by Cáceres, criticised the failure of Honduran authorities to protect López, and attributed his death to Los Pinares, Ecotek, and corrupt local officials. The North American Congress on Latin America similarly noted that Honduran authorities had failed to offer adequate protection to Cáceres and to López.

Front Line Defenders condemned López's killing and expressed its "deep concern" at continued violence against environmental activists in Honduras.

Pope Francis publicly mourned López's death, recognising his role as a champion for the environment within the Catholic church. Other Catholic organisations, including the Latin American Bishops' Conference, Caritas Internationalis and the Jesuit European Social Centre condemned the violence used against López. Jenry Ruiz, the Bishop of Trujillo, praised López for following Pope Francis' environmental teachings, including Laudato si', and for treating his detractors with "tenderness and truth". Carlos Orellana, the priest of San Isidro Labrador church where López was assassinated, alleged that Adán Fúnez was responsible for the killing.

The President of Honduras, Xiomara Castro, pledged to use the "full force of the law" to seek justice for López; the Attorney General, Johel Zelaya, condemned López's assassination and promised that his death would not go "unpunished".

The Guapinol River Defenders Justice Observatory demanded accountability for those responsible, as well as systemic reforms to protect environmental defenders.

== See also ==
- Carlos Escaleras: Honduran environmental activist assassinated in 1997.
- Berta Cáceres: Honduran environmental activist assassinated in 2016.
