= Tocoa =

Tocoa may refer to:

- Tocoa, Colón, Honduras
- Río Tocoa, in Honduras
- Toccoa, Georgia, in the United States.
