= Miss Grand Honduras =

National beauty contest in Honduras

- Formation: 10 July 2022; 4 years ago
- Founder: Amelia Vega
- Type: Beauty pageant
- Headquarters: Tegucigalpa
- Location: Honduras
- Members: Miss Grand International
- Official language: Spanish
- National Director: Carlos Marroquin
- Parent organization: Señorita Honduras (2013, 2015, 2018); AV Productions (2021 – 2024)
- Website: MissGrandHonduras.org

Miss Grand Honduras is a national beauty pageant in Honduras, founded in 2022 by a chairperson of AV Productions, Amelia Vega. The winner represents the country at its parent contest Miss Grand International. Previously in 2013 to 2015, the license belonged to the Miss Honduras organization.

Honduras participated in the Miss Grand International pageant six times in 2013, 2015, 2021, 2022, 2023, 2024, and 2026; but only qualified for the semi-final round thrice in 2022, 2023, and 2026. The reigning Miss Grand Honduras is Emely Alemán of Olancho Department who was crowned on 11 January 2026, she will represent Honduras in Miss Grand International 2022.

== Background ==
=== History ===
Honduras participated at Miss Grand International for the first time in 2013, represented by former Miss Honduras 2013 Nelly Reyes, who was appointed by the Miss Honduras organization which franchised the license for 2013 and 2015. However, no Honduran licensee for Miss Grand International from 2016 to 2020, but after such the hiatus, former Miss International Queen Honduras, Amelia Vega, acquired the license in 2021 and subsequently appointed Celia Monterrosa, Miss Honduras 2017, to participate in that year's edition in Thailand. Moreover, under her directorship, an inaugural edition of Miss Grand Honduras also happen in the following year, aiming to determine country representatives for the Miss Grand International 2022 and 2023. The contest featured eighteen finalists represented eighteen country departments, of which Saira Cacho of Colón was elected the main winner, while Britthany Marroquin of Copán was named the 2023 titleholder.

After the finish of the Miss Grand International 2024 pageant, the partnership between Amelia Vega and the MGI PCL was discontinued. The license was then obtained by Carlos Thomas Marroquin in 2026.

=== Selection of contestants ===
In its first two editions, the national finalists were directly chosen by the central licensee through an online application then the qualified candidates were later assigned to represent one of the 18 country's administrative departments.

== Editions ==
=== Date and Venue ===
The following table lists the details of each edition of the Miss Grand Honduras pageant since its inception in 2022.

Edition	Date	Final venue	Entrants	Ref.
1st (Note: In the same event, the 2023 titleholder was also determined.)	10 July 2022	La Galería, Tegucigalpa	18	
2nd	16 September 2023	Centro de Convenciones Honduras Maya, Tegucigalpa	16	
3rd	2027			

=== Competition result ===
Edition	Winner	Runners-up				Ref.
Edition	Winner	First	Second	Third	Fourth	Ref.
1st	Saira Cacho (Colón)	Isabel Durón (Olancho)	Nasifa Gabie (Cortés)	Not awarded		
1st	Britthany Marroquin (Copán)	Isabel Durón (Olancho)	Nasifa Gabie (Cortés)	Not awarded		
2nd	Cecilia García (Francisco Morazán)	Abigail Rovelo (Intibucá)	Alejandra Espino (Copán)	Layisha Serrano (Atlántida)	Nathaly Rivera (Santa Bárbara)	

== International competition ==
The following is a list of Hondurans representatives at the Miss Grand International contest.

Color keys

- : Declared as the winner
- : Ended as a runner-up (Top 5)
- : Ended as a finalist (Top 10)
- : Ended as a semifinalist (Top 20/21)
- : Ended as special awards winner

Year	Miss Grand Honduras	National title	Placement	Special Awards	National Director
2027					Carlos Thomas; Marroquin
2026	Emely Alemán	4th runner-up Miss Grand United States 2025	Top 25		Carlos Thomas; Marroquin
Did not compete in 2025
2024	Yariela García	Top 10 Miss Grand Honduras 2022	Unplaced	Best National Costume	Amelia Vega
2024	Cecilia García	Miss Grand Honduras 2024	Resigned		Amelia Vega
2023	Britthany Marroquin	Miss Grand Honduras 2023 (Note: Main title in Miss Grand Honduras 2022 pageant)	Top 20		Amelia Vega
2022	Saira Cacho	Miss Grand Honduras 2022	Top 20		Amelia Vega
2021	Celia Monterrosa	Miss Honduras World 2017	Unplaced		Amelia Vega
Did not compete between 2019 - 2020
2018	María Fernanda Amador	Finalist Miss Honduras World 2018	Did not compete		Eduardo Zablah
Did not compete between 2016 - 2017
2015	Nadia Morales	Appointed	Unplaced		Eduardo Zablah
Did not compete in 2014
2013	Nelly Reyes	2nd runner-up Miss Honduras 2013	Unplaced		Eduardo Zablah

== Winner gallery ==
Miss Grand Honduras 2026
Emely Aleman

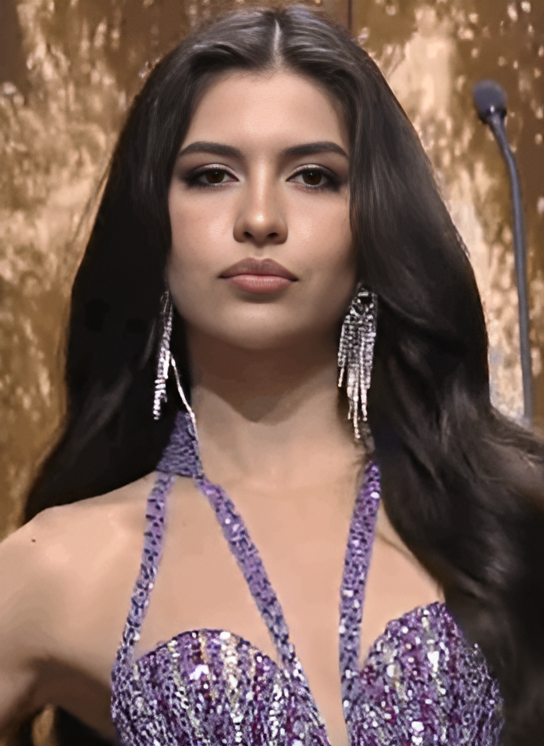
Miss Grand Honduras 2024
Yariela García

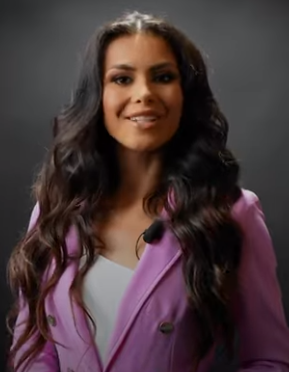
Miss Grand Honduras 2023
Britthany Marroquin

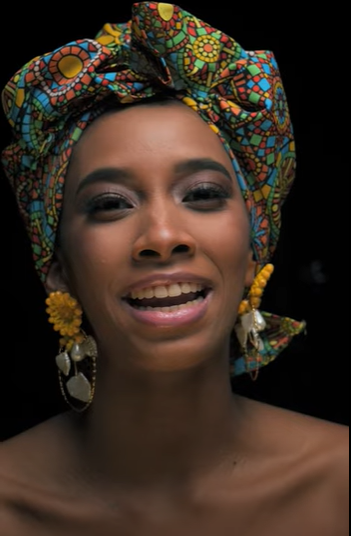
Miss Grand Honduras 2022
Saira Cacho

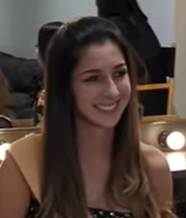
Miss Grand Honduras 2021
Celia Monterrosa
