= Morazán, Yoro =

Morazán
- Municipality
- Location in Honduras
- Coordinates: 15°19′N 87°36′W
- Country: Honduras
- Department: Yoro
- Villages: 25

Area
  - Municipality: 509 km^{2} (197 sq mi)

Population (2023 projection)
  - Municipality: 50,930
  - Density: 100/km^{2} (259/sq mi)
  - Urban: 33,658
- Time zone: UTC-6 (Central America)
- Climate: Aw

Morazán (Spanish pronunciation: [moɾaˈsan]) is a town, with a population of 22,240 (2023 calculation), and a municipality in the Honduran department of Yoro. This political division of 50,930 people is in the north, located between the city of Yoro and the municipality of El Negrito, north of the Pico Pijol National Park.

The town scores low on development indices within Honduras. Like many towns of the Spanish Empire Morazan was laid out in a grid, with a central plaza.

== History ==
It is known that in ancient times, people in the current header lived in a place that is far from it three kilometers away and called Toledo, soon the inhabitants of this moved to where the population is and gave it the name Cataguana and contained in the 1801 population count, as part of the Prefectures of Yoro and in the 1887 census and appears as municipio.

== Municipality ==
The municipality is bordered on the north by the town of Tela, on the south by the city of Victoria, east to the town of Yoro and west by the municipality of El Negrito.

The municipality has the following 25 villages: Morazán, Agua Blanca, Buena Vista, Candelaria, Charity, Cuyamapa, Chililenga, El Porvenir Reef, Teabag, La Cruz, La Estancia, Lempira, Los Prietos or San Martin, Mango Seco, Mojimán, Nombre de Dios, New Hope, New Florida, Ocote Paulino, Paya, Portillo Gonzalez Rompidos Guayma or lilies, or Palmar San Antonio, San Juan and San Rafael Camalote of Aguacatales. and to forge and the largest lagoon

== Demographics ==
At the time of the 2013 Honduras census, Morazán municipality had a population of 40,402. Of these, 93.77% were Mestizo, 3.70% Indigenous (3.36% Tolupan), 2.01% White, 0.26% Black or Afro-Honduran and 0.26% others.

== Education ==
Instituto Polivalente Francisco Morazán.

== Churches ==
- Católico Francisco Javier
- Iglesia Catolica Virgen de los Desamparados
- Iglesia Evangelica
- Iglesia del Nazareno
