= C.D.Olimpia Cortes =

Honduran football club

C.D. Olimpia Cortes
- Full name: Club Deportivo Olimpia Cortes
- Nickname(s): Leones, Cortes
- Ground: Estadio Francisco M. Durón; Tocoa, Honduras
- Capacity: 3,000
- League: Liga Mayor de Futbol de Honduras
- Website: http://clubolimpia.com/historia/
Home colours	Away colours

Club Deportivo Olimpia Cortes is a Honduran soccer club based on Tocoa, Honduras.

The club currently plays in Liga Mayor de Futbol de Honduras.

== See also ==
- Season 09/10 - RSSSF
