= Parrillas One =

Honduran football club

- Full name: Club Deportivo Parrillas One
- Nickname(s): Los Parrilleros
- Founded: 14 February 1993; 32 years ago
- Ground: Estadio Luis Girón; La Lima, Honduras
- Capacity: 5,000
- President: Luis Girón
- Manager: Rommel Salgado
- League: Liga Nacional
Home colours	Away colours	Third colours

Club Deportivo Parrillas One (pronounced pah-RI-yas OH-neh) is a Honduran football team based in San Pedro Sula, Cortés.

For the 2012–13 season they played at Estadio Alfredo León Gómez in Tela. They were first promoted to Liga Nacional de Futbol de Honduras in the 2013 where they confirmed they will remain in Tela. The sponsor is Parrillas y Repuestos One, an automobile body shop.

== History ==
The team is named for the sponsor, Parrillas y Repuestos One, an automobile body shop. Parrillas means "[car] grilles" in Spanish and One (pronounced "Oh-neh") is the company owner and club chairman's childhood nickname.

The club was founded in 1993 as a leisure team for workers of the car paint shop, Parrillas One who played amateur pick-up games on Saturdays. The club later joined Liga Comercial Emin Abufelle, an amateur league for company football teams.

=== Professional career ===
In 2000, Parrillas One bought Palestino's spot in Segunda Division (Second Division). A year later the team reached their first Second Division final against Honduras Salzburg where they were defeated and lost a chance to win promotion to First Division. They reached a final again in 2010–11 Apertura, where they defeated Yoro on 3–2 aggregated score. Since 2004, promotion to Liga Nacional has been contested by apertura and clausura winners. Parrillas, as apertura champions, faced Atlético Choloma to decide promotion and once again lost a chance to play in the Honduran top-flight football. The team contested promotion again as 2011–12 Clausura champions against Real Sociedad. For the third time in their history Parrillas lost a chance for promotion.

For three years straight Parrillas reached a promotion final as 2012–13 Clausura champions. They faced Juticalpa in a new promotion system of one leg, in a neutral stadium. Comayagua was chosen to host the promotion final, where the match ended 1–1 in regular time and Parrillas became the new Liga Nacional team for 2013–14 winning 5–4 in penalties.

They made their debut at Honduras' top level on 10 August 2013 against Vida and won 2–1. They qualified to the play-offs in their first tournament by finishing in 6th place. They qualified over Victoria, finishing with the same points and goal difference but scoring 1 more goal.

The club was scheduled to open their own new stadium, Estadio Parrillas One, in La Lima by early 2019.

== Honours ==
- Segunda División / Liga de Ascenso

Winners (3): 2010–11 A, 2011–12 C, 2012–13 C
Runners-up (2): 2001–02, 2015–16 C

== Current squad ==
Note: Flags indicate national team as defined under FIFA eligibility rules; some limited exceptions apply. Players may hold more than one non-FIFA nationality.

No.	Pos.	Nation	Player
-	GK	(Colombia) COL	Yarleison Mosquera
-	GK	(Honduras) HON	Rodimiro Tejada
-	GK	(Honduras) HON	Javier Delgado
-	DF	(Honduras) HON	Roberto Carlos Díaz
-	DF	(Colombia) COL	Andrés Ortiz
-	DF	(Honduras) HON	Dylan Andrade
-	DF	(Colombia) COL	Yeison Mosquera
-	DF	(Honduras) HON	Cristian Moreira
-	DF	(Honduras) HON	Elder Ramos
-	DF	(Honduras) HON	Ángel Oseguera
-	DF	(Colombia) COL	Cesar Vente
-	MF	(Honduras) HON	Luis Argeñal

No.	Pos.	Nation	Player
-	MF	(Honduras) HON	Jonathan Tejada
-	MF	(Honduras) HON	Francisco López
-	MF	(Honduras) HON	Hector Ulloa
-	MF	(Honduras) HON	Jorge Cardona
-	FW	(Colombia) COL	Yerson Gutiérrez
-	FW	(Honduras) HON	Henry Romero
-	FW	(Honduras) HON	Jerrick Díaz
-	FW	(Honduras) HON	Pedro Hernández
-	FW	(Honduras) HON	Denilson Castillo
-	FW	(Honduras) HON	Georgie Welcome
-	FW	(Honduras) HON	Rubén Licona
-	FW	(Colombia) COL	Editson Mina

== List of coaches ==
- (Honduras) Carlos Ramón Tábora (2010)
- (Honduras) Allan Bennett (2011)
- (Honduras) Emilio Umanzor (2011-2012)
- (Honduras) Domingo Ramos (2012-2013)
- (Honduras) Luis Enrique Cálix (2013)
- (Honduras) Carlos Ramón Tábora (2014)
- (Honduras) Douglas Munguía (2014)
- (Uruguay) Vicente Daniel Viera Bertolino (2016)
- (Honduras) Mauro Reyes (2017)
- (Honduras) Rafael Fernando Molina Ruiz (2018)
- (Honduras) Carlos Obando Cáceres (2019)
- (Honduras) José Alvarado (2019-2020)
- (Honduras) Miguel Mariano (2020-2022)
- (Honduras) Fernando Molina (2022-2023)
- (Honduras) Carlos Martínez (2023)
- (Argentina) Rodolfo Sabarís (2023–)
- (Honduras) Ninrod Medina (2024)
- (Honduras) Jorge Lozano (2024–)
