= Barros F.C. =

Honduran football club

- Full name: Barros Football Club
- Founded: 23 August 1993; 31 years ago
- Ground: Estadio Municipal de Cofradía
- Capacity: 2,000
- Chairman: José Villeda; Alberto Lara; Pedro Ayala
- League: Liga Mayor
Home colours

Barros F.C. is a Honduran football club, based in Cofradía, Honduras that plays in the Honduran Liga Mayor, the third-highest division overall in Honduran football. Founded in 1993, they were invited to play at the 2015 Honduran Cup where they reached the second round.
