= C.D. Real Sociedad =

Association football club in Honduras

Real Sociedad
- Full name: Club Deportivo Real Sociedad
- Nicknames: El Gigante del Aguán (The Giant of Aguán); La Realeza (The Royalty); Los Aceiteros (The Palm Oilers)
- Founded: 1986; 40 years ago
- Ground: Estadio Francisco Martínez Durón; Tocoa, Colón
- Capacity: 6,000
- Owner: Ricardo Elencof
- Manager: Jhon Jairo López
- League: Liga Nacional
Home colours	Away colours	Third colours

Club Deportivo Real Sociedad, commonly known as Real Sociedad (pronounced [ˈkluβ ðepoɾˈtiβo reˈal sosjeˈðað]), is a Honduran professional football club based on Tocoa, Colón.

== History ==
Real Sociedad reached the Liga Nacional de Ascenso (the Honduran second flight) in 1988, and played there until the 2011–2012 season. Their success in that season saw them earn promotion to the top flight. In their first season, the 2012 Apertura (first season), they finished in last place and were in danger of instant relegation. The team's board of directors began replenishing the team with a host of signings. First came Julio César de León, an attacking midfielder and free kick specialist then playing in Italy. Next came midfielder Elkin González, forward Juan Cárcamo, and keeper Sandro Carcamo. All these players were on the older side, but their experience steeled the team. They then secured young striker Rony Martínez on loan and played him alongside quick center forward Diego Reyes. Suddenly, Real Sociedad was a team to be reckoned with.

The clausura tournament saw the Tocoeños surge to the opposite end of the table. Not only were they well clear of relegation, they finished second and earned an automatic berth in the Clausura semi-finals. There, they beat 5–2 on aggregate and earned the right to face Olimpia in the championship finals. No Honduran club has been quite as successful as Olimpia, but Real Sociedad took them to the limit, winning the first leg of the tie 1–0. It wasn't enough, as Olimpia ultimately prevailed 2–1, but Real Sociedad had secured themselves in the top flight.

The suddenly well-stocked team continued to compete, finishing top of the table in the 2013 Apertura regular season. They reached the finals again, only to lose on penalties to Real España. They also qualified for the 2014 Clausura playoffs, losing in the semi-finals. Overall, Real Sociedad's 17 wins in 36 matches made them the most successful team in the 2013–2014 season (although they did not win any championships.

Over the next several years, Sociedad was a regular playoff participant and reached the finals in both the 2014 Apertura and 2016 Clausura. However, the 2017–2018 season saw their form collapse. They finished 7th in the Apertura and dead last in the Clausura. A late season surge by Honduras Progreso doomed them to relegation, ending their first stint in the top flight.

== Achievements ==
Real Sociedad qualified to their first final just after one year of being promoted into the first division. They defeated Victoria 5–2 aggregate and later faced Olimpia, giving Colón its first final in history.

- Liga Nacional

Runners-up (4): 2012–13 C, 2013–14 A, 2014–15 A, 2015–16 C

- Segunda División / Liga de Ascenso

Winners (2): 2011–12 A, 2018–19 A
Runners-up (3): 1997–98, 2010–11 C, 2011–12 C

== Domestic history ==
Season	League										Post Season			Honduran Cup	Top goalscorer		Manager
Season	Div.	Stg.	Pos.	Pl.	W	D	L	GS	GA	P	Pos.	GS	GA	Honduran Cup	Name	League	Manager
2012–13	1st	Apertura	10th	18	4	5	9	13	21	17	N/A			-	Rony Martínez	12	(Honduras) Raúl Martínez Sambulá (Colombia) Jairo Ríos
2012–13	1st	Clausura	2nd	18	8	6	4	23	13	30	Runner-up	6	4	-	Rony Martínez	12	(Honduras) Raúl Martínez Sambulá (Colombia) Jairo Ríos
2013–14	1st	Apertura	1st	18	8	6	4	29	21	30	Runner-up	6	6	-	Rony Martínez	24	(Honduras) Héctor Castellón (Honduras) Mauro Reyes
2013–14	1st	Clausura	2nd	18	9	4	5	32	21	31	Semi-final	0	1	-	Rony Martínez	24	(Honduras) Héctor Castellón (Honduras) Mauro Reyes
2014–15	1st	Apertura	5th	18	7	6	5	25	18	27	Runner-up	7	7	Round of 16	Osman Melgares	7	(Honduras) Mauro Reyes (Colombia) Horacio Londoño
2014–15	1st	Clausura	5th	18	4	10	4	14	16	22	Play-offs	0	2	Round of 16	Osman Melgares	7	(Honduras) Mauro Reyes (Colombia) Horacio Londoño

== Squad (2025) ==
Note: Flags indicate national team as defined under FIFA eligibility rules; some limited exceptions apply. Players may hold more than one non-FIFA nationality.

No.	Pos.	Nation	Player
1	GK	VEN	Jorge Roa
2	DF	HON	Deyron Martínez
3	DF	HON	Adrián Ramírez
4	DF	HON	Noé Enamorado
5	DF	COL	Bismark Moreno
6	DF	HON	Nibiri Martinez
7	FW	HON	Diego Reyes
9	FW	HON	Geovany Martínez
10	FW	HON	Yunny Dolmo
11	MF	HON	Rony Martínez (captain)
12	MF	HON	Mayron Flores
13	DF	COL	Luis Ortiz
14	MF	HON	Miguel Carrasco
15	MF	HON	José Domínguez
16	DF	TRI	Alvin Jones

No.	Pos.	Nation	Player
17	FW	HON	Axell Fuentes
18	DF	HON	Darwin Quioto
19	FW	PAN	Saed Díaz
20	DF	HON	Pedro Gotay
21	FW	HON	Edwin Agurcia
22	DF	HON	Óscar Gónzalez
23	MF	HON	Edder Delgado
25	DF	HON	Axel Gómez
26	DF	HON	Robel Bernárdez
27	GK	HON	Francisco Reyes
28	DF	HON	César Oseguera
30	FW	HON	Brandon Turner
32	MF	HON	Dester Monico
34	DF	HON	Jeffrey Ramos

== List of coaches ==
- (Honduras) Raúl Martínez Sambulá (2012 – Nov 12)
- (Colombia) Jairo Ríos (Jan 2013 – May 13)
- (Honduras) Héctor Castellón (June 2013–1?)
- (Honduras) Mauro Reyes (201?–Sept 14)
- (Colombia) Horacio Londoño (2014–2015)
- (Honduras) Mauro Reyes (2015–2016)
- (Honduras) Mauro Reyes (2015–2016)
- (Costa Rica) Marvin Solano (2016)
- (Honduras) Douglas Munguía (2016)
- (Honduras) Carlos Martínez (2016–2017)
- (Honduras) Héctor "Figura" Medina (2017)
- (Honduras) Carlos Martínez (2017)
- (Honduras) Douglas Munguía (2017–2018)
- (Honduras) Santiago Fúnez (2018)
- (Honduras) David Fúnez (2018)
- (Honduras) José Maley (2018)
- (Colombia) Horacio Londoño (2019)
- (Honduras) Carlos Martínez (2019)
- (Honduras) Mauro Reyes (2019)
- (Honduras) Carlos Tábora (2019–2020)
- (Honduras) Mauro Reyes (2020)
- (Honduras) Carlos Martínez (2020)
- (Spain) Adrián García Padilla (2020)
- (Honduras) Carlos Tábora (2020–2022)
- (Colombia) Orlando Restrepo (2022)
- (Honduras) David Fúnez (2022)
- (Argentina) Luis Scatolaro (2022)
- (Honduras) Mauro Reyes (2022–2023)
- (Honduras) Ramón Maradiaga (2023)
- (Colombia) Jhon Jairo López (2023 - Present)
