= Bonito Oriental =

- Municipality
- Location in Honduras
- Coordinates: 15°44′N 85°44′W
- Country: Honduras
- Department: Colón

Area
  - Municipality: 509 km^{2} (197 sq mi)

Population (2023 projection)
  - Municipality: 30,675
  - Density: 60.3/km^{2} (156/sq mi)
  - Urban: 19,349
- Climate: Aw

Bonito Oriental is a town, with a population of 10,790 (2023 calculation), and a municipality in the Honduran department of Colón.

The town of Bonito Oriental is the primary location of the novel The Mosquito Coast by Paul Theroux. While Theroux's book describes the town as being very remote and difficult to get to, it was actually located about one mile from a main paved highway at the time he wrote the book.
