= Carlos Tábora =

Honduran footballer and coach (born 1965)

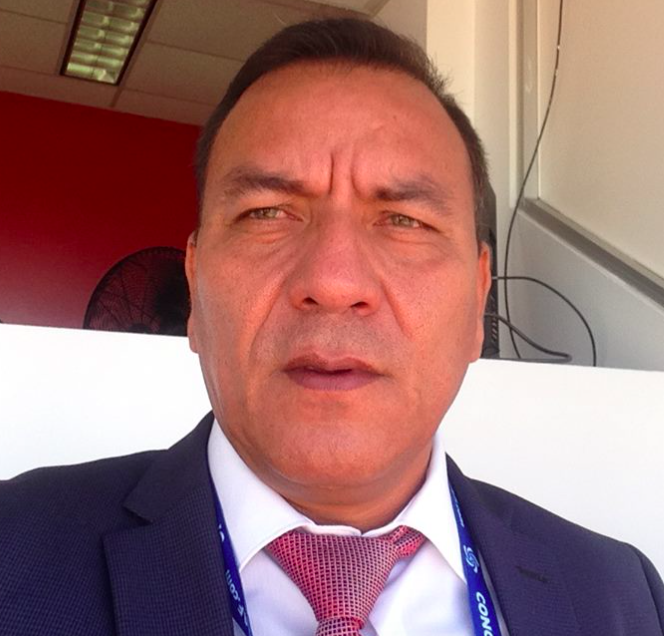

Personal information
- Full name: Carlos Ramón Tábora Hernández
- Date of birth: 30 January 1965 (age 61)
- Place of birth: Sabá, Honduras
- Height: 1.69 m (5 ft 7 in)

Managerial career
- Years: Team
- 2016–2019: Honduras U-20
- 2018: Honduras

Carlos Ramón Tábora Hernández (born 30 January 1965) is a Honduran football coach and former player. He coaches the Honduras national under-20 team.

== Coaching ==
=== Sula ===
On February 16, 2012, he was appointed and signed for Sula de La Lima, replacing Allan Bennett. He debuted on February 19 against West Olympia in the city of La Entrada. In his only managed tournament his team avoided relegation to the third division.

=== Honduras national under-21 football team ===
In March 2013, he led Honduras at the 2013 Central AKmerican Sports Games, where the Honduras U-21 national team became champion.

=== Honduras national under-15 football team ===
In August of that same year, he coached the Honduras Under-15 National Team in the 2013 CONCACAF Under-15 Championship. In that championship, his team (the same outcome of the same underage team of Honduras) also won the title of champion.

=== Parrillas One (2nd term) ===
On December 8, 2013, his return to the technical management of Parrillas One was announced, but this time in the top division of the league. Their first game was a 1–1 draw against Marathon at the Metropolitan Olympic Stadium in San Pedro Sula. After the tournament, his team was in seventh place in the standings with 20 points and failed to qualify to the league after falling to Motagua.

=== Platense (2nd term) ===
On February 2, 2015, he signed a one-year contract with Platense. He achieved an excellent participation in the cup tournament, losing the final against Olimpia. Unfortunately, their runners made a terrible campaign in the league, finishing in the tenth position.

=== Honduras national under-20 football team ===
Tábora coached the U-20 Honduras national team in the 2017 FIFA U-20 World Cup in South Korea. In that World Cup, his team finished in third place in Group E.

=== Honduras national team ===
On 26 February 2018, he was appointed as coach for the Honduras national football team.
