= Calvario F.C. =

Honduran football club

- Full name: Calvario Football Club
- Founded: 20 August 2012; 12 years ago
- Ground: Estadio Jorge Alberto Arias
- Capacity: 2,000
- League: Liga Mayor

Calvario F.C. is a Honduran football club, based in Langue, Honduras that plays in the Honduran Liga Mayor, the third-highest division overall in Honduran football. Founded as Calvario F.C. in 2012, they were invited to play at the 2015 Honduran Cup as Atlético Calvario.

Calvario F.C. has won the local Langue League twice.
