= Yorito =

- Municipality
- Location in Honduras
- Coordinates: 15°04′N 87°17′W
- Country: Honduras
- Department: Yoro
- Villages: 9

Area
  - Total: 209.14 km^{2} (80.75 sq mi)

Population (2015)
  - Total: 19,824
  - Density: 94.788/km^{2} (245.50/sq mi)
- Time zone: UTC-6 (Central America)
- Climate: Aw

Yorito is a municipality in the department of Yoro, Honduras.

== Demographics ==
At the time of the 2013 Honduras census, Yorito municipality had a population of 18,823. Of these, 83.08% were Mestizo, 14.54% Indigenous (13.43% Tolupan), 2.04% White, 0.32% Black or Afro-Honduran and 0.01% others.
