= Estadio Parrillas One =

Football stadium in La Lima, Honduras

Estadio Luis Girón
- Interactive map of Estadio Luis Girón
- Location: La Lima, Honduras
- Coordinates: 15°25′30″N 87°55′39″W
- Owner: Parrillas One
- Capacity: 7,500
- Surface: Grass

Construction
- Opened: February 2019

Tenant
- Parrillas One (2019–)

The Luis Girón is a 7,500-seat football stadium in La Lima, Honduras, and home of the Parrillas One. The work on this venue began in February 2018 and it was opened in October 2022.
