= Atlético Nacional (Honduras) =

Honduran football club

- Full name: Atlético Nacional
- Ground: Estadio José Adrián Cruz, Villanueva, Honduras
- League: Liga Nacional de Ascenso de Honduras

Atlético Nacional is a Honduran football club based in Villanueva, Honduras.

== History ==
They took over the Ingenio Villanueva franchise to play in the Honduran second division from the 2013 Clausura. They were named Atlético Nacional after being bought by a Colombian company. Ingenio Villanueva were promoted to the second tier themselves in summer 2012, after Pablo Zapata scored a hattrick to beat Merendón 3–1 in the second leg of the Liga Mayor championship final.
