= Carlos Escaleras =

Honduran politician and environmental activist

- Born: 10 August 1958; Tocoa, Colón, Honduras
- Died: 17 October 1997 (aged 39); Tocoa, Colón, Honduras
- Occupations: Politician and activist
- Spouse: Martha Alvarenga

Carlos Escaleras Mejía (10 August 1958 – 17 October 1997) was a Honduran politician and environmental activist.

== Biography ==
Escaleras was son of José Andrés Escaleras and Ofelia Mejía, during the mid-1990s he began to coordinate actions against the famous businessman Miguel Facussé Barjum which sought to install a palm oil extraction plant near Guapinol river, which would be an enormous burden for at least five communities plus some Tocoa neighborhoods.

Also in 1997 led the protests against Colonel Aldana, commander of Infantry Battalion XV, who, by personal interests, prevented access to water to the inhabitants of Chapagua, Agua Amarilla, Honduras Aguan and other populations. In August of that year was threatened by Colonel Aldana. By that time Escaleras was nominated to be candidate for Mayor of Tocoa representing the Democratic Unification Party for the elections of that year.

== Murder ==
In the afternoon of October 18, 1997 Escaleras was shot two times while attending his car wash business in downtown Tocoa.

== Aftermath ==
Between the primary suspects in the murder were Orlando Martínez, Lucas García Alfaro and Oscar Sosa. Of them only Lucas García Alfaro was sentenced to 17 years in prison on 16 October 2002. Subsequently, the Criminal Investigation General Department (DGIC) got an affidavit from García Alfaro's notary public, in which he noted as masterminds to Salomón Martinez, Juan Ramón Salgado, Aldo Augusto Aldana and Miguel Facussé.

But for Judge Rogelio Clara, aware of the case, this statement has no merit in the case. Nevertheless, Miguel Facussé and a business executive, Irene Castro, were charged and testified investigation, which denied involvement in the events. On October 14, 2003, the Civil Court of Tocoa issued them.

== See also ==
- Berta Cáceres: Honduran environmental activist assassinated in 2016
- Juan López: Honduran environmental activist assassinated in 2024
