= Cobán Athletic =

Honduran football club

- Full name: Cobán Athletic
- Ground: Estadio Manuel Castillo Girón, Jesús de Otoro
- League: Liga Nacional de Ascenso de Honduras

Cobán Athletic is a Honduran football club based in Jesús de Otoro, Honduras.

== History ==
They were promoted to the Honduran second division in summer 2013.
