= Sonaguera F.C. =

Honduran football club

Sonaguera FC
- Full name: Sonaguera Football Club
- Ground: Estádio Municipal de Sonaguera; Sonaguera, Department of Colón, Honduras
- Capacity: 3,000
- League: Liga Mayor

Sonaguera Football Club is a Honduran soccer club based in Sonaguera, Department of Colón, Honduras.

== History ==
The club played in the Honduran second division but were relegated in summer 2013 after being beaten by Olimpia Occidental in a relegation play-off.

== See also ==
- Season 09/10
