= Jocón =

Jocón, Honduras
- Municipality
- Location in Honduras
- Coordinates: 15°17′N 86°58′W
- Country: Honduras
- Department: Yoro
- Villages: 10

Area
  - Total: 346.8 km^{2} (133.9 sq mi)

Population (2015)
  - Total: 9,659
  - Density: 27.85/km^{2} (72.14/sq mi)
- Time zone: UTC-6 (Central America)
- Climate: Aw

Jocón is a municipality in the department of Yoro, Honduras.

== Demographics ==
At the time of the 2013 Honduras census, Jocón municipality had a population of 9,591. Of these, 98.78% were Mestizo, 0.76% Black or Afro-Honduran, 0.30% White, 0.15% Indigenous and 0.01% others.
