= Ariel Alvarado =

Panamanian athletic administrator

Ariel Alberto Alvarado Carrasco (born 1959 in Panama City) is a Panamanian lawyer and athletic administrator.

== Career ==
Alvarado was president of the Panamanian Football Federation (FEPAFUT) from 2000 until 2011.

From 2007 to 2015, he was a member of the FIFA Ethics Committee. Between 2007 and 2012 Alvarado was a member of the executive committee of the Confederation of North, Central American and Caribbean Football Associations (CONCACAF).

== FIFA's fraud case ==
In 2015, after an investigation, 16 defendants were identified for wire fraud, money laundering and extortion, including Alvarado. The U.S. Department of Justice charged him with conspiracy to commit racketeering, wire fraud and money laundering. The offenses charged in the indictment occurred while Alvarado was an official of FEPAFUT and FIFA between 2009 and 2011. FIFA banned him for life and fined him 500,000 Swiss francs.
