= Mario Abadía =

Colombian footballer (born 1986)

Personal information
- Full name: Mario Alberto Abadía López
- Date of birth: 3 April 1986 (age 40)
- Place of birth: Cali, Colombia
- Height: 1.86 m (6 ft 1 in)
- Position: Forward

Team information
- Current team: Platense
- Number: 15

Senior career*
Years	Team	Apps	(Gls)
2004	Tauro		
2005	Real Popayán F. C.		
2006	Centauros Villavicencio		
2007	Tauro		
2007	América de Cali		
2008	Patriotas		
2009–2010	Cerrito	11	(0)
2010–2011	Sud América		
2011	América de Cali	3	(0)
2012	FAS	5	(0)
2013	Juventud Independiente	11	(2)
2014–present	Platense	21	(9)
- * Club domestic league appearances and goals as of 3 March 2015

Mario Alberto Abadía López (born 3 April 1986) is a Colombian footballer who plays as forward for Platense F.C. in the Honduran Liga Nacional.
