= San Francisco de Yojoa =

- Municipality
- Location within Honduras
- Coordinates: 15°01′N 87°58′W
- Country: Honduras
- Department: Cortés

Area
  - Municipality: 98.7 km^{2} (38.1 sq mi)

Population (2020 projection)
  - Municipality: 24,740
  - Density: 251/km^{2} (649/sq mi)
  - Urban: 17,150
- Climate: Am

San Francisco de Yojoa (Spanish pronunciation: [saɱ fɾanˈsisko ðe ʝoˈxoa]) is a municipality in the Honduran department of Cortés. Its religious composition is majority Christian, with a lesser presence of Christian Evangelics.

The town is located in the region around Lake Yojoa.
