= Jesús de Otoro =

- Municipality
- Location within Honduras
- Coordinates: 14°29′7.37″N 87°58′45.76″W
- Country: Honduras

Government
  - Mayor of Jesús de Otoro: JUAN CARLOS TOSTA TURCIOS

Area
  - Total: 419 km^{2} (162 sq mi)
- Elevation: 1,700 m (5,600 ft)

Population (2023 projection)
  - Total: 40,565
  - Density: 96.8/km^{2} (251/sq mi)
- Time zone: UTC-6 (Central America)
- Postal code: 14201
- Municipality number: 1007

Jesús de Otoro is a town, with a population of 11,930 (2023 calculation), and a municipality in the Honduran department of Intibucá.

== Demographics ==
At the time of the 2013 Honduras census, Jesús de Otoro municipality had a population of 28,301. Of these, 84.35% were Mestizo, 12.97% Indigenous (12.68% Lenca), 2.37% White, 0.26% Black or Afro-Honduran and 0.05% others.

== Sport ==
Cobán Athletic, an association football club, is based in Jesús de Otoro.
