= San Lorenzo F.C. =

Honduran football club

San Lorenzo FC
- Full name: San Lorenzo FC
- Nickname: El Tsunami del Sur (The Southern Tsunami)
- Ground: Estadio Ángel Augusto Martínez
- League: Liga Nacional de Ascenso de Honduras
Home colours

San Lorenzo FC was a Honduran football club based on San Lorenzo, Honduras.

== History ==
In summer 2008 they were champions of the Zona Sur of the Honduran third division.

In 2013 they merged with León Libertador of Choluteca.
