= Graciano San Francisco =

Honduran football club

- Full name: Graciano San Francisco
- Ground: Estadio Marco Augusto Hernández, Gracias
- League: Liga Nacional de Ascenso de Honduras

Graciano San Francisco is a Honduran football club based in Gracias, Honduras.

== History ==
They took over the San Antonio de San Marcos de Ocotepeque franchise to play in the Honduran second division from the 2013 Clausura.
