= Estadio Francisco Martínez Durón =

Football stadium in Honduras

Francisco Martínez Durón
- Interactive map of Francisco Martínez Durón
- Full name: Estadio Francisco Martínez Durón
- Location: Tocoa, Colón, Honduras
- Coordinates: 15°39′20″N 85°59′18″W
- Capacity: 3,000
- Surface: Grass

Construction
- Opened: 1986
- Renovated: 2012
- Expanded: 2012

Tenants
- Real Sociedad; Boca Juniors de Tocoa

Estadio Francisco Martínez Durón is a football stadium in Tocoa, Honduras. It is currently used mostly for football matches and is the home stadium of C.D. Real Sociedad. The stadium holds 3,000 people. The stadium hosted its first Honduran league final May 12, 2013 when Real Sociedad faced Olimpia. Its capacity was momentarily expanded to hold 6,000 people.
