= Atlético Municipal =

Municipal
- Full name: Atlético Municipal
- Founded: August 1980
- Dissolved: 4 July 2018
- Ground: Estadio Álex Pineda Chacón; Santa Cruz de Yojoa, Honduras
- Capacity: 3,000
- Manager: Javier Padilla
- League: Liga Nacional de Ascenso
Home colours	Away colours

Atlético Municipal is a Honduran football club based in Santa Cruz de Yojoa. The club currently plays in Liga Nacional de Ascenso de Honduras.

== History ==
The club was established in August 1980. It was only the second team from the Second Division to beat Honduran giants Olimpia, 3–2 in 2011. During the 2017 Honduran Cup, the club reached the Round of 16 after eliminating the clear favorites Real C.D. España. On 4 July 2018, it was announced that the club decided to sell its franchise to Santos F.C.S., quoting financial hardship.

== Achievements ==
- Liga de Ascenso

Runners-up (2): 2011–12 A, 2012–13 A

== Former managers ==
- (Honduras) Wilmer Cruz (2011 & 2012)
