= Tocoa, Colón =

Tocoa
- Municipality
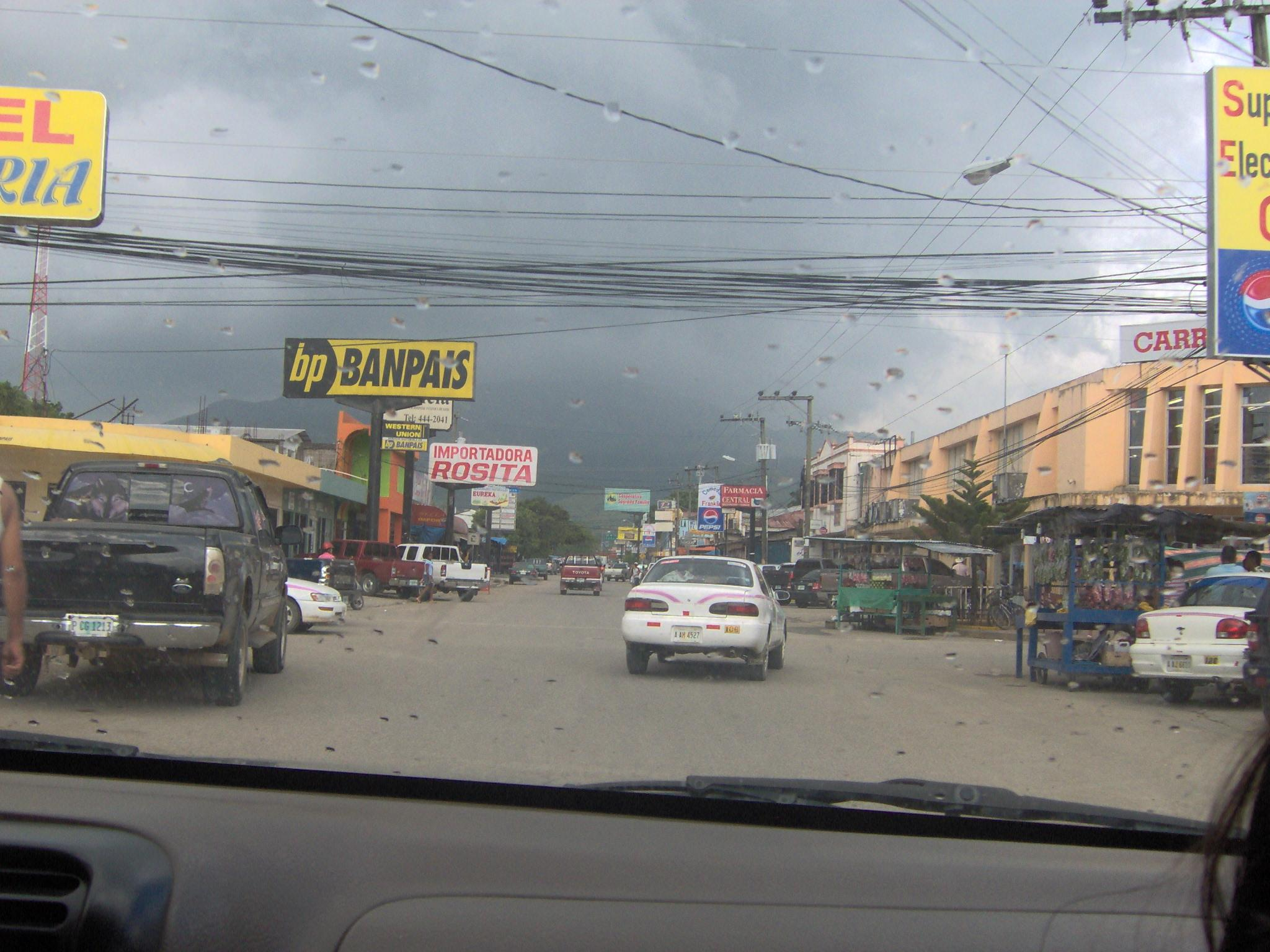
- Main street

- Location in Honduras
- Coordinates: 15°41′N 86°00′W
- Country: Honduras
- Department: Colón
- Established: 1892; 134 years ago

Government
  - Mayor: Adán Fúnez

Area
  - Municipality: 888 km^{2} (343 sq mi)
- Elevation: 38 m (125 ft)

Population (2023 projection)
  - Municipality: 111,972
  - Density: 126/km^{2} (327/sq mi)
  - Urban: 78,014

Tocoa, Colón is a city, with a population of 111,972 (2023 calculation), and a municipality in the northern Honduran department of Colón slightly inland at 38 m elevation in the valley of Aguán on the right bank of the river.

== Economy ==
The city of Tocoa produces mostly African oil palm which is used to make oil, lard and biodiesel. It also produces a lot of milk because it is a livestock area, which is partly sold to dairy companies and also consumed in the area. Corn, beans, rice, and vegetables are grown in small quantities as well as oranges and bananas. Watermelon is cultivated in its season, also in small quantities.

Being an agricultural area in the strategic location at the center of the Aguán Valley, the city is experiencing an economic takeoff for the first time. This is reflected in the new shopping centers and fast food restaurants.

== Terrain and climate ==
It is situated between Garcia and La Abiscinia hills, 61 km from Trujillo, 30 km from Sabá, 70 km from Olanchito, 100 km from La Ceiba, and 303 km from San Pedro Sula. Tocoa's territory is watered by the rivers Río Tocoa, Río Taujíca, Río San Pedro, and Río Salamá. The climate is hot and tropical with an average temperature of 29 °C; the rainy season lasts from June to January, with an average precipitation of 1000 mm annually.

== Hydrography ==
Its farmlands are irrigated by the Tocoa, Aguán, Gualaco and Salamá rivers, which are found around the city.

== History and government ==
Tocoa was founded in 1871 by settlers from inland Olancho, and declared a municipality in 1892. Juan J. Evangelista was the first mayor.

The current 2014-2018 Municipal Council is headed by Adan Funez.

Currently, the city of Tocoa, with more than 111,972 inhabitants, is one of the most populated cities in the northern part of Honduras and is the most populated city in the Department of Colón. In recent years, Tocoa has had an economic boom as a result of increased tourism and having one of the most diverse shopping markets in the country.

== Culture ==
=== Sports ===
C.D. Real Sociedad plays its games in Tocoa at the municipally owned stadium, Estadio Francisco Martínez Durón. The team gain promotion to the first division in 2012, where they brought high profile players like Julio César de León. The team has had success in their short time in the premier division reaching the final on multiple occasions. The investment in the sport has brought full stadiums and a respectable performance in the league.

== Services ==
There are several businesses, banks, companies, local and international organizations based out of Tocoa, namely: Fundacion San Alonso; CASM; Programa Mundial de Alimentos; Misiones del Agua Internacional (www.misionesdelaguainternacional.blogspot.com), a Christian engineering non-profit organization offering aid to needy people in areas such as safe water, sanitation, health and hygiene, etc., which has its Regional Latin America office in Tocoa and its World Headquarters in Charleston, SC.

== Toponymy ==
The origin of the name Tocoa, is a demonym originating from "Tocoacin" which means place of green ears and land of corn, and of "Toctlihacan" possessive particle indicative of the place. In this place archaeological remains have been found, such as jade stone and obsidian mud. The name of Tocoa is "Tocoana" which means valley of high and green mountains.

== Notable residents ==
- Carlos Escaleras: environmental activist, assassinated in 1997
- Juan López: environmental activist, assassinated in 2024

== See also ==
- C.D.Olimpia Cortes, Honduran soccer club
