= Marcala F.C. =

Honduran football club

- Full name: Marcala Fútbol Club
- League: Liga Nacional de Ascenso de Honduras
Home colours

Marcala Fútbol Club is a Honduran football club, based in Marcala, Honduras.

The club currently plays in Liga de Ascenso de Honduras.
