= Sabá =

- Municipality
- Location in Honduras
- Coordinates: 15°31′05″N 86°13′50″W
- Country: Honduras
- Department: Colón

Area
  - Municipality: 371 km^{2} (143 sq mi)
- Elevation: 80 m (262 ft)

Population (2023 projection)
  - Municipality: 33,879
  - Density: 91.3/km^{2} (237/sq mi)
  - Urban: 23,031

Sabá is a town, with a population of 17,080 (2023 calculation), and a municipality in the Honduran department of Colón.

== Sports ==
The local football club, Unión Sabá, play in the Honduran second division. They play at the Estadio Municipal.
