= Villanueva, Honduras =

Villanueva
- Municipality
- Location within Honduras
- Coordinates: 15°19′N 88°1′W
- Country: Honduras
- Department: Cortés

Area
  - Municipality: 349 km^{2} (135 sq mi)
- Elevation: 103 m (338 ft)

Population (2023 projection)
  - Municipality: 190,085
  - Density: 545/km^{2} (1,410/sq mi)
  - Urban: 166,510

Villanueva is a city, with a population of 190,085 (2023 calculation), and a municipality in the Honduran department of Cortés.

Villanueva lies south of San Pedro Sula by approximately 20 miles. The city and surrounding towns such as Dos Caminos lie on the main highway connecting the cities of San Pedro Sula and the capital city Tegucigalpa.

Many manufacturing facilities and agricultural areas are located within the department. The majority of the population is employed by the textile, plastic, and other factories within the department. Sugarcane is the primary crop grown within the department. The presence of sugarcane production tends to cover the area with a thick layer of what the locals call "el nieve negra“, which means “black snow”.

== Demographics ==
The large majority of the population are of Latin descent with small communities of Garifuna people throughout.

Poverty is endemic throughout the area, with many people without clean drinking water or stable electricity. Power and water outages are common.
