= Unión Sabá =

Honduran football club

- Ground: Estadio Municipal; Sabá, Honduras
- Chairman: Arnulfo Vargas
- League: Liga Nacional de Ascenso de Honduras

Unión Sabá is a Honduran football club based in Sabá, Honduras.
