= Sonaguera =

- Municipality
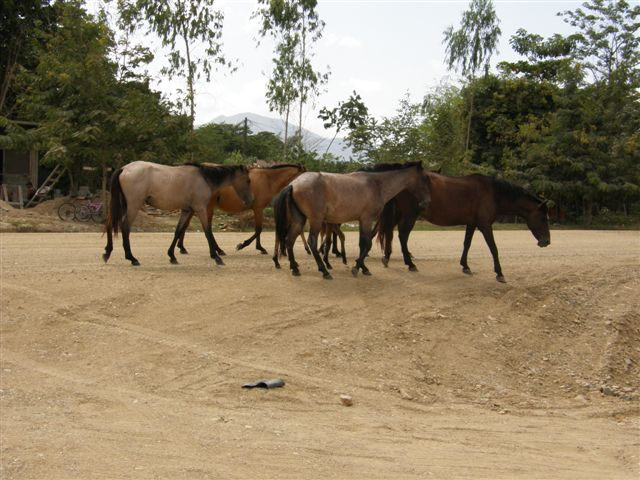
- Sonaguera countryside - mountains in the background

- Location in Honduras
- Coordinates: 15°38′N 86°20′W
- Country: Honduras
- Department: Colón

Area
  - Total: 403 km^{2} (156 sq mi)

Population (2023 projection)
  - Total: 48,087
  - Density: 119/km^{2} (309/sq mi)

Sonaguera is a town, with a population of 15,730 (2023 calculation), and a municipality in the Department of Colón, Honduras, Central America, located approximately one hour southeast of La Ceiba.

Sonaguera Municipality has a population of 48,087.

The area surrounding Sonaguera is principally agricultural, with the major crop being oranges. Both Valencia and Pina oranges are grown in the region. The Association of Citricultores, Sonaguera, Colon (ACISON) represents the orange growers of the region.

Map of Honduras showing Sonaguera
