= Santa Cruz de Yojoa =

- Municipality
- Seal Coat of arms

- Location within Honduras
- Coordinates: 14°59′N 87°54′W
- Country: Honduras
- Department: Cortés

Area
  - Municipality: 734 km^{2} (283 sq mi)

Population (2023 projection)
  - Municipality: 97,848
  - Density: 133/km^{2} (345/sq mi)
  - Urban: 39,237

Santa Cruz de Yojoa is a town, with a population of 20,960 (2023 calculation), and a municipality in the Honduran department of Cortés.

Santa Cruz de Yojoa is located approximately 50 miles south of San Pedro Sula on top of a large hillside on the way to the dam that supplies power to many Central American cities. Santa Cruz de Yojoa, over the years, has become a large populated city, with its central park known as "Parque Central de Santa Cruz de Yojoa" which translated into English means "Santa Cruz de Yojoa Central Park". SCDY is home to 2 churches, one being Catholic and the other Christian of a different denomination. Santa cruz owns more than 10 transportation buses which have its route through Santa Cruze's only paved street. 1 of said buses are stored in SCDY's main hotel, Los Amigos hotel.
