= Yoro F.C. =

Honduran football club

Yoro FC
- Full name: Yoro Football Club
- Nickname: Los Yoreños
- Ground: Estadio Olímpico Yoreño; Yoro, Yoro, Honduras
- League: Liga Nacional de Ascenso de Honduras
| Home colours | Away colours |

Yoro FC is a Honduran football club based in Yoro, Yoro, Honduras.

== History ==
They were relegated to Liga Mayor for the 2008/2009 season. Later, they participated in the 2012–13 season finishing twice in the semifinals only to lose to Juticalpa on both occasions.

== Achievements ==
- Liga de Ascenso

Runners-up (3): 2010–11 A, 2012–13 C, 2016–17 A

- Yoro Championship

Winners (1): 1962
