= Trujillo F.C. =

Honduran football club

Trujillo FC
- Full name: Trujillo FC
- Ground: Trujillo Municipal Stadium; Trujillo, Honduras
- Capacity: 500
- League: Liga Nacional de Ascenso de Honduras
Home colours

Trujillo FC is a Honduran football club based in Trujillo, Honduras.

They play in the Liga Nacional de Ascenso de Honduras.

In 2015, they qualified for the second round of the Copa Presidente after eliminating third division side Las Mercedes, but were eliminated in the next round. They maintain a rivalry with Social Sol FC.

== Stadium ==
Their home venue is the Estadio Jorge Leonidas García.
