= Yoro =

- Municipality
- Location in Honduras
- Coordinates: 15°8′N 87°8′W
- Country: Honduras
- Department: Yoro
- Villages: 19
- Established: 1791

Area
  - Municipality: 2,264 km^{2} (874 sq mi)

Population (2022 projection)
  - Municipality: 101,849
  - Density: 44.99/km^{2} (116.5/sq mi)
  - Urban: 31,777
- Time zone: UTC-6 (Central America)
- Postal code: 23101
- Climate: Aw

Yoro, with a population of 101,849 (2022 calculation), is the capital city of the Yoro Department of Honduras and the municipal seat of Yoro Municipality. It is notable for a local event known as Lluvia de Peces, where it is claimed that strong storms make fish fall from the sky.

== Demographics ==
At the time of the 2013 Honduras census, Yoro municipality had a population of 86,665. Of these, 86.52% were Mestizo, 10.65% Indigenous (10.05% Tolupan, 0.41% Lenca), 1.98% White, 0.80% Black or Afro-Honduran and 0.05% others.
