= Yoro Department =

Yoro Department Departamento de Yoro
- Department
- Location of Yoro in Honduras
- Coordinates: 15°08′N 87°06′W
- Country: Honduras
- Capital: Yoro
- Largest city: El Progreso
- Municipalities: 11
- Villages: 253
- Founded: 28 June 1825 (Note: Yoro was one of the first 7 departments in which the national territory was divided in the first political division of Honduras in 1825.)

Government
  - Type: Departmental
  - Governor: Tomas Ponce (2022-2026) (LibRe)

Area
  - Total: 7,787 km^{2} (3,007 sq mi)

Population (2015)
  - Total: 587,375
  - Density: 75.43/km^{2} (195.4/sq mi)

GDP (Nominal, 2015 US dollar)
  - Total: $1.7 billion (2023)
  - Per capita: $2,400 (2023)

GDP (PPP, 2015 int. dollar)
  - Total: $3.6 billion (2023)
  - Per capita: $5,000 (2023)
- Time zone: UTC-6 (CDT)
- Postal code: 53101
- ISO 3166 code: HN-YO
- HDI (2021): 0.609 medium · 5th of 18
- Statistics derived from Consult INE online database: Population and Housing Census 2013

Yoro is one of the 18 departments into which Honduras is divided. The department contains rich agricultural lands, concentrated mainly on the valley of the Aguan River and the Sula Valley, on opposite ends. The departmental capital is Yoro. The department covers a total surface area of 7,939 km^{2} and, in 2005, had an estimated population of 503,886 people. It is famous for the Lluvia de peces (rain of fishes), a tradition by which fish fall from the sky during very heavy rains.

== Municipalities ==
1. Arenal
2. El Negrito
3. El Progreso
4. Jocón
5. Morazán
6. Olanchito
7. Santa Rita
8. Sulaco
9. Victoria
10. Yorito
11. Yoro

== Demographics ==
At the time of the 2013 Honduras census, Yoro Department had a population of 570,595. Of these, 88.12% were Mestizo, 7.26% White, 3.79% Indigenous (2.92% Tolupan, 0.39% Chʼortiʼ, 0.28% Lenca, 0.09% Nahua), 0.71% Black or Afro-Honduran and 0.12% others.

== Economy ==
The department, historically, is known for harvesting mahogany and cedar trees for exportation. The area also had a cattle industry.

== Football players from Yoro ==
A number of football players are from the department.

Name	Club	City
Carlos Pavón	Real España	El Progreso
Milton Reyes	Motagua	Jocón
Sergio Mendoza	Motagua	Yoro
Johnny Leverón	Motagua	Yoro
Alfredo Mejía	Real España	El Negrito
Éver Alvarado	Real España	El Negrito
Juan C. Acevedo	Real España	El Progreso
Johnny Rivera	Real España	El Progreso
Leonardo Isaula	Necaxa	Yoro
Anthony Lozano	Alcoyano	Yoro
Wilfredo Bueso Valle	Platense F.C.	El Progreso
