= Atlético Esperanzano =

Honduran football club

- Full name: Club Atlético Esperanzano
- Founded: 25 August 1940; 85 years ago
- Ground: Estadio Romualdo Bueso; La Esperanza, Honduras
- Capacity: 3,000
- Manager: Miguel Fajardo
- League: Liga de Ascenso
Home colours	Away colours

Atlético Esperanzano is a Honduran football club based in La Esperanza, Honduras, founded in 1940 by lawyer José María Palacios Cantarero. The club currently plays in Liga de Ascenso.

== Managers ==
- (Honduras) Rufino Domínguez
- (Honduras) Carlos Padilla
- (Honduras) Carlos Suazo
- (Honduras) Conrado Padilla
- (Honduras) Romualdo Bueso
- (Honduras) Narcizo Rodríguez (2011)
