= Colón Department (Honduras) =

Colón Department Departamento de Colón
- Department
- Flag Coat of arms

- Location of Colón in Honduras
- Coordinates: 15°55′N 86°0′W
- Country: Honduras
- Municipalities: 10
- Villages: 127
- Founded: 19 December 1881
- Capital city: Trujillo
- Largest city: Tocoa

Government
  - Governor: Elda Mejía (2026-2030) (PN)

Area
  - Total: 8,276 km^{2} (3,195 sq mi)

Population (2013)
  - Total: 319,786
  - Density: 38.64/km^{2} (100.1/sq mi)

GDP (Nominal, 2015 US dollar)
  - Total: $1.0 billion (2023)
  - Per capita: $2,500 (2023)

GDP (PPP, 2015 int. dollar)
  - Total: $2.0 billion (2023)
  - Per capita: $5,200 (2023)
- Time zone: UTC-6 (CDT)
- Postal code: 32101
- ISO 3166 code: HN-CL
- HDI (2021): 0.599 medium · 7th of 18
- Statistics derived from Consult INE online database: Population and Housing Census 2013

Colón is one of the 18 departments into which Honduras is divided. It was created in 1881. The departmental capital is Trujillo, and the other main city is Tocoa. Trujillo was the site of the first Catholic mass on the American mainland, held when Christopher Columbus (Cristóbal Colón) reached the Honduran shore in 1502.

Colón harbors a substantial Garifuna population and has pristine beaches and rainforested national parks. The Fort of Santa Barbara, built by the Spaniards in the colonial era, was the site of the execution of US filibuster William Walker in Trujillo, and his remains are buried in the city's graveyard.

The department covers a total surface area of 8,875 km^{2} and, in 2007, had an estimated population of 284,900 people.

== Municipalities ==
1. Balfate
2. Bonito Oriental
3. Iriona
4. Limón
5. Sabá
6. Santa Fe
7. Santa Rosa de Aguán
8. Sonaguera
9. Tocoa
10. Trujillo
