= List of islands of Honduras =

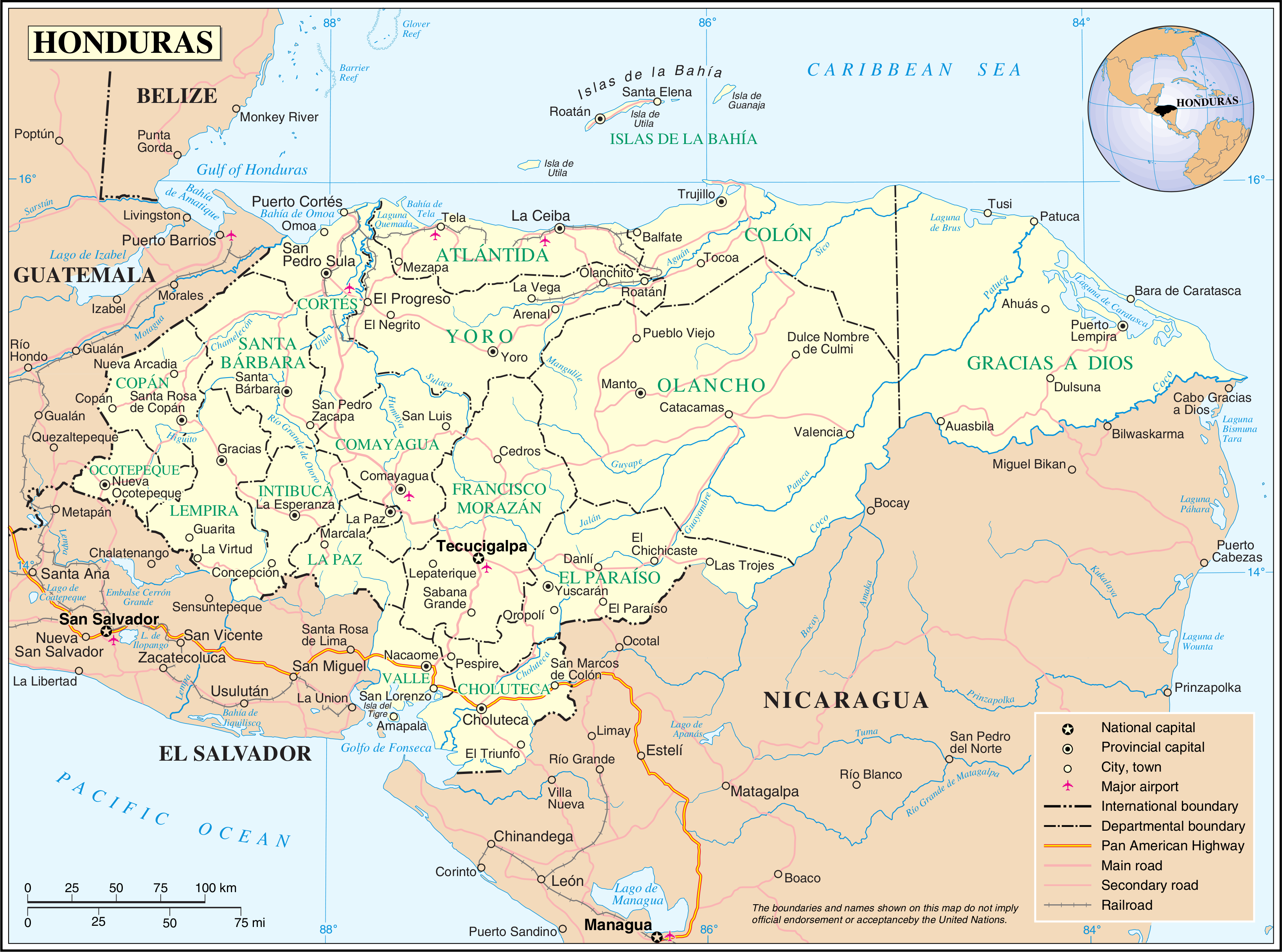
Honduras

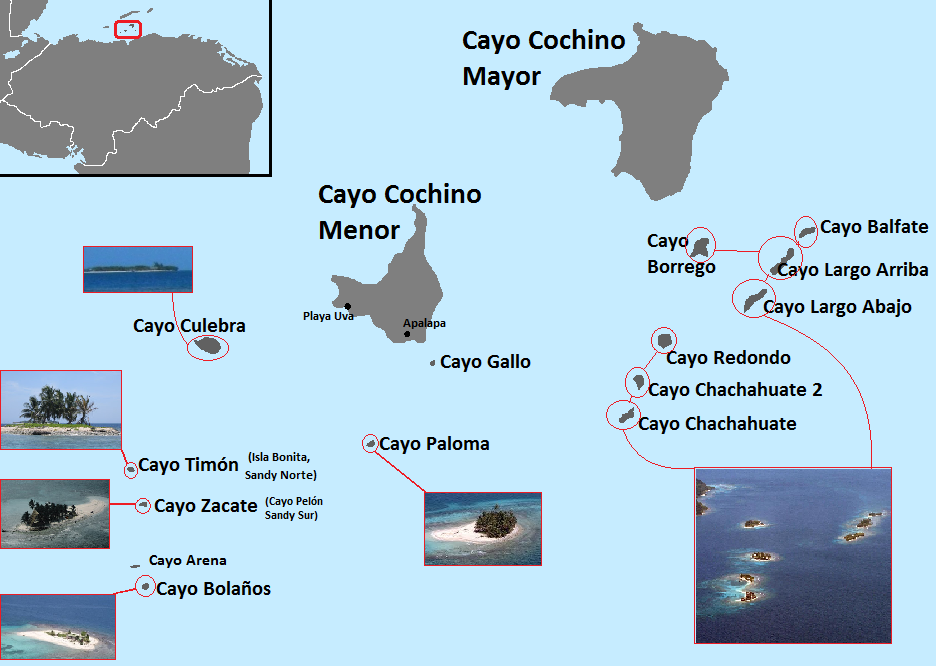
Cayos Cochinos

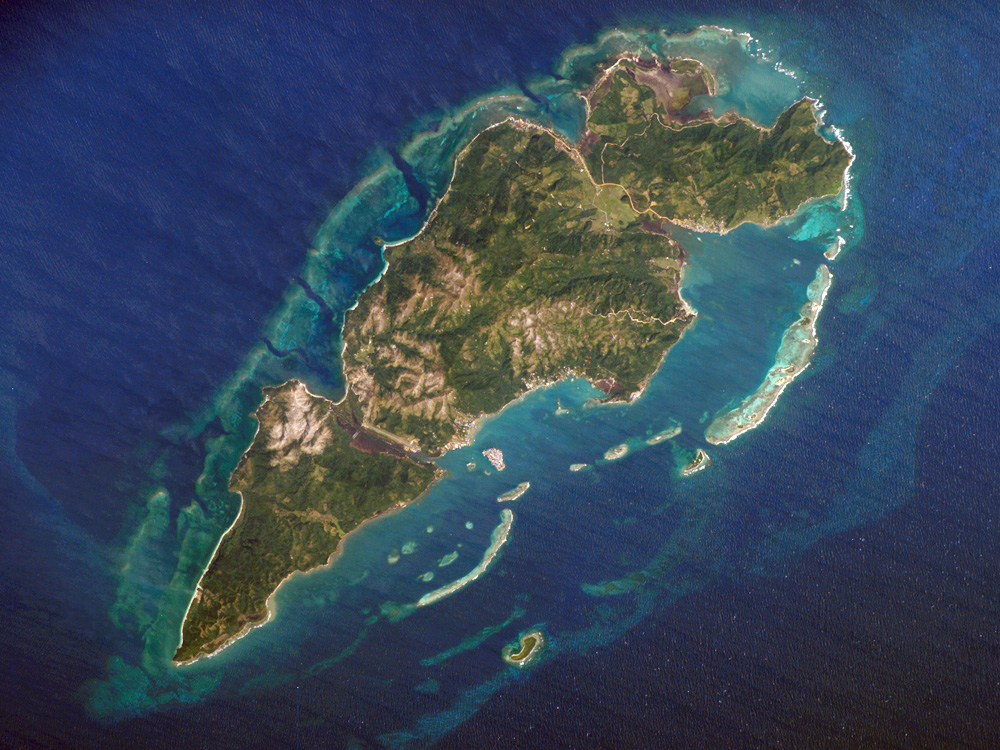
Guanaja

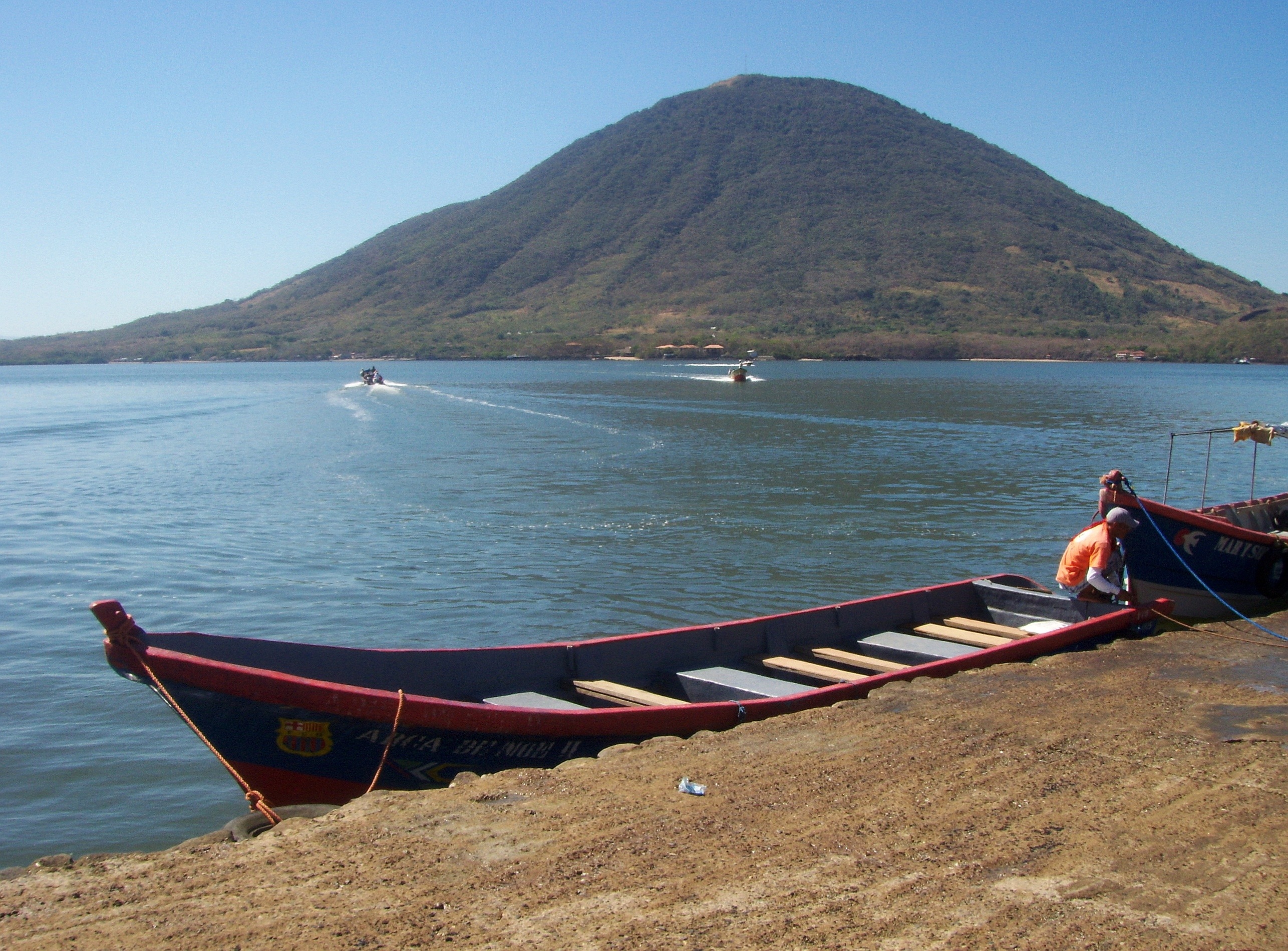
Isla del Tigre

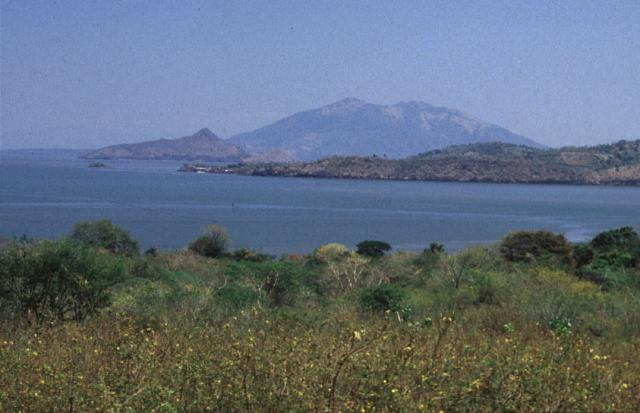
Isla Zacate Grande

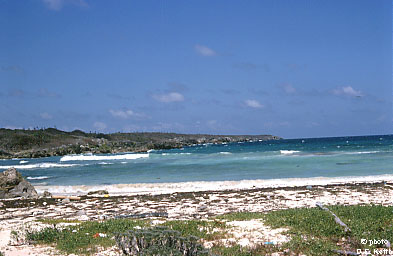
Little Swan Island

This is a list of islands of Honduras. There are at least 99 islands in Honduras.

== Islands ==
The following islands are part of Honduras:

- Caribbean islands
  - Bobel Cay, 15°05′00″N 82°40′00″W
  - Cayos Cochinos (Islas de la Bahía), 15°58′00″N 86°28′00″W
    - Cayo Cochino Grande (Mayor), 15°59′13″N 86°28′39″W
    - Cayo Cochino Menor, 15°57′30″N 86°30′05″W
    - Cayo Culebra, 15°57′14″N 86°31′10″W
    - Cayo Gallo
    - Cayo Timon
    - Cayo Zacate
    - Cayo Arena, 15°57′N 86°33′W
    - Cayo Bolanos
    - Cayo Paloma (nature preserve), 15°56′45″N 86°30′14″W
    - Cayo Borrego
    - Cayo Balfate
    - Cayo Largo Arriba
    - Cayo Redondo, 15°58′00″N 86°30′00″W
    - Cayo Chachahaute 2
    - Cayo Chachahaute, 15°57′06″N 86°28′39″W
  - Islas de la Bahía, 16°20′00″N 86°30′00″W
    - Guanaja (Islas de la Bahía), 16°30′00″N 85°55′00″W
    - Roatán (Islas de la Bahía) (Isla Roatan), 16°22′20″N 86°25′41″W
      - Barbareta (Islas de la Bahía Department), 16°24′00″N 86°08′00″W
    - Utila (Islas de la Bahía), 16°06′00″N 86°56′00″W
  - Savanna Cay, 15°08′00″N 82°34′50″W
  - Cayo Sur, 15°04′00″N 82°30′00″W
  - Swan Islands
    - Isla Grande, 17°24′32″N 83°55′57″W
    - Little Swan Island (Isla Pequeña), 17°24′43″N 83°53′56″W
  - Cayo Gorda, 15°51′30″N 82°24′00″W
- Pacific islands (part of Valle department)
  - Isla Zacate Grande, 13°20′19″N 87°37′41″W
  - Isla del Tigre, 13°15′56″N 87°38′16″W
  - Isla Conejo (disputed island, El Salvador), 13°20′52″N 87°44′34″W

== Disputed Territories ==
- The Sapodilla Cayes are claimed by Honduras and Guatemala, but controlled by Belize

== See also ==
- List of Caribbean islands
- List of islands
