= Langue =

- Municipality
- Location in Honduras
- Coordinates: 13°37′N 87°39′W
- Country: Honduras
- Department: Valle

Area
  - Total: 136.1 km^{2} (52.5 sq mi)

Population (2013)
  - Total: 20,944
  - Density: 153.9/km^{2} (398.6/sq mi)
- Climate: Aw

Langue is a municipality in the department of Valle in Honduras. It covers an area of 136.1 km^{2} (52.5 sq mi) and had a population of 20,944 inhabitants according to the 2013 census.

== History ==
The name "Langue" means "place of canes and reeds" and has its roots in the Nahuatl and Lenca languages. The region was inhabited by indigenous groups before the Spanish arrived, with the earliest mention dating back to 1591, which mentions the town of "San Antonio de Langue". The prefix "San Antonio" was added to the original name, as it was a common practice during the colonial period. The indigenous settlements had been relocated several times over the years, and the Spanish settlers later populated the town, which served as a base for gold mining in the region. In the 1791 population census, it is mentioned as a town in the curacy of Goascorán and was part of the municipality of Tegucigalpa. In the political division of 1896, it is mentioned as a municipality in the Goascorán district. It was elevated to the status of a city on 7 March 1950.

== Geography ==
Langue is located in the department of Valle in Honduras. It borders the municipalities of Aramecina and Curaren to the north, Nacaome to the south, San Francisco de Coray to the east, and Goascorán and Aramecina to the west. The municipality covers an area of 136.1 km^{2} (52.5 sq mi).

Langue has a tropical savanna climate (Köppen climate classification: Aw). The municipality has an average annual temperature of 31.3 °C (88.3 °F) and typically receives about 203.86 mm (8.026 in) of annual precipitation.

== Administrative divisions ==
The municipality comprises six aldeas (villages) and their associated caseríos (hamlets).

Aldeas of Langue
Aldea	Total Population	Men	Women
Langue	7,093	3,345	3,748
Candelaria	2,653	1,307	1,346
Concepción de María o Potrero Grande	3,107	1,604	1,503
Los Llanos	1,631	831	800
San Francisco No.2	1,809	899	910
San Marcos o Tamayo	4,650	2,372	2,278
Total	20,944	10,358	10,586

== Demographics ==
According to the 2013 census, Langue had a total population of 20,944 inhabitants, of whom 10,358 (49.5%) were men and 10,586 (50.5%) were women. About 21.4% of the population was classified as urban and 16,471 residents (78.6%) lived in the rural areas.

By broad age group, 7,631 individuals (36.4%) were aged 0–14 years, 11,889 individuals (56.8%) were aged 15–64, and 1,424 individuals (6.8%) were aged 65 years and over. The median age was 20.6 years and the mean age was 26.4 years. Among the population aged 15 and over, the municipality recorded an illiteracy rate of 20.4%, higher than the departmental average of 17.7%. The municipality had 4,335 occupied private dwellings, with an average of 4.7 persons per occupied dwelling.
