= Alianza, Honduras =

Alianza
- Location in Honduras
- Coordinates: 13°31′N 87°44′W
- Country: Honduras
- Department: Valle
- Villages: 6

Area
  - Total: 205.7 km^{2} (79.4 sq mi)

Population (2013)
  - Total: 7,491
  - Density: 36.42/km^{2} (94.32/sq mi)
- Time zone: UTC-6 (Central America)

Alianza (Spanish pronunciation: [aˈljansa]) is a municipality in the department of Valle in Honduras. It covers an area of 205.7 km^{2} (79.4 sq mi) and had a population of 7,491 inhabitants according to the 2013 census.

== History ==
Alianza was earlier inhabited by the Chʼortiʼ people. It was known as "Hacienda de Mongoya", and was part of the municipality of Goascorán. It was officially elevated as a municipality under the name Alianza in 1847.

== Geography ==
Alianza is located in the department of Valle in Honduras. It borders the municipalities of Goascorán to the north, and Nacaome to the east. It borders the Gulf of Fonseca to the south and shares international border with El Salvador to the west. The municipality covers an area of 205.7 km^{2} (79.4 sq mi).

Located at an elevation of approximately 118.94 m (390.2 ft) above sea level, Alianza has a tropical monsoon climate (Köppen climate classification: Am). The municipality has an average annual temperature of 28.64 °C (83.55 °F) and typically receives about 186.53 mm (7.344 in) of annual precipitation.

== Administrative divisions ==
The municipality comprises six aldeas (villages) and their associated caseríos (hamlets).

Aldeas of Alianza
Aldea	Total Population	Men	Women
Alianza	850	396	454
Alto de Jesús	346	167	179
Los Amates	2,267	1,114	1,153
San Jerónimo	200	99	101
San Pedro Calero	596	287	309
Sonora	3,232	1,528	1,704
Total	7,491	3,590	3,901

== Demographics ==
According to the 2013 census, Alianza had a total population of 7,491 inhabitants, of whom 3,590 (47.9%) were men and 3,901 (52.1%) were women. The entire population was classified as rural.

By broad age group, 2,400 individuals (32.0%) were aged 0–14 years, 4,306 individuals (57.5%) were aged 15–64, and 785 individuals (10.5%) were aged 65 years and over. The median age was 23.5 years and the mean age was 30.0 years. Among the population aged 15 and over, the municipality recorded an illiteracy rate of 22.4%, higher than the departmental average of 17.7%. The municipality had 1,897 occupied private dwellings, with an average of 3.9 persons per occupied dwelling.
