= Caridad =

- Municipality
- Location in Honduras
- Coordinates: 13°50′N 87°41′W
- Country: Honduras
- Department: Valle

Area
  - Total: 51.96 km^{2} (20.06 sq mi)

Population (2013)
  - Total: 3,927
  - Density: 75.58/km^{2} (195.7/sq mi)
- Time zone: UTC-6 (Central America)

Caridad (Spanish pronunciation: [kaɾiˈðað]) is a municipality in the department of Valle in Honduras. It covers an area of 51.96 km^{2} (20.06 sq mi) and had a population of 3,927 inhabitants according to the 2013 census. It is located close to the border with El Salvador.

== History ==
In the 1801 population census, it was recorded as La Caridad Estate, and was part of Nacaome. The estate was privately owned by the Maldonado family from Guatemala, and it was later converted into a public settlement. During the political division in 1825, it became part of Comayagua Department, and it was moved to the La Paz Department in 1869. In 1893, it became part of hte newly formed Valle Department.

== Geography ==
Caridad is located in the department of Valle in Honduras. It borders the municipalities of San Antonio del Norte and Lauterique to the north, Aramecina to the south, and Curaren to the east. It shares international border with El Salvador to the west. The municipality covers an area of 51.96 km^{2} (20.06 sq mi).

Caridad has a tropical monsoon climate (Köppen climate classification: Am). The municipality has an average annual temperature of 31.11 °C (88.00 °F) and typically receives about 202.63 mm (7.978 in) of annual precipitation.

== Administrative divisions ==
The municipality comprises five aldeas (villages) and their associated caseríos (hamlets).

Aldeas of Caridad
Aldea	Total Population	Men	Women
Caridad	1,247	597	650
Hondable No.1	188	105	83
La Esperanza	1,084	545	539
Las Delicias	769	370	399
San Antonio	641	308	333
Total	3,927	1,925	2,002

== Demographics ==
According to the 2013 census, Caridad had a total population of 3,927 inhabitants, of whom 1,925 (49.0%) were men and 2,002 (51.0%) were women. The entire population was classified as rural.

By broad age group, 1,377 individuals (35.1%) were aged 0–14 years, 2,242 individuals (57.1%) were aged 15–64, and 308 individuals (7.8%) were aged 65 years and over. The median age was 22.5 years and the mean age was 27.6 years. Among the population aged 15 and over, the municipality recorded an illiteracy rate of 13.4%, lower than the departmental average of 17.7%. The municipality had 874 occupied private dwellings, with an average of 4.4 persons per occupied dwelling.
