= Aramecina =

- Municipality
- Location in Honduras
- Coordinates: 13°45′N 87°43′W
- Country: Honduras
- Department: Valle

Area
  - Total: 100.4 km^{2} (38.8 sq mi)

Population (2013)
  - Total: 7,173
  - Density: 71.44/km^{2} (185.0/sq mi)
- Time zone: UTC-6 (Central America)

Aramecina (Spanish pronunciation: [aɾameˈsina]) is a municipality in the department of Valle in Honduras. It covers an area of 100.4 km^{2} (38.8 sq mi) and had a population of 7,173 inhabitants according to the 2013 census.

== History ==
The village of Santa Lucia was established in 1578 in the Apasapo river basin, after the discovery of minerals in the Potosí hills in the region. In 1740, the municipality of Apasapo was established, which later became part of the Valle department in 1893, with Santa Lucia as its seat. In 1907, the municipal seat was relocated to a new settlement, which was named "San Sebastián de Aramecina", with Aramecina meaning "river of small Magüey plants". During the Football War, in July 1969, El Salvador attacked Honduras. The El Salvador Air Force bombed Honduras, and the ground units plundered the town, with the majority of the population fleeing east.

== Geography ==
Aramecina is located in the department of Valle in Honduras. It borders the municipalities of Caridad to the north, Langue to the east, and Goascorán to the south. It shares an international border with the Republic of El Salvador to the west, which is demarcated by the Goascoran River. The municipality covers an area of 100.4 km^{2} (38.8 sq mi).

Located at an elevation of approximately 118.94 m (390.2 ft) above sea level, Aramecina has a tropical monsoon climate (Köppen climate classification: Am). The municipality has an average annual temperature of 28.51 °C (83.32 °F) and typically receives about 185.69 mm (7.311 in) of precipitation annually.

== Administrative divisions ==
The municipality comprises 12 aldeas (villages) and their associated caseríos (hamlets).

Aldeas of Aramecina
Aldea	Total Population	Men	Women
Aramecina	1,218	555	663
El Cantíl	270	120	150
El Pedregal	501	259	242
El Tablón	94	48	46
La Peña	347	145	202
Las Pozas	887	441	446
Los Terreros	580	277	303
Macuelizo	320	161	159
Sampito	674	324	350
Santa Lucía	682	320	362
Solubre	1,160	574	586
Tierra Blanca	440	208	232
Total	7,173	3,432	3,741

== Demographics ==
According to the 2013 census, Aramecina had a total population of 7,173 inhabitants, of whom 3,432 (47.8%) were men and 3,741 (52.2%) were women. The entire population was classified as rural.

By broad age group, 2,679 individuals (37.3%) were aged 0–14 years, 4,002 individuals (55.8%) were aged 15–64, and 492 individuals (6.9%) were aged 65 years and over. The median age was 20.0 years and the mean age was 26.0 years. Among the population aged 15 and over, the municipality recorded an illiteracy rate of 18.6%, higher than the departmental average of 17.7%. The municipality had 1,516 occupied private dwellings, with an average of 4.6 persons per occupied dwelling.
