= Nacaome =

- Municipality
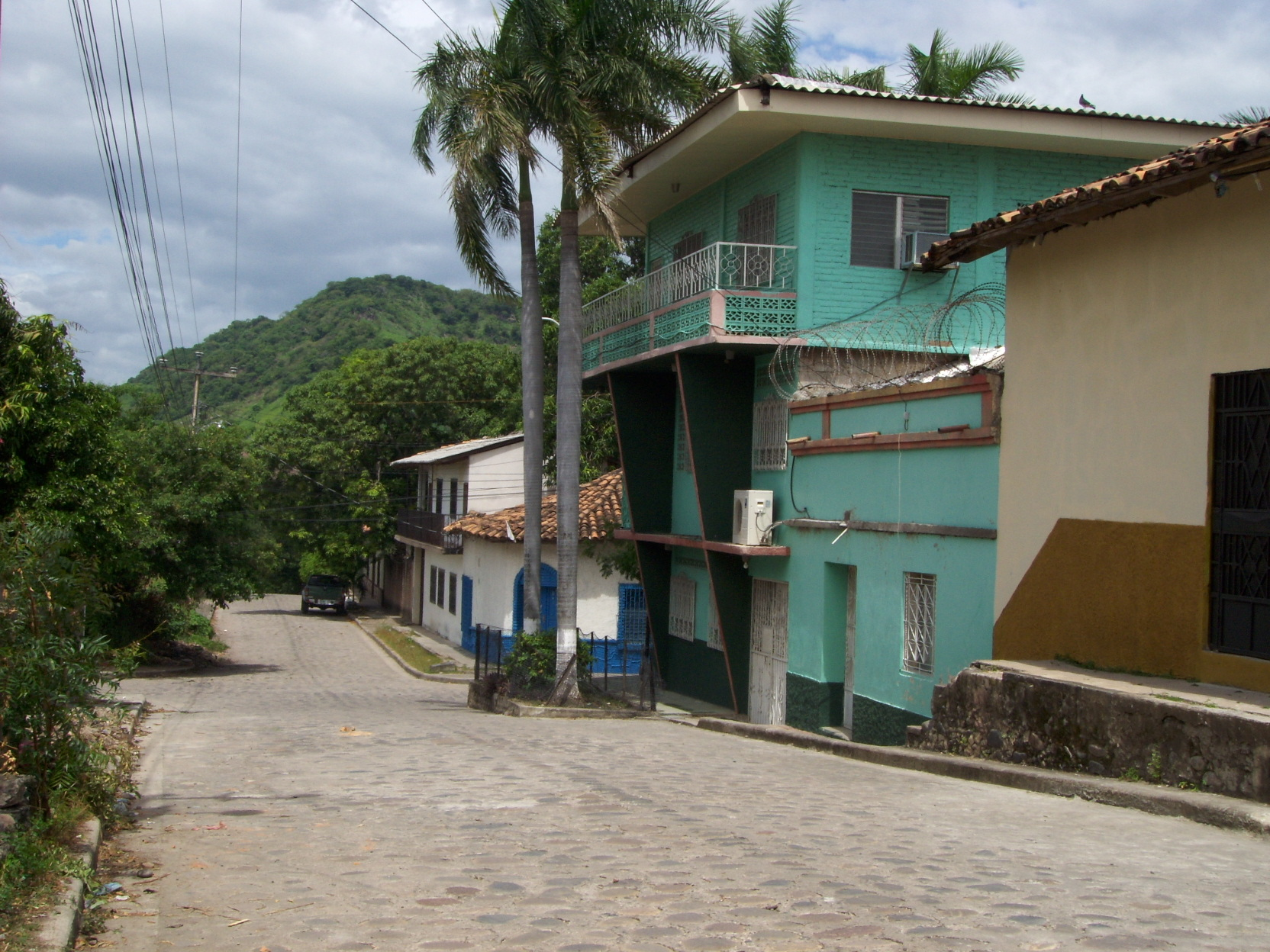
- Street view in Nacaome, Honduras

- Location in Honduras
- Coordinates: 13°31′N 87°29′W
- Country: Honduras
- Department: Valle
- Villages: 9

Area
  - Total: 589.2 km^{2} (227.5 sq mi)

Population (2013)
  - Total: 57,345
  - Density: 97.33/km^{2} (252.1/sq mi)
- Time zone: UTC-6 (Central America)
- Climate: Aw

Nacaome is a municipality in the department of Valle in Honduras. It covers an area of 589.2 km^{2} (227.5 sq mi) and had a population of 57,345 inhabitants according to the 2013 census.

== History ==
Nacaome was established in 1535, when two rival indigenous tribal groups, the Cholulas and Chaparrastiques, came together to form a new settlement along the Nacaome River. The name "Nacome" means "union of two races" in Nahuatl.

The Spanish colonilaists arrived in 1535 and established the first church. It was elevated to a municipality in the same year, and became a city in 1845.

== Geography ==
Nacome is located in the department of Valle in Honduras. It borders the municipalities of Langue and San Francisco de Coray to the north, Pespire and San Lorenzo to the east, Amapala to the south and Goascorán and Alianza to the west. The municipality covers an area of 589.2 km^{2} (227.5 sq mi).

Nacome has a tropical savannah climate (Köppen climate classification: Aw). The municipality has an average annual temperature of 28.46 °C (83.23 °F) and typically receives about 185.35 mm (7.297 in) of annual precipitation.

== Administrative divisions ==
The municipality comprises 10 aldeas (villages) and their associated caseríos (hamlets).

Aldeas of Nacaome
Aldea	Total Population	Men	Women
Nacaome	18,213	8,592	9,621
Agua Caliente	6,958	3,347	3,611
El Rosario	7,233	3,494	3,739
El Tabacal	1,700	831	869
El Tular	7,072	3,518	3,554
Guacirope	1,345	692	653
Moropocay	5,725	2,910	2,815
San Antonio	1,475	726	749
San Nicolás Arriba	575	285	290
San Rafael	7,050	3,419	3,631
Total	57,345	27,814	29,531

== Demographics ==
According to the 2013 census, Nacaome had a total population of 57,345 inhabitants, of whom 27,814 (48.5%) were men and 29,531 (51.5%) were women. About 42.4% of the population was classified as urban and 33,012 residents (57.6%) in the rural areas.

By broad age group, 20,567 individuals (35.9%) were aged 0–14 years, 33,130 individuals (57.8%) were aged 15–64, and 3,648 individuals (6.4%) were aged 65 years and over. The median age was 20.8 years and the mean age was 26.1 years. Among the population aged 15 and over, the municipality recorded an illiteracy rate of 16.9%, lower than the departmental average of 17.7%. The municipality had 12,351 occupied private dwellings, with an average of 4.5 persons per occupied dwelling.

== Economy ==
The major economic activities include agriculture, majorly maize, melons, and beans, shrimp production, and salt farming. In May 2015, a solar power plant with an annual capacity of 100 megawatts was installed in Nacome, which is one of the largest in the region.
