= Conejo Island =

Disputed island in the Gulf of Fonseca

Conejo
Disputed island Native name: Spanish: Isla Conejo
- Location of Conejo Island

Geography
- Location: Gulf of Fonseca
- Coordinates: 13°20′52″N 87°44′34″W

Administration
- Honduras
- Department: Valle

Claimed by
- El Salvador
- Department: La Unión

Demographics
- Population: temporary military personnels only

Conejo Island, in Spanish Isla Conejo, meaning "rabbit island", lies in the Gulf of Fonseca and is disputed between El Salvador and Honduras.

== History ==
In 1992, the International Court of Justice (ICJ) ruled on the delimitation of bolsones (disputed areas) along the El Salvador–Honduras boundary, OAS intervention and a further ICJ ruling in 2003, full demarcation of the border concluded; the 1992 ICJ ruling advised a tripartite resolution to a maritime boundary in the Gulf of Fonseca advocating Honduran access to the Pacific. Unlike other major islands of the Gulf of Fonseca, Rabbit Island was never put to discussion in the definition even though the government of El Salvador asked for a clarification of the situation of every island in the Gulf of Fonseca. The island, despite its small size, is a strategic point of naval and military value to both Honduras and El Salvador.
