= Tiger Island =

Volcanic island in the Gulf of Fonseca

El Tigre Island
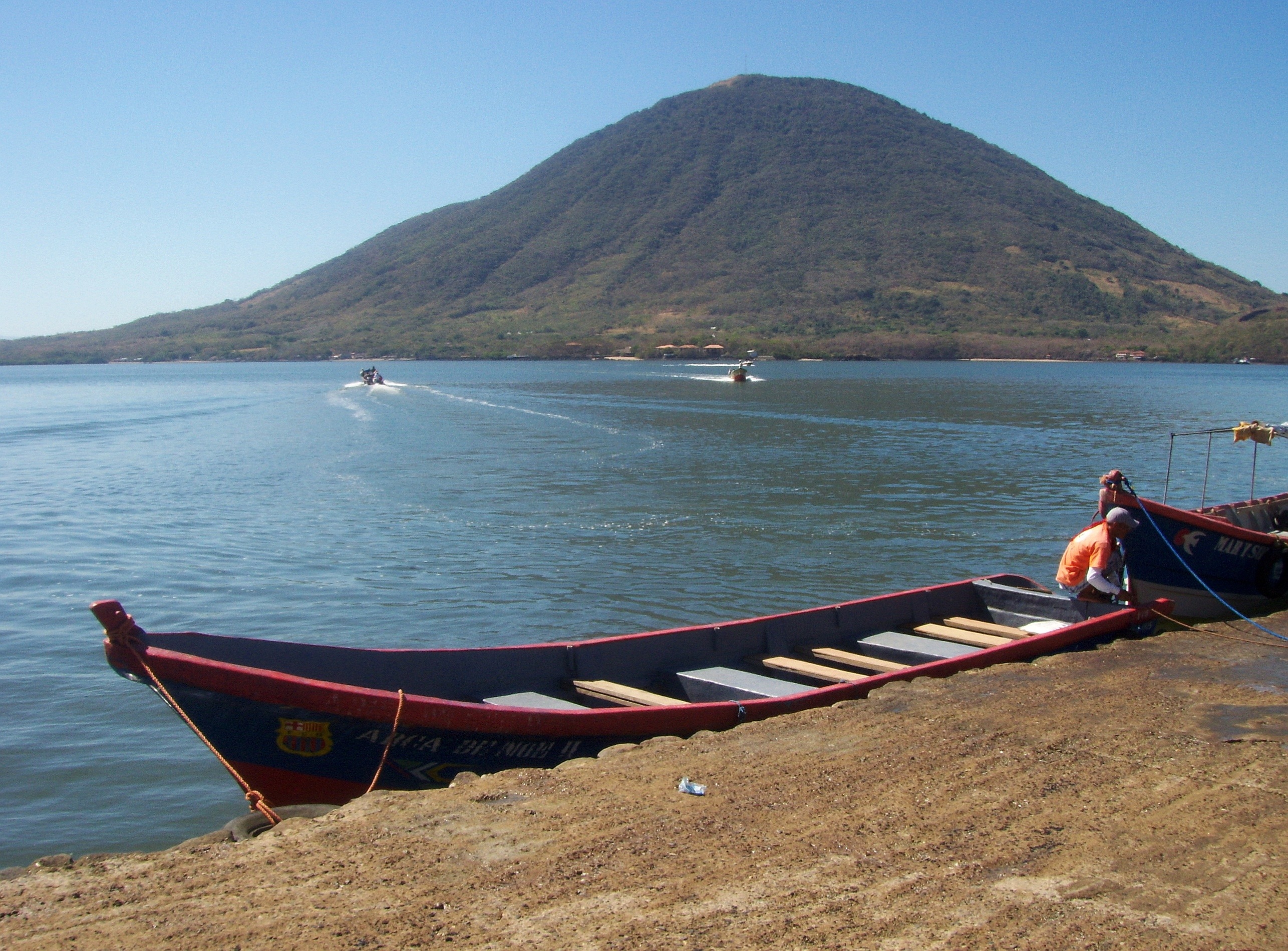
- El Tigre, seen from Coyolito

Highest point
- Elevation: 783 m (2,569 ft)
- Prominence: 783 m (2,569 ft)
- Coordinates: 13.272°N 87.641°W

Geography
- Location: Honduras
- Parent range: Central America Volcanic Arc

Geology
- Rock age: Holocene
- Mountain type: Stratovolcano
- Volcanic arc: Central America Volcanic Arc
- Last eruption: Unknown
- Isla del Tigre Lighthouse
- Foundation: concrete base
- Construction: metal skeletal tower
- Height: 20 m (66 ft)
- Shape: square pyramidal skeletal tower
- Markings: white and red horizontal band
- Power source: solar power
- Focal height: 800 m (2,600 ft)
- Characteristic: Iso R 2s

El Tigre is an island located in the Gulf of Fonseca, a body of water on the Pacific coast of Central America. The island is a conical basaltic stratovolcano and the southernmost volcano in Honduras. It belongs to Valle department. Together with Isla Zacate Grande, Isla Comandante and a few tiny satellite islets and rocks, it forms the municipality of Amapala, with an area of 75.2 km^{2} (29.0 sq mi) and a population of 9,687 as of the census of 2001 (of which 4 were living on Isla Comandante).

Three countries, Honduras, El Salvador, and Nicaragua, have a coastline along the Gulf of Fonseca, and all three have been involved in a lengthy dispute over the rights to the gulf and the islands located therewithin. In 1992, a chamber of the International Court of Justice (ICJ) decided the Land, Island and Maritime Frontier Dispute, of which the gulf dispute was a part. The ICJ determined that El Salvador, Honduras, and Nicaragua were to share control of the Gulf of Fonseca. El Salvador was awarded the islands of Meanguera and Meanguerita, and Honduras was awarded the island of El Tigre.

== See also ==
- List of lighthouses in Honduras
- List of volcanoes in Honduras
- List of islands of Honduras
