= Böbel =

Böbel or Bobel is a German-language surname. Notable people with this surname include:

- Ingo Böbel (1947–2020), German political scientist and economist
- Tomasz Bobel (born 1974), Polish footballer

== See also ==
- Bobel Cay, island in Honduras
