= List of volcanoes in Honduras =

This is a list of active and extinct volcanoes in Honduras.

== Volcanoes ==
Name	Elevation		Location	Last eruption
Name	meters	feet	Coordinates	Last eruption
Isla el Tigre	783	2569	13.227°N 87.641°W	Holocene
Isla Zacate Grande	640	2100	13.33°N 87.83°W	Holocene
Lake Yojoa	1090	3576	14.98°N 87.98°W	Holocene
Utila Island	74	243	16.10°N 86.90°W	Holocene

== See also ==
- Central America Volcanic Arc
- List of volcanoes in El Salvador
- List of volcanoes in Guatemala
- List of volcanoes in Nicaragua
