= Frederick Chatfield =

British diplomat and consul (1801–1872)

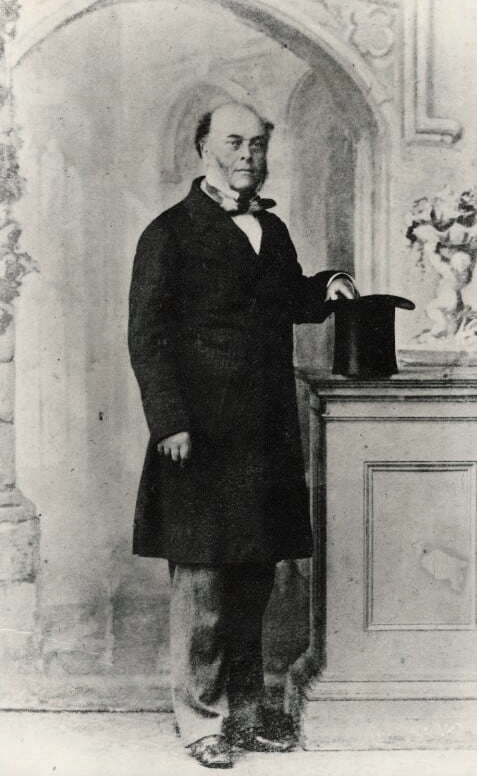
- Portrait of Chatfield from the 1860s
- Born: 1801
- Died: 1872
- Occupation: Diplomat

Frederick Chatfield (6 February 1801 – 30 September 1872) was the United Kingdom's consul in Central America from 1834 to 1852, a key period in the decolonisation of the region.

== Army service ==
Chatfield was commissioned into the Life Guards in 1818, but he found this too expensive and exchanged in 1821 into the 20th Regiment of Foot (now the Lancashire Fusiliers).

== Eastern Europe ==
In 1826 Chatfield was appointed consul at Memel (now Klaipėda). He chanced to be in Aachen during the Belgian Revolution in 1830, and his reports on this and on an outbreak of cholera in Memel in 1831 drew him to the attention of Lord Palmerston, then Foreign Secretary. Early in 1832 he was appointed consul at Warsaw where he went beyond his commercial remit – even suggesting to Palmerston that Poland might some day become useful 'as a Colony to England' – and was withdrawn later that year.

== Central America ==
In March 1833 Palmerston appointed Chatfield to be consul to the Federal Republic of Central America. He spent several months studying the history of the region and learning Spanish, embarked in HMS Belvidera for the West Indies in January 1834 and arrived in British Honduras in May 1834. From then until 1852, with a brief break in 1840–1842, he represented the British government and the interests of British industry in Central America. He worked to protect British economic interests as well as trying to involve his government in more ambitious imperial schemes. He sought protection for British investors and called in the Royal Navy when necessary to force concessions.

In 1842 Chatfield was promoted to "Consul-General in the Republic of Central America" although the Federal Republic had in fact disintegrated the year before. Of the five republics in the former federation, Guatemala and Costa Rica were in the sphere of influence of the United Kingdom while Honduras, El Salvador and Nicaragua were in the sphere of influence of the United States. General Juan José Flores, ex-President of Ecuador, arrived in Costa Rica in mid-1848; he had visited London in 1845–46 and met prominent people including Lord Aberdeen, Palmerston's predecessor as Foreign Secretary. Now he wrote to Palmerston proposing a British protectorate over Costa Rica, and he persuaded President José María Castro to make the same request via his envoy in London. Flores also cultivated Chatfield, who was not convinced: he wrote to Palmerston:

[Flores] is not a man of the day; he belongs to a past period, which makes it hopeless for him to recover a political station in the Equator [Ecuador]. He indulges impracticable theories, and does not perceive the necessity of adapting himself to the times. ... [He should] cease to meddle in the politics of the country ...

The Foreign Office politely declined the protectorate scheme.

== Mosquitia protectorate ==
Britain formally recognised the Kingdom of Mosquitia in 1740 under the Declaration of Edward. Advised by Chatfield, in June 1847 Lord Palmerston defined the borders of the Kingdom, from Cape Honduras in the north, to the San Juan River in the south. When Nicaraguan troops in 1847 occupied Grey Town, at the mouth of the San Juan River, they were repulsed by a British force sent out by the governor of Jamaica (Sir Charles Grey, after whom Grey Town was named).

== Inter-ocean canal ==
In the late 1830s a British engineer, John Baily, was commissioned by a British firm to conduct a study for a transoceanic link across Nicaragua. He proposed a route from San Juan del Sur on the Pacific coast to Lake Nicaragua, then down the San Juan River to Greytown. In February 1840 John Lloyd Stephens, US ambassador and confidant of President Martin Van Buren, visited Nicaragua. He interviewed John Baily and made detailed notes about the results of the study. Stephens left Nicaragua via El Realejo where he met the influential merchant and British Vice-Consul, John Foster. Foster informed his superior Frederick Chatfield in Guatemala.

United States interests also wanted to establish an inter-ocean canal, and in 1849 Chatfield and his American rival, Ephraim Squier, engaged in a diplomatic duel for regional supremacy. Squier negotiated with Honduras for a treaty for a canal from the Caribbean to the Gulf of Fonseca, persuading the government of Honduras to cede the island of El Tigre in the Gulf to the U.S. for 18 months, during which he hoped to conclude the treaty. Chatfield, however, sent HMS Gorgon to pre-emptively seize the island for Britain. But Chatfield had over-reached himself and Palmerston repudiated his action as part of negotiations for the Clayton–Bulwer Treaty which resolved issues in Central America between Britain and the United States. Chatfield was recalled in 1852 and went into retirement.
