= San Francisco de Coray =

- Municipality
- Location in Honduras
- Coordinates: 13°40′N 87°32′W
- Country: Honduras
- Department: Valle
- Villages: 16

Area
  - Total: 89.1 km^{2} (34.4 sq mi)

Population (2013)
  - Total: 9,742
  - Density: 109/km^{2} (283/sq mi)
- Time zone: UTC-6 (Central America)
- Climate: Aw

San Francisco de Coray (Spanish pronunciation: [saɱ fɾanˈsisko ðe koˈɾaj]) is a municipality in the department of Valle in Honduras. It covers an area of 89.1 km^{2} (34.4 sq mi) and had a population of 9,742 inhabitants according to the 2013 census.

== History ==
The municipality is located on a plateau on the banks of the San Francisco de Coray river. It was established during the presidency of José María Medina in 1867.

== Geography ==
San Francisco de Coray is located in the department of Valle in Honduras. It borders the municipalities of Curaren to the north, Nacaome to the south, La Libertad to the north and east, and Langue to the west. The municipality covers an area of 89.1 km^{2} (34.4 sq mi).

San Francisco de Coray has a tropical monsoon climate (Köppen climate classification: Am). The municipality has an average annual temperature of 28.61 °C (83.50 °F) and typically receives about 186.33 mm (7.336 in) of annual precipitation.

== Administrative divisions ==
The municipality comprises 16 aldeas (villages) and their associated caseríos (hamlets).

Aldeas of San Francisco de Coray
Aldea	Total Population	Men	Women
San Francisco de Coray	2,098	1,019	1,079
Caleas No.2	619	301	318
Cerro Grande	373	182	191
El Espino	110	61	49
El Guayabo	202	102	100
El Rodeo	442	227	215
El Salitre	126	64	62
La Cañada o Calea No.1	179	83	96
La Laguna No.1	379	196	183
La Laguna No.2 o Las Flores	371	207	164
Las Delicias	953	481	472
Las Mesas	713	361	352
Los Amates	1,131	586	545
Montecristo	865	439	426
Panasacarán	281	146	135
Talpetates	899	462	437
Total	9,743	4,918	4,825

== Demographics ==
According to the 2013 census, San Francisco de Coray had a total population of 9,743 inhabitants, of whom 4,918 (50.5%) were men and 4,825 (49.5%) were women. About 19.8% of the population was classified as urban and 7,817 residents (80.2%) lived in the rural areas.

By broad age group, 3,670 individuals (37.7%) were aged 0–14 years, 5,473 individuals (56.2%) were aged 15–64, and 600 individuals (6.2%) were aged 65 years and over. The median age was 19.8 years and the mean age was 25.4 years. Among the population aged 15 and over, the municipality recorded an illiteracy rate of 29.4%, higher than the departmental average of 17.7%. The municipality had 2,078 occupied private dwellings, with an average of 4.6 persons per occupied dwelling.
