= List of lighthouses in Honduras =

This is a list of lighthouses in Honduras.

== Lighthouses ==
| Name | Image | Year built | Location & coordinates | Light characteristic | Focal height (metres) | NGA number | Admiralty number | Range (nautical miles) |
|---|---|---|---|---|---|---|---|---|
| Black Rock Point Lighthouse | | | Bay Islands Department | Fl W 9s | 22 | 110-16477 | J6010.5 | 19 |
| Cabo Falso Lighthouse | | | Gracias a Dios Department | Fl W 5s | 23 | 110-16483 | J6014 | 18 |
| Cochino Grande Lighthouse | | | Roatán | Fl W 5s | 157 | 110-16473 | J6009.6 | 18 |
| Isla de Roatán Lighthouse | | | Bay Islands Department | Fl W 9s | 21 | 110-16460 | J6007 | 19 |
| Isla del Tigre Lighthouse | | | Valle Department, | Iso R 2s | 800 | 111-15393 | G3363 | |
| Isla de Utila Lighthouse | | | Bay Islands | F W | 15 | 110-16448 | J6003 | 4 |
| Puerto Cortés Lighthouse | | 1898 | Puerto Cortés | Fl W 5s | 58 | 110-16428 | J5994 | 20 |
| Pumpkin Hill Lighthouse | | 2011 | Bay Islands Department | Fl W 9s | 17 | 110-16447 | J6002 | 17 |
| Punta Caxinas Lighthouse | | | Trujillo | Fl W 10s | 23 | 110-16457 | J6009.7 | 19 |
| Punta Izopo Ligthouse | | | Atlántida Department | Fl W 5s | 40 | 110-16440 | J5999 | 20 |
| Punta Patuca Lighthouse | | | Gracias a Dios Department | Fl W 10s | 22 | 110-16479 | J6013 | 22 |
| Punta Sal Lighthouse | | | Atlántida Department | Fl(4) W 30s | 84 | 110-16432 | J5997 | 15 |
| Roatán lighthouse | | | Bay Islands Department | Fl W 5s | 12 | 110-16461 | J6008.1 | 19 |
| Swan Islands Lighthouse | | | Bay Islands Department | Fl W 5s | 21 | 110-16480 | J6016 | |
| Cape Camaron lighthouse | | | Colón Department | Fl W 5s | 22 | 110-16478 | J6012 | |

== See also ==
- Lists of lighthouses and lightvessels
