= Amapala =

- Municipality
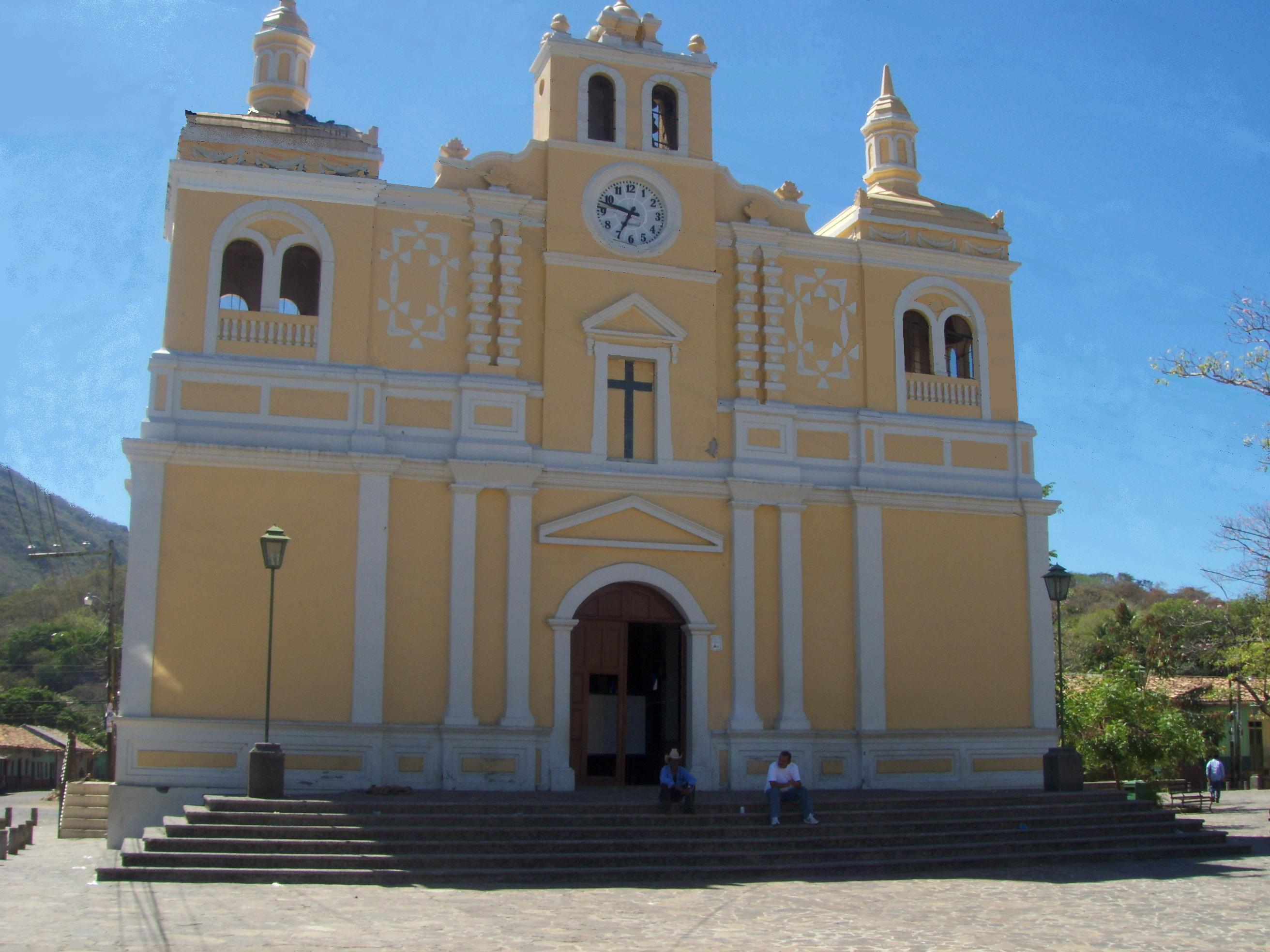
- Catholic cathedral of Amapala

- Location within Honduras
- Coordinates: 13°17′32″N 87°39′14″W
- Country: Honduras
- Department: Valle

Government
  - Mayor: Santos Alberto Cruz Guevara (Liberal Party)

Area
  - Land: 75.2 km^{2} (29.0 sq mi)

Population (2015)
  - Municipality: 12,743
  - Density: 169/km^{2} (439/sq mi)
  - Urban: 2,482
- Time zone: UTC−6 (Central America)

Amapala is a municipality in the Honduran department of Valle.

It is formed by El Tigre Island and its satellite islets and rocks in the Gulf of Fonseca. It has an area of 75.2 km^{2} (29.0 sq mi) and a population of 2,482 as of the census of 2001 (of which 4 people were living on Isla Comandante). Thanks to a natural deep channel, and despite lacking modern infrastructure, Amapala long served as the main Honduran port in the Pacific Ocean.

== History ==
The local legend has it that the name of the island on which Amapala is based is due to the fact that in the 16th century a group of pirates led by the pirate Francis Drake operated on the island. He and his men were considered by the inhabitants of the area as wild and bloody beasts, so they called the island "Cerro de El Tigre". In fact Drake probably never stayed here though some later pirates, like William Dampier, did. The name Amapala derives from Nahuatl and means "close to amates". However, there is an alternate theory that states that it comes from the words "ama" (corn) and "palha" (hill) of the Goajiquiro dialect, and therefore would mean "hill of corn".

Amapala was founded in 1838, and its port was opened and declared free in 1868. During the 19th century it exported large quantities of gold, silver and other ores, although its progress was retarded by the delay in constructing a transcontinental railway from Puerto Cortés. By the mid-1970s, Amapala was gradually replaced in importance by the port of San Lorenzo on the mainland.

A description of the town in 1881 can be found in the book A Lady's Ride Across Spanish Honduras by Mary Lester (a.k.a. Mary Soltera).

In 1895, El Salvador, Honduras, and Nicaragua signed the Treaty of Amapala that established the short-lived Greater Republic of Central America.

== Demographics ==
At the time of the 2013 Honduras census, Amapala municipality had a population of 12,250. Of these, 74.16% were Mestizo, 22.81% White, 1.55% Black or Afro-Honduran, 0.09% Indigenous and 1.39% others.

== Climate ==
This area typically has a pronounced dry season. According to the Köppen climate classification system, Amapala has a tropical savanna climate, abbreviated "Aw" on climate maps.

Climate data for Amapala
Month	Jan	Feb	Mar	Apr	May	Jun	Jul	Aug	Sep	Oct	Nov	Dec	Year
Mean daily maximum °C (°F)	33 (92)	33 (92)	33 (92)	34 (93)	33 (91)	32 (90)	33 (91)	33 (91)	32 (89)	32 (89)	32 (90)	33 (91)	33 (91)
Mean daily minimum °C (°F)	27 (80)	27 (80)	27 (81)	28 (83)	27 (81)	27 (80)	27 (80)	27 (81)	26 (79)	27 (80)	27 (80)	27 (81)	27 (80)
Average precipitation days	0	0	0	2	5	6	5	6	5	2	1	0	32
Source: Weatherbase

== Economy ==
The community receives funds from former residents who have moved to other countries. As of 2013 most residents work as fishermen, while 300 have formal jobs.

== Gallery ==
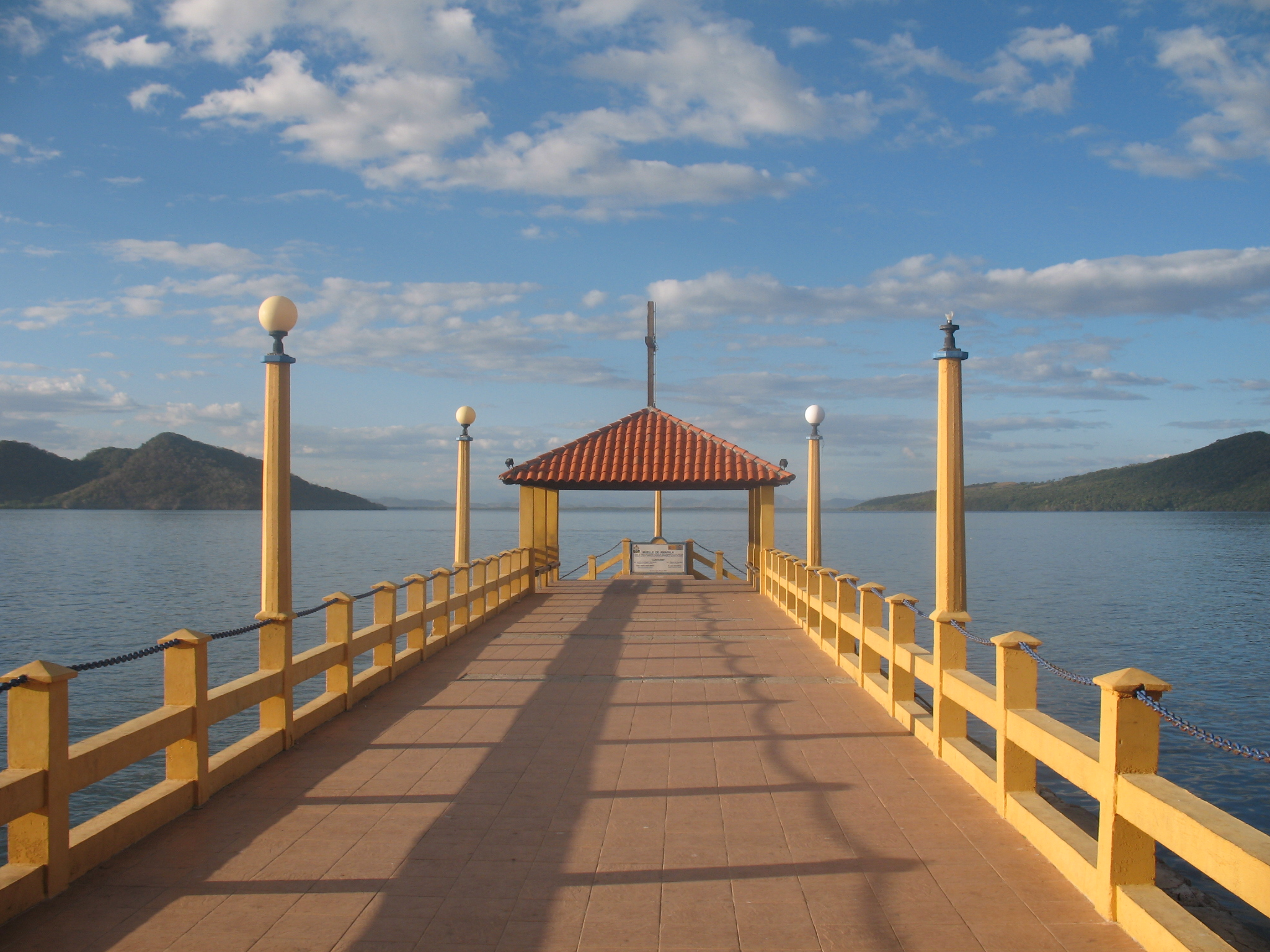
Boardwalk, Puerto de Amapala

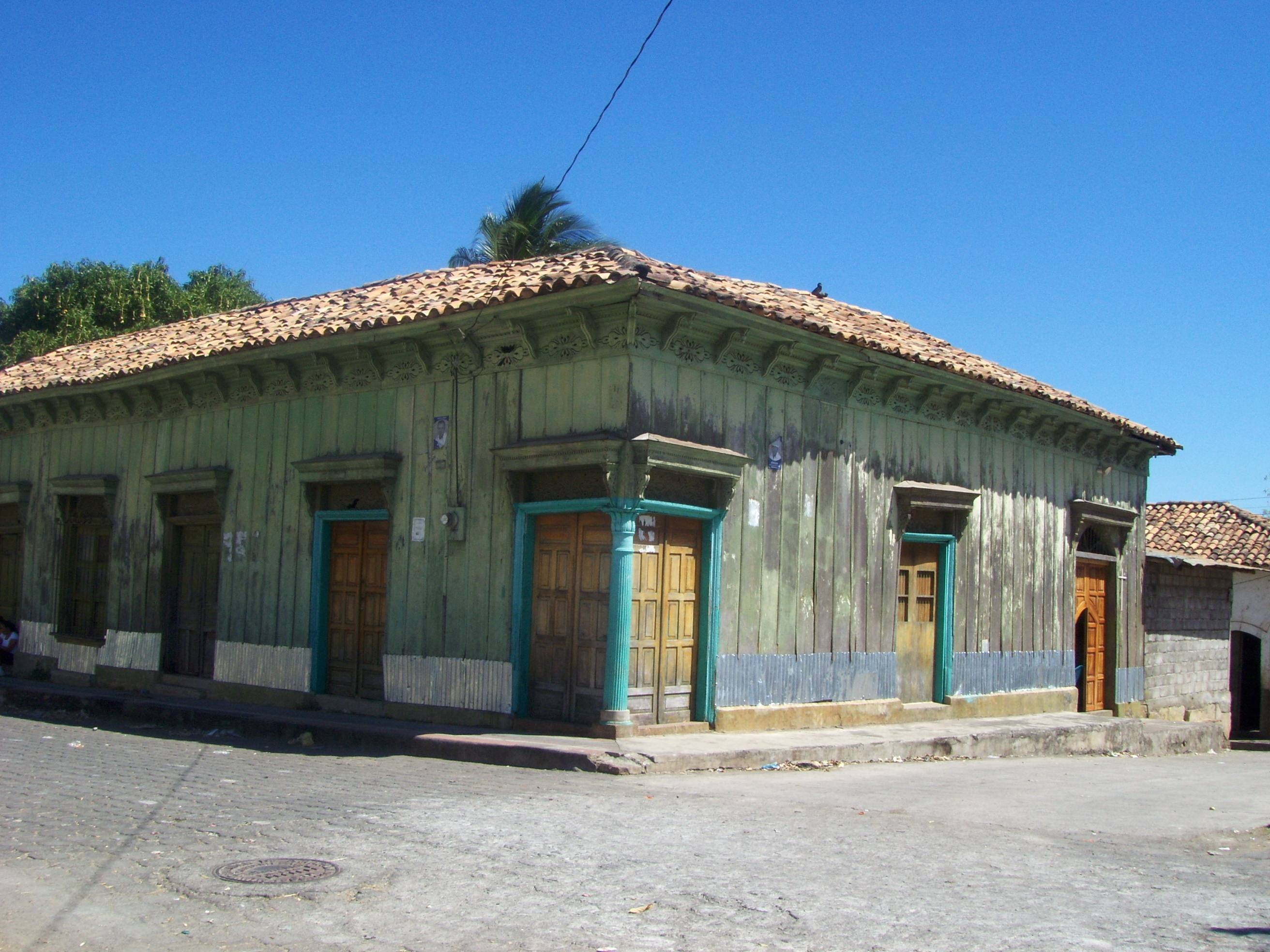
Building at La Plaza de Amapala

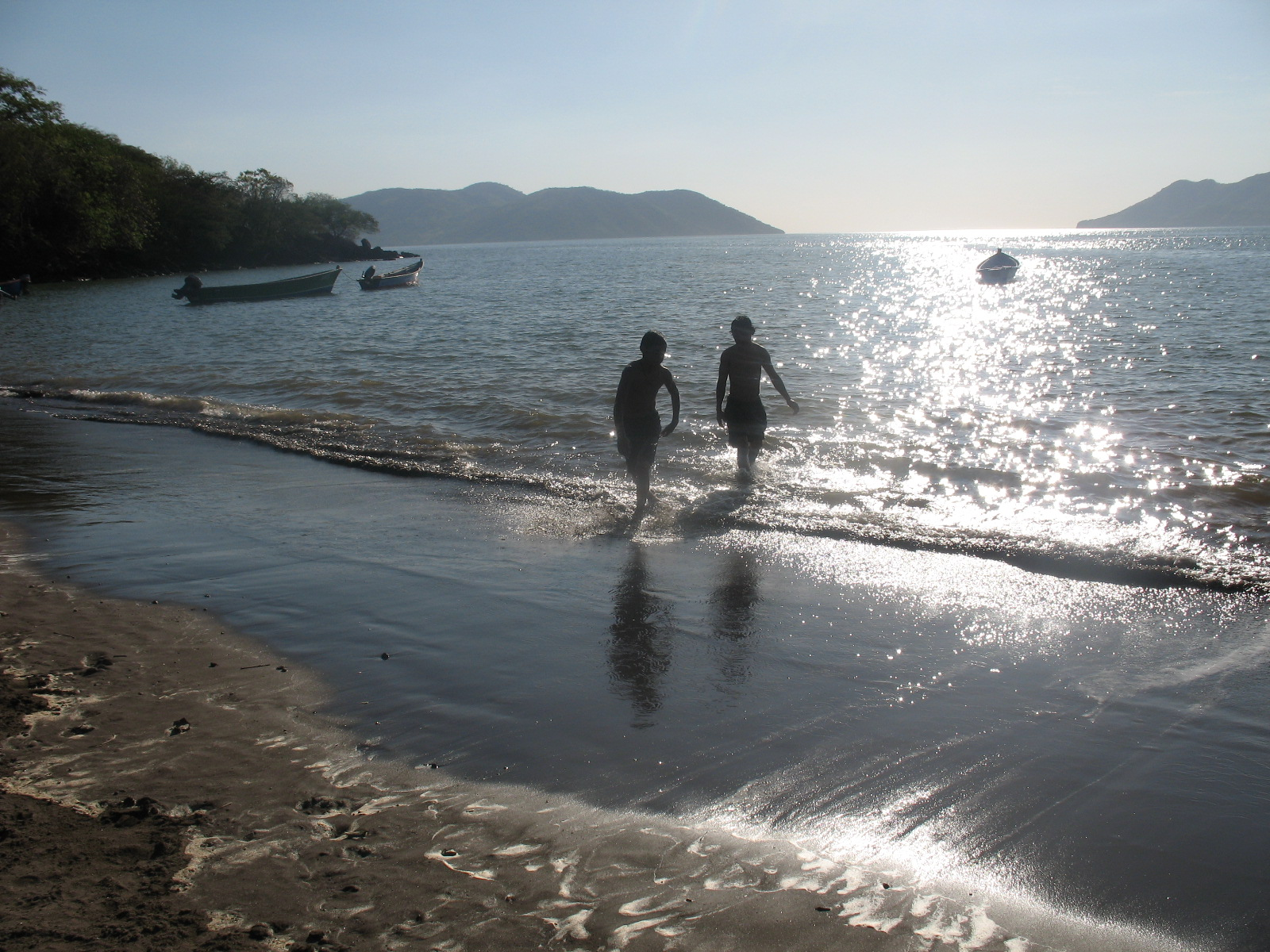
Shore at Amapala
