= Meanguera del Golfo =

- district
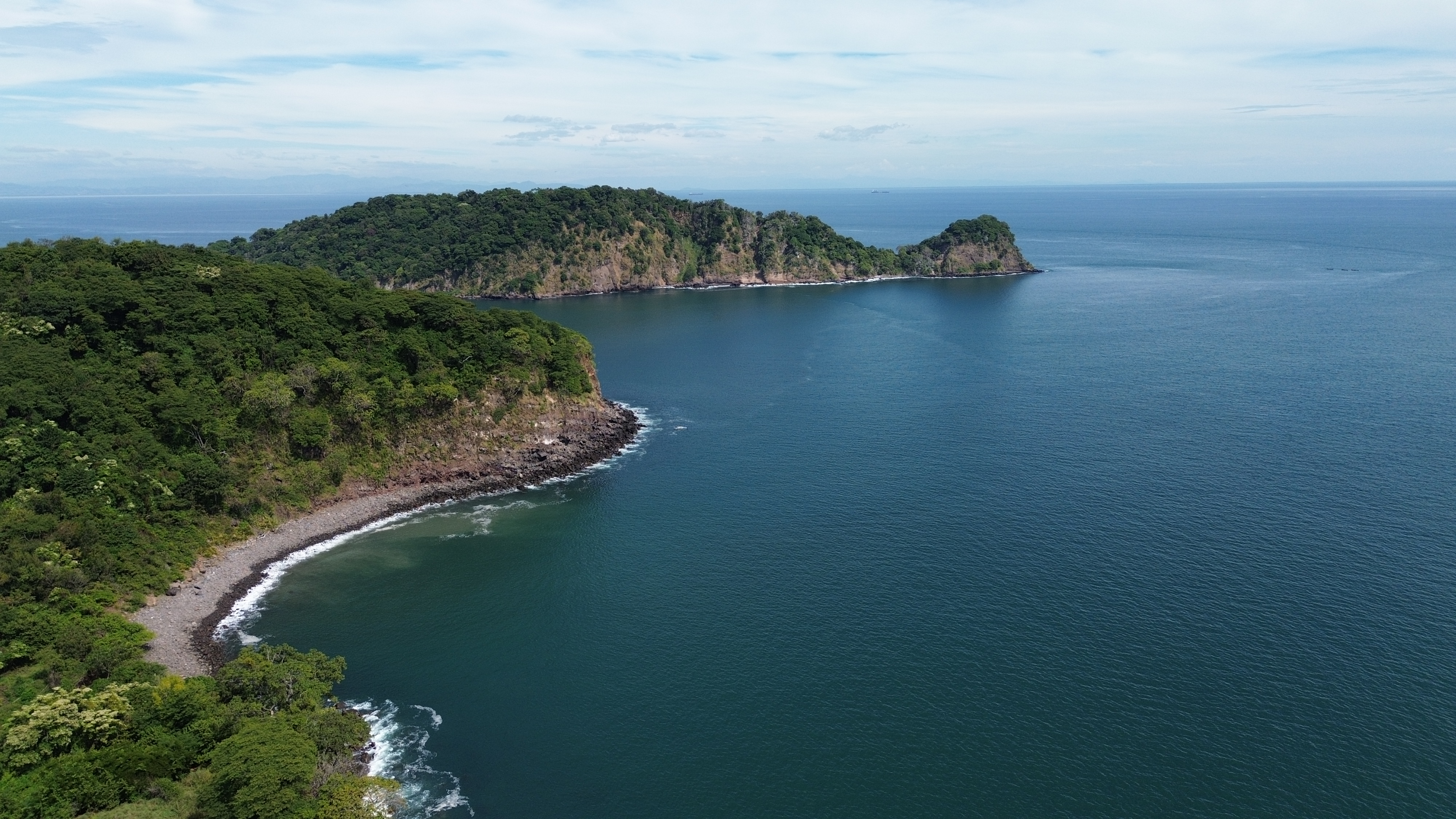

- Location in El Salvador
- Coordinates: 13°10′47″N 87°41′51″W
- Country: El Salvador
- Department: La Unión Department

Area
  - district: 9.1 sq mi (23.6 km^{2})

Population (2024)
  - district: 2,134
  - Rank: 247th in El Salvador
  - Rural: 2,134

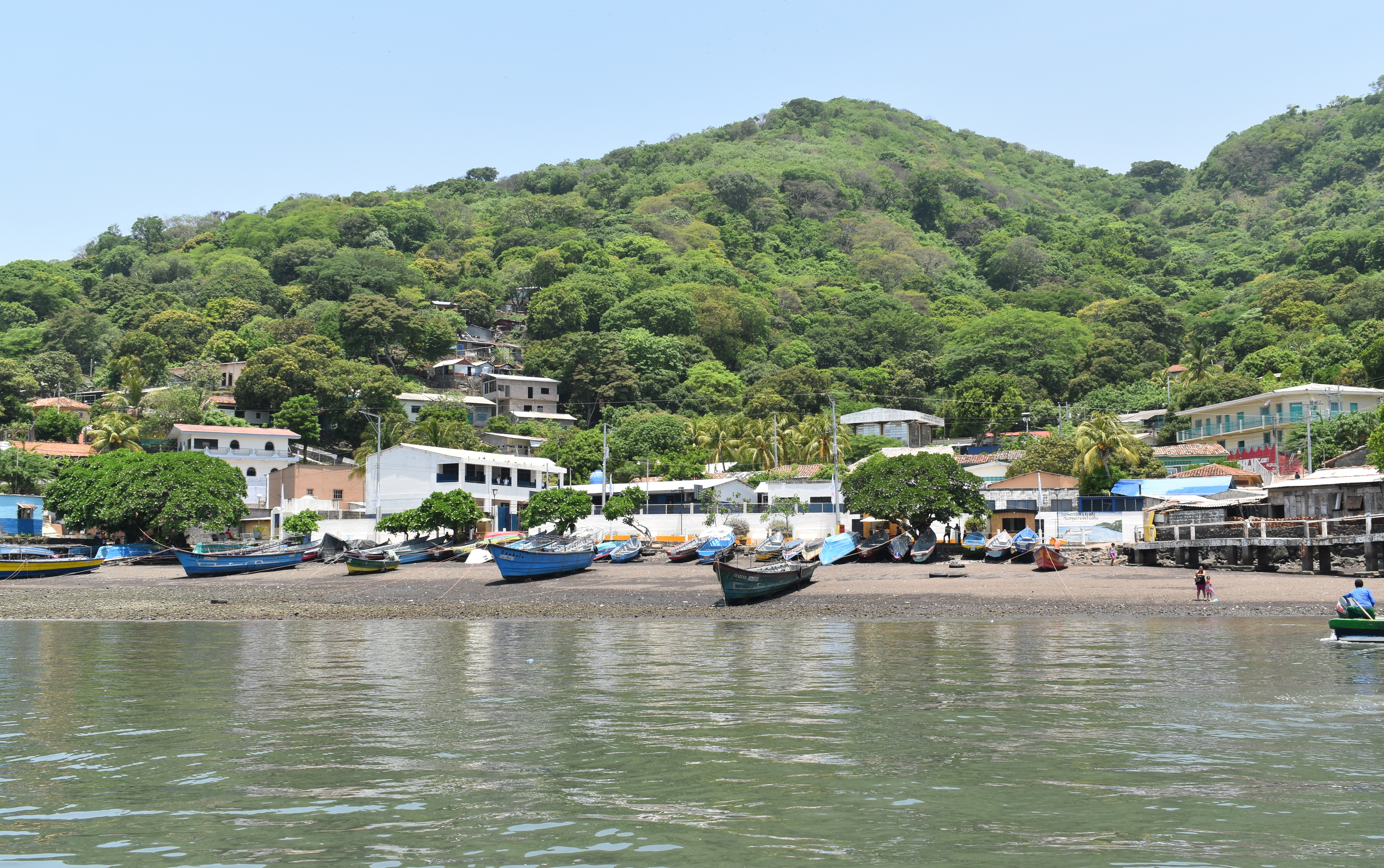
Meanguera del Golfo

Meanguera del Golfo is a municipality in the La Unión Department of El Salvador. It is located 30 kilometres (19 mi) from La Unión municipality and 213 km (132 mi) from San Salvador on the island of Meanguera in the Gulf of Fonseca. It has an area of 23.6 km^{2} (9.1 sq mi) with a population of 2,398 inhabitants (2007).

Three countries - Honduras, El Salvador, and Nicaragua - have a coastline along the gulf, and all three have been involved in a lengthy dispute over the rights to the gulf and the islands located there within. In 1992, a chamber of the International Court of Justice (ICJ) decided the Land, Island and Maritime Frontier Dispute, of which the gulf dispute was a part. The ICJ determined that the three countries were to share control of the Gulf of Fonseca. El Salvador was awarded the islands of Meanguera and Meanguerita, and Honduras was awarded El Tigre Island.
