= Cayo Sur =

Uninhabited island in the Caribbean sea

Coordinates: 15°04′N 82°30′W

- Interactive map of Cayo Sur

Geography
- Location: Caribbean

Cayo Sur (lit. 'South Cay') is a uninhabited Caribbean island less than two hectares in size, located near the border of Honduras and Nicaragua. It is one of four cays, or low-lying islands, transferred to Honduran sovereignty in 2007 after a lengthy territorial dispute that led to a court case in November 1999. Historically, the islands were used for hunting by Caymanians, and the surrounding area has an abundance of natural resources, including fish, and possibly oil and natural gas.

== Dispute and resolution ==
Along with three other islands (Bobel Cay, Savanna Cay, and Port Royal Cay) Cayo Sur had been disputed between Honduras and Nicaragua. In 1999, Nicaragua said that negotiations over the four islands had fallen apart, and the two countries were unable to reach a diplomatic settlement; as a result Nicaragua brought a case before the International Court of Justice, which culminated in a unanimous Honduran victory on 8 October 2007.

In 2000 Nicaragua accused Honduras of putting troops on the tiny island, in contravention of their bilateral agreement. The Honduran Defense Minister Edgardo Dumas denied the charge, quipping, "There's no question that we have now and have always had four cats, but there's no army.'' (Note: The Spanish word for cat is gato. The Spanish word for cay is cayo.) The presence of troops was later confirmed by Honduran Foreign Minister Roberto Flores. However, an assistant US military attaché that visited the island as an international observer, Army Major Frank Grimm, claimed there was no evidence of any troops stationed there.

Although the islands are uninhabited, fishermen from the Cayman Islands would go to the island and surrounding area to catch fish, turtles, sharks and bird eggs. There is also evidence of some Caymanians building huts there and being buried there. Despite this, neither the Cayman Islands, nor the UK, which formally controls the Cayman Islands, were a party to the ICJ case which determined the island's sovereignty.
