= San Lorenzo, Honduras =

San Lorenzo
- Municipality
- Location in Honduras
- Coordinates: 13°22′N 87°16′W
- Country: Honduras
- Department: Valle
- Villages: 9

Area
  - Total: 169 km^{2} (65 sq mi)

Population (2023 projection)
  - Total: 50,636
  - Density: 300/km^{2} (776/sq mi)
- Time zone: UTC-6 (Central America)
- Climate: Aw

San Lorenzo (Spanish pronunciation: [san loˈɾenso]) is a city, with a population of 35,560 (2023 calculation), and a municipality in the Honduran department of Valle.

The city was established by Spaniards as a village in 1522 but not granted city status until 1909. It is the primary Honduran port on the Pacific coast and lies on the Pan American Highway.

== Geography ==
San Lorenzo is located in the department of Valle. It is located at approximately 13.42 North 87.45 West. San Lorenzo is located 60 miles (2 hours) south from Tegucigalpa, the capital of Honduras, 21 miles east of the border crossing to El Salvador at El Amatillo and 50 miles west from Nicaragua. San Lorenzo is also located about 8 miles south of Jicaro Galan, Valle (located at the crossroads of the Pan American Highway and the Southern Highway). The next closest sizeable cities are Nacaome, Valle to the north and Choluteca, Choluteca which is 19 miles to the east.

According to the 2001 Honduran National Census, San Lorenzo is the 20th largest city with a population of 21,043. According to census, the population was divided between 19 colonias and barrios. It had a population of 15,294 in 1988 and 9,467 in 1974 fin.

== Demographics ==
At the time of the 2013 Honduras census, San Lorenzo municipality had a population of 41,297. Of these, 97.38% were Mestizo, 2.10% White, 0.42% Black or Afro-Honduran, 0.08% Indigenous, and 0.03% others.

== Economy ==
It has become one of the most developed cities in southern Honduras. Its economy is based around the seafood industry (shrimp), tourism and agriculture (watermelon, melon and other fruits).

The city has one public market, six banks, one cooperative and many restaurants located in La Cabaña, the tourist area. The modern public market was built by the Spaniards c. 2005. The largest hotels include El Gran Hotel Miramar, Hotel Club Morazán and Villas Concha Mar Condominiums.

== Culture ==
The patron saint celebration takes place in August. A local seafood soup is called Sopa Marinera. Many tourists visit the area, including Europeans sailing in the Gulf of Fonseca.

A small city park has several concrete marine animals including a shrimp, shark, crab and a pelican for children to play on. A new park was built in late 2007. It is located near La Cabaña and the Miramar Hotel. It includes a monument dedicated to present and past mariners including those that once worked in pangones, transporting wood and other articles from Amapala.

== Transportation ==
Most streets are paved. An abandoned 4,400 airstrip with an elevation of 26 feet above sea level can be found northwest of the city center. However, the closest airport with scheduled flights is Toncontin International Airport (MHTG) in Tegucigalpa. Puerto de Henecan opened in 1979, which replaced the port at Amapala.
