= Utila =

Smallest of Islas de la Bahía, Honduras

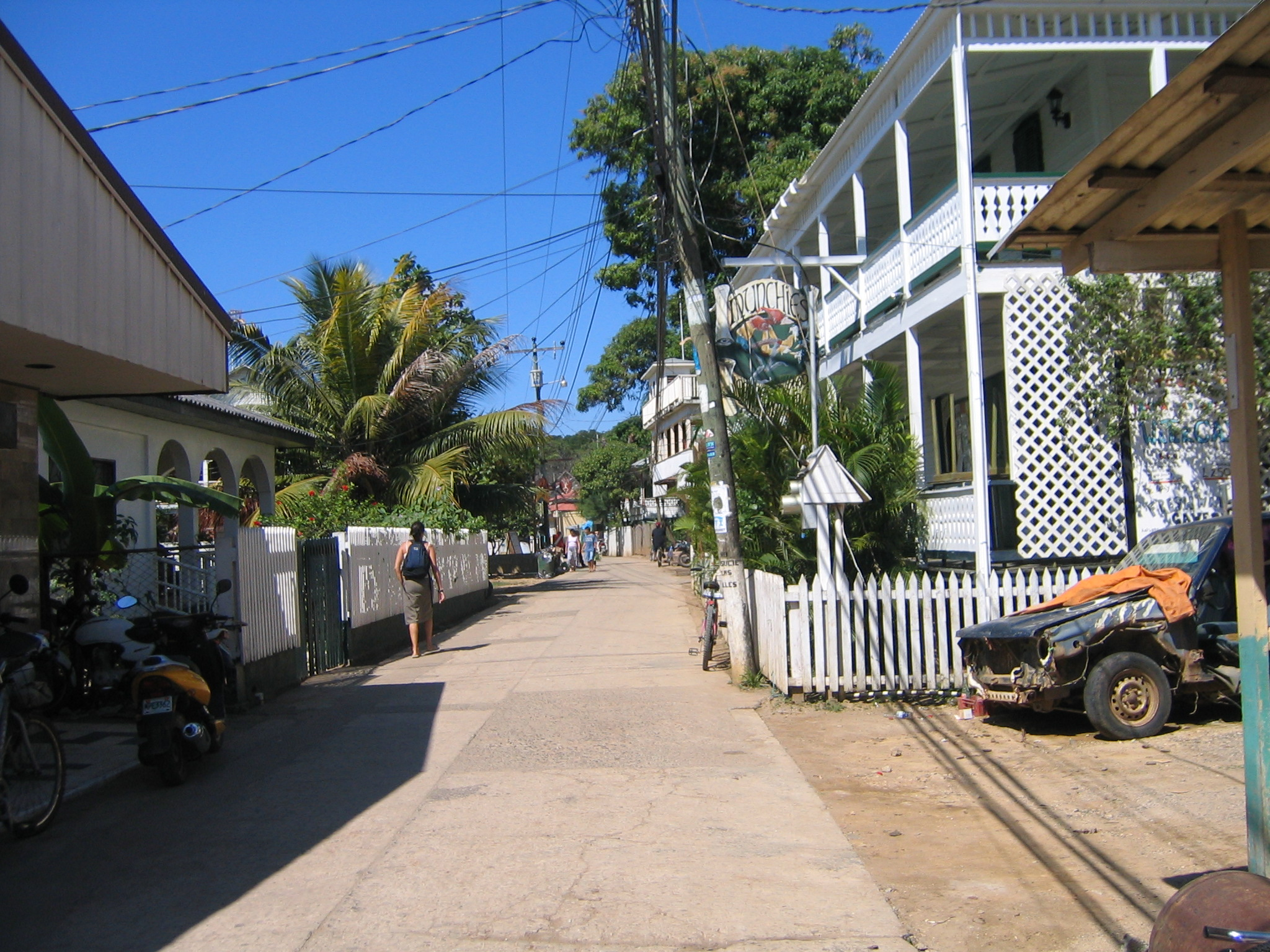
- Typical road near the Munchies Restaurant, a historic building

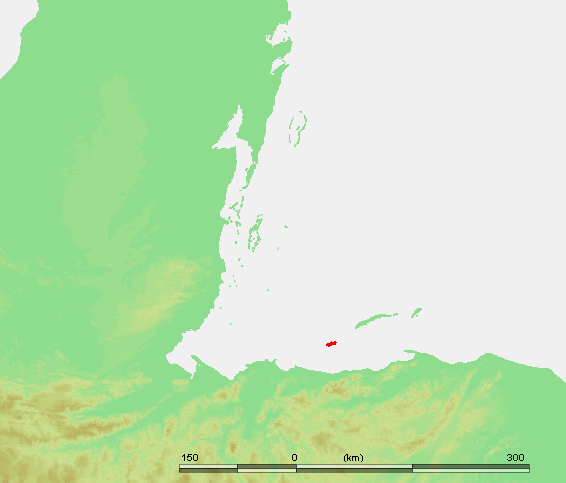

- Location within Honduras Location within the Caribbean

Geography
- Location: Caribbean Sea
- Coordinates: 16°06′N 86°56′W
- Archipelago: Bay Islands
- Area: 45 km^{2} (17 sq mi)
- Highest elevation: 74 m (243 ft)

Administration
- Honduras
- Department: Islas de la Bahía

Demographics
- Population: 5215 (2023 estimate)
- Isla de Utila Lighthouse
- Foundation: piles
- Construction: concrete mast
- Height: 15 m (49 ft)
- Shape: square prism mast
- Markings: red mast with horizontal white band
- Power source: solar power
- Focal height: 15 m (49 ft)
- Range: 4 nmi (7.4 km; 4.6 mi)
- Characteristic: F W

Ramsar Wetland
- Official name: Sistema de Humedales de la Isla de Utila
- Designated: 2 February 2013
- Reference no.: 2134

Utila (Spanish: Isla de Utila) is the smallest of Honduras' major Bay Islands, after Roatán and Guanaja, in a region that marks the south end of the Mesoamerican Barrier Reef System, the second-largest in the world. It has been documented in history since Columbus' fourth voyage.

== Geography ==
The eastern end of the island is capped by a thin veneer of basaltic volcanic rocks, erupted from several pyroclastic cones including 74 m (243 ft) Pumpkin Hill which forms the highest point on the island.

=== Demographics ===
The people of Utila are of Afro-Indigenous (Garífuna), English and Dutch descent. At the time of the 2013 Honduras census, Utila municipality had a population of 3,947. Of these, 82.32% were Mestizo, 13.42% White, 2.10% Black or Afro-Honduran, 0.26% Indigenous and 1.91% others.

=== Environment ===
The island is part of the Islas de la Bahía y Cayos Cochinos Important Bird Area (IBA), designated as such by BirdLife International because it supports significant populations of white-crowned pigeons, chimney swifts and yellow-naped amazons. Since 2013 the entire island and its cays have been designated as a protected Ramsar site. Popular cays include Water Cay, Pigeon Cay and Sandy Cay.

Ecologically, the island's coastal mangrove forests serve as the exclusive critical habitat for the critically endangered Utila spiny-tailed iguana (Ctenosaura bakeri), while surrounding shallow seagrass beds support essential nursery environments for regional marine fauna.

== History ==
=== Prehistory ===
Archeological, historical and ethnographic evidence of the Bay Islands indicates that they were inhabited before the European's arrival in 600 AD by a pre-Columbian culture known as the Paya and now known as Pech. The Paya people may have entered Central America in the great North to South America migration in 5,000 BC, although linguistic studies indicate that the Paya may have been descendants of South American tribes.

=== 16th to 18th centuries ===
Christopher Columbus, on his fourth voyage to the new world, landed on the island of Guanaja on 30 July 1502, after encountering a small fleet of dugout canoes destined from the mainland to the Bay Islands. These vessels were filled with cotton cloth, maize, cacao, beans, copper goods and wooden swords with sharp flint edges, and on this meeting one dugout canoe carrying 25 men, women and children was captured. On land, Columbus encountered a fairly large population of Paya whom he believed to be cannibals. In 1516, licensed slavers were sent to the Islands under the authority of Diego Velázquez de Cuéllar and captured 300, killing others who put up resistance. The slaving vessel returned to Havana harbour, Santiago de Cuba, where it was taken over by the Paya who demanded repatriation. On hearing that the Paya had been repatriated, Velasquez commissioned two ships back which then captured 400 Paya on Utila and on one of the other islands, and during this raid 100 Paya were reported to have been killed. After their capture, this and future shipments of Paya slaves were forced to work in mines, farm sugar cane plantations and tend livestock on Santiago de Cuba, and were also sent to work in the gold and silver mines of Mexico.

Colonisation by the Spanish began in the early 16th century. Over the next century, the Spanish plundered the island for its slave trade and eliminated the island of its natives by the early 17th century. Britain, in its aggressive attempt to out-colonize the Spanish in the Caribbean, occupied the Bay Islands on and off between 1550 and 1700. During this time, the buccaneers found the vacated, mostly unprotected islands a haven for safe harbour and transport. Utila is rich in pirate lore, and even presently, scuba divers look for sunken treasure from Captain Morgan's lost booty from his raid on Panama in 1671.

=== 19th century ===
The British were forced to give the Bay Islands to the Honduran government in the mid 19th century. It was at this time that the nearly uninhabited islands were being populated by its now Caymanian roots. They remain rich in Caymanian culture and dialect.

=== Pirate havens ===
Utila has been a part of Honduras for approximately 150 years. For nearly 200 years Spanish conquistadores and British pirates battled for control of these islands, ignoring the native people for the most part. During this period, the Islands were used for food and wood supplies, safe harbour, and slave trading. Remains of British forts and towns named after famous pirates remain as their legacy.

=== Black Caribs ===
Making a significant impact on Utila's cultural base were the Black Caribs, who originated as the Callinagu in the Orinoco Delta in Brazil. Migrating north to the Lower Antilles the Callinagu subsequently exterminated the Arahuaco men, but kept and bred with their women creating a new ethnic subgroup that became known as the Caliponan, or Yellow Caribs. In 1635 African slaves who had been shipwrecked by their own devices began to marry the Caliponan women, adopting their language and culture so as to assimilate locally and thwart their owners attempts to retrieve them. Thus the Garífuna society was born. On 12 April 1797, a total of 2,248 Garifunas were sent to Honduras and the Bay Islands in an attempt by the English to restrain the Garifuna from assisting the French in the English/French dispute over the islands of Martinique, and Saint Lucia. Scattered on the north coast of Honduras and in the Bay Islands, the Garífuna still populate much of the Bay Islands, maintaining their own cultural identity and language. On Roatan the Garifuna maintain a strong presence in the Sandy Bay community, on the westernmost side of East Harbor, a number of them having made the journey to Utila from Cayo Chachahuate, a small nearby island that is a bastion of the Bay Island's Garífuna.

== Tourism ==
With favorable diving conditions, the island increasingly attracts general tourists, along with more traditional international backpacker visitors. More than eighty diving sites are located around the island among its extensive reefs teeming with marine life, including the elusive whale shark. The many dive sites of Utila has secured the island on the list of 100 Places to Dive Before you Die.

Utila was also the home of the annual festival Sunjam. Sunjam was the largest electronic music event in Honduras, and one of the largest and most important in Central America. The date was fixed to the first Saturday of August every year. The event attracted world class international DJs as headliners and invites the best regional talent to perform.

Unique local cuisine includes white bread made with coconut milk, mango jam, conch meat, and crab. Other common dishes on Utila include Sopa de Caracol (a coconut based conch soup), fried whole fish, as well as fried hog.

The island is served by Utila Airport, and connects to all of Honduras's international larger airports.

== Image gallery ==
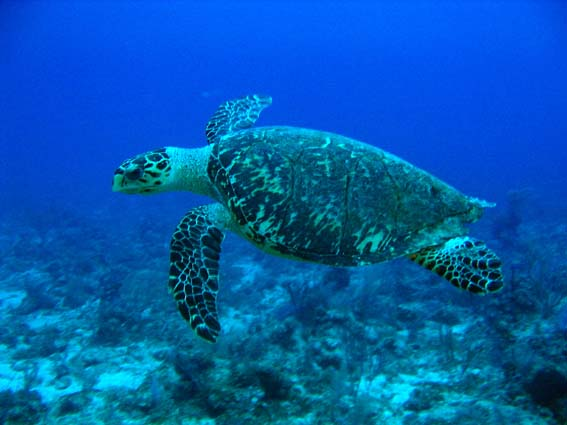
Hawksbill turtle at the "Black Hills" dive site

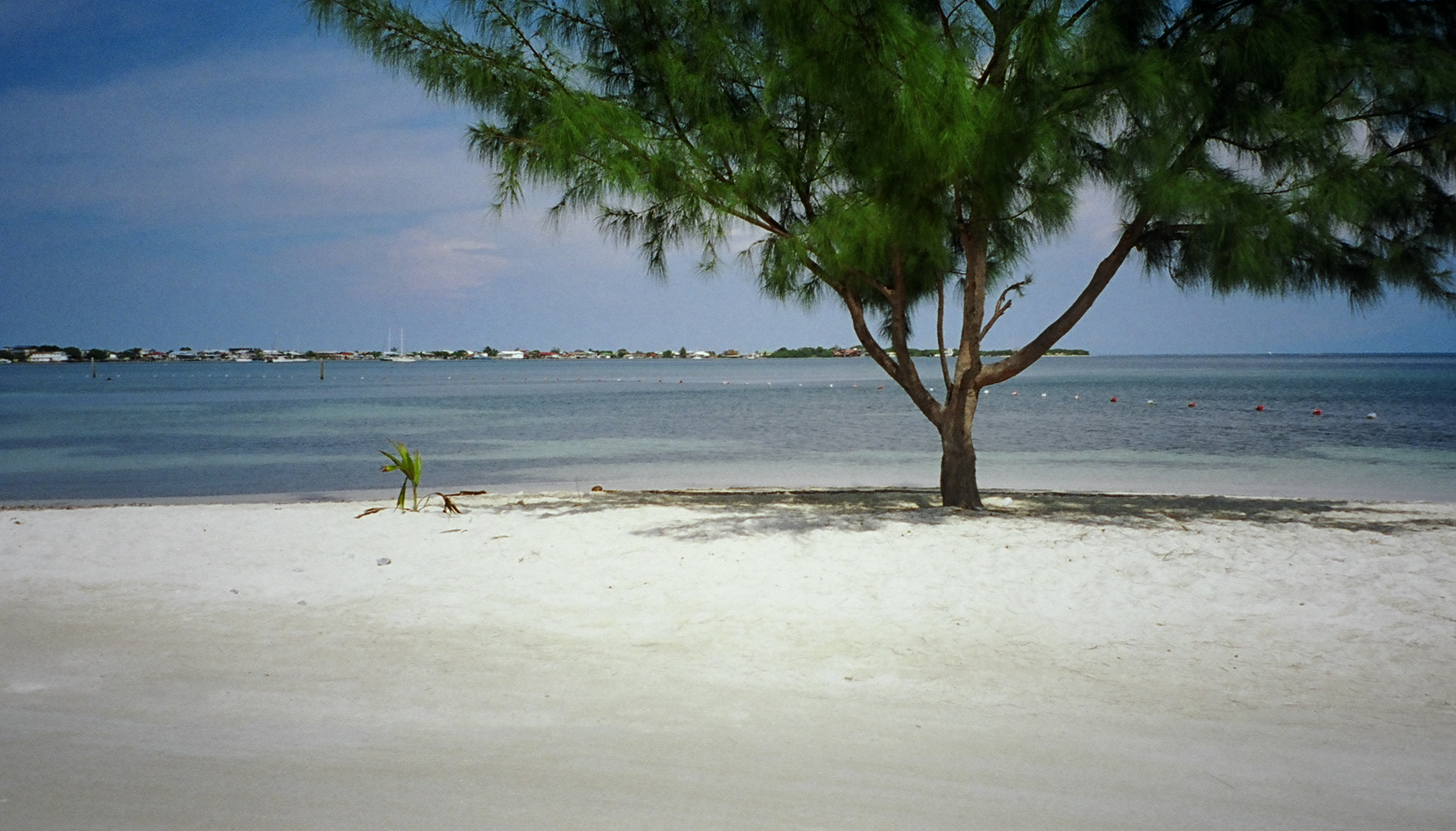
The ever calm waters at the public beach

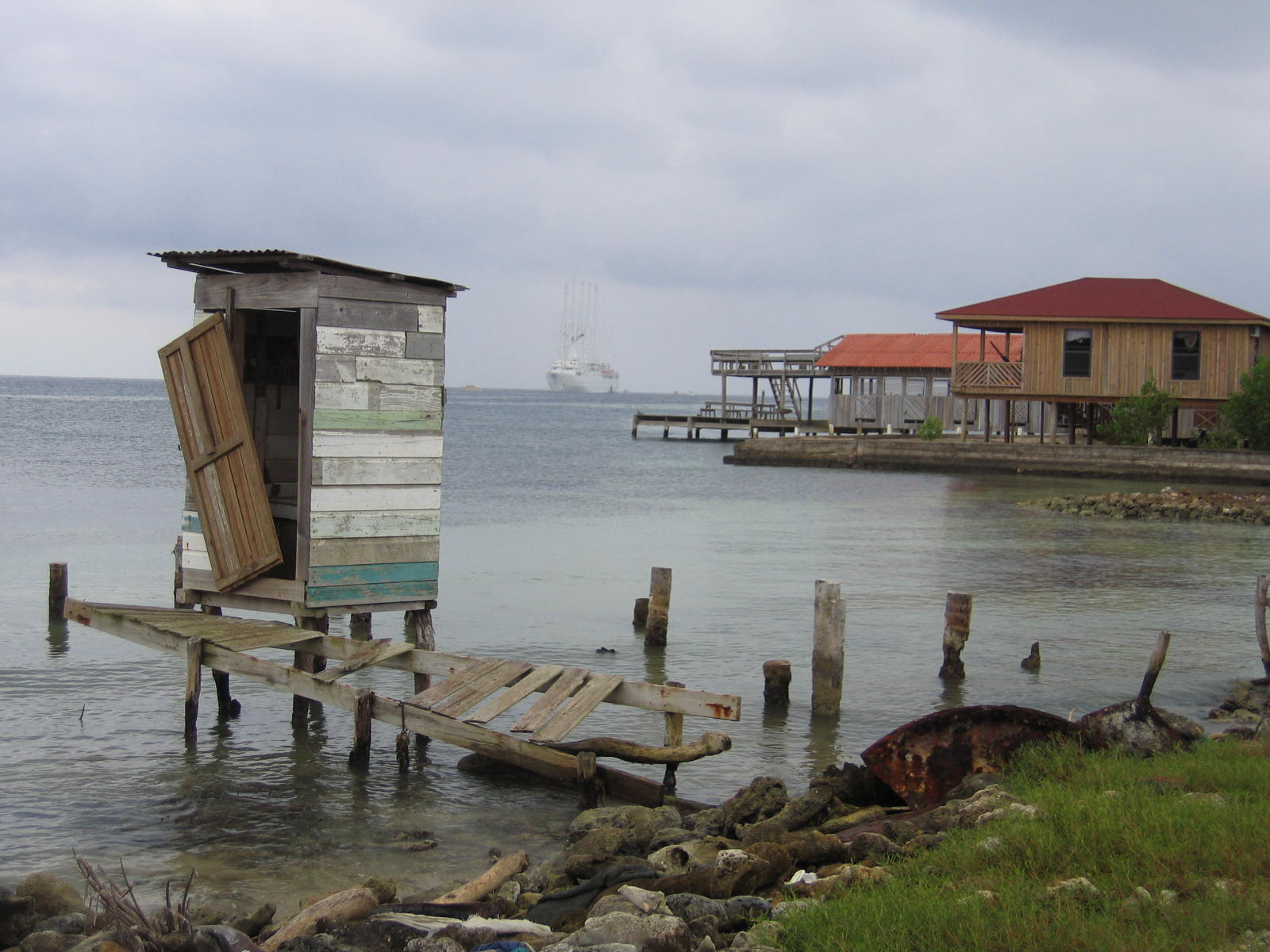
The outhouse over the water stands on the bay.

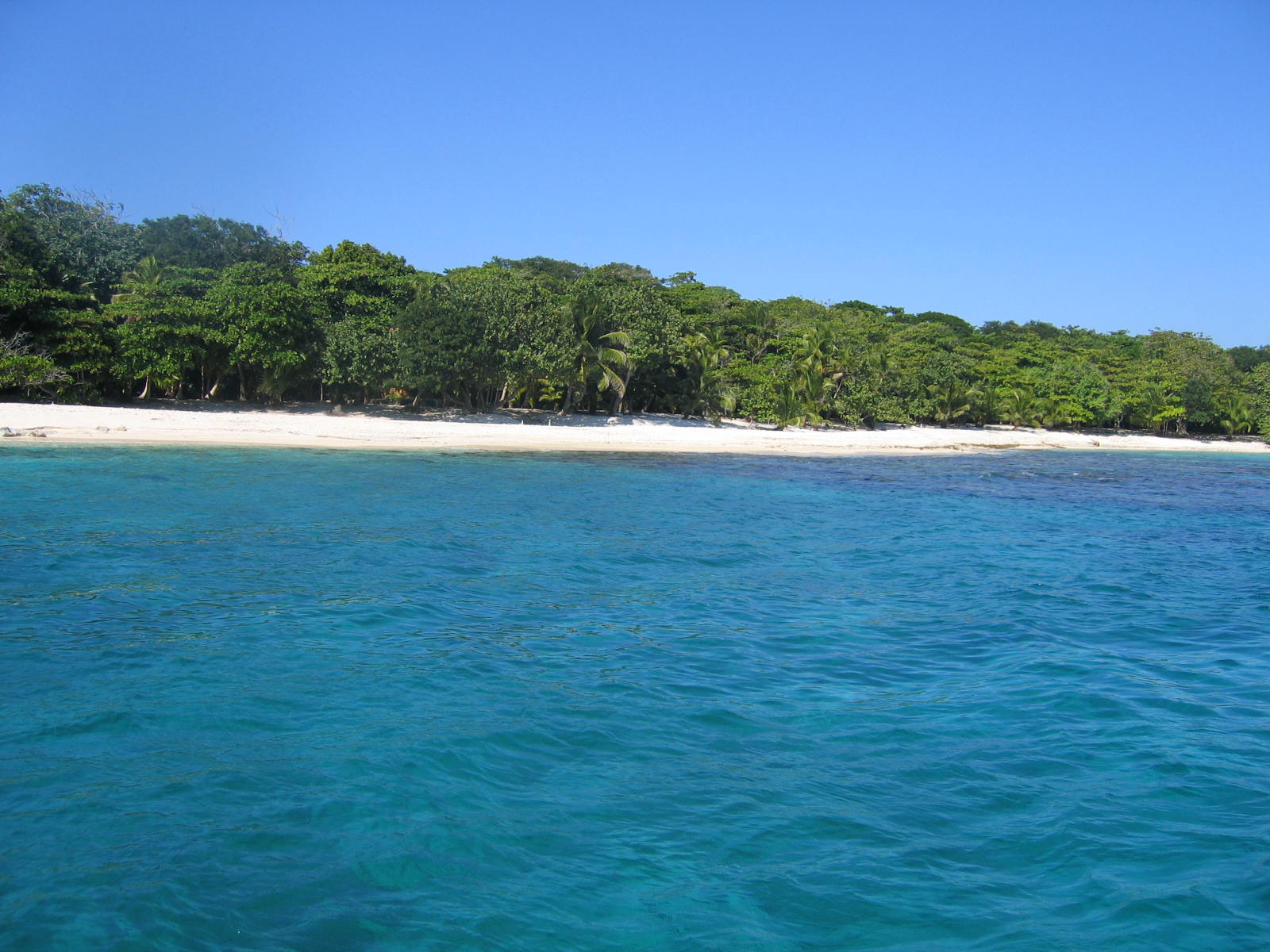
"Big Rock Beach"

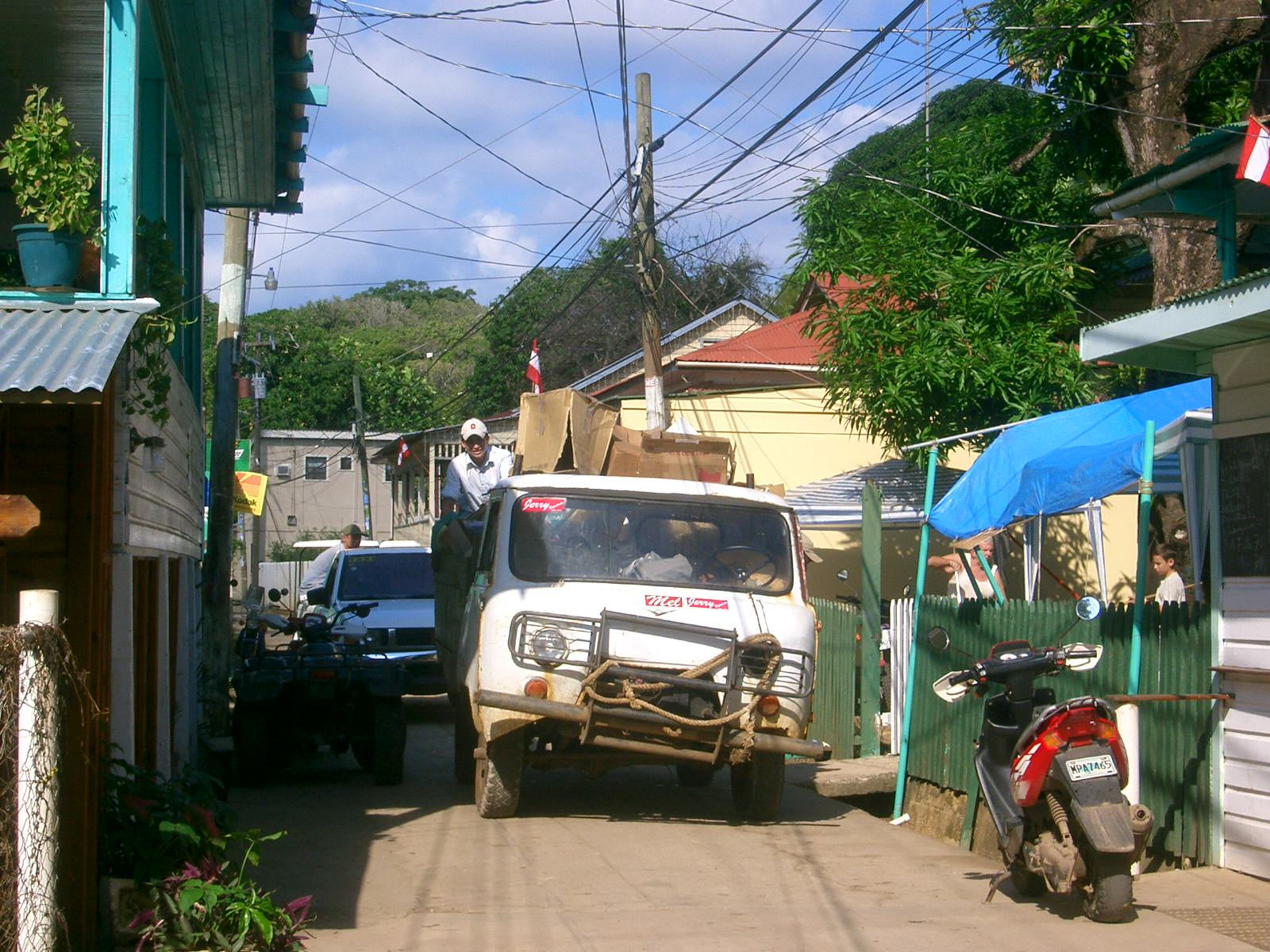
Typical traffic jam, there are only a handful of old pick-up trucks on the entire island

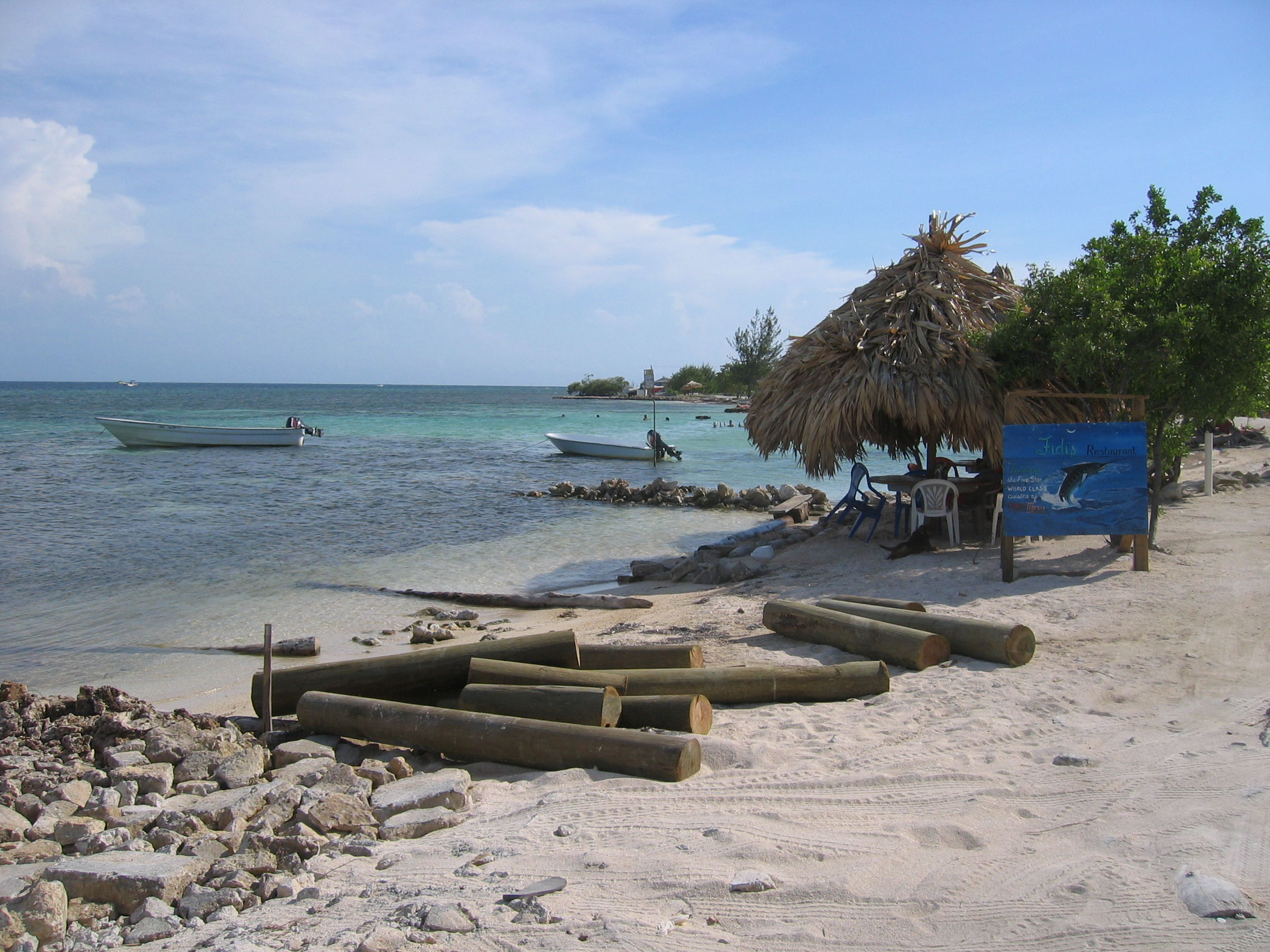
The main beach

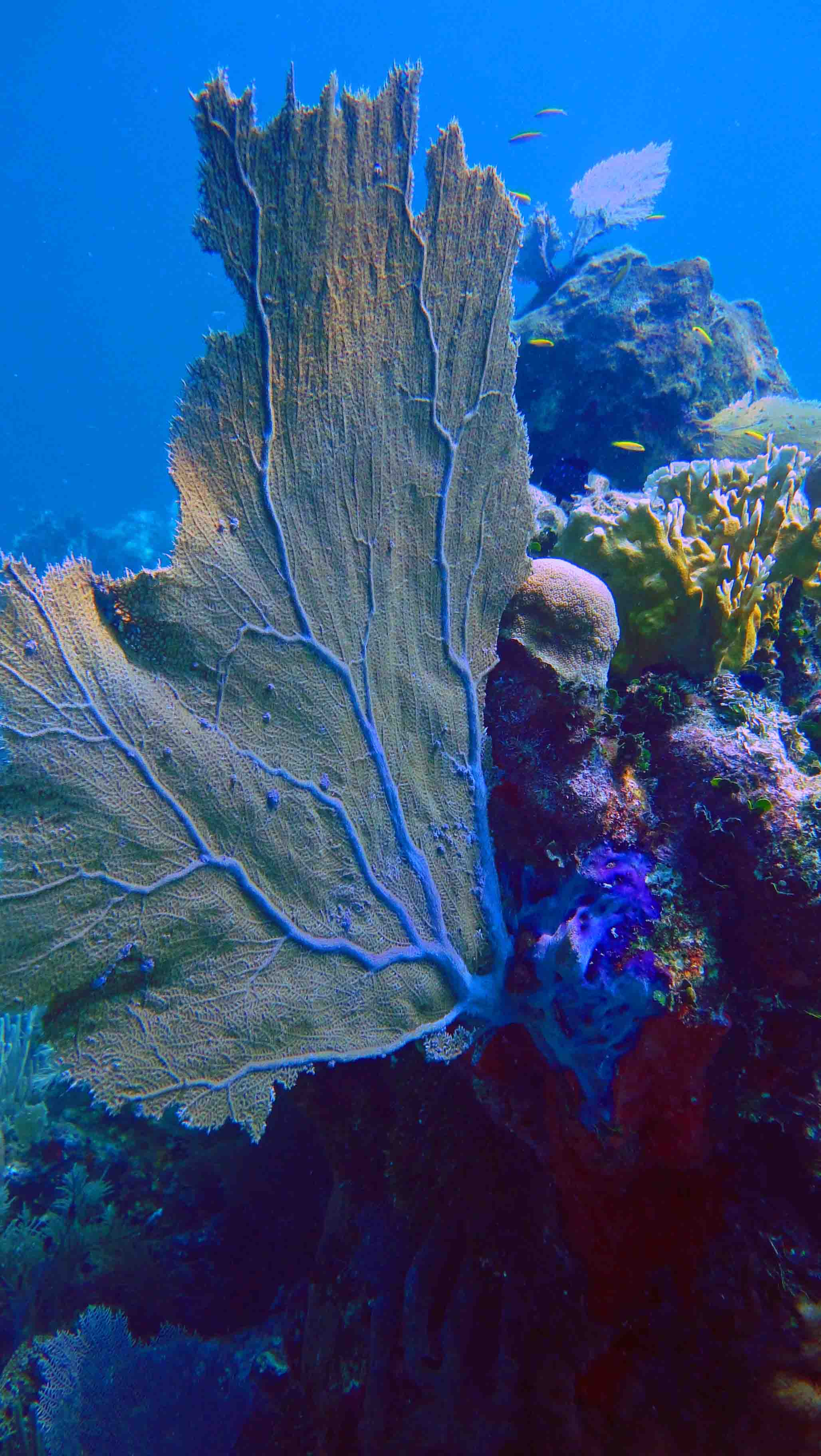
Coral surrounds the island.

== See also ==
- List of lighthouses in Honduras
- List of volcanoes in Honduras
