= Isla Zacate Grande =

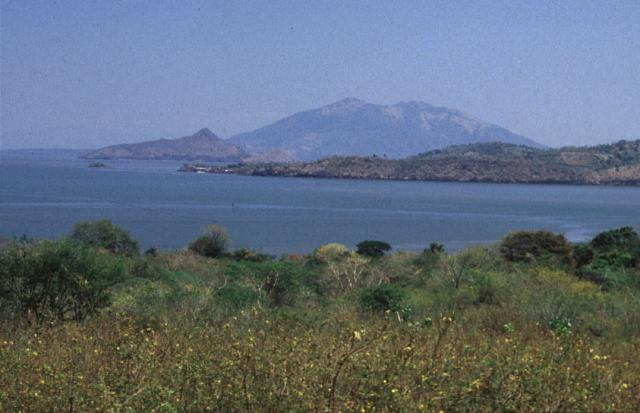
- Zacate Grande

Highest point
- Elevation: 640 m (2,100 ft)
- Prominence: 640 m (2,100 ft)
- Coordinates: 13.336°N 87.628°W

Geography
- Location: Gulf of Fonseca, Honduras
- Parent range: Central America Volcanic Arc

Geology
- Rock age: Holocene
- Mountain type: Stratovolcano (extinct)
- Volcanic arc: Central America Volcanic Arc

Isla Zacate Grande is a stratovolcano in Honduras. The volcano forms a 7 by 10 km (4 by 6 mi) island in the Gulf of Fonseca and has seven satellite cones, including Guegensi Island located 3 km (2 mi) from Zacate Grande. The island has seven of the 13 Aldeas (known as towns or neighborhoods) son of the city Amapala. These are subdivided into hamlets.
