= Goascorán =

- Municipality
- Location in Honduras
- Coordinates: 13°35′N 87°37′W
- Country: Honduras
- Department: Valle

Area
  - Total: 191.1 km^{2} (73.8 sq mi)

Population (2013)
  - Total: 14,342
  - Density: 75.05/km^{2} (194.4/sq mi)

Goascorán is a municipality in the department of Valle in Honduras. It covers an area of 191.1 km^{2} (73.8 sq mi) and had a population of 14,342 inhabitants according to the 2013 census.

== Etymology ==
Goascorán might have been derived from the indigenous Uaxcayan language, which means "houses of Guajes", where Guajes refers to native plant species. It might also have been derived from the "Guas" bird, which might refer to the raptors nesting along the Gulf of Fonseca in the region.

== History ==
The settlement was initially established in 1686 at "Playa Grande del Guayabal". Due to pirate attacks, the town was shifted to a new location called San Jerónimo. However, as the pirate attacks continued, the inhabitatns moved further inland to the current location. It part of Comayagua Department during the political division of 1825. It was part of a land dispute with the neighboring El Salvador, which was settled by the International Court of Justice in 1991.

== Geography ==
Goascorán is located in the department of Valle in Honduras. It shares international border with El Salvador, demarcated by the Goascorán River. The municipality covers an area of 191.1 km^{2} (73.8 sq mi).

Goascorán has a tropical monsoon climate (Köppen climate classification: Am). The municipality has an average annual temperature of 30.55 °C (86.99 °F) and typically receives about 198.96 mm (7.833 in) of annual precipitation.

== Administrative divisions ==
The municipality comprises eight aldeas (villages) and their associated caseríos (hamlets).

Aldeas of Goascorán
Aldea	Total Population	Men	Women
Goascorán	2,663	1,220	1,443
El Picacho	1,418	732	686
La Arada	4,037	1,939	2,098
Llano de Jesús	1,152	573	579
Piedras Blancas	1,324	621	703
San Andrés	2,367	1,126	1,241
Santa Inés	963	466	497
Santa Rita	418	190	228
Total	14,342	6,868	7,474

== Demographics ==
According to the 2013 census, Goascorán had a total population of 14,342 inhabitants, of whom 6,868 (47.9%) were men and 7,474 (52.1%) were women. About 11% of the population was classified as urban and 12,759 residents (89.0%) lived in the rural areas.

By broad age group, 4,607 individuals (32.1%) were aged 0–14 years, 8,549 individuals (59.6%) were aged 15–64, and 1,186 individuals (8.3%) were aged 65 years and over. The median age was 23.0 years and the mean age was 28.5 years. Among the population aged 15 and over, the municipality recorded an illiteracy rate of 16.0%, lower than the departmental average of 17.7%. The municipality had 3,410 occupied private dwellings, with an average of 4.1 persons per occupied dwelling.
