= Goascorán River =

River in Honduras and El salvador

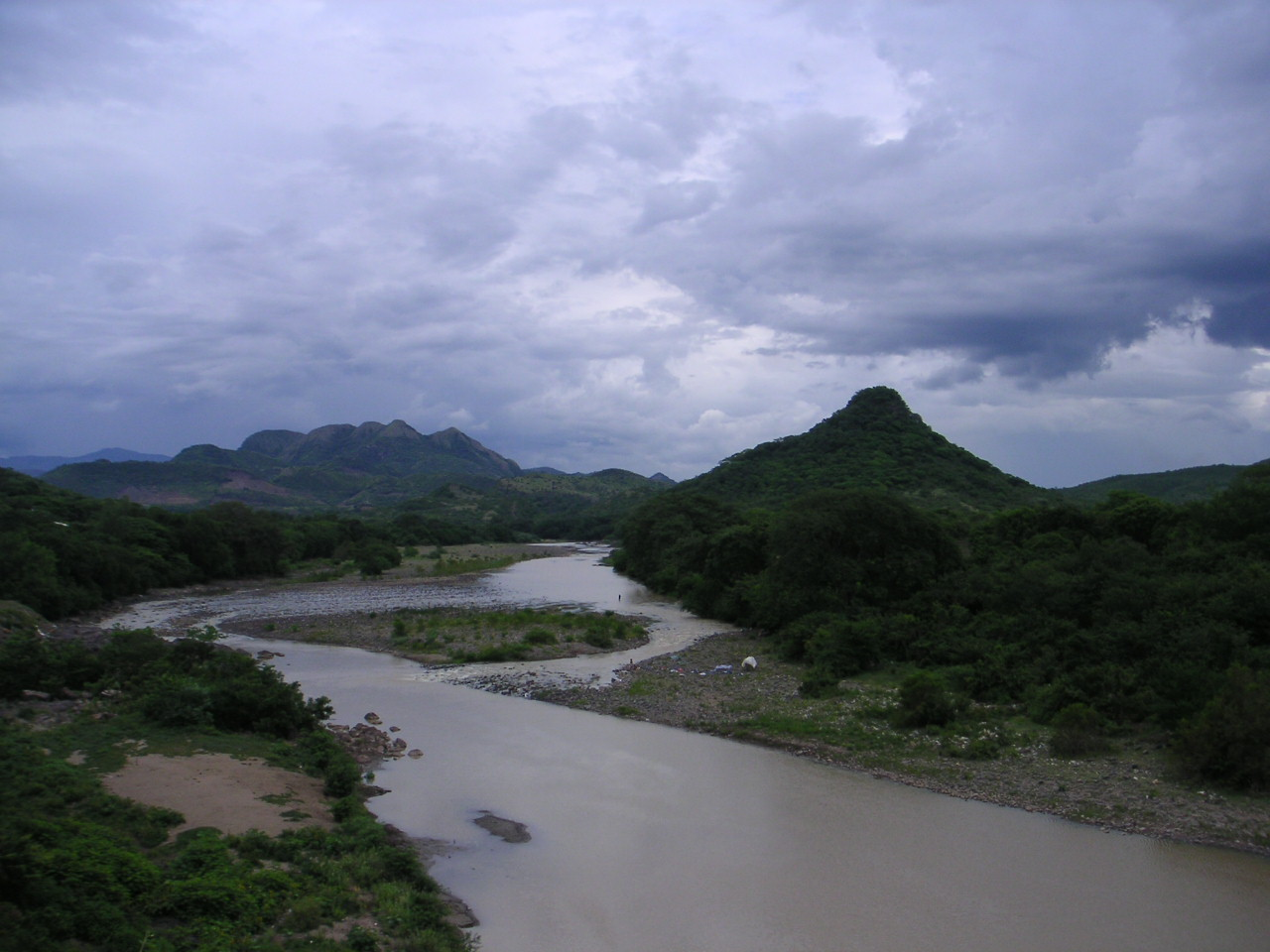
- Goascarán river on the Salvadoran border
- Native name: Río Goascorán (Spanish)

Location
- Countries: Honduras; El Salvador

Physical characteristics
- Source
  - location: La Paz (Honduras), Honduras
- Mouth: Pacific Ocean
  - location: El Salvador, Honduras
  - coordinates: 13°24′38″N 87°49′08″W
  - elevation: 0 m (0 ft)
- Length: 130 km (81 mi)
- Basin size: 2,081 km^{2} (803 sq mi)

The Goascorán River or Río Goascorán is a river in Central America. It rises in the La Sierra mountain ridge in Honduras and flows southward along the El Salvador-Honduras border for about 75 miles (120 km). It courses past Goascorán city to La Unión Bay, an inlet of the Gulf of Fonseca.
