= Curarén =

- Municipality
- Location in Honduras
- Coordinates: 13°51′N 87°32′W
- Country: Honduras
- Department: Francisco Morazán

Area
  - Total: 312 km^{2} (120 sq mi)

Population
  - Total: 20,634
  - Density: 66.1/km^{2} (171/sq mi)
- Climate: Aw

Curarén is a municipality in the Honduran department of Francisco Morazán.
