= Bobel Cay =

Island in Honduras

Coordinates: 15°04′53″N 82°40′31″W

Bobel Cay is an island in Honduras, located around 500km off the east coast of the South American continent.

== Location ==
Bobel Cay is of the most southerly islands under Honduras’ jurisdiction, and the cay is located close to the border of Nicaragua and Honduras. In 2007, the International Court of Justice rules that Bobel Cay and three other islands were within the lawful jurisdiction of Honduras.
