= Valle Department =

Valle Department Departamento de Valle
- Department
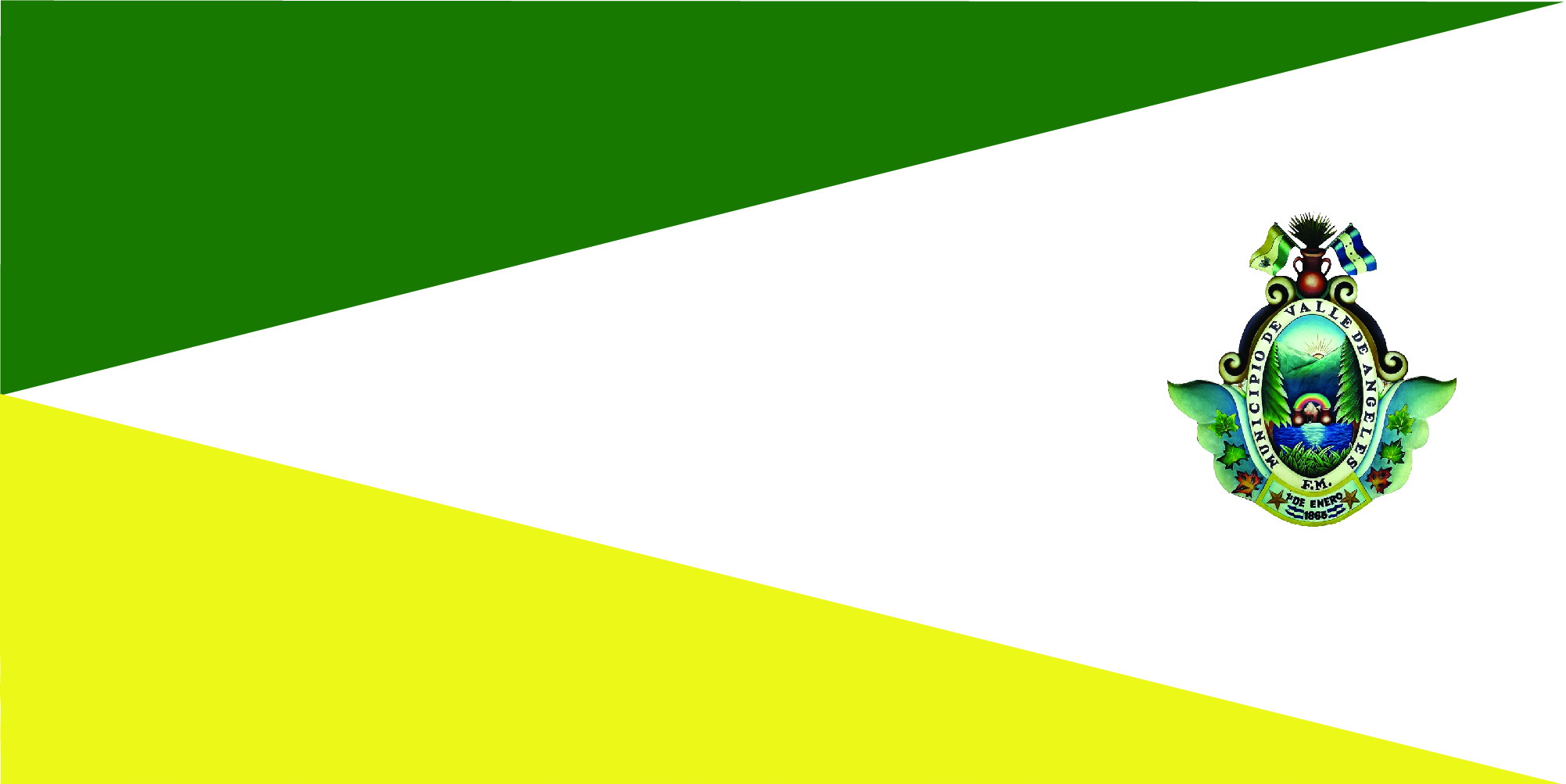
- Flag

- Location of Valle in Honduras
- Coordinates: 13°32′N 87°29′W
- Country: Honduras
- Municipalities: 9
- Villages: 86
- Founded: 11 July 1893
- Capital city: Nacaome

Government
  - Type: Departmental
  - Governor: Gonzalo Posadas (2022-2026) (LibRe)

Area
  - Total: 1,618 km^{2} (625 sq mi)

Population (2015)
  - Total: 178,561
  - Density: 110.4/km^{2} (285.8/sq mi)

GDP (Nominal, 2015 US dollar)
  - Total: $400 million (2023)
  - Per capita: $2,000 (2023)

GDP (PPP, 2015 int. dollar)
  - Total: $900 million (2023)
  - Per capita: $4,200 (2023)
- Time zone: UTC-6 (CDT)
- Postal code: 52101
- ISO 3166 code: HN-VA
- HDI (2021): 0.589 medium · 10th of 18
- Statistics derived from Consult INE online database: Population and Housing Census 2013

Valle is one of the 18 departments into which Honduras is divided.

The departmental capital is Nacaome. The department faces the Gulf of Fonseca and contains mangrove swamps; inland, it is very hot and dry.

The department covers a total surface area of 1,665 km^{2} and, in 2015, had an estimated population of 178,561 people.

Valle Department was organized in 1893.

== Municipalities ==
1. Alianza
2. Amapala
3. Aramecina
4. Caridad
5. Goascorán
6. Langue
7. Nacaome
8. San Francisco de Coray
9. San Lorenzo
