= Gulf of Fonseca =

Gulf of the Pacific Ocean in El Salvador, Honduras, and Nicaragua

Coordinates: 13°15′N 87°45′W

- Golfo de Fonseca (Spanish)
- Location within Central America
- Type: Gulf
- Primary outflows: Pacific Ocean
- Basin countries: El Salvador; Honduras; Nicaragua
- Surface area: 3,200 mi^{2} (8,300 km^{2})

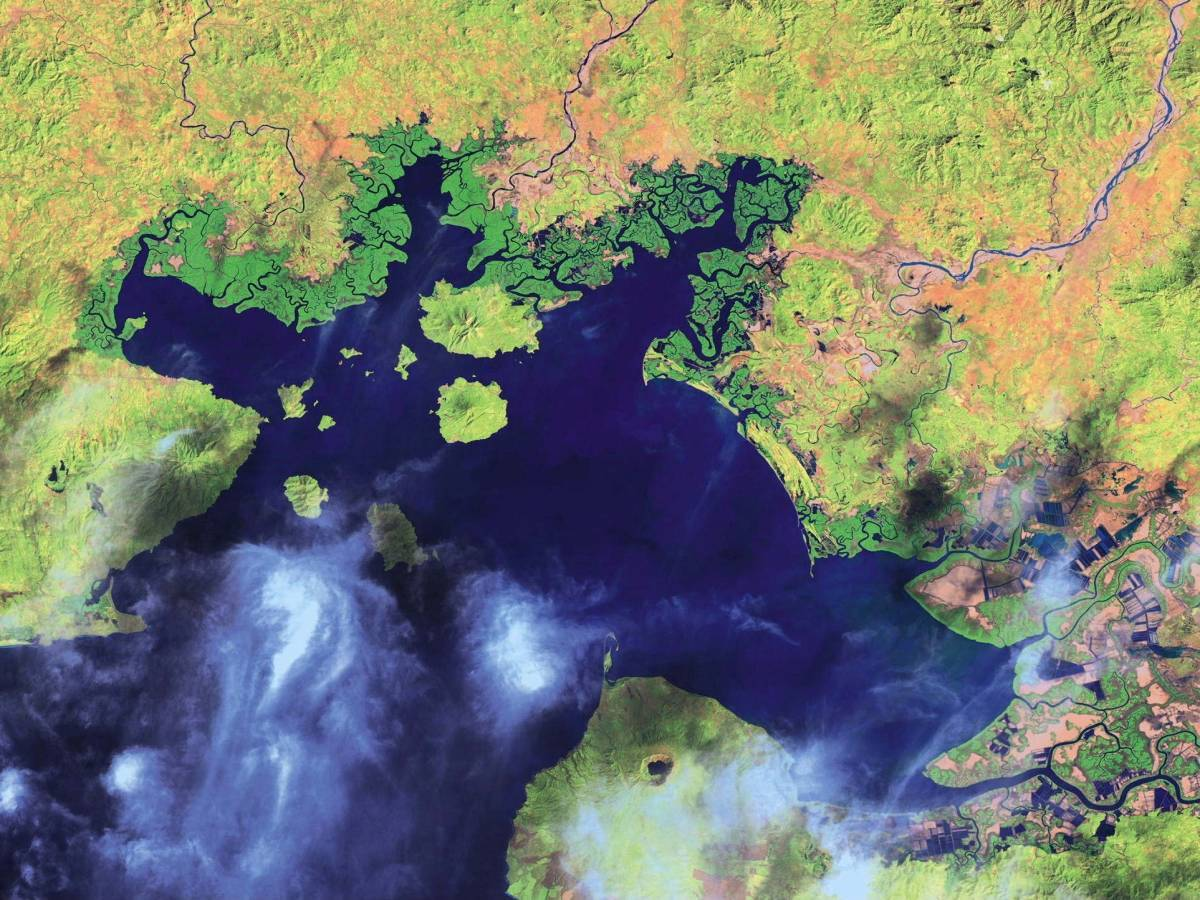
Gulf of Fonseca Satellite Image, National Oceanic and Atmospheric Administration 2001

The Gulf of Fonseca (Spanish: Golfo de Fonseca; pronounced [ˈɡol.fo ðe fonˈse.ka]), a part of the Pacific Ocean, is a gulf in Central America, bordering El Salvador, Honduras, and Nicaragua. The waters of the gulf are shared among all three countries.

== History ==
Fonseca Bay was discovered by Europeans in 1522 by Gil González de Ávila, and named by him after his patron, Archbishop Juan Fonseca, the implacable enemy of Columbus.

In 1849, E. G. Squier negotiated a treaty for the United States to build a canal across Honduras from the Caribbean Sea to the Gulf. Frederick Chatfield, the British commander in Central America, was afraid the American presence in Honduras would destabilize the British Mosquito Coast, and sent his fleet to occupy El Tigre Island at the entrance to the Gulf. Shortly thereafter, however, Squier demanded the British leave, since he had anticipated the occupation and negotiated the island's temporary cession to the United States. Chatfield could only comply.

All three countries—Honduras, El Salvador, and Nicaragua—with coastline along the Gulf have been involved in a lengthy dispute over the rights to the Gulf and the islands located within.

In 1917, the Central American Court of Justice ruled in a trial which became known as the Fonseca case. It arose out of a controversy between El Salvador and Nicaragua. The latter had entered the Bryan–Chamorro Treaty which granted a portion of the bay to the United States for the establishment of a naval base. El Salvador argued that this violated its right to common ownership in the bay. The court sided with El Salvador, but the US decided to ignore the decision.

International tensions over the Gulf were addressed by the United Nations ONUCA mission, starting in 1989 which included specific reference to the Gulf. For example, because the nature of the terrain in the region would have limited the efficacy of static observation posts, it was judged that the best results would be achieved by establishing mobile teams of observers, who would carry out regular patrols by road, by helicopter and, in the Gulf of Fonseca and nearby waters, by patrol boats and speedboats.

In 1992, a chamber of the International Court of Justice (ICJ) decided the Land, Island and Maritime Frontier Dispute, of which the Gulf dispute was a part. The ICJ determined that El Salvador, Honduras, and Nicaragua were to share control of the Gulf of Fonseca. El Salvador was awarded the islands of Meanguera and Meanguerita, while Honduras was awarded El Tigre Island.

== Physical geography ==
The Gulf of Fonseca covers an area of about 3,200 km^{2} (1,200 sq mi), with a coastline that extends for 261 km (162 mi), of which 185 km (115 mi) are in Honduras, 40 km (25 mi) in Nicaragua, and 29 km (18 mi) in El Salvador.

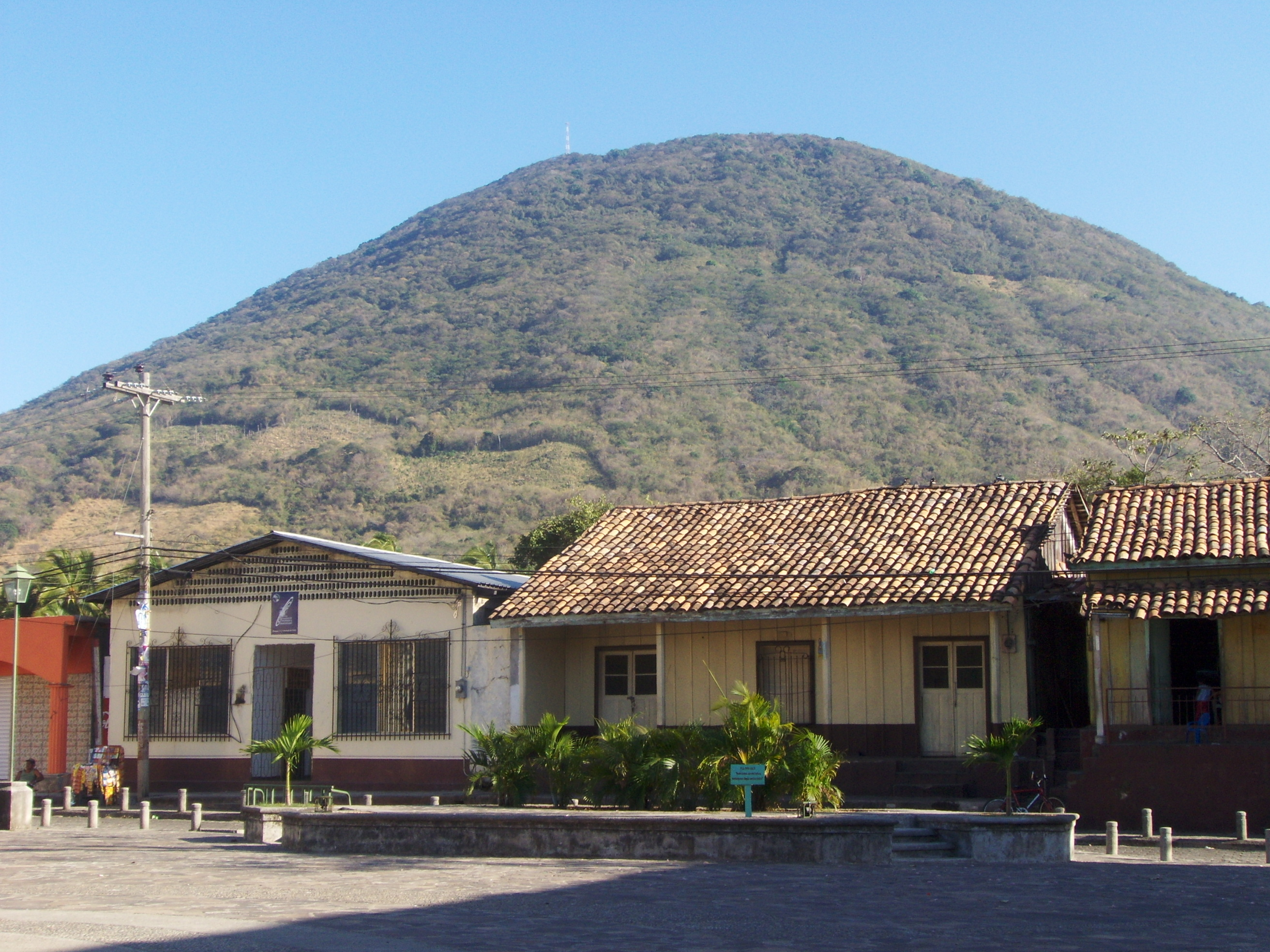
The gulf is composed by a group of many volcanic islands, such as Zacate Grande and el Tigre in Honduras.

The climate in the Gulf is typical of tropical and subtropical regions, with two distinct seasons, the rainy and the dry. The Gulf receives nearly 80% of its total yearly rainfall of 1,400–1,600 mm (55–63 in) during the rainy season from May to November. The dry season occurs between December and May and contributes to an annual evaporation rate of 2,800 mm (110 in). As a result of less water flowing into the Gulf, the currents tend to flow inward from the Pacific Ocean, and levels of salinity in the estuaries increase, and seasonal drought occurs.

Temperatures in the Gulf average between 25 and 30 °C (77–86 °F); March and April are the warmest months and November and December the coolest. Relative humidity varies between 65 and 86% depending on location. In contrast, the interior of the country is semitropical and cooler with an average temperature of 26 °C (79 °F).

The vegetation of the wetland ecosystem is dominated by species of mangroves. Of the six species of mangrove identified in the Gulf, red mangrove (Rhizophora mangle) is the most common, mostly occupying the areas permanently inundated by the tides. Black mangrove (Avicennia germinans) is the second-most pervasive species and is generally found around the rivers where sediments are deposited along the shoreline. White mangrove (Laguncularia racemosa) is the third-most dominant, followed by botoncillo (Conocarpus erectus); both are generally found further inland and are inundated by the tide less frequently. The dominance of different species over others correlates with the frequency of floods, water quality, and levels of salinity.

The amplitude of tides is 2.3 m (7.5 ft) on average per day in the Gulf. During low tides, the soils are inhabited by crabs, conch, and other species. During the high tide, the mangrove forests serve as a feeding ground and habitat for fish, shrimp, and other species, as the root structure of mangroves provides a refuge from larger predators.

A number of volcanoes lie within and around the gulf.

== In popular culture ==
The Horatio Hornblower novel The Happy Return (Beat To Quarters) is set partially in the Gulf of Fonseca.
