= 2018 Honduran Cup =

President's Cup

Tournament details
- Country: Honduras
- Dates: 22 July – 7 November 2018
- Teams: 64

Final positions
- Champions: Platense
- Runners-up: Real España

Tournament statistics
- Matches played: 65
- Goals scored: 220 (3.38 per match)
- All statistics correct as of 7 November 2018.

The 2018 Honduran Cup was the 13th edition of the Honduran Cup and the fourth as Copa Presidente. The tournament was announced on 13 April 2018.

The cup was contested by 64 teams from the top 3 divisions. There were a total of 10 teams from Liga Nacional (1st division), 28 from Liga de Ascenso (2nd division) and 26 from Liga Mayor (3rd division).

C.D. Marathón were the defending champions. Platense F.C. obtained their third title after beating 2–1 Real C.D. España in the final and will face the league winners in the 2019 Honduran Supercup.

== Schedule and format ==
The schedule for the first round was published on 28 June. The tournament started on 22 July.

Round	Date		Fixtures	Clubs
Round	First leg	Second leg	Fixtures	Clubs
Round of 64	22–28 July		32	64 → 32
Round of 32	22–23 August		16	32 → 16
Round of 16	4–5 September		8	16 → 8
Quarterfinals	25–26 September		8	8 → 4
Semifinals	17 October	24 October	4	4 → 2
Final	7 November		1	2 → 1

== Round of 64 ==
22 July 2018 Round of 64	Congolón	0–3	Real España	Ocotepeque
10:00			36' (pen.) Benavídez; 63' Martínez; 90' García	Stadium: Estadio John F. Kennedy; Referee: Héctor Rodríguez

22 July 2018 Round of 64	Bayer	2–2 (2–4 p)	París	Puerto Lempira
11:00				Stadium: Estadio Brown; Referee: Rigoberto González

22 July 2018 Round of 64	San José	1–2	Municipal Valencia	Marcala
13:00				Stadium: Estadio Rigoberto Hernández; Referee: Pedro Martínez

22 July 2018 Round of 64	La Virtud	1–11	Marathón	Gracias
14:00				Stadium: Estadio Marco Augusto Hernández; Referee: Raúl Castro

22 July 2018 Round of 64	Atlético Gualaco	1–2	Atlético Esperanzano	Gualaco
14:00				Stadium: Estadio Municipal; Referee: Álex Morazán

22 July 2018 Round of 64	Atlético Morazán	3–0	Broncos del Sur	Monjarás
14:00				Stadium: Estadio Evatisto Nájera; Referee: Jairo García

22 July 2018 Round of 64	El Carmen	0–8	Olimpia	Jesús de Otoro
14:00				Stadium: Estadio Manuel Castillo; Referee: Melvin Matamoros

22 July 2018 Round of 64	Juventud Católica	1–1 (6–7 p)	Santos	Danlí
14:00				Stadium: Estadio Marcelo Tinoco; Referee: Harold Salgado

22 July 2018 Round of 64	Altamira	1–1 (5–4 p)	Olancho	El Paraíso
14:00				Stadium: Estadio Oro Verde; Referee: Gerardo Rodríguez

22 July 2018 Round of 64	Las Delicias	2–1	Motagua	San Francisco de la Paz
14:00	Rosales 84' 86'		88' Vega	Stadium: Estadio Óscar Peralta; Referee: Nelson Salgado

22 July 2018 Round of 64	Porvenir	1–4	Gimnástico	Siguatepeque
14:00				Stadium: Estadio Roberto Martínez Ávila; Referee: José Franco

22 July 2018 Round of 64	Atlético Limeño	2–1	Pinares	La Lima
14:00				Stadium: Estadio Milton Flores; Referee: Cristóbal Gonzales

22 July 2018 Round of 64	Calvario	1–1 (4–3 p)	Comayagua	Langue
14:00				Stadium: Estadio Jorge Arias; Referee: Wilmer Flores

22 July 2018 Round of 64	Cuevas	1–3	UPNFM	Cantarranas
14:00				Stadium: Estadio Francisco Gaitán; Referee: Manuel Zelaya

22 July 2018 Round of 64	Atlético Barajas	0–6	Platense	Copán Ruinas
14:00				Stadium: Estadio Copán Galel; Referee: Rigoberto Perdomo

22 July 2018 Round of 64	Galaxy	1–3	Deportes Savio	Ocotepeque
15:00				Stadium: Estadio John F. Kennedy; Referee: Denis Castro

22 July 2018 Round of 64	Pumas	2–3	Honduras Progreso	Las Vegas
15:00				Stadium: Estadio Municipal; Referee: Nelson Mejía

22 July 2018 Round of 64	San Lorenzo Júnior	2–3	Juticalpa	San Lorenzo
15:00				Stadium: Estadio Ángel Augusto Martínez; Referee: José Ramírez

22 July 2018 Round of 64	Bucaneros	2–2 (1–4 p)	Real Sociedad	La Ceiba
15:00				Stadium: Estadio Nilmo Edwards; Referee: Geovany Santos

22 July 2018 Round of 64	Atlético Municipal	1–5	Villanueva	Tocoa
15:00				Stadium: Estadio Roberto Martínez; Referee: Manuel Jandres

22 July 2018 Round of 64	Galaxy	2–1	Arsenal	Coxen Hole
15:00				Stadium: Estadio Julio Galindo; Referee: Nelson Arriaza

22 July 2018 Round of 64	La Ensenada	2–1	Victoria	Tela
15:00				Stadium: Estadio León Gómez; Referee: José Valladares

22 July 2018 Round of 64	Real Choloma	0–4	Parrillas One	Sabá
15:00				Stadium: Estadio Municipal; Referee: Marvin Ortiz

22 July 2018 Round of 64	Talleres	2–6	Vida	Potrerillos
15:30				Stadium: Estadio Melgar Castro; Referee: Allan Escobar

22 July 2018 Round of 64	Brasilia	2–2 (5–3 p)	Real Juventud	Río Lindo
16:00				Stadium: Estadio Filiberto Fernández; Referee: Julio Gómez

22 July 2018 Round of 64	Paris Saint Germain	1–4	Yoro	San Manuel
16:00				Stadium: Estadio Municipal; Referee: Geovanny Mendoza

22 July 2018 Round of 64	San Juan	0–2	Lepaera	Quimistán
16:00				Stadium: Estadio Domingo Ortega; Referee: José Ulloa

22 July 2018 Round of 64	Nacional	0–8	Real de Minas	Choluteca
16:00				Stadium: Estadio Emilio Williams Agasse; Referee: Selvin Brown

22 July 2018 Round of 64	Empa	2–2 (3–4 p)	Social Sol	El Progreso
19:00				Stadium: Estadio Humberto Micheletti; Referee: Carlos Martínez

25 July 2018 Round of 64	Atlético Choloma	2–0	Boca Júnior	Choloma
18:00				Stadium: Estadio Rubén Deras; Referee: Erick Carbajal

27 July 2018 Round of 64	Siguatepeque	1–3	Estrella Roja	Siguatepeque
18:00				Stadium: Estadio Roberto Martínez Ávila; Referee: David Carrasco

28 July 2018 Round of 64	Tela	4–2	Olimpia Occidental	Tela
15:00				Stadium: Estadio León Gómez; Referee: James Salinas

== Round of 32 ==
The schedule for the Round of 32 was unveiled on 14 August.

22 August 2018 Round of 32	Altamira	0–2	Olimpia	El Paraíso
14:00			52' Güity; 70' Mejía	Stadium: Estadio Oro Verde

22 August 2018 Round of 32	Atlético Morazán	2–4	UPNFM	Monjarás
14:00				Stadium: Estadio Evaristo Nájera

22 August 2018 Round of 32	San José	0–2	Santos	Marcala
14:00				Stadium: Estadio Rigoberto Hernández

22 August 2018 Round of 32	Real Sociedad	1–1 (5–6 p)	Vida	Tocoa
14:00				Stadium: Estadio Francisco Martínez Durón

22 August 2018 Round of 32	Calvario	0–7	Real de Minas	Langue
14:00			Palacios; Elvir; Reyna; Umanzor; Corrales; Padilla	Stadium: Estadio Jorge Arias

22 August 2018 Round of 32	Las Delicias	0–4	Juticalpa	San Francisco de la Paz
14:00			Oseguera; Cardona	Stadium: Estadio Óscar Peralta

22 August 2018 Round of 32	La Ensenada	1–1 (2–4 p)	Galaxy	Tela
15:00				Stadium: Estadio León Gómez

22 August 2018 Round of 32	Atlético Esperanzano	1–0	Lepaera	La Esperanza
17:00				Stadium: Estadio Romualdo Bueso

22 August 2018 Round of 32	Brasilia	0–1	Marathón	Río Lindo
18:00			89' Arboleda	Stadium: Estadio Filiberto Fernández

22 August 2018 Round of 32	Atlético Choloma	1–2	Platense	Choloma
18:30			45' Nieto; Aguilar	Stadium: Estadio Rubén Deras

22 August 2018 Round of 32	Deportes Savio	1–0	Honduras Progreso	Santa Rosa de Copán
19:00				Stadium: Estadio Sergio Antonio Reyes

22 August 2018 Round of 32	París	1–2	Atlético Limeño	San Manuel
19:00				Stadium: Estadio Municipal

22 August 2018 Round of 32	Parrillas One	1–1 (4–2 p)	Villanueva	San Pedro Sula
19:00				Stadium: Estadio General Francisco Morazán

22 August 2018 Round of 32	Yoro	0–0 (5–4 p)	Tela	Yoro
19:00				Stadium: Estadio Olímpico Yoreño

22 August 2018 Round of 32	Social Sol	0–1	Real España	Olanchito
19:00			32' López	Stadium: Estadio San Jorge

23 August 2018 Round of 32	Estrella Roja	0–0 (5–3 p)	Gimnástico	Danlí
15:30				Stadium: Estadio Marcelo Tinoco

== Round of 16 ==
The drawing was performed on 27 August.

4 September 2018 Round of 16	Parrillas One	2–0	Real de Minas	San Pedro Sula
19:00				Stadium: Estadio General Francisco Morazán

5 September 2018 Round of 16	Galaxy	0–1	Olimpia	Coxen Hole
15:00			Reyes	Stadium: Estadio Julio Galindo

5 September 2018 Round of 16	Estrella Roja	1–1 (2–4 p)	UPNFM	Danlí
15:30				Stadium: Estadio Marcelo Tinoco

5 September 2018 Round of 16	Atlético Esperanzano	1–3	Platense	La Esperanza
17:00				Stadium: Estadio Romualdo Bueso

5 September 2018 Round of 16	Yoro	0–0 (3–0 p)	Atlético Limeño	Yoro
19:00				Stadium: Estadio Olímpico Yoreño

5 September 2018 Round of 16	Santos	2–0	Vida	Siguatepeque
19:00				Stadium: Estadio Roberto Martínez Ávila

5 September 2018 Round of 16	Deportes Savio	2–2 (4–3 p)	Juticalpa	Santa Rosa de Copán
19:00				Stadium: Estadio Sergio Antonio Reyes

5 September 2018 Round of 16	Real España	3–0	Marathón	San Pedro Sula
19:00				Stadium: Estadio General Francisco Morazán; Referee: Orlando Hernández
Note: Match awarded to Real España with a 3–0 score after Marathón abandoned the field at '88 (0–0) for not accepting a penalty called by the referee.

== Quarterfinals ==
The draw was held on 18 September.

25 September 2018 Quarterfinals	Parrillas One	3–1	UPNFM	San Pedro Sula
19:00

26 September 2018 Quarterfinals	Yoro	2–0	Deportes Savio	Yoro
19:00				Stadium: Estadio Olímpico Yoreño

26 September 2018 Quarterfinals	Real España	1–0	Olimpia	San Pedro Sula
19:00	Martínez			Stadium: Estadio General Francisco Morazán; Referee: Melvin Matamoros

26 September 2018 Quarterfinals	Santos	2–3	Platense	Siguatepeque
20:00				Stadium: Estadio Roberto Martínez Ávila

== Semifinals ==
17 October 2018 1st leg	Real España	3–1	Parrillas One	San Pedro Sula
19:00	Martínez 50' 58'; López 90'		80' Barrios	Stadium: Estadio General Francisco Morazán

24 October 2018 2nd leg	Parrillas One	1–0 (2–3 agg.)	Real España	San Pedro Sula
19:00				Stadium: Estadio General Francisco Morazán

17 October 2018 1st leg	Platense	2–0	Yoro	Puerto Cortés
19:00	Britto 31' de León 45+1'			Stadium: Estadio Excélsior

24 October 2018 2nd leg	Yoro	0–3 (0–5 agg.)	Platense	Yoro
19:00			Aguilar; Lobo	Stadium: Estadio Olímpico Yoreño

== Final ==
7 November 2018 Final	Platense	2–1	Real España	San Pedro Sula
19:00	Nieto 54'; Reyes 71' Starting XI (GK) Zúniga – 1 Bolaños – 3 Matute – 4 Winchester – 7 Nieto – 8 Altamirano – 11; Vargas – 12; Flores – 21; Aguilar – 22; Mendoza – 25; Arriaga – 33		85' Benavídez Starting XI; 1 – Hernández (GK); 10 – Martínez; 15 – Vargas; 16 – Leverón; 17 – Claros; 18 – Vuelto; 19 – López; 23 – Delgado; 24 – Borjas; 28 – Oseguera; 38 – Benavídez	Stadium: Estadio Olímpico Metropolitano; Referee: Melissa Borjas

== Prizes ==
Team	Prize
Winner	L500,000
Runners-up	L300,000
