= 2019–20 Honduran Liga Nacional de Ascenso =

Liga de Ascenso
- Season: 2019–20
- Dates: August 2019–June 2020
- Champions: Apertura: Pinares; Clausura: Delicias
- Promoted: None
- Relegated: TBD
- All statistics correct as of 1 December 2019.

The 2019–20 Honduran Liga Nacional de Ascenso is the 53rd season of the Second level in Honduran football and the 18th under the name Liga Nacional de Ascenso. The tournament is divided into two halves (Apertura and Clausura), each crowning one champion.

== Apertura ==
The Apertura tournament runs from August to December 2019. Santos F.C. qualified to a final series for their second tournament in a row. They faced C.A. Pinares, who won their first title.

=== Regular season ===
==== Group A ====
Pos	Team	Pld	W	D	L	GF	GA	GD	Pts	Qualification
1	Victoria	14	11	2	1	39	18	+21	35	Round of 16
2	Boca Juniors	14	6	6	2	28	15	+13	24	Round of 16
3	Santa Rosa	14	7	3	4	16	15	+1	24	Round of 16
4	Tela	14	7	3	4	22	14	+8	18	Round of 16
5	San Manuel	14	5	3	6	17	19	−2	18	
6	Bucanero	14	3	3	8	9	20	−11	12	
7	Yoro	14	2	4	8	11	26	−15	10	
8	Social Sol	14	0	6	8	13	28	−15	6	

Updated to match(es) played on 3 November 2019. Source: Diez
Rules for classification: 1) Points; 2) Goal difference; 3) Goals scored.

==== Group B ====
Pos	Team	Pld	W	D	L	GF	GA	GD	Pts	Qualification
1	Pinares	14	11	1	2	34	15	+19	34	Round of 16
2	San Juan	14	9	2	3	38	21	+17	29	Round of 16
3	Real Juventud	14	7	1	6	24	20	+4	22	Round of 16
4	Lepaera	14	6	3	5	31	27	+4	21	Round of 16
5	Deportes Savio	14	4	4	6	20	26	−6	16	
6	Atlético Esperanzano	14	4	3	7	14	29	−15	15	
7	Olimpia Occidental	14	4	2	8	21	28	−7	14	
8	Azacualpa	14	1	4	9	11	27	−16	7	

Updated to match(es) played on 3 November 2019. Source: Diez
Rules for classification: 1) Points; 2) Goal difference; 3) Goals scored.

==== Group C ====
Pos	Team	Pld	W	D	L	GF	GA	GD	Pts	Qualification
1	Atlético Independiente	14	7	4	3	35	23	+12	25	Round of 16
2	Santos	14	6	6	2	25	16	+9	24	Round of 16
3	Atlético Choloma	14	6	6	2	22	18	+4	24	Round of 16
4	Parrillas One	14	5	5	4	20	16	+4	20	Round of 16
5	Lone	14	5	5	4	27	25	+2	20	
6	Santa Cruz	14	2	7	5	19	30	−11	13	
7	Villanueva	14	2	6	6	13	22	−9	12	
8	Brasilia	14	2	3	9	12	23	−11	9	

Updated to match(es) played on 3 November 2019. Source: Diez
Rules for classification: 1) Points; 2) Goal difference; 3) Goals scored.

==== Group D ====
Pos	Team	Pld	W	D	L	GF	GA	GD	Pts	Qualification
1	Génesis Huracán	14	8	4	2	31	12	+19	28	Round of 16
2	Juticalpa	14	8	4	2	24	12	+12	28	Round of 16
3	Olancho	14	7	2	5	26	12	+14	23	Round of 16
4	Broncos	14	7	2	5	23	13	+10	23	Round of 16
5	Estrella Roja	14	6	4	4	25	18	+7	22	
6	Inter	14	6	1	7	22	34	−12	19	
7	Gimnástico	14	3	3	8	12	21	−9	12	
8	Delicias	14	0	2	12	1	42	−41	2	

Updated to match(es) played on 3 November 2019. Source: Diez
Rules for classification: 1) Points; 2) Goal difference; 3) Goals scored.

=== Postseason ===
==== Round of 16 ====
6 November 2019 1st leg	Olancho	2–3	Santos	Tegucigalpa
				Stadium: Complejo Deportivo Flor del Campo

9 November 2019 2nd leg	Santos	0–0 (3–2 agg.)	Olancho	Siguatepeque
19:30				Stadium: Estadio Roberto Martínez Ávila

6 November 2019 1st leg	Parrillas One	3–0	Génesis Huracán	San Pedro Sula
	Pineda 2' 29'; Díaz 74'			Stadium: Estadio General Francisco Morazán

9 November 2019 2nd leg	Génesis Huracán	1–0 (1–3 agg.)	Parrillas One	Tegucigalpa
19:00				Stadium: Estadio Birichiche

6 November 2019 1st leg	Atlético Choloma	3–1	Juticalpa	Choloma
19:00	Zavala 17'; Santos 49' 57'		11' Ocampo	Stadium: Estadio Rubén Deras

10 November 2019 2nd leg	Juticalpa	2–1 (3–4 agg.)	Atlético Choloma	Juticalpa
15:00	Estupiñán 90'			Stadium: Estadio Juan Ramón Brevé Vargas

6 November 2019 1st leg	Real Juventud	2–1	Boca Juniors	Santa Bárbara
19:00	Medina 45'; Lewis 85'		57' Welcome	Stadium: Estadio Argelio Sabillón

9 November 2019 2nd leg	Boca Juniors	1–2 (2–4 agg.)	Real Juventud	Olanchito
19:00				Stadium: Estadio San Jorge

7 November 2019 1st leg	Santa Rosa	3–3	San Juan	La Masica
15:00

10 November 2019 2nd leg	San Juan	3–1 (6–4 agg.)	Santa Rosa	Quimistán
15:30	García 32' 42'; Arévalo 54'		86'	Stadium: Estadio Domingo Ortega

7 November 2019 1st leg	Tela	1–1	Pinares	Tela
15:30				Stadium: Estadio León Gómez

10 November 2019 2nd leg	Pinares	0–0 (1–1 agg.)	Tela	Ocotepeque
15:00				Stadium: Estadio John F. Kennedy
Note: C.A. Pinares advanced on regular season record.

7 November 2019 1st leg	Broncos	2–2	Atlético Independiente	Choluteca
18:00				Stadium: Estadio Emilio Williams Agasse

10 November 2019 2nd leg	Atlético Independiente	2–1 (4–3 agg.)	Broncos	Siguatepeque
18:30				Stadium: Estadio Roberto Martínez Ávila

7 November 2019 1st leg	Lepaera	1–5	Victoria	Lepaera
19:00				Stadium: Estadio Juan Orlando Hernández

9 November 2019 2nd leg	Victoria	2–2 (7–3 agg.)	Lepaera	La Ceiba
19:30				Stadium: Estadio Nilmo Edwards

==== Quarterfinals ====
14 November 2019 1st leg	San Juan	2–0	Victoria	Quimistán
15:30				Stadium: Estadio Domingo Ortega; Referee: Marlon Díaz

17 November 2019 2nd leg	Victoria	2–2 (2–4 agg.)	San Juan	La Ceiba
10:00	Sánchez		Cartagena; García	Stadium: Estadio Nilmo Edwards; Referee: Armando Castro
Note: Due to a flooded pitch, this game was moved to the following day at 10:00.

14 November 2019 1st leg	Atlético Choloma	2–1	Atlético Independiente	Choloma
19:00				Stadium: Estadio Rubén Deras; Referee: Raúl Castro

17 November 2019 2nd leg	Atlético Independiente	2–0 (3–2 agg.)	Atlético Choloma	Siguatepeque
16:00	Torres 55'; Palma 68' (pen.)			Stadium: Estadio Roberto Martínez Ávila

14 November 2019 1st leg	Real Juventud	3–2	Pinares	Santa Bárbara
19:30				Stadium: Estadio Argelio Sabillón; Referee: Melvin Matamoros

17 November 2019 2nd leg	Pinares	1–0 (3–3 agg.)	Real Juventud	Ocotepeque
15:00	Sacaza 86'			Stadium: Estadio John F. Kennedy
Note: C.A. Pinares advanced on regular season record.

14 November 2019 1st leg	Parrillas One	0–0	Santos	San Pedro Sula
20:00				Stadium: Estadio General Francisco Morazán; Referee: Marvin Ortíz

16 November 2019 2nd leg	Santos	0–0 (0–0 agg.)	Parrillas One	Siguatepeque
20:00				Stadium: Estadio Roberto Martínez Ávila
Note: Santos F.C.S. advanced on regular season record.

==== Semifinals ====
23 November 2019 1st leg	Santos	2–1	Atlético Independiente	Siguatepeque
19:30	González; Riascos		Martínez	Stadium: Estadio Roberto Martínez Ávila; Referee: Óscar Moncada

1 December 2019 2nd leg	Atlético Independiente	3–5 (7–4 agg.)	Santos	Siguatepeque
18:30	Rodríguez 59'; Vásquez 73'; Calderón 90+2'		14' 29' Cabrera; 18' Riascos; 61' Mina; 70' Elvir	Stadium: Estadio Roberto Martínez Ávila

24 November 2019 1st leg	San Juan	2–2	Pinares	Quimistán
15:30	Arévalo 65'; Mikey 90'		38' Flores; Arizala	Stadium: Estadio Domingo Ortega; Referee: Raúl Castro

1 December 2019 2nd leg	Pinares	2–2 (4–4 agg.)	San Juan	Ocotepeque
15:00	Arizala; Solórzano 49'		4' Arévalo; 62' Castro	Stadium: Estadio John F. Kennedy
Note: C.A. Pinares advanced on regular season record.

==== Final ====
7 December 2019 1st leg	Santos	1–2	Pinares	Siguatepeque
19:30	Cabrera 32'		10' V. Solórzano; 46' S. Solórzano	Stadium: Estadio Roberto Martínez Ávila; Referee: Armando Castro

15 December 2019 2nd leg	Pinares	3–1 (5–2 agg.)	Santos	Ocotepeque
15:00	Solórzano 35'; Arizala 49'; Orellana 75'		4' Riascos	Stadium: Estadio John F. Kennedy; Referee: Óscar Moncada

== Clausura ==
The Clausura tournament runs from January to May 2020.

Cuartos de final Real Juventud 1-1 Olancho Olancho 3-2 Real Juventud Delicias F.C. 2-2 Boca Junior Boca Junior 1-1 Delicias F.C. Santos F.C. 0-1 San Juan San Juan 2-3 Santos F.C. Atletico Pinares 1-1 Paris F.C. Paris F.C. 1(4)-1(3) Atletico Pinares

Semifinales Olancho 1-0 Delicias F.C. Delicias F.C. 2-1 Olancho Santos F.C. 0-0 Paris F.C. Paris F.C. 1-1 SantosF.C.

Final Delicias 2-2 Santos F.C. Santos F.C. 1-3 Delicias

== Promotion ==
The winners of both Apertura and Clausura will face to decide the team promoted to 2020–21 Honduran Liga Nacional.

21 de June 2020 Delicias 1-1 (4-5) Real Sociedad
