= 2018–19 Honduran Liga Nacional de Ascenso =

Liga de Ascenso
- Season: 2018–19
- Dates: 17 August 2018–June 2019
- Champions: Apertura: Real Sociedad; Clausura: Olancho
- Promoted: Real Sociedad
- All statistics correct as of 23 June 2019.

The 2018–19 Honduran Liga Nacional de Ascenso is the 52nd season of the Second level in Honduran football and the 17th under the name Liga Nacional de Ascenso. The tournament is divided into two halves (Apertura and Clausura), each crowning one champion.

== Apertura ==
The Apertura tournament runs from August to December 2018. C.D. Real Sociedad won the tournament after defeating San Juan F.C. in the final series.

=== Regular season ===
==== Group A ====
Pos	Team	Pld	W	D	L	GF	GA	GD	Pts	Qualification
1	Real Sociedad	16	7	4	5	19	18	+1	25	Quarterfinals
2	Ensenada	16	7	4	5	23	23	0	25	Play-offs
3	Yoro	16	9	2	5	23	22	+1	23	Play-offs
4	Social Sol	16	6	4	6	26	21	+5	22	
5	Bucanero	16	6	4	6	23	24	−1	22	
6	Tela	16	5	5	6	30	26	+4	20	
7	Boca Juniors	16	6	6	4	25	18	+7	18	
8	Arsenal	16	5	3	8	19	30	−11	12	
9	Victoria	16	3	4	9	17	23	−6	7	

Updated to match(es) played on 18 November 2018. Source: Diez
Rules for classification: 1) Points; 2) Goal difference; 3) Goals scored.

==== Group B ====
Pos	Team	Pld	W	D	L	GF	GA	GD	Pts	Qualification
1	San Juan	14	7	4	3	24	21	+3	25	Quarterfinals
2	Pinares	14	7	3	4	18	16	+2	24	Play-offs
3	Deportes Savio	14	6	4	4	18	19	−1	22	Play-offs
4	Lepaera	14	8	2	4	25	14	+11	20	
5	Atlético Esperanzano	14	5	4	5	24	21	+3	19	
6	Olimpia Occidental	14	5	3	6	25	25	0	18	
7	Lone	14	4	3	7	19	23	−4	15	
8	Real Juventud	14	1	3	10	24	38	−14	6	

Updated to match(es) played on 4 November 2018. Source: Diez
Rules for classification: 1) Points; 2) Goal difference; 3) Goals scored.

==== Group C ====
Pos	Team	Pld	W	D	L	GF	GA	GD	Pts	Qualification
1	Parrillas One	14	7	3	4	30	22	+8	24	Quarterfinals
2	Comayagua	14	7	3	4	19	16	+3	24	Play-offs
3	Atlético Limeño	14	9	2	3	30	19	+11	23	Play-offs
4	Santos	14	6	4	4	22	20	+2	22	
5	Villanueva	14	5	5	4	22	19	+3	20	
6	Brasilia	14	2	6	6	11	18	−7	12	
7	Atlético Choloma	14	3	3	8	18	24	−6	6	
8	París	14	4	0	10	17	30	−13	6	

Updated to match(es) played on 11 November 2018. Source: Diez
Rules for classification: 1) Points; 2) Goal difference; 3) Goals scored.

==== Group D ====
Pos	Team	Pld	W	D	L	GF	GA	GD	Pts	Qualification
1	Gimnástico	12	7	3	2	18	8	+10	24	Quarterfinals
2	Olancho	12	5	4	3	15	11	+4	19	Play-offs
3	Génesis Huracán	12	5	3	4	18	18	0	18	Play-offs
4	Estrella Roja	12	4	3	5	18	17	+1	15	
5	Delicias	12	6	2	4	18	14	+4	14	
6	Broncos	12	3	2	7	13	23	−10	11	
7	Broncos del Sur	12	3	1	8	16	25	−9	10	

Updated to match(es) played on 7 November 2018. Source: Diez
Rules for classification: 1) Points; 2) Goal difference; 3) Goals scored.

=== Postseason ===
==== Play-offs ====
11 November 2018 1st leg	Atlético Limeño	2–0	Olancho	La Lima
10:30				Stadium: Estadio Milton Flores

17 November 2018 2nd leg	Olancho	4–1 (4–3 agg.)	Atlético Limeño	Juticalpa
16:00				Stadium: Estadio Ramón Sarmiento

21 November 2018 1st leg	Génesis Huracán	0–2	Comayagua	Tegucigalpa
19:00			Linares	Stadium: Estadio Birichiche

24 November 2018 2nd leg	Comayagua	2–2 (4–2 agg.)	Génesis Huracán	Comayagua
19:00				Stadium: Estadio Carlos Miranda

21 November 2018 1st leg	Deportes Savio	2–0	Ensenada	Santa Rosa de Copán
19:00	Murillo; Arriola			Stadium: Estadio Sergio Antonio Reyes

25 November 2018 2nd leg	Ensenada	3–1 (3–3 agg.) (12–11 p)	Deportes Savio	Tela
15:00				Stadium: Estadio León Gómez

22 November 2018 1st leg	Yoro	1–2	Pinares	Yoro
19:00				Stadium: Estadio Olímpico Yoreño

25 November 2018 2nd leg	Pinares	3–0 (5–1 agg.)	Yoro	Ocotepeque
15:00

==== Quarterfinals ====
24 November 2018 1st leg	Olancho	2–0	Real Sociedad	Juticalpa
16:00				Stadium: Estadio Ramón Sarmiento

2 December 2018 2nd leg	Real Sociedad	2–0 (2–2 agg.) (4–2 p)	Olancho	Tocoa
15:00				Stadium: Estadio Francisco Martínez Durón

30 November 2018 1st leg	Comayagua	3–0	San Juan	Comayagua
19:00				Stadium: Estadio Carlos Miranda

9 December 2018 2nd leg	San Juan	6–0 (6–3 agg.)	Comayagua	Quimistán
				Stadium: Estadio Domingo Ortega

2 December 2018 1st leg	Ensenada	0–0	Gimnástico	Tela
14:00				Stadium: Estadio León Gómez

7 December 2018 2nd leg	Gimnástico	3–0 (3–0 agg.)	Ensenada	Tegucigalpa
19:00				Stadium: Estadio El Birichiche

2 December 2018 1st leg	Pinares	1–1	Parrillas One	Ocotepeque
15:00

8 December 2018 2nd leg	Parrillas One	1–1 (2–2 agg.) (3–4 p)	Pinares	Tela
				Stadium: Estadio León Gómez

==== Semifinals ====
16 December 2018 1st leg	Real Sociedad	2–1	Gimnástico	Tocoa
14:00				Stadium: Estadio Francisco Martínez Durón

19 December 2018 2nd leg	Gimnástico	0–0 (2–1 agg.)	Real Sociedad	Tegucigalpa
19:00				Stadium: Estadio El Birichiche

12 December 2018 1st leg	Pinares	3–1	San Juan	Ocotepeque
15:00				Stadium: Estadio John F. Kennedy

16 December 2018 2nd leg	San Juan	3–1 (4–4 agg.) (5–4 p)	Pinares	Quimistán
15:00				Stadium: Estadio Domingo Ortega

==== Final ====
23 December 2018 1st leg	San Juan	1–1	Real Sociedad	Quimistán
15:00	Chávez 43'		75' Arzú	Stadium: Estadio Domingo Ortega

30 December 2018 2nd leg	Real Sociedad	3–2 (4–3 agg.)	San Juan	Tocoa
14:00	Abbot 19' (pen.) 90+2'; Clark 40'		13' Hernández; Córdova	Stadium: Estadio Francisco Martínez Durón; Referee: Nelson Matamoros

== Clausura ==
The Clausura tournament runs from January to May 2019.

=== Regular season ===
==== Group A ====
Pos	Team	Pld	W	D	L	GF	GA	GD	Pts	Qualification
1	Real Sociedad	16	9	4	3	26	12	+14	31	Quarterfinals
2	Boca Juniors	16	8	5	3	21	16	+5	29	Play-offs
3	Victoria	16	8	3	5	25	22	+3	27	Play-offs
4	Social Sol	16	6	5	5	22	26	−4	23	
5	Ensenada	16	5	7	4	23	19	+4	22	
6	Bucanero	16	5	4	7	26	28	−2	19	
7	Tela	16	3	6	7	13	18	−5	15	
8	Yoro	16	3	5	8	17	24	−7	14	
9	Arsenal	16	3	5	8	11	18	−7	14	

Updated to match(es) played on 17 April 2019. Source: Diez
Rules for classification: 1) Points; 2) Goal difference; 3) Goals scored.

==== Group B ====
Pos	Team	Pld	W	D	L	GF	GA	GD	Pts	Qualification
1	Pinares	14	9	3	2	31	16	+15	30	Quarterfinals
2	San Juan	14	6	4	4	27	18	+9	22	Play-offs
3	Real Juventud (D)	14	6	2	6	18	12	+6	20	
4	Deportes Savio	14	5	4	5	21	21	0	19	Play-offs
5	Olimpia Occidental	14	6	1	7	17	28	−11	19	
6	Lone	14	4	5	5	13	16	−3	17	
7	Atlético Esperanzano	14	3	5	6	13	17	−4	14	
8	Lepaera	14	2	6	6	12	23	−11	12	

Updated to match(es) played on 17 April 2019. Source: Diez
Rules for classification: 1) Points; 2) Goal difference; 3) Goals scored.
(D) Disqualified
- Real Juventud disqualified from Championship Play-offs as they had to play for relegation Play-offs.

==== Group C ====
Pos	Team	Pld	W	D	L	GF	GA	GD	Pts	Qualification
1	Santos	14	8	3	3	20	14	+6	27	Quarterfinals
2	París	14	6	6	2	18	9	+9	24	Play-offs
3	Brasilia	14	6	5	3	17	12	+5	23	Play-offs
4	Parrillas One	14	5	6	3	20	17	+3	21	
5	Atlético Choloma	14	5	5	4	23	21	+2	20	
6	Villanueva	14	3	4	7	15	21	−6	13	
7	Atlético Limeño	14	1	7	6	16	25	−9	10	
8	Comayagua	14	1	5	8	5	16	−11	8	

Updated to match(es) played on 17 April 2019. Source: Diez
Rules for classification: 1) Points; 2) Goal difference; 3) Goals scored.

==== Group D ====
Pos	Team	Pld	W	D	L	GF	GA	GD	Pts	Qualification
1	Delicias	12	7	2	3	25	20	+5	23	Quarterfinals
2	Olancho	12	6	2	4	19	13	+6	20	Play-offs
3	Broncos	12	5	4	3	17	16	+1	19	Play-offs
4	Génesis Huracán	12	4	4	4	20	16	+4	16	
5	Broncos del Sur	12	3	5	4	14	15	−1	14	
6	Estrella Roja	12	3	4	5	8	13	−5	13	
7	Gimnástico	12	1	5	6	11	21	−10	8	

Updated to match(es) played on 17 April 2019. Source: Diez
Rules for classification: 1) Points; 2) Goal difference; 3) Goals scored.

=== Postseason ===
==== Play-offs ====
24 April 2019 1st leg	Brasilia	1–1	Olancho	Río Lindo
19:00				Stadium: Estadio Filiberto Fernández

27 April 2019 2nd leg	Olancho	4–1 (5–2 agg.)	Brasilia	Tegucigalpa
18:30				Stadium: Estadio Birichiche

24 April 2019 1st leg	Deportes Savio	2–2	Boca Juniors	Santa Rosa de Copán
19:30				Stadium: Estadio Sergio Antonio Reyes

28 April 2019 2nd leg	Boca Juniors	2–0 (4–2 agg.)	Deportes Savio	Tocoa
14:00				Stadium: Estadio Francisco Martínez Durón

24 April 2019 1st leg	Victoria	3–1	San Juan	La Ceiba
19:00				Stadium: Estadio Nilmo Edwards

28 April 2019 2nd leg	San Juan	7–1 (8–4 agg.)	Victoria	Quimistán
15:00				Stadium: Estadio Domingo Ortega

25 April 2019 1st leg	Broncos	1–1	París	Choluteca
19:30				Stadium: Estadio Emilio Williams Agasse
Note: The match was suspended by the referee at 85' due to pitch invasion.

28 April 2019 2nd leg	París	1–0 (2–1 agg.)	Broncos	San Manuel
16:00				Stadium: Estadio Municipal

==== Quarterfinals ====
4 May 2019 1st leg	Olancho	1–0	Real Sociedad	Juticalpa
18:15				Stadium: Estadio Ramón Sarmiento

12 May 2019 2nd leg	Real Sociedad	2–2 (2–3 agg.)	Olancho	Tocoa
14:00				Stadium: Estadio Francisco Martínez Durón

5 May 2019 1st leg	San Juan	3–2	Santos	Quimistán
15:00				Stadium: Estadio Domingo Ortega

11 May 2019 2nd leg	Santos	3–2 (5–5 agg.) (4–3 p)	San Juan	Siguatepeque
19:30	Arriola; Ventura; Cabrera		Córdova; Castro	Stadium: Estadio Roberto Martínez Ávila

5 May 2019 1st leg	Boca Juniors	0–0	Delicias	Tocoa
15:00				Stadium: Estadio Francisco Martínez Durón

12 May 2019 2nd leg	Delicias	1–3 (1–3 agg.)	Boca Juniors	San Francisco de la Paz
14:00				Stadium: Estadio Óscar Peralta

5 May 2019 1st leg	París	1–0	Pinares	San Manuel
16:00				Stadium: Estadio Municipal

11 May 2019 2nd leg	Pinares	3–2 (3–3 agg.) (4–3 p)	París	Ocotepeque
16:00				Stadium: Estadio John F. Kennedy

==== Semifinals ====
18 May 2019 1st leg	Pinares	0–0	Santos	Ocotepeque
16:00				Stadium: Estadio John F. Kennedy

25 May 2019 2nd leg	Santos	1–0 (1–0 agg.)	Pinares	Siguatepeque
19:30	Tinoco 30' (o.g.)			Stadium: Estadio Roberto Martínez Ávila

18 May 2019 1st leg	Olancho	1–1	Boca Juniors	San Francisco de la Paz
16:00				Stadium: Estadio Óscar Peralta

26 May 2019 2nd leg	Boca Juniors	0–2 (1–3 agg.)	Olancho	Tocoa
14:00				Stadium: Estadio Francisco Martínez Durón

==== Final ====
1 June 2019 1st leg	Olancho	0–1	Santos	Juticalpa
16:00			45+2' Cabrera	Stadium: Estadio Ramón Sarmiento

8 June 2019 2nd leg	Santos	1–2 (2–2 agg.) (1–3 p)	Olancho	Siguatepeque
19:30	Arriola 25'		3' Salinas; 31' Lalín	Stadium: Estadio Roberto Martínez Ávila; Referee: Héctor Rodríguez
	Penalties
	Arriola (penalty missed); Álvarez (penalty missed); Valencia (penalty scored); Urbina (penalty missed)		(penalty scored) Reyes; (penalty scored) Ortiz; (penalty scored) Rivera

== Promotion ==
C.D. Real Sociedad and Olancho F.C., the winners of both Apertura and Clausura respectively, faced to decide the team promoted to 2019–20 Honduran Liga Nacional. Real Sociedad obtained promotion again after being relegated one year ago.

16 June 2019 1st leg	Real Sociedad	0–1	Olancho	Tocoa
15:00			28' Sánchez	Stadium: Estadio Francisco Martínez Durón; Referee: Óscar Moncada

23 June 2019 2nd leg	Olancho	0–1 (1–1 agg.) (3–4 p)	Real Sociedad	Juticalpa
15:30			22' (o.g.) Sánchez	Stadium: Estadio Juan Ramón Brevé Vargas; Referee: Raúl Castro
