= List of universities in Honduras =

This is a list of universities in Honduras.

- Escuela Agrícola Panamericana Zamorano
- Universidad Nacional de Ciencias Forestales
- Universidad Católica de Honduras
- Universidad Católica Nuestra Señora Reina de La Paz
- Universidad Cristiana de Honduras
- Universidad de San Pedro Sula
- Universidad Evangélica
- Universidad Jesús de Nazareth
- Universidad José Cecilio del Valle
- Universidad Metropolitana de Honduras
- Universidad Nacional Autónoma de Honduras
- Universidad Nacional de Agricultura
- Universidad Tecnológica Centroamericana (UNITEC)
- Universidad Tecnológica de Honduras
