= El Porvenir, Atlántida =

El Porvenir
- Municipality
- Location in Honduras
- Coordinates: 15°45′N 86°56′W
- Country: Honduras
- Department: Atlántida
- Foundation: 18 April 1898; 128 years ago

Area
  - Municipality: 277 km^{2} (107 sq mi)

Population (2020 projection)
  - Municipality: 26,233
  - Density: 94.7/km^{2} (245/sq mi)
  - Urban: 18,082

El Porvenir (Spanish: The Future) is a town, with a population of 5,202 (2013 census), and a municipality in the Honduran department of Atlántida. The largest town of the Municipality is El Pino, with a population of 6,304 (2013 census).

== Geography ==
The municipality is in the department of Atlantida and borders with the city of La Ceiba, San Francisco. It counts the villages of El Pino and La Unión. Much of El Porvenir extends along a coastline. The beach is a popular place for both locals and visitors, especially during Semana Santa. Most of the area surrounding El Porvenir is dominated by pineapple fields.

== Transportation ==
El Porvenir is serviced by both buses and mototaxies. Buses come at infrequent intervals and depart for either La Ceiba or La Unión. Moto-taxies can only be taken within the city limits, but numerous taxis travel to La Ceiba and further. The CA-13 highway goes past El Porvenir and connects it to surrounding cities and the nearby Golosón International Airport.
