= Masica =

Masica may refer to:

- Colin Masica (1931–2022), American linguist
- La Masica, town in Honduras
