= Tela F.C. =

- Full name: Tela Fútbol Club
- Founded: 1979
- Ground: Estadio León Gómez; Tela, Atlántida Department, Honduras
- Capacity: 7,000
- Chairman: Domingo Ramos Moncada
- Manager: Luis Alvarado
- League: Honduran Liga Nacional de Ascenso
- Website: https://m.facebook.com/Telafutbolclub/?locale2=es_LA
Home colours	Away colours	Third colours

Tela F.C. is a Honduran football club from Tela, Atlántida Department. It was founded on 2014 and currently plays at the Honduran Liga Nacional de Ascenso.

== Current squad ==
Note: Flags indicate national team as defined under FIFA eligibility rules; some limited exceptions apply. Players may hold more than one non-FIFA nationality.

No.	Pos.	Nation	Player
—	GK	(Honduras) HON	Antony Martínez
—	GK	(Honduras) HON	Josué Núñez
—	DF	(Honduras) HON	Denzel Paniagua
—	DF	(Honduras) HON	Dixon Estrada
—	DF	(Honduras) HON	Alex Meráz
—	DF	(Honduras) HON	Reniery Rodríguez
—	DF	(Honduras) HON	Rigoberto Flores
—	DF	(Honduras) HON	Yadiel Izaguirre
—	DF	(Honduras) HON	Víctor Álvarez
—	MF	(Honduras) HON	Richard Mejía
—	MF	(Honduras) HON	Geancarlos Ávila
—	MF	(Honduras) HON	Genry Gil
—	MF	(Colombia) COL	Jonathan Mejía
—	MF	(Colombia) COL	Andrés Felipe Largo Marín

No.	Pos.	Nation	Player
—	MF	(Honduras) HON	Juan Suazo
—	MF	(Honduras) HON	Kevin Bonilla
—	MF	(Honduras) HON	Alexander Enamorado
—	MF	(Honduras) HON	Héctor Ulloa
—	MF	(Honduras) HON	Maynor Gutiérrez
—	MF	(Honduras) HON	Selvyn Andrés García
—	MF	(Honduras) HON	Víctor Mejía
—	FW	(Honduras) HON	Noel White
—	FW	(Honduras) HON	Maynor Díaz
—	FW	(Honduras) HON	Melvin Batiz
—	FW	(Honduras) HON	Jason García
—	FW	(Honduras) HON	Jeffry Orellana
—	FW	(Uruguay) URU	Ramiro Bruschi
