= 2019–20 in Honduran football =

Football in Honduras
- Season: 2019–20

Men's football
- Liga Nacional: Apertura: TBD; Clausura: TBD
- Liga de Ascenso: Apertura: TBD; Clausura: TBD
- Honduran Cup: TBD
- Honduran Supercup: TBD

The 2019–20 season is the 72nd season of competitive association football in Honduras.

== National teams ==
=== Senior team ===
==== CONCACAF Nations League ====
Pos	Team	Pld	W	D	L	GF	GA	GD	Pts	Qualification or relegation	(Honduras)	(Martinique)	(Trinidad and Tobago)
1	Honduras	4	3	1	0	8	1	+7	10	Qualification for Finals and Gold Cup	—	1–0	4–0
2	Martinique	4	0	3	1	4	5	−1	3	Qualification for Gold Cup	1–1	—	1–1
3	Trinidad and Tobago (R)	4	0	2	2	3	9	−6	2	Gold Cup prelims and League B	0–2	2–2	—

Source: CONCACAF
(R) Relegated

=== Olympic team ===
==== Pan American Games ====
Pos	Team	Pld	W	D	L	GF	GA	GD	Pts	Qualification
1	Uruguay	3	3	0	0	7	0	+7	9	Knockout stage
2	Honduras	3	1	1	1	5	6	−1	4	Knockout stage
3	Jamaica	3	1	0	2	3	5	−2	3	Fifth place match
4	Peru (H)	3	0	1	2	2	6	−4	1	Seventh place match

Source: Lima 2019
Rules for classification: Tie-breakers
(H) Hosts

Semi-finals
7 August – Lima
Mexico	1 (2)
Honduras (p)	1 (4)
7 August – Lima
Uruguay	0
Argentina	3

Gold medal match
10 August – Lima
Honduras	1
Argentina	4
Bronze medal match
10 August – Lima
Mexico	1
Uruguay	0

== Domestic clubs ==
=== Promotion and relegation ===
League	Promoted to league	Relegated from league
Liga Nacional	Real Sociedad	TBD
Liga de Ascenso	TBD	TBD

=== Summer transfers ===
Date	Name	Moving from	Moving to	Ref.
18 June 2019	(Honduras) Marlon Ramírez	(Honduras) Marathón	Honduras Progreso	
18 June 2019	(Honduras) Darvis Argueta	(Honduras) Marathón	Honduras Progreso	
18 June 2019	(Honduras) Samuel Lucas	(Honduras) Marathón	Honduras Progreso	
18 June 2019	(Honduras) Pedro Mencía	(Honduras) Platense	Honduras Progreso	
22 June 2019	(Honduras) Kevin Hernández	(Honduras) Platense	Honduras Progreso	
18 July 2019	(Honduras) Gerson Rodas	(Honduras) Platense	Honduras Progreso	
22 July 2019	(Trinidad and Tobago) Jerrel Britto	(Honduras) Platense	Honduras Progreso	
9 August 2019	(Honduras) Emilio Izaguirre	(Scotland) Celtic	(Honduras) Motagua	
4 September 2019	(Russia) Evgeni Kabaev	(Estonia) Levadia Tallinn	(Honduras) Real de Minas	

=== CONCACAF Champions League ===
Round of 16
(Costa Rica) San Carlos	3	0	3
(United States) New York City FC	5	1	6
(El Salvador) Alianza	2	2	4
(Mexico) UANL	1	4	5
(Costa Rica) Saprissa	2	0	2
(Canada) Montreal Impact (a)	2	0	2
(Honduras) Olimpia (p)	2	2	4 (4)
(United States) Seattle Sounders FC	2	2	4 (2)
(Mexico) León	2	0	2
(United States) Los Angeles FC	0	3	3
(Jamaica) Portmore United	1	0	1
(Mexico) Cruz Azul	2	4	6
(Guatemala) Comunicaciones	1	1	2 (3)
(Mexico) América (p)	1	1	2 (5)
(Honduras) Motagua	1	0	1
(United States) Atlanta United FC	1	3	4

Quarter-finals
(United States) New York City FC	0	0	0
(Mexico) UANL	1	4	5
(Canada) Montreal Impact	1	1	2
(Honduras) Olimpia (a)	2	0	2
16 December – Orlando
(United States) Los Angeles FC	2
(Mexico) Cruz Azul	1
(Mexico) América	3	0	3
(United States) Atlanta United FC	0	1	1

Semi-finals
19 December – Orlando
(Mexico) UANL	3
(Honduras) Olimpia	0
19 December – Orlando
(United States) Los Angeles FC	3
(Mexico) América	1

Final
22 December – Orlando
(Mexico) UANL	2
(United States) Los Angeles FC	1

=== CONCACAF League ===
Preliminary round
(Canada) Forge FC	2	0	2
(Guatemala) Antigua GFC	1	0	1
(Guatemala) Comunicaciones	2	1	3
(Honduras) Marathón	1	1	2
(Belize) Belmopan Bandits	1	1	2
(Costa Rica) Saprissa	3	3	6
(Suriname) Robinhood (a)	0	1	1
(Haiti) Capoise	0	1	1
(El Salvador) Alianza	5	1	6
(Panama) San Francisco	1	0	1
(Nicaragua) Real Estelí	2	0	2
(El Salvador) Santa Tecla (a)	1	1	2

Round of 16
(Canada) Forge FC	1	1	2
(Honduras) Olimpia	0	4	4
(Guatemala) Comunicaciones	2	0	2
(Guatemala) Guastatoya	1	0	1
(Costa Rica) Saprissa	2	0	2
(El Salvador) Águila	0	1	1
(Suriname) Robinhood	1	1	2
(Panama) Independiente	1	2	3
(El Salvador) Alianza	2	0	2
(Panama) Tauro	0	1	1
(El Salvador) Santa Tecla	0	0	0 (2)
(Costa Rica) San Carlos (p)	0	0	0 (4)
(Jamaica) Waterhouse (p)	1	1	2 (7)
(Costa Rica) Herediano	1	1	2 (6)
(Nicaragua) Managua	1	1	2
(Honduras) Motagua	2	1	3

Quarter-finals
(Honduras) Olimpia	2	0	2
(Guatemala) Comunicaciones	0	0	0
(Costa Rica) Saprissa	3	1	4
(Panama) Independiente	2	0	2
(El Salvador) Alianza	2	0	2
(Costa Rica) San Carlos	0	1	1
(Jamaica) Waterhouse	0	0	0
(Honduras) Motagua	2	0	2

Semi-finals
(Honduras) Olimpia	2	1	3
(Costa Rica) Saprissa	0	4	4
(El Salvador) Alianza	1	0	1
(Honduras) Motagua	1	3	4

Final
(Costa Rica) Saprissa	1	0	1
(Honduras) Motagua	0	0	0

=== Other matches ===
TBA

== Deaths ==
Date	Name	Born	Notes
11 August 2019	(Honduras) Walter Martínez	28 March 1982 (aged 37)	Former Honduras national football team player. Heart failure.
27 August 2019	(Honduras) Mario Caballero	23 August 1943 (aged 76)	Former C.D. Marathón player. Cardiac arrest.
2 September 2019	(Honduras) Morris Garden	–	Former C.D.S. Vida player.
5 October 2019	(Nicaragua) Roger Mayorga	10 July 1946 (aged 73)	Former F.C. Motagua goalkeeper. Heart attack.
7 January 2020	(Honduras) Geovany Alarcón	1965 or 1966 (aged 54)	Former Real C.D. España and C.D. Victoria footballer. Cancer.
