= Esparta =

- Location in Honduras
- Coordinates: 15°40′N 87°12′W
- Country: Honduras
- Department: Atlántida
- Foundation: 2 September 1902; 124 years ago

Area
  - Total: 398.1 km^{2} (153.7 sq mi)

Population (2015)
  - Total: 18,886
  - Density: 47.44/km^{2} (122.9/sq mi)

Esparta is a municipality in the Honduran department of Atlántida.
