= San Juan F.C. =

Honduran football club

- Full name: San Juan Fútbol Club
- Nickname(s): Garrobos (The Black Iguanas); El Equipo del Pueblo (The People's Team)
- Founded: October 1965
- Ground: Estadio Domingo Ortega, Quimistán, Santa Bárbara
- Chairman: Antonio Lara
- Manager: José Alvarado
- League: Liga de Ascenso
Home colours

San Juan F.C. is a football club located in Quimistán, Honduras, that competes in the Liga de Ascenso, the second tier of the Honduran football league system.

== History ==
Known as The People's Team, the club was founded in October 1965 as San Juancito by Abelardo Castillo in Quimistán, Santa Bárbara. Their first rivalry at that time was against Estrellita, which played their home games at the Catholic Church Plaza. Meanwhile, San Juancito played at the Central Plaza. One day, Raúl O'connor, the first president of San Juancito, suggested to merge these two and decided to rename the new club as San Juan Fútbol Club, as a tribute to the town's Patron saint.

In 2018, they reached the promotion play–offs to Honduran Liga Nacional de Ascenso which they lost to C.D. Bucaneros; however, they received an invitation to join the 2018–19 Liga de Ascenso season. They also participated in the 2017 and 2018 Honduran Cups.

== Stadium ==
San Juan F.C. play their home matches at Estadio Domingo Ortega, located at the Tierra Blanca neighborhood in Quimistán.

== Honours ==
- Honduran Liga Mayor
  - Runners-up (1): 2017–18
- Santa Bárbara Championship
  - Winners (30): ??
