= San Francisco, Atlántida =

San Francisco
- Municipality
- Nickname: Frisco
- Location in Honduras
- Coordinates: 15°40′N 87°2′W
- Country: Honduras
- Department: Atlántida

Government
  - Leader: rahzek

Area
  - Municipality: 282 km^{2} (109 sq mi)

Population (2020 projection)
  - Municipality: 16,315
  - Density: 57.9/km^{2} (150/sq mi)
  - Urban: 12,221

San Francisco (Spanish pronunciation: [saɱ fɾanˈsisko]) is a town, with a population of 3,437 (2013 census), and a municipality in the Honduran department of Atlántida. The largest town of the municipality is Santa Ana, with a population of 6,776 (2013 census).
