= Atlántida Department =

Atlántida Department Departamento de Atlántida
- Department
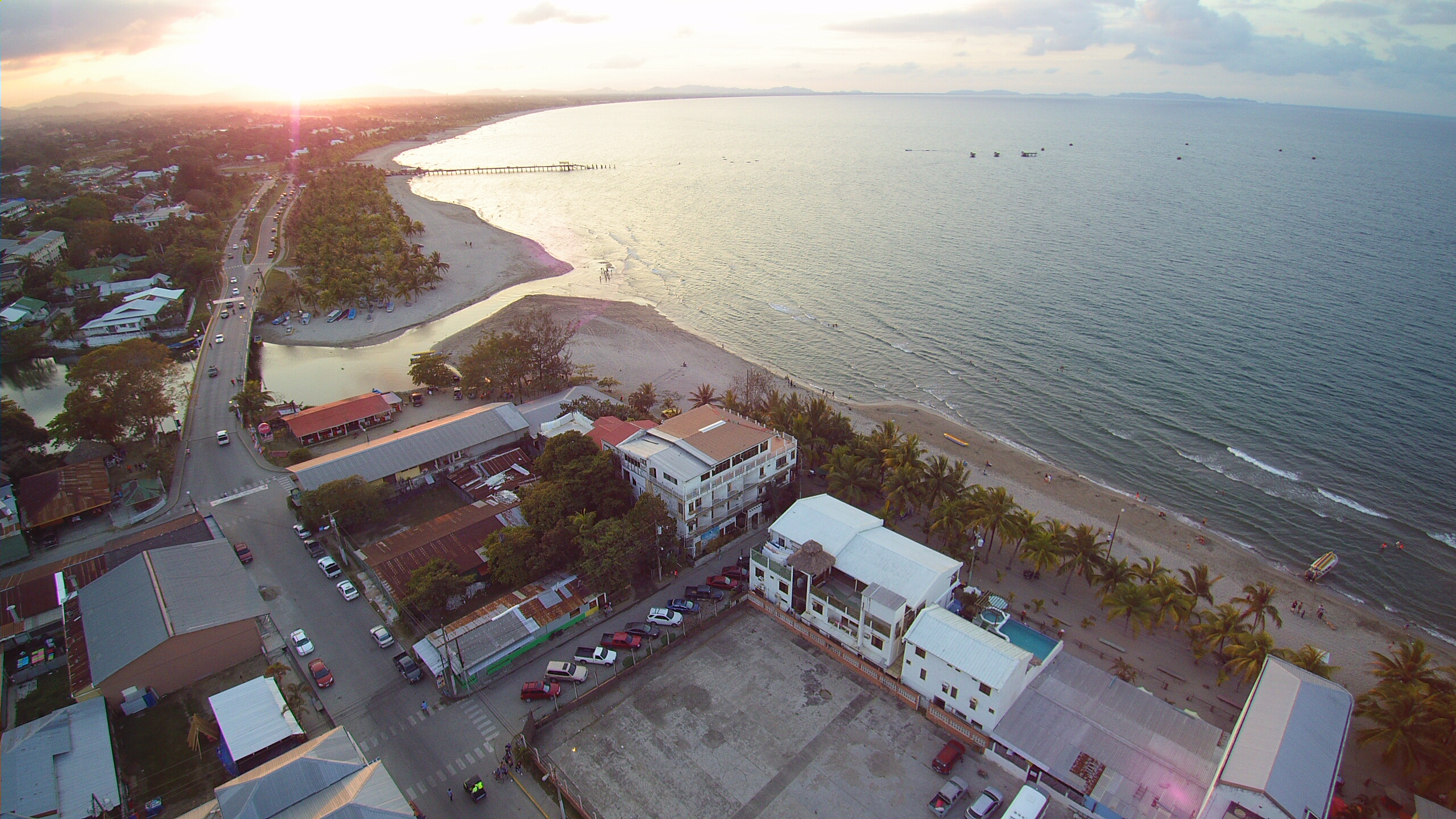
- View of Tela

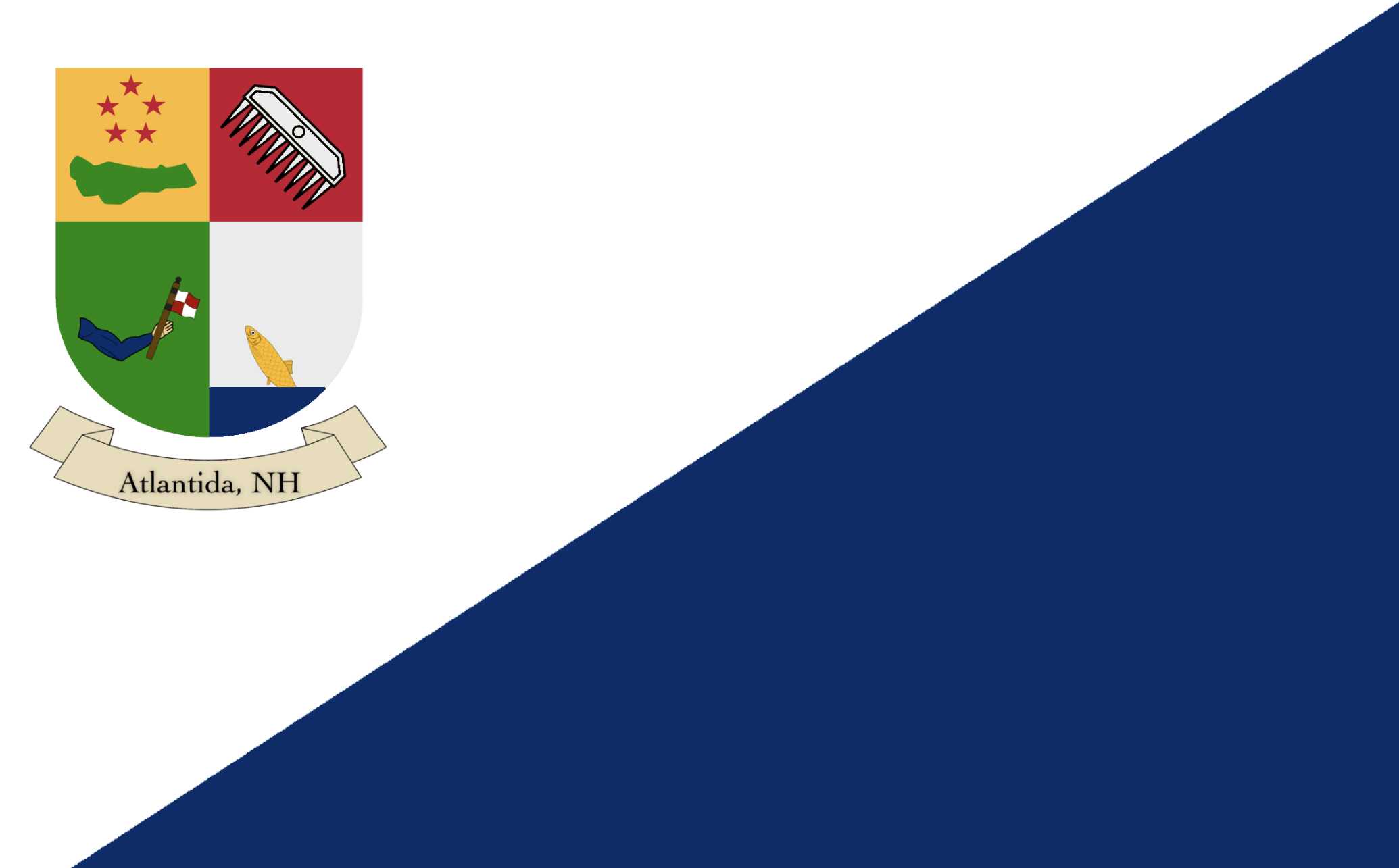
- Flag

- Coordinates: 15°38′36″N 87°07′54″W
- Country: Honduras
- Municipalities: 8
- Villages: 224
- Founded: 24 February 1902
- Capital city: La Ceiba

Government
  - Type: Departmental
  - Governor: Cesar Agurcia (2022-2026) (LibRe)

Area
  - Total: 4,227 km^{2} (1,632 sq mi)

Population (2015)
  - Total: 449,822
  - Density: 106.4/km^{2} (275.6/sq mi)

GDP (Nominal, 2015 US dollar)
  - Total: $1.5 billion (2023)
  - Per capita: $2,800 (2023)

GDP (PPP, constant 2015 values)
  - Total: $2.3 billion (2023)
  - Per capita: $5,800 (2023)
- Time zone: UTC-6 (CDT)
- Postal code: 31101
- ISO 3166 code: HN-AT
- HDI (2021): 0.627 medium · 4th of 18
- Statistics derived from Consult INE online database: Population and Housing Census 2013

Atlántida (Spanish pronunciation: [aˈtlan.ti.ða], lit. 'Atlantis') is a department located on the north Caribbean shore of Honduras. The capital is the port city of La Ceiba.

In the past few decades, tourism has become the most important legitimate economic source for the coastal area. In 2005 it had an estimated population of about 372,532 people. The department covers a total surface area of 4,251 km^{2} (1,641 sq mi).

== History ==
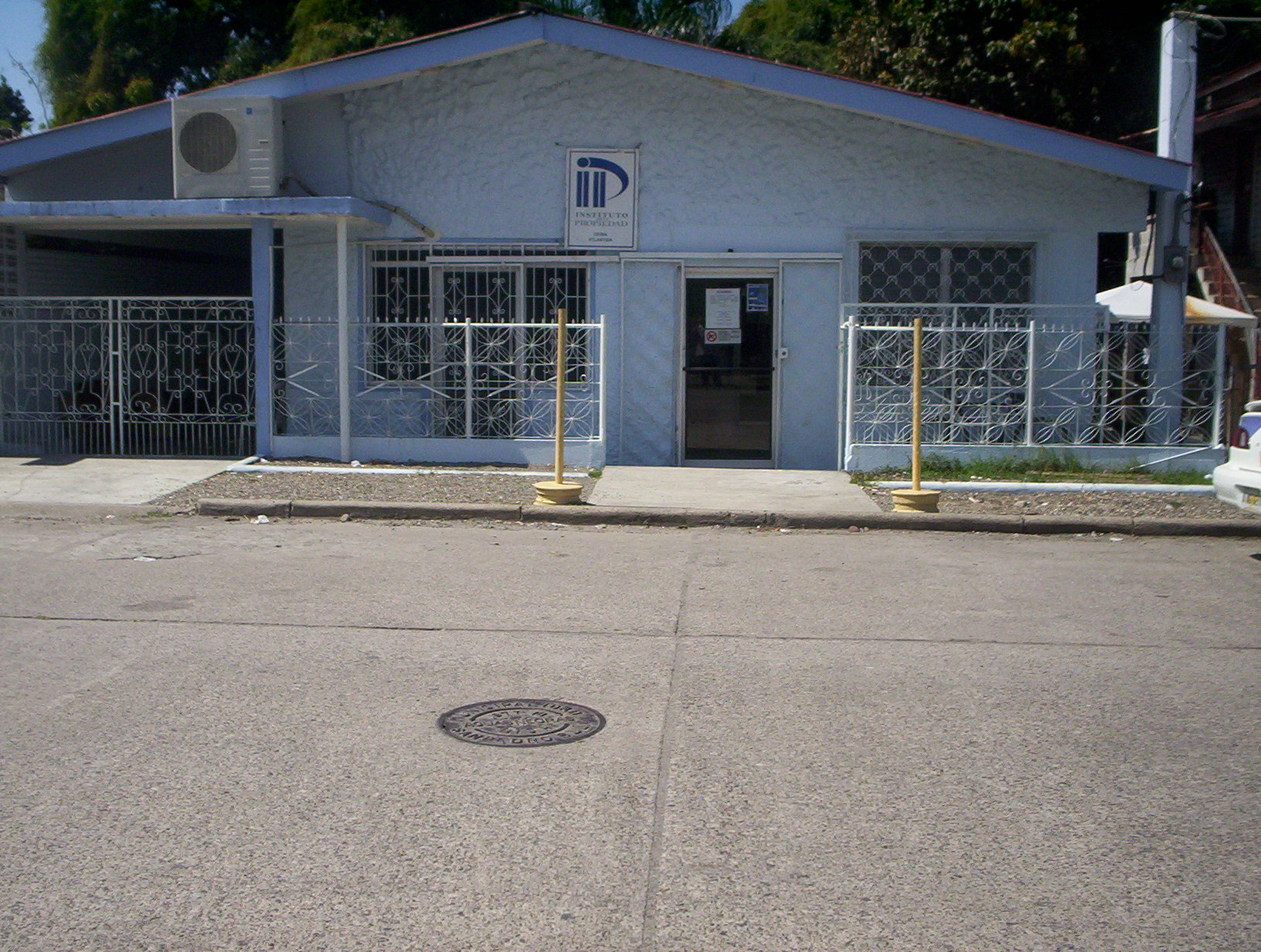
Land Registry Office for the Atlántida department in La Ceiba

The department was formed in 1902 from territory previously parts of the departments of Colón, Cortés, and Yoro. In 1910 it had a population of about 11,370 people.

== Municipalities ==

1. Arizona
2. El Porvenir
3. Esparta
4. Jutiapa
5. La Ceiba
6. La Masica
7. San Francisco
8. Tela

== Medical care ==
Medical care is available at the Jungle Hospital, which is located in the village of Rio Viejo, 20.1 road kilometers south of La Ceiba in the valley of the Rio Cangrejal. From La Ceiba, one should take the Carretera a La Cuenca (V200) to Rio Viejo.
