= Juan David Arizala =

Colombian footballer (born 2005)

Personal information
- Full name: Juan David Arizala Micolta
- Date of birth: 10 October 2005 (age 21)
- Place of birth: El Charco, Nariño, Colombia
- Height: 1.83 m (6 ft 0 in)
- Positions: Left-back; left wing-back

Team information
- Current team: Udinese
- Number: 20

Youth career
- 2016–2020: CRP Cali
- 2020–2023: Cyclones Cali
- 2023: Independiente Medellín

Senior career*
Years	Team	Apps	(Gls)
2023–2026	Independiente Medellín	45	(3)
2026–	Udinese	10	(0)

International career^{‡}
2025–	Colombia U20	22	(1)
2026–	Colombia	1	(0)
Medal record
Men's football
Representing Colombia
FIFA U-20 World Cup
Third place	2025 Chile
South American U-20 Championship
Third place	2025 Venezuela
- * Club domestic league appearances and goals as of 25 May 2026 ‡ National team caps and goals as of 13 November 2026

Juan David Arizala Micolta (born 10 October 2005) is a Colombian professional footballer who plays as a left-back or left wing-back for Serie A club Udinese and the Colombia national team.

== Club career ==
=== Youth career ===
Born in El Charco in the Nariño Department of Colombia, Arizala began his career in the Valle del Cauca Department with Cali-based Cyclones FC. Having impressed at the 2021 Torneo Internacional de las Américas, he was named captain of Cyclones for 2022, and was called up to a Valle del Cauca Department select team for his performances.

=== Independiente Medellín ===
He joined professional side Independiente Medellín in January 2023, and two months later was promoted from the under-20 team to the senior squad. He made his professional debut for the side in the same month, coming on as a second-half substitute for Johan Martínez in a 2–0 away loss to Boyacá Chicó in the Categoría Primera A.

=== Udinese ===
On 6 January 2026, Arizala moved to Italy and signed a four-and-a-half-year contract with Serie A club Udinese.

== International career ==
He has been a youth international for Colombia, representing the under-20 team since 2025.

Arizala made his debut for the Colombia national team on 13 November 2026 in a friendly against Chile.

== Career statistics ==
As of 29 August 2023.

Appearances and goals by club, season and competition
Club	Season	League			Copa Colombia		Continental		Other		Total	
Club	Season	Division	Apps	Goals	Apps	Goals	Apps	Goals	Apps	Goals	Apps	Goals
Independiente Medellín	2023	Categoría Primera A	6	0	1	0	1 (Note: Appearance in Copa Sudamericana)	0	0	0	8	0
Career total			6	0	1	0	1	0	0	0	8	0

== Honours ==
Colombia U20

- FIFA U-20 World Cup third place: 2025
