= Bryan Reyes =

Colombian footballer (born 1992)

Personal information
- Full name: Bryan Camilo Reyes Silva
- Date of birth: 17 August 1992 (age 34)
- Place of birth: Cúcuta, Colombia
- Height: 1.69 m (5 ft 7 in)
- Position: Midfielder

Youth career
- 2005–2007: Cúcuta Deportivo
- 2008–2010: Expreso Rojo

Senior career*
Years	Team	Apps	(Gls)
2008–2011	Expreso Rojo	32	(1)
2012–2016	Audax Italiano	10	(0)
2012	→ Fernández Vial (loan)	16	(1)
2012–2014	Audax Italiano B	23	(5)
2014–2015	→ San Luis (loan)	9	(0)
- * Club domestic league appearances and goals

Bryan Camilo Reyes Silva (born 17 August 1992) is a Colombian former professional footballer who played as a midfielder.

== Teams ==
- (Colombia) Expreso Rojo 2008–2011
- (Chile) Audax Italiano 2012–2016
- (Chile) Fernández Vial (loan) 2012
- (Chile) Audax Italiano B 2012–2014
- (Chile) San Luis de Quillota (loan) 2014–2015
