= Universidad Nacional de Ciencias Forestales =

Public university in Honduras

Coordinates: 14.580562918766848°N 87.83613292784678°W

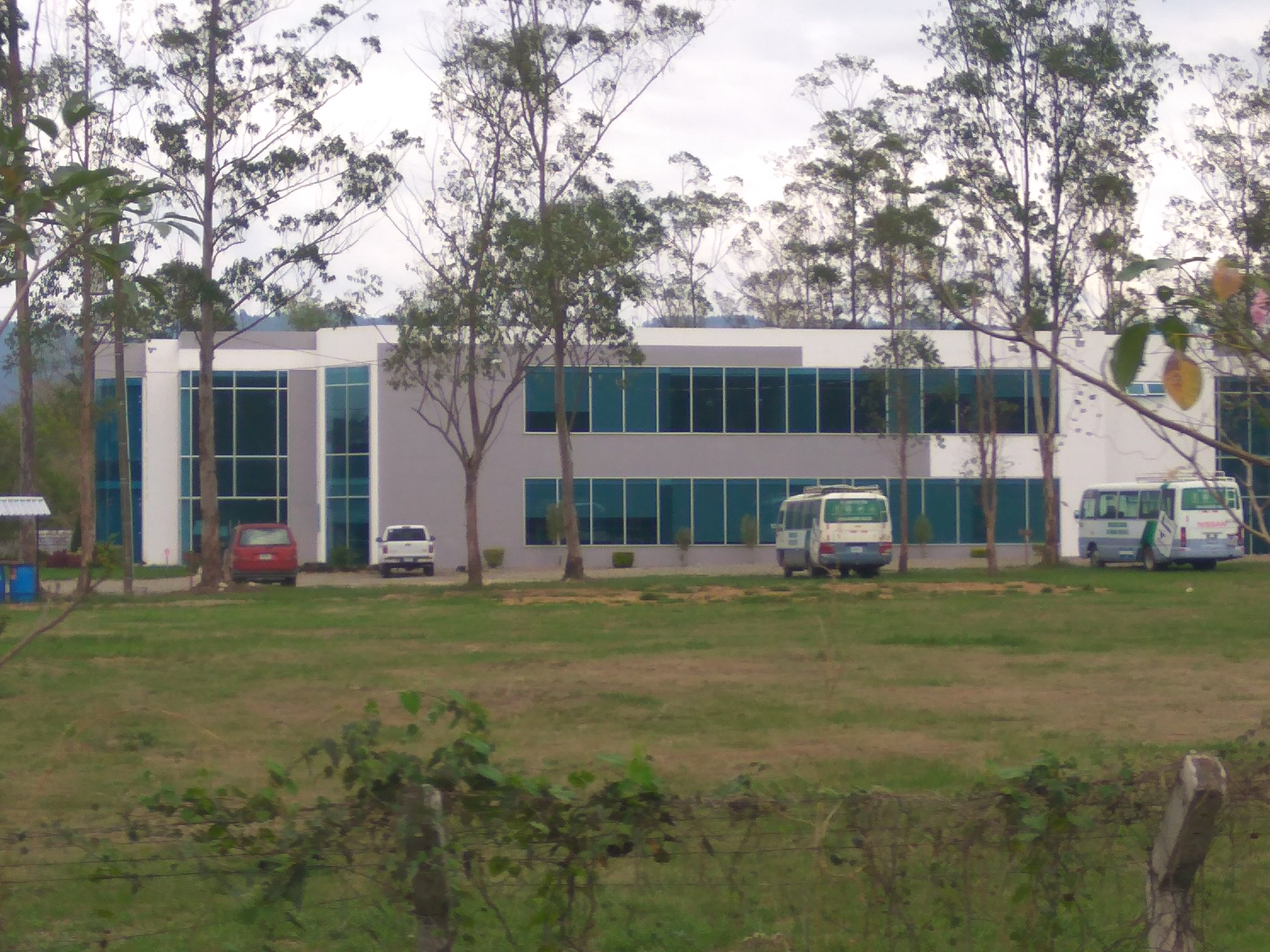
- Other names: UNACIFOR
- Former names: Escuela Nacional de Ciencias Forestales
- Established: 1969
- Location: Honduras
- Website: http://www.unacifor.edu.hn

Universidad Nacional de Ciencias Forestales (National University of Forestry Sciences, UNACIFOR), previously known as Escuela Nacional de Ciencias Forestales or ESNACIFOR, is a public university specialized in forestry sciences, serving Honduras and Central America. It is located in Siguatepeque.

== History ==
The Escuela Nacional de Ciencias Forestales (National School of Forestry Sciences)l was founded in 1969 by the Government of Honduras, the United Nations Development Programme and the United Nations Food and Agricultural Organization as a training center.

In 1993, the Government of Honduras issued a decree to establish the school as a decentralized public entity. In 2016, the Consejo Superior de Educación (High Council for Education) approved its transformation into a University.

== Academics ==
The University offers technical training in forestry management, three forestry engineering degrees and two Masters degrees. Over 1400 professional foresters have graduated from ESNACIFOR. A development plan is in effect that provides reviews of the fundamental strategy every 10 years, tactical plan every five years, and evaluations every three months. The four parts of the school are action areas (training programs), general management, academics, and production and services (income for sustaining the school). The Lancetilla Botanical Garden is managed by the University.
