= Santos F.C.S. =

Honduran football club

- Full name: Santos Fútbol Club de Siguatepeque
- Founded: 25 July 2017
- Dissolved: 2021
- Ground: Estadio Roberto Martínez Ávila, Siguatepeque, Comayagua
- Capacity: 7,000
- Manager: Mauro German Reyes
- League: Liga de Ascenso
Home colours

Santos F.C.S. is a football club located in Siguatepeque, Honduras, that competes in the Liga de Ascenso, the second tier of the Honduran football league system.

== History ==
Santos F.C.S. was founded on 25 July 2017. In July 2018, they purchased Atlético Municipal's franchise and began playing at the Liga de Ascenso for the 2018–19 season. Before the start of the 2020–21 season, they sold their franchise to Sabá F.C. and ceased operations.

== Performance by year ==
Regular season			Postseason	
Season	Finish	Record	Finish	Record
2018–19 A	4th	6–4–4 (22:20)	Didn't enter	
2018–19 C	1st	8–3–3 (20:14)	Finalist	In progress

== Stadium ==
Santos F.C.S. play their home matches at Estadio Roberto Martínez Ávila, located in Siguatepeque.
