= Estadio Milton Flores =

Stadium in La Lima, Honduras

- Interactive map of Estadio Milton Flores
- Address: La Lima; Honduras
- Coordinates: 15.2625°N 87.5553°W
- Current use: football

Tenant
- Atletico Limeño

Estadio Milton Flores is a multi-use stadium in La Lima, Honduras. It is used mostly for football matches and is the home stadium of Atletico Limeño.
