= Estadio Roberto Martínez Ávila =

Football stadium in Siguatepeque, Honduras

- Interactive map of Estadio Roberto Martínez Ávila
- Full name: Estadio Roberto Martínez Ávila
- Location: Siguatepeque, Honduras
- Coordinates: 14.59008°N 87.841342°W
- Owner: Siguatepeque Municipality
- Capacity: 7 000
- Surface: Grass
- Field size: 105 x 70

Construction
- Built: 1980
- Opened: 1980

Tenants
- Atlético Independiente (1980–); Parrillas One (2014–2015); Santos (2018–)

The Estadio Roberto Martínez Ávila is a football stadium in Siguatepeque, Honduras. It is currently used for football matches and is the home of Atlético Independiente of the Liga de Ascenso.

== Events ==
The Estadio Roberto Martínez Ávila hosted the following major international football events.

Competition	Years
UNCAF U-19 Tournament	2018
