= San Francisco de la Paz =

San Francisco de la Paz Achuluapa
- Municipality
- Nickname: San Pancho
- Location within Honduras
- Coordinates: 14°54′N 86°12′W
- Country: Honduras
- Department: Olancho
- Villages: 13

Government

Area
  - Total: 533.7 km^{2} (206.1 sq mi)

Population (2015)
  - Total: 19,690
  - Density: 36.89/km^{2} (95.55/sq mi)
- Climate: Aw

San Francisco de la Paz (Spanish pronunciation: [saɱ fɾanˈsisko ðe la ˈpas]) is a municipality in the centre of the Honduran department of Olancho.

First known as San Francisco Zapote, the name was changed by bishop Francisco de Paula Campoy y Pérez, for the actual name. The town is located in a small valley formed by the hills "La Cruz" (The Cross) and "Cayo Blanco" (White Cay) in the North and the hill "El Ocotal" in the South.

The extension of San Francisco de la Paz is 540.2 km².

== Demographics ==
At the time of the 2013 Honduras census, San Francisco de la Paz municipality had a population of 19,216. Of these, 98.64% were Mestizo, 0.51% White, 0.50% Indigenous, 0.23% Black or Afro-Honduran and 0.12% others.
