= La Masica =

- Municipality
- Location in Honduras
- Coordinates: 15°39′N 87°06′W
- Country: Honduras
- Department: Atlántida
- Founded: 13 November 1922; 104 years ago

Government
  - Mayor: Ovidio Nahún Turcios Calidonio (PL)

Area
  - Municipality: 468 km^{2} (181 sq mi)

Population (2020 projection)
  - Municipality: 32,277
  - Density: 69.0/km^{2} (179/sq mi)
  - Urban: 17,473
- Postal code: 31501

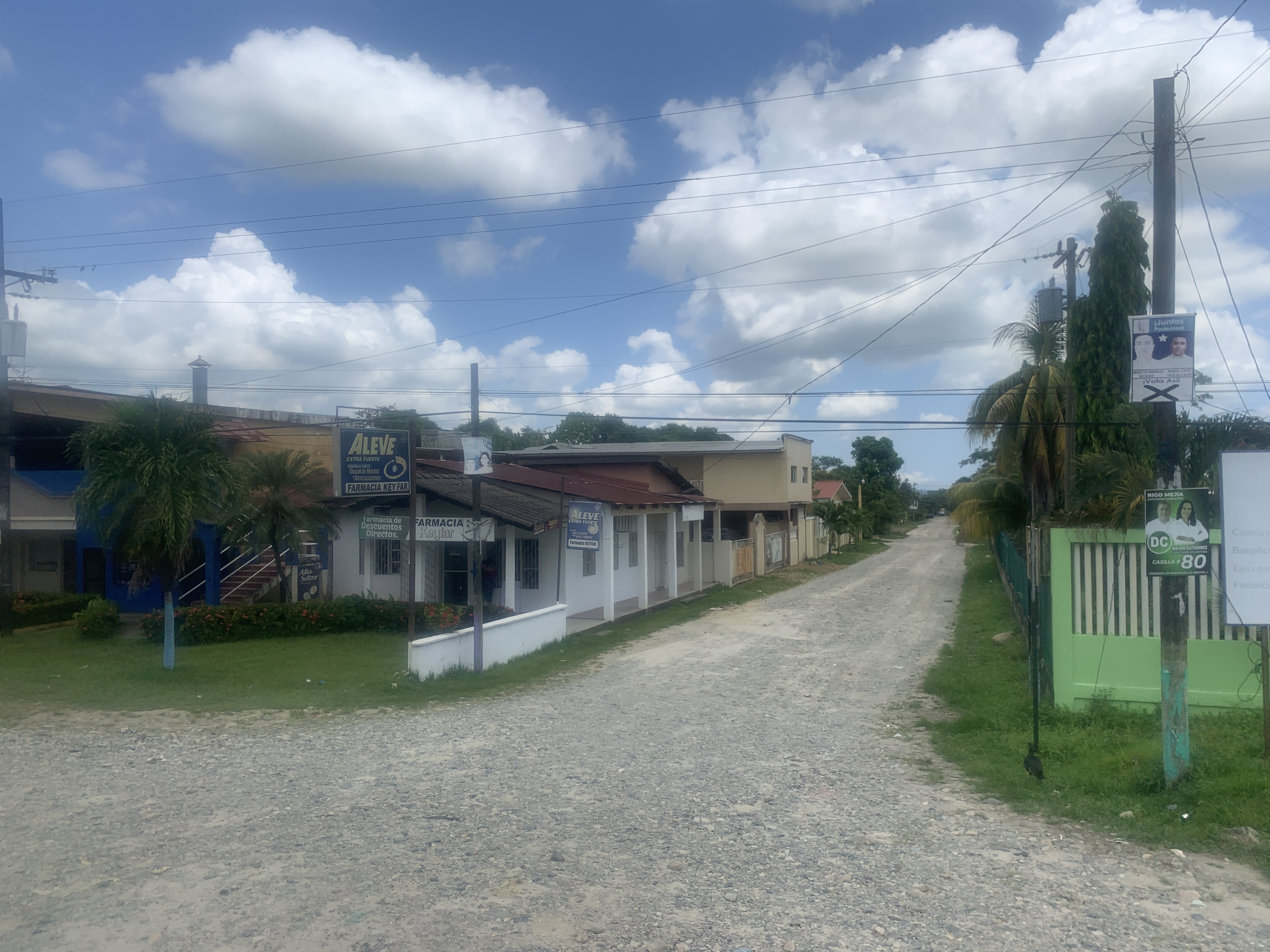
San Juan Pueblo

La Masica (Spanish pronunciation: [la maˈsika]) is a town, with a population of 5,975 (2013 census), and a municipality in the Honduran department of Atlántida. The largest town of the municipality is San Juan Pueblo, with a population of 8,983 (2013 census).
