= San Manuel, Cortés =

San Manuel
- Municipality
- Location within Honduras
- Coordinates: 15°20′N 87°55′W
- Country: Honduras
- Department: Cortés

Area
  - Municipality: 141 km^{2} (54 sq mi)

Population (2023 projection)
  - Municipality: 76,612
  - Density: 543/km^{2} (1,410/sq mi)
  - Urban: 48,443

San Manuel is a town, with a population of 14,260 (2023 calculation), and a municipality in the Honduran department of Cortés.
