= Atlético Limeño =

Honduran football club

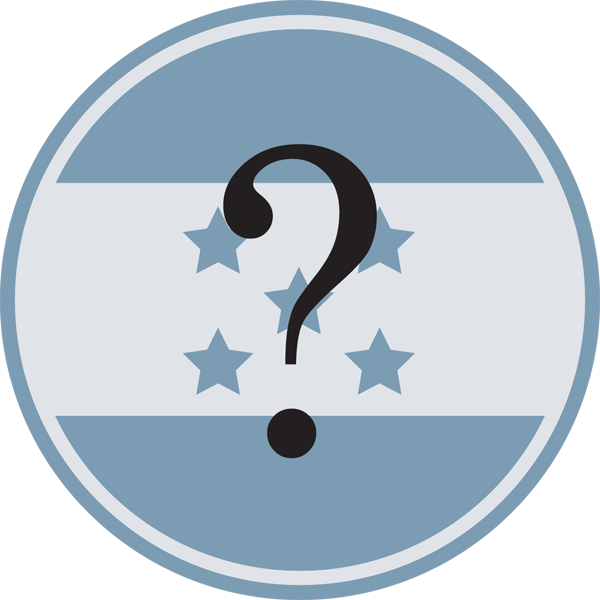
- Full name: Atlético Limeño
- Nickname: Los Limeños
- Ground: Estadio Milton Flores; La Lima, Honduras
- Capacity: 1,000
- Manager: Alejandro Cálix
- League: Liga Mayor de Futbol de Honduras
Home colours	Away colours

Atlético Limeño(Los Limeñosi) is a Honduran football club that plays its home games at Estadio Milton Flores in La Lima, Cortés. The club manager is Alejandro Cálix.
