= Olancho FC =

Honduran football club

- Full name: Olancho Fútbol Club
- Nickname: Potros de Olancho (Foals of Olancho)
- Founded: 2010
- Ground: Estadio Juan Ramón Brevé Vargas; Juticalpa, Olancho
- Capacity: 20,000
- Chairman: Samuel García
- Manager: Humberto Rivera
- League: Liga Nacional
- Website: www.lnphn.com/team/olancho-f-c/
Home colours	Away colours

Olancho Fútbol Club, previously known as C.D. Alianza Becerra, is a Honduran professional football club based in Juticalpa, Olancho, Honduras, that competes in the Liga Nacional de Fútbol Profesional de Honduras.

== History ==
Founded in 2010 as C.D. Alianza Becerra. In 2011, Alianza won promotion to the Honduran second division after beating Mar Azul in the final of the Inter-Regional Centro Sur Oriente championship. In August 2016, the club was re-branded as Olancho F.C. and moved from San Francisco de Becerra to Juticalpa.

== Honours ==
- Liga Nacional de Fútbol de Honduras
  - Runners-up (1): 2022–23 C
- Liga de Ascenso
  - Winners (4): 2015–16 C, 2018–19 C, 2021–22 A, 2021–22 C

== Players ==
=== Current squad ===
As of 12 April, 2026

Note: Flags indicate national team as defined under FIFA eligibility rules; some limited exceptions apply. Players may hold more than one non-FIFA nationality.

No.	Pos.	Nation	Player
1	GK	HON	Harold Fonseca
2	DF	HON	Óscar Almendárez (captain)
3	DF	COL	Juan Lasso
4	DF	HON	Yeer Gutiérrez
5	DF	HON	Deyron Martínez
6	DF	COL	Geisson Perea
7	DF	HON	Diego Rodríguez
8	MF	HON	Henry Gómez
9	FW	PAN	Jorlian Sánchez
10	MF	CRC	Gabriel Leiva
11	MF	HON	Cristian Cálix
12	FW	HON	Érick Andino
13	MF	HON	Fredy Rosales
14	DF	HON	Carlos Argueta
15	MF	HON	José Domínguez
16	DF	HON	Mario Moncada

No.	Pos.	Nation	Player
18	FW	HON	Ángel Villatoro
19	DF	PAR	Edgar Benítez
21	FW	HON	Clayvin Zúñiga
23	MF	HON	Juan Delgado
24	DF	HON	Omar Elvir
25	GK	HON	Gregory Banegas
29	GK	HON	Gerson Argueta
30	FW	HON	Marlon Ramírez
33	DF	HON	Nelson Muñoz
34	MF	HON	Kevin López
35	MF	HON	Stedman Pérez
39	FW	HON	Marlon Garcia
42	DF	HON	Roger Reyes
77	FW	HON	Bryan Lesage

== Managers ==
Name	Dates
(Honduras) Róger Espinoza	2016-2017
(Honduras) Carlos Martínez	2017
(Honduras) Wilson Molina	2018
(Honduras) Wilson Vallecillo	2018
(Honduras) Nerlin Membreño	2019-2020
(Honduras) Róger Espinoza	2020-2021
(Honduras) Humberto Rivera	2021-2023
(Argentina) Mauro De Giobbi	2023
(Honduras) Humberto Rivera	2024-
