= C.A. Pinares =

- Full name: Club Atlético Pinares
- Dissolved: 2012
- Ground: Estadio John F. Kennedy, Nueva Ocotepeque, Honduras
- Capacity: 5,000
- League: Liga de Ascenso
Home colours

Club Atlético Pinares was a Honduran association football club, based in Nueva Ocotepeque in the department of Ocotepeque.

== History ==
They won promotion to the Liga de Ascenso in summer 2010.

=== Comayagua FC ===
In July 2012, the Honduran football arbitration court (Tribunal de Arbitraje de Fútbol) set due the accumulated debts of second division Hispano of Comayagua, which had reached almost one million lempiras (at the time 40,000 EUR / 31,500 GBP / US$51,000) to be paid within five days. This target proved out of scope for the club. Therefore, management decided to dissolve Hispano and purchase the franchise of Atlético Pinares and rebrand it as Comayagua F.C.

== Achievements ==
- Liga de Ascenso

Winners (1): 2019–20 A
