= Estadio León Gómez =

Football stadium in Honduras

Coordinates: 15.779845°N 87.450421°W

- Interactive map of Estadio León Gómez
- Full name: Estadio León Gómez
- Location: Tela, Honduras
- Owner: Tela Municipality
- Capacity: 3,000
- Surface: grass

Construction
- Opened: 1985

Tenants
- Tela Timsa (1985–1991); Petrotela (1991–1994); Parrillas One (2013–present)

Estadio León Gómez is a football stadium in Tela, Honduras. It is currently used mostly for football matches. The stadium holds 3,000 spectators.
