= Siguatepeque =

- Municipality
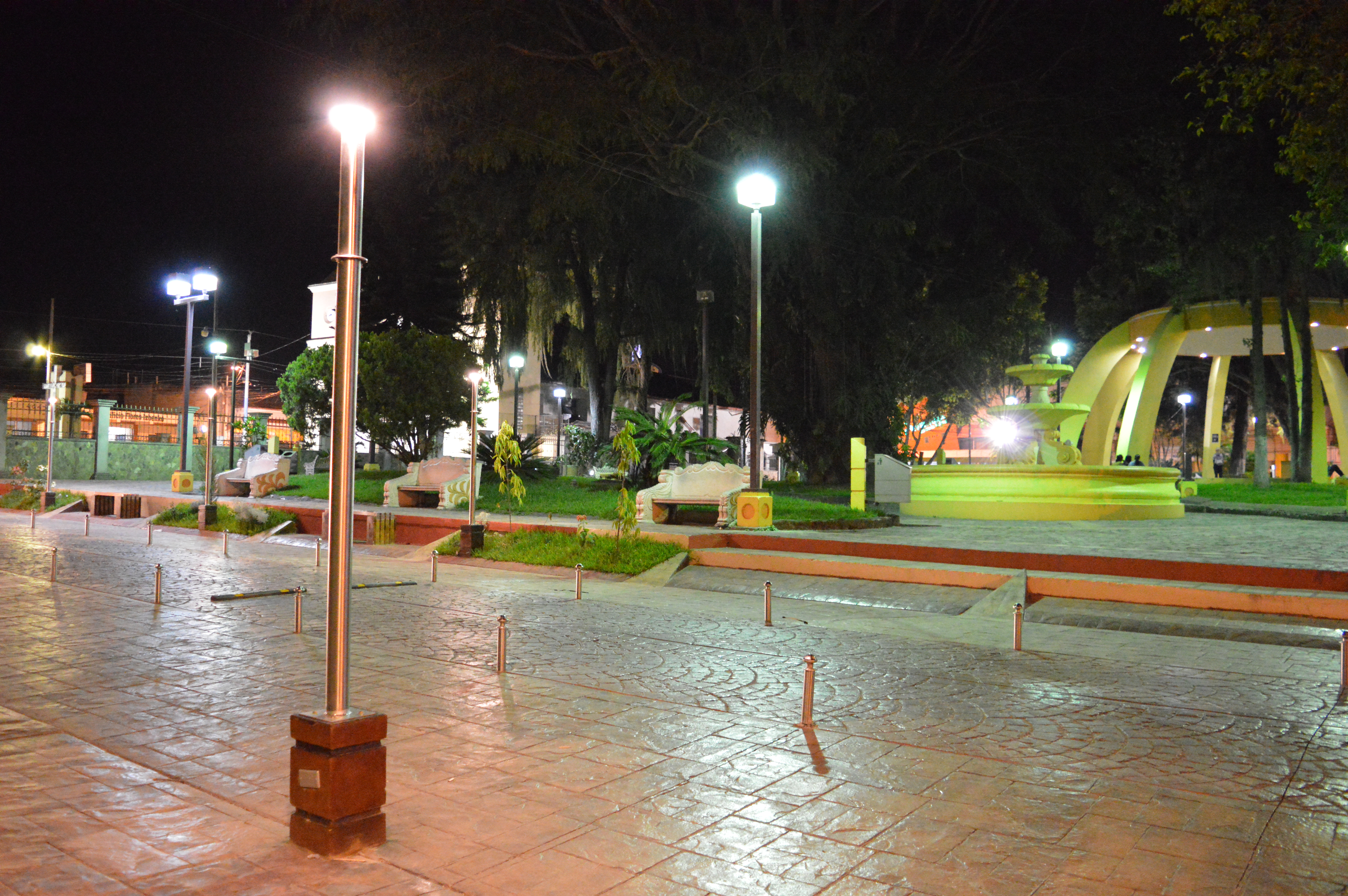

- Location within Honduras
- Coordinates: 14°36′N 87°50′W
- Country: Honduras
- Department: Comayagua
- Founded: 1689

Area
  - Municipality: 151.4 sq mi (392.2 km^{2})
- Elevation: 3,583 ft (1,092 m)
- Highest elevation: 4,460 ft (1,360 m)
- Lowest elevation: 3,410 ft (1,040 m)

Population (2023 projection)
  - Municipality: 127,468
  - Density: 841.8/sq mi (325.0/km^{2})
  - Urban: 94,480
- Climate: Cwa
- Website: municipalidaddesiguatepeque.com

Siguatepeque (Spanish pronunciation: [siɣwateˈpeke]) is a city and municipality in the Honduran department of Comayagua. The city has a population of 79,520 (2023 calculation).

== History ==
Founded by the Spanish in 1689 as a religious centre for retreats and monastic training, the population of the town grew through the intermarriage of colonists, the indigenous Lencas and the Mexican Nahuatl immigrants. The name Siguatepeque is made up of two words in Nahuatl, Cihuatl: Woman and Tepec:Mount, the mount of women. Siguatepeque is located approximately 1,066 metres (3,497 ft) above the sea level. In 1861, the town became a municipality in its own right, and a city in 1926.

== Geography ==
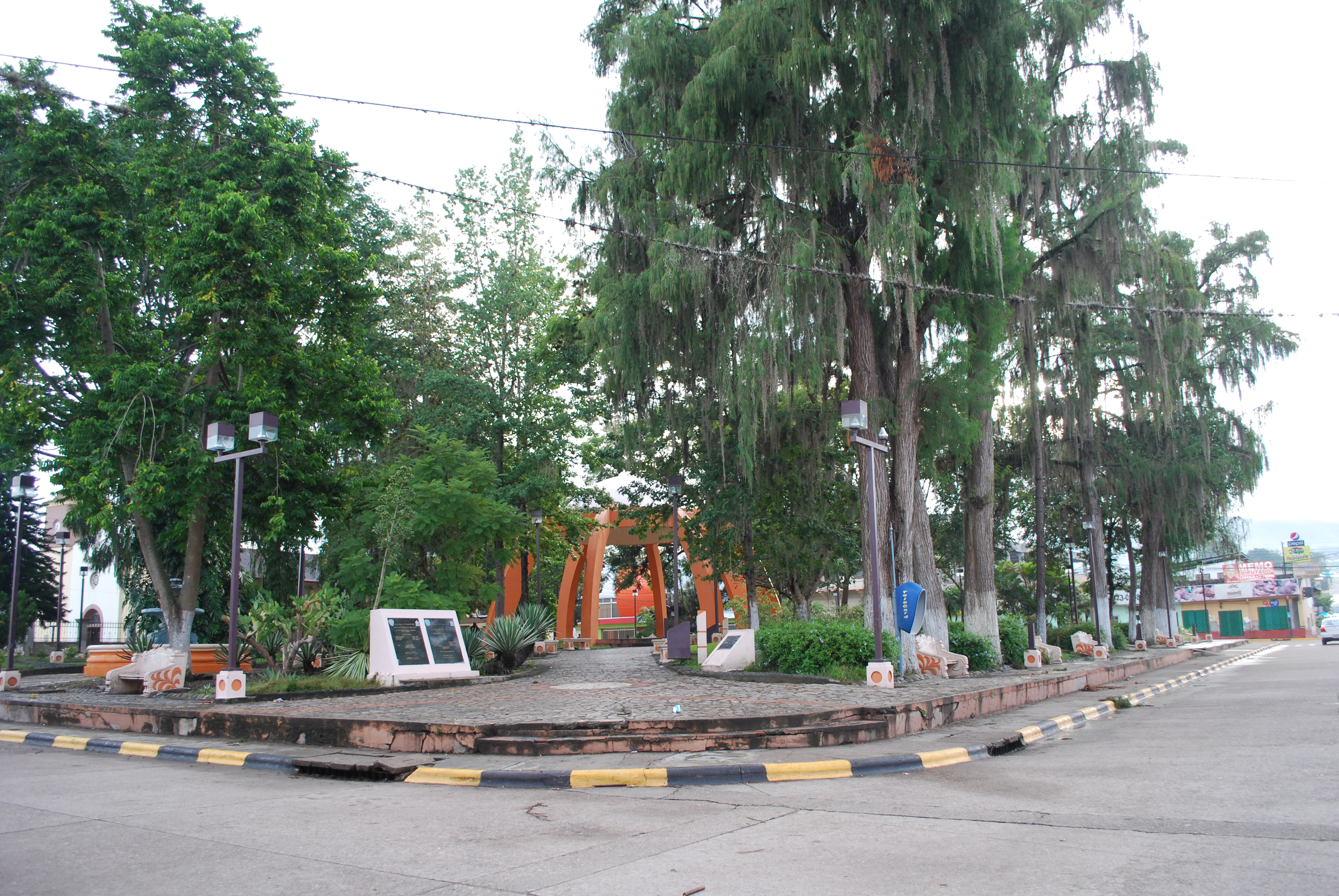
Central park in Siguatepeque

Siguatepeque, is situated 1100 metres above sea level and located in the central mountains of Honduras. It can be described as a garden town.

== Economy ==
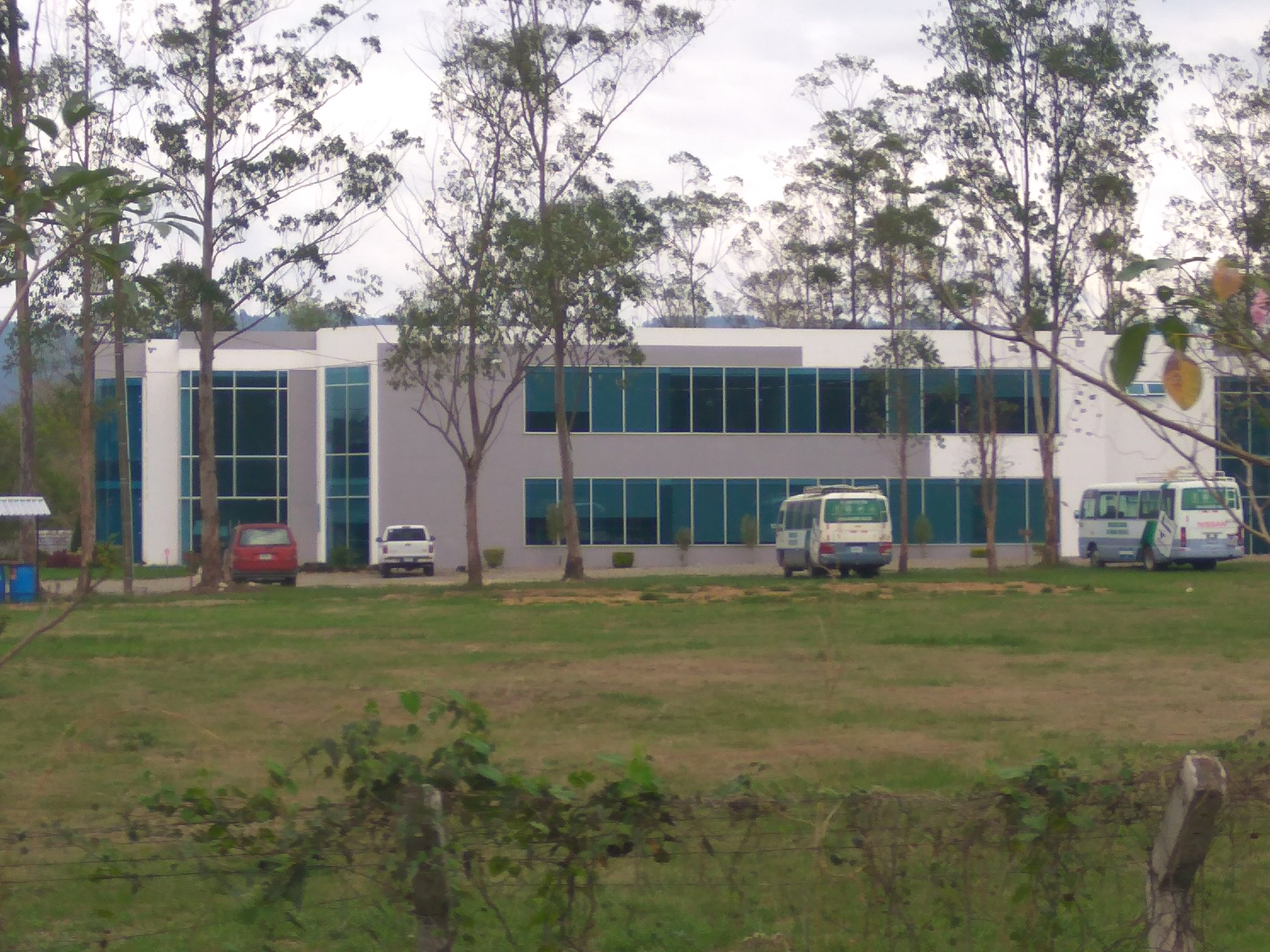
The National University of Forestry Science (UNACIFOR)

The rural region is primarily dedicated to farm and forest enterprises. Building on its natural attractions and beauty, the region has opened itself up to eco-tourism, with Siguatepeque functioning as a base for visitors making trips to destinations within central Honduras. The National University of Forestry Science (UNACIFOR) provides training for students from all of Latin America.

== Travel ==
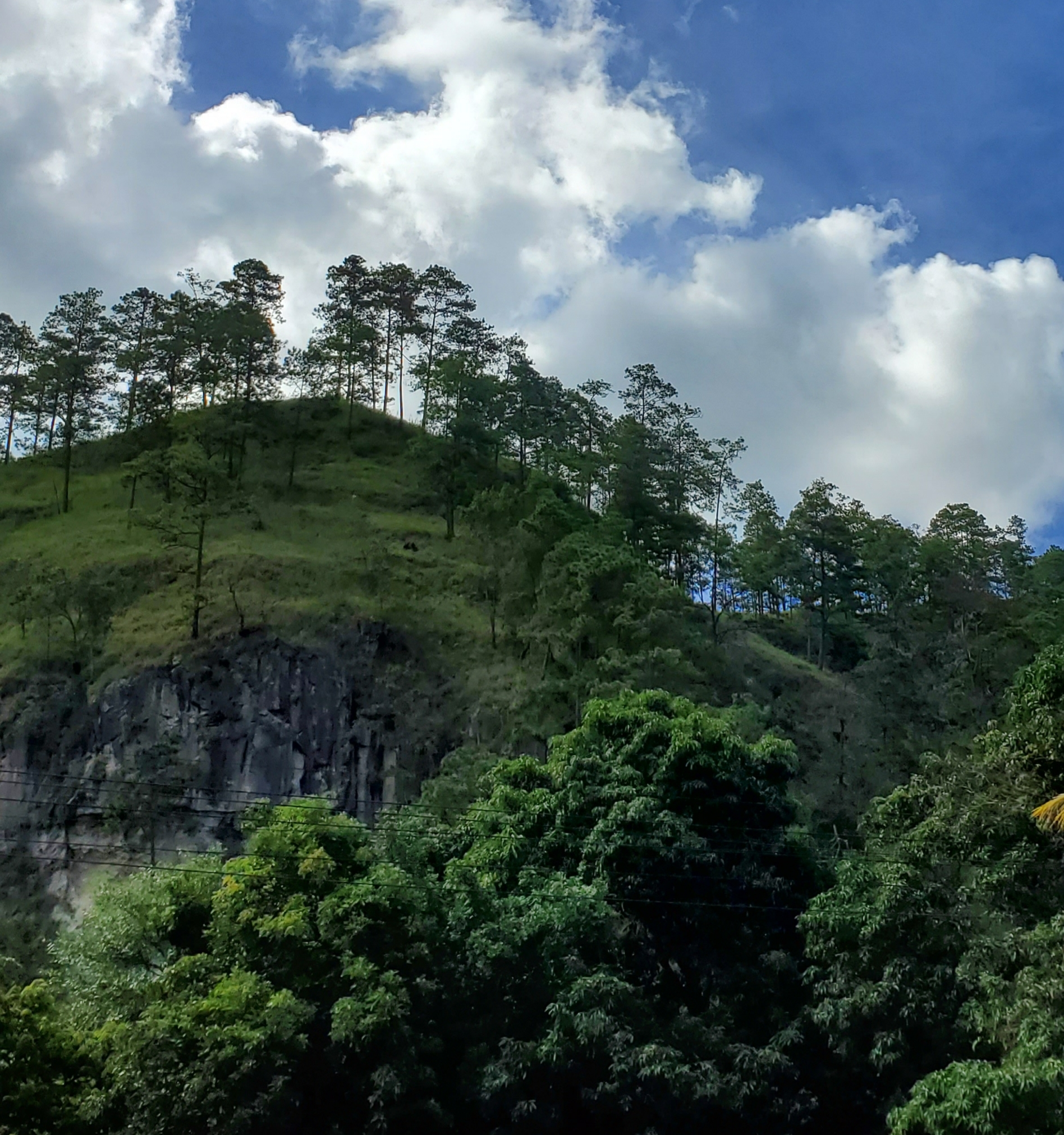
Forest in the city

Located almost exactly halfway between Honduras' two largest cities of San Pedro Sula and Tegucigalpa, Siguatepeque is easy to reach—the town is two hours travel from either city. It is a stopping point for rest and refreshment for Honduran and international inter-city traffic, which has spurred a proliferation of highway restaurants and gas stations. The easiest and cheapest way to travel to and from Siguatepeque is by bus, from Tegucigalpa regional bus services serving San Pedro Sula, Santa Barbara, El Progreso, Tela, Santa Rosa de Copan, La Esperanza, La Ceiba, or any other town beyond Siguatepeque to the north. Many travellers prefer to use the direct bus services between San Pedro Sula and Tegucigalpa, served by Empresa Saenz, Empresa El Rey, and Hedman Alas bus companies. The direct bus service connecting Tegucigalpa is Empresas Unidas. For travel to La Esperanza, buses travel to the turnoff about 4 km from town centre, where other buses from there will travel onwards to the Lenca highlands.

== Climate ==
The climate is humid subtropical climate (Köppen Cwa). mild. There are three seasons. During the wet and fairly cool season between May and November, enough rain falls in the area to ensure luxurious vegetation, while it escapes the excessive humidity of the far hotter and wetter lowland areas. A cooler interlude (November to February) provides seasonal contrast, with temperatures occasionally down to 8 °C (40 °F) as cold fronts enter from the north. This is followed by a dry season (February to May), with temperatures achieving a pleasantly warm peak of 32 °C (95 °F). Cool winds flow down from the local Calanterique forest and from the immense Cordillera Montecillos, a Biological Reserve on the southern edge of the valley. Even in the hot season air conditioning is unnecessary, with a fan almost always being enough. In the winter heating is rarely needed.

Climate data for El Socorro, Siguatepeque, Honduras
Month	Jan	Feb	Mar	Apr	May	Jun	Jul	Aug	Sep	Oct	Nov	Dec	Year
Record high °C (°F)	30.2 (86.4)	34.5 (94.1)	35.5 (95.9)	35.6 (96.1)	35.9 (96.6)	34.5 (94.1)	34.9 (94.8)	34.9 (94.8)	33.2 (91.8)	33.8 (92.8)	31.9 (89.4)	29.8 (85.6)	35.9 (96.6)
Mean daily maximum °C (°F)	23.0 (73.4)	26.0 (78.8)	28.0 (82.4)	29.0 (84.2)	29.0 (84.2)	27.0 (80.6)	27.0 (80.6)	27.0 (80.6)	27.0 (80.6)	25.0 (77.0)	24.0 (75.2)	22.0 (71.6)	26.2 (79.1)
Daily mean °C (°F)	17.4 (63.3)	18.8 (65.8)	20.0 (68.0)	22.5 (72.5)	23.4 (74.1)	22.4 (72.3)	22.0 (71.6)	21.0 (69.8)	21.0 (69.8)	19.7 (67.5)	19.0 (66.2)	17.2 (63.0)	20.4 (68.7)
Mean daily minimum °C (°F)	13.9 (57.0)	13.9 (57.0)	13.9 (57.0)	15.0 (59.0)	16.2 (61.2)	18.0 (64.4)	17.7 (63.9)	17.2 (63.0)	17.2 (63.0)	16.4 (61.5)	15.0 (59.0)	13.9 (57.0)	15.4 (59.7)
Average precipitation mm (inches)	39.9 (1.57)	20.2 (0.80)	21.1 (0.83)	48.6 (1.91)	103.5 (4.07)	118.4 (4.66)	210.0 (8.27)	215.0 (8.46)	205.6 (8.09)	145.1 (5.71)	76.3 (3.00)	71.0 (2.80)	1,274.7 (50.17)
Average precipitation days (≥ 1.0 mm)	6	5	3	4	9	16	15	15	16	12	9	8	118
Source: WeatherSpark(https://es.weatherspark.com/y/13741/Clima-promedio-en-El-Socorro-Honduras-durante-todo-el-a%C3%B1o)

== Amenities ==
The town is at the centre of a regional vegetable and fruit production area, ensuring a year-round supply of produce. The town has good shopping facilities, and the stores are filled with local and Central American products, as well as imported items.

Amenities in Siguatepeque include a large swimming pool, an acupuncture centre, a private hospital, two cinemas and numerous restaurants. The town offers several bilingual schools up to college level, as well as the new Catholic University.

== Medical ==
The Evangelical Hospital attracts clients from throughout Honduras. Dozens of private general and specialist clinics operate here, in particular El Carmen Medical Center, Hospital Las Mercedes, as well as dental clinics. For alternative therapies, the Hospital de Acupuntura (located in Barrio Macaruya) offers acupuncture, dentistry, herbal medicines, sauna and massage.
