= Tela =

- Municipality
- Triunfo de la Cruz
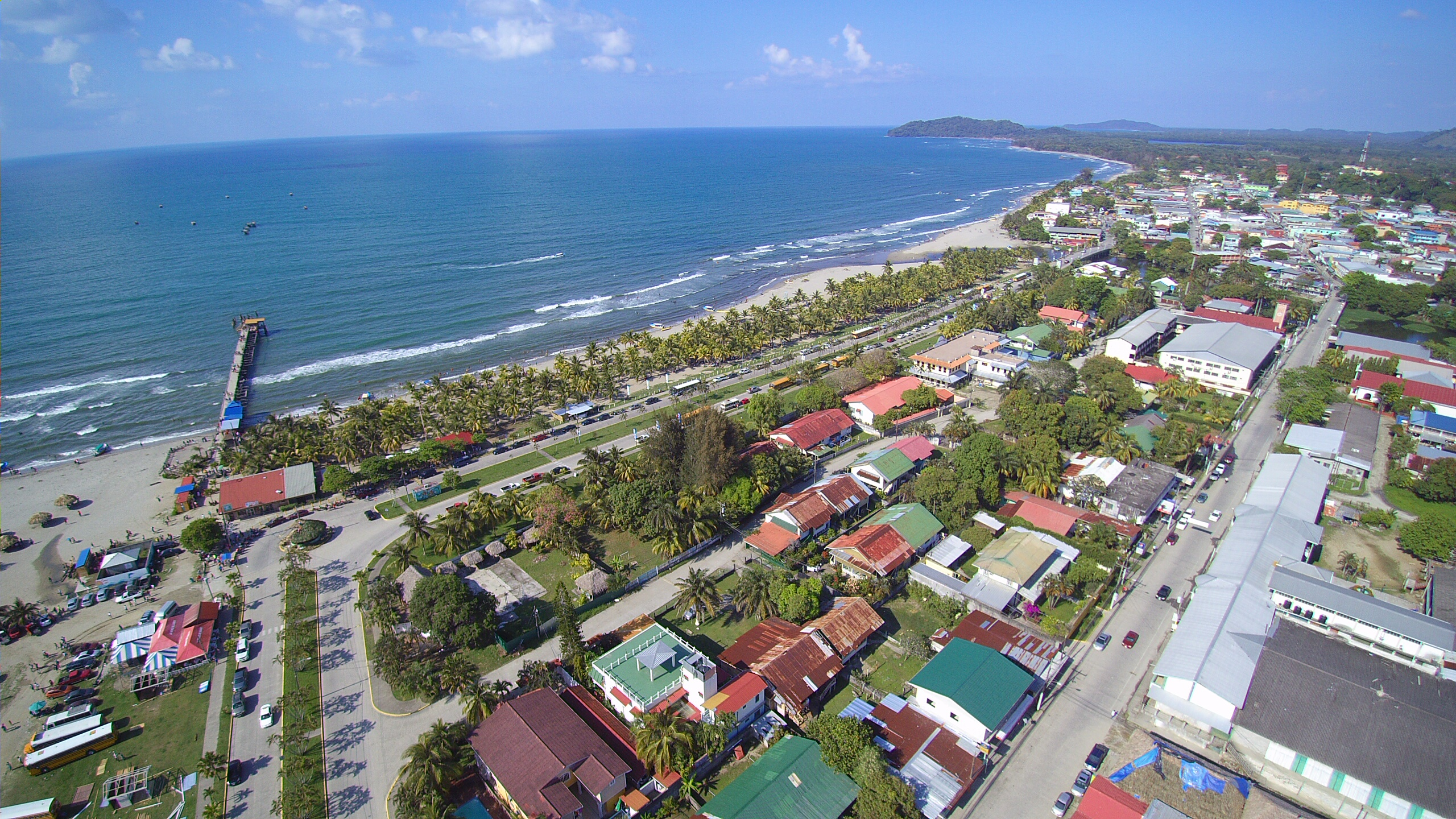
- Town of Tela in 2017

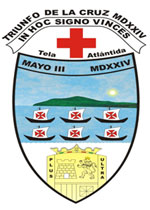
- Coat of arms

- Location within Honduras
- Coordinates: 15°47′N 87°28′W
- Country: Honduras
- Department: Atlántida
- Founded: 2 June 1876; 150 years ago
- Founder: Cristobal de Olid

Government
  - Mayor: Ricardo Cálix Ruiz (PN)

Area
  - Municipality: 1,156 km^{2} (446 sq mi)
- Elevation: 3 m (9.8 ft)

Population (2023 projection)
  - Municipality: 110,255
  - Density: 95.38/km^{2} (247.0/sq mi)
  - Urban: 58,523
- Time zone: UTC−06:00 (CST)
- Postal code: 31301

Tela is a town, with a population of 39,920 (2023 calculation), and a municipality in Honduras on the northern Caribbean coast. It is located in the department of Atlantida.

== History ==
=== Colonial era ===
Tela was founded by the Spanish conquistador Cristóbal de Olid on 3 May 1524; 502 years ago, near an indigenous town, Tehuacán, ruled by a cacique named Cucumba, which had a very good source of clean water, food and medicinal plants. Olid named his town Triunfo de la Cruz (Triumph of the Cross), as it was founded on this Catholic holy day. The name Triunfo de la Cruz still refers to a small promontory in the bay. There are historians who say that the origin of the name is a contraction of Tetela, which in the Nahuat language means "land of hills and craggy mountains." Tela, like other towns on the northern Honduras (Atlantic) coast, was part of the Western Caribbean Zone and although there was a light Spanish presence was connected powerfully to the world of that zone. Thus, English privateers and later pirates frequently operated in the area, and independent or nearly independent indigenous groups also frequented the area. At the end of the 16th century, Tela Bay was frequented by buccaneers who roamed the Caribbean Sea, looking for ways to attack the Spanish schooners that hauled fortunes in precious metals and stones, from Trujillo, Puerto Cortés, Havana, and other Atlantic ports.

In 1797, the English exiled the Garifuna, a group of Afro-Carib origin from St Vincent to the island of Roatan. Later they were moved to Trujillo and from there they are migrated along the coast. In 1808, they settled in Tela where they founded their own community. One of these communities was east of the El Triunfo hills, which they named Triunfo de la Cruz and another west of town named San Juan.

=== Republican era ===
In the political division of 1825, Tela was part of the department of Yoro, and in 1876 was classified as a municipality. With the creation of the department of Cortés, 4 June 1893, Tela became part of Cortés. Subsequently, on 17 July 1894, it was reassigned to the department of Yoro, but in 1902, it was incorporated in the department of Atlántida. The port of Tela was given city status in March 1927.

Between 1880 and the mid-20th century, the economy was based on the cultivation and production of bananas and by 1912, the government started giving grants to nationals and foreigners who wanted to promote the local economy, thus beginning the golden age of banana production in Honduras.

==== Tela Under the United fruit company ====
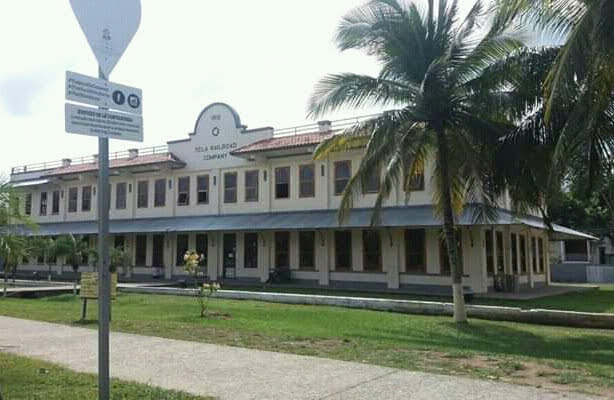
Administrative and warehouse building built in 1918 by the Tela Railroad Company, and used until 1977–78 when the administrative operations were relocated to La Lima. The building has been restored and is currently a museum.

Tela became an important port in 1914 as headquarters of the Tela Railroad Company, a subsidiary of the United Fruit Company whose Honduran headquarters were there until 1970. The company brought in many labourers for the railroad and then for the banana industry as it expanded its production in Honduras. Many of these workers were African-descended people from the English-speaking Caribbean, especially Jamaica and Belize, and introduced the English language and Protestant (especially Methodist and Anglican) churches to the town.

The United Fruit Company built a new town, called Tela Nueva, outside the older town for its employees. The town, which was carefully planned was segregated by race, and the best housing (single family homes of varying size) was in the "White Zone" (later called the "American Zone") in which only Euro-American employees lived. The remaining workers lived in barracks type houses outside the zone. The town included an excellent hospital, good schools, and a golf course. Some of these units remain today as part of a hotel complex.

Local mestizo and Spanish speaking workers in the town resented the presence of West Indians, who often held the best jobs, and because they spoke English were more able to get even service jobs in the US controlled company. In time the government of Honduras took up an anti-West Indian line, which was accompanied in many cases, by racist literature and cartoons that contrasted the African descended Caribbean workers with the mestizo Hondurans. In 1929 and again in 1934 immigration laws were hardened, making it difficult for English speakers or non-Hondurans to enter the country or remain there, and between 1930 and 1939, hundreds of Caribbean people were deported, greatly decreasing the English speaking and African descended population of the town.

In 1930 floods ruined the banana industry, broke bridges and closed railroads, causing whole plantations to cease operations. Tela declined somewhat after this disaster, but gradually recovered.

==== Mid 20th century ====
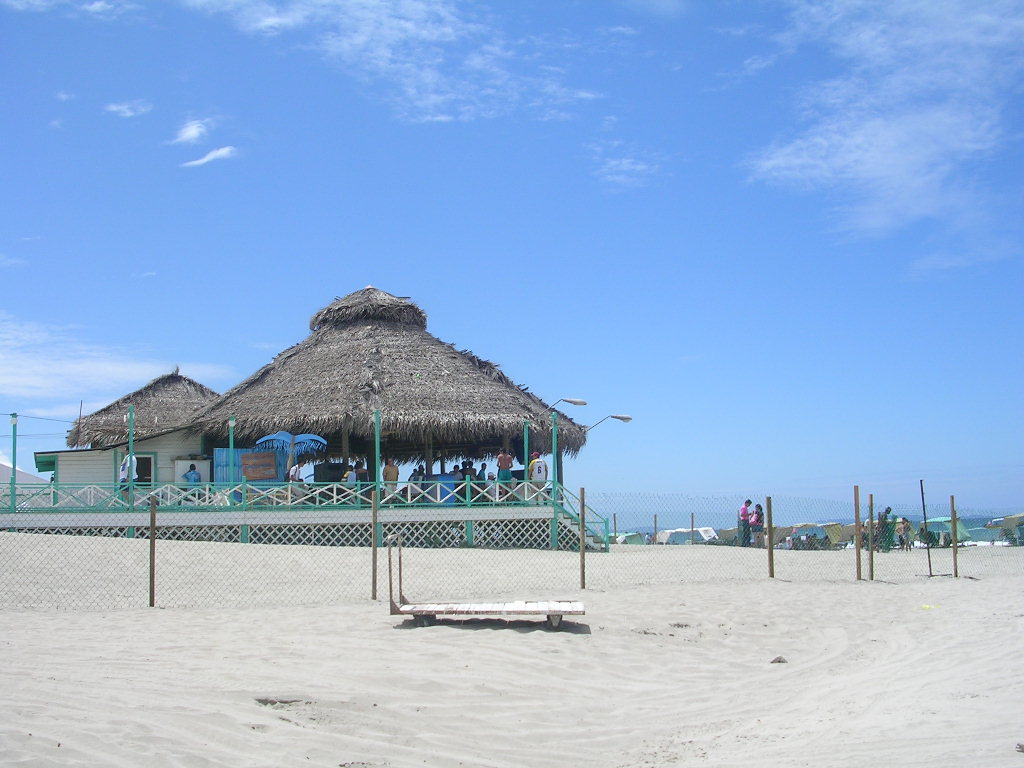
Tela is a popular destination for Hondurans on holidays, here the famous bar "El Delfin" in the Tela beach

Tela was the epicentre of the 1954 General Strike, which began as a wildcat action among the poorer workers, and soon spread through the north of Honduras, but the English speaking Caribbean workers, occupying higher positions in the company were lukewarm in their support or even openly hostile to the workers. In the aftermath of the strike, which led to major concessions to workers, the English speaking community was subject to retaliation and many left the region, often immigrating to the United States or Canada, or to the Caribbean countries from which they or their ancestors had originated.

The town's long dock burned in 1994. A hasty replacement, opened in January 1995, collapsed due to high winds, and the remnant is now used for fishing.

The town had an extensive railyard in which trains were used to run all the way out to the dock. Passenger trains still run twice a week from Tela to Puerto Cortés, the only routes in the country still served by trains.

== Garifuna villages nearby ==
Tela is one of various towns on the Caribbean Coast of Central America with many Garifuna communities nearby. Heading east along the beach from Tela, one first comes to Ensenada aldea, and then, beyond Punta del Triunfo de la Cruz, to the aldea of Triunfo de la Cruz; to the west along the beach, are San Juan aldea, which bleeds into Tela's western edge, then Tornabé aldea, and 10 miles (16 km) or so beyond Tornabé, the tiny caserio of Miami.

== Culture ==
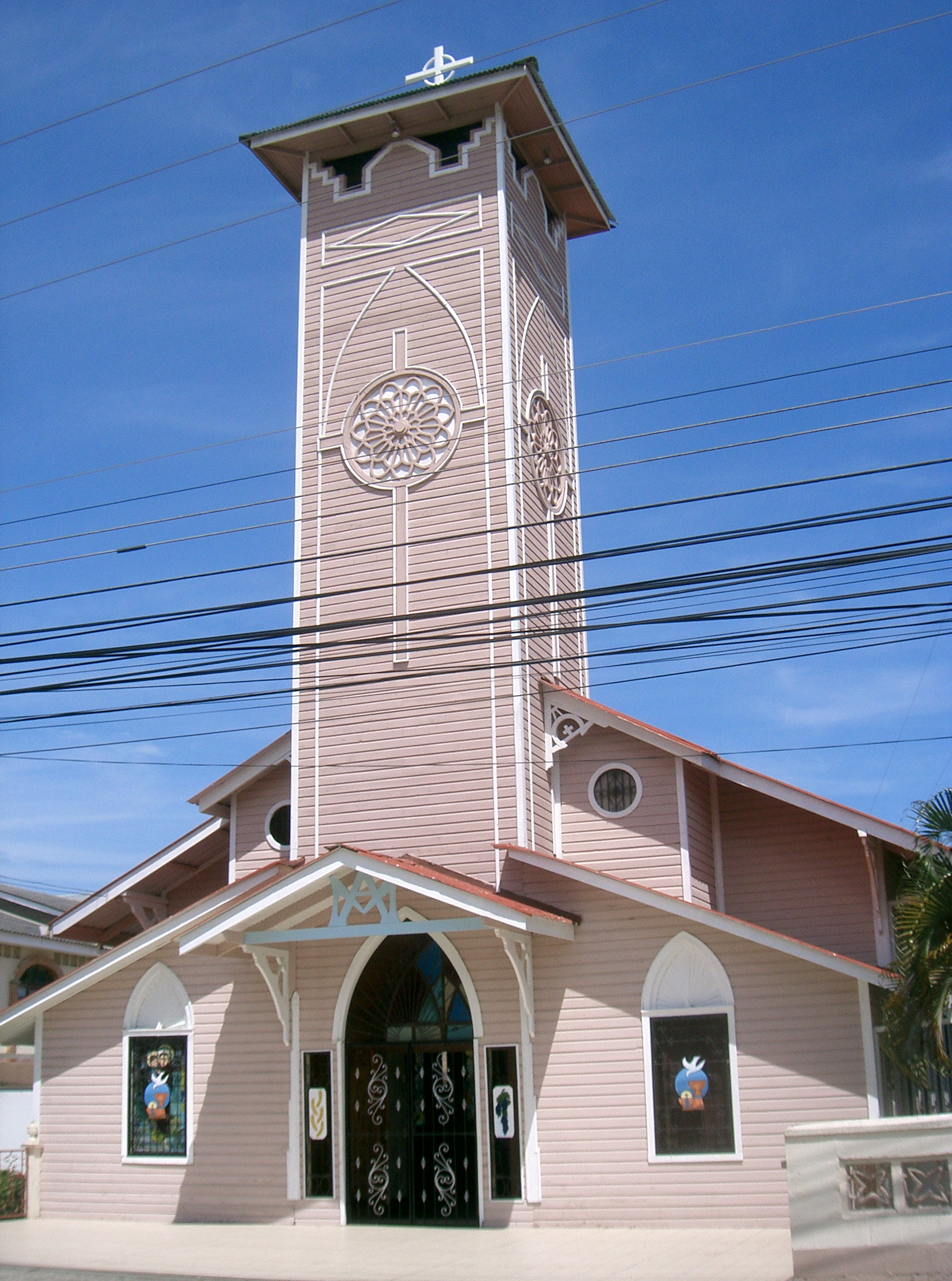
San Antonio Church.

Tela's patron saint is San Antonio. Every June, the town holds its festival in honour of San Antonio, with parades and parties throughout the week.

Tela is one of the most popular beach destinations for Honduran beachgoers. It draws especially well in Holy Week, the week between Palm Sunday and Easter, when many tens of thousands of Hondurans crowd into town to party, drink, lie on the beach and swim in the Caribbean.

Most Teleños are Catholic; the town's main Catholic church is Iglesia San Antonio, just across the river from downtown Tela. There are other smaller Catholic churches throughout town. There are many other denominations represented in town, however, including the Holy Spirit Episcopal Church, a LDS Church and a large Evangelical church just off the beach downtown, colloquially known in Tela as the "Jumping Church".

== Infrastructure ==
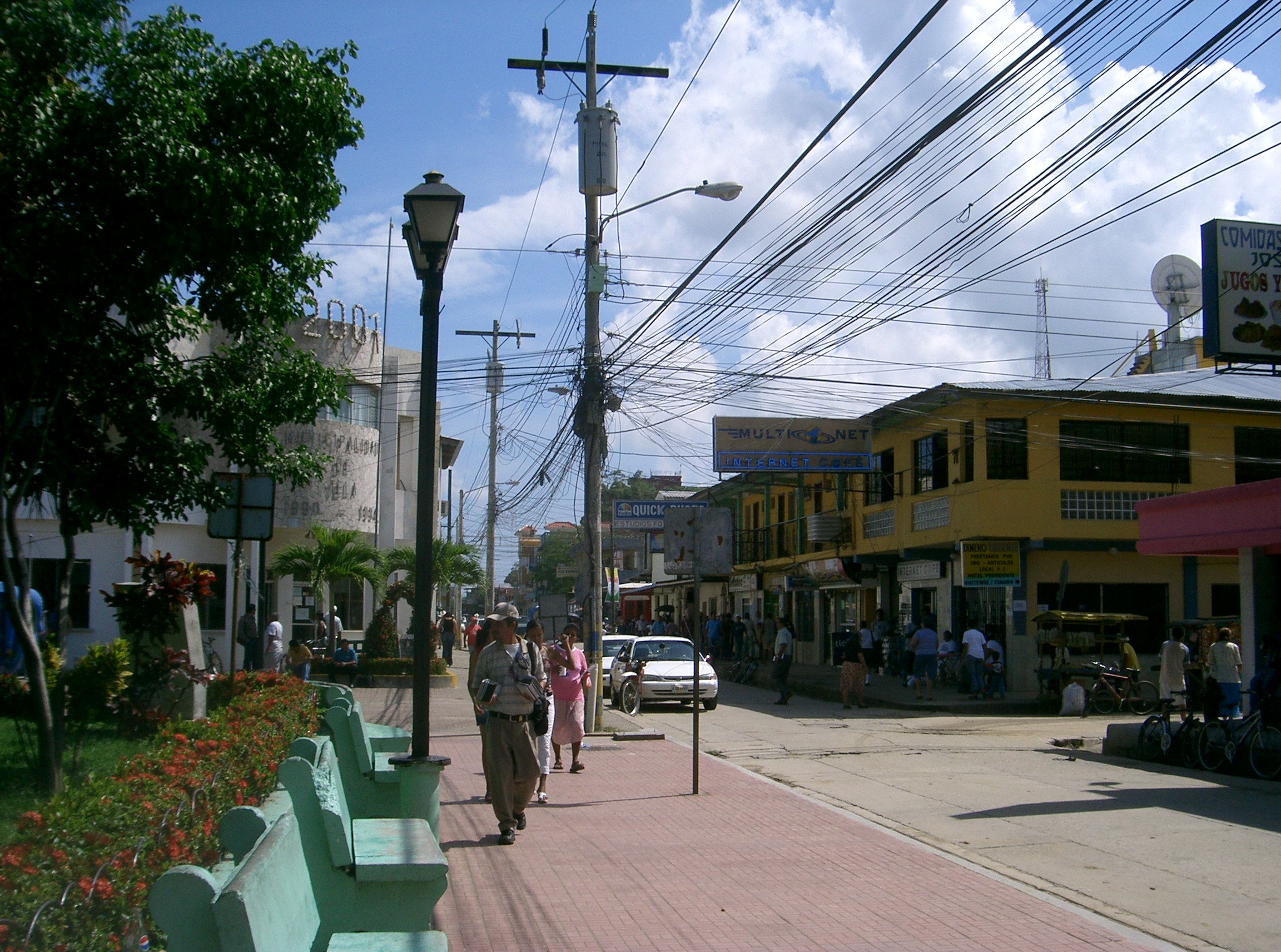
Tela Business district and central park in 2008.

Tela has paved roads throughout the downtown area. Many of the outlying areas have paved main thoroughfares; smaller side streets are generally dirt roads in the town outsides.

Virtually all buildings in and around the aldea of Tela have running water, flush toilets and electricity. Many farther aldeas and caserios have no running water or electricity; some are made up entirely of bamboo or thatch huts.

Downtown Tela's main street is a busy business district. There is a well stocked grocery store, several small department stores, a number of hardware stores, many restaurants, internet cafes, bars, banks, pool halls and hotels, a laundry, a bakery, and a coffin maker's workshop. The town is well served by doctors, dentists, lawyers and veterinarians. The town also has its own small lumberyard. Two blocks off the town park, there is a block-square market—half open and half enclosed—selling fresh vegetables, fruit and meat, brought in daily from farms in the surrounding countryside; fisherman bring in fresh fish daily to the market as well to many restaurants.

In addition to the downtown grocery store and the town market, in the barrios, nearly every street corner has its own "pulpería"—a small shop in the front of a family house, which sells milk, eggs, juice, beans and other everyday needs to the neighbourhood.

There is a public school in Tela, and at least six smaller private schools, three of which are bilingual, teaching English along with Spanish.

== Climate ==
Tela has a tropical rainforest climate, also known as an equatorial climate, is a tropical climate usually (but not always) found along the equator. Tropical rainforest climate is a type of tropical climate in which there is no dry season. The Köppen Climate Classification subtype for this climate is "Af" (Tropical Rainforest Climate).

Climate data for Tela
| Month | Jan | Feb | Mar | Apr | May | Jun | Jul | Aug | Sep | Oct | Nov | Dec | Year |
|---|---|---|---|---|---|---|---|---|---|---|---|---|---|
| Record high °C (°F) | 30.3 (86.5) | 31.5 (88.7) | 33.8 (92.8) | 34.6 (94.3) | 34.0 (93.2) | 33.7 (92.7) | 32.8 (91.0) | 32.8 (91.0) | 33.2 (91.8) | 32.4 (90.3) | 31.4 (88.5) | 30.7 (87.3) | 34.6 (94.3) |
| Mean daily maximum °C (°F) | 27.5 (81.5) | 28.1 (82.6) | 29.7 (85.5) | 30.6 (87.1) | 32.1 (89.8) | 31.8 (89.2) | 31.3 (88.3) | 31.3 (88.3) | 31.2 (88.2) | 29.8 (85.6) | 28.8 (83.8) | 27.5 (81.5) | 30.0 (86.0) |
| Daily mean °C (°F) | 23.9 (75.0) | 24.5 (76.1) | 26.0 (78.8) | 27.2 (81.0) | 28.1 (82.6) | 28.2 (82.8) | 27.8 (82.0) | 27.8 (82.0) | 27.6 (81.7) | 26.3 (79.3) | 25.0 (77.0) | 24.3 (75.7) | 26.4 (79.5) |
| Mean daily minimum °C (°F) | 19.5 (67.1) | 19.6 (67.3) | 20.5 (68.9) | 21.8 (71.2) | 23.1 (73.6) | 23.3 (73.9) | 22.7 (72.9) | 22.9 (73.2) | 22.9 (73.2) | 22.1 (71.8) | 21.1 (70.0) | 20.1 (68.2) | 21.6 (70.9) |
| Record low °C (°F) | 16.0 (60.8) | 15.8 (60.4) | 16.9 (62.4) | 18.2 (64.8) | 19.8 (67.6) | 21.4 (70.5) | 20.5 (68.9) | 21.1 (70.0) | 21.4 (70.5) | 19.5 (67.1) | 17.9 (64.2) | 16.5 (61.7) | 15.8 (60.4) |
| Average precipitation mm (inches) | 268.3 (10.56) | 217.8 (8.57) | 122.0 (4.80) | 88.3 (3.48) | 79.9 (3.15) | 148.2 (5.83) | 202.8 (7.98) | 228.4 (8.99) | 247.4 (9.74) | 388.7 (15.30) | 411.6 (16.20) | 421.0 (16.57) | 2,824.4 (111.20) |
| Average precipitation days (≥ 1.0 mm) | 12 | 8 | 5 | 4 | 5 | 9 | 12 | 13 | 12 | 14 | 13 | 13 | 120 |
Source: NOAA

== Sources ==
- Chambers, Glenn Anthony (2010). Race, Nation, and West Indian Immigration to Honduras, 1890–1940. Baton Rouge: Louisiana State University Press. ISBN 978-0-8071-3557-0.
- Harpelle, Ronald (2010). "White Zones: American Enclave Communities of Central America". In Gudmundson, Lowell; Wolfe, Justin (eds.). Blacks and Blackness in Central America: Between Race and Place. Durham: Duke University Press. ISBN 978-0-8223-4787-3.
