= C.D. Aguán =

- Full name: Club Deportivo Aguán
- Nickname(s): Los Leones (The Lions)

C.D. Aguán was a football club in Olanchito, Honduras.

It was one of two prominent football clubs in Olanchito in the 1930s and early 1940s.

Ramón Amaya Amador wrote the 'Hymn of C.D. Aguán'.
