= Tegucigalpa Olympic Village =

Sports complex in Honduras

Coordinates: 14.0908°N 87.1638°W

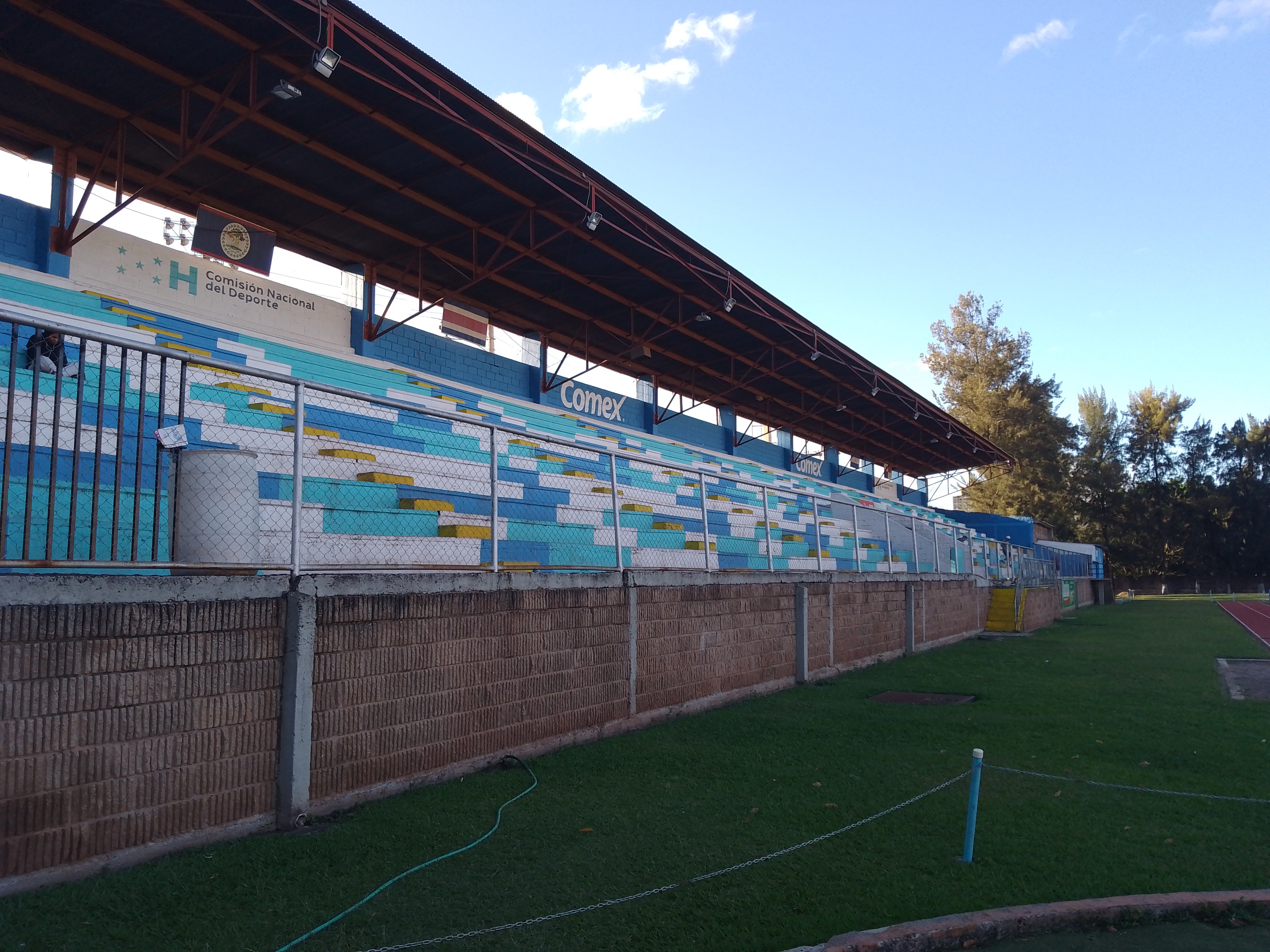
Seats of the Olympic stadium.

The Olympic Village of Tegucigalpa is a sports complex situated in the northeastern part of Tegucigalpa, the capital of Honduras. The Government of Honduras designed the complex to serve as the city's main sports center, and also to provide accommodation for athletes participating in international events. It is located to the north of the Autonomous National University of Honduras. Entry is free of charge and there are facilities for many types of sport. It is owned by the state of Honduras and managed by the National Commission for Sporting Installations (CONAPID), within a monthly budget of 10 million lempiras.

== History ==
The Tegucigalpa Olympic Village was built in 1989, during the presidency of José Azcona del Hoyo. It was designed by various architects and engineers from Tegucigalpa, aiming to modernize the area and to be capable of accommodating the Central American and Caribbean Games.

== Facilities ==
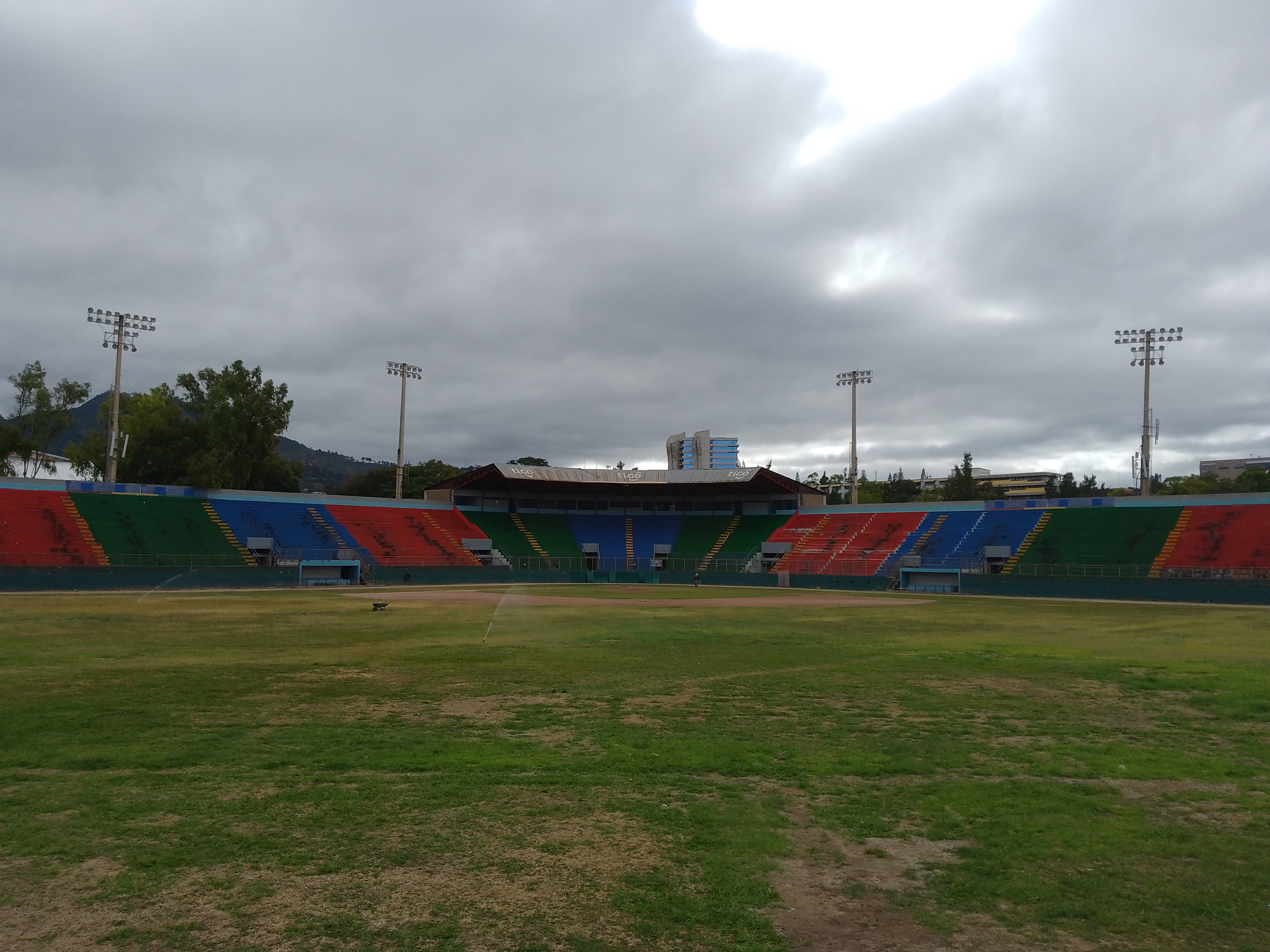
Chochi Sosa Baseball Stadium

The Olympic village includes a variety of facilities with sports equipment, including weights, gymnasiums, an Olympic-size swimming pool, several football pitches, basketball, volleyball, and tennis courts.

=== Structures ===
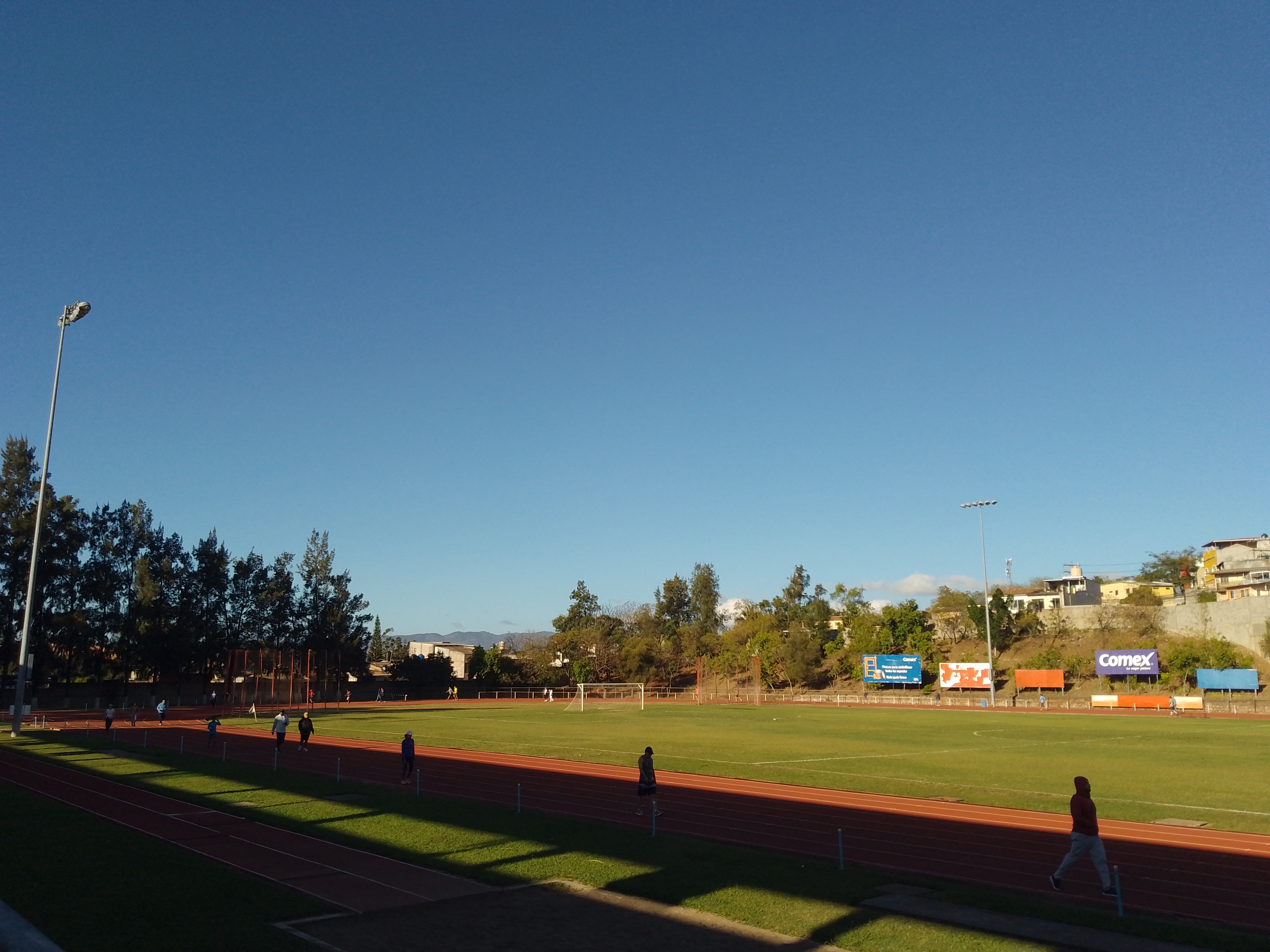
Football field and running track

The buildings of the facility include:

- Swimming pools.
- Gymnasium 1: Area designated to the disciplines of Olympic gymnastics, boxing, table tennis, Muay Thai, Kickboxing and Lima Lama.
- Gymnasium 2: Volleyball, fencing and weightlifting.
- Gymnasium 3: Basketball and martial arts (including Muay Thai)
- Chochi Sosa Baseball Stadium (Estadio Chochi Sosa), 1,500 seats.
- Olympic stadium: football and athletics, 3,000 seats.

=== Sports ===
- Aikido
- Gymnastics
- Basketball
- Handball
- Boxing
- Baseball
- Table tennis
- Fencing
- Weightlifting
- Football
- Tennis
- Karate
- Kung fu
- Taekwondo
- Swimming
- Athletics
- Volleyball
- Wrestling
- Muay thai
- Judo
- Mixed martial arts
- Lima Lama
- Kickboxing

== Access ==
The Olympic Village is open to the public from 4:00 am until 8:00 pm daily. No fee is charged to use the facilities, as the complex is regarded as the property of all Hondurans. It typically receives at least 10,000 visits a day, attracting many walkers and runners as a relatively safe place within the city.

== Maintenance ==
The maintenance of the Olympic Village is the responsibility of CONAPID, using funding of less than 10 million lempiras per month. This funding is derived mainly from rental income and advertising at the Tiburcio Carías Andino Stadium.

The Olympic Village does not collect fees from the public for provision of the installations, although sports organisations do levy a minimal charge to raise funds for participation in international competitions. It has been noted that with the constant increase of the price of all resources, adequate maintenance of the complex would require the government to increase the budgetary allocation by at least 30 million lempiras.

== Renovation ==
CONAPID secured a grant of one million dollars, equivalent to some 20 million lempiras, from the Central American Bank for Economic Integration (BCIE) to renovate the Olympic Village. At present it receives adequate maintenance, with 3.5 million lempiras allocated to its maintenance in 2008.

Germán Duarte, the current supervisor of projects, is engaged with the repair of pitches and the repainting of floors in the three gymnasiums of the sports complex. A new roof has been provided at the Olympic swimming pool, stairways and perimeter fences have been repainted, and several planting areas have been improved.

Further improvements undertaken by CONAPID during 2015, at a cost of 14 million lempiras, included fitting over 300 LED lights, resurfacing all the main roadways, and a new tartan track.

== See also ==
- Sport in Honduras
- Soccer in Honduras
- Basketball in the United States
- Ingenieros Coliseum
