= Football in Honduras =

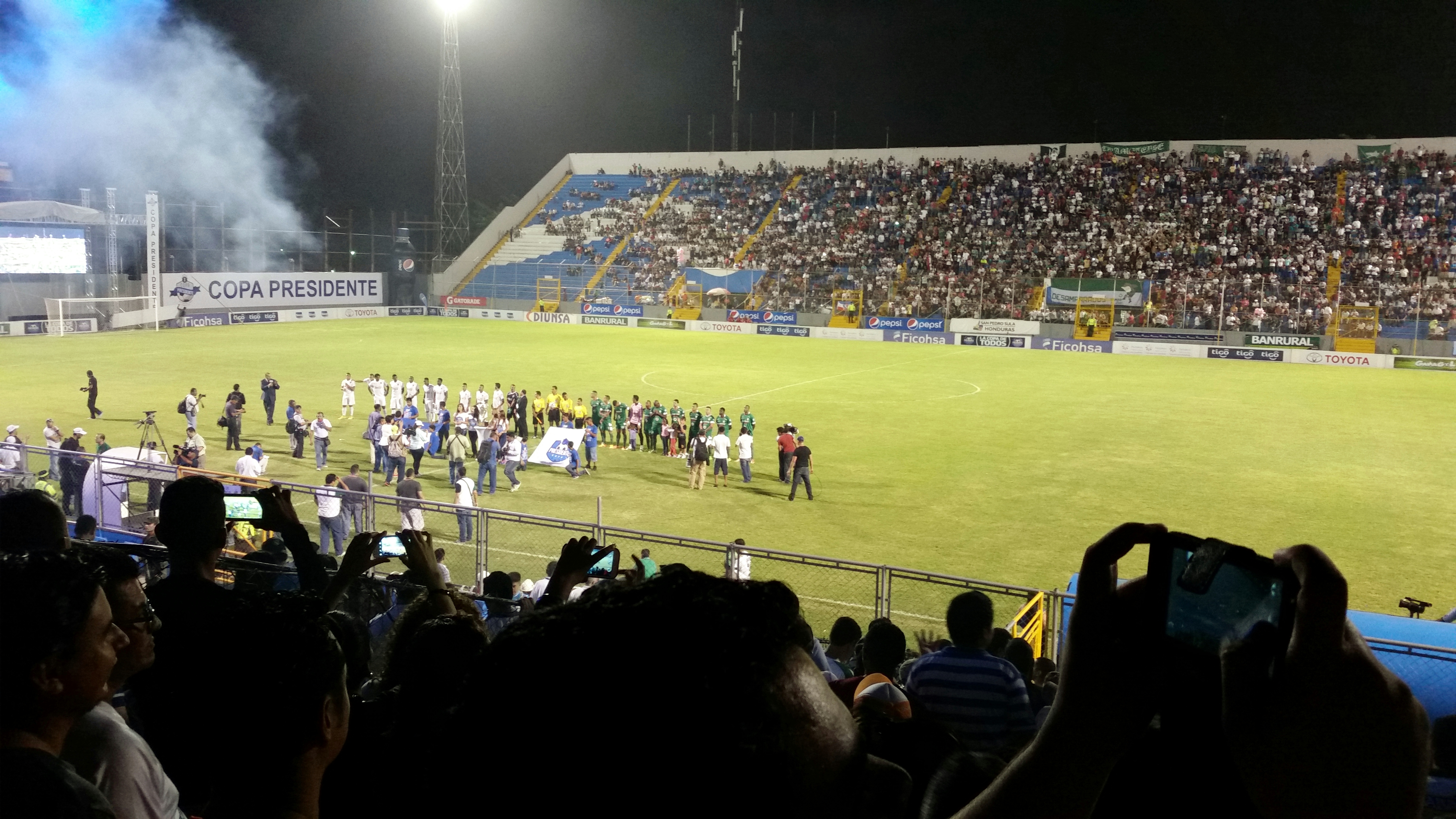
- Olimpia versus Platense
- Country: Honduras
- Governing body: Football Federation of Honduras
- National teams: Men's national team; Women's national team
- First played: 1962

National competitions
- Liga Nacional de Fútbol de Honduras

Club competitions
- Honduran Cup

International competitions
- CONCACAF Champions Cup; CONCACAF Central American Cup; FIFA Club World Cup; CONCACAF Gold Cup (National Team); CONCACAF Nations League (National Team); FIFA World Cup (National Team); CONCACAF Women's Championship (National Team); CONCACAF W Gold Cup (National Team); FIFA Women's World Cup (National Team)

Association football in Honduras is a national sport. It is the most popular sport among Hondurans, becoming popular in the 20th century. Over half of the population in Honduras are reported as interested in football.

Honduras performed memorably in three World Cups, Spain 1982, South Africa 2010, and Brazil 2014. The nation also competes in the Copa América, UNCAF Nations Cup, Olympic Games, and in FIFA U-20 World Cups. Its national team is considered the strongest football team in central America alongside Costa Rica.

== History ==
In the territories that are now Honduras, the Mayans in Copán played the game of Pok-ta-pok in fields within their cities. The game used a ball of rubber. This sport was practiced in the 1000s AD, and it was a predecessor of basketball and football.

There are many accounts of how association football started in Honduras. A newspaper owned by the Ustariz family (French descendants) was delivered by a French ship, staffed almost entirely by an English crew. It arrived on the coasts of Port Cortés in 1896, bringing with them many soccer balls, which they used for fun in their free time every time they came to Honduras. The practice of this new sport attracted the curiosity of the inhabitants of the port, who saw how the English sailors had fun playing football. These sailors encouraged the Hondurans to learn the game, and play along with them.

Luis Fernando, a son of French immigrants, recorded that some merchants in Puerto Cortes had given him a football in 1896, and that football was played in Honduras since then. In 1906, the republic's government hired a Guatemalan professor named Miguel Arcangel to teach football at the Escuela Normal de Varones in Tegucigalpa. Three years later, the Spanish monk Niglia introduced the game at the Instituto Salesiano San Miguel in Comayagua.

By the time Honduran football took its first steps, several countries in Europe and South America already had formed their respective football associations, and others were in process of forming. This growth of associations on a worldwide level, and the marked interest of the "catrachos" by the practice of the soccer, made the government in Honduras, under the control of the president Manuel Bonilla, interested in the sport.

It for that reason that, in 1906, the government hired the services of Miguel Saravia, a Guatemalan, to give football classes for the students of the School of Men of Tegucigalpa. Three years later, Saravia would be joined by his Spanish father, Niglia, to teach football, but this time in the Salesian Institute San Miguel of Comayagüela. Football became popular, especially in higher classes, although it couldn't compete against baseball, which remained the most popular sport until 1917.

The first professional clubs were founded in the early 1900s. The oldest team in Honduran football is Club Deportivo Olimpia. It was founded as a baseball club on 12 June 1912 by the team known as Juventud Olimpica, transforming into a football club later on. Other clubs were founded in Tegucigalpa, such as Lituania, Signos, Trebol, Honduras, Atletico Deportes, La Nueva Era, Colon and Spring. None of them exist now.

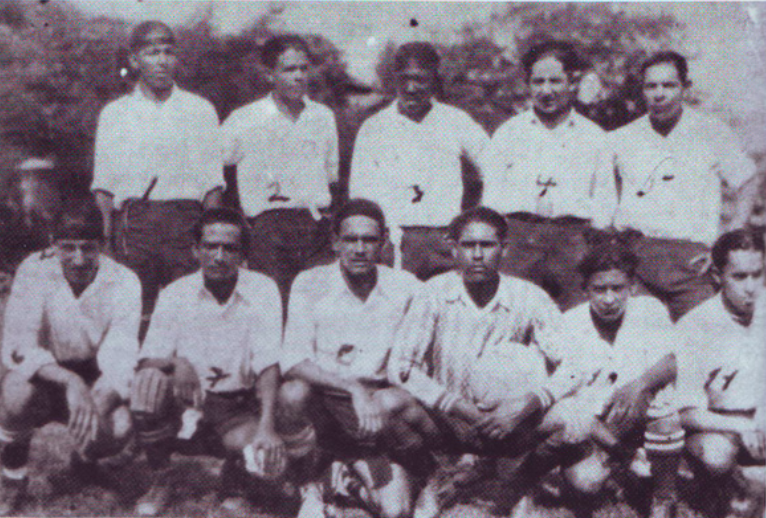
F.C Motagua team in 1928.

After the foundation of the Club Olimpia, football in Honduras was reaching greater levels of growth through the 1920s. It expanded quickly to all corners of the country. In the capital of the country, Sportive Club Motagua was founded in 1928. In San Pedro Sula, the clubs Marathón and Spain were founded in 1925 and 1929 respectively.

Further north, the city of Puerto Cortés saw the foundation of the club Excelsior in 1925, and in La Ceiba a team known as Naco appeared in 1929. In other places around the country, community leaders and football fans followed the example of these clubs and formed local teams.

The Honduras national football team played its debut international match in 1921.

In the second most important city, San Pedro Sula, football began to gain strength only with the foundation of C.D. Marathón. Some contemporary historians say that a club named Club Patria existed before Marathón, but only for a very small time. The president of the Republic, Dr. Miguel Paz Barahona, named the sporting fields Patria Marathón.

In 1928 Club Deportivo Motagua was founded and named after the river Motagua, which was then in dispute between Guatemala and Honduras. A year later in San Pedro Sula, Real España (known since 1977 as Real Club Deportivo España) was founded.

The national association, the National Autonomous Federation of Football of Honduras (FENAFUTH), was founded in 1935 and became affiliated to FIFA in 1946. It was joined by the Liga Nacional de Fútbol Profesional de Honduras in 1964. Together, these two organizations oversee football in Honduras.

There are now about 60 professional and amateur football teams, organized into three national divisions: the Liga Nacional de Fútbol de Honduras, the Liga Nacional de Ascenso de Honduras (promotion league) and the Liga Mayor de Futbol de Honduras (major league).

== Honduran Football Association ==
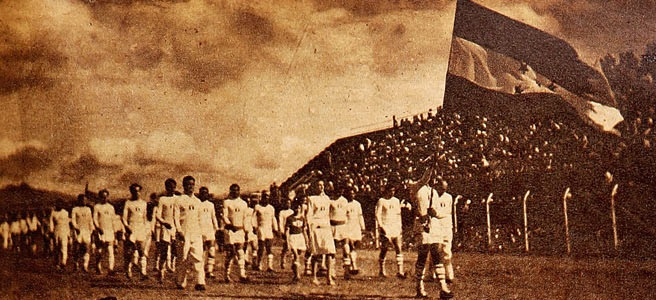
Honduran Football Team in 1946. The Honduran Federation of Football was affiliated to FIFA in that same year.

The national association is the Federación Nacional Autónoma de Fútbol de Honduras (FENAFUTH), headquartered in Tegucigalpa. The FENAFUTH was founded in 1935 by representatives of a small number of Honduran clubs. It joined FIFA in 1946 and co-founded CONCACAF in 1961.

FENAFUTH has not had great success. Bad financial management, its lack of planning, and in some cases its politicisation, has sometimes provoked chaos in this sporting entity. Honduras has qualified for three World Cups, five Olympic tournaments (2000, 2008, 2012, 2016, 2020), and 9 youth World Cups (Tunisia 1977, Qatar 1995, Nigeria 1999, Holland 2005, Egypt 2009, New Zealand 2015, South Korea 2017, Poland 2019, Argentina 2023.)

FENAFUTH was re-structured with the creation of the selection committee. This committee is now in charge of planning out and selecting. The rest of the federation, on the other hand, is in charge of planning and monitoring youth teams. These changes began to bear fruit with the qualification of the Under-17 team to the World Cup in Korea 2007.

== Football competitions ==
=== National League ===
The Liga Nacional de Fútbol de Honduras is the top tier league in Honduran football and has 10 member clubs. The second division league is Liga de Ascenso (promotion league). It was founded in 1980 and has 25 teams. Liga Mayor is the third division of football, made up of several developmental leagues.

Winning the Liga Nacional is considered the greatest achievement in Honduran football and guarantees qualification for the CONCACAF Champions League, the annual international club football championship for teams from the CONCACAF region.

=== League system ===
Below shows how the current system works. For each division, its official name and number of clubs is given. Each division promotes to the division(s) that lie directly above it and relegates to the division(s) that lie directly below it:

| Level | League / Division | No. of clubs |
|---|---|---|
| 1 | Liga Nacional de Fútbol de Honduras | 10 |
| 2 | Liga Nacional de Ascenso de Honduras | 32 |
| 3 | Liga Mayor de Futbol de Honduras, composed by many regional leagues that run in parallel. | 200+ |
| 4 | Liga Intermedia | |
| 5 | Liga Menor, youth leagues. | |

=== History of the national league ===
In the 1930s, football experienced a surge in popularity in the country. In 1948, with the birth of the Francisco Morazán Major Football League, the idea of organizing Honduran football began to take shape.

Olimpia, Federal, Motagua, Argentina and Real España were the pioneers of the Liga Mayor. The first championship began in 1948 in the recently inaugurated Estadio Tiburcio Carias Andino, when Victoria became champions by beating Motagua. They did so again in 1951. Due to the high support the League received at this time, the Confederacy Sports School Extra of Honduras (F.N.D.E.H.) was founded.

The cancellation of the court of the Stadium "Municipal" of San Pedro Sula was the catalyst that caused the sport's leaders of the northern and central parts of Honduras to join forces and caused the disappearance of the F.N.D.E.H.

On March 8, 1951, Juan Manuel Galvez gave life to the F.N.D.E.H. by signing presidential decree I number 97. A decade later, under the leadership of Hémerito F. Hernández and Féderico Bunker Aguilar (who had pioneered the creation of CONCACAF at the same time), the idea of the First National League of Football took shape between 1962 and 1963. Thanks in part to the help of executives who had studied in Mexico, such as Alejandro Talbott, the structure of that country's league was copied. On 3–4 April 1964, the 15th National Congress created the league, and it founded the National Professional League of Honduras, LINAFUTH, on 10 May of that year.

The president of the Sports Confederacy was Marvin A. Cuadra M. and the secretary was journalist Plutarco Saavedra Son. Several teams, including Olimpia, Troya, España, Honduras de El Progreso, Vida, Marathón, Motagua, La Salle, and Atlético Español Glidden, sent delegates, who were selected as the first Provisional Board of Directors, comprising: President Oscar Lara Mejía, Secretary José T. Castañeda, Treasurer Jesus J. Handal, with Humberto Soriano Aguilar, Oscar Kirckonell, Alfredo Bueso and René Bendeck.

The first matches of the new National League were played on 18 July 1965 with the following results: Olimpia 3–0 Marathón; España 1–0 Troya; Honduras 3–0 Atlético Español; Vida 4–1 Motagua; and Platense 6–2 La Salle. Pedro Deras of El Progreso de Honduras was the first scorer of the National League in the 5th minute against Atlético Español. Platense was the first professional champion of Honduras, winning the three rounds. Atlético Español finished last, but there was no relegation.

=== Qualification for international competitions ===
Clubs who win the Liga Nacional qualify to compete in CONCACAF competitions in the following season. Currently, Honduras has the following places in North American competitions:

| Competition | Who qualifies? | Notes |
|---|---|---|
| CONCACAF Champions League | Champion and Runners-up | Winners of the opening and closing tournaments of the Liga Nacional. If the same club wins both tournaments, the club with the highest points accumulated with the two tournaments qualifies. |

== Honduras National Teams ==
=== Honduran Youth Teams ===
Honduras is represented internationally at a youth level by the Honduras Under-15s, Honduras Under-17s, Honduras under-20s, and the Honduras Under-23s. Each of these teams represents Honduras in different international youth tournaments: The Under-15s compete in the Under-15s World Cup, and the Youth Olympics; the Under-17s compete in the Under-17s World Cup; the Under-20s compete in the Under-20s World Cup; and the Under-23s compete in Olympic Qualifying, and the Olympic Games.

=== Honduras Men's National Team ===
Honduras football official crest.

The Honduras Men's National Team is the representative team of the country in official men's football competitions. The Honduras national football team is nicknamed los Catrachos. It was founded in 1921, and played against Guatemala in 1921 in Guatemala City, in the very first international football match. It has participated in many international tournaments since then.

Its best results so far were qualifying for the World Cup three times: in the 1982, 2010 and 2014 World Cups.

==== Honduras in the 1982 World Cup ====
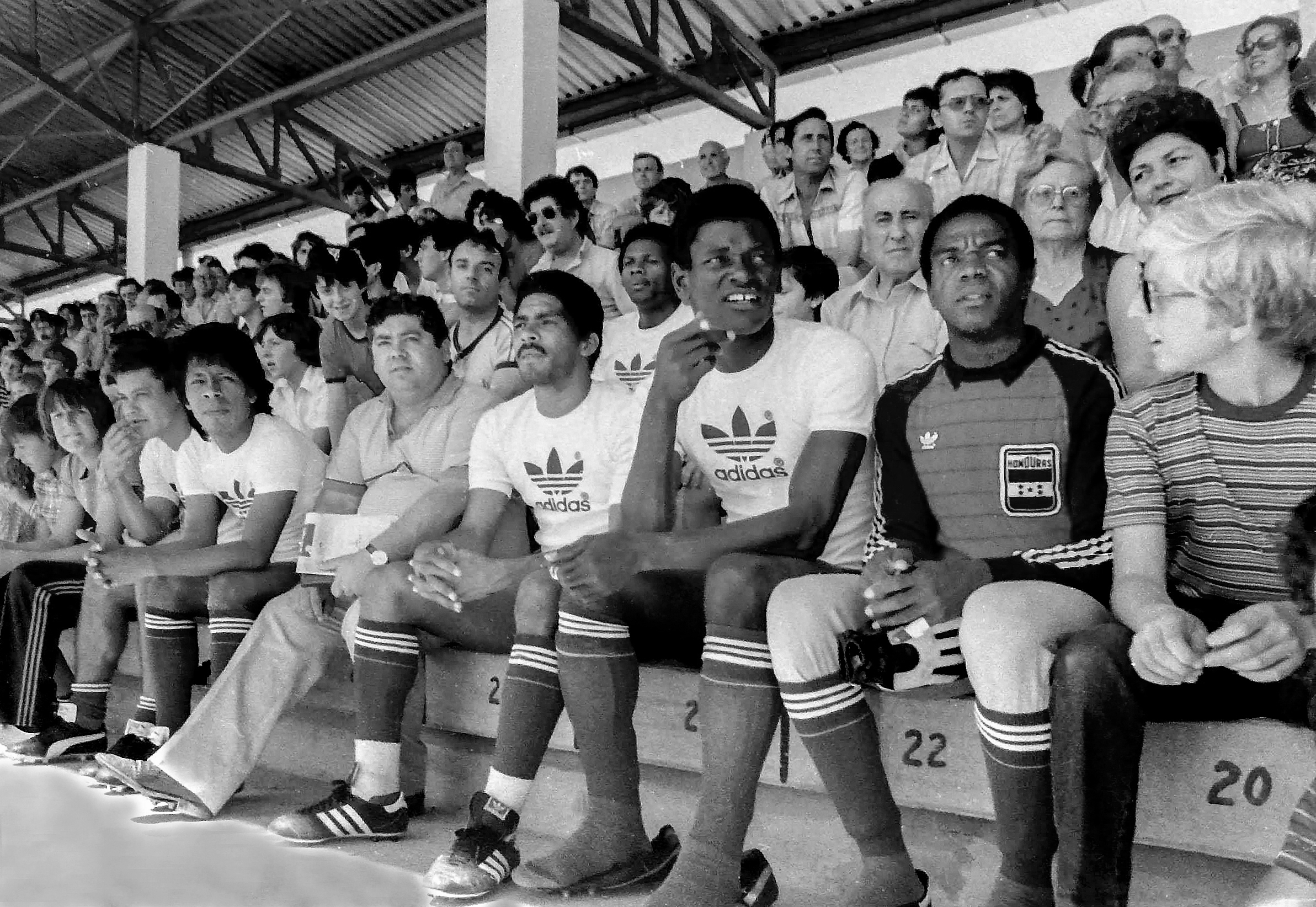
Honduran Team at Spain World Cup of 1982.

The first World Cup that Honduras qualified for was Spain 1982. It was in group 5, against Northern Ireland, Spain, and Yugoslavia. Honduras finished last place in the group, not winning a single game.

==== Honduras in the 2010 World Cup ====
In 2010, Honduras qualified for the World Cup a second time. They were placed in group H, against Spain, Chile, and Switzerland. Honduras finished last place in the group, and was eliminated. The nation lost all games but one, which they tied 0-0 against Switzerland.

==== Honduras in the 2014 World Cup ====
Honduras qualified for a world cup for the third time in 2014. Honduras was once again knocked out at the group stage, but this was their worst performance ever, losing every single game. They were in group E, against Switzerland, France, and Ecuador.

=== Honduras Women's National Team ===
The Honduras Women's National Team is the representative team of the country in official women's football competitions. The Honduras Women's National Team has not qualified to the CONCACAF Women's Championship and has not qualified to play in the FIFA Women's World Cup

== Football Players ==
Honduras has been the birthplace of many talented football players, and as such, many have had the opportunity to play abroad, and have had much success. Such was the case of José Enrique 'The Rabbit Cardona, Jorge Urquía, Gilberto Yearwood, José Roberto Figueroa, and others in Spain, as well as Carlos Pavón, and Eugenio Dolmo Flores in Mexico. More recent stories of success include David Suazo and Julio César de León in Italy. Others, as Eduardo Bennett, Milton Núñez and Danilo Turcios have found success in South America.

== Stadiums ==
Honduras have several stadiums, most of them of medium size.

Chelato Uclés National Stadium, Tegucigalpa.

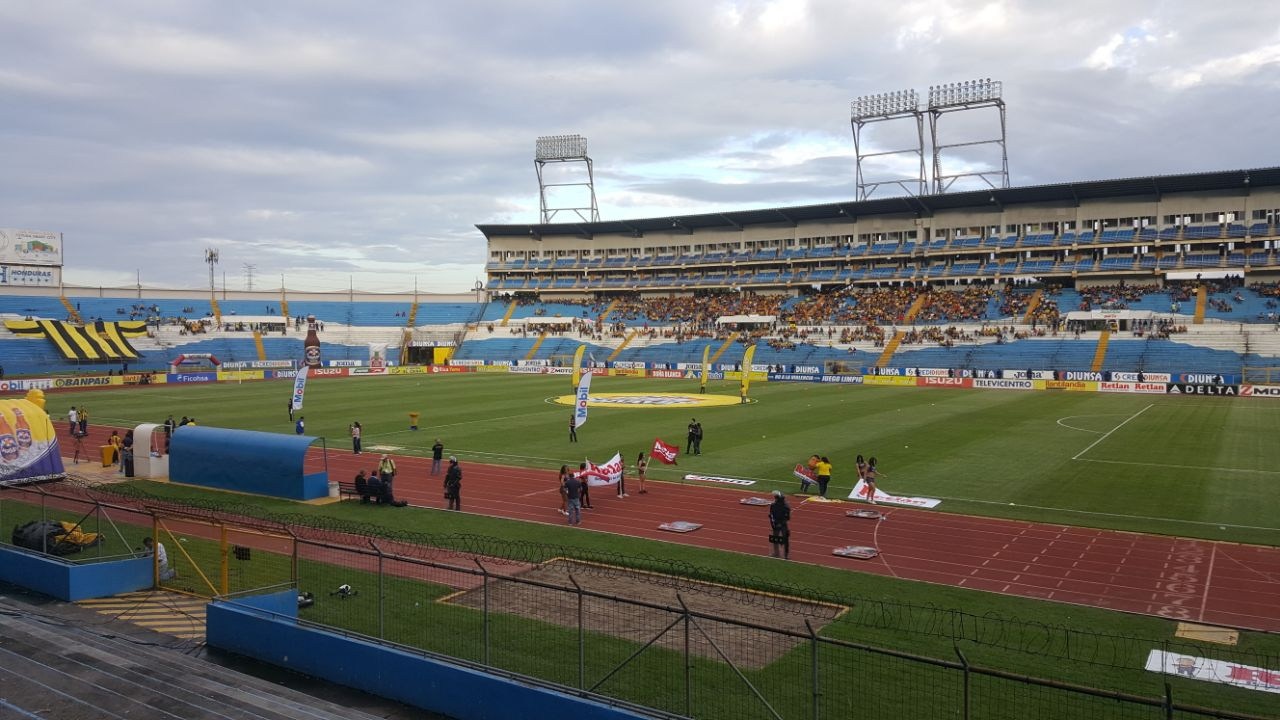
Metropolitan Olympic Stadium, San Pedro Sula.

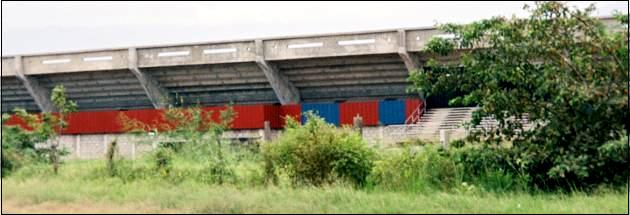
Carlos Miranda Stadium, Comayagua.

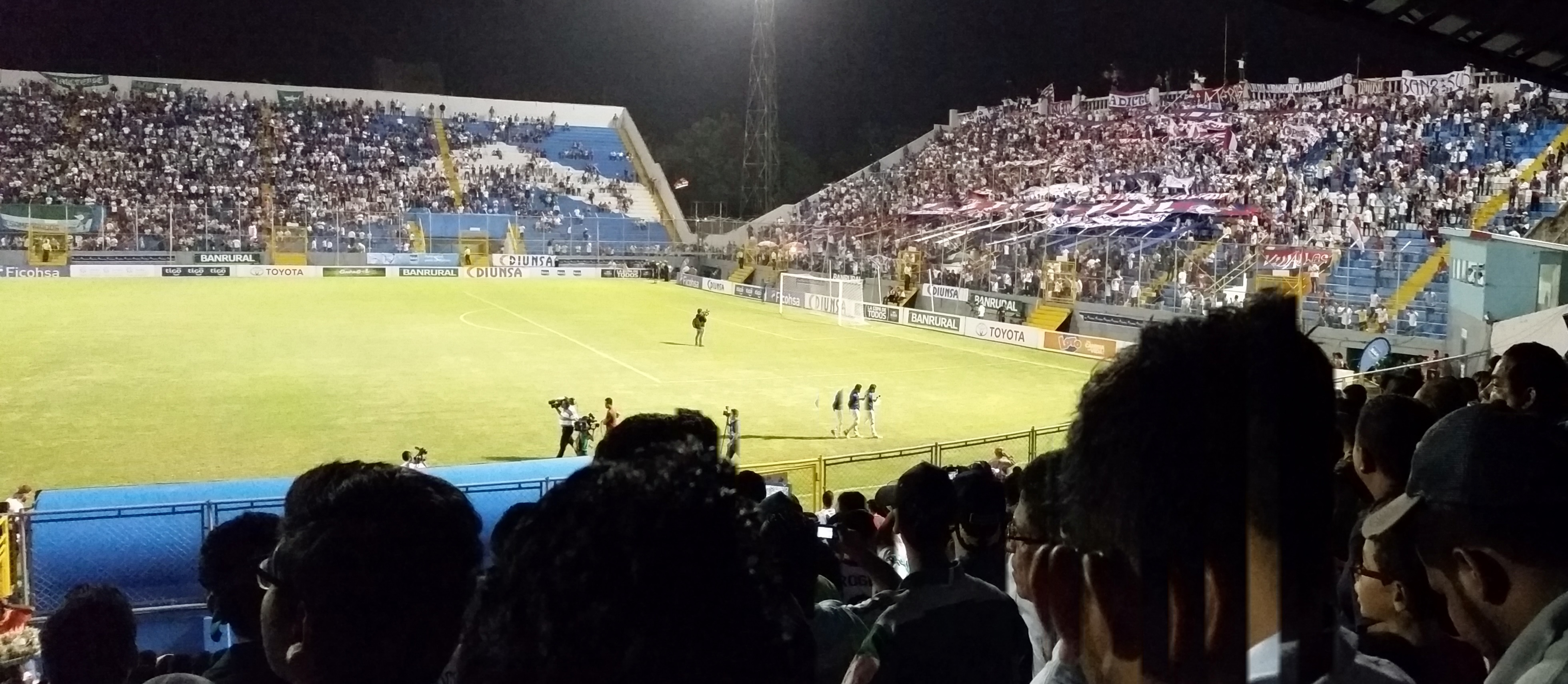
Morazán Stadium, San Pedro Sula.

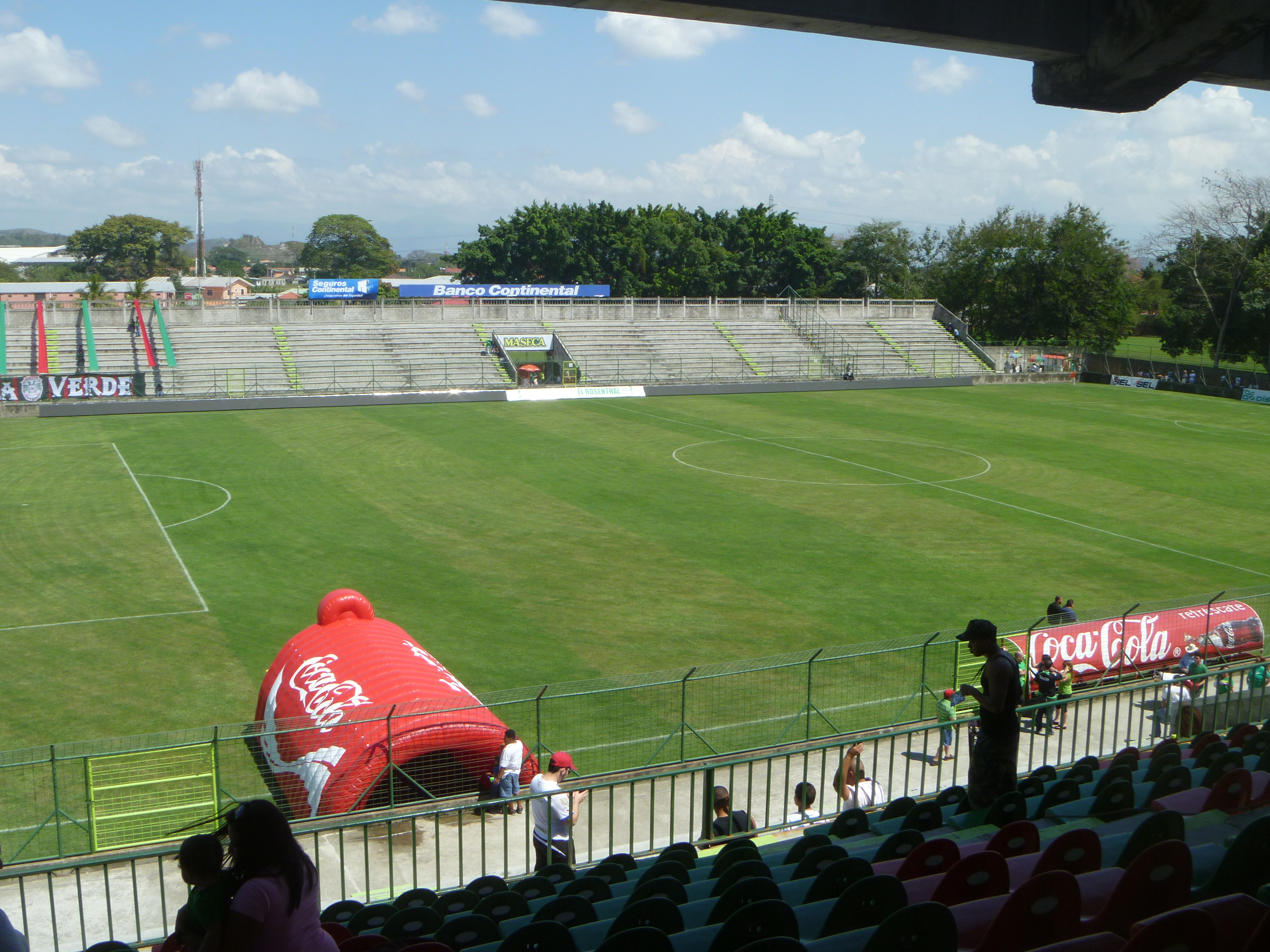
Yankel Rosenthal Stadium, San Pedro Sula

== Notable Honduran football clubs ==
- Club Deportivo Olimpia
- C.D. Aguán
- C.D. Motagua
- Real C.D. España
- C.D.S. Vida
- C.D. Victoria
- Platense F.C.

== Records ==
- In the 1969 season Olimpia became the only Honduran team to complete a season undefeated.
- In the 1970s Real España became the first "Tri-Campeon" in Honduras by winning the championship in 1974, 1975 and 1976.
- In 1972 Olimpia became continental champions by defeating the Surinamese club S.V. Robinhood 1–0.
- In 1980, 1981 and 1982, both Olimpia and Real España became Central American Champions, defeating the Guatemalan teams CSD Comunicaciones, Aurora F.C. and CSD Xelajú M.C.
- In 1982 the Honduras national football team qualified for their first FIFA World Cup, taking first place in their group. In the 1982 FIFA World Cup, Honduras made an unexpected debut against the host nation, Spain, drawing 1–1. In the next match Honduras drew 1–1 with Northern Ireland. They then lost 1–0 against Yugoslavia.
- In 1988, Olimpia defeated the Trinidad and Tobago club Defence Force 4–0, to become continental champions for the second time.
- Olimpia became two time consecutive champion of the UNCAF Club tournament for the second time, defeating Liga Deportiva Alajuelense twice.
- In 2000 Olimpia was runner-up in the CONCACAF Champions' Cup, winning all matches except the final against Los Angeles Galaxy. Thus, they qualified for the 2001 FIFA Club World Championship, but the tournament was not played because of the bankruptcy of FIFA partner ISL. Olimpia would have played Palmeiras (the 1999 CONMEBOL Copa Libertadores winners), Galatasaray (the 1999/2000 UEFA Cup winners) and Al-Hilal (the 2000 AFC Champions League winners).
- In 2001 the Honduras national football team was ranked no. 22 in the world – the highest position ever for Honduras – having achieved 3rd place in the 2001 Copa América and defeated Brazil on their way. They also almost made their second world cup appearance.
- In 2002 Honduras almost qualified for the world cup, but failed when they lost 1–0 to Trinidad and Tobago and by 3–0 to Mexico.
- In 2004–2006 Olimpia repeated Real España's 1970s achievement of becoming "Tri-Campeon".
- In 2007 C.D. Motagua became Central American champions with a 1–0 win over Deportivo Saprissa in Tegucigalpa.
- The teams from Tegucigalpa are the teams that have won the league most often: Olimpia with 22 titles, and Motagua with 11.

== Attendances ==
The average home attendances of the Apertura edition of the 2023-24 Liga Betcris are listed in the table below. CD Olimpia drew the highest average with 7,346. The league average was 1,993.

| # | Football club | Average attendance |
|---|---|---|
| 1 | CD Olimpia | 7,346 |
| 2 | FC Motagua | 5,206 |
| 3 | CD Génesis | 1,782 |
| 4 | CD Marathón | 1,310 |
| 5 | CDS Vida | 921 |
| 6 | Lobos UPNFM | 840 |
| 7 | Olancho FC | 831 |
| 8 | CD Real Sociedad | 670 |
| 9 | CD Victoria | 530 |
| 10 | Real España | 493 |

== See also ==
- Sport in Honduras
- Estadio Tiburcio Carías Andino
- Estadio Francisco Morazán
- Honduras women's national football team
