= Placido Betancourt =

Honduran rancher and politician

Placido Betancourt was a Honduran rancher and politician. He served as the mayor of Olanchito in 1899.
