= Estadio Chochi Sosa =

Stadium in Tegucigalpa, Honduras

- Nacional
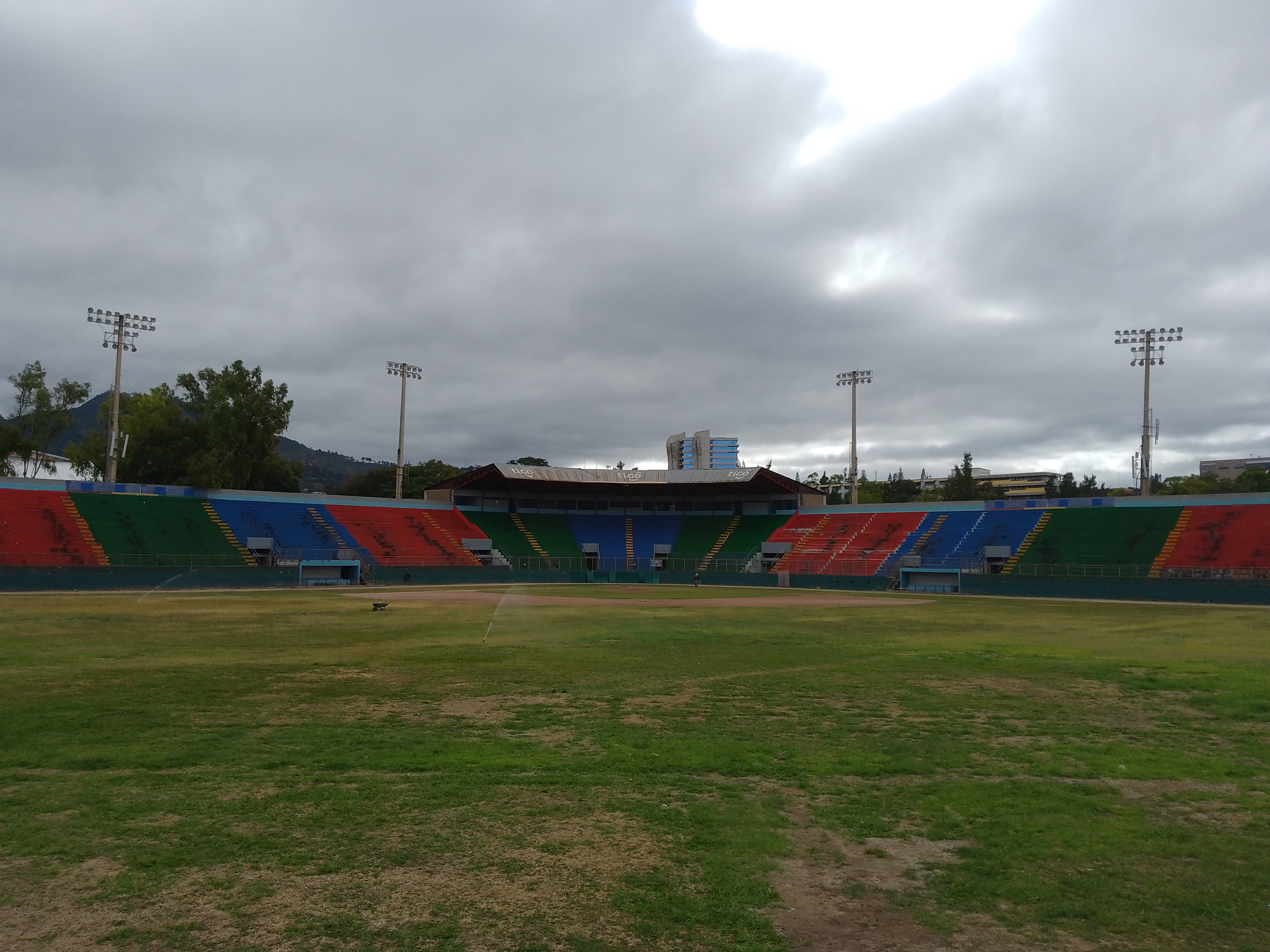
- National Baseball Stadium: 'Chochi Sosa' of Tegucigalpa.
- Full name: Estadio Chochi Sosa de Tegucigalpa
- Location: Tegucigalpa, Honduras
- Owner: Tegucigalpa Municipality
- Capacity: 12,000
- Surface: Grass

Construction
- Opened: November, 1989

Estadio Chochi Sosa (Chochi sosa Stadium) is a sports and concert venue located in Tegucigalpa, Honduras. It was completed in the late 80s and is part of the Tegucigalpa Olympic Village.

== History ==
The Chochi Sosa Stadium was built in 1989 in the Tegucigalpa Olympic Village during the government of liberal President José Azcona del Hoyo. It belongs to the Honduran government, is a public sports complex and is maintained by the National Sports Commission (CONDEPOR) with a budget of 10 million lempiras per month.

== Fame ==
The stadium is famous due to the several hundred concerts that have taken place inside it, among them artists such as Luis Miguel, Vicente Fernandez, and Vilma Palma e Vampiros.

== Gallery ==
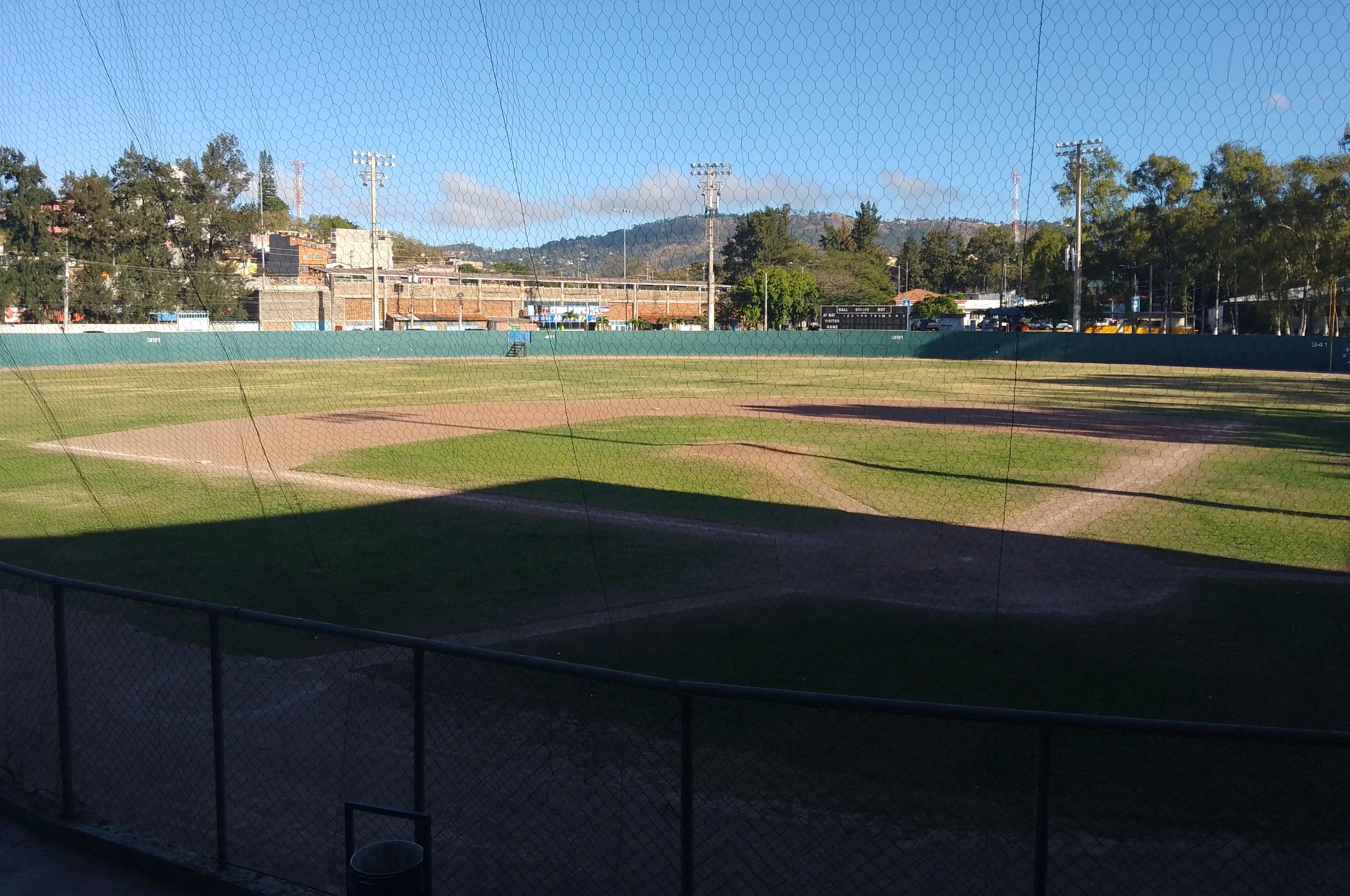
Game Field

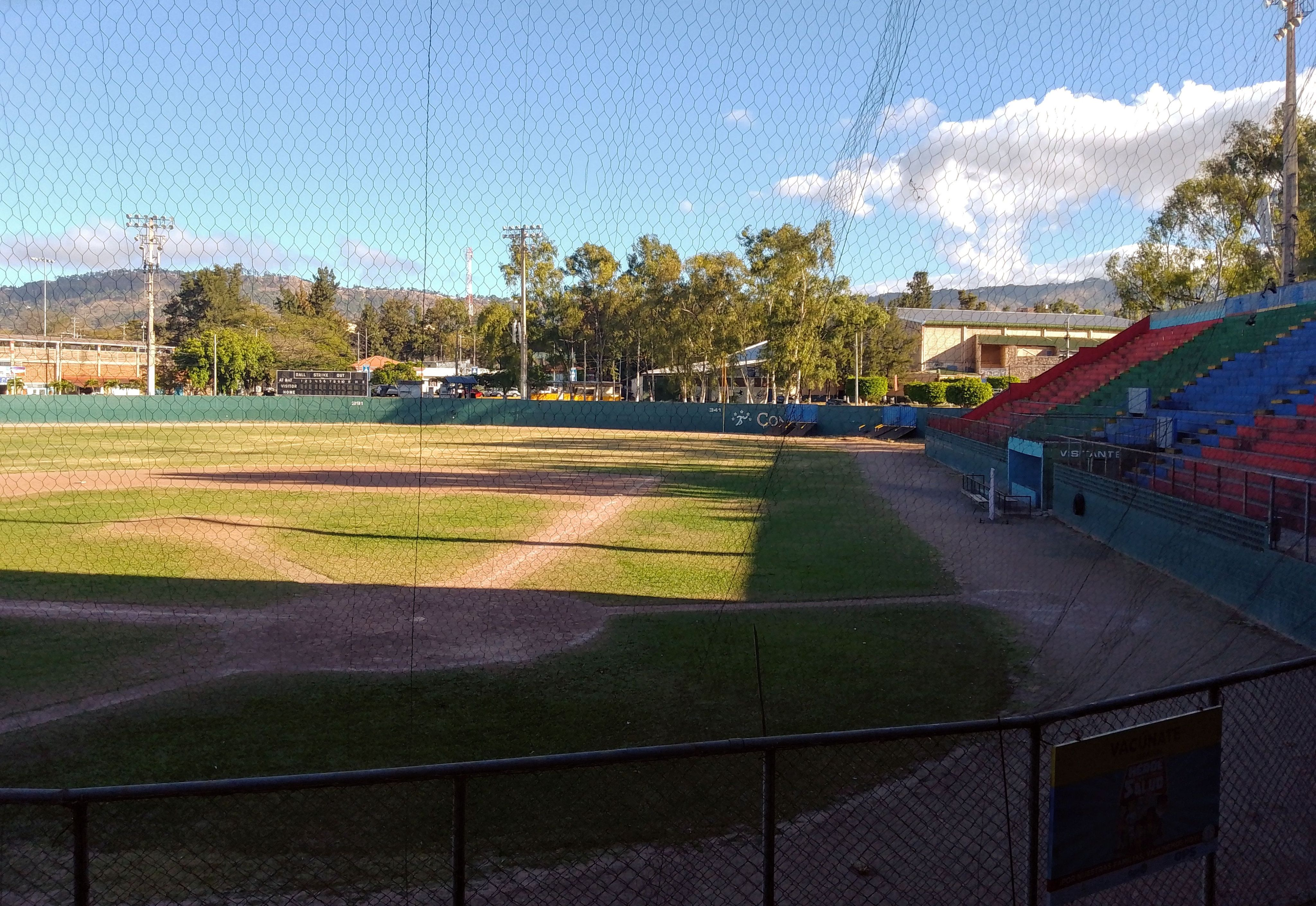
View to the seats

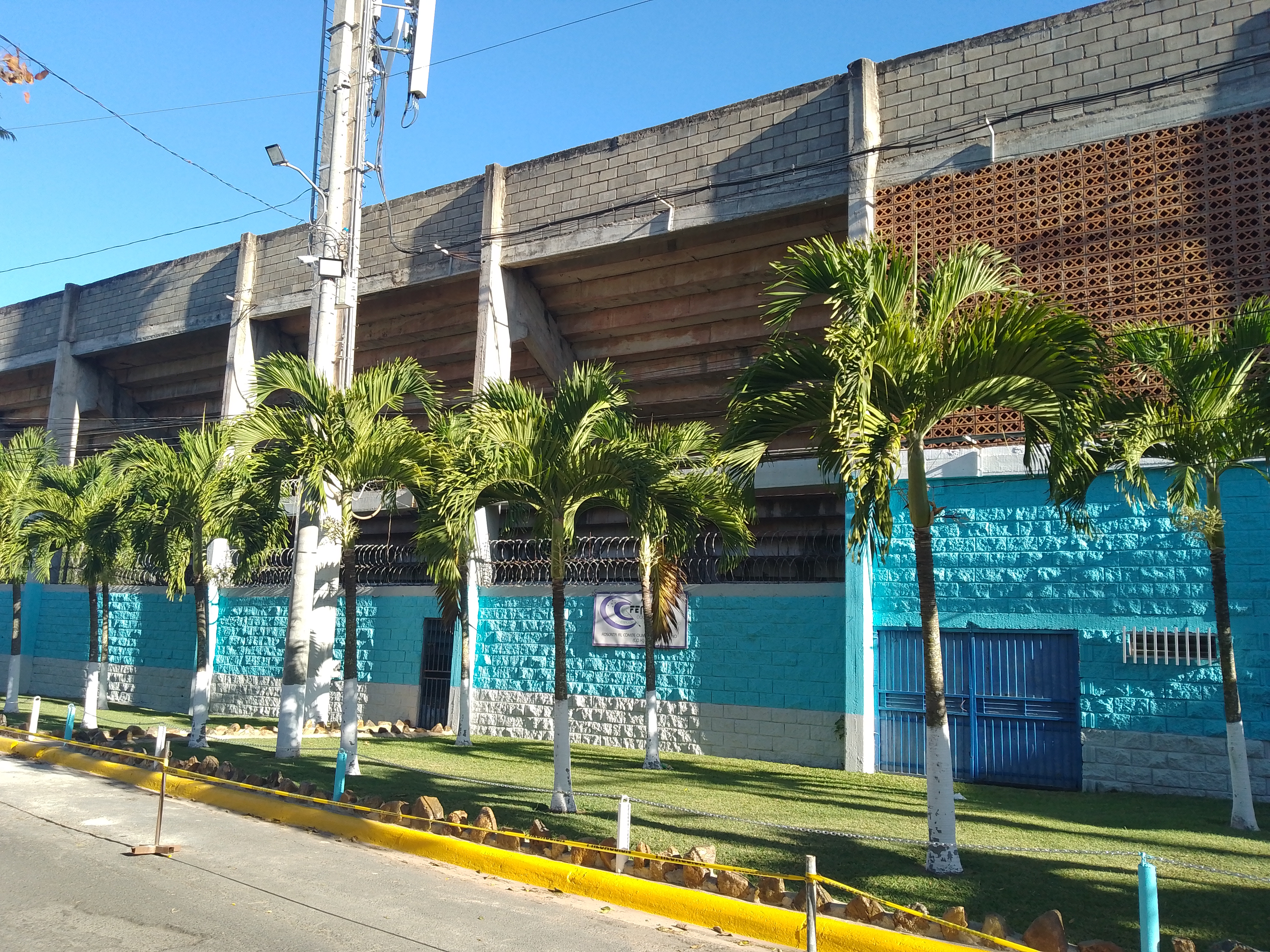
View from the outside.
