= Football Federation of Honduras =

Governing body of association football in Honduras

CONCACAF
- Founded: 1935; 91 years ago
- Headquarters: Tegucigalpa
- FIFA affiliation: 1946
- CONCACAF affiliation: 1961
- President: Jorge Salomón
- Website: http://ffh.hn/

The Football Federation of Honduras (Spanish: Federación de Fútbol de Honduras), known as FFH, is the official football governing body in Honduras and is in charge of the Honduras national team. FFH was founded in 1951 (current federation) and joined FIFA in 1946. It joined CONCACAF in 1961.

As of April 11, 2024, the federation officially rebranded from the National Autonomous Football Federation of Honduras (FENAFUTH) to Football Federation of Honduras (FFH), changing name, logo and colours.

== Association staff ==
Name	Position	Source
(Honduras) Jorge Salomón	President	
(Honduras) Wuilfredo Guzmán	Vice President I	
(Honduras) José Ernesto Mejía	General Secretary	
(Honduras) Gerardo Ramos	General Director	
(Honduras) Luis Brevé	Technical Secretary	
(Uruguay) Daniel Uberti	Youth Teams Coordinator	
n/a	Team Coach (Men's)	
(Colombia) Mario Abadia	Team Coach (Women's)	
(Honduras) Edwin Banegas	Media/Communications Manager	
(Honduras) Marco Garay	Coaching Licensing Director	
(Honduras) Oscar Velásquez	Referee Coordinator	

== See also ==
- Sport in Honduras
  - Football in Honduras
    - Women's football in Honduras
- Honduras national football team
- Honduras women's national football team
