= Sport in Honduras =

The most popular sport in Honduras is association football. The governing body of football in Honduras is the Federación Nacional Autónoma de Fútbol de Honduras. Honduras has taken part in the Summer Olympics eight times, and the Winter Olympics in 1992.

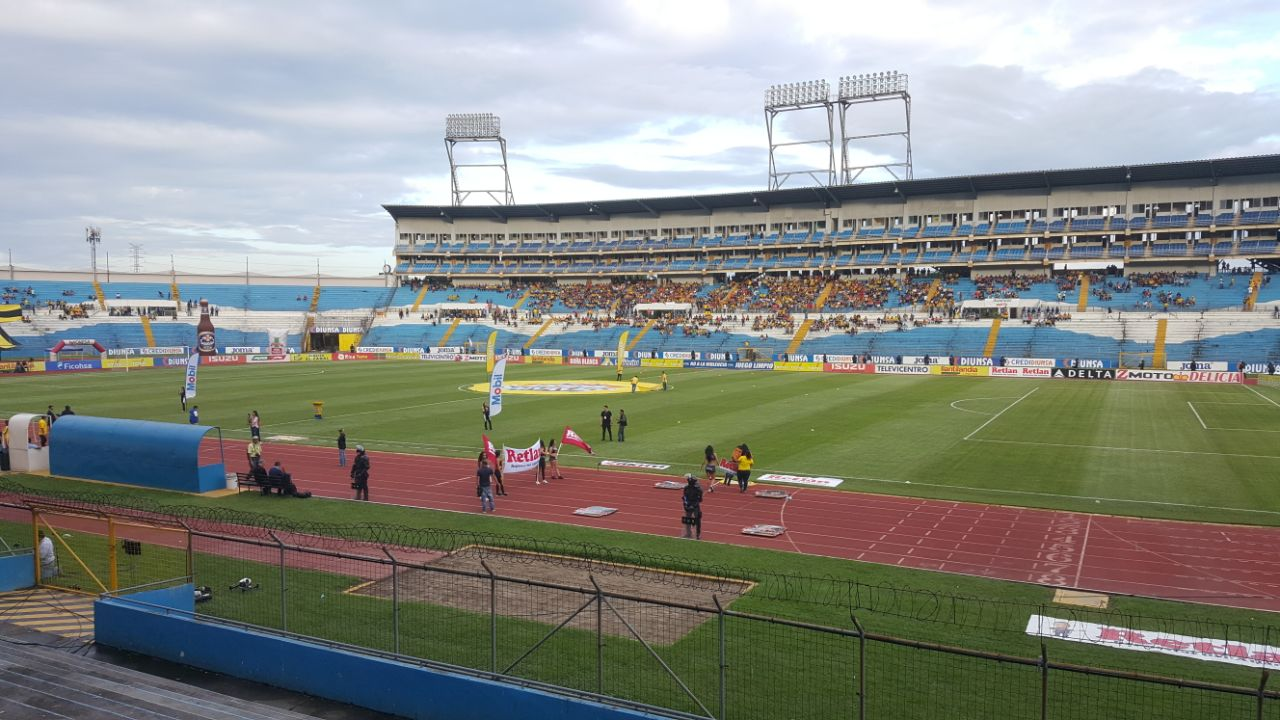
Sports Stadium in Honduras

== Sports ==
=== Football ===
Association football is the most popular sport between the Hondurans, the country arrived as in many others at the beginning of the 20th century, until was properly organized and Honduras national football team was created in the early 1960s. Honduras have played in three world cups, Spain 82, South Africa 2010, Brazil 2014.

=== Chess ===
Chess has been played in Honduras since colonial era, the first national league of Chess was the "Liga Sanpedrana de Ajedrez" founded in 1973, in 1993 was founded the National Federation of Chess of Honduras. Between the chess players stood out in Honduras finds Ricardo Urbina, the one who in the 2004 was the first national chess player that has reached the category of International Master (IM).

Other sports played in Honduras include tennis, baseball, swimming, and American football.

== See also ==
- Culture of Honduras
- Tegucigalpa Olympic Village
- Honduras at the Olympics
- Soccer in Honduras
