= TABSO Flight 101 =

1966 aviation accident

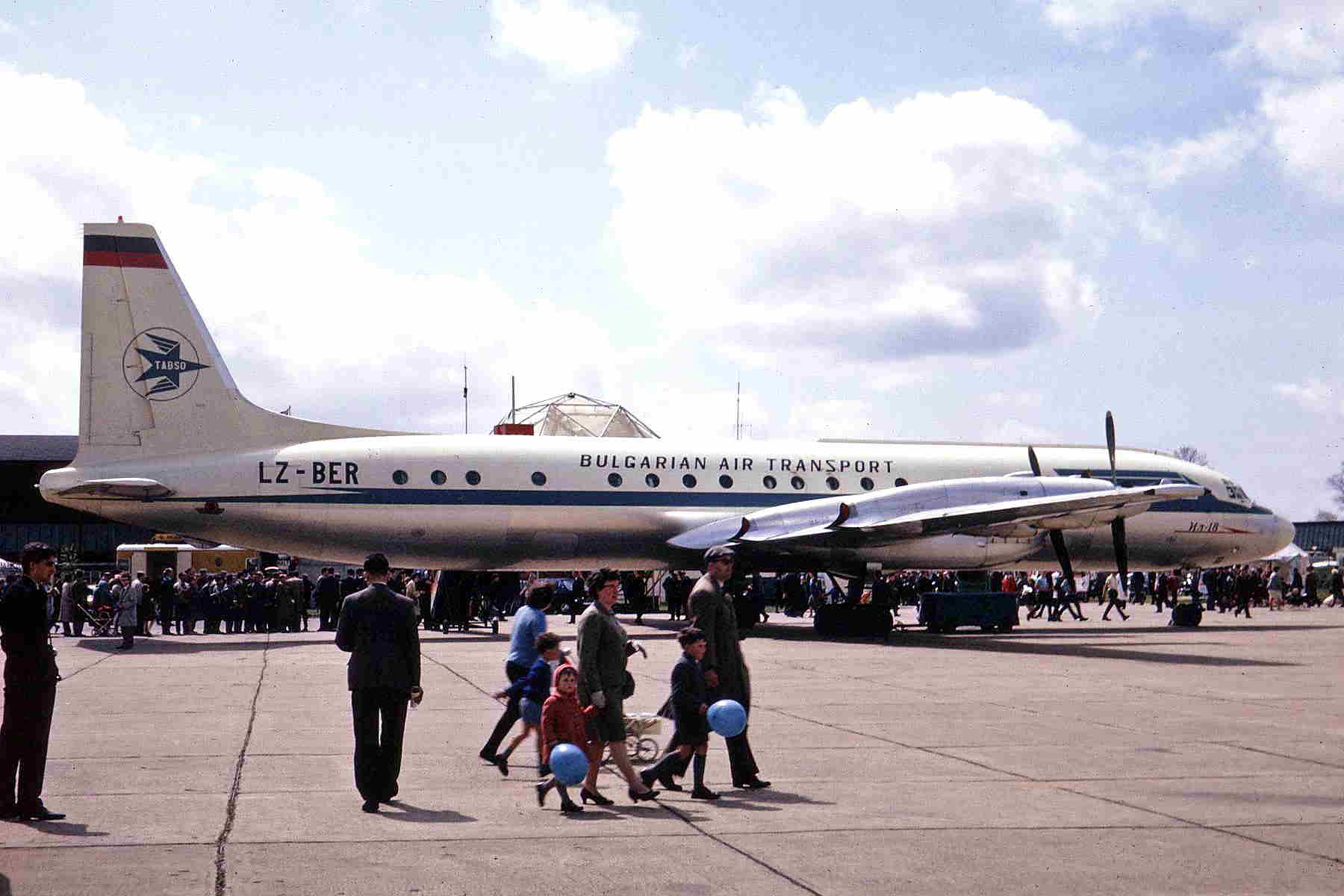
- A TABSO Ilyushin Il-18, similar to the accident aircraft

Accident
- Date: 24 November 1966
- Summary: Controlled flight into terrain, bad weather and pilot error, official cause undetermined
- Site: Bratislava, Czechoslovakia; 48°14′40″N 17°09′55″E

Aircraft
- Aircraft type: Ilyushin Il-18V
- Operator: TABSO
- Registration: LZ-BEN
- Flight origin: Sofia Airport, Sofia
- 1st stopover: Budapest Ferihegy International Airport, Budapest
- Last stopover: Prague Ruzyně International Airport, Prague
- Destination: Berlin Schönefeld Airport, East Berlin
- Occupants: 82
- Passengers: 74
- Crew: 8
- Fatalities: 82
- Survivors: 0

TABSO Flight 101 was a scheduled service of the Bulgarian national airline from Sofia, Bulgaria, via Budapest, Hungary, and Prague, Czechoslovakia, to Berlin Schönefeld Airport in East Germany. The service was operated by the airline's 1960s' flagship equipment, the Ilyushin Il-18B airliner. On Thursday 24 November 1966, due to bad weather the aircraft was diverted to Bratislava airport, but when the flight resumed, the aircraft crashed into the surrounding hills shortly after takeoff, with the loss of 82 lives. The crash site is within modern-day Slovakia, and is considered that country's deadliest aviation disaster.

== Background ==
On the day of the accident, Flight 101 was operated by an Il-18B airliner registered LZ-BEN. It had been manufactured in January 1964 and had been accepted by TABSO on 22 January that year. By the time of the accident, it had not been involved in any incidents and had been maintained in accordance with the manufacturer's schedules.

The crew comprised Commander (captain) Lubomir Todorov Antonov, 41 years old, with 11,959 total flight hours. He was among TABSO's most senior Il-18 commanders, having gained command of the type in July 1962, a month or so after its inauguration into his airline's service. Antonov had passed a proficiency test two days earlier. He was very familiar with Bratislava Airport, having operated there on 11 prior occasions. Second Pilot (first officer) was Svetomir Dimitrov Shakadanov, 36, with 5975 flight hours. He had passed a proficiency check the previous day. Navigator Officer was First Class Specialist Navigator Slavi Stefanov Tomakov. Radio-Telegraphy Officer was Nikola Aleksandrov Tasev, 36 years old, with 3160 flight hours. On-Board Mechanical Officer was Stoyan Todorov Rangelov, 42, with 3602 flight hours. Cabin crew comprised stewardesses Maria Ivanova, Svetla Georgieva (also known as Svetla Marinova, married 18 days earlier to Ivan Slavkov) and Violina Stoichkova.

Nationality	Deaths
Bulgaria	45
Hungary	16
Czechoslovakia	5
Germany	5
Brazil	3
Chile	2
Argentina	1
Honduras	1
Japan	1
United Kingdom	1
Switzerland	1
Tunisia	1
Total	82

The 74 passengers on board Flight LZ101 were of 12 nationalities: Bulgarians, Argentinians, Britons, Chileans, Czechoslovaks, Germans, Hondurans, Hungarians, Japanese, Soviets, Swiss and Tunisians. Among them were four members of the Hungarian national judo team and their coach, Bulgarian opera soloist Katya Popova, Bulgaria's ambassador to the German Democratic Republic, General Ivan Buchvarov and famous Honduran writer and journalist Ramón Amaya Amador. The diversity of nationalities was partly explained by the recent Ninth Congress of the BKP Bulgarian Communist Party, many of them having been delegated to it by foreign communist parties.

== Events ==
Flight LZ101 departed Budapest at 11:46 hours CET. While it was en route, weather in Prague deteriorated. Commander Antonov elected to make a diversion to Bratislava Airport, landing there at 11:58. By 15:30, the weather in Prague had improved and Antonov decided to prepare to resume the flight. Bratislava Airport meteorologist Jan Popeleny briefed the Commander that medium to strong turbulence was expected above the Little Carpathians hills north-west of Bratislava.

By 16:10 the flight had boarded and at 16:20:30, Antonov was given clearance to taxi to Runway 04 or Runway 31 at his discretion. (He chose to use Runway 31 whose extended centreline crossed the Little Carpathians.) At the same time, he was cleared to take off, to turn right, to overfly the Nitra radio beacon and to proceed to overhead Brno and on to Prague at 5,100 metres (16,700 ft) Meanwhile, an Il-14 airliner of Czechoslovak Airlines (now as Czech Airlines) had taken off from Bratislava. In order to maintain separation between the slower Il-14 and his faster Il-18, Antonov was instructed to maintain a height of 300 metres (980 ft) until cleared to climb to his cruise altitude.

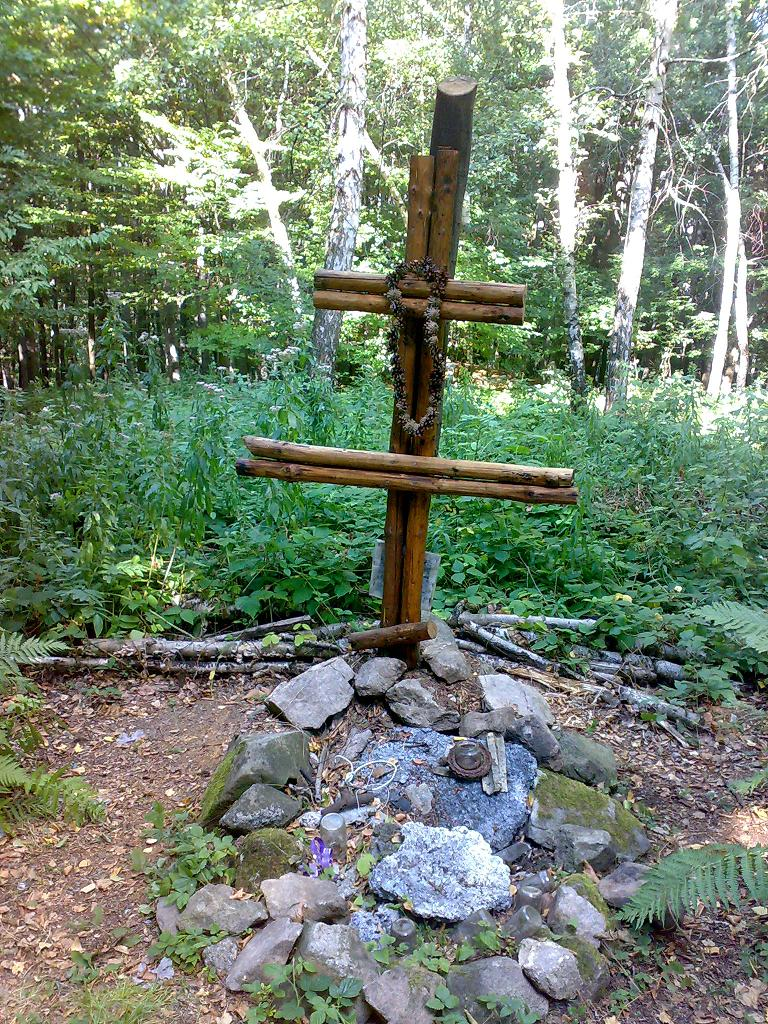
Memorial cross at the site of the crash

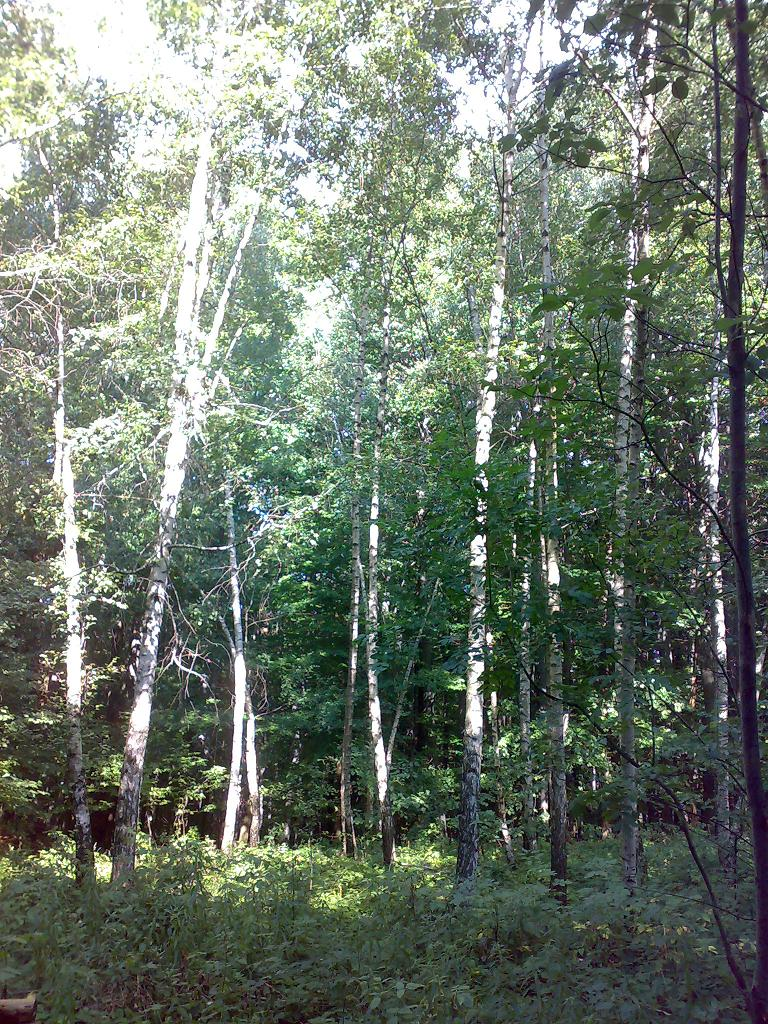
Birch trees at the accident site

Flight LZ101 took off at 16:28 hrs in almost total darkness. Its departure was observed by air traffic controller Jaroslav Vadovic who reported that it had been normal. Shortly after reporting lift-off, LZ101 was instructed to turn right and contact the Bratislava Approach controller on a frequency of 120.9 MHz. The airliner failed to make the transition to Approach control. Some two minutes after departing Bratislava Airport, it crashed eight kilometres (5.0 mi; 4.3 nmi) from the airport into the Sakrakopec location in the foothills of the Little Carpathians, near Bratislava's borough of Rača. The area of impact was 288 metres (945 ft) above the elevation of the airport. The aircraft struck the snow-covered ground while flying without any bank angle, at a speed of some 250 knots (460 km/h; 290 mph) and while full take-off power was delivered by its engines. As it disintegrated over a period of 20 seconds, it left a swathe with a total length of 562 metres (1,844 ft; 615 yd) and a width of between 30 and 10 metres (98 and 33 ft; 33 and 11 yd), of which the main wreckage was located towards the end of a 265-metre-long (869 ft; 290 yd) strip. A fierce fuel fire broke out but burned out fairly rapidly, mostly because fragments and fuel had dispersed over a large area.

The location of the crash was close to built-up areas of Bratislava and very popular with hikers. The accident was observed and heard by many local residents, including an off-duty air traffic controller who immediately telephoned his colleagues at the airport. The approach controllers at the airport had not, however, observed the accident, visually or on radar.

Because of difficult terrain, total darkness and poor weather, rescue services failed to find the scene of the crash for an hour and a half after being summoned. More delays and hesitation were caused by fears that the airliner might have been carrying radioactive isotopes. Within the next three days, the bodies of 74 of the 82 souls on board were recovered and transported to Bratislava for identification. Most victims had died instantly due to multiple injuries received during the impact, and most had severe burn marks sustained post-mortem.

Today, a timber cross marks the site where the aircraft's flightdeck came to a rest and 82 birch trees (one for each victim) mark the general location of the wreckage.

== Investigation ==
The investigation was conducted by a Czechoslovak commission headed by Chief Inspector of Aeronautics Jan Dvorak. Under international law, he coopted representatives of the country in which the aircraft was registered and representatives of the Ilyushin design bureau and the Ivchenko engine design bureau. A Bulgarian commission of enquiry was also formed, headed by State Comptrol Commission chairman and BKP Bulgarian Communist Party Central Committee member Ninko Stefanov and also included TABSO Director General Lazar Beluhov, air specialist and deputy defence minister Gen Avgust Kabakchiev and Darzhavna Sigurnost (State Security) investigator Col Ivan Ohridski, chief police pathologist Dr Yordan Peychev and others, enough to fill two specially chartered aircraft. The Bulgarians requested to lead the inquiry under a provision in international law which allowed this. The Czechoslovak authorities refused this on the grounds of reciprocity: Bulgaria had not signed the clause allowing foreign investigators to inquire into crashes in Bulgaria.

The investigators documented that the local militia (police), Czechoslovak State Security and Bratislava Military Engineer School ranks searched an area of some 350 by 50 metres (1,150 by 160 ft) surrounding the accident site. This involved removing snow cover of between 30 and 50 cm (12 and 20 in). The fears that the airliner was carrying radioactive isotopes were confirmed on 8 December 1966 when it was stated that it carried two steel-lead containers with iodine-131 for medical purposes. This is permitted for carriage on commercial flights under international law. The airliner's altimeter was found to indicate the correct height above Bratislava airport.

Extreme and escalating tension between the Bulgarian and Czechoslovak authorities and accident investigators was apparent from the outset. An advance TABSO party led by Beluhov had arrived at Bratislava the day after the crash but had been denied any access to the accident site or to any air traffic controllers. The Bulgarian side believed that air traffic controllers in the local Tower and Approach sectors had neglected their duties in allowing a slower aircraft (the Il-14) to depart before a high-performance aircraft (the Il-18), in failing to clear flight LZ101 to a safe height, and in failing to monitor its progress on radar. The Czechoslovak side believed that the flight crew had demonstrated poor comprehension of English by failing to turn right after lift-off, as instructed. The Czechoslovaks were also accused by the Bulgarians of spreading rumours that LZ101's flight crew had consumed alcohol while waiting in Bratislava. Dr Peychev insisted that a test recently developed by NASA be conducted on tissues taken from the Commander and Second Pilot; the results showed that they had not consumed alcohol.

Ultimately, Czechoslovak Minister of Transport Alois Indra assumed overall control of the investigation in order to resolve the conflict between the Bulgarian and Czechoslovak sides. The issues in the conflict touched national prestige and the amount of damages payable to the victims' families: if Czechoslovak air traffic control was found deficient, they would receive 20,000 US dollars each. If the Bulgarian crew was found deficient, they would receive 10,000 leva each.

The Czechoslovak commission's eventual report stated that departure from runway 31 followed by climb to 300 metres (980 ft) was possible without colliding with obstacles. While the stipulated height of 300 metres was adhered to, the aircraft departed from the route which would have kept it clear of ground obstacles. This deviation may have been caused by a wider than necessary turn, greater speed, or a combination of both. It was not possible to exclude the possibility that the crew may have doubted the correct operation of their artificial horizon. It was also not possible to exclude the effect of turbulence on maintaining a uniform bank angle in the turn. The crew, however, had sufficient warning of the weather. The situation became critical when the crew failed to execute the stipulated and acknowledged departure manoeuvre and when unpredictable circumstances may have arisen and accrued during the turn. The report concluded that the cause of the accident could not be determined clearly from the established facts. The most likely cause was inadequate evaluation of terrain and weather by the crew, leading them to fly in a manner inappropriate to these conditions.

== In popular culture ==
The accident was the second one to befall TABSO since 1952 and the airline's first publicly acknowledged one. Largely because of the loss of Katya Popova, well known Bulgarian lyric soprano, it had a massive public resonance in Bulgaria. The remains of the Bulgarian victims were ceremonially returned to Sofia and interred in the city's main cemetery, and all traffic was brought to a two-minute standstill when air-raid sirens sounded throughout Bulgaria. Poet Pavel Matev wrote the valedictory poem Ti san li si? ("Are you but a dream?") to Katya Popova which singer Lili Ivanova turned into a remorseful popular hit.

== Ivan Buchvarov conspiracy theory ==
One of the accident investigators appointed by the Bulgarian side, Supreme Court investigating magistrate Nedyu Ganchev, committed suicide during the closing stages of the investigation. Shortly beforehand, he had said to friends, "I cannot do what they insist I should do." This led some Bulgarians to believe that the crash might have been staged by Todor Zhivkov in order to eliminate Gen. Buchvarov. The topic rapidly became the subject of insistent dark rumours at the time. It was revived after the fall of Zhivkov. No evidence has been found to confirm or deny this.

== Gallery ==
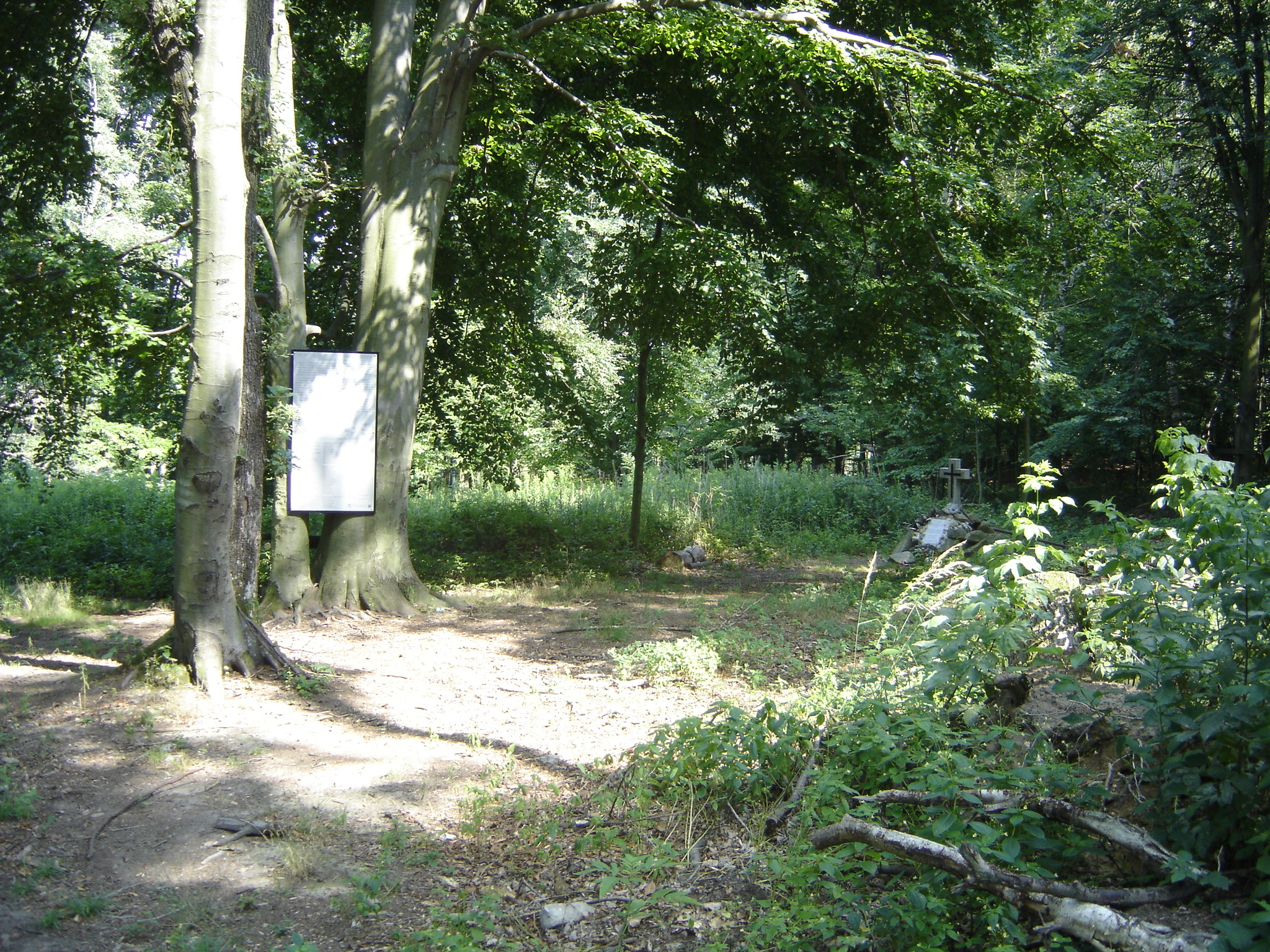
The site of the disaster

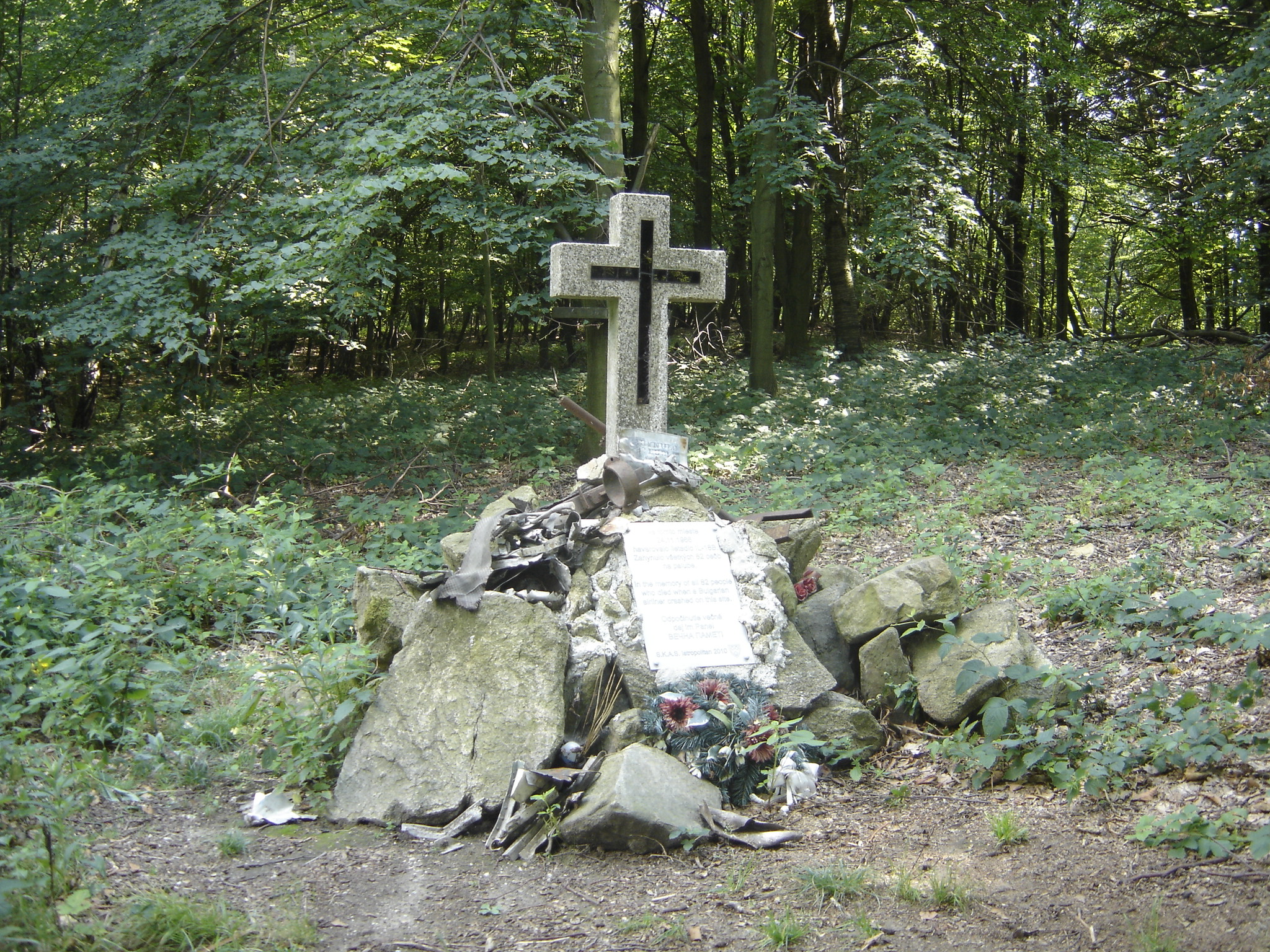
The cross and the board

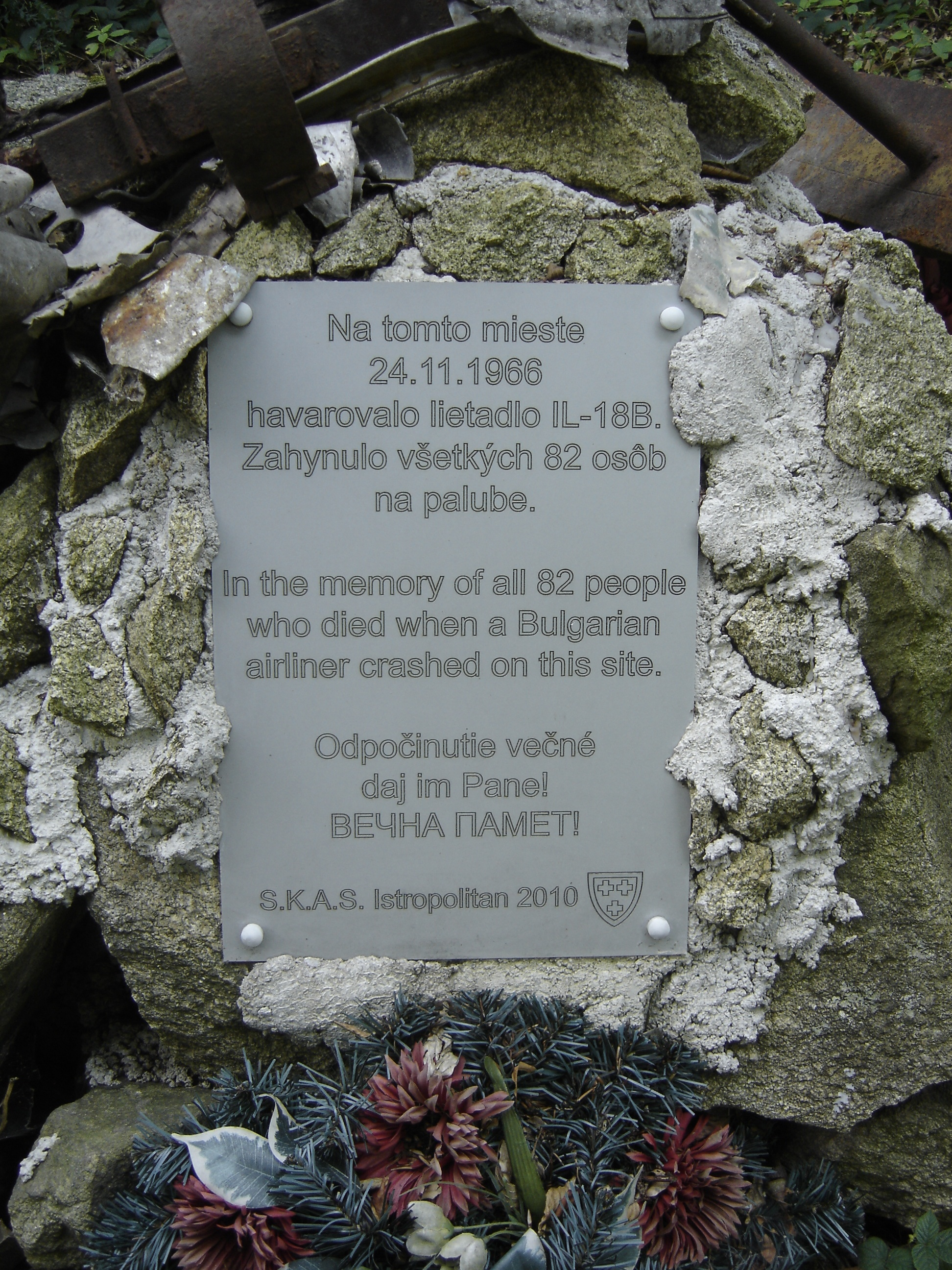
The board below the cross

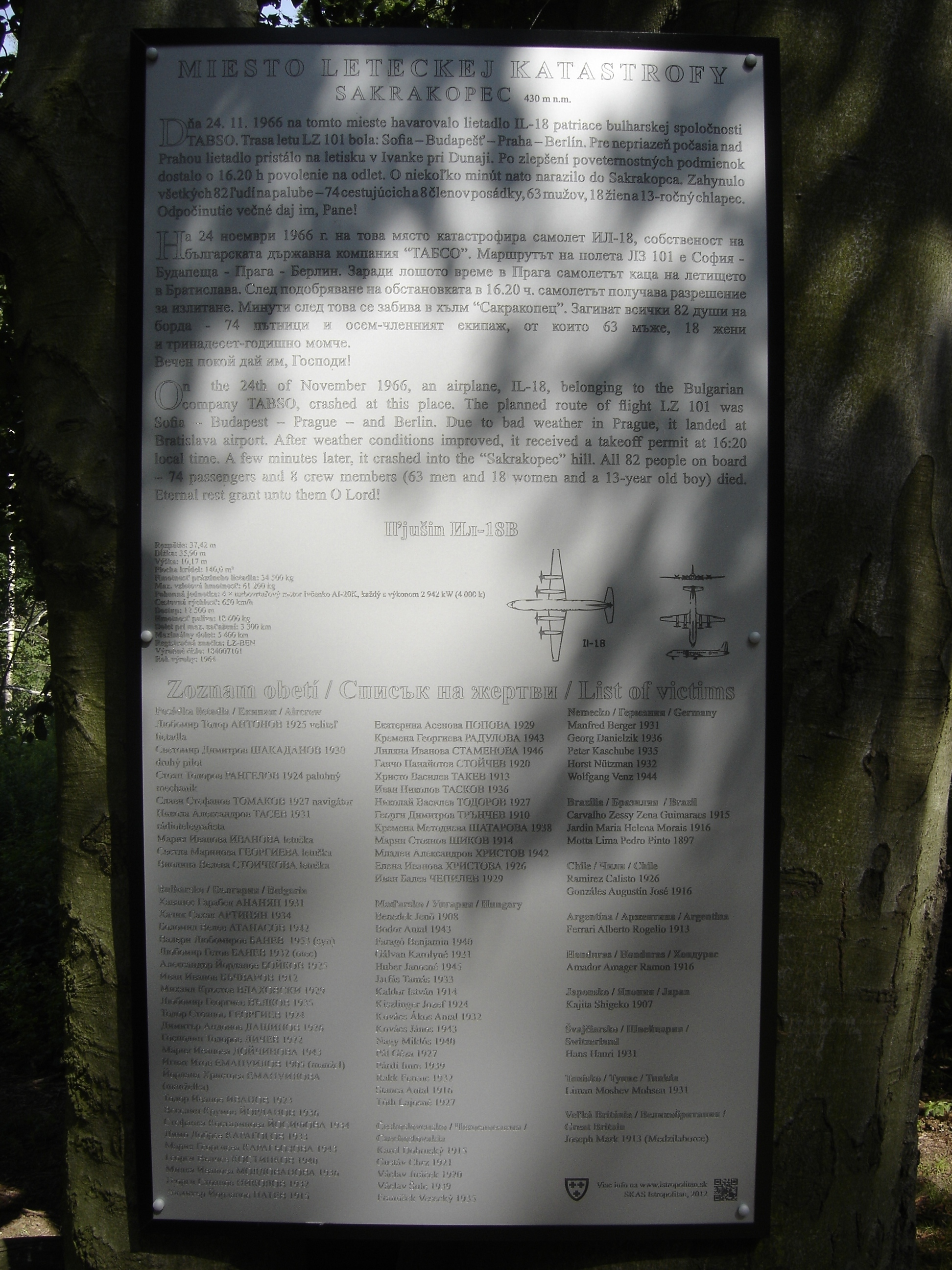
Information board in 3 languages: Slovak, Bulgarian, English (2012)

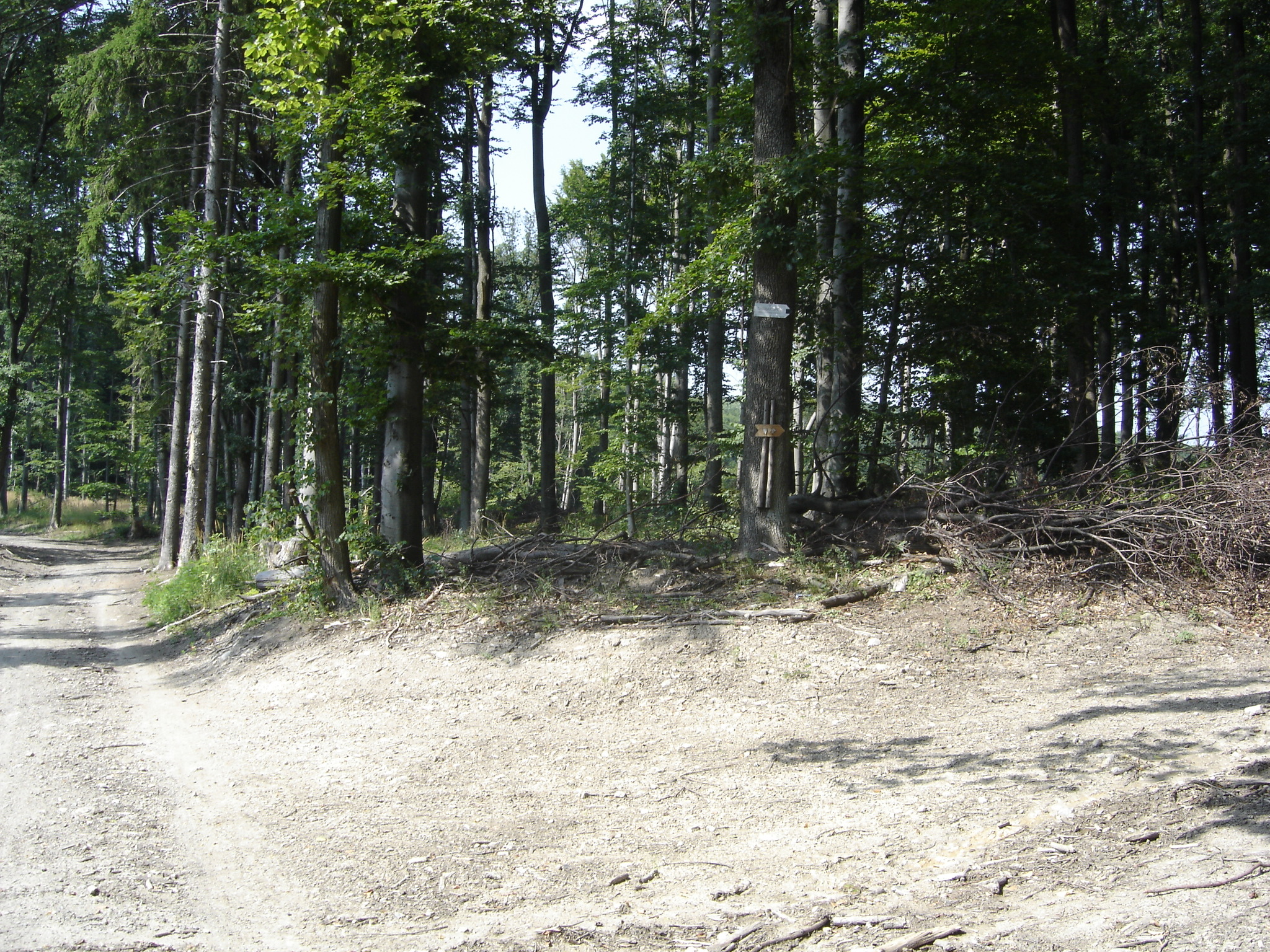
Last crossroad before the site of the disaster

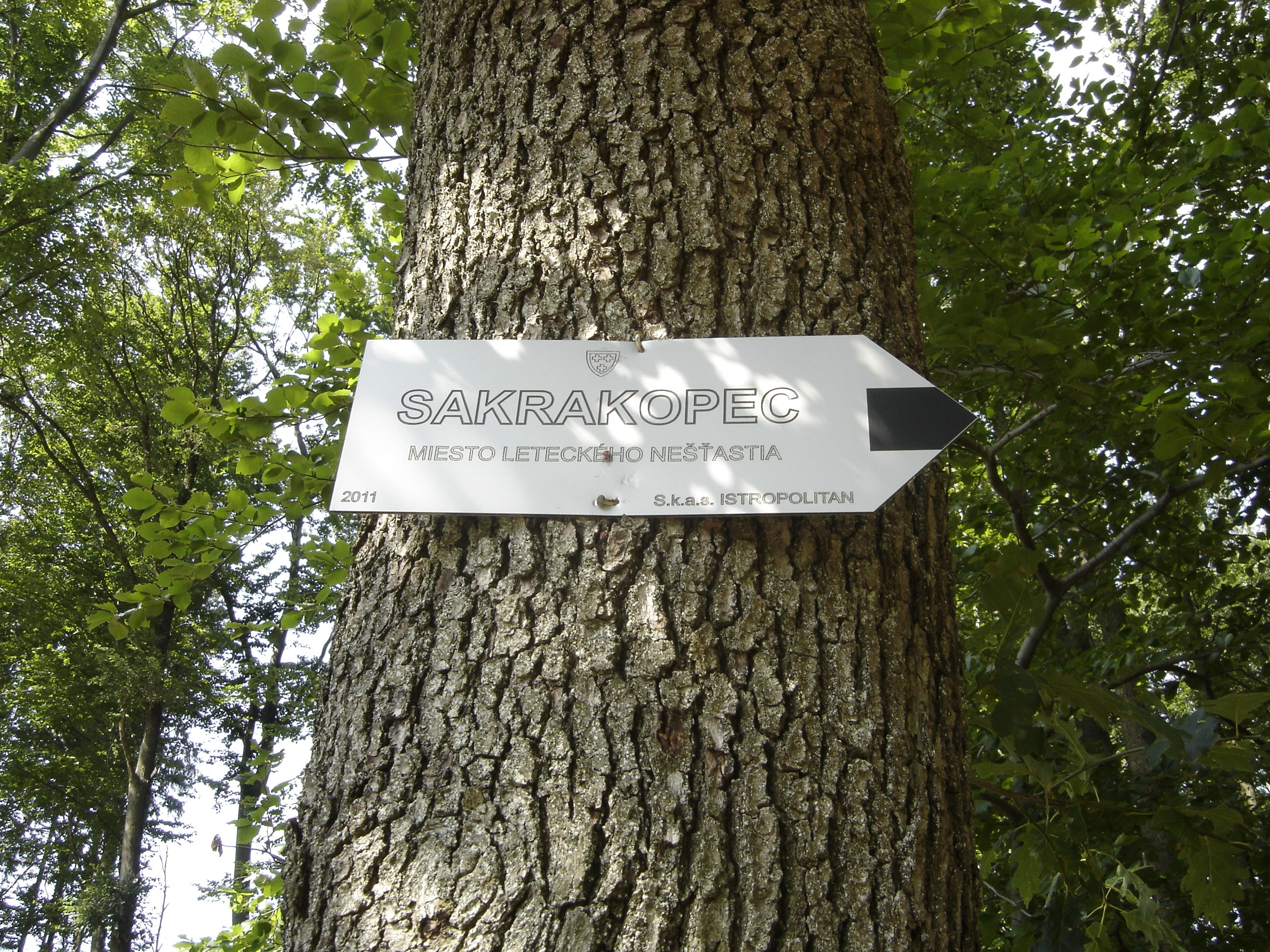
The guidepost to the site of the disaster

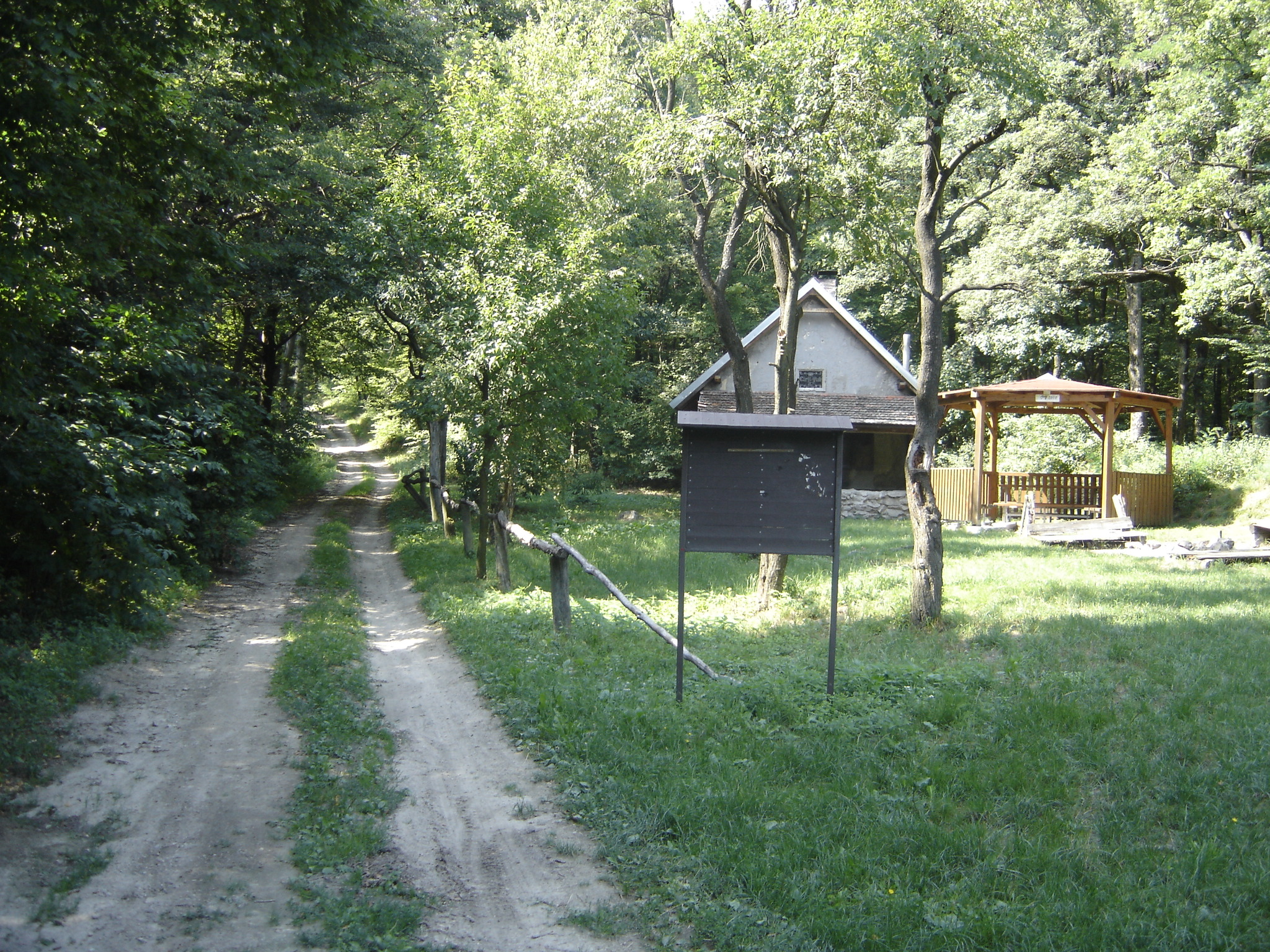
Direction to the site of the disaster (distance 1 km)

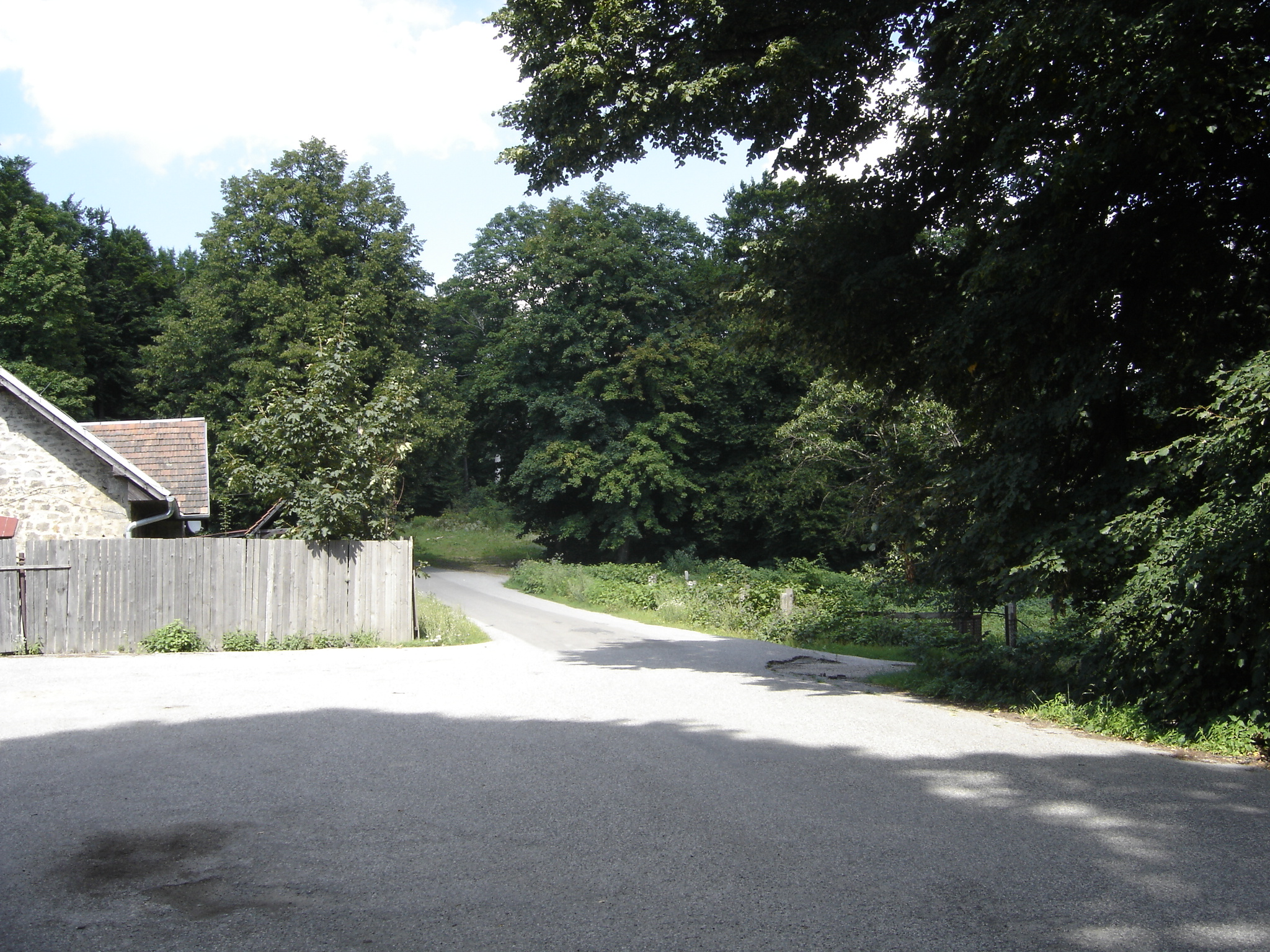
Biely kríž - turning right for direction to the site of the disaster
