= Olanchito =

- Municipality
- Location in Honduras
- Coordinates: 15°29′N 86°35′W
- Country: Honduras
- Department: Yoro

Government
  - Type: Democratic Municipality
  - Mayor: José Tomás Ponce Posas (Libre)

Area
  - Municipality: 2,019 km^{2} (780 sq mi)

Population (2023 projection)
  - Municipality: 124,286
  - Density: 61.56/km^{2} (159.4/sq mi)
  - Urban: 74,371
- Time zone: UTC-6 (Central America)
- Climate: Aw

Olanchito is a municipality in the department of Yoro, Honduras, and a town with a population of 49,750 as of 2023. The municipality was founded in 1530 and comprises 70 villages, approximately 300 hamlets, and a population of 124,286. It is located 107 miles (172 km) northeast of Tegucigalpa, the country's capital. Olanchito operates in the Central Time Zone, with a UTC offset of -6 hours. The city is the birthplace of many popular figures of Honduran literature such as Ramón Amaya Amador, whose manuscripts, collection of books, writing table, and ashes are located in Olanchito. Known locally as the Civic City, Olanchito's main industry is agriculture.

== History ==
The conquest of Honduras began with the arrival of several expeditions sent by Hernán Cortés to extend the domain of Spain in Central America. In 1525, he seized the town of Trujillo, which would later become an important Atlantic port and the first capital of Honduras. Trujillo served as an outpost for the colonization of the hostile territory of Olancho Valley. Hernando de Saavedra, Governor of Honduras, had a dispute with his counterpart in Nicaragua Pedro Arias Dávila over the rich gold deposits and rivers of Olancho. After several battles between rival Spanish groups for control of the area, the town of San Jorge de Olancho was established. The Olancho natives were mistreated, and unexpectedly rebelled and attacked the Spaniards; and Captain Juan de Grijalva, one of the conquerors of the Aztec empire, was killed in the rebellion. In 1526, the survivors scattered; some went to the town of Caceres, and others to the Valley of Aguan.

With the death of Diego de Salcedo, Governor of Honduras, in 1530, the province was in chaos, and the issue of extending the settlement and continuing the conquest of unsubjugated people continued. Accounts differ as to who founded the Olanchito settlement but according to the statistical yearbook of Antonio Vallejo, the town was founded by Captain Diego de Alvarado in 1530, with the name of San Jorge de Olancho. According to Guatemalan historian José Mata Gavidia: "With these and other graces came to Guatemala D. Pedro de Alvarado, for the year April 30. bringing people of Mexico, and some that found here in Nicaragua, Diego de Alvarado sent brother Jorge to find the city, called Olanchito, in the province of Honduras".

The town of San Jorge de Olanchito was founded in 1530 on the right bank of the Aguán river. Its first inhabitants were the few survivors of San Jorge de Olancho and others sent by Pedro de Alvarado, and it became a stage on El Camino Real (The Royal Road), which led from Truxillo to Olancho. In 1540, Governor Francisco de Montejo was ordered to continue the colonization of Olancho. He sent his officer Alonzo Caceres, who established a settlement named San Jorge de Olancho (Viejo). Alonso de Reinoso then founded the village of Nuevo Salamanca, which was rapidly depopulated due to continuing native attacks. Olancho was flourishing as a mining town, and produced huge amounts of gold and silver that were shipped from the ports of Truxillo and Puerto Caballos.

San Jorge de Olancho later became known as El Boqueron, and was completely destroyed in 1611. Historians attribute its destruction to a volcanic eruption or an earthquake; and some legends attribute it to divine causes, akin to the Biblical Sodom and Gomorrah. The survivors of this catastrophe migrated in several directions as their ancestors had done a century earlier. Some founded the city of Juticalpa, and others went to San Jorge de Olanchito and Truxillo.

Over time, people moved to the left bank of the Aguán river and established a place they called San Jorge de Olancho (Nuevo) on the route leading to the native village of Agalteca. Because all of the town's residents moved to the new settlement, it was named San Jorge de Olanchito and the old site became known as the old city, or San Juan El Sevillano.

The exact date the present city of Olanchito was founded is unknown, though it may have been sometime between 1613 and 1620. As settlers colonized the upper valley and the road leading to Yoro, the following sites were established: Santa Barbara in 1657 by Captain Pedro de Aliendo, and Subiñas and Santa Cruz in 1682 by Don José de la Cruz.

A report presented to the King of Spain by engineer Luis Diez Navarro (1742–1745) said: "The capital is that city of Comayagua, and has four cities named Gracias a Dios Department Gracias a Dios, that is the West, San Pedro Sula at northeast, San Jorge Olanchito at Levante [east] ... Forward the Partido of San Jorge Olanchito is Sonaguera, and the Port of Truxillo twenty leagues distant"

According to another document concerning the invasion of the English: "In 1747, the British themselves with Miskito people Miskito natives came to Sonaguera village, where they committed great crimes and would have done more damage but for the energetic attitude of Governor Tablada. So says the latter and adds that those foreigners who spared no means to intimidate Olanchito and Olancho El Viejo."

In 1797, there was still a war between Spain and England with the following being reported: "In part this Captaincy General directed by the Lord Mayor Governor of the Province of Comayagua, Ramon Anguiano, from Olanchito early this month have reported the following: On April 26, before five in the afternoon, the British placed, two warships and a brigantine at Truxillo Port given these and other provisions they went to the place known as La Ofrecedora, which contributed effectively to the back the Governor Intendant, as expressed through a cordon of Olanchito troops who had settled in around Sona Guera".

Due to this situation, in the late 18th century, the archive and treasury of Real Hacienda de Truxillo were moved to the town of Olanchito, where it is still located to this date.

== Demographics ==
According to the 2013 Honduras census, Olanchito municipality had a population of 104,609. The racial demographics were the following: 93.81% Mestizo, 3.26% White, 2.29% Indigenous (1.56% Tolupan), 0.60% Black or Afro-Honduran, and 0.04% others.

== Economic development ==
As of July 2017, Olanchito is the most important city in the department of Yoro due to its growing achievements in education, industry, livestock, and agriculture. The city's economic development was influenced by the presence of the Standard Fruit Company, an American company that based itself in the Aguan Valley in 1899, and played a significant role in the government of Honduras and in local development issues. Its practices are now Global G.A.P certified.

== Sports ==
The local football club Social Sol plays in the Honduran second division, and plays home games at Estadio San Jorge.

== Notable people ==
- Ramón Amaya Amador, a famous novelist, was born here.
- Placido Betancourt, mayor in 1899.
- José Roberto Figueroa, who played for Honduras at the 1982 World Cup.
