= Ramón Amaya Amador =

Honduran author (1916–1966)

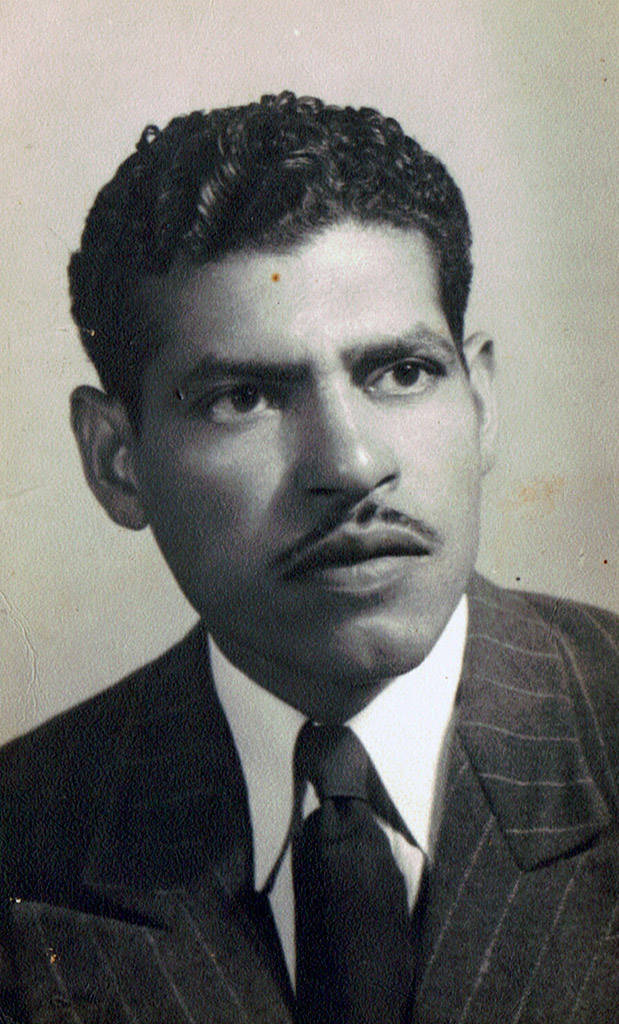
- Amaya in 1946
- Born: Ramón Amaya Amador; April 29, 1916; Olanchito, Yoro, Honduras
- Died: November 24, 1966 (aged 50); Bratislava, Czechoslovakia
- Citizenship: Honduras
- Occupations: Journalist; Author; Political activist
- Children: Aixa Ixchel; Carlos Raúl
- Parent(s): Guillermo Amador; Isabel Amaya

Ramón Amaya Amador (April 29, 1916 – November 24, 1966) was a Honduran journalist, author, and political activist, known for his most recognizable works "Prisión verde" and "Cipotes".

== Biography ==
Amaya was born in Olanchito in the department of Yoro. After being educated in La Ceiba, he worked on the banana plantations along the Northern Caribbean coast of Honduras. He published his first work in 1939. He became a journalist in 1941 for El Atlántico (The Atlantic), a La Ceiba newspaper. In October 1943 he founded a weekly magazine in Olanchito called Alerta (Alert).

A leading Honduran communist, he moved to Guatemala in 1944 fleeing political persecution, where he worked on the Nuestro Diario (Our Daily) newspaper and was very supportive of the left-wing government of Jacobo Árbenz. In his 10 years in Guatemala he also worked for the Diario de Centro América (Central American Daily), El Popular Progresista (The Popular Progressive) and Medioía (Midday). It was at the beginning of this period that he wrote what is considered his finest novel, Prisión verde (Green prison), which for many years was banned in Honduras, and described life on the banana plantations in the Bajo Aguán valley of northern Honduras, and the consequences of a labor strike there.

When the Árbenz government fell in June 1954, Amador sought refuge in the Argentine embassy before being granted asylum in Argentina where he worked for Sarmiento, a popular educational newspaper. While there, he married an Argentinian, Regina Arminda Funes, with whom he returned to Honduras in May 1957. He began working for El Cronista (The Chronicle), and founded the magazine Vistazo (View) in Tegucigalpa. Soon afterwards, he left Honduras with his family and his two small children to move to Prague, Czechoslovakia where he worked on a magazine called Problems of Peace and Socialism until he died at 50 years of age in a plane crash in 1966 in Bratislava, Czechoslovakia (today Slovakia). In September 1977 his remains were returned to the Honduran capital Tegucigalpa.

== Published books ==
His son Carlos Amaya Fúnez has worked over many years to promote the work of his father. The dates given indicate when the books were written, not when they were first published. These books have all been published in Spanish though there are almost twenty others which remain unpublished.

- Prisión Verde (1945)
- Amanecer (1947)
- El indio Sánchez (1948)
- Bajo el signo de la Paz (1952)
- Constructores (1958)
- El señor de la sierra (1957)
- Los brujos de Ilamatepeque (1958)
- Biografía de un machete (1959)
- Destacamento Rojo (1960)
- El camino de mayo (1963so
- Cipotes (1963)
- Con la misma herradura (1963)
- Jacinta Peralta (1964)
- Operación gorila (1965)
- Los rebeldes de la villa de San Miguel (1966) (Volume 1 of a 5 volume series called Morazaneida)
