= Bajo Aguán =

Geographical area in Honduras

Bajo Aguán (Lower Aguán) refers to the lower part of Honduras' Aguán River Valley, in the north-eastern Colón Department and Yoro Department; the entire valley covers 200,000 hectares. The area was at one time farmed by banana companies, but was abandoned in the 1930s, after which infrastructure deteriorated and the population sharply declined, to 68,000 inhabitants in 1961.

Re-colonization of the area after 1974 resulted in a population increase, to 181,000 by 1980. The region is now again a major agricultural area, and by the early 1980s was producing "the majority of the nation's pineapple, grapefruit, and coconut, and nearly half its banana output". By 2011 though, much of the farmland was turned to oil palm plantations, including 22,000 acres (around a fifth of Bajo Aguán's agricultural land) owned by Miguel Facussé Barjum's Corporación Dinant.

Ramón Amaya Amador set his novel Prisión verde, among the concerns of life on banana plantations in the area.
